= List of minor planets: 400001–401000 =

The following is a partial list of minor planets, running from minor-planet number 400001 through 401000, inclusive. The primary data for this and other partial lists is based on JPL's "Small-Body Orbital Elements" and data available from the Minor Planet Center. Critical list information is also provided by the MPC, unless otherwise specified from Lowell Observatory. A detailed description of the table's columns and additional sources are given on the main page including a complete list of every page in this series, and a statistical break-up on the dynamical classification of minor planets.

Also see the summary list of all named bodies in numerical and alphabetical order, and the corresponding naming citations for the number range of this particular list. New namings may only be added to this list after official publication, as the preannouncement of names is condemned by the Working Group for Small Bodies Nomenclature of the International Astronomical Union.

| Near-Earth obj. | MBA (inner) | MBA (outer) | Centaur |
| Mars-crosser | MBA (middle) | Jupiter trojan | Trans-Neptunian obj. |
| Unclassified |

== 400001–400100 ==
| Designation | | | Discovery | | | Properties | | Ref |
| Permanent | Provisional | Named after | Date | Site | Discoverer(s) | Category | Diam. | Ref |
|---|---|---|---|---|---|---|---|---|
| 400001 | 2006 FW_{17} | — | March 23, 2006 | Kitt Peak | Spacewatch | · | 1.2 km | MPC · JPL |
| 400002 | 2006 GN_{20} | — | April 2, 2006 | Kitt Peak | Spacewatch | NYS | 1.2 km | MPC · JPL |
| 400003 | 2006 HG_{32} | — | April 19, 2006 | Kitt Peak | Spacewatch | V | 790 m | MPC · JPL |
| 400004 | 2006 HD_{34} | — | April 19, 2006 | Mount Lemmon | Mount Lemmon Survey | · | 1.0 km | MPC · JPL |
| 400005 | 2006 HD_{72} | — | April 25, 2006 | Kitt Peak | Spacewatch | · | 1.1 km | MPC · JPL |
| 400006 | 2006 HV_{90} | — | April 29, 2006 | Kitt Peak | Spacewatch | MAS | 720 m | MPC · JPL |
| 400007 | 2006 HP_{91} | — | April 29, 2006 | Kitt Peak | Spacewatch | V | 800 m | MPC · JPL |
| 400008 | 2006 HL_{103} | — | April 30, 2006 | Kitt Peak | Spacewatch | · | 2.0 km | MPC · JPL |
| 400009 | 2006 JC_{28} | — | May 3, 2006 | Kitt Peak | Spacewatch | · | 1.3 km | MPC · JPL |
| 400010 | 2006 JC_{29} | — | May 3, 2006 | Kitt Peak | Spacewatch | · | 1.3 km | MPC · JPL |
| 400011 | 2006 JF_{81} | — | May 6, 2006 | Mount Lemmon | Mount Lemmon Survey | NYS | 1.2 km | MPC · JPL |
| 400012 | 2006 KH_{11} | — | May 19, 2006 | Mount Lemmon | Mount Lemmon Survey | H | 620 m | MPC · JPL |
| 400013 | 2006 KE_{24} | — | May 19, 2006 | Mount Lemmon | Mount Lemmon Survey | 3:2 · SHU | 5.3 km | MPC · JPL |
| 400014 | 2006 KD_{108} | — | April 19, 2006 | Mount Lemmon | Mount Lemmon Survey | · | 1.3 km | MPC · JPL |
| 400015 | 2006 KH_{126} | — | May 25, 2006 | Mauna Kea | P. A. Wiegert | · | 990 m | MPC · JPL |
| 400016 | 2006 MG_{13} | — | June 25, 2006 | Eskridge | Farpoint | · | 1.7 km | MPC · JPL |
| 400017 | 2006 OX_{10} | — | July 26, 2006 | Hibiscus | S. F. Hönig | (5) | 950 m | MPC · JPL |
| 400018 | 2006 OG_{14} | — | July 27, 2006 | Hibiscus | S. F. Hönig | · | 1.2 km | MPC · JPL |
| 400019 | 2006 OT_{14} | — | July 25, 2006 | Palomar | NEAT | · | 1.2 km | MPC · JPL |
| 400020 | 2006 OA_{22} | — | July 21, 2006 | Mount Lemmon | Mount Lemmon Survey | · | 2.0 km | MPC · JPL |
| 400021 | 2006 PZ_{10} | — | August 13, 2006 | Palomar | NEAT | T_{j} (2.99) · 3:2 · SHU | 4.8 km | MPC · JPL |
| 400022 | 2006 PE_{32} | — | August 15, 2006 | Palomar | NEAT | · | 1.9 km | MPC · JPL |
| 400023 | 2006 PE_{33} | — | August 13, 2006 | Siding Spring | SSS | · | 2.7 km | MPC · JPL |
| 400024 | 2006 PL_{37} | — | August 13, 2006 | Palomar | NEAT | JUN | 1.1 km | MPC · JPL |
| 400025 | 2006 QK_{2} | — | August 17, 2006 | Palomar | NEAT | 3:2 · SHU | 6.2 km | MPC · JPL |
| 400026 | 2006 QR_{42} | — | August 17, 2006 | Palomar | NEAT | · | 1.0 km | MPC · JPL |
| 400027 | 2006 QA_{48} | — | August 21, 2006 | Kitt Peak | Spacewatch | · | 1.1 km | MPC · JPL |
| 400028 | 2006 QF_{83} | — | August 27, 2006 | Kitt Peak | Spacewatch | (5) | 790 m | MPC · JPL |
| 400029 | 2006 QF_{92} | — | August 16, 2006 | Palomar | NEAT | · | 1.7 km | MPC · JPL |
| 400030 | 2006 QJ_{96} | — | August 16, 2006 | Palomar | NEAT | (194) | 1.2 km | MPC · JPL |
| 400031 | 2006 QX_{105} | — | August 28, 2006 | Catalina | CSS | (5) | 1.0 km | MPC · JPL |
| 400032 | 2006 QU_{107} | — | August 28, 2006 | Catalina | CSS | EUN | 1.1 km | MPC · JPL |
| 400033 | 2006 QT_{108} | — | August 28, 2006 | Goodricke-Pigott | R. A. Tucker | · | 2.0 km | MPC · JPL |
| 400034 | 2006 QZ_{116} | — | August 27, 2006 | Anderson Mesa | LONEOS | (5) | 1.3 km | MPC · JPL |
| 400035 | 2006 QF_{119} | — | August 28, 2006 | Socorro | LINEAR | · | 3.0 km | MPC · JPL |
| 400036 | 2006 QY_{121} | — | August 29, 2006 | Catalina | CSS | · | 1.7 km | MPC · JPL |
| 400037 | 2006 QA_{135} | — | August 27, 2006 | Anderson Mesa | LONEOS | (5) | 1.1 km | MPC · JPL |
| 400038 | 2006 QM_{155} | — | August 18, 2006 | Kitt Peak | Spacewatch | · | 2.2 km | MPC · JPL |
| 400039 | 2006 QS_{164} | — | August 29, 2006 | Anderson Mesa | LONEOS | · | 930 m | MPC · JPL |
| 400040 | 2006 QK_{167} | — | August 30, 2006 | Anderson Mesa | LONEOS | · | 1.0 km | MPC · JPL |
| 400041 | 2006 QW_{186} | — | August 18, 2006 | Kitt Peak | Spacewatch | · | 1.3 km | MPC · JPL |
| 400042 | 2006 RX_{20} | — | September 15, 2006 | Kitt Peak | Spacewatch | · | 1.2 km | MPC · JPL |
| 400043 | 2006 RK_{57} | — | September 15, 2006 | Kitt Peak | Spacewatch | · | 1.2 km | MPC · JPL |
| 400044 | 2006 RH_{82} | — | September 15, 2006 | Kitt Peak | Spacewatch | · | 1.2 km | MPC · JPL |
| 400045 | 2006 RA_{83} | — | September 15, 2006 | Kitt Peak | Spacewatch | · | 1.4 km | MPC · JPL |
| 400046 | 2006 RC_{100} | — | September 14, 2006 | Catalina | CSS | · | 1.3 km | MPC · JPL |
| 400047 | 2006 RT_{100} | — | September 14, 2006 | Catalina | CSS | EUN | 1.1 km | MPC · JPL |
| 400048 | 2006 RX_{107} | — | September 14, 2006 | Mauna Kea | Masiero, J. | · | 1.3 km | MPC · JPL |
| 400049 | 2006 RG_{120} | — | September 12, 2006 | Mayhill | Lowe, A. | · | 1.6 km | MPC · JPL |
| 400050 | 2006 SR_{26} | — | September 16, 2006 | Anderson Mesa | LONEOS | · | 1.3 km | MPC · JPL |
| 400051 | 2006 ST_{38} | — | September 18, 2006 | Kitt Peak | Spacewatch | · | 930 m | MPC · JPL |
| 400052 | 2006 SQ_{42} | — | September 18, 2006 | Anderson Mesa | LONEOS | · | 2.1 km | MPC · JPL |
| 400053 | 2006 SV_{53} | — | September 16, 2006 | Catalina | CSS | · | 1.7 km | MPC · JPL |
| 400054 | 2006 SK_{55} | — | September 18, 2006 | Catalina | CSS | · | 1.3 km | MPC · JPL |
| 400055 | 2006 SC_{59} | — | September 16, 2006 | Catalina | CSS | ADE | 1.6 km | MPC · JPL |
| 400056 | 2006 SV_{61} | — | September 18, 2006 | Catalina | CSS | (5) | 1.0 km | MPC · JPL |
| 400057 | 2006 SM_{71} | — | July 21, 2006 | Mount Lemmon | Mount Lemmon Survey | · | 1.7 km | MPC · JPL |
| 400058 | 2006 SK_{76} | — | September 19, 2006 | Kitt Peak | Spacewatch | · | 1.4 km | MPC · JPL |
| 400059 | 2006 SA_{95} | — | September 18, 2006 | Kitt Peak | Spacewatch | · | 2.0 km | MPC · JPL |
| 400060 | 2006 SO_{95} | — | September 18, 2006 | Kitt Peak | Spacewatch | · | 1.1 km | MPC · JPL |
| 400061 | 2006 SK_{97} | — | September 18, 2006 | Kitt Peak | Spacewatch | · | 1.7 km | MPC · JPL |
| 400062 | 2006 SY_{97} | — | September 18, 2006 | Kitt Peak | Spacewatch | · | 1.5 km | MPC · JPL |
| 400063 | 2006 SO_{98} | — | September 18, 2006 | Kitt Peak | Spacewatch | HOF | 2.2 km | MPC · JPL |
| 400064 | 2006 SD_{105} | — | September 19, 2006 | Catalina | CSS | · | 2.8 km | MPC · JPL |
| 400065 | 2006 SR_{116} | — | September 24, 2006 | Kitt Peak | Spacewatch | · | 1.4 km | MPC · JPL |
| 400066 | 2006 SF_{127} | — | September 24, 2006 | Anderson Mesa | LONEOS | · | 3.3 km | MPC · JPL |
| 400067 | 2006 SU_{127} | — | September 17, 2006 | Catalina | CSS | MAR | 1.2 km | MPC · JPL |
| 400068 | 2006 SV_{130} | — | September 23, 2006 | Kitami | K. Endate | (5) | 1.1 km | MPC · JPL |
| 400069 | 2006 SC_{152} | — | September 19, 2006 | Kitt Peak | Spacewatch | · | 1.6 km | MPC · JPL |
| 400070 | 2006 SK_{159} | — | September 23, 2006 | Kitt Peak | Spacewatch | · | 1.1 km | MPC · JPL |
| 400071 | 2006 SW_{167} | — | September 25, 2006 | Kitt Peak | Spacewatch | · | 2.7 km | MPC · JPL |
| 400072 Radviliškis | 2006 SQ_{197} | Radviliškis | September 25, 2006 | Moletai | K. Černis, J. Zdanavičius | · | 1.2 km | MPC · JPL |
| 400073 | 2006 SC_{205} | — | September 19, 2006 | Kitt Peak | Spacewatch | · | 1.2 km | MPC · JPL |
| 400074 | 2006 SF_{209} | — | September 26, 2006 | Socorro | LINEAR | · | 2.6 km | MPC · JPL |
| 400075 | 2006 SD_{228} | — | September 18, 2006 | Kitt Peak | Spacewatch | · | 1.5 km | MPC · JPL |
| 400076 | 2006 SQ_{232} | — | September 26, 2006 | Kitt Peak | Spacewatch | · | 1.6 km | MPC · JPL |
| 400077 | 2006 SY_{238} | — | August 28, 2006 | Kitt Peak | Spacewatch | · | 1.1 km | MPC · JPL |
| 400078 | 2006 SU_{266} | — | September 26, 2006 | Kitt Peak | Spacewatch | · | 2.7 km | MPC · JPL |
| 400079 | 2006 SV_{287} | — | September 25, 2006 | Catalina | CSS | HNS | 1.6 km | MPC · JPL |
| 400080 | 2006 SC_{292} | — | September 27, 2006 | Catalina | CSS | · | 2.9 km | MPC · JPL |
| 400081 | 2006 SS_{301} | — | September 26, 2006 | Catalina | CSS | · | 1.4 km | MPC · JPL |
| 400082 | 2006 SC_{311} | — | September 27, 2006 | Kitt Peak | Spacewatch | · | 1.3 km | MPC · JPL |
| 400083 | 2006 ST_{333} | — | September 28, 2006 | Kitt Peak | Spacewatch | · | 1.6 km | MPC · JPL |
| 400084 | 2006 SJ_{343} | — | September 28, 2006 | Kitt Peak | Spacewatch | · | 2.1 km | MPC · JPL |
| 400085 | 2006 SZ_{345} | — | September 28, 2006 | Kitt Peak | Spacewatch | (5) | 1.3 km | MPC · JPL |
| 400086 | 2006 SA_{352} | — | September 30, 2006 | Catalina | CSS | · | 1.7 km | MPC · JPL |
| 400087 | 2006 SG_{354} | — | September 30, 2006 | Catalina | CSS | · | 1.2 km | MPC · JPL |
| 400088 | 2006 SB_{368} | — | September 28, 2006 | Farra d'Isonzo | Farra d'Isonzo | H | 470 m | MPC · JPL |
| 400089 | 2006 SH_{385} | — | September 29, 2006 | Apache Point | A. C. Becker | · | 2.7 km | MPC · JPL |
| 400090 | 2006 SV_{389} | — | September 30, 2006 | Apache Point | A. C. Becker | · | 2.1 km | MPC · JPL |
| 400091 | 2006 SQ_{390} | — | September 30, 2006 | Apache Point | A. C. Becker | · | 2.0 km | MPC · JPL |
| 400092 | 2006 SQ_{400} | — | September 25, 2006 | Kitt Peak | Spacewatch | HOF | 2.3 km | MPC · JPL |
| 400093 | 2006 SF_{406} | — | September 19, 2006 | Kitt Peak | Spacewatch | · | 1.6 km | MPC · JPL |
| 400094 | 2006 SN_{407} | — | September 26, 2006 | Mount Lemmon | Mount Lemmon Survey | · | 1.1 km | MPC · JPL |
| 400095 | 2006 SJ_{413} | — | September 25, 2006 | Catalina | CSS | · | 2.4 km | MPC · JPL |
| 400096 | 2006 TX_{13} | — | October 10, 2006 | Palomar | NEAT | EUN | 1.3 km | MPC · JPL |
| 400097 | 2006 TF_{14} | — | October 10, 2006 | Palomar | NEAT | · | 1.2 km | MPC · JPL |
| 400098 | 2006 TK_{14} | — | October 10, 2006 | Palomar | NEAT | (5) | 1.2 km | MPC · JPL |
| 400099 | 2006 TS_{24} | — | October 12, 2006 | Kitt Peak | Spacewatch | · | 1.1 km | MPC · JPL |
| 400100 | 2006 TC_{28} | — | October 12, 2006 | Kitt Peak | Spacewatch | · | 1.6 km | MPC · JPL |

== 400101–400200 ==
back to top

| Designation | | | Discovery | | | Properties | | Ref |
| Permanent | Provisional | Named after | Date | Site | Discoverer(s) | Category | Diam. | Ref |
|---|---|---|---|---|---|---|---|---|
| 400101 | 2006 TO_{43} | — | October 12, 2006 | Kitt Peak | Spacewatch | · | 1.5 km | MPC · JPL |
| 400102 | 2006 TS_{53} | — | October 12, 2006 | Kitt Peak | Spacewatch | · | 1.4 km | MPC · JPL |
| 400103 | 2006 TQ_{58} | — | June 3, 2006 | Catalina | CSS | · | 1.6 km | MPC · JPL |
| 400104 | 2006 TF_{65} | — | October 11, 2006 | Palomar | NEAT | · | 1.7 km | MPC · JPL |
| 400105 | 2006 TF_{75} | — | October 11, 2006 | Palomar | NEAT | · | 1.6 km | MPC · JPL |
| 400106 | 2006 TJ_{84} | — | October 13, 2006 | Kitt Peak | Spacewatch | · | 1.7 km | MPC · JPL |
| 400107 | 2006 TO_{85} | — | October 13, 2006 | Kitt Peak | Spacewatch | · | 1.2 km | MPC · JPL |
| 400108 | 2006 TN_{122} | — | October 11, 2006 | Palomar | NEAT | ADE | 2.0 km | MPC · JPL |
| 400109 | 2006 TS_{123} | — | October 2, 2006 | Mount Lemmon | Mount Lemmon Survey | · | 1.3 km | MPC · JPL |
| 400110 | 2006 TC_{125} | — | October 4, 2006 | Mount Lemmon | Mount Lemmon Survey | (5) | 1.5 km | MPC · JPL |
| 400111 | 2006 TB_{129} | — | October 3, 2006 | Mount Lemmon | Mount Lemmon Survey | (5) | 1.2 km | MPC · JPL |
| 400112 | 2006 UF_{8} | — | October 16, 2006 | Catalina | CSS | · | 1.9 km | MPC · JPL |
| 400113 | 2006 UF_{16} | — | October 17, 2006 | Mount Lemmon | Mount Lemmon Survey | · | 2.2 km | MPC · JPL |
| 400114 | 2006 UQ_{20} | — | October 16, 2006 | Kitt Peak | Spacewatch | · | 1.2 km | MPC · JPL |
| 400115 | 2006 UV_{21} | — | October 16, 2006 | Kitt Peak | Spacewatch | · | 1.1 km | MPC · JPL |
| 400116 | 2006 UH_{24} | — | October 16, 2006 | Kitt Peak | Spacewatch | · | 1.2 km | MPC · JPL |
| 400117 | 2006 UN_{30} | — | September 25, 2006 | Kitt Peak | Spacewatch | · | 1.7 km | MPC · JPL |
| 400118 | 2006 UU_{30} | — | October 16, 2006 | Kitt Peak | Spacewatch | · | 1.4 km | MPC · JPL |
| 400119 | 2006 UM_{32} | — | October 16, 2006 | Kitt Peak | Spacewatch | (5) | 1.2 km | MPC · JPL |
| 400120 | 2006 UZ_{51} | — | October 17, 2006 | Kitt Peak | Spacewatch | · | 1.5 km | MPC · JPL |
| 400121 | 2006 UE_{58} | — | October 18, 2006 | Kitt Peak | Spacewatch | ADE | 2.1 km | MPC · JPL |
| 400122 | 2006 UG_{84} | — | October 17, 2006 | Mount Lemmon | Mount Lemmon Survey | · | 1.5 km | MPC · JPL |
| 400123 | 2006 UL_{88} | — | October 17, 2006 | Kitt Peak | Spacewatch | · | 1.5 km | MPC · JPL |
| 400124 | 2006 UM_{88} | — | October 17, 2006 | Kitt Peak | Spacewatch | · | 1.9 km | MPC · JPL |
| 400125 | 2006 UY_{100} | — | October 3, 2006 | Mount Lemmon | Mount Lemmon Survey | · | 2.1 km | MPC · JPL |
| 400126 | 2006 UP_{105} | — | October 3, 2006 | Mount Lemmon | Mount Lemmon Survey | · | 1.9 km | MPC · JPL |
| 400127 | 2006 UO_{106} | — | October 18, 2006 | Kitt Peak | Spacewatch | · | 1.4 km | MPC · JPL |
| 400128 | 2006 UG_{126} | — | October 19, 2006 | Kitt Peak | Spacewatch | · | 1.5 km | MPC · JPL |
| 400129 | 2006 UK_{128} | — | October 19, 2006 | Kitt Peak | Spacewatch | · | 2.0 km | MPC · JPL |
| 400130 | 2006 US_{128} | — | October 2, 2006 | Mount Lemmon | Mount Lemmon Survey | EUN | 1.3 km | MPC · JPL |
| 400131 | 2006 UY_{128} | — | October 19, 2006 | Kitt Peak | Spacewatch | · | 1.8 km | MPC · JPL |
| 400132 | 2006 UH_{152} | — | October 20, 2006 | Kitt Peak | Spacewatch | · | 1.8 km | MPC · JPL |
| 400133 | 2006 UU_{170} | — | October 21, 2006 | Mount Lemmon | Mount Lemmon Survey | · | 1.8 km | MPC · JPL |
| 400134 | 2006 UM_{177} | — | October 16, 2006 | Catalina | CSS | · | 2.2 km | MPC · JPL |
| 400135 | 2006 UB_{178} | — | October 16, 2006 | Catalina | CSS | (5) | 1.4 km | MPC · JPL |
| 400136 | 2006 UE_{188} | — | October 19, 2006 | Catalina | CSS | EUN | 1.2 km | MPC · JPL |
| 400137 | 2006 UN_{189} | — | October 19, 2006 | Catalina | CSS | EUN | 1.5 km | MPC · JPL |
| 400138 | 2006 UX_{189} | — | October 19, 2006 | Catalina | CSS | · | 1.7 km | MPC · JPL |
| 400139 | 2006 UM_{192} | — | October 19, 2006 | Catalina | CSS | · | 1.9 km | MPC · JPL |
| 400140 | 2006 UU_{201} | — | October 21, 2006 | Mount Lemmon | Mount Lemmon Survey | · | 3.3 km | MPC · JPL |
| 400141 | 2006 UA_{215} | — | October 25, 2006 | Kuma Kogen | Fujita, Y. | H | 670 m | MPC · JPL |
| 400142 | 2006 UT_{224} | — | October 19, 2006 | Mount Lemmon | Mount Lemmon Survey | EUN | 1.3 km | MPC · JPL |
| 400143 | 2006 UC_{227} | — | October 20, 2006 | Palomar | NEAT | EUN | 1.2 km | MPC · JPL |
| 400144 | 2006 UE_{232} | — | October 21, 2006 | Mount Lemmon | Mount Lemmon Survey | · | 1.2 km | MPC · JPL |
| 400145 | 2006 UJ_{244} | — | October 27, 2006 | Mount Lemmon | Mount Lemmon Survey | · | 1.4 km | MPC · JPL |
| 400146 | 2006 UZ_{251} | — | October 27, 2006 | Mount Lemmon | Mount Lemmon Survey | · | 1.5 km | MPC · JPL |
| 400147 | 2006 UV_{280} | — | October 20, 2006 | Kitt Peak | Spacewatch | · | 1.5 km | MPC · JPL |
| 400148 | 2006 UT_{288} | — | October 30, 2006 | Catalina | CSS | · | 1.6 km | MPC · JPL |
| 400149 | 2006 UW_{329} | — | October 31, 2006 | Mount Lemmon | Mount Lemmon Survey | · | 1.5 km | MPC · JPL |
| 400150 | 2006 UM_{335} | — | October 17, 2006 | Catalina | CSS | JUN | 1.5 km | MPC · JPL |
| 400151 | 2006 UB_{346} | — | October 17, 2006 | Mount Lemmon | Mount Lemmon Survey | · | 2.0 km | MPC · JPL |
| 400152 | 2006 VO_{12} | — | November 11, 2006 | Socorro | LINEAR | · | 1.5 km | MPC · JPL |
| 400153 | 2006 VP_{12} | — | November 11, 2006 | Socorro | LINEAR | · | 1.9 km | MPC · JPL |
| 400154 | 2006 VP_{23} | — | November 10, 2006 | Kitt Peak | Spacewatch | · | 1.5 km | MPC · JPL |
| 400155 | 2006 VZ_{30} | — | October 20, 2006 | Mount Lemmon | Mount Lemmon Survey | · | 1.5 km | MPC · JPL |
| 400156 | 2006 VH_{47} | — | November 9, 2006 | Kitt Peak | Spacewatch | · | 1.5 km | MPC · JPL |
| 400157 | 2006 VV_{66} | — | November 11, 2006 | Catalina | CSS | · | 1.3 km | MPC · JPL |
| 400158 | 2006 VR_{69} | — | October 31, 2006 | Mount Lemmon | Mount Lemmon Survey | · | 1.3 km | MPC · JPL |
| 400159 | 2006 VX_{74} | — | November 11, 2006 | Mount Lemmon | Mount Lemmon Survey | · | 2.5 km | MPC · JPL |
| 400160 | 2006 VH_{81} | — | November 12, 2006 | Mount Lemmon | Mount Lemmon Survey | · | 4.3 km | MPC · JPL |
| 400161 | 2006 VY_{84} | — | November 13, 2006 | Kitt Peak | Spacewatch | (5) | 1.4 km | MPC · JPL |
| 400162 SAIT | 2006 VM_{85} | SAIT | November 14, 2006 | San Marcello | A. Boattini, M. Mazzucato | · | 2.0 km | MPC · JPL |
| 400163 | 2006 VB_{111} | — | November 13, 2006 | Kitt Peak | Spacewatch | · | 1.8 km | MPC · JPL |
| 400164 | 2006 VG_{111} | — | November 13, 2006 | Kitt Peak | Spacewatch | · | 1.4 km | MPC · JPL |
| 400165 | 2006 VL_{112} | — | November 13, 2006 | Palomar | NEAT | JUN | 1.2 km | MPC · JPL |
| 400166 | 2006 VX_{133} | — | November 15, 2006 | Mount Lemmon | Mount Lemmon Survey | · | 1.9 km | MPC · JPL |
| 400167 | 2006 VS_{134} | — | November 15, 2006 | Catalina | CSS | · | 1.5 km | MPC · JPL |
| 400168 | 2006 VO_{143} | — | August 27, 2006 | Kitt Peak | Spacewatch | · | 1.9 km | MPC · JPL |
| 400169 | 2006 VS_{154} | — | October 16, 2006 | Catalina | CSS | · | 1.7 km | MPC · JPL |
| 400170 | 2006 WZ_{16} | — | November 17, 2006 | Kitt Peak | Spacewatch | · | 1.7 km | MPC · JPL |
| 400171 | 2006 WY_{18} | — | September 19, 2006 | Catalina | CSS | · | 2.6 km | MPC · JPL |
| 400172 | 2006 WZ_{18} | — | November 17, 2006 | Kitt Peak | Spacewatch | (5) | 1.3 km | MPC · JPL |
| 400173 | 2006 WJ_{22} | — | November 17, 2006 | Mount Lemmon | Mount Lemmon Survey | AGN | 1.2 km | MPC · JPL |
| 400174 | 2006 WW_{25} | — | November 17, 2006 | Mount Lemmon | Mount Lemmon Survey | ADE | 2.7 km | MPC · JPL |
| 400175 | 2006 WC_{45} | — | November 16, 2006 | Mount Lemmon | Mount Lemmon Survey | · | 1.8 km | MPC · JPL |
| 400176 | 2006 WH_{81} | — | November 18, 2006 | Mount Lemmon | Mount Lemmon Survey | (5) | 1.2 km | MPC · JPL |
| 400177 | 2006 WV_{94} | — | November 19, 2006 | Kitt Peak | Spacewatch | · | 1.9 km | MPC · JPL |
| 400178 | 2006 WP_{102} | — | November 19, 2006 | Kitt Peak | Spacewatch | KOR | 1.2 km | MPC · JPL |
| 400179 | 2006 WO_{115} | — | November 20, 2006 | Socorro | LINEAR | · | 1.5 km | MPC · JPL |
| 400180 | 2006 WT_{118} | — | October 15, 2006 | Kitt Peak | Spacewatch | · | 1.5 km | MPC · JPL |
| 400181 | 2006 WH_{119} | — | November 21, 2006 | Mount Lemmon | Mount Lemmon Survey | · | 1.5 km | MPC · JPL |
| 400182 | 2006 WO_{120} | — | November 21, 2006 | Socorro | LINEAR | · | 2.4 km | MPC · JPL |
| 400183 | 2006 WB_{122} | — | November 21, 2006 | Mount Lemmon | Mount Lemmon Survey | · | 1.4 km | MPC · JPL |
| 400184 | 2006 WZ_{133} | — | November 18, 2006 | Mount Lemmon | Mount Lemmon Survey | · | 1.8 km | MPC · JPL |
| 400185 | 2006 WC_{139} | — | November 19, 2006 | Kitt Peak | Spacewatch | · | 1.5 km | MPC · JPL |
| 400186 | 2006 WU_{146} | — | November 20, 2006 | Kitt Peak | Spacewatch | · | 2.2 km | MPC · JPL |
| 400187 | 2006 WK_{187} | — | November 23, 2006 | Mount Lemmon | Mount Lemmon Survey | · | 1.7 km | MPC · JPL |
| 400188 | 2006 WG_{200} | — | November 19, 2006 | Kitt Peak | Spacewatch | · | 2.4 km | MPC · JPL |
| 400189 | 2006 WJ_{205} | — | October 28, 2006 | Mount Lemmon | Mount Lemmon Survey | · | 2.1 km | MPC · JPL |
| 400190 | 2006 XL_{19} | — | December 11, 2006 | Kitt Peak | Spacewatch | · | 3.9 km | MPC · JPL |
| 400191 | 2006 XL_{20} | — | October 23, 2006 | Mount Lemmon | Mount Lemmon Survey | · | 2.3 km | MPC · JPL |
| 400192 | 2006 XS_{46} | — | December 13, 2006 | Catalina | CSS | · | 3.1 km | MPC · JPL |
| 400193 Castión | 2006 XW_{60} | Castión | December 14, 2006 | San Marcello | A. Boattini, M. Mazzucato | · | 2.6 km | MPC · JPL |
| 400194 | 2006 XQ_{66} | — | December 14, 2006 | Palomar | NEAT | · | 2.4 km | MPC · JPL |
| 400195 | 2006 YL_{8} | — | November 27, 2006 | Mount Lemmon | Mount Lemmon Survey | EOS | 2.1 km | MPC · JPL |
| 400196 | 2006 YL_{13} | — | December 16, 2006 | Catalina | CSS | · | 1.7 km | MPC · JPL |
| 400197 | 2006 YN_{24} | — | December 21, 2006 | Kitt Peak | Spacewatch | · | 3.8 km | MPC · JPL |
| 400198 | 2006 YD_{29} | — | December 21, 2006 | Mount Lemmon | Mount Lemmon Survey | EOS | 1.9 km | MPC · JPL |
| 400199 | 2006 YO_{54} | — | December 24, 2006 | Kitt Peak | Spacewatch | · | 3.4 km | MPC · JPL |
| 400200 | 2007 AG_{13} | — | January 9, 2007 | Mount Lemmon | Mount Lemmon Survey | · | 2.8 km | MPC · JPL |

== 400201–400300 ==
back to top

| Designation | | | Discovery | | | Properties | | Ref |
| Permanent | Provisional | Named after | Date | Site | Discoverer(s) | Category | Diam. | Ref |
|---|---|---|---|---|---|---|---|---|
| 400201 | 2007 AL_{13} | — | January 9, 2007 | Mount Lemmon | Mount Lemmon Survey | · | 1.9 km | MPC · JPL |
| 400202 | 2007 AT_{14} | — | October 21, 2006 | Mount Lemmon | Mount Lemmon Survey | · | 3.8 km | MPC · JPL |
| 400203 | 2007 AW_{24} | — | January 15, 2007 | Catalina | CSS | JUN | 970 m | MPC · JPL |
| 400204 | 2007 AE_{30} | — | January 10, 2007 | Mount Lemmon | Mount Lemmon Survey | · | 1.9 km | MPC · JPL |
| 400205 | 2007 BO | — | January 8, 2007 | Mount Lemmon | Mount Lemmon Survey | · | 3.5 km | MPC · JPL |
| 400206 | 2007 BT_{8} | — | January 17, 2007 | Kitt Peak | Spacewatch | · | 3.6 km | MPC · JPL |
| 400207 | 2007 BC_{16} | — | January 17, 2007 | Kitt Peak | Spacewatch | · | 1.7 km | MPC · JPL |
| 400208 | 2007 BZ_{35} | — | December 13, 2006 | Mount Lemmon | Mount Lemmon Survey | · | 3.1 km | MPC · JPL |
| 400209 | 2007 BE_{46} | — | December 25, 2006 | Kitt Peak | Spacewatch | · | 2.2 km | MPC · JPL |
| 400210 | 2007 BN_{58} | — | January 10, 2007 | Mount Lemmon | Mount Lemmon Survey | · | 4.0 km | MPC · JPL |
| 400211 | 2007 BE_{61} | — | January 27, 2007 | Mount Lemmon | Mount Lemmon Survey | · | 2.8 km | MPC · JPL |
| 400212 | 2007 BL_{69} | — | January 27, 2007 | Mount Lemmon | Mount Lemmon Survey | · | 660 m | MPC · JPL |
| 400213 | 2007 BG_{78} | — | January 24, 2007 | Mount Lemmon | Mount Lemmon Survey | · | 3.7 km | MPC · JPL |
| 400214 | 2007 BW_{78} | — | January 27, 2007 | Mount Lemmon | Mount Lemmon Survey | HYG | 3.1 km | MPC · JPL |
| 400215 | 2007 CN_{1} | — | October 29, 2005 | Mount Lemmon | Mount Lemmon Survey | THM | 2.7 km | MPC · JPL |
| 400216 | 2007 CC_{5} | — | February 6, 2007 | Kitt Peak | Spacewatch | · | 910 m | MPC · JPL |
| 400217 | 2007 CT_{20} | — | February 6, 2007 | Mount Lemmon | Mount Lemmon Survey | · | 2.7 km | MPC · JPL |
| 400218 | 2007 CE_{22} | — | February 6, 2007 | Mount Lemmon | Mount Lemmon Survey | TIR | 3.2 km | MPC · JPL |
| 400219 | 2007 CA_{55} | — | January 13, 2007 | Socorro | LINEAR | · | 4.6 km | MPC · JPL |
| 400220 | 2007 CO_{79} | — | November 16, 2006 | Mount Lemmon | Mount Lemmon Survey | EUP | 4.0 km | MPC · JPL |
| 400221 | 2007 DR_{16} | — | February 17, 2007 | Kitt Peak | Spacewatch | EOS | 2.1 km | MPC · JPL |
| 400222 | 2007 DH_{20} | — | February 17, 2007 | Kitt Peak | Spacewatch | THM | 2.1 km | MPC · JPL |
| 400223 | 2007 DE_{80} | — | February 23, 2007 | Mount Lemmon | Mount Lemmon Survey | EOS | 1.9 km | MPC · JPL |
| 400224 | 2007 DV_{92} | — | January 28, 2007 | Mount Lemmon | Mount Lemmon Survey | · | 2.9 km | MPC · JPL |
| 400225 | 2007 DP_{100} | — | February 25, 2007 | Mount Lemmon | Mount Lemmon Survey | · | 3.2 km | MPC · JPL |
| 400226 | 2007 DA_{101} | — | February 26, 2007 | Mount Lemmon | Mount Lemmon Survey | · | 3.3 km | MPC · JPL |
| 400227 | 2007 EC_{64} | — | February 6, 2007 | Mount Lemmon | Mount Lemmon Survey | · | 3.4 km | MPC · JPL |
| 400228 | 2007 ER_{110} | — | March 11, 2007 | Kitt Peak | Spacewatch | · | 740 m | MPC · JPL |
| 400229 | 2007 EY_{115} | — | March 13, 2007 | Mount Lemmon | Mount Lemmon Survey | · | 730 m | MPC · JPL |
| 400230 | 2007 EP_{153} | — | March 12, 2007 | Mount Lemmon | Mount Lemmon Survey | EOS | 2.3 km | MPC · JPL |
| 400231 | 2007 EZ_{172} | — | November 25, 2005 | Mount Lemmon | Mount Lemmon Survey | · | 660 m | MPC · JPL |
| 400232 | 2007 ET_{219} | — | March 11, 2007 | Kitt Peak | Spacewatch | · | 4.1 km | MPC · JPL |
| 400233 | 2007 FY_{15} | — | March 19, 2007 | Catalina | CSS | · | 830 m | MPC · JPL |
| 400234 | 2007 GL_{11} | — | February 22, 2001 | Kitt Peak | Spacewatch | · | 2.9 km | MPC · JPL |
| 400235 | 2007 GC_{48} | — | April 14, 2007 | Kitt Peak | Spacewatch | · | 720 m | MPC · JPL |
| 400236 | 2007 HS_{53} | — | April 22, 2007 | Kitt Peak | Spacewatch | · | 3.3 km | MPC · JPL |
| 400237 | 2007 HX_{61} | — | April 22, 2007 | Mount Lemmon | Mount Lemmon Survey | · | 690 m | MPC · JPL |
| 400238 | 2007 HS_{66} | — | April 22, 2007 | Mount Lemmon | Mount Lemmon Survey | · | 3.4 km | MPC · JPL |
| 400239 | 2007 HA_{85} | — | March 16, 2007 | Mount Lemmon | Mount Lemmon Survey | · | 720 m | MPC · JPL |
| 400240 | 2007 HX_{95} | — | April 25, 2007 | Mount Lemmon | Mount Lemmon Survey | · | 710 m | MPC · JPL |
| 400241 | 2007 JX_{44} | — | May 11, 2007 | Mount Lemmon | Mount Lemmon Survey | · | 670 m | MPC · JPL |
| 400242 | 2007 NZ_{4} | — | July 15, 2007 | Reedy Creek | J. Broughton | · | 1.0 km | MPC · JPL |
| 400243 | 2007 ON_{6} | — | July 21, 2007 | Reedy Creek | J. Broughton | · | 1.3 km | MPC · JPL |
| 400244 | 2007 PD_{11} | — | August 12, 2007 | Pla D'Arguines | R. Ferrando | V | 820 m | MPC · JPL |
| 400245 | 2007 PW_{17} | — | August 9, 2007 | Socorro | LINEAR | · | 860 m | MPC · JPL |
| 400246 | 2007 PN_{23} | — | August 12, 2007 | Socorro | LINEAR | · | 1.6 km | MPC · JPL |
| 400247 | 2007 PA_{24} | — | August 12, 2007 | Socorro | LINEAR | · | 1.0 km | MPC · JPL |
| 400248 | 2007 PW_{25} | — | August 8, 2007 | Socorro | LINEAR | · | 680 m | MPC · JPL |
| 400249 | 2007 PF_{26} | — | August 11, 2007 | Socorro | LINEAR | · | 910 m | MPC · JPL |
| 400250 | 2007 PY_{36} | — | August 13, 2007 | Socorro | LINEAR | · | 1.4 km | MPC · JPL |
| 400251 | 2007 PS_{39} | — | August 13, 2007 | Socorro | LINEAR | (2076) | 810 m | MPC · JPL |
| 400252 | 2007 PR_{49} | — | August 10, 2007 | Kitt Peak | Spacewatch | · | 1 km | MPC · JPL |
| 400253 | 2007 PT_{50} | — | August 9, 2007 | Socorro | LINEAR | · | 770 m | MPC · JPL |
| 400254 | 2007 RC | — | September 1, 2007 | Eskridge | G. Hug | · | 790 m | MPC · JPL |
| 400255 | 2007 RW_{4} | — | September 3, 2007 | Catalina | CSS | · | 1.7 km | MPC · JPL |
| 400256 | 2007 RG_{24} | — | September 3, 2007 | Catalina | CSS | · | 1.2 km | MPC · JPL |
| 400257 | 2007 RF_{26} | — | September 4, 2007 | Mount Lemmon | Mount Lemmon Survey | NYS | 860 m | MPC · JPL |
| 400258 | 2007 RG_{36} | — | September 8, 2007 | Anderson Mesa | LONEOS | · | 1.1 km | MPC · JPL |
| 400259 | 2007 RR_{65} | — | August 10, 2007 | Kitt Peak | Spacewatch | MAS | 610 m | MPC · JPL |
| 400260 | 2007 RK_{87} | — | September 10, 2007 | Mount Lemmon | Mount Lemmon Survey | NYS | 1.2 km | MPC · JPL |
| 400261 | 2007 RM_{115} | — | September 11, 2007 | Kitt Peak | Spacewatch | · | 930 m | MPC · JPL |
| 400262 | 2007 RY_{117} | — | September 11, 2007 | Kitt Peak | Spacewatch | · | 850 m | MPC · JPL |
| 400263 | 2007 RP_{137} | — | September 14, 2007 | Anderson Mesa | LONEOS | T_{j} (2.99) · 3:2 · SHU | 5.4 km | MPC · JPL |
| 400264 | 2007 RW_{139} | — | September 3, 2007 | Catalina | CSS | NYS | 1.0 km | MPC · JPL |
| 400265 | 2007 RP_{143} | — | August 23, 2007 | Kitt Peak | Spacewatch | NYS | 1.1 km | MPC · JPL |
| 400266 | 2007 RP_{147} | — | September 11, 2007 | Purple Mountain | PMO NEO Survey Program | · | 1.4 km | MPC · JPL |
| 400267 | 2007 RU_{148} | — | September 12, 2007 | Catalina | CSS | · | 880 m | MPC · JPL |
| 400268 | 2007 RO_{149} | — | September 12, 2007 | Catalina | CSS | ERI | 1.4 km | MPC · JPL |
| 400269 | 2007 RE_{206} | — | August 10, 2007 | Kitt Peak | Spacewatch | MAS | 780 m | MPC · JPL |
| 400270 | 2007 RA_{218} | — | September 13, 2007 | Mount Lemmon | Mount Lemmon Survey | · | 1.1 km | MPC · JPL |
| 400271 | 2007 RQ_{220} | — | September 14, 2007 | Mount Lemmon | Mount Lemmon Survey | · | 1.1 km | MPC · JPL |
| 400272 | 2007 RL_{227} | — | September 10, 2007 | Kitt Peak | Spacewatch | · | 1.1 km | MPC · JPL |
| 400273 | 2007 RO_{233} | — | September 5, 2007 | Catalina | CSS | · | 1.3 km | MPC · JPL |
| 400274 | 2007 RF_{235} | — | September 12, 2007 | Mount Lemmon | Mount Lemmon Survey | · | 1.0 km | MPC · JPL |
| 400275 | 2007 RE_{243} | — | September 3, 2007 | Catalina | CSS | · | 1.1 km | MPC · JPL |
| 400276 | 2007 RC_{246} | — | August 21, 2007 | Anderson Mesa | LONEOS | · | 1.1 km | MPC · JPL |
| 400277 | 2007 RO_{265} | — | August 23, 2007 | Kitt Peak | Spacewatch | · | 1.2 km | MPC · JPL |
| 400278 | 2007 RE_{301} | — | September 12, 2007 | Mount Lemmon | Mount Lemmon Survey | · | 1.0 km | MPC · JPL |
| 400279 | 2007 RP_{302} | — | September 9, 2007 | Mount Lemmon | Mount Lemmon Survey | · | 930 m | MPC · JPL |
| 400280 | 2007 RH_{310} | — | September 5, 2007 | Catalina | CSS | · | 980 m | MPC · JPL |
| 400281 | 2007 RT_{311} | — | September 4, 2007 | Catalina | CSS | · | 1.5 km | MPC · JPL |
| 400282 | 2007 RV_{314} | — | September 3, 2007 | Catalina | CSS | · | 860 m | MPC · JPL |
| 400283 | 2007 SY_{3} | — | September 16, 2007 | Socorro | LINEAR | NYS | 1.1 km | MPC · JPL |
| 400284 | 2007 SK_{10} | — | September 19, 2007 | Kitt Peak | Spacewatch | · | 1.1 km | MPC · JPL |
| 400285 | 2007 SO_{20} | — | September 18, 2007 | Mount Lemmon | Mount Lemmon Survey | MAS | 640 m | MPC · JPL |
| 400286 | 2007 TQ_{9} | — | September 8, 2007 | Anderson Mesa | LONEOS | MAS | 790 m | MPC · JPL |
| 400287 | 2007 TE_{10} | — | September 11, 2007 | Mount Lemmon | Mount Lemmon Survey | NYS | 1.4 km | MPC · JPL |
| 400288 | 2007 TJ_{46} | — | October 7, 2007 | Mount Lemmon | Mount Lemmon Survey | · | 1.6 km | MPC · JPL |
| 400289 | 2007 TH_{51} | — | October 4, 2007 | Kitt Peak | Spacewatch | · | 1.1 km | MPC · JPL |
| 400290 | 2007 TT_{64} | — | October 7, 2007 | Mount Lemmon | Mount Lemmon Survey | MAS | 710 m | MPC · JPL |
| 400291 | 2007 TS_{69} | — | October 14, 2007 | Wrightwood | J. W. Young | · | 1.5 km | MPC · JPL |
| 400292 | 2007 TM_{79} | — | October 5, 2007 | Kitt Peak | Spacewatch | NYS | 1.3 km | MPC · JPL |
| 400293 | 2007 TU_{89} | — | October 8, 2007 | Mount Lemmon | Mount Lemmon Survey | NYS | 990 m | MPC · JPL |
| 400294 | 2007 TJ_{91} | — | October 13, 2007 | Dauban | Chante-Perdrix | · | 1.2 km | MPC · JPL |
| 400295 | 2007 TL_{111} | — | September 3, 2007 | Catalina | CSS | · | 1.6 km | MPC · JPL |
| 400296 | 2007 TJ_{119} | — | October 9, 2007 | Kitt Peak | Spacewatch | · | 2.2 km | MPC · JPL |
| 400297 | 2007 TQ_{124} | — | October 6, 2007 | Kitt Peak | Spacewatch | T_{j} (2.96) | 4.4 km | MPC · JPL |
| 400298 | 2007 TU_{124} | — | September 15, 2007 | Mount Lemmon | Mount Lemmon Survey | · | 1.7 km | MPC · JPL |
| 400299 | 2007 TN_{126} | — | September 9, 2007 | Mount Lemmon | Mount Lemmon Survey | · | 910 m | MPC · JPL |
| 400300 | 2007 TQ_{126} | — | October 6, 2007 | Kitt Peak | Spacewatch | · | 1.2 km | MPC · JPL |

== 400301–400400 ==
back to top

| Designation | | | Discovery | | | Properties | | Ref |
| Permanent | Provisional | Named after | Date | Site | Discoverer(s) | Category | Diam. | Ref |
|---|---|---|---|---|---|---|---|---|
| 400301 | 2007 TU_{134} | — | October 8, 2007 | Kitt Peak | Spacewatch | · | 960 m | MPC · JPL |
| 400302 | 2007 TD_{136} | — | October 8, 2007 | Kitt Peak | Spacewatch | MAS | 790 m | MPC · JPL |
| 400303 | 2007 TT_{148} | — | October 8, 2007 | Socorro | LINEAR | PHO | 970 m | MPC · JPL |
| 400304 | 2007 TB_{150} | — | October 9, 2007 | Socorro | LINEAR | · | 1.3 km | MPC · JPL |
| 400305 | 2007 TW_{152} | — | October 9, 2007 | Socorro | LINEAR | NYS | 1.1 km | MPC · JPL |
| 400306 | 2007 TO_{182} | — | October 8, 2007 | Anderson Mesa | LONEOS | · | 1.9 km | MPC · JPL |
| 400307 | 2007 TJ_{184} | — | October 10, 2007 | Catalina | CSS | · | 1.6 km | MPC · JPL |
| 400308 Antonkutter | 2007 TX_{184} | Antonkutter | October 13, 2007 | Gaisberg | Gierlinger, R. | · | 1.2 km | MPC · JPL |
| 400309 Ralfhofner | 2007 TC_{185} | Ralfhofner | October 14, 2007 | Radebeul | M. Fiedler | · | 1.2 km | MPC · JPL |
| 400310 | 2007 TX_{185} | — | October 13, 2007 | Socorro | LINEAR | · | 1.3 km | MPC · JPL |
| 400311 | 2007 TD_{244} | — | October 8, 2007 | Catalina | CSS | · | 920 m | MPC · JPL |
| 400312 | 2007 TE_{244} | — | October 8, 2007 | Catalina | CSS | 3:2 · (3561) | 9.1 km | MPC · JPL |
| 400313 | 2007 TH_{274} | — | September 12, 2007 | Mount Lemmon | Mount Lemmon Survey | NYS | 1.2 km | MPC · JPL |
| 400314 | 2007 TT_{281} | — | October 7, 2007 | Mount Lemmon | Mount Lemmon Survey | · | 2.4 km | MPC · JPL |
| 400315 | 2007 TT_{325} | — | November 18, 2003 | Kitt Peak | Spacewatch | · | 1.4 km | MPC · JPL |
| 400316 | 2007 TT_{330} | — | October 11, 2007 | Kitt Peak | Spacewatch | · | 1.2 km | MPC · JPL |
| 400317 | 2007 TP_{332} | — | October 11, 2007 | Kitt Peak | Spacewatch | T_{j} (2.96) | 3.7 km | MPC · JPL |
| 400318 | 2007 TU_{338} | — | October 11, 2007 | Catalina | CSS | · | 1.0 km | MPC · JPL |
| 400319 | 2007 TB_{356} | — | October 11, 2007 | Lulin | LUSS | · | 1.3 km | MPC · JPL |
| 400320 | 2007 TG_{357} | — | October 12, 2007 | Kitt Peak | Spacewatch | 3:2 | 4.9 km | MPC · JPL |
| 400321 | 2007 TH_{367} | — | October 10, 2007 | Catalina | CSS | · | 1.5 km | MPC · JPL |
| 400322 | 2007 TH_{385} | — | October 15, 2007 | Anderson Mesa | LONEOS | · | 1.2 km | MPC · JPL |
| 400323 | 2007 TJ_{411} | — | September 12, 2007 | Mount Lemmon | Mount Lemmon Survey | MAS | 740 m | MPC · JPL |
| 400324 | 2007 TC_{412} | — | October 14, 2007 | Catalina | CSS | · | 980 m | MPC · JPL |
| 400325 | 2007 TG_{431} | — | October 12, 2007 | Kitt Peak | Spacewatch | · | 1.1 km | MPC · JPL |
| 400326 | 2007 TS_{432} | — | October 7, 2007 | Mount Lemmon | Mount Lemmon Survey | · | 1.5 km | MPC · JPL |
| 400327 | 2007 TM_{443} | — | October 7, 2007 | Catalina | CSS | · | 1.2 km | MPC · JPL |
| 400328 | 2007 TJ_{447} | — | October 11, 2007 | Kitt Peak | Spacewatch | EUN | 1.3 km | MPC · JPL |
| 400329 | 2007 UM_{8} | — | October 16, 2007 | Catalina | CSS | · | 1.8 km | MPC · JPL |
| 400330 | 2007 UW_{10} | — | October 18, 2007 | Anderson Mesa | LONEOS | · | 1.6 km | MPC · JPL |
| 400331 | 2007 UA_{18} | — | October 16, 2007 | Catalina | CSS | · | 1.5 km | MPC · JPL |
| 400332 | 2007 UQ_{18} | — | October 17, 2007 | Mount Lemmon | Mount Lemmon Survey | · | 1.1 km | MPC · JPL |
| 400333 | 2007 UO_{33} | — | October 16, 2007 | Catalina | CSS | · | 1.6 km | MPC · JPL |
| 400334 | 2007 UB_{34} | — | October 16, 2007 | Catalina | CSS | KON | 2.1 km | MPC · JPL |
| 400335 | 2007 UO_{34} | — | October 18, 2007 | Anderson Mesa | LONEOS | · | 1.6 km | MPC · JPL |
| 400336 | 2007 UZ_{52} | — | October 6, 2007 | Kitt Peak | Spacewatch | · | 1.9 km | MPC · JPL |
| 400337 | 2007 UZ_{65} | — | October 31, 2007 | Gnosca | S. Sposetti | · | 950 m | MPC · JPL |
| 400338 | 2007 UC_{71} | — | October 10, 2007 | Kitt Peak | Spacewatch | · | 1.6 km | MPC · JPL |
| 400339 | 2007 UL_{82} | — | October 30, 2007 | Kitt Peak | Spacewatch | MAS | 730 m | MPC · JPL |
| 400340 | 2007 UO_{100} | — | October 16, 2007 | Mount Lemmon | Mount Lemmon Survey | · | 1.6 km | MPC · JPL |
| 400341 | 2007 UB_{127} | — | October 20, 2007 | Mount Lemmon | Mount Lemmon Survey | · | 1.6 km | MPC · JPL |
| 400342 | 2007 UY_{132} | — | October 20, 2007 | Mount Lemmon | Mount Lemmon Survey | NYS | 1.4 km | MPC · JPL |
| 400343 | 2007 VJ_{2} | — | November 2, 2007 | Socorro | LINEAR | · | 1.8 km | MPC · JPL |
| 400344 | 2007 VP_{12} | — | October 16, 2007 | Catalina | CSS | · | 1.8 km | MPC · JPL |
| 400345 | 2007 VC_{40} | — | November 3, 2007 | Mount Lemmon | Mount Lemmon Survey | T_{j} (2.97) · 3:2 | 5.0 km | MPC · JPL |
| 400346 | 2007 VT_{47} | — | November 1, 2007 | Kitt Peak | Spacewatch | · | 1.2 km | MPC · JPL |
| 400347 | 2007 VD_{59} | — | November 1, 2007 | Kitt Peak | Spacewatch | · | 1.5 km | MPC · JPL |
| 400348 | 2007 VO_{61} | — | October 16, 2007 | Mount Lemmon | Mount Lemmon Survey | · | 1.1 km | MPC · JPL |
| 400349 | 2007 VG_{80} | — | October 16, 2007 | Mount Lemmon | Mount Lemmon Survey | EUN | 1.1 km | MPC · JPL |
| 400350 | 2007 VD_{84} | — | November 7, 2007 | Mayhill | Lowe, A. | (5) | 1.3 km | MPC · JPL |
| 400351 | 2007 VK_{91} | — | November 7, 2007 | Socorro | LINEAR | HNS | 1.5 km | MPC · JPL |
| 400352 | 2007 VA_{100} | — | October 24, 2007 | Mount Lemmon | Mount Lemmon Survey | (5) | 1.2 km | MPC · JPL |
| 400353 | 2007 VX_{104} | — | November 3, 2007 | Kitt Peak | Spacewatch | · | 1.2 km | MPC · JPL |
| 400354 | 2007 VV_{109} | — | November 3, 2007 | Kitt Peak | Spacewatch | · | 1.4 km | MPC · JPL |
| 400355 | 2007 VX_{126} | — | November 3, 2007 | Kitt Peak | Spacewatch | H | 490 m | MPC · JPL |
| 400356 | 2007 VP_{135} | — | November 3, 2007 | Mount Lemmon | Mount Lemmon Survey | H | 650 m | MPC · JPL |
| 400357 | 2007 VW_{156} | — | November 5, 2007 | Kitt Peak | Spacewatch | · | 1.4 km | MPC · JPL |
| 400358 | 2007 VN_{161} | — | November 5, 2007 | Kitt Peak | Spacewatch | EUN | 1.3 km | MPC · JPL |
| 400359 | 2007 VH_{173} | — | November 2, 2007 | Mount Lemmon | Mount Lemmon Survey | T_{j} (2.94) | 4.2 km | MPC · JPL |
| 400360 | 2007 VY_{180} | — | November 7, 2007 | Catalina | CSS | 3:2 | 5.9 km | MPC · JPL |
| 400361 | 2007 VL_{189} | — | October 5, 2007 | Kitt Peak | Spacewatch | HNS | 960 m | MPC · JPL |
| 400362 | 2007 VK_{219} | — | November 9, 2007 | Kitt Peak | Spacewatch | · | 1.2 km | MPC · JPL |
| 400363 | 2007 VE_{226} | — | October 20, 2007 | Mount Lemmon | Mount Lemmon Survey | ADE | 2.0 km | MPC · JPL |
| 400364 | 2007 VG_{272} | — | November 11, 2007 | Mount Lemmon | Mount Lemmon Survey | · | 1.3 km | MPC · JPL |
| 400365 | 2007 VQ_{297} | — | September 12, 2007 | Catalina | CSS | · | 2.8 km | MPC · JPL |
| 400366 | 2007 VT_{306} | — | November 1, 2007 | Kitt Peak | Spacewatch | · | 1.4 km | MPC · JPL |
| 400367 | 2007 VQ_{308} | — | November 7, 2007 | Kitt Peak | Spacewatch | · | 1.1 km | MPC · JPL |
| 400368 | 2007 VG_{313} | — | November 8, 2007 | Kitt Peak | Spacewatch | · | 1.1 km | MPC · JPL |
| 400369 | 2007 VT_{332} | — | November 8, 2007 | Mount Lemmon | Mount Lemmon Survey | · | 1.8 km | MPC · JPL |
| 400370 | 2007 WM_{4} | — | November 19, 2007 | Mount Lemmon | Mount Lemmon Survey | BAR | 1.3 km | MPC · JPL |
| 400371 | 2007 WP_{10} | — | November 17, 2007 | Mount Lemmon | Mount Lemmon Survey | · | 1.4 km | MPC · JPL |
| 400372 | 2007 WK_{21} | — | November 17, 2007 | Kitt Peak | Spacewatch | · | 1.3 km | MPC · JPL |
| 400373 | 2007 WW_{29} | — | November 19, 2007 | Kitt Peak | Spacewatch | · | 1.3 km | MPC · JPL |
| 400374 | 2007 WD_{58} | — | November 20, 2007 | Mount Lemmon | Mount Lemmon Survey | · | 1.5 km | MPC · JPL |
| 400375 | 2007 WP_{63} | — | November 21, 2007 | Catalina | CSS | GAL | 1.8 km | MPC · JPL |
| 400376 | 2007 XX_{2} | — | December 3, 2007 | Kitt Peak | Spacewatch | H | 550 m | MPC · JPL |
| 400377 | 2007 XL_{42} | — | November 8, 2007 | Mount Lemmon | Mount Lemmon Survey | · | 1.3 km | MPC · JPL |
| 400378 | 2007 XT_{50} | — | December 3, 2007 | Catalina | CSS | H | 740 m | MPC · JPL |
| 400379 | 2007 XH_{51} | — | December 4, 2007 | Kitt Peak | Spacewatch | · | 1.2 km | MPC · JPL |
| 400380 | 2007 XN_{54} | — | December 14, 2007 | Mount Lemmon | Mount Lemmon Survey | · | 990 m | MPC · JPL |
| 400381 | 2007 YB_{24} | — | December 17, 2007 | Mount Lemmon | Mount Lemmon Survey | EUN | 1.4 km | MPC · JPL |
| 400382 | 2007 YA_{32} | — | December 30, 2007 | Socorro | LINEAR | H | 590 m | MPC · JPL |
| 400383 | 2007 YN_{37} | — | December 3, 2007 | Kitt Peak | Spacewatch | HNS | 1.4 km | MPC · JPL |
| 400384 | 2007 YX_{45} | — | November 8, 2007 | Mount Lemmon | Mount Lemmon Survey | · | 1.4 km | MPC · JPL |
| 400385 | 2007 YP_{46} | — | December 30, 2007 | Mount Lemmon | Mount Lemmon Survey | H | 650 m | MPC · JPL |
| 400386 | 2007 YV_{49} | — | December 5, 2007 | Mount Lemmon | Mount Lemmon Survey | EUN | 1.4 km | MPC · JPL |
| 400387 | 2007 YH_{56} | — | December 30, 2007 | Junk Bond | D. Healy | · | 2.3 km | MPC · JPL |
| 400388 | 2007 YW_{56} | — | December 15, 2007 | Mount Lemmon | Mount Lemmon Survey | HNS | 1.2 km | MPC · JPL |
| 400389 | 2007 YJ_{74} | — | December 31, 2007 | Mount Lemmon | Mount Lemmon Survey | JUN | 1.2 km | MPC · JPL |
| 400390 | 2008 AH | — | December 14, 2007 | Mount Lemmon | Mount Lemmon Survey | MAR | 1.5 km | MPC · JPL |
| 400391 | 2008 AT_{6} | — | November 13, 2007 | Kitt Peak | Spacewatch | · | 1.6 km | MPC · JPL |
| 400392 | 2008 AL_{7} | — | January 10, 2008 | Kitt Peak | Spacewatch | · | 2.4 km | MPC · JPL |
| 400393 | 2008 AG_{62} | — | January 11, 2008 | Mount Lemmon | Mount Lemmon Survey | V | 740 m | MPC · JPL |
| 400394 | 2008 AM_{64} | — | January 11, 2008 | Mount Lemmon | Mount Lemmon Survey | · | 1.6 km | MPC · JPL |
| 400395 | 2008 AL_{77} | — | January 12, 2008 | Kitt Peak | Spacewatch | · | 2.8 km | MPC · JPL |
| 400396 | 2008 AK_{80} | — | January 12, 2008 | Kitt Peak | Spacewatch | · | 1.8 km | MPC · JPL |
| 400397 | 2008 AY_{80} | — | January 12, 2008 | Kitt Peak | Spacewatch | · | 1.5 km | MPC · JPL |
| 400398 | 2008 AJ_{92} | — | January 14, 2008 | Kitt Peak | Spacewatch | · | 2.4 km | MPC · JPL |
| 400399 | 2008 AP_{94} | — | January 14, 2008 | Kitt Peak | Spacewatch | · | 1.4 km | MPC · JPL |
| 400400 | 2008 AJ_{95} | — | December 31, 2007 | Kitt Peak | Spacewatch | · | 1.7 km | MPC · JPL |

== 400401–400500 ==
back to top

| Designation | | | Discovery | | | Properties | | Ref |
| Permanent | Provisional | Named after | Date | Site | Discoverer(s) | Category | Diam. | Ref |
|---|---|---|---|---|---|---|---|---|
| 400401 | 2008 AJ_{110} | — | January 15, 2008 | Kitt Peak | Spacewatch | HNS | 1.3 km | MPC · JPL |
| 400402 | 2008 AP_{111} | — | January 15, 2008 | Kitt Peak | Spacewatch | · | 2.1 km | MPC · JPL |
| 400403 | 2008 BJ_{3} | — | November 18, 2007 | Mount Lemmon | Mount Lemmon Survey | · | 2.2 km | MPC · JPL |
| 400404 | 2008 BP_{3} | — | December 18, 2007 | Mount Lemmon | Mount Lemmon Survey | · | 1.5 km | MPC · JPL |
| 400405 | 2008 BU_{17} | — | January 30, 2008 | Catalina | CSS | · | 2.6 km | MPC · JPL |
| 400406 | 2008 BO_{20} | — | January 30, 2008 | Catalina | CSS | · | 2.6 km | MPC · JPL |
| 400407 | 2008 BD_{44} | — | January 30, 2008 | Catalina | CSS | (5) | 1.3 km | MPC · JPL |
| 400408 | 2008 BW_{47} | — | January 31, 2008 | Mount Lemmon | Mount Lemmon Survey | · | 5.0 km | MPC · JPL |
| 400409 | 2008 CF_{6} | — | February 7, 2008 | Mount Lemmon | Mount Lemmon Survey | T_{j} (2.98) · EUP | 4.3 km | MPC · JPL |
| 400410 | 2008 CE_{16} | — | February 3, 2008 | Mount Lemmon | Mount Lemmon Survey | · | 2.2 km | MPC · JPL |
| 400411 | 2008 CQ_{22} | — | February 5, 2008 | La Sagra | OAM | H | 760 m | MPC · JPL |
| 400412 | 2008 CL_{33} | — | September 24, 2007 | Kitt Peak | Spacewatch | · | 1.9 km | MPC · JPL |
| 400413 | 2008 CG_{43} | — | February 2, 2008 | Kitt Peak | Spacewatch | · | 2.3 km | MPC · JPL |
| 400414 | 2008 CH_{54} | — | December 16, 2007 | Kitt Peak | Spacewatch | · | 2.4 km | MPC · JPL |
| 400415 | 2008 CM_{61} | — | February 3, 2008 | Kitt Peak | Spacewatch | · | 2.3 km | MPC · JPL |
| 400416 | 2008 CY_{68} | — | October 3, 2006 | Mount Lemmon | Mount Lemmon Survey | · | 2.8 km | MPC · JPL |
| 400417 | 2008 CJ_{73} | — | February 6, 2008 | Catalina | CSS | EUN | 1.2 km | MPC · JPL |
| 400418 | 2008 CE_{78} | — | February 7, 2008 | Kitt Peak | Spacewatch | · | 1.3 km | MPC · JPL |
| 400419 | 2008 CL_{88} | — | February 7, 2008 | Mount Lemmon | Mount Lemmon Survey | · | 2.3 km | MPC · JPL |
| 400420 | 2008 CM_{98} | — | February 9, 2008 | Kitt Peak | Spacewatch | AGN | 1.2 km | MPC · JPL |
| 400421 | 2008 CQ_{100} | — | February 9, 2008 | Catalina | CSS | · | 2.8 km | MPC · JPL |
| 400422 | 2008 CN_{104} | — | February 9, 2008 | Mount Lemmon | Mount Lemmon Survey | AGN | 1.2 km | MPC · JPL |
| 400423 | 2008 CG_{115} | — | January 11, 2008 | Catalina | CSS | H | 760 m | MPC · JPL |
| 400424 | 2008 CN_{126} | — | February 8, 2008 | Kitt Peak | Spacewatch | TRE | 2.2 km | MPC · JPL |
| 400425 | 2008 CX_{126} | — | January 30, 2008 | Mount Lemmon | Mount Lemmon Survey | · | 1.5 km | MPC · JPL |
| 400426 | 2008 CO_{153} | — | February 9, 2008 | Kitt Peak | Spacewatch | EUN | 1.3 km | MPC · JPL |
| 400427 | 2008 CD_{154} | — | February 9, 2008 | Kitt Peak | Spacewatch | · | 1.8 km | MPC · JPL |
| 400428 | 2008 CG_{165} | — | February 10, 2008 | Kitt Peak | Spacewatch | · | 2.2 km | MPC · JPL |
| 400429 | 2008 CK_{178} | — | January 11, 2008 | Catalina | CSS | · | 2.4 km | MPC · JPL |
| 400430 | 2008 CH_{190} | — | February 13, 2008 | Catalina | CSS | · | 4.2 km | MPC · JPL |
| 400431 | 2008 CL_{204} | — | February 7, 2008 | Mount Lemmon | Mount Lemmon Survey | · | 2.9 km | MPC · JPL |
| 400432 | 2008 CN_{214} | — | February 11, 2008 | Kitt Peak | Spacewatch | · | 2.0 km | MPC · JPL |
| 400433 | 2008 DM_{8} | — | February 24, 2008 | Mount Lemmon | Mount Lemmon Survey | · | 2.8 km | MPC · JPL |
| 400434 | 2008 DP_{8} | — | February 24, 2008 | Bergisch Gladbach | W. Bickel | · | 2.3 km | MPC · JPL |
| 400435 | 2008 DA_{23} | — | January 14, 2008 | Kitt Peak | Spacewatch | · | 3.0 km | MPC · JPL |
| 400436 | 2008 DE_{46} | — | February 10, 2008 | Mount Lemmon | Mount Lemmon Survey | · | 1.9 km | MPC · JPL |
| 400437 | 2008 DQ_{60} | — | February 28, 2008 | Mount Lemmon | Mount Lemmon Survey | KOR | 1.6 km | MPC · JPL |
| 400438 | 2008 DS_{68} | — | February 29, 2008 | Kitt Peak | Spacewatch | · | 2.3 km | MPC · JPL |
| 400439 | 2008 DE_{79} | — | February 29, 2008 | Kitt Peak | Spacewatch | EUP | 3.4 km | MPC · JPL |
| 400440 | 2008 DG_{81} | — | February 27, 2008 | Kitt Peak | Spacewatch | · | 1.9 km | MPC · JPL |
| 400441 | 2008 EM_{1} | — | January 30, 2008 | Catalina | CSS | · | 2.3 km | MPC · JPL |
| 400442 | 2008 EA_{3} | — | March 1, 2008 | Mount Lemmon | Mount Lemmon Survey | · | 2.2 km | MPC · JPL |
| 400443 | 2008 EH_{29} | — | March 4, 2008 | Mount Lemmon | Mount Lemmon Survey | · | 2.8 km | MPC · JPL |
| 400444 | 2008 EX_{34} | — | March 2, 2008 | Kitt Peak | Spacewatch | · | 2.6 km | MPC · JPL |
| 400445 | 2008 EV_{41} | — | March 4, 2008 | Kitt Peak | Spacewatch | · | 2.5 km | MPC · JPL |
| 400446 | 2008 EH_{64} | — | March 9, 2008 | Mount Lemmon | Mount Lemmon Survey | WIT | 940 m | MPC · JPL |
| 400447 | 2008 EJ_{81} | — | March 16, 2004 | Kitt Peak | Spacewatch | · | 1.8 km | MPC · JPL |
| 400448 | 2008 EA_{135} | — | March 11, 2008 | Kitt Peak | Spacewatch | · | 1.7 km | MPC · JPL |
| 400449 | 2008 EG_{137} | — | February 28, 2008 | Kitt Peak | Spacewatch | · | 2.4 km | MPC · JPL |
| 400450 | 2008 EM_{147} | — | March 1, 2008 | Kitt Peak | Spacewatch | · | 2.9 km | MPC · JPL |
| 400451 | 2008 EO_{152} | — | March 10, 2008 | Mount Lemmon | Mount Lemmon Survey | · | 2.8 km | MPC · JPL |
| 400452 | 2008 EP_{154} | — | March 5, 2008 | Kitt Peak | Spacewatch | · | 2.7 km | MPC · JPL |
| 400453 | 2008 EH_{162} | — | March 13, 2008 | Kitt Peak | Spacewatch | · | 1.9 km | MPC · JPL |
| 400454 | 2008 FJ_{22} | — | March 27, 2008 | Kitt Peak | Spacewatch | · | 3.9 km | MPC · JPL |
| 400455 | 2008 FD_{25} | — | March 12, 2008 | Mount Lemmon | Mount Lemmon Survey | · | 4.1 km | MPC · JPL |
| 400456 | 2008 FC_{35} | — | February 27, 2008 | Mount Lemmon | Mount Lemmon Survey | EOS | 1.7 km | MPC · JPL |
| 400457 | 2008 FU_{37} | — | March 28, 2008 | Kitt Peak | Spacewatch | · | 2.7 km | MPC · JPL |
| 400458 | 2008 FT_{52} | — | March 10, 2008 | Kitt Peak | Spacewatch | THM | 2.1 km | MPC · JPL |
| 400459 | 2008 FN_{53} | — | March 28, 2008 | Mount Lemmon | Mount Lemmon Survey | THM | 2.2 km | MPC · JPL |
| 400460 | 2008 FT_{65} | — | March 28, 2008 | Mount Lemmon | Mount Lemmon Survey | · | 3.5 km | MPC · JPL |
| 400461 | 2008 FP_{96} | — | March 29, 2008 | Catalina | CSS | · | 1.9 km | MPC · JPL |
| 400462 | 2008 FX_{106} | — | March 31, 2008 | Kitt Peak | Spacewatch | · | 2.0 km | MPC · JPL |
| 400463 | 2008 FB_{116} | — | March 15, 2008 | Kitt Peak | Spacewatch | KOR | 1.3 km | MPC · JPL |
| 400464 | 2008 FW_{131} | — | March 28, 2008 | Mount Lemmon | Mount Lemmon Survey | EOS | 1.7 km | MPC · JPL |
| 400465 | 2008 FV_{134} | — | March 30, 2008 | Kitt Peak | Spacewatch | · | 2.3 km | MPC · JPL |
| 400466 | 2008 GJ_{4} | — | April 7, 2008 | Grove Creek | Tozzi, F. | T_{j} (2.94) | 3.6 km | MPC · JPL |
| 400467 | 2008 GG_{11} | — | April 1, 2008 | Kitt Peak | Spacewatch | HYG | 2.6 km | MPC · JPL |
| 400468 | 2008 GS_{17} | — | April 4, 2008 | Kitt Peak | Spacewatch | · | 2.0 km | MPC · JPL |
| 400469 | 2008 GB_{19} | — | April 4, 2008 | Mount Lemmon | Mount Lemmon Survey | · | 4.2 km | MPC · JPL |
| 400470 | 2008 GZ_{23} | — | March 4, 2008 | Mount Lemmon | Mount Lemmon Survey | EOS | 2.0 km | MPC · JPL |
| 400471 | 2008 GZ_{25} | — | December 27, 2006 | Mount Lemmon | Mount Lemmon Survey | · | 1.7 km | MPC · JPL |
| 400472 | 2008 GT_{29} | — | March 5, 2008 | Kitt Peak | Spacewatch | · | 2.6 km | MPC · JPL |
| 400473 | 2008 GG_{37} | — | April 3, 2008 | Kitt Peak | Spacewatch | · | 2.6 km | MPC · JPL |
| 400474 | 2008 GC_{43} | — | April 4, 2008 | Mount Lemmon | Mount Lemmon Survey | EOS | 1.7 km | MPC · JPL |
| 400475 | 2008 GG_{47} | — | April 4, 2008 | Kitt Peak | Spacewatch | · | 3.9 km | MPC · JPL |
| 400476 | 2008 GS_{49} | — | March 28, 2008 | Mount Lemmon | Mount Lemmon Survey | · | 3.2 km | MPC · JPL |
| 400477 | 2008 GU_{57} | — | April 5, 2008 | Mount Lemmon | Mount Lemmon Survey | · | 2.0 km | MPC · JPL |
| 400478 | 2008 GC_{82} | — | December 25, 2006 | Kitt Peak | Spacewatch | · | 2.5 km | MPC · JPL |
| 400479 | 2008 GP_{89} | — | February 12, 2008 | Mount Lemmon | Mount Lemmon Survey | · | 2.7 km | MPC · JPL |
| 400480 | 2008 GB_{132} | — | April 6, 2008 | Mount Lemmon | Mount Lemmon Survey | · | 3.0 km | MPC · JPL |
| 400481 | 2008 GO_{139} | — | April 5, 2008 | Kitt Peak | Spacewatch | · | 3.0 km | MPC · JPL |
| 400482 | 2008 HV_{1} | — | April 24, 2008 | Kitt Peak | Spacewatch | · | 2.5 km | MPC · JPL |
| 400483 | 2008 HF_{4} | — | April 27, 2008 | Dauban | Kugel, F. | · | 3.8 km | MPC · JPL |
| 400484 | 2008 HL_{7} | — | April 24, 2008 | Kitt Peak | Spacewatch | · | 2.8 km | MPC · JPL |
| 400485 | 2008 HX_{8} | — | April 11, 2008 | Mount Lemmon | Mount Lemmon Survey | · | 3.3 km | MPC · JPL |
| 400486 | 2008 HL_{10} | — | May 1, 2003 | Kitt Peak | Spacewatch | · | 1.6 km | MPC · JPL |
| 400487 | 2008 HH_{24} | — | April 3, 2008 | Mount Lemmon | Mount Lemmon Survey | EOS | 2.1 km | MPC · JPL |
| 400488 | 2008 HM_{34} | — | April 27, 2008 | Kitt Peak | Spacewatch | · | 2.6 km | MPC · JPL |
| 400489 | 2008 HW_{57} | — | April 30, 2008 | Kitt Peak | Spacewatch | EOS | 1.8 km | MPC · JPL |
| 400490 | 2008 HJ_{69} | — | February 24, 2008 | Mount Lemmon | Mount Lemmon Survey | · | 3.3 km | MPC · JPL |
| 400491 | 2008 JW_{3} | — | May 1, 2008 | Kitt Peak | Spacewatch | · | 2.6 km | MPC · JPL |
| 400492 | 2008 JG_{4} | — | May 1, 2008 | Kitt Peak | Spacewatch | · | 2.6 km | MPC · JPL |
| 400493 | 2008 JJ_{5} | — | May 3, 2008 | Mount Lemmon | Mount Lemmon Survey | · | 2.0 km | MPC · JPL |
| 400494 | 2008 JK_{6} | — | May 2, 2008 | Kitt Peak | Spacewatch | URS | 3.0 km | MPC · JPL |
| 400495 | 2008 JF_{9} | — | April 14, 2008 | Mount Lemmon | Mount Lemmon Survey | · | 3.0 km | MPC · JPL |
| 400496 | 2008 JS_{11} | — | April 3, 2008 | Mount Lemmon | Mount Lemmon Survey | · | 3.4 km | MPC · JPL |
| 400497 | 2008 JZ_{17} | — | May 4, 2008 | Kitt Peak | Spacewatch | · | 4.2 km | MPC · JPL |
| 400498 | 2008 JF_{23} | — | May 7, 2008 | Kitt Peak | Spacewatch | · | 4.2 km | MPC · JPL |
| 400499 | 2008 JV_{25} | — | April 14, 2008 | Mount Lemmon | Mount Lemmon Survey | · | 3.5 km | MPC · JPL |
| 400500 | 2008 JH_{36} | — | May 3, 2008 | Mount Lemmon | Mount Lemmon Survey | · | 3.0 km | MPC · JPL |

== 400501–400600 ==
back to top

| Designation | | | Discovery | | | Properties | | Ref |
| Permanent | Provisional | Named after | Date | Site | Discoverer(s) | Category | Diam. | Ref |
|---|---|---|---|---|---|---|---|---|
| 400501 | 2008 KN_{8} | — | May 27, 2008 | Kitt Peak | Spacewatch | TIR | 3.0 km | MPC · JPL |
| 400502 | 2008 KK_{15} | — | May 15, 2008 | Kitt Peak | Spacewatch | · | 3.5 km | MPC · JPL |
| 400503 | 2008 KF_{17} | — | May 27, 2008 | Kitt Peak | Spacewatch | LIX | 3.4 km | MPC · JPL |
| 400504 | 2008 KT_{25} | — | April 3, 2008 | Mount Lemmon | Mount Lemmon Survey | EUP | 3.1 km | MPC · JPL |
| 400505 | 2008 KN_{27} | — | May 30, 2008 | Kitt Peak | Spacewatch | · | 2.7 km | MPC · JPL |
| 400506 | 2008 KP_{41} | — | May 31, 2008 | Kitt Peak | Spacewatch | · | 2.7 km | MPC · JPL |
| 400507 | 2008 KX_{41} | — | May 31, 2008 | Kitt Peak | Spacewatch | · | 3.2 km | MPC · JPL |
| 400508 | 2008 KW_{42} | — | April 13, 2008 | Mount Lemmon | Mount Lemmon Survey | CYB | 3.2 km | MPC · JPL |
| 400509 | 2008 LP_{8} | — | June 6, 2008 | Kitt Peak | Spacewatch | · | 3.3 km | MPC · JPL |
| 400510 | 2008 OA_{13} | — | July 29, 2008 | La Sagra | OAM | · | 840 m | MPC · JPL |
| 400511 | 2008 RF_{89} | — | September 5, 2008 | Kitt Peak | Spacewatch | · | 750 m | MPC · JPL |
| 400512 | 2008 RC_{140} | — | September 7, 2008 | Mount Lemmon | Mount Lemmon Survey | · | 1.3 km | MPC · JPL |
| 400513 | 2008 SP_{3} | — | September 25, 2005 | Kitt Peak | Spacewatch | · | 1.1 km | MPC · JPL |
| 400514 | 2008 SN_{59} | — | September 20, 2008 | Kitt Peak | Spacewatch | · | 2.2 km | MPC · JPL |
| 400515 | 2008 SY_{63} | — | September 21, 2008 | Kitt Peak | Spacewatch | · | 760 m | MPC · JPL |
| 400516 | 2008 SV_{73} | — | September 4, 2008 | Kitt Peak | Spacewatch | · | 1.0 km | MPC · JPL |
| 400517 | 2008 SP_{119} | — | September 22, 2008 | Mount Lemmon | Mount Lemmon Survey | · | 580 m | MPC · JPL |
| 400518 | 2008 SL_{166} | — | September 28, 2008 | Socorro | LINEAR | · | 960 m | MPC · JPL |
| 400519 | 2008 SB_{196} | — | September 25, 2008 | Kitt Peak | Spacewatch | 3:2 | 4.9 km | MPC · JPL |
| 400520 | 2008 SJ_{223} | — | September 25, 2008 | Mount Lemmon | Mount Lemmon Survey | (2076) | 790 m | MPC · JPL |
| 400521 | 2008 SH_{236} | — | September 29, 2008 | Catalina | CSS | EUP | 4.5 km | MPC · JPL |
| 400522 | 2008 SN_{243} | — | September 29, 2008 | Kitt Peak | Spacewatch | · | 700 m | MPC · JPL |
| 400523 | 2008 SY_{245} | — | September 29, 2008 | Mount Lemmon | Mount Lemmon Survey | · | 910 m | MPC · JPL |
| 400524 | 2008 SR_{257} | — | September 22, 2008 | Kitt Peak | Spacewatch | V | 860 m | MPC · JPL |
| 400525 | 2008 SU_{266} | — | September 20, 2008 | Kitt Peak | Spacewatch | · | 850 m | MPC · JPL |
| 400526 | 2008 SK_{273} | — | September 24, 2008 | Mount Lemmon | Mount Lemmon Survey | · | 1.7 km | MPC · JPL |
| 400527 | 2008 SL_{283} | — | September 22, 2008 | Mount Lemmon | Mount Lemmon Survey | · | 700 m | MPC · JPL |
| 400528 | 2008 SM_{309} | — | September 27, 2008 | Mount Lemmon | Mount Lemmon Survey | 3:2 · SHU | 4.7 km | MPC · JPL |
| 400529 | 2008 TZ_{6} | — | September 19, 2008 | Kitt Peak | Spacewatch | · | 480 m | MPC · JPL |
| 400530 | 2008 TA_{60} | — | October 2, 2008 | Kitt Peak | Spacewatch | · | 660 m | MPC · JPL |
| 400531 | 2008 TW_{65} | — | October 2, 2008 | Catalina | CSS | · | 600 m | MPC · JPL |
| 400532 | 2008 UF_{38} | — | October 20, 2008 | Kitt Peak | Spacewatch | PHO | 930 m | MPC · JPL |
| 400533 | 2008 UT_{47} | — | October 20, 2008 | Kitt Peak | Spacewatch | V | 470 m | MPC · JPL |
| 400534 | 2008 UA_{65} | — | October 21, 2008 | Kitt Peak | Spacewatch | · | 730 m | MPC · JPL |
| 400535 | 2008 UV_{93} | — | October 25, 2008 | Socorro | LINEAR | PHO | 1.9 km | MPC · JPL |
| 400536 | 2008 UD_{111} | — | October 22, 2008 | Kitt Peak | Spacewatch | · | 610 m | MPC · JPL |
| 400537 | 2008 UP_{117} | — | October 22, 2008 | Kitt Peak | Spacewatch | · | 650 m | MPC · JPL |
| 400538 | 2008 UQ_{120} | — | October 22, 2008 | Kitt Peak | Spacewatch | V | 660 m | MPC · JPL |
| 400539 | 2008 UD_{172} | — | September 22, 2008 | Mount Lemmon | Mount Lemmon Survey | · | 1.0 km | MPC · JPL |
| 400540 | 2008 UJ_{213} | — | October 6, 2008 | Catalina | CSS | V | 710 m | MPC · JPL |
| 400541 | 2008 UU_{214} | — | October 24, 2008 | Catalina | CSS | · | 870 m | MPC · JPL |
| 400542 | 2008 UX_{226} | — | October 25, 2008 | Kitt Peak | Spacewatch | · | 830 m | MPC · JPL |
| 400543 | 2008 UX_{228} | — | October 10, 2001 | Kitt Peak | Spacewatch | · | 670 m | MPC · JPL |
| 400544 | 2008 UK_{230} | — | October 25, 2008 | Kitt Peak | Spacewatch | · | 2.9 km | MPC · JPL |
| 400545 | 2008 UE_{243} | — | October 26, 2008 | Kitt Peak | Spacewatch | · | 750 m | MPC · JPL |
| 400546 | 2008 UB_{256} | — | September 23, 2008 | Mount Lemmon | Mount Lemmon Survey | V | 660 m | MPC · JPL |
| 400547 | 2008 UT_{281} | — | October 28, 2008 | Kitt Peak | Spacewatch | · | 1.1 km | MPC · JPL |
| 400548 | 2008 UF_{286} | — | September 25, 2008 | Kitt Peak | Spacewatch | · | 730 m | MPC · JPL |
| 400549 | 2008 UF_{308} | — | July 16, 2007 | Socorro | LINEAR | · | 1.2 km | MPC · JPL |
| 400550 | 2008 UV_{320} | — | October 8, 2008 | Mount Lemmon | Mount Lemmon Survey | · | 720 m | MPC · JPL |
| 400551 | 2008 UR_{368} | — | October 25, 2008 | Mount Lemmon | Mount Lemmon Survey | · | 870 m | MPC · JPL |
| 400552 | 2008 VL_{27} | — | November 2, 2008 | Kitt Peak | Spacewatch | · | 1.1 km | MPC · JPL |
| 400553 | 2008 VK_{46} | — | September 24, 2008 | Mount Lemmon | Mount Lemmon Survey | · | 580 m | MPC · JPL |
| 400554 | 2008 VA_{58} | — | November 6, 2008 | Catalina | CSS | · | 710 m | MPC · JPL |
| 400555 | 2008 WK_{41} | — | November 17, 2008 | Kitt Peak | Spacewatch | · | 790 m | MPC · JPL |
| 400556 | 2008 WU_{42} | — | November 3, 2008 | Mount Lemmon | Mount Lemmon Survey | · | 590 m | MPC · JPL |
| 400557 | 2008 WL_{45} | — | November 17, 2008 | Kitt Peak | Spacewatch | · | 880 m | MPC · JPL |
| 400558 | 2008 WJ_{63} | — | October 21, 2008 | Mount Lemmon | Mount Lemmon Survey | · | 1.3 km | MPC · JPL |
| 400559 | 2008 WN_{66} | — | November 18, 2008 | Kitt Peak | Spacewatch | PHO | 1 km | MPC · JPL |
| 400560 | 2008 WL_{69} | — | November 18, 2008 | Kitt Peak | Spacewatch | · | 940 m | MPC · JPL |
| 400561 | 2008 WK_{80} | — | November 20, 2008 | Kitt Peak | Spacewatch | · | 1.0 km | MPC · JPL |
| 400562 | 2008 WQ_{103} | — | November 30, 2008 | Catalina | CSS | PHO | 2.8 km | MPC · JPL |
| 400563 | 2008 WX_{109} | — | November 30, 2008 | Kitt Peak | Spacewatch | · | 960 m | MPC · JPL |
| 400564 | 2008 WA_{118} | — | November 20, 2008 | Kitt Peak | Spacewatch | · | 1.5 km | MPC · JPL |
| 400565 | 2008 WG_{128} | — | November 19, 2008 | Mount Lemmon | Mount Lemmon Survey | · | 1.6 km | MPC · JPL |
| 400566 | 2008 WX_{130} | — | November 19, 2008 | Mount Lemmon | Mount Lemmon Survey | · | 1.0 km | MPC · JPL |
| 400567 | 2008 XR_{14} | — | October 29, 2008 | Kitt Peak | Spacewatch | · | 710 m | MPC · JPL |
| 400568 | 2008 XL_{43} | — | November 24, 2008 | Kitt Peak | Spacewatch | · | 1.4 km | MPC · JPL |
| 400569 | 2008 XN_{50} | — | December 3, 2008 | Mount Lemmon | Mount Lemmon Survey | V | 760 m | MPC · JPL |
| 400570 | 2008 XP_{53} | — | December 7, 2008 | Mount Lemmon | Mount Lemmon Survey | · | 1.0 km | MPC · JPL |
| 400571 | 2008 XO_{55} | — | December 4, 2008 | Kitt Peak | Spacewatch | · | 1.3 km | MPC · JPL |
| 400572 | 2008 YH_{13} | — | December 21, 2008 | Mount Lemmon | Mount Lemmon Survey | · | 1.1 km | MPC · JPL |
| 400573 | 2008 YJ_{14} | — | December 20, 2008 | Lulin | LUSS | V | 940 m | MPC · JPL |
| 400574 | 2008 YE_{16} | — | December 21, 2008 | Mount Lemmon | Mount Lemmon Survey | · | 850 m | MPC · JPL |
| 400575 | 2008 YE_{19} | — | December 21, 2008 | Mount Lemmon | Mount Lemmon Survey | · | 1.1 km | MPC · JPL |
| 400576 | 2008 YK_{37} | — | December 22, 2008 | Kitt Peak | Spacewatch | · | 850 m | MPC · JPL |
| 400577 | 2008 YG_{40} | — | December 4, 2008 | Mount Lemmon | Mount Lemmon Survey | · | 1.2 km | MPC · JPL |
| 400578 | 2008 YP_{41} | — | December 29, 2008 | Kitt Peak | Spacewatch | V | 710 m | MPC · JPL |
| 400579 | 2008 YG_{55} | — | December 3, 2008 | Mount Lemmon | Mount Lemmon Survey | V | 670 m | MPC · JPL |
| 400580 | 2008 YO_{76} | — | December 30, 2008 | Mount Lemmon | Mount Lemmon Survey | · | 1.6 km | MPC · JPL |
| 400581 | 2008 YS_{79} | — | December 30, 2008 | Mount Lemmon | Mount Lemmon Survey | · | 670 m | MPC · JPL |
| 400582 | 2008 YA_{91} | — | December 29, 2008 | Kitt Peak | Spacewatch | · | 1.5 km | MPC · JPL |
| 400583 | 2008 YX_{102} | — | December 29, 2008 | Kitt Peak | Spacewatch | MAS | 770 m | MPC · JPL |
| 400584 | 2008 YL_{105} | — | December 29, 2008 | Kitt Peak | Spacewatch | · | 1.2 km | MPC · JPL |
| 400585 | 2008 YQ_{119} | — | December 30, 2008 | Kitt Peak | Spacewatch | · | 840 m | MPC · JPL |
| 400586 | 2008 YJ_{123} | — | December 22, 2008 | Kitt Peak | Spacewatch | · | 1 km | MPC · JPL |
| 400587 | 2008 YP_{137} | — | December 30, 2008 | Kitt Peak | Spacewatch | · | 1.4 km | MPC · JPL |
| 400588 | 2008 YG_{138} | — | December 21, 2008 | Kitt Peak | Spacewatch | · | 1.8 km | MPC · JPL |
| 400589 | 2008 YA_{153} | — | December 30, 2008 | Catalina | CSS | PHO | 1.3 km | MPC · JPL |
| 400590 | 2008 YD_{155} | — | December 22, 2008 | Catalina | CSS | · | 1.7 km | MPC · JPL |
| 400591 | 2009 AZ_{3} | — | January 1, 2009 | Mount Lemmon | Mount Lemmon Survey | T_{j} (2.98) · 3:2 | 7.0 km | MPC · JPL |
| 400592 | 2009 AF_{13} | — | January 2, 2009 | Mount Lemmon | Mount Lemmon Survey | · | 620 m | MPC · JPL |
| 400593 | 2009 AT_{21} | — | December 4, 2008 | Mount Lemmon | Mount Lemmon Survey | V | 710 m | MPC · JPL |
| 400594 | 2009 AQ_{32} | — | January 15, 2009 | Kitt Peak | Spacewatch | · | 1.5 km | MPC · JPL |
| 400595 | 2009 AJ_{34} | — | November 20, 2008 | Mount Lemmon | Mount Lemmon Survey | · | 1.4 km | MPC · JPL |
| 400596 | 2009 BC_{2} | — | January 18, 2009 | Catalina | CSS | · | 2.6 km | MPC · JPL |
| 400597 | 2009 BJ_{13} | — | January 18, 2009 | Kitt Peak | Spacewatch | · | 1.8 km | MPC · JPL |
| 400598 | 2009 BY_{47} | — | January 16, 2009 | Mount Lemmon | Mount Lemmon Survey | · | 960 m | MPC · JPL |
| 400599 | 2009 BF_{56} | — | January 17, 2009 | Mount Lemmon | Mount Lemmon Survey | · | 1.2 km | MPC · JPL |
| 400600 | 2009 BT_{62} | — | January 20, 2009 | Kitt Peak | Spacewatch | (5) | 1.2 km | MPC · JPL |

== 400601–400700 ==
back to top

| Designation | | | Discovery | | | Properties | | Ref |
| Permanent | Provisional | Named after | Date | Site | Discoverer(s) | Category | Diam. | Ref |
|---|---|---|---|---|---|---|---|---|
| 400601 | 2009 BC_{71} | — | December 29, 2008 | Mount Lemmon | Mount Lemmon Survey | · | 1.5 km | MPC · JPL |
| 400602 | 2009 BL_{78} | — | November 9, 2004 | Catalina | CSS | · | 860 m | MPC · JPL |
| 400603 | 2009 BZ_{99} | — | January 28, 2009 | Catalina | CSS | · | 3.8 km | MPC · JPL |
| 400604 | 2009 BJ_{120} | — | January 31, 2009 | Kitt Peak | Spacewatch | · | 2.2 km | MPC · JPL |
| 400605 | 2009 BN_{121} | — | January 31, 2009 | Kitt Peak | Spacewatch | V | 680 m | MPC · JPL |
| 400606 | 2009 BR_{146} | — | January 30, 2009 | Mount Lemmon | Mount Lemmon Survey | · | 1.2 km | MPC · JPL |
| 400607 | 2009 BL_{148} | — | January 30, 2009 | Mount Lemmon | Mount Lemmon Survey | · | 1.5 km | MPC · JPL |
| 400608 | 2009 BL_{150} | — | January 31, 2009 | Kitt Peak | Spacewatch | AGN | 1.4 km | MPC · JPL |
| 400609 | 2009 BH_{171} | — | January 17, 2009 | Kitt Peak | Spacewatch | · | 2.0 km | MPC · JPL |
| 400610 | 2009 BL_{171} | — | January 17, 2009 | Kitt Peak | Spacewatch | (21344) | 1.7 km | MPC · JPL |
| 400611 | 2009 BP_{184} | — | January 18, 2009 | Catalina | CSS | · | 2.9 km | MPC · JPL |
| 400612 | 2009 BS_{185} | — | January 20, 2009 | Mount Lemmon | Mount Lemmon Survey | · | 2.6 km | MPC · JPL |
| 400613 | 2009 CK_{1} | — | February 3, 2009 | Mount Lemmon | Mount Lemmon Survey | · | 4.3 km | MPC · JPL |
| 400614 | 2009 CJ_{3} | — | February 9, 2005 | Kitt Peak | Spacewatch | · | 1.3 km | MPC · JPL |
| 400615 | 2009 CM_{8} | — | September 9, 2007 | Kitt Peak | Spacewatch | · | 1.3 km | MPC · JPL |
| 400616 | 2009 CE_{14} | — | February 2, 2009 | Mount Lemmon | Mount Lemmon Survey | · | 1.2 km | MPC · JPL |
| 400617 | 2009 CH_{20} | — | February 1, 2009 | Kitt Peak | Spacewatch | · | 1.2 km | MPC · JPL |
| 400618 | 2009 CA_{45} | — | February 1, 2009 | Great Shefford | Birtwhistle, P. | · | 1.4 km | MPC · JPL |
| 400619 | 2009 CE_{57} | — | November 8, 2008 | Kitt Peak | Spacewatch | · | 1.6 km | MPC · JPL |
| 400620 | 2009 CZ_{60} | — | February 14, 2009 | Mount Lemmon | Mount Lemmon Survey | · | 1.5 km | MPC · JPL |
| 400621 | 2009 DK_{18} | — | February 19, 2009 | Kitt Peak | Spacewatch | JUN | 990 m | MPC · JPL |
| 400622 | 2009 DD_{32} | — | February 20, 2009 | Kitt Peak | Spacewatch | (7744) | 1.7 km | MPC · JPL |
| 400623 | 2009 DG_{43} | — | November 30, 2008 | Mount Lemmon | Mount Lemmon Survey | · | 1.6 km | MPC · JPL |
| 400624 | 2009 DL_{59} | — | February 22, 2009 | Kitt Peak | Spacewatch | · | 1.5 km | MPC · JPL |
| 400625 | 2009 DG_{64} | — | November 9, 2007 | Kitt Peak | Spacewatch | · | 1.6 km | MPC · JPL |
| 400626 | 2009 DX_{74} | — | January 17, 2009 | Mount Lemmon | Mount Lemmon Survey | · | 950 m | MPC · JPL |
| 400627 | 2009 DX_{84} | — | February 26, 2009 | Kitt Peak | Spacewatch | · | 1.1 km | MPC · JPL |
| 400628 | 2009 DM_{95} | — | February 4, 2009 | Mount Lemmon | Mount Lemmon Survey | · | 1.6 km | MPC · JPL |
| 400629 | 2009 DO_{106} | — | January 31, 2009 | Mount Lemmon | Mount Lemmon Survey | · | 1.9 km | MPC · JPL |
| 400630 | 2009 DO_{118} | — | February 27, 2009 | Kitt Peak | Spacewatch | · | 2.0 km | MPC · JPL |
| 400631 | 2009 DR_{125} | — | February 19, 2009 | Kitt Peak | Spacewatch | · | 1.3 km | MPC · JPL |
| 400632 | 2009 DZ_{129} | — | February 27, 2009 | Kitt Peak | Spacewatch | · | 1.7 km | MPC · JPL |
| 400633 | 2009 DD_{131} | — | February 25, 2009 | Črni Vrh | Skvarč, J. | · | 1.3 km | MPC · JPL |
| 400634 | 2009 DM_{132} | — | January 27, 2009 | XuYi | PMO NEO Survey Program | · | 1.8 km | MPC · JPL |
| 400635 | 2009 DT_{136} | — | February 24, 2009 | Catalina | CSS | · | 1.7 km | MPC · JPL |
| 400636 | 2009 ES_{2} | — | March 5, 2009 | Cerro Burek | Burek, Cerro | EUN | 1.3 km | MPC · JPL |
| 400637 | 2009 EF_{12} | — | March 1, 2009 | Kitt Peak | Spacewatch | · | 2.8 km | MPC · JPL |
| 400638 | 2009 EL_{12} | — | March 1, 2009 | Mount Lemmon | Mount Lemmon Survey | KON | 2.7 km | MPC · JPL |
| 400639 | 2009 EY_{17} | — | January 31, 2009 | Mount Lemmon | Mount Lemmon Survey | · | 1.7 km | MPC · JPL |
| 400640 | 2009 EJ_{20} | — | March 15, 2009 | La Sagra | OAM | · | 1.9 km | MPC · JPL |
| 400641 | 2009 FC_{23} | — | February 20, 2009 | Kitt Peak | Spacewatch | · | 1.5 km | MPC · JPL |
| 400642 | 2009 FF_{23} | — | January 31, 2009 | Mount Lemmon | Mount Lemmon Survey | · | 1.8 km | MPC · JPL |
| 400643 | 2009 FG_{27} | — | March 19, 2009 | Catalina | CSS | EUN | 1.3 km | MPC · JPL |
| 400644 | 2009 FA_{50} | — | March 2, 2009 | Mount Lemmon | Mount Lemmon Survey | · | 1.7 km | MPC · JPL |
| 400645 | 2009 FC_{54} | — | March 29, 2009 | Mount Lemmon | Mount Lemmon Survey | · | 2.1 km | MPC · JPL |
| 400646 | 2009 FE_{63} | — | March 28, 2009 | Kitt Peak | Spacewatch | · | 1.2 km | MPC · JPL |
| 400647 | 2009 FC_{68} | — | March 21, 2009 | Mount Lemmon | Mount Lemmon Survey | · | 1.7 km | MPC · JPL |
| 400648 | 2009 FM_{68} | — | February 19, 2009 | Kitt Peak | Spacewatch | · | 1.0 km | MPC · JPL |
| 400649 | 2009 FV_{72} | — | March 19, 2009 | Kitt Peak | Spacewatch | · | 2.0 km | MPC · JPL |
| 400650 | 2009 HW_{16} | — | April 18, 2009 | Kitt Peak | Spacewatch | JUN | 870 m | MPC · JPL |
| 400651 | 2009 HT_{18} | — | April 19, 2009 | Kitt Peak | Spacewatch | · | 1.9 km | MPC · JPL |
| 400652 | 2009 HZ_{24} | — | April 17, 2009 | Kitt Peak | Spacewatch | · | 2.0 km | MPC · JPL |
| 400653 | 2009 HU_{25} | — | March 31, 2009 | Kitt Peak | Spacewatch | · | 1.8 km | MPC · JPL |
| 400654 | 2009 HZ_{29} | — | April 19, 2009 | Kitt Peak | Spacewatch | · | 1.8 km | MPC · JPL |
| 400655 | 2009 HM_{38} | — | March 26, 2009 | Mount Lemmon | Mount Lemmon Survey | · | 2.2 km | MPC · JPL |
| 400656 | 2009 HG_{40} | — | September 14, 2006 | Kitt Peak | Spacewatch | · | 1.9 km | MPC · JPL |
| 400657 | 2009 HL_{49} | — | April 20, 2009 | Kitt Peak | Spacewatch | · | 1.8 km | MPC · JPL |
| 400658 | 2009 HC_{55} | — | March 31, 2009 | Kitt Peak | Spacewatch | · | 1.7 km | MPC · JPL |
| 400659 | 2009 HO_{73} | — | February 25, 2009 | Siding Spring | SSS | · | 2.4 km | MPC · JPL |
| 400660 | 2009 HP_{83} | — | April 23, 2009 | Kitt Peak | Spacewatch | · | 1.8 km | MPC · JPL |
| 400661 | 2009 HQ_{88} | — | April 30, 2009 | La Sagra | OAM | · | 2.1 km | MPC · JPL |
| 400662 | 2009 HN_{94} | — | October 27, 2006 | Mount Lemmon | Mount Lemmon Survey | · | 1.6 km | MPC · JPL |
| 400663 | 2009 HB_{96} | — | April 20, 2009 | Kitt Peak | Spacewatch | · | 1.6 km | MPC · JPL |
| 400664 | 2009 HV_{99} | — | April 22, 2009 | Mount Lemmon | Mount Lemmon Survey | · | 2.4 km | MPC · JPL |
| 400665 | 2009 HW_{100} | — | September 18, 2006 | Kitt Peak | Spacewatch | · | 1.6 km | MPC · JPL |
| 400666 | 2009 HH_{104} | — | April 23, 2009 | Kitt Peak | Spacewatch | · | 1.9 km | MPC · JPL |
| 400667 | 2009 JS_{2} | — | March 30, 2009 | Mount Lemmon | Mount Lemmon Survey | EUN | 1.4 km | MPC · JPL |
| 400668 | 2009 KG_{20} | — | May 29, 2009 | Mount Lemmon | Mount Lemmon Survey | H | 500 m | MPC · JPL |
| 400669 | 2009 LO_{1} | — | June 12, 2009 | Catalina | CSS | · | 2.2 km | MPC · JPL |
| 400670 | 2009 MD_{8} | — | June 27, 2009 | La Sagra | OAM | H | 700 m | MPC · JPL |
| 400671 | 2009 MR_{9} | — | June 28, 2009 | Haleakala | Pan-STARRS 1 | · | 2.0 km | MPC · JPL |
| 400672 | 2009 OO_{3} | — | May 28, 2009 | Kitt Peak | Spacewatch | · | 2.9 km | MPC · JPL |
| 400673 Vitapolunina | 2009 OL_{5} | Vitapolunina | July 24, 2009 | Zelenchukskaya Stn103972 | T. V. Krjačko | · | 2.2 km | MPC · JPL |
| 400674 | 2009 OA_{15} | — | July 30, 2009 | Tzec Maun | Tozzi, F. | · | 3.8 km | MPC · JPL |
| 400675 | 2009 OS_{19} | — | July 29, 2009 | Cerro Burek | Burek, Cerro | · | 3.6 km | MPC · JPL |
| 400676 | 2009 OA_{25} | — | July 27, 2009 | Catalina | CSS | THB | 3.4 km | MPC · JPL |
| 400677 | 2009 PF | — | August 2, 2009 | La Sagra | OAM | · | 3.2 km | MPC · JPL |
| 400678 | 2009 PG_{5} | — | August 15, 2009 | La Sagra | OAM | · | 3.8 km | MPC · JPL |
| 400679 | 2009 PZ_{7} | — | July 29, 2009 | Kitt Peak | Spacewatch | · | 3.6 km | MPC · JPL |
| 400680 | 2009 PL_{9} | — | August 15, 2009 | Kitt Peak | Spacewatch | H | 630 m | MPC · JPL |
| 400681 | 2009 PE_{12} | — | August 15, 2009 | Catalina | CSS | · | 3.5 km | MPC · JPL |
| 400682 | 2009 PX_{15} | — | August 15, 2009 | Kitt Peak | Spacewatch | · | 3.1 km | MPC · JPL |
| 400683 | 2009 PK_{20} | — | August 15, 2009 | Kitt Peak | Spacewatch | · | 2.5 km | MPC · JPL |
| 400684 | 2009 QN_{4} | — | August 17, 2009 | Catalina | CSS | · | 2.1 km | MPC · JPL |
| 400685 | 2009 QN_{15} | — | August 16, 2009 | Kitt Peak | Spacewatch | · | 2.9 km | MPC · JPL |
| 400686 | 2009 QR_{30} | — | August 21, 2009 | Socorro | LINEAR | · | 3.9 km | MPC · JPL |
| 400687 | 2009 QB_{32} | — | August 17, 2009 | Kitt Peak | Spacewatch | EOS | 2.7 km | MPC · JPL |
| 400688 | 2009 QS_{34} | — | August 28, 2009 | La Sagra | OAM | · | 4.4 km | MPC · JPL |
| 400689 | 2009 QD_{37} | — | August 31, 2009 | La Sagra | OAM | EUP | 4.4 km | MPC · JPL |
| 400690 | 2009 QM_{43} | — | August 27, 2009 | La Sagra | OAM | · | 2.1 km | MPC · JPL |
| 400691 | 2009 QV_{48} | — | August 27, 2009 | Catalina | CSS | · | 2.9 km | MPC · JPL |
| 400692 | 2009 QW_{55} | — | August 27, 2009 | Kitt Peak | Spacewatch | · | 2.0 km | MPC · JPL |
| 400693 | 2009 QC_{58} | — | August 17, 2009 | Kitt Peak | Spacewatch | · | 3.1 km | MPC · JPL |
| 400694 | 2009 QX_{58} | — | August 17, 2009 | Bergisch Gladbach | W. Bickel | TIR | 2.7 km | MPC · JPL |
| 400695 | 2009 QO_{59} | — | August 21, 2009 | Socorro | LINEAR | TIR | 3.0 km | MPC · JPL |
| 400696 | 2009 QH_{63} | — | September 26, 2009 | La Sagra | OAM | · | 3.6 km | MPC · JPL |
| 400697 | 2009 RV_{4} | — | September 15, 2009 | Tzec Maun | L. Elenin | · | 3.3 km | MPC · JPL |
| 400698 | 2009 RG_{7} | — | September 10, 2009 | Catalina | CSS | · | 3.5 km | MPC · JPL |
| 400699 | 2009 RB_{8} | — | September 12, 2009 | Kitt Peak | Spacewatch | · | 2.9 km | MPC · JPL |
| 400700 | 2009 RJ_{10} | — | September 12, 2009 | Kitt Peak | Spacewatch | THM | 2.0 km | MPC · JPL |

== 400701–400800 ==
back to top

| Designation | | | Discovery | | | Properties | | Ref |
| Permanent | Provisional | Named after | Date | Site | Discoverer(s) | Category | Diam. | Ref |
|---|---|---|---|---|---|---|---|---|
| 400701 | 2009 RN_{14} | — | September 12, 2009 | Kitt Peak | Spacewatch | · | 3.2 km | MPC · JPL |
| 400702 | 2009 RY_{14} | — | September 12, 2009 | Kitt Peak | Spacewatch | · | 3.2 km | MPC · JPL |
| 400703 | 2009 RM_{17} | — | September 12, 2009 | Kitt Peak | Spacewatch | · | 3.1 km | MPC · JPL |
| 400704 | 2009 RO_{32} | — | September 14, 2009 | Catalina | CSS | · | 4.3 km | MPC · JPL |
| 400705 | 2009 RR_{32} | — | September 14, 2009 | Catalina | CSS | · | 3.7 km | MPC · JPL |
| 400706 | 2009 RB_{34} | — | September 14, 2009 | Kitt Peak | Spacewatch | · | 2.9 km | MPC · JPL |
| 400707 | 2009 RC_{39} | — | September 15, 2009 | Kitt Peak | Spacewatch | EOS | 2.4 km | MPC · JPL |
| 400708 | 2009 RY_{52} | — | September 15, 2009 | Kitt Peak | Spacewatch | THM | 2.6 km | MPC · JPL |
| 400709 | 2009 RE_{64} | — | June 21, 2009 | Mount Lemmon | Mount Lemmon Survey | · | 4.7 km | MPC · JPL |
| 400710 | 2009 RE_{71} | — | September 15, 2009 | Kitt Peak | Spacewatch | THM | 2.3 km | MPC · JPL |
| 400711 | 2009 RV_{72} | — | September 15, 2009 | Catalina | CSS | T_{j} (2.99) | 4.2 km | MPC · JPL |
| 400712 | 2009 SU_{1} | — | September 17, 2009 | Bisei SG Center | BATTeRS | · | 2.7 km | MPC · JPL |
| 400713 | 2009 SX_{2} | — | September 16, 2009 | Kitt Peak | Spacewatch | · | 3.1 km | MPC · JPL |
| 400714 | 2009 SG_{10} | — | October 14, 1998 | Kitt Peak | Spacewatch | VER | 3.1 km | MPC · JPL |
| 400715 | 2009 SM_{15} | — | August 15, 2009 | Kitt Peak | Spacewatch | · | 2.0 km | MPC · JPL |
| 400716 | 2009 SE_{16} | — | September 20, 2009 | Catalina | CSS | · | 6.3 km | MPC · JPL |
| 400717 | 2009 SN_{53} | — | September 17, 2009 | Catalina | CSS | · | 3.1 km | MPC · JPL |
| 400718 | 2009 SZ_{62} | — | September 17, 2009 | Mount Lemmon | Mount Lemmon Survey | · | 3.0 km | MPC · JPL |
| 400719 | 2009 SD_{63} | — | September 17, 2009 | Mount Lemmon | Mount Lemmon Survey | · | 1.6 km | MPC · JPL |
| 400720 | 2009 SV_{80} | — | August 27, 2009 | Kitt Peak | Spacewatch | EOS | 2.0 km | MPC · JPL |
| 400721 | 2009 SJ_{89} | — | November 17, 2004 | Campo Imperatore | CINEOS | · | 2.9 km | MPC · JPL |
| 400722 | 2009 SY_{96} | — | November 20, 2004 | Campo Imperatore | CINEOS | VER | 3.7 km | MPC · JPL |
| 400723 | 2009 SF_{106} | — | September 16, 2009 | Mount Lemmon | Mount Lemmon Survey | · | 3.8 km | MPC · JPL |
| 400724 | 2009 SU_{155} | — | September 12, 2009 | Kitt Peak | Spacewatch | THM | 2.4 km | MPC · JPL |
| 400725 | 2009 SZ_{164} | — | September 21, 2009 | Mount Lemmon | Mount Lemmon Survey | · | 3.2 km | MPC · JPL |
| 400726 | 2009 SD_{172} | — | September 28, 2009 | Nogales | Tenagra II | T_{j} (2.98) | 5.4 km | MPC · JPL |
| 400727 | 2009 SP_{179} | — | August 29, 2009 | Kitt Peak | Spacewatch | · | 3.3 km | MPC · JPL |
| 400728 | 2009 SZ_{205} | — | September 22, 2009 | Kitt Peak | Spacewatch | THM | 2.2 km | MPC · JPL |
| 400729 | 2009 SJ_{229} | — | September 29, 2009 | Tzec Maun | Tozzi, F. | · | 4.0 km | MPC · JPL |
| 400730 | 2009 SG_{268} | — | September 24, 2009 | Kitt Peak | Spacewatch | · | 2.2 km | MPC · JPL |
| 400731 | 2009 SO_{306} | — | August 18, 2009 | Kitt Peak | Spacewatch | · | 2.9 km | MPC · JPL |
| 400732 | 2009 SZ_{331} | — | September 20, 2009 | Mount Lemmon | Mount Lemmon Survey | · | 3.2 km | MPC · JPL |
| 400733 | 2009 SK_{344} | — | September 18, 2009 | Catalina | CSS | TIR · | 4.0 km | MPC · JPL |
| 400734 | 2009 SL_{344} | — | September 18, 2009 | Catalina | CSS | · | 3.1 km | MPC · JPL |
| 400735 | 2009 SD_{347} | — | September 27, 2009 | Catalina | CSS | · | 2.5 km | MPC · JPL |
| 400736 | 2009 SX_{358} | — | September 19, 2009 | Moletai | K. Černis, Zdanavicius, J. | · | 2.3 km | MPC · JPL |
| 400737 | 2009 TH_{45} | — | October 15, 2009 | Catalina | CSS | · | 3.4 km | MPC · JPL |
| 400738 | 2009 TP_{45} | — | October 15, 2009 | Catalina | CSS | · | 3.9 km | MPC · JPL |
| 400739 | 2009 UK_{3} | — | October 18, 2009 | Nazaret | Muler, G. | · | 2.9 km | MPC · JPL |
| 400740 | 2009 UY_{37} | — | October 22, 2009 | Mount Lemmon | Mount Lemmon Survey | · | 4.0 km | MPC · JPL |
| 400741 | 2009 UP_{61} | — | February 24, 2006 | Kitt Peak | Spacewatch | · | 3.2 km | MPC · JPL |
| 400742 | 2009 UX_{90} | — | October 16, 2009 | Catalina | CSS | · | 4.1 km | MPC · JPL |
| 400743 | 2009 UZ_{121} | — | October 26, 2009 | Catalina | CSS | EMA | 4.0 km | MPC · JPL |
| 400744 | 2009 UL_{128} | — | October 27, 2009 | La Sagra | OAM | · | 4.3 km | MPC · JPL |
| 400745 | 2009 UV_{130} | — | October 26, 2009 | Mount Lemmon | Mount Lemmon Survey | · | 3.6 km | MPC · JPL |
| 400746 | 2009 UG_{139} | — | October 27, 2009 | Mount Lemmon | Mount Lemmon Survey | · | 4.6 km | MPC · JPL |
| 400747 | 2009 UK_{151} | — | October 17, 2009 | Catalina | CSS | · | 3.9 km | MPC · JPL |
| 400748 | 2009 UP_{153} | — | October 25, 2009 | Kitt Peak | Spacewatch | LIX | 3.3 km | MPC · JPL |
| 400749 | 2009 VY_{26} | — | November 8, 2009 | Kitt Peak | Spacewatch | · | 2.5 km | MPC · JPL |
| 400750 | 2009 VR_{63} | — | November 8, 2009 | Kitt Peak | Spacewatch | CYB | 4.0 km | MPC · JPL |
| 400751 | 2009 VS_{106} | — | November 10, 2009 | Catalina | CSS | · | 3.3 km | MPC · JPL |
| 400752 | 2009 WE_{218} | — | September 28, 2009 | Kitt Peak | Spacewatch | VER | 2.2 km | MPC · JPL |
| 400753 | 2009 WR_{259} | — | November 27, 2009 | Mount Lemmon | Mount Lemmon Survey | T_{j} (2.98) · EUP | 4.6 km | MPC · JPL |
| 400754 | 2009 WN_{263} | — | November 19, 2009 | Mount Lemmon | Mount Lemmon Survey | ERI | 1.6 km | MPC · JPL |
| 400755 | 2009 YF_{16} | — | December 19, 2009 | Mount Lemmon | Mount Lemmon Survey | · | 1.2 km | MPC · JPL |
| 400756 | 2010 AR_{121} | — | September 25, 2009 | Catalina | CSS | (1118) | 7.1 km | MPC · JPL |
| 400757 | 2010 BK_{96} | — | January 27, 2010 | WISE | WISE | · | 3.3 km | MPC · JPL |
| 400758 | 2010 CW_{4} | — | February 8, 2010 | Kitt Peak | Spacewatch | NYS | 950 m | MPC · JPL |
| 400759 | 2010 CG_{43} | — | February 13, 2010 | Mount Lemmon | Mount Lemmon Survey | · | 860 m | MPC · JPL |
| 400760 | 2010 CD_{70} | — | January 8, 2010 | Kitt Peak | Spacewatch | · | 890 m | MPC · JPL |
| 400761 | 2010 CV_{76} | — | February 13, 2010 | Kitt Peak | Spacewatch | NYS | 970 m | MPC · JPL |
| 400762 | 2010 CH_{89} | — | February 14, 2010 | Mount Lemmon | Mount Lemmon Survey | · | 910 m | MPC · JPL |
| 400763 | 2010 CH_{104} | — | February 14, 2010 | Kitt Peak | Spacewatch | · | 780 m | MPC · JPL |
| 400764 | 2010 CH_{114} | — | March 12, 2003 | Kitt Peak | Spacewatch | NYS | 1.8 km | MPC · JPL |
| 400765 | 2010 CS_{115} | — | February 14, 2010 | Mount Lemmon | Mount Lemmon Survey | · | 660 m | MPC · JPL |
| 400766 | 2010 CO_{117} | — | February 15, 2010 | Kitt Peak | Spacewatch | · | 3.9 km | MPC · JPL |
| 400767 | 2010 CC_{148} | — | February 13, 2010 | Mount Lemmon | Mount Lemmon Survey | · | 710 m | MPC · JPL |
| 400768 | 2010 CV_{152} | — | February 14, 2010 | Kitt Peak | Spacewatch | · | 820 m | MPC · JPL |
| 400769 | 2010 DK_{3} | — | February 16, 2010 | Kitt Peak | Spacewatch | NYS | 740 m | MPC · JPL |
| 400770 | 2010 DZ_{8} | — | February 16, 2010 | Kitt Peak | Spacewatch | · | 1.1 km | MPC · JPL |
| 400771 | 2010 DC_{16} | — | February 17, 2010 | WISE | WISE | · | 2.4 km | MPC · JPL |
| 400772 | 2010 DF_{49} | — | February 16, 2010 | Kitt Peak | Spacewatch | H | 680 m | MPC · JPL |
| 400773 | 2010 DH_{52} | — | February 21, 2010 | WISE | WISE | · | 2.2 km | MPC · JPL |
| 400774 | 2010 EG_{14} | — | March 5, 2010 | WISE | WISE | · | 2.6 km | MPC · JPL |
| 400775 | 2010 EK_{21} | — | March 9, 2010 | Taunus | E. Schwab, R. Kling | NYS | 980 m | MPC · JPL |
| 400776 | 2010 EQ_{31} | — | March 4, 2010 | Kitt Peak | Spacewatch | · | 720 m | MPC · JPL |
| 400777 | 2010 EF_{32} | — | March 4, 2010 | Kitt Peak | Spacewatch | · | 980 m | MPC · JPL |
| 400778 | 2010 EO_{42} | — | April 5, 2000 | Socorro | LINEAR | · | 780 m | MPC · JPL |
| 400779 | 2010 EQ_{70} | — | March 12, 2010 | Kitt Peak | Spacewatch | · | 1.8 km | MPC · JPL |
| 400780 | 2010 ER_{73} | — | March 13, 2010 | Mount Lemmon | Mount Lemmon Survey | V | 760 m | MPC · JPL |
| 400781 | 2010 EF_{85} | — | March 13, 2010 | Kitt Peak | Spacewatch | · | 1.4 km | MPC · JPL |
| 400782 | 2010 ES_{99} | — | March 14, 2010 | Kitt Peak | Spacewatch | · | 1.6 km | MPC · JPL |
| 400783 | 2010 EZ_{108} | — | March 14, 2010 | Kitt Peak | Spacewatch | NYS | 1.5 km | MPC · JPL |
| 400784 | 2010 EC_{125} | — | March 12, 2010 | Catalina | CSS | · | 1.1 km | MPC · JPL |
| 400785 | 2010 EY_{128} | — | March 12, 2010 | Kitt Peak | Spacewatch | · | 900 m | MPC · JPL |
| 400786 | 2010 ES_{133} | — | January 5, 2006 | Mount Lemmon | Mount Lemmon Survey | · | 910 m | MPC · JPL |
| 400787 | 2010 EA_{134} | — | March 5, 2010 | Kitt Peak | Spacewatch | NYS | 1.2 km | MPC · JPL |
| 400788 | 2010 EO_{134} | — | August 10, 2007 | Kitt Peak | Spacewatch | · | 980 m | MPC · JPL |
| 400789 | 2010 EK_{135} | — | March 13, 2010 | Kitt Peak | Spacewatch | V | 620 m | MPC · JPL |
| 400790 | 2010 EQ_{135} | — | March 13, 2010 | Kitt Peak | Spacewatch | · | 900 m | MPC · JPL |
| 400791 | 2010 ER_{136} | — | March 12, 2010 | Kitt Peak | Spacewatch | NYS | 880 m | MPC · JPL |
| 400792 | 2010 FS_{6} | — | March 15, 2010 | Mount Lemmon | Mount Lemmon Survey | · | 770 m | MPC · JPL |
| 400793 | 2010 FF_{16} | — | September 26, 2008 | Kitt Peak | Spacewatch | · | 670 m | MPC · JPL |
| 400794 | 2010 FZ_{24} | — | December 26, 2005 | Kitt Peak | Spacewatch | · | 880 m | MPC · JPL |
| 400795 | 2010 FN_{57} | — | March 20, 2010 | Kitt Peak | Spacewatch | · | 1.0 km | MPC · JPL |
| 400796 Douglass | 2010 FQ_{77} | Douglass | March 31, 2010 | WISE | WISE | · | 3.2 km | MPC · JPL |
| 400797 | 2010 FP_{87} | — | March 21, 2010 | Kitt Peak | Spacewatch | NYS | 1.0 km | MPC · JPL |
| 400798 | 2010 FQ_{92} | — | February 14, 2010 | Catalina | CSS | · | 1.5 km | MPC · JPL |
| 400799 | 2010 GW_{15} | — | April 3, 2010 | WISE | WISE | · | 2.8 km | MPC · JPL |
| 400800 | 2010 GT_{28} | — | April 7, 2010 | La Sagra | OAM | · | 1.3 km | MPC · JPL |

== 400801–400900 ==
back to top

| Designation | | | Discovery | | | Properties | | Ref |
| Permanent | Provisional | Named after | Date | Site | Discoverer(s) | Category | Diam. | Ref |
|---|---|---|---|---|---|---|---|---|
| 400801 | 2010 GJ_{66} | — | April 7, 2010 | Catalina | CSS | · | 1.3 km | MPC · JPL |
| 400802 | 2010 GM_{97} | — | April 7, 2010 | Kitt Peak | Spacewatch | · | 740 m | MPC · JPL |
| 400803 | 2010 GB_{98} | — | April 10, 2010 | Kitt Peak | Spacewatch | · | 730 m | MPC · JPL |
| 400804 | 2010 GD_{108} | — | February 2, 2006 | Mount Lemmon | Mount Lemmon Survey | · | 1 km | MPC · JPL |
| 400805 | 2010 GD_{110} | — | April 9, 2010 | Kitt Peak | Spacewatch | · | 1.5 km | MPC · JPL |
| 400806 | 2010 GC_{115} | — | April 10, 2010 | Mount Lemmon | Mount Lemmon Survey | · | 720 m | MPC · JPL |
| 400807 | 2010 GN_{115} | — | April 9, 2003 | Kitt Peak | Spacewatch | · | 950 m | MPC · JPL |
| 400808 | 2010 GB_{136} | — | May 4, 2006 | Mount Lemmon | Mount Lemmon Survey | · | 1.5 km | MPC · JPL |
| 400809 | 2010 GL_{143} | — | April 10, 2010 | Mount Lemmon | Mount Lemmon Survey | · | 2.3 km | MPC · JPL |
| 400810 | 2010 GV_{143} | — | April 10, 2010 | Mount Lemmon | Mount Lemmon Survey | · | 2.0 km | MPC · JPL |
| 400811 Gillesfontaine | 2010 GF_{153} | Gillesfontaine | April 15, 2010 | WISE | WISE | · | 2.1 km | MPC · JPL |
| 400812 | 2010 GH_{160} | — | November 7, 2008 | Mount Lemmon | Mount Lemmon Survey | PHO | 1.2 km | MPC · JPL |
| 400813 | 2010 GX_{161} | — | February 27, 2006 | Kitt Peak | Spacewatch | · | 1.1 km | MPC · JPL |
| 400814 | 2010 HP_{77} | — | April 20, 2010 | Kitt Peak | Spacewatch | · | 1.1 km | MPC · JPL |
| 400815 | 2010 HU_{79} | — | April 20, 2010 | Kitt Peak | Spacewatch | · | 990 m | MPC · JPL |
| 400816 | 2010 HQ_{101} | — | April 30, 2010 | WISE | WISE | · | 2.0 km | MPC · JPL |
| 400817 | 2010 HO_{108} | — | March 6, 2006 | Mount Lemmon | Mount Lemmon Survey | MAS | 670 m | MPC · JPL |
| 400818 | 2010 JV_{29} | — | May 3, 2010 | Kitt Peak | Spacewatch | · | 1.4 km | MPC · JPL |
| 400819 | 2010 JQ_{33} | — | April 9, 2010 | Kitt Peak | Spacewatch | · | 1.1 km | MPC · JPL |
| 400820 | 2010 JS_{40} | — | April 7, 2010 | Kitt Peak | Spacewatch | · | 1.7 km | MPC · JPL |
| 400821 | 2010 JU_{40} | — | February 4, 1995 | Kitt Peak | Spacewatch | MAS | 770 m | MPC · JPL |
| 400822 | 2010 JD_{85} | — | May 7, 2010 | Mount Lemmon | Mount Lemmon Survey | · | 1.7 km | MPC · JPL |
| 400823 | 2010 JN_{85} | — | March 24, 2006 | Kitt Peak | Spacewatch | · | 1.3 km | MPC · JPL |
| 400824 | 2010 JM_{109} | — | May 12, 2010 | WISE | WISE | · | 1.8 km | MPC · JPL |
| 400825 | 2010 JP_{110} | — | May 7, 2010 | Mount Lemmon | Mount Lemmon Survey | · | 1.8 km | MPC · JPL |
| 400826 | 2010 JU_{153} | — | May 12, 2010 | Mount Lemmon | Mount Lemmon Survey | · | 1.3 km | MPC · JPL |
| 400827 | 2010 JJ_{157} | — | March 31, 2003 | Kitt Peak | Spacewatch | V | 670 m | MPC · JPL |
| 400828 | 2010 JV_{167} | — | May 11, 2010 | Mount Lemmon | Mount Lemmon Survey | · | 1.5 km | MPC · JPL |
| 400829 | 2010 KB_{32} | — | May 19, 2010 | WISE | WISE | · | 2.3 km | MPC · JPL |
| 400830 | 2010 KU_{36} | — | September 9, 2007 | Kitt Peak | Spacewatch | · | 1.2 km | MPC · JPL |
| 400831 | 2010 KT_{78} | — | May 25, 2010 | WISE | WISE | NAE | 4.2 km | MPC · JPL |
| 400832 | 2010 KT_{79} | — | May 25, 2010 | WISE | WISE | · | 2.9 km | MPC · JPL |
| 400833 | 2010 KR_{103} | — | May 29, 2010 | WISE | WISE | JUN | 1.2 km | MPC · JPL |
| 400834 | 2010 KO_{117} | — | May 19, 2010 | Catalina | CSS | ERI | 2.0 km | MPC · JPL |
| 400835 | 2010 KY_{120} | — | May 31, 2010 | WISE | WISE | · | 1.6 km | MPC · JPL |
| 400836 | 2010 LB_{38} | — | June 6, 2010 | WISE | WISE | · | 2.5 km | MPC · JPL |
| 400837 | 2010 LP_{41} | — | June 7, 2010 | WISE | WISE | · | 1.7 km | MPC · JPL |
| 400838 | 2010 LS_{51} | — | June 8, 2010 | WISE | WISE | · | 1.3 km | MPC · JPL |
| 400839 | 2010 LE_{60} | — | June 9, 2010 | WISE | WISE | · | 3.1 km | MPC · JPL |
| 400840 | 2010 LH_{67} | — | May 7, 2010 | Mount Lemmon | Mount Lemmon Survey | · | 1.4 km | MPC · JPL |
| 400841 | 2010 LN_{75} | — | June 10, 2010 | WISE | WISE | · | 2.4 km | MPC · JPL |
| 400842 | 2010 LJ_{82} | — | June 11, 2010 | WISE | WISE | · | 2.8 km | MPC · JPL |
| 400843 | 2010 LQ_{101} | — | June 13, 2010 | WISE | WISE | JUN | 1.4 km | MPC · JPL |
| 400844 | 2010 LE_{107} | — | February 27, 2006 | Kitt Peak | Spacewatch | · | 980 m | MPC · JPL |
| 400845 | 2010 LU_{129} | — | June 15, 2010 | WISE | WISE | · | 2.7 km | MPC · JPL |
| 400846 | 2010 MR_{2} | — | December 31, 2002 | Socorro | LINEAR | BAR | 1.7 km | MPC · JPL |
| 400847 | 2010 MH_{11} | — | June 17, 2010 | WISE | WISE | · | 1.2 km | MPC · JPL |
| 400848 | 2010 MB_{20} | — | June 18, 2010 | WISE | WISE | · | 1.7 km | MPC · JPL |
| 400849 | 2010 MS_{21} | — | June 18, 2010 | WISE | WISE | · | 2.3 km | MPC · JPL |
| 400850 | 2010 ML_{32} | — | October 2, 2006 | Mount Lemmon | Mount Lemmon Survey | · | 2.5 km | MPC · JPL |
| 400851 | 2010 MQ_{32} | — | October 22, 2006 | Kitt Peak | Spacewatch | · | 2.0 km | MPC · JPL |
| 400852 | 2010 MK_{38} | — | June 21, 2010 | WISE | WISE | EUN | 1.7 km | MPC · JPL |
| 400853 | 2010 MM_{102} | — | June 29, 2010 | WISE | WISE | · | 5.1 km | MPC · JPL |
| 400854 | 2010 MA_{105} | — | March 9, 2008 | Mount Lemmon | Mount Lemmon Survey | · | 2.5 km | MPC · JPL |
| 400855 | 2010 MN_{113} | — | June 21, 2010 | Mount Lemmon | Mount Lemmon Survey | NYS | 1.5 km | MPC · JPL |
| 400856 | 2010 MQ_{115} | — | June 30, 2010 | WISE | WISE | · | 1.6 km | MPC · JPL |
| 400857 | 2010 NJ_{36} | — | July 8, 2010 | WISE | WISE | · | 2.2 km | MPC · JPL |
| 400858 | 2010 NV_{53} | — | February 28, 2008 | Mount Lemmon | Mount Lemmon Survey | · | 2.5 km | MPC · JPL |
| 400859 | 2010 ND_{56} | — | November 21, 2001 | Socorro | LINEAR | HOF | 2.6 km | MPC · JPL |
| 400860 | 2010 NQ_{57} | — | July 10, 2010 | WISE | WISE | · | 2.3 km | MPC · JPL |
| 400861 | 2010 NA_{59} | — | July 10, 2010 | WISE | WISE | · | 2.5 km | MPC · JPL |
| 400862 | 2010 NC_{66} | — | July 6, 2010 | Kitt Peak | Spacewatch | critical | 840 m | MPC · JPL |
| 400863 | 2010 NY_{66} | — | November 4, 2007 | Mount Lemmon | Mount Lemmon Survey | · | 1.6 km | MPC · JPL |
| 400864 | 2010 NJ_{109} | — | October 25, 2005 | Kitt Peak | Spacewatch | · | 2.9 km | MPC · JPL |
| 400865 | 2010 OR_{12} | — | March 31, 2009 | Kitt Peak | Spacewatch | ADE | 2.3 km | MPC · JPL |
| 400866 | 2010 OD_{18} | — | July 18, 2010 | WISE | WISE | · | 3.6 km | MPC · JPL |
| 400867 | 2010 ON_{27} | — | September 14, 2005 | Kitt Peak | Spacewatch | HOF | 2.9 km | MPC · JPL |
| 400868 | 2010 OT_{30} | — | July 20, 2010 | WISE | WISE | · | 4.1 km | MPC · JPL |
| 400869 | 2010 OM_{36} | — | July 21, 2010 | WISE | WISE | · | 2.6 km | MPC · JPL |
| 400870 | 2010 OP_{40} | — | April 18, 2009 | Mount Lemmon | Mount Lemmon Survey | · | 1.1 km | MPC · JPL |
| 400871 | 2010 OC_{44} | — | July 21, 2010 | WISE | WISE | · | 2.0 km | MPC · JPL |
| 400872 | 2010 OG_{59} | — | July 7, 1997 | Kitt Peak | Spacewatch | · | 1.5 km | MPC · JPL |
| 400873 | 2010 OL_{82} | — | August 8, 2004 | Socorro | LINEAR | · | 3.7 km | MPC · JPL |
| 400874 | 2010 OD_{89} | — | July 27, 2010 | WISE | WISE | · | 2.7 km | MPC · JPL |
| 400875 | 2010 OF_{93} | — | July 27, 2010 | WISE | WISE | · | 2.3 km | MPC · JPL |
| 400876 | 2010 OA_{107} | — | July 29, 2010 | WISE | WISE | · | 2.5 km | MPC · JPL |
| 400877 | 2010 OT_{120} | — | July 31, 2010 | WISE | WISE | · | 4.4 km | MPC · JPL |
| 400878 | 2010 PC_{10} | — | August 4, 2010 | Socorro | LINEAR | · | 2.9 km | MPC · JPL |
| 400879 | 2010 PU_{21} | — | November 22, 2005 | Kitt Peak | Spacewatch | · | 5.2 km | MPC · JPL |
| 400880 | 2010 PW_{53} | — | August 8, 2010 | WISE | WISE | · | 2.3 km | MPC · JPL |
| 400881 Vladimírdolinay | 2010 PY_{56} | Vladimírdolinay | August 7, 2010 | Westfield | T. Vorobjov | · | 2.2 km | MPC · JPL |
| 400882 | 2010 PX_{75} | — | August 14, 2010 | Kitt Peak | Spacewatch | · | 1.1 km | MPC · JPL |
| 400883 | 2010 PF_{76} | — | August 11, 2010 | La Sagra | OAM | (5) | 1.3 km | MPC · JPL |
| 400884 | 2010 PK_{80} | — | April 7, 2008 | Kitt Peak | Spacewatch | EOS | 1.9 km | MPC · JPL |
| 400885 | 2010 QV_{4} | — | August 30, 2010 | La Sagra | OAM | · | 1.8 km | MPC · JPL |
| 400886 | 2010 QE_{5} | — | February 29, 2004 | Kitt Peak | Spacewatch | · | 2.3 km | MPC · JPL |
| 400887 | 2010 RQ_{5} | — | October 19, 2006 | Mount Lemmon | Mount Lemmon Survey | · | 1.6 km | MPC · JPL |
| 400888 | 2010 RD_{24} | — | September 3, 2010 | Mount Lemmon | Mount Lemmon Survey | · | 1.6 km | MPC · JPL |
| 400889 | 2010 RP_{39} | — | September 2, 2010 | Socorro | LINEAR | (1547) | 2.1 km | MPC · JPL |
| 400890 | 2010 RX_{39} | — | September 3, 2010 | Socorro | LINEAR | · | 1.7 km | MPC · JPL |
| 400891 | 2010 RT_{49} | — | May 8, 2005 | Kitt Peak | Spacewatch | · | 1.4 km | MPC · JPL |
| 400892 | 2010 RO_{50} | — | March 26, 2008 | Mount Lemmon | Mount Lemmon Survey | EOS | 1.7 km | MPC · JPL |
| 400893 | 2010 RF_{59} | — | September 5, 2010 | La Sagra | OAM | WIT | 1.1 km | MPC · JPL |
| 400894 | 2010 RP_{98} | — | September 30, 2006 | Mount Lemmon | Mount Lemmon Survey | · | 1.3 km | MPC · JPL |
| 400895 | 2010 RN_{102} | — | July 7, 2010 | WISE | WISE | HOF | 2.7 km | MPC · JPL |
| 400896 | 2010 RR_{113} | — | August 22, 2004 | Kitt Peak | Spacewatch | EOS | 2.0 km | MPC · JPL |
| 400897 | 2010 RF_{118} | — | February 13, 2008 | Kitt Peak | Spacewatch | · | 2.2 km | MPC · JPL |
| 400898 | 2010 RR_{120} | — | April 6, 2008 | Mount Lemmon | Mount Lemmon Survey | · | 2.6 km | MPC · JPL |
| 400899 | 2010 RB_{132} | — | April 22, 2009 | Mount Lemmon | Mount Lemmon Survey | · | 2.1 km | MPC · JPL |
| 400900 | 2010 RY_{141} | — | October 9, 2005 | Kitt Peak | Spacewatch | · | 1.7 km | MPC · JPL |

== 400901–401000 ==
back to top

| Designation | | | Discovery | | | Properties | | Ref |
| Permanent | Provisional | Named after | Date | Site | Discoverer(s) | Category | Diam. | Ref |
|---|---|---|---|---|---|---|---|---|
| 400901 | 2010 RM_{155} | — | February 22, 2007 | Kitt Peak | Spacewatch | · | 3.1 km | MPC · JPL |
| 400902 | 2010 RG_{162} | — | September 26, 2005 | Kitt Peak | Spacewatch | · | 2.2 km | MPC · JPL |
| 400903 | 2010 RB_{165} | — | September 9, 2010 | Kitt Peak | Spacewatch | · | 2.4 km | MPC · JPL |
| 400904 | 2010 RG_{176} | — | September 10, 2010 | Kitt Peak | Spacewatch | · | 1.7 km | MPC · JPL |
| 400905 | 2010 RC_{184} | — | February 9, 2007 | Mount Lemmon | Mount Lemmon Survey | · | 2.0 km | MPC · JPL |
| 400906 | 2010 SP_{5} | — | October 29, 2005 | Catalina | CSS | · | 2.8 km | MPC · JPL |
| 400907 | 2010 SB_{42} | — | September 11, 2001 | Socorro | LINEAR | · | 2.3 km | MPC · JPL |
| 400908 | 2010 TN_{18} | — | February 10, 2008 | Kitt Peak | Spacewatch | · | 1.9 km | MPC · JPL |
| 400909 | 2010 TY_{24} | — | April 6, 2008 | Mount Lemmon | Mount Lemmon Survey | · | 2.6 km | MPC · JPL |
| 400910 | 2010 TV_{46} | — | February 13, 2004 | Kitt Peak | Spacewatch | · | 1.8 km | MPC · JPL |
| 400911 | 2010 TH_{49} | — | October 2, 2010 | Kitt Peak | Spacewatch | · | 2.4 km | MPC · JPL |
| 400912 | 2010 TW_{88} | — | August 27, 2005 | Kitt Peak | Spacewatch | KOR | 1.6 km | MPC · JPL |
| 400913 | 2010 TS_{101} | — | August 30, 2005 | Kitt Peak | Spacewatch | KOR | 1.3 km | MPC · JPL |
| 400914 | 2010 TM_{104} | — | September 4, 2010 | Kitt Peak | Spacewatch | · | 2.2 km | MPC · JPL |
| 400915 | 2010 TW_{110} | — | October 9, 2010 | Catalina | CSS | · | 2.3 km | MPC · JPL |
| 400916 | 2010 TX_{115} | — | November 16, 2006 | Kitt Peak | Spacewatch | · | 1.4 km | MPC · JPL |
| 400917 | 2010 TD_{149} | — | March 28, 2008 | Mount Lemmon | Mount Lemmon Survey | EOS | 2.6 km | MPC · JPL |
| 400918 | 2010 TN_{149} | — | October 12, 2010 | Kitt Peak | Spacewatch | · | 2.4 km | MPC · JPL |
| 400919 | 2010 TC_{160} | — | April 28, 2008 | Mount Lemmon | Mount Lemmon Survey | · | 3.1 km | MPC · JPL |
| 400920 | 2010 TA_{166} | — | November 30, 2005 | Kitt Peak | Spacewatch | · | 2.8 km | MPC · JPL |
| 400921 | 2010 TB_{174} | — | June 6, 2005 | Kitt Peak | Spacewatch | · | 1.9 km | MPC · JPL |
| 400922 | 2010 TC_{181} | — | April 17, 2009 | Kitt Peak | Spacewatch | · | 1.8 km | MPC · JPL |
| 400923 | 2010 TR_{187} | — | August 8, 2004 | Socorro | LINEAR | · | 3.0 km | MPC · JPL |
| 400924 | 2010 UO_{3} | — | December 14, 2001 | Socorro | LINEAR | · | 2.0 km | MPC · JPL |
| 400925 | 2010 UU_{9} | — | September 18, 2004 | Socorro | LINEAR | · | 2.9 km | MPC · JPL |
| 400926 | 2010 UO_{25} | — | October 28, 2010 | Kitt Peak | Spacewatch | · | 3.0 km | MPC · JPL |
| 400927 | 2010 UD_{28} | — | September 5, 2010 | Mount Lemmon | Mount Lemmon Survey | · | 3.8 km | MPC · JPL |
| 400928 | 2010 UA_{43} | — | October 19, 2010 | Mount Lemmon | Mount Lemmon Survey | · | 1.9 km | MPC · JPL |
| 400929 | 2010 UB_{45} | — | November 11, 1996 | Kitt Peak | Spacewatch | · | 2.1 km | MPC · JPL |
| 400930 | 2010 UG_{58} | — | October 29, 2010 | Kitt Peak | Spacewatch | · | 4.1 km | MPC · JPL |
| 400931 | 2010 UV_{58} | — | October 29, 2010 | Kitt Peak | Spacewatch | · | 2.9 km | MPC · JPL |
| 400932 | 2010 UT_{78} | — | September 3, 2010 | Mount Lemmon | Mount Lemmon Survey | · | 4.2 km | MPC · JPL |
| 400933 | 2010 UZ_{92} | — | September 23, 2004 | Kitt Peak | Spacewatch | · | 2.9 km | MPC · JPL |
| 400934 | 2010 UP_{94} | — | June 26, 2010 | WISE | WISE | · | 4.6 km | MPC · JPL |
| 400935 | 2010 UE_{107} | — | October 8, 1999 | Socorro | LINEAR | · | 3.5 km | MPC · JPL |
| 400936 | 2010 VP_{5} | — | April 7, 2008 | Kitt Peak | Spacewatch | · | 2.3 km | MPC · JPL |
| 400937 | 2010 VH_{25} | — | October 14, 2010 | Mount Lemmon | Mount Lemmon Survey | · | 3.9 km | MPC · JPL |
| 400938 | 2010 VD_{29} | — | December 4, 2005 | Mount Lemmon | Mount Lemmon Survey | · | 2.1 km | MPC · JPL |
| 400939 | 2010 VH_{30} | — | January 27, 2007 | Mount Lemmon | Mount Lemmon Survey | · | 2.4 km | MPC · JPL |
| 400940 | 2010 VG_{31} | — | October 7, 1999 | Socorro | LINEAR | · | 3.0 km | MPC · JPL |
| 400941 | 2010 VD_{40} | — | December 21, 2005 | Kitt Peak | Spacewatch | · | 1.6 km | MPC · JPL |
| 400942 | 2010 VT_{45} | — | January 7, 2006 | Kitt Peak | Spacewatch | VER | 3.0 km | MPC · JPL |
| 400943 | 2010 VA_{47} | — | October 13, 2010 | Mount Lemmon | Mount Lemmon Survey | · | 3.2 km | MPC · JPL |
| 400944 | 2010 VF_{64} | — | November 6, 2010 | Mount Lemmon | Mount Lemmon Survey | · | 4.4 km | MPC · JPL |
| 400945 | 2010 VO_{65} | — | November 6, 2005 | Mount Lemmon | Mount Lemmon Survey | · | 2.1 km | MPC · JPL |
| 400946 | 2010 VJ_{83} | — | August 29, 2005 | Kitt Peak | Spacewatch | · | 2.1 km | MPC · JPL |
| 400947 | 2010 VT_{90} | — | December 4, 2005 | Kitt Peak | Spacewatch | · | 2.2 km | MPC · JPL |
| 400948 | 2010 VJ_{112} | — | October 30, 2010 | Kitt Peak | Spacewatch | EOS | 2.5 km | MPC · JPL |
| 400949 | 2010 VX_{114} | — | July 29, 2009 | Kitt Peak | Spacewatch | · | 3.6 km | MPC · JPL |
| 400950 | 2010 VU_{115} | — | October 13, 2010 | Mount Lemmon | Mount Lemmon Survey | EOS | 1.9 km | MPC · JPL |
| 400951 | 2010 VM_{118} | — | October 30, 2010 | Kitt Peak | Spacewatch | TIR | 3.5 km | MPC · JPL |
| 400952 | 2010 VO_{125} | — | January 27, 2007 | Mount Lemmon | Mount Lemmon Survey | KOR | 1.5 km | MPC · JPL |
| 400953 | 2010 VP_{125} | — | April 30, 2008 | Mount Lemmon | Mount Lemmon Survey | TEL | 1.6 km | MPC · JPL |
| 400954 | 2010 VH_{128} | — | August 12, 2010 | Kitt Peak | Spacewatch | · | 4.3 km | MPC · JPL |
| 400955 | 2010 VG_{142} | — | September 20, 1998 | Kitt Peak | Spacewatch | HYG | 2.8 km | MPC · JPL |
| 400956 | 2010 VH_{143} | — | February 17, 2007 | Kitt Peak | Spacewatch | · | 2.1 km | MPC · JPL |
| 400957 | 2010 VD_{169} | — | January 10, 2007 | Mount Lemmon | Mount Lemmon Survey | KOR | 1.4 km | MPC · JPL |
| 400958 | 2010 VQ_{181} | — | April 29, 2008 | Mount Lemmon | Mount Lemmon Survey | EOS | 1.8 km | MPC · JPL |
| 400959 | 2010 VG_{182} | — | September 11, 2010 | Mount Lemmon | Mount Lemmon Survey | · | 1.6 km | MPC · JPL |
| 400960 | 2010 VB_{201} | — | December 30, 2005 | Kitt Peak | Spacewatch | · | 3.1 km | MPC · JPL |
| 400961 | 2010 VC_{204} | — | August 9, 2004 | Socorro | LINEAR | · | 2.8 km | MPC · JPL |
| 400962 | 2010 VF_{213} | — | July 27, 2010 | WISE | WISE | DOR | 2.8 km | MPC · JPL |
| 400963 | 2010 VH_{216} | — | March 31, 2008 | Mount Lemmon | Mount Lemmon Survey | · | 2.4 km | MPC · JPL |
| 400964 | 2010 WZ_{2} | — | November 26, 2005 | Kitt Peak | Spacewatch | · | 2.0 km | MPC · JPL |
| 400965 | 2010 WA_{3} | — | September 18, 2010 | Mount Lemmon | Mount Lemmon Survey | · | 2.8 km | MPC · JPL |
| 400966 | 2010 WT_{4} | — | October 11, 2004 | Kitt Peak | Spacewatch | · | 2.9 km | MPC · JPL |
| 400967 | 2010 WD_{8} | — | September 17, 2004 | Anderson Mesa | LONEOS | · | 3.0 km | MPC · JPL |
| 400968 | 2010 WF_{8} | — | October 31, 2010 | Kitt Peak | Spacewatch | TIR | 3.4 km | MPC · JPL |
| 400969 | 2010 WS_{11} | — | November 16, 2010 | Mount Lemmon | Mount Lemmon Survey | · | 2.3 km | MPC · JPL |
| 400970 | 2010 WO_{12} | — | November 16, 2010 | Mount Lemmon | Mount Lemmon Survey | · | 2.3 km | MPC · JPL |
| 400971 | 2010 WG_{20} | — | October 4, 2004 | Kitt Peak | Spacewatch | · | 2.3 km | MPC · JPL |
| 400972 | 2010 XX_{17} | — | November 9, 2004 | Catalina | CSS | · | 3.3 km | MPC · JPL |
| 400973 | 2010 XK_{19} | — | January 7, 1994 | Kitt Peak | Spacewatch | EUP | 4.5 km | MPC · JPL |
| 400974 | 2010 XQ_{35} | — | April 30, 2008 | Mount Lemmon | Mount Lemmon Survey | · | 1.6 km | MPC · JPL |
| 400975 | 2010 XE_{36} | — | October 1, 2005 | Kitt Peak | Spacewatch | · | 3.3 km | MPC · JPL |
| 400976 | 2010 XE_{42} | — | August 17, 2009 | Catalina | CSS | · | 3.1 km | MPC · JPL |
| 400977 | 2010 XM_{42} | — | September 27, 2006 | Mount Lemmon | Mount Lemmon Survey | · | 2.0 km | MPC · JPL |
| 400978 | 2010 XH_{45} | — | March 19, 2007 | Mount Lemmon | Mount Lemmon Survey | · | 3.6 km | MPC · JPL |
| 400979 | 2010 XM_{53} | — | November 11, 2010 | Mount Lemmon | Mount Lemmon Survey | · | 1.7 km | MPC · JPL |
| 400980 | 2010 XJ_{56} | — | March 26, 2007 | Catalina | CSS | · | 600 m | MPC · JPL |
| 400981 | 2010 XT_{71} | — | November 11, 2004 | Kitt Peak | Spacewatch | · | 4.0 km | MPC · JPL |
| 400982 | 2010 XX_{76} | — | November 13, 2010 | Kitt Peak | Spacewatch | · | 3.3 km | MPC · JPL |
| 400983 | 2010 XK_{83} | — | January 5, 2000 | Kitt Peak | Spacewatch | · | 3.3 km | MPC · JPL |
| 400984 | 2010 XT_{86} | — | July 29, 2009 | Kitt Peak | Spacewatch | · | 2.5 km | MPC · JPL |
| 400985 | 2010 YA_{1} | — | October 1, 2005 | Mount Lemmon | Mount Lemmon Survey | · | 3.2 km | MPC · JPL |
| 400986 | 2011 AZ_{27} | — | December 10, 2004 | Catalina | CSS | EUP | 4.2 km | MPC · JPL |
| 400987 | 2011 AB_{40} | — | January 30, 2006 | Kitt Peak | Spacewatch | EOS | 2.2 km | MPC · JPL |
| 400988 | 2011 AX_{43} | — | December 8, 2010 | Mount Lemmon | Mount Lemmon Survey | · | 3.1 km | MPC · JPL |
| 400989 | 2011 BL_{22} | — | December 29, 2003 | Kitt Peak | Spacewatch | SYL · CYB | 3.6 km | MPC · JPL |
| 400990 | 2011 BB_{61} | — | December 15, 2004 | Socorro | LINEAR | · | 3.4 km | MPC · JPL |
| 400991 | 2011 CX_{24} | — | December 7, 2004 | Socorro | LINEAR | · | 3.7 km | MPC · JPL |
| 400992 | 2011 CJ_{42} | — | January 28, 2006 | Mount Lemmon | Mount Lemmon Survey | H | 600 m | MPC · JPL |
| 400993 | 2011 CZ_{117} | — | March 2, 2006 | Catalina | CSS | H | 580 m | MPC · JPL |
| 400994 | 2011 EC_{86} | — | January 13, 2008 | Mount Lemmon | Mount Lemmon Survey | H | 490 m | MPC · JPL |
| 400995 | 2011 GN_{41} | — | September 16, 2006 | Kitt Peak | Spacewatch | H | 560 m | MPC · JPL |
| 400996 | 2011 OO_{17} | — | June 27, 2011 | Kitt Peak | Spacewatch | PHO | 1.5 km | MPC · JPL |
| 400997 | 2011 QX_{9} | — | October 31, 2008 | Kitt Peak | Spacewatch | V | 470 m | MPC · JPL |
| 400998 | 2011 QE_{10} | — | August 9, 2004 | Anderson Mesa | LONEOS | · | 1.0 km | MPC · JPL |
| 400999 | 2011 QG_{11} | — | March 13, 2007 | Kitt Peak | Spacewatch | · | 730 m | MPC · JPL |
| 401000 | 2011 QV_{13} | — | September 8, 1977 | Palomar | C. J. van Houten, I. van Houten-Groeneveld, T. Gehrels | · | 580 m | MPC · JPL |

back to top

== Meaning of names ==
As minor planet discoveries are confirmed, they are given a permanent number by the IAU's Minor Planet Center (MPC), and the discoverers can then submit names for them, following the IAU's naming conventions. The list below concerns those minor planets in the specified number-range that have received names, and explains the meanings of those names.

Official naming citations of newly named small Solar System bodies are approved and published in a bulletin by IAU's Working Group for Small Bodies Nomenclature (WGSBN). Before May 2021, citations were published in MPC's Minor Planet Circulars for many decades. Recent citations can also be found on the JPL Small-Body Database (SBDB). Until his death in 2016, German astronomer Lutz D. Schmadel compiled these citations into the Dictionary of Minor Planet Names (DMP) and regularly updated the collection.

Based on Paul Herget's The Names of the Minor Planets, Schmadel also researched the unclear origin of numerous asteroids, most of which had been named prior to World War II. This article incorporates text from this source, which is in the public domain: SBDB New namings may only be added to this list below after official publication as the preannouncement of names is condemned. The WGSBN publishes a comprehensive guideline for the naming rules of non-cometary small Solar System bodies.

| Named minor planet | Provisional | This minor planet was named for... | Ref · Catalog |
|---|---|---|---|
| 400072 Radviliškis | 2006 SQ_{197} | Radviliskis, a city in Siauliai County, Lithuania. | IAU · 400072 |
| 400162 SAIT | 2006 VM_{85} | SAIT is the acronym of the Societa Astronomica Italiana (Italian Society of Astronomy). Founded in Palermo in 1871 under the name Italian Society of Spectroscopists, it was the first professional association specializing in “physical astronomy” and its Memorie (1872) is considered the world's first astrophysics journal. | IAU · 400162 |
| 400193 Castión | 2006 XW_{60} | The city of Castiglione dei Pepoli (also known as "Castión") is a medieval fiefdom of the Pepoli noble family, in the Bolognese Apennines, Italy. The second discoverer has lived there for many years. | JPL · 400193 |
| 400308 Antonkutter | 2007 TX_{184} | Anton Kutter (1903–1985), a German engineer, film director, screenwriter and amateur astronomer. | JPL · 400308 |
| 400309 Ralfhofner | 2007 TC_{185} | Ralf Hofner (1960–2014), a German amateur astronomer and founder of one of the biggest European Star Parties, located near Herzberg, Brandenburg. | JPL · 400309 |
| 400673 Vitapolunina | 2009 OL_{5} | Viktoriya (Vita) Polunina (born 1967), Professor Doctor of medical sciences, is a specialist in reflex therapy in children, reconstructive and sports medicine, therapeuticphysical training, and the author of more than 70 scientific papers. | JPL · 400673 |
| 400796 Douglass | 2010 FQ_{77} | Frederick Douglass (c. 1818–1895) was an American born into slavery who became a leading abolitionist and supporter of women's rights. Through his writings and speeches, he tirelessly fought slavery. He advised presidents, served in government, and pushed for equal protection of all under the law. | JPL · 400796 |
| 400811 Gillesfontaine | 2010 GF_{153} | Gilles Fontaine (1948–2019) was a Canadian astrophysicist at the Universite de Montreal. He made fundamental and lasting contributions to our knowledge of white dwarf interiors, evolution and pulsations. | JPL · 400811 |
| 400881 Vladimírdolinay | 2010 PY_{56} | Vladimír Dolinay (1981–2020) was a Slovak teacher, civic and local activist, promoter of education and an advocate for building bridges between Slovakia and Slovak minorities abroad, especially in Romania, where he worked as a teacher. He was also an enthusiastic supporter of the project to build a planetarium in Bratislava. | IAU · 400881 |
