= List of minor planets: 398001–399000 =

The following is a partial list of minor planets, running from minor-planet number 398001 through 399000, inclusive. The primary data for this and other partial lists is based on JPL's "Small-Body Orbital Elements" and data available from the Minor Planet Center. Critical list information is also provided by the MPC, unless otherwise specified from Lowell Observatory. A detailed description of the table's columns and additional sources are given on the main page including a complete list of every page in this series, and a statistical break-up on the dynamical classification of minor planets.

Also see the summary list of all named bodies in numerical and alphabetical order, and the corresponding naming citations for the number range of this particular list. New namings may only be added to this list after official publication, as the preannouncement of names is condemned by the Working Group for Small Bodies Nomenclature of the International Astronomical Union.

Near-Earth obj.	MBA (inner)	MBA (outer)	Centaur
Mars-crosser	MBA (middle)	Jupiter trojan	Trans-Neptunian obj.
Unclassified

== 398001–398100 ==
Designation			Discovery			Properties		Ref
Permanent	Provisional	Named after	Date	Site	Discoverer(s)	Category	Diam.	Ref
398001	2009 BZ_{176}	—	January 18, 2009	Kitt Peak	Spacewatch	·	1.4 km	MPC · JPL
398002	2009 BE_{179}	—	January 20, 2009	Catalina	CSS	·	1.9 km	MPC · JPL
398003	2009 BY_{182}	—	January 20, 2009	Mount Lemmon	Mount Lemmon Survey	MAR	1.3 km	MPC · JPL
398004	2009 BU_{183}	—	January 18, 2009	Catalina	CSS	·	2.0 km	MPC · JPL
398005	2009 BY_{185}	—	March 16, 2005	Catalina	CSS	·	1.9 km	MPC · JPL
398006	2009 BO_{187}	—	January 1, 2009	Mount Lemmon	Mount Lemmon Survey	RAF	980 m	MPC · JPL
398007	2009 BE_{188}	—	January 26, 2009	Socorro	LINEAR	·	2.1 km	MPC · JPL
398008	2009 BA_{190}	—	January 20, 2009	Catalina	CSS	GEF	1.5 km	MPC · JPL
398009	2009 CT_{6}	—	February 14, 2009	Dauban	Kugel, F.	(5)	1.4 km	MPC · JPL
398010	2009 CS_{13}	—	February 2, 2009	Moletai	K. Černis, Zdanavicius, J.	·	2.0 km	MPC · JPL
398011	2009 CU_{26}	—	February 1, 2009	Kitt Peak	Spacewatch	·	2.0 km	MPC · JPL
398012	2009 CC_{32}	—	February 1, 2009	Kitt Peak	Spacewatch	·	2.2 km	MPC · JPL
398013	2009 CL_{39}	—	February 13, 2009	Kitt Peak	Spacewatch	·	1.5 km	MPC · JPL
398014	2009 CN_{53}	—	February 1, 2009	Siding Spring	SSS	BAR	1.2 km	MPC · JPL
398015	2009 CB_{64}	—	February 2, 2009	Kitt Peak	Spacewatch	·	1.2 km	MPC · JPL
398016	2009 DR_{9}	—	February 18, 2009	Socorro	LINEAR	·	1.6 km	MPC · JPL
398017	2009 DG_{12}	—	December 1, 2008	Mount Lemmon	Mount Lemmon Survey	·	1.6 km	MPC · JPL
398018	2009 DD_{13}	—	February 16, 2009	Kitt Peak	Spacewatch	HNS	1.1 km	MPC · JPL
398019	2009 DM_{13}	—	February 16, 2009	Kitt Peak	Spacewatch	·	2.6 km	MPC · JPL
398020	2009 DV_{19}	—	February 21, 2009	Catalina	CSS	·	2.5 km	MPC · JPL
398021	2009 DD_{23}	—	February 19, 2009	Kitt Peak	Spacewatch	·	1.5 km	MPC · JPL
398022	2009 DN_{23}	—	February 19, 2009	Kitt Peak	Spacewatch	·	1.9 km	MPC · JPL
398023	2009 DX_{27}	—	January 18, 2009	Mount Lemmon	Mount Lemmon Survey	·	1.7 km	MPC · JPL
398024	2009 DO_{38}	—	February 1, 2009	Kitt Peak	Spacewatch	·	1.5 km	MPC · JPL
398025	2009 DF_{41}	—	January 16, 2009	Kitt Peak	Spacewatch	·	2.5 km	MPC · JPL
398026	2009 DH_{64}	—	November 7, 2007	Kitt Peak	Spacewatch	·	1.8 km	MPC · JPL
398027	2009 DQ_{89}	—	February 26, 2009	Kitt Peak	Spacewatch	HNS	1.2 km	MPC · JPL
398028	2009 DX_{90}	—	February 26, 2009	Mount Lemmon	Mount Lemmon Survey	·	1.5 km	MPC · JPL
398029	2009 DK_{99}	—	February 22, 2009	Kitt Peak	Spacewatch	·	1.9 km	MPC · JPL
398030	2009 DB_{100}	—	February 26, 2009	Kitt Peak	Spacewatch	ADE	1.9 km	MPC · JPL
398031	2009 DU_{104}	—	February 20, 2009	Kitt Peak	Spacewatch	·	1.6 km	MPC · JPL
398032	2009 DM_{110}	—	February 20, 2009	Catalina	CSS	·	1.9 km	MPC · JPL
398033	2009 DU_{115}	—	February 1, 2009	Kitt Peak	Spacewatch	·	1.6 km	MPC · JPL
398034	2009 DH_{128}	—	February 21, 2009	Kitt Peak	Spacewatch	·	1.1 km	MPC · JPL
398035	2009 DY_{128}	—	February 24, 2009	Mount Lemmon	Mount Lemmon Survey	·	3.7 km	MPC · JPL
398036	2009 DJ_{130}	—	February 28, 2009	Mount Lemmon	Mount Lemmon Survey	·	1.8 km	MPC · JPL
398037	2009 DN_{134}	—	February 27, 2009	Mount Lemmon	Mount Lemmon Survey	·	5.2 km	MPC · JPL
398038	2009 DD_{139}	—	October 2, 2006	Mount Lemmon	Mount Lemmon Survey	·	1.8 km	MPC · JPL
398039	2009 EB_{25}	—	September 25, 2006	Kitt Peak	Spacewatch	·	1.5 km	MPC · JPL
398040	2009 EK_{27}	—	March 3, 2009	Kitt Peak	Spacewatch	·	1.3 km	MPC · JPL
398041	2009 EN_{30}	—	March 6, 2009	Siding Spring	SSS	·	2.1 km	MPC · JPL
398042	2009 FC	—	March 16, 2009	Tzec Maun	Tozzi, F.	·	2.3 km	MPC · JPL
398043	2009 FF_{15}	—	March 16, 2009	Mount Lemmon	Mount Lemmon Survey	·	2.6 km	MPC · JPL
398044	2009 FP_{15}	—	March 17, 2009	Kitt Peak	Spacewatch	MIS	2.0 km	MPC · JPL
398045 Vitudurum	2009 FN_{19}	Vitudurum	March 21, 2009	Winterthur	M. Griesser	·	2.4 km	MPC · JPL
398046	2009 FB_{28}	—	December 5, 2007	Mount Lemmon	Mount Lemmon Survey	EOS	2.3 km	MPC · JPL
398047	2009 FH_{37}	—	March 24, 2009	Mount Lemmon	Mount Lemmon Survey	·	1.6 km	MPC · JPL
398048	2009 FM_{40}	—	February 24, 2009	Catalina	CSS	·	1.6 km	MPC · JPL
398049	2009 FL_{65}	—	March 2, 2009	Kitt Peak	Spacewatch	·	2.1 km	MPC · JPL
398050	2009 FU_{68}	—	March 19, 2009	Mount Lemmon	Mount Lemmon Survey	·	3.2 km	MPC · JPL
398051	2009 FK_{70}	—	March 19, 2009	Kitt Peak	Spacewatch	·	1.8 km	MPC · JPL
398052	2009 GS_{3}	—	April 15, 2009	Siding Spring	SSS	·	2.3 km	MPC · JPL
398053	2009 HB_{6}	—	April 17, 2009	Kitt Peak	Spacewatch	·	2.2 km	MPC · JPL
398054	2009 HO_{15}	—	April 18, 2009	Kitt Peak	Spacewatch	MRX	1.0 km	MPC · JPL
398055	2009 HF_{17}	—	April 18, 2009	Kitt Peak	Spacewatch	·	1.9 km	MPC · JPL
398056	2009 HA_{20}	—	April 17, 2009	Catalina	CSS	·	2.3 km	MPC · JPL
398057	2009 HP_{25}	—	April 18, 2009	Kitt Peak	Spacewatch	·	2.1 km	MPC · JPL
398058	2009 HR_{25}	—	April 18, 2009	Kitt Peak	Spacewatch	·	3.0 km	MPC · JPL
398059	2009 HV_{35}	—	April 20, 2009	Mount Lemmon	Mount Lemmon Survey	·	2.6 km	MPC · JPL
398060	2009 HG_{38}	—	April 18, 2009	Kitt Peak	Spacewatch	MRX	1 km	MPC · JPL
398061	2009 HF_{46}	—	April 17, 2009	Kitt Peak	Spacewatch	·	2.6 km	MPC · JPL
398062	2009 HF_{47}	—	April 18, 2009	Kitt Peak	Spacewatch	·	2.0 km	MPC · JPL
398063	2009 HQ_{52}	—	April 18, 2009	Mount Lemmon	Mount Lemmon Survey	·	2.1 km	MPC · JPL
398064	2009 HT_{62}	—	March 29, 2009	Mount Lemmon	Mount Lemmon Survey	·	1.8 km	MPC · JPL
398065	2009 HH_{65}	—	April 23, 2009	Kitt Peak	Spacewatch	BRA	1.6 km	MPC · JPL
398066	2009 HR_{66}	—	March 29, 2009	Mount Lemmon	Mount Lemmon Survey	·	1.4 km	MPC · JPL
398067	2009 HK_{81}	—	April 28, 2009	Moletai	K. Černis, Zdanavicius, J.	TIR	2.2 km	MPC · JPL
398068	2009 HW_{96}	—	April 22, 2009	Kitt Peak	Spacewatch	·	1.6 km	MPC · JPL
398069	2009 HC_{97}	—	January 31, 2006	Anderson Mesa	LONEOS	H	630 m	MPC · JPL
398070	2009 HO_{99}	—	April 21, 2009	Kitt Peak	Spacewatch	·	1.8 km	MPC · JPL
398071	2009 HT_{99}	—	April 22, 2009	Mount Lemmon	Mount Lemmon Survey	·	1.8 km	MPC · JPL
398072	2009 HB_{104}	—	April 21, 2009	Kitt Peak	Spacewatch	·	2.2 km	MPC · JPL
398073	2009 HR_{104}	—	April 30, 2009	Kitt Peak	Spacewatch	·	3.5 km	MPC · JPL
398074	2009 HZ_{104}	—	April 18, 2009	Kitt Peak	Spacewatch	MAR	1.2 km	MPC · JPL
398075	2009 HM_{105}	—	April 23, 2009	Kitt Peak	Spacewatch	·	2.0 km	MPC · JPL
398076	2009 JF_{6}	—	April 29, 2009	Kitt Peak	Spacewatch	·	1.9 km	MPC · JPL
398077	2009 JG_{6}	—	May 13, 2009	Kitt Peak	Spacewatch	·	2.3 km	MPC · JPL
398078	2009 JT_{8}	—	May 13, 2009	Kitt Peak	Spacewatch	·	2.7 km	MPC · JPL
398079	2009 JT_{11}	—	December 31, 2007	Kitt Peak	Spacewatch	·	3.2 km	MPC · JPL
398080	2009 JW_{13}	—	May 1, 2009	Cerro Burek	Burek, Cerro	·	1.4 km	MPC · JPL
398081	2009 JB_{17}	—	May 4, 2009	Siding Spring	SSS	·	2.0 km	MPC · JPL
398082	2009 KR_{2}	—	May 19, 2009	Dauban	Kugel, F.	·	2.0 km	MPC · JPL
398083	2009 KJ_{5}	—	December 31, 2007	Mount Lemmon	Mount Lemmon Survey	EOS	1.9 km	MPC · JPL
398084	2009 KU_{5}	—	May 25, 2009	Kitt Peak	Spacewatch	·	1.7 km	MPC · JPL
398085	2009 KP_{13}	—	April 2, 2009	Mount Lemmon	Mount Lemmon Survey	EOS	2.1 km	MPC · JPL
398086	2009 KY_{13}	—	May 26, 2009	Kitt Peak	Spacewatch	·	3.6 km	MPC · JPL
398087	2009 LC_{3}	—	September 17, 2006	Catalina	CSS	·	2.4 km	MPC · JPL
398088	2009 MB_{3}	—	June 17, 2009	Kitt Peak	Spacewatch	·	3.7 km	MPC · JPL
398089	2009 MB_{10}	—	June 19, 2009	Kitt Peak	Spacewatch	·	3.5 km	MPC · JPL
398090	2009 OM_{15}	—	July 29, 2009	Catalina	CSS	·	4.8 km	MPC · JPL
398091	2009 OM_{21}	—	July 31, 2009	Kitt Peak	Spacewatch	L4	10 km	MPC · JPL
398092	2009 OR_{25}	—	October 1, 1999	Kitt Peak	Spacewatch	EMA	3.9 km	MPC · JPL
398093	2009 QE_{5}	—	August 16, 2009	La Sagra	OAM	·	3.8 km	MPC · JPL
398094	2009 QQ_{15}	—	August 16, 2009	Kitt Peak	Spacewatch	·	1.4 km	MPC · JPL
398095	2009 QJ_{65}	—	March 31, 2004	Kitt Peak	Spacewatch	L4 · HEK	10 km	MPC · JPL
398096	2009 RD_{55}	—	September 15, 2009	Kitt Peak	Spacewatch	EOS	2.4 km	MPC · JPL
398097	2009 RV_{75}	—	September 14, 2009	Catalina	CSS	·	4.2 km	MPC · JPL
398098	2009 SX_{5}	—	September 16, 2009	Kitt Peak	Spacewatch	THM	2.4 km	MPC · JPL
398099	2009 SM_{22}	—	September 16, 2009	Kitt Peak	Spacewatch	LUT	5.2 km	MPC · JPL
398100	2009 ST_{25}	—	September 16, 2009	Kitt Peak	Spacewatch	·	3.8 km	MPC · JPL

== 398101–398200 ==
back to top

Designation			Discovery			Properties		Ref
Permanent	Provisional	Named after	Date	Site	Discoverer(s)	Category	Diam.	Ref
398101	2009 SN_{47}	—	September 16, 2009	Kitt Peak	Spacewatch	·	3.6 km	MPC · JPL
398102	2009 SB_{131}	—	September 18, 2009	Kitt Peak	Spacewatch	THM	2.6 km	MPC · JPL
398103	2009 SR_{157}	—	September 20, 2009	Kitt Peak	Spacewatch	·	690 m	MPC · JPL
398104	2009 SQ_{183}	—	September 21, 2009	Kitt Peak	Spacewatch	L4 · HEK	9.3 km	MPC · JPL
398105	2009 SA_{201}	—	September 22, 2009	Mount Lemmon	Mount Lemmon Survey	·	4.1 km	MPC · JPL
398106	2009 SE_{240}	—	August 31, 2009	Siding Spring	SSS	·	4.5 km	MPC · JPL
398107	2009 SL_{241}	—	September 18, 2009	Catalina	CSS	·	4.1 km	MPC · JPL
398108	2009 SF_{243}	—	September 24, 2009	La Sagra	OAM	·	4.6 km	MPC · JPL
398109	2009 SD_{248}	—	September 22, 2009	Kitt Peak	Spacewatch	L4	6.8 km	MPC · JPL
398110	2009 SJ_{284}	—	September 25, 2009	Catalina	CSS	H	600 m	MPC · JPL
398111	2009 SB_{304}	—	September 16, 2009	Kitt Peak	Spacewatch	H	630 m	MPC · JPL
398112	2009 TR_{31}	—	October 15, 2009	Črni Vrh	Vales, J.	·	5.0 km	MPC · JPL
398113	2009 UD_{90}	—	October 20, 2009	Socorro	LINEAR	CYB	3.1 km	MPC · JPL
398114	2009 UB_{134}	—	September 27, 2009	Mount Lemmon	Mount Lemmon Survey	H	460 m	MPC · JPL
398115	2009 UM_{141}	—	October 23, 2009	Kitt Peak	Spacewatch	·	1.2 km	MPC · JPL
398116	2009 VM_{56}	—	September 18, 2003	Kitt Peak	Spacewatch	THM	2.6 km	MPC · JPL
398117	2009 VP_{80}	—	November 11, 2009	Catalina	CSS	T_{j} (2.98) · EUP	6.0 km	MPC · JPL
398118	2009 WZ_{107}	—	November 17, 2009	Mount Lemmon	Mount Lemmon Survey	L4	8.7 km	MPC · JPL
398119	2009 XL_{11}	—	December 10, 2009	Mount Lemmon	Mount Lemmon Survey	·	960 m	MPC · JPL
398120	2010 AM_{61}	—	December 17, 2009	Kitt Peak	Spacewatch	·	580 m	MPC · JPL
398121	2010 AF_{70}	—	January 12, 2010	Catalina	CSS	·	1.7 km	MPC · JPL
398122	2010 AX_{87}	—	September 28, 2009	Mount Lemmon	Mount Lemmon Survey	L4	11 km	MPC · JPL
398123	2010 BF_{59}	—	April 9, 2010	Mount Lemmon	Mount Lemmon Survey	·	1.8 km	MPC · JPL
398124	2010 BE_{72}	—	January 23, 2010	WISE	WISE	·	3.0 km	MPC · JPL
398125	2010 CN_{18}	—	January 8, 2010	Catalina	CSS	PHO	1.2 km	MPC · JPL
398126	2010 CO_{52}	—	February 14, 2010	WISE	WISE	·	2.3 km	MPC · JPL
398127	2010 CF_{64}	—	February 9, 2010	Mount Lemmon	Mount Lemmon Survey	CLA	1.7 km	MPC · JPL
398128	2010 CE_{65}	—	February 9, 2010	Kitt Peak	Spacewatch	NYS	930 m	MPC · JPL
398129	2010 CJ_{65}	—	February 9, 2010	Kitt Peak	Spacewatch	·	960 m	MPC · JPL
398130	2010 CH_{97}	—	February 14, 2010	Mount Lemmon	Mount Lemmon Survey	·	790 m	MPC · JPL
398131	2010 CF_{104}	—	February 14, 2010	Kitt Peak	Spacewatch	·	1.0 km	MPC · JPL
398132	2010 CM_{120}	—	February 15, 2010	Catalina	CSS	·	1.5 km	MPC · JPL
398133	2010 CR_{120}	—	January 12, 2010	Kitt Peak	Spacewatch	·	800 m	MPC · JPL
398134	2010 CK_{123}	—	September 6, 2008	Mount Lemmon	Mount Lemmon Survey	V	600 m	MPC · JPL
398135	2010 CO_{134}	—	February 15, 2010	WISE	WISE	·	2.0 km	MPC · JPL
398136	2010 CO_{137}	—	February 6, 2010	Mount Lemmon	Mount Lemmon Survey	·	750 m	MPC · JPL
398137	2010 CX_{140}	—	March 27, 2003	Kitt Peak	Spacewatch	·	1.1 km	MPC · JPL
398138	2010 CG_{142}	—	September 22, 2008	Mount Lemmon	Mount Lemmon Survey	·	940 m	MPC · JPL
398139	2010 CO_{146}	—	March 24, 2003	Kitt Peak	Spacewatch	·	1.4 km	MPC · JPL
398140	2010 CR_{152}	—	April 19, 2007	Mount Lemmon	Mount Lemmon Survey	·	810 m	MPC · JPL
398141	2010 CY_{158}	—	February 15, 2010	Kitt Peak	Spacewatch	·	870 m	MPC · JPL
398142	2010 CF_{183}	—	February 15, 2010	Haleakala	Pan-STARRS 1	MAS	790 m	MPC · JPL
398143	2010 CK_{203}	—	April 14, 2004	Kitt Peak	Spacewatch	·	4.4 km	MPC · JPL
398144	2010 DE_{41}	—	February 17, 2010	Kitt Peak	Spacewatch	·	2.2 km	MPC · JPL
398145	2010 DH_{75}	—	February 17, 2010	Kitt Peak	Spacewatch	MAS	490 m	MPC · JPL
398146	2010 ED_{36}	—	March 11, 2010	La Sagra	OAM	·	1.6 km	MPC · JPL
398147	2010 EF_{36}	—	March 11, 2010	La Sagra	OAM	·	1.9 km	MPC · JPL
398148	2010 EB_{38}	—	March 12, 2010	Mount Lemmon	Mount Lemmon Survey	·	1.8 km	MPC · JPL
398149	2010 EM_{68}	—	February 27, 2006	Kitt Peak	Spacewatch	·	1.1 km	MPC · JPL
398150	2010 ES_{70}	—	March 12, 2010	Kitt Peak	Spacewatch	·	1.0 km	MPC · JPL
398151	2010 EA_{71}	—	March 12, 2010	Kitt Peak	Spacewatch	MAS	660 m	MPC · JPL
398152	2010 EP_{74}	—	March 11, 2010	Moletai	K. Černis, Zdanavicius, J.	·	1.1 km	MPC · JPL
398153	2010 EO_{102}	—	March 12, 2010	Kitt Peak	Spacewatch	·	1.1 km	MPC · JPL
398154	2010 EE_{107}	—	March 12, 2010	Kitt Peak	Spacewatch	·	1.3 km	MPC · JPL
398155	2010 ER_{108}	—	March 14, 2010	Kitt Peak	Spacewatch	·	1.9 km	MPC · JPL
398156	2010 ES_{113}	—	February 17, 2010	Catalina	CSS	H	720 m	MPC · JPL
398157	2010 EG_{120}	—	April 25, 2003	Kitt Peak	Spacewatch	NYS	780 m	MPC · JPL
398158	2010 EM_{122}	—	March 15, 2010	Kitt Peak	Spacewatch	·	1.8 km	MPC · JPL
398159	2010 FU_{11}	—	February 27, 2006	Kitt Peak	Spacewatch	·	1.3 km	MPC · JPL
398160	2010 FK_{17}	—	February 15, 2010	Kitt Peak	Spacewatch	·	1.6 km	MPC · JPL
398161	2010 FX_{24}	—	September 11, 2007	Mount Lemmon	Mount Lemmon Survey	·	2.1 km	MPC · JPL
398162	2010 FU_{26}	—	March 19, 2010	Purple Mountain	PMO NEO Survey Program	·	1.4 km	MPC · JPL
398163	2010 FS_{47}	—	March 22, 2010	ESA OGS	ESA OGS	·	1.3 km	MPC · JPL
398164	2010 FD_{95}	—	March 21, 2010	Mount Lemmon	Mount Lemmon Survey	·	970 m	MPC · JPL
398165	2010 FM_{99}	—	March 15, 2010	Mount Lemmon	Mount Lemmon Survey	MAS	690 m	MPC · JPL
398166	2010 GG_{32}	—	April 7, 2010	Catalina	CSS	ERI	1.9 km	MPC · JPL
398167	2010 GQ_{81}	—	April 11, 2010	WISE	WISE	DOR	2.5 km	MPC · JPL
398168	2010 GY_{104}	—	April 7, 2010	Kitt Peak	Spacewatch	·	1.6 km	MPC · JPL
398169	2010 GY_{127}	—	April 11, 2010	Kitt Peak	Spacewatch	·	1.5 km	MPC · JPL
398170	2010 GO_{133}	—	April 11, 2010	Kitt Peak	Spacewatch	ADE	2.1 km	MPC · JPL
398171	2010 GF_{159}	—	January 23, 2006	Kitt Peak	Spacewatch	·	1.3 km	MPC · JPL
398172	2010 HN_{23}	—	April 17, 2010	Bergisch Gladbach	W. Bickel	·	1.8 km	MPC · JPL
398173	2010 HZ_{24}	—	April 18, 2010	WISE	WISE	·	1.7 km	MPC · JPL
398174	2010 HT_{37}	—	April 21, 2010	WISE	WISE	·	2.2 km	MPC · JPL
398175	2010 HW_{97}	—	April 30, 2010	WISE	WISE	·	3.3 km	MPC · JPL
398176	2010 JW_{31}	—	May 6, 2010	Kitt Peak	Spacewatch	·	1.4 km	MPC · JPL
398177	2010 JE_{38}	—	April 13, 2010	Mount Lemmon	Mount Lemmon Survey	·	2.4 km	MPC · JPL
398178	2010 JS_{74}	—	February 14, 2010	Kitt Peak	Spacewatch	·	2.3 km	MPC · JPL
398179	2010 JD_{78}	—	April 26, 2006	Mount Lemmon	Mount Lemmon Survey	·	1.1 km	MPC · JPL
398180	2010 JE_{105}	—	May 12, 2010	WISE	WISE	·	1.4 km	MPC · JPL
398181	2010 JC_{113}	—	April 10, 2010	Mount Lemmon	Mount Lemmon Survey	EUN	1.2 km	MPC · JPL
398182	2010 JC_{174}	—	September 13, 2007	Mount Lemmon	Mount Lemmon Survey	·	1.2 km	MPC · JPL
398183	2010 JF_{178}	—	May 23, 2006	Mount Lemmon	Mount Lemmon Survey	·	1.8 km	MPC · JPL
398184	2010 KX_{60}	—	May 25, 2010	WISE	WISE	·	1.1 km	MPC · JPL
398185	2010 KT_{61}	—	December 18, 2003	Socorro	LINEAR	·	6.0 km	MPC · JPL
398186	2010 KY_{119}	—	May 30, 2010	WISE	WISE	EOS ·	3.3 km	MPC · JPL
398187	2010 KK_{128}	—	May 21, 2010	Mount Lemmon	Mount Lemmon Survey	·	1.3 km	MPC · JPL
398188 Agni	2010 LE_{15}	Agni	June 3, 2010	WISE	WISE	ATE · PHA	460 m	MPC · JPL
398189	2010 LY_{65}	—	June 13, 2010	Mount Lemmon	Mount Lemmon Survey	·	2.1 km	MPC · JPL
398190	2010 LW_{82}	—	April 27, 2009	Kitt Peak	Spacewatch	fast	4.5 km	MPC · JPL
398191	2010 LO_{110}	—	September 13, 2007	Mount Lemmon	Mount Lemmon Survey	·	1.2 km	MPC · JPL
398192	2010 MM_{6}	—	November 1, 2006	Mount Lemmon	Mount Lemmon Survey	·	2.7 km	MPC · JPL
398193	2010 MR_{8}	—	June 16, 2010	WISE	WISE	EUP	4.0 km	MPC · JPL
398194	2010 ME_{20}	—	June 18, 2010	WISE	WISE	ARM	4.4 km	MPC · JPL
398195	2010 MZ_{25}	—	June 19, 2010	WISE	WISE	·	4.7 km	MPC · JPL
398196	2010 MJ_{30}	—	June 20, 2010	WISE	WISE	·	3.3 km	MPC · JPL
398197	2010 MR_{31}	—	June 20, 2010	WISE	WISE	·	2.6 km	MPC · JPL
398198	2010 MN_{64}	—	June 24, 2010	WISE	WISE	THM	2.4 km	MPC · JPL
398199	2010 MF_{72}	—	June 25, 2010	WISE	WISE	·	3.5 km	MPC · JPL
398200	2010 MR_{74}	—	June 26, 2010	WISE	WISE	EMA	3.0 km	MPC · JPL

== 398201–398300 ==
back to top

Designation			Discovery			Properties		Ref
Permanent	Provisional	Named after	Date	Site	Discoverer(s)	Category	Diam.	Ref
398201	2010 MQ_{96}	—	February 28, 2009	Mount Lemmon	Mount Lemmon Survey	·	2.6 km	MPC · JPL
398202	2010 MC_{100}	—	June 29, 2010	WISE	WISE	THM	2.6 km	MPC · JPL
398203	2010 MX_{105}	—	June 30, 2010	WISE	WISE	·	2.7 km	MPC · JPL
398204	2010 MU_{108}	—	June 30, 2010	WISE	WISE	MIS	2.5 km	MPC · JPL
398205	2010 MO_{115}	—	June 30, 2010	WISE	WISE	·	3.0 km	MPC · JPL
398206	2010 NP_{6}	—	July 8, 2010	Kitt Peak	Spacewatch	·	2.9 km	MPC · JPL
398207	2010 ND_{28}	—	November 23, 2006	Mount Lemmon	Mount Lemmon Survey	·	2.9 km	MPC · JPL
398208	2010 NX_{31}	—	July 7, 2010	WISE	WISE	·	3.2 km	MPC · JPL
398209	2010 ND_{81}	—	March 11, 2008	Kitt Peak	Spacewatch	·	3.9 km	MPC · JPL
398210	2010 NQ_{87}	—	July 2, 2010	WISE	WISE	·	3.1 km	MPC · JPL
398211	2010 NC_{99}	—	October 31, 2005	Mount Lemmon	Mount Lemmon Survey	THM	2.7 km	MPC · JPL
398212	2010 NF_{105}	—	July 12, 2010	WISE	WISE	CYB	5.1 km	MPC · JPL
398213	2010 NV_{105}	—	July 12, 2010	WISE	WISE	EUP	3.5 km	MPC · JPL
398214	2010 NY_{106}	—	July 12, 2010	WISE	WISE	EOS	3.0 km	MPC · JPL
398215	2010 NX_{107}	—	November 9, 2005	Catalina	CSS	·	3.7 km	MPC · JPL
398216	2010 NP_{117}	—	July 13, 2010	La Sagra	OAM	(1547)	1.7 km	MPC · JPL
398217	2010 OD_{16}	—	July 17, 2010	WISE	WISE	·	5.0 km	MPC · JPL
398218	2010 OZ_{32}	—	October 27, 2005	Mount Lemmon	Mount Lemmon Survey	EMA	3.3 km	MPC · JPL
398219	2010 OM_{63}	—	August 25, 2004	Kitt Peak	Spacewatch	·	3.3 km	MPC · JPL
398220	2010 OZ_{71}	—	July 25, 2010	WISE	WISE	·	2.0 km	MPC · JPL
398221	2010 OW_{76}	—	August 11, 2004	Siding Spring	SSS	THB	4.0 km	MPC · JPL
398222	2010 OR_{89}	—	July 27, 2010	WISE	WISE	·	3.0 km	MPC · JPL
398223	2010 OW_{119}	—	July 31, 2010	WISE	WISE	·	3.7 km	MPC · JPL
398224	2010 OH_{125}	—	July 31, 2010	WISE	WISE	·	3.1 km	MPC · JPL
398225	2010 PR_{27}	—	February 16, 2007	Mount Lemmon	Mount Lemmon Survey	·	5.2 km	MPC · JPL
398226	2010 PU_{30}	—	April 14, 2008	Kitt Peak	Spacewatch	VER	3.5 km	MPC · JPL
398227	2010 PV_{68}	—	August 9, 2010	WISE	WISE	·	4.8 km	MPC · JPL
398228	2010 PE_{73}	—	August 3, 2010	La Sagra	OAM	·	1.7 km	MPC · JPL
398229	2010 PJ_{78}	—	December 2, 2005	Kitt Peak	Spacewatch	·	3.2 km	MPC · JPL
398230	2010 QQ_{1}	—	April 11, 2003	Kitt Peak	Spacewatch	·	4.2 km	MPC · JPL
398231	2010 QS_{1}	—	May 6, 2005	Catalina	CSS	·	2.7 km	MPC · JPL
398232	2010 QH_{4}	—	August 31, 2010	Marly	P. Kocher	·	3.3 km	MPC · JPL
398233	2010 RK_{10}	—	January 27, 2007	Kitt Peak	Spacewatch	·	2.6 km	MPC · JPL
398234	2010 RG_{17}	—	April 30, 2009	Kitt Peak	Spacewatch	BRA	1.5 km	MPC · JPL
398235	2010 RS_{46}	—	November 25, 2005	Catalina	CSS	·	4.8 km	MPC · JPL
398236	2010 RD_{52}	—	July 9, 2010	WISE	WISE	THM	2.4 km	MPC · JPL
398237	2010 RE_{54}	—	September 4, 2010	La Sagra	OAM	·	3.4 km	MPC · JPL
398238	2010 RQ_{60}	—	September 6, 2010	Kitt Peak	Spacewatch	·	3.2 km	MPC · JPL
398239	2010 RT_{71}	—	February 27, 2008	Mount Lemmon	Mount Lemmon Survey	·	3.4 km	MPC · JPL
398240	2010 RA_{76}	—	March 19, 2009	Mount Lemmon	Mount Lemmon Survey	BRA	1.6 km	MPC · JPL
398241	2010 RL_{96}	—	September 2, 2010	Mount Lemmon	Mount Lemmon Survey	·	2.2 km	MPC · JPL
398242	2010 RC_{102}	—	April 26, 2008	Mount Lemmon	Mount Lemmon Survey	·	2.7 km	MPC · JPL
398243	2010 RH_{103}	—	September 28, 2006	Mount Lemmon	Mount Lemmon Survey	·	1.7 km	MPC · JPL
398244	2010 RO_{107}	—	October 4, 1999	Kitt Peak	Spacewatch	EOS	1.8 km	MPC · JPL
398245	2010 RX_{112}	—	October 28, 2005	Mount Lemmon	Mount Lemmon Survey	EOS	2.0 km	MPC · JPL
398246	2010 RA_{113}	—	November 25, 2006	Kitt Peak	Spacewatch	·	1.7 km	MPC · JPL
398247	2010 RK_{115}	—	October 25, 2005	Mount Lemmon	Mount Lemmon Survey	·	2.4 km	MPC · JPL
398248	2010 RA_{117}	—	September 11, 2010	Kitt Peak	Spacewatch	·	1.6 km	MPC · JPL
398249	2010 RA_{138}	—	September 10, 2010	Mount Lemmon	Mount Lemmon Survey	EOS	1.9 km	MPC · JPL
398250	2010 RD_{143}	—	September 29, 2005	Kitt Peak	Spacewatch	·	1.7 km	MPC · JPL
398251	2010 RA_{149}	—	September 15, 2010	Kitt Peak	Spacewatch	·	2.2 km	MPC · JPL
398252	2010 RC_{168}	—	October 1, 2005	Mount Lemmon	Mount Lemmon Survey	·	2.2 km	MPC · JPL
398253	2010 RC_{170}	—	September 24, 2005	Kitt Peak	Spacewatch	EOS	1.5 km	MPC · JPL
398254	2010 RU_{173}	—	November 25, 2005	Kitt Peak	Spacewatch	·	2.4 km	MPC · JPL
398255	2010 RN_{174}	—	October 14, 1999	Kitt Peak	Spacewatch	·	3.2 km	MPC · JPL
398256	2010 RN_{179}	—	October 9, 1993	Kitt Peak	Spacewatch	·	1.3 km	MPC · JPL
398257	2010 RN_{180}	—	September 14, 2006	Catalina	CSS	·	1.3 km	MPC · JPL
398258	2010 SL_{25}	—	April 3, 2008	Mount Lemmon	Mount Lemmon Survey	·	2.1 km	MPC · JPL
398259	2010 TA_{5}	—	April 29, 2008	Mount Lemmon	Mount Lemmon Survey	VER	2.9 km	MPC · JPL
398260	2010 TT_{10}	—	October 20, 2005	Mount Lemmon	Mount Lemmon Survey	·	2.5 km	MPC · JPL
398261	2010 TK_{13}	—	October 3, 2010	Kitt Peak	Spacewatch	·	730 m	MPC · JPL
398262	2010 TA_{31}	—	October 25, 2005	Mount Lemmon	Mount Lemmon Survey	·	2.0 km	MPC · JPL
398263	2010 TC_{40}	—	March 14, 2007	Kitt Peak	Spacewatch	CYB	3.7 km	MPC · JPL
398264	2010 TQ_{42}	—	October 27, 2005	Kitt Peak	Spacewatch	EOS	1.8 km	MPC · JPL
398265	2010 TT_{45}	—	April 15, 2008	Mount Lemmon	Mount Lemmon Survey	·	2.4 km	MPC · JPL
398266	2010 TU_{49}	—	March 15, 2008	Kitt Peak	Spacewatch	·	2.2 km	MPC · JPL
398267	2010 TU_{90}	—	March 8, 2008	Kitt Peak	Spacewatch	EOS	2.0 km	MPC · JPL
398268	2010 TV_{98}	—	March 10, 2008	Kitt Peak	Spacewatch	EOS	1.4 km	MPC · JPL
398269	2010 TH_{104}	—	September 11, 2004	Kitt Peak	Spacewatch	·	2.6 km	MPC · JPL
398270	2010 TC_{109}	—	October 3, 1999	Kitt Peak	Spacewatch	·	3.1 km	MPC · JPL
398271	2010 TV_{113}	—	October 9, 2010	Kitt Peak	Spacewatch	THM	2.0 km	MPC · JPL
398272	2010 TC_{119}	—	October 9, 2010	Kitt Peak	Spacewatch	·	2.8 km	MPC · JPL
398273	2010 TG_{119}	—	October 1, 2005	Mount Lemmon	Mount Lemmon Survey	·	2.6 km	MPC · JPL
398274	2010 TT_{119}	—	October 31, 1999	Kitt Peak	Spacewatch	·	2.5 km	MPC · JPL
398275	2010 TB_{170}	—	October 12, 2010	Mount Lemmon	Mount Lemmon Survey	·	3.1 km	MPC · JPL
398276	2010 TZ_{174}	—	September 14, 2010	Kitt Peak	Spacewatch	·	3.8 km	MPC · JPL
398277	2010 TD_{186}	—	March 5, 2008	Kitt Peak	Spacewatch	EOS	1.6 km	MPC · JPL
398278	2010 TM_{186}	—	March 27, 2003	Kitt Peak	Spacewatch	·	3.0 km	MPC · JPL
398279	2010 UK_{2}	—	October 17, 2010	Mount Lemmon	Mount Lemmon Survey	·	2.5 km	MPC · JPL
398280	2010 UB_{10}	—	October 6, 1996	Kitt Peak	Spacewatch	·	2.0 km	MPC · JPL
398281	2010 UA_{20}	—	April 15, 2008	Mount Lemmon	Mount Lemmon Survey	·	3.2 km	MPC · JPL
398282	2010 UQ_{35}	—	September 3, 2004	Siding Spring	SSS	·	3.3 km	MPC · JPL
398283	2010 UP_{61}	—	December 4, 2005	Kitt Peak	Spacewatch	THM	2.2 km	MPC · JPL
398284	2010 UX_{69}	—	October 8, 1999	Kitt Peak	Spacewatch	·	3.6 km	MPC · JPL
398285	2010 UL_{71}	—	October 24, 2005	Kitt Peak	Spacewatch	·	2.0 km	MPC · JPL
398286	2010 UV_{74}	—	October 13, 2010	Mount Lemmon	Mount Lemmon Survey	L4	10 km	MPC · JPL
398287	2010 UA_{97}	—	August 22, 2004	Kitt Peak	Spacewatch	·	3.0 km	MPC · JPL
398288	2010 VP_{14}	—	October 19, 2010	Mount Lemmon	Mount Lemmon Survey	·	2.5 km	MPC · JPL
398289	2010 VU_{16}	—	July 23, 2010	WISE	WISE	·	2.2 km	MPC · JPL
398290	2010 VT_{31}	—	September 11, 2004	Socorro	LINEAR	TIR	3.4 km	MPC · JPL
398291	2010 VV_{73}	—	September 19, 1998	Kitt Peak	Spacewatch	·	3.5 km	MPC · JPL
398292	2010 VO_{90}	—	November 6, 2010	Kitt Peak	Spacewatch	EOS	2.1 km	MPC · JPL
398293	2010 VZ_{125}	—	March 29, 2008	Mount Lemmon	Mount Lemmon Survey	TIR	3.9 km	MPC · JPL
398294	2010 VK_{153}	—	October 5, 2005	Catalina	CSS	·	3.0 km	MPC · JPL
398295	2010 VY_{159}	—	September 16, 2009	Mount Lemmon	Mount Lemmon Survey	EOS	2.1 km	MPC · JPL
398296	2010 VD_{168}	—	September 11, 2010	Mount Lemmon	Mount Lemmon Survey	·	3.2 km	MPC · JPL
398297	2010 VF_{178}	—	October 16, 2009	Mount Lemmon	Mount Lemmon Survey	L4	8.3 km	MPC · JPL
398298	2010 VH_{200}	—	November 7, 2010	Mount Lemmon	Mount Lemmon Survey	H	730 m	MPC · JPL
398299	2010 VO_{203}	—	September 16, 2010	Mount Lemmon	Mount Lemmon Survey	·	2.9 km	MPC · JPL
398300	2010 VN_{207}	—	September 13, 2004	Socorro	LINEAR	·	4.0 km	MPC · JPL

== 398301–398400 ==
back to top

Designation			Discovery			Properties		Ref
Permanent	Provisional	Named after	Date	Site	Discoverer(s)	Category	Diam.	Ref
398301	2010 VL_{211}	—	January 26, 2007	Kitt Peak	Spacewatch	·	2.4 km	MPC · JPL
398302	2010 WR_{32}	—	November 1, 2010	Kitt Peak	Spacewatch	THM	2.8 km	MPC · JPL
398303	2010 WQ_{57}	—	April 4, 2008	Kitt Peak	Spacewatch	T_{j} (2.99) · (895)	3.6 km	MPC · JPL
398304	2010 WF_{62}	—	November 20, 1993	Kitt Peak	Spacewatch	·	3.1 km	MPC · JPL
398305	2010 XZ_{30}	—	October 9, 2004	Kitt Peak	Spacewatch	·	2.5 km	MPC · JPL
398306	2010 XC_{44}	—	May 30, 2009	Kitt Peak	Spacewatch	·	4.8 km	MPC · JPL
398307	2010 XA_{74}	—	April 4, 2008	Kitt Peak	Spacewatch	·	3.5 km	MPC · JPL
398308	2010 YL_{3}	—	September 8, 2004	Socorro	LINEAR	·	3.4 km	MPC · JPL
398309	2011 AD_{11}	—	November 15, 2010	Mount Lemmon	Mount Lemmon Survey	·	3.3 km	MPC · JPL
398310	2011 BC_{1}	—	February 2, 2006	Kitt Peak	Spacewatch	·	3.4 km	MPC · JPL
398311	2011 EX_{33}	—	August 17, 2009	Kitt Peak	Spacewatch	H	560 m	MPC · JPL
398312	2011 EZ_{77}	—	September 19, 2009	Mount Lemmon	Mount Lemmon Survey	H	630 m	MPC · JPL
398313	2011 FT_{47}	—	March 29, 2011	Kitt Peak	Spacewatch	EOS	2.1 km	MPC · JPL
398314	2011 FO_{100}	—	October 8, 2005	Kitt Peak	Spacewatch	·	1.4 km	MPC · JPL
398315	2011 GH_{65}	—	November 24, 2001	Socorro	LINEAR	H	680 m	MPC · JPL
398316	2011 HF_{12}	—	March 27, 2011	Kitt Peak	Spacewatch	·	860 m	MPC · JPL
398317	2011 HL_{46}	—	October 1, 2005	Anderson Mesa	LONEOS	V	720 m	MPC · JPL
398318	2011 HA_{61}	—	March 27, 2011	Mount Lemmon	Mount Lemmon Survey	·	2.4 km	MPC · JPL
398319	2011 KT_{2}	—	January 10, 2007	Kitt Peak	Spacewatch	·	720 m	MPC · JPL
398320	2011 KC_{14}	—	May 6, 2006	Mount Lemmon	Mount Lemmon Survey	·	2.3 km	MPC · JPL
398321	2011 KV_{36}	—	April 26, 2011	Kitt Peak	Spacewatch	EOS	2.3 km	MPC · JPL
398322	2011 NP_{2}	—	March 10, 2007	Mount Lemmon	Mount Lemmon Survey	·	600 m	MPC · JPL
398323	2011 OP_{10}	—	April 18, 2007	Mount Lemmon	Mount Lemmon Survey	·	970 m	MPC · JPL
398324	2011 OX_{45}	—	November 8, 2008	Mount Lemmon	Mount Lemmon Survey	·	1.8 km	MPC · JPL
398325	2011 OT_{53}	—	December 8, 2005	Kitt Peak	Spacewatch	·	1.2 km	MPC · JPL
398326	2011 OX_{54}	—	February 16, 2010	Mount Lemmon	Mount Lemmon Survey	·	2.0 km	MPC · JPL
398327	2011 PL_{1}	—	September 23, 2004	Kitt Peak	Spacewatch	·	820 m	MPC · JPL
398328	2011 PC_{10}	—	September 23, 2008	Mount Lemmon	Mount Lemmon Survey	V	540 m	MPC · JPL
398329	2011 QA_{1}	—	November 30, 2005	Mount Lemmon	Mount Lemmon Survey	·	1.6 km	MPC · JPL
398330	2011 QH_{1}	—	January 14, 1996	Kitt Peak	Spacewatch	·	1.8 km	MPC · JPL
398331	2011 QL_{9}	—	September 29, 2008	Kitt Peak	Spacewatch	·	880 m	MPC · JPL
398332	2011 QE_{17}	—	February 2, 2006	Kitt Peak	Spacewatch	·	1.4 km	MPC · JPL
398333	2011 QA_{19}	—	March 18, 2010	Mount Lemmon	Mount Lemmon Survey	(2076)	820 m	MPC · JPL
398334	2011 QP_{29}	—	January 18, 2009	Kitt Peak	Spacewatch	·	2.1 km	MPC · JPL
398335	2011 QD_{31}	—	October 8, 2007	Catalina	CSS	EUN	1.5 km	MPC · JPL
398336	2011 QB_{36}	—	June 25, 2011	Mount Lemmon	Mount Lemmon Survey	·	1.3 km	MPC · JPL
398337	2011 QZ_{36}	—	October 16, 1977	Palomar	C. J. van Houten, I. van Houten-Groeneveld, T. Gehrels	·	780 m	MPC · JPL
398338	2011 QV_{38}	—	October 5, 2004	Anderson Mesa	LONEOS	·	1.3 km	MPC · JPL
398339	2011 QR_{52}	—	September 24, 1992	Kitt Peak	Spacewatch	·	1.3 km	MPC · JPL
398340	2011 QB_{57}	—	September 24, 2000	Socorro	LINEAR	·	1.1 km	MPC · JPL
398341	2011 QN_{65}	—	January 2, 2009	Mount Lemmon	Mount Lemmon Survey	NYS	1.3 km	MPC · JPL
398342	2011 QP_{70}	—	February 1, 2006	Mount Lemmon	Mount Lemmon Survey	(2076)	670 m	MPC · JPL
398343	2011 QF_{72}	—	September 8, 2004	Socorro	LINEAR	·	890 m	MPC · JPL
398344	2011 QE_{73}	—	February 16, 2010	Mount Lemmon	Mount Lemmon Survey	·	880 m	MPC · JPL
398345	2011 QM_{81}	—	December 22, 2008	Kitt Peak	Spacewatch	·	1.0 km	MPC · JPL
398346	2011 QY_{87}	—	October 6, 2004	Kitt Peak	Spacewatch	·	780 m	MPC · JPL
398347	2011 QC_{93}	—	September 23, 2004	Kitt Peak	Spacewatch	·	770 m	MPC · JPL
398348	2011 QM_{97}	—	September 5, 2007	Mount Lemmon	Mount Lemmon Survey	·	1.2 km	MPC · JPL
398349	2011 RS_{13}	—	November 19, 2004	Socorro	LINEAR	·	1.2 km	MPC · JPL
398350	2011 RL_{17}	—	March 13, 2005	Catalina	CSS	·	1.6 km	MPC · JPL
398351	2011 RB_{19}	—	March 13, 2010	Mount Lemmon	Mount Lemmon Survey	·	1.2 km	MPC · JPL
398352	2011 ST_{3}	—	June 17, 2007	Kitt Peak	Spacewatch	V	900 m	MPC · JPL
398353	2011 SO_{10}	—	October 7, 2004	Kitt Peak	Spacewatch	ERI	2.5 km	MPC · JPL
398354	2011 SP_{27}	—	January 2, 2009	Mount Lemmon	Mount Lemmon Survey	NYS	1.3 km	MPC · JPL
398355	2011 SF_{32}	—	September 21, 2011	Catalina	CSS	·	1.7 km	MPC · JPL
398356	2011 SN_{35}	—	February 20, 2006	Kitt Peak	Spacewatch	MAS	780 m	MPC · JPL
398357	2011 SC_{49}	—	February 17, 2010	Kitt Peak	Spacewatch	·	910 m	MPC · JPL
398358	2011 SO_{49}	—	June 21, 2007	Mount Lemmon	Mount Lemmon Survey	NYS	920 m	MPC · JPL
398359	2011 SA_{60}	—	September 5, 1996	Kitt Peak	Spacewatch	NYS	1.0 km	MPC · JPL
398360	2011 SS_{61}	—	October 6, 2004	Kitt Peak	Spacewatch	·	810 m	MPC · JPL
398361	2011 SD_{67}	—	September 24, 2000	Socorro	LINEAR	·	1.4 km	MPC · JPL
398362	2011 SX_{68}	—	January 28, 2009	Catalina	CSS	·	2.2 km	MPC · JPL
398363	2011 SX_{69}	—	October 25, 2007	Mount Lemmon	Mount Lemmon Survey	·	2.2 km	MPC · JPL
398364	2011 SG_{76}	—	January 16, 2005	Kitt Peak	Spacewatch	(5)	1.5 km	MPC · JPL
398365	2011 SL_{84}	—	May 1, 2003	Kitt Peak	Spacewatch	NYS	1.0 km	MPC · JPL
398366	2011 ST_{88}	—	October 13, 2006	Kitt Peak	Spacewatch	EOS	1.8 km	MPC · JPL
398367	2011 SB_{91}	—	October 1, 2000	Socorro	LINEAR	EUP	3.4 km	MPC · JPL
398368	2011 SB_{96}	—	September 24, 2011	Mount Lemmon	Mount Lemmon Survey	·	990 m	MPC · JPL
398369	2011 SL_{97}	—	May 12, 2007	Mount Lemmon	Mount Lemmon Survey	·	1.3 km	MPC · JPL
398370	2011 SW_{98}	—	September 8, 2011	Kitt Peak	Spacewatch	CYB	2.7 km	MPC · JPL
398371	2011 SL_{99}	—	September 2, 2008	Kitt Peak	Spacewatch	·	860 m	MPC · JPL
398372	2011 SE_{102}	—	March 1, 2009	Mount Lemmon	Mount Lemmon Survey	·	1.3 km	MPC · JPL
398373	2011 SK_{102}	—	September 25, 1998	Anderson Mesa	LONEOS	·	2.2 km	MPC · JPL
398374	2011 SE_{103}	—	January 13, 2008	Kitt Peak	Spacewatch	·	2.3 km	MPC · JPL
398375	2011 SK_{104}	—	September 23, 2011	Kitt Peak	Spacewatch	·	1.9 km	MPC · JPL
398376	2011 SD_{105}	—	August 28, 2006	Catalina	CSS	·	2.3 km	MPC · JPL
398377	2011 SS_{113}	—	October 13, 2004	Kitt Peak	Spacewatch	·	770 m	MPC · JPL
398378	2011 SY_{114}	—	September 15, 2007	Mount Lemmon	Mount Lemmon Survey	·	1.2 km	MPC · JPL
398379	2011 SW_{117}	—	September 6, 1996	Kitt Peak	Spacewatch	NYS	1.1 km	MPC · JPL
398380	2011 SC_{119}	—	September 24, 2000	Socorro	LINEAR	·	1.2 km	MPC · JPL
398381	2011 SV_{143}	—	May 13, 2010	Mount Lemmon	Mount Lemmon Survey	·	1.9 km	MPC · JPL
398382	2011 ST_{144}	—	March 18, 2010	Mount Lemmon	Mount Lemmon Survey	·	1.1 km	MPC · JPL
398383	2011 SW_{149}	—	March 21, 2010	Kitt Peak	Spacewatch	·	1.1 km	MPC · JPL
398384	2011 SX_{152}	—	October 12, 2007	Mount Lemmon	Mount Lemmon Survey	·	1.4 km	MPC · JPL
398385	2011 SR_{157}	—	February 20, 2009	Kitt Peak	Spacewatch	·	1.6 km	MPC · JPL
398386	2011 SJ_{158}	—	September 20, 2011	Catalina	CSS	·	1.2 km	MPC · JPL
398387	2011 ST_{167}	—	September 3, 2007	Catalina	CSS	·	970 m	MPC · JPL
398388	2011 SU_{168}	—	April 12, 1999	Kitt Peak	Spacewatch	·	1.2 km	MPC · JPL
398389	2011 SF_{169}	—	March 4, 2005	Mount Lemmon	Mount Lemmon Survey	·	990 m	MPC · JPL
398390	2011 SQ_{172}	—	September 18, 2007	Mount Lemmon	Mount Lemmon Survey	·	1.4 km	MPC · JPL
398391	2011 SP_{173}	—	July 18, 2007	Mount Lemmon	Mount Lemmon Survey	·	990 m	MPC · JPL
398392	2011 SR_{173}	—	October 12, 2007	Catalina	CSS	·	1.3 km	MPC · JPL
398393	2011 SO_{177}	—	November 11, 2007	Mount Lemmon	Mount Lemmon Survey	·	2.0 km	MPC · JPL
398394	2011 SP_{180}	—	March 9, 2005	Mount Lemmon	Mount Lemmon Survey	·	1.8 km	MPC · JPL
398395	2011 SD_{184}	—	November 8, 2007	Kitt Peak	Spacewatch	·	1.3 km	MPC · JPL
398396	2011 SL_{186}	—	February 27, 2006	Kitt Peak	Spacewatch	·	1.3 km	MPC · JPL
398397	2011 SV_{195}	—	May 1, 2003	Kitt Peak	Spacewatch	MAS	600 m	MPC · JPL
398398	2011 ST_{197}	—	September 18, 2011	Mount Lemmon	Mount Lemmon Survey	·	1.6 km	MPC · JPL
398399	2011 SU_{201}	—	June 15, 2007	Kitt Peak	Spacewatch	·	830 m	MPC · JPL
398400	2011 SJ_{203}	—	November 11, 2006	Kitt Peak	Spacewatch	·	3.7 km	MPC · JPL

== 398401–398500 ==
back to top

Designation			Discovery			Properties		Ref
Permanent	Provisional	Named after	Date	Site	Discoverer(s)	Category	Diam.	Ref
398401	2011 SO_{211}	—	March 8, 2005	Kitt Peak	Spacewatch	·	2.4 km	MPC · JPL
398402	2011 SM_{214}	—	October 19, 2007	Catalina	CSS	·	1.4 km	MPC · JPL
398403	2011 SK_{215}	—	January 23, 2006	Kitt Peak	Spacewatch	·	1.5 km	MPC · JPL
398404	2011 SH_{217}	—	January 23, 2006	Kitt Peak	Spacewatch	·	1.2 km	MPC · JPL
398405	2011 SM_{218}	—	November 17, 2006	Mount Lemmon	Mount Lemmon Survey	VER	3.1 km	MPC · JPL
398406	2011 SO_{219}	—	May 10, 2005	Kitt Peak	Spacewatch	·	2.2 km	MPC · JPL
398407	2011 SC_{229}	—	March 18, 2009	Mount Lemmon	Mount Lemmon Survey	·	1.7 km	MPC · JPL
398408	2011 SR_{230}	—	September 28, 2011	Mount Lemmon	Mount Lemmon Survey	WIT	940 m	MPC · JPL
398409	2011 SJ_{231}	—	May 10, 2005	Kitt Peak	Spacewatch	·	2.4 km	MPC · JPL
398410	2011 SE_{233}	—	December 19, 2007	Catalina	CSS	·	2.1 km	MPC · JPL
398411	2011 SN_{235}	—	May 6, 2010	Mount Lemmon	Mount Lemmon Survey	·	1.2 km	MPC · JPL
398412	2011 SY_{245}	—	September 29, 2011	Mount Lemmon	Mount Lemmon Survey	·	1.7 km	MPC · JPL
398413	2011 SC_{248}	—	September 24, 2000	Socorro	LINEAR	NYS	1.2 km	MPC · JPL
398414	2011 SY_{252}	—	March 15, 2010	Kitt Peak	Spacewatch	·	2.0 km	MPC · JPL
398415	2011 SR_{253}	—	October 11, 2007	Catalina	CSS	·	980 m	MPC · JPL
398416	2011 SQ_{258}	—	September 26, 2006	Catalina	CSS	·	2.4 km	MPC · JPL
398417	2011 SX_{264}	—	June 17, 2006	Kitt Peak	Spacewatch	·	1.8 km	MPC · JPL
398418	2011 SR_{266}	—	March 12, 2005	Kitt Peak	Spacewatch	·	1.8 km	MPC · JPL
398419	2011 SX_{267}	—	January 23, 2006	Kitt Peak	Spacewatch	·	1.4 km	MPC · JPL
398420	2011 TW_{2}	—	November 20, 2007	Mount Lemmon	Mount Lemmon Survey	EUN	1.5 km	MPC · JPL
398421	2011 TN_{4}	—	December 31, 2007	Kitt Peak	Spacewatch	·	2.5 km	MPC · JPL
398422	2011 TR_{4}	—	October 10, 2007	Mount Lemmon	Mount Lemmon Survey	·	2.0 km	MPC · JPL
398423	2011 UF_{2}	—	September 20, 2011	Kitt Peak	Spacewatch	·	1.5 km	MPC · JPL
398424	2011 UC_{7}	—	April 12, 2005	Kitt Peak	Spacewatch	MRX	960 m	MPC · JPL
398425	2011 UD_{8}	—	October 20, 2007	Mount Lemmon	Mount Lemmon Survey	·	1.5 km	MPC · JPL
398426	2011 UT_{8}	—	April 21, 2009	Kitt Peak	Spacewatch	·	2.7 km	MPC · JPL
398427	2011 UC_{9}	—	September 28, 1997	Kitt Peak	Spacewatch	·	2.4 km	MPC · JPL
398428	2011 UZ_{14}	—	October 17, 2011	Kitt Peak	Spacewatch	WIT	1.2 km	MPC · JPL
398429	2011 UL_{16}	—	October 18, 2011	Mount Lemmon	Mount Lemmon Survey	EOS	2.4 km	MPC · JPL
398430	2011 UC_{18}	—	September 21, 2011	Kitt Peak	Spacewatch	WIT	860 m	MPC · JPL
398431	2011 UL_{22}	—	October 11, 2006	Kitt Peak	Spacewatch	·	2.0 km	MPC · JPL
398432	2011 UK_{25}	—	September 17, 2006	Kitt Peak	Spacewatch	·	1.7 km	MPC · JPL
398433	2011 UA_{27}	—	October 21, 2006	Mount Lemmon	Mount Lemmon Survey	·	1.6 km	MPC · JPL
398434	2011 UO_{28}	—	December 13, 2006	Mount Lemmon	Mount Lemmon Survey	·	2.7 km	MPC · JPL
398435	2011 US_{29}	—	April 11, 2005	Mount Lemmon	Mount Lemmon Survey	·	2.2 km	MPC · JPL
398436	2011 UR_{30}	—	October 9, 2005	Kitt Peak	Spacewatch	·	3.0 km	MPC · JPL
398437	2011 UC_{31}	—	December 24, 2006	Kitt Peak	Spacewatch	·	2.4 km	MPC · JPL
398438	2011 UA_{36}	—	November 5, 2007	Kitt Peak	Spacewatch	·	1.5 km	MPC · JPL
398439	2011 UZ_{37}	—	October 15, 1998	Kitt Peak	Spacewatch	·	1.9 km	MPC · JPL
398440	2011 UZ_{38}	—	October 20, 2011	Mount Lemmon	Mount Lemmon Survey	·	1.9 km	MPC · JPL
398441	2011 UD_{39}	—	September 19, 2006	Catalina	CSS	·	2.4 km	MPC · JPL
398442	2011 UZ_{47}	—	October 2, 1997	Kitt Peak	Spacewatch	·	1.9 km	MPC · JPL
398443	2011 UB_{48}	—	November 17, 2006	Kitt Peak	Spacewatch	EOS	1.7 km	MPC · JPL
398444	2011 UJ_{50}	—	October 18, 2011	Kitt Peak	Spacewatch	·	1.9 km	MPC · JPL
398445	2011 UQ_{50}	—	October 21, 1995	Kitt Peak	Spacewatch	·	2.5 km	MPC · JPL
398446	2011 UF_{51}	—	March 6, 2008	Mount Lemmon	Mount Lemmon Survey	·	2.2 km	MPC · JPL
398447	2011 UO_{52}	—	December 30, 2007	Mount Lemmon	Mount Lemmon Survey	·	1.6 km	MPC · JPL
398448	2011 UD_{54}	—	June 7, 2010	WISE	WISE	·	5.1 km	MPC · JPL
398449	2011 UK_{55}	—	September 29, 2005	Kitt Peak	Spacewatch	·	2.8 km	MPC · JPL
398450	2011 UN_{59}	—	October 4, 2007	Mount Lemmon	Mount Lemmon Survey	MAS	770 m	MPC · JPL
398451	2011 UC_{62}	—	November 4, 2010	Mount Lemmon	Mount Lemmon Survey	·	3.1 km	MPC · JPL
398452	2011 UM_{66}	—	March 1, 2009	Kitt Peak	Spacewatch	·	1.9 km	MPC · JPL
398453	2011 UL_{72}	—	March 14, 2010	Kitt Peak	Spacewatch	·	1.0 km	MPC · JPL
398454	2011 UV_{72}	—	October 18, 2011	Mount Lemmon	Mount Lemmon Survey	WIT	1.0 km	MPC · JPL
398455	2011 UP_{76}	—	December 13, 2006	Kitt Peak	Spacewatch	HYG	2.7 km	MPC · JPL
398456	2011 UT_{77}	—	October 19, 2011	Kitt Peak	Spacewatch	·	2.2 km	MPC · JPL
398457	2011 UT_{79}	—	October 6, 2011	Mount Lemmon	Mount Lemmon Survey	·	1.7 km	MPC · JPL
398458	2011 UC_{83}	—	October 27, 2005	Kitt Peak	Spacewatch	·	4.7 km	MPC · JPL
398459	2011 UJ_{86}	—	September 24, 2006	Kitt Peak	Spacewatch	·	3.3 km	MPC · JPL
398460	2011 UW_{88}	—	October 6, 2005	Kitt Peak	Spacewatch	·	3.2 km	MPC · JPL
398461	2011 UU_{98}	—	January 1, 2008	Kitt Peak	Spacewatch	·	2.2 km	MPC · JPL
398462	2011 UT_{101}	—	March 1, 2009	Kitt Peak	Spacewatch	·	1.6 km	MPC · JPL
398463	2011 UX_{101}	—	November 18, 2007	Mount Lemmon	Mount Lemmon Survey	(5)	1.2 km	MPC · JPL
398464	2011 UX_{104}	—	September 23, 2011	Kitt Peak	Spacewatch	·	2.5 km	MPC · JPL
398465	2011 UP_{108}	—	May 15, 2007	Mount Lemmon	Mount Lemmon Survey	·	1.1 km	MPC · JPL
398466	2011 US_{112}	—	September 23, 2011	Mount Lemmon	Mount Lemmon Survey	·	1.7 km	MPC · JPL
398467	2011 UM_{113}	—	December 3, 2007	Kitt Peak	Spacewatch	·	1.3 km	MPC · JPL
398468	2011 UA_{120}	—	August 21, 2006	Kitt Peak	Spacewatch	·	1.5 km	MPC · JPL
398469	2011 UJ_{120}	—	April 18, 2009	Siding Spring	SSS	·	4.5 km	MPC · JPL
398470	2011 UO_{120}	—	January 31, 2008	Catalina	CSS	·	2.2 km	MPC · JPL
398471	2011 UV_{120}	—	August 9, 2004	Anderson Mesa	LONEOS	·	710 m	MPC · JPL
398472	2011 UU_{122}	—	November 3, 2007	Kitt Peak	Spacewatch	·	1.7 km	MPC · JPL
398473	2011 UE_{124}	—	January 17, 2009	Kitt Peak	Spacewatch	·	1.3 km	MPC · JPL
398474	2011 UK_{127}	—	August 16, 2007	Andrushivka	Y. Ivaščenko	·	1.1 km	MPC · JPL
398475	2011 UR_{127}	—	November 18, 2006	Kitt Peak	Spacewatch	·	2.8 km	MPC · JPL
398476	2011 UM_{129}	—	September 25, 2000	Haleakala	NEAT	NYS	990 m	MPC · JPL
398477	2011 UA_{137}	—	October 21, 2006	Mount Lemmon	Mount Lemmon Survey	EOS	1.8 km	MPC · JPL
398478	2011 UT_{139}	—	August 29, 2005	Kitt Peak	Spacewatch	TIR	2.4 km	MPC · JPL
398479	2011 UE_{140}	—	February 1, 2009	Mount Lemmon	Mount Lemmon Survey	·	1.3 km	MPC · JPL
398480	2011 UR_{140}	—	October 23, 2011	Kitt Peak	Spacewatch	·	2.0 km	MPC · JPL
398481	2011 UZ_{140}	—	November 18, 2006	Kitt Peak	Spacewatch	·	3.3 km	MPC · JPL
398482	2011 UN_{142}	—	November 16, 2006	Kitt Peak	Spacewatch	EOS	1.9 km	MPC · JPL
398483	2011 UQ_{146}	—	December 13, 2006	Kitt Peak	Spacewatch	·	2.0 km	MPC · JPL
398484	2011 UY_{148}	—	September 11, 2007	Kitt Peak	Spacewatch	NYS	1.0 km	MPC · JPL
398485	2011 UW_{150}	—	April 20, 2010	Kitt Peak	Spacewatch	·	1.5 km	MPC · JPL
398486	2011 UH_{152}	—	June 15, 2010	Mount Lemmon	Mount Lemmon Survey	·	1.4 km	MPC · JPL
398487	2011 UJ_{153}	—	April 19, 2010	WISE	WISE	·	3.4 km	MPC · JPL
398488	2011 UP_{157}	—	November 24, 1995	Kitt Peak	Spacewatch	·	3.0 km	MPC · JPL
398489	2011 UQ_{157}	—	November 17, 2006	Kitt Peak	Spacewatch	·	1.9 km	MPC · JPL
398490	2011 UU_{157}	—	November 14, 2007	Kitt Peak	Spacewatch	HOF	2.6 km	MPC · JPL
398491	2011 UF_{162}	—	October 1, 2006	Kitt Peak	Spacewatch	·	2.1 km	MPC · JPL
398492	2011 UH_{164}	—	September 14, 2007	Catalina	CSS	·	1.2 km	MPC · JPL
398493	2011 UP_{176}	—	October 20, 2011	Mount Lemmon	Mount Lemmon Survey	·	2.4 km	MPC · JPL
398494	2011 UQ_{176}	—	September 15, 2006	Kitt Peak	Spacewatch	·	2.0 km	MPC · JPL
398495	2011 UT_{177}	—	November 8, 2007	Kitt Peak	Spacewatch	·	1.5 km	MPC · JPL
398496	2011 UF_{179}	—	December 16, 2006	Kitt Peak	Spacewatch	·	3.9 km	MPC · JPL
398497	2011 UF_{180}	—	October 24, 2011	Kitt Peak	Spacewatch	·	1.9 km	MPC · JPL
398498	2011 UX_{180}	—	April 11, 2005	Kitt Peak	Spacewatch	·	1.5 km	MPC · JPL
398499	2011 UK_{187}	—	December 5, 2002	Socorro	LINEAR	GEF	1.1 km	MPC · JPL
398500	2011 UN_{187}	—	April 24, 2010	WISE	WISE	·	5.0 km	MPC · JPL

== 398501–398600 ==
back to top

Designation			Discovery			Properties		Ref
Permanent	Provisional	Named after	Date	Site	Discoverer(s)	Category	Diam.	Ref
398501	2011 UR_{191}	—	August 27, 2006	Anderson Mesa	LONEOS	·	2.2 km	MPC · JPL
398502	2011 UX_{196}	—	October 20, 2006	Mount Lemmon	Mount Lemmon Survey	·	2.5 km	MPC · JPL
398503	2011 UQ_{201}	—	May 26, 2006	Mount Lemmon	Mount Lemmon Survey	·	1.3 km	MPC · JPL
398504	2011 UK_{202}	—	May 8, 2005	Mount Lemmon	Mount Lemmon Survey	·	1.6 km	MPC · JPL
398505	2011 UD_{231}	—	November 18, 2006	Mount Lemmon	Mount Lemmon Survey	·	2.3 km	MPC · JPL
398506	2011 US_{233}	—	October 16, 2007	Mount Lemmon	Mount Lemmon Survey	·	1.2 km	MPC · JPL
398507	2011 UG_{240}	—	September 12, 1998	Kitt Peak	Spacewatch	·	1.3 km	MPC · JPL
398508	2011 UF_{242}	—	May 7, 2010	WISE	WISE	·	2.8 km	MPC · JPL
398509	2011 UV_{243}	—	November 15, 2006	Kitt Peak	Spacewatch	KOR	1.3 km	MPC · JPL
398510	2011 UY_{245}	—	December 14, 2007	Mount Lemmon	Mount Lemmon Survey	AGN	1.2 km	MPC · JPL
398511	2011 UF_{248}	—	September 3, 2010	Mount Lemmon	Mount Lemmon Survey	EOS	1.9 km	MPC · JPL
398512	2011 UD_{251}	—	March 8, 2008	Kitt Peak	Spacewatch	EOS	2.1 km	MPC · JPL
398513	2011 UD_{253}	—	October 3, 2006	Mount Lemmon	Mount Lemmon Survey	·	1.9 km	MPC · JPL
398514	2011 UN_{257}	—	October 23, 2011	Kitt Peak	Spacewatch	·	3.1 km	MPC · JPL
398515	2011 UM_{259}	—	October 23, 2011	Kitt Peak	Spacewatch	TEL	1.4 km	MPC · JPL
398516	2011 UO_{263}	—	November 16, 2006	Kitt Peak	Spacewatch	EOS	1.7 km	MPC · JPL
398517	2011 UQ_{264}	—	October 10, 2007	Kitt Peak	Spacewatch	·	800 m	MPC · JPL
398518	2011 UE_{265}	—	October 14, 2007	Mount Lemmon	Mount Lemmon Survey	EUN	1.1 km	MPC · JPL
398519	2011 UF_{268}	—	December 9, 2006	Kitt Peak	Spacewatch	·	2.7 km	MPC · JPL
398520	2011 UD_{271}	—	September 22, 2006	Catalina	CSS	BRA	1.7 km	MPC · JPL
398521	2011 UU_{278}	—	October 2, 2006	Mount Lemmon	Mount Lemmon Survey	·	1.7 km	MPC · JPL
398522	2011 UZ_{286}	—	August 29, 2006	Kitt Peak	Spacewatch	NEM	2.1 km	MPC · JPL
398523	2011 UD_{288}	—	December 15, 2007	Kitt Peak	Spacewatch	·	2.3 km	MPC · JPL
398524	2011 UF_{292}	—	May 17, 2005	Mount Lemmon	Mount Lemmon Survey	·	1.7 km	MPC · JPL
398525	2011 UA_{294}	—	October 11, 2007	Catalina	CSS	V	810 m	MPC · JPL
398526	2011 UC_{294}	—	March 2, 2009	Mount Lemmon	Mount Lemmon Survey	·	1.6 km	MPC · JPL
398527	2011 UM_{296}	—	April 18, 2009	Mount Lemmon	Mount Lemmon Survey	·	2.0 km	MPC · JPL
398528	2011 UU_{296}	—	October 4, 2007	Catalina	CSS	MAS	670 m	MPC · JPL
398529	2011 UO_{299}	—	October 19, 2006	Mount Lemmon	Mount Lemmon Survey	·	1.6 km	MPC · JPL
398530	2011 UQ_{299}	—	May 3, 2005	Kitt Peak	Spacewatch	·	2.0 km	MPC · JPL
398531	2011 UB_{302}	—	June 6, 2005	Kitt Peak	Spacewatch	·	2.2 km	MPC · JPL
398532	2011 UL_{306}	—	October 23, 2011	Mount Lemmon	Mount Lemmon Survey	·	2.8 km	MPC · JPL
398533	2011 UG_{307}	—	December 6, 2007	Kitt Peak	Spacewatch	·	2.1 km	MPC · JPL
398534	2011 UP_{309}	—	April 9, 2010	Mount Lemmon	Mount Lemmon Survey	EUN	1.2 km	MPC · JPL
398535	2011 UV_{309}	—	May 4, 2005	Mount Lemmon	Mount Lemmon Survey	·	1.7 km	MPC · JPL
398536	2011 UJ_{314}	—	November 28, 2000	Kitt Peak	Spacewatch	·	2.4 km	MPC · JPL
398537	2011 UY_{316}	—	December 18, 2007	Mount Lemmon	Mount Lemmon Survey	HOF	2.4 km	MPC · JPL
398538	2011 UA_{318}	—	December 17, 2007	Kitt Peak	Spacewatch	·	1.8 km	MPC · JPL
398539	2011 UL_{319}	—	October 26, 2005	Kitt Peak	Spacewatch	LUT	4.5 km	MPC · JPL
398540	2011 UE_{322}	—	September 6, 2007	Siding Spring	SSS	·	1.4 km	MPC · JPL
398541	2011 US_{322}	—	November 14, 1998	Socorro	LINEAR	·	4.9 km	MPC · JPL
398542	2011 UR_{323}	—	January 19, 2004	Kitt Peak	Spacewatch	·	1.6 km	MPC · JPL
398543	2011 UY_{326}	—	May 25, 2010	WISE	WISE	EOS	2.3 km	MPC · JPL
398544	2011 UB_{337}	—	August 13, 2007	XuYi	PMO NEO Survey Program	·	1.1 km	MPC · JPL
398545	2011 US_{337}	—	August 19, 2006	Kitt Peak	Spacewatch	·	2.1 km	MPC · JPL
398546	2011 UA_{338}	—	April 16, 2010	WISE	WISE	·	2.8 km	MPC · JPL
398547	2011 UQ_{338}	—	August 11, 2007	Siding Spring	SSS	·	1.4 km	MPC · JPL
398548	2011 UQ_{342}	—	October 23, 1995	Kitt Peak	Spacewatch	EOS	1.9 km	MPC · JPL
398549	2011 UO_{347}	—	October 20, 2007	Mount Lemmon	Mount Lemmon Survey	·	1.1 km	MPC · JPL
398550	2011 UP_{364}	—	March 1, 2009	Kitt Peak	Spacewatch	NEM	2.4 km	MPC · JPL
398551	2011 US_{375}	—	June 17, 2005	Mount Lemmon	Mount Lemmon Survey	·	2.6 km	MPC · JPL
398552	2011 US_{377}	—	December 4, 2007	Kitt Peak	Spacewatch	·	1.7 km	MPC · JPL
398553	2011 US_{386}	—	May 12, 1996	Kitt Peak	Spacewatch	·	2.2 km	MPC · JPL
398554	2011 UC_{388}	—	May 22, 2010	WISE	WISE	·	4.2 km	MPC · JPL
398555	2011 UJ_{389}	—	February 27, 2006	Mount Lemmon	Mount Lemmon Survey	V	690 m	MPC · JPL
398556	2011 UV_{391}	—	March 29, 2009	Mount Lemmon	Mount Lemmon Survey	·	1.6 km	MPC · JPL
398557	2011 UE_{399}	—	November 5, 2007	Mount Lemmon	Mount Lemmon Survey	HOF	2.6 km	MPC · JPL
398558	2011 UK_{400}	—	April 15, 2008	Mount Lemmon	Mount Lemmon Survey	TIR	2.9 km	MPC · JPL
398559	2011 UB_{401}	—	June 14, 2005	Kitt Peak	Spacewatch	·	2.4 km	MPC · JPL
398560	2011 VM_{10}	—	April 10, 2008	Kitt Peak	Spacewatch	·	2.9 km	MPC · JPL
398561	2011 VC_{11}	—	September 28, 2011	Mount Lemmon	Mount Lemmon Survey	·	1.7 km	MPC · JPL
398562	2011 VE_{14}	—	October 23, 2006	Mount Lemmon	Mount Lemmon Survey	EOS	1.6 km	MPC · JPL
398563	2011 VQ_{14}	—	September 11, 2007	Catalina	CSS	·	1.3 km	MPC · JPL
398564	2011 VT_{15}	—	September 30, 2006	Mount Lemmon	Mount Lemmon Survey	·	1.7 km	MPC · JPL
398565	2011 VL_{21}	—	May 26, 2010	WISE	WISE	·	2.7 km	MPC · JPL
398566	2011 WV_{5}	—	November 5, 2007	Kitt Peak	Spacewatch	·	1.6 km	MPC · JPL
398567	2011 WT_{8}	—	November 14, 2007	Kitt Peak	Spacewatch	·	1.4 km	MPC · JPL
398568	2011 WR_{12}	—	September 3, 2010	Mount Lemmon	Mount Lemmon Survey	·	2.8 km	MPC · JPL
398569	2011 WW_{14}	—	September 25, 1973	Palomar	C. J. van Houten, I. van Houten-Groeneveld, T. Gehrels	·	1.5 km	MPC · JPL
398570	2011 WZ_{15}	—	November 19, 2000	Kitt Peak	Spacewatch	·	3.6 km	MPC · JPL
398571	2011 WN_{17}	—	June 23, 2007	Siding Spring	SSS	·	900 m	MPC · JPL
398572	2011 WW_{34}	—	January 18, 2008	Mount Lemmon	Mount Lemmon Survey	·	2.1 km	MPC · JPL
398573	2011 WP_{35}	—	September 13, 2007	Mount Lemmon	Mount Lemmon Survey	V	730 m	MPC · JPL
398574	2011 WZ_{38}	—	July 21, 2006	Mount Lemmon	Mount Lemmon Survey	·	1.9 km	MPC · JPL
398575	2011 WP_{43}	—	May 15, 2005	Mount Lemmon	Mount Lemmon Survey	·	2.2 km	MPC · JPL
398576	2011 WT_{44}	—	May 6, 2006	Mount Lemmon	Mount Lemmon Survey	·	1.3 km	MPC · JPL
398577	2011 WK_{45}	—	January 10, 2006	Kitt Peak	Spacewatch	·	970 m	MPC · JPL
398578	2011 WX_{47}	—	February 15, 2007	Catalina	CSS	·	4.5 km	MPC · JPL
398579	2011 WJ_{49}	—	March 31, 2008	Mount Lemmon	Mount Lemmon Survey	·	2.3 km	MPC · JPL
398580	2011 WG_{53}	—	December 27, 2006	Mount Lemmon	Mount Lemmon Survey	EOS	1.8 km	MPC · JPL
398581	2011 WM_{56}	—	October 22, 2006	Catalina	CSS	·	1.7 km	MPC · JPL
398582	2011 WV_{56}	—	December 15, 2006	Kitt Peak	Spacewatch	EOS	2.0 km	MPC · JPL
398583	2011 WX_{62}	—	September 26, 2005	Catalina	CSS	·	3.4 km	MPC · JPL
398584	2011 WF_{64}	—	September 11, 2010	Mount Lemmon	Mount Lemmon Survey	VER	3.1 km	MPC · JPL
398585	2011 WM_{64}	—	November 18, 2011	Mount Lemmon	Mount Lemmon Survey	·	2.9 km	MPC · JPL
398586	2011 WU_{64}	—	April 11, 2008	Kitt Peak	Spacewatch	·	3.6 km	MPC · JPL
398587	2011 WR_{66}	—	November 2, 2007	Mount Lemmon	Mount Lemmon Survey	·	2.0 km	MPC · JPL
398588	2011 WQ_{70}	—	May 20, 2006	Mount Lemmon	Mount Lemmon Survey	·	1.1 km	MPC · JPL
398589	2011 WR_{70}	—	November 2, 2005	Mount Lemmon	Mount Lemmon Survey	·	3.8 km	MPC · JPL
398590	2011 WS_{71}	—	September 20, 2006	Catalina	CSS	·	2.2 km	MPC · JPL
398591	2011 WN_{81}	—	September 15, 2006	Kitt Peak	Spacewatch	AGN	1.1 km	MPC · JPL
398592	2011 WG_{82}	—	May 4, 2009	Mount Lemmon	Mount Lemmon Survey	·	3.4 km	MPC · JPL
398593	2011 WS_{86}	—	September 18, 2006	Kitt Peak	Spacewatch	·	2.5 km	MPC · JPL
398594	2011 WQ_{90}	—	April 23, 2009	Kitt Peak	Spacewatch	EOS	2.1 km	MPC · JPL
398595	2011 WY_{91}	—	October 8, 2005	Catalina	CSS	·	3.6 km	MPC · JPL
398596	2011 WM_{95}	—	May 26, 2010	WISE	WISE	·	4.0 km	MPC · JPL
398597	2011 WD_{97}	—	September 14, 2005	Kitt Peak	Spacewatch	·	2.2 km	MPC · JPL
398598	2011 WG_{98}	—	October 3, 2005	Catalina	CSS	EOS	2.3 km	MPC · JPL
398599	2011 WC_{102}	—	March 4, 2005	Mount Lemmon	Mount Lemmon Survey	·	1.6 km	MPC · JPL
398600	2011 WK_{104}	—	May 2, 2010	WISE	WISE	·	2.8 km	MPC · JPL

== 398601–398700 ==
back to top

Designation			Discovery			Properties		Ref
Permanent	Provisional	Named after	Date	Site	Discoverer(s)	Category	Diam.	Ref
398601	2011 WR_{106}	—	January 14, 1996	Kitt Peak	Spacewatch	·	2.8 km	MPC · JPL
398602	2011 WJ_{108}	—	November 22, 2006	Mount Lemmon	Mount Lemmon Survey	EOS	2.3 km	MPC · JPL
398603	2011 WD_{112}	—	October 6, 1996	Kitt Peak	Spacewatch	KOR	1.3 km	MPC · JPL
398604	2011 WH_{116}	—	September 17, 2006	Kitt Peak	Spacewatch	·	2.1 km	MPC · JPL
398605	2011 WQ_{117}	—	November 20, 2000	Socorro	LINEAR	·	6.1 km	MPC · JPL
398606	2011 WO_{118}	—	September 16, 2006	Catalina	CSS	·	2.4 km	MPC · JPL
398607	2011 WL_{130}	—	October 8, 2007	Mount Lemmon	Mount Lemmon Survey	·	1.5 km	MPC · JPL
398608	2011 WJ_{131}	—	February 8, 2002	Kitt Peak	Spacewatch	·	3.0 km	MPC · JPL
398609	2011 WK_{143}	—	October 4, 2006	Mount Lemmon	Mount Lemmon Survey	·	2.0 km	MPC · JPL
398610	2011 WF_{146}	—	December 17, 2007	Kitt Peak	Spacewatch	·	1.6 km	MPC · JPL
398611	2011 WK_{149}	—	September 1, 2005	Kitt Peak	Spacewatch	·	1.7 km	MPC · JPL
398612	2011 WJ_{150}	—	September 24, 2005	Kitt Peak	Spacewatch	·	2.9 km	MPC · JPL
398613	2011 XU_{3}	—	December 15, 2006	Mount Lemmon	Mount Lemmon Survey	VER	2.9 km	MPC · JPL
398614	2011 XD_{4}	—	November 20, 2006	Kitt Peak	Spacewatch	·	2.3 km	MPC · JPL
398615	2011 YZ_{2}	—	November 25, 2005	Catalina	CSS	·	3.6 km	MPC · JPL
398616	2011 YB_{3}	—	November 3, 2010	Mount Lemmon	Mount Lemmon Survey	L4 · ERY	9.3 km	MPC · JPL
398617	2011 YB_{20}	—	December 4, 2007	Kitt Peak	Spacewatch	MAS	910 m	MPC · JPL
398618	2011 YW_{23}	—	August 5, 2005	Siding Spring	SSS	·	2.4 km	MPC · JPL
398619	2011 YC_{38}	—	July 11, 2010	WISE	WISE	·	4.0 km	MPC · JPL
398620	2011 YW_{42}	—	October 29, 2005	Mount Lemmon	Mount Lemmon Survey	·	3.5 km	MPC · JPL
398621	2011 YW_{45}	—	December 5, 2005	Kitt Peak	Spacewatch	·	4.2 km	MPC · JPL
398622	2011 YE_{48}	—	November 18, 2006	Kitt Peak	Spacewatch	EOS	2.1 km	MPC · JPL
398623	2011 YC_{49}	—	May 8, 2008	Kitt Peak	Spacewatch	·	4.9 km	MPC · JPL
398624	2011 YP_{59}	—	April 16, 2008	Mount Lemmon	Mount Lemmon Survey	·	4.1 km	MPC · JPL
398625	2011 YZ_{70}	—	May 15, 2008	Mount Lemmon	Mount Lemmon Survey	ELF	4.1 km	MPC · JPL
398626	2011 YB_{78}	—	February 18, 2008	Mount Lemmon	Mount Lemmon Survey	EOS	2.3 km	MPC · JPL
398627	2012 BZ_{8}	—	December 7, 2005	Kitt Peak	Spacewatch	·	3.2 km	MPC · JPL
398628	2012 BH_{57}	—	November 4, 2005	Mount Lemmon	Mount Lemmon Survey	HYG	2.0 km	MPC · JPL
398629	2012 BX_{117}	—	October 30, 2010	Catalina	CSS	·	3.6 km	MPC · JPL
398630	2012 BP_{144}	—	June 27, 2010	WISE	WISE	·	4.4 km	MPC · JPL
398631	2012 BH_{149}	—	November 13, 2006	Mount Lemmon	Mount Lemmon Survey	·	1.9 km	MPC · JPL
398632	2012 CL_{25}	—	December 30, 2005	Kitt Peak	Spacewatch	·	2.5 km	MPC · JPL
398633	2012 CH_{26}	—	September 4, 1999	Kitt Peak	Spacewatch	·	2.3 km	MPC · JPL
398634	2012 DO_{77}	—	February 19, 2012	Kitt Peak	Spacewatch	·	1.6 km	MPC · JPL
398635	2012 FW_{6}	—	September 28, 2009	Kitt Peak	Spacewatch	·	3.9 km	MPC · JPL
398636	2012 FQ_{48}	—	September 29, 2009	Mount Lemmon	Mount Lemmon Survey	EOS	2.3 km	MPC · JPL
398637	2012 LB_{11}	—	November 24, 2006	Mount Lemmon	Mount Lemmon Survey	PHO	1.1 km	MPC · JPL
398638	2012 QD_{17}	—	February 17, 2004	Socorro	LINEAR	H	460 m	MPC · JPL
398639	2012 QP_{31}	—	August 10, 2012	Kitt Peak	Spacewatch	·	2.7 km	MPC · JPL
398640	2012 QZ_{39}	—	December 14, 2010	Mount Lemmon	Mount Lemmon Survey	H	710 m	MPC · JPL
398641	2012 RP_{31}	—	July 29, 2009	Kitt Peak	Spacewatch	·	1.2 km	MPC · JPL
398642	2012 RX_{33}	—	March 15, 2004	Kitt Peak	Spacewatch	·	500 m	MPC · JPL
398643	2012 SH_{15}	—	May 28, 2011	Mount Lemmon	Mount Lemmon Survey	·	700 m	MPC · JPL
398644	2012 SU_{62}	—	November 18, 2009	Mount Lemmon	Mount Lemmon Survey	·	980 m	MPC · JPL
398645	2012 TT_{13}	—	November 29, 2008	Siding Spring	SSS	·	1.6 km	MPC · JPL
398646	2012 TA_{15}	—	April 23, 2009	Mount Lemmon	Mount Lemmon Survey	H	500 m	MPC · JPL
398647	2012 TD_{26}	—	March 13, 2010	Kitt Peak	Spacewatch	BAR	1.5 km	MPC · JPL
398648	2012 TT_{52}	—	March 27, 2003	Kitt Peak	Spacewatch	H	680 m	MPC · JPL
398649	2012 TH_{58}	—	March 13, 2007	Mount Lemmon	Mount Lemmon Survey	·	1.0 km	MPC · JPL
398650	2012 TR_{67}	—	October 1, 2003	Kitt Peak	Spacewatch	·	2.2 km	MPC · JPL
398651	2012 TL_{71}	—	March 17, 2005	Kitt Peak	Spacewatch	·	1.9 km	MPC · JPL
398652	2012 TH_{162}	—	April 18, 2007	Mount Lemmon	Mount Lemmon Survey	·	650 m	MPC · JPL
398653	2012 TX_{246}	—	December 16, 2009	Mount Lemmon	Mount Lemmon Survey	·	960 m	MPC · JPL
398654	2012 TV_{252}	—	December 15, 2006	Kitt Peak	Spacewatch	·	720 m	MPC · JPL
398655	2012 TT_{294}	—	April 19, 2006	Mount Lemmon	Mount Lemmon Survey	(5)	1.1 km	MPC · JPL
398656	2012 UQ_{25}	—	November 28, 2005	Socorro	LINEAR	·	1.5 km	MPC · JPL
398657	2012 UL_{42}	—	April 2, 2006	Kitt Peak	Spacewatch	H	550 m	MPC · JPL
398658	2012 UA_{44}	—	December 7, 2008	Mount Lemmon	Mount Lemmon Survey	·	1.7 km	MPC · JPL
398659	2012 UM_{45}	—	October 23, 2003	Kitt Peak	Spacewatch	·	2.0 km	MPC · JPL
398660	2012 UQ_{48}	—	May 31, 2011	Kitt Peak	Spacewatch	·	790 m	MPC · JPL
398661	2012 UL_{52}	—	January 15, 1996	Kitt Peak	Spacewatch	·	1.7 km	MPC · JPL
398662	2012 UJ_{79}	—	October 20, 2001	Socorro	LINEAR	·	2.8 km	MPC · JPL
398663	2012 UY_{86}	—	January 16, 2005	Kitt Peak	Spacewatch	·	1.3 km	MPC · JPL
398664	2012 UF_{90}	—	November 22, 2008	Kitt Peak	Spacewatch	·	1.1 km	MPC · JPL
398665	2012 US_{138}	—	April 28, 2003	Anderson Mesa	LONEOS	H	650 m	MPC · JPL
398666	2012 UC_{141}	—	January 28, 2007	Mount Lemmon	Mount Lemmon Survey	·	1.1 km	MPC · JPL
398667	2012 UO_{146}	—	May 19, 2006	Mount Lemmon	Mount Lemmon Survey	EUN	1.3 km	MPC · JPL
398668	2012 UB_{173}	—	November 7, 2007	Mount Lemmon	Mount Lemmon Survey	·	3.6 km	MPC · JPL
398669	2012 UH_{174}	—	December 5, 2007	Catalina	CSS	H	700 m	MPC · JPL
398670	2012 VP_{5}	—	June 3, 2003	Kitt Peak	Spacewatch	H	690 m	MPC · JPL
398671	2012 VA_{24}	—	October 25, 2005	Mount Lemmon	Mount Lemmon Survey	·	1.2 km	MPC · JPL
398672	2012 VK_{28}	—	September 19, 2012	Mount Lemmon	Mount Lemmon Survey	·	600 m	MPC · JPL
398673	2012 VA_{36}	—	March 19, 2010	Kitt Peak	Spacewatch	·	2.0 km	MPC · JPL
398674	2012 VW_{41}	—	November 19, 2001	Socorro	LINEAR	·	1.4 km	MPC · JPL
398675	2012 VD_{46}	—	August 29, 2005	Kitt Peak	Spacewatch	·	690 m	MPC · JPL
398676	2012 VY_{51}	—	November 3, 2008	Mount Lemmon	Mount Lemmon Survey	·	1.5 km	MPC · JPL
398677	2012 VE_{60}	—	October 25, 2005	Mount Lemmon	Mount Lemmon Survey	·	1.2 km	MPC · JPL
398678	2012 VS_{65}	—	January 18, 2008	Mount Lemmon	Mount Lemmon Survey	·	3.6 km	MPC · JPL
398679	2012 VZ_{66}	—	December 1, 2005	Kitt Peak	Spacewatch	·	1.0 km	MPC · JPL
398680	2012 VW_{71}	—	November 21, 2008	Kitt Peak	Spacewatch	·	1.6 km	MPC · JPL
398681	2012 VK_{78}	—	October 8, 2008	Mount Lemmon	Mount Lemmon Survey	·	1.2 km	MPC · JPL
398682	2012 VQ_{85}	—	November 25, 2005	Kitt Peak	Spacewatch	MAS	590 m	MPC · JPL
398683	2012 VM_{88}	—	December 19, 2007	Mount Lemmon	Mount Lemmon Survey	HYG	2.5 km	MPC · JPL
398684	2012 VS_{90}	—	March 11, 2007	Mount Lemmon	Mount Lemmon Survey	·	500 m	MPC · JPL
398685	2012 VW_{90}	—	December 3, 2004	Kitt Peak	Spacewatch	·	940 m	MPC · JPL
398686	2012 VK_{100}	—	November 17, 2009	Mount Lemmon	Mount Lemmon Survey	·	670 m	MPC · JPL
398687	2012 WB	—	May 4, 2006	Kitt Peak	Spacewatch	H	470 m	MPC · JPL
398688	2012 WV_{6}	—	October 3, 2008	Kitt Peak	Spacewatch	·	2.0 km	MPC · JPL
398689	2012 WJ_{11}	—	December 20, 2006	Mount Lemmon	Mount Lemmon Survey	·	680 m	MPC · JPL
398690	2012 WV_{11}	—	June 4, 2003	Kitt Peak	Spacewatch	PHO	2.6 km	MPC · JPL
398691	2012 WF_{14}	—	December 30, 2005	Kitt Peak	Spacewatch	·	1.4 km	MPC · JPL
398692	2012 WF_{21}	—	October 16, 2003	Kitt Peak	Spacewatch	·	2.5 km	MPC · JPL
398693	2012 WW_{25}	—	October 25, 2005	Kitt Peak	Spacewatch	·	690 m	MPC · JPL
398694	2012 WZ_{28}	—	November 8, 2007	Kitt Peak	Spacewatch	·	2.5 km	MPC · JPL
398695	2012 WS_{34}	—	December 11, 2004	Kitt Peak	Spacewatch	·	1.4 km	MPC · JPL
398696	2012 WD_{35}	—	September 3, 2008	Kitt Peak	Spacewatch	·	950 m	MPC · JPL
398697	2012 XF_{10}	—	April 26, 2003	Kitt Peak	Spacewatch	NYS	1.2 km	MPC · JPL
398698	2012 XW_{19}	—	October 23, 2012	Mount Lemmon	Mount Lemmon Survey	(5)	1.2 km	MPC · JPL
398699	2012 XQ_{24}	—	October 14, 2012	Kitt Peak	Spacewatch	·	2.3 km	MPC · JPL
398700	2012 XU_{27}	—	November 1, 2008	Mount Lemmon	Mount Lemmon Survey	EUN	1.4 km	MPC · JPL

== 398701–398800 ==
back to top

Designation			Discovery			Properties		Ref
Permanent	Provisional	Named after	Date	Site	Discoverer(s)	Category	Diam.	Ref
398701	2012 XX_{29}	—	June 30, 2005	Kitt Peak	Spacewatch	·	810 m	MPC · JPL
398702	2012 XN_{31}	—	March 16, 2007	Mount Lemmon	Mount Lemmon Survey	·	810 m	MPC · JPL
398703	2012 XM_{41}	—	March 10, 2003	Anderson Mesa	LONEOS	(2076)	950 m	MPC · JPL
398704	2012 XX_{44}	—	February 1, 1997	Kitt Peak	Spacewatch	·	1.1 km	MPC · JPL
398705	2012 XM_{46}	—	June 14, 2010	WISE	WISE	·	4.1 km	MPC · JPL
398706	2012 XP_{46}	—	March 21, 2010	Catalina	CSS	PHO	2.0 km	MPC · JPL
398707	2012 XF_{50}	—	December 16, 2007	Kitt Peak	Spacewatch	EOS	2.1 km	MPC · JPL
398708	2012 XD_{53}	—	January 13, 2008	Kitt Peak	Spacewatch	·	2.8 km	MPC · JPL
398709	2012 XL_{53}	—	December 27, 1999	Kitt Peak	Spacewatch	(5) · fast	1.4 km	MPC · JPL
398710	2012 XA_{57}	—	November 3, 2008	Kitt Peak	Spacewatch	·	800 m	MPC · JPL
398711	2012 XB_{57}	—	December 4, 2005	Kitt Peak	Spacewatch	·	880 m	MPC · JPL
398712	2012 XQ_{57}	—	April 12, 2004	Kitt Peak	Spacewatch	·	800 m	MPC · JPL
398713	2012 XR_{59}	—	May 8, 2010	Mount Lemmon	Mount Lemmon Survey	·	1.5 km	MPC · JPL
398714	2012 XR_{60}	—	September 22, 2008	Kitt Peak	Spacewatch	·	1.3 km	MPC · JPL
398715	2012 XA_{66}	—	April 2, 2006	Kitt Peak	Spacewatch	V	650 m	MPC · JPL
398716	2012 XD_{67}	—	November 26, 2012	Mount Lemmon	Mount Lemmon Survey	·	1.3 km	MPC · JPL
398717	2012 XT_{84}	—	September 19, 2006	Kitt Peak	Spacewatch	·	2.2 km	MPC · JPL
398718	2012 XV_{96}	—	March 15, 2001	Kitt Peak	Spacewatch	·	790 m	MPC · JPL
398719	2012 XS_{101}	—	March 21, 2009	Catalina	CSS	·	2.4 km	MPC · JPL
398720	2012 XK_{105}	—	December 10, 2005	Kitt Peak	Spacewatch	·	800 m	MPC · JPL
398721	2012 XM_{106}	—	December 18, 2007	Mount Lemmon	Mount Lemmon Survey	·	2.6 km	MPC · JPL
398722	2012 XQ_{107}	—	September 24, 2008	Mount Lemmon	Mount Lemmon Survey	·	1.3 km	MPC · JPL
398723	2012 XT_{114}	—	February 1, 2009	Catalina	CSS	fast	1.5 km	MPC · JPL
398724	2012 XX_{114}	—	March 14, 2007	Mount Lemmon	Mount Lemmon Survey	·	750 m	MPC · JPL
398725	2012 XG_{116}	—	October 30, 2005	Kitt Peak	Spacewatch	·	1 km	MPC · JPL
398726	2012 XF_{117}	—	December 29, 2008	Mount Lemmon	Mount Lemmon Survey	·	1.4 km	MPC · JPL
398727	2012 XM_{119}	—	November 18, 2008	Kitt Peak	Spacewatch	·	1.5 km	MPC · JPL
398728	2012 XW_{119}	—	January 18, 2005	Kitt Peak	Spacewatch	·	1.5 km	MPC · JPL
398729	2012 XL_{124}	—	May 1, 2009	Mount Lemmon	Mount Lemmon Survey	·	2.1 km	MPC · JPL
398730	2012 XH_{130}	—	November 21, 2005	Anderson Mesa	LONEOS	·	800 m	MPC · JPL
398731	2012 XR_{136}	—	November 10, 2005	Mount Lemmon	Mount Lemmon Survey	PHO	960 m	MPC · JPL
398732	2012 XG_{137}	—	September 14, 2006	Kitt Peak	Spacewatch	·	2.4 km	MPC · JPL
398733	2012 XT_{138}	—	October 22, 2003	Kitt Peak	Spacewatch	MAR	1.2 km	MPC · JPL
398734	2012 XS_{142}	—	March 31, 2001	Kitt Peak	Spacewatch	·	2.3 km	MPC · JPL
398735	2012 XS_{144}	—	April 18, 2009	Mount Lemmon	Mount Lemmon Survey	·	1.8 km	MPC · JPL
398736	2012 XC_{145}	—	December 9, 2001	Socorro	LINEAR	H	890 m	MPC · JPL
398737	2012 XR_{151}	—	September 3, 2008	Kitt Peak	Spacewatch	·	810 m	MPC · JPL
398738	2012 YA_{2}	—	November 11, 2007	Mount Lemmon	Mount Lemmon Survey	·	2.1 km	MPC · JPL
398739	2012 YM_{4}	—	February 4, 2009	Mount Lemmon	Mount Lemmon Survey	AGN	1.2 km	MPC · JPL
398740	2012 YN_{8}	—	October 17, 2010	Mount Lemmon	Mount Lemmon Survey	L4	8.9 km	MPC · JPL
398741	2013 AD_{6}	—	March 13, 2007	Catalina	CSS	·	890 m	MPC · JPL
398742	2013 AN_{8}	—	December 12, 1999	Kitt Peak	Spacewatch	HNS	1.3 km	MPC · JPL
398743	2013 AC_{11}	—	December 21, 2008	Catalina	CSS	·	1.6 km	MPC · JPL
398744	2013 AA_{12}	—	April 22, 2004	Kitt Peak	Spacewatch	·	890 m	MPC · JPL
398745	2013 AX_{20}	—	December 29, 2008	Mount Lemmon	Mount Lemmon Survey	·	1.9 km	MPC · JPL
398746	2013 AE_{24}	—	December 27, 2005	Kitt Peak	Spacewatch	MAS	740 m	MPC · JPL
398747	2013 AO_{24}	—	June 22, 2010	WISE	WISE	·	1.3 km	MPC · JPL
398748	2013 AW_{24}	—	March 13, 2002	Socorro	LINEAR	MAS	1.0 km	MPC · JPL
398749	2013 AX_{29}	—	December 14, 2001	Kitt Peak	Spacewatch	·	2.5 km	MPC · JPL
398750	2013 AP_{31}	—	November 2, 2006	Mount Lemmon	Mount Lemmon Survey	·	3.0 km	MPC · JPL
398751	2013 AY_{35}	—	November 23, 2008	Mount Lemmon	Mount Lemmon Survey	·	1.7 km	MPC · JPL
398752	2013 AC_{38}	—	February 26, 2009	Kitt Peak	Spacewatch	·	1.5 km	MPC · JPL
398753	2013 AG_{39}	—	September 28, 2009	Mount Lemmon	Mount Lemmon Survey	L4	8.6 km	MPC · JPL
398754	2013 AH_{39}	—	January 5, 2013	Kitt Peak	Spacewatch	·	870 m	MPC · JPL
398755	2013 AT_{39}	—	November 3, 2007	Kitt Peak	Spacewatch	·	1.7 km	MPC · JPL
398756	2013 AX_{39}	—	March 3, 2009	Catalina	CSS	EUN	1.4 km	MPC · JPL
398757	2013 AW_{40}	—	October 7, 2008	Mount Lemmon	Mount Lemmon Survey	·	750 m	MPC · JPL
398758	2013 AW_{41}	—	May 9, 2005	Mount Lemmon	Mount Lemmon Survey	·	1.6 km	MPC · JPL
398759	2013 AG_{42}	—	January 31, 2009	Mount Lemmon	Mount Lemmon Survey	·	1.4 km	MPC · JPL
398760	2013 AC_{43}	—	September 12, 2007	Kitt Peak	Spacewatch	·	1.0 km	MPC · JPL
398761	2013 AC_{55}	—	October 23, 2011	Mount Lemmon	Mount Lemmon Survey	·	2.4 km	MPC · JPL
398762	2013 AB_{58}	—	September 29, 2011	Mount Lemmon	Mount Lemmon Survey	·	1.8 km	MPC · JPL
398763	2013 AE_{71}	—	September 23, 2011	Kitt Peak	Spacewatch	·	2.5 km	MPC · JPL
398764	2013 AF_{73}	—	December 2, 2008	Kitt Peak	Spacewatch	·	1.7 km	MPC · JPL
398765	2013 AZ_{73}	—	April 10, 2005	Mount Lemmon	Mount Lemmon Survey	·	2.0 km	MPC · JPL
398766	2013 AS_{74}	—	February 14, 2009	Catalina	CSS	(5)	1.8 km	MPC · JPL
398767	2013 AO_{80}	—	April 21, 2009	Mount Lemmon	Mount Lemmon Survey	·	2.1 km	MPC · JPL
398768	2013 AT_{80}	—	December 21, 2008	Catalina	CSS	·	1.3 km	MPC · JPL
398769	2013 AN_{83}	—	October 1, 2008	Kitt Peak	Spacewatch	V	620 m	MPC · JPL
398770	2013 AC_{88}	—	December 17, 2003	Socorro	LINEAR	·	1.7 km	MPC · JPL
398771	2013 AO_{88}	—	February 24, 2009	Catalina	CSS	·	1.7 km	MPC · JPL
398772	2013 AR_{92}	—	November 22, 2006	Mount Lemmon	Mount Lemmon Survey	EOS	1.9 km	MPC · JPL
398773	2013 AU_{95}	—	March 24, 2009	Mount Lemmon	Mount Lemmon Survey	·	2.4 km	MPC · JPL
398774	2013 AD_{96}	—	April 11, 2010	Mount Lemmon	Mount Lemmon Survey	·	2.1 km	MPC · JPL
398775	2013 AR_{96}	—	September 10, 2007	Kitt Peak	Spacewatch	(5)	1.3 km	MPC · JPL
398776	2013 AZ_{101}	—	January 20, 2008	Mount Lemmon	Mount Lemmon Survey	·	1.8 km	MPC · JPL
398777	2013 AX_{104}	—	May 25, 2003	Kitt Peak	Spacewatch	·	910 m	MPC · JPL
398778	2013 AY_{108}	—	November 17, 2007	Kitt Peak	Spacewatch	·	1.4 km	MPC · JPL
398779	2013 AN_{111}	—	January 25, 2009	Kitt Peak	Spacewatch	·	1.3 km	MPC · JPL
398780	2013 AO_{111}	—	March 18, 2009	Catalina	CSS	·	1.9 km	MPC · JPL
398781	2013 AR_{117}	—	January 15, 2013	Tenerife	ESA OGS	HOF	3.0 km	MPC · JPL
398782	2013 AX_{117}	—	November 20, 2008	Kitt Peak	Spacewatch	·	1.4 km	MPC · JPL
398783	2013 AG_{118}	—	March 31, 2009	Mount Lemmon	Mount Lemmon Survey	·	1.7 km	MPC · JPL
398784	2013 AF_{122}	—	October 1, 2008	Mount Lemmon	Mount Lemmon Survey	·	1.1 km	MPC · JPL
398785	2013 AH_{122}	—	February 4, 2006	Mount Lemmon	Mount Lemmon Survey	·	1.6 km	MPC · JPL
398786	2013 AB_{124}	—	October 22, 2011	Mount Lemmon	Mount Lemmon Survey	AGN	1.4 km	MPC · JPL
398787	2013 AJ_{125}	—	December 22, 2003	Kitt Peak	Spacewatch	·	1.4 km	MPC · JPL
398788	2013 AU_{126}	—	March 17, 2005	Mount Lemmon	Mount Lemmon Survey	·	1.3 km	MPC · JPL
398789	2013 AX_{126}	—	September 26, 2005	Catalina	CSS	EOS	2.3 km	MPC · JPL
398790	2013 AG_{127}	—	December 29, 2003	Kitt Peak	Spacewatch	·	2.0 km	MPC · JPL
398791	2013 AR_{133}	—	September 15, 2009	Kitt Peak	Spacewatch	L4	8.4 km	MPC · JPL
398792	2013 AL_{134}	—	December 27, 2006	Mount Lemmon	Mount Lemmon Survey	·	2.2 km	MPC · JPL
398793	2013 AQ_{138}	—	April 4, 2003	Kitt Peak	Spacewatch	·	2.2 km	MPC · JPL
398794	2013 AO_{141}	—	September 26, 2005	Kitt Peak	Spacewatch	·	3.1 km	MPC · JPL
398795	2013 AV_{142}	—	April 26, 2010	Mount Lemmon	Mount Lemmon Survey	·	1.5 km	MPC · JPL
398796	2013 AR_{144}	—	October 30, 2007	Kitt Peak	Spacewatch	·	1.5 km	MPC · JPL
398797	2013 AT_{149}	—	February 12, 2008	Mount Lemmon	Mount Lemmon Survey	·	2.2 km	MPC · JPL
398798	2013 AQ_{167}	—	September 23, 2011	Kitt Peak	Spacewatch	·	1.5 km	MPC · JPL
398799	2013 AN_{173}	—	October 22, 2011	Kitt Peak	Spacewatch	·	2.4 km	MPC · JPL
398800	2013 BZ	—	October 19, 2010	Mount Lemmon	Mount Lemmon Survey	L4 · ERY	9.4 km	MPC · JPL

== 398801–398900 ==
back to top

Designation			Discovery			Properties		Ref
Permanent	Provisional	Named after	Date	Site	Discoverer(s)	Category	Diam.	Ref
398801	2013 BP_{11}	—	March 13, 2010	Kitt Peak	Spacewatch	·	2.9 km	MPC · JPL
398802	2013 BK_{20}	—	September 15, 2006	Kitt Peak	Spacewatch	·	1.8 km	MPC · JPL
398803	2013 BB_{22}	—	November 11, 2006	Mount Lemmon	Mount Lemmon Survey	·	1.8 km	MPC · JPL
398804	2013 BB_{29}	—	October 28, 1994	Kitt Peak	Spacewatch	·	1.8 km	MPC · JPL
398805	2013 BN_{31}	—	October 18, 2007	Kitt Peak	Spacewatch	WIT	840 m	MPC · JPL
398806	2013 BO_{37}	—	April 24, 2006	Kitt Peak	Spacewatch	·	1.5 km	MPC · JPL
398807	2013 BR_{37}	—	December 22, 2008	Mount Lemmon	Mount Lemmon Survey	·	1.8 km	MPC · JPL
398808	2013 BT_{37}	—	January 30, 2008	Mount Lemmon	Mount Lemmon Survey	·	1.4 km	MPC · JPL
398809	2013 BC_{38}	—	October 10, 2007	Mount Lemmon	Mount Lemmon Survey	·	1.6 km	MPC · JPL
398810	2013 BQ_{39}	—	August 27, 2005	Anderson Mesa	LONEOS	EOS	2.5 km	MPC · JPL
398811	2013 BS_{39}	—	May 8, 2005	Kitt Peak	Spacewatch	·	1.7 km	MPC · JPL
398812	2013 BD_{40}	—	March 9, 2008	Mount Lemmon	Mount Lemmon Survey	·	2.6 km	MPC · JPL
398813	2013 BJ_{40}	—	January 26, 2006	Kitt Peak	Spacewatch	·	1.3 km	MPC · JPL
398814	2013 BN_{43}	—	June 22, 2004	Kitt Peak	Spacewatch	·	4.4 km	MPC · JPL
398815	2013 BZ_{43}	—	November 8, 2008	Mount Lemmon	Mount Lemmon Survey	MAS	780 m	MPC · JPL
398816	2013 BZ_{53}	—	October 8, 2007	Mount Lemmon	Mount Lemmon Survey	·	1.2 km	MPC · JPL
398817	2013 BN_{55}	—	May 17, 2009	Kitt Peak	Spacewatch	·	2.9 km	MPC · JPL
398818	2013 BX_{56}	—	January 28, 2004	Kitt Peak	Spacewatch	·	1.4 km	MPC · JPL
398819	2013 BC_{61}	—	January 27, 2004	Kitt Peak	Spacewatch	·	2.1 km	MPC · JPL
398820	2013 BY_{63}	—	February 8, 2007	Mount Lemmon	Mount Lemmon Survey	·	3.2 km	MPC · JPL
398821	2013 BZ_{63}	—	December 3, 2008	Kitt Peak	Spacewatch	·	1.6 km	MPC · JPL
398822	2013 BV_{65}	—	July 18, 2007	Mount Lemmon	Mount Lemmon Survey	·	1.6 km	MPC · JPL
398823	2013 BX_{65}	—	March 1, 2008	Kitt Peak	Spacewatch	·	2.4 km	MPC · JPL
398824	2013 BY_{65}	—	September 23, 2000	Socorro	LINEAR	V	710 m	MPC · JPL
398825	2013 BE_{69}	—	May 29, 2009	Kitt Peak	Spacewatch	EOS	2.3 km	MPC · JPL
398826	2013 BG_{74}	—	November 20, 2007	Mount Lemmon	Mount Lemmon Survey	·	2.2 km	MPC · JPL
398827	2013 BQ_{78}	—	January 31, 2009	Mount Lemmon	Mount Lemmon Survey	·	1.3 km	MPC · JPL
398828	2013 BV_{80}	—	February 3, 2008	Catalina	CSS	EOS	2.7 km	MPC · JPL
398829	2013 CJ_{3}	—	February 29, 2008	Kitt Peak	Spacewatch	EOS	2.1 km	MPC · JPL
398830	2013 CQ_{3}	—	September 28, 2006	Mount Lemmon	Mount Lemmon Survey	·	2.0 km	MPC · JPL
398831	2013 CN_{4}	—	May 28, 2000	Socorro	LINEAR	·	950 m	MPC · JPL
398832	2013 CS_{4}	—	September 19, 2006	Kitt Peak	Spacewatch	AGN	1.2 km	MPC · JPL
398833	2013 CH_{10}	—	March 16, 2004	Kitt Peak	Spacewatch	·	2.3 km	MPC · JPL
398834	2013 CP_{10}	—	November 15, 1998	Kitt Peak	Spacewatch	·	1.9 km	MPC · JPL
398835	2013 CZ_{13}	—	November 6, 1996	Kitt Peak	Spacewatch	·	1.1 km	MPC · JPL
398836	2013 CV_{14}	—	February 2, 2008	Kitt Peak	Spacewatch	·	2.1 km	MPC · JPL
398837	2013 CE_{17}	—	October 19, 2011	Mount Lemmon	Mount Lemmon Survey	·	1.8 km	MPC · JPL
398838	2013 CP_{17}	—	April 2, 2006	Kitt Peak	Spacewatch	·	1.3 km	MPC · JPL
398839	2013 CV_{22}	—	January 10, 2008	Mount Lemmon	Mount Lemmon Survey	TRE	2.5 km	MPC · JPL
398840	2013 CP_{30}	—	April 25, 2006	Kitt Peak	Spacewatch	·	1.5 km	MPC · JPL
398841	2013 CL_{31}	—	November 27, 2011	Kitt Peak	Spacewatch	·	2.9 km	MPC · JPL
398842	2013 CT_{33}	—	September 23, 2005	Kitt Peak	Spacewatch	EOS	1.9 km	MPC · JPL
398843	2013 CD_{34}	—	January 2, 2003	Socorro	LINEAR	·	2.1 km	MPC · JPL
398844	2013 CY_{36}	—	April 15, 2008	Kitt Peak	Spacewatch	·	2.8 km	MPC · JPL
398845	2013 CY_{39}	—	December 19, 2003	Kitt Peak	Spacewatch	·	1.9 km	MPC · JPL
398846	2013 CA_{40}	—	October 30, 2005	Catalina	CSS	T_{j} (2.97)	5.2 km	MPC · JPL
398847	2013 CD_{42}	—	May 1, 2009	Mount Lemmon	Mount Lemmon Survey	·	1.9 km	MPC · JPL
398848	2013 CV_{42}	—	September 24, 2005	Kitt Peak	Spacewatch	·	3.0 km	MPC · JPL
398849	2013 CM_{44}	—	March 30, 2008	Kitt Peak	Spacewatch	·	2.4 km	MPC · JPL
398850	2013 CE_{45}	—	February 29, 2004	Kitt Peak	Spacewatch	·	2.7 km	MPC · JPL
398851	2013 CQ_{46}	—	December 24, 2006	Kitt Peak	Spacewatch	VER	3.6 km	MPC · JPL
398852	2013 CH_{47}	—	October 18, 2011	Kitt Peak	Spacewatch	·	2.3 km	MPC · JPL
398853	2013 CC_{49}	—	March 4, 2008	Mount Lemmon	Mount Lemmon Survey	·	2.7 km	MPC · JPL
398854	2013 CA_{50}	—	December 13, 2006	Mount Lemmon	Mount Lemmon Survey	·	2.8 km	MPC · JPL
398855	2013 CL_{50}	—	February 27, 2006	Kitt Peak	Spacewatch	V	720 m	MPC · JPL
398856	2013 CT_{50}	—	October 12, 2007	Mount Lemmon	Mount Lemmon Survey	·	1.4 km	MPC · JPL
398857	2013 CV_{50}	—	October 21, 2006	Mount Lemmon	Mount Lemmon Survey	·	1.8 km	MPC · JPL
398858	2013 CL_{51}	—	September 15, 2006	Kitt Peak	Spacewatch	·	1.9 km	MPC · JPL
398859	2013 CY_{51}	—	December 5, 1996	Kitt Peak	Spacewatch	·	1.3 km	MPC · JPL
398860	2013 CF_{52}	—	February 17, 2004	Socorro	LINEAR	NEM	2.6 km	MPC · JPL
398861	2013 CQ_{52}	—	December 2, 2008	Mount Lemmon	Mount Lemmon Survey	·	1.7 km	MPC · JPL
398862	2013 CY_{53}	—	June 22, 2009	Kitt Peak	Spacewatch	·	4.9 km	MPC · JPL
398863	2013 CB_{55}	—	April 8, 2008	Kitt Peak	Spacewatch	VER	4.6 km	MPC · JPL
398864	2013 CN_{56}	—	September 20, 2003	Kitt Peak	Spacewatch	·	1.3 km	MPC · JPL
398865	2013 CA_{58}	—	October 30, 2005	Kitt Peak	Spacewatch	·	2.9 km	MPC · JPL
398866	2013 CR_{58}	—	October 26, 2005	Kitt Peak	Spacewatch	·	3.0 km	MPC · JPL
398867	2013 CV_{58}	—	August 13, 2010	Kitt Peak	Spacewatch	EOS	2.5 km	MPC · JPL
398868	2013 CW_{58}	—	September 17, 2006	Kitt Peak	Spacewatch	AGN	1.4 km	MPC · JPL
398869	2013 CB_{60}	—	January 30, 2008	Mount Lemmon	Mount Lemmon Survey	·	1.6 km	MPC · JPL
398870	2013 CZ_{60}	—	October 23, 2011	Mount Lemmon	Mount Lemmon Survey	·	2.1 km	MPC · JPL
398871	2013 CK_{62}	—	January 30, 2004	Kitt Peak	Spacewatch	·	2.6 km	MPC · JPL
398872	2013 CN_{62}	—	November 1, 2011	Mount Lemmon	Mount Lemmon Survey	·	2.7 km	MPC · JPL
398873	2013 CQ_{63}	—	September 16, 2010	Mount Lemmon	Mount Lemmon Survey	·	3.0 km	MPC · JPL
398874	2013 CX_{65}	—	February 17, 2004	Kitt Peak	Spacewatch	·	1.8 km	MPC · JPL
398875	2013 CP_{66}	—	May 12, 1999	Socorro	LINEAR	·	1.6 km	MPC · JPL
398876	2013 CY_{67}	—	August 21, 2006	Kitt Peak	Spacewatch	PAD	1.7 km	MPC · JPL
398877	2013 CV_{68}	—	March 10, 2005	Mount Lemmon	Mount Lemmon Survey	·	1.5 km	MPC · JPL
398878	2013 CH_{72}	—	November 4, 2004	Catalina	CSS	·	1.5 km	MPC · JPL
398879	2013 CR_{75}	—	October 20, 2011	Kitt Peak	Spacewatch	·	1.8 km	MPC · JPL
398880	2013 CW_{76}	—	January 16, 2004	Kitt Peak	Spacewatch	·	1.8 km	MPC · JPL
398881	2013 CT_{81}	—	September 29, 2011	Kitt Peak	Spacewatch	·	1.6 km	MPC · JPL
398882	2013 CU_{81}	—	August 31, 2005	Kitt Peak	Spacewatch	EOS	1.8 km	MPC · JPL
398883	2013 CQ_{84}	—	February 10, 2007	Mount Lemmon	Mount Lemmon Survey	EOS	2.1 km	MPC · JPL
398884	2013 CJ_{85}	—	November 22, 1995	Kitt Peak	Spacewatch	·	800 m	MPC · JPL
398885	2013 CV_{86}	—	March 8, 2008	Kitt Peak	Spacewatch	·	2.3 km	MPC · JPL
398886	2013 CA_{91}	—	March 3, 2008	Mount Lemmon	Mount Lemmon Survey	·	3.0 km	MPC · JPL
398887	2013 CP_{91}	—	October 20, 2011	Mount Lemmon	Mount Lemmon Survey	·	1.8 km	MPC · JPL
398888	2013 CD_{94}	—	December 28, 2003	Kitt Peak	Spacewatch	·	1.4 km	MPC · JPL
398889	2013 CW_{95}	—	November 6, 2007	Kitt Peak	Spacewatch	·	1.5 km	MPC · JPL
398890	2013 CU_{99}	—	January 11, 2008	Kitt Peak	Spacewatch	HOF	2.6 km	MPC · JPL
398891	2013 CR_{102}	—	February 13, 2004	Kitt Peak	Spacewatch	AGN	1.3 km	MPC · JPL
398892	2013 CV_{103}	—	October 22, 2005	Kitt Peak	Spacewatch	·	3.0 km	MPC · JPL
398893	2013 CT_{110}	—	January 10, 2007	Mount Lemmon	Mount Lemmon Survey	·	3.0 km	MPC · JPL
398894	2013 CO_{116}	—	December 24, 2006	Mount Lemmon	Mount Lemmon Survey	·	3.3 km	MPC · JPL
398895	2013 CQ_{116}	—	February 8, 2007	Mount Lemmon	Mount Lemmon Survey	·	3.8 km	MPC · JPL
398896	2013 CG_{117}	—	December 13, 2006	Mount Lemmon	Mount Lemmon Survey	·	1.9 km	MPC · JPL
398897	2013 CL_{121}	—	November 24, 2006	Kitt Peak	Spacewatch	·	2.9 km	MPC · JPL
398898	2013 CO_{121}	—	January 8, 1999	Kitt Peak	Spacewatch	·	2.1 km	MPC · JPL
398899	2013 CA_{124}	—	October 15, 2007	Anderson Mesa	LONEOS	·	1.3 km	MPC · JPL
398900	2013 CN_{124}	—	October 4, 1999	Kitt Peak	Spacewatch	·	1.4 km	MPC · JPL

== 398901–399000 ==
back to top

Designation			Discovery			Properties		Ref
Permanent	Provisional	Named after	Date	Site	Discoverer(s)	Category	Diam.	Ref
398901	2013 CL_{127}	—	September 14, 2005	Catalina	CSS	·	2.8 km	MPC · JPL
398902	2013 CM_{130}	—	January 27, 2007	Mount Lemmon	Mount Lemmon Survey	HYG	2.7 km	MPC · JPL
398903	2013 CJ_{131}	—	February 28, 2008	Mount Lemmon	Mount Lemmon Survey	·	1.8 km	MPC · JPL
398904	2013 CN_{132}	—	August 3, 2004	Siding Spring	SSS	·	3.6 km	MPC · JPL
398905	2013 CZ_{134}	—	February 17, 2007	Mount Lemmon	Mount Lemmon Survey	VER	2.6 km	MPC · JPL
398906	2013 CL_{137}	—	December 21, 2005	Kitt Peak	Spacewatch	·	3.9 km	MPC · JPL
398907	2013 CE_{138}	—	September 4, 2007	Mount Lemmon	Mount Lemmon Survey	·	1.6 km	MPC · JPL
398908	2013 CK_{143}	—	August 18, 2006	Kitt Peak	Spacewatch	AGN	1.2 km	MPC · JPL
398909	2013 CB_{144}	—	February 2, 2008	Mount Lemmon	Mount Lemmon Survey	·	2.0 km	MPC · JPL
398910	2013 CO_{145}	—	March 6, 2008	Mount Lemmon	Mount Lemmon Survey	·	2.3 km	MPC · JPL
398911	2013 CW_{148}	—	January 24, 2007	Mount Lemmon	Mount Lemmon Survey	·	2.2 km	MPC · JPL
398912	2013 CN_{150}	—	June 11, 2010	WISE	WISE	·	1.6 km	MPC · JPL
398913	2013 CY_{155}	—	February 1, 1995	Kitt Peak	Spacewatch	·	2.9 km	MPC · JPL
398914	2013 CK_{156}	—	February 17, 2007	Mount Lemmon	Mount Lemmon Survey	VER	2.8 km	MPC · JPL
398915	2013 CX_{156}	—	December 19, 2007	Kitt Peak	Spacewatch	·	1.8 km	MPC · JPL
398916	2013 CY_{156}	—	February 2, 2008	Mount Lemmon	Mount Lemmon Survey	·	1.7 km	MPC · JPL
398917	2013 CZ_{156}	—	February 12, 2008	Mount Lemmon	Mount Lemmon Survey	·	3.5 km	MPC · JPL
398918	2013 CD_{157}	—	June 1, 2009	Mount Lemmon	Mount Lemmon Survey	·	2.0 km	MPC · JPL
398919	2013 CW_{165}	—	December 27, 2006	Mount Lemmon	Mount Lemmon Survey	·	3.3 km	MPC · JPL
398920	2013 CP_{168}	—	October 27, 2005	Mount Lemmon	Mount Lemmon Survey	·	3.6 km	MPC · JPL
398921	2013 CL_{171}	—	August 27, 2006	Kitt Peak	Spacewatch	·	1.6 km	MPC · JPL
398922	2013 CO_{173}	—	April 18, 2009	Mount Lemmon	Mount Lemmon Survey	PAD	1.6 km	MPC · JPL
398923	2013 CY_{174}	—	February 6, 2007	Mount Lemmon	Mount Lemmon Survey	·	3.3 km	MPC · JPL
398924	2013 CB_{175}	—	February 12, 2004	Kitt Peak	Spacewatch	·	1.6 km	MPC · JPL
398925	2013 CP_{176}	—	April 15, 2009	Siding Spring	SSS	·	1.5 km	MPC · JPL
398926	2013 CY_{177}	—	February 19, 2009	Mount Lemmon	Mount Lemmon Survey	·	1.5 km	MPC · JPL
398927	2013 CQ_{178}	—	January 25, 2007	Catalina	CSS	T_{j} (2.99) · EUP	3.3 km	MPC · JPL
398928	2013 CE_{179}	—	February 2, 2008	Kitt Peak	Spacewatch	EOS	2.1 km	MPC · JPL
398929	2013 CT_{181}	—	March 31, 2008	Kitt Peak	Spacewatch	·	3.6 km	MPC · JPL
398930	2013 CS_{185}	—	October 9, 2004	Kitt Peak	Spacewatch	·	760 m	MPC · JPL
398931	2013 CP_{188}	—	March 10, 2000	Socorro	LINEAR	·	2.3 km	MPC · JPL
398932	2013 CH_{189}	—	September 24, 2005	Anderson Mesa	LONEOS	·	4.8 km	MPC · JPL
398933	2013 CE_{190}	—	March 2, 2008	Kitt Peak	Spacewatch	·	2.7 km	MPC · JPL
398934	2013 CT_{190}	—	December 30, 2007	Kitt Peak	Spacewatch	NEM	1.9 km	MPC · JPL
398935	2013 CJ_{192}	—	December 11, 2006	Kitt Peak	Spacewatch	·	2.6 km	MPC · JPL
398936	2013 CL_{193}	—	November 19, 2006	Kitt Peak	Spacewatch	EOS	2.2 km	MPC · JPL
398937	2013 CP_{193}	—	August 12, 2010	Kitt Peak	Spacewatch	·	2.8 km	MPC · JPL
398938	2013 CQ_{194}	—	November 9, 2007	Kitt Peak	Spacewatch	·	1.4 km	MPC · JPL
398939	2013 CA_{197}	—	November 24, 2008	Mount Lemmon	Mount Lemmon Survey	MAS	800 m	MPC · JPL
398940	2013 CM_{197}	—	March 26, 2006	Kitt Peak	Spacewatch	NYS	1.4 km	MPC · JPL
398941	2013 CU_{197}	—	February 24, 2008	Kitt Peak	Spacewatch	EOS	1.4 km	MPC · JPL
398942	2013 CQ_{200}	—	November 18, 1998	Kitt Peak	Spacewatch	·	1.7 km	MPC · JPL
398943	2013 CD_{201}	—	September 18, 2006	Kitt Peak	Spacewatch	·	1.7 km	MPC · JPL
398944	2013 CE_{206}	—	November 8, 2007	Mount Lemmon	Mount Lemmon Survey	·	1.8 km	MPC · JPL
398945	2013 CY_{211}	—	March 19, 2010	Kitt Peak	Spacewatch	·	1.3 km	MPC · JPL
398946	2013 CS_{213}	—	January 10, 2008	Kitt Peak	Spacewatch	KOR	1.4 km	MPC · JPL
398947	2013 DS_{2}	—	September 15, 2006	Kitt Peak	Spacewatch	·	1.6 km	MPC · JPL
398948	2013 DK_{5}	—	January 10, 2007	Kitt Peak	Spacewatch	·	4.0 km	MPC · JPL
398949	2013 DZ_{5}	—	January 28, 2007	Mount Lemmon	Mount Lemmon Survey	·	3.2 km	MPC · JPL
398950	2013 DJ_{6}	—	January 28, 2007	Mount Lemmon	Mount Lemmon Survey	VER	3.3 km	MPC · JPL
398951	2013 DK_{7}	—	January 10, 2007	Mount Lemmon	Mount Lemmon Survey	EOS	1.9 km	MPC · JPL
398952	2013 DT_{10}	—	January 10, 2008	Kitt Peak	Spacewatch	·	1.8 km	MPC · JPL
398953	2013 DJ_{13}	—	October 31, 2008	Mount Lemmon	Mount Lemmon Survey	·	1.4 km	MPC · JPL
398954	2013 DL_{13}	—	March 19, 2005	Siding Spring	SSS	·	2.4 km	MPC · JPL
398955	2013 DW_{15}	—	February 12, 2008	Mount Lemmon	Mount Lemmon Survey	TEL	1.6 km	MPC · JPL
398956	2013 ET_{1}	—	January 13, 1999	Kitt Peak	Spacewatch	NEM	2.5 km	MPC · JPL
398957	2013 EW_{2}	—	March 15, 2004	Kitt Peak	Spacewatch	·	1.8 km	MPC · JPL
398958	2013 EL_{3}	—	September 30, 1997	Kitt Peak	Spacewatch	·	2.0 km	MPC · JPL
398959	2013 EX_{6}	—	March 2, 2008	Kitt Peak	Spacewatch	·	2.6 km	MPC · JPL
398960	2013 EQ_{7}	—	March 30, 2008	Kitt Peak	Spacewatch	·	3.4 km	MPC · JPL
398961	2013 EM_{10}	—	December 5, 2010	Mount Lemmon	Mount Lemmon Survey	·	3.6 km	MPC · JPL
398962	2013 EP_{12}	—	September 19, 2006	Kitt Peak	Spacewatch	·	1.7 km	MPC · JPL
398963	2013 EF_{13}	—	August 29, 2005	Kitt Peak	Spacewatch	·	2.2 km	MPC · JPL
398964	2013 EX_{13}	—	July 5, 2005	Mount Lemmon	Mount Lemmon Survey	KOR	1.4 km	MPC · JPL
398965	2013 ED_{14}	—	February 28, 2008	Mount Lemmon	Mount Lemmon Survey	·	1.8 km	MPC · JPL
398966	2013 ES_{14}	—	April 1, 2008	Mount Lemmon	Mount Lemmon Survey	·	2.6 km	MPC · JPL
398967	2013 EJ_{21}	—	October 7, 2005	Kitt Peak	Spacewatch	EOS	1.7 km	MPC · JPL
398968	2013 EU_{29}	—	August 29, 2006	Catalina	CSS	HNS	1.4 km	MPC · JPL
398969	2013 EE_{34}	—	February 27, 2009	Mount Lemmon	Mount Lemmon Survey	·	2.4 km	MPC · JPL
398970	2013 EY_{35}	—	January 28, 2006	Mount Lemmon	Mount Lemmon Survey	V	700 m	MPC · JPL
398971	2013 EE_{42}	—	October 9, 2004	Kitt Peak	Spacewatch	·	4.9 km	MPC · JPL
398972	2013 EF_{49}	—	March 9, 2005	Mount Lemmon	Mount Lemmon Survey	3:2 · SHU	4.8 km	MPC · JPL
398973	2013 EJ_{50}	—	February 7, 2006	Kitt Peak	Spacewatch	·	2.2 km	MPC · JPL
398974	2013 EM_{50}	—	September 13, 2005	Kitt Peak	Spacewatch	NAE	1.9 km	MPC · JPL
398975	2013 EE_{54}	—	October 7, 2004	Kitt Peak	Spacewatch	·	2.8 km	MPC · JPL
398976	2013 EY_{57}	—	March 10, 2003	Kitt Peak	Spacewatch	·	2.6 km	MPC · JPL
398977	2013 EC_{60}	—	April 3, 2008	Kitt Peak	Spacewatch	·	3.0 km	MPC · JPL
398978	2013 EE_{66}	—	November 18, 2011	Mount Lemmon	Mount Lemmon Survey	·	3.8 km	MPC · JPL
398979	2013 EF_{66}	—	September 12, 2010	Mount Lemmon	Mount Lemmon Survey	·	3.4 km	MPC · JPL
398980	2013 EM_{72}	—	November 19, 2003	Anderson Mesa	LONEOS	·	1.0 km	MPC · JPL
398981	2013 EH_{79}	—	February 22, 2007	Kitt Peak	Spacewatch	VER	4.4 km	MPC · JPL
398982	2013 EC_{80}	—	February 9, 2005	Kitt Peak	Spacewatch	3:2 · SHU	5.3 km	MPC · JPL
398983	2013 EU_{81}	—	August 13, 2010	Kitt Peak	Spacewatch	·	3.4 km	MPC · JPL
398984	2013 EA_{82}	—	June 25, 2010	WISE	WISE	·	3.3 km	MPC · JPL
398985	2013 EK_{88}	—	August 24, 2007	Kitt Peak	Spacewatch	NYS	1.2 km	MPC · JPL
398986	2013 EB_{90}	—	November 17, 2011	Kitt Peak	Spacewatch	·	4.4 km	MPC · JPL
398987	2013 ES_{92}	—	November 5, 2007	Mount Lemmon	Mount Lemmon Survey	EUN	2.6 km	MPC · JPL
398988	2013 EF_{99}	—	March 28, 2008	Kitt Peak	Spacewatch	·	2.8 km	MPC · JPL
398989	2013 EA_{101}	—	February 7, 2002	Socorro	LINEAR	EOS	2.6 km	MPC · JPL
398990	2013 EL_{107}	—	October 4, 2000	Kitt Peak	Spacewatch	·	2.2 km	MPC · JPL
398991	2013 ET_{109}	—	November 21, 2006	Mount Lemmon	Mount Lemmon Survey	·	4.0 km	MPC · JPL
398992	2013 EJ_{111}	—	April 27, 2008	Kitt Peak	Spacewatch	HYG	3.4 km	MPC · JPL
398993	2013 EB_{112}	—	September 24, 2005	Kitt Peak	Spacewatch	·	2.2 km	MPC · JPL
398994	2013 EM_{112}	—	January 10, 2007	Kitt Peak	Spacewatch	·	5.3 km	MPC · JPL
398995	2013 EN_{120}	—	February 2, 2008	Mount Lemmon	Mount Lemmon Survey	·	2.3 km	MPC · JPL
398996	2013 EM_{121}	—	October 29, 2010	Mount Lemmon	Mount Lemmon Survey	EOS	1.9 km	MPC · JPL
398997	2013 EQ_{128}	—	May 25, 2010	WISE	WISE	T_{j} (2.98) · EUP	3.9 km	MPC · JPL
398998	2013 EB_{147}	—	October 12, 1999	Kitt Peak	Spacewatch	(1298)	2.1 km	MPC · JPL
398999	2013 FS_{1}	—	December 11, 2006	Kitt Peak	Spacewatch	·	2.5 km	MPC · JPL
399000	2013 FV_{14}	—	May 7, 2008	Mount Lemmon	Mount Lemmon Survey	·	2.9 km	MPC · JPL

back to top

== See also ==
- Meanings of minor-planet names: 398001–399000
