= List of minor planets: 397001–398000 =

The following is a partial list of minor planets, running from minor-planet number 397001 through 398000, inclusive. The primary data for this and other partial lists is based on JPL's "Small-Body Orbital Elements" and data available from the Minor Planet Center. Critical list information is also provided by the MPC, unless otherwise specified from Lowell Observatory. A detailed description of the table's columns and additional sources are given on the main page including a complete list of every page in this series, and a statistical break-up on the dynamical classification of minor planets.

Also see the summary list of all named bodies in numerical and alphabetical order, and the corresponding naming citations for the number range of this particular list. New namings may only be added to this list after official publication, as the preannouncement of names is condemned by the Working Group for Small Bodies Nomenclature of the International Astronomical Union.

Near-Earth obj.	MBA (inner)	MBA (outer)	Centaur
Mars-crosser	MBA (middle)	Jupiter trojan	Trans-Neptunian obj.
Unclassified

== 397001–397100 ==
Designation			Discovery			Properties		Ref
Permanent	Provisional	Named after	Date	Site	Discoverer(s)	Category	Diam.	Ref
397001	2005 SW_{284}	—	September 25, 2005	Apache Point	A. C. Becker	EOS	1.8 km	MPC · JPL
397002	2005 SA_{289}	—	September 27, 2005	Apache Point	A. C. Becker	·	2.3 km	MPC · JPL
397003	2005 SU_{291}	—	September 26, 2005	Kitt Peak	Spacewatch	·	960 m	MPC · JPL
397004	2005 SA_{292}	—	September 27, 2005	Kitt Peak	Spacewatch	·	3.2 km	MPC · JPL
397005	2005 TB_{3}	—	October 1, 2005	Catalina	CSS	·	3.2 km	MPC · JPL
397006	2005 TM_{6}	—	October 1, 2005	Catalina	CSS	EOS	2.5 km	MPC · JPL
397007	2005 TT_{6}	—	September 11, 2005	Anderson Mesa	LONEOS	·	2.5 km	MPC · JPL
397008	2005 TB_{12}	—	October 1, 2005	Kitt Peak	Spacewatch	·	670 m	MPC · JPL
397009	2005 TQ_{27}	—	October 1, 2005	Catalina	CSS	·	4.0 km	MPC · JPL
397010	2005 TR_{36}	—	October 1, 2005	Socorro	LINEAR	·	2.1 km	MPC · JPL
397011	2005 TV_{37}	—	October 1, 2005	Mount Lemmon	Mount Lemmon Survey	·	1.8 km	MPC · JPL
397012	2005 TD_{51}	—	October 13, 2005	Kitt Peak	Spacewatch	EUP	4.6 km	MPC · JPL
397013	2005 TG_{53}	—	October 8, 2005	Moletai	K. Černis, Zdanavicius, J.	EOS	1.8 km	MPC · JPL
397014	2005 TS_{58}	—	October 1, 2005	Mount Lemmon	Mount Lemmon Survey	URS	2.9 km	MPC · JPL
397015	2005 TR_{72}	—	October 5, 2005	Catalina	CSS	·	3.4 km	MPC · JPL
397016	2005 TV_{72}	—	October 5, 2005	Catalina	CSS	·	4.7 km	MPC · JPL
397017	2005 TN_{124}	—	September 24, 2005	Kitt Peak	Spacewatch	EOS	1.8 km	MPC · JPL
397018	2005 TR_{124}	—	October 7, 2005	Kitt Peak	Spacewatch	·	3.1 km	MPC · JPL
397019	2005 TW_{124}	—	October 7, 2005	Kitt Peak	Spacewatch	·	3.6 km	MPC · JPL
397020	2005 TW_{134}	—	September 30, 2005	Kitt Peak	Spacewatch	·	2.3 km	MPC · JPL
397021	2005 TD_{137}	—	October 6, 2005	Kitt Peak	Spacewatch	·	2.8 km	MPC · JPL
397022	2005 TB_{146}	—	October 8, 2005	Kitt Peak	Spacewatch	·	1.7 km	MPC · JPL
397023	2005 TN_{163}	—	October 9, 2005	Kitt Peak	Spacewatch	·	3.4 km	MPC · JPL
397024	2005 TQ_{191}	—	October 1, 2005	Catalina	CSS	·	800 m	MPC · JPL
397025	2005 TH_{194}	—	October 1, 2005	Mount Lemmon	Mount Lemmon Survey	·	3.1 km	MPC · JPL
397026	2005 UB_{4}	—	October 26, 2005	Mount Graham	Ryan, W. H.	·	1.9 km	MPC · JPL
397027	2005 UM_{8}	—	October 27, 2005	Ottmarsheim	C. Rinner	·	2.0 km	MPC · JPL
397028	2005 UO_{10}	—	October 7, 2005	Catalina	CSS	·	850 m	MPC · JPL
397029	2005 UN_{12}	—	October 30, 2005	Mayhill	Guido, E.	·	3.4 km	MPC · JPL
397030	2005 UU_{14}	—	October 22, 2005	Kitt Peak	Spacewatch	·	880 m	MPC · JPL
397031	2005 UL_{18}	—	October 22, 2005	Kitt Peak	Spacewatch	·	850 m	MPC · JPL
397032	2005 UA_{46}	—	September 30, 2005	Catalina	CSS	·	1.3 km	MPC · JPL
397033	2005 UN_{47}	—	October 22, 2005	Kitt Peak	Spacewatch	·	790 m	MPC · JPL
397034	2005 UP_{49}	—	October 23, 2005	Palomar	NEAT	·	4.4 km	MPC · JPL
397035	2005 UQ_{50}	—	October 23, 2005	Catalina	CSS	·	980 m	MPC · JPL
397036	2005 UM_{52}	—	October 23, 2005	Catalina	CSS	·	5.1 km	MPC · JPL
397037	2005 UN_{53}	—	October 23, 2005	Catalina	CSS	·	680 m	MPC · JPL
397038	2005 UZ_{53}	—	September 25, 2005	Kitt Peak	Spacewatch	·	810 m	MPC · JPL
397039	2005 US_{55}	—	October 23, 2005	Catalina	CSS	·	830 m	MPC · JPL
397040	2005 UV_{63}	—	October 25, 2005	Mount Lemmon	Mount Lemmon Survey	EOS	2.0 km	MPC · JPL
397041	2005 UL_{68}	—	October 22, 2005	Palomar	NEAT	·	2.9 km	MPC · JPL
397042	2005 UG_{69}	—	October 23, 2005	Palomar	NEAT	EOS	2.5 km	MPC · JPL
397043	2005 UY_{70}	—	October 23, 2005	Catalina	CSS	V	720 m	MPC · JPL
397044	2005 UB_{80}	—	October 25, 2005	Kitt Peak	Spacewatch	·	770 m	MPC · JPL
397045	2005 UL_{82}	—	October 1, 2005	Mount Lemmon	Mount Lemmon Survey	·	2.6 km	MPC · JPL
397046	2005 US_{83}	—	October 22, 2005	Kitt Peak	Spacewatch	·	3.6 km	MPC · JPL
397047	2005 UU_{91}	—	October 22, 2005	Kitt Peak	Spacewatch	·	3.3 km	MPC · JPL
397048	2005 UQ_{92}	—	October 22, 2005	Kitt Peak	Spacewatch	·	2.4 km	MPC · JPL
397049	2005 UU_{93}	—	October 22, 2005	Kitt Peak	Spacewatch	TIR	3.2 km	MPC · JPL
397050	2005 UL_{98}	—	October 22, 2005	Kitt Peak	Spacewatch	·	3.3 km	MPC · JPL
397051	2005 UV_{99}	—	October 22, 2005	Kitt Peak	Spacewatch	·	940 m	MPC · JPL
397052	2005 UP_{101}	—	October 22, 2005	Kitt Peak	Spacewatch	·	2.8 km	MPC · JPL
397053	2005 UW_{103}	—	October 22, 2005	Kitt Peak	Spacewatch	THM	2.1 km	MPC · JPL
397054	2005 UB_{107}	—	October 22, 2005	Kitt Peak	Spacewatch	·	3.1 km	MPC · JPL
397055	2005 UG_{109}	—	October 22, 2005	Palomar	NEAT	·	770 m	MPC · JPL
397056	2005 UQ_{109}	—	October 22, 2005	Kitt Peak	Spacewatch	·	2.9 km	MPC · JPL
397057	2005 UC_{121}	—	October 24, 2005	Kitt Peak	Spacewatch	·	3.4 km	MPC · JPL
397058	2005 UD_{126}	—	October 24, 2005	Kitt Peak	Spacewatch	·	4.6 km	MPC · JPL
397059	2005 UB_{132}	—	October 24, 2005	Kitt Peak	Spacewatch	·	700 m	MPC · JPL
397060	2005 UJ_{139}	—	October 25, 2005	Anderson Mesa	LONEOS	·	5.0 km	MPC · JPL
397061	2005 UY_{148}	—	October 26, 2005	Kitt Peak	Spacewatch	·	1.3 km	MPC · JPL
397062	2005 UX_{149}	—	October 26, 2005	Kitt Peak	Spacewatch	·	2.8 km	MPC · JPL
397063	2005 UA_{151}	—	October 26, 2005	Kitt Peak	Spacewatch	·	4.1 km	MPC · JPL
397064	2005 UU_{152}	—	October 26, 2005	Kitt Peak	Spacewatch	·	3.2 km	MPC · JPL
397065	2005 UQ_{156}	—	October 25, 2005	Kitt Peak	Spacewatch	·	2.8 km	MPC · JPL
397066	2005 UE_{158}	—	October 25, 2005	Kitt Peak	Spacewatch	·	3.2 km	MPC · JPL
397067	2005 UK_{160}	—	October 5, 2005	Catalina	CSS	·	840 m	MPC · JPL
397068	2005 UU_{161}	—	October 25, 2005	Kitt Peak	Spacewatch	·	900 m	MPC · JPL
397069	2005 UF_{163}	—	October 23, 2005	Kitt Peak	Spacewatch	·	940 m	MPC · JPL
397070	2005 UA_{167}	—	October 5, 2005	Kitt Peak	Spacewatch	·	780 m	MPC · JPL
397071	2005 UR_{167}	—	October 24, 2005	Kitt Peak	Spacewatch	·	850 m	MPC · JPL
397072	2005 UC_{178}	—	October 24, 2005	Kitt Peak	Spacewatch	·	4.4 km	MPC · JPL
397073	2005 UT_{179}	—	October 24, 2005	Kitt Peak	Spacewatch	·	2.3 km	MPC · JPL
397074	2005 UF_{183}	—	October 25, 2005	Kitt Peak	Spacewatch	EOS	1.9 km	MPC · JPL
397075	2005 UR_{184}	—	October 25, 2005	Mount Lemmon	Mount Lemmon Survey	·	670 m	MPC · JPL
397076	2005 UH_{231}	—	October 25, 2005	Mount Lemmon	Mount Lemmon Survey	·	2.6 km	MPC · JPL
397077	2005 UM_{240}	—	October 25, 2005	Kitt Peak	Spacewatch	·	870 m	MPC · JPL
397078	2005 UG_{249}	—	October 28, 2005	Mount Lemmon	Mount Lemmon Survey	·	2.3 km	MPC · JPL
397079	2005 UX_{249}	—	October 22, 2005	Kitt Peak	Spacewatch	·	2.8 km	MPC · JPL
397080	2005 UG_{252}	—	October 26, 2005	Anderson Mesa	LONEOS	·	3.0 km	MPC · JPL
397081	2005 UG_{260}	—	October 25, 2005	Kitt Peak	Spacewatch	EOS	2.1 km	MPC · JPL
397082	2005 US_{275}	—	October 29, 2005	Catalina	CSS	·	4.6 km	MPC · JPL
397083	2005 UU_{282}	—	October 26, 2005	Kitt Peak	Spacewatch	·	2.8 km	MPC · JPL
397084	2005 UL_{287}	—	October 26, 2005	Kitt Peak	Spacewatch	EOS	1.4 km	MPC · JPL
397085	2005 UU_{292}	—	October 26, 2005	Kitt Peak	Spacewatch	VER	2.9 km	MPC · JPL
397086	2005 UX_{292}	—	October 26, 2005	Kitt Peak	Spacewatch	·	3.4 km	MPC · JPL
397087	2005 UG_{308}	—	October 27, 2005	Mount Lemmon	Mount Lemmon Survey	·	3.0 km	MPC · JPL
397088	2005 US_{308}	—	October 27, 2005	Catalina	CSS	·	3.2 km	MPC · JPL
397089	2005 UG_{340}	—	October 22, 2005	Kitt Peak	Spacewatch	·	2.5 km	MPC · JPL
397090	2005 UA_{350}	—	October 27, 2005	Palomar	NEAT	·	2.4 km	MPC · JPL
397091	2005 UB_{350}	—	October 27, 2005	Palomar	NEAT	·	950 m	MPC · JPL
397092	2005 UH_{357}	—	October 31, 2005	Mount Lemmon	Mount Lemmon Survey	EOS	2.4 km	MPC · JPL
397093	2005 UR_{369}	—	October 27, 2005	Kitt Peak	Spacewatch	·	2.7 km	MPC · JPL
397094	2005 UP_{407}	—	October 30, 2005	Mount Lemmon	Mount Lemmon Survey	·	1.9 km	MPC · JPL
397095	2005 UP_{436}	—	October 31, 2005	Kitt Peak	Spacewatch	·	2.3 km	MPC · JPL
397096	2005 UL_{439}	—	October 29, 2005	Kitt Peak	Spacewatch	·	3.9 km	MPC · JPL
397097	2005 UJ_{459}	—	October 31, 2005	Kitt Peak	Spacewatch	·	2.4 km	MPC · JPL
397098	2005 UO_{459}	—	October 27, 2005	Mount Lemmon	Mount Lemmon Survey	·	620 m	MPC · JPL
397099	2005 US_{462}	—	October 30, 2005	Kitt Peak	Spacewatch	·	650 m	MPC · JPL
397100	2005 UD_{467}	—	October 30, 2005	Kitt Peak	Spacewatch	ELF	3.4 km	MPC · JPL

== 397101–397200 ==
back to top

Designation			Discovery			Properties		Ref
Permanent	Provisional	Named after	Date	Site	Discoverer(s)	Category	Diam.	Ref
397101	2005 UO_{492}	—	October 25, 2005	Socorro	LINEAR	·	3.0 km	MPC · JPL
397102	2005 UX_{511}	—	October 28, 2005	Kitt Peak	Spacewatch	·	3.1 km	MPC · JPL
397103	2005 UF_{515}	—	October 22, 2005	Apache Point	A. C. Becker	·	3.0 km	MPC · JPL
397104	2005 UV_{515}	—	October 22, 2005	Apache Point	A. C. Becker	·	2.8 km	MPC · JPL
397105	2005 UW_{516}	—	October 25, 2005	Apache Point	A. C. Becker	·	2.0 km	MPC · JPL
397106	2005 UJ_{520}	—	October 26, 2005	Apache Point	A. C. Becker	·	2.1 km	MPC · JPL
397107	2005 UE_{522}	—	October 26, 2005	Apache Point	A. C. Becker	·	3.6 km	MPC · JPL
397108	2005 UD_{524}	—	October 27, 2005	Apache Point	A. C. Becker	·	580 m	MPC · JPL
397109	2005 VM_{9}	—	November 1, 2005	Kitt Peak	Spacewatch	·	3.7 km	MPC · JPL
397110	2005 VL_{31}	—	November 4, 2005	Kitt Peak	Spacewatch	·	2.2 km	MPC · JPL
397111	2005 VN_{35}	—	November 3, 2005	Mount Lemmon	Mount Lemmon Survey	·	2.4 km	MPC · JPL
397112	2005 VF_{48}	—	May 22, 2003	Kitt Peak	Spacewatch	·	4.1 km	MPC · JPL
397113	2005 VG_{54}	—	November 4, 2005	Kitt Peak	Spacewatch	·	2.6 km	MPC · JPL
397114	2005 VS_{88}	—	November 6, 2005	Kitt Peak	Spacewatch	·	850 m	MPC · JPL
397115	2005 VM_{91}	—	November 6, 2005	Socorro	LINEAR	·	740 m	MPC · JPL
397116	2005 VX_{91}	—	October 28, 2005	Mount Lemmon	Mount Lemmon Survey	·	3.0 km	MPC · JPL
397117	2005 VE_{102}	—	November 1, 2005	Anderson Mesa	LONEOS	·	1.3 km	MPC · JPL
397118	2005 VJ_{117}	—	October 26, 2005	Kitt Peak	Spacewatch	·	2.1 km	MPC · JPL
397119	2005 VK_{124}	—	November 6, 2005	Mount Lemmon	Mount Lemmon Survey	·	890 m	MPC · JPL
397120	2005 VX_{124}	—	November 6, 2005	Mount Lemmon	Mount Lemmon Survey	·	830 m	MPC · JPL
397121	2005 VS_{126}	—	November 1, 2005	Apache Point	A. C. Becker	EOS	1.8 km	MPC · JPL
397122	2005 WA_{6}	—	November 21, 2005	Kitt Peak	Spacewatch	CYB	4.4 km	MPC · JPL
397123	2005 WN_{16}	—	November 22, 2005	Kitt Peak	Spacewatch	·	2.8 km	MPC · JPL
397124	2005 WR_{30}	—	November 21, 2005	Kitt Peak	Spacewatch	·	700 m	MPC · JPL
397125	2005 WK_{31}	—	November 21, 2005	Kitt Peak	Spacewatch	·	4.4 km	MPC · JPL
397126	2005 WV_{31}	—	November 21, 2005	Kitt Peak	Spacewatch	·	770 m	MPC · JPL
397127	2005 WY_{37}	—	November 22, 2005	Kitt Peak	Spacewatch	·	3.2 km	MPC · JPL
397128	2005 WF_{42}	—	October 24, 2005	Kitt Peak	Spacewatch	·	2.2 km	MPC · JPL
397129	2005 WS_{42}	—	November 21, 2005	Kitt Peak	Spacewatch	·	960 m	MPC · JPL
397130	2005 WL_{46}	—	November 24, 2005	Palomar	NEAT	PHO	1.2 km	MPC · JPL
397131	2005 WS_{56}	—	November 29, 2005	Socorro	LINEAR	·	1.1 km	MPC · JPL
397132	2005 WM_{80}	—	November 25, 2005	Mount Lemmon	Mount Lemmon Survey	·	4.1 km	MPC · JPL
397133	2005 WW_{87}	—	November 28, 2005	Mount Lemmon	Mount Lemmon Survey	·	1.0 km	MPC · JPL
397134	2005 WO_{92}	—	November 25, 2005	Mount Lemmon	Mount Lemmon Survey	·	610 m	MPC · JPL
397135	2005 WW_{103}	—	November 10, 2005	Catalina	CSS	·	820 m	MPC · JPL
397136	2005 WR_{105}	—	October 29, 2005	Mount Lemmon	Mount Lemmon Survey	·	1.1 km	MPC · JPL
397137	2005 WD_{107}	—	November 25, 2005	Mount Lemmon	Mount Lemmon Survey	V	710 m	MPC · JPL
397138	2005 WZ_{111}	—	November 30, 2005	Mount Lemmon	Mount Lemmon Survey	TIR	3.8 km	MPC · JPL
397139	2005 WH_{118}	—	November 28, 2005	Catalina	CSS	·	980 m	MPC · JPL
397140	2005 WL_{130}	—	November 25, 2005	Mount Lemmon	Mount Lemmon Survey	·	700 m	MPC · JPL
397141	2005 WS_{131}	—	November 25, 2005	Mount Lemmon	Mount Lemmon Survey	EMA	4.4 km	MPC · JPL
397142	2005 WX_{135}	—	November 26, 2005	Kitt Peak	Spacewatch	·	2.8 km	MPC · JPL
397143	2005 WR_{140}	—	November 26, 2005	Mount Lemmon	Mount Lemmon Survey	·	4.0 km	MPC · JPL
397144	2005 WO_{153}	—	November 29, 2005	Kitt Peak	Spacewatch	·	710 m	MPC · JPL
397145	2005 WP_{161}	—	November 28, 2005	Mount Lemmon	Mount Lemmon Survey	·	2.2 km	MPC · JPL
397146	2005 WM_{162}	—	November 28, 2005	Mount Lemmon	Mount Lemmon Survey	·	2.0 km	MPC · JPL
397147	2005 WJ_{171}	—	November 30, 2005	Kitt Peak	Spacewatch	·	2.2 km	MPC · JPL
397148	2005 WK_{181}	—	November 25, 2005	Catalina	CSS	·	4.6 km	MPC · JPL
397149	2005 WV_{187}	—	November 29, 2005	Catalina	CSS	PHO	2.5 km	MPC · JPL
397150	2005 WA_{211}	—	November 26, 2005	Kitt Peak	Spacewatch	·	580 m	MPC · JPL
397151	2005 WG_{211}	—	November 21, 2005	Kitt Peak	Spacewatch	·	4.2 km	MPC · JPL
397152	2005 XL	—	December 1, 2005	Mount Lemmon	Mount Lemmon Survey	·	2.7 km	MPC · JPL
397153	2005 XS_{2}	—	December 1, 2005	Kitt Peak	Spacewatch	·	1.4 km	MPC · JPL
397154	2005 XK_{40}	—	December 5, 2005	Mount Lemmon	Mount Lemmon Survey	(2076)	970 m	MPC · JPL
397155	2005 XG_{41}	—	December 6, 2005	Kitt Peak	Spacewatch	·	1.1 km	MPC · JPL
397156	2005 XS_{43}	—	December 2, 2005	Kitt Peak	Spacewatch	·	570 m	MPC · JPL
397157	2005 XD_{54}	—	December 4, 2005	Catalina	CSS	T_{j} (2.96)	6.0 km	MPC · JPL
397158	2005 XP_{69}	—	December 6, 2005	Kitt Peak	Spacewatch	·	910 m	MPC · JPL
397159	2005 XR_{71}	—	December 6, 2005	Kitt Peak	Spacewatch	·	870 m	MPC · JPL
397160	2005 XA_{101}	—	December 1, 2005	Kitt Peak	M. W. Buie	·	880 m	MPC · JPL
397161	2005 XD_{115}	—	December 4, 2005	Mount Lemmon	Mount Lemmon Survey	·	5.4 km	MPC · JPL
397162	2005 YE_{6}	—	December 21, 2005	Kitt Peak	Spacewatch	·	900 m	MPC · JPL
397163	2005 YS_{22}	—	December 24, 2005	Kitt Peak	Spacewatch	MAS	700 m	MPC · JPL
397164	2005 YQ_{30}	—	December 22, 2005	Catalina	CSS	H	700 m	MPC · JPL
397165	2005 YX_{57}	—	December 24, 2005	Kitt Peak	Spacewatch	·	780 m	MPC · JPL
397166	2005 YW_{70}	—	November 25, 2005	Mount Lemmon	Mount Lemmon Survey	·	1.2 km	MPC · JPL
397167	2005 YY_{78}	—	December 24, 2005	Kitt Peak	Spacewatch	·	850 m	MPC · JPL
397168	2005 YA_{86}	—	December 25, 2005	Mount Lemmon	Mount Lemmon Survey	·	620 m	MPC · JPL
397169	2005 YC_{102}	—	December 25, 2005	Kitt Peak	Spacewatch	NYS	910 m	MPC · JPL
397170	2005 YD_{105}	—	December 25, 2005	Kitt Peak	Spacewatch	MAS	600 m	MPC · JPL
397171	2005 YD_{107}	—	December 2, 2005	Mount Lemmon	Mount Lemmon Survey	NYS	1.0 km	MPC · JPL
397172	2005 YS_{121}	—	December 2, 2005	Mount Lemmon	Mount Lemmon Survey	3:2	4.2 km	MPC · JPL
397173	2005 YC_{142}	—	December 28, 2005	Mount Lemmon	Mount Lemmon Survey	·	1.3 km	MPC · JPL
397174	2005 YF_{148}	—	December 25, 2005	Kitt Peak	Spacewatch	·	1.0 km	MPC · JPL
397175	2005 YR_{153}	—	December 29, 2005	Socorro	LINEAR	·	1.2 km	MPC · JPL
397176	2005 YG_{200}	—	December 26, 2005	Mount Lemmon	Mount Lemmon Survey	·	1.0 km	MPC · JPL
397177	2005 YS_{253}	—	December 29, 2005	Kitt Peak	Spacewatch	MAS	620 m	MPC · JPL
397178	2005 YV_{254}	—	December 30, 2005	Kitt Peak	Spacewatch	·	960 m	MPC · JPL
397179	2006 AR_{16}	—	January 5, 2006	Socorro	LINEAR	URS	5.6 km	MPC · JPL
397180	2006 AB_{17}	—	January 5, 2006	Kitt Peak	Spacewatch	MAS	500 m	MPC · JPL
397181	2006 AJ_{40}	—	January 7, 2006	Mount Lemmon	Mount Lemmon Survey	·	1.0 km	MPC · JPL
397182	2006 AZ_{40}	—	January 7, 2006	Kitt Peak	Spacewatch	·	3.6 km	MPC · JPL
397183	2006 AL_{51}	—	January 5, 2006	Kitt Peak	Spacewatch	·	920 m	MPC · JPL
397184	2006 AS_{54}	—	November 30, 2005	Mount Lemmon	Mount Lemmon Survey	·	1.5 km	MPC · JPL
397185	2006 BN_{17}	—	January 22, 2006	Mount Lemmon	Mount Lemmon Survey	·	1.8 km	MPC · JPL
397186	2006 BU_{21}	—	January 22, 2006	Mount Lemmon	Mount Lemmon Survey	·	850 m	MPC · JPL
397187	2006 BO_{22}	—	January 22, 2006	Mount Lemmon	Mount Lemmon Survey	·	770 m	MPC · JPL
397188	2006 BM_{32}	—	January 21, 2006	Mount Lemmon	Mount Lemmon Survey	·	4.1 km	MPC · JPL
397189	2006 BA_{47}	—	January 24, 2006	Socorro	LINEAR	H	560 m	MPC · JPL
397190	2006 BQ_{61}	—	January 22, 2006	Catalina	CSS	·	2.5 km	MPC · JPL
397191	2006 BR_{89}	—	January 25, 2006	Kitt Peak	Spacewatch	·	980 m	MPC · JPL
397192	2006 BZ_{114}	—	January 26, 2006	Kitt Peak	Spacewatch	·	1.0 km	MPC · JPL
397193	2006 BL_{115}	—	January 26, 2006	Kitt Peak	Spacewatch	NYS	1.1 km	MPC · JPL
397194	2006 BZ_{123}	—	March 26, 1995	Kitt Peak	Spacewatch	·	1.1 km	MPC · JPL
397195	2006 BO_{149}	—	January 23, 2006	Catalina	CSS	PHO	1.1 km	MPC · JPL
397196	2006 BN_{174}	—	January 27, 2006	Kitt Peak	Spacewatch	·	2.6 km	MPC · JPL
397197	2006 BL_{191}	—	January 30, 2006	Kitt Peak	Spacewatch	EUP	4.1 km	MPC · JPL
397198	2006 BB_{193}	—	January 30, 2006	Kitt Peak	Spacewatch	NYS	920 m	MPC · JPL
397199	2006 BF_{196}	—	January 30, 2006	Kitt Peak	Spacewatch	NYS	1.0 km	MPC · JPL
397200	2006 BR_{202}	—	January 31, 2006	Kitt Peak	Spacewatch	·	910 m	MPC · JPL

== 397201–397300 ==
back to top

Designation			Discovery			Properties		Ref
Permanent	Provisional	Named after	Date	Site	Discoverer(s)	Category	Diam.	Ref
397201	2006 BR_{223}	—	January 30, 2006	Kitt Peak	Spacewatch	·	950 m	MPC · JPL
397202	2006 BS_{258}	—	January 31, 2006	Mount Lemmon	Mount Lemmon Survey	·	930 m	MPC · JPL
397203	2006 BO_{279}	—	January 30, 2006	Kitt Peak	Spacewatch	MAS	640 m	MPC · JPL
397204	2006 BE_{283}	—	January 31, 2006	Kitt Peak	Spacewatch	·	830 m	MPC · JPL
397205	2006 CO_{18}	—	February 1, 2006	Kitt Peak	Spacewatch	·	1.1 km	MPC · JPL
397206	2006 DK_{21}	—	January 26, 2006	Mount Lemmon	Mount Lemmon Survey	·	1.3 km	MPC · JPL
397207	2006 DW_{121}	—	February 22, 2006	Anderson Mesa	LONEOS	·	2.1 km	MPC · JPL
397208	2006 DW_{190}	—	February 27, 2006	Kitt Peak	Spacewatch	NYS	1.2 km	MPC · JPL
397209	2006 DX_{215}	—	February 28, 2006	Mount Lemmon	Mount Lemmon Survey	·	1.2 km	MPC · JPL
397210	2006 EX_{2}	—	January 26, 2006	Mount Lemmon	Mount Lemmon Survey	·	1.3 km	MPC · JPL
397211	2006 FP_{27}	—	March 24, 2006	Mount Lemmon	Mount Lemmon Survey	·	2.0 km	MPC · JPL
397212	2006 FG_{46}	—	March 26, 2006	Anderson Mesa	LONEOS	·	1.3 km	MPC · JPL
397213	2006 FF_{54}	—	March 26, 2006	Mount Lemmon	Mount Lemmon Survey	NYS	1.0 km	MPC · JPL
397214	2006 GU_{37}	—	April 2, 2006	Kitt Peak	Deep Lens Survey	H	640 m	MPC · JPL
397215	2006 HV_{33}	—	March 25, 2006	Kitt Peak	Spacewatch	3:2	5.2 km	MPC · JPL
397216	2006 HT_{47}	—	April 24, 2006	Kitt Peak	Spacewatch	·	1.4 km	MPC · JPL
397217	2006 HU_{48}	—	April 24, 2006	Socorro	LINEAR	·	1.7 km	MPC · JPL
397218	2006 HH_{70}	—	April 8, 2006	Kitt Peak	Spacewatch	·	1.3 km	MPC · JPL
397219	2006 HY_{72}	—	April 25, 2006	Kitt Peak	Spacewatch	·	1.7 km	MPC · JPL
397220	2006 HY_{73}	—	April 25, 2006	Kitt Peak	Spacewatch	·	1.1 km	MPC · JPL
397221	2006 HH_{82}	—	April 26, 2006	Kitt Peak	Spacewatch	NYS	920 m	MPC · JPL
397222	2006 HB_{91}	—	April 29, 2006	Kitt Peak	Spacewatch	·	920 m	MPC · JPL
397223	2006 HF_{116}	—	April 26, 2006	Kitt Peak	Spacewatch	·	1.2 km	MPC · JPL
397224	2006 JZ_{21}	—	May 2, 2006	Kitt Peak	Spacewatch	MAR	950 m	MPC · JPL
397225	2006 JY_{36}	—	May 4, 2006	Kitt Peak	Spacewatch	·	950 m	MPC · JPL
397226	2006 KO_{24}	—	January 15, 2005	Catalina	CSS	·	2.0 km	MPC · JPL
397227	2006 KA_{42}	—	May 20, 2006	Kitt Peak	Spacewatch	EUN	1.0 km	MPC · JPL
397228	2006 KN_{42}	—	May 20, 2006	Mount Lemmon	Mount Lemmon Survey	·	1.5 km	MPC · JPL
397229	2006 KH_{52}	—	May 21, 2006	Kitt Peak	Spacewatch	·	1.4 km	MPC · JPL
397230	2006 KK_{57}	—	May 22, 2006	Kitt Peak	Spacewatch	·	990 m	MPC · JPL
397231	2006 KN_{70}	—	May 22, 2006	Kitt Peak	Spacewatch	·	870 m	MPC · JPL
397232	2006 KV_{82}	—	May 19, 2006	Mount Lemmon	Mount Lemmon Survey	·	1.1 km	MPC · JPL
397233	2006 KR_{89}	—	May 29, 2006	Mayhill	Lowe, A.	·	3.0 km	MPC · JPL
397234	2006 KW_{97}	—	May 2, 2006	Mount Lemmon	Mount Lemmon Survey	·	1.7 km	MPC · JPL
397235	2006 KR_{99}	—	May 27, 2006	Catalina	CSS	H	710 m	MPC · JPL
397236	2006 KS_{105}	—	April 20, 2006	Siding Spring	SSS	·	1.9 km	MPC · JPL
397237	2006 KZ_{112}	—	May 31, 2006	Catalina	CSS	T_{j} (2.57) · APO +1km	1.2 km	MPC · JPL
397238	2006 KY_{116}	—	May 7, 2006	Mount Lemmon	Mount Lemmon Survey	·	1.1 km	MPC · JPL
397239	2006 KA_{117}	—	May 29, 2006	Kitt Peak	Spacewatch	·	1.6 km	MPC · JPL
397240	2006 OL_{5}	—	July 19, 2006	Palomar	NEAT	JUN	1.1 km	MPC · JPL
397241	2006 OE_{13}	—	July 21, 2006	Catalina	CSS	·	1.5 km	MPC · JPL
397242	2006 PY_{16}	—	August 15, 2006	Palomar	NEAT	·	1.9 km	MPC · JPL
397243	2006 PZ_{25}	—	August 13, 2006	Palomar	NEAT	·	1.7 km	MPC · JPL
397244	2006 PT_{43}	—	August 13, 2006	Palomar	NEAT	EUN	1.3 km	MPC · JPL
397245	2006 QJ	—	August 16, 2006	Reedy Creek	J. Broughton	TIN	2.5 km	MPC · JPL
397246	2006 QE_{4}	—	August 18, 2006	Kitt Peak	Spacewatch	HOF	2.5 km	MPC · JPL
397247	2006 QQ_{9}	—	August 19, 2006	Kitt Peak	Spacewatch	·	2.3 km	MPC · JPL
397248	2006 QD_{23}	—	August 19, 2006	Palomar	NEAT	·	2.8 km	MPC · JPL
397249	2006 QX_{25}	—	August 19, 2006	Kitt Peak	Spacewatch	·	1.5 km	MPC · JPL
397250	2006 QS_{31}	—	August 8, 2006	Siding Spring	SSS	·	2.0 km	MPC · JPL
397251	2006 QS_{80}	—	February 5, 2000	Kitt Peak	Spacewatch	MAR	1.1 km	MPC · JPL
397252	2006 QY_{95}	—	August 16, 2006	Palomar	NEAT	BRG	1.8 km	MPC · JPL
397253	2006 QG_{98}	—	August 22, 2006	Palomar	NEAT	·	1.6 km	MPC · JPL
397254	2006 QG_{99}	—	August 23, 2006	Palomar	NEAT	·	1.1 km	MPC · JPL
397255	2006 QC_{111}	—	August 27, 2006	Lulin	Lin, H.-C., Q. Ye	·	1.9 km	MPC · JPL
397256	2006 QM_{120}	—	August 29, 2006	Catalina	CSS	·	2.5 km	MPC · JPL
397257	2006 QA_{130}	—	August 19, 2006	Palomar	NEAT	·	2.8 km	MPC · JPL
397258	2006 QL_{142}	—	August 18, 2006	Palomar	NEAT	·	1.8 km	MPC · JPL
397259	2006 QR_{159}	—	August 19, 2006	Kitt Peak	Spacewatch	MIS	2.1 km	MPC · JPL
397260	2006 RF	—	August 29, 2006	Anderson Mesa	LONEOS	·	2.5 km	MPC · JPL
397261	2006 RZ_{15}	—	September 14, 2006	Catalina	CSS	·	1.9 km	MPC · JPL
397262	2006 RN_{16}	—	September 14, 2006	Palomar	NEAT	T_{j} (2.82)	7.3 km	MPC · JPL
397263	2006 RG_{17}	—	September 14, 2006	Catalina	CSS	·	2.0 km	MPC · JPL
397264	2006 RV_{23}	—	September 13, 2006	Palomar	NEAT	(5)	1.3 km	MPC · JPL
397265	2006 RQ_{35}	—	September 14, 2006	Catalina	CSS	·	2.6 km	MPC · JPL
397266	2006 RT_{37}	—	September 12, 2006	Catalina	CSS	·	2.7 km	MPC · JPL
397267	2006 RS_{58}	—	September 15, 2006	Kitt Peak	Spacewatch	·	1.8 km	MPC · JPL
397268	2006 RB_{61}	—	September 15, 2006	Socorro	LINEAR	·	1.7 km	MPC · JPL
397269	2006 RE_{61}	—	July 21, 2006	Catalina	CSS	EUN	1.7 km	MPC · JPL
397270	2006 RG_{63}	—	September 14, 2006	Catalina	CSS	·	1.3 km	MPC · JPL
397271	2006 RT_{67}	—	September 15, 2006	Kitt Peak	Spacewatch	·	2.5 km	MPC · JPL
397272	2006 RS_{69}	—	September 15, 2006	Kitt Peak	Spacewatch	NEM	1.8 km	MPC · JPL
397273	2006 RA_{71}	—	September 15, 2006	Kitt Peak	Spacewatch	AGN	880 m	MPC · JPL
397274	2006 RL_{73}	—	September 15, 2006	Kitt Peak	Spacewatch	·	1.7 km	MPC · JPL
397275	2006 RP_{85}	—	September 15, 2006	Kitt Peak	Spacewatch	·	1.6 km	MPC · JPL
397276	2006 RO_{92}	—	September 15, 2006	Kitt Peak	Spacewatch	·	2.9 km	MPC · JPL
397277	2006 RV_{95}	—	September 15, 2006	Kitt Peak	Spacewatch	·	1.1 km	MPC · JPL
397278 Arvidson	2006 RE_{114}	Arvidson	September 14, 2006	Mauna Kea	Masiero, J.	·	1.7 km	MPC · JPL
397279 Bloomsburg	2006 RF_{118}	Bloomsburg	September 14, 2006	Mauna Kea	Masiero, J.	·	1.6 km	MPC · JPL
397280	2006 SW_{9}	—	May 2, 2006	Mount Lemmon	Mount Lemmon Survey	EUN	1.5 km	MPC · JPL
397281	2006 SR_{17}	—	September 17, 2006	Kitt Peak	Spacewatch	·	2.4 km	MPC · JPL
397282	2006 SF_{38}	—	September 18, 2006	Kitt Peak	Spacewatch	·	1.8 km	MPC · JPL
397283	2006 SP_{40}	—	September 18, 2006	Catalina	CSS	·	2.1 km	MPC · JPL
397284	2006 SN_{49}	—	September 19, 2006	Kitt Peak	Spacewatch	·	2.4 km	MPC · JPL
397285	2006 SZ_{50}	—	September 17, 2006	Catalina	CSS	·	2.7 km	MPC · JPL
397286	2006 SE_{51}	—	September 17, 2006	Catalina	CSS	·	2.1 km	MPC · JPL
397287	2006 SG_{54}	—	September 16, 2006	Catalina	CSS	·	2.0 km	MPC · JPL
397288	2006 SS_{79}	—	September 17, 2006	Catalina	CSS	JUN	1.5 km	MPC · JPL
397289	2006 SX_{83}	—	September 18, 2006	Kitt Peak	Spacewatch	HOF	2.0 km	MPC · JPL
397290	2006 SQ_{95}	—	September 18, 2006	Kitt Peak	Spacewatch	·	2.1 km	MPC · JPL
397291	2006 SG_{96}	—	September 18, 2006	Kitt Peak	Spacewatch	·	1.9 km	MPC · JPL
397292	2006 ST_{106}	—	September 19, 2006	Kitt Peak	Spacewatch	EUN	1 km	MPC · JPL
397293	2006 SX_{111}	—	September 22, 2006	Catalina	CSS	·	2.0 km	MPC · JPL
397294	2006 SK_{124}	—	September 19, 2006	Catalina	CSS	·	2.3 km	MPC · JPL
397295	2006 SO_{135}	—	September 20, 2006	Catalina	CSS	·	2.0 km	MPC · JPL
397296	2006 SH_{145}	—	September 19, 2006	Kitt Peak	Spacewatch	·	1.7 km	MPC · JPL
397297	2006 SV_{168}	—	September 25, 2006	Kitt Peak	Spacewatch	·	1.8 km	MPC · JPL
397298	2006 SH_{170}	—	September 25, 2006	Kitt Peak	Spacewatch	3:2	6.2 km	MPC · JPL
397299	2006 SP_{175}	—	September 25, 2006	Mount Lemmon	Mount Lemmon Survey	·	1.6 km	MPC · JPL
397300	2006 SH_{201}	—	September 24, 2006	Kitt Peak	Spacewatch	GEF	1.2 km	MPC · JPL

== 397301–397400 ==
back to top

Designation			Discovery			Properties		Ref
Permanent	Provisional	Named after	Date	Site	Discoverer(s)	Category	Diam.	Ref
397301	2006 SS_{201}	—	September 24, 2006	Kitt Peak	Spacewatch	·	1.0 km	MPC · JPL
397302	2006 SD_{216}	—	September 27, 2006	Kitt Peak	Spacewatch	·	1.7 km	MPC · JPL
397303	2006 SL_{226}	—	September 26, 2006	Kitt Peak	Spacewatch	·	1.9 km	MPC · JPL
397304	2006 SM_{234}	—	September 26, 2006	Kitt Peak	Spacewatch	·	1.7 km	MPC · JPL
397305	2006 SU_{243}	—	September 26, 2006	Kitt Peak	Spacewatch	·	1.8 km	MPC · JPL
397306	2006 SW_{245}	—	September 26, 2006	Mount Lemmon	Mount Lemmon Survey	·	1.5 km	MPC · JPL
397307	2006 SC_{246}	—	September 26, 2006	Mount Lemmon	Mount Lemmon Survey	·	1.9 km	MPC · JPL
397308	2006 SS_{247}	—	September 26, 2006	Mount Lemmon	Mount Lemmon Survey	·	1.9 km	MPC · JPL
397309	2006 SX_{267}	—	September 26, 2006	Kitt Peak	Spacewatch	·	1.3 km	MPC · JPL
397310	2006 SO_{268}	—	September 26, 2006	Kitt Peak	Spacewatch	EOS	2.1 km	MPC · JPL
397311	2006 SM_{274}	—	September 27, 2006	Mount Lemmon	Mount Lemmon Survey	·	1.5 km	MPC · JPL
397312	2006 SL_{290}	—	September 30, 2006	Anderson Mesa	LONEOS	JUN	1.2 km	MPC · JPL
397313	2006 SV_{330}	—	September 28, 2006	Mount Lemmon	Mount Lemmon Survey	AGN	1.0 km	MPC · JPL
397314	2006 SE_{361}	—	September 30, 2006	Mount Lemmon	Mount Lemmon Survey	·	1.8 km	MPC · JPL
397315	2006 SV_{366}	—	September 16, 2006	Catalina	CSS	EUN	1.5 km	MPC · JPL
397316	2006 SW_{381}	—	September 28, 2006	Apache Point	A. C. Becker	·	1.7 km	MPC · JPL
397317	2006 SO_{384}	—	September 29, 2006	Apache Point	SDSS Collaboration	·	1.9 km	MPC · JPL
397318	2006 SK_{390}	—	September 30, 2006	Apache Point	A. C. Becker	·	2.8 km	MPC · JPL
397319	2006 SO_{396}	—	September 17, 2006	Kitt Peak	Spacewatch	·	1.6 km	MPC · JPL
397320	2006 ST_{400}	—	September 25, 2006	Kitt Peak	Spacewatch	·	1.8 km	MPC · JPL
397321	2006 SC_{401}	—	September 27, 2006	Kitt Peak	Spacewatch	·	1.7 km	MPC · JPL
397322	2006 SU_{404}	—	September 30, 2006	Kitt Peak	Spacewatch	EMA	3.2 km	MPC · JPL
397323	2006 SQ_{410}	—	September 18, 2006	Kitt Peak	Spacewatch	·	1.7 km	MPC · JPL
397324	2006 SD_{413}	—	September 19, 2006	Catalina	CSS	·	2.4 km	MPC · JPL
397325	2006 TG	—	October 2, 2006	Mayhill	Lowe, A.	·	2.2 km	MPC · JPL
397326	2006 TC_{1}	—	October 3, 2006	Mount Lemmon	Mount Lemmon Survey	AMO	540 m	MPC · JPL
397327	2006 TM_{9}	—	October 11, 2006	Kitt Peak	Spacewatch	EUP	3.3 km	MPC · JPL
397328	2006 TN_{18}	—	October 11, 2006	Kitt Peak	Spacewatch	·	1.2 km	MPC · JPL
397329	2006 TV_{32}	—	October 12, 2006	Kitt Peak	Spacewatch	·	1.7 km	MPC · JPL
397330	2006 TZ_{32}	—	September 26, 2006	Mount Lemmon	Mount Lemmon Survey	·	1.6 km	MPC · JPL
397331	2006 TO_{55}	—	October 12, 2006	Palomar	NEAT	JUN	1.5 km	MPC · JPL
397332	2006 TA_{63}	—	September 20, 2006	Anderson Mesa	LONEOS	·	2.2 km	MPC · JPL
397333	2006 TG_{64}	—	October 10, 2006	Palomar	NEAT	·	1.6 km	MPC · JPL
397334	2006 TK_{67}	—	September 17, 2006	Catalina	CSS	·	3.7 km	MPC · JPL
397335	2006 TN_{67}	—	October 11, 2006	Kitt Peak	Spacewatch	·	2.0 km	MPC · JPL
397336	2006 TW_{67}	—	October 11, 2006	Palomar	NEAT	·	3.0 km	MPC · JPL
397337	2006 TQ_{72}	—	October 11, 2006	Palomar	NEAT	·	2.4 km	MPC · JPL
397338	2006 TG_{75}	—	October 11, 2006	Palomar	NEAT	·	2.2 km	MPC · JPL
397339	2006 TS_{88}	—	October 13, 2006	Kitt Peak	Spacewatch	·	1.3 km	MPC · JPL
397340	2006 TH_{90}	—	October 13, 2006	Kitt Peak	Spacewatch	·	1.3 km	MPC · JPL
397341	2006 TB_{96}	—	October 12, 2006	Palomar	NEAT	JUN	1.4 km	MPC · JPL
397342	2006 TK_{109}	—	October 4, 2006	Mount Lemmon	Mount Lemmon Survey	·	2.2 km	MPC · JPL
397343	2006 UQ_{1}	—	September 30, 2006	Catalina	CSS	·	1.7 km	MPC · JPL
397344	2006 UZ_{11}	—	October 17, 2006	Mount Lemmon	Mount Lemmon Survey	EUN	1.5 km	MPC · JPL
397345	2006 UN_{37}	—	October 3, 2006	Mount Lemmon	Mount Lemmon Survey	KOR	1.2 km	MPC · JPL
397346	2006 UR_{44}	—	October 16, 2006	Kitt Peak	Spacewatch	·	1.7 km	MPC · JPL
397347	2006 UQ_{63}	—	October 17, 2006	Kitami	K. Endate	·	3.2 km	MPC · JPL
397348	2006 UH_{70}	—	September 16, 2006	Catalina	CSS	·	3.7 km	MPC · JPL
397349	2006 UD_{71}	—	October 16, 2006	Catalina	CSS	JUN	1.2 km	MPC · JPL
397350	2006 UJ_{83}	—	October 17, 2006	Mount Lemmon	Mount Lemmon Survey	·	1.5 km	MPC · JPL
397351	2006 UK_{85}	—	October 17, 2006	Mount Lemmon	Mount Lemmon Survey	·	2.7 km	MPC · JPL
397352	2006 UZ_{88}	—	October 17, 2006	Kitt Peak	Spacewatch	(116763)	1.9 km	MPC · JPL
397353	2006 UW_{90}	—	October 17, 2006	Kitt Peak	Spacewatch	·	1.7 km	MPC · JPL
397354	2006 UQ_{94}	—	October 18, 2006	Kitt Peak	Spacewatch	·	1.4 km	MPC · JPL
397355	2006 UT_{97}	—	October 18, 2006	Kitt Peak	Spacewatch	EOS	2.3 km	MPC · JPL
397356	2006 UF_{98}	—	October 18, 2006	Kitt Peak	Spacewatch	BRA	1.5 km	MPC · JPL
397357	2006 UB_{103}	—	October 18, 2006	Kitt Peak	Spacewatch	·	1.8 km	MPC · JPL
397358	2006 UY_{114}	—	September 18, 2006	Kitt Peak	Spacewatch	·	1.5 km	MPC · JPL
397359	2006 UC_{119}	—	October 19, 2006	Kitt Peak	Spacewatch	·	2.3 km	MPC · JPL
397360	2006 UZ_{124}	—	October 19, 2006	Catalina	CSS	·	860 m	MPC · JPL
397361	2006 UL_{129}	—	September 27, 2006	Mount Lemmon	Mount Lemmon Survey	HOF	2.4 km	MPC · JPL
397362	2006 UA_{141}	—	October 19, 2006	Kitt Peak	Spacewatch	NAE	3.3 km	MPC · JPL
397363	2006 UW_{156}	—	October 21, 2006	Catalina	CSS	·	2.4 km	MPC · JPL
397364	2006 UE_{176}	—	October 16, 2006	Catalina	CSS	·	1.5 km	MPC · JPL
397365	2006 UG_{182}	—	October 16, 2006	Catalina	CSS	·	1.8 km	MPC · JPL
397366	2006 UX_{201}	—	October 22, 2006	Palomar	NEAT	·	3.2 km	MPC · JPL
397367	2006 UU_{204}	—	October 22, 2006	Palomar	NEAT	·	1.9 km	MPC · JPL
397368	2006 UN_{210}	—	October 23, 2006	Kitt Peak	Spacewatch	EOS	2.2 km	MPC · JPL
397369	2006 UD_{224}	—	October 19, 2006	Palomar	NEAT	·	2.1 km	MPC · JPL
397370	2006 UB_{242}	—	October 27, 2006	Kitt Peak	Spacewatch	·	1.6 km	MPC · JPL
397371	2006 UX_{247}	—	October 27, 2006	Mount Lemmon	Mount Lemmon Survey	·	1.3 km	MPC · JPL
397372	2006 UD_{263}	—	October 30, 2006	Marly	Observatoire Naef	·	2.6 km	MPC · JPL
397373	2006 UX_{270}	—	October 27, 2006	Mount Lemmon	Mount Lemmon Survey	·	2.2 km	MPC · JPL
397374	2006 UD_{276}	—	October 19, 2006	Kitt Peak	Spacewatch	HOF	2.2 km	MPC · JPL
397375	2006 UL_{328}	—	October 17, 2006	Mount Lemmon	Mount Lemmon Survey	·	3.7 km	MPC · JPL
397376	2006 UQ_{335}	—	October 17, 2006	Kitt Peak	Spacewatch	·	2.7 km	MPC · JPL
397377	2006 UW_{337}	—	October 22, 2006	Catalina	CSS	·	1.9 km	MPC · JPL
397378	2006 UJ_{338}	—	October 28, 2006	Mount Lemmon	Mount Lemmon Survey	·	3.2 km	MPC · JPL
397379	2006 UO_{358}	—	October 16, 2006	Kitt Peak	Spacewatch	KOR	1.1 km	MPC · JPL
397380	2006 UV_{359}	—	September 25, 2006	Mount Lemmon	Mount Lemmon Survey	·	2.3 km	MPC · JPL
397381	2006 UA_{361}	—	October 16, 2006	Catalina	CSS	·	3.4 km	MPC · JPL
397382	2006 VU_{3}	—	October 22, 2006	Kitt Peak	Spacewatch	·	1.6 km	MPC · JPL
397383	2006 VU_{44}	—	September 30, 2006	Mount Lemmon	Mount Lemmon Survey	·	2.5 km	MPC · JPL
397384	2006 VM_{53}	—	November 11, 2006	Kitt Peak	Spacewatch	·	2.0 km	MPC · JPL
397385	2006 VC_{54}	—	November 11, 2006	Kitt Peak	Spacewatch	EOS	1.6 km	MPC · JPL
397386	2006 VC_{56}	—	October 22, 2006	Mount Lemmon	Mount Lemmon Survey	·	1.9 km	MPC · JPL
397387	2006 VA_{61}	—	October 4, 2006	Mount Lemmon	Mount Lemmon Survey	·	2.2 km	MPC · JPL
397388	2006 VE_{67}	—	September 28, 2006	Mount Lemmon	Mount Lemmon Survey	NAE	2.5 km	MPC · JPL
397389	2006 VF_{67}	—	November 11, 2006	Kitt Peak	Spacewatch	·	3.0 km	MPC · JPL
397390	2006 VV_{76}	—	November 12, 2006	Mount Lemmon	Mount Lemmon Survey	BRA	1.5 km	MPC · JPL
397391	2006 VA_{97}	—	November 11, 2006	Kitt Peak	Spacewatch	·	1.6 km	MPC · JPL
397392	2006 VA_{100}	—	November 11, 2006	Catalina	CSS	·	3.9 km	MPC · JPL
397393	2006 VO_{105}	—	November 13, 2006	Kitt Peak	Spacewatch	·	2.4 km	MPC · JPL
397394	2006 VE_{106}	—	November 13, 2006	Catalina	CSS	·	2.5 km	MPC · JPL
397395	2006 VT_{116}	—	November 14, 2006	Kitt Peak	Spacewatch	·	1.6 km	MPC · JPL
397396	2006 VU_{136}	—	November 15, 2006	Kitt Peak	Spacewatch	·	1.9 km	MPC · JPL
397397	2006 WN_{16}	—	November 17, 2006	Kitt Peak	Spacewatch	·	2.1 km	MPC · JPL
397398	2006 WS_{33}	—	November 16, 2006	Kitt Peak	Spacewatch	·	2.6 km	MPC · JPL
397399	2006 WV_{66}	—	November 17, 2006	Mount Lemmon	Mount Lemmon Survey	·	2.2 km	MPC · JPL
397400	2006 WD_{72}	—	October 31, 2006	Mount Lemmon	Mount Lemmon Survey	KOR	1.4 km	MPC · JPL

== 397401–397500 ==
back to top

Designation			Discovery			Properties		Ref
Permanent	Provisional	Named after	Date	Site	Discoverer(s)	Category	Diam.	Ref
397401	2006 WF_{82}	—	November 18, 2006	Kitt Peak	Spacewatch	KOR	1.2 km	MPC · JPL
397402	2006 WY_{102}	—	November 19, 2006	Kitt Peak	Spacewatch	EOS	1.6 km	MPC · JPL
397403	2006 WL_{108}	—	November 19, 2006	Kitt Peak	Spacewatch	EOS	1.6 km	MPC · JPL
397404	2006 WL_{150}	—	November 20, 2006	Kitt Peak	Spacewatch	·	3.5 km	MPC · JPL
397405	2006 WS_{166}	—	November 15, 2006	Kitt Peak	Spacewatch	·	1.9 km	MPC · JPL
397406	2006 WK_{175}	—	November 23, 2006	Kitt Peak	Spacewatch	·	1.9 km	MPC · JPL
397407	2006 WC_{184}	—	November 25, 2006	Mount Lemmon	Mount Lemmon Survey	·	3.1 km	MPC · JPL
397408	2006 WL_{199}	—	November 19, 2006	Kitt Peak	Spacewatch	·	2.9 km	MPC · JPL
397409	2006 XB_{24}	—	December 12, 2006	Catalina	CSS	·	1.7 km	MPC · JPL
397410	2006 XJ_{35}	—	December 11, 2006	Kitt Peak	Spacewatch	·	4.1 km	MPC · JPL
397411	2006 XV_{52}	—	November 16, 2006	Mount Lemmon	Mount Lemmon Survey	·	2.9 km	MPC · JPL
397412	2006 YQ_{3}	—	October 23, 2006	Mount Lemmon	Mount Lemmon Survey	URS	3.2 km	MPC · JPL
397413	2006 YN_{25}	—	December 21, 2006	Kitt Peak	Spacewatch	EOS	2.2 km	MPC · JPL
397414	2006 YK_{27}	—	December 21, 2006	Kitt Peak	Spacewatch	·	3.4 km	MPC · JPL
397415	2006 YA_{33}	—	December 21, 2006	Kitt Peak	Spacewatch	·	2.9 km	MPC · JPL
397416	2006 YR_{36}	—	December 21, 2006	Kitt Peak	Spacewatch	·	2.4 km	MPC · JPL
397417	2006 YZ_{36}	—	December 21, 2006	Kitt Peak	Spacewatch	THB	3.6 km	MPC · JPL
397418	2006 YG_{40}	—	December 22, 2006	Kitt Peak	Spacewatch	EOS	2.0 km	MPC · JPL
397419	2006 YU_{42}	—	December 23, 2006	Catalina	CSS	GAL	1.9 km	MPC · JPL
397420	2006 YC_{50}	—	December 21, 2006	Kitt Peak	M. W. Buie	·	680 m	MPC · JPL
397421	2007 AO_{3}	—	October 29, 2005	Catalina	CSS	·	4.1 km	MPC · JPL
397422	2007 AB_{17}	—	November 1, 2006	Mount Lemmon	Mount Lemmon Survey	·	2.9 km	MPC · JPL
397423	2007 AW_{30}	—	January 9, 2007	Kitt Peak	Spacewatch	·	3.3 km	MPC · JPL
397424	2007 BF_{2}	—	January 16, 2007	Catalina	CSS	H	670 m	MPC · JPL
397425	2007 BU_{4}	—	January 17, 2007	Kitt Peak	Spacewatch	TIR	2.7 km	MPC · JPL
397426	2007 BB_{16}	—	January 17, 2007	Kitt Peak	Spacewatch	·	3.0 km	MPC · JPL
397427	2007 BK_{16}	—	January 17, 2007	Kitt Peak	Spacewatch	·	4.4 km	MPC · JPL
397428	2007 BZ_{42}	—	January 24, 2007	Mount Lemmon	Mount Lemmon Survey	·	600 m	MPC · JPL
397429	2007 BM_{80}	—	January 17, 2007	Kitt Peak	Spacewatch	VER	2.6 km	MPC · JPL
397430	2007 CA_{26}	—	February 9, 2007	Catalina	CSS	EOS	2.4 km	MPC · JPL
397431	2007 CB_{28}	—	November 27, 2006	Mount Lemmon	Mount Lemmon Survey	·	2.0 km	MPC · JPL
397432	2007 CF_{39}	—	January 27, 2007	Kitt Peak	Spacewatch	·	3.1 km	MPC · JPL
397433	2007 CG_{79}	—	February 10, 2007	Catalina	CSS	·	4.3 km	MPC · JPL
397434	2007 DE_{35}	—	February 17, 2007	Kitt Peak	Spacewatch	·	660 m	MPC · JPL
397435	2007 DJ_{46}	—	December 21, 2006	Mount Lemmon	Mount Lemmon Survey	·	3.1 km	MPC · JPL
397436	2007 DV_{49}	—	February 6, 2007	Kitt Peak	Spacewatch	·	4.0 km	MPC · JPL
397437	2007 DL_{61}	—	February 19, 2007	Catalina	CSS	PHO	1.1 km	MPC · JPL
397438	2007 DJ_{79}	—	February 23, 2007	Kitt Peak	Spacewatch	·	2.6 km	MPC · JPL
397439	2007 DK_{85}	—	February 21, 2007	Kitt Peak	Spacewatch	·	980 m	MPC · JPL
397440	2007 DV_{90}	—	January 28, 2007	Mount Lemmon	Mount Lemmon Survey	THM	2.6 km	MPC · JPL
397441	2007 EH_{1}	—	January 20, 2007	Siding Spring	SSS	·	1.2 km	MPC · JPL
397442	2007 EL_{1}	—	January 29, 2007	Kitt Peak	Spacewatch	·	640 m	MPC · JPL
397443	2007 EB_{9}	—	March 9, 2007	Mount Lemmon	Mount Lemmon Survey	·	800 m	MPC · JPL
397444	2007 EB_{29}	—	January 27, 2007	Mount Lemmon	Mount Lemmon Survey	·	2.8 km	MPC · JPL
397445	2007 ED_{47}	—	March 9, 2007	Kitt Peak	Spacewatch	·	830 m	MPC · JPL
397446	2007 EL_{76}	—	March 10, 2007	Kitt Peak	Spacewatch	·	3.6 km	MPC · JPL
397447	2007 EC_{98}	—	March 11, 2007	Kitt Peak	Spacewatch	·	640 m	MPC · JPL
397448	2007 EF_{123}	—	March 14, 2007	Mount Lemmon	Mount Lemmon Survey	·	800 m	MPC · JPL
397449	2007 EX_{145}	—	March 12, 2007	Mount Lemmon	Mount Lemmon Survey	·	690 m	MPC · JPL
397450	2007 ES_{149}	—	February 26, 2007	Mount Lemmon	Mount Lemmon Survey	·	2.7 km	MPC · JPL
397451	2007 EA_{189}	—	March 13, 2007	Mount Lemmon	Mount Lemmon Survey	·	3.3 km	MPC · JPL
397452	2007 EB_{197}	—	March 15, 2007	Kitt Peak	Spacewatch	·	650 m	MPC · JPL
397453	2007 FA_{12}	—	March 17, 2007	Anderson Mesa	LONEOS	·	650 m	MPC · JPL
397454	2007 FJ_{12}	—	March 17, 2007	Socorro	LINEAR	·	2.1 km	MPC · JPL
397455	2007 FW_{31}	—	March 20, 2007	Kitt Peak	Spacewatch	·	760 m	MPC · JPL
397456	2007 GE_{6}	—	April 14, 2007	Altschwendt	W. Ries	·	1.6 km	MPC · JPL
397457	2007 GR_{11}	—	November 6, 2002	Kitt Peak	Spacewatch	·	900 m	MPC · JPL
397458	2007 GB_{61}	—	April 15, 2007	Kitt Peak	Spacewatch	·	660 m	MPC · JPL
397459	2007 GS_{61}	—	March 14, 2007	Mount Lemmon	Mount Lemmon Survey	·	1.1 km	MPC · JPL
397460	2007 HU_{12}	—	March 14, 2007	Kitt Peak	Spacewatch	EUP	4.1 km	MPC · JPL
397461	2007 HY_{27}	—	April 18, 2007	Kitt Peak	Spacewatch	·	940 m	MPC · JPL
397462	2007 HY_{35}	—	April 19, 2007	Kitt Peak	Spacewatch	·	940 m	MPC · JPL
397463	2007 HC_{50}	—	November 1, 2005	Mount Lemmon	Mount Lemmon Survey	·	880 m	MPC · JPL
397464	2007 HU_{52}	—	April 20, 2007	Kitt Peak	Spacewatch	·	1.1 km	MPC · JPL
397465	2007 HW_{60}	—	April 20, 2007	Kitt Peak	Spacewatch	·	730 m	MPC · JPL
397466	2007 HL_{66}	—	April 22, 2007	Mount Lemmon	Mount Lemmon Survey	·	630 m	MPC · JPL
397467	2007 HX_{66}	—	April 22, 2007	Mount Lemmon	Mount Lemmon Survey	·	840 m	MPC · JPL
397468	2007 HS_{73}	—	October 21, 2001	Kitt Peak	Spacewatch	·	620 m	MPC · JPL
397469	2007 HR_{83}	—	April 11, 2007	Kitt Peak	Spacewatch	·	790 m	MPC · JPL
397470	2007 JN_{28}	—	April 15, 1993	Kitt Peak	Spacewatch	·	920 m	MPC · JPL
397471	2007 LV	—	June 9, 2007	Siding Spring	SSS	AMO +1km	820 m	MPC · JPL
397472	2007 MV_{9}	—	June 19, 2007	Kitt Peak	Spacewatch	·	1.6 km	MPC · JPL
397473	2007 OB_{2}	—	June 18, 2007	Catalina	CSS	·	1.3 km	MPC · JPL
397474	2007 PP_{6}	—	August 9, 2007	Siding Spring	SSS	APO +1km	1.3 km	MPC · JPL
397475	2007 PK_{21}	—	August 9, 2007	Socorro	LINEAR	·	1.4 km	MPC · JPL
397476	2007 PP_{26}	—	August 13, 2007	Socorro	LINEAR	ERI	1.7 km	MPC · JPL
397477	2007 PW_{34}	—	August 9, 2007	Kitt Peak	Spacewatch	MAS	830 m	MPC · JPL
397478	2007 PT_{45}	—	August 9, 2007	Kitt Peak	Spacewatch	MAS	740 m	MPC · JPL
397479	2007 QC_{2}	—	August 18, 2007	La Sagra	OAM	·	1.4 km	MPC · JPL
397480	2007 QK_{4}	—	August 10, 2007	Kitt Peak	Spacewatch	·	1.3 km	MPC · JPL
397481	2007 QA_{6}	—	August 21, 2007	Anderson Mesa	LONEOS	NYS	1.0 km	MPC · JPL
397482	2007 QD_{11}	—	August 23, 2007	Kitt Peak	Spacewatch	·	1.2 km	MPC · JPL
397483	2007 RB_{20}	—	September 14, 2007	Catalina	CSS	·	1.8 km	MPC · JPL
397484	2007 RY_{20}	—	September 3, 2007	Catalina	CSS	NYS	1.3 km	MPC · JPL
397485	2007 RT_{33}	—	September 5, 2007	Mount Lemmon	Mount Lemmon Survey	·	1.3 km	MPC · JPL
397486	2007 RD_{37}	—	September 8, 2007	Anderson Mesa	LONEOS	·	2.7 km	MPC · JPL
397487	2007 RO_{49}	—	September 9, 2007	Mount Lemmon	Mount Lemmon Survey	NYS	980 m	MPC · JPL
397488	2007 RF_{85}	—	September 10, 2007	Mount Lemmon	Mount Lemmon Survey	HNS	1.0 km	MPC · JPL
397489	2007 RJ_{85}	—	August 10, 2007	Kitt Peak	Spacewatch	·	3.3 km	MPC · JPL
397490	2007 RH_{108}	—	September 11, 2007	Kitt Peak	Spacewatch	·	1.4 km	MPC · JPL
397491	2007 RS_{131}	—	September 12, 2007	Mount Lemmon	Mount Lemmon Survey	·	1.1 km	MPC · JPL
397492	2007 RS_{138}	—	September 15, 2007	Lulin	LUSS	NYS	970 m	MPC · JPL
397493	2007 RE_{149}	—	September 12, 2007	Catalina	CSS	·	1.7 km	MPC · JPL
397494	2007 RJ_{169}	—	September 10, 2007	Kitt Peak	Spacewatch	·	1.2 km	MPC · JPL
397495	2007 RA_{174}	—	September 10, 2007	Kitt Peak	Spacewatch	(5)	1.2 km	MPC · JPL
397496	2007 RF_{270}	—	September 15, 2007	Mount Lemmon	Mount Lemmon Survey	KOR	1.4 km	MPC · JPL
397497	2007 RG_{282}	—	September 12, 2007	Catalina	CSS	H	560 m	MPC · JPL
397498	2007 RM_{285}	—	September 13, 2007	Kitt Peak	Spacewatch	·	680 m	MPC · JPL
397499	2007 RR_{298}	—	September 10, 2007	Mount Lemmon	Mount Lemmon Survey	·	1.8 km	MPC · JPL
397500	2007 RB_{312}	—	September 10, 2007	Catalina	CSS	·	1.3 km	MPC · JPL

== 397501–397600 ==
back to top

Designation			Discovery			Properties		Ref
Permanent	Provisional	Named after	Date	Site	Discoverer(s)	Category	Diam.	Ref
397501	2007 RR_{314}	—	September 3, 2007	Catalina	CSS	·	1.5 km	MPC · JPL
397502	2007 RM_{315}	—	September 11, 2007	Kitt Peak	Spacewatch	·	1.3 km	MPC · JPL
397503	2007 RR_{316}	—	September 9, 2007	Mount Lemmon	Mount Lemmon Survey	MAS	810 m	MPC · JPL
397504	2007 RE_{318}	—	September 11, 2007	Catalina	CSS	·	1.3 km	MPC · JPL
397505	2007 RL_{323}	—	September 3, 2007	Catalina	CSS	·	1.3 km	MPC · JPL
397506	2007 RP_{323}	—	September 10, 2007	Mount Lemmon	Mount Lemmon Survey	·	1.4 km	MPC · JPL
397507	2007 SH_{7}	—	September 18, 2007	Kitt Peak	Spacewatch	MAS	870 m	MPC · JPL
397508	2007 SM_{7}	—	September 18, 2007	Kitt Peak	Spacewatch	·	1.1 km	MPC · JPL
397509	2007 SX_{18}	—	September 18, 2007	Mount Lemmon	Mount Lemmon Survey	MAR	980 m	MPC · JPL
397510	2007 TB	—	October 1, 2007	Eskridge	G. Hug	·	1.1 km	MPC · JPL
397511	2007 TN_{21}	—	October 9, 2007	Dauban	Chante-Perdrix	H	470 m	MPC · JPL
397512	2007 TB_{24}	—	March 8, 2005	Mount Lemmon	Mount Lemmon Survey	·	1.8 km	MPC · JPL
397513	2007 TV_{35}	—	September 10, 2007	Mount Lemmon	Mount Lemmon Survey	·	2.0 km	MPC · JPL
397514	2007 TG_{46}	—	October 7, 2007	Catalina	CSS	H	580 m	MPC · JPL
397515	2007 TV_{47}	—	October 4, 2007	Kitt Peak	Spacewatch	·	1.0 km	MPC · JPL
397516	2007 TR_{52}	—	October 4, 2007	Kitt Peak	Spacewatch	MAR	880 m	MPC · JPL
397517	2007 TK_{62}	—	October 7, 2007	Mount Lemmon	Mount Lemmon Survey	·	1.1 km	MPC · JPL
397518	2007 TS_{75}	—	September 12, 2007	Mount Lemmon	Mount Lemmon Survey	MAS	650 m	MPC · JPL
397519	2007 TN_{83}	—	October 8, 2007	Mount Lemmon	Mount Lemmon Survey	·	1.1 km	MPC · JPL
397520	2007 TT_{87}	—	October 8, 2007	Mount Lemmon	Mount Lemmon Survey	HNS	1.3 km	MPC · JPL
397521	2007 TQ_{104}	—	October 8, 2007	Mount Lemmon	Mount Lemmon Survey	·	1.2 km	MPC · JPL
397522	2007 TZ_{116}	—	October 9, 2007	Anderson Mesa	LONEOS	·	1.3 km	MPC · JPL
397523	2007 TH_{124}	—	October 6, 2007	Kitt Peak	Spacewatch	·	1.6 km	MPC · JPL
397524	2007 TN_{127}	—	October 6, 2007	Kitt Peak	Spacewatch	V	630 m	MPC · JPL
397525	2007 TK_{174}	—	October 4, 2007	Catalina	CSS	·	1.2 km	MPC · JPL
397526	2007 TN_{174}	—	October 4, 2007	Catalina	CSS	·	1.2 km	MPC · JPL
397527	2007 TX_{174}	—	October 4, 2007	Kitt Peak	Spacewatch	·	1.2 km	MPC · JPL
397528	2007 TF_{187}	—	September 12, 2007	Mount Lemmon	Mount Lemmon Survey	·	1.2 km	MPC · JPL
397529	2007 TX_{193}	—	October 7, 2007	Catalina	CSS	·	1.2 km	MPC · JPL
397530	2007 TA_{197}	—	August 10, 2007	Kitt Peak	Spacewatch	MAS	630 m	MPC · JPL
397531	2007 TB_{204}	—	May 3, 2005	Kitt Peak	Spacewatch	·	2.0 km	MPC · JPL
397532	2007 TL_{212}	—	October 7, 2007	Kitt Peak	Spacewatch	·	2.2 km	MPC · JPL
397533	2007 TD_{217}	—	October 7, 2007	Kitt Peak	Spacewatch	·	1.3 km	MPC · JPL
397534	2007 TC_{223}	—	September 8, 2007	Mount Lemmon	Mount Lemmon Survey	MAR	1.1 km	MPC · JPL
397535	2007 TF_{246}	—	October 9, 2007	Kitt Peak	Spacewatch	·	1.2 km	MPC · JPL
397536	2007 TV_{255}	—	October 10, 2007	Kitt Peak	Spacewatch	·	2.3 km	MPC · JPL
397537	2007 TD_{261}	—	October 10, 2007	Kitt Peak	Spacewatch	·	1.6 km	MPC · JPL
397538	2007 TH_{266}	—	October 12, 2007	Kitt Peak	Spacewatch	·	830 m	MPC · JPL
397539	2007 TN_{286}	—	September 26, 1995	Kitt Peak	Spacewatch	·	1.8 km	MPC · JPL
397540	2007 TP_{288}	—	October 11, 2007	Catalina	CSS	·	1.3 km	MPC · JPL
397541	2007 TW_{288}	—	September 12, 2007	Catalina	CSS	·	1.8 km	MPC · JPL
397542	2007 TU_{300}	—	October 12, 2007	Kitt Peak	Spacewatch	·	2.0 km	MPC · JPL
397543	2007 TV_{302}	—	October 12, 2007	Kitt Peak	Spacewatch	·	930 m	MPC · JPL
397544	2007 TE_{312}	—	October 11, 2007	Mount Lemmon	Mount Lemmon Survey	NYS	950 m	MPC · JPL
397545	2007 TA_{318}	—	October 12, 2007	Kitt Peak	Spacewatch	·	2.1 km	MPC · JPL
397546	2007 TL_{319}	—	October 12, 2007	Kitt Peak	Spacewatch	KON	2.3 km	MPC · JPL
397547	2007 TP_{327}	—	October 11, 2007	Kitt Peak	Spacewatch	·	1.4 km	MPC · JPL
397548	2007 TS_{333}	—	October 11, 2007	Kitt Peak	Spacewatch	·	1.3 km	MPC · JPL
397549	2007 TG_{334}	—	October 11, 2007	Kitt Peak	Spacewatch	·	1.3 km	MPC · JPL
397550	2007 TH_{334}	—	October 11, 2007	Kitt Peak	Spacewatch	(5)	1.1 km	MPC · JPL
397551	2007 TY_{360}	—	October 15, 2007	Mount Lemmon	Mount Lemmon Survey	·	1.4 km	MPC · JPL
397552	2007 TN_{367}	—	October 10, 2007	Catalina	CSS	EUN	1.5 km	MPC · JPL
397553	2007 TS_{373}	—	October 14, 2007	Mount Lemmon	Mount Lemmon Survey	MAR	1.3 km	MPC · JPL
397554	2007 TJ_{376}	—	October 15, 2007	Mount Lemmon	Mount Lemmon Survey	H	680 m	MPC · JPL
397555	2007 TH_{383}	—	October 14, 2007	Kitt Peak	Spacewatch	·	1.5 km	MPC · JPL
397556	2007 TL_{385}	—	October 15, 2007	Catalina	CSS	·	1.3 km	MPC · JPL
397557	2007 TG_{388}	—	September 12, 2007	Mount Lemmon	Mount Lemmon Survey	·	1.0 km	MPC · JPL
397558	2007 TP_{389}	—	September 18, 2007	Anderson Mesa	LONEOS	·	2.6 km	MPC · JPL
397559	2007 TT_{422}	—	October 10, 2007	Mount Lemmon	Mount Lemmon Survey	ADE	2.5 km	MPC · JPL
397560	2007 TU_{426}	—	October 9, 2007	Kitt Peak	Spacewatch	·	2.7 km	MPC · JPL
397561	2007 TN_{431}	—	October 14, 2007	Mount Lemmon	Mount Lemmon Survey	·	1.3 km	MPC · JPL
397562	2007 TV_{438}	—	October 10, 2007	Mount Lemmon	Mount Lemmon Survey	·	1.1 km	MPC · JPL
397563	2007 TB_{445}	—	October 12, 2007	Socorro	LINEAR	HNS	1.2 km	MPC · JPL
397564	2007 UJ_{9}	—	October 17, 2007	Anderson Mesa	LONEOS	·	1.3 km	MPC · JPL
397565	2007 UM_{10}	—	October 18, 2007	Catalina	CSS	·	1.3 km	MPC · JPL
397566	2007 UP_{13}	—	October 17, 2007	Catalina	CSS	EUN	1.5 km	MPC · JPL
397567	2007 UA_{14}	—	October 16, 2007	Mount Lemmon	Mount Lemmon Survey	·	940 m	MPC · JPL
397568	2007 UT_{32}	—	October 19, 2007	Catalina	CSS	H	530 m	MPC · JPL
397569	2007 UZ_{32}	—	August 24, 2007	Kitt Peak	Spacewatch	EUN	1.7 km	MPC · JPL
397570	2007 UN_{51}	—	September 13, 2007	Mount Lemmon	Mount Lemmon Survey	H	600 m	MPC · JPL
397571	2007 UG_{53}	—	October 30, 2007	Kitt Peak	Spacewatch	·	1.2 km	MPC · JPL
397572	2007 UJ_{65}	—	September 9, 2007	Mount Lemmon	Mount Lemmon Survey	EUN	1.3 km	MPC · JPL
397573	2007 UK_{86}	—	October 12, 2007	Kitt Peak	Spacewatch	MAR	770 m	MPC · JPL
397574	2007 UM_{89}	—	October 30, 2007	Mount Lemmon	Mount Lemmon Survey	·	1.1 km	MPC · JPL
397575	2007 UX_{101}	—	October 30, 2007	Kitt Peak	Spacewatch	·	1.7 km	MPC · JPL
397576	2007 UO_{112}	—	October 30, 2007	Mount Lemmon	Mount Lemmon Survey	·	1.3 km	MPC · JPL
397577	2007 UZ_{119}	—	October 30, 2007	Mount Lemmon	Mount Lemmon Survey	EUN	840 m	MPC · JPL
397578	2007 UB_{123}	—	October 31, 2007	Mount Lemmon	Mount Lemmon Survey	·	920 m	MPC · JPL
397579	2007 UU_{126}	—	October 17, 2007	Mount Lemmon	Mount Lemmon Survey	·	1.5 km	MPC · JPL
397580	2007 UK_{127}	—	October 30, 2007	Kitt Peak	Spacewatch	·	1.3 km	MPC · JPL
397581	2007 US_{127}	—	October 19, 2007	Kitt Peak	Spacewatch	·	990 m	MPC · JPL
397582	2007 US_{131}	—	October 17, 2007	Mount Lemmon	Mount Lemmon Survey	V	690 m	MPC · JPL
397583	2007 UR_{140}	—	October 19, 2007	Catalina	CSS	·	1.1 km	MPC · JPL
397584	2007 UU_{141}	—	October 21, 2007	Mount Lemmon	Mount Lemmon Survey	·	1.5 km	MPC · JPL
397585	2007 VX_{4}	—	October 8, 2007	Mount Lemmon	Mount Lemmon Survey	·	1.4 km	MPC · JPL
397586	2007 VF_{5}	—	October 14, 2007	Catalina	CSS	·	2.0 km	MPC · JPL
397587	2007 VB_{7}	—	September 10, 2007	Catalina	CSS	·	1.1 km	MPC · JPL
397588	2007 VS_{7}	—	November 2, 2007	7300	W. K. Y. Yeung	·	1.2 km	MPC · JPL
397589	2007 VV_{8}	—	October 19, 2007	Catalina	CSS	H	590 m	MPC · JPL
397590	2007 VU_{29}	—	November 1, 2007	Kitt Peak	Spacewatch	·	2.3 km	MPC · JPL
397591	2007 VE_{45}	—	October 9, 2007	Kitt Peak	Spacewatch	·	1.8 km	MPC · JPL
397592	2007 VF_{46}	—	November 1, 2007	Kitt Peak	Spacewatch	·	2.4 km	MPC · JPL
397593	2007 VG_{46}	—	November 1, 2007	Kitt Peak	Spacewatch	(5)	1.5 km	MPC · JPL
397594	2007 VP_{52}	—	November 1, 2007	Kitt Peak	Spacewatch	·	2.0 km	MPC · JPL
397595	2007 VS_{54}	—	September 9, 2007	Mount Lemmon	Mount Lemmon Survey	·	1.5 km	MPC · JPL
397596	2007 VC_{63}	—	October 15, 2007	Mount Lemmon	Mount Lemmon Survey	·	1.2 km	MPC · JPL
397597	2007 VJ_{71}	—	November 2, 2007	Kitt Peak	Spacewatch	H	520 m	MPC · JPL
397598	2007 VU_{71}	—	November 5, 2007	Socorro	LINEAR	H	650 m	MPC · JPL
397599	2007 VY_{83}	—	November 5, 2007	La Sagra	OAM	(5)	1.2 km	MPC · JPL
397600	2007 VQ_{86}	—	November 2, 2007	Socorro	LINEAR	HNS	1.4 km	MPC · JPL

== 397601–397700 ==
back to top

Designation			Discovery			Properties		Ref
Permanent	Provisional	Named after	Date	Site	Discoverer(s)	Category	Diam.	Ref
397601	2007 VP_{95}	—	November 8, 2007	Socorro	LINEAR	H	700 m	MPC · JPL
397602	2007 VZ_{95}	—	November 7, 2007	Bisei SG Center	BATTeRS	·	910 m	MPC · JPL
397603	2007 VN_{125}	—	October 21, 2007	Catalina	CSS	·	1.8 km	MPC · JPL
397604	2007 VC_{128}	—	October 20, 2007	Kitt Peak	Spacewatch	·	1.5 km	MPC · JPL
397605	2007 VD_{155}	—	November 5, 2007	Kitt Peak	Spacewatch	NEM	2.1 km	MPC · JPL
397606	2007 VQ_{157}	—	October 20, 2007	Mount Lemmon	Mount Lemmon Survey	·	1.5 km	MPC · JPL
397607	2007 VZ_{159}	—	November 5, 2007	Kitt Peak	Spacewatch	·	2.2 km	MPC · JPL
397608	2007 VX_{165}	—	November 5, 2007	Kitt Peak	Spacewatch	·	1.4 km	MPC · JPL
397609	2007 VV_{169}	—	November 5, 2007	Kitt Peak	Spacewatch	·	1.0 km	MPC · JPL
397610	2007 VC_{173}	—	November 2, 2007	Mount Lemmon	Mount Lemmon Survey	·	1.2 km	MPC · JPL
397611	2007 VV_{188}	—	November 12, 2007	Socorro	LINEAR	H	560 m	MPC · JPL
397612	2007 VM_{212}	—	November 5, 2007	Kitt Peak	Spacewatch	·	1.7 km	MPC · JPL
397613	2007 VB_{224}	—	October 30, 2007	Kitt Peak	Spacewatch	(5)	1.2 km	MPC · JPL
397614	2007 VM_{241}	—	November 12, 2007	Catalina	CSS	·	1.7 km	MPC · JPL
397615	2007 VX_{255}	—	November 5, 2007	Kitt Peak	Spacewatch	·	1.1 km	MPC · JPL
397616	2007 VY_{256}	—	December 28, 2003	Kitt Peak	Spacewatch	·	1.7 km	MPC · JPL
397617	2007 VW_{260}	—	November 13, 2007	Kitt Peak	Spacewatch	·	2.3 km	MPC · JPL
397618	2007 VH_{278}	—	October 10, 2007	Mount Lemmon	Mount Lemmon Survey	·	1.8 km	MPC · JPL
397619	2007 VH_{307}	—	November 2, 2007	Kitt Peak	Spacewatch	·	1.9 km	MPC · JPL
397620	2007 VE_{309}	—	November 9, 2007	Kitt Peak	Spacewatch	·	960 m	MPC · JPL
397621	2007 VR_{316}	—	November 6, 2007	Mount Lemmon	Mount Lemmon Survey	·	2.3 km	MPC · JPL
397622	2007 VL_{321}	—	November 12, 2007	Catalina	CSS	·	2.2 km	MPC · JPL
397623	2007 VQ_{323}	—	November 7, 2007	Catalina	CSS	·	2.4 km	MPC · JPL
397624	2007 VL_{324}	—	November 7, 2007	Socorro	LINEAR	·	2.6 km	MPC · JPL
397625	2007 VZ_{324}	—	November 9, 2007	Catalina	CSS	·	1.5 km	MPC · JPL
397626	2007 VK_{325}	—	November 2, 2007	Kitt Peak	Spacewatch	·	1.1 km	MPC · JPL
397627	2007 VL_{328}	—	November 8, 2007	Kitt Peak	Spacewatch	KON	3.2 km	MPC · JPL
397628	2007 VL_{329}	—	November 15, 2007	Socorro	LINEAR	EUN	1.9 km	MPC · JPL
397629	2007 VE_{332}	—	November 7, 2007	Mount Lemmon	Mount Lemmon Survey	·	2.9 km	MPC · JPL
397630	2007 WR_{4}	—	November 20, 2007	Mount Lemmon	Mount Lemmon Survey	H	510 m	MPC · JPL
397631	2007 WO_{22}	—	October 18, 2007	Kitt Peak	Spacewatch	KON	2.8 km	MPC · JPL
397632	2007 WR_{22}	—	October 9, 2007	Kitt Peak	Spacewatch	WIT	1.1 km	MPC · JPL
397633	2007 WF_{42}	—	November 3, 2007	Kitt Peak	Spacewatch	·	1.7 km	MPC · JPL
397634	2007 WW_{60}	—	November 16, 2007	Mount Lemmon	Mount Lemmon Survey	·	2.2 km	MPC · JPL
397635	2007 WE_{63}	—	November 19, 2007	Mount Lemmon	Mount Lemmon Survey	·	2.5 km	MPC · JPL
397636	2007 XY	—	December 1, 2007	Lulin	LUSS	H	620 m	MPC · JPL
397637	2007 XH_{5}	—	November 3, 2007	Catalina	CSS	·	1.4 km	MPC · JPL
397638	2007 XH_{6}	—	September 27, 2007	Mount Lemmon	Mount Lemmon Survey	·	2.5 km	MPC · JPL
397639	2007 XY_{10}	—	December 4, 2007	Mount Lemmon	Mount Lemmon Survey	·	1.7 km	MPC · JPL
397640	2007 XH_{17}	—	November 2, 2007	Mount Lemmon	Mount Lemmon Survey	·	2.0 km	MPC · JPL
397641	2007 XK_{18}	—	December 3, 2007	Catalina	CSS	H	560 m	MPC · JPL
397642	2007 XZ_{24}	—	December 15, 2007	Kitt Peak	Spacewatch	AEO	1.5 km	MPC · JPL
397643	2007 XG_{36}	—	December 13, 2007	Socorro	LINEAR	ADE	2.5 km	MPC · JPL
397644	2007 XW_{36}	—	November 3, 2007	Kitt Peak	Spacewatch	·	1.9 km	MPC · JPL
397645	2007 XH_{43}	—	November 13, 2007	Kitt Peak	Spacewatch	·	2.1 km	MPC · JPL
397646	2007 XD_{48}	—	December 15, 2007	Kitt Peak	Spacewatch	MRX	1.1 km	MPC · JPL
397647	2007 XZ_{49}	—	December 3, 2007	Kitt Peak	Spacewatch	AGN	1.3 km	MPC · JPL
397648	2007 XC_{55}	—	December 5, 2007	Kitt Peak	Spacewatch	·	2.5 km	MPC · JPL
397649	2007 XW_{56}	—	December 4, 2007	Kitt Peak	Spacewatch	MRX	1.2 km	MPC · JPL
397650	2007 YK_{5}	—	November 1, 2007	Kitt Peak	Spacewatch	·	1.8 km	MPC · JPL
397651	2007 YV_{8}	—	December 16, 2007	Mount Lemmon	Mount Lemmon Survey	·	3.6 km	MPC · JPL
397652	2007 YV_{9}	—	December 16, 2007	Mount Lemmon	Mount Lemmon Survey	·	1.9 km	MPC · JPL
397653	2007 YJ_{26}	—	November 7, 2007	Mount Lemmon	Mount Lemmon Survey	·	1.3 km	MPC · JPL
397654	2007 YU_{39}	—	December 30, 2007	Mount Lemmon	Mount Lemmon Survey	·	2.1 km	MPC · JPL
397655	2007 YN_{44}	—	December 30, 2007	Kitt Peak	Spacewatch	·	1.9 km	MPC · JPL
397656	2007 YV_{62}	—	December 30, 2007	Mount Lemmon	Mount Lemmon Survey	·	3.1 km	MPC · JPL
397657	2007 YN_{63}	—	December 31, 2007	Kitt Peak	Spacewatch	·	1.9 km	MPC · JPL
397658	2007 YJ_{71}	—	December 19, 2007	Mount Lemmon	Mount Lemmon Survey	·	2.3 km	MPC · JPL
397659	2007 YS_{72}	—	December 19, 2007	Mount Lemmon	Mount Lemmon Survey	·	2.4 km	MPC · JPL
397660	2008 AM	—	January 1, 2008	Kitt Peak	Spacewatch	·	2.7 km	MPC · JPL
397661	2008 AB_{14}	—	January 10, 2008	Mount Lemmon	Mount Lemmon Survey	·	1.7 km	MPC · JPL
397662	2008 AJ_{14}	—	December 31, 2007	Kitt Peak	Spacewatch	·	2.3 km	MPC · JPL
397663	2008 AZ_{17}	—	January 10, 2008	Kitt Peak	Spacewatch	·	2.0 km	MPC · JPL
397664	2008 AC_{32}	—	January 11, 2008	Kitt Peak	Spacewatch	·	1.8 km	MPC · JPL
397665	2008 AF_{33}	—	January 12, 2008	Catalina	CSS	H	730 m	MPC · JPL
397666	2008 AS_{33}	—	January 5, 2008	XuYi	PMO NEO Survey Program	H	510 m	MPC · JPL
397667	2008 AU_{35}	—	January 10, 2008	Kitt Peak	Spacewatch	H	720 m	MPC · JPL
397668	2008 AM_{37}	—	December 31, 2007	Kitt Peak	Spacewatch	EOS	2.2 km	MPC · JPL
397669	2008 AB_{59}	—	January 11, 2008	Kitt Peak	Spacewatch	·	1.8 km	MPC · JPL
397670	2008 AC_{63}	—	December 30, 2007	Kitt Peak	Spacewatch	·	2.6 km	MPC · JPL
397671	2008 AM_{71}	—	December 30, 2007	Kitt Peak	Spacewatch	·	1.8 km	MPC · JPL
397672	2008 AN_{72}	—	January 14, 2008	Kitt Peak	Spacewatch	·	2.5 km	MPC · JPL
397673	2008 AX_{74}	—	January 11, 2008	Kitt Peak	Spacewatch	·	1.5 km	MPC · JPL
397674	2008 AO_{94}	—	January 14, 2008	Kitt Peak	Spacewatch	·	1.7 km	MPC · JPL
397675	2008 AK_{96}	—	January 14, 2008	Kitt Peak	Spacewatch	·	3.6 km	MPC · JPL
397676	2008 AM_{99}	—	January 14, 2008	Kitt Peak	Spacewatch	·	5.8 km	MPC · JPL
397677	2008 AP_{106}	—	October 19, 2007	Mount Lemmon	Mount Lemmon Survey	·	3.5 km	MPC · JPL
397678	2008 AY_{107}	—	January 15, 2008	Kitt Peak	Spacewatch	·	1.8 km	MPC · JPL
397679	2008 AH_{129}	—	January 10, 2008	Kitt Peak	Spacewatch	·	1.4 km	MPC · JPL
397680	2008 BE_{1}	—	November 7, 2007	Mount Lemmon	Mount Lemmon Survey	·	3.4 km	MPC · JPL
397681	2008 BT_{13}	—	January 19, 2008	Kitt Peak	Spacewatch	·	2.4 km	MPC · JPL
397682	2008 BB_{28}	—	December 30, 2007	Mount Lemmon	Mount Lemmon Survey	·	2.1 km	MPC · JPL
397683	2008 BC_{45}	—	January 31, 2008	Catalina	CSS	·	2.8 km	MPC · JPL
397684	2008 BG_{46}	—	January 30, 2008	Mount Lemmon	Mount Lemmon Survey	·	2.0 km	MPC · JPL
397685	2008 BQ_{50}	—	January 31, 2008	Mount Lemmon	Mount Lemmon Survey	EMA	2.6 km	MPC · JPL
397686	2008 CT	—	February 2, 2008	Winterthur	M. Griesser	H	620 m	MPC · JPL
397687	2008 CZ_{16}	—	February 3, 2008	Kitt Peak	Spacewatch	·	3.2 km	MPC · JPL
397688	2008 CS_{33}	—	February 2, 2008	Kitt Peak	Spacewatch	·	2.2 km	MPC · JPL
397689	2008 CN_{43}	—	November 14, 2007	Mount Lemmon	Mount Lemmon Survey	·	1.8 km	MPC · JPL
397690	2008 CE_{76}	—	February 3, 2008	Kitt Peak	Spacewatch	·	2.1 km	MPC · JPL
397691	2008 CX_{115}	—	February 10, 2008	Mount Lemmon	Mount Lemmon Survey	·	2.3 km	MPC · JPL
397692	2008 CH_{117}	—	February 10, 2008	Mount Lemmon	Mount Lemmon Survey	·	1.9 km	MPC · JPL
397693	2008 CR_{120}	—	February 6, 2008	Catalina	CSS	H	700 m	MPC · JPL
397694	2008 CC_{130}	—	February 8, 2008	Kitt Peak	Spacewatch	·	3.0 km	MPC · JPL
397695	2008 CM_{132}	—	February 8, 2008	Kitt Peak	Spacewatch	·	2.4 km	MPC · JPL
397696	2008 CK_{139}	—	January 10, 2008	Kitt Peak	Spacewatch	·	2.0 km	MPC · JPL
397697	2008 CD_{150}	—	February 9, 2008	Kitt Peak	Spacewatch	·	1.9 km	MPC · JPL
397698	2008 CB_{152}	—	February 9, 2008	Kitt Peak	Spacewatch	·	1.8 km	MPC · JPL
397699	2008 CH_{154}	—	February 9, 2008	Kitt Peak	Spacewatch	·	2.3 km	MPC · JPL
397700	2008 CL_{187}	—	February 3, 2008	Catalina	CSS	LIX	3.7 km	MPC · JPL

== 397701–397800 ==
back to top

Designation			Discovery			Properties		Ref
Permanent	Provisional	Named after	Date	Site	Discoverer(s)	Category	Diam.	Ref
397701	2008 CS_{187}	—	January 12, 2008	Catalina	CSS	H	650 m	MPC · JPL
397702	2008 CF_{189}	—	February 13, 2008	Catalina	CSS	·	3.3 km	MPC · JPL
397703	2008 CG_{191}	—	February 2, 2008	Kitt Peak	Spacewatch	·	2.0 km	MPC · JPL
397704	2008 CF_{194}	—	February 10, 2008	Mount Lemmon	Mount Lemmon Survey	·	2.2 km	MPC · JPL
397705	2008 CC_{197}	—	February 8, 2008	Kitt Peak	Spacewatch	·	2.0 km	MPC · JPL
397706	2008 CK_{197}	—	February 8, 2008	Kitt Peak	Spacewatch	·	2.3 km	MPC · JPL
397707	2008 CX_{200}	—	February 10, 2008	Mount Lemmon	Mount Lemmon Survey	·	2.6 km	MPC · JPL
397708	2008 CG_{203}	—	February 10, 2008	Mount Lemmon	Mount Lemmon Survey	·	2.6 km	MPC · JPL
397709	2008 CW_{206}	—	February 11, 2008	Mount Lemmon	Mount Lemmon Survey	·	1.7 km	MPC · JPL
397710	2008 CT_{207}	—	February 8, 2008	Kitt Peak	Spacewatch	·	1.5 km	MPC · JPL
397711	2008 CN_{213}	—	February 9, 2008	Kitt Peak	Spacewatch	·	2.8 km	MPC · JPL
397712	2008 CA_{214}	—	February 10, 2008	Kitt Peak	Spacewatch	·	2.4 km	MPC · JPL
397713	2008 DF_{8}	—	February 11, 2008	Kitt Peak	Spacewatch	TEL	1.2 km	MPC · JPL
397714	2008 DJ_{20}	—	January 30, 2008	Mount Lemmon	Mount Lemmon Survey	·	1.7 km	MPC · JPL
397715	2008 DW_{25}	—	February 29, 2008	Purple Mountain	PMO NEO Survey Program	·	2.0 km	MPC · JPL
397716	2008 DA_{27}	—	February 29, 2008	Catalina	CSS	·	2.8 km	MPC · JPL
397717	2008 DA_{42}	—	January 12, 2008	Kitt Peak	Spacewatch	·	1.8 km	MPC · JPL
397718	2008 DZ_{45}	—	February 28, 2008	Catalina	CSS	·	4.9 km	MPC · JPL
397719	2008 DY_{52}	—	February 29, 2008	Mount Lemmon	Mount Lemmon Survey	·	2.6 km	MPC · JPL
397720	2008 DG_{54}	—	December 20, 2007	Mount Lemmon	Mount Lemmon Survey	·	1.7 km	MPC · JPL
397721	2008 DC_{69}	—	February 29, 2008	Kitt Peak	Spacewatch	·	3.2 km	MPC · JPL
397722	2008 DH_{87}	—	February 28, 2008	Kitt Peak	Spacewatch	·	3.6 km	MPC · JPL
397723	2008 EJ_{13}	—	October 22, 2005	Kitt Peak	Spacewatch	·	2.3 km	MPC · JPL
397724	2008 EL_{13}	—	February 10, 2008	Kitt Peak	Spacewatch	·	2.4 km	MPC · JPL
397725	2008 ES_{24}	—	March 3, 2008	Mount Lemmon	Mount Lemmon Survey	·	2.6 km	MPC · JPL
397726	2008 EN_{26}	—	March 4, 2008	Kitt Peak	Spacewatch	·	2.0 km	MPC · JPL
397727	2008 EG_{33}	—	March 1, 2008	Kitt Peak	Spacewatch	·	2.2 km	MPC · JPL
397728	2008 ED_{54}	—	October 25, 2005	Kitt Peak	Spacewatch	VER	3.1 km	MPC · JPL
397729	2008 EL_{69}	—	January 20, 2008	Mount Lemmon	Mount Lemmon Survey	·	4.5 km	MPC · JPL
397730	2008 ES_{76}	—	March 7, 2008	Kitt Peak	Spacewatch	THM	2.1 km	MPC · JPL
397731	2008 EC_{86}	—	February 7, 2008	Mount Lemmon	Mount Lemmon Survey	·	2.9 km	MPC · JPL
397732	2008 EA_{100}	—	March 6, 2008	Catalina	CSS	·	3.2 km	MPC · JPL
397733	2008 EU_{110}	—	March 8, 2008	Kitt Peak	Spacewatch	·	3.3 km	MPC · JPL
397734	2008 EM_{117}	—	March 8, 2008	Kitt Peak	Spacewatch	THM	2.3 km	MPC · JPL
397735	2008 EW_{120}	—	March 9, 2008	Kitt Peak	Spacewatch	·	2.8 km	MPC · JPL
397736	2008 ER_{134}	—	March 11, 2008	Kitt Peak	Spacewatch	·	2.4 km	MPC · JPL
397737	2008 EV_{134}	—	March 11, 2008	Kitt Peak	Spacewatch	THM	2.4 km	MPC · JPL
397738	2008 ET_{156}	—	March 10, 2008	Mount Lemmon	Mount Lemmon Survey	T_{j} (2.99) · EUP	3.9 km	MPC · JPL
397739	2008 EK_{161}	—	March 8, 2008	Mount Lemmon	Mount Lemmon Survey	THM	1.8 km	MPC · JPL
397740	2008 EF_{166}	—	March 5, 2008	Mount Lemmon	Mount Lemmon Survey	·	3.9 km	MPC · JPL
397741	2008 FT_{5}	—	March 28, 2008	Altschwendt	W. Ries	T_{j} (2.89)	3.7 km	MPC · JPL
397742	2008 FP_{14}	—	March 26, 2008	Mount Lemmon	Mount Lemmon Survey	·	3.9 km	MPC · JPL
397743	2008 FN_{18}	—	February 1, 2008	Kitt Peak	Spacewatch	·	2.3 km	MPC · JPL
397744	2008 FQ_{22}	—	March 27, 2008	Kitt Peak	Spacewatch	·	2.9 km	MPC · JPL
397745	2008 FX_{23}	—	March 27, 2008	Kitt Peak	Spacewatch	·	2.5 km	MPC · JPL
397746	2008 FP_{53}	—	March 28, 2008	Mount Lemmon	Mount Lemmon Survey	·	2.7 km	MPC · JPL
397747	2008 FL_{54}	—	February 12, 2008	Mount Lemmon	Mount Lemmon Survey	·	2.6 km	MPC · JPL
397748	2008 FQ_{55}	—	March 28, 2008	Mount Lemmon	Mount Lemmon Survey	EOS	3.4 km	MPC · JPL
397749	2008 FU_{59}	—	March 29, 2008	Kitt Peak	Spacewatch	·	2.8 km	MPC · JPL
397750	2008 FW_{88}	—	March 28, 2008	Kitt Peak	Spacewatch	·	3.3 km	MPC · JPL
397751	2008 FB_{90}	—	January 30, 2008	Mount Lemmon	Mount Lemmon Survey	·	2.0 km	MPC · JPL
397752	2008 FG_{101}	—	March 30, 2008	Kitt Peak	Spacewatch	·	3.0 km	MPC · JPL
397753	2008 FV_{108}	—	March 31, 2008	Mount Lemmon	Mount Lemmon Survey	·	1.9 km	MPC · JPL
397754	2008 FF_{113}	—	March 1, 2008	Kitt Peak	Spacewatch	·	2.4 km	MPC · JPL
397755	2008 FZ_{113}	—	March 31, 2008	Kitt Peak	Spacewatch	·	3.0 km	MPC · JPL
397756	2008 FK_{117}	—	March 31, 2008	Kitt Peak	Spacewatch	·	2.6 km	MPC · JPL
397757	2008 FS_{117}	—	March 31, 2008	Kitt Peak	Spacewatch	·	4.0 km	MPC · JPL
397758	2008 FE_{134}	—	March 29, 2008	Kitt Peak	Spacewatch	·	3.4 km	MPC · JPL
397759	2008 FD_{135}	—	March 31, 2008	Kitt Peak	Spacewatch	·	2.7 km	MPC · JPL
397760	2008 GS_{9}	—	April 1, 2008	Kitt Peak	Spacewatch	EOS	1.9 km	MPC · JPL
397761	2008 GD_{13}	—	April 3, 2008	Mount Lemmon	Mount Lemmon Survey	·	3.1 km	MPC · JPL
397762	2008 GJ_{13}	—	April 3, 2008	Mount Lemmon	Mount Lemmon Survey	·	3.1 km	MPC · JPL
397763	2008 GA_{18}	—	March 5, 2008	Mount Lemmon	Mount Lemmon Survey	·	2.7 km	MPC · JPL
397764	2008 GE_{40}	—	February 11, 2008	Mount Lemmon	Mount Lemmon Survey	·	2.1 km	MPC · JPL
397765	2008 GY_{49}	—	April 5, 2008	Kitt Peak	Spacewatch	ARM	4.5 km	MPC · JPL
397766	2008 GX_{73}	—	April 7, 2008	Kitt Peak	Spacewatch	·	3.3 km	MPC · JPL
397767	2008 GF_{77}	—	April 7, 2008	Kitt Peak	Spacewatch	·	3.2 km	MPC · JPL
397768	2008 GZ_{85}	—	February 27, 2008	Kitt Peak	Spacewatch	EOS	2.1 km	MPC · JPL
397769	2008 GW_{91}	—	April 6, 2008	Mount Lemmon	Mount Lemmon Survey	THM	2.1 km	MPC · JPL
397770	2008 GU_{100}	—	April 9, 2008	Kitt Peak	Spacewatch	·	3.3 km	MPC · JPL
397771	2008 GQ_{117}	—	April 11, 2008	Kitt Peak	Spacewatch	·	3.1 km	MPC · JPL
397772	2008 GC_{130}	—	April 4, 2008	Kitt Peak	Spacewatch	·	3.5 km	MPC · JPL
397773	2008 GF_{132}	—	April 8, 2008	Kitt Peak	Spacewatch	·	3.5 km	MPC · JPL
397774	2008 HP_{5}	—	April 24, 2008	Kitt Peak	Spacewatch	·	2.9 km	MPC · JPL
397775	2008 HO_{13}	—	April 25, 2008	Kitt Peak	Spacewatch	·	3.5 km	MPC · JPL
397776	2008 HY_{18}	—	April 26, 2008	Mount Lemmon	Mount Lemmon Survey	·	3.2 km	MPC · JPL
397777	2008 HO_{21}	—	April 5, 2008	Kitt Peak	Spacewatch	·	4.2 km	MPC · JPL
397778	2008 HM_{22}	—	April 26, 2008	Kitt Peak	Spacewatch	LUT	4.1 km	MPC · JPL
397779	2008 HV_{23}	—	April 27, 2008	Kitt Peak	Spacewatch	·	5.7 km	MPC · JPL
397780	2008 HK_{26}	—	March 29, 2008	Kitt Peak	Spacewatch	·	3.4 km	MPC · JPL
397781	2008 HX_{26}	—	April 27, 2008	Mount Lemmon	Mount Lemmon Survey	THM	2.3 km	MPC · JPL
397782	2008 HN_{37}	—	April 15, 2008	Mount Lemmon	Mount Lemmon Survey	EOS	2.0 km	MPC · JPL
397783	2008 HJ_{38}	—	October 28, 2005	Kitt Peak	Spacewatch	·	2.9 km	MPC · JPL
397784	2008 HT_{40}	—	April 26, 2008	Mount Lemmon	Mount Lemmon Survey	·	2.5 km	MPC · JPL
397785	2008 HJ_{41}	—	March 28, 2008	Mount Lemmon	Mount Lemmon Survey	·	3.3 km	MPC · JPL
397786	2008 HE_{60}	—	April 14, 2002	Socorro	LINEAR	·	3.0 km	MPC · JPL
397787	2008 JV_{20}	—	May 8, 2008	Mount Lemmon	Mount Lemmon Survey	TIR	3.2 km	MPC · JPL
397788	2008 JP_{21}	—	April 3, 2008	Mount Lemmon	Mount Lemmon Survey	·	2.9 km	MPC · JPL
397789	2008 JP_{22}	—	May 6, 2008	Siding Spring	SSS	T_{j} (2.97)	5.6 km	MPC · JPL
397790	2008 JR_{29}	—	April 15, 2008	Kitt Peak	Spacewatch	L5	7.5 km	MPC · JPL
397791	2008 JD_{37}	—	May 13, 2008	Mount Lemmon	Mount Lemmon Survey	·	4.2 km	MPC · JPL
397792	2008 JY_{40}	—	November 27, 2006	Mount Lemmon	Mount Lemmon Survey	·	3.0 km	MPC · JPL
397793	2008 KN_{15}	—	May 27, 2008	Kitt Peak	Spacewatch	·	3.9 km	MPC · JPL
397794	2008 KH_{39}	—	May 30, 2008	Kitt Peak	Spacewatch	·	2.6 km	MPC · JPL
397795	2008 LZ_{7}	—	April 6, 2008	Mount Lemmon	Mount Lemmon Survey	·	2.7 km	MPC · JPL
397796	2008 LS_{14}	—	May 15, 2008	Mount Lemmon	Mount Lemmon Survey	·	4.8 km	MPC · JPL
397797	2008 MZ_{2}	—	June 30, 2008	Kitt Peak	Spacewatch	·	3.5 km	MPC · JPL
397798	2008 PD	—	August 1, 2008	Hibiscus	S. F. Hönig, Teamo, N.	·	800 m	MPC · JPL
397799	2008 PE_{5}	—	August 4, 2008	La Sagra	OAM	THB	3.7 km	MPC · JPL
397800 Costaillobera	2008 PX_{9}	Costaillobera	August 4, 2008	La Sagra	OAM	·	4.5 km	MPC · JPL

== 397801–397900 ==
back to top

Designation			Discovery			Properties		Ref
Permanent	Provisional	Named after	Date	Site	Discoverer(s)	Category	Diam.	Ref
397801	2008 QA_{19}	—	August 29, 2008	Dauban	Kugel, F.	·	810 m	MPC · JPL
397802	2008 QU_{21}	—	August 26, 2008	Socorro	LINEAR	·	1.0 km	MPC · JPL
397803	2008 QQ_{38}	—	August 24, 2008	Kitt Peak	Spacewatch	·	840 m	MPC · JPL
397804	2008 QV_{46}	—	August 30, 2008	Socorro	LINEAR	·	740 m	MPC · JPL
397805	2008 RJ_{25}	—	September 4, 2008	Goodricke-Pigott	R. A. Tucker	·	950 m	MPC · JPL
397806	2008 RQ_{35}	—	September 2, 2008	Kitt Peak	Spacewatch	V	550 m	MPC · JPL
397807	2008 RH_{45}	—	August 23, 2008	Kitt Peak	Spacewatch	·	930 m	MPC · JPL
397808	2008 RM_{45}	—	September 2, 2008	Kitt Peak	Spacewatch	·	880 m	MPC · JPL
397809	2008 RS_{62}	—	September 4, 2008	Kitt Peak	Spacewatch	·	700 m	MPC · JPL
397810	2008 RQ_{81}	—	September 4, 2008	Kitt Peak	Spacewatch	·	680 m	MPC · JPL
397811	2008 RG_{86}	—	September 5, 2008	Kitt Peak	Spacewatch	V	620 m	MPC · JPL
397812	2008 RO_{86}	—	September 5, 2008	Kitt Peak	Spacewatch	·	810 m	MPC · JPL
397813	2008 RJ_{95}	—	September 7, 2008	Catalina	CSS	·	690 m	MPC · JPL
397814	2008 RF_{96}	—	July 30, 2008	Kitt Peak	Spacewatch	·	610 m	MPC · JPL
397815	2008 RA_{107}	—	September 7, 2008	Mount Lemmon	Mount Lemmon Survey	·	730 m	MPC · JPL
397816	2008 RF_{131}	—	September 9, 2008	Mount Lemmon	Mount Lemmon Survey	·	1.1 km	MPC · JPL
397817	2008 RW_{134}	—	September 6, 2008	Catalina	CSS	·	640 m	MPC · JPL
397818	2008 SN_{2}	—	September 22, 2008	Junk Bond	D. Healy	NYS	1.0 km	MPC · JPL
397819	2008 SP_{9}	—	September 22, 2008	Socorro	LINEAR	·	840 m	MPC · JPL
397820	2008 SX_{53}	—	September 20, 2008	Mount Lemmon	Mount Lemmon Survey	·	620 m	MPC · JPL
397821	2008 SP_{72}	—	September 22, 2008	Kitt Peak	Spacewatch	·	650 m	MPC · JPL
397822	2008 SB_{96}	—	September 21, 2008	Kitt Peak	Spacewatch	·	680 m	MPC · JPL
397823	2008 SD_{119}	—	September 22, 2008	Mount Lemmon	Mount Lemmon Survey	·	690 m	MPC · JPL
397824	2008 SO_{122}	—	September 22, 2008	Mount Lemmon	Mount Lemmon Survey	·	1.1 km	MPC · JPL
397825	2008 SF_{130}	—	September 22, 2008	Kitt Peak	Spacewatch	·	1.2 km	MPC · JPL
397826	2008 SC_{133}	—	September 22, 2008	Kitt Peak	Spacewatch	·	610 m	MPC · JPL
397827	2008 SP_{148}	—	September 29, 2008	Mount Lemmon	Mount Lemmon Survey	·	1.1 km	MPC · JPL
397828	2008 SB_{150}	—	September 6, 2008	Mount Lemmon	Mount Lemmon Survey	·	670 m	MPC · JPL
397829	2008 SV_{152}	—	September 22, 2008	Socorro	LINEAR	·	760 m	MPC · JPL
397830	2008 SE_{157}	—	September 24, 2008	Socorro	LINEAR	·	640 m	MPC · JPL
397831	2008 SH_{160}	—	September 20, 2008	Kitt Peak	Spacewatch	·	740 m	MPC · JPL
397832	2008 SQ_{170}	—	September 21, 2008	Mount Lemmon	Mount Lemmon Survey	·	560 m	MPC · JPL
397833	2008 SC_{176}	—	September 23, 2008	Kitt Peak	Spacewatch	·	730 m	MPC · JPL
397834	2008 SL_{182}	—	September 24, 2008	Kitt Peak	Spacewatch	·	1.1 km	MPC · JPL
397835	2008 ST_{182}	—	September 24, 2008	Mount Lemmon	Mount Lemmon Survey	·	720 m	MPC · JPL
397836	2008 SE_{189}	—	September 25, 2008	Mount Lemmon	Mount Lemmon Survey	·	770 m	MPC · JPL
397837	2008 SL_{238}	—	September 21, 2008	Kitt Peak	Spacewatch	NYS	1.3 km	MPC · JPL
397838	2008 SY_{241}	—	September 29, 2008	Catalina	CSS	·	750 m	MPC · JPL
397839	2008 SF_{248}	—	September 20, 2008	Kitt Peak	Spacewatch	NYS	1.2 km	MPC · JPL
397840	2008 SP_{258}	—	September 22, 2008	Mount Lemmon	Mount Lemmon Survey	·	1.8 km	MPC · JPL
397841	2008 SY_{271}	—	September 28, 2008	Mount Lemmon	Mount Lemmon Survey	·	650 m	MPC · JPL
397842	2008 SQ_{281}	—	September 23, 2008	Mount Lemmon	Mount Lemmon Survey	·	1.3 km	MPC · JPL
397843	2008 SM_{282}	—	September 22, 2008	Catalina	CSS	·	1.0 km	MPC · JPL
397844	2008 SL_{302}	—	September 23, 2008	Kitt Peak	Spacewatch	·	1.0 km	MPC · JPL
397845	2008 SY_{309}	—	September 29, 2008	Mount Lemmon	Mount Lemmon Survey	·	1.3 km	MPC · JPL
397846	2008 TS	—	October 1, 2008	Hibiscus	S. F. Hönig, Teamo, N.	·	680 m	MPC · JPL
397847	2008 TA_{1}	—	October 2, 2008	Kitt Peak	Spacewatch	APO	650 m	MPC · JPL
397848	2008 TV_{21}	—	September 21, 2008	Mount Lemmon	Mount Lemmon Survey	HNS	990 m	MPC · JPL
397849	2008 TD_{40}	—	October 1, 2008	Mount Lemmon	Mount Lemmon Survey	·	710 m	MPC · JPL
397850	2008 TR_{44}	—	October 1, 2008	Mount Lemmon	Mount Lemmon Survey	NYS	990 m	MPC · JPL
397851	2008 TB_{47}	—	October 1, 2008	Kitt Peak	Spacewatch	·	1.6 km	MPC · JPL
397852	2008 TZ_{49}	—	September 24, 2008	Kitt Peak	Spacewatch	·	1.2 km	MPC · JPL
397853	2008 TG_{50}	—	September 7, 2008	Mount Lemmon	Mount Lemmon Survey	·	620 m	MPC · JPL
397854	2008 TD_{69}	—	October 2, 2008	Kitt Peak	Spacewatch	·	920 m	MPC · JPL
397855	2008 TF_{90}	—	October 3, 2008	Mount Lemmon	Mount Lemmon Survey	V	640 m	MPC · JPL
397856	2008 TZ_{109}	—	October 6, 2008	Mount Lemmon	Mount Lemmon Survey	(5)	1.4 km	MPC · JPL
397857	2008 TF_{114}	—	October 6, 2008	Kitt Peak	Spacewatch	·	1.2 km	MPC · JPL
397858	2008 TD_{115}	—	October 6, 2008	Catalina	CSS	·	670 m	MPC · JPL
397859	2008 TE_{134}	—	September 23, 2008	Kitt Peak	Spacewatch	·	590 m	MPC · JPL
397860	2008 TO_{135}	—	September 7, 2008	Catalina	CSS	·	870 m	MPC · JPL
397861	2008 TL_{148}	—	October 16, 2001	Kitt Peak	Spacewatch	·	1.0 km	MPC · JPL
397862	2008 TT_{167}	—	October 10, 2008	Kitt Peak	Spacewatch	·	1.1 km	MPC · JPL
397863	2008 TQ_{169}	—	October 7, 2008	Kitt Peak	Spacewatch	MAS	740 m	MPC · JPL
397864	2008 TB_{175}	—	September 23, 2008	Kitt Peak	Spacewatch	·	960 m	MPC · JPL
397865	2008 UD_{3}	—	September 24, 2008	Mount Lemmon	Mount Lemmon Survey	PHO	1.2 km	MPC · JPL
397866	2008 UQ_{29}	—	October 20, 2008	Kitt Peak	Spacewatch	·	1.3 km	MPC · JPL
397867	2008 UP_{34}	—	October 20, 2008	Kitt Peak	Spacewatch	·	1.2 km	MPC · JPL
397868	2008 UR_{40}	—	October 20, 2008	Kitt Peak	Spacewatch	NYS	1.2 km	MPC · JPL
397869	2008 UB_{41}	—	October 20, 2008	Kitt Peak	Spacewatch	MAS	710 m	MPC · JPL
397870	2008 UH_{41}	—	October 20, 2008	Kitt Peak	Spacewatch	·	1.3 km	MPC · JPL
397871	2008 UX_{51}	—	October 3, 2008	Mount Lemmon	Mount Lemmon Survey	·	1.3 km	MPC · JPL
397872	2008 UK_{52}	—	October 20, 2008	Kitt Peak	Spacewatch	·	600 m	MPC · JPL
397873	2008 UQ_{59}	—	October 8, 2008	Mount Lemmon	Mount Lemmon Survey	·	1.7 km	MPC · JPL
397874	2008 UH_{65}	—	October 21, 2008	Kitt Peak	Spacewatch	(5)	1.3 km	MPC · JPL
397875	2008 UR_{77}	—	October 21, 2008	Kitt Peak	Spacewatch	V	720 m	MPC · JPL
397876	2008 UZ_{88}	—	April 25, 2007	Kitt Peak	Spacewatch	·	1.1 km	MPC · JPL
397877	2008 UV_{89}	—	September 23, 2008	Kitt Peak	Spacewatch	·	1.0 km	MPC · JPL
397878	2008 US_{92}	—	October 24, 2008	Socorro	LINEAR	V	780 m	MPC · JPL
397879	2008 UC_{100}	—	October 27, 2008	Bisei SG Center	BATTeRS	·	610 m	MPC · JPL
397880	2008 UM_{112}	—	October 22, 2008	Kitt Peak	Spacewatch	·	1.4 km	MPC · JPL
397881	2008 UR_{119}	—	October 22, 2008	Kitt Peak	Spacewatch	PHO	1.2 km	MPC · JPL
397882	2008 UM_{123}	—	October 22, 2008	Kitt Peak	Spacewatch	·	750 m	MPC · JPL
397883	2008 UA_{136}	—	October 23, 2008	Kitt Peak	Spacewatch	·	1.1 km	MPC · JPL
397884	2008 UT_{145}	—	October 23, 2008	Kitt Peak	Spacewatch	·	1.4 km	MPC · JPL
397885	2008 UL_{146}	—	October 23, 2008	Kitt Peak	Spacewatch	·	790 m	MPC · JPL
397886	2008 UY_{168}	—	October 24, 2008	Kitt Peak	Spacewatch	·	1.2 km	MPC · JPL
397887	2008 UZ_{173}	—	October 24, 2008	Catalina	CSS	·	1.3 km	MPC · JPL
397888	2008 UC_{175}	—	October 24, 2008	Kitt Peak	Spacewatch	MAS	710 m	MPC · JPL
397889	2008 UW_{187}	—	October 24, 2008	Kitt Peak	Spacewatch	·	680 m	MPC · JPL
397890	2008 UX_{202}	—	October 27, 2008	Great Shefford	Birtwhistle, P.	·	550 m	MPC · JPL
397891	2008 UM_{203}	—	October 28, 2008	Socorro	LINEAR	(2076)	880 m	MPC · JPL
397892	2008 UN_{226}	—	October 25, 2008	Mount Lemmon	Mount Lemmon Survey	V	650 m	MPC · JPL
397893	2008 UJ_{228}	—	October 25, 2008	Kitt Peak	Spacewatch	·	3.7 km	MPC · JPL
397894	2008 US_{230}	—	October 26, 2008	Kitt Peak	Spacewatch	·	520 m	MPC · JPL
397895	2008 UP_{257}	—	October 27, 2008	Kitt Peak	Spacewatch	NYS	980 m	MPC · JPL
397896	2008 UE_{261}	—	December 28, 2005	Mount Lemmon	Mount Lemmon Survey	·	1.1 km	MPC · JPL
397897	2008 UX_{262}	—	October 27, 2008	Kitt Peak	Spacewatch	·	1.3 km	MPC · JPL
397898	2008 US_{263}	—	October 27, 2008	Kitt Peak	Spacewatch	NYS	1.1 km	MPC · JPL
397899	2008 UB_{267}	—	September 28, 2008	Mount Lemmon	Mount Lemmon Survey	·	820 m	MPC · JPL
397900	2008 UD_{270}	—	October 28, 2008	Kitt Peak	Spacewatch	·	710 m	MPC · JPL

== 397901–398000 ==
back to top

Designation			Discovery			Properties		Ref
Permanent	Provisional	Named after	Date	Site	Discoverer(s)	Category	Diam.	Ref
397901	2008 UE_{277}	—	October 28, 2008	Mount Lemmon	Mount Lemmon Survey	·	800 m	MPC · JPL
397902	2008 UL_{289}	—	October 28, 2008	Kitt Peak	Spacewatch	PHO	800 m	MPC · JPL
397903	2008 UF_{321}	—	September 23, 2008	Kitt Peak	Spacewatch	·	1.0 km	MPC · JPL
397904	2008 UE_{322}	—	October 31, 2008	Mount Lemmon	Mount Lemmon Survey	V	720 m	MPC · JPL
397905	2008 UN_{329}	—	October 31, 2008	Kitt Peak	Spacewatch	NYS	910 m	MPC · JPL
397906	2008 UF_{338}	—	October 21, 2008	Kitt Peak	Spacewatch	·	1.7 km	MPC · JPL
397907	2008 UO_{338}	—	October 21, 2008	Mount Lemmon	Mount Lemmon Survey	·	1.6 km	MPC · JPL
397908	2008 UC_{339}	—	October 22, 2008	Kitt Peak	Spacewatch	·	1.8 km	MPC · JPL
397909	2008 UR_{348}	—	October 25, 2008	Kitt Peak	Spacewatch	·	1.3 km	MPC · JPL
397910	2008 UR_{366}	—	October 22, 2008	Kitt Peak	Spacewatch	·	1.1 km	MPC · JPL
397911	2008 VW_{22}	—	November 1, 2008	Mount Lemmon	Mount Lemmon Survey	·	1.4 km	MPC · JPL
397912	2008 VS_{23}	—	October 25, 2008	Mount Lemmon	Mount Lemmon Survey	·	1.4 km	MPC · JPL
397913	2008 VD_{26}	—	October 8, 2008	Mount Lemmon	Mount Lemmon Survey	·	1.2 km	MPC · JPL
397914	2008 VP_{32}	—	November 2, 2008	Mount Lemmon	Mount Lemmon Survey	V	530 m	MPC · JPL
397915	2008 VJ_{47}	—	November 3, 2008	Kitt Peak	Spacewatch	MAS	690 m	MPC · JPL
397916	2008 VH_{53}	—	November 6, 2008	Kitt Peak	Spacewatch	·	1.2 km	MPC · JPL
397917	2008 VC_{71}	—	November 9, 2008	Kitt Peak	Spacewatch	NYS	1 km	MPC · JPL
397918	2008 VE_{72}	—	November 8, 2008	Mount Lemmon	Mount Lemmon Survey	MAS	800 m	MPC · JPL
397919	2008 VQ_{73}	—	November 6, 2008	Mount Lemmon	Mount Lemmon Survey	·	1.4 km	MPC · JPL
397920	2008 VN_{77}	—	November 3, 2008	Mount Lemmon	Mount Lemmon Survey	·	1.3 km	MPC · JPL
397921	2008 VU_{79}	—	November 2, 2008	Socorro	LINEAR	·	2.0 km	MPC · JPL
397922	2008 WL_{10}	—	November 18, 2008	La Sagra	OAM	·	1.3 km	MPC · JPL
397923	2008 WM_{14}	—	September 22, 2008	Kitt Peak	Spacewatch	·	570 m	MPC · JPL
397924	2008 WL_{15}	—	September 7, 2008	Mount Lemmon	Mount Lemmon Survey	AGN	1.2 km	MPC · JPL
397925	2008 WA_{20}	—	October 19, 2001	Kitt Peak	Spacewatch	V	520 m	MPC · JPL
397926	2008 WP_{30}	—	November 19, 2008	Mount Lemmon	Mount Lemmon Survey	·	1.0 km	MPC · JPL
397927	2008 WQ_{34}	—	April 26, 2003	Kitt Peak	Spacewatch	·	1.0 km	MPC · JPL
397928	2008 WP_{37}	—	November 17, 2008	Kitt Peak	Spacewatch	·	1.3 km	MPC · JPL
397929	2008 WA_{60}	—	November 18, 2008	Socorro	LINEAR	·	1.7 km	MPC · JPL
397930	2008 WF_{62}	—	October 22, 2008	Kitt Peak	Spacewatch	V	850 m	MPC · JPL
397931	2008 WG_{70}	—	November 18, 2008	Kitt Peak	Spacewatch	·	1.1 km	MPC · JPL
397932	2008 WJ_{73}	—	November 19, 2008	Mount Lemmon	Mount Lemmon Survey	·	1.4 km	MPC · JPL
397933	2008 WU_{77}	—	November 7, 2008	Mount Lemmon	Mount Lemmon Survey	·	1.8 km	MPC · JPL
397934	2008 WU_{106}	—	November 30, 2008	Kitt Peak	Spacewatch	·	1.2 km	MPC · JPL
397935	2008 WR_{113}	—	November 30, 2008	Kitt Peak	Spacewatch	·	1.1 km	MPC · JPL
397936	2008 XX_{6}	—	December 7, 2008	Marly	P. Kocher	·	1.4 km	MPC · JPL
397937	2008 XF_{37}	—	December 2, 2008	Kitt Peak	Spacewatch	·	1.2 km	MPC · JPL
397938	2008 XX_{39}	—	December 2, 2008	Kitt Peak	Spacewatch	(5)	810 m	MPC · JPL
397939	2008 XF_{41}	—	December 2, 2008	Kitt Peak	Spacewatch	V	750 m	MPC · JPL
397940	2008 XY_{41}	—	November 1, 2008	Mount Lemmon	Mount Lemmon Survey	·	1.8 km	MPC · JPL
397941	2008 XH_{48}	—	December 4, 2008	Mount Lemmon	Mount Lemmon Survey	·	1.1 km	MPC · JPL
397942	2008 XG_{51}	—	December 3, 2008	Socorro	LINEAR	·	3.0 km	MPC · JPL
397943	2008 XL_{51}	—	December 1, 2008	Kitt Peak	Spacewatch	·	1.5 km	MPC · JPL
397944	2008 XR_{55}	—	December 4, 2008	Catalina	CSS	·	1.8 km	MPC · JPL
397945	2008 YK_{15}	—	December 7, 2008	Mount Lemmon	Mount Lemmon Survey	·	1.6 km	MPC · JPL
397946	2008 YY_{17}	—	December 21, 2008	Mount Lemmon	Mount Lemmon Survey	·	1.5 km	MPC · JPL
397947	2008 YE_{18}	—	December 21, 2008	Mount Lemmon	Mount Lemmon Survey	·	1.6 km	MPC · JPL
397948	2008 YQ_{19}	—	December 21, 2008	Mount Lemmon	Mount Lemmon Survey	·	2.0 km	MPC · JPL
397949	2008 YP_{23}	—	December 19, 2004	Mount Lemmon	Mount Lemmon Survey	·	2.4 km	MPC · JPL
397950	2008 YA_{56}	—	December 30, 2008	Mount Lemmon	Mount Lemmon Survey	·	1.1 km	MPC · JPL
397951	2008 YD_{63}	—	December 30, 2008	Mount Lemmon	Mount Lemmon Survey	·	1.9 km	MPC · JPL
397952	2008 YQ_{66}	—	October 24, 2008	Mount Lemmon	Mount Lemmon Survey	·	1.4 km	MPC · JPL
397953	2008 YN_{74}	—	December 30, 2008	Kitt Peak	Spacewatch	·	740 m	MPC · JPL
397954	2008 YX_{76}	—	December 30, 2008	Mount Lemmon	Mount Lemmon Survey	·	1.9 km	MPC · JPL
397955	2008 YX_{88}	—	December 21, 2008	Kitt Peak	Spacewatch	·	1.4 km	MPC · JPL
397956	2008 YH_{93}	—	December 29, 2008	Kitt Peak	Spacewatch	MAR	910 m	MPC · JPL
397957	2008 YN_{93}	—	December 29, 2008	Kitt Peak	Spacewatch	·	1.5 km	MPC · JPL
397958	2008 YQ_{93}	—	December 21, 2008	Mount Lemmon	Mount Lemmon Survey	·	1.2 km	MPC · JPL
397959	2008 YT_{98}	—	October 31, 2008	Mount Lemmon	Mount Lemmon Survey	·	1.2 km	MPC · JPL
397960	2008 YV_{103}	—	December 29, 2008	Kitt Peak	Spacewatch	NYS	1.1 km	MPC · JPL
397961	2008 YR_{111}	—	November 30, 2008	Kitt Peak	Spacewatch	·	1.2 km	MPC · JPL
397962	2008 YR_{117}	—	December 4, 2008	Mount Lemmon	Mount Lemmon Survey	·	1.3 km	MPC · JPL
397963	2008 YY_{117}	—	December 29, 2008	Mount Lemmon	Mount Lemmon Survey	MAS	830 m	MPC · JPL
397964	2008 YT_{118}	—	December 29, 2008	Kitt Peak	Spacewatch	·	1.8 km	MPC · JPL
397965	2008 YK_{138}	—	December 30, 2008	Kitt Peak	Spacewatch	·	1.5 km	MPC · JPL
397966	2008 YT_{142}	—	December 30, 2008	Kitt Peak	Spacewatch	CLA	1.7 km	MPC · JPL
397967	2008 YE_{146}	—	December 22, 2008	Kitt Peak	Spacewatch	·	870 m	MPC · JPL
397968	2008 YQ_{168}	—	December 1, 2008	Kitt Peak	Spacewatch	·	1.0 km	MPC · JPL
397969	2008 YX_{170}	—	December 31, 2008	Kitt Peak	Spacewatch	·	2.5 km	MPC · JPL
397970	2009 AV_{11}	—	January 2, 2009	Mount Lemmon	Mount Lemmon Survey	·	1.8 km	MPC · JPL
397971	2009 AW_{17}	—	January 2, 2009	Kitt Peak	Spacewatch	·	1.5 km	MPC · JPL
397972	2009 AY_{33}	—	January 15, 2009	Kitt Peak	Spacewatch	NYS	1.2 km	MPC · JPL
397973	2009 AO_{43}	—	January 1, 2009	Kitt Peak	Spacewatch	·	1.0 km	MPC · JPL
397974	2009 AO_{44}	—	January 8, 2009	Kitt Peak	Spacewatch	·	1.3 km	MPC · JPL
397975	2009 AF_{45}	—	January 15, 2009	Kitt Peak	Spacewatch	·	960 m	MPC · JPL
397976	2009 AN_{48}	—	January 2, 2009	Mount Lemmon	Mount Lemmon Survey	·	1.5 km	MPC · JPL
397977	2009 AB_{49}	—	January 15, 2009	Socorro	LINEAR	·	1.9 km	MPC · JPL
397978	2009 AV_{49}	—	January 7, 2009	Kitt Peak	Spacewatch	·	1.5 km	MPC · JPL
397979	2009 BQ_{16}	—	January 16, 2009	Kitt Peak	Spacewatch	·	1.5 km	MPC · JPL
397980	2009 BH_{53}	—	November 23, 2008	Mount Lemmon	Mount Lemmon Survey	(5)	1.1 km	MPC · JPL
397981	2009 BC_{67}	—	October 7, 2007	Mount Lemmon	Mount Lemmon Survey	·	1.2 km	MPC · JPL
397982	2009 BA_{77}	—	January 28, 2009	Catalina	CSS	(5)	1.4 km	MPC · JPL
397983	2009 BS_{78}	—	December 21, 2008	Kitt Peak	Spacewatch	·	1.5 km	MPC · JPL
397984	2009 BS_{86}	—	January 15, 2009	Kitt Peak	Spacewatch	·	1.1 km	MPC · JPL
397985	2009 BC_{88}	—	December 30, 2008	Mount Lemmon	Mount Lemmon Survey	·	1.4 km	MPC · JPL
397986	2009 BA_{89}	—	November 8, 2008	Mount Lemmon	Mount Lemmon Survey	(5)	1.3 km	MPC · JPL
397987	2009 BC_{93}	—	January 25, 2009	Kitt Peak	Spacewatch	·	1.3 km	MPC · JPL
397988	2009 BK_{99}	—	October 30, 2008	Mount Lemmon	Mount Lemmon Survey	·	1.8 km	MPC · JPL
397989	2009 BT_{99}	—	January 20, 2009	Catalina	CSS	·	1.4 km	MPC · JPL
397990	2009 BU_{99}	—	October 2, 2008	Mount Lemmon	Mount Lemmon Survey	·	1.8 km	MPC · JPL
397991	2009 BH_{110}	—	January 31, 2009	Mount Lemmon	Mount Lemmon Survey	·	3.3 km	MPC · JPL
397992	2009 BS_{114}	—	January 26, 2009	Kitt Peak	Spacewatch	·	1.5 km	MPC · JPL
397993	2009 BS_{128}	—	December 22, 2008	Mount Lemmon	Mount Lemmon Survey	·	2.3 km	MPC · JPL
397994	2009 BO_{133}	—	January 29, 2009	Kitt Peak	Spacewatch	·	1.1 km	MPC · JPL
397995	2009 BY_{137}	—	November 24, 2008	Mount Lemmon	Mount Lemmon Survey	·	1.4 km	MPC · JPL
397996	2009 BV_{147}	—	January 30, 2009	Mount Lemmon	Mount Lemmon Survey	EUN	1.1 km	MPC · JPL
397997	2009 BT_{166}	—	January 31, 2009	Mount Lemmon	Mount Lemmon Survey	·	3.0 km	MPC · JPL
397998	2009 BY_{166}	—	January 16, 2009	Kitt Peak	Spacewatch	·	1.4 km	MPC · JPL
397999	2009 BX_{175}	—	June 3, 2005	Kitt Peak	Spacewatch	·	2.4 km	MPC · JPL
398000	2009 BN_{176}	—	January 31, 2009	Kitt Peak	Spacewatch	·	3.1 km	MPC · JPL

back to top

== See also ==
- Meanings of minor-planet names: 397001–398000
