= List of minor planets: 399001–400000 =

The following is a partial list of minor planets, running from minor-planet number 399001 through 400000, inclusive. The primary data for this and other partial lists is based on JPL's "Small-Body Orbital Elements" and data available from the Minor Planet Center. Critical list information is also provided by the MPC, unless otherwise specified from Lowell Observatory. A detailed description of the table's columns and additional sources are given on the main page including a complete list of every page in this series, and a statistical break-up on the dynamical classification of minor planets.

Also see the summary list of all named bodies in numerical and alphabetical order, and the corresponding naming citations for the number range of this particular list. New namings may only be added to this list after official publication, as the preannouncement of names is condemned by the Working Group for Small Bodies Nomenclature of the International Astronomical Union.

Near-Earth obj.	MBA (inner)	MBA (outer)	Centaur
Mars-crosser	MBA (middle)	Jupiter trojan	Trans-Neptunian obj.
Unclassified

== 399001–399100 ==
Designation			Discovery			Properties		Ref
Permanent	Provisional	Named after	Date	Site	Discoverer(s)	Category	Diam.	Ref
399001	2013 FE_{19}	—	September 25, 2006	Mount Lemmon	Mount Lemmon Survey	·	1.8 km	MPC · JPL
399002	2013 FC_{23}	—	March 17, 2004	Kitt Peak	Spacewatch	·	2.3 km	MPC · JPL
399003	2013 FM_{26}	—	February 7, 2002	Socorro	LINEAR	V	860 m	MPC · JPL
399004	2013 GW_{3}	—	September 11, 2004	Kitt Peak	Spacewatch	·	3.2 km	MPC · JPL
399005	2013 GZ_{8}	—	July 22, 2010	WISE	WISE	·	2.9 km	MPC · JPL
399006	2013 GX_{9}	—	March 16, 2002	Socorro	LINEAR	·	3.8 km	MPC · JPL
399007	2013 GV_{10}	—	March 11, 2007	Kitt Peak	Spacewatch	·	4.7 km	MPC · JPL
399008	2013 GH_{11}	—	July 24, 2010	WISE	WISE	·	5.1 km	MPC · JPL
399009	2013 GT_{12}	—	January 27, 2003	Kitt Peak	Spacewatch	·	2.6 km	MPC · JPL
399010	2013 GJ_{16}	—	April 29, 2003	Kitt Peak	Spacewatch	TEL	1.7 km	MPC · JPL
399011	2013 GF_{19}	—	September 6, 2004	Palomar	NEAT	·	3.5 km	MPC · JPL
399012	2013 GM_{22}	—	March 5, 2008	Mount Lemmon	Mount Lemmon Survey	·	2.1 km	MPC · JPL
399013	2013 GE_{27}	—	November 10, 1999	Kitt Peak	Spacewatch	·	3.6 km	MPC · JPL
399014	2013 GU_{27}	—	February 3, 2008	Mount Lemmon	Mount Lemmon Survey	·	2.2 km	MPC · JPL
399015	2013 GA_{33}	—	April 10, 2005	Mount Lemmon	Mount Lemmon Survey	·	1.4 km	MPC · JPL
399016	2013 GM_{35}	—	December 2, 2010	Mount Lemmon	Mount Lemmon Survey	LUT	6.2 km	MPC · JPL
399017	2013 GH_{38}	—	October 30, 2005	Kitt Peak	Spacewatch	·	2.0 km	MPC · JPL
399018	2013 GO_{48}	—	March 26, 2004	Kitt Peak	Spacewatch	·	2.3 km	MPC · JPL
399019	2013 GT_{55}	—	March 9, 2005	Catalina	CSS	·	1.6 km	MPC · JPL
399020	2013 GZ_{55}	—	September 23, 2009	Mount Lemmon	Mount Lemmon Survey	·	3.2 km	MPC · JPL
399021	2013 GH_{59}	—	November 5, 1999	Kitt Peak	Spacewatch	SUL	2.6 km	MPC · JPL
399022	2013 GT_{71}	—	March 9, 2007	Mount Lemmon	Mount Lemmon Survey	THM	2.2 km	MPC · JPL
399023	2013 GB_{83}	—	August 31, 2005	Kitt Peak	Spacewatch	HOF	2.9 km	MPC · JPL
399024	2013 GG_{85}	—	July 10, 2004	Catalina	CSS	·	2.6 km	MPC · JPL
399025	2013 GV_{91}	—	March 13, 2007	Catalina	CSS	·	3.5 km	MPC · JPL
399026	2013 GD_{92}	—	March 14, 2007	Catalina	CSS	·	4.0 km	MPC · JPL
399027	2013 GG_{119}	—	October 7, 2004	Kitt Peak	Spacewatch	·	2.9 km	MPC · JPL
399028	2013 GX_{125}	—	September 11, 2004	Kitt Peak	Spacewatch	·	2.3 km	MPC · JPL
399029	2013 GT_{134}	—	September 29, 2009	Mount Lemmon	Mount Lemmon Survey	·	3.4 km	MPC · JPL
399030	2013 HK_{4}	—	December 18, 2003	Kitt Peak	Spacewatch	·	1.9 km	MPC · JPL
399031	2013 HM_{13}	—	June 1, 2005	Anderson Mesa	LONEOS	(194)	2.2 km	MPC · JPL
399032	2013 HK_{18}	—	March 10, 2007	Mount Lemmon	Mount Lemmon Survey	THM	2.4 km	MPC · JPL
399033	2013 HT_{22}	—	October 1, 2010	Mount Lemmon	Mount Lemmon Survey	·	1.7 km	MPC · JPL
399034	2013 HM_{23}	—	July 21, 2010	WISE	WISE	·	4.5 km	MPC · JPL
399035	2013 HZ_{23}	—	October 30, 2010	Kitt Peak	Spacewatch	·	4.0 km	MPC · JPL
399036	2013 HM_{34}	—	January 26, 2000	Kitt Peak	Spacewatch	·	1.4 km	MPC · JPL
399037	2013 HJ_{50}	—	October 13, 1999	Kitt Peak	Spacewatch	·	2.7 km	MPC · JPL
399038	2013 HT_{53}	—	September 21, 2009	Catalina	CSS	·	3.4 km	MPC · JPL
399039	2013 HB_{65}	—	October 13, 2004	Kitt Peak	Spacewatch	·	3.1 km	MPC · JPL
399040	2013 HN_{126}	—	November 10, 2010	Mount Lemmon	Mount Lemmon Survey	EOS	1.8 km	MPC · JPL
399041	2013 JA_{4}	—	April 9, 2002	Kitt Peak	Spacewatch	·	3.4 km	MPC · JPL
399042	2013 JL_{5}	—	December 29, 2011	Mount Lemmon	Mount Lemmon Survey	·	3.6 km	MPC · JPL
399043	2013 JZ_{17}	—	September 19, 2006	Catalina	CSS	H	460 m	MPC · JPL
399044	2013 JF_{33}	—	May 15, 2002	Anderson Mesa	LONEOS	·	6.3 km	MPC · JPL
399045	2013 JJ_{45}	—	May 19, 2004	Kitt Peak	Spacewatch	·	2.7 km	MPC · JPL
399046	2013 JU_{61}	—	November 3, 2004	Kitt Peak	Spacewatch	EOS	2.3 km	MPC · JPL
399047	2013 KZ_{3}	—	October 1, 2003	Kitt Peak	Spacewatch	·	3.4 km	MPC · JPL
399048	2013 KB_{4}	—	September 30, 2006	Mount Lemmon	Mount Lemmon Survey	·	2.1 km	MPC · JPL
399049	2013 KS_{17}	—	July 29, 2008	Mount Lemmon	Mount Lemmon Survey	·	3.4 km	MPC · JPL
399050	2013 LF	—	September 30, 2010	Mount Lemmon	Mount Lemmon Survey	·	1.3 km	MPC · JPL
399051	2013 LA_{28}	—	July 5, 2005	Kitt Peak	Spacewatch	·	1.5 km	MPC · JPL
399052	2013 LV_{34}	—	January 8, 2006	Mount Lemmon	Mount Lemmon Survey	·	4.5 km	MPC · JPL
399053	2013 PD_{54}	—	September 30, 2003	Kitt Peak	Spacewatch	·	1.7 km	MPC · JPL
399054	2013 QP_{59}	—	November 20, 2000	Socorro	LINEAR	·	2.4 km	MPC · JPL
399055	2013 TL_{45}	—	November 26, 2005	Mount Lemmon	Mount Lemmon Survey	·	1.4 km	MPC · JPL
399056	2013 WN_{69}	—	October 4, 2004	Kitt Peak	Spacewatch	·	1.6 km	MPC · JPL
399057	2013 YX_{15}	—	May 10, 2007	Mount Lemmon	Mount Lemmon Survey	·	2.7 km	MPC · JPL
399058	2013 YH_{19}	—	October 28, 2008	Kitt Peak	Spacewatch	·	2.0 km	MPC · JPL
399059	2013 YF_{28}	—	April 14, 2007	Mount Lemmon	Mount Lemmon Survey	MAS	720 m	MPC · JPL
399060	2013 YV_{29}	—	May 31, 2006	Mount Lemmon	Mount Lemmon Survey	·	1.5 km	MPC · JPL
399061	2013 YF_{31}	—	November 16, 2000	Kitt Peak	Spacewatch	·	1.9 km	MPC · JPL
399062	2013 YW_{80}	—	February 21, 2006	Catalina	CSS	·	1.7 km	MPC · JPL
399063	2013 YA_{85}	—	April 2, 2006	Catalina	CSS	·	1.3 km	MPC · JPL
399064	2013 YQ_{139}	—	February 2, 2005	Catalina	CSS	·	2.3 km	MPC · JPL
399065	2014 BQ_{2}	—	July 5, 2003	Kitt Peak	Spacewatch	·	2.1 km	MPC · JPL
399066	2014 BK_{23}	—	February 3, 2001	Kitt Peak	Spacewatch	·	3.7 km	MPC · JPL
399067	2014 BG_{37}	—	March 14, 2004	Kitt Peak	Spacewatch	·	680 m	MPC · JPL
399068	2014 BQ_{46}	—	December 26, 2006	Kitt Peak	Spacewatch	·	1.4 km	MPC · JPL
399069	2014 BL_{59}	—	December 12, 1999	Kitt Peak	Spacewatch	·	1.6 km	MPC · JPL
399070	2014 CW_{11}	—	January 13, 2000	Kitt Peak	Spacewatch	·	2.1 km	MPC · JPL
399071	2014 CX_{19}	—	February 13, 2010	Mount Lemmon	Mount Lemmon Survey	·	2.2 km	MPC · JPL
399072	2014 CZ_{20}	—	September 27, 2003	Kitt Peak	Spacewatch	·	2.5 km	MPC · JPL
399073	2014 CX_{21}	—	March 27, 2003	Kitt Peak	Spacewatch	·	1.4 km	MPC · JPL
399074	2014 CX_{22}	—	April 2, 2006	Mount Lemmon	Mount Lemmon Survey	·	2.1 km	MPC · JPL
399075	2014 CJ_{23}	—	October 10, 2012	Mount Lemmon	Mount Lemmon Survey	·	3.5 km	MPC · JPL
399076	2014 DC_{5}	—	September 12, 2007	Kitt Peak	Spacewatch	·	1.9 km	MPC · JPL
399077	2014 DB_{9}	—	April 28, 2003	Kitt Peak	Spacewatch	·	1.4 km	MPC · JPL
399078	2014 DS_{12}	—	November 20, 2006	Kitt Peak	Spacewatch	·	4.2 km	MPC · JPL
399079	2014 DV_{12}	—	January 19, 2008	Mount Lemmon	Mount Lemmon Survey	·	4.4 km	MPC · JPL
399080	2014 DO_{13}	—	April 17, 2009	Catalina	CSS	·	2.8 km	MPC · JPL
399081	2014 DQ_{13}	—	April 28, 1997	Kitt Peak	Spacewatch	·	1.0 km	MPC · JPL
399082	2014 DZ_{13}	—	April 1, 2009	XuYi	PMO NEO Survey Program	·	4.5 km	MPC · JPL
399083	2014 DM_{14}	—	December 12, 2004	Kitt Peak	Spacewatch	·	1.9 km	MPC · JPL
399084	2014 DS_{14}	—	November 18, 2008	Kitt Peak	Spacewatch	·	2.6 km	MPC · JPL
399085	2014 DU_{14}	—	January 16, 2008	Kitt Peak	Spacewatch	·	4.0 km	MPC · JPL
399086	2014 DZ_{14}	—	October 2, 2003	Kitt Peak	Spacewatch	MAR	1.5 km	MPC · JPL
399087	2014 DE_{20}	—	September 20, 1995	Kitt Peak	Spacewatch	·	1.2 km	MPC · JPL
399088	2014 DC_{21}	—	October 15, 2004	Mount Lemmon	Mount Lemmon Survey	MAS	870 m	MPC · JPL
399089	2014 DT_{28}	—	April 11, 2005	Kitt Peak	Spacewatch	·	3.0 km	MPC · JPL
399090	2014 DU_{31}	—	February 8, 2002	Socorro	LINEAR	·	1.8 km	MPC · JPL
399091	2014 DG_{32}	—	October 17, 2009	Mount Lemmon	Mount Lemmon Survey	L4	9.1 km	MPC · JPL
399092	2014 DA_{33}	—	October 22, 2006	Kitt Peak	Spacewatch	·	3.2 km	MPC · JPL
399093	2014 DL_{34}	—	May 6, 2010	Catalina	CSS	·	1.9 km	MPC · JPL
399094	2014 DD_{35}	—	May 28, 1997	Kitt Peak	Spacewatch	·	2.4 km	MPC · JPL
399095	2014 DR_{37}	—	January 20, 2009	Mount Lemmon	Mount Lemmon Survey	GEF	1.3 km	MPC · JPL
399096	2014 DZ_{37}	—	February 1, 2009	Mount Lemmon	Mount Lemmon Survey	·	2.9 km	MPC · JPL
399097	2014 DS_{38}	—	May 23, 2006	Anderson Mesa	LONEOS	EUN	1.4 km	MPC · JPL
399098	2014 DY_{41}	—	October 1, 2008	Catalina	CSS	·	1.4 km	MPC · JPL
399099	2014 DR_{46}	—	October 9, 2005	Kitt Peak	Spacewatch	·	770 m	MPC · JPL
399100	2014 DF_{47}	—	September 26, 2006	Kitt Peak	Spacewatch	EMA	2.8 km	MPC · JPL

== 399101–399200 ==
back to top

Designation			Discovery			Properties		Ref
Permanent	Provisional	Named after	Date	Site	Discoverer(s)	Category	Diam.	Ref
399101	2014 DJ_{48}	—	April 1, 2011	Kitt Peak	Spacewatch	·	890 m	MPC · JPL
399102	2014 DG_{53}	—	October 12, 2005	Kitt Peak	Spacewatch	·	650 m	MPC · JPL
399103	2014 DC_{56}	—	September 26, 2006	Kitt Peak	Spacewatch	·	2.4 km	MPC · JPL
399104	2014 DE_{58}	—	March 26, 2003	Kitt Peak	Spacewatch	·	4.2 km	MPC · JPL
399105	2014 DM_{61}	—	March 12, 2010	Mount Lemmon	Mount Lemmon Survey	·	1.4 km	MPC · JPL
399106	2014 DU_{62}	—	December 24, 2005	Kitt Peak	Spacewatch	MAS	670 m	MPC · JPL
399107	2014 DU_{72}	—	October 27, 2008	Mount Lemmon	Mount Lemmon Survey	·	1.7 km	MPC · JPL
399108	2014 DH_{75}	—	March 15, 2007	Mount Lemmon	Mount Lemmon Survey	·	1.4 km	MPC · JPL
399109	2014 DY_{75}	—	March 10, 2003	Kitt Peak	Spacewatch	·	3.5 km	MPC · JPL
399110	2014 DF_{76}	—	March 23, 1996	Kitt Peak	Spacewatch	·	1.7 km	MPC · JPL
399111	2014 DR_{79}	—	April 14, 2005	Kitt Peak	Spacewatch	·	2.0 km	MPC · JPL
399112	2014 DP_{85}	—	April 5, 2003	Kitt Peak	Spacewatch	NYS	1.2 km	MPC · JPL
399113	2014 DT_{85}	—	March 11, 2005	Kitt Peak	Spacewatch	·	2.3 km	MPC · JPL
399114	2014 DD_{97}	—	March 13, 2011	Mount Lemmon	Mount Lemmon Survey	·	620 m	MPC · JPL
399115	2014 DU_{97}	—	February 12, 2008	Mount Lemmon	Mount Lemmon Survey	·	3.7 km	MPC · JPL
399116	2014 DT_{103}	—	July 19, 2004	Anderson Mesa	LONEOS	NYS	1.3 km	MPC · JPL
399117	2014 DU_{113}	—	March 29, 2008	Catalina	CSS	CYB	6.2 km	MPC · JPL
399118	2014 DV_{115}	—	April 13, 1996	Kitt Peak	Spacewatch	·	960 m	MPC · JPL
399119	2014 DE_{122}	—	March 9, 2005	Kitt Peak	Spacewatch	·	1.7 km	MPC · JPL
399120	2014 DL_{122}	—	September 24, 2008	Mount Lemmon	Mount Lemmon Survey	L4	8.9 km	MPC · JPL
399121	2014 DG_{124}	—	March 27, 2003	Kitt Peak	Spacewatch	NYS	1.4 km	MPC · JPL
399122	2014 DY_{131}	—	August 28, 2006	Kitt Peak	Spacewatch	KOR	1.7 km	MPC · JPL
399123	2014 DU_{132}	—	March 15, 2004	Kitt Peak	Spacewatch	·	2.2 km	MPC · JPL
399124	2014 DL_{133}	—	January 27, 2007	Kitt Peak	Spacewatch	·	900 m	MPC · JPL
399125	2014 DH_{134}	—	October 12, 2005	Kitt Peak	Spacewatch	MAS	680 m	MPC · JPL
399126	2014 DY_{139}	—	February 13, 2010	Mount Lemmon	Mount Lemmon Survey	·	1.3 km	MPC · JPL
399127	2014 DS_{140}	—	November 24, 2003	Kitt Peak	Spacewatch	·	1.7 km	MPC · JPL
399128	2014 DL_{141}	—	May 15, 2004	Socorro	LINEAR	·	720 m	MPC · JPL
399129	2014 EB	—	March 11, 2010	WISE	WISE	·	2.9 km	MPC · JPL
399130	2014 EW_{1}	—	December 9, 2004	Kitt Peak	Spacewatch	·	1.5 km	MPC · JPL
399131	2014 EB_{5}	—	October 30, 2005	Kitt Peak	Spacewatch	·	1.3 km	MPC · JPL
399132	2014 EK_{7}	—	September 12, 2007	Mount Lemmon	Mount Lemmon Survey	WIT	1.1 km	MPC · JPL
399133	2014 ES_{10}	—	September 22, 1995	Kitt Peak	Spacewatch	TIR	2.1 km	MPC · JPL
399134	2014 ES_{15}	—	November 8, 2007	Mount Lemmon	Mount Lemmon Survey	·	2.0 km	MPC · JPL
399135	2014 EK_{17}	—	March 18, 2004	Kitt Peak	Spacewatch	·	720 m	MPC · JPL
399136	2014 EX_{17}	—	November 1, 2008	Mount Lemmon	Mount Lemmon Survey	·	1.4 km	MPC · JPL
399137	2014 EG_{18}	—	September 10, 2007	Kitt Peak	Spacewatch	·	2.1 km	MPC · JPL
399138	2014 EH_{18}	—	January 17, 2005	Kitt Peak	Spacewatch	·	2.2 km	MPC · JPL
399139	2014 EK_{20}	—	December 5, 2005	Mount Lemmon	Mount Lemmon Survey	MAS	700 m	MPC · JPL
399140	2014 ES_{20}	—	August 16, 2009	Kitt Peak	Spacewatch	L4	9.6 km	MPC · JPL
399141	2014 ES_{21}	—	January 15, 2008	Mount Lemmon	Mount Lemmon Survey	EOS	2.0 km	MPC · JPL
399142	2014 EF_{31}	—	February 1, 2008	Mount Lemmon	Mount Lemmon Survey	·	3.8 km	MPC · JPL
399143	2014 ED_{34}	—	April 6, 1994	Kitt Peak	Spacewatch	MAR	1.3 km	MPC · JPL
399144	2014 EP_{37}	—	January 27, 2003	Socorro	LINEAR	·	2.9 km	MPC · JPL
399145	2014 ET_{38}	—	April 22, 2007	Mount Lemmon	Mount Lemmon Survey	·	1.6 km	MPC · JPL
399146	2014 EQ_{39}	—	June 16, 2005	Mount Lemmon	Mount Lemmon Survey	·	2.3 km	MPC · JPL
399147	2014 ET_{39}	—	December 10, 2009	Mount Lemmon	Mount Lemmon Survey	·	760 m	MPC · JPL
399148	2014 EP_{45}	—	October 4, 2006	Mount Lemmon	Mount Lemmon Survey	·	3.4 km	MPC · JPL
399149	2014 ES_{45}	—	February 26, 2010	WISE	WISE	·	2.8 km	MPC · JPL
399150	2014 EE_{50}	—	May 11, 2003	Kitt Peak	Spacewatch	·	1.1 km	MPC · JPL
399151	2014 EQ_{50}	—	January 7, 2002	Kitt Peak	Spacewatch	·	4.4 km	MPC · JPL
399152	2014 ET_{51}	—	December 31, 2002	Socorro	LINEAR	·	1.4 km	MPC · JPL
399153	2014 FL_{4}	—	October 27, 2009	Mount Lemmon	Mount Lemmon Survey	L4	10 km	MPC · JPL
399154	2014 FB_{6}	—	April 5, 2005	Catalina	CSS	·	2.8 km	MPC · JPL
399155	2014 FC_{6}	—	May 12, 2007	Kitt Peak	Spacewatch	·	840 m	MPC · JPL
399156	2014 FB_{11}	—	October 27, 2012	Mount Lemmon	Mount Lemmon Survey	·	2.0 km	MPC · JPL
399157	2014 FE_{11}	—	August 18, 2006	Kitt Peak	Spacewatch	·	2.4 km	MPC · JPL
399158	2014 FG_{17}	—	September 13, 2005	Kitt Peak	Spacewatch	·	2.0 km	MPC · JPL
399159	2014 FH_{17}	—	September 24, 2000	Socorro	LINEAR	T_{j} (2.99) · EUP	3.3 km	MPC · JPL
399160	2014 FG_{18}	—	January 13, 2005	Kitt Peak	Spacewatch	LEO	1.9 km	MPC · JPL
399161	2014 FQ_{25}	—	December 19, 2009	Mount Lemmon	Mount Lemmon Survey	·	1.8 km	MPC · JPL
399162	2014 FM_{29}	—	July 16, 2004	Siding Spring	SSS	·	4.2 km	MPC · JPL
399163	2014 FF_{34}	—	October 30, 2005	Kitt Peak	Spacewatch	·	990 m	MPC · JPL
399164	2014 FR_{35}	—	March 21, 2010	Catalina	CSS	·	1.5 km	MPC · JPL
399165	2014 FS_{35}	—	January 11, 2010	Kitt Peak	Spacewatch	·	1.5 km	MPC · JPL
399166	2014 FT_{35}	—	March 14, 2010	Kitt Peak	Spacewatch	·	1.3 km	MPC · JPL
399167	2014 FG_{36}	—	February 27, 2008	Mount Lemmon	Mount Lemmon Survey	EOS	1.9 km	MPC · JPL
399168	2014 FL_{36}	—	October 6, 2008	Kitt Peak	Spacewatch	·	1.2 km	MPC · JPL
399169	2014 FA_{37}	—	March 19, 2004	Socorro	LINEAR	·	720 m	MPC · JPL
399170	2014 FJ_{37}	—	December 25, 2005	Kitt Peak	Spacewatch	MAS	710 m	MPC · JPL
399171	2014 FN_{37}	—	October 15, 2001	Kitt Peak	Spacewatch	·	1.1 km	MPC · JPL
399172	2014 FK_{39}	—	November 18, 2006	Kitt Peak	Spacewatch	·	4.3 km	MPC · JPL
399173	2014 FR_{41}	—	January 20, 2009	Kitt Peak	Spacewatch	·	2.0 km	MPC · JPL
399174	2014 FW_{47}	—	November 21, 2006	Mount Lemmon	Mount Lemmon Survey	LIX	6.4 km	MPC · JPL
399175	2014 FX_{47}	—	October 8, 2008	Mount Lemmon	Mount Lemmon Survey	·	2.0 km	MPC · JPL
399176	2014 FR_{48}	—	December 21, 2006	Mount Lemmon	Mount Lemmon Survey	·	990 m	MPC · JPL
399177	2014 FS_{48}	—	March 8, 2003	Socorro	LINEAR	·	1.2 km	MPC · JPL
399178	2014 FZ_{48}	—	April 22, 2009	Kitt Peak	Spacewatch	·	3.7 km	MPC · JPL
399179	2014 FE_{49}	—	October 12, 2007	Kitt Peak	Spacewatch	·	1.9 km	MPC · JPL
399180	2014 FY_{49}	—	October 18, 2006	Kitt Peak	Spacewatch	·	3.1 km	MPC · JPL
399181	2014 FE_{50}	—	November 26, 2009	Kitt Peak	Spacewatch	·	700 m	MPC · JPL
399182	2014 FP_{52}	—	April 11, 2005	Kitt Peak	Spacewatch	·	2.5 km	MPC · JPL
399183	2014 FC_{55}	—	March 6, 2008	Mount Lemmon	Mount Lemmon Survey	·	2.6 km	MPC · JPL
399184	2014 FG_{55}	—	January 28, 2007	Kitt Peak	Spacewatch	·	770 m	MPC · JPL
399185	2014 FK_{57}	—	April 27, 2009	Catalina	CSS	·	4.7 km	MPC · JPL
399186	2014 GS_{2}	—	February 7, 1999	Kitt Peak	Spacewatch	·	1.2 km	MPC · JPL
399187	2014 GP_{5}	—	January 30, 2006	Kitt Peak	Spacewatch	·	1.4 km	MPC · JPL
399188	2014 GR_{5}	—	February 7, 2008	Kitt Peak	Spacewatch	·	2.4 km	MPC · JPL
399189	2014 GS_{5}	—	April 7, 2005	Kitt Peak	Spacewatch	·	1.8 km	MPC · JPL
399190	2014 GU_{6}	—	March 14, 2007	Mount Lemmon	Mount Lemmon Survey	MAS	690 m	MPC · JPL
399191	2014 GE_{7}	—	October 11, 2005	Kitt Peak	Spacewatch	·	700 m	MPC · JPL
399192	2014 GG_{8}	—	December 2, 2008	Kitt Peak	Spacewatch	·	2.2 km	MPC · JPL
399193	2014 GS_{8}	—	October 8, 2008	Kitt Peak	Spacewatch	·	1.4 km	MPC · JPL
399194	2014 GZ_{8}	—	September 8, 1996	Kitt Peak	Spacewatch	NYS	1.2 km	MPC · JPL
399195	2014 GW_{10}	—	April 24, 2004	Kitt Peak	Spacewatch	·	1.8 km	MPC · JPL
399196	2014 GD_{15}	—	November 9, 2007	Kitt Peak	Spacewatch	·	1.6 km	MPC · JPL
399197	2014 GP_{16}	—	September 14, 2006	Kitt Peak	Spacewatch	·	3.7 km	MPC · JPL
399198	2014 GC_{17}	—	April 4, 2003	Kitt Peak	Spacewatch	·	2.5 km	MPC · JPL
399199	2014 GL_{22}	—	June 24, 2007	Kitt Peak	Spacewatch	·	1.4 km	MPC · JPL
399200	2014 GQ_{22}	—	April 26, 2003	Kitt Peak	Spacewatch	·	1.4 km	MPC · JPL

== 399201–399300 ==
back to top

Designation			Discovery			Properties		Ref
Permanent	Provisional	Named after	Date	Site	Discoverer(s)	Category	Diam.	Ref
399201	2014 GL_{25}	—	November 12, 2007	Catalina	CSS	·	1.7 km	MPC · JPL
399202	2014 GG_{26}	—	September 9, 2004	Kitt Peak	Spacewatch	·	1.3 km	MPC · JPL
399203	2014 GN_{26}	—	April 11, 2005	Kitt Peak	Spacewatch	·	1.6 km	MPC · JPL
399204	2014 GO_{27}	—	October 25, 2005	Mount Lemmon	Mount Lemmon Survey	THM	2.5 km	MPC · JPL
399205	2014 GS_{27}	—	March 9, 2005	Kitt Peak	Spacewatch	EUN	2.7 km	MPC · JPL
399206	2014 GX_{27}	—	February 13, 2010	Mount Lemmon	Mount Lemmon Survey	·	990 m	MPC · JPL
399207	2014 GZ_{27}	—	April 30, 2006	Kitt Peak	Spacewatch	·	1.1 km	MPC · JPL
399208	2014 GL_{28}	—	May 26, 2003	Kitt Peak	Spacewatch	TIR	2.6 km	MPC · JPL
399209	2014 GT_{28}	—	December 2, 2008	Kitt Peak	Spacewatch	CLA	1.9 km	MPC · JPL
399210	2014 GE_{29}	—	October 24, 2005	Kitt Peak	Spacewatch	·	3.5 km	MPC · JPL
399211	2014 GF_{29}	—	March 3, 2008	Mount Lemmon	Mount Lemmon Survey	EOS	1.8 km	MPC · JPL
399212	2014 GE_{30}	—	October 30, 2005	Kitt Peak	Spacewatch	·	760 m	MPC · JPL
399213	2014 GH_{31}	—	May 4, 2000	Kitt Peak	Spacewatch	·	3.2 km	MPC · JPL
399214	2014 GS_{33}	—	September 21, 1995	Kitt Peak	Spacewatch	·	690 m	MPC · JPL
399215	2014 GT_{33}	—	October 28, 2005	Catalina	CSS	·	3.6 km	MPC · JPL
399216	2014 GT_{36}	—	April 5, 2003	Kitt Peak	Spacewatch	·	4.0 km	MPC · JPL
399217	2014 GZ_{38}	—	January 12, 1996	Kitt Peak	Spacewatch	HYG	3.3 km	MPC · JPL
399218	2014 GF_{41}	—	July 25, 2004	Anderson Mesa	LONEOS	·	880 m	MPC · JPL
399219	2014 GK_{41}	—	August 31, 2005	Kitt Peak	Spacewatch	·	2.5 km	MPC · JPL
399220	2014 GA_{42}	—	November 5, 1999	Kitt Peak	Spacewatch	·	1.5 km	MPC · JPL
399221	2014 GF_{42}	—	March 5, 2008	Mount Lemmon	Mount Lemmon Survey	·	3.6 km	MPC · JPL
399222	2014 GJ_{42}	—	March 15, 2007	Mount Lemmon	Mount Lemmon Survey	·	1.1 km	MPC · JPL
399223	2014 GK_{42}	—	September 26, 1995	Kitt Peak	Spacewatch	·	740 m	MPC · JPL
399224	2014 GP_{42}	—	April 13, 2004	Kitt Peak	Spacewatch	·	710 m	MPC · JPL
399225	2014 GQ_{42}	—	February 24, 2006	Mount Lemmon	Mount Lemmon Survey	·	1.2 km	MPC · JPL
399226	2014 GE_{43}	—	September 18, 2006	Kitt Peak	Spacewatch	KOR	1.6 km	MPC · JPL
399227	2014 GN_{45}	—	April 21, 2003	Catalina	CSS	·	4.5 km	MPC · JPL
399228	2014 GH_{46}	—	October 29, 2000	Kitt Peak	Spacewatch	·	2.6 km	MPC · JPL
399229	2014 GT_{47}	—	December 21, 2005	Kitt Peak	Spacewatch	(2076)	970 m	MPC · JPL
399230	2014 GV_{47}	—	November 18, 1998	Kitt Peak	Spacewatch	·	1.9 km	MPC · JPL
399231	2014 HA	—	October 12, 2005	Kitt Peak	Spacewatch	·	5.7 km	MPC · JPL
399232	2014 HQ	—	October 1, 2005	Mount Lemmon	Mount Lemmon Survey	·	1.7 km	MPC · JPL
399233	2014 HT	—	May 29, 2003	Kitt Peak	Spacewatch	·	3.2 km	MPC · JPL
399234	2014 HV	—	April 4, 2003	Kitt Peak	Spacewatch	·	1.6 km	MPC · JPL
399235	2014 HY_{1}	—	February 11, 2008	Kitt Peak	Spacewatch	·	2.3 km	MPC · JPL
399236	2014 HW_{3}	—	September 4, 2007	Catalina	CSS	·	1.1 km	MPC · JPL
399237	2014 HU_{8}	—	October 8, 2008	Mount Lemmon	Mount Lemmon Survey	·	2.2 km	MPC · JPL
399238	2014 HA_{9}	—	April 5, 2003	Kitt Peak	Spacewatch	V	680 m	MPC · JPL
399239	2014 HH_{9}	—	March 10, 2000	Kitt Peak	Spacewatch	·	770 m	MPC · JPL
399240	2014 HO_{10}	—	May 30, 2006	Mount Lemmon	Mount Lemmon Survey	·	1.1 km	MPC · JPL
399241	2014 HL_{12}	—	May 3, 2006	Kitt Peak	Spacewatch	·	1.3 km	MPC · JPL
399242	2014 HH_{13}	—	March 12, 2010	Mount Lemmon	Mount Lemmon Survey	·	1.8 km	MPC · JPL
399243	2014 HR_{13}	—	December 1, 2005	Mount Lemmon	Mount Lemmon Survey	NYS	1.2 km	MPC · JPL
399244	2014 HG_{19}	—	April 12, 1999	Kitt Peak	Spacewatch	·	1.3 km	MPC · JPL
399245	2014 HA_{23}	—	October 19, 2007	Mount Lemmon	Mount Lemmon Survey	·	2.6 km	MPC · JPL
399246	2014 HJ_{25}	—	May 11, 2007	Mount Lemmon	Mount Lemmon Survey	NYS	910 m	MPC · JPL
399247	2014 HW_{25}	—	November 6, 2005	Mount Lemmon	Mount Lemmon Survey	·	620 m	MPC · JPL
399248	2014 HB_{26}	—	February 24, 2008	Mount Lemmon	Mount Lemmon Survey	·	2.1 km	MPC · JPL
399249	2014 HC_{26}	—	April 4, 2003	Kitt Peak	Spacewatch	NYS	930 m	MPC · JPL
399250	2014 HN_{26}	—	October 8, 2005	Kitt Peak	Spacewatch	·	3.1 km	MPC · JPL
399251	2014 HL_{27}	—	December 22, 2005	Kitt Peak	Spacewatch	·	1.2 km	MPC · JPL
399252	2014 HZ_{28}	—	September 26, 2006	Kitt Peak	Spacewatch	AEO	1.3 km	MPC · JPL
399253	2014 HF_{30}	—	April 24, 2006	Kitt Peak	Spacewatch	(5)	1.3 km	MPC · JPL
399254	2014 HA_{31}	—	February 12, 2004	Kitt Peak	Spacewatch	·	800 m	MPC · JPL
399255	2014 HM_{31}	—	December 1, 2005	Mount Lemmon	Mount Lemmon Survey	ERI	2.0 km	MPC · JPL
399256	2014 HM_{32}	—	May 8, 2010	Mount Lemmon	Mount Lemmon Survey	·	880 m	MPC · JPL
399257	2014 HK_{33}	—	April 20, 2009	Kitt Peak	Spacewatch	·	3.4 km	MPC · JPL
399258	2014 HX_{35}	—	October 27, 2005	Kitt Peak	Spacewatch	TIR	3.5 km	MPC · JPL
399259	2014 HL_{36}	—	February 26, 2009	Kitt Peak	Spacewatch	HOF	2.8 km	MPC · JPL
399260	2014 HO_{41}	—	December 25, 2005	Mount Lemmon	Mount Lemmon Survey	MAS	740 m	MPC · JPL
399261	2014 HJ_{42}	—	April 29, 2003	Kitt Peak	Spacewatch	EOS	2.1 km	MPC · JPL
399262	2014 HN_{43}	—	April 24, 2007	Kitt Peak	Spacewatch	V	750 m	MPC · JPL
399263	2014 HY_{46}	—	March 13, 2007	Mount Lemmon	Mount Lemmon Survey	V	720 m	MPC · JPL
399264	2014 HZ_{46}	—	February 12, 2008	Kitt Peak	Spacewatch	·	2.3 km	MPC · JPL
399265	2014 HT_{47}	—	June 19, 2010	WISE	WISE	·	2.8 km	MPC · JPL
399266	2014 HX_{47}	—	April 10, 2005	Mount Lemmon	Mount Lemmon Survey	·	1.7 km	MPC · JPL
399267	2014 HH_{48}	—	October 10, 2007	Mount Lemmon	Mount Lemmon Survey	·	1.4 km	MPC · JPL
399268	2014 HL_{60}	—	October 8, 2005	Kitt Peak	Spacewatch	·	2.5 km	MPC · JPL
399269	2014 HC_{61}	—	March 16, 2004	Kitt Peak	Spacewatch	·	1.8 km	MPC · JPL
399270	2014 HQ_{69}	—	December 14, 2004	Socorro	LINEAR	·	1.7 km	MPC · JPL
399271	2014 HK_{73}	—	October 6, 2004	Kitt Peak	Spacewatch	CYB	3.7 km	MPC · JPL
399272	2014 HE_{74}	—	October 20, 2007	Mount Lemmon	Mount Lemmon Survey	AGN	880 m	MPC · JPL
399273	2014 HT_{76}	—	November 16, 2006	Kitt Peak	Spacewatch	·	2.0 km	MPC · JPL
399274	2014 HA_{81}	—	October 2, 2006	Mount Lemmon	Mount Lemmon Survey	·	2.0 km	MPC · JPL
399275	2014 HY_{81}	—	September 28, 2006	Kitt Peak	Spacewatch	AGN	1.1 km	MPC · JPL
399276	2014 HN_{83}	—	May 10, 2005	Kitt Peak	Spacewatch	AGN	1.2 km	MPC · JPL
399277	2014 HD_{85}	—	June 16, 2007	Kitt Peak	Spacewatch	·	1.6 km	MPC · JPL
399278	2014 HH_{89}	—	November 5, 2005	Catalina	CSS	·	1.8 km	MPC · JPL
399279	2014 HL_{97}	—	February 19, 2001	Kitt Peak	Spacewatch	·	1.4 km	MPC · JPL
399280	2014 HR_{115}	—	February 19, 2009	Mount Lemmon	Mount Lemmon Survey	GEF	1 km	MPC · JPL
399281	2014 HK_{116}	—	December 1, 2006	Mount Lemmon	Mount Lemmon Survey	·	3.6 km	MPC · JPL
399282	2014 HV_{123}	—	October 12, 2004	Anderson Mesa	LONEOS	H	520 m	MPC · JPL
399283	2014 HU_{124}	—	May 2, 2003	Kitt Peak	Spacewatch	·	5.0 km	MPC · JPL
399284	2014 HD_{125}	—	October 19, 2006	Kitt Peak	Spacewatch	·	1.9 km	MPC · JPL
399285	2014 HB_{130}	—	March 31, 2003	Anderson Mesa	LONEOS	·	1.3 km	MPC · JPL
399286	2014 HD_{131}	—	January 22, 2006	Mount Lemmon	Mount Lemmon Survey	MAS	660 m	MPC · JPL
399287	2014 HY_{131}	—	March 9, 2007	Mount Lemmon	Mount Lemmon Survey	·	2.9 km	MPC · JPL
399288	2014 HZ_{131}	—	April 18, 2007	Kitt Peak	Spacewatch	·	680 m	MPC · JPL
399289	2014 HR_{143}	—	March 13, 2007	Mount Lemmon	Mount Lemmon Survey	·	1.1 km	MPC · JPL
399290	2014 HS_{143}	—	December 3, 2008	Mount Lemmon	Mount Lemmon Survey	·	1.5 km	MPC · JPL
399291	2014 HB_{146}	—	October 28, 2005	Kitt Peak	Spacewatch	·	870 m	MPC · JPL
399292	2014 HW_{146}	—	April 24, 2007	Kitt Peak	Spacewatch	·	680 m	MPC · JPL
399293	2014 HF_{151}	—	April 23, 2010	WISE	WISE	·	3.4 km	MPC · JPL
399294	2014 HS_{153}	—	October 29, 2005	Mount Lemmon	Mount Lemmon Survey	·	660 m	MPC · JPL
399295	2014 HX_{155}	—	October 24, 2005	Kitt Peak	Spacewatch	·	570 m	MPC · JPL
399296	2014 HE_{160}	—	August 10, 2004	Socorro	LINEAR	·	710 m	MPC · JPL
399297	2014 HL_{168}	—	April 30, 2004	Kitt Peak	Spacewatch	·	720 m	MPC · JPL
399298	2014 HZ_{172}	—	November 4, 2005	Mount Lemmon	Mount Lemmon Survey	·	2.6 km	MPC · JPL
399299	2014 HW_{181}	—	November 21, 2008	Kitt Peak	Spacewatch	·	2.6 km	MPC · JPL
399300	2014 HC_{183}	—	September 30, 1997	Kitt Peak	Spacewatch	·	1.6 km	MPC · JPL

== 399301–399400 ==
back to top

Designation			Discovery			Properties		Ref
Permanent	Provisional	Named after	Date	Site	Discoverer(s)	Category	Diam.	Ref
399301	2014 HB_{185}	—	October 6, 2005	Kitt Peak	Spacewatch	·	700 m	MPC · JPL
399302	2014 HZ_{185}	—	December 15, 1999	Kitt Peak	Spacewatch	·	1.8 km	MPC · JPL
399303	2014 HG_{186}	—	March 18, 2004	Kitt Peak	Spacewatch	·	710 m	MPC · JPL
399304	2014 HX_{186}	—	September 19, 1995	Kitt Peak	Spacewatch	(5)	1.6 km	MPC · JPL
399305	2014 JR	—	March 23, 2003	Kitt Peak	Spacewatch	·	1.2 km	MPC · JPL
399306	5400 T-3	—	October 16, 1977	Palomar	C. J. van Houten, I. van Houten-Groeneveld, T. Gehrels	·	660 m	MPC · JPL
399307	1991 RJ_{2}	—	September 8, 1991	Palomar	E. F. Helin	AMO · moon	600 m	MPC · JPL
399308	1993 GD	—	April 15, 1993	Kitt Peak	Spacewatch	APO	270 m	MPC · JPL
399309	1994 UQ_{8}	—	October 28, 1994	Kitt Peak	Spacewatch	·	1.5 km	MPC · JPL
399310	1994 XB	—	December 1, 1994	Kitt Peak	Spacewatch	·	630 m	MPC · JPL
399311	1994 XR_{3}	—	December 2, 1994	Kitt Peak	Spacewatch	·	620 m	MPC · JPL
399312	1995 UA_{58}	—	October 17, 1995	Kitt Peak	Spacewatch	·	1.6 km	MPC · JPL
399313	1995 UR_{73}	—	October 20, 1995	Kitt Peak	Spacewatch	·	1.1 km	MPC · JPL
399314	1996 RG_{4}	—	September 10, 1996	Kuma Kogen	A. Nakamura	·	2.1 km	MPC · JPL
399315	1996 TP_{25}	—	October 6, 1996	Kitt Peak	Spacewatch	·	1.2 km	MPC · JPL
399316	1996 XV_{17}	—	December 7, 1996	Kitt Peak	Spacewatch	MAS	810 m	MPC · JPL
399317	1997 EB_{30}	—	March 7, 1997	Kitt Peak	Spacewatch	·	970 m	MPC · JPL
399318	1997 XJ_{1}	—	December 4, 1997	Dynic	A. Sugie	PHO	1.4 km	MPC · JPL
399319	1997 YA_{14}	—	December 31, 1997	Oizumi	T. Kobayashi	PHO	1.4 km	MPC · JPL
399320	1998 ML_{17}	—	June 27, 1998	Kitt Peak	Spacewatch	·	3.0 km	MPC · JPL
399321	1998 QL_{52}	—	August 17, 1998	Socorro	LINEAR	·	1.2 km	MPC · JPL
399322	1998 QW_{63}	—	August 31, 1998	Xinglong	SCAP	·	5.4 km	MPC · JPL
399323	1998 SD_{177}	—	September 18, 1998	Catalina	CSS	·	2.9 km	MPC · JPL
399324	1998 VO_{46}	—	November 14, 1998	Kitt Peak	Spacewatch	·	2.9 km	MPC · JPL
399325	1999 GY_{5}	—	April 14, 1999	Socorro	LINEAR	APO	670 m	MPC · JPL
399326	1999 RA_{114}	—	September 9, 1999	Socorro	LINEAR	·	1.5 km	MPC · JPL
399327	1999 TV_{56}	—	October 6, 1999	Kitt Peak	Spacewatch	·	2.0 km	MPC · JPL
399328	1999 TJ_{183}	—	October 11, 1999	Socorro	LINEAR	NYS	1.4 km	MPC · JPL
399329	1999 TF_{232}	—	October 5, 1999	Anderson Mesa	LONEOS	·	2.5 km	MPC · JPL
399330	1999 TV_{241}	—	October 4, 1999	Catalina	CSS	T_{j} (2.93)	4.2 km	MPC · JPL
399331	1999 TW_{243}	—	October 6, 1999	Kitt Peak	Spacewatch	·	2.3 km	MPC · JPL
399332	1999 UC_{28}	—	October 30, 1999	Kitt Peak	Spacewatch	·	1.9 km	MPC · JPL
399333	1999 VT_{83}	—	October 10, 1999	Socorro	LINEAR	·	3.0 km	MPC · JPL
399334	1999 XS_{55}	—	December 7, 1999	Socorro	LINEAR	·	1.8 km	MPC · JPL
399335	1999 XA_{241}	—	December 8, 1999	Socorro	LINEAR	PHO	1.1 km	MPC · JPL
399336	1999 YY_{28}	—	December 18, 1999	Kitt Peak	Spacewatch	TIR	3.3 km	MPC · JPL
399337	2000 CN_{39}	—	February 4, 2000	Višnjan	K. Korlević	H	680 m	MPC · JPL
399338	2000 CA_{109}	—	February 5, 2000	Kitt Peak	M. W. Buie	·	1.5 km	MPC · JPL
399339	2000 JR_{8}	—	May 6, 2000	Socorro	LINEAR	H	640 m	MPC · JPL
399340	2000 LM_{36}	—	June 1, 2000	Haleakala	NEAT	·	1.6 km	MPC · JPL
399341	2000 QX_{43}	—	August 24, 2000	Socorro	LINEAR	·	1.2 km	MPC · JPL
399342	2000 QY_{220}	—	August 21, 2000	Anderson Mesa	LONEOS	·	810 m	MPC · JPL
399343	2000 RF_{89}	—	September 3, 2000	Socorro	LINEAR	V	730 m	MPC · JPL
399344	2000 SV_{19}	—	September 23, 2000	Socorro	LINEAR	·	2.7 km	MPC · JPL
399345	2000 SU_{75}	—	September 24, 2000	Socorro	LINEAR	·	1.3 km	MPC · JPL
399346	2000 SK_{96}	—	September 23, 2000	Socorro	LINEAR	·	1.3 km	MPC · JPL
399347	2000 SN_{126}	—	September 24, 2000	Socorro	LINEAR	·	1.1 km	MPC · JPL
399348	2000 SA_{181}	—	September 19, 2000	Kitt Peak	Spacewatch	·	800 m	MPC · JPL
399349	2000 SK_{267}	—	September 27, 2000	Socorro	LINEAR	·	860 m	MPC · JPL
399350	2000 SE_{297}	—	September 28, 2000	Socorro	LINEAR	·	1.2 km	MPC · JPL
399351	2000 SK_{297}	—	September 28, 2000	Socorro	LINEAR	·	1.2 km	MPC · JPL
399352	2000 SN_{320}	—	September 30, 2000	Kitt Peak	Spacewatch	TEL	1.2 km	MPC · JPL
399353	2000 SO_{330}	—	September 27, 2000	Kitt Peak	Spacewatch	NYS	810 m	MPC · JPL
399354	2000 US_{36}	—	October 24, 2000	Socorro	LINEAR	ERI	1.6 km	MPC · JPL
399355	2000 UZ_{61}	—	October 25, 2000	Socorro	LINEAR	·	1.2 km	MPC · JPL
399356	2000 WG_{12}	—	November 24, 2000	Kitt Peak	Spacewatch	·	1.5 km	MPC · JPL
399357	2000 WV_{19}	—	November 19, 2000	Kitt Peak	Spacewatch	·	1.3 km	MPC · JPL
399358	2000 WG_{21}	—	November 20, 2000	Socorro	LINEAR	PHO	1.1 km	MPC · JPL
399359	2000 WA_{154}	—	November 30, 2000	Socorro	LINEAR	·	4.0 km	MPC · JPL
399360	2000 XL_{54}	—	December 2, 2000	Haleakala	NEAT	·	1.4 km	MPC · JPL
399361	2001 BG_{81}	—	January 19, 2001	Haleakala	NEAT	EUN	1.5 km	MPC · JPL
399362	2001 HE_{18}	—	April 21, 2001	Socorro	LINEAR	·	3.4 km	MPC · JPL
399363	2001 HL_{60}	—	April 24, 2001	Anderson Mesa	LONEOS	JUN	1.3 km	MPC · JPL
399364	2001 KD_{1}	—	May 17, 2001	Socorro	LINEAR	·	2.3 km	MPC · JPL
399365	2001 NM_{11}	—	July 11, 2001	Palomar	NEAT	BAR	1.5 km	MPC · JPL
399366	2001 OS_{62}	—	July 20, 2001	Anderson Mesa	LONEOS	·	1.9 km	MPC · JPL
399367	2001 OE_{74}	—	July 16, 2001	Anderson Mesa	LONEOS	·	2.0 km	MPC · JPL
399368	2001 PF_{36}	—	August 11, 2001	Palomar	NEAT	EUN	1.2 km	MPC · JPL
399369	2001 PB_{59}	—	August 14, 2001	Haleakala	NEAT	·	1.6 km	MPC · JPL
399370	2001 QL_{91}	—	August 16, 2001	Socorro	LINEAR	JUN	1.4 km	MPC · JPL
399371	2001 QF_{115}	—	August 17, 2001	Socorro	LINEAR	·	1.4 km	MPC · JPL
399372	2001 QF_{158}	—	August 23, 2001	Anderson Mesa	LONEOS	·	2.4 km	MPC · JPL
399373	2001 QT_{189}	—	August 22, 2001	Socorro	LINEAR	JUN	890 m	MPC · JPL
399374	2001 QA_{190}	—	August 22, 2001	Socorro	LINEAR	JUN	1.5 km	MPC · JPL
399375	2001 QL_{190}	—	August 22, 2001	Socorro	LINEAR	JUN	1.5 km	MPC · JPL
399376	2001 QW_{190}	—	August 22, 2001	Socorro	LINEAR	·	1.5 km	MPC · JPL
399377	2001 QO_{193}	—	August 22, 2001	Socorro	LINEAR	·	2.0 km	MPC · JPL
399378	2001 QK_{242}	—	August 24, 2001	Socorro	LINEAR	·	1.7 km	MPC · JPL
399379	2001 RQ_{13}	—	August 27, 2001	Kitt Peak	Spacewatch	·	580 m	MPC · JPL
399380	2001 RC_{16}	—	September 11, 2001	Socorro	LINEAR	H	700 m	MPC · JPL
399381	2001 RZ_{25}	—	September 7, 2001	Socorro	LINEAR	JUN	1.1 km	MPC · JPL
399382	2001 RK_{33}	—	September 8, 2001	Socorro	LINEAR	·	600 m	MPC · JPL
399383	2001 RP_{37}	—	November 1, 1997	Kitt Peak	Spacewatch	LEO	1.7 km	MPC · JPL
399384	2001 RW_{53}	—	September 12, 2001	Socorro	LINEAR	·	1.5 km	MPC · JPL
399385	2001 SH_{123}	—	September 16, 2001	Socorro	LINEAR	·	680 m	MPC · JPL
399386	2001 SZ_{123}	—	September 16, 2001	Socorro	LINEAR	·	2.1 km	MPC · JPL
399387	2001 ST_{144}	—	September 16, 2001	Socorro	LINEAR	AGN	1.3 km	MPC · JPL
399388	2001 SL_{169}	—	September 20, 2001	Socorro	LINEAR	·	680 m	MPC · JPL
399389	2001 SA_{177}	—	September 16, 2001	Socorro	LINEAR	·	1.6 km	MPC · JPL
399390	2001 SH_{194}	—	September 19, 2001	Socorro	LINEAR	·	1.8 km	MPC · JPL
399391	2001 SF_{196}	—	September 19, 2001	Socorro	LINEAR	·	1.1 km	MPC · JPL
399392	2001 SK_{197}	—	September 19, 2001	Socorro	LINEAR	·	550 m	MPC · JPL
399393	2001 SE_{214}	—	September 19, 2001	Socorro	LINEAR	·	600 m	MPC · JPL
399394	2001 SL_{287}	—	September 29, 2001	Emerald Lane	L. Ball	DOR	2.2 km	MPC · JPL
399395	2001 SM_{290}	—	September 29, 2001	Palomar	NEAT	·	2.9 km	MPC · JPL
399396	2001 SY_{305}	—	September 10, 2001	Socorro	LINEAR	·	710 m	MPC · JPL
399397	2001 SB_{306}	—	September 20, 2001	Socorro	LINEAR	·	2.6 km	MPC · JPL
399398	2001 SV_{312}	—	September 12, 2001	Socorro	LINEAR	·	600 m	MPC · JPL
399399	2001 SO_{322}	—	September 25, 2001	Socorro	LINEAR	·	2.3 km	MPC · JPL
399400	2001 SL_{339}	—	September 21, 2001	Palomar	NEAT	·	2.1 km	MPC · JPL

== 399401–399500 ==
back to top

Designation			Discovery			Properties		Ref
Permanent	Provisional	Named after	Date	Site	Discoverer(s)	Category	Diam.	Ref
399401	2001 ST_{342}	—	September 21, 2001	Palomar	NEAT	·	2.9 km	MPC · JPL
399402	2001 SM_{345}	—	September 23, 2001	Haleakala	NEAT	·	840 m	MPC · JPL
399403	2001 TS	—	October 8, 2001	Palomar	NEAT	·	4.2 km	MPC · JPL
399404	2001 TL_{54}	—	October 14, 2001	Socorro	LINEAR	·	600 m	MPC · JPL
399405	2001 TB_{57}	—	October 13, 2001	Socorro	LINEAR	·	940 m	MPC · JPL
399406	2001 TA_{90}	—	October 14, 2001	Socorro	LINEAR	·	840 m	MPC · JPL
399407	2001 TV_{133}	—	October 12, 2001	Haleakala	NEAT	·	1.8 km	MPC · JPL
399408	2001 TB_{143}	—	October 10, 2001	Palomar	NEAT	·	670 m	MPC · JPL
399409	2001 TZ_{175}	—	September 20, 2001	Socorro	LINEAR	·	1.5 km	MPC · JPL
399410	2001 TP_{199}	—	October 11, 2001	Socorro	LINEAR	·	1.9 km	MPC · JPL
399411 Ayiomamitis	2001 TV_{257}	Ayiomamitis	October 10, 2001	Palomar	NEAT	·	730 m	MPC · JPL
399412	2001 TX_{258}	—	October 14, 2001	Apache Point	SDSS	·	680 m	MPC · JPL
399413	2001 UW_{39}	—	October 17, 2001	Socorro	LINEAR	·	750 m	MPC · JPL
399414	2001 UP_{176}	—	October 25, 2001	Kitt Peak	Spacewatch	·	610 m	MPC · JPL
399415	2001 UU_{196}	—	October 19, 2001	Anderson Mesa	LONEOS	·	2.0 km	MPC · JPL
399416	2001 UW_{220}	—	October 21, 2001	Socorro	LINEAR	·	1.9 km	MPC · JPL
399417	2001 VE_{25}	—	November 9, 2001	Socorro	LINEAR	·	2.2 km	MPC · JPL
399418	2001 VD_{77}	—	November 12, 2001	Haleakala	NEAT	·	2.3 km	MPC · JPL
399419	2001 VL_{104}	—	November 12, 2001	Socorro	LINEAR	·	2.5 km	MPC · JPL
399420	2001 WY_{54}	—	November 19, 2001	Socorro	LINEAR	·	1.6 km	MPC · JPL
399421	2001 WO_{92}	—	November 21, 2001	Socorro	LINEAR	·	620 m	MPC · JPL
399422	2001 WH_{93}	—	November 21, 2001	Haleakala	NEAT	·	2.3 km	MPC · JPL
399423	2001 XA_{31}	—	December 9, 2001	Socorro	LINEAR	H	680 m	MPC · JPL
399424	2001 XD_{50}	—	December 10, 2001	Socorro	LINEAR	TIN	2.0 km	MPC · JPL
399425	2001 XY_{57}	—	December 11, 2001	Socorro	LINEAR	H	720 m	MPC · JPL
399426	2001 XW_{102}	—	December 14, 2001	Socorro	LINEAR	·	860 m	MPC · JPL
399427	2001 XM_{169}	—	December 14, 2001	Socorro	LINEAR	PHO	1.0 km	MPC · JPL
399428	2001 XB_{183}	—	December 14, 2001	Socorro	LINEAR	·	2.7 km	MPC · JPL
399429	2001 XP_{205}	—	December 11, 2001	Socorro	LINEAR	·	2.1 km	MPC · JPL
399430	2001 XB_{226}	—	November 24, 2001	Socorro	LINEAR	H	620 m	MPC · JPL
399431	2001 XM_{228}	—	November 12, 2001	Socorro	LINEAR	GEF	1.2 km	MPC · JPL
399432	2001 YZ_{2}	—	November 20, 2001	Socorro	LINEAR	H	720 m	MPC · JPL
399433	2001 YK_{4}	—	December 23, 2001	Anderson Mesa	LONEOS	T_{j} (2.86) · APO +1km	1.3 km	MPC · JPL
399434	2001 YM_{53}	—	December 18, 2001	Socorro	LINEAR	·	3.8 km	MPC · JPL
399435	2001 YG_{115}	—	December 9, 2001	Socorro	LINEAR	·	1.0 km	MPC · JPL
399436	2002 AT_{30}	—	January 9, 2002	Socorro	LINEAR	·	3.2 km	MPC · JPL
399437	2002 AD_{129}	—	January 14, 2002	Socorro	LINEAR	H	670 m	MPC · JPL
399438	2002 AE_{130}	—	January 8, 2002	Socorro	LINEAR	H	710 m	MPC · JPL
399439	2002 AC_{136}	—	January 9, 2002	Socorro	LINEAR	·	2.9 km	MPC · JPL
399440	2002 AY_{205}	—	January 13, 2002	Apache Point	SDSS	·	2.5 km	MPC · JPL
399441	2002 AR_{208}	—	January 9, 2002	Kitt Peak	Spacewatch	·	950 m	MPC · JPL
399442 Radicofani	2002 CB_{1}	Radicofani	February 2, 2002	Cima Ekar	ADAS	·	2.4 km	MPC · JPL
399443	2002 ER_{108}	—	March 9, 2002	Palomar	NEAT	·	1.3 km	MPC · JPL
399444	2002 EO_{158}	—	March 5, 2002	Apache Point	SDSS	·	2.5 km	MPC · JPL
399445	2002 FE_{23}	—	March 17, 2002	Kitt Peak	Spacewatch	·	1.2 km	MPC · JPL
399446	2002 GF_{1}	—	April 2, 2002	Palomar	NEAT	AMO	260 m	MPC · JPL
399447	2002 GR_{97}	—	April 9, 2002	Kitt Peak	Spacewatch	·	1.3 km	MPC · JPL
399448	2002 GJ_{150}	—	April 14, 2002	Socorro	LINEAR	·	920 m	MPC · JPL
399449	2002 GS_{178}	—	April 14, 2002	Palomar	NEAT	MAS	780 m	MPC · JPL
399450	2002 JD_{4}	—	April 22, 2002	Anderson Mesa	LONEOS	T_{j} (2.99) · EUP	3.9 km	MPC · JPL
399451	2002 JU_{108}	—	May 6, 2002	Socorro	LINEAR	·	4.1 km	MPC · JPL
399452	2002 JC_{114}	—	April 14, 2002	Socorro	LINEAR	PHO	1.2 km	MPC · JPL
399453	2002 NQ_{61}	—	July 6, 2002	Palomar	NEAT	·	1.2 km	MPC · JPL
399454	2002 OH_{14}	—	July 18, 2002	Socorro	LINEAR	·	1.4 km	MPC · JPL
399455	2002 OZ_{28}	—	July 19, 2002	Palomar	NEAT	(5)	1.3 km	MPC · JPL
399456	2002 PN_{27}	—	July 14, 2002	Socorro	LINEAR	(5)	1.3 km	MPC · JPL
399457	2002 PD_{43}	—	August 7, 2002	Palomar	NEAT	T_{j} (2.44) · APO · PHA	490 m	MPC · JPL
399458	2002 PC_{80}	—	August 4, 2002	Palomar	NEAT	EUN	1.2 km	MPC · JPL
399459	2002 PZ_{105}	—	August 12, 2002	Socorro	LINEAR	·	1.5 km	MPC · JPL
399460	2002 PK_{169}	—	August 8, 2002	Palomar	NEAT	CYB	3.5 km	MPC · JPL
399461	2002 PL_{172}	—	August 8, 2002	Palomar	NEAT	·	1.5 km	MPC · JPL
399462	2002 PQ_{181}	—	August 15, 2002	Palomar	NEAT	·	1.4 km	MPC · JPL
399463	2002 PB_{184}	—	August 7, 2002	Palomar	NEAT	·	3.5 km	MPC · JPL
399464	2002 QZ_{46}	—	August 30, 2002	Socorro	LINEAR	·	900 m	MPC · JPL
399465	2002 QY_{74}	—	August 19, 2002	Palomar	NEAT	EUN	810 m	MPC · JPL
399466	2002 QW_{85}	—	August 17, 2002	Palomar	NEAT	·	1.3 km	MPC · JPL
399467	2002 QG_{125}	—	August 27, 2002	Palomar	NEAT	·	1.8 km	MPC · JPL
399468	2002 QC_{137}	—	August 28, 2002	Palomar	NEAT	(5)	1.2 km	MPC · JPL
399469	2002 QG_{140}	—	August 20, 2002	Palomar	NEAT	·	1.0 km	MPC · JPL
399470	2002 RR_{4}	—	August 15, 2002	Socorro	LINEAR	·	1.1 km	MPC · JPL
399471	2002 RN_{5}	—	September 3, 2002	Palomar	NEAT	EUN	1.5 km	MPC · JPL
399472	2002 RR_{136}	—	September 11, 2002	Haleakala	NEAT	·	980 m	MPC · JPL
399473	2002 RR_{167}	—	September 13, 2002	Palomar	NEAT	·	1.2 km	MPC · JPL
399474	2002 RY_{168}	—	September 13, 2002	Palomar	NEAT	·	990 m	MPC · JPL
399475	2002 RZ_{244}	—	September 11, 2002	Haleakala	NEAT	·	930 m	MPC · JPL
399476	2002 RP_{261}	—	September 13, 2002	Palomar	NEAT	·	1.3 km	MPC · JPL
399477	2002 RF_{266}	—	September 15, 2002	Palomar	NEAT	(5)	960 m	MPC · JPL
399478	2002 RS_{267}	—	September 3, 2002	Palomar	NEAT	·	1.1 km	MPC · JPL
399479	2002 RP_{273}	—	September 4, 2002	Palomar	NEAT	·	1.6 km	MPC · JPL
399480	2002 RB_{277}	—	September 14, 2002	Palomar	NEAT	·	1.2 km	MPC · JPL
399481	2002 SW_{9}	—	September 27, 2002	Palomar	NEAT	·	1.7 km	MPC · JPL
399482	2002 SK_{15}	—	September 27, 2002	Palomar	NEAT	EUN	1.6 km	MPC · JPL
399483	2002 SN_{29}	—	September 28, 2002	Palomar	NEAT	·	850 m	MPC · JPL
399484	2002 SA_{62}	—	September 17, 2002	Palomar	NEAT	·	740 m	MPC · JPL
399485	2002 TD_{11}	—	October 1, 2002	Anderson Mesa	LONEOS	·	1.6 km	MPC · JPL
399486	2002 TQ_{34}	—	October 2, 2002	Socorro	LINEAR	·	1.1 km	MPC · JPL
399487	2002 TS_{36}	—	October 2, 2002	Socorro	LINEAR	(5)	1.0 km	MPC · JPL
399488	2002 TA_{46}	—	October 2, 2002	Socorro	LINEAR	·	1.2 km	MPC · JPL
399489	2002 TO_{55}	—	October 2, 2002	Haleakala	NEAT	·	2.1 km	MPC · JPL
399490	2002 TR_{133}	—	October 4, 2002	Anderson Mesa	LONEOS	·	940 m	MPC · JPL
399491	2002 TN_{136}	—	October 4, 2002	Anderson Mesa	LONEOS	·	2.0 km	MPC · JPL
399492	2002 TB_{143}	—	October 4, 2002	Socorro	LINEAR	·	970 m	MPC · JPL
399493	2002 TA_{159}	—	October 5, 2002	Palomar	NEAT	·	2.7 km	MPC · JPL
399494	2002 TA_{165}	—	October 2, 2002	Haleakala	NEAT	·	1.3 km	MPC · JPL
399495	2002 TA_{173}	—	October 4, 2002	Socorro	LINEAR	·	1.6 km	MPC · JPL
399496	2002 TH_{181}	—	October 14, 2002	Palomar	NEAT	BAR	1.6 km	MPC · JPL
399497	2002 TV_{190}	—	October 1, 2002	Socorro	LINEAR	MAR	1.4 km	MPC · JPL
399498	2002 TN_{203}	—	October 4, 2002	Socorro	LINEAR	·	750 m	MPC · JPL
399499	2002 TA_{232}	—	October 6, 2002	Socorro	LINEAR	EUN	1.8 km	MPC · JPL
399500	2002 TX_{277}	—	October 10, 2002	Socorro	LINEAR	EUN	1.7 km	MPC · JPL

== 399501–399600 ==
back to top

Designation			Discovery			Properties		Ref
Permanent	Provisional	Named after	Date	Site	Discoverer(s)	Category	Diam.	Ref
399501	2002 TN_{307}	—	October 4, 2002	Apache Point	SDSS	·	1.6 km	MPC · JPL
399502	2002 TJ_{353}	—	October 10, 2002	Apache Point	SDSS	(5)	870 m	MPC · JPL
399503	2002 TO_{377}	—	October 15, 2002	Palomar	NEAT	·	750 m	MPC · JPL
399504	2002 UA_{1}	—	October 27, 2002	Socorro	LINEAR	H	600 m	MPC · JPL
399505	2002 UW_{7}	—	October 28, 2002	Palomar	NEAT	·	1.2 km	MPC · JPL
399506	2002 UN_{70}	—	October 28, 2002	Palomar	NEAT	·	1.8 km	MPC · JPL
399507	2002 VL_{3}	—	November 1, 2002	Palomar	NEAT	(5)	1.2 km	MPC · JPL
399508	2002 VX_{3}	—	November 1, 2002	Palomar	NEAT	MAR	1.6 km	MPC · JPL
399509	2002 VT_{6}	—	November 1, 2002	Palomar	NEAT	(5)	1.2 km	MPC · JPL
399510	2002 VU_{6}	—	November 1, 2002	Palomar	NEAT	EUN	1.4 km	MPC · JPL
399511	2002 VL_{27}	—	November 5, 2002	Socorro	LINEAR	·	1.2 km	MPC · JPL
399512	2002 VL_{42}	—	November 5, 2002	Palomar	NEAT	(5)	950 m	MPC · JPL
399513	2002 VQ_{54}	—	November 6, 2002	Anderson Mesa	LONEOS	EUN	1.4 km	MPC · JPL
399514	2002 VZ_{75}	—	November 7, 2002	Socorro	LINEAR	MIS	2.6 km	MPC · JPL
399515	2002 VT_{86}	—	November 8, 2002	Socorro	LINEAR	·	1.3 km	MPC · JPL
399516	2002 VL_{98}	—	November 12, 2002	Socorro	LINEAR	H	650 m	MPC · JPL
399517	2002 VO_{131}	—	November 1, 2002	Palomar	S. F. Hönig	(5)	1.2 km	MPC · JPL
399518	2002 VN_{134}	—	November 6, 2002	Anderson Mesa	LONEOS	KON	3.0 km	MPC · JPL
399519	2002 WX_{4}	—	November 24, 2002	Palomar	NEAT	·	2.8 km	MPC · JPL
399520	2002 WM_{5}	—	November 24, 2002	Palomar	NEAT	·	1.7 km	MPC · JPL
399521	2002 WR_{18}	—	November 30, 2002	Socorro	LINEAR	·	1.9 km	MPC · JPL
399522	2002 XD_{44}	—	December 6, 2002	Socorro	LINEAR	·	2.4 km	MPC · JPL
399523	2002 XH_{73}	—	December 11, 2002	Socorro	LINEAR	EUN	3.6 km	MPC · JPL
399524	2002 XV_{97}	—	December 5, 2002	Socorro	LINEAR	·	2.5 km	MPC · JPL
399525	2002 YU_{27}	—	December 31, 2002	Socorro	LINEAR	·	2.0 km	MPC · JPL
399526	2003 AA_{17}	—	December 7, 2002	Socorro	LINEAR	·	600 m	MPC · JPL
399527	2003 BT_{23}	—	January 25, 2003	Palomar	NEAT	·	2.2 km	MPC · JPL
399528	2003 CE_{15}	—	February 4, 2003	Socorro	LINEAR	·	940 m	MPC · JPL
399529	2003 EJ_{31}	—	March 7, 2003	Anderson Mesa	LONEOS	·	910 m	MPC · JPL
399530	2003 GT_{34}	—	April 7, 2003	Kitt Peak	Spacewatch	·	1.8 km	MPC · JPL
399531	2003 HH_{39}	—	April 29, 2003	Socorro	LINEAR	·	1.8 km	MPC · JPL
399532	2003 HB_{55}	—	April 25, 2003	Kitt Peak	Spacewatch	MAS	700 m	MPC · JPL
399533	2003 KG_{6}	—	May 5, 2003	Socorro	LINEAR	·	840 m	MPC · JPL
399534	2003 KQ_{19}	—	May 29, 2003	Socorro	LINEAR	H	770 m	MPC · JPL
399535	2003 KR_{28}	—	May 22, 2003	Kitt Peak	Spacewatch	·	1.9 km	MPC · JPL
399536	2003 MV_{2}	—	June 25, 2003	Nogales	M. Schwartz, P. R. Holvorcem	NYS	800 m	MPC · JPL
399537	2003 NB_{9}	—	July 4, 2003	Socorro	LINEAR	T_{j} (2.95)	5.6 km	MPC · JPL
399538	2003 NK_{11}	—	July 3, 2003	Kitt Peak	Spacewatch	EUP	3.3 km	MPC · JPL
399539	2003 OP_{33}	—	July 30, 2003	Socorro	LINEAR	PHO	1.0 km	MPC · JPL
399540	2003 PT_{6}	—	August 1, 2003	Socorro	LINEAR	·	4.0 km	MPC · JPL
399541	2003 PO_{7}	—	August 2, 2003	Haleakala	NEAT	·	3.3 km	MPC · JPL
399542	2003 PF_{9}	—	August 4, 2003	Socorro	LINEAR	·	1.3 km	MPC · JPL
399543	2003 QU_{1}	—	August 19, 2003	Campo Imperatore	CINEOS	·	3.4 km	MPC · JPL
399544	2003 QH_{2}	—	August 20, 2003	Socorro	LINEAR	·	5.4 km	MPC · JPL
399545	2003 QA_{14}	—	August 20, 2003	Palomar	NEAT	·	1.4 km	MPC · JPL
399546	2003 QW_{14}	—	August 20, 2003	Palomar	NEAT	·	2.6 km	MPC · JPL
399547	2003 QT_{24}	—	August 22, 2003	Campo Imperatore	CINEOS	·	2.9 km	MPC · JPL
399548	2003 QY_{27}	—	August 20, 2003	Palomar	NEAT	·	3.9 km	MPC · JPL
399549	2003 QO_{45}	—	August 23, 2003	Palomar	NEAT	NYS	1.2 km	MPC · JPL
399550	2003 QC_{111}	—	August 31, 2003	Socorro	LINEAR	LIX	4.7 km	MPC · JPL
399551	2003 RN_{9}	—	September 4, 2003	Socorro	LINEAR	·	3.3 km	MPC · JPL
399552	2003 RM_{23}	—	September 14, 2003	Palomar	NEAT	·	1.9 km	MPC · JPL
399553	2003 RG_{27}	—	September 1, 2003	Socorro	LINEAR	THB	3.6 km	MPC · JPL
399554	2003 SB	—	September 16, 2003	Palomar	NEAT	·	1.5 km	MPC · JPL
399555	2003 SA_{27}	—	September 18, 2003	Palomar	NEAT	·	4.2 km	MPC · JPL
399556	2003 ST_{32}	—	August 26, 2003	Socorro	LINEAR	·	1.6 km	MPC · JPL
399557	2003 SX_{44}	—	September 16, 2003	Anderson Mesa	LONEOS	NYS	1.5 km	MPC · JPL
399558	2003 SR_{66}	—	September 18, 2003	Campo Imperatore	CINEOS	·	1.3 km	MPC · JPL
399559	2003 SS_{70}	—	September 18, 2003	Kitt Peak	Spacewatch	·	4.2 km	MPC · JPL
399560	2003 SC_{88}	—	September 18, 2003	Campo Imperatore	CINEOS	·	1.1 km	MPC · JPL
399561	2003 SQ_{97}	—	September 19, 2003	Palomar	NEAT	·	4.4 km	MPC · JPL
399562	2003 SA_{102}	—	September 20, 2003	Kitt Peak	Spacewatch	·	5.4 km	MPC · JPL
399563	2003 SH_{103}	—	September 20, 2003	Socorro	LINEAR	·	1.3 km	MPC · JPL
399564	2003 SA_{117}	—	September 16, 2003	Palomar	NEAT	·	3.8 km	MPC · JPL
399565 Dévényanna	2003 SZ_{128}	Dévényanna	September 20, 2003	Piszkéstető	K. Sárneczky, B. Sipőcz	·	1.4 km	MPC · JPL
399566	2003 SD_{145}	—	September 19, 2003	Haleakala	NEAT	THB	4.3 km	MPC · JPL
399567	2003 SG_{167}	—	September 22, 2003	Palomar	NEAT	·	1.2 km	MPC · JPL
399568	2003 SQ_{172}	—	September 18, 2003	Socorro	LINEAR	MAS	720 m	MPC · JPL
399569	2003 SO_{191}	—	September 19, 2003	Kitt Peak	Spacewatch	·	1.8 km	MPC · JPL
399570	2003 SF_{196}	—	September 20, 2003	Palomar	NEAT	·	1.1 km	MPC · JPL
399571	2003 SY_{205}	—	September 23, 2003	Palomar	NEAT	·	1.3 km	MPC · JPL
399572	2003 SP_{210}	—	September 23, 2003	Palomar	NEAT	·	2.7 km	MPC · JPL
399573	2003 SP_{221}	—	September 29, 2003	Prescott	P. G. Comba	·	1.4 km	MPC · JPL
399574	2003 SC_{246}	—	September 26, 2003	Socorro	LINEAR	·	1.3 km	MPC · JPL
399575	2003 ST_{258}	—	September 28, 2003	Kitt Peak	Spacewatch	·	1.2 km	MPC · JPL
399576	2003 SA_{261}	—	September 27, 2003	Socorro	LINEAR	·	1.3 km	MPC · JPL
399577	2003 SP_{273}	—	September 28, 2003	Kitt Peak	Spacewatch	THB	3.6 km	MPC · JPL
399578	2003 SZ_{277}	—	September 30, 2003	Socorro	LINEAR	·	2.6 km	MPC · JPL
399579	2003 SC_{298}	—	September 18, 2003	Haleakala	NEAT	·	3.4 km	MPC · JPL
399580	2003 SL_{315}	—	September 28, 2003	Anderson Mesa	LONEOS	·	3.8 km	MPC · JPL
399581	2003 SQ_{318}	—	September 18, 2003	Socorro	LINEAR	NYS	1.1 km	MPC · JPL
399582	2003 ST_{322}	—	September 16, 2003	Kitt Peak	Spacewatch	·	4.0 km	MPC · JPL
399583	2003 SG_{326}	—	September 18, 2003	Kitt Peak	Spacewatch	·	1.1 km	MPC · JPL
399584	2003 SX_{330}	—	September 26, 2003	Apache Point	SDSS	·	1.4 km	MPC · JPL
399585	2003 SH_{332}	—	September 28, 2003	Anderson Mesa	LONEOS	·	1.2 km	MPC · JPL
399586	2003 TQ_{7}	—	October 1, 2003	Anderson Mesa	LONEOS	·	1.6 km	MPC · JPL
399587	2003 TW_{9}	—	October 15, 2003	Socorro	LINEAR	·	1.8 km	MPC · JPL
399588	2003 TE_{13}	—	September 21, 2003	Anderson Mesa	LONEOS	·	1.3 km	MPC · JPL
399589	2003 TR_{44}	—	October 3, 2003	Kitt Peak	Spacewatch	·	3.9 km	MPC · JPL
399590	2003 UK_{6}	—	October 18, 2003	Palomar	NEAT	·	3.8 km	MPC · JPL
399591	2003 UY_{67}	—	October 16, 2003	Palomar	NEAT	·	1.2 km	MPC · JPL
399592	2003 UM_{107}	—	October 19, 2003	Anderson Mesa	LONEOS	·	5.2 km	MPC · JPL
399593	2003 UL_{121}	—	October 19, 2003	Kitt Peak	Spacewatch	MAS	770 m	MPC · JPL
399594	2003 UH_{162}	—	October 15, 2003	Anderson Mesa	LONEOS	·	1.4 km	MPC · JPL
399595	2003 US_{269}	—	October 19, 2003	Kitt Peak	Spacewatch	NYS	1.1 km	MPC · JPL
399596	2003 UV_{318}	—	September 30, 2003	Kitt Peak	Spacewatch	·	1.4 km	MPC · JPL
399597	2003 UN_{325}	—	September 17, 2003	Kitt Peak	Spacewatch	·	3.9 km	MPC · JPL
399598	2003 UR_{341}	—	October 19, 2003	Apache Point	SDSS	·	2.6 km	MPC · JPL
399599	2003 UO_{374}	—	October 22, 2003	Apache Point	SDSS	·	1.2 km	MPC · JPL
399600	2003 UU_{416}	—	October 22, 2003	Kitt Peak	Spacewatch	·	3.7 km	MPC · JPL

== 399601–399700 ==
back to top

Designation			Discovery			Properties		Ref
Permanent	Provisional	Named after	Date	Site	Discoverer(s)	Category	Diam.	Ref
399601	2003 WL_{21}	—	November 19, 2003	Catalina	CSS	·	1.9 km	MPC · JPL
399602	2003 WJ_{33}	—	November 18, 2003	Kitt Peak	Spacewatch	·	1.5 km	MPC · JPL
399603	2003 WZ_{59}	—	October 26, 2003	Kitt Peak	Spacewatch	HNS	1.4 km	MPC · JPL
399604	2003 WL_{61}	—	November 19, 2003	Kitt Peak	Spacewatch	·	1.4 km	MPC · JPL
399605	2003 WO_{103}	—	November 21, 2003	Socorro	LINEAR	CYB	3.9 km	MPC · JPL
399606	2003 WL_{108}	—	November 20, 2003	Palomar	NEAT	·	3.3 km	MPC · JPL
399607	2003 WD_{156}	—	October 21, 2003	Anderson Mesa	LONEOS	PHO · slow	1.1 km	MPC · JPL
399608	2003 YC_{31}	—	December 18, 2003	Socorro	LINEAR	·	1.5 km	MPC · JPL
399609	2003 YT_{140}	—	December 17, 2003	Socorro	LINEAR	·	1.8 km	MPC · JPL
399610	2003 YD_{148}	—	December 29, 2003	Catalina	CSS	·	1.7 km	MPC · JPL
399611	2004 BE_{11}	—	January 18, 2004	Catalina	CSS	AMO	510 m	MPC · JPL
399612	2004 BB_{51}	—	January 21, 2004	Socorro	LINEAR	MAR	1.1 km	MPC · JPL
399613	2004 BQ_{65}	—	January 22, 2004	Socorro	LINEAR	·	1.2 km	MPC · JPL
399614	2004 CH_{21}	—	February 11, 2004	Anderson Mesa	LONEOS	EUN	1.4 km	MPC · JPL
399615	2004 CC_{37}	—	February 12, 2004	Palomar	NEAT	·	2.2 km	MPC · JPL
399616	2004 DZ_{19}	—	February 17, 2004	Socorro	LINEAR	·	1.4 km	MPC · JPL
399617	2004 DL_{61}	—	February 16, 2004	Kitt Peak	Spacewatch	·	2.2 km	MPC · JPL
399618	2004 DU_{76}	—	February 18, 2004	Socorro	LINEAR	·	1.7 km	MPC · JPL
399619	2004 EG_{76}	—	March 15, 2004	Socorro	LINEAR	·	1.9 km	MPC · JPL
399620	2004 FM_{115}	—	March 23, 2004	Socorro	LINEAR	·	2.5 km	MPC · JPL
399621	2004 GC_{26}	—	April 14, 2004	Kitt Peak	Spacewatch	·	610 m	MPC · JPL
399622	2004 GG_{32}	—	March 27, 2004	Socorro	LINEAR	DOR	2.3 km	MPC · JPL
399623	2004 GJ_{85}	—	April 14, 2004	Kitt Peak	Spacewatch	·	1.8 km	MPC · JPL
399624	2004 HM_{58}	—	April 22, 2004	Kitt Peak	Spacewatch	·	660 m	MPC · JPL
399625	2004 MK_{4}	—	June 22, 2004	Campo Imperatore	CINEOS	H	630 m	MPC · JPL
399626	2004 NX_{6}	—	July 11, 2004	Socorro	LINEAR	·	3.4 km	MPC · JPL
399627	2004 NG_{18}	—	July 14, 2004	Socorro	LINEAR	·	1.8 km	MPC · JPL
399628	2004 NM_{23}	—	July 14, 2004	Socorro	LINEAR	·	690 m	MPC · JPL
399629	2004 NY_{26}	—	July 11, 2004	Socorro	LINEAR	·	1.8 km	MPC · JPL
399630	2004 OH_{3}	—	July 16, 2004	Socorro	LINEAR	·	820 m	MPC · JPL
399631	2004 OH_{15}	—	July 20, 2004	Siding Spring	SSS	·	3.9 km	MPC · JPL
399632	2004 PL_{2}	—	August 8, 2004	Socorro	LINEAR	critical	560 m	MPC · JPL
399633	2004 PZ_{21}	—	August 8, 2004	Socorro	LINEAR	·	2.4 km	MPC · JPL
399634	2004 PS_{31}	—	August 8, 2004	Socorro	LINEAR	·	930 m	MPC · JPL
399635	2004 PY_{46}	—	August 8, 2004	Campo Imperatore	CINEOS	·	820 m	MPC · JPL
399636	2004 PD_{49}	—	August 8, 2004	Palomar	NEAT	·	2.7 km	MPC · JPL
399637	2004 PQ_{68}	—	August 7, 2004	Campo Imperatore	CINEOS	·	760 m	MPC · JPL
399638	2004 PV_{111}	—	August 12, 2004	Campo Imperatore	CINEOS	H	620 m	MPC · JPL
399639	2004 QK_{4}	—	July 13, 2004	Siding Spring	SSS	·	2.0 km	MPC · JPL
399640	2004 QL_{10}	—	August 21, 2004	Siding Spring	SSS	·	700 m	MPC · JPL
399641	2004 QU_{11}	—	August 8, 2004	Socorro	LINEAR	·	730 m	MPC · JPL
399642	2004 QP_{19}	—	August 23, 2004	Siding Spring	SSS	·	3.9 km	MPC · JPL
399643	2004 RC_{3}	—	September 6, 2004	Socorro	LINEAR	·	3.4 km	MPC · JPL
399644	2004 RJ_{16}	—	August 21, 2004	Catalina	CSS	·	830 m	MPC · JPL
399645	2004 RS_{22}	—	September 7, 2004	Kitt Peak	Spacewatch	·	2.1 km	MPC · JPL
399646	2004 RB_{72}	—	September 8, 2004	Socorro	LINEAR	·	770 m	MPC · JPL
399647	2004 RC_{74}	—	August 15, 2004	Campo Imperatore	CINEOS	·	740 m	MPC · JPL
399648	2004 RN_{86}	—	August 8, 2004	Socorro	LINEAR	NYS	850 m	MPC · JPL
399649	2004 RU_{100}	—	September 8, 2004	Socorro	LINEAR	·	920 m	MPC · JPL
399650	2004 RJ_{127}	—	September 7, 2004	Kitt Peak	Spacewatch	·	1.8 km	MPC · JPL
399651	2004 RG_{152}	—	September 10, 2004	Socorro	LINEAR	TIR	3.1 km	MPC · JPL
399652	2004 RW_{153}	—	September 10, 2004	Socorro	LINEAR	·	2.8 km	MPC · JPL
399653	2004 RR_{167}	—	September 7, 2004	Socorro	LINEAR	·	1.8 km	MPC · JPL
399654	2004 RS_{172}	—	September 9, 2004	Kitt Peak	Spacewatch	·	840 m	MPC · JPL
399655	2004 RR_{175}	—	September 10, 2004	Socorro	LINEAR	·	560 m	MPC · JPL
399656	2004 RR_{177}	—	September 10, 2004	Socorro	LINEAR	LIX	3.7 km	MPC · JPL
399657	2004 RJ_{183}	—	August 26, 2004	Catalina	CSS	·	820 m	MPC · JPL
399658	2004 RC_{185}	—	September 10, 2004	Socorro	LINEAR	(2076)	810 m	MPC · JPL
399659	2004 RG_{188}	—	September 10, 2004	Socorro	LINEAR	·	2.6 km	MPC · JPL
399660	2004 RU_{188}	—	September 10, 2004	Socorro	LINEAR	V	690 m	MPC · JPL
399661	2004 RL_{198}	—	September 10, 2004	Socorro	LINEAR	·	1.8 km	MPC · JPL
399662	2004 RB_{205}	—	September 7, 2004	Palomar	NEAT	·	2.0 km	MPC · JPL
399663	2004 RU_{208}	—	September 11, 2004	Socorro	LINEAR	·	4.1 km	MPC · JPL
399664	2004 RC_{236}	—	September 10, 2004	Socorro	LINEAR	·	770 m	MPC · JPL
399665	2004 RQ_{245}	—	September 10, 2004	Kitt Peak	Spacewatch	THM	2.2 km	MPC · JPL
399666	2004 RT_{252}	—	September 14, 2004	Socorro	LINEAR	H	470 m	MPC · JPL
399667	2004 RV_{266}	—	September 11, 2004	Kitt Peak	Spacewatch	·	660 m	MPC · JPL
399668	2004 RH_{336}	—	September 15, 2004	Kitt Peak	Spacewatch	EOS	2.0 km	MPC · JPL
399669	2004 RE_{338}	—	September 15, 2004	Kitt Peak	Spacewatch	·	2.6 km	MPC · JPL
399670	2004 RR_{343}	—	September 14, 2004	Palomar	NEAT	·	3.6 km	MPC · JPL
399671	2004 SW_{3}	—	September 17, 2004	Socorro	LINEAR	·	850 m	MPC · JPL
399672	2004 SF_{5}	—	September 17, 2004	Kitt Peak	Spacewatch	·	700 m	MPC · JPL
399673 Kadenyuk	2004 SW_{19}	Kadenyuk	September 19, 2004	Andrushivka	Andrushivka	EOS	2.6 km	MPC · JPL
399674	2004 SN_{25}	—	September 7, 2004	Kitt Peak	Spacewatch	EOS	2.3 km	MPC · JPL
399675	2004 SO_{38}	—	August 15, 2004	Siding Spring	SSS	·	940 m	MPC · JPL
399676	2004 SN_{42}	—	September 18, 2004	Socorro	LINEAR	·	770 m	MPC · JPL
399677	2004 SN_{44}	—	September 18, 2004	Socorro	LINEAR	·	2.0 km	MPC · JPL
399678	2004 SO_{54}	—	September 22, 2004	Socorro	LINEAR	·	2.9 km	MPC · JPL
399679	2004 TT_{17}	—	October 8, 2004	Kitt Peak	Spacewatch	·	3.2 km	MPC · JPL
399680	2004 TP_{21}	—	October 4, 2004	Apache Point	Apache Point	·	2.3 km	MPC · JPL
399681	2004 TR_{24}	—	October 4, 2004	Kitt Peak	Spacewatch	·	740 m	MPC · JPL
399682	2004 TJ_{43}	—	October 4, 2004	Kitt Peak	Spacewatch	·	1.1 km	MPC · JPL
399683	2004 TU_{48}	—	October 4, 2004	Kitt Peak	Spacewatch	·	980 m	MPC · JPL
399684	2004 TE_{57}	—	October 5, 2004	Kitt Peak	Spacewatch	·	2.4 km	MPC · JPL
399685	2004 TH_{71}	—	October 6, 2004	Kitt Peak	Spacewatch	·	3.0 km	MPC · JPL
399686	2004 TS_{72}	—	October 6, 2004	Kitt Peak	Spacewatch	·	920 m	MPC · JPL
399687	2004 TY_{74}	—	October 6, 2004	Kitt Peak	Spacewatch	·	3.7 km	MPC · JPL
399688	2004 TM_{76}	—	October 7, 2004	Socorro	LINEAR	·	690 m	MPC · JPL
399689	2004 TT_{87}	—	October 5, 2004	Kitt Peak	Spacewatch	·	710 m	MPC · JPL
399690	2004 TN_{98}	—	October 5, 2004	Kitt Peak	Spacewatch	·	2.3 km	MPC · JPL
399691	2004 TT_{98}	—	September 17, 2004	Kitt Peak	Spacewatch	·	2.5 km	MPC · JPL
399692	2004 TW_{101}	—	October 6, 2004	Kitt Peak	Spacewatch	THM	2.7 km	MPC · JPL
399693	2004 TT_{102}	—	October 6, 2004	Palomar	NEAT	·	760 m	MPC · JPL
399694	2004 TL_{118}	—	September 24, 2004	Socorro	LINEAR	EOS	2.1 km	MPC · JPL
399695	2004 TP_{144}	—	October 4, 2004	Kitt Peak	Spacewatch	·	3.5 km	MPC · JPL
399696	2004 TM_{148}	—	October 6, 2004	Kitt Peak	Spacewatch	·	2.3 km	MPC · JPL
399697	2004 TZ_{148}	—	October 6, 2004	Kitt Peak	Spacewatch	·	1.7 km	MPC · JPL
399698	2004 TG_{161}	—	October 6, 2004	Kitt Peak	Spacewatch	·	2.9 km	MPC · JPL
399699	2004 TH_{183}	—	September 10, 2004	Kitt Peak	Spacewatch	·	3.0 km	MPC · JPL
399700	2004 TG_{207}	—	October 7, 2004	Kitt Peak	Spacewatch	·	930 m	MPC · JPL

== 399701–399800 ==
back to top

Designation			Discovery			Properties		Ref
Permanent	Provisional	Named after	Date	Site	Discoverer(s)	Category	Diam.	Ref
399701	2004 TH_{236}	—	October 8, 2004	Kitt Peak	Spacewatch	·	3.1 km	MPC · JPL
399702	2004 TQ_{253}	—	October 9, 2004	Kitt Peak	Spacewatch	·	540 m	MPC · JPL
399703	2004 TQ_{277}	—	October 9, 2004	Kitt Peak	Spacewatch	·	2.5 km	MPC · JPL
399704	2004 TP_{282}	—	September 7, 2004	Kitt Peak	Spacewatch	·	720 m	MPC · JPL
399705	2004 TJ_{300}	—	October 8, 2004	Socorro	LINEAR	EOS	2.6 km	MPC · JPL
399706	2004 TE_{302}	—	October 9, 2004	Anderson Mesa	LONEOS	·	3.9 km	MPC · JPL
399707	2004 TR_{337}	—	October 12, 2004	Kitt Peak	Spacewatch	·	2.4 km	MPC · JPL
399708	2004 TV_{360}	—	October 11, 2004	Kitt Peak	Spacewatch	·	570 m	MPC · JPL
399709	2004 TJ_{367}	—	October 8, 2004	Kitt Peak	Spacewatch	NYS	1.3 km	MPC · JPL
399710	2004 TL_{370}	—	October 7, 2004	Anderson Mesa	LONEOS	·	770 m	MPC · JPL
399711	2004 UH_{7}	—	October 21, 2004	Socorro	LINEAR	·	4.3 km	MPC · JPL
399712	2004 VS_{4}	—	November 3, 2004	Anderson Mesa	LONEOS	·	3.9 km	MPC · JPL
399713	2004 VN_{18}	—	October 13, 2004	Kitt Peak	Spacewatch	·	1.3 km	MPC · JPL
399714	2004 VK_{27}	—	November 5, 2004	Kitt Peak	Spacewatch	·	1.0 km	MPC · JPL
399715	2004 VE_{36}	—	October 10, 2004	Kitt Peak	Spacewatch	·	790 m	MPC · JPL
399716	2004 VY_{50}	—	November 4, 2004	Kitt Peak	Spacewatch	·	870 m	MPC · JPL
399717	2004 VK_{60}	—	October 7, 2004	Kitt Peak	Spacewatch	·	3.3 km	MPC · JPL
399718	2004 VD_{70}	—	November 13, 2004	Great Shefford	Birtwhistle, P.	V	880 m	MPC · JPL
399719	2004 VM_{75}	—	November 3, 2004	Catalina	CSS	H	540 m	MPC · JPL
399720	2004 WU_{4}	—	November 18, 2004	Campo Imperatore	CINEOS	·	2.6 km	MPC · JPL
399721	2004 WY_{7}	—	November 19, 2004	Catalina	CSS	·	1.0 km	MPC · JPL
399722	2004 WH_{8}	—	November 19, 2004	Catalina	CSS	·	2.6 km	MPC · JPL
399723	2004 XH_{7}	—	December 2, 2004	Palomar	NEAT	·	1.3 km	MPC · JPL
399724	2004 XS_{56}	—	December 10, 2004	Kitt Peak	Spacewatch	·	2.7 km	MPC · JPL
399725	2004 XX_{64}	—	December 2, 2004	Socorro	LINEAR	·	2.9 km	MPC · JPL
399726	2004 XL_{83}	—	November 11, 2004	Kitt Peak	Spacewatch	·	3.1 km	MPC · JPL
399727	2004 XA_{109}	—	December 12, 2004	Kitt Peak	Spacewatch	T_{j} (2.98)	4.1 km	MPC · JPL
399728	2004 XT_{124}	—	December 11, 2004	Kitt Peak	Spacewatch	·	2.2 km	MPC · JPL
399729	2004 YH_{20}	—	December 18, 2004	Mount Lemmon	Mount Lemmon Survey	T_{j} (2.98) · EUP	4.9 km	MPC · JPL
399730	2005 AB_{3}	—	January 6, 2005	Catalina	CSS	H	660 m	MPC · JPL
399731	2005 AC_{27}	—	January 6, 2005	Socorro	LINEAR	H	630 m	MPC · JPL
399732	2005 AM_{36}	—	January 13, 2005	Socorro	LINEAR	·	1.5 km	MPC · JPL
399733	2005 BJ_{10}	—	January 16, 2005	Kitt Peak	Spacewatch	·	1.5 km	MPC · JPL
399734	2005 BM_{28}	—	January 31, 2005	Mayhill	Lowe, A.	·	1.2 km	MPC · JPL
399735	2005 DD_{1}	—	February 28, 2005	Socorro	LINEAR	·	1.7 km	MPC · JPL
399736	2005 DA_{2}	—	February 28, 2005	Goodricke-Pigott	R. A. Tucker	EUN	1.6 km	MPC · JPL
399737	2005 EL_{22}	—	March 3, 2005	Catalina	CSS	·	1.5 km	MPC · JPL
399738	2005 EH_{166}	—	March 4, 2005	Kitt Peak	Spacewatch	·	1.2 km	MPC · JPL
399739	2005 EV_{187}	—	March 10, 2005	Mount Lemmon	Mount Lemmon Survey	EUN	1.5 km	MPC · JPL
399740	2005 EM_{211}	—	February 9, 2005	Kitt Peak	Spacewatch	EUN	1.2 km	MPC · JPL
399741	2005 EB_{227}	—	March 9, 2005	Mount Lemmon	Mount Lemmon Survey	·	1.3 km	MPC · JPL
399742	2005 EV_{227}	—	March 9, 2005	Socorro	LINEAR	·	1.5 km	MPC · JPL
399743	2005 ET_{241}	—	March 2, 2005	Catalina	CSS	·	1.3 km	MPC · JPL
399744	2005 EJ_{325}	—	March 8, 2005	Mount Lemmon	Mount Lemmon Survey	·	1.2 km	MPC · JPL
399745 Ouchaou	2005 GW_{9}	Ouchaou	April 3, 2005	Vicques	M. Ory	·	2.0 km	MPC · JPL
399746	2005 GM_{30}	—	March 10, 2005	Mount Lemmon	Mount Lemmon Survey	·	2.3 km	MPC · JPL
399747	2005 GN_{48}	—	April 5, 2005	Mount Lemmon	Mount Lemmon Survey	·	1.4 km	MPC · JPL
399748	2005 GH_{74}	—	April 5, 2005	Anderson Mesa	LONEOS	·	1.8 km	MPC · JPL
399749	2005 GG_{132}	—	April 10, 2005	Kitt Peak	Spacewatch	·	1.4 km	MPC · JPL
399750	2005 GX_{133}	—	April 10, 2005	Kitt Peak	Spacewatch	·	1.2 km	MPC · JPL
399751	2005 GR_{148}	—	April 11, 2005	Kitt Peak	Spacewatch	·	1.4 km	MPC · JPL
399752	2005 GH_{193}	—	April 10, 2005	Kitt Peak	M. W. Buie	·	870 m	MPC · JPL
399753	2005 GM_{220}	—	April 5, 2005	Anderson Mesa	LONEOS	·	1.5 km	MPC · JPL
399754	2005 HH_{2}	—	April 17, 2005	Kitt Peak	Spacewatch	·	1.6 km	MPC · JPL
399755	2005 JD_{8}	—	May 4, 2005	Mauna Kea	Veillet, C.	·	1.4 km	MPC · JPL
399756	2005 JH_{21}	—	May 4, 2005	Siding Spring	SSS	JUN	1.3 km	MPC · JPL
399757	2005 JE_{55}	—	May 4, 2005	Kitt Peak	Spacewatch	EUN	1.1 km	MPC · JPL
399758	2005 JO_{91}	—	May 9, 2005	Siding Spring	SSS	·	1.8 km	MPC · JPL
399759	2005 JH_{99}	—	May 9, 2005	Kitt Peak	Spacewatch	·	1.4 km	MPC · JPL
399760	2005 JK_{106}	—	May 11, 2005	Catalina	CSS	·	1.5 km	MPC · JPL
399761	2005 JW_{117}	—	May 10, 2005	Kitt Peak	Spacewatch	·	1.8 km	MPC · JPL
399762	2005 JZ_{142}	—	May 15, 2005	Palomar	NEAT	·	1.5 km	MPC · JPL
399763	2005 JS_{157}	—	May 4, 2005	Palomar	NEAT	·	1.8 km	MPC · JPL
399764	2005 JS_{167}	—	May 12, 2005	Campo Imperatore	CINEOS	·	1.1 km	MPC · JPL
399765	2005 JL_{175}	—	May 1, 2005	Kitt Peak	Spacewatch	EUN	1.3 km	MPC · JPL
399766	2005 LF_{18}	—	June 6, 2005	Kitt Peak	Spacewatch	EUN	1.0 km	MPC · JPL
399767	2005 MT_{4}	—	June 17, 2005	Mount Lemmon	Mount Lemmon Survey	JUN	1.7 km	MPC · JPL
399768	2005 ML_{5}	—	June 24, 2005	Palomar	NEAT	JUN	1.1 km	MPC · JPL
399769	2005 MA_{9}	—	June 28, 2005	Kitt Peak	Spacewatch	·	2.6 km	MPC · JPL
399770	2005 MU_{27}	—	June 29, 2005	Kitt Peak	Spacewatch	·	2.4 km	MPC · JPL
399771	2005 ML_{50}	—	June 30, 2005	Kitt Peak	Spacewatch	AGN	1.3 km	MPC · JPL
399772	2005 ME_{54}	—	June 27, 2005	Palomar	NEAT	·	2.2 km	MPC · JPL
399773	2005 NV_{4}	—	July 3, 2005	Mount Lemmon	Mount Lemmon Survey	·	1.5 km	MPC · JPL
399774	2005 NB_{7}	—	July 5, 2005	Catalina	CSS	APO · PHA · moon	620 m	MPC · JPL
399775	2005 NS_{8}	—	July 1, 2005	Kitt Peak	Spacewatch	·	2.0 km	MPC · JPL
399776	2005 NM_{26}	—	July 5, 2005	Mount Lemmon	Mount Lemmon Survey	·	1.9 km	MPC · JPL
399777	2005 NZ_{28}	—	July 5, 2005	Palomar	NEAT	·	2.1 km	MPC · JPL
399778	2005 NL_{32}	—	July 5, 2005	Kitt Peak	Spacewatch	·	2.8 km	MPC · JPL
399779	2005 NM_{33}	—	July 5, 2005	Kitt Peak	Spacewatch	·	1.8 km	MPC · JPL
399780	2005 NJ_{34}	—	July 5, 2005	Kitt Peak	Spacewatch	·	2.3 km	MPC · JPL
399781	2005 ND_{47}	—	July 7, 2005	Kitt Peak	Spacewatch	JUN	950 m	MPC · JPL
399782	2005 NZ_{54}	—	July 10, 2005	Kitt Peak	Spacewatch	·	2.0 km	MPC · JPL
399783	2005 NO_{55}	—	July 9, 2005	Reedy Creek	J. Broughton	·	2.6 km	MPC · JPL
399784	2005 NG_{60}	—	July 9, 2005	Kitt Peak	Spacewatch	·	2.0 km	MPC · JPL
399785	2005 NM_{63}	—	July 5, 2005	Siding Spring	R. H. McNaught	·	1.8 km	MPC · JPL
399786	2005 OT_{8}	—	July 29, 2005	Palomar	NEAT	·	1.7 km	MPC · JPL
399787	2005 OZ_{16}	—	July 30, 2005	Palomar	NEAT	·	2.8 km	MPC · JPL
399788	2005 OE_{23}	—	July 30, 2005	Palomar	NEAT	·	2.0 km	MPC · JPL
399789	2005 PK_{7}	—	August 1, 2005	Siding Spring	SSS	·	1.8 km	MPC · JPL
399790	2005 PE_{10}	—	August 4, 2005	Palomar	NEAT	·	1.8 km	MPC · JPL
399791	2005 QJ_{41}	—	August 26, 2005	Anderson Mesa	LONEOS	·	2.5 km	MPC · JPL
399792	2005 QE_{50}	—	August 26, 2005	Palomar	NEAT	·	3.2 km	MPC · JPL
399793	2005 QK_{71}	—	August 29, 2005	Socorro	LINEAR	·	2.5 km	MPC · JPL
399794	2005 QG_{78}	—	August 25, 2005	Palomar	NEAT	·	2.6 km	MPC · JPL
399795	2005 QY_{91}	—	August 26, 2005	Anderson Mesa	LONEOS	·	3.2 km	MPC · JPL
399796	2005 QV_{107}	—	August 27, 2005	Palomar	NEAT	HOF	2.3 km	MPC · JPL
399797	2005 QJ_{110}	—	August 27, 2005	Palomar	NEAT	KOR	1.3 km	MPC · JPL
399798	2005 QS_{130}	—	August 28, 2005	Kitt Peak	Spacewatch	EOS	2.0 km	MPC · JPL
399799	2005 QV_{177}	—	August 31, 2005	Palomar	NEAT	·	2.2 km	MPC · JPL
399800	2005 RQ_{4}	—	September 5, 2005	Catalina	CSS	·	2.3 km	MPC · JPL

== 399801–399900 ==
back to top

Designation			Discovery			Properties		Ref
Permanent	Provisional	Named after	Date	Site	Discoverer(s)	Category	Diam.	Ref
399801	2005 RH_{45}	—	September 14, 2005	Catalina	CSS	·	2.8 km	MPC · JPL
399802	2005 RJ_{45}	—	September 14, 2005	Catalina	CSS	·	2.5 km	MPC · JPL
399803	2005 SZ_{3}	—	September 24, 2005	Kitt Peak	Spacewatch	KOR	1.2 km	MPC · JPL
399804	2005 SR_{12}	—	September 23, 2005	Catalina	CSS	·	2.8 km	MPC · JPL
399805	2005 SG_{48}	—	September 24, 2005	Kitt Peak	Spacewatch	·	1.9 km	MPC · JPL
399806	2005 SC_{54}	—	September 25, 2005	Kitt Peak	Spacewatch	·	1.9 km	MPC · JPL
399807	2005 SM_{74}	—	September 24, 2005	Kitt Peak	Spacewatch	·	620 m	MPC · JPL
399808	2005 ST_{78}	—	September 24, 2005	Kitt Peak	Spacewatch	·	1.7 km	MPC · JPL
399809	2005 SN_{79}	—	September 24, 2005	Kitt Peak	Spacewatch	·	1.8 km	MPC · JPL
399810	2005 SY_{81}	—	September 14, 2005	Kitt Peak	Spacewatch	·	2.9 km	MPC · JPL
399811	2005 SZ_{86}	—	September 24, 2005	Kitt Peak	Spacewatch	·	2.4 km	MPC · JPL
399812	2005 SB_{108}	—	September 26, 2005	Kitt Peak	Spacewatch	·	700 m	MPC · JPL
399813	2005 ST_{118}	—	August 31, 2005	Anderson Mesa	LONEOS	·	2.2 km	MPC · JPL
399814	2005 SE_{133}	—	September 29, 2005	Kitt Peak	Spacewatch	·	850 m	MPC · JPL
399815	2005 SF_{170}	—	September 29, 2005	Anderson Mesa	LONEOS	·	2.4 km	MPC · JPL
399816	2005 SN_{180}	—	September 29, 2005	Mount Lemmon	Mount Lemmon Survey	·	2.0 km	MPC · JPL
399817	2005 SF_{202}	—	September 30, 2005	Palomar	NEAT	EOS	2.2 km	MPC · JPL
399818	2005 SR_{204}	—	September 30, 2005	Palomar	NEAT	·	2.3 km	MPC · JPL
399819	2005 SW_{253}	—	September 22, 2005	Palomar	NEAT	(32418)	2.1 km	MPC · JPL
399820	2005 SV_{275}	—	September 29, 2005	Kitt Peak	Spacewatch	·	840 m	MPC · JPL
399821	2005 ST_{278}	—	September 30, 2005	Catalina	CSS	·	2.3 km	MPC · JPL
399822	2005 SV_{288}	—	September 27, 2005	Apache Point	A. C. Becker	·	2.5 km	MPC · JPL
399823	2005 SR_{292}	—	September 30, 2005	Mount Lemmon	Mount Lemmon Survey	·	2.5 km	MPC · JPL
399824	2005 TR_{7}	—	October 1, 2005	Kitt Peak	Spacewatch	·	2.2 km	MPC · JPL
399825	2005 TJ_{8}	—	October 1, 2005	Kitt Peak	Spacewatch	·	2.1 km	MPC · JPL
399826	2005 TN_{34}	—	October 1, 2005	Kitt Peak	Spacewatch	EOS	1.8 km	MPC · JPL
399827	2005 TV_{83}	—	October 3, 2005	Kitt Peak	Spacewatch	·	1.9 km	MPC · JPL
399828	2005 TE_{94}	—	October 6, 2005	Kitt Peak	Spacewatch	·	2.4 km	MPC · JPL
399829	2005 TN_{96}	—	October 6, 2005	Mount Lemmon	Mount Lemmon Survey	·	1.6 km	MPC · JPL
399830	2005 TV_{106}	—	October 4, 2005	Mount Lemmon	Mount Lemmon Survey	·	1.7 km	MPC · JPL
399831	2005 TF_{120}	—	October 7, 2005	Kitt Peak	Spacewatch	·	2.1 km	MPC · JPL
399832	2005 TD_{126}	—	October 7, 2005	Kitt Peak	Spacewatch	·	2.2 km	MPC · JPL
399833	2005 TP_{141}	—	October 8, 2005	Kitt Peak	Spacewatch	·	690 m	MPC · JPL
399834	2005 TB_{143}	—	October 8, 2005	Kitt Peak	Spacewatch	EOS	1.6 km	MPC · JPL
399835	2005 TM_{161}	—	October 9, 2005	Kitt Peak	Spacewatch	·	1.8 km	MPC · JPL
399836	2005 TU_{165}	—	October 9, 2005	Kitt Peak	Spacewatch	·	600 m	MPC · JPL
399837	2005 UT_{8}	—	August 31, 2005	Campo Imperatore	CINEOS	·	2.1 km	MPC · JPL
399838	2005 UO_{14}	—	October 22, 2005	Kitt Peak	Spacewatch	·	1.9 km	MPC · JPL
399839	2005 UT_{29}	—	October 23, 2005	Catalina	CSS	EUP	4.9 km	MPC · JPL
399840	2005 UZ_{32}	—	October 24, 2005	Kitt Peak	Spacewatch	EOS	2.0 km	MPC · JPL
399841	2005 UK_{71}	—	September 30, 2005	Catalina	CSS	·	2.0 km	MPC · JPL
399842	2005 UT_{82}	—	October 22, 2005	Kitt Peak	Spacewatch	KOR	1.2 km	MPC · JPL
399843	2005 UG_{85}	—	October 22, 2005	Kitt Peak	Spacewatch	·	2.1 km	MPC · JPL
399844	2005 UD_{93}	—	October 22, 2005	Kitt Peak	Spacewatch	·	960 m	MPC · JPL
399845	2005 UW_{100}	—	October 22, 2005	Kitt Peak	Spacewatch	·	750 m	MPC · JPL
399846	2005 UL_{114}	—	October 22, 2005	Catalina	CSS	·	5.0 km	MPC · JPL
399847	2005 UV_{121}	—	October 24, 2005	Kitt Peak	Spacewatch	·	1.8 km	MPC · JPL
399848	2005 UH_{127}	—	October 24, 2005	Kitt Peak	Spacewatch	EOS	2.3 km	MPC · JPL
399849	2005 UB_{142}	—	October 25, 2005	Catalina	CSS	DOR	2.8 km	MPC · JPL
399850	2005 UW_{168}	—	October 24, 2005	Kitt Peak	Spacewatch	·	550 m	MPC · JPL
399851	2005 UD_{175}	—	October 24, 2005	Kitt Peak	Spacewatch	VER	2.9 km	MPC · JPL
399852	2005 UL_{183}	—	October 25, 2005	Kitt Peak	Spacewatch	·	750 m	MPC · JPL
399853	2005 UA_{269}	—	October 1, 2005	Kitt Peak	Spacewatch	·	2.9 km	MPC · JPL
399854	2005 UJ_{269}	—	October 1, 2005	Mount Lemmon	Mount Lemmon Survey	·	630 m	MPC · JPL
399855	2005 UQ_{287}	—	October 26, 2005	Kitt Peak	Spacewatch	·	980 m	MPC · JPL
399856	2005 UC_{289}	—	October 26, 2005	Kitt Peak	Spacewatch	·	800 m	MPC · JPL
399857	2005 UZ_{292}	—	October 26, 2005	Kitt Peak	Spacewatch	·	2.1 km	MPC · JPL
399858	2005 UC_{294}	—	October 26, 2005	Kitt Peak	Spacewatch	·	2.2 km	MPC · JPL
399859	2005 UY_{300}	—	October 26, 2005	Kitt Peak	Spacewatch	·	2.1 km	MPC · JPL
399860	2005 UO_{325}	—	October 12, 2005	Kitt Peak	Spacewatch	·	1.8 km	MPC · JPL
399861	2005 UB_{363}	—	October 27, 2005	Mount Lemmon	Mount Lemmon Survey	·	2.0 km	MPC · JPL
399862	2005 UZ_{385}	—	October 29, 2005	Mount Lemmon	Mount Lemmon Survey	VER	2.5 km	MPC · JPL
399863	2005 UL_{397}	—	October 28, 2005	Socorro	LINEAR	·	2.4 km	MPC · JPL
399864	2005 UH_{413}	—	October 31, 2005	Mount Lemmon	Mount Lemmon Survey	·	2.0 km	MPC · JPL
399865	2005 UV_{413}	—	March 26, 2003	Kitt Peak	Spacewatch	·	2.9 km	MPC · JPL
399866	2005 UR_{424}	—	October 28, 2005	Kitt Peak	Spacewatch	·	730 m	MPC · JPL
399867	2005 UA_{426}	—	October 28, 2005	Kitt Peak	Spacewatch	·	2.4 km	MPC · JPL
399868	2005 UG_{428}	—	October 28, 2005	Kitt Peak	Spacewatch	·	3.9 km	MPC · JPL
399869	2005 UQ_{463}	—	October 30, 2005	Kitt Peak	Spacewatch	EOS	1.9 km	MPC · JPL
399870	2005 UN_{498}	—	October 7, 2005	Catalina	CSS	·	2.0 km	MPC · JPL
399871	2005 UZ_{499}	—	October 5, 2005	Catalina	CSS	·	2.2 km	MPC · JPL
399872	2005 UL_{501}	—	October 27, 2005	Catalina	CSS	·	3.3 km	MPC · JPL
399873	2005 UL_{520}	—	October 26, 2005	Apache Point	A. C. Becker	·	2.4 km	MPC · JPL
399874	2005 VH_{28}	—	November 4, 2005	Socorro	LINEAR	·	2.6 km	MPC · JPL
399875	2005 VM_{43}	—	September 30, 2005	Mount Lemmon	Mount Lemmon Survey	·	3.8 km	MPC · JPL
399876	2005 VC_{46}	—	November 4, 2005	Kitt Peak	Spacewatch	·	1.9 km	MPC · JPL
399877	2005 VD_{102}	—	November 1, 2005	Anderson Mesa	LONEOS	·	3.7 km	MPC · JPL
399878	2005 VV_{106}	—	November 5, 2005	Kitt Peak	Spacewatch	EOS	2.1 km	MPC · JPL
399879	2005 VD_{108}	—	November 6, 2005	Kitt Peak	Spacewatch	·	830 m	MPC · JPL
399880	2005 VT_{115}	—	November 11, 2005	Kitt Peak	Spacewatch	·	790 m	MPC · JPL
399881	2005 VY_{133}	—	November 1, 2005	Apache Point	A. C. Becker	·	3.4 km	MPC · JPL
399882	2005 WR_{4}	—	November 20, 2005	Catalina	CSS	·	3.9 km	MPC · JPL
399883	2005 WJ_{18}	—	November 22, 2005	Kitt Peak	Spacewatch	·	2.9 km	MPC · JPL
399884	2005 WN_{21}	—	November 21, 2005	Kitt Peak	Spacewatch	VER	4.2 km	MPC · JPL
399885	2005 WY_{21}	—	November 12, 2005	Kitt Peak	Spacewatch	·	2.1 km	MPC · JPL
399886	2005 WK_{24}	—	November 21, 2005	Kitt Peak	Spacewatch	·	3.6 km	MPC · JPL
399887	2005 WB_{38}	—	November 22, 2005	Kitt Peak	Spacewatch	·	2.9 km	MPC · JPL
399888	2005 WQ_{40}	—	November 25, 2005	Mount Lemmon	Mount Lemmon Survey	·	1.0 km	MPC · JPL
399889	2005 WR_{48}	—	November 25, 2005	Kitt Peak	Spacewatch	EOS	2.4 km	MPC · JPL
399890	2005 WN_{51}	—	November 25, 2005	Kitt Peak	Spacewatch	EOS	2.3 km	MPC · JPL
399891	2005 WX_{55}	—	November 28, 2005	Socorro	LINEAR	·	950 m	MPC · JPL
399892	2005 WS_{75}	—	November 25, 2005	Kitt Peak	Spacewatch	·	2.6 km	MPC · JPL
399893	2005 WB_{78}	—	November 25, 2005	Kitt Peak	Spacewatch	·	2.1 km	MPC · JPL
399894	2005 WA_{83}	—	November 4, 2005	Kitt Peak	Spacewatch	·	2.2 km	MPC · JPL
399895	2005 WH_{86}	—	November 28, 2005	Mount Lemmon	Mount Lemmon Survey	V	580 m	MPC · JPL
399896	2005 WH_{103}	—	November 3, 2005	Catalina	CSS	·	2.3 km	MPC · JPL
399897	2005 WL_{136}	—	November 26, 2005	Mount Lemmon	Mount Lemmon Survey	·	810 m	MPC · JPL
399898	2005 WA_{141}	—	November 26, 2005	Mount Lemmon	Mount Lemmon Survey	·	3.4 km	MPC · JPL
399899	2005 WH_{147}	—	November 25, 2005	Catalina	CSS	EOS	2.3 km	MPC · JPL
399900	2005 WV_{152}	—	November 6, 2005	Mount Lemmon	Mount Lemmon Survey	·	2.9 km	MPC · JPL

== 399901–400000 ==
back to top

Designation			Discovery			Properties		Ref
Permanent	Provisional	Named after	Date	Site	Discoverer(s)	Category	Diam.	Ref
399901	2005 WT_{162}	—	November 28, 2005	Mount Lemmon	Mount Lemmon Survey	HYG	3.0 km	MPC · JPL
399902	2005 WP_{182}	—	November 26, 2005	Socorro	LINEAR	·	4.5 km	MPC · JPL
399903	2005 WH_{185}	—	November 29, 2005	Mount Lemmon	Mount Lemmon Survey	H	700 m	MPC · JPL
399904	2005 WH_{202}	—	November 30, 2005	Mount Lemmon	Mount Lemmon Survey	·	3.0 km	MPC · JPL
399905	2005 XA_{1}	—	December 4, 2005	Mayhill	Lowe, A.	·	990 m	MPC · JPL
399906	2005 XR_{5}	—	December 1, 2005	Socorro	LINEAR	·	810 m	MPC · JPL
399907	2005 XY_{24}	—	October 7, 2005	Kitt Peak	Spacewatch	LUT	6.1 km	MPC · JPL
399908	2005 XL_{25}	—	December 4, 2005	Socorro	LINEAR	·	2.4 km	MPC · JPL
399909	2005 XR_{32}	—	December 4, 2005	Kitt Peak	Spacewatch	·	3.3 km	MPC · JPL
399910	2005 XL_{37}	—	December 4, 2005	Kitt Peak	Spacewatch	·	990 m	MPC · JPL
399911	2005 XU_{62}	—	December 5, 2005	Mount Lemmon	Mount Lemmon Survey	·	3.8 km	MPC · JPL
399912	2005 XG_{75}	—	December 6, 2005	Kitt Peak	Spacewatch	·	4.5 km	MPC · JPL
399913	2005 XA_{76}	—	December 7, 2005	Kitt Peak	Spacewatch	·	880 m	MPC · JPL
399914	2005 XP_{82}	—	December 10, 2005	Kitt Peak	Spacewatch	·	3.2 km	MPC · JPL
399915	2005 YB_{2}	—	November 24, 2000	Kitt Peak	Spacewatch	·	3.4 km	MPC · JPL
399916	2005 YW_{7}	—	December 22, 2005	Catalina	CSS	PHO	1.4 km	MPC · JPL
399917	2005 YX_{14}	—	December 22, 2005	Kitt Peak	Spacewatch	·	3.7 km	MPC · JPL
399918	2005 YL_{16}	—	December 22, 2005	Kitt Peak	Spacewatch	EUP	5.2 km	MPC · JPL
399919	2005 YT_{27}	—	December 22, 2005	Kitt Peak	Spacewatch	·	1.2 km	MPC · JPL
399920	2005 YJ_{38}	—	December 2, 2005	Catalina	CSS	T_{j} (2.91)	6.4 km	MPC · JPL
399921	2005 YN_{47}	—	December 26, 2005	Kitt Peak	Spacewatch	·	2.1 km	MPC · JPL
399922	2005 YE_{60}	—	December 22, 2005	Kitt Peak	Spacewatch	·	610 m	MPC · JPL
399923	2005 YU_{75}	—	December 24, 2005	Kitt Peak	Spacewatch	EOS	2.7 km	MPC · JPL
399924	2005 YO_{77}	—	December 24, 2005	Kitt Peak	Spacewatch	·	3.3 km	MPC · JPL
399925	2005 YR_{87}	—	December 25, 2005	Mount Lemmon	Mount Lemmon Survey	·	1.2 km	MPC · JPL
399926	2005 YJ_{110}	—	December 25, 2005	Kitt Peak	Spacewatch	·	4.0 km	MPC · JPL
399927	2005 YP_{131}	—	December 25, 2005	Mount Lemmon	Mount Lemmon Survey	NYS	920 m	MPC · JPL
399928	2005 YU_{131}	—	December 5, 2005	Mount Lemmon	Mount Lemmon Survey	·	4.0 km	MPC · JPL
399929	2005 YW_{141}	—	December 28, 2005	Mount Lemmon	Mount Lemmon Survey	·	2.9 km	MPC · JPL
399930	2005 YQ_{144}	—	December 28, 2005	Mount Lemmon	Mount Lemmon Survey	·	2.4 km	MPC · JPL
399931	2005 YU_{161}	—	December 27, 2005	Kitt Peak	Spacewatch	·	630 m	MPC · JPL
399932	2005 YA_{168}	—	December 28, 2005	Kitt Peak	Spacewatch	·	3.9 km	MPC · JPL
399933	2005 YP_{177}	—	December 25, 2005	Kitt Peak	Spacewatch	·	4.4 km	MPC · JPL
399934	2005 YY_{178}	—	December 25, 2005	Mount Lemmon	Mount Lemmon Survey	·	3.4 km	MPC · JPL
399935	2005 YG_{189}	—	December 29, 2005	Kitt Peak	Spacewatch	NYS	1.0 km	MPC · JPL
399936	2005 YU_{202}	—	October 28, 2005	Mount Lemmon	Mount Lemmon Survey	·	1.5 km	MPC · JPL
399937	2005 YD_{251}	—	December 28, 2005	Kitt Peak	Spacewatch	·	2.3 km	MPC · JPL
399938	2005 YL_{253}	—	December 29, 2005	Kitt Peak	Spacewatch	·	2.7 km	MPC · JPL
399939	2005 YR_{270}	—	December 27, 2005	Mount Lemmon	Mount Lemmon Survey	PHO	1.1 km	MPC · JPL
399940	2005 YH_{272}	—	December 29, 2005	Kitt Peak	Spacewatch	·	2.7 km	MPC · JPL
399941	2005 YG_{275}	—	October 30, 2005	Mount Lemmon	Mount Lemmon Survey	·	2.3 km	MPC · JPL
399942	2005 YZ_{278}	—	December 25, 2005	Mount Lemmon	Mount Lemmon Survey	BRA	1.8 km	MPC · JPL
399943	2006 AP_{12}	—	January 4, 2006	Kitt Peak	Spacewatch	VER	3.0 km	MPC · JPL
399944	2006 AS_{16}	—	January 5, 2006	Socorro	LINEAR	·	3.6 km	MPC · JPL
399945	2006 AS_{23}	—	January 4, 2006	Kitt Peak	Spacewatch	·	720 m	MPC · JPL
399946	2006 AT_{25}	—	December 28, 2005	Mount Lemmon	Mount Lemmon Survey	·	2.0 km	MPC · JPL
399947	2006 AT_{34}	—	January 4, 2006	Kitt Peak	Spacewatch	·	3.3 km	MPC · JPL
399948	2006 AD_{36}	—	January 4, 2006	Kitt Peak	Spacewatch	NYS	1.3 km	MPC · JPL
399949	2006 AM_{39}	—	December 2, 2005	Mount Lemmon	Mount Lemmon Survey	EOS	2.1 km	MPC · JPL
399950	2006 AA_{43}	—	January 6, 2006	Kitt Peak	Spacewatch	·	1.0 km	MPC · JPL
399951	2006 AB_{46}	—	December 2, 2005	Mount Lemmon	Mount Lemmon Survey	·	4.3 km	MPC · JPL
399952	2006 AR_{58}	—	December 26, 2005	Kitt Peak	Spacewatch	·	1.0 km	MPC · JPL
399953	2006 AT_{69}	—	January 6, 2006	Kitt Peak	Spacewatch	·	680 m	MPC · JPL
399954	2006 AT_{78}	—	January 4, 2006	Kitt Peak	Spacewatch	NYS	1.1 km	MPC · JPL
399955	2006 AU_{94}	—	January 8, 2006	Kitt Peak	Spacewatch	VER	3.0 km	MPC · JPL
399956	2006 AZ_{95}	—	December 27, 2005	Mount Lemmon	Mount Lemmon Survey	·	1.4 km	MPC · JPL
399957	2006 AQ_{104}	—	January 5, 2006	Kitt Peak	Spacewatch	V	580 m	MPC · JPL
399958	2006 BR_{4}	—	January 21, 2006	Kitt Peak	Spacewatch	·	870 m	MPC · JPL
399959	2006 BK_{21}	—	January 22, 2006	Mount Lemmon	Mount Lemmon Survey	·	2.6 km	MPC · JPL
399960	2006 BZ_{35}	—	January 23, 2006	Kitt Peak	Spacewatch	·	2.2 km	MPC · JPL
399961	2006 BR_{47}	—	December 6, 2005	Kitt Peak	Spacewatch	·	2.8 km	MPC · JPL
399962	2006 BZ_{52}	—	January 25, 2006	Kitt Peak	Spacewatch	·	1.2 km	MPC · JPL
399963	2006 BG_{63}	—	January 22, 2006	Catalina	CSS	EOS	2.8 km	MPC · JPL
399964	2006 BW_{70}	—	January 23, 2006	Kitt Peak	Spacewatch	·	2.7 km	MPC · JPL
399965	2006 BD_{81}	—	January 23, 2006	Kitt Peak	Spacewatch	EOS	2.3 km	MPC · JPL
399966	2006 BZ_{81}	—	January 23, 2006	Kitt Peak	Spacewatch	V	680 m	MPC · JPL
399967	2006 BJ_{89}	—	January 7, 2006	Mount Lemmon	Mount Lemmon Survey	VER	3.3 km	MPC · JPL
399968	2006 BT_{94}	—	January 26, 2006	Kitt Peak	Spacewatch	NYS	1.1 km	MPC · JPL
399969	2006 BV_{107}	—	January 25, 2006	Kitt Peak	Spacewatch	·	3.0 km	MPC · JPL
399970	2006 BS_{116}	—	January 26, 2006	Kitt Peak	Spacewatch	MAS	640 m	MPC · JPL
399971	2006 BU_{121}	—	January 26, 2006	Mount Lemmon	Mount Lemmon Survey	·	1.1 km	MPC · JPL
399972	2006 BN_{124}	—	January 26, 2006	Kitt Peak	Spacewatch	·	950 m	MPC · JPL
399973	2006 BU_{130}	—	January 26, 2006	Kitt Peak	Spacewatch	·	980 m	MPC · JPL
399974	2006 BS_{151}	—	January 25, 2006	Kitt Peak	Spacewatch	·	5.3 km	MPC · JPL
399975	2006 BO_{158}	—	January 25, 2006	Kitt Peak	Spacewatch	MAS	780 m	MPC · JPL
399976	2006 BM_{174}	—	January 27, 2006	Kitt Peak	Spacewatch	·	910 m	MPC · JPL
399977	2006 BA_{180}	—	January 27, 2006	Mount Lemmon	Mount Lemmon Survey	·	1.3 km	MPC · JPL
399978	2006 BG_{180}	—	January 27, 2006	Mount Lemmon	Mount Lemmon Survey	MAS	760 m	MPC · JPL
399979 Lewseaman	2006 BS_{198}	Lewseaman	January 30, 2006	Catalina	CSS	PHO	1.1 km	MPC · JPL
399980	2006 BC_{213}	—	January 30, 2006	Bergisch Gladbach	W. Bickel	NYS	1.4 km	MPC · JPL
399981	2006 BC_{233}	—	January 31, 2006	Kitt Peak	Spacewatch	·	1.0 km	MPC · JPL
399982	2006 BW_{235}	—	January 23, 2006	Kitt Peak	Spacewatch	CYB	3.7 km	MPC · JPL
399983	2006 BP_{237}	—	December 5, 2005	Mount Lemmon	Mount Lemmon Survey	·	1.3 km	MPC · JPL
399984	2006 BU_{263}	—	January 31, 2006	Kitt Peak	Spacewatch	CYB	3.8 km	MPC · JPL
399985	2006 BW_{265}	—	January 31, 2006	Kitt Peak	Spacewatch	·	1.1 km	MPC · JPL
399986	2006 BY_{276}	—	January 26, 2006	Mount Lemmon	Mount Lemmon Survey	·	4.4 km	MPC · JPL
399987	2006 BE_{278}	—	January 26, 2006	Kitt Peak	Spacewatch	·	1.3 km	MPC · JPL
399988	2006 CK_{13}	—	January 21, 2006	Mount Lemmon	Mount Lemmon Survey	·	3.4 km	MPC · JPL
399989	2006 CN_{27}	—	February 2, 2006	Kitt Peak	Spacewatch	·	1.0 km	MPC · JPL
399990	2006 CJ_{35}	—	February 2, 2006	Mount Lemmon	Mount Lemmon Survey	·	1.3 km	MPC · JPL
399991	2006 CY_{50}	—	February 4, 2006	Kitt Peak	Spacewatch	MAS	620 m	MPC · JPL
399992	2006 DG_{12}	—	January 31, 2006	Kitt Peak	Spacewatch	·	3.4 km	MPC · JPL
399993	2006 DV_{14}	—	February 23, 2006	Mount Lemmon	Mount Lemmon Survey	·	5.1 km	MPC · JPL
399994	2006 DB_{15}	—	February 20, 2006	Kitt Peak	Spacewatch	MAS	690 m	MPC · JPL
399995	2006 DE_{22}	—	February 2, 2006	Mount Lemmon	Mount Lemmon Survey	·	870 m	MPC · JPL
399996	2006 DS_{35}	—	February 20, 2006	Kitt Peak	Spacewatch	·	1.2 km	MPC · JPL
399997	2006 DA_{45}	—	February 20, 2006	Kitt Peak	Spacewatch	NYS	1.1 km	MPC · JPL
399998	2006 DP_{142}	—	February 25, 2006	Kitt Peak	Spacewatch	·	1.1 km	MPC · JPL
399999	2006 DG_{161}	—	February 27, 2006	Kitt Peak	Spacewatch	V	660 m	MPC · JPL
400000	2006 DK_{190}	—	February 27, 2006	Kitt Peak	Spacewatch	MAS	670 m	MPC · JPL

back to top

== See also ==
- Meanings of minor-planet names: 399001–400000
