= Meanings of minor-planet names: 399001–400000 =

As minor planet discoveries are confirmed, they are given a permanent number by the IAU's Minor Planet Center (MPC), and the discoverers can then submit names for them, following the IAU's naming conventions. The list below concerns those minor planets in the specified number-range that have received names, and explains the meanings of those names.

Official naming citations of newly named small Solar System bodies are approved and published in a bulletin by IAU's Working Group for Small Bodies Nomenclature (WGSBN). Before May 2021, citations were published in MPC's Minor Planet Circulars for many decades. Recent citations can also be found on the JPL Small-Body Database (SBDB). Until his death in 2016, German astronomer Lutz D. Schmadel compiled these citations into the Dictionary of Minor Planet Names (DMP) and regularly updated the collection.

Based on Paul Herget's The Names of the Minor Planets, Schmadel also researched the unclear origin of numerous asteroids, most of which had been named prior to World War II. This article incorporates text from this source, which is in the public domain: SBDB New namings may only be added to this list below after official publication as the preannouncement of names is condemned. The WGSBN publishes a comprehensive guideline for the naming rules of non-cometary small Solar System bodies.

== 399001–399100 ==
Named minor planet	Provisional	This minor planet was named for...	Ref · Catalog
There are no named minor planets in this number range

== 399101–399200 ==
back to top

Named minor planet	Provisional	This minor planet was named for...	Ref · Catalog
There are no named minor planets in this number range

== 399201–399300 ==
back to top

Named minor planet	Provisional	This minor planet was named for...	Ref · Catalog
There are no named minor planets in this number range

== 399301–399400 ==
back to top

Named minor planet	Provisional	This minor planet was named for...	Ref · Catalog
There are no named minor planets in this number range

== 399401–399500 ==
back to top

Named minor planet	Provisional	This minor planet was named for...	Ref · Catalog
399411 Ayiomamitis	2001 TV_{257}	Anthony Ayiomamitis (b. 1957) is a Greek computer scientist. He is also an amateur astronomer and a well-published astrophotographer covering a broad range from deep sky to landscapes. He is best known for his eye-catching analemma photographs showing the annual motion of the Sun above the ruins of ancient Greece.	IAU · 399411
399442 Radicofani	2002 CB_{1}	Radicofani is a medieval Italian village located in the foothills of Mount Amiata in Tuscany. It is also home to the Astronomical Observatory of Monte Calcinaio.	IAU · 399442

== 399501–399600 ==
back to top

Named minor planet	Provisional	This minor planet was named for...	Ref · Catalog
399565 Dévényanna	2003 SZ_{128}	Anna Dévény (1935–2017) was a Hungarian physiotherapist and gymnastics trainer. She developed a unique treatment system, which helps to restore the muscle function, and abnormal body positions of babies. The method has helped thousands of children recover in recent decades.	IAU · 399565

== 399601–399700 ==
back to top

Named minor planet	Provisional	This minor planet was named for...	Ref · Catalog
399673 Kadenyuk	2004 SW_{19}	Leonid Kadeniuk (1951–2018) was a Ukrainian astronaut. He made his only spaceflight as Payload Specialist on NASA's STS-87 Columbia mission in 1997.	JPL · 399673

== 399701–399800 ==
back to top

Named minor planet	Provisional	This minor planet was named for...	Ref · Catalog
399745 Ouchaou	2005 GW_{9}	Omar Ouchaou (born 1968), the caretaker of the Oukaïmeden Observatory (J43), in Oukaïmeden of Morocco's Atlas Mountains	JPL · 399745

== 399801–399900 ==
back to top

Named minor planet	Provisional	This minor planet was named for...	Ref · Catalog
There are no named minor planets in this number range

== 399901–400000 ==
back to top

Named minor planet	Provisional	This minor planet was named for...	Ref · Catalog
399979 Lewseaman	2006 BS_{198}	Lewis T. Seaman (born 1923), an engineer for many years at GE Aerospace.	JPL · 399979

back to top

Preceded by 398,001–399,000	Meanings of minor-planet names List of minor planets: 399,001–400,000	Succeeded by 400,001–401,000
