= List of named minor planets: 700000–799999 =

This is a partial list of named minor planets in numerical order. It contains a total of 139 entries as of 9 November 2026. Minor planets for which no article exist are displayed in grey color and redirect to the list of minor planets (see List of minor planets § Main index).

== From 700,000 to 799,999 ==
- 700094 Anunciação
- 700818 Pauldelaney
- 701424 Piotrguzik
- 701781 Dougjohnstone
- 702686 Zehr
- 702688 Federicocolombo
- 702961 Tamineilson
- 703111 Leejungpin
- 703756 Xijiaouni
- 706348 Montcabrer
- 706882 Hertageßner
- 707242 Denniscrabtree
- 707520 Tongji
- 708341 Fredjudson
- 708658 Turowicz
- 708722 Timișoara
- 709193 Concettafinardi
- 709844 Kmoniecki
- 710231 Jávorkaágoston
- 711327 Ovidiuignat
- 711527 Tudor
- 711599 Kane
- 711824 Infante
- 712499 Alexstefanescu
- 713133 Taiping
- 713428 Mirosławdziergas
- 714305 Panceri
- 714378 Char
- 715542 Tafforin
- 716260 Baybayan
- 718490 Marcelosouza
- 718492 Quro
- 718629 Wangzhenru
- 718863 Zhouwenjie
- 719612 Hoshizaki
- 719840 Bilsemdüzce
- 719987 Zhonghe
- 720549 Cırık
- 721153 Gunda
- 721154 Heinz
- 722063 Andrasz
- 723217 Levesque
- 723218 Binsted
- 724427 Sorinhotea
- 724547 Süßenberger
- 724666 Unda-Sanzana
- 724875 Hengchun
- 724932 Pozniakas
- 726023 Berényróbert
- 727524 Pierrepaquette
- 727736 Fus
- 728826 Szerbantal
- 729034 Yinqiang
- 729512 Braga
- 730495 Costafrancini
- 730891 Patrickdowler
- 731124 Rosvick
- 731389 Jensdierks
- 731678 Philippschäfer
- 731716 Käszlaci
- 731815 Stefanberg
- 732272 Langejans
- 732472 Grahamhill
- 732571 Jipa
- 733086 Virgiliupop
- 732821 Raycarlberg
- 733173 Mārīteeglīte
- 734551 Monin
- 735177 Dinev
- 737028 Steinbring
- 738926 Nitschelm
- 739634 Zhaojingyuan
- 740495 Langill
- 741306 Marshallmccall
- 741444 Abbasi
- 741647 Davidge
- 741718 Simard
- 741821 Lewisknee
- 743062 Dianabeșliu
- 743878 Shandaren
- 745254 Friedhelm
- 745492 Saanich
- 747532 Davidabrown
- 748569 Bernhardhäusler
- 750032 Jinca
- 750594 Cîrstea
- 751385 Zachwatowicz
- 752263 Franciscosánchez
- 752403 Bayurisanto
- 754258 Anghel
- 755002 Richer
- 755509 Juming
- 755922 Kinmen
- 756509 Zoltandeak
- 756832 Balogh
- 757109 Donaldmoffatt
- 761081 Sandraeglīte
- 761083 Micloș
- 763488 Oniciuc
- 763533 Alabiano
- 765015 Marčiulionis
- 767321 Inceu
- 767327 Diamandi
- 767828 Conovici
- 768325 Geyagugv
- 768693 Șuran
- 769288 Varadinagypal
- 769584 Pteancu
- 770175 Flueras
- 771739 Joseph
- 771914 Dawsoncharles
- 773258 Corpodean
- 773906 Larisaromanova
- 776645 Michaelkarrer
- 776675 Jędrzejewicz
- 777018 Huangchunming
- 779957 Dolea
- 780137 Gatterer
- 780857 Rodés
- 781753 Scurtu
- 782609 Becheș
- 782948 Ursache
- 783129 Danescu
- 783560 Beldea
- 783839 Vasilechirila
- 783963 Verkkoniemi
- 785630 Peterbrandt
- 785648 Likho
- 788153 Trabia
- 788501 Gabi
- 788573 Isaiah
- 788764 Alexandrumironov
- 788890 Garafía
- 790358 Jānisstreičs
- 790726 Șerbu
- 792121 Boldea
- 792972 Teresina
- 798118 Todoque
- 798737 Faustina
- 798772 Ledóchowska
back to top

== See also ==
- List of minor planet discoverers
- List of observatory codes
- Meanings of minor planet names § Index
