= List of minor planets: 718001–719000 =

The following is a partial list of minor planets, running from minor-planet number 718001 through 719000, inclusive. The primary data for this and other partial lists is based on JPL's "Small-Body Orbital Elements" and data available from the Minor Planet Center. Critical list information is also provided by the MPC, unless otherwise specified from Lowell Observatory. A detailed description of the table's columns and additional sources are given on the main page including a complete list of every page in this series, and a statistical break-up on the dynamical classification of minor planets.

Also see the summary list of all named bodies in numerical and alphabetical order, and the corresponding naming citations for the number range of this particular list. New namings may only be added to this list after official publication, as the preannouncement of names is condemned by the Working Group for Small Bodies Nomenclature of the International Astronomical Union.

Near-Earth obj.	MBA (inner)	MBA (outer)	Centaur
Mars-crosser	MBA (middle)	Jupiter trojan	Trans-Neptunian obj.
Unclassified

== 718001–718100 ==
Designation			Discovery			Properties		Ref
Permanent	Provisional	Named after	Date	Site	Discoverer(s)	Category	Diam.	Ref
718001	2017 CJ_{19}	—	February 15, 2012	Haleakala	Pan-STARRS 1	·	1.3 km	MPC · JPL
718002	2017 CM_{19}	—	January 9, 2006	Kitt Peak	Spacewatch	·	2.9 km	MPC · JPL
718003	2017 CF_{20}	—	March 19, 2013	Haleakala	Pan-STARRS 1	·	1.5 km	MPC · JPL
718004	2017 CF_{21}	—	February 16, 2012	Haleakala	Pan-STARRS 1	·	1.9 km	MPC · JPL
718005	2017 CL_{21}	—	January 28, 2017	Haleakala	Pan-STARRS 1	L5	7.7 km	MPC · JPL
718006	2017 CJ_{22}	—	July 25, 2014	Haleakala	Pan-STARRS 1	EOS	1.1 km	MPC · JPL
718007	2017 CL_{22}	—	January 11, 2008	Kitt Peak	Spacewatch	·	1.9 km	MPC · JPL
718008	2017 CN_{24}	—	January 16, 2011	Mount Lemmon	Mount Lemmon Survey	·	2.6 km	MPC · JPL
718009	2017 CQ_{24}	—	August 22, 2014	Haleakala	Pan-STARRS 1	·	2.8 km	MPC · JPL
718010	2017 CT_{24}	—	July 28, 2015	Haleakala	Pan-STARRS 1	·	740 m	MPC · JPL
718011	2017 CX_{24}	—	July 25, 2014	Haleakala	Pan-STARRS 1	·	2.4 km	MPC · JPL
718012	2017 CM_{26}	—	July 29, 2008	Mount Lemmon	Mount Lemmon Survey	·	2.0 km	MPC · JPL
718013	2017 CT_{26}	—	March 13, 2012	Haleakala	Pan-STARRS 1	·	2.0 km	MPC · JPL
718014	2017 CF_{29}	—	March 12, 2013	Kitt Peak	Spacewatch	·	1.3 km	MPC · JPL
718015	2017 CS_{29}	—	February 10, 2008	Kitt Peak	Spacewatch	·	1.9 km	MPC · JPL
718016	2017 CU_{29}	—	February 3, 2017	Haleakala	Pan-STARRS 1	VER	2.2 km	MPC · JPL
718017	2017 CU_{33}	—	October 13, 1998	Kitt Peak	Spacewatch	·	1.3 km	MPC · JPL
718018	2017 CV_{33}	—	December 26, 2005	Kitt Peak	Spacewatch	·	2.6 km	MPC · JPL
718019	2017 CW_{33}	—	January 29, 2000	Kitt Peak	Spacewatch	·	1.1 km	MPC · JPL
718020	2017 CX_{36}	—	February 2, 2017	Haleakala	Pan-STARRS 1	URS	3.0 km	MPC · JPL
718021	2017 CR_{39}	—	February 4, 2017	Haleakala	Pan-STARRS 1	·	1.8 km	MPC · JPL
718022	2017 CL_{41}	—	February 2, 2017	Haleakala	Pan-STARRS 1	·	2.2 km	MPC · JPL
718023	2017 CH_{47}	—	February 2, 2017	Haleakala	Pan-STARRS 1	·	1.9 km	MPC · JPL
718024	2017 CF_{48}	—	February 4, 2017	Mount Lemmon	Mount Lemmon Survey	EOS	1.5 km	MPC · JPL
718025	2017 CP_{51}	—	February 3, 2017	Mount Lemmon	Mount Lemmon Survey	·	1.2 km	MPC · JPL
718026	2017 CX_{51}	—	February 4, 2017	Haleakala	Pan-STARRS 1	·	2.0 km	MPC · JPL
718027	2017 DP	—	February 18, 2008	Mount Lemmon	Mount Lemmon Survey	·	1.7 km	MPC · JPL
718028	2017 DJ_{1}	—	January 2, 2012	Kitt Peak	Spacewatch	BRA	1.3 km	MPC · JPL
718029	2017 DS_{1}	—	August 28, 2014	Kitt Peak	Spacewatch	·	2.5 km	MPC · JPL
718030	2017 DW_{1}	—	August 15, 2004	Cerro Tololo	Deep Ecliptic Survey	·	2.2 km	MPC · JPL
718031	2017 DE_{3}	—	August 16, 2009	Kitt Peak	Spacewatch	·	2.3 km	MPC · JPL
718032	2017 DF_{4}	—	December 30, 2007	Kitt Peak	Spacewatch	·	1.9 km	MPC · JPL
718033	2017 DH_{5}	—	November 21, 2006	Mount Lemmon	Mount Lemmon Survey	·	1.6 km	MPC · JPL
718034	2017 DW_{5}	—	September 23, 2015	Haleakala	Pan-STARRS 1	·	2.6 km	MPC · JPL
718035	2017 DC_{6}	—	December 1, 2005	Mount Lemmon	Mount Lemmon Survey	EOS	1.8 km	MPC · JPL
718036	2017 DJ_{7}	—	January 27, 2006	Mount Lemmon	Mount Lemmon Survey	·	2.2 km	MPC · JPL
718037	2017 DO_{8}	—	November 22, 2009	Mount Lemmon	Mount Lemmon Survey	·	2.9 km	MPC · JPL
718038	2017 DP_{10}	—	August 3, 2014	Haleakala	Pan-STARRS 1	·	2.0 km	MPC · JPL
718039	2017 DT_{10}	—	July 25, 2006	Mount Lemmon	Mount Lemmon Survey	·	1.6 km	MPC · JPL
718040	2017 DV_{11}	—	January 29, 2000	Kitt Peak	Spacewatch	·	2.8 km	MPC · JPL
718041	2017 DX_{11}	—	December 4, 2010	Mount Lemmon	Mount Lemmon Survey	·	3.2 km	MPC · JPL
718042	2017 DJ_{12}	—	April 12, 2012	Mayhill-ISON	L. Elenin	·	2.8 km	MPC · JPL
718043	2017 DV_{12}	—	June 29, 2014	Haleakala	Pan-STARRS 1	·	1.8 km	MPC · JPL
718044	2017 DM_{13}	—	February 9, 2013	Oukaïmeden	C. Rinner	·	1.8 km	MPC · JPL
718045	2017 DY_{14}	—	January 31, 2017	Haleakala	Pan-STARRS 1	LIX	2.9 km	MPC · JPL
718046	2017 DK_{16}	—	December 25, 2016	Haleakala	Pan-STARRS 1	·	2.6 km	MPC · JPL
718047	2017 DV_{16}	—	August 21, 2015	Haleakala	Pan-STARRS 1	EOS	1.5 km	MPC · JPL
718048	2017 DC_{17}	—	February 10, 2008	Mount Lemmon	Mount Lemmon Survey	AGN	950 m	MPC · JPL
718049	2017 DF_{17}	—	January 2, 2017	Haleakala	Pan-STARRS 1	·	1.7 km	MPC · JPL
718050	2017 DH_{17}	—	November 20, 2015	Mount Lemmon	Mount Lemmon Survey	·	2.7 km	MPC · JPL
718051	2017 DM_{17}	—	June 29, 2015	Haleakala	Pan-STARRS 1	·	930 m	MPC · JPL
718052	2017 DQ_{17}	—	October 12, 2015	Mount Lemmon	Mount Lemmon Survey	·	1.6 km	MPC · JPL
718053	2017 DG_{18}	—	January 27, 2017	Mount Lemmon	Mount Lemmon Survey	EOS	1.5 km	MPC · JPL
718054	2017 DY_{20}	—	January 27, 2017	Haleakala	Pan-STARRS 1	·	1.6 km	MPC · JPL
718055	2017 DH_{21}	—	January 27, 2017	Haleakala	Pan-STARRS 1	·	1.3 km	MPC · JPL
718056	2017 DE_{22}	—	April 14, 2010	Kitt Peak	Spacewatch	MAS	690 m	MPC · JPL
718057	2017 DH_{22}	—	August 16, 2002	Kitt Peak	Spacewatch	·	2.9 km	MPC · JPL
718058	2017 DW_{22}	—	February 12, 2004	Kitt Peak	Spacewatch	HNS	890 m	MPC · JPL
718059	2017 DH_{24}	—	October 20, 2007	Kitt Peak	Spacewatch	·	890 m	MPC · JPL
718060	2017 DX_{24}	—	July 19, 2013	Haleakala	Pan-STARRS 1	·	2.4 km	MPC · JPL
718061	2017 DY_{24}	—	February 23, 2012	Mount Lemmon	Mount Lemmon Survey	·	1.6 km	MPC · JPL
718062	2017 DD_{26}	—	September 18, 2003	Kitt Peak	Spacewatch	·	2.6 km	MPC · JPL
718063	2017 DK_{26}	—	January 30, 2006	Kitt Peak	Spacewatch	·	2.2 km	MPC · JPL
718064	2017 DC_{27}	—	May 28, 2014	Mount Lemmon	Mount Lemmon Survey	·	1.0 km	MPC · JPL
718065	2017 DK_{27}	—	February 23, 2007	Mount Lemmon	Mount Lemmon Survey	·	1.3 km	MPC · JPL
718066	2017 DR_{27}	—	March 3, 2009	Mount Lemmon	Mount Lemmon Survey	·	990 m	MPC · JPL
718067	2017 DD_{29}	—	August 26, 2012	Haleakala	Pan-STARRS 1	·	540 m	MPC · JPL
718068	2017 DK_{29}	—	November 18, 2011	Mount Lemmon	Mount Lemmon Survey	·	1.2 km	MPC · JPL
718069	2017 DK_{31}	—	February 28, 2012	Haleakala	Pan-STARRS 1	EOS	2.1 km	MPC · JPL
718070	2017 DN_{32}	—	July 16, 2004	Cerro Tololo	Deep Ecliptic Survey	·	1.2 km	MPC · JPL
718071	2017 DP_{32}	—	August 27, 2009	Kitt Peak	Spacewatch	EOS	1.8 km	MPC · JPL
718072	2017 DY_{32}	—	July 14, 2013	Haleakala	Pan-STARRS 1	·	3.3 km	MPC · JPL
718073	2017 DL_{38}	—	July 4, 2014	Haleakala	Pan-STARRS 1	GEF	1.1 km	MPC · JPL
718074	2017 DV_{38}	—	July 25, 2014	Haleakala	Pan-STARRS 1	EOS	1.6 km	MPC · JPL
718075	2017 DX_{38}	—	August 17, 2009	Kitt Peak	Spacewatch	EOS	1.5 km	MPC · JPL
718076	2017 DJ_{40}	—	December 2, 2010	Mount Lemmon	Mount Lemmon Survey	·	1.4 km	MPC · JPL
718077	2017 DO_{40}	—	March 13, 2013	Mount Lemmon	Mount Lemmon Survey	·	1.2 km	MPC · JPL
718078	2017 DK_{42}	—	August 28, 2014	Haleakala	Pan-STARRS 1	·	2.4 km	MPC · JPL
718079	2017 DS_{42}	—	June 27, 2014	Haleakala	Pan-STARRS 1	·	2.3 km	MPC · JPL
718080	2017 DE_{43}	—	July 31, 2014	Haleakala	Pan-STARRS 1	·	2.4 km	MPC · JPL
718081	2017 DF_{43}	—	January 29, 2011	Mount Lemmon	Mount Lemmon Survey	·	2.3 km	MPC · JPL
718082	2017 DH_{43}	—	August 27, 2009	Kitt Peak	Spacewatch	·	2.1 km	MPC · JPL
718083	2017 DA_{44}	—	March 30, 2012	Kitt Peak	Spacewatch	·	2.5 km	MPC · JPL
718084	2017 DP_{44}	—	October 9, 2007	Mount Lemmon	Mount Lemmon Survey	·	920 m	MPC · JPL
718085	2017 DZ_{44}	—	January 19, 2012	Mount Lemmon	Mount Lemmon Survey	·	2.4 km	MPC · JPL
718086	2017 DD_{45}	—	November 16, 2006	Catalina	CSS	·	2.1 km	MPC · JPL
718087	2017 DX_{45}	—	April 25, 2007	Mount Lemmon	Mount Lemmon Survey	·	2.6 km	MPC · JPL
718088	2017 DJ_{46}	—	September 8, 2010	Kitt Peak	Spacewatch	·	1.9 km	MPC · JPL
718089	2017 DU_{46}	—	January 12, 2011	Mount Lemmon	Mount Lemmon Survey	·	2.5 km	MPC · JPL
718090	2017 DW_{52}	—	October 31, 2010	Mount Lemmon	Mount Lemmon Survey	EOS	1.4 km	MPC · JPL
718091	2017 DT_{53}	—	August 3, 2014	Haleakala	Pan-STARRS 1	·	1.4 km	MPC · JPL
718092	2017 DE_{54}	—	September 1, 2014	Mount Lemmon	Mount Lemmon Survey	·	1.3 km	MPC · JPL
718093	2017 DR_{54}	—	March 22, 2012	Mount Lemmon	Mount Lemmon Survey	·	2.1 km	MPC · JPL
718094	2017 DT_{54}	—	August 25, 2012	Mount Lemmon	Mount Lemmon Survey	·	590 m	MPC · JPL
718095	2017 DT_{56}	—	November 7, 2005	Mauna Kea	A. Boattini	·	2.8 km	MPC · JPL
718096	2017 DU_{56}	—	December 1, 2006	Mount Lemmon	Mount Lemmon Survey	·	2.1 km	MPC · JPL
718097	2017 DB_{57}	—	September 23, 2015	Haleakala	Pan-STARRS 1	·	2.4 km	MPC · JPL
718098	2017 DC_{58}	—	February 20, 2012	Haleakala	Pan-STARRS 1	EOS	1.6 km	MPC · JPL
718099	2017 DG_{58}	—	March 24, 2012	Kitt Peak	Spacewatch	·	2.2 km	MPC · JPL
718100	2017 DX_{58}	—	May 14, 2012	Haleakala	Pan-STARRS 1	URS	3.0 km	MPC · JPL

== 718101–718200 ==
back to top

Designation			Discovery			Properties		Ref
Permanent	Provisional	Named after	Date	Site	Discoverer(s)	Category	Diam.	Ref
718101	2017 DA_{59}	—	April 21, 2013	Mount Lemmon	Mount Lemmon Survey	·	1.3 km	MPC · JPL
718102	2017 DW_{59}	—	January 4, 2011	Mount Lemmon	Mount Lemmon Survey	·	2.0 km	MPC · JPL
718103	2017 DM_{60}	—	August 3, 2014	Haleakala	Pan-STARRS 1	·	2.9 km	MPC · JPL
718104	2017 DY_{60}	—	January 7, 2006	Mount Lemmon	Mount Lemmon Survey	EOS	2.0 km	MPC · JPL
718105	2017 DD_{61}	—	September 3, 2014	Catalina	CSS	·	2.4 km	MPC · JPL
718106	2017 DP_{63}	—	April 6, 2013	Haleakala	Pan-STARRS 1	MAR	970 m	MPC · JPL
718107	2017 DR_{64}	—	March 16, 2012	Mount Lemmon	Mount Lemmon Survey	·	1.7 km	MPC · JPL
718108	2017 DZ_{64}	—	October 18, 2015	Haleakala	Pan-STARRS 1	·	2.2 km	MPC · JPL
718109	2017 DO_{65}	—	January 2, 2011	Mount Lemmon	Mount Lemmon Survey	·	2.4 km	MPC · JPL
718110	2017 DM_{66}	—	July 28, 2014	Haleakala	Pan-STARRS 1	·	1.5 km	MPC · JPL
718111	2017 DN_{66}	—	January 14, 2011	Mount Lemmon	Mount Lemmon Survey	·	2.1 km	MPC · JPL
718112	2017 DV_{66}	—	November 2, 2011	Kitt Peak	Spacewatch	·	1.4 km	MPC · JPL
718113	2017 DG_{67}	—	March 15, 2012	Mount Lemmon	Mount Lemmon Survey	TEL	1.2 km	MPC · JPL
718114	2017 DM_{68}	—	October 22, 2003	Kitt Peak	Spacewatch	·	2.2 km	MPC · JPL
718115	2017 DY_{68}	—	August 30, 2014	Mount Lemmon	Mount Lemmon Survey	·	2.4 km	MPC · JPL
718116	2017 DO_{71}	—	March 3, 2000	Socorro	LINEAR	·	2.7 km	MPC · JPL
718117	2017 DT_{71}	—	March 2, 2006	Kitt Peak	Spacewatch	·	2.4 km	MPC · JPL
718118	2017 DX_{72}	—	April 1, 2003	Apache Point	SDSS Collaboration	BRA	1.4 km	MPC · JPL
718119	2017 DJ_{73}	—	March 29, 2000	Socorro	LINEAR	·	1.3 km	MPC · JPL
718120	2017 DW_{73}	—	February 8, 2011	Mount Lemmon	Mount Lemmon Survey	VER	2.4 km	MPC · JPL
718121	2017 DD_{74}	—	September 20, 2008	Mount Lemmon	Mount Lemmon Survey	·	2.6 km	MPC · JPL
718122	2017 DK_{75}	—	December 10, 2005	Kitt Peak	Spacewatch	·	1.9 km	MPC · JPL
718123	2017 DN_{75}	—	August 23, 2007	Kitt Peak	Spacewatch	·	2.9 km	MPC · JPL
718124	2017 DY_{75}	—	September 29, 2009	Mount Lemmon	Mount Lemmon Survey	NAE	2.6 km	MPC · JPL
718125	2017 DS_{76}	—	August 27, 2014	Haleakala	Pan-STARRS 1	·	3.0 km	MPC · JPL
718126	2017 DA_{79}	—	July 5, 2003	Kitt Peak	Spacewatch	·	2.4 km	MPC · JPL
718127	2017 DM_{79}	—	January 19, 2013	Mount Lemmon	Mount Lemmon Survey	MAR	1.0 km	MPC · JPL
718128	2017 DV_{79}	—	September 9, 2015	Haleakala	Pan-STARRS 1	T_{j} (2.98)	3.2 km	MPC · JPL
718129	2017 DE_{82}	—	February 28, 2006	Mount Lemmon	Mount Lemmon Survey	·	2.6 km	MPC · JPL
718130	2017 DP_{82}	—	June 9, 2007	Kitt Peak	Spacewatch	·	2.1 km	MPC · JPL
718131	2017 DC_{84}	—	April 24, 2007	Mount Lemmon	Mount Lemmon Survey	·	2.3 km	MPC · JPL
718132	2017 DO_{84}	—	March 28, 2012	Haleakala	Pan-STARRS 1	·	2.5 km	MPC · JPL
718133	2017 DL_{85}	—	January 20, 2017	Haleakala	Pan-STARRS 1	·	2.8 km	MPC · JPL
718134	2017 DL_{86}	—	November 20, 2009	Mount Lemmon	Mount Lemmon Survey	·	3.5 km	MPC · JPL
718135	2017 DN_{86}	—	February 2, 2017	Kitt Peak	Spacewatch	·	1.8 km	MPC · JPL
718136	2017 DP_{86}	—	March 29, 2012	Haleakala	Pan-STARRS 1	·	2.1 km	MPC · JPL
718137	2017 DQ_{86}	—	January 15, 2015	Haleakala	Pan-STARRS 1	L5	7.6 km	MPC · JPL
718138	2017 DF_{87}	—	March 23, 2012	Siding Spring	SSS	EUP	4.6 km	MPC · JPL
718139	2017 DY_{87}	—	March 10, 2008	Mount Lemmon	Mount Lemmon Survey	·	1.5 km	MPC · JPL
718140	2017 DH_{89}	—	July 1, 2014	Haleakala	Pan-STARRS 1	·	2.9 km	MPC · JPL
718141	2017 DR_{89}	—	October 16, 2015	Kitt Peak	Spacewatch	·	1.4 km	MPC · JPL
718142	2017 DC_{91}	—	November 20, 2009	Mount Lemmon	Mount Lemmon Survey	·	2.7 km	MPC · JPL
718143	2017 DU_{92}	—	February 3, 2000	Kitt Peak	Spacewatch	·	2.7 km	MPC · JPL
718144	2017 DO_{93}	—	February 13, 2008	Mount Lemmon	Mount Lemmon Survey	·	1.3 km	MPC · JPL
718145	2017 DX_{93}	—	January 26, 2017	Haleakala	Pan-STARRS 1	·	2.2 km	MPC · JPL
718146	2017 DJ_{94}	—	February 11, 2011	Mount Lemmon	Mount Lemmon Survey	·	2.4 km	MPC · JPL
718147	2017 DH_{95}	—	May 23, 2014	Haleakala	Pan-STARRS 1	·	660 m	MPC · JPL
718148	2017 DP_{96}	—	April 7, 2003	Kitt Peak	Spacewatch	·	600 m	MPC · JPL
718149	2017 DY_{96}	—	September 5, 2008	Kitt Peak	Spacewatch	·	2.6 km	MPC · JPL
718150	2017 DL_{97}	—	January 29, 2011	Mount Lemmon	Mount Lemmon Survey	·	2.2 km	MPC · JPL
718151	2017 DX_{97}	—	May 2, 2008	Kitt Peak	Spacewatch	BRA	1.2 km	MPC · JPL
718152	2017 DA_{98}	—	December 21, 2006	Mount Lemmon	Mount Lemmon Survey	·	480 m	MPC · JPL
718153	2017 DS_{98}	—	July 15, 2013	Haleakala	Pan-STARRS 1	·	2.7 km	MPC · JPL
718154	2017 DJ_{99}	—	January 30, 2011	Mount Lemmon	Mount Lemmon Survey	·	2.9 km	MPC · JPL
718155	2017 DM_{99}	—	December 10, 2005	Kitt Peak	Spacewatch	·	2.8 km	MPC · JPL
718156	2017 DB_{101}	—	January 5, 2006	Mount Lemmon	Mount Lemmon Survey	·	2.0 km	MPC · JPL
718157	2017 DF_{101}	—	December 1, 2005	Kitt Peak	L. H. Wasserman, R. L. Millis	EOS	1.6 km	MPC · JPL
718158	2017 DN_{101}	—	February 8, 2008	Catalina	CSS	ADE	2.0 km	MPC · JPL
718159	2017 DO_{101}	—	October 8, 2015	Haleakala	Pan-STARRS 1	·	1.9 km	MPC · JPL
718160	2017 DQ_{102}	—	February 12, 2008	Kitt Peak	Spacewatch	·	1.5 km	MPC · JPL
718161	2017 DS_{102}	—	September 26, 2009	Kitt Peak	Spacewatch	EOS	1.5 km	MPC · JPL
718162	2017 DF_{103}	—	September 20, 2003	Kitt Peak	Spacewatch	·	2.7 km	MPC · JPL
718163	2017 DF_{104}	—	November 8, 2010	Mount Lemmon	Mount Lemmon Survey	·	2.2 km	MPC · JPL
718164	2017 DV_{104}	—	October 24, 2005	Mauna Kea	A. Boattini	·	2.7 km	MPC · JPL
718165	2017 DE_{105}	—	January 16, 2011	Mount Lemmon	Mount Lemmon Survey	VER	2.4 km	MPC · JPL
718166	2017 DN_{105}	—	November 3, 2011	Mount Lemmon	Mount Lemmon Survey	·	1.3 km	MPC · JPL
718167	2017 DZ_{105}	—	September 22, 2009	Kitt Peak	Spacewatch	EOS	2.4 km	MPC · JPL
718168	2017 DB_{106}	—	February 10, 2008	Kitt Peak	Spacewatch	·	1.7 km	MPC · JPL
718169	2017 DP_{107}	—	December 5, 2010	Mount Lemmon	Mount Lemmon Survey	·	2.9 km	MPC · JPL
718170	2017 DB_{108}	—	February 27, 2009	Mount Lemmon	Mount Lemmon Survey	H	570 m	MPC · JPL
718171	2017 DE_{108}	—	April 22, 2012	Mount Lemmon	Mount Lemmon Survey	·	2.8 km	MPC · JPL
718172	2017 DD_{110}	—	January 8, 2000	Kitt Peak	Spacewatch	·	3.0 km	MPC · JPL
718173	2017 DH_{112}	—	November 6, 2010	Kitt Peak	Spacewatch	·	2.4 km	MPC · JPL
718174	2017 DZ_{112}	—	December 15, 2006	Kitt Peak	Spacewatch	·	1.6 km	MPC · JPL
718175	2017 DK_{113}	—	December 18, 1999	Kitt Peak	Spacewatch	·	1.4 km	MPC · JPL
718176	2017 DQ_{113}	—	March 29, 2012	Haleakala	Pan-STARRS 1	·	2.5 km	MPC · JPL
718177	2017 DR_{114}	—	January 30, 2012	Mount Lemmon	Mount Lemmon Survey	·	2.9 km	MPC · JPL
718178	2017 DZ_{114}	—	January 28, 2006	Mount Lemmon	Mount Lemmon Survey	·	2.3 km	MPC · JPL
718179	2017 DM_{115}	—	November 11, 2001	Kitt Peak	Spacewatch	·	1.6 km	MPC · JPL
718180	2017 DO_{115}	—	January 17, 2007	Kitt Peak	Spacewatch	·	1.7 km	MPC · JPL
718181	2017 DW_{115}	—	February 27, 2017	Oukaïmeden	M. Ory	·	2.8 km	MPC · JPL
718182	2017 DW_{116}	—	November 1, 2015	Mount Lemmon	Mount Lemmon Survey	·	3.1 km	MPC · JPL
718183	2017 DF_{117}	—	April 21, 2004	Socorro	LINEAR	JUN	900 m	MPC · JPL
718184	2017 DQ_{117}	—	March 11, 2013	Siding Spring	SSS	·	1.5 km	MPC · JPL
718185	2017 DR_{117}	—	November 20, 2015	Mount Lemmon	Mount Lemmon Survey	·	2.4 km	MPC · JPL
718186	2017 DT_{117}	—	July 12, 2013	Haleakala	Pan-STARRS 1	·	2.7 km	MPC · JPL
718187	2017 DU_{117}	—	January 2, 2011	Mount Lemmon	Mount Lemmon Survey	·	2.6 km	MPC · JPL
718188	2017 DA_{118}	—	January 2, 2017	Haleakala	Pan-STARRS 1	·	2.0 km	MPC · JPL
718189	2017 DR_{118}	—	December 3, 2015	Mount Lemmon	Mount Lemmon Survey	·	2.5 km	MPC · JPL
718190	2017 DW_{118}	—	April 22, 2007	Mount Lemmon	Mount Lemmon Survey	·	2.0 km	MPC · JPL
718191	2017 DL_{119}	—	January 26, 2012	Mount Lemmon	Mount Lemmon Survey	GEF	1.0 km	MPC · JPL
718192	2017 DD_{121}	—	December 10, 2010	Mount Lemmon	Mount Lemmon Survey	·	1.7 km	MPC · JPL
718193	2017 DJ_{121}	—	February 7, 2011	Mount Lemmon	Mount Lemmon Survey	·	1.9 km	MPC · JPL
718194	2017 DF_{122}	—	January 13, 2011	Kitt Peak	Spacewatch	THM	1.9 km	MPC · JPL
718195	2017 DB_{123}	—	April 27, 2012	Haleakala	Pan-STARRS 1	·	2.5 km	MPC · JPL
718196	2017 DQ_{124}	—	September 9, 2013	Haleakala	Pan-STARRS 1	T_{j} (2.96)	3.1 km	MPC · JPL
718197	2017 DN_{128}	—	August 22, 2003	Palomar	NEAT	EOS	1.6 km	MPC · JPL
718198	2017 DG_{130}	—	November 17, 2014	Haleakala	Pan-STARRS 1	·	2.2 km	MPC · JPL
718199	2017 DH_{130}	—	February 21, 2017	Haleakala	Pan-STARRS 1	·	1.3 km	MPC · JPL
718200	2017 DK_{130}	—	February 22, 2017	Haleakala	Pan-STARRS 1	·	1.9 km	MPC · JPL

== 718201–718300 ==
back to top

Designation			Discovery			Properties		Ref
Permanent	Provisional	Named after	Date	Site	Discoverer(s)	Category	Diam.	Ref
718201	2017 DL_{130}	—	February 21, 2017	Haleakala	Pan-STARRS 1	·	1.0 km	MPC · JPL
718202	2017 DM_{130}	—	February 22, 2017	Mount Lemmon	Mount Lemmon Survey	EOS	1.4 km	MPC · JPL
718203	2017 DZ_{130}	—	February 24, 2017	Haleakala	Pan-STARRS 1	·	510 m	MPC · JPL
718204	2017 DS_{132}	—	February 25, 2017	Haleakala	Pan-STARRS 1	·	2.5 km	MPC · JPL
718205	2017 DC_{134}	—	February 22, 2017	Mount Lemmon	Mount Lemmon Survey	·	1.8 km	MPC · JPL
718206	2017 DY_{141}	—	February 21, 2017	Haleakala	Pan-STARRS 1	·	1.8 km	MPC · JPL
718207	2017 DK_{144}	—	May 8, 2013	Haleakala	Pan-STARRS 1	·	1.2 km	MPC · JPL
718208	2017 DV_{144}	—	February 24, 2017	Mount Lemmon	Mount Lemmon Survey	3:2	4.3 km	MPC · JPL
718209	2017 DW_{144}	—	February 22, 2017	Mount Lemmon	Mount Lemmon Survey	EOS	1.4 km	MPC · JPL
718210	2017 DT_{147}	—	February 26, 2017	ESA OGS	ESA OGS	URS	2.5 km	MPC · JPL
718211	2017 DW_{152}	—	February 5, 2011	Mount Lemmon	Mount Lemmon Survey	THB	2.2 km	MPC · JPL
718212	2017 DA_{155}	—	February 23, 2017	Mount Lemmon	Mount Lemmon Survey	·	1.4 km	MPC · JPL
718213	2017 EM_{2}	—	February 20, 2014	Haleakala	Pan-STARRS 1	H	480 m	MPC · JPL
718214	2017 EG_{6}	—	March 1, 2011	Catalina	CSS	EUP	3.1 km	MPC · JPL
718215	2017 EB_{8}	—	April 3, 2013	Mount Lemmon	Mount Lemmon Survey	HNS	1.1 km	MPC · JPL
718216	2017 ER_{8}	—	August 28, 2014	Haleakala	Pan-STARRS 1	·	1.2 km	MPC · JPL
718217	2017 ET_{8}	—	May 11, 2008	Mount Lemmon	Mount Lemmon Survey	·	1.8 km	MPC · JPL
718218	2017 EX_{8}	—	March 26, 2008	Mount Lemmon	Mount Lemmon Survey	·	1.8 km	MPC · JPL
718219	2017 EN_{9}	—	October 29, 2014	Haleakala	Pan-STARRS 1	·	3.4 km	MPC · JPL
718220	2017 EP_{9}	—	December 3, 2005	Mauna Kea	A. Boattini	·	2.0 km	MPC · JPL
718221	2017 ET_{9}	—	August 12, 2010	Kitt Peak	Spacewatch	·	2.0 km	MPC · JPL
718222	2017 EX_{9}	—	October 20, 2006	Mount Lemmon	Mount Lemmon Survey	·	1.8 km	MPC · JPL
718223	2017 EE_{10}	—	February 24, 2017	Mount Lemmon	Mount Lemmon Survey	·	3.4 km	MPC · JPL
718224	2017 EC_{11}	—	February 1, 2017	Haleakala	Pan-STARRS 1	EUP	2.5 km	MPC · JPL
718225	2017 EK_{11}	—	October 28, 2014	Haleakala	Pan-STARRS 1	·	2.5 km	MPC · JPL
718226	2017 EU_{11}	—	September 29, 2003	Kitt Peak	Spacewatch	·	2.7 km	MPC · JPL
718227	2017 EU_{12}	—	January 28, 2017	Haleakala	Pan-STARRS 1	NYS	900 m	MPC · JPL
718228	2017 ED_{14}	—	October 7, 2005	Kitt Peak	Spacewatch	BRA	1.4 km	MPC · JPL
718229	2017 EQ_{14}	—	December 11, 2010	Mount Lemmon	Mount Lemmon Survey	NAE	2.7 km	MPC · JPL
718230	2017 EG_{15}	—	April 27, 2012	Haleakala	Pan-STARRS 1	·	2.8 km	MPC · JPL
718231	2017 EJ_{18}	—	February 28, 2012	Haleakala	Pan-STARRS 1	·	2.5 km	MPC · JPL
718232	2017 EM_{18}	—	February 21, 2012	Mount Lemmon	Mount Lemmon Survey	·	2.9 km	MPC · JPL
718233	2017 EP_{18}	—	October 29, 2009	Kitt Peak	Spacewatch	·	3.1 km	MPC · JPL
718234	2017 EX_{19}	—	March 27, 2012	Mount Lemmon	Mount Lemmon Survey	·	2.9 km	MPC · JPL
718235	2017 EW_{20}	—	November 23, 2006	Mount Lemmon	Mount Lemmon Survey	·	1.5 km	MPC · JPL
718236	2017 EP_{21}	—	October 12, 2015	Haleakala	Pan-STARRS 1	·	2.5 km	MPC · JPL
718237	2017 EW_{22}	—	December 11, 2013	Haleakala	Pan-STARRS 1	H	530 m	MPC · JPL
718238	2017 ES_{23}	—	January 30, 2011	Kitt Peak	Spacewatch	·	3.3 km	MPC · JPL
718239	2017 ER_{24}	—	December 4, 2015	Haleakala	Pan-STARRS 1	·	1.5 km	MPC · JPL
718240	2017 EA_{25}	—	April 16, 2012	Kitt Peak	Spacewatch	·	3.0 km	MPC · JPL
718241	2017 EB_{25}	—	February 21, 2012	Mount Lemmon	Mount Lemmon Survey	·	1.6 km	MPC · JPL
718242	2017 EH_{28}	—	March 4, 2017	Haleakala	Pan-STARRS 1	VER	1.8 km	MPC · JPL
718243	2017 EK_{30}	—	November 17, 2009	Mount Lemmon	Mount Lemmon Survey	·	430 m	MPC · JPL
718244	2017 EO_{30}	—	January 28, 2017	Haleakala	Pan-STARRS 1	·	1.5 km	MPC · JPL
718245	2017 EY_{30}	—	March 3, 2017	XuYi	PMO NEO Survey Program	·	2.4 km	MPC · JPL
718246	2017 ET_{39}	—	February 22, 2017	Mount Lemmon	Mount Lemmon Survey	EOS	1.6 km	MPC · JPL
718247	2017 EA_{41}	—	March 7, 2017	Haleakala	Pan-STARRS 1	·	530 m	MPC · JPL
718248	2017 EJ_{41}	—	March 4, 2017	Haleakala	Pan-STARRS 1	·	480 m	MPC · JPL
718249	2017 EF_{44}	—	March 4, 2017	Haleakala	Pan-STARRS 1	·	2.0 km	MPC · JPL
718250	2017 FE_{4}	—	September 29, 2014	Haleakala	Pan-STARRS 1	·	3.2 km	MPC · JPL
718251	2017 FL_{4}	—	April 2, 2006	Mount Lemmon	Mount Lemmon Survey	·	2.6 km	MPC · JPL
718252	2017 FB_{5}	—	September 23, 2009	Mount Lemmon	Mount Lemmon Survey	·	1.9 km	MPC · JPL
718253	2017 FB_{6}	—	March 12, 2008	Kitt Peak	Spacewatch	·	1.6 km	MPC · JPL
718254	2017 FG_{6}	—	January 11, 2011	Catalina	CSS	HYG	2.4 km	MPC · JPL
718255	2017 FE_{7}	—	November 30, 2005	Kitt Peak	Spacewatch	KOR	1.4 km	MPC · JPL
718256	2017 FE_{8}	—	March 11, 2002	Palomar	NEAT	·	2.3 km	MPC · JPL
718257	2017 FF_{8}	—	November 2, 2015	Mount Lemmon	Mount Lemmon Survey	·	3.6 km	MPC · JPL
718258	2017 FX_{8}	—	December 3, 2015	Haleakala	Pan-STARRS 1	·	2.7 km	MPC · JPL
718259	2017 FN_{9}	—	December 2, 2010	Kitt Peak	Spacewatch	·	2.5 km	MPC · JPL
718260	2017 FM_{10}	—	January 3, 2012	Kitt Peak	Spacewatch	·	1.7 km	MPC · JPL
718261	2017 FQ_{10}	—	October 13, 2010	Mount Lemmon	Mount Lemmon Survey	·	1.7 km	MPC · JPL
718262	2017 FD_{11}	—	November 25, 2009	Mount Lemmon	Mount Lemmon Survey	·	650 m	MPC · JPL
718263	2017 FQ_{11}	—	October 9, 2004	Kitt Peak	Spacewatch	·	2.4 km	MPC · JPL
718264	2017 FV_{11}	—	January 27, 2017	Haleakala	Pan-STARRS 1	·	2.1 km	MPC · JPL
718265	2017 FH_{12}	—	May 18, 2012	Kitt Peak	Spacewatch	·	2.5 km	MPC · JPL
718266	2017 FJ_{12}	—	October 1, 2014	Kitt Peak	Spacewatch	·	3.1 km	MPC · JPL
718267	2017 FC_{13}	—	November 20, 2009	Mount Lemmon	Mount Lemmon Survey	·	2.8 km	MPC · JPL
718268	2017 FC_{15}	—	February 23, 2007	Kitt Peak	Spacewatch	·	450 m	MPC · JPL
718269	2017 FO_{16}	—	February 7, 2011	Mount Lemmon	Mount Lemmon Survey	HYG	2.3 km	MPC · JPL
718270	2017 FN_{17}	—	February 7, 2006	Mount Lemmon	Mount Lemmon Survey	TIR	3.0 km	MPC · JPL
718271	2017 FP_{17}	—	August 22, 2014	Haleakala	Pan-STARRS 1	EOS	1.4 km	MPC · JPL
718272	2017 FO_{19}	—	November 3, 2010	Mount Lemmon	Mount Lemmon Survey	·	1.5 km	MPC · JPL
718273	2017 FP_{19}	—	March 6, 2011	Mount Lemmon	Mount Lemmon Survey	·	2.2 km	MPC · JPL
718274	2017 FS_{19}	—	March 2, 2011	Mount Lemmon	Mount Lemmon Survey	·	1.9 km	MPC · JPL
718275	2017 FX_{20}	—	August 20, 2014	Haleakala	Pan-STARRS 1	·	1.7 km	MPC · JPL
718276	2017 FB_{21}	—	February 8, 2011	Mount Lemmon	Mount Lemmon Survey	·	2.3 km	MPC · JPL
718277	2017 FA_{23}	—	August 18, 2014	Haleakala	Pan-STARRS 1	TEL	1.3 km	MPC · JPL
718278	2017 FD_{24}	—	September 2, 2014	Haleakala	Pan-STARRS 1	·	2.8 km	MPC · JPL
718279	2017 FZ_{25}	—	September 17, 2009	Mount Lemmon	Mount Lemmon Survey	·	2.2 km	MPC · JPL
718280	2017 FN_{26}	—	October 16, 2009	Mount Lemmon	Mount Lemmon Survey	·	2.5 km	MPC · JPL
718281	2017 FP_{26}	—	February 24, 2017	Haleakala	Pan-STARRS 1	LIX	2.7 km	MPC · JPL
718282	2017 FD_{27}	—	February 8, 2011	Mount Lemmon	Mount Lemmon Survey	LIX	2.9 km	MPC · JPL
718283	2017 FH_{27}	—	August 23, 2014	Haleakala	Pan-STARRS 1	EOS	1.6 km	MPC · JPL
718284	2017 FN_{27}	—	March 29, 2012	Haleakala	Pan-STARRS 1	·	2.0 km	MPC · JPL
718285	2017 FQ_{27}	—	November 26, 2005	Mount Lemmon	Mount Lemmon Survey	·	1.8 km	MPC · JPL
718286	2017 FF_{28}	—	October 10, 2015	Haleakala	Pan-STARRS 1	·	2.0 km	MPC · JPL
718287	2017 FX_{28}	—	January 4, 2016	Haleakala	Pan-STARRS 1	·	2.2 km	MPC · JPL
718288	2017 FB_{29}	—	October 16, 2009	Mount Lemmon	Mount Lemmon Survey	·	2.2 km	MPC · JPL
718289	2017 FX_{30}	—	September 6, 2008	Kitt Peak	Spacewatch	·	2.5 km	MPC · JPL
718290	2017 FR_{31}	—	January 4, 2016	Haleakala	Pan-STARRS 1	·	2.3 km	MPC · JPL
718291	2017 FE_{32}	—	February 24, 2006	Kitt Peak	Spacewatch	V	490 m	MPC · JPL
718292	2017 FM_{32}	—	January 31, 2011	Piszkés-tető	K. Sárneczky, Z. Kuli	·	2.7 km	MPC · JPL
718293	2017 FZ_{33}	—	December 9, 2015	Haleakala	Pan-STARRS 1	·	2.5 km	MPC · JPL
718294	2017 FP_{34}	—	March 24, 2006	Mount Lemmon	Mount Lemmon Survey	VER	2.1 km	MPC · JPL
718295	2017 FX_{34}	—	June 18, 2013	Haleakala	Pan-STARRS 1	·	3.2 km	MPC · JPL
718296	2017 FC_{35}	—	March 9, 2011	Mount Lemmon	Mount Lemmon Survey	VER	2.1 km	MPC · JPL
718297	2017 FD_{35}	—	May 16, 2007	Mount Lemmon	Mount Lemmon Survey	·	1.8 km	MPC · JPL
718298	2017 FA_{37}	—	January 23, 2006	Mount Lemmon	Mount Lemmon Survey	·	2.5 km	MPC · JPL
718299	2017 FK_{37}	—	December 9, 2010	Mount Lemmon	Mount Lemmon Survey	·	3.2 km	MPC · JPL
718300	2017 FF_{38}	—	August 22, 2003	Palomar	NEAT	·	2.5 km	MPC · JPL

== 718301–718400 ==
back to top

Designation			Discovery			Properties		Ref
Permanent	Provisional	Named after	Date	Site	Discoverer(s)	Category	Diam.	Ref
718301	2017 FF_{39}	—	August 21, 2006	Kitt Peak	Spacewatch	MAR	800 m	MPC · JPL
718302	2017 FO_{39}	—	February 7, 2011	Mount Lemmon	Mount Lemmon Survey	·	2.7 km	MPC · JPL
718303	2017 FX_{40}	—	February 4, 2005	Kitt Peak	Spacewatch	VER	2.6 km	MPC · JPL
718304	2017 FS_{41}	—	November 13, 2010	Mount Lemmon	Mount Lemmon Survey	·	1.9 km	MPC · JPL
718305	2017 FZ_{41}	—	February 3, 2000	Kitt Peak	Spacewatch	·	460 m	MPC · JPL
718306	2017 FN_{42}	—	November 23, 2009	Mount Lemmon	Mount Lemmon Survey	·	2.4 km	MPC · JPL
718307	2017 FA_{43}	—	October 1, 2014	Haleakala	Pan-STARRS 1	·	2.2 km	MPC · JPL
718308	2017 FM_{43}	—	January 29, 2012	Mayhill-ISON	L. Elenin	·	2.0 km	MPC · JPL
718309	2017 FU_{43}	—	November 17, 2009	Kitt Peak	Spacewatch	EOS	1.7 km	MPC · JPL
718310	2017 FW_{43}	—	May 31, 2012	Mount Lemmon	Mount Lemmon Survey	·	3.1 km	MPC · JPL
718311	2017 FL_{44}	—	November 7, 2005	Mauna Kea	A. Boattini	·	2.4 km	MPC · JPL
718312	2017 FO_{46}	—	January 13, 2011	Kitt Peak	Spacewatch	·	3.3 km	MPC · JPL
718313	2017 FQ_{46}	—	September 17, 2009	Kitt Peak	Spacewatch	·	1.9 km	MPC · JPL
718314	2017 FX_{46}	—	November 26, 2009	Kitt Peak	Spacewatch	·	2.7 km	MPC · JPL
718315	2017 FH_{47}	—	April 21, 2014	Mount Lemmon	Mount Lemmon Survey	·	540 m	MPC · JPL
718316	2017 FL_{47}	—	September 18, 2006	Kitt Peak	Spacewatch	MAR	870 m	MPC · JPL
718317	2017 FV_{47}	—	January 30, 2006	Kitt Peak	Spacewatch	EOS	1.4 km	MPC · JPL
718318	2017 FW_{47}	—	September 19, 2014	Haleakala	Pan-STARRS 1	NAE	2.1 km	MPC · JPL
718319	2017 FO_{48}	—	April 20, 2012	Kitt Peak	Spacewatch	·	2.0 km	MPC · JPL
718320	2017 FQ_{48}	—	February 8, 2011	Mount Lemmon	Mount Lemmon Survey	·	2.2 km	MPC · JPL
718321	2017 FU_{48}	—	May 8, 2005	Kitt Peak	Spacewatch	·	1.2 km	MPC · JPL
718322	2017 FY_{48}	—	December 2, 2005	Kitt Peak	L. H. Wasserman, R. L. Millis	·	2.6 km	MPC · JPL
718323	2017 FN_{49}	—	February 10, 2011	Mount Lemmon	Mount Lemmon Survey	·	2.2 km	MPC · JPL
718324	2017 FQ_{49}	—	March 13, 2012	Mount Lemmon	Mount Lemmon Survey	KOR	1.1 km	MPC · JPL
718325	2017 FT_{50}	—	December 5, 2010	Kitt Peak	Spacewatch	EOS	1.7 km	MPC · JPL
718326	2017 FV_{50}	—	December 27, 2005	Kitt Peak	Spacewatch	EOS	1.8 km	MPC · JPL
718327	2017 FD_{51}	—	November 20, 2009	Mount Lemmon	Mount Lemmon Survey	·	2.4 km	MPC · JPL
718328	2017 FL_{51}	—	May 21, 2012	Haleakala	Pan-STARRS 1	·	2.6 km	MPC · JPL
718329	2017 FS_{51}	—	October 1, 2014	Haleakala	Pan-STARRS 1	·	2.1 km	MPC · JPL
718330	2017 FV_{51}	—	March 9, 2011	Mount Lemmon	Mount Lemmon Survey	·	3.2 km	MPC · JPL
718331	2017 FX_{51}	—	May 16, 2012	Haleakala	Pan-STARRS 1	·	2.9 km	MPC · JPL
718332	2017 FZ_{51}	—	December 20, 2001	Kitt Peak	Spacewatch	615	1.6 km	MPC · JPL
718333	2017 FS_{52}	—	February 25, 2011	Zelenchukskaya Station	T. V. Krjačko, B. Satovski	·	2.4 km	MPC · JPL
718334	2017 FX_{52}	—	May 14, 2012	Mount Lemmon	Mount Lemmon Survey	LIX	3.5 km	MPC · JPL
718335	2017 FK_{53}	—	May 4, 2006	Catalina	CSS	TIR	3.0 km	MPC · JPL
718336	2017 FA_{54}	—	August 29, 2014	Mount Lemmon	Mount Lemmon Survey	·	2.1 km	MPC · JPL
718337	2017 FT_{54}	—	February 8, 2011	Mount Lemmon	Mount Lemmon Survey	·	2.5 km	MPC · JPL
718338	2017 FB_{55}	—	March 17, 2012	Mount Lemmon	Mount Lemmon Survey	·	1.8 km	MPC · JPL
718339	2017 FQ_{55}	—	February 8, 2011	Mount Lemmon	Mount Lemmon Survey	·	2.4 km	MPC · JPL
718340	2017 FY_{55}	—	October 26, 2011	Haleakala	Pan-STARRS 1	·	1.1 km	MPC · JPL
718341	2017 FA_{56}	—	January 26, 2011	Mount Lemmon	Mount Lemmon Survey	·	2.4 km	MPC · JPL
718342	2017 FQ_{56}	—	January 10, 2011	Mount Lemmon	Mount Lemmon Survey	·	3.0 km	MPC · JPL
718343	2017 FU_{56}	—	February 25, 2011	Mount Lemmon	Mount Lemmon Survey	·	3.3 km	MPC · JPL
718344	2017 FU_{57}	—	November 19, 2009	Mount Lemmon	Mount Lemmon Survey	EOS	1.8 km	MPC · JPL
718345	2017 FB_{58}	—	April 23, 2007	Mount Lemmon	Mount Lemmon Survey	·	1.8 km	MPC · JPL
718346	2017 FS_{58}	—	February 23, 2017	Mount Lemmon	Mount Lemmon Survey	·	2.6 km	MPC · JPL
718347	2017 FM_{60}	—	February 8, 2011	Mount Lemmon	Mount Lemmon Survey	·	2.1 km	MPC · JPL
718348	2017 FT_{62}	—	July 29, 2014	Haleakala	Pan-STARRS 1	·	1.9 km	MPC · JPL
718349	2017 FW_{62}	—	September 22, 2014	Haleakala	Pan-STARRS 1	·	2.8 km	MPC · JPL
718350	2017 FL_{66}	—	February 1, 2011	Piszkéstető	Kuli, Z., K. Sárneczky	·	2.2 km	MPC · JPL
718351	2017 FM_{66}	—	September 17, 2009	Mount Lemmon	Mount Lemmon Survey	EOS	1.7 km	MPC · JPL
718352	2017 FQ_{66}	—	October 14, 2009	Mount Lemmon	Mount Lemmon Survey	VER	2.4 km	MPC · JPL
718353	2017 FV_{66}	—	January 10, 2011	Mount Lemmon	Mount Lemmon Survey	EOS	1.8 km	MPC · JPL
718354	2017 FC_{67}	—	November 16, 2009	Mount Lemmon	Mount Lemmon Survey	·	2.1 km	MPC · JPL
718355	2017 FM_{67}	—	September 19, 2009	Kitt Peak	Spacewatch	·	3.0 km	MPC · JPL
718356	2017 FU_{67}	—	November 15, 2003	Kitt Peak	Spacewatch	VER	2.7 km	MPC · JPL
718357	2017 FJ_{68}	—	March 18, 2017	Mount Lemmon	Mount Lemmon Survey	VER	1.9 km	MPC · JPL
718358	2017 FM_{69}	—	March 10, 2003	Kitt Peak	Spacewatch	·	1.7 km	MPC · JPL
718359	2017 FS_{69}	—	January 27, 2011	Mount Lemmon	Mount Lemmon Survey	·	2.2 km	MPC · JPL
718360	2017 FU_{69}	—	March 12, 2008	Kitt Peak	Spacewatch	·	1.8 km	MPC · JPL
718361	2017 FN_{70}	—	September 15, 2009	Kitt Peak	Spacewatch	·	1.6 km	MPC · JPL
718362	2017 FQ_{70}	—	October 17, 2014	Mount Lemmon	Mount Lemmon Survey	·	2.3 km	MPC · JPL
718363	2017 FN_{71}	—	December 13, 2010	Mount Lemmon	Mount Lemmon Survey	BRA	1.2 km	MPC · JPL
718364	2017 FD_{73}	—	April 14, 2004	Kitt Peak	Spacewatch	·	550 m	MPC · JPL
718365	2017 FO_{73}	—	July 28, 2014	Haleakala	Pan-STARRS 1	EOS	1.4 km	MPC · JPL
718366	2017 FC_{74}	—	August 28, 2014	Haleakala	Pan-STARRS 1	EOS	1.4 km	MPC · JPL
718367	2017 FU_{74}	—	February 13, 2008	Kitt Peak	Spacewatch	·	1.7 km	MPC · JPL
718368	2017 FK_{76}	—	November 21, 2014	Haleakala	Pan-STARRS 1	URS	2.6 km	MPC · JPL
718369	2017 FE_{78}	—	October 28, 2014	Haleakala	Pan-STARRS 1	·	2.9 km	MPC · JPL
718370	2017 FJ_{78}	—	September 18, 2003	Kitt Peak	Spacewatch	EOS	1.6 km	MPC · JPL
718371	2017 FM_{78}	—	April 24, 2012	Mount Lemmon	Mount Lemmon Survey	EOS	1.5 km	MPC · JPL
718372	2017 FK_{79}	—	March 19, 2017	Mount Lemmon	Mount Lemmon Survey	·	1.9 km	MPC · JPL
718373	2017 FT_{79}	—	January 30, 2011	Mount Lemmon	Mount Lemmon Survey	·	2.4 km	MPC · JPL
718374	2017 FC_{80}	—	October 14, 2010	Mount Lemmon	Mount Lemmon Survey	·	2.5 km	MPC · JPL
718375	2017 FE_{80}	—	September 19, 2015	Haleakala	Pan-STARRS 1	·	1.9 km	MPC · JPL
718376	2017 FK_{80}	—	November 16, 2009	Mount Lemmon	Mount Lemmon Survey	·	460 m	MPC · JPL
718377	2017 FW_{80}	—	January 30, 2011	Haleakala	Pan-STARRS 1	·	2.4 km	MPC · JPL
718378	2017 FW_{81}	—	July 15, 2013	Haleakala	Pan-STARRS 1	·	2.4 km	MPC · JPL
718379	2017 FO_{82}	—	February 25, 2011	Mount Lemmon	Mount Lemmon Survey	·	2.5 km	MPC · JPL
718380	2017 FU_{82}	—	April 7, 2003	Kitt Peak	Spacewatch	·	1.8 km	MPC · JPL
718381	2017 FW_{83}	—	May 23, 2012	Mount Lemmon	Mount Lemmon Survey	·	2.9 km	MPC · JPL
718382	2017 FJ_{84}	—	January 26, 2011	Mount Lemmon	Mount Lemmon Survey	·	3.1 km	MPC · JPL
718383	2017 FX_{84}	—	June 24, 2014	Haleakala	Pan-STARRS 1	·	1.6 km	MPC · JPL
718384	2017 FJ_{86}	—	November 24, 2014	Haleakala	Pan-STARRS 1	VER	2.8 km	MPC · JPL
718385	2017 FK_{86}	—	January 27, 2011	Mount Lemmon	Mount Lemmon Survey	EOS	1.4 km	MPC · JPL
718386	2017 FZ_{86}	—	October 9, 2015	Haleakala	Pan-STARRS 1	·	590 m	MPC · JPL
718387	2017 FJ_{87}	—	December 10, 2009	Mount Lemmon	Mount Lemmon Survey	·	2.7 km	MPC · JPL
718388	2017 FT_{88}	—	March 31, 2012	Kitt Peak	Spacewatch	·	1.7 km	MPC · JPL
718389	2017 FX_{88}	—	June 15, 2012	Mount Lemmon	Mount Lemmon Survey	LIX	3.0 km	MPC · JPL
718390	2017 FX_{91}	—	November 16, 2014	Mount Lemmon	Mount Lemmon Survey	EOS	1.8 km	MPC · JPL
718391	2017 FM_{92}	—	June 16, 2006	Kitt Peak	Spacewatch	·	2.5 km	MPC · JPL
718392	2017 FO_{92}	—	January 7, 2010	Kitt Peak	Spacewatch	·	590 m	MPC · JPL
718393	2017 FR_{92}	—	October 16, 2009	Mount Lemmon	Mount Lemmon Survey	EOS	1.8 km	MPC · JPL
718394	2017 FX_{92}	—	April 30, 2012	Kitt Peak	Spacewatch	LIX	3.1 km	MPC · JPL
718395	2017 FT_{93}	—	November 19, 2007	Mount Lemmon	Mount Lemmon Survey	EUN	1.1 km	MPC · JPL
718396	2017 FU_{93}	—	September 4, 2014	Haleakala	Pan-STARRS 1	·	2.0 km	MPC · JPL
718397	2017 FA_{95}	—	November 22, 2009	Kitt Peak	Spacewatch	·	3.0 km	MPC · JPL
718398	2017 FB_{96}	—	October 22, 2003	Kitt Peak	Spacewatch	·	2.6 km	MPC · JPL
718399	2017 FN_{96}	—	November 27, 2014	Haleakala	Pan-STARRS 1	·	3.4 km	MPC · JPL
718400	2017 FN_{97}	—	May 31, 2006	Kitt Peak	Spacewatch	TIR	2.5 km	MPC · JPL

== 718401–718500 ==
back to top

Designation			Discovery			Properties		Ref
Permanent	Provisional	Named after	Date	Site	Discoverer(s)	Category	Diam.	Ref
718401	2017 FX_{97}	—	September 20, 2006	Catalina	CSS	·	2.3 km	MPC · JPL
718402	2017 FC_{98}	—	September 23, 2008	Mount Lemmon	Mount Lemmon Survey	(69559)	3.2 km	MPC · JPL
718403	2017 FK_{99}	—	May 8, 2013	La Silla	TRAPPIST	·	1.6 km	MPC · JPL
718404	2017 FY_{99}	—	October 22, 2009	Mount Lemmon	Mount Lemmon Survey	EOS	1.8 km	MPC · JPL
718405	2017 FC_{100}	—	January 12, 2011	Mount Lemmon	Mount Lemmon Survey	·	2.0 km	MPC · JPL
718406	2017 FE_{100}	—	October 8, 2008	Mount Lemmon	Mount Lemmon Survey	EOS	1.6 km	MPC · JPL
718407	2017 FK_{100}	—	March 25, 2017	Haleakala	Pan-STARRS 1	·	530 m	MPC · JPL
718408	2017 FL_{100}	—	December 11, 2010	Mount Lemmon	Mount Lemmon Survey	·	1.9 km	MPC · JPL
718409	2017 FA_{103}	—	June 24, 2014	Haleakala	Pan-STARRS 1	HNS	1.2 km	MPC · JPL
718410	2017 FL_{103}	—	September 19, 2014	Haleakala	Pan-STARRS 1	·	2.3 km	MPC · JPL
718411	2017 FS_{103}	—	February 25, 2012	Mount Lemmon	Mount Lemmon Survey	·	1.8 km	MPC · JPL
718412	2017 FY_{104}	—	September 14, 2013	Mount Lemmon	Mount Lemmon Survey	·	2.6 km	MPC · JPL
718413	2017 FW_{105}	—	March 1, 2005	Kitt Peak	Spacewatch	·	2.8 km	MPC · JPL
718414	2017 FF_{107}	—	April 27, 2012	Haleakala	Pan-STARRS 1	LIX	3.4 km	MPC · JPL
718415	2017 FT_{107}	—	January 11, 2011	Kitt Peak	Spacewatch	·	2.7 km	MPC · JPL
718416	2017 FC_{108}	—	May 27, 2012	Mount Lemmon	Mount Lemmon Survey	·	2.9 km	MPC · JPL
718417	2017 FJ_{108}	—	January 15, 2011	Mount Lemmon	Mount Lemmon Survey	·	2.5 km	MPC · JPL
718418	2017 FM_{108}	—	November 9, 2009	Mount Lemmon	Mount Lemmon Survey	·	2.7 km	MPC · JPL
718419	2017 FA_{109}	—	January 28, 2016	Haleakala	Pan-STARRS 1	·	3.8 km	MPC · JPL
718420	2017 FN_{109}	—	August 27, 2014	Haleakala	Pan-STARRS 1	EOS	1.4 km	MPC · JPL
718421	2017 FL_{112}	—	September 6, 2008	Mount Lemmon	Mount Lemmon Survey	·	2.1 km	MPC · JPL
718422	2017 FF_{113}	—	February 2, 2006	Mount Lemmon	Mount Lemmon Survey	EOS	1.6 km	MPC · JPL
718423	2017 FY_{113}	—	March 19, 2017	Haleakala	Pan-STARRS 1	·	2.2 km	MPC · JPL
718424	2017 FR_{115}	—	January 3, 2016	Mount Lemmon	Mount Lemmon Survey	·	1.3 km	MPC · JPL
718425	2017 FD_{116}	—	February 17, 2007	Mount Lemmon	Mount Lemmon Survey	·	480 m	MPC · JPL
718426	2017 FF_{116}	—	February 21, 2007	Kitt Peak	Spacewatch	·	2.1 km	MPC · JPL
718427	2017 FR_{117}	—	March 26, 2017	Mount Lemmon	Mount Lemmon Survey	EOS	1.4 km	MPC · JPL
718428	2017 FW_{117}	—	September 24, 2013	Mount Lemmon	Mount Lemmon Survey	·	3.6 km	MPC · JPL
718429	2017 FL_{118}	—	February 25, 2011	Mount Lemmon	Mount Lemmon Survey	·	2.4 km	MPC · JPL
718430	2017 FF_{119}	—	April 14, 2008	Mount Lemmon	Mount Lemmon Survey	MRX	990 m	MPC · JPL
718431	2017 FB_{120}	—	February 27, 2006	Kitt Peak	Spacewatch	·	2.1 km	MPC · JPL
718432	2017 FE_{120}	—	September 4, 2008	Kitt Peak	Spacewatch	URS	3.1 km	MPC · JPL
718433	2017 FO_{122}	—	March 18, 2004	Kitt Peak	Spacewatch	·	1.5 km	MPC · JPL
718434	2017 FT_{122}	—	February 21, 2017	Haleakala	Pan-STARRS 1	·	570 m	MPC · JPL
718435	2017 FD_{123}	—	March 22, 2012	Catalina	CSS	·	2.0 km	MPC · JPL
718436	2017 FH_{124}	—	April 1, 2011	Kitt Peak	Spacewatch	·	2.8 km	MPC · JPL
718437	2017 FT_{124}	—	May 21, 2013	Mount Lemmon	Mount Lemmon Survey	·	2.2 km	MPC · JPL
718438	2017 FR_{126}	—	January 30, 2011	Mount Lemmon	Mount Lemmon Survey	·	2.6 km	MPC · JPL
718439	2017 FW_{126}	—	March 17, 2007	Kitt Peak	Spacewatch	·	1.7 km	MPC · JPL
718440	2017 FX_{131}	—	February 21, 2017	Haleakala	Pan-STARRS 1	·	2.0 km	MPC · JPL
718441	2017 FP_{132}	—	February 27, 2006	Kitt Peak	Spacewatch	·	2.1 km	MPC · JPL
718442	2017 FU_{133}	—	August 31, 2013	Haleakala	Pan-STARRS 1	·	2.6 km	MPC · JPL
718443	2017 FP_{135}	—	March 6, 2011	Mount Lemmon	Mount Lemmon Survey	·	2.4 km	MPC · JPL
718444	2017 FU_{136}	—	April 9, 2006	Mount Lemmon	Mount Lemmon Survey	·	2.3 km	MPC · JPL
718445	2017 FA_{137}	—	September 19, 2014	Haleakala	Pan-STARRS 1	·	1.7 km	MPC · JPL
718446	2017 FX_{138}	—	November 19, 2009	Kitt Peak	Spacewatch	·	2.9 km	MPC · JPL
718447	2017 FY_{138}	—	October 12, 2010	Mount Lemmon	Mount Lemmon Survey	·	1.6 km	MPC · JPL
718448	2017 FB_{140}	—	October 26, 2009	Mount Lemmon	Mount Lemmon Survey	·	2.4 km	MPC · JPL
718449	2017 FW_{141}	—	January 2, 2011	Mount Lemmon	Mount Lemmon Survey	TEL	1.4 km	MPC · JPL
718450	2017 FF_{142}	—	December 6, 2015	Mount Lemmon	Mount Lemmon Survey	EOS	1.7 km	MPC · JPL
718451	2017 FX_{143}	—	April 6, 2008	Mount Lemmon	Mount Lemmon Survey	·	1.6 km	MPC · JPL
718452	2017 FE_{145}	—	February 22, 2006	Anderson Mesa	LONEOS	·	2.6 km	MPC · JPL
718453	2017 FG_{145}	—	April 22, 2007	Mount Lemmon	Mount Lemmon Survey	·	1.2 km	MPC · JPL
718454	2017 FM_{147}	—	January 4, 2006	Kitt Peak	Spacewatch	·	2.1 km	MPC · JPL
718455	2017 FP_{147}	—	March 29, 2012	Mount Lemmon	Mount Lemmon Survey	·	2.4 km	MPC · JPL
718456	2017 FT_{147}	—	February 27, 2012	Haleakala	Pan-STARRS 1	·	1.4 km	MPC · JPL
718457	2017 FB_{150}	—	October 25, 2008	Mount Lemmon	Mount Lemmon Survey	·	2.4 km	MPC · JPL
718458	2017 FA_{151}	—	January 26, 2006	Kitt Peak	Spacewatch	·	830 m	MPC · JPL
718459	2017 FK_{152}	—	May 12, 2012	Mount Lemmon	Mount Lemmon Survey	·	2.4 km	MPC · JPL
718460	2017 FQ_{154}	—	February 21, 2017	Haleakala	Pan-STARRS 1	·	2.4 km	MPC · JPL
718461	2017 FD_{155}	—	October 26, 2008	Kitt Peak	Spacewatch	·	3.2 km	MPC · JPL
718462	2017 FU_{155}	—	August 23, 2014	Haleakala	Pan-STARRS 1	JUN	1.0 km	MPC · JPL
718463	2017 FW_{155}	—	January 14, 2011	Mount Lemmon	Mount Lemmon Survey	·	2.2 km	MPC · JPL
718464	2017 FR_{157}	—	September 27, 2009	Kitt Peak	Spacewatch	EOS	1.9 km	MPC · JPL
718465	2017 FU_{157}	—	January 27, 2011	Kitt Peak	Spacewatch	·	2.7 km	MPC · JPL
718466	2017 FO_{160}	—	May 13, 2008	Mount Lemmon	Mount Lemmon Survey	·	1.7 km	MPC · JPL
718467	2017 FC_{161}	—	January 28, 2011	Mount Lemmon	Mount Lemmon Survey	·	2.9 km	MPC · JPL
718468	2017 FD_{161}	—	October 1, 2014	Haleakala	Pan-STARRS 1	EOS	1.6 km	MPC · JPL
718469	2017 FY_{161}	—	February 5, 2011	Haleakala	Pan-STARRS 1	·	2.7 km	MPC · JPL
718470	2017 FV_{162}	—	December 10, 2010	Mount Lemmon	Mount Lemmon Survey	EOS	1.8 km	MPC · JPL
718471	2017 FE_{166}	—	August 22, 2014	Haleakala	Pan-STARRS 1	·	1.4 km	MPC · JPL
718472	2017 FJ_{170}	—	September 10, 2008	Kitt Peak	Spacewatch	·	2.3 km	MPC · JPL
718473	2017 FJ_{173}	—	July 16, 2004	Cerro Tololo	Deep Ecliptic Survey	KOR	1.1 km	MPC · JPL
718474	2017 FN_{173}	—	March 19, 2017	Haleakala	Pan-STARRS 1	·	2.3 km	MPC · JPL
718475	2017 FH_{174}	—	March 21, 2017	Haleakala	Pan-STARRS 1	EOS	1.4 km	MPC · JPL
718476	2017 FE_{175}	—	February 8, 2011	Mount Lemmon	Mount Lemmon Survey	·	1.9 km	MPC · JPL
718477	2017 FK_{175}	—	March 23, 2017	Haleakala	Pan-STARRS 1	·	560 m	MPC · JPL
718478	2017 FX_{177}	—	March 29, 2017	Haleakala	Pan-STARRS 1	·	1.1 km	MPC · JPL
718479	2017 FC_{180}	—	March 19, 2017	Haleakala	Pan-STARRS 1	VER	2.0 km	MPC · JPL
718480	2017 FH_{183}	—	March 21, 2017	Haleakala	Pan-STARRS 1	·	2.4 km	MPC · JPL
718481	2017 FJ_{183}	—	March 18, 2017	Haleakala	Pan-STARRS 1	·	1.9 km	MPC · JPL
718482	2017 FO_{186}	—	March 19, 2017	Haleakala	Pan-STARRS 1	·	2.0 km	MPC · JPL
718483	2017 FR_{191}	—	March 18, 2017	Mount Lemmon	Mount Lemmon Survey	EOS	1.4 km	MPC · JPL
718484	2017 FV_{199}	—	March 19, 2017	Mount Lemmon	Mount Lemmon Survey	EOS	1.6 km	MPC · JPL
718485	2017 FZ_{199}	—	March 27, 2017	Haleakala	Pan-STARRS 1	·	480 m	MPC · JPL
718486	2017 FG_{200}	—	March 17, 2017	Mount Lemmon	Mount Lemmon Survey	·	2.2 km	MPC · JPL
718487	2017 FP_{205}	—	March 18, 2017	Mount Lemmon	Mount Lemmon Survey	·	2.0 km	MPC · JPL
718488	2017 FJ_{207}	—	October 30, 2014	Haleakala	Pan-STARRS 1	·	2.2 km	MPC · JPL
718489	2017 FZ_{211}	—	March 22, 2017	Haleakala	Pan-STARRS 1	GEF	850 m	MPC · JPL
718490 Marcelosouza	2017 FZ_{216}	Marcelosouza	March 28, 2017	La Palma	EURONEAR	·	1.1 km	MPC · JPL
718491	2017 FK_{226}	—	March 28, 2017	Haleakala	Pan-STARRS 1	VER	1.7 km	MPC · JPL
718492 Quro	2017 FZ_{233}	Quro	March 22, 2017	Mauna Kea	COIAS	·	1.7 km	MPC · JPL
718493	2017 GT	—	August 9, 2013	Catalina	CSS	LIX	3.3 km	MPC · JPL
718494	2017 GK_{1}	—	February 26, 2012	Mount Lemmon	Mount Lemmon Survey	EOS	1.6 km	MPC · JPL
718495	2017 GA_{2}	—	March 5, 2006	Kitt Peak	Spacewatch	·	2.4 km	MPC · JPL
718496	2017 GS_{2}	—	November 1, 2008	Mount Lemmon	Mount Lemmon Survey	·	640 m	MPC · JPL
718497	2017 GO_{18}	—	April 2, 2017	Haleakala	Pan-STARRS 1	·	3.3 km	MPC · JPL
718498	2017 GJ_{22}	—	April 3, 2017	Haleakala	Pan-STARRS 1	·	2.1 km	MPC · JPL
718499	2017 HV_{5}	—	October 21, 2014	Mount Lemmon	Mount Lemmon Survey	·	3.1 km	MPC · JPL
718500	2017 HQ_{10}	—	November 21, 2014	Haleakala	Pan-STARRS 1	·	3.2 km	MPC · JPL

== 718501–718600 ==
back to top

Designation			Discovery			Properties		Ref
Permanent	Provisional	Named after	Date	Site	Discoverer(s)	Category	Diam.	Ref
718501	2017 HS_{13}	—	January 26, 2006	Mount Lemmon	Mount Lemmon Survey	·	1.5 km	MPC · JPL
718502	2017 HT_{13}	—	August 27, 2001	Palomar	NEAT	·	570 m	MPC · JPL
718503	2017 HW_{15}	—	October 18, 2009	Mount Lemmon	Mount Lemmon Survey	·	1.7 km	MPC · JPL
718504	2017 HH_{16}	—	April 19, 2017	Mount Lemmon	Mount Lemmon Survey	·	570 m	MPC · JPL
718505	2017 HL_{16}	—	February 1, 2016	Haleakala	Pan-STARRS 1	·	1.9 km	MPC · JPL
718506	2017 HS_{18}	—	August 22, 2004	Kitt Peak	Spacewatch	·	1.8 km	MPC · JPL
718507	2017 HU_{18}	—	February 5, 2011	Mount Lemmon	Mount Lemmon Survey	HYG	2.5 km	MPC · JPL
718508	2017 HM_{19}	—	March 11, 2007	Kitt Peak	Spacewatch	·	2.8 km	MPC · JPL
718509	2017 HD_{20}	—	January 30, 2011	Mount Lemmon	Mount Lemmon Survey	·	1.8 km	MPC · JPL
718510	2017 HN_{24}	—	April 16, 2013	Haleakala	Pan-STARRS 1	·	930 m	MPC · JPL
718511	2017 HC_{25}	—	March 9, 2007	Palomar	NEAT	·	570 m	MPC · JPL
718512	2017 HT_{26}	—	April 25, 2017	Haleakala	Pan-STARRS 1	·	500 m	MPC · JPL
718513	2017 HA_{27}	—	September 6, 2013	Kitt Peak	Spacewatch	·	2.3 km	MPC · JPL
718514	2017 HN_{27}	—	January 14, 2016	Haleakala	Pan-STARRS 1	·	2.6 km	MPC · JPL
718515	2017 HD_{29}	—	November 2, 2007	Mount Lemmon	Mount Lemmon Survey	·	2.8 km	MPC · JPL
718516	2017 HF_{29}	—	November 26, 2014	Haleakala	Pan-STARRS 1	·	3.2 km	MPC · JPL
718517	2017 HR_{29}	—	April 25, 2017	Haleakala	Pan-STARRS 1	EOS	1.4 km	MPC · JPL
718518	2017 HT_{29}	—	August 2, 2013	Haleakala	Pan-STARRS 1	BRA	1.5 km	MPC · JPL
718519	2017 HC_{35}	—	August 23, 2007	Kitt Peak	Spacewatch	·	2.7 km	MPC · JPL
718520	2017 HD_{35}	—	October 6, 2008	Mount Lemmon	Mount Lemmon Survey	·	2.3 km	MPC · JPL
718521	2017 HV_{36}	—	July 14, 2013	Haleakala	Pan-STARRS 1	·	3.5 km	MPC · JPL
718522	2017 HZ_{39}	—	September 10, 2007	Kitt Peak	Spacewatch	THM	2.5 km	MPC · JPL
718523	2017 HC_{40}	—	April 18, 2007	Mount Lemmon	Mount Lemmon Survey	·	560 m	MPC · JPL
718524	2017 HY_{41}	—	February 9, 2016	Mount Lemmon	Mount Lemmon Survey	KOR	970 m	MPC · JPL
718525	2017 HT_{43}	—	March 30, 2000	Kitt Peak	Spacewatch	·	2.9 km	MPC · JPL
718526	2017 HO_{48}	—	March 8, 2005	Mount Lemmon	Mount Lemmon Survey	·	2.6 km	MPC · JPL
718527	2017 HR_{48}	—	May 21, 2012	Mount Lemmon	Mount Lemmon Survey	·	1.6 km	MPC · JPL
718528	2017 HU_{48}	—	January 17, 2016	Haleakala	Pan-STARRS 1	·	3.4 km	MPC · JPL
718529	2017 HN_{50}	—	September 19, 1998	Apache Point	SDSS Collaboration	·	580 m	MPC · JPL
718530	2017 HT_{57}	—	December 10, 2014	Mount Lemmon	Mount Lemmon Survey	·	1.8 km	MPC · JPL
718531	2017 HP_{59}	—	September 15, 2013	Mount Lemmon	Mount Lemmon Survey	·	2.3 km	MPC · JPL
718532	2017 HK_{62}	—	September 1, 2013	Haleakala	Pan-STARRS 1	·	2.1 km	MPC · JPL
718533	2017 HE_{68}	—	April 25, 2017	Haleakala	Pan-STARRS 1	·	2.2 km	MPC · JPL
718534	2017 HX_{68}	—	April 26, 2017	Haleakala	Pan-STARRS 1	·	2.3 km	MPC · JPL
718535	2017 HS_{70}	—	April 26, 2017	Haleakala	Pan-STARRS 1	·	460 m	MPC · JPL
718536	2017 HC_{71}	—	April 26, 2017	Haleakala	Pan-STARRS 1	·	2.6 km	MPC · JPL
718537	2017 HK_{72}	—	April 16, 2017	Cerro Paranal	Altmann, M., Prusti, T.	·	410 m	MPC · JPL
718538	2017 HK_{73}	—	April 27, 2017	Haleakala	Pan-STARRS 1	·	2.3 km	MPC · JPL
718539	2017 HW_{80}	—	April 16, 2017	Haleakala	Pan-STARRS 1	EUN	1.0 km	MPC · JPL
718540	2017 HF_{82}	—	March 15, 2007	Kitt Peak	Spacewatch	·	600 m	MPC · JPL
718541	2017 HG_{82}	—	April 20, 2017	Haleakala	Pan-STARRS 1	·	440 m	MPC · JPL
718542	2017 HJ_{82}	—	April 20, 2017	Haleakala	Pan-STARRS 1	·	550 m	MPC · JPL
718543	2017 HK_{95}	—	April 20, 2017	Haleakala	Pan-STARRS 1	KOR	910 m	MPC · JPL
718544	2017 HP_{95}	—	September 17, 2006	Kitt Peak	Spacewatch	·	2.4 km	MPC · JPL
718545	2017 JE	—	April 2, 2011	Mount Lemmon	Mount Lemmon Survey	·	3.8 km	MPC · JPL
718546	2017 JH	—	September 14, 2013	Haleakala	Pan-STARRS 1	·	2.4 km	MPC · JPL
718547	2017 JQ_{3}	—	January 19, 2005	Kitt Peak	Spacewatch	LIX	3.5 km	MPC · JPL
718548	2017 JL_{5}	—	January 8, 2016	Haleakala	Pan-STARRS 1	·	2.4 km	MPC · JPL
718549	2017 JR_{5}	—	January 31, 2016	Haleakala	Pan-STARRS 1	·	2.4 km	MPC · JPL
718550	2017 JS_{5}	—	January 3, 2016	Haleakala	Pan-STARRS 1	·	2.9 km	MPC · JPL
718551	2017 JO_{7}	—	May 1, 2017	Mount Lemmon	Mount Lemmon Survey	·	2.7 km	MPC · JPL
718552	2017 JE_{13}	—	January 4, 2016	Haleakala	Pan-STARRS 1	·	940 m	MPC · JPL
718553	2017 KQ	—	October 27, 2008	Kitt Peak	Spacewatch	·	2.3 km	MPC · JPL
718554	2017 KE_{2}	—	March 19, 2007	Mount Lemmon	Mount Lemmon Survey	·	660 m	MPC · JPL
718555	2017 KR_{3}	—	June 30, 1998	Kitt Peak	Spacewatch	·	580 m	MPC · JPL
718556	2017 KS_{5}	—	January 22, 2013	Mount Lemmon	Mount Lemmon Survey	(2076)	540 m	MPC · JPL
718557	2017 KO_{6}	—	September 29, 2005	Kitt Peak	Spacewatch	·	500 m	MPC · JPL
718558	2017 KE_{7}	—	April 3, 2011	Haleakala	Pan-STARRS 1	(1298)	2.4 km	MPC · JPL
718559	2017 KH_{7}	—	October 22, 2003	Kitt Peak	Spacewatch	EOS	1.9 km	MPC · JPL
718560	2017 KG_{8}	—	June 17, 2007	Siding Spring	SSS	·	3.3 km	MPC · JPL
718561	2017 KT_{8}	—	April 25, 2017	Haleakala	Pan-STARRS 1	·	660 m	MPC · JPL
718562	2017 KE_{9}	—	May 6, 2000	Kitt Peak	Spacewatch	·	1.2 km	MPC · JPL
718563	2017 KL_{9}	—	April 27, 2017	Haleakala	Pan-STARRS 1	·	2.4 km	MPC · JPL
718564	2017 KQ_{9}	—	May 2, 2006	Kitt Peak	Spacewatch	·	2.7 km	MPC · JPL
718565	2017 KT_{10}	—	January 8, 2011	Mount Lemmon	Mount Lemmon Survey	·	2.2 km	MPC · JPL
718566	2017 KE_{11}	—	February 5, 2016	Haleakala	Pan-STARRS 1	·	2.3 km	MPC · JPL
718567	2017 KR_{11}	—	April 24, 2006	Kitt Peak	Spacewatch	THM	2.0 km	MPC · JPL
718568	2017 KZ_{11}	—	September 14, 2013	Haleakala	Pan-STARRS 1	·	2.4 km	MPC · JPL
718569	2017 KT_{16}	—	March 7, 2016	Haleakala	Pan-STARRS 1	·	2.8 km	MPC · JPL
718570	2017 KV_{16}	—	February 12, 2016	Kitt Peak	Spacewatch	·	2.7 km	MPC · JPL
718571	2017 KH_{19}	—	July 16, 2013	Haleakala	Pan-STARRS 1	·	1.9 km	MPC · JPL
718572	2017 KW_{19}	—	November 20, 2008	Kitt Peak	Spacewatch	(43176)	3.0 km	MPC · JPL
718573	2017 KD_{20}	—	October 28, 2014	Mount Lemmon	Mount Lemmon Survey	·	1.4 km	MPC · JPL
718574	2017 KP_{22}	—	May 19, 2017	Haleakala	Pan-STARRS 1	·	1.2 km	MPC · JPL
718575	2017 KB_{23}	—	March 6, 2016	Haleakala	Pan-STARRS 1	·	1.6 km	MPC · JPL
718576	2017 KM_{30}	—	May 4, 2017	Haleakala	Pan-STARRS 1	·	2.2 km	MPC · JPL
718577	2017 KN_{32}	—	November 21, 2009	Mount Lemmon	Mount Lemmon Survey	·	3.3 km	MPC · JPL
718578	2017 KD_{33}	—	February 25, 2011	Kitt Peak	Spacewatch	·	2.8 km	MPC · JPL
718579	2017 KS_{35}	—	May 5, 2011	Charleston	R. Holmes	·	3.9 km	MPC · JPL
718580	2017 KD_{45}	—	May 27, 2017	ESA OGS	ESA OGS	·	660 m	MPC · JPL
718581	2017 MB_{15}	—	June 29, 2017	Mount Lemmon	Mount Lemmon Survey	·	720 m	MPC · JPL
718582	2017 MD_{15}	—	June 24, 2017	Haleakala	Pan-STARRS 1	·	670 m	MPC · JPL
718583	2017 MJ_{16}	—	June 25, 2017	Haleakala	Pan-STARRS 1	NYS	700 m	MPC · JPL
718584	2017 MB_{17}	—	June 24, 2017	Haleakala	Pan-STARRS 1	HNS	840 m	MPC · JPL
718585	2017 MF_{18}	—	June 19, 2017	Mount Lemmon	Mount Lemmon Survey	·	1.6 km	MPC · JPL
718586	2017 MR_{24}	—	June 24, 2017	Haleakala	Pan-STARRS 1	·	2.0 km	MPC · JPL
718587	2017 NH_{4}	—	August 30, 2000	Kitt Peak	Spacewatch	·	700 m	MPC · JPL
718588	2017 NO_{4}	—	September 2, 2010	Mount Lemmon	Mount Lemmon Survey	·	790 m	MPC · JPL
718589	2017 NG_{6}	—	May 21, 2017	Haleakala	Pan-STARRS 1	·	640 m	MPC · JPL
718590	2017 NG_{15}	—	July 1, 2017	Mount Lemmon	Mount Lemmon Survey	·	620 m	MPC · JPL
718591	2017 NH_{15}	—	July 15, 2017	Haleakala	Pan-STARRS 1	EOS	1.5 km	MPC · JPL
718592	2017 NS_{16}	—	June 24, 2017	Haleakala	Pan-STARRS 1	(2076)	630 m	MPC · JPL
718593	2017 NS_{17}	—	April 2, 2016	Haleakala	Pan-STARRS 1	·	1.9 km	MPC · JPL
718594	2017 OG	—	September 23, 2003	Palomar	NEAT	·	610 m	MPC · JPL
718595	2017 OG_{2}	—	October 3, 2010	Catalina	CSS	·	960 m	MPC · JPL
718596	2017 OC_{5}	—	August 30, 2014	Haleakala	Pan-STARRS 1	V	540 m	MPC · JPL
718597	2017 OO_{5}	—	January 16, 2009	Kitt Peak	Spacewatch	EOS	1.7 km	MPC · JPL
718598	2017 OP_{6}	—	March 26, 2009	Kitt Peak	Spacewatch	·	940 m	MPC · JPL
718599	2017 OG_{8}	—	July 14, 2013	Haleakala	Pan-STARRS 1	·	1.0 km	MPC · JPL
718600	2017 OO_{8}	—	October 10, 2012	Mount Lemmon	Mount Lemmon Survey	·	2.7 km	MPC · JPL

== 718601–718700 ==
back to top

Designation			Discovery			Properties		Ref
Permanent	Provisional	Named after	Date	Site	Discoverer(s)	Category	Diam.	Ref
718601	2017 OF_{9}	—	June 20, 2010	Mount Lemmon	Mount Lemmon Survey	·	600 m	MPC · JPL
718602	2017 OV_{13}	—	June 20, 2010	Mount Lemmon	Mount Lemmon Survey	·	760 m	MPC · JPL
718603	2017 OL_{20}	—	August 31, 2014	Haleakala	Pan-STARRS 1	·	590 m	MPC · JPL
718604	2017 OZ_{20}	—	June 21, 2017	Haleakala	Pan-STARRS 1	·	620 m	MPC · JPL
718605	2017 OT_{27}	—	June 3, 2010	Nogales	M. Schwartz, P. R. Holvorcem	·	790 m	MPC · JPL
718606	2017 OW_{32}	—	November 7, 2007	Mount Lemmon	Mount Lemmon Survey	·	780 m	MPC · JPL
718607	2017 OO_{34}	—	November 3, 2000	Socorro	LINEAR	·	740 m	MPC · JPL
718608	2017 OX_{39}	—	December 11, 2014	Mount Lemmon	Mount Lemmon Survey	·	720 m	MPC · JPL
718609	2017 OF_{41}	—	September 2, 2007	Catalina	CSS	·	750 m	MPC · JPL
718610	2017 OE_{45}	—	July 27, 2017	Haleakala	Pan-STARRS 1	·	750 m	MPC · JPL
718611	2017 OU_{45}	—	June 16, 2012	Nogales	M. Schwartz, P. R. Holvorcem	·	1.9 km	MPC · JPL
718612	2017 OS_{50}	—	February 13, 2012	Haleakala	Pan-STARRS 1	·	1.3 km	MPC · JPL
718613	2017 OC_{53}	—	August 25, 2014	Haleakala	Pan-STARRS 1	·	600 m	MPC · JPL
718614	2017 OO_{53}	—	March 28, 2016	Cerro Tololo	DECam	V	380 m	MPC · JPL
718615	2017 OF_{54}	—	May 17, 2013	Mount Lemmon	Mount Lemmon Survey	·	830 m	MPC · JPL
718616	2017 OD_{57}	—	February 17, 2010	Kitt Peak	Spacewatch	·	2.1 km	MPC · JPL
718617	2017 OP_{57}	—	September 26, 2003	Apache Point	SDSS Collaboration	·	790 m	MPC · JPL
718618	2017 OY_{61}	—	September 15, 2010	Kitt Peak	Spacewatch	·	1 km	MPC · JPL
718619	2017 OD_{65}	—	October 24, 2011	Haleakala	Pan-STARRS 1	·	640 m	MPC · JPL
718620	2017 OJ_{89}	—	January 14, 2015	Haleakala	Pan-STARRS 1	·	860 m	MPC · JPL
718621	2017 OO_{90}	—	July 30, 2017	Haleakala	Pan-STARRS 1	·	910 m	MPC · JPL
718622	2017 OY_{90}	—	July 24, 2017	Haleakala	Pan-STARRS 1	V	580 m	MPC · JPL
718623	2017 OH_{91}	—	July 30, 2017	Haleakala	Pan-STARRS 1	MAS	590 m	MPC · JPL
718624	2017 OR_{95}	—	July 24, 2017	Haleakala	Pan-STARRS 1	·	900 m	MPC · JPL
718625	2017 OT_{95}	—	July 25, 2017	Haleakala	Pan-STARRS 1	·	670 m	MPC · JPL
718626	2017 OY_{99}	—	July 25, 2017	Haleakala	Pan-STARRS 1	·	630 m	MPC · JPL
718627	2017 OT_{100}	—	July 27, 2017	Haleakala	Pan-STARRS 1	·	780 m	MPC · JPL
718628	2017 OX_{101}	—	July 22, 2017	ESA OGS	ESA OGS	·	570 m	MPC · JPL
718629 Wangzhenru	2017 OZ_{105}	Wangzhenru	July 21, 2017	XuYi	PMO NEO Survey Program	·	1.6 km	MPC · JPL
718630	2017 OZ_{117}	—	September 12, 2004	Kitt Peak	Spacewatch	·	1.3 km	MPC · JPL
718631	2017 OU_{118}	—	May 9, 2016	Mount Lemmon	Mount Lemmon Survey	·	940 m	MPC · JPL
718632	2017 OV_{118}	—	July 27, 2017	Haleakala	Pan-STARRS 1	V	470 m	MPC · JPL
718633	2017 ON_{131}	—	April 30, 2016	Haleakala	Pan-STARRS 1	(2076)	700 m	MPC · JPL
718634	2017 OS_{140}	—	July 26, 2017	Haleakala	Pan-STARRS 1	·	720 m	MPC · JPL
718635	2017 OE_{162}	—	July 26, 2017	Haleakala	Pan-STARRS 1	·	1.1 km	MPC · JPL
718636	2017 ON_{167}	—	July 25, 2017	Haleakala	Pan-STARRS 1	KOR	960 m	MPC · JPL
718637	2017 PR_{1}	—	October 2, 2013	Mount Lemmon	Mount Lemmon Survey	(12739)	1.2 km	MPC · JPL
718638	2017 PQ_{3}	—	January 19, 2015	Mount Lemmon	Mount Lemmon Survey	·	1.0 km	MPC · JPL
718639	2017 PK_{9}	—	April 8, 2006	Kitt Peak	Spacewatch	·	690 m	MPC · JPL
718640	2017 PE_{13}	—	May 8, 2013	Haleakala	Pan-STARRS 1	NYS	510 m	MPC · JPL
718641	2017 PH_{14}	—	December 6, 2013	Haleakala	Pan-STARRS 1	·	2.3 km	MPC · JPL
718642	2017 PP_{16}	—	September 13, 2007	Mount Lemmon	Mount Lemmon Survey	·	500 m	MPC · JPL
718643	2017 PB_{18}	—	January 17, 2015	Haleakala	Pan-STARRS 1	V	480 m	MPC · JPL
718644	2017 PM_{22}	—	August 8, 2013	Haleakala	Pan-STARRS 1	·	980 m	MPC · JPL
718645	2017 PP_{23}	—	January 10, 2003	Socorro	LINEAR	·	2.7 km	MPC · JPL
718646	2017 PQ_{28}	—	November 5, 1999	Kitt Peak	Spacewatch	MAS	500 m	MPC · JPL
718647	2017 PX_{32}	—	November 9, 2013	Haleakala	Pan-STARRS 1	·	1.7 km	MPC · JPL
718648	2017 PF_{35}	—	September 5, 2008	Kitt Peak	Spacewatch	·	1.7 km	MPC · JPL
718649	2017 PB_{36}	—	November 9, 2013	Mount Lemmon	Mount Lemmon Survey	·	1.2 km	MPC · JPL
718650	2017 PD_{39}	—	July 8, 2010	Kitt Peak	Spacewatch	·	510 m	MPC · JPL
718651	2017 PY_{40}	—	July 24, 2017	Haleakala	Pan-STARRS 1	·	1.2 km	MPC · JPL
718652	2017 PP_{46}	—	September 1, 2013	Piszkés-tető	K. Sárneczky, T. Csörgei	·	710 m	MPC · JPL
718653	2017 PO_{53}	—	August 4, 2017	Haleakala	Pan-STARRS 1	·	830 m	MPC · JPL
718654	2017 PU_{55}	—	August 3, 2017	Haleakala	Pan-STARRS 1	·	1.8 km	MPC · JPL
718655	2017 PW_{57}	—	August 3, 2017	Haleakala	Pan-STARRS 1	·	770 m	MPC · JPL
718656	2017 PY_{57}	—	August 15, 2017	Haleakala	Pan-STARRS 1	·	2.6 km	MPC · JPL
718657	2017 PA_{62}	—	January 20, 2015	Haleakala	Pan-STARRS 1	KOR	1.2 km	MPC · JPL
718658	2017 PT_{70}	—	August 1, 2017	Haleakala	Pan-STARRS 1	·	650 m	MPC · JPL
718659	2017 QD_{4}	—	December 20, 2014	Kitt Peak	Spacewatch	·	1.1 km	MPC · JPL
718660	2017 QE_{5}	—	November 22, 2014	Mount Lemmon	Mount Lemmon Survey	·	790 m	MPC · JPL
718661	2017 QW_{5}	—	January 20, 2012	Mount Lemmon	Mount Lemmon Survey	·	1.0 km	MPC · JPL
718662	2017 QJ_{6}	—	April 21, 2009	Mount Lemmon	Mount Lemmon Survey	·	1.0 km	MPC · JPL
718663	2017 QF_{7}	—	September 28, 2003	Kitt Peak	Spacewatch	·	670 m	MPC · JPL
718664	2017 QQ_{7}	—	September 11, 2007	Kitt Peak	Spacewatch	·	560 m	MPC · JPL
718665	2017 QD_{8}	—	September 25, 2014	Mount Lemmon	Mount Lemmon Survey	·	750 m	MPC · JPL
718666	2017 QN_{8}	—	August 13, 2010	Kitt Peak	Spacewatch	·	680 m	MPC · JPL
718667	2017 QA_{19}	—	March 17, 2009	Kitt Peak	Spacewatch	·	1.2 km	MPC · JPL
718668	2017 QF_{24}	—	September 22, 2003	Anderson Mesa	LONEOS	·	780 m	MPC · JPL
718669	2017 QX_{24}	—	August 23, 2001	Anderson Mesa	LONEOS	·	590 m	MPC · JPL
718670	2017 QA_{29}	—	September 18, 2006	Kitt Peak	Spacewatch	·	1.0 km	MPC · JPL
718671	2017 QC_{29}	—	December 22, 2008	Mount Lemmon	Mount Lemmon Survey	EOS	1.8 km	MPC · JPL
718672	2017 QN_{30}	—	October 17, 2010	Mount Lemmon	Mount Lemmon Survey	V	570 m	MPC · JPL
718673	2017 QC_{41}	—	November 21, 2014	Haleakala	Pan-STARRS 1	·	630 m	MPC · JPL
718674	2017 QO_{48}	—	July 5, 2017	Haleakala	Pan-STARRS 1	·	900 m	MPC · JPL
718675	2017 QG_{53}	—	November 19, 2000	Socorro	LINEAR	·	740 m	MPC · JPL
718676	2017 QK_{53}	—	January 20, 2009	Kitt Peak	Spacewatch	·	2.4 km	MPC · JPL
718677	2017 QG_{54}	—	November 18, 2014	Mount Lemmon	Mount Lemmon Survey	·	850 m	MPC · JPL
718678	2017 QU_{55}	—	April 22, 2013	Haleakala	Pan-STARRS 1	(2076)	720 m	MPC · JPL
718679	2017 QP_{57}	—	January 15, 2005	Kitt Peak	Spacewatch	·	1.2 km	MPC · JPL
718680	2017 QS_{58}	—	November 10, 2010	Mount Lemmon	Mount Lemmon Survey	3:2	5.4 km	MPC · JPL
718681	2017 QY_{62}	—	September 18, 2003	Kitt Peak	Spacewatch	·	680 m	MPC · JPL
718682	2017 QJ_{64}	—	June 18, 2010	Mount Lemmon	Mount Lemmon Survey	·	590 m	MPC · JPL
718683	2017 QL_{65}	—	October 10, 2012	Mount Lemmon	Mount Lemmon Survey	·	2.4 km	MPC · JPL
718684	2017 QD_{66}	—	August 10, 2010	XuYi	PMO NEO Survey Program	·	700 m	MPC · JPL
718685	2017 QH_{91}	—	August 16, 2017	Haleakala	Pan-STARRS 1	·	770 m	MPC · JPL
718686	2017 QY_{91}	—	August 24, 2017	Haleakala	Pan-STARRS 1	KOR	1.1 km	MPC · JPL
718687	2017 QE_{95}	—	August 18, 2017	Haleakala	Pan-STARRS 1	·	770 m	MPC · JPL
718688	2017 QH_{95}	—	August 31, 2017	Haleakala	Pan-STARRS 1	NYS	760 m	MPC · JPL
718689	2017 QD_{99}	—	September 14, 2013	Mount Lemmon	Mount Lemmon Survey	·	990 m	MPC · JPL
718690	2017 QU_{101}	—	August 18, 2017	Haleakala	Pan-STARRS 1	KOR	1.1 km	MPC · JPL
718691	2017 QO_{113}	—	August 16, 2017	Haleakala	Pan-STARRS 1	·	1.2 km	MPC · JPL
718692	2017 QK_{114}	—	May 1, 2016	Cerro Tololo	DECam	·	880 m	MPC · JPL
718693	2017 QE_{124}	—	August 30, 2017	Mount Lemmon	Mount Lemmon Survey	·	1.8 km	MPC · JPL
718694	2017 QU_{135}	—	August 24, 2017	Haleakala	Pan-STARRS 1	V	450 m	MPC · JPL
718695	2017 QU_{145}	—	August 18, 2017	Haleakala	Pan-STARRS 1	·	1.3 km	MPC · JPL
718696	2017 QT_{149}	—	August 16, 2017	Haleakala	Pan-STARRS 1	·	1.4 km	MPC · JPL
718697	2017 RR_{5}	—	September 16, 2003	Kitt Peak	Spacewatch	·	580 m	MPC · JPL
718698	2017 RG_{6}	—	June 10, 2017	Haleakala	Pan-STARRS 1	PHO	720 m	MPC · JPL
718699	2017 RW_{6}	—	November 2, 2010	Mount Lemmon	Mount Lemmon Survey	·	890 m	MPC · JPL
718700	2017 RG_{9}	—	October 5, 2004	Kitt Peak	Spacewatch	·	1.2 km	MPC · JPL

== 718701–718800 ==
back to top

Designation			Discovery			Properties		Ref
Permanent	Provisional	Named after	Date	Site	Discoverer(s)	Category	Diam.	Ref
718701	2017 RL_{9}	—	February 21, 2009	Mount Lemmon	Mount Lemmon Survey	·	630 m	MPC · JPL
718702	2017 RP_{10}	—	October 4, 2007	Mount Lemmon	Mount Lemmon Survey	·	1.6 km	MPC · JPL
718703	2017 RE_{23}	—	October 6, 1999	Socorro	LINEAR	·	890 m	MPC · JPL
718704	2017 RM_{29}	—	August 3, 2017	Haleakala	Pan-STARRS 1	·	1.2 km	MPC · JPL
718705	2017 RX_{31}	—	February 19, 2009	Kitt Peak	Spacewatch	·	840 m	MPC · JPL
718706	2017 RB_{33}	—	April 18, 2015	Mount Lemmon	Mount Lemmon Survey	VER	2.5 km	MPC · JPL
718707	2017 RX_{36}	—	January 25, 2015	Haleakala	Pan-STARRS 1	·	1.6 km	MPC · JPL
718708	2017 RZ_{36}	—	September 29, 2010	Kitt Peak	Spacewatch	V	510 m	MPC · JPL
718709	2017 RC_{38}	—	August 14, 2013	Haleakala	Pan-STARRS 1	·	970 m	MPC · JPL
718710	2017 RG_{42}	—	August 4, 2013	Haleakala	Pan-STARRS 1	·	970 m	MPC · JPL
718711	2017 RB_{47}	—	September 30, 2006	Kitt Peak	Spacewatch	·	2.4 km	MPC · JPL
718712	2017 RC_{49}	—	September 14, 2017	Haleakala	Pan-STARRS 1	·	790 m	MPC · JPL
718713	2017 RY_{50}	—	November 20, 2014	Mount Lemmon	Mount Lemmon Survey	·	1.0 km	MPC · JPL
718714	2017 RT_{51}	—	September 14, 2017	Haleakala	Pan-STARRS 1	·	2.0 km	MPC · JPL
718715	2017 RM_{52}	—	February 21, 2009	Kitt Peak	Spacewatch	·	550 m	MPC · JPL
718716	2017 RF_{53}	—	February 16, 2015	Haleakala	Pan-STARRS 1	EOS	1.5 km	MPC · JPL
718717	2017 RG_{55}	—	November 2, 2013	Mount Lemmon	Mount Lemmon Survey	·	1.2 km	MPC · JPL
718718	2017 RF_{59}	—	September 18, 2003	Palomar	NEAT	·	640 m	MPC · JPL
718719	2017 RV_{61}	—	March 20, 2010	Kitt Peak	Spacewatch	·	2.3 km	MPC · JPL
718720	2017 RY_{68}	—	September 17, 2003	Kitt Peak	Spacewatch	·	700 m	MPC · JPL
718721	2017 RR_{70}	—	October 14, 2009	Mount Lemmon	Mount Lemmon Survey	·	770 m	MPC · JPL
718722	2017 RC_{83}	—	February 27, 2015	Haleakala	Pan-STARRS 1	KOR	1.2 km	MPC · JPL
718723	2017 RR_{84}	—	March 10, 2016	Haleakala	Pan-STARRS 1	·	710 m	MPC · JPL
718724	2017 RQ_{87}	—	August 1, 2009	Kitt Peak	Spacewatch	·	970 m	MPC · JPL
718725	2017 RT_{89}	—	August 31, 2017	Haleakala	Pan-STARRS 1	PAD	1.2 km	MPC · JPL
718726	2017 RJ_{92}	—	April 1, 2016	Haleakala	Pan-STARRS 1	·	640 m	MPC · JPL
718727	2017 RT_{98}	—	September 15, 2017	Haleakala	Pan-STARRS 1	AGN	840 m	MPC · JPL
718728	2017 RH_{120}	—	March 28, 2016	Cerro Tololo	DECam	·	810 m	MPC · JPL
718729	2017 RP_{120}	—	September 14, 2017	Haleakala	Pan-STARRS 1	·	1.0 km	MPC · JPL
718730	2017 RT_{121}	—	September 14, 2017	Haleakala	Pan-STARRS 1	MAS	540 m	MPC · JPL
718731	2017 RA_{124}	—	September 15, 2017	Haleakala	Pan-STARRS 1	·	810 m	MPC · JPL
718732	2017 RJ_{124}	—	September 13, 2017	Kitt Peak	Spacewatch	·	1.4 km	MPC · JPL
718733	2017 RP_{135}	—	September 7, 2008	Mount Lemmon	Mount Lemmon Survey	·	1.1 km	MPC · JPL
718734	2017 RC_{139}	—	September 12, 2017	Haleakala	Pan-STARRS 1	·	800 m	MPC · JPL
718735	2017 RE_{141}	—	September 1, 2017	Haleakala	Pan-STARRS 1	·	1.4 km	MPC · JPL
718736	2017 RO_{155}	—	September 14, 2017	Haleakala	Pan-STARRS 1	·	1.2 km	MPC · JPL
718737	2017 SL_{1}	—	March 13, 2015	Mount Lemmon	Mount Lemmon Survey	AGN	900 m	MPC · JPL
718738	2017 SA_{9}	—	February 11, 2004	Kitt Peak	Spacewatch	·	1.1 km	MPC · JPL
718739	2017 SF_{18}	—	March 24, 2009	Mount Lemmon	Mount Lemmon Survey	·	940 m	MPC · JPL
718740	2017 SY_{18}	—	October 21, 2006	Mount Lemmon	Mount Lemmon Survey	·	1.5 km	MPC · JPL
718741	2017 SV_{23}	—	December 31, 2007	Kitt Peak	Spacewatch	·	1.1 km	MPC · JPL
718742	2017 SB_{26}	—	July 2, 2013	Haleakala	Pan-STARRS 1	·	760 m	MPC · JPL
718743	2017 SN_{26}	—	October 2, 2013	Haleakala	Pan-STARRS 1	·	950 m	MPC · JPL
718744	2017 SJ_{27}	—	September 15, 2017	Haleakala	Pan-STARRS 1	·	840 m	MPC · JPL
718745	2017 SG_{28}	—	March 3, 2009	Kitt Peak	Spacewatch	·	620 m	MPC · JPL
718746	2017 SZ_{28}	—	September 12, 2013	Catalina	CSS	PHO	900 m	MPC · JPL
718747	2017 SN_{36}	—	October 31, 2008	Catalina	CSS	·	1.7 km	MPC · JPL
718748	2017 SA_{49}	—	August 16, 2017	Haleakala	Pan-STARRS 1	·	2.0 km	MPC · JPL
718749	2017 SC_{49}	—	April 11, 2015	Mount Lemmon	Mount Lemmon Survey	3:2	4.3 km	MPC · JPL
718750	2017 SL_{51}	—	January 22, 2015	Haleakala	Pan-STARRS 1	·	1.1 km	MPC · JPL
718751	2017 SC_{52}	—	August 28, 2006	Kitt Peak	Spacewatch	·	2.6 km	MPC · JPL
718752	2017 SJ_{52}	—	October 18, 2012	Haleakala	Pan-STARRS 1	EOS	1.5 km	MPC · JPL
718753	2017 SZ_{53}	—	February 16, 2015	Haleakala	Pan-STARRS 1	EOS	1.5 km	MPC · JPL
718754	2017 SL_{56}	—	October 3, 2006	Mount Lemmon	Mount Lemmon Survey	·	1.3 km	MPC · JPL
718755	2017 SW_{61}	—	August 22, 2017	Haleakala	Pan-STARRS 1	·	1.3 km	MPC · JPL
718756	2017 SC_{62}	—	February 28, 2016	Mount Lemmon	Mount Lemmon Survey	·	880 m	MPC · JPL
718757	2017 SU_{62}	—	October 6, 2008	Mount Lemmon	Mount Lemmon Survey	·	1.7 km	MPC · JPL
718758	2017 SP_{63}	—	August 17, 2017	Haleakala	Pan-STARRS 1	·	740 m	MPC · JPL
718759	2017 SF_{67}	—	September 18, 2006	Kitt Peak	Spacewatch	·	2.4 km	MPC · JPL
718760	2017 SL_{67}	—	March 19, 2009	Mount Lemmon	Mount Lemmon Survey	·	470 m	MPC · JPL
718761	2017 SF_{69}	—	September 29, 2010	Mount Lemmon	Mount Lemmon Survey	·	780 m	MPC · JPL
718762	2017 SE_{70}	—	May 2, 2016	Haleakala	Pan-STARRS 1	·	2.1 km	MPC · JPL
718763	2017 SY_{70}	—	January 24, 2015	Haleakala	Pan-STARRS 1	·	900 m	MPC · JPL
718764	2017 SO_{71}	—	July 14, 2013	Haleakala	Pan-STARRS 1	NYS	920 m	MPC · JPL
718765	2017 SR_{72}	—	September 24, 2006	Kitt Peak	Spacewatch	·	920 m	MPC · JPL
718766	2017 SU_{72}	—	September 10, 2007	Mount Lemmon	Mount Lemmon Survey	KOR	1.2 km	MPC · JPL
718767	2017 SR_{75}	—	January 18, 2016	Haleakala	Pan-STARRS 1	·	970 m	MPC · JPL
718768	2017 SB_{79}	—	April 14, 2015	Mount Lemmon	Mount Lemmon Survey	·	1.6 km	MPC · JPL
718769	2017 SQ_{80}	—	November 29, 2000	Kitt Peak	Spacewatch	·	670 m	MPC · JPL
718770	2017 SJ_{81}	—	September 13, 2002	Palomar	NEAT	·	900 m	MPC · JPL
718771	2017 SD_{84}	—	August 13, 2005	Wrightwood	J. W. Young	·	900 m	MPC · JPL
718772	2017 SN_{86}	—	September 14, 2006	Catalina	CSS	MAS	570 m	MPC · JPL
718773	2017 SA_{87}	—	March 16, 2013	Mount Lemmon	Mount Lemmon Survey	·	710 m	MPC · JPL
718774	2017 SE_{89}	—	December 18, 2004	Mount Lemmon	Mount Lemmon Survey	·	690 m	MPC · JPL
718775	2017 SF_{89}	—	October 28, 2006	Mount Lemmon	Mount Lemmon Survey	·	960 m	MPC · JPL
718776	2017 SH_{97}	—	January 4, 2012	Mount Lemmon	Mount Lemmon Survey	·	650 m	MPC · JPL
718777	2017 SR_{97}	—	April 3, 2016	Haleakala	Pan-STARRS 1	·	910 m	MPC · JPL
718778	2017 SY_{97}	—	February 28, 2014	Haleakala	Pan-STARRS 1	3:2	4.5 km	MPC · JPL
718779	2017 SF_{100}	—	April 10, 2015	Kitt Peak	Spacewatch	·	2.4 km	MPC · JPL
718780	2017 SH_{100}	—	July 30, 2017	Haleakala	Pan-STARRS 1	ADE	1.3 km	MPC · JPL
718781	2017 SU_{100}	—	October 15, 2012	Haleakala	Pan-STARRS 1	·	1.6 km	MPC · JPL
718782	2017 SB_{106}	—	February 8, 2002	Kitt Peak	Spacewatch	·	630 m	MPC · JPL
718783	2017 SD_{109}	—	November 5, 2007	Mount Lemmon	Mount Lemmon Survey	·	570 m	MPC · JPL
718784	2017 SD_{113}	—	September 17, 1995	Kitt Peak	Spacewatch	·	2.2 km	MPC · JPL
718785	2017 SR_{115}	—	August 12, 2012	Haleakala	Pan-STARRS 1	·	1.8 km	MPC · JPL
718786	2017 SE_{118}	—	January 2, 2012	Mount Lemmon	Mount Lemmon Survey	·	660 m	MPC · JPL
718787	2017 SA_{121}	—	February 28, 2008	Mount Lemmon	Mount Lemmon Survey	MAS	620 m	MPC · JPL
718788	2017 SN_{121}	—	August 11, 2010	La Sagra	OAM	·	580 m	MPC · JPL
718789	2017 SD_{126}	—	July 4, 2013	Haleakala	Pan-STARRS 1	·	930 m	MPC · JPL
718790	2017 SX_{130}	—	October 9, 2010	Catalina	CSS	V	570 m	MPC · JPL
718791	2017 SS_{131}	—	November 17, 2014	Haleakala	Pan-STARRS 1	·	800 m	MPC · JPL
718792	2017 SV_{131}	—	October 11, 2010	Mount Lemmon	Mount Lemmon Survey	·	990 m	MPC · JPL
718793	2017 SD_{132}	—	August 10, 2010	Kitt Peak	Spacewatch	·	880 m	MPC · JPL
718794	2017 SO_{198}	—	September 24, 2017	Mount Lemmon	Mount Lemmon Survey	3:2	5.0 km	MPC · JPL
718795	2017 SA_{199}	—	September 19, 2017	Haleakala	Pan-STARRS 1	·	1.2 km	MPC · JPL
718796	2017 SK_{199}	—	September 17, 2017	Haleakala	Pan-STARRS 1	·	1.4 km	MPC · JPL
718797	2017 SY_{203}	—	September 17, 2017	Haleakala	Pan-STARRS 1	·	820 m	MPC · JPL
718798	2017 SP_{209}	—	September 18, 2017	Haleakala	Pan-STARRS 1	·	920 m	MPC · JPL
718799	2017 SY_{210}	—	September 24, 2017	Haleakala	Pan-STARRS 1	KON	1.8 km	MPC · JPL
718800	2017 SD_{218}	—	September 24, 2017	Haleakala	Pan-STARRS 1	·	2.1 km	MPC · JPL

== 718801–718900 ==
back to top

Designation			Discovery			Properties		Ref
Permanent	Provisional	Named after	Date	Site	Discoverer(s)	Category	Diam.	Ref
718801	2017 SH_{218}	—	February 16, 2015	Haleakala	Pan-STARRS 1	·	1.3 km	MPC · JPL
718802	2017 SJ_{218}	—	September 25, 2017	Haleakala	Pan-STARRS 1	·	1.1 km	MPC · JPL
718803	2017 SX_{218}	—	April 18, 2015	Cerro Tololo	DECam	·	1.1 km	MPC · JPL
718804	2017 SM_{219}	—	September 19, 2017	Haleakala	Pan-STARRS 1	·	1.9 km	MPC · JPL
718805	2017 ST_{224}	—	September 22, 2017	Haleakala	Pan-STARRS 1	·	1.6 km	MPC · JPL
718806	2017 SG_{226}	—	September 19, 2017	Haleakala	Pan-STARRS 1	·	1 km	MPC · JPL
718807	2017 SK_{250}	—	September 24, 2017	Haleakala	Pan-STARRS 1	·	2.4 km	MPC · JPL
718808	2017 SN_{278}	—	November 1, 2005	Mount Lemmon	Mount Lemmon Survey	·	890 m	MPC · JPL
718809	2017 SH_{301}	—	October 9, 2012	Haleakala	Pan-STARRS 1	·	1.3 km	MPC · JPL
718810	2017 SX_{308}	—	September 17, 2017	Haleakala	Pan-STARRS 1	·	1.2 km	MPC · JPL
718811	2017 SJ_{338}	—	September 22, 2017	Haleakala	Pan-STARRS 1	·	1.6 km	MPC · JPL
718812	2017 SN_{341}	—	September 22, 2017	Haleakala	Pan-STARRS 1	·	1.2 km	MPC · JPL
718813	2017 SW_{341}	—	September 19, 2017	Haleakala	Pan-STARRS 1	·	1.3 km	MPC · JPL
718814	2017 SA_{350}	—	September 19, 2017	Haleakala	Pan-STARRS 1	·	1.2 km	MPC · JPL
718815	2017 TU_{8}	—	March 5, 2002	Apache Point	SDSS	·	750 m	MPC · JPL
718816	2017 TD_{10}	—	December 11, 2013	Haleakala	Pan-STARRS 1	·	1.5 km	MPC · JPL
718817	2017 TC_{12}	—	October 3, 2013	Mount Lemmon	Mount Lemmon Survey	·	1.0 km	MPC · JPL
718818	2017 TO_{25}	—	April 19, 2015	Cerro Tololo	DECam	·	3.1 km	MPC · JPL
718819	2017 TF_{26}	—	October 15, 2017	Mount Lemmon	Mount Lemmon Survey	KOR	1.0 km	MPC · JPL
718820	2017 TB_{27}	—	April 18, 2015	Cerro Tololo	DECam	·	1.3 km	MPC · JPL
718821	2017 TC_{37}	—	October 14, 2017	Mount Lemmon	Mount Lemmon Survey	·	930 m	MPC · JPL
718822	2017 TU_{37}	—	October 15, 2017	Mount Lemmon	Mount Lemmon Survey	·	1.5 km	MPC · JPL
718823	2017 TP_{43}	—	October 15, 2017	Mount Lemmon	Mount Lemmon Survey	·	1 km	MPC · JPL
718824	2017 TK_{44}	—	October 15, 2017	Mount Lemmon	Mount Lemmon Survey	·	990 m	MPC · JPL
718825	2017 TH_{45}	—	October 14, 2017	Mount Lemmon	Mount Lemmon Survey	·	740 m	MPC · JPL
718826	2017 UW	—	June 19, 2017	Mount Lemmon	Mount Lemmon Survey	·	720 m	MPC · JPL
718827	2017 UR_{3}	—	February 7, 2008	Kitt Peak	Spacewatch	V	550 m	MPC · JPL
718828	2017 UR_{8}	—	November 10, 2010	Kitt Peak	Spacewatch	·	800 m	MPC · JPL
718829	2017 UX_{12}	—	September 14, 2013	Mount Lemmon	Mount Lemmon Survey	BRG	1.1 km	MPC · JPL
718830	2017 UP_{14}	—	February 25, 2006	Kitt Peak	Spacewatch	·	680 m	MPC · JPL
718831	2017 UY_{17}	—	August 28, 2006	Kitt Peak	Spacewatch	·	750 m	MPC · JPL
718832	2017 UC_{19}	—	May 24, 2006	Mount Lemmon	Mount Lemmon Survey	·	790 m	MPC · JPL
718833	2017 UH_{21}	—	April 22, 2009	Mount Lemmon	Mount Lemmon Survey	·	820 m	MPC · JPL
718834	2017 UX_{23}	—	November 19, 2003	Kitt Peak	Spacewatch	·	960 m	MPC · JPL
718835	2017 UG_{26}	—	May 22, 2015	Cerro Tololo	DECam	3:2	3.9 km	MPC · JPL
718836	2017 UE_{28}	—	August 9, 2013	Catalina	CSS	MAS	630 m	MPC · JPL
718837	2017 UE_{30}	—	October 5, 2014	Mount Lemmon	Mount Lemmon Survey	·	620 m	MPC · JPL
718838	2017 UW_{32}	—	September 22, 2003	Kitt Peak	Spacewatch	·	680 m	MPC · JPL
718839	2017 UH_{35}	—	December 3, 2005	Mauna Kea	A. Boattini	·	740 m	MPC · JPL
718840	2017 UW_{35}	—	October 25, 2008	Catalina	CSS	·	1.7 km	MPC · JPL
718841	2017 UW_{50}	—	September 30, 2006	Mount Lemmon	Mount Lemmon Survey	·	860 m	MPC · JPL
718842	2017 UN_{59}	—	October 28, 2017	Haleakala	Pan-STARRS 1	H	420 m	MPC · JPL
718843	2017 UP_{92}	—	February 10, 2008	Mount Lemmon	Mount Lemmon Survey	·	530 m	MPC · JPL
718844	2017 UY_{92}	—	April 18, 2015	Cerro Tololo	DECam	AGN	840 m	MPC · JPL
718845	2017 UJ_{93}	—	October 27, 2017	Haleakala	Pan-STARRS 1	·	1.7 km	MPC · JPL
718846	2017 UX_{93}	—	October 20, 2017	Mount Lemmon	Mount Lemmon Survey	·	1.4 km	MPC · JPL
718847	2017 UB_{94}	—	October 28, 2017	Haleakala	Pan-STARRS 1	·	1.6 km	MPC · JPL
718848	2017 UJ_{95}	—	October 28, 2017	Haleakala	Pan-STARRS 1	·	940 m	MPC · JPL
718849	2017 UZ_{96}	—	October 16, 2017	Mount Lemmon	Mount Lemmon Survey	·	960 m	MPC · JPL
718850	2017 UP_{98}	—	April 18, 2015	Cerro Tololo	DECam	HOF	1.8 km	MPC · JPL
718851	2017 UH_{100}	—	April 18, 2015	Cerro Tololo	DECam	·	1.4 km	MPC · JPL
718852	2017 UN_{101}	—	October 29, 2017	Haleakala	Pan-STARRS 1	·	950 m	MPC · JPL
718853	2017 UR_{102}	—	October 30, 2017	Haleakala	Pan-STARRS 1	·	1.5 km	MPC · JPL
718854	2017 UP_{105}	—	October 28, 2017	Mount Lemmon	Mount Lemmon Survey	·	1.2 km	MPC · JPL
718855	2017 UJ_{108}	—	October 30, 2017	Haleakala	Pan-STARRS 1	·	1.1 km	MPC · JPL
718856	2017 UP_{108}	—	October 28, 2017	Haleakala	Pan-STARRS 1	·	860 m	MPC · JPL
718857	2017 UD_{141}	—	October 19, 2017	Haleakala	Pan-STARRS 1	PHO	760 m	MPC · JPL
718858	2017 UP_{141}	—	November 6, 2012	Kitt Peak	Spacewatch	·	1.6 km	MPC · JPL
718859	2017 UB_{143}	—	October 30, 2017	Haleakala	Pan-STARRS 1	·	810 m	MPC · JPL
718860	2017 UF_{143}	—	October 22, 2017	Mount Lemmon	Mount Lemmon Survey	·	1.4 km	MPC · JPL
718861	2017 UP_{157}	—	October 28, 2017	Haleakala	Pan-STARRS 1	EUN	960 m	MPC · JPL
718862	2017 UO_{162}	—	October 28, 2017	Kitt Peak	CSS	·	990 m	MPC · JPL
718863 Zhouwenjie	2017 UL_{165}	Zhouwenjie	August 31, 2017	Xingming	X. Liao, X. Gao	·	1.1 km	MPC · JPL
718864	2017 UZ_{167}	—	October 29, 2017	Haleakala	Pan-STARRS 1	·	990 m	MPC · JPL
718865	2017 UH_{181}	—	March 22, 2015	Haleakala	Pan-STARRS 1	EUN	840 m	MPC · JPL
718866	2017 UJ_{203}	—	December 12, 2012	Mount Lemmon	Mount Lemmon Survey	EOS	1.4 km	MPC · JPL
718867	2017 VM_{11}	—	October 2, 2006	Mount Lemmon	Mount Lemmon Survey	·	910 m	MPC · JPL
718868	2017 VV_{15}	—	August 6, 2012	Haleakala	Pan-STARRS 1	·	1.8 km	MPC · JPL
718869	2017 VJ_{18}	—	August 13, 2013	Kitt Peak	Spacewatch	NYS	920 m	MPC · JPL
718870	2017 VN_{22}	—	September 25, 2012	Mount Lemmon	Mount Lemmon Survey	·	1.6 km	MPC · JPL
718871	2017 VV_{22}	—	February 9, 2005	Mount Lemmon	Mount Lemmon Survey	·	850 m	MPC · JPL
718872	2017 VS_{25}	—	April 5, 2014	Haleakala	Pan-STARRS 1	·	2.8 km	MPC · JPL
718873	2017 VQ_{31}	—	November 22, 2002	Palomar	NEAT	PHO	700 m	MPC · JPL
718874	2017 VK_{32}	—	September 24, 2017	Haleakala	Pan-STARRS 1	·	610 m	MPC · JPL
718875	2017 VT_{32}	—	December 15, 2006	Kitt Peak	Spacewatch	·	1.2 km	MPC · JPL
718876	2017 VC_{40}	—	November 13, 2017	Haleakala	Pan-STARRS 1	HNS	920 m	MPC · JPL
718877	2017 VH_{41}	—	November 15, 2017	Mount Lemmon	Mount Lemmon Survey	·	820 m	MPC · JPL
718878	2017 VE_{42}	—	November 14, 2017	Mount Lemmon	Mount Lemmon Survey	H	400 m	MPC · JPL
718879	2017 VC_{43}	—	November 10, 2017	Haleakala	Pan-STARRS 1	HOF	1.8 km	MPC · JPL
718880	2017 VJ_{47}	—	November 15, 2017	Mount Lemmon	Mount Lemmon Survey	·	840 m	MPC · JPL
718881	2017 VN_{50}	—	November 10, 2017	Kitt Peak	Spacewatch	KOR	920 m	MPC · JPL
718882	2017 VO_{50}	—	November 10, 2017	Kitt Peak	Spacewatch	·	1.4 km	MPC · JPL
718883	2017 VQ_{50}	—	October 24, 2003	Kitt Peak	Spacewatch	·	1.2 km	MPC · JPL
718884	2017 VL_{57}	—	November 15, 2017	ESA OGS	ESA OGS	·	1.0 km	MPC · JPL
718885	2017 VV_{57}	—	November 13, 2017	Haleakala	Pan-STARRS 1	·	1.1 km	MPC · JPL
718886	2017 VX_{58}	—	March 29, 2006	Kitt Peak	Spacewatch	·	1.1 km	MPC · JPL
718887	2017 WV_{4}	—	March 24, 2012	Mount Lemmon	Mount Lemmon Survey	·	1.2 km	MPC · JPL
718888	2017 WR_{9}	—	September 12, 2013	Catalina	CSS	·	1.3 km	MPC · JPL
718889	2017 WL_{18}	—	January 10, 2003	Kitt Peak	Spacewatch	NYS	930 m	MPC · JPL
718890	2017 WY_{20}	—	February 16, 2015	Haleakala	Pan-STARRS 1	·	1.3 km	MPC · JPL
718891	2017 WN_{21}	—	September 18, 2009	Mount Lemmon	Mount Lemmon Survey	MAS	600 m	MPC · JPL
718892	2017 WS_{22}	—	January 10, 2007	Mount Lemmon	Mount Lemmon Survey	·	1.0 km	MPC · JPL
718893	2017 WL_{24}	—	November 27, 2006	Mount Lemmon	Mount Lemmon Survey	NYS	990 m	MPC · JPL
718894	2017 WB_{27}	—	March 17, 2015	Haleakala	Pan-STARRS 1	(5)	1.3 km	MPC · JPL
718895	2017 WO_{43}	—	November 22, 2017	Haleakala	Pan-STARRS 1	·	2.2 km	MPC · JPL
718896	2017 WB_{45}	—	April 19, 2015	Cerro Tololo	DECam	·	1.2 km	MPC · JPL
718897	2017 WF_{46}	—	August 14, 2012	Haleakala	Pan-STARRS 1	·	1.5 km	MPC · JPL
718898	2017 WV_{49}	—	November 16, 2017	Mount Lemmon	Mount Lemmon Survey	·	1.4 km	MPC · JPL
718899	2017 WK_{51}	—	November 17, 2017	Haleakala	Pan-STARRS 1	·	470 m	MPC · JPL
718900	2017 WO_{52}	—	November 21, 2017	Haleakala	Pan-STARRS 1	·	950 m	MPC · JPL

== 718901–719000 ==
back to top

Designation			Discovery			Properties		Ref
Permanent	Provisional	Named after	Date	Site	Discoverer(s)	Category	Diam.	Ref
718901	2017 WU_{60}	—	August 14, 2012	Haleakala	Pan-STARRS 1	·	1.3 km	MPC · JPL
718902	2017 WA_{67}	—	April 21, 2015	Cerro Tololo	DECam	·	1.3 km	MPC · JPL
718903	2017 WG_{68}	—	November 16, 2017	Mount Lemmon	Mount Lemmon Survey	·	1.3 km	MPC · JPL
718904	2017 WR_{69}	—	May 20, 2015	Cerro Tololo	DECam	KOR	960 m	MPC · JPL
718905	2017 WX_{86}	—	November 21, 2017	Haleakala	Pan-STARRS 1	·	1.3 km	MPC · JPL
718906	2017 WW_{92}	—	November 21, 2017	Haleakala	Pan-STARRS 1	·	2.2 km	MPC · JPL
718907	2017 XY_{4}	—	October 30, 2010	Mount Lemmon	Mount Lemmon Survey	·	670 m	MPC · JPL
718908	2017 XD_{5}	—	December 3, 2013	Mount Lemmon	Mount Lemmon Survey	·	1.3 km	MPC · JPL
718909	2017 XG_{7}	—	March 10, 2011	Mount Lemmon	Mount Lemmon Survey	·	980 m	MPC · JPL
718910	2017 XT_{7}	—	February 5, 2011	Haleakala	Pan-STARRS 1	V	560 m	MPC · JPL
718911	2017 XX_{7}	—	March 25, 2011	Haleakala	Pan-STARRS 1	·	1.0 km	MPC · JPL
718912	2017 XQ_{8}	—	September 22, 2003	Kitt Peak	Spacewatch	·	630 m	MPC · JPL
718913	2017 XY_{12}	—	November 15, 2006	Kitt Peak	Spacewatch	THM	1.8 km	MPC · JPL
718914	2017 XD_{15}	—	October 20, 2017	Mount Lemmon	Mount Lemmon Survey	EUN	1.0 km	MPC · JPL
718915	2017 XH_{15}	—	March 20, 2015	Haleakala	Pan-STARRS 1	·	1.1 km	MPC · JPL
718916	2017 XG_{17}	—	October 9, 2012	Mount Lemmon	Mount Lemmon Survey	HOF	2.0 km	MPC · JPL
718917	2017 XY_{19}	—	November 14, 2017	Mount Lemmon	Mount Lemmon Survey	·	1.2 km	MPC · JPL
718918	2017 XT_{28}	—	October 27, 2017	Mount Lemmon	Mount Lemmon Survey	·	1.4 km	MPC · JPL
718919	2017 XX_{30}	—	November 12, 2010	Mount Lemmon	Mount Lemmon Survey	·	690 m	MPC · JPL
718920	2017 XP_{31}	—	May 21, 2015	Haleakala	Pan-STARRS 1	·	1.3 km	MPC · JPL
718921	2017 XO_{33}	—	August 8, 2016	Haleakala	Pan-STARRS 1	·	1.2 km	MPC · JPL
718922	2017 XQ_{35}	—	April 25, 2015	Haleakala	Pan-STARRS 1	·	2.3 km	MPC · JPL
718923	2017 XJ_{37}	—	November 19, 2006	Kitt Peak	Spacewatch	NYS	980 m	MPC · JPL
718924	2017 XL_{38}	—	September 15, 2007	Kitt Peak	Spacewatch	·	1.4 km	MPC · JPL
718925	2017 XJ_{40}	—	November 17, 2009	Kitt Peak	Spacewatch	·	860 m	MPC · JPL
718926	2017 XL_{40}	—	September 30, 2005	Mauna Kea	A. Boattini	·	1.1 km	MPC · JPL
718927	2017 XO_{43}	—	October 4, 2007	Kitt Peak	Spacewatch	·	480 m	MPC · JPL
718928	2017 XY_{45}	—	January 22, 2015	Haleakala	Pan-STARRS 1	·	960 m	MPC · JPL
718929	2017 XJ_{46}	—	May 20, 2015	Cerro Tololo	DECam	KOR	960 m	MPC · JPL
718930	2017 XB_{49}	—	February 21, 2007	Mount Lemmon	Mount Lemmon Survey	·	1.0 km	MPC · JPL
718931	2017 XR_{51}	—	December 6, 2002	Socorro	LINEAR	·	880 m	MPC · JPL
718932	2017 XZ_{51}	—	September 14, 2007	Mount Lemmon	Mount Lemmon Survey	KOR	1.0 km	MPC · JPL
718933	2017 XD_{55}	—	May 8, 2011	Mount Lemmon	Mount Lemmon Survey	·	1.1 km	MPC · JPL
718934	2017 XQ_{59}	—	December 18, 2009	Mount Lemmon	Mount Lemmon Survey	·	870 m	MPC · JPL
718935	2017 XC_{68}	—	December 13, 2017	Haleakala	Pan-STARRS 1	·	2.0 km	MPC · JPL
718936	2017 XZ_{69}	—	December 12, 2017	Haleakala	Pan-STARRS 1	THM	1.6 km	MPC · JPL
718937	2017 XR_{71}	—	December 12, 2017	Haleakala	Pan-STARRS 1	HNS	920 m	MPC · JPL
718938	2017 XG_{72}	—	December 13, 2017	Kitt Peak	Spacewatch	·	1.7 km	MPC · JPL
718939	2017 XE_{73}	—	December 13, 2017	Haleakala	Pan-STARRS 1	·	1.1 km	MPC · JPL
718940	2017 XU_{73}	—	December 13, 2017	Haleakala	Pan-STARRS 1	·	1.1 km	MPC · JPL
718941	2017 XF_{75}	—	December 12, 2017	Haleakala	Pan-STARRS 1	·	1.1 km	MPC · JPL
718942	2017 XK_{75}	—	December 8, 2017	Haleakala	Pan-STARRS 1	EUN	940 m	MPC · JPL
718943	2017 XA_{79}	—	December 14, 2017	Mount Lemmon	Mount Lemmon Survey	AGN	930 m	MPC · JPL
718944	2017 XJ_{79}	—	December 15, 2017	Mount Lemmon	Mount Lemmon Survey	H	500 m	MPC · JPL
718945	2017 XC_{85}	—	December 8, 2017	Haleakala	Pan-STARRS 1	·	930 m	MPC · JPL
718946	2017 XU_{89}	—	December 15, 2006	Kitt Peak	Spacewatch	·	900 m	MPC · JPL
718947	2017 XN_{90}	—	December 22, 2008	Kitt Peak	Spacewatch	·	1.3 km	MPC · JPL
718948	2017 XD_{98}	—	December 10, 2017	Haleakala	Pan-STARRS 1	(45637)	2.4 km	MPC · JPL
718949	2017 YA	—	September 11, 2010	Catalina	CSS	·	600 m	MPC · JPL
718950	2017 YD_{3}	—	April 27, 2016	Haleakala	Pan-STARRS 1	H	460 m	MPC · JPL
718951	2017 YG_{12}	—	October 11, 2004	Kitt Peak	Deep Ecliptic Survey	·	940 m	MPC · JPL
718952	2017 YK_{12}	—	September 28, 2006	Kitt Peak	Spacewatch	·	700 m	MPC · JPL
718953	2017 YB_{14}	—	February 20, 2014	Haleakala	Pan-STARRS 1	·	1.4 km	MPC · JPL
718954	2017 YM_{15}	—	October 31, 2013	Mount Lemmon	Mount Lemmon Survey	EUN	1.2 km	MPC · JPL
718955	2017 YF_{25}	—	September 6, 2008	Catalina	CSS	·	1.1 km	MPC · JPL
718956	2017 YD_{27}	—	December 29, 2017	Haleakala	Pan-STARRS 1	·	1.8 km	MPC · JPL
718957	2017 YF_{28}	—	May 23, 2014	Haleakala	Pan-STARRS 1	·	1.3 km	MPC · JPL
718958	2017 YV_{29}	—	July 14, 2009	Kitt Peak	Spacewatch	·	930 m	MPC · JPL
718959	2017 YZ_{31}	—	December 28, 2017	Mount Lemmon	Mount Lemmon Survey	(5)	920 m	MPC · JPL
718960	2017 YA_{32}	—	December 23, 2017	Haleakala	Pan-STARRS 1	AGN	1.0 km	MPC · JPL
718961	2017 YE_{33}	—	December 29, 2017	Haleakala	Pan-STARRS 1	·	1.5 km	MPC · JPL
718962	2017 YN_{33}	—	May 14, 2015	Cerro Paranal	Gaia-GBOT	·	900 m	MPC · JPL
718963	2017 YE_{35}	—	December 21, 2017	Mount Lemmon	Mount Lemmon Survey	·	2.3 km	MPC · JPL
718964	2017 YH_{43}	—	December 24, 2017	Haleakala	Pan-STARRS 1	·	2.2 km	MPC · JPL
718965	2017 YP_{45}	—	December 23, 2017	Haleakala	Pan-STARRS 1	·	2.3 km	MPC · JPL
718966	2017 YQ_{46}	—	August 21, 2015	Haleakala	Pan-STARRS 1	·	2.0 km	MPC · JPL
718967	2017 YY_{51}	—	December 28, 2017	Mount Lemmon	Mount Lemmon Survey	JUN	910 m	MPC · JPL
718968	2017 YQ_{53}	—	May 21, 2014	Haleakala	Pan-STARRS 1	·	1.2 km	MPC · JPL
718969	2018 AQ	—	August 30, 2014	Haleakala	Pan-STARRS 1	H	470 m	MPC · JPL
718970	2018 AD_{2}	—	December 24, 2017	Haleakala	Pan-STARRS 1	H	400 m	MPC · JPL
718971	2018 AU_{6}	—	May 5, 2008	Mount Lemmon	Mount Lemmon Survey	V	530 m	MPC · JPL
718972	2018 AQ_{7}	—	January 10, 2013	Haleakala	Pan-STARRS 1	·	1.6 km	MPC · JPL
718973	2018 AX_{8}	—	January 13, 2005	Kitt Peak	Spacewatch	·	1.7 km	MPC · JPL
718974	2018 AA_{10}	—	April 11, 2005	Mount Lemmon	Mount Lemmon Survey	·	1.5 km	MPC · JPL
718975	2018 AG_{11}	—	January 26, 2006	Mount Lemmon	Mount Lemmon Survey	·	780 m	MPC · JPL
718976	2018 AS_{14}	—	November 9, 2007	Mount Lemmon	Mount Lemmon Survey	·	1.4 km	MPC · JPL
718977	2018 AL_{15}	—	March 9, 2011	Kitt Peak	Spacewatch	·	1.2 km	MPC · JPL
718978	2018 AP_{15}	—	November 28, 1994	Kitt Peak	Spacewatch	MAS	650 m	MPC · JPL
718979	2018 AM_{16}	—	January 30, 2009	Mount Lemmon	Mount Lemmon Survey	ADE	1.5 km	MPC · JPL
718980	2018 AD_{18}	—	November 2, 2007	Kitt Peak	Spacewatch	·	1.5 km	MPC · JPL
718981	2018 AK_{23}	—	January 14, 2018	Mount Lemmon	Mount Lemmon Survey	H	440 m	MPC · JPL
718982	2018 AF_{27}	—	January 11, 2018	Haleakala	Pan-STARRS 1	·	1.1 km	MPC · JPL
718983	2018 AB_{30}	—	January 11, 2018	Haleakala	Pan-STARRS 1	·	1.7 km	MPC · JPL
718984	2018 AU_{31}	—	January 12, 2018	Haleakala	Pan-STARRS 1	·	1.0 km	MPC · JPL
718985	2018 AW_{31}	—	December 17, 2015	Mount Lemmon	Mount Lemmon Survey	·	3.2 km	MPC · JPL
718986	2018 AY_{31}	—	January 15, 2018	Haleakala	Pan-STARRS 1	·	1.3 km	MPC · JPL
718987	2018 AU_{32}	—	April 18, 2015	Cerro Tololo	DECam	CLA	1.1 km	MPC · JPL
718988	2018 AC_{34}	—	May 23, 2015	Cerro Tololo	DECam	·	840 m	MPC · JPL
718989	2018 AS_{40}	—	January 15, 2018	Mount Lemmon	Mount Lemmon Survey	H	370 m	MPC · JPL
718990	2018 AP_{44}	—	February 10, 2014	Haleakala	Pan-STARRS 1	·	2.2 km	MPC · JPL
718991	2018 AF_{47}	—	January 13, 2018	Haleakala	Pan-STARRS 1	NEM	1.6 km	MPC · JPL
718992	2018 AG_{47}	—	January 11, 2018	Haleakala	Pan-STARRS 1	·	1.1 km	MPC · JPL
718993	2018 AM_{47}	—	January 15, 2018	Haleakala	Pan-STARRS 1	AGN	900 m	MPC · JPL
718994	2018 AQ_{48}	—	April 24, 2014	Haleakala	Pan-STARRS 1	·	2.1 km	MPC · JPL
718995	2018 AS_{48}	—	January 12, 2018	Haleakala	Pan-STARRS 1	·	2.3 km	MPC · JPL
718996	2018 AY_{48}	—	January 15, 2018	Haleakala	Pan-STARRS 1	NAE	1.7 km	MPC · JPL
718997	2018 AR_{50}	—	October 9, 2016	Mount Lemmon	Mount Lemmon Survey	·	1.3 km	MPC · JPL
718998	2018 AG_{52}	—	January 15, 2018	Haleakala	Pan-STARRS 1	·	1.5 km	MPC · JPL
718999	2018 AR_{61}	—	January 15, 2018	Haleakala	Pan-STARRS 1	·	1.2 km	MPC · JPL
719000	2018 AG_{63}	—	January 12, 2018	Mount Lemmon	Mount Lemmon Survey	·	1.4 km	MPC · JPL

back to top

== Meaning of names ==
As minor planet discoveries are confirmed, they are given a permanent number by the IAU's Minor Planet Center (MPC), and the discoverers can then submit names for them, following the IAU's naming conventions. The list below concerns those minor planets in the specified number-range that have received names, and explains the meanings of those names.

Official naming citations of newly named small Solar System bodies are approved and published in a bulletin by IAU's Working Group for Small Bodies Nomenclature (WGSBN). Before May 2021, citations were published in MPC's Minor Planet Circulars for many decades. Recent citations can also be found on the JPL Small-Body Database (SBDB). Until his death in 2016, German astronomer Lutz D. Schmadel compiled these citations into the Dictionary of Minor Planet Names (DMP) and regularly updated the collection.

Based on Paul Herget's The Names of the Minor Planets, Schmadel also researched the unclear origin of numerous asteroids, most of which had been named prior to World War II. This article incorporates text from this source, which is in the public domain: SBDB New namings may only be added to this list below after official publication as the preannouncement of names is condemned. The WGSBN publishes a comprehensive guideline for the naming rules of non-cometary small Solar System bodies.

Named minor planet	Provisional	This minor planet was named for...	Ref · Catalog
718490 Marcelosouza	2017 FZ_{216}	Marcelo de Oliveira Souza, Brazilian astrophysicist.	IAU · 718490
718492 Quro	2017 FZ_{233}	Quro (born 1985), Japanese manga artist who created the comic Asteroid in Love.	IAU · 718492
718629 Wangzhenru	2p17 OZ_{105}	Wang Zhenru, a Chinese high-energy astrophysicist at Nanjing University.	IAU · 718629
718863 Zhouwenjie	2017 UL_{165}	Zhou Wenjie, Chinese amateur astronomer.	IAU · 718863
