= 718492 Quro =

Main-belt asteroid

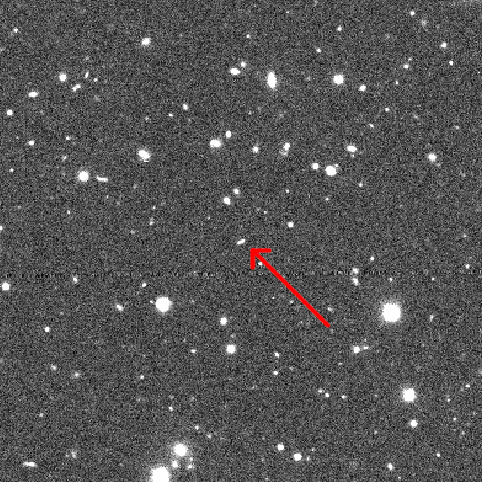

Discovery
- Discovered by: COIAS
- Discovery site: Maunakea
- Discovery date: 22 March 2017

Designations
- Named after: Quro (manga author クロ kuro)
- Alternative designations: 2017 FZ_{233}
- Minor planet category: main-belt

Orbital characteristics
- Epoch 31 March 2024 (JD 2460400.5)
- Uncertainty parameter 0
- Observation arc: 3901 days
- Aphelion: 3.357 AU
- Perihelion: 2.9942078 AU
- Semi-major axis: 3.1756056 AU
- Eccentricity: 0.0571223
- Orbital period (sidereal): 5.66 yr
- Mean anomaly: 118.12600°
- Mean motion: 0° 10^{m} 26.999^{s} / day
- Inclination: 8.24207°
- Longitude of ascending node: 283.57689°
- Argument of perihelion: 202.86556°

Physical characteristics
- Absolute magnitude (H): 17.58

718492 Quro (provisional designation 2017 FZ_{233}) is a main-belt asteroid. It was discovered on 22 March 2017, by the citizen science project Come On! Impacting ASteroids (COIAS) using archival data from the Subaru Telescope, which was first reported to the Minor Planet Center in 2024.

== Orbit ==
Quro orbits the Sun within the main asteroid belt with a semimajor axis of about 3.2 astronomical units (AU) and an inclination of about 8 degrees from the ecliptic plane. It has a fairly circular orbit with an eccentricity of about 0.057. It completes an orbit around the Sun about every 5.6 years.

== Discovery and naming ==
Quro has been observed for the first time by the Subaru Telescope in 2012, later by the Cerro Tololo Inter-American Observatory in 2014, and later again by the Subaru Telescope in 2017. Pan-STARRS and Kitt Peak National Observatory have observed Quro between the years 2019 and 2023. These observations altogether made it possible to refine the orbit determination of the asteroid well enough to give it an orbital uncertainty parameter of 0 by the Minor Planet Center.

Although the asteroid first appeared in a 2012 observation, the astrometric measurements of 2017 sightings were made and submitted to the MPC earlier, thus being assigned as the discovery observations per MPC regulations. These measurements were done by citizen scientists taking part in COIAS (Come On! Impacting ASteroids) project, giving the opportunity to the project team and the measurers an opportunity to propose a name for the numbered asteroid. It was named after the author of the comic work Asteroid in Love (original title shortened as "Koias", to which the name of the project "COIAS" references), with the naming citation published as follows:

Quro (b. 1985) is a Japanese manga artist who created the comic Asteroid in Love. Real astronomical events and institutes appear in the work as models. Thanks to "Chura Ken", an event held on Ishigakijima Island, finding new asteroids and astronomical phenomena has become popular among young students, giving them real research experiences.
