= List of minor planets: 769001–770000 =

The following is a partial list of minor planets, running from minor-planet number 769001 through 770000, inclusive. The primary data for this and other partial lists is based on JPL's "Small-Body Orbital Elements" and data available from the Minor Planet Center. Critical list information is also provided by the MPC, unless otherwise specified from Lowell Observatory. A detailed description of the table's columns and additional sources are given on the main page including a complete list of every page in this series, and a statistical break-up on the dynamical classification of minor planets.

Also see the summary list of all named bodies in numerical and alphabetical order, and the corresponding naming citations for the number range of this particular list. New namings may only be added to this list after official publication, as the preannouncement of names is condemned by the Working Group for Small Bodies Nomenclature of the International Astronomical Union.

Near-Earth obj.	MBA (inner)	MBA (outer)	Centaur
Mars-crosser	MBA (middle)	Jupiter trojan	Trans-Neptunian obj.
Unclassified

== 769001–769100 ==
Designation			Discovery			Properties		Ref
Permanent	Provisional	Named after	Date	Site	Discoverer(s)	Category	Diam.	Ref
769001	2015 GA_{24}	—	January 11, 2014	Kitt Peak	Spacewatch	TIR	2.3 km	MPC · JPL
769002	2015 GX_{24}	—	March 22, 2015	Haleakala	Pan-STARRS 1	·	2.6 km	MPC · JPL
769003	2015 GF_{26}	—	April 12, 2015	Haleakala	Pan-STARRS 1	·	2.2 km	MPC · JPL
769004	2015 GP_{31}	—	February 16, 2015	Haleakala	Pan-STARRS 1	V	460 m	MPC · JPL
769005	2015 GT_{31}	—	May 5, 2010	Mount Lemmon	Mount Lemmon Survey	·	1.6 km	MPC · JPL
769006	2015 GH_{33}	—	November 10, 2013	Mount Lemmon	Mount Lemmon Survey	·	620 m	MPC · JPL
769007	2015 GD_{45}	—	March 22, 2015	Haleakala	Pan-STARRS 1	·	2.3 km	MPC · JPL
769008	2015 GS_{46}	—	May 7, 2008	Kitt Peak	Spacewatch	·	810 m	MPC · JPL
769009	2015 GE_{50}	—	April 15, 2015	Haleakala	Pan-STARRS 1	·	2.5 km	MPC · JPL
769010	2015 GO_{51}	—	April 11, 2015	Kitt Peak	Spacewatch	·	770 m	MPC · JPL
769011	2015 GE_{61}	—	April 13, 2015	Haleakala	Pan-STARRS 1	·	1.7 km	MPC · JPL
769012	2015 GB_{62}	—	April 13, 2015	Haleakala	Pan-STARRS 1	·	1.3 km	MPC · JPL
769013	2015 GG_{62}	—	April 15, 2015	Mount Lemmon	Mount Lemmon Survey	EOS	1.3 km	MPC · JPL
769014	2015 GN_{62}	—	April 13, 2015	Mount Lemmon	Mount Lemmon Survey	EOS	1.5 km	MPC · JPL
769015	2015 GM_{83}	—	January 25, 2014	Haleakala	Pan-STARRS 1	centaur	20 km	MPC · JPL
769016	2015 HE	—	March 27, 2015	Mount Lemmon	Mount Lemmon Survey	L4	8.5 km	MPC · JPL
769017	2015 HV_{5}	—	October 24, 2013	Mount Lemmon	Mount Lemmon Survey	·	2.0 km	MPC · JPL
769018	2015 HZ_{5}	—	January 22, 2015	Haleakala	Pan-STARRS 1	·	2.0 km	MPC · JPL
769019	2015 HG_{6}	—	January 28, 2011	Mount Lemmon	Mount Lemmon Survey	·	930 m	MPC · JPL
769020	2015 HZ_{7}	—	March 24, 2015	Haleakala	Pan-STARRS 1	·	920 m	MPC · JPL
769021	2015 HY_{8}	—	January 19, 2008	Kitt Peak	Spacewatch	(883)	530 m	MPC · JPL
769022	2015 HX_{15}	—	January 28, 2015	Haleakala	Pan-STARRS 1	LUT	2.8 km	MPC · JPL
769023	2015 HG_{18}	—	March 22, 2015	Haleakala	Pan-STARRS 1	H	340 m	MPC · JPL
769024	2015 HQ_{21}	—	October 14, 2010	Mount Lemmon	Mount Lemmon Survey	·	550 m	MPC · JPL
769025	2015 HS_{21}	—	October 9, 2007	Mount Lemmon	Mount Lemmon Survey	·	2.3 km	MPC · JPL
769026	2015 HU_{21}	—	March 17, 2015	Kitt Peak	Spacewatch	V	540 m	MPC · JPL
769027	2015 HQ_{22}	—	September 23, 2008	Mount Lemmon	Mount Lemmon Survey	·	1.2 km	MPC · JPL
769028	2015 HV_{23}	—	October 18, 2012	Haleakala	Pan-STARRS 1	·	2.5 km	MPC · JPL
769029	2015 HF_{34}	—	March 18, 2015	Haleakala	Pan-STARRS 1	·	2.0 km	MPC · JPL
769030	2015 HH_{36}	—	January 30, 2011	Mayhill-ISON	L. Elenin	·	850 m	MPC · JPL
769031	2015 HG_{37}	—	November 7, 2012	Haleakala	Pan-STARRS 1	·	2.2 km	MPC · JPL
769032	2015 HV_{38}	—	December 10, 2010	Kitt Peak	Spacewatch	·	620 m	MPC · JPL
769033	2015 HH_{41}	—	February 25, 2011	Mount Lemmon	Mount Lemmon Survey	·	880 m	MPC · JPL
769034	2015 HN_{41}	—	October 26, 2012	Mount Lemmon	Mount Lemmon Survey	·	2.8 km	MPC · JPL
769035	2015 HQ_{41}	—	March 17, 2015	Haleakala	Pan-STARRS 1	·	2.1 km	MPC · JPL
769036	2015 HY_{41}	—	March 21, 2015	Haleakala	Pan-STARRS 1	·	590 m	MPC · JPL
769037	2015 HL_{45}	—	March 25, 2015	Haleakala	Pan-STARRS 1	L4	7.1 km	MPC · JPL
769038	2015 HT_{46}	—	December 31, 2013	Mount Lemmon	Mount Lemmon Survey	·	2.2 km	MPC · JPL
769039	2015 HV_{46}	—	January 2, 2009	Kitt Peak	Spacewatch	·	1.5 km	MPC · JPL
769040	2015 HN_{47}	—	March 21, 2015	Haleakala	Pan-STARRS 1	VER	2.1 km	MPC · JPL
769041	2015 HA_{50}	—	March 22, 2015	Haleakala	Pan-STARRS 1	·	2.1 km	MPC · JPL
769042	2015 HG_{50}	—	March 2, 2009	Mount Lemmon	Mount Lemmon Survey	LIX	2.2 km	MPC · JPL
769043	2015 HF_{55}	—	March 21, 2015	Haleakala	Pan-STARRS 1	·	1.4 km	MPC · JPL
769044	2015 HD_{67}	—	January 29, 2011	Mount Lemmon	Mount Lemmon Survey	·	730 m	MPC · JPL
769045	2015 HU_{69}	—	October 31, 2013	Kitt Peak	Spacewatch	·	830 m	MPC · JPL
769046	2015 HW_{71}	—	March 19, 2015	Haleakala	Pan-STARRS 1	·	2.4 km	MPC · JPL
769047	2015 HX_{73}	—	April 23, 2015	Haleakala	Pan-STARRS 1	·	2.3 km	MPC · JPL
769048	2015 HL_{74}	—	March 17, 2015	Haleakala	Pan-STARRS 1	·	2.4 km	MPC · JPL
769049	2015 HU_{77}	—	April 23, 2015	Haleakala	Pan-STARRS 1	·	1.3 km	MPC · JPL
769050	2015 HX_{79}	—	April 23, 2015	Haleakala	Pan-STARRS 1	·	840 m	MPC · JPL
769051	2015 HZ_{80}	—	April 28, 2004	Kitt Peak	Spacewatch	NYS	830 m	MPC · JPL
769052	2015 HC_{81}	—	April 23, 2015	Haleakala	Pan-STARRS 1	·	880 m	MPC · JPL
769053	2015 HC_{82}	—	February 25, 2011	Mount Lemmon	Mount Lemmon Survey	·	960 m	MPC · JPL
769054	2015 HW_{82}	—	September 4, 2011	Haleakala	Pan-STARRS 1	·	2.3 km	MPC · JPL
769055	2015 HW_{85}	—	October 12, 2007	Mount Lemmon	Mount Lemmon Survey	·	2.3 km	MPC · JPL
769056	2015 HD_{87}	—	February 23, 2015	Haleakala	Pan-STARRS 1	V	430 m	MPC · JPL
769057	2015 HF_{91}	—	April 14, 2007	Kitt Peak	Spacewatch	H	350 m	MPC · JPL
769058	2015 HJ_{94}	—	April 14, 2004	Kitt Peak	Spacewatch	·	970 m	MPC · JPL
769059	2015 HG_{97}	—	September 17, 2006	Kitt Peak	Spacewatch	VER	2.1 km	MPC · JPL
769060	2015 HB_{102}	—	March 2, 2011	Mount Lemmon	Mount Lemmon Survey	·	760 m	MPC · JPL
769061	2015 HP_{102}	—	April 23, 2015	Haleakala	Pan-STARRS 1	EOS	1.5 km	MPC · JPL
769062	2015 HX_{102}	—	September 7, 2011	Kitt Peak	Spacewatch	·	2.3 km	MPC · JPL
769063	2015 HY_{102}	—	November 24, 2006	Mount Lemmon	Mount Lemmon Survey	·	2.0 km	MPC · JPL
769064	2015 HB_{103}	—	December 31, 2008	Kitt Peak	Spacewatch	·	1.3 km	MPC · JPL
769065	2015 HH_{106}	—	April 23, 2015	Haleakala	Pan-STARRS 1	·	2.6 km	MPC · JPL
769066	2015 HN_{107}	—	February 16, 2015	Haleakala	Pan-STARRS 1	EUP	2.5 km	MPC · JPL
769067	2015 HQ_{108}	—	April 23, 2015	Haleakala	Pan-STARRS 1	·	2.6 km	MPC · JPL
769068	2015 HO_{111}	—	April 23, 2015	Haleakala	Pan-STARRS 1	·	830 m	MPC · JPL
769069	2015 HW_{112}	—	August 13, 2012	Haleakala	Pan-STARRS 1	·	870 m	MPC · JPL
769070	2015 HA_{113}	—	April 23, 2015	Haleakala	Pan-STARRS 1	·	1.7 km	MPC · JPL
769071	2015 HS_{113}	—	February 23, 2015	Haleakala	Pan-STARRS 1	·	940 m	MPC · JPL
769072	2015 HK_{115}	—	January 24, 2014	Haleakala	Pan-STARRS 1	·	1.6 km	MPC · JPL
769073	2015 HE_{116}	—	April 23, 2015	Haleakala	Pan-STARRS 1	·	2.4 km	MPC · JPL
769074	2015 HM_{116}	—	April 24, 2015	Haleakala	Pan-STARRS 1	·	2.7 km	MPC · JPL
769075	2015 HH_{126}	—	October 15, 2013	Mount Lemmon	Mount Lemmon Survey	H	340 m	MPC · JPL
769076	2015 HX_{130}	—	October 17, 2012	Haleakala	Pan-STARRS 1	·	1.9 km	MPC · JPL
769077	2015 HP_{133}	—	February 22, 2009	Kitt Peak	Spacewatch	·	1.7 km	MPC · JPL
769078	2015 HV_{133}	—	March 17, 2015	Haleakala	Pan-STARRS 1	·	2.8 km	MPC · JPL
769079	2015 HH_{137}	—	September 21, 2012	Mount Lemmon	Mount Lemmon Survey	·	1.1 km	MPC · JPL
769080	2015 HQ_{139}	—	September 26, 2003	Apache Point	SDSS	·	1.1 km	MPC · JPL
769081	2015 HD_{141}	—	February 8, 2011	Mount Lemmon	Mount Lemmon Survey	·	650 m	MPC · JPL
769082	2015 HZ_{142}	—	March 6, 2011	Mount Lemmon	Mount Lemmon Survey	·	670 m	MPC · JPL
769083	2015 HT_{146}	—	April 23, 2015	Haleakala	Pan-STARRS 1	V	460 m	MPC · JPL
769084	2015 HD_{154}	—	September 18, 2009	Kitt Peak	Spacewatch	·	830 m	MPC · JPL
769085	2015 HG_{154}	—	February 7, 2011	Mount Lemmon	Mount Lemmon Survey	·	680 m	MPC · JPL
769086	2015 HK_{154}	—	April 23, 2015	Haleakala	Pan-STARRS 1	·	820 m	MPC · JPL
769087	2015 HC_{156}	—	October 14, 2013	Kitt Peak	Spacewatch	·	760 m	MPC · JPL
769088	2015 HZ_{158}	—	January 26, 2011	Mount Lemmon	Mount Lemmon Survey	·	650 m	MPC · JPL
769089	2015 HK_{159}	—	November 26, 2013	Mount Lemmon	Mount Lemmon Survey	·	830 m	MPC · JPL
769090	2015 HW_{160}	—	February 11, 2011	Mount Lemmon	Mount Lemmon Survey	·	600 m	MPC · JPL
769091	2015 HD_{162}	—	September 10, 2008	Kitt Peak	Spacewatch	·	770 m	MPC · JPL
769092	2015 HS_{162}	—	February 13, 2011	Mount Lemmon	Mount Lemmon Survey	·	640 m	MPC · JPL
769093	2015 HO_{163}	—	April 3, 2008	Mount Lemmon	Mount Lemmon Survey	·	570 m	MPC · JPL
769094	2015 HS_{163}	—	May 3, 2011	Kitt Peak	Spacewatch	·	860 m	MPC · JPL
769095	2015 HE_{166}	—	March 22, 2009	Mount Lemmon	Mount Lemmon Survey	THM	1.9 km	MPC · JPL
769096	2015 HM_{170}	—	April 24, 2015	Haleakala	Pan-STARRS 1	H	450 m	MPC · JPL
769097	2015 HE_{175}	—	March 21, 2015	Haleakala	Pan-STARRS 1	·	3.0 km	MPC · JPL
769098	2015 HU_{183}	—	April 16, 2012	Haleakala	Pan-STARRS 1	H	430 m	MPC · JPL
769099	2015 HC_{184}	—	April 23, 2015	Haleakala	Pan-STARRS 1	H	370 m	MPC · JPL
769100	2015 HZ_{191}	—	April 23, 2015	Haleakala	Pan-STARRS 1	·	1.1 km	MPC · JPL

== 769101–769200 ==
back to top

Designation			Discovery			Properties		Ref
Permanent	Provisional	Named after	Date	Site	Discoverer(s)	Category	Diam.	Ref
769101	2015 HA_{192}	—	April 27, 2011	Mount Lemmon	Mount Lemmon Survey	·	950 m	MPC · JPL
769102	2015 HO_{192}	—	April 23, 2015	Haleakala	Pan-STARRS 1	·	2.3 km	MPC · JPL
769103	2015 HO_{193}	—	April 25, 2015	Haleakala	Pan-STARRS 1	·	1 km	MPC · JPL
769104	2015 HR_{193}	—	April 20, 2015	Kitt Peak	Spacewatch	·	810 m	MPC · JPL
769105	2015 HB_{194}	—	April 25, 2015	Haleakala	Pan-STARRS 1	V	410 m	MPC · JPL
769106	2015 HN_{199}	—	April 25, 2015	Haleakala	Pan-STARRS 1	·	2.8 km	MPC · JPL
769107	2015 HU_{199}	—	April 23, 2015	Haleakala	Pan-STARRS 1	·	2.4 km	MPC · JPL
769108	2015 HV_{200}	—	April 18, 2015	Haleakala	Pan-STARRS 1	·	970 m	MPC · JPL
769109	2015 HA_{201}	—	April 23, 2015	Mount Lemmon	Mount Lemmon Survey	H	350 m	MPC · JPL
769110	2015 HK_{201}	—	April 18, 2015	Haleakala	Pan-STARRS 1	·	2.2 km	MPC · JPL
769111	2015 HE_{202}	—	April 23, 2015	Haleakala	Pan-STARRS 1	·	2.3 km	MPC · JPL
769112	2015 HL_{202}	—	April 18, 2015	Haleakala	Pan-STARRS 1	·	900 m	MPC · JPL
769113	2015 HL_{206}	—	April 18, 2015	Mount Lemmon	Mount Lemmon Survey	·	960 m	MPC · JPL
769114	2015 HQ_{208}	—	April 18, 2015	Catalina	CSS	EUP	2.6 km	MPC · JPL
769115	2015 HJ_{209}	—	April 21, 2015	Catalina	CSS	·	1.1 km	MPC · JPL
769116	2015 HE_{210}	—	April 23, 2015	Haleakala	Pan-STARRS 2	LIX	2.6 km	MPC · JPL
769117	2015 HT_{210}	—	April 23, 2015	Haleakala	Pan-STARRS 1	·	1.4 km	MPC · JPL
769118	2015 HZ_{212}	—	April 23, 2015	Haleakala	Pan-STARRS 1	·	2.4 km	MPC · JPL
769119	2015 HR_{214}	—	April 18, 2015	Mount Lemmon	Mount Lemmon Survey	·	600 m	MPC · JPL
769120	2015 HR_{215}	—	April 24, 2015	Haleakala	Pan-STARRS 1	VER	2.0 km	MPC · JPL
769121	2015 HU_{216}	—	April 23, 2015	Haleakala	Pan-STARRS 1	·	2.6 km	MPC · JPL
769122	2015 HZ_{216}	—	April 25, 2015	Mount Lemmon	Mount Lemmon Survey	·	2.3 km	MPC · JPL
769123	2015 HU_{219}	—	April 24, 2015	Haleakala	Pan-STARRS 1	(21885)	1.9 km	MPC · JPL
769124	2015 HT_{220}	—	April 18, 2015	Haleakala	Pan-STARRS 1	·	2.6 km	MPC · JPL
769125	2015 HQ_{221}	—	April 25, 2015	Haleakala	Pan-STARRS 1	·	3.0 km	MPC · JPL
769126	2015 HV_{221}	—	November 6, 2012	Mount Lemmon	Mount Lemmon Survey	·	2.3 km	MPC · JPL
769127	2015 HB_{222}	—	January 28, 2014	Mount Lemmon	Mount Lemmon Survey	·	2.0 km	MPC · JPL
769128	2015 HC_{222}	—	April 23, 2015	Haleakala	Pan-STARRS 1	·	880 m	MPC · JPL
769129	2015 HB_{223}	—	April 23, 2015	Haleakala	Pan-STARRS 1	·	1.0 km	MPC · JPL
769130	2015 HV_{226}	—	November 29, 2013	Mount Lemmon	Mount Lemmon Survey	·	920 m	MPC · JPL
769131	2015 HL_{233}	—	April 23, 2015	Haleakala	Pan-STARRS 1	·	940 m	MPC · JPL
769132	2015 HN_{233}	—	October 19, 2012	Haleakala	Pan-STARRS 1	·	2.1 km	MPC · JPL
769133	2015 HS_{233}	—	May 18, 2015	Haleakala	Pan-STARRS 1	·	2.1 km	MPC · JPL
769134	2015 HL_{235}	—	April 18, 2015	Cerro Tololo	DECam	·	2.4 km	MPC · JPL
769135	2015 HG_{238}	—	July 5, 2016	Haleakala	Pan-STARRS 1	·	2.2 km	MPC · JPL
769136	2015 HB_{247}	—	April 19, 2015	Cerro Tololo	DECam	VER	2.0 km	MPC · JPL
769137	2015 HC_{266}	—	July 28, 2011	Haleakala	Pan-STARRS 1	·	2.1 km	MPC · JPL
769138	2015 HZ_{283}	—	April 18, 2015	Cerro Tololo	DECam	·	2.7 km	MPC · JPL
769139	2015 HF_{301}	—	February 9, 2013	Haleakala	Pan-STARRS 1	L4	5.8 km	MPC · JPL
769140	2015 HH_{305}	—	April 19, 2015	Cerro Tololo	DECam	·	2.0 km	MPC · JPL
769141	2015 HH_{347}	—	April 24, 2015	Haleakala	Pan-STARRS 1	·	2.6 km	MPC · JPL
769142	2015 HO_{347}	—	September 30, 2006	Kitt Peak	Spacewatch	·	2.2 km	MPC · JPL
769143	2015 HE_{348}	—	April 18, 2015	Cerro Tololo	DECam	·	2.1 km	MPC · JPL
769144	2015 JT_{6}	—	October 1, 2006	Kitt Peak	Spacewatch	·	550 m	MPC · JPL
769145	2015 JB_{8}	—	January 5, 2014	Haleakala	Pan-STARRS 1	·	2.4 km	MPC · JPL
769146	2015 JP_{10}	—	March 9, 2011	Mount Lemmon	Mount Lemmon Survey	V	440 m	MPC · JPL
769147	2015 JQ_{10}	—	May 15, 2015	Haleakala	Pan-STARRS 1	·	890 m	MPC · JPL
769148	2015 JR_{11}	—	May 14, 2015	Haleakala	Pan-STARRS 1	H	420 m	MPC · JPL
769149	2015 JM_{12}	—	October 14, 2012	Kitt Peak	Spacewatch	·	2.3 km	MPC · JPL
769150	2015 JT_{12}	—	December 4, 2007	Kitt Peak	Spacewatch	·	2.6 km	MPC · JPL
769151	2015 JC_{14}	—	April 20, 2009	Mount Lemmon	Mount Lemmon Survey	THM	2.0 km	MPC · JPL
769152	2015 JY_{14}	—	February 25, 2011	Kitt Peak	Spacewatch	CLA	1.2 km	MPC · JPL
769153	2015 JZ_{15}	—	January 9, 2014	Haleakala	Pan-STARRS 1	·	2.2 km	MPC · JPL
769154	2015 JA_{18}	—	May 13, 2015	Haleakala	Pan-STARRS 1	(895)	2.8 km	MPC · JPL
769155	2015 JS_{19}	—	May 10, 2015	Mount Lemmon	Mount Lemmon Survey	·	320 m	MPC · JPL
769156	2015 JL_{21}	—	May 11, 2015	Mount Lemmon	Mount Lemmon Survey	·	820 m	MPC · JPL
769157	2015 JQ_{21}	—	May 14, 2015	Haleakala	Pan-STARRS 1	·	940 m	MPC · JPL
769158	2015 JG_{24}	—	May 12, 2015	Mount Lemmon	Mount Lemmon Survey	·	2.4 km	MPC · JPL
769159	2015 JU_{27}	—	December 2, 2012	Mount Lemmon	Mount Lemmon Survey	·	2.1 km	MPC · JPL
769160	2015 JG_{28}	—	March 21, 2009	Mount Lemmon	Mount Lemmon Survey	THM	2.1 km	MPC · JPL
769161	2015 KO_{1}	—	January 28, 2015	Haleakala	Pan-STARRS 1	TIR	2.1 km	MPC · JPL
769162	2015 KF_{2}	—	January 17, 2008	Kitt Peak	Spacewatch	·	710 m	MPC · JPL
769163	2015 KR_{6}	—	February 27, 2015	Haleakala	Pan-STARRS 1	EOS	1.6 km	MPC · JPL
769164	2015 KY_{23}	—	May 18, 2015	Haleakala	Pan-STARRS 1	·	800 m	MPC · JPL
769165	2015 KY_{24}	—	February 26, 2014	Mount Lemmon	Mount Lemmon Survey	·	2.7 km	MPC · JPL
769166	2015 KS_{26}	—	September 22, 2012	Kitt Peak	Spacewatch	NYS	750 m	MPC · JPL
769167	2015 KS_{29}	—	March 26, 2014	Mount Lemmon	Mount Lemmon Survey	L4	7.0 km	MPC · JPL
769168	2015 KU_{30}	—	May 12, 2015	Mount Lemmon	Mount Lemmon Survey	·	2.3 km	MPC · JPL
769169	2015 KV_{33}	—	May 11, 2015	Mount Lemmon	Mount Lemmon Survey	·	2.3 km	MPC · JPL
769170	2015 KA_{35}	—	November 1, 2005	Kitt Peak	Spacewatch	·	950 m	MPC · JPL
769171	2015 KD_{36}	—	April 3, 2011	Haleakala	Pan-STARRS 1	·	710 m	MPC · JPL
769172	2015 KX_{37}	—	March 31, 2015	Haleakala	Pan-STARRS 1	·	980 m	MPC · JPL
769173	2015 KB_{39}	—	May 1, 2009	Cerro Burek	I. de la Cueva	·	2.9 km	MPC · JPL
769174	2015 KF_{44}	—	May 18, 2015	Haleakala	Pan-STARRS 1	·	900 m	MPC · JPL
769175	2015 KV_{51}	—	May 20, 2015	Haleakala	Pan-STARRS 1	THM	1.8 km	MPC · JPL
769176	2015 KP_{53}	—	February 26, 2011	Mount Lemmon	Mount Lemmon Survey	·	750 m	MPC · JPL
769177	2015 KD_{56}	—	October 10, 2012	Mount Lemmon	Mount Lemmon Survey	PHO	810 m	MPC · JPL
769178	2015 KX_{60}	—	April 25, 2004	Kitt Peak	Spacewatch	THM	1.9 km	MPC · JPL
769179	2015 KO_{61}	—	February 25, 2011	Kitt Peak	Spacewatch	·	1.1 km	MPC · JPL
769180	2015 KW_{67}	—	February 2, 2009	Kitt Peak	Spacewatch	·	1.4 km	MPC · JPL
769181	2015 KM_{74}	—	May 21, 2015	Haleakala	Pan-STARRS 1	·	2.4 km	MPC · JPL
769182	2015 KQ_{74}	—	December 21, 2008	Kitt Peak	Spacewatch	·	2.0 km	MPC · JPL
769183	2015 KN_{75}	—	February 24, 2014	Haleakala	Pan-STARRS 1	EOS	1.8 km	MPC · JPL
769184	2015 KF_{79}	—	March 30, 2015	Haleakala	Pan-STARRS 1	·	780 m	MPC · JPL
769185	2015 KA_{80}	—	May 21, 2015	Haleakala	Pan-STARRS 1	·	2.5 km	MPC · JPL
769186	2015 KJ_{82}	—	February 26, 2014	Mount Lemmon	Mount Lemmon Survey	·	2.4 km	MPC · JPL
769187	2015 KD_{83}	—	May 21, 2015	Haleakala	Pan-STARRS 1	·	1.9 km	MPC · JPL
769188	2015 KX_{85}	—	February 28, 2014	Haleakala	Pan-STARRS 1	EOS	1.4 km	MPC · JPL
769189	2015 KY_{88}	—	May 21, 2015	Haleakala	Pan-STARRS 1	·	2.0 km	MPC · JPL
769190	2015 KA_{89}	—	May 21, 2015	Haleakala	Pan-STARRS 1	·	2.2 km	MPC · JPL
769191	2015 KZ_{89}	—	February 24, 2014	Haleakala	Pan-STARRS 1	·	2.1 km	MPC · JPL
769192	2015 KQ_{90}	—	May 21, 2015	Haleakala	Pan-STARRS 1	·	2.1 km	MPC · JPL
769193	2015 KO_{91}	—	January 31, 2006	Kitt Peak	Spacewatch	·	1.1 km	MPC · JPL
769194	2015 KQ_{92}	—	October 8, 2012	Haleakala	Pan-STARRS 1	·	1.5 km	MPC · JPL
769195	2015 KL_{94}	—	March 30, 2015	Haleakala	Pan-STARRS 1	·	770 m	MPC · JPL
769196	2015 KV_{98}	—	May 21, 2015	Haleakala	Pan-STARRS 1	EUN	900 m	MPC · JPL
769197	2015 KA_{106}	—	March 31, 2015	Haleakala	Pan-STARRS 1	·	1.7 km	MPC · JPL
769198	2015 KE_{107}	—	October 6, 2012	Haleakala	Pan-STARRS 1	·	970 m	MPC · JPL
769199	2015 KL_{111}	—	May 21, 2015	Haleakala	Pan-STARRS 1	·	2.3 km	MPC · JPL
769200	2015 KV_{114}	—	March 31, 2009	Mount Lemmon	Mount Lemmon Survey	EOS	1.5 km	MPC · JPL

== 769201–769300 ==
back to top

Designation			Discovery			Properties		Ref
Permanent	Provisional	Named after	Date	Site	Discoverer(s)	Category	Diam.	Ref
769201	2015 KQ_{117}	—	May 21, 2015	Haleakala	Pan-STARRS 1	·	3.0 km	MPC · JPL
769202	2015 KL_{118}	—	February 20, 2009	Catalina	CSS	TIR	2.8 km	MPC · JPL
769203	2015 KV_{124}	—	May 7, 2015	Mount Lemmon	Mount Lemmon Survey	MAS	600 m	MPC · JPL
769204	2015 KJ_{125}	—	May 22, 2015	Haleakala	Pan-STARRS 1	·	1.1 km	MPC · JPL
769205	2015 KN_{127}	—	April 25, 2015	Haleakala	Pan-STARRS 1	·	2.5 km	MPC · JPL
769206	2015 KP_{127}	—	March 29, 2004	Kitt Peak	Spacewatch	·	700 m	MPC · JPL
769207	2015 KU_{130}	—	March 9, 2011	Mount Lemmon	Mount Lemmon Survey	·	620 m	MPC · JPL
769208	2015 KP_{131}	—	May 22, 2015	Haleakala	Pan-STARRS 1	·	1.3 km	MPC · JPL
769209	2015 KN_{137}	—	February 13, 2007	Mount Lemmon	Mount Lemmon Survey	NYS	890 m	MPC · JPL
769210	2015 KA_{143}	—	November 10, 2013	Mount Lemmon	Mount Lemmon Survey	H	390 m	MPC · JPL
769211	2015 KS_{144}	—	September 12, 2004	Kitt Peak	Spacewatch	NYS	890 m	MPC · JPL
769212	2015 KY_{145}	—	March 21, 2015	Haleakala	Pan-STARRS 1	·	1.3 km	MPC · JPL
769213	2015 KB_{148}	—	May 24, 2015	Haleakala	Pan-STARRS 1	·	980 m	MPC · JPL
769214	2015 KP_{148}	—	May 24, 2015	Haleakala	Pan-STARRS 1	·	1.4 km	MPC · JPL
769215	2015 KK_{149}	—	April 15, 2015	Mount Lemmon	Mount Lemmon Survey	PHO	680 m	MPC · JPL
769216	2015 KA_{150}	—	May 11, 2015	Mount Lemmon	Mount Lemmon Survey	·	1.0 km	MPC · JPL
769217	2015 KY_{153}	—	October 17, 2012	Haleakala	Pan-STARRS 1	NYS	810 m	MPC · JPL
769218	2015 KQ_{156}	—	May 11, 2015	Haleakala	Pan-STARRS 1	H	460 m	MPC · JPL
769219	2015 KS_{159}	—	March 28, 2015	Haleakala	Pan-STARRS 1	PHO	760 m	MPC · JPL
769220	2015 KF_{164}	—	May 19, 2015	Mount Lemmon	Mount Lemmon Survey	H	420 m	MPC · JPL
769221	2015 KY_{168}	—	January 12, 2008	Kitt Peak	Spacewatch	·	2.2 km	MPC · JPL
769222	2015 KH_{170}	—	August 21, 2008	Kitt Peak	Spacewatch	·	850 m	MPC · JPL
769223	2015 KQ_{170}	—	May 21, 2015	Haleakala	Pan-STARRS 1	PHO	770 m	MPC · JPL
769224	2015 KK_{171}	—	May 25, 2015	Haleakala	Pan-STARRS 1	·	790 m	MPC · JPL
769225	2015 KL_{180}	—	May 18, 2015	Haleakala	Pan-STARRS 1	PHO	630 m	MPC · JPL
769226	2015 KY_{182}	—	May 19, 2015	Haleakala	Pan-STARRS 1	·	2.3 km	MPC · JPL
769227	2015 KD_{185}	—	May 21, 2015	Haleakala	Pan-STARRS 1	·	860 m	MPC · JPL
769228	2015 KX_{185}	—	May 21, 2015	Haleakala	Pan-STARRS 1	·	970 m	MPC · JPL
769229	2015 KS_{187}	—	May 25, 2015	Haleakala	Pan-STARRS 1	V	510 m	MPC · JPL
769230	2015 KU_{188}	—	May 21, 2015	Haleakala	Pan-STARRS 1	H	400 m	MPC · JPL
769231	2015 KH_{189}	—	October 17, 2012	Mount Lemmon	Mount Lemmon Survey	·	2.3 km	MPC · JPL
769232	2015 KG_{190}	—	May 24, 2015	Mount Lemmon	Mount Lemmon Survey	·	1.6 km	MPC · JPL
769233	2015 KD_{192}	—	May 18, 2015	Mount Lemmon	Mount Lemmon Survey	·	2.8 km	MPC · JPL
769234	2015 KJ_{194}	—	May 29, 2015	Haleakala	Pan-STARRS 1	·	540 m	MPC · JPL
769235	2015 KW_{196}	—	May 22, 2015	Haleakala	Pan-STARRS 1	V	470 m	MPC · JPL
769236	2015 KR_{197}	—	May 20, 2015	Mount Lemmon	Mount Lemmon Survey	·	1.1 km	MPC · JPL
769237	2015 KY_{197}	—	May 21, 2015	Haleakala	Pan-STARRS 1	EOS	1.5 km	MPC · JPL
769238	2015 KP_{201}	—	May 21, 2015	Haleakala	Pan-STARRS 1	·	1.9 km	MPC · JPL
769239	2015 KD_{208}	—	May 21, 2015	Haleakala	Pan-STARRS 1	·	760 m	MPC · JPL
769240	2015 KQ_{210}	—	May 25, 2015	Haleakala	Pan-STARRS 1	·	2.5 km	MPC · JPL
769241	2015 KS_{230}	—	May 21, 2015	Haleakala	Pan-STARRS 1	V	440 m	MPC · JPL
769242	2015 KU_{240}	—	May 20, 2015	Cerro Tololo	DECam	·	2.7 km	MPC · JPL
769243	2015 KU_{322}	—	May 18, 2015	Haleakala	Pan-STARRS 1	URS	2.4 km	MPC · JPL
769244	2015 KN_{334}	—	May 21, 2015	Cerro Tololo	DECam	·	2.1 km	MPC · JPL
769245	2015 KF_{343}	—	November 17, 2011	Mount Lemmon	Mount Lemmon Survey	SYL	3.0 km	MPC · JPL
769246	2015 KS_{366}	—	September 30, 2005	Mount Lemmon	Mount Lemmon Survey	·	2.1 km	MPC · JPL
769247	2015 LM_{6}	—	January 31, 2014	Haleakala	Pan-STARRS 1	·	2.2 km	MPC · JPL
769248	2015 LJ_{9}	—	December 2, 2012	Mount Lemmon	Mount Lemmon Survey	LIX	3.1 km	MPC · JPL
769249	2015 LS_{11}	—	June 9, 2015	Haleakala	Pan-STARRS 1	·	1.3 km	MPC · JPL
769250	2015 LA_{22}	—	October 15, 2007	Kitt Peak	Spacewatch	·	950 m	MPC · JPL
769251	2015 LY_{23}	—	March 30, 2015	Haleakala	Pan-STARRS 1	·	620 m	MPC · JPL
769252	2015 LM_{27}	—	August 7, 2008	Kitt Peak	Spacewatch	·	970 m	MPC · JPL
769253	2015 LG_{30}	—	May 9, 2011	Mount Lemmon	Mount Lemmon Survey	NYS	960 m	MPC · JPL
769254	2015 LW_{32}	—	June 13, 2015	Haleakala	Pan-STARRS 1	·	1.2 km	MPC · JPL
769255	2015 LS_{35}	—	August 24, 2011	Haleakala	Pan-STARRS 1	·	1.0 km	MPC · JPL
769256	2015 LD_{36}	—	August 25, 2011	Piszkéstető	K. Sárneczky	ADE	1.4 km	MPC · JPL
769257	2015 LJ_{39}	—	February 7, 2008	Kitt Peak	Spacewatch	T_{j} (2.99)	2.4 km	MPC · JPL
769258	2015 LX_{41}	—	April 24, 2009	Mount Lemmon	Mount Lemmon Survey	·	2.2 km	MPC · JPL
769259	2015 LD_{42}	—	June 2, 2015	Cerro Tololo-DECam	DECam	·	980 m	MPC · JPL
769260	2015 LE_{45}	—	June 13, 2015	Haleakala	Pan-STARRS 1	·	1.3 km	MPC · JPL
769261	2015 LG_{45}	—	June 13, 2015	Haleakala	Pan-STARRS 1	·	1.0 km	MPC · JPL
769262	2015 LP_{51}	—	June 12, 2015	Mount Lemmon	Mount Lemmon Survey	·	2.7 km	MPC · JPL
769263	2015 LY_{52}	—	June 12, 2015	Haleakala	Pan-STARRS 1	EUN	960 m	MPC · JPL
769264	2015 LD_{55}	—	June 14, 2015	Mount Lemmon	Mount Lemmon Survey	·	1.2 km	MPC · JPL
769265	2015 MB_{1}	—	November 26, 2013	Mount Lemmon	Mount Lemmon Survey	H	470 m	MPC · JPL
769266	2015 MJ_{4}	—	May 22, 2015	Haleakala	Pan-STARRS 1	·	620 m	MPC · JPL
769267	2015 MD_{7}	—	April 4, 2014	Mount Lemmon	Mount Lemmon Survey	·	2.0 km	MPC · JPL
769268	2015 MF_{14}	—	August 13, 1999	Kitt Peak	Spacewatch	·	1.1 km	MPC · JPL
769269	2015 MU_{14}	—	October 9, 2012	Haleakala	Pan-STARRS 1	·	1.0 km	MPC · JPL
769270	2015 MA_{20}	—	March 2, 2011	Mount Lemmon	Mount Lemmon Survey	(2076)	820 m	MPC · JPL
769271	2015 MB_{20}	—	December 15, 2007	Mount Lemmon	Mount Lemmon Survey	LIX	2.6 km	MPC · JPL
769272	2015 ME_{20}	—	January 28, 2014	Mount Lemmon	Mount Lemmon Survey	·	2.1 km	MPC · JPL
769273	2015 MF_{25}	—	June 18, 2015	Haleakala	Pan-STARRS 1	·	2.2 km	MPC · JPL
769274	2015 MZ_{25}	—	October 28, 2005	Mount Lemmon	Mount Lemmon Survey	·	990 m	MPC · JPL
769275	2015 MJ_{26}	—	December 25, 2005	Kitt Peak	Spacewatch	V	560 m	MPC · JPL
769276	2015 ME_{32}	—	May 21, 2015	Haleakala	Pan-STARRS 1	V	450 m	MPC · JPL
769277	2015 MH_{33}	—	June 18, 2015	Haleakala	Pan-STARRS 1	·	1.6 km	MPC · JPL
769278	2015 MZ_{36}	—	January 10, 2014	Kitt Peak	Spacewatch	EUN	900 m	MPC · JPL
769279	2015 MA_{38}	—	June 18, 2015	Haleakala	Pan-STARRS 1	·	830 m	MPC · JPL
769280	2015 MW_{40}	—	September 5, 2010	Mount Lemmon	Mount Lemmon Survey	·	2.5 km	MPC · JPL
769281	2015 MU_{45}	—	April 5, 2014	Haleakala	Pan-STARRS 1	EOS	1.5 km	MPC · JPL
769282	2015 MC_{47}	—	June 17, 2015	Haleakala	Pan-STARRS 1	·	1.1 km	MPC · JPL
769283	2015 MY_{52}	—	May 21, 2015	Haleakala	Pan-STARRS 1	·	1.2 km	MPC · JPL
769284	2015 MY_{54}	—	December 16, 2007	Mount Lemmon	Mount Lemmon Survey	·	2.4 km	MPC · JPL
769285	2015 MN_{56}	—	October 30, 2005	Kitt Peak	Spacewatch	·	770 m	MPC · JPL
769286	2015 MG_{64}	—	June 20, 2015	Haleakala	Pan-STARRS 1	·	2.1 km	MPC · JPL
769287	2015 MS_{64}	—	June 20, 2015	Haleakala	Pan-STARRS 1	VER	2.0 km	MPC · JPL
769288 Varadinagypal	2015 MT_{66}	Varadinagypal	April 30, 2015	Roque de los Muchachos	EURONEAR	V	520 m	MPC · JPL
769289	2015 MT_{75}	—	June 16, 2015	Haleakala	Pan-STARRS 1	·	1.1 km	MPC · JPL
769290	2015 MV_{77}	—	February 11, 2014	Mount Lemmon	Mount Lemmon Survey	·	1.2 km	MPC · JPL
769291	2015 MW_{78}	—	April 28, 2014	Haleakala	Pan-STARRS 1	·	2.8 km	MPC · JPL
769292	2015 MN_{80}	—	March 6, 2014	Mount Lemmon	Mount Lemmon Survey	·	860 m	MPC · JPL
769293	2015 MJ_{90}	—	June 21, 2015	Haleakala	Pan-STARRS 1	·	1.3 km	MPC · JPL
769294	2015 MT_{97}	—	January 16, 2009	Mount Lemmon	Mount Lemmon Survey	HNS	880 m	MPC · JPL
769295	2015 MN_{99}	—	January 14, 1996	Kitt Peak	Spacewatch	·	940 m	MPC · JPL
769296	2015 MG_{102}	—	October 23, 2011	Mayhill-ISON	L. Elenin	·	1.3 km	MPC · JPL
769297	2015 MH_{104}	—	June 26, 2015	Haleakala	Pan-STARRS 1	·	2.6 km	MPC · JPL
769298	2015 ML_{104}	—	June 26, 2015	Haleakala	Pan-STARRS 1	·	940 m	MPC · JPL
769299	2015 MU_{104}	—	March 26, 2007	Kitt Peak	Spacewatch	MAS	610 m	MPC · JPL
769300	2015 MV_{106}	—	June 26, 2015	Haleakala	Pan-STARRS 1	·	870 m	MPC · JPL

== 769301–769400 ==
back to top

Designation			Discovery			Properties		Ref
Permanent	Provisional	Named after	Date	Site	Discoverer(s)	Category	Diam.	Ref
769301	2015 MY_{109}	—	April 7, 2002	Cerro Tololo	Deep Ecliptic Survey	·	1.0 km	MPC · JPL
769302	2015 MV_{111}	—	February 28, 2014	Haleakala	Pan-STARRS 1	·	950 m	MPC · JPL
769303	2015 MO_{112}	—	June 26, 2015	Haleakala	Pan-STARRS 1	·	980 m	MPC · JPL
769304	2015 MC_{115}	—	September 1, 2007	Siding Spring	K. Sárneczky, L. Kiss	·	970 m	MPC · JPL
769305	2015 MS_{128}	—	June 27, 2015	Haleakala	Pan-STARRS 2	·	1 km	MPC · JPL
769306	2015 MJ_{134}	—	June 26, 2015	Haleakala	Pan-STARRS 1	·	1.5 km	MPC · JPL
769307	2015 MQ_{136}	—	September 2, 2011	Haleakala	Pan-STARRS 1	·	1.1 km	MPC · JPL
769308	2015 MO_{137}	—	June 26, 2015	Haleakala	Pan-STARRS 1	·	960 m	MPC · JPL
769309	2015 MX_{138}	—	August 10, 2007	Kitt Peak	Spacewatch	(5)	850 m	MPC · JPL
769310	2015 MZ_{138}	—	September 4, 2011	Haleakala	Pan-STARRS 1	·	1.3 km	MPC · JPL
769311	2015 MR_{140}	—	June 12, 2015	Mount Lemmon	Mount Lemmon Survey	·	1.4 km	MPC · JPL
769312	2015 MY_{140}	—	January 16, 2013	Mount Lemmon	Mount Lemmon Survey	·	1.4 km	MPC · JPL
769313	2015 MB_{141}	—	June 18, 2015	Haleakala	Pan-STARRS 1	V	480 m	MPC · JPL
769314	2015 MM_{142}	—	September 4, 2011	Haleakala	Pan-STARRS 1	·	1.0 km	MPC · JPL
769315	2015 MR_{142}	—	October 18, 2012	Haleakala	Pan-STARRS 1	·	950 m	MPC · JPL
769316	2015 MA_{144}	—	January 5, 2013	Mount Lemmon	Mount Lemmon Survey	·	920 m	MPC · JPL
769317	2015 MF_{145}	—	May 25, 2014	Haleakala	Pan-STARRS 1	·	1.5 km	MPC · JPL
769318	2015 MV_{145}	—	February 22, 2014	Kitt Peak	Spacewatch	·	860 m	MPC · JPL
769319	2015 MS_{146}	—	October 9, 2007	Kitt Peak	Spacewatch	·	1.2 km	MPC · JPL
769320	2015 MU_{151}	—	June 16, 2015	Haleakala	Pan-STARRS 1	·	1.5 km	MPC · JPL
769321	2015 MQ_{152}	—	June 20, 2015	Mount Lemmon	Mount Lemmon Survey	PHO	720 m	MPC · JPL
769322	2015 MG_{157}	—	April 29, 2014	Cerro Tololo	DECam	·	2.7 km	MPC · JPL
769323	2015 MD_{163}	—	June 28, 2015	Haleakala	Pan-STARRS 1	H	300 m	MPC · JPL
769324	2015 MB_{167}	—	June 26, 2015	Haleakala	Pan-STARRS 1	HOF	1.9 km	MPC · JPL
769325	2015 ME_{168}	—	June 22, 2015	Haleakala	Pan-STARRS 1	·	2.0 km	MPC · JPL
769326	2015 ML_{170}	—	June 18, 2015	Haleakala	Pan-STARRS 1	·	2.1 km	MPC · JPL
769327	2015 ME_{172}	—	June 26, 2015	Haleakala	Pan-STARRS 1	·	2.2 km	MPC · JPL
769328	2015 MR_{174}	—	June 22, 2015	Haleakala	Pan-STARRS 1	·	1.2 km	MPC · JPL
769329	2015 MO_{175}	—	June 26, 2015	Haleakala	Pan-STARRS 1	·	750 m	MPC · JPL
769330	2015 MW_{175}	—	June 27, 2015	Haleakala	Pan-STARRS 1	·	1.3 km	MPC · JPL
769331	2015 MJ_{176}	—	June 17, 2015	Haleakala	Pan-STARRS 1	·	1.3 km	MPC · JPL
769332	2015 ML_{176}	—	June 28, 2015	Haleakala	Pan-STARRS 1	MAR	910 m	MPC · JPL
769333	2015 MV_{176}	—	May 21, 2015	Haleakala	Pan-STARRS 1	·	2.5 km	MPC · JPL
769334	2015 ML_{180}	—	June 22, 2015	Haleakala	Pan-STARRS 1	·	2.4 km	MPC · JPL
769335	2015 MB_{182}	—	June 17, 2015	Haleakala	Pan-STARRS 1	·	2.4 km	MPC · JPL
769336	2015 MP_{194}	—	June 23, 2015	Haleakala	Pan-STARRS 1	·	890 m	MPC · JPL
769337	2015 MT_{194}	—	June 17, 2015	Haleakala	Pan-STARRS 1	HNS	780 m	MPC · JPL
769338	2015 MU_{195}	—	June 18, 2015	Haleakala	Pan-STARRS 1	·	900 m	MPC · JPL
769339	2015 NV_{2}	—	November 25, 2011	Haleakala	Pan-STARRS 1	·	1.6 km	MPC · JPL
769340	2015 NZ_{15}	—	June 27, 2015	Haleakala	Pan-STARRS 1	·	1.2 km	MPC · JPL
769341	2015 NW_{27}	—	October 1, 2011	Mount Lemmon	Mount Lemmon Survey	·	1.3 km	MPC · JPL
769342	2015 NE_{29}	—	July 9, 2015	Haleakala	Pan-STARRS 1	EUN	780 m	MPC · JPL
769343	2015 NB_{31}	—	July 12, 2015	Haleakala	Pan-STARRS 1	·	1.2 km	MPC · JPL
769344	2015 NV_{32}	—	October 1, 1995	Kitt Peak	Spacewatch	·	1.4 km	MPC · JPL
769345	2015 NG_{34}	—	July 7, 2015	Haleakala	Pan-STARRS 1	·	2.6 km	MPC · JPL
769346	2015 NN_{35}	—	March 28, 2008	Mount Lemmon	Mount Lemmon Survey	·	2.5 km	MPC · JPL
769347	2015 NH_{36}	—	July 14, 2015	Haleakala	Pan-STARRS 1	V	490 m	MPC · JPL
769348	2015 OX	—	August 23, 2011	Haleakala	Pan-STARRS 1	·	940 m	MPC · JPL
769349	2015 OZ	—	June 15, 2015	Mount Lemmon	Mount Lemmon Survey	·	1.7 km	MPC · JPL
769350	2015 OR_{3}	—	June 27, 2015	Haleakala	Pan-STARRS 1	·	2.7 km	MPC · JPL
769351	2015 OR_{6}	—	April 30, 2014	Haleakala	Pan-STARRS 1	EOS	1.5 km	MPC · JPL
769352	2015 OA_{10}	—	September 20, 2007	Catalina	CSS	(5)	1.1 km	MPC · JPL
769353	2015 OA_{13}	—	October 29, 2008	Kitt Peak	Spacewatch	·	1.0 km	MPC · JPL
769354	2015 OA_{14}	—	July 18, 2015	Haleakala	Pan-STARRS 1	MAS	610 m	MPC · JPL
769355	2015 OO_{17}	—	October 11, 2012	Haleakala	Pan-STARRS 1	·	660 m	MPC · JPL
769356	2015 OY_{17}	—	June 29, 2015	Haleakala	Pan-STARRS 1	·	1.3 km	MPC · JPL
769357	2015 OZ_{24}	—	July 12, 2015	Haleakala	Pan-STARRS 1	·	1.4 km	MPC · JPL
769358	2015 OO_{25}	—	March 12, 2010	Mount Lemmon	Mount Lemmon Survey	·	1 km	MPC · JPL
769359	2015 OP_{25}	—	October 29, 2008	Kitt Peak	Spacewatch	·	910 m	MPC · JPL
769360	2015 OO_{26}	—	July 1, 2011	Haleakala	Pan-STARRS 1	·	1.2 km	MPC · JPL
769361	2015 OR_{27}	—	July 23, 2015	Haleakala	Pan-STARRS 1	·	1.4 km	MPC · JPL
769362	2015 OV_{28}	—	July 23, 2015	Haleakala	Pan-STARRS 1	·	930 m	MPC · JPL
769363	2015 OQ_{30}	—	July 23, 2015	Haleakala	Pan-STARRS 2	JUN	700 m	MPC · JPL
769364	2015 OH_{33}	—	October 19, 2011	Mount Lemmon	Mount Lemmon Survey	·	1.2 km	MPC · JPL
769365	2015 OQ_{33}	—	July 18, 2015	Haleakala	Pan-STARRS 1	·	850 m	MPC · JPL
769366	2015 OR_{33}	—	January 31, 2006	Kitt Peak	Spacewatch	·	920 m	MPC · JPL
769367	2015 OK_{34}	—	February 10, 2014	Mount Lemmon	Mount Lemmon Survey	·	1.1 km	MPC · JPL
769368	2015 OR_{35}	—	July 26, 2015	Haleakala	Pan-STARRS 1	·	1.3 km	MPC · JPL
769369	2015 OE_{40}	—	May 6, 2006	Mount Lemmon	Mount Lemmon Survey	(5)	1.1 km	MPC · JPL
769370	2015 OW_{41}	—	July 23, 2015	Haleakala	Pan-STARRS 1	·	1.1 km	MPC · JPL
769371	2015 OG_{43}	—	November 30, 2003	Kitt Peak	Spacewatch	·	1.1 km	MPC · JPL
769372	2015 OU_{43}	—	July 24, 2015	Haleakala	Pan-STARRS 1	·	980 m	MPC · JPL
769373	2015 OM_{44}	—	November 22, 2011	Catalina	CSS	DOR	1.9 km	MPC · JPL
769374	2015 OW_{45}	—	February 20, 2014	Mount Lemmon	Mount Lemmon Survey	·	1.7 km	MPC · JPL
769375	2015 OZ_{45}	—	December 22, 2012	Haleakala	Pan-STARRS 1	·	1.0 km	MPC · JPL
769376	2015 OO_{46}	—	June 26, 2015	Haleakala	Pan-STARRS 1	·	870 m	MPC · JPL
769377	2015 OQ_{46}	—	September 11, 2007	Mount Lemmon	Mount Lemmon Survey	·	1.1 km	MPC · JPL
769378	2015 OV_{49}	—	October 1, 2005	Kitt Peak	Spacewatch	EOS	1.4 km	MPC · JPL
769379	2015 OW_{49}	—	July 26, 2015	Haleakala	Pan-STARRS 1	·	1.2 km	MPC · JPL
769380	2015 ON_{53}	—	June 17, 2015	Haleakala	Pan-STARRS 1	·	1.4 km	MPC · JPL
769381	2015 OW_{53}	—	April 23, 2014	Mount Lemmon	Mount Lemmon Survey	·	960 m	MPC · JPL
769382	2015 OO_{54}	—	July 26, 2015	Haleakala	Pan-STARRS 1	·	910 m	MPC · JPL
769383	2015 OS_{56}	—	November 20, 2003	Apache Point	SDSS	HNS	960 m	MPC · JPL
769384	2015 OS_{60}	—	January 21, 2013	Mount Lemmon	Mount Lemmon Survey	·	1.5 km	MPC · JPL
769385	2015 OA_{62}	—	May 8, 2014	Mount Lemmon	Mount Lemmon Survey	·	1.7 km	MPC · JPL
769386	2015 OY_{62}	—	October 23, 2011	Haleakala	Pan-STARRS 1	EUN	800 m	MPC · JPL
769387	2015 OA_{65}	—	July 26, 2015	Haleakala	Pan-STARRS 1	·	1.1 km	MPC · JPL
769388	2015 OU_{65}	—	December 5, 2012	Mount Lemmon	Mount Lemmon Survey	·	1.3 km	MPC · JPL
769389	2015 OY_{66}	—	January 2, 2012	Mount Lemmon	Mount Lemmon Survey	EUP	2.2 km	MPC · JPL
769390	2015 OH_{68}	—	January 10, 2013	Haleakala	Pan-STARRS 1	·	1.2 km	MPC · JPL
769391	2015 OA_{75}	—	October 31, 2011	Mount Lemmon	Mount Lemmon Survey	·	1.1 km	MPC · JPL
769392	2015 OP_{76}	—	December 18, 2007	Mount Lemmon	Mount Lemmon Survey	·	1.1 km	MPC · JPL
769393	2015 OR_{81}	—	July 19, 2015	Haleakala	Pan-STARRS 1	·	1.1 km	MPC · JPL
769394	2015 OT_{84}	—	February 28, 2014	Haleakala	Pan-STARRS 1	EUN	800 m	MPC · JPL
769395	2015 OB_{85}	—	January 16, 2013	Mount Lemmon	Mount Lemmon Survey	·	1.1 km	MPC · JPL
769396	2015 OM_{86}	—	July 25, 2015	Haleakala	Pan-STARRS 1	·	1.4 km	MPC · JPL
769397	2015 OH_{87}	—	July 25, 2015	Haleakala	Pan-STARRS 1	·	1.1 km	MPC · JPL
769398	2015 OU_{87}	—	July 25, 2015	Haleakala	Pan-STARRS 1	·	1.2 km	MPC · JPL
769399	2015 OX_{87}	—	July 19, 2015	Haleakala	Pan-STARRS 1	EOS	1.4 km	MPC · JPL
769400	2015 OS_{90}	—	December 30, 2007	Kitt Peak	Spacewatch	·	1.2 km	MPC · JPL

== 769401–769500 ==
back to top

Designation			Discovery			Properties		Ref
Permanent	Provisional	Named after	Date	Site	Discoverer(s)	Category	Diam.	Ref
769401	2015 OV_{91}	—	July 19, 2015	Haleakala	Pan-STARRS 2	·	1.0 km	MPC · JPL
769402	2015 OA_{95}	—	March 20, 2014	Mount Lemmon	Mount Lemmon Survey	·	1.2 km	MPC · JPL
769403	2015 OT_{96}	—	September 11, 2010	Mount Lemmon	Mount Lemmon Survey	·	1.3 km	MPC · JPL
769404	2015 OC_{97}	—	March 18, 2010	Kitt Peak	Spacewatch	·	1.2 km	MPC · JPL
769405	2015 OF_{98}	—	October 20, 2011	Mount Lemmon	Mount Lemmon Survey	AGN	950 m	MPC · JPL
769406	2015 ON_{98}	—	November 3, 2011	Kitt Peak	Spacewatch	·	1.3 km	MPC · JPL
769407	2015 OV_{98}	—	September 3, 2010	Mount Lemmon	Mount Lemmon Survey	·	1.6 km	MPC · JPL
769408	2015 OY_{99}	—	October 24, 2011	Catalina	CSS	·	1.3 km	MPC · JPL
769409	2015 OA_{100}	—	July 25, 2015	Haleakala	Pan-STARRS 1	MAR	770 m	MPC · JPL
769410	2015 OR_{100}	—	July 25, 2015	Haleakala	Pan-STARRS 1	·	1.2 km	MPC · JPL
769411	2015 OQ_{101}	—	May 23, 2014	Haleakala	Pan-STARRS 1	615	980 m	MPC · JPL
769412	2015 OA_{102}	—	November 25, 2011	Haleakala	Pan-STARRS 1	EUN	840 m	MPC · JPL
769413	2015 OD_{103}	—	July 26, 2015	Haleakala	Pan-STARRS 1	·	1.5 km	MPC · JPL
769414	2015 OM_{103}	—	July 26, 2015	Haleakala	Pan-STARRS 1	·	1.0 km	MPC · JPL
769415	2015 OB_{105}	—	April 4, 2014	Haleakala	Pan-STARRS 1	·	1.2 km	MPC · JPL
769416	2015 OC_{107}	—	July 24, 2015	Haleakala	Pan-STARRS 1	·	1.0 km	MPC · JPL
769417	2015 OD_{107}	—	July 23, 2015	Haleakala	Pan-STARRS 1	·	960 m	MPC · JPL
769418	2015 OH_{107}	—	July 25, 2015	Haleakala	Pan-STARRS 1	EUN	920 m	MPC · JPL
769419	2015 OK_{107}	—	October 24, 1995	Kitt Peak	Spacewatch	·	1.3 km	MPC · JPL
769420	2015 OQ_{107}	—	July 25, 2015	Haleakala	Pan-STARRS 1	·	1.4 km	MPC · JPL
769421	2015 OU_{114}	—	July 25, 2015	Haleakala	Pan-STARRS 1	·	1.1 km	MPC · JPL
769422	2015 ON_{115}	—	December 30, 2008	Mount Lemmon	Mount Lemmon Survey	·	1.3 km	MPC · JPL
769423	2015 OY_{117}	—	October 1, 2011	Piszkéstető	K. Sárneczky	EUN	960 m	MPC · JPL
769424	2015 OX_{124}	—	July 24, 2015	Haleakala	Pan-STARRS 1	3:2 · (3561)	4.2 km	MPC · JPL
769425	2015 OE_{133}	—	July 25, 2015	Haleakala	Pan-STARRS 1	·	1.9 km	MPC · JPL
769426	2015 OX_{136}	—	July 24, 2015	Haleakala	Pan-STARRS 1	·	1.1 km	MPC · JPL
769427	2015 OX_{137}	—	July 19, 2015	Haleakala	Pan-STARRS 1	·	940 m	MPC · JPL
769428	2015 OJ_{138}	—	July 25, 2015	Haleakala	Pan-STARRS 1	·	1.4 km	MPC · JPL
769429	2015 OM_{138}	—	July 25, 2015	Haleakala	Pan-STARRS 1	·	1.2 km	MPC · JPL
769430	2015 OD_{139}	—	July 19, 2015	Haleakala	Pan-STARRS 1	·	1.4 km	MPC · JPL
769431	2015 OF_{139}	—	July 23, 2015	Haleakala	Pan-STARRS 1	·	1.5 km	MPC · JPL
769432	2015 OX_{140}	—	July 26, 2015	Haleakala	Pan-STARRS 1	HNS	760 m	MPC · JPL
769433	2015 OY_{140}	—	July 28, 2015	Haleakala	Pan-STARRS 1	·	1.5 km	MPC · JPL
769434	2015 OO_{151}	—	February 26, 2014	Haleakala	Pan-STARRS 1	·	1 km	MPC · JPL
769435	2015 OP_{151}	—	July 23, 2015	Haleakala	Pan-STARRS 1	·	1.1 km	MPC · JPL
769436	2015 ON_{152}	—	July 25, 2015	Haleakala	Pan-STARRS 1	·	1.5 km	MPC · JPL
769437	2015 OP_{162}	—	April 2, 2014	Mount Lemmon	Mount Lemmon Survey	·	1.0 km	MPC · JPL
769438	2015 OS_{167}	—	July 24, 2015	Haleakala	Pan-STARRS 1	·	950 m	MPC · JPL
769439	2015 OV_{171}	—	November 6, 2007	Kitt Peak	Spacewatch	·	1.3 km	MPC · JPL
769440	2015 PH_{1}	—	August 24, 2011	La Sagra	OAM	·	1.1 km	MPC · JPL
769441	2015 PZ_{10}	—	March 26, 2011	Haleakala	Pan-STARRS 1	·	610 m	MPC · JPL
769442	2015 PC_{13}	—	June 20, 2015	Haleakala	Pan-STARRS 1	·	820 m	MPC · JPL
769443	2015 PQ_{13}	—	August 24, 2011	Haleakala	Pan-STARRS 1	·	960 m	MPC · JPL
769444	2015 PQ_{18}	—	September 19, 2003	Kitt Peak	Spacewatch	·	950 m	MPC · JPL
769445	2015 PP_{19}	—	August 30, 2011	Haleakala	Pan-STARRS 1	·	1.2 km	MPC · JPL
769446	2015 PE_{20}	—	July 24, 2015	Haleakala	Pan-STARRS 1	·	1.1 km	MPC · JPL
769447	2015 PD_{35}	—	July 25, 2015	Haleakala	Pan-STARRS 1	PHO	780 m	MPC · JPL
769448	2015 PN_{41}	—	July 24, 2015	Haleakala	Pan-STARRS 1	·	920 m	MPC · JPL
769449	2015 PQ_{41}	—	July 19, 2015	Haleakala	Pan-STARRS 2	·	1.1 km	MPC · JPL
769450	2015 PU_{41}	—	April 2, 2011	Kitt Peak	Spacewatch	·	540 m	MPC · JPL
769451	2015 PH_{43}	—	July 19, 2015	Haleakala	Pan-STARRS 2	EUN	930 m	MPC · JPL
769452	2015 PO_{51}	—	December 14, 2007	Kitt Peak	Spacewatch	·	1 km	MPC · JPL
769453	2015 PU_{53}	—	September 15, 2007	Mount Lemmon	Mount Lemmon Survey	·	1.2 km	MPC · JPL
769454	2015 PQ_{59}	—	May 23, 2014	Mount Lemmon	Mount Lemmon Survey	·	2.5 km	MPC · JPL
769455	2015 PR_{61}	—	October 25, 2011	Haleakala	Pan-STARRS 1	JUN	870 m	MPC · JPL
769456	2015 PK_{63}	—	January 22, 2013	Mount Lemmon	Mount Lemmon Survey	·	1.1 km	MPC · JPL
769457	2015 PY_{64}	—	June 26, 2015	Haleakala	Pan-STARRS 1	·	2.3 km	MPC · JPL
769458	2015 PP_{66}	—	September 4, 2011	Haleakala	Pan-STARRS 1	·	1.5 km	MPC · JPL
769459	2015 PB_{67}	—	October 11, 2012	Haleakala	Pan-STARRS 1	NYS	840 m	MPC · JPL
769460	2015 PN_{67}	—	July 19, 2015	Haleakala	Pan-STARRS 1	·	810 m	MPC · JPL
769461	2015 PV_{69}	—	June 26, 2015	Haleakala	Pan-STARRS 1	HOF	2.1 km	MPC · JPL
769462	2015 PG_{72}	—	October 20, 2007	Mount Lemmon	Mount Lemmon Survey	MIS	1.6 km	MPC · JPL
769463	2015 PQ_{74}	—	June 22, 2015	Haleakala	Pan-STARRS 1	·	880 m	MPC · JPL
769464	2015 PQ_{76}	—	June 18, 2015	Haleakala	Pan-STARRS 1	·	850 m	MPC · JPL
769465	2015 PX_{76}	—	July 19, 2015	Haleakala	Pan-STARRS 1	·	620 m	MPC · JPL
769466	2015 PC_{79}	—	July 19, 2015	Haleakala	Pan-STARRS 2	·	970 m	MPC · JPL
769467	2015 PD_{87}	—	August 10, 2015	Haleakala	Pan-STARRS 1	·	980 m	MPC · JPL
769468	2015 PU_{87}	—	June 26, 2015	Haleakala	Pan-STARRS 1	·	1.1 km	MPC · JPL
769469	2015 PT_{91}	—	January 28, 2014	Kitt Peak	Spacewatch	NYS	910 m	MPC · JPL
769470	2015 PT_{100}	—	March 28, 2008	Mount Lemmon	Mount Lemmon Survey	·	1.8 km	MPC · JPL
769471	2015 PO_{101}	—	February 2, 2014	Mount Lemmon	Mount Lemmon Survey	·	1.0 km	MPC · JPL
769472	2015 PJ_{103}	—	August 10, 2015	Haleakala	Pan-STARRS 1	·	860 m	MPC · JPL
769473	2015 PN_{104}	—	November 7, 2005	Mauna Kea	A. Boattini	·	2.8 km	MPC · JPL
769474	2015 PA_{105}	—	June 20, 2015	Haleakala	Pan-STARRS 1	·	2.1 km	MPC · JPL
769475	2015 PF_{105}	—	June 26, 2015	Haleakala	Pan-STARRS 1	·	1.3 km	MPC · JPL
769476	2015 PL_{105}	—	January 15, 2007	Mauna Kea	P. A. Wiegert	KOR	1.1 km	MPC · JPL
769477	2015 PH_{107}	—	January 13, 2013	Mount Lemmon	Mount Lemmon Survey	·	920 m	MPC · JPL
769478	2015 PO_{119}	—	December 31, 2008	Mount Lemmon	Mount Lemmon Survey	·	1.2 km	MPC · JPL
769479	2015 PZ_{119}	—	September 3, 2010	Mount Lemmon	Mount Lemmon Survey	EOS	1.2 km	MPC · JPL
769480	2015 PK_{123}	—	January 7, 2014	Kitt Peak	Spacewatch	(2076)	640 m	MPC · JPL
769481	2015 PT_{126}	—	December 12, 1998	Kitt Peak	Spacewatch	·	1.1 km	MPC · JPL
769482	2015 PW_{136}	—	August 10, 2015	Haleakala	Pan-STARRS 1	·	1.4 km	MPC · JPL
769483	2015 PU_{141}	—	May 23, 2014	Haleakala	Pan-STARRS 1	·	2.2 km	MPC · JPL
769484	2015 PT_{144}	—	August 10, 2015	Haleakala	Pan-STARRS 1	·	720 m	MPC · JPL
769485	2015 PA_{148}	—	April 29, 2014	Haleakala	Pan-STARRS 1	AGN	940 m	MPC · JPL
769486	2015 PW_{152}	—	September 4, 2010	Mount Lemmon	Mount Lemmon Survey	·	1.6 km	MPC · JPL
769487	2015 PQ_{155}	—	June 17, 2015	Haleakala	Pan-STARRS 1	NYS	820 m	MPC · JPL
769488	2015 PT_{163}	—	August 31, 2011	Haleakala	Pan-STARRS 1	·	1.0 km	MPC · JPL
769489	2015 PS_{164}	—	July 19, 2015	Haleakala	Pan-STARRS 2	·	1.1 km	MPC · JPL
769490	2015 PQ_{166}	—	October 10, 2007	Mount Lemmon	Mount Lemmon Survey	·	1.2 km	MPC · JPL
769491	2015 PK_{168}	—	August 10, 2015	Haleakala	Pan-STARRS 1	·	880 m	MPC · JPL
769492	2015 PM_{168}	—	July 14, 2015	Haleakala	Pan-STARRS 1	·	1.3 km	MPC · JPL
769493	2015 PN_{172}	—	August 10, 2015	Haleakala	Pan-STARRS 1	·	1.0 km	MPC · JPL
769494	2015 PO_{173}	—	June 25, 2015	Haleakala	Pan-STARRS 1	MAR	840 m	MPC · JPL
769495	2015 PB_{175}	—	August 10, 2015	Haleakala	Pan-STARRS 1	·	870 m	MPC · JPL
769496	2015 PA_{177}	—	September 10, 2007	Mount Lemmon	Mount Lemmon Survey	KON	1.4 km	MPC · JPL
769497	2015 PA_{178}	—	March 2, 2006	Kitt Peak	Spacewatch	RAF	600 m	MPC · JPL
769498	2015 PK_{179}	—	April 2, 2014	Mount Lemmon	Mount Lemmon Survey	·	1.3 km	MPC · JPL
769499	2015 PL_{180}	—	March 12, 2014	Mount Lemmon	Mount Lemmon Survey	·	1.1 km	MPC · JPL
769500	2015 PR_{185}	—	August 10, 2015	Haleakala	Pan-STARRS 1	·	1.2 km	MPC · JPL

== 769501–769600 ==
back to top

Designation			Discovery			Properties		Ref
Permanent	Provisional	Named after	Date	Site	Discoverer(s)	Category	Diam.	Ref
769501	2015 PO_{188}	—	December 23, 2012	Haleakala	Pan-STARRS 1	·	1.2 km	MPC · JPL
769502	2015 PX_{191}	—	December 22, 2012	Haleakala	Pan-STARRS 1	·	800 m	MPC · JPL
769503	2015 PO_{194}	—	August 10, 2015	Haleakala	Pan-STARRS 1	·	1.1 km	MPC · JPL
769504	2015 PQ_{194}	—	August 10, 2015	Haleakala	Pan-STARRS 1	PHO	610 m	MPC · JPL
769505	2015 PK_{196}	—	July 24, 2015	Haleakala	Pan-STARRS 1	·	860 m	MPC · JPL
769506	2015 PH_{201}	—	June 17, 2015	Haleakala	Pan-STARRS 1	·	970 m	MPC · JPL
769507	2015 PH_{204}	—	October 1, 2011	Kitt Peak	Spacewatch	·	1.3 km	MPC · JPL
769508	2015 PU_{207}	—	October 8, 2007	Mount Lemmon	Mount Lemmon Survey	·	1.1 km	MPC · JPL
769509	2015 PZ_{209}	—	January 5, 2013	Kitt Peak	Spacewatch	HNS	1 km	MPC · JPL
769510	2015 PC_{211}	—	August 10, 2015	Haleakala	Pan-STARRS 1	·	980 m	MPC · JPL
769511	2015 PW_{212}	—	August 10, 2015	Haleakala	Pan-STARRS 1	·	1.0 km	MPC · JPL
769512	2015 PX_{212}	—	October 25, 2011	Haleakala	Pan-STARRS 1	·	1.2 km	MPC · JPL
769513	2015 PK_{213}	—	May 1, 2014	Mount Lemmon	Mount Lemmon Survey	MAR	860 m	MPC · JPL
769514	2015 PP_{213}	—	October 25, 2005	Kitt Peak	Spacewatch	·	2.1 km	MPC · JPL
769515	2015 PJ_{215}	—	January 7, 2013	Kitt Peak	Spacewatch	HNS	920 m	MPC · JPL
769516	2015 PB_{216}	—	January 10, 2013	Haleakala	Pan-STARRS 1	·	1.8 km	MPC · JPL
769517	2015 PL_{219}	—	December 16, 2012	ESA OGS	ESA OGS	·	1.2 km	MPC · JPL
769518	2015 PK_{220}	—	August 10, 2015	Haleakala	Pan-STARRS 1	·	970 m	MPC · JPL
769519	2015 PT_{220}	—	October 24, 2011	Haleakala	Pan-STARRS 1	·	2.1 km	MPC · JPL
769520	2015 PS_{224}	—	May 18, 2015	Haleakala	Pan-STARRS 1	·	1.2 km	MPC · JPL
769521	2015 PO_{225}	—	December 1, 2003	Kitt Peak	Spacewatch	HNS	960 m	MPC · JPL
769522	2015 PU_{225}	—	August 10, 2015	Haleakala	Pan-STARRS 1	·	1.4 km	MPC · JPL
769523	2015 PC_{245}	—	July 24, 2015	Haleakala	Pan-STARRS 1	·	1.2 km	MPC · JPL
769524	2015 PH_{246}	—	September 18, 2011	Mount Lemmon	Mount Lemmon Survey	·	1.1 km	MPC · JPL
769525	2015 PM_{247}	—	October 22, 2012	Haleakala	Pan-STARRS 1	·	1.0 km	MPC · JPL
769526	2015 PJ_{260}	—	February 8, 2002	Kitt Peak	Spacewatch	EUP	3.0 km	MPC · JPL
769527	2015 PS_{266}	—	June 18, 2015	Haleakala	Pan-STARRS 1	·	890 m	MPC · JPL
769528	2015 PD_{271}	—	July 28, 2015	Haleakala	Pan-STARRS 1	·	1.1 km	MPC · JPL
769529	2015 PL_{274}	—	January 1, 2008	Kitt Peak	Spacewatch	GEF	870 m	MPC · JPL
769530	2015 PW_{275}	—	August 11, 2015	Haleakala	Pan-STARRS 1	·	960 m	MPC · JPL
769531	2015 PW_{281}	—	April 4, 2014	Haleakala	Pan-STARRS 1	·	890 m	MPC · JPL
769532	2015 PL_{282}	—	January 10, 2013	Haleakala	Pan-STARRS 1	HNS	890 m	MPC · JPL
769533	2015 PB_{285}	—	September 17, 2010	Mount Lemmon	Mount Lemmon Survey	·	2.1 km	MPC · JPL
769534	2015 PF_{286}	—	October 28, 2011	Mount Lemmon	Mount Lemmon Survey	·	1.3 km	MPC · JPL
769535	2015 PN_{286}	—	September 24, 2011	Haleakala	Pan-STARRS 1	·	1.2 km	MPC · JPL
769536	2015 PW_{295}	—	January 20, 2013	Kitt Peak	Spacewatch	·	1.0 km	MPC · JPL
769537	2015 PE_{296}	—	August 13, 2015	Haleakala	Pan-STARRS 1	(5)	1.2 km	MPC · JPL
769538	2015 PQ_{297}	—	October 25, 2011	Haleakala	Pan-STARRS 1	·	1.2 km	MPC · JPL
769539	2015 PQ_{299}	—	February 26, 2014	Haleakala	Pan-STARRS 1	MIS	2.0 km	MPC · JPL
769540	2015 PD_{301}	—	May 8, 2011	Catalina	CSS	·	680 m	MPC · JPL
769541	2015 PM_{304}	—	August 13, 2015	Haleakala	Pan-STARRS 1	·	1.8 km	MPC · JPL
769542	2015 PL_{306}	—	July 23, 2015	Haleakala	Pan-STARRS 1	·	1.1 km	MPC · JPL
769543	2015 PS_{312}	—	August 12, 2015	Haleakala	Pan-STARRS 1	H	350 m	MPC · JPL
769544	2015 PS_{313}	—	August 12, 2015	Haleakala	Pan-STARRS 1	·	1.0 km	MPC · JPL
769545	2015 PV_{313}	—	September 7, 2002	Campo Imperatore	CINEOS	EUN	970 m	MPC · JPL
769546	2015 PV_{315}	—	February 14, 2013	Haleakala	Pan-STARRS 1	·	1.6 km	MPC · JPL
769547	2015 PJ_{316}	—	April 30, 2014	Haleakala	Pan-STARRS 1	KOR	1.0 km	MPC · JPL
769548	2015 PJ_{317}	—	April 29, 2014	Haleakala	Pan-STARRS 1	·	1.5 km	MPC · JPL
769549	2015 PL_{320}	—	December 30, 2007	Mount Lemmon	Mount Lemmon Survey	·	1.3 km	MPC · JPL
769550	2015 PA_{322}	—	February 27, 2014	Kitt Peak	Spacewatch	BRG	1.0 km	MPC · JPL
769551	2015 PD_{322}	—	August 14, 2015	Haleakala	Pan-STARRS 1	AGN	810 m	MPC · JPL
769552	2015 PR_{323}	—	August 8, 2015	Haleakala	Pan-STARRS 2	·	990 m	MPC · JPL
769553	2015 PW_{327}	—	January 20, 2013	Mount Lemmon	Mount Lemmon Survey	·	930 m	MPC · JPL
769554	2015 PH_{332}	—	August 14, 2015	Haleakala	Pan-STARRS 1	·	560 m	MPC · JPL
769555	2015 PF_{337}	—	August 14, 2015	Haleakala	Pan-STARRS 1	·	870 m	MPC · JPL
769556	2015 PE_{340}	—	August 5, 2015	Palomar	Palomar Transient Factory	BAR	1.1 km	MPC · JPL
769557	2015 PW_{340}	—	August 11, 2015	Haleakala	Pan-STARRS 1	·	1.1 km	MPC · JPL
769558	2015 PH_{341}	—	August 14, 2015	Haleakala	Pan-STARRS 1	·	1.3 km	MPC · JPL
769559	2015 PG_{342}	—	August 13, 2015	Haleakala	Pan-STARRS 1	EUN	810 m	MPC · JPL
769560	2015 PA_{343}	—	August 13, 2015	Haleakala	Pan-STARRS 1	MAR	770 m	MPC · JPL
769561	2015 PO_{345}	—	August 14, 2015	Haleakala	Pan-STARRS 1	·	1.4 km	MPC · JPL
769562	2015 PE_{368}	—	August 10, 2015	Haleakala	Pan-STARRS 1	(5)	890 m	MPC · JPL
769563	2015 QG_{6}	—	July 23, 2015	Haleakala	Pan-STARRS 1	·	1.2 km	MPC · JPL
769564	2015 QR_{6}	—	September 9, 2011	Kitt Peak	Spacewatch	·	1.1 km	MPC · JPL
769565	2015 QJ_{7}	—	June 27, 2015	Haleakala	Pan-STARRS 1	·	1.2 km	MPC · JPL
769566	2015 QG_{8}	—	January 23, 2014	Mount Lemmon	Mount Lemmon Survey	·	910 m	MPC · JPL
769567	2015 QY_{12}	—	May 28, 2014	Haleakala	Pan-STARRS 1	·	1.4 km	MPC · JPL
769568	2015 QF_{13}	—	August 21, 2015	Haleakala	Pan-STARRS 1	·	1.3 km	MPC · JPL
769569	2015 QM_{13}	—	August 20, 2015	Kitt Peak	Spacewatch	·	830 m	MPC · JPL
769570	2015 QP_{13}	—	October 18, 2011	Mount Lemmon	Mount Lemmon Survey	·	1.2 km	MPC · JPL
769571	2015 QF_{14}	—	August 21, 2015	Haleakala	Pan-STARRS 1	·	1 km	MPC · JPL
769572	2015 QJ_{14}	—	May 21, 2014	Haleakala	Pan-STARRS 1	·	780 m	MPC · JPL
769573	2015 QV_{14}	—	September 27, 2003	Kitt Peak	Spacewatch	·	690 m	MPC · JPL
769574	2015 QE_{15}	—	January 18, 2009	Kitt Peak	Spacewatch	·	1.1 km	MPC · JPL
769575	2015 QB_{16}	—	November 2, 2007	Kitt Peak	Spacewatch	·	1.2 km	MPC · JPL
769576	2015 QK_{16}	—	August 21, 2015	Haleakala	Pan-STARRS 1	KOR	1.1 km	MPC · JPL
769577	2015 QM_{16}	—	February 8, 2013	Haleakala	Pan-STARRS 1	·	1.1 km	MPC · JPL
769578	2015 QP_{16}	—	August 21, 2015	Haleakala	Pan-STARRS 1	HNS	770 m	MPC · JPL
769579	2015 QD_{17}	—	September 17, 2010	Mount Lemmon	Mount Lemmon Survey	·	2.1 km	MPC · JPL
769580	2015 QG_{18}	—	August 21, 2015	Haleakala	Pan-STARRS 1	·	1.4 km	MPC · JPL
769581	2015 QR_{18}	—	August 21, 2015	Haleakala	Pan-STARRS 1	EOS	1.4 km	MPC · JPL
769582	2015 QV_{18}	—	June 24, 2014	Haleakala	Pan-STARRS 1	GEF	880 m	MPC · JPL
769583	2015 QC_{19}	—	June 24, 2014	Haleakala	Pan-STARRS 1	·	1.7 km	MPC · JPL
769584 Pteancu	2015 QD_{19}	Pteancu	August 24, 2015	La Palma	EURONEAR	·	1.4 km	MPC · JPL
769585	2015 QB_{24}	—	August 21, 2015	Haleakala	Pan-STARRS 1	·	1.7 km	MPC · JPL
769586	2015 QU_{27}	—	August 21, 2015	Haleakala	Pan-STARRS 1	·	740 m	MPC · JPL
769587	2015 QS_{30}	—	August 20, 2015	Kitt Peak	Spacewatch	·	1.1 km	MPC · JPL
769588	2015 QJ_{31}	—	August 20, 2015	Kitt Peak	Spacewatch	·	1.2 km	MPC · JPL
769589	2015 QN_{42}	—	August 21, 2015	Haleakala	Pan-STARRS 1	·	1.1 km	MPC · JPL
769590	2015 QJ_{43}	—	September 4, 2011	Haleakala	Pan-STARRS 1	·	1.2 km	MPC · JPL
769591	2015 RW	—	July 23, 2015	Haleakala	Pan-STARRS 1	KON	1.5 km	MPC · JPL
769592	2015 RB_{4}	—	June 20, 2015	Haleakala	Pan-STARRS 1	·	1.0 km	MPC · JPL
769593	2015 RB_{6}	—	July 18, 2015	Haleakala	Pan-STARRS 1	·	1.3 km	MPC · JPL
769594	2015 RE_{11}	—	February 20, 2014	Mount Lemmon	Mount Lemmon Survey	MAS	610 m	MPC · JPL
769595	2015 RX_{13}	—	September 24, 2011	Haleakala	Pan-STARRS 1	·	1.2 km	MPC · JPL
769596	2015 RB_{19}	—	December 18, 2007	Mount Lemmon	Mount Lemmon Survey	(5)	1.1 km	MPC · JPL
769597	2015 RM_{21}	—	September 6, 2015	Haleakala	Pan-STARRS 1	·	1.0 km	MPC · JPL
769598	2015 RQ_{23}	—	August 10, 2010	Kitt Peak	Spacewatch	·	1.6 km	MPC · JPL
769599	2015 RR_{31}	—	October 5, 2011	La Sagra	OAM	·	940 m	MPC · JPL
769600	2015 RH_{32}	—	September 9, 2015	Haleakala	Pan-STARRS 1	·	1.5 km	MPC · JPL

== 769601–769700 ==
back to top

Designation			Discovery			Properties		Ref
Permanent	Provisional	Named after	Date	Site	Discoverer(s)	Category	Diam.	Ref
769601	2015 RB_{34}	—	January 7, 2003	La Silla	La Silla	·	1.2 km	MPC · JPL
769602	2015 RU_{35}	—	December 29, 2003	Anderson Mesa	LONEOS	BAR	1.2 km	MPC · JPL
769603	2015 RU_{37}	—	September 9, 2015	XuYi	PMO NEO Survey Program	·	1.1 km	MPC · JPL
769604	2015 RH_{39}	—	February 8, 2013	Haleakala	Pan-STARRS 1	·	1.2 km	MPC · JPL
769605	2015 RE_{43}	—	July 23, 2015	Haleakala	Pan-STARRS 1	·	1.2 km	MPC · JPL
769606	2015 RH_{46}	—	April 1, 2014	Mount Lemmon	Mount Lemmon Survey	BRG	1.0 km	MPC · JPL
769607	2015 RC_{48}	—	May 3, 2006	Mount Lemmon	Mount Lemmon Survey	·	980 m	MPC · JPL
769608	2015 RX_{48}	—	July 23, 2015	Haleakala	Pan-STARRS 1	·	1.1 km	MPC · JPL
769609	2015 RJ_{52}	—	April 29, 2014	Haleakala	Pan-STARRS 1	·	950 m	MPC · JPL
769610	2015 RO_{52}	—	September 6, 2015	Kitt Peak	Spacewatch	·	1.6 km	MPC · JPL
769611	2015 RZ_{59}	—	November 4, 2010	Mount Lemmon	Mount Lemmon Survey	·	2.0 km	MPC · JPL
769612	2015 RC_{61}	—	May 2, 2014	Mount Lemmon	Mount Lemmon Survey	·	970 m	MPC · JPL
769613	2015 RE_{62}	—	May 23, 2014	Haleakala	Pan-STARRS 1	·	1.3 km	MPC · JPL
769614	2015 RF_{63}	—	May 23, 2014	Haleakala	Pan-STARRS 1	·	1.4 km	MPC · JPL
769615	2015 RU_{64}	—	October 16, 2007	Mount Lemmon	Mount Lemmon Survey	·	900 m	MPC · JPL
769616	2015 RR_{71}	—	September 13, 2007	Mount Lemmon	Mount Lemmon Survey	3:2	3.7 km	MPC · JPL
769617	2015 RZ_{74}	—	February 26, 2014	Haleakala	Pan-STARRS 1	JUN	790 m	MPC · JPL
769618	2015 RZ_{75}	—	February 27, 2014	Haleakala	Pan-STARRS 1	·	760 m	MPC · JPL
769619	2015 RD_{76}	—	September 10, 2015	Haleakala	Pan-STARRS 1	(5)	900 m	MPC · JPL
769620	2015 RO_{79}	—	September 18, 2006	Kitt Peak	Spacewatch	·	1.3 km	MPC · JPL
769621	2015 RH_{94}	—	October 30, 2011	ESA OGS	ESA OGS	·	910 m	MPC · JPL
769622	2015 RM_{96}	—	September 24, 2011	Haleakala	Pan-STARRS 1	·	1.2 km	MPC · JPL
769623	2015 RW_{102}	—	August 30, 2011	Nizhny Arkhyz	V. Gerke, A. Novichonok	·	1.2 km	MPC · JPL
769624	2015 RO_{112}	—	January 17, 2009	Kitt Peak	Spacewatch	·	1.0 km	MPC · JPL
769625	2015 RU_{116}	—	September 13, 2015	Atom Site	Space Surveillance Telescope	·	1.2 km	MPC · JPL
769626	2015 RE_{127}	—	August 12, 2010	Kitt Peak	Spacewatch	KOR	1.1 km	MPC · JPL
769627	2015 RD_{128}	—	February 9, 2013	Haleakala	Pan-STARRS 1	·	1.1 km	MPC · JPL
769628	2015 RO_{129}	—	September 9, 2015	Haleakala	Pan-STARRS 1	3:2	3.4 km	MPC · JPL
769629	2015 RN_{136}	—	September 9, 2015	Haleakala	Pan-STARRS 1	3:2	3.5 km	MPC · JPL
769630	2015 RZ_{139}	—	August 10, 2015	Haleakala	Pan-STARRS 2	EUN	830 m	MPC · JPL
769631	2015 RT_{144}	—	February 7, 2013	Kitt Peak	Spacewatch	EUN	900 m	MPC · JPL
769632	2015 RY_{152}	—	November 9, 2007	Kitt Peak	Spacewatch	·	1.1 km	MPC · JPL
769633	2015 RF_{153}	—	April 5, 2014	Haleakala	Pan-STARRS 1	·	1.2 km	MPC · JPL
769634	2015 RO_{163}	—	September 29, 2011	Mount Lemmon	Mount Lemmon Survey	·	740 m	MPC · JPL
769635	2015 RM_{172}	—	May 8, 2014	Haleakala	Pan-STARRS 1	·	830 m	MPC · JPL
769636	2015 RU_{177}	—	October 17, 2011	Kitt Peak	Spacewatch	·	1.2 km	MPC · JPL
769637	2015 RK_{180}	—	October 14, 2010	Mount Lemmon	Mount Lemmon Survey	EOS	1.3 km	MPC · JPL
769638	2015 RL_{184}	—	October 22, 2011	Mount Lemmon	Mount Lemmon Survey	·	940 m	MPC · JPL
769639	2015 RM_{184}	—	September 23, 2011	Kitt Peak	Spacewatch	·	870 m	MPC · JPL
769640	2015 RX_{185}	—	September 9, 2015	Haleakala	Pan-STARRS 1	·	1.3 km	MPC · JPL
769641	2015 RF_{186}	—	September 9, 2015	Haleakala	Pan-STARRS 1	HOF	1.8 km	MPC · JPL
769642	2015 RN_{186}	—	August 31, 2011	Haleakala	Pan-STARRS 1	·	1.1 km	MPC · JPL
769643	2015 RQ_{186}	—	September 29, 2011	Mount Lemmon	Mount Lemmon Survey	·	830 m	MPC · JPL
769644	2015 RA_{187}	—	July 12, 2015	Haleakala	Pan-STARRS 1	MAR	690 m	MPC · JPL
769645	2015 RW_{187}	—	September 10, 2015	Haleakala	Pan-STARRS 1	·	950 m	MPC · JPL
769646	2015 RD_{189}	—	September 10, 2015	Haleakala	Pan-STARRS 1	·	1.5 km	MPC · JPL
769647	2015 RK_{190}	—	June 27, 2014	Haleakala	Pan-STARRS 1	HNS	850 m	MPC · JPL
769648	2015 RZ_{193}	—	February 17, 2013	Kitt Peak	Spacewatch	HNS	910 m	MPC · JPL
769649	2015 RL_{195}	—	November 7, 2007	Mount Lemmon	Mount Lemmon Survey	·	840 m	MPC · JPL
769650	2015 RG_{205}	—	August 12, 2015	Haleakala	Pan-STARRS 1	·	1.2 km	MPC · JPL
769651	2015 RV_{205}	—	March 29, 2014	Mount Lemmon	Mount Lemmon Survey	·	1.0 km	MPC · JPL
769652	2015 RS_{211}	—	July 18, 2015	Haleakala	Pan-STARRS 1	·	860 m	MPC · JPL
769653	2015 RA_{216}	—	March 1, 2009	Mount Lemmon	Mount Lemmon Survey	MAR	640 m	MPC · JPL
769654	2015 RH_{219}	—	November 1, 2011	Mount Lemmon	Mount Lemmon Survey	KON	1.6 km	MPC · JPL
769655	2015 RR_{219}	—	October 18, 2011	Mount Lemmon	Mount Lemmon Survey	·	980 m	MPC · JPL
769656	2015 RM_{222}	—	September 11, 2015	Haleakala	Pan-STARRS 1	·	1.3 km	MPC · JPL
769657	2015 RP_{223}	—	January 1, 2008	Kitt Peak	Spacewatch	·	1.3 km	MPC · JPL
769658	2015 RV_{223}	—	September 11, 2015	Haleakala	Pan-STARRS 1	·	1.3 km	MPC · JPL
769659	2015 RN_{229}	—	October 26, 2011	Haleakala	Pan-STARRS 1	·	1.0 km	MPC · JPL
769660	2015 RS_{230}	—	September 15, 2006	Kitt Peak	Spacewatch	·	1.4 km	MPC · JPL
769661	2015 RU_{230}	—	October 24, 2011	Mount Lemmon	Mount Lemmon Survey	·	1.1 km	MPC · JPL
769662	2015 RJ_{237}	—	September 11, 2015	Haleakala	Pan-STARRS 1	·	1.2 km	MPC · JPL
769663	2015 RL_{237}	—	October 21, 2007	Mount Lemmon	Mount Lemmon Survey	3:2	4.1 km	MPC · JPL
769664	2015 RA_{239}	—	February 26, 2008	Mount Lemmon	Mount Lemmon Survey	·	1.0 km	MPC · JPL
769665	2015 RF_{239}	—	May 24, 2014	Mount Lemmon	Mount Lemmon Survey	·	1.4 km	MPC · JPL
769666	2015 RE_{240}	—	December 30, 2011	Kitt Peak	Spacewatch	EUN	930 m	MPC · JPL
769667	2015 RF_{241}	—	September 11, 2015	Haleakala	Pan-STARRS 1	·	1.3 km	MPC · JPL
769668	2015 RP_{248}	—	September 9, 2015	Haleakala	Pan-STARRS 1	·	1.1 km	MPC · JPL
769669	2015 RE_{251}	—	August 18, 2006	Kitt Peak	Spacewatch	·	1.1 km	MPC · JPL
769670	2015 RG_{254}	—	March 22, 2009	Mount Lemmon	Mount Lemmon Survey	·	1.3 km	MPC · JPL
769671	2015 RU_{254}	—	September 9, 2015	Haleakala	Pan-STARRS 1	·	1.4 km	MPC · JPL
769672	2015 RO_{255}	—	March 6, 2013	Haleakala	Pan-STARRS 1	·	1.4 km	MPC · JPL
769673	2015 RN_{257}	—	December 17, 2007	Mount Lemmon	Mount Lemmon Survey	·	1.1 km	MPC · JPL
769674	2015 RS_{257}	—	September 10, 2015	Haleakala	Pan-STARRS 1	·	1.3 km	MPC · JPL
769675	2015 RO_{258}	—	March 3, 2009	Mount Lemmon	Mount Lemmon Survey	·	1.1 km	MPC · JPL
769676	2015 RK_{259}	—	September 10, 2015	Haleakala	Pan-STARRS 1	·	1.3 km	MPC · JPL
769677	2015 RP_{261}	—	September 12, 2015	Haleakala	Pan-STARRS 1	·	700 m	MPC · JPL
769678	2015 RF_{262}	—	November 24, 2011	Mount Lemmon	Mount Lemmon Survey	AGN	880 m	MPC · JPL
769679	2015 RV_{264}	—	March 15, 2013	Kitt Peak	Spacewatch	·	1.2 km	MPC · JPL
769680	2015 RY_{264}	—	September 9, 2015	Haleakala	Pan-STARRS 1	·	1.2 km	MPC · JPL
769681	2015 RK_{265}	—	April 18, 2009	Mount Lemmon	Mount Lemmon Survey	·	1.4 km	MPC · JPL
769682	2015 RD_{266}	—	May 21, 2014	Haleakala	Pan-STARRS 1	·	1.1 km	MPC · JPL
769683	2015 RT_{266}	—	November 30, 2011	Mount Lemmon	Mount Lemmon Survey	EUN	1.0 km	MPC · JPL
769684	2015 RX_{267}	—	June 27, 2014	Haleakala	Pan-STARRS 1	EOS	1.6 km	MPC · JPL
769685	2015 RS_{268}	—	October 22, 2006	Kitt Peak	Spacewatch	·	1.4 km	MPC · JPL
769686	2015 RW_{268}	—	October 23, 2011	Haleakala	Pan-STARRS 1	·	1.1 km	MPC · JPL
769687	2015 RZ_{268}	—	October 22, 2006	Kitt Peak	Spacewatch	·	1.7 km	MPC · JPL
769688	2015 RD_{269}	—	October 1, 2011	Kitt Peak	Spacewatch	·	990 m	MPC · JPL
769689	2015 RM_{269}	—	February 14, 2013	Kitt Peak	Spacewatch	(5)	810 m	MPC · JPL
769690	2015 RP_{269}	—	September 10, 2015	Haleakala	Pan-STARRS 1	·	1.1 km	MPC · JPL
769691	2015 RT_{270}	—	May 8, 2014	Haleakala	Pan-STARRS 1	·	990 m	MPC · JPL
769692	2015 RF_{272}	—	March 8, 2008	Mount Lemmon	Mount Lemmon Survey	·	1.6 km	MPC · JPL
769693	2015 RZ_{272}	—	September 11, 2015	Haleakala	Pan-STARRS 1	HNS	870 m	MPC · JPL
769694	2015 RB_{274}	—	May 23, 2014	Haleakala	Pan-STARRS 1	·	1.5 km	MPC · JPL
769695	2015 RM_{274}	—	May 4, 2014	Mount Lemmon	Mount Lemmon Survey	·	970 m	MPC · JPL
769696	2015 RX_{274}	—	January 1, 2012	Mount Lemmon	Mount Lemmon Survey	·	1.4 km	MPC · JPL
769697	2015 RF_{275}	—	October 26, 2011	Haleakala	Pan-STARRS 1	·	950 m	MPC · JPL
769698	2015 RH_{275}	—	May 21, 2014	Haleakala	Pan-STARRS 1	·	1.1 km	MPC · JPL
769699	2015 RM_{275}	—	May 6, 2014	Haleakala	Pan-STARRS 1	·	1.0 km	MPC · JPL
769700	2015 RR_{275}	—	September 12, 2015	Haleakala	Pan-STARRS 1	MAR	610 m	MPC · JPL

== 769701–769800 ==
back to top

Designation			Discovery			Properties		Ref
Permanent	Provisional	Named after	Date	Site	Discoverer(s)	Category	Diam.	Ref
769701	2015 RW_{275}	—	September 12, 2015	Haleakala	Pan-STARRS 1	KOR	1.1 km	MPC · JPL
769702	2015 RX_{275}	—	March 19, 2013	Haleakala	Pan-STARRS 1	KOR	970 m	MPC · JPL
769703	2015 RG_{276}	—	September 22, 2011	Mount Lemmon	Mount Lemmon Survey	MAR	740 m	MPC · JPL
769704	2015 RL_{276}	—	April 2, 2009	Kitt Peak	Spacewatch	·	1.2 km	MPC · JPL
769705	2015 RY_{276}	—	May 23, 2014	Haleakala	Pan-STARRS 1	·	1.1 km	MPC · JPL
769706	2015 RO_{282}	—	September 9, 2015	Haleakala	Pan-STARRS 1	HNS	820 m	MPC · JPL
769707	2015 RY_{289}	—	September 9, 2015	Haleakala	Pan-STARRS 1	·	1.3 km	MPC · JPL
769708	2015 RN_{290}	—	September 9, 2015	XuYi	PMO NEO Survey Program	·	1.5 km	MPC · JPL
769709	2015 RR_{292}	—	September 10, 2015	Haleakala	Pan-STARRS 1	EUN	790 m	MPC · JPL
769710	2015 RR_{302}	—	October 2, 2003	Kitt Peak	Spacewatch	(5)	810 m	MPC · JPL
769711	2015 RS_{303}	—	September 9, 2015	Haleakala	Pan-STARRS 1	NEM	1.7 km	MPC · JPL
769712	2015 RW_{303}	—	September 11, 2015	Haleakala	Pan-STARRS 1	·	1.2 km	MPC · JPL
769713	2015 RH_{304}	—	September 12, 2015	Haleakala	Pan-STARRS 1	·	1.1 km	MPC · JPL
769714	2015 RX_{309}	—	September 12, 2015	Haleakala	Pan-STARRS 1	AGN	890 m	MPC · JPL
769715	2015 RR_{324}	—	September 11, 2015	Haleakala	Pan-STARRS 1	·	810 m	MPC · JPL
769716	2015 RG_{327}	—	September 11, 2015	Haleakala	Pan-STARRS 1	HOF	1.8 km	MPC · JPL
769717	2015 RF_{329}	—	September 11, 2007	Mount Lemmon	Mount Lemmon Survey	3:2	3.7 km	MPC · JPL
769718	2015 RP_{334}	—	September 9, 2015	Haleakala	Pan-STARRS 1	·	970 m	MPC · JPL
769719	2015 RP_{340}	—	August 12, 2010	Kitt Peak	Spacewatch	·	1.5 km	MPC · JPL
769720	2015 RV_{343}	—	September 11, 2015	Haleakala	Pan-STARRS 1	·	860 m	MPC · JPL
769721	2015 RV_{359}	—	September 9, 2015	Haleakala	Pan-STARRS 1	·	2.1 km	MPC · JPL
769722	2015 RF_{360}	—	September 24, 2011	Mount Lemmon	Mount Lemmon Survey	·	1.1 km	MPC · JPL
769723	2015 RU_{373}	—	September 11, 2015	Haleakala	Pan-STARRS 1	HOF	1.9 km	MPC · JPL
769724	2015 SB_{2}	—	September 23, 2011	Kitt Peak	Spacewatch	·	1.1 km	MPC · JPL
769725	2015 SS_{3}	—	November 2, 2011	Catalina	CSS	·	1.0 km	MPC · JPL
769726	2015 SZ_{5}	—	July 25, 2015	Haleakala	Pan-STARRS 1	MAR	840 m	MPC · JPL
769727	2015 SG_{18}	—	July 27, 2011	Haleakala	Pan-STARRS 1	·	1.1 km	MPC · JPL
769728	2015 SM_{19}	—	March 26, 2014	Mount Lemmon	Mount Lemmon Survey	·	1.3 km	MPC · JPL
769729	2015 SU_{22}	—	January 13, 2008	Kitt Peak	Spacewatch	·	1.3 km	MPC · JPL
769730	2015 SX_{22}	—	September 23, 2015	Haleakala	Pan-STARRS 1	EUN	930 m	MPC · JPL
769731	2015 SW_{25}	—	October 22, 2011	Kitt Peak	Spacewatch	·	960 m	MPC · JPL
769732	2015 SJ_{26}	—	September 19, 2015	Haleakala	Pan-STARRS 1	EUN	900 m	MPC · JPL
769733	2015 SW_{26}	—	March 19, 2013	Haleakala	Pan-STARRS 1	EUN	970 m	MPC · JPL
769734	2015 SK_{27}	—	July 1, 2014	Haleakala	Pan-STARRS 1	T_{j} (2.95)	3.5 km	MPC · JPL
769735	2015 SA_{28}	—	September 23, 2015	Haleakala	Pan-STARRS 1	·	1.2 km	MPC · JPL
769736	2015 SK_{28}	—	September 23, 2015	Haleakala	Pan-STARRS 1	·	1.2 km	MPC · JPL
769737	2015 SX_{28}	—	July 30, 2014	Haleakala	Pan-STARRS 1	·	2.1 km	MPC · JPL
769738	2015 SP_{31}	—	February 9, 2008	Mount Lemmon	Mount Lemmon Survey	·	1.2 km	MPC · JPL
769739	2015 SF_{39}	—	September 23, 2015	Haleakala	Pan-STARRS 1	·	890 m	MPC · JPL
769740	2015 SA_{46}	—	September 23, 2015	Haleakala	Pan-STARRS 1	·	1.4 km	MPC · JPL
769741	2015 SU_{47}	—	September 23, 2015	Haleakala	Pan-STARRS 1	ADE	1.4 km	MPC · JPL
769742	2015 SC_{51}	—	September 23, 2015	Haleakala	Pan-STARRS 1	EOS	1.4 km	MPC · JPL
769743	2015 SL_{52}	—	September 18, 2015	Mount Lemmon	Mount Lemmon Survey	·	3.3 km	MPC · JPL
769744	2015 SP_{54}	—	September 23, 2015	Haleakala	Pan-STARRS 1	·	1.3 km	MPC · JPL
769745	2015 TE_{4}	—	September 11, 2010	Kitt Peak	Spacewatch	·	1.7 km	MPC · JPL
769746	2015 TY_{5}	—	October 2, 2015	Haleakala	Pan-STARRS 1	TIR	2.3 km	MPC · JPL
769747	2015 TS_{9}	—	October 31, 2011	Kitt Peak	Spacewatch	·	1.3 km	MPC · JPL
769748	2015 TO_{13}	—	October 19, 2011	Haleakala	Pan-STARRS 1	·	1.1 km	MPC · JPL
769749	2015 TQ_{17}	—	October 18, 2011	Haleakala	Pan-STARRS 1	EUN	950 m	MPC · JPL
769750	2015 TS_{17}	—	November 5, 2011	Haleakala	Pan-STARRS 1	EUN	970 m	MPC · JPL
769751	2015 TO_{25}	—	September 10, 2015	Haleakala	Pan-STARRS 1	·	880 m	MPC · JPL
769752	2015 TW_{29}	—	November 1, 2007	Kitt Peak	Spacewatch	·	1.1 km	MPC · JPL
769753	2015 TB_{30}	—	November 17, 2011	Kitt Peak	Spacewatch	NAE	1.9 km	MPC · JPL
769754	2015 TA_{31}	—	July 23, 2015	Haleakala	Pan-STARRS 1	·	980 m	MPC · JPL
769755	2015 TD_{33}	—	November 20, 2007	Kitt Peak	Spacewatch	·	860 m	MPC · JPL
769756	2015 TC_{34}	—	October 5, 2015	Haleakala	Pan-STARRS 1	·	870 m	MPC · JPL
769757	2015 TX_{36}	—	October 5, 2015	Haleakala	Pan-STARRS 1	HNS	820 m	MPC · JPL
769758	2015 TP_{37}	—	February 14, 2013	Haleakala	Pan-STARRS 1	EUN	760 m	MPC · JPL
769759	2015 TY_{37}	—	July 19, 2015	Haleakala	Pan-STARRS 1	EUN	930 m	MPC · JPL
769760	2015 TN_{38}	—	May 23, 2014	Haleakala	Pan-STARRS 1	·	1.1 km	MPC · JPL
769761	2015 TA_{43}	—	May 24, 2014	Haleakala	Pan-STARRS 1	·	1.1 km	MPC · JPL
769762	2015 TG_{44}	—	October 11, 2004	Kitt Peak	Deep Ecliptic Survey	·	2.2 km	MPC · JPL
769763	2015 TW_{44}	—	April 10, 2014	Haleakala	Pan-STARRS 1	·	1.4 km	MPC · JPL
769764	2015 TR_{46}	—	April 29, 2014	Haleakala	Pan-STARRS 1	·	710 m	MPC · JPL
769765	2015 TN_{49}	—	October 24, 2011	Haleakala	Pan-STARRS 1	·	1.1 km	MPC · JPL
769766	2015 TU_{49}	—	October 22, 2011	Mount Lemmon	Mount Lemmon Survey	·	1.2 km	MPC · JPL
769767	2015 TG_{50}	—	March 13, 2013	Haleakala	Pan-STARRS 1	·	2.0 km	MPC · JPL
769768	2015 TT_{51}	—	October 23, 2011	Haleakala	Pan-STARRS 1	·	1.1 km	MPC · JPL
769769	2015 TY_{55}	—	July 23, 2015	Haleakala	Pan-STARRS 1	·	1.2 km	MPC · JPL
769770	2015 TV_{59}	—	December 19, 2009	Mount Lemmon	Mount Lemmon Survey	·	490 m	MPC · JPL
769771	2015 TB_{61}	—	April 30, 2014	Haleakala	Pan-STARRS 1	·	1.2 km	MPC · JPL
769772	2015 TL_{66}	—	March 25, 2012	Mount Lemmon	Mount Lemmon Survey	·	2.3 km	MPC · JPL
769773	2015 TN_{67}	—	May 6, 2014	Haleakala	Pan-STARRS 1	·	940 m	MPC · JPL
769774	2015 TQ_{67}	—	September 5, 2010	Mount Lemmon	Mount Lemmon Survey	·	1.4 km	MPC · JPL
769775	2015 TB_{68}	—	December 30, 2007	Mount Lemmon	Mount Lemmon Survey	·	1.1 km	MPC · JPL
769776	2015 TC_{73}	—	September 9, 2015	Haleakala	Pan-STARRS 1	·	1.3 km	MPC · JPL
769777	2015 TE_{77}	—	October 21, 2011	Mount Lemmon	Mount Lemmon Survey	KON	1.8 km	MPC · JPL
769778	2015 TP_{80}	—	November 4, 2004	Catalina	CSS	·	2.4 km	MPC · JPL
769779	2015 TY_{80}	—	March 7, 2013	Kitt Peak	Spacewatch	·	870 m	MPC · JPL
769780	2015 TL_{81}	—	August 14, 2006	Siding Spring	SSS	·	1.2 km	MPC · JPL
769781	2015 TQ_{82}	—	October 25, 2011	Haleakala	Pan-STARRS 1	·	1.0 km	MPC · JPL
769782	2015 TH_{83}	—	November 11, 2006	Mount Lemmon	Mount Lemmon Survey	·	1.4 km	MPC · JPL
769783	2015 TJ_{83}	—	October 8, 2015	Haleakala	Pan-STARRS 1	·	1.9 km	MPC · JPL
769784	2015 TT_{83}	—	August 19, 2006	Kitt Peak	Spacewatch	·	1.2 km	MPC · JPL
769785	2015 TX_{84}	—	October 8, 2015	Haleakala	Pan-STARRS 1	·	1.3 km	MPC · JPL
769786	2015 TL_{90}	—	October 2, 2010	Kitt Peak	Spacewatch	·	1.5 km	MPC · JPL
769787	2015 TJ_{92}	—	October 8, 2015	Haleakala	Pan-STARRS 1	·	1.2 km	MPC · JPL
769788	2015 TA_{93}	—	October 8, 2015	Haleakala	Pan-STARRS 1	·	1.1 km	MPC · JPL
769789	2015 TW_{96}	—	October 8, 2015	Haleakala	Pan-STARRS 1	·	960 m	MPC · JPL
769790	2015 TF_{98}	—	September 10, 2010	Mount Lemmon	Mount Lemmon Survey	·	1.5 km	MPC · JPL
769791	2015 TF_{102}	—	October 8, 2015	Haleakala	Pan-STARRS 1	·	1.5 km	MPC · JPL
769792	2015 TP_{102}	—	October 8, 2015	Haleakala	Pan-STARRS 1	·	1.7 km	MPC · JPL
769793	2015 TM_{103}	—	September 24, 2011	Haleakala	Pan-STARRS 1	·	1.2 km	MPC · JPL
769794	2015 TQ_{103}	—	October 8, 2015	Haleakala	Pan-STARRS 1	·	1.5 km	MPC · JPL
769795	2015 TX_{103}	—	January 27, 2011	Mount Lemmon	Mount Lemmon Survey	·	2.4 km	MPC · JPL
769796	2015 TM_{106}	—	October 25, 2001	Apache Point	SDSS	·	540 m	MPC · JPL
769797	2015 TK_{108}	—	April 12, 2013	Siding Spring	SSS	·	2.0 km	MPC · JPL
769798	2015 TE_{109}	—	August 29, 2005	Kitt Peak	Spacewatch	·	1.6 km	MPC · JPL
769799	2015 TP_{110}	—	October 8, 2015	Haleakala	Pan-STARRS 1	HNS	940 m	MPC · JPL
769800	2015 TD_{111}	—	January 2, 2012	Mount Lemmon	Mount Lemmon Survey	·	1.2 km	MPC · JPL

== 769801–769900 ==
back to top

Designation			Discovery			Properties		Ref
Permanent	Provisional	Named after	Date	Site	Discoverer(s)	Category	Diam.	Ref
769801	2015 TT_{113}	—	October 8, 2015	Haleakala	Pan-STARRS 1	·	1.1 km	MPC · JPL
769802	2015 TY_{113}	—	October 8, 2015	Haleakala	Pan-STARRS 1	·	1.1 km	MPC · JPL
769803	2015 TC_{120}	—	October 8, 2015	Haleakala	Pan-STARRS 1	·	840 m	MPC · JPL
769804	2015 TJ_{122}	—	January 30, 2008	Mount Lemmon	Mount Lemmon Survey	·	880 m	MPC · JPL
769805	2015 TS_{124}	—	October 8, 2015	Haleakala	Pan-STARRS 1	·	1.3 km	MPC · JPL
769806	2015 TK_{129}	—	October 8, 2015	Haleakala	Pan-STARRS 1	·	1.2 km	MPC · JPL
769807	2015 TA_{132}	—	May 15, 2009	Kitt Peak	Spacewatch	·	1.3 km	MPC · JPL
769808	2015 TY_{133}	—	April 19, 2013	Haleakala	Pan-STARRS 1	EOS	1.6 km	MPC · JPL
769809	2015 TP_{135}	—	February 26, 2008	Mount Lemmon	Mount Lemmon Survey	·	1.4 km	MPC · JPL
769810	2015 TQ_{139}	—	October 8, 2015	Haleakala	Pan-STARRS 1	·	1.4 km	MPC · JPL
769811	2015 TU_{140}	—	April 30, 2014	Haleakala	Pan-STARRS 1	·	1.6 km	MPC · JPL
769812	2015 TY_{145}	—	October 26, 2011	Haleakala	Pan-STARRS 1	·	1.2 km	MPC · JPL
769813	2015 TC_{152}	—	September 26, 2011	Kitt Peak	Spacewatch	EUN	790 m	MPC · JPL
769814	2015 TY_{153}	—	August 27, 2011	Dauban	C. Rinner, Kugel, F.	NYS	1.0 km	MPC · JPL
769815	2015 TE_{154}	—	October 26, 2011	Haleakala	Pan-STARRS 1	·	1.1 km	MPC · JPL
769816	2015 TN_{160}	—	September 10, 2015	Haleakala	Pan-STARRS 1	·	2.2 km	MPC · JPL
769817	2015 TJ_{161}	—	November 24, 2011	Haleakala	Pan-STARRS 1	HNS	820 m	MPC · JPL
769818	2015 TX_{162}	—	February 3, 2013	Haleakala	Pan-STARRS 1	·	800 m	MPC · JPL
769819	2015 TR_{171}	—	October 9, 2015	Haleakala	Pan-STARRS 1	·	1.4 km	MPC · JPL
769820	2015 TW_{174}	—	October 26, 2011	Haleakala	Pan-STARRS 1	·	950 m	MPC · JPL
769821	2015 TO_{176}	—	April 9, 2013	Haleakala	Pan-STARRS 1	HNS	790 m	MPC · JPL
769822	2015 TX_{185}	—	April 15, 2013	Haleakala	Pan-STARRS 1	·	1.4 km	MPC · JPL
769823	2015 TX_{187}	—	October 23, 2011	Haleakala	Pan-STARRS 1	·	980 m	MPC · JPL
769824	2015 TS_{190}	—	October 10, 2015	Catalina	CSS	EUN	820 m	MPC · JPL
769825	2015 TC_{195}	—	October 23, 2011	Haleakala	Pan-STARRS 1	EUN	820 m	MPC · JPL
769826	2015 TZ_{196}	—	November 20, 2007	Mount Lemmon	Mount Lemmon Survey	KON	1.7 km	MPC · JPL
769827	2015 TD_{199}	—	September 12, 2015	Haleakala	Pan-STARRS 1	·	1.1 km	MPC · JPL
769828	2015 TV_{199}	—	September 18, 1998	Kitt Peak	Spacewatch	·	1.1 km	MPC · JPL
769829	2015 TG_{200}	—	December 31, 2007	Kitt Peak	Spacewatch	·	880 m	MPC · JPL
769830	2015 TK_{210}	—	August 21, 2006	Kitt Peak	Spacewatch	·	1.0 km	MPC · JPL
769831	2015 TD_{211}	—	October 24, 2005	Mauna Kea	A. Boattini	NYS	590 m	MPC · JPL
769832	2015 TH_{211}	—	May 21, 2014	Haleakala	Pan-STARRS 1	AGN	910 m	MPC · JPL
769833	2015 TZ_{211}	—	October 22, 2011	Kitt Peak	Spacewatch	·	1.2 km	MPC · JPL
769834	2015 TD_{214}	—	September 10, 2004	Kitt Peak	Spacewatch	LIX	2.5 km	MPC · JPL
769835	2015 TV_{214}	—	October 21, 2011	Kitt Peak	Spacewatch	(5)	1.0 km	MPC · JPL
769836	2015 TZ_{214}	—	November 8, 2007	Kitt Peak	Spacewatch	(5)	830 m	MPC · JPL
769837	2015 TX_{216}	—	November 17, 2011	Kitt Peak	Spacewatch	·	1.1 km	MPC · JPL
769838	2015 TD_{218}	—	February 26, 2014	Haleakala	Pan-STARRS 1	JUN	770 m	MPC · JPL
769839	2015 TP_{222}	—	December 19, 2007	Mount Lemmon	Mount Lemmon Survey	·	1.1 km	MPC · JPL
769840	2015 TC_{223}	—	November 1, 2011	Kitt Peak	Spacewatch	·	1.1 km	MPC · JPL
769841	2015 TN_{224}	—	April 16, 2013	Cerro Tololo-DECam	DECam	·	1.3 km	MPC · JPL
769842	2015 TW_{226}	—	October 10, 2015	Haleakala	Pan-STARRS 1	EUN	710 m	MPC · JPL
769843	2015 TX_{226}	—	October 10, 2015	Haleakala	Pan-STARRS 1	·	990 m	MPC · JPL
769844	2015 TF_{227}	—	October 10, 2015	Haleakala	Pan-STARRS 1	·	1.4 km	MPC · JPL
769845	2015 TK_{227}	—	October 10, 2015	Haleakala	Pan-STARRS 1	·	1.7 km	MPC · JPL
769846	2015 TS_{227}	—	October 23, 2011	Haleakala	Pan-STARRS 1	·	1.6 km	MPC · JPL
769847	2015 TW_{229}	—	October 10, 2015	Haleakala	Pan-STARRS 1	HNS	820 m	MPC · JPL
769848	2015 TU_{230}	—	September 30, 2006	Mount Lemmon	Mount Lemmon Survey	·	1.2 km	MPC · JPL
769849	2015 TJ_{232}	—	July 30, 2014	Kitt Peak	Spacewatch	·	2.2 km	MPC · JPL
769850	2015 TC_{234}	—	July 25, 2015	Haleakala	Pan-STARRS 1	(1547)	1.0 km	MPC · JPL
769851	2015 TF_{235}	—	June 24, 2014	Haleakala	Pan-STARRS 1	·	1.2 km	MPC · JPL
769852	2015 TT_{235}	—	October 11, 2015	Mount Lemmon	Mount Lemmon Survey	·	1.4 km	MPC · JPL
769853	2015 TG_{236}	—	July 25, 2015	Haleakala	Pan-STARRS 1	EUN	590 m	MPC · JPL
769854	2015 TO_{240}	—	January 10, 2008	Mount Lemmon	Mount Lemmon Survey	·	1.3 km	MPC · JPL
769855	2015 TQ_{241}	—	September 12, 2007	Mount Lemmon	Mount Lemmon Survey	3:2	4.1 km	MPC · JPL
769856	2015 TT_{241}	—	October 25, 2011	Haleakala	Pan-STARRS 1	·	1.0 km	MPC · JPL
769857	2015 TL_{243}	—	September 15, 2004	Kitt Peak	Spacewatch	·	1.6 km	MPC · JPL
769858	2015 TC_{247}	—	July 23, 2015	Haleakala	Pan-STARRS 1	3:2	4.1 km	MPC · JPL
769859	2015 TT_{249}	—	December 20, 2007	Kitt Peak	Spacewatch	·	1.3 km	MPC · JPL
769860	2015 TO_{253}	—	October 2, 2006	Mount Lemmon	Mount Lemmon Survey	·	1.3 km	MPC · JPL
769861	2015 TP_{253}	—	October 10, 2015	Haleakala	Pan-STARRS 1	·	1.3 km	MPC · JPL
769862	2015 TT_{257}	—	October 24, 2011	Catalina	CSS	EUN	940 m	MPC · JPL
769863	2015 TE_{260}	—	July 25, 2015	Haleakala	Pan-STARRS 1	·	1.2 km	MPC · JPL
769864	2015 TP_{260}	—	January 2, 2012	Mount Lemmon	Mount Lemmon Survey	·	1.6 km	MPC · JPL
769865	2015 TE_{263}	—	February 26, 2014	Haleakala	Pan-STARRS 1	·	1.2 km	MPC · JPL
769866	2015 TM_{264}	—	February 15, 2013	Haleakala	Pan-STARRS 1	·	1.5 km	MPC · JPL
769867	2015 TN_{264}	—	October 24, 2011	Haleakala	Pan-STARRS 1	·	1.3 km	MPC · JPL
769868	2015 TM_{265}	—	December 1, 2011	Haleakala	Pan-STARRS 1	EUN	760 m	MPC · JPL
769869	2015 TX_{266}	—	November 2, 2010	Mount Lemmon	Mount Lemmon Survey	·	1.5 km	MPC · JPL
769870	2015 TV_{269}	—	December 29, 2011	Mount Lemmon	Mount Lemmon Survey	·	1.5 km	MPC · JPL
769871	2015 TQ_{271}	—	October 12, 2007	Kitt Peak	Spacewatch	MAR	630 m	MPC · JPL
769872	2015 TP_{276}	—	October 2, 2015	Mount Lemmon	Mount Lemmon Survey	·	1.3 km	MPC · JPL
769873	2015 TQ_{276}	—	September 18, 2006	Kitt Peak	Spacewatch	·	1.3 km	MPC · JPL
769874	2015 TO_{277}	—	November 25, 2011	Haleakala	Pan-STARRS 1	·	1.1 km	MPC · JPL
769875	2015 TQ_{279}	—	September 12, 2015	Haleakala	Pan-STARRS 1	·	960 m	MPC · JPL
769876	2015 TN_{280}	—	February 9, 2005	Kitt Peak	Spacewatch	EUN	910 m	MPC · JPL
769877	2015 TM_{283}	—	August 12, 2015	Haleakala	Pan-STARRS 1	MAR	630 m	MPC · JPL
769878	2015 TH_{289}	—	September 6, 2015	Haleakala	Pan-STARRS 1	·	1.2 km	MPC · JPL
769879	2015 TE_{293}	—	October 24, 2011	Haleakala	Pan-STARRS 1	·	1.3 km	MPC · JPL
769880	2015 TC_{304}	—	October 10, 2007	Catalina	CSS	T_{j} (2.93)	3.5 km	MPC · JPL
769881	2015 TM_{304}	—	November 3, 2011	Mayhill-ISON	L. Elenin	·	900 m	MPC · JPL
769882	2015 TN_{304}	—	October 12, 2015	Haleakala	Pan-STARRS 1	KON	1.5 km	MPC · JPL
769883	2015 TA_{307}	—	October 10, 2015	Haleakala	Pan-STARRS 1	·	1.5 km	MPC · JPL
769884	2015 TK_{307}	—	October 12, 2015	Haleakala	Pan-STARRS 1	·	1.4 km	MPC · JPL
769885	2015 TU_{308}	—	September 8, 2015	Haleakala	Pan-STARRS 1	ADE	1.6 km	MPC · JPL
769886	2015 TW_{309}	—	May 26, 2014	Haleakala	Pan-STARRS 1	MAR	770 m	MPC · JPL
769887	2015 TX_{310}	—	November 26, 2011	Haleakala	Pan-STARRS 1	·	1.6 km	MPC · JPL
769888	2015 TQ_{313}	—	October 19, 2006	Mount Lemmon	Mount Lemmon Survey	AGN	820 m	MPC · JPL
769889	2015 TY_{313}	—	October 13, 2010	Mount Lemmon	Mount Lemmon Survey	·	1.5 km	MPC · JPL
769890	2015 TG_{314}	—	November 24, 2011	Haleakala	Pan-STARRS 1	·	1.5 km	MPC · JPL
769891	2015 TA_{315}	—	September 20, 2001	Kitt Peak	Spacewatch	PAD	1.1 km	MPC · JPL
769892	2015 TM_{317}	—	October 24, 2011	Haleakala	Pan-STARRS 1	·	1.3 km	MPC · JPL
769893	2015 TD_{318}	—	October 8, 2007	Mount Lemmon	Mount Lemmon Survey	3:2	3.7 km	MPC · JPL
769894	2015 TC_{320}	—	October 31, 2011	Kitt Peak	Spacewatch	·	1.1 km	MPC · JPL
769895	2015 TS_{321}	—	July 25, 2015	Haleakala	Pan-STARRS 1	(1547)	1.3 km	MPC · JPL
769896	2015 TS_{322}	—	November 2, 2011	Mount Lemmon	Mount Lemmon Survey	MAR	710 m	MPC · JPL
769897	2015 TR_{325}	—	April 30, 2014	Haleakala	Pan-STARRS 1	·	1.3 km	MPC · JPL
769898	2015 TA_{326}	—	March 5, 2013	Mount Lemmon	Mount Lemmon Survey	·	1.3 km	MPC · JPL
769899	2015 TM_{327}	—	October 13, 2015	Haleakala	Pan-STARRS 1	·	1.3 km	MPC · JPL
769900	2015 TX_{327}	—	November 19, 2007	Kitt Peak	Spacewatch	MAR	750 m	MPC · JPL

== 769901–770000 ==
back to top

Designation			Discovery			Properties		Ref
Permanent	Provisional	Named after	Date	Site	Discoverer(s)	Category	Diam.	Ref
769901	2015 TS_{328}	—	January 26, 2006	Mount Lemmon	Mount Lemmon Survey	·	2.3 km	MPC · JPL
769902	2015 TL_{330}	—	April 24, 2014	Haleakala	Pan-STARRS 1	·	930 m	MPC · JPL
769903	2015 TV_{334}	—	April 24, 2014	Haleakala	Pan-STARRS 1	·	1.0 km	MPC · JPL
769904	2015 TN_{335}	—	September 12, 2015	Haleakala	Pan-STARRS 1	·	1.3 km	MPC · JPL
769905	2015 TF_{336}	—	October 21, 2011	Mount Lemmon	Mount Lemmon Survey	·	1.1 km	MPC · JPL
769906	2015 TH_{337}	—	April 24, 2014	Mount Lemmon	Mount Lemmon Survey	·	1.0 km	MPC · JPL
769907	2015 TR_{340}	—	July 26, 2015	Haleakala	Pan-STARRS 1	·	980 m	MPC · JPL
769908	2015 TG_{347}	—	October 26, 2011	Haleakala	Pan-STARRS 1	·	1.2 km	MPC · JPL
769909	2015 TH_{347}	—	November 17, 2006	Mount Lemmon	Mount Lemmon Survey	MRX	820 m	MPC · JPL
769910	2015 TU_{349}	—	May 6, 2014	Haleakala	Pan-STARRS 1	·	1.2 km	MPC · JPL
769911	2015 TV_{349}	—	October 15, 2015	Haleakala	Pan-STARRS 1	·	1.3 km	MPC · JPL
769912	2015 TD_{351}	—	November 24, 2011	Haleakala	Pan-STARRS 1	·	1.1 km	MPC · JPL
769913	2015 TL_{354}	—	September 9, 2015	Haleakala	Pan-STARRS 1	·	1.6 km	MPC · JPL
769914	2015 TU_{355}	—	December 16, 2007	Mount Lemmon	Mount Lemmon Survey	·	1.0 km	MPC · JPL
769915	2015 TK_{356}	—	October 9, 2015	Haleakala	Pan-STARRS 1	·	1.2 km	MPC · JPL
769916	2015 TD_{357}	—	August 30, 2002	Kitt Peak	Spacewatch	·	1.1 km	MPC · JPL
769917	2015 TV_{357}	—	October 10, 2015	Haleakala	Pan-STARRS 1	·	1.2 km	MPC · JPL
769918	2015 TY_{357}	—	October 10, 2015	Haleakala	Pan-STARRS 1	·	1.1 km	MPC · JPL
769919	2015 TJ_{358}	—	May 15, 2005	Mount Lemmon	Mount Lemmon Survey	·	1.2 km	MPC · JPL
769920	2015 TA_{360}	—	January 29, 2003	Apache Point	SDSS	·	1.3 km	MPC · JPL
769921	2015 TP_{360}	—	September 9, 2015	Haleakala	Pan-STARRS 1	·	1.5 km	MPC · JPL
769922	2015 TJ_{365}	—	September 9, 2015	Haleakala	Pan-STARRS 1	·	1.1 km	MPC · JPL
769923	2015 TZ_{365}	—	October 10, 2015	Haleakala	Pan-STARRS 1	·	1.2 km	MPC · JPL
769924	2015 TE_{366}	—	October 10, 2015	Haleakala	Pan-STARRS 1	·	1.3 km	MPC · JPL
769925	2015 TR_{366}	—	September 11, 2001	Kitt Peak	Spacewatch	·	3.1 km	MPC · JPL
769926	2015 TC_{369}	—	October 22, 2011	Kitt Peak	Spacewatch	(7744)	1.1 km	MPC · JPL
769927	2015 TF_{369}	—	October 20, 2011	Mount Lemmon	Mount Lemmon Survey	EUN	770 m	MPC · JPL
769928	2015 TQ_{369}	—	October 10, 2015	Haleakala	Pan-STARRS 1	·	1.0 km	MPC · JPL
769929	2015 TT_{371}	—	July 1, 2014	Haleakala	Pan-STARRS 1	HOF	2.0 km	MPC · JPL
769930	2015 TG_{372}	—	October 8, 2015	Haleakala	Pan-STARRS 1	·	880 m	MPC · JPL
769931	2015 TO_{372}	—	April 6, 2013	Haleakala	Pan-STARRS 1	·	1.6 km	MPC · JPL
769932	2015 TW_{372}	—	October 8, 2015	Haleakala	Pan-STARRS 1	·	980 m	MPC · JPL
769933	2015 TP_{373}	—	October 1, 2010	Kitt Peak	Spacewatch	PAD	990 m	MPC · JPL
769934	2015 TU_{374}	—	October 8, 2015	Haleakala	Pan-STARRS 1	·	2.1 km	MPC · JPL
769935	2015 TB_{376}	—	April 15, 2013	Haleakala	Pan-STARRS 1	·	1.6 km	MPC · JPL
769936	2015 TD_{377}	—	May 31, 2014	Haleakala	Pan-STARRS 1	·	1.4 km	MPC · JPL
769937	2015 TV_{379}	—	October 26, 2011	Haleakala	Pan-STARRS 1	·	1.0 km	MPC · JPL
769938	2015 TY_{379}	—	April 21, 2014	Mount Lemmon	Mount Lemmon Survey	EUN	1.0 km	MPC · JPL
769939	2015 TE_{380}	—	October 10, 2015	Haleakala	Pan-STARRS 1	·	1.2 km	MPC · JPL
769940	2015 TU_{380}	—	October 10, 2015	Haleakala	Pan-STARRS 1	·	1.4 km	MPC · JPL
769941	2015 TA_{381}	—	November 16, 2011	Mount Lemmon	Mount Lemmon Survey	MAR	810 m	MPC · JPL
769942	2015 TJ_{381}	—	October 10, 2015	Haleakala	Pan-STARRS 1	WIT	730 m	MPC · JPL
769943	2015 TT_{381}	—	November 18, 2011	Mount Lemmon	Mount Lemmon Survey	·	910 m	MPC · JPL
769944	2015 TE_{382}	—	October 10, 2015	Haleakala	Pan-STARRS 1	·	2.6 km	MPC · JPL
769945	2015 TW_{383}	—	October 12, 2015	Haleakala	Pan-STARRS 1	WIT	820 m	MPC · JPL
769946	2015 TE_{385}	—	October 9, 2010	Mount Lemmon	Mount Lemmon Survey	KOR	950 m	MPC · JPL
769947	2015 TV_{385}	—	January 29, 2012	Mount Lemmon	Mount Lemmon Survey	·	1.1 km	MPC · JPL
769948	2015 TR_{386}	—	November 4, 2004	Kitt Peak	Spacewatch	·	2.5 km	MPC · JPL
769949	2015 TF_{388}	—	October 8, 2015	Haleakala	Pan-STARRS 1	·	1.4 km	MPC · JPL
769950	2015 TM_{388}	—	October 8, 2015	Mount Lemmon	Mount Lemmon Survey	·	1.5 km	MPC · JPL
769951	2015 TN_{388}	—	October 10, 2015	Haleakala	Pan-STARRS 1	EUN	790 m	MPC · JPL
769952	2015 TP_{388}	—	October 10, 2015	Haleakala	Pan-STARRS 1	·	960 m	MPC · JPL
769953	2015 TD_{389}	—	October 3, 2015	Mount Lemmon	Mount Lemmon Survey	·	1.1 km	MPC · JPL
769954	2015 TS_{389}	—	October 8, 2015	Haleakala	Pan-STARRS 1	·	1.2 km	MPC · JPL
769955	2015 TT_{389}	—	April 16, 2013	Cerro Tololo-DECam	DECam	HNS	620 m	MPC · JPL
769956	2015 TR_{391}	—	October 11, 2015	Mount Lemmon	Mount Lemmon Survey	·	1.1 km	MPC · JPL
769957	2015 TS_{395}	—	September 20, 2006	Kitt Peak	Spacewatch	·	1.2 km	MPC · JPL
769958	2015 TT_{399}	—	October 12, 2015	Mount Lemmon	Mount Lemmon Survey	·	1.8 km	MPC · JPL
769959	2015 TQ_{401}	—	July 21, 2006	Mount Lemmon	Mount Lemmon Survey	·	1.0 km	MPC · JPL
769960	2015 TZ_{408}	—	October 8, 2015	Haleakala	Pan-STARRS 1	·	1.5 km	MPC · JPL
769961	2015 TF_{409}	—	October 13, 2015	Haleakala	Pan-STARRS 1	·	920 m	MPC · JPL
769962	2015 TP_{409}	—	October 10, 2015	Haleakala	Pan-STARRS 1	·	1.4 km	MPC · JPL
769963	2015 TF_{411}	—	October 10, 2015	Haleakala	Pan-STARRS 1	·	1.1 km	MPC · JPL
769964	2015 TH_{411}	—	October 10, 2015	Haleakala	Pan-STARRS 1	·	750 m	MPC · JPL
769965	2015 TQ_{411}	—	October 10, 2015	Haleakala	Pan-STARRS 1	·	1.6 km	MPC · JPL
769966	2015 TU_{412}	—	October 9, 2015	Haleakala	Pan-STARRS 1	·	1.5 km	MPC · JPL
769967	2015 TY_{412}	—	October 9, 2015	Haleakala	Pan-STARRS 1	·	1.0 km	MPC · JPL
769968	2015 TS_{416}	—	October 13, 2015	Mount Lemmon	Mount Lemmon Survey	·	1.2 km	MPC · JPL
769969	2015 TO_{417}	—	October 3, 2015	Mount Lemmon	Mount Lemmon Survey	·	1.2 km	MPC · JPL
769970	2015 TB_{418}	—	October 9, 2015	Haleakala	Pan-STARRS 1	·	980 m	MPC · JPL
769971	2015 TC_{422}	—	October 12, 2015	Haleakala	Pan-STARRS 1	EOS	1.6 km	MPC · JPL
769972	2015 TG_{428}	—	October 12, 2015	Mount Lemmon	Mount Lemmon Survey	HNS	730 m	MPC · JPL
769973	2015 TG_{432}	—	October 2, 2015	Kitt Peak	Spacewatch	·	1.3 km	MPC · JPL
769974	2015 TB_{437}	—	October 14, 2015	Kitt Peak	Spacewatch	·	1.3 km	MPC · JPL
769975	2015 TU_{442}	—	October 12, 2015	Haleakala	Pan-STARRS 1	·	880 m	MPC · JPL
769976	2015 TN_{443}	—	October 9, 2015	Haleakala	Pan-STARRS 1	·	1.0 km	MPC · JPL
769977	2015 TC_{444}	—	October 10, 2015	Haleakala	Pan-STARRS 1	·	1.4 km	MPC · JPL
769978	2015 TK_{444}	—	October 8, 2015	Haleakala	Pan-STARRS 1	·	1.1 km	MPC · JPL
769979	2015 TC_{445}	—	October 8, 2015	Mount Lemmon	Mount Lemmon Survey	·	1.2 km	MPC · JPL
769980	2015 TP_{450}	—	October 13, 2015	Mount Lemmon	Mount Lemmon Survey	3:2	3.7 km	MPC · JPL
769981	2015 TQ_{450}	—	October 10, 2015	Haleakala	Pan-STARRS 1	·	1.1 km	MPC · JPL
769982	2015 TL_{466}	—	October 12, 2007	Kitt Peak	Spacewatch	·	980 m	MPC · JPL
769983	2015 UU	—	September 12, 2015	Haleakala	Pan-STARRS 1	·	1.6 km	MPC · JPL
769984	2015 UR_{3}	—	August 12, 2015	Haleakala	Pan-STARRS 1	·	1.5 km	MPC · JPL
769985	2015 UC_{4}	—	September 12, 2015	Haleakala	Pan-STARRS 1	(5)	870 m	MPC · JPL
769986	2015 UJ_{7}	—	August 21, 2015	Haleakala	Pan-STARRS 1	·	1.3 km	MPC · JPL
769987	2015 UN_{10}	—	April 22, 2009	Mount Lemmon	Mount Lemmon Survey	·	1.4 km	MPC · JPL
769988	2015 UQ_{10}	—	October 18, 2015	Haleakala	Pan-STARRS 1	·	1.2 km	MPC · JPL
769989	2015 UQ_{15}	—	September 12, 2015	Haleakala	Pan-STARRS 1	·	1.4 km	MPC · JPL
769990	2015 UB_{21}	—	October 15, 2015	Catalina	CSS	·	850 m	MPC · JPL
769991	2015 UC_{21}	—	September 11, 2015	Haleakala	Pan-STARRS 1	·	1.4 km	MPC · JPL
769992	2015 UH_{23}	—	October 2, 2006	Mount Lemmon	Mount Lemmon Survey	·	1.2 km	MPC · JPL
769993	2015 UX_{23}	—	February 7, 2008	Mount Lemmon	Mount Lemmon Survey	·	1.4 km	MPC · JPL
769994	2015 UV_{29}	—	October 18, 2015	Haleakala	Pan-STARRS 1	THM	1.7 km	MPC · JPL
769995	2015 UK_{30}	—	March 8, 2013	Haleakala	Pan-STARRS 1	·	1.2 km	MPC · JPL
769996	2015 UP_{31}	—	October 24, 2011	Haleakala	Pan-STARRS 1	·	920 m	MPC · JPL
769997	2015 UV_{33}	—	September 9, 2015	Haleakala	Pan-STARRS 1	·	1.3 km	MPC · JPL
769998	2015 UD_{37}	—	September 23, 2015	Haleakala	Pan-STARRS 1	·	1.4 km	MPC · JPL
769999	2015 UD_{40}	—	September 9, 2015	Haleakala	Pan-STARRS 1	·	1.4 km	MPC · JPL
770000	2015 UA_{41}	—	November 25, 2011	Haleakala	Pan-STARRS 1	·	960 m	MPC · JPL

back to top

== Meaning of names ==
As minor planet discoveries are confirmed, they are given a permanent number by the IAU's Minor Planet Center (MPC), and the discoverers can then submit names for them, following the IAU's naming conventions. The list below concerns those minor planets in the specified number-range that have received names, and explains the meanings of those names.

Official naming citations of newly named small Solar System bodies are approved and published in a bulletin by IAU's Working Group for Small Bodies Nomenclature (WGSBN). Before May 2021, citations were published in MPC's Minor Planet Circulars for many decades. Recent citations can also be found on the JPL Small-Body Database (SBDB). Until his death in 2016, German astronomer Lutz D. Schmadel compiled these citations into the Dictionary of Minor Planet Names (DMP) and regularly updated the collection.

Based on Paul Herget's The Names of the Minor Planets, Schmadel also researched the unclear origin of numerous asteroids, most of which had been named prior to World War II. This article incorporates text from this source, which is in the public domain: SBDB New namings may only be added to this list below after official publication as the preannouncement of names is condemned. The WGSBN publishes a comprehensive guideline for the naming rules of non-cometary small Solar System bodies.

Named minor planet	Provisional	This minor planet was named for...	Ref · Catalog
769288 Varadinagypal	2015 MT_{66}	Pal Varadi Nagy, Hungarian-Romanian software engineer and amateur astronomer, writer and former radio presenter.	IAU · 769288
769584 Pteancu	2015 QD_{19}	Mircea Pteancu, Romanian mechanical engineer and amateur astronomer.	IAU · 769584
