= List of minor planets: 785001–786000 =

The following is a partial list of minor planets, running from minor-planet number 785001 through 786000, inclusive. The primary data for this and other partial lists is based on JPL's "Small-Body Orbital Elements" and data available from the Minor Planet Center. Critical list information is also provided by the MPC, unless otherwise specified from Lowell Observatory. A detailed description of the table's columns and additional sources are given on the main page including a complete list of every page in this series, and a statistical break-up on the dynamical classification of minor planets.

Also see the summary list of all named bodies in numerical and alphabetical order, and the corresponding naming citations for the number range of this particular list. New namings may only be added to this list after official publication, as the preannouncement of names is condemned by the Working Group for Small Bodies Nomenclature of the International Astronomical Union.

Near-Earth obj.	MBA (inner)	MBA (outer)	Centaur
Mars-crosser	MBA (middle)	Jupiter trojan	Trans-Neptunian obj.
Unclassified

== 785001–785100 ==
Designation			Discovery			Properties		Ref
Permanent	Provisional	Named after	Date	Site	Discoverer(s)	Category	Diam.	Ref
785001	2015 GD_{61}	—	April 12, 2015	Haleakala	Pan-STARRS 1	·	1.8 km	MPC · JPL
785002	2015 GL_{62}	—	April 15, 2015	Mount Lemmon	Mount Lemmon Survey	·	2.1 km	MPC · JPL
785003	2015 GR_{62}	—	April 9, 2015	Mount Lemmon	Mount Lemmon Survey	·	1.3 km	MPC · JPL
785004	2015 GW_{62}	—	April 13, 2015	Haleakala	Pan-STARRS 1	·	2.3 km	MPC · JPL
785005	2015 GH_{64}	—	April 10, 2015	Mount Lemmon	Mount Lemmon Survey	·	1.8 km	MPC · JPL
785006	2015 GX_{64}	—	April 10, 2015	Haleakala	Pan-STARRS 1	·	2.2 km	MPC · JPL
785007	2015 GF_{67}	—	February 26, 2014	Haleakala	Pan-STARRS 1	L4	7.2 km	MPC · JPL
785008	2015 GA_{68}	—	April 12, 2015	Haleakala	Pan-STARRS 1	·	1.4 km	MPC · JPL
785009	2015 GC_{68}	—	April 13, 2015	Haleakala	Pan-STARRS 1	EOS	1.3 km	MPC · JPL
785010	2015 GO_{68}	—	April 15, 2015	Mount Lemmon	Mount Lemmon Survey	L4	6.5 km	MPC · JPL
785011	2015 GQ_{68}	—	April 14, 2015	Mount Lemmon	Mount Lemmon Survey	L4	5.5 km	MPC · JPL
785012	2015 GJ_{69}	—	April 10, 2015	Mount Lemmon	Mount Lemmon Survey	L4	5.1 km	MPC · JPL
785013	2015 GW_{69}	—	April 10, 2015	Mount Lemmon	Mount Lemmon Survey	·	1.3 km	MPC · JPL
785014	2015 GH_{70}	—	April 14, 2015	Mount Lemmon	Mount Lemmon Survey	L4	6.5 km	MPC · JPL
785015	2015 GP_{70}	—	April 10, 2015	Mount Lemmon	Mount Lemmon Survey	·	1.8 km	MPC · JPL
785016	2015 GG_{72}	—	April 13, 2015	Haleakala	Pan-STARRS 1	L4	5.9 km	MPC · JPL
785017	2015 GV_{74}	—	April 13, 2015	Mount Lemmon	Mount Lemmon Survey	·	1.8 km	MPC · JPL
785018	2015 GD_{81}	—	April 10, 2015	Haleakala	Pan-STARRS 1	·	1.4 km	MPC · JPL
785019	2015 GK_{81}	—	April 14, 2015	Mount Lemmon	Mount Lemmon Survey	L4	6.2 km	MPC · JPL
785020	2015 GO_{83}	—	April 14, 2015	Mount Lemmon	Mount Lemmon Survey	VER	1.8 km	MPC · JPL
785021	2015 HG_{7}	—	January 28, 2015	Haleakala	Pan-STARRS 1	·	1.9 km	MPC · JPL
785022	2015 HU_{12}	—	April 17, 2015	Mount Lemmon	Mount Lemmon Survey	·	1.4 km	MPC · JPL
785023	2015 HS_{13}	—	November 13, 2012	Mount Lemmon	Mount Lemmon Survey	·	2.4 km	MPC · JPL
785024	2015 HZ_{13}	—	April 18, 2015	Mount Lemmon	Mount Lemmon Survey	·	1.5 km	MPC · JPL
785025	2015 HA_{19}	—	March 21, 2015	Mount Lemmon	Mount Lemmon Survey	·	1.3 km	MPC · JPL
785026	2015 HL_{19}	—	March 27, 2015	Kitt Peak	Spacewatch	·	1.3 km	MPC · JPL
785027	2015 HV_{19}	—	March 21, 2015	Mount Lemmon	Mount Lemmon Survey	·	1.9 km	MPC · JPL
785028	2015 HY_{19}	—	February 23, 2015	Haleakala	Pan-STARRS 1	·	1.6 km	MPC · JPL
785029	2015 HO_{23}	—	January 28, 2015	Haleakala	Pan-STARRS 1	·	2.1 km	MPC · JPL
785030	2015 HO_{27}	—	April 15, 2015	Mount Lemmon	Mount Lemmon Survey	·	1.2 km	MPC · JPL
785031	2015 HY_{32}	—	October 18, 2012	Haleakala	Pan-STARRS 1	·	2.4 km	MPC · JPL
785032	2015 HA_{34}	—	April 16, 2015	Cerro Paranal	Gaia Ground Based Optical Tracking	KOR	970 m	MPC · JPL
785033	2015 HS_{37}	—	April 20, 2015	Haleakala	Pan-STARRS 1	·	1.9 km	MPC · JPL
785034	2015 HU_{40}	—	April 20, 2015	Haleakala	Pan-STARRS 1	(194)	820 m	MPC · JPL
785035	2015 HG_{43}	—	February 23, 2015	Haleakala	Pan-STARRS 1	H	340 m	MPC · JPL
785036	2015 HH_{45}	—	November 9, 2013	Haleakala	Pan-STARRS 1	·	1.3 km	MPC · JPL
785037	2015 HW_{45}	—	April 16, 2015	Haleakala	Pan-STARRS 1	L4	5.9 km	MPC · JPL
785038	2015 HD_{48}	—	April 9, 2010	Mount Lemmon	Mount Lemmon Survey	EOS	1.6 km	MPC · JPL
785039	2015 HE_{48}	—	December 31, 2013	Haleakala	Pan-STARRS 1	VER	2.0 km	MPC · JPL
785040	2015 HG_{48}	—	March 25, 2015	Haleakala	Pan-STARRS 1	·	1.9 km	MPC · JPL
785041	2015 HL_{49}	—	March 25, 2015	Haleakala	Pan-STARRS 1	·	1.6 km	MPC · JPL
785042	2015 HZ_{50}	—	April 16, 2015	Haleakala	Pan-STARRS 1	EOS	1.4 km	MPC · JPL
785043	2015 HD_{63}	—	March 17, 2015	Haleakala	Pan-STARRS 1	·	1.7 km	MPC · JPL
785044	2015 HB_{71}	—	March 15, 2004	Kitt Peak	Spacewatch	·	1.6 km	MPC · JPL
785045	2015 HX_{77}	—	April 23, 2015	Haleakala	Pan-STARRS 1	·	1.3 km	MPC · JPL
785046	2015 HW_{84}	—	April 23, 2015	Haleakala	Pan-STARRS 1	THM	1.7 km	MPC · JPL
785047	2015 HU_{94}	—	April 23, 2015	Haleakala	Pan-STARRS 1	·	2.1 km	MPC · JPL
785048	2015 HL_{97}	—	April 23, 2015	Haleakala	Pan-STARRS 1	VER	2.2 km	MPC · JPL
785049	2015 HR_{97}	—	November 14, 2007	Kitt Peak	Spacewatch	THM	1.6 km	MPC · JPL
785050	2015 HJ_{101}	—	April 23, 2015	Haleakala	Pan-STARRS 1	·	2.2 km	MPC · JPL
785051	2015 HM_{101}	—	January 25, 2009	Kitt Peak	Spacewatch	·	1.6 km	MPC · JPL
785052	2015 HQ_{102}	—	January 28, 2015	Haleakala	Pan-STARRS 1	EUN	720 m	MPC · JPL
785053	2015 HW_{102}	—	April 23, 2015	Haleakala	Pan-STARRS 1	·	740 m	MPC · JPL
785054	2015 HT_{104}	—	April 23, 2015	Haleakala	Pan-STARRS 1	EOS	1.2 km	MPC · JPL
785055	2015 HU_{104}	—	April 10, 2015	Kitt Peak	Spacewatch	·	2.1 km	MPC · JPL
785056	2015 HL_{105}	—	January 25, 2014	Haleakala	Pan-STARRS 1	·	2.6 km	MPC · JPL
785057	2015 HP_{106}	—	February 23, 2015	Haleakala	Pan-STARRS 1	·	2.3 km	MPC · JPL
785058	2015 HV_{106}	—	October 23, 2011	Haleakala	Pan-STARRS 1	THB	2.2 km	MPC · JPL
785059	2015 HB_{108}	—	April 11, 2015	Kitt Peak	Spacewatch	·	2.1 km	MPC · JPL
785060	2015 HR_{109}	—	April 23, 2015	Haleakala	Pan-STARRS 1	·	2.3 km	MPC · JPL
785061	2015 HF_{110}	—	April 13, 2015	Haleakala	Pan-STARRS 1	·	1.8 km	MPC · JPL
785062	2015 HF_{113}	—	March 28, 2015	Haleakala	Pan-STARRS 1	·	2.2 km	MPC · JPL
785063	2015 HX_{113}	—	March 28, 2015	Haleakala	Pan-STARRS 1	·	2.1 km	MPC · JPL
785064	2015 HZ_{113}	—	March 21, 2015	Haleakala	Pan-STARRS 1	·	1.6 km	MPC · JPL
785065	2015 HY_{121}	—	April 23, 2015	Haleakala	Pan-STARRS 1	THM	1.9 km	MPC · JPL
785066	2015 HA_{123}	—	April 23, 2015	Haleakala	Pan-STARRS 1	·	720 m	MPC · JPL
785067	2015 HW_{131}	—	November 9, 2007	Mount Lemmon	Mount Lemmon Survey	·	1.6 km	MPC · JPL
785068	2015 HX_{132}	—	September 21, 2011	Haleakala	Pan-STARRS 1	·	1.9 km	MPC · JPL
785069	2015 HD_{137}	—	April 23, 2015	Haleakala	Pan-STARRS 1	·	1.9 km	MPC · JPL
785070	2015 HW_{137}	—	April 23, 2015	Haleakala	Pan-STARRS 1	·	1.8 km	MPC · JPL
785071	2015 HF_{139}	—	December 3, 2010	Mount Lemmon	Mount Lemmon Survey	L4	5.8 km	MPC · JPL
785072	2015 HR_{139}	—	October 15, 2012	Mount Lemmon	Mount Lemmon Survey	AST	1.2 km	MPC · JPL
785073	2015 HZ_{143}	—	April 23, 2015	Haleakala	Pan-STARRS 1	·	1.2 km	MPC · JPL
785074	2015 HZ_{162}	—	April 10, 2015	Mount Lemmon	Mount Lemmon Survey	·	2.4 km	MPC · JPL
785075	2015 HQ_{167}	—	September 26, 2011	Mount Lemmon	Mount Lemmon Survey	·	1.8 km	MPC · JPL
785076	2015 HS_{167}	—	April 24, 2015	Haleakala	Pan-STARRS 1	AGN	980 m	MPC · JPL
785077	2015 HB_{179}	—	February 14, 2015	Mount Lemmon	Mount Lemmon Survey	·	2.0 km	MPC · JPL
785078	2015 HD_{184}	—	April 25, 2015	Haleakala	Pan-STARRS 1	·	1.9 km	MPC · JPL
785079	2015 HQ_{187}	—	September 24, 2011	Mount Lemmon	Mount Lemmon Survey	EOS	1.2 km	MPC · JPL
785080	2015 HR_{189}	—	April 18, 2015	Haleakala	Pan-STARRS 1	MAR	710 m	MPC · JPL
785081	2015 HT_{190}	—	April 23, 2015	Haleakala	Pan-STARRS 1	·	1.8 km	MPC · JPL
785082	2015 HW_{191}	—	April 23, 2015	Haleakala	Pan-STARRS 1	·	2.4 km	MPC · JPL
785083	2015 HQ_{193}	—	April 25, 2015	Haleakala	Pan-STARRS 1	·	1.5 km	MPC · JPL
785084	2015 HD_{200}	—	April 23, 2015	Haleakala	Pan-STARRS 1	(1118)	2.4 km	MPC · JPL
785085	2015 HO_{200}	—	April 25, 2015	Haleakala	Pan-STARRS 1	·	2.9 km	MPC · JPL
785086	2015 HB_{202}	—	April 16, 2015	Mount Lemmon	Mount Lemmon Survey	·	1.8 km	MPC · JPL
785087	2015 HW_{207}	—	April 23, 2015	Haleakala	Pan-STARRS 1	VER	1.8 km	MPC · JPL
785088	2015 HN_{208}	—	April 23, 2015	Haleakala	Pan-STARRS 1	·	1.8 km	MPC · JPL
785089	2015 HO_{209}	—	April 20, 2015	Haleakala	Pan-STARRS 1	·	1.9 km	MPC · JPL
785090	2015 HR_{209}	—	April 16, 2015	Haleakala	Pan-STARRS 1	·	2.2 km	MPC · JPL
785091	2015 HS_{209}	—	April 25, 2015	Haleakala	Pan-STARRS 1	·	1.9 km	MPC · JPL
785092	2015 HU_{209}	—	April 25, 2015	Haleakala	Pan-STARRS 1	·	1.3 km	MPC · JPL
785093	2015 HO_{210}	—	April 25, 2015	Haleakala	Pan-STARRS 1	·	1.7 km	MPC · JPL
785094	2015 HR_{210}	—	April 23, 2015	Haleakala	Pan-STARRS 1	THM	1.5 km	MPC · JPL
785095	2015 HS_{210}	—	April 25, 2015	Haleakala	Pan-STARRS 1	·	2.0 km	MPC · JPL
785096	2015 HG_{211}	—	April 24, 2015	Haleakala	Pan-STARRS 1	THM	1.6 km	MPC · JPL
785097	2015 HL_{211}	—	April 18, 2015	Haleakala	Pan-STARRS 1	·	2.2 km	MPC · JPL
785098	2015 HG_{212}	—	April 25, 2015	Haleakala	Pan-STARRS 1	·	1.3 km	MPC · JPL
785099	2015 HY_{212}	—	April 16, 2015	Haleakala	Pan-STARRS 1	·	1.4 km	MPC · JPL
785100	2015 HG_{213}	—	April 17, 2015	Mount Lemmon	Mount Lemmon Survey	·	970 m	MPC · JPL

== 785101–785200 ==
back to top

Designation			Discovery			Properties		Ref
Permanent	Provisional	Named after	Date	Site	Discoverer(s)	Category	Diam.	Ref
785101	2015 HT_{213}	—	April 25, 2015	Haleakala	Pan-STARRS 1	EOS	1.3 km	MPC · JPL
785102	2015 HU_{213}	—	April 18, 2015	Haleakala	Pan-STARRS 1	·	2.0 km	MPC · JPL
785103	2015 HC_{214}	—	April 24, 2015	Haleakala	Pan-STARRS 1	·	2.0 km	MPC · JPL
785104	2015 HK_{217}	—	April 16, 2015	Mount Lemmon	Mount Lemmon Survey	·	1.7 km	MPC · JPL
785105	2015 HP_{217}	—	August 31, 2017	Haleakala	Pan-STARRS 1	·	2.0 km	MPC · JPL
785106	2015 HT_{219}	—	April 25, 2015	Haleakala	Pan-STARRS 1	·	2.1 km	MPC · JPL
785107	2015 HH_{220}	—	April 16, 2015	Haleakala	Pan-STARRS 1	·	2.2 km	MPC · JPL
785108	2015 HC_{223}	—	April 23, 2015	Haleakala	Pan-STARRS 1	·	2.0 km	MPC · JPL
785109	2015 HK_{224}	—	April 23, 2015	Haleakala	Pan-STARRS 1	·	1.6 km	MPC · JPL
785110	2015 HC_{227}	—	April 24, 2015	Haleakala	Pan-STARRS 1	·	2.2 km	MPC · JPL
785111	2015 HN_{227}	—	April 23, 2015	Haleakala	Pan-STARRS 1	·	2.1 km	MPC · JPL
785112	2015 HV_{227}	—	September 19, 2011	Mount Lemmon	Mount Lemmon Survey	EOS	1.4 km	MPC · JPL
785113	2015 HD_{228}	—	April 19, 2015	Mount Lemmon	Mount Lemmon Survey	·	2.0 km	MPC · JPL
785114	2015 HG_{228}	—	April 17, 2015	Mount Lemmon	Mount Lemmon Survey	·	1.6 km	MPC · JPL
785115	2015 HX_{228}	—	April 18, 2015	Cerro Tololo	DECam	·	2.0 km	MPC · JPL
785116	2015 HN_{229}	—	April 18, 2015	Cerro Tololo	DECam	·	1.8 km	MPC · JPL
785117	2015 HX_{229}	—	April 18, 2015	Cerro Tololo	DECam	·	1.8 km	MPC · JPL
785118	2015 HG_{230}	—	April 18, 2015	Mount Lemmon	Mount Lemmon Survey	·	2.0 km	MPC · JPL
785119	2015 HP_{232}	—	October 20, 2007	Mount Lemmon	Mount Lemmon Survey	·	2.3 km	MPC · JPL
785120	2015 HZ_{232}	—	April 25, 2015	Haleakala	Pan-STARRS 1	KOR	840 m	MPC · JPL
785121	2015 HQ_{233}	—	April 17, 2015	Cerro Tololo	DECam	·	1.8 km	MPC · JPL
785122	2015 HA_{234}	—	April 18, 2015	Cerro Tololo	DECam	·	1.8 km	MPC · JPL
785123	2015 HW_{234}	—	April 18, 2015	Cerro Tololo	DECam	VER	1.9 km	MPC · JPL
785124	2015 HY_{237}	—	April 18, 2015	Cerro Tololo	DECam	·	2.2 km	MPC · JPL
785125	2015 HY_{241}	—	April 18, 2015	Cerro Tololo	DECam	L4	6.0 km	MPC · JPL
785126	2015 HZ_{241}	—	April 21, 2015	Cerro Tololo	DECam	L4	5.8 km	MPC · JPL
785127	2015 HQ_{246}	—	April 19, 2015	Cerro Tololo	DECam	·	2.2 km	MPC · JPL
785128	2015 HS_{247}	—	February 19, 2009	Kitt Peak	Spacewatch	THM	1.6 km	MPC · JPL
785129	2015 HW_{248}	—	April 18, 2015	Cerro Tololo	DECam	·	1.9 km	MPC · JPL
785130	2015 HM_{255}	—	December 23, 2013	Mount Lemmon	Mount Lemmon Survey	·	1.8 km	MPC · JPL
785131	2015 HR_{255}	—	April 20, 2015	Haleakala	Pan-STARRS 1	L4	6.4 km	MPC · JPL
785132	2015 HW_{257}	—	April 18, 2015	Cerro Tololo	DECam	EOS	1.3 km	MPC · JPL
785133	2015 HV_{260}	—	April 19, 2015	Cerro Tololo	DECam	·	2.1 km	MPC · JPL
785134	2015 HJ_{262}	—	April 18, 2015	Mount Lemmon	Mount Lemmon Survey	·	1.9 km	MPC · JPL
785135	2015 HB_{267}	—	October 22, 2012	Kitt Peak	Spacewatch	·	2.3 km	MPC · JPL
785136	2015 HD_{284}	—	April 18, 2015	Cerro Tololo	DECam	·	2.4 km	MPC · JPL
785137	2015 HE_{284}	—	April 18, 2015	Cerro Tololo	DECam	VER	2.0 km	MPC · JPL
785138	2015 HG_{287}	—	April 18, 2015	Cerro Tololo	DECam	·	2.3 km	MPC · JPL
785139	2015 HR_{287}	—	April 18, 2015	Cerro Tololo	DECam	·	1.8 km	MPC · JPL
785140	2015 HU_{287}	—	April 18, 2015	Mount Lemmon	Mount Lemmon Survey	·	2.2 km	MPC · JPL
785141	2015 HX_{287}	—	April 14, 2015	Mount Lemmon	Mount Lemmon Survey	·	2.3 km	MPC · JPL
785142	2015 HP_{288}	—	April 18, 2015	Cerro Tololo	DECam	·	2.1 km	MPC · JPL
785143	2015 HZ_{288}	—	April 18, 2015	Cerro Tololo	DECam	·	1.8 km	MPC · JPL
785144	2015 HR_{289}	—	April 17, 2015	Cerro Tololo	DECam	EOS	1.2 km	MPC · JPL
785145	2015 HV_{289}	—	April 19, 2015	Cerro Tololo	DECam	·	1.6 km	MPC · JPL
785146	2015 HW_{290}	—	April 18, 2015	Cerro Tololo	DECam	·	1.6 km	MPC · JPL
785147	2015 HB_{291}	—	April 18, 2015	Cerro Tololo	DECam	VER	1.8 km	MPC · JPL
785148	2015 HB_{292}	—	October 18, 2012	Mount Lemmon	Mount Lemmon Survey	·	2.0 km	MPC · JPL
785149	2015 HO_{292}	—	April 19, 2015	Cerro Tololo	DECam	·	1.5 km	MPC · JPL
785150	2015 HP_{292}	—	April 19, 2015	Cerro Tololo	DECam	·	2.1 km	MPC · JPL
785151	2015 HS_{293}	—	April 18, 2015	Cerro Tololo	DECam	·	2.1 km	MPC · JPL
785152	2015 HD_{294}	—	April 18, 2015	Mount Lemmon	Mount Lemmon Survey	·	1.7 km	MPC · JPL
785153	2015 HS_{295}	—	April 18, 2015	Cerro Tololo	DECam	·	1.8 km	MPC · JPL
785154	2015 HD_{300}	—	October 9, 2012	Mount Lemmon	Mount Lemmon Survey	·	1.4 km	MPC · JPL
785155	2015 HT_{304}	—	April 18, 2015	Cerro Tololo	DECam	L4	5.6 km	MPC · JPL
785156	2015 HN_{306}	—	September 6, 2008	Mount Lemmon	Mount Lemmon Survey	·	1.1 km	MPC · JPL
785157	2015 HL_{314}	—	April 18, 2015	Cerro Tololo	DECam	VER	1.6 km	MPC · JPL
785158	2015 HE_{315}	—	October 23, 2012	Mount Lemmon	Mount Lemmon Survey	·	2.0 km	MPC · JPL
785159	2015 HE_{322}	—	April 18, 2015	Cerro Tololo	DECam	·	1.9 km	MPC · JPL
785160	2015 HK_{322}	—	February 27, 2009	Kitt Peak	Spacewatch	·	1.9 km	MPC · JPL
785161	2015 HS_{325}	—	April 18, 2015	Cerro Tololo	DECam	·	1.8 km	MPC · JPL
785162	2015 HB_{332}	—	April 18, 2015	Cerro Tololo	DECam	·	930 m	MPC · JPL
785163	2015 HP_{334}	—	April 18, 2015	Cerro Tololo	DECam	·	2.1 km	MPC · JPL
785164	2015 HR_{334}	—	April 18, 2015	Cerro Tololo	DECam	VER	2.1 km	MPC · JPL
785165	2015 HB_{337}	—	April 18, 2015	Cerro Tololo	DECam	EOS	1.0 km	MPC · JPL
785166	2015 HJ_{338}	—	September 26, 2006	Kitt Peak	Spacewatch	·	1.8 km	MPC · JPL
785167	2015 HN_{338}	—	April 19, 2015	Cerro Tololo	DECam	L4	5.6 km	MPC · JPL
785168	2015 HQ_{343}	—	April 18, 2015	Cerro Tololo	DECam	·	2.0 km	MPC · JPL
785169	2015 HV_{344}	—	April 17, 2015	Cerro Tololo	DECam	·	1.9 km	MPC · JPL
785170	2015 HW_{346}	—	April 19, 2015	Cerro Tololo	DECam	URS	2.2 km	MPC · JPL
785171	2015 HC_{348}	—	January 22, 2015	Haleakala	Pan-STARRS 1	VER	2.3 km	MPC · JPL
785172	2015 HM_{348}	—	April 18, 2015	Cerro Tololo	DECam	·	1.9 km	MPC · JPL
785173	2015 HV_{348}	—	April 21, 2015	Cerro Tololo	DECam	VER	1.9 km	MPC · JPL
785174	2015 HW_{348}	—	April 18, 2015	Cerro Tololo	DECam	·	2.2 km	MPC · JPL
785175	2015 HJ_{349}	—	April 18, 2015	Cerro Tololo	DECam	·	1.8 km	MPC · JPL
785176	2015 HJ_{350}	—	April 18, 2015	Cerro Tololo	DECam	VER	1.7 km	MPC · JPL
785177	2015 HQ_{350}	—	April 18, 2015	Cerro Tololo	DECam	·	2.0 km	MPC · JPL
785178	2015 HY_{350}	—	April 18, 2015	Cerro Tololo	DECam	·	1.8 km	MPC · JPL
785179	2015 HJ_{351}	—	April 18, 2015	Cerro Tololo	DECam	·	1.6 km	MPC · JPL
785180	2015 HA_{352}	—	April 23, 2015	Haleakala	Pan-STARRS 1	·	1.6 km	MPC · JPL
785181	2015 HK_{352}	—	April 19, 2015	Cerro Tololo	DECam	EOS	1.2 km	MPC · JPL
785182	2015 HS_{352}	—	April 17, 2015	Cerro Tololo	DECam	EOS	1.3 km	MPC · JPL
785183	2015 HU_{352}	—	April 18, 2015	Cerro Tololo	DECam	EOS	1.2 km	MPC · JPL
785184	2015 HB_{353}	—	April 23, 2015	Haleakala	Pan-STARRS 1	·	1.7 km	MPC · JPL
785185	2015 HF_{353}	—	April 18, 2015	Cerro Tololo	DECam	ELF	2.2 km	MPC · JPL
785186	2015 HJ_{354}	—	April 25, 2015	Haleakala	Pan-STARRS 1	L4	6.0 km	MPC · JPL
785187	2015 HR_{355}	—	April 23, 2015	Haleakala	Pan-STARRS 1	·	1.9 km	MPC · JPL
785188	2015 HW_{356}	—	April 18, 2015	Cerro Tololo	DECam	·	1.7 km	MPC · JPL
785189	2015 HF_{357}	—	April 18, 2015	Cerro Tololo	DECam	L4	5.5 km	MPC · JPL
785190	2015 HG_{357}	—	April 19, 2015	Cerro Tololo	DECam	L4	5.4 km	MPC · JPL
785191	2015 HC_{358}	—	April 25, 2015	Cerro Tololo-DECam	DECam	L4	5.0 km	MPC · JPL
785192	2015 HX_{358}	—	April 19, 2015	Cerro Tololo	DECam	EOS	1.1 km	MPC · JPL
785193	2015 HW_{384}	—	April 20, 2015	Haleakala	Pan-STARRS 1	·	2.9 km	MPC · JPL
785194	2015 HH_{445}	—	April 18, 2015	Cerro Tololo	DECam	·	1.5 km	MPC · JPL
785195	2015 JP_{4}	—	April 18, 2015	Haleakala	Pan-STARRS 1	·	1.9 km	MPC · JPL
785196	2015 JW_{6}	—	April 20, 2015	Haleakala	Pan-STARRS 1	VER	2.0 km	MPC · JPL
785197	2015 JQ_{7}	—	March 25, 2015	Haleakala	Pan-STARRS 1	·	2.8 km	MPC · JPL
785198	2015 JC_{8}	—	April 12, 2015	Haleakala	Pan-STARRS 1	·	1.3 km	MPC · JPL
785199	2015 JG_{8}	—	January 28, 2015	Haleakala	Pan-STARRS 1	·	1.5 km	MPC · JPL
785200	2015 JD_{9}	—	March 25, 2015	Haleakala	Pan-STARRS 1	·	2.1 km	MPC · JPL

== 785201–785300 ==
back to top

Designation			Discovery			Properties		Ref
Permanent	Provisional	Named after	Date	Site	Discoverer(s)	Category	Diam.	Ref
785201	2015 JD_{14}	—	January 15, 2007	Mauna Kea	P. A. Wiegert	·	2.4 km	MPC · JPL
785202	2015 JT_{14}	—	May 11, 2015	Haleakala	Pan-STARRS 1	·	2.1 km	MPC · JPL
785203	2015 JJ_{15}	—	May 13, 2015	Haleakala	Pan-STARRS 1	TIR	1.8 km	MPC · JPL
785204	2015 JL_{15}	—	May 14, 2015	Haleakala	Pan-STARRS 2	EUN	1.1 km	MPC · JPL
785205	2015 JN_{15}	—	May 14, 2015	Haleakala	Pan-STARRS 1	LIX	2.5 km	MPC · JPL
785206	2015 JW_{16}	—	May 11, 2015	Mount Lemmon	Mount Lemmon Survey	·	1.8 km	MPC · JPL
785207	2015 JC_{17}	—	May 15, 2015	Haleakala	Pan-STARRS 1	HYG	2.4 km	MPC · JPL
785208	2015 JD_{18}	—	December 14, 2017	Haleakala	Pan-STARRS 1	EUN	770 m	MPC · JPL
785209	2015 JV_{19}	—	May 12, 2015	Mount Lemmon	Mount Lemmon Survey	·	1.2 km	MPC · JPL
785210	2015 JB_{20}	—	May 13, 2015	Haleakala	Pan-STARRS 1	·	2.3 km	MPC · JPL
785211	2015 JE_{20}	—	May 13, 2015	Mount Lemmon	Mount Lemmon Survey	TIR	1.7 km	MPC · JPL
785212	2015 JZ_{20}	—	May 11, 2015	Mount Lemmon	Mount Lemmon Survey	·	1.9 km	MPC · JPL
785213	2015 JH_{28}	—	May 10, 2015	Mount Lemmon	Mount Lemmon Survey	THM	2.0 km	MPC · JPL
785214	2015 JL_{28}	—	May 14, 2015	Haleakala	Pan-STARRS 1	·	1.9 km	MPC · JPL
785215	2015 KH_{4}	—	January 31, 2015	Haleakala	Pan-STARRS 1	·	1.7 km	MPC · JPL
785216	2015 KL_{7}	—	May 18, 2015	Mount Lemmon	Mount Lemmon Survey	·	2.3 km	MPC · JPL
785217	2015 KJ_{9}	—	May 18, 2015	Haleakala	Pan-STARRS 1	·	2.2 km	MPC · JPL
785218	2015 KE_{10}	—	May 18, 2015	Haleakala	Pan-STARRS 1	·	2.4 km	MPC · JPL
785219	2015 KA_{18}	—	March 28, 2015	Haleakala	Pan-STARRS 1	·	2.4 km	MPC · JPL
785220	2015 KB_{18}	—	May 18, 2015	Haleakala	Pan-STARRS 1	T_{j} (2.98) · EUP	2.6 km	MPC · JPL
785221	2015 KP_{24}	—	January 15, 2007	Mauna Kea	P. A. Wiegert	·	2.4 km	MPC · JPL
785222	2015 KR_{35}	—	February 27, 2015	Haleakala	Pan-STARRS 1	·	2.9 km	MPC · JPL
785223	2015 KF_{41}	—	May 20, 2015	Haleakala	Pan-STARRS 1	·	2.0 km	MPC · JPL
785224	2015 KZ_{42}	—	May 20, 2015	Haleakala	Pan-STARRS 1	·	1.8 km	MPC · JPL
785225	2015 KY_{45}	—	January 28, 2014	Mount Lemmon	Mount Lemmon Survey	EUN	1.0 km	MPC · JPL
785226	2015 KP_{46}	—	January 10, 2014	Mount Lemmon	Mount Lemmon Survey	·	1.9 km	MPC · JPL
785227	2015 KT_{51}	—	November 7, 2012	Haleakala	Pan-STARRS 1	·	2.2 km	MPC · JPL
785228	2015 KF_{58}	—	May 10, 2015	Mount Lemmon	Mount Lemmon Survey	·	1.9 km	MPC · JPL
785229	2015 KB_{59}	—	April 24, 2015	Haleakala	Pan-STARRS 2	·	1.9 km	MPC · JPL
785230	2015 KV_{59}	—	October 17, 2012	Haleakala	Pan-STARRS 1	·	1.3 km	MPC · JPL
785231	2015 KL_{61}	—	April 18, 2015	Mount Lemmon	Mount Lemmon Survey	·	2.3 km	MPC · JPL
785232	2015 KC_{64}	—	May 21, 2015	Haleakala	Pan-STARRS 1	·	2.0 km	MPC · JPL
785233	2015 KH_{65}	—	February 16, 2013	Mount Lemmon	Mount Lemmon Survey	L4	5.9 km	MPC · JPL
785234	2015 KQ_{70}	—	May 21, 2015	Haleakala	Pan-STARRS 1	·	2.4 km	MPC · JPL
785235	2015 KE_{72}	—	May 21, 2015	Haleakala	Pan-STARRS 1	·	2.8 km	MPC · JPL
785236	2015 KT_{74}	—	April 25, 2015	Haleakala	Pan-STARRS 1	·	740 m	MPC · JPL
785237	2015 KA_{76}	—	April 25, 2015	Haleakala	Pan-STARRS 1	·	1.9 km	MPC · JPL
785238	2015 KM_{76}	—	December 11, 2013	Haleakala	Pan-STARRS 1	·	1.5 km	MPC · JPL
785239	2015 KH_{84}	—	May 21, 2015	Haleakala	Pan-STARRS 1	EOS	1.4 km	MPC · JPL
785240	2015 KP_{85}	—	May 21, 2015	Haleakala	Pan-STARRS 1	·	2.1 km	MPC · JPL
785241	2015 KQ_{85}	—	May 11, 2015	Mount Lemmon	Mount Lemmon Survey	·	2.2 km	MPC · JPL
785242	2015 KM_{88}	—	August 31, 2011	Haleakala	Pan-STARRS 1	·	2.6 km	MPC · JPL
785243	2015 KR_{88}	—	May 21, 2015	Haleakala	Pan-STARRS 1	·	2.2 km	MPC · JPL
785244	2015 KW_{90}	—	May 21, 2015	Haleakala	Pan-STARRS 1	·	2.4 km	MPC · JPL
785245	2015 KP_{92}	—	May 13, 2015	Mount Lemmon	Mount Lemmon Survey	·	2.2 km	MPC · JPL
785246	2015 KJ_{96}	—	May 21, 2015	Haleakala	Pan-STARRS 1	EOS	1.2 km	MPC · JPL
785247	2015 KV_{99}	—	May 21, 2015	Haleakala	Pan-STARRS 1	EOS	1.3 km	MPC · JPL
785248	2015 KX_{107}	—	May 21, 2015	Haleakala	Pan-STARRS 1	·	870 m	MPC · JPL
785249	2015 KT_{112}	—	October 23, 2011	Mount Lemmon	Mount Lemmon Survey	·	2.1 km	MPC · JPL
785250	2015 KJ_{113}	—	May 21, 2015	Haleakala	Pan-STARRS 1	·	2.4 km	MPC · JPL
785251	2015 KR_{114}	—	May 21, 2015	Haleakala	Pan-STARRS 1	·	1.8 km	MPC · JPL
785252	2015 KN_{138}	—	April 21, 2009	Mount Lemmon	Mount Lemmon Survey	THM	1.8 km	MPC · JPL
785253	2015 KE_{140}	—	March 2, 2009	Kitt Peak	Spacewatch	THM	1.7 km	MPC · JPL
785254	2015 KM_{142}	—	May 10, 2015	Cerro Paranal	Gaia Ground Based Optical Tracking	·	2.2 km	MPC · JPL
785255	2015 KO_{145}	—	May 24, 2015	Haleakala	Pan-STARRS 1	·	2.0 km	MPC · JPL
785256	2015 KG_{146}	—	May 12, 2015	Mount Lemmon	Mount Lemmon Survey	THM	1.8 km	MPC · JPL
785257	2015 KF_{147}	—	May 24, 2015	Haleakala	Pan-STARRS 1	URS	2.0 km	MPC · JPL
785258	2015 KP_{155}	—	January 11, 2008	Kitt Peak	Spacewatch	·	2.4 km	MPC · JPL
785259	2015 KB_{159}	—	May 26, 2015	Haleakala	Pan-STARRS 1	EOS	1.5 km	MPC · JPL
785260	2015 KJ_{167}	—	May 30, 2015	Haleakala	Pan-STARRS 1	BRA	1.3 km	MPC · JPL
785261	2015 KT_{169}	—	December 1, 2005	Kitt Peak	Spacewatch	·	850 m	MPC · JPL
785262	2015 KS_{170}	—	May 21, 2015	Haleakala	Pan-STARRS 1	(5)	960 m	MPC · JPL
785263	2015 KR_{172}	—	May 21, 2015	Haleakala	Pan-STARRS 1	·	1.7 km	MPC · JPL
785264	2015 KB_{180}	—	May 19, 2015	Haleakala	Pan-STARRS 1	·	1.8 km	MPC · JPL
785265	2015 KV_{187}	—	May 20, 2015	Haleakala	Pan-STARRS 1	·	1.4 km	MPC · JPL
785266	2015 KF_{188}	—	May 20, 2015	Mount Lemmon	Mount Lemmon Survey	·	1.8 km	MPC · JPL
785267	2015 KO_{188}	—	May 21, 2015	Haleakala	Pan-STARRS 1	HYG	1.8 km	MPC · JPL
785268	2015 KW_{188}	—	May 22, 2015	Haleakala	Pan-STARRS 1	·	2.1 km	MPC · JPL
785269	2015 KD_{189}	—	May 22, 2015	Haleakala	Pan-STARRS 1	·	1.8 km	MPC · JPL
785270	2015 KK_{189}	—	May 27, 2015	Kitt Peak	Spacewatch	·	2.4 km	MPC · JPL
785271	2015 KQ_{189}	—	May 21, 2015	Haleakala	Pan-STARRS 1	·	1.4 km	MPC · JPL
785272	2015 KU_{189}	—	May 21, 2015	Haleakala	Pan-STARRS 1	·	1.7 km	MPC · JPL
785273	2015 KW_{189}	—	May 22, 2015	Haleakala	Pan-STARRS 2	·	2.2 km	MPC · JPL
785274	2015 KV_{191}	—	May 24, 2015	Haleakala	Pan-STARRS 1	·	1.2 km	MPC · JPL
785275	2015 KW_{191}	—	May 21, 2015	Haleakala	Pan-STARRS 1	·	1.1 km	MPC · JPL
785276	2015 KW_{192}	—	May 18, 2015	Mount Lemmon	Mount Lemmon Survey	·	1.8 km	MPC · JPL
785277	2015 KS_{193}	—	May 18, 2015	Haleakala	Pan-STARRS 1	·	1.3 km	MPC · JPL
785278	2015 KU_{193}	—	May 21, 2015	Haleakala	Pan-STARRS 1	·	2.3 km	MPC · JPL
785279	2015 KZ_{193}	—	May 25, 2015	Haleakala	Pan-STARRS 1	·	1.7 km	MPC · JPL
785280	2015 KT_{197}	—	May 26, 2015	Haleakala	Pan-STARRS 1	·	930 m	MPC · JPL
785281	2015 KZ_{198}	—	May 21, 2015	Haleakala	Pan-STARRS 1	·	720 m	MPC · JPL
785282	2015 KT_{201}	—	May 20, 2015	Haleakala	Pan-STARRS 1	·	1.8 km	MPC · JPL
785283	2015 KV_{201}	—	May 21, 2015	Haleakala	Pan-STARRS 1	L4	6.7 km	MPC · JPL
785284	2015 KA_{203}	—	May 18, 2015	Haleakala	Pan-STARRS 1	EOS	1.3 km	MPC · JPL
785285	2015 KZ_{203}	—	May 20, 2015	Mount Lemmon	Mount Lemmon Survey	·	2.2 km	MPC · JPL
785286	2015 KC_{207}	—	May 21, 2015	Haleakala	Pan-STARRS 1	L4	6.0 km	MPC · JPL
785287	2015 KG_{210}	—	June 11, 2015	Haleakala	Pan-STARRS 1	·	2.4 km	MPC · JPL
785288	2015 KW_{210}	—	May 26, 2015	Haleakala	Pan-STARRS 1	EOS	1.5 km	MPC · JPL
785289	2015 KU_{211}	—	July 7, 2016	Haleakala	Pan-STARRS 1	EOS	1.4 km	MPC · JPL
785290	2015 KE_{215}	—	August 2, 2016	Haleakala	Pan-STARRS 1	·	2.1 km	MPC · JPL
785291	2015 KG_{216}	—	May 20, 2015	Cerro Tololo	DECam	L4	5.4 km	MPC · JPL
785292	2015 KY_{216}	—	August 9, 2016	Haleakala	Pan-STARRS 1	·	2.2 km	MPC · JPL
785293	2015 KP_{224}	—	May 20, 2015	Cerro Tololo	DECam	·	2.0 km	MPC · JPL
785294	2015 KS_{227}	—	May 20, 2015	Cerro Tololo	DECam	·	1.4 km	MPC · JPL
785295	2015 KT_{228}	—	December 16, 2007	Mount Lemmon	Mount Lemmon Survey	·	2.0 km	MPC · JPL
785296	2015 KH_{239}	—	May 18, 2015	Haleakala	Pan-STARRS 1	·	2.3 km	MPC · JPL
785297	2015 KM_{241}	—	May 18, 2015	Haleakala	Pan-STARRS 1	·	1.9 km	MPC · JPL
785298	2015 KE_{251}	—	May 20, 2015	Cerro Tololo	DECam	·	840 m	MPC · JPL
785299	2015 KX_{253}	—	May 20, 2015	Cerro Tololo	DECam	·	2.0 km	MPC · JPL
785300	2015 KR_{255}	—	May 20, 2015	Cerro Tololo	DECam	·	680 m	MPC · JPL

== 785301–785400 ==
back to top

Designation			Discovery			Properties		Ref
Permanent	Provisional	Named after	Date	Site	Discoverer(s)	Category	Diam.	Ref
785301	2015 KA_{260}	—	May 21, 2015	Cerro Tololo	DECam	L4	5.7 km	MPC · JPL
785302	2015 KX_{277}	—	May 20, 2015	Cerro Tololo	DECam	VER	1.8 km	MPC · JPL
785303	2015 KT_{278}	—	May 20, 2015	Cerro Tololo	DECam	·	1.8 km	MPC · JPL
785304	2015 KY_{291}	—	May 21, 2015	Cerro Tololo	DECam	·	2.3 km	MPC · JPL
785305	2015 KL_{302}	—	May 20, 2015	Cerro Tololo	DECam	·	650 m	MPC · JPL
785306	2015 KE_{314}	—	August 9, 2016	Haleakala	Pan-STARRS 1	·	2.2 km	MPC · JPL
785307	2015 KX_{321}	—	May 20, 2015	Cerro Tololo	DECam	·	1.7 km	MPC · JPL
785308	2015 KA_{322}	—	May 19, 2015	Cerro Tololo	DECam	EOS	1.3 km	MPC · JPL
785309	2015 KG_{322}	—	May 20, 2015	Cerro Tololo	DECam	·	1.8 km	MPC · JPL
785310	2015 KA_{323}	—	August 8, 2016	Haleakala	Pan-STARRS 1	·	1.9 km	MPC · JPL
785311	2015 KD_{323}	—	May 21, 2015	Haleakala	Pan-STARRS 1	·	2.1 km	MPC · JPL
785312	2015 KF_{323}	—	May 25, 2015	Haleakala	Pan-STARRS 1	·	2.7 km	MPC · JPL
785313	2015 KH_{323}	—	May 21, 2015	Cerro Tololo	DECam	·	1.5 km	MPC · JPL
785314	2015 KY_{323}	—	May 19, 2015	Cerro Tololo	DECam	·	2.0 km	MPC · JPL
785315	2015 KJ_{324}	—	June 18, 2015	Haleakala	Pan-STARRS 1	·	1.9 km	MPC · JPL
785316	2015 KR_{325}	—	May 22, 2015	Haleakala	Pan-STARRS 1	EOS	1.4 km	MPC · JPL
785317	2015 KH_{326}	—	February 1, 2009	Kitt Peak	Spacewatch	·	1.3 km	MPC · JPL
785318	2015 KR_{331}	—	May 20, 2015	Cerro Tololo	DECam	L4	5.5 km	MPC · JPL
785319	2015 KR_{338}	—	May 20, 2015	Cerro Tololo	DECam	THM	1.7 km	MPC · JPL
785320	2015 KH_{341}	—	May 20, 2015	Cerro Tololo	DECam	·	660 m	MPC · JPL
785321	2015 KR_{346}	—	January 28, 2014	Mount Lemmon	Mount Lemmon Survey	·	2.0 km	MPC · JPL
785322	2015 KW_{359}	—	May 22, 2015	Cerro Tololo	DECam	·	1.2 km	MPC · JPL
785323	2015 KD_{361}	—	May 25, 2015	Mount Lemmon	Mount Lemmon Survey	·	890 m	MPC · JPL
785324	2015 KG_{364}	—	May 20, 2015	Cerro Tololo	DECam	·	2.2 km	MPC · JPL
785325	2015 KU_{364}	—	May 21, 2015	Cerro Tololo	DECam	·	1.9 km	MPC · JPL
785326	2015 KD_{365}	—	May 22, 2015	Cerro Tololo	DECam	·	1.8 km	MPC · JPL
785327	2015 KJ_{366}	—	May 20, 2015	Cerro Tololo	DECam	·	2.4 km	MPC · JPL
785328	2015 KD_{367}	—	May 20, 2015	Cerro Tololo	DECam	THM	1.5 km	MPC · JPL
785329	2015 KY_{367}	—	May 20, 2015	Cerro Tololo	DECam	·	2.6 km	MPC · JPL
785330	2015 KH_{368}	—	May 20, 2015	Cerro Tololo	DECam	·	2.1 km	MPC · JPL
785331	2015 KM_{368}	—	May 20, 2015	Cerro Tololo	DECam	THM	1.4 km	MPC · JPL
785332	2015 KN_{368}	—	May 20, 2015	Cerro Tololo	DECam	·	2.1 km	MPC · JPL
785333	2015 KO_{368}	—	May 20, 2015	Cerro Tololo	DECam	·	1.8 km	MPC · JPL
785334	2015 KT_{368}	—	May 21, 2015	Cerro Tololo	DECam	·	2.1 km	MPC · JPL
785335	2015 KV_{368}	—	May 19, 2015	Cerro Tololo	DECam	VER	1.8 km	MPC · JPL
785336	2015 KL_{369}	—	May 20, 2015	Cerro Tololo	DECam	·	1.9 km	MPC · JPL
785337	2015 KG_{370}	—	January 16, 2008	Mount Lemmon	Mount Lemmon Survey	HYG	1.7 km	MPC · JPL
785338	2015 KL_{372}	—	May 20, 2015	Cerro Tololo	DECam	·	1.9 km	MPC · JPL
785339	2015 KS_{396}	—	May 21, 2015	Cerro Tololo	DECam	·	1.6 km	MPC · JPL
785340	2015 KF_{405}	—	March 5, 2013	Haleakala	Pan-STARRS 1	L4	6.1 km	MPC · JPL
785341	2015 KM_{455}	—	May 23, 2015	Cerro Tololo	DECam	·	1.8 km	MPC · JPL
785342	2015 LX_{9}	—	May 20, 2015	Mount Lemmon	Mount Lemmon Survey	EUP	2.7 km	MPC · JPL
785343	2015 LH_{18}	—	June 11, 2015	Haleakala	Pan-STARRS 1	·	1.1 km	MPC · JPL
785344	2015 LR_{19}	—	June 11, 2015	Haleakala	Pan-STARRS 1	·	970 m	MPC · JPL
785345	2015 LR_{29}	—	June 13, 2015	Haleakala	Pan-STARRS 1	·	2.0 km	MPC · JPL
785346	2015 LN_{30}	—	June 13, 2015	Haleakala	Pan-STARRS 1	JUN	660 m	MPC · JPL
785347	2015 LX_{37}	—	May 21, 2015	Haleakala	Pan-STARRS 1	·	2.2 km	MPC · JPL
785348	2015 LT_{42}	—	May 4, 2014	Haleakala	Pan-STARRS 1	·	2.1 km	MPC · JPL
785349	2015 LD_{44}	—	June 11, 2015	Haleakala	Pan-STARRS 1	·	2.0 km	MPC · JPL
785350	2015 LG_{44}	—	June 11, 2015	Haleakala	Pan-STARRS 1	·	1.8 km	MPC · JPL
785351	2015 LR_{44}	—	January 30, 2008	Mount Lemmon	Mount Lemmon Survey	·	1.7 km	MPC · JPL
785352	2015 LX_{49}	—	June 13, 2015	Haleakala	Pan-STARRS 1	·	2.1 km	MPC · JPL
785353	2015 LX_{50}	—	August 22, 2004	Kitt Peak	Spacewatch	·	2.2 km	MPC · JPL
785354	2015 LU_{51}	—	June 12, 2015	Mount Lemmon	Mount Lemmon Survey	·	1.7 km	MPC · JPL
785355	2015 LL_{52}	—	June 11, 2015	Haleakala	Pan-STARRS 1	WIT	680 m	MPC · JPL
785356	2015 LV_{53}	—	June 15, 2015	Haleakala	Pan-STARRS 1	·	2.3 km	MPC · JPL
785357	2015 LC_{55}	—	June 11, 2015	Haleakala	Pan-STARRS 1	·	990 m	MPC · JPL
785358	2015 LL_{55}	—	June 12, 2015	Haleakala	Pan-STARRS 1	·	1.1 km	MPC · JPL
785359	2015 LJ_{56}	—	June 13, 2015	Haleakala	Pan-STARRS 1	EOS	1.2 km	MPC · JPL
785360	2015 LW_{56}	—	June 15, 2015	Haleakala	Pan-STARRS 1	·	1.9 km	MPC · JPL
785361	2015 LH_{59}	—	June 12, 2015	Mount Lemmon	Mount Lemmon Survey	·	2.3 km	MPC · JPL
785362	2015 LN_{61}	—	August 11, 2016	Haleakala	Pan-STARRS 1	·	2.1 km	MPC · JPL
785363	2015 LX_{64}	—	June 11, 2015	Haleakala	Pan-STARRS 1	·	730 m	MPC · JPL
785364	2015 MU_{10}	—	May 4, 2009	Mount Lemmon	Mount Lemmon Survey	·	2.2 km	MPC · JPL
785365	2015 MW_{15}	—	May 15, 2015	Haleakala	Pan-STARRS 1	·	2.5 km	MPC · JPL
785366	2015 MH_{16}	—	January 31, 2014	Haleakala	Pan-STARRS 1	·	2.5 km	MPC · JPL
785367	2015 MX_{16}	—	April 18, 2015	Haleakala	Pan-STARRS 1	EOS	1.4 km	MPC · JPL
785368	2015 MU_{19}	—	June 18, 2015	Haleakala	Pan-STARRS 1	·	2.7 km	MPC · JPL
785369	2015 MQ_{21}	—	October 22, 2011	Mount Lemmon	Mount Lemmon Survey	·	2.2 km	MPC · JPL
785370	2015 MW_{26}	—	June 11, 2015	Haleakala	Pan-STARRS 1	·	2.3 km	MPC · JPL
785371	2015 MP_{30}	—	May 22, 2015	Haleakala	Pan-STARRS 1	EOS	1.4 km	MPC · JPL
785372	2015 MK_{33}	—	January 23, 2014	Mount Lemmon	Mount Lemmon Survey	·	2.1 km	MPC · JPL
785373	2015 MA_{34}	—	May 22, 2015	Haleakala	Pan-STARRS 1	EOS	1.3 km	MPC · JPL
785374	2015 MG_{36}	—	March 31, 2015	Haleakala	Pan-STARRS 1	EUN	880 m	MPC · JPL
785375	2015 MA_{37}	—	August 30, 2005	Kitt Peak	Spacewatch	·	2.1 km	MPC · JPL
785376	2015 MF_{37}	—	June 18, 2015	Haleakala	Pan-STARRS 1	EOS	1.2 km	MPC · JPL
785377	2015 MS_{39}	—	May 19, 2015	Haleakala	Pan-STARRS 1	·	2.1 km	MPC · JPL
785378	2015 MJ_{41}	—	March 28, 2015	Haleakala	Pan-STARRS 1	·	2.1 km	MPC · JPL
785379	2015 MN_{41}	—	June 18, 2015	Haleakala	Pan-STARRS 1	EOS	1.4 km	MPC · JPL
785380	2015 MO_{41}	—	May 21, 2015	Haleakala	Pan-STARRS 1	EOS	1.4 km	MPC · JPL
785381	2015 MU_{42}	—	January 26, 2014	Haleakala	Pan-STARRS 1	·	1.6 km	MPC · JPL
785382	2015 MQ_{82}	—	June 22, 2015	Haleakala	Pan-STARRS 1	·	2.4 km	MPC · JPL
785383	2015 MR_{88}	—	June 22, 2015	Haleakala	Pan-STARRS 1	HYG	1.8 km	MPC · JPL
785384	2015 MW_{106}	—	June 26, 2015	Haleakala	Pan-STARRS 1	·	1.1 km	MPC · JPL
785385	2015 MN_{112}	—	June 26, 2015	Haleakala	Pan-STARRS 1	·	2.6 km	MPC · JPL
785386	2015 MW_{117}	—	June 27, 2015	Haleakala	Pan-STARRS 2	·	2.2 km	MPC · JPL
785387	2015 MC_{119}	—	June 27, 2015	Haleakala	Pan-STARRS 1	EUN	900 m	MPC · JPL
785388	2015 ML_{119}	—	June 27, 2015	Haleakala	Pan-STARRS 1	·	1.0 km	MPC · JPL
785389	2015 ME_{122}	—	June 27, 2015	Haleakala	Pan-STARRS 1	·	2.8 km	MPC · JPL
785390	2015 MV_{132}	—	April 22, 2009	Kitt Peak	Spacewatch	·	1.7 km	MPC · JPL
785391	2015 MY_{135}	—	October 28, 2006	Kitt Peak	Spacewatch	·	1.5 km	MPC · JPL
785392	2015 MU_{136}	—	June 26, 2015	Haleakala	Pan-STARRS 1	·	1.3 km	MPC · JPL
785393	2015 MY_{137}	—	June 26, 2015	Haleakala	Pan-STARRS 1	·	2.1 km	MPC · JPL
785394	2015 MU_{138}	—	June 20, 2015	Haleakala	Pan-STARRS 1	·	1.1 km	MPC · JPL
785395	2015 MG_{140}	—	June 17, 2015	Haleakala	Pan-STARRS 1	EUN	800 m	MPC · JPL
785396	2015 MK_{146}	—	June 26, 2015	Haleakala	Pan-STARRS 1	·	2.3 km	MPC · JPL
785397	2015 ML_{146}	—	June 26, 2015	Haleakala	Pan-STARRS 1	·	2.0 km	MPC · JPL
785398	2015 MV_{146}	—	June 26, 2015	Haleakala	Pan-STARRS 1	MIS	1.7 km	MPC · JPL
785399	2015 MT_{147}	—	May 8, 2014	Haleakala	Pan-STARRS 1	EOS	1.3 km	MPC · JPL
785400	2015 MY_{147}	—	June 27, 2015	Haleakala	Pan-STARRS 1	·	1.6 km	MPC · JPL

== 785401–785500 ==
back to top

Designation			Discovery			Properties		Ref
Permanent	Provisional	Named after	Date	Site	Discoverer(s)	Category	Diam.	Ref
785401	2015 MU_{149}	—	June 29, 2015	Haleakala	Pan-STARRS 1	·	1.0 km	MPC · JPL
785402	2015 MV_{149}	—	April 6, 2014	Mount Lemmon	Mount Lemmon Survey	·	2.0 km	MPC · JPL
785403	2015 MS_{150}	—	October 7, 2016	Haleakala	Pan-STARRS 1	·	1.7 km	MPC · JPL
785404	2015 MW_{151}	—	June 17, 2015	Haleakala	Pan-STARRS 1	·	1.1 km	MPC · JPL
785405	2015 MU_{152}	—	June 24, 2015	Haleakala	Pan-STARRS 1	JUN	710 m	MPC · JPL
785406	2015 MX_{156}	—	June 19, 2015	Mount Lemmon	Mount Lemmon Survey	EUP	3.4 km	MPC · JPL
785407	2015 MD_{160}	—	June 26, 2015	Haleakala	Pan-STARRS 1	·	2.1 km	MPC · JPL
785408	2015 MF_{161}	—	June 26, 2015	Haleakala	Pan-STARRS 1	·	2.0 km	MPC · JPL
785409	2015 MG_{163}	—	June 26, 2015	Haleakala	Pan-STARRS 1	THB	2.2 km	MPC · JPL
785410	2015 MU_{163}	—	June 18, 2015	Haleakala	Pan-STARRS 1	EUN	1.0 km	MPC · JPL
785411	2015 MH_{164}	—	June 17, 2015	Haleakala	Pan-STARRS 1	·	2.3 km	MPC · JPL
785412	2015 MP_{164}	—	June 17, 2015	Haleakala	Pan-STARRS 1	·	1.0 km	MPC · JPL
785413	2015 MX_{164}	—	June 18, 2015	Haleakala	Pan-STARRS 1	THB	1.9 km	MPC · JPL
785414	2015 MF_{165}	—	June 23, 2015	Haleakala	Pan-STARRS 1	EOS	1.5 km	MPC · JPL
785415	2015 MM_{168}	—	June 26, 2015	Haleakala	Pan-STARRS 1	·	2.7 km	MPC · JPL
785416	2015 MR_{172}	—	June 26, 2015	Haleakala	Pan-STARRS 1	·	1.1 km	MPC · JPL
785417	2015 MK_{176}	—	June 26, 2015	Haleakala	Pan-STARRS 1	·	870 m	MPC · JPL
785418	2015 MY_{176}	—	June 26, 2015	Haleakala	Pan-STARRS 1	3:2	4.1 km	MPC · JPL
785419	2015 MR_{182}	—	June 27, 2015	Haleakala	Pan-STARRS 1	·	2.7 km	MPC · JPL
785420	2015 MY_{183}	—	June 27, 2015	Haleakala	Pan-STARRS 1	·	2.1 km	MPC · JPL
785421	2015 ME_{188}	—	January 17, 2013	Haleakala	Pan-STARRS 1	EOS	1.4 km	MPC · JPL
785422	2015 MB_{192}	—	June 27, 2015	Haleakala	Pan-STARRS 1	·	1.1 km	MPC · JPL
785423	2015 MO_{194}	—	April 23, 2014	Cerro Tololo	DECam	·	1.2 km	MPC · JPL
785424	2015 ML_{196}	—	June 18, 2015	Haleakala	Pan-STARRS 1	VER	1.9 km	MPC · JPL
785425	2015 MV_{202}	—	June 26, 2015	Haleakala	Pan-STARRS 1	·	2.3 km	MPC · JPL
785426	2015 MR_{203}	—	June 18, 2015	Mount Lemmon	Mount Lemmon Survey	·	1.3 km	MPC · JPL
785427	2015 MZ_{203}	—	June 26, 2015	Haleakala	Pan-STARRS 1	·	870 m	MPC · JPL
785428	2015 NY	—	April 20, 2015	Haleakala	Pan-STARRS 1	·	2.4 km	MPC · JPL
785429	2015 ND_{4}	—	April 25, 2015	Haleakala	Pan-STARRS 1	·	1.7 km	MPC · JPL
785430	2015 NS_{5}	—	June 11, 2015	Haleakala	Pan-STARRS 1	·	1.3 km	MPC · JPL
785431	2015 NP_{7}	—	October 8, 1999	Kitt Peak	Spacewatch	·	910 m	MPC · JPL
785432	2015 NF_{12}	—	May 25, 2015	Haleakala	Pan-STARRS 1	·	780 m	MPC · JPL
785433	2015 NK_{17}	—	October 10, 2007	Lulin	LUSS	·	810 m	MPC · JPL
785434	2015 NM_{25}	—	June 8, 2011	Haleakala	Pan-STARRS 1	BAR	1.0 km	MPC · JPL
785435	2015 NL_{26}	—	July 12, 2015	Haleakala	Pan-STARRS 1	·	1.7 km	MPC · JPL
785436	2015 NR_{32}	—	October 23, 2011	Haleakala	Pan-STARRS 1	·	1.4 km	MPC · JPL
785437	2015 NC_{35}	—	July 9, 2015	Haleakala	Pan-STARRS 1	·	720 m	MPC · JPL
785438	2015 NN_{39}	—	July 12, 2015	Kitt Peak	Spacewatch	·	2.0 km	MPC · JPL
785439	2015 NR_{42}	—	August 11, 2007	Siding Spring	SSS	·	1.1 km	MPC · JPL
785440	2015 OH_{6}	—	June 27, 2015	Haleakala	Pan-STARRS 1	MAR	840 m	MPC · JPL
785441	2015 OV_{8}	—	June 17, 2015	Haleakala	Pan-STARRS 1	·	2.4 km	MPC · JPL
785442	2015 OD_{11}	—	July 18, 2015	Haleakala	Pan-STARRS 1	·	890 m	MPC · JPL
785443	2015 OP_{11}	—	July 18, 2015	Haleakala	Pan-STARRS 1	THM	1.8 km	MPC · JPL
785444	2015 OM_{15}	—	February 1, 2001	Kitt Peak	Spacewatch	HNS	820 m	MPC · JPL
785445	2015 OT_{18}	—	July 27, 2011	Haleakala	Pan-STARRS 1	·	840 m	MPC · JPL
785446	2015 OW_{20}	—	July 18, 2015	Haleakala	Pan-STARRS 1	MAR	950 m	MPC · JPL
785447	2015 OF_{25}	—	June 19, 2015	Catalina	CSS	T_{j} (2.96)	3.8 km	MPC · JPL
785448	2015 OB_{27}	—	June 15, 2015	Haleakala	Pan-STARRS 1	·	3.0 km	MPC · JPL
785449	2015 OY_{32}	—	July 23, 2015	Haleakala	Pan-STARRS 2	·	1.3 km	MPC · JPL
785450	2015 OF_{33}	—	September 18, 1998	Kitt Peak	Spacewatch	·	1.3 km	MPC · JPL
785451	2015 OJ_{34}	—	July 24, 2015	Haleakala	Pan-STARRS 1	·	2.1 km	MPC · JPL
785452	2015 ON_{49}	—	July 26, 2015	Haleakala	Pan-STARRS 1	·	2.6 km	MPC · JPL
785453	2015 OR_{49}	—	September 21, 2011	Haleakala	Pan-STARRS 1	ADE	1.6 km	MPC · JPL
785454	2015 OK_{51}	—	July 26, 2015	Haleakala	Pan-STARRS 1	·	860 m	MPC · JPL
785455	2015 OQ_{52}	—	February 16, 2010	Mount Lemmon	Mount Lemmon Survey	·	880 m	MPC · JPL
785456	2015 OT_{54}	—	June 17, 2015	Haleakala	Pan-STARRS 1	·	2.1 km	MPC · JPL
785457	2015 OM_{55}	—	July 26, 2015	Haleakala	Pan-STARRS 1	·	1.2 km	MPC · JPL
785458	2015 OY_{56}	—	July 26, 2015	Haleakala	Pan-STARRS 1	ADE	1.4 km	MPC · JPL
785459	2015 OQ_{58}	—	September 14, 2007	Kitt Peak	Spacewatch	MAR	760 m	MPC · JPL
785460	2015 OU_{67}	—	September 15, 2007	Kitt Peak	Spacewatch	(5)	840 m	MPC · JPL
785461	2015 OX_{69}	—	July 27, 2015	Haleakala	Pan-STARRS 1	·	770 m	MPC · JPL
785462	2015 OZ_{81}	—	July 19, 2015	Haleakala	Pan-STARRS 2	·	2.3 km	MPC · JPL
785463	2015 OM_{89}	—	February 3, 2013	Haleakala	Pan-STARRS 1	·	1.2 km	MPC · JPL
785464	2015 OQ_{90}	—	July 18, 2015	Haleakala	Pan-STARRS 1	·	750 m	MPC · JPL
785465	2015 OR_{90}	—	July 19, 2015	Haleakala	Pan-STARRS 1	·	1.0 km	MPC · JPL
785466	2015 OC_{91}	—	September 30, 2003	Kitt Peak	Spacewatch	(5)	760 m	MPC · JPL
785467	2015 OQ_{93}	—	July 19, 2015	Haleakala	Pan-STARRS 2	·	2.2 km	MPC · JPL
785468	2015 OG_{97}	—	September 12, 2001	Kitt Peak	Deep Ecliptic Survey	KOR	870 m	MPC · JPL
785469	2015 OO_{97}	—	July 24, 2015	Haleakala	Pan-STARRS 1	·	2.4 km	MPC · JPL
785470	2015 OB_{99}	—	September 26, 2011	Mount Lemmon	Mount Lemmon Survey	·	890 m	MPC · JPL
785471	2015 OO_{106}	—	July 25, 2015	Haleakala	Pan-STARRS 1	·	940 m	MPC · JPL
785472	2015 OK_{114}	—	July 25, 2015	Haleakala	Pan-STARRS 1	·	850 m	MPC · JPL
785473	2015 OY_{114}	—	July 25, 2015	Haleakala	Pan-STARRS 1	·	1 km	MPC · JPL
785474	2015 OF_{120}	—	July 25, 2015	Haleakala	Pan-STARRS 1	·	1.3 km	MPC · JPL
785475	2015 ON_{125}	—	July 28, 2015	Haleakala	Pan-STARRS 1	·	2.8 km	MPC · JPL
785476	2015 OQ_{129}	—	July 24, 2015	Haleakala	Pan-STARRS 1	·	2.3 km	MPC · JPL
785477	2015 OR_{129}	—	July 24, 2015	Haleakala	Pan-STARRS 1	·	2.3 km	MPC · JPL
785478	2015 OR_{131}	—	July 19, 2015	Haleakala	Pan-STARRS 1	BRA	1.3 km	MPC · JPL
785479	2015 OM_{133}	—	July 19, 2015	Haleakala	Pan-STARRS 1	AGN	790 m	MPC · JPL
785480	2015 OE_{134}	—	July 19, 2015	Haleakala	Pan-STARRS 1	·	1.4 km	MPC · JPL
785481	2015 OU_{138}	—	July 19, 2015	Haleakala	Pan-STARRS 1	·	900 m	MPC · JPL
785482	2015 OW_{138}	—	July 23, 2015	Haleakala	Pan-STARRS 1	·	1.3 km	MPC · JPL
785483	2015 OG_{139}	—	July 19, 2015	Haleakala	Pan-STARRS 1	·	900 m	MPC · JPL
785484	2015 OX_{139}	—	July 24, 2015	Haleakala	Pan-STARRS 1	·	1.1 km	MPC · JPL
785485	2015 OH_{149}	—	July 24, 2015	Haleakala	Pan-STARRS 1	·	2.6 km	MPC · JPL
785486	2015 OE_{150}	—	July 19, 2015	Haleakala	Pan-STARRS 1	KOR	920 m	MPC · JPL
785487	2015 OO_{154}	—	July 24, 2015	Haleakala	Pan-STARRS 1	·	2.6 km	MPC · JPL
785488	2015 OT_{154}	—	July 25, 2015	Haleakala	Pan-STARRS 1	·	2.4 km	MPC · JPL
785489	2015 OE_{157}	—	July 19, 2015	Haleakala	Pan-STARRS 1	EOS	1.4 km	MPC · JPL
785490	2015 OV_{157}	—	July 24, 2015	Haleakala	Pan-STARRS 1	·	2.0 km	MPC · JPL
785491	2015 OY_{159}	—	July 24, 2015	Haleakala	Pan-STARRS 1	·	920 m	MPC · JPL
785492	2015 OF_{161}	—	July 24, 2015	Haleakala	Pan-STARRS 1	·	2.2 km	MPC · JPL
785493	2015 OR_{166}	—	July 19, 2015	Haleakala	Pan-STARRS 1	·	1.0 km	MPC · JPL
785494	2015 OU_{169}	—	July 25, 2015	Haleakala	Pan-STARRS 1	·	2.9 km	MPC · JPL
785495	2015 OC_{170}	—	July 24, 2015	Haleakala	Pan-STARRS 1	·	1.0 km	MPC · JPL
785496	2015 OX_{171}	—	July 19, 2015	Haleakala	Pan-STARRS 1	·	920 m	MPC · JPL
785497	2015 OJ_{172}	—	July 28, 2015	Haleakala	Pan-STARRS 1	·	2.2 km	MPC · JPL
785498	2015 OM_{174}	—	December 29, 2011	Mount Lemmon	Mount Lemmon Survey	·	2.8 km	MPC · JPL
785499	2015 PA_{2}	—	July 14, 2015	Haleakala	Pan-STARRS 1	·	2.5 km	MPC · JPL
785500	2015 PA_{3}	—	June 20, 2015	Haleakala	Pan-STARRS 1	·	1.2 km	MPC · JPL

== 785501–785600 ==
back to top

Designation			Discovery			Properties		Ref
Permanent	Provisional	Named after	Date	Site	Discoverer(s)	Category	Diam.	Ref
785501	2015 PA_{5}	—	June 21, 2015	Mount Lemmon	Mount Lemmon Survey	·	1.1 km	MPC · JPL
785502	2015 PL_{6}	—	September 18, 2003	Kitt Peak	Spacewatch	(5)	930 m	MPC · JPL
785503	2015 PV_{7}	—	August 6, 2015	Haleakala	Pan-STARRS 1	·	800 m	MPC · JPL
785504	2015 PB_{8}	—	March 24, 2014	Haleakala	Pan-STARRS 1	·	2.2 km	MPC · JPL
785505	2015 PX_{8}	—	July 27, 2015	Haleakala	Pan-STARRS 1	·	950 m	MPC · JPL
785506	2015 PY_{10}	—	October 26, 2005	Kitt Peak	Spacewatch	·	1.8 km	MPC · JPL
785507	2015 PU_{17}	—	August 8, 2015	Haleakala	Pan-STARRS 1	·	1.2 km	MPC · JPL
785508	2015 PR_{18}	—	November 4, 2007	Mount Lemmon	Mount Lemmon Survey	·	1.2 km	MPC · JPL
785509	2015 PH_{21}	—	February 28, 2014	Haleakala	Pan-STARRS 1	·	2.3 km	MPC · JPL
785510	2015 PC_{30}	—	June 27, 2015	Haleakala	Pan-STARRS 1	·	990 m	MPC · JPL
785511	2015 PS_{36}	—	July 24, 2015	Haleakala	Pan-STARRS 1	·	2.6 km	MPC · JPL
785512	2015 PB_{52}	—	June 17, 2015	Haleakala	Pan-STARRS 1	EUN	910 m	MPC · JPL
785513	2015 PJ_{56}	—	September 23, 2011	Kitt Peak	Spacewatch	MAR	870 m	MPC · JPL
785514	2015 PE_{59}	—	October 2, 2010	Mount Lemmon	Mount Lemmon Survey	·	2.3 km	MPC · JPL
785515	2015 PL_{65}	—	June 22, 2015	Haleakala	Pan-STARRS 1	·	1.0 km	MPC · JPL
785516	2015 PH_{67}	—	July 19, 2015	Haleakala	Pan-STARRS 1	·	1.2 km	MPC · JPL
785517	2015 PE_{70}	—	June 26, 2015	Haleakala	Pan-STARRS 1	THM	1.7 km	MPC · JPL
785518	2015 PD_{71}	—	June 18, 2015	Haleakala	Pan-STARRS 1	·	1.5 km	MPC · JPL
785519	2015 PJ_{72}	—	June 26, 2015	Haleakala	Pan-STARRS 1	·	2.2 km	MPC · JPL
785520	2015 PV_{74}	—	June 23, 2015	Haleakala	Pan-STARRS 1	·	1.0 km	MPC · JPL
785521	2015 PX_{79}	—	July 19, 2015	Haleakala	Pan-STARRS 1	·	690 m	MPC · JPL
785522	2015 PD_{80}	—	April 30, 2014	Mount Lemmon	Mount Lemmon Survey	·	2.2 km	MPC · JPL
785523	2015 PJ_{81}	—	September 26, 2011	Mount Lemmon	Mount Lemmon Survey	·	1.1 km	MPC · JPL
785524	2015 PG_{87}	—	July 19, 2015	Haleakala	Pan-STARRS 1	·	2.4 km	MPC · JPL
785525	2015 PN_{87}	—	June 26, 2015	Haleakala	Pan-STARRS 1	·	2.0 km	MPC · JPL
785526	2015 PN_{89}	—	September 4, 2011	Haleakala	Pan-STARRS 1	·	1.5 km	MPC · JPL
785527	2015 PG_{91}	—	February 26, 2014	Mount Lemmon	Mount Lemmon Survey	·	810 m	MPC · JPL
785528	2015 PQ_{91}	—	August 10, 2015	Haleakala	Pan-STARRS 1	·	870 m	MPC · JPL
785529	2015 PS_{100}	—	December 29, 2008	Kitt Peak	Spacewatch	·	860 m	MPC · JPL
785530	2015 PO_{104}	—	June 22, 2015	Haleakala	Pan-STARRS 1	·	2.9 km	MPC · JPL
785531	2015 PL_{111}	—	April 22, 2014	Mount Lemmon	Mount Lemmon Survey	EOS	1.5 km	MPC · JPL
785532	2015 PH_{113}	—	August 10, 2015	Haleakala	Pan-STARRS 1	EOS	1.3 km	MPC · JPL
785533	2015 PV_{116}	—	July 19, 2015	Haleakala	Pan-STARRS 2	·	2.0 km	MPC · JPL
785534	2015 PU_{117}	—	August 10, 2015	Haleakala	Pan-STARRS 1	·	610 m	MPC · JPL
785535	2015 PC_{118}	—	June 29, 2015	Haleakala	Pan-STARRS 1	·	2.1 km	MPC · JPL
785536	2015 PV_{118}	—	August 10, 2015	Haleakala	Pan-STARRS 1	VER	2.0 km	MPC · JPL
785537	2015 PK_{119}	—	February 27, 2014	Haleakala	Pan-STARRS 1	·	1.2 km	MPC · JPL
785538	2015 PD_{125}	—	August 10, 2015	Haleakala	Pan-STARRS 1	(12739)	1.2 km	MPC · JPL
785539	2015 PM_{129}	—	September 19, 2011	Palomar	Palomar Transient Factory	·	1.0 km	MPC · JPL
785540	2015 PZ_{131}	—	July 12, 2015	Kitt Peak	Spacewatch	·	1.1 km	MPC · JPL
785541	2015 PK_{135}	—	August 10, 2015	Haleakala	Pan-STARRS 1	·	1.3 km	MPC · JPL
785542	2015 PQ_{138}	—	August 10, 2015	Haleakala	Pan-STARRS 1	·	1.4 km	MPC · JPL
785543	2015 PT_{145}	—	September 14, 2010	Kitt Peak	Spacewatch	·	2.2 km	MPC · JPL
785544	2015 PJ_{148}	—	August 10, 2015	Haleakala	Pan-STARRS 1	·	630 m	MPC · JPL
785545	2015 PD_{154}	—	April 4, 2014	Haleakala	Pan-STARRS 1	·	1.4 km	MPC · JPL
785546	2015 PR_{156}	—	August 10, 2015	Haleakala	Pan-STARRS 1	·	930 m	MPC · JPL
785547	2015 PZ_{159}	—	January 29, 2009	Mount Lemmon	Mount Lemmon Survey	EUN	790 m	MPC · JPL
785548	2015 PV_{161}	—	July 24, 2015	Haleakala	Pan-STARRS 1	·	1.3 km	MPC · JPL
785549	2015 PO_{163}	—	July 24, 2015	Haleakala	Pan-STARRS 1	·	1.3 km	MPC · JPL
785550	2015 PV_{167}	—	July 19, 2015	Haleakala	Pan-STARRS 2	·	1.4 km	MPC · JPL
785551	2015 PC_{169}	—	August 10, 2015	Haleakala	Pan-STARRS 1	·	700 m	MPC · JPL
785552	2015 PJ_{176}	—	September 24, 2011	Haleakala	Pan-STARRS 1	·	1.3 km	MPC · JPL
785553	2015 PB_{180}	—	June 17, 2015	Haleakala	Pan-STARRS 1	·	2.2 km	MPC · JPL
785554	2015 PS_{184}	—	September 12, 2007	Kitt Peak	Spacewatch	·	720 m	MPC · JPL
785555	2015 PX_{184}	—	September 15, 2006	Kitt Peak	Spacewatch	·	1.5 km	MPC · JPL
785556	2015 PH_{185}	—	July 24, 2015	Haleakala	Pan-STARRS 1	EOS	1.4 km	MPC · JPL
785557	2015 PK_{185}	—	May 24, 2015	Kitt Peak	Spacewatch	·	640 m	MPC · JPL
785558	2015 PD_{189}	—	August 10, 2015	Haleakala	Pan-STARRS 1	·	710 m	MPC · JPL
785559	2015 PU_{190}	—	August 10, 2015	Haleakala	Pan-STARRS 1	·	1.1 km	MPC · JPL
785560	2015 PH_{192}	—	August 10, 2015	Haleakala	Pan-STARRS 1	·	700 m	MPC · JPL
785561	2015 PM_{193}	—	August 10, 2015	Haleakala	Pan-STARRS 1	·	860 m	MPC · JPL
785562	2015 PW_{194}	—	May 4, 2014	Mount Lemmon	Mount Lemmon Survey	·	2.2 km	MPC · JPL
785563	2015 PG_{195}	—	August 10, 2015	Haleakala	Pan-STARRS 1	EUN	670 m	MPC · JPL
785564	2015 PY_{200}	—	August 10, 2015	Haleakala	Pan-STARRS 1	·	900 m	MPC · JPL
785565	2015 PV_{205}	—	August 10, 2015	Haleakala	Pan-STARRS 1	·	910 m	MPC · JPL
785566	2015 PH_{207}	—	October 26, 2011	Haleakala	Pan-STARRS 1	ADE	1.4 km	MPC · JPL
785567	2015 PP_{211}	—	August 10, 2015	Haleakala	Pan-STARRS 1	·	1.2 km	MPC · JPL
785568	2015 PS_{217}	—	August 10, 2015	Haleakala	Pan-STARRS 1	·	990 m	MPC · JPL
785569	2015 PW_{225}	—	August 10, 2015	Haleakala	Pan-STARRS 1	BRA	1.4 km	MPC · JPL
785570	2015 PY_{228}	—	August 12, 2015	Haleakala	Pan-STARRS 1	·	1.5 km	MPC · JPL
785571	2015 PT_{236}	—	January 20, 2009	Kitt Peak	Spacewatch	·	1.1 km	MPC · JPL
785572	2015 PZ_{236}	—	August 10, 2015	Haleakala	Pan-STARRS 1	·	1.4 km	MPC · JPL
785573	2015 PC_{238}	—	July 25, 2015	Haleakala	Pan-STARRS 1	·	620 m	MPC · JPL
785574	2015 PF_{241}	—	January 17, 2009	Mount Lemmon	Mount Lemmon Survey	·	870 m	MPC · JPL
785575	2015 PX_{244}	—	July 27, 2011	Haleakala	Pan-STARRS 1	·	760 m	MPC · JPL
785576	2015 PN_{245}	—	August 10, 2015	Haleakala	Pan-STARRS 1	·	1.4 km	MPC · JPL
785577	2015 PF_{249}	—	August 10, 2015	Haleakala	Pan-STARRS 1	·	2.3 km	MPC · JPL
785578	2015 PG_{249}	—	April 24, 2014	Haleakala	Pan-STARRS 1	·	1.4 km	MPC · JPL
785579	2015 PP_{249}	—	August 10, 2015	Haleakala	Pan-STARRS 1	·	710 m	MPC · JPL
785580	2015 PM_{251}	—	April 11, 2010	Kitt Peak	Spacewatch	·	1.0 km	MPC · JPL
785581	2015 PU_{253}	—	October 24, 2003	Kitt Peak	Spacewatch	·	990 m	MPC · JPL
785582	2015 PC_{256}	—	August 11, 2015	Haleakala	Pan-STARRS 1	·	1.0 km	MPC · JPL
785583	2015 PF_{256}	—	June 26, 2015	Haleakala	Pan-STARRS 1	·	1.4 km	MPC · JPL
785584	2015 PD_{257}	—	June 26, 2015	Haleakala	Pan-STARRS 1	·	2.0 km	MPC · JPL
785585	2015 PX_{266}	—	July 25, 2015	Haleakala	Pan-STARRS 1	·	2.8 km	MPC · JPL
785586	2015 PM_{267}	—	August 11, 2015	Haleakala	Pan-STARRS 1	·	660 m	MPC · JPL
785587	2015 PN_{270}	—	October 31, 2010	Mount Lemmon	Mount Lemmon Survey	·	2.1 km	MPC · JPL
785588	2015 PX_{270}	—	October 4, 2007	Catalina	CSS	·	790 m	MPC · JPL
785589	2015 PK_{276}	—	July 24, 2015	Haleakala	Pan-STARRS 1	EUN	1.1 km	MPC · JPL
785590	2015 PU_{280}	—	July 24, 2015	Haleakala	Pan-STARRS 1	(5)	680 m	MPC · JPL
785591	2015 PO_{285}	—	August 12, 2015	Haleakala	Pan-STARRS 1	·	1.2 km	MPC · JPL
785592	2015 PC_{295}	—	May 3, 2014	Mount Lemmon	Mount Lemmon Survey	·	1.5 km	MPC · JPL
785593	2015 PQ_{303}	—	January 9, 2006	Kitt Peak	Spacewatch	·	2.4 km	MPC · JPL
785594	2015 PQ_{308}	—	May 27, 2009	Kitt Peak	Spacewatch	·	1.9 km	MPC · JPL
785595	2015 PG_{312}	—	August 11, 2015	iTelescope	Dawson, B. C.	·	2.0 km	MPC · JPL
785596	2015 PA_{315}	—	November 18, 2007	Mount Lemmon	Mount Lemmon Survey	·	890 m	MPC · JPL
785597	2015 PU_{316}	—	August 14, 2015	Haleakala	Pan-STARRS 1	(5)	830 m	MPC · JPL
785598	2015 PY_{317}	—	September 21, 2011	Kitt Peak	Spacewatch	·	1.0 km	MPC · JPL
785599	2015 PP_{318}	—	August 9, 2015	Haleakala	Pan-STARRS 1	·	850 m	MPC · JPL
785600	2015 PT_{319}	—	July 27, 2011	Haleakala	Pan-STARRS 1	·	840 m	MPC · JPL

== 785601–785700 ==
back to top

Designation			Discovery			Properties		Ref
Permanent	Provisional	Named after	Date	Site	Discoverer(s)	Category	Diam.	Ref
785601	2015 PG_{320}	—	October 23, 2011	Haleakala	Pan-STARRS 1	·	910 m	MPC · JPL
785602	2015 PO_{321}	—	August 13, 2015	Kitt Peak	Spacewatch	AST	1.3 km	MPC · JPL
785603	2015 PU_{321}	—	August 13, 2015	Haleakala	Pan-STARRS 1	EUN	700 m	MPC · JPL
785604	2015 PT_{332}	—	August 7, 2015	Haleakala	Pan-STARRS 1	·	1.4 km	MPC · JPL
785605	2015 PJ_{334}	—	August 10, 2015	Haleakala	Pan-STARRS 2	EOS	1.4 km	MPC · JPL
785606	2015 PR_{334}	—	July 19, 2015	Haleakala	Pan-STARRS 1	·	1.3 km	MPC · JPL
785607	2015 PM_{338}	—	August 12, 2015	ESA OGS	ESA OGS	·	2.2 km	MPC · JPL
785608	2015 PS_{339}	—	October 20, 2011	Mount Lemmon	Mount Lemmon Survey	·	1.5 km	MPC · JPL
785609	2015 PV_{340}	—	August 14, 2015	Haleakala	Pan-STARRS 1	(11882)	1.2 km	MPC · JPL
785610	2015 PU_{341}	—	August 14, 2015	Haleakala	Pan-STARRS 1	·	1.3 km	MPC · JPL
785611	2015 PK_{343}	—	August 10, 2015	Haleakala	Pan-STARRS 1	·	1.0 km	MPC · JPL
785612	2015 PY_{344}	—	September 23, 2011	Haleakala	Pan-STARRS 1	·	1.3 km	MPC · JPL
785613	2015 PR_{345}	—	August 10, 2015	Haleakala	Pan-STARRS 1	·	950 m	MPC · JPL
785614	2015 PL_{348}	—	August 8, 2015	Haleakala	Pan-STARRS 2	EOS	1.4 km	MPC · JPL
785615	2015 PF_{362}	—	August 10, 2015	Haleakala	Pan-STARRS 1	·	2.6 km	MPC · JPL
785616	2015 QM_{10}	—	July 12, 2015	Haleakala	Pan-STARRS 1	·	750 m	MPC · JPL
785617	2015 QN_{13}	—	August 20, 2015	Kitt Peak	Spacewatch	(5)	960 m	MPC · JPL
785618	2015 QV_{15}	—	August 20, 2015	Kitt Peak	Spacewatch	·	1.9 km	MPC · JPL
785619	2015 QL_{16}	—	October 19, 2011	Mount Lemmon	Mount Lemmon Survey	·	1.1 km	MPC · JPL
785620	2015 QN_{16}	—	September 11, 2010	Kitt Peak	Spacewatch	·	1.4 km	MPC · JPL
785621	2015 QS_{16}	—	August 21, 2015	Haleakala	Pan-STARRS 1	·	1.3 km	MPC · JPL
785622	2015 QY_{16}	—	August 21, 2015	Haleakala	Pan-STARRS 1	·	1.3 km	MPC · JPL
785623	2015 QA_{18}	—	January 2, 2011	Mount Lemmon	Mount Lemmon Survey	·	2.2 km	MPC · JPL
785624	2015 QZ_{18}	—	July 26, 2014	Haleakala	Pan-STARRS 1	·	2.4 km	MPC · JPL
785625	2015 QC_{22}	—	August 21, 2015	Haleakala	Pan-STARRS 1	·	2.5 km	MPC · JPL
785626	2015 QS_{22}	—	August 21, 2015	Haleakala	Pan-STARRS 1	·	1.2 km	MPC · JPL
785627	2015 QF_{23}	—	August 21, 2015	Haleakala	Pan-STARRS 1	·	870 m	MPC · JPL
785628	2015 QF_{24}	—	August 21, 2015	Haleakala	Pan-STARRS 1	·	2.4 km	MPC · JPL
785629	2015 QP_{24}	—	August 21, 2015	Haleakala	Pan-STARRS 1	·	2.5 km	MPC · JPL
785630 Peterbrandt	2015 QR_{24}	Peterbrandt	August 23, 2015	La Palma	EURONEAR	·	1.2 km	MPC · JPL
785631	2015 QW_{25}	—	August 21, 2015	Haleakala	Pan-STARRS 1	·	2.1 km	MPC · JPL
785632	2015 QL_{30}	—	August 18, 2015	Kitt Peak	Spacewatch	·	1.3 km	MPC · JPL
785633	2015 QW_{30}	—	August 21, 2015	Haleakala	Pan-STARRS 1	·	1.3 km	MPC · JPL
785634	2015 QM_{36}	—	August 21, 2015	Haleakala	Pan-STARRS 1	EUP	2.4 km	MPC · JPL
785635	2015 QS_{37}	—	August 21, 2015	Haleakala	Pan-STARRS 1	T_{j} (2.95)	2.8 km	MPC · JPL
785636	2015 QT_{37}	—	August 21, 2015	Haleakala	Pan-STARRS 1	·	1.6 km	MPC · JPL
785637	2015 QD_{43}	—	August 21, 2015	Haleakala	Pan-STARRS 1	·	2.3 km	MPC · JPL
785638	2015 RH_{3}	—	September 19, 1995	Kitt Peak	Spacewatch	MAR	730 m	MPC · JPL
785639	2015 RD_{22}	—	August 21, 2015	Haleakala	Pan-STARRS 1	·	1.7 km	MPC · JPL
785640	2015 RL_{22}	—	October 24, 2011	Haleakala	Pan-STARRS 1	·	1.4 km	MPC · JPL
785641	2015 RK_{23}	—	September 6, 2015	Kitt Peak	Spacewatch	·	1.6 km	MPC · JPL
785642	2015 RQ_{26}	—	July 25, 2015	Haleakala	Pan-STARRS 1	·	3.5 km	MPC · JPL
785643	2015 RL_{28}	—	February 11, 2004	Kitt Peak	Spacewatch	·	950 m	MPC · JPL
785644	2015 RW_{28}	—	July 25, 2015	Haleakala	Pan-STARRS 1	MAR	820 m	MPC · JPL
785645	2015 RF_{30}	—	February 26, 2004	Kitt Peak	Deep Ecliptic Survey	·	930 m	MPC · JPL
785646	2015 RO_{32}	—	April 20, 2014	Mount Lemmon	Mount Lemmon Survey	EUN	880 m	MPC · JPL
785647	2015 RH_{33}	—	April 30, 2014	Haleakala	Pan-STARRS 1	MAR	680 m	MPC · JPL
785648 Likho	2015 RG_{36}	Likho	September 11, 2015	Siding Spring	L. Elenin	AMO	310 m	MPC · JPL
785649	2015 RA_{47}	—	February 8, 2013	Haleakala	Pan-STARRS 1	·	1.2 km	MPC · JPL
785650	2015 RY_{47}	—	October 26, 2011	Haleakala	Pan-STARRS 1	·	740 m	MPC · JPL
785651	2015 RZ_{53}	—	November 30, 2011	Mount Lemmon	Mount Lemmon Survey	·	1.1 km	MPC · JPL
785652	2015 RO_{55}	—	December 4, 2007	Kitt Peak	Spacewatch	·	650 m	MPC · JPL
785653	2015 RZ_{55}	—	September 10, 2015	Haleakala	Pan-STARRS 1	HOF	1.8 km	MPC · JPL
785654	2015 RM_{64}	—	September 15, 2006	Kitt Peak	Spacewatch	·	1.3 km	MPC · JPL
785655	2015 RO_{70}	—	April 30, 2014	Haleakala	Pan-STARRS 1	·	1.3 km	MPC · JPL
785656	2015 RA_{71}	—	September 10, 2015	Haleakala	Pan-STARRS 1	·	800 m	MPC · JPL
785657	2015 RO_{71}	—	September 10, 2015	Haleakala	Pan-STARRS 1	·	2.1 km	MPC · JPL
785658	2015 RF_{72}	—	September 10, 2015	Haleakala	Pan-STARRS 1	·	990 m	MPC · JPL
785659	2015 RZ_{72}	—	October 10, 2007	Mount Lemmon	Mount Lemmon Survey	·	700 m	MPC · JPL
785660	2015 RK_{73}	—	May 23, 2014	Haleakala	Pan-STARRS 1	·	1.1 km	MPC · JPL
785661	2015 RF_{75}	—	September 10, 2015	Haleakala	Pan-STARRS 1	·	870 m	MPC · JPL
785662	2015 RM_{81}	—	August 12, 2015	Haleakala	Pan-STARRS 1	·	800 m	MPC · JPL
785663	2015 RP_{86}	—	July 23, 2015	Haleakala	Pan-STARRS 1	·	2.3 km	MPC · JPL
785664	2015 RW_{90}	—	June 26, 2015	Haleakala	Pan-STARRS 1	·	970 m	MPC · JPL
785665	2015 RB_{98}	—	October 23, 2011	Haleakala	Pan-STARRS 1	·	910 m	MPC · JPL
785666	2015 RQ_{99}	—	September 14, 2006	Catalina	CSS	·	1.5 km	MPC · JPL
785667	2015 RV_{99}	—	October 16, 2007	Mount Lemmon	Mount Lemmon Survey	(5)	980 m	MPC · JPL
785668	2015 RW_{112}	—	January 19, 2012	Haleakala	Pan-STARRS 1	·	2.7 km	MPC · JPL
785669	2015 RF_{114}	—	September 9, 2015	Haleakala	Pan-STARRS 1	MAR	760 m	MPC · JPL
785670	2015 RN_{119}	—	May 30, 2015	Haleakala	Pan-STARRS 1	TIR	2.2 km	MPC · JPL
785671	2015 RR_{124}	—	September 9, 2015	Haleakala	Pan-STARRS 1	ADE	1.1 km	MPC · JPL
785672	2015 RH_{132}	—	September 9, 2015	Haleakala	Pan-STARRS 1	·	2.2 km	MPC · JPL
785673	2015 RT_{134}	—	September 9, 2015	Haleakala	Pan-STARRS 1	·	1.8 km	MPC · JPL
785674	2015 RH_{138}	—	November 7, 2008	Mount Lemmon	Mount Lemmon Survey	3:2 · SHU	3.6 km	MPC · JPL
785675	2015 RJ_{138}	—	February 14, 2013	Haleakala	Pan-STARRS 1	·	1.5 km	MPC · JPL
785676	2015 RQ_{139}	—	August 21, 2015	Haleakala	Pan-STARRS 1	·	2.1 km	MPC · JPL
785677	2015 RS_{140}	—	September 6, 2015	Kitt Peak	Spacewatch	·	950 m	MPC · JPL
785678	2015 RN_{141}	—	September 9, 2015	Haleakala	Pan-STARRS 1	AGN	870 m	MPC · JPL
785679	2015 RY_{143}	—	May 21, 2014	Haleakala	Pan-STARRS 1	KOR	1.0 km	MPC · JPL
785680	2015 RD_{144}	—	September 9, 2015	Haleakala	Pan-STARRS 1	EUN	800 m	MPC · JPL
785681	2015 RC_{145}	—	September 9, 2015	Haleakala	Pan-STARRS 1	·	1.5 km	MPC · JPL
785682	2015 RO_{148}	—	May 8, 2014	Haleakala	Pan-STARRS 1	·	1.2 km	MPC · JPL
785683	2015 RL_{149}	—	February 3, 2013	Haleakala	Pan-STARRS 1	·	960 m	MPC · JPL
785684	2015 RJ_{161}	—	October 24, 2011	Haleakala	Pan-STARRS 1	AGN	740 m	MPC · JPL
785685	2015 RJ_{165}	—	September 14, 2007	Mount Lemmon	Mount Lemmon Survey	·	600 m	MPC · JPL
785686	2015 RM_{168}	—	October 28, 2010	Mount Lemmon	Mount Lemmon Survey	·	1.6 km	MPC · JPL
785687	2015 RB_{174}	—	September 9, 2015	Haleakala	Pan-STARRS 1	·	1.5 km	MPC · JPL
785688	2015 RH_{177}	—	September 9, 2015	Haleakala	Pan-STARRS 1	·	660 m	MPC · JPL
785689	2015 RP_{187}	—	October 10, 2010	Kitt Peak	Spacewatch	URS	2.1 km	MPC · JPL
785690	2015 RF_{195}	—	September 11, 2015	Haleakala	Pan-STARRS 1	AGN	790 m	MPC · JPL
785691	2015 RC_{196}	—	September 11, 2015	Haleakala	Pan-STARRS 1	·	900 m	MPC · JPL
785692	2015 RR_{196}	—	September 11, 2015	Haleakala	Pan-STARRS 1	·	1.1 km	MPC · JPL
785693	2015 RE_{200}	—	September 11, 2015	Haleakala	Pan-STARRS 1	·	2.2 km	MPC · JPL
785694	2015 RU_{201}	—	August 10, 2010	Kitt Peak	Spacewatch	AGN	930 m	MPC · JPL
785695	2015 RN_{202}	—	September 11, 2015	Haleakala	Pan-STARRS 1	·	910 m	MPC · JPL
785696	2015 RM_{203}	—	September 17, 2009	Mount Lemmon	Mount Lemmon Survey	(895)	2.6 km	MPC · JPL
785697	2015 RE_{215}	—	September 11, 2015	Haleakala	Pan-STARRS 1	·	1.4 km	MPC · JPL
785698	2015 RX_{216}	—	August 10, 2010	Kitt Peak	Spacewatch	·	1.3 km	MPC · JPL
785699	2015 RZ_{220}	—	September 11, 2015	Haleakala	Pan-STARRS 1	·	1.9 km	MPC · JPL
785700	2015 RL_{224}	—	September 11, 2015	Haleakala	Pan-STARRS 1	AEO	850 m	MPC · JPL

== 785701–785800 ==
back to top

Designation			Discovery			Properties		Ref
Permanent	Provisional	Named after	Date	Site	Discoverer(s)	Category	Diam.	Ref
785701	2015 RX_{224}	—	September 11, 2015	Haleakala	Pan-STARRS 1	·	690 m	MPC · JPL
785702	2015 RC_{225}	—	September 11, 2015	Haleakala	Pan-STARRS 1	·	2.4 km	MPC · JPL
785703	2015 RE_{225}	—	September 11, 2015	Haleakala	Pan-STARRS 1	AGN	860 m	MPC · JPL
785704	2015 RG_{225}	—	September 11, 2015	Haleakala	Pan-STARRS 1	·	1.4 km	MPC · JPL
785705	2015 RA_{231}	—	September 11, 2015	Haleakala	Pan-STARRS 1	·	810 m	MPC · JPL
785706	2015 RC_{239}	—	September 11, 2015	Haleakala	Pan-STARRS 1	·	970 m	MPC · JPL
785707	2015 RM_{239}	—	August 12, 2015	Haleakala	Pan-STARRS 1	·	1.1 km	MPC · JPL
785708	2015 RV_{241}	—	September 11, 2015	Haleakala	Pan-STARRS 1	·	2.1 km	MPC · JPL
785709	2015 RV_{243}	—	September 11, 2015	Cerro Burek	I. de la Cueva	·	890 m	MPC · JPL
785710	2015 RE_{244}	—	September 12, 2015	Piszkéstető	K. Sárneczky	·	1.0 km	MPC · JPL
785711	2015 RZ_{248}	—	September 9, 2015	Haleakala	Pan-STARRS 1	AGN	900 m	MPC · JPL
785712	2015 RF_{249}	—	September 9, 2015	Haleakala	Pan-STARRS 1	HNS	830 m	MPC · JPL
785713	2015 RJ_{249}	—	December 14, 2007	Mount Lemmon	Mount Lemmon Survey	(5)	1.1 km	MPC · JPL
785714	2015 RJ_{253}	—	July 28, 2014	Haleakala	Pan-STARRS 1	·	1.7 km	MPC · JPL
785715	2015 RZ_{253}	—	September 4, 2010	Mount Lemmon	Mount Lemmon Survey	KOR	940 m	MPC · JPL
785716	2015 RN_{254}	—	September 9, 2015	Haleakala	Pan-STARRS 1	·	1.2 km	MPC · JPL
785717	2015 RP_{254}	—	September 9, 2015	Haleakala	Pan-STARRS 1	·	1.3 km	MPC · JPL
785718	2015 RL_{255}	—	September 12, 2015	Haleakala	Pan-STARRS 1	·	1.2 km	MPC · JPL
785719	2015 RK_{256}	—	September 12, 2015	Haleakala	Pan-STARRS 1	·	720 m	MPC · JPL
785720	2015 RJ_{259}	—	September 10, 2015	Haleakala	Pan-STARRS 1	·	1.0 km	MPC · JPL
785721	2015 RL_{263}	—	September 8, 2015	Haleakala	Pan-STARRS 1	·	2.0 km	MPC · JPL
785722	2015 RA_{266}	—	October 18, 2011	Mount Lemmon	Mount Lemmon Survey	·	890 m	MPC · JPL
785723	2015 RK_{266}	—	September 9, 2015	Haleakala	Pan-STARRS 1	·	930 m	MPC · JPL
785724	2015 RN_{267}	—	September 9, 2015	Haleakala	Pan-STARRS 1	·	1.4 km	MPC · JPL
785725	2015 RD_{268}	—	September 9, 2015	Haleakala	Pan-STARRS 1	DOR	1.7 km	MPC · JPL
785726	2015 RO_{268}	—	September 9, 2015	Haleakala	Pan-STARRS 1	·	1.0 km	MPC · JPL
785727	2015 RO_{269}	—	September 10, 2015	Haleakala	Pan-STARRS 1	·	1.1 km	MPC · JPL
785728	2015 RO_{270}	—	December 8, 2010	Kitt Peak	Spacewatch	THM	1.7 km	MPC · JPL
785729	2015 RZ_{270}	—	November 25, 2006	Kitt Peak	Spacewatch	·	1.7 km	MPC · JPL
785730	2015 RQ_{271}	—	September 11, 2015	Haleakala	Pan-STARRS 1	·	1.2 km	MPC · JPL
785731	2015 RH_{272}	—	September 11, 2015	Haleakala	Pan-STARRS 1	·	590 m	MPC · JPL
785732	2015 RN_{272}	—	September 11, 2015	Haleakala	Pan-STARRS 1	EUN	930 m	MPC · JPL
785733	2015 RH_{273}	—	September 11, 2015	Haleakala	Pan-STARRS 1	·	1.1 km	MPC · JPL
785734	2015 RS_{274}	—	May 21, 2014	Haleakala	Pan-STARRS 1	·	970 m	MPC · JPL
785735	2015 RW_{274}	—	September 12, 2015	Haleakala	Pan-STARRS 1	·	1.7 km	MPC · JPL
785736	2015 RC_{275}	—	May 21, 2014	Haleakala	Pan-STARRS 1	·	1.1 km	MPC · JPL
785737	2015 RZ_{275}	—	October 11, 2010	Mount Lemmon	Mount Lemmon Survey	·	2.1 km	MPC · JPL
785738	2015 RR_{288}	—	September 11, 2015	Haleakala	Pan-STARRS 1	·	930 m	MPC · JPL
785739	2015 RZ_{289}	—	September 9, 2015	Haleakala	Pan-STARRS 1	·	1.1 km	MPC · JPL
785740	2015 RA_{290}	—	September 9, 2015	Haleakala	Pan-STARRS 1	·	840 m	MPC · JPL
785741	2015 RR_{291}	—	September 9, 2015	Haleakala	Pan-STARRS 1	·	840 m	MPC · JPL
785742	2015 RA_{292}	—	August 9, 2015	Haleakala	Pan-STARRS 1	·	980 m	MPC · JPL
785743	2015 RZ_{293}	—	September 9, 2015	Haleakala	Pan-STARRS 1	EUN	810 m	MPC · JPL
785744	2015 RV_{302}	—	September 11, 2015	Haleakala	Pan-STARRS 1	·	1.1 km	MPC · JPL
785745	2015 RA_{303}	—	September 9, 2015	Haleakala	Pan-STARRS 1	·	1.5 km	MPC · JPL
785746	2015 RG_{303}	—	September 11, 2015	Haleakala	Pan-STARRS 1	PAD	1.1 km	MPC · JPL
785747	2015 RW_{304}	—	September 12, 2015	Haleakala	Pan-STARRS 1	·	800 m	MPC · JPL
785748	2015 RX_{310}	—	September 10, 2015	Haleakala	Pan-STARRS 1	·	900 m	MPC · JPL
785749	2015 RH_{312}	—	September 12, 2015	Haleakala	Pan-STARRS 1	·	830 m	MPC · JPL
785750	2015 RW_{314}	—	September 9, 2015	Haleakala	Pan-STARRS 1	·	1.6 km	MPC · JPL
785751	2015 RB_{315}	—	September 12, 2015	Haleakala	Pan-STARRS 1	EOS	1.1 km	MPC · JPL
785752	2015 RQ_{315}	—	September 9, 2015	Haleakala	Pan-STARRS 1	KOR	1.1 km	MPC · JPL
785753	2015 RH_{316}	—	September 12, 2015	Haleakala	Pan-STARRS 1	·	1.3 km	MPC · JPL
785754	2015 RK_{321}	—	September 9, 2015	Haleakala	Pan-STARRS 1	·	770 m	MPC · JPL
785755	2015 RF_{322}	—	September 6, 2015	Kitt Peak	Spacewatch	AGN	850 m	MPC · JPL
785756	2015 RQ_{322}	—	September 10, 2015	Haleakala	Pan-STARRS 1	·	1.4 km	MPC · JPL
785757	2015 RS_{323}	—	September 12, 2015	Haleakala	Pan-STARRS 1	·	740 m	MPC · JPL
785758	2015 RY_{324}	—	September 9, 2015	Haleakala	Pan-STARRS 1	·	1.2 km	MPC · JPL
785759	2015 RG_{333}	—	September 9, 2015	Haleakala	Pan-STARRS 1	KOR	1.1 km	MPC · JPL
785760	2015 RP_{333}	—	September 11, 2015	Haleakala	Pan-STARRS 1	·	1.2 km	MPC · JPL
785761	2015 RW_{337}	—	September 12, 2015	Haleakala	Pan-STARRS 1	AGN	850 m	MPC · JPL
785762	2015 RY_{337}	—	March 6, 2013	Haleakala	Pan-STARRS 1	·	1.5 km	MPC · JPL
785763	2015 RM_{341}	—	September 9, 2015	Haleakala	Pan-STARRS 1	·	3.2 km	MPC · JPL
785764	2015 RE_{343}	—	September 6, 2015	Haleakala	Pan-STARRS 1	·	2.2 km	MPC · JPL
785765	2015 RX_{348}	—	September 5, 2015	Nauchnyi	G. Borisov	·	2.6 km	MPC · JPL
785766	2015 RO_{353}	—	September 12, 2015	Haleakala	Pan-STARRS 1	·	1.9 km	MPC · JPL
785767	2015 RQ_{356}	—	September 12, 2015	Haleakala	Pan-STARRS 1	EOS	1.2 km	MPC · JPL
785768	2015 RF_{357}	—	September 11, 2015	Haleakala	Pan-STARRS 1	·	1.4 km	MPC · JPL
785769	2015 RW_{357}	—	September 9, 2015	Haleakala	Pan-STARRS 1	·	1.1 km	MPC · JPL
785770	2015 RC_{359}	—	September 6, 2015	Kitt Peak	Spacewatch	·	1.2 km	MPC · JPL
785771	2015 RZ_{359}	—	January 23, 2004	Anderson Mesa	LONEOS	·	1.5 km	MPC · JPL
785772	2015 RB_{362}	—	September 27, 2011	Mount Lemmon	Mount Lemmon Survey	·	1.1 km	MPC · JPL
785773	2015 RJ_{362}	—	March 13, 2013	Mount Lemmon	Mount Lemmon Survey	·	1.4 km	MPC · JPL
785774	2015 RY_{362}	—	September 12, 2015	Haleakala	Pan-STARRS 1	·	1.1 km	MPC · JPL
785775	2015 RF_{365}	—	September 12, 2015	Haleakala	Pan-STARRS 1	3:2	3.9 km	MPC · JPL
785776	2015 RO_{365}	—	May 7, 2014	Haleakala	Pan-STARRS 1	·	1.2 km	MPC · JPL
785777	2015 RQ_{365}	—	September 12, 2015	Haleakala	Pan-STARRS 1	RAF	740 m	MPC · JPL
785778	2015 RU_{365}	—	April 4, 2014	Mount Lemmon	Mount Lemmon Survey	·	650 m	MPC · JPL
785779	2015 RD_{367}	—	September 11, 2015	Haleakala	Pan-STARRS 1	·	1.2 km	MPC · JPL
785780	2015 RV_{376}	—	September 11, 2015	Haleakala	Pan-STARRS 1	·	1.3 km	MPC · JPL
785781	2015 RB_{380}	—	September 12, 2015	Haleakala	Pan-STARRS 1	3:2	3.4 km	MPC · JPL
785782	2015 RN_{380}	—	September 9, 2015	Haleakala	Pan-STARRS 1	·	2.3 km	MPC · JPL
785783	2015 RQ_{380}	—	September 9, 2015	Haleakala	Pan-STARRS 1	·	830 m	MPC · JPL
785784	2015 RB_{381}	—	October 2, 2003	Kitt Peak	Spacewatch	·	790 m	MPC · JPL
785785	2015 RK_{395}	—	October 26, 2011	Haleakala	Pan-STARRS 1	·	880 m	MPC · JPL
785786	2015 SD_{3}	—	September 20, 2015	Mount Lemmon	Mount Lemmon Survey	·	930 m	MPC · JPL
785787	2015 SP_{4}	—	November 17, 2011	Kitt Peak	Spacewatch	·	1.0 km	MPC · JPL
785788	2015 SN_{15}	—	April 5, 2014	Haleakala	Pan-STARRS 1	·	1.1 km	MPC · JPL
785789	2015 SO_{19}	—	October 20, 2011	Mount Lemmon	Mount Lemmon Survey	·	1.1 km	MPC · JPL
785790	2015 SQ_{22}	—	September 23, 2015	Haleakala	Pan-STARRS 1	·	1.7 km	MPC · JPL
785791	2015 SS_{26}	—	June 24, 2014	Haleakala	Pan-STARRS 1	·	1.3 km	MPC · JPL
785792	2015 SU_{26}	—	September 23, 2015	Mount Lemmon	Mount Lemmon Survey	·	2.5 km	MPC · JPL
785793	2015 SD_{29}	—	December 6, 2007	Mount Lemmon	Mount Lemmon Survey	·	890 m	MPC · JPL
785794	2015 SE_{30}	—	September 23, 2015	Haleakala	Pan-STARRS 1	·	1.9 km	MPC · JPL
785795	2015 SH_{33}	—	September 23, 2015	Haleakala	Pan-STARRS 1	·	940 m	MPC · JPL
785796	2015 SN_{38}	—	September 23, 2015	Haleakala	Pan-STARRS 1	·	1.2 km	MPC · JPL
785797	2015 SP_{38}	—	September 23, 2015	Haleakala	Pan-STARRS 1	MAR	670 m	MPC · JPL
785798	2015 SX_{38}	—	September 20, 2015	Mount Lemmon	Mount Lemmon Survey	MAR	760 m	MPC · JPL
785799	2015 SA_{39}	—	September 23, 2015	Haleakala	Pan-STARRS 1	·	950 m	MPC · JPL
785800	2015 SL_{39}	—	May 20, 2014	Haleakala	Pan-STARRS 1	·	2.4 km	MPC · JPL

== 785801–785900 ==
back to top

Designation			Discovery			Properties		Ref
Permanent	Provisional	Named after	Date	Site	Discoverer(s)	Category	Diam.	Ref
785801	2015 SY_{41}	—	September 23, 2015	Haleakala	Pan-STARRS 1	EOS	1.2 km	MPC · JPL
785802	2015 SB_{49}	—	September 23, 2015	Haleakala	Pan-STARRS 1	·	1.0 km	MPC · JPL
785803	2015 SS_{53}	—	September 18, 2015	Mount Lemmon	Mount Lemmon Survey	·	980 m	MPC · JPL
785804	2015 SR_{56}	—	December 6, 2008	Kitt Peak	Spacewatch	T_{j} (2.96) · 3:2	3.6 km	MPC · JPL
785805	2015 ST_{56}	—	September 23, 2015	Haleakala	Pan-STARRS 1	·	1.3 km	MPC · JPL
785806	2015 SG_{57}	—	May 8, 2014	Haleakala	Pan-STARRS 1	·	980 m	MPC · JPL
785807	2015 SG_{59}	—	September 23, 2015	Haleakala	Pan-STARRS 1	·	1.5 km	MPC · JPL
785808	2015 TZ_{5}	—	July 19, 2015	Haleakala	Pan-STARRS 2	·	770 m	MPC · JPL
785809	2015 TK_{14}	—	July 25, 2015	Haleakala	Pan-STARRS 1	·	1.0 km	MPC · JPL
785810	2015 TC_{15}	—	July 25, 2015	Haleakala	Pan-STARRS 1	·	850 m	MPC · JPL
785811	2015 TF_{25}	—	October 7, 2015	Saint-Pardon-de-Conques	Losse, F.	EUN	820 m	MPC · JPL
785812	2015 TQ_{27}	—	October 8, 2015	Haleakala	Pan-STARRS 1	·	2.4 km	MPC · JPL
785813	2015 TX_{31}	—	October 8, 2007	Mount Lemmon	Mount Lemmon Survey	·	1.2 km	MPC · JPL
785814	2015 TE_{35}	—	September 6, 2015	Haleakala	Pan-STARRS 1	·	1.4 km	MPC · JPL
785815	2015 TV_{37}	—	May 4, 2014	Haleakala	Pan-STARRS 1	·	1.4 km	MPC · JPL
785816	2015 TE_{39}	—	September 19, 1998	Apache Point	SDSS	·	2.6 km	MPC · JPL
785817	2015 TV_{48}	—	September 23, 2015	Mount Lemmon	Mount Lemmon Survey	·	1.2 km	MPC · JPL
785818	2015 TC_{51}	—	October 24, 2011	Haleakala	Pan-STARRS 1	·	1.1 km	MPC · JPL
785819	2015 TD_{51}	—	July 23, 2015	Haleakala	Pan-STARRS 1	·	1.5 km	MPC · JPL
785820	2015 TN_{52}	—	March 6, 2014	Catalina	CSS	·	1.1 km	MPC · JPL
785821	2015 TH_{58}	—	September 11, 2015	Haleakala	Pan-STARRS 1	·	670 m	MPC · JPL
785822	2015 TV_{61}	—	February 7, 2013	Kitt Peak	Spacewatch	·	980 m	MPC · JPL
785823	2015 TG_{62}	—	April 30, 2009	Kitt Peak	Spacewatch	EUN	770 m	MPC · JPL
785824	2015 TR_{71}	—	October 25, 2011	Haleakala	Pan-STARRS 1	·	920 m	MPC · JPL
785825	2015 TY_{71}	—	October 8, 2015	Haleakala	Pan-STARRS 1	·	890 m	MPC · JPL
785826	2015 TR_{73}	—	September 9, 2015	Haleakala	Pan-STARRS 1	·	1.2 km	MPC · JPL
785827	2015 TZ_{79}	—	September 9, 2015	Haleakala	Pan-STARRS 1	·	2.2 km	MPC · JPL
785828	2015 TA_{80}	—	October 8, 2015	Haleakala	Pan-STARRS 1	EUN	630 m	MPC · JPL
785829	2015 TC_{80}	—	October 8, 2015	Haleakala	Pan-STARRS 1	·	1.2 km	MPC · JPL
785830	2015 TV_{81}	—	September 9, 2015	Haleakala	Pan-STARRS 1	·	870 m	MPC · JPL
785831	2015 TY_{83}	—	October 8, 2015	Haleakala	Pan-STARRS 1	·	1.4 km	MPC · JPL
785832	2015 TC_{85}	—	October 8, 2015	Haleakala	Pan-STARRS 1	·	1.4 km	MPC · JPL
785833	2015 TK_{91}	—	October 27, 2005	Mount Lemmon	Mount Lemmon Survey	·	1.5 km	MPC · JPL
785834	2015 TR_{93}	—	October 8, 2015	Haleakala	Pan-STARRS 1	·	1.1 km	MPC · JPL
785835	2015 TM_{95}	—	October 8, 2015	Haleakala	Pan-STARRS 1	EUN	1.0 km	MPC · JPL
785836	2015 TF_{96}	—	October 8, 2015	Mount Lemmon	Mount Lemmon Survey	HNS	790 m	MPC · JPL
785837	2015 TW_{97}	—	September 4, 2010	Mount Lemmon	Mount Lemmon Survey	·	1.2 km	MPC · JPL
785838	2015 TE_{100}	—	September 9, 2015	Haleakala	Pan-STARRS 1	·	830 m	MPC · JPL
785839	2015 TQ_{101}	—	October 8, 2015	Haleakala	Pan-STARRS 1	·	1.4 km	MPC · JPL
785840	2015 TM_{104}	—	October 8, 2015	Haleakala	Pan-STARRS 1	(5)	1.1 km	MPC · JPL
785841	2015 TZ_{106}	—	November 26, 2011	Mount Lemmon	Mount Lemmon Survey	·	1.0 km	MPC · JPL
785842	2015 TZ_{108}	—	May 30, 2014	Mount Lemmon	Mount Lemmon Survey	·	1.1 km	MPC · JPL
785843	2015 TJ_{109}	—	October 8, 2015	Haleakala	Pan-STARRS 1	·	960 m	MPC · JPL
785844	2015 TK_{109}	—	January 1, 2012	Mount Lemmon	Mount Lemmon Survey	·	820 m	MPC · JPL
785845	2015 TB_{110}	—	October 8, 2015	Haleakala	Pan-STARRS 1	·	1.2 km	MPC · JPL
785846	2015 TR_{112}	—	December 27, 2011	Mount Lemmon	Mount Lemmon Survey	·	1.1 km	MPC · JPL
785847	2015 TX_{113}	—	October 8, 2015	Haleakala	Pan-STARRS 1	JUN	730 m	MPC · JPL
785848	2015 TX_{114}	—	October 8, 2015	Haleakala	Pan-STARRS 1	·	1.0 km	MPC · JPL
785849	2015 TC_{121}	—	October 8, 2015	Haleakala	Pan-STARRS 1	·	1.2 km	MPC · JPL
785850	2015 TC_{130}	—	October 8, 2015	Haleakala	Pan-STARRS 1	·	1.1 km	MPC · JPL
785851	2015 TT_{132}	—	August 12, 2015	Haleakala	Pan-STARRS 1	·	1.3 km	MPC · JPL
785852	2015 TQ_{135}	—	October 23, 2011	Haleakala	Pan-STARRS 1	·	890 m	MPC · JPL
785853	2015 TY_{136}	—	October 8, 2015	Haleakala	Pan-STARRS 1	·	1.9 km	MPC · JPL
785854	2015 TK_{138}	—	October 8, 2015	Haleakala	Pan-STARRS 1	·	1.0 km	MPC · JPL
785855	2015 TT_{141}	—	October 8, 2015	Haleakala	Pan-STARRS 1	·	1.4 km	MPC · JPL
785856	2015 TA_{146}	—	October 2, 2015	Mount Lemmon	Mount Lemmon Survey	·	1.2 km	MPC · JPL
785857	2015 TE_{149}	—	September 24, 1995	Kitt Peak	Spacewatch	KOR	1.2 km	MPC · JPL
785858	2015 TM_{149}	—	September 10, 2015	Haleakala	Pan-STARRS 1	·	780 m	MPC · JPL
785859	2015 TS_{150}	—	September 11, 2015	Haleakala	Pan-STARRS 1	·	960 m	MPC · JPL
785860	2015 TA_{151}	—	October 5, 2004	Kitt Peak	Spacewatch	THM	1.9 km	MPC · JPL
785861	2015 TQ_{151}	—	July 23, 2015	Haleakala	Pan-STARRS 1	KOR	1.1 km	MPC · JPL
785862	2015 TV_{155}	—	October 18, 2011	Kitt Peak	Spacewatch	·	780 m	MPC · JPL
785863	2015 TL_{166}	—	October 9, 2015	Kitt Peak	Spacewatch	·	920 m	MPC · JPL
785864	2015 TV_{168}	—	October 3, 2015	Mount Lemmon	Mount Lemmon Survey	KON	1.7 km	MPC · JPL
785865	2015 TR_{170}	—	October 9, 2015	Haleakala	Pan-STARRS 1	·	770 m	MPC · JPL
785866	2015 TL_{174}	—	October 9, 2015	Haleakala	Pan-STARRS 1	·	1.1 km	MPC · JPL
785867	2015 TD_{178}	—	October 9, 2004	Anderson Mesa	LONEOS	·	1.1 km	MPC · JPL
785868	2015 TF_{185}	—	October 9, 2015	Haleakala	Pan-STARRS 1	·	1.1 km	MPC · JPL
785869	2015 TO_{186}	—	October 9, 2015	Haleakala	Pan-STARRS 1	·	930 m	MPC · JPL
785870	2015 TN_{187}	—	October 9, 2015	Haleakala	Pan-STARRS 1	AGN	890 m	MPC · JPL
785871	2015 TS_{189}	—	August 28, 2015	Haleakala	Pan-STARRS 1	3:2	4.7 km	MPC · JPL
785872	2015 TF_{193}	—	January 20, 2008	Mount Lemmon	Mount Lemmon Survey	·	900 m	MPC · JPL
785873	2015 TE_{195}	—	October 9, 2015	XuYi	PMO NEO Survey Program	·	1.2 km	MPC · JPL
785874	2015 TC_{204}	—	April 17, 2013	Cerro Tololo-DECam	DECam	·	870 m	MPC · JPL
785875	2015 TE_{204}	—	September 9, 2015	Haleakala	Pan-STARRS 1	EUN	1.1 km	MPC · JPL
785876	2015 TO_{204}	—	October 5, 2002	Apache Point	SDSS	·	1.3 km	MPC · JPL
785877	2015 TH_{208}	—	October 12, 1994	Kitt Peak	Spacewatch	·	1.0 km	MPC · JPL
785878	2015 TO_{215}	—	September 2, 2010	Mount Lemmon	Mount Lemmon Survey	·	1.8 km	MPC · JPL
785879	2015 TP_{215}	—	August 21, 2006	Kitt Peak	Spacewatch	·	1.1 km	MPC · JPL
785880	2015 TB_{220}	—	September 11, 2015	Haleakala	Pan-STARRS 1	·	800 m	MPC · JPL
785881	2015 TC_{226}	—	September 9, 2015	Haleakala	Pan-STARRS 1	·	1.9 km	MPC · JPL
785882	2015 TV_{229}	—	October 10, 2015	Haleakala	Pan-STARRS 1	·	1.3 km	MPC · JPL
785883	2015 TY_{234}	—	October 11, 2015	Mount Lemmon	Mount Lemmon Survey	·	1.3 km	MPC · JPL
785884	2015 TG_{248}	—	October 2, 2015	Mount Lemmon	Mount Lemmon Survey	·	1.8 km	MPC · JPL
785885	2015 TF_{249}	—	October 18, 2011	Mount Lemmon	Mount Lemmon Survey	·	1.2 km	MPC · JPL
785886	2015 TW_{251}	—	November 25, 2011	Haleakala	Pan-STARRS 1	(5)	930 m	MPC · JPL
785887	2015 TX_{256}	—	September 18, 2006	Kitt Peak	Spacewatch	·	1.6 km	MPC · JPL
785888	2015 TD_{264}	—	May 7, 2014	Haleakala	Pan-STARRS 1	·	800 m	MPC · JPL
785889	2015 TJ_{269}	—	April 17, 2013	Cerro Tololo-DECam	DECam	EUN	790 m	MPC · JPL
785890	2015 TG_{273}	—	October 6, 2004	Kitt Peak	Spacewatch	·	2.0 km	MPC · JPL
785891	2015 TN_{273}	—	October 12, 2015	Haleakala	Pan-STARRS 1	·	1.1 km	MPC · JPL
785892	2015 TF_{278}	—	November 25, 2011	Haleakala	Pan-STARRS 1	·	1.1 km	MPC · JPL
785893	2015 TM_{279}	—	October 3, 2015	Mount Lemmon	Mount Lemmon Survey	TIR	1.8 km	MPC · JPL
785894	2015 TS_{279}	—	July 30, 2014	Haleakala	Pan-STARRS 1	VER	1.9 km	MPC · JPL
785895	2015 TY_{280}	—	October 2, 2015	Mount Lemmon	Mount Lemmon Survey	·	1.3 km	MPC · JPL
785896	2015 TS_{283}	—	October 2, 2015	Mount Lemmon	Mount Lemmon Survey	HOF	1.7 km	MPC · JPL
785897	2015 TA_{285}	—	October 15, 2010	Mayhill-ISON	L. Elenin	·	1.7 km	MPC · JPL
785898	2015 TN_{285}	—	October 12, 2015	Haleakala	Pan-STARRS 1	BRG	940 m	MPC · JPL
785899	2015 TS_{285}	—	October 8, 2015	Mount Lemmon	Mount Lemmon Survey	EUN	680 m	MPC · JPL
785900	2015 TL_{289}	—	August 19, 2006	Kitt Peak	Spacewatch	·	1.2 km	MPC · JPL

== 785901–786000 ==
back to top

Designation			Discovery			Properties		Ref
Permanent	Provisional	Named after	Date	Site	Discoverer(s)	Category	Diam.	Ref
785901	2015 TZ_{292}	—	July 25, 2015	Haleakala	Pan-STARRS 1	·	990 m	MPC · JPL
785902	2015 TT_{293}	—	October 20, 2011	Mount Lemmon	Mount Lemmon Survey	MAR	620 m	MPC · JPL
785903	2015 TE_{294}	—	August 12, 2015	Haleakala	Pan-STARRS 1	·	1.3 km	MPC · JPL
785904	2015 TS_{295}	—	December 1, 2010	Mount Lemmon	Mount Lemmon Survey	·	1.7 km	MPC · JPL
785905	2015 TP_{297}	—	October 12, 2015	Haleakala	Pan-STARRS 1	·	1.1 km	MPC · JPL
785906	2015 TT_{298}	—	November 18, 2011	Mount Lemmon	Mount Lemmon Survey	EUN	900 m	MPC · JPL
785907	2015 TG_{304}	—	September 24, 2011	Haleakala	Pan-STARRS 1	·	860 m	MPC · JPL
785908	2015 TJ_{304}	—	October 12, 2015	Haleakala	Pan-STARRS 1	·	1.7 km	MPC · JPL
785909	2015 TK_{305}	—	June 5, 2014	Haleakala	Pan-STARRS 1	·	1.2 km	MPC · JPL
785910	2015 TO_{307}	—	June 30, 2014	Haleakala	Pan-STARRS 1	·	1.8 km	MPC · JPL
785911	2015 TU_{309}	—	October 10, 2015	Haleakala	Pan-STARRS 1	THB	2.1 km	MPC · JPL
785912	2015 TG_{324}	—	January 19, 2012	Haleakala	Pan-STARRS 1	·	1.6 km	MPC · JPL
785913	2015 TK_{324}	—	December 29, 2011	Mount Lemmon	Mount Lemmon Survey	·	1.3 km	MPC · JPL
785914	2015 TR_{336}	—	November 30, 2011	Mount Lemmon	Mount Lemmon Survey	·	1.0 km	MPC · JPL
785915	2015 TO_{338}	—	September 12, 2007	Catalina	CSS	EUN	930 m	MPC · JPL
785916	2015 TR_{339}	—	August 12, 2015	Haleakala	Pan-STARRS 1	·	1.3 km	MPC · JPL
785917	2015 TS_{339}	—	September 27, 2010	Kitt Peak	Spacewatch	KOR	1.1 km	MPC · JPL
785918	2015 TQ_{344}	—	March 13, 2013	Mount Lemmon	Mount Lemmon Survey	·	970 m	MPC · JPL
785919	2015 TC_{345}	—	October 15, 2015	Mount Lemmon	Mount Lemmon Survey	·	1.2 km	MPC · JPL
785920	2015 TN_{345}	—	October 10, 2015	Haleakala	Pan-STARRS 1	(5)	710 m	MPC · JPL
785921	2015 TA_{351}	—	October 13, 2015	Haleakala	Pan-STARRS 1	·	1.7 km	MPC · JPL
785922	2015 TV_{354}	—	October 8, 2015	Haleakala	Pan-STARRS 1	·	990 m	MPC · JPL
785923	2015 TX_{355}	—	October 9, 2015	Haleakala	Pan-STARRS 1	·	1.2 km	MPC · JPL
785924	2015 TO_{356}	—	October 9, 2015	Haleakala	Pan-STARRS 1	·	870 m	MPC · JPL
785925	2015 TR_{356}	—	October 10, 2015	Kitt Peak	Spacewatch	·	980 m	MPC · JPL
785926	2015 TJ_{357}	—	October 10, 2015	Haleakala	Pan-STARRS 1	·	1.0 km	MPC · JPL
785927	2015 TV_{359}	—	November 27, 2006	Mount Lemmon	Mount Lemmon Survey	AGN	910 m	MPC · JPL
785928	2015 TS_{365}	—	October 8, 2015	Haleakala	Pan-STARRS 1	EUN	730 m	MPC · JPL
785929	2015 TT_{365}	—	October 13, 2010	Kitt Peak	Spacewatch	·	1.4 km	MPC · JPL
785930	2015 TX_{365}	—	October 10, 2015	Haleakala	Pan-STARRS 1	·	1.1 km	MPC · JPL
785931	2015 TY_{369}	—	January 12, 2008	Kitt Peak	Spacewatch	·	900 m	MPC · JPL
785932	2015 TH_{371}	—	February 9, 2008	Mount Lemmon	Mount Lemmon Survey	·	1 km	MPC · JPL
785933	2015 TC_{372}	—	October 8, 2015	Haleakala	Pan-STARRS 1	·	840 m	MPC · JPL
785934	2015 TJ_{372}	—	October 8, 2015	Haleakala	Pan-STARRS 1	·	1.2 km	MPC · JPL
785935	2015 TM_{373}	—	October 26, 2011	Haleakala	Pan-STARRS 1	·	1.0 km	MPC · JPL
785936	2015 TV_{374}	—	October 8, 2015	Haleakala	Pan-STARRS 1	·	930 m	MPC · JPL
785937	2015 TR_{375}	—	November 1, 2010	Mount Lemmon	Mount Lemmon Survey	KOR	830 m	MPC · JPL
785938	2015 TV_{375}	—	January 2, 2012	Mount Lemmon	Mount Lemmon Survey	·	1.3 km	MPC · JPL
785939	2015 TY_{375}	—	October 9, 2015	Haleakala	Pan-STARRS 1	·	960 m	MPC · JPL
785940	2015 TE_{376}	—	October 9, 2015	Haleakala	Pan-STARRS 1	·	870 m	MPC · JPL
785941	2015 TL_{377}	—	October 9, 2015	Haleakala	Pan-STARRS 1	·	900 m	MPC · JPL
785942	2015 TQ_{377}	—	October 9, 2015	Haleakala	Pan-STARRS 1	·	1.5 km	MPC · JPL
785943	2015 TW_{378}	—	September 10, 2004	Kitt Peak	Spacewatch	·	1.8 km	MPC · JPL
785944	2015 TZ_{379}	—	December 27, 2011	Mount Lemmon	Mount Lemmon Survey	EUN	670 m	MPC · JPL
785945	2015 TV_{380}	—	October 10, 2015	Haleakala	Pan-STARRS 1	·	1.5 km	MPC · JPL
785946	2015 TY_{380}	—	October 10, 2015	Haleakala	Pan-STARRS 1	·	1.0 km	MPC · JPL
785947	2015 TA_{382}	—	October 10, 2015	Haleakala	Pan-STARRS 1	·	1.4 km	MPC · JPL
785948	2015 TJ_{382}	—	January 26, 2007	Kitt Peak	Spacewatch	·	1.2 km	MPC · JPL
785949	2015 TN_{383}	—	October 10, 2015	Haleakala	Pan-STARRS 1	AGN	820 m	MPC · JPL
785950	2015 TQ_{383}	—	October 11, 2015	Mount Lemmon	Mount Lemmon Survey	·	1.7 km	MPC · JPL
785951	2015 TV_{384}	—	October 21, 2011	Mount Lemmon	Mount Lemmon Survey	·	930 m	MPC · JPL
785952	2015 TM_{385}	—	December 17, 2007	Kitt Peak	Spacewatch	·	1.1 km	MPC · JPL
785953	2015 TK_{388}	—	October 8, 2015	Haleakala	Pan-STARRS 1	·	1.5 km	MPC · JPL
785954	2015 TL_{388}	—	October 15, 2015	Haleakala	Pan-STARRS 1	TIR	1.9 km	MPC · JPL
785955	2015 TW_{389}	—	October 8, 2015	Haleakala	Pan-STARRS 1	EUN	840 m	MPC · JPL
785956	2015 TN_{391}	—	October 8, 2015	Haleakala	Pan-STARRS 1	·	770 m	MPC · JPL
785957	2015 TK_{396}	—	October 11, 2015	Mount Lemmon	Mount Lemmon Survey	·	980 m	MPC · JPL
785958	2015 TR_{396}	—	October 11, 2015	Mount Lemmon	Mount Lemmon Survey	·	970 m	MPC · JPL
785959	2015 TC_{399}	—	October 10, 2015	Haleakala	Pan-STARRS 1	GAL	1.1 km	MPC · JPL
785960	2015 TQ_{402}	—	October 9, 2015	XuYi	PMO NEO Survey Program	·	860 m	MPC · JPL
785961	2015 TV_{404}	—	October 8, 2015	Haleakala	Pan-STARRS 1	·	930 m	MPC · JPL
785962	2015 TA_{409}	—	October 2, 2015	Mount Lemmon	Mount Lemmon Survey	KRM	1.2 km	MPC · JPL
785963	2015 TC_{411}	—	October 10, 2015	Haleakala	Pan-STARRS 1	·	1.2 km	MPC · JPL
785964	2015 TO_{411}	—	October 8, 2015	Haleakala	Pan-STARRS 1	·	940 m	MPC · JPL
785965	2015 TP_{411}	—	October 9, 2015	Haleakala	Pan-STARRS 1	HNS	660 m	MPC · JPL
785966	2015 TU_{411}	—	October 3, 2015	Mount Lemmon	Mount Lemmon Survey	·	820 m	MPC · JPL
785967	2015 TA_{412}	—	October 8, 2015	Haleakala	Pan-STARRS 1	·	1.0 km	MPC · JPL
785968	2015 TE_{412}	—	October 12, 2015	Haleakala	Pan-STARRS 1	·	920 m	MPC · JPL
785969	2015 TF_{412}	—	October 10, 2015	Haleakala	Pan-STARRS 1	·	820 m	MPC · JPL
785970	2015 TA_{417}	—	October 2, 2015	Mount Lemmon	Mount Lemmon Survey	·	1.8 km	MPC · JPL
785971	2015 TH_{417}	—	October 10, 2015	Haleakala	Pan-STARRS 1	·	1.2 km	MPC · JPL
785972	2015 TN_{417}	—	October 10, 2015	Haleakala	Pan-STARRS 1	·	1.7 km	MPC · JPL
785973	2015 TQ_{418}	—	October 9, 2015	Haleakala	Pan-STARRS 1	·	1.4 km	MPC · JPL
785974	2015 TV_{418}	—	October 2, 2015	Mount Lemmon	Mount Lemmon Survey	·	1.3 km	MPC · JPL
785975	2015 TM_{423}	—	October 13, 2015	Haleakala	Pan-STARRS 1	·	2.1 km	MPC · JPL
785976	2015 TH_{426}	—	October 1, 2015	Mount Lemmon	Mount Lemmon Survey	·	1.3 km	MPC · JPL
785977	2015 TL_{428}	—	October 15, 2015	Haleakala	Pan-STARRS 1	EUN	790 m	MPC · JPL
785978	2015 TR_{429}	—	October 8, 2015	Haleakala	Pan-STARRS 1	·	1.9 km	MPC · JPL
785979	2015 TX_{431}	—	October 10, 2015	Haleakala	Pan-STARRS 1	HNS	670 m	MPC · JPL
785980	2015 TJ_{433}	—	October 8, 2015	Haleakala	Pan-STARRS 1	·	950 m	MPC · JPL
785981	2015 TK_{433}	—	October 10, 2015	Haleakala	Pan-STARRS 1	·	1.1 km	MPC · JPL
785982	2015 TU_{434}	—	October 13, 2015	Haleakala	Pan-STARRS 1	·	1.6 km	MPC · JPL
785983	2015 TY_{436}	—	October 8, 2015	Haleakala	Pan-STARRS 1	·	1.2 km	MPC · JPL
785984	2015 TZ_{436}	—	October 3, 2015	Mount Lemmon	Mount Lemmon Survey	·	1.3 km	MPC · JPL
785985	2015 TU_{440}	—	October 3, 2015	Mount Lemmon	Mount Lemmon Survey	·	1.4 km	MPC · JPL
785986	2015 TO_{441}	—	October 5, 2015	Haleakala	Pan-STARRS 1	·	920 m	MPC · JPL
785987	2015 TB_{442}	—	October 10, 2015	Haleakala	Pan-STARRS 1	GEF	1.0 km	MPC · JPL
785988	2015 TD_{442}	—	October 8, 2015	Haleakala	Pan-STARRS 1	·	1.4 km	MPC · JPL
785989	2015 TF_{443}	—	October 10, 2015	Haleakala	Pan-STARRS 1	·	1.0 km	MPC · JPL
785990	2015 TJ_{444}	—	October 10, 2015	Haleakala	Pan-STARRS 1	·	850 m	MPC · JPL
785991	2015 TM_{445}	—	October 13, 2015	Haleakala	Pan-STARRS 1	·	1.2 km	MPC · JPL
785992	2015 TG_{446}	—	October 15, 2015	Mount Lemmon	Mount Lemmon Survey	ADE	1.0 km	MPC · JPL
785993	2015 TL_{446}	—	October 10, 2015	Haleakala	Pan-STARRS 1	·	720 m	MPC · JPL
785994	2015 TQ_{446}	—	October 11, 2015	XuYi	PMO NEO Survey Program	·	990 m	MPC · JPL
785995	2015 TB_{447}	—	October 13, 2015	Catalina	CSS	·	1.1 km	MPC · JPL
785996	2015 TH_{448}	—	October 9, 2015	Haleakala	Pan-STARRS 1	·	1.4 km	MPC · JPL
785997	2015 TN_{448}	—	October 13, 2015	Haleakala	Pan-STARRS 1	HNS	690 m	MPC · JPL
785998	2015 TS_{451}	—	October 12, 2015	Haleakala	Pan-STARRS 1	·	2.1 km	MPC · JPL
785999	2015 TW_{451}	—	October 10, 2015	Haleakala	Pan-STARRS 1	AST	1.4 km	MPC · JPL
786000	2015 TJ_{454}	—	October 9, 2015	Haleakala	Pan-STARRS 1	·	1.2 km	MPC · JPL

back to top

== Meaning of names ==
As minor planet discoveries are confirmed, they are given a permanent number by the IAU's Minor Planet Center (MPC), and the discoverers can then submit names for them, following the IAU's naming conventions. The list below concerns those minor planets in the specified number-range that have received names, and explains the meanings of those names.

Official naming citations of newly named small Solar System bodies are approved and published in a bulletin by IAU's Working Group for Small Bodies Nomenclature (WGSBN). Before May 2021, citations were published in MPC's Minor Planet Circulars for many decades. Recent citations can also be found on the JPL Small-Body Database (SBDB). Until his death in 2016, German astronomer Lutz D. Schmadel compiled these citations into the Dictionary of Minor Planet Names (DMP) and regularly updated the collection.

Based on Paul Herget's The Names of the Minor Planets, Schmadel also researched the unclear origin of numerous asteroids, most of which had been named prior to World War II. This article incorporates text from this source, which is in the public domain: SBDB New namings may only be added to this list below after official publication as the preannouncement of names is condemned. The WGSBN publishes a comprehensive guideline for the naming rules of non-cometary small Solar System bodies.

Named minor planet	Provisional	This minor planet was named for...	Ref · Catalog
785630 Peterbrandt	2015 QR_{24}	Peter Brandt, Danish machinist who worked from 1990 to 2020 as a telescope maintenance technician at the Nordic Optical Telescope (NOT) at the Roque de Los Muchachos Observatory, La Palma island.	IAU · 785630
785648 Likho	2015 RG_{36}	Likho, an embodiment of evil fate and misfortune in Slavic mythology.	IAU · 785648
