= List of minor planets: 752001–753000 =

The following is a partial list of minor planets, running from minor-planet number 752001 through 753000, inclusive. The primary data for this and other partial lists is based on JPL's "Small-Body Orbital Elements" and data available from the Minor Planet Center. Critical list information is also provided by the MPC, unless otherwise specified from Lowell Observatory. A detailed description of the table's columns and additional sources are given on the main page including a complete list of every page in this series, and a statistical break-up on the dynamical classification of minor planets.

Also see the summary list of all named bodies in numerical and alphabetical order, and the corresponding naming citations for the number range of this particular list. New namings may only be added to this list after official publication, as the preannouncement of names is condemned by the Working Group for Small Bodies Nomenclature of the International Astronomical Union.

Near-Earth obj.	MBA (inner)	MBA (outer)	Centaur
Mars-crosser	MBA (middle)	Jupiter trojan	Trans-Neptunian obj.
Unclassified

== 752001–752100 ==
Designation			Discovery			Properties		Ref
Permanent	Provisional	Named after	Date	Site	Discoverer(s)	Category	Diam.	Ref
752001	2015 KY_{108}	—	February 11, 2011	Tenerife	ESA OGS	·	960 m	MPC · JPL
752002	2015 KJ_{109}	—	April 6, 2011	Mount Lemmon	Mount Lemmon Survey	·	1.1 km	MPC · JPL
752003	2015 KW_{109}	—	May 21, 2015	Haleakala	Pan-STARRS 1	·	800 m	MPC · JPL
752004	2015 KM_{110}	—	May 21, 2015	Haleakala	Pan-STARRS 1	·	3.0 km	MPC · JPL
752005	2015 KG_{112}	—	May 21, 2015	Haleakala	Pan-STARRS 1	·	2.1 km	MPC · JPL
752006	2015 KL_{112}	—	February 27, 2009	Catalina	CSS	·	2.3 km	MPC · JPL
752007	2015 KM_{117}	—	May 21, 2015	Haleakala	Pan-STARRS 1	EUN	880 m	MPC · JPL
752008	2015 KW_{118}	—	March 28, 2015	Haleakala	Pan-STARRS 1	·	1.2 km	MPC · JPL
752009	2015 KY_{121}	—	September 23, 2013	Mount Lemmon	Mount Lemmon Survey	H	390 m	MPC · JPL
752010	2015 KQ_{125}	—	March 14, 2011	Mount Lemmon	Mount Lemmon Survey	NYS	940 m	MPC · JPL
752011	2015 KA_{126}	—	April 18, 2015	Kitt Peak	Spacewatch	·	610 m	MPC · JPL
752012	2015 KO_{126}	—	April 15, 2008	Mount Lemmon	Mount Lemmon Survey	·	570 m	MPC · JPL
752013	2015 KR_{126}	—	November 7, 2012	Mount Lemmon	Mount Lemmon Survey	·	1.1 km	MPC · JPL
752014	2015 KF_{128}	—	March 13, 2011	Kitt Peak	Spacewatch	·	1.1 km	MPC · JPL
752015	2015 KO_{128}	—	March 9, 2011	Kitt Peak	Spacewatch	·	970 m	MPC · JPL
752016	2015 KE_{130}	—	May 22, 2015	Haleakala	Pan-STARRS 1	·	1.2 km	MPC · JPL
752017	2015 KX_{132}	—	January 30, 2015	Haleakala	Pan-STARRS 1	·	2.4 km	MPC · JPL
752018	2015 KQ_{133}	—	April 10, 2008	Catalina	CSS	PHO	940 m	MPC · JPL
752019	2015 KL_{134}	—	July 26, 2011	Haleakala	Pan-STARRS 1	·	1.4 km	MPC · JPL
752020	2015 KP_{135}	—	May 10, 2015	Mount Lemmon	Mount Lemmon Survey	MAS	580 m	MPC · JPL
752021	2015 KB_{136}	—	May 11, 2015	Mount Lemmon	Mount Lemmon Survey	·	1.5 km	MPC · JPL
752022	2015 KE_{136}	—	February 13, 2007	Mount Lemmon	Mount Lemmon Survey	NYS	850 m	MPC · JPL
752023	2015 KC_{138}	—	September 2, 2008	Kitt Peak	Spacewatch	MAS	720 m	MPC · JPL
752024	2015 KE_{139}	—	May 31, 2011	Mount Lemmon	Mount Lemmon Survey	·	960 m	MPC · JPL
752025	2015 KU_{139}	—	May 18, 2015	Haleakala	Pan-STARRS 2	·	700 m	MPC · JPL
752026	2015 KX_{140}	—	November 6, 2012	Kitt Peak	Spacewatch	EUN	940 m	MPC · JPL
752027	2015 KH_{141}	—	May 13, 2015	Mount Lemmon	Mount Lemmon Survey	V	500 m	MPC · JPL
752028	2015 KD_{144}	—	May 24, 2011	Haleakala	Pan-STARRS 1	·	1.3 km	MPC · JPL
752029	2015 KP_{144}	—	December 1, 2005	Mount Lemmon	Mount Lemmon Survey	·	1.0 km	MPC · JPL
752030	2015 KE_{146}	—	February 29, 2004	Kitt Peak	Spacewatch	NYS	790 m	MPC · JPL
752031	2015 KN_{148}	—	September 17, 2012	Kitt Peak	Spacewatch	·	610 m	MPC · JPL
752032	2015 KP_{152}	—	October 18, 2012	Piszkés-tető	K. Sárneczky, G. Hodosán	EUN	1.3 km	MPC · JPL
752033	2015 KQ_{154}	—	May 25, 2015	SONEAR	SONEAR	AMO	620 m	MPC · JPL
752034	2015 KE_{155}	—	May 11, 2015	Haleakala	Pan-STARRS 1	·	1.1 km	MPC · JPL
752035	2015 KD_{157}	—	March 21, 2015	Haleakala	Pan-STARRS 1	H	580 m	MPC · JPL
752036	2015 KT_{158}	—	May 26, 2015	Haleakala	Pan-STARRS 1	·	2.0 km	MPC · JPL
752037	2015 KN_{159}	—	September 6, 2012	Haleakala	Pan-STARRS 1	PHO	780 m	MPC · JPL
752038	2015 KJ_{163}	—	February 20, 2012	Haleakala	Pan-STARRS 1	H	430 m	MPC · JPL
752039	2015 KK_{163}	—	February 22, 2001	Kitt Peak	Spacewatch	H	390 m	MPC · JPL
752040	2015 KL_{163}	—	December 30, 2008	Mount Lemmon	Mount Lemmon Survey	H	550 m	MPC · JPL
752041	2015 KM_{163}	—	May 25, 2015	Catalina	CSS	H	470 m	MPC · JPL
752042	2015 KQ_{163}	—	May 20, 2015	Haleakala	Pan-STARRS 1	3:2 · SHU	4.2 km	MPC · JPL
752043	2015 KA_{167}	—	May 26, 2015	Haleakala	Pan-STARRS 1	·	960 m	MPC · JPL
752044	2015 KT_{168}	—	May 18, 2015	Haleakala	Pan-STARRS 2	EUN	730 m	MPC · JPL
752045	2015 KW_{168}	—	May 18, 2015	Haleakala	Pan-STARRS 1	EUN	900 m	MPC · JPL
752046	2015 KR_{169}	—	May 21, 2015	Haleakala	Pan-STARRS 1	·	890 m	MPC · JPL
752047	2015 KG_{170}	—	March 17, 2009	Kitt Peak	Spacewatch	HYG	2.2 km	MPC · JPL
752048	2015 KW_{171}	—	May 26, 2015	Haleakala	Pan-STARRS 1	KON	2.0 km	MPC · JPL
752049	2015 KL_{181}	—	November 23, 2016	Mount Lemmon	Mount Lemmon Survey	·	1.1 km	MPC · JPL
752050	2015 KP_{186}	—	May 25, 2015	Haleakala	Pan-STARRS 1	·	1.0 km	MPC · JPL
752051	2015 KL_{188}	—	May 25, 2015	Haleakala	Pan-STARRS 1	·	570 m	MPC · JPL
752052	2015 KN_{188}	—	May 19, 2015	Haleakala	Pan-STARRS 1	MAR	710 m	MPC · JPL
752053	2015 KO_{189}	—	May 21, 2015	Haleakala	Pan-STARRS 1	·	1.8 km	MPC · JPL
752054	2015 KT_{190}	—	May 26, 2015	Haleakala	Pan-STARRS 1	·	1.9 km	MPC · JPL
752055	2015 KH_{194}	—	May 21, 2015	Haleakala	Pan-STARRS 1	·	2.1 km	MPC · JPL
752056	2015 KS_{194}	—	May 21, 2015	Haleakala	Pan-STARRS 1	·	1.1 km	MPC · JPL
752057	2015 KM_{195}	—	May 19, 2015	Haleakala	Pan-STARRS 1	PHO	670 m	MPC · JPL
752058	2015 KR_{196}	—	May 25, 2015	Mount Lemmon	Mount Lemmon Survey	·	960 m	MPC · JPL
752059	2015 KR_{199}	—	May 12, 2015	Mount Lemmon	Mount Lemmon Survey	·	2.6 km	MPC · JPL
752060	2015 KT_{202}	—	May 30, 2015	Haleakala	Pan-STARRS 1	·	1.6 km	MPC · JPL
752061	2015 KK_{209}	—	May 18, 2015	Haleakala	Pan-STARRS 2	·	780 m	MPC · JPL
752062	2015 KA_{330}	—	May 22, 2015	Haleakala	Pan-STARRS 1	V	500 m	MPC · JPL
752063	2015 LU	—	May 22, 2011	Kitt Peak	Spacewatch	·	1.1 km	MPC · JPL
752064	2015 LV_{3}	—	March 22, 2015	Haleakala	Pan-STARRS 1	·	1.2 km	MPC · JPL
752065	2015 LF_{6}	—	February 11, 2011	Mount Lemmon	Mount Lemmon Survey	·	640 m	MPC · JPL
752066	2015 LX_{7}	—	October 18, 2012	Haleakala	Pan-STARRS 1	·	910 m	MPC · JPL
752067	2015 LH_{8}	—	September 15, 2007	Kitt Peak	Spacewatch	·	1.0 km	MPC · JPL
752068	2015 LB_{9}	—	March 21, 2015	Haleakala	Pan-STARRS 1	·	1.1 km	MPC · JPL
752069	2015 LN_{12}	—	August 27, 2011	Haleakala	Pan-STARRS 1	·	1.4 km	MPC · JPL
752070	2015 LR_{18}	—	March 29, 2008	Kitt Peak	Spacewatch	·	550 m	MPC · JPL
752071	2015 LD_{23}	—	March 10, 2011	Mount Lemmon	Mount Lemmon Survey	ERI	1.3 km	MPC · JPL
752072	2015 LA_{25}	—	November 19, 2008	Catalina	CSS	H	550 m	MPC · JPL
752073	2015 LC_{26}	—	June 13, 2015	Haleakala	Pan-STARRS 1	·	1.4 km	MPC · JPL
752074	2015 LW_{27}	—	September 28, 2003	Kitt Peak	Spacewatch	·	1.1 km	MPC · JPL
752075	2015 LX_{27}	—	January 3, 2014	Kitt Peak	Spacewatch	·	1.1 km	MPC · JPL
752076	2015 LW_{28}	—	June 13, 2015	Haleakala	Pan-STARRS 1	·	940 m	MPC · JPL
752077	2015 LS_{31}	—	November 3, 2005	Catalina	CSS	·	590 m	MPC · JPL
752078	2015 LU_{31}	—	June 13, 2015	Haleakala	Pan-STARRS 1	·	960 m	MPC · JPL
752079	2015 LT_{35}	—	June 21, 2007	Kitt Peak	Spacewatch	·	1.1 km	MPC · JPL
752080	2015 LG_{38}	—	June 15, 2015	Mount Lemmon	Mount Lemmon Survey	·	1.1 km	MPC · JPL
752081	2015 LD_{39}	—	August 28, 2006	Catalina	CSS	·	2.1 km	MPC · JPL
752082	2015 LF_{40}	—	May 19, 2015	Haleakala	Pan-STARRS 1	·	920 m	MPC · JPL
752083	2015 LV_{42}	—	November 7, 2012	Kitt Peak	Spacewatch	EUN	1.0 km	MPC · JPL
752084	2015 LD_{43}	—	June 15, 2015	Haleakala	Pan-STARRS 1	·	1.6 km	MPC · JPL
752085	2015 LL_{45}	—	June 14, 2015	Mount Lemmon	Mount Lemmon Survey	·	2.3 km	MPC · JPL
752086	2015 LB_{46}	—	March 13, 2014	Mount Lemmon	Mount Lemmon Survey	MAR	890 m	MPC · JPL
752087	2015 LD_{46}	—	June 15, 2015	Haleakala	Pan-STARRS 1	·	1.6 km	MPC · JPL
752088	2015 LQ_{47}	—	June 11, 2015	Haleakala	Pan-STARRS 1	H	500 m	MPC · JPL
752089	2015 LE_{48}	—	June 10, 2015	Haleakala	Pan-STARRS 1	JUN	770 m	MPC · JPL
752090	2015 LU_{53}	—	June 13, 2015	Haleakala	Pan-STARRS 1	·	2.3 km	MPC · JPL
752091	2015 LZ_{55}	—	June 12, 2015	Haleakala	Pan-STARRS 1	·	2.9 km	MPC · JPL
752092	2015 LF_{57}	—	September 2, 2010	Mount Lemmon	Mount Lemmon Survey	·	2.0 km	MPC · JPL
752093	2015 LJ_{57}	—	June 15, 2015	Haleakala	Pan-STARRS 1	·	2.0 km	MPC · JPL
752094	2015 LD_{59}	—	June 11, 2015	Haleakala	Pan-STARRS 1	·	800 m	MPC · JPL
752095	2015 MO	—	May 18, 2002	Kitt Peak	Spacewatch	·	1.3 km	MPC · JPL
752096	2015 ML_{3}	—	May 19, 2015	Haleakala	Pan-STARRS 1	EUN	1.1 km	MPC · JPL
752097	2015 MB_{6}	—	June 16, 2015	Haleakala	Pan-STARRS 1	·	1.8 km	MPC · JPL
752098	2015 MS_{7}	—	July 2, 2011	Mount Lemmon	Mount Lemmon Survey	·	980 m	MPC · JPL
752099	2015 MD_{10}	—	June 16, 2015	Haleakala	Pan-STARRS 1	·	1.3 km	MPC · JPL
752100	2015 MS_{10}	—	April 25, 2015	Haleakala	Pan-STARRS 1	JUN	590 m	MPC · JPL

== 752101–752200 ==
back to top

Designation			Discovery			Properties		Ref
Permanent	Provisional	Named after	Date	Site	Discoverer(s)	Category	Diam.	Ref
752101	2015 MS_{11}	—	April 9, 2006	Kitt Peak	Spacewatch	·	1.4 km	MPC · JPL
752102	2015 MX_{11}	—	June 10, 2015	Haleakala	Pan-STARRS 1	EUN	1.0 km	MPC · JPL
752103	2015 MH_{12}	—	November 3, 2004	Kitt Peak	Spacewatch	·	1.0 km	MPC · JPL
752104	2015 MW_{12}	—	March 5, 2011	Catalina	CSS	·	630 m	MPC · JPL
752105	2015 MZ_{12}	—	July 26, 2011	Haleakala	Pan-STARRS 1	HNS	1.0 km	MPC · JPL
752106	2015 MO_{16}	—	October 2, 2008	Mount Lemmon	Mount Lemmon Survey	HNS	860 m	MPC · JPL
752107	2015 ME_{18}	—	May 11, 2015	Mount Lemmon	Mount Lemmon Survey	·	930 m	MPC · JPL
752108	2015 ML_{19}	—	February 8, 2008	Mount Lemmon	Mount Lemmon Survey	·	2.9 km	MPC · JPL
752109	2015 MW_{19}	—	May 15, 2015	Haleakala	Pan-STARRS 1	·	2.5 km	MPC · JPL
752110	2015 MB_{22}	—	April 24, 2015	Kitt Peak	Spacewatch	·	1.3 km	MPC · JPL
752111	2015 MU_{22}	—	June 18, 2015	Haleakala	Pan-STARRS 1	H	380 m	MPC · JPL
752112	2015 ML_{23}	—	February 19, 2014	Mount Lemmon	Mount Lemmon Survey	VER	2.1 km	MPC · JPL
752113	2015 MK_{24}	—	June 18, 2015	Haleakala	Pan-STARRS 1	·	760 m	MPC · JPL
752114	2015 MX_{24}	—	April 23, 2015	Haleakala	Pan-STARRS 2	·	970 m	MPC · JPL
752115	2015 MD_{27}	—	May 12, 2015	Mount Lemmon	Mount Lemmon Survey	·	720 m	MPC · JPL
752116	2015 MH_{28}	—	December 24, 2013	Catalina	CSS	·	2.9 km	MPC · JPL
752117	2015 MK_{35}	—	March 28, 2015	Haleakala	Pan-STARRS 1	KON	1.7 km	MPC · JPL
752118	2015 MV_{37}	—	April 23, 2015	Haleakala	Pan-STARRS 1	T_{j} (2.99) · 3:2	3.4 km	MPC · JPL
752119	2015 MH_{40}	—	September 21, 2003	Kitt Peak	Spacewatch	·	980 m	MPC · JPL
752120	2015 MJ_{40}	—	February 9, 2014	Kitt Peak	Spacewatch	EUN	990 m	MPC · JPL
752121	2015 MP_{41}	—	January 28, 2014	Mount Lemmon	Mount Lemmon Survey	·	2.4 km	MPC · JPL
752122	2015 MR_{45}	—	June 17, 2015	Haleakala	Pan-STARRS 1	JUN	780 m	MPC · JPL
752123	2015 MY_{45}	—	June 17, 2015	Haleakala	Pan-STARRS 1	EUN	1.0 km	MPC · JPL
752124	2015 MB_{46}	—	September 24, 2011	Haleakala	Pan-STARRS 1	·	1.4 km	MPC · JPL
752125	2015 MD_{47}	—	June 17, 2015	Haleakala	Pan-STARRS 1	EUN	1.0 km	MPC · JPL
752126	2015 MN_{57}	—	June 13, 2015	Haleakala	Pan-STARRS 1	·	2.2 km	MPC · JPL
752127	2015 MD_{59}	—	June 20, 2015	Haleakala	Pan-STARRS 1	·	520 m	MPC · JPL
752128	2015 MP_{61}	—	August 30, 2011	Piszkés-tető	K. Sárneczky, S. Kürti	·	1.6 km	MPC · JPL
752129	2015 MT_{65}	—	April 12, 2002	Kitt Peak	Spacewatch	·	890 m	MPC · JPL
752130	2015 MR_{66}	—	March 31, 2015	Haleakala	Pan-STARRS 1	·	820 m	MPC · JPL
752131	2015 MK_{67}	—	June 11, 2015	Haleakala	Pan-STARRS 2	·	1.7 km	MPC · JPL
752132	2015 MT_{67}	—	June 12, 2015	Mount Lemmon	Mount Lemmon Survey	HNS	1.2 km	MPC · JPL
752133	2015 MA_{68}	—	July 28, 2003	Palomar	NEAT	·	1.0 km	MPC · JPL
752134	2015 MN_{72}	—	June 16, 2015	Haleakala	Pan-STARRS 1	EUN	1.2 km	MPC · JPL
752135	2015 MK_{74}	—	March 24, 2011	Kitt Peak	Spacewatch	·	610 m	MPC · JPL
752136	2015 MD_{75}	—	August 27, 2011	Haleakala	Pan-STARRS 1	·	1.1 km	MPC · JPL
752137	2015 MC_{76}	—	September 26, 2011	Haleakala	Pan-STARRS 1	RAF	690 m	MPC · JPL
752138	2015 MG_{77}	—	October 21, 2003	Palomar	NEAT	MAR	1.3 km	MPC · JPL
752139	2015 MM_{77}	—	August 22, 2006	Palomar	NEAT	·	1.9 km	MPC · JPL
752140	2015 MX_{77}	—	June 13, 2015	Mount Lemmon	Mount Lemmon Survey	·	1.7 km	MPC · JPL
752141	2015 MJ_{78}	—	April 24, 2007	Kitt Peak	Spacewatch	·	970 m	MPC · JPL
752142	2015 MS_{80}	—	June 13, 2015	Mount Lemmon	Mount Lemmon Survey	·	1.5 km	MPC · JPL
752143	2015 MD_{82}	—	July 1, 2011	Kitt Peak	Spacewatch	·	1.2 km	MPC · JPL
752144	2015 MF_{83}	—	June 18, 2015	Haleakala	Pan-STARRS 1	MAR	890 m	MPC · JPL
752145	2015 MK_{83}	—	November 16, 2003	Kitt Peak	Spacewatch	·	1.3 km	MPC · JPL
752146	2015 MR_{85}	—	June 22, 2015	Haleakala	Pan-STARRS 1	·	1.3 km	MPC · JPL
752147	2015 MT_{85}	—	June 18, 2015	Haleakala	Pan-STARRS 1	·	1.0 km	MPC · JPL
752148	2015 MX_{85}	—	August 23, 2011	Haleakala	Pan-STARRS 1	·	900 m	MPC · JPL
752149	2015 MU_{89}	—	October 15, 2007	Kitt Peak	Spacewatch	MAR	760 m	MPC · JPL
752150	2015 MW_{89}	—	June 15, 2015	Haleakala	Pan-STARRS 1	·	1.2 km	MPC · JPL
752151	2015 MD_{90}	—	September 14, 2007	Catalina	CSS	·	1.1 km	MPC · JPL
752152	2015 ME_{91}	—	June 21, 2015	Haleakala	Pan-STARRS 1	·	1.3 km	MPC · JPL
752153	2015 MU_{93}	—	June 21, 2011	Kitt Peak	Spacewatch	·	900 m	MPC · JPL
752154	2015 MK_{94}	—	November 14, 2010	Kitt Peak	Spacewatch	H	420 m	MPC · JPL
752155	2015 MN_{94}	—	June 22, 2011	Kitt Peak	Spacewatch	·	1.4 km	MPC · JPL
752156	2015 MT_{94}	—	June 23, 2015	Haleakala	Pan-STARRS 1	·	1.1 km	MPC · JPL
752157	2015 MR_{95}	—	June 20, 2015	Haleakala	Pan-STARRS 1	·	2.8 km	MPC · JPL
752158	2015 MY_{97}	—	October 20, 2012	Haleakala	Pan-STARRS 1	·	840 m	MPC · JPL
752159	2015 MK_{98}	—	November 12, 2012	Mount Lemmon	Mount Lemmon Survey	·	1.3 km	MPC · JPL
752160	2015 MA_{100}	—	January 16, 2013	Haleakala	Pan-STARRS 1	·	1.4 km	MPC · JPL
752161	2015 MG_{100}	—	May 2, 2006	Kitt Peak	Spacewatch	·	1.1 km	MPC · JPL
752162	2015 ME_{104}	—	June 26, 2015	Haleakala	Pan-STARRS 1	EUN	1.0 km	MPC · JPL
752163	2015 MA_{107}	—	August 29, 2006	Kitt Peak	Spacewatch	·	1.4 km	MPC · JPL
752164	2015 MG_{107}	—	June 26, 2015	Haleakala	Pan-STARRS 1	·	1.1 km	MPC · JPL
752165	2015 MZ_{113}	—	July 3, 2011	Mount Lemmon	Mount Lemmon Survey	·	1.3 km	MPC · JPL
752166	2015 MA_{114}	—	April 5, 2014	Haleakala	Pan-STARRS 1	EUN	1.1 km	MPC · JPL
752167	2015 MP_{115}	—	February 6, 2014	Mount Lemmon	Mount Lemmon Survey	JUN	830 m	MPC · JPL
752168	2015 MA_{119}	—	June 27, 2015	Haleakala	Pan-STARRS 1	·	1.2 km	MPC · JPL
752169	2015 MV_{120}	—	July 21, 2002	Palomar	NEAT	(1547)	1.4 km	MPC · JPL
752170	2015 MD_{121}	—	June 27, 2015	Haleakala	Pan-STARRS 1	·	1.3 km	MPC · JPL
752171	2015 MG_{121}	—	August 29, 2006	Kitt Peak	Spacewatch	·	1.1 km	MPC · JPL
752172	2015 MS_{124}	—	June 28, 2015	Haleakala	Pan-STARRS 1	EUN	920 m	MPC · JPL
752173	2015 MJ_{126}	—	October 13, 2010	Catalina	CSS	·	2.3 km	MPC · JPL
752174	2015 MN_{126}	—	October 3, 2011	XuYi	PMO NEO Survey Program	·	1.3 km	MPC · JPL
752175	2015 MG_{127}	—	September 28, 2011	Kitt Peak	Spacewatch	·	1.3 km	MPC · JPL
752176	2015 MX_{127}	—	June 29, 2015	Haleakala	Pan-STARRS 1	·	1.3 km	MPC · JPL
752177	2015 MD_{128}	—	December 30, 1999	Mauna Kea	C. Veillet, I. Gable	(194)	1.5 km	MPC · JPL
752178	2015 MJ_{129}	—	June 27, 2015	Haleakala	Pan-STARRS 2	·	670 m	MPC · JPL
752179	2015 MW_{133}	—	June 29, 2015	Haleakala	Pan-STARRS 1	·	1.4 km	MPC · JPL
752180	2015 MX_{133}	—	June 29, 2015	Haleakala	Pan-STARRS 1	JUN	1.1 km	MPC · JPL
752181	2015 ML_{134}	—	June 16, 2015	Haleakala	Pan-STARRS 1	·	1.9 km	MPC · JPL
752182	2015 MU_{134}	—	October 4, 2005	Mount Lemmon	Mount Lemmon Survey	·	1.3 km	MPC · JPL
752183	2015 MR_{136}	—	June 15, 2015	Haleakala	Pan-STARRS 1	·	1.1 km	MPC · JPL
752184	2015 MW_{136}	—	January 18, 2013	Haleakala	Pan-STARRS 1	EUN	1.2 km	MPC · JPL
752185	2015 MY_{138}	—	June 26, 2015	Haleakala	Pan-STARRS 1	·	1.0 km	MPC · JPL
752186	2015 MF_{139}	—	September 18, 2003	Kitt Peak	Spacewatch	·	1.0 km	MPC · JPL
752187	2015 MN_{139}	—	November 13, 2012	Kitt Peak	Spacewatch	·	1.1 km	MPC · JPL
752188	2015 MC_{140}	—	September 23, 2011	Haleakala	Pan-STARRS 1	·	1.3 km	MPC · JPL
752189	2015 MQ_{142}	—	December 30, 2007	Kitt Peak	Spacewatch	·	1.4 km	MPC · JPL
752190	2015 MC_{143}	—	October 8, 2007	Kitt Peak	Spacewatch	·	1.3 km	MPC · JPL
752191	2015 ME_{143}	—	September 24, 2011	Mount Lemmon	Mount Lemmon Survey	·	1.6 km	MPC · JPL
752192	2015 MH_{143}	—	June 22, 2015	Haleakala	Pan-STARRS 1	·	1.1 km	MPC · JPL
752193	2015 MQ_{143}	—	October 11, 2007	Kitt Peak	Spacewatch	·	1.2 km	MPC · JPL
752194	2015 MD_{144}	—	August 19, 2006	Kitt Peak	Spacewatch	·	1.4 km	MPC · JPL
752195	2015 MJ_{144}	—	October 30, 2005	Mount Lemmon	Mount Lemmon Survey	EOS	1.6 km	MPC · JPL
752196	2015 MZ_{144}	—	January 18, 2013	Kitt Peak	Spacewatch	·	1.5 km	MPC · JPL
752197	2015 MB_{145}	—	June 25, 2015	Haleakala	Pan-STARRS 1	·	1.1 km	MPC · JPL
752198	2015 MD_{145}	—	September 28, 2011	Mount Lemmon	Mount Lemmon Survey	·	1.3 km	MPC · JPL
752199	2015 ML_{145}	—	June 26, 2015	Haleakala	Pan-STARRS 1	·	1.3 km	MPC · JPL
752200	2015 ME_{147}	—	September 23, 2011	Kitt Peak	Spacewatch	EUN	1.0 km	MPC · JPL

== 752201–752300 ==
back to top

Designation			Discovery			Properties		Ref
Permanent	Provisional	Named after	Date	Site	Discoverer(s)	Category	Diam.	Ref
752201	2015 MJ_{148}	—	May 4, 2014	Haleakala	Pan-STARRS 1	·	1.4 km	MPC · JPL
752202	2015 MR_{148}	—	April 5, 2014	Haleakala	Pan-STARRS 1	·	1.0 km	MPC · JPL
752203	2015 MZ_{148}	—	April 23, 2014	Mount Lemmon	Mount Lemmon Survey	·	1.1 km	MPC · JPL
752204	2015 MK_{149}	—	June 28, 2015	Haleakala	Pan-STARRS 1	·	880 m	MPC · JPL
752205	2015 MD_{151}	—	June 17, 2015	Haleakala	Pan-STARRS 1	·	1.1 km	MPC · JPL
752206	2015 MA_{154}	—	June 17, 2015	Haleakala	Pan-STARRS 1	·	710 m	MPC · JPL
752207	2015 ME_{157}	—	October 22, 2003	Apache Point	SDSS	·	1.1 km	MPC · JPL
752208	2015 MW_{169}	—	June 24, 2015	Haleakala	Pan-STARRS 1	·	790 m	MPC · JPL
752209	2015 MT_{171}	—	June 26, 2015	Haleakala	Pan-STARRS 1	·	1.2 km	MPC · JPL
752210	2015 MG_{173}	—	June 17, 2015	Haleakala	Pan-STARRS 1	·	1.1 km	MPC · JPL
752211	2015 MM_{175}	—	June 16, 2015	Haleakala	Pan-STARRS 1	·	1.3 km	MPC · JPL
752212	2015 MN_{176}	—	June 20, 2015	Haleakala	Pan-STARRS 1	·	1.1 km	MPC · JPL
752213	2015 NR	—	March 28, 2015	Haleakala	Pan-STARRS 1	EUN	870 m	MPC · JPL
752214	2015 NL_{1}	—	October 8, 2012	Haleakala	Pan-STARRS 1	·	1.2 km	MPC · JPL
752215	2015 NU_{1}	—	June 14, 2011	Mount Lemmon	Mount Lemmon Survey	·	1.0 km	MPC · JPL
752216	2015 NW_{1}	—	April 18, 2015	Haleakala	Pan-STARRS 1	·	1.0 km	MPC · JPL
752217	2015 NN_{3}	—	September 15, 2007	Kitt Peak	Spacewatch	·	1.2 km	MPC · JPL
752218	2015 NZ_{4}	—	July 8, 2015	Elena Remote	Oreshko, A.	·	1.1 km	MPC · JPL
752219	2015 ND_{5}	—	September 11, 2004	Kitt Peak	Spacewatch	MAS	570 m	MPC · JPL
752220	2015 NQ_{5}	—	June 26, 2011	Mount Lemmon	Mount Lemmon Survey	·	1.2 km	MPC · JPL
752221	2015 NK_{7}	—	July 9, 2015	Haleakala	Pan-STARRS 1	·	1.1 km	MPC · JPL
752222	2015 NN_{8}	—	June 18, 2015	Haleakala	Pan-STARRS 1	·	610 m	MPC · JPL
752223	2015 NL_{9}	—	June 26, 2015	Haleakala	Pan-STARRS 1	·	1.1 km	MPC · JPL
752224	2015 NB_{13}	—	September 28, 2003	Kitt Peak	Spacewatch	·	940 m	MPC · JPL
752225	2015 ND_{17}	—	July 12, 2015	Haleakala	Pan-STARRS 1	H	400 m	MPC · JPL
752226	2015 NR_{17}	—	January 22, 2006	Mount Lemmon	Mount Lemmon Survey	H	440 m	MPC · JPL
752227	2015 NJ_{21}	—	April 18, 2015	Haleakala	Pan-STARRS 1	T_{j} (2.95)	3.0 km	MPC · JPL
752228	2015 NJ_{23}	—	October 14, 2007	Mount Lemmon	Mount Lemmon Survey	EUN	890 m	MPC · JPL
752229	2015 NL_{24}	—	May 29, 2011	Mount Lemmon	Mount Lemmon Survey	·	860 m	MPC · JPL
752230	2015 NF_{25}	—	December 8, 2012	Mount Lemmon	Mount Lemmon Survey	·	1.7 km	MPC · JPL
752231	2015 ND_{28}	—	September 28, 2011	Mount Lemmon	Mount Lemmon Survey	·	1.2 km	MPC · JPL
752232	2015 NW_{31}	—	July 8, 2015	Haleakala	Pan-STARRS 1	·	1.6 km	MPC · JPL
752233	2015 NE_{32}	—	July 7, 2015	Haleakala	Pan-STARRS 1	·	2.5 km	MPC · JPL
752234	2015 NW_{32}	—	July 12, 2015	Haleakala	Pan-STARRS 1	·	1.3 km	MPC · JPL
752235	2015 NL_{33}	—	July 12, 2015	Haleakala	Pan-STARRS 1	·	1.4 km	MPC · JPL
752236	2015 NJ_{34}	—	July 14, 2015	Haleakala	Pan-STARRS 1	·	1.4 km	MPC · JPL
752237	2015 NN_{34}	—	July 12, 2015	Haleakala	Pan-STARRS 1	EUN	950 m	MPC · JPL
752238	2015 OS	—	October 31, 1999	Socorro	LINEAR	T_{j} (2.94)	2.2 km	MPC · JPL
752239	2015 OM_{1}	—	March 20, 2010	Kitt Peak	Spacewatch	(5)	1.1 km	MPC · JPL
752240	2015 OU_{1}	—	July 8, 2015	Mount Lemmon	Mount Lemmon Survey	·	1.5 km	MPC · JPL
752241	2015 OQ_{2}	—	July 8, 2015	Haleakala	Pan-STARRS 1	·	1.1 km	MPC · JPL
752242	2015 OT_{2}	—	September 18, 2011	Mount Lemmon	Mount Lemmon Survey	·	1.2 km	MPC · JPL
752243	2015 OV_{5}	—	May 7, 2014	Haleakala	Pan-STARRS 1	·	1.3 km	MPC · JPL
752244	2015 OQ_{11}	—	May 4, 2014	Haleakala	Pan-STARRS 1	·	1.9 km	MPC · JPL
752245	2015 OL_{12}	—	July 18, 2015	Haleakala	Pan-STARRS 1	EUN	750 m	MPC · JPL
752246	2015 OZ_{12}	—	February 26, 2014	Haleakala	Pan-STARRS 1	·	1.0 km	MPC · JPL
752247	2015 OD_{14}	—	March 6, 2011	Kitt Peak	Spacewatch	(2076)	580 m	MPC · JPL
752248	2015 OA_{15}	—	June 30, 2015	Haleakala	Pan-STARRS 1	·	1.2 km	MPC · JPL
752249	2015 OG_{15}	—	July 18, 2015	Haleakala	Pan-STARRS 1	·	2.0 km	MPC · JPL
752250	2015 OZ_{15}	—	October 1, 2011	Westfield	R. Holmes	·	1.4 km	MPC · JPL
752251	2015 OF_{18}	—	July 18, 2015	Haleakala	Pan-STARRS 1	·	1.2 km	MPC · JPL
752252	2015 OS_{18}	—	February 10, 2014	Haleakala	Pan-STARRS 1	3:2	4.4 km	MPC · JPL
752253	2015 OT_{19}	—	June 16, 2010	Mount Lemmon	Mount Lemmon Survey	·	1.6 km	MPC · JPL
752254	2015 OU_{19}	—	July 18, 2015	Haleakala	Pan-STARRS 1	·	1.4 km	MPC · JPL
752255	2015 OX_{19}	—	July 18, 2015	Haleakala	Pan-STARRS 1	·	1.1 km	MPC · JPL
752256	2015 OG_{21}	—	September 18, 2011	La Sagra	OAM	JUN	990 m	MPC · JPL
752257	2015 OH_{21}	—	July 19, 2015	Elena Remote	Oreshko, A.	·	2.3 km	MPC · JPL
752258	2015 OM_{22}	—	April 30, 2014	Haleakala	Pan-STARRS 1	·	4.4 km	MPC · JPL
752259	2015 OQ_{22}	—	September 30, 2005	Mount Lemmon	Mount Lemmon Survey	·	580 m	MPC · JPL
752260	2015 OH_{23}	—	August 15, 2006	Palomar	NEAT	·	1.4 km	MPC · JPL
752261	2015 OK_{23}	—	November 9, 2007	Mount Lemmon	Mount Lemmon Survey	·	1.4 km	MPC · JPL
752262	2015 OA_{24}	—	June 29, 2015	Haleakala	Pan-STARRS 1	·	1.3 km	MPC · JPL
752263 Franciscosánchez	2015 OU_{26}	Franciscosánchez	July 18, 2015	Teide	M. Serra-Ricart, S. Bossa	·	1.8 km	MPC · JPL
752264	2015 OH_{27}	—	August 28, 2006	Catalina	CSS	·	1.2 km	MPC · JPL
752265	2015 OS_{27}	—	July 23, 2015	Haleakala	Pan-STARRS 1	·	1.4 km	MPC · JPL
752266	2015 OO_{28}	—	October 4, 2002	Anderson Mesa	LONEOS	·	1.4 km	MPC · JPL
752267	2015 OB_{29}	—	August 19, 2006	Kitt Peak	Spacewatch	·	1.4 km	MPC · JPL
752268	2015 OE_{29}	—	February 28, 2008	Kitt Peak	Spacewatch	·	2.0 km	MPC · JPL
752269	2015 OL_{29}	—	September 27, 2011	Mount Lemmon	Mount Lemmon Survey	·	1.3 km	MPC · JPL
752270	2015 OY_{29}	—	November 13, 2002	Palomar	NEAT	·	970 m	MPC · JPL
752271	2015 OB_{32}	—	May 21, 2006	Kitt Peak	Spacewatch	·	1.1 km	MPC · JPL
752272	2015 OQ_{32}	—	December 15, 2012	Tenerife	ESA OGS	V	700 m	MPC · JPL
752273	2015 OC_{35}	—	December 3, 2007	Kitt Peak	Spacewatch	JUN	910 m	MPC · JPL
752274	2015 OP_{36}	—	October 25, 2011	Haleakala	Pan-STARRS 1	·	1.0 km	MPC · JPL
752275	2015 OS_{38}	—	July 18, 2006	Mount Lemmon	Mount Lemmon Survey	·	1.4 km	MPC · JPL
752276	2015 OX_{40}	—	July 31, 2011	Haleakala	Pan-STARRS 1	NYS	1.1 km	MPC · JPL
752277	2015 OE_{41}	—	October 25, 2011	Haleakala	Pan-STARRS 1	·	1.3 km	MPC · JPL
752278	2015 OO_{42}	—	June 20, 2015	Haleakala	Pan-STARRS 1	·	1.7 km	MPC · JPL
752279	2015 OS_{42}	—	April 13, 2011	Mount Lemmon	Mount Lemmon Survey	·	960 m	MPC · JPL
752280	2015 OZ_{42}	—	July 24, 2015	Haleakala	Pan-STARRS 1	PHO	980 m	MPC · JPL
752281	2015 OV_{44}	—	September 17, 2012	Mount Lemmon	Mount Lemmon Survey	·	720 m	MPC · JPL
752282	2015 OK_{48}	—	July 26, 2015	Haleakala	Pan-STARRS 1	·	2.3 km	MPC · JPL
752283	2015 OP_{50}	—	September 21, 2011	Haleakala	Pan-STARRS 1	MAR	890 m	MPC · JPL
752284	2015 OE_{52}	—	May 2, 2006	Mount Lemmon	Mount Lemmon Survey	·	1.1 km	MPC · JPL
752285	2015 OB_{56}	—	March 11, 2014	Mount Lemmon	Mount Lemmon Survey	EUN	830 m	MPC · JPL
752286	2015 OC_{58}	—	July 26, 2015	Haleakala	Pan-STARRS 1	MAR	780 m	MPC · JPL
752287	2015 OB_{59}	—	June 17, 2015	Haleakala	Pan-STARRS 1	·	1.8 km	MPC · JPL
752288	2015 OV_{64}	—	April 8, 2014	Mount Lemmon	Mount Lemmon Survey	·	1.7 km	MPC · JPL
752289	2015 OD_{65}	—	July 19, 2015	Haleakala	Pan-STARRS 1	·	1.7 km	MPC · JPL
752290	2015 OX_{66}	—	January 17, 2013	Haleakala	Pan-STARRS 1	·	1.4 km	MPC · JPL
752291	2015 OO_{67}	—	June 28, 2015	Haleakala	Pan-STARRS 1	PHO	930 m	MPC · JPL
752292	2015 OM_{70}	—	July 9, 2015	Haleakala	Pan-STARRS 1	·	1.1 km	MPC · JPL
752293	2015 OX_{70}	—	November 2, 2011	Kitt Peak	Spacewatch	AEO	890 m	MPC · JPL
752294	2015 OJ_{75}	—	February 22, 2014	Mount Lemmon	Mount Lemmon Survey	H	550 m	MPC · JPL
752295	2015 OR_{75}	—	February 2, 2009	Kitt Peak	Spacewatch	MAR	1.0 km	MPC · JPL
752296	2015 OX_{78}	—	July 26, 2015	Haleakala	Pan-STARRS 1	APO	380 m	MPC · JPL
752297	2015 OZ_{79}	—	January 29, 2014	Mount Lemmon	Mount Lemmon Survey	H	490 m	MPC · JPL
752298	2015 OT_{81}	—	July 19, 2015	Haleakala	Pan-STARRS 1	·	1.7 km	MPC · JPL
752299	2015 OZ_{83}	—	July 27, 2015	Haleakala	Pan-STARRS 2	·	1.4 km	MPC · JPL
752300	2015 OH_{84}	—	July 28, 2015	Haleakala	Pan-STARRS 2	·	1.6 km	MPC · JPL

== 752301–752400 ==
back to top

Designation			Discovery			Properties		Ref
Permanent	Provisional	Named after	Date	Site	Discoverer(s)	Category	Diam.	Ref
752301	2015 OL_{84}	—	September 20, 2001	Socorro	LINEAR	·	1.8 km	MPC · JPL
752302	2015 OB_{86}	—	July 23, 2015	Haleakala	Pan-STARRS 1	·	1.5 km	MPC · JPL
752303	2015 OT_{87}	—	November 12, 2007	Mount Lemmon	Mount Lemmon Survey	·	1.2 km	MPC · JPL
752304	2015 OQ_{89}	—	October 18, 2011	Mount Lemmon	Mount Lemmon Survey	·	1.6 km	MPC · JPL
752305	2015 ON_{90}	—	July 27, 2015	Haleakala	Pan-STARRS 1	·	1.2 km	MPC · JPL
752306	2015 OH_{91}	—	July 18, 2015	Haleakala	Pan-STARRS 1	·	1.6 km	MPC · JPL
752307	2015 OL_{91}	—	July 18, 2015	Haleakala	Pan-STARRS 1	·	1.3 km	MPC · JPL
752308	2015 OK_{93}	—	May 7, 2014	Haleakala	Pan-STARRS 1	·	970 m	MPC · JPL
752309	2015 OL_{95}	—	October 24, 2011	Haleakala	Pan-STARRS 1	·	1.3 km	MPC · JPL
752310	2015 OB_{96}	—	July 23, 2015	Haleakala	Pan-STARRS 1	EUN	1.0 km	MPC · JPL
752311	2015 OS_{96}	—	July 23, 2015	Haleakala	Pan-STARRS 1	·	1.9 km	MPC · JPL
752312	2015 OU_{96}	—	November 30, 2011	Kitt Peak	Spacewatch	·	1.4 km	MPC · JPL
752313	2015 OQ_{98}	—	March 10, 2014	Mount Lemmon	Mount Lemmon Survey	·	1.1 km	MPC · JPL
752314	2015 OM_{99}	—	October 9, 2007	Kitt Peak	Spacewatch	·	1.1 km	MPC · JPL
752315	2015 OU_{99}	—	July 25, 2015	Haleakala	Pan-STARRS 1	·	1.7 km	MPC · JPL
752316	2015 OY_{100}	—	July 25, 2015	Haleakala	Pan-STARRS 1	·	1.1 km	MPC · JPL
752317	2015 OV_{101}	—	May 7, 2014	Haleakala	Pan-STARRS 1	BRA	1.1 km	MPC · JPL
752318	2015 OO_{102}	—	July 25, 2015	Haleakala	Pan-STARRS 1	·	2.4 km	MPC · JPL
752319	2015 OW_{102}	—	July 25, 2015	Haleakala	Pan-STARRS 1	·	1.5 km	MPC · JPL
752320	2015 OG_{103}	—	January 20, 2013	Kitt Peak	Spacewatch	·	1.5 km	MPC · JPL
752321	2015 ON_{103}	—	August 29, 2006	Kitt Peak	Spacewatch	AEO	800 m	MPC · JPL
752322	2015 OV_{103}	—	October 11, 2006	Palomar	NEAT	·	2.0 km	MPC · JPL
752323	2015 OZ_{103}	—	July 26, 2015	Haleakala	Pan-STARRS 1	MAR	1.4 km	MPC · JPL
752324	2015 OD_{104}	—	February 15, 2013	Haleakala	Pan-STARRS 1	·	1.5 km	MPC · JPL
752325	2015 ON_{104}	—	August 17, 2006	Palomar	NEAT	MRX	870 m	MPC · JPL
752326	2015 OV_{105}	—	November 1, 2002	Palomar	NEAT	JUN	880 m	MPC · JPL
752327	2015 OT_{106}	—	July 19, 2015	Haleakala	Pan-STARRS 1	MAR	1.1 km	MPC · JPL
752328	2015 OF_{107}	—	July 25, 2015	Haleakala	Pan-STARRS 1	EUN	940 m	MPC · JPL
752329	2015 OC_{108}	—	March 20, 2010	Siding Spring	SSS	·	1.3 km	MPC · JPL
752330	2015 OL_{112}	—	July 19, 2015	Haleakala	Pan-STARRS 1	·	1.2 km	MPC · JPL
752331	2015 OJ_{114}	—	July 23, 2015	Haleakala	Pan-STARRS 1	CLO	1.5 km	MPC · JPL
752332	2015 OP_{119}	—	June 27, 2015	Haleakala	Pan-STARRS 2	·	1.1 km	MPC · JPL
752333	2015 OZ_{123}	—	July 25, 2015	Haleakala	Pan-STARRS 1	MAR	930 m	MPC · JPL
752334	2015 OE_{124}	—	July 24, 2015	Haleakala	Pan-STARRS 1	·	1.3 km	MPC · JPL
752335	2015 OJ_{124}	—	July 24, 2015	Haleakala	Pan-STARRS 1	·	1.4 km	MPC · JPL
752336	2015 OL_{129}	—	July 25, 2015	Haleakala	Pan-STARRS 1	EOS	1.9 km	MPC · JPL
752337	2015 OD_{133}	—	July 25, 2015	Haleakala	Pan-STARRS 1	HOF	2.0 km	MPC · JPL
752338	2015 ON_{136}	—	July 24, 2015	Haleakala	Pan-STARRS 1	·	1.4 km	MPC · JPL
752339	2015 OS_{136}	—	April 5, 2014	Haleakala	Pan-STARRS 1	NEM	1.8 km	MPC · JPL
752340	2015 OE_{137}	—	July 25, 2015	Haleakala	Pan-STARRS 1	EUN	820 m	MPC · JPL
752341	2015 OQ_{137}	—	July 24, 2015	Haleakala	Pan-STARRS 1	·	1.4 km	MPC · JPL
752342	2015 OA_{139}	—	July 24, 2015	Haleakala	Pan-STARRS 1	·	1.2 km	MPC · JPL
752343	2015 OW_{139}	—	July 26, 2015	Haleakala	Pan-STARRS 1	·	1.3 km	MPC · JPL
752344	2015 OB_{141}	—	July 25, 2015	Haleakala	Pan-STARRS 1	·	1.3 km	MPC · JPL
752345	2015 OF_{141}	—	July 28, 2015	Haleakala	Pan-STARRS 1	·	980 m	MPC · JPL
752346	2015 PY_{1}	—	November 6, 2008	Mount Lemmon	Mount Lemmon Survey	·	1.1 km	MPC · JPL
752347	2015 PS_{6}	—	May 15, 2015	Haleakala	Pan-STARRS 1	·	1.3 km	MPC · JPL
752348	2015 PN_{7}	—	September 9, 2007	Mount Lemmon	Mount Lemmon Survey	·	1.1 km	MPC · JPL
752349	2015 PC_{14}	—	October 6, 2008	Kitt Peak	Spacewatch	·	1.2 km	MPC · JPL
752350	2015 PT_{16}	—	January 29, 2009	Mount Lemmon	Mount Lemmon Survey	·	1.0 km	MPC · JPL
752351	2015 PN_{24}	—	September 29, 2011	Kitt Peak	Spacewatch	·	1.3 km	MPC · JPL
752352	2015 PZ_{24}	—	August 27, 2011	Haleakala	Pan-STARRS 1	·	1.1 km	MPC · JPL
752353	2015 PZ_{29}	—	June 27, 2015	Haleakala	Pan-STARRS 1	·	1.0 km	MPC · JPL
752354	2015 PJ_{32}	—	July 26, 2015	Haleakala	Pan-STARRS 1	615	1.1 km	MPC · JPL
752355	2015 PX_{32}	—	November 2, 2011	Mount Lemmon	Mount Lemmon Survey	·	1.9 km	MPC · JPL
752356	2015 PY_{32}	—	September 20, 2011	Haleakala	Pan-STARRS 1	·	1.7 km	MPC · JPL
752357	2015 PD_{34}	—	April 5, 2014	Haleakala	Pan-STARRS 1	·	970 m	MPC · JPL
752358	2015 PM_{34}	—	May 6, 2006	Mount Lemmon	Mount Lemmon Survey	·	1.6 km	MPC · JPL
752359	2015 PM_{35}	—	October 15, 2004	Mount Lemmon	Mount Lemmon Survey	·	1.0 km	MPC · JPL
752360	2015 PR_{35}	—	September 26, 2007	Mount Lemmon	Mount Lemmon Survey	(5)	870 m	MPC · JPL
752361	2015 PF_{37}	—	October 29, 2005	Mount Lemmon	Mount Lemmon Survey	·	800 m	MPC · JPL
752362	2015 PR_{37}	—	January 20, 2013	Kitt Peak	Spacewatch	·	1.5 km	MPC · JPL
752363	2015 PM_{38}	—	January 6, 2013	Kitt Peak	Spacewatch	·	890 m	MPC · JPL
752364	2015 PN_{38}	—	September 26, 2011	Kitt Peak	Spacewatch	·	1.3 km	MPC · JPL
752365	2015 PD_{40}	—	October 30, 2005	Kitt Peak	Spacewatch	·	600 m	MPC · JPL
752366	2015 PE_{41}	—	July 24, 2015	Haleakala	Pan-STARRS 1	EUN	820 m	MPC · JPL
752367	2015 PP_{42}	—	September 24, 2011	Haleakala	Pan-STARRS 1	·	1.4 km	MPC · JPL
752368	2015 PU_{43}	—	August 1, 2011	Haleakala	Pan-STARRS 1	·	890 m	MPC · JPL
752369	2015 PW_{44}	—	April 2, 2014	Mount Lemmon	Mount Lemmon Survey	EUN	920 m	MPC · JPL
752370	2015 PW_{45}	—	October 30, 2011	Kitt Peak	Spacewatch	·	1.2 km	MPC · JPL
752371	2015 PJ_{47}	—	June 25, 2015	Haleakala	Pan-STARRS 1	·	1.3 km	MPC · JPL
752372	2015 PD_{48}	—	August 9, 2015	Haleakala	Pan-STARRS 1	·	1.4 km	MPC · JPL
752373	2015 PZ_{49}	—	April 8, 2010	Kitt Peak	Spacewatch	·	1.0 km	MPC · JPL
752374	2015 PL_{50}	—	October 22, 2012	Haleakala	Pan-STARRS 1	·	580 m	MPC · JPL
752375	2015 PN_{50}	—	July 24, 2015	Haleakala	Pan-STARRS 1	·	1.2 km	MPC · JPL
752376	2015 PE_{54}	—	May 22, 2014	Mount Lemmon	Mount Lemmon Survey	·	1.7 km	MPC · JPL
752377	2015 PA_{59}	—	March 13, 2011	Kitt Peak	Spacewatch	·	690 m	MPC · JPL
752378	2015 PB_{59}	—	December 25, 2005	Kitt Peak	Spacewatch	·	1.0 km	MPC · JPL
752379	2015 PP_{63}	—	December 7, 2012	Haleakala	Pan-STARRS 1	KRM	1.7 km	MPC · JPL
752380	2015 PW_{64}	—	September 29, 2011	Mount Lemmon	Mount Lemmon Survey	ADE	1.3 km	MPC · JPL
752381	2015 PF_{67}	—	June 28, 2015	Haleakala	Pan-STARRS 1	·	1.2 km	MPC · JPL
752382	2015 PS_{67}	—	June 28, 2015	Haleakala	Pan-STARRS 1	·	1.2 km	MPC · JPL
752383	2015 PG_{74}	—	March 31, 2003	Apache Point	SDSS	PHO	680 m	MPC · JPL
752384	2015 PO_{78}	—	April 5, 2014	Haleakala	Pan-STARRS 1	·	1.4 km	MPC · JPL
752385	2015 PF_{79}	—	February 28, 2014	Haleakala	Pan-STARRS 1	·	820 m	MPC · JPL
752386	2015 PS_{81}	—	December 8, 2012	Mount Lemmon	Mount Lemmon Survey	·	1.1 km	MPC · JPL
752387	2015 PA_{83}	—	July 18, 2015	Haleakala	Pan-STARRS 1	KOR	1.0 km	MPC · JPL
752388	2015 PC_{83}	—	July 14, 2015	Haleakala	Pan-STARRS 1	NYS	770 m	MPC · JPL
752389	2015 PW_{84}	—	June 26, 2015	Haleakala	Pan-STARRS 1	·	920 m	MPC · JPL
752390	2015 PU_{85}	—	November 7, 2008	Mount Lemmon	Mount Lemmon Survey	·	940 m	MPC · JPL
752391	2015 PU_{88}	—	July 24, 2015	Haleakala	Pan-STARRS 1	·	1.3 km	MPC · JPL
752392	2015 PV_{88}	—	January 17, 2009	Kitt Peak	Spacewatch	H	480 m	MPC · JPL
752393	2015 PH_{90}	—	November 2, 2007	Mount Lemmon	Mount Lemmon Survey	·	1.1 km	MPC · JPL
752394	2015 PL_{90}	—	June 29, 2015	Haleakala	Pan-STARRS 1	·	1.2 km	MPC · JPL
752395	2015 PC_{93}	—	February 20, 2014	Haleakala	Pan-STARRS 1	·	1.2 km	MPC · JPL
752396	2015 PR_{95}	—	October 12, 2007	Mount Lemmon	Mount Lemmon Survey	·	1.1 km	MPC · JPL
752397	2015 PZ_{98}	—	October 18, 2011	Catalina	CSS	·	1.3 km	MPC · JPL
752398	2015 PM_{100}	—	August 10, 2015	Haleakala	Pan-STARRS 1	·	1.2 km	MPC · JPL
752399	2015 PY_{102}	—	October 21, 2007	Mount Lemmon	Mount Lemmon Survey	·	900 m	MPC · JPL
752400	2015 PD_{104}	—	January 10, 2013	Kitt Peak	Spacewatch	·	1.3 km	MPC · JPL

== 752401–752500 ==
back to top

Designation			Discovery			Properties		Ref
Permanent	Provisional	Named after	Date	Site	Discoverer(s)	Category	Diam.	Ref
752401	2015 PT_{108}	—	July 24, 2015	Haleakala	Pan-STARRS 1	EOS	1.4 km	MPC · JPL
752402	2015 PU_{108}	—	July 24, 2015	Haleakala	Pan-STARRS 1	BRG	1.1 km	MPC · JPL
752403 Bayurisanto	2015 PZ_{114}	Bayurisanto	November 20, 2012	Mount Graham	K. Černis, R. P. Boyle	·	790 m	MPC · JPL
752404	2015 PG_{122}	—	August 10, 2015	Haleakala	Pan-STARRS 1	·	840 m	MPC · JPL
752405	2015 PK_{124}	—	August 10, 2015	Haleakala	Pan-STARRS 1	·	1.6 km	MPC · JPL
752406	2015 PV_{125}	—	August 10, 2015	Haleakala	Pan-STARRS 1	WIT	730 m	MPC · JPL
752407	2015 PK_{126}	—	September 25, 2011	Haleakala	Pan-STARRS 1	·	1.5 km	MPC · JPL
752408	2015 PE_{127}	—	April 2, 2014	Kitt Peak	Spacewatch	·	1.5 km	MPC · JPL
752409	2015 PC_{129}	—	August 25, 2000	Cerro Tololo	Deep Ecliptic Survey	·	840 m	MPC · JPL
752410	2015 PN_{132}	—	January 1, 2009	Kitt Peak	Spacewatch	EUN	950 m	MPC · JPL
752411	2015 PJ_{139}	—	October 7, 2008	Mount Lemmon	Mount Lemmon Survey	·	950 m	MPC · JPL
752412	2015 PJ_{141}	—	July 25, 2015	Haleakala	Pan-STARRS 1	·	790 m	MPC · JPL
752413	2015 PL_{143}	—	September 20, 2011	Kitt Peak	Spacewatch	·	1.3 km	MPC · JPL
752414	2015 PQ_{144}	—	July 19, 2015	Haleakala	Pan-STARRS 2	·	1.2 km	MPC · JPL
752415	2015 PM_{145}	—	September 4, 2011	Haleakala	Pan-STARRS 1	·	1.2 km	MPC · JPL
752416	2015 PO_{146}	—	October 9, 2007	Kitt Peak	Spacewatch	·	1.2 km	MPC · JPL
752417	2015 PG_{149}	—	October 25, 2005	Mount Lemmon	Mount Lemmon Survey	·	730 m	MPC · JPL
752418	2015 PO_{155}	—	August 10, 2015	Haleakala	Pan-STARRS 1	·	1.3 km	MPC · JPL
752419	2015 PE_{160}	—	June 25, 2015	Haleakala	Pan-STARRS 1	V	540 m	MPC · JPL
752420	2015 PX_{162}	—	October 20, 2011	Mount Lemmon	Mount Lemmon Survey	AGN	1.1 km	MPC · JPL
752421	2015 PB_{169}	—	April 25, 2007	Mount Lemmon	Mount Lemmon Survey	NYS	990 m	MPC · JPL
752422	2015 PU_{173}	—	April 5, 2014	Haleakala	Pan-STARRS 1	HYG	1.9 km	MPC · JPL
752423	2015 PX_{176}	—	November 4, 2007	Kitt Peak	Spacewatch	·	1.2 km	MPC · JPL
752424	2015 PA_{179}	—	July 24, 2015	Haleakala	Pan-STARRS 1	WIT	680 m	MPC · JPL
752425	2015 PV_{182}	—	January 5, 2013	Mount Lemmon	Mount Lemmon Survey	MAR	990 m	MPC · JPL
752426	2015 PZ_{182}	—	October 19, 2010	Mount Lemmon	Mount Lemmon Survey	·	2.4 km	MPC · JPL
752427	2015 PC_{186}	—	July 26, 2011	Haleakala	Pan-STARRS 1	PHO	800 m	MPC · JPL
752428	2015 PS_{186}	—	August 10, 2015	Haleakala	Pan-STARRS 1	·	830 m	MPC · JPL
752429	2015 PV_{186}	—	October 23, 2011	Mount Lemmon	Mount Lemmon Survey	·	1.6 km	MPC · JPL
752430	2015 PS_{189}	—	February 28, 2014	Mount Lemmon	Mount Lemmon Survey	·	1.2 km	MPC · JPL
752431	2015 PQ_{190}	—	May 23, 2014	Haleakala	Pan-STARRS 1	EUN	1.0 km	MPC · JPL
752432	2015 PR_{190}	—	July 19, 2015	Haleakala	Pan-STARRS 2	EUN	1.1 km	MPC · JPL
752433	2015 PP_{192}	—	October 19, 2003	Apache Point	SDSS	·	1.1 km	MPC · JPL
752434	2015 PK_{194}	—	March 9, 2014	Haleakala	Pan-STARRS 1	·	1.8 km	MPC · JPL
752435	2015 PT_{206}	—	August 10, 2015	Haleakala	Pan-STARRS 1	EUN	920 m	MPC · JPL
752436	2015 PX_{207}	—	August 9, 2015	Haleakala	Pan-STARRS 1	·	2.0 km	MPC · JPL
752437	2015 PV_{210}	—	March 20, 2014	Mount Lemmon	Mount Lemmon Survey	EUN	1.0 km	MPC · JPL
752438	2015 PJ_{212}	—	August 10, 2015	Haleakala	Pan-STARRS 1	·	1.1 km	MPC · JPL
752439	2015 PM_{216}	—	November 3, 2011	Mount Lemmon	Mount Lemmon Survey	JUN	790 m	MPC · JPL
752440	2015 PC_{217}	—	August 10, 2015	Haleakala	Pan-STARRS 1	·	2.0 km	MPC · JPL
752441	2015 PE_{217}	—	May 7, 2014	Haleakala	Pan-STARRS 1	·	1.5 km	MPC · JPL
752442	2015 PF_{217}	—	June 25, 2015	Haleakala	Pan-STARRS 1	·	1.6 km	MPC · JPL
752443	2015 PN_{217}	—	September 15, 2007	Mount Lemmon	Mount Lemmon Survey	·	1.4 km	MPC · JPL
752444	2015 PQ_{219}	—	August 10, 2015	Haleakala	Pan-STARRS 1	·	1.5 km	MPC · JPL
752445	2015 PP_{221}	—	May 8, 2014	Haleakala	Pan-STARRS 1	·	2.4 km	MPC · JPL
752446	2015 PB_{222}	—	April 22, 2014	Cerro Tololo	DECam	·	1.2 km	MPC · JPL
752447	2015 PH_{223}	—	February 10, 2014	Haleakala	Pan-STARRS 1	·	1.7 km	MPC · JPL
752448	2015 PL_{225}	—	August 10, 2015	Haleakala	Pan-STARRS 1	BRA	1.5 km	MPC · JPL
752449	2015 PC_{226}	—	October 1, 2011	Kitt Peak	Spacewatch	·	1.9 km	MPC · JPL
752450	2015 PN_{229}	—	August 29, 2006	Catalina	CSS	·	1.6 km	MPC · JPL
752451	2015 PJ_{230}	—	September 28, 2006	Catalina	CSS	·	1.5 km	MPC · JPL
752452	2015 PR_{233}	—	March 5, 2014	Haleakala	Pan-STARRS 1	·	1.3 km	MPC · JPL
752453	2015 PL_{238}	—	April 8, 2010	La Sagra	OAM	·	1.8 km	MPC · JPL
752454	2015 PW_{243}	—	July 24, 2015	Haleakala	Pan-STARRS 1	·	1.2 km	MPC · JPL
752455	2015 PH_{245}	—	June 17, 2015	Haleakala	Pan-STARRS 1	·	1.3 km	MPC · JPL
752456	2015 PA_{247}	—	July 24, 2015	Haleakala	Pan-STARRS 1	·	950 m	MPC · JPL
752457	2015 PJ_{249}	—	February 10, 2014	Mount Lemmon	Mount Lemmon Survey	·	940 m	MPC · JPL
752458	2015 PA_{255}	—	November 2, 2011	Mount Lemmon	Mount Lemmon Survey	·	1.4 km	MPC · JPL
752459	2015 PY_{255}	—	September 8, 2011	Kitt Peak	Spacewatch	·	970 m	MPC · JPL
752460	2015 PD_{256}	—	March 11, 2013	Mount Lemmon	Mount Lemmon Survey	3:2	4.7 km	MPC · JPL
752461	2015 PF_{259}	—	September 10, 2010	Kitt Peak	Spacewatch	·	2.0 km	MPC · JPL
752462	2015 PU_{261}	—	January 17, 2009	Kitt Peak	Spacewatch	·	1.1 km	MPC · JPL
752463	2015 PD_{264}	—	July 8, 2015	Kitt Peak	Spacewatch	·	1.2 km	MPC · JPL
752464	2015 PE_{269}	—	July 12, 2015	Haleakala	Pan-STARRS 1	·	910 m	MPC · JPL
752465	2015 PK_{278}	—	July 12, 2015	Haleakala	Pan-STARRS 1	·	1.5 km	MPC · JPL
752466	2015 PM_{285}	—	September 12, 2007	Catalina	CSS	·	1.1 km	MPC · JPL
752467	2015 PY_{285}	—	July 24, 2015	Haleakala	Pan-STARRS 1	HNS	1.0 km	MPC · JPL
752468	2015 PV_{286}	—	January 5, 2013	Kitt Peak	Spacewatch	HNS	820 m	MPC · JPL
752469	2015 PT_{290}	—	July 24, 2015	Haleakala	Pan-STARRS 1	·	1.9 km	MPC · JPL
752470	2015 PV_{291}	—	November 17, 2007	Mount Lemmon	Mount Lemmon Survey	·	1.3 km	MPC · JPL
752471	2015 PU_{292}	—	August 25, 2003	Palomar	NEAT	·	1.1 km	MPC · JPL
752472	2015 PB_{294}	—	October 8, 2008	Mount Lemmon	Mount Lemmon Survey	·	880 m	MPC · JPL
752473	2015 PE_{295}	—	June 7, 2010	Tenerife	ESA OGS	·	1.3 km	MPC · JPL
752474	2015 PH_{295}	—	October 26, 2011	Haleakala	Pan-STARRS 1	·	1.4 km	MPC · JPL
752475	2015 PQ_{295}	—	May 23, 2011	Mount Lemmon	Mount Lemmon Survey	·	750 m	MPC · JPL
752476	2015 PH_{297}	—	July 24, 2015	Haleakala	Pan-STARRS 1	·	1.4 km	MPC · JPL
752477	2015 PX_{297}	—	July 24, 2015	Haleakala	Pan-STARRS 1	·	1.5 km	MPC · JPL
752478	2015 PP_{299}	—	October 24, 2011	Haleakala	Pan-STARRS 1	·	1.4 km	MPC · JPL
752479	2015 PG_{304}	—	October 25, 2005	Kitt Peak	Spacewatch	·	810 m	MPC · JPL
752480	2015 PE_{305}	—	December 4, 2007	Kitt Peak	Spacewatch	NEM	1.6 km	MPC · JPL
752481	2015 PK_{305}	—	October 16, 2006	Kitt Peak	Spacewatch	KOR	1.2 km	MPC · JPL
752482	2015 PR_{305}	—	March 25, 2003	Palomar	NEAT	PHO	1.0 km	MPC · JPL
752483	2015 PG_{307}	—	December 3, 2012	Mount Lemmon	Mount Lemmon Survey	EUN	1.3 km	MPC · JPL
752484	2015 PJ_{307}	—	April 12, 2010	Mount Lemmon	Mount Lemmon Survey	EUN	840 m	MPC · JPL
752485	2015 PG_{309}	—	August 15, 2001	Haleakala	NEAT	·	710 m	MPC · JPL
752486	2015 PH_{309}	—	April 10, 2010	Kitt Peak	Spacewatch	·	1.4 km	MPC · JPL
752487	2015 PP_{309}	—	May 21, 2010	Mount Lemmon	Mount Lemmon Survey	·	1.6 km	MPC · JPL
752488	2015 PO_{311}	—	September 9, 2011	Kitt Peak	Spacewatch	·	1.2 km	MPC · JPL
752489	2015 PS_{314}	—	February 17, 2013	Mount Lemmon	Mount Lemmon Survey	·	1.6 km	MPC · JPL
752490	2015 PD_{316}	—	November 2, 2011	Kitt Peak	Spacewatch	·	1.4 km	MPC · JPL
752491	2015 PM_{318}	—	April 5, 2014	Haleakala	Pan-STARRS 1	·	1.4 km	MPC · JPL
752492	2015 PQ_{318}	—	August 9, 2015	Haleakala	Pan-STARRS 1	·	990 m	MPC · JPL
752493	2015 PC_{319}	—	September 29, 2011	Mount Lemmon	Mount Lemmon Survey	·	1.3 km	MPC · JPL
752494	2015 PG_{319}	—	September 25, 2011	Haleakala	Pan-STARRS 1	·	970 m	MPC · JPL
752495	2015 PZ_{320}	—	November 25, 2011	Haleakala	Pan-STARRS 1	·	1.6 km	MPC · JPL
752496	2015 PH_{323}	—	August 14, 2015	Haleakala	Pan-STARRS 1	·	1.3 km	MPC · JPL
752497	2015 PJ_{323}	—	August 11, 2015	Haleakala	Pan-STARRS 1	·	1.4 km	MPC · JPL
752498	2015 PW_{323}	—	August 10, 2015	Haleakala	Pan-STARRS 1	·	1.5 km	MPC · JPL
752499	2015 PJ_{332}	—	August 14, 2015	Haleakala	Pan-STARRS 1	·	1.2 km	MPC · JPL
752500	2015 PS_{335}	—	August 12, 2015	Haleakala	Pan-STARRS 1	·	1.4 km	MPC · JPL

== 752501–752600 ==
back to top

Designation			Discovery			Properties		Ref
Permanent	Provisional	Named after	Date	Site	Discoverer(s)	Category	Diam.	Ref
752501	2015 PZ_{336}	—	August 9, 2015	Haleakala	Pan-STARRS 1	GAL	1.3 km	MPC · JPL
752502	2015 PU_{338}	—	August 10, 2015	Haleakala	Pan-STARRS 1	·	1.2 km	MPC · JPL
752503	2015 PM_{339}	—	August 14, 2015	Haleakala	Pan-STARRS 1	·	1.4 km	MPC · JPL
752504	2015 PA_{340}	—	August 14, 2015	Haleakala	Pan-STARRS 1	·	1.2 km	MPC · JPL
752505	2015 QM	—	December 20, 2007	Mount Lemmon	Mount Lemmon Survey	·	1.8 km	MPC · JPL
752506	2015 QQ_{1}	—	September 2, 2011	Haleakala	Pan-STARRS 1	·	1.1 km	MPC · JPL
752507	2015 QR_{4}	—	June 25, 2015	Haleakala	Pan-STARRS 1	·	580 m	MPC · JPL
752508	2015 QL_{5}	—	November 6, 2005	Kitt Peak	Spacewatch	·	650 m	MPC · JPL
752509	2015 QZ_{9}	—	October 15, 2004	Mount Lemmon	Mount Lemmon Survey	MAS	690 m	MPC · JPL
752510	2015 QY_{11}	—	August 21, 2015	Haleakala	Pan-STARRS 1	H	450 m	MPC · JPL
752511	2015 QH_{13}	—	May 7, 2014	Haleakala	Pan-STARRS 1	MRX	860 m	MPC · JPL
752512	2015 QU_{13}	—	December 15, 2007	Mount Lemmon	Mount Lemmon Survey	·	1.2 km	MPC · JPL
752513	2015 QK_{15}	—	October 20, 2011	Mount Lemmon	Mount Lemmon Survey	·	1.2 km	MPC · JPL
752514	2015 QO_{15}	—	August 19, 2015	Kitt Peak	Spacewatch	EUN	970 m	MPC · JPL
752515	2015 QT_{15}	—	June 27, 2015	Haleakala	Pan-STARRS 1	NEM	1.5 km	MPC · JPL
752516	2015 QX_{17}	—	April 5, 2014	Haleakala	Pan-STARRS 1	KON	1.6 km	MPC · JPL
752517	2015 QL_{19}	—	August 19, 2015	Kitt Peak	Spacewatch	·	1.9 km	MPC · JPL
752518	2015 QQ_{19}	—	August 21, 2015	Haleakala	Pan-STARRS 1	PAD	1.4 km	MPC · JPL
752519	2015 QW_{19}	—	August 21, 2015	Haleakala	Pan-STARRS 1	·	1.2 km	MPC · JPL
752520	2015 QQ_{20}	—	August 18, 2015	Catalina	CSS	·	870 m	MPC · JPL
752521	2015 QE_{28}	—	August 21, 2015	Haleakala	Pan-STARRS 1	·	1.7 km	MPC · JPL
752522	2015 QG_{37}	—	August 21, 2015	Haleakala	Pan-STARRS 1	HNS	1.1 km	MPC · JPL
752523	2015 QE_{38}	—	August 18, 2015	Kitt Peak	Spacewatch	·	1.1 km	MPC · JPL
752524	2015 RT	—	July 21, 2006	Mount Lemmon	Mount Lemmon Survey	·	1.6 km	MPC · JPL
752525	2015 RH_{1}	—	June 29, 2011	Kitt Peak	Spacewatch	·	1.2 km	MPC · JPL
752526	2015 RK_{1}	—	June 12, 2011	Mount Lemmon	Mount Lemmon Survey	·	1.4 km	MPC · JPL
752527	2015 RO_{1}	—	July 1, 2011	Haleakala	Pan-STARRS 1	(194)	1.3 km	MPC · JPL
752528	2015 RR_{3}	—	November 14, 2012	Mount Lemmon	Mount Lemmon Survey	·	1.4 km	MPC · JPL
752529	2015 RM_{6}	—	January 26, 2006	Mount Lemmon	Mount Lemmon Survey	·	1.1 km	MPC · JPL
752530	2015 RU_{7}	—	September 4, 2011	Haleakala	Pan-STARRS 1	·	1.4 km	MPC · JPL
752531	2015 RN_{8}	—	November 17, 2007	Mount Lemmon	Mount Lemmon Survey	·	1.3 km	MPC · JPL
752532	2015 RP_{11}	—	July 28, 2015	Haleakala	Pan-STARRS 1	NEM	1.7 km	MPC · JPL
752533	2015 RU_{11}	—	February 22, 2001	Apache Point	SDSS	H	410 m	MPC · JPL
752534	2015 RA_{18}	—	October 4, 2006	Mount Lemmon	Mount Lemmon Survey	·	1.3 km	MPC · JPL
752535	2015 RP_{18}	—	July 30, 2015	Haleakala	Pan-STARRS 1	·	1.3 km	MPC · JPL
752536	2015 RU_{18}	—	November 25, 2011	Haleakala	Pan-STARRS 1	EUN	1.1 km	MPC · JPL
752537	2015 RU_{19}	—	September 23, 2011	Kitt Peak	Spacewatch	·	1.1 km	MPC · JPL
752538	2015 RY_{19}	—	August 9, 2015	Haleakala	Pan-STARRS 1	·	1.0 km	MPC · JPL
752539	2015 RC_{20}	—	July 25, 2015	Haleakala	Pan-STARRS 1	·	920 m	MPC · JPL
752540	2015 RU_{22}	—	July 30, 2015	Haleakala	Pan-STARRS 1	V	600 m	MPC · JPL
752541	2015 RG_{25}	—	August 19, 2006	Kitt Peak	Spacewatch	·	1.3 km	MPC · JPL
752542	2015 RN_{26}	—	October 6, 2002	Anderson Mesa	LONEOS	·	1.1 km	MPC · JPL
752543	2015 RE_{27}	—	October 20, 2011	Kitt Peak	Spacewatch	·	1.1 km	MPC · JPL
752544	2015 RS_{28}	—	November 17, 2011	Mount Lemmon	Mount Lemmon Survey	·	1.5 km	MPC · JPL
752545	2015 RD_{29}	—	September 23, 2011	Kitt Peak	Spacewatch	·	1.3 km	MPC · JPL
752546	2015 RX_{32}	—	October 26, 2011	Haleakala	Pan-STARRS 1	·	1.4 km	MPC · JPL
752547	2015 RY_{32}	—	November 23, 2006	Kitt Peak	Spacewatch	·	1.7 km	MPC · JPL
752548	2015 RP_{34}	—	May 20, 2014	Haleakala	Pan-STARRS 1	·	1.8 km	MPC · JPL
752549	2015 RJ_{38}	—	March 10, 2014	Kitt Peak	Spacewatch	·	910 m	MPC · JPL
752550	2015 RG_{39}	—	January 10, 2013	Haleakala	Pan-STARRS 1	·	1.3 km	MPC · JPL
752551	2015 RE_{40}	—	July 23, 2015	Haleakala	Pan-STARRS 1	·	1.4 km	MPC · JPL
752552	2015 RJ_{40}	—	September 13, 2007	Mount Lemmon	Mount Lemmon Survey	·	780 m	MPC · JPL
752553	2015 RV_{46}	—	July 30, 2015	Haleakala	Pan-STARRS 2	(194)	1.2 km	MPC · JPL
752554	2015 RH_{49}	—	October 25, 2011	Haleakala	Pan-STARRS 1	·	1.4 km	MPC · JPL
752555	2015 RE_{50}	—	September 17, 2006	Kitt Peak	Spacewatch	·	1.3 km	MPC · JPL
752556	2015 RG_{51}	—	February 9, 2005	Kitt Peak	Spacewatch	·	1.3 km	MPC · JPL
752557	2015 RY_{55}	—	February 14, 2013	Haleakala	Pan-STARRS 1	·	1.2 km	MPC · JPL
752558	2015 RQ_{56}	—	September 23, 2004	Kitt Peak	Spacewatch	·	1.1 km	MPC · JPL
752559	2015 RY_{58}	—	August 27, 2006	Kitt Peak	Spacewatch	·	1.2 km	MPC · JPL
752560	2015 RH_{63}	—	September 17, 2006	Kitt Peak	Spacewatch	·	1.2 km	MPC · JPL
752561	2015 RQ_{63}	—	March 27, 2001	Eskridge	G. Hug	H	530 m	MPC · JPL
752562	2015 RM_{68}	—	July 23, 2015	Haleakala	Pan-STARRS 1	·	1.2 km	MPC · JPL
752563	2015 RF_{69}	—	August 15, 2004	Cerro Tololo	Deep Ecliptic Survey	·	810 m	MPC · JPL
752564	2015 RH_{74}	—	September 19, 2006	Kitt Peak	Spacewatch	·	1.2 km	MPC · JPL
752565	2015 RC_{76}	—	September 18, 2006	Kitt Peak	Spacewatch	·	1.4 km	MPC · JPL
752566	2015 RS_{80}	—	July 23, 2015	Haleakala	Pan-STARRS 1	AGN	960 m	MPC · JPL
752567	2015 RD_{84}	—	December 29, 2011	Mount Lemmon	Mount Lemmon Survey	JUN	840 m	MPC · JPL
752568	2015 RQ_{84}	—	August 8, 2015	Haleakala	Pan-STARRS 1	·	1.3 km	MPC · JPL
752569	2015 RE_{85}	—	November 11, 2002	Kitt Peak	Spacewatch	·	1.1 km	MPC · JPL
752570	2015 RB_{86}	—	August 26, 2011	Haleakala	Pan-STARRS 1	·	1.6 km	MPC · JPL
752571	2015 RW_{87}	—	November 9, 1999	Socorro	LINEAR	·	2.5 km	MPC · JPL
752572	2015 RC_{88}	—	July 13, 2010	WISE	WISE	·	1.8 km	MPC · JPL
752573	2015 RS_{88}	—	January 4, 2013	Cerro Tololo	DECam	·	590 m	MPC · JPL
752574	2015 RR_{89}	—	August 4, 2011	La Sagra	OAM	·	930 m	MPC · JPL
752575	2015 RJ_{90}	—	February 28, 2014	Haleakala	Pan-STARRS 1	·	1.4 km	MPC · JPL
752576	2015 RY_{91}	—	August 2, 2011	Tenerife	ESA OGS	·	1.2 km	MPC · JPL
752577	2015 RA_{92}	—	February 27, 2014	Mount Lemmon	Mount Lemmon Survey	·	720 m	MPC · JPL
752578	2015 RT_{93}	—	September 2, 2008	Kitt Peak	Spacewatch	·	680 m	MPC · JPL
752579	2015 RX_{94}	—	July 28, 2015	Haleakala	Pan-STARRS 1	·	670 m	MPC · JPL
752580	2015 RJ_{95}	—	December 31, 2007	Kitt Peak	Spacewatch	·	1.6 km	MPC · JPL
752581	2015 RQ_{95}	—	October 24, 2011	Haleakala	Pan-STARRS 1	·	1.2 km	MPC · JPL
752582	2015 RZ_{95}	—	July 28, 2015	Haleakala	Pan-STARRS 1	·	1.2 km	MPC · JPL
752583	2015 RU_{96}	—	July 23, 2015	Haleakala	Pan-STARRS 1	·	1.6 km	MPC · JPL
752584	2015 RV_{97}	—	July 27, 2011	Haleakala	Pan-STARRS 1	·	1.1 km	MPC · JPL
752585	2015 RD_{99}	—	July 25, 2015	Haleakala	Pan-STARRS 1	·	1.1 km	MPC · JPL
752586	2015 RM_{99}	—	April 24, 2014	Mount Lemmon	Mount Lemmon Survey	·	1.6 km	MPC · JPL
752587	2015 RN_{99}	—	August 9, 2015	Haleakala	Pan-STARRS 1	·	1.8 km	MPC · JPL
752588	2015 RG_{100}	—	January 12, 2008	Mount Lemmon	Mount Lemmon Survey	JUN	790 m	MPC · JPL
752589	2015 RM_{102}	—	November 7, 2007	Mount Lemmon	Mount Lemmon Survey	·	1.6 km	MPC · JPL
752590	2015 RT_{102}	—	August 19, 2015	Catalina	CSS	·	2.1 km	MPC · JPL
752591	2015 RA_{103}	—	October 13, 2006	Kitt Peak	Spacewatch	·	1.5 km	MPC · JPL
752592	2015 RU_{104}	—	April 30, 2014	Haleakala	Pan-STARRS 1	MAR	800 m	MPC · JPL
752593	2015 RV_{104}	—	August 31, 2011	Haleakala	Pan-STARRS 1	·	1.0 km	MPC · JPL
752594	2015 RA_{107}	—	August 26, 2011	La Sagra	OAM	·	1.1 km	MPC · JPL
752595	2015 RF_{109}	—	August 12, 2015	Haleakala	Pan-STARRS 1	·	1.6 km	MPC · JPL
752596	2015 RG_{112}	—	May 21, 2014	Haleakala	Pan-STARRS 1	·	1.2 km	MPC · JPL
752597	2015 RB_{113}	—	November 1, 2011	Catalina	CSS	·	1.4 km	MPC · JPL
752598	2015 RD_{114}	—	September 9, 2015	Haleakala	Pan-STARRS 1	·	1.9 km	MPC · JPL
752599	2015 RQ_{115}	—	October 25, 2011	Haleakala	Pan-STARRS 1	·	1.2 km	MPC · JPL
752600	2015 RX_{115}	—	September 25, 2006	Catalina	CSS	·	1.7 km	MPC · JPL

== 752601–752700 ==
back to top

Designation			Discovery			Properties		Ref
Permanent	Provisional	Named after	Date	Site	Discoverer(s)	Category	Diam.	Ref
752601	2015 RC_{117}	—	October 26, 2008	Mount Lemmon	Mount Lemmon Survey	·	1.1 km	MPC · JPL
752602	2015 RH_{117}	—	September 13, 2015	Atom Site	Space Surveillance Telescope	·	1.7 km	MPC · JPL
752603	2015 RA_{119}	—	September 29, 2011	Mount Lemmon	Mount Lemmon Survey	·	1.2 km	MPC · JPL
752604	2015 RS_{119}	—	May 21, 2014	Haleakala	Pan-STARRS 1	·	1.1 km	MPC · JPL
752605	2015 RD_{120}	—	August 14, 2015	Haleakala	Pan-STARRS 1	·	1.7 km	MPC · JPL
752606	2015 RA_{121}	—	September 14, 2002	Palomar	NEAT	·	1.3 km	MPC · JPL
752607	2015 RY_{121}	—	July 19, 2015	Haleakala	Pan-STARRS 1	·	1.4 km	MPC · JPL
752608	2015 RZ_{122}	—	August 5, 2002	Palomar	NEAT	·	1.5 km	MPC · JPL
752609	2015 RD_{133}	—	October 19, 2011	Kitt Peak	Spacewatch	·	1.2 km	MPC · JPL
752610	2015 RB_{135}	—	September 9, 2015	Haleakala	Pan-STARRS 1	·	1.1 km	MPC · JPL
752611	2015 RB_{137}	—	November 24, 2008	Kitt Peak	Spacewatch	NYS	880 m	MPC · JPL
752612	2015 RA_{140}	—	September 23, 2011	Haleakala	Pan-STARRS 1	(5)	1.0 km	MPC · JPL
752613	2015 RX_{141}	—	July 25, 2015	Haleakala	Pan-STARRS 1	·	500 m	MPC · JPL
752614	2015 RM_{143}	—	September 9, 2015	Haleakala	Pan-STARRS 1	·	2.0 km	MPC · JPL
752615	2015 RA_{145}	—	August 13, 2004	Cerro Tololo	Deep Ecliptic Survey	·	2.2 km	MPC · JPL
752616	2015 RO_{149}	—	May 7, 2014	Haleakala	Pan-STARRS 1	·	1.4 km	MPC · JPL
752617	2015 RZ_{150}	—	November 4, 2007	Kitt Peak	Spacewatch	·	1.0 km	MPC · JPL
752618	2015 RF_{155}	—	January 10, 2013	Haleakala	Pan-STARRS 1	AGN	960 m	MPC · JPL
752619	2015 RZ_{155}	—	May 28, 2014	Haleakala	Pan-STARRS 1	·	1.3 km	MPC · JPL
752620	2015 RW_{162}	—	July 25, 2015	Haleakala	Pan-STARRS 1	·	1.6 km	MPC · JPL
752621	2015 RZ_{175}	—	December 23, 2012	Haleakala	Pan-STARRS 1	·	1.4 km	MPC · JPL
752622	2015 RL_{187}	—	July 8, 2015	Haleakala	Pan-STARRS 1	·	2.4 km	MPC · JPL
752623	2015 RW_{188}	—	July 12, 2015	Haleakala	Pan-STARRS 1	EUN	1.0 km	MPC · JPL
752624	2015 RY_{188}	—	September 10, 2015	Haleakala	Pan-STARRS 1	·	2.8 km	MPC · JPL
752625	2015 RR_{189}	—	December 8, 2012	Mount Lemmon	Mount Lemmon Survey	HNS	1.0 km	MPC · JPL
752626	2015 RZ_{190}	—	July 23, 2015	Haleakala	Pan-STARRS 1	·	1.4 km	MPC · JPL
752627	2015 RA_{192}	—	April 5, 2014	Haleakala	Pan-STARRS 1	·	970 m	MPC · JPL
752628	2015 RL_{192}	—	September 15, 2007	Mount Lemmon	Mount Lemmon Survey	3:2	3.7 km	MPC · JPL
752629	2015 RJ_{193}	—	July 23, 2015	Haleakala	Pan-STARRS 1	·	530 m	MPC · JPL
752630	2015 RF_{197}	—	September 11, 2015	Haleakala	Pan-STARRS 1	·	2.5 km	MPC · JPL
752631	2015 RF_{200}	—	November 17, 2011	Mount Lemmon	Mount Lemmon Survey	·	1.2 km	MPC · JPL
752632	2015 RM_{202}	—	August 12, 2015	Haleakala	Pan-STARRS 1	·	1.0 km	MPC · JPL
752633	2015 RE_{203}	—	February 28, 2012	Haleakala	Pan-STARRS 1	·	1.9 km	MPC · JPL
752634	2015 RX_{207}	—	February 28, 2014	Haleakala	Pan-STARRS 1	JUN	890 m	MPC · JPL
752635	2015 RH_{208}	—	August 12, 2015	Haleakala	Pan-STARRS 1	·	1.6 km	MPC · JPL
752636	2015 RG_{214}	—	December 28, 2011	Kitt Peak	Spacewatch	·	1.2 km	MPC · JPL
752637	2015 RD_{215}	—	September 11, 2015	Haleakala	Pan-STARRS 1	·	2.1 km	MPC · JPL
752638	2015 RY_{219}	—	August 23, 2011	Haleakala	Pan-STARRS 1	·	1.0 km	MPC · JPL
752639	2015 RD_{221}	—	September 11, 2015	Haleakala	Pan-STARRS 1	·	1.6 km	MPC · JPL
752640	2015 RF_{223}	—	September 18, 2006	Kitt Peak	Spacewatch	·	1.1 km	MPC · JPL
752641	2015 RH_{223}	—	December 25, 2005	Kitt Peak	Spacewatch	·	1.5 km	MPC · JPL
752642	2015 RW_{223}	—	September 11, 2015	Haleakala	Pan-STARRS 1	AGN	870 m	MPC · JPL
752643	2015 RO_{224}	—	August 12, 2015	Haleakala	Pan-STARRS 1	NEM	1.8 km	MPC · JPL
752644	2015 RO_{227}	—	August 21, 2015	Haleakala	Pan-STARRS 1	·	2.2 km	MPC · JPL
752645	2015 RU_{231}	—	March 21, 2009	Mount Lemmon	Mount Lemmon Survey	·	1.3 km	MPC · JPL
752646	2015 RQ_{232}	—	September 11, 2015	Haleakala	Pan-STARRS 1	·	1.6 km	MPC · JPL
752647	2015 RR_{234}	—	August 21, 2015	Haleakala	Pan-STARRS 1	·	1.4 km	MPC · JPL
752648	2015 RY_{234}	—	October 23, 2011	Haleakala	Pan-STARRS 1	·	1.3 km	MPC · JPL
752649	2015 RT_{237}	—	August 12, 2015	Haleakala	Pan-STARRS 1	BRA	1.4 km	MPC · JPL
752650	2015 RU_{237}	—	August 12, 2015	Haleakala	Pan-STARRS 1	·	1.6 km	MPC · JPL
752651	2015 RS_{238}	—	August 12, 2015	Haleakala	Pan-STARRS 1	·	1.5 km	MPC · JPL
752652	2015 RV_{238}	—	January 16, 2007	Mount Lemmon	Mount Lemmon Survey	·	1.5 km	MPC · JPL
752653	2015 RX_{238}	—	October 23, 2011	Haleakala	Pan-STARRS 1	·	870 m	MPC · JPL
752654	2015 RY_{238}	—	September 11, 2015	Haleakala	Pan-STARRS 1	·	1.2 km	MPC · JPL
752655	2015 RQ_{240}	—	November 20, 2008	Kitt Peak	Spacewatch	·	940 m	MPC · JPL
752656	2015 RW_{240}	—	September 11, 2015	Haleakala	Pan-STARRS 1	·	1.6 km	MPC · JPL
752657	2015 RR_{241}	—	December 25, 2005	Mount Lemmon	Mount Lemmon Survey	·	2.0 km	MPC · JPL
752658	2015 RT_{241}	—	September 26, 2006	Catalina	CSS	·	1.5 km	MPC · JPL
752659	2015 RQ_{242}	—	March 15, 2013	Palomar	Palomar Transient Factory	·	2.0 km	MPC · JPL
752660	2015 RD_{243}	—	March 23, 2014	Mount Lemmon	Mount Lemmon Survey	·	1.1 km	MPC · JPL
752661	2015 RJ_{243}	—	September 7, 2015	ISON-SSO	L. Elenin	·	1.5 km	MPC · JPL
752662	2015 RT_{244}	—	July 28, 2015	Haleakala	Pan-STARRS 1	·	800 m	MPC · JPL
752663	2015 RQ_{245}	—	March 4, 2005	Mount Lemmon	Mount Lemmon Survey	JUN	840 m	MPC · JPL
752664	2015 RL_{250}	—	September 30, 2006	Mount Lemmon	Mount Lemmon Survey	·	1.2 km	MPC · JPL
752665	2015 RE_{252}	—	September 12, 2015	Haleakala	Pan-STARRS 1	AGN	990 m	MPC · JPL
752666	2015 RC_{254}	—	April 2, 2006	Mount Lemmon	Mount Lemmon Survey	·	2.7 km	MPC · JPL
752667	2015 RO_{254}	—	October 2, 2006	Mount Lemmon	Mount Lemmon Survey	·	1.5 km	MPC · JPL
752668	2015 RK_{257}	—	October 9, 2010	Mount Lemmon	Mount Lemmon Survey	KOR	1.1 km	MPC · JPL
752669	2015 RL_{257}	—	January 17, 2008	Mount Lemmon	Mount Lemmon Survey	·	1.3 km	MPC · JPL
752670	2015 RM_{257}	—	January 15, 2008	Mount Lemmon	Mount Lemmon Survey	·	1.3 km	MPC · JPL
752671	2015 RO_{257}	—	September 10, 2015	Haleakala	Pan-STARRS 1	·	970 m	MPC · JPL
752672	2015 RX_{257}	—	December 30, 2007	Mount Lemmon	Mount Lemmon Survey	AGN	850 m	MPC · JPL
752673	2015 RV_{258}	—	September 9, 2015	Haleakala	Pan-STARRS 1	·	2.2 km	MPC · JPL
752674	2015 RX_{258}	—	September 17, 2009	Mount Lemmon	Mount Lemmon Survey	·	1.8 km	MPC · JPL
752675	2015 RE_{259}	—	September 9, 2015	Haleakala	Pan-STARRS 1	·	1.6 km	MPC · JPL
752676	2015 RL_{259}	—	September 10, 2015	Haleakala	Pan-STARRS 1	·	1.4 km	MPC · JPL
752677	2015 RF_{261}	—	October 20, 2007	Kitt Peak	Spacewatch	·	760 m	MPC · JPL
752678	2015 RU_{262}	—	September 28, 2006	Kitt Peak	Spacewatch	·	1.4 km	MPC · JPL
752679	2015 RE_{264}	—	August 19, 2006	Kitt Peak	Spacewatch	(12739)	1.3 km	MPC · JPL
752680	2015 RU_{264}	—	September 18, 2006	Kitt Peak	Spacewatch	·	1.6 km	MPC · JPL
752681	2015 RA_{265}	—	October 26, 2011	Haleakala	Pan-STARRS 1	·	1.1 km	MPC · JPL
752682	2015 RF_{267}	—	October 29, 1999	Kitt Peak	Spacewatch	·	1.7 km	MPC · JPL
752683	2015 RR_{267}	—	September 9, 2015	Haleakala	Pan-STARRS 1	KON	1.9 km	MPC · JPL
752684	2015 RE_{268}	—	September 12, 2010	Kitt Peak	Spacewatch	·	1.5 km	MPC · JPL
752685	2015 RQ_{270}	—	September 10, 2015	Haleakala	Pan-STARRS 1	·	1.5 km	MPC · JPL
752686	2015 RP_{277}	—	September 12, 2015	Haleakala	Pan-STARRS 1	·	1.4 km	MPC · JPL
752687	2015 RX_{281}	—	September 9, 2015	Haleakala	Pan-STARRS 1	·	1.1 km	MPC · JPL
752688	2015 RC_{282}	—	September 9, 2015	Haleakala	Pan-STARRS 1	TIR	2.4 km	MPC · JPL
752689	2015 RF_{282}	—	October 6, 2004	Kitt Peak	Spacewatch	·	2.1 km	MPC · JPL
752690	2015 RW_{300}	—	September 12, 2015	Haleakala	Pan-STARRS 1	·	1.5 km	MPC · JPL
752691	2015 RA_{304}	—	September 6, 2015	Kitt Peak	Spacewatch	·	1.3 km	MPC · JPL
752692	2015 RS_{325}	—	September 10, 2015	Haleakala	Pan-STARRS 1	·	1.3 km	MPC · JPL
752693	2015 RQ_{327}	—	September 9, 2015	XuYi	PMO NEO Survey Program	·	1.3 km	MPC · JPL
752694	2015 RU_{330}	—	September 6, 2015	Kitt Peak	Spacewatch	·	1.5 km	MPC · JPL
752695	2015 RT_{343}	—	September 6, 2015	Haleakala	Pan-STARRS 1	·	2.9 km	MPC · JPL
752696	2015 RO_{356}	—	March 13, 2013	Mount Lemmon	Mount Lemmon Survey	KOR	990 m	MPC · JPL
752697	2015 SE_{1}	—	April 5, 2014	Haleakala	Pan-STARRS 1	·	1.2 km	MPC · JPL
752698	2015 SK_{2}	—	April 15, 2012	Haleakala	Pan-STARRS 1	H	450 m	MPC · JPL
752699	2015 SY_{3}	—	December 5, 2002	Socorro	LINEAR	·	1.5 km	MPC · JPL
752700	2015 SJ_{4}	—	August 1, 2015	Haleakala	Pan-STARRS 1	·	1.2 km	MPC · JPL

== 752701–752800 ==
back to top

Designation			Discovery			Properties		Ref
Permanent	Provisional	Named after	Date	Site	Discoverer(s)	Category	Diam.	Ref
752701	2015 SK_{4}	—	October 1, 2011	Mount Lemmon	Mount Lemmon Survey	·	1.3 km	MPC · JPL
752702	2015 SS_{4}	—	September 21, 2011	Kitt Peak	Spacewatch	·	1.2 km	MPC · JPL
752703	2015 SU_{4}	—	September 21, 2011	Catalina	CSS	·	1.1 km	MPC · JPL
752704	2015 SE_{6}	—	January 10, 2008	Kitt Peak	Spacewatch	·	1.3 km	MPC · JPL
752705	2015 SY_{6}	—	October 6, 2012	Haleakala	Pan-STARRS 1	·	720 m	MPC · JPL
752706	2015 SQ_{7}	—	August 28, 2015	Haleakala	Pan-STARRS 1	HNS	1.3 km	MPC · JPL
752707	2015 SH_{9}	—	March 19, 2009	Kitt Peak	Spacewatch	(194)	1.5 km	MPC · JPL
752708	2015 SL_{9}	—	September 23, 2015	Mount Lemmon	Mount Lemmon Survey	EUN	1.1 km	MPC · JPL
752709	2015 SU_{11}	—	October 3, 2006	Mount Lemmon	Mount Lemmon Survey	·	1.4 km	MPC · JPL
752710	2015 SU_{12}	—	July 23, 2015	Haleakala	Pan-STARRS 1	AGN	810 m	MPC · JPL
752711	2015 SO_{14}	—	October 19, 2011	Kitt Peak	Spacewatch	·	1.2 km	MPC · JPL
752712	2015 SA_{15}	—	May 21, 2014	Haleakala	Pan-STARRS 1	·	880 m	MPC · JPL
752713	2015 SQ_{16}	—	October 22, 2011	Catalina	CSS	(194)	1.1 km	MPC · JPL
752714	2015 SL_{17}	—	October 20, 2006	Kitt Peak	Spacewatch	·	1.5 km	MPC · JPL
752715	2015 SA_{18}	—	July 23, 2015	Haleakala	Pan-STARRS 1	·	1.6 km	MPC · JPL
752716	2015 SC_{25}	—	February 5, 2013	Kitt Peak	Spacewatch	·	1.1 km	MPC · JPL
752717	2015 SA_{26}	—	August 27, 2006	Kitt Peak	Spacewatch	EUN	1.0 km	MPC · JPL
752718	2015 SL_{26}	—	September 19, 2015	Haleakala	Pan-STARRS 1	·	1.7 km	MPC · JPL
752719	2015 SN_{26}	—	September 19, 2015	Haleakala	Pan-STARRS 1	(7605)	3.0 km	MPC · JPL
752720	2015 SN_{27}	—	November 24, 2011	Mount Lemmon	Mount Lemmon Survey	·	1.6 km	MPC · JPL
752721	2015 SB_{28}	—	September 27, 2006	Kitt Peak	Spacewatch	·	1.2 km	MPC · JPL
752722	2015 SL_{28}	—	May 21, 2014	Haleakala	Pan-STARRS 1	·	1.1 km	MPC · JPL
752723	2015 SL_{29}	—	December 6, 2011	Haleakala	Pan-STARRS 1	·	1.3 km	MPC · JPL
752724	2015 SO_{29}	—	July 7, 2014	Haleakala	Pan-STARRS 1	·	1.5 km	MPC · JPL
752725	2015 ST_{29}	—	December 25, 2005	Kitt Peak	Spacewatch	·	2.1 km	MPC · JPL
752726	2015 SH_{30}	—	September 23, 2015	Haleakala	Pan-STARRS 1	·	2.1 km	MPC · JPL
752727	2015 SJ_{30}	—	October 26, 2011	Haleakala	Pan-STARRS 1	·	1.5 km	MPC · JPL
752728	2015 SU_{30}	—	September 23, 2015	Haleakala	Pan-STARRS 1	·	1.2 km	MPC · JPL
752729	2015 SF_{46}	—	September 23, 2015	Haleakala	Pan-STARRS 1	·	1.2 km	MPC · JPL
752730	2015 TQ_{1}	—	September 10, 2015	Haleakala	Pan-STARRS 1	·	1.3 km	MPC · JPL
752731	2015 TR_{3}	—	November 16, 2011	Kitt Peak	Spacewatch	EUN	1.1 km	MPC · JPL
752732	2015 TD_{4}	—	September 18, 2006	Catalina	CSS	·	1.5 km	MPC · JPL
752733	2015 TR_{8}	—	October 12, 2007	Kitt Peak	Spacewatch	·	860 m	MPC · JPL
752734	2015 TJ_{9}	—	January 21, 2013	Mount Lemmon	Mount Lemmon Survey	·	2.1 km	MPC · JPL
752735	2015 TX_{9}	—	July 25, 2015	Haleakala	Pan-STARRS 1	·	1.1 km	MPC · JPL
752736	2015 TM_{10}	—	July 25, 2015	Haleakala	Pan-STARRS 1	BRG	1.4 km	MPC · JPL
752737	2015 TV_{13}	—	January 30, 2008	Mount Lemmon	Mount Lemmon Survey	·	1.7 km	MPC · JPL
752738	2015 TM_{14}	—	March 23, 2014	Mount Lemmon	Mount Lemmon Survey	·	1.1 km	MPC · JPL
752739	2015 TV_{16}	—	April 3, 2014	Haleakala	Pan-STARRS 1	(194)	1.3 km	MPC · JPL
752740	2015 TR_{17}	—	October 18, 2011	Haleakala	Pan-STARRS 1	·	1.4 km	MPC · JPL
752741	2015 TV_{21}	—	June 4, 2006	Mount Lemmon	Mount Lemmon Survey	·	1.3 km	MPC · JPL
752742	2015 TH_{22}	—	October 28, 2006	Catalina	CSS	·	1.6 km	MPC · JPL
752743	2015 TF_{23}	—	July 30, 2014	Haleakala	Pan-STARRS 1	T_{j} (2.97)	2.6 km	MPC · JPL
752744	2015 TU_{24}	—	August 22, 2006	Siding Spring	SSS	·	2.0 km	MPC · JPL
752745	2015 TN_{32}	—	April 7, 2014	Mount Lemmon	Mount Lemmon Survey	·	1.0 km	MPC · JPL
752746	2015 TT_{33}	—	July 24, 2015	Haleakala	Pan-STARRS 1	·	1.2 km	MPC · JPL
752747	2015 TH_{34}	—	July 23, 2015	Haleakala	Pan-STARRS 1	·	2.5 km	MPC · JPL
752748	2015 TR_{34}	—	May 23, 2014	Haleakala	Pan-STARRS 1	·	2.2 km	MPC · JPL
752749	2015 TY_{34}	—	October 1, 2011	Mount Lemmon	Mount Lemmon Survey	·	1.2 km	MPC · JPL
752750	2015 TP_{38}	—	March 10, 2014	Mount Lemmon	Mount Lemmon Survey	·	1.6 km	MPC · JPL
752751	2015 TA_{40}	—	July 27, 2011	Haleakala	Pan-STARRS 1	·	1.1 km	MPC · JPL
752752	2015 TZ_{43}	—	September 19, 2006	Kitt Peak	Spacewatch	·	1.3 km	MPC · JPL
752753	2015 TU_{46}	—	October 4, 2011	Piszkés-tető	K. Sárneczky, S. Kürti	·	1.2 km	MPC · JPL
752754	2015 TH_{47}	—	September 28, 2008	Mount Lemmon	Mount Lemmon Survey	V	490 m	MPC · JPL
752755	2015 TS_{47}	—	September 20, 2011	Kitt Peak	Spacewatch	·	870 m	MPC · JPL
752756	2015 TO_{48}	—	September 19, 2006	Catalina	CSS	MRX	750 m	MPC · JPL
752757	2015 TX_{51}	—	June 21, 2015	Haleakala	Pan-STARRS 1	·	1.3 km	MPC · JPL
752758	2015 TS_{53}	—	July 23, 2015	Haleakala	Pan-STARRS 1	·	2.5 km	MPC · JPL
752759	2015 TU_{56}	—	April 17, 2013	Cerro Tololo	DECam	·	2.2 km	MPC · JPL
752760	2015 TZ_{56}	—	August 18, 2006	Palomar	NEAT	·	1.3 km	MPC · JPL
752761	2015 TC_{57}	—	April 29, 2014	Tenerife	ESA OGS	·	1.5 km	MPC · JPL
752762	2015 TK_{57}	—	February 15, 2013	Haleakala	Pan-STARRS 1	·	1.6 km	MPC · JPL
752763	2015 TL_{57}	—	October 25, 2011	Haleakala	Pan-STARRS 1	·	1.4 km	MPC · JPL
752764	2015 TD_{61}	—	October 20, 2011	Mount Lemmon	Mount Lemmon Survey	·	1.4 km	MPC · JPL
752765	2015 TF_{63}	—	September 4, 2011	Haleakala	Pan-STARRS 1	NYS	850 m	MPC · JPL
752766	2015 TL_{63}	—	September 9, 2015	Haleakala	Pan-STARRS 1	·	1.5 km	MPC · JPL
752767	2015 TL_{65}	—	September 9, 2015	Haleakala	Pan-STARRS 1	·	1.6 km	MPC · JPL
752768	2015 TJ_{69}	—	September 9, 2015	Haleakala	Pan-STARRS 1	·	1.4 km	MPC · JPL
752769	2015 TB_{70}	—	November 24, 2011	Haleakala	Pan-STARRS 1	·	1.2 km	MPC · JPL
752770	2015 TZ_{70}	—	October 8, 2015	Haleakala	Pan-STARRS 1	·	2.7 km	MPC · JPL
752771	2015 TE_{73}	—	October 23, 2000	La Silla	Barbieri, C.	·	1.3 km	MPC · JPL
752772	2015 TS_{73}	—	October 8, 2015	Haleakala	Pan-STARRS 1	·	2.3 km	MPC · JPL
752773	2015 TF_{74}	—	September 28, 2006	Mount Lemmon	Mount Lemmon Survey	·	1.1 km	MPC · JPL
752774	2015 TX_{74}	—	August 12, 2010	Kitt Peak	Spacewatch	·	1.4 km	MPC · JPL
752775	2015 TQ_{75}	—	October 10, 2007	Kitt Peak	Spacewatch	·	760 m	MPC · JPL
752776	2015 TR_{76}	—	April 10, 2013	Haleakala	Pan-STARRS 1	·	1.8 km	MPC · JPL
752777	2015 TT_{76}	—	October 10, 2004	Kitt Peak	Spacewatch	·	2.1 km	MPC · JPL
752778	2015 TT_{77}	—	December 25, 2005	Kitt Peak	Spacewatch	·	1.9 km	MPC · JPL
752779	2015 TQ_{78}	—	May 27, 2014	Haleakala	Pan-STARRS 1	·	1.8 km	MPC · JPL
752780	2015 TR_{78}	—	October 7, 2004	Kitt Peak	Spacewatch	THM	1.8 km	MPC · JPL
752781	2015 TJ_{79}	—	October 18, 2001	Palomar	NEAT	·	1.5 km	MPC · JPL
752782	2015 TS_{79}	—	April 10, 2005	Mount Lemmon	Mount Lemmon Survey	·	1.3 km	MPC · JPL
752783	2015 TU_{81}	—	December 29, 2011	Mount Lemmon	Mount Lemmon Survey	·	1.2 km	MPC · JPL
752784	2015 TX_{81}	—	September 9, 2015	Haleakala	Pan-STARRS 1	·	1.2 km	MPC · JPL
752785	2015 TW_{85}	—	April 29, 2014	Haleakala	Pan-STARRS 1	NYS	1.0 km	MPC · JPL
752786	2015 TR_{88}	—	September 9, 2015	Haleakala	Pan-STARRS 1	MAR	990 m	MPC · JPL
752787	2015 TV_{92}	—	January 29, 2003	Apache Point	SDSS	·	1.4 km	MPC · JPL
752788	2015 TW_{92}	—	September 26, 2002	Palomar	NEAT	·	1.2 km	MPC · JPL
752789	2015 TC_{93}	—	September 9, 2015	Haleakala	Pan-STARRS 1	·	1.6 km	MPC · JPL
752790	2015 TH_{93}	—	March 31, 2008	Mount Lemmon	Mount Lemmon Survey	·	1.8 km	MPC · JPL
752791	2015 TC_{96}	—	July 25, 2014	Haleakala	Pan-STARRS 1	·	1.2 km	MPC · JPL
752792	2015 TM_{97}	—	December 1, 2006	Mount Lemmon	Mount Lemmon Survey	MRX	760 m	MPC · JPL
752793	2015 TY_{97}	—	September 9, 2015	Haleakala	Pan-STARRS 1	·	1.5 km	MPC · JPL
752794	2015 TW_{100}	—	January 19, 2012	Kitt Peak	Spacewatch	DOR	1.9 km	MPC · JPL
752795	2015 TR_{101}	—	April 30, 2005	Kitt Peak	Spacewatch	·	1.9 km	MPC · JPL
752796	2015 TA_{107}	—	October 8, 2015	Haleakala	Pan-STARRS 1	·	2.9 km	MPC · JPL
752797	2015 TO_{110}	—	October 8, 2015	Haleakala	Pan-STARRS 1	·	1.5 km	MPC · JPL
752798	2015 TW_{110}	—	May 21, 2014	Haleakala	Pan-STARRS 1	·	1 km	MPC · JPL
752799	2015 TM_{113}	—	October 8, 2015	Haleakala	Pan-STARRS 1	·	1.2 km	MPC · JPL
752800	2015 TR_{113}	—	December 21, 2006	Catalina	CSS	·	1.4 km	MPC · JPL

== 752801–752900 ==
back to top

Designation			Discovery			Properties		Ref
Permanent	Provisional	Named after	Date	Site	Discoverer(s)	Category	Diam.	Ref
752801	2015 TA_{115}	—	September 21, 2011	Mount Lemmon	Mount Lemmon Survey	·	850 m	MPC · JPL
752802	2015 TE_{116}	—	January 27, 2011	Mount Lemmon	Mount Lemmon Survey	·	2.4 km	MPC · JPL
752803	2015 TP_{117}	—	October 8, 2015	Haleakala	Pan-STARRS 1	·	2.2 km	MPC · JPL
752804	2015 TD_{119}	—	October 8, 2015	Haleakala	Pan-STARRS 1	MAR	800 m	MPC · JPL
752805	2015 TV_{119}	—	October 8, 2015	Haleakala	Pan-STARRS 1	·	1.4 km	MPC · JPL
752806	2015 TV_{120}	—	March 8, 2013	Haleakala	Pan-STARRS 1	·	1.3 km	MPC · JPL
752807	2015 TU_{123}	—	October 8, 2015	Haleakala	Pan-STARRS 1	·	1.4 km	MPC · JPL
752808	2015 TQ_{124}	—	March 21, 2001	Kitt Peak	SKADS	·	1.0 km	MPC · JPL
752809	2015 TR_{125}	—	November 22, 2006	Kitt Peak	Spacewatch	·	1.5 km	MPC · JPL
752810	2015 TQ_{131}	—	October 8, 2015	Haleakala	Pan-STARRS 1	·	1.3 km	MPC · JPL
752811	2015 TP_{133}	—	September 1, 2010	Mount Lemmon	Mount Lemmon Survey	·	1.3 km	MPC · JPL
752812	2015 TT_{133}	—	September 12, 2015	Haleakala	Pan-STARRS 1	·	1.6 km	MPC · JPL
752813	2015 TE_{134}	—	September 12, 2015	Haleakala	Pan-STARRS 1	·	1.1 km	MPC · JPL
752814	2015 TC_{135}	—	June 30, 2014	Haleakala	Pan-STARRS 1	·	1.5 km	MPC · JPL
752815	2015 TG_{135}	—	October 23, 2011	Haleakala	Pan-STARRS 1	·	1.3 km	MPC · JPL
752816	2015 TE_{137}	—	May 28, 2014	Haleakala	Pan-STARRS 1	·	1.7 km	MPC · JPL
752817	2015 TM_{137}	—	October 8, 2015	Haleakala	Pan-STARRS 1	·	1.3 km	MPC · JPL
752818	2015 TG_{138}	—	October 8, 2015	Haleakala	Pan-STARRS 1	·	1.1 km	MPC · JPL
752819	2015 TY_{141}	—	January 26, 2012	Mount Lemmon	Mount Lemmon Survey	GEF	910 m	MPC · JPL
752820	2015 TV_{142}	—	May 15, 2013	Haleakala	Pan-STARRS 1	EOS	1.4 km	MPC · JPL
752821	2015 TE_{148}	—	August 12, 2015	Haleakala	Pan-STARRS 1	·	1.4 km	MPC · JPL
752822	2015 TM_{148}	—	March 19, 2013	Haleakala	Pan-STARRS 1	·	970 m	MPC · JPL
752823	2015 TQ_{149}	—	March 19, 2013	Haleakala	Pan-STARRS 1	·	1.4 km	MPC · JPL
752824	2015 TD_{150}	—	October 11, 2007	Kitt Peak	Spacewatch	·	760 m	MPC · JPL
752825	2015 TE_{151}	—	November 3, 2005	Mount Lemmon	Mount Lemmon Survey	·	1.4 km	MPC · JPL
752826	2015 TM_{151}	—	February 15, 2013	Haleakala	Pan-STARRS 1	·	1.3 km	MPC · JPL
752827	2015 TK_{152}	—	August 28, 2006	Kitt Peak	Spacewatch	·	1.3 km	MPC · JPL
752828	2015 TH_{158}	—	September 12, 2015	Haleakala	Pan-STARRS 1	·	1.2 km	MPC · JPL
752829	2015 TE_{159}	—	September 11, 2015	Haleakala	Pan-STARRS 1	AGN	920 m	MPC · JPL
752830	2015 TA_{160}	—	September 18, 2006	Kitt Peak	Spacewatch	MRX	810 m	MPC · JPL
752831	2015 TK_{160}	—	August 23, 2001	Kitt Peak	Spacewatch	HOF	1.9 km	MPC · JPL
752832	2015 TB_{161}	—	September 9, 2015	Haleakala	Pan-STARRS 1	·	1.3 km	MPC · JPL
752833	2015 TJ_{171}	—	November 11, 2006	Mount Lemmon	Mount Lemmon Survey	·	1.3 km	MPC · JPL
752834	2015 TW_{172}	—	October 9, 2015	Haleakala	Pan-STARRS 1	·	960 m	MPC · JPL
752835	2015 TJ_{174}	—	October 9, 2015	Haleakala	Pan-STARRS 1	·	1.5 km	MPC · JPL
752836	2015 TC_{182}	—	July 28, 2015	Haleakala	Pan-STARRS 1	·	1.2 km	MPC · JPL
752837	2015 TD_{183}	—	November 8, 2012	Haleakala	Pan-STARRS 1	·	700 m	MPC · JPL
752838	2015 TR_{187}	—	December 18, 2004	Mount Lemmon	Mount Lemmon Survey	·	2.1 km	MPC · JPL
752839	2015 TN_{190}	—	September 20, 2015	Catalina	CSS	·	1.0 km	MPC · JPL
752840	2015 TV_{191}	—	March 11, 2005	Mount Lemmon	Mount Lemmon Survey	·	1.5 km	MPC · JPL
752841	2015 TX_{192}	—	September 4, 2007	Mount Lemmon	Mount Lemmon Survey	·	900 m	MPC · JPL
752842	2015 TO_{194}	—	October 3, 2015	Catalina	CSS	·	1.6 km	MPC · JPL
752843	2015 TU_{194}	—	September 12, 2015	Haleakala	Pan-STARRS 1	·	1.2 km	MPC · JPL
752844	2015 TW_{196}	—	October 31, 2006	Kitt Peak	Spacewatch	·	1.4 km	MPC · JPL
752845	2015 TM_{197}	—	April 20, 2010	WISE	WISE	·	1.8 km	MPC · JPL
752846	2015 TT_{198}	—	September 25, 2015	Haleakala	Pan-STARRS 1	·	2.2 km	MPC · JPL
752847	2015 TT_{199}	—	October 15, 2004	Mount Lemmon	Mount Lemmon Survey	·	2.4 km	MPC · JPL
752848	2015 TD_{200}	—	September 16, 2006	Catalina	CSS	·	1.4 km	MPC · JPL
752849	2015 TF_{200}	—	September 10, 2005	Anderson Mesa	LONEOS	·	640 m	MPC · JPL
752850	2015 TO_{201}	—	March 19, 2009	Mount Lemmon	Mount Lemmon Survey	·	1.3 km	MPC · JPL
752851	2015 TN_{202}	—	February 9, 2013	Haleakala	Pan-STARRS 1	ERI	1.2 km	MPC · JPL
752852	2015 TT_{202}	—	October 27, 1998	Kitt Peak	Spacewatch	·	1.3 km	MPC · JPL
752853	2015 TC_{205}	—	September 28, 2006	Mount Lemmon	Mount Lemmon Survey	·	1.7 km	MPC · JPL
752854	2015 TR_{206}	—	October 24, 2011	Haleakala	Pan-STARRS 1	·	1.1 km	MPC · JPL
752855	2015 TR_{208}	—	October 10, 2015	Catalina	CSS	DOR	2.0 km	MPC · JPL
752856	2015 TX_{208}	—	October 10, 2015	Atom Site	Space Surveillance Telescope	LIX	2.6 km	MPC · JPL
752857	2015 TB_{210}	—	September 9, 2015	Haleakala	Pan-STARRS 1	·	1.8 km	MPC · JPL
752858	2015 TM_{211}	—	September 25, 2006	Mount Lemmon	Mount Lemmon Survey	·	1.3 km	MPC · JPL
752859	2015 TG_{214}	—	May 4, 1994	Kitt Peak	Spacewatch	·	840 m	MPC · JPL
752860	2015 TY_{215}	—	October 19, 2011	Mount Lemmon	Mount Lemmon Survey	·	800 m	MPC · JPL
752861	2015 TL_{217}	—	September 14, 2005	Kitt Peak	Spacewatch	·	490 m	MPC · JPL
752862	2015 TQ_{219}	—	September 12, 2015	Haleakala	Pan-STARRS 1	·	1.2 km	MPC · JPL
752863	2015 TS_{220}	—	March 26, 2008	Mount Lemmon	Mount Lemmon Survey	·	1.4 km	MPC · JPL
752864	2015 TT_{225}	—	April 6, 2014	Mount Lemmon	Mount Lemmon Survey	·	1.4 km	MPC · JPL
752865	2015 TV_{225}	—	October 10, 2015	Haleakala	Pan-STARRS 1	·	1.4 km	MPC · JPL
752866	2015 TS_{226}	—	December 3, 2010	Kitt Peak	Spacewatch	·	2.3 km	MPC · JPL
752867	2015 TC_{228}	—	March 17, 2013	Palomar	Palomar Transient Factory	HNS	890 m	MPC · JPL
752868	2015 TN_{228}	—	September 8, 2015	Haleakala	Pan-STARRS 1	·	1.1 km	MPC · JPL
752869	2015 TD_{230}	—	September 9, 2009	Bisei	BATTeRS	·	2.0 km	MPC · JPL
752870	2015 TZ_{230}	—	April 5, 2014	Haleakala	Pan-STARRS 1	H	530 m	MPC · JPL
752871	2015 TD_{231}	—	February 18, 2013	Kitt Peak	Spacewatch	EUN	1.3 km	MPC · JPL
752872	2015 TB_{234}	—	November 14, 2010	Wildberg	R. Apitzsch	TIR	2.8 km	MPC · JPL
752873	2015 TQ_{234}	—	October 11, 2015	Mount Lemmon	Mount Lemmon Survey	·	1.4 km	MPC · JPL
752874	2015 TW_{235}	—	December 5, 2010	Mount Lemmon	Mount Lemmon Survey	·	1.9 km	MPC · JPL
752875	2015 TF_{236}	—	May 30, 2014	Haleakala	Pan-STARRS 1	·	1.4 km	MPC · JPL
752876	2015 TO_{236}	—	July 21, 2006	Mount Lemmon	Mount Lemmon Survey	·	1.9 km	MPC · JPL
752877	2015 TO_{237}	—	October 10, 2015	Haleakala	Pan-STARRS 1	APO	650 m	MPC · JPL
752878	2015 TQ_{240}	—	September 25, 2006	Kitt Peak	Spacewatch	·	1.4 km	MPC · JPL
752879	2015 TY_{241}	—	October 14, 2007	Catalina	CSS	·	840 m	MPC · JPL
752880	2015 TH_{242}	—	February 16, 2012	Haleakala	Pan-STARRS 1	·	1.7 km	MPC · JPL
752881	2015 TX_{244}	—	March 5, 2013	Haleakala	Pan-STARRS 1	AGN	950 m	MPC · JPL
752882	2015 TO_{248}	—	October 2, 2006	Mount Lemmon	Mount Lemmon Survey	·	1.3 km	MPC · JPL
752883	2015 TN_{249}	—	October 10, 2010	Mount Lemmon	Mount Lemmon Survey	·	1.8 km	MPC · JPL
752884	2015 TZ_{250}	—	October 8, 2004	Socorro	LINEAR	·	2.0 km	MPC · JPL
752885	2015 TH_{251}	—	April 30, 2014	Haleakala	Pan-STARRS 1	DOR	1.8 km	MPC · JPL
752886	2015 TB_{254}	—	October 8, 2007	Mount Lemmon	Mount Lemmon Survey	·	690 m	MPC · JPL
752887	2015 TU_{254}	—	December 6, 2011	Haleakala	Pan-STARRS 1	·	1.4 km	MPC · JPL
752888	2015 TO_{256}	—	September 14, 2006	Catalina	CSS	EUN	1.1 km	MPC · JPL
752889	2015 TV_{257}	—	September 20, 2015	Catalina	CSS	·	2.8 km	MPC · JPL
752890	2015 TJ_{258}	—	April 24, 2009	Mount Lemmon	Mount Lemmon Survey	H	490 m	MPC · JPL
752891	2015 TF_{260}	—	October 6, 2008	Catalina	CSS	·	630 m	MPC · JPL
752892	2015 TE_{262}	—	October 31, 2010	Mount Lemmon	Mount Lemmon Survey	·	2.2 km	MPC · JPL
752893	2015 TG_{264}	—	September 20, 2011	Haleakala	Pan-STARRS 1	·	1.2 km	MPC · JPL
752894	2015 TU_{265}	—	June 26, 2015	Haleakala	Pan-STARRS 1	·	1.4 km	MPC · JPL
752895	2015 TW_{267}	—	October 12, 2015	Haleakala	Pan-STARRS 1	·	1.7 km	MPC · JPL
752896	2015 TV_{270}	—	April 5, 2014	Haleakala	Pan-STARRS 1	·	1.3 km	MPC · JPL
752897	2015 TC_{274}	—	February 25, 2007	Mount Lemmon	Mount Lemmon Survey	·	1.9 km	MPC · JPL
752898	2015 TB_{277}	—	August 10, 2009	Kitt Peak	Spacewatch	·	1.9 km	MPC · JPL
752899	2015 TH_{277}	—	February 14, 2013	Nogales	M. Schwartz, P. R. Holvorcem	JUN	920 m	MPC · JPL
752900	2015 TM_{277}	—	November 17, 2008	Kitt Peak	Spacewatch	·	1.2 km	MPC · JPL

== 752901–753000 ==
back to top

Designation			Discovery			Properties		Ref
Permanent	Provisional	Named after	Date	Site	Discoverer(s)	Category	Diam.	Ref
752901	2015 TK_{280}	—	October 3, 2015	Mount Lemmon	Mount Lemmon Survey	·	580 m	MPC · JPL
752902	2015 TO_{288}	—	July 25, 2015	Haleakala	Pan-STARRS 1	·	1.3 km	MPC · JPL
752903	2015 TS_{289}	—	October 12, 2015	Atom Site	Space Surveillance Telescope	MAR	1.0 km	MPC · JPL
752904	2015 TM_{291}	—	October 25, 2011	Kitt Peak	Spacewatch	·	1.1 km	MPC · JPL
752905	2015 TT_{292}	—	August 27, 2006	Kitt Peak	Spacewatch	·	890 m	MPC · JPL
752906	2015 TP_{293}	—	April 4, 2008	Kitt Peak	Spacewatch	·	1.5 km	MPC · JPL
752907	2015 TT_{294}	—	October 8, 2015	Tenerife	ESA OGS	·	580 m	MPC · JPL
752908	2015 TX_{294}	—	January 19, 2012	Mount Lemmon	Mount Lemmon Survey	·	1.5 km	MPC · JPL
752909	2015 TD_{298}	—	September 16, 2006	Catalina	CSS	·	1.5 km	MPC · JPL
752910	2015 TE_{300}	—	April 29, 2014	Haleakala	Pan-STARRS 1	·	620 m	MPC · JPL
752911	2015 TQ_{303}	—	October 22, 2006	Kitt Peak	Spacewatch	·	1.8 km	MPC · JPL
752912	2015 TE_{306}	—	September 23, 2015	Haleakala	Pan-STARRS 1	·	1.0 km	MPC · JPL
752913	2015 TH_{306}	—	August 21, 2015	Haleakala	Pan-STARRS 1	·	1.5 km	MPC · JPL
752914	2015 TL_{306}	—	October 15, 2007	Kitt Peak	Spacewatch	·	1.1 km	MPC · JPL
752915	2015 TP_{309}	—	January 11, 2008	Mount Lemmon	Mount Lemmon Survey	·	1.4 km	MPC · JPL
752916	2015 TW_{310}	—	November 18, 2011	Mount Lemmon	Mount Lemmon Survey	EUN	990 m	MPC · JPL
752917	2015 TL_{311}	—	October 4, 2012	Haleakala	Pan-STARRS 1	H	660 m	MPC · JPL
752918	2015 TK_{312}	—	August 13, 2002	Palomar	NEAT	·	1.1 km	MPC · JPL
752919	2015 TP_{312}	—	October 3, 2015	Mount Lemmon	Mount Lemmon Survey	·	1.9 km	MPC · JPL
752920	2015 TL_{314}	—	October 3, 2002	Socorro	LINEAR	·	540 m	MPC · JPL
752921	2015 TP_{318}	—	November 25, 2011	Haleakala	Pan-STARRS 1	·	1.6 km	MPC · JPL
752922	2015 TL_{320}	—	September 17, 2006	Kitt Peak	Spacewatch	EUN	890 m	MPC · JPL
752923	2015 TA_{321}	—	July 25, 2015	Haleakala	Pan-STARRS 1	·	1.4 km	MPC · JPL
752924	2015 TL_{323}	—	December 28, 2011	Mount Lemmon	Mount Lemmon Survey	·	1.3 km	MPC · JPL
752925	2015 TQ_{323}	—	October 12, 2015	Haleakala	Pan-STARRS 1	·	1.2 km	MPC · JPL
752926	2015 TB_{324}	—	February 8, 2008	Kitt Peak	Spacewatch	·	1.5 km	MPC · JPL
752927	2015 TU_{327}	—	April 8, 2014	Mount Lemmon	Mount Lemmon Survey	TIN	690 m	MPC · JPL
752928	2015 TK_{330}	—	May 17, 2014	Haleakala	Pan-STARRS 1	EUN	920 m	MPC · JPL
752929	2015 TF_{334}	—	October 13, 2015	Haleakala	Pan-STARRS 1	·	1.6 km	MPC · JPL
752930	2015 TB_{335}	—	October 23, 2011	Haleakala	Pan-STARRS 1	·	1.3 km	MPC · JPL
752931	2015 TJ_{340}	—	October 15, 2015	Haleakala	Pan-STARRS 1	EUN	1.1 km	MPC · JPL
752932	2015 TQ_{341}	—	October 15, 2015	Haleakala	Pan-STARRS 1	·	1.8 km	MPC · JPL
752933	2015 TE_{343}	—	September 16, 2015	ISON-SSO	L. Elenin	·	1.6 km	MPC · JPL
752934	2015 TT_{344}	—	May 6, 2014	Mount Lemmon	Mount Lemmon Survey	·	970 m	MPC · JPL
752935	2015 TC_{347}	—	September 9, 2015	Haleakala	Pan-STARRS 1	·	1.4 km	MPC · JPL
752936	2015 TX_{347}	—	September 9, 2015	Haleakala	Pan-STARRS 1	·	1.5 km	MPC · JPL
752937	2015 TB_{360}	—	October 3, 2006	Mount Lemmon	Mount Lemmon Survey	·	990 m	MPC · JPL
752938	2015 TL_{360}	—	October 10, 2015	Haleakala	Pan-STARRS 1	·	1.6 km	MPC · JPL
752939	2015 TO_{360}	—	November 19, 2006	Kitt Peak	Spacewatch	DOR	1.9 km	MPC · JPL
752940	2015 TX_{364}	—	October 10, 2015	Haleakala	Pan-STARRS 1	EUN	1.0 km	MPC · JPL
752941	2015 TQ_{370}	—	September 10, 2010	Mount Lemmon	Mount Lemmon Survey	·	1.7 km	MPC · JPL
752942	2015 TB_{371}	—	May 23, 2014	Haleakala	Pan-STARRS 1	MAR	760 m	MPC · JPL
752943	2015 TD_{371}	—	October 21, 2011	Mount Lemmon	Mount Lemmon Survey	·	1.2 km	MPC · JPL
752944	2015 TW_{373}	—	July 25, 2014	Haleakala	Pan-STARRS 1	·	2.4 km	MPC · JPL
752945	2015 TE_{374}	—	July 1, 2014	Haleakala	Pan-STARRS 1	·	1.3 km	MPC · JPL
752946	2015 TF_{374}	—	July 25, 2014	Haleakala	Pan-STARRS 1	MAR	870 m	MPC · JPL
752947	2015 TQ_{376}	—	May 23, 2014	Haleakala	Pan-STARRS 1	KON	1.7 km	MPC · JPL
752948	2015 TZ_{376}	—	January 12, 2011	Mount Lemmon	Mount Lemmon Survey	·	1.9 km	MPC · JPL
752949	2015 TW_{377}	—	July 25, 2015	Haleakala	Pan-STARRS 1	ADE	1.5 km	MPC · JPL
752950	2015 TR_{378}	—	March 5, 2013	Mount Lemmon	Mount Lemmon Survey	KON	1.9 km	MPC · JPL
752951	2015 TY_{378}	—	July 29, 2014	Haleakala	Pan-STARRS 1	·	1.9 km	MPC · JPL
752952	2015 TR_{380}	—	October 10, 2015	Haleakala	Pan-STARRS 1	·	1.6 km	MPC · JPL
752953	2015 TV_{381}	—	June 24, 2014	Mount Lemmon	Mount Lemmon Survey	·	1.5 km	MPC · JPL
752954	2015 TW_{382}	—	September 15, 2009	Kitt Peak	Spacewatch	·	2.2 km	MPC · JPL
752955	2015 TS_{383}	—	October 11, 2015	Mount Lemmon	Mount Lemmon Survey	·	1.3 km	MPC · JPL
752956	2015 TY_{386}	—	February 28, 2006	Mount Lemmon	Mount Lemmon Survey	·	2.5 km	MPC · JPL
752957	2015 TZ_{386}	—	October 12, 2015	Haleakala	Pan-STARRS 1	·	2.6 km	MPC · JPL
752958	2015 TT_{387}	—	October 3, 2015	Haleakala	Pan-STARRS 1	·	1.6 km	MPC · JPL
752959	2015 TJ_{388}	—	October 11, 2015	Mount Lemmon	Mount Lemmon Survey	DOR	1.9 km	MPC · JPL
752960	2015 TV_{393}	—	October 9, 2015	Haleakala	Pan-STARRS 1	·	1.0 km	MPC · JPL
752961	2015 TM_{410}	—	October 8, 2015	Haleakala	Pan-STARRS 1	·	1.2 km	MPC · JPL
752962	2015 TJ_{411}	—	October 15, 2015	Haleakala	Pan-STARRS 1	·	1.4 km	MPC · JPL
752963	2015 TQ_{436}	—	November 6, 2010	Mount Lemmon	Mount Lemmon Survey	·	1.5 km	MPC · JPL
752964	2015 TG_{437}	—	October 11, 2015	Mount Lemmon	Mount Lemmon Survey	·	1.5 km	MPC · JPL
752965	2015 TE_{444}	—	October 1, 2015	Mount Lemmon	Mount Lemmon Survey	AGN	780 m	MPC · JPL
752966	2015 TP_{446}	—	October 9, 2015	Haleakala	Pan-STARRS 1	AGN	760 m	MPC · JPL
752967	2015 UJ	—	September 13, 2004	Palomar	NEAT	·	1.0 km	MPC · JPL
752968	2015 UP_{1}	—	August 12, 2004	Cerro Tololo	Deep Ecliptic Survey	·	770 m	MPC · JPL
752969	2015 UB_{10}	—	August 21, 2006	Kitt Peak	Spacewatch	·	1.1 km	MPC · JPL
752970	2015 UP_{11}	—	September 21, 2008	Mount Lemmon	Mount Lemmon Survey	·	830 m	MPC · JPL
752971	2015 UK_{12}	—	October 1, 2011	Mount Lemmon	Mount Lemmon Survey	·	1.5 km	MPC · JPL
752972	2015 UA_{13}	—	September 12, 2015	Haleakala	Pan-STARRS 1	THM	1.8 km	MPC · JPL
752973	2015 UE_{25}	—	March 15, 2013	Kitt Peak	Spacewatch	·	1.7 km	MPC · JPL
752974	2015 UJ_{26}	—	November 3, 2010	Kitt Peak	Spacewatch	TIR	3.0 km	MPC · JPL
752975	2015 UV_{32}	—	October 20, 2011	Mount Lemmon	Mount Lemmon Survey	·	680 m	MPC · JPL
752976	2015 UL_{34}	—	January 11, 2008	Kitt Peak	Spacewatch	·	1.2 km	MPC · JPL
752977	2015 UW_{36}	—	June 23, 2014	Mount Lemmon	Mount Lemmon Survey	·	1.6 km	MPC · JPL
752978	2015 UW_{42}	—	April 17, 2009	Mount Lemmon	Mount Lemmon Survey	HNS	880 m	MPC · JPL
752979	2015 UA_{46}	—	October 18, 2015	Haleakala	Pan-STARRS 1	·	1.5 km	MPC · JPL
752980	2015 UE_{46}	—	September 12, 2015	Haleakala	Pan-STARRS 1	·	1.6 km	MPC · JPL
752981	2015 UN_{46}	—	July 1, 2014	Haleakala	Pan-STARRS 1	·	1.6 km	MPC · JPL
752982	2015 UO_{46}	—	August 22, 2014	Haleakala	Pan-STARRS 1	BRA	1.2 km	MPC · JPL
752983	2015 UN_{49}	—	October 8, 2015	Haleakala	Pan-STARRS 1	·	1.6 km	MPC · JPL
752984	2015 UV_{55}	—	February 13, 2008	Kitt Peak	Spacewatch	·	1.3 km	MPC · JPL
752985	2015 UC_{58}	—	October 19, 2015	Haleakala	Pan-STARRS 1	·	1.8 km	MPC · JPL
752986	2015 UF_{59}	—	November 8, 2007	Mount Lemmon	Mount Lemmon Survey	EUN	660 m	MPC · JPL
752987	2015 UF_{61}	—	August 3, 2014	Haleakala	Pan-STARRS 1	GAL	1.1 km	MPC · JPL
752988	2015 UQ_{61}	—	May 6, 2014	Haleakala	Pan-STARRS 1	·	2.4 km	MPC · JPL
752989	2015 UW_{62}	—	February 28, 2014	Haleakala	Pan-STARRS 1	(194)	1.1 km	MPC · JPL
752990	2015 UY_{62}	—	August 3, 2015	Haleakala	Pan-STARRS 1	·	3.6 km	MPC · JPL
752991	2015 UQ_{63}	—	January 21, 2006	Mount Lemmon	Mount Lemmon Survey	·	2.3 km	MPC · JPL
752992	2015 UK_{64}	—	January 18, 2008	Mount Lemmon	Mount Lemmon Survey	HNS	1.1 km	MPC · JPL
752993	2015 UA_{68}	—	September 9, 2015	Haleakala	Pan-STARRS 1	THM	2.0 km	MPC · JPL
752994	2015 UC_{68}	—	November 1, 2011	Mount Lemmon	Mount Lemmon Survey	·	1.4 km	MPC · JPL
752995	2015 US_{69}	—	May 21, 2014	Haleakala	Pan-STARRS 1	·	1.4 km	MPC · JPL
752996	2015 UK_{70}	—	January 31, 2008	Catalina	CSS	·	1.6 km	MPC · JPL
752997	2015 UY_{70}	—	November 4, 2005	Mount Lemmon	Mount Lemmon Survey	·	1.6 km	MPC · JPL
752998	2015 US_{72}	—	August 28, 2015	Haleakala	Pan-STARRS 1	·	1.3 km	MPC · JPL
752999	2015 UP_{76}	—	December 1, 2006	Mount Lemmon	Mount Lemmon Survey	·	1.4 km	MPC · JPL
753000	2015 UA_{77}	—	October 24, 2015	Haleakala	Pan-STARRS 1	·	1.5 km	MPC · JPL

back to top

== Meaning of names ==
As minor planet discoveries are confirmed, they are given a permanent number by the IAU's Minor Planet Center (MPC), and the discoverers can then submit names for them, following the IAU's naming conventions. The list below concerns those minor planets in the specified number-range that have received names, and explains the meanings of those names.

Official naming citations of newly named small Solar System bodies are approved and published in a bulletin by IAU's Working Group for Small Bodies Nomenclature (WGSBN). Before May 2021, citations were published in MPC's Minor Planet Circulars for many decades. Recent citations can also be found on the JPL Small-Body Database (SBDB). Until his death in 2016, German astronomer Lutz D. Schmadel compiled these citations into the Dictionary of Minor Planet Names (DMP) and regularly updated the collection.

Based on Paul Herget's The Names of the Minor Planets, Schmadel also researched the unclear origin of numerous asteroids, most of which had been named prior to World War II. This article incorporates text from this source, which is in the public domain: SBDB New namings may only be added to this list below after official publication as the preannouncement of names is condemned. The WGSBN publishes a comprehensive guideline for the naming rules of non-cometary small Solar System bodies.

Named minor planet	Provisional	This minor planet was named for...	Ref · Catalog
752263 Franciscosánchez	2015 OU_{26}	Francisco Sánchez Martínez (born 1936), Spanish astrophysicist and founder and first director of the Instituto de Astrofísica de Canarias and its observatories.	IAU · 752263
752403 Bayurisanto	2015 PZ_{114}	Christoforus Bayu Risanto (b. 1981), Indonesian Jesuit priest whose research focuses on meteorology.	IAU · 752403
