= List of minor planets: 360001–361000 =

The following is a partial list of minor planets, running from minor-planet number 360001 through 361000, inclusive. The primary data for this and other partial lists is based on JPL's "Small-Body Orbital Elements" and data available from the Minor Planet Center. Critical list information is also provided by the MPC, unless otherwise specified from Lowell Observatory. A detailed description of the table's columns and additional sources are given on the main page including a complete list of every page in this series, and a statistical break-up on the dynamical classification of minor planets.

Also see the summary list of all named bodies in numerical and alphabetical order, and the corresponding naming citations for the number range of this particular list. New namings may only be added to this list after official publication, as the preannouncement of names is condemned by the Working Group for Small Bodies Nomenclature of the International Astronomical Union.

Near-Earth obj.	MBA (inner)	MBA (outer)	Centaur
Mars-crosser	MBA (middle)	Jupiter trojan	Trans-Neptunian obj.
Unclassified

== 360001–360100 ==
Designation			Discovery			Properties		Ref
Permanent	Provisional	Named after	Date	Site	Discoverer(s)	Category	Diam.	Ref
360001	2012 XS_{39}	—	September 15, 2006	Kitt Peak	Spacewatch	·	2.5 km	MPC · JPL
360002	2012 XJ_{115}	—	May 7, 2002	Palomar	NEAT	MAR	1.7 km	MPC · JPL
360003	2012 XP_{133}	—	July 5, 2003	Kitt Peak	Spacewatch	(5)	1.8 km	MPC · JPL
360004	2012 XO_{146}	—	March 24, 2006	Kitt Peak	Spacewatch	·	1.5 km	MPC · JPL
360005	2012 XA_{151}	—	December 21, 2003	Kitt Peak	Spacewatch	·	1.8 km	MPC · JPL
360006	2012 XH_{151}	—	September 17, 2006	Kitt Peak	Spacewatch	·	3.3 km	MPC · JPL
360007	2012 XU_{151}	—	May 9, 2005	Kitt Peak	Spacewatch	·	2.5 km	MPC · JPL
360008	2012 YR	—	September 12, 2007	Dauban	C. Rinner, Kugel, F.	·	2.0 km	MPC · JPL
360009	2012 YP_{5}	—	February 12, 1999	Socorro	LINEAR	·	1.7 km	MPC · JPL
360010	2012 YB_{6}	—	October 21, 2007	Mount Lemmon	Mount Lemmon Survey	·	1.5 km	MPC · JPL
360011	2013 AK_{7}	—	April 17, 1998	Kitt Peak	Spacewatch	·	1.3 km	MPC · JPL
360012	2013 AL_{7}	—	January 9, 2002	Socorro	LINEAR	·	3.5 km	MPC · JPL
360013	2013 AN_{7}	—	March 18, 2004	Kitt Peak	Spacewatch	·	2.2 km	MPC · JPL
360014	2013 AQ_{7}	—	December 2, 2008	Kitt Peak	Spacewatch	·	1.5 km	MPC · JPL
360015	2013 AX_{7}	—	October 29, 2005	Catalina	CSS	·	800 m	MPC · JPL
360016	2013 AG_{8}	—	February 12, 2004	Kitt Peak	Spacewatch	·	2.6 km	MPC · JPL
360017	2013 AU_{10}	—	February 10, 2002	Socorro	LINEAR	·	3.8 km	MPC · JPL
360018	2013 AF_{13}	—	November 21, 2003	Kitt Peak	Spacewatch	·	1.7 km	MPC · JPL
360019	2013 AE_{14}	—	January 5, 2003	Socorro	LINEAR	·	2.3 km	MPC · JPL
360020	2013 AW_{15}	—	February 2, 2006	Kitt Peak	Spacewatch	·	2.5 km	MPC · JPL
360021	2013 AY_{16}	—	July 13, 2001	Palomar	NEAT	·	2.4 km	MPC · JPL
360022	2013 AE_{19}	—	January 30, 2003	Kitt Peak	Spacewatch	·	660 m	MPC · JPL
360023	2013 AQ_{20}	—	February 20, 2002	Kitt Peak	Spacewatch	·	2.9 km	MPC · JPL
360024	2013 AS_{20}	—	December 20, 2001	Palomar	NEAT	·	1.5 km	MPC · JPL
360025	2013 AA_{21}	—	February 10, 2002	Kitt Peak	Spacewatch	EOS	2.6 km	MPC · JPL
360026	2013 AN_{22}	—	April 26, 2003	Kitt Peak	Spacewatch	·	610 m	MPC · JPL
360027	2013 AF_{27}	—	January 30, 2008	Mount Lemmon	Mount Lemmon Survey	·	1.8 km	MPC · JPL
360028	2013 AE_{28}	—	October 28, 2005	Kitt Peak	Spacewatch	·	670 m	MPC · JPL
360029	2013 AF_{29}	—	December 27, 2005	Kitt Peak	Spacewatch	·	710 m	MPC · JPL
360030	2013 AT_{29}	—	November 1, 2005	Mount Lemmon	Mount Lemmon Survey	·	1.6 km	MPC · JPL
360031	2013 AA_{30}	—	January 26, 2010	WISE	WISE	L4 · ERY	10 km	MPC · JPL
360032	2013 AX_{32}	—	October 10, 2008	Mount Lemmon	Mount Lemmon Survey	(1338) (FLO)	680 m	MPC · JPL
360033	2013 AZ_{32}	—	March 13, 2002	Socorro	LINEAR	·	1.4 km	MPC · JPL
360034	2013 AB_{33}	—	February 22, 2006	Anderson Mesa	LONEOS	·	1.0 km	MPC · JPL
360035	2013 AF_{39}	—	September 3, 2008	Kitt Peak	Spacewatch	·	1.6 km	MPC · JPL
360036	2013 AT_{40}	—	May 31, 2006	Mount Lemmon	Mount Lemmon Survey	·	1.9 km	MPC · JPL
360037 Robertson	2013 AO_{41}	Robertson	September 24, 2011	Haleakala	Pan-STARRS 1	·	3.2 km	MPC · JPL
360038	2013 AY_{41}	—	April 16, 2010	WISE	WISE	NAE	3.2 km	MPC · JPL
360039	2013 AU_{44}	—	December 10, 2005	Kitt Peak	Spacewatch	MAS	840 m	MPC · JPL
360040	2013 AZ_{44}	—	April 7, 2003	Kitt Peak	Spacewatch	·	3.6 km	MPC · JPL
360041	2013 AO_{53}	—	October 20, 2012	Mount Lemmon	Mount Lemmon Survey	L4	9.7 km	MPC · JPL
360042	2013 AS_{53}	—	February 2, 2000	Socorro	LINEAR	·	4.3 km	MPC · JPL
360043	2013 AW_{54}	—	January 8, 1999	Kitt Peak	Spacewatch	AST	2.4 km	MPC · JPL
360044	2013 AU_{58}	—	October 12, 1998	Kitt Peak	Spacewatch	·	490 m	MPC · JPL
360045	2013 AC_{59}	—	May 1, 2006	Kitt Peak	Spacewatch	·	1.3 km	MPC · JPL
360046	2013 AG_{59}	—	March 29, 2009	Siding Spring	SSS	·	2.4 km	MPC · JPL
360047	2013 AM_{59}	—	December 26, 2000	Kitt Peak	Spacewatch	L4	10 km	MPC · JPL
360048	2013 AN_{59}	—	February 3, 2008	Kitt Peak	Spacewatch	·	2.9 km	MPC · JPL
360049	2013 AJ_{68}	—	January 24, 1996	Kitt Peak	Spacewatch	·	5.4 km	MPC · JPL
360050	2013 AM_{73}	—	April 10, 2000	Socorro	LINEAR	·	1.8 km	MPC · JPL
360051	2013 AQ_{74}	—	January 22, 2004	Socorro	LINEAR	·	1.8 km	MPC · JPL
360052	2013 AE_{77}	—	December 10, 2005	Catalina	CSS	PHO	3.2 km	MPC · JPL
360053	2013 AT_{79}	—	January 29, 1998	Kitt Peak	Spacewatch	·	1.2 km	MPC · JPL
360054	2013 AX_{79}	—	January 10, 2008	Mount Lemmon	Mount Lemmon Survey	·	2.2 km	MPC · JPL
360055	2013 AR_{88}	—	August 10, 2007	Kitt Peak	Spacewatch	·	1.3 km	MPC · JPL
360056	2013 AU_{91}	—	June 20, 2006	Mount Lemmon	Mount Lemmon Survey	·	2.6 km	MPC · JPL
360057	2013 AK_{92}	—	July 8, 2007	Lulin	LUSS	L4	10 km	MPC · JPL
360058	2013 AL_{92}	—	November 14, 1998	Kitt Peak	Spacewatch	L4	9.2 km	MPC · JPL
360059	2013 AP_{95}	—	March 11, 2008	Catalina	CSS	URS	5.7 km	MPC · JPL
360060	2013 AA_{97}	—	February 4, 1997	Kitt Peak	Spacewatch	·	2.5 km	MPC · JPL
360061	2013 AL_{97}	—	January 27, 2003	Socorro	LINEAR	·	710 m	MPC · JPL
360062	2013 AJ_{101}	—	April 4, 2002	Palomar	NEAT	·	1.2 km	MPC · JPL
360063	2013 AL_{102}	—	March 11, 2000	Socorro	LINEAR	·	760 m	MPC · JPL
360064	2013 AP_{104}	—	April 5, 2002	Palomar	NEAT	L4	9.6 km	MPC · JPL
360065	2013 AA_{105}	—	December 4, 2007	Catalina	CSS	·	1.9 km	MPC · JPL
360066	2013 AZ_{111}	—	February 29, 2000	Socorro	LINEAR	·	2.4 km	MPC · JPL
360067	2013 AU_{115}	—	December 15, 2003	Socorro	LINEAR	JUN	1.1 km	MPC · JPL
360068	2013 AM_{117}	—	November 21, 2006	Mount Lemmon	Mount Lemmon Survey	·	6.0 km	MPC · JPL
360069	2013 AX_{118}	—	November 7, 2007	Mount Lemmon	Mount Lemmon Survey	·	4.3 km	MPC · JPL
360070	2013 AY_{126}	—	October 28, 2010	Mount Lemmon	Mount Lemmon Survey	L4	9.3 km	MPC · JPL
360071	2013 AC_{131}	—	September 4, 2008	Kitt Peak	Spacewatch	L4	8.4 km	MPC · JPL
360072 Alcimedon	2013 AJ_{131}	Alcimedon	September 2, 2008	Zelenchukskaya Stn	Zelenchukskaya Stn	L4 · ERY	10 km	MPC · JPL
360073	2013 AL_{131}	—	December 28, 2000	Kitt Peak	Spacewatch	L4	10 km	MPC · JPL
360074	2013 AZ_{131}	—	February 11, 2002	Socorro	LINEAR	·	2.9 km	MPC · JPL
360075	2013 AD_{132}	—	October 1, 2009	Mount Lemmon	Mount Lemmon Survey	L4	10 km	MPC · JPL
360076	2013 AE_{132}	—	May 30, 2003	Cerro Tololo	Deep Ecliptic Survey	L4	7.9 km	MPC · JPL
360077	2013 AK_{132}	—	November 12, 2010	Mount Lemmon	Mount Lemmon Survey	L4	8.4 km	MPC · JPL
360078	2013 AQ_{133}	—	May 11, 2003	Kitt Peak	Spacewatch	·	7.0 km	MPC · JPL
360079	2013 BM_{1}	—	July 29, 2008	Kitt Peak	Spacewatch	L4 · (222861)	8.9 km	MPC · JPL
360080	2013 BA_{15}	—	May 21, 2006	Kitt Peak	Spacewatch	·	1.4 km	MPC · JPL
360081	2013 BJ_{16}	—	August 19, 2001	Socorro	LINEAR	H	660 m	MPC · JPL
360082	2013 BJ_{19}	—	July 24, 2003	Palomar	NEAT	·	1.5 km	MPC · JPL
360083	2013 BZ_{23}	—	January 14, 1999	Kitt Peak	Spacewatch	·	2.5 km	MPC · JPL
360084	2013 BZ_{25}	—	September 13, 2004	Kitt Peak	Spacewatch	·	4.0 km	MPC · JPL
360085	2013 BJ_{33}	—	April 17, 2005	Kitt Peak	Spacewatch	·	2.3 km	MPC · JPL
360086	2013 BF_{34}	—	April 1, 2003	Apache Point	SDSS	·	3.5 km	MPC · JPL
360087	2013 BY_{40}	—	December 28, 2003	Kitt Peak	Spacewatch	·	2.3 km	MPC · JPL
360088	2013 BB_{47}	—	February 10, 2002	Socorro	LINEAR	L4	8.7 km	MPC · JPL
360089	2013 BV_{54}	—	August 17, 2006	Palomar	NEAT	HNS	1.4 km	MPC · JPL
360090	2013 BZ_{54}	—	July 4, 2005	Mount Lemmon	Mount Lemmon Survey	·	2.2 km	MPC · JPL
360091	2013 BE_{55}	—	February 9, 2002	Kitt Peak	Spacewatch	MAS	880 m	MPC · JPL
360092	2013 BO_{61}	—	February 12, 2002	Kitt Peak	Spacewatch	·	2.4 km	MPC · JPL
360093	2013 BF_{62}	—	September 13, 2007	Mount Lemmon	Mount Lemmon Survey	L4	8.8 km	MPC · JPL
360094	2013 BO_{62}	—	May 10, 2005	Kitt Peak	Spacewatch	·	1.9 km	MPC · JPL
360095	2013 BP_{62}	—	November 20, 2003	Kitt Peak	Deep Ecliptic Survey	·	1.0 km	MPC · JPL
360096	2013 BF_{63}	—	April 7, 2003	Kitt Peak	Spacewatch	·	4.0 km	MPC · JPL
360097	2013 BS_{63}	—	January 21, 2002	Kitt Peak	Spacewatch	·	1.5 km	MPC · JPL
360098	2013 BC_{64}	—	October 9, 2007	Kitt Peak	Spacewatch	·	2.4 km	MPC · JPL
360099	2013 BQ_{64}	—	February 12, 2004	Kitt Peak	Spacewatch	·	2.5 km	MPC · JPL
360100	2013 BC_{65}	—	May 8, 2005	Kitt Peak	Spacewatch	L4	10 km	MPC · JPL

== 360101–360200 ==
back to top

Designation			Discovery			Properties		Ref
Permanent	Provisional	Named after	Date	Site	Discoverer(s)	Category	Diam.	Ref
360101	2013 BN_{79}	—	May 24, 2003	Kitt Peak	Spacewatch	·	1.2 km	MPC · JPL
360102	2013 BQ_{79}	—	January 31, 1995	Kitt Peak	Spacewatch	·	1.0 km	MPC · JPL
360103	2013 CW	—	November 1, 2008	Mount Lemmon	Mount Lemmon Survey	L4	10 km	MPC · JPL
360104	2013 CG_{9}	—	April 8, 2010	Mount Lemmon	Mount Lemmon Survey	·	1.5 km	MPC · JPL
360105	2013 CG_{11}	—	April 26, 2010	Mount Lemmon	Mount Lemmon Survey	·	1.5 km	MPC · JPL
360106	2013 CM_{13}	—	May 25, 2006	Mauna Kea	P. A. Wiegert	·	1.0 km	MPC · JPL
360107	2013 CS_{14}	—	January 16, 2010	WISE	WISE	L4	10 km	MPC · JPL
360108	2013 CY_{14}	—	November 5, 2007	Mount Lemmon	Mount Lemmon Survey	AGN	1.3 km	MPC · JPL
360109	2013 CD_{15}	—	March 25, 2009	Mount Lemmon	Mount Lemmon Survey	·	3.2 km	MPC · JPL
360110	2013 CZ_{15}	—	February 7, 2002	Palomar	NEAT	THM	2.3 km	MPC · JPL
360111	2013 CA_{16}	—	March 18, 2004	Kitt Peak	Spacewatch	AGN	1.1 km	MPC · JPL
360112	2013 CG_{16}	—	August 1, 2005	Siding Spring	SSS	·	2.4 km	MPC · JPL
360113	2013 CM_{16}	—	February 12, 2002	Kitt Peak	Spacewatch	·	1.3 km	MPC · JPL
360114	2013 CY_{16}	—	September 21, 2001	Kitt Peak	Spacewatch	·	2.2 km	MPC · JPL
360115	2013 CK_{17}	—	November 21, 2005	Kitt Peak	Spacewatch	·	570 m	MPC · JPL
360116	2013 CS_{17}	—	April 11, 2003	Kitt Peak	Spacewatch	·	910 m	MPC · JPL
360117	2013 CG_{20}	—	November 11, 2006	Kitt Peak	Spacewatch	VER	3.4 km	MPC · JPL
360118	2013 CS_{20}	—	September 20, 2003	Kitt Peak	Spacewatch	·	1.4 km	MPC · JPL
360119	2013 CK_{21}	—	February 7, 2002	Palomar	NEAT	NYS	970 m	MPC · JPL
360120	2013 CQ_{21}	—	September 19, 2006	Kitt Peak	Spacewatch	AGN	1.3 km	MPC · JPL
360121	2013 CE_{25}	—	October 23, 2006	Kitt Peak	Spacewatch	·	2.1 km	MPC · JPL
360122	2013 CH_{27}	—	April 7, 2003	Kitt Peak	Spacewatch	·	3.0 km	MPC · JPL
360123	2013 CT_{27}	—	September 26, 2006	Kitt Peak	Spacewatch	HOF	2.6 km	MPC · JPL
360124	2013 CW_{27}	—	September 11, 2004	Kitt Peak	Spacewatch	·	970 m	MPC · JPL
360125	2013 CA_{30}	—	March 21, 1998	Kitt Peak	Spacewatch	·	2.0 km	MPC · JPL
360126	2013 CZ_{31}	—	April 30, 2006	Kitt Peak	Spacewatch	PHO	1.1 km	MPC · JPL
360127	2013 CN_{32}	—	March 27, 2004	Anderson Mesa	LONEOS	DOR	2.8 km	MPC · JPL
360128	2013 CK_{33}	—	April 1, 2003	Apache Point	SDSS	·	3.0 km	MPC · JPL
360129	2013 CX_{34}	—	June 20, 2010	Mount Lemmon	Mount Lemmon Survey	EUN	1.5 km	MPC · JPL
360130	2013 CA_{35}	—	September 29, 1995	Kitt Peak	Spacewatch	·	750 m	MPC · JPL
360131	2013 CK_{35}	—	February 16, 1996	Caussols	E. W. Elst	·	2.9 km	MPC · JPL
360132	2013 CL_{35}	—	February 13, 2002	Kitt Peak	Spacewatch	·	2.9 km	MPC · JPL
360133	2013 CA_{37}	—	August 29, 2000	Socorro	LINEAR	H	710 m	MPC · JPL
360134	2013 CG_{37}	—	February 2, 2000	Socorro	LINEAR	·	2.5 km	MPC · JPL
360135	2013 CL_{37}	—	March 16, 2005	Catalina	CSS	·	1.6 km	MPC · JPL
360136	2013 CY_{37}	—	April 5, 2005	Catalina	CSS	·	1.7 km	MPC · JPL
360137	2013 CO_{38}	—	October 7, 2002	Kitt Peak	Spacewatch	EUN	1.4 km	MPC · JPL
360138	2013 CP_{38}	—	October 10, 1993	La Silla	E. W. Elst	ERI	1.6 km	MPC · JPL
360139	2013 CV_{39}	—	February 10, 2002	Socorro	LINEAR	·	4.0 km	MPC · JPL
360140	2013 CS_{43}	—	December 5, 2007	Kitt Peak	Spacewatch	·	2.3 km	MPC · JPL
360141	2013 CY_{45}	—	October 1, 2005	Kitt Peak	Spacewatch	·	3.3 km	MPC · JPL
360142	2013 CD_{46}	—	October 25, 2000	Socorro	LINEAR	NYS	1.3 km	MPC · JPL
360143	2013 CS_{48}	—	October 26, 2009	Kitt Peak	Spacewatch	L4	8.0 km	MPC · JPL
360144	2013 CY_{50}	—	January 31, 2004	Kitt Peak	Spacewatch	·	2.0 km	MPC · JPL
360145	2013 CU_{52}	—	November 22, 1995	Kitt Peak	Spacewatch	·	1.3 km	MPC · JPL
360146	2013 CQ_{53}	—	February 11, 2004	Kitt Peak	Spacewatch	WIT	900 m	MPC · JPL
360147	2013 CU_{54}	—	December 15, 2001	Socorro	LINEAR	·	2.3 km	MPC · JPL
360148	2013 CZ_{54}	—	March 10, 2006	Siding Spring	SSS	PHO	1.5 km	MPC · JPL
360149	2013 CH_{58}	—	September 4, 2008	Kitt Peak	Spacewatch	·	970 m	MPC · JPL
360150	2013 CM_{58}	—	January 9, 2002	Kitt Peak	Spacewatch	NYS	1.2 km	MPC · JPL
360151	2013 CX_{59}	—	September 17, 2004	Kitt Peak	Spacewatch	CYB	3.8 km	MPC · JPL
360152	2013 CO_{62}	—	October 22, 2008	Kitt Peak	Spacewatch	·	850 m	MPC · JPL
360153	2013 CM_{65}	—	August 21, 2006	Kitt Peak	Spacewatch	·	2.1 km	MPC · JPL
360154	2013 CR_{65}	—	February 4, 2000	Kitt Peak	Spacewatch	CYB	4.3 km	MPC · JPL
360155	2013 CC_{66}	—	April 5, 2003	Kitt Peak	Spacewatch	·	850 m	MPC · JPL
360156	2013 CF_{66}	—	February 12, 2004	Kitt Peak	Spacewatch	·	2.3 km	MPC · JPL
360157	2013 CO_{66}	—	November 17, 2008	Kitt Peak	Spacewatch	·	1.4 km	MPC · JPL
360158	2013 CQ_{66}	—	May 17, 2010	Kitt Peak	Spacewatch	·	1.5 km	MPC · JPL
360159	2013 CP_{68}	—	October 21, 1995	Kitt Peak	Spacewatch	·	2.2 km	MPC · JPL
360160	2013 CC_{69}	—	September 28, 2008	Mount Lemmon	Mount Lemmon Survey	L4	10 km	MPC · JPL
360161	2013 CK_{69}	—	December 27, 2006	Mount Lemmon	Mount Lemmon Survey	·	3.6 km	MPC · JPL
360162	2013 CJ_{71}	—	November 11, 2009	Catalina	CSS	L4	10 km	MPC · JPL
360163	2013 CC_{72}	—	May 27, 2010	WISE	WISE	·	3.0 km	MPC · JPL
360164	2013 CS_{72}	—	September 12, 2007	Catalina	CSS	EUN	1.2 km	MPC · JPL
360165	2013 CE_{80}	—	December 29, 2005	Kitt Peak	Spacewatch	·	720 m	MPC · JPL
360166	2013 CJ_{80}	—	September 13, 1998	Kitt Peak	Spacewatch	·	1.3 km	MPC · JPL
360167	2013 CC_{83}	—	January 13, 2002	Socorro	LINEAR	·	2.9 km	MPC · JPL
360168	2013 CN_{87}	—	November 9, 1993	Kitt Peak	Spacewatch	AGN	1.1 km	MPC · JPL
360169	2013 CF_{96}	—	March 17, 2004	Kitt Peak	Spacewatch	·	1.8 km	MPC · JPL
360170	2013 CS_{101}	—	January 16, 2008	Mount Lemmon	Mount Lemmon Survey	·	2.2 km	MPC · JPL
360171	2013 CZ_{102}	—	September 22, 2008	Mount Lemmon	Mount Lemmon Survey	L4	10 km	MPC · JPL
360172	2013 CF_{112}	—	May 15, 2005	Palomar	NEAT	·	2.7 km	MPC · JPL
360173	2013 CF_{114}	—	October 23, 2001	Socorro	LINEAR	·	2.3 km	MPC · JPL
360174	2013 CG_{118}	—	April 23, 1995	Kitt Peak	Spacewatch	·	1.6 km	MPC · JPL
360175	2013 CJ_{120}	—	October 7, 2004	Socorro	LINEAR	·	2.2 km	MPC · JPL
360176	2013 CV_{121}	—	April 14, 2002	Kitt Peak	Spacewatch	·	1.3 km	MPC · JPL
360177	2013 CK_{130}	—	August 18, 2006	Kitt Peak	Spacewatch	·	2.5 km	MPC · JPL
360178	2013 CQ_{130}	—	March 27, 2003	Palomar	NEAT	·	750 m	MPC · JPL
360179	2013 CN_{131}	—	October 6, 2004	Kitt Peak	Spacewatch	·	1.2 km	MPC · JPL
360180	2013 CD_{137}	—	September 12, 2007	Mount Lemmon	Mount Lemmon Survey	L4	10 km	MPC · JPL
360181	2013 CR_{137}	—	October 25, 2005	Kitt Peak	Spacewatch	·	3.4 km	MPC · JPL
360182	2013 CC_{176}	—	March 18, 2002	Kitt Peak	Spacewatch	·	1.5 km	MPC · JPL
360183	2013 CS_{176}	—	September 10, 2007	Mount Lemmon	Mount Lemmon Survey	·	950 m	MPC · JPL
360184	2013 CG_{177}	—	January 26, 2006	Catalina	CSS	PHO	1.2 km	MPC · JPL
360185	2013 CP_{177}	—	September 29, 2009	Mount Lemmon	Mount Lemmon Survey	L4	9.5 km	MPC · JPL
360186	2013 CV_{179}	—	November 25, 2005	Mount Lemmon	Mount Lemmon Survey	·	770 m	MPC · JPL
360187	2013 CU_{180}	—	December 28, 2005	Kitt Peak	Spacewatch	·	750 m	MPC · JPL
360188	2013 CZ_{181}	—	August 29, 2005	Kitt Peak	Spacewatch	EOS	2.0 km	MPC · JPL
360189	2013 CY_{191}	—	March 17, 2005	Catalina	CSS	·	2.0 km	MPC · JPL
360190	2013 DN_{9}	—	September 11, 2007	Kitt Peak	Spacewatch	·	1.4 km	MPC · JPL
360191	1988 TA	—	October 5, 1988	Palomar	Phinney, J., J. E. Mueller	APO · PHA · critical	400 m	MPC · JPL
360192	1991 FB	—	March 18, 1991	Siding Spring	R. H. McNaught	AMO	520 m	MPC · JPL
360193	1995 SF_{35}	—	September 22, 1995	Kitt Peak	Spacewatch	·	1.0 km	MPC · JPL
360194	1995 SV_{41}	—	September 25, 1995	Kitt Peak	Spacewatch	·	2.1 km	MPC · JPL
360195	1995 UC_{21}	—	October 19, 1995	Kitt Peak	Spacewatch	BRA	1.5 km	MPC · JPL
360196	1996 ND	—	July 14, 1996	Haleakala	NEAT	JUN	1.4 km	MPC · JPL
360197	1996 TS_{47}	—	October 12, 1996	Kitt Peak	Spacewatch	HOF	2.6 km	MPC · JPL
360198	1997 SO_{24}	—	September 30, 1997	Kitt Peak	Spacewatch	·	1.8 km	MPC · JPL
360199	1997 SQ_{30}	—	September 30, 1997	Kitt Peak	Spacewatch	·	2.1 km	MPC · JPL
360200	1997 UF_{8}	—	October 26, 1997	Goodricke-Pigott	R. A. Tucker	·	3.7 km	MPC · JPL

== 360201–360300 ==
back to top

Designation			Discovery			Properties		Ref
Permanent	Provisional	Named after	Date	Site	Discoverer(s)	Category	Diam.	Ref
360201	1997 WF_{9}	—	November 21, 1997	Kitt Peak	Spacewatch	EUN	1.5 km	MPC · JPL
360202	1997 WK_{27}	—	November 29, 1997	Kitt Peak	Spacewatch	·	850 m	MPC · JPL
360203	1998 DT_{8}	—	February 23, 1998	Kitt Peak	Spacewatch	·	1.2 km	MPC · JPL
360204	1998 SE_{31}	—	September 20, 1998	Kitt Peak	Spacewatch	·	4.9 km	MPC · JPL
360205	1998 SZ_{32}	—	September 23, 1998	Kitt Peak	Spacewatch	EOS	1.8 km	MPC · JPL
360206	1998 SF_{146}	—	September 20, 1998	La Silla	E. W. Elst	·	5.7 km	MPC · JPL
360207	1998 TE_{22}	—	October 13, 1998	Kitt Peak	Spacewatch	·	1.5 km	MPC · JPL
360208	1998 VL_{2}	—	November 10, 1998	Caussols	ODAS	·	1.7 km	MPC · JPL
360209	1998 WJ_{7}	—	November 19, 1998	Kitt Peak	Spacewatch	·	530 m	MPC · JPL
360210	1998 WZ_{29}	—	November 24, 1998	Kitt Peak	Spacewatch	·	2.0 km	MPC · JPL
360211	1999 CS_{45}	—	February 10, 1999	Socorro	LINEAR	·	2.0 km	MPC · JPL
360212	1999 FD_{88}	—	March 21, 1999	Apache Point	SDSS	·	2.1 km	MPC · JPL
360213	1999 PY_{5}	—	August 13, 1999	Kitt Peak	Spacewatch	·	2.7 km	MPC · JPL
360214	1999 PH_{8}	—	August 12, 1999	Kitt Peak	Spacewatch	NYS	1.3 km	MPC · JPL
360215	1999 RJ_{2}	—	September 5, 1999	Kitt Peak	Spacewatch	·	2.3 km	MPC · JPL
360216	1999 RA_{27}	—	September 7, 1999	Socorro	LINEAR	T_{j} (2.94)	4.0 km	MPC · JPL
360217	1999 RA_{30}	—	September 8, 1999	Socorro	LINEAR	PHO	1.2 km	MPC · JPL
360218	1999 RZ_{105}	—	September 8, 1999	Socorro	LINEAR	·	1.2 km	MPC · JPL
360219	1999 SG_{26}	—	September 30, 1999	Kitt Peak	Spacewatch	·	1.5 km	MPC · JPL
360220	1999 TU_{20}	—	October 7, 1999	Goodricke-Pigott	R. A. Tucker	·	1.5 km	MPC · JPL
360221	1999 TX_{34}	—	October 3, 1999	Socorro	LINEAR	·	1.2 km	MPC · JPL
360222	1999 TE_{62}	—	October 7, 1999	Kitt Peak	Spacewatch	·	4.9 km	MPC · JPL
360223	1999 TU_{63}	—	October 7, 1999	Kitt Peak	Spacewatch	·	4.9 km	MPC · JPL
360224	1999 TX_{68}	—	October 9, 1999	Kitt Peak	Spacewatch	·	2.2 km	MPC · JPL
360225	1999 TV_{115}	—	October 4, 1999	Socorro	LINEAR	·	1.7 km	MPC · JPL
360226	1999 TP_{161}	—	October 9, 1999	Socorro	LINEAR	·	1.3 km	MPC · JPL
360227	1999 TW_{259}	—	October 9, 1999	Socorro	LINEAR	·	1.6 km	MPC · JPL
360228	1999 TH_{321}	—	October 12, 1999	Kitt Peak	Spacewatch	·	2.0 km	MPC · JPL
360229	1999 VL_{11}	—	November 6, 1999	Socorro	LINEAR	H	640 m	MPC · JPL
360230	1999 VG_{116}	—	November 4, 1999	Kitt Peak	Spacewatch	·	1.7 km	MPC · JPL
360231	1999 VM_{138}	—	November 9, 1999	Kitt Peak	Spacewatch	·	4.1 km	MPC · JPL
360232	1999 VD_{155}	—	November 13, 1999	Kitt Peak	Spacewatch	HYG	2.4 km	MPC · JPL
360233	1999 VR_{174}	—	November 1, 1999	Kitt Peak	Spacewatch	LIX	3.3 km	MPC · JPL
360234	2000 BF_{41}	—	January 30, 2000	Kitt Peak	Spacewatch	·	1.4 km	MPC · JPL
360235	2000 BV_{42}	—	January 27, 2000	Kitt Peak	Spacewatch	MAR	1.2 km	MPC · JPL
360236	2000 BQ_{44}	—	January 27, 2000	Kitt Peak	Spacewatch	·	1.4 km	MPC · JPL
360237	2000 BS_{48}	—	January 29, 2000	Kitt Peak	Spacewatch	·	1.3 km	MPC · JPL
360238	2000 CC_{120}	—	February 2, 2000	Socorro	LINEAR	·	1.9 km	MPC · JPL
360239	2000 CJ_{125}	—	February 3, 2000	Socorro	LINEAR	BRG	2.1 km	MPC · JPL
360240	2000 DU_{10}	—	February 26, 2000	Kitt Peak	Spacewatch	·	1.4 km	MPC · JPL
360241	2000 ED_{16}	—	March 3, 2000	Kitt Peak	Spacewatch	·	1.2 km	MPC · JPL
360242	2000 EU_{165}	—	February 25, 2000	Kitt Peak	Spacewatch	HNS	1.2 km	MPC · JPL
360243	2000 EG_{196}	—	March 3, 2000	Socorro	LINEAR	·	1.5 km	MPC · JPL
360244	2000 FN_{7}	—	March 29, 2000	Kitt Peak	Spacewatch	·	1.6 km	MPC · JPL
360245	2000 GG_{4}	—	April 3, 2000	Socorro	LINEAR	·	2.1 km	MPC · JPL
360246	2000 GW_{11}	—	April 5, 2000	Socorro	LINEAR	·	2.0 km	MPC · JPL
360247	2000 GH_{14}	—	April 5, 2000	Socorro	LINEAR	·	750 m	MPC · JPL
360248	2000 GN_{23}	—	March 27, 2000	Kitt Peak	Spacewatch	EUN	1.2 km	MPC · JPL
360249	2000 GQ_{127}	—	April 4, 2000	Kitt Peak	Spacewatch	·	1.3 km	MPC · JPL
360250	2000 GH_{186}	—	April 10, 2000	Kitt Peak	M. W. Buie	EUN	1.3 km	MPC · JPL
360251	2000 HL_{20}	—	April 27, 2000	Socorro	LINEAR	H	680 m	MPC · JPL
360252	2000 HV_{53}	—	April 29, 2000	Socorro	LINEAR	slow	2.2 km	MPC · JPL
360253	2000 HH_{102}	—	April 25, 2000	Kitt Peak	Spacewatch	·	1.4 km	MPC · JPL
360254	2000 JU_{3}	—	May 4, 2000	Socorro	LINEAR	H	820 m	MPC · JPL
360255	2000 JF_{6}	—	May 3, 2000	Socorro	LINEAR	·	2.1 km	MPC · JPL
360256	2000 JB_{8}	—	May 5, 2000	Kitt Peak	Spacewatch	·	1.2 km	MPC · JPL
360257	2000 JY_{78}	—	May 4, 2000	Socorro	LINEAR	·	2.5 km	MPC · JPL
360258	2000 JD_{80}	—	May 6, 2000	Kitt Peak	Spacewatch	EUN	1.7 km	MPC · JPL
360259	2000 KX_{10}	—	May 28, 2000	Socorro	LINEAR	EUN	1.7 km	MPC · JPL
360260	2000 KN_{37}	—	May 24, 2000	Kitt Peak	Spacewatch	·	2.1 km	MPC · JPL
360261	2000 OO_{11}	—	July 23, 2000	Socorro	LINEAR	·	2.6 km	MPC · JPL
360262	2000 OX_{60}	—	July 29, 2000	Anderson Mesa	LONEOS	·	2.7 km	MPC · JPL
360263	2000 QJ_{184}	—	August 26, 2000	Socorro	LINEAR	·	830 m	MPC · JPL
360264	2000 QL_{220}	—	August 21, 2000	Anderson Mesa	LONEOS	·	970 m	MPC · JPL
360265	2000 SN_{53}	—	September 24, 2000	Socorro	LINEAR	·	880 m	MPC · JPL
360266	2000 SZ_{84}	—	September 24, 2000	Socorro	LINEAR	V	870 m	MPC · JPL
360267	2000 SH_{116}	—	September 24, 2000	Socorro	LINEAR	·	1.7 km	MPC · JPL
360268	2000 SC_{186}	—	September 21, 2000	Kitt Peak	Spacewatch	DOR	2.8 km	MPC · JPL
360269	2000 SF_{200}	—	September 24, 2000	Socorro	LINEAR	(2076)	1.1 km	MPC · JPL
360270	2000 SL_{218}	—	September 26, 2000	Socorro	LINEAR	·	1.5 km	MPC · JPL
360271	2000 SJ_{239}	—	September 27, 2000	Socorro	LINEAR	(2076)	920 m	MPC · JPL
360272	2000 SE_{254}	—	September 24, 2000	Socorro	LINEAR	·	980 m	MPC · JPL
360273	2000 SU_{260}	—	September 24, 2000	Socorro	LINEAR	·	800 m	MPC · JPL
360274	2000 SZ_{297}	—	September 28, 2000	Socorro	LINEAR	·	1.0 km	MPC · JPL
360275	2000 SU_{300}	—	September 28, 2000	Socorro	LINEAR	·	1.0 km	MPC · JPL
360276	2000 SD_{302}	—	September 28, 2000	Socorro	LINEAR	·	1.3 km	MPC · JPL
360277	2000 SJ_{364}	—	September 20, 2000	Socorro	LINEAR	·	3.0 km	MPC · JPL
360278	2000 TN_{27}	—	October 3, 2000	Socorro	LINEAR	·	1.6 km	MPC · JPL
360279	2000 TJ_{31}	—	October 4, 2000	Kitt Peak	Spacewatch	·	890 m	MPC · JPL
360280	2000 UH_{16}	—	October 29, 2000	Socorro	LINEAR	·	1.7 km	MPC · JPL
360281	2000 UN_{76}	—	October 30, 2000	Socorro	LINEAR	PHO	1.4 km	MPC · JPL
360282	2000 VQ_{22}	—	November 1, 2000	Socorro	LINEAR	·	1.1 km	MPC · JPL
360283	2000 WG_{25}	—	November 21, 2000	Socorro	LINEAR	V	920 m	MPC · JPL
360284	2000 WU_{29}	—	November 25, 2000	Kitt Peak	Spacewatch	H	580 m	MPC · JPL
360285	2000 WD_{110}	—	November 20, 2000	Socorro	LINEAR	·	1.8 km	MPC · JPL
360286	2000 WT_{117}	—	November 20, 2000	Socorro	LINEAR	·	1.9 km	MPC · JPL
360287	2000 WL_{184}	—	November 30, 2000	Anderson Mesa	LONEOS	·	990 m	MPC · JPL
360288	2001 BM_{3}	—	January 17, 2001	Socorro	LINEAR	T_{j} (2.99) · EUP	7.0 km	MPC · JPL
360289	2001 BH_{39}	—	January 19, 2001	Kitt Peak	Spacewatch	·	4.1 km	MPC · JPL
360290	2001 DC_{49}	—	February 16, 2001	Socorro	LINEAR	·	4.6 km	MPC · JPL
360291	2001 DQ_{97}	—	February 17, 2001	Socorro	LINEAR	PHO	1.6 km	MPC · JPL
360292	2001 LP_{1}	—	June 14, 2001	Palomar	NEAT	·	2.3 km	MPC · JPL
360293	2001 OU_{9}	—	July 18, 2001	Palomar	NEAT	·	1.6 km	MPC · JPL
360294	2001 OO_{26}	—	July 18, 2001	Palomar	NEAT	·	2.0 km	MPC · JPL
360295	2001 OO_{85}	—	June 29, 2001	Anderson Mesa	LONEOS	·	2.3 km	MPC · JPL
360296	2001 PQ_{31}	—	July 31, 2001	Palomar	NEAT	MAR	1.5 km	MPC · JPL
360297	2001 QG_{19}	—	August 16, 2001	Socorro	LINEAR	JUN	1.6 km	MPC · JPL
360298	2001 QP_{184}	—	July 20, 2001	Anderson Mesa	LONEOS	EUN	1.8 km	MPC · JPL
360299	2001 QU_{208}	—	August 23, 2001	Anderson Mesa	LONEOS	·	2.5 km	MPC · JPL
360300	2001 QD_{211}	—	August 24, 2001	Kitt Peak	Spacewatch	·	2.1 km	MPC · JPL

== 360301–360400 ==
back to top

Designation			Discovery			Properties		Ref
Permanent	Provisional	Named after	Date	Site	Discoverer(s)	Category	Diam.	Ref
360301	2001 QG_{229}	—	May 29, 2001	Kitt Peak	Spacewatch	·	1.6 km	MPC · JPL
360302	2001 QE_{259}	—	August 25, 2001	Socorro	LINEAR	·	2.1 km	MPC · JPL
360303	2001 RK_{7}	—	September 7, 2001	Socorro	LINEAR	·	2.4 km	MPC · JPL
360304	2001 RO_{34}	—	September 8, 2001	Socorro	LINEAR	·	2.3 km	MPC · JPL
360305	2001 RO_{59}	—	September 12, 2001	Socorro	LINEAR	·	770 m	MPC · JPL
360306	2001 RD_{74}	—	September 10, 2001	Socorro	LINEAR	·	2.4 km	MPC · JPL
360307	2001 SD_{3}	—	September 17, 2001	Desert Eagle	W. K. Y. Yeung	·	2.2 km	MPC · JPL
360308	2001 SS_{10}	—	September 16, 2001	Socorro	LINEAR	·	1.6 km	MPC · JPL
360309	2001 SM_{33}	—	September 16, 2001	Socorro	LINEAR	·	1.7 km	MPC · JPL
360310	2001 SA_{34}	—	September 16, 2001	Socorro	LINEAR	·	2.0 km	MPC · JPL
360311	2001 SF_{39}	—	September 16, 2001	Socorro	LINEAR	·	1.2 km	MPC · JPL
360312	2001 SF_{83}	—	September 20, 2001	Socorro	LINEAR	·	1.9 km	MPC · JPL
360313	2001 SZ_{102}	—	September 20, 2001	Socorro	LINEAR	·	780 m	MPC · JPL
360314	2001 SX_{126}	—	September 16, 2001	Socorro	LINEAR	·	1.6 km	MPC · JPL
360315	2001 SO_{141}	—	September 16, 2001	Socorro	LINEAR	(5)	1.3 km	MPC · JPL
360316	2001 SX_{161}	—	September 17, 2001	Socorro	LINEAR	·	740 m	MPC · JPL
360317	2001 SU_{177}	—	September 16, 2001	Socorro	LINEAR	·	3.3 km	MPC · JPL
360318	2001 SA_{214}	—	September 19, 2001	Socorro	LINEAR	·	1.9 km	MPC · JPL
360319	2001 SA_{225}	—	September 19, 2001	Socorro	LINEAR	·	1.7 km	MPC · JPL
360320	2001 SY_{225}	—	September 19, 2001	Socorro	LINEAR	·	690 m	MPC · JPL
360321	2001 SU_{284}	—	September 22, 2001	Kitt Peak	Spacewatch	·	1.5 km	MPC · JPL
360322	2001 SU_{322}	—	September 25, 2001	Socorro	LINEAR	EUN	1.3 km	MPC · JPL
360323	2001 TC_{7}	—	October 10, 2001	Palomar	NEAT	·	1.3 km	MPC · JPL
360324	2001 TF_{13}	—	October 13, 2001	Socorro	LINEAR	H	660 m	MPC · JPL
360325	2001 TF_{69}	—	October 13, 2001	Socorro	LINEAR	·	600 m	MPC · JPL
360326	2001 TE_{100}	—	September 20, 2001	Socorro	LINEAR	·	900 m	MPC · JPL
360327	2001 TZ_{114}	—	October 14, 2001	Socorro	LINEAR	·	2.3 km	MPC · JPL
360328	2001 TR_{123}	—	October 12, 2001	Haleakala	NEAT	JUN	1.7 km	MPC · JPL
360329	2001 TO_{175}	—	October 14, 2001	Socorro	LINEAR	·	1.7 km	MPC · JPL
360330	2001 TE_{189}	—	October 14, 2001	Socorro	LINEAR	·	2.8 km	MPC · JPL
360331	2001 TU_{192}	—	October 14, 2001	Socorro	LINEAR	JUN	1.3 km	MPC · JPL
360332	2001 TE_{194}	—	October 15, 2001	Socorro	LINEAR	·	900 m	MPC · JPL
360333	2001 TO_{196}	—	October 14, 2001	Haleakala	NEAT	H	690 m	MPC · JPL
360334	2001 TR_{223}	—	October 14, 2001	Socorro	LINEAR	·	1.9 km	MPC · JPL
360335	2001 TB_{260}	—	October 14, 2001	Apache Point	SDSS	·	870 m	MPC · JPL
360336	2001 TE_{262}	—	August 21, 2004	Siding Spring	SSS	·	840 m	MPC · JPL
360337	2001 UR_{1}	—	October 17, 2001	Socorro	LINEAR	·	3.2 km	MPC · JPL
360338	2001 UO_{11}	—	October 23, 2001	Socorro	LINEAR	·	2.9 km	MPC · JPL
360339	2001 UY_{13}	—	October 24, 2001	Desert Eagle	W. K. Y. Yeung	·	930 m	MPC · JPL
360340	2001 UU_{15}	—	October 25, 2001	Desert Eagle	W. K. Y. Yeung	·	2.6 km	MPC · JPL
360341	2001 UK_{28}	—	October 16, 2001	Socorro	LINEAR	EUN	1.5 km	MPC · JPL
360342	2001 UL_{58}	—	October 17, 2001	Socorro	LINEAR	·	650 m	MPC · JPL
360343	2001 UC_{67}	—	October 20, 2001	Socorro	LINEAR	·	1.1 km	MPC · JPL
360344	2001 UC_{102}	—	October 20, 2001	Socorro	LINEAR	·	660 m	MPC · JPL
360345	2001 UR_{120}	—	October 22, 2001	Socorro	LINEAR	·	2.5 km	MPC · JPL
360346	2001 UC_{143}	—	October 23, 2001	Socorro	LINEAR	·	2.3 km	MPC · JPL
360347	2001 UN_{148}	—	October 23, 2001	Socorro	LINEAR	AGN	1.4 km	MPC · JPL
360348	2001 VT_{87}	—	September 18, 2001	Anderson Mesa	LONEOS	·	2.8 km	MPC · JPL
360349	2001 VD_{129}	—	November 11, 2001	Apache Point	SDSS	·	2.2 km	MPC · JPL
360350	2001 VO_{133}	—	November 11, 2001	Apache Point	SDSS	·	2.2 km	MPC · JPL
360351	2001 WL_{23}	—	November 16, 2001	Kitt Peak	Spacewatch	BRA	1.2 km	MPC · JPL
360352	2001 WY_{61}	—	November 19, 2001	Socorro	LINEAR	·	2.6 km	MPC · JPL
360353	2001 XN_{134}	—	December 14, 2001	Socorro	LINEAR	GEF	1.4 km	MPC · JPL
360354	2001 XW_{223}	—	December 15, 2001	Socorro	LINEAR	·	2.4 km	MPC · JPL
360355	2001 XH_{229}	—	December 15, 2001	Socorro	LINEAR	·	580 m	MPC · JPL
360356	2001 XV_{229}	—	November 20, 2001	Socorro	LINEAR	·	770 m	MPC · JPL
360357	2001 XE_{232}	—	December 15, 2001	Socorro	LINEAR	·	2.6 km	MPC · JPL
360358	2001 YK_{29}	—	December 18, 2001	Socorro	LINEAR	·	650 m	MPC · JPL
360359	2001 YE_{91}	—	December 17, 2001	Palomar	NEAT	·	1.1 km	MPC · JPL
360360	2001 YG_{94}	—	December 19, 2001	Kitt Peak	Spacewatch	·	2.7 km	MPC · JPL
360361	2002 AQ_{4}	—	January 8, 2002	Haleakala	NEAT	·	1.3 km	MPC · JPL
360362	2002 AQ_{18}	—	January 13, 2002	Kitt Peak	Spacewatch	H	680 m	MPC · JPL
360363	2002 AP_{21}	—	January 9, 2002	Socorro	LINEAR	H	640 m	MPC · JPL
360364	2002 AE_{69}	—	January 13, 2002	Kitt Peak	Spacewatch	·	960 m	MPC · JPL
360365	2002 AT_{97}	—	January 8, 2002	Socorro	LINEAR	·	970 m	MPC · JPL
360366	2002 AA_{107}	—	January 9, 2002	Socorro	LINEAR	·	710 m	MPC · JPL
360367	2002 AY_{114}	—	January 9, 2002	Socorro	LINEAR	·	960 m	MPC · JPL
360368	2002 AJ_{131}	—	January 13, 2002	Socorro	LINEAR	H	640 m	MPC · JPL
360369	2002 AT_{137}	—	January 9, 2002	Socorro	LINEAR	·	2.2 km	MPC · JPL
360370	2002 AX_{157}	—	January 13, 2002	Socorro	LINEAR	·	3.9 km	MPC · JPL
360371	2002 AS_{200}	—	January 9, 2002	Socorro	LINEAR	·	910 m	MPC · JPL
360372	2002 AH_{202}	—	January 12, 2002	Socorro	LINEAR	H	670 m	MPC · JPL
360373	2002 AQ_{202}	—	January 13, 2002	Socorro	LINEAR	·	1.6 km	MPC · JPL
360374	2002 AW_{202}	—	January 13, 2002	Socorro	LINEAR	·	970 m	MPC · JPL
360375	2002 CV_{23}	—	February 6, 2002	Palomar	NEAT	·	1.6 km	MPC · JPL
360376	2002 CE_{51}	—	February 12, 2002	Desert Eagle	W. K. Y. Yeung	MAS	710 m	MPC · JPL
360377	2002 CK_{87}	—	February 7, 2002	Socorro	LINEAR	·	1.3 km	MPC · JPL
360378	2002 CU_{115}	—	February 13, 2002	Socorro	LINEAR	·	4.0 km	MPC · JPL
360379	2002 CF_{131}	—	February 7, 2002	Socorro	LINEAR	·	1.2 km	MPC · JPL
360380	2002 CQ_{210}	—	February 10, 2002	Socorro	LINEAR	·	2.0 km	MPC · JPL
360381	2002 CC_{213}	—	February 10, 2002	Socorro	LINEAR	·	970 m	MPC · JPL
360382	2002 CB_{262}	—	February 9, 2002	Kitt Peak	Spacewatch	·	1.7 km	MPC · JPL
360383	2002 CO_{266}	—	February 7, 2002	Palomar	NEAT	·	990 m	MPC · JPL
360384	2002 CW_{267}	—	February 7, 2002	Palomar	NEAT	·	850 m	MPC · JPL
360385	2002 CN_{280}	—	February 7, 2002	Haleakala	NEAT	·	2.1 km	MPC · JPL
360386	2002 CG_{304}	—	February 14, 2002	Kitt Peak	Spacewatch	EOS	2.2 km	MPC · JPL
360387	2002 CX_{309}	—	February 6, 2002	Palomar	NEAT	·	1.1 km	MPC · JPL
360388	2002 CY_{311}	—	February 12, 2002	Socorro	LINEAR	·	1.3 km	MPC · JPL
360389	2002 CK_{314}	—	February 11, 2002	Kitt Peak	Spacewatch	·	770 m	MPC · JPL
360390	2002 CW_{317}	—	July 26, 2008	Siding Spring	SSS	L4	10 km	MPC · JPL
360391	2002 DW_{7}	—	February 19, 2002	Socorro	LINEAR	PHO	1.0 km	MPC · JPL
360392	2002 EE_{3}	—	March 10, 2002	Haleakala	NEAT	H	610 m	MPC · JPL
360393	2002 EE_{5}	—	March 10, 2002	Cima Ekar	ADAS	PHO	1.4 km	MPC · JPL
360394	2002 EH_{38}	—	March 10, 2002	Kitt Peak	Spacewatch	·	2.2 km	MPC · JPL
360395	2002 EM_{117}	—	March 9, 2002	Kitt Peak	Spacewatch	NYS	770 m	MPC · JPL
360396	2002 EW_{136}	—	March 12, 2002	Palomar	NEAT	·	1.7 km	MPC · JPL
360397	2002 EG_{155}	—	March 5, 2002	Anderson Mesa	LONEOS	·	1.1 km	MPC · JPL
360398	2002 EH_{156}	—	March 10, 2002	Cima Ekar	ADAS	·	3.2 km	MPC · JPL
360399	2002 EX_{156}	—	March 10, 2002	Cima Ekar	ADAS	·	800 m	MPC · JPL
360400	2002 EH_{158}	—	February 13, 2002	Kitt Peak	Spacewatch	THM	2.1 km	MPC · JPL

== 360401–360500 ==
back to top

Designation			Discovery			Properties		Ref
Permanent	Provisional	Named after	Date	Site	Discoverer(s)	Category	Diam.	Ref
360401	2002 FM_{5}	—	March 16, 2002	Eskridge	G. Hug	ERI	1.8 km	MPC · JPL
360402	2002 FK_{21}	—	March 19, 2002	Anderson Mesa	LONEOS	EOS	2.3 km	MPC · JPL
360403	2002 FF_{40}	—	March 23, 2002	Palomar	White, M., M. Collins	·	1.2 km	MPC · JPL
360404	2002 GF_{6}	—	April 13, 2002	Palomar	NEAT	·	3.4 km	MPC · JPL
360405	2002 GP_{27}	—	April 6, 2002	Cerro Tololo	M. W. Buie	MAS	560 m	MPC · JPL
360406	2002 GS_{33}	—	March 11, 2002	Palomar	NEAT	·	1.2 km	MPC · JPL
360407	2002 GS_{42}	—	April 4, 2002	Palomar	NEAT	·	1.3 km	MPC · JPL
360408	2002 GR_{58}	—	April 8, 2002	Palomar	NEAT	·	1.3 km	MPC · JPL
360409	2002 GJ_{77}	—	April 9, 2002	Anderson Mesa	LONEOS	·	1.4 km	MPC · JPL
360410	2002 GY_{80}	—	April 10, 2002	Socorro	LINEAR	·	2.9 km	MPC · JPL
360411	2002 GV_{81}	—	April 10, 2002	Socorro	LINEAR	·	3.3 km	MPC · JPL
360412	2002 GU_{84}	—	April 10, 2002	Socorro	LINEAR	·	1.7 km	MPC · JPL
360413	2002 GE_{85}	—	April 10, 2002	Socorro	LINEAR	·	1.5 km	MPC · JPL
360414	2002 GR_{103}	—	April 10, 2002	Socorro	LINEAR	·	1.7 km	MPC · JPL
360415	2002 GG_{106}	—	April 11, 2002	Anderson Mesa	LONEOS	·	5.7 km	MPC · JPL
360416	2002 GA_{115}	—	April 11, 2002	Socorro	LINEAR	·	2.2 km	MPC · JPL
360417	2002 GN_{115}	—	April 11, 2002	Socorro	LINEAR	·	1.5 km	MPC · JPL
360418	2002 GR_{125}	—	April 12, 2002	Socorro	LINEAR	H	590 m	MPC · JPL
360419	2002 GX_{128}	—	April 4, 2002	Palomar	NEAT	·	3.7 km	MPC · JPL
360420	2002 GE_{147}	—	April 13, 2002	Palomar	NEAT	·	1.3 km	MPC · JPL
360421	2002 GO_{158}	—	April 13, 2002	Palomar	NEAT	·	4.0 km	MPC · JPL
360422	2002 GF_{174}	—	April 10, 2002	Socorro	LINEAR	TIR	4.3 km	MPC · JPL
360423	2002 GO_{179}	—	April 10, 2002	Palomar	NEAT	·	3.2 km	MPC · JPL
360424	2002 GS_{179}	—	April 11, 2002	Palomar	NEAT	PHO	900 m	MPC · JPL
360425	2002 GF_{181}	—	April 13, 2002	Palomar	NEAT	·	1.5 km	MPC · JPL
360426	2002 GD_{182}	—	April 8, 2002	Palomar	NEAT	TIR	2.7 km	MPC · JPL
360427	2002 GV_{185}	—	April 9, 2002	Palomar	NEAT	·	1.3 km	MPC · JPL
360428	2002 HU_{12}	—	April 22, 2002	Socorro	LINEAR	H	820 m	MPC · JPL
360429	2002 HC_{14}	—	April 30, 2002	Palomar	NEAT	·	1.5 km	MPC · JPL
360430	2002 HK_{18}	—	April 22, 2002	Palomar	NEAT	·	3.7 km	MPC · JPL
360431	2002 JX_{6}	—	May 1, 2002	Palomar	NEAT	T_{j} (2.96)	4.0 km	MPC · JPL
360432	2002 JJ_{9}	—	May 7, 2002	Kitt Peak	Spacewatch	·	1.2 km	MPC · JPL
360433	2002 JR_{9}	—	May 7, 2002	Socorro	LINEAR	APO +1km	980 m	MPC · JPL
360434	2002 JH_{45}	—	May 9, 2002	Socorro	LINEAR	·	1.5 km	MPC · JPL
360435	2002 JG_{56}	—	May 9, 2002	Socorro	LINEAR	H	830 m	MPC · JPL
360436	2002 JE_{70}	—	May 7, 2002	Socorro	LINEAR	·	1.3 km	MPC · JPL
360437	2002 JU_{72}	—	May 8, 2002	Socorro	LINEAR	EOS	3.3 km	MPC · JPL
360438	2002 JJ_{88}	—	May 11, 2002	Socorro	LINEAR	H	620 m	MPC · JPL
360439	2002 JP_{121}	—	May 5, 2002	Palomar	NEAT	PHO	1.5 km	MPC · JPL
360440	2002 JY_{130}	—	April 10, 2002	Socorro	LINEAR	THB	4.4 km	MPC · JPL
360441	2002 JU_{145}	—	May 14, 2002	Palomar	NEAT	·	3.8 km	MPC · JPL
360442	2002 KR_{8}	—	May 30, 2002	Palomar	NEAT	·	5.1 km	MPC · JPL
360443	2002 LR_{29}	—	June 9, 2002	Haleakala	NEAT	·	1.6 km	MPC · JPL
360444	2002 LX_{63}	—	May 26, 2010	WISE	WISE	·	2.0 km	MPC · JPL
360445	2002 MR_{6}	—	March 12, 2007	Catalina	CSS	·	3.4 km	MPC · JPL
360446	2002 NM_{12}	—	July 4, 2002	Palomar	NEAT	·	1.6 km	MPC · JPL
360447	2002 NK_{65}	—	July 14, 2002	Palomar	NEAT	MAS	850 m	MPC · JPL
360448	2002 ND_{68}	—	January 8, 2000	Socorro	LINEAR	·	2.5 km	MPC · JPL
360449	2002 OR_{24}	—	July 29, 2002	Palomar	S. F. Hönig	·	1.4 km	MPC · JPL
360450	2002 PP_{62}	—	August 8, 2002	Palomar	NEAT	·	1.4 km	MPC · JPL
360451	2002 PL_{185}	—	August 8, 2002	Palomar	NEAT	·	950 m	MPC · JPL
360452	2002 QC_{15}	—	August 4, 2002	Palomar	NEAT	·	2.0 km	MPC · JPL
360453	2002 QC_{49}	—	August 29, 2002	Palomar	R. Matson	·	920 m	MPC · JPL
360454	2002 QM_{55}	—	August 29, 2002	Palomar	S. F. Hönig	·	1.3 km	MPC · JPL
360455	2002 QQ_{63}	—	August 30, 2002	Palomar	NEAT	·	2.0 km	MPC · JPL
360456	2002 QV_{79}	—	August 16, 2002	Palomar	NEAT	(5)	1.3 km	MPC · JPL
360457	2002 QU_{145}	—	March 13, 1996	Kitt Peak	Spacewatch	·	1.5 km	MPC · JPL
360458	2002 QQ_{152}	—	July 19, 2010	Siding Spring	SSS	·	1.3 km	MPC · JPL
360459	2002 QH_{153}	—	October 16, 2003	Kitt Peak	Spacewatch	CYB	4.5 km	MPC · JPL
360460	2002 QT_{153}	—	May 26, 2006	Mount Lemmon	Mount Lemmon Survey	·	1.8 km	MPC · JPL
360461	2002 RL	—	September 2, 2002	Ondřejov	P. Pravec, P. Kušnirák	·	1.6 km	MPC · JPL
360462	2002 RT_{139}	—	September 10, 2002	Palomar	NEAT	·	1.6 km	MPC · JPL
360463	2002 RO_{199}	—	September 13, 2002	Palomar	NEAT	·	1.3 km	MPC · JPL
360464	2002 RH_{239}	—	September 14, 2002	Palomar	NEAT	·	1.6 km	MPC · JPL
360465	2002 RS_{243}	—	September 14, 2002	Palomar	NEAT	EUN	1.5 km	MPC · JPL
360466	2002 RW_{244}	—	September 15, 2002	Palomar	NEAT	·	1.6 km	MPC · JPL
360467	2002 RT_{265}	—	September 11, 2002	Haleakala	NEAT	·	960 m	MPC · JPL
360468	2002 ST_{28}	—	September 28, 2002	Palomar	NEAT	·	1.7 km	MPC · JPL
360469	2002 SP_{40}	—	September 30, 2002	Haleakala	NEAT	·	1.7 km	MPC · JPL
360470	2002 TL_{22}	—	October 2, 2002	Socorro	LINEAR	·	1.4 km	MPC · JPL
360471	2002 TO_{35}	—	October 2, 2002	Socorro	LINEAR	·	1.8 km	MPC · JPL
360472	2002 TG_{38}	—	October 2, 2002	Socorro	LINEAR	·	2.3 km	MPC · JPL
360473	2002 TU_{82}	—	October 2, 2002	Socorro	LINEAR	·	1.9 km	MPC · JPL
360474	2002 TA_{100}	—	October 4, 2002	Anderson Mesa	LONEOS	·	1.9 km	MPC · JPL
360475	2002 TM_{222}	—	October 7, 2002	Socorro	LINEAR	·	2.5 km	MPC · JPL
360476	2002 TB_{225}	—	October 8, 2002	Anderson Mesa	LONEOS	(5)	1.3 km	MPC · JPL
360477	2002 TG_{245}	—	October 7, 2002	Haleakala	NEAT	MAR	1.5 km	MPC · JPL
360478	2002 TV_{253}	—	October 9, 2002	Kitt Peak	Spacewatch	fast	1.3 km	MPC · JPL
360479	2002 TJ_{271}	—	October 9, 2002	Socorro	LINEAR	·	1.8 km	MPC · JPL
360480	2002 TE_{296}	—	October 11, 2002	Socorro	LINEAR	·	1.6 km	MPC · JPL
360481	2002 TS_{369}	—	October 10, 2002	Apache Point	SDSS	ADE	2.3 km	MPC · JPL
360482	2002 UK_{8}	—	October 10, 2002	Palomar	NEAT	·	1.8 km	MPC · JPL
360483	2002 UE_{36}	—	October 31, 2002	Anderson Mesa	LONEOS	·	1.9 km	MPC · JPL
360484	2002 UR_{50}	—	October 29, 2002	Apache Point	SDSS	PHO	1.3 km	MPC · JPL
360485	2002 UE_{65}	—	October 30, 2002	Apache Point	SDSS	KON	3.1 km	MPC · JPL
360486	2002 UB_{73}	—	October 16, 2002	Palomar	NEAT	·	1.5 km	MPC · JPL
360487	2002 VK_{1}	—	November 2, 2002	La Palma	La Palma	·	1.3 km	MPC · JPL
360488	2002 VM_{53}	—	November 6, 2002	Socorro	LINEAR	·	2.0 km	MPC · JPL
360489	2002 VB_{74}	—	November 7, 2002	Socorro	LINEAR	EUN	1.4 km	MPC · JPL
360490	2002 VY_{75}	—	November 7, 2002	Socorro	LINEAR	·	1.9 km	MPC · JPL
360491	2002 VB_{92}	—	November 13, 2002	Palomar	NEAT	·	1.8 km	MPC · JPL
360492	2002 VF_{102}	—	November 11, 2002	Kvistaberg	Uppsala-DLR Asteroid Survey	·	2.0 km	MPC · JPL
360493	2002 VO_{107}	—	November 12, 2002	Socorro	LINEAR	·	2.3 km	MPC · JPL
360494	2002 VX_{118}	—	November 12, 2002	Socorro	LINEAR	·	3.0 km	MPC · JPL
360495	2002 VQ_{142}	—	November 5, 2002	Palomar	NEAT	EUN	1.5 km	MPC · JPL
360496	2002 XO_{6}	—	December 1, 2002	Haleakala	NEAT	HNS	1.7 km	MPC · JPL
360497	2002 XQ_{10}	—	December 3, 2002	Palomar	NEAT	·	1.8 km	MPC · JPL
360498	2002 XO_{19}	—	December 2, 2002	Socorro	LINEAR	·	3.3 km	MPC · JPL
360499	2002 XK_{53}	—	December 10, 2002	Palomar	NEAT	·	2.4 km	MPC · JPL
360500	2003 AK_{5}	—	January 1, 2003	Socorro	LINEAR	·	2.7 km	MPC · JPL

== 360501–360600 ==
back to top

Designation			Discovery			Properties		Ref
Permanent	Provisional	Named after	Date	Site	Discoverer(s)	Category	Diam.	Ref
360501	2003 BW_{14}	—	January 26, 2003	Haleakala	NEAT	·	2.5 km	MPC · JPL
360502	2003 EO_{16}	—	March 9, 2003	Anderson Mesa	LONEOS	ATE	250 m	MPC · JPL
360503	2003 GE_{49}	—	April 9, 2003	Kitt Peak	Spacewatch	·	1.1 km	MPC · JPL
360504	2003 HH_{33}	—	April 26, 2003	Kitt Peak	Spacewatch	·	890 m	MPC · JPL
360505	2003 HM_{55}	—	April 25, 2003	Campo Imperatore	CINEOS	·	870 m	MPC · JPL
360506	2003 JL_{14}	—	May 8, 2003	Haleakala	NEAT	·	3.5 km	MPC · JPL
360507	2003 MK	—	June 20, 2003	Nashville	Clingan, R.	·	2.0 km	MPC · JPL
360508	2003 NN_{12}	—	July 4, 2003	Kitt Peak	Spacewatch	·	3.1 km	MPC · JPL
360509	2003 OD_{3}	—	July 23, 2003	Wise	Polishook, D.	·	1.1 km	MPC · JPL
360510	2003 OQ_{4}	—	July 22, 2003	Haleakala	NEAT	·	1.3 km	MPC · JPL
360511	2003 OE_{7}	—	July 24, 2003	Campo Imperatore	CINEOS	·	1.1 km	MPC · JPL
360512	2003 OU_{14}	—	July 22, 2003	Palomar	NEAT	·	2.2 km	MPC · JPL
360513	2003 QE_{3}	—	August 19, 2003	Campo Imperatore	CINEOS	·	790 m	MPC · JPL
360514	2003 QM_{5}	—	August 21, 2003	Socorro	LINEAR	PHO	3.0 km	MPC · JPL
360515	2003 QO_{9}	—	August 20, 2003	Campo Imperatore	CINEOS	·	850 m	MPC · JPL
360516	2003 QQ_{11}	—	August 21, 2003	Haleakala	NEAT	NYS	1.4 km	MPC · JPL
360517	2003 QH_{18}	—	August 22, 2003	Palomar	NEAT	NYS	1.0 km	MPC · JPL
360518	2003 QX_{33}	—	August 22, 2003	Palomar	NEAT	·	1.5 km	MPC · JPL
360519	2003 QF_{49}	—	August 22, 2003	Palomar	NEAT	HYG	3.7 km	MPC · JPL
360520	2003 QY_{52}	—	August 23, 2003	Socorro	LINEAR	·	1.1 km	MPC · JPL
360521	2003 QD_{62}	—	August 23, 2003	Socorro	LINEAR	·	1.4 km	MPC · JPL
360522	2003 QQ_{71}	—	August 25, 2003	Palomar	NEAT	PHO	1.1 km	MPC · JPL
360523	2003 QS_{79}	—	August 28, 2003	Palomar	NEAT	·	2.5 km	MPC · JPL
360524	2003 QW_{84}	—	August 24, 2003	Palomar	NEAT	·	3.4 km	MPC · JPL
360525	2003 QK_{101}	—	August 29, 2003	Socorro	LINEAR	V	810 m	MPC · JPL
360526	2003 QU_{114}	—	August 19, 2003	Wise	Wise	TIR	3.2 km	MPC · JPL
360527	2003 RN_{11}	—	September 15, 2003	Haleakala	NEAT	·	1.9 km	MPC · JPL
360528	2003 RL_{20}	—	September 15, 2003	Anderson Mesa	LONEOS	·	1.5 km	MPC · JPL
360529	2003 SG_{34}	—	September 18, 2003	Kitt Peak	Spacewatch	·	1.3 km	MPC · JPL
360530	2003 SE_{42}	—	September 16, 2003	Anderson Mesa	LONEOS	H	550 m	MPC · JPL
360531	2003 SD_{79}	—	September 19, 2003	Kitt Peak	Spacewatch	T_{j} (2.93)	5.3 km	MPC · JPL
360532	2003 SD_{91}	—	September 18, 2003	Socorro	LINEAR	NYS	1.1 km	MPC · JPL
360533	2003 ST_{94}	—	September 19, 2003	Kitt Peak	Spacewatch	·	1.5 km	MPC · JPL
360534	2003 SG_{112}	—	September 21, 2003	Kitt Peak	Spacewatch	·	880 m	MPC · JPL
360535	2003 SN_{124}	—	September 18, 2003	Kitt Peak	Spacewatch	·	1.2 km	MPC · JPL
360536	2003 SM_{128}	—	September 20, 2003	Socorro	LINEAR	·	1.3 km	MPC · JPL
360537	2003 SB_{131}	—	September 20, 2003	Palomar	NEAT	H	590 m	MPC · JPL
360538	2003 SA_{145}	—	September 19, 2003	Palomar	NEAT	H	770 m	MPC · JPL
360539	2003 SE_{171}	—	September 25, 2003	Palomar	NEAT	·	5.5 km	MPC · JPL
360540	2003 SQ_{197}	—	September 22, 2003	Anderson Mesa	LONEOS	·	3.8 km	MPC · JPL
360541	2003 SY_{207}	—	September 26, 2003	Socorro	LINEAR	·	1.6 km	MPC · JPL
360542	2003 SX_{212}	—	September 25, 2003	Haleakala	NEAT	·	2.2 km	MPC · JPL
360543	2003 SF_{228}	—	September 28, 2003	Kitt Peak	Spacewatch	·	1.4 km	MPC · JPL
360544	2003 SV_{233}	—	September 25, 2003	Haleakala	NEAT	NYS	1.1 km	MPC · JPL
360545	2003 SQ_{263}	—	September 28, 2003	Socorro	LINEAR	V	750 m	MPC · JPL
360546	2003 SZ_{282}	—	September 20, 2003	Kitt Peak	Spacewatch	·	2.0 km	MPC · JPL
360547	2003 SF_{294}	—	September 28, 2003	Socorro	LINEAR	H	650 m	MPC · JPL
360548	2003 SQ_{313}	—	August 31, 2003	Haleakala	NEAT	·	1.5 km	MPC · JPL
360549	2003 SS_{319}	—	September 28, 2003	Socorro	LINEAR	·	1.2 km	MPC · JPL
360550	2003 SR_{328}	—	September 21, 2003	Kitt Peak	Spacewatch	MAS	660 m	MPC · JPL
360551	2003 SS_{328}	—	September 21, 2003	Kitt Peak	Spacewatch	MAS	740 m	MPC · JPL
360552	2003 SD_{332}	—	September 27, 2003	Apache Point	SDSS	PHO	940 m	MPC · JPL
360553	2003 SS_{338}	—	September 26, 2003	Apache Point	SDSS	NYS	1.2 km	MPC · JPL
360554	2003 SC_{353}	—	September 20, 2003	Kitt Peak	Spacewatch	V	780 m	MPC · JPL
360555	2003 SU_{354}	—	September 22, 2003	Palomar	NEAT	·	1.5 km	MPC · JPL
360556	2003 SG_{363}	—	September 22, 2003	Kitt Peak	Spacewatch	·	950 m	MPC · JPL
360557	2003 SW_{386}	—	October 2, 2003	Kitt Peak	Spacewatch	·	1.2 km	MPC · JPL
360558	2003 SV_{399}	—	September 26, 2003	Apache Point	SDSS	THB	3.4 km	MPC · JPL
360559	2003 TT_{2}	—	October 2, 2003	Goodricke-Pigott	Kessel, J. W.	·	1.5 km	MPC · JPL
360560	2003 TC_{11}	—	October 14, 2003	Anderson Mesa	LONEOS	·	2.1 km	MPC · JPL
360561	2003 TG_{37}	—	October 2, 2003	Kitt Peak	Spacewatch	PHO	750 m	MPC · JPL
360562	2003 TM_{50}	—	October 4, 2003	Kitt Peak	Spacewatch	·	5.1 km	MPC · JPL
360563	2003 UM_{12}	—	October 21, 2003	Kitt Peak	Spacewatch	·	520 m	MPC · JPL
360564	2003 UM_{13}	—	October 18, 2003	Palomar	NEAT	H	760 m	MPC · JPL
360565	2003 UT_{46}	—	October 18, 2003	Kitt Peak	Spacewatch	NYS	1.0 km	MPC · JPL
360566	2003 UX_{46}	—	October 19, 2003	Kitt Peak	Spacewatch	(5)	1.2 km	MPC · JPL
360567	2003 UV_{48}	—	October 16, 2003	Anderson Mesa	LONEOS	PHO	1.2 km	MPC · JPL
360568	2003 UO_{66}	—	October 16, 2003	Palomar	NEAT	PHO	1.5 km	MPC · JPL
360569	2003 UP_{93}	—	October 18, 2003	Kitt Peak	Spacewatch	V	690 m	MPC · JPL
360570	2003 UN_{95}	—	October 18, 2003	Kitt Peak	Spacewatch	·	1.7 km	MPC · JPL
360571	2003 UL_{115}	—	October 20, 2003	Palomar	NEAT	·	1.6 km	MPC · JPL
360572	2003 UU_{123}	—	October 19, 2003	Kitt Peak	Spacewatch	·	1.8 km	MPC · JPL
360573	2003 UU_{128}	—	October 21, 2003	Kitt Peak	Spacewatch	·	1.4 km	MPC · JPL
360574	2003 UG_{156}	—	October 20, 2003	Socorro	LINEAR	·	1.6 km	MPC · JPL
360575	2003 UT_{160}	—	October 21, 2003	Kitt Peak	Spacewatch	·	1.1 km	MPC · JPL
360576	2003 UZ_{186}	—	October 22, 2003	Kitt Peak	Spacewatch	·	1.1 km	MPC · JPL
360577	2003 UL_{191}	—	October 23, 2003	Anderson Mesa	LONEOS	·	1.3 km	MPC · JPL
360578	2003 UH_{203}	—	October 21, 2003	Kitt Peak	Spacewatch	·	1.4 km	MPC · JPL
360579	2003 UX_{203}	—	October 21, 2003	Kitt Peak	Spacewatch	NYS	1.4 km	MPC · JPL
360580	2003 UB_{241}	—	October 24, 2003	Kitt Peak	Spacewatch	(5)	1.2 km	MPC · JPL
360581	2003 UU_{277}	—	October 5, 2003	Kitt Peak	Spacewatch	CYB	4.9 km	MPC · JPL
360582	2003 UZ_{317}	—	October 19, 2003	Apache Point	SDSS	·	1.0 km	MPC · JPL
360583	2003 UY_{324}	—	October 8, 2004	Kitt Peak	Spacewatch	·	3.9 km	MPC · JPL
360584	2003 UY_{331}	—	October 18, 2003	Apache Point	SDSS	V	650 m	MPC · JPL
360585	2003 UW_{357}	—	October 19, 2003	Kitt Peak	Spacewatch	·	1.1 km	MPC · JPL
360586	2003 UD_{362}	—	October 20, 2003	Kitt Peak	Spacewatch	·	1.9 km	MPC · JPL
360587	2003 UE_{406}	—	October 23, 2003	Apache Point	SDSS	·	1.7 km	MPC · JPL
360588	2003 WF_{75}	—	November 18, 2003	Kitt Peak	Spacewatch	V	870 m	MPC · JPL
360589	2003 WN_{79}	—	November 20, 2003	Socorro	LINEAR	·	1.8 km	MPC · JPL
360590	2003 WV_{108}	—	November 20, 2003	Socorro	LINEAR	SUL	3.0 km	MPC · JPL
360591	2003 WQ_{138}	—	November 21, 2003	Socorro	LINEAR	BAR	1.4 km	MPC · JPL
360592	2003 WA_{148}	—	November 23, 2003	Kitt Peak	Spacewatch	H	690 m	MPC · JPL
360593	2003 WF_{159}	—	November 29, 2003	Socorro	LINEAR	H	780 m	MPC · JPL
360594	2003 YA_{44}	—	December 19, 2003	Kitt Peak	Spacewatch	·	1.1 km	MPC · JPL
360595	2003 YZ_{45}	—	December 17, 2003	Socorro	LINEAR	(5)	1.2 km	MPC · JPL
360596	2003 YR_{56}	—	December 19, 2003	Socorro	LINEAR	·	1.4 km	MPC · JPL
360597	2003 YX_{77}	—	December 18, 2003	Socorro	LINEAR	·	2.5 km	MPC · JPL
360598	2003 YK_{91}	—	December 20, 2003	Socorro	LINEAR	(5)	1.3 km	MPC · JPL
360599	2003 YE_{128}	—	December 27, 2003	Socorro	LINEAR	·	1.7 km	MPC · JPL
360600	2003 YZ_{166}	—	December 17, 2003	Kitt Peak	Spacewatch	EUN	1.7 km	MPC · JPL

== 360601–360700 ==
back to top

Designation			Discovery			Properties		Ref
Permanent	Provisional	Named after	Date	Site	Discoverer(s)	Category	Diam.	Ref
360601	2003 YU_{168}	—	December 18, 2003	Socorro	LINEAR	·	1.4 km	MPC · JPL
360602	2003 YL_{171}	—	December 18, 2003	Kitt Peak	Spacewatch	·	1.3 km	MPC · JPL
360603	2004 BO_{8}	—	January 17, 2004	Kitt Peak	Spacewatch	·	1.4 km	MPC · JPL
360604	2004 BY_{52}	—	January 21, 2004	Socorro	LINEAR	·	1.7 km	MPC · JPL
360605	2004 BM_{71}	—	January 22, 2004	Socorro	LINEAR	·	1.7 km	MPC · JPL
360606	2004 BO_{71}	—	January 22, 2004	Socorro	LINEAR	·	1.9 km	MPC · JPL
360607	2004 BF_{82}	—	January 27, 2004	Anderson Mesa	LONEOS	·	1.7 km	MPC · JPL
360608	2004 BF_{83}	—	January 28, 2004	Kitt Peak	Spacewatch	·	1.6 km	MPC · JPL
360609	2004 BY_{85}	—	January 29, 2004	Socorro	LINEAR	BAR	1.5 km	MPC · JPL
360610	2004 BH_{113}	—	January 28, 2004	Catalina	CSS	·	1.6 km	MPC · JPL
360611	2004 BU_{118}	—	January 30, 2004	Catalina	CSS	·	2.0 km	MPC · JPL
360612	2004 BY_{126}	—	January 16, 2004	Kitt Peak	Spacewatch	·	1.3 km	MPC · JPL
360613	2004 CF_{6}	—	January 23, 2004	Socorro	LINEAR	·	1.4 km	MPC · JPL
360614	2004 CS_{54}	—	February 11, 2004	Palomar	NEAT	·	1.6 km	MPC · JPL
360615	2004 CJ_{58}	—	January 28, 2004	Catalina	CSS	·	1.7 km	MPC · JPL
360616	2004 CP_{79}	—	February 11, 2004	Palomar	NEAT	·	1.8 km	MPC · JPL
360617	2004 CM_{81}	—	February 12, 2004	Kitt Peak	Spacewatch	·	2.0 km	MPC · JPL
360618	2004 CT_{104}	—	February 13, 2004	Palomar	NEAT	·	1.5 km	MPC · JPL
360619	2004 DX_{6}	—	February 16, 2004	Kitt Peak	Spacewatch	EUN	1.7 km	MPC · JPL
360620	2004 DU_{32}	—	February 18, 2004	Socorro	LINEAR	·	1.9 km	MPC · JPL
360621	2004 DC_{39}	—	February 22, 2004	Kitt Peak	Spacewatch	EUN	1.3 km	MPC · JPL
360622	2004 DW_{55}	—	February 12, 2004	Kitt Peak	Spacewatch	·	1.3 km	MPC · JPL
360623	2004 DS_{57}	—	February 12, 2004	Kitt Peak	Spacewatch	·	1.5 km	MPC · JPL
360624	2004 EU_{32}	—	March 15, 2004	Palomar	NEAT	JUN	1.4 km	MPC · JPL
360625	2004 ES_{34}	—	March 12, 2004	Palomar	NEAT	·	2.7 km	MPC · JPL
360626	2004 EV_{46}	—	March 15, 2004	Kitt Peak	Spacewatch	·	2.2 km	MPC · JPL
360627	2004 EP_{49}	—	March 15, 2004	Kitt Peak	Spacewatch	·	2.0 km	MPC · JPL
360628	2004 ET_{53}	—	March 15, 2004	Socorro	LINEAR	·	2.2 km	MPC · JPL
360629	2004 EM_{81}	—	March 15, 2004	Socorro	LINEAR	·	2.6 km	MPC · JPL
360630	2004 EG_{95}	—	March 15, 2004	Socorro	LINEAR	JUN	1.1 km	MPC · JPL
360631	2004 FT_{44}	—	March 16, 2004	Socorro	LINEAR	GAL	2.0 km	MPC · JPL
360632	2004 FL_{53}	—	March 17, 2004	Kitt Peak	Spacewatch	·	2.0 km	MPC · JPL
360633	2004 FD_{58}	—	March 17, 2004	Kitt Peak	Spacewatch	·	2.2 km	MPC · JPL
360634	2004 FK_{96}	—	March 23, 2004	Socorro	LINEAR	·	2.3 km	MPC · JPL
360635	2004 FB_{101}	—	March 23, 2004	Socorro	LINEAR	EUN	1.2 km	MPC · JPL
360636	2004 FA_{130}	—	March 21, 2004	Kitt Peak	Spacewatch	EUN	1.5 km	MPC · JPL
360637	2004 FF_{138}	—	March 29, 2004	Kitt Peak	Spacewatch	·	1.8 km	MPC · JPL
360638	2004 FJ_{146}	—	March 31, 2004	Kitt Peak	Spacewatch	·	1.9 km	MPC · JPL
360639	2004 GC_{55}	—	April 13, 2004	Kitt Peak	Spacewatch	·	1.5 km	MPC · JPL
360640	2004 HU_{4}	—	April 16, 2004	Socorro	LINEAR	JUN	1.1 km	MPC · JPL
360641	2004 HU_{7}	—	April 19, 2004	Socorro	LINEAR	·	2.2 km	MPC · JPL
360642	2004 HM_{50}	—	April 23, 2004	Socorro	LINEAR	·	1.7 km	MPC · JPL
360643	2004 HY_{53}	—	April 16, 2004	Siding Spring	SSS	·	1.9 km	MPC · JPL
360644	2004 JL_{45}	—	May 15, 2004	Socorro	LINEAR	(18466)	3.1 km	MPC · JPL
360645	2004 KF_{14}	—	April 17, 2004	Socorro	LINEAR	·	2.6 km	MPC · JPL
360646	2004 LF_{16}	—	June 12, 2004	Socorro	LINEAR	·	2.8 km	MPC · JPL
360647	2004 LJ_{18}	—	June 12, 2004	Socorro	LINEAR	·	2.5 km	MPC · JPL
360648	2004 NE_{4}	—	July 12, 2004	Palomar	NEAT	·	3.6 km	MPC · JPL
360649	2004 OA_{6}	—	July 18, 2004	Reedy Creek	J. Broughton	·	3.4 km	MPC · JPL
360650	2004 PW_{7}	—	August 6, 2004	Palomar	NEAT	·	4.1 km	MPC · JPL
360651	2004 QY_{6}	—	August 21, 2004	Reedy Creek	J. Broughton	·	700 m	MPC · JPL
360652	2004 QD_{18}	—	August 20, 2004	Kitt Peak	Spacewatch	EOS	2.4 km	MPC · JPL
360653	2004 RV_{8}	—	September 6, 2004	Goodricke-Pigott	Goodricke-Pigott	·	790 m	MPC · JPL
360654	2004 RK_{10}	—	September 7, 2004	Socorro	LINEAR	PHO	2.6 km	MPC · JPL
360655	2004 RO_{22}	—	September 7, 2004	Kitt Peak	Spacewatch	·	2.4 km	MPC · JPL
360656	2004 RG_{24}	—	September 7, 2004	Socorro	LINEAR	·	4.9 km	MPC · JPL
360657	2004 RL_{28}	—	September 6, 2004	Siding Spring	SSS	·	3.0 km	MPC · JPL
360658	2004 RS_{54}	—	September 8, 2004	Socorro	LINEAR	·	820 m	MPC · JPL
360659	2004 RR_{63}	—	September 8, 2004	Socorro	LINEAR	·	3.1 km	MPC · JPL
360660	2004 RM_{73}	—	September 8, 2004	Socorro	LINEAR	·	790 m	MPC · JPL
360661	2004 RD_{76}	—	September 8, 2004	Socorro	LINEAR	·	870 m	MPC · JPL
360662	2004 RB_{104}	—	September 8, 2004	Palomar	NEAT	·	750 m	MPC · JPL
360663	2004 RR_{117}	—	September 7, 2004	Kitt Peak	Spacewatch	·	2.7 km	MPC · JPL
360664	2004 RB_{136}	—	September 7, 2004	Kitt Peak	Spacewatch	·	2.6 km	MPC · JPL
360665	2004 RY_{148}	—	September 9, 2004	Socorro	LINEAR	·	680 m	MPC · JPL
360666	2004 RE_{155}	—	September 10, 2004	Socorro	LINEAR	T_{j} (2.98)	4.8 km	MPC · JPL
360667	2004 RD_{163}	—	September 11, 2004	Kitt Peak	Spacewatch	·	670 m	MPC · JPL
360668	2004 RT_{167}	—	September 7, 2004	Palomar	NEAT	·	3.0 km	MPC · JPL
360669	2004 RT_{172}	—	September 9, 2004	Kitt Peak	Spacewatch	·	2.6 km	MPC · JPL
360670	2004 RU_{175}	—	September 10, 2004	Socorro	LINEAR	T_{j} (2.96) · CYB	4.8 km	MPC · JPL
360671	2004 RV_{177}	—	September 10, 2004	Socorro	LINEAR	·	3.9 km	MPC · JPL
360672	2004 RF_{186}	—	September 10, 2004	Socorro	LINEAR	TEL	1.6 km	MPC · JPL
360673	2004 RD_{212}	—	September 11, 2004	Socorro	LINEAR	·	3.6 km	MPC · JPL
360674	2004 RJ_{216}	—	September 11, 2004	Socorro	LINEAR	·	5.3 km	MPC · JPL
360675	2004 RL_{225}	—	September 9, 2004	Socorro	LINEAR	·	3.4 km	MPC · JPL
360676	2004 RN_{225}	—	September 9, 2004	Socorro	LINEAR	·	1.1 km	MPC · JPL
360677	2004 RV_{238}	—	September 10, 2004	Kitt Peak	Spacewatch	·	2.6 km	MPC · JPL
360678	2004 RN_{243}	—	September 10, 2004	Kitt Peak	Spacewatch	·	3.6 km	MPC · JPL
360679	2004 RJ_{255}	—	September 6, 2004	Palomar	NEAT	TIR	3.9 km	MPC · JPL
360680	2004 RJ_{268}	—	September 11, 2004	Kitt Peak	Spacewatch	·	2.3 km	MPC · JPL
360681	2004 RE_{272}	—	September 11, 2004	Kitt Peak	Spacewatch	·	2.2 km	MPC · JPL
360682	2004 RT_{274}	—	September 11, 2004	Socorro	LINEAR	·	4.0 km	MPC · JPL
360683	2004 RA_{299}	—	September 11, 2004	Kitt Peak	Spacewatch	·	1.9 km	MPC · JPL
360684	2004 RU_{311}	—	September 14, 2004	Socorro	LINEAR	·	3.7 km	MPC · JPL
360685	2004 RS_{317}	—	September 12, 2004	Kitt Peak	Spacewatch	EOS	2.0 km	MPC · JPL
360686	2004 RE_{334}	—	September 15, 2004	Anderson Mesa	LONEOS	·	2.8 km	MPC · JPL
360687	2004 RP_{340}	—	September 7, 2004	Socorro	LINEAR	·	2.3 km	MPC · JPL
360688	2004 RU_{356}	—	September 9, 2004	Kitt Peak	Spacewatch	·	3.0 km	MPC · JPL
360689	2004 SB_{19}	—	September 18, 2004	Socorro	LINEAR	·	690 m	MPC · JPL
360690	2004 SV_{20}	—	September 17, 2004	Socorro	LINEAR	·	1.2 km	MPC · JPL
360691	2004 SA_{32}	—	September 17, 2004	Socorro	LINEAR	·	810 m	MPC · JPL
360692	2004 SQ_{37}	—	September 17, 2004	Kitt Peak	Spacewatch	·	3.2 km	MPC · JPL
360693	2004 SF_{47}	—	September 18, 2004	Socorro	LINEAR	·	840 m	MPC · JPL
360694	2004 SA_{49}	—	September 21, 2004	Socorro	LINEAR	·	680 m	MPC · JPL
360695	2004 SH_{49}	—	September 21, 2004	Socorro	LINEAR	·	3.3 km	MPC · JPL
360696	2004 SE_{58}	—	September 16, 2004	Anderson Mesa	LONEOS	·	3.6 km	MPC · JPL
360697	2004 TP_{9}	—	September 8, 2004	Socorro	LINEAR	PHO	1.0 km	MPC · JPL
360698	2004 TP_{12}	—	October 9, 2004	Anderson Mesa	LONEOS	·	690 m	MPC · JPL
360699	2004 TM_{20}	—	September 22, 2004	Kitt Peak	Spacewatch	·	870 m	MPC · JPL
360700	2004 TX_{20}	—	October 11, 2004	Kitt Peak	Spacewatch	·	690 m	MPC · JPL

== 360701–360800 ==
back to top

Designation			Discovery			Properties		Ref
Permanent	Provisional	Named after	Date	Site	Discoverer(s)	Category	Diam.	Ref
360701	2004 TP_{32}	—	October 4, 2004	Kitt Peak	Spacewatch	·	770 m	MPC · JPL
360702	2004 TD_{33}	—	October 4, 2004	Kitt Peak	Spacewatch	(2076)	940 m	MPC · JPL
360703	2004 TD_{34}	—	October 4, 2004	Kitt Peak	Spacewatch	·	810 m	MPC · JPL
360704	2004 TX_{38}	—	October 4, 2004	Kitt Peak	Spacewatch	·	760 m	MPC · JPL
360705	2004 TX_{50}	—	October 4, 2004	Kitt Peak	Spacewatch	·	800 m	MPC · JPL
360706	2004 TF_{52}	—	October 4, 2004	Kitt Peak	Spacewatch	LUT	6.1 km	MPC · JPL
360707	2004 TC_{56}	—	October 4, 2004	Kitt Peak	Spacewatch	CYB	4.5 km	MPC · JPL
360708	2004 TZ_{66}	—	October 5, 2004	Anderson Mesa	LONEOS	·	4.1 km	MPC · JPL
360709	2004 TG_{74}	—	October 6, 2004	Kitt Peak	Spacewatch	·	1.4 km	MPC · JPL
360710	2004 TH_{79}	—	October 4, 2004	Anderson Mesa	LONEOS	·	1.0 km	MPC · JPL
360711	2004 TZ_{89}	—	October 5, 2004	Kitt Peak	Spacewatch	·	780 m	MPC · JPL
360712	2004 TL_{93}	—	October 5, 2004	Kitt Peak	Spacewatch	·	2.8 km	MPC · JPL
360713	2004 TO_{102}	—	October 6, 2004	Palomar	NEAT	·	1.1 km	MPC · JPL
360714	2004 TO_{103}	—	October 7, 2004	Kitt Peak	Spacewatch	EOS	2.0 km	MPC · JPL
360715	2004 TC_{107}	—	October 7, 2004	Socorro	LINEAR	·	2.1 km	MPC · JPL
360716	2004 TN_{109}	—	October 7, 2004	Socorro	LINEAR	·	930 m	MPC · JPL
360717	2004 TE_{120}	—	November 29, 1999	Kitt Peak	Spacewatch	·	3.5 km	MPC · JPL
360718	2004 TC_{130}	—	October 7, 2004	Socorro	LINEAR	·	3.4 km	MPC · JPL
360719	2004 TW_{131}	—	October 7, 2004	Anderson Mesa	LONEOS	·	1.0 km	MPC · JPL
360720	2004 TG_{134}	—	October 7, 2004	Palomar	NEAT	·	3.6 km	MPC · JPL
360721	2004 TX_{137}	—	October 8, 2004	Anderson Mesa	LONEOS	·	1.1 km	MPC · JPL
360722	2004 TS_{139}	—	October 9, 2004	Anderson Mesa	LONEOS	·	4.3 km	MPC · JPL
360723	2004 TD_{152}	—	October 6, 2004	Kitt Peak	Spacewatch	·	930 m	MPC · JPL
360724	2004 TD_{179}	—	October 7, 2004	Kitt Peak	Spacewatch	·	660 m	MPC · JPL
360725	2004 TT_{201}	—	October 7, 2004	Kitt Peak	Spacewatch	·	920 m	MPC · JPL
360726	2004 TD_{225}	—	October 8, 2004	Kitt Peak	Spacewatch	·	2.7 km	MPC · JPL
360727	2004 TN_{226}	—	October 8, 2004	Kitt Peak	Spacewatch	·	2.8 km	MPC · JPL
360728	2004 TZ_{237}	—	October 9, 2004	Kitt Peak	Spacewatch	·	800 m	MPC · JPL
360729	2004 TK_{247}	—	October 7, 2004	Socorro	LINEAR	·	4.1 km	MPC · JPL
360730	2004 TC_{273}	—	October 9, 2004	Kitt Peak	Spacewatch	·	4.1 km	MPC · JPL
360731	2004 TT_{282}	—	October 7, 2004	Socorro	LINEAR	PHO	890 m	MPC · JPL
360732	2004 TH_{285}	—	October 8, 2004	Kitt Peak	Spacewatch	·	780 m	MPC · JPL
360733	2004 TM_{302}	—	October 9, 2004	Socorro	LINEAR	·	1.2 km	MPC · JPL
360734	2004 TL_{318}	—	October 11, 2004	Kitt Peak	Spacewatch	·	750 m	MPC · JPL
360735	2004 TH_{348}	—	October 4, 2004	Kitt Peak	Spacewatch	·	3.2 km	MPC · JPL
360736	2004 TP_{355}	—	August 11, 2004	Socorro	LINEAR	·	3.6 km	MPC · JPL
360737	2004 TF_{368}	—	October 14, 2004	Kitt Peak	Spacewatch	·	930 m	MPC · JPL
360738	2004 UD_{1}	—	October 16, 2004	Pla D'Arguines	R. Ferrando	·	2.2 km	MPC · JPL
360739	2004 UN_{5}	—	October 15, 2004	Mount Lemmon	Mount Lemmon Survey	·	1 km	MPC · JPL
360740	2004 UE_{11}	—	October 21, 2004	Socorro	LINEAR	·	1.1 km	MPC · JPL
360741	2004 VU_{17}	—	November 3, 2004	Palomar	NEAT	HYG	3.6 km	MPC · JPL
360742	2004 VR_{18}	—	November 4, 2004	Kitt Peak	Spacewatch	EOS	3.0 km	MPC · JPL
360743	2004 VN_{23}	—	November 5, 2004	Palomar	NEAT	·	1.5 km	MPC · JPL
360744	2004 VB_{30}	—	October 23, 2004	Kitt Peak	Spacewatch	·	4.7 km	MPC · JPL
360745	2004 VG_{30}	—	November 3, 2004	Kitt Peak	Spacewatch	·	3.7 km	MPC · JPL
360746	2004 VC_{39}	—	November 4, 2004	Kitt Peak	Spacewatch	·	4.8 km	MPC · JPL
360747	2004 VP_{66}	—	November 4, 2004	Catalina	CSS	·	4.3 km	MPC · JPL
360748	2004 VA_{71}	—	November 7, 2004	Socorro	LINEAR	·	1.2 km	MPC · JPL
360749	2004 VE_{76}	—	November 12, 2004	Catalina	CSS	·	990 m	MPC · JPL
360750	2004 WY_{5}	—	November 19, 2004	Socorro	LINEAR	·	1.1 km	MPC · JPL
360751	2004 XG_{48}	—	December 10, 2004	Socorro	LINEAR	·	1.5 km	MPC · JPL
360752	2004 XM_{57}	—	December 10, 2004	Kitt Peak	Spacewatch	·	1.2 km	MPC · JPL
360753	2004 XV_{78}	—	December 10, 2004	Socorro	LINEAR	·	1.2 km	MPC · JPL
360754	2004 XQ_{89}	—	December 11, 2004	Socorro	LINEAR	·	880 m	MPC · JPL
360755	2004 XG_{106}	—	December 11, 2004	Socorro	LINEAR	·	880 m	MPC · JPL
360756	2004 XF_{123}	—	December 10, 2004	Socorro	LINEAR	·	1.4 km	MPC · JPL
360757	2004 XQ_{134}	—	December 2, 2004	Kitt Peak	Spacewatch	·	1.5 km	MPC · JPL
360758	2004 XF_{137}	—	December 15, 2004	Socorro	LINEAR	·	1.2 km	MPC · JPL
360759	2004 XC_{164}	—	December 3, 2004	Anderson Mesa	LONEOS	·	1.6 km	MPC · JPL
360760	2004 XF_{167}	—	November 3, 2004	Palomar	NEAT	·	1.0 km	MPC · JPL
360761	2004 XY_{180}	—	December 15, 2004	Campo Imperatore	CINEOS	NYS	1.5 km	MPC · JPL
360762 FRIPON	2005 AT	FRIPON	January 4, 2005	Vicques	M. Ory	MAS	830 m	MPC · JPL
360763	2005 AN_{1}	—	January 1, 2005	Catalina	CSS	·	1.8 km	MPC · JPL
360764	2005 AH_{49}	—	December 16, 2004	Uccle	T. Pauwels	(5)	1.2 km	MPC · JPL
360765	2005 BS_{2}	—	January 17, 2005	Socorro	LINEAR	H	710 m	MPC · JPL
360766	2005 BN_{9}	—	January 16, 2005	Socorro	LINEAR	EUN	1.3 km	MPC · JPL
360767	2005 BG_{38}	—	January 16, 2005	Mauna Kea	Veillet, C.	·	1.7 km	MPC · JPL
360768	2005 BQ_{40}	—	January 16, 2005	Mauna Kea	Veillet, C.	·	1.4 km	MPC · JPL
360769	2005 CT_{2}	—	February 1, 2005	Kitt Peak	Spacewatch	H	780 m	MPC · JPL
360770	2005 CV_{14}	—	February 2, 2005	Kitt Peak	Spacewatch	MAS	730 m	MPC · JPL
360771	2005 CZ_{14}	—	February 2, 2005	Kitt Peak	Spacewatch	·	1.3 km	MPC · JPL
360772	2005 CU_{16}	—	February 2, 2005	Socorro	LINEAR	·	1.4 km	MPC · JPL
360773	2005 CG_{73}	—	February 1, 2005	Kitt Peak	Spacewatch	·	1.1 km	MPC · JPL
360774	2005 CJ_{79}	—	February 2, 2005	Kitt Peak	Spacewatch	V	770 m	MPC · JPL
360775	2005 EK_{20}	—	March 3, 2005	Catalina	CSS	(5)	1.2 km	MPC · JPL
360776	2005 EB_{39}	—	March 4, 2005	Socorro	LINEAR	·	1.5 km	MPC · JPL
360777	2005 EU_{42}	—	March 3, 2005	Kitt Peak	Spacewatch	·	1.2 km	MPC · JPL
360778	2005 EK_{95}	—	March 9, 2005	Anderson Mesa	LONEOS	H	720 m	MPC · JPL
360779	2005 EP_{183}	—	March 9, 2005	Mount Lemmon	Mount Lemmon Survey	3:2	4.5 km	MPC · JPL
360780	2005 EM_{186}	—	March 10, 2005	Anderson Mesa	LONEOS	·	1.6 km	MPC · JPL
360781	2005 ES_{224}	—	March 8, 2005	Socorro	LINEAR	H	630 m	MPC · JPL
360782	2005 EK_{271}	—	March 10, 2005	Anderson Mesa	LONEOS	·	1.9 km	MPC · JPL
360783	2005 EG_{293}	—	March 10, 2005	Kitt Peak	Spacewatch	H	620 m	MPC · JPL
360784	2005 FA_{5}	—	March 8, 2005	Mount Lemmon	Mount Lemmon Survey	·	1 km	MPC · JPL
360785	2005 FQ_{8}	—	March 22, 2005	Socorro	LINEAR	H	870 m	MPC · JPL
360786	2005 GJ_{6}	—	April 1, 2005	Kitt Peak	Spacewatch	·	1.4 km	MPC · JPL
360787	2005 GO_{24}	—	April 2, 2005	Mount Lemmon	Mount Lemmon Survey	·	1.4 km	MPC · JPL
360788	2005 GX_{31}	—	April 4, 2005	Socorro	LINEAR	H	770 m	MPC · JPL
360789	2005 GS_{40}	—	April 4, 2005	Mount Lemmon	Mount Lemmon Survey	MAR	1.6 km	MPC · JPL
360790	2005 GN_{42}	—	April 5, 2005	Mount Lemmon	Mount Lemmon Survey	·	1.0 km	MPC · JPL
360791	2005 GP_{47}	—	April 5, 2005	Mount Lemmon	Mount Lemmon Survey	PHO	1.4 km	MPC · JPL
360792	2005 GR_{57}	—	April 6, 2005	Mount Lemmon	Mount Lemmon Survey	·	1.5 km	MPC · JPL
360793	2005 GU_{58}	—	April 3, 2005	Palomar	NEAT	·	1.8 km	MPC · JPL
360794	2005 GT_{87}	—	April 4, 2005	Mount Lemmon	Mount Lemmon Survey	·	1.4 km	MPC · JPL
360795	2005 GA_{98}	—	April 7, 2005	Mount Lemmon	Mount Lemmon Survey	·	940 m	MPC · JPL
360796	2005 GP_{103}	—	March 10, 2005	Mount Lemmon	Mount Lemmon Survey	3:2 · SHU	4.6 km	MPC · JPL
360797	2005 GF_{114}	—	April 9, 2005	Catalina	CSS	H	810 m	MPC · JPL
360798	2005 GR_{127}	—	April 4, 2005	Catalina	CSS	H	870 m	MPC · JPL
360799	2005 GT_{131}	—	April 10, 2005	Kitt Peak	Spacewatch	·	1.2 km	MPC · JPL
360800	2005 GP_{150}	—	April 11, 2005	Kitt Peak	Spacewatch	·	1.3 km	MPC · JPL

== 360801–360900 ==
back to top

Designation			Discovery			Properties		Ref
Permanent	Provisional	Named after	Date	Site	Discoverer(s)	Category	Diam.	Ref
360801	2005 GJ_{156}	—	April 10, 2005	Mount Lemmon	Mount Lemmon Survey	·	1.3 km	MPC · JPL
360802	2005 GN_{168}	—	April 12, 2005	Anderson Mesa	LONEOS	H	670 m	MPC · JPL
360803	2005 GG_{170}	—	April 12, 2005	Kitt Peak	Spacewatch	·	930 m	MPC · JPL
360804	2005 GZ_{189}	—	April 12, 2005	Kitt Peak	M. W. Buie	·	1.1 km	MPC · JPL
360805	2005 HW_{2}	—	April 17, 2005	Kitt Peak	Spacewatch	·	1.0 km	MPC · JPL
360806	2005 JA	—	May 2, 2005	Catalina	CSS	H	760 m	MPC · JPL
360807	2005 JB_{35}	—	May 4, 2005	Kitt Peak	Spacewatch	·	2.2 km	MPC · JPL
360808	2005 JM_{52}	—	May 4, 2005	Kitt Peak	Spacewatch	3:2	6.6 km	MPC · JPL
360809	2005 JH_{63}	—	May 3, 2005	Kitt Peak	Deep Lens Survey	H	800 m	MPC · JPL
360810	2005 JH_{68}	—	May 6, 2005	Socorro	LINEAR	·	2.0 km	MPC · JPL
360811	2005 JR_{68}	—	May 6, 2005	Socorro	LINEAR	·	1.4 km	MPC · JPL
360812	2005 JC_{72}	—	May 8, 2005	Kitt Peak	Spacewatch	·	930 m	MPC · JPL
360813	2005 JL_{74}	—	May 8, 2005	Mount Lemmon	Mount Lemmon Survey	·	3.0 km	MPC · JPL
360814	2005 JD_{77}	—	May 10, 2005	Mount Lemmon	Mount Lemmon Survey	MAS	850 m	MPC · JPL
360815	2005 JT_{84}	—	May 8, 2005	Mount Lemmon	Mount Lemmon Survey	·	1.2 km	MPC · JPL
360816	2005 JA_{118}	—	May 10, 2005	Kitt Peak	Spacewatch	(5)	1.4 km	MPC · JPL
360817	2005 JB_{125}	—	May 11, 2005	Kitt Peak	Spacewatch	EUN	1.3 km	MPC · JPL
360818	2005 JW_{131}	—	May 13, 2005	Kitt Peak	Spacewatch	·	1.9 km	MPC · JPL
360819	2005 JL_{148}	—	May 14, 2005	Catalina	CSS	BAR	1.5 km	MPC · JPL
360820	2005 JJ_{150}	—	May 3, 2005	Kitt Peak	Spacewatch	·	1.4 km	MPC · JPL
360821	2005 JV_{176}	—	May 14, 2005	Catalina	CSS	·	1.7 km	MPC · JPL
360822	2005 KG_{7}	—	May 19, 2005	Palomar	NEAT	·	1.7 km	MPC · JPL
360823	2005 KL_{7}	—	May 19, 2005	Palomar	NEAT	·	1.4 km	MPC · JPL
360824	2005 KO_{11}	—	May 28, 2005	Campo Imperatore	CINEOS	·	1.2 km	MPC · JPL
360825	2005 LV_{1}	—	June 1, 2005	Mount Lemmon	Mount Lemmon Survey	·	1.2 km	MPC · JPL
360826	2005 LM_{10}	—	June 3, 2005	Kitt Peak	Spacewatch	·	1.6 km	MPC · JPL
360827	2005 LG_{12}	—	June 4, 2005	Kitt Peak	Spacewatch	KON	2.2 km	MPC · JPL
360828	2005 LC_{13}	—	June 4, 2005	Kitt Peak	Spacewatch	·	1.2 km	MPC · JPL
360829	2005 LD_{31}	—	June 10, 2005	Catalina	CSS	·	2.4 km	MPC · JPL
360830	2005 LW_{40}	—	June 10, 2005	Kitt Peak	Spacewatch	·	1.3 km	MPC · JPL
360831	2005 LK_{48}	—	June 13, 2005	Mount Lemmon	Mount Lemmon Survey	·	1.4 km	MPC · JPL
360832	2005 LX_{52}	—	June 3, 2005	Siding Spring	SSS	·	2.3 km	MPC · JPL
360833	2005 MM_{12}	—	June 28, 2005	Palomar	NEAT	·	1.7 km	MPC · JPL
360834	2005 MK_{28}	—	June 29, 2005	Kitt Peak	Spacewatch	·	1.7 km	MPC · JPL
360835	2005 MO_{49}	—	June 30, 2005	Palomar	NEAT	EUN	1.4 km	MPC · JPL
360836	2005 NN_{3}	—	July 1, 2005	Kitt Peak	Spacewatch	EUN	1.5 km	MPC · JPL
360837	2005 NE_{10}	—	July 3, 2005	Mount Lemmon	Mount Lemmon Survey	·	1.8 km	MPC · JPL
360838	2005 NY_{10}	—	July 3, 2005	Mount Lemmon	Mount Lemmon Survey	·	1.7 km	MPC · JPL
360839	2005 ND_{16}	—	July 2, 2005	Kitt Peak	Spacewatch	·	2.0 km	MPC · JPL
360840	2005 NM_{35}	—	July 5, 2005	Kitt Peak	Spacewatch	HOF	2.9 km	MPC · JPL
360841	2005 NK_{63}	—	July 11, 2005	Bergisch Gladbach	W. Bickel	·	2.1 km	MPC · JPL
360842	2005 NE_{86}	—	July 3, 2005	Mount Lemmon	Mount Lemmon Survey	NEM	2.2 km	MPC · JPL
360843	2005 NG_{87}	—	July 3, 2005	Palomar	NEAT	JUN	1.2 km	MPC · JPL
360844	2005 OG_{17}	—	July 30, 2005	Palomar	NEAT	·	3.1 km	MPC · JPL
360845	2005 OW_{25}	—	July 31, 2005	Palomar	NEAT	·	2.2 km	MPC · JPL
360846	2005 QL_{3}	—	July 29, 2005	Palomar	NEAT	·	3.2 km	MPC · JPL
360847	2005 QN_{12}	—	August 6, 2005	Palomar	NEAT	·	2.4 km	MPC · JPL
360848	2005 QV_{16}	—	August 25, 2005	Palomar	NEAT	·	2.4 km	MPC · JPL
360849	2005 QC_{17}	—	August 25, 2005	Palomar	NEAT	·	2.0 km	MPC · JPL
360850	2005 QM_{23}	—	August 27, 2005	Anderson Mesa	LONEOS	·	2.6 km	MPC · JPL
360851	2005 QH_{42}	—	August 26, 2005	Anderson Mesa	LONEOS	·	2.3 km	MPC · JPL
360852	2005 QS_{47}	—	August 26, 2005	Palomar	NEAT	·	1.7 km	MPC · JPL
360853	2005 QP_{61}	—	August 26, 2005	Palomar	NEAT	·	1.9 km	MPC · JPL
360854	2005 QY_{65}	—	August 27, 2005	Anderson Mesa	LONEOS	·	2.2 km	MPC · JPL
360855	2005 QL_{73}	—	August 29, 2005	Anderson Mesa	LONEOS	·	3.4 km	MPC · JPL
360856	2005 QP_{115}	—	August 28, 2005	Anderson Mesa	LONEOS	·	3.1 km	MPC · JPL
360857	2005 QO_{121}	—	August 28, 2005	Kitt Peak	Spacewatch	·	1.5 km	MPC · JPL
360858	2005 QV_{122}	—	August 28, 2005	Kitt Peak	Spacewatch	·	1.8 km	MPC · JPL
360859	2005 QU_{130}	—	August 28, 2005	Kitt Peak	Spacewatch	·	3.2 km	MPC · JPL
360860	2005 QB_{132}	—	August 28, 2005	Kitt Peak	Spacewatch	·	2.0 km	MPC · JPL
360861	2005 QK_{137}	—	August 28, 2005	Kitt Peak	Spacewatch	KOR	1.5 km	MPC · JPL
360862	2005 QT_{158}	—	August 27, 2005	Palomar	NEAT	·	1.8 km	MPC · JPL
360863	2005 QQ_{180}	—	August 28, 2005	Kitt Peak	Spacewatch	·	1.9 km	MPC · JPL
360864	2005 QS_{188}	—	August 27, 2005	Palomar	NEAT	·	2.3 km	MPC · JPL
360865	2005 QA_{189}	—	August 31, 2005	Palomar	NEAT	·	3.1 km	MPC · JPL
360866	2005 RH_{7}	—	September 7, 2005	Campo Catino	Campo Catino Austral Observatory Survey	·	2.4 km	MPC · JPL
360867	2005 RE_{26}	—	September 12, 2005	Junk Bond	D. Healy	KOR	1.8 km	MPC · JPL
360868	2005 RD_{45}	—	September 9, 2005	Socorro	LINEAR	·	1.9 km	MPC · JPL
360869	2005 RJ_{46}	—	September 14, 2005	Apache Point	A. C. Becker	·	1.7 km	MPC · JPL
360870	2005 SK	—	September 20, 2005	Reedy Creek	J. Broughton	·	2.5 km	MPC · JPL
360871	2005 SM_{17}	—	September 26, 2005	Kitt Peak	Spacewatch	EOS	1.8 km	MPC · JPL
360872	2005 SP_{24}	—	September 24, 2005	Anderson Mesa	LONEOS	·	2.8 km	MPC · JPL
360873	2005 ST_{24}	—	September 24, 2005	Anderson Mesa	LONEOS	·	2.4 km	MPC · JPL
360874	2005 SJ_{29}	—	September 23, 2005	Kitt Peak	Spacewatch	·	2.5 km	MPC · JPL
360875	2005 SC_{36}	—	September 23, 2005	Kitt Peak	Spacewatch	·	2.5 km	MPC · JPL
360876	2005 ST_{36}	—	September 24, 2005	Kitt Peak	Spacewatch	·	1.7 km	MPC · JPL
360877	2005 SM_{44}	—	August 30, 2005	Palomar	NEAT	DOR	3.3 km	MPC · JPL
360878	2005 SU_{44}	—	September 24, 2005	Kitt Peak	Spacewatch	·	3.1 km	MPC · JPL
360879	2005 SS_{48}	—	September 24, 2005	Kitt Peak	Spacewatch	·	3.1 km	MPC · JPL
360880	2005 SO_{56}	—	September 25, 2005	Kitt Peak	Spacewatch	·	2.7 km	MPC · JPL
360881	2005 SH_{78}	—	September 24, 2005	Kitt Peak	Spacewatch	EUN	1.3 km	MPC · JPL
360882	2005 SN_{80}	—	September 24, 2005	Kitt Peak	Spacewatch	·	1.7 km	MPC · JPL
360883	2005 SN_{84}	—	September 24, 2005	Kitt Peak	Spacewatch	·	1.8 km	MPC · JPL
360884	2005 SH_{86}	—	September 24, 2005	Kitt Peak	Spacewatch	TEL	1.4 km	MPC · JPL
360885	2005 SD_{90}	—	September 24, 2005	Kitt Peak	Spacewatch	BRA	1.4 km	MPC · JPL
360886	2005 SD_{93}	—	September 24, 2005	Kitt Peak	Spacewatch	·	3.1 km	MPC · JPL
360887	2005 SB_{94}	—	September 25, 2005	Kitt Peak	Spacewatch	·	2.1 km	MPC · JPL
360888	2005 SY_{102}	—	September 25, 2005	Kitt Peak	Spacewatch	·	3.3 km	MPC · JPL
360889	2005 SH_{109}	—	September 26, 2005	Kitt Peak	Spacewatch	·	2.8 km	MPC · JPL
360890	2005 SB_{110}	—	September 26, 2005	Kitt Peak	Spacewatch	·	1.9 km	MPC · JPL
360891	2005 SP_{120}	—	September 29, 2005	Kitt Peak	Spacewatch	BRA	1.9 km	MPC · JPL
360892	2005 SB_{121}	—	September 29, 2005	Kitt Peak	Spacewatch	·	2.4 km	MPC · JPL
360893	2005 SP_{138}	—	September 25, 2005	Kitt Peak	Spacewatch	·	1.9 km	MPC · JPL
360894	2005 SY_{142}	—	September 25, 2005	Kitt Peak	Spacewatch	·	3.4 km	MPC · JPL
360895	2005 SJ_{145}	—	September 25, 2005	Kitt Peak	Spacewatch	KOR	1.6 km	MPC · JPL
360896	2005 SE_{150}	—	September 25, 2005	Kitt Peak	Spacewatch	·	2.9 km	MPC · JPL
360897	2005 SE_{152}	—	September 25, 2005	Kitt Peak	Spacewatch	·	2.7 km	MPC · JPL
360898	2005 SW_{152}	—	September 25, 2005	Kitt Peak	Spacewatch	EUP	3.7 km	MPC · JPL
360899	2005 SY_{156}	—	September 26, 2005	Kitt Peak	Spacewatch	·	1.7 km	MPC · JPL
360900	2005 SG_{157}	—	September 26, 2005	Kitt Peak	Spacewatch	·	2.1 km	MPC · JPL

== 360901–361000 ==
back to top

Designation			Discovery			Properties		Ref
Permanent	Provisional	Named after	Date	Site	Discoverer(s)	Category	Diam.	Ref
360901	2005 SV_{168}	—	September 29, 2005	Kitt Peak	Spacewatch	·	3.1 km	MPC · JPL
360902	2005 SX_{177}	—	September 29, 2005	Kitt Peak	Spacewatch	·	2.4 km	MPC · JPL
360903	2005 SE_{178}	—	September 29, 2005	Kitt Peak	Spacewatch	·	1.7 km	MPC · JPL
360904	2005 SB_{179}	—	September 1, 2005	Kitt Peak	Spacewatch	·	3.0 km	MPC · JPL
360905	2005 SN_{188}	—	September 25, 2005	Kitt Peak	Spacewatch	BRA	1.8 km	MPC · JPL
360906	2005 SQ_{200}	—	September 30, 2005	Kitt Peak	Spacewatch	KOR	1.5 km	MPC · JPL
360907	2005 SW_{206}	—	May 9, 2004	Kitt Peak	Spacewatch	(13314)	1.9 km	MPC · JPL
360908	2005 SL_{211}	—	September 24, 2005	Kitt Peak	Spacewatch	·	2.3 km	MPC · JPL
360909	2005 SL_{221}	—	September 30, 2005	Mount Lemmon	Mount Lemmon Survey	KOR	1.3 km	MPC · JPL
360910	2005 SL_{222}	—	September 23, 2005	Sierra Vista	D. Healy	·	3.1 km	MPC · JPL
360911	2005 SX_{235}	—	September 29, 2005	Kitt Peak	Spacewatch	·	2.0 km	MPC · JPL
360912	2005 ST_{239}	—	September 30, 2005	Mount Lemmon	Mount Lemmon Survey	·	1.7 km	MPC · JPL
360913	2005 SW_{239}	—	September 30, 2005	Kitt Peak	Spacewatch	·	2.6 km	MPC · JPL
360914	2005 SR_{263}	—	September 23, 2005	Kitt Peak	Spacewatch	EOS	2.2 km	MPC · JPL
360915	2005 SS_{282}	—	September 21, 2005	Apache Point	A. C. Becker	·	2.0 km	MPC · JPL
360916	2005 SN_{283}	—	September 21, 2005	Apache Point	A. C. Becker	EOS	1.7 km	MPC · JPL
360917	2005 ST_{290}	—	September 25, 2005	Kitt Peak	Spacewatch	·	2.1 km	MPC · JPL
360918	2005 TV_{14}	—	October 3, 2005	Catalina	CSS	·	2.4 km	MPC · JPL
360919	2005 TU_{15}	—	October 1, 2005	Kitt Peak	Spacewatch	·	2.3 km	MPC · JPL
360920	2005 TT_{16}	—	October 1, 2005	Kitt Peak	Spacewatch	EUP	3.5 km	MPC · JPL
360921	2005 TB_{20}	—	October 1, 2005	Mount Lemmon	Mount Lemmon Survey	·	2.0 km	MPC · JPL
360922	2005 TO_{25}	—	October 1, 2005	Mount Lemmon	Mount Lemmon Survey	·	2.2 km	MPC · JPL
360923	2005 TC_{39}	—	October 1, 2005	Catalina	CSS	·	5.0 km	MPC · JPL
360924	2005 TF_{43}	—	October 5, 2005	Kitt Peak	Spacewatch	·	2.5 km	MPC · JPL
360925	2005 TQ_{54}	—	October 1, 2005	Catalina	CSS	·	2.7 km	MPC · JPL
360926	2005 TW_{54}	—	October 4, 2005	Mount Lemmon	Mount Lemmon Survey	·	3.0 km	MPC · JPL
360927	2005 TO_{61}	—	October 3, 2005	Catalina	CSS	EOS	2.1 km	MPC · JPL
360928	2005 TH_{66}	—	October 4, 2005	Mount Lemmon	Mount Lemmon Survey	·	1.9 km	MPC · JPL
360929	2005 TH_{104}	—	October 8, 2005	Socorro	LINEAR	·	3.8 km	MPC · JPL
360930	2005 TV_{109}	—	September 29, 2005	Kitt Peak	Spacewatch	·	2.6 km	MPC · JPL
360931	2005 TJ_{119}	—	October 7, 2005	Kitt Peak	Spacewatch	EOS	1.7 km	MPC · JPL
360932	2005 TJ_{133}	—	October 8, 2005	Kitt Peak	Spacewatch	EOS	1.9 km	MPC · JPL
360933	2005 TX_{135}	—	October 6, 2005	Anderson Mesa	LONEOS	·	2.5 km	MPC · JPL
360934	2005 TN_{150}	—	September 29, 2005	Kitt Peak	Spacewatch	·	2.5 km	MPC · JPL
360935	2005 TN_{151}	—	October 8, 2005	Kitt Peak	Spacewatch	·	2.1 km	MPC · JPL
360936	2005 TZ_{161}	—	October 9, 2005	Kitt Peak	Spacewatch	·	2.3 km	MPC · JPL
360937	2005 TM_{168}	—	October 9, 2005	Kitt Peak	Spacewatch	·	2.5 km	MPC · JPL
360938	2005 TV_{169}	—	October 10, 2005	Kitt Peak	Spacewatch	·	1.7 km	MPC · JPL
360939	2005 TN_{196}	—	October 12, 2005	Kitt Peak	Spacewatch	·	3.0 km	MPC · JPL
360940	2005 TO_{196}	—	October 7, 2005	Mount Lemmon	Mount Lemmon Survey	·	2.5 km	MPC · JPL
360941	2005 UY_{12}	—	October 22, 2005	Kitt Peak	Spacewatch	TRE	2.1 km	MPC · JPL
360942	2005 UF_{17}	—	October 22, 2005	Kitt Peak	Spacewatch	·	3.7 km	MPC · JPL
360943	2005 UX_{35}	—	October 24, 2005	Kitt Peak	Spacewatch	·	1.9 km	MPC · JPL
360944	2005 UA_{38}	—	October 24, 2005	Kitt Peak	Spacewatch	·	3.4 km	MPC · JPL
360945	2005 UV_{38}	—	October 24, 2005	Kitt Peak	Spacewatch	·	2.1 km	MPC · JPL
360946	2005 UK_{39}	—	October 24, 2005	Kitt Peak	Spacewatch	EOS	2.0 km	MPC · JPL
360947	2005 UH_{51}	—	October 23, 2005	Catalina	CSS	·	2.1 km	MPC · JPL
360948	2005 UH_{54}	—	October 23, 2005	Catalina	CSS	·	3.0 km	MPC · JPL
360949	2005 UV_{55}	—	October 23, 2005	Catalina	CSS	·	3.9 km	MPC · JPL
360950	2005 UE_{66}	—	October 22, 2005	Catalina	CSS	·	3.8 km	MPC · JPL
360951	2005 UA_{76}	—	October 3, 2005	Palomar	NEAT	·	4.0 km	MPC · JPL
360952	2005 UE_{82}	—	October 22, 2005	Kitt Peak	Spacewatch	·	2.3 km	MPC · JPL
360953	2005 US_{91}	—	October 22, 2005	Kitt Peak	Spacewatch	EOS	2.1 km	MPC · JPL
360954	2005 UN_{93}	—	October 22, 2005	Kitt Peak	Spacewatch	EOS	1.4 km	MPC · JPL
360955	2005 US_{95}	—	October 22, 2005	Kitt Peak	Spacewatch	·	4.0 km	MPC · JPL
360956	2005 UR_{104}	—	October 22, 2005	Kitt Peak	Spacewatch	BRA	1.7 km	MPC · JPL
360957	2005 UP_{108}	—	October 22, 2005	Kitt Peak	Spacewatch	EOS	2.3 km	MPC · JPL
360958	2005 US_{108}	—	October 22, 2005	Palomar	NEAT	·	3.4 km	MPC · JPL
360959	2005 UR_{109}	—	October 22, 2005	Kitt Peak	Spacewatch	·	3.8 km	MPC · JPL
360960	2005 UY_{115}	—	October 23, 2005	Catalina	CSS	·	1.9 km	MPC · JPL
360961	2005 UK_{124}	—	October 24, 2005	Kitt Peak	Spacewatch	·	3.6 km	MPC · JPL
360962	2005 UF_{129}	—	October 24, 2005	Kitt Peak	Spacewatch	KOR	1.2 km	MPC · JPL
360963	2005 UB_{141}	—	October 25, 2005	Catalina	CSS	·	3.3 km	MPC · JPL
360964	2005 UB_{169}	—	October 24, 2005	Kitt Peak	Spacewatch	·	1.8 km	MPC · JPL
360965	2005 UM_{175}	—	October 24, 2005	Kitt Peak	Spacewatch	·	4.7 km	MPC · JPL
360966	2005 UR_{176}	—	October 24, 2005	Kitt Peak	Spacewatch	·	2.9 km	MPC · JPL
360967	2005 UJ_{183}	—	October 25, 2005	Kitt Peak	Spacewatch	HYG	2.8 km	MPC · JPL
360968	2005 UJ_{197}	—	October 24, 2005	Kitt Peak	Spacewatch	·	2.3 km	MPC · JPL
360969	2005 UB_{209}	—	October 27, 2005	Mount Lemmon	Mount Lemmon Survey	·	2.7 km	MPC · JPL
360970	2005 UV_{211}	—	October 27, 2005	Kitt Peak	Spacewatch	·	2.2 km	MPC · JPL
360971	2005 UP_{212}	—	October 27, 2005	Kitt Peak	Spacewatch	THM	2.6 km	MPC · JPL
360972	2005 UZ_{230}	—	October 25, 2005	Mount Lemmon	Mount Lemmon Survey	THM	2.4 km	MPC · JPL
360973	2005 UV_{235}	—	October 25, 2005	Kitt Peak	Spacewatch	·	2.1 km	MPC · JPL
360974	2005 UE_{249}	—	October 28, 2005	Mount Lemmon	Mount Lemmon Survey	THM	2.3 km	MPC · JPL
360975	2005 UK_{253}	—	October 27, 2005	Kitt Peak	Spacewatch	·	3.9 km	MPC · JPL
360976	2005 UQ_{257}	—	October 25, 2005	Kitt Peak	Spacewatch	·	1.9 km	MPC · JPL
360977	2005 UV_{266}	—	October 27, 2005	Kitt Peak	Spacewatch	THM	2.2 km	MPC · JPL
360978	2005 UK_{270}	—	October 28, 2005	Mount Lemmon	Mount Lemmon Survey	·	1.6 km	MPC · JPL
360979	2005 UM_{277}	—	October 24, 2005	Kitt Peak	Spacewatch	EOS	2.0 km	MPC · JPL
360980	2005 UD_{291}	—	October 26, 2005	Kitt Peak	Spacewatch	EOS	1.9 km	MPC · JPL
360981	2005 UQ_{307}	—	October 27, 2005	Mount Lemmon	Mount Lemmon Survey	·	2.6 km	MPC · JPL
360982	2005 UQ_{308}	—	October 27, 2005	Mount Lemmon	Mount Lemmon Survey	·	2.0 km	MPC · JPL
360983	2005 UC_{320}	—	October 27, 2005	Kitt Peak	Spacewatch	·	1.8 km	MPC · JPL
360984	2005 UT_{325}	—	October 12, 2005	Kitt Peak	Spacewatch	·	1.8 km	MPC · JPL
360985	2005 UJ_{327}	—	October 29, 2005	Kitt Peak	Spacewatch	·	3.2 km	MPC · JPL
360986	2005 UO_{334}	—	October 29, 2005	Mount Lemmon	Mount Lemmon Survey	·	2.2 km	MPC · JPL
360987	2005 UR_{347}	—	October 31, 2005	Kitt Peak	Spacewatch	·	2.3 km	MPC · JPL
360988	2005 UQ_{350}	—	October 29, 2005	Kitt Peak	Spacewatch	·	4.3 km	MPC · JPL
360989	2005 UA_{352}	—	October 29, 2005	Catalina	CSS	EOS	2.5 km	MPC · JPL
360990	2005 UC_{363}	—	October 27, 2005	Mount Lemmon	Mount Lemmon Survey	·	2.0 km	MPC · JPL
360991	2005 UD_{365}	—	October 27, 2005	Kitt Peak	Spacewatch	EOS	2.0 km	MPC · JPL
360992	2005 UZ_{386}	—	October 30, 2005	Mount Lemmon	Mount Lemmon Survey	·	2.8 km	MPC · JPL
360993	2005 UF_{392}	—	October 30, 2005	Kitt Peak	Spacewatch	·	2.3 km	MPC · JPL
360994	2005 UK_{395}	—	October 30, 2005	Mount Lemmon	Mount Lemmon Survey	·	1.8 km	MPC · JPL
360995	2005 UY_{421}	—	October 5, 2005	Kitt Peak	Spacewatch	KOR	1.3 km	MPC · JPL
360996	2005 UX_{424}	—	October 28, 2005	Kitt Peak	Spacewatch	·	1.8 km	MPC · JPL
360997	2005 UM_{441}	—	October 29, 2005	Catalina	CSS	·	2.8 km	MPC · JPL
360998	2005 UD_{454}	—	October 26, 2005	Kitt Peak	Spacewatch	TIR	3.3 km	MPC · JPL
360999	2005 UU_{454}	—	October 28, 2005	Catalina	CSS	·	3.7 km	MPC · JPL
361000	2005 UN_{468}	—	October 30, 2005	Kitt Peak	Spacewatch	·	4.2 km	MPC · JPL

back to top

== See also ==
- Meanings of minor-planet names: 360001–361000
