= Meanings of minor-planet names: 361001–362000 =

As minor planet discoveries are confirmed, they are given a permanent number by the IAU's Minor Planet Center (MPC), and the discoverers can then submit names for them, following the IAU's naming conventions. The list below concerns those minor planets in the specified number-range that have received names, and explains the meanings of those names.

Official naming citations of newly named small Solar System bodies are approved and published in a bulletin by IAU's Working Group for Small Bodies Nomenclature (WGSBN). Before May 2021, citations were published in MPC's Minor Planet Circulars for many decades. Recent citations can also be found on the JPL Small-Body Database (SBDB). Until his death in 2016, German astronomer Lutz D. Schmadel compiled these citations into the Dictionary of Minor Planet Names (DMP) and regularly updated the collection.

Based on Paul Herget's The Names of the Minor Planets, Schmadel also researched the unclear origin of numerous asteroids, most of which had been named prior to World War II. This article incorporates text from this source, which is in the public domain: SBDB New namings may only be added to this list below after official publication as the preannouncement of names is condemned. The WGSBN publishes a comprehensive guideline for the naming rules of non-cometary small Solar System bodies.

== 361001–361100 ==
Named minor planet	Provisional	This minor planet was named for...	Ref · Catalog
There are no named minor planets in this number range

== 361101–361200 ==
back to top

Named minor planet	Provisional	This minor planet was named for...	Ref · Catalog
361183 Tandon	2006 QB_{34}	Barthelemy Tandon (1720–1775), an astronomer of the Montpellier Royal Society of Sciences. He observed the 1761 transit of Venus.	JPL · 361183
361193 Cheungtaklung	2006 QW_{184}	Cheung Tak-Lung (Zhang De-Long in Mandarin, 1946–2019), was a famous Chinese calligrapher from Guangdong province. He devoted his life to the study, practice, education and teaching of traditional Chinese calligraphy. In spite of his renown, Cheung remained a modest artist. Name proposed by Man-To Hui.	JPL · 361193

== 361201–361300 ==
back to top

Named minor planet	Provisional	This minor planet was named for...	Ref · Catalog
361267 ʻIʻiwi	2006 SV_{395}	The ʻiʻiwi is a species of honeycreeper endemic to the Hawaiian islands. It has a curved bill and red and black plumage, and is one of the most distinctive native Hawaiian birds. It is present on most of the islands of Hawaiʻi, but is listed as a threatened species due to habitat loss and disease.	JPL · 361267

== 361301–361400 ==
back to top

Named minor planet	Provisional	This minor planet was named for...	Ref · Catalog
There are no named minor planets in this number range

== 361401–361500 ==
back to top

Named minor planet	Provisional	This minor planet was named for...	Ref · Catalog
361450 Houellebecq	2007 BM_{73}	Michel Houellebecq (born 1958), a French author, filmmaker and poet	JPL · 361450

== 361501–361600 ==
back to top

Named minor planet	Provisional	This minor planet was named for...	Ref · Catalog
361524 Klimka	2007 FN_{35}	Libertas Klimka (born 1940), a Lithuanian historian of science and physicist. Together with G. Kakaras, he organized the Lithuanian Museum of Ethnocosmology with public astronomical observatory in 1990. Klimka is the author of 10 popular books, as well as many popular and scientific publications.	JPL · 361524
361530 Victorfranzhess	2007 HN_{16}	Victor Franz Hess (1883–1964), an Austrian physicist	JPL · 361530

== 361601–361700 ==
back to top

Named minor planet	Provisional	This minor planet was named for...	Ref · Catalog
361690 Laurelanmaurer	2007 VN_{8}	Laurel Ann Maurer (born 1959), a musician and music teacher	JPL · 361690

== 361701–361800 ==
back to top

Named minor planet	Provisional	This minor planet was named for...	Ref · Catalog
361707 Pharmauni	2007 VU_{251}	Pharmauni (China Pharmaceutical University), the first state-established higher education institution dedicated to pharmaceutical sciences in China.	IAU · 361707
361712 Liuhui	2007 VX_{295}	Liu Hui (c. 225–295), one of the most important mathematicians of the ancient world.	IAU · 361712
361764 Antonbuslov	2008 AK_{2}	Anton Buslov (1983–2014), a Russian astrophysicist, urbanist and blogger.	JPL · 361764

== 361801–361900 ==
back to top

Named minor planet	Provisional	This minor planet was named for...	Ref · Catalog
There are no named minor planets in this number range

== 361901–362000 ==
back to top

Named minor planet	Provisional	This minor planet was named for...	Ref · Catalog
There are no named minor planets in this number range

back to top

Preceded by 360,001–361,000	Meanings of minor-planet names List of minor planets: 361,001–362,000	Succeeded by 362,001–363,000
