= Meanings of minor-planet names =

This is a list of minor planets which have been officially named by the Working Group for Small Bodies Nomenclature (WGSBN) of the International Astronomical Union (IAU). The list consists of partial pages, each covering a number range of 1,000 bodies citing the source after each minor planet was named for. An overview of all existing partial pages is given in section § Index.

Among the hundreds of thousands of numbered minor planets only a small fraction have received a name so far. As of 25 May 2026, there are 26,067 named minor planets out of a total of more than 880,000 numbered ones. Most of these bodies are named for people, in particular astronomers, as well as figures from mythology and fiction. Many minor planets are also named after places such cities, towns, and villages, mountains and volcanoes; after rivers, observatories, as well as organizations, clubs and astronomical societies. Some are named after animals and plants. A few minor planets are named after exotic entities such as supercomputers or have an unknown origin.

The first few thousand minor planets have all been named, with the near-Earth asteroid (4596) 1981 QB currently being the lowest-numbered unnamed minor planet. The first 3 pages in the below table contain 1,000 named entries each. The first 13 and 33 pages contain at least 500 and 100 named entries each, respectively. The first range to contain no entries is 373001–374000. There are also several name conflicts with other astronomical objects, mostly with planetary satellites and among themselves.

Following a proposal of the discovering astronomer, new minor planet names are approved and published by IAU's WGSBN several times a year. The WGSBN applies a set of rules for naming minor planets. These range from syntax restrictions to non-offensive meanings. Over the years the rules have changed several times. In the beginning, for example, most minor planets were named after female characters from Greek and Roman mythology.

== Index ==
This is an overview of all existing partial lists on the meanings of minor planets (MoMP). Each table covers 100,000 minor planets, with each cell representing a specific partial list of 1,000 sequentially numbered bodies. Grayed out cells do not yet contain any citations for the corresponding number range. For an introduction, see § top.

=== Meanings from 1 to 100,000 ===
| 1–1000 | 1,001 | 2,001 | 3,001 | 4,001 | 5,001 | 6,001 | 7,001 | 8,001 | 9,001 |
| 10,001 | 11,001 | 12,001 | 13,001 | 14,001 | 15,001 | 16,001 | 17,001 | 18,001 | 19,001 |
| 20,001 | 21,001 | 22,001 | 23,001 | 24,001 | 25,001 | 26,001 | 27,001 | 28,001 | 29,001 |
| 30,001 | 31,001 | 32,001 | 33,001 | 34,001 | 35,001 | 36,001 | 37,001 | 38,001 | 39,001 |
| 40,001 | 41,001 | 42,001 | 43,001 | 44,001 | 45,001 | 46,001 | 47,001 | 48,001 | 49,001 |
| 50,001 | 51,001 | 52,001 | 53,001 | 54,001 | 55,001 | 56,001 | 57,001 | 58,001 | 59,001 |
| 60,001 | 61,001 | 62,001 | 63,001 | 64,001 | 65,001 | 66,001 | 67,001 | 68,001 | 69,001 |
| 70,001 | 71,001 | 72,001 | 73,001 | 74,001 | 75,001 | 76,001 | 77,001 | 78,001 | 79,001 |
| 80,001 | 81,001 | 82,001 | 83,001 | 84,001 | 85,001 | 86,001 | 87,001 | 88,001 | 89,001 |
| 90,001 | 91,001 | 92,001 | 93,001 | 94,001 | 95,001 | 96,001 | 97,001 | 98,001 | 99,001 |

=== Meanings from 100,001 to 200,000 ===
| 100,001 | 101,001 | 102,001 | 103,001 | 104,001 | 105,001 | 106,001 | 107,001 | 108,001 | 109,001 |
| 110,001 | 111,001 | 112,001 | 113,001 | 114,001 | 115,001 | 116,001 | 117,001 | 118,001 | 119,001 |
| 120,001 | 121,001 | 122,001 | 123,001 | 124,001 | 125,001 | 126,001 | 127,001 | 128,001 | 129,001 |
| 130,001 | 131,001 | 132,001 | 133,001 | 134,001 | 135,001 | 136,001 | 137,001 | 138,001 | 139,001 |
| 140,001 | 141,001 | 142,001 | 143,001 | 144,001 | 145,001 | 146,001 | 147,001 | 148,001 | 149,001 |
| 150,001 | 151,001 | 152,001 | 153,001 | 154,001 | 155,001 | 156,001 | 157,001 | 158,001 | 159,001 |
| 160,001 | 161,001 | 162,001 | 163,001 | 164,001 | 165,001 | 166,001 | 167,001 | 168,001 | 169,001 |
| 170,001 | 171,001 | 172,001 | 173,001 | 174,001 | 175,001 | 176,001 | 177,001 | 178,001 | 179,001 |
| 180,001 | 181,001 | 182,001 | 183,001 | 184,001 | 185,001 | 186,001 | 187,001 | 188,001 | 189,001 |
| 190,001 | 191,001 | 192,001 | 193,001 | 194,001 | 195,001 | 196,001 | 197,001 | 198,001 | 199,001 |

=== Meanings from 200,001 to 300,000 ===
| 200,001 | 201,001 | 202,001 | 203,001 | 204,001 | 205,001 | 206,001 | 207,001 | 208,001 | 209,001 |
| 210,001 | 211,001 | 212,001 | 213,001 | 214,001 | 215,001 | 216,001 | 217,001 | 218,001 | 219,001 |
| 220,001 | 221,001 | 222,001 | 223,001 | 224,001 | 225,001 | 226,001 | 227,001 | 228,001 | 229,001 |
| 230,001 | 231,001 | 232,001 | 233,001 | 234,001 | 235,001 | 236,001 | 237,001 | 238,001 | 239,001 |
| 240,001 | 241,001 | 242,001 | 243,001 | 244,001 | 245,001 | 246,001 | 247,001 | 248,001 | 249,001 |
| 250,001 | 251,001 | 252,001 | 253,001 | 254,001 | 255,001 | 256,001 | 257,001 | 258,001 | 259,001 |
| 260,001 | 261,001 | 262,001 | 263,001 | 264,001 | 265,001 | 266,001 | 267,001 | 268,001 | 269,001 |
| 270,001 | 271,001 | 272,001 | 273,001 | 274,001 | 275,001 | 276,001 | 277,001 | 278,001 | 279,001 |
| 280,001 | 281,001 | 282,001 | 283,001 | 284,001 | 285,001 | 286,001 | 287,001 | 288,001 | 289,001 |
| 290,001 | 291,001 | 292,001 | 293,001 | 294,001 | 295,001 | 296,001 | 297,001 | 298,001 | 299,001 |

=== Meanings from 300,001 to 400,000 ===
| 300,001 | 301,001 | 302,001 | 303,001 | 304,001 | 305,001 | 306,001 | 307,001 | 308,001 | 309,001 |
| 310,001 | 311,001 | 312,001 | 313,001 | 314,001 | 315,001 | 316,001 | 317,001 | 318,001 | 319,001 |
| 320,001 | 321,001 | 322,001 | 323,001 | 324,001 | 325,001 | 326,001 | 327,001 | 328,001 | 329,001 |
| 330,001 | 331,001 | 332,001 | 333,001 | 334,001 | 335,001 | 336,001 | 337,001 | 338,001 | 339,001 |
| 340,001 | 341,001 | 342,001 | 343,001 | 344,001 | 345,001 | 346,001 | 347,001 | 348,001 | 349,001 |
| 350,001 | 351,001 | 352,001 | 353,001 | 354,001 | 355,001 | 356,001 | 357,001 | 358,001 | 359,001 |
| 360,001 | 361,001 | 362,001 | 363,001 | 364,001 | 365,001 | 366,001 | 367,001 | 368,001 | 369,001 |
| 370,001 | 371,001 | 372,001 | 373,001 | 374,001 | 375,001 | 376,001 | 377,001 | 378,001 | 379,001 |
| 380,001 | 381,001 | 382,001 | 383,001 | 384,001 | 385,001 | 386,001 | 387,001 | 388,001 | 389,001 |
| 390,001 | 391,001 | 392,001 | 393,001 | 394,001 | 395,001 | 396,001 | 397,001 | 398,001 | 399,001 |

=== Meanings from 400,001 to 500,000 ===
| 400,001 | 401,001 | 402,001 | 403,001 | 404,001 | 405,001 | 406,001 | 407,001 | 408,001 | 409,001 |
| 410,001 | 411,001 | 412,001 | 413,001 | 414,001 | 415,001 | 416,001 | 417,001 | 418,001 | 419,001 |
| 420,001 | 421,001 | 422,001 | 423,001 | 424,001 | 425,001 | 426,001 | 427,001 | 428,001 | 429,001 |
| 430,001 | 431,001 | 432,001 | 433,001 | 434,001 | 435,001 | 436,001 | 437,001 | 438,001 | 439,001 |
| 440,001 | 441,001 | 442,001 | 443,001 | 444,001 | 445,001 | 446,001 | 447,001 | 448,001 | 449,001 |
| 450,001 | 451,001 | 452,001 | 453,001 | 454,001 | 455,001 | 456,001 | 457,001 | 458,001 | 459,001 |
| 460,001 | 461,001 | 462,001 | 463,001 | 464,001 | 465,001 | 466,001 | 467,001 | 468,001 | 469,001 |
| 470,001 | 471,001 | 472,001 | 473,001 | 474,001 | 475,001 | 476,001 | 477,001 | 478,001 | 479,001 |
| 480,001 | 481,001 | 482,001 | 483,001 | 484,001 | 485,001 | 486,001 | 487,001 | 488,001 | 489,001 |
| 490,001 | 491,001 | 492,001 | 493,001 | 494,001 | 495,001 | 496,001 | 497,001 | 498,001 | 499,001 |

=== Meanings from 500,001 to 600,000 ===
| 500,001 | 501,001 | 502,001 | 503,001 | 504,001 | 505,001 | 506,001 | 507,001 | 508,001 | 509,001 |
| 510,001 | 511,001 | 512,001 | 513,001 | 514,001 | 515,001 | 516,001 | 517,001 | 518,001 | 519,001 |
| 520,001 | 521,001 | 522,001 | 523,001 | 524,001 | 525,001 | 526,001 | 527,001 | 528,001 | 529,001 |
| 530,001 | 531,001 | 532,001 | 533,001 | 534,001 | 535,001 | 536,001 | 537,001 | 538,001 | 539,001 |
| 540,001 | 541,001 | 542,001 | 543,001 | 544,001 | 545,001 | 546,001 | 547,001 | 548,001 | 549,001 |
| 550,001 | 551,001 | 552,001 | 553,001 | 554,001 | 555,001 | 556,001 | 557,001 | 558,001 | 559,001 |
| 560,001 | 561,001 | 562,001 | 563,001 | 564,001 | 565,001 | 566,001 | 567,001 | 568,001 | 569,001 |
| 570,001 | 571,001 | 572,001 | 573,001 | 574,001 | 575,001 | 576,001 | 577,001 | 578,001 | 579,001 |
| 580,001 | 581,001 | 582,001 | 583,001 | 584,001 | 585,001 | 586,001 | 587,001 | 588,001 | 589,001 |
| 590,001 | 591,001 | 592,001 | 593,001 | 594,001 | 595,001 | 596,001 | 597,001 | 598,001 | 599,001 |

=== Meanings from 600,001 to 700,000 ===
| 600,001 | 601,001 | 602,001 | 603,001 | 604,001 | 605,001 | 606,001 | 607,001 | 608,001 | 609,001 |
| 610,001 | 611,001 | 612,001 | 613,001 | 614,001 | 615,001 | 616,001 | 617,001 | 618,001 | 619,001 |
| 620,001 | 621,001 | 622,001 | 623,001 | 624,001 | 625,001 | 626,001 | 627,001 | 628,001 | 629,001 |
| 630,001 | 631,001 | 632,001 | 633,001 | 634,001 | 635,001 | 636,001 | 637,001 | 638,001 | 639,001 |
| 640,001 | 641,001 | 642,001 | 643,001 | 644,001 | 645,001 | 646,001 | 647,001 | 648,001 | 649,001 |
| 650,001 | 651,001 | 652,001 | 653,001 | 654,001 | 655,001 | 656,001 | 657,001 | 658,001 | 659,001 |
| 660,001 | 661,001 | 662,001 | 663,001 | 664,001 | 665,001 | 666,001 | 667,001 | 668,001 | 669,001 |
| 670,001 | 671,001 | 672,001 | 673,001 | 674,001 | 675,001 | 676,001 | 677,001 | 678,001 | 679,001 |
| 680,001 | 681,001 | 682,001 | 683,001 | 684,001 | 685,001 | 686,001 | 687,001 | 688,001 | 689,001 |
| 690,001 | 691,001 | 692,001 | 693,001 | 694,001 | 695,001 | 696,001 | 697,001 | 698,001 | 699,001 |

=== Meanings from 700,001 to 800,000 ===
| 700,001 | 701,001 | 702,001 | 703,001 | 704,001 | 705,001 | 706,001 | 707,001 | 708,001 | 709,001 |
| 710,001 | 711,001 | 712,001 | 713,001 | 714,001 | 715,001 | 716,001 | 717,001 | 718,001 | 719,001 |
| 720,001 | 721,001 | 722,001 | 723,001 | 724,001 | 725,001 | 726,001 | 727,001 | 728,001 | 729,001 |
| 730,001 | 731,001 | 732,001 | 733,001 | 734,001 | 735,001 | 736,001 | 737,001 | 738,001 | 739,001 |
| 740,001 | 741,001 | 742,001 | 743,001 | 744,001 | 745,001 | 746,001 | 747,001 | 748,001 | 749,001 |
| 750,001 | 751,001 | 752,001 | 753,001 | 754,001 | 755,001 | 756,001 | 757,001 | 758,001 | 759,001 |
| 760,001 | 761,001 | 762,001 | 763,001 | 764,001 | 765,001 | 766,001 | 767,001 | 768,001 | 769,001 |
| 770,001 | 771,001 | 772,001 | 773,001 | 774,001 | 775,001 | 776,001 | 777,001 | 778,001 | 779,001 |
| 780,001 | 781,001 | 782,001 | 783,001 | 784,001 | 785,001 | 786,001 | 787,001 | 788,001 | 789,001 |
| 790,001 | 791,001 | 792,001 | 793,001 | 794,001 | 795,001 | 796,001 | 797,001 | 798,001 | 799,001 |

=== Meanings from 800,001 to 900,000 ===
| 800,001 | 801,001 | 802,001 | 803,001 | 804,001 | 805,001 | 806,001 | 807,001 | 808,001 | 809,001 |
| 810,001 | 811,001 | 812,001 | 813,001 | 814,001 | 815,001 | 816,001 | 817,001 | 818,001 | 819,001 |
| 820,001 | 821,001 | 822,001 | 823,001 | 824,001 | 825,001 | 826,001 | 827,001 | 828,001 | 829,001 |
| 830,001 | 831,001 | 832,001 | 833,001 | 834,001 | 835,001 | 836,001 | 837,001 | 838,001 | 839,001 |
| 840,001 | 841,001 | 842,001 | 843,001 | 844,001 | 845,001 | 846,001 | 847,001 | 848,001 | 849,001 |
| 850,001 | 851,001 | 852,001 | 853,001 | 854,001 | 855,001 | 856,001 | 857,001 | 858,001 | 859,001 |
| 860,001 | 861,001 | 862,001 | 863,001 | 864,001 | 865,001 | 866,001 | 867,001 | 868,001 | 869,001 |
| 870,001 | 871,001 | 872,001 | 873,001 | 874,001 | 875,001 | 876,001 | 877,001 | 878,001 | 879,001 |
| 880,001 | 881,001 | 882,001 | 883,001 | 884,001 | 885,001 | 886,001 | 887,001 | 888,001 | 889,001 |
| 890,001 | 891,001 | 892,001 | 893,001 | 894,001 | 895,001 | 896,001 | 897,001 | 898,001 | 899,001 |

== See also ==
- List of minor planets
- List of named minor planets (alphabetical)
- Category:Meanings of minor planet names description available (11)
