= List of minor planets: 395001–396000 =

The following is a partial list of minor planets, running from minor-planet number 395001 through 396000, inclusive. The primary data for this and other partial lists is based on JPL's "Small-Body Orbital Elements" and data available from the Minor Planet Center. Critical list information is also provided by the MPC, unless otherwise specified from Lowell Observatory. A detailed description of the table's columns and additional sources are given on the main page including a complete list of every page in this series, and a statistical break-up on the dynamical classification of minor planets.

Also see the summary list of all named bodies in numerical and alphabetical order, and the corresponding naming citations for the number range of this particular list. New namings may only be added to this list after official publication, as the preannouncement of names is condemned by the Working Group for Small Bodies Nomenclature of the International Astronomical Union.

Near-Earth obj.	MBA (inner)	MBA (outer)	Centaur
Mars-crosser	MBA (middle)	Jupiter trojan	Trans-Neptunian obj.
Unclassified

== 395001–395100 ==
Designation			Discovery			Properties		Ref
Permanent	Provisional	Named after	Date	Site	Discoverer(s)	Category	Diam.	Ref
395001	2009 BS_{102}	—	January 30, 2009	Mount Lemmon	Mount Lemmon Survey	·	1.4 km	MPC · JPL
395002	2009 BN_{116}	—	January 29, 2009	Kitt Peak	Spacewatch	·	2.1 km	MPC · JPL
395003	2009 BV_{119}	—	January 30, 2009	Mount Lemmon	Mount Lemmon Survey	·	1.1 km	MPC · JPL
395004	2009 BB_{133}	—	December 22, 2008	Kitt Peak	Spacewatch	·	1.5 km	MPC · JPL
395005	2009 BJ_{134}	—	January 29, 2009	Kitt Peak	Spacewatch	EUN	1.4 km	MPC · JPL
395006	2009 BX_{137}	—	January 29, 2009	Kitt Peak	Spacewatch	·	1.5 km	MPC · JPL
395007	2009 BD_{139}	—	November 7, 2007	Mount Lemmon	Mount Lemmon Survey	·	1.4 km	MPC · JPL
395008	2009 BE_{144}	—	January 30, 2009	Kitt Peak	Spacewatch	·	1.1 km	MPC · JPL
395009	2009 BW_{151}	—	January 1, 2009	Kitt Peak	Spacewatch	WIT	1.1 km	MPC · JPL
395010	2009 BT_{154}	—	January 31, 2009	Kitt Peak	Spacewatch	·	1.1 km	MPC · JPL
395011	2009 BQ_{158}	—	January 31, 2009	Kitt Peak	Spacewatch	·	1.7 km	MPC · JPL
395012	2009 BF_{174}	—	January 25, 2009	Kitt Peak	Spacewatch	·	1.4 km	MPC · JPL
395013	2009 BQ_{178}	—	January 25, 2009	Kitt Peak	Spacewatch	·	1.5 km	MPC · JPL
395014	2009 BW_{185}	—	December 12, 2004	Kitt Peak	Spacewatch	·	2.3 km	MPC · JPL
395015	2009 BU_{187}	—	December 27, 2003	Socorro	LINEAR	·	2.8 km	MPC · JPL
395016	2009 BM_{190}	—	January 25, 2009	Kitt Peak	Spacewatch	·	1.4 km	MPC · JPL
395017	2009 CJ_{2}	—	January 16, 2009	Kitt Peak	Spacewatch	EUN	1.5 km	MPC · JPL
395018	2009 CD_{3}	—	February 2, 2009	Mayhill	Guido, E.	·	1.9 km	MPC · JPL
395019	2009 CR_{3}	—	February 2, 2009	Moletai	K. Černis, Zdanavicius, J.	AEO	1.1 km	MPC · JPL
395020	2009 CY_{9}	—	February 1, 2009	Mount Lemmon	Mount Lemmon Survey	·	2.1 km	MPC · JPL
395021	2009 CA_{23}	—	February 1, 2009	Kitt Peak	Spacewatch	·	1.8 km	MPC · JPL
395022	2009 CK_{32}	—	February 1, 2009	Kitt Peak	Spacewatch	·	1.7 km	MPC · JPL
395023	2009 CO_{32}	—	February 1, 2009	Kitt Peak	Spacewatch	·	1.8 km	MPC · JPL
395024	2009 CQ_{37}	—	February 4, 2009	Mount Lemmon	Mount Lemmon Survey	·	1.2 km	MPC · JPL
395025	2009 CG_{41}	—	February 13, 2009	Kitt Peak	Spacewatch	·	1.4 km	MPC · JPL
395026	2009 CC_{45}	—	January 16, 2009	Kitt Peak	Spacewatch	·	1.4 km	MPC · JPL
395027	2009 CN_{45}	—	February 14, 2009	Kitt Peak	Spacewatch	·	1.4 km	MPC · JPL
395028	2009 CG_{50}	—	February 14, 2009	La Sagra	OAM	·	2.2 km	MPC · JPL
395029	2009 DN_{16}	—	February 17, 2009	La Sagra	OAM	·	1.8 km	MPC · JPL
395030	2009 DY_{19}	—	February 5, 2009	Kitt Peak	Spacewatch	·	1.2 km	MPC · JPL
395031	2009 DE_{26}	—	February 21, 2009	Mount Lemmon	Mount Lemmon Survey	·	1.8 km	MPC · JPL
395032	2009 DZ_{34}	—	January 20, 2009	Mount Lemmon	Mount Lemmon Survey	·	2.0 km	MPC · JPL
395033	2009 DG_{42}	—	January 20, 2009	Kitt Peak	Spacewatch	·	1.4 km	MPC · JPL
395034	2009 DB_{57}	—	February 22, 2009	Kitt Peak	Spacewatch	·	1.6 km	MPC · JPL
395035	2009 DF_{63}	—	February 13, 2009	Kitt Peak	Spacewatch	·	2.6 km	MPC · JPL
395036	2009 DJ_{65}	—	February 22, 2009	Kitt Peak	Spacewatch	·	1.9 km	MPC · JPL
395037	2009 DT_{80}	—	January 19, 2004	Kitt Peak	Spacewatch	AGN	1.0 km	MPC · JPL
395038	2009 DD_{86}	—	February 27, 2009	Kitt Peak	Spacewatch	·	1.7 km	MPC · JPL
395039	2009 DY_{86}	—	February 27, 2009	Kitt Peak	Spacewatch	·	1.7 km	MPC · JPL
395040	2009 DE_{95}	—	February 28, 2009	Kitt Peak	Spacewatch	MRX	960 m	MPC · JPL
395041	2009 DK_{98}	—	February 26, 2009	Kitt Peak	Spacewatch	(13314)	1.7 km	MPC · JPL
395042	2009 DL_{101}	—	February 26, 2009	Kitt Peak	Spacewatch	·	2.0 km	MPC · JPL
395043	2009 DY_{105}	—	September 23, 2006	Kitt Peak	Spacewatch	fast	1.9 km	MPC · JPL
395044	2009 DB_{109}	—	February 24, 2009	Mount Lemmon	Mount Lemmon Survey	·	2.2 km	MPC · JPL
395045	2009 DE_{111}	—	February 5, 2009	Mount Lemmon	Mount Lemmon Survey	·	2.2 km	MPC · JPL
395046	2009 DZ_{111}	—	February 26, 2009	Calar Alto	F. Hormuth	·	1.3 km	MPC · JPL
395047	2009 DE_{116}	—	February 27, 2009	Kitt Peak	Spacewatch	·	1.8 km	MPC · JPL
395048	2009 DE_{130}	—	February 27, 2009	Kitt Peak	Spacewatch	HNS	1.1 km	MPC · JPL
395049	2009 DQ_{138}	—	February 20, 2009	Mount Lemmon	Mount Lemmon Survey	·	2.5 km	MPC · JPL
395050	2009 DK_{139}	—	February 27, 2009	Kitt Peak	Spacewatch	KOR	1.3 km	MPC · JPL
395051	2009 DD_{141}	—	February 19, 2009	Kitt Peak	Spacewatch	WIT	900 m	MPC · JPL
395052	2009 EO_{1}	—	March 2, 2009	Socorro	LINEAR	·	2.0 km	MPC · JPL
395053	2009 ER_{16}	—	March 15, 2009	Kitt Peak	Spacewatch	·	1.8 km	MPC · JPL
395054	2009 ER_{20}	—	March 15, 2009	Kitt Peak	Spacewatch	·	2.1 km	MPC · JPL
395055	2009 EX_{22}	—	March 3, 2009	Mount Lemmon	Mount Lemmon Survey	(12739)	1.7 km	MPC · JPL
395056	2009 FU_{1}	—	March 1, 2009	Kitt Peak	Spacewatch	DOR	2.7 km	MPC · JPL
395057	2009 FK_{3}	—	March 17, 2009	Wildberg	R. Apitzsch	fast	1.8 km	MPC · JPL
395058	2009 FD_{4}	—	February 28, 2009	Mount Lemmon	Mount Lemmon Survey	PAD	1.9 km	MPC · JPL
395059	2009 FD_{8}	—	March 16, 2009	Kitt Peak	Spacewatch	·	1.9 km	MPC · JPL
395060	2009 FR_{11}	—	March 17, 2009	Kitt Peak	Spacewatch	HOF	2.4 km	MPC · JPL
395061	2009 FJ_{23}	—	March 21, 2009	Kitt Peak	Spacewatch	AGN	1.4 km	MPC · JPL
395062	2009 FC_{26}	—	March 16, 2009	Mount Lemmon	Mount Lemmon Survey	·	1.7 km	MPC · JPL
395063	2009 FM_{27}	—	March 21, 2009	Kitt Peak	Spacewatch	·	2.1 km	MPC · JPL
395064	2009 FH_{40}	—	March 1, 2009	Kitt Peak	Spacewatch	·	2.3 km	MPC · JPL
395065	2009 FS_{40}	—	March 17, 2009	Kitt Peak	Spacewatch	·	2.0 km	MPC · JPL
395066	2009 FV_{44}	—	March 22, 2009	Mount Lemmon	Mount Lemmon Survey	·	2.0 km	MPC · JPL
395067	2009 FG_{53}	—	March 29, 2009	Kitt Peak	Spacewatch	·	2.0 km	MPC · JPL
395068	2009 FQ_{75}	—	March 21, 2009	La Sagra	OAM	·	1.9 km	MPC · JPL
395069	2009 GC_{1}	—	April 3, 2009	Cerro Burek	Burek, Cerro	·	3.5 km	MPC · JPL
395070	2009 GO_{1}	—	April 3, 2009	Cerro Burek	Burek, Cerro	·	2.8 km	MPC · JPL
395071	2009 GE_{6}	—	April 2, 2009	Kitt Peak	Spacewatch	·	1.7 km	MPC · JPL
395072	2009 GF_{6}	—	November 25, 2005	Catalina	CSS	·	3.2 km	MPC · JPL
395073	2009 HE_{6}	—	March 29, 2009	Kitt Peak	Spacewatch	·	2.5 km	MPC · JPL
395074	2009 HM_{7}	—	April 17, 2009	Kitt Peak	Spacewatch	·	3.0 km	MPC · JPL
395075	2009 HL_{14}	—	April 17, 2009	Kitt Peak	Spacewatch	·	2.6 km	MPC · JPL
395076	2009 HY_{28}	—	April 19, 2009	Kitt Peak	Spacewatch	·	2.3 km	MPC · JPL
395077	2009 HR_{33}	—	April 19, 2009	Mount Lemmon	Mount Lemmon Survey	·	2.0 km	MPC · JPL
395078	2009 HB_{36}	—	April 20, 2009	Kitt Peak	Spacewatch	H	540 m	MPC · JPL
395079	2009 HJ_{50}	—	April 2, 2009	Mount Lemmon	Mount Lemmon Survey	HOF	2.5 km	MPC · JPL
395080	2009 HK_{58}	—	April 3, 2003	Anderson Mesa	LONEOS	·	3.8 km	MPC · JPL
395081	2009 HG_{79}	—	November 25, 2006	Kitt Peak	Spacewatch	EOS	1.9 km	MPC · JPL
395082	2009 HR_{79}	—	March 21, 2009	Mount Lemmon	Mount Lemmon Survey	HOF	2.6 km	MPC · JPL
395083	2009 HX_{83}	—	April 27, 2009	Kitt Peak	Spacewatch	fast	3.5 km	MPC · JPL
395084	2009 HC_{91}	—	April 22, 2009	La Sagra	OAM	·	2.6 km	MPC · JPL
395085	2009 HA_{93}	—	April 30, 2009	Mount Lemmon	Mount Lemmon Survey	·	2.1 km	MPC · JPL
395086	2009 HM_{97}	—	April 17, 2009	Kitt Peak	Spacewatch	·	3.2 km	MPC · JPL
395087	2009 HR_{99}	—	April 2, 2009	Kitt Peak	Spacewatch	·	1.9 km	MPC · JPL
395088	2009 HT_{100}	—	April 30, 2009	Mount Lemmon	Mount Lemmon Survey	·	2.9 km	MPC · JPL
395089	2009 HH_{101}	—	April 30, 2009	Kitt Peak	Spacewatch	·	5.3 km	MPC · JPL
395090	2009 JZ_{1}	—	May 1, 2009	Kitt Peak	Spacewatch	·	2.0 km	MPC · JPL
395091	2009 KC_{6}	—	May 25, 2009	Kitt Peak	Spacewatch	·	4.3 km	MPC · JPL
395092	2009 KM_{10}	—	April 18, 2009	Mount Lemmon	Mount Lemmon Survey	·	2.4 km	MPC · JPL
395093	2009 KR_{13}	—	May 25, 2009	Kitt Peak	Spacewatch	TIR ·	3.4 km	MPC · JPL
395094	2009 KG_{23}	—	May 27, 2009	Kitt Peak	Spacewatch	·	3.0 km	MPC · JPL
395095	2009 KF_{27}	—	May 30, 2009	Mount Lemmon	Mount Lemmon Survey	·	3.2 km	MPC · JPL
395096	2009 KY_{28}	—	May 31, 2009	Bergisch Gladbach	W. Bickel	·	3.7 km	MPC · JPL
395097	2009 KG_{37}	—	December 10, 2010	Mount Lemmon	Mount Lemmon Survey	H	580 m	MPC · JPL
395098	2009 MY_{3}	—	June 19, 2009	Kitt Peak	Spacewatch	·	2.0 km	MPC · JPL
395099	2009 NK	—	September 11, 2004	Socorro	LINEAR	·	3.9 km	MPC · JPL
395100	2009 OQ_{21}	—	July 26, 2009	Bergisch Gladbach	W. Bickel	·	2.1 km	MPC · JPL

== 395101–395200 ==
back to top

Designation			Discovery			Properties		Ref
Permanent	Provisional	Named after	Date	Site	Discoverer(s)	Category	Diam.	Ref
395101	2009 OT_{21}	—	July 31, 2009	Bergisch Gladbach	W. Bickel	·	2.7 km	MPC · JPL
395102	2009 QV_{57}	—	August 29, 2009	La Sagra	OAM	·	3.8 km	MPC · JPL
395103	2009 RA_{8}	—	September 12, 2009	Kitt Peak	Spacewatch	·	5.0 km	MPC · JPL
395104	2009 RW_{15}	—	September 12, 2009	Kitt Peak	Spacewatch	EOS	2.0 km	MPC · JPL
395105	2009 RK_{64}	—	September 15, 2009	Kitt Peak	Spacewatch	L4	7.7 km	MPC · JPL
395106	2009 SN_{46}	—	September 16, 2009	Kitt Peak	Spacewatch	·	770 m	MPC · JPL
395107	2009 TL	—	October 7, 2009	Siding Spring	SSS	·	3.5 km	MPC · JPL
395108	2009 TB_{1}	—	October 9, 2009	Siding Spring	SSS	·	3.1 km	MPC · JPL
395109	2009 TK_{28}	—	September 15, 2009	Kitt Peak	Spacewatch	H	530 m	MPC · JPL
395110	2009 UX_{148}	—	September 28, 2009	Mount Lemmon	Mount Lemmon Survey	L4	7.1 km	MPC · JPL
395111	2009 VC_{31}	—	November 9, 2009	Mount Lemmon	Mount Lemmon Survey	·	780 m	MPC · JPL
395112	2009 VR_{45}	—	November 10, 1999	Kitt Peak	Spacewatch	·	640 m	MPC · JPL
395113	2009 VB_{50}	—	November 11, 2009	La Sagra	OAM	T_{j} (2.99)	4.8 km	MPC · JPL
395114	2009 VV_{52}	—	April 16, 2004	Kitt Peak	Spacewatch	·	700 m	MPC · JPL
395115	2009 VW_{96}	—	November 8, 2009	Mount Lemmon	Mount Lemmon Survey	L4	6.7 km	MPC · JPL
395116	2009 WJ_{37}	—	November 9, 2009	Mount Lemmon	Mount Lemmon Survey	·	730 m	MPC · JPL
395117	2009 WG_{38}	—	March 13, 2007	Kitt Peak	Spacewatch	·	890 m	MPC · JPL
395118	2009 WO_{73}	—	November 18, 2009	Kitt Peak	Spacewatch	·	570 m	MPC · JPL
395119	2009 WJ_{125}	—	November 8, 2009	Kitt Peak	Spacewatch	·	830 m	MPC · JPL
395120	2009 WY_{214}	—	October 1, 2005	Mount Lemmon	Mount Lemmon Survey	NYS	940 m	MPC · JPL
395121	2009 WE_{258}	—	November 26, 2009	Mount Lemmon	Mount Lemmon Survey	·	1.1 km	MPC · JPL
395122	2009 WJ_{259}	—	November 18, 2009	Mount Lemmon	Mount Lemmon Survey	·	1.0 km	MPC · JPL
395123	2009 XY	—	December 9, 2009	Nazaret	Muler, G.	·	1.2 km	MPC · JPL
395124 Astonepia	2009 XX_{7}	Astonepia	December 10, 2009	San Marcello	L. Tesi, G. Fagioli	·	870 m	MPC · JPL
395125	2009 XD_{13}	—	December 11, 2009	Mount Lemmon	Mount Lemmon Survey	PHO	820 m	MPC · JPL
395126	2009 YF_{11}	—	December 18, 2009	Mount Lemmon	Mount Lemmon Survey	·	1.0 km	MPC · JPL
395127	2009 YR_{13}	—	December 18, 2009	Kitt Peak	Spacewatch	·	1.2 km	MPC · JPL
395128	2009 YV_{20}	—	December 27, 2009	Kitt Peak	Spacewatch	·	580 m	MPC · JPL
395129	2009 YW_{21}	—	June 9, 2007	Kitt Peak	Spacewatch	·	880 m	MPC · JPL
395130	2009 YQ_{22}	—	December 18, 2009	Kitt Peak	Spacewatch	·	800 m	MPC · JPL
395131	2010 AJ_{1}	—	January 5, 2010	Kitt Peak	Spacewatch	·	900 m	MPC · JPL
395132	2010 AS_{15}	—	January 7, 2010	Mount Lemmon	Mount Lemmon Survey	·	790 m	MPC · JPL
395133	2010 AB_{29}	—	April 11, 2007	Kitt Peak	Spacewatch	(2076)	670 m	MPC · JPL
395134	2010 AU_{44}	—	January 7, 2010	Mount Lemmon	Mount Lemmon Survey	·	1.4 km	MPC · JPL
395135	2010 AP_{54}	—	December 1, 2005	Kitt Peak	Spacewatch	·	1.2 km	MPC · JPL
395136	2010 AV_{77}	—	January 7, 2010	Kitt Peak	Spacewatch	·	930 m	MPC · JPL
395137	2010 AR_{80}	—	March 31, 2003	Kitt Peak	Spacewatch	MAS	790 m	MPC · JPL
395138	2010 AQ_{107}	—	January 12, 2010	WISE	WISE	PHO	2.8 km	MPC · JPL
395139	2010 BB_{72}	—	May 1, 2006	Kitt Peak	Spacewatch	·	2.5 km	MPC · JPL
395140	2010 BL_{93}	—	October 30, 2009	Mount Lemmon	Mount Lemmon Survey	L4	10 km	MPC · JPL
395141 Césarmanrique	2010 CC	Césarmanrique	February 4, 2010	Nazaret	G. Muler, J. M. Ruiz	·	880 m	MPC · JPL
395142	2010 CG	—	February 6, 2010	Pla D'Arguines	R. Ferrando	·	1.0 km	MPC · JPL
395143	2010 CN_{1}	—	February 9, 2010	Siding Spring	SSS	APO	640 m	MPC · JPL
395144	2010 CR_{2}	—	February 5, 2010	Kitt Peak	Spacewatch	NYS	940 m	MPC · JPL
395145	2010 CX_{4}	—	January 8, 2010	Kitt Peak	Spacewatch	NYS	880 m	MPC · JPL
395146	2010 CW_{21}	—	February 9, 2010	Mount Lemmon	Mount Lemmon Survey	·	790 m	MPC · JPL
395147	2010 CA_{33}	—	September 3, 2005	Catalina	CSS	·	710 m	MPC · JPL
395148 Kurnin	2010 CL_{36}	Kurnin	February 10, 2010	Zelenchukskaya Stn	T. V. Krjačko	·	1.9 km	MPC · JPL
395149	2010 CX_{44}	—	February 11, 2010	WISE	WISE	·	1.8 km	MPC · JPL
395150	2010 CP_{47}	—	February 12, 2010	WISE	WISE	·	1.6 km	MPC · JPL
395151	2010 CC_{61}	—	May 8, 2007	Anderson Mesa	LONEOS	NYS	1.0 km	MPC · JPL
395152	2010 CD_{66}	—	October 24, 2008	Mount Lemmon	Mount Lemmon Survey	NYS	1.2 km	MPC · JPL
395153	2010 CY_{66}	—	February 10, 2010	Kitt Peak	Spacewatch	·	1.1 km	MPC · JPL
395154	2010 CS_{75}	—	October 26, 2005	Kitt Peak	Spacewatch	·	830 m	MPC · JPL
395155	2010 CE_{87}	—	February 23, 2007	Kitt Peak	Spacewatch	·	730 m	MPC · JPL
395156	2010 CX_{93}	—	February 14, 2010	Catalina	CSS	V	680 m	MPC · JPL
395157	2010 CH_{96}	—	January 11, 2010	Kitt Peak	Spacewatch	NYS	870 m	MPC · JPL
395158	2010 CP_{136}	—	February 15, 2010	WISE	WISE	ADE	2.3 km	MPC · JPL
395159	2010 CF_{157}	—	December 25, 2005	Mount Lemmon	Mount Lemmon Survey	MAS	580 m	MPC · JPL
395160	2010 CP_{160}	—	February 14, 2010	Catalina	CSS	·	1.3 km	MPC · JPL
395161	2010 CM_{168}	—	February 15, 2010	Kitt Peak	Spacewatch	·	2.2 km	MPC · JPL
395162	2010 CG_{172}	—	September 29, 2008	Catalina	CSS	·	950 m	MPC · JPL
395163	2010 CU_{178}	—	February 14, 2010	Kitt Peak	Spacewatch	·	1.2 km	MPC · JPL
395164	2010 CZ_{180}	—	March 6, 1999	Kitt Peak	Spacewatch	·	1.0 km	MPC · JPL
395165	2010 CQ_{181}	—	June 16, 2007	Kitt Peak	Spacewatch	V	620 m	MPC · JPL
395166	2010 CE_{203}	—	November 10, 2009	Mount Lemmon	Mount Lemmon Survey	L4	14 km	MPC · JPL
395167	2010 DN_{35}	—	January 11, 2010	Kitt Peak	Spacewatch	·	1.0 km	MPC · JPL
395168	2010 DO_{42}	—	February 17, 2010	Kitt Peak	Spacewatch	NYS	1.0 km	MPC · JPL
395169	2010 DE_{48}	—	February 17, 2010	Mount Lemmon	Mount Lemmon Survey	·	940 m	MPC · JPL
395170	2010 DK_{49}	—	February 18, 2010	Kitt Peak	Spacewatch	·	1.1 km	MPC · JPL
395171	2010 DW_{55}	—	February 22, 2010	WISE	WISE	·	2.1 km	MPC · JPL
395172	2010 EC_{11}	—	March 3, 2010	WISE	WISE	·	2.5 km	MPC · JPL
395173	2010 EZ_{34}	—	March 10, 2010	Purple Mountain	PMO NEO Survey Program	·	990 m	MPC · JPL
395174	2010 EC_{42}	—	May 7, 2006	Kitt Peak	Spacewatch	EUN	1 km	MPC · JPL
395175	2010 EK_{67}	—	February 1, 2006	Mount Lemmon	Mount Lemmon Survey	·	1.2 km	MPC · JPL
395176	2010 ED_{70}	—	March 10, 2010	La Sagra	OAM	MAS	730 m	MPC · JPL
395177	2010 EN_{82}	—	September 29, 2008	Catalina	CSS	NYS	1.1 km	MPC · JPL
395178	2010 EZ_{82}	—	March 12, 2010	Mount Lemmon	Mount Lemmon Survey	·	2.3 km	MPC · JPL
395179	2010 ED_{85}	—	March 13, 2010	Kitt Peak	Spacewatch	NYS	1 km	MPC · JPL
395180	2010 EM_{100}	—	March 14, 2010	La Sagra	OAM	·	1.2 km	MPC · JPL
395181	2010 EL_{103}	—	March 15, 2010	Mount Lemmon	Mount Lemmon Survey	(5)	1.2 km	MPC · JPL
395182	2010 EP_{111}	—	March 14, 2010	Kitt Peak	Spacewatch	·	1.5 km	MPC · JPL
395183	2010 EV_{111}	—	February 24, 2006	Kitt Peak	Spacewatch	MAS	760 m	MPC · JPL
395184	2010 EE_{137}	—	September 30, 2003	Kitt Peak	Spacewatch	MAR	1.2 km	MPC · JPL
395185	2010 FJ_{5}	—	January 11, 2010	Mount Lemmon	Mount Lemmon Survey	·	640 m	MPC · JPL
395186	2010 FW_{85}	—	March 25, 2010	Kitt Peak	Spacewatch	KON	2.4 km	MPC · JPL
395187	2010 FA_{98}	—	October 20, 1995	Kitt Peak	Spacewatch	·	1.5 km	MPC · JPL
395188	2010 FC_{98}	—	March 12, 2010	Kitt Peak	Spacewatch	·	1.8 km	MPC · JPL
395189	2010 FQ_{101}	—	March 21, 2010	Mount Lemmon	Mount Lemmon Survey	·	1.5 km	MPC · JPL
395190	2010 GJ_{31}	—	September 9, 2007	Kitt Peak	Spacewatch	·	1.3 km	MPC · JPL
395191	2010 GL_{32}	—	April 8, 2010	La Sagra	OAM	PHO	1.6 km	MPC · JPL
395192	2010 GQ_{32}	—	April 8, 2010	Mount Lemmon	Mount Lemmon Survey	·	1.6 km	MPC · JPL
395193	2010 GV_{74}	—	November 19, 2008	Kitt Peak	Spacewatch	V	940 m	MPC · JPL
395194	2010 GZ_{99}	—	April 4, 2010	Kitt Peak	Spacewatch	·	1.9 km	MPC · JPL
395195	2010 GQ_{104}	—	April 2, 2006	Kitt Peak	Spacewatch	·	1.1 km	MPC · JPL
395196	2010 GG_{108}	—	April 8, 2010	Kitt Peak	Spacewatch	·	1.5 km	MPC · JPL
395197	2010 GN_{113}	—	April 10, 2010	Kitt Peak	Spacewatch	·	2.0 km	MPC · JPL
395198	2010 GF_{117}	—	April 10, 2010	Mount Lemmon	Mount Lemmon Survey	·	1.4 km	MPC · JPL
395199	2010 GG_{117}	—	April 10, 2010	Kitt Peak	Spacewatch	·	1.6 km	MPC · JPL
395200	2010 GR_{124}	—	January 16, 2009	Mount Lemmon	Mount Lemmon Survey	·	1.7 km	MPC · JPL

== 395201–395300 ==
back to top

Designation			Discovery			Properties		Ref
Permanent	Provisional	Named after	Date	Site	Discoverer(s)	Category	Diam.	Ref
395201	2010 GW_{127}	—	October 29, 2008	Kitt Peak	Spacewatch	·	1.4 km	MPC · JPL
395202	2010 GK_{133}	—	January 26, 2006	Kitt Peak	Spacewatch	·	1.2 km	MPC · JPL
395203	2010 GQ_{143}	—	April 10, 2010	Mount Lemmon	Mount Lemmon Survey	·	1.3 km	MPC · JPL
395204	2010 GM_{160}	—	March 19, 2010	Mount Lemmon	Mount Lemmon Survey	·	1.4 km	MPC · JPL
395205	2010 HD_{38}	—	April 21, 2010	WISE	WISE	·	4.8 km	MPC · JPL
395206	2010 HV_{56}	—	April 25, 2010	WISE	WISE	·	3.4 km	MPC · JPL
395207	2010 HQ_{80}	—	April 25, 2010	WISE	WISE	APO · PHA	720 m	MPC · JPL
395208	2010 JR_{17}	—	May 3, 2010	WISE	WISE	·	2.6 km	MPC · JPL
395209	2010 JS_{19}	—	May 3, 2010	WISE	WISE	·	2.5 km	MPC · JPL
395210	2010 JR_{33}	—	May 3, 2010	Kitt Peak	Spacewatch	·	1.7 km	MPC · JPL
395211	2010 JJ_{35}	—	September 13, 2007	Kitt Peak	Spacewatch	·	1.5 km	MPC · JPL
395212	2010 JM_{68}	—	May 9, 2010	WISE	WISE	TIN	1.7 km	MPC · JPL
395213	2010 JP_{76}	—	May 6, 2010	Kitt Peak	Spacewatch	EUN	1.5 km	MPC · JPL
395214	2010 JA_{77}	—	May 4, 2006	Kitt Peak	Spacewatch	·	1.3 km	MPC · JPL
395215	2010 JB_{84}	—	November 8, 2007	Kitt Peak	Spacewatch	·	1.6 km	MPC · JPL
395216	2010 JO_{89}	—	May 9, 2010	WISE	WISE	·	1.8 km	MPC · JPL
395217	2010 JR_{176}	—	May 13, 2010	Nogales	Tenagra II	RAF	1.1 km	MPC · JPL
395218	2010 JO_{177}	—	September 11, 2004	Kitt Peak	Spacewatch	V	780 m	MPC · JPL
395219	2010 KN_{9}	—	October 11, 2007	Kitt Peak	Spacewatch	(194)	1.8 km	MPC · JPL
395220	2010 KK_{110}	—	May 29, 2010	WISE	WISE	·	3.9 km	MPC · JPL
395221	2010 KC_{116}	—	May 2, 2009	Mount Lemmon	Mount Lemmon Survey	ELF	3.5 km	MPC · JPL
395222	2010 LE_{53}	—	June 8, 2010	WISE	WISE	VER	3.0 km	MPC · JPL
395223	2010 LF_{61}	—	May 19, 2010	Catalina	CSS	·	1.7 km	MPC · JPL
395224	2010 LT_{79}	—	June 10, 2010	WISE	WISE	·	3.2 km	MPC · JPL
395225	2010 LV_{98}	—	June 13, 2010	WISE	WISE	·	3.6 km	MPC · JPL
395226	2010 LS_{106}	—	December 5, 2008	Mount Lemmon	Mount Lemmon Survey	BRA	1.8 km	MPC · JPL
395227	2010 LQ_{109}	—	May 19, 2010	Mount Lemmon	Mount Lemmon Survey	·	1.2 km	MPC · JPL
395228	2010 MW_{19}	—	June 18, 2010	WISE	WISE	·	4.7 km	MPC · JPL
395229	2010 MN_{26}	—	September 25, 2005	Kitt Peak	Spacewatch	·	2.5 km	MPC · JPL
395230	2010 MD_{27}	—	June 19, 2010	WISE	WISE	·	3.3 km	MPC · JPL
395231 Léonscott	2010 MA_{57}	Léonscott	November 25, 2005	Catalina	CSS	VER	3.5 km	MPC · JPL
395232	2010 MB_{65}	—	June 24, 2010	WISE	WISE	·	2.5 km	MPC · JPL
395233	2010 MX_{67}	—	June 25, 2010	WISE	WISE	·	4.5 km	MPC · JPL
395234	2010 MU_{72}	—	June 25, 2010	WISE	WISE	·	4.1 km	MPC · JPL
395235	2010 MP_{79}	—	October 29, 2005	Catalina	CSS	·	2.4 km	MPC · JPL
395236	2010 MF_{100}	—	February 7, 2008	Mount Lemmon	Mount Lemmon Survey	·	2.4 km	MPC · JPL
395237	2010 MH_{104}	—	March 27, 2008	Mount Lemmon	Mount Lemmon Survey	·	2.6 km	MPC · JPL
395238	2010 NN_{36}	—	January 17, 2007	Kitt Peak	Spacewatch	·	4.1 km	MPC · JPL
395239	2010 NX_{36}	—	October 4, 1999	Catalina	CSS	·	3.8 km	MPC · JPL
395240	2010 ND_{59}	—	February 9, 2008	Kitt Peak	Spacewatch	·	3.3 km	MPC · JPL
395241	2010 NB_{65}	—	July 11, 2010	WISE	WISE	·	3.5 km	MPC · JPL
395242	2010 NG_{70}	—	August 22, 2004	Kitt Peak	Spacewatch	·	3.4 km	MPC · JPL
395243	2010 NC_{74}	—	December 1, 2005	Mount Lemmon	Mount Lemmon Survey	·	2.5 km	MPC · JPL
395244	2010 NM_{83}	—	June 17, 2004	Siding Spring	SSS	·	5.1 km	MPC · JPL
395245	2010 NL_{113}	—	July 13, 2010	WISE	WISE	HYG	2.9 km	MPC · JPL
395246	2010 OJ_{6}	—	February 9, 2008	Kitt Peak	Spacewatch	·	3.3 km	MPC · JPL
395247	2010 OF_{12}	—	July 17, 2010	WISE	WISE	EUP	3.5 km	MPC · JPL
395248	2010 ON_{24}	—	May 26, 2009	Catalina	CSS	·	2.2 km	MPC · JPL
395249	2010 OD_{27}	—	July 19, 2010	WISE	WISE	·	4.0 km	MPC · JPL
395250	2010 OS_{86}	—	July 27, 2010	WISE	WISE	·	3.0 km	MPC · JPL
395251	2010 ON_{96}	—	June 15, 2009	XuYi	PMO NEO Survey Program	·	5.8 km	MPC · JPL
395252	2010 OJ_{118}	—	April 24, 2003	Kitt Peak	Spacewatch	·	3.1 km	MPC · JPL
395253	2010 OF_{127}	—	October 23, 1995	Kitt Peak	Spacewatch	EOS	2.0 km	MPC · JPL
395254	2010 PL_{16}	—	May 26, 2009	Kitt Peak	Spacewatch	·	1.8 km	MPC · JPL
395255	2010 PO_{60}	—	February 9, 2008	Mount Lemmon	Mount Lemmon Survey	·	1.7 km	MPC · JPL
395256	2010 PW_{61}	—	February 8, 2008	Mount Lemmon	Mount Lemmon Survey	·	2.4 km	MPC · JPL
395257	2010 PJ_{77}	—	August 14, 2010	Kitt Peak	Spacewatch	·	2.1 km	MPC · JPL
395258	2010 QP_{1}	—	October 29, 2005	Mount Lemmon	Mount Lemmon Survey	·	4.9 km	MPC · JPL
395259	2010 QJ_{5}	—	August 11, 2004	Socorro	LINEAR	·	3.1 km	MPC · JPL
395260	2010 QA_{6}	—	August 17, 2010	Črni Vrh	Matičič, S.	·	2.0 km	MPC · JPL
395261	2010 RR_{50}	—	October 28, 2005	Mount Lemmon	Mount Lemmon Survey	·	2.6 km	MPC · JPL
395262	2010 RA_{85}	—	August 12, 2010	Kitt Peak	Spacewatch	·	3.3 km	MPC · JPL
395263	2010 RT_{101}	—	September 10, 2010	Kitt Peak	Spacewatch	·	2.2 km	MPC · JPL
395264	2010 RA_{111}	—	October 27, 2005	Mount Lemmon	Mount Lemmon Survey	THM	2.1 km	MPC · JPL
395265	2010 RZ_{142}	—	September 30, 2005	Mount Lemmon	Mount Lemmon Survey	·	2.4 km	MPC · JPL
395266	2010 SU_{1}	—	September 16, 2010	Mount Lemmon	Mount Lemmon Survey	·	3.6 km	MPC · JPL
395267	2010 SC_{2}	—	December 1, 2000	Kitt Peak	Spacewatch	EOS	2.5 km	MPC · JPL
395268	2010 SH_{18}	—	October 1, 2005	Kitt Peak	Spacewatch	·	2.7 km	MPC · JPL
395269	2010 TE_{57}	—	November 25, 2005	Mount Lemmon	Mount Lemmon Survey	·	3.0 km	MPC · JPL
395270	2010 TU_{82}	—	January 30, 2008	Mount Lemmon	Mount Lemmon Survey	·	3.0 km	MPC · JPL
395271	2010 TJ_{84}	—	October 11, 2005	Kitt Peak	Spacewatch	·	2.0 km	MPC · JPL
395272	2010 TH_{97}	—	October 25, 2005	Kitt Peak	Spacewatch	·	2.4 km	MPC · JPL
395273	2010 TB_{130}	—	February 22, 2007	Kitt Peak	Spacewatch	·	3.6 km	MPC · JPL
395274	2010 TF_{164}	—	October 13, 2005	Kitt Peak	Spacewatch	H	340 m	MPC · JPL
395275	2010 TO_{175}	—	May 28, 1998	Kitt Peak	Spacewatch	·	2.8 km	MPC · JPL
395276	2010 UM_{75}	—	August 7, 2010	WISE	WISE	·	3.9 km	MPC · JPL
395277	2010 VZ_{37}	—	December 9, 1999	Kitt Peak	Spacewatch	·	3.8 km	MPC · JPL
395278	2010 VW_{38}	—	April 4, 2008	Kitt Peak	Spacewatch	·	2.9 km	MPC · JPL
395279	2010 VC_{39}	—	September 30, 1999	Socorro	LINEAR	·	2.6 km	MPC · JPL
395280	2010 VA_{66}	—	September 17, 2004	Kitt Peak	Spacewatch	·	3.0 km	MPC · JPL
395281	2010 VM_{89}	—	September 21, 2009	Catalina	CSS	L4	8.8 km	MPC · JPL
395282	2010 VR_{103}	—	October 27, 2003	Kitt Peak	Spacewatch	ULA · CYB	5.3 km	MPC · JPL
395283	2010 VS_{171}	—	October 14, 2010	Mount Lemmon	Mount Lemmon Survey	·	4.0 km	MPC · JPL
395284	2010 XG_{69}	—	December 30, 2005	Kitt Peak	Spacewatch	·	3.2 km	MPC · JPL
395285	2010 XL_{87}	—	May 14, 2004	Kitt Peak	Spacewatch	L4	10 km	MPC · JPL
395286	2011 AH_{69}	—	September 18, 2009	Catalina	CSS	·	2.0 km	MPC · JPL
395287	2011 AV_{73}	—	March 12, 2008	Kitt Peak	Spacewatch	·	670 m	MPC · JPL
395288	2011 AV_{75}	—	November 12, 2005	Kitt Peak	Spacewatch	H	650 m	MPC · JPL
395289	2011 BJ_{2}	—	January 16, 2011	Mount Lemmon	Mount Lemmon Survey	APO +1km	800 m	MPC · JPL
395290	2011 BZ_{65}	—	August 15, 2004	Siding Spring	SSS	H	730 m	MPC · JPL
395291	2011 CK_{2}	—	March 5, 2006	Catalina	CSS	H	740 m	MPC · JPL
395292	2011 DD_{19}	—	February 22, 2011	Kitt Peak	Spacewatch	H	630 m	MPC · JPL
395293	2011 EA_{12}	—	January 7, 2000	Socorro	LINEAR	H	850 m	MPC · JPL
395294	2011 FN_{23}	—	March 27, 2011	Kitt Peak	Spacewatch	·	940 m	MPC · JPL
395295	2011 FJ_{47}	—	September 18, 2003	Kitt Peak	Spacewatch	·	1 km	MPC · JPL
395296	2011 GS_{71}	—	April 5, 2011	Catalina	CSS	H	590 m	MPC · JPL
395297	2011 HA_{54}	—	October 29, 2001	Palomar Mountain	NEAT	CYB	6.6 km	MPC · JPL
395298	2011 HG_{55}	—	November 9, 2009	Kitt Peak	Spacewatch	·	730 m	MPC · JPL
395299	2011 HR_{59}	—	December 11, 2009	Mount Lemmon	Mount Lemmon Survey	V	710 m	MPC · JPL
395300	2011 KW_{31}	—	January 26, 2007	Kitt Peak	Spacewatch	·	740 m	MPC · JPL

== 395301–395400 ==
back to top

Designation			Discovery			Properties		Ref
Permanent	Provisional	Named after	Date	Site	Discoverer(s)	Category	Diam.	Ref
395301	2011 LT	—	August 31, 2005	Kitt Peak	Spacewatch	·	790 m	MPC · JPL
395302	2011 LG_{26}	—	August 30, 2005	Kitt Peak	Spacewatch	·	610 m	MPC · JPL
395303	2011 MW_{7}	—	October 28, 2008	Kitt Peak	Spacewatch	·	1.2 km	MPC · JPL
395304	2011 MO_{8}	—	February 16, 2010	Mount Lemmon	Mount Lemmon Survey	·	850 m	MPC · JPL
395305	2011 NB	—	February 24, 2006	Mount Lemmon	Mount Lemmon Survey	·	1.5 km	MPC · JPL
395306	2011 NH_{1}	—	October 28, 2008	Kitt Peak	Spacewatch	·	650 m	MPC · JPL
395307	2011 OZ	—	November 1, 2005	Kitt Peak	Spacewatch	·	660 m	MPC · JPL
395308	2011 OT_{1}	—	April 12, 1999	Kitt Peak	Spacewatch	·	1.3 km	MPC · JPL
395309	2011 OB_{5}	—	March 17, 2007	Anderson Mesa	LONEOS	·	1.0 km	MPC · JPL
395310	2011 OX_{6}	—	September 23, 2008	Kitt Peak	Spacewatch	·	1.1 km	MPC · JPL
395311	2011 OU_{11}	—	June 22, 2004	Campo Imperatore	CINEOS	·	950 m	MPC · JPL
395312	2011 OY_{14}	—	July 8, 2004	Siding Spring	SSS	·	910 m	MPC · JPL
395313	2011 OK_{16}	—	January 23, 2006	Kitt Peak	Spacewatch	·	1.7 km	MPC · JPL
395314	2011 OB_{20}	—	September 25, 2000	Haleakala	NEAT	·	1.3 km	MPC · JPL
395315	2011 ON_{20}	—	July 1, 2011	Mount Lemmon	Mount Lemmon Survey	·	730 m	MPC · JPL
395316	2011 OP_{20}	—	November 30, 2008	Kitt Peak	Spacewatch	MAS	770 m	MPC · JPL
395317	2011 OL_{24}	—	October 15, 2004	Mount Lemmon	Mount Lemmon Survey	·	900 m	MPC · JPL
395318	2011 OT_{24}	—	April 14, 2007	Mount Lemmon	Mount Lemmon Survey	·	680 m	MPC · JPL
395319	2011 OA_{29}	—	May 9, 2007	Kitt Peak	Spacewatch	·	1.2 km	MPC · JPL
395320	2011 OB_{33}	—	December 25, 2005	Kitt Peak	Spacewatch	·	1.3 km	MPC · JPL
395321	2011 OW_{33}	—	September 25, 1995	Kitt Peak	Spacewatch	·	630 m	MPC · JPL
395322	2011 OR_{56}	—	November 10, 2004	Kitt Peak	Spacewatch	·	1.1 km	MPC · JPL
395323	2011 OA_{57}	—	September 8, 1996	Kitt Peak	Spacewatch	·	1.7 km	MPC · JPL
395324	2011 PZ_{12}	—	October 24, 2000	Socorro	LINEAR	MAS	910 m	MPC · JPL
395325	2011 QZ_{2}	—	August 20, 2011	Pla D'Arguines	R. Ferrando, M. Ferrando	·	1.5 km	MPC · JPL
395326	2011 QB_{6}	—	October 19, 2007	Catalina	CSS	·	1.6 km	MPC · JPL
395327	2011 QN_{8}	—	August 1, 2011	Siding Spring	SSS	·	1.1 km	MPC · JPL
395328	2011 QP_{14}	—	September 3, 2000	Kitt Peak	Spacewatch	NYS	1.2 km	MPC · JPL
395329	2011 QR_{14}	—	August 22, 2004	Kitt Peak	Spacewatch	·	780 m	MPC · JPL
395330	2011 QQ_{16}	—	June 14, 2010	WISE	WISE	·	2.2 km	MPC · JPL
395331	2011 QD_{18}	—	August 26, 2000	Socorro	LINEAR	·	1.5 km	MPC · JPL
395332	2011 QY_{23}	—	December 4, 1996	Kitt Peak	Spacewatch	·	1.7 km	MPC · JPL
395333	2011 QR_{26}	—	August 4, 2011	Siding Spring	SSS	NYS	1.4 km	MPC · JPL
395334	2011 QC_{29}	—	September 24, 2000	Socorro	LINEAR	MAS	770 m	MPC · JPL
395335	2011 QL_{29}	—	June 17, 2007	Kitt Peak	Spacewatch	·	970 m	MPC · JPL
395336	2011 QG_{31}	—	October 10, 2008	Mount Lemmon	Mount Lemmon Survey	·	1.0 km	MPC · JPL
395337	2011 QD_{32}	—	March 14, 2010	Mount Lemmon	Mount Lemmon Survey	NYS	1.2 km	MPC · JPL
395338	2011 QQ_{33}	—	August 29, 2000	Socorro	LINEAR	·	1.1 km	MPC · JPL
395339	2011 QS_{33}	—	July 11, 2004	Socorro	LINEAR	·	650 m	MPC · JPL
395340	2011 QV_{34}	—	March 15, 2010	Mount Lemmon	Mount Lemmon Survey	·	1.5 km	MPC · JPL
395341	2011 QG_{38}	—	March 17, 2005	Kitt Peak	Spacewatch	EUN	1.3 km	MPC · JPL
395342	2011 QH_{40}	—	September 10, 2004	Kitt Peak	Spacewatch	·	750 m	MPC · JPL
395343	2011 QJ_{48}	—	March 24, 2003	Kitt Peak	Spacewatch	NYS	1.0 km	MPC · JPL
395344	2011 QA_{49}	—	April 25, 2003	Kitt Peak	Spacewatch	V	680 m	MPC · JPL
395345	2011 QL_{50}	—	March 12, 2007	Mount Lemmon	Mount Lemmon Survey	·	850 m	MPC · JPL
395346	2011 QS_{50}	—	August 7, 2004	Campo Imperatore	CINEOS	·	750 m	MPC · JPL
395347	2011 QX_{53}	—	July 29, 2000	Anderson Mesa	LONEOS	ERI	2.9 km	MPC · JPL
395348	2011 QZ_{56}	—	December 30, 2008	Kitt Peak	Spacewatch	NYS	1.0 km	MPC · JPL
395349	2011 QH_{57}	—	March 15, 2010	Mount Lemmon	Mount Lemmon Survey	·	1.2 km	MPC · JPL
395350	2011 QV_{57}	—	December 16, 2000	Kitt Peak	Spacewatch	·	1.5 km	MPC · JPL
395351	2011 QV_{64}	—	September 10, 2007	Catalina	CSS	·	1.5 km	MPC · JPL
395352	2011 QT_{66}	—	April 14, 2010	Kitt Peak	Spacewatch	(2076)	910 m	MPC · JPL
395353	2011 QM_{70}	—	December 11, 2004	Kitt Peak	Spacewatch	·	1.6 km	MPC · JPL
395354	2011 QV_{71}	—	May 25, 2007	Mount Lemmon	Mount Lemmon Survey	NYS	1.3 km	MPC · JPL
395355	2011 QO_{77}	—	April 12, 2005	Mount Lemmon	Mount Lemmon Survey	HOF	2.7 km	MPC · JPL
395356	2011 QW_{84}	—	October 5, 2004	Kitt Peak	Spacewatch	·	1.0 km	MPC · JPL
395357	2011 QZ_{91}	—	October 9, 2002	Socorro	LINEAR	DOR	2.2 km	MPC · JPL
395358	2011 QD_{95}	—	May 25, 2003	Kitt Peak	Spacewatch	MAS	1.1 km	MPC · JPL
395359	2011 QF_{97}	—	March 1, 2008	Kitt Peak	Spacewatch	·	3.5 km	MPC · JPL
395360	2011 QS_{97}	—	April 24, 2003	Kitt Peak	Spacewatch	·	1.4 km	MPC · JPL
395361	2011 RN_{4}	—	October 23, 2006	Kitt Peak	Spacewatch	·	3.2 km	MPC · JPL
395362	2011 RP_{5}	—	September 17, 2006	Kitt Peak	Spacewatch	·	2.0 km	MPC · JPL
395363	2011 RK_{9}	—	September 24, 2000	Socorro	LINEAR	TIR	3.4 km	MPC · JPL
395364	2011 RM_{9}	—	September 11, 2007	Catalina	CSS	·	2.1 km	MPC · JPL
395365	2011 RN_{11}	—	August 8, 2004	Socorro	LINEAR	·	730 m	MPC · JPL
395366	2011 RY_{11}	—	June 23, 2007	Kitt Peak	Spacewatch	NYS	1.2 km	MPC · JPL
395367	2011 RH_{13}	—	November 28, 2000	Kitt Peak	Spacewatch	·	1.2 km	MPC · JPL
395368	2011 RJ_{14}	—	March 11, 2005	Mount Lemmon	Mount Lemmon Survey	·	1.7 km	MPC · JPL
395369	2011 RY_{18}	—	March 18, 2010	Mount Lemmon	Mount Lemmon Survey	·	1.2 km	MPC · JPL
395370	2011 SA_{27}	—	September 26, 1998	Socorro	LINEAR	·	3.3 km	MPC · JPL
395371	2011 SD_{27}	—	November 4, 2004	Catalina	CSS	·	1.0 km	MPC · JPL
395372	2011 SS_{29}	—	March 5, 2006	Kitt Peak	Spacewatch	·	2.4 km	MPC · JPL
395373	2011 SP_{30}	—	February 22, 2009	Siding Spring	SSS	BRA	2.3 km	MPC · JPL
395374	2011 SJ_{32}	—	September 22, 2011	Kitt Peak	Spacewatch	AGN	1.2 km	MPC · JPL
395375	2011 ST_{32}	—	August 9, 2007	Socorro	LINEAR	MAS	880 m	MPC · JPL
395376	2011 SF_{34}	—	October 20, 1998	Anderson Mesa	LONEOS	·	1.5 km	MPC · JPL
395377	2011 SD_{43}	—	September 13, 2007	Mount Lemmon	Mount Lemmon Survey	·	1.2 km	MPC · JPL
395378	2011 SN_{43}	—	March 5, 2008	Mount Lemmon	Mount Lemmon Survey	HYG	2.1 km	MPC · JPL
395379	2011 SJ_{44}	—	July 25, 2006	Mount Lemmon	Mount Lemmon Survey	·	2.1 km	MPC · JPL
395380	2011 SL_{44}	—	July 21, 2006	Mount Lemmon	Mount Lemmon Survey	NAE	2.4 km	MPC · JPL
395381	2011 SQ_{45}	—	October 14, 2007	Mount Lemmon	Mount Lemmon Survey	·	1.9 km	MPC · JPL
395382	2011 SB_{51}	—	July 1, 2011	Mount Lemmon	Mount Lemmon Survey	MAS	770 m	MPC · JPL
395383	2011 SL_{53}	—	August 24, 2007	Kitt Peak	Spacewatch	MAS	710 m	MPC · JPL
395384	2011 SY_{53}	—	September 8, 2007	Mount Lemmon	Mount Lemmon Survey	·	1.1 km	MPC · JPL
395385	2011 SZ_{53}	—	October 15, 2004	Mount Lemmon	Mount Lemmon Survey	MAS	810 m	MPC · JPL
395386	2011 SB_{54}	—	February 26, 2009	Kitt Peak	Spacewatch	·	2.1 km	MPC · JPL
395387	2011 SZ_{59}	—	October 20, 2007	Mount Lemmon	Mount Lemmon Survey	·	1.9 km	MPC · JPL
395388	2011 SF_{67}	—	September 24, 1960	Palomar	C. J. van Houten, I. van Houten-Groeneveld, T. Gehrels	·	2.2 km	MPC · JPL
395389	2011 SK_{70}	—	January 16, 2004	Kitt Peak	Spacewatch	·	1.6 km	MPC · JPL
395390	2011 SX_{74}	—	October 15, 2004	Kitt Peak	Spacewatch	·	2.3 km	MPC · JPL
395391	2011 SP_{86}	—	November 13, 2007	Kitt Peak	Spacewatch	NEM	2.3 km	MPC · JPL
395392	2011 SX_{86}	—	November 1, 2000	Kitt Peak	Spacewatch	·	1.2 km	MPC · JPL
395393	2011 SO_{89}	—	September 22, 2011	Kitt Peak	Spacewatch	·	3.4 km	MPC · JPL
395394	2011 SL_{91}	—	November 5, 2007	Kitt Peak	Spacewatch	·	1.3 km	MPC · JPL
395395	2011 ST_{102}	—	August 22, 2004	Siding Spring	SSS	·	800 m	MPC · JPL
395396	2011 SD_{103}	—	July 19, 2007	Siding Spring	SSS	·	1.5 km	MPC · JPL
395397	2011 SJ_{107}	—	October 21, 2006	Mount Lemmon	Mount Lemmon Survey	·	2.6 km	MPC · JPL
395398	2011 SV_{109}	—	November 4, 2007	Kitt Peak	Spacewatch	·	1.5 km	MPC · JPL
395399	2011 SO_{112}	—	November 17, 2004	Campo Imperatore	CINEOS	·	1.1 km	MPC · JPL
395400	2011 SA_{118}	—	February 21, 2009	Kitt Peak	Spacewatch	·	2.3 km	MPC · JPL

== 395401–395500 ==
back to top

Designation			Discovery			Properties		Ref
Permanent	Provisional	Named after	Date	Site	Discoverer(s)	Category	Diam.	Ref
395401	2011 SU_{118}	—	October 16, 2006	Catalina	CSS	·	2.3 km	MPC · JPL
395402	2011 SP_{121}	—	September 12, 1994	Kitt Peak	Spacewatch	·	580 m	MPC · JPL
395403	2011 SG_{123}	—	October 19, 2007	Anderson Mesa	LONEOS	(194)	2.0 km	MPC · JPL
395404	2011 SW_{126}	—	March 16, 2005	Catalina	CSS	EUN	1.2 km	MPC · JPL
395405	2011 SF_{132}	—	December 12, 2004	Kitt Peak	Spacewatch	·	1.2 km	MPC · JPL
395406	2011 SU_{133}	—	September 23, 2000	Kitt Peak	Spacewatch	·	1.0 km	MPC · JPL
395407	2011 SG_{138}	—	September 12, 2001	Kitt Peak	Spacewatch	·	760 m	MPC · JPL
395408	2011 SF_{140}	—	March 1, 2009	Kitt Peak	Spacewatch	·	2.5 km	MPC · JPL
395409	2011 SC_{149}	—	February 1, 2009	Kitt Peak	Spacewatch	·	1.4 km	MPC · JPL
395410	2011 SA_{158}	—	March 21, 2009	Kitt Peak	Spacewatch	WIT	1.2 km	MPC · JPL
395411	2011 SU_{159}	—	September 30, 2006	Mount Lemmon	Mount Lemmon Survey	·	3.7 km	MPC · JPL
395412	2011 SC_{163}	—	September 23, 2011	Kitt Peak	Spacewatch	·	1.7 km	MPC · JPL
395413	2011 SE_{163}	—	September 23, 2011	Kitt Peak	Spacewatch	·	2.0 km	MPC · JPL
395414	2011 SP_{166}	—	September 26, 2011	Mount Lemmon	Mount Lemmon Survey	KOR	1.3 km	MPC · JPL
395415	2011 SU_{170}	—	September 28, 2011	Mount Lemmon	Mount Lemmon Survey	·	2.7 km	MPC · JPL
395416	2011 SA_{172}	—	February 20, 2009	Kitt Peak	Spacewatch	·	1.8 km	MPC · JPL
395417	2011 SD_{174}	—	June 20, 2007	Kitt Peak	Spacewatch	MAS	760 m	MPC · JPL
395418	2011 SM_{179}	—	October 1, 2000	Socorro	LINEAR	·	1.1 km	MPC · JPL
395419	2011 SA_{183}	—	March 16, 2004	Kitt Peak	Spacewatch	·	2.2 km	MPC · JPL
395420	2011 SB_{185}	—	November 25, 2006	Mount Lemmon	Mount Lemmon Survey	·	2.0 km	MPC · JPL
395421	2011 SH_{185}	—	February 4, 2009	Kitt Peak	Spacewatch	(5)	1.4 km	MPC · JPL
395422	2011 ST_{185}	—	September 18, 2011	Mount Lemmon	Mount Lemmon Survey	·	3.2 km	MPC · JPL
395423	2011 SY_{187}	—	November 9, 2007	Kitt Peak	Spacewatch	·	2.4 km	MPC · JPL
395424	2011 SA_{191}	—	May 11, 2005	Catalina	CSS	PAL	2.5 km	MPC · JPL
395425	2011 SS_{191}	—	February 16, 2009	Kitt Peak	Spacewatch	NAE	2.4 km	MPC · JPL
395426	2011 SL_{195}	—	October 4, 2007	Mount Lemmon	Mount Lemmon Survey	·	1.3 km	MPC · JPL
395427	2011 SA_{197}	—	October 10, 2007	Mount Lemmon	Mount Lemmon Survey	·	1.2 km	MPC · JPL
395428	2011 SE_{205}	—	September 20, 2011	Kitt Peak	Spacewatch	·	1.6 km	MPC · JPL
395429	2011 SJ_{209}	—	March 10, 2005	Mount Lemmon	Mount Lemmon Survey	·	2.0 km	MPC · JPL
395430	2011 SU_{209}	—	January 29, 2009	Mount Lemmon	Mount Lemmon Survey	·	2.0 km	MPC · JPL
395431	2011 SH_{211}	—	March 11, 2008	Kitt Peak	Spacewatch	·	3.1 km	MPC · JPL
395432	2011 SS_{212}	—	August 28, 2011	Siding Spring	SSS	·	1.2 km	MPC · JPL
395433	2011 SV_{212}	—	December 22, 2008	Mount Lemmon	Mount Lemmon Survey	·	1.3 km	MPC · JPL
395434	2011 SY_{214}	—	September 8, 2011	Kitt Peak	Spacewatch	·	1.6 km	MPC · JPL
395435	2011 SP_{215}	—	October 2, 2000	Kitt Peak	Spacewatch	NYS	960 m	MPC · JPL
395436	2011 SX_{216}	—	October 9, 2004	Kitt Peak	Spacewatch	·	1.1 km	MPC · JPL
395437	2011 ST_{218}	—	October 17, 2007	Anderson Mesa	LONEOS	·	1.3 km	MPC · JPL
395438	2011 SR_{224}	—	August 21, 2006	Kitt Peak	Spacewatch	AGN	1.2 km	MPC · JPL
395439	2011 SO_{226}	—	September 29, 2011	Mount Lemmon	Mount Lemmon Survey	WIT	1.1 km	MPC · JPL
395440	2011 SS_{226}	—	September 22, 2011	Kitt Peak	Spacewatch	EOS	1.7 km	MPC · JPL
395441	2011 SG_{229}	—	November 19, 2006	Kitt Peak	Spacewatch	EOS	2.0 km	MPC · JPL
395442	2011 SC_{250}	—	September 8, 2011	Kitt Peak	Spacewatch	·	2.1 km	MPC · JPL
395443	2011 SF_{250}	—	September 28, 2011	Mount Lemmon	Mount Lemmon Survey	MAS	660 m	MPC · JPL
395444	2011 SN_{250}	—	October 7, 2004	Socorro	LINEAR	·	1.0 km	MPC · JPL
395445	2011 SC_{253}	—	September 8, 2011	Kitt Peak	Spacewatch	·	1.4 km	MPC · JPL
395446	2011 SE_{254}	—	October 15, 2007	Kitt Peak	Spacewatch	·	1.9 km	MPC · JPL
395447	2011 SC_{256}	—	October 6, 2007	Kitt Peak	Spacewatch	·	1.0 km	MPC · JPL
395448	2011 SD_{258}	—	September 24, 2000	Socorro	LINEAR	·	1.2 km	MPC · JPL
395449	2011 SL_{259}	—	March 8, 2005	Mount Lemmon	Mount Lemmon Survey	·	1.7 km	MPC · JPL
395450	2011 SL_{260}	—	June 1, 2005	Kitt Peak	Spacewatch	·	2.3 km	MPC · JPL
395451	2011 SJ_{261}	—	January 15, 2008	Kitt Peak	Spacewatch	KOR	1.4 km	MPC · JPL
395452	2011 SM_{261}	—	November 19, 2007	Kitt Peak	Spacewatch	·	1.8 km	MPC · JPL
395453	2011 SC_{265}	—	April 12, 2005	Mount Lemmon	Mount Lemmon Survey	·	1.8 km	MPC · JPL
395454	2011 SW_{268}	—	March 26, 2009	Kitt Peak	Spacewatch	EOS	2.1 km	MPC · JPL
395455	2011 SE_{272}	—	October 11, 2004	Kitt Peak	Spacewatch	NYS	1.2 km	MPC · JPL
395456	2011 SY_{272}	—	October 4, 2004	Kitt Peak	Spacewatch	·	880 m	MPC · JPL
395457	2011 SP_{273}	—	September 19, 2006	Anderson Mesa	LONEOS	NAE	2.7 km	MPC · JPL
395458	2011 SA_{274}	—	August 13, 2007	Anderson Mesa	LONEOS	PHO	3.1 km	MPC · JPL
395459	2011 SO_{274}	—	August 16, 2007	XuYi	PMO NEO Survey Program	·	1.5 km	MPC · JPL
395460	2011 SZ_{274}	—	August 10, 2007	Kitt Peak	Spacewatch	MAS	580 m	MPC · JPL
395461	2011 TT	—	September 14, 2007	Kitt Peak	Spacewatch	·	1.4 km	MPC · JPL
395462	2011 TG_{5}	—	November 17, 2006	Kitt Peak	Spacewatch	EOS	2.1 km	MPC · JPL
395463	2011 TP_{7}	—	December 15, 2007	Kitt Peak	Spacewatch	AGN	1.5 km	MPC · JPL
395464	2011 TB_{13}	—	September 4, 2007	Catalina	CSS	·	1.3 km	MPC · JPL
395465	2011 TQ_{13}	—	September 20, 2011	Kitt Peak	Spacewatch	AGN	1.3 km	MPC · JPL
395466	2011 US_{1}	—	February 28, 2008	Kitt Peak	Spacewatch	·	3.1 km	MPC · JPL
395467	2011 UX_{9}	—	April 30, 2006	Kitt Peak	Spacewatch	·	960 m	MPC · JPL
395468	2011 UH_{13}	—	February 20, 2009	Kitt Peak	Spacewatch	·	1.5 km	MPC · JPL
395469	2011 UY_{16}	—	September 19, 2006	Kitt Peak	Spacewatch	AGN	1.1 km	MPC · JPL
395470	2011 UD_{17}	—	November 23, 2006	Kitt Peak	Spacewatch	EOS	1.9 km	MPC · JPL
395471	2011 UB_{26}	—	October 6, 2000	Kitt Peak	Spacewatch	·	1.4 km	MPC · JPL
395472	2011 UK_{27}	—	February 8, 2008	Kitt Peak	Spacewatch	·	2.9 km	MPC · JPL
395473	2011 UN_{29}	—	November 2, 2006	Mount Lemmon	Mount Lemmon Survey	EOS	2.0 km	MPC · JPL
395474	2011 UG_{33}	—	March 27, 1995	Kitt Peak	Spacewatch	·	2.1 km	MPC · JPL
395475	2011 UH_{33}	—	August 28, 2006	Catalina	CSS	AGN	1.3 km	MPC · JPL
395476	2011 UW_{35}	—	March 1, 2010	WISE	WISE	·	3.5 km	MPC · JPL
395477	2011 UJ_{36}	—	April 30, 2009	Kitt Peak	Spacewatch	·	3.0 km	MPC · JPL
395478	2011 UO_{41}	—	February 24, 2009	Kitt Peak	Spacewatch	·	1.9 km	MPC · JPL
395479	2011 UP_{48}	—	November 3, 2007	Kitt Peak	Spacewatch	·	810 m	MPC · JPL
395480	2011 UD_{49}	—	October 12, 2006	Kitt Peak	Spacewatch	EOS	1.6 km	MPC · JPL
395481	2011 UW_{50}	—	October 1, 2005	Catalina	CSS	·	2.9 km	MPC · JPL
395482	2011 UM_{51}	—	May 9, 2006	Mount Lemmon	Mount Lemmon Survey	·	960 m	MPC · JPL
395483	2011 UH_{55}	—	September 24, 2005	Kitt Peak	Spacewatch	·	2.7 km	MPC · JPL
395484	2011 UW_{55}	—	October 18, 2011	Kitt Peak	Spacewatch	·	3.7 km	MPC · JPL
395485	2011 UX_{55}	—	November 20, 2006	Kitt Peak	Spacewatch	EOS	2.3 km	MPC · JPL
395486	2011 UJ_{64}	—	October 18, 2011	XuYi	PMO NEO Survey Program	·	2.2 km	MPC · JPL
395487	2011 UR_{72}	—	December 18, 2003	Socorro	LINEAR	·	1.3 km	MPC · JPL
395488	2011 UX_{73}	—	May 31, 2006	Mount Lemmon	Mount Lemmon Survey	·	1.0 km	MPC · JPL
395489	2011 US_{79}	—	October 9, 1993	Kitt Peak	Spacewatch	NEM	1.9 km	MPC · JPL
395490	2011 US_{80}	—	May 28, 2009	Mount Lemmon	Mount Lemmon Survey	·	3.0 km	MPC · JPL
395491	2011 UP_{81}	—	November 4, 2010	Mount Lemmon	Mount Lemmon Survey	EOS	2.7 km	MPC · JPL
395492	2011 UX_{86}	—	September 4, 2010	Mount Lemmon	Mount Lemmon Survey	·	2.9 km	MPC · JPL
395493	2011 UC_{87}	—	September 20, 2011	Kitt Peak	Spacewatch	·	2.9 km	MPC · JPL
395494	2011 US_{87}	—	November 4, 2005	Mount Lemmon	Mount Lemmon Survey	·	3.8 km	MPC · JPL
395495	2011 UE_{89}	—	October 21, 2011	Mount Lemmon	Mount Lemmon Survey	EOS	2.3 km	MPC · JPL
395496	2011 UL_{89}	—	October 30, 2005	Catalina	CSS	·	5.3 km	MPC · JPL
395497	2011 UV_{89}	—	November 16, 2006	Kitt Peak	Spacewatch	EOS	1.9 km	MPC · JPL
395498	2011 UX_{90}	—	October 8, 2007	Catalina	CSS	·	1.6 km	MPC · JPL
395499	2011 UJ_{93}	—	September 15, 2006	Kitt Peak	Spacewatch	KOR	1.3 km	MPC · JPL
395500	2011 UZ_{94}	—	September 26, 2006	Mount Lemmon	Mount Lemmon Survey	EOS	1.9 km	MPC · JPL

== 395501–395600 ==
back to top

Designation			Discovery			Properties		Ref
Permanent	Provisional	Named after	Date	Site	Discoverer(s)	Category	Diam.	Ref
395501	2011 UX_{96}	—	October 22, 2006	Kitt Peak	Spacewatch	EOS	1.6 km	MPC · JPL
395502	2011 UX_{99}	—	October 20, 2011	Kitt Peak	Spacewatch	·	2.4 km	MPC · JPL
395503	2011 UQ_{102}	—	May 19, 2010	WISE	WISE	·	3.3 km	MPC · JPL
395504	2011 US_{102}	—	October 20, 2011	Kitt Peak	Spacewatch	·	2.9 km	MPC · JPL
395505	2011 UF_{114}	—	December 20, 2001	Kitt Peak	Spacewatch	·	1.8 km	MPC · JPL
395506	2011 UM_{114}	—	November 23, 1997	Kitt Peak	Spacewatch	MRX	1.1 km	MPC · JPL
395507	2011 US_{118}	—	September 25, 2006	Kitt Peak	Spacewatch	KOR	1.2 km	MPC · JPL
395508	2011 UM_{120}	—	September 21, 2011	Kitt Peak	Spacewatch	·	2.1 km	MPC · JPL
395509	2011 UL_{121}	—	August 13, 2007	XuYi	PMO NEO Survey Program	·	1.4 km	MPC · JPL
395510	2011 UJ_{123}	—	November 8, 2007	Kitt Peak	Spacewatch	·	1.5 km	MPC · JPL
395511	2011 UX_{123}	—	October 8, 2007	Mount Lemmon	Mount Lemmon Survey	·	1.7 km	MPC · JPL
395512	2011 UY_{123}	—	September 26, 2011	Kitt Peak	Spacewatch	AGN	1.1 km	MPC · JPL
395513	2011 UZ_{124}	—	May 1, 2006	Kitt Peak	Spacewatch	·	950 m	MPC · JPL
395514	2011 UM_{126}	—	February 24, 2009	Kitt Peak	Spacewatch	·	2.0 km	MPC · JPL
395515	2011 UN_{128}	—	August 16, 2007	XuYi	PMO NEO Survey Program	·	1.9 km	MPC · JPL
395516	2011 UC_{129}	—	October 20, 2011	Kitt Peak	Spacewatch	·	2.2 km	MPC · JPL
395517	2011 UJ_{133}	—	July 5, 2010	Mount Lemmon	Mount Lemmon Survey	·	2.3 km	MPC · JPL
395518	2011 UR_{133}	—	September 20, 2011	Mount Lemmon	Mount Lemmon Survey	·	1.8 km	MPC · JPL
395519	2011 UY_{133}	—	November 8, 2007	Mount Lemmon	Mount Lemmon Survey	·	2.1 km	MPC · JPL
395520	2011 UJ_{134}	—	May 16, 2010	WISE	WISE	EOS	2.8 km	MPC · JPL
395521	2011 UA_{136}	—	November 11, 2002	Kitt Peak	Spacewatch	·	1.9 km	MPC · JPL
395522	2011 UB_{136}	—	March 6, 2008	Mount Lemmon	Mount Lemmon Survey	VER	2.7 km	MPC · JPL
395523	2011 UP_{136}	—	September 29, 2005	Kitt Peak	Spacewatch	VER	2.7 km	MPC · JPL
395524	2011 UY_{137}	—	May 28, 2009	Mount Lemmon	Mount Lemmon Survey	·	2.3 km	MPC · JPL
395525	2011 UF_{139}	—	November 17, 2006	Kitt Peak	Spacewatch	·	1.9 km	MPC · JPL
395526	2011 UZ_{139}	—	October 3, 2000	Prescott	P. G. Comba	·	2.8 km	MPC · JPL
395527	2011 UY_{141}	—	October 15, 2007	Mount Lemmon	Mount Lemmon Survey	AGN	1.4 km	MPC · JPL
395528	2011 UW_{142}	—	September 25, 2006	Anderson Mesa	LONEOS	NEM	2.8 km	MPC · JPL
395529	2011 UC_{143}	—	October 27, 2005	Mount Lemmon	Mount Lemmon Survey	·	2.9 km	MPC · JPL
395530	2011 UE_{146}	—	April 20, 1993	Kitt Peak	Spacewatch	·	2.6 km	MPC · JPL
395531	2011 UE_{148}	—	November 12, 2006	Mount Lemmon	Mount Lemmon Survey	·	2.3 km	MPC · JPL
395532	2011 UW_{148}	—	April 26, 2003	Kitt Peak	Spacewatch	·	3.8 km	MPC · JPL
395533	2011 UU_{149}	—	October 18, 2011	Kitt Peak	Spacewatch	EOS	1.8 km	MPC · JPL
395534	2011 UW_{154}	—	November 19, 2006	Kitt Peak	Spacewatch	·	2.0 km	MPC · JPL
395535	2011 UM_{155}	—	October 3, 2000	Socorro	LINEAR	·	2.9 km	MPC · JPL
395536	2011 UB_{157}	—	December 5, 2007	Mount Lemmon	Mount Lemmon Survey	·	1.2 km	MPC · JPL
395537	2011 UB_{158}	—	April 19, 2009	Mount Lemmon	Mount Lemmon Survey	·	3.2 km	MPC · JPL
395538	2011 UZ_{158}	—	November 19, 2007	Mount Lemmon	Mount Lemmon Survey	·	2.2 km	MPC · JPL
395539	2011 UO_{160}	—	May 15, 2005	Mount Lemmon	Mount Lemmon Survey	·	2.4 km	MPC · JPL
395540	2011 UC_{161}	—	May 23, 2010	WISE	WISE	·	3.8 km	MPC · JPL
395541	2011 UK_{161}	—	March 3, 2008	Mount Lemmon	Mount Lemmon Survey	EOS	2.3 km	MPC · JPL
395542	2011 UV_{167}	—	May 7, 2010	Mount Lemmon	Mount Lemmon Survey	·	1.1 km	MPC · JPL
395543	2011 UG_{168}	—	March 13, 2010	Kitt Peak	Spacewatch	·	1.2 km	MPC · JPL
395544	2011 UJ_{170}	—	October 5, 1996	Kitt Peak	Spacewatch	·	2.0 km	MPC · JPL
395545	2011 UX_{172}	—	December 20, 2007	Mount Lemmon	Mount Lemmon Survey	·	2.0 km	MPC · JPL
395546	2011 UR_{177}	—	May 1, 2009	Mount Lemmon	Mount Lemmon Survey	·	2.8 km	MPC · JPL
395547	2011 UE_{178}	—	April 24, 2006	Kitt Peak	Spacewatch	·	2.1 km	MPC · JPL
395548	2011 UT_{181}	—	September 15, 2006	Kitt Peak	Spacewatch	AGN	1.2 km	MPC · JPL
395549	2011 UD_{185}	—	March 1, 2009	Kitt Peak	Spacewatch	·	2.1 km	MPC · JPL
395550	2011 UE_{188}	—	March 16, 2005	Mount Lemmon	Mount Lemmon Survey	·	2.2 km	MPC · JPL
395551	2011 UQ_{191}	—	October 1, 2011	Kitt Peak	Spacewatch	·	4.3 km	MPC · JPL
395552	2011 UF_{193}	—	October 4, 2002	Socorro	LINEAR	·	1.9 km	MPC · JPL
395553	2011 UC_{194}	—	November 14, 2006	Mount Lemmon	Mount Lemmon Survey	·	3.7 km	MPC · JPL
395554	2011 UK_{195}	—	January 13, 2004	Kitt Peak	Spacewatch	(5)	1.7 km	MPC · JPL
395555	2011 UT_{196}	—	September 29, 2011	Mount Lemmon	Mount Lemmon Survey	·	2.5 km	MPC · JPL
395556	2011 UT_{198}	—	October 25, 2011	Kitt Peak	Spacewatch	·	2.8 km	MPC · JPL
395557	2011 UH_{205}	—	October 20, 2004	Catalina	CSS	·	930 m	MPC · JPL
395558	2011 UW_{205}	—	December 29, 2008	Mount Lemmon	Mount Lemmon Survey	·	1.6 km	MPC · JPL
395559	2011 UO_{210}	—	August 29, 2006	Kitt Peak	Spacewatch	PAD	1.4 km	MPC · JPL
395560	2011 UU_{210}	—	October 21, 2006	Kitt Peak	Spacewatch	EOS	1.6 km	MPC · JPL
395561	2011 UC_{211}	—	August 28, 2006	Kitt Peak	Spacewatch	·	2.1 km	MPC · JPL
395562	2011 UF_{216}	—	September 23, 2011	Kitt Peak	Spacewatch	·	1.9 km	MPC · JPL
395563	2011 UT_{219}	—	March 22, 2009	Catalina	CSS	·	2.2 km	MPC · JPL
395564	2011 UJ_{222}	—	March 10, 2005	Mount Lemmon	Mount Lemmon Survey	·	1.8 km	MPC · JPL
395565	2011 UH_{226}	—	March 6, 2008	Mount Lemmon	Mount Lemmon Survey	·	2.6 km	MPC · JPL
395566	2011 UZ_{232}	—	March 29, 2009	Kitt Peak	Spacewatch	AST	1.6 km	MPC · JPL
395567	2011 US_{243}	—	October 22, 2011	Kitt Peak	Spacewatch	EOS	2.5 km	MPC · JPL
395568	2011 UQ_{244}	—	September 28, 2011	Mount Lemmon	Mount Lemmon Survey	·	3.8 km	MPC · JPL
395569	2011 UZ_{244}	—	June 27, 2005	Kitt Peak	Spacewatch	·	2.1 km	MPC · JPL
395570	2011 UE_{247}	—	September 24, 2006	Anderson Mesa	LONEOS	·	3.0 km	MPC · JPL
395571	2011 UW_{248}	—	September 24, 2011	Mount Lemmon	Mount Lemmon Survey	·	3.3 km	MPC · JPL
395572	2011 UO_{250}	—	April 21, 2009	Kitt Peak	Spacewatch	·	2.7 km	MPC · JPL
395573	2011 UT_{250}	—	December 5, 2007	Kitt Peak	Spacewatch	GEF	1.5 km	MPC · JPL
395574	2011 UV_{250}	—	September 26, 2006	Catalina	CSS	·	2.1 km	MPC · JPL
395575	2011 UP_{251}	—	May 2, 2003	Kitt Peak	Spacewatch	·	4.3 km	MPC · JPL
395576	2011 UV_{251}	—	October 29, 2000	Kitt Peak	Spacewatch	·	3.0 km	MPC · JPL
395577	2011 UH_{255}	—	May 20, 2010	WISE	WISE	·	4.9 km	MPC · JPL
395578	2011 UF_{259}	—	November 10, 2006	Kitt Peak	Spacewatch	EOS	2.6 km	MPC · JPL
395579	2011 UU_{259}	—	October 28, 2005	Mount Lemmon	Mount Lemmon Survey	·	3.2 km	MPC · JPL
395580	2011 UX_{259}	—	November 10, 2006	Kitt Peak	Spacewatch	·	1.6 km	MPC · JPL
395581	2011 UY_{260}	—	September 24, 2011	Mount Lemmon	Mount Lemmon Survey	TEL	1.6 km	MPC · JPL
395582	2011 UR_{267}	—	September 24, 1998	Anderson Mesa	LONEOS	·	2.1 km	MPC · JPL
395583	2011 UR_{270}	—	December 14, 2006	Kitt Peak	Spacewatch	·	3.5 km	MPC · JPL
395584	2011 UR_{282}	—	May 19, 2010	WISE	WISE	ARM	4.1 km	MPC · JPL
395585	2011 UT_{282}	—	September 15, 2006	Kitt Peak	Spacewatch	AGN	1.1 km	MPC · JPL
395586	2011 UL_{284}	—	March 22, 2001	Kitt Peak	Spacewatch	·	2.2 km	MPC · JPL
395587	2011 UP_{284}	—	November 5, 2007	Kitt Peak	Spacewatch	KON	2.5 km	MPC · JPL
395588	2011 UR_{292}	—	September 24, 2007	Kitt Peak	Spacewatch	·	1.1 km	MPC · JPL
395589	2011 UT_{298}	—	September 29, 2011	Mount Lemmon	Mount Lemmon Survey	·	2.3 km	MPC · JPL
395590	2011 UR_{299}	—	November 8, 2007	Kitt Peak	Spacewatch	·	920 m	MPC · JPL
395591	2011 UB_{306}	—	November 7, 2007	Mount Lemmon	Mount Lemmon Survey	BRA	1.7 km	MPC · JPL
395592	2011 UT_{314}	—	September 28, 2006	Kitt Peak	Spacewatch	AGN	1.4 km	MPC · JPL
395593	2011 UW_{315}	—	November 1, 2006	Mount Lemmon	Mount Lemmon Survey	NAE	1.8 km	MPC · JPL
395594	2011 UK_{317}	—	September 18, 2006	Kitt Peak	Spacewatch	·	2.0 km	MPC · JPL
395595	2011 UF_{320}	—	May 15, 2005	Mount Lemmon	Mount Lemmon Survey	·	1.8 km	MPC · JPL
395596	2011 UU_{322}	—	October 25, 2000	Socorro	LINEAR	·	3.5 km	MPC · JPL
395597	2011 UT_{323}	—	June 8, 2005	Kitt Peak	Spacewatch	·	1.8 km	MPC · JPL
395598	2011 US_{324}	—	October 8, 2007	Kitt Peak	Spacewatch	·	1.6 km	MPC · JPL
395599	2011 UH_{325}	—	August 19, 2006	Kitt Peak	Spacewatch	·	1.6 km	MPC · JPL
395600	2011 UW_{325}	—	March 29, 2008	Catalina	CSS	·	3.3 km	MPC · JPL

== 395601–395700 ==
back to top

Designation			Discovery			Properties		Ref
Permanent	Provisional	Named after	Date	Site	Discoverer(s)	Category	Diam.	Ref
395601	2011 UU_{326}	—	October 17, 2006	Kitt Peak	Spacewatch	EOS	1.6 km	MPC · JPL
395602	2011 UZ_{326}	—	December 15, 2006	Kitt Peak	Spacewatch	·	2.7 km	MPC · JPL
395603	2011 UG_{327}	—	February 2, 2008	Kitt Peak	Spacewatch	·	2.1 km	MPC · JPL
395604	2011 UD_{328}	—	November 16, 1998	Kitt Peak	Spacewatch	·	1.8 km	MPC · JPL
395605	2011 UV_{329}	—	August 19, 2006	Kitt Peak	Spacewatch	·	1.5 km	MPC · JPL
395606	2011 UB_{338}	—	September 26, 2011	Kitt Peak	Spacewatch	VER	2.8 km	MPC · JPL
395607	2011 UT_{349}	—	September 27, 2000	Kitt Peak	Spacewatch	EOS	1.9 km	MPC · JPL
395608	2011 UM_{358}	—	December 12, 2004	Kitt Peak	Spacewatch	PHO	1.1 km	MPC · JPL
395609	2011 UA_{359}	—	October 1, 2011	Mount Lemmon	Mount Lemmon Survey	EOS	2.3 km	MPC · JPL
395610	2011 UH_{362}	—	May 24, 2010	WISE	WISE	·	3.3 km	MPC · JPL
395611	2011 UA_{363}	—	August 27, 2006	Kitt Peak	Spacewatch	·	2.1 km	MPC · JPL
395612	2011 UR_{363}	—	November 19, 2007	Mount Lemmon	Mount Lemmon Survey	·	1.9 km	MPC · JPL
395613	2011 UD_{369}	—	May 25, 2010	WISE	WISE	·	3.4 km	MPC · JPL
395614	2011 UW_{373}	—	August 19, 2006	Kitt Peak	Spacewatch	WIT	900 m	MPC · JPL
395615	2011 UW_{378}	—	February 6, 2008	Catalina	CSS	·	2.2 km	MPC · JPL
395616	2011 UJ_{379}	—	April 27, 2009	Mount Lemmon	Mount Lemmon Survey	EOS	2.0 km	MPC · JPL
395617	2011 UV_{379}	—	April 29, 2009	Mount Lemmon	Mount Lemmon Survey	EOS	2.3 km	MPC · JPL
395618	2011 UW_{383}	—	February 29, 2008	Mount Lemmon	Mount Lemmon Survey	·	1.9 km	MPC · JPL
395619	2011 UO_{384}	—	October 4, 1994	Kitt Peak	Spacewatch	·	2.5 km	MPC · JPL
395620	2011 UC_{387}	—	March 3, 2008	Catalina	CSS	·	3.8 km	MPC · JPL
395621	2011 UE_{387}	—	April 30, 2009	Mount Lemmon	Mount Lemmon Survey	·	3.6 km	MPC · JPL
395622	2011 UL_{388}	—	December 13, 2006	Kitt Peak	Spacewatch	HYG	2.9 km	MPC · JPL
395623	2011 UQ_{390}	—	July 4, 2005	Mount Lemmon	Mount Lemmon Survey	·	1.5 km	MPC · JPL
395624	2011 UZ_{390}	—	December 9, 2006	Kitt Peak	Spacewatch	·	5.7 km	MPC · JPL
395625	2011 UH_{392}	—	April 4, 2003	Kitt Peak	Spacewatch	·	830 m	MPC · JPL
395626	2011 UU_{393}	—	March 18, 2005	Catalina	CSS	·	1.9 km	MPC · JPL
395627	2011 UB_{402}	—	September 9, 2007	Mount Lemmon	Mount Lemmon Survey	·	1.4 km	MPC · JPL
395628	2011 VG_{1}	—	January 20, 2008	Kitt Peak	Spacewatch	·	2.7 km	MPC · JPL
395629	2011 VZ_{11}	—	May 24, 2010	WISE	WISE	·	3.8 km	MPC · JPL
395630	2011 VM_{12}	—	October 7, 2005	Mount Lemmon	Mount Lemmon Survey	EOS	1.8 km	MPC · JPL
395631	2011 VL_{14}	—	May 7, 2010	Mount Lemmon	Mount Lemmon Survey	ADE	2.5 km	MPC · JPL
395632	2011 VY_{17}	—	May 3, 2005	Kitt Peak	Spacewatch	·	1.8 km	MPC · JPL
395633	2011 VM_{20}	—	November 15, 1995	Kitt Peak	Spacewatch	·	2.3 km	MPC · JPL
395634	2011 WY_{11}	—	May 11, 2010	WISE	WISE	·	3.2 km	MPC · JPL
395635	2011 WC_{12}	—	November 14, 1995	Kitt Peak	Spacewatch	·	2.2 km	MPC · JPL
395636	2011 WJ_{13}	—	August 28, 2006	Siding Spring	SSS	·	2.7 km	MPC · JPL
395637	2011 WS_{22}	—	February 28, 2008	Mount Lemmon	Mount Lemmon Survey	·	2.6 km	MPC · JPL
395638	2011 WU_{24}	—	September 30, 2006	Mount Lemmon	Mount Lemmon Survey	·	1.9 km	MPC · JPL
395639	2011 WG_{26}	—	January 30, 2008	Mount Lemmon	Mount Lemmon Survey	·	1.8 km	MPC · JPL
395640	2011 WT_{29}	—	October 21, 2006	Kitt Peak	Spacewatch	KOR	1.4 km	MPC · JPL
395641	2011 WT_{30}	—	April 17, 2005	Kitt Peak	Spacewatch	·	1.9 km	MPC · JPL
395642	2011 WE_{33}	—	January 8, 2002	Kitt Peak	Spacewatch	·	2.2 km	MPC · JPL
395643	2011 WY_{33}	—	November 16, 2006	Kitt Peak	Spacewatch	EOS	1.8 km	MPC · JPL
395644	2011 WC_{36}	—	March 12, 2002	Kitt Peak	Spacewatch	THM	2.5 km	MPC · JPL
395645	2011 WF_{36}	—	October 24, 2000	Socorro	LINEAR	TIR	3.2 km	MPC · JPL
395646	2011 WR_{37}	—	November 22, 1997	Kitt Peak	Spacewatch	·	2.3 km	MPC · JPL
395647	2011 WT_{37}	—	October 2, 2006	Mount Lemmon	Mount Lemmon Survey	·	2.2 km	MPC · JPL
395648	2011 WE_{42}	—	May 20, 2010	WISE	WISE	·	3.0 km	MPC · JPL
395649	2011 WL_{42}	—	September 25, 2005	Kitt Peak	Spacewatch	·	3.2 km	MPC · JPL
395650	2011 WB_{47}	—	March 1, 2008	Kitt Peak	Spacewatch	EOS	1.7 km	MPC · JPL
395651	2011 WY_{48}	—	June 17, 2010	Mount Lemmon	Mount Lemmon Survey	·	2.0 km	MPC · JPL
395652	2011 WH_{50}	—	December 17, 2003	Kitt Peak	Spacewatch	(5)	1.7 km	MPC · JPL
395653	2011 WN_{50}	—	September 25, 2006	Catalina	CSS	·	2.8 km	MPC · JPL
395654	2011 WN_{51}	—	May 31, 2010	WISE	WISE	·	3.8 km	MPC · JPL
395655	2011 WZ_{53}	—	October 15, 2007	Mount Lemmon	Mount Lemmon Survey	·	1.1 km	MPC · JPL
395656	2011 WR_{57}	—	March 4, 2008	Kitt Peak	Spacewatch	HYG	3.2 km	MPC · JPL
395657	2011 WD_{68}	—	December 20, 2006	Mount Lemmon	Mount Lemmon Survey	·	3.9 km	MPC · JPL
395658	2011 WC_{70}	—	November 8, 2005	Socorro	LINEAR	·	5.8 km	MPC · JPL
395659	2011 WO_{78}	—	November 9, 2005	Catalina	CSS	·	3.9 km	MPC · JPL
395660	2011 WT_{79}	—	November 16, 2006	Kitt Peak	Spacewatch	EOS	1.7 km	MPC · JPL
395661	2011 WZ_{79}	—	October 18, 2006	Kitt Peak	Spacewatch	KOR	1.5 km	MPC · JPL
395662	2011 WE_{80}	—	March 1, 2008	Kitt Peak	Spacewatch	·	2.9 km	MPC · JPL
395663	2011 WX_{81}	—	April 1, 2005	Kitt Peak	Spacewatch	·	1.9 km	MPC · JPL
395664	2011 WW_{84}	—	August 30, 2005	Kitt Peak	Spacewatch	·	1.7 km	MPC · JPL
395665	2011 WV_{89}	—	February 18, 2008	Mount Lemmon	Mount Lemmon Survey	EOS	2.2 km	MPC · JPL
395666	2011 WQ_{92}	—	October 3, 2005	Catalina	CSS	·	3.3 km	MPC · JPL
395667	2011 WC_{95}	—	March 8, 2008	Kitt Peak	Spacewatch	·	3.3 km	MPC · JPL
395668	2011 WK_{99}	—	September 17, 2006	Kitt Peak	Spacewatch	·	2.0 km	MPC · JPL
395669	2011 WO_{100}	—	November 18, 2011	Mount Lemmon	Mount Lemmon Survey	·	4.8 km	MPC · JPL
395670	2011 WW_{102}	—	March 5, 1997	Kitt Peak	Spacewatch	·	1.7 km	MPC · JPL
395671	2011 WA_{113}	—	October 2, 2005	Siding Spring	SSS	EUP	5.5 km	MPC · JPL
395672	2011 WD_{117}	—	May 8, 2005	Kitt Peak	Spacewatch	L4	10 km	MPC · JPL
395673	2011 WE_{120}	—	December 22, 2006	Kitt Peak	Spacewatch	EOS	2.1 km	MPC · JPL
395674	2011 WZ_{120}	—	September 17, 2006	Anderson Mesa	LONEOS	·	2.3 km	MPC · JPL
395675	2011 WF_{121}	—	January 1, 2008	Kitt Peak	Spacewatch	·	2.1 km	MPC · JPL
395676	2011 WX_{122}	—	December 13, 2006	Mount Lemmon	Mount Lemmon Survey	·	2.0 km	MPC · JPL
395677	2011 WO_{126}	—	March 6, 2008	Mount Lemmon	Mount Lemmon Survey	·	3.2 km	MPC · JPL
395678	2011 WR_{127}	—	March 18, 2009	Kitt Peak	Spacewatch	·	1.9 km	MPC · JPL
395679	2011 WD_{133}	—	March 1, 2009	Kitt Peak	Spacewatch	·	1.7 km	MPC · JPL
395680	2011 WW_{143}	—	December 13, 2006	Kitt Peak	Spacewatch	EOS	2.1 km	MPC · JPL
395681	2011 WE_{145}	—	October 7, 2005	Mount Lemmon	Mount Lemmon Survey	·	2.9 km	MPC · JPL
395682	2011 WM_{146}	—	April 4, 2003	Kitt Peak	Spacewatch	·	3.1 km	MPC · JPL
395683	2011 WV_{146}	—	May 15, 2009	Kitt Peak	Spacewatch	EOS	2.0 km	MPC · JPL
395684	2011 WO_{153}	—	September 23, 2005	Kitt Peak	Spacewatch	VER	2.6 km	MPC · JPL
395685	2011 YQ	—	May 18, 2010	WISE	WISE	·	3.8 km	MPC · JPL
395686	2011 YB_{2}	—	November 11, 1999	Kitt Peak	Spacewatch	·	4.5 km	MPC · JPL
395687	2011 YS_{2}	—	October 30, 2005	Kitt Peak	Spacewatch	HYG	3.1 km	MPC · JPL
395688	2011 YG_{21}	—	July 31, 2010	WISE	WISE	T_{j} (2.97) · EUP	6.8 km	MPC · JPL
395689	2011 YS_{22}	—	December 1, 2005	Kitt Peak	Spacewatch	VER	2.7 km	MPC · JPL
395690	2011 YL_{52}	—	October 7, 2005	Catalina	CSS	·	3.5 km	MPC · JPL
395691	2011 YE_{59}	—	July 14, 2010	WISE	WISE	·	3.1 km	MPC · JPL
395692	2012 AF_{1}	—	November 12, 2010	Mount Lemmon	Mount Lemmon Survey	L4	8.4 km	MPC · JPL
395693	2012 AM_{11}	—	July 5, 2010	WISE	WISE	·	7.2 km	MPC · JPL
395694	2012 AQ_{13}	—	October 29, 2010	Mount Lemmon	Mount Lemmon Survey	3:2	6.7 km	MPC · JPL
395695	2012 AW_{21}	—	September 4, 2008	Kitt Peak	Spacewatch	L4	11 km	MPC · JPL
395696	2012 BB_{27}	—	November 15, 2009	Catalina	CSS	L4	9.5 km	MPC · JPL
395697	2012 BE_{127}	—	December 26, 2005	Kitt Peak	Spacewatch	VER	4.3 km	MPC · JPL
395698	2012 BO_{129}	—	January 8, 2002	Socorro	LINEAR	·	1.9 km	MPC · JPL
395699	2012 GN_{12}	—	January 1, 2008	Kitt Peak	Spacewatch	centaur	40 km	MPC · JPL
395700	2012 OM_{5}	—	November 24, 2003	Socorro	LINEAR	·	3.0 km	MPC · JPL

== 395701–395800 ==
back to top

Designation			Discovery			Properties		Ref
Permanent	Provisional	Named after	Date	Site	Discoverer(s)	Category	Diam.	Ref
395701	2012 RC_{22}	—	September 30, 2008	Mount Lemmon	Mount Lemmon Survey	·	1.4 km	MPC · JPL
395702	2012 RY_{26}	—	October 10, 1999	Socorro	LINEAR	·	1.8 km	MPC · JPL
395703	2012 SB	—	October 3, 1999	Catalina	CSS	H	610 m	MPC · JPL
395704	2012 SE_{55}	—	March 26, 2007	Kitt Peak	Spacewatch	·	850 m	MPC · JPL
395705	2012 SY_{56}	—	May 10, 2007	Mount Lemmon	Mount Lemmon Survey	PHO	1.3 km	MPC · JPL
395706	2012 SO_{59}	—	August 30, 2008	Socorro	LINEAR	·	1.6 km	MPC · JPL
395707	2012 TB_{5}	—	September 14, 2004	Socorro	LINEAR	H	530 m	MPC · JPL
395708	2012 TE_{33}	—	November 23, 2008	Catalina	CSS	·	2.1 km	MPC · JPL
395709	2012 TP_{79}	—	November 12, 1999	Socorro	LINEAR	H	730 m	MPC · JPL
395710	2012 TJ_{82}	—	July 30, 2008	Catalina	CSS	·	1.8 km	MPC · JPL
395711	2012 TQ_{98}	—	March 9, 2005	Kitt Peak	Spacewatch	CLO	2.0 km	MPC · JPL
395712	2012 TZ_{131}	—	September 29, 2008	Mount Lemmon	Mount Lemmon Survey	·	1.7 km	MPC · JPL
395713	2012 TA_{150}	—	March 16, 2004	Kitt Peak	Spacewatch	·	580 m	MPC · JPL
395714	2012 TL_{161}	—	December 6, 2002	Socorro	LINEAR	·	690 m	MPC · JPL
395715	2012 TF_{169}	—	April 27, 1998	Kitt Peak	Spacewatch	H	610 m	MPC · JPL
395716	2012 TT_{174}	—	September 25, 2005	Kitt Peak	Spacewatch	·	620 m	MPC · JPL
395717	2012 TV_{196}	—	November 8, 2009	Mount Lemmon	Mount Lemmon Survey	·	910 m	MPC · JPL
395718	2012 TR_{209}	—	December 4, 2008	Kitt Peak	Spacewatch	AGN	1.6 km	MPC · JPL
395719	2012 TZ_{270}	—	January 17, 2005	Kitt Peak	Spacewatch	·	1.0 km	MPC · JPL
395720	2012 TE_{295}	—	November 20, 2001	Socorro	LINEAR	·	1 km	MPC · JPL
395721	2012 TP_{304}	—	April 14, 2010	Mount Lemmon	Mount Lemmon Survey	·	3.2 km	MPC · JPL
395722	2012 TE_{311}	—	March 17, 2004	Kitt Peak	Spacewatch	·	1.4 km	MPC · JPL
395723	2012 TZ_{321}	—	June 11, 2011	Mount Lemmon	Mount Lemmon Survey	EOS	2.3 km	MPC · JPL
395724	2012 UZ_{18}	—	April 15, 2008	Mount Lemmon	Mount Lemmon Survey	H	440 m	MPC · JPL
395725	2012 UB_{31}	—	March 18, 2010	Mount Lemmon	Mount Lemmon Survey	·	1.8 km	MPC · JPL
395726	2012 UA_{33}	—	March 12, 2007	Mount Lemmon	Mount Lemmon Survey	·	770 m	MPC · JPL
395727	2012 UG_{41}	—	September 15, 2012	Kitt Peak	Spacewatch	·	760 m	MPC · JPL
395728	2012 UN_{41}	—	February 27, 2007	Kitt Peak	Spacewatch	·	600 m	MPC · JPL
395729	2012 UU_{43}	—	November 19, 2003	Kitt Peak	Spacewatch	·	1.5 km	MPC · JPL
395730	2012 UY_{44}	—	September 29, 2008	Mount Lemmon	Mount Lemmon Survey	·	1.4 km	MPC · JPL
395731	2012 UA_{48}	—	March 10, 2005	Catalina	CSS	·	1.9 km	MPC · JPL
395732	2012 UX_{57}	—	December 14, 2006	Kitt Peak	Spacewatch	·	860 m	MPC · JPL
395733	2012 UO_{77}	—	November 23, 2008	Catalina	CSS	EUN	1.3 km	MPC · JPL
395734	2012 UZ_{77}	—	November 25, 2005	Kitt Peak	Spacewatch	NYS	970 m	MPC · JPL
395735	2012 UE_{78}	—	October 6, 2012	Mount Lemmon	Mount Lemmon Survey	·	1.6 km	MPC · JPL
395736	2012 UX_{83}	—	December 30, 2005	Kitt Peak	Spacewatch	·	1.1 km	MPC · JPL
395737	2012 UC_{87}	—	April 30, 2011	Mount Lemmon	Mount Lemmon Survey	·	960 m	MPC · JPL
395738	2012 UY_{89}	—	January 31, 2006	Kitt Peak	Spacewatch	NYS	1.2 km	MPC · JPL
395739	2012 UC_{109}	—	October 1, 2005	Mount Lemmon	Mount Lemmon Survey	·	870 m	MPC · JPL
395740	2012 UM_{119}	—	October 12, 2005	Kitt Peak	Spacewatch	·	700 m	MPC · JPL
395741	2012 UX_{123}	—	September 11, 2007	Mount Lemmon	Mount Lemmon Survey	·	2.9 km	MPC · JPL
395742	2012 UZ_{123}	—	March 18, 2010	Mount Lemmon	Mount Lemmon Survey	·	800 m	MPC · JPL
395743	2012 UQ_{125}	—	October 10, 2008	Mount Lemmon	Mount Lemmon Survey	V	760 m	MPC · JPL
395744	2012 UJ_{126}	—	December 18, 2003	Kitt Peak	Spacewatch	DOR	2.5 km	MPC · JPL
395745	2012 UJ_{147}	—	November 10, 2004	Kitt Peak	Spacewatch	·	1.1 km	MPC · JPL
395746	2012 UN_{152}	—	October 20, 2008	Mount Lemmon	Mount Lemmon Survey	·	1.3 km	MPC · JPL
395747	2012 UR_{162}	—	January 28, 2007	Mount Lemmon	Mount Lemmon Survey	·	590 m	MPC · JPL
395748	2012 UR_{169}	—	December 1, 2003	Socorro	LINEAR	·	2.5 km	MPC · JPL
395749	2012 UL_{172}	—	February 16, 2010	Mount Lemmon	Mount Lemmon Survey	·	940 m	MPC · JPL
395750	2012 UP_{176}	—	December 6, 2005	Kitt Peak	Spacewatch	·	1.1 km	MPC · JPL
395751	2012 VO_{11}	—	November 21, 2005	Kitt Peak	Spacewatch	·	1.1 km	MPC · JPL
395752	2012 VP_{14}	—	February 28, 2009	Mount Lemmon	Mount Lemmon Survey	·	1.9 km	MPC · JPL
395753	2012 VH_{21}	—	March 8, 2005	Catalina	CSS	·	2.1 km	MPC · JPL
395754	2012 VA_{23}	—	October 7, 2005	Kitt Peak	Spacewatch	·	650 m	MPC · JPL
395755	2012 VV_{23}	—	November 25, 2005	Mount Lemmon	Mount Lemmon Survey	·	950 m	MPC · JPL
395756	2012 VJ_{28}	—	October 20, 2008	Kitt Peak	Spacewatch	(5)	990 m	MPC · JPL
395757	2012 VB_{34}	—	April 22, 2007	Catalina	CSS	BAP	1.4 km	MPC · JPL
395758	2012 VG_{35}	—	November 17, 2009	Mount Lemmon	Mount Lemmon Survey	·	610 m	MPC · JPL
395759	2012 VL_{35}	—	January 7, 2005	Campo Imperatore	CINEOS	(5)	1.2 km	MPC · JPL
395760	2012 VY_{36}	—	August 21, 2006	Siding Spring	SSS	H	700 m	MPC · JPL
395761	2012 VR_{39}	—	September 3, 2007	Mount Lemmon	Mount Lemmon Survey	EUN	1.5 km	MPC · JPL
395762	2012 VS_{39}	—	November 16, 2006	Mount Lemmon	Mount Lemmon Survey	·	800 m	MPC · JPL
395763	2012 VP_{41}	—	November 23, 2009	Kitt Peak	Spacewatch	·	580 m	MPC · JPL
395764	2012 VW_{42}	—	August 29, 2005	Kitt Peak	Spacewatch	·	840 m	MPC · JPL
395765	2012 VC_{44}	—	January 18, 2004	Kitt Peak	Spacewatch	·	600 m	MPC · JPL
395766	2012 VP_{45}	—	October 6, 2008	Mount Lemmon	Mount Lemmon Survey	PHO	940 m	MPC · JPL
395767	2012 VH_{54}	—	September 4, 2008	Kitt Peak	Spacewatch	·	1.1 km	MPC · JPL
395768	2012 VU_{56}	—	November 29, 2005	Kitt Peak	Spacewatch	NYS	860 m	MPC · JPL
395769	2012 VT_{57}	—	October 8, 2012	Mount Lemmon	Mount Lemmon Survey	·	1.0 km	MPC · JPL
395770	2012 VW_{59}	—	November 20, 2009	Mount Lemmon	Mount Lemmon Survey	·	750 m	MPC · JPL
395771	2012 VP_{60}	—	March 19, 2010	Mount Lemmon	Mount Lemmon Survey	·	1.2 km	MPC · JPL
395772	2012 VD_{62}	—	January 31, 2009	Mount Lemmon	Mount Lemmon Survey	·	1.3 km	MPC · JPL
395773	2012 VK_{69}	—	January 28, 2006	Kitt Peak	Spacewatch	NYS	890 m	MPC · JPL
395774	2012 VZ_{74}	—	July 7, 2005	Kitt Peak	Spacewatch	·	3.1 km	MPC · JPL
395775	2012 VN_{75}	—	January 21, 2002	Kitt Peak	Spacewatch	·	1.0 km	MPC · JPL
395776	2012 VN_{77}	—	January 8, 2006	Mount Lemmon	Mount Lemmon Survey	NYS	1.1 km	MPC · JPL
395777	2012 VZ_{82}	—	March 9, 2005	Catalina	CSS	ADE	2.0 km	MPC · JPL
395778	2012 VG_{88}	—	October 7, 2008	Mount Lemmon	Mount Lemmon Survey	(5)	1.8 km	MPC · JPL
395779	2012 VH_{88}	—	December 14, 1999	Kitt Peak	Spacewatch	·	930 m	MPC · JPL
395780	2012 VD_{89}	—	December 7, 1999	Socorro	LINEAR	·	1.6 km	MPC · JPL
395781	2012 VF_{90}	—	November 14, 2012	Kitt Peak	Spacewatch	·	1.0 km	MPC · JPL
395782	2012 VT_{92}	—	September 20, 2001	Kitt Peak	Spacewatch	NYS	890 m	MPC · JPL
395783	2012 VF_{98}	—	October 21, 2003	Kitt Peak	Spacewatch	·	2.0 km	MPC · JPL
395784	2012 VS_{100}	—	November 5, 1999	Kitt Peak	Spacewatch	·	1.8 km	MPC · JPL
395785	2012 VB_{101}	—	December 10, 1998	Kitt Peak	Spacewatch	·	1.1 km	MPC · JPL
395786	2012 VB_{111}	—	April 26, 2007	Kitt Peak	Spacewatch	V	570 m	MPC · JPL
395787	2012 WT	—	April 19, 2006	Mount Lemmon	Mount Lemmon Survey	·	1.0 km	MPC · JPL
395788	2012 WV_{1}	—	January 23, 2006	Kitt Peak	Spacewatch	·	910 m	MPC · JPL
395789	2012 WZ_{1}	—	December 18, 2009	Mount Lemmon	Mount Lemmon Survey	·	720 m	MPC · JPL
395790	2012 WC_{4}	—	November 4, 2008	Kitt Peak	Spacewatch	·	1.8 km	MPC · JPL
395791	2012 WK_{7}	—	March 15, 2010	Mount Lemmon	Mount Lemmon Survey	MAS	540 m	MPC · JPL
395792	2012 WS_{14}	—	November 8, 2008	Mount Lemmon	Mount Lemmon Survey	·	1.1 km	MPC · JPL
395793	2012 WL_{17}	—	December 9, 2004	Kitt Peak	Spacewatch	·	980 m	MPC · JPL
395794	2012 WO_{18}	—	August 20, 2008	Kitt Peak	Spacewatch	·	840 m	MPC · JPL
395795	2012 WZ_{19}	—	May 7, 2010	Mount Lemmon	Mount Lemmon Survey	·	2.1 km	MPC · JPL
395796	2012 WT_{21}	—	November 18, 2009	Mount Lemmon	Mount Lemmon Survey	·	800 m	MPC · JPL
395797	2012 WX_{21}	—	February 14, 2005	Catalina	CSS	·	2.4 km	MPC · JPL
395798	2012 WW_{22}	—	April 5, 2010	Kitt Peak	Spacewatch	·	1.9 km	MPC · JPL
395799	2012 WD_{25}	—	February 2, 2006	Kitt Peak	Spacewatch	·	1.4 km	MPC · JPL
395800	2012 WC_{30}	—	January 6, 2010	Mount Lemmon	Mount Lemmon Survey	·	820 m	MPC · JPL

== 395801–395900 ==
back to top

Designation			Discovery			Properties		Ref
Permanent	Provisional	Named after	Date	Site	Discoverer(s)	Category	Diam.	Ref
395801	2012 WC_{31}	—	January 4, 2006	Kitt Peak	Spacewatch	MAS	650 m	MPC · JPL
395802	2012 WB_{35}	—	October 19, 1999	Kitt Peak	Spacewatch	·	1.7 km	MPC · JPL
395803	2012 XT_{2}	—	December 12, 1998	Kitt Peak	Spacewatch	·	850 m	MPC · JPL
395804	2012 XR_{6}	—	October 24, 2008	Mount Lemmon	Mount Lemmon Survey	·	1.7 km	MPC · JPL
395805	2012 XW_{11}	—	November 20, 2001	Socorro	LINEAR	·	1.1 km	MPC · JPL
395806	2012 XX_{12}	—	December 2, 2004	Socorro	LINEAR	·	1.8 km	MPC · JPL
395807	2012 XD_{16}	—	September 14, 2005	Catalina	CSS	·	830 m	MPC · JPL
395808	2012 XO_{21}	—	September 30, 2005	Kitt Peak	Spacewatch	·	640 m	MPC · JPL
395809	2012 XA_{24}	—	December 18, 2009	Mount Lemmon	Mount Lemmon Survey	·	680 m	MPC · JPL
395810	2012 XV_{24}	—	May 31, 2008	Mount Lemmon	Mount Lemmon Survey	·	820 m	MPC · JPL
395811	2012 XT_{25}	—	September 23, 2008	Mount Lemmon	Mount Lemmon Survey	V	720 m	MPC · JPL
395812	2012 XK_{27}	—	November 24, 1997	Kitt Peak	Spacewatch	·	1.3 km	MPC · JPL
395813	2012 XJ_{28}	—	November 18, 2008	Kitt Peak	Spacewatch	·	1.2 km	MPC · JPL
395814	2012 XK_{28}	—	December 7, 2005	Kitt Peak	Spacewatch	·	1.1 km	MPC · JPL
395815	2012 XQ_{33}	—	November 30, 2005	Kitt Peak	Spacewatch	·	960 m	MPC · JPL
395816	2012 XY_{36}	—	April 25, 2006	Mount Lemmon	Mount Lemmon Survey	·	1.2 km	MPC · JPL
395817	2012 XJ_{38}	—	April 15, 2007	Catalina	CSS	V	740 m	MPC · JPL
395818	2012 XE_{41}	—	October 12, 2007	Mount Lemmon	Mount Lemmon Survey	·	2.0 km	MPC · JPL
395819	2012 XD_{42}	—	April 18, 2010	WISE	WISE	·	4.5 km	MPC · JPL
395820	2012 XB_{45}	—	October 27, 2005	Kitt Peak	Spacewatch	·	680 m	MPC · JPL
395821	2012 XB_{50}	—	November 5, 2007	Kitt Peak	Spacewatch	·	1.8 km	MPC · JPL
395822	2012 XB_{53}	—	October 1, 2003	Anderson Mesa	LONEOS	·	1.7 km	MPC · JPL
395823	2012 XS_{56}	—	March 12, 2007	Mount Lemmon	Mount Lemmon Survey	·	770 m	MPC · JPL
395824	2012 XX_{56}	—	February 14, 2010	Kitt Peak	Spacewatch	·	1.1 km	MPC · JPL
395825	2012 XN_{62}	—	January 13, 2002	Socorro	LINEAR	PHO	1.1 km	MPC · JPL
395826	2012 XN_{64}	—	May 11, 2010	Mount Lemmon	Mount Lemmon Survey	BRG	1.6 km	MPC · JPL
395827	2012 XU_{71}	—	December 17, 2009	Kitt Peak	Spacewatch	·	770 m	MPC · JPL
395828	2012 XN_{76}	—	April 18, 2007	Kitt Peak	Spacewatch	V	580 m	MPC · JPL
395829	2012 XD_{77}	—	October 24, 2008	Kitt Peak	Spacewatch	·	1.4 km	MPC · JPL
395830	2012 XG_{78}	—	April 11, 2007	Kitt Peak	Spacewatch	·	1.1 km	MPC · JPL
395831	2012 XN_{80}	—	October 2, 2008	Catalina	CSS	·	1.6 km	MPC · JPL
395832	2012 XF_{84}	—	August 29, 2005	Kitt Peak	Spacewatch	·	3.2 km	MPC · JPL
395833	2012 XE_{96}	—	October 7, 2004	Socorro	LINEAR	·	1.5 km	MPC · JPL
395834	2012 XO_{97}	—	October 23, 2005	Catalina	CSS	·	750 m	MPC · JPL
395835	2012 XH_{102}	—	November 9, 1999	Socorro	LINEAR	EUN	1.4 km	MPC · JPL
395836	2012 XU_{104}	—	May 10, 2005	Kitt Peak	Spacewatch	CLO	1.9 km	MPC · JPL
395837	2012 XM_{105}	—	November 15, 1995	Kitt Peak	Spacewatch	·	1.7 km	MPC · JPL
395838	2012 XC_{106}	—	December 3, 2008	Mount Lemmon	Mount Lemmon Survey	·	1.5 km	MPC · JPL
395839	2012 XC_{107}	—	November 30, 2008	Kitt Peak	Spacewatch	(5)	1.3 km	MPC · JPL
395840	2012 XG_{107}	—	November 18, 2007	Mount Lemmon	Mount Lemmon Survey	EMA	3.6 km	MPC · JPL
395841	2012 XP_{107}	—	November 30, 2008	Mount Lemmon	Mount Lemmon Survey	·	1.6 km	MPC · JPL
395842	2012 XN_{110}	—	December 21, 2008	Catalina	CSS	·	2.6 km	MPC · JPL
395843	2012 XN_{120}	—	December 11, 2004	Kitt Peak	Spacewatch	·	1.2 km	MPC · JPL
395844	2012 XU_{135}	—	April 2, 2009	Mount Lemmon	Mount Lemmon Survey	·	3.1 km	MPC · JPL
395845	2012 XN_{136}	—	December 3, 2008	Mount Lemmon	Mount Lemmon Survey	MAR	1.3 km	MPC · JPL
395846	2012 XV_{137}	—	December 19, 1995	Kitt Peak	Spacewatch	·	1.8 km	MPC · JPL
395847	2012 XA_{141}	—	December 21, 2003	Kitt Peak	Spacewatch	·	1.2 km	MPC · JPL
395848	2012 XZ_{141}	—	January 8, 1999	Kitt Peak	Spacewatch	·	880 m	MPC · JPL
395849	2012 XO_{143}	—	December 1, 2005	Kitt Peak	Spacewatch	V	830 m	MPC · JPL
395850	2012 XX_{150}	—	September 11, 2001	Socorro	LINEAR	·	810 m	MPC · JPL
395851	2012 XV_{152}	—	December 30, 2008	Mount Lemmon	Mount Lemmon Survey	·	1.9 km	MPC · JPL
395852	2012 XF_{154}	—	February 3, 2009	Mount Lemmon	Mount Lemmon Survey	·	1.6 km	MPC · JPL
395853	2012 YT	—	December 31, 2002	Socorro	LINEAR	·	730 m	MPC · JPL
395854	2012 YH_{2}	—	January 13, 2005	Catalina	CSS	·	1.4 km	MPC · JPL
395855	2013 AN_{1}	—	September 15, 2006	Kitt Peak	Spacewatch	KOR	1.3 km	MPC · JPL
395856	2013 AY_{2}	—	February 7, 2002	Kitt Peak	Spacewatch	·	2.5 km	MPC · JPL
395857	2013 AA_{3}	—	December 30, 2008	Mount Lemmon	Mount Lemmon Survey	·	1.2 km	MPC · JPL
395858	2013 AS_{4}	—	November 11, 2007	Mount Lemmon	Mount Lemmon Survey	·	1.8 km	MPC · JPL
395859	2013 AD_{5}	—	April 14, 2010	Mount Lemmon	Mount Lemmon Survey	·	1.6 km	MPC · JPL
395860	2013 AF_{5}	—	November 30, 2008	Mount Lemmon	Mount Lemmon Survey	(5)	1 km	MPC · JPL
395861	2013 AV_{6}	—	September 28, 2003	Anderson Mesa	LONEOS	(5)	1.6 km	MPC · JPL
395862	2013 AO_{7}	—	September 20, 2011	Catalina	CSS	·	3.2 km	MPC · JPL
395863	2013 AW_{8}	—	December 2, 2008	Mount Lemmon	Mount Lemmon Survey	·	1.3 km	MPC · JPL
395864	2013 AG_{14}	—	May 30, 2006	Mount Lemmon	Mount Lemmon Survey	·	1.9 km	MPC · JPL
395865	2013 AW_{14}	—	March 25, 2003	Kitt Peak	Spacewatch	·	2.4 km	MPC · JPL
395866	2013 AU_{18}	—	September 10, 2007	Kitt Peak	Spacewatch	·	1.3 km	MPC · JPL
395867	2013 AJ_{19}	—	September 9, 2007	Kitt Peak	Spacewatch	·	1.3 km	MPC · JPL
395868	2013 AZ_{20}	—	May 16, 2009	Mount Lemmon	Mount Lemmon Survey	·	3.2 km	MPC · JPL
395869	2013 AF_{21}	—	October 11, 2007	Catalina	CSS	·	1.8 km	MPC · JPL
395870	2013 AS_{22}	—	May 18, 2005	Siding Spring	SSS	·	2.1 km	MPC · JPL
395871	2013 AF_{23}	—	October 20, 2007	Mount Lemmon	Mount Lemmon Survey	·	1.6 km	MPC · JPL
395872	2013 AA_{24}	—	June 8, 1997	Kitt Peak	Spacewatch	HNS	1.3 km	MPC · JPL
395873	2013 AQ_{25}	—	December 6, 2007	Kitt Peak	Spacewatch	·	2.8 km	MPC · JPL
395874	2013 AR_{26}	—	December 24, 2005	Kitt Peak	Spacewatch	·	1.1 km	MPC · JPL
395875	2013 AW_{27}	—	November 24, 2003	Kitt Peak	Spacewatch	EUN	1.4 km	MPC · JPL
395876	2013 AW_{28}	—	November 20, 2000	Kitt Peak	Spacewatch	VER	3.1 km	MPC · JPL
395877	2013 AJ_{29}	—	October 30, 2005	Kitt Peak	Spacewatch	V	700 m	MPC · JPL
395878	2013 AU_{29}	—	April 2, 2006	Kitt Peak	Spacewatch	·	1.1 km	MPC · JPL
395879	2013 AR_{32}	—	April 22, 2009	Mount Lemmon	Mount Lemmon Survey	·	5.5 km	MPC · JPL
395880	2013 AM_{35}	—	August 28, 2006	Kitt Peak	Spacewatch	AGN	1.2 km	MPC · JPL
395881	2013 AT_{35}	—	November 19, 2006	Kitt Peak	Spacewatch	·	2.7 km	MPC · JPL
395882	2013 AQ_{38}	—	October 29, 2000	Kitt Peak	Spacewatch	·	1.3 km	MPC · JPL
395883	2013 AC_{39}	—	February 11, 2008	Mount Lemmon	Mount Lemmon Survey	·	2.7 km	MPC · JPL
395884	2013 AU_{39}	—	March 5, 2008	Mount Lemmon	Mount Lemmon Survey	EMA	2.9 km	MPC · JPL
395885	2013 AG_{40}	—	February 20, 2009	Kitt Peak	Spacewatch	HOF	2.3 km	MPC · JPL
395886	2013 AF_{42}	—	September 17, 2003	Kitt Peak	Spacewatch	·	1.2 km	MPC · JPL
395887	2013 AJ_{42}	—	February 13, 2008	Kitt Peak	Spacewatch	·	2.2 km	MPC · JPL
395888	2013 AK_{42}	—	December 5, 2002	Socorro	LINEAR	·	2.7 km	MPC · JPL
395889	2013 AN_{42}	—	October 3, 2006	Mount Lemmon	Mount Lemmon Survey	·	1.7 km	MPC · JPL
395890	2013 AV_{42}	—	March 1, 2009	Kitt Peak	Spacewatch	·	2.3 km	MPC · JPL
395891	2013 AV_{43}	—	August 29, 2006	Kitt Peak	Spacewatch	AGN	1.7 km	MPC · JPL
395892	2013 AZ_{45}	—	March 11, 2008	Catalina	CSS	·	3.3 km	MPC · JPL
395893	2013 AE_{46}	—	September 28, 2006	Kitt Peak	Spacewatch	·	2.3 km	MPC · JPL
395894	2013 AM_{46}	—	November 20, 2006	Mount Lemmon	Mount Lemmon Survey	·	1.9 km	MPC · JPL
395895	2013 AH_{49}	—	December 19, 2007	Mount Lemmon	Mount Lemmon Survey	·	2.4 km	MPC · JPL
395896	2013 AT_{49}	—	November 17, 2006	Mount Lemmon	Mount Lemmon Survey	EOS	1.9 km	MPC · JPL
395897	2013 AL_{52}	—	September 14, 2007	Catalina	CSS	·	1.5 km	MPC · JPL
395898	2013 AN_{52}	—	December 18, 2001	Socorro	LINEAR	·	3.0 km	MPC · JPL
395899	2013 AH_{61}	—	March 24, 2009	Mount Lemmon	Mount Lemmon Survey	MRX	910 m	MPC · JPL
395900	2013 AU_{63}	—	January 1, 2008	Mount Lemmon	Mount Lemmon Survey	·	3.0 km	MPC · JPL

== 395901–396000 ==
back to top

Designation			Discovery			Properties		Ref
Permanent	Provisional	Named after	Date	Site	Discoverer(s)	Category	Diam.	Ref
395901	2013 AH_{72}	—	December 18, 2003	Socorro	LINEAR	·	1.8 km	MPC · JPL
395902	2013 AK_{72}	—	May 4, 2009	Mount Lemmon	Mount Lemmon Survey	·	2.1 km	MPC · JPL
395903	2013 AV_{73}	—	May 9, 2005	Mount Lemmon	Mount Lemmon Survey	·	1.7 km	MPC · JPL
395904	2013 AD_{74}	—	January 29, 2009	Mount Lemmon	Mount Lemmon Survey	·	1.8 km	MPC · JPL
395905	2013 AW_{75}	—	October 20, 2012	Mount Lemmon	Mount Lemmon Survey	PHO	1.3 km	MPC · JPL
395906	2013 AK_{77}	—	November 2, 2007	Kitt Peak	Spacewatch	·	1.9 km	MPC · JPL
395907	2013 AC_{78}	—	September 27, 2011	Mount Lemmon	Mount Lemmon Survey	615	1.6 km	MPC · JPL
395908	2013 AY_{79}	—	October 22, 2003	Kitt Peak	Spacewatch	·	1.1 km	MPC · JPL
395909	2013 AA_{80}	—	November 18, 2003	Kitt Peak	Spacewatch	·	1.5 km	MPC · JPL
395910	2013 AQ_{80}	—	July 1, 2011	Mount Lemmon	Mount Lemmon Survey	·	2.9 km	MPC · JPL
395911	2013 AK_{84}	—	October 20, 2007	Mount Lemmon	Mount Lemmon Survey	AGN	1.3 km	MPC · JPL
395912	2013 AM_{87}	—	September 27, 2006	Kitt Peak	Spacewatch	·	1.9 km	MPC · JPL
395913	2013 AR_{87}	—	October 12, 2007	Mount Lemmon	Mount Lemmon Survey	·	1.8 km	MPC · JPL
395914	2013 AT_{87}	—	February 9, 2005	Kitt Peak	Spacewatch	·	1.5 km	MPC · JPL
395915	2013 AY_{88}	—	March 14, 2004	Kitt Peak	Spacewatch	AGN	1.3 km	MPC · JPL
395916	2013 AP_{89}	—	December 19, 2003	Kitt Peak	Spacewatch	·	2.4 km	MPC · JPL
395917	2013 AQ_{89}	—	June 3, 2005	Kitt Peak	Spacewatch	·	2.8 km	MPC · JPL
395918	2013 AG_{90}	—	April 11, 2005	Kitt Peak	Spacewatch	·	2.2 km	MPC · JPL
395919	2013 AH_{90}	—	November 7, 2007	Mount Lemmon	Mount Lemmon Survey	·	2.4 km	MPC · JPL
395920	2013 AH_{92}	—	September 10, 2007	Mount Lemmon	Mount Lemmon Survey	·	2.1 km	MPC · JPL
395921	2013 AQ_{92}	—	November 4, 2004	Kitt Peak	Spacewatch	·	1.7 km	MPC · JPL
395922	2013 AU_{92}	—	October 19, 2006	Mount Lemmon	Mount Lemmon Survey	·	2.3 km	MPC · JPL
395923	2013 AD_{93}	—	December 19, 2007	Mount Lemmon	Mount Lemmon Survey	EOS	2.1 km	MPC · JPL
395924	2013 AP_{94}	—	November 8, 2008	Mount Lemmon	Mount Lemmon Survey	·	1.7 km	MPC · JPL
395925	2013 AR_{95}	—	March 4, 2008	Mount Lemmon	Mount Lemmon Survey	EOS	2.3 km	MPC · JPL
395926	2013 AX_{95}	—	December 18, 2001	Socorro	LINEAR	·	3.4 km	MPC · JPL
395927	2013 AV_{96}	—	January 25, 2009	Kitt Peak	Spacewatch	·	1.5 km	MPC · JPL
395928	2013 AG_{97}	—	February 3, 2006	Socorro	LINEAR	PHO	2.9 km	MPC · JPL
395929	2013 AM_{100}	—	October 20, 2003	Kitt Peak	Spacewatch	·	1.4 km	MPC · JPL
395930	2013 AY_{102}	—	October 9, 1996	Kitt Peak	Spacewatch	V	750 m	MPC · JPL
395931	2013 AY_{104}	—	February 11, 2004	Kitt Peak	Spacewatch	·	2.5 km	MPC · JPL
395932	2013 AK_{105}	—	November 19, 2007	Kitt Peak	Spacewatch	(11882)	1.6 km	MPC · JPL
395933	2013 AY_{105}	—	February 28, 2009	Kitt Peak	Spacewatch	PAD	1.6 km	MPC · JPL
395934	2013 AQ_{106}	—	November 3, 2007	Mount Lemmon	Mount Lemmon Survey	·	2.1 km	MPC · JPL
395935	2013 AC_{107}	—	November 20, 2000	Socorro	LINEAR	·	1.9 km	MPC · JPL
395936	2013 AE_{107}	—	August 29, 2006	Kitt Peak	Spacewatch	AGN	1.2 km	MPC · JPL
395937	2013 AY_{109}	—	January 19, 2008	Mount Lemmon	Mount Lemmon Survey	·	3.2 km	MPC · JPL
395938	2013 AG_{110}	—	March 2, 2009	Kitt Peak	Spacewatch	HOF	2.8 km	MPC · JPL
395939	2013 AG_{115}	—	September 27, 1995	Kitt Peak	Spacewatch	(5)	1.3 km	MPC · JPL
395940	2013 AH_{116}	—	December 16, 2004	Kitt Peak	Spacewatch	·	1.7 km	MPC · JPL
395941	2013 AD_{119}	—	November 18, 2007	Mount Lemmon	Mount Lemmon Survey	·	2.4 km	MPC · JPL
395942	2013 AM_{121}	—	January 16, 2004	Kitt Peak	Spacewatch	·	1.9 km	MPC · JPL
395943	2013 AN_{121}	—	December 15, 2004	Socorro	LINEAR	NYS	1.4 km	MPC · JPL
395944	2013 AL_{122}	—	December 3, 2007	Kitt Peak	Spacewatch	·	3.5 km	MPC · JPL
395945	2013 AW_{125}	—	November 23, 2003	Anderson Mesa	LONEOS	·	2.2 km	MPC · JPL
395946	2013 AF_{127}	—	December 18, 2007	Kitt Peak	Spacewatch	·	1.9 km	MPC · JPL
395947	2013 AY_{127}	—	January 9, 2006	Kitt Peak	Spacewatch	·	1.2 km	MPC · JPL
395948	2013 AE_{129}	—	August 28, 2006	Kitt Peak	Spacewatch	AGN	1.5 km	MPC · JPL
395949	2013 AJ_{129}	—	October 22, 2011	Kitt Peak	Spacewatch	·	3.8 km	MPC · JPL
395950	2013 AZ_{129}	—	February 24, 2008	Mount Lemmon	Mount Lemmon Survey	·	2.6 km	MPC · JPL
395951	2013 AG_{130}	—	April 12, 2004	Kitt Peak	Spacewatch	·	1.9 km	MPC · JPL
395952	2013 AV_{133}	—	November 30, 2008	Mount Lemmon	Mount Lemmon Survey	V	880 m	MPC · JPL
395953	2013 AY_{134}	—	February 4, 2000	Kitt Peak	Spacewatch	·	1.7 km	MPC · JPL
395954	2013 AA_{135}	—	September 2, 2010	Mount Lemmon	Mount Lemmon Survey	·	3.1 km	MPC · JPL
395955	2013 AP_{135}	—	February 28, 2008	Mount Lemmon	Mount Lemmon Survey	·	2.7 km	MPC · JPL
395956	2013 AX_{149}	—	April 29, 2008	Mount Lemmon	Mount Lemmon Survey	CYB	2.9 km	MPC · JPL
395957	2013 AD_{161}	—	November 17, 2006	Mount Lemmon	Mount Lemmon Survey	·	2.8 km	MPC · JPL
395958	2013 AO_{162}	—	April 13, 2004	Kitt Peak	Spacewatch	·	1.9 km	MPC · JPL
395959	2013 AH_{163}	—	November 23, 2006	Mount Lemmon	Mount Lemmon Survey	·	2.3 km	MPC · JPL
395960	2013 AA_{165}	—	April 5, 2003	Kitt Peak	Spacewatch	·	2.5 km	MPC · JPL
395961	2013 AU_{171}	—	September 23, 2011	Kitt Peak	Spacewatch	·	2.4 km	MPC · JPL
395962	2013 AP_{174}	—	October 3, 2006	Mount Lemmon	Mount Lemmon Survey	EOS	1.3 km	MPC · JPL
395963	2013 AQ_{174}	—	November 4, 1999	Kitt Peak	Spacewatch	·	1.3 km	MPC · JPL
395964	2013 AR_{174}	—	March 24, 2009	Mount Lemmon	Mount Lemmon Survey	BRA	1.6 km	MPC · JPL
395965	2013 AS_{179}	—	September 5, 2010	Mount Lemmon	Mount Lemmon Survey	·	3.4 km	MPC · JPL
395966	2013 BQ_{3}	—	November 1, 2007	Kitt Peak	Spacewatch	·	1.7 km	MPC · JPL
395967	2013 BS_{5}	—	February 8, 2008	Kitt Peak	Spacewatch	·	3.2 km	MPC · JPL
395968	2013 BU_{5}	—	March 1, 2008	Kitt Peak	Spacewatch	·	2.9 km	MPC · JPL
395969	2013 BO_{6}	—	March 29, 2000	Kitt Peak	Spacewatch	·	2.0 km	MPC · JPL
395970	2013 BC_{9}	—	January 16, 2004	Kitt Peak	Spacewatch	·	1.8 km	MPC · JPL
395971	2013 BT_{9}	—	February 20, 2009	Kitt Peak	Spacewatch	·	1.8 km	MPC · JPL
395972	2013 BV_{9}	—	August 29, 2006	Kitt Peak	Spacewatch	AGN	1.2 km	MPC · JPL
395973	2013 BM_{11}	—	February 26, 2009	Kitt Peak	Spacewatch	·	1.6 km	MPC · JPL
395974	2013 BT_{20}	—	November 17, 2004	Campo Imperatore	CINEOS	·	1.4 km	MPC · JPL
395975	2013 BB_{21}	—	November 17, 2006	Mount Lemmon	Mount Lemmon Survey	·	2.6 km	MPC · JPL
395976	2013 BC_{21}	—	October 30, 2007	Kitt Peak	Spacewatch	·	1.2 km	MPC · JPL
395977	2013 BU_{22}	—	December 16, 2007	Kitt Peak	Spacewatch	·	4.3 km	MPC · JPL
395978	2013 BL_{24}	—	March 2, 2009	Mount Lemmon	Mount Lemmon Survey	·	2.5 km	MPC · JPL
395979	2013 BR_{24}	—	September 20, 2011	Mount Lemmon	Mount Lemmon Survey	·	1.3 km	MPC · JPL
395980	2013 BY_{24}	—	September 18, 2003	Kitt Peak	Spacewatch	·	1.1 km	MPC · JPL
395981	2013 BT_{25}	—	February 10, 2002	Socorro	LINEAR	·	3.3 km	MPC · JPL
395982	2013 BY_{29}	—	February 28, 2009	Kitt Peak	Spacewatch	WIT	870 m	MPC · JPL
395983	2013 BV_{30}	—	May 1, 2009	Mount Lemmon	Mount Lemmon Survey	·	3.4 km	MPC · JPL
395984	2013 BV_{32}	—	November 3, 2007	Kitt Peak	Spacewatch	·	1.4 km	MPC · JPL
395985	2013 BK_{33}	—	April 17, 2005	Kitt Peak	Spacewatch	·	1.6 km	MPC · JPL
395986	2013 BR_{34}	—	September 13, 2005	Kitt Peak	Spacewatch	·	2.8 km	MPC · JPL
395987	2013 BW_{34}	—	January 17, 2009	Kitt Peak	Spacewatch	·	3.1 km	MPC · JPL
395988	2013 BC_{35}	—	April 14, 2008	Kitt Peak	Spacewatch	·	3.7 km	MPC · JPL
395989	2013 BQ_{35}	—	October 10, 2007	Kitt Peak	Spacewatch	·	1.5 km	MPC · JPL
395990	2013 BH_{36}	—	November 5, 2007	Kitt Peak	Spacewatch	NEM	2.3 km	MPC · JPL
395991	2013 BY_{37}	—	January 30, 2008	Catalina	CSS	EOS	2.8 km	MPC · JPL
395992	2013 BW_{39}	—	March 4, 2008	Kitt Peak	Spacewatch	·	3.1 km	MPC · JPL
395993	2013 BR_{40}	—	January 28, 2004	Kitt Peak	Spacewatch	·	2.2 km	MPC · JPL
395994	2013 BM_{41}	—	April 10, 2003	Kitt Peak	Spacewatch	·	2.8 km	MPC · JPL
395995	2013 BA_{42}	—	January 21, 2002	Kitt Peak	Spacewatch	·	3.2 km	MPC · JPL
395996	2013 BN_{42}	—	April 8, 2010	Mount Lemmon	Mount Lemmon Survey	·	2.2 km	MPC · JPL
395997	2013 BE_{43}	—	December 30, 2008	Mount Lemmon	Mount Lemmon Survey	·	2.4 km	MPC · JPL
395998	2013 BO_{46}	—	September 15, 2007	Mount Lemmon	Mount Lemmon Survey	·	1.6 km	MPC · JPL
395999	2013 BO_{48}	—	October 2, 2000	Socorro	LINEAR	NYS	1.3 km	MPC · JPL
396000	2013 BH_{55}	—	December 1, 2006	Mount Lemmon	Mount Lemmon Survey	CYB	3.6 km	MPC · JPL

back to top

== See also ==
- Meanings of minor-planet names: 395001–396000
