= List of minor planets: 394001–395000 =

The following is a partial list of minor planets, running from minor-planet number 394001 through 395000, inclusive. The primary data for this and other partial lists is based on JPL's "Small-Body Orbital Elements" and data available from the Minor Planet Center. Critical list information is also provided by the MPC, unless otherwise specified from Lowell Observatory. A detailed description of the table's columns and additional sources are given on the main page including a complete list of every page in this series, and a statistical break-up on the dynamical classification of minor planets.

Also see the summary list of all named bodies in numerical and alphabetical order, and the corresponding naming citations for the number range of this particular list. New namings may only be added to this list after official publication, as the preannouncement of names is condemned by the Working Group for Small Bodies Nomenclature of the International Astronomical Union.

Near-Earth obj.	MBA (inner)	MBA (outer)	Centaur
Mars-crosser	MBA (middle)	Jupiter trojan	Trans-Neptunian obj.
Unclassified

== 394001–394100 ==
Designation			Discovery			Properties		Ref
Permanent	Provisional	Named after	Date	Site	Discoverer(s)	Category	Diam.	Ref
394001	2005 UV_{516}	—	October 25, 2005	Apache Point	A. C. Becker	·	1.9 km	MPC · JPL
394002	2005 UT_{522}	—	October 27, 2005	Apache Point	A. C. Becker	·	1.7 km	MPC · JPL
394003	2005 UD_{523}	—	September 14, 2005	Kitt Peak	Spacewatch	·	2.5 km	MPC · JPL
394004	2005 UD_{530}	—	October 25, 2005	Kitt Peak	Spacewatch	·	3.7 km	MPC · JPL
394005	2005 VF_{1}	—	October 26, 2005	Kitt Peak	Spacewatch	·	960 m	MPC · JPL
394006	2005 VK_{4}	—	November 6, 2005	Mayhill	Lowe, A.	·	3.9 km	MPC · JPL
394007	2005 VF_{16}	—	October 10, 2005	Catalina	CSS	·	3.7 km	MPC · JPL
394008	2005 VL_{33}	—	November 1, 2005	Catalina	CSS	·	3.1 km	MPC · JPL
394009	2005 VV_{44}	—	October 29, 2005	Kitt Peak	Spacewatch	·	4.0 km	MPC · JPL
394010	2005 VE_{54}	—	October 22, 2005	Kitt Peak	Spacewatch	·	2.2 km	MPC · JPL
394011	2005 VW_{55}	—	October 28, 2005	Mount Lemmon	Mount Lemmon Survey	·	3.9 km	MPC · JPL
394012	2005 VA_{59}	—	November 5, 2005	Socorro	LINEAR	·	3.9 km	MPC · JPL
394013	2005 VY_{59}	—	November 5, 2005	Anderson Mesa	LONEOS	·	680 m	MPC · JPL
394014	2005 VG_{65}	—	November 1, 2005	Mount Lemmon	Mount Lemmon Survey	·	2.9 km	MPC · JPL
394015	2005 VH_{76}	—	November 3, 2005	Socorro	LINEAR	·	740 m	MPC · JPL
394016	2005 VO_{80}	—	October 22, 2005	Catalina	CSS	·	890 m	MPC · JPL
394017	2005 VO_{101}	—	November 2, 2005	Mount Lemmon	Mount Lemmon Survey	EUP	6.0 km	MPC · JPL
394018	2005 VU_{103}	—	November 2, 2005	Mount Lemmon	Mount Lemmon Survey	·	690 m	MPC · JPL
394019	2005 VE_{110}	—	November 6, 2005	Mount Lemmon	Mount Lemmon Survey	·	3.4 km	MPC · JPL
394020	2005 VD_{119}	—	November 4, 2005	Kitt Peak	Spacewatch	·	3.3 km	MPC · JPL
394021	2005 VZ_{125}	—	November 1, 2005	Apache Point	A. C. Becker	·	1.5 km	MPC · JPL
394022	2005 VP_{131}	—	November 1, 2005	Apache Point	A. C. Becker	·	2.4 km	MPC · JPL
394023	2005 WW_{9}	—	November 21, 2005	Kitt Peak	Spacewatch	·	820 m	MPC · JPL
394024	2005 WY_{10}	—	November 22, 2005	Kitt Peak	Spacewatch	·	2.9 km	MPC · JPL
394025	2005 WU_{12}	—	November 3, 2005	Kitt Peak	Spacewatch	·	3.9 km	MPC · JPL
394026	2005 WZ_{12}	—	November 22, 2005	Kitt Peak	Spacewatch	·	2.8 km	MPC · JPL
394027	2005 WG_{15}	—	November 22, 2005	Kitt Peak	Spacewatch	·	3.9 km	MPC · JPL
394028	2005 WE_{20}	—	November 21, 2005	Kitt Peak	Spacewatch	·	770 m	MPC · JPL
394029	2005 WQ_{22}	—	November 3, 2005	Kitt Peak	Spacewatch	·	1.0 km	MPC · JPL
394030	2005 WQ_{26}	—	November 21, 2005	Kitt Peak	Spacewatch	MAS	740 m	MPC · JPL
394031	2005 WS_{29}	—	November 21, 2005	Kitt Peak	Spacewatch	MAS	720 m	MPC · JPL
394032	2005 WQ_{39}	—	November 25, 2005	Mount Lemmon	Mount Lemmon Survey	·	830 m	MPC · JPL
394033	2005 WU_{52}	—	November 25, 2005	Mount Lemmon	Mount Lemmon Survey	·	3.0 km	MPC · JPL
394034	2005 WU_{59}	—	November 25, 2005	Palomar	NEAT	·	2.8 km	MPC · JPL
394035	2005 WL_{60}	—	October 27, 2005	Catalina	CSS	(1118)	4.9 km	MPC · JPL
394036	2005 WA_{69}	—	November 25, 2005	Mount Lemmon	Mount Lemmon Survey	·	790 m	MPC · JPL
394037	2005 WP_{76}	—	November 25, 2005	Kitt Peak	Spacewatch	URS	5.1 km	MPC · JPL
394038	2005 WE_{86}	—	November 28, 2005	Mount Lemmon	Mount Lemmon Survey	·	3.0 km	MPC · JPL
394039	2005 WP_{98}	—	November 28, 2005	Mount Lemmon	Mount Lemmon Survey	·	3.7 km	MPC · JPL
394040	2005 WD_{100}	—	November 1, 2005	Mount Lemmon	Mount Lemmon Survey	·	4.3 km	MPC · JPL
394041	2005 WY_{101}	—	November 29, 2005	Socorro	LINEAR	ERI	2.1 km	MPC · JPL
394042	2005 WX_{102}	—	November 25, 2005	Catalina	CSS	·	840 m	MPC · JPL
394043	2005 WS_{112}	—	June 20, 2004	Kitt Peak	Spacewatch	·	4.7 km	MPC · JPL
394044	2005 WO_{117}	—	November 28, 2005	Socorro	LINEAR	·	5.3 km	MPC · JPL
394045	2005 WS_{118}	—	November 25, 2005	Kitt Peak	Spacewatch	·	5.5 km	MPC · JPL
394046	2005 WX_{119}	—	November 29, 2005	Anderson Mesa	LONEOS	·	5.1 km	MPC · JPL
394047	2005 WC_{141}	—	November 28, 2005	Mount Lemmon	Mount Lemmon Survey	EOS	2.0 km	MPC · JPL
394048	2005 WV_{146}	—	November 25, 2005	Kitt Peak	Spacewatch	·	970 m	MPC · JPL
394049	2005 WE_{148}	—	November 26, 2005	Kitt Peak	Spacewatch	·	1.4 km	MPC · JPL
394050	2005 WQ_{163}	—	November 21, 2005	Kitt Peak	Spacewatch	·	880 m	MPC · JPL
394051	2005 WR_{163}	—	November 29, 2005	Kitt Peak	Spacewatch	·	730 m	MPC · JPL
394052	2005 WU_{186}	—	November 29, 2005	Kitt Peak	Spacewatch	·	3.3 km	MPC · JPL
394053	2005 WT_{187}	—	November 29, 2005	Kitt Peak	Spacewatch	·	860 m	MPC · JPL
394054	2005 WL_{188}	—	November 30, 2005	Kitt Peak	Spacewatch	·	930 m	MPC · JPL
394055	2005 WU_{191}	—	November 25, 2005	Catalina	CSS	·	1.3 km	MPC · JPL
394056	2005 WW_{200}	—	November 26, 2005	Kitt Peak	Spacewatch	·	2.6 km	MPC · JPL
394057	2005 WD_{209}	—	November 30, 2005	Kitt Peak	Spacewatch	(2076)	1.1 km	MPC · JPL
394058	2005 XF	—	December 1, 2005	Junk Bond	D. Healy	·	2.5 km	MPC · JPL
394059	2005 XB_{5}	—	December 6, 2005	Cordell-Lorenz	Cordell-Lorenz	·	890 m	MPC · JPL
394060	2005 XB_{8}	—	December 4, 2005	Mount Lemmon	Mount Lemmon Survey	·	5.6 km	MPC · JPL
394061	2005 XG_{28}	—	December 1, 2005	Catalina	CSS	·	770 m	MPC · JPL
394062	2005 XO_{51}	—	December 2, 2005	Kitt Peak	Spacewatch	·	2.9 km	MPC · JPL
394063	2005 XP_{54}	—	November 25, 2005	Kitt Peak	Spacewatch	·	810 m	MPC · JPL
394064	2005 XS_{54}	—	December 5, 2005	Kitt Peak	Spacewatch	·	2.6 km	MPC · JPL
394065	2005 XW_{60}	—	December 4, 2005	Kitt Peak	Spacewatch	CYB	3.5 km	MPC · JPL
394066	2005 XU_{77}	—	December 10, 2005	Socorro	LINEAR	T_{j} (2.95)	4.5 km	MPC · JPL
394067	2005 YH_{80}	—	December 24, 2005	Kitt Peak	Spacewatch	·	940 m	MPC · JPL
394068	2005 YZ_{111}	—	December 25, 2005	Mount Lemmon	Mount Lemmon Survey	·	950 m	MPC · JPL
394069	2005 YT_{121}	—	December 28, 2005	Mount Lemmon	Mount Lemmon Survey	·	700 m	MPC · JPL
394070	2005 YW_{146}	—	December 29, 2005	Mount Lemmon	Mount Lemmon Survey	·	850 m	MPC · JPL
394071	2005 YB_{153}	—	December 28, 2005	Mount Lemmon	Mount Lemmon Survey	·	1.5 km	MPC · JPL
394072	2005 YY_{161}	—	December 27, 2005	Kitt Peak	Spacewatch	·	2.9 km	MPC · JPL
394073	2005 YN_{168}	—	December 29, 2005	Kitt Peak	Spacewatch	NYS	920 m	MPC · JPL
394074	2005 YP_{176}	—	December 22, 2005	Kitt Peak	Spacewatch	·	1.6 km	MPC · JPL
394075	2005 YZ_{187}	—	December 28, 2005	Kitt Peak	Spacewatch	·	2.1 km	MPC · JPL
394076	2005 YN_{200}	—	December 22, 2005	Kitt Peak	Spacewatch	·	1.2 km	MPC · JPL
394077	2005 YC_{203}	—	December 25, 2005	Kitt Peak	Spacewatch	MAS	570 m	MPC · JPL
394078	2005 YF_{231}	—	December 7, 2005	Kitt Peak	Spacewatch	MAS	600 m	MPC · JPL
394079	2005 YT_{271}	—	December 28, 2005	Mount Lemmon	Mount Lemmon Survey	·	1.2 km	MPC · JPL
394080	2005 YL_{277}	—	December 25, 2005	Kitt Peak	Spacewatch	·	1.1 km	MPC · JPL
394081	2006 AS_{30}	—	January 4, 2006	Kitt Peak	Spacewatch	·	3.8 km	MPC · JPL
394082	2006 AX_{58}	—	January 4, 2006	Mount Lemmon	Mount Lemmon Survey	·	930 m	MPC · JPL
394083	2006 AZ_{92}	—	January 7, 2006	Kitt Peak	Spacewatch	·	1.6 km	MPC · JPL
394084	2006 BO_{5}	—	January 21, 2006	Anderson Mesa	LONEOS	H	700 m	MPC · JPL
394085	2006 BY_{9}	—	January 20, 2006	Kitt Peak	Spacewatch	NYS	1.2 km	MPC · JPL
394086	2006 BP_{12}	—	January 21, 2006	Kitt Peak	Spacewatch	·	1.3 km	MPC · JPL
394087	2006 BU_{28}	—	January 22, 2006	Mount Lemmon	Mount Lemmon Survey	·	1 km	MPC · JPL
394088	2006 BP_{34}	—	January 22, 2006	Mount Lemmon	Mount Lemmon Survey	·	1.3 km	MPC · JPL
394089	2006 BF_{36}	—	December 28, 2005	Mount Lemmon	Mount Lemmon Survey	CYB	4.2 km	MPC · JPL
394090	2006 BK_{41}	—	January 22, 2006	Mount Lemmon	Mount Lemmon Survey	V	890 m	MPC · JPL
394091	2006 BT_{44}	—	January 23, 2006	Mount Lemmon	Mount Lemmon Survey	·	1.2 km	MPC · JPL
394092	2006 BH_{46}	—	January 23, 2006	Mount Lemmon	Mount Lemmon Survey	·	1.5 km	MPC · JPL
394093	2006 BQ_{48}	—	January 25, 2006	Kitt Peak	Spacewatch	MAS	670 m	MPC · JPL
394094	2006 BA_{64}	—	January 22, 2006	Catalina	CSS	·	1.1 km	MPC · JPL
394095	2006 BX_{66}	—	January 23, 2006	Kitt Peak	Spacewatch	·	1.5 km	MPC · JPL
394096	2006 BD_{74}	—	January 23, 2006	Kitt Peak	Spacewatch	·	1.4 km	MPC · JPL
394097	2006 BU_{74}	—	January 23, 2006	Kitt Peak	Spacewatch	NYS	980 m	MPC · JPL
394098	2006 BK_{107}	—	January 25, 2006	Kitt Peak	Spacewatch	·	1.3 km	MPC · JPL
394099	2006 BZ_{110}	—	January 25, 2006	Kitt Peak	Spacewatch	·	1.1 km	MPC · JPL
394100	2006 BS_{111}	—	January 25, 2006	Kitt Peak	Spacewatch	·	1.1 km	MPC · JPL

== 394101–394200 ==
back to top

Designation			Discovery			Properties		Ref
Permanent	Provisional	Named after	Date	Site	Discoverer(s)	Category	Diam.	Ref
394101	2006 BY_{113}	—	January 25, 2006	Kitt Peak	Spacewatch	·	1.2 km	MPC · JPL
394102	2006 BC_{136}	—	December 1, 2005	Kitt Peak	Spacewatch	·	1.5 km	MPC · JPL
394103	2006 BP_{137}	—	January 28, 2006	Mount Lemmon	Mount Lemmon Survey	NYS	960 m	MPC · JPL
394104	2006 BR_{158}	—	January 26, 2006	Anderson Mesa	LONEOS	H	670 m	MPC · JPL
394105	2006 BT_{178}	—	January 27, 2006	Mount Lemmon	Mount Lemmon Survey	·	950 m	MPC · JPL
394106	2006 BW_{185}	—	January 28, 2006	Mount Lemmon	Mount Lemmon Survey	NYS	780 m	MPC · JPL
394107	2006 BV_{194}	—	January 30, 2006	Kitt Peak	Spacewatch	·	1.0 km	MPC · JPL
394108	2006 CY_{5}	—	February 1, 2006	Mount Lemmon	Mount Lemmon Survey	NYS	1.1 km	MPC · JPL
394109	2006 CD_{7}	—	February 1, 2006	Mount Lemmon	Mount Lemmon Survey	·	1.2 km	MPC · JPL
394110	2006 CX_{41}	—	February 2, 2006	Kitt Peak	Spacewatch	·	1.3 km	MPC · JPL
394111	2006 CV_{56}	—	February 4, 2006	Catalina	CSS	H	730 m	MPC · JPL
394112	2006 DD_{4}	—	February 20, 2006	Catalina	CSS	H	630 m	MPC · JPL
394113	2006 DE_{5}	—	October 9, 2004	Kitt Peak	Spacewatch	·	1.3 km	MPC · JPL
394114	2006 DD_{16}	—	January 23, 2006	Kitt Peak	Spacewatch	NYS	950 m	MPC · JPL
394115	2006 DQ_{25}	—	February 20, 2006	Kitt Peak	Spacewatch	·	830 m	MPC · JPL
394116	2006 DB_{170}	—	February 27, 2006	Kitt Peak	Spacewatch	·	1.4 km	MPC · JPL
394117	2006 DG_{184}	—	February 27, 2006	Kitt Peak	Spacewatch	·	1.2 km	MPC · JPL
394118	2006 DC_{191}	—	September 9, 1999	Socorro	LINEAR	H	620 m	MPC · JPL
394119	2006 EV_{15}	—	March 2, 2006	Kitt Peak	Spacewatch	3:2	6.2 km	MPC · JPL
394120	2006 EB_{25}	—	March 3, 2006	Kitt Peak	Spacewatch	NYS	770 m	MPC · JPL
394121	2006 EQ_{48}	—	March 4, 2006	Kitt Peak	Spacewatch	·	1.3 km	MPC · JPL
394122	2006 FT_{13}	—	March 23, 2006	Kitt Peak	Spacewatch	·	1.0 km	MPC · JPL
394123	2006 FA_{16}	—	March 23, 2006	Mount Lemmon	Mount Lemmon Survey	·	860 m	MPC · JPL
394124	2006 FN_{28}	—	March 24, 2006	Mount Lemmon	Mount Lemmon Survey	·	1.2 km	MPC · JPL
394125	2006 GZ_{25}	—	March 25, 2006	Kitt Peak	Spacewatch	3:2 · SHU	5.4 km	MPC · JPL
394126	2006 GR_{41}	—	April 7, 2006	Anderson Mesa	LONEOS	H	630 m	MPC · JPL
394127	2006 GW_{54}	—	April 9, 2006	Kitt Peak	Spacewatch	V	740 m	MPC · JPL
394128	2006 HR_{33}	—	April 19, 2006	Mount Lemmon	Mount Lemmon Survey	·	1.4 km	MPC · JPL
394129	2006 HJ_{48}	—	April 24, 2006	Kitt Peak	Spacewatch	·	2.5 km	MPC · JPL
394130	2006 HY_{51}	—	April 26, 2006	Socorro	LINEAR	T_{j} (2.3) · APO +1km	1.2 km	MPC · JPL
394131	2006 HV_{62}	—	April 8, 2006	Kitt Peak	Spacewatch	3:2 · SHU	5.3 km	MPC · JPL
394132	2006 HT_{75}	—	April 25, 2006	Kitt Peak	Spacewatch	·	950 m	MPC · JPL
394133	2006 HE_{152}	—	April 19, 2006	Kitt Peak	Spacewatch	H	550 m	MPC · JPL
394134	2006 JA_{2}	—	May 1, 2006	Socorro	LINEAR	·	1.1 km	MPC · JPL
394135	2006 JA_{14}	—	May 4, 2006	Kitt Peak	Spacewatch	·	1.3 km	MPC · JPL
394136	2006 JA_{35}	—	May 4, 2006	Kitt Peak	Spacewatch	(5)	1.1 km	MPC · JPL
394137	2006 JQ_{46}	—	May 7, 2006	Kitt Peak	Spacewatch	·	2.1 km	MPC · JPL
394138	2006 KF_{23}	—	May 21, 2006	Palomar	NEAT	·	1.3 km	MPC · JPL
394139	2006 KW_{27}	—	May 20, 2006	Kitt Peak	Spacewatch	·	1.1 km	MPC · JPL
394140	2006 KU_{30}	—	May 20, 2006	Kitt Peak	Spacewatch	(5)	1.0 km	MPC · JPL
394141	2006 KV_{38}	—	May 24, 2006	Siding Spring	SSS	·	1.6 km	MPC · JPL
394142	2006 KT_{55}	—	May 21, 2006	Kitt Peak	Spacewatch	EUN	1.1 km	MPC · JPL
394143	2006 KO_{71}	—	May 22, 2006	Kitt Peak	Spacewatch	·	1.1 km	MPC · JPL
394144	2006 KF_{74}	—	May 23, 2006	Kitt Peak	Spacewatch	·	1.3 km	MPC · JPL
394145	2006 KG_{80}	—	May 9, 2006	Mount Lemmon	Mount Lemmon Survey	·	1.2 km	MPC · JPL
394146	2006 KO_{85}	—	May 2, 2006	Catalina	CSS	H	700 m	MPC · JPL
394147	2006 KZ_{92}	—	May 25, 2006	Kitt Peak	Spacewatch	·	920 m	MPC · JPL
394148	2006 KT_{99}	—	May 28, 2006	Kitt Peak	Spacewatch	·	1.5 km	MPC · JPL
394149	2006 KA_{104}	—	May 6, 2006	Mount Lemmon	Mount Lemmon Survey	·	960 m	MPC · JPL
394150	2006 KW_{115}	—	May 29, 2006	Kitt Peak	Spacewatch	·	910 m	MPC · JPL
394151	2006 LF_{1}	—	June 1, 2006	Kitt Peak	Spacewatch	·	1.0 km	MPC · JPL
394152	2006 ON_{21}	—	July 28, 2006	Siding Spring	SSS	·	2.9 km	MPC · JPL
394153	2006 PL_{14}	—	August 15, 2006	Palomar	NEAT	·	1.7 km	MPC · JPL
394154	2006 PH_{20}	—	July 18, 2006	Siding Spring	SSS	·	1.9 km	MPC · JPL
394155	2006 QS	—	August 18, 2006	Socorro	LINEAR	AMO · critical	350 m	MPC · JPL
394156	2006 QX_{6}	—	August 17, 2006	Palomar	NEAT	·	1.2 km	MPC · JPL
394157	2006 QR_{16}	—	August 17, 2006	Palomar	NEAT	·	1.4 km	MPC · JPL
394158	2006 QZ_{20}	—	August 18, 2006	Anderson Mesa	LONEOS	JUN	1.3 km	MPC · JPL
394159	2006 QJ_{38}	—	August 18, 2006	Socorro	LINEAR	·	2.6 km	MPC · JPL
394160	2006 QD_{43}	—	August 17, 2006	Palomar	NEAT	·	2.6 km	MPC · JPL
394161	2006 QF_{51}	—	August 23, 2006	Socorro	LINEAR	·	2.1 km	MPC · JPL
394162	2006 QD_{58}	—	August 25, 2006	Socorro	LINEAR	·	3.0 km	MPC · JPL
394163	2006 QN_{68}	—	August 21, 2006	Kitt Peak	Spacewatch	·	1.8 km	MPC · JPL
394164	2006 QV_{85}	—	August 27, 2006	Kitt Peak	Spacewatch	AEO	1.2 km	MPC · JPL
394165	2006 QW_{90}	—	December 1, 1994	Kitt Peak	Spacewatch	·	1.5 km	MPC · JPL
394166	2006 QQ_{92}	—	August 16, 2006	Palomar	NEAT	·	1.9 km	MPC · JPL
394167	2006 QL_{95}	—	August 16, 2006	Palomar	NEAT	·	1.9 km	MPC · JPL
394168	2006 QT_{96}	—	August 16, 2006	Palomar	NEAT	·	1.7 km	MPC · JPL
394169	2006 QW_{104}	—	August 28, 2006	Socorro	LINEAR	EUN	1.5 km	MPC · JPL
394170	2006 QZ_{113}	—	August 25, 2006	Socorro	LINEAR	·	2.3 km	MPC · JPL
394171	2006 QK_{152}	—	August 19, 2006	Kitt Peak	Spacewatch	·	1.7 km	MPC · JPL
394172	2006 QR_{156}	—	August 19, 2006	Kitt Peak	Spacewatch	·	1.7 km	MPC · JPL
394173	2006 QR_{164}	—	August 29, 2006	Anderson Mesa	LONEOS	(194)	1.9 km	MPC · JPL
394174	2006 QJ_{165}	—	August 29, 2006	Catalina	CSS	·	2.2 km	MPC · JPL
394175	2006 QN_{185}	—	August 18, 2006	Kitt Peak	Spacewatch	·	2.0 km	MPC · JPL
394176	2006 RS_{8}	—	September 12, 2006	Catalina	CSS	·	1.4 km	MPC · JPL
394177	2006 RM_{10}	—	September 14, 2006	Palomar	NEAT	·	1.9 km	MPC · JPL
394178	2006 RU_{46}	—	September 14, 2006	Kitt Peak	Spacewatch	·	1.8 km	MPC · JPL
394179	2006 RT_{54}	—	September 14, 2006	Kitt Peak	Spacewatch	·	1.9 km	MPC · JPL
394180	2006 RT_{59}	—	September 15, 2006	Kitt Peak	Spacewatch	AGN	1.2 km	MPC · JPL
394181	2006 RV_{61}	—	September 12, 2006	Catalina	CSS	·	2.8 km	MPC · JPL
394182	2006 RO_{70}	—	September 15, 2006	Kitt Peak	Spacewatch	EOS	2.4 km	MPC · JPL
394183	2006 RM_{76}	—	September 15, 2006	Kitt Peak	Spacewatch	·	1.9 km	MPC · JPL
394184	2006 RJ_{92}	—	September 15, 2006	Kitt Peak	Spacewatch	AGN	1.3 km	MPC · JPL
394185	2006 RN_{93}	—	September 15, 2006	Kitt Peak	Spacewatch	·	2.0 km	MPC · JPL
394186	2006 RY_{98}	—	September 14, 2006	Catalina	CSS	·	1.9 km	MPC · JPL
394187	2006 SM_{1}	—	April 10, 2005	Mount Lemmon	Mount Lemmon Survey	·	1.6 km	MPC · JPL
394188	2006 SL_{7}	—	September 18, 2006	Mayhill	Lowe, A.	·	1.9 km	MPC · JPL
394189	2006 SM_{10}	—	September 16, 2006	Kitt Peak	Spacewatch	·	2.0 km	MPC · JPL
394190	2006 ST_{36}	—	September 17, 2006	Kitt Peak	Spacewatch	·	2.1 km	MPC · JPL
394191	2006 SY_{51}	—	September 18, 2006	Catalina	CSS	·	2.4 km	MPC · JPL
394192	2006 SB_{55}	—	September 18, 2006	Catalina	CSS	·	1.3 km	MPC · JPL
394193	2006 SX_{58}	—	September 20, 2006	Catalina	CSS	·	1.9 km	MPC · JPL
394194	2006 SA_{60}	—	September 18, 2006	Catalina	CSS	JUN	1.3 km	MPC · JPL
394195	2006 SV_{60}	—	September 18, 2006	Catalina	CSS	·	1.7 km	MPC · JPL
394196	2006 SH_{66}	—	September 23, 2001	Kitt Peak	Spacewatch	KOR	1.7 km	MPC · JPL
394197	2006 SZ_{69}	—	September 19, 2006	Kitt Peak	Spacewatch	KOR	1.2 km	MPC · JPL
394198	2006 SY_{72}	—	September 19, 2006	Kitt Peak	Spacewatch	·	2.1 km	MPC · JPL
394199	2006 SS_{84}	—	September 18, 2006	Kitt Peak	Spacewatch	MRX	1 km	MPC · JPL
394200	2006 SF_{85}	—	September 18, 2006	Kitt Peak	Spacewatch	·	1.9 km	MPC · JPL

== 394201–394300 ==
back to top

Designation			Discovery			Properties		Ref
Permanent	Provisional	Named after	Date	Site	Discoverer(s)	Category	Diam.	Ref
394201	2006 SV_{91}	—	September 18, 2006	Kitt Peak	Spacewatch	·	2.6 km	MPC · JPL
394202	2006 SY_{102}	—	September 19, 2006	Kitt Peak	Spacewatch	·	1.4 km	MPC · JPL
394203	2006 SB_{104}	—	September 19, 2006	Catalina	CSS	·	3.4 km	MPC · JPL
394204	2006 SM_{105}	—	September 19, 2006	Kitt Peak	Spacewatch	(1547)	1.1 km	MPC · JPL
394205	2006 SZ_{107}	—	September 19, 2006	Anderson Mesa	LONEOS	·	1.9 km	MPC · JPL
394206	2006 SK_{167}	—	September 25, 2006	Kitt Peak	Spacewatch	·	2.7 km	MPC · JPL
394207	2006 SN_{186}	—	September 25, 2006	Kitt Peak	Spacewatch	·	2.2 km	MPC · JPL
394208	2006 SL_{188}	—	September 26, 2006	Kitt Peak	Spacewatch	·	2.0 km	MPC · JPL
394209	2006 SC_{199}	—	April 13, 2004	Kitt Peak	Spacewatch	·	1.7 km	MPC · JPL
394210	2006 SN_{221}	—	August 28, 2006	Kitt Peak	Spacewatch	·	1.8 km	MPC · JPL
394211	2006 SW_{224}	—	September 26, 2006	Kitt Peak	Spacewatch	·	2.3 km	MPC · JPL
394212	2006 SQ_{226}	—	September 18, 2006	Kitt Peak	Spacewatch	·	2.3 km	MPC · JPL
394213	2006 SZ_{233}	—	September 26, 2006	Kitt Peak	Spacewatch	·	1.8 km	MPC · JPL
394214	2006 SH_{244}	—	September 18, 2006	Kitt Peak	Spacewatch	KOR	1.2 km	MPC · JPL
394215	2006 SY_{250}	—	September 26, 2006	Kitt Peak	Spacewatch	KOR	1.2 km	MPC · JPL
394216	2006 SG_{262}	—	September 26, 2006	Mount Lemmon	Mount Lemmon Survey	·	2.3 km	MPC · JPL
394217	2006 SF_{266}	—	September 26, 2006	Kitt Peak	Spacewatch	·	2.9 km	MPC · JPL
394218	2006 SW_{269}	—	September 26, 2006	Mount Lemmon	Mount Lemmon Survey	EOS	1.7 km	MPC · JPL
394219	2006 SM_{284}	—	September 27, 2006	Catalina	CSS	EUN	1.6 km	MPC · JPL
394220	2006 SO_{293}	—	September 17, 2006	Kitt Peak	Spacewatch	·	1.8 km	MPC · JPL
394221	2006 SH_{302}	—	September 27, 2006	Kitt Peak	Spacewatch	·	1.6 km	MPC · JPL
394222	2006 SQ_{309}	—	September 27, 2006	Kitt Peak	Spacewatch	AGN	1.1 km	MPC · JPL
394223	2006 ST_{311}	—	September 27, 2006	Kitt Peak	Spacewatch	·	1.8 km	MPC · JPL
394224	2006 SF_{315}	—	September 27, 2006	Kitt Peak	Spacewatch	HOF	2.3 km	MPC · JPL
394225	2006 SK_{325}	—	September 27, 2006	Kitt Peak	Spacewatch	·	1.5 km	MPC · JPL
394226	2006 SH_{327}	—	September 27, 2006	Kitt Peak	Spacewatch	·	2.0 km	MPC · JPL
394227	2006 SN_{327}	—	September 27, 2006	Kitt Peak	Spacewatch	·	1.8 km	MPC · JPL
394228	2006 ST_{341}	—	September 28, 2006	Mount Lemmon	Mount Lemmon Survey	·	3.3 km	MPC · JPL
394229	2006 SH_{348}	—	September 28, 2006	Kitt Peak	Spacewatch	KOR	1.2 km	MPC · JPL
394230	2006 SW_{348}	—	September 28, 2006	Kitt Peak	Spacewatch	·	2.2 km	MPC · JPL
394231	2006 SF_{358}	—	September 30, 2006	Mount Lemmon	Mount Lemmon Survey	·	2.2 km	MPC · JPL
394232	2006 SK_{358}	—	September 15, 2006	Kitt Peak	Spacewatch	HOF	2.9 km	MPC · JPL
394233	2006 SC_{359}	—	September 30, 2006	Catalina	CSS	·	1.5 km	MPC · JPL
394234	2006 SA_{375}	—	September 16, 2006	Apache Point	A. C. Becker	·	1.9 km	MPC · JPL
394235	2006 SW_{393}	—	September 30, 2006	Mount Lemmon	Mount Lemmon Survey	(13314)	1.9 km	MPC · JPL
394236	2006 SS_{397}	—	September 25, 2006	Mount Lemmon	Mount Lemmon Survey	·	1.9 km	MPC · JPL
394237	2006 SN_{404}	—	September 30, 2006	Mount Lemmon	Mount Lemmon Survey	·	2.3 km	MPC · JPL
394238	2006 SQ_{404}	—	September 30, 2006	Mount Lemmon	Mount Lemmon Survey	·	2.5 km	MPC · JPL
394239	2006 SA_{405}	—	September 30, 2006	Mount Lemmon	Mount Lemmon Survey	·	1.8 km	MPC · JPL
394240	2006 SY_{405}	—	September 17, 2006	Kitt Peak	Spacewatch	·	1.6 km	MPC · JPL
394241	2006 SZ_{410}	—	May 20, 2005	Mount Lemmon	Mount Lemmon Survey	·	1.9 km	MPC · JPL
394242	2006 TU_{13}	—	October 10, 2006	Palomar	NEAT	·	3.3 km	MPC · JPL
394243	2006 TG_{29}	—	October 12, 2006	Kitt Peak	Spacewatch	·	1.8 km	MPC · JPL
394244	2006 TF_{38}	—	October 12, 2006	Kitt Peak	Spacewatch	·	2.4 km	MPC · JPL
394245	2006 TW_{60}	—	October 15, 2006	Bergisch Gladbach	W. Bickel	·	3.1 km	MPC · JPL
394246	2006 TO_{69}	—	September 25, 2006	Catalina	CSS	·	2.6 km	MPC · JPL
394247	2006 TQ_{77}	—	October 12, 2006	Kitt Peak	Spacewatch	·	2.0 km	MPC · JPL
394248	2006 TN_{85}	—	October 2, 2006	Mount Lemmon	Mount Lemmon Survey	EOS	2.0 km	MPC · JPL
394249	2006 TO_{104}	—	October 15, 2006	Kitt Peak	Spacewatch	615	1.6 km	MPC · JPL
394250	2006 TN_{112}	—	October 1, 2006	Apache Point	A. C. Becker	·	1.9 km	MPC · JPL
394251	2006 TK_{120}	—	October 12, 2006	Apache Point	A. C. Becker	BRA	1.2 km	MPC · JPL
394252	2006 TV_{121}	—	October 3, 2006	Mount Lemmon	Mount Lemmon Survey	·	3.2 km	MPC · JPL
394253	2006 TU_{124}	—	October 4, 2006	Mount Lemmon	Mount Lemmon Survey	·	2.0 km	MPC · JPL
394254	2006 TR_{128}	—	October 2, 2006	Kitt Peak	Spacewatch	AGN	1.2 km	MPC · JPL
394255	2006 UX_{21}	—	September 25, 2006	Kitt Peak	Spacewatch	·	3.1 km	MPC · JPL
394256	2006 UV_{24}	—	October 16, 2006	Kitt Peak	Spacewatch	EOS	1.9 km	MPC · JPL
394257	2006 UH_{39}	—	October 16, 2006	Kitt Peak	Spacewatch	·	2.1 km	MPC · JPL
394258	2006 UX_{43}	—	October 16, 2006	Kitt Peak	Spacewatch	KOR	1.4 km	MPC · JPL
394259	2006 UE_{48}	—	October 17, 2006	Kitt Peak	Spacewatch	·	2.2 km	MPC · JPL
394260	2006 UH_{62}	—	September 27, 2006	Mount Lemmon	Mount Lemmon Survey	·	2.0 km	MPC · JPL
394261	2006 UV_{70}	—	July 22, 2006	Mount Lemmon	Mount Lemmon Survey	·	2.4 km	MPC · JPL
394262	2006 UW_{72}	—	October 17, 2006	Kitt Peak	Spacewatch	EOS	1.9 km	MPC · JPL
394263	2006 UA_{95}	—	October 3, 2006	Mount Lemmon	Mount Lemmon Survey	HOF	2.4 km	MPC · JPL
394264	2006 UZ_{104}	—	October 18, 2006	Kitt Peak	Spacewatch	(13314)	2.4 km	MPC · JPL
394265	2006 UY_{111}	—	October 19, 2006	Kitt Peak	Spacewatch	·	2.7 km	MPC · JPL
394266	2006 UK_{114}	—	October 19, 2006	Kitt Peak	Spacewatch	·	2.0 km	MPC · JPL
394267	2006 UR_{115}	—	October 11, 2006	Kitt Peak	Spacewatch	·	2.7 km	MPC · JPL
394268	2006 UF_{118}	—	October 19, 2006	Kitt Peak	Spacewatch	·	2.1 km	MPC · JPL
394269	2006 UP_{119}	—	October 19, 2006	Kitt Peak	Spacewatch	KOR	1.3 km	MPC · JPL
394270	2006 UO_{120}	—	October 19, 2006	Kitt Peak	Spacewatch	·	1.7 km	MPC · JPL
394271	2006 UY_{125}	—	October 19, 2006	Kitt Peak	Spacewatch	·	2.4 km	MPC · JPL
394272	2006 UA_{133}	—	October 19, 2006	Kitt Peak	Spacewatch	·	2.2 km	MPC · JPL
394273	2006 US_{135}	—	September 30, 2006	Mount Lemmon	Mount Lemmon Survey	·	2.0 km	MPC · JPL
394274	2006 UW_{143}	—	October 19, 2006	Catalina	CSS	·	3.3 km	MPC · JPL
394275	2006 UX_{188}	—	September 17, 2006	Catalina	CSS	526	2.8 km	MPC · JPL
394276	2006 UG_{194}	—	October 12, 2006	Kitt Peak	Spacewatch	·	1.9 km	MPC · JPL
394277	2006 UY_{217}	—	August 29, 2006	Catalina	CSS	·	3.4 km	MPC · JPL
394278	2006 UU_{228}	—	October 2, 2006	Mount Lemmon	Mount Lemmon Survey	·	2.8 km	MPC · JPL
394279	2006 UN_{248}	—	October 27, 2006	Mount Lemmon	Mount Lemmon Survey	·	2.8 km	MPC · JPL
394280	2006 UD_{260}	—	October 28, 2006	Kitt Peak	Spacewatch	KOR	1.4 km	MPC · JPL
394281	2006 UO_{276}	—	October 28, 2006	Mount Lemmon	Mount Lemmon Survey	EOS	1.9 km	MPC · JPL
394282	2006 UE_{279}	—	October 28, 2006	Mount Lemmon	Mount Lemmon Survey	·	1.8 km	MPC · JPL
394283	2006 UU_{280}	—	April 22, 2004	Kitt Peak	Spacewatch	·	2.1 km	MPC · JPL
394284	2006 UF_{284}	—	October 28, 2006	Kitt Peak	Spacewatch	DOR	2.1 km	MPC · JPL
394285	2006 UA_{285}	—	October 28, 2006	Kitt Peak	Spacewatch	(13314)	2.0 km	MPC · JPL
394286	2006 UW_{325}	—	October 20, 2006	Kitt Peak	M. W. Buie	·	3.0 km	MPC · JPL
394287	2006 UZ_{336}	—	October 23, 2006	Mount Lemmon	Mount Lemmon Survey	·	2.8 km	MPC · JPL
394288	2006 VY_{16}	—	November 9, 2006	Kitt Peak	Spacewatch	·	1.8 km	MPC · JPL
394289	2006 VJ_{21}	—	November 10, 2006	Kitt Peak	Spacewatch	·	1.5 km	MPC · JPL
394290	2006 VF_{28}	—	November 10, 2006	Kitt Peak	Spacewatch	·	2.9 km	MPC · JPL
394291	2006 VW_{29}	—	November 10, 2006	Kitt Peak	Spacewatch	·	2.8 km	MPC · JPL
394292	2006 VM_{34}	—	September 28, 2006	Mount Lemmon	Mount Lemmon Survey	·	3.0 km	MPC · JPL
394293	2006 VJ_{35}	—	October 27, 2006	Mount Lemmon	Mount Lemmon Survey	·	2.1 km	MPC · JPL
394294	2006 VB_{41}	—	November 12, 2006	Mount Lemmon	Mount Lemmon Survey	THM	2.1 km	MPC · JPL
394295	2006 VZ_{58}	—	November 11, 2006	Kitt Peak	Spacewatch	EOS	2.0 km	MPC · JPL
394296	2006 VW_{70}	—	November 11, 2006	Kitt Peak	Spacewatch	BRA	1.5 km	MPC · JPL
394297	2006 VD_{73}	—	November 11, 2006	Kitt Peak	Spacewatch	·	3.4 km	MPC · JPL
394298	2006 VD_{83}	—	October 4, 2006	Mount Lemmon	Mount Lemmon Survey	EOS	2.0 km	MPC · JPL
394299	2006 VF_{98}	—	October 28, 2006	Mount Lemmon	Mount Lemmon Survey	TIR	2.6 km	MPC · JPL
394300	2006 VT_{110}	—	September 28, 2006	Mount Lemmon	Mount Lemmon Survey	·	2.3 km	MPC · JPL

== 394301–394400 ==
back to top

Designation			Discovery			Properties		Ref
Permanent	Provisional	Named after	Date	Site	Discoverer(s)	Category	Diam.	Ref
394301	2006 VA_{126}	—	September 26, 2006	Mount Lemmon	Mount Lemmon Survey	EOS	1.7 km	MPC · JPL
394302	2006 VX_{131}	—	January 22, 2002	Kitt Peak	Spacewatch	THM	2.2 km	MPC · JPL
394303	2006 VJ_{134}	—	October 21, 2006	Mount Lemmon	Mount Lemmon Survey	·	2.3 km	MPC · JPL
394304	2006 VR_{139}	—	November 15, 2006	Kitt Peak	Spacewatch	·	2.4 km	MPC · JPL
394305	2006 VG_{146}	—	November 15, 2006	Catalina	CSS	·	2.4 km	MPC · JPL
394306	2006 VL_{146}	—	April 5, 2003	Kitt Peak	Spacewatch	EOS	2.0 km	MPC · JPL
394307	2006 VO_{153}	—	October 3, 2006	Mount Lemmon	Mount Lemmon Survey	·	2.4 km	MPC · JPL
394308	2006 VY_{169}	—	November 11, 2006	Kitt Peak	Spacewatch	THM	2.6 km	MPC · JPL
394309	2006 WY_{5}	—	November 16, 2006	Kitt Peak	Spacewatch	·	2.0 km	MPC · JPL
394310	2006 WA_{10}	—	November 16, 2006	Mount Lemmon	Mount Lemmon Survey	·	3.4 km	MPC · JPL
394311	2006 WP_{12}	—	November 16, 2006	Mount Lemmon	Mount Lemmon Survey	·	2.8 km	MPC · JPL
394312	2006 WC_{16}	—	October 4, 2006	Mount Lemmon	Mount Lemmon Survey	EOS	1.7 km	MPC · JPL
394313	2006 WV_{16}	—	September 27, 2006	Mount Lemmon	Mount Lemmon Survey	·	2.8 km	MPC · JPL
394314	2006 WS_{21}	—	November 17, 2006	Mount Lemmon	Mount Lemmon Survey	EOS	2.1 km	MPC · JPL
394315	2006 WZ_{33}	—	October 23, 2006	Mount Lemmon	Mount Lemmon Survey	EOS	2.0 km	MPC · JPL
394316	2006 WA_{52}	—	October 28, 2006	Mount Lemmon	Mount Lemmon Survey	·	2.3 km	MPC · JPL
394317	2006 WS_{52}	—	November 1, 2006	Mount Lemmon	Mount Lemmon Survey	EOS	2.0 km	MPC · JPL
394318	2006 WR_{73}	—	November 18, 2006	Kitt Peak	Spacewatch	·	1.7 km	MPC · JPL
394319	2006 WM_{87}	—	November 18, 2006	Mount Lemmon	Mount Lemmon Survey	·	2.6 km	MPC · JPL
394320	2006 WN_{97}	—	November 19, 2006	Kitt Peak	Spacewatch	HYG	3.0 km	MPC · JPL
394321	2006 WX_{102}	—	October 28, 2006	Mount Lemmon	Mount Lemmon Survey	THM	2.4 km	MPC · JPL
394322	2006 WB_{103}	—	November 19, 2006	Kitt Peak	Spacewatch	EOS	2.2 km	MPC · JPL
394323	2006 WY_{103}	—	October 28, 2006	Mount Lemmon	Mount Lemmon Survey	EOS	1.8 km	MPC · JPL
394324	2006 WC_{109}	—	November 19, 2006	Kitt Peak	Spacewatch	·	2.1 km	MPC · JPL
394325	2006 WY_{116}	—	October 4, 2006	Mount Lemmon	Mount Lemmon Survey	·	2.5 km	MPC · JPL
394326	2006 WL_{139}	—	November 11, 2006	Kitt Peak	Spacewatch	·	2.7 km	MPC · JPL
394327	2006 WN_{164}	—	November 23, 2006	Kitt Peak	Spacewatch	KOR	1.3 km	MPC · JPL
394328	2006 WJ_{166}	—	November 11, 2006	Kitt Peak	Spacewatch	·	2.3 km	MPC · JPL
394329	2006 WJ_{174}	—	November 23, 2006	Kitt Peak	Spacewatch	·	2.3 km	MPC · JPL
394330	2006 WM_{187}	—	November 15, 2006	Catalina	CSS	·	1.9 km	MPC · JPL
394331	2006 WS_{187}	—	September 27, 2006	Mount Lemmon	Mount Lemmon Survey	·	3.2 km	MPC · JPL
394332	2006 WG_{192}	—	November 15, 2006	Kitt Peak	Spacewatch	·	3.1 km	MPC · JPL
394333	2006 WR_{192}	—	November 27, 2006	Kitt Peak	Spacewatch	·	1.5 km	MPC · JPL
394334	2006 WV_{193}	—	November 14, 2006	Mount Lemmon	Mount Lemmon Survey	EOS	2.0 km	MPC · JPL
394335	2006 WN_{199}	—	November 19, 2006	Kitt Peak	Spacewatch	EOS	4.2 km	MPC · JPL
394336	2006 WN_{202}	—	November 25, 2006	Kitt Peak	Spacewatch	·	3.3 km	MPC · JPL
394337	2006 WH_{205}	—	November 20, 2006	Kitt Peak	Spacewatch	·	2.7 km	MPC · JPL
394338	2006 XR_{11}	—	September 27, 2006	Mount Lemmon	Mount Lemmon Survey	·	3.3 km	MPC · JPL
394339	2006 XA_{15}	—	December 10, 2006	Kitt Peak	Spacewatch	·	2.5 km	MPC · JPL
394340	2006 XC_{18}	—	December 10, 2006	Kitt Peak	Spacewatch	·	4.0 km	MPC · JPL
394341	2006 XY_{69}	—	December 11, 2006	Kitt Peak	Spacewatch	·	3.5 km	MPC · JPL
394342	2006 XZ_{70}	—	December 13, 2006	Kitt Peak	Spacewatch	·	3.7 km	MPC · JPL
394343	2006 XV_{71}	—	December 1, 2006	Mount Lemmon	Mount Lemmon Survey	·	3.0 km	MPC · JPL
394344	2006 YL	—	December 17, 2006	7300	W. K. Y. Yeung	·	5.1 km	MPC · JPL
394345	2006 YH_{29}	—	December 21, 2006	Kitt Peak	Spacewatch	·	4.1 km	MPC · JPL
394346	2006 YU_{38}	—	December 21, 2006	Kitt Peak	Spacewatch	·	610 m	MPC · JPL
394347	2007 AD_{1}	—	January 8, 2007	Mount Lemmon	Mount Lemmon Survey	·	510 m	MPC · JPL
394348	2007 AJ_{23}	—	December 21, 2006	Mount Lemmon	Mount Lemmon Survey	·	4.4 km	MPC · JPL
394349	2007 AH_{28}	—	January 9, 2007	Kitt Peak	Spacewatch	·	5.4 km	MPC · JPL
394350	2007 BF_{10}	—	January 17, 2007	Kitt Peak	Spacewatch	·	3.3 km	MPC · JPL
394351	2007 BM_{11}	—	January 17, 2007	Palomar	NEAT	·	5.4 km	MPC · JPL
394352	2007 BN_{16}	—	January 17, 2007	Catalina	CSS	·	970 m	MPC · JPL
394353	2007 BK_{37}	—	September 13, 2005	Kitt Peak	Spacewatch	·	720 m	MPC · JPL
394354	2007 BL_{43}	—	January 24, 2007	Mount Lemmon	Mount Lemmon Survey	·	690 m	MPC · JPL
394355	2007 BF_{44}	—	December 24, 2006	Mount Lemmon	Mount Lemmon Survey	·	810 m	MPC · JPL
394356	2007 BB_{48}	—	January 26, 2007	Kitt Peak	Spacewatch	·	620 m	MPC · JPL
394357	2007 BB_{57}	—	April 29, 2003	Kitt Peak	Spacewatch	EOS	3.2 km	MPC · JPL
394358	2007 BY_{62}	—	January 27, 2007	Mount Lemmon	Mount Lemmon Survey	·	3.4 km	MPC · JPL
394359	2007 BW_{68}	—	January 27, 2007	Mount Lemmon	Mount Lemmon Survey	LUT	5.4 km	MPC · JPL
394360	2007 BZ_{79}	—	January 17, 2007	Kitt Peak	Spacewatch	·	650 m	MPC · JPL
394361	2007 CO_{14}	—	February 7, 2007	Mount Lemmon	Mount Lemmon Survey	·	700 m	MPC · JPL
394362	2007 CS_{23}	—	February 7, 2007	Kitt Peak	Spacewatch	·	600 m	MPC · JPL
394363	2007 CP_{60}	—	February 10, 2007	Catalina	CSS	·	2.4 km	MPC · JPL
394364	2007 DD_{1}	—	February 18, 2007	Calvin-Rehoboth	Calvin College	·	720 m	MPC · JPL
394365	2007 DG_{22}	—	January 27, 2007	Mount Lemmon	Mount Lemmon Survey	·	760 m	MPC · JPL
394366	2007 DH_{25}	—	February 17, 2007	Kitt Peak	Spacewatch	·	630 m	MPC · JPL
394367	2007 DW_{32}	—	February 17, 2007	Kitt Peak	Spacewatch	·	680 m	MPC · JPL
394368	2007 DK_{33}	—	February 17, 2007	Kitt Peak	Spacewatch	·	830 m	MPC · JPL
394369	2007 DG_{35}	—	February 17, 2007	Kitt Peak	Spacewatch	·	560 m	MPC · JPL
394370	2007 DU_{36}	—	February 17, 2007	Kitt Peak	Spacewatch	·	730 m	MPC · JPL
394371	2007 DK_{55}	—	February 21, 2007	Socorro	LINEAR	·	930 m	MPC · JPL
394372	2007 DZ_{56}	—	February 21, 2007	Mount Lemmon	Mount Lemmon Survey	·	620 m	MPC · JPL
394373	2007 DY_{67}	—	February 21, 2007	Kitt Peak	Spacewatch	·	900 m	MPC · JPL
394374	2007 DD_{74}	—	February 21, 2007	Kitt Peak	Spacewatch	·	550 m	MPC · JPL
394375	2007 DM_{76}	—	February 22, 2007	Kitt Peak	Spacewatch	·	690 m	MPC · JPL
394376	2007 DD_{86}	—	February 21, 2007	Kitt Peak	Spacewatch	·	680 m	MPC · JPL
394377	2007 DN_{89}	—	February 23, 2007	Mount Lemmon	Mount Lemmon Survey	·	590 m	MPC · JPL
394378	2007 DG_{110}	—	February 17, 2007	Kitt Peak	Spacewatch	·	730 m	MPC · JPL
394379	2007 DO_{111}	—	February 25, 2007	Kitt Peak	Spacewatch	·	770 m	MPC · JPL
394380	2007 EU_{3}	—	March 9, 2007	Kitt Peak	Spacewatch	·	730 m	MPC · JPL
394381	2007 EF_{5}	—	March 9, 2007	Mount Lemmon	Mount Lemmon Survey	·	670 m	MPC · JPL
394382	2007 EU_{6}	—	February 8, 2007	Kitt Peak	Spacewatch	·	760 m	MPC · JPL
394383	2007 EN_{34}	—	February 26, 2007	Mount Lemmon	Mount Lemmon Survey	·	780 m	MPC · JPL
394384	2007 EX_{35}	—	February 17, 2007	Kitt Peak	Spacewatch	·	610 m	MPC · JPL
394385	2007 EZ_{44}	—	March 9, 2007	Kitt Peak	Spacewatch	(2076)	660 m	MPC · JPL
394386	2007 ES_{45}	—	March 9, 2007	Kitt Peak	Spacewatch	·	560 m	MPC · JPL
394387	2007 EB_{52}	—	March 11, 2007	Catalina	CSS	·	850 m	MPC · JPL
394388	2007 EE_{60}	—	March 9, 2007	Mount Lemmon	Mount Lemmon Survey	·	670 m	MPC · JPL
394389	2007 EP_{70}	—	March 10, 2007	Kitt Peak	Spacewatch	·	1.3 km	MPC · JPL
394390	2007 ES_{72}	—	March 10, 2007	Kitt Peak	Spacewatch	·	670 m	MPC · JPL
394391	2007 EO_{82}	—	March 12, 2007	Kitt Peak	Spacewatch	·	5.0 km	MPC · JPL
394392	2007 EP_{88}	—	March 15, 2007	Siding Spring	SSS	ATE	640 m	MPC · JPL
394393	2007 EK_{92}	—	March 10, 2007	Kitt Peak	Spacewatch	·	670 m	MPC · JPL
394394	2007 EZ_{93}	—	March 10, 2007	Mount Lemmon	Mount Lemmon Survey	·	700 m	MPC · JPL
394395	2007 EH_{110}	—	March 11, 2007	Kitt Peak	Spacewatch	·	710 m	MPC · JPL
394396	2007 EK_{111}	—	March 11, 2007	Kitt Peak	Spacewatch	·	730 m	MPC · JPL
394397	2007 EN_{132}	—	March 9, 2007	Mount Lemmon	Mount Lemmon Survey	·	560 m	MPC · JPL
394398	2007 EZ_{135}	—	March 10, 2007	Mount Lemmon	Mount Lemmon Survey	·	670 m	MPC · JPL
394399	2007 EY_{177}	—	March 14, 2007	Kitt Peak	Spacewatch	V	640 m	MPC · JPL
394400	2007 ER_{197}	—	March 15, 2007	Kitt Peak	Spacewatch	NYS	820 m	MPC · JPL

== 394401–394500 ==
back to top

Designation			Discovery			Properties		Ref
Permanent	Provisional	Named after	Date	Site	Discoverer(s)	Category	Diam.	Ref
394401	2007 FG_{27}	—	March 20, 2007	Mount Lemmon	Mount Lemmon Survey	·	1.1 km	MPC · JPL
394402	2007 GF_{21}	—	April 11, 2007	Mount Lemmon	Mount Lemmon Survey	·	1.1 km	MPC · JPL
394403	2007 GT_{22}	—	April 11, 2007	Mount Lemmon	Mount Lemmon Survey	V	600 m	MPC · JPL
394404	2007 GJ_{23}	—	April 11, 2007	Kitt Peak	Spacewatch	·	780 m	MPC · JPL
394405	2007 GZ_{34}	—	March 10, 2007	Kitt Peak	Spacewatch	·	560 m	MPC · JPL
394406	2007 GM_{39}	—	April 14, 2007	Kitt Peak	Spacewatch	·	1.1 km	MPC · JPL
394407	2007 GS_{41}	—	April 14, 2007	Kitt Peak	Spacewatch	·	660 m	MPC · JPL
394408	2007 GZ_{47}	—	April 14, 2007	Kitt Peak	Spacewatch	·	1.1 km	MPC · JPL
394409	2007 GV_{48}	—	March 14, 2007	Mount Lemmon	Mount Lemmon Survey	·	870 m	MPC · JPL
394410	2007 GO_{57}	—	April 15, 2007	Kitt Peak	Spacewatch	·	800 m	MPC · JPL
394411	2007 GN_{58}	—	April 15, 2007	Mount Lemmon	Mount Lemmon Survey	·	580 m	MPC · JPL
394412	2007 GF_{62}	—	September 22, 2001	Kitt Peak	Spacewatch	V	760 m	MPC · JPL
394413	2007 GV_{62}	—	April 15, 2007	Kitt Peak	Spacewatch	PHO	1.0 km	MPC · JPL
394414	2007 GJ_{67}	—	April 15, 2007	Kitt Peak	Spacewatch	·	690 m	MPC · JPL
394415	2007 GU_{69}	—	April 15, 2007	Mount Lemmon	Mount Lemmon Survey	·	810 m	MPC · JPL
394416	2007 HV_{20}	—	April 18, 2007	Kitt Peak	Spacewatch	·	1.3 km	MPC · JPL
394417	2007 HD_{22}	—	April 18, 2007	Kitt Peak	Spacewatch	V	720 m	MPC · JPL
394418	2007 HH_{58}	—	April 23, 2007	Catalina	CSS	·	890 m	MPC · JPL
394419	2007 HB_{67}	—	April 22, 2007	Mount Lemmon	Mount Lemmon Survey	V	750 m	MPC · JPL
394420	2007 HH_{69}	—	April 24, 2007	Kitt Peak	Spacewatch	·	510 m	MPC · JPL
394421	2007 HT_{74}	—	April 22, 2007	Kitt Peak	Spacewatch	·	860 m	MPC · JPL
394422	2007 JD_{9}	—	March 13, 2007	Mount Lemmon	Mount Lemmon Survey	NYS	1.0 km	MPC · JPL
394423	2007 JT_{10}	—	May 7, 2007	Kitt Peak	Spacewatch	NYS	1.2 km	MPC · JPL
394424	2007 JZ_{17}	—	April 15, 2007	Kitt Peak	Spacewatch	NYS	1.3 km	MPC · JPL
394425	2007 JG_{19}	—	May 10, 2007	Kitt Peak	Spacewatch	·	1.7 km	MPC · JPL
394426	2007 JY_{27}	—	April 18, 2007	Kitt Peak	Spacewatch	·	1.1 km	MPC · JPL
394427	2007 JG_{32}	—	May 12, 2007	Kitt Peak	Spacewatch	·	1.1 km	MPC · JPL
394428	2007 KA	—	May 16, 2007	Wrightwood	J. W. Young	·	1.1 km	MPC · JPL
394429	2007 LF_{7}	—	June 8, 2007	Kitt Peak	Spacewatch	·	900 m	MPC · JPL
394430	2007 LF_{8}	—	June 9, 2007	Kitt Peak	Spacewatch	·	1.4 km	MPC · JPL
394431	2007 MH_{7}	—	June 18, 2007	Kitt Peak	Spacewatch	·	990 m	MPC · JPL
394432	2007 NC	—	July 6, 2007	Pla D'Arguines	R. Ferrando	PHO	1 km	MPC · JPL
394433	2007 PT_{1}	—	August 6, 2007	Reedy Creek	J. Broughton	NYS	1.4 km	MPC · JPL
394434	2007 PE_{2}	—	August 7, 2007	Eskridge	G. Hug	MAS	780 m	MPC · JPL
394435	2007 PD_{4}	—	August 8, 2007	Siding Spring	SSS	PHO	2.7 km	MPC · JPL
394436	2007 PN_{7}	—	August 8, 2007	Socorro	LINEAR	·	1.3 km	MPC · JPL
394437	2007 PN_{9}	—	August 12, 2007	Great Shefford	Birtwhistle, P.	(5)	1.0 km	MPC · JPL
394438	2007 PJ_{35}	—	August 9, 2007	Socorro	LINEAR	·	1.5 km	MPC · JPL
394439	2007 PH_{40}	—	August 12, 2007	Socorro	LINEAR	·	1.1 km	MPC · JPL
394440	2007 PT_{40}	—	August 9, 2007	Socorro	LINEAR	·	1.2 km	MPC · JPL
394441	2007 PH_{43}	—	August 10, 2007	Kitt Peak	Spacewatch	·	1.3 km	MPC · JPL
394442	2007 PV_{46}	—	August 10, 2007	Kitt Peak	Spacewatch	·	1.1 km	MPC · JPL
394443	2007 QC_{9}	—	August 22, 2007	Socorro	LINEAR	·	1.1 km	MPC · JPL
394444	2007 RH_{8}	—	September 5, 2007	Catalina	CSS	·	1.3 km	MPC · JPL
394445 Unst	2007 RY_{12}	Unst	September 11, 2007	Vicques	M. Ory	·	1.7 km	MPC · JPL
394446	2007 RS_{21}	—	September 3, 2007	Catalina	CSS	·	1.9 km	MPC · JPL
394447	2007 RG_{23}	—	September 3, 2007	Catalina	CSS	PHO	1.1 km	MPC · JPL
394448	2007 RU_{31}	—	September 5, 2007	Catalina	CSS	·	1.4 km	MPC · JPL
394449	2007 RH_{61}	—	September 10, 2007	Mount Lemmon	Mount Lemmon Survey	·	1.0 km	MPC · JPL
394450	2007 RJ_{92}	—	September 10, 2007	Mount Lemmon	Mount Lemmon Survey	·	1.4 km	MPC · JPL
394451	2007 RM_{93}	—	September 10, 2007	Kitt Peak	Spacewatch	·	1.5 km	MPC · JPL
394452	2007 RH_{115}	—	September 11, 2007	Kitt Peak	Spacewatch	MAR	1.0 km	MPC · JPL
394453	2007 RF_{127}	—	September 12, 2007	Mount Lemmon	Mount Lemmon Survey	·	1.5 km	MPC · JPL
394454	2007 RE_{129}	—	September 12, 2007	Mount Lemmon	Mount Lemmon Survey	MAS	770 m	MPC · JPL
394455	2007 RU_{179}	—	September 10, 2007	Mount Lemmon	Mount Lemmon Survey	EUN	1.5 km	MPC · JPL
394456	2007 RA_{190}	—	September 10, 2007	Catalina	CSS	EUN	1.2 km	MPC · JPL
394457	2007 RD_{190}	—	September 4, 2007	Catalina	CSS	·	1.5 km	MPC · JPL
394458	2007 RS_{210}	—	April 30, 2006	Kitt Peak	Spacewatch	·	950 m	MPC · JPL
394459	2007 RV_{217}	—	September 13, 2007	Kitt Peak	Spacewatch	MAR	780 m	MPC · JPL
394460	2007 RY_{229}	—	September 11, 2007	Kitt Peak	Spacewatch	·	1.1 km	MPC · JPL
394461	2007 RR_{238}	—	September 14, 2007	Catalina	CSS	ERI	1.7 km	MPC · JPL
394462	2007 RA_{249}	—	March 9, 2002	Kitt Peak	Spacewatch	·	1.0 km	MPC · JPL
394463	2007 RS_{273}	—	September 15, 2007	Kitt Peak	Spacewatch	·	1.8 km	MPC · JPL
394464	2007 RV_{288}	—	September 15, 2007	Mount Lemmon	Mount Lemmon Survey	MRX	1.4 km	MPC · JPL
394465	2007 RY_{288}	—	September 9, 2007	Mount Lemmon	Mount Lemmon Survey	KON	2.6 km	MPC · JPL
394466	2007 RB_{289}	—	September 10, 2007	Mount Lemmon	Mount Lemmon Survey	·	1.1 km	MPC · JPL
394467	2007 RV_{318}	—	September 11, 2007	Mount Lemmon	Mount Lemmon Survey	·	1.6 km	MPC · JPL
394468	2007 SD_{4}	—	September 8, 2007	Catalina	CSS	·	2.4 km	MPC · JPL
394469	2007 SC_{14}	—	September 20, 2007	Catalina	CSS	·	2.0 km	MPC · JPL
394470	2007 TT_{4}	—	October 6, 2007	7300	W. K. Y. Yeung	·	2.0 km	MPC · JPL
394471	2007 TF_{10}	—	March 18, 2005	Catalina	CSS	HNS	1.4 km	MPC · JPL
394472	2007 TC_{11}	—	October 6, 2007	Socorro	LINEAR	·	1.7 km	MPC · JPL
394473	2007 TC_{18}	—	October 9, 2007	7300	W. K. Y. Yeung	·	1.8 km	MPC · JPL
394474	2007 TT_{23}	—	October 4, 2007	Kitt Peak	Spacewatch	·	1.6 km	MPC · JPL
394475	2007 TL_{27}	—	October 4, 2007	Kitt Peak	Spacewatch	·	1.6 km	MPC · JPL
394476	2007 TA_{30}	—	October 4, 2007	Kitt Peak	Spacewatch	·	1.8 km	MPC · JPL
394477	2007 TY_{39}	—	October 6, 2007	Kitt Peak	Spacewatch	·	1.7 km	MPC · JPL
394478	2007 TX_{40}	—	October 6, 2007	Kitt Peak	Spacewatch	KON	2.6 km	MPC · JPL
394479	2007 TK_{48}	—	October 4, 2007	Kitt Peak	Spacewatch	·	1.5 km	MPC · JPL
394480	2007 TF_{49}	—	October 4, 2007	Kitt Peak	Spacewatch	·	2.3 km	MPC · JPL
394481	2007 TX_{51}	—	October 4, 2007	Kitt Peak	Spacewatch	·	1.1 km	MPC · JPL
394482	2007 TX_{53}	—	October 4, 2007	Kitt Peak	Spacewatch	·	1.6 km	MPC · JPL
394483	2007 TN_{68}	—	October 12, 2007	7300	W. K. Y. Yeung	·	2.0 km	MPC · JPL
394484	2007 TK_{69}	—	October 14, 2007	Altschwendt	W. Ries	·	2.0 km	MPC · JPL
394485	2007 TV_{81}	—	September 9, 2007	Mount Lemmon	Mount Lemmon Survey	·	1.9 km	MPC · JPL
394486	2007 TD_{84}	—	October 8, 2007	Catalina	CSS	·	1.6 km	MPC · JPL
394487	2007 TO_{90}	—	October 8, 2007	Mount Lemmon	Mount Lemmon Survey	HNS	1.1 km	MPC · JPL
394488	2007 TK_{98}	—	October 8, 2007	Mount Lemmon	Mount Lemmon Survey	·	1.2 km	MPC · JPL
394489	2007 TQ_{106}	—	October 4, 2007	Kitt Peak	Spacewatch	·	1.8 km	MPC · JPL
394490	2007 TF_{112}	—	September 15, 2007	Anderson Mesa	LONEOS	·	2.2 km	MPC · JPL
394491	2007 TJ_{129}	—	September 12, 2007	Mount Lemmon	Mount Lemmon Survey	·	2.0 km	MPC · JPL
394492	2007 TC_{139}	—	October 9, 2007	Kitt Peak	Spacewatch	·	2.2 km	MPC · JPL
394493	2007 TK_{144}	—	October 6, 2007	Socorro	LINEAR	·	1.4 km	MPC · JPL
394494	2007 TP_{154}	—	October 9, 2007	Socorro	LINEAR	EUN	1.2 km	MPC · JPL
394495	2007 TN_{170}	—	October 12, 2007	Kitt Peak	Spacewatch	HNS	1.5 km	MPC · JPL
394496	2007 TZ_{172}	—	October 2, 2007	Charleston	Astronomical Research Observatory	·	2.1 km	MPC · JPL
394497	2007 TQ_{185}	—	September 12, 2007	Catalina	CSS	EUN	1.4 km	MPC · JPL
394498	2007 TF_{196}	—	October 7, 2007	Mount Lemmon	Mount Lemmon Survey	·	2.1 km	MPC · JPL
394499	2007 TT_{203}	—	September 18, 2007	Mount Lemmon	Mount Lemmon Survey	·	1.4 km	MPC · JPL
394500	2007 TN_{210}	—	October 6, 2007	Kitt Peak	Spacewatch	·	1.1 km	MPC · JPL

== 394501–394600 ==
back to top

Designation			Discovery			Properties		Ref
Permanent	Provisional	Named after	Date	Site	Discoverer(s)	Category	Diam.	Ref
394501	2007 TW_{211}	—	October 7, 2007	Kitt Peak	Spacewatch	·	1.7 km	MPC · JPL
394502	2007 TE_{212}	—	October 7, 2007	Kitt Peak	Spacewatch	·	1.2 km	MPC · JPL
394503	2007 TD_{220}	—	October 8, 2007	Mount Lemmon	Mount Lemmon Survey	(194)	1.3 km	MPC · JPL
394504	2007 TM_{234}	—	October 8, 2007	Kitt Peak	Spacewatch	·	2.0 km	MPC · JPL
394505	2007 TQ_{239}	—	September 9, 2007	Mount Lemmon	Mount Lemmon Survey	·	1.4 km	MPC · JPL
394506	2007 TX_{239}	—	October 10, 2007	Kitt Peak	Spacewatch	·	2.1 km	MPC · JPL
394507	2007 TM_{242}	—	October 8, 2007	Catalina	CSS	·	2.9 km	MPC · JPL
394508	2007 TV_{247}	—	October 10, 2007	Kitt Peak	Spacewatch	·	1.6 km	MPC · JPL
394509	2007 TV_{259}	—	October 10, 2007	Mount Lemmon	Mount Lemmon Survey	·	1.2 km	MPC · JPL
394510	2007 TY_{261}	—	October 10, 2007	Kitt Peak	Spacewatch	·	1.3 km	MPC · JPL
394511	2007 TL_{266}	—	October 6, 2007	Kitt Peak	Spacewatch	·	1.2 km	MPC · JPL
394512	2007 TT_{273}	—	October 10, 2007	Anderson Mesa	LONEOS	·	990 m	MPC · JPL
394513	2007 TG_{274}	—	September 19, 2007	Kitt Peak	Spacewatch	·	1.6 km	MPC · JPL
394514	2007 TA_{284}	—	August 9, 2007	Socorro	LINEAR	NYS	1.4 km	MPC · JPL
394515	2007 TZ_{293}	—	September 14, 2007	Mount Lemmon	Mount Lemmon Survey	·	2.0 km	MPC · JPL
394516	2007 TF_{302}	—	October 12, 2007	Kitt Peak	Spacewatch	·	1.4 km	MPC · JPL
394517	2007 TC_{303}	—	October 12, 2007	Kitt Peak	Spacewatch	·	1.8 km	MPC · JPL
394518	2007 TB_{312}	—	October 11, 2007	Mount Lemmon	Mount Lemmon Survey	·	1.1 km	MPC · JPL
394519	2007 TJ_{313}	—	October 11, 2007	Mount Lemmon	Mount Lemmon Survey	·	1.5 km	MPC · JPL
394520	2007 TR_{328}	—	June 19, 2006	Mount Lemmon	Mount Lemmon Survey	·	1.9 km	MPC · JPL
394521	2007 TL_{333}	—	October 11, 2007	Kitt Peak	Spacewatch	·	2.1 km	MPC · JPL
394522	2007 TH_{361}	—	October 15, 2007	Mount Lemmon	Mount Lemmon Survey	·	1.2 km	MPC · JPL
394523	2007 TW_{361}	—	October 14, 2007	Mount Lemmon	Mount Lemmon Survey	·	1.9 km	MPC · JPL
394524	2007 TX_{361}	—	October 15, 2007	Mount Lemmon	Mount Lemmon Survey	·	1.9 km	MPC · JPL
394525	2007 TC_{376}	—	October 8, 2007	Mount Lemmon	Mount Lemmon Survey	·	1.6 km	MPC · JPL
394526	2007 TZ_{380}	—	October 14, 2007	Kitt Peak	Spacewatch	·	1.6 km	MPC · JPL
394527	2007 TT_{383}	—	October 14, 2007	Kitt Peak	Spacewatch	·	1.7 km	MPC · JPL
394528	2007 TG_{386}	—	October 15, 2007	Catalina	CSS	·	1.8 km	MPC · JPL
394529	2007 TO_{392}	—	October 15, 2007	Catalina	CSS	·	2.0 km	MPC · JPL
394530	2007 TQ_{392}	—	September 14, 2007	Catalina	CSS	·	2.2 km	MPC · JPL
394531	2007 TJ_{413}	—	October 15, 2007	Anderson Mesa	LONEOS	·	2.0 km	MPC · JPL
394532	2007 TV_{424}	—	October 8, 2007	Kitt Peak	Spacewatch	·	1.3 km	MPC · JPL
394533	2007 TC_{431}	—	October 10, 2007	Kitt Peak	Spacewatch	·	1.8 km	MPC · JPL
394534	2007 TT_{438}	—	May 8, 2006	Kitt Peak	Spacewatch	·	950 m	MPC · JPL
394535	2007 TB_{442}	—	October 10, 2007	Catalina	CSS	EUN	1.3 km	MPC · JPL
394536	2007 TV_{448}	—	October 9, 2007	Kitt Peak	Spacewatch	·	2.0 km	MPC · JPL
394537	2007 TS_{449}	—	October 10, 2007	Mount Lemmon	Mount Lemmon Survey	·	1.7 km	MPC · JPL
394538	2007 TT_{451}	—	October 9, 2007	Kitt Peak	Spacewatch	·	2.3 km	MPC · JPL
394539	2007 UD_{1}	—	October 16, 2007	Bisei SG Center	BATTeRS	·	910 m	MPC · JPL
394540	2007 UL_{7}	—	October 16, 2007	Catalina	CSS	H	690 m	MPC · JPL
394541	2007 UF_{25}	—	October 16, 2007	Kitt Peak	Spacewatch	·	1.4 km	MPC · JPL
394542	2007 UH_{35}	—	October 19, 2007	Catalina	CSS	·	2.0 km	MPC · JPL
394543	2007 UG_{36}	—	October 19, 2007	Catalina	CSS	ADE	1.8 km	MPC · JPL
394544	2007 UD_{37}	—	October 19, 2007	Catalina	CSS	T_{j} (2.96) · 3:2	6.5 km	MPC · JPL
394545	2007 UW_{47}	—	October 20, 2007	Catalina	CSS	·	980 m	MPC · JPL
394546	2007 UW_{48}	—	October 20, 2007	Mount Lemmon	Mount Lemmon Survey	·	2.6 km	MPC · JPL
394547	2007 UA_{50}	—	October 24, 2007	Mount Lemmon	Mount Lemmon Survey	·	1.4 km	MPC · JPL
394548	2007 UO_{64}	—	October 30, 2007	Mount Lemmon	Mount Lemmon Survey	KON	2.4 km	MPC · JPL
394549	2007 US_{71}	—	September 10, 2007	Mount Lemmon	Mount Lemmon Survey	·	1.6 km	MPC · JPL
394550	2007 UM_{73}	—	October 5, 2007	Kitt Peak	Spacewatch	·	1.3 km	MPC · JPL
394551	2007 UG_{75}	—	October 7, 2007	Kitt Peak	Spacewatch	·	1.6 km	MPC · JPL
394552	2007 UB_{78}	—	October 30, 2007	Kitt Peak	Spacewatch	·	1.4 km	MPC · JPL
394553	2007 UJ_{78}	—	October 30, 2007	Catalina	CSS	H	620 m	MPC · JPL
394554	2007 UU_{85}	—	October 30, 2007	Kitt Peak	Spacewatch	MAR	1.0 km	MPC · JPL
394555	2007 UW_{85}	—	October 30, 2007	Kitt Peak	Spacewatch	·	1.3 km	MPC · JPL
394556	2007 UG_{93}	—	October 12, 2007	Kitt Peak	Spacewatch	·	980 m	MPC · JPL
394557	2007 UQ_{95}	—	October 30, 2007	Catalina	CSS	·	1.4 km	MPC · JPL
394558	2007 UD_{117}	—	October 30, 2007	Catalina	CSS	·	1.6 km	MPC · JPL
394559	2007 UU_{118}	—	September 11, 2007	Mount Lemmon	Mount Lemmon Survey	·	1.8 km	MPC · JPL
394560	2007 UQ_{139}	—	October 24, 2007	Mount Lemmon	Mount Lemmon Survey	·	2.1 km	MPC · JPL
394561	2007 UE_{140}	—	October 16, 2007	Mount Lemmon	Mount Lemmon Survey	NEM	2.6 km	MPC · JPL
394562	2007 UY_{140}	—	October 21, 2007	Mount Lemmon	Mount Lemmon Survey	·	1.5 km	MPC · JPL
394563	2007 UN_{141}	—	October 30, 2007	Kitt Peak	Spacewatch	·	1.5 km	MPC · JPL
394564	2007 UR_{141}	—	October 20, 2007	Mount Lemmon	Mount Lemmon Survey	·	1.6 km	MPC · JPL
394565	2007 VR	—	November 1, 2007	Eskridge	G. Hug	·	1.7 km	MPC · JPL
394566	2007 VB_{12}	—	November 6, 2007	Eskridge	G. Hug	GEF	1.3 km	MPC · JPL
394567	2007 VX_{14}	—	November 1, 2007	Kitt Peak	Spacewatch	·	1.6 km	MPC · JPL
394568	2007 VX_{22}	—	November 2, 2007	Mount Lemmon	Mount Lemmon Survey	·	1.8 km	MPC · JPL
394569	2007 VN_{34}	—	November 3, 2007	7300	W. K. Y. Yeung	RAF	1.2 km	MPC · JPL
394570	2007 VV_{46}	—	November 1, 2007	Kitt Peak	Spacewatch	·	2.1 km	MPC · JPL
394571	2007 VA_{47}	—	September 10, 2007	Mount Lemmon	Mount Lemmon Survey	·	1.2 km	MPC · JPL
394572	2007 VX_{53}	—	November 1, 2007	Kitt Peak	Spacewatch	·	1.9 km	MPC · JPL
394573	2007 VG_{54}	—	October 20, 2007	Mount Lemmon	Mount Lemmon Survey	MAR	1.3 km	MPC · JPL
394574	2007 VX_{55}	—	November 1, 2007	Kitt Peak	Spacewatch	HOF	2.6 km	MPC · JPL
394575	2007 VM_{56}	—	November 1, 2007	Kitt Peak	Spacewatch	·	1.2 km	MPC · JPL
394576	2007 VO_{57}	—	November 1, 2007	Kitt Peak	Spacewatch	·	2.4 km	MPC · JPL
394577	2007 VU_{60}	—	October 16, 2007	Mount Lemmon	Mount Lemmon Survey	·	2.1 km	MPC · JPL
394578	2007 VO_{65}	—	September 13, 2007	Mount Lemmon	Mount Lemmon Survey	·	1.2 km	MPC · JPL
394579	2007 VY_{68}	—	September 10, 2007	Mount Lemmon	Mount Lemmon Survey	·	1.4 km	MPC · JPL
394580	2007 VS_{70}	—	October 8, 2007	Mount Lemmon	Mount Lemmon Survey	·	1.8 km	MPC · JPL
394581	2007 VH_{76}	—	September 18, 2007	Mount Lemmon	Mount Lemmon Survey	·	1.2 km	MPC · JPL
394582	2007 VS_{81}	—	May 20, 2006	Kitt Peak	Spacewatch	·	1.1 km	MPC · JPL
394583	2007 VN_{107}	—	November 3, 2007	Kitt Peak	Spacewatch	·	1.6 km	MPC · JPL
394584	2007 VZ_{112}	—	September 15, 2007	Mount Lemmon	Mount Lemmon Survey	·	2.2 km	MPC · JPL
394585	2007 VC_{116}	—	November 3, 2007	Kitt Peak	Spacewatch	·	1.5 km	MPC · JPL
394586	2007 VF_{125}	—	November 5, 2007	Purple Mountain	PMO NEO Survey Program	·	2.3 km	MPC · JPL
394587	2007 VJ_{128}	—	November 1, 2007	Mount Lemmon	Mount Lemmon Survey	·	1.1 km	MPC · JPL
394588	2007 VS_{134}	—	October 12, 2007	Mount Lemmon	Mount Lemmon Survey	MAR	1.2 km	MPC · JPL
394589	2007 VP_{143}	—	November 4, 2007	Kitt Peak	Spacewatch	(5)	1.2 km	MPC · JPL
394590	2007 VA_{171}	—	November 7, 2007	Kitt Peak	Spacewatch	WIT	1.0 km	MPC · JPL
394591	2007 VK_{171}	—	November 7, 2007	Kitt Peak	Spacewatch	HOF	2.3 km	MPC · JPL
394592	2007 VS_{184}	—	October 10, 2007	Catalina	CSS	H	450 m	MPC · JPL
394593	2007 VD_{189}	—	November 14, 2007	Bisei SG Center	BATTeRS	·	1.4 km	MPC · JPL
394594	2007 VT_{207}	—	November 11, 2007	Mount Lemmon	Mount Lemmon Survey	·	1.9 km	MPC · JPL
394595	2007 VX_{216}	—	November 9, 2007	Kitt Peak	Spacewatch	·	1.6 km	MPC · JPL
394596	2007 VG_{218}	—	November 9, 2007	Kitt Peak	Spacewatch	·	1.8 km	MPC · JPL
394597	2007 VU_{229}	—	June 11, 2005	Kitt Peak	Spacewatch	·	2.3 km	MPC · JPL
394598	2007 VR_{233}	—	October 20, 2007	Mount Lemmon	Mount Lemmon Survey	·	2.2 km	MPC · JPL
394599	2007 VW_{234}	—	November 9, 2007	Kitt Peak	Spacewatch	·	1.3 km	MPC · JPL
394600	2007 VT_{239}	—	October 30, 2007	Kitt Peak	Spacewatch	(5)	1.5 km	MPC · JPL

== 394601–394700 ==
back to top

Designation			Discovery			Properties		Ref
Permanent	Provisional	Named after	Date	Site	Discoverer(s)	Category	Diam.	Ref
394601	2007 VE_{252}	—	November 12, 2007	Catalina	CSS	·	2.4 km	MPC · JPL
394602	2007 VP_{259}	—	April 24, 1996	Kitt Peak	Spacewatch	·	2.1 km	MPC · JPL
394603	2007 VC_{262}	—	October 15, 2007	Mount Lemmon	Mount Lemmon Survey	·	2.3 km	MPC · JPL
394604	2007 VQ_{263}	—	November 13, 2007	Mount Lemmon	Mount Lemmon Survey	·	1.8 km	MPC · JPL
394605	2007 VW_{268}	—	November 12, 2007	Socorro	LINEAR	·	2.4 km	MPC · JPL
394606	2007 VB_{269}	—	November 12, 2007	Socorro	LINEAR	EUN	2.1 km	MPC · JPL
394607	2007 VP_{285}	—	November 5, 2007	Mount Lemmon	Mount Lemmon Survey	·	2.1 km	MPC · JPL
394608	2007 VK_{293}	—	November 6, 2007	XuYi	PMO NEO Survey Program	·	2.8 km	MPC · JPL
394609	2007 VH_{294}	—	November 5, 2007	Kitt Peak	Spacewatch	NEM	2.1 km	MPC · JPL
394610	2007 VJ_{301}	—	November 15, 2007	Catalina	CSS	·	1.7 km	MPC · JPL
394611	2007 VC_{308}	—	November 5, 2007	Mount Lemmon	Mount Lemmon Survey	·	970 m	MPC · JPL
394612	2007 VV_{310}	—	November 11, 2007	Mount Lemmon	Mount Lemmon Survey	·	2.1 km	MPC · JPL
394613	2007 VK_{328}	—	November 8, 2007	Kitt Peak	Spacewatch	·	2.0 km	MPC · JPL
394614	2007 VK_{329}	—	November 18, 2007	Kitt Peak	Spacewatch	·	2.1 km	MPC · JPL
394615	2007 VW_{329}	—	November 2, 2007	Kitt Peak	Spacewatch	·	1.3 km	MPC · JPL
394616	2007 VA_{330}	—	November 2, 2007	Mount Lemmon	Mount Lemmon Survey	·	2.4 km	MPC · JPL
394617	2007 VQ_{330}	—	December 4, 2007	Socorro	LINEAR	·	2.2 km	MPC · JPL
394618	2007 VW_{330}	—	November 4, 2007	Mount Lemmon	Mount Lemmon Survey	·	2.1 km	MPC · JPL
394619	2007 VE_{333}	—	November 9, 2007	Kitt Peak	Spacewatch	·	1.4 km	MPC · JPL
394620	2007 VW_{333}	—	November 11, 2007	Mount Lemmon	Mount Lemmon Survey	BRA	1.8 km	MPC · JPL
394621	2007 WO_{4}	—	November 20, 2007	Mount Lemmon	Mount Lemmon Survey	H	530 m	MPC · JPL
394622	2007 WN_{41}	—	November 2, 2007	Mount Lemmon	Mount Lemmon Survey	·	1.7 km	MPC · JPL
394623	2007 WO_{52}	—	November 20, 2007	Mount Lemmon	Mount Lemmon Survey	·	2.5 km	MPC · JPL
394624	2007 WQ_{60}	—	November 19, 2007	Kitt Peak	Spacewatch	AGN	980 m	MPC · JPL
394625	2007 WE_{61}	—	November 19, 2007	Mount Lemmon	Mount Lemmon Survey	·	2.0 km	MPC · JPL
394626	2007 XS_{6}	—	November 8, 2007	Kitt Peak	Spacewatch	·	1.7 km	MPC · JPL
394627	2007 XP_{10}	—	October 20, 2007	Mount Lemmon	Mount Lemmon Survey	·	1.8 km	MPC · JPL
394628	2007 XG_{12}	—	December 4, 2007	Kitt Peak	Spacewatch	·	1.8 km	MPC · JPL
394629	2007 XB_{14}	—	November 18, 2007	Kitt Peak	Spacewatch	NEM	2.1 km	MPC · JPL
394630	2007 XN_{28}	—	December 15, 2007	Kitt Peak	Spacewatch	AGN	1.2 km	MPC · JPL
394631	2007 XC_{51}	—	November 12, 2007	Socorro	LINEAR	·	2.7 km	MPC · JPL
394632	2007 XX_{54}	—	November 9, 2007	Kitt Peak	Spacewatch	·	1.5 km	MPC · JPL
394633	2007 XN_{55}	—	December 4, 2007	Kitt Peak	Spacewatch	·	1.8 km	MPC · JPL
394634	2007 YA_{5}	—	December 5, 2007	Kitt Peak	Spacewatch	GEF	1.4 km	MPC · JPL
394635	2007 YH_{5}	—	November 13, 2007	Kitt Peak	Spacewatch	·	1.4 km	MPC · JPL
394636	2007 YB_{9}	—	November 12, 2007	Mount Lemmon	Mount Lemmon Survey	·	2.2 km	MPC · JPL
394637	2007 YQ_{15}	—	December 16, 2007	Kitt Peak	Spacewatch	(5)	1.6 km	MPC · JPL
394638	2007 YL_{24}	—	December 17, 2007	Mount Lemmon	Mount Lemmon Survey	·	2.0 km	MPC · JPL
394639	2007 YB_{29}	—	November 13, 2007	Kitt Peak	Spacewatch	NEM	2.7 km	MPC · JPL
394640	2007 YC_{38}	—	December 30, 2007	Mount Lemmon	Mount Lemmon Survey	·	1.6 km	MPC · JPL
394641	2007 YM_{39}	—	December 30, 2007	Mount Lemmon	Mount Lemmon Survey	·	2.3 km	MPC · JPL
394642	2007 YW_{54}	—	December 15, 2007	Catalina	CSS	·	2.0 km	MPC · JPL
394643	2007 YM_{55}	—	December 31, 2007	Mount Lemmon	Mount Lemmon Survey	·	1.8 km	MPC · JPL
394644	2007 YF_{57}	—	November 5, 2007	Kitt Peak	Spacewatch	·	2.1 km	MPC · JPL
394645	2007 YQ_{64}	—	December 18, 2007	Mount Lemmon	Mount Lemmon Survey	·	1.9 km	MPC · JPL
394646	2007 YG_{65}	—	December 20, 2007	Kitt Peak	Spacewatch	·	2.1 km	MPC · JPL
394647	2007 YB_{68}	—	December 30, 2007	Kitt Peak	Spacewatch	·	1.5 km	MPC · JPL
394648	2007 YF_{74}	—	December 31, 2007	Mount Lemmon	Mount Lemmon Survey	·	2.3 km	MPC · JPL
394649	2008 AL_{46}	—	January 11, 2008	Kitt Peak	Spacewatch	·	2.3 km	MPC · JPL
394650	2008 AS_{64}	—	January 11, 2008	Mount Lemmon	Mount Lemmon Survey	EMA	3.5 km	MPC · JPL
394651	2008 AB_{77}	—	January 12, 2008	Kitt Peak	Spacewatch	·	2.5 km	MPC · JPL
394652	2008 AN_{92}	—	January 14, 2008	Kitt Peak	Spacewatch	·	1.5 km	MPC · JPL
394653	2008 AB_{116}	—	January 13, 2008	Kitt Peak	Spacewatch	TEL	1.2 km	MPC · JPL
394654	2008 AS_{120}	—	January 6, 2008	Mauna Kea	P. A. Wiegert	·	1.9 km	MPC · JPL
394655	2008 AG_{129}	—	January 15, 2008	Mount Lemmon	Mount Lemmon Survey	·	2.2 km	MPC · JPL
394656	2008 BL_{4}	—	January 16, 2008	Kitt Peak	Spacewatch	·	2.4 km	MPC · JPL
394657	2008 BY_{11}	—	January 18, 2008	Kitt Peak	Spacewatch	·	2.2 km	MPC · JPL
394658	2008 BU_{20}	—	January 20, 2008	Mount Lemmon	Mount Lemmon Survey	EOS	2.0 km	MPC · JPL
394659	2008 BB_{30}	—	January 30, 2008	Catalina	CSS	·	2.5 km	MPC · JPL
394660	2008 BC_{51}	—	January 31, 2008	Mount Lemmon	Mount Lemmon Survey	·	1.8 km	MPC · JPL
394661	2008 CG_{11}	—	February 3, 2008	Kitt Peak	Spacewatch	·	4.0 km	MPC · JPL
394662	2008 CQ_{11}	—	February 3, 2008	Kitt Peak	Spacewatch	·	2.0 km	MPC · JPL
394663	2008 CQ_{16}	—	January 30, 2008	Kitt Peak	Spacewatch	·	2.0 km	MPC · JPL
394664	2008 CK_{18}	—	February 3, 2008	Kitt Peak	Spacewatch	·	1.9 km	MPC · JPL
394665	2008 CB_{19}	—	February 3, 2008	Kitt Peak	Spacewatch	·	2.6 km	MPC · JPL
394666	2008 CT_{23}	—	February 1, 2008	Kitt Peak	Spacewatch	EOS	1.9 km	MPC · JPL
394667	2008 CD_{32}	—	February 2, 2008	Kitt Peak	Spacewatch	BRA	1.7 km	MPC · JPL
394668	2008 CK_{33}	—	February 2, 2008	Kitt Peak	Spacewatch	·	1.5 km	MPC · JPL
394669	2008 CM_{33}	—	February 2, 2008	Kitt Peak	Spacewatch	THM	2.3 km	MPC · JPL
394670	2008 CO_{36}	—	February 2, 2008	Kitt Peak	Spacewatch	·	2.0 km	MPC · JPL
394671	2008 CD_{37}	—	February 2, 2008	Kitt Peak	Spacewatch	·	2.0 km	MPC · JPL
394672	2008 CJ_{45}	—	February 2, 2008	Kitt Peak	Spacewatch	·	3.1 km	MPC · JPL
394673	2008 CX_{46}	—	February 2, 2008	Kitt Peak	Spacewatch	·	2.4 km	MPC · JPL
394674	2008 CD_{47}	—	January 1, 2008	Mount Lemmon	Mount Lemmon Survey	·	1.9 km	MPC · JPL
394675	2008 CK_{74}	—	February 10, 2008	Junk Bond	D. Healy	·	4.2 km	MPC · JPL
394676	2008 CP_{78}	—	February 7, 2008	Kitt Peak	Spacewatch	·	2.1 km	MPC · JPL
394677	2008 CH_{81}	—	February 7, 2008	Kitt Peak	Spacewatch	·	2.8 km	MPC · JPL
394678	2008 CG_{87}	—	February 7, 2008	Mount Lemmon	Mount Lemmon Survey	·	2.1 km	MPC · JPL
394679	2008 CE_{94}	—	October 27, 2006	Catalina	CSS	·	2.5 km	MPC · JPL
394680	2008 CJ_{109}	—	February 9, 2008	Kitt Peak	Spacewatch	·	2.1 km	MPC · JPL
394681	2008 CT_{109}	—	February 9, 2008	Kitt Peak	Spacewatch	·	2.5 km	MPC · JPL
394682	2008 CD_{126}	—	February 8, 2008	Kitt Peak	Spacewatch	·	2.0 km	MPC · JPL
394683	2008 CS_{129}	—	February 8, 2008	Kitt Peak	Spacewatch	EOS	2.2 km	MPC · JPL
394684	2008 CM_{133}	—	February 8, 2008	Kitt Peak	Spacewatch	·	2.4 km	MPC · JPL
394685	2008 CR_{134}	—	February 8, 2008	Mount Lemmon	Mount Lemmon Survey	EOS	1.7 km	MPC · JPL
394686	2008 CY_{142}	—	February 8, 2008	Kitt Peak	Spacewatch	·	3.0 km	MPC · JPL
394687	2008 CX_{149}	—	February 9, 2008	Kitt Peak	Spacewatch	·	2.6 km	MPC · JPL
394688	2008 CB_{151}	—	February 9, 2008	Kitt Peak	Spacewatch	·	2.6 km	MPC · JPL
394689	2008 CZ_{160}	—	February 9, 2008	Kitt Peak	Spacewatch	·	2.3 km	MPC · JPL
394690	2008 CC_{167}	—	February 11, 2008	Mount Lemmon	Mount Lemmon Survey	·	2.3 km	MPC · JPL
394691	2008 CK_{174}	—	February 13, 2008	Mount Lemmon	Mount Lemmon Survey	·	2.7 km	MPC · JPL
394692	2008 CK_{183}	—	February 12, 2008	Mount Lemmon	Mount Lemmon Survey	EOS	1.9 km	MPC · JPL
394693	2008 CV_{183}	—	February 13, 2008	Mount Lemmon	Mount Lemmon Survey	VER	3.3 km	MPC · JPL
394694	2008 CA_{186}	—	December 11, 2002	Socorro	LINEAR	·	2.6 km	MPC · JPL
394695	2008 CL_{191}	—	February 2, 2008	Kitt Peak	Spacewatch	·	2.6 km	MPC · JPL
394696	2008 CB_{198}	—	February 10, 2008	Kitt Peak	Spacewatch	·	2.4 km	MPC · JPL
394697	2008 CP_{199}	—	February 13, 2008	Mount Lemmon	Mount Lemmon Survey	·	2.9 km	MPC · JPL
394698	2008 CH_{205}	—	February 1, 2008	Kitt Peak	Spacewatch	·	2.0 km	MPC · JPL
394699	2008 CG_{208}	—	February 13, 2008	Mount Lemmon	Mount Lemmon Survey	THM	2.2 km	MPC · JPL
394700	2008 CE_{212}	—	February 7, 2008	Mount Lemmon	Mount Lemmon Survey	EOS	1.8 km	MPC · JPL

== 394701–394800 ==
back to top

Designation			Discovery			Properties		Ref
Permanent	Provisional	Named after	Date	Site	Discoverer(s)	Category	Diam.	Ref
394701	2008 CJ_{213}	—	February 9, 2008	Mount Lemmon	Mount Lemmon Survey	HYG	2.5 km	MPC · JPL
394702	2008 DD_{12}	—	January 11, 2008	Kitt Peak	Spacewatch	·	2.1 km	MPC · JPL
394703	2008 DO_{15}	—	February 27, 2008	Mount Lemmon	Mount Lemmon Survey	·	2.4 km	MPC · JPL
394704	2008 DO_{20}	—	February 28, 2008	Mount Lemmon	Mount Lemmon Survey	·	1.7 km	MPC · JPL
394705	2008 DL_{23}	—	February 24, 2008	Kitt Peak	Spacewatch	·	2.9 km	MPC · JPL
394706	2008 DG_{27}	—	February 29, 2008	Mount Lemmon	Mount Lemmon Survey	·	3.6 km	MPC · JPL
394707	2008 DJ_{53}	—	February 10, 2008	Mount Lemmon	Mount Lemmon Survey	·	2.4 km	MPC · JPL
394708	2008 DT_{53}	—	February 29, 2008	Mount Lemmon	Mount Lemmon Survey	·	3.5 km	MPC · JPL
394709	2008 DW_{54}	—	December 5, 2007	Kitt Peak	Spacewatch	·	2.4 km	MPC · JPL
394710	2008 DD_{86}	—	February 27, 2008	Mount Lemmon	Mount Lemmon Survey	·	2.5 km	MPC · JPL
394711	2008 DP_{87}	—	February 28, 2008	Mount Lemmon	Mount Lemmon Survey	THM	2.3 km	MPC · JPL
394712	2008 ED_{13}	—	February 10, 2008	Kitt Peak	Spacewatch	·	2.8 km	MPC · JPL
394713	2008 EA_{34}	—	March 1, 2008	Mount Lemmon	Mount Lemmon Survey	·	3.0 km	MPC · JPL
394714	2008 ES_{40}	—	March 4, 2008	Kitt Peak	Spacewatch	·	2.6 km	MPC · JPL
394715	2008 EZ_{45}	—	March 5, 2008	Kitt Peak	Spacewatch	·	2.7 km	MPC · JPL
394716	2008 ER_{64}	—	March 9, 2008	Mount Lemmon	Mount Lemmon Survey	TIR	2.6 km	MPC · JPL
394717	2008 EA_{72}	—	December 20, 2007	Mount Lemmon	Mount Lemmon Survey	·	2.9 km	MPC · JPL
394718	2008 EM_{73}	—	March 7, 2008	Catalina	CSS	·	3.6 km	MPC · JPL
394719	2008 EN_{73}	—	March 7, 2008	Catalina	CSS	·	3.8 km	MPC · JPL
394720	2008 EM_{94}	—	February 11, 2008	Mount Lemmon	Mount Lemmon Survey	EOS	2.0 km	MPC · JPL
394721	2008 EM_{105}	—	February 13, 2008	Kitt Peak	Spacewatch	·	2.6 km	MPC · JPL
394722	2008 EN_{105}	—	January 11, 2008	Mount Lemmon	Mount Lemmon Survey	EOS	1.9 km	MPC · JPL
394723	2008 EL_{108}	—	February 12, 2008	Kitt Peak	Spacewatch	·	1.8 km	MPC · JPL
394724	2008 EV_{111}	—	March 8, 2008	Kitt Peak	Spacewatch	·	2.3 km	MPC · JPL
394725	2008 EQ_{118}	—	February 26, 2008	Mount Lemmon	Mount Lemmon Survey	·	2.6 km	MPC · JPL
394726	2008 EZ_{125}	—	March 10, 2008	Kitt Peak	Spacewatch	·	3.2 km	MPC · JPL
394727	2008 EZ_{131}	—	March 11, 2008	Kitt Peak	Spacewatch	·	4.1 km	MPC · JPL
394728	2008 EV_{133}	—	October 1, 2005	Mount Lemmon	Mount Lemmon Survey	·	2.7 km	MPC · JPL
394729	2008 EU_{134}	—	March 11, 2008	Kitt Peak	Spacewatch	THM	1.9 km	MPC · JPL
394730	2008 ER_{142}	—	February 7, 2008	Mount Lemmon	Mount Lemmon Survey	EOS	2.1 km	MPC · JPL
394731	2008 EV_{151}	—	March 10, 2008	Kitt Peak	Spacewatch	·	2.3 km	MPC · JPL
394732	2008 EP_{152}	—	March 10, 2008	Mount Lemmon	Mount Lemmon Survey	·	2.9 km	MPC · JPL
394733	2008 EG_{153}	—	March 11, 2008	Mount Lemmon	Mount Lemmon Survey	LIX	4.3 km	MPC · JPL
394734	2008 EH_{153}	—	March 11, 2008	Mount Lemmon	Mount Lemmon Survey	VER	2.7 km	MPC · JPL
394735	2008 EU_{162}	—	March 15, 2008	Kitt Peak	Spacewatch	·	2.6 km	MPC · JPL
394736	2008 EV_{166}	—	March 6, 2008	Mount Lemmon	Mount Lemmon Survey	·	3.3 km	MPC · JPL
394737	2008 EP_{168}	—	March 11, 2008	Kitt Peak	Spacewatch	·	2.9 km	MPC · JPL
394738	2008 EY_{168}	—	March 13, 2008	Catalina	CSS	·	5.4 km	MPC · JPL
394739	2008 FE_{13}	—	March 5, 2008	Kitt Peak	Spacewatch	·	2.5 km	MPC · JPL
394740	2008 FP_{23}	—	March 27, 2008	Kitt Peak	Spacewatch	VER	4.1 km	MPC · JPL
394741	2008 FJ_{25}	—	February 10, 2008	Kitt Peak	Spacewatch	·	2.2 km	MPC · JPL
394742	2008 FW_{31}	—	March 5, 2008	Mount Lemmon	Mount Lemmon Survey	·	2.9 km	MPC · JPL
394743	2008 FE_{32}	—	March 28, 2008	Mount Lemmon	Mount Lemmon Survey	HYG	2.3 km	MPC · JPL
394744	2008 FD_{33}	—	March 28, 2008	Mount Lemmon	Mount Lemmon Survey	·	2.1 km	MPC · JPL
394745	2008 FZ_{34}	—	February 9, 2008	Kitt Peak	Spacewatch	·	2.4 km	MPC · JPL
394746	2008 FD_{36}	—	February 28, 2008	Mount Lemmon	Mount Lemmon Survey	·	2.7 km	MPC · JPL
394747	2008 FL_{36}	—	March 28, 2008	Mount Lemmon	Mount Lemmon Survey	·	3.1 km	MPC · JPL
394748	2008 FJ_{39}	—	March 28, 2008	Kitt Peak	Spacewatch	·	3.2 km	MPC · JPL
394749	2008 FM_{47}	—	March 10, 2008	Kitt Peak	Spacewatch	·	3.2 km	MPC · JPL
394750	2008 FF_{51}	—	March 28, 2008	Mount Lemmon	Mount Lemmon Survey	·	2.1 km	MPC · JPL
394751	2008 FP_{55}	—	March 28, 2008	Mount Lemmon	Mount Lemmon Survey	·	2.7 km	MPC · JPL
394752	2008 FO_{94}	—	October 1, 2005	Kitt Peak	Spacewatch	EOS	1.9 km	MPC · JPL
394753	2008 FJ_{101}	—	March 30, 2008	Kitt Peak	Spacewatch	HYG	2.7 km	MPC · JPL
394754	2008 FD_{105}	—	February 26, 2008	Mount Lemmon	Mount Lemmon Survey	LIX	2.9 km	MPC · JPL
394755	2008 FM_{113}	—	March 31, 2008	Kitt Peak	Spacewatch	·	2.7 km	MPC · JPL
394756	2008 FS_{120}	—	March 31, 2008	Mount Lemmon	Mount Lemmon Survey	·	3.0 km	MPC · JPL
394757	2008 FD_{128}	—	March 28, 2008	Mount Lemmon	Mount Lemmon Survey	VER	2.7 km	MPC · JPL
394758	2008 FT_{133}	—	March 28, 2008	Mount Lemmon	Mount Lemmon Survey	·	2.7 km	MPC · JPL
394759	2008 FH_{134}	—	March 29, 2008	Mount Lemmon	Mount Lemmon Survey	·	4.5 km	MPC · JPL
394760	2008 GH_{17}	—	April 4, 2008	Kitt Peak	Spacewatch	·	2.8 km	MPC · JPL
394761	2008 GF_{18}	—	April 4, 2008	Kitt Peak	Spacewatch	·	2.8 km	MPC · JPL
394762	2008 GZ_{22}	—	April 1, 2008	Mount Lemmon	Mount Lemmon Survey	·	2.4 km	MPC · JPL
394763	2008 GO_{25}	—	April 1, 2008	Mount Lemmon	Mount Lemmon Survey	·	3.2 km	MPC · JPL
394764	2008 GG_{27}	—	April 3, 2008	Kitt Peak	Spacewatch	·	2.2 km	MPC · JPL
394765	2008 GH_{27}	—	February 9, 2008	Kitt Peak	Spacewatch	·	3.0 km	MPC · JPL
394766	2008 GH_{29}	—	March 13, 2008	Kitt Peak	Spacewatch	THM	2.1 km	MPC · JPL
394767	2008 GU_{29}	—	April 3, 2008	Mount Lemmon	Mount Lemmon Survey	THM	2.1 km	MPC · JPL
394768	2008 GB_{32}	—	March 26, 2008	Kitt Peak	Spacewatch	·	3.6 km	MPC · JPL
394769	2008 GP_{32}	—	April 3, 2008	Kitt Peak	Spacewatch	·	3.9 km	MPC · JPL
394770	2008 GO_{33}	—	April 3, 2008	Mount Lemmon	Mount Lemmon Survey	·	2.9 km	MPC · JPL
394771	2008 GG_{48}	—	March 2, 2008	XuYi	PMO NEO Survey Program	·	3.0 km	MPC · JPL
394772	2008 GR_{50}	—	April 5, 2008	Mount Lemmon	Mount Lemmon Survey	·	3.0 km	MPC · JPL
394773	2008 GX_{50}	—	April 5, 2008	Mount Lemmon	Mount Lemmon Survey	·	2.7 km	MPC · JPL
394774	2008 GG_{80}	—	March 27, 2008	Kitt Peak	Spacewatch	·	4.0 km	MPC · JPL
394775	2008 GM_{82}	—	April 8, 2008	Kitt Peak	Spacewatch	·	3.1 km	MPC · JPL
394776	2008 GW_{83}	—	March 12, 2008	Mount Lemmon	Mount Lemmon Survey	·	2.7 km	MPC · JPL
394777	2008 GP_{94}	—	March 27, 2008	Mount Lemmon	Mount Lemmon Survey	THM	1.8 km	MPC · JPL
394778	2008 GZ_{105}	—	March 5, 2008	Mount Lemmon	Mount Lemmon Survey	·	2.6 km	MPC · JPL
394779	2008 GZ_{106}	—	April 12, 2008	Catalina	CSS	·	3.4 km	MPC · JPL
394780	2008 GM_{114}	—	April 10, 2008	Catalina	CSS	·	3.6 km	MPC · JPL
394781	2008 GU_{131}	—	April 6, 2008	Mount Lemmon	Mount Lemmon Survey	·	4.5 km	MPC · JPL
394782	2008 GB_{142}	—	April 6, 2008	Catalina	CSS	·	5.1 km	MPC · JPL
394783	2008 HD_{3}	—	April 28, 2008	Kitt Peak	Spacewatch	APO	390 m	MPC · JPL
394784	2008 HG_{14}	—	April 25, 2008	Kitt Peak	Spacewatch	·	2.8 km	MPC · JPL
394785	2008 HQ_{18}	—	January 17, 2007	Kitt Peak	Spacewatch	CYB	3.7 km	MPC · JPL
394786	2008 HE_{40}	—	April 13, 2008	Mount Lemmon	Mount Lemmon Survey	·	2.8 km	MPC · JPL
394787	2008 HC_{42}	—	April 26, 2008	Mount Lemmon	Mount Lemmon Survey	CYB	4.4 km	MPC · JPL
394788	2008 HV_{55}	—	April 29, 2008	Kitt Peak	Spacewatch	·	950 m	MPC · JPL
394789	2008 HF_{57}	—	April 30, 2008	Kitt Peak	Spacewatch	·	4.2 km	MPC · JPL
394790	2008 KS_{28}	—	December 30, 2000	Socorro	LINEAR	T_{j} (2.99)	5.1 km	MPC · JPL
394791	2008 KO_{33}	—	May 5, 2008	Kitt Peak	Spacewatch	EOS	1.9 km	MPC · JPL
394792	2008 PR	—	August 1, 2008	Dauban	Kugel, F.	·	680 m	MPC · JPL
394793	2008 PR_{21}	—	August 6, 2008	Siding Spring	SSS	·	750 m	MPC · JPL
394794	2008 QV_{7}	—	August 26, 2008	Farra d'Isonzo	Farra d'Isonzo	·	770 m	MPC · JPL
394795	2008 QA_{38}	—	August 23, 2008	Kitt Peak	Spacewatch	·	670 m	MPC · JPL
394796	2008 QL_{39}	—	August 24, 2008	Kitt Peak	Spacewatch	·	720 m	MPC · JPL
394797	2008 QL_{45}	—	August 30, 2008	Socorro	LINEAR	·	930 m	MPC · JPL
394798	2008 RA_{8}	—	September 3, 2008	Kitt Peak	Spacewatch	L4	8.2 km	MPC · JPL
394799	2008 RN_{9}	—	September 3, 2008	Kitt Peak	Spacewatch	·	980 m	MPC · JPL
394800	2008 RL_{26}	—	September 8, 2008	Altschwendt	W. Ries	·	1.7 km	MPC · JPL

== 394801–394900 ==
back to top

Designation			Discovery			Properties		Ref
Permanent	Provisional	Named after	Date	Site	Discoverer(s)	Category	Diam.	Ref
394801	2008 RY_{43}	—	September 2, 2008	Kitt Peak	Spacewatch	·	670 m	MPC · JPL
394802	2008 RE_{50}	—	September 3, 2008	Kitt Peak	Spacewatch	·	1.1 km	MPC · JPL
394803	2008 RQ_{51}	—	September 3, 2008	Kitt Peak	Spacewatch	·	710 m	MPC · JPL
394804	2008 RS_{68}	—	September 4, 2008	Kitt Peak	Spacewatch	·	630 m	MPC · JPL
394805	2008 RY_{77}	—	September 6, 2008	Andrushivka	Andrushivka	·	700 m	MPC · JPL
394806	2008 RV_{97}	—	September 7, 2008	Mount Lemmon	Mount Lemmon Survey	·	1.0 km	MPC · JPL
394807	2008 RK_{107}	—	September 7, 2008	Catalina	CSS	·	870 m	MPC · JPL
394808	2008 RV_{124}	—	September 6, 2008	Kitt Peak	Spacewatch	L4	7.0 km	MPC · JPL
394809	2008 RP_{134}	—	September 5, 2008	Kitt Peak	Spacewatch	·	950 m	MPC · JPL
394810	2008 RB_{137}	—	September 4, 2008	Kitt Peak	Spacewatch	·	590 m	MPC · JPL
394811	2008 RJ_{137}	—	September 5, 2008	Socorro	LINEAR	·	940 m	MPC · JPL
394812	2008 SA_{4}	—	September 22, 2008	Socorro	LINEAR	·	1.5 km	MPC · JPL
394813	2008 SO_{17}	—	September 19, 2008	Kitt Peak	Spacewatch	·	820 m	MPC · JPL
394814	2008 SV_{19}	—	September 19, 2008	Kitt Peak	Spacewatch	·	1.0 km	MPC · JPL
394815	2008 SG_{21}	—	September 19, 2008	Kitt Peak	Spacewatch	·	740 m	MPC · JPL
394816	2008 SX_{23}	—	September 6, 2008	Mount Lemmon	Mount Lemmon Survey	·	610 m	MPC · JPL
394817	2008 SQ_{42}	—	September 20, 2008	Kitt Peak	Spacewatch	V	710 m	MPC · JPL
394818	2008 SX_{44}	—	September 20, 2008	Kitt Peak	Spacewatch	NYS	780 m	MPC · JPL
394819	2008 SJ_{48}	—	September 3, 2008	Kitt Peak	Spacewatch	V	560 m	MPC · JPL
394820	2008 SW_{55}	—	September 20, 2008	Kitt Peak	Spacewatch	V	590 m	MPC · JPL
394821	2008 SD_{74}	—	September 23, 2008	Kitt Peak	Spacewatch	L4	10 km	MPC · JPL
394822	2008 SZ_{88}	—	September 20, 2008	Kitt Peak	Spacewatch	·	720 m	MPC · JPL
394823	2008 SY_{107}	—	September 22, 2008	Kitt Peak	Spacewatch	·	660 m	MPC · JPL
394824	2008 SG_{112}	—	September 6, 2008	Catalina	CSS	·	910 m	MPC · JPL
394825	2008 SE_{127}	—	September 22, 2008	Kitt Peak	Spacewatch	·	1.0 km	MPC · JPL
394826	2008 SY_{137}	—	September 23, 2008	Kitt Peak	Spacewatch	·	1.1 km	MPC · JPL
394827	2008 SO_{139}	—	September 23, 2008	Siding Spring	SSS	(2076)	810 m	MPC · JPL
394828	2008 SU_{139}	—	December 8, 2005	Kitt Peak	Spacewatch	·	730 m	MPC · JPL
394829	2008 SH_{144}	—	September 5, 2008	Kitt Peak	Spacewatch	·	640 m	MPC · JPL
394830	2008 SF_{155}	—	September 3, 2008	Kitt Peak	Spacewatch	·	1.3 km	MPC · JPL
394831	2008 SX_{155}	—	September 23, 2008	Socorro	LINEAR	·	1.1 km	MPC · JPL
394832	2008 SO_{157}	—	September 24, 2008	Socorro	LINEAR	PHO	840 m	MPC · JPL
394833	2008 SN_{159}	—	September 24, 2008	Socorro	LINEAR	·	1.1 km	MPC · JPL
394834	2008 SF_{163}	—	September 28, 2008	Socorro	LINEAR	·	770 m	MPC · JPL
394835	2008 SN_{163}	—	September 28, 2008	Socorro	LINEAR	·	1.2 km	MPC · JPL
394836	2008 SD_{165}	—	September 28, 2008	Socorro	LINEAR	·	1.3 km	MPC · JPL
394837	2008 SF_{180}	—	September 24, 2008	Mount Lemmon	Mount Lemmon Survey	·	830 m	MPC · JPL
394838	2008 SL_{189}	—	September 25, 2008	Kitt Peak	Spacewatch	·	620 m	MPC · JPL
394839	2008 SS_{215}	—	September 29, 2008	Mount Lemmon	Mount Lemmon Survey	·	1.1 km	MPC · JPL
394840	2008 SV_{224}	—	September 22, 2008	Mount Lemmon	Mount Lemmon Survey	·	1.2 km	MPC · JPL
394841	2008 SU_{234}	—	September 28, 2008	Mount Lemmon	Mount Lemmon Survey	·	560 m	MPC · JPL
394842	2008 SP_{238}	—	September 29, 2008	Kitt Peak	Spacewatch	·	720 m	MPC · JPL
394843	2008 SZ_{241}	—	September 21, 2008	Catalina	CSS	·	820 m	MPC · JPL
394844	2008 SM_{249}	—	September 22, 2008	Kitt Peak	Spacewatch	V	780 m	MPC · JPL
394845	2008 SG_{251}	—	September 24, 2008	Kitt Peak	Spacewatch	V	610 m	MPC · JPL
394846	2008 SN_{251}	—	September 25, 2008	Kitt Peak	Spacewatch	·	1.2 km	MPC · JPL
394847	2008 SZ_{271}	—	September 29, 2008	Mount Lemmon	Mount Lemmon Survey	V	690 m	MPC · JPL
394848	2008 SE_{273}	—	September 22, 2008	Mount Lemmon	Mount Lemmon Survey	·	1.3 km	MPC · JPL
394849	2008 SW_{277}	—	September 25, 2008	Kitt Peak	Spacewatch	·	1.4 km	MPC · JPL
394850	2008 SP_{300}	—	September 23, 2008	Catalina	CSS	PHO	1.1 km	MPC · JPL
394851	2008 SU_{309}	—	September 27, 2008	Mount Lemmon	Mount Lemmon Survey	(5)	1.2 km	MPC · JPL
394852	2008 TV_{32}	—	October 1, 2008	Kitt Peak	Spacewatch	V	790 m	MPC · JPL
394853	2008 TS_{36}	—	October 1, 2008	Mount Lemmon	Mount Lemmon Survey	·	1.1 km	MPC · JPL
394854	2008 TT_{44}	—	October 1, 2008	Mount Lemmon	Mount Lemmon Survey	·	700 m	MPC · JPL
394855	2008 TG_{49}	—	November 12, 2005	Kitt Peak	Spacewatch	·	720 m	MPC · JPL
394856	2008 TL_{58}	—	September 20, 2008	Kitt Peak	Spacewatch	·	610 m	MPC · JPL
394857	2008 TQ_{67}	—	October 2, 2008	Kitt Peak	Spacewatch	MAS	830 m	MPC · JPL
394858	2008 TE_{71}	—	September 23, 2008	Kitt Peak	Spacewatch	·	1.3 km	MPC · JPL
394859	2008 TF_{74}	—	October 2, 2008	Kitt Peak	Spacewatch	·	1.1 km	MPC · JPL
394860	2008 TL_{85}	—	October 3, 2008	Mount Lemmon	Mount Lemmon Survey	·	590 m	MPC · JPL
394861	2008 TT_{115}	—	October 6, 2008	Catalina	CSS	·	1.4 km	MPC · JPL
394862	2008 TB_{116}	—	October 6, 2008	Catalina	CSS	·	800 m	MPC · JPL
394863	2008 TE_{116}	—	October 6, 2008	Catalina	CSS	·	1.6 km	MPC · JPL
394864	2008 TG_{118}	—	October 6, 2008	Kitt Peak	Spacewatch	·	1.4 km	MPC · JPL
394865	2008 TD_{130}	—	October 8, 2008	Mount Lemmon	Mount Lemmon Survey	·	1.7 km	MPC · JPL
394866	2008 TO_{136}	—	October 8, 2008	Kitt Peak	Spacewatch	NYS	1.3 km	MPC · JPL
394867	2008 TF_{158}	—	September 23, 2008	Mount Lemmon	Mount Lemmon Survey	·	690 m	MPC · JPL
394868	2008 TQ_{167}	—	October 10, 2008	Mount Lemmon	Mount Lemmon Survey	·	1.7 km	MPC · JPL
394869	2008 TP_{173}	—	October 1, 2008	Mount Lemmon	Mount Lemmon Survey	L4	8.0 km	MPC · JPL
394870	2008 TD_{180}	—	April 13, 2004	Kitt Peak	Spacewatch	·	860 m	MPC · JPL
394871	2008 TH_{181}	—	October 8, 2008	Mount Lemmon	Mount Lemmon Survey	·	1.3 km	MPC · JPL
394872	2008 TN_{185}	—	October 6, 2008	Mount Lemmon	Mount Lemmon Survey	·	1.1 km	MPC · JPL
394873	2008 TC_{189}	—	October 10, 2008	Mount Lemmon	Mount Lemmon Survey	·	770 m	MPC · JPL
394874	2008 UF_{3}	—	September 23, 2008	Mount Lemmon	Mount Lemmon Survey	·	1.4 km	MPC · JPL
394875	2008 UU_{9}	—	October 10, 2004	Kitt Peak	Spacewatch	(5)	1.3 km	MPC · JPL
394876	2008 UG_{18}	—	October 19, 2008	Kitt Peak	Spacewatch	·	1.2 km	MPC · JPL
394877	2008 UC_{35}	—	October 20, 2008	Kitt Peak	Spacewatch	V	740 m	MPC · JPL
394878	2008 UH_{61}	—	October 21, 2008	Kitt Peak	Spacewatch	V	700 m	MPC · JPL
394879	2008 UL_{66}	—	October 21, 2008	Kitt Peak	Spacewatch	(2076)	1.1 km	MPC · JPL
394880	2008 UZ_{76}	—	October 21, 2008	Kitt Peak	Spacewatch	·	1.2 km	MPC · JPL
394881	2008 UW_{93}	—	October 7, 2008	Catalina	CSS	·	1.9 km	MPC · JPL
394882	2008 UM_{115}	—	October 22, 2008	Kitt Peak	Spacewatch	·	1.4 km	MPC · JPL
394883	2008 UH_{142}	—	October 2, 2008	Mount Lemmon	Mount Lemmon Survey	·	1.2 km	MPC · JPL
394884	2008 UC_{146}	—	April 16, 2007	Mount Lemmon	Mount Lemmon Survey	·	670 m	MPC · JPL
394885	2008 UR_{146}	—	October 23, 2008	Kitt Peak	Spacewatch	·	1.7 km	MPC · JPL
394886	2008 UB_{147}	—	October 23, 2008	Kitt Peak	Spacewatch	NYS	1 km	MPC · JPL
394887	2008 UV_{148}	—	October 23, 2008	Kitt Peak	Spacewatch	·	1.2 km	MPC · JPL
394888	2008 UB_{176}	—	October 24, 2008	Mount Lemmon	Mount Lemmon Survey	·	750 m	MPC · JPL
394889	2008 UP_{182}	—	October 24, 2008	Mount Lemmon	Mount Lemmon Survey	·	1.3 km	MPC · JPL
394890	2008 UK_{185}	—	October 24, 2008	Kitt Peak	Spacewatch	·	1.5 km	MPC · JPL
394891	2008 UC_{188}	—	October 24, 2008	Kitt Peak	Spacewatch	NYS	850 m	MPC · JPL
394892	2008 UE_{192}	—	October 25, 2008	Catalina	CSS	V	740 m	MPC · JPL
394893	2008 UP_{201}	—	October 9, 2008	Mount Lemmon	Mount Lemmon Survey	·	1.2 km	MPC · JPL
394894	2008 UW_{219}	—	October 25, 2008	Kitt Peak	Spacewatch	·	1.1 km	MPC · JPL
394895	2008 UN_{222}	—	October 25, 2008	Kitt Peak	Spacewatch	·	1.3 km	MPC · JPL
394896	2008 UH_{248}	—	October 26, 2008	Kitt Peak	Spacewatch	·	1.7 km	MPC · JPL
394897	2008 UH_{267}	—	September 4, 2008	Kitt Peak	Spacewatch	·	1.1 km	MPC · JPL
394898	2008 UB_{272}	—	October 20, 2008	Kitt Peak	Spacewatch	(5)	1.3 km	MPC · JPL
394899	2008 UL_{298}	—	October 29, 2008	Kitt Peak	Spacewatch	·	1.6 km	MPC · JPL
394900	2008 UT_{298}	—	October 29, 2008	Kitt Peak	Spacewatch	·	1.1 km	MPC · JPL

== 394901–395000 ==
back to top

Designation			Discovery			Properties		Ref
Permanent	Provisional	Named after	Date	Site	Discoverer(s)	Category	Diam.	Ref
394901	2008 UZ_{308}	—	October 30, 2008	Kitt Peak	Spacewatch	·	1.1 km	MPC · JPL
394902	2008 UT_{338}	—	October 22, 2008	Kitt Peak	Spacewatch	·	1.5 km	MPC · JPL
394903	2008 UL_{352}	—	October 31, 2008	Mount Lemmon	Mount Lemmon Survey	·	1.9 km	MPC · JPL
394904	2008 UW_{354}	—	October 28, 2008	Kitt Peak	Spacewatch	V	680 m	MPC · JPL
394905	2008 US_{367}	—	March 13, 2007	Mount Lemmon	Mount Lemmon Survey	·	900 m	MPC · JPL
394906	2008 UV_{368}	—	October 26, 2008	Mount Lemmon	Mount Lemmon Survey	·	1.5 km	MPC · JPL
394907	2008 UY_{369}	—	September 25, 2008	Mount Lemmon	Mount Lemmon Survey	V	780 m	MPC · JPL
394908	2008 VG_{24}	—	November 1, 2008	Kitt Peak	Spacewatch	·	1.5 km	MPC · JPL
394909	2008 VZ_{38}	—	November 2, 2008	Kitt Peak	Spacewatch	SUL	2.6 km	MPC · JPL
394910	2008 VL_{47}	—	November 3, 2008	Mount Lemmon	Mount Lemmon Survey	·	2.0 km	MPC · JPL
394911	2008 VX_{54}	—	August 25, 2004	Kitt Peak	Spacewatch	·	980 m	MPC · JPL
394912	2008 VP_{59}	—	November 7, 2008	Catalina	CSS	V	710 m	MPC · JPL
394913	2008 VJ_{68}	—	November 2, 2008	Mount Lemmon	Mount Lemmon Survey	·	1.6 km	MPC · JPL
394914	2008 VO_{78}	—	November 7, 2008	Mount Lemmon	Mount Lemmon Survey	·	1.5 km	MPC · JPL
394915	2008 VL_{79}	—	November 6, 2008	Kitt Peak	Spacewatch	·	1.3 km	MPC · JPL
394916	2008 VT_{79}	—	November 1, 2008	Mount Lemmon	Mount Lemmon Survey	(5)	1.3 km	MPC · JPL
394917	2008 VG_{80}	—	November 7, 2008	Mount Lemmon	Mount Lemmon Survey	·	1.6 km	MPC · JPL
394918	2008 WD_{11}	—	November 18, 2008	Catalina	CSS	·	1.2 km	MPC · JPL
394919	2008 WN_{27}	—	October 23, 2008	Kitt Peak	Spacewatch	·	1.4 km	MPC · JPL
394920	2008 WN_{47}	—	October 26, 2008	Kitt Peak	Spacewatch	JUN	950 m	MPC · JPL
394921	2008 WR_{65}	—	November 17, 2008	Kitt Peak	Spacewatch	·	1.5 km	MPC · JPL
394922	2008 WM_{66}	—	November 18, 2008	Kitt Peak	Spacewatch	V	650 m	MPC · JPL
394923	2008 WY_{67}	—	October 27, 2008	Kitt Peak	Spacewatch	·	1.6 km	MPC · JPL
394924	2008 WU_{78}	—	September 29, 2008	Mount Lemmon	Mount Lemmon Survey	·	1.7 km	MPC · JPL
394925	2008 WV_{79}	—	September 29, 2008	Mount Lemmon	Mount Lemmon Survey	·	1.3 km	MPC · JPL
394926	2008 WP_{81}	—	November 20, 2008	Kitt Peak	Spacewatch	·	1.1 km	MPC · JPL
394927	2008 WU_{85}	—	November 20, 2008	Kitt Peak	Spacewatch	(5)	1.1 km	MPC · JPL
394928	2008 WN_{91}	—	November 23, 2008	Mount Lemmon	Mount Lemmon Survey	·	2.6 km	MPC · JPL
394929	2008 WO_{92}	—	November 25, 2008	Dauban	Kugel, F.	·	1.9 km	MPC · JPL
394930	2008 WV_{94}	—	November 26, 2008	Farra d'Isonzo	Farra d'Isonzo	·	850 m	MPC · JPL
394931	2008 WV_{101}	—	November 30, 2008	Socorro	LINEAR	·	1.4 km	MPC · JPL
394932	2008 WG_{106}	—	October 21, 2008	Mount Lemmon	Mount Lemmon Survey	·	970 m	MPC · JPL
394933	2008 WX_{112}	—	October 26, 2008	Kitt Peak	Spacewatch	·	1.1 km	MPC · JPL
394934	2008 WG_{120}	—	November 24, 2008	Kitt Peak	Spacewatch	·	1.4 km	MPC · JPL
394935	2008 WA_{133}	—	January 9, 2006	Kitt Peak	Spacewatch	·	1.2 km	MPC · JPL
394936	2008 WK_{134}	—	November 21, 2008	Catalina	CSS	·	2.8 km	MPC · JPL
394937	2008 WD_{137}	—	November 22, 2008	Kitt Peak	Spacewatch	·	1.5 km	MPC · JPL
394938	2008 XY_{1}	—	December 4, 2008	Socorro	LINEAR	·	2.2 km	MPC · JPL
394939	2008 XP_{39}	—	December 2, 2008	Kitt Peak	Spacewatch	·	850 m	MPC · JPL
394940	2008 XT_{41}	—	December 2, 2008	Kitt Peak	Spacewatch	·	940 m	MPC · JPL
394941	2008 XK_{43}	—	December 2, 2008	Kitt Peak	Spacewatch	·	1.2 km	MPC · JPL
394942	2008 XK_{53}	—	December 5, 2008	Mount Lemmon	Mount Lemmon Survey	·	1.8 km	MPC · JPL
394943	2008 XT_{55}	—	December 1, 2008	Socorro	LINEAR	·	1.6 km	MPC · JPL
394944	2008 YR_{8}	—	November 6, 2008	Mount Lemmon	Mount Lemmon Survey	·	920 m	MPC · JPL
394945	2008 YV_{14}	—	October 23, 2008	Kitt Peak	Spacewatch	·	1.1 km	MPC · JPL
394946	2008 YZ_{23}	—	December 21, 2008	Catalina	CSS	·	1.6 km	MPC · JPL
394947	2008 YE_{33}	—	December 31, 2008	Mayhill	Lowe, A.	·	1.0 km	MPC · JPL
394948	2008 YG_{48}	—	December 21, 2008	Mount Lemmon	Mount Lemmon Survey	JUN	1.1 km	MPC · JPL
394949	2008 YR_{51}	—	December 29, 2008	Mount Lemmon	Mount Lemmon Survey	EUN	1.5 km	MPC · JPL
394950	2008 YH_{57}	—	December 30, 2008	Kitt Peak	Spacewatch	·	1.4 km	MPC · JPL
394951	2008 YF_{59}	—	December 30, 2008	Kitt Peak	Spacewatch	EUN	1.5 km	MPC · JPL
394952	2008 YW_{59}	—	December 30, 2008	Kitt Peak	Spacewatch	·	1.2 km	MPC · JPL
394953	2008 YB_{63}	—	December 30, 2008	Mount Lemmon	Mount Lemmon Survey	·	1.6 km	MPC · JPL
394954	2008 YE_{68}	—	December 30, 2008	Mount Lemmon	Mount Lemmon Survey	·	1.2 km	MPC · JPL
394955	2008 YJ_{68}	—	September 30, 2003	Kitt Peak	Spacewatch	EUN	1.4 km	MPC · JPL
394956	2008 YV_{76}	—	December 30, 2008	Mount Lemmon	Mount Lemmon Survey	·	2.0 km	MPC · JPL
394957	2008 YT_{97}	—	December 29, 2008	Mount Lemmon	Mount Lemmon Survey	·	1.1 km	MPC · JPL
394958	2008 YW_{102}	—	December 29, 2008	Kitt Peak	Spacewatch	·	1.0 km	MPC · JPL
394959	2008 YA_{108}	—	December 29, 2008	Kitt Peak	Spacewatch	MAR	960 m	MPC · JPL
394960	2008 YC_{110}	—	December 30, 2008	Kitt Peak	Spacewatch	·	1.1 km	MPC · JPL
394961	2008 YY_{113}	—	December 4, 2008	Mount Lemmon	Mount Lemmon Survey	·	1.4 km	MPC · JPL
394962	2008 YH_{115}	—	November 20, 2008	Mount Lemmon	Mount Lemmon Survey	·	1.5 km	MPC · JPL
394963	2008 YP_{119}	—	December 22, 2008	Kitt Peak	Spacewatch	·	1.2 km	MPC · JPL
394964	2008 YT_{127}	—	December 30, 2008	Kitt Peak	Spacewatch	·	1.2 km	MPC · JPL
394965	2008 YO_{135}	—	December 30, 2008	Kitt Peak	Spacewatch	·	1.1 km	MPC · JPL
394966	2008 YW_{140}	—	December 30, 2008	Mount Lemmon	Mount Lemmon Survey	·	1.2 km	MPC · JPL
394967	2008 YO_{143}	—	December 22, 2008	Mount Lemmon	Mount Lemmon Survey	NYS	1.6 km	MPC · JPL
394968	2008 YC_{155}	—	December 22, 2008	Catalina	CSS	·	1.9 km	MPC · JPL
394969	2008 YG_{163}	—	December 30, 2008	Kitt Peak	Spacewatch	KOR	1.1 km	MPC · JPL
394970	2008 YG_{167}	—	December 21, 2008	Socorro	LINEAR	(5)	1.1 km	MPC · JPL
394971	2008 YH_{170}	—	December 22, 2008	Kitt Peak	Spacewatch	·	990 m	MPC · JPL
394972	2008 YD_{173}	—	December 30, 2008	Mount Lemmon	Mount Lemmon Survey	·	1.8 km	MPC · JPL
394973	2009 AL_{2}	—	December 22, 2008	Mount Lemmon	Mount Lemmon Survey	·	1.3 km	MPC · JPL
394974	2009 AK_{7}	—	December 3, 2008	Mount Lemmon	Mount Lemmon Survey	·	1.4 km	MPC · JPL
394975	2009 AY_{11}	—	December 21, 2008	Mount Lemmon	Mount Lemmon Survey	HNS	1.5 km	MPC · JPL
394976	2009 AK_{16}	—	January 15, 2009	Calar Alto	F. Hormuth	ADE	1.9 km	MPC · JPL
394977	2009 AZ_{21}	—	December 21, 2008	Mount Lemmon	Mount Lemmon Survey	·	1.1 km	MPC · JPL
394978	2009 AK_{22}	—	January 3, 2009	Kitt Peak	Spacewatch	·	1.1 km	MPC · JPL
394979	2009 AP_{27}	—	December 29, 2008	Kitt Peak	Spacewatch	·	1.3 km	MPC · JPL
394980	2009 AF_{49}	—	November 8, 2008	Mount Lemmon	Mount Lemmon Survey	·	1.4 km	MPC · JPL
394981	2009 BF_{4}	—	January 18, 2009	Socorro	LINEAR	·	1.9 km	MPC · JPL
394982	2009 BZ_{15}	—	January 16, 2009	Mount Lemmon	Mount Lemmon Survey	·	2.7 km	MPC · JPL
394983	2009 BZ_{16}	—	January 17, 2009	Kitt Peak	Spacewatch	·	1.8 km	MPC · JPL
394984	2009 BC_{18}	—	December 29, 2008	Mount Lemmon	Mount Lemmon Survey	·	1.9 km	MPC · JPL
394985	2009 BA_{19}	—	January 16, 2009	Mount Lemmon	Mount Lemmon Survey	·	1.1 km	MPC · JPL
394986	2009 BZ_{24}	—	January 18, 2009	Kitt Peak	Spacewatch	EUN	1.1 km	MPC · JPL
394987	2009 BH_{26}	—	January 16, 2009	Kitt Peak	Spacewatch	·	1.3 km	MPC · JPL
394988	2009 BH_{34}	—	January 16, 2009	Kitt Peak	Spacewatch	·	1.1 km	MPC · JPL
394989	2009 BH_{37}	—	January 16, 2009	Kitt Peak	Spacewatch	·	1.4 km	MPC · JPL
394990	2009 BW_{40}	—	January 16, 2009	Kitt Peak	Spacewatch	(5)	1.1 km	MPC · JPL
394991	2009 BV_{51}	—	January 16, 2009	Mount Lemmon	Mount Lemmon Survey	·	1.3 km	MPC · JPL
394992	2009 BW_{58}	—	February 1, 2005	Kitt Peak	Spacewatch	·	1.4 km	MPC · JPL
394993	2009 BC_{59}	—	January 16, 2009	Mount Lemmon	Mount Lemmon Survey	MAS	990 m	MPC · JPL
394994	2009 BA_{60}	—	December 29, 2008	Kitt Peak	Spacewatch	·	1.3 km	MPC · JPL
394995	2009 BN_{63}	—	January 20, 2009	Kitt Peak	Spacewatch	·	1.6 km	MPC · JPL
394996	2009 BT_{66}	—	January 20, 2009	Kitt Peak	Spacewatch	·	1.7 km	MPC · JPL
394997	2009 BG_{71}	—	January 26, 2009	Purple Mountain	PMO NEO Survey Program	·	3.1 km	MPC · JPL
394998	2009 BQ_{77}	—	January 25, 2009	Socorro	LINEAR	·	1.7 km	MPC · JPL
394999	2009 BJ_{85}	—	January 25, 2009	Kitt Peak	Spacewatch	·	1.7 km	MPC · JPL
395000	2009 BV_{95}	—	January 26, 2009	Mount Lemmon	Mount Lemmon Survey	·	1.6 km	MPC · JPL

back to top

== See also ==
- Meanings of minor-planet names: 394001–395000
