= List of minor planets: 396001–397000 =

The following is a partial list of minor planets, running from minor-planet number 396001 through 397000, inclusive. The primary data for this and other partial lists is based on JPL's "Small-Body Orbital Elements" and data available from the Minor Planet Center. Critical list information is also provided by the MPC, unless otherwise specified from Lowell Observatory. A detailed description of the table's columns and additional sources are given on the main page including a complete list of every page in this series, and a statistical break-up on the dynamical classification of minor planets.

Also see the summary list of all named bodies in numerical and alphabetical order, and the corresponding naming citations for the number range of this particular list. New namings may only be added to this list after official publication, as the preannouncement of names is condemned by the Working Group for Small Bodies Nomenclature of the International Astronomical Union.

Near-Earth obj.	MBA (inner)	MBA (outer)	Centaur
Mars-crosser	MBA (middle)	Jupiter trojan	Trans-Neptunian obj.
Unclassified

== 396001–396100 ==
Designation			Discovery			Properties		Ref
Permanent	Provisional	Named after	Date	Site	Discoverer(s)	Category	Diam.	Ref
396001	2013 BL_{56}	—	May 4, 2005	Kitt Peak	Spacewatch	·	2.1 km	MPC · JPL
396002	2013 BA_{58}	—	August 24, 2007	Kitt Peak	Spacewatch	·	990 m	MPC · JPL
396003	2013 BQ_{58}	—	July 11, 1997	Kitt Peak	Spacewatch	·	880 m	MPC · JPL
396004	2013 BW_{59}	—	April 13, 2010	WISE	WISE	·	4.0 km	MPC · JPL
396005	2013 BE_{60}	—	November 24, 2006	Kitt Peak	Spacewatch	·	2.9 km	MPC · JPL
396006	2013 BW_{60}	—	February 9, 2008	Kitt Peak	Spacewatch	EMA	3.1 km	MPC · JPL
396007	2013 BC_{62}	—	October 23, 2006	Kitt Peak	Spacewatch	·	1.5 km	MPC · JPL
396008	2013 BD_{64}	—	January 9, 2013	Kitt Peak	Spacewatch	EOS	2.3 km	MPC · JPL
396009	2013 BJ_{65}	—	January 11, 2008	Kitt Peak	Spacewatch	KOR	1.3 km	MPC · JPL
396010	2013 BO_{66}	—	September 7, 2011	Kitt Peak	Spacewatch	·	1.4 km	MPC · JPL
396011	2013 BZ_{66}	—	March 18, 2001	Kitt Peak	Spacewatch	·	1.4 km	MPC · JPL
396012	2013 BE_{67}	—	March 19, 2009	Kitt Peak	Spacewatch	·	1.6 km	MPC · JPL
396013	2013 BK_{69}	—	October 14, 1999	Kitt Peak	Spacewatch	·	1.0 km	MPC · JPL
396014	2013 BK_{72}	—	January 15, 1999	Kitt Peak	Spacewatch	AST	1.7 km	MPC · JPL
396015	2013 BY_{76}	—	December 22, 2008	Kitt Peak	Spacewatch	·	1.4 km	MPC · JPL
396016	2013 BA_{77}	—	October 25, 2005	Kitt Peak	Spacewatch	·	2.8 km	MPC · JPL
396017	2013 BT_{78}	—	November 10, 2006	Kitt Peak	Spacewatch	LIX	3.7 km	MPC · JPL
396018	2013 BH_{80}	—	June 12, 2010	WISE	WISE	URS	3.7 km	MPC · JPL
396019	2013 BP_{80}	—	May 22, 1998	Kitt Peak	Spacewatch	·	3.3 km	MPC · JPL
396020	2013 BU_{80}	—	October 19, 2007	Catalina	CSS	·	2.2 km	MPC · JPL
396021	2013 BY_{80}	—	November 16, 2006	Mount Lemmon	Mount Lemmon Survey	·	2.7 km	MPC · JPL
396022	2013 BF_{81}	—	January 26, 2006	Mount Lemmon	Mount Lemmon Survey	·	1.4 km	MPC · JPL
396023	2013 CF_{2}	—	April 7, 2005	Mount Lemmon	Mount Lemmon Survey	·	2.0 km	MPC · JPL
396024	2013 CK_{4}	—	August 27, 2006	Kitt Peak	Spacewatch	·	2.1 km	MPC · JPL
396025	2013 CJ_{5}	—	September 15, 2006	Kitt Peak	Spacewatch	·	1.4 km	MPC · JPL
396026	2013 CG_{7}	—	April 25, 2000	Kitt Peak	Spacewatch	AGN · fast	1.6 km	MPC · JPL
396027	2013 CP_{8}	—	June 10, 2010	Mount Lemmon	Mount Lemmon Survey	·	3.1 km	MPC · JPL
396028	2013 CS_{8}	—	February 7, 2008	Kitt Peak	Spacewatch	·	2.8 km	MPC · JPL
396029	2013 CF_{10}	—	May 8, 2005	Kitt Peak	Spacewatch	·	1.8 km	MPC · JPL
396030	2013 CH_{11}	—	December 25, 1998	Kitt Peak	Spacewatch	AGN	1.3 km	MPC · JPL
396031	2013 CW_{12}	—	January 20, 2002	Kitt Peak	Spacewatch	·	2.6 km	MPC · JPL
396032	2013 CQ_{13}	—	February 28, 2008	Mount Lemmon	Mount Lemmon Survey	·	2.4 km	MPC · JPL
396033	2013 CW_{13}	—	October 16, 2006	Kitt Peak	Spacewatch	·	1.7 km	MPC · JPL
396034	2013 CW_{15}	—	September 15, 2006	Kitt Peak	Spacewatch	·	2.0 km	MPC · JPL
396035	2013 CE_{16}	—	October 16, 2006	Mount Lemmon	Mount Lemmon Survey	AGN	1.4 km	MPC · JPL
396036	2013 CV_{16}	—	March 12, 2008	Kitt Peak	Spacewatch	·	3.4 km	MPC · JPL
396037	2013 CP_{21}	—	November 16, 2006	Mount Lemmon	Mount Lemmon Survey	HYG	2.4 km	MPC · JPL
396038	2013 CH_{23}	—	April 21, 2010	WISE	WISE	GEF	2.1 km	MPC · JPL
396039	2013 CP_{23}	—	September 12, 2005	Kitt Peak	Spacewatch	·	3.0 km	MPC · JPL
396040	2013 CW_{29}	—	September 17, 2009	Kitt Peak	Spacewatch	3:2 · SHU	5.9 km	MPC · JPL
396041	2013 CK_{31}	—	November 5, 1994	Kitt Peak	Spacewatch	EOS	2.2 km	MPC · JPL
396042	2013 CM_{31}	—	December 17, 2001	Socorro	LINEAR	·	2.5 km	MPC · JPL
396043	2013 CN_{33}	—	September 1, 2011	Siding Spring	SSS	EUP	4.3 km	MPC · JPL
396044	2013 CH_{35}	—	February 22, 2004	Kitt Peak	Spacewatch	·	2.1 km	MPC · JPL
396045	2013 CH_{37}	—	October 21, 2006	Mount Lemmon	Mount Lemmon Survey	·	3.7 km	MPC · JPL
396046	2013 CK_{37}	—	November 7, 2007	Mount Lemmon	Mount Lemmon Survey	·	4.6 km	MPC · JPL
396047	2013 CH_{38}	—	December 10, 2006	Kitt Peak	Spacewatch	·	3.2 km	MPC · JPL
396048	2013 CD_{39}	—	March 23, 2003	Kitt Peak	Spacewatch	·	1.7 km	MPC · JPL
396049	2013 CF_{40}	—	January 5, 2002	Kitt Peak	Spacewatch	·	4.7 km	MPC · JPL
396050	2013 CA_{41}	—	March 7, 2008	Kitt Peak	Spacewatch	·	2.8 km	MPC · JPL
396051	2013 CL_{41}	—	July 18, 2006	Mount Lemmon	Mount Lemmon Survey	·	2.0 km	MPC · JPL
396052	2013 CY_{41}	—	July 20, 2010	WISE	WISE	·	3.2 km	MPC · JPL
396053	2013 CR_{43}	—	October 2, 2006	Mount Lemmon	Mount Lemmon Survey	KOR	1.3 km	MPC · JPL
396054	2013 CD_{44}	—	November 11, 2007	Mount Lemmon	Mount Lemmon Survey	AGN	1.2 km	MPC · JPL
396055	2013 CJ_{45}	—	August 29, 2006	Kitt Peak	Spacewatch	HOF	2.7 km	MPC · JPL
396056	2013 CH_{49}	—	April 29, 2009	Kitt Peak	Spacewatch	·	2.8 km	MPC · JPL
396057	2013 CM_{49}	—	January 20, 2008	Mount Lemmon	Mount Lemmon Survey	·	3.6 km	MPC · JPL
396058	2013 CY_{49}	—	February 10, 2008	Catalina	CSS	·	1.8 km	MPC · JPL
396059	2013 CH_{51}	—	August 27, 2006	Kitt Peak	Spacewatch	·	3.1 km	MPC · JPL
396060	2013 CA_{52}	—	September 28, 2006	Kitt Peak	Spacewatch	·	1.6 km	MPC · JPL
396061	2013 CL_{55}	—	April 8, 2008	Mount Lemmon	Mount Lemmon Survey	·	3.0 km	MPC · JPL
396062	2013 CM_{63}	—	March 1, 2009	Kitt Peak	Spacewatch	·	2.2 km	MPC · JPL
396063	2013 CB_{66}	—	January 12, 2002	Kitt Peak	Spacewatch	·	2.8 km	MPC · JPL
396064	2013 CP_{69}	—	September 15, 2006	Kitt Peak	Spacewatch	·	1.9 km	MPC · JPL
396065	2013 CC_{70}	—	February 10, 2002	Socorro	LINEAR	EOS ·	4.2 km	MPC · JPL
396066	2013 CD_{71}	—	June 15, 2010	WISE	WISE	·	4.7 km	MPC · JPL
396067	2013 CV_{71}	—	September 17, 2006	Kitt Peak	Spacewatch	·	1.7 km	MPC · JPL
396068	2013 CU_{72}	—	February 11, 2008	Mount Lemmon	Mount Lemmon Survey	·	3.4 km	MPC · JPL
396069	2013 CA_{73}	—	May 26, 2003	Kitt Peak	Spacewatch	V	670 m	MPC · JPL
396070	2013 CB_{73}	—	January 15, 2008	Mount Lemmon	Mount Lemmon Survey	·	2.0 km	MPC · JPL
396071	2013 CE_{74}	—	February 14, 2004	Kitt Peak	Spacewatch	·	1.9 km	MPC · JPL
396072	2013 CJ_{74}	—	March 6, 2008	Mount Lemmon	Mount Lemmon Survey	·	3.0 km	MPC · JPL
396073	2013 CG_{76}	—	December 23, 1998	Kitt Peak	Spacewatch	·	810 m	MPC · JPL
396074	2013 CW_{77}	—	December 20, 2007	Mount Lemmon	Mount Lemmon Survey	·	2.2 km	MPC · JPL
396075	2013 CD_{81}	—	September 12, 1994	Kitt Peak	Spacewatch	·	2.9 km	MPC · JPL
396076	2013 CA_{82}	—	March 15, 2004	Kitt Peak	Spacewatch	·	2.3 km	MPC · JPL
396077	2013 CN_{84}	—	April 16, 2005	Catalina	CSS	MAR	1.3 km	MPC · JPL
396078	2013 CS_{84}	—	October 21, 2006	Mount Lemmon	Mount Lemmon Survey	KOR	1.3 km	MPC · JPL
396079	2013 CH_{85}	—	March 3, 2009	Kitt Peak	Spacewatch	·	1.8 km	MPC · JPL
396080	2013 CO_{85}	—	January 15, 2005	Kitt Peak	Spacewatch	·	1.2 km	MPC · JPL
396081	2013 CC_{86}	—	February 2, 2009	Kitt Peak	Spacewatch	·	1.9 km	MPC · JPL
396082	2013 CR_{89}	—	November 23, 2006	Mount Lemmon	Mount Lemmon Survey	·	3.7 km	MPC · JPL
396083	2013 CT_{89}	—	March 30, 2008	Catalina	CSS	·	3.1 km	MPC · JPL
396084	2013 CH_{91}	—	February 4, 2005	Mount Lemmon	Mount Lemmon Survey	3:2	5.7 km	MPC · JPL
396085	2013 CJ_{92}	—	October 12, 2007	Mount Lemmon	Mount Lemmon Survey	·	1.4 km	MPC · JPL
396086	2013 CO_{100}	—	April 5, 2003	Kitt Peak	Spacewatch	·	2.5 km	MPC · JPL
396087	2013 CW_{101}	—	February 7, 2002	Socorro	LINEAR	·	4.0 km	MPC · JPL
396088	2013 CD_{110}	—	December 17, 2007	Kitt Peak	Spacewatch	·	2.2 km	MPC · JPL
396089	2013 CJ_{110}	—	February 7, 2002	Socorro	LINEAR	·	3.8 km	MPC · JPL
396090	2013 CG_{112}	—	September 15, 2007	Siding Spring	SSS	BAR	1.2 km	MPC · JPL
396091	2013 CV_{112}	—	June 3, 2009	Mount Lemmon	Mount Lemmon Survey	·	2.9 km	MPC · JPL
396092	2013 CB_{115}	—	June 8, 2005	Kitt Peak	Spacewatch	·	1.9 km	MPC · JPL
396093	2013 CJ_{115}	—	February 10, 2002	Socorro	LINEAR	·	3.3 km	MPC · JPL
396094	2013 CR_{115}	—	October 30, 2007	Kitt Peak	Spacewatch	·	1.9 km	MPC · JPL
396095	2013 CY_{117}	—	December 14, 2006	Kitt Peak	Spacewatch	·	5.2 km	MPC · JPL
396096	2013 CZ_{120}	—	January 30, 2003	Kitt Peak	Spacewatch	·	3.9 km	MPC · JPL
396097	2013 CZ_{122}	—	February 7, 2002	Socorro	LINEAR	·	3.5 km	MPC · JPL
396098	2013 CF_{123}	—	October 30, 2005	Kitt Peak	Spacewatch	·	3.2 km	MPC · JPL
396099	2013 CA_{130}	—	February 18, 2008	Mount Lemmon	Mount Lemmon Survey	·	3.4 km	MPC · JPL
396100	2013 CQ_{137}	—	February 26, 2007	Mount Lemmon	Mount Lemmon Survey	·	5.5 km	MPC · JPL

== 396101–396200 ==
back to top

Designation			Discovery			Properties		Ref
Permanent	Provisional	Named after	Date	Site	Discoverer(s)	Category	Diam.	Ref
396101	2013 CD_{139}	—	February 7, 2008	Mount Lemmon	Mount Lemmon Survey	·	2.4 km	MPC · JPL
396102	2013 CJ_{139}	—	December 19, 2003	Kitt Peak	Spacewatch	·	2.1 km	MPC · JPL
396103	2013 CE_{141}	—	April 2, 2006	Kitt Peak	Spacewatch	3:2 · SHU	5.4 km	MPC · JPL
396104	2013 CJ_{143}	—	December 19, 2003	Kitt Peak	Spacewatch	·	1.8 km	MPC · JPL
396105	2013 CH_{146}	—	February 1, 2008	Mount Lemmon	Mount Lemmon Survey	·	2.9 km	MPC · JPL
396106	2013 CF_{147}	—	December 1, 2005	Kitt Peak	Spacewatch	CYB	3.6 km	MPC · JPL
396107	2013 CT_{147}	—	August 30, 2005	Kitt Peak	Spacewatch	·	2.6 km	MPC · JPL
396108	2013 CM_{149}	—	September 13, 2007	Mount Lemmon	Mount Lemmon Survey	L4	9.3 km	MPC · JPL
396109	2013 CK_{150}	—	August 26, 1998	Kitt Peak	Spacewatch	CYB	3.0 km	MPC · JPL
396110	2013 CV_{158}	—	March 1, 2008	Kitt Peak	Spacewatch	·	3.0 km	MPC · JPL
396111	2013 CN_{159}	—	January 24, 2007	Kitt Peak	Spacewatch	·	3.0 km	MPC · JPL
396112	2013 CN_{160}	—	February 10, 2007	Mount Lemmon	Mount Lemmon Survey	VER	2.5 km	MPC · JPL
396113	2013 CZ_{161}	—	February 8, 2007	Kitt Peak	Spacewatch	·	4.2 km	MPC · JPL
396114	2013 CD_{164}	—	March 15, 2008	Kitt Peak	Spacewatch	EOS	1.8 km	MPC · JPL
396115	2013 CG_{170}	—	September 25, 2005	Catalina	CSS	·	3.4 km	MPC · JPL
396116	2013 CZ_{174}	—	April 3, 2008	Kitt Peak	Spacewatch	(31811)	2.8 km	MPC · JPL
396117	2013 CH_{177}	—	October 4, 2006	Mount Lemmon	Mount Lemmon Survey	(16286)	1.8 km	MPC · JPL
396118	2013 CM_{177}	—	February 12, 2008	Kitt Peak	Spacewatch	·	1.8 km	MPC · JPL
396119	2013 CH_{178}	—	September 4, 1999	Kitt Peak	Spacewatch	URS	3.4 km	MPC · JPL
396120	2013 CU_{178}	—	December 13, 2006	Mount Lemmon	Mount Lemmon Survey	·	3.4 km	MPC · JPL
396121	2013 CV_{181}	—	January 26, 2007	Kitt Peak	Spacewatch	VER	3.6 km	MPC · JPL
396122	2013 CL_{183}	—	May 8, 2005	Kitt Peak	Spacewatch	WIT	1.1 km	MPC · JPL
396123	2013 CJ_{188}	—	February 7, 2002	Socorro	LINEAR	·	4.1 km	MPC · JPL
396124	2013 CT_{189}	—	August 19, 2006	Kitt Peak	Spacewatch	·	2.2 km	MPC · JPL
396125	2013 CF_{190}	—	October 22, 2006	Mount Lemmon	Mount Lemmon Survey	(1298)	2.6 km	MPC · JPL
396126	2013 CJ_{191}	—	March 11, 2005	Anderson Mesa	LONEOS	·	2.1 km	MPC · JPL
396127	2013 CD_{192}	—	April 7, 2005	Catalina	CSS	·	2.9 km	MPC · JPL
396128	2013 CS_{198}	—	March 3, 1997	Kitt Peak	Spacewatch	3:2	5.7 km	MPC · JPL
396129	2013 CX_{201}	—	January 17, 2007	Kitt Peak	Spacewatch	·	2.8 km	MPC · JPL
396130	2013 CS_{203}	—	December 23, 2006	Mount Lemmon	Mount Lemmon Survey	·	3.0 km	MPC · JPL
396131	2013 CT_{203}	—	February 17, 2004	Kitt Peak	Spacewatch	NEM	2.3 km	MPC · JPL
396132	2013 CH_{211}	—	September 20, 2011	Kitt Peak	Spacewatch	·	1.8 km	MPC · JPL
396133	2013 CE_{214}	—	September 15, 2007	Mount Lemmon	Mount Lemmon Survey	L4	8.0 km	MPC · JPL
396134	2013 CW_{214}	—	October 9, 2008	Mount Lemmon	Mount Lemmon Survey	L4	7.4 km	MPC · JPL
396135	2013 CJ_{216}	—	October 2, 2006	Mount Lemmon	Mount Lemmon Survey	HOF	2.3 km	MPC · JPL
396136	2013 CJ_{222}	—	April 25, 2006	Mount Lemmon	Mount Lemmon Survey	3:2 · SHU	5.2 km	MPC · JPL
396137	2013 DD_{2}	—	April 21, 2009	Mount Lemmon	Mount Lemmon Survey	·	3.4 km	MPC · JPL
396138	2013 DZ_{3}	—	November 1, 2006	Kitt Peak	Spacewatch	·	1.8 km	MPC · JPL
396139	2013 DC_{5}	—	November 20, 2006	Mount Lemmon	Mount Lemmon Survey	·	2.1 km	MPC · JPL
396140	2013 DU_{5}	—	January 20, 2012	Mount Lemmon	Mount Lemmon Survey	L4	7.2 km	MPC · JPL
396141	2013 DW_{7}	—	November 25, 2006	Mount Lemmon	Mount Lemmon Survey	·	4.8 km	MPC · JPL
396142	2013 DH_{8}	—	March 11, 2008	Mount Lemmon	Mount Lemmon Survey	·	3.5 km	MPC · JPL
396143	2013 DA_{9}	—	January 26, 2000	Kitt Peak	Spacewatch	CYB	4.7 km	MPC · JPL
396144	2013 DJ_{9}	—	March 16, 2004	Campo Imperatore	CINEOS	·	2.4 km	MPC · JPL
396145	2013 DV_{9}	—	April 15, 2008	Mount Lemmon	Mount Lemmon Survey	·	3.0 km	MPC · JPL
396146	2013 DN_{10}	—	October 19, 1995	Kitt Peak	Spacewatch	(5)	1.2 km	MPC · JPL
396147	2013 DS_{10}	—	May 16, 2005	Mount Lemmon	Mount Lemmon Survey	·	2.1 km	MPC · JPL
396148	2013 DU_{10}	—	October 26, 2005	Kitt Peak	Spacewatch	·	2.8 km	MPC · JPL
396149	2013 EE	—	February 18, 2004	Kitt Peak	Spacewatch	·	2.2 km	MPC · JPL
396150	2013 EX_{2}	—	December 6, 2007	Kitt Peak	Spacewatch	·	2.5 km	MPC · JPL
396151	2013 EK_{5}	—	September 19, 2001	Socorro	LINEAR	·	2.3 km	MPC · JPL
396152	2013 EL_{5}	—	October 17, 2006	Mount Lemmon	Mount Lemmon Survey	·	1.8 km	MPC · JPL
396153	2013 EO_{12}	—	April 4, 2008	Mount Lemmon	Mount Lemmon Survey	EMA	3.1 km	MPC · JPL
396154	2013 EN_{13}	—	December 12, 2006	Kitt Peak	Spacewatch	·	2.0 km	MPC · JPL
396155	2013 EY_{14}	—	October 16, 2009	Mount Lemmon	Mount Lemmon Survey	3:2	5.4 km	MPC · JPL
396156	2013 EG_{25}	—	March 13, 2002	Socorro	LINEAR	(5651)	3.3 km	MPC · JPL
396157	2013 EQ_{32}	—	August 18, 2006	Kitt Peak	Spacewatch	·	1.7 km	MPC · JPL
396158	2013 EE_{35}	—	September 24, 2008	Kitt Peak	Spacewatch	L4	7.3 km	MPC · JPL
396159	2013 EA_{41}	—	September 21, 2009	Mount Lemmon	Mount Lemmon Survey	L4 · (8060)	7.3 km	MPC · JPL
396160	2013 ER_{42}	—	August 31, 2005	Kitt Peak	Spacewatch	·	2.7 km	MPC · JPL
396161	2013 EY_{43}	—	March 15, 2004	Kitt Peak	Spacewatch	·	2.3 km	MPC · JPL
396162	2013 EF_{48}	—	March 11, 2008	Kitt Peak	Spacewatch	·	3.8 km	MPC · JPL
396163	2013 EJ_{48}	—	September 14, 1999	Kitt Peak	Spacewatch	·	3.1 km	MPC · JPL
396164	2013 ES_{57}	—	February 13, 2002	Kitt Peak	Spacewatch	·	2.5 km	MPC · JPL
396165	2013 EL_{70}	—	February 28, 2009	Kitt Peak	Spacewatch	·	1.4 km	MPC · JPL
396166	2013 EK_{80}	—	November 25, 2005	Catalina	CSS	·	3.9 km	MPC · JPL
396167	2013 EB_{92}	—	October 31, 2005	Mount Lemmon	Mount Lemmon Survey	·	3.9 km	MPC · JPL
396168	2013 ER_{92}	—	November 18, 2007	Socorro	LINEAR	EUN	1.5 km	MPC · JPL
396169	2013 EN_{102}	—	September 13, 2005	Kitt Peak	Spacewatch	·	3.3 km	MPC · JPL
396170	2013 EJ_{112}	—	November 6, 2010	Mount Lemmon	Mount Lemmon Survey	CYB	5.4 km	MPC · JPL
396171	2013 ED_{119}	—	August 30, 2005	Kitt Peak	Spacewatch	·	2.4 km	MPC · JPL
396172	2013 EC_{126}	—	February 20, 2009	Kitt Peak	Spacewatch	·	1.9 km	MPC · JPL
396173	2013 FL_{25}	—	April 16, 2008	Mount Lemmon	Mount Lemmon Survey	·	3.8 km	MPC · JPL
396174	2013 GE_{1}	—	March 31, 2004	Kitt Peak	Spacewatch	·	2.0 km	MPC · JPL
396175	2013 GL_{14}	—	December 31, 2011	Mount Lemmon	Mount Lemmon Survey	URS	3.7 km	MPC · JPL
396176	2013 GV_{20}	—	April 20, 2009	Kitt Peak	Spacewatch	·	3.0 km	MPC · JPL
396177	2013 GY_{23}	—	May 12, 2005	Kitt Peak	Spacewatch	·	1.5 km	MPC · JPL
396178	2013 GY_{24}	—	January 26, 2007	Anderson Mesa	LONEOS	·	4.0 km	MPC · JPL
396179	2013 GR_{30}	—	September 22, 2003	Kitt Peak	Spacewatch	·	3.4 km	MPC · JPL
396180	2013 GC_{38}	—	September 13, 2004	Kitt Peak	Spacewatch	·	2.6 km	MPC · JPL
396181	2013 GY_{61}	—	October 7, 2004	Kitt Peak	Spacewatch	·	2.9 km	MPC · JPL
396182	2013 GW_{80}	—	May 1, 1997	Kitt Peak	Spacewatch	3:2	7.0 km	MPC · JPL
396183	2013 GU_{88}	—	September 18, 1998	Kitt Peak	Spacewatch	·	4.4 km	MPC · JPL
396184	2013 GQ_{89}	—	June 1, 1997	Kitt Peak	Spacewatch	·	1.9 km	MPC · JPL
396185	2013 GX_{90}	—	April 29, 2003	Kitt Peak	Spacewatch	·	3.4 km	MPC · JPL
396186	2013 GQ_{92}	—	November 17, 2006	Mount Lemmon	Mount Lemmon Survey	·	4.3 km	MPC · JPL
396187	2013 GL_{99}	—	June 4, 1995	Kitt Peak	Spacewatch	·	2.6 km	MPC · JPL
396188	2013 GD_{135}	—	March 16, 2007	Kitt Peak	Spacewatch	·	3.8 km	MPC · JPL
396189	2013 HY_{13}	—	May 14, 2008	Kitt Peak	Spacewatch	EOS	2.2 km	MPC · JPL
396190	2013 HO_{42}	—	December 1, 2005	Kitt Peak	Spacewatch	EOS	1.9 km	MPC · JPL
396191	2013 HX_{49}	—	October 31, 2010	Mount Lemmon	Mount Lemmon Survey	EOS	2.5 km	MPC · JPL
396192	2013 JN_{25}	—	July 11, 2005	Mount Lemmon	Mount Lemmon Survey	·	2.6 km	MPC · JPL
396193	2013 JA_{26}	—	May 8, 2008	Mount Lemmon	Mount Lemmon Survey	EOS	2.6 km	MPC · JPL
396194	2013 JX_{44}	—	October 11, 2004	Kitt Peak	Spacewatch	·	3.8 km	MPC · JPL
396195	2013 JW_{57}	—	October 1, 2005	Kitt Peak	Spacewatch	·	2.3 km	MPC · JPL
396196	2013 PV_{9}	—	March 8, 2006	Kitt Peak	Spacewatch	·	2.3 km	MPC · JPL
396197	2013 PU_{40}	—	September 26, 2005	Kitt Peak	Spacewatch	·	1.2 km	MPC · JPL
396198	2013 PK_{52}	—	June 22, 1995	Kitt Peak	Spacewatch	ERI	940 m	MPC · JPL
396199	2013 PA_{59}	—	March 3, 2006	Mount Lemmon	Mount Lemmon Survey	EOS	2.3 km	MPC · JPL
396200	2013 PC_{70}	—	March 7, 2008	Kitt Peak	Spacewatch	·	1.9 km	MPC · JPL

== 396201–396300 ==
back to top

Designation			Discovery			Properties		Ref
Permanent	Provisional	Named after	Date	Site	Discoverer(s)	Category	Diam.	Ref
396201	2013 QT_{18}	—	February 6, 2007	Mount Lemmon	Mount Lemmon Survey	·	1.2 km	MPC · JPL
396202	2013 RD_{22}	—	November 2, 2008	Catalina	CSS	TIR	3.4 km	MPC · JPL
396203	2013 RK_{29}	—	February 28, 2008	Mount Lemmon	Mount Lemmon Survey	NYS	1.4 km	MPC · JPL
396204	2013 RC_{90}	—	September 21, 2009	Kitt Peak	Spacewatch	EUN	1.5 km	MPC · JPL
396205	2013 RX_{93}	—	August 21, 2006	Kitt Peak	Spacewatch	·	670 m	MPC · JPL
396206	2013 SK_{21}	—	October 9, 2004	Kitt Peak	Spacewatch	AGN	1.4 km	MPC · JPL
396207	2013 TL_{93}	—	April 18, 1999	Kitt Peak	Spacewatch	·	3.6 km	MPC · JPL
396208	2013 WP_{16}	—	October 29, 2005	Mount Lemmon	Mount Lemmon Survey	·	1.5 km	MPC · JPL
396209	2013 XK_{24}	—	March 23, 2006	Catalina	CSS	·	3.0 km	MPC · JPL
396210	2013 YQ_{10}	—	October 12, 2005	Kitt Peak	Spacewatch	NYS	1.1 km	MPC · JPL
396211	2013 YV_{18}	—	October 28, 2005	Mount Lemmon	Mount Lemmon Survey	·	1.3 km	MPC · JPL
396212	2013 YH_{42}	—	February 16, 2010	Catalina	CSS	ADE	3.1 km	MPC · JPL
396213	2013 YJ_{45}	—	December 7, 1999	Kitt Peak	Spacewatch	·	810 m	MPC · JPL
396214	2013 YK_{47}	—	September 22, 2008	Kitt Peak	Spacewatch	HOF	3.4 km	MPC · JPL
396215	2013 YR_{58}	—	June 21, 2007	Mount Lemmon	Mount Lemmon Survey	·	1.3 km	MPC · JPL
396216	2013 YK_{124}	—	December 4, 2007	Catalina	CSS	EOS	2.4 km	MPC · JPL
396217	2013 YX_{125}	—	January 23, 2006	Kitt Peak	Spacewatch	·	1.4 km	MPC · JPL
396218	2013 YZ_{125}	—	November 9, 2007	Catalina	CSS	·	3.6 km	MPC · JPL
396219	2013 YA_{140}	—	November 18, 2007	Mount Lemmon	Mount Lemmon Survey	·	3.7 km	MPC · JPL
396220	2014 AH	—	April 5, 2010	WISE	WISE	·	3.7 km	MPC · JPL
396221	2014 AB_{12}	—	March 14, 2005	Mount Lemmon	Mount Lemmon Survey	·	1.8 km	MPC · JPL
396222	2014 AB_{15}	—	September 3, 2008	Kitt Peak	Spacewatch	KON	2.8 km	MPC · JPL
396223	2014 AJ_{27}	—	May 24, 2006	Kitt Peak	Spacewatch	·	1.6 km	MPC · JPL
396224	2014 AH_{43}	—	January 1, 2009	Kitt Peak	Spacewatch	·	2.9 km	MPC · JPL
396225	2014 AP_{49}	—	November 30, 2005	Kitt Peak	Spacewatch	·	1.2 km	MPC · JPL
396226	2014 AL_{53}	—	December 1, 2008	Mount Lemmon	Mount Lemmon Survey	·	5.3 km	MPC · JPL
396227	2014 BA_{1}	—	April 16, 2005	Kitt Peak	Spacewatch	·	2.2 km	MPC · JPL
396228	2014 BO_{2}	—	September 17, 2003	Kitt Peak	Spacewatch	·	1.7 km	MPC · JPL
396229	2014 BP_{5}	—	December 22, 2008	Kitt Peak	Spacewatch	·	2.9 km	MPC · JPL
396230	2014 BN_{12}	—	January 13, 2008	Kitt Peak	Spacewatch	·	3.6 km	MPC · JPL
396231	2014 BJ_{14}	—	December 7, 2005	Kitt Peak	Spacewatch	·	1.1 km	MPC · JPL
396232	2014 BZ_{23}	—	December 15, 2004	Kitt Peak	Spacewatch	JUN	1.0 km	MPC · JPL
396233	2014 BE_{24}	—	August 27, 2006	Anderson Mesa	LONEOS	EOS	2.1 km	MPC · JPL
396234	2014 BM_{29}	—	March 12, 2007	Catalina	CSS	·	1.5 km	MPC · JPL
396235	2014 BO_{29}	—	November 1, 2008	Mount Lemmon	Mount Lemmon Survey	·	3.8 km	MPC · JPL
396236	2014 BS_{29}	—	March 11, 1996	Kitt Peak	Spacewatch	MAS	810 m	MPC · JPL
396237	2014 BF_{30}	—	March 2, 2009	Kitt Peak	Spacewatch	·	3.1 km	MPC · JPL
396238	2014 BJ_{35}	—	October 30, 2005	Kitt Peak	Spacewatch	·	860 m	MPC · JPL
396239	2014 BL_{35}	—	February 2, 2005	Kitt Peak	Spacewatch	·	2.1 km	MPC · JPL
396240	2014 BE_{37}	—	January 19, 2001	Socorro	LINEAR	·	2.0 km	MPC · JPL
396241	2014 BJ_{37}	—	March 24, 1998	Kitt Peak	Spacewatch	EOS	2.4 km	MPC · JPL
396242	2014 BR_{37}	—	March 24, 2003	Kitt Peak	Spacewatch	·	1.1 km	MPC · JPL
396243	2014 BL_{38}	—	March 24, 2003	Kitt Peak	Spacewatch	·	1.4 km	MPC · JPL
396244	2014 BU_{42}	—	June 30, 2005	Kitt Peak	Spacewatch	·	3.6 km	MPC · JPL
396245	2014 BV_{44}	—	April 13, 2004	Kitt Peak	Spacewatch	·	2.3 km	MPC · JPL
396246	2014 BH_{45}	—	June 12, 2004	Kitt Peak	Spacewatch	·	3.8 km	MPC · JPL
396247	2014 BJ_{47}	—	September 26, 2006	Mount Lemmon	Mount Lemmon Survey	·	2.4 km	MPC · JPL
396248	2014 BN_{47}	—	November 25, 2005	Kitt Peak	Spacewatch	·	1.4 km	MPC · JPL
396249	2014 BU_{48}	—	March 17, 2009	Kitt Peak	Spacewatch	·	2.8 km	MPC · JPL
396250	2014 BF_{56}	—	October 2, 2008	Mount Lemmon	Mount Lemmon Survey	·	1.5 km	MPC · JPL
396251	2014 BV_{60}	—	January 15, 2005	Catalina	CSS	EUN	1.5 km	MPC · JPL
396252	2014 BH_{63}	—	September 9, 2008	Mount Lemmon	Mount Lemmon Survey	·	1.8 km	MPC · JPL
396253	2014 BO_{63}	—	April 2, 2009	Mount Lemmon	Mount Lemmon Survey	·	3.2 km	MPC · JPL
396254	2014 CP_{2}	—	March 28, 2009	Siding Spring	SSS	·	4.3 km	MPC · JPL
396255	2014 CX_{2}	—	February 25, 2006	Kitt Peak	Spacewatch	·	2.5 km	MPC · JPL
396256	2014 CD_{4}	—	September 12, 2007	Mount Lemmon	Mount Lemmon Survey	·	2.1 km	MPC · JPL
396257	2014 CB_{5}	—	February 22, 2009	Kitt Peak	Spacewatch	EOS	2.2 km	MPC · JPL
396258	2014 CO_{7}	—	April 7, 2006	Siding Spring	SSS	·	2.0 km	MPC · JPL
396259	2014 CN_{11}	—	May 16, 1999	Kitt Peak	Spacewatch	·	3.1 km	MPC · JPL
396260	2014 CK_{12}	—	March 14, 2004	Kitt Peak	Spacewatch	·	740 m	MPC · JPL
396261	2014 CK_{13}	—	March 29, 2009	Catalina	CSS	H	760 m	MPC · JPL
396262	2014 CY_{14}	—	October 3, 2002	Campo Imperatore	CINEOS	·	2.4 km	MPC · JPL
396263	2014 CG_{15}	—	January 26, 2003	Kitt Peak	Spacewatch	EOS	2.7 km	MPC · JPL
396264	2014 CO_{15}	—	October 17, 2006	Kitt Peak	Spacewatch	EOS	2.3 km	MPC · JPL
396265	2014 CQ_{15}	—	August 21, 2006	Kitt Peak	Spacewatch	·	2.8 km	MPC · JPL
396266	2014 CF_{16}	—	October 1, 2006	Kitt Peak	Spacewatch	·	3.2 km	MPC · JPL
396267	2014 CQ_{16}	—	March 27, 2004	Catalina	CSS	·	820 m	MPC · JPL
396268	2014 CT_{16}	—	August 21, 2006	Kitt Peak	Spacewatch	EOS	2.3 km	MPC · JPL
396269	2014 CP_{17}	—	March 8, 2003	Anderson Mesa	LONEOS	·	4.0 km	MPC · JPL
396270	2014 CJ_{18}	—	September 30, 2006	Kitt Peak	Spacewatch	EMA	3.9 km	MPC · JPL
396271	2014 CL_{18}	—	March 15, 2004	Kitt Peak	Spacewatch	·	760 m	MPC · JPL
396272	2014 CY_{18}	—	August 31, 2005	Kitt Peak	Spacewatch	·	3.5 km	MPC · JPL
396273	2014 CV_{19}	—	October 29, 2005	Mount Lemmon	Mount Lemmon Survey	·	1.2 km	MPC · JPL
396274	2014 CS_{20}	—	October 29, 2008	Mount Lemmon	Mount Lemmon Survey	·	3.0 km	MPC · JPL
396275	2014 CD_{21}	—	March 8, 2003	Kitt Peak	Spacewatch	·	1.7 km	MPC · JPL
396276	2014 CO_{21}	—	September 25, 2008	Kitt Peak	Spacewatch	(5)	2.3 km	MPC · JPL
396277	2014 CF_{22}	—	April 9, 2002	Socorro	LINEAR	·	1.7 km	MPC · JPL
396278	2014 CJ_{22}	—	November 17, 2009	Kitt Peak	Spacewatch	·	1.2 km	MPC · JPL
396279	2014 CD_{23}	—	September 26, 2003	Apache Point	SDSS	·	2.1 km	MPC · JPL
396280	2014 DK_{1}	—	March 21, 1998	Kitt Peak	Spacewatch	·	4.8 km	MPC · JPL
396281	2014 DT_{1}	—	September 13, 2007	Kitt Peak	Spacewatch	ADE	3.1 km	MPC · JPL
396282	2014 DE_{2}	—	March 17, 2005	Mount Lemmon	Mount Lemmon Survey	(13314)	1.7 km	MPC · JPL
396283	2014 DP_{4}	—	October 24, 2005	Kitt Peak	Spacewatch	·	890 m	MPC · JPL
396284	2014 DD_{5}	—	October 8, 2008	Kitt Peak	Spacewatch	·	1.6 km	MPC · JPL
396285	2014 DC_{7}	—	February 13, 2010	Catalina	CSS	·	1.7 km	MPC · JPL
396286	2014 DX_{7}	—	February 29, 2000	Socorro	LINEAR	·	2.4 km	MPC · JPL
396287	2014 DL_{14}	—	April 9, 2010	Kitt Peak	Spacewatch	·	1.5 km	MPC · JPL
396288	2014 DM_{18}	—	March 25, 2000	Kitt Peak	Spacewatch	·	2.0 km	MPC · JPL
396289	2014 DR_{18}	—	February 10, 2003	Kitt Peak	Spacewatch	·	3.4 km	MPC · JPL
396290	2014 DA_{19}	—	March 5, 2006	Kitt Peak	Spacewatch	(5)	1.4 km	MPC · JPL
396291	2014 DH_{19}	—	January 28, 2007	Mount Lemmon	Mount Lemmon Survey	·	1.3 km	MPC · JPL
396292	2014 DR_{19}	—	October 22, 2006	Kitt Peak	Spacewatch	·	2.5 km	MPC · JPL
396293	2014 DD_{20}	—	January 11, 2008	Catalina	CSS	EOS	2.3 km	MPC · JPL
396294	2014 DK_{20}	—	February 14, 2002	Kitt Peak	Spacewatch	L4	8.3 km	MPC · JPL
396295	2014 DP_{20}	—	October 26, 2005	Kitt Peak	Spacewatch	·	860 m	MPC · JPL
396296	2014 DY_{20}	—	November 19, 2007	Mount Lemmon	Mount Lemmon Survey	·	1.7 km	MPC · JPL
396297	2014 DZ_{20}	—	February 16, 2010	Mount Lemmon	Mount Lemmon Survey	·	1.8 km	MPC · JPL
396298	2014 DB_{21}	—	April 27, 2001	Kitt Peak	Spacewatch	·	680 m	MPC · JPL
396299	2014 DK_{21}	—	March 8, 2005	Mount Lemmon	Mount Lemmon Survey	·	2.0 km	MPC · JPL
396300	2014 DT_{23}	—	September 16, 2003	Kitt Peak	Spacewatch	·	1.4 km	MPC · JPL

== 396301–396400 ==
back to top

Designation			Discovery			Properties		Ref
Permanent	Provisional	Named after	Date	Site	Discoverer(s)	Category	Diam.	Ref
396301	2014 DZ_{23}	—	October 21, 1995	Kitt Peak	Spacewatch	·	3.3 km	MPC · JPL
396302	2014 DA_{24}	—	November 4, 2007	Mount Lemmon	Mount Lemmon Survey	EOS	2.3 km	MPC · JPL
396303	2014 DV_{25}	—	November 4, 2005	Kitt Peak	Spacewatch	·	2.0 km	MPC · JPL
396304	2014 DZ_{25}	—	December 10, 1998	Kitt Peak	Spacewatch	·	2.7 km	MPC · JPL
396305	2014 DQ_{27}	—	March 9, 2005	Mount Lemmon	Mount Lemmon Survey	·	2.2 km	MPC · JPL
396306	2014 DS_{27}	—	December 27, 2006	Mount Lemmon	Mount Lemmon Survey	·	640 m	MPC · JPL
396307	2014 DU_{28}	—	December 14, 2004	Catalina	CSS	·	1.4 km	MPC · JPL
396308	2014 DM_{30}	—	December 28, 2005	Kitt Peak	Spacewatch	·	1.3 km	MPC · JPL
396309	2014 DH_{31}	—	March 19, 1996	Kitt Peak	Spacewatch	·	2.2 km	MPC · JPL
396310	2014 DX_{31}	—	September 19, 2001	Kitt Peak	Spacewatch	V	690 m	MPC · JPL
396311	2014 DZ_{33}	—	April 7, 2010	WISE	WISE	·	3.2 km	MPC · JPL
396312	2014 DD_{34}	—	January 19, 2008	Kitt Peak	Spacewatch	THM	2.6 km	MPC · JPL
396313	2014 DG_{34}	—	January 11, 2008	Catalina	CSS	URS	3.5 km	MPC · JPL
396314	2014 DH_{34}	—	December 19, 2004	Mount Lemmon	Mount Lemmon Survey	·	1.5 km	MPC · JPL
396315	2014 DX_{34}	—	February 27, 2006	Kitt Peak	Spacewatch	·	1.4 km	MPC · JPL
396316	2014 DZ_{34}	—	May 6, 2006	Mount Lemmon	Mount Lemmon Survey	·	1.2 km	MPC · JPL
396317	2014 DR_{35}	—	April 24, 2003	Kitt Peak	Spacewatch	HYG	2.9 km	MPC · JPL
396318	2014 DT_{35}	—	October 25, 2005	Mount Lemmon	Mount Lemmon Survey	·	900 m	MPC · JPL
396319	2014 DK_{38}	—	October 7, 2005	Kitt Peak	Spacewatch	·	790 m	MPC · JPL
396320	2014 DO_{38}	—	April 30, 2006	Kitt Peak	Spacewatch	·	1.5 km	MPC · JPL
396321	2014 DK_{43}	—	March 13, 1997	Kitt Peak	Spacewatch	·	1.7 km	MPC · JPL
396322	2014 DU_{45}	—	January 19, 2008	Mount Lemmon	Mount Lemmon Survey	·	3.0 km	MPC · JPL
396323	2014 DX_{45}	—	August 23, 2007	Kitt Peak	Spacewatch	·	1.7 km	MPC · JPL
396324	2014 DO_{46}	—	May 19, 2004	Kitt Peak	Spacewatch	·	3.1 km	MPC · JPL
396325	2014 DB_{47}	—	April 3, 2000	Kitt Peak	Spacewatch	·	820 m	MPC · JPL
396326	2014 DE_{47}	—	August 30, 2005	Kitt Peak	Spacewatch	·	4.8 km	MPC · JPL
396327	2014 DD_{48}	—	September 15, 2004	Kitt Peak	Spacewatch	·	1.4 km	MPC · JPL
396328	2014 DF_{48}	—	September 10, 2004	Kitt Peak	Spacewatch	MAS	760 m	MPC · JPL
396329	2014 DT_{48}	—	February 14, 2010	Kitt Peak	Spacewatch	·	1.3 km	MPC · JPL
396330	2014 DY_{48}	—	September 14, 2005	Kitt Peak	Spacewatch	·	960 m	MPC · JPL
396331	2014 DF_{49}	—	May 19, 2004	Kitt Peak	Spacewatch	·	3.5 km	MPC · JPL
396332	2014 DA_{55}	—	September 29, 2003	Kitt Peak	Spacewatch	·	1.6 km	MPC · JPL
396333	2014 DL_{55}	—	August 28, 2005	Kitt Peak	Spacewatch	·	2.8 km	MPC · JPL
396334	2014 DJ_{57}	—	March 29, 2004	Kitt Peak	Spacewatch	·	660 m	MPC · JPL
396335	2014 DW_{60}	—	March 30, 2010	WISE	WISE	·	3.4 km	MPC · JPL
396336	2014 DF_{62}	—	March 15, 2005	Kitt Peak	Spacewatch	·	2.2 km	MPC · JPL
396337	2014 DA_{64}	—	November 1, 2008	Mount Lemmon	Mount Lemmon Survey	NYS	1.1 km	MPC · JPL
396338	2014 DU_{64}	—	November 25, 2009	Kitt Peak	Spacewatch	·	680 m	MPC · JPL
396339	2014 DE_{65}	—	November 8, 2007	Mount Lemmon	Mount Lemmon Survey	·	1.5 km	MPC · JPL
396340	2014 DB_{66}	—	October 21, 2006	Mount Lemmon	Mount Lemmon Survey	·	2.4 km	MPC · JPL
396341	2014 DX_{67}	—	May 13, 2010	Mount Lemmon	Mount Lemmon Survey	·	2.0 km	MPC · JPL
396342	2014 DY_{67}	—	March 28, 2009	Kitt Peak	Spacewatch	·	1.9 km	MPC · JPL
396343	2014 DH_{69}	—	August 29, 2005	Kitt Peak	Spacewatch	·	950 m	MPC · JPL
396344	2014 DQ_{69}	—	December 18, 2007	Mount Lemmon	Mount Lemmon Survey	·	3.0 km	MPC · JPL
396345	2014 DX_{70}	—	July 30, 2008	Kitt Peak	Spacewatch	·	1.3 km	MPC · JPL
396346	2014 DD_{71}	—	January 11, 2008	Catalina	CSS	LIX	3.3 km	MPC · JPL
396347	2014 DH_{72}	—	April 12, 2005	Mount Lemmon	Mount Lemmon Survey	·	2.2 km	MPC · JPL
396348	2014 DA_{79}	—	November 21, 2007	Mount Lemmon	Mount Lemmon Survey	·	2.2 km	MPC · JPL
396349	2014 DB_{79}	—	November 19, 2008	Kitt Peak	Spacewatch	·	1.5 km	MPC · JPL
396350	2014 DG_{79}	—	September 23, 2008	Kitt Peak	Spacewatch	L4	8.5 km	MPC · JPL
396351	2014 DK_{79}	—	March 31, 2003	Kitt Peak	Spacewatch	·	1.5 km	MPC · JPL
396352	2014 DV_{79}	—	February 8, 2002	Kitt Peak	Spacewatch	·	3.0 km	MPC · JPL
396353	2014 DN_{81}	—	March 9, 2002	Kitt Peak	Spacewatch	·	1.6 km	MPC · JPL
396354	2014 DJ_{82}	—	December 30, 2007	Kitt Peak	Spacewatch	·	2.3 km	MPC · JPL
396355	2014 DS_{82}	—	March 10, 2007	Kitt Peak	Spacewatch	·	1.1 km	MPC · JPL
396356	2014 DZ_{83}	—	November 16, 2001	Kitt Peak	Spacewatch	·	1.2 km	MPC · JPL
396357	2014 DJ_{84}	—	October 1, 2003	Kitt Peak	Spacewatch	MAR	1.2 km	MPC · JPL
396358	2014 DZ_{84}	—	April 14, 2004	Kitt Peak	Spacewatch	·	2.1 km	MPC · JPL
396359	2014 DC_{87}	—	March 24, 2003	Kitt Peak	Spacewatch	·	3.6 km	MPC · JPL
396360	2014 DL_{88}	—	February 10, 1999	Kitt Peak	Spacewatch	KOR	1.8 km	MPC · JPL
396361	2014 DD_{89}	—	March 18, 2005	Catalina	CSS	·	2.3 km	MPC · JPL
396362	2014 DF_{89}	—	August 22, 2003	Campo Imperatore	CINEOS	·	2.3 km	MPC · JPL
396363	2014 DL_{89}	—	February 25, 2007	Mount Lemmon	Mount Lemmon Survey	·	1.6 km	MPC · JPL
396364	2014 DN_{89}	—	September 4, 1999	Kitt Peak	Spacewatch	·	2.8 km	MPC · JPL
396365	2014 DL_{90}	—	July 30, 2008	Kitt Peak	Spacewatch	V	650 m	MPC · JPL
396366	2014 DT_{90}	—	March 26, 2003	Palomar	NEAT	PHO	850 m	MPC · JPL
396367	2014 DF_{93}	—	December 18, 2009	Mount Lemmon	Mount Lemmon Survey	MAS	740 m	MPC · JPL
396368	2014 DL_{95}	—	May 6, 2010	Mount Lemmon	Mount Lemmon Survey	·	1.9 km	MPC · JPL
396369	2014 DP_{98}	—	March 11, 2007	Kitt Peak	Spacewatch	·	1.2 km	MPC · JPL
396370	2014 DQ_{104}	—	October 20, 2007	Catalina	CSS	·	2.2 km	MPC · JPL
396371	2014 DV_{105}	—	April 2, 2006	Kitt Peak	Spacewatch	·	1.6 km	MPC · JPL
396372	2014 DV_{106}	—	January 8, 2010	Kitt Peak	Spacewatch	V	720 m	MPC · JPL
396373	2014 DX_{106}	—	December 2, 2008	Kitt Peak	Spacewatch	·	2.2 km	MPC · JPL
396374	2014 DD_{109}	—	October 28, 1994	Kitt Peak	Spacewatch	·	3.3 km	MPC · JPL
396375	2014 DL_{109}	—	September 11, 2007	Mount Lemmon	Mount Lemmon Survey	·	1.2 km	MPC · JPL
396376	2014 DZ_{111}	—	December 18, 2001	Kitt Peak	Spacewatch	·	3.7 km	MPC · JPL
396377	2014 DW_{113}	—	August 21, 2006	Kitt Peak	Spacewatch	·	3.4 km	MPC · JPL
396378	2014 DX_{113}	—	August 19, 2006	Kitt Peak	Spacewatch	·	3.6 km	MPC · JPL
396379	2014 DA_{115}	—	March 7, 2003	Kitt Peak	Spacewatch	MAS	650 m	MPC · JPL
396380	2014 DC_{115}	—	November 21, 2009	Mount Lemmon	Mount Lemmon Survey	·	1.3 km	MPC · JPL
396381	2014 DS_{115}	—	August 21, 2001	Kitt Peak	Spacewatch	·	2.5 km	MPC · JPL
396382	2014 DP_{117}	—	October 8, 2007	Mount Lemmon	Mount Lemmon Survey	·	2.3 km	MPC · JPL
396383	2014 DT_{117}	—	March 10, 2003	Kitt Peak	Spacewatch	EOS	1.9 km	MPC · JPL
396384	2014 DK_{118}	—	November 21, 2007	Mount Lemmon	Mount Lemmon Survey	·	2.3 km	MPC · JPL
396385	2014 DS_{118}	—	September 22, 2008	Mount Lemmon	Mount Lemmon Survey	·	1.6 km	MPC · JPL
396386	2014 DG_{119}	—	December 27, 2005	Mount Lemmon	Mount Lemmon Survey	MAS	820 m	MPC · JPL
396387	2014 DK_{119}	—	January 7, 1999	Kitt Peak	Spacewatch	MAS	750 m	MPC · JPL
396388	2014 DX_{119}	—	January 31, 2009	Mount Lemmon	Mount Lemmon Survey	EOS	2.1 km	MPC · JPL
396389	2014 DZ_{120}	—	September 4, 2008	Kitt Peak	Spacewatch	·	2.1 km	MPC · JPL
396390	2014 DF_{121}	—	March 16, 2007	Kitt Peak	Spacewatch	V	610 m	MPC · JPL
396391	2014 DN_{121}	—	October 29, 1999	Kitt Peak	Spacewatch	·	1.7 km	MPC · JPL
396392	2014 DW_{121}	—	April 8, 2010	Kitt Peak	Spacewatch	·	1.4 km	MPC · JPL
396393	2014 DJ_{122}	—	March 11, 2008	Mount Lemmon	Mount Lemmon Survey	T_{j} (2.95)	5.9 km	MPC · JPL
396394	2014 DF_{126}	—	August 9, 2005	Cerro Tololo	Deep Ecliptic Survey	·	2.6 km	MPC · JPL
396395	2014 DZ_{130}	—	September 24, 2008	Mount Lemmon	Mount Lemmon Survey	L4	7.7 km	MPC · JPL
396396	2014 DC_{132}	—	May 2, 2003	Kitt Peak	Spacewatch	·	1.1 km	MPC · JPL
396397	2014 DH_{139}	—	March 21, 2009	Kitt Peak	Spacewatch	·	2.0 km	MPC · JPL
396398	2014 DJ_{139}	—	September 21, 1998	Kitt Peak	Spacewatch	GEF	1.4 km	MPC · JPL
396399	2014 DJ_{140}	—	March 20, 2001	Kitt Peak	Spacewatch	·	1.7 km	MPC · JPL
396400	2014 DP_{142}	—	October 24, 2008	Catalina	CSS	·	3.5 km	MPC · JPL

== 396401–396500 ==
back to top

Designation			Discovery			Properties		Ref
Permanent	Provisional	Named after	Date	Site	Discoverer(s)	Category	Diam.	Ref
396401	2014 ED_{1}	—	December 8, 2005	Kitt Peak	Spacewatch	·	1.2 km	MPC · JPL
396402	2014 EL_{1}	—	February 4, 2005	Mount Lemmon	Mount Lemmon Survey	·	1.5 km	MPC · JPL
396403	2014 EX_{1}	—	October 1, 2008	Mount Lemmon	Mount Lemmon Survey	·	1.3 km	MPC · JPL
396404	2014 EP_{4}	—	March 15, 2007	Mount Lemmon	Mount Lemmon Survey	·	1.3 km	MPC · JPL
396405	2014 EW_{4}	—	September 29, 2009	Mount Lemmon	Mount Lemmon Survey	L4	9.5 km	MPC · JPL
396406	2014 EY_{4}	—	January 28, 2003	Kitt Peak	Spacewatch	·	1.2 km	MPC · JPL
396407	2014 EJ_{7}	—	January 27, 2010	WISE	WISE	·	2.2 km	MPC · JPL
396408	2014 ER_{7}	—	March 12, 2005	Mount Lemmon	Mount Lemmon Survey	·	2.0 km	MPC · JPL
396409	2014 EG_{8}	—	August 10, 2007	Kitt Peak	Spacewatch	L4	9.9 km	MPC · JPL
396410	2014 EZ_{11}	—	November 30, 2003	Kitt Peak	Spacewatch	·	2.0 km	MPC · JPL
396411	2014 ER_{12}	—	March 13, 2010	Mount Lemmon	Mount Lemmon Survey	·	1.6 km	MPC · JPL
396412	2014 EC_{19}	—	October 1, 2009	Mount Lemmon	Mount Lemmon Survey	L4	9.0 km	MPC · JPL
396413	2014 ED_{23}	—	September 16, 2009	Kitt Peak	Spacewatch	L4	7.1 km	MPC · JPL
396414	2014 EQ_{23}	—	May 12, 1996	Kitt Peak	Spacewatch	·	970 m	MPC · JPL
396415	2014 ER_{23}	—	April 8, 2003	Kitt Peak	Spacewatch	·	3.1 km	MPC · JPL
396416	2014 ET_{23}	—	February 23, 2007	Kitt Peak	Spacewatch	·	810 m	MPC · JPL
396417	2014 EY_{23}	—	December 20, 2009	Kitt Peak	Spacewatch	·	960 m	MPC · JPL
396418	2014 EQ_{25}	—	September 16, 2003	Kitt Peak	Spacewatch	·	1.9 km	MPC · JPL
396419	2014 ES_{25}	—	October 9, 2008	Kitt Peak	Spacewatch	·	1.7 km	MPC · JPL
396420	2014 ES_{29}	—	October 29, 2008	Kitt Peak	Spacewatch	·	2.2 km	MPC · JPL
396421	2014 EH_{31}	—	October 9, 2007	Mount Lemmon	Mount Lemmon Survey	·	2.1 km	MPC · JPL
396422	2014 EL_{31}	—	September 18, 2006	Catalina	CSS	·	2.3 km	MPC · JPL
396423	2014 EK_{32}	—	May 11, 2004	Anderson Mesa	LONEOS	·	750 m	MPC · JPL
396424	2014 EN_{32}	—	March 21, 2004	Kitt Peak	Spacewatch	·	2.4 km	MPC · JPL
396425	2014 EL_{35}	—	December 14, 2001	Kitt Peak	Spacewatch	·	1.4 km	MPC · JPL
396426	2014 EL_{36}	—	February 10, 2010	Kitt Peak	Spacewatch	V	810 m	MPC · JPL
396427	2014 EU_{37}	—	March 10, 2003	Anderson Mesa	LONEOS	MAS	860 m	MPC · JPL
396428	2014 ED_{39}	—	March 24, 2003	Kitt Peak	Spacewatch	EOS	2.3 km	MPC · JPL
396429	2014 EP_{41}	—	January 16, 2004	Kitt Peak	Spacewatch	·	2.3 km	MPC · JPL
396430	2014 ET_{41}	—	November 30, 2008	Mount Lemmon	Mount Lemmon Survey	·	990 m	MPC · JPL
396431	2014 EV_{42}	—	February 19, 2001	Kitt Peak	Spacewatch	·	1.1 km	MPC · JPL
396432	2014 EG_{43}	—	July 29, 2008	Kitt Peak	Spacewatch	·	740 m	MPC · JPL
396433	2014 EB_{44}	—	October 24, 2005	Kitt Peak	Spacewatch	·	3.8 km	MPC · JPL
396434	2014 EL_{44}	—	October 4, 2006	Mount Lemmon	Mount Lemmon Survey	·	3.9 km	MPC · JPL
396435	2014 EV_{44}	—	March 10, 2005	Kitt Peak	Spacewatch	·	1.8 km	MPC · JPL
396436	2014 EO_{45}	—	May 8, 2003	Socorro	LINEAR	·	1.2 km	MPC · JPL
396437	2014 EK_{47}	—	October 25, 2008	Mount Lemmon	Mount Lemmon Survey	·	2.2 km	MPC · JPL
396438	2014 EW_{47}	—	March 26, 2003	Kitt Peak	Spacewatch	·	1.6 km	MPC · JPL
396439	2014 EU_{49}	—	March 2, 1997	Kitt Peak	Spacewatch	·	2.5 km	MPC · JPL
396440	2014 EY_{49}	—	November 18, 1995	Kitt Peak	Spacewatch	·	2.0 km	MPC · JPL
396441	2014 EC_{50}	—	October 12, 2007	Mount Lemmon	Mount Lemmon Survey	·	1.9 km	MPC · JPL
396442	2014 EX_{50}	—	June 13, 2005	Mount Lemmon	Mount Lemmon Survey	BRA	2.1 km	MPC · JPL
396443	2014 EN_{51}	—	August 22, 2004	Kitt Peak	Spacewatch	·	3.3 km	MPC · JPL
396444	2014 FL_{1}	—	February 24, 2006	Mount Lemmon	Mount Lemmon Survey	·	910 m	MPC · JPL
396445	2014 FM_{1}	—	September 19, 2006	Kitt Peak	Spacewatch	·	2.7 km	MPC · JPL
396446	2014 FT_{2}	—	March 23, 2003	Kitt Peak	Spacewatch	NYS	1.2 km	MPC · JPL
396447	2014 FA_{6}	—	September 23, 2008	Kitt Peak	Spacewatch	PHO	2.7 km	MPC · JPL
396448	2014 FE_{6}	—	March 12, 2005	Kitt Peak	Spacewatch	·	2.2 km	MPC · JPL
396449	2014 FO_{8}	—	October 1, 2000	Socorro	LINEAR	·	1.3 km	MPC · JPL
396450	2014 FT_{9}	—	December 1, 2008	Catalina	CSS	·	4.2 km	MPC · JPL
396451	2014 FB_{10}	—	November 4, 2007	Kitt Peak	Spacewatch	KOR	1.4 km	MPC · JPL
396452	2014 FL_{14}	—	March 18, 2009	Kitt Peak	Spacewatch	·	2.5 km	MPC · JPL
396453	2014 FU_{14}	—	April 12, 1996	Kitt Peak	Spacewatch	·	2.0 km	MPC · JPL
396454	2014 FE_{15}	—	March 15, 2007	Mount Lemmon	Mount Lemmon Survey	·	2.2 km	MPC · JPL
396455	2014 FY_{15}	—	February 1, 2003	Kitt Peak	Spacewatch	MAS	760 m	MPC · JPL
396456	2014 FF_{16}	—	September 26, 2005	Kitt Peak	Spacewatch	THM	2.3 km	MPC · JPL
396457	2014 FS_{17}	—	February 9, 2008	Kitt Peak	Spacewatch	·	2.9 km	MPC · JPL
396458	2014 FL_{18}	—	September 29, 2005	Mount Lemmon	Mount Lemmon Survey	·	750 m	MPC · JPL
396459	2014 FR_{19}	—	August 10, 2005	Siding Spring	SSS	·	4.0 km	MPC · JPL
396460	2014 FW_{19}	—	May 29, 2003	Kitt Peak	Spacewatch	·	2.0 km	MPC · JPL
396461	2014 FT_{20}	—	March 14, 2007	Mount Lemmon	Mount Lemmon Survey	·	880 m	MPC · JPL
396462	2014 FZ_{20}	—	March 12, 2000	Kitt Peak	Spacewatch	·	1.1 km	MPC · JPL
396463	2014 FU_{23}	—	June 21, 2010	WISE	WISE	·	2.3 km	MPC · JPL
396464	2014 FE_{32}	—	February 11, 2008	Kitt Peak	Spacewatch	LIX	4.4 km	MPC · JPL
396465	2014 FZ_{34}	—	September 13, 2007	Mount Lemmon	Mount Lemmon Survey	·	1.8 km	MPC · JPL
396466	2014 FB_{35}	—	December 4, 2005	Kitt Peak	Spacewatch	MAS	650 m	MPC · JPL
396467	2014 FG_{35}	—	September 3, 1999	Kitt Peak	Spacewatch	·	3.7 km	MPC · JPL
396468	2014 FP_{35}	—	November 2, 2008	Mount Lemmon	Mount Lemmon Survey	(5)	1.6 km	MPC · JPL
396469	2014 FQ_{35}	—	January 8, 2006	Mount Lemmon	Mount Lemmon Survey	V	1.0 km	MPC · JPL
396470	2014 FV_{35}	—	July 12, 2010	WISE	WISE	·	2.1 km	MPC · JPL
396471	2014 FA_{36}	—	April 15, 2001	Kitt Peak	Spacewatch	·	2.1 km	MPC · JPL
396472	2014 FF_{36}	—	December 5, 2005	Mount Lemmon	Mount Lemmon Survey	NYS	1.2 km	MPC · JPL
396473	2014 FH_{36}	—	December 20, 2004	Mount Lemmon	Mount Lemmon Survey	·	1.4 km	MPC · JPL
396474	2014 FJ_{36}	—	February 3, 2009	Kitt Peak	Spacewatch	NEM	2.4 km	MPC · JPL
396475	2014 FS_{36}	—	March 11, 2005	Kitt Peak	Spacewatch	·	1.9 km	MPC · JPL
396476	2014 FV_{36}	—	September 16, 2003	Kitt Peak	Spacewatch	·	1.6 km	MPC · JPL
396477	2014 FG_{37}	—	September 30, 2003	Kitt Peak	Spacewatch	·	1.8 km	MPC · JPL
396478	2014 FF_{39}	—	January 13, 2005	Kitt Peak	Spacewatch	·	1.9 km	MPC · JPL
396479	2014 FG_{40}	—	April 7, 2003	Kitt Peak	Spacewatch	·	1.2 km	MPC · JPL
396480	2014 FS_{41}	—	May 29, 2003	Kitt Peak	Spacewatch	·	1.6 km	MPC · JPL
396481	2014 FL_{42}	—	February 20, 2009	Kitt Peak	Spacewatch	·	1.9 km	MPC · JPL
396482	2014 FQ_{42}	—	January 18, 2008	Mount Lemmon	Mount Lemmon Survey	·	3.2 km	MPC · JPL
396483	2014 FE_{47}	—	April 25, 2007	Mount Lemmon	Mount Lemmon Survey	·	1.1 km	MPC · JPL
396484	2014 FH_{47}	—	October 8, 2008	Mount Lemmon	Mount Lemmon Survey	·	1.3 km	MPC · JPL
396485	2014 FK_{47}	—	March 18, 2010	Kitt Peak	Spacewatch	·	1.4 km	MPC · JPL
396486	2014 FT_{47}	—	March 21, 2001	Kitt Peak	Spacewatch	·	710 m	MPC · JPL
396487	2014 FA_{48}	—	April 7, 2010	Mount Lemmon	Mount Lemmon Survey	·	2.3 km	MPC · JPL
396488	2014 FJ_{48}	—	March 25, 2006	Catalina	CSS	·	2.6 km	MPC · JPL
396489	2014 FM_{48}	—	March 27, 2003	Kitt Peak	Spacewatch	·	3.9 km	MPC · JPL
396490	2014 FN_{48}	—	May 2, 2003	Kitt Peak	Spacewatch	·	3.8 km	MPC · JPL
396491	2014 FK_{49}	—	March 30, 1992	Kitt Peak	Spacewatch	·	3.1 km	MPC · JPL
396492	2014 FL_{49}	—	March 15, 2007	Mount Lemmon	Mount Lemmon Survey	·	1.6 km	MPC · JPL
396493	2014 FM_{49}	—	April 2, 2005	Catalina	CSS	·	2.5 km	MPC · JPL
396494	2014 FG_{50}	—	March 24, 2003	Kitt Peak	Spacewatch	NYS	1.3 km	MPC · JPL
396495	2014 FH_{50}	—	April 4, 2003	Kitt Peak	Spacewatch	·	1.2 km	MPC · JPL
396496	2014 FR_{50}	—	March 19, 2004	Socorro	LINEAR	·	790 m	MPC · JPL
396497	2014 FL_{51}	—	April 8, 2003	Kitt Peak	Spacewatch	MAS	790 m	MPC · JPL
396498	2014 FD_{53}	—	March 23, 2003	Kitt Peak	Spacewatch	TIR	2.5 km	MPC · JPL
396499	2014 FF_{53}	—	May 17, 2010	Mount Lemmon	Mount Lemmon Survey	·	1.4 km	MPC · JPL
396500	2014 FA_{54}	—	March 23, 2006	Kitt Peak	Spacewatch	·	1.4 km	MPC · JPL

== 396501–396600 ==
back to top

Designation			Discovery			Properties		Ref
Permanent	Provisional	Named after	Date	Site	Discoverer(s)	Category	Diam.	Ref
396501	2014 FG_{54}	—	April 30, 2006	Catalina	CSS	·	2.1 km	MPC · JPL
396502	2014 FE_{56}	—	March 29, 2004	Catalina	CSS	·	780 m	MPC · JPL
396503	2014 FP_{57}	—	November 8, 2008	Kitt Peak	Spacewatch	·	2.6 km	MPC · JPL
396504	2014 GB_{2}	—	March 17, 2004	Kitt Peak	Spacewatch	·	710 m	MPC · JPL
396505	2014 GM_{2}	—	October 8, 2005	Kitt Peak	Spacewatch	·	2.8 km	MPC · JPL
396506	2014 GU_{5}	—	April 19, 2004	Kitt Peak	Spacewatch	·	3.6 km	MPC · JPL
396507	2014 GA_{6}	—	March 7, 2005	Socorro	LINEAR	·	2.3 km	MPC · JPL
396508	2014 GH_{6}	—	January 19, 2008	Mount Lemmon	Mount Lemmon Survey	·	3.2 km	MPC · JPL
396509	2014 GO_{8}	—	April 6, 2010	Kitt Peak	Spacewatch	·	2.2 km	MPC · JPL
396510	2014 GW_{8}	—	February 9, 2010	Mount Lemmon	Mount Lemmon Survey	NYS	1.2 km	MPC · JPL
396511	2014 GO_{9}	—	January 13, 2005	Kitt Peak	Spacewatch	·	2.0 km	MPC · JPL
396512	2014 GL_{11}	—	April 15, 2010	WISE	WISE	·	1.8 km	MPC · JPL
396513	2014 GX_{11}	—	April 5, 2003	Kitt Peak	Spacewatch	·	1.2 km	MPC · JPL
396514	2014 GU_{12}	—	March 22, 2001	Kitt Peak	Spacewatch	EUN	1.5 km	MPC · JPL
396515	2014 GE_{13}	—	May 6, 2010	Mount Lemmon	Mount Lemmon Survey	·	1.3 km	MPC · JPL
396516	2014 GN_{13}	—	September 13, 2007	Mount Lemmon	Mount Lemmon Survey	·	2.0 km	MPC · JPL
396517	2014 GB_{16}	—	April 30, 2003	Kitt Peak	Spacewatch	·	1.8 km	MPC · JPL
396518	2014 GN_{16}	—	April 30, 2006	Kitt Peak	Spacewatch	(5)	1.2 km	MPC · JPL
396519	2014 GD_{18}	—	January 18, 2008	Mount Lemmon	Mount Lemmon Survey	TEL ·	3.3 km	MPC · JPL
396520	2014 GJ_{18}	—	February 20, 2010	WISE	WISE	ADE	1.8 km	MPC · JPL
396521	2014 GM_{26}	—	March 6, 2003	Anderson Mesa	LONEOS	NYS	1.2 km	MPC · JPL
396522	2014 GP_{27}	—	March 4, 2005	Mount Lemmon	Mount Lemmon Survey	MIS	2.2 km	MPC · JPL
396523	2014 GB_{28}	—	October 12, 2007	Mount Lemmon	Mount Lemmon Survey	·	1.6 km	MPC · JPL
396524	2014 GK_{28}	—	April 19, 2004	Socorro	LINEAR	·	690 m	MPC · JPL
396525	2014 GN_{28}	—	January 31, 2006	Kitt Peak	Spacewatch	NYS	1.1 km	MPC · JPL
396526	2014 GO_{28}	—	October 10, 1999	Kitt Peak	Spacewatch	EUN	1.5 km	MPC · JPL
396527	2014 GR_{28}	—	April 21, 2004	Kitt Peak	Spacewatch	·	590 m	MPC · JPL
396528	2014 GQ_{30}	—	September 30, 1995	Kitt Peak	Spacewatch	·	1.9 km	MPC · JPL
396529	2014 GU_{30}	—	May 10, 2003	Kitt Peak	Spacewatch	NYS	1.1 km	MPC · JPL
396530	2014 GS_{31}	—	September 23, 2008	Mount Lemmon	Mount Lemmon Survey	·	770 m	MPC · JPL
396531	2014 GM_{36}	—	March 10, 2003	Socorro	LINEAR	·	3.1 km	MPC · JPL
396532	2014 GZ_{36}	—	December 27, 2006	Mount Lemmon	Mount Lemmon Survey	·	700 m	MPC · JPL
396533	2014 GB_{37}	—	May 21, 2006	Kitt Peak	Spacewatch	HNS	1.4 km	MPC · JPL
396534	2014 GG_{38}	—	April 25, 2003	Anderson Mesa	LONEOS	·	5.0 km	MPC · JPL
396535	2014 GP_{38}	—	March 8, 2005	Catalina	CSS	·	1.8 km	MPC · JPL
396536	2014 GO_{40}	—	November 25, 2005	Mount Lemmon	Mount Lemmon Survey	·	750 m	MPC · JPL
396537	2014 GM_{43}	—	January 7, 2006	Kitt Peak	Spacewatch	·	2.2 km	MPC · JPL
396538	2014 GN_{44}	—	July 10, 2007	Siding Spring	SSS	PHO	1.4 km	MPC · JPL
396539	6283 P-L	—	September 24, 1960	Palomar	C. J. van Houten, I. van Houten-Groeneveld, T. Gehrels	NYS	1.1 km	MPC · JPL
396540	1986 JJ	—	May 10, 1986	Kitt Peak	Spacewatch	H	590 m	MPC · JPL
396541	1994 SU_{7}	—	September 28, 1994	Kitt Peak	Spacewatch	·	2.6 km	MPC · JPL
396542	1994 UR_{5}	—	October 28, 1994	Kitt Peak	Spacewatch	EOS	2.1 km	MPC · JPL
396543	1996 AD_{11}	—	January 13, 1996	Kitt Peak	Spacewatch	·	1.6 km	MPC · JPL
396544	1996 BJ_{9}	—	January 20, 1996	Kitt Peak	Spacewatch	·	2.0 km	MPC · JPL
396545	1996 JY_{3}	—	May 9, 1996	Kitt Peak	Spacewatch	NYS	1.0 km	MPC · JPL
396546	1996 VZ_{24}	—	November 10, 1996	Kitt Peak	Spacewatch	·	880 m	MPC · JPL
396547	1997 JQ_{2}	—	May 3, 1997	Kitt Peak	Spacewatch	·	680 m	MPC · JPL
396548	1997 RJ_{12}	—	September 6, 1997	Caussols	ODAS	·	980 m	MPC · JPL
396549	1998 MD_{1}	—	June 16, 1998	Kitt Peak	Spacewatch	·	1.7 km	MPC · JPL
396550	1998 QK_{30}	—	August 26, 1998	Xinglong	SCAP	(5)	1.4 km	MPC · JPL
396551	1998 QT_{73}	—	August 24, 1998	Socorro	LINEAR	·	3.0 km	MPC · JPL
396552	1998 RS_{4}	—	September 14, 1998	Socorro	LINEAR	·	1.8 km	MPC · JPL
396553	1998 SW_{68}	—	September 19, 1998	Socorro	LINEAR	·	5.1 km	MPC · JPL
396554	1998 VK_{43}	—	November 15, 1998	Kitt Peak	Spacewatch	EUN	1.4 km	MPC · JPL
396555	1999 FG_{70}	—	March 20, 1999	Apache Point	SDSS	·	790 m	MPC · JPL
396556	1999 TK_{21}	—	October 5, 1999	Socorro	LINEAR	H	550 m	MPC · JPL
396557	1999 TE_{79}	—	October 11, 1999	Kitt Peak	Spacewatch	·	2.7 km	MPC · JPL
396558	1999 TG_{199}	—	October 12, 1999	Socorro	LINEAR	TIR	4.0 km	MPC · JPL
396559	1999 TA_{287}	—	October 10, 1999	Socorro	LINEAR	·	3.7 km	MPC · JPL
396560	1999 TD_{299}	—	October 2, 1999	Kitt Peak	Spacewatch	·	870 m	MPC · JPL
396561	1999 TQ_{306}	—	October 2, 1999	Kitt Peak	Spacewatch	·	2.8 km	MPC · JPL
396562	1999 TQ_{314}	—	October 11, 1999	Kitt Peak	Spacewatch	·	930 m	MPC · JPL
396563	1999 UV_{34}	—	October 31, 1999	Kitt Peak	Spacewatch	·	2.1 km	MPC · JPL
396564	1999 VS_{95}	—	November 9, 1999	Socorro	LINEAR	H	600 m	MPC · JPL
396565	1999 VH_{143}	—	November 9, 1999	Socorro	LINEAR	H	590 m	MPC · JPL
396566	1999 VV_{191}	—	November 12, 1999	Socorro	LINEAR	·	930 m	MPC · JPL
396567	1999 YH_{15}	—	December 31, 1999	Kitt Peak	Spacewatch	3:2	5.5 km	MPC · JPL
396568	2000 AZ_{101}	—	January 5, 2000	Socorro	LINEAR	·	1.9 km	MPC · JPL
396569	2000 DF_{14}	—	February 28, 2000	Kitt Peak	Spacewatch	·	2.1 km	MPC · JPL
396570	2000 DX_{113}	—	February 27, 2000	Kitt Peak	Spacewatch	·	680 m	MPC · JPL
396571	2000 EJ_{36}	—	March 5, 2000	Socorro	LINEAR	·	1.1 km	MPC · JPL
396572	2000 GV_{130}	—	April 6, 2000	Kitt Peak	Spacewatch	·	590 m	MPC · JPL
396573	2000 HF_{2}	—	April 3, 2000	Kitt Peak	Spacewatch	·	1.7 km	MPC · JPL
396574	2000 HK_{89}	—	April 29, 2000	Socorro	LINEAR	·	830 m	MPC · JPL
396575	2000 JO_{7}	—	May 1, 2000	Kitt Peak	Spacewatch	·	2.2 km	MPC · JPL
396576	2000 JW_{42}	—	May 7, 2000	Socorro	LINEAR	·	2.9 km	MPC · JPL
396577	2000 KH_{38}	—	May 24, 2000	Kitt Peak	Spacewatch	·	940 m	MPC · JPL
396578	2000 QG_{102}	—	August 28, 2000	Socorro	LINEAR	·	1.4 km	MPC · JPL
396579	2000 QC_{169}	—	August 31, 2000	Socorro	LINEAR	·	1.4 km	MPC · JPL
396580	2000 QO_{230}	—	August 31, 2000	Socorro	LINEAR	·	1.3 km	MPC · JPL
396581	2000 RL_{36}	—	September 2, 2000	Haleakala	NEAT	·	1.8 km	MPC · JPL
396582	2000 RM_{78}	—	September 8, 2000	Kitt Peak	Spacewatch	·	2.4 km	MPC · JPL
396583	2000 SS	—	September 19, 2000	Kitt Peak	Spacewatch	·	860 m	MPC · JPL
396584	2000 SZ_{13}	—	September 22, 2000	Socorro	LINEAR	·	1.3 km	MPC · JPL
396585	2000 SG_{72}	—	September 24, 2000	Socorro	LINEAR	·	1.2 km	MPC · JPL
396586	2000 UO	—	October 3, 2000	Socorro	LINEAR	·	2.0 km	MPC · JPL
396587	2000 UC_{6}	—	October 24, 2000	Socorro	LINEAR	·	3.6 km	MPC · JPL
396588	2001 BT_{20}	—	January 19, 2001	Socorro	LINEAR	·	1.3 km	MPC · JPL
396589	2001 CW_{31}	—	February 5, 2001	Socorro	LINEAR	·	2.9 km	MPC · JPL
396590	2001 FS_{112}	—	March 4, 2001	Socorro	LINEAR	·	1.6 km	MPC · JPL
396591	2001 FD_{130}	—	March 24, 2001	Socorro	LINEAR	·	1.5 km	MPC · JPL
396592	2001 FZ_{141}	—	March 23, 2001	Anderson Mesa	LONEOS	·	1.4 km	MPC · JPL
396593	2001 HC	—	April 16, 2001	Socorro	LINEAR	ATE	550 m	MPC · JPL
396594	2001 MZ_{1}	—	June 18, 2001	Palomar	NEAT	·	2.4 km	MPC · JPL
396595	2001 OL_{35}	—	July 20, 2001	Palomar	NEAT	·	800 m	MPC · JPL
396596	2001 OP_{89}	—	July 22, 2001	Socorro	LINEAR	·	2.8 km	MPC · JPL
396597	2001 PQ_{4}	—	August 10, 2001	Palomar	NEAT	EUN	1.4 km	MPC · JPL
396598	2001 PJ_{19}	—	August 10, 2001	Palomar	NEAT	·	870 m	MPC · JPL
396599	2001 PN_{41}	—	August 11, 2001	Palomar	NEAT	·	3.5 km	MPC · JPL
396600	2001 PG_{57}	—	August 14, 2001	Haleakala	NEAT	·	800 m	MPC · JPL

== 396601–396700 ==
back to top

Designation			Discovery			Properties		Ref
Permanent	Provisional	Named after	Date	Site	Discoverer(s)	Category	Diam.	Ref
396601	2001 QF_{85}	—	August 19, 2001	Socorro	LINEAR	·	1.8 km	MPC · JPL
396602	2001 QU_{164}	—	August 22, 2001	Haleakala	NEAT	·	770 m	MPC · JPL
396603	2001 QP_{192}	—	August 22, 2001	Socorro	LINEAR	JUN	1.1 km	MPC · JPL
396604	2001 QO_{229}	—	August 24, 2001	Anderson Mesa	LONEOS	·	2.1 km	MPC · JPL
396605	2001 RC_{18}	—	September 12, 2001	Socorro	LINEAR	·	1.7 km	MPC · JPL
396606	2001 RD_{38}	—	September 8, 2001	Socorro	LINEAR	·	1.7 km	MPC · JPL
396607	2001 RB_{147}	—	September 9, 2001	Anderson Mesa	LONEOS	·	2.5 km	MPC · JPL
396608	2001 RY_{151}	—	September 11, 2001	Anderson Mesa	LONEOS	·	2.2 km	MPC · JPL
396609	2001 SW_{11}	—	September 16, 2001	Socorro	LINEAR	·	1.9 km	MPC · JPL
396610	2001 SF_{23}	—	September 16, 2001	Socorro	LINEAR	·	600 m	MPC · JPL
396611	2001 SG_{98}	—	September 20, 2001	Socorro	LINEAR	V	720 m	MPC · JPL
396612	2001 SS_{99}	—	September 19, 2001	Kitt Peak	Spacewatch	·	2.4 km	MPC · JPL
396613	2001 SV_{103}	—	September 20, 2001	Socorro	LINEAR	·	1.7 km	MPC · JPL
396614	2001 SR_{115}	—	September 21, 2001	Socorro	LINEAR	·	570 m	MPC · JPL
396615	2001 SB_{126}	—	September 16, 2001	Socorro	LINEAR	·	630 m	MPC · JPL
396616	2001 SL_{136}	—	September 16, 2001	Socorro	LINEAR	·	540 m	MPC · JPL
396617	2001 SK_{203}	—	September 19, 2001	Socorro	LINEAR	EUN	1.2 km	MPC · JPL
396618	2001 SW_{325}	—	September 17, 2001	Anderson Mesa	LONEOS	·	630 m	MPC · JPL
396619	2001 TU_{26}	—	October 14, 2001	Socorro	LINEAR	·	900 m	MPC · JPL
396620	2001 TX_{27}	—	October 14, 2001	Socorro	LINEAR	·	1.6 km	MPC · JPL
396621	2001 TY_{31}	—	October 14, 2001	Socorro	LINEAR	·	950 m	MPC · JPL
396622	2001 TU_{85}	—	October 14, 2001	Socorro	LINEAR	·	1.2 km	MPC · JPL
396623	2001 TP_{124}	—	September 19, 2001	Anderson Mesa	LONEOS	·	2.3 km	MPC · JPL
396624	2001 TE_{160}	—	October 15, 2001	Haleakala	NEAT	·	790 m	MPC · JPL
396625	2001 TK_{232}	—	September 25, 2001	Socorro	LINEAR	·	970 m	MPC · JPL
396626	2001 TX_{236}	—	September 12, 2001	Socorro	LINEAR	·	570 m	MPC · JPL
396627	2001 UB_{15}	—	October 23, 2001	Socorro	LINEAR	H	720 m	MPC · JPL
396628	2001 UK_{56}	—	October 17, 2001	Socorro	LINEAR	·	530 m	MPC · JPL
396629	2001 UU_{113}	—	October 22, 2001	Socorro	LINEAR	·	2.1 km	MPC · JPL
396630	2001 UF_{117}	—	October 22, 2001	Socorro	LINEAR	·	660 m	MPC · JPL
396631	2001 UZ_{190}	—	October 18, 2001	Kitt Peak	Spacewatch	·	940 m	MPC · JPL
396632	2001 UZ_{211}	—	October 21, 2001	Socorro	LINEAR	V	620 m	MPC · JPL
396633	2001 UY_{214}	—	October 23, 2001	Kitt Peak	Spacewatch	·	2.1 km	MPC · JPL
396634	2001 VN_{13}	—	November 10, 2001	Socorro	LINEAR	·	910 m	MPC · JPL
396635	2001 VC_{38}	—	November 9, 2001	Socorro	LINEAR	·	670 m	MPC · JPL
396636	2001 VQ_{76}	—	November 12, 2001	Socorro	LINEAR	H	650 m	MPC · JPL
396637	2001 VC_{105}	—	November 12, 2001	Socorro	LINEAR	·	3.3 km	MPC · JPL
396638	2001 WR_{2}	—	November 17, 2001	Socorro	LINEAR	·	1.0 km	MPC · JPL
396639	2001 WH_{21}	—	November 18, 2001	Socorro	LINEAR	EOS	1.7 km	MPC · JPL
396640	2001 WZ_{64}	—	November 20, 2001	Socorro	LINEAR	·	2.3 km	MPC · JPL
396641	2001 WK_{87}	—	November 19, 2001	Socorro	LINEAR	·	770 m	MPC · JPL
396642	2001 XF_{31}	—	December 11, 2001	Socorro	LINEAR	H	710 m	MPC · JPL
396643	2001 XS_{104}	—	December 14, 2001	Kitt Peak	Spacewatch	·	2.7 km	MPC · JPL
396644	2001 XQ_{236}	—	December 15, 2001	Socorro	LINEAR	NYS	1.1 km	MPC · JPL
396645	2002 AD_{21}	—	December 9, 2001	Socorro	LINEAR	H	610 m	MPC · JPL
396646	2002 AT_{193}	—	January 12, 2002	Socorro	LINEAR	H	800 m	MPC · JPL
396647	2002 BY_{17}	—	January 21, 2002	Socorro	LINEAR	·	2.9 km	MPC · JPL
396648	2002 CH_{32}	—	February 6, 2002	Socorro	LINEAR	·	1.2 km	MPC · JPL
396649	2002 CU_{186}	—	January 22, 2002	Kitt Peak	Spacewatch	·	3.4 km	MPC · JPL
396650	2002 EE_{51}	—	February 13, 2002	Kitt Peak	Spacewatch	L4	10 km	MPC · JPL
396651	2002 EH_{93}	—	March 14, 2002	Socorro	LINEAR	·	1.7 km	MPC · JPL
396652	2002 GU_{189}	—	April 5, 2002	Palomar	NEAT	·	2.6 km	MPC · JPL
396653	2002 HO_{17}	—	April 21, 2002	Palomar	NEAT	PHO	1.4 km	MPC · JPL
396654	2002 JT_{60}	—	May 9, 2002	Kitt Peak	Spacewatch	·	3.8 km	MPC · JPL
396655	2002 JL_{122}	—	April 21, 2002	Socorro	LINEAR	EUP	4.3 km	MPC · JPL
396656	2002 MZ_{3}	—	June 21, 2002	La Palma	La Palma	·	1.5 km	MPC · JPL
396657	2002 NW_{7}	—	July 11, 2002	Socorro	LINEAR	·	3.5 km	MPC · JPL
396658	2002 NE_{23}	—	July 9, 2002	Socorro	LINEAR	·	2.2 km	MPC · JPL
396659	2002 NO_{63}	—	July 8, 2002	Palomar	NEAT	BRG	1.5 km	MPC · JPL
396660	2002 NC_{71}	—	July 8, 2002	Palomar	NEAT	·	1.1 km	MPC · JPL
396661	2002 OS_{33}	—	July 21, 2002	Palomar	NEAT	·	750 m	MPC · JPL
396662	2002 PY_{19}	—	July 22, 2002	Palomar	NEAT	·	1.1 km	MPC · JPL
396663	2002 PH_{25}	—	August 6, 2002	Palomar	NEAT	·	980 m	MPC · JPL
396664	2002 PX_{31}	—	August 6, 2002	Palomar	NEAT	(5)	1.2 km	MPC · JPL
396665	2002 PK_{93}	—	August 14, 2002	Palomar	NEAT	JUN	1 km	MPC · JPL
396666	2002 PQ_{116}	—	August 14, 2002	Anderson Mesa	LONEOS	(1547)	1.9 km	MPC · JPL
396667	2002 PS_{121}	—	August 13, 2002	Anderson Mesa	LONEOS	·	1.1 km	MPC · JPL
396668	2002 PZ_{155}	—	August 8, 2002	Palomar	S. F. Hönig	(5)	1.2 km	MPC · JPL
396669	2002 QZ_{34}	—	August 29, 2002	Palomar	NEAT	(5)	1.5 km	MPC · JPL
396670	2002 QN_{70}	—	August 28, 2002	Palomar	NEAT	·	870 m	MPC · JPL
396671	2002 RQ_{1}	—	September 3, 2002	Palomar	NEAT	·	1.7 km	MPC · JPL
396672	2002 RW_{50}	—	September 5, 2002	Socorro	LINEAR	·	1.2 km	MPC · JPL
396673	2002 RR_{84}	—	September 5, 2002	Socorro	LINEAR	·	1.5 km	MPC · JPL
396674	2002 RM_{98}	—	September 5, 2002	Socorro	LINEAR	JUN	1.4 km	MPC · JPL
396675	2002 RH_{176}	—	September 13, 2002	Palomar	NEAT	·	730 m	MPC · JPL
396676	2002 RF_{184}	—	August 16, 2002	Socorro	LINEAR	TIR	3.4 km	MPC · JPL
396677	2002 RQ_{184}	—	September 12, 2002	Palomar	NEAT	EUN	1.5 km	MPC · JPL
396678	2002 RP_{192}	—	September 12, 2002	Palomar	NEAT	·	720 m	MPC · JPL
396679	2002 RL_{229}	—	September 14, 2002	Haleakala	NEAT	·	1.5 km	MPC · JPL
396680	2002 ST	—	September 23, 2002	Palomar	NEAT	·	1.6 km	MPC · JPL
396681	2002 SK_{5}	—	September 27, 2002	Palomar	NEAT	·	960 m	MPC · JPL
396682	2002 SW_{62}	—	August 12, 2002	Socorro	LINEAR	·	1.6 km	MPC · JPL
396683	2002 TJ_{1}	—	October 1, 2002	Anderson Mesa	LONEOS	·	1.4 km	MPC · JPL
396684	2002 TM_{14}	—	October 1, 2002	Anderson Mesa	LONEOS	·	640 m	MPC · JPL
396685	2002 TQ_{14}	—	October 1, 2002	Haleakala	NEAT	·	1.6 km	MPC · JPL
396686	2002 TJ_{51}	—	October 2, 2002	Socorro	LINEAR	·	1.4 km	MPC · JPL
396687	2002 TJ_{63}	—	October 3, 2002	Campo Imperatore	CINEOS	EUN	1.4 km	MPC · JPL
396688	2002 TL_{78}	—	October 1, 2002	Socorro	LINEAR	·	1.5 km	MPC · JPL
396689	2002 TA_{98}	—	October 3, 2002	Socorro	LINEAR	·	980 m	MPC · JPL
396690	2002 TC_{106}	—	October 4, 2002	Kitt Peak	Spacewatch	·	590 m	MPC · JPL
396691	2002 TL_{125}	—	October 4, 2002	Palomar	NEAT	EUN	1.3 km	MPC · JPL
396692	2002 TE_{142}	—	October 3, 2002	Socorro	LINEAR	·	1.1 km	MPC · JPL
396693	2002 TN_{146}	—	October 4, 2002	Socorro	LINEAR	·	730 m	MPC · JPL
396694	2002 TJ_{156}	—	October 5, 2002	Palomar	NEAT	(5)	1.3 km	MPC · JPL
396695	2002 TS_{175}	—	October 4, 2002	Anderson Mesa	LONEOS	EUN	1.6 km	MPC · JPL
396696	2002 TZ_{220}	—	October 6, 2002	Socorro	LINEAR	EUN	1.6 km	MPC · JPL
396697	2002 TM_{235}	—	October 6, 2002	Socorro	LINEAR	EUN	1.7 km	MPC · JPL
396698	2002 TR_{254}	—	October 3, 2002	Socorro	LINEAR	·	1.9 km	MPC · JPL
396699	2002 TG_{262}	—	October 2, 2002	Socorro	LINEAR	·	2.0 km	MPC · JPL
396700	2002 TY_{271}	—	October 9, 2002	Socorro	LINEAR	·	1.6 km	MPC · JPL

== 396701–396800 ==
back to top

Designation			Discovery			Properties		Ref
Permanent	Provisional	Named after	Date	Site	Discoverer(s)	Category	Diam.	Ref
396701	2002 TV_{297}	—	October 11, 2002	Kitt Peak	Spacewatch	CYB	3.3 km	MPC · JPL
396702	2002 TJ_{352}	—	October 10, 2002	Apache Point	SDSS	(5)	950 m	MPC · JPL
396703	2002 TU_{353}	—	October 10, 2002	Apache Point	SDSS	·	1.8 km	MPC · JPL
396704	2002 TY_{366}	—	October 10, 2002	Apache Point	SDSS	·	1.4 km	MPC · JPL
396705	2002 TG_{375}	—	October 9, 2002	Palomar	NEAT	·	2.0 km	MPC · JPL
396706	2002 UG_{12}	—	October 30, 2002	Socorro	LINEAR	·	3.1 km	MPC · JPL
396707	2002 UU_{36}	—	October 30, 2002	Kitt Peak	Spacewatch	·	320 m	MPC · JPL
396708	2002 UM_{74}	—	October 30, 2002	Palomar	NEAT	·	630 m	MPC · JPL
396709	2002 VZ_{39}	—	November 7, 2002	Kingsnake	J. V. McClusky	·	1.9 km	MPC · JPL
396710	2002 VC_{64}	—	November 6, 2002	Anderson Mesa	LONEOS	·	2.4 km	MPC · JPL
396711	2002 VF_{71}	—	November 7, 2002	Socorro	LINEAR	(194)	1.8 km	MPC · JPL
396712	2002 VZ_{86}	—	November 8, 2002	Socorro	LINEAR	·	2.9 km	MPC · JPL
396713	2002 VK_{98}	—	November 12, 2002	Socorro	LINEAR	H	650 m	MPC · JPL
396714	2002 VZ_{100}	—	November 11, 2002	Socorro	LINEAR	·	1.1 km	MPC · JPL
396715	2002 VT_{126}	—	November 13, 2002	Palomar	NEAT	·	2.6 km	MPC · JPL
396716	2002 VV_{145}	—	November 15, 2002	Palomar	NEAT	·	1.9 km	MPC · JPL
396717	2002 VJ_{147}	—	November 3, 2002	Palomar	NEAT	·	670 m	MPC · JPL
396718	2002 VN_{147}	—	November 4, 2002	Palomar	NEAT	·	1.2 km	MPC · JPL
396719	2002 WV_{1}	—	November 23, 2002	Palomar	NEAT	·	2.9 km	MPC · JPL
396720	2002 WT_{3}	—	November 24, 2002	Palomar	NEAT	·	1.5 km	MPC · JPL
396721	2002 XG_{50}	—	December 10, 2002	Socorro	LINEAR	·	860 m	MPC · JPL
396722	2002 XV_{117}	—	December 10, 2002	Palomar	NEAT	·	2.1 km	MPC · JPL
396723	2003 AE_{23}	—	January 7, 2003	Socorro	LINEAR	·	370 m	MPC · JPL
396724	2003 DT_{24}	—	February 28, 2003	Socorro	LINEAR	·	2.9 km	MPC · JPL
396725	2003 EZ_{10}	—	March 6, 2003	Palomar	NEAT	·	1.1 km	MPC · JPL
396726	2003 FS_{21}	—	March 25, 2003	Kitt Peak	Spacewatch	PHO	1.0 km	MPC · JPL
396727	2003 FA_{48}	—	March 24, 2003	Kitt Peak	Spacewatch	NYS	860 m	MPC · JPL
396728	2003 HZ_{25}	—	April 25, 2003	Kitt Peak	Spacewatch	·	920 m	MPC · JPL
396729	2003 KG_{2}	—	May 22, 2003	Kitt Peak	Spacewatch	·	3.6 km	MPC · JPL
396730	2003 KX_{16}	—	May 29, 2003	Haleakala	NEAT	APO	700 m	MPC · JPL
396731	2003 MV_{12}	—	June 29, 2003	Socorro	LINEAR	·	5.6 km	MPC · JPL
396732	2003 OA_{16}	—	July 23, 2003	Palomar	NEAT	·	3.9 km	MPC · JPL
396733	2003 PK_{8}	—	August 3, 2003	Needville	J. Dellinger, W. G. Dillon	·	1.1 km	MPC · JPL
396734	2003 PK_{9}	—	August 4, 2003	Kitt Peak	Spacewatch	ERI	1.6 km	MPC · JPL
396735	2003 QD_{11}	—	August 20, 2003	Campo Imperatore	CINEOS	·	1.4 km	MPC · JPL
396736	2003 QQ_{57}	—	August 23, 2003	Palomar	NEAT	·	2.4 km	MPC · JPL
396737	2003 QZ_{100}	—	August 28, 2003	Haleakala	NEAT	·	1.0 km	MPC · JPL
396738	2003 RF_{8}	—	August 21, 2003	Socorro	LINEAR	·	5.2 km	MPC · JPL
396739	2003 RV_{19}	—	September 15, 2003	Anderson Mesa	LONEOS	(11097) · CYB	3.0 km	MPC · JPL
396740	2003 SD_{9}	—	September 17, 2003	Kitt Peak	Spacewatch	·	1.3 km	MPC · JPL
396741	2003 SE_{10}	—	September 17, 2003	Kitt Peak	Spacewatch	NYS	1.4 km	MPC · JPL
396742	2003 SQ_{33}	—	September 17, 2003	Palomar	NEAT	·	1.5 km	MPC · JPL
396743	2003 SC_{85}	—	September 16, 2003	Palomar	NEAT	H	730 m	MPC · JPL
396744	2003 SF_{87}	—	September 17, 2003	Socorro	LINEAR	·	4.9 km	MPC · JPL
396745	2003 SH_{97}	—	September 19, 2003	Palomar	NEAT	·	3.3 km	MPC · JPL
396746	2003 SP_{140}	—	September 19, 2003	Palomar	NEAT	·	1.7 km	MPC · JPL
396747	2003 SQ_{219}	—	September 28, 2003	Desert Eagle	W. K. Y. Yeung	·	1.7 km	MPC · JPL
396748	2003 SJ_{281}	—	September 19, 2003	Kitt Peak	Spacewatch	·	3.7 km	MPC · JPL
396749	2003 SV_{304}	—	September 17, 2003	Palomar	NEAT	·	930 m	MPC · JPL
396750	2003 SM_{327}	—	September 19, 2003	Palomar	NEAT	·	4.0 km	MPC · JPL
396751	2003 SZ_{395}	—	September 26, 2003	Apache Point	SDSS	HNS	940 m	MPC · JPL
396752	2003 TC_{5}	—	October 1, 2003	Kitt Peak	Spacewatch	KON	2.9 km	MPC · JPL
396753	2003 UZ_{31}	—	October 16, 2003	Kitt Peak	Spacewatch	MAR	960 m	MPC · JPL
396754	2003 UJ_{55}	—	October 18, 2003	Palomar	NEAT	THB	5.7 km	MPC · JPL
396755	2003 UJ_{56}	—	October 19, 2003	Goodricke-Pigott	R. A. Tucker	·	1.2 km	MPC · JPL
396756	2003 UV_{62}	—	October 16, 2003	Palomar	NEAT	·	1.3 km	MPC · JPL
396757	2003 UR_{126}	—	October 20, 2003	Palomar	NEAT	·	1.2 km	MPC · JPL
396758	2003 UN_{245}	—	October 24, 2003	Socorro	LINEAR	DOR	2.6 km	MPC · JPL
396759	2003 UC_{256}	—	October 25, 2003	Socorro	LINEAR	·	1.4 km	MPC · JPL
396760	2003 UF_{330}	—	October 17, 2003	Kitt Peak	Spacewatch	·	1.4 km	MPC · JPL
396761	2003 UD_{341}	—	October 19, 2003	Apache Point	SDSS	·	3.0 km	MPC · JPL
396762	2003 UQ_{352}	—	October 19, 2003	Apache Point	SDSS	(5)	1.0 km	MPC · JPL
396763	2003 UB_{375}	—	October 22, 2003	Apache Point	SDSS	HNS	900 m	MPC · JPL
396764	2003 UG_{375}	—	October 22, 2003	Apache Point	SDSS	MAR	960 m	MPC · JPL
396765	2003 WN_{36}	—	October 29, 2003	Socorro	LINEAR	·	900 m	MPC · JPL
396766	2003 WD_{68}	—	November 19, 2003	Kitt Peak	Spacewatch	(5)	1.3 km	MPC · JPL
396767	2003 WV_{94}	—	November 19, 2003	Anderson Mesa	LONEOS	·	1.6 km	MPC · JPL
396768	2003 WF_{104}	—	November 21, 2003	Socorro	LINEAR	·	1.1 km	MPC · JPL
396769	2003 WW_{134}	—	November 21, 2003	Socorro	LINEAR	·	1.5 km	MPC · JPL
396770	2003 WY_{141}	—	November 21, 2003	Socorro	LINEAR	·	2.2 km	MPC · JPL
396771	2003 WP_{148}	—	November 24, 2003	Socorro	LINEAR	·	1.9 km	MPC · JPL
396772	2003 WT_{162}	—	October 29, 2003	Anderson Mesa	LONEOS	·	2.5 km	MPC · JPL
396773	2003 YB_{17}	—	December 17, 2003	Kitt Peak	Spacewatch	·	1.7 km	MPC · JPL
396774	2003 YH_{24}	—	November 18, 2003	Kitt Peak	Spacewatch	·	2.3 km	MPC · JPL
396775	2003 YU_{119}	—	December 27, 2003	Socorro	LINEAR	JUN	1.5 km	MPC · JPL
396776	2003 YA_{147}	—	December 29, 2003	Socorro	LINEAR	EUN	1.8 km	MPC · JPL
396777	2004 BZ_{42}	—	January 22, 2004	Palomar	NEAT	(32418)	2.7 km	MPC · JPL
396778	2004 BQ_{112}	—	January 27, 2004	Kitt Peak	Spacewatch	EUN	1.7 km	MPC · JPL
396779	2004 CO_{88}	—	February 11, 2004	Kitt Peak	Spacewatch	·	1.5 km	MPC · JPL
396780	2004 CO_{122}	—	February 12, 2004	Kitt Peak	Spacewatch	·	1.9 km	MPC · JPL
396781	2004 DQ_{57}	—	January 24, 2004	Socorro	LINEAR	·	2.0 km	MPC · JPL
396782	2004 DZ_{59}	—	February 26, 2004	Socorro	LINEAR	·	1.4 km	MPC · JPL
396783	2004 EH_{67}	—	March 15, 2004	Kitt Peak	Spacewatch	·	1.9 km	MPC · JPL
396784	2004 EG_{70}	—	March 15, 2004	Kitt Peak	Spacewatch	·	900 m	MPC · JPL
396785	2004 FS_{43}	—	March 19, 2004	Kitt Peak	Spacewatch	·	790 m	MPC · JPL
396786	2004 FV_{81}	—	March 17, 2004	Kitt Peak	Spacewatch	·	670 m	MPC · JPL
396787	2004 FH_{117}	—	March 27, 2004	Catalina	CSS	·	1.8 km	MPC · JPL
396788	2004 GU	—	April 9, 2004	Siding Spring	SSS	PHO	2.4 km	MPC · JPL
396789	2004 GH_{60}	—	April 14, 2004	Kitt Peak	Spacewatch	·	720 m	MPC · JPL
396790	2004 HD_{3}	—	April 16, 2004	Socorro	LINEAR	·	720 m	MPC · JPL
396791	2004 HP_{29}	—	April 21, 2004	Socorro	LINEAR	·	2.3 km	MPC · JPL
396792	2004 HF_{53}	—	April 25, 2004	Socorro	LINEAR	·	790 m	MPC · JPL
396793	2004 JN_{2}	—	May 9, 2004	Kitt Peak	Spacewatch	APO	350 m	MPC · JPL
396794	2004 KT	—	May 16, 2004	Siding Spring	SSS	APO +1km	1.0 km	MPC · JPL
396795	2004 NJ_{8}	—	July 14, 2004	Socorro	LINEAR	·	1.4 km	MPC · JPL
396796	2004 OA_{1}	—	July 16, 2004	Socorro	LINEAR	·	740 m	MPC · JPL
396797	2004 OC_{8}	—	July 16, 2004	Socorro	LINEAR	(2076)	830 m	MPC · JPL
396798	2004 OA_{9}	—	July 19, 2004	Anderson Mesa	LONEOS	·	740 m	MPC · JPL
396799	2004 OG_{12}	—	June 12, 2004	Siding Spring	SSS	·	1.2 km	MPC · JPL
396800	2004 PC_{6}	—	July 14, 2004	Socorro	LINEAR	·	880 m	MPC · JPL

== 396801–396900 ==
back to top

Designation			Discovery			Properties		Ref
Permanent	Provisional	Named after	Date	Site	Discoverer(s)	Category	Diam.	Ref
396801	2004 PM_{6}	—	August 6, 2004	Palomar	NEAT	·	980 m	MPC · JPL
396802	2004 PX_{13}	—	August 7, 2004	Palomar	NEAT	·	620 m	MPC · JPL
396803	2004 PS_{46}	—	August 8, 2004	Campo Imperatore	CINEOS	·	1.1 km	MPC · JPL
396804	2004 PS_{48}	—	August 8, 2004	Socorro	LINEAR	·	1.1 km	MPC · JPL
396805	2004 PM_{54}	—	August 8, 2004	Anderson Mesa	LONEOS	·	780 m	MPC · JPL
396806	2004 PW_{62}	—	August 10, 2004	Socorro	LINEAR	·	3.4 km	MPC · JPL
396807	2004 PX_{69}	—	August 7, 2004	Palomar	NEAT	·	1.6 km	MPC · JPL
396808	2004 PW_{87}	—	August 11, 2004	Socorro	LINEAR	·	2.6 km	MPC · JPL
396809	2004 PV_{89}	—	August 10, 2004	Socorro	LINEAR	·	950 m	MPC · JPL
396810	2004 PS_{100}	—	August 12, 2004	Socorro	LINEAR	·	1.2 km	MPC · JPL
396811	2004 PJ_{102}	—	August 12, 2004	Socorro	LINEAR	·	900 m	MPC · JPL
396812	2004 PT_{102}	—	August 12, 2004	Socorro	LINEAR	·	3.0 km	MPC · JPL
396813	2004 PS_{112}	—	August 8, 2004	Anderson Mesa	LONEOS	·	5.4 km	MPC · JPL
396814	2004 QX_{11}	—	August 21, 2004	Siding Spring	SSS	·	1.3 km	MPC · JPL
396815	2004 QG_{24}	—	August 27, 2004	Socorro	LINEAR	·	2.0 km	MPC · JPL
396816	2004 QU_{28}	—	August 17, 2004	Mauna Kea	D. J. Tholen	L4	8.3 km	MPC · JPL
396817	2004 RZ_{2}	—	September 6, 2004	Socorro	LINEAR	PHO	1.6 km	MPC · JPL
396818	2004 RJ_{3}	—	September 6, 2004	Socorro	LINEAR	H	540 m	MPC · JPL
396819	2004 RH_{50}	—	September 8, 2004	Socorro	LINEAR	·	2.3 km	MPC · JPL
396820	2004 RS_{50}	—	September 8, 2004	Socorro	LINEAR	·	2.6 km	MPC · JPL
396821	2004 RP_{51}	—	September 8, 2004	Socorro	LINEAR	V	740 m	MPC · JPL
396822	2004 RH_{56}	—	August 27, 2004	Anderson Mesa	LONEOS	·	2.1 km	MPC · JPL
396823	2004 RJ_{58}	—	September 8, 2004	Socorro	LINEAR	·	2.9 km	MPC · JPL
396824	2004 RR_{87}	—	September 7, 2004	Kitt Peak	Spacewatch	THM	2.2 km	MPC · JPL
396825	2004 RD_{91}	—	August 21, 2004	Catalina	CSS	·	2.8 km	MPC · JPL
396826	2004 RN_{93}	—	September 8, 2004	Socorro	LINEAR	·	740 m	MPC · JPL
396827	2004 RA_{112}	—	September 4, 2004	Palomar	NEAT	·	4.4 km	MPC · JPL
396828	2004 RE_{119}	—	September 7, 2004	Kitt Peak	Spacewatch	·	2.2 km	MPC · JPL
396829	2004 RY_{143}	—	September 8, 2004	Socorro	LINEAR	·	2.6 km	MPC · JPL
396830	2004 RV_{146}	—	September 9, 2004	Socorro	LINEAR	·	2.5 km	MPC · JPL
396831	2004 RJ_{154}	—	September 10, 2004	Socorro	LINEAR	·	830 m	MPC · JPL
396832	2004 RS_{154}	—	August 22, 2004	Kitt Peak	Spacewatch	·	2.4 km	MPC · JPL
396833	2004 RG_{155}	—	September 10, 2004	Socorro	LINEAR	NYS	980 m	MPC · JPL
396834	2004 RA_{158}	—	September 10, 2004	Socorro	LINEAR	·	1.2 km	MPC · JPL
396835	2004 RO_{161}	—	September 11, 2004	Kitt Peak	Spacewatch	EOS	1.8 km	MPC · JPL
396836	2004 RS_{163}	—	August 11, 2004	Socorro	LINEAR	·	1.2 km	MPC · JPL
396837	2004 RN_{168}	—	September 8, 2004	Socorro	LINEAR	LIX	3.6 km	MPC · JPL
396838	2004 RG_{183}	—	September 10, 2004	Socorro	LINEAR	·	750 m	MPC · JPL
396839	2004 RV_{186}	—	September 10, 2004	Socorro	LINEAR	·	1.1 km	MPC · JPL
396840	2004 RP_{197}	—	September 10, 2004	Socorro	LINEAR	HYG	3.1 km	MPC · JPL
396841	2004 RV_{198}	—	September 10, 2004	Kitt Peak	Spacewatch	·	5.0 km	MPC · JPL
396842	2004 RE_{205}	—	September 8, 2004	Socorro	LINEAR	·	2.4 km	MPC · JPL
396843	2004 RL_{214}	—	September 11, 2004	Socorro	LINEAR	·	4.4 km	MPC · JPL
396844	2004 RA_{229}	—	September 9, 2004	Kitt Peak	Spacewatch	·	2.7 km	MPC · JPL
396845	2004 RW_{235}	—	September 10, 2004	Socorro	LINEAR	·	850 m	MPC · JPL
396846	2004 RN_{239}	—	September 10, 2004	Kitt Peak	Spacewatch	·	1.1 km	MPC · JPL
396847	2004 RG_{252}	—	September 14, 2004	Socorro	LINEAR	H	650 m	MPC · JPL
396848	2004 RH_{267}	—	September 11, 2004	Kitt Peak	Spacewatch	·	930 m	MPC · JPL
396849	2004 RP_{284}	—	September 15, 2004	Kitt Peak	Spacewatch	·	2.7 km	MPC · JPL
396850	2004 RF_{303}	—	September 12, 2004	Kitt Peak	Spacewatch	VER	2.6 km	MPC · JPL
396851	2004 RO_{336}	—	September 15, 2004	Kitt Peak	Spacewatch	·	920 m	MPC · JPL
396852	2004 RO_{339}	—	September 15, 2004	Socorro	LINEAR	H	610 m	MPC · JPL
396853	2004 SG	—	September 16, 2004	Socorro	LINEAR	·	1.0 km	MPC · JPL
396854	2004 SR_{9}	—	September 18, 2004	Moletai	K. Černis, Zdanavicius, J.	·	2.7 km	MPC · JPL
396855	2004 SW_{15}	—	September 8, 2004	Socorro	LINEAR	·	680 m	MPC · JPL
396856	2004 SM_{22}	—	September 17, 2004	Socorro	LINEAR	·	4.2 km	MPC · JPL
396857	2004 SM_{56}	—	September 16, 2004	Anderson Mesa	LONEOS	TIR	2.3 km	MPC · JPL
396858	2004 TC_{1}	—	October 5, 2004	Three Buttes	Buttes, Three	·	790 m	MPC · JPL
396859	2004 TG_{5}	—	October 4, 2004	Kitt Peak	Spacewatch	·	2.4 km	MPC · JPL
396860	2004 TH_{11}	—	October 8, 2004	Socorro	LINEAR	H	760 m	MPC · JPL
396861	2004 TT_{16}	—	October 7, 2004	Palomar	NEAT	PHO	1.1 km	MPC · JPL
396862	2004 TG_{17}	—	October 9, 2004	Anderson Mesa	LONEOS	·	2.1 km	MPC · JPL
396863	2004 TR_{20}	—	October 7, 2004	Kitt Peak	Spacewatch	·	1.1 km	MPC · JPL
396864	2004 TO_{25}	—	October 4, 2004	Kitt Peak	Spacewatch	·	3.9 km	MPC · JPL
396865	2004 TU_{31}	—	October 4, 2004	Kitt Peak	Spacewatch	·	1.1 km	MPC · JPL
396866	2004 TN_{32}	—	October 4, 2004	Kitt Peak	Spacewatch	·	2.7 km	MPC · JPL
396867	2004 TM_{36}	—	September 15, 2004	Kitt Peak	Spacewatch	·	1.1 km	MPC · JPL
396868	2004 TA_{44}	—	October 4, 2004	Kitt Peak	Spacewatch	NYS	890 m	MPC · JPL
396869	2004 TX_{45}	—	October 4, 2004	Kitt Peak	Spacewatch	V	660 m	MPC · JPL
396870	2004 TL_{61}	—	October 5, 2004	Anderson Mesa	LONEOS	·	1.3 km	MPC · JPL
396871	2004 TQ_{61}	—	October 5, 2004	Anderson Mesa	LONEOS	·	3.5 km	MPC · JPL
396872	2004 TT_{67}	—	October 5, 2004	Anderson Mesa	LONEOS	·	810 m	MPC · JPL
396873	2004 TK_{78}	—	October 4, 2004	Socorro	LINEAR	TIR	3.8 km	MPC · JPL
396874	2004 TZ_{98}	—	September 17, 2004	Kitt Peak	Spacewatch	·	1.0 km	MPC · JPL
396875	2004 TM_{108}	—	September 17, 2004	Anderson Mesa	LONEOS	·	1.4 km	MPC · JPL
396876	2004 TD_{118}	—	October 5, 2004	Anderson Mesa	LONEOS	·	1.4 km	MPC · JPL
396877	2004 TD_{119}	—	October 6, 2004	Socorro	LINEAR	·	1.3 km	MPC · JPL
396878	2004 TE_{143}	—	October 4, 2004	Kitt Peak	Spacewatch	·	1.2 km	MPC · JPL
396879	2004 TP_{146}	—	September 18, 2004	Socorro	LINEAR	·	950 m	MPC · JPL
396880	2004 TY_{154}	—	October 6, 2004	Kitt Peak	Spacewatch	THM	2.3 km	MPC · JPL
396881	2004 TW_{158}	—	February 12, 2002	Kitt Peak	Spacewatch	·	1.2 km	MPC · JPL
396882	2004 TR_{192}	—	October 7, 2004	Kitt Peak	Spacewatch	·	1.5 km	MPC · JPL
396883	2004 TN_{262}	—	August 27, 2004	Anderson Mesa	LONEOS	·	3.0 km	MPC · JPL
396884	2004 TW_{264}	—	October 9, 2004	Kitt Peak	Spacewatch	V	830 m	MPC · JPL
396885	2004 TL_{276}	—	October 9, 2004	Kitt Peak	Spacewatch	·	950 m	MPC · JPL
396886	2004 TR_{307}	—	October 10, 2004	Socorro	LINEAR	·	5.3 km	MPC · JPL
396887	2004 TV_{310}	—	October 10, 2004	Socorro	LINEAR	·	2.2 km	MPC · JPL
396888	2004 VZ_{17}	—	November 4, 2004	Catalina	CSS	·	4.1 km	MPC · JPL
396889	2004 VK_{41}	—	October 23, 2004	Kitt Peak	Spacewatch	·	4.1 km	MPC · JPL
396890	2004 VT_{63}	—	November 10, 2004	Kitt Peak	Spacewatch	T_{j} (2.97) · EUP	4.6 km	MPC · JPL
396891	2004 VF_{79}	—	November 3, 2004	Kitt Peak	Spacewatch	H	530 m	MPC · JPL
396892	2004 WR_{8}	—	November 19, 2004	Socorro	LINEAR	H	760 m	MPC · JPL
396893	2004 XL_{16}	—	December 10, 2004	Kitt Peak	Spacewatch	H	590 m	MPC · JPL
396894	2004 XQ_{30}	—	December 7, 2004	Socorro	LINEAR	H	560 m	MPC · JPL
396895	2004 XJ_{33}	—	December 10, 2004	Socorro	LINEAR	·	1.5 km	MPC · JPL
396896	2004 XO_{56}	—	December 10, 2004	Kitt Peak	Spacewatch	·	1.2 km	MPC · JPL
396897	2004 XJ_{77}	—	December 10, 2004	Vail-Jarnac	Jarnac	EOS	3.3 km	MPC · JPL
396898	2004 XK_{82}	—	December 11, 2004	Socorro	LINEAR	·	1.4 km	MPC · JPL
396899	2004 XV_{91}	—	December 11, 2004	Kitt Peak	Spacewatch	·	790 m	MPC · JPL
396900	2004 XH_{159}	—	December 14, 2004	Kitt Peak	Spacewatch	·	1.0 km	MPC · JPL

== 396901–397000 ==
back to top

Designation			Discovery			Properties		Ref
Permanent	Provisional	Named after	Date	Site	Discoverer(s)	Category	Diam.	Ref
396901	2004 XV_{161}	—	December 15, 2004	Socorro	LINEAR	T_{j} (2.99)	4.8 km	MPC · JPL
396902	2004 YE_{10}	—	November 9, 2004	Catalina	CSS	·	1.4 km	MPC · JPL
396903	2004 YD_{21}	—	December 18, 2004	Mount Lemmon	Mount Lemmon Survey	·	1.1 km	MPC · JPL
396904	2004 YR_{21}	—	December 18, 2004	Mount Lemmon	Mount Lemmon Survey	·	1.3 km	MPC · JPL
396905	2005 AG_{27}	—	December 15, 2004	Campo Imperatore	CINEOS	PHO	980 m	MPC · JPL
396906	2005 AT_{49}	—	January 13, 2005	Socorro	LINEAR	(5)	1.3 km	MPC · JPL
396907	2005 AJ_{51}	—	January 13, 2005	Catalina	CSS	·	1.1 km	MPC · JPL
396908	2005 AO_{82}	—	January 7, 2005	Kitt Peak	Spacewatch	(5)	1.1 km	MPC · JPL
396909	2005 BO_{10}	—	January 16, 2005	Kitt Peak	Spacewatch	·	930 m	MPC · JPL
396910	2005 BV_{13}	—	January 17, 2005	Kitt Peak	Spacewatch	·	1.6 km	MPC · JPL
396911	2005 BH_{20}	—	December 20, 2004	Mount Lemmon	Mount Lemmon Survey	·	1.0 km	MPC · JPL
396912	2005 CX_{41}	—	February 2, 2005	Kitt Peak	Spacewatch	·	1.2 km	MPC · JPL
396913	2005 ED_{36}	—	March 4, 2005	Catalina	CSS	·	2.1 km	MPC · JPL
396914	2005 EG_{43}	—	March 3, 2005	Kitt Peak	Spacewatch	·	1.6 km	MPC · JPL
396915	2005 EK_{60}	—	March 4, 2005	Catalina	CSS	·	1.7 km	MPC · JPL
396916	2005 ES_{64}	—	March 4, 2005	Mount Lemmon	Mount Lemmon Survey	(5)	1.3 km	MPC · JPL
396917	2005 EA_{81}	—	March 4, 2005	Kitt Peak	Spacewatch	·	1.4 km	MPC · JPL
396918	2005 EF_{95}	—	March 9, 2005	Socorro	LINEAR	·	1.3 km	MPC · JPL
396919	2005 EJ_{108}	—	March 4, 2005	Catalina	CSS	·	2.3 km	MPC · JPL
396920	2005 EZ_{118}	—	March 7, 2005	Socorro	LINEAR	JUN	1.3 km	MPC · JPL
396921	2005 EG_{141}	—	March 10, 2005	Catalina	CSS	·	2.2 km	MPC · JPL
396922	2005 EG_{157}	—	March 9, 2005	Mount Lemmon	Mount Lemmon Survey	EUN	1.2 km	MPC · JPL
396923	2005 EU_{196}	—	March 11, 2005	Anderson Mesa	LONEOS	·	1.6 km	MPC · JPL
396924	2005 ED_{245}	—	March 11, 2005	Kitt Peak	Spacewatch	·	1.7 km	MPC · JPL
396925	2005 EY_{256}	—	March 11, 2005	Mount Lemmon	Mount Lemmon Survey	·	1.3 km	MPC · JPL
396926	2005 EE_{269}	—	March 15, 2005	Catalina	CSS	·	1.6 km	MPC · JPL
396927	2005 EH_{283}	—	March 11, 2005	Catalina	CSS	·	1.5 km	MPC · JPL
396928	2005 EE_{311}	—	March 10, 2005	Mount Lemmon	Mount Lemmon Survey	EUN	1.1 km	MPC · JPL
396929	2005 FQ_{7}	—	March 30, 2005	Catalina	CSS	JUN	1.1 km	MPC · JPL
396930	2005 GW_{29}	—	April 4, 2005	Catalina	CSS	EUN	1.5 km	MPC · JPL
396931 Nerliluca	2005 GX_{33}	Nerliluca	April 4, 2005	San Marcello	L. Tesi, Fagioli, G.	MIS	2.6 km	MPC · JPL
396932	2005 GM_{65}	—	April 2, 2005	Mount Lemmon	Mount Lemmon Survey	·	2.0 km	MPC · JPL
396933	2005 GU_{95}	—	April 6, 2005	Kitt Peak	Spacewatch	·	1.8 km	MPC · JPL
396934	2005 GK_{124}	—	April 9, 2005	Mount Lemmon	Mount Lemmon Survey	·	1.6 km	MPC · JPL
396935	2005 GN_{128}	—	April 13, 2005	Mayhill	Lowe, A.	JUN	1.2 km	MPC · JPL
396936	2005 GB_{139}	—	April 12, 2005	Socorro	LINEAR	·	1.6 km	MPC · JPL
396937	2005 GN_{167}	—	April 11, 2005	Mount Lemmon	Mount Lemmon Survey	PAD	1.7 km	MPC · JPL
396938	2005 GE_{172}	—	April 14, 2005	Kitt Peak	Spacewatch	·	1.5 km	MPC · JPL
396939	2005 JW_{23}	—	May 3, 2005	Kitt Peak	Spacewatch	·	1.2 km	MPC · JPL
396940	2005 JB_{25}	—	May 3, 2005	Kitt Peak	Spacewatch	·	2.3 km	MPC · JPL
396941	2005 JF_{25}	—	May 3, 2005	Kitt Peak	Spacewatch	MRX	920 m	MPC · JPL
396942	2005 JQ_{67}	—	May 4, 2005	Palomar	NEAT	·	2.0 km	MPC · JPL
396943	2005 JD_{73}	—	May 8, 2005	Kitt Peak	Spacewatch	·	1.6 km	MPC · JPL
396944	2005 JF_{86}	—	May 8, 2005	Mount Lemmon	Mount Lemmon Survey	·	1.9 km	MPC · JPL
396945	2005 JS_{90}	—	May 11, 2005	Mount Lemmon	Mount Lemmon Survey	DOR	2.0 km	MPC · JPL
396946	2005 JF_{118}	—	May 10, 2005	Kitt Peak	Spacewatch	·	2.2 km	MPC · JPL
396947	2005 JK_{145}	—	May 15, 2005	Mount Lemmon	Mount Lemmon Survey	·	2.2 km	MPC · JPL
396948	2005 JQ_{176}	—	May 9, 2005	Kitt Peak	Spacewatch	·	980 m	MPC · JPL
396949	2005 JN_{178}	—	May 11, 2005	Mount Lemmon	Mount Lemmon Survey	·	1.3 km	MPC · JPL
396950	2005 JC_{185}	—	May 13, 2005	Kitt Peak	Spacewatch	·	2.4 km	MPC · JPL
396951	2005 LA_{26}	—	June 8, 2005	Kitt Peak	Spacewatch	·	2.1 km	MPC · JPL
396952	2005 LC_{26}	—	June 8, 2005	Kitt Peak	Spacewatch	·	2.1 km	MPC · JPL
396953	2005 LX_{27}	—	April 30, 2005	Kitt Peak	Spacewatch	·	2.0 km	MPC · JPL
396954	2005 LO_{29}	—	June 10, 2005	Kitt Peak	Spacewatch	·	1.2 km	MPC · JPL
396955	2005 LV_{29}	—	June 11, 2005	Kitt Peak	Spacewatch	·	2.5 km	MPC · JPL
396956	2005 NT_{9}	—	July 1, 2005	Kitt Peak	Spacewatch	·	2.1 km	MPC · JPL
396957	2005 QQ	—	August 22, 2005	Palomar	NEAT	·	710 m	MPC · JPL
396958	2005 QA_{24}	—	August 27, 2005	Kitt Peak	Spacewatch	·	1.5 km	MPC · JPL
396959	2005 QW_{24}	—	August 27, 2005	Kitt Peak	Spacewatch	·	640 m	MPC · JPL
396960	2005 QG_{89}	—	August 29, 2005	Anderson Mesa	LONEOS	·	2.5 km	MPC · JPL
396961	2005 QF_{111}	—	August 27, 2005	Palomar	NEAT	·	2.7 km	MPC · JPL
396962	2005 QJ_{136}	—	August 28, 2005	Kitt Peak	Spacewatch	·	1.8 km	MPC · JPL
396963	2005 QO_{157}	—	August 31, 2005	Kitt Peak	Spacewatch	·	810 m	MPC · JPL
396964	2005 QJ_{159}	—	August 28, 2005	Anderson Mesa	LONEOS	·	880 m	MPC · JPL
396965	2005 RV_{31}	—	August 30, 2005	Kitt Peak	Spacewatch	·	1.4 km	MPC · JPL
396966	2005 RX_{46}	—	September 14, 2005	Apache Point	A. C. Becker	·	3.0 km	MPC · JPL
396967	2005 RZ_{51}	—	July 10, 2005	Catalina	CSS	·	740 m	MPC · JPL
396968	2005 SB_{20}	—	September 23, 2005	Kitt Peak	Spacewatch	·	790 m	MPC · JPL
396969	2005 SB_{34}	—	September 23, 2005	Kitt Peak	Spacewatch	·	3.0 km	MPC · JPL
396970	2005 SE_{54}	—	September 25, 2005	Kitt Peak	Spacewatch	·	820 m	MPC · JPL
396971	2005 SM_{54}	—	September 25, 2005	Kitt Peak	Spacewatch	·	2.8 km	MPC · JPL
396972	2005 SC_{55}	—	September 25, 2005	Kitt Peak	Spacewatch	·	5.5 km	MPC · JPL
396973	2005 SF_{59}	—	September 26, 2005	Kitt Peak	Spacewatch	·	2.0 km	MPC · JPL
396974	2005 ST_{77}	—	September 24, 2005	Kitt Peak	Spacewatch	·	2.0 km	MPC · JPL
396975	2005 SB_{89}	—	September 24, 2005	Kitt Peak	Spacewatch	·	700 m	MPC · JPL
396976	2005 SX_{97}	—	September 25, 2005	Kitt Peak	Spacewatch	·	2.9 km	MPC · JPL
396977	2005 SK_{100}	—	September 25, 2005	Kitt Peak	Spacewatch	·	3.1 km	MPC · JPL
396978	2005 SV_{103}	—	September 25, 2005	Palomar	NEAT	EOS	2.8 km	MPC · JPL
396979	2005 SF_{111}	—	September 26, 2005	Kitt Peak	Spacewatch	·	1.9 km	MPC · JPL
396980	2005 SC_{113}	—	September 26, 2005	Palomar	NEAT	·	2.6 km	MPC · JPL
396981	2005 SG_{119}	—	September 28, 2005	Palomar	NEAT	·	2.4 km	MPC · JPL
396982	2005 SR_{129}	—	September 29, 2005	Mount Lemmon	Mount Lemmon Survey	·	2.8 km	MPC · JPL
396983	2005 SK_{130}	—	September 29, 2005	Anderson Mesa	LONEOS	THM	2.3 km	MPC · JPL
396984	2005 SX_{130}	—	September 29, 2005	Mount Lemmon	Mount Lemmon Survey	·	460 m	MPC · JPL
396985	2005 SX_{135}	—	September 24, 2005	Kitt Peak	Spacewatch	·	1.6 km	MPC · JPL
396986	2005 SF_{149}	—	September 25, 2005	Kitt Peak	Spacewatch	·	2.2 km	MPC · JPL
396987	2005 SZ_{149}	—	September 25, 2005	Kitt Peak	Spacewatch	EOS	2.0 km	MPC · JPL
396988	2005 SG_{156}	—	September 26, 2005	Kitt Peak	Spacewatch	·	2.5 km	MPC · JPL
396989	2005 SB_{173}	—	September 29, 2005	Kitt Peak	Spacewatch	EOS	1.6 km	MPC · JPL
396990	2005 SK_{177}	—	September 29, 2005	Kitt Peak	Spacewatch	·	1.9 km	MPC · JPL
396991	2005 SB_{181}	—	September 29, 2005	Kitt Peak	Spacewatch	·	1.8 km	MPC · JPL
396992	2005 SO_{183}	—	September 29, 2005	Kitt Peak	Spacewatch	EOS	2.1 km	MPC · JPL
396993	2005 SG_{194}	—	September 29, 2005	Kitt Peak	Spacewatch	·	2.4 km	MPC · JPL
396994	2005 ST_{212}	—	September 24, 2005	Kitt Peak	Spacewatch	EOS	2.1 km	MPC · JPL
396995	2005 SL_{213}	—	September 30, 2005	Kitt Peak	Spacewatch	EOS	1.7 km	MPC · JPL
396996	2005 SP_{215}	—	September 30, 2005	Anderson Mesa	LONEOS	·	2.0 km	MPC · JPL
396997	2005 SQ_{226}	—	September 30, 2005	Kitt Peak	Spacewatch	·	590 m	MPC · JPL
396998	2005 SZ_{236}	—	September 29, 2005	Kitt Peak	Spacewatch	·	2.3 km	MPC · JPL
396999	2005 SK_{280}	—	September 25, 2005	Kitt Peak	Spacewatch	·	3.4 km	MPC · JPL
397000	2005 SC_{283}	—	September 21, 2005	Apache Point	A. C. Becker	·	2.3 km	MPC · JPL

back to top

== See also ==
- Meanings of minor-planet names: 396001–397000
