= List of minor planets: 773001–774000 =

The following is a partial list of minor planets, running from minor-planet number 773001 through 774000, inclusive. The primary data for this and other partial lists is based on JPL's "Small-Body Orbital Elements" and data available from the Minor Planet Center. Critical list information is also provided by the MPC, unless otherwise specified from Lowell Observatory. A detailed description of the table's columns and additional sources are given on the main page including a complete list of every page in this series, and a statistical break-up on the dynamical classification of minor planets.

Also see the summary list of all named bodies in numerical and alphabetical order, and the corresponding naming citations for the number range of this particular list. New namings may only be added to this list after official publication, as the preannouncement of names is condemned by the Working Group for Small Bodies Nomenclature of the International Astronomical Union.

Near-Earth obj.	MBA (inner)	MBA (outer)	Centaur
Mars-crosser	MBA (middle)	Jupiter trojan	Trans-Neptunian obj.
Unclassified

== 773001–773100 ==
Designation			Discovery			Properties		Ref
Permanent	Provisional	Named after	Date	Site	Discoverer(s)	Category	Diam.	Ref
773001	2018 PR_{46}	—	August 7, 2018	Haleakala	Pan-STARRS 1	BRA	1.2 km	MPC · JPL
773002	2018 PB_{48}	—	August 13, 2018	Haleakala	Pan-STARRS 1	EOS	1.6 km	MPC · JPL
773003	2018 PJ_{48}	—	August 7, 2018	Haleakala	Pan-STARRS 1	·	2.0 km	MPC · JPL
773004	2018 PJ_{50}	—	August 13, 2018	Haleakala	Pan-STARRS 1	·	2.5 km	MPC · JPL
773005	2018 PG_{51}	—	August 5, 2018	Haleakala	Pan-STARRS 1	·	1.4 km	MPC · JPL
773006	2018 PF_{52}	—	August 5, 2018	Haleakala	Pan-STARRS 1	·	1.4 km	MPC · JPL
773007	2018 PE_{56}	—	August 14, 2018	Haleakala	Pan-STARRS 1	EOS	1.2 km	MPC · JPL
773008	2018 PJ_{56}	—	August 13, 2018	Haleakala	Pan-STARRS 1	KON	1.7 km	MPC · JPL
773009	2018 PA_{58}	—	August 14, 2018	Haleakala	Pan-STARRS 1	EOS	1.5 km	MPC · JPL
773010	2018 PQ_{58}	—	August 11, 2018	Haleakala	Pan-STARRS 1	·	2.1 km	MPC · JPL
773011	2018 PC_{59}	—	November 3, 2008	Mount Lemmon	Mount Lemmon Survey	EOS	1.5 km	MPC · JPL
773012	2018 PM_{59}	—	August 8, 2018	Haleakala	Pan-STARRS 1	EOS	1.2 km	MPC · JPL
773013	2018 PD_{60}	—	August 5, 2018	Haleakala	Pan-STARRS 1	·	1.4 km	MPC · JPL
773014	2018 PQ_{60}	—	January 18, 2016	Haleakala	Pan-STARRS 1	·	1.8 km	MPC · JPL
773015	2018 PR_{60}	—	October 5, 2013	Haleakala	Pan-STARRS 1	·	1.8 km	MPC · JPL
773016	2018 PZ_{61}	—	October 1, 2013	Mount Lemmon	Mount Lemmon Survey	·	2.4 km	MPC · JPL
773017	2018 PH_{62}	—	August 5, 2018	Haleakala	Pan-STARRS 1	·	2.4 km	MPC · JPL
773018	2018 PQ_{62}	—	April 30, 2016	Haleakala	Pan-STARRS 1	·	2.1 km	MPC · JPL
773019	2018 PW_{62}	—	August 7, 2018	Haleakala	Pan-STARRS 1	·	2.0 km	MPC · JPL
773020	2018 PO_{67}	—	August 7, 2018	Haleakala	Pan-STARRS 1	EOS	1.3 km	MPC · JPL
773021	2018 PK_{69}	—	March 4, 2016	Haleakala	Pan-STARRS 1	EOS	1.4 km	MPC · JPL
773022	2018 PM_{69}	—	August 13, 2018	Haleakala	Pan-STARRS 1	·	2.0 km	MPC · JPL
773023	2018 PT_{70}	—	March 28, 2016	Cerro Tololo	DECam	·	2.4 km	MPC · JPL
773024	2018 PN_{74}	—	March 3, 2016	Haleakala	Pan-STARRS 1	EOS	1.3 km	MPC · JPL
773025	2018 PM_{76}	—	October 2, 2013	Mount Lemmon	Mount Lemmon Survey	EOS	1.3 km	MPC · JPL
773026	2018 PQ_{78}	—	August 8, 2018	Haleakala	Pan-STARRS 1	·	2.3 km	MPC · JPL
773027	2018 PW_{78}	—	August 7, 2018	Haleakala	Pan-STARRS 1	EOS	1.4 km	MPC · JPL
773028	2018 PY_{78}	—	May 22, 2017	Kitt Peak	Spacewatch	·	2.1 km	MPC · JPL
773029	2018 PZ_{78}	—	March 30, 2011	Mount Lemmon	Mount Lemmon Survey	·	1.9 km	MPC · JPL
773030	2018 PJ_{82}	—	September 29, 2014	Haleakala	Pan-STARRS 1	·	1.3 km	MPC · JPL
773031	2018 PD_{117}	—	August 13, 2018	Haleakala	Pan-STARRS 1	EOS	1.4 km	MPC · JPL
773032	2018 PU_{154}	—	September 2, 2013	Mount Lemmon	Mount Lemmon Survey	·	2.0 km	MPC · JPL
773033	2018 PW_{159}	—	January 20, 2015	Haleakala	Pan-STARRS 1	·	2.2 km	MPC · JPL
773034	2018 QA_{5}	—	November 26, 2013	Tincana	Osservatorio, Rantiga	·	3.1 km	MPC · JPL
773035	2018 QL_{6}	—	September 28, 2008	Mount Lemmon	Mount Lemmon Survey	·	1.9 km	MPC · JPL
773036	2018 QP_{6}	—	October 26, 2014	Mount Lemmon	Mount Lemmon Survey	·	2.0 km	MPC · JPL
773037	2018 QY_{10}	—	October 31, 2007	Kitt Peak	Spacewatch	·	2.1 km	MPC · JPL
773038	2018 QM_{11}	—	August 22, 2018	Haleakala	Pan-STARRS 1	·	2.4 km	MPC · JPL
773039	2018 QO_{11}	—	August 19, 2018	Haleakala	Pan-STARRS 1	LUT	2.7 km	MPC · JPL
773040	2018 QR_{11}	—	August 18, 2018	Haleakala	Pan-STARRS 1	EOS	1.6 km	MPC · JPL
773041	2018 QZ_{11}	—	August 19, 2018	Haleakala	Pan-STARRS 1	·	2.1 km	MPC · JPL
773042	2018 QA_{12}	—	March 28, 2016	Cerro Tololo	DECam	·	2.0 km	MPC · JPL
773043	2018 QD_{12}	—	August 19, 2018	Haleakala	Pan-STARRS 1	·	2.4 km	MPC · JPL
773044	2018 QG_{13}	—	January 16, 2009	Mount Lemmon	Mount Lemmon Survey	·	1.8 km	MPC · JPL
773045	2018 QH_{13}	—	August 22, 2018	Haleakala	Pan-STARRS 1	·	1.8 km	MPC · JPL
773046	2018 QN_{14}	—	August 18, 2018	Haleakala	Pan-STARRS 1	·	2.9 km	MPC · JPL
773047	2018 QO_{15}	—	December 25, 2009	Kitt Peak	Spacewatch	·	1.3 km	MPC · JPL
773048	2018 QA_{17}	—	August 18, 2018	Haleakala	Pan-STARRS 1	·	1.6 km	MPC · JPL
773049	2018 QB_{18}	—	August 18, 2018	Haleakala	Pan-STARRS 1	KOR	1.2 km	MPC · JPL
773050	2018 QL_{18}	—	August 22, 2018	Haleakala	Pan-STARRS 1	·	2.1 km	MPC · JPL
773051	2018 QT_{19}	—	August 18, 2018	Haleakala	Pan-STARRS 1	·	1.8 km	MPC · JPL
773052	2018 QC_{20}	—	August 21, 2018	Haleakala	Pan-STARRS 1	·	2.3 km	MPC · JPL
773053	2018 QD_{20}	—	August 17, 2018	Haleakala	Pan-STARRS 1	·	2.0 km	MPC · JPL
773054	2018 QC_{21}	—	August 18, 2018	Haleakala	Pan-STARRS 1	·	2.1 km	MPC · JPL
773055	2018 QK_{25}	—	August 19, 2018	Haleakala	Pan-STARRS 1	·	1.7 km	MPC · JPL
773056	2018 RS_{11}	—	November 2, 2013	Kitt Peak	Spacewatch	·	2.6 km	MPC · JPL
773057	2018 RU_{22}	—	February 26, 2015	Mount Lemmon	Mount Lemmon Survey	T_{j} (2.97)	3.2 km	MPC · JPL
773058	2018 RQ_{31}	—	September 14, 2007	Catalina	CSS	·	2.6 km	MPC · JPL
773059	2018 RD_{33}	—	November 2, 2013	Catalina	CSS	·	2.1 km	MPC · JPL
773060	2018 RC_{37}	—	February 1, 2009	Kitt Peak	Spacewatch	·	1.9 km	MPC · JPL
773061	2018 RN_{39}	—	September 11, 2018	Mount Lemmon	Mount Lemmon Survey	TIR	2.1 km	MPC · JPL
773062	2018 RX_{40}	—	April 18, 2015	Cerro Tololo	DECam	·	1.8 km	MPC · JPL
773063	2018 RV_{41}	—	September 7, 2012	Les Engarouines	L. Bernasconi	THB	2.5 km	MPC · JPL
773064	2018 RQ_{44}	—	September 13, 2018	Mount Lemmon	Mount Lemmon Survey	·	1.9 km	MPC · JPL
773065	2018 RR_{48}	—	January 31, 2004	Apache Point	SDSS	·	2.1 km	MPC · JPL
773066	2018 RV_{48}	—	September 13, 2018	Mount Lemmon	Mount Lemmon Survey	TIR	2.0 km	MPC · JPL
773067	2018 RF_{49}	—	September 7, 2018	Mount Lemmon	Mount Lemmon Survey	·	2.3 km	MPC · JPL
773068	2018 RP_{49}	—	September 14, 2018	Mount Lemmon	Mount Lemmon Survey	·	2.6 km	MPC · JPL
773069	2018 RS_{49}	—	September 14, 2018	Mount Lemmon	Mount Lemmon Survey	EOS	1.4 km	MPC · JPL
773070	2018 RD_{50}	—	September 7, 2018	Mount Lemmon	Mount Lemmon Survey	·	2.0 km	MPC · JPL
773071	2018 RE_{51}	—	May 1, 2016	Cerro Tololo	DECam	TIR	2.0 km	MPC · JPL
773072	2018 RA_{52}	—	September 15, 2018	Kitt Peak	Spacewatch	·	1.6 km	MPC · JPL
773073	2018 RP_{53}	—	September 14, 2018	Mount Lemmon	Mount Lemmon Survey	·	1.9 km	MPC · JPL
773074	2018 RU_{53}	—	September 9, 2018	Mount Lemmon	Mount Lemmon Survey	·	2.8 km	MPC · JPL
773075	2018 RV_{53}	—	January 26, 2015	Haleakala	Pan-STARRS 1	·	3.0 km	MPC · JPL
773076	2018 RL_{54}	—	September 11, 2018	Mount Lemmon	Mount Lemmon Survey	EOS	1.5 km	MPC · JPL
773077	2018 RD_{56}	—	September 14, 2013	Haleakala	Pan-STARRS 1	·	2.2 km	MPC · JPL
773078	2018 RK_{56}	—	December 22, 2008	Mount Lemmon	Mount Lemmon Survey	·	2.7 km	MPC · JPL
773079	2018 RY_{56}	—	September 11, 2018	Mount Lemmon	Mount Lemmon Survey	·	1.6 km	MPC · JPL
773080	2018 RV_{58}	—	October 21, 2007	Kitt Peak	Spacewatch	·	2.2 km	MPC · JPL
773081	2018 RO_{59}	—	September 12, 2018	Mount Lemmon	Mount Lemmon Survey	·	2.4 km	MPC · JPL
773082	2018 RY_{59}	—	September 12, 2018	Mount Lemmon	Mount Lemmon Survey	KOR	1.2 km	MPC · JPL
773083	2018 RQ_{60}	—	September 13, 2018	Mount Lemmon	Mount Lemmon Survey	EOS	1.4 km	MPC · JPL
773084	2018 RK_{63}	—	December 6, 2008	Kitt Peak	Spacewatch	EOS	1.6 km	MPC · JPL
773085	2018 RW_{64}	—	September 9, 2018	Mount Lemmon	Mount Lemmon Survey	·	2.4 km	MPC · JPL
773086	2018 RX_{64}	—	September 15, 2018	Mount Lemmon	Mount Lemmon Survey	·	2.4 km	MPC · JPL
773087	2018 RG_{65}	—	January 17, 2015	Haleakala	Pan-STARRS 1	(43176)	2.0 km	MPC · JPL
773088	2018 RY_{66}	—	December 21, 2014	Haleakala	Pan-STARRS 1	EOS	1.5 km	MPC · JPL
773089	2018 RG_{68}	—	September 10, 2018	Mount Lemmon	Mount Lemmon Survey	·	1.3 km	MPC · JPL
773090	2018 RK_{76}	—	September 7, 2018	Mount Lemmon	Mount Lemmon Survey	EOS	1.4 km	MPC · JPL
773091	2018 RV_{76}	—	November 1, 2007	Mount Lemmon	Mount Lemmon Survey	·	2.2 km	MPC · JPL
773092	2018 RK_{100}	—	November 10, 2013	Mount Lemmon	Mount Lemmon Survey	·	2.3 km	MPC · JPL
773093	2018 RN_{125}	—	November 9, 2013	Haleakala	Pan-STARRS 1	·	2.2 km	MPC · JPL
773094	2018 RC_{131}	—	November 29, 2014	Haleakala	Pan-STARRS 1	·	3.0 km	MPC · JPL
773095	2018 SF	—	January 5, 2014	Haleakala	Pan-STARRS 1	·	2.0 km	MPC · JPL
773096	2018 SW_{3}	—	December 4, 2013	Haleakala	Pan-STARRS 1	H	520 m	MPC · JPL
773097	2018 SE_{4}	—	September 15, 2013	Haleakala	Pan-STARRS 1	·	1.8 km	MPC · JPL
773098	2018 SM_{11}	—	April 2, 2011	Mount Lemmon	Mount Lemmon Survey	·	2.5 km	MPC · JPL
773099	2018 SU_{15}	—	January 17, 2016	Haleakala	Pan-STARRS 1	·	2.7 km	MPC · JPL
773100	2018 SS_{17}	—	September 17, 2018	Mount Lemmon	Mount Lemmon Survey	EUP	2.1 km	MPC · JPL

== 773101–773200 ==
back to top

Designation			Discovery			Properties		Ref
Permanent	Provisional	Named after	Date	Site	Discoverer(s)	Category	Diam.	Ref
773101	2018 SA_{18}	—	September 30, 2018	Mount Lemmon	Mount Lemmon Survey	·	2.4 km	MPC · JPL
773102	2018 SE_{18}	—	September 19, 2018	Haleakala	Pan-STARRS 2	·	2.1 km	MPC · JPL
773103	2018 SP_{19}	—	September 16, 2018	Mount Lemmon	Mount Lemmon Survey	·	2.7 km	MPC · JPL
773104	2018 SU_{19}	—	March 1, 2016	Mount Lemmon	Mount Lemmon Survey	·	1.5 km	MPC · JPL
773105	2018 SF_{20}	—	September 19, 2018	Haleakala	Pan-STARRS 2	·	1.3 km	MPC · JPL
773106	2018 SG_{20}	—	September 19, 2018	Haleakala	Pan-STARRS 2	·	1.9 km	MPC · JPL
773107	2018 SO_{21}	—	September 17, 2018	Mount Lemmon	Mount Lemmon Survey	·	2.6 km	MPC · JPL
773108	2018 SH_{22}	—	September 19, 2018	Haleakala	Pan-STARRS 2	·	2.2 km	MPC · JPL
773109	2018 SG_{24}	—	September 19, 2018	Haleakala	Pan-STARRS 2	EOS	1.2 km	MPC · JPL
773110	2018 TO_{7}	—	April 2, 2011	Kitt Peak	Spacewatch	EOS	1.4 km	MPC · JPL
773111	2018 TF_{9}	—	September 1, 2013	Haleakala	Pan-STARRS 1	GAL	1.8 km	MPC · JPL
773112	2018 TG_{12}	—	August 14, 2012	Haleakala	Pan-STARRS 1	THB	2.2 km	MPC · JPL
773113	2018 TQ_{12}	—	November 27, 2013	Haleakala	Pan-STARRS 1	·	1.5 km	MPC · JPL
773114	2018 TU_{13}	—	August 14, 2012	Haleakala	Pan-STARRS 1	HYG	2.3 km	MPC · JPL
773115	2018 TX_{14}	—	October 15, 2018	Haleakala	Pan-STARRS 2	·	2.6 km	MPC · JPL
773116	2018 TE_{18}	—	October 8, 2007	Mount Lemmon	Mount Lemmon Survey	·	2.0 km	MPC · JPL
773117	2018 TR_{18}	—	October 26, 2013	Mount Lemmon	Mount Lemmon Survey	·	1.8 km	MPC · JPL
773118	2018 TX_{21}	—	October 9, 2007	Kitt Peak	Spacewatch	·	2.1 km	MPC · JPL
773119	2018 TQ_{23}	—	October 6, 2018	Mount Lemmon	Mount Lemmon Survey	HYG	1.9 km	MPC · JPL
773120	2018 TT_{25}	—	October 4, 2018	Haleakala	Pan-STARRS 2	·	2.2 km	MPC · JPL
773121	2018 TU_{25}	—	October 5, 2018	Mount Lemmon	Mount Lemmon Survey	·	1.8 km	MPC · JPL
773122	2018 TG_{26}	—	October 6, 2018	Mount Lemmon	Mount Lemmon Survey	EOS	1.3 km	MPC · JPL
773123	2018 TH_{26}	—	October 5, 2018	Haleakala	Pan-STARRS 2	·	1.3 km	MPC · JPL
773124	2018 TR_{26}	—	October 4, 2018	Haleakala	Pan-STARRS 2	·	2.1 km	MPC · JPL
773125	2018 TU_{26}	—	October 10, 2018	Haleakala	Pan-STARRS 2	·	2.3 km	MPC · JPL
773126	2018 TF_{27}	—	April 18, 2015	Cerro Tololo	DECam	TIR	2.5 km	MPC · JPL
773127	2018 TZ_{27}	—	October 6, 2018	Mount Lemmon	Mount Lemmon Survey	EOS	1.2 km	MPC · JPL
773128	2018 TF_{28}	—	October 6, 2018	Mount Lemmon	Mount Lemmon Survey	·	2.3 km	MPC · JPL
773129	2018 TS_{28}	—	May 1, 2016	Cerro Tololo	DECam	·	2.0 km	MPC · JPL
773130	2018 TC_{29}	—	November 27, 2013	Haleakala	Pan-STARRS 1	·	2.2 km	MPC · JPL
773131	2018 TG_{29}	—	October 15, 2018	Haleakala	Pan-STARRS 2	T_{j} (2.98) · EUP	3.0 km	MPC · JPL
773132	2018 TM_{29}	—	October 5, 2018	Haleakala	Pan-STARRS 2	·	1.3 km	MPC · JPL
773133	2018 TM_{31}	—	October 6, 2018	Mount Lemmon	Mount Lemmon Survey	·	1.4 km	MPC · JPL
773134	2018 TN_{33}	—	October 5, 2018	Haleakala	Pan-STARRS 2	·	2.5 km	MPC · JPL
773135	2018 TR_{34}	—	October 4, 2018	Haleakala	Pan-STARRS 2	EOS	1.7 km	MPC · JPL
773136	2018 TE_{35}	—	October 10, 2018	Mount Lemmon	Mount Lemmon Survey	·	2.0 km	MPC · JPL
773137	2018 TM_{35}	—	October 5, 2018	Haleakala	Pan-STARRS 2	·	2.5 km	MPC · JPL
773138	2018 TP_{35}	—	January 20, 2009	Mount Lemmon	Mount Lemmon Survey	·	2.1 km	MPC · JPL
773139	2018 TH_{37}	—	September 14, 2007	Mount Lemmon	Mount Lemmon Survey	VER	2.0 km	MPC · JPL
773140	2018 TE_{38}	—	March 4, 2016	Mount Lemmon	Mount Lemmon Survey	·	1.2 km	MPC · JPL
773141	2018 TX_{40}	—	April 3, 2016	Haleakala	Pan-STARRS 1	VER	1.9 km	MPC · JPL
773142	2018 TL_{41}	—	December 29, 2014	Mount Lemmon	Mount Lemmon Survey	·	1.5 km	MPC · JPL
773143	2018 TO_{41}	—	October 15, 2007	Mount Lemmon	Mount Lemmon Survey	·	2.2 km	MPC · JPL
773144	2018 TK_{44}	—	March 6, 2016	Haleakala	Pan-STARRS 1	·	2.3 km	MPC · JPL
773145	2018 TL_{46}	—	October 10, 2018	Haleakala	Pan-STARRS 2	·	2.3 km	MPC · JPL
773146	2018 TG_{47}	—	October 6, 2018	Mount Lemmon	Mount Lemmon Survey	EOS	1.5 km	MPC · JPL
773147	2018 TB_{48}	—	January 22, 2015	Haleakala	Pan-STARRS 1	·	2.1 km	MPC · JPL
773148	2018 TG_{48}	—	May 8, 2016	Apache Point	SDSS Collaboration	·	1.8 km	MPC · JPL
773149	2018 TO_{48}	—	November 8, 2009	Mount Lemmon	Mount Lemmon Survey	·	1.4 km	MPC · JPL
773150	2018 TX_{48}	—	January 22, 2015	Haleakala	Pan-STARRS 1	·	2.7 km	MPC · JPL
773151	2018 TO_{64}	—	October 5, 2018	Mount Lemmon	Mount Lemmon Survey	(1298)	2.3 km	MPC · JPL
773152	2018 TG_{66}	—	October 5, 2018	Haleakala	Pan-STARRS 2	·	2.3 km	MPC · JPL
773153	2018 TS_{66}	—	November 17, 2008	Kitt Peak	Spacewatch	·	1.5 km	MPC · JPL
773154	2018 TT_{67}	—	January 22, 2015	Haleakala	Pan-STARRS 1	·	1.6 km	MPC · JPL
773155	2018 UK_{6}	—	September 10, 2018	Mount Lemmon	Mount Lemmon Survey	·	1.9 km	MPC · JPL
773156	2018 UM_{6}	—	May 1, 2016	Cerro Tololo	DECam	·	2.1 km	MPC · JPL
773157	2018 UP_{6}	—	September 15, 2007	Mount Lemmon	Mount Lemmon Survey	TIR	2.1 km	MPC · JPL
773158	2018 UJ_{8}	—	October 24, 2007	Mount Lemmon	Mount Lemmon Survey	TIR	2.4 km	MPC · JPL
773159	2018 UA_{13}	—	June 20, 2017	Haleakala	Pan-STARRS 1	·	2.1 km	MPC · JPL
773160	2018 UF_{21}	—	April 6, 2010	Kitt Peak	Spacewatch	VER	2.1 km	MPC · JPL
773161	2018 UT_{21}	—	October 17, 2018	Haleakala	Pan-STARRS 2	EOS	1.5 km	MPC · JPL
773162	2018 UG_{23}	—	November 3, 2007	Mount Lemmon	Mount Lemmon Survey	·	2.1 km	MPC · JPL
773163	2018 UJ_{24}	—	October 4, 2007	Kitt Peak	Spacewatch	HYG	2.1 km	MPC · JPL
773164	2018 UN_{25}	—	September 13, 2007	Kitt Peak	Spacewatch	·	2.1 km	MPC · JPL
773165	2018 UY_{25}	—	October 21, 2018	Mount Lemmon	Mount Lemmon Survey	·	2.1 km	MPC · JPL
773166	2018 UM_{26}	—	October 21, 2018	Mount Lemmon	Mount Lemmon Survey	·	1.7 km	MPC · JPL
773167	2018 UR_{26}	—	October 18, 2018	Mount Lemmon	Mount Lemmon Survey	EOS	1.4 km	MPC · JPL
773168	2018 UV_{26}	—	October 10, 2018	Mount Lemmon	Mount Lemmon Survey	EOS	1.4 km	MPC · JPL
773169	2018 UW_{26}	—	March 5, 2016	Haleakala	Pan-STARRS 1	·	1.8 km	MPC · JPL
773170	2018 UA_{27}	—	April 18, 2015	Cerro Tololo	DECam	·	2.0 km	MPC · JPL
773171	2018 UG_{27}	—	October 18, 2018	Mount Lemmon	Mount Lemmon Survey	·	1.6 km	MPC · JPL
773172	2018 UQ_{27}	—	October 17, 2018	Haleakala	Pan-STARRS 2	·	2.2 km	MPC · JPL
773173	2018 UU_{27}	—	October 21, 2018	Mount Lemmon	Mount Lemmon Survey	·	2.0 km	MPC · JPL
773174	2018 UW_{27}	—	May 21, 2015	Haleakala	Pan-STARRS 1	·	2.2 km	MPC · JPL
773175	2018 UJ_{30}	—	April 19, 2015	Cerro Tololo	DECam	TIR	1.8 km	MPC · JPL
773176	2018 UM_{32}	—	October 12, 2007	Mount Lemmon	Mount Lemmon Survey	EOS	1.3 km	MPC · JPL
773177	2018 US_{33}	—	October 17, 2018	Haleakala	Pan-STARRS 2	·	2.3 km	MPC · JPL
773178	2018 UA_{34}	—	October 18, 2018	Mount Lemmon	Mount Lemmon Survey	·	2.5 km	MPC · JPL
773179	2018 UE_{34}	—	October 16, 2018	Haleakala	Pan-STARRS 2	·	2.2 km	MPC · JPL
773180	2018 UN_{36}	—	October 20, 2018	Mount Lemmon	Mount Lemmon Survey	·	1.4 km	MPC · JPL
773181	2018 UF_{38}	—	October 28, 2018	Mount Lemmon	Mount Lemmon Survey	·	2.8 km	MPC · JPL
773182	2018 UQ_{38}	—	October 21, 2018	Mount Lemmon	Mount Lemmon Survey	HNS	940 m	MPC · JPL
773183	2018 UN_{41}	—	October 17, 2018	Haleakala	Pan-STARRS 2	·	1.9 km	MPC · JPL
773184	2018 VF_{12}	—	November 28, 2013	Mount Lemmon	Mount Lemmon Survey	·	1.7 km	MPC · JPL
773185	2018 VK_{13}	—	August 24, 2012	Kitt Peak	Spacewatch	·	2.4 km	MPC · JPL
773186	2018 VZ_{13}	—	March 10, 2016	Mount Lemmon	Mount Lemmon Survey	·	1.3 km	MPC · JPL
773187	2018 VN_{16}	—	April 26, 2011	Mount Lemmon	Mount Lemmon Survey	·	2.5 km	MPC · JPL
773188	2018 VP_{16}	—	November 25, 2014	Haleakala	Pan-STARRS 1	·	1.3 km	MPC · JPL
773189	2018 VQ_{19}	—	June 7, 2013	Haleakala	Pan-STARRS 1	·	1.2 km	MPC · JPL
773190	2018 VC_{23}	—	December 30, 2013	Kitt Peak	Spacewatch	·	2.3 km	MPC · JPL
773191	2018 VQ_{23}	—	October 8, 2013	Mount Lemmon	Mount Lemmon Survey	·	2.1 km	MPC · JPL
773192	2018 VG_{24}	—	September 21, 2018	Mount Lemmon	Mount Lemmon Survey	TIR	2.2 km	MPC · JPL
773193	2018 VV_{24}	—	October 6, 2012	Haleakala	Pan-STARRS 1	(895)	3.4 km	MPC · JPL
773194	2018 VG_{25}	—	April 18, 2015	Cerro Tololo	DECam	·	2.1 km	MPC · JPL
773195	2018 VU_{26}	—	September 13, 2007	Kitt Peak	Spacewatch	·	1.9 km	MPC · JPL
773196	2018 VJ_{28}	—	September 12, 2018	Mount Lemmon	Mount Lemmon Survey	TIR	2.3 km	MPC · JPL
773197	2018 VD_{32}	—	October 8, 2012	Mount Lemmon	Mount Lemmon Survey	VER	1.9 km	MPC · JPL
773198	2018 VM_{34}	—	September 17, 2012	Mount Lemmon	Mount Lemmon Survey	THM	1.6 km	MPC · JPL
773199	2018 VR_{37}	—	April 18, 2015	Haleakala	Pan-STARRS 1	·	2.4 km	MPC · JPL
773200	2018 VH_{38}	—	January 18, 2015	Mount Lemmon	Mount Lemmon Survey	·	1.8 km	MPC · JPL

== 773201–773300 ==
back to top

Designation			Discovery			Properties		Ref
Permanent	Provisional	Named after	Date	Site	Discoverer(s)	Category	Diam.	Ref
773201	2018 VL_{38}	—	March 10, 2016	Haleakala	Pan-STARRS 1	·	2.4 km	MPC · JPL
773202	2018 VR_{38}	—	October 10, 2012	Mount Lemmon	Mount Lemmon Survey	·	2.3 km	MPC · JPL
773203	2018 VH_{39}	—	October 7, 2007	Kitt Peak	Spacewatch	·	1.8 km	MPC · JPL
773204	2018 VU_{40}	—	November 6, 2008	Kitt Peak	Spacewatch	EOS	1.5 km	MPC · JPL
773205	2018 VC_{42}	—	October 8, 2007	Mount Lemmon	Mount Lemmon Survey	·	2.1 km	MPC · JPL
773206	2018 VA_{44}	—	January 3, 2009	Kitt Peak	Spacewatch	EOS	1.5 km	MPC · JPL
773207	2018 VH_{44}	—	December 3, 2013	Haleakala	Pan-STARRS 1	·	1.8 km	MPC · JPL
773208	2018 VL_{46}	—	November 17, 2007	Kitt Peak	Spacewatch	·	1.8 km	MPC · JPL
773209	2018 VQ_{50}	—	February 13, 2011	Mount Lemmon	Mount Lemmon Survey	AGN	880 m	MPC · JPL
773210	2018 VG_{52}	—	October 31, 2007	Mount Lemmon	Mount Lemmon Survey	·	1.9 km	MPC · JPL
773211	2018 VS_{53}	—	October 16, 2007	Kitt Peak	Spacewatch	·	2.3 km	MPC · JPL
773212	2018 VY_{54}	—	October 20, 2018	Mount Lemmon	Mount Lemmon Survey	·	2.1 km	MPC · JPL
773213	2018 VN_{58}	—	November 26, 2013	Mount Lemmon	Mount Lemmon Survey	EOS	1.7 km	MPC · JPL
773214	2018 VQ_{58}	—	December 10, 2002	Kitt Peak	Spacewatch	·	2.0 km	MPC · JPL
773215	2018 VQ_{59}	—	October 16, 2018	Haleakala	Pan-STARRS 2	·	2.1 km	MPC · JPL
773216	2018 VL_{60}	—	December 26, 2013	Kitt Peak	Spacewatch	·	1.8 km	MPC · JPL
773217	2018 VA_{65}	—	August 25, 2012	Catalina	CSS	·	2.7 km	MPC · JPL
773218	2018 VA_{68}	—	December 22, 2008	Mount Lemmon	Mount Lemmon Survey	·	2.0 km	MPC · JPL
773219	2018 VC_{69}	—	October 16, 2007	Mount Lemmon	Mount Lemmon Survey	TIR	1.9 km	MPC · JPL
773220	2018 VR_{70}	—	January 3, 2009	Mount Lemmon	Mount Lemmon Survey	EMA	2.3 km	MPC · JPL
773221	2018 VV_{70}	—	September 8, 2018	Mount Lemmon	Mount Lemmon Survey	·	2.8 km	MPC · JPL
773222	2018 VT_{72}	—	October 4, 2007	Mount Lemmon	Mount Lemmon Survey	·	1.3 km	MPC · JPL
773223	2018 VP_{73}	—	October 16, 2012	Mount Lemmon	Mount Lemmon Survey	·	2.6 km	MPC · JPL
773224	2018 VX_{73}	—	November 25, 2011	Haleakala	Pan-STARRS 1	·	670 m	MPC · JPL
773225	2018 VH_{74}	—	October 9, 2007	Mount Lemmon	Mount Lemmon Survey	·	2.1 km	MPC · JPL
773226	2018 VE_{75}	—	September 24, 2012	Mount Lemmon	Mount Lemmon Survey	·	1.7 km	MPC · JPL
773227	2018 VK_{75}	—	February 19, 2015	Haleakala	Pan-STARRS 1	·	2.0 km	MPC · JPL
773228	2018 VE_{78}	—	December 25, 2013	Haleakala	Pan-STARRS 1	·	2.0 km	MPC · JPL
773229	2018 VK_{78}	—	October 9, 2013	Mount Lemmon	Mount Lemmon Survey	EOS	1.5 km	MPC · JPL
773230	2018 VN_{83}	—	September 15, 2007	Catalina	CSS	·	2.2 km	MPC · JPL
773231	2018 VF_{86}	—	December 27, 2013	Mount Lemmon	Mount Lemmon Survey	·	2.0 km	MPC · JPL
773232	2018 VB_{88}	—	October 20, 2018	Mount Lemmon	Mount Lemmon Survey	·	2.1 km	MPC · JPL
773233	2018 VL_{89}	—	March 14, 2015	Haleakala	Pan-STARRS 1	·	1.2 km	MPC · JPL
773234	2018 VE_{92}	—	October 30, 2007	Kitt Peak	Spacewatch	·	2.4 km	MPC · JPL
773235	2018 VW_{92}	—	December 13, 2013	Mount Lemmon	Mount Lemmon Survey	EMA	2.3 km	MPC · JPL
773236	2018 VB_{93}	—	November 1, 2007	Mount Lemmon	Mount Lemmon Survey	EOS	1.3 km	MPC · JPL
773237	2018 VZ_{95}	—	May 11, 2015	Mount Lemmon	Mount Lemmon Survey	·	2.2 km	MPC · JPL
773238	2018 VR_{98}	—	September 20, 2001	Kitt Peak	Spacewatch	THM	1.7 km	MPC · JPL
773239	2018 VA_{99}	—	May 1, 2016	Cerro Tololo	DECam	EOS	1.3 km	MPC · JPL
773240	2018 VF_{105}	—	October 30, 2007	Mount Lemmon	Mount Lemmon Survey	·	2.2 km	MPC · JPL
773241	2018 VW_{108}	—	December 6, 2013	Haleakala	Pan-STARRS 1	·	2.6 km	MPC · JPL
773242	2018 VX_{114}	—	May 21, 2015	Cerro Tololo	DECam	THB	2.0 km	MPC · JPL
773243	2018 VP_{118}	—	October 7, 2012	Haleakala	Pan-STARRS 1	·	2.1 km	MPC · JPL
773244	2018 VP_{120}	—	June 18, 2015	Haleakala	Pan-STARRS 1	TIR	2.1 km	MPC · JPL
773245	2018 VL_{121}	—	October 4, 2007	Kitt Peak	Spacewatch	·	2.2 km	MPC · JPL
773246	2018 VW_{121}	—	November 4, 2018	Mount Lemmon	Mount Lemmon Survey	·	2.7 km	MPC · JPL
773247	2018 VR_{123}	—	November 9, 2018	Mount Lemmon	Mount Lemmon Survey	·	2.4 km	MPC · JPL
773248	2018 VW_{123}	—	November 3, 2018	Mount Lemmon	Mount Lemmon Survey	VER	2.0 km	MPC · JPL
773249	2018 VX_{123}	—	November 1, 2018	Mount Lemmon	Mount Lemmon Survey	·	2.1 km	MPC · JPL
773250	2018 VY_{123}	—	October 25, 2012	Mount Lemmon	Mount Lemmon Survey	·	2.3 km	MPC · JPL
773251	2018 VP_{124}	—	May 18, 2015	Haleakala	Pan-STARRS 1	·	1.9 km	MPC · JPL
773252	2018 VU_{124}	—	November 6, 2018	Haleakala	Pan-STARRS 2	·	2.1 km	MPC · JPL
773253	2018 VY_{124}	—	November 5, 2018	Haleakala	Pan-STARRS 2	·	1.8 km	MPC · JPL
773254	2018 VH_{125}	—	November 8, 2018	Mount Lemmon	Mount Lemmon Survey	EOS	1.4 km	MPC · JPL
773255	2018 VK_{125}	—	April 17, 2015	Cerro Tololo	DECam	·	2.2 km	MPC · JPL
773256	2018 VC_{128}	—	November 15, 2018	Kitt Peak	Spacewatch	URS	2.4 km	MPC · JPL
773257	2018 VR_{128}	—	November 6, 2018	Haleakala	Pan-STARRS 2	·	2.2 km	MPC · JPL
773258 Corpodean	2018 VW_{131}	Corpodean	November 6, 2018	Roque de los Muchachos	EURONEAR	·	1.6 km	MPC · JPL
773259	2018 VN_{132}	—	November 27, 2013	Haleakala	Pan-STARRS 1	·	1.8 km	MPC · JPL
773260	2018 VT_{138}	—	November 5, 2018	Haleakala	Pan-STARRS 2	·	2.0 km	MPC · JPL
773261	2018 VV_{138}	—	November 1, 2018	Mount Lemmon	Mount Lemmon Survey	EOS	1.3 km	MPC · JPL
773262	2018 VW_{138}	—	November 1, 2018	Mount Lemmon	Mount Lemmon Survey	·	2.6 km	MPC · JPL
773263	2018 VO_{142}	—	July 26, 2017	Haleakala	Pan-STARRS 1	·	1.5 km	MPC · JPL
773264	2018 VS_{146}	—	November 9, 2018	Mount Lemmon	Mount Lemmon Survey	·	1.9 km	MPC · JPL
773265	2018 VL_{152}	—	March 25, 2015	Haleakala	Pan-STARRS 1	·	2.9 km	MPC · JPL
773266	2018 VV_{152}	—	June 21, 2017	Haleakala	Pan-STARRS 1	·	2.2 km	MPC · JPL
773267	2018 VA_{155}	—	November 4, 2018	Mount Lemmon	Mount Lemmon Survey	·	2.7 km	MPC · JPL
773268	2018 VK_{156}	—	November 6, 2018	Mount Lemmon	Mount Lemmon Survey	·	2.5 km	MPC · JPL
773269	2018 VN_{156}	—	September 11, 2018	Mount Lemmon	Mount Lemmon Survey	·	2.4 km	MPC · JPL
773270	2018 VT_{157}	—	November 4, 2018	Mount Lemmon	Mount Lemmon Survey	LUT	3.3 km	MPC · JPL
773271	2018 VU_{157}	—	October 6, 2012	Mount Lemmon	Mount Lemmon Survey	·	2.2 km	MPC · JPL
773272	2018 VE_{181}	—	November 2, 2018	Mount Lemmon	Mount Lemmon Survey	EOS	1.4 km	MPC · JPL
773273	2018 WP_{5}	—	November 29, 2018	Mount Lemmon	Mount Lemmon Survey	·	3.2 km	MPC · JPL
773274	2018 WU_{5}	—	November 16, 2018	Kitt Peak	Spacewatch	·	2.0 km	MPC · JPL
773275	2018 WV_{5}	—	November 29, 2018	Mount Lemmon	Mount Lemmon Survey	·	2.4 km	MPC · JPL
773276	2018 WD_{8}	—	October 14, 2007	Catalina	CSS	EMA	2.4 km	MPC · JPL
773277	2018 WO_{8}	—	November 17, 2018	Mount Lemmon	Mount Lemmon Survey	·	2.3 km	MPC · JPL
773278	2018 WT_{8}	—	November 17, 2018	Mount Lemmon	Mount Lemmon Survey	EOS	1.3 km	MPC · JPL
773279	2018 WY_{8}	—	May 20, 2015	Cerro Tololo	DECam	·	2.2 km	MPC · JPL
773280	2018 WE_{16}	—	November 19, 2018	Mount Lemmon	Mount Lemmon Survey	TIR	2.3 km	MPC · JPL
773281	2018 XO_{10}	—	November 28, 2013	Mount Lemmon	Mount Lemmon Survey	·	1.4 km	MPC · JPL
773282	2018 XE_{13}	—	September 14, 2007	Mount Lemmon	Mount Lemmon Survey	·	770 m	MPC · JPL
773283	2018 XF_{14}	—	December 28, 2013	Kitt Peak	Spacewatch	·	2.6 km	MPC · JPL
773284	2018 XZ_{19}	—	August 29, 2015	Haleakala	Pan-STARRS 1	H	500 m	MPC · JPL
773285	2018 XM_{21}	—	December 12, 2018	Haleakala	Pan-STARRS 1	·	2.1 km	MPC · JPL
773286	2018 XM_{26}	—	December 10, 2018	Mount Lemmon	Mount Lemmon Survey	·	2.0 km	MPC · JPL
773287	2018 XA_{28}	—	December 3, 2018	Palomar	Zwicky Transient Facility	·	2.5 km	MPC · JPL
773288	2018 XC_{28}	—	December 13, 2018	Haleakala	Pan-STARRS 1	·	2.5 km	MPC · JPL
773289	2018 XJ_{30}	—	November 3, 2007	Mount Lemmon	Mount Lemmon Survey	EUP	3.1 km	MPC · JPL
773290	2018 XB_{31}	—	December 14, 2018	Mount Lemmon	Mount Lemmon Survey	URS	2.4 km	MPC · JPL
773291	2018 XF_{31}	—	December 13, 2018	Haleakala	Pan-STARRS 1	·	2.2 km	MPC · JPL
773292	2018 XY_{34}	—	December 14, 2018	Haleakala	Pan-STARRS 1	T_{j} (2.99) · 3:2	5.4 km	MPC · JPL
773293	2018 XO_{36}	—	December 13, 2018	Haleakala	Pan-STARRS 1	·	2.2 km	MPC · JPL
773294	2018 YB_{5}	—	December 31, 2007	Kitt Peak	Spacewatch	·	2.0 km	MPC · JPL
773295	2018 YS_{9}	—	December 17, 2018	Haleakala	Pan-STARRS 1	·	2.2 km	MPC · JPL
773296	2018 YZ_{10}	—	May 20, 2015	Cerro Tololo	DECam	·	1.9 km	MPC · JPL
773297	2018 YG_{17}	—	January 30, 2014	Kitt Peak	Spacewatch	·	2.4 km	MPC · JPL
773298	2019 AU_{16}	—	April 20, 2009	Kitt Peak	Spacewatch	TIR	2.4 km	MPC · JPL
773299	2019 AG_{18}	—	February 24, 2014	Haleakala	Pan-STARRS 1	·	2.6 km	MPC · JPL
773300	2019 AV_{21}	—	May 20, 2015	Cerro Tololo	DECam	TIR	2.1 km	MPC · JPL

== 773301–773400 ==
back to top

Designation			Discovery			Properties		Ref
Permanent	Provisional	Named after	Date	Site	Discoverer(s)	Category	Diam.	Ref
773301	2019 AZ_{21}	—	June 23, 2017	Haleakala	Pan-STARRS 1	·	2.6 km	MPC · JPL
773302	2019 AY_{29}	—	November 22, 2006	Mount Lemmon	Mount Lemmon Survey	·	2.9 km	MPC · JPL
773303	2019 AG_{31}	—	February 20, 2014	Haleakala	Pan-STARRS 1	·	3.0 km	MPC · JPL
773304	2019 AR_{32}	—	November 26, 2012	Mount Lemmon	Mount Lemmon Survey	·	2.9 km	MPC · JPL
773305	2019 AQ_{33}	—	February 12, 2008	Mount Lemmon	Mount Lemmon Survey	·	2.6 km	MPC · JPL
773306	2019 AZ_{33}	—	September 22, 2017	Haleakala	Pan-STARRS 1	·	2.3 km	MPC · JPL
773307	2019 AM_{34}	—	March 23, 2014	Mount Lemmon	Mount Lemmon Survey	·	2.5 km	MPC · JPL
773308	2019 AM_{43}	—	December 11, 2013	Mount Lemmon	Mount Lemmon Survey	·	2.6 km	MPC · JPL
773309	2019 AG_{48}	—	February 10, 2008	Kitt Peak	Spacewatch	·	2.4 km	MPC · JPL
773310	2019 AF_{50}	—	March 8, 2014	Mount Lemmon	Mount Lemmon Survey	·	2.4 km	MPC · JPL
773311	2019 AA_{55}	—	January 7, 2019	Haleakala	Pan-STARRS 1	·	1.3 km	MPC · JPL
773312	2019 AD_{58}	—	January 3, 2019	Haleakala	Pan-STARRS 1	EOS	1.6 km	MPC · JPL
773313	2019 AU_{58}	—	January 8, 2019	Haleakala	Pan-STARRS 1	·	2.3 km	MPC · JPL
773314	2019 AO_{59}	—	January 10, 2019	Haleakala	Pan-STARRS 1	·	2.6 km	MPC · JPL
773315	2019 AR_{66}	—	April 14, 2015	Mount Lemmon	Mount Lemmon Survey	KOR	1.0 km	MPC · JPL
773316	2019 AS_{81}	—	December 31, 2013	Kitt Peak	Spacewatch	·	2.4 km	MPC · JPL
773317	2019 AQ_{88}	—	November 28, 2013	Haleakala	Pan-STARRS 1	·	1.1 km	MPC · JPL
773318	2019 AF_{99}	—	December 31, 2007	Kitt Peak	Spacewatch	EOS	1.5 km	MPC · JPL
773319	2019 AE_{100}	—	January 13, 2019	Haleakala	Pan-STARRS 1	KOR	1.0 km	MPC · JPL
773320	2019 BT_{9}	—	January 16, 2019	Haleakala	Pan-STARRS 1	PHO	830 m	MPC · JPL
773321	2019 CF_{7}	—	August 28, 2016	Mount Lemmon	Mount Lemmon Survey	URS	3.2 km	MPC · JPL
773322	2019 CS_{9}	—	November 9, 2013	Haleakala	Pan-STARRS 1	·	1.2 km	MPC · JPL
773323	2019 CR_{18}	—	September 23, 2011	Haleakala	Pan-STARRS 1	EOS	1.3 km	MPC · JPL
773324	2019 CL_{19}	—	February 5, 2019	Haleakala	Pan-STARRS 1	EOS	1.4 km	MPC · JPL
773325	2019 CS_{19}	—	February 5, 2019	Haleakala	Pan-STARRS 1	L5	6.9 km	MPC · JPL
773326	2019 FC_{21}	—	March 29, 2019	Mount Lemmon	Mount Lemmon Survey	·	620 m	MPC · JPL
773327	2019 FC_{26}	—	March 29, 2019	Mount Lemmon	Mount Lemmon Survey	·	2.3 km	MPC · JPL
773328	2019 GE_{6}	—	November 20, 2014	Haleakala	Pan-STARRS 1	L5 · (291316)	9.4 km	MPC · JPL
773329	2019 GU_{6}	—	November 18, 2007	Mount Lemmon	Mount Lemmon Survey	·	870 m	MPC · JPL
773330	2019 GT_{7}	—	February 20, 2012	Haleakala	Pan-STARRS 1	·	620 m	MPC · JPL
773331	2019 GH_{9}	—	May 1, 2016	Cerro Tololo	DECam	·	550 m	MPC · JPL
773332	2019 GV_{9}	—	September 21, 2012	Mount Lemmon	Mount Lemmon Survey	L5	6.8 km	MPC · JPL
773333	2019 GV_{10}	—	April 2, 2019	Haleakala	Pan-STARRS 1	L5	6.3 km	MPC · JPL
773334	2019 GK_{11}	—	October 16, 2012	Mount Lemmon	Mount Lemmon Survey	L5	6.4 km	MPC · JPL
773335	2019 GF_{12}	—	April 9, 2003	Kitt Peak	Spacewatch	·	740 m	MPC · JPL
773336	2019 GS_{14}	—	July 7, 2016	Haleakala	Pan-STARRS 1	·	740 m	MPC · JPL
773337	2019 GZ_{23}	—	June 8, 2016	Haleakala	Pan-STARRS 1	·	440 m	MPC · JPL
773338	2019 GB_{28}	—	April 2, 2019	Haleakala	Pan-STARRS 1	·	540 m	MPC · JPL
773339	2019 GF_{37}	—	April 4, 2019	Haleakala	Pan-STARRS 1	·	1.3 km	MPC · JPL
773340	2019 GL_{50}	—	April 5, 2019	Haleakala	Pan-STARRS 1	·	550 m	MPC · JPL
773341	2019 GO_{50}	—	April 6, 2019	Haleakala	Pan-STARRS 1	·	1.3 km	MPC · JPL
773342	2019 GJ_{52}	—	April 2, 2019	Haleakala	Pan-STARRS 1	L5	5.5 km	MPC · JPL
773343	2019 GL_{53}	—	April 2, 2019	Haleakala	Pan-STARRS 1	·	2.1 km	MPC · JPL
773344	2019 GP_{57}	—	April 3, 2019	Haleakala	Pan-STARRS 1	·	490 m	MPC · JPL
773345	2019 GQ_{65}	—	April 4, 2019	Haleakala	Pan-STARRS 1	·	1.0 km	MPC · JPL
773346	2019 GD_{67}	—	April 3, 2019	Haleakala	Pan-STARRS 1	·	960 m	MPC · JPL
773347	2019 GT_{69}	—	April 8, 2019	Haleakala	Pan-STARRS 1	L5	6.8 km	MPC · JPL
773348	2019 GP_{70}	—	April 7, 2019	Mount Lemmon	Mount Lemmon Survey	·	1.0 km	MPC · JPL
773349	2019 GE_{71}	—	April 4, 2019	Haleakala	Pan-STARRS 1	·	1.1 km	MPC · JPL
773350	2019 GS_{74}	—	April 2, 2019	Haleakala	Pan-STARRS 1	L5	6.1 km	MPC · JPL
773351	2019 GV_{74}	—	April 3, 2019	Haleakala	Pan-STARRS 1	L5	6.4 km	MPC · JPL
773352	2019 GA_{80}	—	November 4, 2013	Mount Lemmon	Mount Lemmon Survey	·	840 m	MPC · JPL
773353	2019 GZ_{93}	—	April 5, 2019	Haleakala	Pan-STARRS 1	L5	6.3 km	MPC · JPL
773354	2019 GY_{109}	—	April 3, 2019	Haleakala	Pan-STARRS 1	L5	6.5 km	MPC · JPL
773355	2019 GB_{112}	—	April 2, 2019	Haleakala	Pan-STARRS 1	L5	7.0 km	MPC · JPL
773356	2019 HA_{6}	—	August 30, 2011	Piszkéstető	K. Sárneczky	JUN	830 m	MPC · JPL
773357	2019 JO_{9}	—	April 24, 2006	Kitt Peak	Spacewatch	·	1.3 km	MPC · JPL
773358	2019 JG_{11}	—	July 31, 2016	Haleakala	Pan-STARRS 1	·	520 m	MPC · JPL
773359	2019 JY_{19}	—	October 13, 2007	Mount Lemmon	Mount Lemmon Survey	·	1.7 km	MPC · JPL
773360	2019 JG_{21}	—	August 2, 2016	Haleakala	Pan-STARRS 1	·	880 m	MPC · JPL
773361	2019 JJ_{25}	—	December 5, 2007	Mount Lemmon	Mount Lemmon Survey	·	480 m	MPC · JPL
773362	2019 JK_{39}	—	May 22, 2006	Kitt Peak	Spacewatch	·	1.2 km	MPC · JPL
773363	2019 JW_{39}	—	November 20, 2000	Apache Point	SDSS	·	1.0 km	MPC · JPL
773364	2019 JY_{48}	—	May 11, 2019	Haleakala	Pan-STARRS 1	·	1.2 km	MPC · JPL
773365	2019 JK_{58}	—	January 10, 2013	Haleakala	Pan-STARRS 1	·	1.6 km	MPC · JPL
773366	2019 JX_{71}	—	May 1, 2019	Haleakala	Pan-STARRS 1	·	720 m	MPC · JPL
773367	2019 JB_{83}	—	June 11, 2015	Haleakala	Pan-STARRS 1	·	790 m	MPC · JPL
773368	2019 JE_{94}	—	May 9, 2019	Haleakala	Pan-STARRS 1	·	950 m	MPC · JPL
773369	2019 JD_{104}	—	May 29, 2015	Haleakala	Pan-STARRS 1	·	690 m	MPC · JPL
773370	2019 JM_{108}	—	January 12, 2014	Mount Lemmon	Mount Lemmon Survey	·	1.1 km	MPC · JPL
773371	2019 JD_{119}	—	May 8, 2019	Haleakala	Pan-STARRS 1	·	1.1 km	MPC · JPL
773372	2019 KO_{2}	—	September 1, 2017	Haleakala	Pan-STARRS 1	H	310 m	MPC · JPL
773373	2019 KC_{5}	—	November 10, 2009	Mount Lemmon	Mount Lemmon Survey	L4	7.9 km	MPC · JPL
773374	2019 KH_{12}	—	October 24, 2009	Kitt Peak	Spacewatch	PHO	660 m	MPC · JPL
773375	2019 KM_{20}	—	May 27, 2019	Haleakala	Pan-STARRS 1	·	980 m	MPC · JPL
773376	2019 KQ_{34}	—	May 29, 2019	Haleakala	Pan-STARRS 2	·	1.2 km	MPC · JPL
773377	2019 KL_{41}	—	May 30, 2019	Haleakala	Pan-STARRS 1	·	1.4 km	MPC · JPL
773378	2019 KB_{46}	—	August 3, 2016	Haleakala	Pan-STARRS 1	·	1.0 km	MPC · JPL
773379	2019 LT_{3}	—	June 9, 2019	Haleakala	Pan-STARRS 1	L4	8.7 km	MPC · JPL
773380	2019 LN_{6}	—	September 29, 2008	Mount Lemmon	Mount Lemmon Survey	L4	7.6 km	MPC · JPL
773381	2019 LB_{10}	—	April 28, 2014	Cerro Tololo	DECam	·	1.3 km	MPC · JPL
773382	2019 LR_{10}	—	January 20, 2012	Kitt Peak	Spacewatch	·	1.5 km	MPC · JPL
773383	2019 LS_{13}	—	June 1, 2019	Haleakala	Pan-STARRS 1	·	940 m	MPC · JPL
773384	2019 LK_{17}	—	June 1, 2019	Haleakala	Pan-STARRS 1	·	930 m	MPC · JPL
773385	2019 LV_{31}	—	June 12, 2019	Haleakala	Pan-STARRS 1	·	1.6 km	MPC · JPL
773386	2019 MN_{3}	—	May 19, 2004	Kitt Peak	Spacewatch	·	750 m	MPC · JPL
773387	2019 MJ_{6}	—	October 24, 2015	Haleakala	Pan-STARRS 1	·	1.2 km	MPC · JPL
773388	2019 MN_{7}	—	April 15, 2012	Haleakala	Pan-STARRS 1	·	630 m	MPC · JPL
773389	2019 ME_{12}	—	June 30, 2019	Haleakala	Pan-STARRS 1	·	1.2 km	MPC · JPL
773390	2019 MH_{12}	—	June 30, 2019	Haleakala	Pan-STARRS 1	·	1.4 km	MPC · JPL
773391	2019 MN_{12}	—	May 1, 2016	Cerro Tololo	DECam	L4	5.7 km	MPC · JPL
773392	2019 MB_{13}	—	June 28, 2019	Haleakala	Pan-STARRS 1	EUN	940 m	MPC · JPL
773393	2019 MH_{14}	—	June 24, 2019	Palomar	Zwicky Transient Facility	EUN	1.3 km	MPC · JPL
773394	2019 ME_{15}	—	November 13, 2010	Mount Lemmon	Mount Lemmon Survey	L4 · (222861)	6.3 km	MPC · JPL
773395	2019 ML_{17}	—	June 30, 2019	Haleakala	Pan-STARRS 1	EOS	1.2 km	MPC · JPL
773396	2019 MW_{17}	—	June 30, 2019	Haleakala	Pan-STARRS 1	L4	7.8 km	MPC · JPL
773397	2019 MX_{17}	—	June 28, 2019	Haleakala	Pan-STARRS 1	·	1.1 km	MPC · JPL
773398	2019 MN_{18}	—	August 12, 2007	XuYi	PMO NEO Survey Program	·	1.1 km	MPC · JPL
773399	2019 MT_{19}	—	June 30, 2019	Haleakala	Pan-STARRS 1	L4	6.5 km	MPC · JPL
773400	2019 MR_{21}	—	June 30, 2019	Haleakala	Pan-STARRS 1	·	1.3 km	MPC · JPL

== 773401–773500 ==
back to top

Designation			Discovery			Properties		Ref
Permanent	Provisional	Named after	Date	Site	Discoverer(s)	Category	Diam.	Ref
773401	2019 MW_{21}	—	April 28, 2014	Cerro Tololo	DECam	·	1.5 km	MPC · JPL
773402	2019 MX_{25}	—	June 28, 2019	Haleakala	Pan-STARRS 1	·	1.1 km	MPC · JPL
773403	2019 NH	—	July 25, 2014	Haleakala	Pan-STARRS 1	H	310 m	MPC · JPL
773404	2019 NS_{1}	—	November 2, 2007	Catalina	CSS	·	1.5 km	MPC · JPL
773405	2019 NL_{3}	—	November 26, 2014	Haleakala	Pan-STARRS 1	L5	8.2 km	MPC · JPL
773406	2019 NU_{3}	—	January 19, 2017	Mount Lemmon	Mount Lemmon Survey	·	1.1 km	MPC · JPL
773407	2019 NZ_{10}	—	February 22, 2014	Kitt Peak	Spacewatch	L4	6.5 km	MPC · JPL
773408	2019 NG_{14}	—	June 19, 2010	Mount Lemmon	Mount Lemmon Survey	·	1.3 km	MPC · JPL
773409	2019 NK_{22}	—	May 28, 2014	Haleakala	Pan-STARRS 1	·	1.2 km	MPC · JPL
773410	2019 NM_{38}	—	May 23, 2014	Haleakala	Pan-STARRS 1	·	1.2 km	MPC · JPL
773411	2019 NV_{38}	—	July 1, 2019	Haleakala	Pan-STARRS 1	·	2.4 km	MPC · JPL
773412	2019 NE_{40}	—	October 18, 2015	Haleakala	Pan-STARRS 1	AGN	760 m	MPC · JPL
773413	2019 NZ_{40}	—	July 7, 2019	Haleakala	Pan-STARRS 1	·	840 m	MPC · JPL
773414	2019 NV_{41}	—	July 2, 2019	Haleakala	Pan-STARRS 1	·	1 km	MPC · JPL
773415	2019 NF_{48}	—	July 3, 2019	Haleakala	Pan-STARRS 2	L4	8.5 km	MPC · JPL
773416	2019 NH_{51}	—	April 18, 2015	Cerro Tololo	DECam	L4	5.3 km	MPC · JPL
773417	2019 NL_{51}	—	July 5, 2019	Haleakala	Pan-STARRS 2	L4	6.6 km	MPC · JPL
773418	2019 NC_{53}	—	July 10, 2019	Haleakala	Pan-STARRS 1	L4	6.9 km	MPC · JPL
773419	2019 NT_{53}	—	November 12, 2010	Mount Lemmon	Mount Lemmon Survey	L4	6.2 km	MPC · JPL
773420	2019 ND_{54}	—	July 4, 2019	Haleakala	Pan-STARRS 1	·	960 m	MPC · JPL
773421	2019 NR_{58}	—	July 4, 2019	Haleakala	Pan-STARRS 1	L4 · ERY	6.8 km	MPC · JPL
773422	2019 NT_{58}	—	July 5, 2019	Haleakala	Pan-STARRS 2	L4	6.0 km	MPC · JPL
773423	2019 NU_{58}	—	March 28, 2015	Kitt Peak	Spacewatch	L4	6.7 km	MPC · JPL
773424	2019 NV_{58}	—	July 1, 2019	Haleakala	Pan-STARRS 1	L4	5.9 km	MPC · JPL
773425	2019 NX_{58}	—	July 1, 2019	Haleakala	Pan-STARRS 1	L4	6.5 km	MPC · JPL
773426	2019 ND_{74}	—	September 2, 2010	Mount Lemmon	Mount Lemmon Survey	·	1.4 km	MPC · JPL
773427	2019 NR_{74}	—	April 18, 2015	Cerro Tololo	DECam	L4	6.8 km	MPC · JPL
773428	2019 NK_{79}	—	July 5, 2019	Haleakala	Pan-STARRS 1	·	910 m	MPC · JPL
773429	2019 NW_{84}	—	October 16, 2015	Kitt Peak	Spacewatch	·	1.4 km	MPC · JPL
773430	2019 OZ_{9}	—	October 9, 2008	Mount Lemmon	Mount Lemmon Survey	·	890 m	MPC · JPL
773431	2019 OT_{11}	—	May 26, 2015	Haleakala	Pan-STARRS 1	ERI	1.1 km	MPC · JPL
773432	2019 OX_{14}	—	October 20, 2006	Kitt Peak	Spacewatch	·	1.4 km	MPC · JPL
773433	2019 OK_{19}	—	October 3, 2015	Mount Lemmon	Mount Lemmon Survey	·	1.4 km	MPC · JPL
773434	2019 OJ_{21}	—	April 30, 2014	Haleakala	Pan-STARRS 1	·	1.3 km	MPC · JPL
773435	2019 OX_{27}	—	July 25, 2019	Haleakala	Pan-STARRS 1	L4	7.1 km	MPC · JPL
773436	2019 OC_{28}	—	July 26, 2019	Haleakala	Pan-STARRS 1	L4	7.5 km	MPC · JPL
773437	2019 OT_{32}	—	January 5, 2013	Kitt Peak	Spacewatch	L4	6.6 km	MPC · JPL
773438	2019 OP_{34}	—	January 17, 2015	Haleakala	Pan-STARRS 1	·	600 m	MPC · JPL
773439	2019 OL_{39}	—	July 25, 2019	Haleakala	Pan-STARRS 1	L4	7.0 km	MPC · JPL
773440	2019 OX_{39}	—	April 30, 2014	Haleakala	Pan-STARRS 1	·	980 m	MPC · JPL
773441	2019 OD_{58}	—	October 19, 2015	Haleakala	Pan-STARRS 1	·	1.3 km	MPC · JPL
773442	2019 PL_{11}	—	March 10, 2007	Mount Lemmon	Mount Lemmon Survey	NYS	930 m	MPC · JPL
773443	2019 PP_{18}	—	August 5, 2019	Haleakala	Pan-STARRS 1	BAR	810 m	MPC · JPL
773444	2019 PQ_{22}	—	April 28, 2014	Cerro Tololo	DECam	·	1.3 km	MPC · JPL
773445	2019 PU_{27}	—	April 29, 2014	Cerro Tololo	DECam	·	1.1 km	MPC · JPL
773446	2019 PB_{34}	—	June 24, 2014	Haleakala	Pan-STARRS 1	EUN	880 m	MPC · JPL
773447	2019 PF_{36}	—	August 8, 2019	Haleakala	Pan-STARRS 1	BRG	1.2 km	MPC · JPL
773448	2019 PR_{36}	—	August 4, 2019	Haleakala	Pan-STARRS 1	·	1.6 km	MPC · JPL
773449	2019 PX_{44}	—	April 19, 2015	Cerro Tololo	DECam	L4 · ERY	5.5 km	MPC · JPL
773450	2019 PQ_{45}	—	August 5, 2019	Haleakala	Pan-STARRS 1	·	1.4 km	MPC · JPL
773451	2019 PX_{63}	—	May 27, 2014	Haleakala	Pan-STARRS 1	EUN	920 m	MPC · JPL
773452	2019 PU_{65}	—	August 5, 2019	Haleakala	Pan-STARRS 1	L4	6.0 km	MPC · JPL
773453	2019 QN_{8}	—	September 18, 2011	Catalina	CSS	·	1.4 km	MPC · JPL
773454	2019 QD_{10}	—	January 18, 2008	Mount Lemmon	Mount Lemmon Survey	·	1.1 km	MPC · JPL
773455	2019 QW_{12}	—	September 10, 2010	Mount Lemmon	Mount Lemmon Survey	EUN	950 m	MPC · JPL
773456	2019 QO_{28}	—	November 3, 2015	Mount Lemmon	Mount Lemmon Survey	AEO	800 m	MPC · JPL
773457	2019 QV_{30}	—	August 21, 2019	Mount Lemmon	Mount Lemmon Survey	·	910 m	MPC · JPL
773458	2019 QO_{31}	—	June 27, 2014	Haleakala	Pan-STARRS 1	·	1.3 km	MPC · JPL
773459	2019 QV_{31}	—	August 24, 2019	Haleakala	Pan-STARRS 1	·	1.5 km	MPC · JPL
773460	2019 QO_{33}	—	August 22, 2019	Haleakala	Pan-STARRS 1	EUN	990 m	MPC · JPL
773461	2019 QT_{33}	—	August 31, 2019	Haleakala	Pan-STARRS 1	·	1.0 km	MPC · JPL
773462	2019 QZ_{48}	—	January 5, 2013	Kitt Peak	Spacewatch	L4	5.9 km	MPC · JPL
773463	2019 QE_{79}	—	April 18, 2015	Cerro Tololo	DECam	L4	5.6 km	MPC · JPL
773464	2019 QZ_{81}	—	August 31, 2019	Haleakala	Pan-STARRS 1	·	1.8 km	MPC · JPL
773465	2019 RB_{18}	—	October 21, 2008	Mount Lemmon	Mount Lemmon Survey	·	2.4 km	MPC · JPL
773466	2019 RW_{25}	—	January 31, 2009	Kitt Peak	Spacewatch	·	980 m	MPC · JPL
773467	2019 RH_{29}	—	September 4, 2019	Mount Lemmon	Mount Lemmon Survey	·	1.1 km	MPC · JPL
773468	2019 RT_{38}	—	October 29, 2010	Kitt Peak	Spacewatch	·	1.6 km	MPC · JPL
773469	2019 RY_{41}	—	September 27, 2011	Mount Lemmon	Mount Lemmon Survey	·	1.3 km	MPC · JPL
773470	2019 RF_{57}	—	September 4, 2019	Mount Lemmon	Mount Lemmon Survey	·	1.5 km	MPC · JPL
773471	2019 RL_{58}	—	September 8, 2019	Haleakala	Pan-STARRS 1	EOS	1.4 km	MPC · JPL
773472	2019 RG_{63}	—	September 5, 2019	Mount Lemmon	Mount Lemmon Survey	·	980 m	MPC · JPL
773473	2019 RP_{73}	—	September 4, 2019	Haleakala	Pan-STARRS 1	·	1.5 km	MPC · JPL
773474	2019 RL_{77}	—	September 10, 2019	Haleakala	Pan-STARRS 1	526	1.9 km	MPC · JPL
773475	2019 RF_{84}	—	April 22, 2009	Mount Lemmon	Mount Lemmon Survey	·	1.3 km	MPC · JPL
773476	2019 SC_{3}	—	September 4, 2011	Haleakala	Pan-STARRS 1	·	1.0 km	MPC · JPL
773477	2019 SM_{18}	—	April 30, 2009	Kitt Peak	Spacewatch	·	640 m	MPC · JPL
773478	2019 SP_{31}	—	January 19, 2012	Haleakala	Pan-STARRS 1	·	1.7 km	MPC · JPL
773479	2019 SU_{35}	—	November 26, 2003	Kitt Peak	Spacewatch	·	1.9 km	MPC · JPL
773480	2019 SX_{37}	—	September 17, 2010	Kitt Peak	Spacewatch	·	1.3 km	MPC · JPL
773481	2019 SQ_{40}	—	August 15, 2013	Haleakala	Pan-STARRS 1	EOS	1.3 km	MPC · JPL
773482	2019 SJ_{44}	—	October 23, 2006	Kitt Peak	Spacewatch	·	1.4 km	MPC · JPL
773483	2019 SP_{45}	—	April 13, 2013	Haleakala	Pan-STARRS 1	·	1.9 km	MPC · JPL
773484	2019 SC_{46}	—	April 1, 2017	Haleakala	Pan-STARRS 1	VER	2.1 km	MPC · JPL
773485	2019 SW_{50}	—	February 21, 2017	Haleakala	Pan-STARRS 1	HNS	910 m	MPC · JPL
773486	2019 SF_{54}	—	September 26, 2019	Haleakala	Pan-STARRS 1	HNS	850 m	MPC · JPL
773487	2019 SR_{63}	—	October 24, 2015	Haleakala	Pan-STARRS 1	EUN	880 m	MPC · JPL
773488	2019 SM_{66}	—	October 30, 2005	Kitt Peak	Spacewatch	·	1.3 km	MPC · JPL
773489	2019 SR_{66}	—	August 10, 2015	Haleakala	Pan-STARRS 1	·	840 m	MPC · JPL
773490	2019 SV_{72}	—	November 3, 2010	Kitt Peak	Spacewatch	·	1.5 km	MPC · JPL
773491	2019 SW_{76}	—	October 8, 2008	Mount Lemmon	Mount Lemmon Survey	EOS	1.5 km	MPC · JPL
773492	2019 SP_{80}	—	September 20, 2014	Haleakala	Pan-STARRS 1	AGN	880 m	MPC · JPL
773493	2019 SV_{82}	—	September 27, 2019	Haleakala	Pan-STARRS 1	·	2.5 km	MPC · JPL
773494	2019 SG_{83}	—	September 24, 2019	Haleakala	Pan-STARRS 1	·	1.6 km	MPC · JPL
773495	2019 SE_{84}	—	September 24, 2019	Haleakala	Pan-STARRS 1	·	1.0 km	MPC · JPL
773496	2019 SL_{85}	—	October 9, 2012	Haleakala	Pan-STARRS 1	·	530 m	MPC · JPL
773497	2019 SC_{86}	—	September 25, 2019	Haleakala	Pan-STARRS 1	·	1.3 km	MPC · JPL
773498	2019 SY_{90}	—	September 28, 2019	Mount Lemmon	Mount Lemmon Survey	·	1.2 km	MPC · JPL
773499	2019 SL_{108}	—	September 26, 2019	Haleakala	Pan-STARRS 1	EUN	1.0 km	MPC · JPL
773500	2019 SS_{108}	—	September 27, 2019	Haleakala	Pan-STARRS 1	·	1.4 km	MPC · JPL

== 773501–773600 ==
back to top

Designation			Discovery			Properties		Ref
Permanent	Provisional	Named after	Date	Site	Discoverer(s)	Category	Diam.	Ref
773501	2019 SC_{115}	—	September 27, 2019	Haleakala	Pan-STARRS 1	·	910 m	MPC · JPL
773502	2019 SQ_{124}	—	September 30, 2019	Haleakala	Pan-STARRS 1	·	1.5 km	MPC · JPL
773503	2019 SO_{131}	—	September 30, 2019	Mount Lemmon	Mount Lemmon Survey	AGN	760 m	MPC · JPL
773504	2019 SA_{150}	—	September 27, 2019	Haleakala	Pan-STARRS 1	·	1.5 km	MPC · JPL
773505	2019 SV_{155}	—	September 29, 2019	Haleakala	Pan-STARRS 1	ARM	2.3 km	MPC · JPL
773506	2019 SL_{177}	—	January 30, 2017	Haleakala	Pan-STARRS 1	·	1.7 km	MPC · JPL
773507	2019 SH_{184}	—	September 27, 2019	Haleakala	Pan-STARRS 1	·	2.3 km	MPC · JPL
773508	2019 SV_{184}	—	July 28, 2014	Haleakala	Pan-STARRS 1	·	1.2 km	MPC · JPL
773509	2019 SH_{189}	—	June 5, 2016	Haleakala	Pan-STARRS 1	L4	5.8 km	MPC · JPL
773510	2019 SY_{191}	—	September 25, 2019	Haleakala	Pan-STARRS 1	·	1.3 km	MPC · JPL
773511	2019 SB_{192}	—	November 18, 2011	Mount Lemmon	Mount Lemmon Survey	·	1.4 km	MPC · JPL
773512	2019 SV_{194}	—	September 28, 2019	Mount Lemmon	Mount Lemmon Survey	·	1.5 km	MPC · JPL
773513	2019 TB_{10}	—	October 9, 2010	Mount Lemmon	Mount Lemmon Survey	HNS	860 m	MPC · JPL
773514	2019 TG_{14}	—	September 14, 2006	Kitt Peak	Spacewatch	·	1.4 km	MPC · JPL
773515	2019 TL_{16}	—	October 23, 2008	Kitt Peak	Spacewatch	·	2.2 km	MPC · JPL
773516	2019 TX_{20}	—	October 30, 2010	Mount Lemmon	Mount Lemmon Survey	·	1.2 km	MPC · JPL
773517	2019 TQ_{28}	—	October 5, 2019	Haleakala	Pan-STARRS 1	DOR	1.7 km	MPC · JPL
773518	2019 TM_{41}	—	September 27, 2003	Kitt Peak	Spacewatch	·	2.0 km	MPC · JPL
773519	2019 TY_{44}	—	October 3, 2019	Mount Lemmon	Mount Lemmon Survey	·	1.8 km	MPC · JPL
773520	2019 TB_{49}	—	August 20, 2014	Haleakala	Pan-STARRS 1	·	1.6 km	MPC · JPL
773521	2019 TO_{49}	—	October 24, 2014	Mount Lemmon	Mount Lemmon Survey	·	1.2 km	MPC · JPL
773522	2019 TC_{64}	—	February 25, 2012	Catalina	CSS	·	1.4 km	MPC · JPL
773523	2019 TG_{66}	—	October 5, 2019	Haleakala	Pan-STARRS 1	·	970 m	MPC · JPL
773524	2019 TH_{69}	—	October 5, 2019	Haleakala	Pan-STARRS 1	·	1.3 km	MPC · JPL
773525	2019 TU_{78}	—	September 28, 2011	Kitt Peak	Spacewatch	EUN	750 m	MPC · JPL
773526	2019 UK_{16}	—	November 9, 2008	Kitt Peak	Spacewatch	·	2.0 km	MPC · JPL
773527	2019 UL_{18}	—	January 4, 2016	Haleakala	Pan-STARRS 1	·	1.4 km	MPC · JPL
773528	2019 UL_{21}	—	October 14, 2010	Mount Lemmon	Mount Lemmon Survey	·	1.2 km	MPC · JPL
773529	2019 UL_{32}	—	October 2, 2014	Mount Lemmon	Mount Lemmon Survey	AGN	820 m	MPC · JPL
773530	2019 UH_{34}	—	October 31, 2019	Haleakala	Pan-STARRS 1	TEL	1.1 km	MPC · JPL
773531	2019 UX_{35}	—	October 27, 2019	Haleakala	Pan-STARRS 1	·	2.3 km	MPC · JPL
773532	2019 UQ_{43}	—	September 1, 2013	Mount Lemmon	Mount Lemmon Survey	·	2.0 km	MPC · JPL
773533	2019 UQ_{45}	—	January 17, 2016	Haleakala	Pan-STARRS 1	EOS	1.3 km	MPC · JPL
773534	2019 UH_{49}	—	June 24, 2014	Haleakala	Pan-STARRS 1	·	1.8 km	MPC · JPL
773535	2019 UD_{64}	—	January 31, 2006	Kitt Peak	Spacewatch	·	1.2 km	MPC · JPL
773536	2019 US_{67}	—	January 13, 2004	Kitt Peak	Spacewatch	·	900 m	MPC · JPL
773537	2019 UB_{70}	—	July 25, 2014	Haleakala	Pan-STARRS 1	·	1.2 km	MPC · JPL
773538	2019 UE_{70}	—	April 1, 2017	Haleakala	Pan-STARRS 1	·	1.5 km	MPC · JPL
773539	2019 UU_{101}	—	October 30, 2019	Kitt Peak	Spacewatch	BAR	1.2 km	MPC · JPL
773540	2019 UY_{101}	—	October 21, 2019	Mount Lemmon	Mount Lemmon Survey	·	1.9 km	MPC · JPL
773541	2019 UB_{104}	—	March 3, 2016	Haleakala	Pan-STARRS 1	·	2.1 km	MPC · JPL
773542	2019 UG_{116}	—	October 28, 2019	Haleakala	Pan-STARRS 1	EMA	2.2 km	MPC · JPL
773543	2019 UG_{119}	—	May 21, 2014	Haleakala	Pan-STARRS 1	·	720 m	MPC · JPL
773544	2019 UL_{123}	—	March 30, 2011	Mount Lemmon	Mount Lemmon Survey	·	2.0 km	MPC · JPL
773545	2019 UG_{127}	—	October 28, 2005	Kitt Peak	Spacewatch	·	1.4 km	MPC · JPL
773546	2019 UB_{129}	—	December 23, 2012	Haleakala	Pan-STARRS 1	·	850 m	MPC · JPL
773547	2019 UE_{129}	—	October 24, 2019	Haleakala	Pan-STARRS 1	·	1.4 km	MPC · JPL
773548	2019 VE_{8}	—	November 5, 2019	Mount Lemmon	Mount Lemmon Survey	·	2.6 km	MPC · JPL
773549	2019 VH_{8}	—	November 2, 2019	Haleakala	Pan-STARRS 1	·	610 m	MPC · JPL
773550	2019 VL_{8}	—	November 4, 2019	Haleakala	Pan-STARRS 1	·	2.4 km	MPC · JPL
773551	2019 VH_{19}	—	November 2, 2019	Haleakala	Pan-STARRS 1	·	1.6 km	MPC · JPL
773552	2019 VM_{29}	—	November 3, 2019	Haleakala	Pan-STARRS 1	·	2.4 km	MPC · JPL
773553	2019 VV_{33}	—	October 27, 2008	Kitt Peak	Spacewatch	·	2.1 km	MPC · JPL
773554	2019 VA_{35}	—	February 3, 2016	Haleakala	Pan-STARRS 1	EOS	1.6 km	MPC · JPL
773555	2019 VT_{37}	—	November 5, 2019	Mount Lemmon	Mount Lemmon Survey	·	2.2 km	MPC · JPL
773556	2019 VP_{56}	—	November 22, 2015	Mount Lemmon	Mount Lemmon Survey	·	1.5 km	MPC · JPL
773557	2019 WW_{7}	—	November 26, 2019	Haleakala	Pan-STARRS 1	·	1.5 km	MPC · JPL
773558	2019 WJ_{8}	—	November 19, 2019	Mount Lemmon	Mount Lemmon Survey	EOS	1.4 km	MPC · JPL
773559	2019 WM_{13}	—	January 18, 2015	Mount Lemmon	Mount Lemmon Survey	·	2.2 km	MPC · JPL
773560	2019 WB_{18}	—	November 28, 2019	Haleakala	Pan-STARRS 2	·	2.0 km	MPC · JPL
773561	2019 WM_{21}	—	April 6, 2008	Catalina	CSS	(1547)	1.3 km	MPC · JPL
773562	2019 WC_{26}	—	January 17, 2015	Haleakala	Pan-STARRS 1	·	2.2 km	MPC · JPL
773563	2019 WA_{29}	—	December 12, 2014	Haleakala	Pan-STARRS 1	·	1.4 km	MPC · JPL
773564	2019 XF_{11}	—	September 13, 2013	Mount Lemmon	Mount Lemmon Survey	·	1.5 km	MPC · JPL
773565	2019 XG_{11}	—	December 21, 2014	Mount Lemmon	Mount Lemmon Survey	·	1.6 km	MPC · JPL
773566	2019 XS_{13}	—	October 19, 2011	Mount Lemmon	Mount Lemmon Survey	SYL	2.8 km	MPC · JPL
773567	2019 XD_{14}	—	January 25, 2015	Haleakala	Pan-STARRS 1	·	2.2 km	MPC · JPL
773568	2019 XL_{14}	—	November 1, 2008	Kitt Peak	Spacewatch	·	1.7 km	MPC · JPL
773569	2019 XK_{23}	—	January 15, 2015	Haleakala	Pan-STARRS 1	·	1.9 km	MPC · JPL
773570	2019 YX_{4}	—	July 28, 2014	Haleakala	Pan-STARRS 1	·	1.2 km	MPC · JPL
773571	2019 YT_{7}	—	December 28, 2019	Haleakala	Pan-STARRS 1	VER	1.9 km	MPC · JPL
773572	2019 YV_{7}	—	December 17, 2019	Mount Lemmon	Mount Lemmon Survey	·	3.1 km	MPC · JPL
773573	2019 YK_{8}	—	December 21, 2019	Mount Lemmon	Mount Lemmon Survey	·	1.9 km	MPC · JPL
773574	2019 YM_{11}	—	October 17, 2018	Haleakala	Pan-STARRS 2	·	2.3 km	MPC · JPL
773575	2019 YT_{14}	—	November 19, 2003	Kitt Peak	Spacewatch	·	950 m	MPC · JPL
773576	2019 YD_{15}	—	March 25, 2015	Haleakala	Pan-STARRS 1	·	2.1 km	MPC · JPL
773577	2019 YB_{24}	—	September 10, 2018	Mount Lemmon	Mount Lemmon Survey	·	1.9 km	MPC · JPL
773578	2019 YJ_{29}	—	December 20, 2019	Mount Lemmon	Mount Lemmon Survey	615	990 m	MPC · JPL
773579	2019 YX_{35}	—	December 20, 2019	Mount Lemmon	Mount Lemmon Survey	·	1.3 km	MPC · JPL
773580	2019 YF_{37}	—	October 4, 2007	Kitt Peak	Spacewatch	·	2.0 km	MPC · JPL
773581	2019 YZ_{37}	—	December 28, 2019	Haleakala	Pan-STARRS 1	·	2.3 km	MPC · JPL
773582	2019 YB_{42}	—	November 9, 2013	Haleakala	Pan-STARRS 1	VER	2.2 km	MPC · JPL
773583	2020 AY	—	October 15, 2016	Haleakala	Pan-STARRS 1	H	410 m	MPC · JPL
773584	2020 AN_{5}	—	January 4, 2020	Mount Lemmon	Mount Lemmon Survey	·	2.1 km	MPC · JPL
773585	2020 AX_{5}	—	January 2, 2020	Haleakala	Pan-STARRS 1	·	2.4 km	MPC · JPL
773586	2020 AP_{6}	—	April 18, 2015	Cerro Tololo	DECam	VER	2.3 km	MPC · JPL
773587	2020 AA_{9}	—	November 23, 2008	Mount Lemmon	Mount Lemmon Survey	·	2.0 km	MPC · JPL
773588	2020 AZ_{11}	—	March 18, 2015	Haleakala	Pan-STARRS 1	·	2.3 km	MPC · JPL
773589	2020 AT_{16}	—	November 1, 2018	Mount Lemmon	Mount Lemmon Survey	EOS	1.4 km	MPC · JPL
773590	2020 AG_{21}	—	January 18, 2015	Haleakala	Pan-STARRS 1	·	2.5 km	MPC · JPL
773591	2020 AJ_{21}	—	January 3, 2020	Mount Lemmon	Mount Lemmon Survey	·	1.7 km	MPC · JPL
773592	2020 AM_{21}	—	January 25, 2009	Catalina	CSS	·	2.5 km	MPC · JPL
773593	2020 AN_{21}	—	December 26, 2014	Haleakala	Pan-STARRS 1	EOS	1.5 km	MPC · JPL
773594	2020 AN_{23}	—	January 5, 2020	Mount Lemmon	Mount Lemmon Survey	·	1.6 km	MPC · JPL
773595	2020 BT_{16}	—	January 31, 2015	Haleakala	Pan-STARRS 1	EOS	1.4 km	MPC · JPL
773596	2020 BV_{17}	—	May 19, 2015	Haleakala	Pan-STARRS 1	·	2.5 km	MPC · JPL
773597	2020 BT_{18}	—	January 19, 2020	Haleakala	Pan-STARRS 1	EOS	1.6 km	MPC · JPL
773598	2020 BE_{20}	—	January 22, 2020	Haleakala	Pan-STARRS 1	·	2.2 km	MPC · JPL
773599	2020 BT_{27}	—	January 20, 2015	Haleakala	Pan-STARRS 1	·	1.4 km	MPC · JPL
773600	2020 BX_{27}	—	September 6, 2010	Mount Lemmon	Mount Lemmon Survey	·	3.1 km	MPC · JPL

== 773601–773700 ==
back to top

Designation			Discovery			Properties		Ref
Permanent	Provisional	Named after	Date	Site	Discoverer(s)	Category	Diam.	Ref
773601	2020 BA_{43}	—	April 29, 2012	Kitt Peak	Spacewatch	·	1.2 km	MPC · JPL
773602	2020 BU_{44}	—	September 12, 2018	Mount Lemmon	Mount Lemmon Survey	HOF	1.8 km	MPC · JPL
773603	2020 BQ_{45}	—	January 10, 2014	Mount Lemmon	Mount Lemmon Survey	·	2.3 km	MPC · JPL
773604	2020 BN_{48}	—	January 3, 2009	Kitt Peak	Spacewatch	·	1.7 km	MPC · JPL
773605	2020 BK_{50}	—	May 21, 2015	Haleakala	Pan-STARRS 1	·	2.9 km	MPC · JPL
773606	2020 BE_{52}	—	January 23, 2015	Haleakala	Pan-STARRS 1	·	2.2 km	MPC · JPL
773607	2020 BY_{53}	—	February 21, 2009	Kitt Peak	Spacewatch	·	2.7 km	MPC · JPL
773608	2020 BG_{55}	—	September 11, 2017	Haleakala	Pan-STARRS 1	TIR	2.4 km	MPC · JPL
773609	2020 BM_{61}	—	January 23, 2020	Haleakala	Pan-STARRS 1	EOS	1.3 km	MPC · JPL
773610	2020 BE_{63}	—	January 23, 2020	Haleakala	Pan-STARRS 1	·	1.9 km	MPC · JPL
773611	2020 BG_{63}	—	November 10, 2018	Mount Lemmon	Mount Lemmon Survey	·	2.0 km	MPC · JPL
773612	2020 BH_{63}	—	January 23, 2020	Mount Lemmon	Mount Lemmon Survey	·	2.1 km	MPC · JPL
773613	2020 BQ_{65}	—	January 24, 2020	Mount Lemmon	Mount Lemmon Survey	·	1.9 km	MPC · JPL
773614	2020 BF_{67}	—	February 28, 2012	Haleakala	Pan-STARRS 1	·	1.1 km	MPC · JPL
773615	2020 BP_{70}	—	January 22, 2020	Haleakala	Pan-STARRS 1	·	1.8 km	MPC · JPL
773616	2020 BQ_{75}	—	January 22, 2020	Haleakala	Pan-STARRS 1	·	1.7 km	MPC · JPL
773617	2020 BE_{76}	—	January 17, 2015	Haleakala	Pan-STARRS 1	·	1.2 km	MPC · JPL
773618	2020 BQ_{76}	—	January 24, 2020	Mount Lemmon	Mount Lemmon Survey	·	1.2 km	MPC · JPL
773619	2020 BY_{76}	—	March 21, 2015	Haleakala	Pan-STARRS 1	·	2.5 km	MPC · JPL
773620	2020 BU_{77}	—	January 21, 2020	Haleakala	Pan-STARRS 1	·	1.8 km	MPC · JPL
773621	2020 BU_{85}	—	November 2, 2013	Mount Lemmon	Mount Lemmon Survey	·	1.5 km	MPC · JPL
773622	2020 BG_{87}	—	January 28, 2020	Haleakala	Pan-STARRS 1	·	2.6 km	MPC · JPL
773623	2020 BH_{98}	—	January 27, 2015	Haleakala	Pan-STARRS 1	·	2.1 km	MPC · JPL
773624	2020 BX_{125}	—	August 18, 2017	Haleakala	Pan-STARRS 1	·	2.2 km	MPC · JPL
773625	2020 CC_{4}	—	February 4, 2020	Haleakala	Pan-STARRS 1	·	2.0 km	MPC · JPL
773626	2020 CW_{7}	—	February 24, 2009	Mauna Kea	P. A. Wiegert	·	2.3 km	MPC · JPL
773627	2020 EF_{1}	—	May 10, 2015	Mount Lemmon	Mount Lemmon Survey	·	2.4 km	MPC · JPL
773628	2020 EV_{2}	—	March 5, 2020	Mount Lemmon	Mount Lemmon Survey	·	2.1 km	MPC · JPL
773629	2020 FN_{14}	—	March 25, 2020	Mount Lemmon	Mount Lemmon Survey	TIR	2.3 km	MPC · JPL
773630	2020 FF_{32}	—	May 25, 2015	Haleakala	Pan-STARRS 1	·	2.4 km	MPC · JPL
773631	2020 FN_{35}	—	November 23, 2014	Haleakala	Pan-STARRS 1	L5	5.9 km	MPC · JPL
773632	2020 GM_{6}	—	January 18, 2016	Haleakala	Pan-STARRS 1	·	800 m	MPC · JPL
773633	2020 GK_{15}	—	May 21, 2010	WISE	WISE	·	2.2 km	MPC · JPL
773634	2020 GT_{15}	—	December 25, 2011	Westfield	International Astronomical Search Collaboration	·	2.9 km	MPC · JPL
773635	2020 GB_{21}	—	November 26, 2009	Kitt Peak	Spacewatch	3:2	4.2 km	MPC · JPL
773636	2020 HG_{19}	—	April 2, 2019	Haleakala	Pan-STARRS 1	L5	6.5 km	MPC · JPL
773637	2020 HQ_{25}	—	October 6, 2012	Mount Lemmon	Mount Lemmon Survey	HOF	1.7 km	MPC · JPL
773638	2020 HH_{27}	—	November 9, 2018	Haleakala	Pan-STARRS 2	·	610 m	MPC · JPL
773639	2020 HX_{28}	—	April 1, 2008	Mount Lemmon	Mount Lemmon Survey	L5	6.0 km	MPC · JPL
773640	2020 HM_{33}	—	December 16, 2014	Haleakala	Pan-STARRS 1	L5	7.4 km	MPC · JPL
773641	2020 HD_{37}	—	April 2, 2019	Haleakala	Pan-STARRS 1	L5	6.2 km	MPC · JPL
773642	2020 HZ_{44}	—	September 22, 2003	Kitt Peak	Spacewatch	·	540 m	MPC · JPL
773643	2020 HT_{45}	—	January 30, 2017	Haleakala	Pan-STARRS 1	L5	7.7 km	MPC · JPL
773644	2020 HL_{61}	—	February 4, 2019	Haleakala	Pan-STARRS 1	EOS	1.6 km	MPC · JPL
773645	2020 HC_{62}	—	September 20, 2011	Haleakala	Pan-STARRS 1	L5	6.8 km	MPC · JPL
773646	2020 HP_{67}	—	April 27, 2020	Haleakala	Pan-STARRS 1	L5	6.5 km	MPC · JPL
773647	2020 HN_{83}	—	September 21, 2012	Mount Lemmon	Mount Lemmon Survey	L5	6.7 km	MPC · JPL
773648	2020 HR_{86}	—	September 27, 2016	Haleakala	Pan-STARRS 1	·	3.4 km	MPC · JPL
773649	2020 HQ_{96}	—	April 19, 2020	Haleakala	Pan-STARRS 2	·	2.2 km	MPC · JPL
773650	2020 HJ_{99}	—	April 21, 2020	Haleakala	Pan-STARRS 2	L5	6.2 km	MPC · JPL
773651	2020 HW_{103}	—	April 22, 2020	Haleakala	Pan-STARRS 1	L5	6.1 km	MPC · JPL
773652	2020 HZ_{103}	—	April 22, 2020	Haleakala	Pan-STARRS 1	L5	6.9 km	MPC · JPL
773653	2020 HB_{104}	—	April 21, 2020	Haleakala	Pan-STARRS 1	L5	6.5 km	MPC · JPL
773654	2020 HS_{105}	—	November 4, 2013	Mount Lemmon	Mount Lemmon Survey	L5	6.5 km	MPC · JPL
773655	2020 HK_{180}	—	September 5, 2000	Kitt Peak	Spacewatch	L5	6.0 km	MPC · JPL
773656	2020 JZ_{6}	—	March 18, 2010	Kitt Peak	Spacewatch	·	530 m	MPC · JPL
773657	2020 JD_{14}	—	April 3, 2019	Haleakala	Pan-STARRS 1	L5	6.0 km	MPC · JPL
773658	2020 JB_{16}	—	May 14, 2020	Haleakala	Pan-STARRS 1	EOS	1.5 km	MPC · JPL
773659	2020 JY_{16}	—	July 8, 2014	Haleakala	Pan-STARRS 1	·	550 m	MPC · JPL
773660	2020 KG_{8}	—	May 24, 2020	Haleakala	Pan-STARRS 1	H	330 m	MPC · JPL
773661	2020 KG_{13}	—	June 12, 2011	Mount Lemmon	Mount Lemmon Survey	·	800 m	MPC · JPL
773662	2020 KU_{29}	—	February 1, 2012	Kitt Peak	Spacewatch	·	2.7 km	MPC · JPL
773663	2020 KQ_{39}	—	November 5, 2007	Kitt Peak	Spacewatch	·	1.4 km	MPC · JPL
773664	2020 KR_{47}	—	October 24, 2011	Haleakala	Pan-STARRS 1	VER	1.9 km	MPC · JPL
773665	2020 LM_{4}	—	January 16, 2015	Haleakala	Pan-STARRS 1	·	780 m	MPC · JPL
773666	2020 LQ_{7}	—	May 5, 2014	Cerro Tololo	DECam	·	2.0 km	MPC · JPL
773667	2020 MT_{4}	—	June 28, 2020	Haleakala	Pan-STARRS 1	H	330 m	MPC · JPL
773668	2020 MB_{5}	—	June 29, 2020	Haleakala	Pan-STARRS 1	H	330 m	MPC · JPL
773669	2020 MB_{8}	—	June 29, 2020	Haleakala	Pan-STARRS 1	L4	6.0 km	MPC · JPL
773670	2020 MG_{40}	—	April 7, 2008	Kitt Peak	Spacewatch	·	2.3 km	MPC · JPL
773671	2020 MR_{60}	—	June 28, 2020	Haleakala	Pan-STARRS 1	PHO	600 m	MPC · JPL
773672	2020 NR_{1}	—	July 14, 2020	Mount Lemmon	Mount Lemmon Survey	H	310 m	MPC · JPL
773673	2020 NX_{5}	—	September 12, 2015	Haleakala	Pan-STARRS 1	·	2.2 km	MPC · JPL
773674	2020 OY_{9}	—	June 20, 2013	Haleakala	Pan-STARRS 1	·	570 m	MPC · JPL
773675	2020 OT_{40}	—	July 20, 2020	Haleakala	Pan-STARRS 1	·	960 m	MPC · JPL
773676	2020 OA_{43}	—	July 30, 2020	Haleakala	Pan-STARRS 1	L4	6.2 km	MPC · JPL
773677	2020 OA_{64}	—	July 17, 2020	Haleakala	Pan-STARRS 1	L4	7.5 km	MPC · JPL
773678	2020 OS_{81}	—	July 22, 2020	Haleakala	Pan-STARRS 1	L4	6.0 km	MPC · JPL
773679	2020 OX_{100}	—	February 28, 2019	Mount Lemmon	Mount Lemmon Survey	·	770 m	MPC · JPL
773680	2020 OP_{108}	—	January 16, 2015	Haleakala	Pan-STARRS 1	·	920 m	MPC · JPL
773681	2020 PU_{9}	—	December 13, 2006	Mount Lemmon	Mount Lemmon Survey	·	940 m	MPC · JPL
773682	2020 PF_{19}	—	September 19, 2001	Kitt Peak	Spacewatch	·	710 m	MPC · JPL
773683	2020 PG_{50}	—	November 17, 2006	Mount Lemmon	Mount Lemmon Survey	·	1.4 km	MPC · JPL
773684	2020 PS_{51}	—	February 20, 2014	Mount Lemmon	Mount Lemmon Survey	L4	5.9 km	MPC · JPL
773685	2020 PN_{53}	—	January 19, 2013	Mount Lemmon	Mount Lemmon Survey	L4	7.0 km	MPC · JPL
773686	2020 QL_{31}	—	August 19, 2020	Mount Lemmon	Mount Lemmon Survey	·	980 m	MPC · JPL
773687	2020 QY_{43}	—	December 18, 2009	Mount Lemmon	Mount Lemmon Survey	V	400 m	MPC · JPL
773688	2020 QB_{50}	—	October 10, 2007	Kitt Peak	Spacewatch	·	1.1 km	MPC · JPL
773689	2020 QW_{65}	—	August 18, 2020	Haleakala	Pan-STARRS 1	L4	7.0 km	MPC · JPL
773690	2020 QU_{67}	—	April 30, 2016	Haleakala	Pan-STARRS 1	L4	5.4 km	MPC · JPL
773691	2020 QV_{83}	—	May 10, 2014	Mount Lemmon	Mount Lemmon Survey	·	1.5 km	MPC · JPL
773692	2020 QX_{83}	—	August 19, 2020	Haleakala	Pan-STARRS 1	L4	6.1 km	MPC · JPL
773693	2020 QG_{84}	—	February 26, 2014	Mount Lemmon	Mount Lemmon Survey	L4 · ERY	5.9 km	MPC · JPL
773694	2020 QN_{84}	—	August 22, 2020	Haleakala	Pan-STARRS 1	L4	6.7 km	MPC · JPL
773695	2020 RT_{28}	—	September 9, 2020	Haleakala	Pan-STARRS 1	L4	5.9 km	MPC · JPL
773696	2020 RB_{45}	—	December 21, 2014	Mount Lemmon	Mount Lemmon Survey	·	570 m	MPC · JPL
773697	2020 RF_{118}	—	March 17, 2015	Mount Lemmon	Mount Lemmon Survey	L4	6.4 km	MPC · JPL
773698	2020 RV_{126}	—	September 12, 2020	Haleakala	Pan-STARRS 1	·	1.2 km	MPC · JPL
773699	2020 RY_{126}	—	February 13, 2013	Haleakala	Pan-STARRS 1	L4	6.1 km	MPC · JPL
773700	2020 SR_{60}	—	November 6, 2016	Mount Lemmon	Mount Lemmon Survey	MAR	770 m	MPC · JPL

== 773701–773800 ==
back to top

Designation			Discovery			Properties		Ref
Permanent	Provisional	Named after	Date	Site	Discoverer(s)	Category	Diam.	Ref
773701	2020 TD_{14}	—	April 5, 2014	Haleakala	Pan-STARRS 1	PHO	790 m	MPC · JPL
773702	2020 TW_{14}	—	September 23, 2009	Mount Lemmon	Mount Lemmon Survey	MAS	550 m	MPC · JPL
773703	2020 TV_{16}	—	September 29, 2005	Mount Lemmon	Mount Lemmon Survey	·	970 m	MPC · JPL
773704	2020 TF_{18}	—	September 10, 2007	Kitt Peak	Spacewatch	L4	6.0 km	MPC · JPL
773705	2020 TO_{21}	—	October 19, 2003	Kitt Peak	Spacewatch	·	900 m	MPC · JPL
773706	2020 TW_{21}	—	October 14, 2020	Haleakala	Pan-STARRS 1	HNS	810 m	MPC · JPL
773707	2020 TS_{24}	—	October 15, 2020	Mount Lemmon	Mount Lemmon Survey	·	1.0 km	MPC · JPL
773708	2020 TA_{59}	—	November 1, 2015	Haleakala	Pan-STARRS 1	·	1.6 km	MPC · JPL
773709	2020 TS_{70}	—	April 12, 2015	Haleakala	Pan-STARRS 1	L4	6.5 km	MPC · JPL
773710	2020 TV_{83}	—	October 8, 2008	Kitt Peak	Spacewatch	L4	5.9 km	MPC · JPL
773711	2020 UC_{12}	—	October 22, 2020	Haleakala	Pan-STARRS 1	·	1.2 km	MPC · JPL
773712	2020 UQ_{12}	—	April 5, 2014	Haleakala	Pan-STARRS 1	·	1.1 km	MPC · JPL
773713	2020 UU_{12}	—	April 28, 2014	Cerro Tololo	DECam	MAR	790 m	MPC · JPL
773714	2020 UE_{56}	—	July 19, 2015	Haleakala	Pan-STARRS 1	·	1.3 km	MPC · JPL
773715	2020 WA_{9}	—	December 13, 2015	Haleakala	Pan-STARRS 1	·	2.3 km	MPC · JPL
773716	2020 WH_{13}	—	December 14, 2010	Mount Lemmon	Mount Lemmon Survey	·	1.5 km	MPC · JPL
773717	2020 XB_{10}	—	November 19, 2007	Kitt Peak	Spacewatch	·	910 m	MPC · JPL
773718	2020 XU_{18}	—	May 18, 2014	Haleakala	Pan-STARRS 1	·	950 m	MPC · JPL
773719	2020 XK_{21}	—	January 17, 2013	Haleakala	Pan-STARRS 1	(5)	1.1 km	MPC · JPL
773720	2020 XE_{29}	—	October 11, 2010	Mount Lemmon	Mount Lemmon Survey	·	1.4 km	MPC · JPL
773721	2020 YR_{3}	—	December 6, 2020	Kitt Peak	Bok NEO Survey	centaur	80 km	MPC · JPL
773722	2020 YD_{10}	—	February 21, 2017	Mount Lemmon	Mount Lemmon Survey	·	1.1 km	MPC · JPL
773723	2020 YJ_{11}	—	October 14, 2010	Mount Lemmon	Mount Lemmon Survey	DOR	1.7 km	MPC · JPL
773724	2020 YJ_{14}	—	March 27, 2016	Mount Lemmon	Mount Lemmon Survey	·	2.3 km	MPC · JPL
773725	2020 YZ_{21}	—	September 16, 2003	Kitt Peak	Spacewatch	·	790 m	MPC · JPL
773726	2020 YN_{22}	—	February 11, 2016	Haleakala	Pan-STARRS 1	EOS	1.4 km	MPC · JPL
773727	2020 YE_{26}	—	January 21, 2015	Haleakala	Pan-STARRS 1	·	2.5 km	MPC · JPL
773728	2021 AN_{31}	—	November 17, 2014	Haleakala	Pan-STARRS 1	EOS	1.1 km	MPC · JPL
773729	2021 BH_{6}	—	April 12, 2011	Mount Lemmon	Mount Lemmon Survey	EOS	1.4 km	MPC · JPL
773730	2021 BJ_{6}	—	December 21, 2014	Haleakala	Pan-STARRS 1	·	2.6 km	MPC · JPL
773731	2021 BM_{7}	—	October 25, 2015	Haleakala	Pan-STARRS 1	EUN	840 m	MPC · JPL
773732	2021 BO_{9}	—	August 22, 2014	Haleakala	Pan-STARRS 1	·	1.0 km	MPC · JPL
773733	2021 BE_{14}	—	January 16, 2021	Haleakala	Pan-STARRS 1	TEL	930 m	MPC · JPL
773734	2021 CM_{19}	—	February 10, 2007	Mount Lemmon	Mount Lemmon Survey	·	1.4 km	MPC · JPL
773735	2021 CP_{19}	—	May 13, 2016	Mount Lemmon	Mount Lemmon Survey	·	2.9 km	MPC · JPL
773736	2021 CV_{22}	—	November 8, 2007	Kitt Peak	Spacewatch	·	2.8 km	MPC · JPL
773737	2021 CW_{22}	—	November 14, 2015	Mount Lemmon	Mount Lemmon Survey	·	900 m	MPC · JPL
773738	2021 CH_{25}	—	March 13, 2008	Mount Lemmon	Mount Lemmon Survey	·	1.2 km	MPC · JPL
773739	2021 CA_{26}	—	November 8, 2008	Kitt Peak	Spacewatch	·	1.9 km	MPC · JPL
773740	2021 CE_{26}	—	March 28, 2016	Cerro Tololo	DECam	·	2.0 km	MPC · JPL
773741	2021 CN_{28}	—	December 29, 2014	Haleakala	Pan-STARRS 1	·	2.0 km	MPC · JPL
773742	2021 CH_{30}	—	April 14, 2010	Kitt Peak	Spacewatch	·	2.5 km	MPC · JPL
773743	2021 CJ_{38}	—	January 24, 2015	Haleakala	Pan-STARRS 1	(1118)	2.6 km	MPC · JPL
773744	2021 CK_{38}	—	January 21, 2015	Mount Lemmon	Mount Lemmon Survey	·	2.6 km	MPC · JPL
773745	2021 CM_{38}	—	January 23, 2015	Haleakala	Pan-STARRS 1	VER	2.1 km	MPC · JPL
773746	2021 CB_{40}	—	March 13, 2016	Haleakala	Pan-STARRS 1	·	2.4 km	MPC · JPL
773747	2021 CF_{40}	—	March 4, 2016	Haleakala	Pan-STARRS 1	·	1.8 km	MPC · JPL
773748	2021 CT_{40}	—	January 20, 2015	Haleakala	Pan-STARRS 1	·	2.1 km	MPC · JPL
773749	2021 CW_{40}	—	January 26, 2015	Haleakala	Pan-STARRS 1	·	2.4 km	MPC · JPL
773750	2021 CG_{41}	—	February 8, 2021	Haleakala	Pan-STARRS 1	·	1.6 km	MPC · JPL
773751	2021 CC_{46}	—	September 3, 2013	Calar Alto	F. Hormuth	·	1.9 km	MPC · JPL
773752	2021 CC_{49}	—	February 10, 2021	Haleakala	Pan-STARRS 1	·	2.4 km	MPC · JPL
773753	2021 DU_{2}	—	January 10, 2008	Mount Lemmon	Mount Lemmon Survey	·	1.2 km	MPC · JPL
773754	2021 DF_{6}	—	February 16, 2021	Haleakala	Pan-STARRS 1	·	2.6 km	MPC · JPL
773755	2021 DF_{7}	—	February 18, 2004	Kitt Peak	Spacewatch	·	1.1 km	MPC · JPL
773756	2021 DU_{12}	—	October 2, 2018	Haleakala	Pan-STARRS 2	·	2.2 km	MPC · JPL
773757	2021 DY_{14}	—	February 17, 2021	Haleakala	Pan-STARRS 1	·	2.3 km	MPC · JPL
773758	2021 DV_{16}	—	September 14, 2013	Haleakala	Pan-STARRS 1	·	1.5 km	MPC · JPL
773759	2021 ET_{5}	—	February 12, 2000	Apache Point	SDSS	·	1.1 km	MPC · JPL
773760	2021 EH_{7}	—	April 2, 2016	Mount Lemmon	Mount Lemmon Survey	·	1.6 km	MPC · JPL
773761	2021 EM_{7}	—	March 6, 2011	Mount Lemmon	Mount Lemmon Survey	KOR	1.3 km	MPC · JPL
773762	2021 EN_{10}	—	January 17, 2015	Haleakala	Pan-STARRS 1	EOS	1.4 km	MPC · JPL
773763	2021 EQ_{11}	—	January 4, 2016	Haleakala	Pan-STARRS 1	EUN	880 m	MPC · JPL
773764	2021 ER_{12}	—	August 31, 2014	Haleakala	Pan-STARRS 1	·	1.5 km	MPC · JPL
773765	2021 EY_{14}	—	October 24, 2014	Mount Lemmon	Mount Lemmon Survey	(11882)	1.3 km	MPC · JPL
773766	2021 EW_{15}	—	January 20, 2012	Haleakala	Pan-STARRS 1	ADE	1.5 km	MPC · JPL
773767	2021 EX_{15}	—	January 20, 2015	Haleakala	Pan-STARRS 1	EOS	1.4 km	MPC · JPL
773768	2021 EF_{21}	—	February 3, 2013	Haleakala	Pan-STARRS 1	V	470 m	MPC · JPL
773769	2021 ER_{22}	—	June 25, 2017	Haleakala	Pan-STARRS 1	·	2.2 km	MPC · JPL
773770	2021 EM_{26}	—	December 10, 2014	Haleakala	Pan-STARRS 1	·	2.4 km	MPC · JPL
773771	2021 EZ_{26}	—	September 17, 2012	Mount Lemmon	Mount Lemmon Survey	·	2.0 km	MPC · JPL
773772	2021 EQ_{32}	—	January 17, 2015	Haleakala	Pan-STARRS 1	·	1.5 km	MPC · JPL
773773	2021 EW_{32}	—	November 26, 2013	Mount Lemmon	Mount Lemmon Survey	·	2.1 km	MPC · JPL
773774	2021 EG_{36}	—	October 5, 2013	Haleakala	Pan-STARRS 1	EOS	1.4 km	MPC · JPL
773775	2021 ED_{37}	—	March 18, 2010	Mount Lemmon	Mount Lemmon Survey	·	2.2 km	MPC · JPL
773776	2021 EQ_{39}	—	January 17, 2015	Mount Lemmon	Mount Lemmon Survey	·	2.3 km	MPC · JPL
773777	2021 ET_{42}	—	February 27, 2014	Haleakala	Pan-STARRS 1	·	600 m	MPC · JPL
773778	2021 EV_{42}	—	October 15, 2018	Haleakala	Pan-STARRS 2	·	1.4 km	MPC · JPL
773779	2021 EM_{45}	—	September 30, 2013	Mount Lemmon	Mount Lemmon Survey	·	2.4 km	MPC · JPL
773780	2021 EO_{45}	—	May 1, 2016	Cerro Tololo	DECam	·	2.6 km	MPC · JPL
773781	2021 FS_{11}	—	March 12, 2010	Kitt Peak	Spacewatch	·	1.9 km	MPC · JPL
773782	2021 FQ_{15}	—	March 17, 2012	Mount Lemmon	Mount Lemmon Survey	·	1.3 km	MPC · JPL
773783	2021 FF_{16}	—	March 10, 2005	Mount Lemmon	Mount Lemmon Survey	·	1.8 km	MPC · JPL
773784	2021 FV_{18}	—	November 23, 2009	Mount Lemmon	Mount Lemmon Survey	KOR	890 m	MPC · JPL
773785	2021 FH_{19}	—	May 28, 2005	Campo Imperatore	CINEOS	·	2.3 km	MPC · JPL
773786	2021 FK_{19}	—	December 26, 2014	Haleakala	Pan-STARRS 1	·	1.5 km	MPC · JPL
773787	2021 FH_{22}	—	March 10, 2016	Haleakala	Pan-STARRS 1	·	2.1 km	MPC · JPL
773788	2021 FR_{22}	—	January 21, 2015	Kitt Peak	Spacewatch	EOS	1.5 km	MPC · JPL
773789	2021 FU_{23}	—	September 12, 2007	Mount Lemmon	Mount Lemmon Survey	·	1.6 km	MPC · JPL
773790	2021 FS_{25}	—	January 22, 2015	Haleakala	Pan-STARRS 1	·	2.5 km	MPC · JPL
773791	2021 FJ_{29}	—	November 8, 2013	Mount Lemmon	Mount Lemmon Survey	·	1.7 km	MPC · JPL
773792	2021 FO_{36}	—	February 12, 2015	Haleakala	Pan-STARRS 1	·	2.4 km	MPC · JPL
773793	2021 FB_{39}	—	February 2, 2009	Kitt Peak	Spacewatch	·	2.4 km	MPC · JPL
773794	2021 FD_{41}	—	December 7, 2019	Mount Lemmon	Mount Lemmon Survey	EOS	1.6 km	MPC · JPL
773795	2021 FF_{41}	—	August 8, 2018	Haleakala	Pan-STARRS 1	·	2.7 km	MPC · JPL
773796	2021 FQ_{45}	—	July 15, 2013	Haleakala	Pan-STARRS 1	HOF	1.8 km	MPC · JPL
773797	2021 FG_{51}	—	March 19, 2021	Mount Lemmon	Mount Lemmon Survey	·	2.8 km	MPC · JPL
773798	2021 FQ_{51}	—	February 13, 2015	Mount Lemmon	Mount Lemmon Survey	VER	2.1 km	MPC · JPL
773799	2021 GN_{11}	—	February 6, 2016	Haleakala	Pan-STARRS 1	WIT	760 m	MPC · JPL
773800	2021 GR_{15}	—	September 17, 2006	Kitt Peak	Spacewatch	VER	2.2 km	MPC · JPL

== 773801–773900 ==
back to top

Designation			Discovery			Properties		Ref
Permanent	Provisional	Named after	Date	Site	Discoverer(s)	Category	Diam.	Ref
773801	2021 GD_{16}	—	April 12, 2016	Haleakala	Pan-STARRS 1	EOS	1.6 km	MPC · JPL
773802	2021 GT_{18}	—	March 9, 2007	Mount Lemmon	Mount Lemmon Survey	HOF	1.7 km	MPC · JPL
773803	2021 GL_{24}	—	October 21, 2012	Haleakala	Pan-STARRS 1	·	2.3 km	MPC · JPL
773804	2021 GP_{28}	—	August 21, 2015	Haleakala	Pan-STARRS 1	·	520 m	MPC · JPL
773805	2021 GU_{34}	—	March 8, 2003	Kitt Peak	Spacewatch	·	1.2 km	MPC · JPL
773806	2021 GW_{35}	—	November 2, 2010	Mount Lemmon	Mount Lemmon Survey	EUN	900 m	MPC · JPL
773807	2021 GD_{36}	—	February 10, 2016	Haleakala	Pan-STARRS 1	·	1.4 km	MPC · JPL
773808	2021 GZ_{37}	—	July 14, 2013	Haleakala	Pan-STARRS 1	·	1.2 km	MPC · JPL
773809	2021 GB_{38}	—	November 24, 2009	Kitt Peak	Spacewatch	KOR	990 m	MPC · JPL
773810	2021 GH_{40}	—	August 31, 2017	Haleakala	Pan-STARRS 1	·	1.6 km	MPC · JPL
773811	2021 GD_{42}	—	April 12, 2013	Haleakala	Pan-STARRS 1	·	1.0 km	MPC · JPL
773812	2021 GT_{42}	—	September 25, 2012	Mount Lemmon	Mount Lemmon Survey	·	2.2 km	MPC · JPL
773813	2021 GP_{44}	—	January 20, 2015	Haleakala	Pan-STARRS 1	EOS	1.4 km	MPC · JPL
773814	2021 GF_{49}	—	December 29, 2014	Haleakala	Pan-STARRS 1	·	2.2 km	MPC · JPL
773815	2021 GO_{63}	—	November 1, 2018	Mount Lemmon	Mount Lemmon Survey	·	2.1 km	MPC · JPL
773816	2021 GP_{63}	—	April 10, 2021	Haleakala	Pan-STARRS 1	L5	5.9 km	MPC · JPL
773817	2021 GP_{65}	—	October 26, 2009	Mount Lemmon	Mount Lemmon Survey	·	1.3 km	MPC · JPL
773818	2021 GY_{72}	—	April 10, 2021	Haleakala	Pan-STARRS 1	L5	5.8 km	MPC · JPL
773819	2021 GN_{73}	—	March 27, 2015	Haleakala	Pan-STARRS 1	·	2.4 km	MPC · JPL
773820	2021 GW_{73}	—	January 26, 2015	Haleakala	Pan-STARRS 1	TIR	2.1 km	MPC · JPL
773821	2021 GA_{74}	—	September 14, 2017	Haleakala	Pan-STARRS 1	·	1.7 km	MPC · JPL
773822	2021 GH_{86}	—	September 13, 2018	Mount Lemmon	Mount Lemmon Survey	·	1.2 km	MPC · JPL
773823	2021 GC_{87}	—	January 29, 2015	Haleakala	Pan-STARRS 1	EOS	1.4 km	MPC · JPL
773824	2021 GE_{90}	—	January 22, 2015	Haleakala	Pan-STARRS 1	·	1.9 km	MPC · JPL
773825	2021 GT_{110}	—	April 9, 2021	Haleakala	Pan-STARRS 1	·	2.2 km	MPC · JPL
773826	2021 GN_{111}	—	April 9, 2021	Haleakala	Pan-STARRS 1	·	2.4 km	MPC · JPL
773827	2021 GO_{114}	—	February 18, 2015	Haleakala	Pan-STARRS 1	EOS	1.3 km	MPC · JPL
773828	2021 GC_{115}	—	February 16, 2015	Haleakala	Pan-STARRS 1	·	1.2 km	MPC · JPL
773829	2021 GF_{115}	—	January 27, 2015	Haleakala	Pan-STARRS 1	·	1.5 km	MPC · JPL
773830	2021 GQ_{117}	—	April 10, 2021	Haleakala	Pan-STARRS 1	·	2.3 km	MPC · JPL
773831	2021 GE_{130}	—	January 20, 2015	Haleakala	Pan-STARRS 1	VER	2.1 km	MPC · JPL
773832	2021 GO_{141}	—	March 12, 2016	Haleakala	Pan-STARRS 1	EOS	1.3 km	MPC · JPL
773833	2021 GM_{167}	—	April 15, 2021	Haleakala	Pan-STARRS 1	·	2.5 km	MPC · JPL
773834	2021 GW_{167}	—	May 5, 2016	Haleakala	Pan-STARRS 1	·	1.9 km	MPC · JPL
773835	2021 GT_{168}	—	August 9, 2013	Kitt Peak	Spacewatch	·	1.4 km	MPC · JPL
773836	2021 GP_{171}	—	March 22, 2015	Haleakala	Pan-STARRS 1	·	2.2 km	MPC · JPL
773837	2021 GJ_{211}	—	January 17, 2015	Haleakala	Pan-STARRS 1	VER	2.0 km	MPC · JPL
773838	2021 GR_{212}	—	September 3, 2013	Haleakala	Pan-STARRS 1	·	1.6 km	MPC · JPL
773839	2021 GX_{222}	—	October 22, 2008	Kitt Peak	Spacewatch	·	2.0 km	MPC · JPL
773840	2021 HK_{7}	—	February 18, 2015	Haleakala	Pan-STARRS 1	EOS	1.4 km	MPC · JPL
773841	2021 HA_{10}	—	January 23, 2014	Mount Lemmon	Mount Lemmon Survey	VER	2.1 km	MPC · JPL
773842	2021 HE_{12}	—	September 20, 2011	Haleakala	Pan-STARRS 1	·	2.9 km	MPC · JPL
773843	2021 HM_{38}	—	November 5, 2018	Haleakala	Pan-STARRS 2	·	1.8 km	MPC · JPL
773844	2021 JN_{22}	—	May 13, 2021	Haleakala	Pan-STARRS 1	L5	7.2 km	MPC · JPL
773845	2021 JW_{32}	—	November 10, 2013	Mount Lemmon	Mount Lemmon Survey	L5	5.9 km	MPC · JPL
773846	2021 JT_{40}	—	September 26, 2006	Mount Lemmon	Mount Lemmon Survey	·	1.9 km	MPC · JPL
773847	2021 JH_{57}	—	January 21, 2020	Haleakala	Pan-STARRS 1	·	2.1 km	MPC · JPL
773848	2021 JJ_{61}	—	May 9, 2021	Haleakala	Pan-STARRS 1	·	2.4 km	MPC · JPL
773849	2021 LG_{12}	—	March 5, 2016	Haleakala	Pan-STARRS 1	·	1.4 km	MPC · JPL
773850	2021 MU_{18}	—	January 14, 2019	Haleakala	Pan-STARRS 1	·	1.4 km	MPC · JPL
773851	2021 ND_{5}	—	March 21, 2015	Haleakala	Pan-STARRS 1	·	1.9 km	MPC · JPL
773852	2021 OV_{22}	—	January 3, 2011	Mount Lemmon	Mount Lemmon Survey	·	3.1 km	MPC · JPL
773853	2021 PQ_{90}	—	March 11, 2008	Kitt Peak	Spacewatch	·	2.4 km	MPC · JPL
773854	2021 PC_{91}	—	September 6, 2008	Kitt Peak	Spacewatch	·	1.1 km	MPC · JPL
773855	2021 QQ_{65}	—	September 24, 2008	Kitt Peak	Spacewatch	L4	6.2 km	MPC · JPL
773856	2021 RO_{32}	—	November 10, 2005	Mount Lemmon	Mount Lemmon Survey	H	360 m	MPC · JPL
773857	2021 RC_{44}	—	July 6, 2019	Haleakala	Pan-STARRS 1	L4	6.2 km	MPC · JPL
773858	2021 RE_{73}	—	October 31, 2010	Mount Lemmon	Mount Lemmon Survey	L4	5.1 km	MPC · JPL
773859	2021 RZ_{83}	—	November 18, 2007	Mount Lemmon	Mount Lemmon Survey	KOR	1.1 km	MPC · JPL
773860	2021 RF_{99}	—	September 11, 2021	Haleakala	Pan-STARRS 2	H	280 m	MPC · JPL
773861	2021 RL_{99}	—	July 28, 2019	Haleakala	Pan-STARRS 1	L4	6.7 km	MPC · JPL
773862	2021 RZ_{118}	—	October 11, 2010	Mount Lemmon	Mount Lemmon Survey	L4	6.2 km	MPC · JPL
773863	2021 RP_{140}	—	October 21, 2009	Mount Lemmon	Mount Lemmon Survey	L4	6.1 km	MPC · JPL
773864	2021 RH_{143}	—	May 2, 2014	Mount Lemmon	Mount Lemmon Survey	·	1.5 km	MPC · JPL
773865	2021 SX_{10}	—	July 4, 2019	Haleakala	Pan-STARRS 1	L4	6.3 km	MPC · JPL
773866	2021 SS_{45}	—	October 14, 2010	Mount Lemmon	Mount Lemmon Survey	L4 · 006	7.3 km	MPC · JPL
773867	2021 SK_{74}	—	November 26, 2011	Kitt Peak	Spacewatch	L4	6.4 km	MPC · JPL
773868	2021 TD_{18}	—	September 30, 2005	Mount Lemmon	Mount Lemmon Survey	·	1.8 km	MPC · JPL
773869	2021 TP_{18}	—	November 6, 2010	Mount Lemmon	Mount Lemmon Survey	L4	6.3 km	MPC · JPL
773870	2021 TY_{34}	—	September 28, 2009	Mount Lemmon	Mount Lemmon Survey	L4 · ERY	5.3 km	MPC · JPL
773871	2021 TW_{42}	—	October 24, 2009	Kitt Peak	Spacewatch	L4	6.0 km	MPC · JPL
773872	2021 UC_{21}	—	October 26, 2011	Haleakala	Pan-STARRS 1	·	430 m	MPC · JPL
773873	2021 UK_{35}	—	October 21, 2008	Mount Lemmon	Mount Lemmon Survey	·	500 m	MPC · JPL
773874	2021 UH_{58}	—	June 16, 2018	Haleakala	Pan-STARRS 1	L4	6.0 km	MPC · JPL
773875	2021 VA_{40}	—	March 13, 2016	Haleakala	Pan-STARRS 1	·	450 m	MPC · JPL
773876	2021 WU_{7}	—	July 13, 2013	Haleakala	Pan-STARRS 1	·	660 m	MPC · JPL
773877	2022 BG_{20}	—	May 27, 2014	Haleakala	Pan-STARRS 1	·	1.2 km	MPC · JPL
773878	2022 DC_{8}	—	February 14, 2016	Haleakala	Pan-STARRS 1	THB	2.6 km	MPC · JPL
773879	2022 EW_{19}	—	January 18, 2012	Mount Lemmon	Mount Lemmon Survey	HOF	1.8 km	MPC · JPL
773880	2022 FZ_{5}	—	January 22, 2015	Haleakala	Pan-STARRS 1	·	620 m	MPC · JPL
773881	2022 GL_{11}	—	June 24, 2017	Haleakala	Pan-STARRS 1	·	2.2 km	MPC · JPL
773882	2022 GZ_{24}	—	October 12, 2013	Mount Lemmon	Mount Lemmon Survey	·	1.9 km	MPC · JPL
773883	2022 HA_{14}	—	September 19, 2006	Kitt Peak	Spacewatch	·	2.2 km	MPC · JPL
773884	2022 JX_{2}	—	December 20, 2014	Haleakala	Pan-STARRS 1	EUP	2.8 km	MPC · JPL
773885	2022 JU_{7}	—	November 26, 2013	Haleakala	Pan-STARRS 1	·	2.3 km	MPC · JPL
773886	2022 KJ_{8}	—	November 1, 2006	Mount Lemmon	Mount Lemmon Survey	HNS	790 m	MPC · JPL
773887	2022 KG_{18}	—	September 27, 2008	Mount Lemmon	Mount Lemmon Survey	·	1.3 km	MPC · JPL
773888	2022 MU_{14}	—	August 31, 2017	Mount Lemmon	Mount Lemmon Survey	·	2.5 km	MPC · JPL
773889	2022 OG_{18}	—	April 24, 2015	Haleakala	Pan-STARRS 1	·	2.3 km	MPC · JPL
773890	2022 QM_{12}	—	January 28, 2015	Haleakala	Pan-STARRS 1	·	2.0 km	MPC · JPL
773891	2022 QE_{60}	—	January 26, 2015	Haleakala	Pan-STARRS 1	·	2.9 km	MPC · JPL
773892	2022 SJ_{21}	—	September 20, 2022	Haleakala	Pan-STARRS 1	centaur	30 km	MPC · JPL
773893	2022 SQ_{29}	—	June 7, 2016	Haleakala	Pan-STARRS 1	·	2.6 km	MPC · JPL
773894	2022 SN_{123}	—	April 3, 2016	Haleakala	Pan-STARRS 1	·	1.3 km	MPC · JPL
773895	2022 TC_{4}	—	October 20, 2007	Kitt Peak	Spacewatch	·	1.2 km	MPC · JPL
773896	2022 UD_{64}	—	October 9, 2007	Mount Lemmon	Mount Lemmon Survey	·	1.4 km	MPC · JPL
773897	2022 UX_{66}	—	August 7, 2016	Haleakala	Pan-STARRS 1	·	1.6 km	MPC · JPL
773898	2022 UD_{94}	—	October 20, 2011	Mount Lemmon	Mount Lemmon Survey	·	1.7 km	MPC · JPL
773899	2023 MF_{5}	—	June 20, 2023	Haleakala	Pan-STARRS 2	L5	5.9 km	MPC · JPL
773900	2023 MT_{5}	—	January 19, 2016	Haleakala	Pan-STARRS 1	·	2.5 km	MPC · JPL

== 773901–774000 ==
back to top

Designation			Discovery			Properties		Ref
Permanent	Provisional	Named after	Date	Site	Discoverer(s)	Category	Diam.	Ref
773901	2023 MS_{8}	—	October 5, 2013	Haleakala	Pan-STARRS 1	L5	6.3 km	MPC · JPL
773902	2023 MS_{19}	—	November 11, 2001	Apache Point	SDSS	L5	5.9 km	MPC · JPL
773903	2023 OM_{26}	—	November 26, 2014	Haleakala	Pan-STARRS 1	L5	6.6 km	MPC · JPL
773904	2023 QM_{86}	—	May 1, 2016	Cerro Tololo	DECam	·	1.5 km	MPC · JPL
773905	2023 RK_{80}	—	September 25, 2006	Mount Lemmon	Mount Lemmon Survey	·	2.4 km	MPC · JPL
773906 Larisaromanova	2023 RY_{151}	Larisaromanova	September 15, 2023	Rio Hurtado	Romanov, F. D.	·	990 m	MPC · JPL
773907	2023 TH_{30}	—	March 21, 2015	Haleakala	Pan-STARRS 1	·	2.3 km	MPC · JPL
773908	2023 TW_{144}	—	October 18, 2009	Mount Lemmon	Mount Lemmon Survey	HOF	1.9 km	MPC · JPL
773909	2024 QR_{14}	—	July 27, 2011	Haleakala	Pan-STARRS 1	L5	6.2 km	MPC · JPL
773910	2024 TV_{15}	—	September 30, 2003	Kitt Peak	Spacewatch	·	1.3 km	MPC · JPL
773911	2024 US_{9}	—	October 23, 2024	La Palma-Liverpool	Romanov, F. D.	·	930 m	MPC · JPL
773912	2024 WC_{5}	—	November 23, 2024	La Palma-Liverpool	Romanov, F. D.	·	1.3 km	MPC · JPL
773913	2024 WC_{21}	—	February 21, 2017	Haleakala	Pan-STARRS 1	·	850 m	MPC · JPL
773914	2024 WO_{44}	—	October 26, 2011	Haleakala	Pan-STARRS 1	·	2.8 km	MPC · JPL
773915	2024 WL_{64}	—	November 23, 2024	La Palma-Liverpool	Romanov, F. D.	·	890 m	MPC · JPL
773916	2024 XN_{11}	—	December 2, 2024	Haleakala	Pan-STARRS 1	critical	930 m	MPC · JPL
773917	1995 MZ_{5}	—	June 23, 1995	Kitt Peak	Spacewatch	·	1.5 km	MPC · JPL
773918	1995 OK_{15}	—	July 25, 1995	Kitt Peak	Spacewatch	·	1.6 km	MPC · JPL
773919	1995 QP_{12}	—	August 22, 1995	Kitt Peak	Spacewatch	·	1.9 km	MPC · JPL
773920	1995 QN_{13}	—	August 25, 1995	Kitt Peak	Spacewatch	·	1.9 km	MPC · JPL
773921	1995 QV_{15}	—	August 31, 1995	Kitt Peak	Spacewatch	GEF	680 m	MPC · JPL
773922	1995 QB_{16}	—	August 31, 1995	Kitt Peak	Spacewatch	·	1.3 km	MPC · JPL
773923	1995 SG_{47}	—	September 26, 1995	Kitt Peak	Spacewatch	THM	1.7 km	MPC · JPL
773924	1995 SX_{60}	—	September 25, 1995	Kitt Peak	Spacewatch	·	1.9 km	MPC · JPL
773925	1995 SC_{67}	—	September 17, 1995	Kitt Peak	Spacewatch	·	750 m	MPC · JPL
773926	1995 SK_{68}	—	September 18, 1995	Kitt Peak	Spacewatch	·	890 m	MPC · JPL
773927	1995 ST_{68}	—	September 27, 1995	Kitt Peak	Spacewatch	·	1.9 km	MPC · JPL
773928	1995 SR_{80}	—	September 30, 1995	Kitt Peak	Spacewatch	·	1.5 km	MPC · JPL
773929	1995 SK_{81}	—	September 22, 1995	Kitt Peak	Spacewatch	·	1.9 km	MPC · JPL
773930	1995 SA_{85}	—	September 25, 1995	Kitt Peak	Spacewatch	·	1.1 km	MPC · JPL
773931	1995 TB_{4}	—	October 15, 1995	Kitt Peak	Spacewatch	·	870 m	MPC · JPL
773932	1995 TC_{13}	—	October 2, 1995	Kitt Peak	Spacewatch	·	1.6 km	MPC · JPL
773933	1995 UP_{33}	—	October 21, 1995	Kitt Peak	Spacewatch	(5)	860 m	MPC · JPL
773934	1995 UT_{33}	—	October 21, 1995	Kitt Peak	Spacewatch	·	1.2 km	MPC · JPL
773935	1995 UV_{53}	—	October 21, 1995	Kitt Peak	Spacewatch	·	1.4 km	MPC · JPL
773936	1995 UP_{59}	—	October 28, 1995	Kitt Peak	Spacewatch	·	1.2 km	MPC · JPL
773937	1995 UT_{68}	—	October 19, 1995	Kitt Peak	Spacewatch	MAR	690 m	MPC · JPL
773938	1995 UP_{75}	—	October 21, 1995	Kitt Peak	Spacewatch	·	1.8 km	MPC · JPL
773939	1995 UN_{76}	—	October 21, 1995	Kitt Peak	Spacewatch	·	1.3 km	MPC · JPL
773940	1995 UX_{78}	—	October 23, 1995	Kitt Peak	Spacewatch	TIR	2.0 km	MPC · JPL
773941	1995 VA_{6}	—	November 14, 1995	Kitt Peak	Spacewatch	·	1.4 km	MPC · JPL
773942	1995 VG_{6}	—	November 14, 1995	Kitt Peak	Spacewatch	·	1.6 km	MPC · JPL
773943	1995 VR_{6}	—	November 14, 1995	Kitt Peak	Spacewatch	·	1.2 km	MPC · JPL
773944	1995 WO_{29}	—	November 19, 1995	Kitt Peak	Spacewatch	·	1.8 km	MPC · JPL
773945	1995 WO_{37}	—	November 22, 1995	Kitt Peak	Spacewatch	·	1.8 km	MPC · JPL
773946	1996 AY_{4}	—	January 12, 1996	Kitt Peak	Spacewatch	·	2.2 km	MPC · JPL
773947	1996 AW_{8}	—	January 13, 1996	Kitt Peak	Spacewatch	·	880 m	MPC · JPL
773948	1996 AY_{9}	—	January 13, 1996	Kitt Peak	Spacewatch	·	1.8 km	MPC · JPL
773949	1996 GN_{10}	—	April 13, 1996	Kitt Peak	Spacewatch	·	1.1 km	MPC · JPL
773950	1996 RK_{10}	—	September 8, 1996	Kitt Peak	Spacewatch	·	2.0 km	MPC · JPL
773951	1996 TV_{43}	—	October 5, 1996	Kitt Peak	Spacewatch	·	2.3 km	MPC · JPL
773952	1996 VC_{14}	—	November 5, 1996	Kitt Peak	Spacewatch	·	1.9 km	MPC · JPL
773953	1997 EX_{16}	—	March 8, 1997	Kitt Peak	Spacewatch	·	1.9 km	MPC · JPL
773954	1997 EH_{17}	—	March 9, 1997	Kitt Peak	Spacewatch	TIR	1.9 km	MPC · JPL
773955	1997 GW_{2}	—	April 7, 1997	Kitt Peak	Spacewatch	JUN	610 m	MPC · JPL
773956	1997 SR_{22}	—	September 29, 1997	Kitt Peak	Spacewatch	·	1.8 km	MPC · JPL
773957	1997 TC_{8}	—	October 3, 1997	Kitt Peak	Spacewatch	EOS	1.3 km	MPC · JPL
773958	1997 WT_{6}	—	November 23, 1997	Kitt Peak	Spacewatch	·	1.5 km	MPC · JPL
773959	1997 WX_{15}	—	November 23, 1997	Kitt Peak	Spacewatch	·	1.4 km	MPC · JPL
773960	1997 YW_{21}	—	December 31, 1997	Kitt Peak	Spacewatch	·	2.2 km	MPC · JPL
773961	1998 SP_{180}	—	July 1, 2014	Mount Lemmon	Mount Lemmon Survey	(194)	1.0 km	MPC · JPL
773962	1998 TB_{4}	—	October 12, 1998	Kitt Peak	Spacewatch	·	890 m	MPC · JPL
773963	1998 TX_{9}	—	October 12, 1998	Kitt Peak	Spacewatch	·	1 km	MPC · JPL
773964	1999 AZ_{14}	—	January 8, 1999	Kitt Peak	Spacewatch	·	1.1 km	MPC · JPL
773965	1999 CB_{141}	—	February 9, 1999	Kitt Peak	Spacewatch	(21344)	1.2 km	MPC · JPL
773966	1999 EU_{7}	—	March 12, 1999	Kitt Peak	Spacewatch	JUN	740 m	MPC · JPL
773967	1999 HO_{13}	—	February 27, 2015	Haleakala	Pan-STARRS 1	·	1.1 km	MPC · JPL
773968	1999 QX_{3}	—	January 22, 2015	Haleakala	Pan-STARRS 1	·	1.5 km	MPC · JPL
773969	1999 RV_{7}	—	September 3, 1999	Kitt Peak	Spacewatch	·	1.2 km	MPC · JPL
773970	1999 RH_{242}	—	April 2, 2016	Haleakala	Pan-STARRS 1	AGN	790 m	MPC · JPL
773971	1999 SQ_{29}	—	September 18, 1999	Kitt Peak	Spacewatch	·	1.3 km	MPC · JPL
773972	1999 TL_{16}	—	October 12, 1999	Ondřejov	P. Pravec, P. Kušnirák	MAR	1.1 km	MPC · JPL
773973	1999 TC_{22}	—	October 3, 1999	Kitt Peak	Spacewatch	·	2.1 km	MPC · JPL
773974	1999 TZ_{44}	—	October 3, 1999	Kitt Peak	Spacewatch	·	1.5 km	MPC · JPL
773975	1999 TU_{49}	—	October 4, 1999	Kitt Peak	Spacewatch	·	1.2 km	MPC · JPL
773976	1999 TP_{50}	—	October 4, 1999	Kitt Peak	Spacewatch	·	870 m	MPC · JPL
773977	1999 TW_{166}	—	October 10, 1999	Socorro	LINEAR	·	650 m	MPC · JPL
773978	1999 TD_{276}	—	October 6, 1999	Socorro	LINEAR	RAF	640 m	MPC · JPL
773979	1999 TT_{303}	—	October 4, 1999	Kitt Peak	Spacewatch	·	1.7 km	MPC · JPL
773980	1999 TG_{339}	—	October 5, 2013	Haleakala	Pan-STARRS 1	·	1.4 km	MPC · JPL
773981	1999 TA_{340}	—	February 4, 2006	Kitt Peak	Spacewatch	·	1.3 km	MPC · JPL
773982	1999 UP_{9}	—	October 31, 1999	Socorro	LINEAR	·	1.5 km	MPC · JPL
773983	1999 UD_{12}	—	October 14, 1999	Kitt Peak	Spacewatch	·	1.0 km	MPC · JPL
773984	1999 UK_{55}	—	October 20, 1999	Kitt Peak	Spacewatch	·	850 m	MPC · JPL
773985	1999 UU_{57}	—	October 29, 1999	Kitt Peak	Spacewatch	EUN	720 m	MPC · JPL
773986	1999 UD_{66}	—	February 5, 2011	Mount Lemmon	Mount Lemmon Survey	·	1.5 km	MPC · JPL
773987	1999 UR_{66}	—	October 14, 2010	Mount Lemmon	Mount Lemmon Survey	·	2.4 km	MPC · JPL
773988	1999 VN_{120}	—	November 4, 1999	Kitt Peak	Spacewatch	·	700 m	MPC · JPL
773989	1999 VH_{210}	—	November 12, 1999	Socorro	LINEAR	·	1.1 km	MPC · JPL
773990	1999 VB_{226}	—	November 6, 1999	Kitt Peak	Spacewatch	·	1.4 km	MPC · JPL
773991	1999 XS_{149}	—	December 8, 1999	Kitt Peak	Spacewatch	·	970 m	MPC · JPL
773992	1999 XK_{232}	—	January 10, 2013	Haleakala	Pan-STARRS 1	·	920 m	MPC · JPL
773993	1999 YA_{29}	—	October 18, 2007	Kitt Peak	Spacewatch	·	840 m	MPC · JPL
773994	2000 AB_{207}	—	January 3, 2000	Kitt Peak	Spacewatch	ADE	1.4 km	MPC · JPL
773995	2000 AX_{259}	—	January 4, 2017	Haleakala	Pan-STARRS 1	·	2.2 km	MPC · JPL
773996	2000 CE_{72}	—	February 7, 2000	Kitt Peak	Spacewatch	·	840 m	MPC · JPL
773997	2000 CA_{139}	—	February 5, 2000	Kitt Peak	Spacewatch	·	890 m	MPC · JPL
773998	2000 CR_{141}	—	February 2, 2000	Kitt Peak	Spacewatch	·	1.9 km	MPC · JPL
773999	2000 CL_{143}	—	February 4, 2000	Kitt Peak	Spacewatch	·	1.1 km	MPC · JPL
774000	2000 CM_{154}	—	September 5, 2008	Kitt Peak	Spacewatch	EOS	1.2 km	MPC · JPL

back to top

== Meaning of names ==
As minor planet discoveries are confirmed, they are given a permanent number by the IAU's Minor Planet Center (MPC), and the discoverers can then submit names for them, following the IAU's naming conventions. The list below concerns those minor planets in the specified number-range that have received names, and explains the meanings of those names.

Official naming citations of newly named small Solar System bodies are approved and published in a bulletin by IAU's Working Group for Small Bodies Nomenclature (WGSBN). Before May 2021, citations were published in MPC's Minor Planet Circulars for many decades. Recent citations can also be found on the JPL Small-Body Database (SBDB). Until his death in 2016, German astronomer Lutz D. Schmadel compiled these citations into the Dictionary of Minor Planet Names (DMP) and regularly updated the collection.

Based on Paul Herget's The Names of the Minor Planets, Schmadel also researched the unclear origin of numerous asteroids, most of which had been named prior to World War II. This article incorporates text from this source, which is in the public domain: SBDB New namings may only be added to this list below after official publication as the preannouncement of names is condemned. The WGSBN publishes a comprehensive guideline for the naming rules of non-cometary small Solar System bodies.

Named minor planet	Provisional	This minor planet was named for...	Ref · Catalog
773258 Corpodean	2018 VW_{131}	Ioan Mircea Corpodean, a Romanian electrician and amateur astronomer.	IAU · 773258
773906 Larisaromanova	2023 RY_{151}	Larisa Viktorovna Romanova (born 1975), mother of the discoverer.	IAU · 773906
