= List of minor planets: 601001–602000 =

The following is a partial list of minor planets, running from minor-planet number 601001 through 602000, inclusive. The primary data for this and other partial lists is based on JPL's "Small-Body Orbital Elements" and data available from the Minor Planet Center. Critical list information is also provided by the MPC, unless otherwise specified from Lowell Observatory. A detailed description of the table's columns and additional sources are given on the main page including a complete list of every page in this series, and a statistical break-up on the dynamical classification of minor planets.

Also see the summary list of all named bodies in numerical and alphabetical order, and the corresponding naming citations for the number range of this particular list. New namings may only be added to this list after official publication, as the preannouncement of names is condemned by the Working Group for Small Bodies Nomenclature of the International Astronomical Union.

Near-Earth obj.	MBA (inner)	MBA (outer)	Centaur
Mars-crosser	MBA (middle)	Jupiter trojan	Trans-Neptunian obj.
Unclassified

== 601001–601100 ==
Designation			Discovery			Properties		Ref
Permanent	Provisional	Named after	Date	Site	Discoverer(s)	Category	Diam.	Ref
601001	2012 TZ_{358}	—	October 6, 2012	Mount Lemmon	Mount Lemmon Survey	·	1.1 km	MPC · JPL
601002	2012 TP_{360}	—	October 7, 2012	Haleakala	Pan-STARRS 1	·	1.4 km	MPC · JPL
601003	2012 TU_{360}	—	October 15, 2012	Mount Lemmon	Mount Lemmon Survey	URS	2.6 km	MPC · JPL
601004	2012 TE_{363}	—	October 8, 2012	Haleakala	Pan-STARRS 1	H	390 m	MPC · JPL
601005	2012 TB_{364}	—	October 8, 2012	Mount Lemmon	Mount Lemmon Survey	·	1.3 km	MPC · JPL
601006	2012 TJ_{369}	—	October 8, 2012	Mount Lemmon	Mount Lemmon Survey	VER	2.1 km	MPC · JPL
601007	2012 TW_{372}	—	October 11, 2012	Mount Lemmon	Mount Lemmon Survey	L5	5.6 km	MPC · JPL
601008	2012 TF_{376}	—	October 11, 2012	Mount Lemmon	Mount Lemmon Survey	·	1.5 km	MPC · JPL
601009	2012 TZ_{377}	—	October 10, 2012	Kitt Peak	Spacewatch	·	1.7 km	MPC · JPL
601010	2012 TB_{378}	—	October 9, 2012	Mount Lemmon	Mount Lemmon Survey	AGN	740 m	MPC · JPL
601011	2012 TD_{378}	—	October 8, 2012	Haleakala	Pan-STARRS 1	·	1.4 km	MPC · JPL
601012	2012 US_{2}	—	September 18, 2012	Kitt Peak	Spacewatch	·	790 m	MPC · JPL
601013	2012 UE_{7}	—	November 7, 2008	Mount Lemmon	Mount Lemmon Survey	(5)	1.1 km	MPC · JPL
601014	2012 UC_{8}	—	September 23, 2012	Kitt Peak	Spacewatch	·	1.6 km	MPC · JPL
601015	2012 UD_{8}	—	October 16, 2012	Mount Lemmon	Mount Lemmon Survey	AEO	1.1 km	MPC · JPL
601016	2012 UN_{12}	—	October 19, 2003	Apache Point	SDSS Collaboration	·	1.6 km	MPC · JPL
601017	2012 UV_{13}	—	October 28, 2008	Kitt Peak	Spacewatch	·	1.3 km	MPC · JPL
601018	2012 UL_{16}	—	November 7, 2008	Mount Lemmon	Mount Lemmon Survey	·	1.1 km	MPC · JPL
601019	2012 UM_{21}	—	October 16, 2012	Mount Lemmon	Mount Lemmon Survey	·	1.7 km	MPC · JPL
601020	2012 UF_{23}	—	September 17, 2012	Nogales	M. Schwartz, P. R. Holvorcem	·	2.2 km	MPC · JPL
601021	2012 UQ_{29}	—	October 17, 2012	Piszkéstető	K. Sárneczky	TIR	2.1 km	MPC · JPL
601022	2012 UG_{33}	—	October 18, 2012	Haleakala	Pan-STARRS 1	PAD	1.4 km	MPC · JPL
601023	2012 UL_{37}	—	March 1, 2009	Kitt Peak	Spacewatch	·	2.7 km	MPC · JPL
601024	2012 UO_{39}	—	September 16, 2003	Kitt Peak	Spacewatch	·	1.9 km	MPC · JPL
601025	2012 UQ_{39}	—	September 23, 2003	Palomar	NEAT	·	1.5 km	MPC · JPL
601026	2012 UZ_{42}	—	September 23, 2012	Mount Lemmon	Mount Lemmon Survey	NYS	750 m	MPC · JPL
601027	2012 UB_{46}	—	October 8, 2012	Kitt Peak	Spacewatch	·	1.1 km	MPC · JPL
601028	2012 UL_{53}	—	October 19, 2012	Mount Lemmon	Mount Lemmon Survey	·	2.1 km	MPC · JPL
601029	2012 UY_{54}	—	July 19, 2006	Mauna Kea	P. A. Wiegert, D. Subasinghe	·	2.0 km	MPC · JPL
601030	2012 UT_{56}	—	October 19, 2012	Haleakala	Pan-STARRS 1	·	1.8 km	MPC · JPL
601031	2012 UC_{59}	—	August 22, 2003	Palomar	NEAT	·	1.3 km	MPC · JPL
601032	2012 UW_{61}	—	October 27, 2008	Mount Lemmon	Mount Lemmon Survey	·	940 m	MPC · JPL
601033	2012 UO_{62}	—	May 24, 2011	Haleakala	Pan-STARRS 1	·	1.9 km	MPC · JPL
601034	2012 UY_{63}	—	September 25, 2003	Palomar	NEAT	·	1.5 km	MPC · JPL
601035	2012 UZ_{64}	—	May 26, 2006	Mount Lemmon	Mount Lemmon Survey	·	2.1 km	MPC · JPL
601036 Sassflóra	2012 UO_{67}	Sassflóra	October 21, 2012	Piszkéstető	K. Sárneczky, G. Hodosán	·	1.2 km	MPC · JPL
601037	2012 UE_{69}	—	December 2, 2005	Mauna Kea	A. Boattini	L5	7.3 km	MPC · JPL
601038	2012 UH_{70}	—	November 7, 2005	Mauna Kea	A. Boattini	·	1.4 km	MPC · JPL
601039	2012 UM_{72}	—	October 29, 2008	Kitt Peak	Spacewatch	·	1.2 km	MPC · JPL
601040	2012 UO_{75}	—	October 18, 2003	Kitt Peak	Spacewatch	·	1.6 km	MPC · JPL
601041	2012 UC_{80}	—	December 31, 2008	Kitt Peak	Spacewatch	PAD	1.3 km	MPC · JPL
601042	2012 UA_{83}	—	October 1, 2006	Kitt Peak	Spacewatch	·	2.6 km	MPC · JPL
601043	2012 UC_{83}	—	October 20, 2012	Kitt Peak	Spacewatch	·	2.4 km	MPC · JPL
601044	2012 UO_{87}	—	October 15, 2012	Mount Lemmon	Mount Lemmon Survey	MAR	920 m	MPC · JPL
601045	2012 UX_{87}	—	September 16, 2003	Palomar	NEAT	·	1.5 km	MPC · JPL
601046	2012 UH_{88}	—	October 20, 2003	Kitt Peak	Spacewatch	·	2.2 km	MPC · JPL
601047	2012 UX_{91}	—	October 16, 2012	Mount Lemmon	Mount Lemmon Survey	·	2.6 km	MPC · JPL
601048	2012 UO_{93}	—	September 17, 2012	Kitt Peak	Spacewatch	·	3.0 km	MPC · JPL
601049	2012 UF_{97}	—	December 6, 2008	Kitt Peak	Spacewatch	·	1.4 km	MPC · JPL
601050	2012 UM_{101}	—	October 18, 2012	Haleakala	Pan-STARRS 1	·	1.7 km	MPC · JPL
601051	2012 US_{104}	—	August 25, 2003	Palomar	NEAT	·	1.9 km	MPC · JPL
601052	2012 UV_{104}	—	June 4, 2011	Mount Lemmon	Mount Lemmon Survey	·	1.7 km	MPC · JPL
601053	2012 UB_{106}	—	February 17, 2004	Kitt Peak	Spacewatch	·	2.5 km	MPC · JPL
601054	2012 UH_{106}	—	August 28, 2012	Mount Lemmon	Mount Lemmon Survey	NYS	910 m	MPC · JPL
601055	2012 UE_{108}	—	October 8, 2012	Mount Lemmon	Mount Lemmon Survey	·	1.3 km	MPC · JPL
601056	2012 UJ_{112}	—	November 1, 2008	Mount Lemmon	Mount Lemmon Survey	·	940 m	MPC · JPL
601057	2012 US_{117}	—	November 2, 2007	Kitt Peak	Spacewatch	·	2.3 km	MPC · JPL
601058	2012 UA_{119}	—	October 24, 2001	Socorro	LINEAR	·	2.5 km	MPC · JPL
601059	2012 UK_{122}	—	October 22, 2012	Haleakala	Pan-STARRS 1	·	1.3 km	MPC · JPL
601060	2012 UH_{125}	—	August 25, 2003	Haleakala	NEAT	EUN	1.6 km	MPC · JPL
601061	2012 UL_{125}	—	October 23, 2003	Anderson Mesa	LONEOS	·	1.3 km	MPC · JPL
601062	2012 UB_{129}	—	February 28, 2009	Mount Lemmon	Mount Lemmon Survey	·	2.1 km	MPC · JPL
601063	2012 UU_{131}	—	October 16, 2012	Kitt Peak	Spacewatch	·	1.7 km	MPC · JPL
601064	2012 UD_{132}	—	November 22, 2000	Haleakala	NEAT	MAR	1.1 km	MPC · JPL
601065	2012 UK_{136}	—	September 29, 2003	Kitt Peak	Spacewatch	·	1.7 km	MPC · JPL
601066	2012 UT_{137}	—	October 8, 2012	Haleakala	Pan-STARRS 1	·	1.6 km	MPC · JPL
601067	2012 UC_{139}	—	October 18, 2012	Mount Lemmon	Mount Lemmon Survey	·	1.7 km	MPC · JPL
601068	2012 UZ_{140}	—	October 18, 2012	Haleakala	Pan-STARRS 1	·	1.3 km	MPC · JPL
601069	2012 UB_{142}	—	October 8, 2012	Haleakala	Pan-STARRS 1	T_{j} (2.96) · 3:2	4.0 km	MPC · JPL
601070	2012 UD_{150}	—	August 25, 2003	Palomar	NEAT	·	1.6 km	MPC · JPL
601071	2012 UU_{152}	—	May 7, 2006	Mount Lemmon	Mount Lemmon Survey	·	1.6 km	MPC · JPL
601072	2012 UG_{161}	—	October 22, 2012	Kitt Peak	Spacewatch	·	2.1 km	MPC · JPL
601073	2012 UJ_{164}	—	October 23, 2012	Mount Lemmon	Mount Lemmon Survey	·	2.3 km	MPC · JPL
601074	2012 UW_{164}	—	October 10, 2012	Haleakala	Pan-STARRS 1	MAR	1.0 km	MPC · JPL
601075	2012 UU_{165}	—	May 23, 2011	Nogales	M. Schwartz, P. R. Holvorcem	MAR	1.2 km	MPC · JPL
601076	2012 UV_{169}	—	October 17, 2012	Haleakala	Pan-STARRS 1	·	3.0 km	MPC · JPL
601077	2012 UF_{171}	—	October 22, 2008	Kitt Peak	Spacewatch	·	1.7 km	MPC · JPL
601078	2012 UJ_{172}	—	October 22, 2012	Haleakala	Pan-STARRS 1	·	4.0 km	MPC · JPL
601079	2012 UT_{173}	—	October 6, 2012	Haleakala	Pan-STARRS 1	HNS	1.1 km	MPC · JPL
601080	2012 UP_{174}	—	October 31, 2012	Haleakala	Pan-STARRS 1	BAR	1.1 km	MPC · JPL
601081	2012 UJ_{175}	—	October 21, 2012	Catalina	CSS	T_{j} (2.99) · EUP	2.8 km	MPC · JPL
601082	2012 UX_{175}	—	December 3, 2008	Catalina	CSS	·	1.6 km	MPC · JPL
601083	2012 UY_{175}	—	October 22, 2012	Mount Lemmon	Mount Lemmon Survey	·	2.6 km	MPC · JPL
601084	2012 UO_{176}	—	July 22, 2002	Palomar	NEAT	·	2.3 km	MPC · JPL
601085	2012 UZ_{178}	—	December 18, 2004	Mount Lemmon	Mount Lemmon Survey	·	1.1 km	MPC · JPL
601086	2012 UK_{180}	—	October 17, 2012	Haleakala	Pan-STARRS 1	·	1.6 km	MPC · JPL
601087	2012 UR_{180}	—	October 22, 2012	Haleakala	Pan-STARRS 1	·	1.1 km	MPC · JPL
601088	2012 UR_{184}	—	October 18, 2012	Mount Lemmon	Mount Lemmon Survey	·	2.1 km	MPC · JPL
601089	2012 UC_{186}	—	October 27, 2012	Mount Lemmon	Mount Lemmon Survey	·	1.7 km	MPC · JPL
601090	2012 UO_{186}	—	October 20, 2012	Haleakala	Pan-STARRS 1	HNS	1.0 km	MPC · JPL
601091	2012 UM_{187}	—	October 19, 2012	Haleakala	Pan-STARRS 1	·	1.7 km	MPC · JPL
601092	2012 UN_{187}	—	February 20, 2014	Mount Lemmon	Mount Lemmon Survey	·	1.1 km	MPC · JPL
601093	2012 UG_{188}	—	October 17, 2012	Haleakala	Pan-STARRS 1	·	1.5 km	MPC · JPL
601094	2012 UA_{190}	—	July 30, 2017	Haleakala	Pan-STARRS 1	·	2.1 km	MPC · JPL
601095	2012 UT_{190}	—	October 18, 2012	Haleakala	Pan-STARRS 1	·	1.1 km	MPC · JPL
601096	2012 UP_{199}	—	October 21, 2012	Kitt Peak	Spacewatch	·	1.5 km	MPC · JPL
601097	2012 UA_{200}	—	October 21, 2012	Haleakala	Pan-STARRS 1	·	1.2 km	MPC · JPL
601098	2012 UU_{200}	—	October 18, 2012	Haleakala	Pan-STARRS 1	(1118)	2.6 km	MPC · JPL
601099	2012 UZ_{200}	—	October 20, 2012	Kitt Peak	Spacewatch	MAR	830 m	MPC · JPL
601100	2012 UC_{202}	—	October 16, 2012	Mount Lemmon	Mount Lemmon Survey	EUN	940 m	MPC · JPL

== 601101–601200 ==
back to top

Designation			Discovery			Properties		Ref
Permanent	Provisional	Named after	Date	Site	Discoverer(s)	Category	Diam.	Ref
601101	2012 UL_{206}	—	October 21, 2012	Haleakala	Pan-STARRS 1	·	1.4 km	MPC · JPL
601102	2012 UP_{206}	—	April 24, 2015	Haleakala	Pan-STARRS 1	KON	1.4 km	MPC · JPL
601103	2012 UF_{213}	—	October 20, 2012	Kitt Peak	Spacewatch	·	1.1 km	MPC · JPL
601104	2012 UU_{214}	—	October 21, 2012	Haleakala	Pan-STARRS 1	·	1.3 km	MPC · JPL
601105	2012 UD_{218}	—	October 18, 2012	Haleakala	Pan-STARRS 1	·	1.1 km	MPC · JPL
601106	2012 UP_{218}	—	October 17, 2012	Mount Lemmon	Mount Lemmon Survey	·	980 m	MPC · JPL
601107	2012 UJ_{226}	—	November 8, 2008	Mount Lemmon	Mount Lemmon Survey	·	940 m	MPC · JPL
601108	2012 UK_{232}	—	October 18, 2012	Haleakala	Pan-STARRS 1	ELF	2.5 km	MPC · JPL
601109	2012 UW_{236}	—	October 22, 2012	Haleakala	Pan-STARRS 1	·	1.2 km	MPC · JPL
601110	2012 UY_{236}	—	October 18, 2012	Haleakala	Pan-STARRS 1	KOR	900 m	MPC · JPL
601111	2012 VN_{5}	—	October 6, 2012	Haleakala	Pan-STARRS 1	·	2.0 km	MPC · JPL
601112	2012 VT_{11}	—	October 31, 2005	Mount Lemmon	Mount Lemmon Survey	·	640 m	MPC · JPL
601113	2012 VE_{18}	—	November 6, 2012	Mount Lemmon	Mount Lemmon Survey	EOS	1.5 km	MPC · JPL
601114	2012 VC_{19}	—	January 2, 2009	Mount Lemmon	Mount Lemmon Survey	HOF	2.2 km	MPC · JPL
601115	2012 VZ_{34}	—	November 19, 2003	Kitt Peak	Spacewatch	·	1.0 km	MPC · JPL
601116	2012 VW_{37}	—	July 22, 2001	Palomar	NEAT	·	1.1 km	MPC · JPL
601117	2012 VJ_{39}	—	July 19, 2002	Palomar	NEAT	·	1.7 km	MPC · JPL
601118	2012 VG_{43}	—	October 29, 2003	Kitt Peak	Spacewatch	·	1.4 km	MPC · JPL
601119	2012 VB_{44}	—	October 27, 2008	Kitt Peak	Spacewatch	·	1.1 km	MPC · JPL
601120	2012 VB_{48}	—	May 2, 2006	Mount Lemmon	Mount Lemmon Survey	·	1.3 km	MPC · JPL
601121	2012 VW_{48}	—	August 25, 2003	Cerro Tololo	Deep Ecliptic Survey	·	1.2 km	MPC · JPL
601122	2012 VE_{53}	—	March 9, 2005	Kitt Peak	Deep Ecliptic Survey	·	1.7 km	MPC · JPL
601123	2012 VZ_{54}	—	November 6, 2012	Mount Lemmon	Mount Lemmon Survey	·	1.9 km	MPC · JPL
601124	2012 VZ_{56}	—	May 24, 2006	Mount Lemmon	Mount Lemmon Survey	HNS	1.1 km	MPC · JPL
601125	2012 VF_{58}	—	April 24, 2006	Kitt Peak	Spacewatch	·	1.5 km	MPC · JPL
601126	2012 VS_{63}	—	October 22, 2012	Haleakala	Pan-STARRS 1	·	1.4 km	MPC · JPL
601127	2012 VL_{66}	—	October 16, 2012	Kitt Peak	Spacewatch	·	1.6 km	MPC · JPL
601128	2012 VC_{70}	—	October 17, 2012	Mount Lemmon	Mount Lemmon Survey	·	1.6 km	MPC · JPL
601129	2012 VE_{76}	—	October 15, 2001	Palomar	NEAT	EOS	2.4 km	MPC · JPL
601130	2012 VA_{77}	—	November 12, 2012	Haleakala	Pan-STARRS 1	H	420 m	MPC · JPL
601131	2012 VV_{80}	—	November 12, 2012	Haleakala	Pan-STARRS 1	·	1.2 km	MPC · JPL
601132	2012 VG_{87}	—	November 21, 2003	Palomar	NEAT	·	1.5 km	MPC · JPL
601133	2012 VR_{88}	—	September 14, 2007	Mount Lemmon	Mount Lemmon Survey	HOF	2.2 km	MPC · JPL
601134	2012 VD_{91}	—	November 14, 2012	Kitt Peak	Spacewatch	·	1.2 km	MPC · JPL
601135	2012 VK_{98}	—	August 25, 2001	Palomar	NEAT	EOS	2.7 km	MPC · JPL
601136	2012 VD_{100}	—	October 22, 2012	Mount Lemmon	Mount Lemmon Survey	·	2.1 km	MPC · JPL
601137	2012 VZ_{100}	—	October 29, 2003	Kitt Peak	Spacewatch	·	1.8 km	MPC · JPL
601138	2012 VF_{102}	—	October 2, 2003	Kitt Peak	Spacewatch	·	1.6 km	MPC · JPL
601139	2012 VT_{102}	—	April 25, 2015	Haleakala	Pan-STARRS 1	EOS	1.4 km	MPC · JPL
601140	2012 VT_{104}	—	October 16, 2012	Kitt Peak	Spacewatch	·	2.6 km	MPC · JPL
601141	2012 VT_{105}	—	December 1, 2008	Catalina	CSS	·	880 m	MPC · JPL
601142	2012 VK_{110}	—	October 21, 2012	Haleakala	Pan-STARRS 1	GEF	960 m	MPC · JPL
601143	2012 VT_{110}	—	February 7, 2008	Catalina	CSS	·	3.8 km	MPC · JPL
601144	2012 VJ_{112}	—	October 19, 2012	Haleakala	Pan-STARRS 1	·	2.8 km	MPC · JPL
601145	2012 VT_{116}	—	November 15, 2012	Nogales	M. Schwartz, P. R. Holvorcem	MAR	1.2 km	MPC · JPL
601146	2012 VU_{116}	—	August 6, 2016	Haleakala	Pan-STARRS 1	HNS	870 m	MPC · JPL
601147	2012 VV_{116}	—	November 7, 2012	Haleakala	Pan-STARRS 1	·	1.5 km	MPC · JPL
601148	2012 VD_{117}	—	November 12, 2012	Haleakala	Pan-STARRS 1	·	1.6 km	MPC · JPL
601149	2012 VX_{121}	—	June 23, 2015	Haleakala	Pan-STARRS 1	·	1.2 km	MPC · JPL
601150	2012 VC_{122}	—	November 14, 2012	Kitt Peak	Spacewatch	3:2	5.0 km	MPC · JPL
601151	2012 VM_{128}	—	November 15, 2012	Catalina	CSS	EUN	1.5 km	MPC · JPL
601152	2012 VB_{129}	—	November 7, 2012	Kitt Peak	Spacewatch	3:2	4.6 km	MPC · JPL
601153	2012 VW_{132}	—	November 4, 2012	Mount Lemmon	Mount Lemmon Survey	·	1.5 km	MPC · JPL
601154	2012 WG_{21}	—	November 6, 2012	Kitt Peak	Spacewatch	GEF	1.2 km	MPC · JPL
601155	2012 WZ_{24}	—	December 16, 2004	Socorro	LINEAR	H	560 m	MPC · JPL
601156	2012 WM_{25}	—	October 26, 2012	Kitt Peak	Spacewatch	·	1.9 km	MPC · JPL
601157	2012 WZ_{27}	—	July 27, 2011	Palomar	Palomar Transient Factory	·	3.5 km	MPC · JPL
601158	2012 WK_{37}	—	June 13, 2015	Haleakala	Pan-STARRS 1	·	1.4 km	MPC · JPL
601159	2012 WX_{39}	—	November 25, 2012	Kitt Peak	Spacewatch	·	1.6 km	MPC · JPL
601160	2012 WB_{41}	—	November 20, 2012	Mount Lemmon	Mount Lemmon Survey	·	890 m	MPC · JPL
601161	2012 WO_{43}	—	November 23, 2012	Kitt Peak	Spacewatch	·	2.6 km	MPC · JPL
601162	2012 WY_{43}	—	November 20, 2012	Mount Lemmon	Mount Lemmon Survey	·	1.7 km	MPC · JPL
601163	2012 XP_{6}	—	October 22, 2006	Palomar	NEAT	·	3.3 km	MPC · JPL
601164	2012 XW_{12}	—	September 19, 2003	Palomar	NEAT	HNS	1.8 km	MPC · JPL
601165	2012 XX_{13}	—	October 19, 2007	Mount Lemmon	Mount Lemmon Survey	HOF	2.3 km	MPC · JPL
601166	2012 XL_{15}	—	November 7, 2012	Kitt Peak	Spacewatch	·	3.6 km	MPC · JPL
601167	2012 XY_{18}	—	September 15, 2006	Kitt Peak	Spacewatch	THM	1.8 km	MPC · JPL
601168	2012 XA_{22}	—	December 13, 1999	Kitt Peak	Spacewatch	·	1.2 km	MPC · JPL
601169	2012 XK_{24}	—	October 22, 2012	Mount Lemmon	Mount Lemmon Survey	·	2.1 km	MPC · JPL
601170	2012 XU_{25}	—	October 22, 2012	Mount Lemmon	Mount Lemmon Survey	MIS	2.2 km	MPC · JPL
601171	2012 XT_{30}	—	December 3, 2012	Mount Lemmon	Mount Lemmon Survey	·	870 m	MPC · JPL
601172	2012 XW_{30}	—	October 14, 2007	Kitt Peak	Spacewatch	·	1.4 km	MPC · JPL
601173	2012 XG_{39}	—	October 10, 2007	Mount Lemmon	Mount Lemmon Survey	·	2.0 km	MPC · JPL
601174	2012 XW_{48}	—	November 7, 2012	Mount Lemmon	Mount Lemmon Survey	·	1.3 km	MPC · JPL
601175	2012 XV_{49}	—	November 19, 2012	Kitt Peak	Spacewatch	·	1.9 km	MPC · JPL
601176	2012 XS_{60}	—	August 27, 2003	Palomar	NEAT	·	1.4 km	MPC · JPL
601177	2012 XP_{64}	—	October 22, 2003	Apache Point	SDSS Collaboration	·	2.0 km	MPC · JPL
601178	2012 XU_{64}	—	September 30, 2006	Mount Lemmon	Mount Lemmon Survey	VER	2.4 km	MPC · JPL
601179	2012 XS_{68}	—	March 17, 2005	Mount Lemmon	Mount Lemmon Survey	·	1.6 km	MPC · JPL
601180	2012 XC_{75}	—	March 17, 2005	Kitt Peak	Spacewatch	·	1.8 km	MPC · JPL
601181	2012 XN_{75}	—	November 11, 2001	Apache Point	SDSS Collaboration	·	2.7 km	MPC · JPL
601182	2012 XC_{76}	—	February 1, 2009	Kitt Peak	Spacewatch	·	1.1 km	MPC · JPL
601183	2012 XE_{76}	—	November 7, 2012	Haleakala	Pan-STARRS 1	HYG	2.9 km	MPC · JPL
601184	2012 XX_{77}	—	November 23, 2012	Kitt Peak	Spacewatch	WIT	780 m	MPC · JPL
601185	2012 XD_{79}	—	April 8, 2006	Kitt Peak	Spacewatch	·	1.6 km	MPC · JPL
601186	2012 XC_{80}	—	December 6, 2012	Mount Lemmon	Mount Lemmon Survey	MAR	770 m	MPC · JPL
601187	2012 XP_{80}	—	December 6, 2012	Mount Lemmon	Mount Lemmon Survey	·	1.4 km	MPC · JPL
601188	2012 XO_{85}	—	December 7, 2012	Haleakala	Pan-STARRS 1	·	1.8 km	MPC · JPL
601189	2012 XS_{87}	—	January 1, 2008	Kitt Peak	Spacewatch	THM	1.5 km	MPC · JPL
601190	2012 XA_{93}	—	December 13, 2001	Palomar	NEAT	·	4.4 km	MPC · JPL
601191	2012 XJ_{102}	—	July 27, 2011	Haleakala	Pan-STARRS 1	HOF	2.2 km	MPC · JPL
601192	2012 XP_{106}	—	June 21, 2012	Kitt Peak	Spacewatch	·	2.8 km	MPC · JPL
601193	2012 XG_{110}	—	November 21, 2003	Palomar	NEAT	·	1.9 km	MPC · JPL
601194	2012 XH_{114}	—	November 5, 2012	Kitt Peak	Spacewatch	·	1.4 km	MPC · JPL
601195	2012 XP_{123}	—	December 9, 2012	Haleakala	Pan-STARRS 1	·	1.1 km	MPC · JPL
601196	2012 XF_{128}	—	December 10, 2012	Haleakala	Pan-STARRS 1	·	2.2 km	MPC · JPL
601197	2012 XT_{128}	—	July 27, 2011	Haleakala	Pan-STARRS 1	·	2.2 km	MPC · JPL
601198	2012 XJ_{130}	—	October 20, 2012	Haleakala	Pan-STARRS 1	HNS	1.3 km	MPC · JPL
601199	2012 XC_{132}	—	January 20, 2009	Mount Lemmon	Mount Lemmon Survey	HOF	2.2 km	MPC · JPL
601200	2012 XH_{132}	—	January 31, 2009	Mount Lemmon	Mount Lemmon Survey	·	2.1 km	MPC · JPL

== 601201–601300 ==
back to top

Designation			Discovery			Properties		Ref
Permanent	Provisional	Named after	Date	Site	Discoverer(s)	Category	Diam.	Ref
601201	2012 XW_{133}	—	January 20, 2009	Catalina	CSS	EUN	1.2 km	MPC · JPL
601202	2012 XG_{136}	—	December 13, 2012	Oukaïmeden	C. Rinner	·	3.1 km	MPC · JPL
601203	2012 XK_{136}	—	October 21, 2003	Anderson Mesa	LONEOS	·	1.7 km	MPC · JPL
601204	2012 XZ_{143}	—	August 26, 2000	Cerro Tololo	Deep Ecliptic Survey	·	1.8 km	MPC · JPL
601205	2012 XC_{144}	—	September 11, 2007	Mount Lemmon	Mount Lemmon Survey	·	1.5 km	MPC · JPL
601206	2012 XY_{148}	—	October 1, 2003	Kitt Peak	Spacewatch	·	1.2 km	MPC · JPL
601207	2012 XZ_{150}	—	December 7, 2007	Bisei	BATTeRS	BRA	1.7 km	MPC · JPL
601208	2012 XY_{155}	—	October 15, 2001	Palomar	NEAT	·	2.5 km	MPC · JPL
601209	2012 XS_{159}	—	December 9, 2012	Haleakala	Pan-STARRS 1	·	1.9 km	MPC · JPL
601210	2012 XQ_{161}	—	May 21, 2015	Haleakala	Pan-STARRS 1	·	1.3 km	MPC · JPL
601211	2012 XT_{165}	—	December 3, 2012	Mount Lemmon	Mount Lemmon Survey	AGN	930 m	MPC · JPL
601212	2012 XA_{166}	—	December 12, 2012	Mount Lemmon	Mount Lemmon Survey	GEF	990 m	MPC · JPL
601213	2012 XB_{167}	—	December 4, 2012	Mount Lemmon	Mount Lemmon Survey	·	1.2 km	MPC · JPL
601214	2012 XF_{167}	—	October 1, 2016	Kitt Peak	Spacewatch	WIT	770 m	MPC · JPL
601215	2012 XH_{168}	—	February 28, 2014	Haleakala	Pan-STARRS 1	·	1.0 km	MPC · JPL
601216	2012 XV_{168}	—	December 8, 2012	Mount Lemmon	Mount Lemmon Survey	·	1.2 km	MPC · JPL
601217	2012 XR_{169}	—	December 12, 2012	Mount Lemmon	Mount Lemmon Survey	·	1.5 km	MPC · JPL
601218	2012 XV_{169}	—	December 3, 2012	Mount Lemmon	Mount Lemmon Survey	VER	2.3 km	MPC · JPL
601219	2012 XB_{170}	—	December 12, 2012	Mount Lemmon	Mount Lemmon Survey	·	2.6 km	MPC · JPL
601220	2012 XQ_{171}	—	December 6, 2012	Kitt Peak	Spacewatch	·	1.2 km	MPC · JPL
601221	2012 XX_{171}	—	December 9, 2012	Haleakala	Pan-STARRS 1	·	1.2 km	MPC · JPL
601222	2012 XC_{173}	—	October 22, 2012	Haleakala	Pan-STARRS 1	·	1.1 km	MPC · JPL
601223	2012 XX_{176}	—	December 8, 2012	Mount Lemmon	Mount Lemmon Survey	KOR	1.1 km	MPC · JPL
601224	2012 XY_{176}	—	December 2, 2012	Mount Lemmon	Mount Lemmon Survey	615	1.3 km	MPC · JPL
601225	2012 YE	—	September 1, 2005	Palomar	NEAT	·	3.5 km	MPC · JPL
601226	2012 YN	—	November 4, 2012	Kitt Peak	Spacewatch	·	1.4 km	MPC · JPL
601227 Ammann	2012 YF_{1}	Ammann	December 18, 2012	Oukaïmeden	M. Ory	L4	7.0 km	MPC · JPL
601228	2012 YY_{5}	—	June 6, 2011	Mount Lemmon	Mount Lemmon Survey	H	490 m	MPC · JPL
601229	2012 YM_{7}	—	December 30, 2005	Catalina	CSS	PHO	830 m	MPC · JPL
601230	2012 YM_{10}	—	December 23, 2012	Haleakala	Pan-STARRS 1	·	630 m	MPC · JPL
601231	2012 YJ_{11}	—	December 23, 2012	Haleakala	Pan-STARRS 1	LIX	2.5 km	MPC · JPL
601232	2012 YN_{16}	—	October 16, 2012	Mount Lemmon	Mount Lemmon Survey	PHO	670 m	MPC · JPL
601233	2012 YY_{16}	—	December 23, 2012	Haleakala	Pan-STARRS 1	·	620 m	MPC · JPL
601234	2012 YD_{17}	—	September 14, 2005	Kitt Peak	Spacewatch	·	520 m	MPC · JPL
601235	2012 YX_{17}	—	December 23, 2012	Haleakala	Pan-STARRS 1	·	1.7 km	MPC · JPL
601236	2013 AK	—	May 19, 2010	Mount Lemmon	Mount Lemmon Survey	·	2.2 km	MPC · JPL
601237	2013 AG_{2}	—	January 3, 2013	Oukaïmeden	C. Rinner	·	2.7 km	MPC · JPL
601238	2013 AU_{9}	—	January 4, 2013	Mount Lemmon	Mount Lemmon Survey	·	1.7 km	MPC · JPL
601239	2013 AW_{9}	—	October 8, 2007	Mount Lemmon	Mount Lemmon Survey	·	1.5 km	MPC · JPL
601240	2013 AU_{13}	—	December 17, 2012	ESA OGS	ESA OGS	·	1.4 km	MPC · JPL
601241	2013 AF_{18}	—	August 31, 2011	Piszkés-tető	K. Sárneczky, S. Kürti	·	2.1 km	MPC · JPL
601242	2013 AT_{18}	—	November 3, 2011	Mount Lemmon	Mount Lemmon Survey	·	1.8 km	MPC · JPL
601243	2013 AY_{20}	—	July 4, 2005	Mount Lemmon	Mount Lemmon Survey	·	2.8 km	MPC · JPL
601244	2013 AL_{23}	—	January 5, 2013	Mount Lemmon	Mount Lemmon Survey	L4	9.5 km	MPC · JPL
601245	2013 AY_{27}	—	December 1, 2008	Kitt Peak	Spacewatch	·	1.7 km	MPC · JPL
601246	2013 AX_{49}	—	December 22, 2012	Haleakala	Pan-STARRS 1	L4	7.4 km	MPC · JPL
601247	2013 AA_{50}	—	March 18, 2009	Mount Lemmon	Mount Lemmon Survey	·	2.3 km	MPC · JPL
601248	2013 AB_{51}	—	January 3, 2013	Mount Lemmon	Mount Lemmon Survey	·	1.6 km	MPC · JPL
601249	2013 AH_{59}	—	January 20, 2009	Mount Lemmon	Mount Lemmon Survey	·	720 m	MPC · JPL
601250	2013 AA_{60}	—	January 6, 2013	Kitt Peak	Spacewatch	KOR	1.1 km	MPC · JPL
601251	2013 AE_{61}	—	January 5, 2013	Mount Lemmon	Mount Lemmon Survey	·	650 m	MPC · JPL
601252	2013 AP_{69}	—	October 10, 2007	Mount Lemmon	Mount Lemmon Survey	DOR	1.9 km	MPC · JPL
601253	2013 AA_{70}	—	August 31, 2007	Siding Spring	K. Sárneczky, L. Kiss	L4	10 km	MPC · JPL
601254	2013 AQ_{70}	—	April 1, 2003	Apache Point	SDSS	L4	7.9 km	MPC · JPL
601255	2013 AC_{71}	—	January 10, 2013	Haleakala	Pan-STARRS 1	L4	10 km	MPC · JPL
601256	2013 AG_{73}	—	January 7, 2013	La Sagra	OAM	·	3.4 km	MPC · JPL
601257	2013 AF_{80}	—	January 5, 2001	Haleakala	NEAT	T_{j} (2.94)	2.7 km	MPC · JPL
601258	2013 AS_{86}	—	October 10, 2007	Kitt Peak	Spacewatch	·	1.1 km	MPC · JPL
601259	2013 AS_{90}	—	May 20, 2005	Mount Lemmon	Mount Lemmon Survey	GEF	1.8 km	MPC · JPL
601260	2013 AA_{101}	—	December 2, 2008	Kitt Peak	Spacewatch	·	2.5 km	MPC · JPL
601261	2013 AF_{105}	—	October 4, 2002	Palomar	NEAT	(32418)	2.3 km	MPC · JPL
601262	2013 AW_{105}	—	January 10, 2013	Haleakala	Pan-STARRS 1	·	2.0 km	MPC · JPL
601263	2013 AM_{109}	—	January 13, 2008	Mount Lemmon	Mount Lemmon Survey	·	1.7 km	MPC · JPL
601264	2013 AE_{110}	—	December 5, 2007	Mount Lemmon	Mount Lemmon Survey	·	1.4 km	MPC · JPL
601265	2013 AY_{113}	—	January 13, 2013	Mount Lemmon	Mount Lemmon Survey	·	2.9 km	MPC · JPL
601266	2013 AB_{116}	—	July 30, 2005	Palomar	NEAT	·	3.3 km	MPC · JPL
601267	2013 AG_{122}	—	January 14, 2013	ESA OGS	ESA OGS	·	2.5 km	MPC · JPL
601268	2013 AE_{125}	—	February 28, 2009	Kitt Peak	Spacewatch	WIT	1.1 km	MPC · JPL
601269	2013 AP_{126}	—	December 8, 2012	Kitt Peak	Spacewatch	·	1.8 km	MPC · JPL
601270	2013 AC_{128}	—	January 7, 2013	Haleakala	Pan-STARRS 1	EUN	1.1 km	MPC · JPL
601271	2013 AD_{129}	—	January 10, 2013	Haleakala	Pan-STARRS 1	L4	9.1 km	MPC · JPL
601272	2013 AT_{129}	—	January 10, 2013	Haleakala	Pan-STARRS 1	L4	9.5 km	MPC · JPL
601273	2013 AV_{131}	—	November 7, 2012	Mount Lemmon	Mount Lemmon Survey	·	1.8 km	MPC · JPL
601274	2013 AT_{135}	—	January 10, 2013	Haleakala	Pan-STARRS 1	L4	6.7 km	MPC · JPL
601275	2013 AV_{135}	—	January 10, 2013	Haleakala	Pan-STARRS 1	L4 · ERY	8.6 km	MPC · JPL
601276	2013 AN_{136}	—	March 26, 2003	Kitt Peak	Spacewatch	·	840 m	MPC · JPL
601277	2013 AA_{137}	—	March 16, 2009	Mount Lemmon	Mount Lemmon Survey	·	1.2 km	MPC · JPL
601278	2013 AJ_{148}	—	September 18, 2011	Mount Lemmon	Mount Lemmon Survey	·	1.5 km	MPC · JPL
601279	2013 AE_{154}	—	January 4, 2013	Cerro Tololo-DECam	DECam	·	1.4 km	MPC · JPL
601280	2013 AQ_{159}	—	February 10, 2013	Haleakala	Pan-STARRS 1	·	2.2 km	MPC · JPL
601281	2013 AZ_{159}	—	August 29, 2006	Kitt Peak	Spacewatch	·	1.3 km	MPC · JPL
601282	2013 AW_{167}	—	October 17, 2010	Mount Lemmon	Mount Lemmon Survey	L4	6.8 km	MPC · JPL
601283	2013 AM_{168}	—	February 10, 2013	Haleakala	Pan-STARRS 1	·	1.3 km	MPC · JPL
601284	2013 AG_{182}	—	March 7, 2003	Socorro	LINEAR	·	510 m	MPC · JPL
601285	2013 AX_{183}	—	January 10, 2013	Haleakala	Pan-STARRS 1	L4	8.2 km	MPC · JPL
601286	2013 AF_{185}	—	November 2, 2011	Mount Lemmon	Mount Lemmon Survey	·	1.6 km	MPC · JPL
601287	2013 AS_{185}	—	January 31, 2009	Mount Lemmon	Mount Lemmon Survey	EUN	1.2 km	MPC · JPL
601288	2013 AE_{189}	—	January 5, 2013	Mount Lemmon	Mount Lemmon Survey	·	1.9 km	MPC · JPL
601289	2013 AP_{189}	—	October 11, 2016	Mount Lemmon	Mount Lemmon Survey	·	2.1 km	MPC · JPL
601290	2013 AS_{189}	—	October 28, 2016	Haleakala	Pan-STARRS 1	·	1.4 km	MPC · JPL
601291	2013 AC_{191}	—	January 9, 2013	Siding Spring	SSS	T_{j} (2.95)	2.7 km	MPC · JPL
601292	2013 AS_{194}	—	January 10, 2013	Kitt Peak	Spacewatch	L4	9.2 km	MPC · JPL
601293	2013 AW_{194}	—	January 5, 2013	Kitt Peak	Spacewatch	L4 · 006	7.1 km	MPC · JPL
601294	2013 AD_{195}	—	January 10, 2013	Haleakala	Pan-STARRS 1	L4	6.6 km	MPC · JPL
601295	2013 AP_{196}	—	December 7, 2012	Mount Lemmon	Mount Lemmon Survey	·	1.2 km	MPC · JPL
601296	2013 AV_{197}	—	January 14, 2013	Mount Lemmon	Mount Lemmon Survey	·	1.6 km	MPC · JPL
601297	2013 AB_{199}	—	January 5, 2013	Kitt Peak	Spacewatch	L4	6.6 km	MPC · JPL
601298	2013 AY_{199}	—	January 10, 2013	Haleakala	Pan-STARRS 1	L4	6.0 km	MPC · JPL
601299	2013 AD_{200}	—	January 9, 2013	Kitt Peak	Spacewatch	L4	6.9 km	MPC · JPL
601300	2013 AU_{201}	—	January 10, 2013	Haleakala	Pan-STARRS 1	L4	6.1 km	MPC · JPL

== 601301–601400 ==
back to top

Designation			Discovery			Properties		Ref
Permanent	Provisional	Named after	Date	Site	Discoverer(s)	Category	Diam.	Ref
601301	2013 BD	—	September 28, 2009	Mount Lemmon	Mount Lemmon Survey	L4 · ERY	6.6 km	MPC · JPL
601302	2013 BF	—	February 27, 2015	Haleakala	Pan-STARRS 1	L4 · (8060)	5.7 km	MPC · JPL
601303	2013 BG	—	December 12, 2012	Kitt Peak	Spacewatch	H	660 m	MPC · JPL
601304	2013 BU	—	October 11, 2010	Mount Lemmon	Mount Lemmon Survey	L4	6.7 km	MPC · JPL
601305	2013 BQ_{1}	—	December 8, 2012	Kitt Peak	Spacewatch	L4	7.1 km	MPC · JPL
601306	2013 BR_{1}	—	December 23, 2012	Haleakala	Pan-STARRS 1	L4 · ERY	5.8 km	MPC · JPL
601307	2013 BT_{1}	—	December 7, 2012	Mount Lemmon	Mount Lemmon Survey	H	400 m	MPC · JPL
601308	2013 BH_{6}	—	September 25, 2011	Haleakala	Pan-STARRS 1	·	2.6 km	MPC · JPL
601309	2013 BG_{12}	—	October 18, 2012	Haleakala	Pan-STARRS 1	·	2.7 km	MPC · JPL
601310	2013 BS_{13}	—	April 29, 2011	Kitt Peak	Spacewatch	·	1.0 km	MPC · JPL
601311	2013 BA_{17}	—	May 23, 2004	Apache Point	SDSS	L4	10 km	MPC · JPL
601312	2013 BF_{17}	—	January 16, 2013	Mount Lemmon	Mount Lemmon Survey	L4	6.8 km	MPC · JPL
601313	2013 BF_{30}	—	September 23, 2011	Haleakala	Pan-STARRS 1	HOF	2.4 km	MPC · JPL
601314	2013 BU_{33}	—	January 17, 2013	Haleakala	Pan-STARRS 1	L4	7.6 km	MPC · JPL
601315	2013 BK_{34}	—	May 4, 2005	Kitt Peak	Spacewatch	·	2.9 km	MPC · JPL
601316	2013 BA_{41}	—	July 31, 2000	Cerro Tololo	Deep Ecliptic Survey	·	1.4 km	MPC · JPL
601317	2013 BV_{41}	—	January 10, 2013	Haleakala	Pan-STARRS 1	L4	6.9 km	MPC · JPL
601318	2013 BU_{42}	—	January 18, 2013	Mount Lemmon	Mount Lemmon Survey	L4	9.0 km	MPC · JPL
601319	2013 BE_{50}	—	January 16, 2013	Haleakala	Pan-STARRS 1	·	1.2 km	MPC · JPL
601320	2013 BK_{50}	—	August 28, 2006	Kitt Peak	Spacewatch	·	1.9 km	MPC · JPL
601321	2013 BM_{51}	—	January 16, 2013	Haleakala	Pan-STARRS 1	L4	6.4 km	MPC · JPL
601322	2013 BC_{52}	—	December 5, 2007	Mount Lemmon	Mount Lemmon Survey	DOR	2.2 km	MPC · JPL
601323	2013 BC_{58}	—	January 5, 2013	Mount Lemmon	Mount Lemmon Survey	L4	6.3 km	MPC · JPL
601324	2013 BA_{61}	—	October 21, 2005	Palomar	NEAT	·	3.3 km	MPC · JPL
601325	2013 BW_{74}	—	January 17, 2013	Haleakala	Pan-STARRS 1	L4	9.8 km	MPC · JPL
601326	2013 BA_{76}	—	October 20, 2011	Haleakala	Pan-STARRS 1	·	2.1 km	MPC · JPL
601327	2013 BE_{79}	—	October 28, 2011	Mount Lemmon	Mount Lemmon Survey	·	1.4 km	MPC · JPL
601328	2013 BE_{80}	—	September 3, 2002	Palomar	NEAT	·	2.3 km	MPC · JPL
601329	2013 BP_{82}	—	September 18, 2009	Kitt Peak	Spacewatch	L4	6.0 km	MPC · JPL
601330	2013 BT_{83}	—	January 16, 2013	Mount Lemmon	Mount Lemmon Survey	·	2.3 km	MPC · JPL
601331	2013 BO_{86}	—	January 16, 2013	Mount Lemmon	Mount Lemmon Survey	·	1.4 km	MPC · JPL
601332	2013 BT_{87}	—	January 17, 2013	Kitt Peak	Spacewatch	·	2.6 km	MPC · JPL
601333	2013 BA_{88}	—	January 19, 2013	Mount Lemmon	Mount Lemmon Survey	HNS	880 m	MPC · JPL
601334	2013 BK_{88}	—	October 19, 2016	Mount Lemmon	Mount Lemmon Survey	615	1.2 km	MPC · JPL
601335	2013 BN_{88}	—	January 22, 2013	Kitt Peak	Spacewatch	TIR	2.1 km	MPC · JPL
601336	2013 BE_{89}	—	January 17, 2013	Haleakala	Pan-STARRS 1	GAL	1.2 km	MPC · JPL
601337	2013 BK_{89}	—	January 17, 2013	Kitt Peak	Spacewatch	TIR	2.3 km	MPC · JPL
601338	2013 BR_{92}	—	January 17, 2013	Mount Lemmon	Mount Lemmon Survey	·	2.0 km	MPC · JPL
601339	2013 BQ_{93}	—	January 17, 2013	Kitt Peak	Spacewatch	·	1.7 km	MPC · JPL
601340	2013 BX_{93}	—	January 18, 2013	Kitt Peak	Spacewatch	L4	8.5 km	MPC · JPL
601341	2013 BP_{94}	—	January 22, 2013	Mount Lemmon	Mount Lemmon Survey	L4	7.6 km	MPC · JPL
601342	2013 BK_{95}	—	January 17, 2013	Haleakala	Pan-STARRS 1	·	1.5 km	MPC · JPL
601343	2013 BV_{99}	—	January 15, 2008	Kitt Peak	Spacewatch	EOS	1.6 km	MPC · JPL
601344	2013 BP_{101}	—	January 17, 2013	Haleakala	Pan-STARRS 1	·	1.7 km	MPC · JPL
601345	2013 CM_{5}	—	February 2, 2013	Mount Lemmon	Mount Lemmon Survey	·	550 m	MPC · JPL
601346	2013 CH_{12}	—	January 9, 2013	Kitt Peak	Spacewatch	·	1.4 km	MPC · JPL
601347	2013 CH_{13}	—	September 11, 2007	Mount Lemmon	Mount Lemmon Survey	L4	10 km	MPC · JPL
601348	2013 CP_{15}	—	January 31, 2008	Mount Lemmon	Mount Lemmon Survey	·	1.2 km	MPC · JPL
601349	2013 CW_{20}	—	February 9, 2008	Kitt Peak	Spacewatch	EOS	1.5 km	MPC · JPL
601350	2013 CC_{23}	—	February 1, 2013	Kitt Peak	Spacewatch	T_{j} (2.97)	2.3 km	MPC · JPL
601351	2013 CL_{26}	—	February 3, 2013	Haleakala	Pan-STARRS 1	L4	7.4 km	MPC · JPL
601352	2013 CX_{28}	—	January 6, 2013	Kitt Peak	Spacewatch	L4	7.5 km	MPC · JPL
601353	2013 CA_{29}	—	February 5, 2013	Oukaïmeden	C. Rinner	·	1.7 km	MPC · JPL
601354	2013 CJ_{29}	—	February 5, 2013	Calar Alto	Mottola, S.	·	2.0 km	MPC · JPL
601355	2013 CG_{31}	—	October 1, 2005	Mount Lemmon	Mount Lemmon Survey	·	480 m	MPC · JPL
601356	2013 CD_{32}	—	January 20, 2013	Mount Lemmon	Mount Lemmon Survey	(5)	1.0 km	MPC · JPL
601357	2013 CC_{37}	—	August 24, 2011	Haleakala	Pan-STARRS 1	·	2.5 km	MPC · JPL
601358	2013 CL_{38}	—	February 6, 2013	Catalina	CSS	·	2.8 km	MPC · JPL
601359	2013 CW_{50}	—	January 10, 2013	Haleakala	Pan-STARRS 1	·	1.5 km	MPC · JPL
601360	2013 CA_{51}	—	January 10, 2013	Haleakala	Pan-STARRS 1	L4	7.7 km	MPC · JPL
601361	2013 CW_{51}	—	August 13, 2010	Kitt Peak	Spacewatch	·	2.2 km	MPC · JPL
601362	2013 CH_{54}	—	August 24, 2005	Palomar	NEAT	·	3.6 km	MPC · JPL
601363	2013 CP_{55}	—	August 12, 2002	Cerro Tololo	Deep Ecliptic Survey	·	1.8 km	MPC · JPL
601364	2013 CM_{56}	—	February 8, 2013	Haleakala	Pan-STARRS 1	·	910 m	MPC · JPL
601365	2013 CF_{58}	—	March 12, 2008	Kitt Peak	Spacewatch	·	2.3 km	MPC · JPL
601366	2013 CA_{60}	—	January 19, 2013	Kitt Peak	Spacewatch	BRA	1.0 km	MPC · JPL
601367	2013 CU_{63}	—	October 25, 2011	Haleakala	Pan-STARRS 1	·	2.1 km	MPC · JPL
601368	2013 CN_{64}	—	March 1, 2009	Kitt Peak	Spacewatch	·	1.1 km	MPC · JPL
601369	2013 CB_{65}	—	February 8, 2013	Haleakala	Pan-STARRS 1	EOS	1.7 km	MPC · JPL
601370	2013 CK_{70}	—	January 6, 2013	Kitt Peak	Spacewatch	·	1.3 km	MPC · JPL
601371	2013 CT_{75}	—	September 6, 2010	Piszkés-tető	K. Sárneczky, Z. Kuli	·	3.4 km	MPC · JPL
601372	2013 CR_{76}	—	March 18, 2010	Mount Lemmon	Mount Lemmon Survey	·	500 m	MPC · JPL
601373	2013 CM_{78}	—	February 8, 2013	Haleakala	Pan-STARRS 1	·	510 m	MPC · JPL
601374	2013 CO_{80}	—	March 29, 2009	Catalina	CSS	·	1.2 km	MPC · JPL
601375	2013 CF_{90}	—	January 19, 2013	Kitt Peak	Spacewatch	·	730 m	MPC · JPL
601376	2013 CV_{97}	—	December 26, 2011	Kitt Peak	Spacewatch	L4	8.0 km	MPC · JPL
601377	2013 CF_{107}	—	February 9, 2013	Haleakala	Pan-STARRS 1	L4	6.4 km	MPC · JPL
601378	2013 CS_{112}	—	January 20, 2013	Kitt Peak	Spacewatch	·	1.7 km	MPC · JPL
601379	2013 CV_{113}	—	January 17, 2013	Haleakala	Pan-STARRS 1	·	550 m	MPC · JPL
601380	2013 CE_{115}	—	March 24, 2003	Kitt Peak	Spacewatch	·	520 m	MPC · JPL
601381	2013 CC_{116}	—	February 5, 2013	Kitt Peak	Spacewatch	·	2.3 km	MPC · JPL
601382	2013 CK_{117}	—	March 6, 2008	Bergisch Gladbach	W. Bickel	·	1.5 km	MPC · JPL
601383	2013 CR_{119}	—	February 8, 2013	Kitt Peak	Spacewatch	·	1.9 km	MPC · JPL
601384	2013 CT_{127}	—	October 26, 2011	Haleakala	Pan-STARRS 1	·	2.3 km	MPC · JPL
601385	2013 CG_{131}	—	February 1, 2013	Kitt Peak	Spacewatch	·	530 m	MPC · JPL
601386	2013 CW_{131}	—	March 6, 2008	Mount Lemmon	Mount Lemmon Survey	·	1.9 km	MPC · JPL
601387	2013 CN_{142}	—	September 23, 2011	Haleakala	Pan-STARRS 1	AGN	1.1 km	MPC · JPL
601388	2013 CX_{145}	—	September 26, 2011	Mount Lemmon	Mount Lemmon Survey	·	900 m	MPC · JPL
601389	2013 CA_{146}	—	January 14, 2008	Kitt Peak	Spacewatch	AGN	1.2 km	MPC · JPL
601390	2013 CE_{146}	—	October 1, 2005	Mount Lemmon	Mount Lemmon Survey	·	470 m	MPC · JPL
601391	2013 CJ_{149}	—	January 9, 2013	Mount Lemmon	Mount Lemmon Survey	·	2.1 km	MPC · JPL
601392	2013 CU_{152}	—	December 27, 2011	Kitt Peak	Spacewatch	L4	6.6 km	MPC · JPL
601393	2013 CG_{155}	—	January 19, 2013	Mount Lemmon	Mount Lemmon Survey	·	1.7 km	MPC · JPL
601394	2013 CN_{157}	—	October 10, 2008	Mount Lemmon	Mount Lemmon Survey	L4	6.7 km	MPC · JPL
601395	2013 CR_{157}	—	September 30, 2006	Mount Lemmon	Mount Lemmon Survey	KOR	1.3 km	MPC · JPL
601396	2013 CL_{161}	—	February 14, 2013	Haleakala	Pan-STARRS 1	GEF	890 m	MPC · JPL
601397	2013 CX_{167}	—	February 3, 2013	Haleakala	Pan-STARRS 1	L4	6.3 km	MPC · JPL
601398	2013 CR_{170}	—	February 15, 2013	Haleakala	Pan-STARRS 1	·	530 m	MPC · JPL
601399	2013 CK_{173}	—	January 9, 2013	Mount Lemmon	Mount Lemmon Survey	·	2.6 km	MPC · JPL
601400	2013 CX_{175}	—	February 15, 2013	Haleakala	Pan-STARRS 1	·	2.3 km	MPC · JPL

== 601401–601500 ==
back to top

Designation			Discovery			Properties		Ref
Permanent	Provisional	Named after	Date	Site	Discoverer(s)	Category	Diam.	Ref
601401	2013 CB_{176}	—	April 25, 2003	Kitt Peak	Spacewatch	·	2.0 km	MPC · JPL
601402	2013 CU_{176}	—	January 21, 2004	Socorro	LINEAR	·	2.1 km	MPC · JPL
601403	2013 CW_{176}	—	September 19, 2009	Kitt Peak	Spacewatch	L4	7.9 km	MPC · JPL
601404	2013 CO_{178}	—	February 9, 2013	Haleakala	Pan-STARRS 1	·	2.2 km	MPC · JPL
601405	2013 CP_{178}	—	November 27, 2000	Haleakala	NEAT	THB	3.4 km	MPC · JPL
601406	2013 CK_{180}	—	January 15, 2004	Kitt Peak	Spacewatch	EUN	1.4 km	MPC · JPL
601407	2013 CM_{192}	—	February 13, 2013	Elena Remote	Oreshko, A.	·	3.4 km	MPC · JPL
601408	2013 CS_{194}	—	September 23, 2008	Mount Lemmon	Mount Lemmon Survey	L4 · (222861)	7.1 km	MPC · JPL
601409	2013 CJ_{196}	—	February 9, 2013	Haleakala	Pan-STARRS 1	·	1.7 km	MPC · JPL
601410	2013 CP_{196}	—	December 10, 2010	Mount Lemmon	Mount Lemmon Survey	L4	6.6 km	MPC · JPL
601411	2013 CY_{197}	—	December 29, 2011	Mount Lemmon	Mount Lemmon Survey	L4	8.5 km	MPC · JPL
601412	2013 CQ_{198}	—	September 12, 2007	Mount Lemmon	Mount Lemmon Survey	·	820 m	MPC · JPL
601413	2013 CT_{198}	—	February 15, 2013	Haleakala	Pan-STARRS 1	·	2.4 km	MPC · JPL
601414	2013 CM_{199}	—	April 5, 2000	Kitt Peak	Spacewatch	·	1.6 km	MPC · JPL
601415	2013 CG_{200}	—	February 9, 2013	Haleakala	Pan-STARRS 1	·	1.7 km	MPC · JPL
601416	2013 CB_{204}	—	January 19, 2013	Kitt Peak	Spacewatch	L4	6.8 km	MPC · JPL
601417	2013 CU_{211}	—	September 19, 1995	Kitt Peak	Spacewatch	·	1.5 km	MPC · JPL
601418	2013 CC_{213}	—	January 25, 2006	Kitt Peak	Spacewatch	·	620 m	MPC · JPL
601419	2013 CF_{213}	—	April 1, 2003	Apache Point	SDSS Collaboration	·	1.9 km	MPC · JPL
601420	2013 CX_{216}	—	March 5, 2008	Kitt Peak	Spacewatch	·	1.8 km	MPC · JPL
601421	2013 CV_{218}	—	February 8, 2013	Haleakala	Pan-STARRS 1	·	1.5 km	MPC · JPL
601422	2013 CO_{220}	—	March 18, 2010	Mount Lemmon	Mount Lemmon Survey	·	670 m	MPC · JPL
601423	2013 CB_{221}	—	October 24, 2008	Kitt Peak	Spacewatch	·	500 m	MPC · JPL
601424	2013 CK_{223}	—	February 8, 2013	Haleakala	Pan-STARRS 1	L4	5.5 km	MPC · JPL
601425	2013 CO_{223}	—	November 10, 2010	Mount Lemmon	Mount Lemmon Survey	L4	7.0 km	MPC · JPL
601426	2013 CN_{229}	—	February 7, 2008	Mount Lemmon	Mount Lemmon Survey	·	1.4 km	MPC · JPL
601427	2013 CU_{230}	—	February 8, 2013	Haleakala	Pan-STARRS 1	·	1.7 km	MPC · JPL
601428	2013 CU_{232}	—	February 3, 2013	Haleakala	Pan-STARRS 1	(194)	870 m	MPC · JPL
601429	2013 CP_{233}	—	September 23, 2015	Haleakala	Pan-STARRS 1	·	1.6 km	MPC · JPL
601430	2013 CR_{233}	—	July 23, 2015	Haleakala	Pan-STARRS 1	·	1.8 km	MPC · JPL
601431	2013 CK_{234}	—	February 15, 2013	Haleakala	Pan-STARRS 1	·	2.1 km	MPC · JPL
601432	2013 CZ_{234}	—	February 6, 2013	Kitt Peak	Spacewatch	·	2.8 km	MPC · JPL
601433	2013 CX_{235}	—	April 2, 2016	Haleakala	Pan-STARRS 1	L4	9.2 km	MPC · JPL
601434	2013 CF_{236}	—	April 3, 2016	Haleakala	Pan-STARRS 1	L4	6.5 km	MPC · JPL
601435	2013 CW_{236}	—	May 4, 2014	Haleakala	Pan-STARRS 1	·	1.5 km	MPC · JPL
601436	2013 CS_{237}	—	May 11, 2016	Mount Lemmon	Mount Lemmon Survey	L4	6.7 km	MPC · JPL
601437	2013 CE_{239}	—	February 13, 2013	Haleakala	Pan-STARRS 1	·	2.0 km	MPC · JPL
601438	2013 CG_{239}	—	February 14, 2013	Mount Lemmon	Mount Lemmon Survey	L4	6.9 km	MPC · JPL
601439	2013 CD_{240}	—	February 8, 2013	Haleakala	Pan-STARRS 1	·	1.8 km	MPC · JPL
601440	2013 CW_{240}	—	February 8, 2013	Haleakala	Pan-STARRS 1	·	1.7 km	MPC · JPL
601441	2013 CK_{243}	—	February 5, 2013	Kitt Peak	Spacewatch	L4	7.1 km	MPC · JPL
601442	2013 CM_{244}	—	February 3, 2013	Haleakala	Pan-STARRS 1	L4	7.3 km	MPC · JPL
601443	2013 CR_{244}	—	February 9, 2013	Haleakala	Pan-STARRS 1	L4	6.7 km	MPC · JPL
601444	2013 CK_{245}	—	February 15, 2013	ESA OGS	ESA OGS	EOS	1.5 km	MPC · JPL
601445	2013 CB_{246}	—	February 14, 2013	Haleakala	Pan-STARRS 1	·	1.3 km	MPC · JPL
601446	2013 CA_{248}	—	February 15, 2013	Haleakala	Pan-STARRS 1	L4	5.9 km	MPC · JPL
601447	2013 CS_{248}	—	February 5, 2013	Kitt Peak	Spacewatch	·	1.4 km	MPC · JPL
601448	2013 CG_{252}	—	February 14, 2013	ESA OGS	ESA OGS	·	1.4 km	MPC · JPL
601449	2013 DX_{14}	—	August 28, 2011	Haleakala	Pan-STARRS 1	H	520 m	MPC · JPL
601450	2013 DK_{16}	—	January 17, 2004	Palomar	NEAT	526	2.8 km	MPC · JPL
601451	2013 DA_{19}	—	February 16, 2013	Mount Lemmon	Mount Lemmon Survey	·	2.2 km	MPC · JPL
601452	2013 DO_{19}	—	February 17, 2013	Mount Lemmon	Mount Lemmon Survey	·	2.0 km	MPC · JPL
601453	2013 DU_{20}	—	February 18, 2013	Kitt Peak	Spacewatch	·	1.5 km	MPC · JPL
601454	2013 DT_{21}	—	February 16, 2013	Mount Lemmon	Mount Lemmon Survey	L4	7.5 km	MPC · JPL
601455	2013 EN_{15}	—	September 17, 2010	Mount Lemmon	Mount Lemmon Survey	·	2.4 km	MPC · JPL
601456	2013 EC_{22}	—	January 23, 2006	Mount Lemmon	Mount Lemmon Survey	·	500 m	MPC · JPL
601457	2013 EU_{23}	—	March 7, 2013	Haleakala	Pan-STARRS 1	H	360 m	MPC · JPL
601458	2013 EL_{25}	—	March 7, 2013	Kitt Peak	Spacewatch	·	3.5 km	MPC · JPL
601459	2013 EF_{26}	—	September 16, 2004	Kitt Peak	Spacewatch	·	2.1 km	MPC · JPL
601460	2013 ED_{27}	—	April 30, 2008	Mount Lemmon	Mount Lemmon Survey	·	2.0 km	MPC · JPL
601461	2013 EP_{32}	—	November 24, 2011	Haleakala	Pan-STARRS 1	·	2.0 km	MPC · JPL
601462	2013 ER_{38}	—	February 28, 2008	Kitt Peak	Spacewatch	EOS	1.8 km	MPC · JPL
601463	2013 ET_{38}	—	January 1, 2012	Mount Lemmon	Mount Lemmon Survey	·	2.2 km	MPC · JPL
601464	2013 EM_{39}	—	March 8, 2013	Haleakala	Pan-STARRS 1	·	1.5 km	MPC · JPL
601465	2013 EZ_{44}	—	March 6, 2013	Haleakala	Pan-STARRS 1	·	2.1 km	MPC · JPL
601466	2013 EX_{50}	—	February 9, 2013	Haleakala	Pan-STARRS 1	·	570 m	MPC · JPL
601467	2013 ED_{53}	—	September 17, 2010	Kitt Peak	Spacewatch	·	2.3 km	MPC · JPL
601468	2013 EL_{54}	—	March 8, 2013	Haleakala	Pan-STARRS 1	·	1.8 km	MPC · JPL
601469	2013 EX_{56}	—	September 17, 2010	Mount Lemmon	Mount Lemmon Survey	·	1.9 km	MPC · JPL
601470	2013 EB_{57}	—	March 8, 2013	Haleakala	Pan-STARRS 1	EOS	1.4 km	MPC · JPL
601471	2013 EJ_{63}	—	September 17, 2010	Mount Lemmon	Mount Lemmon Survey	·	2.5 km	MPC · JPL
601472	2013 EX_{66}	—	March 11, 2013	Palomar	Palomar Transient Factory	T_{j} (2.98)	2.3 km	MPC · JPL
601473	2013 EW_{67}	—	March 12, 2013	Mount Lemmon	Mount Lemmon Survey	·	2.3 km	MPC · JPL
601474	2013 EM_{71}	—	September 2, 2010	Mount Lemmon	Mount Lemmon Survey	·	1.8 km	MPC · JPL
601475	2013 ED_{75}	—	February 14, 2013	Haleakala	Pan-STARRS 1	·	2.0 km	MPC · JPL
601476 Scharun	2013 EH_{78}	Scharun	March 8, 2013	Haleakala	Pan-STARRS 1	·	2.1 km	MPC · JPL
601477	2013 EK_{79}	—	March 8, 2013	Haleakala	Pan-STARRS 1	THM	1.7 km	MPC · JPL
601478	2013 EW_{79}	—	March 8, 2013	Haleakala	Pan-STARRS 1	·	1.8 km	MPC · JPL
601479	2013 EX_{80}	—	March 3, 2013	Kitt Peak	Spacewatch	T_{j} (2.96)	3.0 km	MPC · JPL
601480	2013 EG_{81}	—	February 17, 2013	Mount Lemmon	Mount Lemmon Survey	·	1.7 km	MPC · JPL
601481	2013 EK_{84}	—	March 8, 2013	Haleakala	Pan-STARRS 1	EOS	1.5 km	MPC · JPL
601482	2013 EG_{87}	—	August 29, 2009	Kitt Peak	Spacewatch	·	2.6 km	MPC · JPL
601483	2013 ES_{87}	—	March 12, 2013	Palomar	Palomar Transient Factory	·	2.1 km	MPC · JPL
601484	2013 EH_{94}	—	May 31, 2010	Catalina	CSS	·	780 m	MPC · JPL
601485	2013 EZ_{103}	—	February 18, 2013	Catalina	CSS	·	2.0 km	MPC · JPL
601486	2013 EP_{108}	—	May 2, 2003	Kitt Peak	Spacewatch	·	1.9 km	MPC · JPL
601487	2013 EU_{110}	—	October 22, 2003	Apache Point	SDSS Collaboration	·	4.2 km	MPC · JPL
601488	2013 EC_{111}	—	March 13, 2013	Palomar	Palomar Transient Factory	·	820 m	MPC · JPL
601489	2013 EM_{113}	—	May 9, 2002	Palomar	NEAT	EUP	2.6 km	MPC · JPL
601490	2013 EW_{116}	—	February 14, 2013	Haleakala	Pan-STARRS 1	·	2.5 km	MPC · JPL
601491	2013 EY_{118}	—	February 15, 2013	Haleakala	Pan-STARRS 1	·	3.0 km	MPC · JPL
601492	2013 ES_{119}	—	March 30, 2003	Kitt Peak	Deep Ecliptic Survey	·	570 m	MPC · JPL
601493	2013 EN_{124}	—	March 13, 2013	Palomar	Palomar Transient Factory	·	2.4 km	MPC · JPL
601494	2013 EJ_{126}	—	March 15, 2013	Mount Lemmon	Mount Lemmon Survey	VER	2.2 km	MPC · JPL
601495	2013 EZ_{126}	—	March 11, 2013	Nogales	M. Schwartz, P. R. Holvorcem	·	3.1 km	MPC · JPL
601496	2013 EU_{132}	—	February 27, 2006	Kitt Peak	Spacewatch	·	530 m	MPC · JPL
601497	2013 EJ_{138}	—	February 14, 2013	Mount Lemmon	Mount Lemmon Survey	·	1.4 km	MPC · JPL
601498	2013 ER_{138}	—	April 9, 2010	Mount Lemmon	Mount Lemmon Survey	·	580 m	MPC · JPL
601499	2013 EZ_{145}	—	September 28, 2009	Mount Lemmon	Mount Lemmon Survey	L4	5.8 km	MPC · JPL
601500	2013 ET_{146}	—	April 15, 2008	Mount Lemmon	Mount Lemmon Survey	·	2.0 km	MPC · JPL

== 601501–601600 ==
back to top

Designation			Discovery			Properties		Ref
Permanent	Provisional	Named after	Date	Site	Discoverer(s)	Category	Diam.	Ref
601501	2013 EO_{155}	—	March 13, 2013	Kitt Peak	Spacewatch	·	2.3 km	MPC · JPL
601502	2013 EH_{159}	—	October 10, 2015	Oukaïmeden	M. Ory	·	3.5 km	MPC · JPL
601503	2013 EL_{160}	—	January 10, 2007	Kitt Peak	Spacewatch	EOS	1.7 km	MPC · JPL
601504	2013 ER_{163}	—	March 5, 2013	Mount Lemmon	Mount Lemmon Survey	·	1.9 km	MPC · JPL
601505	2013 EG_{167}	—	March 14, 2013	Kitt Peak	Spacewatch	·	1.0 km	MPC · JPL
601506	2013 EL_{167}	—	October 29, 2008	Kitt Peak	Spacewatch	·	710 m	MPC · JPL
601507	2013 ES_{168}	—	March 13, 2013	Haleakala	Pan-STARRS 1	EOS	1.2 km	MPC · JPL
601508	2013 ET_{168}	—	March 5, 2013	Mount Lemmon	Mount Lemmon Survey	·	2.2 km	MPC · JPL
601509	2013 EM_{170}	—	March 6, 2013	Haleakala	Pan-STARRS 1	·	570 m	MPC · JPL
601510	2013 EX_{170}	—	March 13, 2013	Haleakala	Pan-STARRS 1	·	590 m	MPC · JPL
601511	2013 EY_{170}	—	March 5, 2013	Mount Lemmon	Mount Lemmon Survey	·	1.7 km	MPC · JPL
601512	2013 ES_{171}	—	March 8, 2013	Haleakala	Pan-STARRS 1	EOS	1.4 km	MPC · JPL
601513	2013 EV_{179}	—	March 8, 2013	Haleakala	Pan-STARRS 1	·	1.9 km	MPC · JPL
601514	2013 FM_{1}	—	September 4, 2008	Kitt Peak	Spacewatch	L4	8.6 km	MPC · JPL
601515	2013 FE_{6}	—	February 14, 2013	Mount Lemmon	Mount Lemmon Survey	·	1.9 km	MPC · JPL
601516	2013 FB_{11}	—	March 20, 2013	Haleakala	Pan-STARRS 1	H	500 m	MPC · JPL
601517	2013 FT_{12}	—	April 21, 2002	Palomar	NEAT	TIR	2.8 km	MPC · JPL
601518	2013 FE_{14}	—	October 25, 2011	Haleakala	Pan-STARRS 1	·	2.1 km	MPC · JPL
601519	2013 FF_{19}	—	March 26, 2006	Mount Lemmon	Mount Lemmon Survey	·	600 m	MPC · JPL
601520	2013 FJ_{20}	—	April 24, 2006	Kitt Peak	Spacewatch	·	710 m	MPC · JPL
601521	2013 FY_{21}	—	March 31, 2013	Mount Lemmon	Mount Lemmon Survey	·	2.0 km	MPC · JPL
601522	2013 FP_{23}	—	March 13, 2013	Haleakala	Pan-STARRS 1	·	2.2 km	MPC · JPL
601523	2013 FF_{26}	—	April 3, 2013	Palomar	Palomar Transient Factory	·	3.2 km	MPC · JPL
601524	2013 FE_{29}	—	November 30, 2011	Mount Lemmon	Mount Lemmon Survey	·	1.2 km	MPC · JPL
601525	2013 FZ_{31}	—	March 19, 2002	Anderson Mesa	LONEOS	·	2.5 km	MPC · JPL
601526	2013 FC_{32}	—	January 16, 2018	Haleakala	Pan-STARRS 1	·	2.7 km	MPC · JPL
601527	2013 FS_{32}	—	March 16, 2013	Kitt Peak	Spacewatch	·	2.5 km	MPC · JPL
601528	2013 FS_{33}	—	March 18, 2013	Mount Lemmon	Mount Lemmon Survey	EOS	1.4 km	MPC · JPL
601529	2013 FX_{33}	—	March 19, 2013	Haleakala	Pan-STARRS 1	·	610 m	MPC · JPL
601530	2013 FZ_{33}	—	March 16, 2013	Kitt Peak	Spacewatch	LIX	2.1 km	MPC · JPL
601531	2013 FU_{37}	—	March 19, 2013	Haleakala	Pan-STARRS 1	·	840 m	MPC · JPL
601532	2013 FH_{38}	—	March 5, 2008	Mount Lemmon	Mount Lemmon Survey	·	1.6 km	MPC · JPL
601533	2013 GT	—	March 13, 2013	Kitt Peak	Spacewatch	·	580 m	MPC · JPL
601534	2013 GK_{1}	—	April 1, 2013	Kitt Peak	Spacewatch	·	2.6 km	MPC · JPL
601535	2013 GY_{2}	—	November 1, 2005	Kitt Peak	Spacewatch	·	2.2 km	MPC · JPL
601536	2013 GO_{4}	—	December 5, 2005	Mount Lemmon	Mount Lemmon Survey	·	700 m	MPC · JPL
601537	2013 GS_{9}	—	July 8, 2003	Palomar	NEAT	·	800 m	MPC · JPL
601538	2013 GY_{10}	—	March 5, 2013	Haleakala	Pan-STARRS 1	·	2.7 km	MPC · JPL
601539	2013 GS_{11}	—	May 4, 2008	Kitt Peak	Spacewatch	·	2.7 km	MPC · JPL
601540	2013 GK_{13}	—	April 5, 2008	Mount Lemmon	Mount Lemmon Survey	·	2.2 km	MPC · JPL
601541	2013 GS_{15}	—	April 4, 2013	Haleakala	Pan-STARRS 1	·	500 m	MPC · JPL
601542	2013 GW_{15}	—	March 8, 2013	Haleakala	Pan-STARRS 1	·	2.4 km	MPC · JPL
601543	2013 GC_{19}	—	April 5, 2013	Palomar	Palomar Transient Factory	·	1.7 km	MPC · JPL
601544	2013 GL_{21}	—	March 21, 2013	Elena Remote	Oreshko, A.	·	630 m	MPC · JPL
601545	2013 GV_{29}	—	April 2, 2013	Mount Lemmon	Mount Lemmon Survey	·	2.6 km	MPC · JPL
601546	2013 GV_{30}	—	March 14, 2013	Kitt Peak	Spacewatch	·	2.5 km	MPC · JPL
601547	2013 GE_{31}	—	March 23, 2013	Palomar	Palomar Transient Factory	·	2.7 km	MPC · JPL
601548	2013 GB_{34}	—	April 7, 2013	Elena Remote	Oreshko, A.	EOS	1.9 km	MPC · JPL
601549	2013 GP_{35}	—	April 21, 2002	Palomar	NEAT	·	3.3 km	MPC · JPL
601550	2013 GU_{37}	—	April 6, 2013	Kitt Peak	Spacewatch	·	2.9 km	MPC · JPL
601551	2013 GH_{39}	—	February 25, 2006	Kitt Peak	Spacewatch	·	530 m	MPC · JPL
601552	2013 GO_{40}	—	November 10, 2010	Charleston	R. Holmes	·	3.4 km	MPC · JPL
601553	2013 GJ_{41}	—	October 5, 2004	Kitt Peak	Spacewatch	·	2.4 km	MPC · JPL
601554	2013 GY_{43}	—	April 8, 2013	Mount Lemmon	Mount Lemmon Survey	·	2.0 km	MPC · JPL
601555	2013 GD_{48}	—	January 14, 2012	Mount Lemmon	Mount Lemmon Survey	VER	2.4 km	MPC · JPL
601556	2013 GV_{48}	—	March 18, 2013	Kitt Peak	Spacewatch	V	610 m	MPC · JPL
601557	2013 GG_{49}	—	January 2, 2009	Mount Lemmon	Mount Lemmon Survey	·	600 m	MPC · JPL
601558	2013 GM_{50}	—	March 24, 2006	Kitt Peak	Spacewatch	·	760 m	MPC · JPL
601559	2013 GO_{51}	—	March 16, 2013	Kitt Peak	Spacewatch	·	960 m	MPC · JPL
601560	2013 GC_{60}	—	October 12, 2010	Bergisch Gladbach	W. Bickel	EOS	1.8 km	MPC · JPL
601561	2013 GK_{61}	—	April 7, 2013	Mount Lemmon	Mount Lemmon Survey	·	2.5 km	MPC · JPL
601562	2013 GM_{62}	—	April 7, 2013	Mount Lemmon	Mount Lemmon Survey	·	2.2 km	MPC · JPL
601563	2013 GZ_{62}	—	April 1, 2008	Kitt Peak	Spacewatch	·	1.6 km	MPC · JPL
601564	2013 GU_{64}	—	March 16, 2013	Kitt Peak	Spacewatch	·	2.3 km	MPC · JPL
601565	2013 GP_{75}	—	March 5, 2013	Mount Lemmon	Mount Lemmon Survey	·	1.3 km	MPC · JPL
601566	2013 GN_{76}	—	January 31, 2009	Kitt Peak	Spacewatch	NYS	980 m	MPC · JPL
601567	2013 GS_{76}	—	January 2, 2012	Mount Lemmon	Mount Lemmon Survey	VER	2.1 km	MPC · JPL
601568	2013 GC_{77}	—	March 19, 2013	Haleakala	Pan-STARRS 1	·	550 m	MPC · JPL
601569	2013 GK_{77}	—	April 30, 2008	Mount Lemmon	Mount Lemmon Survey	·	2.5 km	MPC · JPL
601570	2013 GO_{83}	—	September 20, 2003	Kitt Peak	Spacewatch	·	3.2 km	MPC · JPL
601571	2013 GC_{90}	—	April 15, 2013	Haleakala	Pan-STARRS 1	·	610 m	MPC · JPL
601572	2013 GZ_{90}	—	February 10, 2008	Catalina	CSS	·	1.9 km	MPC · JPL
601573	2013 GF_{93}	—	March 13, 2013	Haleakala	Pan-STARRS 1	·	2.3 km	MPC · JPL
601574	2013 GR_{94}	—	December 17, 2007	Kitt Peak	Spacewatch	·	1.5 km	MPC · JPL
601575	2013 GT_{98}	—	December 3, 2005	Mauna Kea	A. Boattini	·	690 m	MPC · JPL
601576	2013 GO_{102}	—	March 15, 2013	Kitt Peak	Spacewatch	·	2.1 km	MPC · JPL
601577	2013 GC_{105}	—	March 10, 2003	Kitt Peak	Spacewatch	·	630 m	MPC · JPL
601578	2013 GW_{105}	—	March 25, 2003	Palomar	NEAT	·	790 m	MPC · JPL
601579	2013 GA_{108}	—	March 6, 2008	Mount Lemmon	Mount Lemmon Survey	·	2.8 km	MPC · JPL
601580	2013 GU_{113}	—	May 6, 2002	Palomar	NEAT	LUT	4.9 km	MPC · JPL
601581	2013 GH_{115}	—	September 1, 2010	Mount Lemmon	Mount Lemmon Survey	·	1.6 km	MPC · JPL
601582	2013 GR_{115}	—	February 17, 2007	Mount Lemmon	Mount Lemmon Survey	·	2.8 km	MPC · JPL
601583	2013 GF_{116}	—	November 25, 2005	Kitt Peak	Spacewatch	EOS	1.7 km	MPC · JPL
601584	2013 GA_{119}	—	November 6, 2010	Mount Lemmon	Mount Lemmon Survey	EOS	1.7 km	MPC · JPL
601585	2013 GT_{120}	—	October 7, 2004	Kitt Peak	Spacewatch	THM	2.5 km	MPC · JPL
601586	2013 GA_{124}	—	April 9, 2013	Haleakala	Pan-STARRS 1	EOS	1.6 km	MPC · JPL
601587	2013 GB_{130}	—	June 20, 2010	Mount Lemmon	Mount Lemmon Survey	PHO	960 m	MPC · JPL
601588	2013 GF_{130}	—	September 5, 2000	Kitt Peak	Spacewatch	·	900 m	MPC · JPL
601589	2013 GD_{139}	—	September 2, 2010	Mount Lemmon	Mount Lemmon Survey	·	1.9 km	MPC · JPL
601590	2013 GD_{142}	—	September 6, 2015	Kitt Peak	Spacewatch	·	2.4 km	MPC · JPL
601591	2013 GE_{143}	—	April 13, 2013	Haleakala	Pan-STARRS 1	·	1.8 km	MPC · JPL
601592	2013 GU_{145}	—	April 13, 2013	Haleakala	Pan-STARRS 1	·	560 m	MPC · JPL
601593	2013 GF_{146}	—	April 14, 2013	Haleakala	Pan-STARRS 1	PHO	830 m	MPC · JPL
601594	2013 GC_{147}	—	September 12, 2015	Haleakala	Pan-STARRS 1	EOS	1.6 km	MPC · JPL
601595	2013 GY_{147}	—	November 20, 2016	Mount Lemmon	Mount Lemmon Survey	·	2.1 km	MPC · JPL
601596	2013 GD_{151}	—	April 15, 2013	Haleakala	Pan-STARRS 1	·	620 m	MPC · JPL
601597	2013 GQ_{151}	—	April 15, 2013	Haleakala	Pan-STARRS 1	LIX	3.2 km	MPC · JPL
601598	2013 GG_{152}	—	April 13, 2013	Haleakala	Pan-STARRS 1	·	600 m	MPC · JPL
601599	2013 GU_{153}	—	April 10, 2013	Haleakala	Pan-STARRS 1	·	2.4 km	MPC · JPL
601600	2013 HM_{5}	—	April 18, 2013	Palomar	Palomar Transient Factory	T_{j} (2.99)	3.2 km	MPC · JPL

== 601601–601700 ==
back to top

Designation			Discovery			Properties		Ref
Permanent	Provisional	Named after	Date	Site	Discoverer(s)	Category	Diam.	Ref
601601	2013 HE_{9}	—	March 5, 2013	Haleakala	Pan-STARRS 1	·	2.7 km	MPC · JPL
601602	2013 HX_{13}	—	April 5, 2000	Kitt Peak	Spacewatch	·	370 m	MPC · JPL
601603	2013 HE_{19}	—	January 1, 2009	Mount Lemmon	Mount Lemmon Survey	·	610 m	MPC · JPL
601604	2013 HQ_{19}	—	April 15, 2013	Catalina	CSS	EUP	3.5 km	MPC · JPL
601605	2013 HY_{19}	—	November 9, 2009	Mount Lemmon	Mount Lemmon Survey	H	410 m	MPC · JPL
601606	2013 HR_{21}	—	April 21, 2013	Catalina	CSS	·	1.6 km	MPC · JPL
601607	2013 HX_{22}	—	June 5, 2002	Palomar	NEAT	·	3.2 km	MPC · JPL
601608	2013 HJ_{26}	—	April 12, 2013	Haleakala	Pan-STARRS 1	·	630 m	MPC · JPL
601609	2013 HP_{30}	—	April 9, 2013	Haleakala	Pan-STARRS 1	·	2.4 km	MPC · JPL
601610	2013 HW_{33}	—	October 15, 2007	Altschwendt	W. Ries	·	600 m	MPC · JPL
601611	2013 HH_{35}	—	September 27, 2005	Kitt Peak	Spacewatch	·	1.6 km	MPC · JPL
601612	2013 HE_{36}	—	November 4, 2010	Mount Lemmon	Mount Lemmon Survey	·	1.8 km	MPC · JPL
601613	2013 HP_{45}	—	January 18, 2012	Mount Lemmon	Mount Lemmon Survey	HYG	2.0 km	MPC · JPL
601614	2013 HZ_{45}	—	April 9, 2013	Haleakala	Pan-STARRS 1	·	1.8 km	MPC · JPL
601615	2013 HK_{47}	—	December 14, 2010	Mount Lemmon	Mount Lemmon Survey	·	2.7 km	MPC · JPL
601616	2013 HN_{47}	—	April 16, 2013	Cerro Tololo-DECam	DECam	·	1.7 km	MPC · JPL
601617	2013 HL_{51}	—	November 11, 2010	Mount Lemmon	Mount Lemmon Survey	·	2.2 km	MPC · JPL
601618	2013 HA_{55}	—	September 22, 2011	Kitt Peak	Spacewatch	·	500 m	MPC · JPL
601619	2013 HV_{56}	—	April 9, 2013	Haleakala	Pan-STARRS 1	·	1.3 km	MPC · JPL
601620	2013 HF_{64}	—	November 2, 2010	Mount Lemmon	Mount Lemmon Survey	·	1.9 km	MPC · JPL
601621	2013 HP_{65}	—	April 16, 2013	Cerro Tololo-DECam	DECam	·	510 m	MPC · JPL
601622	2013 HL_{78}	—	March 14, 2007	Mount Lemmon	Mount Lemmon Survey	EOS	1.3 km	MPC · JPL
601623	2013 HE_{85}	—	October 6, 2004	Kitt Peak	Spacewatch	VER	2.1 km	MPC · JPL
601624	2013 HO_{88}	—	April 16, 2013	Cerro Tololo-DECam	DECam	·	510 m	MPC · JPL
601625	2013 HU_{88}	—	October 12, 2007	Mount Lemmon	Mount Lemmon Survey	·	790 m	MPC · JPL
601626	2013 HA_{89}	—	April 16, 2013	Cerro Tololo-DECam	DECam	·	1.8 km	MPC · JPL
601627	2013 HM_{95}	—	March 14, 2007	Mount Lemmon	Mount Lemmon Survey	EOS	1.4 km	MPC · JPL
601628	2013 HF_{98}	—	September 19, 1998	Apache Point	SDSS	·	2.0 km	MPC · JPL
601629	2013 HZ_{101}	—	April 16, 2013	Cerro Tololo-DECam	DECam	·	410 m	MPC · JPL
601630	2013 HM_{104}	—	September 17, 2010	Mount Lemmon	Mount Lemmon Survey	EOS	1.4 km	MPC · JPL
601631	2013 HL_{107}	—	April 9, 2002	Cerro Tololo	Deep Ecliptic Survey	·	1.8 km	MPC · JPL
601632	2013 HU_{114}	—	December 1, 2010	Mount Lemmon	Mount Lemmon Survey	·	1.9 km	MPC · JPL
601633	2013 HY_{114}	—	October 30, 2010	Mount Lemmon	Mount Lemmon Survey	EOS	1.7 km	MPC · JPL
601634	2013 HN_{120}	—	October 11, 2001	Kitt Peak	Spacewatch	·	670 m	MPC · JPL
601635	2013 HV_{120}	—	March 15, 2013	Kitt Peak	Spacewatch	THM	1.7 km	MPC · JPL
601636	2013 HZ_{121}	—	March 17, 2013	Mount Lemmon	Mount Lemmon Survey	T_{j} (2.98)	2.5 km	MPC · JPL
601637	2013 HD_{123}	—	April 10, 2013	Haleakala	Pan-STARRS 1	·	2.2 km	MPC · JPL
601638	2013 HP_{124}	—	April 9, 2013	Haleakala	Pan-STARRS 1	·	2.0 km	MPC · JPL
601639	2013 HY_{125}	—	April 12, 2013	Siding Spring	SSS	·	560 m	MPC · JPL
601640	2013 HV_{126}	—	April 9, 2013	Haleakala	Pan-STARRS 1	THB	1.7 km	MPC · JPL
601641	2013 HT_{129}	—	April 9, 2013	Haleakala	Pan-STARRS 1	·	610 m	MPC · JPL
601642	2013 HW_{148}	—	December 29, 2011	Mount Lemmon	Mount Lemmon Survey	EOS	1.3 km	MPC · JPL
601643	2013 HT_{152}	—	April 9, 2013	Haleakala	Pan-STARRS 1	VER	2.1 km	MPC · JPL
601644	2013 HC_{154}	—	August 5, 2005	Siding Spring	SSS	·	1.3 km	MPC · JPL
601645	2013 HB_{158}	—	April 19, 2013	Haleakala	Pan-STARRS 1	·	1.9 km	MPC · JPL
601646	2013 HA_{159}	—	April 19, 2013	Haleakala	Pan-STARRS 1	EUP	2.6 km	MPC · JPL
601647	2013 HK_{159}	—	November 3, 2016	Haleakala	Pan-STARRS 1	·	2.1 km	MPC · JPL
601648	2013 HV_{159}	—	April 17, 2013	Haleakala	Pan-STARRS 1	·	580 m	MPC · JPL
601649	2013 HW_{160}	—	January 18, 2009	Kitt Peak	Spacewatch	·	570 m	MPC · JPL
601650	2013 HW_{161}	—	April 21, 2013	Mount Lemmon	Mount Lemmon Survey	NYS	670 m	MPC · JPL
601651	2013 HA_{163}	—	April 16, 2013	Haleakala	Pan-STARRS 1	·	2.5 km	MPC · JPL
601652	2013 HV_{163}	—	April 19, 2013	Haleakala	Pan-STARRS 1	·	1.1 km	MPC · JPL
601653	2013 JD_{2}	—	April 10, 2013	XuYi	PMO NEO Survey Program	T_{j} (2.99) · EUP	2.3 km	MPC · JPL
601654	2013 JU_{2}	—	April 13, 2013	Haleakala	Pan-STARRS 1	·	910 m	MPC · JPL
601655	2013 JM_{4}	—	April 13, 2008	Kitt Peak	Spacewatch	H	470 m	MPC · JPL
601656	2013 JW_{4}	—	September 27, 2003	Kitt Peak	Spacewatch	·	3.2 km	MPC · JPL
601657	2013 JH_{9}	—	November 10, 2010	Mount Lemmon	Mount Lemmon Survey	·	3.2 km	MPC · JPL
601658	2013 JS_{10}	—	May 7, 2013	Mount Lemmon	Mount Lemmon Survey	·	560 m	MPC · JPL
601659	2013 JS_{15}	—	January 7, 2006	Kitt Peak	Spacewatch	·	3.6 km	MPC · JPL
601660	2013 JF_{20}	—	May 2, 2013	Mount Lemmon	Mount Lemmon Survey	·	1.9 km	MPC · JPL
601661	2013 JP_{22}	—	May 13, 1996	Kitt Peak	Spacewatch	·	880 m	MPC · JPL
601662	2013 JO_{23}	—	September 7, 2004	Socorro	LINEAR	·	2.3 km	MPC · JPL
601663	2013 JG_{31}	—	December 29, 2011	Mount Lemmon	Mount Lemmon Survey	EOS	1.7 km	MPC · JPL
601664	2013 JM_{40}	—	May 12, 2013	Haleakala	Pan-STARRS 1	·	1.5 km	MPC · JPL
601665	2013 JP_{41}	—	March 14, 2007	Anderson Mesa	LONEOS	·	2.5 km	MPC · JPL
601666	2013 JO_{42}	—	May 11, 2013	Mount Lemmon	Mount Lemmon Survey	·	570 m	MPC · JPL
601667	2013 JM_{43}	—	October 18, 2009	Mount Lemmon	Mount Lemmon Survey	·	2.8 km	MPC · JPL
601668	2013 JT_{47}	—	May 12, 2013	Haleakala	Pan-STARRS 1	·	2.6 km	MPC · JPL
601669	2013 JF_{49}	—	May 1, 2013	Kitt Peak	Spacewatch	PHO	810 m	MPC · JPL
601670	2013 JM_{49}	—	May 1, 2013	Mount Lemmon	Mount Lemmon Survey	THM	2.0 km	MPC · JPL
601671	2013 JU_{57}	—	April 15, 2013	Haleakala	Pan-STARRS 1	·	790 m	MPC · JPL
601672	2013 JD_{59}	—	December 2, 2005	Mount Lemmon	Mount Lemmon Survey	THM	1.9 km	MPC · JPL
601673	2013 JG_{60}	—	April 15, 2013	Haleakala	Pan-STARRS 1	·	560 m	MPC · JPL
601674	2013 JH_{62}	—	April 11, 2013	Mount Lemmon	Mount Lemmon Survey	·	1.0 km	MPC · JPL
601675	2013 JP_{66}	—	February 5, 2016	Haleakala	Pan-STARRS 1	V	470 m	MPC · JPL
601676	2013 JY_{67}	—	August 22, 2014	Haleakala	Pan-STARRS 1	·	990 m	MPC · JPL
601677	2013 JD_{68}	—	May 13, 2013	Kitt Peak	Spacewatch	·	970 m	MPC · JPL
601678	2013 JF_{69}	—	May 8, 2013	Haleakala	Pan-STARRS 1	·	770 m	MPC · JPL
601679	2013 JG_{75}	—	May 1, 2013	Mount Lemmon	Mount Lemmon Survey	·	450 m	MPC · JPL
601680	2013 JA_{76}	—	May 11, 2013	Mount Lemmon	Mount Lemmon Survey	EOS	1.7 km	MPC · JPL
601681	2013 JZ_{76}	—	May 5, 2013	Mount Lemmon	Mount Lemmon Survey	·	2.7 km	MPC · JPL
601682	2013 JC_{77}	—	May 1, 2013	Mount Lemmon	Mount Lemmon Survey	VER	1.9 km	MPC · JPL
601683	2013 JP_{79}	—	March 11, 2005	Kitt Peak	Spacewatch	MAS	610 m	MPC · JPL
601684	2013 KP_{2}	—	November 16, 2006	Kitt Peak	Spacewatch	V	820 m	MPC · JPL
601685	2013 KY_{10}	—	May 3, 2013	Mount Lemmon	Mount Lemmon Survey	·	3.2 km	MPC · JPL
601686	2013 KF_{12}	—	June 5, 2002	Socorro	LINEAR	T_{j} (2.89)	2.8 km	MPC · JPL
601687	2013 KR_{13}	—	September 11, 2010	Kitt Peak	Spacewatch	·	820 m	MPC · JPL
601688	2013 KK_{17}	—	May 19, 2013	Charleston	R. Holmes	·	2.8 km	MPC · JPL
601689	2013 KA_{18}	—	May 11, 2013	Siding Spring	SSS	PHO	720 m	MPC · JPL
601690	2013 KZ_{18}	—	May 16, 2013	Haleakala	Pan-STARRS 1	centaur	100 km	MPC · JPL
601691	2013 LA_{11}	—	June 4, 2013	Mount Lemmon	Mount Lemmon Survey	·	610 m	MPC · JPL
601692	2013 LF_{13}	—	June 5, 2013	Mount Lemmon	Mount Lemmon Survey	·	890 m	MPC · JPL
601693	2013 LK_{19}	—	May 16, 2013	Haleakala	Pan-STARRS 1	·	620 m	MPC · JPL
601694	2013 LC_{24}	—	June 2, 2013	Bergisch Gladbach	W. Bickel	EOS	2.0 km	MPC · JPL
601695	2013 LG_{28}	—	June 8, 2013	Kitt Peak	Spacewatch	·	2.6 km	MPC · JPL
601696	2013 LV_{28}	—	June 10, 2013	Mount Lemmon	Mount Lemmon Survey	APO	630 m	MPC · JPL
601697	2013 LU_{40}	—	June 10, 2013	Mount Lemmon	Mount Lemmon Survey	·	970 m	MPC · JPL
601698	2013 LS_{41}	—	June 7, 2013	Haleakala	Pan-STARRS 1	·	2.5 km	MPC · JPL
601699	2013 MH	—	September 6, 2002	Socorro	LINEAR	·	2.9 km	MPC · JPL
601700	2013 ML_{9}	—	June 18, 2013	Haleakala	Pan-STARRS 1	·	530 m	MPC · JPL

== 601701–601800 ==
back to top

Designation			Discovery			Properties		Ref
Permanent	Provisional	Named after	Date	Site	Discoverer(s)	Category	Diam.	Ref
601701	2013 MO_{14}	—	June 20, 2013	Haleakala	Pan-STARRS 1	·	760 m	MPC · JPL
601702	2013 MC_{16}	—	January 3, 2017	Haleakala	Pan-STARRS 1	TIR	2.8 km	MPC · JPL
601703	2013 ND_{2}	—	July 1, 2013	Haleakala	Pan-STARRS 1	·	2.7 km	MPC · JPL
601704	2013 NR_{3}	—	May 23, 2006	Mount Lemmon	Mount Lemmon Survey	·	710 m	MPC · JPL
601705	2013 NV_{3}	—	September 28, 2006	Bergisch Gladbach	W. Bickel	·	1.1 km	MPC · JPL
601706	2013 NE_{4}	—	August 6, 2002	Palomar	NEAT	·	1.2 km	MPC · JPL
601707	2013 NT_{5}	—	October 10, 2007	Catalina	CSS	·	760 m	MPC · JPL
601708	2013 NE_{10}	—	February 19, 2009	Kitt Peak	Spacewatch	·	580 m	MPC · JPL
601709	2013 NR_{26}	—	September 9, 2008	Mount Lemmon	Mount Lemmon Survey	·	1.0 km	MPC · JPL
601710	2013 NE_{28}	—	July 1, 2013	Haleakala	Pan-STARRS 1	V	470 m	MPC · JPL
601711	2013 NM_{33}	—	July 6, 2013	Haleakala	Pan-STARRS 1	·	1 km	MPC · JPL
601712	2013 NP_{33}	—	July 14, 2013	Haleakala	Pan-STARRS 1	·	480 m	MPC · JPL
601713	2013 NQ_{33}	—	July 15, 2013	Haleakala	Pan-STARRS 1	·	1.1 km	MPC · JPL
601714	2013 NT_{35}	—	November 20, 2015	Mount Lemmon	Mount Lemmon Survey	·	3.6 km	MPC · JPL
601715	2013 NO_{36}	—	July 1, 2013	Haleakala	Pan-STARRS 1	·	2.5 km	MPC · JPL
601716	2013 NC_{45}	—	August 3, 2014	Haleakala	Pan-STARRS 1	·	3.0 km	MPC · JPL
601717	2013 NM_{45}	—	July 14, 2013	Haleakala	Pan-STARRS 1	·	1.1 km	MPC · JPL
601718	2013 NU_{46}	—	July 14, 2013	Haleakala	Pan-STARRS 1	·	820 m	MPC · JPL
601719	2013 NW_{47}	—	February 9, 2005	Mount Lemmon	Mount Lemmon Survey	·	830 m	MPC · JPL
601720	2013 NK_{48}	—	July 13, 2013	Haleakala	Pan-STARRS 1	·	800 m	MPC · JPL
601721	2013 NG_{55}	—	July 14, 2013	Haleakala	Pan-STARRS 1	·	650 m	MPC · JPL
601722	2013 NJ_{62}	—	July 13, 2013	Haleakala	Pan-STARRS 1	·	1.7 km	MPC · JPL
601723	2013 OY_{6}	—	December 5, 2010	Mount Lemmon	Mount Lemmon Survey	·	1.4 km	MPC · JPL
601724	2013 OY_{9}	—	October 8, 2002	Palomar	NEAT	·	1.6 km	MPC · JPL
601725	2013 OM_{10}	—	July 30, 2013	Kitt Peak	Spacewatch	·	1.2 km	MPC · JPL
601726	2013 PL_{2}	—	June 18, 2013	Mount Lemmon	Mount Lemmon Survey	·	1.3 km	MPC · JPL
601727	2013 PN_{2}	—	June 20, 2013	Haleakala	Pan-STARRS 1	T_{j} (2.88)	3.2 km	MPC · JPL
601728	2013 PB_{3}	—	August 2, 2013	Haleakala	Pan-STARRS 1	H	480 m	MPC · JPL
601729	2013 PD_{8}	—	February 25, 2011	Mount Lemmon	Mount Lemmon Survey	·	2.2 km	MPC · JPL
601730	2013 PT_{10}	—	January 13, 2008	Kitt Peak	Spacewatch	·	1.3 km	MPC · JPL
601731 Kukuczka	2013 PV_{10}	Kukuczka	August 3, 2013	Tincana	M. Kusiak, M. Żołnowski	JUN	1.3 km	MPC · JPL
601732	2013 PO_{21}	—	July 11, 2004	Socorro	LINEAR	·	1.6 km	MPC · JPL
601733	2013 PM_{22}	—	August 1, 2013	Haleakala	Pan-STARRS 1	·	3.5 km	MPC · JPL
601734	2013 PB_{23}	—	October 2, 2008	Kitt Peak	Spacewatch	VER	2.0 km	MPC · JPL
601735	2013 PB_{25}	—	August 9, 2013	Kitt Peak	Spacewatch	·	1.0 km	MPC · JPL
601736	2013 PZ_{27}	—	August 8, 2013	Kitt Peak	Spacewatch	PHO	640 m	MPC · JPL
601737	2013 PB_{28}	—	April 25, 2003	Apache Point	SDSS Collaboration	HNS	1.3 km	MPC · JPL
601738	2013 PZ_{30}	—	August 10, 2013	Palomar	Palomar Transient Factory	·	1.0 km	MPC · JPL
601739	2013 PF_{31}	—	April 30, 2006	Kitt Peak	Spacewatch	·	660 m	MPC · JPL
601740	2013 PZ_{32}	—	December 15, 2010	Mount Lemmon	Mount Lemmon Survey	·	590 m	MPC · JPL
601741	2013 PN_{39}	—	September 30, 2003	Kitt Peak	Spacewatch	·	430 m	MPC · JPL
601742	2013 PJ_{51}	—	March 13, 2012	Mount Lemmon	Mount Lemmon Survey	·	820 m	MPC · JPL
601743	2013 PK_{60}	—	July 16, 2013	Haleakala	Pan-STARRS 1	TIR	1.8 km	MPC · JPL
601744	2013 PL_{64}	—	May 16, 2012	Haleakala	Pan-STARRS 1	ULA	3.4 km	MPC · JPL
601745	2013 PL_{70}	—	August 2, 2013	Haleakala	Pan-STARRS 1	PHO	1.1 km	MPC · JPL
601746	2013 PG_{73}	—	August 6, 2013	ESA OGS	ESA OGS	·	880 m	MPC · JPL
601747	2013 PA_{77}	—	November 3, 2008	Mount Lemmon	Mount Lemmon Survey	·	3.2 km	MPC · JPL
601748	2013 PX_{86}	—	August 12, 2013	Haleakala	Pan-STARRS 1	·	840 m	MPC · JPL
601749	2013 PM_{88}	—	August 8, 2013	Haleakala	Pan-STARRS 1	·	890 m	MPC · JPL
601750	2013 PD_{92}	—	August 15, 2013	Haleakala	Pan-STARRS 1	PHO	730 m	MPC · JPL
601751	2013 PU_{98}	—	August 14, 2013	Haleakala	Pan-STARRS 1	·	450 m	MPC · JPL
601752	2013 PW_{100}	—	August 4, 2013	Haleakala	Pan-STARRS 1	H	410 m	MPC · JPL
601753	2013 PJ_{101}	—	August 14, 2013	Haleakala	Pan-STARRS 1	·	490 m	MPC · JPL
601754	2013 PL_{117}	—	August 25, 2004	Kitt Peak	Spacewatch	·	1.1 km	MPC · JPL
601755	2013 PP_{118}	—	August 14, 2013	Haleakala	Pan-STARRS 1	EOS	1.4 km	MPC · JPL
601756	2013 PY_{118}	—	August 9, 2013	Haleakala	Pan-STARRS 1	·	1 km	MPC · JPL
601757	2013 QS_{4}	—	October 4, 2002	Palomar	NEAT	·	920 m	MPC · JPL
601758	2013 QM_{11}	—	September 21, 2003	Kitt Peak	Spacewatch	H	490 m	MPC · JPL
601759	2013 QL_{13}	—	August 12, 2013	Kitt Peak	Spacewatch	MAS	590 m	MPC · JPL
601760	2013 QU_{14}	—	November 27, 2010	Mount Lemmon	Mount Lemmon Survey	·	960 m	MPC · JPL
601761	2013 QG_{19}	—	March 10, 2005	Mount Lemmon	Mount Lemmon Survey	NYS	910 m	MPC · JPL
601762	2013 QH_{20}	—	May 7, 2006	Kitt Peak	Spacewatch	·	550 m	MPC · JPL
601763	2013 QE_{25}	—	August 14, 2013	Haleakala	Pan-STARRS 1	NYS	1.1 km	MPC · JPL
601764	2013 QM_{28}	—	August 8, 2013	Kitt Peak	Spacewatch	·	990 m	MPC · JPL
601765	2013 QC_{35}	—	August 24, 2006	Palomar	NEAT	·	570 m	MPC · JPL
601766	2013 QK_{35}	—	August 14, 2013	Haleakala	Pan-STARRS 1	NYS	840 m	MPC · JPL
601767	2013 QC_{38}	—	January 17, 2004	Palomar	NEAT	PHO	660 m	MPC · JPL
601768	2013 QQ_{42}	—	August 9, 2013	Haleakala	Pan-STARRS 1	NYS	810 m	MPC · JPL
601769	2013 QV_{46}	—	August 30, 2013	Haleakala	Pan-STARRS 1	H	540 m	MPC · JPL
601770	2013 QN_{59}	—	September 20, 1998	Kitt Peak	Spacewatch	SUL	2.0 km	MPC · JPL
601771	2013 QV_{61}	—	June 19, 2013	Mount Lemmon	Mount Lemmon Survey	NYS	1.1 km	MPC · JPL
601772	2013 QO_{62}	—	October 2, 2006	Mount Lemmon	Mount Lemmon Survey	MAS	530 m	MPC · JPL
601773	2013 QD_{73}	—	August 9, 2013	Kitt Peak	Spacewatch	·	1.7 km	MPC · JPL
601774	2013 QR_{74}	—	September 16, 2006	Palomar	NEAT	NYS	1.2 km	MPC · JPL
601775	2013 QZ_{81}	—	September 17, 2010	Mount Lemmon	Mount Lemmon Survey	·	640 m	MPC · JPL
601776	2013 QH_{85}	—	August 27, 2005	Palomar	NEAT	H	430 m	MPC · JPL
601777	2013 QQ_{90}	—	August 8, 2013	Kitt Peak	Spacewatch	NYS	810 m	MPC · JPL
601778	2013 QO_{99}	—	August 28, 2013	Mount Lemmon	Mount Lemmon Survey	·	740 m	MPC · JPL
601779	2013 QQ_{101}	—	August 28, 2013	Haleakala	Pan-STARRS 1	·	2.0 km	MPC · JPL
601780	2013 RR_{15}	—	December 2, 2010	Mount Lemmon	Mount Lemmon Survey	V	490 m	MPC · JPL
601781	2013 RH_{23}	—	February 27, 2012	Haleakala	Pan-STARRS 1	·	820 m	MPC · JPL
601782	2013 RT_{27}	—	August 27, 2005	Palomar	NEAT	·	1.7 km	MPC · JPL
601783	2013 RH_{30}	—	September 4, 2013	Haleakala	Pan-STARRS 1	H	550 m	MPC · JPL
601784	2013 RQ_{37}	—	July 28, 2005	Palomar	NEAT	·	1.2 km	MPC · JPL
601785	2013 RR_{40}	—	September 5, 2013	Kitt Peak	Spacewatch	NYS	990 m	MPC · JPL
601786	2013 RB_{46}	—	August 13, 2013	Črni Vrh	Matičič, S.	·	1.4 km	MPC · JPL
601787	2013 RR_{46}	—	September 29, 2003	Kitt Peak	Spacewatch	·	610 m	MPC · JPL
601788	2013 RQ_{49}	—	December 9, 2010	Kitt Peak	Spacewatch	·	970 m	MPC · JPL
601789	2013 RX_{52}	—	September 1, 2013	Haleakala	Pan-STARRS 1	·	850 m	MPC · JPL
601790	2013 RO_{61}	—	December 25, 2005	Mount Lemmon	Mount Lemmon Survey	·	2.1 km	MPC · JPL
601791	2013 RS_{65}	—	August 29, 2006	Wrightwood	J. W. Young	·	760 m	MPC · JPL
601792	2013 RG_{67}	—	February 28, 2008	Mount Lemmon	Mount Lemmon Survey	NYS	950 m	MPC · JPL
601793	2013 RT_{67}	—	September 16, 2003	Kitt Peak	Spacewatch	·	730 m	MPC · JPL
601794	2013 RX_{70}	—	September 6, 2004	Palomar	NEAT	EUN	1.3 km	MPC · JPL
601795	2013 RJ_{73}	—	April 30, 2011	Mount Lemmon	Mount Lemmon Survey	·	1.7 km	MPC · JPL
601796	2013 RZ_{78}	—	May 19, 2005	Mount Lemmon	Mount Lemmon Survey	NYS	1.2 km	MPC · JPL
601797	2013 RB_{80}	—	September 4, 2013	Catalina	CSS	T_{j} (2.91)	2.4 km	MPC · JPL
601798	2013 RX_{80}	—	September 15, 2013	La Sagra	OAM	APO +1km	810 m	MPC · JPL
601799	2013 RG_{84}	—	September 26, 2006	Kitt Peak	Spacewatch	·	840 m	MPC · JPL
601800	2013 RP_{97}	—	October 1, 2013	Catalina	CSS	·	1.3 km	MPC · JPL

== 601801–601900 ==
back to top

Designation			Discovery			Properties		Ref
Permanent	Provisional	Named after	Date	Site	Discoverer(s)	Category	Diam.	Ref
601801	2013 RP_{100}	—	October 20, 2008	Kitt Peak	Spacewatch	·	2.3 km	MPC · JPL
601802	2013 RF_{104}	—	February 28, 2012	Haleakala	Pan-STARRS 1	·	730 m	MPC · JPL
601803	2013 RT_{104}	—	September 13, 2005	Kitt Peak	Spacewatch	·	930 m	MPC · JPL
601804	2013 RW_{107}	—	September 1, 2013	Mount Lemmon	Mount Lemmon Survey	·	870 m	MPC · JPL
601805	2013 RL_{119}	—	September 14, 2013	Haleakala	Pan-STARRS 1	·	2.9 km	MPC · JPL
601806	2013 RZ_{130}	—	September 1, 2013	Mount Lemmon	Mount Lemmon Survey	·	530 m	MPC · JPL
601807	2013 RO_{131}	—	September 15, 2013	Kitt Peak	Spacewatch	·	780 m	MPC · JPL
601808	2013 RQ_{136}	—	September 9, 2013	Haleakala	Pan-STARRS 1	SUL	1.5 km	MPC · JPL
601809	2013 RY_{146}	—	September 14, 2013	Haleakala	Pan-STARRS 1	·	2.2 km	MPC · JPL
601810	2013 RN_{152}	—	October 26, 2009	Kitt Peak	Spacewatch	·	1.2 km	MPC · JPL
601811	2013 SS_{4}	—	September 17, 2013	Mount Lemmon	Mount Lemmon Survey	·	1.8 km	MPC · JPL
601812	2013 SF_{20}	—	January 25, 2004	Sierra Nevada	Santos-Sanz, P.	H	700 m	MPC · JPL
601813	2013 SV_{33}	—	February 13, 2008	Kitt Peak	Spacewatch	·	600 m	MPC · JPL
601814	2013 SE_{55}	—	May 19, 2012	Mount Lemmon	Mount Lemmon Survey	·	1.5 km	MPC · JPL
601815	2013 SP_{55}	—	September 28, 2013	Catalina	CSS	·	1.2 km	MPC · JPL
601816	2013 SK_{70}	—	March 23, 2006	Kitt Peak	Spacewatch	THM	2.2 km	MPC · JPL
601817	2013 SM_{77}	—	April 22, 2009	Mount Lemmon	Mount Lemmon Survey	·	530 m	MPC · JPL
601818	2013 SK_{80}	—	December 13, 2010	Mauna Kea	M. Micheli, L. Wells	·	1.1 km	MPC · JPL
601819	2013 SC_{86}	—	May 3, 2002	Palomar	NEAT	H	690 m	MPC · JPL
601820	2013 SR_{98}	—	January 30, 2008	Mount Lemmon	Mount Lemmon Survey	·	1.3 km	MPC · JPL
601821	2013 SB_{99}	—	October 24, 2009	Kitt Peak	Spacewatch	·	1.7 km	MPC · JPL
601822	2013 TU	—	October 1, 2013	Elena Remote	Oreshko, A.	·	2.9 km	MPC · JPL
601823	2013 TA_{4}	—	October 2, 2013	Kitt Peak	Spacewatch	·	580 m	MPC · JPL
601824	2013 TL_{5}	—	October 13, 2010	Mount Lemmon	Mount Lemmon Survey	·	1.0 km	MPC · JPL
601825	2013 TL_{34}	—	October 2, 2013	Palomar	Palomar Transient Factory	L5	8.7 km	MPC · JPL
601826	2013 TK_{36}	—	January 17, 2007	Kitt Peak	Spacewatch	MAS	610 m	MPC · JPL
601827	2013 TL_{38}	—	September 4, 2013	Mount Lemmon	Mount Lemmon Survey	EUN	1.1 km	MPC · JPL
601828	2013 TT_{40}	—	March 12, 2007	Kitt Peak	Spacewatch	·	1.2 km	MPC · JPL
601829	2013 TP_{41}	—	October 7, 2005	Kitt Peak	Spacewatch	T_{j} (2.98) · 3:2	3.6 km	MPC · JPL
601830	2013 TE_{45}	—	February 7, 2011	Mount Lemmon	Mount Lemmon Survey	CLA	1.1 km	MPC · JPL
601831	2013 TY_{47}	—	March 25, 2006	Kitt Peak	Spacewatch	BRA	1.5 km	MPC · JPL
601832	2013 TX_{50}	—	July 28, 2005	Palomar	NEAT	·	1.4 km	MPC · JPL
601833	2013 TJ_{53}	—	October 27, 2006	Catalina	CSS	·	560 m	MPC · JPL
601834	2013 TD_{57}	—	October 2, 2013	Kitt Peak	Spacewatch	·	1.1 km	MPC · JPL
601835	2013 TC_{60}	—	August 6, 2008	Siding Spring	SSS	·	2.3 km	MPC · JPL
601836	2013 TL_{67}	—	May 16, 2002	Palomar	NEAT	V	860 m	MPC · JPL
601837	2013 TU_{75}	—	October 15, 2004	Kitt Peak	Spacewatch	GEF	970 m	MPC · JPL
601838	2013 TM_{80}	—	September 6, 2013	Kitt Peak	Spacewatch	·	560 m	MPC · JPL
601839	2013 TO_{85}	—	May 14, 2008	Kitt Peak	Spacewatch	PHO	740 m	MPC · JPL
601840	2013 TP_{86}	—	September 26, 2006	Mount Lemmon	Mount Lemmon Survey	·	620 m	MPC · JPL
601841	2013 TH_{92}	—	September 25, 2006	Mount Lemmon	Mount Lemmon Survey	·	490 m	MPC · JPL
601842	2013 TN_{95}	—	April 10, 2000	Kitt Peak	M. W. Buie	·	1.2 km	MPC · JPL
601843	2013 TW_{101}	—	August 14, 2006	Siding Spring	SSS	·	520 m	MPC · JPL
601844	2013 TR_{106}	—	April 27, 2012	Haleakala	Pan-STARRS 1	V	600 m	MPC · JPL
601845	2013 TT_{112}	—	October 3, 2013	Haleakala	Pan-STARRS 1	·	1.7 km	MPC · JPL
601846	2013 TF_{125}	—	August 30, 2009	Kitt Peak	Spacewatch	·	950 m	MPC · JPL
601847	2013 TQ_{126}	—	August 21, 2006	Kitt Peak	Spacewatch	·	560 m	MPC · JPL
601848	2013 TP_{132}	—	March 4, 2012	Catalina	CSS	H	450 m	MPC · JPL
601849	2013 TG_{159}	—	November 19, 2003	Kitt Peak	Spacewatch	·	1.5 km	MPC · JPL
601850	2013 TP_{161}	—	October 14, 2013	Mount Lemmon	Mount Lemmon Survey	·	2.2 km	MPC · JPL
601851	2013 TE_{163}	—	April 6, 2008	Mount Lemmon	Mount Lemmon Survey	·	1.0 km	MPC · JPL
601852	2013 TM_{166}	—	October 3, 2013	Mount Lemmon	Mount Lemmon Survey	PHO	580 m	MPC · JPL
601853	2013 TV_{166}	—	October 3, 2013	Mount Lemmon	Mount Lemmon Survey	·	860 m	MPC · JPL
601854	2013 TS_{170}	—	October 5, 2013	Kitt Peak	Spacewatch	·	1.5 km	MPC · JPL
601855	2013 TZ_{172}	—	October 14, 2013	Kitt Peak	Spacewatch	MAR	830 m	MPC · JPL
601856	2013 TL_{173}	—	October 2, 2013	Haleakala	Pan-STARRS 1	PHO	670 m	MPC · JPL
601857	2013 TH_{178}	—	October 12, 2013	Kitt Peak	Spacewatch	MAS	520 m	MPC · JPL
601858	2013 TT_{182}	—	October 3, 2013	Haleakala	Pan-STARRS 1	3:2	4.3 km	MPC · JPL
601859	2013 TF_{184}	—	January 17, 2015	Haleakala	Pan-STARRS 1	·	1.6 km	MPC · JPL
601860	2013 TZ_{210}	—	October 3, 2013	Kitt Peak	Spacewatch	·	600 m	MPC · JPL
601861	2013 TL_{224}	—	October 2, 2013	Haleakala	Pan-STARRS 1	L5	7.1 km	MPC · JPL
601862	2013 TW_{224}	—	October 5, 2013	Haleakala	Pan-STARRS 1	L5	6.8 km	MPC · JPL
601863	2013 UO_{1}	—	January 22, 2012	Haleakala	Pan-STARRS 1	H	450 m	MPC · JPL
601864	2013 UH_{2}	—	December 21, 2008	Catalina	CSS	H	540 m	MPC · JPL
601865	2013 UZ_{6}	—	August 15, 2006	Palomar	NEAT	·	600 m	MPC · JPL
601866	2013 UP_{10}	—	September 11, 2005	Kitt Peak	Spacewatch	H	400 m	MPC · JPL
601867	2013 UL_{12}	—	September 1, 2002	Emerald Lane	L. Ball	·	1.2 km	MPC · JPL
601868	2013 UR_{12}	—	August 5, 2005	Palomar	NEAT	·	1.1 km	MPC · JPL
601869	2013 UL_{25}	—	October 26, 2013	Mount Lemmon	Mount Lemmon Survey	·	870 m	MPC · JPL
601870	2013 UL_{30}	—	October 24, 2013	Mount Lemmon	Mount Lemmon Survey	3:2 · SHU	4.0 km	MPC · JPL
601871	2013 US_{32}	—	October 28, 2013	Mount Lemmon	Mount Lemmon Survey	·	1.5 km	MPC · JPL
601872	2013 UW_{39}	—	October 25, 2013	Kitt Peak	Spacewatch	V	470 m	MPC · JPL
601873	2013 UU_{45}	—	March 16, 2007	Mount Lemmon	Mount Lemmon Survey	·	1.1 km	MPC · JPL
601874	2013 US_{47}	—	October 24, 2013	Mount Lemmon	Mount Lemmon Survey	·	1.5 km	MPC · JPL
601875	2013 VC	—	July 20, 2013	Haleakala	Pan-STARRS 1	·	1.1 km	MPC · JPL
601876	2013 VX_{10}	—	August 20, 2009	La Sagra	OAM	MAS	660 m	MPC · JPL
601877	2013 VU_{13}	—	October 25, 2005	Catalina	CSS	H	590 m	MPC · JPL
601878	2013 VN_{15}	—	November 9, 2013	Haleakala	Pan-STARRS 1	·	1.6 km	MPC · JPL
601879	2013 VC_{19}	—	November 6, 2013	Haleakala	Pan-STARRS 1	PHO	990 m	MPC · JPL
601880	2013 VP_{19}	—	September 11, 2004	Socorro	LINEAR	EUN	1.3 km	MPC · JPL
601881	2013 VQ_{24}	—	November 4, 2013	Kitt Peak	Spacewatch	H	410 m	MPC · JPL
601882	2013 VU_{29}	—	November 20, 2009	Kitt Peak	Spacewatch	·	970 m	MPC · JPL
601883	2013 VR_{32}	—	November 10, 2013	Mount Lemmon	Mount Lemmon Survey	·	960 m	MPC · JPL
601884	2013 VA_{34}	—	January 18, 2015	Haleakala	Pan-STARRS 1	·	910 m	MPC · JPL
601885	2013 VR_{36}	—	June 9, 2016	Mount Lemmon	Mount Lemmon Survey	·	920 m	MPC · JPL
601886	2013 VQ_{38}	—	November 8, 2013	Kitt Peak	Spacewatch	·	980 m	MPC · JPL
601887	2013 VB_{40}	—	April 25, 2003	Kitt Peak	Spacewatch	·	1.7 km	MPC · JPL
601888	2013 VR_{41}	—	November 6, 2013	Haleakala	Pan-STARRS 1	·	960 m	MPC · JPL
601889	2013 VN_{53}	—	November 1, 2013	Mount Lemmon	Mount Lemmon Survey	·	780 m	MPC · JPL
601890	2013 VX_{65}	—	November 2, 2013	Mount Lemmon	Mount Lemmon Survey	·	1.8 km	MPC · JPL
601891	2013 VR_{68}	—	November 9, 2013	Catalina	CSS	·	1.8 km	MPC · JPL
601892	2013 WR	—	November 1, 2013	Nogales	M. Schwartz, P. R. Holvorcem	H	560 m	MPC · JPL
601893	2013 WS_{14}	—	April 6, 2011	Mount Lemmon	Mount Lemmon Survey	·	1.1 km	MPC · JPL
601894 Naiman	2013 WP_{15}	Naiman	November 14, 2009	La Palma	EURONEAR	·	1.1 km	MPC · JPL
601895	2013 WM_{17}	—	November 27, 2013	Haleakala	Pan-STARRS 1	·	1.3 km	MPC · JPL
601896	2013 WW_{18}	—	November 12, 2010	Mount Lemmon	Mount Lemmon Survey	H	540 m	MPC · JPL
601897	2013 WG_{22}	—	November 6, 2013	Haleakala	Pan-STARRS 1	·	720 m	MPC · JPL
601898	2013 WG_{23}	—	December 20, 2001	Apache Point	SDSS Collaboration	·	1.3 km	MPC · JPL
601899	2013 WE_{28}	—	November 2, 2013	Mount Lemmon	Mount Lemmon Survey	·	1.0 km	MPC · JPL
601900	2013 WZ_{30}	—	November 26, 2013	Haleakala	Pan-STARRS 1	·	820 m	MPC · JPL

== 601901–602000 ==
back to top

Designation			Discovery			Properties		Ref
Permanent	Provisional	Named after	Date	Site	Discoverer(s)	Category	Diam.	Ref
601901	2013 WA_{37}	—	November 27, 2013	Haleakala	Pan-STARRS 1	·	2.6 km	MPC · JPL
601902	2013 WT_{38}	—	November 9, 2013	Kitt Peak	Spacewatch	H	460 m	MPC · JPL
601903	2013 WN_{44}	—	November 6, 2013	Haleakala	Pan-STARRS 1	H	390 m	MPC · JPL
601904	2013 WK_{51}	—	September 19, 2007	Mount Lemmon	Mount Lemmon Survey	·	1.7 km	MPC · JPL
601905	2013 WG_{54}	—	January 2, 2011	Mount Lemmon	Mount Lemmon Survey	·	630 m	MPC · JPL
601906	2013 WM_{54}	—	July 3, 2005	Palomar	NEAT	·	1.3 km	MPC · JPL
601907	2013 WO_{54}	—	October 24, 2005	Palomar	NEAT	H	460 m	MPC · JPL
601908	2013 WN_{56}	—	November 26, 2013	Nogales	M. Schwartz, P. R. Holvorcem	·	3.0 km	MPC · JPL
601909	2013 WX_{59}	—	November 24, 2008	Kitt Peak	Spacewatch	·	1.3 km	MPC · JPL
601910	2013 WT_{63}	—	November 29, 2013	Haleakala	Pan-STARRS 1	·	1.5 km	MPC · JPL
601911	2013 WD_{70}	—	December 14, 2001	Kitt Peak	Spacewatch	·	920 m	MPC · JPL
601912	2013 WL_{71}	—	October 4, 2006	Mount Lemmon	Mount Lemmon Survey	·	500 m	MPC · JPL
601913	2013 WJ_{76}	—	May 21, 2012	Haleakala	Pan-STARRS 1	EUN	900 m	MPC · JPL
601914	2013 WU_{79}	—	September 29, 2013	Mount Lemmon	Mount Lemmon Survey	·	1.4 km	MPC · JPL
601915	2013 WV_{92}	—	November 28, 2013	Mount Lemmon	Mount Lemmon Survey	·	1.0 km	MPC · JPL
601916 Sting	2013 WJ_{98}	Sting	November 28, 2013	Tincana	M. Kusiak, M. Żołnowski	·	1.4 km	MPC · JPL
601917	2013 WE_{104}	—	October 14, 2013	Nogales	M. Schwartz, P. R. Holvorcem	·	1.9 km	MPC · JPL
601918	2013 WO_{105}	—	October 23, 2012	Haleakala	Pan-STARRS 1	·	2.3 km	MPC · JPL
601919	2013 WM_{110}	—	November 28, 2013	Haleakala	Pan-STARRS 1	H	480 m	MPC · JPL
601920	2013 WE_{113}	—	March 17, 2010	Siding Spring	SSS	JUN	1.0 km	MPC · JPL
601921	2013 WX_{114}	—	October 26, 2013	Mount Lemmon	Mount Lemmon Survey	·	1.2 km	MPC · JPL
601922	2013 WD_{116}	—	November 27, 2013	Haleakala	Pan-STARRS 1	·	1.1 km	MPC · JPL
601923	2013 WK_{120}	—	November 27, 2013	Haleakala	Pan-STARRS 1	·	790 m	MPC · JPL
601924	2013 WO_{120}	—	November 27, 2013	Haleakala	Pan-STARRS 1	·	1.2 km	MPC · JPL
601925	2013 WU_{123}	—	November 28, 2013	Mount Lemmon	Mount Lemmon Survey	·	960 m	MPC · JPL
601926	2013 WY_{127}	—	November 24, 2013	Haleakala	Pan-STARRS 1	(5)	1.1 km	MPC · JPL
601927	2013 WV_{128}	—	November 27, 2013	Haleakala	Pan-STARRS 1	·	1.1 km	MPC · JPL
601928	2013 WN_{136}	—	September 18, 2003	Kitt Peak	Spacewatch	·	2.0 km	MPC · JPL
601929	2013 WZ_{138}	—	November 29, 2013	Haleakala	Pan-STARRS 1	EUN	1.0 km	MPC · JPL
601930	2013 XA_{8}	—	December 4, 2013	Haleakala	Pan-STARRS 1	·	1.1 km	MPC · JPL
601931	2013 XK_{28}	—	December 4, 2013	Haleakala	Pan-STARRS 1	EUN	1.0 km	MPC · JPL
601932	2013 XT_{29}	—	December 3, 2013	Mount Lemmon	Mount Lemmon Survey	·	1.2 km	MPC · JPL
601933	2013 XW_{30}	—	December 12, 2013	Haleakala	Pan-STARRS 1	H	400 m	MPC · JPL
601934	2013 XF_{34}	—	December 4, 2013	Haleakala	Pan-STARRS 1	·	1.2 km	MPC · JPL
601935	2013 XW_{34}	—	December 13, 2013	Mount Lemmon	Mount Lemmon Survey	·	2.8 km	MPC · JPL
601936	2013 XH_{36}	—	December 7, 2013	Mount Lemmon	Mount Lemmon Survey	HOF	2.4 km	MPC · JPL
601937	2013 XP_{36}	—	December 1, 2013	XuYi	PMO NEO Survey Program	·	730 m	MPC · JPL
601938	2013 YM_{7}	—	December 1, 2008	Kitt Peak	Spacewatch	KOR	1.2 km	MPC · JPL
601939	2013 YR_{9}	—	December 24, 2013	Mount Lemmon	Mount Lemmon Survey	·	1.1 km	MPC · JPL
601940	2013 YO_{23}	—	March 11, 2002	Palomar	NEAT	(5)	1.4 km	MPC · JPL
601941	2013 YT_{27}	—	December 23, 2013	Mount Lemmon	Mount Lemmon Survey	·	1.1 km	MPC · JPL
601942	2013 YG_{33}	—	August 26, 2012	Haleakala	Pan-STARRS 1	·	1.8 km	MPC · JPL
601943	2013 YP_{34}	—	February 22, 2006	Palomar	NEAT	·	1.9 km	MPC · JPL
601944	2013 YS_{36}	—	November 29, 2013	Haleakala	Pan-STARRS 1	·	2.1 km	MPC · JPL
601945	2013 YB_{40}	—	September 21, 2003	Kitt Peak	Spacewatch	·	1.9 km	MPC · JPL
601946	2013 YM_{40}	—	May 15, 2002	Palomar	NEAT	·	2.0 km	MPC · JPL
601947	2013 YU_{43}	—	August 4, 2008	Siding Spring	SSS	·	1.5 km	MPC · JPL
601948	2013 YF_{46}	—	December 4, 2013	Haleakala	Pan-STARRS 1	·	1.1 km	MPC · JPL
601949	2013 YM_{49}	—	October 9, 2012	Haleakala	Pan-STARRS 1	·	1.2 km	MPC · JPL
601950	2013 YG_{54}	—	November 28, 2013	Mount Lemmon	Mount Lemmon Survey	(5)	1.2 km	MPC · JPL
601951	2013 YG_{58}	—	April 25, 2004	Apache Point	SDSS Collaboration	·	2.8 km	MPC · JPL
601952	2013 YS_{71}	—	October 10, 2008	Mount Lemmon	Mount Lemmon Survey	ADE	2.0 km	MPC · JPL
601953	2013 YC_{74}	—	September 15, 2012	Nogales	M. Schwartz, P. R. Holvorcem	·	1.4 km	MPC · JPL
601954	2013 YG_{83}	—	October 28, 2008	Mount Lemmon	Mount Lemmon Survey	·	1.2 km	MPC · JPL
601955	2013 YR_{90}	—	December 28, 2013	Kitt Peak	Spacewatch	H	610 m	MPC · JPL
601956	2013 YH_{91}	—	August 12, 2012	Kitt Peak	Spacewatch	·	1.1 km	MPC · JPL
601957	2013 YL_{93}	—	October 23, 2008	Kitt Peak	Spacewatch	·	1.2 km	MPC · JPL
601958	2013 YR_{97}	—	October 8, 2012	Mount Lemmon	Mount Lemmon Survey	·	1.5 km	MPC · JPL
601959	2013 YT_{97}	—	December 31, 2013	Kitt Peak	Spacewatch	·	1.1 km	MPC · JPL
601960	2013 YP_{106}	—	April 22, 2011	Kitt Peak	Spacewatch	·	1.8 km	MPC · JPL
601961	2013 YP_{108}	—	September 28, 2008	Catalina	CSS	·	2.0 km	MPC · JPL
601962	2013 YT_{112}	—	July 5, 2005	Mount Lemmon	Mount Lemmon Survey	·	3.4 km	MPC · JPL
601963	2013 YA_{116}	—	December 31, 1999	Kitt Peak	Spacewatch	·	1.4 km	MPC · JPL
601964	2013 YF_{118}	—	December 11, 2013	Haleakala	Pan-STARRS 1	·	620 m	MPC · JPL
601965	2013 YJ_{123}	—	December 30, 2013	Kitt Peak	Spacewatch	·	1.3 km	MPC · JPL
601966	2013 YU_{125}	—	February 10, 2010	Kitt Peak	Spacewatch	RAF	800 m	MPC · JPL
601967	2013 YB_{126}	—	December 30, 2013	Kitt Peak	Spacewatch	HNS	880 m	MPC · JPL
601968	2013 YX_{133}	—	September 24, 2012	Mount Lemmon	Mount Lemmon Survey	·	2.4 km	MPC · JPL
601969	2013 YS_{137}	—	December 6, 2013	Haleakala	Pan-STARRS 1	·	1.0 km	MPC · JPL
601970	2013 YY_{139}	—	December 30, 2013	Mount Lemmon	Mount Lemmon Survey	·	1.5 km	MPC · JPL
601971	2013 YQ_{140}	—	December 31, 2013	Mount Lemmon	Mount Lemmon Survey	·	2.0 km	MPC · JPL
601972	2013 YD_{147}	—	December 31, 2013	Mount Lemmon	Mount Lemmon Survey	·	1.6 km	MPC · JPL
601973	2013 YE_{148}	—	December 27, 2013	Kitt Peak	Spacewatch	·	1.5 km	MPC · JPL
601974	2013 YU_{151}	—	December 31, 2013	Kitt Peak	Spacewatch	·	2.5 km	MPC · JPL
601975	2013 YW_{151}	—	February 18, 2005	La Silla	A. Boattini	·	1.5 km	MPC · JPL
601976	2013 YC_{154}	—	December 26, 2013	Kitt Peak	Spacewatch	·	1.2 km	MPC · JPL
601977	2013 YQ_{163}	—	December 31, 2013	Mount Lemmon	Mount Lemmon Survey	·	1.1 km	MPC · JPL
601978	2013 YA_{165}	—	December 25, 2013	Mount Lemmon	Mount Lemmon Survey	NYS	800 m	MPC · JPL
601979	2013 YY_{167}	—	December 25, 2013	Mount Lemmon	Mount Lemmon Survey	KOR	1.1 km	MPC · JPL
601980	2014 AL	—	January 1, 2014	Nogales	M. Schwartz, P. R. Holvorcem	·	900 m	MPC · JPL
601981	2014 AP_{3}	—	March 11, 2002	Palomar	NEAT	·	1.6 km	MPC · JPL
601982	2014 AA_{4}	—	January 1, 2014	Haleakala	Pan-STARRS 1	·	1.9 km	MPC · JPL
601983	2014 AH_{11}	—	January 1, 2014	Mount Lemmon	Mount Lemmon Survey	·	1.2 km	MPC · JPL
601984	2014 AX_{11}	—	January 3, 2014	Mount Lemmon	Mount Lemmon Survey	·	1.1 km	MPC · JPL
601985	2014 AN_{12}	—	April 11, 2002	Palomar	NEAT	EUN	1.5 km	MPC · JPL
601986	2014 AR_{12}	—	January 3, 2014	Oukaïmeden	C. Rinner	EUN	1.0 km	MPC · JPL
601987	2014 AC_{15}	—	August 26, 2012	Haleakala	Pan-STARRS 1	·	1.8 km	MPC · JPL
601988	2014 AR_{17}	—	December 26, 2013	Kitt Peak	Spacewatch	·	1.1 km	MPC · JPL
601989	2014 AS_{20}	—	December 25, 2013	Kitt Peak	Spacewatch	HNS	1.0 km	MPC · JPL
601990	2014 AE_{21}	—	December 31, 2013	Mount Lemmon	Mount Lemmon Survey	·	1.7 km	MPC · JPL
601991	2014 AQ_{21}	—	November 6, 2005	Pla D'Arguines	R. Ferrando, Ferrando, M.	·	1.4 km	MPC · JPL
601992	2014 AU_{23}	—	October 6, 2008	Mount Lemmon	Mount Lemmon Survey	·	1.5 km	MPC · JPL
601993	2014 AZ_{24}	—	December 24, 2013	Mount Lemmon	Mount Lemmon Survey	·	850 m	MPC · JPL
601994	2014 AS_{25}	—	March 23, 2006	Kitt Peak	Spacewatch	·	1.1 km	MPC · JPL
601995	2014 AO_{27}	—	October 21, 2008	Kitt Peak	Spacewatch	·	1.3 km	MPC · JPL
601996	2014 AE_{30}	—	March 15, 2010	Catalina	CSS	·	1.8 km	MPC · JPL
601997	2014 AY_{33}	—	October 19, 2003	Palomar	NEAT	·	1.8 km	MPC · JPL
601998	2014 AR_{41}	—	December 24, 2013	Mount Lemmon	Mount Lemmon Survey	·	2.7 km	MPC · JPL
601999	2014 AV_{41}	—	July 21, 2006	Mount Lemmon	Mount Lemmon Survey	EOS	2.1 km	MPC · JPL
602000	2014 AV_{45}	—	February 22, 2003	Palomar	NEAT	·	3.5 km	MPC · JPL

back to top

== Meaning of names ==
As minor planet discoveries are confirmed, they are given a permanent number by the IAU's Minor Planet Center (MPC), and the discoverers can then submit names for them, following the IAU's naming conventions. The list below concerns those minor planets in the specified number-range that have received names, and explains the meanings of those names.

Official naming citations of newly named small Solar System bodies are approved and published in a bulletin by IAU's Working Group for Small Bodies Nomenclature (WGSBN). Before May 2021, citations were published in MPC's Minor Planet Circulars for many decades. Recent citations can also be found on the JPL Small-Body Database (SBDB). Until his death in 2016, German astronomer Lutz D. Schmadel compiled these citations into the Dictionary of Minor Planet Names (DMP) and regularly updated the collection.

Based on Paul Herget's The Names of the Minor Planets, Schmadel also researched the unclear origin of numerous asteroids, most of which had been named prior to World War II. This article incorporates text from this source, which is in the public domain: SBDB New namings may only be added to this list below after official publication as the preannouncement of names is condemned. The WGSBN publishes a comprehensive guideline for the naming rules of non-cometary small Solar System bodies.

Named minor planet	Provisional	This minor planet was named for...	Ref · Catalog
601036 Sassflóra	2012 UO_{67}	Flóra Sass (1841–1916), a Hungarian-born explorer and Africa researcher, known locally as Myadue, meaning the Morning Star.	IAU · 601036
601227 Ammann	2012 YF_{1}	Simon Ammann (b. 1981), a Swiss ski jumper.	IAU · 601227
601476 Scharun	2013 EH_{78}	Christian Scharun (b. 1992), a climate scientist from Karlsruhe, Germany	IAU · 601476
601731 Kukuczka	2013 PV_{10}	Jerzy Kukuczka (1948–1989), was a Polish alpine and high-altitude climber, who became the second man (after Reinhold Messner) to climb all fourteen eight-thousanders in 1987.	IAU · 601731
601894 Naiman	2013 WP_{15}	Marian H. Naiman, a former the Bucharest Astroclub, the oldest amateur club in Romania.	IAU · 601894
601916 Sting	2013 WJ_{98}	Sting (Gordon M. Sumner, born 1951), an English musician, singer, songwriter and actor, who also co-founded the rock band "The Police".	IAU · 601916
