= List of minor planets: 222001–223000 =

The following is a partial list of minor planets, running from minor-planet number 222001 through 223000, inclusive. The primary data for this and other partial lists is based on JPL's "Small-Body Orbital Elements" and data available from the Minor Planet Center. Critical list information is also provided by the MPC, unless otherwise specified from Lowell Observatory. A detailed description of the table's columns and additional sources are given on the main page including a complete list of every page in this series, and a statistical break-up on the dynamical classification of minor planets.

Also see the summary list of all named bodies in numerical and alphabetical order, and the corresponding naming citations for the number range of this particular list. New namings may only be added to this list after official publication, as the preannouncement of names is condemned by the Working Group for Small Bodies Nomenclature of the International Astronomical Union.

Near-Earth obj.	MBA (inner)	MBA (outer)	Centaur
Mars-crosser	MBA (middle)	Jupiter trojan	Trans-Neptunian obj.
Unclassified

== 222001–222100 ==
Designation			Discovery			Properties		Ref
Permanent	Provisional	Named after	Date	Site	Discoverer(s)	Category	Diam.	Ref
222001	1998 HU	—	April 17, 1998	Kitt Peak	Spacewatch	·	3.6 km	MPC · JPL
222002	1998 HN_{10}	—	April 17, 1998	Kitt Peak	Spacewatch	HIL · 3:2	8.2 km	MPC · JPL
222003	1998 HQ_{83}	—	April 21, 1998	Socorro	LINEAR	·	3.7 km	MPC · JPL
222004	1998 MF_{17}	—	June 27, 1998	Kitt Peak	Spacewatch	V	800 m	MPC · JPL
222005	1998 QA_{59}	—	August 26, 1998	Kitt Peak	Spacewatch	·	1.7 km	MPC · JPL
222006	1998 QJ_{59}	—	August 26, 1998	Kitt Peak	Spacewatch	·	3.8 km	MPC · JPL
222007	1998 QX_{59}	—	August 26, 1998	Kitt Peak	Spacewatch	·	3.2 km	MPC · JPL
222008	1998 QQ_{63}	—	August 31, 1998	Socorro	LINEAR	AMO	520 m	MPC · JPL
222009	1998 QO_{70}	—	August 24, 1998	Socorro	LINEAR	·	1.7 km	MPC · JPL
222010	1998 QY_{95}	—	August 19, 1998	Socorro	LINEAR	TEL	2.8 km	MPC · JPL
222011	1998 RP	—	September 9, 1998	Caussols	ODAS	·	2.5 km	MPC · JPL
222012	1998 RY_{2}	—	September 13, 1998	Kitt Peak	Spacewatch	·	2.2 km	MPC · JPL
222013	1998 RF_{45}	—	September 14, 1998	Socorro	LINEAR	·	3.2 km	MPC · JPL
222014	1998 SL_{5}	—	September 16, 1998	Kitt Peak	Spacewatch	NYS	1.2 km	MPC · JPL
222015	1998 SB_{7}	—	September 20, 1998	Kitt Peak	Spacewatch	V	740 m	MPC · JPL
222016	1998 SO_{7}	—	September 20, 1998	Kitt Peak	Spacewatch	·	1.5 km	MPC · JPL
222017	1998 SN_{39}	—	September 23, 1998	Kitt Peak	Spacewatch	·	3.1 km	MPC · JPL
222018	1998 SU_{41}	—	September 25, 1998	Kitt Peak	Spacewatch	V	810 m	MPC · JPL
222019	1998 ST_{44}	—	September 24, 1998	Kitt Peak	Spacewatch	·	1.7 km	MPC · JPL
222020	1998 SK_{46}	—	September 25, 1998	Kitt Peak	Spacewatch	·	3.3 km	MPC · JPL
222021	1998 SS_{48}	—	September 27, 1998	Kitt Peak	Spacewatch	·	1.4 km	MPC · JPL
222022	1998 SV_{50}	—	September 26, 1998	Kitt Peak	Spacewatch	·	3.5 km	MPC · JPL
222023	1998 SV_{63}	—	September 20, 1998	La Silla	E. W. Elst	·	1.8 km	MPC · JPL
222024	1998 SZ_{76}	—	September 26, 1998	Socorro	LINEAR	EOS	3.5 km	MPC · JPL
222025	1998 SF_{77}	—	September 26, 1998	Socorro	LINEAR	·	4.9 km	MPC · JPL
222026	1998 SX_{106}	—	September 26, 1998	Socorro	LINEAR	·	3.5 km	MPC · JPL
222027	1998 SK_{113}	—	September 26, 1998	Socorro	LINEAR	·	4.5 km	MPC · JPL
222028	1998 SW_{148}	—	September 26, 1998	Socorro	LINEAR	NYS	1.4 km	MPC · JPL
222029	1998 SA_{154}	—	September 26, 1998	Socorro	LINEAR	NYS	1.3 km	MPC · JPL
222030	1998 SF_{156}	—	September 26, 1998	Socorro	LINEAR	·	1.7 km	MPC · JPL
222031	1998 SP_{158}	—	September 26, 1998	Socorro	LINEAR	NYS	1.6 km	MPC · JPL
222032 Lupton	1998 SW_{172}	Lupton	September 19, 1998	Apache Point	SDSS	·	2.5 km	MPC · JPL
222033	1998 TE_{2}	—	October 13, 1998	Caussols	ODAS	·	4.1 km	MPC · JPL
222034	1998 TW_{2}	—	October 13, 1998	Caussols	ODAS	·	1.2 km	MPC · JPL
222035	1998 TM_{9}	—	October 12, 1998	Kitt Peak	Spacewatch	·	1.4 km	MPC · JPL
222036	1998 TA_{12}	—	October 13, 1998	Kitt Peak	Spacewatch	MAS	920 m	MPC · JPL
222037	1998 TC_{12}	—	October 13, 1998	Kitt Peak	Spacewatch	HYG	4.8 km	MPC · JPL
222038	1998 TB_{20}	—	October 13, 1998	Kitt Peak	Spacewatch	EOS	3.6 km	MPC · JPL
222039	1998 TM_{20}	—	October 13, 1998	Kitt Peak	Spacewatch	·	1.6 km	MPC · JPL
222040	1998 TT_{23}	—	October 14, 1998	Kitt Peak	Spacewatch	·	3.2 km	MPC · JPL
222041	1998 UZ_{2}	—	October 20, 1998	Caussols	ODAS	·	1.5 km	MPC · JPL
222042	1998 UH_{9}	—	October 16, 1998	Kitt Peak	Spacewatch	EOS	2.9 km	MPC · JPL
222043	1998 UM_{12}	—	October 18, 1998	Kitt Peak	Spacewatch	·	4.7 km	MPC · JPL
222044	1998 UR_{30}	—	October 18, 1998	La Silla	E. W. Elst	·	1.4 km	MPC · JPL
222045	1998 UH_{37}	—	October 28, 1998	Socorro	LINEAR	NYS	1.5 km	MPC · JPL
222046	1998 UG_{44}	—	October 16, 1998	Kitt Peak	Spacewatch	NYS	1.4 km	MPC · JPL
222047	1998 UE_{47}	—	October 24, 1998	Kitt Peak	Spacewatch	NYS ·	2.0 km	MPC · JPL
222048	1998 UG_{50}	—	October 28, 1998	Kitt Peak	Spacewatch	PHO	1.1 km	MPC · JPL
222049	1998 UT_{50}	—	October 18, 1998	Kitt Peak	Spacewatch	L4	10 km	MPC · JPL
222050	1998 VC_{2}	—	November 9, 1998	Caussols	ODAS	NYS	1.4 km	MPC · JPL
222051	1998 VW_{3}	—	November 10, 1998	Caussols	ODAS	MAS	830 m	MPC · JPL
222052	1998 VS_{14}	—	November 10, 1998	Socorro	LINEAR	·	3.9 km	MPC · JPL
222053	1998 VR_{55}	—	November 11, 1998	Socorro	LINEAR	·	4.4 km	MPC · JPL
222054	1998 WS_{2}	—	November 17, 1998	Caussols	ODAS	·	6.1 km	MPC · JPL
222055	1998 WF_{3}	—	November 18, 1998	Gekko	T. Kagawa	·	8.2 km	MPC · JPL
222056	1998 WK_{24}	—	November 18, 1998	Kitt Peak	M. W. Buie	L4	9.2 km	MPC · JPL
222057	1998 WS_{25}	—	November 16, 1998	Kitt Peak	Spacewatch	·	4.6 km	MPC · JPL
222058	1998 WE_{36}	—	November 19, 1998	Kitt Peak	Spacewatch	·	1.6 km	MPC · JPL
222059	1998 WQ_{37}	—	November 21, 1998	Kitt Peak	Spacewatch	EOS	2.8 km	MPC · JPL
222060	1998 WA_{39}	—	November 21, 1998	Kitt Peak	Spacewatch	·	4.7 km	MPC · JPL
222061	1998 XN_{5}	—	December 8, 1998	Kitt Peak	Spacewatch	MAS	1.1 km	MPC · JPL
222062	1998 XC_{6}	—	December 8, 1998	Kitt Peak	Spacewatch	PHO	2.8 km	MPC · JPL
222063	1998 XK_{6}	—	December 8, 1998	Kitt Peak	Spacewatch	L4	10 km	MPC · JPL
222064	1998 XO_{8}	—	December 12, 1998	Kitt Peak	Spacewatch	·	4.4 km	MPC · JPL
222065	1998 XZ_{22}	—	December 11, 1998	Kitt Peak	Spacewatch	·	4.3 km	MPC · JPL
222066	1998 XM_{59}	—	December 15, 1998	Socorro	LINEAR	·	8.8 km	MPC · JPL
222067	1999 AJ_{10}	—	January 14, 1999	Catalina	CSS	T_{j} (2.99) · EUP	9.9 km	MPC · JPL
222068	1999 EH_{15}	—	March 6, 1999	Kitt Peak	Spacewatch	·	2.4 km	MPC · JPL
222069	1999 FP_{84}	—	March 21, 1999	Apache Point	SDSS	·	2.1 km	MPC · JPL
222070	1999 GV_{11}	—	April 11, 1999	Kitt Peak	Spacewatch	·	1.3 km	MPC · JPL
222071	1999 GR_{12}	—	April 12, 1999	Kitt Peak	Spacewatch	·	4.3 km	MPC · JPL
222072	1999 GT_{60}	—	April 15, 1999	Socorro	LINEAR	·	2.7 km	MPC · JPL
222073	1999 HY_{1}	—	April 20, 1999	Socorro	LINEAR	AMO +1km	850 m	MPC · JPL
222074	1999 JO_{28}	—	May 10, 1999	Socorro	LINEAR	·	3.2 km	MPC · JPL
222075	1999 JX_{101}	—	May 13, 1999	Socorro	LINEAR	·	3.2 km	MPC · JPL
222076	1999 KM_{2}	—	May 16, 1999	Kitt Peak	Spacewatch	·	3.5 km	MPC · JPL
222077	1999 KK_{7}	—	May 17, 1999	Socorro	LINEAR	ADE	4.8 km	MPC · JPL
222078	1999 KR_{11}	—	May 18, 1999	Socorro	LINEAR	·	2.5 km	MPC · JPL
222079	1999 NE_{43}	—	July 13, 1999	Socorro	LINEAR	·	1.1 km	MPC · JPL
222080	1999 RH_{81}	—	September 7, 1999	Socorro	LINEAR	·	2.7 km	MPC · JPL
222081	1999 RL_{90}	—	September 7, 1999	Socorro	LINEAR	·	950 m	MPC · JPL
222082	1999 RM_{91}	—	September 7, 1999	Socorro	LINEAR	·	1.0 km	MPC · JPL
222083	1999 RB_{106}	—	September 8, 1999	Socorro	LINEAR	·	1.2 km	MPC · JPL
222084	1999 RP_{131}	—	September 9, 1999	Socorro	LINEAR	·	970 m	MPC · JPL
222085	1999 RD_{159}	—	September 9, 1999	Socorro	LINEAR	·	1.3 km	MPC · JPL
222086	1999 RP_{178}	—	September 9, 1999	Socorro	LINEAR	·	950 m	MPC · JPL
222087	1999 RG_{218}	—	September 4, 1999	Anderson Mesa	LONEOS	·	920 m	MPC · JPL
222088	1999 TR_{44}	—	October 3, 1999	Kitt Peak	Spacewatch	·	920 m	MPC · JPL
222089	1999 TQ_{46}	—	October 4, 1999	Kitt Peak	Spacewatch	KOR	1.6 km	MPC · JPL
222090	1999 TM_{50}	—	October 4, 1999	Kitt Peak	Spacewatch	KOR	1.7 km	MPC · JPL
222091	1999 TG_{51}	—	October 4, 1999	Kitt Peak	Spacewatch	·	3.4 km	MPC · JPL
222092	1999 TT_{112}	—	October 4, 1999	Socorro	LINEAR	·	1.1 km	MPC · JPL
222093	1999 TU_{129}	—	October 6, 1999	Socorro	LINEAR	(2076)	1.2 km	MPC · JPL
222094	1999 TP_{133}	—	October 6, 1999	Socorro	LINEAR	·	2.8 km	MPC · JPL
222095	1999 TG_{141}	—	October 6, 1999	Socorro	LINEAR	·	1.3 km	MPC · JPL
222096	1999 TX_{154}	—	October 15, 1999	Socorro	LINEAR	·	3.0 km	MPC · JPL
222097	1999 TU_{157}	—	October 9, 1999	Socorro	LINEAR	H	660 m	MPC · JPL
222098	1999 TG_{167}	—	October 10, 1999	Socorro	LINEAR	·	990 m	MPC · JPL
222099	1999 TK_{170}	—	October 10, 1999	Socorro	LINEAR	·	2.1 km	MPC · JPL
222100	1999 TH_{177}	—	October 10, 1999	Socorro	LINEAR	·	2.5 km	MPC · JPL

== 222101–222200 ==
back to top

Designation			Discovery			Properties		Ref
Permanent	Provisional	Named after	Date	Site	Discoverer(s)	Category	Diam.	Ref
222101	1999 TR_{204}	—	October 13, 1999	Socorro	LINEAR	·	1.0 km	MPC · JPL
222102	1999 TA_{206}	—	October 13, 1999	Socorro	LINEAR	·	950 m	MPC · JPL
222103	1999 TC_{208}	—	October 14, 1999	Socorro	LINEAR	H	790 m	MPC · JPL
222104	1999 TU_{253}	—	October 10, 1999	Socorro	LINEAR	·	1.5 km	MPC · JPL
222105	1999 TC_{254}	—	October 11, 1999	Kitt Peak	Spacewatch	·	2.7 km	MPC · JPL
222106	1999 TO_{257}	—	October 9, 1999	Socorro	LINEAR	·	930 m	MPC · JPL
222107	1999 TG_{269}	—	October 3, 1999	Socorro	LINEAR	·	940 m	MPC · JPL
222108	1999 TU_{285}	—	October 10, 1999	Socorro	LINEAR	·	2.7 km	MPC · JPL
222109	1999 TT_{299}	—	October 2, 1999	Kitt Peak	Spacewatch	·	2.1 km	MPC · JPL
222110	1999 UW_{11}	—	October 29, 1999	Kitt Peak	Spacewatch	EOS	2.7 km	MPC · JPL
222111	1999 UG_{12}	—	October 31, 1999	Kitt Peak	Spacewatch	·	3.3 km	MPC · JPL
222112	1999 UZ_{17}	—	October 30, 1999	Kitt Peak	Spacewatch	KOR	1.6 km	MPC · JPL
222113	1999 US_{19}	—	October 30, 1999	Kitt Peak	Spacewatch	·	660 m	MPC · JPL
222114	1999 UY_{21}	—	October 31, 1999	Kitt Peak	Spacewatch	·	2.3 km	MPC · JPL
222115	1999 UL_{28}	—	October 31, 1999	Kitt Peak	Spacewatch	·	780 m	MPC · JPL
222116	1999 UF_{29}	—	October 31, 1999	Kitt Peak	Spacewatch	·	1.8 km	MPC · JPL
222117	1999 UQ_{31}	—	October 31, 1999	Kitt Peak	Spacewatch	KOR	1.7 km	MPC · JPL
222118	1999 UH_{37}	—	October 16, 1999	Kitt Peak	Spacewatch	·	900 m	MPC · JPL
222119	1999 US_{37}	—	October 16, 1999	Kitt Peak	Spacewatch	KOR	1.5 km	MPC · JPL
222120	1999 UF_{47}	—	October 29, 1999	Catalina	CSS	EOS	3.2 km	MPC · JPL
222121	1999 VC_{51}	—	November 3, 1999	Socorro	LINEAR	·	1.4 km	MPC · JPL
222122	1999 VZ_{55}	—	November 4, 1999	Socorro	LINEAR	·	840 m	MPC · JPL
222123	1999 VG_{64}	—	November 4, 1999	Socorro	LINEAR	·	2.8 km	MPC · JPL
222124	1999 VZ_{64}	—	November 4, 1999	Socorro	LINEAR	·	930 m	MPC · JPL
222125	1999 VO_{76}	—	November 5, 1999	Kitt Peak	Spacewatch	·	820 m	MPC · JPL
222126	1999 VE_{80}	—	November 4, 1999	Socorro	LINEAR	·	1.3 km	MPC · JPL
222127	1999 VJ_{80}	—	November 4, 1999	Socorro	LINEAR	EOS	3.4 km	MPC · JPL
222128	1999 VD_{86}	—	November 4, 1999	Socorro	LINEAR	·	1.1 km	MPC · JPL
222129	1999 VM_{93}	—	November 9, 1999	Socorro	LINEAR	·	3.1 km	MPC · JPL
222130	1999 VX_{93}	—	November 9, 1999	Socorro	LINEAR	·	980 m	MPC · JPL
222131	1999 VT_{104}	—	November 9, 1999	Socorro	LINEAR	·	990 m	MPC · JPL
222132	1999 VV_{104}	—	November 9, 1999	Socorro	LINEAR	·	4.9 km	MPC · JPL
222133	1999 VV_{105}	—	November 9, 1999	Socorro	LINEAR	·	1.0 km	MPC · JPL
222134	1999 VK_{112}	—	November 9, 1999	Socorro	LINEAR	L4	10 km	MPC · JPL
222135	1999 VH_{123}	—	November 5, 1999	Kitt Peak	Spacewatch	KOR	1.5 km	MPC · JPL
222136	1999 VG_{126}	—	November 9, 1999	Kitt Peak	Spacewatch	·	970 m	MPC · JPL
222137	1999 VP_{145}	—	November 9, 1999	Socorro	LINEAR	·	1.5 km	MPC · JPL
222138	1999 VH_{150}	—	November 14, 1999	Socorro	LINEAR	·	1.0 km	MPC · JPL
222139	1999 VQ_{150}	—	November 14, 1999	Socorro	LINEAR	KOR	2.1 km	MPC · JPL
222140	1999 VR_{151}	—	November 14, 1999	Socorro	LINEAR	·	1.1 km	MPC · JPL
222141	1999 VP_{209}	—	November 14, 1999	Kitt Peak	Spacewatch	·	1.7 km	MPC · JPL
222142	1999 VY_{212}	—	November 12, 1999	Socorro	LINEAR	·	2.0 km	MPC · JPL
222143	1999 WJ_{14}	—	November 28, 1999	Kitt Peak	Spacewatch	·	1.1 km	MPC · JPL
222144	1999 WA_{15}	—	November 29, 1999	Kitt Peak	Spacewatch	·	3.0 km	MPC · JPL
222145	1999 XV_{14}	—	December 6, 1999	Socorro	LINEAR	PHO	1.7 km	MPC · JPL
222146	1999 XD_{49}	—	December 7, 1999	Socorro	LINEAR	·	970 m	MPC · JPL
222147	1999 XD_{56}	—	December 7, 1999	Socorro	LINEAR	·	1.2 km	MPC · JPL
222148	1999 XW_{62}	—	December 7, 1999	Socorro	LINEAR	EOS	2.7 km	MPC · JPL
222149	1999 XA_{66}	—	December 7, 1999	Socorro	LINEAR	·	2.5 km	MPC · JPL
222150	1999 XK_{133}	—	December 12, 1999	Socorro	LINEAR	·	3.1 km	MPC · JPL
222151	1999 XP_{143}	—	December 15, 1999	Socorro	LINEAR	H	800 m	MPC · JPL
222152	1999 XG_{184}	—	December 12, 1999	Socorro	LINEAR	·	3.2 km	MPC · JPL
222153	1999 XT_{188}	—	December 12, 1999	Socorro	LINEAR	BAP	1.5 km	MPC · JPL
222154	1999 XQ_{211}	—	December 13, 1999	Socorro	LINEAR	·	3.8 km	MPC · JPL
222155	1999 XL_{226}	—	December 14, 1999	Kitt Peak	Spacewatch	·	3.2 km	MPC · JPL
222156	1999 XD_{261}	—	December 8, 1999	Socorro	LINEAR	·	4.5 km	MPC · JPL
222157	1999 YC_{4}	—	December 19, 1999	Socorro	LINEAR	PHO	1.4 km	MPC · JPL
222158	1999 YL_{10}	—	December 27, 1999	Kitt Peak	Spacewatch	·	920 m	MPC · JPL
222159	2000 AD_{9}	—	January 2, 2000	Socorro	LINEAR	·	990 m	MPC · JPL
222160	2000 AT_{10}	—	January 3, 2000	Socorro	LINEAR	·	3.0 km	MPC · JPL
222161	2000 AP_{23}	—	January 3, 2000	Socorro	LINEAR	·	5.0 km	MPC · JPL
222162	2000 AD_{30}	—	January 3, 2000	Socorro	LINEAR	·	4.5 km	MPC · JPL
222163	2000 AB_{55}	—	January 4, 2000	Socorro	LINEAR	·	4.7 km	MPC · JPL
222164	2000 AM_{65}	—	January 4, 2000	Socorro	LINEAR	·	3.5 km	MPC · JPL
222165	2000 AX_{93}	—	January 5, 2000	Socorro	LINEAR	AMO +1km	930 m	MPC · JPL
222166	2000 AU_{107}	—	January 5, 2000	Socorro	LINEAR	·	4.5 km	MPC · JPL
222167	2000 AB_{111}	—	January 5, 2000	Socorro	LINEAR	EOS	2.8 km	MPC · JPL
222168	2000 AH_{116}	—	January 5, 2000	Socorro	LINEAR	·	6.5 km	MPC · JPL
222169	2000 AR_{152}	—	January 8, 2000	Socorro	LINEAR	H	850 m	MPC · JPL
222170	2000 AC_{177}	—	January 7, 2000	Socorro	LINEAR	·	4.5 km	MPC · JPL
222171	2000 AH_{208}	—	January 4, 2000	Kitt Peak	Spacewatch	LIX	7.4 km	MPC · JPL
222172	2000 AM_{215}	—	January 7, 2000	Kitt Peak	Spacewatch	·	3.2 km	MPC · JPL
222173	2000 AX_{236}	—	January 5, 2000	Kitt Peak	Spacewatch	HYG	3.9 km	MPC · JPL
222174	2000 BN_{16}	—	January 30, 2000	Socorro	LINEAR	·	1.3 km	MPC · JPL
222175	2000 BB_{24}	—	January 29, 2000	Socorro	LINEAR	·	5.4 km	MPC · JPL
222176	2000 BR_{24}	—	January 29, 2000	Socorro	LINEAR	·	4.2 km	MPC · JPL
222177	2000 BL_{29}	—	January 27, 2000	Višnjan	K. Korlević	·	1.2 km	MPC · JPL
222178	2000 BA_{33}	—	January 29, 2000	Kitt Peak	Spacewatch	MAS	1.1 km	MPC · JPL
222179	2000 BY_{34}	—	January 29, 2000	Catalina	CSS	EUP	7.8 km	MPC · JPL
222180	2000 CM_{24}	—	February 2, 2000	Socorro	LINEAR	·	4.7 km	MPC · JPL
222181	2000 CK_{28}	—	February 2, 2000	Socorro	LINEAR	URS	4.7 km	MPC · JPL
222182	2000 CW_{59}	—	February 2, 2000	Socorro	LINEAR	·	2.1 km	MPC · JPL
222183	2000 CO_{61}	—	February 2, 2000	Socorro	LINEAR	·	3.9 km	MPC · JPL
222184	2000 CO_{68}	—	February 1, 2000	Kitt Peak	Spacewatch	MAS	840 m	MPC · JPL
222185	2000 CR_{72}	—	February 2, 2000	Socorro	LINEAR	·	740 m	MPC · JPL
222186	2000 CX_{74}	—	February 8, 2000	Kitt Peak	Spacewatch	V	890 m	MPC · JPL
222187	2000 CD_{88}	—	February 4, 2000	Socorro	LINEAR	·	12 km	MPC · JPL
222188	2000 CQ_{113}	—	February 11, 2000	Socorro	LINEAR	·	4.3 km	MPC · JPL
222189	2000 CX_{131}	—	February 3, 2000	Kitt Peak	Spacewatch	THM	3.4 km	MPC · JPL
222190	2000 DW_{5}	—	February 26, 2000	Socorro	LINEAR	PHO	1.3 km	MPC · JPL
222191	2000 DL_{34}	—	February 29, 2000	Socorro	LINEAR	NYS	1.3 km	MPC · JPL
222192	2000 DO_{35}	—	February 29, 2000	Socorro	LINEAR	HYG	4.0 km	MPC · JPL
222193	2000 DG_{37}	—	February 29, 2000	Socorro	LINEAR	·	6.1 km	MPC · JPL
222194	2000 DE_{55}	—	February 29, 2000	Socorro	LINEAR	·	1.7 km	MPC · JPL
222195	2000 DW_{56}	—	February 29, 2000	Socorro	LINEAR	·	4.6 km	MPC · JPL
222196	2000 DO_{66}	—	February 29, 2000	Socorro	LINEAR	·	5.4 km	MPC · JPL
222197	2000 DA_{82}	—	February 28, 2000	Socorro	LINEAR	·	6.0 km	MPC · JPL
222198	2000 DX_{85}	—	February 29, 2000	Socorro	LINEAR	·	5.4 km	MPC · JPL
222199	2000 DL_{89}	—	February 26, 2000	Kitt Peak	Spacewatch	HYG	3.7 km	MPC · JPL
222200	2000 DQ_{99}	—	February 29, 2000	Socorro	LINEAR	·	1.8 km	MPC · JPL

== 222201–222300 ==
back to top

Designation			Discovery			Properties		Ref
Permanent	Provisional	Named after	Date	Site	Discoverer(s)	Category	Diam.	Ref
222201	2000 DG_{101}	—	February 29, 2000	Socorro	LINEAR	·	1.5 km	MPC · JPL
222202	2000 DP_{104}	—	February 29, 2000	Socorro	LINEAR	·	2.0 km	MPC · JPL
222203	2000 DA_{115}	—	February 27, 2000	Kitt Peak	Spacewatch	·	1.6 km	MPC · JPL
222204	2000 DX_{116}	—	February 26, 2000	Kitt Peak	Spacewatch	·	4.6 km	MPC · JPL
222205	2000 DV_{117}	—	February 25, 2000	Kitt Peak	Spacewatch	·	1.5 km	MPC · JPL
222206	2000 EE_{1}	—	March 3, 2000	Socorro	LINEAR	NYS	2.0 km	MPC · JPL
222207	2000 EN_{3}	—	March 3, 2000	Socorro	LINEAR	NYS	970 m	MPC · JPL
222208	2000 EX_{41}	—	March 8, 2000	Socorro	LINEAR	·	1.6 km	MPC · JPL
222209	2000 EL_{49}	—	March 9, 2000	Socorro	LINEAR	·	4.8 km	MPC · JPL
222210	2000 EX_{59}	—	March 10, 2000	Socorro	LINEAR	·	1.4 km	MPC · JPL
222211	2000 EY_{95}	—	March 11, 2000	Socorro	LINEAR	NYS	1.2 km	MPC · JPL
222212	2000 ET_{99}	—	March 12, 2000	Kitt Peak	Spacewatch	·	910 m	MPC · JPL
222213	2000 EO_{100}	—	March 12, 2000	Kitt Peak	Spacewatch	·	1.1 km	MPC · JPL
222214	2000 ET_{101}	—	March 14, 2000	Kitt Peak	Spacewatch	·	1.3 km	MPC · JPL
222215	2000 ES_{121}	—	March 11, 2000	Catalina	CSS	EUP	5.4 km	MPC · JPL
222216	2000 EB_{160}	—	March 3, 2000	Socorro	LINEAR	·	2.7 km	MPC · JPL
222217	2000 EC_{168}	—	March 4, 2000	Socorro	LINEAR	·	4.3 km	MPC · JPL
222218	2000 EC_{174}	—	March 4, 2000	Socorro	LINEAR	·	5.5 km	MPC · JPL
222219	2000 FY_{3}	—	March 25, 2000	Kitt Peak	Spacewatch	·	1.4 km	MPC · JPL
222220	2000 FP_{6}	—	March 25, 2000	Kitt Peak	Spacewatch	H	810 m	MPC · JPL
222221	2000 FE_{14}	—	March 30, 2000	Kitt Peak	Spacewatch	PHO	1.5 km	MPC · JPL
222222	2000 FK_{15}	—	March 29, 2000	Socorro	LINEAR	PHO	1.9 km	MPC · JPL
222223	2000 FL_{20}	—	March 29, 2000	Socorro	LINEAR	·	6.2 km	MPC · JPL
222224	2000 FA_{43}	—	March 28, 2000	Socorro	LINEAR	·	2.0 km	MPC · JPL
222225	2000 FA_{56}	—	March 29, 2000	Socorro	LINEAR	·	4.4 km	MPC · JPL
222226	2000 FV_{59}	—	March 29, 2000	Socorro	LINEAR	·	1.9 km	MPC · JPL
222227	2000 GH	—	April 1, 2000	Kitt Peak	Spacewatch	NYS	1.5 km	MPC · JPL
222228	2000 GO_{4}	—	April 4, 2000	Socorro	LINEAR	T_{j} (2.99)	7.1 km	MPC · JPL
222229	2000 GQ_{25}	—	April 5, 2000	Socorro	LINEAR	MAS	1.3 km	MPC · JPL
222230	2000 GM_{34}	—	April 5, 2000	Socorro	LINEAR	ERI	2.7 km	MPC · JPL
222231	2000 GH_{117}	—	April 2, 2000	Kitt Peak	Spacewatch	MAS	920 m	MPC · JPL
222232	2000 GY_{117}	—	April 2, 2000	Kitt Peak	Spacewatch	·	1.7 km	MPC · JPL
222233	2000 GA_{128}	—	April 3, 2000	Kitt Peak	Spacewatch	·	1.5 km	MPC · JPL
222234	2000 GV_{132}	—	April 12, 2000	Prescott	P. G. Comba	JUN	1.6 km	MPC · JPL
222235	2000 GT_{151}	—	April 5, 2000	Kitt Peak	Spacewatch	PHO	3.2 km	MPC · JPL
222236	2000 GW_{171}	—	April 2, 2000	Anderson Mesa	LONEOS	PHO	1.4 km	MPC · JPL
222237	2000 GO_{177}	—	April 3, 2000	Anderson Mesa	LONEOS	MAS	940 m	MPC · JPL
222238	2000 HB_{6}	—	April 24, 2000	Kitt Peak	Spacewatch	MAS	1.1 km	MPC · JPL
222239	2000 HN_{20}	—	April 29, 2000	Socorro	LINEAR	PHO	1.4 km	MPC · JPL
222240	2000 HB_{84}	—	April 30, 2000	Anderson Mesa	LONEOS	T_{j} (2.95)	8.8 km	MPC · JPL
222241	2000 HY_{90}	—	April 30, 2000	Socorro	LINEAR	T_{j} (2.98) · EUP	8.4 km	MPC · JPL
222242	2000 JU_{34}	—	May 7, 2000	Socorro	LINEAR	·	2.0 km	MPC · JPL
222243	2000 KE_{22}	—	May 28, 2000	Socorro	LINEAR	·	1.8 km	MPC · JPL
222244	2000 LT_{21}	—	June 8, 2000	Socorro	LINEAR	EUN	2.1 km	MPC · JPL
222245	2000 LN_{26}	—	June 1, 2000	Socorro	LINEAR	·	2.0 km	MPC · JPL
222246	2000 NT_{6}	—	July 4, 2000	Kitt Peak	Spacewatch	·	1.9 km	MPC · JPL
222247	2000 OC_{41}	—	July 30, 2000	Socorro	LINEAR	·	3.8 km	MPC · JPL
222248	2000 OA_{58}	—	July 29, 2000	Anderson Mesa	LONEOS	·	2.0 km	MPC · JPL
222249 Itsuki	2000 PP_{4}	Itsuki	August 3, 2000	Kuma Kogen	A. Nakamura	·	2.1 km	MPC · JPL
222250	2000 QO_{28}	—	August 24, 2000	Socorro	LINEAR	·	3.1 km	MPC · JPL
222251	2000 QN_{29}	—	August 24, 2000	Socorro	LINEAR	EUN	2.1 km	MPC · JPL
222252	2000 QX_{34}	—	August 20, 2000	Anderson Mesa	LONEOS	·	4.8 km	MPC · JPL
222253	2000 QD_{39}	—	August 24, 2000	Socorro	LINEAR	·	2.4 km	MPC · JPL
222254	2000 QC_{66}	—	August 28, 2000	Socorro	LINEAR	·	2.9 km	MPC · JPL
222255	2000 QJ_{67}	—	August 28, 2000	Socorro	LINEAR	·	2.0 km	MPC · JPL
222256	2000 QK_{71}	—	August 24, 2000	Socorro	LINEAR	LEO	3.9 km	MPC · JPL
222257	2000 QC_{116}	—	August 26, 2000	Socorro	LINEAR	·	1.7 km	MPC · JPL
222258	2000 QU_{158}	—	August 31, 2000	Socorro	LINEAR	·	2.9 km	MPC · JPL
222259	2000 QD_{165}	—	August 31, 2000	Socorro	LINEAR	EUN	2.2 km	MPC · JPL
222260	2000 QT_{167}	—	August 31, 2000	Socorro	LINEAR	·	3.6 km	MPC · JPL
222261	2000 QC_{171}	—	August 31, 2000	Socorro	LINEAR	·	3.3 km	MPC · JPL
222262	2000 QY_{172}	—	August 31, 2000	Socorro	LINEAR	JUN	1.7 km	MPC · JPL
222263	2000 QZ_{173}	—	August 31, 2000	Socorro	LINEAR	·	3.0 km	MPC · JPL
222264	2000 QU_{175}	—	August 31, 2000	Socorro	LINEAR	·	2.2 km	MPC · JPL
222265	2000 QK_{183}	—	August 24, 2000	Socorro	LINEAR	·	2.4 km	MPC · JPL
222266	2000 QH_{193}	—	August 29, 2000	Socorro	LINEAR	EUN	2.0 km	MPC · JPL
222267	2000 QB_{214}	—	August 31, 2000	Socorro	LINEAR	·	3.2 km	MPC · JPL
222268	2000 RS_{1}	—	September 1, 2000	Socorro	LINEAR	JUN	1.8 km	MPC · JPL
222269	2000 RL_{13}	—	September 1, 2000	Socorro	LINEAR	·	2.7 km	MPC · JPL
222270	2000 RN_{39}	—	September 1, 2000	Socorro	LINEAR	JUN	1.3 km	MPC · JPL
222271	2000 RJ_{49}	—	September 5, 2000	Socorro	LINEAR	·	2.6 km	MPC · JPL
222272	2000 RD_{57}	—	September 7, 2000	Kitt Peak	Spacewatch	NEM	2.9 km	MPC · JPL
222273	2000 RQ_{79}	—	September 1, 2000	Socorro	LINEAR	·	3.9 km	MPC · JPL
222274	2000 RE_{83}	—	September 1, 2000	Socorro	LINEAR	·	2.4 km	MPC · JPL
222275	2000 RW_{97}	—	September 5, 2000	Anderson Mesa	LONEOS	·	5.6 km	MPC · JPL
222276	2000 SY_{6}	—	September 22, 2000	Socorro	LINEAR	·	3.0 km	MPC · JPL
222277	2000 SW_{35}	—	September 24, 2000	Socorro	LINEAR	·	2.8 km	MPC · JPL
222278	2000 SJ_{39}	—	September 24, 2000	Socorro	LINEAR	JUN	1.9 km	MPC · JPL
222279	2000 SL_{41}	—	September 24, 2000	Socorro	LINEAR	·	3.1 km	MPC · JPL
222280	2000 SU_{46}	—	September 23, 2000	Socorro	LINEAR	·	3.0 km	MPC · JPL
222281	2000 SF_{55}	—	September 24, 2000	Socorro	LINEAR	·	3.4 km	MPC · JPL
222282	2000 SS_{63}	—	September 24, 2000	Socorro	LINEAR	·	2.2 km	MPC · JPL
222283	2000 SJ_{82}	—	September 24, 2000	Socorro	LINEAR	ADE	4.0 km	MPC · JPL
222284	2000 SD_{92}	—	September 23, 2000	Socorro	LINEAR	·	3.2 km	MPC · JPL
222285	2000 SF_{96}	—	September 23, 2000	Socorro	LINEAR	EUN	2.3 km	MPC · JPL
222286	2000 SR_{103}	—	September 24, 2000	Socorro	LINEAR	·	2.4 km	MPC · JPL
222287	2000 SM_{125}	—	September 24, 2000	Socorro	LINEAR	·	3.3 km	MPC · JPL
222288	2000 SJ_{130}	—	September 22, 2000	Socorro	LINEAR	EUN	2.1 km	MPC · JPL
222289	2000 SZ_{136}	—	September 23, 2000	Socorro	LINEAR	·	3.5 km	MPC · JPL
222290	2000 SM_{151}	—	September 24, 2000	Socorro	LINEAR	·	2.3 km	MPC · JPL
222291	2000 SY_{152}	—	September 24, 2000	Socorro	LINEAR	·	2.9 km	MPC · JPL
222292	2000 SS_{166}	—	September 23, 2000	Socorro	LINEAR	·	4.3 km	MPC · JPL
222293	2000 SP_{168}	—	September 23, 2000	Socorro	LINEAR	·	2.1 km	MPC · JPL
222294	2000 SC_{175}	—	September 28, 2000	Socorro	LINEAR	·	2.4 km	MPC · JPL
222295	2000 SJ_{191}	—	September 24, 2000	Socorro	LINEAR	·	1.9 km	MPC · JPL
222296	2000 SU_{211}	—	September 25, 2000	Socorro	LINEAR	·	2.7 km	MPC · JPL
222297	2000 SL_{245}	—	September 24, 2000	Socorro	LINEAR	(21344)	2.3 km	MPC · JPL
222298	2000 SO_{249}	—	September 24, 2000	Socorro	LINEAR	·	3.1 km	MPC · JPL
222299	2000 SF_{252}	—	September 24, 2000	Socorro	LINEAR	NEM	4.4 km	MPC · JPL
222300	2000 SD_{267}	—	September 27, 2000	Socorro	LINEAR	·	2.4 km	MPC · JPL

== 222301–222400 ==
back to top

Designation			Discovery			Properties		Ref
Permanent	Provisional	Named after	Date	Site	Discoverer(s)	Category	Diam.	Ref
222301	2000 SD_{273}	—	September 28, 2000	Socorro	LINEAR	·	2.2 km	MPC · JPL
222302	2000 SP_{281}	—	September 23, 2000	Socorro	LINEAR	·	2.5 km	MPC · JPL
222303	2000 SG_{284}	—	September 23, 2000	Socorro	LINEAR	·	2.9 km	MPC · JPL
222304	2000 SN_{289}	—	September 27, 2000	Socorro	LINEAR	·	2.7 km	MPC · JPL
222305	2000 SP_{290}	—	September 27, 2000	Socorro	LINEAR	·	3.2 km	MPC · JPL
222306	2000 SU_{290}	—	September 27, 2000	Socorro	LINEAR	·	3.7 km	MPC · JPL
222307	2000 SJ_{292}	—	September 27, 2000	Socorro	LINEAR	·	3.3 km	MPC · JPL
222308	2000 SA_{298}	—	September 28, 2000	Socorro	LINEAR	·	3.6 km	MPC · JPL
222309	2000 SJ_{299}	—	September 28, 2000	Socorro	LINEAR	PAD	3.4 km	MPC · JPL
222310	2000 SP_{299}	—	September 28, 2000	Socorro	LINEAR	·	3.2 km	MPC · JPL
222311	2000 SW_{308}	—	September 30, 2000	Socorro	LINEAR	·	3.0 km	MPC · JPL
222312	2000 SU_{347}	—	September 22, 2000	Socorro	LINEAR	·	3.2 km	MPC · JPL
222313	2000 SQ_{356}	—	September 29, 2000	Anderson Mesa	LONEOS	·	3.4 km	MPC · JPL
222314	2000 SB_{366}	—	September 23, 2000	Anderson Mesa	LONEOS	·	2.3 km	MPC · JPL
222315	2000 ST_{367}	—	September 23, 2000	Anderson Mesa	LONEOS	·	2.3 km	MPC · JPL
222316	2000 SY_{371}	—	September 24, 2000	Anderson Mesa	LONEOS	·	3.5 km	MPC · JPL
222317	2000 TE_{1}	—	October 1, 2000	Socorro	LINEAR	·	2.0 km	MPC · JPL
222318	2000 TB_{13}	—	October 1, 2000	Socorro	LINEAR	·	2.7 km	MPC · JPL
222319	2000 TF_{26}	—	October 1, 2000	Socorro	LINEAR	AGN	1.4 km	MPC · JPL
222320	2000 TK_{44}	—	October 1, 2000	Socorro	LINEAR	·	4.4 km	MPC · JPL
222321	2000 TP_{47}	—	October 1, 2000	Anderson Mesa	LONEOS	·	2.8 km	MPC · JPL
222322	2000 TS_{57}	—	October 2, 2000	Socorro	LINEAR	·	2.5 km	MPC · JPL
222323	2000 TE_{73}	—	October 1, 2000	Apache Point	SDSS	·	2.6 km	MPC · JPL
222324	2000 UB_{14}	—	October 27, 2000	Kitt Peak	Spacewatch	·	2.6 km	MPC · JPL
222325	2000 UH_{15}	—	October 27, 2000	Socorro	LINEAR	EUN	2.4 km	MPC · JPL
222326	2000 UF_{18}	—	October 24, 2000	Socorro	LINEAR	·	3.0 km	MPC · JPL
222327	2000 UW_{35}	—	October 24, 2000	Socorro	LINEAR	·	3.1 km	MPC · JPL
222328	2000 UQ_{38}	—	October 24, 2000	Socorro	LINEAR	GEF · slow	2.0 km	MPC · JPL
222329	2000 UV_{64}	—	October 25, 2000	Socorro	LINEAR	·	3.6 km	MPC · JPL
222330	2000 UD_{66}	—	October 25, 2000	Socorro	LINEAR	·	2.9 km	MPC · JPL
222331	2000 UL_{72}	—	October 25, 2000	Socorro	LINEAR	·	2.8 km	MPC · JPL
222332	2000 UT_{72}	—	October 25, 2000	Socorro	LINEAR	·	4.0 km	MPC · JPL
222333	2000 UF_{80}	—	October 24, 2000	Socorro	LINEAR	·	2.0 km	MPC · JPL
222334	2000 UK_{81}	—	October 24, 2000	Socorro	LINEAR	·	3.1 km	MPC · JPL
222335	2000 UO_{92}	—	October 25, 2000	Socorro	LINEAR	·	3.0 km	MPC · JPL
222336	2000 UG_{96}	—	October 25, 2000	Socorro	LINEAR	DOR	4.9 km	MPC · JPL
222337	2000 UT_{98}	—	October 25, 2000	Socorro	LINEAR	·	3.0 km	MPC · JPL
222338	2000 UN_{103}	—	October 25, 2000	Socorro	LINEAR	·	3.0 km	MPC · JPL
222339	2000 VM_{3}	—	November 1, 2000	Socorro	LINEAR	·	1.1 km	MPC · JPL
222340	2000 VU_{12}	—	November 1, 2000	Socorro	LINEAR	·	2.7 km	MPC · JPL
222341	2000 VH_{51}	—	November 3, 2000	Socorro	LINEAR	·	1.9 km	MPC · JPL
222342	2000 WX_{9}	—	November 22, 2000	Eskridge	G. Hug	·	3.7 km	MPC · JPL
222343	2000 WC_{10}	—	November 23, 2000	Bisei SG Center	BATTeRS	·	2.5 km	MPC · JPL
222344	2000 WS_{30}	—	November 20, 2000	Socorro	LINEAR	EUN	2.7 km	MPC · JPL
222345	2000 WJ_{51}	—	November 26, 2000	Kitt Peak	Spacewatch	PAD	2.9 km	MPC · JPL
222346	2000 WS_{65}	—	November 28, 2000	Kitt Peak	Spacewatch	AGN	1.9 km	MPC · JPL
222347	2000 WX_{73}	—	November 20, 2000	Socorro	LINEAR	·	2.2 km	MPC · JPL
222348	2000 WT_{76}	—	November 20, 2000	Socorro	LINEAR	·	3.4 km	MPC · JPL
222349	2000 WR_{97}	—	November 21, 2000	Socorro	LINEAR	·	4.7 km	MPC · JPL
222350	2000 WP_{100}	—	November 21, 2000	Socorro	LINEAR	HOF	4.7 km	MPC · JPL
222351	2000 WL_{128}	—	November 18, 2000	Kitt Peak	Spacewatch	·	2.5 km	MPC · JPL
222352	2000 WP_{128}	—	November 18, 2000	Kitt Peak	Spacewatch	·	2.7 km	MPC · JPL
222353	2000 WX_{128}	—	November 19, 2000	Kitt Peak	Spacewatch	EUN	2.7 km	MPC · JPL
222354	2000 WZ_{136}	—	November 20, 2000	Kitt Peak	Spacewatch	·	3.4 km	MPC · JPL
222355	2000 WU_{146}	—	November 27, 2000	Haleakala	NEAT	·	3.3 km	MPC · JPL
222356	2000 WL_{150}	—	November 29, 2000	Kitt Peak	Spacewatch	·	3.5 km	MPC · JPL
222357	2000 WJ_{165}	—	November 23, 2000	Haleakala	NEAT	·	3.7 km	MPC · JPL
222358	2000 WP_{181}	—	November 22, 2000	Haleakala	NEAT	·	3.7 km	MPC · JPL
222359	2000 XN_{2}	—	December 1, 2000	Socorro	LINEAR	DOR	2.8 km	MPC · JPL
222360	2000 XR_{11}	—	December 4, 2000	Socorro	LINEAR	·	3.7 km	MPC · JPL
222361	2000 XB_{22}	—	December 4, 2000	Socorro	LINEAR	WAT	2.9 km	MPC · JPL
222362	2000 XO_{23}	—	December 4, 2000	Socorro	LINEAR	·	3.2 km	MPC · JPL
222363	2000 XH_{27}	—	December 4, 2000	Socorro	LINEAR	·	2.1 km	MPC · JPL
222364	2000 XJ_{31}	—	December 4, 2000	Socorro	LINEAR	·	3.6 km	MPC · JPL
222365	2000 XK_{31}	—	December 4, 2000	Socorro	LINEAR	·	3.1 km	MPC · JPL
222366	2000 XM_{34}	—	December 4, 2000	Socorro	LINEAR	·	2.1 km	MPC · JPL
222367	2000 XC_{42}	—	December 5, 2000	Socorro	LINEAR	·	3.2 km	MPC · JPL
222368	2000 YD_{3}	—	December 18, 2000	Kitt Peak	Spacewatch	KOR	1.9 km	MPC · JPL
222369	2000 YZ_{12}	—	December 23, 2000	Haleakala	NEAT	·	4.0 km	MPC · JPL
222370	2000 YK_{56}	—	December 30, 2000	Socorro	LINEAR	slow	3.3 km	MPC · JPL
222371	2000 YH_{78}	—	December 30, 2000	Socorro	LINEAR	·	2.3 km	MPC · JPL
222372	2000 YS_{80}	—	December 30, 2000	Socorro	LINEAR	(32418)	1.7 km	MPC · JPL
222373	2000 YQ_{122}	—	December 28, 2000	Socorro	LINEAR	·	2.1 km	MPC · JPL
222374	2000 YV_{127}	—	December 29, 2000	Kitt Peak	Spacewatch	·	4.9 km	MPC · JPL
222375	2000 YW_{132}	—	December 30, 2000	Kitt Peak	Spacewatch	·	1.0 km	MPC · JPL
222376	2001 AC_{31}	—	January 4, 2001	Socorro	LINEAR	·	5.8 km	MPC · JPL
222377	2001 BH_{8}	—	January 19, 2001	Socorro	LINEAR	·	1.5 km	MPC · JPL
222378	2001 BE_{29}	—	January 20, 2001	Socorro	LINEAR	EOS	3.2 km	MPC · JPL
222379	2001 BU_{56}	—	January 19, 2001	Kitt Peak	Spacewatch	L4	10 km	MPC · JPL
222380	2001 CN_{44}	—	February 15, 2001	Socorro	LINEAR	·	4.1 km	MPC · JPL
222381	2001 DZ_{16}	—	February 16, 2001	Socorro	LINEAR	·	3.3 km	MPC · JPL
222382	2001 DK_{23}	—	February 17, 2001	Socorro	LINEAR	EUP	5.8 km	MPC · JPL
222383	2001 DZ_{47}	—	February 19, 2001	Nogales	Tenagra II	EOS	2.7 km	MPC · JPL
222384	2001 DO_{48}	—	February 16, 2001	Socorro	LINEAR	L4	20 km	MPC · JPL
222385	2001 DM_{61}	—	February 19, 2001	Socorro	LINEAR	·	960 m	MPC · JPL
222386	2001 DL_{65}	—	February 19, 2001	Socorro	LINEAR	EOS	3.0 km	MPC · JPL
222387	2001 DU_{66}	—	February 19, 2001	Socorro	LINEAR	·	2.8 km	MPC · JPL
222388	2001 DZ_{72}	—	February 19, 2001	Socorro	LINEAR	·	2.9 km	MPC · JPL
222389	2001 DA_{77}	—	February 21, 2001	Haleakala	NEAT	·	650 m	MPC · JPL
222390	2001 DR_{97}	—	February 17, 2001	Socorro	LINEAR	·	4.4 km	MPC · JPL
222391	2001 DT_{98}	—	February 17, 2001	Socorro	LINEAR	·	4.0 km	MPC · JPL
222392	2001 EV	—	March 2, 2001	Haleakala	NEAT	·	4.1 km	MPC · JPL
222393	2001 EY_{9}	—	March 2, 2001	Anderson Mesa	LONEOS	·	1.1 km	MPC · JPL
222394	2001 EW_{10}	—	March 2, 2001	Haleakala	NEAT	·	1.0 km	MPC · JPL
222395	2001 EA_{13}	—	March 1, 2001	Socorro	LINEAR	H	850 m	MPC · JPL
222396	2001 EV_{23}	—	March 15, 2001	Haleakala	NEAT	·	2.0 km	MPC · JPL
222397	2001 EM_{26}	—	March 2, 2001	Anderson Mesa	LONEOS	·	890 m	MPC · JPL
222398	2001 FQ_{11}	—	March 19, 2001	Anderson Mesa	LONEOS	·	5.0 km	MPC · JPL
222399	2001 FW_{12}	—	March 19, 2001	Anderson Mesa	LONEOS	EMA	4.9 km	MPC · JPL
222400	2001 FJ_{15}	—	March 19, 2001	Anderson Mesa	LONEOS	·	1.0 km	MPC · JPL

== 222401–222500 ==
back to top

Designation			Discovery			Properties		Ref
Permanent	Provisional	Named after	Date	Site	Discoverer(s)	Category	Diam.	Ref
222401	2001 FV_{17}	—	March 19, 2001	Anderson Mesa	LONEOS	(43176)	5.0 km	MPC · JPL
222402	2001 FR_{26}	—	March 18, 2001	Socorro	LINEAR	·	5.3 km	MPC · JPL
222403 Bethchristie	2001 FK_{31}	Bethchristie	March 22, 2001	Junk Bond	D. Healy	THM	2.9 km	MPC · JPL
222404	2001 FQ_{47}	—	March 18, 2001	Socorro	LINEAR	·	5.9 km	MPC · JPL
222405	2001 FZ_{61}	—	March 19, 2001	Socorro	LINEAR	·	3.7 km	MPC · JPL
222406	2001 FH_{72}	—	March 19, 2001	Socorro	LINEAR	·	4.6 km	MPC · JPL
222407	2001 FW_{90}	—	March 26, 2001	Socorro	LINEAR	T_{j} (2.98)	6.3 km	MPC · JPL
222408	2001 FA_{103}	—	March 18, 2001	Socorro	LINEAR	·	5.0 km	MPC · JPL
222409	2001 FS_{104}	—	March 18, 2001	Anderson Mesa	LONEOS	·	1.5 km	MPC · JPL
222410	2001 FB_{112}	—	March 18, 2001	Kitt Peak	Spacewatch	EOS	3.0 km	MPC · JPL
222411	2001 FF_{130}	—	March 29, 2001	Socorro	LINEAR	·	2.3 km	MPC · JPL
222412	2001 FB_{133}	—	March 20, 2001	Haleakala	NEAT	·	4.0 km	MPC · JPL
222413	2001 FM_{156}	—	March 26, 2001	Haleakala	NEAT	·	990 m	MPC · JPL
222414	2001 FU_{163}	—	March 18, 2001	Anderson Mesa	LONEOS	·	2.4 km	MPC · JPL
222415	2001 FB_{172}	—	March 24, 2001	Haleakala	NEAT	·	7.0 km	MPC · JPL
222416	2001 GU_{7}	—	April 15, 2001	Socorro	LINEAR	·	1.8 km	MPC · JPL
222417	2001 HS_{32}	—	April 23, 2001	Socorro	LINEAR	·	3.8 km	MPC · JPL
222418	2001 HM_{46}	—	April 18, 2001	Socorro	LINEAR	·	1.9 km	MPC · JPL
222419	2001 JF_{11}	—	May 3, 2001	Haleakala	NEAT	·	1.3 km	MPC · JPL
222420	2001 KW_{27}	—	May 17, 2001	Socorro	LINEAR	·	2.0 km	MPC · JPL
222421	2001 KD_{52}	—	May 17, 2001	Kitt Peak	Spacewatch	·	1.9 km	MPC · JPL
222422	2001 KL_{53}	—	May 18, 2001	Socorro	LINEAR	·	1.2 km	MPC · JPL
222423	2001 KF_{71}	—	May 24, 2001	Anderson Mesa	LONEOS	·	6.6 km	MPC · JPL
222424	2001 MO_{10}	—	June 20, 2001	Palomar	NEAT	·	1.9 km	MPC · JPL
222425	2001 OV	—	July 17, 2001	Haleakala	NEAT	·	1.5 km	MPC · JPL
222426	2001 OX_{14}	—	July 18, 2001	Palomar	NEAT	H	1.0 km	MPC · JPL
222427	2001 OK_{38}	—	July 20, 2001	Palomar	NEAT	HIL · 3:2	8.7 km	MPC · JPL
222428	2001 OB_{67}	—	July 25, 2001	Haleakala	NEAT	·	2.1 km	MPC · JPL
222429	2001 OQ_{101}	—	July 28, 2001	Anderson Mesa	LONEOS	PHO	2.0 km	MPC · JPL
222430	2001 PU_{10}	—	August 8, 2001	Haleakala	NEAT	NYS	1.6 km	MPC · JPL
222431	2001 PG_{35}	—	August 11, 2001	Palomar	NEAT	·	1.6 km	MPC · JPL
222432	2001 PP_{53}	—	August 14, 2001	Palomar	NEAT	·	1.9 km	MPC · JPL
222433	2001 QB	—	August 16, 2001	Badlands	Badlands	NYS	1.3 km	MPC · JPL
222434	2001 QQ_{2}	—	August 17, 2001	Socorro	LINEAR	·	3.1 km	MPC · JPL
222435	2001 QW_{4}	—	August 16, 2001	Socorro	LINEAR	NYS	1.4 km	MPC · JPL
222436	2001 QU_{14}	—	August 16, 2001	Socorro	LINEAR	PHO	3.0 km	MPC · JPL
222437	2001 QZ_{19}	—	August 16, 2001	Socorro	LINEAR	·	3.3 km	MPC · JPL
222438	2001 QQ_{44}	—	August 16, 2001	Socorro	LINEAR	·	1.6 km	MPC · JPL
222439	2001 QW_{46}	—	August 16, 2001	Socorro	LINEAR	MAS	960 m	MPC · JPL
222440	2001 QY_{59}	—	August 18, 2001	Socorro	LINEAR	H	820 m	MPC · JPL
222441	2001 QD_{91}	—	August 22, 2001	Socorro	LINEAR	H	660 m	MPC · JPL
222442	2001 QM_{100}	—	August 22, 2001	Haleakala	NEAT	H	730 m	MPC · JPL
222443	2001 QH_{107}	—	August 23, 2001	Socorro	LINEAR	H	720 m	MPC · JPL
222444	2001 QJ_{121}	—	August 19, 2001	Socorro	LINEAR	·	1.8 km	MPC · JPL
222445	2001 QF_{152}	—	August 26, 2001	Socorro	LINEAR	·	2.8 km	MPC · JPL
222446	2001 QN_{160}	—	August 23, 2001	Anderson Mesa	LONEOS	MAS	800 m	MPC · JPL
222447	2001 QL_{165}	—	August 24, 2001	Haleakala	NEAT	·	2.0 km	MPC · JPL
222448	2001 QJ_{170}	—	August 23, 2001	Socorro	LINEAR	H	1.1 km	MPC · JPL
222449	2001 QR_{173}	—	August 25, 2001	Socorro	LINEAR	·	1.9 km	MPC · JPL
222450	2001 QM_{210}	—	August 23, 2001	Desert Eagle	W. K. Y. Yeung	T_{j} (2.99) · 3:2	7.3 km	MPC · JPL
222451	2001 QH_{214}	—	August 23, 2001	Anderson Mesa	LONEOS	MAS	930 m	MPC · JPL
222452	2001 QL_{252}	—	August 25, 2001	Socorro	LINEAR	·	1.7 km	MPC · JPL
222453	2001 QW_{253}	—	August 25, 2001	Anderson Mesa	LONEOS	·	1.8 km	MPC · JPL
222454	2001 QM_{279}	—	August 19, 2001	Socorro	LINEAR	T_{j} (2.97) · HIL · 3:2	6.9 km	MPC · JPL
222455	2001 QH_{292}	—	August 16, 2001	Socorro	LINEAR	·	2.4 km	MPC · JPL
222456	2001 RR_{7}	—	September 8, 2001	Socorro	LINEAR	·	1.5 km	MPC · JPL
222457	2001 RD_{14}	—	September 10, 2001	Socorro	LINEAR	MAS	1.0 km	MPC · JPL
222458	2001 RL_{25}	—	September 7, 2001	Socorro	LINEAR	·	1.9 km	MPC · JPL
222459	2001 RO_{27}	—	September 7, 2001	Socorro	LINEAR	SUL	3.2 km	MPC · JPL
222460	2001 RW_{34}	—	September 8, 2001	Socorro	LINEAR	·	2.3 km	MPC · JPL
222461	2001 RR_{47}	—	September 12, 2001	Socorro	LINEAR	H	760 m	MPC · JPL
222462	2001 RC_{80}	—	September 9, 2001	Palomar	NEAT	·	2.1 km	MPC · JPL
222463	2001 RN_{82}	—	September 11, 2001	Anderson Mesa	LONEOS	·	2.4 km	MPC · JPL
222464	2001 RH_{84}	—	September 11, 2001	Anderson Mesa	LONEOS	·	1.8 km	MPC · JPL
222465	2001 RG_{98}	—	September 12, 2001	Kitt Peak	Spacewatch	·	1.3 km	MPC · JPL
222466	2001 RP_{103}	—	September 12, 2001	Socorro	LINEAR	·	2.2 km	MPC · JPL
222467	2001 RA_{106}	—	September 12, 2001	Socorro	LINEAR	·	1.7 km	MPC · JPL
222468	2001 RB_{110}	—	September 12, 2001	Socorro	LINEAR	·	1.2 km	MPC · JPL
222469	2001 RW_{126}	—	September 12, 2001	Socorro	LINEAR	·	2.0 km	MPC · JPL
222470	2001 RX_{154}	—	September 12, 2001	Socorro	LINEAR	V	1.1 km	MPC · JPL
222471	2001 SF_{14}	—	September 16, 2001	Socorro	LINEAR	·	1.4 km	MPC · JPL
222472	2001 SC_{15}	—	September 16, 2001	Socorro	LINEAR	·	1.5 km	MPC · JPL
222473	2001 SN_{18}	—	September 16, 2001	Socorro	LINEAR	HIL · 3:2	7.6 km	MPC · JPL
222474	2001 SE_{21}	—	September 16, 2001	Socorro	LINEAR	·	1.4 km	MPC · JPL
222475	2001 ST_{55}	—	September 16, 2001	Socorro	LINEAR	·	2.6 km	MPC · JPL
222476	2001 SN_{82}	—	September 20, 2001	Socorro	LINEAR	·	2.3 km	MPC · JPL
222477	2001 SG_{84}	—	September 20, 2001	Socorro	LINEAR	·	1.5 km	MPC · JPL
222478	2001 SE_{87}	—	September 20, 2001	Socorro	LINEAR	·	1.7 km	MPC · JPL
222479	2001 SH_{89}	—	September 20, 2001	Socorro	LINEAR	·	1.6 km	MPC · JPL
222480	2001 SV_{91}	—	September 20, 2001	Socorro	LINEAR	SUL	2.7 km	MPC · JPL
222481	2001 SZ_{107}	—	September 20, 2001	Socorro	LINEAR	·	2.0 km	MPC · JPL
222482	2001 SX_{109}	—	September 20, 2001	Socorro	LINEAR	H	870 m	MPC · JPL
222483	2001 SH_{122}	—	September 16, 2001	Socorro	LINEAR	·	2.0 km	MPC · JPL
222484	2001 SW_{134}	—	September 16, 2001	Socorro	LINEAR	·	1 km	MPC · JPL
222485	2001 SH_{147}	—	September 16, 2001	Socorro	LINEAR	HNS	1.3 km	MPC · JPL
222486	2001 SP_{154}	—	September 17, 2001	Socorro	LINEAR	V	1.3 km	MPC · JPL
222487	2001 SZ_{165}	—	September 19, 2001	Socorro	LINEAR	MAS	930 m	MPC · JPL
222488	2001 SF_{174}	—	September 16, 2001	Socorro	LINEAR	3:2 · SHU	7.9 km	MPC · JPL
222489	2001 SO_{181}	—	September 19, 2001	Socorro	LINEAR	MAS	930 m	MPC · JPL
222490	2001 SA_{227}	—	September 19, 2001	Socorro	LINEAR	T_{j} (2.99) · 3:2 · SHU	6.2 km	MPC · JPL
222491	2001 SJ_{234}	—	September 19, 2001	Socorro	LINEAR	·	1.8 km	MPC · JPL
222492	2001 SF_{246}	—	September 19, 2001	Socorro	LINEAR	·	1.1 km	MPC · JPL
222493	2001 SC_{249}	—	September 19, 2001	Socorro	LINEAR	·	2.4 km	MPC · JPL
222494	2001 SV_{251}	—	September 19, 2001	Socorro	LINEAR	·	1.3 km	MPC · JPL
222495	2001 SJ_{264}	—	September 25, 2001	Socorro	LINEAR	H ·	580 m	MPC · JPL
222496	2001 SC_{276}	—	September 26, 2001	Socorro	LINEAR	H	920 m	MPC · JPL
222497	2001 SJ_{282}	—	September 27, 2001	Socorro	LINEAR	·	2.5 km	MPC · JPL
222498	2001 SQ_{293}	—	September 19, 2001	Socorro	LINEAR	·	900 m	MPC · JPL
222499	2001 SN_{302}	—	September 20, 2001	Socorro	LINEAR	·	1.1 km	MPC · JPL
222500	2001 SF_{313}	—	September 21, 2001	Socorro	LINEAR	·	1.7 km	MPC · JPL

== 222501–222600 ==
back to top

Designation			Discovery			Properties		Ref
Permanent	Provisional	Named after	Date	Site	Discoverer(s)	Category	Diam.	Ref
222501	2001 ST_{315}	—	September 25, 2001	Socorro	LINEAR	·	4.4 km	MPC · JPL
222502	2001 TK_{5}	—	October 10, 2001	Palomar	NEAT	·	2.3 km	MPC · JPL
222503	2001 TE_{9}	—	October 9, 2001	Socorro	LINEAR	RAF	2.1 km	MPC · JPL
222504	2001 TQ_{11}	—	October 13, 2001	Socorro	LINEAR	·	1.7 km	MPC · JPL
222505	2001 TJ_{13}	—	October 14, 2001	Socorro	LINEAR	H	810 m	MPC · JPL
222506	2001 TN_{13}	—	October 14, 2001	Socorro	LINEAR	H	940 m	MPC · JPL
222507	2001 TV_{15}	—	October 11, 2001	Socorro	LINEAR	·	2.9 km	MPC · JPL
222508	2001 TS_{25}	—	October 14, 2001	Socorro	LINEAR	(5)	1.3 km	MPC · JPL
222509	2001 TR_{44}	—	October 14, 2001	Socorro	LINEAR	·	1.6 km	MPC · JPL
222510	2001 TJ_{46}	—	October 15, 2001	Socorro	LINEAR	H	770 m	MPC · JPL
222511	2001 TX_{47}	—	October 14, 2001	Cima Ekar	ADAS	·	1.8 km	MPC · JPL
222512	2001 TU_{56}	—	October 13, 2001	Socorro	LINEAR	H	800 m	MPC · JPL
222513	2001 TM_{66}	—	October 13, 2001	Socorro	LINEAR	(5)	1.6 km	MPC · JPL
222514	2001 TA_{86}	—	October 14, 2001	Socorro	LINEAR	·	1.4 km	MPC · JPL
222515	2001 TN_{90}	—	October 14, 2001	Socorro	LINEAR	·	1.8 km	MPC · JPL
222516	2001 TX_{102}	—	October 15, 2001	Socorro	LINEAR	(194)	1.5 km	MPC · JPL
222517	2001 TY_{128}	—	October 14, 2001	Kitt Peak	Spacewatch	HIL · 3:2	7.1 km	MPC · JPL
222518	2001 TQ_{139}	—	October 10, 2001	Palomar	NEAT	·	1.8 km	MPC · JPL
222519	2001 TF_{149}	—	October 10, 2001	Palomar	NEAT	·	1.5 km	MPC · JPL
222520	2001 TD_{160}	—	October 15, 2001	Haleakala	NEAT	T_{j} (2.97) · 3:2	7.3 km	MPC · JPL
222521	2001 TH_{161}	—	October 11, 2001	Palomar	NEAT	HIL · 3:2	8.3 km	MPC · JPL
222522	2001 TR_{166}	—	October 15, 2001	Socorro	LINEAR	·	2.4 km	MPC · JPL
222523	2001 TP_{175}	—	October 14, 2001	Socorro	LINEAR	·	2.9 km	MPC · JPL
222524	2001 TW_{198}	—	October 11, 2001	Socorro	LINEAR	·	1.9 km	MPC · JPL
222525	2001 TB_{228}	—	October 15, 2001	Socorro	LINEAR	·	1.7 km	MPC · JPL
222526	2001 UX	—	October 17, 2001	Socorro	LINEAR	H	800 m	MPC · JPL
222527	2001 UL_{2}	—	October 18, 2001	Socorro	LINEAR	H	740 m	MPC · JPL
222528	2001 UJ_{11}	—	October 17, 2001	Socorro	LINEAR	H	650 m	MPC · JPL
222529	2001 UY_{23}	—	October 18, 2001	Socorro	LINEAR	·	2.2 km	MPC · JPL
222530	2001 UP_{33}	—	October 16, 2001	Socorro	LINEAR	·	2.4 km	MPC · JPL
222531	2001 UC_{41}	—	October 17, 2001	Socorro	LINEAR	·	1.9 km	MPC · JPL
222532	2001 UT_{45}	—	October 17, 2001	Socorro	LINEAR	(5)	1.6 km	MPC · JPL
222533	2001 UY_{46}	—	October 17, 2001	Socorro	LINEAR	·	1.9 km	MPC · JPL
222534	2001 UD_{64}	—	October 18, 2001	Socorro	LINEAR	·	2.1 km	MPC · JPL
222535	2001 UP_{74}	—	October 17, 2001	Socorro	LINEAR	KON	3.0 km	MPC · JPL
222536	2001 UR_{136}	—	October 23, 2001	Socorro	LINEAR	H	740 m	MPC · JPL
222537	2001 UH_{140}	—	October 23, 2001	Socorro	LINEAR	·	1.7 km	MPC · JPL
222538	2001 UG_{170}	—	October 21, 2001	Socorro	LINEAR	·	2.3 km	MPC · JPL
222539	2001 UE_{171}	—	October 21, 2001	Socorro	LINEAR	·	2.9 km	MPC · JPL
222540	2001 UA_{173}	—	October 18, 2001	Palomar	NEAT	KON	2.9 km	MPC · JPL
222541	2001 UQ_{175}	—	October 18, 2001	Anderson Mesa	LONEOS	·	3.3 km	MPC · JPL
222542	2001 UX_{196}	—	October 19, 2001	Anderson Mesa	LONEOS	·	1.2 km	MPC · JPL
222543	2001 UX_{215}	—	October 23, 2001	Kitt Peak	Spacewatch	(5)	1.3 km	MPC · JPL
222544	2001 UD_{219}	—	October 18, 2001	Desert Eagle	W. K. Y. Yeung	·	2.2 km	MPC · JPL
222545	2001 UZ_{219}	—	October 18, 2001	Kitt Peak	Spacewatch	·	1.3 km	MPC · JPL
222546	2001 VS_{2}	—	November 9, 2001	Socorro	LINEAR	H	710 m	MPC · JPL
222547	2001 VX_{2}	—	November 10, 2001	Socorro	LINEAR	H	820 m	MPC · JPL
222548	2001 VE_{4}	—	November 11, 2001	Eskridge	G. Hug	·	4.2 km	MPC · JPL
222549	2001 VH_{9}	—	November 9, 2001	Socorro	LINEAR	(5)	2.0 km	MPC · JPL
222550	2001 VT_{11}	—	November 10, 2001	Socorro	LINEAR	(194)	2.0 km	MPC · JPL
222551	2001 VB_{13}	—	November 10, 2001	Socorro	LINEAR	(5)	1.6 km	MPC · JPL
222552	2001 VJ_{13}	—	November 10, 2001	Socorro	LINEAR	H	790 m	MPC · JPL
222553	2001 VQ_{24}	—	November 9, 2001	Socorro	LINEAR	·	1.3 km	MPC · JPL
222554	2001 VN_{26}	—	November 9, 2001	Socorro	LINEAR	·	1.5 km	MPC · JPL
222555	2001 VA_{28}	—	November 9, 2001	Socorro	LINEAR	(5)	2.2 km	MPC · JPL
222556	2001 VB_{32}	—	November 9, 2001	Socorro	LINEAR	·	2.4 km	MPC · JPL
222557	2001 VN_{34}	—	November 9, 2001	Socorro	LINEAR	·	2.3 km	MPC · JPL
222558	2001 VS_{36}	—	November 9, 2001	Socorro	LINEAR	·	1.5 km	MPC · JPL
222559	2001 VS_{40}	—	November 9, 2001	Socorro	LINEAR	(5)	1.5 km	MPC · JPL
222560	2001 VY_{46}	—	November 9, 2001	Socorro	LINEAR	·	2.5 km	MPC · JPL
222561	2001 VG_{62}	—	November 10, 2001	Socorro	LINEAR	(5)	1.3 km	MPC · JPL
222562	2001 VU_{65}	—	November 10, 2001	Socorro	LINEAR	·	1.3 km	MPC · JPL
222563	2001 VK_{66}	—	November 10, 2001	Socorro	LINEAR	KON	4.2 km	MPC · JPL
222564	2001 VF_{70}	—	November 11, 2001	Socorro	LINEAR	·	1.4 km	MPC · JPL
222565	2001 VK_{84}	—	November 12, 2001	Socorro	LINEAR	·	2.1 km	MPC · JPL
222566	2001 VR_{84}	—	November 12, 2001	Socorro	LINEAR	·	2.2 km	MPC · JPL
222567	2001 VP_{85}	—	November 12, 2001	Socorro	LINEAR	·	1.3 km	MPC · JPL
222568	2001 VR_{85}	—	November 12, 2001	Socorro	LINEAR	·	1.8 km	MPC · JPL
222569	2001 VD_{95}	—	November 15, 2001	Socorro	LINEAR	·	3.7 km	MPC · JPL
222570	2001 VJ_{96}	—	November 15, 2001	Socorro	LINEAR	·	2.0 km	MPC · JPL
222571	2001 VT_{107}	—	November 12, 2001	Socorro	LINEAR	KRM	4.1 km	MPC · JPL
222572	2001 VE_{114}	—	November 12, 2001	Socorro	LINEAR	(5)	1.7 km	MPC · JPL
222573	2001 VB_{121}	—	November 12, 2001	Socorro	LINEAR	·	1.8 km	MPC · JPL
222574	2001 VP_{121}	—	November 15, 2001	Palomar	NEAT	(5)	1.9 km	MPC · JPL
222575	2001 VV_{122}	—	November 11, 2001	Anderson Mesa	LONEOS	·	1.4 km	MPC · JPL
222576	2001 VX_{125}	—	November 14, 2001	Kitt Peak	Spacewatch	·	1.6 km	MPC · JPL
222577	2001 WA	—	November 16, 2001	Oizumi	T. Kobayashi	·	2.7 km	MPC · JPL
222578	2001 WX_{5}	—	November 17, 2001	Socorro	LINEAR	·	2.3 km	MPC · JPL
222579	2001 WF_{6}	—	November 17, 2001	Socorro	LINEAR	·	1.3 km	MPC · JPL
222580	2001 WT_{12}	—	November 17, 2001	Socorro	LINEAR	EUN	2.6 km	MPC · JPL
222581	2001 WW_{18}	—	November 17, 2001	Socorro	LINEAR	·	1.6 km	MPC · JPL
222582	2001 WO_{23}	—	November 16, 2001	Kitt Peak	Spacewatch	·	3.0 km	MPC · JPL
222583	2001 WT_{30}	—	November 17, 2001	Socorro	LINEAR	·	2.6 km	MPC · JPL
222584	2001 WR_{35}	—	November 17, 2001	Socorro	LINEAR	·	2.0 km	MPC · JPL
222585	2001 WC_{42}	—	November 18, 2001	Socorro	LINEAR	(5)	1.3 km	MPC · JPL
222586	2001 WW_{43}	—	November 18, 2001	Socorro	LINEAR	·	1.3 km	MPC · JPL
222587	2001 WH_{44}	—	November 18, 2001	Socorro	LINEAR	3:2	7.2 km	MPC · JPL
222588	2001 WX_{46}	—	November 19, 2001	Socorro	LINEAR	·	2.7 km	MPC · JPL
222589	2001 WB_{49}	—	November 19, 2001	Kitt Peak	Spacewatch	·	1.4 km	MPC · JPL
222590	2001 WE_{68}	—	November 20, 2001	Socorro	LINEAR	·	1.8 km	MPC · JPL
222591	2001 WG_{101}	—	November 17, 2001	Kitt Peak	Spacewatch	·	1.1 km	MPC · JPL
222592	2001 XJ_{2}	—	December 8, 2001	Socorro	LINEAR	·	2.2 km	MPC · JPL
222593	2001 XJ_{4}	—	December 10, 2001	Socorro	LINEAR	H	830 m	MPC · JPL
222594	2001 XM_{4}	—	December 10, 2001	Socorro	LINEAR	H	890 m	MPC · JPL
222595	2001 XP_{4}	—	December 10, 2001	Socorro	LINEAR	H	1.0 km	MPC · JPL
222596	2001 XB_{6}	—	December 7, 2001	Socorro	LINEAR	·	2.4 km	MPC · JPL
222597	2001 XE_{7}	—	December 7, 2001	Socorro	LINEAR	·	2.4 km	MPC · JPL
222598	2001 XT_{10}	—	December 10, 2001	Kitt Peak	Spacewatch	·	1.9 km	MPC · JPL
222599	2001 XZ_{14}	—	December 9, 2001	Socorro	LINEAR	ADE	4.8 km	MPC · JPL
222600	2001 XJ_{16}	—	December 13, 2001	Socorro	LINEAR	·	2.8 km	MPC · JPL

== 222601–222700 ==
back to top

Designation			Discovery			Properties		Ref
Permanent	Provisional	Named after	Date	Site	Discoverer(s)	Category	Diam.	Ref
222601	2001 XY_{17}	—	December 9, 2001	Socorro	LINEAR	·	2.3 km	MPC · JPL
222602	2001 XV_{21}	—	December 9, 2001	Socorro	LINEAR	MAR	1.8 km	MPC · JPL
222603	2001 XM_{23}	—	December 9, 2001	Socorro	LINEAR	·	2.6 km	MPC · JPL
222604	2001 XS_{27}	—	December 10, 2001	Socorro	LINEAR	·	2.2 km	MPC · JPL
222605	2001 XY_{28}	—	December 11, 2001	Socorro	LINEAR	·	4.9 km	MPC · JPL
222606	2001 XC_{35}	—	December 9, 2001	Socorro	LINEAR	slow	4.2 km	MPC · JPL
222607	2001 XY_{37}	—	December 9, 2001	Socorro	LINEAR	·	4.9 km	MPC · JPL
222608	2001 XT_{43}	—	December 9, 2001	Socorro	LINEAR	KON	3.4 km	MPC · JPL
222609	2001 XJ_{51}	—	December 10, 2001	Socorro	LINEAR	·	1.2 km	MPC · JPL
222610	2001 XG_{56}	—	December 11, 2001	Socorro	LINEAR	·	1.3 km	MPC · JPL
222611	2001 XJ_{57}	—	December 10, 2001	Socorro	LINEAR	·	2.2 km	MPC · JPL
222612	2001 XJ_{67}	—	December 10, 2001	Socorro	LINEAR	·	3.1 km	MPC · JPL
222613	2001 XZ_{67}	—	December 10, 2001	Socorro	LINEAR	·	1.9 km	MPC · JPL
222614	2001 XE_{70}	—	December 11, 2001	Socorro	LINEAR	(5)	1.8 km	MPC · JPL
222615	2001 XL_{70}	—	December 11, 2001	Socorro	LINEAR	(5)	1.6 km	MPC · JPL
222616	2001 XF_{74}	—	December 11, 2001	Socorro	LINEAR	·	1.6 km	MPC · JPL
222617	2001 XS_{79}	—	December 11, 2001	Socorro	LINEAR	(5)	2.6 km	MPC · JPL
222618	2001 XZ_{79}	—	December 11, 2001	Socorro	LINEAR	·	2.0 km	MPC · JPL
222619	2001 XH_{80}	—	December 11, 2001	Socorro	LINEAR	·	2.0 km	MPC · JPL
222620	2001 XV_{82}	—	December 11, 2001	Socorro	LINEAR	(5)	1.5 km	MPC · JPL
222621	2001 XH_{86}	—	December 11, 2001	Socorro	LINEAR	·	2.6 km	MPC · JPL
222622	2001 XG_{89}	—	December 10, 2001	Socorro	LINEAR	·	1.6 km	MPC · JPL
222623	2001 XZ_{92}	—	December 10, 2001	Socorro	LINEAR	(5)	1.8 km	MPC · JPL
222624	2001 XE_{93}	—	December 10, 2001	Socorro	LINEAR	·	5.0 km	MPC · JPL
222625	2001 XO_{95}	—	December 10, 2001	Socorro	LINEAR	·	1.6 km	MPC · JPL
222626	2001 XY_{105}	—	December 10, 2001	Socorro	LINEAR	·	1.9 km	MPC · JPL
222627	2001 XF_{106}	—	December 10, 2001	Socorro	LINEAR	·	1.3 km	MPC · JPL
222628	2001 XG_{108}	—	December 10, 2001	Socorro	LINEAR	EUN	2.4 km	MPC · JPL
222629	2001 XM_{108}	—	December 10, 2001	Socorro	LINEAR	·	2.1 km	MPC · JPL
222630	2001 XY_{108}	—	December 10, 2001	Socorro	LINEAR	·	1.8 km	MPC · JPL
222631	2001 XR_{114}	—	December 13, 2001	Socorro	LINEAR	·	2.0 km	MPC · JPL
222632	2001 XL_{115}	—	December 13, 2001	Socorro	LINEAR	·	3.2 km	MPC · JPL
222633	2001 XP_{115}	—	December 13, 2001	Socorro	LINEAR	·	1.9 km	MPC · JPL
222634	2001 XZ_{117}	—	December 13, 2001	Socorro	LINEAR	(5)	2.1 km	MPC · JPL
222635	2001 XN_{118}	—	December 13, 2001	Socorro	LINEAR	RAF	1.9 km	MPC · JPL
222636	2001 XP_{121}	—	December 14, 2001	Socorro	LINEAR	·	1.1 km	MPC · JPL
222637	2001 XY_{121}	—	December 14, 2001	Socorro	LINEAR	(5)	1.4 km	MPC · JPL
222638	2001 XM_{122}	—	December 14, 2001	Socorro	LINEAR	·	1.5 km	MPC · JPL
222639	2001 XZ_{124}	—	December 14, 2001	Socorro	LINEAR	·	2.3 km	MPC · JPL
222640	2001 XY_{125}	—	December 14, 2001	Socorro	LINEAR	BRG	2.1 km	MPC · JPL
222641	2001 XJ_{131}	—	December 14, 2001	Socorro	LINEAR	V	1.0 km	MPC · JPL
222642	2001 XA_{136}	—	December 14, 2001	Socorro	LINEAR	·	1.7 km	MPC · JPL
222643	2001 XZ_{137}	—	December 14, 2001	Socorro	LINEAR	·	2.2 km	MPC · JPL
222644	2001 XT_{156}	—	December 14, 2001	Socorro	LINEAR	(5)	1.3 km	MPC · JPL
222645	2001 XE_{160}	—	December 14, 2001	Socorro	LINEAR	·	2.3 km	MPC · JPL
222646	2001 XN_{169}	—	December 14, 2001	Socorro	LINEAR	·	2.6 km	MPC · JPL
222647	2001 XN_{173}	—	December 14, 2001	Socorro	LINEAR	·	2.5 km	MPC · JPL
222648	2001 XX_{173}	—	December 14, 2001	Socorro	LINEAR	·	2.0 km	MPC · JPL
222649	2001 XL_{174}	—	December 14, 2001	Socorro	LINEAR	·	1.6 km	MPC · JPL
222650	2001 XX_{174}	—	December 14, 2001	Socorro	LINEAR	·	2.1 km	MPC · JPL
222651	2001 XX_{177}	—	December 14, 2001	Socorro	LINEAR	·	2.0 km	MPC · JPL
222652	2001 XP_{182}	—	December 14, 2001	Socorro	LINEAR	EUN	1.6 km	MPC · JPL
222653	2001 XC_{184}	—	December 14, 2001	Socorro	LINEAR	(5)	1.7 km	MPC · JPL
222654	2001 XH_{185}	—	December 14, 2001	Socorro	LINEAR	·	2.3 km	MPC · JPL
222655	2001 XW_{186}	—	December 14, 2001	Socorro	LINEAR	·	1.5 km	MPC · JPL
222656	2001 XZ_{187}	—	December 14, 2001	Socorro	LINEAR	(5)	2.0 km	MPC · JPL
222657	2001 XF_{188}	—	December 14, 2001	Socorro	LINEAR	·	1.9 km	MPC · JPL
222658	2001 XJ_{194}	—	December 14, 2001	Socorro	LINEAR	·	1.7 km	MPC · JPL
222659	2001 XD_{211}	—	December 11, 2001	Socorro	LINEAR	·	4.8 km	MPC · JPL
222660	2001 XL_{217}	—	December 14, 2001	Socorro	LINEAR	(5)	1.8 km	MPC · JPL
222661	2001 XD_{218}	—	December 15, 2001	Socorro	LINEAR	EUN	2.2 km	MPC · JPL
222662	2001 XR_{221}	—	December 15, 2001	Socorro	LINEAR	·	2.6 km	MPC · JPL
222663	2001 XU_{228}	—	December 15, 2001	Socorro	LINEAR	(5)	1.5 km	MPC · JPL
222664	2001 XV_{233}	—	December 15, 2001	Socorro	LINEAR	·	1.7 km	MPC · JPL
222665	2001 XP_{234}	—	December 15, 2001	Socorro	LINEAR	·	1.7 km	MPC · JPL
222666	2001 XK_{254}	—	December 15, 2001	Socorro	LINEAR	·	1.5 km	MPC · JPL
222667	2001 YN_{7}	—	December 17, 2001	Socorro	LINEAR	·	2.0 km	MPC · JPL
222668	2001 YT_{8}	—	December 17, 2001	Socorro	LINEAR	·	2.3 km	MPC · JPL
222669	2001 YV_{10}	—	December 17, 2001	Socorro	LINEAR	·	1.9 km	MPC · JPL
222670	2001 YJ_{19}	—	December 17, 2001	Socorro	LINEAR	MAR	1.7 km	MPC · JPL
222671	2001 YT_{20}	—	December 18, 2001	Socorro	LINEAR	·	1.3 km	MPC · JPL
222672	2001 YS_{21}	—	December 18, 2001	Socorro	LINEAR	·	1.3 km	MPC · JPL
222673	2001 YL_{27}	—	December 18, 2001	Socorro	LINEAR	(5)	1.7 km	MPC · JPL
222674	2001 YD_{33}	—	December 18, 2001	Socorro	LINEAR	·	2.5 km	MPC · JPL
222675	2001 YM_{34}	—	December 18, 2001	Socorro	LINEAR	·	2.2 km	MPC · JPL
222676	2001 YZ_{39}	—	December 18, 2001	Socorro	LINEAR	·	3.5 km	MPC · JPL
222677	2001 YR_{50}	—	December 18, 2001	Socorro	LINEAR	·	2.0 km	MPC · JPL
222678	2001 YR_{53}	—	December 18, 2001	Socorro	LINEAR	(5)	1.9 km	MPC · JPL
222679	2001 YY_{54}	—	December 18, 2001	Socorro	LINEAR	slow	2.6 km	MPC · JPL
222680	2001 YU_{67}	—	December 18, 2001	Socorro	LINEAR	·	2.6 km	MPC · JPL
222681	2001 YO_{84}	—	December 18, 2001	Socorro	LINEAR	·	2.7 km	MPC · JPL
222682	2001 YZ_{86}	—	December 18, 2001	Socorro	LINEAR	·	2.0 km	MPC · JPL
222683	2001 YG_{96}	—	December 18, 2001	Palomar	NEAT	·	2.1 km	MPC · JPL
222684	2001 YA_{112}	—	December 19, 2001	Socorro	LINEAR	(5)	2.1 km	MPC · JPL
222685	2001 YF_{115}	—	December 17, 2001	Socorro	LINEAR	·	1.8 km	MPC · JPL
222686	2001 YY_{116}	—	December 18, 2001	Socorro	LINEAR	·	1.6 km	MPC · JPL
222687	2001 YN_{122}	—	December 17, 2001	Socorro	LINEAR	(5)	2.1 km	MPC · JPL
222688	2001 YF_{126}	—	December 17, 2001	Socorro	LINEAR	·	2.1 km	MPC · JPL
222689	2001 YT_{161}	—	December 19, 2001	Socorro	LINEAR	H	990 m	MPC · JPL
222690	2002 AB_{6}	—	January 4, 2002	Palomar	NEAT	HNS	2.0 km	MPC · JPL
222691	2002 AU_{7}	—	January 4, 2002	Palomar	NEAT	slow	3.3 km	MPC · JPL
222692	2002 AF_{8}	—	January 5, 2002	Kitt Peak	Spacewatch	·	3.0 km	MPC · JPL
222693	2002 AO_{9}	—	January 11, 2002	Desert Eagle	W. K. Y. Yeung	·	2.3 km	MPC · JPL
222694	2002 AY_{9}	—	January 11, 2002	Desert Eagle	W. K. Y. Yeung	·	2.9 km	MPC · JPL
222695	2002 AT_{13}	—	January 11, 2002	Desert Eagle	W. K. Y. Yeung	·	1.4 km	MPC · JPL
222696	2002 AK_{15}	—	January 6, 2002	Socorro	LINEAR	·	1.8 km	MPC · JPL
222697	2002 AZ_{15}	—	January 4, 2002	Haleakala	NEAT	(5)	1.8 km	MPC · JPL
222698	2002 AY_{17}	—	January 12, 2002	Socorro	LINEAR	·	3.6 km	MPC · JPL
222699	2002 AP_{26}	—	January 11, 2002	Kitt Peak	Spacewatch	·	1.6 km	MPC · JPL
222700	2002 AR_{47}	—	January 9, 2002	Socorro	LINEAR	·	2.1 km	MPC · JPL

== 222701–222800 ==
back to top

Designation			Discovery			Properties		Ref
Permanent	Provisional	Named after	Date	Site	Discoverer(s)	Category	Diam.	Ref
222701	2002 AJ_{50}	—	January 9, 2002	Socorro	LINEAR	·	2.7 km	MPC · JPL
222702	2002 AS_{58}	—	January 9, 2002	Socorro	LINEAR	·	3.3 km	MPC · JPL
222703	2002 AG_{71}	—	January 8, 2002	Socorro	LINEAR	·	2.1 km	MPC · JPL
222704	2002 AY_{74}	—	January 8, 2002	Socorro	LINEAR	(5)	1.8 km	MPC · JPL
222705	2002 AL_{76}	—	January 8, 2002	Socorro	LINEAR	·	2.0 km	MPC · JPL
222706	2002 AC_{78}	—	January 8, 2002	Socorro	LINEAR	(5)	1.6 km	MPC · JPL
222707	2002 AE_{80}	—	January 8, 2002	Socorro	LINEAR	NEM	3.3 km	MPC · JPL
222708	2002 AD_{86}	—	January 9, 2002	Socorro	LINEAR	·	1.7 km	MPC · JPL
222709	2002 AF_{90}	—	January 11, 2002	Socorro	LINEAR	·	1.4 km	MPC · JPL
222710	2002 AN_{91}	—	January 15, 2002	Eskridge	Farpoint	·	2.6 km	MPC · JPL
222711	2002 AL_{99}	—	January 8, 2002	Socorro	LINEAR	·	2.4 km	MPC · JPL
222712	2002 AX_{99}	—	January 8, 2002	Socorro	LINEAR	·	3.0 km	MPC · JPL
222713	2002 AV_{105}	—	January 9, 2002	Socorro	LINEAR	·	3.7 km	MPC · JPL
222714	2002 AP_{109}	—	January 9, 2002	Socorro	LINEAR	·	2.0 km	MPC · JPL
222715	2002 AE_{110}	—	January 9, 2002	Socorro	LINEAR	·	1.7 km	MPC · JPL
222716	2002 AQ_{114}	—	January 9, 2002	Socorro	LINEAR	·	2.6 km	MPC · JPL
222717	2002 AM_{122}	—	January 9, 2002	Socorro	LINEAR	(5)	1.6 km	MPC · JPL
222718	2002 AC_{125}	—	January 11, 2002	Socorro	LINEAR	·	1.7 km	MPC · JPL
222719	2002 AY_{130}	—	January 12, 2002	Palomar	NEAT	·	1.4 km	MPC · JPL
222720	2002 AB_{137}	—	January 9, 2002	Socorro	LINEAR	·	2.4 km	MPC · JPL
222721	2002 AW_{147}	—	January 10, 2002	Palomar	NEAT	·	1.6 km	MPC · JPL
222722	2002 AO_{149}	—	January 14, 2002	Socorro	LINEAR	·	2.0 km	MPC · JPL
222723	2002 AU_{153}	—	January 14, 2002	Socorro	LINEAR	·	2.8 km	MPC · JPL
222724	2002 AF_{159}	—	January 13, 2002	Socorro	LINEAR	·	2.9 km	MPC · JPL
222725	2002 AR_{159}	—	January 13, 2002	Socorro	LINEAR	(5)	1.8 km	MPC · JPL
222726	2002 AS_{161}	—	January 13, 2002	Socorro	LINEAR	·	3.6 km	MPC · JPL
222727	2002 AG_{164}	—	January 13, 2002	Socorro	LINEAR	·	3.0 km	MPC · JPL
222728	2002 AE_{170}	—	January 14, 2002	Socorro	LINEAR	·	2.3 km	MPC · JPL
222729	2002 AX_{170}	—	January 14, 2002	Socorro	LINEAR	·	2.5 km	MPC · JPL
222730	2002 AR_{171}	—	January 14, 2002	Socorro	LINEAR	·	2.1 km	MPC · JPL
222731	2002 AM_{174}	—	January 14, 2002	Socorro	LINEAR	·	1.8 km	MPC · JPL
222732	2002 AX_{180}	—	January 5, 2002	Palomar	NEAT	ADE	3.8 km	MPC · JPL
222733	2002 AT_{183}	—	January 6, 2002	Palomar	NEAT	·	2.2 km	MPC · JPL
222734	2002 AG_{187}	—	January 8, 2002	Socorro	LINEAR	·	1.5 km	MPC · JPL
222735	2002 AV_{187}	—	January 9, 2002	Palomar	NEAT	·	2.0 km	MPC · JPL
222736	2002 AJ_{189}	—	January 10, 2002	Palomar	NEAT	·	3.3 km	MPC · JPL
222737	2002 AU_{190}	—	January 11, 2002	Kitt Peak	Spacewatch	·	1.7 km	MPC · JPL
222738	2002 AJ_{195}	—	January 13, 2002	Socorro	LINEAR	·	2.7 km	MPC · JPL
222739	2002 AD_{196}	—	January 13, 2002	Kitt Peak	Spacewatch	·	2.5 km	MPC · JPL
222740	2002 BK_{4}	—	January 19, 2002	Anderson Mesa	LONEOS	EUN	2.4 km	MPC · JPL
222741	2002 BK_{5}	—	January 19, 2002	Anderson Mesa	LONEOS	BAR	1.7 km	MPC · JPL
222742	2002 BL_{5}	—	January 19, 2002	Anderson Mesa	LONEOS	·	2.2 km	MPC · JPL
222743	2002 BT_{6}	—	January 18, 2002	Socorro	LINEAR	·	2.0 km	MPC · JPL
222744	2002 BQ_{11}	—	January 19, 2002	Socorro	LINEAR	·	2.8 km	MPC · JPL
222745	2002 BM_{14}	—	January 19, 2002	Socorro	LINEAR	EUN	1.8 km	MPC · JPL
222746	2002 BA_{23}	—	January 23, 2002	Socorro	LINEAR	·	2.6 km	MPC · JPL
222747	2002 BE_{29}	—	January 20, 2002	Anderson Mesa	LONEOS	·	1.9 km	MPC · JPL
222748	2002 BG_{30}	—	January 21, 2002	Anderson Mesa	LONEOS	·	3.3 km	MPC · JPL
222749	2002 CP_{2}	—	February 3, 2002	Palomar	NEAT	(5)	1.9 km	MPC · JPL
222750	2002 CD_{4}	—	February 6, 2002	Socorro	LINEAR	·	4.0 km	MPC · JPL
222751	2002 CW_{16}	—	February 6, 2002	Socorro	LINEAR	H	720 m	MPC · JPL
222752	2002 CA_{17}	—	February 6, 2002	Socorro	LINEAR	·	2.3 km	MPC · JPL
222753	2002 CY_{25}	—	February 10, 2002	Fountain Hills	C. W. Juels, P. R. Holvorcem	·	5.0 km	MPC · JPL
222754	2002 CA_{29}	—	February 6, 2002	Socorro	LINEAR	(5)	1.6 km	MPC · JPL
222755	2002 CH_{29}	—	February 6, 2002	Socorro	LINEAR	·	3.6 km	MPC · JPL
222756	2002 CQ_{32}	—	February 6, 2002	Socorro	LINEAR	·	2.0 km	MPC · JPL
222757	2002 CK_{39}	—	February 11, 2002	Desert Eagle	W. K. Y. Yeung	·	2.4 km	MPC · JPL
222758	2002 CP_{41}	—	February 7, 2002	Palomar	NEAT	·	3.2 km	MPC · JPL
222759	2002 CQ_{44}	—	February 6, 2002	Kitt Peak	Spacewatch	·	1.8 km	MPC · JPL
222760	2002 CJ_{47}	—	February 3, 2002	Haleakala	NEAT	·	2.3 km	MPC · JPL
222761	2002 CT_{52}	—	February 6, 2002	Socorro	LINEAR	(5)	1.4 km	MPC · JPL
222762	2002 CD_{54}	—	February 7, 2002	Socorro	LINEAR	·	3.1 km	MPC · JPL
222763	2002 CM_{65}	—	February 6, 2002	Socorro	LINEAR	·	3.0 km	MPC · JPL
222764	2002 CY_{65}	—	February 6, 2002	Socorro	LINEAR	·	3.6 km	MPC · JPL
222765	2002 CC_{77}	—	February 7, 2002	Socorro	LINEAR	·	1.9 km	MPC · JPL
222766	2002 CD_{78}	—	February 7, 2002	Socorro	LINEAR	·	3.1 km	MPC · JPL
222767	2002 CB_{81}	—	February 7, 2002	Socorro	LINEAR	·	3.0 km	MPC · JPL
222768	2002 CR_{81}	—	February 7, 2002	Socorro	LINEAR	·	2.5 km	MPC · JPL
222769	2002 CS_{86}	—	February 7, 2002	Socorro	LINEAR	·	2.2 km	MPC · JPL
222770	2002 CS_{90}	—	February 7, 2002	Socorro	LINEAR	·	2.3 km	MPC · JPL
222771	2002 CV_{92}	—	February 7, 2002	Socorro	LINEAR	·	2.4 km	MPC · JPL
222772	2002 CT_{96}	—	February 7, 2002	Socorro	LINEAR	·	3.2 km	MPC · JPL
222773	2002 CB_{97}	—	February 7, 2002	Socorro	LINEAR	L4	10 km	MPC · JPL
222774	2002 CJ_{103}	—	February 7, 2002	Socorro	LINEAR	·	5.6 km	MPC · JPL
222775	2002 CS_{104}	—	February 7, 2002	Socorro	LINEAR	·	1.9 km	MPC · JPL
222776	2002 CV_{121}	—	February 7, 2002	Socorro	LINEAR	·	2.5 km	MPC · JPL
222777	2002 CA_{130}	—	February 7, 2002	Socorro	LINEAR	·	3.8 km	MPC · JPL
222778	2002 CK_{137}	—	February 8, 2002	Socorro	LINEAR	GEF	1.6 km	MPC · JPL
222779	2002 CS_{137}	—	February 8, 2002	Socorro	LINEAR	AGN	1.8 km	MPC · JPL
222780	2002 CY_{141}	—	February 8, 2002	Socorro	LINEAR	·	2.0 km	MPC · JPL
222781	2002 CX_{142}	—	February 9, 2002	Socorro	LINEAR	MRX	1.3 km	MPC · JPL
222782	2002 CV_{160}	—	February 8, 2002	Socorro	LINEAR	·	2.5 km	MPC · JPL
222783	2002 CO_{171}	—	February 8, 2002	Socorro	LINEAR	·	2.6 km	MPC · JPL
222784	2002 CF_{179}	—	February 10, 2002	Socorro	LINEAR	·	2.6 km	MPC · JPL
222785	2002 CK_{183}	—	February 10, 2002	Socorro	LINEAR	L4	10 km	MPC · JPL
222786	2002 CK_{184}	—	February 10, 2002	Socorro	LINEAR	·	2.9 km	MPC · JPL
222787	2002 CQ_{197}	—	February 10, 2002	Socorro	LINEAR	MIS	3.2 km	MPC · JPL
222788	2002 CS_{197}	—	February 10, 2002	Socorro	LINEAR	·	2.0 km	MPC · JPL
222789	2002 CU_{200}	—	February 10, 2002	Socorro	LINEAR	·	2.5 km	MPC · JPL
222790	2002 CB_{205}	—	February 10, 2002	Socorro	LINEAR	L4	10 km	MPC · JPL
222791	2002 CG_{205}	—	February 10, 2002	Socorro	LINEAR	L4	10 km	MPC · JPL
222792	2002 CL_{205}	—	February 10, 2002	Socorro	LINEAR	NEM	2.5 km	MPC · JPL
222793	2002 CO_{205}	—	February 10, 2002	Socorro	LINEAR	(12739)	2.3 km	MPC · JPL
222794	2002 CV_{207}	—	February 10, 2002	Socorro	LINEAR	·	3.1 km	MPC · JPL
222795	2002 CC_{212}	—	February 10, 2002	Socorro	LINEAR	HOF	3.7 km	MPC · JPL
222796	2002 CQ_{213}	—	February 10, 2002	Socorro	LINEAR	·	2.3 km	MPC · JPL
222797	2002 CU_{221}	—	February 10, 2002	Socorro	LINEAR	·	2.5 km	MPC · JPL
222798	2002 CP_{222}	—	February 11, 2002	Socorro	LINEAR	·	2.1 km	MPC · JPL
222799	2002 CF_{227}	—	February 6, 2002	Palomar	NEAT	·	2.7 km	MPC · JPL
222800	2002 CY_{232}	—	February 10, 2002	Socorro	LINEAR	·	3.8 km	MPC · JPL

== 222801–222900 ==
back to top

Designation			Discovery			Properties		Ref
Permanent	Provisional	Named after	Date	Site	Discoverer(s)	Category	Diam.	Ref
222801	2002 CZ_{232}	—	February 11, 2002	Socorro	LINEAR	NEM	3.5 km	MPC · JPL
222802	2002 CC_{233}	—	February 11, 2002	Socorro	LINEAR	·	1.9 km	MPC · JPL
222803	2002 CF_{234}	—	February 12, 2002	Palomar	NEAT	·	3.0 km	MPC · JPL
222804	2002 CS_{235}	—	February 8, 2002	Socorro	LINEAR	·	4.8 km	MPC · JPL
222805	2002 CO_{247}	—	February 15, 2002	Socorro	LINEAR	·	3.9 km	MPC · JPL
222806	2002 CM_{252}	—	February 4, 2002	Anderson Mesa	LONEOS	·	2.2 km	MPC · JPL
222807	2002 CV_{253}	—	February 4, 2002	Palomar	NEAT	(21344)	2.0 km	MPC · JPL
222808	2002 CY_{254}	—	February 6, 2002	Anderson Mesa	LONEOS	·	2.7 km	MPC · JPL
222809	2002 CX_{255}	—	February 6, 2002	Palomar	NEAT	·	2.3 km	MPC · JPL
222810	2002 CB_{259}	—	February 6, 2002	Palomar	NEAT	·	2.7 km	MPC · JPL
222811	2002 CP_{261}	—	February 7, 2002	Haleakala	NEAT	·	3.1 km	MPC · JPL
222812 Priyadharmavaram	2002 CK_{266}	Priyadharmavaram	February 7, 2002	Kitt Peak	M. W. Buie	·	2.5 km	MPC · JPL
222813	2002 CH_{282}	—	February 8, 2002	Kitt Peak	Spacewatch	·	2.0 km	MPC · JPL
222814	2002 CU_{285}	—	February 10, 2002	Kitt Peak	Spacewatch	·	3.7 km	MPC · JPL
222815	2002 CA_{288}	—	February 9, 2002	Palomar	NEAT	·	3.3 km	MPC · JPL
222816	2002 CG_{294}	—	February 10, 2002	Socorro	LINEAR	·	2.5 km	MPC · JPL
222817	2002 CA_{296}	—	February 10, 2002	Socorro	LINEAR	·	2.5 km	MPC · JPL
222818	2002 CB_{297}	—	February 10, 2002	Socorro	LINEAR	·	2.9 km	MPC · JPL
222819	2002 CA_{298}	—	February 11, 2002	Socorro	LINEAR	·	2.3 km	MPC · JPL
222820	2002 CT_{304}	—	February 15, 2002	Socorro	LINEAR	JUN	1.1 km	MPC · JPL
222821	2002 CB_{316}	—	February 13, 2002	Kitt Peak	Spacewatch	L4	13 km	MPC · JPL
222822	2002 DN_{6}	—	February 20, 2002	Kitt Peak	Spacewatch	HOF	3.1 km	MPC · JPL
222823	2002 DP_{6}	—	February 20, 2002	Kitt Peak	Spacewatch	·	2.3 km	MPC · JPL
222824	2002 DP_{7}	—	February 19, 2002	Socorro	LINEAR	·	2.6 km	MPC · JPL
222825	2002 DL_{8}	—	February 19, 2002	Socorro	LINEAR	·	3.4 km	MPC · JPL
222826	2002 DS_{19}	—	February 22, 2002	Palomar	NEAT	L4	10 km	MPC · JPL
222827	2002 DP_{20}	—	February 22, 2002	Palomar	NEAT	L4	10 km	MPC · JPL
222828	2002 ER_{2}	—	March 9, 2002	Ondřejov	P. Kušnirák	·	2.8 km	MPC · JPL
222829	2002 EG_{7}	—	March 6, 2002	Siding Spring	R. H. McNaught	·	3.7 km	MPC · JPL
222830	2002 EL_{7}	—	March 6, 2002	Siding Spring	Siding Spring	·	2.4 km	MPC · JPL
222831	2002 EE_{8}	—	March 12, 2002	Palomar	NEAT	L4	20 km	MPC · JPL
222832	2002 EY_{12}	—	March 14, 2002	Desert Eagle	W. K. Y. Yeung	·	1.6 km	MPC · JPL
222833	2002 EL_{13}	—	March 2, 2002	Palomar	NEAT	·	5.4 km	MPC · JPL
222834	2002 EE_{15}	—	March 5, 2002	Kitt Peak	Spacewatch	NEM	2.2 km	MPC · JPL
222835	2002 ED_{18}	—	March 9, 2002	Kitt Peak	Spacewatch	·	2.4 km	MPC · JPL
222836	2002 ES_{19}	—	March 10, 2002	Haleakala	NEAT	·	5.4 km	MPC · JPL
222837	2002 EG_{30}	—	March 9, 2002	Socorro	LINEAR	·	2.2 km	MPC · JPL
222838	2002 EO_{52}	—	March 9, 2002	Socorro	LINEAR	·	2.5 km	MPC · JPL
222839	2002 EN_{54}	—	March 9, 2002	Kitt Peak	Spacewatch	AGN	1.5 km	MPC · JPL
222840	2002 EC_{57}	—	March 13, 2002	Socorro	LINEAR	L4	15 km	MPC · JPL
222841	2002 EF_{59}	—	March 13, 2002	Socorro	LINEAR	·	3.3 km	MPC · JPL
222842	2002 EE_{78}	—	March 11, 2002	Kitt Peak	Spacewatch	EOS	3.0 km	MPC · JPL
222843	2002 EB_{80}	—	March 12, 2002	Palomar	NEAT	L4	10 km	MPC · JPL
222844	2002 EH_{82}	—	March 13, 2002	Palomar	NEAT	L4	20 km	MPC · JPL
222845	2002 EL_{82}	—	March 13, 2002	Palomar	NEAT	KOR	2.1 km	MPC · JPL
222846	2002 EN_{82}	—	March 13, 2002	Palomar	NEAT	·	3.1 km	MPC · JPL
222847	2002 EL_{85}	—	March 9, 2002	Socorro	LINEAR	L4	11 km	MPC · JPL
222848	2002 EC_{95}	—	March 14, 2002	Socorro	LINEAR	·	3.6 km	MPC · JPL
222849	2002 EH_{99}	—	March 2, 2002	Palomar	NEAT	·	1.7 km	MPC · JPL
222850	2002 EC_{100}	—	March 5, 2002	Catalina	CSS	·	2.8 km	MPC · JPL
222851	2002 EA_{109}	—	March 9, 2002	Kitt Peak	Spacewatch	L4	10 km	MPC · JPL
222852	2002 EB_{114}	—	March 10, 2002	Kitt Peak	Spacewatch	·	2.2 km	MPC · JPL
222853	2002 EH_{117}	—	March 9, 2002	Kitt Peak	Spacewatch	·	1.5 km	MPC · JPL
222854	2002 EL_{119}	—	March 10, 2002	Kitt Peak	Spacewatch	L4	11 km	MPC · JPL
222855	2002 EY_{121}	—	March 12, 2002	Palomar	NEAT	KOR	1.8 km	MPC · JPL
222856	2002 EK_{125}	—	March 12, 2002	Palomar	NEAT	MRX	1.4 km	MPC · JPL
222857	2002 EP_{125}	—	March 10, 2002	Haleakala	NEAT	·	3.4 km	MPC · JPL
222858	2002 EU_{128}	—	March 12, 2002	Palomar	NEAT	·	2.3 km	MPC · JPL
222859	2002 EX_{128}	—	March 13, 2002	Socorro	LINEAR	L4	18 km	MPC · JPL
222860	2002 EX_{129}	—	March 12, 2002	Kitt Peak	Spacewatch	·	3.9 km	MPC · JPL
222861	2002 EZ_{134}	—	March 13, 2002	Palomar	NEAT	L4 · (222861)	13 km	MPC · JPL
222862	2002 EA_{136}	—	March 12, 2002	Palomar	NEAT	L4	10 km	MPC · JPL
222863	2002 EP_{136}	—	March 12, 2002	Palomar	NEAT	KOR	1.9 km	MPC · JPL
222864	2002 ET_{136}	—	March 12, 2002	Palomar	NEAT	L4	10 km	MPC · JPL
222865	2002 EJ_{150}	—	March 15, 2002	Palomar	NEAT	·	4.0 km	MPC · JPL
222866	2002 EX_{150}	—	March 15, 2002	Palomar	NEAT	·	3.0 km	MPC · JPL
222867	2002 ES_{154}	—	March 14, 2002	Socorro	LINEAR	·	2.8 km	MPC · JPL
222868	2002 EA_{162}	—	March 6, 2002	Palomar	NEAT	·	2.0 km	MPC · JPL
222869	2002 FB_{6}	—	March 21, 2002	Socorro	LINEAR	APO +1km	1.0 km	MPC · JPL
222870	2002 FM_{8}	—	March 16, 2002	Socorro	LINEAR	·	2.8 km	MPC · JPL
222871	2002 FA_{27}	—	March 20, 2002	Socorro	LINEAR	L4	10 km	MPC · JPL
222872	2002 GF	—	April 2, 2002	Socorro	LINEAR	·	4.0 km	MPC · JPL
222873	2002 GL	—	April 3, 2002	Emerald Lane	L. Ball	KOR	2.4 km	MPC · JPL
222874	2002 GR_{13}	—	April 14, 2002	Socorro	LINEAR	EOS	2.4 km	MPC · JPL
222875	2002 GX_{13}	—	April 14, 2002	Socorro	LINEAR	·	4.9 km	MPC · JPL
222876	2002 GO_{41}	—	April 4, 2002	Palomar	NEAT	·	3.6 km	MPC · JPL
222877	2002 GG_{45}	—	April 4, 2002	Palomar	NEAT	EOS	3.8 km	MPC · JPL
222878	2002 GH_{49}	—	April 4, 2002	Palomar	NEAT	·	4.8 km	MPC · JPL
222879	2002 GO_{64}	—	April 8, 2002	Palomar	NEAT	·	2.5 km	MPC · JPL
222880	2002 GQ_{64}	—	April 8, 2002	Palomar	NEAT	EOS	3.3 km	MPC · JPL
222881	2002 GQ_{69}	—	April 8, 2002	Palomar	NEAT	·	3.9 km	MPC · JPL
222882	2002 GV_{72}	—	April 9, 2002	Anderson Mesa	LONEOS	·	3.1 km	MPC · JPL
222883	2002 GP_{83}	—	April 10, 2002	Socorro	LINEAR	·	3.1 km	MPC · JPL
222884	2002 GK_{86}	—	April 10, 2002	Socorro	LINEAR	·	3.9 km	MPC · JPL
222885	2002 GC_{91}	—	April 8, 2002	Palomar	NEAT	·	4.2 km	MPC · JPL
222886	2002 GM_{91}	—	April 9, 2002	Kitt Peak	Spacewatch	EOS	2.6 km	MPC · JPL
222887	2002 GS_{91}	—	April 9, 2002	Anderson Mesa	LONEOS	DOR	3.4 km	MPC · JPL
222888	2002 GY_{92}	—	April 9, 2002	Socorro	LINEAR	·	5.6 km	MPC · JPL
222889	2002 GU_{95}	—	April 9, 2002	Socorro	LINEAR	EOS	2.8 km	MPC · JPL
222890	2002 GB_{111}	—	April 10, 2002	Socorro	LINEAR	·	5.2 km	MPC · JPL
222891	2002 GB_{112}	—	April 10, 2002	Socorro	LINEAR	·	3.2 km	MPC · JPL
222892	2002 GR_{116}	—	April 11, 2002	Socorro	LINEAR	·	3.3 km	MPC · JPL
222893	2002 GM_{130}	—	April 12, 2002	Socorro	LINEAR	·	2.2 km	MPC · JPL
222894	2002 GB_{138}	—	April 12, 2002	Socorro	LINEAR	·	3.1 km	MPC · JPL
222895	2002 GF_{138}	—	April 12, 2002	Kitt Peak	Spacewatch	·	5.5 km	MPC · JPL
222896	2002 GN_{140}	—	April 13, 2002	Kitt Peak	Spacewatch	KOR	1.9 km	MPC · JPL
222897	2002 GJ_{162}	—	April 14, 2002	Palomar	NEAT	·	3.7 km	MPC · JPL
222898	2002 GB_{165}	—	April 14, 2002	Palomar	NEAT	·	2.9 km	MPC · JPL
222899	2002 GU_{169}	—	April 9, 2002	Socorro	LINEAR	·	3.0 km	MPC · JPL
222900	2002 GZ_{179}	—	April 8, 2002	Palomar	NEAT	·	800 m	MPC · JPL

== 222901–223000 ==
back to top

Designation			Discovery			Properties		Ref
Permanent	Provisional	Named after	Date	Site	Discoverer(s)	Category	Diam.	Ref
222901	2002 GH_{180}	—	April 8, 2002	Palomar	NEAT	·	2.7 km	MPC · JPL
222902	2002 GQ_{181}	—	April 3, 2002	Kitt Peak	Spacewatch	THM	3.0 km	MPC · JPL
222903 Rajanidhingra	2002 GS_{181}	Rajanidhingra	April 6, 2002	Cerro Tololo	M. W. Buie	·	3.0 km	MPC · JPL
222904	2002 GR_{184}	—	April 8, 2002	Kitt Peak	Spacewatch	·	3.6 km	MPC · JPL
222905	2002 HD_{5}	—	April 16, 2002	Socorro	LINEAR	·	2.5 km	MPC · JPL
222906	2002 HQ_{6}	—	April 18, 2002	Palomar	NEAT	·	5.2 km	MPC · JPL
222907	2002 HV_{10}	—	April 18, 2002	Palomar	NEAT	TIR ·	6.3 km	MPC · JPL
222908	2002 HF_{18}	—	April 18, 2002	Palomar	NEAT	THM	3.1 km	MPC · JPL
222909	2002 JU_{1}	—	May 4, 2002	Desert Eagle	W. K. Y. Yeung	·	3.0 km	MPC · JPL
222910	2002 JP_{32}	—	May 9, 2002	Socorro	LINEAR	HYG	3.9 km	MPC · JPL
222911	2002 JZ_{45}	—	May 9, 2002	Socorro	LINEAR	·	5.0 km	MPC · JPL
222912	2002 JB_{54}	—	May 9, 2002	Socorro	LINEAR	·	3.7 km	MPC · JPL
222913	2002 JA_{67}	—	May 10, 2002	Socorro	LINEAR	·	1.2 km	MPC · JPL
222914	2002 JW_{76}	—	May 11, 2002	Socorro	LINEAR	slow	4.1 km	MPC · JPL
222915	2002 JD_{83}	—	May 11, 2002	Socorro	LINEAR	EOS	3.1 km	MPC · JPL
222916	2002 JL_{98}	—	May 11, 2002	Socorro	LINEAR	·	4.5 km	MPC · JPL
222917	2002 JS_{98}	—	May 13, 2002	Socorro	LINEAR	·	5.4 km	MPC · JPL
222918	2002 JM_{105}	—	May 12, 2002	Socorro	LINEAR	·	3.7 km	MPC · JPL
222919	2002 JT_{108}	—	May 6, 2002	Socorro	LINEAR	·	1.7 km	MPC · JPL
222920	2002 JQ_{141}	—	May 11, 2002	Socorro	LINEAR	EOS	2.8 km	MPC · JPL
222921	2002 JG_{145}	—	May 13, 2002	Palomar	NEAT	·	5.0 km	MPC · JPL
222922	2002 JF_{147}	—	May 9, 2002	Socorro	LINEAR	·	1.2 km	MPC · JPL
222923	2002 JZ_{148}	—	May 1, 2002	Palomar	NEAT	EOS	2.7 km	MPC · JPL
222924	2002 LO_{29}	—	June 7, 2002	Palomar	NEAT	EOS	4.2 km	MPC · JPL
222925	2002 LQ_{32}	—	June 11, 2002	Fountain Hills	C. W. Juels, P. R. Holvorcem	·	7.4 km	MPC · JPL
222926	2002 LZ_{44}	—	June 5, 2002	Anderson Mesa	LONEOS	·	4.6 km	MPC · JPL
222927	2002 LN_{53}	—	June 9, 2002	Palomar	NEAT	·	5.4 km	MPC · JPL
222928	2002 LA_{54}	—	June 10, 2002	Socorro	LINEAR	·	5.3 km	MPC · JPL
222929	2002 LD_{62}	—	June 6, 2002	Kitt Peak	Spacewatch	·	840 m	MPC · JPL
222930	2002 MT_{5}	—	June 23, 2002	Palomar	NEAT	·	870 m	MPC · JPL
222931	2002 NQ_{7}	—	July 9, 2002	Socorro	LINEAR	fast	770 m	MPC · JPL
222932	2002 NN_{11}	—	July 4, 2002	Palomar	NEAT	·	970 m	MPC · JPL
222933	2002 NO_{22}	—	July 9, 2002	Socorro	LINEAR	fast	1.0 km	MPC · JPL
222934	2002 NR_{61}	—	July 6, 2002	Palomar	NEAT	·	1.1 km	MPC · JPL
222935	2002 NT_{63}	—	July 8, 2002	Palomar	NEAT	·	920 m	MPC · JPL
222936	2002 OX	—	July 17, 2002	Socorro	LINEAR	·	900 m	MPC · JPL
222937	2002 OY_{5}	—	July 20, 2002	Palomar	NEAT	·	3.6 km	MPC · JPL
222938	2002 OL_{9}	—	July 21, 2002	Palomar	NEAT	·	1.3 km	MPC · JPL
222939	2002 OO_{9}	—	July 21, 2002	Palomar	NEAT	(2076)	930 m	MPC · JPL
222940	2002 OG_{19}	—	July 23, 2002	Palomar	NEAT	·	1.1 km	MPC · JPL
222941	2002 OU_{25}	—	July 16, 2002	Palomar	NEAT	·	1.1 km	MPC · JPL
222942	2002 OX_{27}	—	July 19, 2002	Palomar	NEAT	·	670 m	MPC · JPL
222943	2002 PN_{4}	—	August 4, 2002	Palomar	NEAT	·	980 m	MPC · JPL
222944	2002 PL_{11}	—	August 5, 2002	Campo Imperatore	CINEOS	·	1.2 km	MPC · JPL
222945	2002 PA_{27}	—	August 6, 2002	Palomar	NEAT	·	1.1 km	MPC · JPL
222946	2002 PO_{29}	—	August 6, 2002	Palomar	NEAT	·	1.0 km	MPC · JPL
222947	2002 PV_{30}	—	August 6, 2002	Palomar	NEAT	·	1.1 km	MPC · JPL
222948	2002 PS_{49}	—	August 10, 2002	Socorro	LINEAR	·	1.2 km	MPC · JPL
222949	2002 PU_{57}	—	August 9, 2002	Socorro	LINEAR	·	1.4 km	MPC · JPL
222950	2002 PQ_{73}	—	August 12, 2002	Socorro	LINEAR	·	820 m	MPC · JPL
222951	2002 PM_{98}	—	August 14, 2002	Socorro	LINEAR	·	6.9 km	MPC · JPL
222952	2002 PQ_{108}	—	August 13, 2002	Socorro	LINEAR	·	880 m	MPC · JPL
222953	2002 PS_{108}	—	August 13, 2002	Socorro	LINEAR	·	1.8 km	MPC · JPL
222954	2002 PF_{120}	—	August 13, 2002	Anderson Mesa	LONEOS	·	960 m	MPC · JPL
222955	2002 PM_{120}	—	August 13, 2002	Anderson Mesa	LONEOS	·	990 m	MPC · JPL
222956	2002 PF_{129}	—	August 14, 2002	Socorro	LINEAR	·	1.1 km	MPC · JPL
222957	2002 PR_{159}	—	August 8, 2002	Palomar	S. F. Hönig	·	1.1 km	MPC · JPL
222958	2002 PG_{185}	—	August 15, 2002	Anderson Mesa	LONEOS	·	930 m	MPC · JPL
222959	2002 PH_{186}	—	August 11, 2002	Palomar	NEAT	·	1.0 km	MPC · JPL
222960	2002 QW_{15}	—	August 27, 2002	Socorro	LINEAR	PHO	2.2 km	MPC · JPL
222961	2002 QC_{17}	—	August 27, 2002	Palomar	NEAT	·	850 m	MPC · JPL
222962	2002 QF_{21}	—	August 28, 2002	Palomar	NEAT	·	1.1 km	MPC · JPL
222963	2002 QP_{28}	—	August 29, 2002	Palomar	NEAT	·	810 m	MPC · JPL
222964	2002 QK_{41}	—	August 29, 2002	Palomar	NEAT	·	1.1 km	MPC · JPL
222965	2002 QJ_{45}	—	August 30, 2002	Kitt Peak	Spacewatch	·	1.1 km	MPC · JPL
222966	2002 QY_{54}	—	August 29, 2002	Palomar	S. F. Hönig	·	1.1 km	MPC · JPL
222967	2002 QG_{71}	—	August 30, 2002	Palomar	NEAT	·	1.0 km	MPC · JPL
222968	2002 QO_{73}	—	August 19, 2002	Palomar	NEAT	·	950 m	MPC · JPL
222969	2002 QL_{88}	—	August 29, 2002	Palomar	NEAT	·	850 m	MPC · JPL
222970	2002 QP_{97}	—	August 18, 2002	Palomar	NEAT	·	1.8 km	MPC · JPL
222971	2002 QO_{105}	—	August 29, 2002	Palomar	NEAT	·	770 m	MPC · JPL
222972	2002 QW_{106}	—	August 17, 2002	Palomar	NEAT	·	860 m	MPC · JPL
222973	2002 QM_{107}	—	August 16, 2002	Palomar	NEAT	·	1.1 km	MPC · JPL
222974	2002 QQ_{116}	—	August 18, 2002	Palomar	NEAT	fast	810 m	MPC · JPL
222975	2002 QK_{126}	—	August 17, 2002	Palomar	NEAT	SYL · CYB	5.4 km	MPC · JPL
222976	2002 QM_{133}	—	August 19, 2002	Palomar	NEAT	NYS	1.2 km	MPC · JPL
222977	2002 RK_{21}	—	September 4, 2002	Anderson Mesa	LONEOS	·	850 m	MPC · JPL
222978	2002 RB_{24}	—	September 4, 2002	Anderson Mesa	LONEOS	·	1.0 km	MPC · JPL
222979	2002 RJ_{26}	—	September 4, 2002	Palomar	NEAT	·	990 m	MPC · JPL
222980	2002 RF_{31}	—	September 4, 2002	Anderson Mesa	LONEOS	·	1.1 km	MPC · JPL
222981	2002 RM_{40}	—	September 5, 2002	Socorro	LINEAR	·	1.0 km	MPC · JPL
222982	2002 RG_{45}	—	September 5, 2002	Socorro	LINEAR	·	1.4 km	MPC · JPL
222983	2002 RS_{45}	—	September 5, 2002	Socorro	LINEAR	·	1.0 km	MPC · JPL
222984	2002 RQ_{51}	—	September 5, 2002	Socorro	LINEAR	·	930 m	MPC · JPL
222985	2002 RZ_{53}	—	September 5, 2002	Socorro	LINEAR	·	750 m	MPC · JPL
222986	2002 RQ_{55}	—	September 5, 2002	Anderson Mesa	LONEOS	(2076)	1.4 km	MPC · JPL
222987	2002 RQ_{59}	—	September 5, 2002	Socorro	LINEAR	·	890 m	MPC · JPL
222988	2002 RP_{68}	—	September 4, 2002	Anderson Mesa	LONEOS	·	2.1 km	MPC · JPL
222989	2002 RR_{77}	—	September 5, 2002	Socorro	LINEAR	·	930 m	MPC · JPL
222990	2002 RE_{82}	—	September 5, 2002	Socorro	LINEAR	·	1.4 km	MPC · JPL
222991	2002 RX_{88}	—	September 5, 2002	Socorro	LINEAR	·	1.0 km	MPC · JPL
222992	2002 RK_{120}	—	September 5, 2002	Haleakala	NEAT	·	1 km	MPC · JPL
222993	2002 RX_{129}	—	September 10, 2002	Palomar	NEAT	PHO	1.5 km	MPC · JPL
222994	2002 RQ_{151}	—	September 12, 2002	Palomar	NEAT	·	1.4 km	MPC · JPL
222995	2002 RT_{152}	—	September 12, 2002	Palomar	NEAT	·	1.1 km	MPC · JPL
222996	2002 RZ_{152}	—	September 12, 2002	Palomar	NEAT	V	1.0 km	MPC · JPL
222997	2002 RO_{157}	—	September 11, 2002	Palomar	NEAT	·	960 m	MPC · JPL
222998	2002 RG_{159}	—	September 11, 2002	Palomar	NEAT	·	1.1 km	MPC · JPL
222999	2002 RZ_{164}	—	September 12, 2002	Palomar	NEAT	·	870 m	MPC · JPL
223000	2002 RR_{173}	—	September 13, 2002	Kitt Peak	Spacewatch	·	1.0 km	MPC · JPL

back to top

== See also ==
- Meanings of minor-planet names: 222001–223000
