= List of minor planets: 790001–791000 =

The following is a partial list of minor planets, running from minor-planet number 790001 through 791000, inclusive. The primary data for this and other partial lists is based on JPL's "Small-Body Orbital Elements" and data available from the Minor Planet Center. Critical list information is also provided by the MPC, unless otherwise specified from Lowell Observatory. A detailed description of the table's columns and additional sources are given on the main page including a complete list of every page in this series, and a statistical break-up on the dynamical classification of minor planets.

Also see the summary list of all named bodies in numerical and alphabetical order, and the corresponding naming citations for the number range of this particular list. New namings may only be added to this list after official publication, as the preannouncement of names is condemned by the Working Group for Small Bodies Nomenclature of the International Astronomical Union.

Near-Earth obj.	MBA (inner)	MBA (outer)	Centaur
Mars-crosser	MBA (middle)	Jupiter trojan	Trans-Neptunian obj.
Unclassified

== 790001–790100 ==
Designation			Discovery			Properties		Ref
Permanent	Provisional	Named after	Date	Site	Discoverer(s)	Category	Diam.	Ref
790001	2018 BW_{35}	—	January 16, 2018	Haleakala	Pan-STARRS 1	EUN	960 m	MPC · JPL
790002	2018 BY_{38}	—	September 2, 2008	Siding Spring	SSS	·	1.1 km	MPC · JPL
790003	2018 BJ_{46}	—	April 21, 2014	Mount Lemmon	Mount Lemmon Survey	·	1.4 km	MPC · JPL
790004	2018 CE_{6}	—	February 20, 2014	Kitt Peak	Spacewatch	·	1.3 km	MPC · JPL
790005	2018 CR_{18}	—	February 12, 2018	Haleakala	Pan-STARRS 1	JUN	780 m	MPC · JPL
790006	2018 CL_{19}	—	November 25, 2016	Mount Lemmon	Mount Lemmon Survey	·	1.6 km	MPC · JPL
790007	2018 CB_{34}	—	March 20, 2014	Mount Lemmon	Mount Lemmon Survey	EUN	830 m	MPC · JPL
790008	2018 DO_{7}	—	April 4, 2014	Haleakala	Pan-STARRS 1	·	1.2 km	MPC · JPL
790009	2018 DO_{9}	—	February 22, 2018	Mount Lemmon	Mount Lemmon Survey	·	1.1 km	MPC · JPL
790010	2018 DH_{11}	—	February 17, 2018	Mount Lemmon	Mount Lemmon Survey	·	2.1 km	MPC · JPL
790011	2018 DL_{11}	—	February 26, 2018	Mount Lemmon	Mount Lemmon Survey	·	1.1 km	MPC · JPL
790012	2018 EJ_{4}	—	March 13, 2018	Mount Lemmon	Mount Lemmon Survey	AMO · PHA	190 m	MPC · JPL
790013	2018 EO_{9}	—	February 19, 2001	Haleakala	NEAT	BAR	940 m	MPC · JPL
790014	2018 EA_{14}	—	March 10, 2018	Haleakala	Pan-STARRS 1	·	1.3 km	MPC · JPL
790015	2018 EG_{18}	—	March 10, 2018	Haleakala	Pan-STARRS 1	KOR	1.1 km	MPC · JPL
790016	2018 FG_{6}	—	March 17, 2018	Haleakala	Pan-STARRS 1	·	1.1 km	MPC · JPL
790017	2018 FG_{13}	—	November 1, 2011	Kitt Peak	Spacewatch	·	1.2 km	MPC · JPL
790018	2018 FO_{15}	—	March 14, 2013	Mount Lemmon	Mount Lemmon Survey	·	1.4 km	MPC · JPL
790019	2018 FZ_{20}	—	May 2, 2014	Mount Lemmon	Mount Lemmon Survey	·	960 m	MPC · JPL
790020	2018 FE_{21}	—	September 12, 2015	Haleakala	Pan-STARRS 1	·	2.0 km	MPC · JPL
790021	2018 FY_{23}	—	May 7, 2014	Haleakala	Pan-STARRS 1	HOF	2.1 km	MPC · JPL
790022	2018 FJ_{30}	—	March 17, 2018	Haleakala	Pan-STARRS 1	·	1.2 km	MPC · JPL
790023	2018 FZ_{33}	—	March 17, 2018	Haleakala	Pan-STARRS 1	·	1.9 km	MPC · JPL
790024	2018 FT_{35}	—	March 18, 2018	Haleakala	Pan-STARRS 1	MIS	2.0 km	MPC · JPL
790025	2018 FO_{36}	—	March 17, 2018	Haleakala	Pan-STARRS 1	HOF	2.2 km	MPC · JPL
790026	2018 FK_{38}	—	March 18, 2018	Haleakala	Pan-STARRS 1	·	1.0 km	MPC · JPL
790027	2018 FO_{38}	—	March 19, 2018	Mount Lemmon	Mount Lemmon Survey	EOS	1.5 km	MPC · JPL
790028	2018 FZ_{38}	—	March 18, 2018	Haleakala	Pan-STARRS 1	·	1.2 km	MPC · JPL
790029	2018 FD_{40}	—	March 18, 2018	Haleakala	Pan-STARRS 1	·	1.3 km	MPC · JPL
790030	2018 FK_{42}	—	March 18, 2018	Haleakala	Pan-STARRS 1	·	2.1 km	MPC · JPL
790031	2018 FD_{43}	—	March 18, 2018	Haleakala	Pan-STARRS 1	AGN	910 m	MPC · JPL
790032	2018 FA_{44}	—	March 18, 2018	Haleakala	Pan-STARRS 1	EUN	740 m	MPC · JPL
790033	2018 FB_{44}	—	March 6, 2013	Haleakala	Pan-STARRS 1	·	1.5 km	MPC · JPL
790034	2018 FF_{45}	—	February 25, 2010	WISE	WISE	KON	1.6 km	MPC · JPL
790035	2018 FC_{49}	—	March 19, 2018	Mount Lemmon	Mount Lemmon Survey	·	1.4 km	MPC · JPL
790036	2018 FF_{49}	—	March 16, 2018	Mount Lemmon	Mount Lemmon Survey	·	2.1 km	MPC · JPL
790037	2018 FP_{50}	—	March 16, 2018	Mount Lemmon	Mount Lemmon Survey	·	1.1 km	MPC · JPL
790038	2018 FL_{63}	—	March 18, 2018	Haleakala	Pan-STARRS 1	·	1.3 km	MPC · JPL
790039	2018 GX_{4}	—	April 12, 2018	Mount Lemmon	Mount Lemmon Survey	APO	520 m	MPC · JPL
790040	2018 GA_{14}	—	March 28, 2009	Mount Lemmon	Mount Lemmon Survey	·	1.5 km	MPC · JPL
790041	2018 GS_{17}	—	January 20, 2013	Kitt Peak	Spacewatch	·	1.3 km	MPC · JPL
790042	2018 GF_{18}	—	April 15, 2018	Mount Lemmon	Mount Lemmon Survey	·	960 m	MPC · JPL
790043	2018 GE_{20}	—	April 12, 2018	Haleakala	Pan-STARRS 1	·	1.2 km	MPC · JPL
790044	2018 GR_{22}	—	April 13, 2018	Haleakala	Pan-STARRS 1	·	1.4 km	MPC · JPL
790045	2018 GZ_{22}	—	January 19, 2012	Haleakala	Pan-STARRS 1	·	1.8 km	MPC · JPL
790046	2018 GV_{24}	—	April 13, 2018	Haleakala	Pan-STARRS 1	KOR	1.1 km	MPC · JPL
790047	2018 GH_{25}	—	April 14, 2018	Mount Lemmon	Mount Lemmon Survey	·	1.9 km	MPC · JPL
790048	2018 GL_{25}	—	April 13, 2018	Haleakala	Pan-STARRS 1	MAR	830 m	MPC · JPL
790049	2018 GU_{25}	—	January 19, 2012	Haleakala	Pan-STARRS 1	·	1.7 km	MPC · JPL
790050	2018 GJ_{26}	—	May 8, 2014	Haleakala	Pan-STARRS 1	·	1.0 km	MPC · JPL
790051	2018 HP_{4}	—	February 3, 2013	Haleakala	Pan-STARRS 1	·	990 m	MPC · JPL
790052	2018 HN_{8}	—	April 16, 2018	Haleakala	Pan-STARRS 1	·	1.6 km	MPC · JPL
790053	2018 JP_{5}	—	November 17, 2009	Mount Lemmon	Mount Lemmon Survey	EUP	2.9 km	MPC · JPL
790054	2018 JA_{6}	—	April 27, 2009	Mount Lemmon	Mount Lemmon Survey	·	1.2 km	MPC · JPL
790055	2018 JS_{11}	—	January 29, 2009	Mount Lemmon	Mount Lemmon Survey	·	1.0 km	MPC · JPL
790056	2018 KP_{8}	—	May 19, 2018	Haleakala	Pan-STARRS 1	·	1.8 km	MPC · JPL
790057	2018 KO_{10}	—	May 23, 2018	Haleakala	Pan-STARRS 1	·	2.3 km	MPC · JPL
790058	2018 KG_{12}	—	May 18, 2018	Mount Lemmon	Mount Lemmon Survey	·	1.4 km	MPC · JPL
790059	2018 KC_{13}	—	May 20, 2018	Haleakala	Pan-STARRS 1	·	1.4 km	MPC · JPL
790060	2018 KM_{17}	—	May 19, 2018	Haleakala	Pan-STARRS 1	·	1.1 km	MPC · JPL
790061	2018 KV_{21}	—	May 19, 2018	Haleakala	Pan-STARRS 1	KOR	1.0 km	MPC · JPL
790062	2018 KS_{23}	—	May 19, 2018	Haleakala	Pan-STARRS 1	·	820 m	MPC · JPL
790063	2018 KW_{23}	—	May 18, 2018	Mount Lemmon	Mount Lemmon Survey	·	720 m	MPC · JPL
790064	2018 LM_{4}	—	June 11, 2018	Mount Lemmon	Mount Lemmon Survey	APO	640 m	MPC · JPL
790065	2018 LB_{11}	—	February 13, 2013	Haleakala	Pan-STARRS 1	·	930 m	MPC · JPL
790066	2018 LL_{11}	—	March 5, 2013	Haleakala	Pan-STARRS 1	·	950 m	MPC · JPL
790067	2018 LR_{12}	—	December 3, 2010	Kitt Peak	Spacewatch	615	950 m	MPC · JPL
790068	2018 LC_{14}	—	May 20, 2018	Haleakala	Pan-STARRS 1	·	1.5 km	MPC · JPL
790069	2018 LG_{14}	—	July 14, 2013	Haleakala	Pan-STARRS 1	EOS	1.4 km	MPC · JPL
790070	2018 LM_{19}	—	June 15, 2018	Haleakala	Pan-STARRS 1	·	2.0 km	MPC · JPL
790071	2018 LQ_{21}	—	June 15, 2018	Haleakala	Pan-STARRS 1	·	1.4 km	MPC · JPL
790072	2018 LZ_{21}	—	June 15, 2018	Haleakala	Pan-STARRS 1	L4	7.1 km	MPC · JPL
790073	2018 LC_{22}	—	June 3, 2018	Haleakala	Pan-STARRS 1	·	930 m	MPC · JPL
790074	2018 LF_{22}	—	June 15, 2018	Haleakala	Pan-STARRS 1	·	1.2 km	MPC · JPL
790075	2018 LG_{22}	—	June 15, 2018	Haleakala	Pan-STARRS 1	·	2.5 km	MPC · JPL
790076	2018 LB_{23}	—	June 6, 2018	Haleakala	Pan-STARRS 1	EOS	1.2 km	MPC · JPL
790077	2018 LC_{23}	—	June 15, 2018	Haleakala	Pan-STARRS 1	·	1.2 km	MPC · JPL
790078	2018 LK_{24}	—	June 10, 2018	Haleakala	Pan-STARRS 1	·	1.8 km	MPC · JPL
790079	2018 LL_{24}	—	June 15, 2018	Haleakala	Pan-STARRS 1	L4	7.4 km	MPC · JPL
790080	2018 LC_{25}	—	June 15, 2018	Haleakala	Pan-STARRS 1	L4	6.2 km	MPC · JPL
790081	2018 LK_{26}	—	June 15, 2018	Haleakala	Pan-STARRS 1	L4	5.9 km	MPC · JPL
790082	2018 LD_{30}	—	June 14, 2018	Haleakala	Pan-STARRS 1	·	1.3 km	MPC · JPL
790083	2018 LX_{30}	—	June 15, 2018	Haleakala	Pan-STARRS 1	·	2.0 km	MPC · JPL
790084	2018 LZ_{30}	—	June 15, 2018	Haleakala	Pan-STARRS 1	·	1.5 km	MPC · JPL
790085	2018 LF_{31}	—	June 12, 2018	Haleakala	Pan-STARRS 1	·	1.5 km	MPC · JPL
790086	2018 LQ_{31}	—	June 6, 2018	Haleakala	Pan-STARRS 1	KOR	990 m	MPC · JPL
790087	2018 LZ_{31}	—	June 15, 2018	Haleakala	Pan-STARRS 1	·	880 m	MPC · JPL
790088	2018 LO_{32}	—	June 14, 2018	Haleakala	Pan-STARRS 1	EUN	920 m	MPC · JPL
790089	2018 LW_{32}	—	June 13, 2018	Haleakala	Pan-STARRS 1	·	1.7 km	MPC · JPL
790090	2018 LA_{34}	—	June 3, 2018	Haleakala	Pan-STARRS 1	·	2.3 km	MPC · JPL
790091	2018 LK_{35}	—	June 15, 2018	Haleakala	Pan-STARRS 1	·	1.5 km	MPC · JPL
790092	2018 LC_{37}	—	December 4, 2016	Mount Lemmon	Mount Lemmon Survey	·	1.2 km	MPC · JPL
790093	2018 LD_{39}	—	June 15, 2018	Haleakala	Pan-STARRS 1	·	800 m	MPC · JPL
790094	2018 LU_{39}	—	June 6, 2018	Haleakala	Pan-STARRS 1	·	920 m	MPC · JPL
790095	2018 LY_{48}	—	June 6, 2018	Haleakala	Pan-STARRS 1	·	1.6 km	MPC · JPL
790096	2018 LB_{54}	—	June 6, 2018	Haleakala	Pan-STARRS 1	·	700 m	MPC · JPL
790097	2018 LA_{56}	—	June 8, 2018	Haleakala	Pan-STARRS 1	·	1.4 km	MPC · JPL
790098	2018 LQ_{60}	—	November 17, 2014	Haleakala	Pan-STARRS 1	·	1.3 km	MPC · JPL
790099	2018 LR_{60}	—	June 6, 2018	Haleakala	Pan-STARRS 1	·	1.2 km	MPC · JPL
790100	2018 MZ_{1}	—	December 9, 2015	Haleakala	Pan-STARRS 1	·	1.3 km	MPC · JPL

== 790101–790200 ==
back to top

Designation			Discovery			Properties		Ref
Permanent	Provisional	Named after	Date	Site	Discoverer(s)	Category	Diam.	Ref
790101	2018 MC_{4}	—	June 17, 2018	Haleakala	Pan-STARRS 1	·	1.5 km	MPC · JPL
790102	2018 MV_{9}	—	June 21, 2018	Haleakala	Pan-STARRS 1	·	1.8 km	MPC · JPL
790103	2018 MM_{13}	—	June 18, 2018	Haleakala	Pan-STARRS 1	·	2.2 km	MPC · JPL
790104	2018 MF_{14}	—	June 17, 2018	Haleakala	Pan-STARRS 1	·	2.4 km	MPC · JPL
790105	2018 MQ_{14}	—	June 18, 2018	Haleakala	Pan-STARRS 1	L4	5.7 km	MPC · JPL
790106	2018 MA_{15}	—	June 19, 2018	Haleakala	Pan-STARRS 2	·	1.7 km	MPC · JPL
790107	2018 MP_{15}	—	February 25, 2017	Haleakala	Pan-STARRS 1	·	1.2 km	MPC · JPL
790108	2018 MZ_{15}	—	June 17, 2018	Haleakala	Pan-STARRS 1	·	1.5 km	MPC · JPL
790109	2018 MN_{17}	—	June 17, 2018	Haleakala	Pan-STARRS 1	L4	6.1 km	MPC · JPL
790110	2018 MQ_{17}	—	June 16, 2018	Haleakala	Pan-STARRS 1	L4	5.7 km	MPC · JPL
790111	2018 MU_{17}	—	June 17, 2018	Haleakala	Pan-STARRS 1	·	1.5 km	MPC · JPL
790112	2018 MJ_{18}	—	June 18, 2018	Haleakala	Pan-STARRS 1	·	1.2 km	MPC · JPL
790113	2018 MP_{18}	—	June 21, 2018	Haleakala	Pan-STARRS 1	·	1.4 km	MPC · JPL
790114	2018 MM_{20}	—	June 18, 2018	Haleakala	Pan-STARRS 1	·	2.1 km	MPC · JPL
790115	2018 MO_{21}	—	June 21, 2018	Haleakala	Pan-STARRS 1	·	1.8 km	MPC · JPL
790116	2018 MP_{22}	—	June 18, 2018	Haleakala	Pan-STARRS 1	EUN	960 m	MPC · JPL
790117	2018 MC_{23}	—	June 23, 2018	Haleakala	Pan-STARRS 1	URS	2.1 km	MPC · JPL
790118	2018 MJ_{23}	—	June 21, 2018	Haleakala	Pan-STARRS 1	·	1.4 km	MPC · JPL
790119	2018 MO_{23}	—	June 18, 2018	Haleakala	Pan-STARRS 1	·	2.1 km	MPC · JPL
790120	2018 MR_{23}	—	June 18, 2018	Haleakala	Pan-STARRS 1	·	1.2 km	MPC · JPL
790121	2018 MG_{24}	—	June 19, 2018	Haleakala	Pan-STARRS 1	LIX	2.6 km	MPC · JPL
790122	2018 MZ_{24}	—	June 18, 2018	Haleakala	Pan-STARRS 1	·	950 m	MPC · JPL
790123	2018 MG_{27}	—	June 18, 2018	Haleakala	Pan-STARRS 1	·	1.3 km	MPC · JPL
790124	2018 MN_{27}	—	June 18, 2018	Haleakala	Pan-STARRS 1	L4	5.9 km	MPC · JPL
790125	2018 MS_{27}	—	June 16, 2018	Haleakala	Pan-STARRS 1	·	1.5 km	MPC · JPL
790126	2018 MF_{32}	—	June 17, 2018	Haleakala	Pan-STARRS 1	·	2.3 km	MPC · JPL
790127	2018 MJ_{37}	—	June 17, 2018	Haleakala	Pan-STARRS 1	·	2.0 km	MPC · JPL
790128	2018 MT_{44}	—	June 18, 2018	Haleakala	Pan-STARRS 1	·	1.4 km	MPC · JPL
790129	2018 NV_{5}	—	July 8, 2018	Haleakala	Pan-STARRS 1	·	2.2 km	MPC · JPL
790130	2018 NB_{8}	—	January 8, 2011	Mount Lemmon	Mount Lemmon Survey	·	1.4 km	MPC · JPL
790131	2018 NO_{8}	—	October 17, 2014	Mount Lemmon	Mount Lemmon Survey	·	1.0 km	MPC · JPL
790132	2018 NR_{8}	—	July 10, 2018	Haleakala	Pan-STARRS 1	·	2.0 km	MPC · JPL
790133	2018 NT_{8}	—	January 3, 2016	Haleakala	Pan-STARRS 1	HOF	1.7 km	MPC · JPL
790134	2018 NV_{9}	—	February 17, 2021	Haleakala	Pan-STARRS 2	·	1.1 km	MPC · JPL
790135	2018 NL_{10}	—	August 27, 2014	Haleakala	Pan-STARRS 1	·	1.3 km	MPC · JPL
790136	2018 NK_{19}	—	April 25, 2017	Haleakala	Pan-STARRS 1	HYG	2.0 km	MPC · JPL
790137	2018 NN_{19}	—	August 10, 2007	Kitt Peak	Spacewatch	·	2.0 km	MPC · JPL
790138	2018 NY_{20}	—	July 11, 2018	Haleakala	Pan-STARRS 1	·	1.6 km	MPC · JPL
790139	2018 NA_{22}	—	July 12, 2018	Haleakala	Pan-STARRS 2	·	1.9 km	MPC · JPL
790140	2018 NE_{22}	—	February 28, 2016	Mount Lemmon	Mount Lemmon Survey	·	2.3 km	MPC · JPL
790141	2018 NF_{22}	—	July 13, 2018	Haleakala	Pan-STARRS 1	·	2.2 km	MPC · JPL
790142	2018 NL_{22}	—	July 9, 2018	Haleakala	Pan-STARRS 1	L4	6.1 km	MPC · JPL
790143	2018 NY_{22}	—	July 10, 2018	Haleakala	Pan-STARRS 1	·	2.0 km	MPC · JPL
790144	2018 ND_{23}	—	July 8, 2018	Haleakala	Pan-STARRS 1	L4	6.2 km	MPC · JPL
790145	2018 NJ_{23}	—	July 13, 2018	Haleakala	Pan-STARRS 2	·	2.5 km	MPC · JPL
790146	2018 NP_{23}	—	July 11, 2018	Haleakala	Pan-STARRS 1	·	1.6 km	MPC · JPL
790147	2018 NU_{23}	—	July 11, 2018	Haleakala	Pan-STARRS 2	HNS	780 m	MPC · JPL
790148	2018 NQ_{24}	—	July 10, 2018	Haleakala	Pan-STARRS 1	·	2.1 km	MPC · JPL
790149	2018 NR_{24}	—	June 15, 2018	Haleakala	Pan-STARRS 1	EOS	1.4 km	MPC · JPL
790150	2018 NS_{26}	—	July 11, 2018	Haleakala	Pan-STARRS 1	EOS	1.4 km	MPC · JPL
790151	2018 NW_{26}	—	July 11, 2018	Haleakala	Pan-STARRS 2	·	2.6 km	MPC · JPL
790152	2018 NY_{26}	—	July 13, 2018	Haleakala	Pan-STARRS 1	EOS	1.5 km	MPC · JPL
790153	2018 NA_{27}	—	November 1, 2008	Mount Lemmon	Mount Lemmon Survey	·	2.1 km	MPC · JPL
790154	2018 NZ_{27}	—	April 18, 2015	Cerro Tololo	DECam	L4 · ERY	5.3 km	MPC · JPL
790155	2018 NX_{28}	—	July 12, 2018	Haleakala	Pan-STARRS 2	·	2.1 km	MPC · JPL
790156	2018 NE_{29}	—	July 9, 2018	Haleakala	Pan-STARRS 1	·	730 m	MPC · JPL
790157	2018 NK_{29}	—	July 13, 2018	Haleakala	Pan-STARRS 1	·	1.1 km	MPC · JPL
790158	2018 NT_{29}	—	July 9, 2018	Haleakala	Pan-STARRS 1	·	1.5 km	MPC · JPL
790159	2018 NX_{29}	—	July 9, 2018	Haleakala	Pan-STARRS 1	·	1.3 km	MPC · JPL
790160	2018 NG_{30}	—	July 12, 2018	Haleakala	Pan-STARRS 1	·	970 m	MPC · JPL
790161	2018 NS_{32}	—	December 14, 2015	Haleakala	Pan-STARRS 1	·	1.2 km	MPC · JPL
790162	2018 NN_{33}	—	July 13, 2018	Haleakala	Pan-STARRS 1	L4	6.0 km	MPC · JPL
790163	2018 NR_{33}	—	July 11, 2018	Haleakala	Pan-STARRS 1	·	1.2 km	MPC · JPL
790164	2018 NE_{35}	—	July 9, 2018	Haleakala	Pan-STARRS 1	·	930 m	MPC · JPL
790165	2018 NH_{35}	—	July 9, 2018	Haleakala	Pan-STARRS 1	·	1.3 km	MPC · JPL
790166	2018 NM_{35}	—	July 12, 2018	Haleakala	Pan-STARRS 1	·	1.6 km	MPC · JPL
790167	2018 NN_{35}	—	July 10, 2018	Haleakala	Pan-STARRS 1	·	1.1 km	MPC · JPL
790168	2018 NR_{35}	—	July 9, 2018	Haleakala	Pan-STARRS 1	·	2.5 km	MPC · JPL
790169	2018 NZ_{35}	—	July 11, 2018	Haleakala	Pan-STARRS 1	·	1.1 km	MPC · JPL
790170	2018 NE_{37}	—	July 12, 2018	Haleakala	Pan-STARRS 1	·	1.2 km	MPC · JPL
790171	2018 NS_{38}	—	September 25, 2009	Kitt Peak	Spacewatch	AGN	810 m	MPC · JPL
790172	2018 NA_{39}	—	July 12, 2018	Haleakala	Pan-STARRS 2	L4 · ERY	5.9 km	MPC · JPL
790173	2018 ND_{39}	—	July 11, 2018	Haleakala	Pan-STARRS 1	·	1.6 km	MPC · JPL
790174	2018 NH_{39}	—	March 28, 2016	Cerro Tololo	DECam	·	2.4 km	MPC · JPL
790175	2018 NJ_{39}	—	July 8, 2018	Haleakala	Pan-STARRS 1	·	1.4 km	MPC · JPL
790176	2018 NE_{40}	—	July 12, 2018	Haleakala	Pan-STARRS 1	TIR	1.7 km	MPC · JPL
790177	2018 ND_{42}	—	August 30, 2014	Mount Lemmon	Mount Lemmon Survey	·	1.1 km	MPC · JPL
790178	2018 NA_{43}	—	July 12, 2018	Haleakala	Pan-STARRS 1	·	2.4 km	MPC · JPL
790179	2018 NQ_{43}	—	March 26, 2017	Haleakala	Pan-STARRS 1	AGN	870 m	MPC · JPL
790180	2018 NC_{45}	—	August 27, 2014	Haleakala	Pan-STARRS 1	·	1.4 km	MPC · JPL
790181	2018 NL_{45}	—	July 9, 2018	Haleakala	Pan-STARRS 1	·	1.2 km	MPC · JPL
790182	2018 NS_{45}	—	July 9, 2018	Haleakala	Pan-STARRS 1	BRA	1.1 km	MPC · JPL
790183	2018 NJ_{49}	—	July 11, 2018	Haleakala	Pan-STARRS 2	EUN	930 m	MPC · JPL
790184	2018 NW_{51}	—	December 28, 2014	Mount Lemmon	Mount Lemmon Survey	·	1.3 km	MPC · JPL
790185	2018 NP_{54}	—	June 7, 2013	Haleakala	Pan-STARRS 1	AGN	910 m	MPC · JPL
790186	2018 NP_{55}	—	July 10, 2018	Haleakala	Pan-STARRS 1	·	2.0 km	MPC · JPL
790187	2018 NW_{56}	—	July 12, 2018	Haleakala	Pan-STARRS 1	·	1.4 km	MPC · JPL
790188	2018 NM_{65}	—	July 12, 2018	Haleakala	Pan-STARRS 1	·	1.5 km	MPC · JPL
790189	2018 NK_{66}	—	July 11, 2018	Haleakala	Pan-STARRS 1	GEF	970 m	MPC · JPL
790190	2018 NF_{67}	—	July 9, 2018	Haleakala	Pan-STARRS 1	·	1.1 km	MPC · JPL
790191	2018 NR_{69}	—	July 8, 2018	Haleakala	Pan-STARRS 1	·	1.2 km	MPC · JPL
790192	2018 NO_{78}	—	July 12, 2018	Haleakala	Pan-STARRS 2	·	1.5 km	MPC · JPL
790193	2018 NZ_{79}	—	July 11, 2018	Haleakala	Pan-STARRS 1	·	1.8 km	MPC · JPL
790194	2018 NZ_{80}	—	July 12, 2018	Haleakala	Pan-STARRS 1	·	1.5 km	MPC · JPL
790195	2018 OE	—	October 5, 2011	Westfield	International Astronomical Search Collaboration	·	1.5 km	MPC · JPL
790196	2018 OW	—	December 2, 2010	Mount Lemmon	Mount Lemmon Survey	·	1.2 km	MPC · JPL
790197	2018 OZ_{2}	—	July 16, 2018	Haleakala	Pan-STARRS 2	·	2.6 km	MPC · JPL
790198	2018 PF_{2}	—	September 14, 2014	Catalina	CSS	·	1.2 km	MPC · JPL
790199	2018 PM_{3}	—	September 30, 2005	Mount Lemmon	Mount Lemmon Survey	AGN	840 m	MPC · JPL
790200	2018 PU_{6}	—	October 11, 2009	Mount Lemmon	Mount Lemmon Survey	KOR	980 m	MPC · JPL

== 790201–790300 ==
back to top

Designation			Discovery			Properties		Ref
Permanent	Provisional	Named after	Date	Site	Discoverer(s)	Category	Diam.	Ref
790201	2018 PP_{12}	—	July 29, 2014	Haleakala	Pan-STARRS 1	·	1.3 km	MPC · JPL
790202	2018 PG_{13}	—	July 11, 2018	Haleakala	Pan-STARRS 1	PAD	1.1 km	MPC · JPL
790203	2018 PH_{13}	—	October 7, 2001	La Silla	Barbieri, C.	·	2.4 km	MPC · JPL
790204	2018 PZ_{14}	—	December 6, 2010	Mount Lemmon	Mount Lemmon Survey	·	1.2 km	MPC · JPL
790205	2018 PT_{15}	—	August 6, 2018	Haleakala	Pan-STARRS 1	·	1.3 km	MPC · JPL
790206	2018 PE_{18}	—	October 29, 2008	Mount Lemmon	Mount Lemmon Survey	·	2.4 km	MPC · JPL
790207	2018 PJ_{19}	—	January 17, 2016	Haleakala	Pan-STARRS 1	·	1.5 km	MPC · JPL
790208	2018 PZ_{25}	—	October 10, 2008	Mount Lemmon	Mount Lemmon Survey	·	1.2 km	MPC · JPL
790209	2018 PP_{30}	—	March 12, 2016	Mount Lemmon	Mount Lemmon Survey	·	1.1 km	MPC · JPL
790210	2018 PD_{31}	—	January 27, 2007	Mount Lemmon	Mount Lemmon Survey	·	1.3 km	MPC · JPL
790211	2018 PU_{32}	—	August 12, 2018	Haleakala	Pan-STARRS 1	·	2.4 km	MPC · JPL
790212	2018 PA_{34}	—	August 12, 2018	Haleakala	Pan-STARRS 1	·	2.4 km	MPC · JPL
790213	2018 PS_{37}	—	August 12, 2018	Haleakala	Pan-STARRS 1	·	2.6 km	MPC · JPL
790214	2018 PL_{40}	—	August 8, 2018	Haleakala	Pan-STARRS 1	·	1.3 km	MPC · JPL
790215	2018 PJ_{41}	—	August 12, 2018	Haleakala	Pan-STARRS 1	EUP	2.4 km	MPC · JPL
790216	2018 PO_{41}	—	August 11, 2018	Haleakala	Pan-STARRS 1	·	1.4 km	MPC · JPL
790217	2018 PD_{43}	—	August 13, 2018	Haleakala	Pan-STARRS 1	·	1.4 km	MPC · JPL
790218	2018 PP_{43}	—	August 5, 2018	Haleakala	Pan-STARRS 1	·	2.2 km	MPC · JPL
790219	2018 PQ_{43}	—	August 8, 2018	Haleakala	Pan-STARRS 1	·	1.5 km	MPC · JPL
790220	2018 PB_{44}	—	August 8, 2018	Haleakala	Pan-STARRS 1	·	1.0 km	MPC · JPL
790221	2018 PK_{44}	—	August 8, 2018	Haleakala	Pan-STARRS 1	·	2.7 km	MPC · JPL
790222	2018 PM_{44}	—	August 6, 2018	Haleakala	Pan-STARRS 1	·	2.0 km	MPC · JPL
790223	2018 PO_{44}	—	August 11, 2018	Haleakala	Pan-STARRS 1	EOS	1.3 km	MPC · JPL
790224	2018 PF_{45}	—	August 14, 2018	Haleakala	Pan-STARRS 1	·	1.9 km	MPC · JPL
790225	2018 PL_{45}	—	August 5, 2018	Haleakala	Pan-STARRS 1	KOR	880 m	MPC · JPL
790226	2018 PT_{47}	—	August 11, 2018	Haleakala	Pan-STARRS 1	GEF	890 m	MPC · JPL
790227	2018 PW_{47}	—	August 5, 2018	Haleakala	Pan-STARRS 1	·	1.1 km	MPC · JPL
790228	2018 PY_{47}	—	August 8, 2018	Haleakala	Pan-STARRS 1	·	2.2 km	MPC · JPL
790229	2018 PQ_{50}	—	August 7, 2018	Haleakala	Pan-STARRS 1	·	1.0 km	MPC · JPL
790230	2018 PH_{51}	—	July 12, 2018	Haleakala	Pan-STARRS 1	THB	1.7 km	MPC · JPL
790231	2018 PL_{51}	—	August 5, 2018	Haleakala	Pan-STARRS 1	·	1.0 km	MPC · JPL
790232	2018 PM_{51}	—	August 13, 2018	Haleakala	Pan-STARRS 1	·	940 m	MPC · JPL
790233	2018 PG_{54}	—	August 5, 2018	Haleakala	Pan-STARRS 1	L4	5.9 km	MPC · JPL
790234	2018 PW_{54}	—	August 6, 2018	Haleakala	Pan-STARRS 1	ADE	1.4 km	MPC · JPL
790235	2018 PH_{55}	—	August 7, 2018	Haleakala	Pan-STARRS 1	EOS	1.4 km	MPC · JPL
790236	2018 PL_{55}	—	August 5, 2018	Haleakala	Pan-STARRS 1	·	1.4 km	MPC · JPL
790237	2018 PO_{55}	—	August 7, 2018	Haleakala	Pan-STARRS 1	EUN	790 m	MPC · JPL
790238	2018 PQ_{55}	—	August 13, 2018	Haleakala	Pan-STARRS 1	·	1.1 km	MPC · JPL
790239	2018 PY_{56}	—	August 8, 2018	Haleakala	Pan-STARRS 1	AGN	900 m	MPC · JPL
790240	2018 PC_{57}	—	August 7, 2018	Haleakala	Pan-STARRS 1	·	1.1 km	MPC · JPL
790241	2018 PN_{57}	—	August 11, 2018	Haleakala	Pan-STARRS 1	LIX	2.8 km	MPC · JPL
790242	2018 PT_{57}	—	August 8, 2018	Haleakala	Pan-STARRS 1	KOR	890 m	MPC · JPL
790243	2018 PU_{57}	—	April 5, 2017	Mount Lemmon	Mount Lemmon Survey	·	740 m	MPC · JPL
790244	2018 PR_{58}	—	August 8, 2018	Haleakala	Pan-STARRS 1	·	1.5 km	MPC · JPL
790245	2018 PS_{58}	—	December 6, 2010	Mount Lemmon	Mount Lemmon Survey	·	1.2 km	MPC · JPL
790246	2018 PT_{58}	—	June 21, 2018	Haleakala	Pan-STARRS 1	·	1.5 km	MPC · JPL
790247	2018 PX_{58}	—	January 13, 2015	Haleakala	Pan-STARRS 1	·	2.4 km	MPC · JPL
790248	2018 PK_{59}	—	January 20, 2015	Haleakala	Pan-STARRS 1	·	2.0 km	MPC · JPL
790249	2018 PN_{59}	—	August 11, 2018	Haleakala	Pan-STARRS 1	·	950 m	MPC · JPL
790250	2018 PU_{60}	—	August 6, 2018	Haleakala	Pan-STARRS 1	·	1.5 km	MPC · JPL
790251	2018 PJ_{62}	—	August 6, 2018	Haleakala	Pan-STARRS 1	EOS	1.6 km	MPC · JPL
790252	2018 PO_{62}	—	August 13, 2018	Haleakala	Pan-STARRS 1	·	2.2 km	MPC · JPL
790253	2018 PT_{62}	—	October 5, 2013	Haleakala	Pan-STARRS 1	·	2.0 km	MPC · JPL
790254	2018 PY_{62}	—	July 31, 2000	Cerro Tololo	Deep Ecliptic Survey	·	1.3 km	MPC · JPL
790255	2018 PS_{63}	—	August 8, 2018	Haleakala	Pan-STARRS 1	·	1.3 km	MPC · JPL
790256	2018 PT_{63}	—	August 8, 2018	Haleakala	Pan-STARRS 1	·	1.3 km	MPC · JPL
790257	2018 PD_{64}	—	August 14, 2018	Haleakala	Pan-STARRS 1	EOS	1.3 km	MPC · JPL
790258	2018 PG_{64}	—	August 14, 2018	Haleakala	Pan-STARRS 1	HNS	720 m	MPC · JPL
790259	2018 PH_{64}	—	October 25, 2013	Mount Lemmon	Mount Lemmon Survey	·	2.1 km	MPC · JPL
790260	2018 PZ_{65}	—	March 28, 2016	Cerro Tololo	DECam	VER	1.7 km	MPC · JPL
790261	2018 PH_{66}	—	January 27, 2012	Mount Lemmon	Mount Lemmon Survey	L4	6.1 km	MPC · JPL
790262	2018 PA_{67}	—	December 21, 2014	Haleakala	Pan-STARRS 1	·	2.4 km	MPC · JPL
790263	2018 PU_{67}	—	August 14, 2018	Haleakala	Pan-STARRS 1	·	1.4 km	MPC · JPL
790264	2018 PC_{68}	—	August 5, 2018	Haleakala	Pan-STARRS 1	·	1.9 km	MPC · JPL
790265	2018 PL_{68}	—	August 5, 2018	Haleakala	Pan-STARRS 1	·	1.5 km	MPC · JPL
790266	2018 PY_{68}	—	August 5, 2018	Haleakala	Pan-STARRS 1	L4	6.5 km	MPC · JPL
790267	2018 PH_{69}	—	August 15, 2018	Haleakala	Pan-STARRS 1	EOS	1.2 km	MPC · JPL
790268	2018 PS_{69}	—	March 31, 2012	Mount Lemmon	Mount Lemmon Survey	KOR	1.0 km	MPC · JPL
790269	2018 PU_{69}	—	August 14, 2018	Haleakala	Pan-STARRS 1	·	1.4 km	MPC · JPL
790270	2018 PC_{70}	—	August 11, 2018	Haleakala	Pan-STARRS 1	·	2.2 km	MPC · JPL
790271	2018 PO_{70}	—	March 29, 2016	Cerro Tololo-DECam	DECam	·	1.3 km	MPC · JPL
790272	2018 PO_{72}	—	September 14, 2013	Haleakala	Pan-STARRS 1	·	1.5 km	MPC · JPL
790273	2018 PD_{74}	—	August 12, 2018	Haleakala	Pan-STARRS 1	·	2.4 km	MPC · JPL
790274	2018 PE_{74}	—	March 28, 2016	Cerro Tololo	DECam	·	1.9 km	MPC · JPL
790275	2018 PJ_{74}	—	January 17, 2015	Haleakala	Pan-STARRS 1	·	2.2 km	MPC · JPL
790276	2018 PW_{74}	—	June 30, 2013	Haleakala	Pan-STARRS 1	·	1.6 km	MPC · JPL
790277	2018 PY_{74}	—	August 5, 2018	Haleakala	Pan-STARRS 1	·	1.5 km	MPC · JPL
790278	2018 PJ_{75}	—	August 8, 2018	Haleakala	Pan-STARRS 1	·	1.3 km	MPC · JPL
790279	2018 PP_{75}	—	October 28, 2014	Haleakala	Pan-STARRS 1	HOF	1.8 km	MPC · JPL
790280	2018 PH_{77}	—	August 6, 2018	Haleakala	Pan-STARRS 1	·	1.8 km	MPC · JPL
790281	2018 PQ_{77}	—	November 17, 2014	Haleakala	Pan-STARRS 1	KOR	940 m	MPC · JPL
790282	2018 PJ_{78}	—	August 8, 2018	Haleakala	Pan-STARRS 1	·	2.1 km	MPC · JPL
790283	2018 PG_{82}	—	August 27, 2014	Haleakala	Pan-STARRS 1	·	1.1 km	MPC · JPL
790284	2018 PR_{82}	—	August 8, 2018	Haleakala	Pan-STARRS 1	·	1.3 km	MPC · JPL
790285	2018 PL_{84}	—	March 28, 2012	Mount Lemmon	Mount Lemmon Survey	·	1.5 km	MPC · JPL
790286	2018 PK_{86}	—	September 19, 2014	Haleakala	Pan-STARRS 1	·	1.2 km	MPC · JPL
790287	2018 PQ_{86}	—	April 20, 2017	Haleakala	Pan-STARRS 1	·	1.1 km	MPC · JPL
790288	2018 PH_{89}	—	May 3, 2008	Mount Lemmon	Mount Lemmon Survey	·	1.2 km	MPC · JPL
790289	2018 PZ_{89}	—	February 25, 2012	Mount Lemmon	Mount Lemmon Survey	PAD	1.1 km	MPC · JPL
790290	2018 PO_{90}	—	August 8, 2018	Haleakala	Pan-STARRS 1	·	1.2 km	MPC · JPL
790291	2018 PE_{93}	—	August 11, 2018	Haleakala	Pan-STARRS 1	·	1.3 km	MPC · JPL
790292	2018 PB_{97}	—	August 14, 2018	Haleakala	Pan-STARRS 1	EOS	1.3 km	MPC · JPL
790293	2018 PY_{99}	—	August 5, 2018	Haleakala	Pan-STARRS 1	·	1.2 km	MPC · JPL
790294	2018 PB_{104}	—	August 10, 2007	Kitt Peak	Spacewatch	LIX	2.5 km	MPC · JPL
790295	2018 PU_{105}	—	January 19, 2015	Mount Lemmon	Mount Lemmon Survey	·	2.4 km	MPC · JPL
790296	2018 PC_{106}	—	August 11, 2018	Haleakala	Pan-STARRS 1	·	1.1 km	MPC · JPL
790297	2018 PF_{106}	—	August 11, 2018	Haleakala	Pan-STARRS 1	·	1.7 km	MPC · JPL
790298	2018 PN_{108}	—	August 5, 2018	Haleakala	Pan-STARRS 1	·	1.2 km	MPC · JPL
790299	2018 PK_{110}	—	January 16, 2016	Haleakala	Pan-STARRS 1	·	1.1 km	MPC · JPL
790300	2018 PO_{116}	—	August 11, 2018	Haleakala	Pan-STARRS 1	·	2.0 km	MPC · JPL

== 790301–790400 ==
back to top

Designation			Discovery			Properties		Ref
Permanent	Provisional	Named after	Date	Site	Discoverer(s)	Category	Diam.	Ref
790301	2018 PG_{117}	—	August 14, 2018	Haleakala	Pan-STARRS 1	·	2.2 km	MPC · JPL
790302	2018 PN_{118}	—	August 11, 2018	Haleakala	Pan-STARRS 1	EOS	1.2 km	MPC · JPL
790303	2018 PE_{119}	—	January 23, 2015	Haleakala	Pan-STARRS 1	·	1.4 km	MPC · JPL
790304	2018 PF_{120}	—	August 8, 2018	Haleakala	Pan-STARRS 1	·	1.4 km	MPC · JPL
790305	2018 PF_{122}	—	August 8, 2018	Haleakala	Pan-STARRS 1	·	1.3 km	MPC · JPL
790306	2018 PG_{122}	—	October 28, 2014	Mount Lemmon	Mount Lemmon Survey	AGN	830 m	MPC · JPL
790307	2018 PL_{122}	—	August 5, 2018	Haleakala	Pan-STARRS 1	·	1.4 km	MPC · JPL
790308	2018 PN_{123}	—	October 25, 2013	Mount Lemmon	Mount Lemmon Survey	EOS	1.1 km	MPC · JPL
790309	2018 PL_{128}	—	August 11, 2018	Haleakala	Pan-STARRS 1	·	1.1 km	MPC · JPL
790310	2018 PY_{128}	—	August 11, 2018	Haleakala	Pan-STARRS 1	WIT	690 m	MPC · JPL
790311	2018 PM_{130}	—	August 13, 2018	Haleakala	Pan-STARRS 1	·	1.3 km	MPC · JPL
790312	2018 PT_{131}	—	December 21, 2008	Kitt Peak	Spacewatch	·	1.5 km	MPC · JPL
790313	2018 PZ_{131}	—	August 11, 2018	Haleakala	Pan-STARRS 1	·	1.1 km	MPC · JPL
790314	2018 PJ_{133}	—	August 20, 2014	Haleakala	Pan-STARRS 1	·	730 m	MPC · JPL
790315	2018 PA_{138}	—	January 18, 2015	Haleakala	Pan-STARRS 1	·	2.2 km	MPC · JPL
790316	2018 PJ_{145}	—	May 30, 2016	Haleakala	Pan-STARRS 1	L4	6.0 km	MPC · JPL
790317	2018 PK_{151}	—	January 20, 2015	Haleakala	Pan-STARRS 1	·	2.1 km	MPC · JPL
790318	2018 PL_{151}	—	August 11, 2018	Haleakala	Pan-STARRS 1	·	2.3 km	MPC · JPL
790319	2018 PR_{154}	—	August 14, 2018	Haleakala	Pan-STARRS 1	·	2.2 km	MPC · JPL
790320	2018 PU_{155}	—	March 31, 2016	Cerro Tololo	DECam	·	2.0 km	MPC · JPL
790321	2018 PP_{158}	—	January 24, 2015	Kitt Peak	Spacewatch	·	1.3 km	MPC · JPL
790322	2018 PU_{158}	—	August 5, 2018	Haleakala	Pan-STARRS 1	·	1.5 km	MPC · JPL
790323	2018 PO_{160}	—	August 8, 2018	Haleakala	Pan-STARRS 1	·	1.6 km	MPC · JPL
790324	2018 PE_{162}	—	August 5, 2018	Haleakala	Pan-STARRS 1	·	1.1 km	MPC · JPL
790325	2018 QU_{3}	—	August 13, 2018	Haleakala	Pan-STARRS 1	·	2.2 km	MPC · JPL
790326	2018 QZ_{3}	—	February 14, 2013	Kitt Peak	Spacewatch	L4	5.9 km	MPC · JPL
790327	2018 QV_{4}	—	November 17, 2014	Haleakala	Pan-STARRS 1	GAL	1.5 km	MPC · JPL
790328	2018 QR_{7}	—	August 21, 2018	Haleakala	Pan-STARRS 1	EUN	910 m	MPC · JPL
790329	2018 QK_{8}	—	November 12, 2007	Mount Lemmon	Mount Lemmon Survey	·	1.8 km	MPC · JPL
790330	2018 QP_{11}	—	August 18, 2018	Haleakala	Pan-STARRS 1	·	1.9 km	MPC · JPL
790331	2018 QV_{11}	—	August 22, 2018	Haleakala	Pan-STARRS 1	·	2.0 km	MPC · JPL
790332	2018 QB_{12}	—	August 19, 2018	Haleakala	Pan-STARRS 1	·	1.5 km	MPC · JPL
790333	2018 QE_{12}	—	April 13, 2016	Mount Lemmon	Mount Lemmon Survey	·	2.4 km	MPC · JPL
790334	2018 QK_{12}	—	March 28, 2016	Cerro Tololo	DECam	·	2.2 km	MPC · JPL
790335	2018 QJ_{13}	—	September 28, 2013	Kitt Peak	Spacewatch	·	2.2 km	MPC · JPL
790336	2018 QL_{13}	—	August 22, 2018	Haleakala	Pan-STARRS 1	·	1.6 km	MPC · JPL
790337	2018 QH_{14}	—	April 18, 2015	Cerro Tololo	DECam	THB	1.6 km	MPC · JPL
790338	2018 QW_{15}	—	August 18, 2018	Haleakala	Pan-STARRS 1	EOS	1.3 km	MPC · JPL
790339	2018 QT_{16}	—	August 18, 2018	Haleakala	Pan-STARRS 1	KOR	920 m	MPC · JPL
790340	2018 QX_{16}	—	August 18, 2018	Haleakala	Pan-STARRS 1	·	1.2 km	MPC · JPL
790341	2018 QO_{17}	—	August 22, 2018	Haleakala	Pan-STARRS 1	·	2.0 km	MPC · JPL
790342	2018 QS_{17}	—	August 19, 2018	Haleakala	Pan-STARRS 1	·	1.4 km	MPC · JPL
790343	2018 QE_{18}	—	May 1, 2016	Cerro Tololo	DECam	·	2.0 km	MPC · JPL
790344	2018 QG_{18}	—	August 22, 2018	Haleakala	Pan-STARRS 1	·	2.0 km	MPC · JPL
790345	2018 QH_{18}	—	August 21, 2018	Haleakala	Pan-STARRS 1	·	850 m	MPC · JPL
790346	2018 QP_{18}	—	August 21, 2018	Haleakala	Pan-STARRS 1	·	1.5 km	MPC · JPL
790347	2018 QC_{23}	—	August 18, 2018	Haleakala	Pan-STARRS 1	BRA	950 m	MPC · JPL
790348	2018 QB_{24}	—	August 18, 2018	Haleakala	Pan-STARRS 1	·	1.8 km	MPC · JPL
790349	2018 QY_{24}	—	August 21, 2018	Haleakala	Pan-STARRS 1	TRE	1.8 km	MPC · JPL
790350	2018 QH_{25}	—	August 18, 2018	Haleakala	Pan-STARRS 1	·	1.8 km	MPC · JPL
790351	2018 QU_{25}	—	August 18, 2018	Haleakala	Pan-STARRS 1	·	1.4 km	MPC · JPL
790352	2018 QH_{31}	—	February 11, 2016	Mount Lemmon	Mount Lemmon Survey	·	980 m	MPC · JPL
790353	2018 QA_{35}	—	March 29, 2016	Cerro Tololo-DECam	DECam	·	2.3 km	MPC · JPL
790354	2018 RG_{10}	—	March 19, 2017	Mount Lemmon	Mount Lemmon Survey	·	1.4 km	MPC · JPL
790355	2018 RM_{10}	—	September 16, 2012	Parc National des Cévennes	Lopez, J.-M.	·	3.5 km	MPC · JPL
790356	2018 RR_{14}	—	September 7, 2004	Kitt Peak	Spacewatch	·	1.5 km	MPC · JPL
790357	2018 RG_{15}	—	November 6, 2013	Catalina	CSS	·	1.6 km	MPC · JPL
790358 Jānisstreičs	2018 RG_{17}	Jānisstreičs	September 10, 2018	Baldone	K. Černis, I. Eglītis	EOS	1.5 km	MPC · JPL
790359	2018 RD_{19}	—	September 14, 2014	Haleakala	Pan-STARRS 1	·	1.2 km	MPC · JPL
790360	2018 RT_{20}	—	June 21, 2018	Haleakala	Pan-STARRS 1	·	2.2 km	MPC · JPL
790361	2018 RM_{22}	—	July 16, 2013	Haleakala	Pan-STARRS 1	·	2.6 km	MPC · JPL
790362	2018 RR_{25}	—	July 9, 2005	Kitt Peak	Spacewatch	·	960 m	MPC · JPL
790363	2018 RK_{29}	—	May 30, 2017	Haleakala	Pan-STARRS 1	·	2.2 km	MPC · JPL
790364	2018 RV_{29}	—	April 12, 2011	Mount Lemmon	Mount Lemmon Survey	·	2.4 km	MPC · JPL
790365	2018 RK_{39}	—	April 18, 2015	Cerro Tololo	DECam	·	1.8 km	MPC · JPL
790366	2018 RL_{41}	—	September 6, 2018	Mount Lemmon	Mount Lemmon Survey	·	1.4 km	MPC · JPL
790367	2018 RS_{41}	—	September 8, 2018	Mount Lemmon	Mount Lemmon Survey	·	1.9 km	MPC · JPL
790368	2018 RT_{41}	—	March 29, 2016	Cerro Tololo-DECam	DECam	·	2.3 km	MPC · JPL
790369	2018 RD_{45}	—	September 13, 2018	Mount Lemmon	Mount Lemmon Survey	·	2.1 km	MPC · JPL
790370	2018 RS_{45}	—	September 12, 2018	Mount Lemmon	Mount Lemmon Survey	·	2.5 km	MPC · JPL
790371	2018 RU_{47}	—	August 19, 2018	Haleakala	Pan-STARRS 1	·	1.4 km	MPC · JPL
790372	2018 RB_{49}	—	August 8, 2012	Haleakala	Pan-STARRS 1	·	2.1 km	MPC · JPL
790373	2018 RQ_{49}	—	September 12, 2018	Mount Lemmon	Mount Lemmon Survey	·	1.3 km	MPC · JPL
790374	2018 RR_{49}	—	September 12, 2018	Mount Lemmon	Mount Lemmon Survey	·	2.0 km	MPC · JPL
790375	2018 RT_{49}	—	September 12, 2018	Mount Lemmon	Mount Lemmon Survey	EOS	1.6 km	MPC · JPL
790376	2018 RJ_{50}	—	September 9, 2018	Mount Lemmon	Mount Lemmon Survey	·	1.3 km	MPC · JPL
790377	2018 RS_{51}	—	September 10, 2018	Mount Lemmon	Mount Lemmon Survey	·	2.1 km	MPC · JPL
790378	2018 RX_{51}	—	September 24, 2009	Mount Lemmon	Mount Lemmon Survey	·	1.4 km	MPC · JPL
790379	2018 RZ_{51}	—	September 8, 2018	Mount Lemmon	Mount Lemmon Survey	·	1.8 km	MPC · JPL
790380	2018 RB_{52}	—	September 12, 2018	Mount Lemmon	Mount Lemmon Survey	·	1.1 km	MPC · JPL
790381	2018 RO_{53}	—	September 9, 2018	Mount Lemmon	Mount Lemmon Survey	·	2.4 km	MPC · JPL
790382	2018 RQ_{53}	—	September 7, 2018	Mount Lemmon	Mount Lemmon Survey	·	1.5 km	MPC · JPL
790383	2018 RT_{53}	—	August 11, 2012	Mayhill-ISON	L. Elenin	·	2.4 km	MPC · JPL
790384	2018 RC_{54}	—	September 12, 2018	Mount Lemmon	Mount Lemmon Survey	·	1.5 km	MPC · JPL
790385	2018 RV_{55}	—	November 12, 2001	Apache Point	SDSS	EUN	750 m	MPC · JPL
790386	2018 RL_{56}	—	September 10, 2018	Mount Lemmon	Mount Lemmon Survey	EUN	960 m	MPC · JPL
790387	2018 RO_{56}	—	September 14, 2018	Mount Lemmon	Mount Lemmon Survey	·	2.2 km	MPC · JPL
790388	2018 RC_{57}	—	August 14, 2018	Haleakala	Pan-STARRS 1	·	1.9 km	MPC · JPL
790389	2018 RN_{57}	—	August 14, 2018	Haleakala	Pan-STARRS 1	EOS	1.3 km	MPC · JPL
790390	2018 RP_{57}	—	October 28, 2014	Haleakala	Pan-STARRS 1	·	870 m	MPC · JPL
790391	2018 RC_{58}	—	February 5, 2016	Haleakala	Pan-STARRS 1	·	1.6 km	MPC · JPL
790392	2018 RD_{59}	—	September 11, 2018	Mount Lemmon	Mount Lemmon Survey	·	2.2 km	MPC · JPL
790393	2018 RJ_{60}	—	September 10, 2018	Mount Lemmon	Mount Lemmon Survey	·	1.6 km	MPC · JPL
790394	2018 RU_{60}	—	September 12, 2018	Mount Lemmon	Mount Lemmon Survey	·	2.5 km	MPC · JPL
790395	2018 RF_{61}	—	September 13, 2018	Mount Lemmon	Mount Lemmon Survey	·	2.4 km	MPC · JPL
790396	2018 RK_{61}	—	March 26, 2008	Mount Lemmon	Mount Lemmon Survey	·	1.1 km	MPC · JPL
790397	2018 RM_{61}	—	September 14, 2018	Mount Lemmon	Mount Lemmon Survey	T_{j} (2.98) · EUP	2.6 km	MPC · JPL
790398	2018 RJ_{62}	—	April 16, 2013	Haleakala	Pan-STARRS 1	EUN	980 m	MPC · JPL
790399	2018 RL_{62}	—	September 13, 2018	Mount Lemmon	Mount Lemmon Survey	·	1.4 km	MPC · JPL
790400	2018 RN_{62}	—	August 15, 2013	Haleakala	Pan-STARRS 1	·	1.6 km	MPC · JPL

== 790401–790500 ==
back to top

Designation			Discovery			Properties		Ref
Permanent	Provisional	Named after	Date	Site	Discoverer(s)	Category	Diam.	Ref
790401	2018 RZ_{64}	—	September 9, 2018	Mount Lemmon	Mount Lemmon Survey	·	1.1 km	MPC · JPL
790402	2018 RN_{65}	—	September 10, 2018	Mount Lemmon	Mount Lemmon Survey	·	1.3 km	MPC · JPL
790403	2018 RX_{65}	—	August 21, 2018	Haleakala	Pan-STARRS 1	·	1.8 km	MPC · JPL
790404	2018 RJ_{66}	—	October 21, 2007	Kitt Peak	Spacewatch	URS	2.0 km	MPC · JPL
790405	2018 RD_{69}	—	September 8, 2018	Mount Lemmon	Mount Lemmon Survey	·	900 m	MPC · JPL
790406	2018 RL_{76}	—	September 13, 2018	Mount Lemmon	Mount Lemmon Survey	HYG	2.0 km	MPC · JPL
790407	2018 RN_{77}	—	September 15, 2018	Mount Lemmon	Mount Lemmon Survey	·	2.0 km	MPC · JPL
790408	2018 RM_{78}	—	September 14, 2018	Mount Lemmon	Mount Lemmon Survey	·	1.5 km	MPC · JPL
790409	2018 RN_{79}	—	September 14, 2018	Mount Lemmon	Mount Lemmon Survey	·	2.0 km	MPC · JPL
790410	2018 RY_{80}	—	January 17, 2015	Haleakala	Pan-STARRS 1	TEL	900 m	MPC · JPL
790411	2018 RF_{81}	—	September 13, 2018	Mount Lemmon	Mount Lemmon Survey	·	1.3 km	MPC · JPL
790412	2018 RJ_{81}	—	September 14, 2018	Mount Lemmon	Mount Lemmon Survey	·	1.4 km	MPC · JPL
790413	2018 RE_{82}	—	September 7, 2018	Mount Lemmon	Mount Lemmon Survey	AGN	770 m	MPC · JPL
790414	2018 RZ_{109}	—	September 3, 2018	Cerro Tololo	DECam	·	1.8 km	MPC · JPL
790415	2018 RH_{113}	—	April 28, 2017	Haleakala	Pan-STARRS 1	·	790 m	MPC · JPL
790416	2018 RR_{124}	—	March 4, 2016	Haleakala	Pan-STARRS 1	·	2.1 km	MPC · JPL
790417	2018 RM_{127}	—	January 22, 2015	Haleakala	Pan-STARRS 1	·	3.3 km	MPC · JPL
790418	2018 RU_{130}	—	September 7, 2018	Mount Lemmon	Mount Lemmon Survey	·	2.2 km	MPC · JPL
790419	2018 RD_{131}	—	August 17, 2012	Haleakala	Pan-STARRS 1	·	2.2 km	MPC · JPL
790420	2018 RB_{132}	—	September 10, 2018	Mount Lemmon	Mount Lemmon Survey	·	2.0 km	MPC · JPL
790421	2018 SQ_{4}	—	March 29, 2016	Cerro Tololo-DECam	DECam	·	970 m	MPC · JPL
790422	2018 SF_{5}	—	July 9, 2013	Haleakala	Pan-STARRS 1	TIN	850 m	MPC · JPL
790423	2018 SB_{13}	—	October 15, 2007	Catalina	CSS	·	2.2 km	MPC · JPL
790424	2018 SR_{13}	—	December 5, 2015	Haleakala	Pan-STARRS 1	EUN	950 m	MPC · JPL
790425	2018 SH_{16}	—	September 21, 2018	Haleakala	Pan-STARRS 2	·	2.3 km	MPC · JPL
790426	2018 SC_{18}	—	September 21, 2018	Haleakala	Pan-STARRS 2	·	1.7 km	MPC · JPL
790427	2018 SJ_{18}	—	September 21, 2018	Haleakala	Pan-STARRS 2	·	1.7 km	MPC · JPL
790428	2018 SQ_{18}	—	September 17, 2018	Mount Lemmon	Mount Lemmon Survey	T_{j} (2.99)	3.2 km	MPC · JPL
790429	2018 ST_{18}	—	September 19, 2018	Haleakala	Pan-STARRS 2	HOF	1.8 km	MPC · JPL
790430	2018 SW_{18}	—	November 29, 2013	Haleakala	Pan-STARRS 1	TIR	1.6 km	MPC · JPL
790431	2018 SX_{18}	—	September 21, 2018	Mount Lemmon	Mount Lemmon Survey	·	1.5 km	MPC · JPL
790432	2018 SX_{19}	—	September 19, 2018	Haleakala	Pan-STARRS 2	·	1.5 km	MPC · JPL
790433	2018 SM_{20}	—	September 16, 2018	Kitt Peak	Spacewatch	·	2.4 km	MPC · JPL
790434	2018 SV_{20}	—	October 27, 2005	Kitt Peak	Spacewatch	·	1.3 km	MPC · JPL
790435	2018 SZ_{25}	—	September 30, 2018	Mount Lemmon	Mount Lemmon Survey	·	1.2 km	MPC · JPL
790436	2018 SC_{26}	—	September 18, 2018	Cerro Paranal	Gaia Ground Based Optical Tracking	·	1.4 km	MPC · JPL
790437	2018 TB_{8}	—	August 18, 2014	Haleakala	Pan-STARRS 1	·	940 m	MPC · JPL
790438	2018 TT_{10}	—	March 13, 2016	Haleakala	Pan-STARRS 1	·	1.1 km	MPC · JPL
790439	2018 TL_{11}	—	August 14, 2013	Haleakala	Pan-STARRS 1	·	1.5 km	MPC · JPL
790440	2018 TU_{16}	—	October 10, 2018	Haleakala	Pan-STARRS 2	·	2.5 km	MPC · JPL
790441	2018 TU_{17}	—	July 21, 2006	Mount Lemmon	Mount Lemmon Survey	·	2.2 km	MPC · JPL
790442	2018 TA_{18}	—	October 5, 2018	Mount Lemmon	Mount Lemmon Survey	·	1.6 km	MPC · JPL
790443	2018 TL_{18}	—	October 4, 2018	Haleakala	Pan-STARRS 2	·	1.8 km	MPC · JPL
790444	2018 TV_{19}	—	October 5, 2018	Mount Lemmon	Mount Lemmon Survey	·	1.6 km	MPC · JPL
790445	2018 TL_{20}	—	March 29, 2016	Cerro Tololo-DECam	DECam	THB	1.9 km	MPC · JPL
790446	2018 TM_{20}	—	October 10, 2018	Haleakala	Pan-STARRS 2	·	2.4 km	MPC · JPL
790447	2018 TW_{20}	—	October 5, 2018	Haleakala	Pan-STARRS 2	THB	1.6 km	MPC · JPL
790448	2018 TB_{21}	—	October 5, 2018	Haleakala	Pan-STARRS 2	LIX	2.5 km	MPC · JPL
790449	2018 TS_{21}	—	December 21, 2008	Mount Lemmon	Mount Lemmon Survey	·	1.4 km	MPC · JPL
790450	2018 TD_{24}	—	October 5, 2018	Mount Lemmon	Mount Lemmon Survey	·	2.4 km	MPC · JPL
790451	2018 TJ_{25}	—	October 4, 2018	Haleakala	Pan-STARRS 2	·	1.6 km	MPC · JPL
790452	2018 TL_{25}	—	October 4, 2018	Haleakala	Pan-STARRS 2	·	1.4 km	MPC · JPL
790453	2018 TV_{25}	—	October 5, 2018	Mount Lemmon	Mount Lemmon Survey	TIR	1.8 km	MPC · JPL
790454	2018 TA_{26}	—	April 4, 2016	Haleakala	Pan-STARRS 1	·	2.0 km	MPC · JPL
790455	2018 TF_{26}	—	October 10, 2018	Haleakala	Pan-STARRS 2	T_{j} (2.96)	1.9 km	MPC · JPL
790456	2018 TO_{26}	—	October 2, 2018	Haleakala	Pan-STARRS 2	THB	1.9 km	MPC · JPL
790457	2018 TT_{26}	—	October 6, 2018	Mount Lemmon	Mount Lemmon Survey	HOF	1.6 km	MPC · JPL
790458	2018 TZ_{26}	—	October 5, 2018	Mount Lemmon	Mount Lemmon Survey	·	1.5 km	MPC · JPL
790459	2018 TE_{27}	—	October 4, 2018	Haleakala	Pan-STARRS 2	THM	1.4 km	MPC · JPL
790460	2018 TZ_{28}	—	October 10, 2018	Haleakala	Pan-STARRS 2	·	2.3 km	MPC · JPL
790461	2018 TF_{29}	—	October 10, 2018	Mount Lemmon	Mount Lemmon Survey	·	1.9 km	MPC · JPL
790462	2018 TN_{29}	—	October 10, 2018	Haleakala	Pan-STARRS 2	·	1.3 km	MPC · JPL
790463	2018 TS_{29}	—	October 3, 2018	Haleakala	Pan-STARRS 2	HOF	1.8 km	MPC · JPL
790464	2018 TD_{30}	—	October 4, 2018	Haleakala	Pan-STARRS 2	HOF	1.8 km	MPC · JPL
790465	2018 TL_{30}	—	October 15, 2018	Haleakala	Pan-STARRS 2	·	1.6 km	MPC · JPL
790466	2018 TX_{30}	—	October 4, 2018	Haleakala	Pan-STARRS 2	EOS	1.2 km	MPC · JPL
790467	2018 TZ_{30}	—	October 2, 2018	Haleakala	Pan-STARRS 2	EOS	1.1 km	MPC · JPL
790468	2018 TK_{31}	—	October 5, 2018	Mount Lemmon	Mount Lemmon Survey	·	1.3 km	MPC · JPL
790469	2018 TN_{31}	—	October 5, 2018	Haleakala	Pan-STARRS 2	·	1.8 km	MPC · JPL
790470	2018 TQ_{31}	—	October 6, 2018	Mount Lemmon	Mount Lemmon Survey	LIX	2.2 km	MPC · JPL
790471	2018 TA_{32}	—	October 10, 2018	Haleakala	Pan-STARRS 2	·	1.7 km	MPC · JPL
790472	2018 TM_{34}	—	October 2, 2018	Haleakala	Pan-STARRS 2	·	970 m	MPC · JPL
790473	2018 TQ_{34}	—	January 20, 2015	Haleakala	Pan-STARRS 1	EOS	1.2 km	MPC · JPL
790474	2018 TK_{35}	—	April 5, 2016	Haleakala	Pan-STARRS 1	EOS	1.3 km	MPC · JPL
790475	2018 TJ_{36}	—	October 3, 2018	Haleakala	Pan-STARRS 2	·	2.4 km	MPC · JPL
790476	2018 TM_{36}	—	October 4, 2018	Haleakala	Pan-STARRS 2	·	1.3 km	MPC · JPL
790477	2018 TN_{36}	—	October 4, 2018	Haleakala	Pan-STARRS 2	·	1.6 km	MPC · JPL
790478	2018 TO_{36}	—	October 15, 2018	Haleakala	Pan-STARRS 2	VER	2.2 km	MPC · JPL
790479	2018 TS_{36}	—	October 4, 2018	Haleakala	Pan-STARRS 2	·	2.1 km	MPC · JPL
790480	2018 TU_{36}	—	April 19, 2015	Cerro Tololo	DECam	·	1.4 km	MPC · JPL
790481	2018 TC_{37}	—	October 5, 2018	Mount Lemmon	Mount Lemmon Survey	·	1.2 km	MPC · JPL
790482	2018 TB_{38}	—	October 10, 2018	Haleakala	Pan-STARRS 2	·	1.3 km	MPC · JPL
790483	2018 TD_{38}	—	October 5, 2018	Mount Lemmon	Mount Lemmon Survey	HOF	1.7 km	MPC · JPL
790484	2018 TO_{38}	—	October 3, 2018	Haleakala	Pan-STARRS 2	·	1.3 km	MPC · JPL
790485	2018 TX_{39}	—	August 16, 2009	Kitt Peak	Spacewatch	·	1.1 km	MPC · JPL
790486	2018 TY_{39}	—	October 10, 2018	Mount Lemmon	Mount Lemmon Survey	·	2.1 km	MPC · JPL
790487	2018 TG_{40}	—	October 5, 2018	Mount Lemmon	Mount Lemmon Survey	·	1.2 km	MPC · JPL
790488	2018 TY_{40}	—	October 10, 2018	Haleakala	Pan-STARRS 2	EOS	1.5 km	MPC · JPL
790489	2018 TA_{41}	—	October 5, 2018	Mount Lemmon	Mount Lemmon Survey	·	2.2 km	MPC · JPL
790490	2018 TG_{41}	—	April 30, 2016	Haleakala	Pan-STARRS 1	·	2.2 km	MPC · JPL
790491	2018 TN_{41}	—	October 3, 2018	Haleakala	Pan-STARRS 2	·	1.3 km	MPC · JPL
790492	2018 TJ_{42}	—	April 29, 2016	Mount Lemmon	Mount Lemmon Survey	EOS	1.3 km	MPC · JPL
790493	2018 TE_{44}	—	October 2, 2018	Haleakala	Pan-STARRS 2	KOR	920 m	MPC · JPL
790494	2018 TS_{44}	—	September 14, 2013	Haleakala	Pan-STARRS 1	·	1.6 km	MPC · JPL
790495	2018 TX_{44}	—	October 5, 2018	Haleakala	Pan-STARRS 2	·	1.2 km	MPC · JPL
790496	2018 TJ_{45}	—	October 15, 2018	Haleakala	Pan-STARRS 2	TIR	1.7 km	MPC · JPL
790497	2018 TR_{45}	—	November 28, 2013	Haleakala	Pan-STARRS 1	·	1.5 km	MPC · JPL
790498	2018 TU_{47}	—	October 10, 2018	Haleakala	Pan-STARRS 2	·	1.5 km	MPC · JPL
790499	2018 TA_{48}	—	January 17, 2015	Haleakala	Pan-STARRS 1	VER	1.9 km	MPC · JPL
790500	2018 TL_{48}	—	October 5, 2018	Mount Lemmon	Mount Lemmon Survey	KOR	950 m	MPC · JPL

== 790501–790600 ==
back to top

Designation			Discovery			Properties		Ref
Permanent	Provisional	Named after	Date	Site	Discoverer(s)	Category	Diam.	Ref
790501	2018 TZ_{48}	—	October 5, 2018	Haleakala	Pan-STARRS 2	·	2.1 km	MPC · JPL
790502	2018 TY_{53}	—	October 10, 2018	Haleakala	Pan-STARRS 2	·	1.1 km	MPC · JPL
790503	2018 TA_{57}	—	November 27, 2014	Haleakala	Pan-STARRS 1	·	1.2 km	MPC · JPL
790504	2018 TH_{57}	—	October 4, 2018	Haleakala	Pan-STARRS 2	·	890 m	MPC · JPL
790505	2018 TW_{58}	—	October 13, 2014	Mount Lemmon	Mount Lemmon Survey	·	720 m	MPC · JPL
790506	2018 TW_{59}	—	September 9, 2018	Mount Lemmon	Mount Lemmon Survey	EOS	1.2 km	MPC · JPL
790507	2018 TX_{64}	—	October 10, 2018	Haleakala	Pan-STARRS 2	·	2.1 km	MPC · JPL
790508	2018 TX_{65}	—	October 5, 2018	Mount Lemmon	Mount Lemmon Survey	·	1.9 km	MPC · JPL
790509	2018 TW_{69}	—	October 6, 2018	Mount Lemmon	Mount Lemmon Survey	·	1.6 km	MPC · JPL
790510	2018 TC_{70}	—	October 6, 2018	Mount Lemmon	Mount Lemmon Survey	·	1.4 km	MPC · JPL
790511	2018 TW_{70}	—	October 3, 2018	Haleakala	Pan-STARRS 2	KOR	1.0 km	MPC · JPL
790512	2018 TJ_{71}	—	December 21, 2014	Haleakala	Pan-STARRS 1	·	1.6 km	MPC · JPL
790513	2018 TK_{71}	—	October 4, 2018	Haleakala	Pan-STARRS 2	·	1.1 km	MPC · JPL
790514	2018 TL_{71}	—	October 4, 2018	Haleakala	Pan-STARRS 2	·	1.2 km	MPC · JPL
790515	2018 TN_{71}	—	October 10, 2018	Mount Lemmon	Mount Lemmon Survey	EOS	1.1 km	MPC · JPL
790516	2018 TX_{72}	—	October 6, 2018	Mount Lemmon	Mount Lemmon Survey	·	1.1 km	MPC · JPL
790517	2018 TG_{73}	—	October 5, 2018	Mount Lemmon	Mount Lemmon Survey	AGN	850 m	MPC · JPL
790518	2018 TY_{81}	—	October 5, 2018	Mount Lemmon	Mount Lemmon Survey	·	2.1 km	MPC · JPL
790519	2018 UL_{3}	—	March 20, 2015	Haleakala	Pan-STARRS 1	·	1.8 km	MPC · JPL
790520	2018 UR_{8}	—	January 30, 2004	Kitt Peak	Spacewatch	·	1.2 km	MPC · JPL
790521	2018 UD_{11}	—	January 24, 2015	Haleakala	Pan-STARRS 1	DOR	1.9 km	MPC · JPL
790522	2018 UH_{15}	—	November 29, 2013	Haleakala	Pan-STARRS 1	·	1.6 km	MPC · JPL
790523	2018 UK_{16}	—	October 6, 2018	Mount Lemmon	Mount Lemmon Survey	·	1.3 km	MPC · JPL
790524	2018 UG_{18}	—	October 30, 2007	Kitt Peak	Spacewatch	·	1.8 km	MPC · JPL
790525	2018 UF_{19}	—	December 5, 2007	Mount Lemmon	Mount Lemmon Survey	·	2.6 km	MPC · JPL
790526	2018 UT_{19}	—	November 5, 2018	Haleakala	Pan-STARRS 2	·	2.3 km	MPC · JPL
790527	2018 UT_{20}	—	October 22, 2018	Haleakala	Pan-STARRS 2	·	2.3 km	MPC · JPL
790528	2018 UZ_{21}	—	October 16, 2018	Haleakala	Pan-STARRS 2	·	2.5 km	MPC · JPL
790529	2018 US_{22}	—	October 21, 2018	Mount Lemmon	Mount Lemmon Survey	·	2.0 km	MPC · JPL
790530	2018 UE_{23}	—	September 19, 2009	Kitt Peak	Spacewatch	·	1.2 km	MPC · JPL
790531	2018 UY_{23}	—	October 20, 2018	Mount Lemmon	Mount Lemmon Survey	·	2.1 km	MPC · JPL
790532	2018 UC_{25}	—	October 18, 2018	Mount Lemmon	Mount Lemmon Survey	·	1.6 km	MPC · JPL
790533	2018 UL_{26}	—	October 21, 2018	Mount Lemmon	Mount Lemmon Survey	·	2.5 km	MPC · JPL
790534	2018 UO_{26}	—	October 18, 2018	Mount Lemmon	Mount Lemmon Survey	·	2.2 km	MPC · JPL
790535	2018 UT_{26}	—	October 17, 2018	Haleakala	Pan-STARRS 2	·	2.1 km	MPC · JPL
790536	2018 UE_{27}	—	October 29, 2018	Mount Lemmon	Mount Lemmon Survey	·	1.9 km	MPC · JPL
790537	2018 UK_{27}	—	October 17, 2018	Haleakala	Pan-STARRS 2	·	2.2 km	MPC · JPL
790538	2018 UO_{27}	—	October 21, 2018	Mount Lemmon	Mount Lemmon Survey	·	1.6 km	MPC · JPL
790539	2018 UV_{27}	—	October 20, 2018	Mount Lemmon	Mount Lemmon Survey	·	2.0 km	MPC · JPL
790540	2018 UN_{28}	—	October 18, 2018	Mount Lemmon	Mount Lemmon Survey	·	1.6 km	MPC · JPL
790541	2018 UP_{28}	—	October 17, 2018	Haleakala	Pan-STARRS 2	·	2.1 km	MPC · JPL
790542	2018 UR_{28}	—	October 17, 2018	Haleakala	Pan-STARRS 2	·	1.6 km	MPC · JPL
790543	2018 UT_{28}	—	April 18, 2015	Cerro Tololo	DECam	·	1.9 km	MPC · JPL
790544	2018 UZ_{28}	—	October 18, 2018	Mount Lemmon	Mount Lemmon Survey	EOS	1.3 km	MPC · JPL
790545	2018 UK_{30}	—	October 21, 2018	Mount Lemmon	Mount Lemmon Survey	·	1.9 km	MPC · JPL
790546	2018 UA_{33}	—	October 21, 2018	Mount Lemmon	Mount Lemmon Survey	·	2.7 km	MPC · JPL
790547	2018 UF_{33}	—	October 20, 2018	Mount Lemmon	Mount Lemmon Survey	·	1.5 km	MPC · JPL
790548	2018 UU_{33}	—	October 16, 2018	Haleakala	Pan-STARRS 2	HOF	1.8 km	MPC · JPL
790549	2018 UZ_{33}	—	October 17, 2018	Haleakala	Pan-STARRS 2	·	1.9 km	MPC · JPL
790550	2018 UC_{34}	—	October 17, 2018	Haleakala	Pan-STARRS 2	EOS	1.3 km	MPC · JPL
790551	2018 UD_{34}	—	October 16, 2018	Haleakala	Pan-STARRS 2	·	1.8 km	MPC · JPL
790552	2018 UF_{34}	—	October 17, 2018	Haleakala	Pan-STARRS 2	·	2.5 km	MPC · JPL
790553	2018 UQ_{34}	—	October 16, 2018	Haleakala	Pan-STARRS 2	·	1.3 km	MPC · JPL
790554	2018 US_{34}	—	October 18, 2018	Mount Lemmon	Mount Lemmon Survey	·	1.9 km	MPC · JPL
790555	2018 UG_{35}	—	October 18, 2018	Mount Lemmon	Mount Lemmon Survey	·	1.5 km	MPC · JPL
790556	2018 UC_{36}	—	October 17, 2018	Haleakala	Pan-STARRS 2	·	1.5 km	MPC · JPL
790557	2018 UR_{36}	—	October 18, 2018	Mount Lemmon	Mount Lemmon Survey	EOS	1.2 km	MPC · JPL
790558	2018 UU_{36}	—	March 28, 2016	Cerro Tololo	DECam	·	1.6 km	MPC · JPL
790559	2018 UV_{36}	—	October 20, 2018	Mount Lemmon	Mount Lemmon Survey	·	1.5 km	MPC · JPL
790560	2018 UJ_{40}	—	October 17, 2018	Haleakala	Pan-STARRS 2	·	1.8 km	MPC · JPL
790561	2018 UB_{41}	—	October 16, 2018	Haleakala	Pan-STARRS 2	·	2.0 km	MPC · JPL
790562	2018 UN_{49}	—	October 21, 2018	Mount Lemmon	Mount Lemmon Survey	·	1.4 km	MPC · JPL
790563	2018 UQ_{50}	—	October 18, 2018	Mount Lemmon	Mount Lemmon Survey	·	1.3 km	MPC · JPL
790564	2018 UJ_{51}	—	October 17, 2018	Haleakala	Pan-STARRS 2	EOS	1.2 km	MPC · JPL
790565	2018 UW_{51}	—	October 18, 2018	Mount Lemmon	Mount Lemmon Survey	EOS	1.3 km	MPC · JPL
790566	2018 UY_{51}	—	October 16, 2018	Haleakala	Pan-STARRS 2	·	1.5 km	MPC · JPL
790567	2018 UO_{52}	—	October 17, 2018	Haleakala	Pan-STARRS 2	EOS	1.1 km	MPC · JPL
790568	2018 UA_{53}	—	October 17, 2018	Haleakala	Pan-STARRS 2	·	1.2 km	MPC · JPL
790569	2018 VE_{12}	—	October 16, 2018	Haleakala	Pan-STARRS 2	·	1.3 km	MPC · JPL
790570	2018 VJ_{12}	—	November 1, 2018	Haleakala	Pan-STARRS 2	KOR	970 m	MPC · JPL
790571	2018 VX_{14}	—	April 29, 2008	Mount Lemmon	Mount Lemmon Survey	DOR	2.1 km	MPC · JPL
790572	2018 VD_{18}	—	October 18, 2018	Mount Lemmon	Mount Lemmon Survey	EOS	1.1 km	MPC · JPL
790573	2018 VG_{20}	—	November 11, 2013	Mount Lemmon	Mount Lemmon Survey	·	1.7 km	MPC · JPL
790574	2018 VQ_{24}	—	October 10, 2018	Haleakala	Pan-STARRS 2	·	1.6 km	MPC · JPL
790575	2018 VV_{27}	—	December 30, 2013	Haleakala	Pan-STARRS 1	·	1.8 km	MPC · JPL
790576	2018 VW_{27}	—	November 4, 2018	Mount Lemmon	Mount Lemmon Survey	AEG	2.1 km	MPC · JPL
790577	2018 VH_{28}	—	September 12, 2018	Mount Lemmon	Mount Lemmon Survey	·	2.4 km	MPC · JPL
790578	2018 VV_{30}	—	October 27, 2013	Catalina	CSS	·	2.6 km	MPC · JPL
790579	2018 VU_{32}	—	October 4, 2012	Mount Lemmon	Mount Lemmon Survey	EOS	1.4 km	MPC · JPL
790580	2018 VN_{40}	—	April 12, 2016	Haleakala	Pan-STARRS 1	·	1.4 km	MPC · JPL
790581	2018 VH_{41}	—	September 15, 2007	Kitt Peak	Spacewatch	·	2.1 km	MPC · JPL
790582	2018 VL_{41}	—	September 10, 2007	Mount Lemmon	Mount Lemmon Survey	·	1.4 km	MPC · JPL
790583	2018 VO_{44}	—	November 6, 2018	Haleakala	Pan-STARRS 2	·	1.8 km	MPC · JPL
790584	2018 VV_{45}	—	October 17, 2018	Haleakala	Pan-STARRS 2	·	1.6 km	MPC · JPL
790585	2018 VN_{47}	—	May 20, 2015	Cerro Tololo	DECam	·	2.3 km	MPC · JPL
790586	2018 VG_{48}	—	January 11, 2003	Kitt Peak	Spacewatch	·	1.7 km	MPC · JPL
790587	2018 VV_{48}	—	November 28, 2013	Mount Lemmon	Mount Lemmon Survey	·	1.5 km	MPC · JPL
790588	2018 VZ_{48}	—	November 1, 2018	Mount Lemmon	Mount Lemmon Survey	VER	1.7 km	MPC · JPL
790589	2018 VW_{49}	—	October 9, 2008	Mount Lemmon	Mount Lemmon Survey	·	1.3 km	MPC · JPL
790590	2018 VP_{52}	—	April 23, 2015	Haleakala	Pan-STARRS 1	·	1.8 km	MPC · JPL
790591	2018 VE_{53}	—	April 13, 2016	Mount Lemmon	Mount Lemmon Survey	EOS	1.3 km	MPC · JPL
790592	2018 VF_{54}	—	January 20, 2009	Kitt Peak	Spacewatch	·	1.7 km	MPC · JPL
790593	2018 VL_{54}	—	August 24, 2007	Kitt Peak	Spacewatch	·	1.3 km	MPC · JPL
790594	2018 VO_{56}	—	August 12, 2017	Haleakala	Pan-STARRS 1	·	1.6 km	MPC · JPL
790595	2018 VB_{57}	—	August 15, 2013	Haleakala	Pan-STARRS 1	·	1.1 km	MPC · JPL
790596	2018 VY_{61}	—	November 2, 2018	Mount Lemmon	Mount Lemmon Survey	·	2.3 km	MPC · JPL
790597	2018 VH_{64}	—	March 7, 2016	Haleakala	Pan-STARRS 1	·	1.8 km	MPC · JPL
790598	2018 VE_{65}	—	November 2, 2007	Kitt Peak	Spacewatch	THM	1.6 km	MPC · JPL
790599	2018 VF_{66}	—	March 10, 2016	Mount Lemmon	Mount Lemmon Survey	GEF	990 m	MPC · JPL
790600	2018 VJ_{66}	—	November 7, 2018	Haleakala	Pan-STARRS 2	·	1.5 km	MPC · JPL

== 790601–790700 ==
back to top

Designation			Discovery			Properties		Ref
Permanent	Provisional	Named after	Date	Site	Discoverer(s)	Category	Diam.	Ref
790601	2018 VR_{69}	—	October 4, 2007	Catalina	CSS	·	1.8 km	MPC · JPL
790602	2018 VY_{70}	—	October 9, 2007	Kitt Peak	Spacewatch	·	1.7 km	MPC · JPL
790603	2018 VA_{71}	—	November 27, 2013	Haleakala	Pan-STARRS 1	·	1.4 km	MPC · JPL
790604	2018 VQ_{78}	—	November 2, 2018	Mount Lemmon	Mount Lemmon Survey	·	1.6 km	MPC · JPL
790605	2018 VT_{79}	—	October 30, 2013	Kitt Peak	Spacewatch	·	1.6 km	MPC · JPL
790606	2018 VS_{81}	—	October 16, 2018	Haleakala	Pan-STARRS 2	·	1.5 km	MPC · JPL
790607	2018 VN_{85}	—	November 12, 2018	Mount Lemmon	Mount Lemmon Survey	·	2.1 km	MPC · JPL
790608	2018 VS_{85}	—	January 1, 2014	Kitt Peak	Spacewatch	·	2.0 km	MPC · JPL
790609	2018 VV_{85}	—	August 26, 2012	Haleakala	Pan-STARRS 1	·	2.0 km	MPC · JPL
790610	2018 VP_{88}	—	November 28, 2013	Mount Lemmon	Mount Lemmon Survey	·	1.3 km	MPC · JPL
790611	2018 VT_{88}	—	September 14, 2013	Mount Lemmon	Mount Lemmon Survey	·	1.8 km	MPC · JPL
790612	2018 VB_{89}	—	September 10, 2007	Mount Lemmon	Mount Lemmon Survey	·	1.4 km	MPC · JPL
790613	2018 VT_{89}	—	October 10, 2007	Kitt Peak	Spacewatch	·	1.8 km	MPC · JPL
790614	2018 VA_{90}	—	January 25, 2015	Haleakala	Pan-STARRS 1	·	1.3 km	MPC · JPL
790615	2018 VV_{90}	—	November 18, 2008	Kitt Peak	Spacewatch	·	1.1 km	MPC · JPL
790616	2018 VN_{91}	—	August 30, 2002	Kitt Peak	Spacewatch	·	1.4 km	MPC · JPL
790617	2018 VJ_{93}	—	March 13, 2016	Haleakala	Pan-STARRS 1	·	1.4 km	MPC · JPL
790618	2018 VA_{96}	—	February 18, 2015	Mount Lemmon	Mount Lemmon Survey	EOS	1.2 km	MPC · JPL
790619	2018 VH_{98}	—	October 1, 2008	Mount Lemmon	Mount Lemmon Survey	KOR	960 m	MPC · JPL
790620	2018 VG_{101}	—	November 1, 2018	Mount Lemmon	Mount Lemmon Survey	·	1.5 km	MPC · JPL
790621	2018 VL_{102}	—	March 16, 2009	Mount Lemmon	Mount Lemmon Survey	·	1.3 km	MPC · JPL
790622	2018 VZ_{105}	—	December 7, 2013	Haleakala	Pan-STARRS 1	·	1.5 km	MPC · JPL
790623	2018 VQ_{107}	—	October 16, 2018	Haleakala	Pan-STARRS 2	·	1.6 km	MPC · JPL
790624	2018 VZ_{107}	—	October 28, 2013	Mount Lemmon	Mount Lemmon Survey	·	1.5 km	MPC · JPL
790625	2018 VF_{111}	—	October 16, 2018	Haleakala	Pan-STARRS 2	·	2.2 km	MPC · JPL
790626	2018 VA_{113}	—	November 8, 2018	Mount Lemmon	Mount Lemmon Survey	·	1.7 km	MPC · JPL
790627	2018 VD_{113}	—	November 9, 2018	Haleakala	Pan-STARRS 2	·	2.3 km	MPC · JPL
790628	2018 VM_{114}	—	November 5, 2018	Haleakala	Pan-STARRS 2	EOS	1.2 km	MPC · JPL
790629	2018 VU_{114}	—	September 11, 2007	Catalina	CSS	·	1.8 km	MPC · JPL
790630	2018 VZ_{115}	—	November 4, 2007	Kitt Peak	Spacewatch	·	1.8 km	MPC · JPL
790631	2018 VB_{119}	—	September 14, 2007	Anderson Mesa	LONEOS	·	1.6 km	MPC · JPL
790632	2018 VW_{119}	—	January 16, 2015	Haleakala	Pan-STARRS 1	·	1.9 km	MPC · JPL
790633	2018 VF_{122}	—	November 10, 2018	Haleakala	Pan-STARRS 2	·	1.8 km	MPC · JPL
790634	2018 VG_{122}	—	November 9, 2018	Mount Lemmon	Mount Lemmon Survey	·	1.5 km	MPC · JPL
790635	2018 VJ_{122}	—	November 9, 2018	Mount Lemmon	Mount Lemmon Survey	·	1.3 km	MPC · JPL
790636	2018 VB_{123}	—	November 1, 2018	Mount Lemmon	Mount Lemmon Survey	·	1.3 km	MPC · JPL
790637	2018 VK_{123}	—	November 9, 2018	Mount Lemmon	Mount Lemmon Survey	·	1.5 km	MPC · JPL
790638	2018 VL_{123}	—	April 21, 2015	Cerro Tololo	DECam	·	1.6 km	MPC · JPL
790639	2018 VT_{123}	—	November 7, 2018	Mount Lemmon	Mount Lemmon Survey	·	2.3 km	MPC · JPL
790640	2018 VB_{124}	—	November 5, 2018	Mount Lemmon	Mount Lemmon Survey	·	1.3 km	MPC · JPL
790641	2018 VC_{124}	—	November 3, 2018	Mount Lemmon	Mount Lemmon Survey	·	2.4 km	MPC · JPL
790642	2018 VF_{124}	—	November 6, 2018	Haleakala	Pan-STARRS 2	TIR	1.9 km	MPC · JPL
790643	2018 VQ_{124}	—	November 8, 2018	Mount Lemmon	Mount Lemmon Survey	·	2.1 km	MPC · JPL
790644	2018 VR_{124}	—	November 6, 2018	Haleakala	Pan-STARRS 2	·	2.0 km	MPC · JPL
790645	2018 VT_{124}	—	May 20, 2015	Cerro Tololo	DECam	·	1.6 km	MPC · JPL
790646	2018 VA_{125}	—	November 2, 2018	Haleakala	Pan-STARRS 2	LIX	2.8 km	MPC · JPL
790647	2018 VG_{125}	—	November 2, 2018	Haleakala	Pan-STARRS 2	·	1.5 km	MPC · JPL
790648	2018 VO_{125}	—	November 1, 2018	Mount Lemmon	Mount Lemmon Survey	·	1.4 km	MPC · JPL
790649	2018 VQ_{126}	—	September 21, 2012	Mount Lemmon	Mount Lemmon Survey	TEL	1.0 km	MPC · JPL
790650	2018 VH_{127}	—	November 14, 2007	Mount Lemmon	Mount Lemmon Survey	THB	1.9 km	MPC · JPL
790651	2018 VJ_{127}	—	November 2, 2018	Mount Lemmon	Mount Lemmon Survey	·	1.9 km	MPC · JPL
790652	2018 VO_{127}	—	January 28, 2014	Mount Lemmon	Mount Lemmon Survey	·	2.0 km	MPC · JPL
790653	2018 VK_{128}	—	November 12, 2001	Apache Point	SDSS	·	2.2 km	MPC · JPL
790654	2018 VS_{128}	—	November 1, 2018	Haleakala	Pan-STARRS 2	·	2.3 km	MPC · JPL
790655	2018 VB_{129}	—	May 11, 2015	Mount Lemmon	Mount Lemmon Survey	·	1.9 km	MPC · JPL
790656	2018 VE_{129}	—	November 14, 2018	Haleakala	Pan-STARRS 2	·	1.9 km	MPC · JPL
790657	2018 VR_{129}	—	May 20, 2015	Cerro Tololo	DECam	·	1.7 km	MPC · JPL
790658	2018 VM_{130}	—	November 4, 2018	Mount Lemmon	Mount Lemmon Survey	·	1.6 km	MPC · JPL
790659	2018 VN_{131}	—	November 6, 2018	Haleakala	Pan-STARRS 2	·	1.6 km	MPC · JPL
790660	2018 VO_{131}	—	August 1, 2017	Haleakala	Pan-STARRS 1	·	2.2 km	MPC · JPL
790661	2018 VR_{131}	—	October 18, 2018	Mount Lemmon	Mount Lemmon Survey	·	1.9 km	MPC · JPL
790662	2018 VJ_{132}	—	November 2, 2018	Mount Lemmon	Mount Lemmon Survey	·	2.3 km	MPC · JPL
790663	2018 VK_{132}	—	November 8, 2018	Mount Lemmon	Mount Lemmon Survey	·	2.2 km	MPC · JPL
790664	2018 VM_{132}	—	November 5, 2018	Haleakala	Pan-STARRS 2	EOS	1.2 km	MPC · JPL
790665	2018 VP_{132}	—	November 6, 2018	Haleakala	Pan-STARRS 2	HOF	1.8 km	MPC · JPL
790666	2018 VT_{132}	—	November 2, 2018	Mount Lemmon	Mount Lemmon Survey	·	2.1 km	MPC · JPL
790667	2018 VX_{134}	—	November 4, 2018	Mount Lemmon	Mount Lemmon Survey	·	1.9 km	MPC · JPL
790668	2018 VD_{136}	—	April 18, 2015	Cerro Tololo	DECam	·	1.5 km	MPC · JPL
790669	2018 VZ_{137}	—	November 9, 2018	Haleakala	Pan-STARRS 2	·	1.8 km	MPC · JPL
790670	2018 VZ_{138}	—	November 7, 2018	Mount Lemmon	Mount Lemmon Survey	·	1.5 km	MPC · JPL
790671	2018 VF_{139}	—	November 8, 2018	Haleakala	Pan-STARRS 2	·	2.6 km	MPC · JPL
790672	2018 VN_{139}	—	November 6, 2018	Haleakala	Pan-STARRS 2	·	1.8 km	MPC · JPL
790673	2018 VP_{140}	—	November 9, 2018	Mount Lemmon	Mount Lemmon Survey	·	1.6 km	MPC · JPL
790674	2018 VR_{140}	—	November 9, 2018	Mount Lemmon	Mount Lemmon Survey	HYG	1.8 km	MPC · JPL
790675	2018 VC_{141}	—	November 9, 2018	Mount Lemmon	Mount Lemmon Survey	·	1.9 km	MPC · JPL
790676	2018 VQ_{141}	—	November 1, 2018	Haleakala	Pan-STARRS 2	·	1.7 km	MPC · JPL
790677	2018 VG_{142}	—	January 27, 2015	Haleakala	Pan-STARRS 1	·	1.6 km	MPC · JPL
790678	2018 VL_{142}	—	November 6, 2018	Haleakala	Pan-STARRS 2	·	1.6 km	MPC · JPL
790679	2018 VQ_{142}	—	November 9, 2018	Haleakala	Pan-STARRS 2	·	1.8 km	MPC · JPL
790680	2018 VE_{143}	—	October 18, 2007	Kitt Peak	Spacewatch	EOS	1.2 km	MPC · JPL
790681	2018 VD_{144}	—	November 1, 2018	Mount Lemmon	Mount Lemmon Survey	EOS	1.2 km	MPC · JPL
790682	2018 VO_{144}	—	November 5, 2018	Haleakala	Pan-STARRS 2	·	1.9 km	MPC · JPL
790683	2018 VU_{144}	—	November 28, 2013	Mount Lemmon	Mount Lemmon Survey	EOS	1.3 km	MPC · JPL
790684	2018 VZ_{144}	—	November 6, 2018	Haleakala	Pan-STARRS 2	·	1.6 km	MPC · JPL
790685	2018 VC_{145}	—	November 6, 2018	Haleakala	Pan-STARRS 2	·	1.7 km	MPC · JPL
790686	2018 VF_{145}	—	November 12, 2018	Mount Lemmon	Mount Lemmon Survey	EOS	1.0 km	MPC · JPL
790687	2018 VO_{145}	—	November 10, 2018	Mount Lemmon	Mount Lemmon Survey	·	1.2 km	MPC · JPL
790688	2018 VQ_{145}	—	November 7, 2018	Mount Lemmon	Mount Lemmon Survey	THB	2.3 km	MPC · JPL
790689	2018 VP_{146}	—	November 7, 2007	Kitt Peak	Spacewatch	·	1.7 km	MPC · JPL
790690	2018 VQ_{146}	—	May 20, 2015	Cerro Tololo	DECam	LIX	1.9 km	MPC · JPL
790691	2018 VX_{146}	—	November 7, 2018	Mount Lemmon	Mount Lemmon Survey	·	2.2 km	MPC · JPL
790692	2018 VZ_{146}	—	November 8, 2018	Mount Lemmon	Mount Lemmon Survey	·	2.3 km	MPC · JPL
790693	2018 VE_{148}	—	November 1, 2018	Mount Lemmon	Mount Lemmon Survey	·	1.4 km	MPC · JPL
790694	2018 VN_{149}	—	May 20, 2015	Cerro Tololo	DECam	THM	1.6 km	MPC · JPL
790695	2018 VM_{150}	—	November 6, 2018	Haleakala	Pan-STARRS 2	EOS	1.4 km	MPC · JPL
790696	2018 VY_{150}	—	November 2, 2018	Haleakala	Pan-STARRS 2	·	2.1 km	MPC · JPL
790697	2018 VE_{151}	—	November 8, 2018	Mount Lemmon	Mount Lemmon Survey	·	1.3 km	MPC · JPL
790698	2018 VM_{152}	—	November 10, 2018	Haleakala	Pan-STARRS 2	·	2.3 km	MPC · JPL
790699	2018 VP_{152}	—	November 8, 2018	Mount Lemmon	Mount Lemmon Survey	EOS	1.2 km	MPC · JPL
790700	2018 VT_{152}	—	November 2, 2018	Mount Lemmon	Mount Lemmon Survey	·	2.0 km	MPC · JPL

== 790701–790800 ==
back to top

Designation			Discovery			Properties		Ref
Permanent	Provisional	Named after	Date	Site	Discoverer(s)	Category	Diam.	Ref
790701	2018 VP_{153}	—	November 14, 2018	Haleakala	Pan-STARRS 2	·	2.2 km	MPC · JPL
790702	2018 VU_{153}	—	November 2, 2018	Haleakala	Pan-STARRS 2	·	1.5 km	MPC · JPL
790703	2018 VS_{154}	—	November 2, 2018	Mount Lemmon	Mount Lemmon Survey	·	1.6 km	MPC · JPL
790704	2018 VT_{154}	—	May 21, 2015	Cerro Tololo	DECam	·	1.5 km	MPC · JPL
790705	2018 VL_{155}	—	November 2, 2018	Haleakala	Pan-STARRS 2	EOS	1.2 km	MPC · JPL
790706	2018 VP_{156}	—	November 6, 2018	Haleakala	Pan-STARRS 2	·	1.4 km	MPC · JPL
790707	2018 VS_{158}	—	February 23, 2015	Haleakala	Pan-STARRS 1	EOS	1.2 km	MPC · JPL
790708	2018 VT_{158}	—	November 8, 2018	Haleakala	Pan-STARRS 2	EOS	1.4 km	MPC · JPL
790709	2018 VH_{170}	—	November 27, 2014	Haleakala	Pan-STARRS 1	·	860 m	MPC · JPL
790710	2018 VT_{174}	—	November 1, 2018	Mount Lemmon	Mount Lemmon Survey	·	1.2 km	MPC · JPL
790711	2018 VY_{174}	—	November 11, 2018	Mount Lemmon	Mount Lemmon Survey	EOS	1.1 km	MPC · JPL
790712	2018 VN_{179}	—	November 3, 2018	Mount Lemmon	Mount Lemmon Survey	·	2.0 km	MPC · JPL
790713	2018 VA_{180}	—	November 2, 2018	Haleakala	Pan-STARRS 2	·	1.7 km	MPC · JPL
790714	2018 VA_{181}	—	November 1, 2018	Mount Lemmon	Mount Lemmon Survey	·	1.8 km	MPC · JPL
790715	2018 VU_{183}	—	November 2, 2018	Mount Lemmon	Mount Lemmon Survey	·	1.6 km	MPC · JPL
790716	2018 VZ_{186}	—	November 5, 2018	Haleakala	Pan-STARRS 2	·	1.7 km	MPC · JPL
790717	2018 VG_{187}	—	November 9, 2018	Haleakala	Pan-STARRS 2	·	1.3 km	MPC · JPL
790718	2018 VL_{188}	—	November 9, 2018	Haleakala	Pan-STARRS 2	EOS	1.3 km	MPC · JPL
790719	2018 VM_{188}	—	November 10, 2018	Haleakala	Pan-STARRS 2	·	1.3 km	MPC · JPL
790720	2018 VV_{188}	—	January 22, 2015	Haleakala	Pan-STARRS 1	EOS	1.1 km	MPC · JPL
790721	2018 VE_{189}	—	November 7, 2018	Mount Lemmon	Mount Lemmon Survey	·	1.1 km	MPC · JPL
790722	2018 VV_{190}	—	November 9, 2018	Haleakala	Pan-STARRS 2	·	1.7 km	MPC · JPL
790723	2018 VT_{192}	—	December 29, 2014	Haleakala	Pan-STARRS 1	·	1.3 km	MPC · JPL
790724	2018 VU_{192}	—	December 29, 2014	Haleakala	Pan-STARRS 1	·	1.1 km	MPC · JPL
790725	2018 VF_{193}	—	November 6, 2018	Haleakala	Pan-STARRS 2	·	1.5 km	MPC · JPL
790726 Șerbu	2018 VL_{193}	Șerbu	November 5, 2018	Roque de los Muchachos	EURONEAR	·	1.6 km	MPC · JPL
790727	2018 VN_{193}	—	November 1, 2018	Mount Lemmon	Mount Lemmon Survey	·	2.2 km	MPC · JPL
790728	2018 WK_{3}	—	August 19, 2012	Siding Spring	SSS	·	2.0 km	MPC · JPL
790729	2018 WL_{5}	—	June 19, 2015	Haleakala	Pan-STARRS 1	·	1.8 km	MPC · JPL
790730	2018 WN_{5}	—	May 20, 2015	Cerro Tololo	DECam	·	1.9 km	MPC · JPL
790731	2018 WX_{5}	—	November 19, 2018	Haleakala	Pan-STARRS 2	·	2.4 km	MPC · JPL
790732	2018 WY_{5}	—	May 20, 2015	Cerro Tololo	DECam	·	2.1 km	MPC · JPL
790733	2018 WR_{6}	—	September 15, 2017	Haleakala	Pan-STARRS 1	·	1.7 km	MPC · JPL
790734	2018 WW_{6}	—	November 17, 2018	Mount Lemmon	Mount Lemmon Survey	EOS	1.4 km	MPC · JPL
790735	2018 WY_{7}	—	November 17, 2018	Mount Lemmon	Mount Lemmon Survey	·	2.1 km	MPC · JPL
790736	2018 WC_{8}	—	November 29, 2018	Mount Lemmon	Mount Lemmon Survey	EOS	1.6 km	MPC · JPL
790737	2018 WH_{8}	—	December 6, 2013	Haleakala	Pan-STARRS 1	·	1.9 km	MPC · JPL
790738	2018 WL_{8}	—	November 17, 2018	Mount Lemmon	Mount Lemmon Survey	·	2.2 km	MPC · JPL
790739	2018 WP_{8}	—	November 17, 2018	Mount Lemmon	Mount Lemmon Survey	·	1.6 km	MPC · JPL
790740	2018 WV_{8}	—	November 17, 2018	Mount Lemmon	Mount Lemmon Survey	·	1.9 km	MPC · JPL
790741	2018 WD_{10}	—	October 15, 2007	Kitt Peak	Spacewatch	·	1.9 km	MPC · JPL
790742	2018 WH_{10}	—	October 10, 2007	Kitt Peak	Spacewatch	EOS	1.3 km	MPC · JPL
790743	2018 WU_{11}	—	November 29, 2018	Mount Lemmon	Mount Lemmon Survey	·	2.4 km	MPC · JPL
790744	2018 WS_{16}	—	November 29, 2018	Mount Lemmon	Mount Lemmon Survey	·	2.1 km	MPC · JPL
790745	2018 WL_{17}	—	November 17, 2018	Mount Lemmon	Mount Lemmon Survey	·	1.5 km	MPC · JPL
790746	2018 WM_{17}	—	November 29, 2018	Mount Lemmon	Mount Lemmon Survey	·	2.8 km	MPC · JPL
790747	2018 XR	—	December 3, 2018	Haleakala	ATLAS	APO · PHA	680 m	MPC · JPL
790748	2018 XY_{3}	—	December 7, 2018	WISE	WISE	APO · PHA	430 m	MPC · JPL
790749	2018 XQ_{6}	—	May 21, 2015	Cerro Tololo	DECam	·	1.9 km	MPC · JPL
790750	2018 XN_{10}	—	January 7, 2006	Kitt Peak	Spacewatch	·	1.2 km	MPC · JPL
790751	2018 XF_{11}	—	April 10, 2016	Haleakala	Pan-STARRS 1	T_{j} (2.98)	2.8 km	MPC · JPL
790752	2018 XH_{11}	—	November 9, 2018	Haleakala	Pan-STARRS 2	·	2.1 km	MPC · JPL
790753	2018 XP_{12}	—	July 30, 2017	Haleakala	Pan-STARRS 1	·	2.3 km	MPC · JPL
790754	2018 XV_{12}	—	November 8, 2018	Mount Lemmon	Mount Lemmon Survey	·	2.4 km	MPC · JPL
790755	2018 XA_{13}	—	November 19, 2018	Haleakala	Pan-STARRS 2	·	2.3 km	MPC · JPL
790756	2018 XG_{16}	—	January 3, 2014	Catalina	CSS	·	2.3 km	MPC · JPL
790757	2018 XH_{17}	—	December 14, 2018	Haleakala	Pan-STARRS 1	·	2.4 km	MPC · JPL
790758	2018 XH_{19}	—	February 28, 2014	Haleakala	Pan-STARRS 1	·	1.9 km	MPC · JPL
790759	2018 XO_{21}	—	December 14, 2018	Haleakala	Pan-STARRS 1	·	1.8 km	MPC · JPL
790760	2018 XZ_{21}	—	December 12, 2018	Haleakala	Pan-STARRS 1	·	2.2 km	MPC · JPL
790761	2018 XM_{22}	—	December 12, 2018	Haleakala	Pan-STARRS 1	·	2.2 km	MPC · JPL
790762	2018 XQ_{24}	—	December 14, 2018	Haleakala	Pan-STARRS 1	HYG	1.7 km	MPC · JPL
790763	2018 XR_{24}	—	May 21, 2015	Cerro Tololo	DECam	HYG	2.0 km	MPC · JPL
790764	2018 XV_{24}	—	December 14, 2018	Haleakala	Pan-STARRS 1	EOS	1.3 km	MPC · JPL
790765	2018 XB_{25}	—	December 12, 2018	Haleakala	Pan-STARRS 1	EOS	1.5 km	MPC · JPL
790766	2018 XD_{25}	—	December 10, 2018	Kitt Peak	Spacewatch	·	1.5 km	MPC · JPL
790767	2018 XQ_{25}	—	December 14, 2018	Haleakala	Pan-STARRS 1	·	2.1 km	MPC · JPL
790768	2018 XV_{26}	—	May 7, 2014	Haleakala	Pan-STARRS 1	·	2.4 km	MPC · JPL
790769	2018 XF_{29}	—	December 12, 2018	Haleakala	Pan-STARRS 1	TIR	2.4 km	MPC · JPL
790770	2018 XO_{29}	—	December 12, 2018	Haleakala	Pan-STARRS 1	·	1.5 km	MPC · JPL
790771	2018 XH_{31}	—	January 4, 2019	Mount Lemmon	Mount Lemmon Survey	·	2.0 km	MPC · JPL
790772	2018 XK_{31}	—	November 18, 2007	Mount Lemmon	Mount Lemmon Survey	·	2.1 km	MPC · JPL
790773	2018 XY_{31}	—	May 7, 2014	Haleakala	Pan-STARRS 1	·	2.2 km	MPC · JPL
790774	2018 XJ_{32}	—	December 4, 2018	Mount Lemmon	Mount Lemmon Survey	·	2.2 km	MPC · JPL
790775	2018 XN_{32}	—	December 4, 2018	Mount Lemmon	Mount Lemmon Survey	EOS	1.2 km	MPC · JPL
790776	2018 XT_{32}	—	May 20, 2015	Cerro Tololo	DECam	·	1.8 km	MPC · JPL
790777	2018 XZ_{32}	—	November 29, 2018	Mount Lemmon	Mount Lemmon Survey	·	2.1 km	MPC · JPL
790778	2018 XR_{35}	—	December 10, 2018	Mount Lemmon	Mount Lemmon Survey	·	2.0 km	MPC · JPL
790779	2018 XT_{36}	—	December 8, 2018	Nauchnyi	G. Borisov	·	2.2 km	MPC · JPL
790780	2018 XD_{37}	—	December 10, 2018	Mount Lemmon	Mount Lemmon Survey	·	1.2 km	MPC · JPL
790781	2018 XJ_{42}	—	December 14, 2018	Haleakala	Pan-STARRS 1	·	2.0 km	MPC · JPL
790782	2018 XA_{44}	—	December 4, 2018	Mount Lemmon	Mount Lemmon Survey	·	2.4 km	MPC · JPL
790783	2018 XP_{44}	—	November 3, 2012	Mount Lemmon	Mount Lemmon Survey	HYG	1.8 km	MPC · JPL
790784	2018 XQ_{44}	—	December 12, 2018	Haleakala	Pan-STARRS 1	·	1.9 km	MPC · JPL
790785	2018 XO_{46}	—	December 10, 2018	Mount Lemmon	Mount Lemmon Survey	·	2.2 km	MPC · JPL
790786	2018 XS_{46}	—	December 14, 2018	Haleakala	Pan-STARRS 1	·	1.9 km	MPC · JPL
790787	2018 XP_{47}	—	December 12, 2018	Haleakala	Pan-STARRS 1	·	2.3 km	MPC · JPL
790788	2018 YF_{4}	—	December 31, 2013	Kitt Peak	Spacewatch	EOS	1.4 km	MPC · JPL
790789	2018 YV_{4}	—	October 27, 2017	Mount Lemmon	Mount Lemmon Survey	VER	1.9 km	MPC · JPL
790790	2018 YS_{5}	—	December 16, 2018	Haleakala	Pan-STARRS 1	·	2.2 km	MPC · JPL
790791	2018 YW_{6}	—	May 20, 2015	Cerro Tololo	DECam	·	1.9 km	MPC · JPL
790792	2018 YN_{8}	—	May 20, 2015	Cerro Tololo	DECam	·	1.9 km	MPC · JPL
790793	2018 YQ_{8}	—	December 17, 2018	Haleakala	Pan-STARRS 1	·	1.3 km	MPC · JPL
790794	2018 YR_{8}	—	April 17, 2009	Mauna Kea	P. A. Wiegert	·	1.6 km	MPC · JPL
790795	2018 YS_{8}	—	December 17, 2018	Haleakala	Pan-STARRS 1	·	1.9 km	MPC · JPL
790796	2018 YC_{9}	—	December 31, 2018	Haleakala	Pan-STARRS 1	EOS	1.3 km	MPC · JPL
790797	2018 YR_{9}	—	December 16, 2018	Haleakala	Pan-STARRS 1	·	2.3 km	MPC · JPL
790798	2018 YG_{11}	—	October 14, 2007	Mount Lemmon	Mount Lemmon Survey	EOS	1.3 km	MPC · JPL
790799	2018 YO_{11}	—	December 31, 2018	Haleakala	Pan-STARRS 1	·	1.7 km	MPC · JPL
790800	2018 YU_{11}	—	November 23, 2006	Kitt Peak	Spacewatch	·	2.1 km	MPC · JPL

== 790801–790900 ==
back to top

Designation			Discovery			Properties		Ref
Permanent	Provisional	Named after	Date	Site	Discoverer(s)	Category	Diam.	Ref
790801	2018 YC_{13}	—	May 21, 2015	Cerro Tololo	DECam	·	1.9 km	MPC · JPL
790802	2018 YG_{13}	—	December 16, 2018	Haleakala	Pan-STARRS 1	·	2.1 km	MPC · JPL
790803	2018 YD_{14}	—	December 17, 2018	Haleakala	Pan-STARRS 1	·	2.1 km	MPC · JPL
790804	2018 YU_{15}	—	July 14, 2016	Haleakala	Pan-STARRS 1	·	1.4 km	MPC · JPL
790805	2018 YE_{17}	—	October 14, 2017	Mount Lemmon	Mount Lemmon Survey	·	1.8 km	MPC · JPL
790806	2018 YZ_{17}	—	December 17, 2018	Haleakala	Pan-STARRS 1	·	1.9 km	MPC · JPL
790807	2018 YC_{18}	—	December 17, 2018	Haleakala	Pan-STARRS 1	·	2.1 km	MPC · JPL
790808	2018 YG_{24}	—	December 17, 2018	Haleakala	Pan-STARRS 1	HYG	2.1 km	MPC · JPL
790809	2018 YQ_{25}	—	December 3, 2012	Mount Lemmon	Mount Lemmon Survey	·	2.0 km	MPC · JPL
790810	2019 AZ_{15}	—	October 13, 2017	Mount Lemmon	Mount Lemmon Survey	·	2.1 km	MPC · JPL
790811	2019 AZ_{16}	—	April 1, 2009	Kitt Peak	Spacewatch	·	2.4 km	MPC · JPL
790812	2019 AK_{19}	—	December 7, 2013	Haleakala	Pan-STARRS 1	·	2.2 km	MPC · JPL
790813	2019 AT_{21}	—	January 10, 2014	Mount Lemmon	Mount Lemmon Survey	·	1.8 km	MPC · JPL
790814	2019 AB_{24}	—	December 12, 2012	Mount Lemmon	Mount Lemmon Survey	·	2.3 km	MPC · JPL
790815	2019 AM_{24}	—	May 16, 2009	Mount Lemmon	Mount Lemmon Survey	EUP	2.4 km	MPC · JPL
790816	2019 AF_{25}	—	April 12, 2010	WISE	WISE	·	2.0 km	MPC · JPL
790817	2019 AP_{26}	—	October 17, 2006	Kitt Peak	Spacewatch	·	2.5 km	MPC · JPL
790818	2019 AV_{26}	—	October 10, 2007	Mount Lemmon	Mount Lemmon Survey	·	1.4 km	MPC · JPL
790819	2019 AQ_{27}	—	December 12, 2018	Haleakala	Pan-STARRS 1	·	2.0 km	MPC · JPL
790820	2019 AL_{29}	—	April 19, 2015	Cerro Tololo	DECam	·	2.0 km	MPC · JPL
790821	2019 AC_{30}	—	September 26, 2017	Haleakala	Pan-STARRS 1	·	2.6 km	MPC · JPL
790822	2019 AE_{31}	—	November 6, 2012	Mount Lemmon	Mount Lemmon Survey	·	1.8 km	MPC · JPL
790823	2019 AT_{31}	—	April 18, 2015	Haleakala	Pan-STARRS 1	·	1.4 km	MPC · JPL
790824	2019 AN_{32}	—	October 19, 2012	Haleakala	Pan-STARRS 1	EOS	1.2 km	MPC · JPL
790825	2019 AA_{33}	—	December 22, 2018	Haleakala	Pan-STARRS 1	T_{j} (2.95)	2.9 km	MPC · JPL
790826	2019 AL_{33}	—	February 20, 2014	Mount Lemmon	Mount Lemmon Survey	·	2.0 km	MPC · JPL
790827	2019 AT_{35}	—	September 30, 2017	Haleakala	Pan-STARRS 1	·	2.2 km	MPC · JPL
790828	2019 AL_{42}	—	September 17, 2017	Haleakala	Pan-STARRS 1	EOS	1.5 km	MPC · JPL
790829	2019 AA_{43}	—	May 20, 2015	Cerro Tololo	DECam	ARM	2.5 km	MPC · JPL
790830	2019 AN_{43}	—	October 3, 1997	Kitt Peak	Spacewatch	·	870 m	MPC · JPL
790831	2019 AO_{45}	—	January 3, 2019	Haleakala	Pan-STARRS 1	·	2.3 km	MPC · JPL
790832	2019 AD_{47}	—	January 4, 2019	Haleakala	Pan-STARRS 1	·	2.7 km	MPC · JPL
790833	2019 AQ_{48}	—	February 9, 2008	Mount Lemmon	Mount Lemmon Survey	·	2.3 km	MPC · JPL
790834	2019 AE_{49}	—	January 15, 2008	Mount Lemmon	Mount Lemmon Survey	·	2.7 km	MPC · JPL
790835	2019 AK_{49}	—	January 5, 2019	Haleakala	Pan-STARRS 1	·	2.3 km	MPC · JPL
790836	2019 AL_{49}	—	February 2, 2008	Kitt Peak	Spacewatch	·	1.9 km	MPC · JPL
790837	2019 AR_{49}	—	January 7, 2019	Haleakala	Pan-STARRS 1	TIR	2.0 km	MPC · JPL
790838	2019 AX_{49}	—	January 3, 2019	Haleakala	Pan-STARRS 1	·	1.7 km	MPC · JPL
790839	2019 AC_{50}	—	January 12, 2019	Haleakala	Pan-STARRS 1	T_{j} (2.98)	2.3 km	MPC · JPL
790840	2019 AL_{50}	—	January 13, 2019	Haleakala	Pan-STARRS 1	·	2.4 km	MPC · JPL
790841	2019 AX_{52}	—	January 8, 2019	Haleakala	Pan-STARRS 1	·	2.7 km	MPC · JPL
790842	2019 AO_{54}	—	January 3, 2019	Haleakala	Pan-STARRS 1	·	1.4 km	MPC · JPL
790843	2019 AT_{54}	—	January 3, 2019	Haleakala	Pan-STARRS 1	VER	1.9 km	MPC · JPL
790844	2019 AT_{55}	—	January 4, 2019	Haleakala	Pan-STARRS 1	T_{j} (2.99) · (895)	2.8 km	MPC · JPL
790845	2019 AX_{55}	—	January 3, 2019	Haleakala	Pan-STARRS 1	·	1.7 km	MPC · JPL
790846	2019 AD_{56}	—	January 9, 2019	Haleakala	Pan-STARRS 1	TIR	2.5 km	MPC · JPL
790847	2019 AE_{56}	—	January 7, 2019	Haleakala	Pan-STARRS 1	EOS	1.4 km	MPC · JPL
790848	2019 AL_{56}	—	January 9, 2019	Haleakala	Pan-STARRS 1	·	2.3 km	MPC · JPL
790849	2019 AO_{57}	—	January 8, 2019	Haleakala	Pan-STARRS 1	·	2.4 km	MPC · JPL
790850	2019 AX_{57}	—	January 4, 2019	Haleakala	Pan-STARRS 1	·	2.7 km	MPC · JPL
790851	2019 AC_{58}	—	January 2, 2019	Haleakala	Pan-STARRS 1	·	2.1 km	MPC · JPL
790852	2019 AY_{58}	—	January 3, 2019	Haleakala	Pan-STARRS 1	·	2.6 km	MPC · JPL
790853	2019 AB_{59}	—	January 3, 2019	Haleakala	Pan-STARRS 1	·	1.9 km	MPC · JPL
790854	2019 AC_{59}	—	January 8, 2019	Haleakala	Pan-STARRS 1	·	1.8 km	MPC · JPL
790855	2019 AE_{59}	—	January 3, 2019	Haleakala	Pan-STARRS 1	·	2.2 km	MPC · JPL
790856	2019 AN_{59}	—	January 9, 2019	Haleakala	Pan-STARRS 1	·	1.7 km	MPC · JPL
790857	2019 AV_{59}	—	January 2, 2019	Haleakala	Pan-STARRS 1	·	2.1 km	MPC · JPL
790858	2019 AP_{60}	—	January 8, 2019	Haleakala	Pan-STARRS 1	·	2.0 km	MPC · JPL
790859	2019 AV_{61}	—	January 9, 2019	Haleakala	Pan-STARRS 1	·	1.2 km	MPC · JPL
790860	2019 AT_{64}	—	January 4, 2019	Mount Lemmon	Mount Lemmon Survey	·	2.3 km	MPC · JPL
790861	2019 AU_{64}	—	January 10, 2019	Haleakala	Pan-STARRS 1	·	1.7 km	MPC · JPL
790862	2019 AX_{64}	—	January 7, 2019	Haleakala	Pan-STARRS 1	·	2.1 km	MPC · JPL
790863	2019 AB_{66}	—	January 8, 2019	Haleakala	Pan-STARRS 1	·	1.6 km	MPC · JPL
790864	2019 AC_{66}	—	January 8, 2019	Haleakala	Pan-STARRS 1	·	2.4 km	MPC · JPL
790865	2019 AG_{66}	—	April 23, 2014	Cerro Tololo	DECam	·	2.1 km	MPC · JPL
790866	2019 AQ_{66}	—	April 15, 2015	Mount Lemmon	Mount Lemmon Survey	KOR	950 m	MPC · JPL
790867	2019 AV_{66}	—	January 4, 2019	Haleakala	Pan-STARRS 1	EOS	1.4 km	MPC · JPL
790868	2019 AU_{67}	—	April 29, 2014	Cerro Tololo	DECam	·	2.4 km	MPC · JPL
790869	2019 AQ_{68}	—	January 7, 2019	Haleakala	Pan-STARRS 1	·	1.5 km	MPC · JPL
790870	2019 AU_{68}	—	January 8, 2019	Haleakala	Pan-STARRS 1	·	1.9 km	MPC · JPL
790871	2019 AW_{68}	—	January 10, 2019	Haleakala	Pan-STARRS 1	·	2.0 km	MPC · JPL
790872	2019 AU_{69}	—	May 20, 2015	Cerro Tololo	DECam	·	1.7 km	MPC · JPL
790873	2019 AB_{70}	—	January 8, 2019	Haleakala	Pan-STARRS 1	·	2.1 km	MPC · JPL
790874	2019 AX_{70}	—	January 7, 2019	Haleakala	Pan-STARRS 1	EOS	1.6 km	MPC · JPL
790875	2019 AZ_{70}	—	January 9, 2019	Haleakala	Pan-STARRS 1	·	2.0 km	MPC · JPL
790876	2019 AO_{71}	—	January 8, 2019	Haleakala	Pan-STARRS 1	·	1.8 km	MPC · JPL
790877	2019 AY_{71}	—	January 12, 2019	Haleakala	Pan-STARRS 1	·	2.0 km	MPC · JPL
790878	2019 AN_{72}	—	January 14, 2019	Haleakala	Pan-STARRS 1	·	2.0 km	MPC · JPL
790879	2019 AN_{76}	—	January 13, 2019	Haleakala	Pan-STARRS 1	·	2.3 km	MPC · JPL
790880	2019 AB_{79}	—	January 20, 2015	Haleakala	Pan-STARRS 1	·	1.6 km	MPC · JPL
790881	2019 AL_{81}	—	January 2, 2019	Haleakala	Pan-STARRS 1	·	2.0 km	MPC · JPL
790882	2019 AV_{84}	—	January 8, 2019	Haleakala	Pan-STARRS 1	·	2.2 km	MPC · JPL
790883	2019 AJ_{87}	—	November 27, 2017	Mount Lemmon	Mount Lemmon Survey	·	2.3 km	MPC · JPL
790884	2019 AY_{87}	—	January 8, 2019	Haleakala	Pan-STARRS 1	·	2.2 km	MPC · JPL
790885	2019 AH_{92}	—	January 8, 2019	Haleakala	Pan-STARRS 1	·	2.3 km	MPC · JPL
790886	2019 AT_{92}	—	January 3, 2019	Haleakala	Pan-STARRS 1	·	2.7 km	MPC · JPL
790887	2019 AZ_{92}	—	January 8, 2019	Mount Lemmon	Mount Lemmon Survey	·	2.5 km	MPC · JPL
790888	2019 AL_{95}	—	January 9, 2019	Haleakala	Pan-STARRS 1	·	1.2 km	MPC · JPL
790889	2019 AS_{95}	—	January 2, 2019	Haleakala	Pan-STARRS 1	TIR	2.0 km	MPC · JPL
790890	2019 AK_{99}	—	September 23, 2017	Haleakala	Pan-STARRS 1	·	2.0 km	MPC · JPL
790891	2019 AA_{108}	—	December 12, 2012	Mount Lemmon	Mount Lemmon Survey	·	2.2 km	MPC · JPL
790892	2019 AG_{108}	—	January 3, 2019	Haleakala	Pan-STARRS 1	·	2.1 km	MPC · JPL
790893	2019 AQ_{108}	—	August 24, 2017	Haleakala	Pan-STARRS 1	·	1.8 km	MPC · JPL
790894	2019 AY_{108}	—	January 2, 2019	Haleakala	Pan-STARRS 1	·	2.2 km	MPC · JPL
790895	2019 AX_{109}	—	January 10, 2019	Haleakala	Pan-STARRS 1	·	3.3 km	MPC · JPL
790896	2019 AM_{110}	—	January 8, 2019	Haleakala	Pan-STARRS 1	·	1.4 km	MPC · JPL
790897	2019 AW_{110}	—	November 19, 2017	Haleakala	Pan-STARRS 1	·	2.1 km	MPC · JPL
790898	2019 AL_{111}	—	January 6, 2019	Haleakala	Pan-STARRS 1	·	2.1 km	MPC · JPL
790899	2019 AN_{111}	—	January 13, 2019	Haleakala	Pan-STARRS 1	·	2.3 km	MPC · JPL
790900	2019 AV_{111}	—	January 6, 2013	Kitt Peak	Spacewatch	·	2.1 km	MPC · JPL

== 790901–791000 ==
back to top

Designation			Discovery			Properties		Ref
Permanent	Provisional	Named after	Date	Site	Discoverer(s)	Category	Diam.	Ref
790901	2019 AX_{111}	—	January 3, 2019	Haleakala	Pan-STARRS 1	EOS	1.3 km	MPC · JPL
790902	2019 AZ_{111}	—	January 3, 2019	Haleakala	Pan-STARRS 1	·	2.0 km	MPC · JPL
790903	2019 AC_{112}	—	January 13, 2019	Haleakala	Pan-STARRS 1	·	1.9 km	MPC · JPL
790904	2019 AM_{114}	—	November 8, 2009	Mount Lemmon	Mount Lemmon Survey	·	1.3 km	MPC · JPL
790905	2019 AP_{117}	—	January 8, 2019	Haleakala	Pan-STARRS 1	·	2.0 km	MPC · JPL
790906	2019 AK_{128}	—	April 23, 2015	Haleakala	Pan-STARRS 1	KOR	890 m	MPC · JPL
790907	2019 AL_{131}	—	January 4, 2019	Haleakala	Pan-STARRS 1	·	2.3 km	MPC · JPL
790908	2019 AC_{132}	—	January 3, 2019	Haleakala	Pan-STARRS 1	·	2.0 km	MPC · JPL
790909	2019 AL_{132}	—	January 9, 2019	Mount Lemmon	Mount Lemmon Survey	·	2.0 km	MPC · JPL
790910	2019 AR_{132}	—	January 3, 2019	Haleakala	Pan-STARRS 1	·	1.6 km	MPC · JPL
790911	2019 BO_{1}	—	January 23, 2019	Haleakala	Pan-STARRS 2	APO	420 m	MPC · JPL
790912	2019 BL_{8}	—	March 11, 2014	Kitt Peak	Spacewatch	·	1.9 km	MPC · JPL
790913	2019 BU_{9}	—	January 16, 2019	Haleakala	Pan-STARRS 1	EOS	1.4 km	MPC · JPL
790914	2019 BA_{11}	—	January 16, 2013	Haleakala	Pan-STARRS 1	·	2.3 km	MPC · JPL
790915	2019 BG_{11}	—	January 16, 2019	Haleakala	Pan-STARRS 1	·	1.7 km	MPC · JPL
790916	2019 BB_{13}	—	August 29, 2016	Mount Lemmon	Mount Lemmon Survey	·	2.3 km	MPC · JPL
790917	2019 CL_{7}	—	January 3, 2019	Haleakala	Pan-STARRS 1	THB	2.1 km	MPC · JPL
790918	2019 CH_{13}	—	February 4, 2019	Haleakala	Pan-STARRS 1	·	2.2 km	MPC · JPL
790919	2019 CM_{16}	—	February 4, 2019	Haleakala	Pan-STARRS 1	·	1.7 km	MPC · JPL
790920	2019 CW_{21}	—	February 12, 2019	Mount Lemmon	Mount Lemmon Survey	·	2.4 km	MPC · JPL
790921	2019 CD_{22}	—	February 11, 2019	Mount Lemmon	Mount Lemmon Survey	DOR	1.3 km	MPC · JPL
790922	2019 CS_{22}	—	February 4, 2019	Haleakala	Pan-STARRS 1	·	930 m	MPC · JPL
790923	2019 CG_{24}	—	February 5, 2019	Haleakala	Pan-STARRS 1	·	2.4 km	MPC · JPL
790924	2019 CQ_{26}	—	April 26, 2014	Cerro Tololo	DECam	THM	1.8 km	MPC · JPL
790925	2019 CM_{27}	—	January 30, 2015	Haleakala	Pan-STARRS 1	·	870 m	MPC · JPL
790926	2019 CN_{27}	—	February 5, 2019	Haleakala	Pan-STARRS 1	·	2.1 km	MPC · JPL
790927	2019 FJ_{4}	—	March 14, 2002	Socorro	LINEAR	T_{j} (2.97)	2.9 km	MPC · JPL
790928	2019 FX_{15}	—	March 31, 2019	Mount Lemmon	Mount Lemmon Survey	EOS	1.4 km	MPC · JPL
790929	2019 FT_{21}	—	March 29, 2019	Mount Lemmon	Mount Lemmon Survey	·	2.5 km	MPC · JPL
790930	2019 FG_{24}	—	March 29, 2019	Mount Lemmon	Mount Lemmon Survey	URS	2.5 km	MPC · JPL
790931	2019 FH_{24}	—	September 19, 1998	Apache Point	SDSS	·	1.5 km	MPC · JPL
790932	2019 FL_{27}	—	March 29, 2019	Mount Lemmon	Mount Lemmon Survey	·	2.4 km	MPC · JPL
790933	2019 FQ_{27}	—	March 29, 2019	Kitt Peak	Spacewatch	·	2.3 km	MPC · JPL
790934	2019 FF_{28}	—	April 18, 2015	Cerro Tololo	DECam	·	820 m	MPC · JPL
790935	2019 FX_{28}	—	March 29, 2019	Mount Lemmon	Mount Lemmon Survey	·	2.3 km	MPC · JPL
790936	2019 FB_{29}	—	April 30, 2014	Haleakala	Pan-STARRS 1	·	1.8 km	MPC · JPL
790937	2019 FL_{32}	—	March 29, 2019	Mount Lemmon	Mount Lemmon Survey	·	1.3 km	MPC · JPL
790938	2019 GG_{2}	—	March 1, 2019	Mauna Loa	ATLAS	T_{j} (2.95)	3.1 km	MPC · JPL
790939	2019 GP_{11}	—	April 2, 2019	Haleakala	Pan-STARRS 1	·	1.7 km	MPC · JPL
790940	2019 GO_{14}	—	May 19, 2010	Mount Lemmon	Mount Lemmon Survey	·	1.4 km	MPC · JPL
790941	2019 GG_{18}	—	August 10, 2015	Haleakala	Pan-STARRS 1	·	2.5 km	MPC · JPL
790942	2019 GL_{18}	—	March 2, 2008	Kitt Peak	Spacewatch	·	2.2 km	MPC · JPL
790943	2019 GE_{29}	—	April 2, 2019	Haleakala	Pan-STARRS 1	TIR	1.8 km	MPC · JPL
790944	2019 GG_{49}	—	April 3, 2019	Haleakala	Pan-STARRS 1	·	1.6 km	MPC · JPL
790945	2019 GR_{49}	—	April 2, 2019	Haleakala	Pan-STARRS 1	L5	5.8 km	MPC · JPL
790946	2019 GA_{50}	—	April 2, 2019	Haleakala	Pan-STARRS 1	NEM	1.7 km	MPC · JPL
790947	2019 GN_{50}	—	April 3, 2019	Haleakala	Pan-STARRS 1	·	1.4 km	MPC · JPL
790948	2019 GK_{51}	—	April 2, 2019	Haleakala	Pan-STARRS 1	·	780 m	MPC · JPL
790949	2019 GS_{51}	—	June 19, 2015	Haleakala	Pan-STARRS 1	·	840 m	MPC · JPL
790950	2019 GU_{51}	—	April 3, 2019	Haleakala	Pan-STARRS 1	·	1.3 km	MPC · JPL
790951	2019 GA_{53}	—	April 5, 2019	Haleakala	Pan-STARRS 1	·	910 m	MPC · JPL
790952	2019 GE_{53}	—	April 5, 2019	Haleakala	Pan-STARRS 1	·	2.4 km	MPC · JPL
790953	2019 GP_{53}	—	April 3, 2019	Haleakala	Pan-STARRS 1	JUN	830 m	MPC · JPL
790954	2019 GC_{55}	—	April 6, 2019	Haleakala	Pan-STARRS 1	L5	6.9 km	MPC · JPL
790955	2019 GC_{65}	—	April 24, 2014	Cerro Tololo	DECam	·	1.2 km	MPC · JPL
790956	2019 GZ_{65}	—	April 5, 2019	Haleakala	Pan-STARRS 1	MAR	720 m	MPC · JPL
790957	2019 GE_{67}	—	May 20, 2015	Haleakala	Pan-STARRS 1	MAR	650 m	MPC · JPL
790958	2019 GF_{77}	—	April 3, 2019	Haleakala	Pan-STARRS 1	VER	1.9 km	MPC · JPL
790959	2019 GX_{80}	—	April 5, 2019	Haleakala	Pan-STARRS 1	·	1.2 km	MPC · JPL
790960	2019 GN_{83}	—	April 2, 2019	Haleakala	Pan-STARRS 1	KON	1.6 km	MPC · JPL
790961	2019 GY_{92}	—	May 20, 2015	Cerro Tololo	DECam	·	880 m	MPC · JPL
790962	2019 GC_{93}	—	April 3, 2019	Haleakala	Pan-STARRS 1	L5	7.2 km	MPC · JPL
790963	2019 GS_{93}	—	May 23, 2014	Haleakala	Pan-STARRS 1	·	2.1 km	MPC · JPL
790964	2019 GL_{96}	—	January 13, 2018	Haleakala	Pan-STARRS 1	·	2.3 km	MPC · JPL
790965	2019 GE_{106}	—	May 21, 2015	Haleakala	Pan-STARRS 1	·	1.2 km	MPC · JPL
790966	2019 GH_{106}	—	May 20, 2015	Cerro Tololo	DECam	·	880 m	MPC · JPL
790967	2019 GW_{107}	—	October 4, 2016	Mount Lemmon	Mount Lemmon Survey	·	2.3 km	MPC · JPL
790968	2019 GH_{108}	—	October 16, 2009	Mount Lemmon	Mount Lemmon Survey	·	2.9 km	MPC · JPL
790969	2019 GH_{112}	—	April 2, 2019	Haleakala	Pan-STARRS 1	EUN	740 m	MPC · JPL
790970	2019 GQ_{112}	—	April 2, 2019	Haleakala	Pan-STARRS 1	·	2.1 km	MPC · JPL
790971	2019 GF_{113}	—	April 8, 2019	Haleakala	Pan-STARRS 1	·	1.4 km	MPC · JPL
790972	2019 GL_{113}	—	April 5, 2019	Haleakala	Pan-STARRS 1	L5	6.5 km	MPC · JPL
790973	2019 GH_{114}	—	April 3, 2019	Haleakala	Pan-STARRS 1	L5	7.1 km	MPC · JPL
790974	2019 GO_{117}	—	January 12, 2018	Kitt Peak	Spacewatch	·	2.5 km	MPC · JPL
790975	2019 GW_{117}	—	April 5, 2019	Haleakala	Pan-STARRS 1	·	2.5 km	MPC · JPL
790976	2019 GG_{118}	—	April 3, 2019	Haleakala	Pan-STARRS 1	L5	6.0 km	MPC · JPL
790977	2019 GX_{118}	—	April 3, 2019	Haleakala	Pan-STARRS 1	L5	5.8 km	MPC · JPL
790978	2019 GA_{127}	—	April 5, 2019	Haleakala	Pan-STARRS 1	·	980 m	MPC · JPL
790979	2019 GE_{130}	—	August 14, 2015	Haleakala	Pan-STARRS 1	·	1.7 km	MPC · JPL
790980	2019 GT_{138}	—	April 24, 2014	Cerro Tololo	DECam	EOS	1.2 km	MPC · JPL
790981	2019 GO_{139}	—	June 28, 2010	WISE	WISE	·	1.4 km	MPC · JPL
790982	2019 GP_{140}	—	December 31, 2013	Kitt Peak	Spacewatch	·	1.5 km	MPC · JPL
790983	2019 GT_{152}	—	April 5, 2019	Haleakala	Pan-STARRS 1	·	2.3 km	MPC · JPL
790984	2019 GD_{154}	—	April 6, 2019	Haleakala	Pan-STARRS 1	·	2.2 km	MPC · JPL
790985	2019 GN_{170}	—	April 3, 2019	Haleakala	Pan-STARRS 1	L5	6.1 km	MPC · JPL
790986	2019 GQ_{172}	—	April 8, 2019	Haleakala	Pan-STARRS 1	L5	6.2 km	MPC · JPL
790987	2019 GF_{175}	—	December 29, 2011	Mount Lemmon	Mount Lemmon Survey	·	2.2 km	MPC · JPL
790988	2019 GO_{175}	—	June 24, 2014	Haleakala	Pan-STARRS 1	·	1.9 km	MPC · JPL
790989	2019 GQ_{189}	—	October 30, 2013	Haleakala	Pan-STARRS 1	·	690 m	MPC · JPL
790990	2019 HT	—	November 12, 2012	Mount Lemmon	Mount Lemmon Survey	·	2.2 km	MPC · JPL
790991	2019 HV_{10}	—	April 24, 2019	Haleakala	Pan-STARRS 1	L5	6.0 km	MPC · JPL
790992	2019 JD_{14}	—	August 31, 2005	Kitt Peak	Spacewatch	3:2 · SHU	3.8 km	MPC · JPL
790993	2019 JL_{28}	—	September 11, 2007	Mount Lemmon	Mount Lemmon Survey	·	1.3 km	MPC · JPL
790994	2019 JM_{29}	—	October 25, 2008	Mount Lemmon	Mount Lemmon Survey	·	950 m	MPC · JPL
790995	2019 JN_{52}	—	May 9, 2011	Mount Lemmon	Mount Lemmon Survey	3:2	4.4 km	MPC · JPL
790996	2019 JO_{62}	—	November 5, 2016	Mount Lemmon	Mount Lemmon Survey	·	1.2 km	MPC · JPL
790997	2019 JD_{63}	—	May 1, 2019	Haleakala	Pan-STARRS 1	·	980 m	MPC · JPL
790998	2019 JN_{63}	—	May 1, 2019	Haleakala	Pan-STARRS 1	·	1.2 km	MPC · JPL
790999	2019 JY_{63}	—	June 4, 2010	WISE	WISE	3:2 · SHU	4.2 km	MPC · JPL
791000	2019 JG_{72}	—	May 9, 2019	Haleakala	Pan-STARRS 1	·	1.1 km	MPC · JPL

back to top

== Meaning of names ==
As minor planet discoveries are confirmed, they are given a permanent number by the IAU's Minor Planet Center (MPC), and the discoverers can then submit names for them, following the IAU's naming conventions. The list below concerns those minor planets in the specified number-range that have received names, and explains the meanings of those names.

Official naming citations of newly named small Solar System bodies are approved and published in a bulletin by IAU's Working Group for Small Bodies Nomenclature (WGSBN). Before May 2021, citations were published in MPC's Minor Planet Circulars for many decades. Recent citations can also be found on the JPL Small-Body Database (SBDB). Until his death in 2016, German astronomer Lutz D. Schmadel compiled these citations into the Dictionary of Minor Planet Names (DMP) and regularly updated the collection.

Based on Paul Herget's The Names of the Minor Planets, Schmadel also researched the unclear origin of numerous asteroids, most of which had been named prior to World War II. This article incorporates text from this source, which is in the public domain: SBDB New namings may only be added to this list below after official publication as the preannouncement of names is condemned. The WGSBN publishes a comprehensive guideline for the naming rules of non-cometary small Solar System bodies.

Named minor planet	Provisional	This minor planet was named for...	Ref · Catalog
790358 Jānisstreičs	2018 RG_{17}	Jānis Streičs, one of the most prominent and beloved Latvian film directors.	IAU · 790358
790726 Șerbu	2018 VL_{193}	Florin Șerbu, Romanian physics teacher and former director of Carmen Sylva high school in Eforie Sud.	IAU · 790726
