= Meanings of minor-planet names: 359001–360000 =

As minor planet discoveries are confirmed, they are given a permanent number by the IAU's Minor Planet Center (MPC), and the discoverers can then submit names for them, following the IAU's naming conventions. The list below concerns those minor planets in the specified number-range that have received names, and explains the meanings of those names.

Official naming citations of newly named small Solar System bodies are approved and published in a bulletin by IAU's Working Group for Small Bodies Nomenclature (WGSBN). Before May 2021, citations were published in MPC's Minor Planet Circulars for many decades. Recent citations can also be found on the JPL Small-Body Database (SBDB). Until his death in 2016, German astronomer Lutz D. Schmadel compiled these citations into the Dictionary of Minor Planet Names (DMP) and regularly updated the collection.

Based on Paul Herget's The Names of the Minor Planets, Schmadel also researched the unclear origin of numerous asteroids, most of which had been named prior to World War II. This article incorporates text from this source, which is in the public domain: SBDB New namings may only be added to this list below after official publication as the preannouncement of names is condemned. The WGSBN publishes a comprehensive guideline for the naming rules of non-cometary small Solar System bodies.

== 359001–359100 ==
Named minor planet	Provisional	This minor planet was named for...	Ref · Catalog
There are no named minor planets in this number range

== 359101–359200 ==
back to top

Named minor planet	Provisional	This minor planet was named for...	Ref · Catalog
359103 Ottopiene	2009 BS	Otto Piene (1928–2014), a German artist, visionary and teacher who co-founded the ZERO group, directed MIT's Center for Advanced Visual Studies and coined the term "Sky Art".	JPL · 359103

== 359201–359300 ==
back to top

Named minor planet	Provisional	This minor planet was named for...	Ref · Catalog
There are no named minor planets in this number range

== 359301–359400 ==
back to top

Named minor planet	Provisional	This minor planet was named for...	Ref · Catalog
There are no named minor planets in this number range

== 359401–359500 ==
back to top

Named minor planet	Provisional	This minor planet was named for...	Ref · Catalog
359426 Lacks	2010 LA_{71}	Henrietta Lacks (1920–1951) was an American woman whose cancer cells, taken without her knowledge, became one of the most important tools in medicine. Her cells were used to develop the polio vaccine and other medical advances.	JPL · 359426
359474 Robertwilliams	2010 OQ_{4}	Robert Eugene Williams (born 1940), American astronomer who directed the Space Telescope Science Institute from 1993 to 1998.	JPL · 359474

== 359501–359600 ==
back to top

Named minor planet	Provisional	This minor planet was named for...	Ref · Catalog
There are no named minor planets in this number range

== 359601–359700 ==
back to top

Named minor planet	Provisional	This minor planet was named for...	Ref · Catalog
There are no named minor planets in this number range

== 359701–359800 ==
back to top

Named minor planet	Provisional	This minor planet was named for...	Ref · Catalog
There are no named minor planets in this number range

== 359801–359900 ==
back to top

Named minor planet	Provisional	This minor planet was named for...	Ref · Catalog
359822 Hansboesgaard	2011 UW_{298}	Hans Boesgaard (1928–2018), a Danish-American engineer.	IAU · 359822

== 359901–360000 ==
back to top

Named minor planet	Provisional	This minor planet was named for...	Ref · Catalog
There are no named minor planets in this number range

back to top

Preceded by 358,001–359,000	Meanings of minor-planet names List of minor planets: 359,001–360,000	Succeeded by 360,001–361,000
