= List of minor planets: 359001–360000 =

The following is a partial list of minor planets, running from minor-planet number 359001 through 360000, inclusive. The primary data for this and other partial lists is based on JPL's "Small-Body Orbital Elements" and data available from the Minor Planet Center. Critical list information is also provided by the MPC, unless otherwise specified from Lowell Observatory. A detailed description of the table's columns and additional sources are given on the main page including a complete list of every page in this series, and a statistical break-up on the dynamical classification of minor planets.

Also see the summary list of all named bodies in numerical and alphabetical order, and the corresponding naming citations for the number range of this particular list. New namings may only be added to this list after official publication, as the preannouncement of names is condemned by the Working Group for Small Bodies Nomenclature of the International Astronomical Union.

Near-Earth obj.	MBA (inner)	MBA (outer)	Centaur
Mars-crosser	MBA (middle)	Jupiter trojan	Trans-Neptunian obj.
Unclassified

== 359001–359100 ==
Designation			Discovery			Properties		Ref
Permanent	Provisional	Named after	Date	Site	Discoverer(s)	Category	Diam.	Ref
359001	2008 TP_{150}	—	August 10, 2007	Kitt Peak	Spacewatch	L4	10 km	MPC · JPL
359002	2008 TD_{190}	—	October 8, 2008	Mount Lemmon	Mount Lemmon Survey	PHO	1.4 km	MPC · JPL
359003	2008 UY_{4}	—	October 25, 2008	Sierra Stars	Tozzi, F.	·	2.0 km	MPC · JPL
359004	2008 UP_{23}	—	October 9, 2008	Mount Lemmon	Mount Lemmon Survey	L4	7.7 km	MPC · JPL
359005	2008 UE_{36}	—	October 20, 2008	Mount Lemmon	Mount Lemmon Survey	·	750 m	MPC · JPL
359006	2008 UR_{84}	—	October 23, 2008	Kitt Peak	Spacewatch	·	790 m	MPC · JPL
359007	2008 UJ_{122}	—	October 22, 2008	Kitt Peak	Spacewatch	·	750 m	MPC · JPL
359008	2008 UG_{179}	—	October 24, 2008	Kitt Peak	Spacewatch	·	740 m	MPC · JPL
359009	2008 UO_{184}	—	October 24, 2008	Kitt Peak	Spacewatch	·	890 m	MPC · JPL
359010	2008 UV_{203}	—	September 7, 2008	Mount Lemmon	Mount Lemmon Survey	·	710 m	MPC · JPL
359011	2008 UY_{205}	—	October 22, 2008	Kitt Peak	Spacewatch	L4	7.7 km	MPC · JPL
359012	2008 UD_{215}	—	October 24, 2008	Catalina	CSS	·	690 m	MPC · JPL
359013	2008 UV_{251}	—	October 27, 2008	Kitt Peak	Spacewatch	·	770 m	MPC · JPL
359014	2008 UG_{256}	—	October 27, 2008	Kitt Peak	Spacewatch	·	760 m	MPC · JPL
359015	2008 UM_{274}	—	October 28, 2008	Kitt Peak	Spacewatch	·	730 m	MPC · JPL
359016	2008 UD_{288}	—	October 28, 2008	Mount Lemmon	Mount Lemmon Survey	·	780 m	MPC · JPL
359017	2008 UA_{296}	—	October 29, 2008	Kitt Peak	Spacewatch	·	920 m	MPC · JPL
359018	2008 UC_{299}	—	October 29, 2008	Kitt Peak	Spacewatch	·	750 m	MPC · JPL
359019	2008 UN_{314}	—	October 30, 2008	Mount Lemmon	Mount Lemmon Survey	·	1.3 km	MPC · JPL
359020	2008 UP_{323}	—	October 31, 2008	Catalina	CSS	·	730 m	MPC · JPL
359021	2008 UL_{361}	—	October 31, 2008	Catalina	CSS	·	3.1 km	MPC · JPL
359022	2008 UU_{366}	—	December 7, 2005	Kitt Peak	Spacewatch	·	780 m	MPC · JPL
359023	2008 UO_{367}	—	October 24, 2008	Catalina	CSS	·	830 m	MPC · JPL
359024	2008 UW_{370}	—	October 29, 2008	Mount Lemmon	Mount Lemmon Survey	·	1.7 km	MPC · JPL
359025	2008 VM_{16}	—	November 1, 2008	Kitt Peak	Spacewatch	L4	6.8 km	MPC · JPL
359026	2008 VD_{46}	—	March 24, 2006	Kitt Peak	Spacewatch	·	940 m	MPC · JPL
359027	2008 VV_{51}	—	September 23, 2008	Kitt Peak	Spacewatch	·	810 m	MPC · JPL
359028	2008 VG_{68}	—	November 2, 2008	Mount Lemmon	Mount Lemmon Survey	(2076)	1.1 km	MPC · JPL
359029	2008 VA_{79}	—	November 8, 2008	Mount Lemmon	Mount Lemmon Survey	·	1.7 km	MPC · JPL
359030	2008 WC_{31}	—	November 19, 2008	Mount Lemmon	Mount Lemmon Survey	·	2.9 km	MPC · JPL
359031	2008 WF_{32}	—	November 19, 2008	Mount Lemmon	Mount Lemmon Survey	·	4.9 km	MPC · JPL
359032	2008 WQ_{45}	—	October 23, 2008	Kitt Peak	Spacewatch	·	930 m	MPC · JPL
359033	2008 WN_{63}	—	November 20, 2008	Socorro	LINEAR	·	1.4 km	MPC · JPL
359034	2008 WM_{69}	—	November 18, 2008	Kitt Peak	Spacewatch	·	790 m	MPC · JPL
359035	2008 WF_{74}	—	November 19, 2008	Mount Lemmon	Mount Lemmon Survey	·	1.5 km	MPC · JPL
359036	2008 WD_{87}	—	December 8, 2005	Kitt Peak	Spacewatch	·	800 m	MPC · JPL
359037	2008 WW_{98}	—	November 23, 2008	La Sagra	OAM	·	880 m	MPC · JPL
359038	2008 WC_{110}	—	September 29, 2008	Mount Lemmon	Mount Lemmon Survey	·	750 m	MPC · JPL
359039	2008 WN_{114}	—	November 30, 2008	Mount Lemmon	Mount Lemmon Survey	MAS	550 m	MPC · JPL
359040	2008 WW_{116}	—	November 30, 2008	Kitt Peak	Spacewatch	·	810 m	MPC · JPL
359041	2008 WN_{125}	—	November 21, 2008	Mount Lemmon	Mount Lemmon Survey	·	860 m	MPC · JPL
359042	2008 WT_{130}	—	September 4, 2000	Kitt Peak	Spacewatch	·	1.1 km	MPC · JPL
359043	2008 WA_{135}	—	November 30, 2008	Mount Lemmon	Mount Lemmon Survey	MAS	690 m	MPC · JPL
359044	2008 WG_{137}	—	November 22, 2008	Kitt Peak	Spacewatch	NYS	840 m	MPC · JPL
359045	2008 XT_{4}	—	December 3, 2008	Socorro	LINEAR	·	1.9 km	MPC · JPL
359046	2008 XL_{36}	—	December 2, 2008	Kitt Peak	Spacewatch	·	900 m	MPC · JPL
359047	2008 XY_{36}	—	November 19, 2008	Kitt Peak	Spacewatch	·	2.0 km	MPC · JPL
359048	2008 XN_{43}	—	November 24, 2008	Kitt Peak	Spacewatch	·	1.3 km	MPC · JPL
359049	2008 XR_{47}	—	December 4, 2008	Mount Lemmon	Mount Lemmon Survey	V	660 m	MPC · JPL
359050	2008 XP_{50}	—	December 4, 2008	Mount Lemmon	Mount Lemmon Survey	·	1.4 km	MPC · JPL
359051	2008 YE_{10}	—	December 20, 2008	Mount Lemmon	Mount Lemmon Survey	·	660 m	MPC · JPL
359052	2008 YH_{16}	—	December 21, 2008	Mount Lemmon	Mount Lemmon Survey	·	790 m	MPC · JPL
359053	2008 YC_{17}	—	November 8, 2008	Mount Lemmon	Mount Lemmon Survey	·	1.5 km	MPC · JPL
359054	2008 YC_{20}	—	December 21, 2008	Mount Lemmon	Mount Lemmon Survey	·	1.3 km	MPC · JPL
359055	2008 YZ_{20}	—	December 21, 2008	Mount Lemmon	Mount Lemmon Survey	NYS	1.3 km	MPC · JPL
359056	2008 YN_{24}	—	December 26, 2008	Bergisch Gladbach	W. Bickel	·	1.4 km	MPC · JPL
359057	2008 YA_{37}	—	December 22, 2008	Kitt Peak	Spacewatch	·	1.1 km	MPC · JPL
359058	2008 YY_{37}	—	December 26, 2008	Bergisch Gladbach	W. Bickel	·	950 m	MPC · JPL
359059	2008 YL_{49}	—	December 29, 2008	Mount Lemmon	Mount Lemmon Survey	·	1.5 km	MPC · JPL
359060	2008 YQ_{55}	—	December 29, 2008	Kitt Peak	Spacewatch	V	670 m	MPC · JPL
359061	2008 YR_{78}	—	December 30, 2008	Mount Lemmon	Mount Lemmon Survey	·	1.8 km	MPC · JPL
359062	2008 YO_{81}	—	December 31, 2008	Kitt Peak	Spacewatch	·	1.1 km	MPC · JPL
359063	2008 YF_{88}	—	December 29, 2008	Kitt Peak	Spacewatch	NYS	1.3 km	MPC · JPL
359064	2008 YT_{91}	—	February 10, 2002	Socorro	LINEAR	MAS	730 m	MPC · JPL
359065	2008 YB_{98}	—	December 29, 2008	Mount Lemmon	Mount Lemmon Survey	·	1.1 km	MPC · JPL
359066	2008 YB_{99}	—	December 29, 2008	Kitt Peak	Spacewatch	MAS	680 m	MPC · JPL
359067	2008 YV_{105}	—	December 29, 2008	Kitt Peak	Spacewatch	·	1.3 km	MPC · JPL
359068	2008 YW_{108}	—	December 29, 2008	Kitt Peak	Spacewatch	V	790 m	MPC · JPL
359069	2008 YH_{118}	—	December 29, 2008	Mount Lemmon	Mount Lemmon Survey	THM	2.1 km	MPC · JPL
359070	2008 YH_{122}	—	December 30, 2008	Kitt Peak	Spacewatch	·	940 m	MPC · JPL
359071	2008 YL_{126}	—	December 30, 2008	Kitt Peak	Spacewatch	·	1.1 km	MPC · JPL
359072	2008 YP_{127}	—	December 30, 2008	Kitt Peak	Spacewatch	·	1.7 km	MPC · JPL
359073	2008 YX_{132}	—	December 31, 2008	Kitt Peak	Spacewatch	NYS	1.4 km	MPC · JPL
359074	2008 YZ_{136}	—	December 30, 2008	Kitt Peak	Spacewatch	·	1.0 km	MPC · JPL
359075	2008 YP_{138}	—	December 30, 2008	Kitt Peak	Spacewatch	ADE	2.3 km	MPC · JPL
359076	2008 YF_{141}	—	December 30, 2008	Mount Lemmon	Mount Lemmon Survey	·	1.5 km	MPC · JPL
359077	2008 YX_{141}	—	December 30, 2008	Kitt Peak	Spacewatch	NYS	1.2 km	MPC · JPL
359078	2008 YC_{143}	—	December 30, 2008	Kitt Peak	Spacewatch	·	760 m	MPC · JPL
359079	2008 YF_{143}	—	December 30, 2008	Kitt Peak	Spacewatch	·	1.0 km	MPC · JPL
359080	2008 YO_{144}	—	December 30, 2008	Kitt Peak	Spacewatch	MAS	800 m	MPC · JPL
359081	2008 YC_{146}	—	December 22, 2008	Kitt Peak	Spacewatch	·	1.2 km	MPC · JPL
359082	2008 YQ_{149}	—	October 7, 2004	Socorro	LINEAR	·	1.5 km	MPC · JPL
359083	2008 YC_{151}	—	December 22, 2008	Mount Lemmon	Mount Lemmon Survey	·	1.0 km	MPC · JPL
359084	2008 YW_{151}	—	December 22, 2008	Mount Lemmon	Mount Lemmon Survey	NYS	1.2 km	MPC · JPL
359085	2008 YM_{154}	—	December 22, 2008	Mount Lemmon	Mount Lemmon Survey	·	1.3 km	MPC · JPL
359086	2008 YJ_{159}	—	December 30, 2008	Mount Lemmon	Mount Lemmon Survey	·	1.5 km	MPC · JPL
359087	2008 YQ_{165}	—	December 30, 2008	Mount Lemmon	Mount Lemmon Survey	NYS	1.2 km	MPC · JPL
359088	2008 YM_{168}	—	December 31, 2008	Catalina	CSS	·	1.3 km	MPC · JPL
359089	2008 YU_{172}	—	December 29, 2008	Mount Lemmon	Mount Lemmon Survey	MAS	770 m	MPC · JPL
359090	2009 AG	—	January 1, 2009	Mayhill	Lowe, A.	·	1.5 km	MPC · JPL
359091	2009 AL_{13}	—	January 2, 2009	Mount Lemmon	Mount Lemmon Survey	·	1.2 km	MPC · JPL
359092	2009 AG_{15}	—	January 5, 2009	Bisei SG Center	BATTeRS	·	1.7 km	MPC · JPL
359093	2009 AC_{17}	—	January 2, 2009	Mount Lemmon	Mount Lemmon Survey	NYS	1.3 km	MPC · JPL
359094	2009 AC_{21}	—	January 2, 2009	Kitt Peak	Spacewatch	·	1.3 km	MPC · JPL
359095	2009 AF_{26}	—	January 2, 2009	Kitt Peak	Spacewatch	·	1.4 km	MPC · JPL
359096	2009 AX_{28}	—	January 8, 2009	Kitt Peak	Spacewatch	·	1.4 km	MPC · JPL
359097	2009 AV_{33}	—	January 15, 2009	Kitt Peak	Spacewatch	·	1.0 km	MPC · JPL
359098	2009 AB_{38}	—	January 15, 2009	Kitt Peak	Spacewatch	MAS	750 m	MPC · JPL
359099	2009 AG_{42}	—	January 1, 2009	Kitt Peak	Spacewatch	·	910 m	MPC · JPL
359100	2009 AH_{42}	—	January 1, 2009	Mount Lemmon	Mount Lemmon Survey	·	1.6 km	MPC · JPL

== 359101–359200 ==
back to top

Designation			Discovery			Properties		Ref
Permanent	Provisional	Named after	Date	Site	Discoverer(s)	Category	Diam.	Ref
359101	2009 AB_{46}	—	November 1, 2008	Mount Lemmon	Mount Lemmon Survey	MAS	860 m	MPC · JPL
359102	2009 AN_{47}	—	January 3, 2009	Mount Lemmon	Mount Lemmon Survey	V	830 m	MPC · JPL
359103 Ottopiene	2009 BS	Ottopiene	January 16, 2009	Calar Alto	F. Hormuth	·	2.0 km	MPC · JPL
359104	2009 BP_{4}	—	December 15, 2004	Kitt Peak	Spacewatch	·	1.2 km	MPC · JPL
359105	2009 BD_{7}	—	January 18, 2009	Socorro	LINEAR	·	1.3 km	MPC · JPL
359106	2009 BJ_{7}	—	November 8, 2008	Mount Lemmon	Mount Lemmon Survey	·	1.3 km	MPC · JPL
359107	2009 BY_{8}	—	January 17, 2009	Socorro	LINEAR	NYS	1.2 km	MPC · JPL
359108	2009 BH_{23}	—	January 17, 2009	Kitt Peak	Spacewatch	·	1.3 km	MPC · JPL
359109	2009 BY_{23}	—	January 17, 2009	Kitt Peak	Spacewatch	·	1.1 km	MPC · JPL
359110	2009 BP_{27}	—	January 16, 2009	Kitt Peak	Spacewatch	·	920 m	MPC · JPL
359111	2009 BY_{28}	—	January 16, 2009	Kitt Peak	Spacewatch	·	1.4 km	MPC · JPL
359112	2009 BP_{30}	—	January 16, 2009	Kitt Peak	Spacewatch	·	1.2 km	MPC · JPL
359113	2009 BW_{31}	—	January 16, 2009	Kitt Peak	Spacewatch	NYS	1.3 km	MPC · JPL
359114	2009 BX_{38}	—	January 16, 2009	Kitt Peak	Spacewatch	·	1.4 km	MPC · JPL
359115	2009 BW_{43}	—	January 16, 2009	Kitt Peak	Spacewatch	·	1.1 km	MPC · JPL
359116	2009 BX_{44}	—	January 16, 2009	Kitt Peak	Spacewatch	MAS	810 m	MPC · JPL
359117	2009 BK_{45}	—	January 16, 2009	Kitt Peak	Spacewatch	·	1.6 km	MPC · JPL
359118	2009 BP_{48}	—	January 16, 2009	Kitt Peak	Spacewatch	·	1.4 km	MPC · JPL
359119	2009 BD_{49}	—	January 16, 2009	Mount Lemmon	Mount Lemmon Survey	ERI	1.7 km	MPC · JPL
359120	2009 BH_{49}	—	January 16, 2009	Mount Lemmon	Mount Lemmon Survey	·	1.2 km	MPC · JPL
359121	2009 BP_{51}	—	January 16, 2009	Mount Lemmon	Mount Lemmon Survey	MAS	840 m	MPC · JPL
359122	2009 BE_{52}	—	January 16, 2009	Mount Lemmon	Mount Lemmon Survey	V	670 m	MPC · JPL
359123	2009 BZ_{52}	—	January 16, 2009	Mount Lemmon	Mount Lemmon Survey	MAS	840 m	MPC · JPL
359124	2009 BC_{54}	—	October 1, 2000	Kitt Peak	Spacewatch	NYS	1.2 km	MPC · JPL
359125	2009 BL_{64}	—	January 20, 2009	Kitt Peak	Spacewatch	·	1.4 km	MPC · JPL
359126	2009 BJ_{65}	—	January 20, 2009	Kitt Peak	Spacewatch	·	1.1 km	MPC · JPL
359127	2009 BS_{65}	—	January 20, 2009	Kitt Peak	Spacewatch	·	1.2 km	MPC · JPL
359128	2009 BY_{66}	—	January 20, 2009	Kitt Peak	Spacewatch	·	1.7 km	MPC · JPL
359129	2009 BU_{70}	—	January 25, 2009	Kitt Peak	Spacewatch	NYS	1.5 km	MPC · JPL
359130	2009 BD_{72}	—	January 1, 2009	Kitt Peak	Spacewatch	·	1.4 km	MPC · JPL
359131	2009 BL_{77}	—	January 25, 2009	Socorro	LINEAR	BRA	2.0 km	MPC · JPL
359132	2009 BN_{78}	—	January 30, 2009	Pla D'Arguines	R. Ferrando	·	1.5 km	MPC · JPL
359133	2009 BR_{78}	—	January 30, 2009	Socorro	LINEAR	·	1.6 km	MPC · JPL
359134	2009 BB_{83}	—	January 20, 2009	Catalina	CSS	·	1.5 km	MPC · JPL
359135	2009 BZ_{85}	—	January 25, 2009	Kitt Peak	Spacewatch	MAS	740 m	MPC · JPL
359136	2009 BD_{86}	—	January 25, 2009	Kitt Peak	Spacewatch	MAS	760 m	MPC · JPL
359137	2009 BM_{87}	—	April 9, 2002	Anderson Mesa	LONEOS	·	1.4 km	MPC · JPL
359138	2009 BR_{88}	—	January 25, 2009	Kitt Peak	Spacewatch	·	1.1 km	MPC · JPL
359139	2009 BS_{88}	—	January 25, 2009	Kitt Peak	Spacewatch	·	1.0 km	MPC · JPL
359140	2009 BW_{91}	—	January 25, 2009	Kitt Peak	Spacewatch	·	1.3 km	MPC · JPL
359141	2009 BE_{92}	—	January 25, 2009	Kitt Peak	Spacewatch	·	1.3 km	MPC · JPL
359142	2009 BP_{94}	—	September 17, 2003	Kitt Peak	Spacewatch	CLA	1.9 km	MPC · JPL
359143	2009 BK_{96}	—	January 24, 2009	Purple Mountain	PMO NEO Survey Program	·	1.8 km	MPC · JPL
359144	2009 BQ_{96}	—	January 24, 2009	Purple Mountain	PMO NEO Survey Program	·	1.2 km	MPC · JPL
359145	2009 BU_{103}	—	January 25, 2009	Kitt Peak	Spacewatch	PHO	1.1 km	MPC · JPL
359146	2009 BL_{105}	—	January 25, 2009	Kitt Peak	Spacewatch	·	1.3 km	MPC · JPL
359147	2009 BZ_{106}	—	January 28, 2009	Catalina	CSS	NYS	1.3 km	MPC · JPL
359148	2009 BV_{111}	—	January 29, 2009	Kitt Peak	Spacewatch	V	690 m	MPC · JPL
359149	2009 BB_{117}	—	January 29, 2009	Mount Lemmon	Mount Lemmon Survey	·	1.7 km	MPC · JPL
359150	2009 BO_{119}	—	October 1, 2003	Kitt Peak	Spacewatch	NYS	1.4 km	MPC · JPL
359151	2009 BU_{119}	—	January 30, 2009	Kitt Peak	Spacewatch	NYS	1 km	MPC · JPL
359152	2009 BU_{120}	—	October 12, 2007	Mount Lemmon	Mount Lemmon Survey	·	1.7 km	MPC · JPL
359153	2009 BF_{124}	—	January 31, 2009	Kitt Peak	Spacewatch	V	680 m	MPC · JPL
359154	2009 BG_{127}	—	January 29, 2009	Kitt Peak	Spacewatch	NYS	1.1 km	MPC · JPL
359155	2009 BQ_{129}	—	January 30, 2009	Mount Lemmon	Mount Lemmon Survey	·	1.5 km	MPC · JPL
359156	2009 BA_{130}	—	January 31, 2009	Mount Lemmon	Mount Lemmon Survey	·	1.2 km	MPC · JPL
359157	2009 BK_{130}	—	January 31, 2009	Mount Lemmon	Mount Lemmon Survey	NYS	1.2 km	MPC · JPL
359158	2009 BT_{137}	—	January 29, 2009	Kitt Peak	Spacewatch	·	1.1 km	MPC · JPL
359159	2009 BR_{138}	—	January 29, 2009	Kitt Peak	Spacewatch	NYS	1.3 km	MPC · JPL
359160	2009 BN_{141}	—	January 16, 2009	Kitt Peak	Spacewatch	MAS	820 m	MPC · JPL
359161	2009 BF_{145}	—	January 30, 2009	Kitt Peak	Spacewatch	·	1.4 km	MPC · JPL
359162	2009 BD_{150}	—	January 31, 2009	Kitt Peak	Spacewatch	CLA	1.8 km	MPC · JPL
359163	2009 BN_{158}	—	January 31, 2009	Kitt Peak	Spacewatch	·	1.0 km	MPC · JPL
359164	2009 BS_{158}	—	January 31, 2009	Kitt Peak	Spacewatch	·	1.3 km	MPC · JPL
359165	2009 BM_{161}	—	January 31, 2009	Kitt Peak	Spacewatch	·	940 m	MPC · JPL
359166	2009 BD_{168}	—	January 24, 2009	Cerro Burek	Burek, Cerro	V	760 m	MPC · JPL
359167	2009 BM_{173}	—	January 20, 2009	Kitt Peak	Spacewatch	PHO	1.1 km	MPC · JPL
359168	2009 BH_{185}	—	January 25, 2009	Socorro	LINEAR	·	2.1 km	MPC · JPL
359169	2009 CX_{3}	—	February 2, 2009	Moletai	K. Černis, Zdanavicius, J.	·	1.2 km	MPC · JPL
359170	2009 CN_{5}	—	February 13, 2009	Črni Vrh	Matičič, S.	APO · PHA	360 m	MPC · JPL
359171	2009 CH_{12}	—	February 1, 2009	Kitt Peak	Spacewatch	NYS	1.1 km	MPC · JPL
359172	2009 CD_{14}	—	February 2, 2009	Mount Lemmon	Mount Lemmon Survey	PHO	1.5 km	MPC · JPL
359173	2009 CG_{17}	—	February 1, 2009	Mount Lemmon	Mount Lemmon Survey	·	1.0 km	MPC · JPL
359174	2009 CK_{20}	—	February 1, 2009	Kitt Peak	Spacewatch	·	1.0 km	MPC · JPL
359175	2009 CW_{20}	—	February 1, 2009	Kitt Peak	Spacewatch	·	1.2 km	MPC · JPL
359176	2009 CA_{22}	—	February 1, 2009	Kitt Peak	Spacewatch	NYS	1.3 km	MPC · JPL
359177	2009 CD_{23}	—	February 1, 2009	Kitt Peak	Spacewatch	·	1.2 km	MPC · JPL
359178	2009 CL_{30}	—	February 1, 2009	Kitt Peak	Spacewatch	·	1.3 km	MPC · JPL
359179	2009 CN_{33}	—	February 1, 2009	Kitt Peak	Spacewatch	·	1.2 km	MPC · JPL
359180	2009 CL_{35}	—	December 1, 2008	Mount Lemmon	Mount Lemmon Survey	·	1.5 km	MPC · JPL
359181	2009 CE_{37}	—	February 4, 2009	Catalina	CSS	NYS	1.2 km	MPC · JPL
359182	2009 CC_{38}	—	February 14, 2009	Dauban	Kugel, F.	MAS	760 m	MPC · JPL
359183	2009 CT_{40}	—	February 13, 2009	Kitt Peak	Spacewatch	·	990 m	MPC · JPL
359184	2009 CV_{41}	—	February 13, 2009	Kitt Peak	Spacewatch	NYS	1.2 km	MPC · JPL
359185	2009 CK_{45}	—	February 14, 2009	Kitt Peak	Spacewatch	V	730 m	MPC · JPL
359186	2009 CX_{45}	—	February 14, 2009	Kitt Peak	Spacewatch	·	1.5 km	MPC · JPL
359187	2009 CN_{48}	—	February 14, 2009	Kitt Peak	Spacewatch	·	1.2 km	MPC · JPL
359188	2009 CQ_{56}	—	February 4, 2009	Mount Lemmon	Mount Lemmon Survey	·	980 m	MPC · JPL
359189	2009 CO_{58}	—	February 3, 2009	Mount Lemmon	Mount Lemmon Survey	·	950 m	MPC · JPL
359190	2009 CT_{63}	—	February 14, 2009	Catalina	CSS	·	2.1 km	MPC · JPL
359191	2009 CD_{65}	—	February 3, 2009	Mount Lemmon	Mount Lemmon Survey	·	1.7 km	MPC · JPL
359192	2009 DZ_{4}	—	January 31, 2009	Kitt Peak	Spacewatch	V	700 m	MPC · JPL
359193	2009 DV_{5}	—	July 4, 2002	Kitt Peak	Spacewatch	·	1.8 km	MPC · JPL
359194	2009 DP_{11}	—	February 21, 2009	Skylive	Tozzi, F.	·	2.1 km	MPC · JPL
359195	2009 DQ_{11}	—	February 21, 2009	Mayhill	Lowe, A.	·	1.2 km	MPC · JPL
359196	2009 DV_{15}	—	December 30, 2008	Mount Lemmon	Mount Lemmon Survey	·	1.1 km	MPC · JPL
359197	2009 DD_{20}	—	February 16, 2009	Catalina	CSS	NYS	1.2 km	MPC · JPL
359198	2009 DU_{33}	—	February 20, 2009	Kitt Peak	Spacewatch	·	1.5 km	MPC · JPL
359199	2009 DJ_{44}	—	February 25, 2009	Dauban	Kugel, F.	·	1.7 km	MPC · JPL
359200	2009 DK_{45}	—	February 26, 2009	Socorro	LINEAR	·	1.5 km	MPC · JPL

== 359201–359300 ==
back to top

Designation			Discovery			Properties		Ref
Permanent	Provisional	Named after	Date	Site	Discoverer(s)	Category	Diam.	Ref
359201	2009 DQ_{56}	—	March 12, 2005	Kitt Peak	Deep Ecliptic Survey	·	730 m	MPC · JPL
359202	2009 DU_{57}	—	February 22, 2009	Kitt Peak	Spacewatch	·	1.4 km	MPC · JPL
359203	2009 DP_{58}	—	February 22, 2009	Kitt Peak	Spacewatch	·	1.0 km	MPC · JPL
359204	2009 DL_{60}	—	February 22, 2009	Kitt Peak	Spacewatch	·	1.1 km	MPC · JPL
359205	2009 DN_{61}	—	February 22, 2009	Kitt Peak	Spacewatch	·	1.1 km	MPC · JPL
359206	2009 DN_{67}	—	November 9, 2007	Kitt Peak	Spacewatch	·	1.8 km	MPC · JPL
359207	2009 DC_{72}	—	February 21, 2009	Kitt Peak	Spacewatch	·	1.7 km	MPC · JPL
359208	2009 DW_{74}	—	February 16, 2009	Catalina	CSS	·	1.7 km	MPC · JPL
359209	2009 DQ_{80}	—	February 22, 2009	Kitt Peak	Spacewatch	MAR	1.3 km	MPC · JPL
359210	2009 DQ_{81}	—	February 24, 2009	Kitt Peak	Spacewatch	V	750 m	MPC · JPL
359211	2009 DA_{83}	—	February 24, 2009	Kitt Peak	Spacewatch	·	1.2 km	MPC · JPL
359212	2009 DE_{89}	—	February 24, 2009	Kitt Peak	Spacewatch	·	1.2 km	MPC · JPL
359213	2009 DZ_{97}	—	February 26, 2009	Mount Lemmon	Mount Lemmon Survey	·	1.0 km	MPC · JPL
359214	2009 DR_{101}	—	February 26, 2009	Kitt Peak	Spacewatch	·	1.0 km	MPC · JPL
359215	2009 DV_{102}	—	February 26, 2009	Kitt Peak	Spacewatch	·	1.0 km	MPC · JPL
359216	2009 DM_{104}	—	February 26, 2009	Kitt Peak	Spacewatch	·	950 m	MPC · JPL
359217	2009 DY_{107}	—	February 24, 2009	Mount Lemmon	Mount Lemmon Survey	·	1.8 km	MPC · JPL
359218	2009 DO_{113}	—	February 27, 2009	Kitt Peak	Spacewatch	·	1.3 km	MPC · JPL
359219	2009 DQ_{116}	—	February 27, 2009	Kitt Peak	Spacewatch	·	980 m	MPC · JPL
359220	2009 DD_{117}	—	February 27, 2009	Kitt Peak	Spacewatch	·	1.0 km	MPC · JPL
359221	2009 DR_{120}	—	March 11, 2005	Mount Lemmon	Mount Lemmon Survey	·	1.3 km	MPC · JPL
359222	2009 DL_{125}	—	February 19, 2009	Kitt Peak	Spacewatch	·	1.5 km	MPC · JPL
359223	2009 DV_{126}	—	April 24, 2000	Kitt Peak	Spacewatch	·	2.0 km	MPC · JPL
359224	2009 DL_{127}	—	February 20, 2009	Mount Lemmon	Mount Lemmon Survey	·	1.2 km	MPC · JPL
359225	2009 DM_{127}	—	February 20, 2009	Kitt Peak	Spacewatch	·	1.5 km	MPC · JPL
359226	2009 DB_{134}	—	February 28, 2009	Kitt Peak	Spacewatch	·	950 m	MPC · JPL
359227	2009 DD_{138}	—	February 19, 2009	Kitt Peak	Spacewatch	·	1.1 km	MPC · JPL
359228	2009 DL_{138}	—	February 20, 2009	Kitt Peak	Spacewatch	·	1.3 km	MPC · JPL
359229	2009 DY_{138}	—	February 22, 2009	Siding Spring	SSS	·	4.7 km	MPC · JPL
359230	2009 DO_{139}	—	February 28, 2009	Kitt Peak	Spacewatch	·	2.8 km	MPC · JPL
359231	2009 DO_{142}	—	February 27, 2009	Mount Lemmon	Mount Lemmon Survey	·	2.8 km	MPC · JPL
359232	2009 EJ_{15}	—	March 15, 2009	Kitt Peak	Spacewatch	V	750 m	MPC · JPL
359233	2009 EJ_{16}	—	March 15, 2009	Kitt Peak	Spacewatch	NYS	1.3 km	MPC · JPL
359234	2009 EO_{16}	—	March 15, 2009	Kitt Peak	Spacewatch	·	1.7 km	MPC · JPL
359235	2009 EP_{17}	—	September 28, 2006	Mount Lemmon	Mount Lemmon Survey	JUN	1.2 km	MPC · JPL
359236	2009 EV_{18}	—	March 15, 2009	Kitt Peak	Spacewatch	·	1.1 km	MPC · JPL
359237	2009 EA_{20}	—	March 3, 2009	Catalina	CSS	·	1.8 km	MPC · JPL
359238	2009 EV_{26}	—	March 2, 2009	Kitt Peak	Spacewatch	·	1.3 km	MPC · JPL
359239	2009 EC_{28}	—	March 1, 2009	Kitt Peak	Spacewatch	·	1.3 km	MPC · JPL
359240	2009 EL_{28}	—	March 2, 2009	Mount Lemmon	Mount Lemmon Survey	·	1.9 km	MPC · JPL
359241	2009 EU_{28}	—	March 8, 2009	Mount Lemmon	Mount Lemmon Survey	·	1.9 km	MPC · JPL
359242	2009 FT	—	March 17, 2009	Catalina	CSS	APO	560 m	MPC · JPL
359243	2009 FW	—	March 16, 2009	Tzec Maun	Tozzi, F.	PHO	1.1 km	MPC · JPL
359244	2009 FO_{1}	—	March 16, 2009	La Sagra	OAM	·	2.1 km	MPC · JPL
359245	2009 FH_{2}	—	March 17, 2009	Marly	P. Kocher	MAR	1.3 km	MPC · JPL
359246	2009 FD_{3}	—	March 17, 2009	Mayhill	Lowe, A.	·	1.9 km	MPC · JPL
359247	2009 FZ_{7}	—	March 16, 2009	Kitt Peak	Spacewatch	·	1.2 km	MPC · JPL
359248	2009 FQ_{12}	—	March 18, 2009	Mount Lemmon	Mount Lemmon Survey	·	2.8 km	MPC · JPL
359249	2009 FD_{16}	—	March 17, 2009	Kitt Peak	Spacewatch	·	1.4 km	MPC · JPL
359250	2009 FU_{17}	—	January 30, 2009	Mount Lemmon	Mount Lemmon Survey	·	1.5 km	MPC · JPL
359251	2009 FF_{20}	—	March 17, 2009	Bergisch Gladbach	W. Bickel	·	1.7 km	MPC · JPL
359252	2009 FZ_{24}	—	March 22, 2009	La Sagra	OAM	·	1.2 km	MPC · JPL
359253	2009 FY_{25}	—	March 18, 2009	Mount Lemmon	Mount Lemmon Survey	·	1.4 km	MPC · JPL
359254	2009 FL_{28}	—	March 22, 2009	Hibiscus	Teamo, N.	(5)	1 km	MPC · JPL
359255	2009 FC_{32}	—	February 7, 1999	Kitt Peak	Spacewatch	·	3.0 km	MPC · JPL
359256	2009 FK_{32}	—	March 16, 2009	Kitt Peak	Spacewatch	·	1.3 km	MPC · JPL
359257	2009 FK_{33}	—	March 21, 2009	Catalina	CSS	·	1.4 km	MPC · JPL
359258	2009 FP_{36}	—	March 26, 2009	Mount Lemmon	Mount Lemmon Survey	NEM	2.1 km	MPC · JPL
359259	2009 FF_{41}	—	March 21, 2009	La Sagra	OAM	·	1.5 km	MPC · JPL
359260	2009 FQ_{43}	—	March 30, 2009	Sierra Stars	Tozzi, F.	BAR	1.1 km	MPC · JPL
359261	2009 FK_{56}	—	March 21, 2009	Catalina	CSS	·	1.6 km	MPC · JPL
359262	2009 FO_{56}	—	March 22, 2009	Siding Spring	SSS	HNS	1.6 km	MPC · JPL
359263	2009 FH_{60}	—	January 13, 2000	Kitt Peak	Spacewatch	·	1.5 km	MPC · JPL
359264	2009 FP_{63}	—	March 16, 2009	Kitt Peak	Spacewatch	·	1.4 km	MPC · JPL
359265	2009 FV_{63}	—	March 29, 2009	Kitt Peak	Spacewatch	·	1.1 km	MPC · JPL
359266	2009 FO_{67}	—	March 21, 2009	Mount Lemmon	Mount Lemmon Survey	·	900 m	MPC · JPL
359267	2009 FQ_{69}	—	March 18, 2009	Kitt Peak	Spacewatch	·	1.3 km	MPC · JPL
359268	2009 FQ_{71}	—	March 19, 2009	Kitt Peak	Spacewatch	·	1.6 km	MPC · JPL
359269	2009 FV_{74}	—	March 18, 2009	Catalina	CSS	·	1.6 km	MPC · JPL
359270	2009 FF_{76}	—	March 26, 2009	Mount Lemmon	Mount Lemmon Survey	·	1.6 km	MPC · JPL
359271	2009 FQ_{76}	—	March 31, 2009	Catalina	CSS	·	2.7 km	MPC · JPL
359272	2009 FT_{76}	—	March 19, 2009	Mount Lemmon	Mount Lemmon Survey	RAF	1.4 km	MPC · JPL
359273	2009 FL_{77}	—	March 13, 2005	Mount Lemmon	Mount Lemmon Survey	·	1.8 km	MPC · JPL
359274	2009 GY_{5}	—	April 1, 2009	Kitt Peak	Spacewatch	·	1.5 km	MPC · JPL
359275	2009 HB_{2}	—	January 8, 2009	Kitt Peak	Spacewatch	·	2.0 km	MPC · JPL
359276	2009 HR_{4}	—	April 17, 2009	Kitt Peak	Spacewatch	·	1.3 km	MPC · JPL
359277	2009 HF_{6}	—	April 17, 2009	Kitt Peak	Spacewatch	GEF	1.2 km	MPC · JPL
359278	2009 HJ_{6}	—	April 2, 2009	Kitt Peak	Spacewatch	WIT	1.2 km	MPC · JPL
359279	2009 HC_{7}	—	March 29, 2009	Kitt Peak	Spacewatch	·	1.4 km	MPC · JPL
359280	2009 HW_{7}	—	April 17, 2009	Kitt Peak	Spacewatch	·	2.0 km	MPC · JPL
359281	2009 HP_{8}	—	April 17, 2009	Kitt Peak	Spacewatch	·	1.9 km	MPC · JPL
359282	2009 HA_{19}	—	April 19, 2009	Mount Lemmon	Mount Lemmon Survey	·	1.7 km	MPC · JPL
359283	2009 HZ_{19}	—	April 17, 2009	Catalina	CSS	·	1.3 km	MPC · JPL
359284	2009 HM_{20}	—	April 18, 2009	Kitt Peak	Spacewatch	EUN	1.7 km	MPC · JPL
359285	2009 HM_{24}	—	April 17, 2009	Kitt Peak	Spacewatch	·	1.4 km	MPC · JPL
359286	2009 HD_{25}	—	April 17, 2009	Catalina	CSS	·	1.6 km	MPC · JPL
359287	2009 HO_{28}	—	April 2, 2009	Kitt Peak	Spacewatch	·	2.1 km	MPC · JPL
359288	2009 HE_{30}	—	April 19, 2009	Kitt Peak	Spacewatch	·	1.4 km	MPC · JPL
359289	2009 HL_{38}	—	April 18, 2009	Kitt Peak	Spacewatch	·	1.7 km	MPC · JPL
359290	2009 HK_{40}	—	April 20, 2009	Kitt Peak	Spacewatch	·	1.3 km	MPC · JPL
359291	2009 HN_{41}	—	April 20, 2009	Kitt Peak	Spacewatch	·	1.5 km	MPC · JPL
359292	2009 HR_{43}	—	April 20, 2009	Kitt Peak	Spacewatch	·	1.6 km	MPC · JPL
359293	2009 HL_{44}	—	April 1, 2009	Kitt Peak	Spacewatch	·	1.8 km	MPC · JPL
359294	2009 HS_{45}	—	April 21, 2009	La Sagra	OAM	·	2.1 km	MPC · JPL
359295	2009 HZ_{45}	—	April 22, 2009	La Sagra	OAM	·	1.1 km	MPC · JPL
359296	2009 HR_{49}	—	April 21, 2009	Kitt Peak	Spacewatch	·	1.6 km	MPC · JPL
359297	2009 HN_{77}	—	April 22, 2009	La Sagra	OAM	·	3.4 km	MPC · JPL
359298	2009 HL_{78}	—	April 24, 2009	Mount Lemmon	Mount Lemmon Survey	·	1.9 km	MPC · JPL
359299	2009 HA_{80}	—	April 27, 2009	Purple Mountain	PMO NEO Survey Program	ADE	3.2 km	MPC · JPL
359300	2009 HD_{83}	—	April 27, 2009	Kitt Peak	Spacewatch	WIT	1.1 km	MPC · JPL

== 359301–359400 ==
back to top

Designation			Discovery			Properties		Ref
Permanent	Provisional	Named after	Date	Site	Discoverer(s)	Category	Diam.	Ref
359301	2009 HN_{83}	—	March 25, 2009	Mount Lemmon	Mount Lemmon Survey	·	2.4 km	MPC · JPL
359302	2009 HM_{84}	—	April 27, 2009	Kitt Peak	Spacewatch	·	1.7 km	MPC · JPL
359303	2009 HL_{85}	—	March 26, 2009	Mount Lemmon	Mount Lemmon Survey	·	2.0 km	MPC · JPL
359304	2009 HN_{85}	—	April 29, 2009	Kitt Peak	Spacewatch	·	1.9 km	MPC · JPL
359305	2009 HO_{85}	—	April 29, 2009	Kitt Peak	Spacewatch	·	1.9 km	MPC · JPL
359306	2009 HD_{89}	—	April 24, 2009	Cerro Burek	Burek, Cerro	·	1.7 km	MPC · JPL
359307	2009 HY_{90}	—	April 21, 2009	Mount Lemmon	Mount Lemmon Survey	·	1.3 km	MPC · JPL
359308	2009 HT_{91}	—	April 29, 2009	Kitt Peak	Spacewatch	·	2.0 km	MPC · JPL
359309	2009 HG_{93}	—	April 30, 2009	Catalina	CSS	·	1.6 km	MPC · JPL
359310	2009 HH_{103}	—	April 18, 2009	Kitt Peak	Spacewatch	·	1.8 km	MPC · JPL
359311	2009 JQ_{1}	—	February 16, 2004	Kitt Peak	Spacewatch	·	1.8 km	MPC · JPL
359312	2009 JE_{2}	—	May 2, 2009	Siding Spring	SSS	·	3.1 km	MPC · JPL
359313	2009 JD_{6}	—	May 13, 2009	Kitt Peak	Spacewatch	JUN	1.3 km	MPC · JPL
359314	2009 JV_{6}	—	May 13, 2009	Mount Lemmon	Mount Lemmon Survey	·	1.7 km	MPC · JPL
359315	2009 JW_{6}	—	May 13, 2009	Kitt Peak	Spacewatch	·	1.9 km	MPC · JPL
359316	2009 JX_{6}	—	May 13, 2009	Kitt Peak	Spacewatch	·	2.0 km	MPC · JPL
359317	2009 JK_{7}	—	May 13, 2009	Kitt Peak	Spacewatch	·	1.5 km	MPC · JPL
359318	2009 JS_{12}	—	May 14, 2009	Kitt Peak	Spacewatch	·	1.3 km	MPC · JPL
359319	2009 JV_{12}	—	May 15, 2009	Catalina	CSS	JUN	1.1 km	MPC · JPL
359320	2009 JE_{18}	—	May 1, 2009	Mount Lemmon	Mount Lemmon Survey	·	1.7 km	MPC · JPL
359321	2009 KU_{3}	—	May 23, 2009	Catalina	CSS	EUN	1.1 km	MPC · JPL
359322	2009 KU_{11}	—	May 25, 2009	Kitt Peak	Spacewatch	·	1.9 km	MPC · JPL
359323	2009 KV_{14}	—	May 26, 2009	Catalina	CSS	·	3.0 km	MPC · JPL
359324	2009 KP_{15}	—	May 26, 2009	Kitt Peak	Spacewatch	·	2.0 km	MPC · JPL
359325	2009 KQ_{18}	—	May 27, 2009	Kitt Peak	Spacewatch	·	2.9 km	MPC · JPL
359326	2009 KN_{20}	—	May 29, 2009	Mount Lemmon	Mount Lemmon Survey	·	2.0 km	MPC · JPL
359327	2009 KW_{21}	—	May 29, 2009	Sandlot	G. Hug	·	3.0 km	MPC · JPL
359328	2009 KD_{28}	—	May 30, 2009	Mount Lemmon	Mount Lemmon Survey	·	1.9 km	MPC · JPL
359329	2009 MD_{7}	—	June 15, 2009	Kitt Peak	Spacewatch	·	2.3 km	MPC · JPL
359330	2009 OO_{6}	—	July 26, 2009	La Sagra	OAM	·	2.8 km	MPC · JPL
359331	2009 OD_{12}	—	July 27, 2009	Kitt Peak	Spacewatch	LIX	4.2 km	MPC · JPL
359332	2009 PD_{13}	—	December 22, 2006	7300	W. K. Y. Yeung	·	3.5 km	MPC · JPL
359333	2009 PG_{19}	—	August 15, 2009	Kitt Peak	Spacewatch	LIX	4.3 km	MPC · JPL
359334	2009 QV_{5}	—	August 17, 2009	Goodricke-Pigott	R. A. Tucker	·	4.4 km	MPC · JPL
359335	2009 QA_{14}	—	August 16, 2009	Kitt Peak	Spacewatch	·	3.7 km	MPC · JPL
359336	2009 QR_{38}	—	August 29, 2009	Cerro Burek	Burek, Cerro	H	480 m	MPC · JPL
359337	2009 QL_{43}	—	August 27, 2009	La Sagra	OAM	·	2.9 km	MPC · JPL
359338	2009 RW_{24}	—	August 17, 2009	Catalina	CSS	·	4.5 km	MPC · JPL
359339	2009 RL_{40}	—	September 15, 2009	Kitt Peak	Spacewatch	L4	10 km	MPC · JPL
359340	2009 RX_{73}	—	September 15, 2009	Kitt Peak	Spacewatch	L4	8.3 km	MPC · JPL
359341	2009 SS_{14}	—	October 13, 2004	Kitt Peak	Spacewatch	HYG	3.2 km	MPC · JPL
359342	2009 SV_{119}	—	September 18, 2009	Kitt Peak	Spacewatch	EUP	4.2 km	MPC · JPL
359343	2009 SE_{143}	—	September 19, 2009	Kitt Peak	Spacewatch	L4	7.5 km	MPC · JPL
359344	2009 SK_{175}	—	February 25, 2007	Kitt Peak	Spacewatch	·	3.6 km	MPC · JPL
359345	2009 SE_{198}	—	August 21, 2008	Kitt Peak	Spacewatch	L4	7.8 km	MPC · JPL
359346	2009 SE_{205}	—	September 22, 2009	Kitt Peak	Spacewatch	L4	8.6 km	MPC · JPL
359347	2009 SX_{207}	—	January 5, 2000	Kitt Peak	Spacewatch	L4	8.3 km	MPC · JPL
359348	2009 SB_{233}	—	September 17, 2004	Anderson Mesa	LONEOS	·	2.3 km	MPC · JPL
359349	2009 SG_{248}	—	September 23, 2009	Kitt Peak	Spacewatch	L4	7.1 km	MPC · JPL
359350	2009 SD_{254}	—	September 16, 2009	Kitt Peak	Spacewatch	L4	8.1 km	MPC · JPL
359351	2009 SH_{289}	—	September 18, 2009	Kitt Peak	Spacewatch	L4	8.5 km	MPC · JPL
359352	2009 SH_{290}	—	September 21, 2009	Kitt Peak	Spacewatch	L4	12 km	MPC · JPL
359353	2009 SX_{305}	—	September 17, 2009	Mount Lemmon	Mount Lemmon Survey	·	2.5 km	MPC · JPL
359354	2009 SG_{347}	—	September 28, 2009	Mount Lemmon	Mount Lemmon Survey	L4	9.0 km	MPC · JPL
359355	2009 SC_{355}	—	September 18, 2009	Kitt Peak	Spacewatch	L4	8.1 km	MPC · JPL
359356	2009 TT_{42}	—	October 12, 2009	Mount Lemmon	Mount Lemmon Survey	·	3.6 km	MPC · JPL
359357	2009 TM_{46}	—	October 11, 2009	Mount Lemmon	Mount Lemmon Survey	L4	9.3 km	MPC · JPL
359358	2009 TN_{46}	—	October 15, 2009	Mount Lemmon	Mount Lemmon Survey	L4	6.8 km	MPC · JPL
359359	2009 UV_{13}	—	October 19, 2009	Socorro	LINEAR	·	4.0 km	MPC · JPL
359360	2009 US_{28}	—	October 18, 2009	Mount Lemmon	Mount Lemmon Survey	L4 · (8060)	9.7 km	MPC · JPL
359361	2009 US_{55}	—	October 23, 2009	Mount Lemmon	Mount Lemmon Survey	L4 · ERY	10 km	MPC · JPL
359362	2009 UL_{102}	—	October 24, 2009	Mount Lemmon	Mount Lemmon Survey	EOS	2.2 km	MPC · JPL
359363	2009 UR_{105}	—	October 21, 2009	Mount Lemmon	Mount Lemmon Survey	L4	6.7 km	MPC · JPL
359364	2009 UF_{130}	—	October 20, 2009	Atacama	IAA-AI	L4	10 km	MPC · JPL
359365	2009 VN_{11}	—	November 8, 2009	Kitt Peak	Spacewatch	L4	7.4 km	MPC · JPL
359366	2009 VK_{20}	—	March 18, 2002	Kitt Peak	Spacewatch	L4	8.9 km	MPC · JPL
359367	2009 VR_{38}	—	November 9, 2009	Catalina	CSS	·	3.8 km	MPC · JPL
359368	2009 WC_{57}	—	November 16, 2009	Mount Lemmon	Mount Lemmon Survey	L4 · ERY	13 km	MPC · JPL
359369	2009 YG	—	December 17, 2009	Socorro	LINEAR	APO · PHA	700 m	MPC · JPL
359370	2009 YX_{14}	—	December 18, 2009	Mount Lemmon	Mount Lemmon Survey	·	1.2 km	MPC · JPL
359371	2010 AC_{27}	—	January 6, 2010	Kitt Peak	Spacewatch	H	620 m	MPC · JPL
359372	2010 CN_{189}	—	February 11, 2010	WISE	WISE	PHO	2.9 km	MPC · JPL
359373	2010 CX_{222}	—	February 8, 2010	WISE	WISE	PHO	2.1 km	MPC · JPL
359374	2010 DD_{18}	—	February 17, 2010	WISE	WISE	·	1.9 km	MPC · JPL
359375	2010 DU_{21}	—	February 17, 2010	Socorro	LINEAR	H	660 m	MPC · JPL
359376	2010 DW_{31}	—	February 17, 2010	WISE	WISE	·	1.5 km	MPC · JPL
359377	2010 EZ_{35}	—	February 16, 2010	Catalina	CSS	·	1.5 km	MPC · JPL
359378	2010 ED_{42}	—	March 12, 2010	Mount Lemmon	Mount Lemmon Survey	·	860 m	MPC · JPL
359379	2010 ED_{44}	—	March 12, 2010	Kitt Peak	Spacewatch	·	1.2 km	MPC · JPL
359380	2010 EO_{83}	—	March 12, 2010	Kitt Peak	Spacewatch	·	960 m	MPC · JPL
359381	2010 FE_{54}	—	March 20, 2010	Kitt Peak	Spacewatch	·	1.4 km	MPC · JPL
359382	2010 FA_{75}	—	March 30, 2010	WISE	WISE	·	1.1 km	MPC · JPL
359383	2010 FM_{92}	—	March 19, 2010	Kitt Peak	Spacewatch	·	720 m	MPC · JPL
359384	2010 GH_{29}	—	April 8, 2010	Mount Lemmon	Mount Lemmon Survey	·	640 m	MPC · JPL
359385	2010 GA_{123}	—	April 14, 2010	Kitt Peak	Spacewatch	·	800 m	MPC · JPL
359386	2010 GQ_{126}	—	March 25, 2010	Mount Lemmon	Mount Lemmon Survey	·	750 m	MPC · JPL
359387	2010 GU_{127}	—	April 10, 2010	Mount Lemmon	Mount Lemmon Survey	V	750 m	MPC · JPL
359388	2010 GR_{131}	—	November 22, 2005	Kitt Peak	Spacewatch	·	550 m	MPC · JPL
359389	2010 GE_{153}	—	April 15, 2010	WISE	WISE	·	3.1 km	MPC · JPL
359390	2010 GO_{154}	—	April 15, 2010	WISE	WISE	·	2.5 km	MPC · JPL
359391	2010 GU_{171}	—	August 24, 2011	Haleakala	Pan-STARRS 1	·	1.6 km	MPC · JPL
359392	2010 HF_{6}	—	April 16, 2010	WISE	WISE	·	1.9 km	MPC · JPL
359393	2010 HC_{20}	—	April 17, 2010	Mount Lemmon	Mount Lemmon Survey	·	1.6 km	MPC · JPL
359394	2010 HE_{55}	—	April 25, 2010	WISE	WISE	·	1.2 km	MPC · JPL
359395	2010 HM_{79}	—	April 20, 2010	Kitt Peak	Spacewatch	·	1.3 km	MPC · JPL
359396	2010 HS_{82}	—	April 28, 2010	WISE	WISE	·	2.4 km	MPC · JPL
359397	2010 HF_{106}	—	March 26, 2006	Kitt Peak	Spacewatch	·	1.5 km	MPC · JPL
359398	2010 HT_{106}	—	June 8, 2007	Kitt Peak	Spacewatch	·	730 m	MPC · JPL
359399	2010 JD	—	May 3, 2010	Kitt Peak	Spacewatch	·	630 m	MPC · JPL
359400	2010 JQ_{23}	—	May 4, 2010	WISE	WISE	·	2.7 km	MPC · JPL

== 359401–359500 ==
back to top

Designation			Discovery			Properties		Ref
Permanent	Provisional	Named after	Date	Site	Discoverer(s)	Category	Diam.	Ref
359401	2010 JB_{40}	—	May 6, 2010	Mount Lemmon	Mount Lemmon Survey	·	640 m	MPC · JPL
359402	2010 JN_{43}	—	November 1, 2008	Mount Lemmon	Mount Lemmon Survey	·	820 m	MPC · JPL
359403	2010 JS_{78}	—	August 25, 2004	Kitt Peak	Spacewatch	·	570 m	MPC · JPL
359404	2010 JH_{79}	—	November 7, 2008	Mount Lemmon	Mount Lemmon Survey	·	800 m	MPC · JPL
359405	2010 JK_{79}	—	February 2, 2006	Kitt Peak	Spacewatch	·	910 m	MPC · JPL
359406	2010 JV_{84}	—	September 13, 2007	Mount Lemmon	Mount Lemmon Survey	·	1.7 km	MPC · JPL
359407	2010 JW_{99}	—	January 15, 2008	Mount Lemmon	Mount Lemmon Survey	·	2.7 km	MPC · JPL
359408	2010 JG_{115}	—	May 8, 2010	Mount Lemmon	Mount Lemmon Survey	V	920 m	MPC · JPL
359409	2010 JO_{118}	—	May 11, 2010	Mount Lemmon	Mount Lemmon Survey	·	990 m	MPC · JPL
359410	2010 JS_{121}	—	May 12, 2010	Mount Lemmon	Mount Lemmon Survey	·	670 m	MPC · JPL
359411	2010 KD_{46}	—	October 11, 2005	Anderson Mesa	LONEOS	URS	5.5 km	MPC · JPL
359412	2010 KX_{56}	—	May 20, 2010	WISE	WISE	·	1.6 km	MPC · JPL
359413	2010 KR_{77}	—	May 25, 2010	WISE	WISE	·	3.8 km	MPC · JPL
359414	2010 KQ_{96}	—	May 28, 2010	WISE	WISE	·	2.3 km	MPC · JPL
359415	2010 KU_{114}	—	May 30, 2010	WISE	WISE	·	2.7 km	MPC · JPL
359416	2010 KZ_{121}	—	May 31, 2010	WISE	WISE	(31811) ·	3.7 km	MPC · JPL
359417	2010 LQ_{1}	—	June 4, 2010	Catalina	CSS	·	1.0 km	MPC · JPL
359418	2010 LT_{4}	—	June 1, 2010	WISE	WISE	LIX	4.7 km	MPC · JPL
359419	2010 LL_{8}	—	March 6, 2008	Mount Lemmon	Mount Lemmon Survey	·	3.9 km	MPC · JPL
359420	2010 LF_{10}	—	October 27, 2005	Catalina	CSS	·	4.2 km	MPC · JPL
359421	2010 LF_{16}	—	February 17, 2010	Kitt Peak	Spacewatch	·	820 m	MPC · JPL
359422	2010 LQ_{16}	—	March 17, 2004	Apache Point	SDSS	·	2.4 km	MPC · JPL
359423	2010 LY_{39}	—	June 7, 2010	WISE	WISE	·	2.7 km	MPC · JPL
359424	2010 LU_{43}	—	June 7, 2010	WISE	WISE	·	2.7 km	MPC · JPL
359425	2010 LO_{54}	—	June 9, 2010	WISE	WISE	·	2.2 km	MPC · JPL
359426 Lacks	2010 LA_{71}	Lacks	June 10, 2010	WISE	WISE	VER	2.8 km	MPC · JPL
359427	2010 LD_{82}	—	June 11, 2010	WISE	WISE	·	2.0 km	MPC · JPL
359428	2010 LJ_{86}	—	June 11, 2010	WISE	WISE	VER	3.3 km	MPC · JPL
359429	2010 LA_{88}	—	June 12, 2010	WISE	WISE	·	2.1 km	MPC · JPL
359430	2010 LJ_{115}	—	June 13, 2010	WISE	WISE	·	2.4 km	MPC · JPL
359431	2010 LB_{118}	—	June 14, 2010	WISE	WISE	·	3.7 km	MPC · JPL
359432	2010 MY_{7}	—	June 16, 2010	WISE	WISE	SYL · CYB	5.8 km	MPC · JPL
359433	2010 MO_{33}	—	October 25, 2005	Kitt Peak	Spacewatch	·	4.5 km	MPC · JPL
359434	2010 MJ_{43}	—	June 22, 2010	WISE	WISE	·	3.6 km	MPC · JPL
359435	2010 MK_{48}	—	February 16, 2007	Catalina	CSS	·	5.3 km	MPC · JPL
359436	2010 MT_{56}	—	June 24, 2010	WISE	WISE	EOS	3.1 km	MPC · JPL
359437	2010 MN_{63}	—	June 24, 2010	WISE	WISE	·	2.9 km	MPC · JPL
359438	2010 MA_{66}	—	June 25, 2010	WISE	WISE	·	4.2 km	MPC · JPL
359439	2010 MC_{69}	—	March 8, 2008	Kitt Peak	Spacewatch	·	4.5 km	MPC · JPL
359440	2010 MX_{75}	—	June 26, 2010	WISE	WISE	·	3.9 km	MPC · JPL
359441	2010 MS_{77}	—	June 26, 2010	WISE	WISE	·	2.1 km	MPC · JPL
359442	2010 MG_{86}	—	October 3, 1999	Kitt Peak	Spacewatch	EUP	2.9 km	MPC · JPL
359443	2010 MK_{88}	—	January 24, 2007	Anderson Mesa	LONEOS	T_{j} (2.95)	8.0 km	MPC · JPL
359444	2010 MS_{88}	—	June 24, 2010	Mount Lemmon	Mount Lemmon Survey	·	760 m	MPC · JPL
359445	2010 MH_{96}	—	June 28, 2010	WISE	WISE	·	3.7 km	MPC · JPL
359446	2010 MZ_{97}	—	February 17, 2007	Kitt Peak	Spacewatch	·	3.7 km	MPC · JPL
359447	2010 MZ_{101}	—	June 29, 2010	WISE	WISE	AST	2.8 km	MPC · JPL
359448	2010 MT_{106}	—	August 29, 2005	Kitt Peak	Spacewatch	·	3.2 km	MPC · JPL
359449	2010 NV_{11}	—	July 5, 2010	WISE	WISE	·	4.3 km	MPC · JPL
359450	2010 NQ_{12}	—	September 30, 2006	Mount Lemmon	Mount Lemmon Survey	·	2.2 km	MPC · JPL
359451	2010 NZ_{14}	—	July 5, 2010	WISE	WISE	LUT	5.6 km	MPC · JPL
359452	2010 NR_{24}	—	September 11, 2005	Kitt Peak	Spacewatch	·	4.1 km	MPC · JPL
359453	2010 NK_{29}	—	August 8, 2004	Palomar	NEAT	VER	3.8 km	MPC · JPL
359454	2010 NH_{30}	—	July 7, 2010	WISE	WISE	SYL · CYB	5.2 km	MPC · JPL
359455	2010 NW_{37}	—	July 8, 2010	WISE	WISE	(1118)	4.9 km	MPC · JPL
359456	2010 NG_{42}	—	August 29, 2005	Palomar	NEAT	BRA	2.6 km	MPC · JPL
359457	2010 NE_{45}	—	October 1, 2005	Catalina	CSS	·	3.0 km	MPC · JPL
359458	2010 NE_{49}	—	July 9, 2010	WISE	WISE	·	2.8 km	MPC · JPL
359459	2010 NJ_{49}	—	October 27, 2005	Kitt Peak	Spacewatch	·	4.2 km	MPC · JPL
359460	2010 NJ_{51}	—	July 10, 2010	WISE	WISE	·	3.2 km	MPC · JPL
359461	2010 NS_{53}	—	September 9, 2004	Kitt Peak	Spacewatch	·	4.5 km	MPC · JPL
359462	2010 NA_{55}	—	July 10, 2010	WISE	WISE	BAR	2.2 km	MPC · JPL
359463	2010 NG_{56}	—	September 19, 2001	Socorro	LINEAR	ADE	4.3 km	MPC · JPL
359464	2010 NG_{61}	—	July 11, 2010	WISE	WISE	CYB	4.9 km	MPC · JPL
359465	2010 NX_{61}	—	June 21, 2009	Mount Lemmon	Mount Lemmon Survey	·	5.4 km	MPC · JPL
359466	2010 NB_{62}	—	July 11, 2010	WISE	WISE	ADE	2.5 km	MPC · JPL
359467	2010 NF_{64}	—	July 11, 2010	WISE	WISE	·	4.0 km	MPC · JPL
359468	2010 NH_{70}	—	August 8, 2004	Palomar	NEAT	·	4.8 km	MPC · JPL
359469	2010 NH_{75}	—	July 15, 2010	WISE	WISE	T_{j} (2.99) · EUP	6.4 km	MPC · JPL
359470	2010 NE_{80}	—	July 15, 2010	WISE	WISE	·	5.5 km	MPC · JPL
359471	2010 ND_{99}	—	April 8, 2008	Kitt Peak	Spacewatch	·	3.8 km	MPC · JPL
359472	2010 NZ_{114}	—	July 14, 2010	WISE	WISE	·	3.9 km	MPC · JPL
359473	2010 NZ_{117}	—	July 14, 2010	La Sagra	OAM	·	1.5 km	MPC · JPL
359474 Robertwilliams	2010 OQ_{4}	Robertwilliams	August 12, 2004	Cerro Tololo	Deep Ecliptic Survey	·	4.5 km	MPC · JPL
359475	2010 OO_{10}	—	October 23, 2005	Catalina	CSS	·	3.1 km	MPC · JPL
359476	2010 OT_{13}	—	July 17, 2010	WISE	WISE	·	2.5 km	MPC · JPL
359477	2010 OK_{15}	—	March 5, 2008	Kitt Peak	Spacewatch	·	4.1 km	MPC · JPL
359478	2010 OE_{17}	—	May 2, 2003	Kitt Peak	Spacewatch	·	4.2 km	MPC · JPL
359479	2010 OH_{20}	—	January 27, 2007	Mount Lemmon	Mount Lemmon Survey	URS	4.7 km	MPC · JPL
359480	2010 OY_{26}	—	October 21, 2001	Socorro	LINEAR	·	3.0 km	MPC · JPL
359481	2010 OT_{29}	—	October 22, 2005	Kitt Peak	Spacewatch	·	4.0 km	MPC · JPL
359482	2010 OC_{31}	—	July 20, 2010	WISE	WISE	·	3.7 km	MPC · JPL
359483	2010 OX_{33}	—	September 10, 2004	Kitt Peak	Spacewatch	·	3.1 km	MPC · JPL
359484	2010 OR_{34}	—	October 10, 2004	Kitt Peak	Spacewatch	·	3.9 km	MPC · JPL
359485	2010 OO_{37}	—	June 21, 2005	Palomar	NEAT	·	4.2 km	MPC · JPL
359486	2010 OB_{39}	—	February 27, 2009	Mount Lemmon	Mount Lemmon Survey	·	2.1 km	MPC · JPL
359487	2010 OM_{43}	—	November 25, 2005	Catalina	CSS	·	5.2 km	MPC · JPL
359488	2010 OL_{53}	—	August 8, 2005	Siding Spring	SSS	·	3.7 km	MPC · JPL
359489	2010 ON_{59}	—	February 16, 2007	Catalina	CSS	·	5.5 km	MPC · JPL
359490	2010 OK_{72}	—	April 22, 2009	Mount Lemmon	Mount Lemmon Survey	·	3.6 km	MPC · JPL
359491	2010 OL_{81}	—	February 6, 2007	Kitt Peak	Spacewatch	VER	4.0 km	MPC · JPL
359492	2010 OR_{82}	—	October 25, 2005	Mount Lemmon	Mount Lemmon Survey	·	4.7 km	MPC · JPL
359493	2010 OD_{96}	—	December 25, 2001	Kitt Peak	Spacewatch	·	4.5 km	MPC · JPL
359494	2010 OP_{99}	—	January 10, 2007	Kitt Peak	Spacewatch	·	5.0 km	MPC · JPL
359495	2010 OY_{107}	—	August 18, 2004	Siding Spring	SSS	·	5.6 km	MPC · JPL
359496	2010 OA_{118}	—	January 9, 2007	Mount Lemmon	Mount Lemmon Survey	·	3.2 km	MPC · JPL
359497	2010 OJ_{127}	—	June 30, 2005	Palomar	NEAT	·	2.7 km	MPC · JPL
359498	2010 PK_{61}	—	April 11, 2005	Mount Lemmon	Mount Lemmon Survey	·	1.4 km	MPC · JPL
359499	2010 PJ_{66}	—	February 5, 2009	Mount Lemmon	Mount Lemmon Survey	·	1.5 km	MPC · JPL
359500	2010 PA_{74}	—	February 9, 2008	Kitt Peak	Spacewatch	·	3.2 km	MPC · JPL

== 359501–359600 ==
back to top

Designation			Discovery			Properties		Ref
Permanent	Provisional	Named after	Date	Site	Discoverer(s)	Category	Diam.	Ref
359501	2010 PE_{78}	—	March 2, 2001	Kitt Peak	Spacewatch	(1118)	4.4 km	MPC · JPL
359502	2010 PV_{78}	—	August 5, 2010	Great Shefford	Birtwhistle, P.	EOS	2.3 km	MPC · JPL
359503	2010 PQ_{80}	—	September 22, 2003	Palomar	NEAT	V	910 m	MPC · JPL
359504	2010 QM	—	August 16, 2010	La Sagra	OAM	MAS	1.0 km	MPC · JPL
359505	2010 QD_{5}	—	September 14, 1999	Catalina	CSS	TIR	3.0 km	MPC · JPL
359506	2010 RV_{7}	—	March 4, 2001	Kitt Peak	Spacewatch	·	1.0 km	MPC · JPL
359507	2010 RP_{10}	—	July 20, 2001	Palomar	NEAT	·	1.9 km	MPC · JPL
359508	2010 RJ_{12}	—	September 1, 2010	Socorro	LINEAR	·	2.9 km	MPC · JPL
359509	2010 RA_{14}	—	September 17, 2006	Kitt Peak	Spacewatch	·	1.6 km	MPC · JPL
359510	2010 RX_{43}	—	September 23, 1997	Kitt Peak	Spacewatch	CYB	4.5 km	MPC · JPL
359511	2010 RV_{46}	—	September 25, 2005	Kitt Peak	Spacewatch	·	2.2 km	MPC · JPL
359512	2010 RF_{48}	—	April 30, 2003	Kitt Peak	Spacewatch	·	2.3 km	MPC · JPL
359513	2010 RG_{49}	—	July 8, 2005	Kitt Peak	Spacewatch	·	2.1 km	MPC · JPL
359514	2010 RD_{51}	—	April 13, 2008	Mount Lemmon	Mount Lemmon Survey	·	3.1 km	MPC · JPL
359515	2010 RN_{51}	—	March 10, 2004	Palomar	NEAT	EUN	1.7 km	MPC · JPL
359516	2010 RM_{54}	—	November 28, 1994	Kitt Peak	Spacewatch	·	2.7 km	MPC · JPL
359517	2010 RK_{59}	—	October 2, 2006	Mount Lemmon	Mount Lemmon Survey	·	2.4 km	MPC · JPL
359518	2010 RV_{59}	—	January 26, 2007	Kitt Peak	Spacewatch	·	2.8 km	MPC · JPL
359519	2010 RK_{62}	—	July 29, 2001	Palomar	NEAT	·	1.9 km	MPC · JPL
359520	2010 RX_{63}	—	April 3, 2003	Anderson Mesa	LONEOS	EOS	2.5 km	MPC · JPL
359521	2010 RV_{65}	—	July 2, 2005	Kitt Peak	Spacewatch	·	2.2 km	MPC · JPL
359522	2010 RR_{75}	—	August 24, 2001	Kitt Peak	Spacewatch	PAD	1.5 km	MPC · JPL
359523	2010 RT_{78}	—	September 2, 2010	Mount Lemmon	Mount Lemmon Survey	·	3.7 km	MPC · JPL
359524	2010 RW_{83}	—	February 1, 2008	Mount Lemmon	Mount Lemmon Survey	·	3.2 km	MPC · JPL
359525	2010 RF_{88}	—	September 23, 2005	Kitt Peak	Spacewatch	EOS	2.2 km	MPC · JPL
359526	2010 RG_{90}	—	August 12, 2010	Kitt Peak	Spacewatch	·	3.5 km	MPC · JPL
359527	2010 RL_{93}	—	August 29, 2005	Palomar	NEAT	·	2.6 km	MPC · JPL
359528	2010 RZ_{101}	—	April 24, 2003	Kitt Peak	Spacewatch	·	2.4 km	MPC · JPL
359529	2010 RT_{102}	—	October 28, 2005	Kitt Peak	Spacewatch	·	2.6 km	MPC · JPL
359530	2010 RD_{107}	—	March 31, 2008	Mount Lemmon	Mount Lemmon Survey	·	4.2 km	MPC · JPL
359531	2010 RV_{107}	—	September 29, 2005	Mount Lemmon	Mount Lemmon Survey	KOR	1.5 km	MPC · JPL
359532	2010 RC_{108}	—	April 4, 2008	Kitt Peak	Spacewatch	·	2.9 km	MPC · JPL
359533	2010 RQ_{112}	—	October 6, 2005	Mount Lemmon	Mount Lemmon Survey	·	2.2 km	MPC · JPL
359534	2010 RS_{113}	—	March 1, 2008	Kitt Peak	Spacewatch	EOS	2.0 km	MPC · JPL
359535	2010 RC_{116}	—	October 20, 2006	Kitt Peak	Spacewatch	·	1.5 km	MPC · JPL
359536	2010 RK_{125}	—	August 30, 2005	Kitt Peak	Spacewatch	·	2.1 km	MPC · JPL
359537	2010 RX_{131}	—	September 13, 2005	Kitt Peak	Spacewatch	KOR	1.4 km	MPC · JPL
359538	2010 RF_{137}	—	September 18, 1995	Kitt Peak	Spacewatch	·	2.2 km	MPC · JPL
359539	2010 RB_{143}	—	September 18, 2001	Kitt Peak	Spacewatch	EUN	1.3 km	MPC · JPL
359540	2010 RX_{144}	—	October 29, 2005	Kitt Peak	Spacewatch	·	3.6 km	MPC · JPL
359541	2010 RU_{158}	—	February 14, 1999	Kitt Peak	Spacewatch	·	2.4 km	MPC · JPL
359542	2010 RM_{162}	—	March 5, 2008	Kitt Peak	Spacewatch	EOS	2.2 km	MPC · JPL
359543	2010 RD_{165}	—	September 9, 2010	Kitt Peak	Spacewatch	·	740 m	MPC · JPL
359544	2010 RG_{179}	—	January 20, 2008	Mount Lemmon	Mount Lemmon Survey	·	2.3 km	MPC · JPL
359545	2010 RS_{179}	—	September 4, 2010	Kitt Peak	Spacewatch	·	3.6 km	MPC · JPL
359546	2010 ST_{4}	—	February 8, 2007	Kitt Peak	Spacewatch	·	3.9 km	MPC · JPL
359547	2010 SG_{5}	—	November 22, 2006	Mount Lemmon	Mount Lemmon Survey	·	1.6 km	MPC · JPL
359548	2010 SU_{17}	—	May 10, 2005	Mount Lemmon	Mount Lemmon Survey	·	1.3 km	MPC · JPL
359549	2010 SO_{22}	—	September 13, 2005	Kitt Peak	Spacewatch	KOR	1.4 km	MPC · JPL
359550	2010 SG_{23}	—	December 30, 2000	Kitt Peak	Spacewatch	VER	3.6 km	MPC · JPL
359551	2010 SJ_{23}	—	October 29, 2005	Catalina	CSS	EOS	2.4 km	MPC · JPL
359552	2010 SF_{28}	—	April 7, 2008	Mount Lemmon	Mount Lemmon Survey	EOS	1.9 km	MPC · JPL
359553	2010 SP_{31}	—	March 2, 2008	Kitt Peak	Spacewatch	EOS	2.4 km	MPC · JPL
359554	2010 ST_{37}	—	October 31, 2005	Kitt Peak	Spacewatch	·	3.4 km	MPC · JPL
359555	2010 SU_{37}	—	September 16, 2006	Catalina	CSS	·	2.0 km	MPC · JPL
359556	2010 SW_{38}	—	September 17, 2010	Mount Lemmon	Mount Lemmon Survey	·	3.6 km	MPC · JPL
359557	2010 SW_{40}	—	September 5, 1999	Catalina	CSS	·	3.6 km	MPC · JPL
359558	2010 SC_{42}	—	July 20, 1999	Kitt Peak	Spacewatch	EOS	2.0 km	MPC · JPL
359559	2010 TG_{5}	—	October 26, 2005	Anderson Mesa	LONEOS	·	3.5 km	MPC · JPL
359560	2010 TD_{33}	—	November 4, 1999	Kitt Peak	Spacewatch	·	2.2 km	MPC · JPL
359561	2010 TF_{33}	—	February 27, 2009	Mount Lemmon	Mount Lemmon Survey	·	2.0 km	MPC · JPL
359562	2010 TU_{86}	—	November 15, 2006	Catalina	CSS	·	2.8 km	MPC · JPL
359563	2010 TN_{91}	—	March 29, 2008	Mount Lemmon	Mount Lemmon Survey	KOR	1.3 km	MPC · JPL
359564	2010 TW_{100}	—	August 19, 2001	Cerro Tololo	Deep Ecliptic Survey	MIS	2.6 km	MPC · JPL
359565	2010 TY_{104}	—	August 31, 2005	Kitt Peak	Spacewatch	·	2.1 km	MPC · JPL
359566	2010 TC_{106}	—	August 28, 2005	Kitt Peak	Spacewatch	·	2.1 km	MPC · JPL
359567	2010 TT_{116}	—	May 18, 2004	Campo Imperatore	CINEOS	·	2.7 km	MPC · JPL
359568	2010 TX_{119}	—	August 23, 2004	Kitt Peak	Spacewatch	·	3.2 km	MPC · JPL
359569	2010 TD_{121}	—	October 2, 2005	Mount Lemmon	Mount Lemmon Survey	·	1.7 km	MPC · JPL
359570	2010 TU_{126}	—	November 26, 2005	Mount Lemmon	Mount Lemmon Survey	·	2.9 km	MPC · JPL
359571	2010 TP_{128}	—	October 9, 2010	Catalina	CSS	EOS	3.1 km	MPC · JPL
359572	2010 TZ_{152}	—	August 28, 2005	Kitt Peak	Spacewatch	·	2.1 km	MPC · JPL
359573	2010 TJ_{153}	—	August 22, 2004	Kitt Peak	Spacewatch	EOS	2.5 km	MPC · JPL
359574	2010 TT_{160}	—	November 1, 2006	Mount Lemmon	Mount Lemmon Survey	·	2.3 km	MPC · JPL
359575	2010 TF_{162}	—	February 7, 2000	Kitt Peak	Spacewatch	·	1.4 km	MPC · JPL
359576	2010 TR_{163}	—	January 27, 2007	Kitt Peak	Spacewatch	EOS	2.3 km	MPC · JPL
359577	2010 TY_{174}	—	September 28, 2006	Catalina	CSS	·	2.4 km	MPC · JPL
359578	2010 TR_{184}	—	September 7, 2004	Kitt Peak	Spacewatch	·	3.9 km	MPC · JPL
359579	2010 TM_{187}	—	August 23, 2004	Kitt Peak	Spacewatch	·	3.0 km	MPC · JPL
359580	2010 TE_{188}	—	April 4, 2003	Kitt Peak	Spacewatch	·	2.7 km	MPC · JPL
359581	2010 UA_{16}	—	October 17, 2010	Mount Lemmon	Mount Lemmon Survey	EOS	2.4 km	MPC · JPL
359582	2010 UX_{20}	—	September 30, 2005	Mount Lemmon	Mount Lemmon Survey	NAE	2.5 km	MPC · JPL
359583	2010 UQ_{41}	—	November 5, 1994	Kitt Peak	Spacewatch	·	3.3 km	MPC · JPL
359584	2010 UA_{46}	—	June 4, 2003	Kitt Peak	Spacewatch	·	5.6 km	MPC · JPL
359585	2010 UA_{47}	—	August 29, 2009	Kitt Peak	Spacewatch	L4	8.4 km	MPC · JPL
359586	2010 UA_{53}	—	September 30, 1999	Kitt Peak	Spacewatch	·	4.1 km	MPC · JPL
359587	2010 UN_{62}	—	August 31, 2005	Palomar	NEAT	GAL	1.7 km	MPC · JPL
359588	2010 UE_{85}	—	September 15, 2004	Kitt Peak	Spacewatch	·	3.4 km	MPC · JPL
359589	2010 UB_{95}	—	October 5, 2004	Anderson Mesa	LONEOS	VER	3.9 km	MPC · JPL
359590	2010 UA_{98}	—	September 3, 2010	Mount Lemmon	Mount Lemmon Survey	EOS	2.6 km	MPC · JPL
359591	2010 UT_{107}	—	October 5, 2004	Palomar	NEAT	VER	3.3 km	MPC · JPL
359592	2010 VA_{1}	—	November 2, 2010	Mount Lemmon	Mount Lemmon Survey	AMO	350 m	MPC · JPL
359593	2010 VD_{59}	—	December 27, 2006	Mount Lemmon	Mount Lemmon Survey	·	3.9 km	MPC · JPL
359594	2010 VF_{86}	—	September 17, 2009	Kitt Peak	Spacewatch	L4 · ERY	7.9 km	MPC · JPL
359595	2010 VJ_{104}	—	October 7, 2004	Socorro	LINEAR	·	4.4 km	MPC · JPL
359596	2010 VW_{116}	—	March 26, 2008	Mount Lemmon	Mount Lemmon Survey	·	2.1 km	MPC · JPL
359597	2010 VN_{131}	—	August 20, 2004	Kitt Peak	Spacewatch	·	2.7 km	MPC · JPL
359598	2010 VT_{152}	—	April 30, 2003	Kitt Peak	Spacewatch	L4	8.3 km	MPC · JPL
359599	2010 VG_{164}	—	December 1, 2006	Kitt Peak	Spacewatch	·	1.7 km	MPC · JPL
359600	2010 VU_{194}	—	September 8, 2004	Socorro	LINEAR	·	2.9 km	MPC · JPL

== 359601–359700 ==
back to top

Designation			Discovery			Properties		Ref
Permanent	Provisional	Named after	Date	Site	Discoverer(s)	Category	Diam.	Ref
359601	2010 VF_{207}	—	May 10, 2002	Palomar	NEAT	·	4.6 km	MPC · JPL
359602	2010 VX_{210}	—	March 13, 2002	Socorro	LINEAR	TIR	3.7 km	MPC · JPL
359603	2010 WU_{5}	—	September 20, 2009	Kitt Peak	Spacewatch	L4	8.0 km	MPC · JPL
359604	2010 WZ_{9}	—	September 23, 2009	Kitt Peak	Spacewatch	L4	7.2 km	MPC · JPL
359605	2010 WG_{13}	—	June 9, 2007	Siding Spring	SSS	3:2	9.1 km	MPC · JPL
359606	2010 WV_{63}	—	November 1, 2010	Kitt Peak	Spacewatch	L4	8.3 km	MPC · JPL
359607	2010 WD_{64}	—	January 3, 2000	Kitt Peak	Spacewatch	L4	8.6 km	MPC · JPL
359608	2010 WQ_{72}	—	October 23, 2009	Kitt Peak	Spacewatch	3:2	6.1 km	MPC · JPL
359609	2010 WP_{74}	—	April 11, 2002	Socorro	LINEAR	·	3.8 km	MPC · JPL
359610	2010 XG_{39}	—	October 6, 2008	Mount Lemmon	Mount Lemmon Survey	L4	5.4 km	MPC · JPL
359611	2010 XP_{88}	—	October 22, 2006	Mount Lemmon	Mount Lemmon Survey	·	1.5 km	MPC · JPL
359612	2011 BK_{78}	—	August 8, 2004	Socorro	LINEAR	·	3.7 km	MPC · JPL
359613	2011 BH_{153}	—	February 17, 2007	Kitt Peak	Spacewatch	·	3.2 km	MPC · JPL
359614	2011 GK_{3}	—	December 14, 2010	Mount Lemmon	Mount Lemmon Survey	L4	10 km	MPC · JPL
359615	2011 JR_{3}	—	September 30, 2006	Siding Spring	SSS	H	730 m	MPC · JPL
359616	2011 JA_{11}	—	May 8, 2011	Mount Lemmon	Mount Lemmon Survey	L5	10 km	MPC · JPL
359617	2011 OQ_{13}	—	February 19, 2009	Mount Lemmon	Mount Lemmon Survey	·	1.3 km	MPC · JPL
359618	2011 OY_{18}	—	January 8, 2010	Mount Lemmon	Mount Lemmon Survey	H	800 m	MPC · JPL
359619	2011 OC_{23}	—	July 25, 2003	Palomar	NEAT	·	1.1 km	MPC · JPL
359620	2011 OR_{49}	—	September 22, 2003	Haleakala	NEAT	·	1.6 km	MPC · JPL
359621	2011 OS_{59}	—	November 20, 2003	Kitt Peak	Deep Ecliptic Survey	·	2.3 km	MPC · JPL
359622	2011 PZ_{8}	—	September 24, 2008	Kitt Peak	Spacewatch	·	820 m	MPC · JPL
359623	2011 QW_{9}	—	September 23, 2008	Catalina	CSS	·	810 m	MPC · JPL
359624	2011 QR_{12}	—	January 7, 2010	Catalina	CSS	H	830 m	MPC · JPL
359625	2011 QU_{13}	—	September 12, 2007	Catalina	CSS	·	1.7 km	MPC · JPL
359626	2011 QL_{16}	—	December 16, 1998	Xinglong	SCAP	·	2.3 km	MPC · JPL
359627	2011 QP_{18}	—	October 9, 2004	Anderson Mesa	LONEOS	V	760 m	MPC · JPL
359628	2011 QW_{19}	—	January 20, 2009	Mount Lemmon	Mount Lemmon Survey	·	1.2 km	MPC · JPL
359629	2011 QX_{20}	—	December 21, 2008	Mount Lemmon	Mount Lemmon Survey	·	900 m	MPC · JPL
359630	2011 QY_{28}	—	September 18, 2007	Kitt Peak	Spacewatch	·	1.1 km	MPC · JPL
359631	2011 QU_{42}	—	September 28, 1997	Kitt Peak	Spacewatch	·	1.1 km	MPC · JPL
359632	2011 QK_{47}	—	March 13, 2010	Mount Lemmon	Mount Lemmon Survey	·	760 m	MPC · JPL
359633	2011 QB_{49}	—	June 27, 2011	Mount Lemmon	Mount Lemmon Survey	·	1.4 km	MPC · JPL
359634	2011 QX_{60}	—	September 7, 2008	Mount Lemmon	Mount Lemmon Survey	·	720 m	MPC · JPL
359635	2011 QB_{61}	—	February 1, 2006	Mount Lemmon	Mount Lemmon Survey	·	1.1 km	MPC · JPL
359636	2011 QM_{62}	—	December 29, 2005	Socorro	LINEAR	·	810 m	MPC · JPL
359637	2011 QP_{66}	—	June 13, 2011	Mount Lemmon	Mount Lemmon Survey	·	1.6 km	MPC · JPL
359638	2011 QO_{67}	—	October 30, 2008	Mount Lemmon	Mount Lemmon Survey	·	830 m	MPC · JPL
359639	2011 QD_{68}	—	April 25, 2007	Kitt Peak	Spacewatch	·	950 m	MPC · JPL
359640	2011 QF_{70}	—	August 24, 2011	La Sagra	OAM	H	770 m	MPC · JPL
359641	2011 QU_{72}	—	September 10, 2004	Socorro	LINEAR	·	810 m	MPC · JPL
359642	2011 QV_{91}	—	March 20, 1999	Apache Point	SDSS	·	840 m	MPC · JPL
359643	2011 RD_{2}	—	October 5, 2004	Kitt Peak	Spacewatch	·	870 m	MPC · JPL
359644	2011 RO_{11}	—	November 21, 2000	Socorro	LINEAR	NYS	1.4 km	MPC · JPL
359645	2011 RQ_{12}	—	March 29, 2000	Kitt Peak	Spacewatch	·	870 m	MPC · JPL
359646	2011 RF_{13}	—	January 16, 2009	Mount Lemmon	Mount Lemmon Survey	·	980 m	MPC · JPL
359647	2011 RJ_{18}	—	September 24, 2008	Mount Lemmon	Mount Lemmon Survey	·	670 m	MPC · JPL
359648	2011 SQ	—	December 18, 2003	Kitt Peak	Spacewatch	·	1.4 km	MPC · JPL
359649	2011 SN_{3}	—	September 18, 2004	Socorro	LINEAR	·	1.1 km	MPC · JPL
359650	2011 ST_{4}	—	November 2, 2004	Anderson Mesa	LONEOS	·	1.2 km	MPC · JPL
359651	2011 SU_{4}	—	October 4, 2004	Kitt Peak	Spacewatch	V	620 m	MPC · JPL
359652	2011 SM_{11}	—	September 23, 2000	Socorro	LINEAR	V	740 m	MPC · JPL
359653	2011 ST_{28}	—	September 24, 1960	Palomar	C. J. van Houten, I. van Houten-Groeneveld, T. Gehrels	·	2.2 km	MPC · JPL
359654	2011 SO_{35}	—	February 9, 2006	Palomar	NEAT	V	780 m	MPC · JPL
359655	2011 SR_{35}	—	September 12, 1998	Kitt Peak	Spacewatch	·	850 m	MPC · JPL
359656	2011 SA_{36}	—	March 12, 2008	Kitt Peak	Spacewatch	·	3.3 km	MPC · JPL
359657	2011 ST_{49}	—	December 6, 2005	Mount Lemmon	Mount Lemmon Survey	·	840 m	MPC · JPL
359658	2011 SV_{53}	—	October 29, 2003	Kitt Peak	Spacewatch	·	850 m	MPC · JPL
359659	2011 SP_{54}	—	September 22, 2008	Mount Lemmon	Mount Lemmon Survey	·	810 m	MPC · JPL
359660	2011 SV_{63}	—	December 5, 2008	Mount Lemmon	Mount Lemmon Survey	·	1.5 km	MPC · JPL
359661	2011 SO_{67}	—	August 13, 2007	Socorro	LINEAR	·	1.5 km	MPC · JPL
359662	2011 SQ_{76}	—	November 4, 1996	Kitt Peak	Spacewatch	V	890 m	MPC · JPL
359663	2011 SW_{82}	—	September 20, 2011	Mount Lemmon	Mount Lemmon Survey	·	3.8 km	MPC · JPL
359664	2011 SW_{87}	—	September 22, 2003	Palomar	NEAT	·	1.0 km	MPC · JPL
359665	2011 SF_{88}	—	March 12, 2005	Kitt Peak	Spacewatch	ADE	1.9 km	MPC · JPL
359666	2011 SN_{91}	—	March 3, 2009	Kitt Peak	Spacewatch	·	1.7 km	MPC · JPL
359667	2011 SU_{92}	—	December 22, 2003	Kitt Peak	Spacewatch	·	1.4 km	MPC · JPL
359668	2011 SW_{104}	—	March 11, 2005	Mount Lemmon	Mount Lemmon Survey	MAR	870 m	MPC · JPL
359669	2011 SP_{105}	—	December 15, 2007	Mount Lemmon	Mount Lemmon Survey	·	1.8 km	MPC · JPL
359670	2011 SJ_{106}	—	December 17, 2001	Socorro	LINEAR	EOS	2.5 km	MPC · JPL
359671	2011 SO_{107}	—	November 27, 2000	Kitt Peak	Spacewatch	MAS	900 m	MPC · JPL
359672	2011 SQ_{107}	—	October 19, 2007	Catalina	CSS	·	1.5 km	MPC · JPL
359673	2011 SL_{114}	—	March 24, 2006	Kitt Peak	Spacewatch	·	1.7 km	MPC · JPL
359674	2011 SL_{115}	—	March 21, 2009	Mount Lemmon	Mount Lemmon Survey	·	2.0 km	MPC · JPL
359675	2011 SE_{117}	—	April 6, 2008	Mount Lemmon	Mount Lemmon Survey	TIR	3.3 km	MPC · JPL
359676	2011 SJ_{119}	—	September 24, 2000	Socorro	LINEAR	·	1.5 km	MPC · JPL
359677	2011 SA_{123}	—	October 16, 2001	Socorro	LINEAR	·	960 m	MPC · JPL
359678	2011 ST_{125}	—	March 21, 2009	Mount Lemmon	Mount Lemmon Survey	AGN	1.2 km	MPC · JPL
359679	2011 SX_{128}	—	November 1, 2008	Mount Lemmon	Mount Lemmon Survey	·	670 m	MPC · JPL
359680	2011 SY_{132}	—	April 2, 2009	Kitt Peak	Spacewatch	·	1.7 km	MPC · JPL
359681	2011 SJ_{142}	—	September 8, 2007	Mount Lemmon	Mount Lemmon Survey	·	1.0 km	MPC · JPL
359682	2011 SE_{144}	—	January 20, 2009	Mount Lemmon	Mount Lemmon Survey	·	1.1 km	MPC · JPL
359683	2011 SK_{144}	—	April 9, 2010	Kitt Peak	Spacewatch	·	1.5 km	MPC · JPL
359684	2011 SC_{154}	—	November 30, 2003	Kitt Peak	Spacewatch	·	1.1 km	MPC · JPL
359685	2011 SN_{163}	—	August 23, 2004	Kitt Peak	Spacewatch	·	640 m	MPC · JPL
359686	2011 SR_{163}	—	February 4, 2000	Kitt Peak	Spacewatch	·	600 m	MPC · JPL
359687	2011 SW_{171}	—	August 19, 2006	Kitt Peak	Spacewatch	·	1.5 km	MPC · JPL
359688	2011 SH_{172}	—	December 14, 2007	Mount Lemmon	Mount Lemmon Survey	·	1.7 km	MPC · JPL
359689	2011 SY_{172}	—	September 16, 2010	Mount Lemmon	Mount Lemmon Survey	EOS	2.6 km	MPC · JPL
359690	2011 SN_{179}	—	August 21, 2006	Kitt Peak	Spacewatch	AGN	1.1 km	MPC · JPL
359691	2011 SQ_{182}	—	September 18, 2006	Kitt Peak	Spacewatch	BRA	1.5 km	MPC · JPL
359692	2011 SB_{183}	—	December 18, 2007	Kitt Peak	Spacewatch	·	1.7 km	MPC · JPL
359693	2011 SL_{184}	—	September 9, 2002	Campo Imperatore	CINEOS	·	1.9 km	MPC · JPL
359694	2011 SC_{185}	—	November 26, 2003	Kitt Peak	Spacewatch	·	1.1 km	MPC · JPL
359695	2011 ST_{205}	—	April 10, 2003	Kitt Peak	Spacewatch	·	980 m	MPC · JPL
359696	2011 SD_{210}	—	February 1, 2009	Kitt Peak	Spacewatch	·	1.8 km	MPC · JPL
359697	2011 SX_{211}	—	December 29, 2008	Kitt Peak	Spacewatch	·	1.0 km	MPC · JPL
359698	2011 SG_{215}	—	March 21, 2002	Kitt Peak	Spacewatch	·	1.3 km	MPC · JPL
359699	2011 SX_{218}	—	September 9, 2004	Socorro	LINEAR	·	840 m	MPC · JPL
359700	2011 SX_{222}	—	October 10, 2007	Catalina	CSS	·	2.1 km	MPC · JPL

== 359701–359800 ==
back to top

Designation			Discovery			Properties		Ref
Permanent	Provisional	Named after	Date	Site	Discoverer(s)	Category	Diam.	Ref
359701	2011 SS_{228}	—	July 8, 2004	Siding Spring	SSS	·	860 m	MPC · JPL
359702	2011 SB_{233}	—	November 8, 2007	Catalina	CSS	KON	3.1 km	MPC · JPL
359703	2011 SB_{249}	—	November 16, 2006	Kitt Peak	Spacewatch	THM	2.1 km	MPC · JPL
359704	2011 SP_{249}	—	December 5, 2002	Socorro	LINEAR	·	2.3 km	MPC · JPL
359705	2011 SX_{250}	—	December 21, 2006	Kitt Peak	Spacewatch	·	3.5 km	MPC · JPL
359706	2011 SL_{257}	—	February 25, 2006	Kitt Peak	Spacewatch	·	760 m	MPC · JPL
359707	2011 SU_{272}	—	October 3, 2002	Palomar	NEAT	·	2.2 km	MPC · JPL
359708	2011 SP_{274}	—	September 19, 2001	Socorro	LINEAR	·	860 m	MPC · JPL
359709	2011 TS_{3}	—	November 2, 2006	Mount Lemmon	Mount Lemmon Survey	·	1.9 km	MPC · JPL
359710	2011 TE_{4}	—	December 24, 2005	Kitt Peak	Spacewatch	·	660 m	MPC · JPL
359711	2011 TX_{5}	—	December 13, 2006	Catalina	CSS	·	2.4 km	MPC · JPL
359712	2011 TJ_{8}	—	September 8, 2008	Siding Spring	SSS	H	780 m	MPC · JPL
359713	2011 TV_{9}	—	September 16, 2004	Kitt Peak	Spacewatch	·	1.4 km	MPC · JPL
359714	2011 TT_{11}	—	January 15, 1996	Kitt Peak	Spacewatch	·	780 m	MPC · JPL
359715	2011 TD_{16}	—	March 18, 2009	Kitt Peak	Spacewatch	·	2.1 km	MPC · JPL
359716	2011 TE_{16}	—	September 29, 2005	Kitt Peak	Spacewatch	·	3.1 km	MPC · JPL
359717	2011 UO_{1}	—	February 13, 2008	Catalina	CSS	·	4.5 km	MPC · JPL
359718	2011 UD_{3}	—	September 15, 2002	Palomar	NEAT	·	1.7 km	MPC · JPL
359719	2011 UV_{5}	—	April 2, 2005	Mount Lemmon	Mount Lemmon Survey	·	1.6 km	MPC · JPL
359720	2011 UN_{6}	—	November 11, 2004	Kitt Peak	Spacewatch	·	1.6 km	MPC · JPL
359721	2011 UK_{9}	—	March 27, 2004	Catalina	CSS	·	2.2 km	MPC · JPL
359722	2011 UG_{12}	—	April 9, 2010	Mount Lemmon	Mount Lemmon Survey	·	2.5 km	MPC · JPL
359723	2011 UL_{13}	—	December 19, 2007	Mount Lemmon	Mount Lemmon Survey	(13314)	2.3 km	MPC · JPL
359724	2011 UH_{24}	—	July 18, 2007	La Sagra	OAM	·	1.6 km	MPC · JPL
359725	2011 UE_{25}	—	December 5, 2007	Kitt Peak	Spacewatch	AGN	1.2 km	MPC · JPL
359726	2011 UD_{28}	—	September 19, 2006	Catalina	CSS	·	2.2 km	MPC · JPL
359727	2011 UU_{28}	—	April 1, 2009	Kitt Peak	Spacewatch	EUN	3.3 km	MPC · JPL
359728	2011 UT_{29}	—	March 3, 2000	Socorro	LINEAR	·	860 m	MPC · JPL
359729	2011 UQ_{30}	—	October 7, 2005	Mount Lemmon	Mount Lemmon Survey	·	4.0 km	MPC · JPL
359730	2011 UA_{31}	—	December 31, 2007	Kitt Peak	Spacewatch	(21344)	1.7 km	MPC · JPL
359731	2011 UY_{36}	—	June 18, 2010	Mount Lemmon	Mount Lemmon Survey	·	1.7 km	MPC · JPL
359732	2011 UG_{37}	—	December 18, 2007	Mount Lemmon	Mount Lemmon Survey	HOF	2.9 km	MPC · JPL
359733	2011 UY_{37}	—	June 1, 2010	Nogales	M. Schwartz, P. R. Holvorcem	·	1.1 km	MPC · JPL
359734	2011 UU_{39}	—	October 1, 1998	Kitt Peak	Spacewatch	·	1.4 km	MPC · JPL
359735	2011 UP_{45}	—	April 11, 2002	Palomar	NEAT	PHO	960 m	MPC · JPL
359736	2011 UJ_{49}	—	April 11, 2005	Mount Lemmon	Mount Lemmon Survey	·	1.9 km	MPC · JPL
359737	2011 UR_{50}	—	November 4, 2002	Palomar	NEAT	·	1.8 km	MPC · JPL
359738	2011 UU_{50}	—	January 16, 2004	Palomar	NEAT	·	3.0 km	MPC · JPL
359739	2011 UN_{51}	—	April 20, 2009	Mount Lemmon	Mount Lemmon Survey	·	1.5 km	MPC · JPL
359740	2011 UR_{51}	—	April 6, 2005	Mount Lemmon	Mount Lemmon Survey	·	1.6 km	MPC · JPL
359741	2011 UE_{54}	—	May 30, 2010	WISE	WISE	·	3.7 km	MPC · JPL
359742	2011 UN_{56}	—	March 16, 2004	Kitt Peak	Spacewatch	·	2.3 km	MPC · JPL
359743	2011 UA_{58}	—	May 7, 2010	Mount Lemmon	Mount Lemmon Survey	·	730 m	MPC · JPL
359744	2011 UN_{61}	—	November 5, 2007	Mount Lemmon	Mount Lemmon Survey	·	1.5 km	MPC · JPL
359745	2011 UM_{70}	—	October 11, 2004	Kitt Peak	Spacewatch	V	710 m	MPC · JPL
359746	2011 UO_{70}	—	October 14, 2007	Mount Lemmon	Mount Lemmon Survey	EUN	1.1 km	MPC · JPL
359747	2011 UV_{73}	—	September 15, 2007	Mount Lemmon	Mount Lemmon Survey	·	1.2 km	MPC · JPL
359748	2011 UV_{78}	—	February 28, 2008	Mount Lemmon	Mount Lemmon Survey	·	2.5 km	MPC · JPL
359749	2011 UQ_{80}	—	December 21, 2003	Kitt Peak	Spacewatch	·	1.5 km	MPC · JPL
359750	2011 UT_{83}	—	September 30, 2006	Kitt Peak	Spacewatch	HOF	2.8 km	MPC · JPL
359751	2011 UR_{85}	—	October 31, 2000	Socorro	LINEAR	ERI	1.9 km	MPC · JPL
359752	2011 UP_{89}	—	August 20, 2002	Palomar	NEAT	·	1.7 km	MPC · JPL
359753	2011 UT_{89}	—	May 1, 2003	Kitt Peak	Spacewatch	·	2.6 km	MPC · JPL
359754	2011 UQ_{92}	—	August 10, 2002	Cerro Tololo	Deep Ecliptic Survey	·	1.2 km	MPC · JPL
359755	2011 UZ_{92}	—	October 21, 2007	Mount Lemmon	Mount Lemmon Survey	PHO	3.9 km	MPC · JPL
359756	2011 US_{98}	—	September 19, 2003	Kitt Peak	Spacewatch	·	1.8 km	MPC · JPL
359757	2011 UB_{99}	—	October 23, 2005	Catalina	CSS	·	4.3 km	MPC · JPL
359758	2011 UL_{99}	—	October 6, 2000	Haleakala	NEAT	EMA	3.4 km	MPC · JPL
359759	2011 UN_{99}	—	August 19, 2006	Kitt Peak	Spacewatch	·	1.7 km	MPC · JPL
359760	2011 UW_{102}	—	April 22, 2009	Mount Lemmon	Mount Lemmon Survey	fast	2.5 km	MPC · JPL
359761	2011 UE_{105}	—	April 2, 2006	Kitt Peak	Spacewatch	·	1.3 km	MPC · JPL
359762	2011 UF_{108}	—	December 5, 2007	Catalina	CSS	·	1.8 km	MPC · JPL
359763	2011 UA_{113}	—	May 9, 2006	Mount Lemmon	Mount Lemmon Survey	·	1.8 km	MPC · JPL
359764	2011 UP_{113}	—	January 8, 2007	Mount Lemmon	Mount Lemmon Survey	THM	2.1 km	MPC · JPL
359765	2011 UQ_{116}	—	November 1, 2007	Kitt Peak	Spacewatch	·	1.3 km	MPC · JPL
359766	2011 UH_{122}	—	October 23, 2001	Socorro	LINEAR	·	900 m	MPC · JPL
359767	2011 UV_{122}	—	February 20, 2009	Mount Lemmon	Mount Lemmon Survey	·	1.7 km	MPC · JPL
359768	2011 UH_{126}	—	July 9, 2004	Socorro	LINEAR	·	780 m	MPC · JPL
359769	2011 UP_{126}	—	October 21, 2007	Mount Lemmon	Mount Lemmon Survey	·	1.2 km	MPC · JPL
359770	2011 UZ_{126}	—	October 2, 2006	Mount Lemmon	Mount Lemmon Survey	·	1.9 km	MPC · JPL
359771	2011 UV_{127}	—	September 1, 2006	Wrightwood	J. W. Young	WIT	1.1 km	MPC · JPL
359772	2011 UH_{133}	—	October 29, 2005	Catalina	CSS	·	1.3 km	MPC · JPL
359773	2011 US_{134}	—	December 30, 2008	Mount Lemmon	Mount Lemmon Survey	·	850 m	MPC · JPL
359774	2011 UC_{135}	—	May 11, 2005	Palomar	NEAT	·	2.1 km	MPC · JPL
359775	2011 UK_{137}	—	December 24, 2006	Catalina	CSS	·	3.9 km	MPC · JPL
359776	2011 UM_{139}	—	December 18, 2007	Mount Lemmon	Mount Lemmon Survey	·	2.0 km	MPC · JPL
359777	2011 UX_{140}	—	April 18, 2010	WISE	WISE	EMA	4.3 km	MPC · JPL
359778	2011 UH_{142}	—	January 30, 2008	Mount Lemmon	Mount Lemmon Survey	·	2.2 km	MPC · JPL
359779	2011 UR_{145}	—	March 17, 2004	Kitt Peak	Spacewatch	·	1.8 km	MPC · JPL
359780	2011 UP_{146}	—	August 29, 2006	Kitt Peak	Spacewatch	AEO	1.2 km	MPC · JPL
359781	2011 UM_{148}	—	May 30, 2009	Mount Lemmon	Mount Lemmon Survey	·	3.5 km	MPC · JPL
359782	2011 UC_{159}	—	November 16, 2002	Palomar	NEAT	HOF	3.1 km	MPC · JPL
359783	2011 UZ_{159}	—	August 30, 2005	Palomar	NEAT	·	3.5 km	MPC · JPL
359784	2011 UR_{160}	—	November 11, 2007	Mount Lemmon	Mount Lemmon Survey	·	1.7 km	MPC · JPL
359785	2011 UT_{160}	—	March 24, 2003	Kitt Peak	Spacewatch	EOS	2.7 km	MPC · JPL
359786	2011 UM_{163}	—	October 3, 2003	Kitt Peak	Spacewatch	·	1.5 km	MPC · JPL
359787	2011 UW_{163}	—	September 25, 2006	Kitt Peak	Spacewatch	·	1.9 km	MPC · JPL
359788	2011 UK_{183}	—	May 4, 2005	Mount Lemmon	Mount Lemmon Survey	·	1.6 km	MPC · JPL
359789	2011 UP_{183}	—	December 15, 2007	Mount Lemmon	Mount Lemmon Survey	·	1.9 km	MPC · JPL
359790	2011 UO_{185}	—	November 17, 2006	Catalina	CSS	·	2.6 km	MPC · JPL
359791	2011 UA_{186}	—	December 7, 2008	Mount Lemmon	Mount Lemmon Survey	·	1.6 km	MPC · JPL
359792	2011 UD_{191}	—	August 28, 2006	Kitt Peak	Spacewatch	·	1.7 km	MPC · JPL
359793	2011 UV_{193}	—	October 6, 2002	Palomar	NEAT	·	1.8 km	MPC · JPL
359794	2011 UF_{198}	—	August 28, 2006	Kitt Peak	Spacewatch	·	1.6 km	MPC · JPL
359795	2011 UE_{200}	—	October 4, 2006	Mount Lemmon	Mount Lemmon Survey	·	1.9 km	MPC · JPL
359796	2011 UB_{202}	—	March 23, 2006	Mount Lemmon	Mount Lemmon Survey	·	1.4 km	MPC · JPL
359797	2011 UN_{203}	—	June 9, 2010	WISE	WISE	·	3.0 km	MPC · JPL
359798	2011 UE_{211}	—	January 12, 2002	Kitt Peak	Spacewatch	·	1.1 km	MPC · JPL
359799	2011 UG_{238}	—	September 26, 2006	Kitt Peak	Spacewatch	HOF	2.1 km	MPC · JPL
359800	2011 UM_{238}	—	April 8, 2002	Palomar	NEAT	·	1.4 km	MPC · JPL

== 359801–359900 ==
back to top

Designation			Discovery			Properties		Ref
Permanent	Provisional	Named after	Date	Site	Discoverer(s)	Category	Diam.	Ref
359801	2011 UF_{241}	—	November 4, 2004	Catalina	CSS	·	960 m	MPC · JPL
359802	2011 UC_{244}	—	October 11, 2006	Kitt Peak	Spacewatch	·	1.9 km	MPC · JPL
359803	2011 UJ_{245}	—	September 13, 2007	Mount Lemmon	Mount Lemmon Survey	·	1.1 km	MPC · JPL
359804	2011 UR_{247}	—	October 9, 2004	Kitt Peak	Spacewatch	·	950 m	MPC · JPL
359805	2011 UU_{249}	—	April 25, 2003	Kitt Peak	Spacewatch	·	2.6 km	MPC · JPL
359806	2011 US_{251}	—	December 17, 2001	Socorro	LINEAR	·	1.6 km	MPC · JPL
359807	2011 UZ_{251}	—	February 7, 2002	Kitt Peak	Spacewatch	·	1.1 km	MPC · JPL
359808	2011 UC_{252}	—	May 4, 2009	Mount Lemmon	Mount Lemmon Survey	·	1.4 km	MPC · JPL
359809	2011 UA_{259}	—	February 12, 2004	Kitt Peak	Spacewatch	·	1.5 km	MPC · JPL
359810	2011 UJ_{263}	—	September 25, 2007	Mount Lemmon	Mount Lemmon Survey	·	1.2 km	MPC · JPL
359811	2011 UZ_{263}	—	December 15, 2007	Socorro	LINEAR	EUN	1.6 km	MPC · JPL
359812	2011 UZ_{264}	—	January 19, 2004	Anderson Mesa	LONEOS	·	1.7 km	MPC · JPL
359813	2011 UC_{266}	—	October 18, 2002	Palomar	NEAT	·	1.9 km	MPC · JPL
359814	2011 UA_{267}	—	September 10, 2002	Palomar	NEAT	·	2.2 km	MPC · JPL
359815	2011 UM_{275}	—	November 17, 2001	Kitt Peak	Spacewatch	·	1.0 km	MPC · JPL
359816	2011 UO_{279}	—	March 11, 2008	Mount Lemmon	Mount Lemmon Survey	·	3.2 km	MPC · JPL
359817	2011 UH_{280}	—	September 25, 2006	Kitt Peak	Spacewatch	·	1.8 km	MPC · JPL
359818	2011 UW_{280}	—	January 17, 2007	Mount Lemmon	Mount Lemmon Survey	·	3.2 km	MPC · JPL
359819	2011 UY_{281}	—	October 9, 2002	Kitt Peak	Spacewatch	·	1.9 km	MPC · JPL
359820	2011 UA_{290}	—	January 28, 2006	Kitt Peak	Spacewatch	V	720 m	MPC · JPL
359821	2011 UP_{293}	—	January 30, 2004	Kitt Peak	Spacewatch	·	1.3 km	MPC · JPL
359822 Hansboesgaard	2011 UW_{298}	Hansboesgaard	September 24, 2011	Haleakala	Pan-STARRS 1	·	3.0 km	MPC · JPL
359823	2011 US_{301}	—	October 12, 1998	Kitt Peak	Spacewatch	·	1.6 km	MPC · JPL
359824	2011 UJ_{305}	—	October 5, 2002	Palomar	NEAT	·	2.4 km	MPC · JPL
359825	2011 UT_{305}	—	December 30, 2008	Kitt Peak	Spacewatch	·	760 m	MPC · JPL
359826	2011 UR_{307}	—	August 16, 2002	Kitt Peak	Spacewatch	·	1.8 km	MPC · JPL
359827	2011 US_{311}	—	March 31, 2008	Kitt Peak	Spacewatch	·	3.0 km	MPC · JPL
359828	2011 UX_{316}	—	March 29, 2004	Kitt Peak	Spacewatch	·	2.0 km	MPC · JPL
359829	2011 UG_{317}	—	January 14, 2002	Kitt Peak	Spacewatch	THM	2.0 km	MPC · JPL
359830	2011 UE_{318}	—	November 20, 2001	Socorro	LINEAR	·	650 m	MPC · JPL
359831	2011 UX_{319}	—	February 12, 2004	Kitt Peak	Spacewatch	·	1.5 km	MPC · JPL
359832	2011 UH_{320}	—	November 25, 2006	Kitt Peak	Spacewatch	EOS	2.6 km	MPC · JPL
359833	2011 US_{320}	—	October 16, 2007	Catalina	CSS	·	1.8 km	MPC · JPL
359834	2011 UX_{320}	—	December 29, 2003	Kitt Peak	Spacewatch	·	1.8 km	MPC · JPL
359835	2011 UX_{323}	—	September 19, 2006	Kitt Peak	Spacewatch	·	1.8 km	MPC · JPL
359836	2011 UB_{333}	—	February 17, 2004	Haleakala	NEAT	·	1.9 km	MPC · JPL
359837	2011 UX_{333}	—	March 27, 2003	Kitt Peak	Spacewatch	·	960 m	MPC · JPL
359838	2011 UH_{337}	—	September 29, 1995	Kitt Peak	Spacewatch	·	2.6 km	MPC · JPL
359839	2011 UV_{338}	—	October 3, 2006	Mount Lemmon	Mount Lemmon Survey	·	1.6 km	MPC · JPL
359840	2011 UW_{340}	—	September 17, 2006	Kitt Peak	Spacewatch	KOR	1.1 km	MPC · JPL
359841	2011 UX_{342}	—	March 10, 2008	Kitt Peak	Spacewatch	·	2.1 km	MPC · JPL
359842	2011 UG_{343}	—	March 23, 2004	Kitt Peak	Spacewatch	·	1.7 km	MPC · JPL
359843	2011 UL_{343}	—	January 28, 2009	Catalina	CSS	V	740 m	MPC · JPL
359844	2011 UN_{343}	—	December 25, 1995	Kitt Peak	Spacewatch	·	3.3 km	MPC · JPL
359845	2011 UU_{345}	—	December 13, 2006	Mount Lemmon	Mount Lemmon Survey	·	2.2 km	MPC · JPL
359846	2011 UR_{351}	—	November 1, 2006	Kitt Peak	Spacewatch	·	1.6 km	MPC · JPL
359847	2011 UK_{352}	—	September 28, 2011	Nizhny Arkhyz	Gerke, V., A. Novichonok	PAD	1.9 km	MPC · JPL
359848	2011 UU_{353}	—	October 21, 2006	Mount Lemmon	Mount Lemmon Survey	·	1.8 km	MPC · JPL
359849	2011 UR_{359}	—	January 18, 2009	Catalina	CSS	V	890 m	MPC · JPL
359850	2011 UY_{359}	—	August 21, 2006	Kitt Peak	Spacewatch	·	1.9 km	MPC · JPL
359851	2011 UH_{369}	—	February 27, 2009	Kitt Peak	Spacewatch	·	1.6 km	MPC · JPL
359852	2011 UF_{382}	—	August 29, 2005	Kitt Peak	Spacewatch	LIX	3.3 km	MPC · JPL
359853	2011 UQ_{382}	—	March 27, 2003	Kitt Peak	Spacewatch	EOS	2.6 km	MPC · JPL
359854	2011 UB_{383}	—	August 21, 2006	Kitt Peak	Spacewatch	·	1.9 km	MPC · JPL
359855	2011 UN_{383}	—	August 29, 2006	Kitt Peak	Spacewatch	·	2.1 km	MPC · JPL
359856	2011 US_{384}	—	October 23, 2006	Mount Lemmon	Mount Lemmon Survey	·	1.8 km	MPC · JPL
359857	2011 UN_{400}	—	December 5, 2007	Kitt Peak	Spacewatch	·	1.9 km	MPC · JPL
359858	2011 UU_{401}	—	October 20, 2003	Kitt Peak	Spacewatch	3:2	4.2 km	MPC · JPL
359859	2011 US_{406}	—	January 15, 1996	Kitt Peak	Spacewatch	·	1.6 km	MPC · JPL
359860	2011 VF_{1}	—	November 25, 2006	Kitt Peak	Spacewatch	EOS	2.0 km	MPC · JPL
359861	2011 VL_{2}	—	December 31, 2007	Catalina	CSS	HNS	1.8 km	MPC · JPL
359862	2011 VD_{3}	—	August 26, 2005	Palomar	NEAT	·	3.1 km	MPC · JPL
359863	2011 VR_{4}	—	February 12, 2008	Mount Lemmon	Mount Lemmon Survey	·	3.0 km	MPC · JPL
359864	2011 VE_{12}	—	October 21, 2006	Mount Lemmon	Mount Lemmon Survey	·	2.0 km	MPC · JPL
359865	2011 VR_{13}	—	October 16, 2003	Kitt Peak	Spacewatch	·	1.5 km	MPC · JPL
359866	2011 VC_{18}	—	January 28, 2006	Kitt Peak	Spacewatch	·	820 m	MPC · JPL
359867	2011 VW_{20}	—	April 11, 2005	Kitt Peak	Spacewatch	·	1.9 km	MPC · JPL
359868	2011 WG	—	March 26, 2003	Kitt Peak	Spacewatch	·	820 m	MPC · JPL
359869	2011 WW_{3}	—	March 3, 2009	Mount Lemmon	Mount Lemmon Survey	(5)	1.8 km	MPC · JPL
359870	2011 WC_{6}	—	February 26, 2007	Mount Lemmon	Mount Lemmon Survey	CYB	4.0 km	MPC · JPL
359871	2011 WO_{8}	—	October 22, 1995	Kitt Peak	Spacewatch	·	1.7 km	MPC · JPL
359872	2011 WL_{10}	—	May 13, 2005	Mount Lemmon	Mount Lemmon Survey	·	1.6 km	MPC · JPL
359873	2011 WD_{11}	—	March 13, 2005	Mount Lemmon	Mount Lemmon Survey	·	1.4 km	MPC · JPL
359874	2011 WX_{11}	—	September 8, 2000	Kitt Peak	Spacewatch	·	1.2 km	MPC · JPL
359875	2011 WE_{13}	—	November 27, 2006	Kitt Peak	Spacewatch	·	1.8 km	MPC · JPL
359876	2011 WA_{21}	—	October 28, 2005	Kitt Peak	Spacewatch	·	3.3 km	MPC · JPL
359877	2011 WO_{22}	—	November 8, 2007	Mount Lemmon	Mount Lemmon Survey	·	1.9 km	MPC · JPL
359878	2011 WR_{26}	—	August 21, 2006	Kitt Peak	Spacewatch	·	1.8 km	MPC · JPL
359879	2011 WX_{28}	—	May 28, 2009	Mount Lemmon	Mount Lemmon Survey	EOS	2.6 km	MPC · JPL
359880	2011 WX_{30}	—	August 27, 2005	Kitt Peak	Spacewatch	·	2.7 km	MPC · JPL
359881	2011 WU_{32}	—	March 27, 2003	Palomar	NEAT	·	820 m	MPC · JPL
359882	2011 WA_{34}	—	October 19, 2006	Mount Lemmon	Mount Lemmon Survey	HOF	2.3 km	MPC · JPL
359883	2011 WE_{43}	—	November 25, 2000	Socorro	LINEAR	·	3.2 km	MPC · JPL
359884	2011 WS_{43}	—	December 15, 2006	Kitt Peak	Spacewatch	(31811)	3.7 km	MPC · JPL
359885	2011 WV_{43}	—	June 13, 2005	Mount Lemmon	Mount Lemmon Survey	AGN	1.7 km	MPC · JPL
359886	2011 WW_{43}	—	April 10, 2005	Siding Spring	SSS	EUN	1.8 km	MPC · JPL
359887	2011 WN_{44}	—	February 13, 2008	Kitt Peak	Spacewatch	·	1.8 km	MPC · JPL
359888	2011 WZ_{44}	—	September 29, 2005	Kitt Peak	Spacewatch	·	2.6 km	MPC · JPL
359889	2011 WO_{48}	—	February 27, 2008	Mount Lemmon	Mount Lemmon Survey	·	2.1 km	MPC · JPL
359890	2011 WP_{48}	—	July 31, 2005	Palomar	NEAT	·	3.1 km	MPC · JPL
359891	2011 WL_{49}	—	April 13, 1997	Kitt Peak	Spacewatch	·	1.8 km	MPC · JPL
359892	2011 WP_{52}	—	October 1, 2005	Mount Lemmon	Mount Lemmon Survey	KOR	1.3 km	MPC · JPL
359893	2011 WT_{55}	—	November 22, 2006	Mount Lemmon	Mount Lemmon Survey	·	2.6 km	MPC · JPL
359894	2011 WD_{58}	—	April 6, 2008	Mount Lemmon	Mount Lemmon Survey	·	1.7 km	MPC · JPL
359895	2011 WU_{58}	—	January 12, 2002	Mount Nyukasa	National Aerospace Laboratory of Japan	·	1.1 km	MPC · JPL
359896	2011 WN_{59}	—	September 13, 2007	Catalina	CSS	V	720 m	MPC · JPL
359897	2011 WJ_{60}	—	November 17, 2004	Siding Spring	SSS	·	880 m	MPC · JPL
359898	2011 WQ_{60}	—	September 15, 2006	Kitt Peak	Spacewatch	·	1.8 km	MPC · JPL
359899	2011 WA_{61}	—	December 6, 2007	Kitt Peak	Spacewatch	·	1.4 km	MPC · JPL
359900	2011 WE_{63}	—	October 5, 2003	Kitt Peak	Spacewatch	·	1.5 km	MPC · JPL

== 359901–360000 ==
back to top

Designation			Discovery			Properties		Ref
Permanent	Provisional	Named after	Date	Site	Discoverer(s)	Category	Diam.	Ref
359901	2011 WB_{69}	—	December 28, 2003	Socorro	LINEAR	·	1.7 km	MPC · JPL
359902	2011 WK_{71}	—	October 24, 2005	Kitt Peak	Spacewatch	·	2.6 km	MPC · JPL
359903	2011 WE_{73}	—	August 14, 2001	Haleakala	NEAT	·	880 m	MPC · JPL
359904	2011 WP_{81}	—	November 5, 2007	Mount Lemmon	Mount Lemmon Survey	(17392)	1.7 km	MPC · JPL
359905	2011 WX_{82}	—	December 20, 2007	Mount Lemmon	Mount Lemmon Survey	·	2.0 km	MPC · JPL
359906	2011 WY_{88}	—	October 26, 2005	Kitt Peak	Spacewatch	THM	2.0 km	MPC · JPL
359907	2011 WS_{90}	—	October 12, 2007	Kitt Peak	Spacewatch	·	3.1 km	MPC · JPL
359908	2011 WW_{90}	—	December 17, 2007	Kitt Peak	Spacewatch	·	1.9 km	MPC · JPL
359909	2011 WF_{101}	—	February 9, 2007	Catalina	CSS	·	3.7 km	MPC · JPL
359910	2011 WD_{102}	—	May 14, 2005	Mount Lemmon	Mount Lemmon Survey	·	6.0 km	MPC · JPL
359911	2011 WY_{102}	—	February 7, 2002	Kitt Peak	Deep Ecliptic Survey	·	3.0 km	MPC · JPL
359912	2011 WS_{108}	—	February 16, 2004	Kitt Peak	Spacewatch	·	1.8 km	MPC · JPL
359913	2011 WA_{110}	—	September 30, 2005	Mount Lemmon	Mount Lemmon Survey	·	2.0 km	MPC · JPL
359914	2011 WJ_{114}	—	December 20, 2006	Catalina	CSS	·	3.0 km	MPC · JPL
359915	2011 WC_{116}	—	November 20, 2004	Kitt Peak	Spacewatch	·	1.3 km	MPC · JPL
359916	2011 WB_{117}	—	December 14, 2007	Kitt Peak	Spacewatch	(5)	1.8 km	MPC · JPL
359917	2011 WS_{124}	—	August 9, 2005	Cerro Tololo	Deep Ecliptic Survey	·	2.3 km	MPC · JPL
359918	2011 WX_{125}	—	March 19, 2009	Kitt Peak	Spacewatch	·	1.6 km	MPC · JPL
359919	2011 WT_{129}	—	August 21, 2006	Palomar	NEAT	·	2.0 km	MPC · JPL
359920	2011 WS_{131}	—	September 26, 2005	Kitt Peak	Spacewatch	·	2.1 km	MPC · JPL
359921	2011 WY_{134}	—	January 16, 2004	Palomar	NEAT	·	2.0 km	MPC · JPL
359922	2011 WN_{137}	—	July 5, 2005	Mount Lemmon	Mount Lemmon Survey	·	3.3 km	MPC · JPL
359923	2011 WR_{137}	—	October 3, 2005	Catalina	CSS	·	3.8 km	MPC · JPL
359924	2011 WY_{137}	—	March 4, 2006	Mount Lemmon	Mount Lemmon Survey	·	850 m	MPC · JPL
359925	2011 WD_{145}	—	December 18, 2007	Mount Lemmon	Mount Lemmon Survey	·	2.0 km	MPC · JPL
359926	2011 WA_{146}	—	March 30, 2008	Kitt Peak	Spacewatch	·	3.2 km	MPC · JPL
359927	2011 WJ_{147}	—	August 29, 2005	Kitt Peak	Spacewatch	·	2.6 km	MPC · JPL
359928	2011 WB_{151}	—	February 11, 2002	Socorro	LINEAR	·	3.0 km	MPC · JPL
359929	2011 WH_{151}	—	December 22, 2003	Kitt Peak	Spacewatch	·	2.3 km	MPC · JPL
359930	2011 WN_{152}	—	October 13, 2010	Mount Lemmon	Mount Lemmon Survey	VER	3.7 km	MPC · JPL
359931	2011 WR_{152}	—	March 6, 2008	Mount Lemmon	Mount Lemmon Survey	·	2.2 km	MPC · JPL
359932	2011 XX_{3}	—	November 11, 2007	Mount Lemmon	Mount Lemmon Survey	WIT	1.1 km	MPC · JPL
359933	2011 YF_{2}	—	May 25, 2003	Kitt Peak	Spacewatch	·	4.0 km	MPC · JPL
359934	2011 YX_{16}	—	November 25, 2005	Catalina	CSS	·	3.9 km	MPC · JPL
359935	2011 YX_{17}	—	January 31, 2008	Catalina	CSS	·	2.3 km	MPC · JPL
359936	2011 YW_{20}	—	June 29, 2010	WISE	WISE	LUT	5.6 km	MPC · JPL
359937	2011 YQ_{24}	—	December 5, 1999	Kitt Peak	Spacewatch	L4	10 km	MPC · JPL
359938	2011 YN_{34}	—	January 31, 2008	Mount Lemmon	Mount Lemmon Survey	(5)	2.5 km	MPC · JPL
359939	2011 YF_{38}	—	March 4, 2000	Kitt Peak	Spacewatch	L4	10 km	MPC · JPL
359940	2011 YR_{44}	—	April 11, 2003	Kitt Peak	Spacewatch	L4	10 km	MPC · JPL
359941	2011 YQ_{52}	—	April 25, 2003	Kitt Peak	Spacewatch	·	3.0 km	MPC · JPL
359942	2011 YQ_{61}	—	May 5, 2003	Kitt Peak	Spacewatch	EOS	2.4 km	MPC · JPL
359943	2011 YG_{75}	—	October 13, 2009	Bergisch Gladbach	W. Bickel	L4 · ERY	8.5 km	MPC · JPL
359944	2012 AS_{1}	—	November 28, 2005	Catalina	CSS	·	3.4 km	MPC · JPL
359945	2012 AR_{8}	—	June 12, 2007	Mauna Kea	D. D. Balam, K. M. Perrett	L4	7.5 km	MPC · JPL
359946	2012 AX_{15}	—	April 11, 2002	Palomar	NEAT	·	5.0 km	MPC · JPL
359947	2012 AN_{19}	—	July 29, 2006	Siding Spring	SSS	·	1.6 km	MPC · JPL
359948	2012 AG_{24}	—	December 1, 2005	Kitt Peak	Spacewatch	·	4.2 km	MPC · JPL
359949	2012 BM	—	November 16, 2006	Mount Lemmon	Mount Lemmon Survey	EOS	2.7 km	MPC · JPL
359950	2012 BF_{2}	—	November 6, 1991	Kitt Peak	Spacewatch	·	2.2 km	MPC · JPL
359951	2012 BD_{12}	—	May 27, 2009	Mount Lemmon	Mount Lemmon Survey	·	4.5 km	MPC · JPL
359952	2012 BL_{29}	—	May 11, 2003	Kitt Peak	Spacewatch	KOR	1.9 km	MPC · JPL
359953	2012 BS_{31}	—	February 22, 2007	Kitt Peak	Spacewatch	·	3.1 km	MPC · JPL
359954	2012 BT_{31}	—	May 15, 2004	Siding Spring	SSS	·	2.8 km	MPC · JPL
359955	2012 BZ_{31}	—	November 30, 2005	Kitt Peak	Spacewatch	HYG	3.5 km	MPC · JPL
359956	2012 BB_{41}	—	July 7, 2005	Kitt Peak	Spacewatch	·	2.0 km	MPC · JPL
359957	2012 BY_{50}	—	December 6, 2010	Mount Lemmon	Mount Lemmon Survey	L4	8.8 km	MPC · JPL
359958	2012 BV_{51}	—	July 24, 2003	Palomar	NEAT	·	3.6 km	MPC · JPL
359959	2012 BW_{59}	—	June 23, 2009	Mount Lemmon	Mount Lemmon Survey	EOS	2.5 km	MPC · JPL
359960	2012 BQ_{61}	—	October 12, 2009	Mount Lemmon	Mount Lemmon Survey	L4	10 km	MPC · JPL
359961	2012 BN_{71}	—	October 9, 2008	Mount Lemmon	Mount Lemmon Survey	L4	10 km	MPC · JPL
359962	2012 BB_{76}	—	October 26, 1995	Kitt Peak	Spacewatch	·	4.0 km	MPC · JPL
359963	2012 BX_{76}	—	October 26, 2009	Kitt Peak	Spacewatch	L4	9.0 km	MPC · JPL
359964	2012 BV_{88}	—	March 11, 2007	Anderson Mesa	LONEOS	VER	4.1 km	MPC · JPL
359965	2012 BA_{97}	—	September 24, 2008	Kitt Peak	Spacewatch	L4	10 km	MPC · JPL
359966	2012 BP_{129}	—	July 9, 2005	Kitt Peak	Spacewatch	L4	8.3 km	MPC · JPL
359967	2012 BD_{151}	—	November 13, 2006	Catalina	CSS	BRA	2.2 km	MPC · JPL
359968	2012 BT_{151}	—	January 19, 2004	Kitt Peak	Spacewatch	3:2	7.3 km	MPC · JPL
359969	2012 CM_{17}	—	August 24, 2007	Kitt Peak	Spacewatch	L4	9.4 km	MPC · JPL
359970	2012 DV_{97}	—	August 31, 2005	Palomar	NEAT	·	2.4 km	MPC · JPL
359971	2012 DJ_{98}	—	July 30, 1995	Kitt Peak	Spacewatch	·	2.9 km	MPC · JPL
359972	2012 FF_{77}	—	March 13, 2002	Kitt Peak	Spacewatch	·	2.6 km	MPC · JPL
359973	2012 GO_{14}	—	September 14, 1999	Kitt Peak	Spacewatch	·	2.0 km	MPC · JPL
359974	2012 HS_{2}	—	December 28, 2011	Mount Lemmon	Mount Lemmon Survey	L4	10 km	MPC · JPL
359975	2012 HQ_{13}	—	October 26, 2009	Kitt Peak	Spacewatch	L4	8.9 km	MPC · JPL
359976	2012 TZ_{166}	—	November 9, 1999	Socorro	LINEAR	·	2.2 km	MPC · JPL
359977	2012 TR_{169}	—	April 24, 2006	Kitt Peak	Spacewatch	·	2.2 km	MPC · JPL
359978	2012 TB_{241}	—	August 27, 2001	Palomar	NEAT	HYG	3.3 km	MPC · JPL
359979	2012 TJ_{318}	—	September 24, 2003	Haleakala	NEAT	·	2.6 km	MPC · JPL
359980	2012 UZ_{32}	—	November 7, 2007	Kitt Peak	Spacewatch	·	2.8 km	MPC · JPL
359981	2012 UK_{86}	—	February 16, 2004	Kitt Peak	Spacewatch	·	2.2 km	MPC · JPL
359982	2012 UQ_{109}	—	January 18, 2007	Palomar	NEAT	·	5.0 km	MPC · JPL
359983	2012 UM_{169}	—	October 15, 2003	Palomar	NEAT	EUN	1.8 km	MPC · JPL
359984	2012 VE_{16}	—	October 10, 1996	Kitt Peak	Spacewatch	·	2.4 km	MPC · JPL
359985	2012 VU_{30}	—	April 26, 2003	Kitt Peak	Spacewatch	NYS	1.1 km	MPC · JPL
359986	2012 VQ_{33}	—	February 21, 2003	Palomar	NEAT	·	3.2 km	MPC · JPL
359987	2012 VR_{33}	—	August 18, 2006	Kitt Peak	Spacewatch	·	2.6 km	MPC · JPL
359988	2012 VH_{39}	—	November 20, 2003	Socorro	LINEAR	·	2.5 km	MPC · JPL
359989	2012 VA_{46}	—	January 16, 2004	Kitt Peak	Spacewatch	·	2.3 km	MPC · JPL
359990	2012 VX_{56}	—	November 2, 2007	Mount Lemmon	Mount Lemmon Survey	EOS	2.2 km	MPC · JPL
359991	2012 VW_{68}	—	October 10, 2007	Kitt Peak	Spacewatch	KOR	1.4 km	MPC · JPL
359992	2012 VW_{84}	—	September 12, 2005	Kitt Peak	Spacewatch	HYG	3.5 km	MPC · JPL
359993	2012 VH_{93}	—	April 22, 2009	Mount Lemmon	Mount Lemmon Survey	CYB	3.6 km	MPC · JPL
359994	2012 VG_{98}	—	May 15, 2005	Mount Lemmon	Mount Lemmon Survey	·	2.6 km	MPC · JPL
359995	2012 VA_{102}	—	August 29, 2006	Kitt Peak	Spacewatch	·	2.2 km	MPC · JPL
359996	2012 VG_{104}	—	October 6, 1996	Kitt Peak	Spacewatch	·	2.6 km	MPC · JPL
359997	2012 VJ_{107}	—	January 15, 2004	Kitt Peak	Spacewatch	·	2.7 km	MPC · JPL
359998	2012 XV_{7}	—	October 10, 2001	Palomar	NEAT	·	4.4 km	MPC · JPL
359999	2012 XX_{10}	—	October 1, 1995	Kitt Peak	Spacewatch	THM	1.8 km	MPC · JPL
360000	2012 XX_{21}	—	December 18, 2001	Socorro	LINEAR	THM	2.3 km	MPC · JPL

back to top

== See also ==
- Meanings of minor-planet names: 359001–360000
