= List of Jupiter trojans (Greek camp) (300001–400000) =

This is a partial list of Jupiter's L_{4} trojans (60° ahead of Jupiter) with numbers 300001–400000. If available, an object's mean diameter is taken from the NEOWISE data release, which the Small-Body Database has also adopted. Mean diameters are rounded to two significant figures if smaller than 100 kilometers. Estimates are in italics and calculated from a magnitude-to-diameter conversion, using an assumed albedo of 0.057.

== 300001–400000 ==
This list contains 1,109 objects sorted in numerical order.

Designation	Discovery			Orbital description					Diam.	Remarks	Refs
Designation	Date	Observer	Site	a (AU)	e	i (°)	q (AU)	Q (AU)	Diam.	Remarks	Refs
(301018) 2008 RN_{126}	3 September 2008	Spacewatch	Kitt Peak	5.140	0.037	5.2	4.949	5.330	11 km	–	catalog · MPC · JPL
(301037) 2008 SN_{291}	22 September 2008	CSS	Catalina	5.220	0.082	12.1	4.789	5.650	11 km	–	catalog · MPC · JPL
(301579) 2009 UC_{87}	24 October 2009	CSS	Catalina	5.193	0.108	5.2	4.631	5.755	12 km	–	catalog · MPC · JPL
(301580) 2009 UT_{94}	21 October 2009	MLS	Mount Lemmon	5.183	0.038	10.6	4.987	5.380	11 km	–	catalog · MPC · JPL
(301944) 2000 AS_{254}	3 January 2000	Spacewatch	Kitt Peak	5.219	0.137	27.1	4.502	5.936	13 km	–	catalog · MPC · JPL
(305544) 2008 QS_{47}	26 June 2007	Spacewatch	Kitt Peak	5.142	0.141	15.3	4.415	5.868	13 km	–	catalog · MPC · JPL
(306000) 2009 TS_{21}	27 May 2004	Spacewatch	Kitt Peak	5.171	0.050	9.6	4.911	5.431	14 km	–	catalog · MPC · JPL
(306001) 2009 TD_{42}	15 October 2009	OAM	La Sagra	5.243	0.155	10.1	4.431	6.054	10 km	–	catalog · MPC · JPL
(306003) 2009 WM_{32}	16 November 2009	MLS	Mount Lemmon	5.223	0.091	7.7	4.750	5.697	11 km	–	catalog · MPC · JPL
(306177) 2010 US_{82}	13 June 2005	MLS	Mount Lemmon	5.171	0.061	8.7	4.856	5.487	12 km	–	catalog · MPC · JPL
(306178) 2010 WR_{11}	13 March 2002	NEAT	Palomar	5.107	0.144	10.4	4.372	5.841	11 km	–	catalog · MPC · JPL
(306179) 2010 WA_{55}	2 April 2003	Deep Lens Survey	Cerro Tololo	5.197	0.087	6.2	4.744	5.649	8.6 km	–	catalog · MPC · JPL
(306753) 2000 YM_{25}	29 December 2000	Spacewatch	Kitt Peak	5.136	0.014	6.1	5.064	5.207	11 km	–	catalog · MPC · JPL
(307560) 2003 EE_{54}	12 March 2003	NEAT	Palomar	5.120	0.034	13.4	4.948	5.292	12 km	–	catalog · MPC · JPL
(307569) 2003 FR_{68}	26 March 2003	NEAT	Palomar	5.184	0.062	9.2	4.862	5.506	13 km	–	catalog · MPC · JPL
(308314) 2005 LZ_{45}	13 June 2005	Spacewatch	Kitt Peak	5.171	0.080	22.9	4.759	5.583	15 km	–	catalog · MPC · JPL
(309707) 2008 GC_{1}	1 April 2008	MLS	Mount Lemmon	5.101	0.069	34.8	4.748	5.454	20 km	–	catalog · MPC · JPL
(309733) 2008 RK_{4}	2 September 2008	Spacewatch	Kitt Peak	5.231	0.035	7.7	5.049	5.413	8.7 km	–	catalog · MPC · JPL
(309735) 2008 RK_{50}	3 September 2008	Spacewatch	Kitt Peak	5.191	0.077	7.1	4.791	5.590	9.9 km	–	catalog · MPC · JPL
(310005) 2009 KE	16 May 2009	MLS	Mount Lemmon	5.191	0.041	34.7	4.981	5.402	20 km	–	catalog · MPC · JPL
(310022) 2009 RJ_{63}	14 September 2009	Spacewatch	Kitt Peak	5.097	0.049	4.1	4.849	5.346	8.3 km	–	catalog · MPC · JPL
(310025) 2009 TO_{26}	14 October 2009	OAM	La Sagra	5.201	0.155	12.9	4.395	6.007	13 km	–	catalog · MPC · JPL
(310027) 2010 AH_{95}	8 February 2002	NEAT	Palomar	5.205	0.072	13.0	4.828	5.582	11 km	–	catalog · MPC · JPL
(310103) 2010 TL_{171}	14 October 1998	Spacewatch	Kitt Peak	5.167	0.019	4.3	5.071	5.264	11 km	–	catalog · MPC · JPL
(310104) 2010 UX_{28}	22 November 1997	Spacewatch	Kitt Peak	5.279	0.030	15.7	5.119	5.440	11 km	–	catalog · MPC · JPL
(310105) 2010 UW_{35}	6 February 2002	Spacewatch	Kitt Peak	5.134	0.024	4.1	5.011	5.257	8.3 km	–	catalog · MPC · JPL
(310106) 2010 UV_{51}	17 January 2001	Spacewatch	Kitt Peak	5.167	0.125	8.0	4.520	5.815	12 km	–	catalog · MPC · JPL
(310107) 2010 UB_{96}	29 October 2010	CSS	Catalina	5.181	0.119	18.4	4.564	5.798	14 km	–	catalog · MPC · JPL
(310110) 2010 VJ_{34}	21 September 2008	CSS	Catalina	5.207	0.030	9.2	5.053	5.362	12 km	–	catalog · MPC · JPL
(310112) 2010 VW_{176}	22 June 2007	Spacewatch	Kitt Peak	5.174	0.069	11.2	4.819	5.530	12 km	–	catalog · MPC · JPL
(310115) 2010 WF_{13}	7 April 2003	Spacewatch	Kitt Peak	5.200	0.076	7.2	4.802	5.597	11 km	–	catalog · MPC · JPL
(310382) 1995 QD_{6}	22 August 1995	Spacewatch	Kitt Peak	5.203	0.008	17.0	5.162	5.244	11 km	–	catalog · MPC · JPL
(310397) 1998 WF_{37}	15 November 1998	Spacewatch	Kitt Peak	5.207	0.105	7.8	4.657	5.756	13 km	–	catalog · MPC · JPL
(310432) 1999 XN_{226}	14 December 1999	Spacewatch	Kitt Peak	5.312	0.053	22.1	5.032	5.593	14 km	–	catalog · MPC · JPL
(310433) 2000 AH_{1}	13 January 2000	Spacewatch	Kitt Peak	5.300	0.033	28.9	5.127	5.473	14 km	–	catalog · MPC · JPL
(310439) 2000 AT_{253}	7 January 2000	Spacewatch	Kitt Peak	5.247	0.023	9.0	5.126	5.368	12 km	–	catalog · MPC · JPL
(310641) 2002 CZ_{206}	10 February 2002	LINEAR	Socorro	5.166	0.006	13.4	5.133	5.199	13 km	–	catalog · MPC · JPL
(310645) 2002 CV_{229}	10 February 2002	Spacewatch	Kitt Peak	5.109	0.053	8.3	4.839	5.379	9.1 km	–	catalog · MPC · JPL
(310655) 2002 DK_{20}	17 October 2010	MLS	Mount Lemmon	5.181	0.123	2.4	4.545	5.817	8.6 km	–	catalog · MPC · JPL
(310666) 2002 EW_{124}	12 March 2002	NEAT	Palomar	5.113	0.088	15.7	4.662	5.563	14 km	–	catalog · MPC · JPL
(310668) 2002 EQ_{140}	12 March 2002	NEAT	Palomar	5.147	0.073	8.4	4.774	5.521	11 km	–	catalog · MPC · JPL
(310670) 2002 EY_{162}	10 March 2002	NEAT	Haleakala	5.107	0.068	18.9	4.757	5.456	12 km	–	catalog · MPC · JPL
(310867) 2003 GF_{28}	7 April 2003	Spacewatch	Kitt Peak	5.194	0.074	3.5	4.809	5.579	8.5 km	–	catalog · MPC · JPL
(310870) 2003 GD_{48}	9 April 2003	NEAT	Palomar	5.239	0.065	9.1	4.898	5.580	10 km	–	catalog · MPC · JPL
(310871) 2003 GG_{57}	11 April 2003	Spacewatch	Kitt Peak	5.283	0.021	14.5	5.171	5.394	13 km	–	catalog · MPC · JPL
(310872) 2003 HF_{14}	26 April 2003	Spacewatch	Kitt Peak	5.213	0.020	29.3	5.110	5.317	15 km	–	catalog · MPC · JPL
(311592) 2006 JC_{42}	9 May 2006	MLS	Mount Lemmon	5.300	0.045	17.8	5.060	5.540	13 km	–	catalog · MPC · JPL
(311615) 2006 PP_{31}	14 August 2006	Siding Spring Survey	Siding Spring	5.227	0.038	12.0	5.029	5.425	13 km	–	catalog · MPC · JPL
(311997) 2007 MW_{2}	16 June 2007	Spacewatch	Kitt Peak	5.177	0.076	6.0	4.782	5.571	11 km	–	catalog · MPC · JPL
(312001) 2007 PK_{2}	5 August 2007	W. K. Y. Yeung	7300	5.178	0.122	18.0	4.545	5.810	13 km	–	catalog · MPC · JPL
(312023) 2007 RT_{75}	10 September 2007	MLS	Mount Lemmon	5.372	0.028	4.4	5.220	5.523	9.5 km	–	catalog · MPC · JPL
(312457) 2008 QH_{42}	23 August 2008	Spacewatch	Kitt Peak	5.292	0.092	15.9	4.803	5.781	15 km	–	catalog · MPC · JPL
(312458) 2008 QS_{42}	24 August 2008	Spacewatch	Kitt Peak	5.259	0.053	3.7	4.980	5.539	8.3 km	–	catalog · MPC · JPL
(312459) 2008 QG_{44}	25 August 2008	Siding Spring Survey	Siding Spring	5.218	0.089	24.1	4.753	5.684	16 km	–	catalog · MPC · JPL
(312461) 2008 RK_{14}	4 September 2008	Spacewatch	Kitt Peak	5.134	0.030	6.3	4.979	5.289	14 km	–	catalog · MPC · JPL
(312462) 2008 RG_{17}	4 September 2008	Spacewatch	Kitt Peak	5.157	0.062	5.7	4.837	5.476	8.0 km	–	catalog · MPC · JPL
(312463) 2008 RZ_{20}	4 September 2008	Spacewatch	Kitt Peak	5.192	0.062	8.5	4.870	5.514	13 km	–	catalog · MPC · JPL
(312464) 2008 RD_{46}	2 September 2008	Spacewatch	Kitt Peak	5.217	0.080	4.2	4.798	5.636	8.6 km	–	catalog · MPC · JPL
(312465) 2008 RJ_{109}	2 September 2008	Spacewatch	Kitt Peak	5.196	0.086	3.2	4.747	5.645	8.4 km	–	catalog · MPC · JPL
(312466) 2008 RZ_{122}	5 September 2008	Spacewatch	Kitt Peak	5.255	0.052	4.6	4.983	5.526	9.5 km	–	catalog · MPC · JPL
(312467) 2008 SH_{50}	20 September 2008	MLS	Mount Lemmon	5.181	0.060	5.4	4.869	5.493	9.1 km	–	catalog · MPC · JPL
(312468) 2008 SY_{61}	21 September 2008	Spacewatch	Kitt Peak	5.082	0.054	8.3	4.807	5.357	8.0 km	–	catalog · MPC · JPL
(312469) 2008 SN_{83}	27 September 2008	W. Ries	Altschwendt	5.220	0.103	0.7	4.681	5.758	8.3 km	–	catalog · MPC · JPL
(312471) 2008 ST_{153}	22 September 2008	LINEAR	Socorro	5.238	0.097	11.1	4.731	5.746	15 km	–	catalog · MPC · JPL
(312472) 2008 SX_{216}	29 September 2008	MLS	Mount Lemmon	5.243	0.057	7.7	4.945	5.542	8.3 km	–	catalog · MPC · JPL
(312474) 2008 SP_{252}	19 September 2008	Spacewatch	Kitt Peak	5.293	0.073	7.0	4.904	5.682	14 km	–	catalog · MPC · JPL
(312475) 2008 SW_{275}	23 September 2008	MLS	Mount Lemmon	5.361	0.040	5.1	5.146	5.577	7.9 km	–	catalog · MPC · JPL
(312476) 2008 SJ_{277}	24 September 2008	MLS	Mount Lemmon	5.307	0.037	24.2	5.110	5.505	14 km	–	catalog · MPC · JPL
(312477) 2008 SD_{278}	28 September 2008	MLS	Mount Lemmon	5.186	0.069	6.6	4.826	5.545	8.3 km	–	catalog · MPC · JPL
(312478) 2008 SN_{293}	29 September 2008	CSS	Catalina	5.251	0.090	9.4	4.778	5.725	11 km	–	catalog · MPC · JPL
(312479) 2008 TX_{35}	1 October 2008	MLS	Mount Lemmon	5.188	0.065	2.9	4.850	5.526	7.9 km	–	catalog · MPC · JPL
(312480) 2008 TN_{49}	2 October 2008	Spacewatch	Kitt Peak	5.186	0.058	12.3	4.884	5.487	12 km	–	catalog · MPC · JPL
(312482) 2008 TE_{127}	8 October 2008	MLS	Mount Lemmon	5.269	0.032	7.0	5.098	5.440	12 km	–	catalog · MPC · JPL
(312483) 2008 TD_{174}	2 October 2008	MLS	Mount Lemmon	5.141	0.073	3.2	4.764	5.518	8.5 km	–	catalog · MPC · JPL
(312484) 2008 UL_{15}	18 October 2008	Spacewatch	Kitt Peak	5.269	0.065	5.0	4.928	5.611	9.4 km	–	catalog · MPC · JPL
(312486) 2008 UE_{190}	25 October 2008	MLS	Mount Lemmon	5.282	0.072	5.2	4.904	5.661	8.9 km	–	catalog · MPC · JPL
(312487) 2008 UZ_{235}	26 October 2008	MLS	Mount Lemmon	5.257	0.036	5.6	5.067	5.447	11 km	–	catalog · MPC · JPL
(312608) 2009 RU_{53}	15 September 2009	Spacewatch	Kitt Peak	5.240	0.046	9.6	5.001	5.479	8.1 km	–	catalog · MPC · JPL
(312609) 2009 RW_{55}	15 September 2009	Spacewatch	Kitt Peak	5.275	0.049	5.1	5.017	5.532	12 km	–	catalog · MPC · JPL
(312610) 2009 RA_{63}	12 September 2009	Spacewatch	Kitt Peak	5.182	0.077	4.5	4.784	5.579	11 km	–	catalog · MPC · JPL
(312611) 2009 RY_{68}	15 September 2009	Spacewatch	Kitt Peak	5.169	0.079	3.8	4.759	5.579	8.2 km	–	catalog · MPC · JPL
(312612) 2009 SE_{74}	17 September 2009	Spacewatch	Kitt Peak	5.141	0.036	6.8	4.958	5.323	10 km	–	catalog · MPC · JPL
(312614) 2009 SQ_{120}	18 September 2009	Spacewatch	Kitt Peak	5.244	0.087	12.4	4.789	5.700	11 km	–	catalog · MPC · JPL
(312615) 2009 SJ_{137}	18 September 2009	Spacewatch	Kitt Peak	5.161	0.146	6.0	4.410	5.912	8.6 km	–	catalog · MPC · JPL
(312616) 2009 SF_{141}	30 July 2008	Spacewatch	Kitt Peak	5.128	0.070	3.9	4.770	5.486	7.7 km	–	catalog · MPC · JPL
(312617) 2009 SZ_{199}	30 July 2008	Spacewatch	Kitt Peak	5.154	0.067	10.3	4.808	5.499	11 km	–	catalog · MPC · JPL
(312618) 2009 SQ_{246}	17 September 2009	Spacewatch	Kitt Peak	5.204	0.178	8.1	4.277	6.130	6.5 km	–	catalog · MPC · JPL
(312619) 2009 SS_{246}	30 November 2000	Sloan Digital Sky Survey	Apache Point	5.240	0.138	14.4	4.515	5.964	9.9 km	–	catalog · MPC · JPL
(312620) 2009 SA_{252}	21 September 2009	Spacewatch	Kitt Peak	5.313	0.098	6.2	4.792	5.834	8.2 km	–	catalog · MPC · JPL
(312621) 2009 SZ_{269}	24 September 2009	Spacewatch	Kitt Peak	5.108	0.079	8.6	4.704	5.513	8.7 km	–	catalog · MPC · JPL
(312622) 2009 SH_{313}	18 September 2009	Spacewatch	Kitt Peak	5.255	0.029	8.2	5.104	5.406	9.7 km	–	catalog · MPC · JPL
(312623) 2009 SQ_{346}	22 September 2009	Spacewatch	Kitt Peak	5.150	0.163	3.3	4.311	5.990	7.9 km	–	catalog · MPC · JPL
(312624) 2009 SB_{355}	6 September 2008	Spacewatch	Kitt Peak	5.186	0.143	5.7	4.443	5.928	8.4 km	–	catalog · MPC · JPL
(312625) 2009 SK_{356}	16 September 2009	Spacewatch	Kitt Peak	5.098	0.090	4.1	4.639	5.557	8.1 km	–	catalog · MPC · JPL
(312626) 2009 TU_{15}	1 October 2009	MLS	Mount Lemmon	5.292	0.104	9.5	4.740	5.845	16 km	–	catalog · MPC · JPL
(312627) 2009 TS_{26}	14 October 2009	OAM	La Sagra	5.231	0.171	7.3	4.336	6.127	12 km	–	catalog · MPC · JPL
(312628) 2009 UA_{36}	22 October 2009	MLS	Mount Lemmon	5.285	0.084	10.2	4.843	5.728	7.6 km	–	catalog · MPC · JPL
(312629) 2009 UB_{101}	23 October 2009	MLS	Mount Lemmon	5.289	0.030	4.7	5.130	5.448	9.0 km	–	catalog · MPC · JPL
(312630) 2009 UB_{107}	22 October 2009	MLS	Mount Lemmon	5.292	0.016	7.9	5.209	5.375	11 km	–	catalog · MPC · JPL
(312631) 2009 UR_{145}	21 October 2009	CSS	Catalina	5.279	0.144	22.5	4.519	6.038	17 km	–	catalog · MPC · JPL
(312632) 2009 UY_{148}	17 October 2009	MLS	Mount Lemmon	5.270	0.133	17.4	4.567	5.973	14 km	–	catalog · MPC · JPL
(312633) 2009 WE_{5}	16 November 2009	Spacewatch	Kitt Peak	5.221	0.059	13.4	4.913	5.529	12 km	–	catalog · MPC · JPL
(312634) 2009 WM_{59}	16 November 2009	MLS	Mount Lemmon	5.198	0.019	7.4	5.101	5.295	11 km	–	catalog · MPC · JPL
(312635) 2009 WC_{221}	16 November 2009	MLS	Mount Lemmon	5.190	0.014	3.6	5.118	5.261	8.3 km	–	catalog · MPC · JPL
(312636) 2009 WG_{229}	17 November 2009	MLS	Mount Lemmon	5.345	0.065	3.6	4.998	5.692	8.7 km	–	catalog · MPC · JPL
(312637) 2010 AP_{85}	2 October 2009	MLS	Mount Lemmon	5.176	0.134	17.5	4.485	5.867	9.5 km	–	catalog · MPC · JPL
(312638) 2010 AP_{111}	14 May 2004	Spacewatch	Kitt Peak	5.204	0.084	15.5	4.766	5.643	12 km	–	catalog · MPC · JPL
(312639) 2010 BX_{15}	15 September 2010	Spacewatch	Kitt Peak	5.166	0.105	18.6	4.625	5.706	11 km	–	catalog · MPC · JPL
(312640) 2010 BJ_{43}	26 October 2009	MLS	Mount Lemmon	5.108	0.053	11.4	4.837	5.380	11 km	–	catalog · MPC · JPL
(312641) 2010 BF_{52}	11 April 2002	NEAT	Palomar	5.223	0.155	17.2	4.413	6.032	15 km	–	catalog · MPC · JPL
(312642) 2010 BH_{62}	21 January 2010	WISE	WISE	5.172	0.047	10.8	4.926	5.417	12 km	–	catalog · MPC · JPL
(312643) 2010 BZ_{111}	9 October 2009	Spacewatch	Kitt Peak	5.238	0.048	17.1	4.986	5.490	14 km	–	catalog · MPC · JPL
(312700) 2010 OY_{75}	26 July 2010	WISE	WISE	5.136	0.157	14.7	4.332	5.941	10 km	–	catalog · MPC · JPL
(312707) 2010 PV_{25}	7 August 2010	WISE	WISE	5.172	0.063	17.9	4.845	5.499	16 km	–	catalog · MPC · JPL
(312716) 2010 RA_{31}	28 April 2004	Spacewatch	Kitt Peak	5.264	0.061	29.9	4.941	5.587	12 km	–	catalog · MPC · JPL
(312766) 2010 UW_{14}	20 May 2005	MLS	Mount Lemmon	5.228	0.019	17.1	5.130	5.326	13 km	–	catalog · MPC · JPL
(312770) 2010 UF_{56}	6 September 2008	MLS	Mount Lemmon	5.317	0.068	4.5	4.953	5.681	8.7 km	–	catalog · MPC · JPL
(312773) 2010 UW_{82}	12 January 2010	WISE	WISE	5.175	0.049	19.5	4.923	5.427	13 km	–	catalog · MPC · JPL
(312775) 2010 UP_{97}	26 March 2003	Spacewatch	Kitt Peak	5.123	0.025	9.8	4.997	5.249	11 km	–	catalog · MPC · JPL
(312778) 2010 VA_{30}	21 October 2009	CSS	Catalina	5.209	0.116	15.3	4.603	5.815	16 km	–	catalog · MPC · JPL
(312779) 2010 VY_{33}	29 July 2009	Spacewatch	Kitt Peak	5.218	0.186	24.4	4.247	6.189	13 km	–	catalog · MPC · JPL
(312782) 2010 VB_{46}	16 December 2007	MLS	Mount Lemmon	5.152	0.031	22.3	4.993	5.312	12 km	–	catalog · MPC · JPL
(312786) 2010 VC_{96}	2 October 2009	MLS	Mount Lemmon	5.275	0.055	13.2	4.985	5.565	12 km	–	catalog · MPC · JPL
(312787) 2010 VA_{114}	10 May 2005	MLS	Mount Lemmon	5.153	0.028	29.9	5.010	5.296	14 km	–	catalog · MPC · JPL
(312788) 2010 VF_{127}	22 June 1995	Spacewatch	Kitt Peak	5.250	0.152	8.7	4.453	6.047	11 km	–	catalog · MPC · JPL
(312791) 2010 VT_{164}	18 November 1998	M. W. Buie	Kitt Peak	5.195	0.085	2.1	4.756	5.635	8.9 km	–	catalog · MPC · JPL
(312793) 2010 VR_{180}	4 September 2008	Spacewatch	Kitt Peak	5.154	0.073	4.6	4.777	5.531	10 km	–	catalog · MPC · JPL
(312796) 2010 WQ_{21}	4 September 2008	Spacewatch	Kitt Peak	5.230	0.028	2.6	5.082	5.378	9.4 km	–	catalog · MPC · JPL
(312797) 2010 WC_{22}	27 September 2009	Spacewatch	Kitt Peak	5.279	0.096	5.2	4.770	5.788	8.6 km	–	catalog · MPC · JPL
(312798) 2010 WC_{27}	19 September 2009	Spacewatch	Kitt Peak	5.172	0.168	3.3	4.304	6.040	8.1 km	–	catalog · MPC · JPL
(312799) 2010 WF_{54}	21 June 2007	MLS	Mount Lemmon	5.167	0.101	6.7	4.645	5.688	10 km	–	catalog · MPC · JPL
(312801) 2010 WO_{66}	24 September 2008	MLS	Mount Lemmon	5.183	0.079	4.2	4.776	5.590	8.8 km	–	catalog · MPC · JPL
(312802) 2010 XM_{5}	5 January 2000	LINEAR	Socorro	5.189	0.045	22.6	4.954	5.424	21 km	–	catalog · MPC · JPL
(312803) 2010 XD_{71}	13 September 2007	MLS	Mount Lemmon	5.260	0.099	8.2	4.741	5.778	11 km	–	catalog · MPC · JPL
(312804) 2010 XQ_{79}	22 August 1995	Spacewatch	Kitt Peak	5.224	0.110	7.0	4.648	5.800	10 km	–	catalog · MPC · JPL
(312805) 2010 XN_{80}	11 April 2003	Spacewatch	Kitt Peak	5.288	0.059	7.5	4.976	5.600	10 km	–	catalog · MPC · JPL
(312806) 2010 XG_{85}	2 January 2001	Spacewatch	Kitt Peak	5.172	0.036	10.6	4.985	5.359	12 km	–	catalog · MPC · JPL
(312807) 2010 XM_{87}	4 October 1996	Spacewatch	Kitt Peak	5.210	0.047	8.5	4.963	5.457	11 km	–	catalog · MPC · JPL
(312948) 1995 SF_{80}	26 September 1995	Spacewatch	Kitt Peak	5.296	0.025	15.4	5.163	5.429	15 km	–	catalog · MPC · JPL
(312955) 1996 RB_{19}	15 September 1996	Spacewatch	Kitt Peak	5.192	0.071	6.1	4.826	5.559	8.1 km	–	catalog · MPC · JPL
(312961) 1997 SG_{30}	30 September 1997	Spacewatch	Kitt Peak	5.242	0.083	6.1	4.808	5.675	9.7 km	–	catalog · MPC · JPL
(312962) 1997 SM_{30}	30 September 1997	Spacewatch	Kitt Peak	5.205	0.214	4.8	4.091	6.319	7.7 km	–	catalog · MPC · JPL
(313022) 1999 YR_{12}	27 December 1999	Spacewatch	Kitt Peak	5.240	0.151	9.8	4.450	6.029	8.8 km	–	catalog · MPC · JPL
(313024) 2000 AV_{210}	5 January 2000	Spacewatch	Kitt Peak	5.198	0.085	8.8	4.755	5.641	11 km	–	catalog · MPC · JPL
(313142) 2001 DM_{2}	16 February 2001	Spacewatch	Kitt Peak	5.339	0.044	14.1	5.102	5.576	11 km	–	catalog · MPC · JPL
(313303) 2002 CU_{269}	7 February 2002	Spacewatch	Kitt Peak	5.154	0.043	14.8	4.931	5.378	13 km	–	catalog · MPC · JPL
(313323) 2002 EJ_{152}	15 March 2002	NEAT	Palomar	5.152	0.096	7.1	4.658	5.646	10 km	–	catalog · MPC · JPL
(313357) 2002 GU_{146}	13 April 2002	NEAT	Palomar	5.230	0.081	32.1	4.805	5.655	16 km	–	catalog · MPC · JPL
(313580) 2003 EM_{51}	11 March 2003	NEAT	Palomar	5.118	0.048	29.0	4.873	5.363	12 km	–	catalog · MPC · JPL
(313896) 2004 KY_{18}	21 May 2004	CINEOS	Campo Imperatore	5.330	0.093	16.0	4.834	5.827	15 km	–	catalog · MPC · JPL
(314191) 2005 JS_{119}	10 May 2005	Spacewatch	Kitt Peak	5.116	0.043	28.2	4.898	5.334	9.9 km	–	catalog · MPC · JPL
(314651) 2006 OC_{2}	18 July 2006	LUSS	Lulin	5.295	0.072	5.3	4.913	5.677	10 km	–	catalog · MPC · JPL
(315195) 2007 PM_{40}	13 August 2007	LINEAR	Socorro	5.249	0.091	17.9	4.773	5.724	16 km	–	catalog · MPC · JPL
(315203) 2007 QK_{15}	24 August 2007	Spacewatch	Kitt Peak	5.226	0.015	13.6	5.145	5.307	9.3 km	–	catalog · MPC · JPL
(315204) 2007 QM_{15}	24 August 2007	Spacewatch	Kitt Peak	5.369	0.017	6.0	5.275	5.462	9.9 km	–	catalog · MPC · JPL
(315205) 2007 QO_{15}	24 August 2007	Spacewatch	Kitt Peak	5.232	0.025	8.2	5.102	5.363	9.3 km	–	catalog · MPC · JPL
(315208) 2007 RS_{22}	3 September 2007	CSS	Catalina	5.242	0.041	13.6	5.030	5.455	13 km	–	catalog · MPC · JPL
(315224) 2007 RR_{154}	10 September 2007	MLS	Mount Lemmon	5.184	0.066	4.5	4.842	5.526	9.8 km	–	catalog · MPC · JPL
(315368) 2007 VX_{2}	2 November 2007	MLS	Mount Lemmon	5.191	0.110	14.5	4.620	5.763	11 km	–	catalog · MPC · JPL
(315369) 2007 VG_{6}	3 November 2007	MLS	Mount Lemmon	5.213	0.091	12.6	4.737	5.689	12 km	–	catalog · MPC · JPL
(315901) 2008 QY_{36}	21 August 2008	Spacewatch	Kitt Peak	5.106	0.086	3.5	4.669	5.543	7.6 km	–	catalog · MPC · JPL
(315902) 2008 QS_{40}	24 August 2008	Spacewatch	Kitt Peak	5.279	0.083	4.2	4.841	5.717	9.2 km	–	catalog · MPC · JPL
(315903) 2008 QJ_{42}	24 August 2008	Spacewatch	Kitt Peak	5.289	0.098	18.5	4.770	5.807	11 km	–	catalog · MPC · JPL
(315905) 2008 RC_{2}	2 September 2008	Spacewatch	Kitt Peak	5.194	0.070	9.5	4.831	5.557	8.6 km	–	catalog · MPC · JPL
(315906) 2008 RD_{4}	2 September 2008	Spacewatch	Kitt Peak	5.207	0.158	6.2	4.382	6.031	8.4 km	–	catalog · MPC · JPL
(315907) 2008 RF_{20}	4 September 2008	Spacewatch	Kitt Peak	5.170	0.098	6.6	4.664	5.676	9.3 km	–	catalog · MPC · JPL
(315909) 2008 RO_{63}	13 February 2002	Spacewatch	Kitt Peak	5.158	0.108	4.3	4.603	5.712	9.0 km	–	catalog · MPC · JPL
(315910) 2008 RH_{64}	4 September 2008	Spacewatch	Kitt Peak	5.108	0.046	9.6	4.872	5.344	13 km	–	catalog · MPC · JPL
(315911) 2008 RH_{67}	4 September 2008	Spacewatch	Kitt Peak	5.201	0.117	9.9	4.595	5.807	13 km	–	catalog · MPC · JPL
(315913) 2008 RP_{109}	2 September 2008	Spacewatch	Kitt Peak	5.110	0.037	2.3	4.922	5.298	7.2 km	–	catalog · MPC · JPL
(315914) 2008 RE_{113}	5 September 2008	Spacewatch	Kitt Peak	5.242	0.022	5.2	5.124	5.359	8.5 km	–	catalog · MPC · JPL
(315915) 2008 RB_{123}	5 September 2008	Spacewatch	Kitt Peak	5.149	0.047	6.0	4.910	5.389	9.1 km	–	catalog · MPC · JPL
(315916) 2008 RO_{124}	6 September 2008	MLS	Mount Lemmon	5.249	0.121	6.6	4.611	5.886	9.8 km	–	catalog · MPC · JPL
(315917) 2008 RO_{125}	7 September 2008	MLS	Mount Lemmon	5.165	0.090	2.8	4.699	5.630	7.0 km	–	catalog · MPC · JPL
(315918) 2008 RT_{126}	4 September 2008	Spacewatch	Kitt Peak	5.221	0.011	6.4	5.162	5.279	8.5 km	–	catalog · MPC · JPL
(315919) 2008 RG_{127}	6 September 2008	Spacewatch	Kitt Peak	5.228	0.146	3.0	4.465	5.991	9.2 km	–	catalog · MPC · JPL
(315921) 2008 SL_{23}	19 September 2008	Spacewatch	Kitt Peak	5.237	0.117	12.4	4.623	5.851	9.0 km	–	catalog · MPC · JPL
(315922) 2008 SW_{28}	19 September 2008	Spacewatch	Kitt Peak	5.352	0.090	4.8	4.871	5.833	8.9 km	–	catalog · MPC · JPL
(315923) 2008 SM_{39}	20 September 2008	Spacewatch	Kitt Peak	5.230	0.069	9.8	4.868	5.593	12 km	–	catalog · MPC · JPL
(315925) 2008 SE_{96}	21 September 2008	Spacewatch	Kitt Peak	5.278	0.013	6.4	5.207	5.348	9.1 km	–	catalog · MPC · JPL
(315926) 2008 SW_{149}	29 September 2008	F. Kugel	Dauban	5.368	0.096	10.5	4.855	5.882	11 km	–	catalog · MPC · JPL
(315928) 2008 SP_{198}	25 September 2008	W. Bickel	Bergisch Gladbach	5.313	0.052	9.5	5.036	5.590	10 km	–	catalog · MPC · JPL
(315931) 2008 SY_{233}	28 September 2008	MLS	Mount Lemmon	5.367	0.057	7.0	5.060	5.674	9.9 km	–	catalog · MPC · JPL
(315932) 2008 SX_{274}	22 September 2008	Spacewatch	Kitt Peak	5.280	0.062	5.0	4.952	5.607	9.8 km	–	catalog · MPC · JPL
(315933) 2008 SR_{275}	23 September 2008	Spacewatch	Kitt Peak	5.142	0.050	7.7	4.886	5.397	9.8 km	–	catalog · MPC · JPL
(315934) 2008 SV_{279}	24 September 2008	MLS	Mount Lemmon	5.160	0.122	5.2	4.531	5.789	11 km	–	catalog · MPC · JPL
(315935) 2008 TK_{15}	1 October 2008	MLS	Mount Lemmon	5.159	0.072	2.2	4.788	5.531	6.5 km	–	catalog · MPC · JPL
(315936) 2008 TD_{29}	1 October 2008	MLS	Mount Lemmon	5.236	0.069	9.6	4.874	5.598	15 km	–	catalog · MPC · JPL
(315937) 2008 TE_{49}	2 October 2008	Spacewatch	Kitt Peak	5.221	0.090	6.0	4.751	5.691	7.8 km	–	catalog · MPC · JPL
(315938) 2008 TV_{49}	2 October 2008	Spacewatch	Kitt Peak	5.219	0.071	4.3	4.848	5.589	9.7 km	–	catalog · MPC · JPL
(315939) 2008 TN_{59}	2 October 2008	Spacewatch	Kitt Peak	5.206	0.047	4.2	4.960	5.451	7.6 km	–	catalog · MPC · JPL
(315940) 2008 TJ_{85}	3 October 2008	MLS	Mount Lemmon	5.225	0.034	6.0	5.047	5.403	11 km	–	catalog · MPC · JPL
(315941) 2008 TE_{91}	3 October 2008	OAM	La Sagra	5.245	0.172	2.3	4.346	6.145	8.1 km	–	catalog · MPC · JPL
(315942) 2008 TG_{101}	6 October 2008	Spacewatch	Kitt Peak	5.236	0.061	12.3	4.915	5.557	10 km	–	catalog · MPC · JPL
(315943) 2008 TY_{116}	6 October 2008	MLS	Mount Lemmon	5.328	0.034	11.3	5.144	5.512	8.9 km	–	catalog · MPC · JPL
(315944) 2008 TN_{118}	7 October 2008	Spacewatch	Kitt Peak	5.250	0.018	7.8	5.158	5.342	9.9 km	–	catalog · MPC · JPL
(315945) 2008 TR_{118}	7 October 2008	Spacewatch	Kitt Peak	5.188	0.030	7.8	5.034	5.341	8.3 km	–	catalog · MPC · JPL
(315948) 2008 TL_{125}	8 October 2008	MLS	Mount Lemmon	5.300	0.064	3.9	4.959	5.641	9.1 km	–	catalog · MPC · JPL
(315949) 2008 TJ_{126}	8 October 2008	MLS	Mount Lemmon	5.188	0.035	6.1	5.008	5.368	12 km	–	catalog · MPC · JPL
(315950) 2008 TT_{127}	8 October 2008	MLS	Mount Lemmon	5.271	0.073	6.1	4.884	5.658	9.4 km	–	catalog · MPC · JPL
(315951) 2008 TL_{144}	9 October 2008	MLS	Mount Lemmon	5.366	0.088	1.4	4.894	5.837	7.3 km	–	catalog · MPC · JPL
(315952) 2008 TO_{148}	9 October 2008	MLS	Mount Lemmon	5.205	0.057	5.1	4.908	5.503	9.7 km	–	catalog · MPC · JPL
(315953) 2008 TK_{150}	9 October 2008	MLS	Mount Lemmon	5.175	0.034	2.6	4.997	5.353	8.0 km	–	catalog · MPC · JPL
(315954) 2008 TJ_{176}	7 October 2008	Spacewatch	Kitt Peak	5.251	0.031	6.9	5.086	5.416	9.5 km	–	catalog · MPC · JPL
(315956) 2008 UJ_{9}	24 September 2008	Spacewatch	Kitt Peak	5.257	0.029	10.3	5.106	5.407	10 km	–	catalog · MPC · JPL
(315957) 2008 UO_{9}	17 October 2008	Spacewatch	Kitt Peak	5.251	0.072	5.2	4.872	5.631	11 km	–	catalog · MPC · JPL
(315958) 2008 UR_{59}	21 October 2008	MLS	Mount Lemmon	5.266	0.145	12.5	4.503	6.029	9.9 km	–	catalog · MPC · JPL
(315960) 2008 UB_{190}	25 October 2008	MLS	Mount Lemmon	5.187	0.124	3.3	4.546	5.828	8.9 km	–	catalog · MPC · JPL
(315964) 2008 WH_{17}	17 November 2008	Spacewatch	Kitt Peak	5.176	0.040	2.6	4.970	5.382	8.7 km	–	catalog · MPC · JPL
(316119) 2009 QL_{26}	20 August 2009	Osservatorio Cima Rest	Magasa	5.172	0.128	31.3	4.512	5.833	11 km	–	catalog · MPC · JPL
(316127) 2009 RY_{34}	14 September 2009	Spacewatch	Kitt Peak	5.249	0.059	1.2	4.941	5.557	7.4 km	–	catalog · MPC · JPL
(316128) 2009 RB_{57}	15 September 2009	Spacewatch	Kitt Peak	5.227	0.122	4.0	4.590	5.864	8.8 km	–	catalog · MPC · JPL
(316129) 2009 RH_{64}	15 September 2009	Spacewatch	Kitt Peak	5.282	0.099	4.5	4.761	5.804	8.1 km	–	catalog · MPC · JPL
(316130) 2009 RA_{74}	15 September 2009	Spacewatch	Kitt Peak	5.158	0.094	8.2	4.675	5.641	10 km	–	catalog · MPC · JPL
(316132) 2009 SO_{19}	22 September 2009	S. Karge; R. Kling	Taunus	5.170	0.147	8.9	4.410	5.929	8.3 km	–	catalog · MPC · JPL
(316133) 2009 SX_{33}	25 October 1997	ODAS	Caussols	5.275	0.156	5.2	4.452	6.097	9.8 km	–	catalog · MPC · JPL
(316134) 2009 SV_{43}	16 September 2009	Spacewatch	Kitt Peak	5.122	0.047	5.5	4.880	5.363	8.9 km	–	catalog · MPC · JPL
(316135) 2009 SX_{65}	17 September 2009	Spacewatch	Kitt Peak	5.229	0.100	3.1	4.708	5.750	7.7 km	–	catalog · MPC · JPL
(316137) 2009 SM_{131}	18 September 2009	Spacewatch	Kitt Peak	5.270	0.120	5.1	4.637	5.903	8.2 km	–	catalog · MPC · JPL
(316141) 2009 SM_{248}	16 September 2009	Spacewatch	Kitt Peak	5.206	0.099	24.7	4.690	5.723	12 km	–	catalog · MPC · JPL
(316144) 2009 SD_{304}	16 September 2009	Spacewatch	Kitt Peak	5.158	0.085	5.6	4.720	5.596	10 km	–	catalog · MPC · JPL
(316146) 2009 SV_{347}	16 September 2009	Spacewatch	Kitt Peak	5.118	0.083	1.6	4.695	5.542	8.6 km	–	catalog · MPC · JPL
(316147) 2009 SM_{348}	16 September 2009	MLS	Mount Lemmon	5.204	0.065	13.9	4.864	5.544	11 km	–	catalog · MPC · JPL
(316148) 2009 SK_{352}	22 September 2009	MLS	Mount Lemmon	5.328	0.035	2.3	5.141	5.515	8.5 km	–	catalog · MPC · JPL
(316149) 2009 ST_{355}	25 September 2009	Spacewatch	Kitt Peak	5.343	0.063	8.7	5.007	5.679	10 km	–	catalog · MPC · JPL
(316150) 2009 SW_{355}	29 September 2009	MLS	Mount Lemmon	5.222	0.146	8.1	4.462	5.983	9.2 km	–	catalog · MPC · JPL
(316152) 2009 SV_{361}	30 September 2009	MLS	Mount Lemmon	5.214	0.153	14.4	4.416	6.012	11 km	–	catalog · MPC · JPL
(316153) 2009 TZ_{24}	14 October 2009	CSS	Catalina	5.191	0.078	9.6	4.785	5.597	10 km	–	catalog · MPC · JPL
(316155) 2009 TW_{41}	15 October 2009	OAM	La Sagra	5.201	0.077	9.8	4.802	5.601	11 km	–	catalog · MPC · JPL
(316156) 2009 UW_{4}	18 October 2009	BATTeRS	Bisei SG Center	5.160	0.090	10.6	4.695	5.626	9.6 km	–	catalog · MPC · JPL
(316157) 2009 UT_{13}	18 October 2009	Spacewatch	Kitt Peak	5.280	0.082	6.1	4.849	5.711	8.5 km	–	catalog · MPC · JPL
(316158) 2009 UW_{26}	21 October 2009	CSS	Catalina	5.231	0.087	27.7	4.774	5.688	17 km	–	catalog · MPC · JPL
(316159) 2009 UH_{29}	18 October 2009	MLS	Mount Lemmon	5.206	0.032	6.2	5.040	5.372	8.2 km	–	catalog · MPC · JPL
(316160) 2009 UW_{51}	24 August 2008	Spacewatch	Kitt Peak	5.337	0.089	4.5	4.861	5.813	8.4 km	–	catalog · MPC · JPL
(316161) 2009 UT_{76}	25 April 2003	Spacewatch	Kitt Peak	5.197	0.120	6.4	4.573	5.822	11 km	–	catalog · MPC · JPL
(316162) 2009 UE_{108}	23 October 2009	Spacewatch	Kitt Peak	5.236	0.103	8.9	4.699	5.773	9.9 km	–	catalog · MPC · JPL
(316163) 2009 VE_{46}	9 November 2009	Spacewatch	Kitt Peak	5.233	0.070	2.4	4.868	5.598	7.8 km	–	catalog · MPC · JPL
(316164) 2009 VM_{71}	10 November 2009	Spacewatch	Kitt Peak	5.291	0.083	6.9	4.851	5.730	7.2 km	–	catalog · MPC · JPL
(316165) 2009 VP_{110}	31 March 2003	Spacewatch	Kitt Peak	5.211	0.077	8.7	4.810	5.612	14 km	–	catalog · MPC · JPL
(316166) 2009 WQ_{1}	16 November 2009	Spacewatch	Kitt Peak	5.283	0.092	4.8	4.795	5.770	7.5 km	–	catalog · MPC · JPL
(316168) 2009 WA_{57}	16 November 2009	MLS	Mount Lemmon	5.265	0.065	3.8	4.922	5.608	8.1 km	–	catalog · MPC · JPL
(316169) 2009 WQ_{96}	22 September 2008	Spacewatch	Kitt Peak	5.351	0.041	2.7	5.132	5.570	7.9 km	–	catalog · MPC · JPL
(316170) 2009 WV_{149}	19 November 2009	MLS	Mount Lemmon	5.237	0.057	15.6	4.938	5.536	15 km	–	catalog · MPC · JPL
(316173) 2009 WB_{240}	17 November 2009	CSS	Catalina	5.311	0.088	15.4	4.845	5.777	11 km	–	catalog · MPC · JPL
(316174) 2009 WM_{250}	23 November 2009	MLS	Mount Lemmon	5.223	0.091	8.4	4.745	5.701	11 km	–	catalog · MPC · JPL
(316175) 2010 BM_{33}	13 February 2002	Spacewatch	Kitt Peak	5.173	0.073	11.8	4.796	5.551	14 km	–	catalog · MPC · JPL
(316176) 2010 BB_{46}	27 October 2009	MLS	Mount Lemmon	5.270	0.082	13.3	4.835	5.704	10 km	–	catalog · MPC · JPL
(316177) 2010 BW_{70}	14 May 2004	Spacewatch	Kitt Peak	5.151	0.013	11.8	5.084	5.218	15 km	–	catalog · MPC · JPL
(316267) 2010 PW_{25}	7 August 2010	WISE	WISE	5.159	0.096	8.6	4.664	5.654	12 km	–	catalog · MPC · JPL
(316431) 2010 TH_{167}	14 October 2010	LINEAR	Socorro	5.120	0.093	29.5	4.646	5.594	12 km	–	catalog · MPC · JPL
(316446) 2010 UT_{53}	13 February 2002	Sloan Digital Sky Survey	Apache Point	5.102	0.085	6.3	4.670	5.534	8.6 km	–	catalog · MPC · JPL
(316461) 2010 UQ_{91}	3 September 2008	Spacewatch	Kitt Peak	5.177	0.075	7.8	4.787	5.566	8.0 km	–	catalog · MPC · JPL
(316484) 2010 VM_{61}	4 November 2010	OAM	La Sagra	5.131	0.051	6.0	4.868	5.394	13 km	–	catalog · MPC · JPL
(316508) 2010 VD_{144}	2 May 2003	Spacewatch	Kitt Peak	5.175	0.098	10.7	4.669	5.681	12 km	–	catalog · MPC · JPL
(316528) 2010 VC_{202}	18 March 2004	Spacewatch	Kitt Peak	5.199	0.027	14.7	5.059	5.339	12 km	–	catalog · MPC · JPL
(316536) 2010 WT_{35}	27 November 1998	Spacewatch	Kitt Peak	5.204	0.123	3.0	4.565	5.842	6.8 km	–	catalog · MPC · JPL
(316537) 2010 WP_{58}	27 September 2009	MLS	Mount Lemmon	5.248	0.054	10.2	4.966	5.529	10 km	–	catalog · MPC · JPL
(316538) 2010 WG_{67}	2 November 2010	Spacewatch	Kitt Peak	5.172	0.080	12.6	4.760	5.585	12 km	–	catalog · MPC · JPL
(316550) 2010 XE_{81}	17 January 2010	WISE	WISE	5.175	0.067	21.2	4.829	5.520	14 km	–	catalog · MPC · JPL
(316551) 2010 XA_{84}	24 August 2008	Spacewatch	Kitt Peak	5.196	0.064	7.2	4.862	5.530	8.5 km	–	catalog · MPC · JPL
(316552) 2010 XF_{87}	7 April 2003	Spacewatch	Kitt Peak	5.211	0.033	8.5	5.039	5.382	9.7 km	–	catalog · MPC · JPL
(316553) 2010 YT_{1}	14 October 2009	OAM	La Sagra	5.297	0.069	15.4	4.929	5.665	14 km	–	catalog · MPC · JPL
(316617) 2011 WJ_{46}	16 September 2009	CSS	Catalina	5.144	0.057	11.0	4.852	5.435	13 km	–	catalog · MPC · JPL
(316624) 2011 WM_{88}	20 January 2001	NEAT	Haleakala	5.207	0.058	13.6	4.904	5.510	16 km	–	catalog · MPC · JPL
(316626) 2011 WT_{90}	16 October 1998	Spacewatch	Kitt Peak	5.161	0.048	5.0	4.913	5.410	10 km	–	catalog · MPC · JPL
(316629) 2011 WR_{113}	19 June 2007	Spacewatch	Kitt Peak	5.130	0.049	8.5	4.877	5.383	14 km	–	catalog · MPC · JPL
(316833) 2000 BC_{52}	27 January 2000	Spacewatch	Kitt Peak	5.169	0.072	13.2	4.799	5.538	9.2 km	–	catalog · MPC · JPL
(316835) 2000 CB_{101}	28 January 2000	Spacewatch	Kitt Peak	5.330	0.052	8.6	5.052	5.609	10 km	–	catalog · MPC · JPL
(317287) 2002 FR_{36}	22 March 2002	NEAT	Palomar	5.246	0.057	22.2	4.946	5.546	14 km	–	catalog · MPC · JPL
(317316) 2002 GJ_{188}	21 February 2001	Spacewatch	Kitt Peak	5.143	0.057	7.5	4.849	5.436	9.6 km	–	catalog · MPC · JPL
(317668) 2003 GA_{38}	8 April 2003	Spacewatch	Kitt Peak	5.312	0.016	13.6	5.228	5.396	11 km	–	catalog · MPC · JPL
(318101) 2004 HY_{40}	19 April 2004	Spacewatch	Kitt Peak	5.123	0.072	23.2	4.752	5.494	12 km	–	catalog · MPC · JPL
(318634) 2005 LG_{7}	1 June 2005	Spacewatch	Kitt Peak	5.151	0.038	26.5	4.954	5.348	14 km	–	catalog · MPC · JPL
(318641) 2005 LZ_{38}	11 June 2005	Spacewatch	Kitt Peak	5.174	0.026	12.7	5.041	5.307	11 km	–	catalog · MPC · JPL
(320286) 2007 RR_{188}	10 September 2007	Spacewatch	Kitt Peak	5.224	0.055	5.7	4.939	5.510	7.3 km	–	catalog · MPC · JPL
(320302) 2007 RC_{308}	13 September 2007	MLS	Mount Lemmon	5.167	0.103	26.3	4.633	5.701	12 km	–	catalog · MPC · JPL
(321067) 2008 SJ_{56}	20 September 2008	MLS	Mount Lemmon	5.220	0.059	17.9	4.912	5.527	10 km	–	catalog · MPC · JPL
(321070) 2008 SM_{58}	20 September 2008	Spacewatch	Kitt Peak	5.206	0.008	8.5	5.164	5.249	9.0 km	–	catalog · MPC · JPL
(321074) 2008 SP_{67}	21 September 2008	Spacewatch	Kitt Peak	5.252	0.048	11.7	5.001	5.503	13 km	–	catalog · MPC · JPL
(321078) 2008 SY_{91}	21 September 2008	Spacewatch	Kitt Peak	5.282	0.063	24.5	4.948	5.617	11 km	–	catalog · MPC · JPL
(321082) 2008 SM_{121}	22 September 2008	MLS	Mount Lemmon	5.260	0.061	3.6	4.942	5.579	8.8 km	–	catalog · MPC · JPL
(321086) 2008 SX_{165}	28 September 2008	LINEAR	Socorro	5.212	0.142	8.8	4.474	5.951	9.6 km	–	catalog · MPC · JPL
(321091) 2008 SX_{224}	26 September 2008	Spacewatch	Kitt Peak	5.194	0.040	3.5	4.985	5.404	8.3 km	–	catalog · MPC · JPL
(321095) 2008 SA_{277}	3 September 2008	Spacewatch	Kitt Peak	5.280	0.079	7.8	4.862	5.699	8.3 km	–	catalog · MPC · JPL
(321103) 2008 TL_{57}	2 October 2008	Spacewatch	Kitt Peak	5.251	0.066	1.4	4.903	5.598	6.4 km	–	catalog · MPC · JPL
(321112) 2008 TV_{124}	8 October 2008	MLS	Mount Lemmon	5.275	0.048	14.7	5.021	5.529	13 km	–	catalog · MPC · JPL
(321113) 2008 TQ_{131}	8 October 2008	MLS	Mount Lemmon	5.233	0.011	6.7	5.174	5.292	11 km	–	catalog · MPC · JPL
(321115) 2008 TB_{142}	9 October 2008	MLS	Mount Lemmon	5.233	0.098	7.5	4.718	5.747	11 km	–	catalog · MPC · JPL
(321120) 2008 UL_{11}	1 April 2003	M. W. Buie	Kitt Peak	5.130	0.062	2.4	4.809	5.450	8.7 km	–	catalog · MPC · JPL
(321138) 2008 UY_{152}	23 October 2008	MLS	Mount Lemmon	5.254	0.041	8.3	5.037	5.470	10 km	–	catalog · MPC · JPL
(321150) 2008 UW_{301}	29 September 2008	MLS	Mount Lemmon	5.259	0.056	8.3	4.964	5.554	7.9 km	–	catalog · MPC · JPL
(321377) 2009 OQ_{15}	27 July 2009	Spacewatch	Kitt Peak	5.190	0.077	13.4	4.789	5.592	15 km	–	catalog · MPC · JPL
(321406) 2009 QA_{1}	17 August 2009	Spacewatch	Kitt Peak	5.194	0.089	23.6	4.730	5.658	12 km	–	catalog · MPC · JPL
(321435) 2009 QM_{44}	1 April 2003	Sloan Digital Sky Survey	Apache Point	5.210	0.133	13.5	4.518	5.903	13 km	–	catalog · MPC · JPL
(321513) 2009 SG_{193}	6 September 2008	Spacewatch	Kitt Peak	5.209	0.064	8.3	4.876	5.542	12 km	–	catalog · MPC · JPL
(321526) 2009 ST_{235}	18 September 2009	Spacewatch	Kitt Peak	5.158	0.088	11.2	4.706	5.609	9.7 km	–	catalog · MPC · JPL
(321570) 2009 SE_{361}	13 September 1996	Uppsala-DLR Trojan Survey	La Silla	5.213	0.015	19.2	5.133	5.294	14 km	–	catalog · MPC · JPL
(321580) 2009 TF_{46}	11 October 2009	MLS	Mount Lemmon	5.276	0.141	6.7	4.531	6.021	8.3 km	–	catalog · MPC · JPL
(321584) 2009 UG_{21}	23 October 2009	P. Kocher	Marly	5.112	0.062	10.6	4.798	5.426	10 km	–	catalog · MPC · JPL
(321590) 2009 UE_{72}	23 October 2009	MLS	Mount Lemmon	5.197	0.081	14.6	4.776	5.618	13 km	–	catalog · MPC · JPL
(321597) 2009 UZ_{126}	22 October 2009	CSS	Catalina	5.217	0.103	24.8	4.678	5.757	12 km	–	catalog · MPC · JPL
(321599) 2009 UJ_{140}	18 October 2009	MLS	Mount Lemmon	5.273	0.061	1.7	4.952	5.594	7.1 km	–	catalog · MPC · JPL
(321603) 2009 US_{148}	23 October 2009	Spacewatch	Kitt Peak	5.106	0.055	4.9	4.825	5.388	9.5 km	–	catalog · MPC · JPL
(321604) 2009 VV_{2}	23 August 2007	Spacewatch	Kitt Peak	5.269	0.099	20.6	4.747	5.790	12 km	–	catalog · MPC · JPL
(321610) 2009 VG_{50}	14 October 2009	MLS	Mount Lemmon	5.229	0.123	8.2	4.587	5.871	10 km	–	catalog · MPC · JPL
(321611) 2009 VG_{58}	26 October 2009	Spacewatch	Kitt Peak	5.203	0.059	26.9	4.894	5.512	16 km	–	catalog · MPC · JPL
(321613) 2009 VA_{86}	10 November 2009	Spacewatch	Kitt Peak	5.267	0.076	2.7	4.867	5.667	12 km	–	catalog · MPC · JPL
(321616) 2009 VR_{107}	8 November 2009	MLS	Mount Lemmon	5.315	0.080	6.5	4.893	5.738	11 km	–	catalog · MPC · JPL
(321625) 2009 WR_{99}	21 November 2009	Spacewatch	Kitt Peak	5.330	0.106	3.3	4.767	5.894	9.3 km	–	catalog · MPC · JPL
(321627) 2009 WB_{102}	2 October 2008	Spacewatch	Kitt Peak	5.126	0.085	6.3	4.692	5.560	7.4 km	–	catalog · MPC · JPL
(321628) 2009 WV_{107}	17 November 2009	MLS	Mount Lemmon	5.265	0.074	2.7	4.877	5.652	7.9 km	–	catalog · MPC · JPL
(321631) 2009 WU_{167}	8 October 2008	Spacewatch	Kitt Peak	5.202	0.057	2.3	4.907	5.497	7.9 km	–	catalog · MPC · JPL
(321651) 2010 BY_{9}	14 February 2002	Spacewatch	Kitt Peak	5.149	0.097	6.8	4.651	5.647	10 km	–	catalog · MPC · JPL
(321652) 2010 BV_{47}	9 March 2002	Spacewatch	Kitt Peak	5.209	0.057	12.1	4.912	5.507	14 km	–	catalog · MPC · JPL
(321653) 2010 BP_{59}	27 October 2009	MLS	Mount Lemmon	5.215	0.130	10.8	4.538	5.892	8.7 km	–	catalog · MPC · JPL
(321656) 2010 BM_{90}	2 October 2009	MLS	Mount Lemmon	5.115	0.056	12.5	4.830	5.399	10 km	–	catalog · MPC · JPL
(321657) 2010 BM_{117}	10 April 2002	NEAT	Palomar	5.218	0.086	23.8	4.772	5.665	16 km	–	catalog · MPC · JPL
(321674) 2010 CU_{240}	22 September 2008	CSS	Catalina	5.213	0.155	12.5	4.405	6.021	11 km	–	catalog · MPC · JPL
(321676) 2010 DN_{30}	27 August 2006	Spacewatch	Kitt Peak	5.242	0.033	13.6	5.068	5.417	13 km	–	catalog · MPC · JPL
(321986) 2010 US_{58}	28 August 1995	Spacewatch	Kitt Peak	5.231	0.023	6.9	5.110	5.353	8.7 km	–	catalog · MPC · JPL
(321987) 2010 UT_{58}	4 September 2010	Spacewatch	Kitt Peak	5.159	0.060	12.6	4.849	5.470	11 km	–	catalog · MPC · JPL
(322058) 2010 VX_{78}	30 September 2010	MLS	Mount Lemmon	5.115	0.059	12.8	4.814	5.417	11 km	–	catalog · MPC · JPL
(322068) 2010 VK_{98}	10 June 2005	Spacewatch	Kitt Peak	5.213	0.065	3.7	4.875	5.551	12 km	–	catalog · MPC · JPL
(322071) 2010 VU_{107}	6 November 2010	LINEAR	Socorro	5.210	0.112	9.0	4.626	5.794	12 km	–	catalog · MPC · JPL
(322080) 2010 VP_{117}	6 September 2008	MLS	Mount Lemmon	5.178	0.064	7.0	4.849	5.507	7.3 km	–	catalog · MPC · JPL
(322137) 2010 VV_{192}	5 September 2008	Spacewatch	Kitt Peak	5.215	0.088	8.2	4.756	5.674	11 km	–	catalog · MPC · JPL
(322157) 2010 WC_{61}	27 September 2009	MLS	Mount Lemmon	5.252	0.129	13.8	4.574	5.930	9.3 km	–	catalog · MPC · JPL
(322167) 2010 XA_{13}	3 November 2010	MLS	Mount Lemmon	5.108	0.047	12.1	4.869	5.347	11 km	–	catalog · MPC · JPL
(322171) 2010 XG_{21}	12 February 2002	Spacewatch	Kitt Peak	5.227	0.056	8.2	4.936	5.518	11 km	–	catalog · MPC · JPL
(322194) 2010 XW_{76}	23 November 2009	CSS	Catalina	5.173	0.112	8.6	4.596	5.750	9.6 km	–	catalog · MPC · JPL
(322196) 2010 XV_{78}	6 November 2010	MLS	Mount Lemmon	5.238	0.032	10.1	5.070	5.406	12 km	–	catalog · MPC · JPL
(322316) 2011 GG	27 January 2010	WISE	WISE	5.166	0.079	19.9	4.757	5.575	12 km	–	catalog · MPC · JPL
(322519) 2011 YJ_{4}	17 June 2006	Spacewatch	Kitt Peak	5.205	0.032	10.2	5.039	5.372	12 km	–	catalog · MPC · JPL
(322520) 2011 YD_{8}	26 October 2009	MLS	Mount Lemmon	5.175	0.037	11.9	4.986	5.365	10 km	–	catalog · MPC · JPL
(322524) 2011 YS_{14}	18 March 2004	Spacewatch	Kitt Peak	5.277	0.076	13.1	4.873	5.680	13 km	–	catalog · MPC · JPL
(322525) 2011 YK_{15}	28 September 2008	CSS	Catalina	5.180	0.055	15.5	4.893	5.467	11 km	–	catalog · MPC · JPL
(322538) 2011 YN_{27}	20 May 2004	Spacewatch	Kitt Peak	5.280	0.065	5.9	4.938	5.622	11 km	–	catalog · MPC · JPL
(322540) 2011 YR_{29}	15 September 2007	R. Ferrando	Pla D'Arguines	5.286	0.013	6.1	5.220	5.353	11 km	–	catalog · MPC · JPL
(322546) 2011 YP_{35}	17 September 2009	MLS	Mount Lemmon	5.174	0.099	5.4	4.660	5.689	10 km	–	catalog · MPC · JPL
(322550) 2011 YT_{45}	10 October 2008	MLS	Mount Lemmon	5.235	0.058	6.2	4.931	5.539	8.0 km	–	catalog · MPC · JPL
(322553) 2011 YQ_{50}	3 October 2008	MLS	Mount Lemmon	5.345	0.042	6.3	5.123	5.568	11 km	–	catalog · MPC · JPL
(322555) 2011 YQ_{53}	19 September 2007	Spacewatch	Kitt Peak	5.240	0.059	6.4	4.931	5.549	8.2 km	–	catalog · MPC · JPL
(322560) 2011 YK_{58}	16 January 2010	WISE	WISE	5.228	0.130	16.4	4.548	5.909	9.3 km	–	catalog · MPC · JPL
(322568) 2011 YF_{64}	31 March 2003	Sloan Digital Sky Survey	Apache Point	5.160	0.120	22.8	4.540	5.779	9.6 km	–	catalog · MPC · JPL
(322569) 2011 YQ_{65}	14 September 2007	P. A. Wiegert	Mauna Kea	5.201	0.065	11.7	4.861	5.541	9.6 km	–	catalog · MPC · JPL
(322570) 2011 YG_{67}	31 March 2003	Sloan Digital Sky Survey	Apache Point	5.187	0.075	21.6	4.800	5.573	13 km	–	catalog · MPC · JPL
(322571) 2011 YO_{73}	3 September 2008	Spacewatch	Kitt Peak	5.277	0.072	3.8	4.896	5.659	8.0 km	–	catalog · MPC · JPL
(322584) 2012 BV	14 September 2007	MLS	Mount Lemmon	5.151	0.172	16.1	4.266	6.036	12 km	–	catalog · MPC · JPL
(322605) 2012 BO_{96}	2 February 2001	Spacewatch	Kitt Peak	5.301	0.041	17.5	5.084	5.517	12 km	–	catalog · MPC · JPL
(325374) 2008 RR_{85}	5 September 2008	Spacewatch	Kitt Peak	5.287	0.034	18.3	5.107	5.467	11 km	–	catalog · MPC · JPL
(325641) 2009 SW_{307}	29 September 2008	MLS	Mount Lemmon	5.168	0.058	5.6	4.868	5.467	8.7 km	–	catalog · MPC · JPL
(325679) 2009 TH_{27}	1 October 2009	MLS	Mount Lemmon	5.114	0.049	25.5	4.862	5.365	14 km	–	catalog · MPC · JPL
(325695) 2009 UF_{23}	17 October 2009	OAM	La Sagra	5.270	0.082	7.9	4.836	5.703	12 km	–	catalog · MPC · JPL
(325740) 2009 VD_{81}	11 October 2009	MLS	Mount Lemmon	5.217	0.143	9.6	4.469	5.965	12 km	–	catalog · MPC · JPL
(325877) 2010 TJ_{168}	27 September 2009	Spacewatch	Kitt Peak	5.141	0.093	17.1	4.661	5.621	11 km	–	catalog · MPC · JPL
(325936) 2010 VL_{31}	19 September 2009	CSS	Catalina	5.186	0.181	8.2	4.248	6.124	13 km	–	catalog · MPC · JPL
(325945) 2010 VR_{57}	24 September 2009	MLS	Mount Lemmon	5.234	0.159	5.2	4.403	6.065	12 km	–	catalog · MPC · JPL
(326119) 2011 WH_{45}	23 April 2004	Spacewatch	Kitt Peak	5.141	0.069	4.2	4.788	5.493	11 km	–	catalog · MPC · JPL
(326123) 2011 YH_{32}	18 September 2009	Spacewatch	Kitt Peak	5.146	0.042	5.4	4.929	5.363	9.5 km	–	catalog · MPC · JPL
(326125) 2011 YY_{61}	8 November 2009	CSS	Catalina	5.209	0.104	20.3	4.665	5.752	14 km	–	catalog · MPC · JPL
(326127) 2011 YS_{74}	1 October 2009	MLS	Mount Lemmon	5.259	0.117	13.0	4.645	5.872	12 km	–	catalog · MPC · JPL
(326135) 2012 BV_{23}	1 October 2008	CSS	Catalina	5.267	0.054	14.3	4.980	5.553	13 km	–	catalog · MPC · JPL
(326153) 2012 BE_{67}	29 January 2010	WISE	WISE	5.237	0.060	16.3	4.922	5.552	11 km	–	catalog · MPC · JPL
(326212) 2012 CC_{39}	5 July 2005	MLS	Mount Lemmon	5.324	0.036	5.3	5.132	5.517	9.8 km	–	catalog · MPC · JPL
(328381) 2008 RK_{41}	2 September 2008	Spacewatch	Kitt Peak	5.279	0.079	7.3	4.860	5.697	8.1 km	–	catalog · MPC · JPL
(328628) 2009 SU_{176}	19 September 2009	MLS	Mount Lemmon	5.181	0.077	6.9	4.783	5.579	9.9 km	–	catalog · MPC · JPL
(328732) 2009 TG_{46}	8 April 2002	C. Barbieri	La Silla	5.197	0.082	18.1	4.773	5.621	13 km	–	catalog · MPC · JPL
(328764) 2009 UW_{97}	23 October 2009	MLS	Mount Lemmon	5.174	0.053	9.5	4.899	5.449	11 km	–	catalog · MPC · JPL
(328865) 2009 WX_{233}	20 September 2009	MLS	Mount Lemmon	5.278	0.082	8.4	4.846	5.711	9.9 km	–	catalog · MPC · JPL
(328877) 2010 BJ_{70}	13 September 2007	MLS	Mount Lemmon	5.327	0.075	23.8	4.928	5.725	12 km	–	catalog · MPC · JPL
(328878) 2010 BP_{94}	26 April 2003	Spacewatch	Kitt Peak	5.256	0.061	9.6	4.933	5.579	11 km	–	catalog · MPC · JPL
(329008) 2010 XZ_{64}	23 June 2004	J. Pittichová; J. Bedient	Mauna Kea	5.154	0.086	8.7	4.708	5.600	7.4 km	–	catalog · MPC · JPL
(329150) 2011 YC_{73}	25 September 2008	MLS	Mount Lemmon	5.190	0.095	6.3	4.698	5.681	9.8 km	–	catalog · MPC · JPL
(331050) 2009 VH_{107}	8 November 2009	MLS	Mount Lemmon	5.137	0.091	8.1	4.669	5.604	13 km	–	catalog · MPC · JPL
(331107) 2010 BS_{118}	24 November 2009	CSS	Catalina	5.187	0.057	24.3	4.890	5.484	13 km	–	catalog · MPC · JPL
(337997) 2002 EO_{19}	9 March 2002	NEAT	Palomar	5.227	0.101	12.7	4.701	5.754	10 km	–	catalog · MPC · JPL
(339562) 2005 JF_{162}	8 May 2005	Spacewatch	Kitt Peak	5.175	0.015	9.0	5.096	5.254	10 km	–	catalog · MPC · JPL
(343174) 2009 SH_{333}	25 September 2009	CSS	Catalina	5.257	0.018	25.0	5.164	5.350	17 km	–	catalog · MPC · JPL
(343680) 2010 UD_{2}	17 October 2010	MLS	Mount Lemmon	5.229	0.143	16.3	4.481	5.976	11 km	–	catalog · MPC · JPL
(343681) 2010 VN_{199}	23 June 2007	Spacewatch	Kitt Peak	5.174	0.097	5.4	4.674	5.675	12 km	–	catalog · MPC · JPL
(343689) 2011 CT_{22}	19 September 1998	Sloan Digital Sky Survey	Apache Point	5.144	0.120	14.8	4.526	5.762	11 km	–	catalog · MPC · JPL
(343794) 2011 GO_{61}	5 March 2002	LONEOS	Anderson Mesa	5.239	0.019	9.2	5.138	5.340	12 km	–	catalog · MPC · JPL
(344014) 2011 XX_{1}	28 July 2009	Spacewatch	Kitt Peak	5.204	0.049	8.1	4.952	5.457	10 km	–	catalog · MPC · JPL
(344185) 2001 DE_{106}	20 February 2001	LINEAR	Socorro	5.279	0.120	17.6	4.643	5.915	13 km	–	catalog · MPC · JPL
(344435) 2002 FD_{38}	30 March 2002	NEAT	Palomar	5.303	0.025	18.6	5.172	5.433	16 km	–	catalog · MPC · JPL
(344629) 2003 JL_{18}	1 May 2003	Spacewatch	Kitt Peak	5.239	0.080	8.1	4.817	5.660	9.2 km	–	catalog · MPC · JPL
(347148) 2010 WY	17 October 2009	CSS	Catalina	5.261	0.050	8.5	4.997	5.524	13 km	–	catalog · MPC · JPL
(347578) 2001 AY_{49}	22 December 2000	Spacewatch	Kitt Peak	5.164	0.053	22.9	4.892	5.437	11 km	–	catalog · MPC · JPL
(347943) 2003 GF_{57}	9 April 2003	Spacewatch	Kitt Peak	5.206	0.062	12.9	4.883	5.528	13 km	–	catalog · MPC · JPL
(348402) 2005 JP_{34}	4 May 2005	Spacewatch	Kitt Peak	5.170	0.048	21.6	4.923	5.418	12 km	–	catalog · MPC · JPL
(348787) 2006 PX_{5}	12 August 2006	NEAT	Palomar	5.281	0.040	27.8	5.072	5.491	15 km	–	catalog · MPC · JPL
(349592) 2008 TJ_{48}	2 October 2008	Spacewatch	Kitt Peak	5.169	0.058	5.5	4.868	5.470	10 km	–	catalog · MPC · JPL
(349916) 2009 QE_{59}	28 August 2009	Spacewatch	Kitt Peak	5.172	0.042	12.4	4.956	5.389	13 km	–	catalog · MPC · JPL
(349918) 2009 SU_{154}	16 August 2009	Spacewatch	Kitt Peak	5.151	0.079	3.6	4.744	5.558	8.3 km	–	catalog · MPC · JPL
(349919) 2009 SZ_{166}	22 September 2009	Spacewatch	Kitt Peak	5.123	0.055	6.0	4.841	5.404	8.5 km	–	catalog · MPC · JPL
(349920) 2009 SC_{211}	23 September 2009	Spacewatch	Kitt Peak	5.215	0.056	8.0	4.923	5.507	11 km	–	catalog · MPC · JPL
(349923) 2009 UF_{8}	25 September 2009	Spacewatch	Kitt Peak	5.231	0.020	5.5	5.127	5.334	10 km	–	catalog · MPC · JPL
(350051) 2010 PH_{25}	5 August 2010	WISE	WISE	5.146	0.087	8.7	4.699	5.592	11 km	–	catalog · MPC · JPL
(350052) 2010 PQ_{38}	26 March 2003	Spacewatch	Kitt Peak	5.236	0.069	9.0	4.875	5.597	13 km	–	catalog · MPC · JPL
(350053) 2010 PE_{49}	7 August 2010	WISE	WISE	5.164	0.081	7.7	4.747	5.580	8.4 km	–	catalog · MPC · JPL
(350055) 2010 RE_{38}	26 November 2009	MLS	Mount Lemmon	5.140	0.018	17.6	5.050	5.230	13 km	–	catalog · MPC · JPL
(350059) 2010 TA_{143}	15 August 2009	Spacewatch	Kitt Peak	5.073	0.036	9.7	4.889	5.257	8.9 km	–	catalog · MPC · JPL
(350060) 2010 VV_{114}	4 November 2010	L. Bernasconi	Les Engarouines	5.140	0.041	12.6	4.927	5.353	11 km	–	catalog · MPC · JPL
(350061) 2010 VX_{141}	6 November 2010	MLS	Mount Lemmon	5.240	0.032	6.9	5.072	5.409	11 km	–	catalog · MPC · JPL
(350179) 2011 UY_{145}	16 May 2004	Spacewatch	Kitt Peak	5.172	0.101	12.5	4.651	5.692	11 km	–	catalog · MPC · JPL
(350191) 2011 UG_{402}	19 January 2002	Spacewatch	Kitt Peak	5.107	0.052	6.8	4.839	5.374	8.5 km	–	catalog · MPC · JPL
(350192) 2011 WG_{32}	9 February 2002	Spacewatch	Kitt Peak	5.184	0.047	3.6	4.939	5.429	9.8 km	–	catalog · MPC · JPL
(350193) 2011 WS_{106}	31 October 2010	CSS	Catalina	5.180	0.075	27.6	4.792	5.567	13 km	–	catalog · MPC · JPL
(350196) 2011 YH_{65}	5 September 2008	Spacewatch	Kitt Peak	5.086	0.060	7.0	4.780	5.391	10 km	–	catalog · MPC · JPL
(350198) 2012 AL_{14}	25 September 2009	CSS	Catalina	5.152	0.108	17.2	4.594	5.711	12 km	–	catalog · MPC · JPL
(350451) 1996 RH_{6}	5 September 1996	Spacewatch	Kitt Peak	5.184	0.033	9.9	5.011	5.358	9.7 km	–	catalog · MPC · JPL
(350574) 2001 BN_{83}	18 January 2001	NEAT	Haleakala	5.166	0.139	7.4	4.445	5.886	13 km	–	catalog · MPC · JPL
(350794) 2002 CM_{159}	7 February 2002	LINEAR	Socorro	5.242	0.174	12.2	4.331	6.154	13 km	–	catalog · MPC · JPL
(350801) 2002 CU_{202}	14 January 2002	LINEAR	Socorro	5.091	0.043	12.5	4.870	5.312	12 km	–	catalog · MPC · JPL
(350825) 2002 ER_{38}	14 January 2002	Spacewatch	Kitt Peak	5.103	0.082	6.6	4.684	5.522	9.1 km	–	catalog · MPC · JPL
(350836) 2002 EO_{157}	13 March 2002	NEAT	Palomar	5.260	0.159	8.5	4.422	6.099	8.4 km	–	catalog · MPC · JPL
(350978) 2003 FZ_{36}	23 March 2003	Spacewatch	Kitt Peak	5.197	0.069	9.9	4.839	5.555	12 km	–	catalog · MPC · JPL
(351210) 2004 JD_{40}	25 April 2004	Spacewatch	Kitt Peak	5.263	0.005	24.5	5.234	5.292	15 km	–	catalog · MPC · JPL
(352155) 2007 PP_{47}	10 August 2007	Spacewatch	Kitt Peak	5.265	0.014	11.6	5.192	5.338	11 km	–	catalog · MPC · JPL
(352649) 2008 OQ_{22}	29 July 2008	Spacewatch	Kitt Peak	5.245	0.088	9.5	4.784	5.707	9.3 km	–	catalog · MPC · JPL
(352655) 2008 QX_{28}	31 August 2008	Moletai	Moletai	5.244	0.041	12.5	5.028	5.461	12 km	–	catalog · MPC · JPL
(352659) 2008 RE_{2}	2 September 2008	Spacewatch	Kitt Peak	5.220	0.072	17.9	4.843	5.597	12 km	–	catalog · MPC · JPL
(352662) 2008 RM_{14}	4 September 2008	Spacewatch	Kitt Peak	5.131	0.037	6.1	4.941	5.320	10 km	–	catalog · MPC · JPL
(352666) 2008 RZ_{58}	3 September 2008	Spacewatch	Kitt Peak	5.168	0.018	9.8	5.076	5.259	8.6 km	–	catalog · MPC · JPL
(352668) 2008 RQ_{72}	6 September 2008	MLS	Mount Lemmon	5.228	0.082	6.4	4.800	5.657	11 km	–	catalog · MPC · JPL
(352671) 2008 RC_{95}	7 September 2008	MLS	Mount Lemmon	5.179	0.052	7.5	4.911	5.447	8.9 km	–	catalog · MPC · JPL
(352692) 2008 SS_{85}	19 September 2008	Spacewatch	Kitt Peak	5.134	0.038	20.2	4.936	5.331	9.5 km	–	catalog · MPC · JPL
(352793) 2008 UF_{189}	25 October 2008	MLS	Mount Lemmon	5.160	0.027	7.3	5.021	5.299	8.5 km	–	catalog · MPC · JPL
(353178) 2009 QK_{59}	28 August 2009	Spacewatch	Kitt Peak	5.143	0.045	3.4	4.911	5.376	8.0 km	–	catalog · MPC · JPL
(353179) 2009 RA_{12}	12 September 2009	Spacewatch	Kitt Peak	5.218	0.068	5.1	4.862	5.574	9.1 km	–	catalog · MPC · JPL
(353180) 2009 RG_{14}	12 September 2009	Spacewatch	Kitt Peak	5.120	0.011	7.2	5.064	5.177	8.7 km	–	catalog · MPC · JPL
(353181) 2009 RW_{31}	14 February 2002	Spacewatch	Kitt Peak	5.191	0.130	5.8	4.514	5.867	9.0 km	–	catalog · MPC · JPL
(353182) 2009 RR_{63}	15 September 2009	Spacewatch	Kitt Peak	5.227	0.121	13.6	4.596	5.859	9.5 km	–	catalog · MPC · JPL
(353183) 2009 RF_{64}	15 September 2009	Spacewatch	Kitt Peak	5.148	0.030	1.3	4.996	5.301	7.9 km	–	catalog · MPC · JPL
(353184) 2009 RQ_{64}	15 September 2009	Spacewatch	Kitt Peak	5.249	0.093	1.0	4.763	5.735	8.0 km	–	catalog · MPC · JPL
(353185) 2009 RT_{64}	15 September 2009	Spacewatch	Kitt Peak	5.212	0.126	8.0	4.554	5.870	10 km	–	catalog · MPC · JPL
(353186) 2009 RR_{67}	4 September 2008	Spacewatch	Kitt Peak	5.222	0.110	4.6	4.647	5.797	7.5 km	–	catalog · MPC · JPL
(353187) 2009 RK_{68}	20 September 2008	MLS	Mount Lemmon	5.165	0.035	0.6	4.984	5.346	7.2 km	–	catalog · MPC · JPL
(353188) 2009 RR_{68}	15 September 2009	Spacewatch	Kitt Peak	5.315	0.059	7.9	4.999	5.631	9.2 km	–	catalog · MPC · JPL
353189 Iasus	13 September 2009	Palomar Transient Factory	Palomar	5.211	0.161	14.8	4.374	6.047	11 km	–	catalog · MPC · JPL
(353191) 2009 SJ_{48}	16 September 2009	Spacewatch	Kitt Peak	5.298	0.045	3.6	5.062	5.534	8.5 km	–	catalog · MPC · JPL
(353192) 2009 ST_{50}	17 September 2009	Spacewatch	Kitt Peak	5.124	0.075	12.0	4.738	5.510	9.7 km	–	catalog · MPC · JPL
(353193) 2009 SH_{58}	13 February 2002	Sloan Digital Sky Survey	Apache Point	5.129	0.027	6.2	4.992	5.266	8.1 km	–	catalog · MPC · JPL
(353194) 2009 SM_{100}	17 September 2009	K. Černis; J. Zdanavičius	Moletai	5.145	0.089	16.2	4.689	5.600	11 km	–	catalog · MPC · JPL
(353195) 2009 SP_{119}	13 February 2002	Sloan Digital Sky Survey	Apache Point	5.130	0.045	4.8	4.898	5.361	7.0 km	–	catalog · MPC · JPL
(353196) 2009 SF_{156}	4 September 2008	Spacewatch	Kitt Peak	5.118	0.058	4.9	4.821	5.414	7.4 km	–	catalog · MPC · JPL
(353197) 2009 SW_{185}	21 September 2009	Spacewatch	Kitt Peak	5.071	0.037	6.4	4.882	5.261	7.6 km	–	catalog · MPC · JPL
(353198) 2009 SB_{200}	7 September 2008	MLS	Mount Lemmon	5.198	0.124	3.1	4.555	5.841	8.6 km	–	catalog · MPC · JPL
(353199) 2009 SU_{211}	23 September 2009	MLS	Mount Lemmon	5.255	0.110	8.2	4.678	5.832	8.5 km	–	catalog · MPC · JPL
(353200) 2009 SA_{246}	17 September 2009	Spacewatch	Kitt Peak	5.159	0.057	11.7	4.866	5.452	11 km	–	catalog · MPC · JPL
(353201) 2009 SP_{246}	17 September 2009	Spacewatch	Kitt Peak	5.132	0.063	14.3	4.808	5.456	11 km	–	catalog · MPC · JPL
(353202) 2009 SB_{254}	26 September 2009	Spacewatch	Kitt Peak	5.306	0.051	7.9	5.035	5.576	10 km	–	catalog · MPC · JPL
(353203) 2009 SJ_{264}	23 September 2009	MLS	Mount Lemmon	5.245	0.046	8.5	5.005	5.486	9.9 km	–	catalog · MPC · JPL
(353204) 2009 SR_{281}	25 September 2009	Spacewatch	Kitt Peak	5.157	0.051	5.1	4.895	5.419	9.8 km	–	catalog · MPC · JPL
(353205) 2009 SN_{318}	20 September 2009	Spacewatch	Kitt Peak	5.304	0.065	2.2	4.957	5.651	8.3 km	–	catalog · MPC · JPL
(353208) 2009 SZ_{353}	17 September 2009	Spacewatch	Kitt Peak	5.246	0.033	11.5	5.072	5.420	9.2 km	–	catalog · MPC · JPL
(353209) 2009 SC_{354}	28 September 2009	MLS	Mount Lemmon	5.255	0.053	8.0	4.976	5.533	9.4 km	–	catalog · MPC · JPL
(353210) 2009 SO_{355}	18 September 2009	CSS	Catalina	5.182	0.046	10.3	4.946	5.419	13 km	–	catalog · MPC · JPL
(353211) 2009 SQ_{355}	20 September 2009	Spacewatch	Kitt Peak	5.303	0.070	4.9	4.932	5.673	9.3 km	–	catalog · MPC · JPL
(353212) 2009 SB_{356}	24 April 2003	Spacewatch	Kitt Peak	5.263	0.071	4.0	4.888	5.639	8.7 km	–	catalog · MPC · JPL
(353213) 2009 SY_{356}	18 September 2009	Spacewatch	Kitt Peak	5.230	0.133	7.9	4.537	5.923	7.3 km	–	catalog · MPC · JPL
(353215) 2009 TE_{12}	14 October 2009	CSS	Catalina	5.252	0.121	22.4	4.615	5.888	15 km	–	catalog · MPC · JPL
(353217) 2009 UG_{60}	28 September 2009	Spacewatch	Kitt Peak	5.277	0.075	4.5	4.882	5.672	8.1 km	–	catalog · MPC · JPL
(353218) 2009 UN_{67}	17 October 2009	MLS	Mount Lemmon	5.273	0.034	13.5	5.094	5.452	16 km	–	catalog · MPC · JPL
(353227) 2010 AP_{119}	1 October 2009	MLS	Mount Lemmon	5.216	0.079	7.7	4.804	5.628	13 km	–	catalog · MPC · JPL
(353228) 2010 AC_{121}	17 September 2009	MLS	Mount Lemmon	5.269	0.045	13.1	5.033	5.504	13 km	–	catalog · MPC · JPL
(353230) 2010 BJ_{35}	3 September 2008	Spacewatch	Kitt Peak	5.196	0.127	9.7	4.537	5.855	12 km	–	catalog · MPC · JPL
(353336) 2010 PG_{26}	10 August 2010	Spacewatch	Kitt Peak	5.156	0.087	7.5	4.708	5.605	7.7 km	–	catalog · MPC · JPL
(353342) 2010 UJ_{77}	13 October 2010	MLS	Mount Lemmon	5.159	0.027	10.7	5.019	5.299	11 km	–	catalog · MPC · JPL
(353343) 2010 VD_{5}	2 October 2010	MLS	Mount Lemmon	5.233	0.085	7.5	4.788	5.678	10 km	–	catalog · MPC · JPL
(353344) 2010 VF_{21}	9 March 2002	Spacewatch	Kitt Peak	5.213	0.114	1.6	4.621	5.806	7.4 km	–	catalog · MPC · JPL
(353346) 2010 VV_{78}	28 September 2009	MLS	Mount Lemmon	5.129	0.089	8.5	4.673	5.585	8.0 km	–	catalog · MPC · JPL
(353347) 2010 VB_{90}	19 September 2009	Spacewatch	Kitt Peak	5.195	0.085	6.4	4.755	5.634	9.2 km	–	catalog · MPC · JPL
(353348) 2010 VR_{100}	2 February 2001	Spacewatch	Kitt Peak	5.234	0.160	1.6	4.395	6.073	6.9 km	–	catalog · MPC · JPL
(353349) 2010 VT_{103}	9 September 2007	D. D. Balam	Mauna Kea	5.213	0.056	5.4	4.919	5.507	8.8 km	–	catalog · MPC · JPL
(353350) 2010 VA_{116}	28 December 2000	Spacewatch	Kitt Peak	5.285	0.059	6.2	4.975	5.594	9.4 km	–	catalog · MPC · JPL
(353351) 2010 VO_{138}	27 September 2009	MLS	Mount Lemmon	5.205	0.087	8.5	4.751	5.658	10 km	–	catalog · MPC · JPL
(353352) 2010 VK_{165}	25 September 2009	Spacewatch	Kitt Peak	5.156	0.144	7.0	4.413	5.899	7.9 km	–	catalog · MPC · JPL
(353353) 2010 VS_{173}	23 March 2003	Spacewatch	Kitt Peak	5.138	0.129	13.8	4.475	5.800	9.5 km	–	catalog · MPC · JPL
(353354) 2010 VC_{181}	6 September 2008	MLS	Mount Lemmon	5.243	0.061	1.8	4.924	5.562	8.8 km	–	catalog · MPC · JPL
(353355) 2010 VQ_{184}	7 September 2008	MLS	Mount Lemmon	5.194	0.042	1.5	4.977	5.411	7.4 km	–	catalog · MPC · JPL
(353356) 2010 VZ_{214}	18 September 2009	Spacewatch	Kitt Peak	5.143	0.089	6.8	4.686	5.600	7.5 km	–	catalog · MPC · JPL
(353357) 2010 WD_{2}	15 November 1998	Spacewatch	Kitt Peak	5.175	0.103	1.6	4.642	5.708	7.1 km	–	catalog · MPC · JPL
(353358) 2010 WG_{54}	28 September 2008	MLS	Mount Lemmon	5.226	0.068	5.2	4.871	5.582	8.6 km	–	catalog · MPC · JPL
(353359) 2010 WN_{60}	21 April 2003	Spacewatch	Kitt Peak	5.177	0.078	9.9	4.771	5.583	12 km	–	catalog · MPC · JPL
(353360) 2010 WY_{67}	24 August 2008	Spacewatch	Kitt Peak	5.098	0.004	4.1	5.079	5.117	8.8 km	–	catalog · MPC · JPL
(353361) 2010 XV_{24}	8 June 2005	Spacewatch	Kitt Peak	5.202	0.105	16.2	4.653	5.751	12 km	–	catalog · MPC · JPL
(353362) 2010 XS_{47}	8 October 2010	CSS	Catalina	5.117	0.095	10.1	4.628	5.605	9.7 km	–	catalog · MPC · JPL
(353363) 2010 XP_{50}	31 March 2003	LONEOS	Anderson Mesa	5.192	0.113	24.9	4.606	5.778	15 km	–	catalog · MPC · JPL
(353364) 2010 XC_{77}	17 November 2009	CSS	Catalina	5.204	0.134	13.5	4.507	5.901	14 km	–	catalog · MPC · JPL
(353721) 2011 WR_{1}	1 November 2010	MLS	Mount Lemmon	5.128	0.053	9.3	4.857	5.400	9.8 km	–	catalog · MPC · JPL
(353727) 2011 WF_{62}	18 September 2010	MLS	Mount Lemmon	5.169	0.163	5.6	4.326	6.013	7.4 km	–	catalog · MPC · JPL
(353737) 2011 XO_{1}	12 November 2010	MLS	Mount Lemmon	5.184	0.156	12.9	4.377	5.990	13 km	–	catalog · MPC · JPL
(353738) 2011 YP	20 November 2011	Spacewatch	Kitt Peak	5.263	0.082	9.9	4.832	5.694	13 km	–	catalog · MPC · JPL
(353739) 2011 YN_{8}	27 September 2009	MLS	Mount Lemmon	5.254	0.088	9.8	4.790	5.719	9.2 km	–	catalog · MPC · JPL
(353740) 2011 YB_{18}	12 October 2010	MLS	Mount Lemmon	5.153	0.066	8.7	4.815	5.490	8.7 km	–	catalog · MPC · JPL
(353742) 2011 YE_{28}	24 November 2011	Pan-STARRS 1	Haleakala	5.219	0.100	21.8	4.696	5.742	12 km	–	catalog · MPC · JPL
(353743) 2011 YN_{40}	29 September 2009	MLS	Mount Lemmon	5.281	0.091	8.6	4.800	5.761	11 km	–	catalog · MPC · JPL
(353744) 2011 YL_{45}	2 December 2010	MLS	Mount Lemmon	5.209	0.050	8.3	4.948	5.469	9.2 km	–	catalog · MPC · JPL
(353747) 2011 YK_{57}	14 October 2009	MLS	Mount Lemmon	5.356	0.043	7.4	5.124	5.588	11 km	–	catalog · MPC · JPL
(353748) 2011 YT_{65}	1 October 2009	MLS	Mount Lemmon	5.186	0.076	15.9	4.793	5.580	9.2 km	–	catalog · MPC · JPL
(353749) 2011 YP_{74}	19 May 2004	Spacewatch	Kitt Peak	5.222	0.078	27.4	4.816	5.627	12 km	–	catalog · MPC · JPL
(353753) 2012 BU_{57}	24 September 2008	MLS	Mount Lemmon	5.205	0.040	4.2	4.995	5.414	9.2 km	–	catalog · MPC · JPL
(353755) 2012 BW_{101}	9 September 2008	MLS	Mount Lemmon	5.200	0.109	6.6	4.634	5.766	8.3 km	–	catalog · MPC · JPL
(353761) 2012 CF_{52}	11 September 2007	MLS	Mount Lemmon	5.146	0.096	8.4	4.652	5.639	12 km	–	catalog · MPC · JPL
(353930) 1995 OX_{17}	27 July 1995	Spacewatch	Kitt Peak	5.224	0.040	7.8	5.016	5.432	8.4 km	–	catalog · MPC · JPL
(353971) 2000 AE_{210}	5 January 2000	Spacewatch	Kitt Peak	5.171	0.013	26.8	5.103	5.240	15 km	–	catalog · MPC · JPL
(354008) 2001 DQ_{55}	16 February 2001	Spacewatch	Kitt Peak	5.159	0.114	9.9	4.571	5.746	9.2 km	–	catalog · MPC · JPL
(354144) 2002 CB_{94}	7 February 2002	LINEAR	Socorro	5.216	0.039	23.0	5.013	5.420	14 km	–	catalog · MPC · JPL
(354178) 2002 CS_{314}	7 February 2002	NEAT	Palomar	5.142	0.113	19.4	4.559	5.725	9.5 km	–	catalog · MPC · JPL
(354180) 2002 CC_{318}	2 December 2010	MLS	Mount Lemmon	5.066	0.035	7.4	4.886	5.245	8.7 km	–	catalog · MPC · JPL
(354202) 2002 EF_{120}	10 March 2002	Asiago-DLR Asteroid Survey	Cima Ekar	5.197	0.026	9.0	5.063	5.332	10 km	–	catalog · MPC · JPL
(354213) 2002 FN_{41}	18 March 2002	Spacewatch	Kitt Peak	5.261	0.107	7.3	4.700	5.822	9.4 km	–	catalog · MPC · JPL
(354342) 2003 FB_{85}	28 March 2003	Spacewatch	Kitt Peak	5.195	0.032	6.5	5.027	5.362	13 km	–	catalog · MPC · JPL
(354351) 2003 GY_{24}	7 April 2003	Spacewatch	Kitt Peak	5.223	0.048	9.6	4.971	5.476	12 km	–	catalog · MPC · JPL
(354354) 2003 GV_{53}	4 April 2003	Spacewatch	Kitt Peak	5.191	0.034	10.0	5.012	5.370	13 km	–	catalog · MPC · JPL
(354364) 2003 KG_{25}	31 May 2003	M. W. Buie	Cerro Tololo	5.191	0.021	1.5	5.083	5.300	7.0 km	–	catalog · MPC · JPL
(355269) 2007 PH_{47}	10 August 2007	Spacewatch	Kitt Peak	5.276	0.050	22.6	5.014	5.538	13 km	–	catalog · MPC · JPL
(355270) 2007 PQ_{47}	10 August 2007	Spacewatch	Kitt Peak	5.249	0.137	17.9	4.531	5.968	12 km	–	catalog · MPC · JPL
(355286) 2007 RN_{99}	11 September 2007	Spacewatch	Kitt Peak	5.204	0.026	8.9	5.069	5.339	8.7 km	–	catalog · MPC · JPL
(355287) 2007 RS_{101}	10 August 2007	Spacewatch	Kitt Peak	5.213	0.055	8.0	4.925	5.501	7.3 km	–	catalog · MPC · JPL
(355291) 2007 RT_{155}	10 September 2007	Spacewatch	Kitt Peak	5.254	0.049	14.1	4.995	5.514	9.3 km	–	catalog · MPC · JPL
(355310) 2007 RB_{309}	10 September 2007	MLS	Mount Lemmon	5.217	0.041	6.5	5.001	5.433	8.7 km	–	catalog · MPC · JPL
(355375) 2007 TL_{350}	14 October 2007	MLS	Mount Lemmon	5.177	0.024	15.0	5.053	5.300	11 km	–	catalog · MPC · JPL
(355387) 2007 TG_{437}	4 October 2007	MLS	Mount Lemmon	5.220	0.064	4.5	4.888	5.551	9.3 km	–	catalog · MPC · JPL
(355755) 2008 QS_{24}	29 July 2008	Spacewatch	Kitt Peak	5.201	0.041	3.5	4.989	5.414	8.0 km	–	catalog · MPC · JPL
(355756) 2008 QL_{37}	21 August 2008	Spacewatch	Kitt Peak	5.140	0.099	7.9	4.629	5.651	8.9 km	–	catalog · MPC · JPL
(355757) 2008 QR_{41}	21 August 2008	Spacewatch	Kitt Peak	5.277	0.088	12.8	4.813	5.741	11 km	–	catalog · MPC · JPL
(355758) 2008 QM_{42}	24 August 2008	Spacewatch	Kitt Peak	5.273	0.007	5.6	5.237	5.310	7.5 km	–	catalog · MPC · JPL
(355760) 2008 RQ_{10}	3 September 2008	Spacewatch	Kitt Peak	5.176	0.108	7.3	4.616	5.737	10 km	–	catalog · MPC · JPL
(355762) 2008 RQ_{21}	4 September 2008	Spacewatch	Kitt Peak	5.282	0.074	11.6	4.893	5.672	9.9 km	–	catalog · MPC · JPL
(355765) 2008 RK_{37}	2 September 2008	Spacewatch	Kitt Peak	5.288	0.089	7.2	4.817	5.760	11 km	–	catalog · MPC · JPL
(355766) 2008 RR_{38}	2 September 2008	Spacewatch	Kitt Peak	5.193	0.060	5.8	4.879	5.506	8.0 km	–	catalog · MPC · JPL
(355768) 2008 RY_{57}	3 September 2008	Spacewatch	Kitt Peak	5.211	0.055	25.2	4.923	5.500	13 km	–	catalog · MPC · JPL
(355769) 2008 RP_{62}	4 September 2008	Spacewatch	Kitt Peak	5.211	0.074	8.7	4.826	5.596	6.8 km	–	catalog · MPC · JPL
(355774) 2008 RA_{122}	3 September 2008	Spacewatch	Kitt Peak	5.270	0.074	8.4	4.883	5.658	7.7 km	–	catalog · MPC · JPL
(355775) 2008 RK_{123}	6 September 2008	Spacewatch	Kitt Peak	5.126	0.029	8.0	4.978	5.275	7.4 km	–	catalog · MPC · JPL
(355776) 2008 RM_{123}	20 February 2002	Spacewatch	Kitt Peak	5.128	0.025	5.8	4.997	5.258	7.2 km	–	catalog · MPC · JPL
(355777) 2008 RV_{123}	6 September 2008	MLS	Mount Lemmon	5.154	0.078	3.4	4.752	5.556	7.7 km	–	catalog · MPC · JPL
(355778) 2008 RA_{125}	7 September 2008	MLS	Mount Lemmon	5.220	0.051	21.1	4.955	5.486	9.5 km	–	catalog · MPC · JPL
(355779) 2008 RY_{125}	9 September 2008	MLS	Mount Lemmon	5.315	0.082	7.8	4.882	5.749	8.6 km	–	catalog · MPC · JPL
(355780) 2008 RR_{126}	4 September 2008	Spacewatch	Kitt Peak	5.265	0.076	7.4	4.863	5.668	8.2 km	–	catalog · MPC · JPL
(355781) 2008 RZ_{126}	5 September 2008	Spacewatch	Kitt Peak	5.230	0.030	7.4	5.073	5.387	9.5 km	–	catalog · MPC · JPL
(355782) 2008 RY_{127}	6 September 2008	Spacewatch	Kitt Peak	5.280	0.019	7.1	5.180	5.380	8.1 km	–	catalog · MPC · JPL
(355788) 2008 SX_{50}	23 August 2008	Spacewatch	Kitt Peak	5.289	0.029	10.9	5.135	5.443	10 km	–	catalog · MPC · JPL
(355791) 2008 SW_{85}	20 September 2008	Spacewatch	Kitt Peak	5.204	0.018	14.0	5.109	5.299	8.2 km	–	catalog · MPC · JPL
(355808) 2008 SK_{275}	23 September 2008	Spacewatch	Kitt Peak	5.320	0.057	10.1	5.019	5.622	11 km	–	catalog · MPC · JPL
(355809) 2008 SK_{277}	24 September 2008	MLS	Mount Lemmon	5.189	0.063	8.3	4.862	5.516	8.3 km	–	catalog · MPC · JPL
(355810) 2008 SX_{279}	4 April 2003	Spacewatch	Kitt Peak	5.270	0.030	11.7	5.111	5.430	10 km	–	catalog · MPC · JPL
(355813) 2008 TZ_{23}	2 October 2008	Spacewatch	Kitt Peak	5.295	0.026	6.4	5.158	5.432	7.5 km	–	catalog · MPC · JPL
(355814) 2008 TU_{37}	1 October 2008	MLS	Mount Lemmon	5.209	0.087	6.8	4.756	5.663	9.5 km	–	catalog · MPC · JPL
(355816) 2008 TN_{58}	2 October 2008	Spacewatch	Kitt Peak	5.286	0.083	6.4	4.847	5.724	8.6 km	–	catalog · MPC · JPL
(355818) 2008 TL_{76}	2 October 2008	MLS	Mount Lemmon	5.259	0.042	1.0	5.037	5.481	7.3 km	–	catalog · MPC · JPL
(355820) 2008 TY_{96}	6 October 2008	Spacewatch	Kitt Peak	5.268	0.033	6.2	5.096	5.441	8.3 km	–	catalog · MPC · JPL
(355822) 2008 TY_{106}	3 September 2008	Spacewatch	Kitt Peak	5.236	0.079	13.7	4.823	5.649	8.6 km	–	catalog · MPC · JPL
(355830) 2008 TS_{174}	21 March 2002	Spacewatch	Kitt Peak	5.231	0.044	14.5	4.998	5.464	8.7 km	–	catalog · MPC · JPL
(355835) 2008 UW_{9}	17 October 2008	Spacewatch	Kitt Peak	5.219	0.015	9.0	5.141	5.296	9.1 km	–	catalog · MPC · JPL
(355836) 2008 UN_{15}	21 September 2008	Spacewatch	Kitt Peak	5.268	0.083	9.0	4.830	5.706	9.8 km	–	catalog · MPC · JPL
(355842) 2008 UU_{55}	21 October 2008	Spacewatch	Kitt Peak	5.251	0.048	3.8	4.997	5.506	8.7 km	–	catalog · MPC · JPL
(355849) 2008 UM_{109}	24 August 2008	Spacewatch	Kitt Peak	5.160	0.021	7.2	5.050	5.270	9.3 km	–	catalog · MPC · JPL
(355857) 2008 UT_{230}	26 October 2008	Spacewatch	Kitt Peak	5.227	0.151	3.5	4.435	6.018	9.5 km	–	catalog · MPC · JPL
(356205) 2009 QF_{65}	16 January 2012	L. Bernasconi	Les Engarouines	5.159	0.096	20.7	4.665	5.652	10 km	–	catalog · MPC · JPL
(356206) 2009 RN_{13}	12 September 2009	Spacewatch	Kitt Peak	5.251	0.077	16.3	4.845	5.657	9.3 km	–	catalog · MPC · JPL
(356207) 2009 RT_{20}	14 September 2009	Spacewatch	Kitt Peak	5.173	0.143	7.9	4.431	5.915	8.9 km	–	catalog · MPC · JPL
(356208) 2009 RK_{25}	22 June 2007	Spacewatch	Kitt Peak	5.192	0.093	20.2	4.710	5.674	13 km	–	catalog · MPC · JPL
(356209) 2009 RS_{31}	14 September 2009	Spacewatch	Kitt Peak	5.203	0.093	9.4	4.719	5.687	10 km	–	catalog · MPC · JPL
(356210) 2009 RY_{31}	14 September 2009	Spacewatch	Kitt Peak	5.106	0.049	11.8	4.854	5.358	8.9 km	–	catalog · MPC · JPL
(356211) 2009 RB_{63}	12 September 2009	Spacewatch	Kitt Peak	5.253	0.070	7.1	4.885	5.622	8.0 km	–	catalog · MPC · JPL
(356212) 2009 RP_{64}	15 September 2009	Spacewatch	Kitt Peak	5.281	0.061	3.3	4.961	5.601	8.2 km	–	catalog · MPC · JPL
(356213) 2009 RX_{64}	15 September 2009	Spacewatch	Kitt Peak	5.247	0.109	6.4	4.676	5.818	7.4 km	–	catalog · MPC · JPL
(356214) 2009 RN_{73}	14 February 2001	Asiago-DLR Asteroid Survey	Cima Ekar	5.199	0.013	20.7	5.133	5.266	11 km	–	catalog · MPC · JPL
(356215) 2009 SX_{40}	16 September 2009	Spacewatch	Kitt Peak	5.264	0.054	6.1	4.981	5.547	8.2 km	–	catalog · MPC · JPL
(356216) 2009 SH_{69}	17 September 2009	Spacewatch	Kitt Peak	5.220	0.096	5.4	4.721	5.719	7.7 km	–	catalog · MPC · JPL
356217 Clymene	23 September 2009	T. V. Kryachko	Zelenchukskaya Stn	5.275	0.090	18.0	4.802	5.749	11 km	–	catalog · MPC · JPL
(356218) 2009 SZ_{117}	18 September 2009	Spacewatch	Kitt Peak	5.243	0.142	5.1	4.496	5.990	6.5 km	–	catalog · MPC · JPL
(356219) 2009 SJ_{121}	18 September 2009	Spacewatch	Kitt Peak	5.192	0.098	2.0	4.682	5.703	7.1 km	–	catalog · MPC · JPL
(356220) 2009 SM_{123}	5 September 2008	Spacewatch	Kitt Peak	5.187	0.050	5.4	4.926	5.448	8.7 km	–	catalog · MPC · JPL
(356221) 2009 SF_{178}	20 September 2009	Spacewatch	Kitt Peak	5.138	0.071	3.7	4.773	5.502	7.8 km	–	catalog · MPC · JPL
(356222) 2009 SF_{194}	29 July 2008	MLS	Mount Lemmon	5.242	0.064	6.4	4.905	5.579	8.2 km	–	catalog · MPC · JPL
(356223) 2009 SH_{197}	18 September 2009	Spacewatch	Kitt Peak	5.209	0.147	9.4	4.444	5.974	9.5 km	–	catalog · MPC · JPL
(356224) 2009 SW_{199}	22 September 2009	Spacewatch	Kitt Peak	5.169	0.119	4.3	4.556	5.782	7.3 km	–	catalog · MPC · JPL
(356225) 2009 SY_{208}	15 September 2009	Spacewatch	Kitt Peak	5.168	0.116	6.4	4.567	5.769	7.7 km	–	catalog · MPC · JPL
(356226) 2009 SF_{246}	17 September 2009	Spacewatch	Kitt Peak	5.171	0.094	7.7	4.686	5.657	9.4 km	–	catalog · MPC · JPL
(356227) 2009 SE_{248}	22 September 2009	Spacewatch	Kitt Peak	5.188	0.104	7.1	4.651	5.726	7.3 km	–	catalog · MPC · JPL
(356228) 2009 SJ_{248}	23 September 2009	Spacewatch	Kitt Peak	5.201	0.016	14.6	5.120	5.283	7.9 km	–	catalog · MPC · JPL
(356229) 2009 SW_{273}	25 September 2009	Spacewatch	Kitt Peak	5.208	0.106	10.8	4.656	5.761	6.7 km	–	catalog · MPC · JPL
(356231) 2009 SS_{293}	19 September 2009	Spacewatch	Kitt Peak	5.212	0.062	7.5	4.888	5.535	9.2 km	–	catalog · MPC · JPL
(356232) 2009 SZ_{297}	17 September 2009	Spacewatch	Kitt Peak	5.130	0.044	5.1	4.906	5.354	8.9 km	–	catalog · MPC · JPL
(356233) 2009 SG_{299}	12 February 2002	Spacewatch	Kitt Peak	5.122	0.044	10.3	4.898	5.347	12 km	–	catalog · MPC · JPL
(356234) 2009 SA_{300}	17 September 2009	Spacewatch	Kitt Peak	5.183	0.121	6.1	4.557	5.808	7.0 km	–	catalog · MPC · JPL
(356235) 2009 SJ_{317}	19 September 2009	Spacewatch	Kitt Peak	5.155	0.031	2.1	4.993	5.317	6.7 km	–	catalog · MPC · JPL
(356236) 2009 ST_{323}	23 September 2009	MLS	Mount Lemmon	5.236	0.093	7.6	4.750	5.721	9.8 km	–	catalog · MPC · JPL
(356237) 2009 SA_{328}	18 September 2009	Spacewatch	Kitt Peak	5.113	0.042	8.2	4.897	5.329	9.1 km	–	catalog · MPC · JPL
(356238) 2009 SY_{353}	17 September 2009	MLS	Mount Lemmon	5.119	0.094	17.9	4.640	5.597	10 km	–	catalog · MPC · JPL
(356239) 2009 SA_{354}	17 November 1998	Spacewatch	Kitt Peak	5.186	0.070	4.4	4.821	5.550	7.2 km	–	catalog · MPC · JPL
(356240) 2009 SB_{354}	28 September 2009	MLS	Mount Lemmon	5.285	0.095	8.7	4.781	5.789	9.0 km	–	catalog · MPC · JPL
(356241) 2009 SS_{354}	17 September 2009	Spacewatch	Kitt Peak	5.171	0.088	9.6	4.717	5.625	10 km	–	catalog · MPC · JPL
(356242) 2009 SU_{354}	26 September 2009	Spacewatch	Kitt Peak	5.163	0.061	5.8	4.847	5.479	7.2 km	–	catalog · MPC · JPL
(356243) 2009 SE_{355}	23 September 2009	MLS	Mount Lemmon	5.207	0.171	15.2	4.317	6.098	8.9 km	–	catalog · MPC · JPL
(356244) 2009 SL_{357}	22 September 2009	Spacewatch	Kitt Peak	5.206	0.090	7.1	4.736	5.676	8.1 km	–	catalog · MPC · JPL
(356245) 2009 TR_{15}	1 October 2009	MLS	Mount Lemmon	5.235	0.048	9.9	4.983	5.488	12 km	–	catalog · MPC · JPL
(356247) 2009 UP_{7}	16 October 2009	MLS	Mount Lemmon	5.143	0.048	7.8	4.894	5.392	6.9 km	–	catalog · MPC · JPL
(356248) 2009 UO_{12}	17 August 2009	Spacewatch	Kitt Peak	5.148	0.084	6.6	4.717	5.580	7.6 km	–	catalog · MPC · JPL
(356249) 2009 UT_{48}	15 September 2009	Spacewatch	Kitt Peak	5.130	0.080	5.7	4.719	5.541	7.2 km	–	catalog · MPC · JPL
(356250) 2009 UB_{49}	5 April 2003	Spacewatch	Kitt Peak	5.217	0.059	2.6	4.908	5.525	7.7 km	–	catalog · MPC · JPL
(356251) 2009 UZ_{50}	22 September 2009	Spacewatch	Kitt Peak	5.304	0.053	3.4	5.025	5.584	7.3 km	–	catalog · MPC · JPL
(356252) 2009 UT_{53}	23 October 2009	MLS	Mount Lemmon	5.171	0.121	17.9	4.547	5.794	9.3 km	–	catalog · MPC · JPL
(356253) 2009 UK_{77}	21 October 2009	MLS	Mount Lemmon	5.127	0.032	5.8	4.963	5.291	6.3 km	–	catalog · MPC · JPL
(356254) 2009 US_{78}	15 November 1998	Spacewatch	Kitt Peak	5.119	0.030	5.3	4.964	5.273	8.1 km	–	catalog · MPC · JPL
(356255) 2009 UP_{120}	22 September 2009	Spacewatch	Kitt Peak	5.225	0.047	2.4	4.977	5.473	7.5 km	–	catalog · MPC · JPL
(356257) 2009 UL_{140}	23 October 2009	MLS	Mount Lemmon	5.178	0.046	8.5	4.941	5.415	11 km	–	catalog · MPC · JPL
(356258) 2009 UN_{147}	16 October 2009	MLS	Mount Lemmon	5.144	0.107	5.8	4.592	5.695	7.0 km	–	catalog · MPC · JPL
(356259) 2009 UV_{148}	16 October 2009	MLS	Mount Lemmon	5.125	0.070	8.5	4.765	5.486	11 km	–	catalog · MPC · JPL
(356261) 2009 VB_{3}	8 November 2009	Tzec Maun	Tzec Maun	5.333	0.057	22.7	5.031	5.635	18 km	–	catalog · MPC · JPL
(356262) 2009 VL_{15}	12 September 2007	MLS	Mount Lemmon	5.229	0.062	3.5	4.905	5.553	7.3 km	–	catalog · MPC · JPL
(356263) 2009 VO_{21}	25 October 2009	Spacewatch	Kitt Peak	5.305	0.043	6.1	5.076	5.533	10 km	–	catalog · MPC · JPL
(356264) 2009 VE_{25}	2 October 2009	MLS	Mount Lemmon	5.176	0.034	13.0	5.002	5.350	12 km	–	catalog · MPC · JPL
(356265) 2009 VQ_{26}	8 November 2009	Spacewatch	Kitt Peak	5.234	0.080	8.7	4.813	5.655	10 km	–	catalog · MPC · JPL
(356266) 2009 VY_{45}	9 November 2009	Spacewatch	Kitt Peak	5.273	0.064	10.9	4.937	5.609	11 km	–	catalog · MPC · JPL
(356268) 2009 WW_{2}	26 October 2009	Spacewatch	Kitt Peak	5.203	0.124	7.0	4.559	5.846	9.5 km	–	catalog · MPC · JPL
(356270) 2009 WJ_{107}	17 November 2009	MLS	Mount Lemmon	5.265	0.006	6.5	5.232	5.297	9.0 km	–	catalog · MPC · JPL
(356271) 2009 WN_{113}	18 November 2009	MLS	Mount Lemmon	5.181	0.092	7.2	4.703	5.659	8.1 km	–	catalog · MPC · JPL
(356272) 2009 WJ_{135}	8 October 2008	MLS	Mount Lemmon	5.249	0.058	2.8	4.944	5.554	7.2 km	–	catalog · MPC · JPL
(356273) 2009 WL_{152}	19 November 2009	MLS	Mount Lemmon	5.321	0.066	7.7	4.972	5.670	8.9 km	–	catalog · MPC · JPL
(356275) 2010 AU_{92}	8 January 2010	WISE	WISE	5.195	0.033	17.4	5.026	5.365	14 km	–	catalog · MPC · JPL
(356276) 2010 AJ_{107}	7 September 2008	MLS	Mount Lemmon	5.144	0.101	18.5	4.623	5.665	9.9 km	–	catalog · MPC · JPL
(356277) 2010 BL_{5}	4 January 2001	NEAT	Haleakala	5.305	0.061	16.0	4.983	5.627	11 km	–	catalog · MPC · JPL
(356279) 2010 BD_{41}	23 August 2007	Spacewatch	Kitt Peak	5.292	0.028	17.4	5.144	5.439	16 km	–	catalog · MPC · JPL
(356280) 2010 BK_{89}	31 August 2007	K. Sárneczky; L. Kiss	Siding Spring	5.268	0.125	8.7	4.607	5.928	9.2 km	–	catalog · MPC · JPL
(356284) 2010 CH_{242}	23 September 2008	MLS	Mount Lemmon	5.264	0.052	8.1	4.988	5.540	12 km	–	catalog · MPC · JPL
(356417) 2010 UG_{31}	26 September 2009	Spacewatch	Kitt Peak	5.251	0.119	2.9	4.628	5.874	8.2 km	–	catalog · MPC · JPL
(356418) 2010 UT_{48}	17 September 2009	Spacewatch	Kitt Peak	5.190	0.104	4.6	4.650	5.730	8.2 km	–	catalog · MPC · JPL
(356419) 2010 UL_{76}	30 October 2010	Spacewatch	Kitt Peak	5.221	0.091	9.0	4.745	5.698	12 km	–	catalog · MPC · JPL
(356421) 2010 VC_{13}	10 May 2005	M. W. Buie	Cerro Tololo	5.189	0.118	15.7	4.577	5.802	13 km	–	catalog · MPC · JPL
(356422) 2010 VO_{24}	15 November 1998	Spacewatch	Kitt Peak	5.188	0.106	6.6	4.638	5.739	8.1 km	–	catalog · MPC · JPL
(356423) 2010 VG_{61}	15 September 2009	Spacewatch	Kitt Peak	5.278	0.086	4.6	4.824	5.732	8.2 km	–	catalog · MPC · JPL
(356424) 2010 VP_{109}	25 September 2009	Spacewatch	Kitt Peak	5.100	0.050	6.6	4.843	5.358	8.2 km	–	catalog · MPC · JPL
(356425) 2010 VS_{119}	22 August 2007	Spacewatch	Kitt Peak	5.179	0.053	2.5	4.906	5.452	8.1 km	–	catalog · MPC · JPL
(356426) 2010 VB_{122}	13 February 2002	Sloan Digital Sky Survey	Apache Point	5.151	0.072	6.1	4.780	5.521	7.0 km	–	catalog · MPC · JPL
(356427) 2010 VJ_{122}	11 October 2010	MLS	Mount Lemmon	5.172	0.056	7.8	4.882	5.463	8.8 km	–	catalog · MPC · JPL
(356428) 2010 VH_{153}	7 November 2010	LINEAR	Socorro	5.206	0.206	10.6	4.135	6.276	11 km	–	catalog · MPC · JPL
(356429) 2010 VB_{176}	16 February 2001	Spacewatch	Kitt Peak	5.179	0.167	8.4	4.317	6.042	9.8 km	–	catalog · MPC · JPL
(356430) 2010 VM_{178}	16 September 2009	Spacewatch	Kitt Peak	5.153	0.031	5.8	4.993	5.312	9.0 km	–	catalog · MPC · JPL
(356431) 2010 VN_{179}	16 October 2009	MLS	Mount Lemmon	5.177	0.055	10.5	4.894	5.460	8.6 km	–	catalog · MPC · JPL
(356432) 2010 VW_{192}	13 January 2000	Spacewatch	Kitt Peak	5.255	0.071	7.4	4.881	5.629	8.7 km	–	catalog · MPC · JPL
(356433) 2010 VW_{202}	11 October 2010	MLS	Mount Lemmon	5.233	0.126	5.9	4.574	5.893	8.7 km	–	catalog · MPC · JPL
(356435) 2010 WP_{3}	15 September 2009	Spacewatch	Kitt Peak	5.240	0.207	2.4	4.153	6.327	6.5 km	–	catalog · MPC · JPL
(356436) 2010 WA_{5}	4 April 2003	Spacewatch	Kitt Peak	5.149	0.053	4.5	4.875	5.424	8.6 km	–	catalog · MPC · JPL
(356437) 2010 WK_{11}	29 July 2008	Spacewatch	Kitt Peak	5.200	0.083	9.1	4.767	5.633	7.3 km	–	catalog · MPC · JPL
(356438) 2010 WJ_{21}	21 September 2008	MLS	Mount Lemmon	5.299	0.057	3.0	4.995	5.603	8.1 km	–	catalog · MPC · JPL
(356439) 2010 WH_{46}	5 September 2008	Spacewatch	Kitt Peak	5.211	0.043	6.2	4.988	5.434	8.6 km	–	catalog · MPC · JPL
(356440) 2010 WV_{68}	27 October 2009	MLS	Mount Lemmon	5.080	0.038	7.8	4.886	5.273	8.9 km	–	catalog · MPC · JPL
(356441) 2010 XX_{7}	17 September 2009	Spacewatch	Kitt Peak	5.267	0.082	8.5	4.834	5.700	8.3 km	–	catalog · MPC · JPL
(356442) 2010 XR_{24}	30 November 2000	Sloan Digital Sky Survey	Apache Point	5.187	0.123	14.1	4.548	5.827	11 km	–	catalog · MPC · JPL
(356443) 2010 XR_{32}	29 October 2010	MLS	Mount Lemmon	5.137	0.111	9.1	4.568	5.707	8.6 km	–	catalog · MPC · JPL
(356444) 2010 XK_{35}	28 October 2010	MLS	Mount Lemmon	5.160	0.096	7.2	4.663	5.658	10 km	–	catalog · MPC · JPL
(356445) 2010 XD_{45}	6 June 2005	Spacewatch	Kitt Peak	5.166	0.086	20.3	4.723	5.608	12 km	–	catalog · MPC · JPL
(356446) 2010 XD_{74}	17 June 2005	MLS	Mount Lemmon	5.222	0.031	10.3	5.061	5.382	13 km	–	catalog · MPC · JPL
(356447) 2010 XW_{75}	2 November 2010	Spacewatch	Kitt Peak	5.220	0.086	6.2	4.773	5.667	8.8 km	–	catalog · MPC · JPL
(356448) 2010 XU_{78}	10 September 2007	Spacewatch	Kitt Peak	5.284	0.069	8.1	4.921	5.647	8.9 km	–	catalog · MPC · JPL
(356449) 2010 XO_{79}	8 November 2010	MLS	Mount Lemmon	5.183	0.059	8.5	4.879	5.487	8.8 km	–	catalog · MPC · JPL
(356450) 2010 XF_{85}	11 June 2007	D. D. Balam	Mauna Kea	5.228	0.121	13.1	4.595	5.861	12 km	–	catalog · MPC · JPL
(356451) 2011 GP_{27}	19 July 2007	MLS	Mount Lemmon	5.158	0.099	4.6	4.648	5.667	9.8 km	–	catalog · MPC · JPL
(356864) 2011 WW_{64}	18 September 2010	MLS	Mount Lemmon	5.243	0.107	5.3	4.683	5.803	8.6 km	–	catalog · MPC · JPL
(356893) 2011 XL_{3}	14 February 2002	Spacewatch	Kitt Peak	5.242	0.042	28.1	5.021	5.463	12 km	–	catalog · MPC · JPL
(356895) 2011 YO_{16}	12 December 1999	LINEAR	Socorro	5.264	0.105	21.9	4.709	5.819	13 km	–	catalog · MPC · JPL
(356896) 2011 YX_{20}	10 October 2008	MLS	Mount Lemmon	5.233	0.060	10.5	4.921	5.545	11 km	–	catalog · MPC · JPL
(356897) 2011 YQ_{28}	24 November 2009	CSS	Catalina	5.382	0.056	28.5	5.080	5.684	15 km	–	catalog · MPC · JPL
(356898) 2011 YT_{29}	29 September 2009	MLS	Mount Lemmon	5.180	0.058	6.2	4.878	5.482	7.7 km	–	catalog · MPC · JPL
(356899) 2011 YL_{42}	29 July 2008	Spacewatch	Kitt Peak	5.188	0.119	10.0	4.569	5.807	9.9 km	–	catalog · MPC · JPL
(356900) 2011 YN_{43}	5 January 2000	Spacewatch	Kitt Peak	5.197	0.131	9.4	4.514	5.880	8.2 km	–	catalog · MPC · JPL
(356901) 2011 YJ_{55}	12 January 2000	Spacewatch	Kitt Peak	5.310	0.060	13.9	4.989	5.630	10 km	–	catalog · MPC · JPL
(356902) 2011 YF_{56}	5 September 2008	Spacewatch	Kitt Peak	5.145	0.093	6.3	4.668	5.621	7.9 km	–	catalog · MPC · JPL
(356903) 2011 YH_{71}	27 May 2003	Spacewatch	Kitt Peak	5.348	0.020	10.6	5.239	5.458	11 km	–	catalog · MPC · JPL
(356904) 2011 YT_{71}	29 October 2010	Spacewatch	Kitt Peak	5.145	0.074	5.4	4.764	5.526	10 km	–	catalog · MPC · JPL
(356905) 2011 YC_{75}	1 October 2009	MLS	Mount Lemmon	5.164	0.103	8.2	4.633	5.695	8.0 km	–	catalog · MPC · JPL
(356906) 2011 YE_{75}	21 March 2002	Spacewatch	Kitt Peak	5.258	0.066	3.2	4.910	5.606	9.1 km	–	catalog · MPC · JPL
(356907) 2011 YW_{76}	25 May 2007	Spacewatch	Kitt Peak	5.174	0.086	12.3	4.731	5.617	12 km	–	catalog · MPC · JPL
(356909) 2012 AP_{14}	22 April 2004	Sloan Digital Sky Survey	Apache Point	5.229	0.091	34.3	4.753	5.705	14 km	–	catalog · MPC · JPL
(356910) 2012 AA_{17}	8 February 2010	WISE	WISE	5.245	0.059	13.5	4.935	5.555	12 km	–	catalog · MPC · JPL
(356911) 2012 BQ_{5}	5 September 2008	Spacewatch	Kitt Peak	5.297	0.060	5.4	4.979	5.615	8.4 km	–	catalog · MPC · JPL
(356912) 2012 BW_{36}	5 September 2008	Spacewatch	Kitt Peak	5.306	0.037	6.1	5.107	5.504	10 km	–	catalog · MPC · JPL
(356913) 2012 BQ_{50}	17 October 2008	Spacewatch	Kitt Peak	5.194	0.053	8.6	4.917	5.470	8.8 km	–	catalog · MPC · JPL
(356914) 2012 BJ_{57}	6 October 2008	MLS	Mount Lemmon	5.250	0.068	6.6	4.896	5.605	9.1 km	–	catalog · MPC · JPL
(356915) 2012 BG_{61}	11 September 2007	MLS	Mount Lemmon	5.161	0.064	5.8	4.830	5.491	7.9 km	–	catalog · MPC · JPL
(356916) 2012 BH_{61}	16 February 2001	Asiago-DLR Asteroid Survey	Cima Ekar	5.161	0.101	7.0	4.642	5.681	8.3 km	–	catalog · MPC · JPL
(356918) 2012 BF_{119}	16 January 2000	Spacewatch	Kitt Peak	5.177	0.186	5.1	4.212	6.141	7.8 km	–	catalog · MPC · JPL
(356962) 2012 XG_{120}	14 May 2004	Spacewatch	Kitt Peak	5.211	0.029	5.7	5.063	5.360	11 km	–	catalog · MPC · JPL
(356987) 1997 UJ_{6}	23 October 1997	Spacewatch	Kitt Peak	5.217	0.102	19.3	4.686	5.749	12 km	–	catalog · MPC · JPL
(357183) 2002 ET_{102}	9 March 2002	Spacewatch	Kitt Peak	5.106	0.045	10.7	4.875	5.336	9.0 km	–	catalog · MPC · JPL
(357656) 2005 JZ_{60}	8 May 2005	Spacewatch	Kitt Peak	5.173	0.110	9.4	4.606	5.740	10 km	–	catalog · MPC · JPL
(358501) 2007 RB_{153}	24 August 2007	Spacewatch	Kitt Peak	5.191	0.064	13.7	4.857	5.526	7.4 km	–	catalog · MPC · JPL
(358513) 2007 RM_{255}	14 September 2007	Spacewatch	Kitt Peak	5.331	0.060	3.7	5.010	5.653	7.8 km	–	catalog · MPC · JPL
(358518) 2007 RD_{309}	10 September 2007	MLS	Mount Lemmon	5.223	0.084	3.5	4.783	5.662	6.9 km	–	catalog · MPC · JPL
(358519) 2007 RE_{309}	10 September 2007	MLS	Mount Lemmon	5.179	0.017	4.4	5.090	5.268	7.7 km	–	catalog · MPC · JPL
(358966) 2008 RY_{16}	4 September 2008	Spacewatch	Kitt Peak	5.186	0.063	3.6	4.857	5.514	7.5 km	–	catalog · MPC · JPL
(358968) 2008 RM_{94}	6 September 2008	Spacewatch	Kitt Peak	5.187	0.095	4.9	4.694	5.680	7.7 km	–	catalog · MPC · JPL
(358971) 2008 RQ_{112}	5 September 2008	Spacewatch	Kitt Peak	5.223	0.137	9.3	4.509	5.937	8.4 km	–	catalog · MPC · JPL
(358975) 2008 SY_{16}	19 September 2008	Spacewatch	Kitt Peak	5.237	0.033	3.9	5.067	5.408	7.8 km	–	catalog · MPC · JPL
(358976) 2008 SZ_{38}	20 September 2008	Spacewatch	Kitt Peak	5.270	0.052	13.3	4.997	5.543	12 km	–	catalog · MPC · JPL
(358977) 2008 SA_{77}	23 September 2008	MLS	Mount Lemmon	5.249	0.126	7.6	4.590	5.907	8.6 km	–	catalog · MPC · JPL
(358981) 2008 SK_{113}	8 September 2008	Spacewatch	Kitt Peak	5.212	0.061	3.6	4.893	5.532	8.5 km	–	catalog · MPC · JPL
(358988) 2008 SC_{216}	29 September 2008	MLS	Mount Lemmon	5.249	0.031	3.9	5.085	5.414	7.3 km	–	catalog · MPC · JPL
(358989) 2008 SG_{229}	28 September 2008	MLS	Mount Lemmon	5.245	0.089	21.3	4.778	5.711	9.6 km	–	catalog · MPC · JPL
(358992) 2008 SG_{275}	23 September 2008	Spacewatch	Kitt Peak	5.191	0.039	6.7	4.991	5.391	7.7 km	–	catalog · MPC · JPL
(358993) 2008 SQ_{275}	23 September 2008	Spacewatch	Kitt Peak	5.202	0.014	7.1	5.127	5.277	7.4 km	–	catalog · MPC · JPL
(358994) 2008 SN_{279}	22 September 2008	MLS	Mount Lemmon	5.186	0.026	4.5	5.052	5.319	7.9 km	–	catalog · MPC · JPL
(359000) 2008 TP_{108}	6 October 2008	MLS	Mount Lemmon	5.167	0.059	7.2	4.864	5.471	8.7 km	–	catalog · MPC · JPL
(359001) 2008 TP_{150}	10 August 2007	Spacewatch	Kitt Peak	5.245	0.036	9.7	5.057	5.433	10 km	–	catalog · MPC · JPL
(359004) 2008 UP_{23}	9 October 2008	MLS	Mount Lemmon	5.332	0.016	11.5	5.245	5.419	7.5 km	–	catalog · MPC · JPL
(359011) 2008 UY_{205}	22 October 2008	Spacewatch	Kitt Peak	5.177	0.084	5.3	4.740	5.614	7.5 km	–	catalog · MPC · JPL
(359025) 2008 VM_{16}	1 November 2008	Spacewatch	Kitt Peak	5.302	0.016	7.6	5.217	5.386	6.8 km	–	catalog · MPC · JPL
(359339) 2009 RL_{40}	15 September 2009	Spacewatch	Kitt Peak	5.186	0.103	25.6	4.653	5.720	13 km	–	catalog · MPC · JPL
(359340) 2009 RX_{73}	15 September 2009	Spacewatch	Kitt Peak	5.143	0.027	6.6	5.002	5.284	8.2 km	–	catalog · MPC · JPL
(359343) 2009 SE_{143}	19 September 2009	Spacewatch	Kitt Peak	5.256	0.076	8.5	4.856	5.655	7.5 km	–	catalog · MPC · JPL
(359345) 2009 SE_{198}	21 August 2008	Spacewatch	Kitt Peak	5.253	0.069	6.7	4.892	5.614	7.8 km	–	catalog · MPC · JPL
(359346) 2009 SE_{205}	22 September 2009	Spacewatch	Kitt Peak	5.088	0.013	6.0	5.024	5.153	8.9 km	–	catalog · MPC · JPL
(359347) 2009 SX_{207}	15 September 2009	Spacewatch	Kitt Peak	5.238	0.121	2.5	4.606	5.870	8.2 km	–	catalog · MPC · JPL
(359349) 2009 SG_{248}	23 September 2009	Spacewatch	Kitt Peak	5.162	0.122	6.0	4.530	5.794	7.1 km	–	catalog · MPC · JPL
(359350) 2009 SD_{254}	16 September 2009	Spacewatch	Kitt Peak	5.150	0.058	5.4	4.851	5.450	7.9 km	–	catalog · MPC · JPL
(359351) 2009 SH_{289}	18 September 2009	Spacewatch	Kitt Peak	5.176	0.114	8.5	4.588	5.765	8.6 km	–	catalog · MPC · JPL
(359352) 2009 SH_{290}	21 September 2009	Spacewatch	Kitt Peak	5.210	0.135	13.5	4.505	5.914	12 km	–	catalog · MPC · JPL
(359354) 2009 SG_{347}	28 September 2009	MLS	Mount Lemmon	5.222	0.153	8.8	4.421	6.023	8.8 km	–	catalog · MPC · JPL
(359355) 2009 SC_{355}	18 September 2009	Spacewatch	Kitt Peak	5.243	0.080	9.1	4.822	5.663	7.8 km	–	catalog · MPC · JPL
(359357) 2009 TM_{46}	11 October 2009	MLS	Mount Lemmon	5.185	0.092	8.0	4.710	5.660	8.9 km	–	catalog · MPC · JPL
(359358) 2009 TN_{46}	15 October 2009	MLS	Mount Lemmon	5.234	0.234	7.0	4.011	6.456	6.8 km	–	catalog · MPC · JPL
(359360) 2009 US_{28}	18 October 2009	MLS	Mount Lemmon	5.288	0.101	6.7	4.753	5.823	9.7 km	–	catalog · MPC · JPL
(359361) 2009 US_{55}	23 October 2009	MLS	Mount Lemmon	5.212	0.102	7.8	4.682	5.741	10 km	–	catalog · MPC · JPL
(359363) 2009 UR_{105}	21 October 2009	MLS	Mount Lemmon	5.233	0.148	5.6	4.459	6.008	6.5 km	–	catalog · MPC · JPL
(359364) 2009 UF_{130}	20 October 2009	IAA-AI	Atacama	5.207	0.135	11.8	4.504	5.910	11 km	–	catalog · MPC · JPL
(359365) 2009 VN_{11}	8 November 2009	Spacewatch	Kitt Peak	5.298	0.062	2.8	4.970	5.625	7.3 km	–	catalog · MPC · JPL
(359366) 2009 VK_{20}	18 March 2002	Spacewatch	Kitt Peak	5.204	0.077	5.8	4.804	5.604	8.7 km	–	catalog · MPC · JPL
(359368) 2009 WC_{57}	16 November 2009	MLS	Mount Lemmon	5.245	0.063	8.6	4.914	5.576	13 km	–	catalog · MPC · JPL
(359585) 2010 UA_{47}	29 August 2009	Spacewatch	Kitt Peak	5.156	0.226	8.4	3.993	6.319	8.4 km	–	catalog · MPC · JPL
(359594) 2010 VF_{86}	17 September 2009	Spacewatch	Kitt Peak	5.163	0.097	8.6	4.661	5.664	8.2 km	–	catalog · MPC · JPL
(359598) 2010 VT_{152}	30 April 2003	Spacewatch	Kitt Peak	5.226	0.124	26.8	4.577	5.876	8.0 km	–	catalog · MPC · JPL
(359603) 2010 WU_{5}	20 September 2009	Spacewatch	Kitt Peak	5.208	0.142	8.9	4.468	5.948	8.1 km	–	catalog · MPC · JPL
(359604) 2010 WZ_{9}	23 September 2009	Spacewatch	Kitt Peak	5.202	0.205	6.3	4.136	6.269	7.3 km	–	catalog · MPC · JPL
(359606) 2010 WV_{63}	1 November 2010	Spacewatch	Kitt Peak	5.218	0.111	11.1	4.640	5.796	8.2 km	–	catalog · MPC · JPL
(359607) 2010 WD_{64}	26 October 2009	Spacewatch	Kitt Peak	5.193	0.098	5.0	4.685	5.702	8.7 km	–	catalog · MPC · JPL
(359610) 2010 XG_{39}	6 October 2008	MLS	Mount Lemmon	5.229	0.194	8.6	4.213	6.245	8.6 km	–	catalog · MPC · JPL
(359614) 2011 GK_{3}	14 December 2010	MLS	Mount Lemmon	5.294	0.046	10.5	5.049	5.538	11 km	–	catalog · MPC · JPL
(359937) 2011 YQ_{24}	5 December 1999	Spacewatch	Kitt Peak	5.256	0.039	9.7	5.049	5.463	11 km	–	catalog · MPC · JPL
(359939) 2011 YF_{38}	4 March 2000	Spacewatch	Kitt Peak	5.243	0.063	15.2	4.914	5.572	12 km	–	catalog · MPC · JPL
(359940) 2011 YR_{44}	11 April 2003	Spacewatch	Kitt Peak	5.287	0.053	8.3	5.006	5.568	10 km	–	catalog · MPC · JPL
(359943) 2011 YG_{75}	13 October 2009	W. Bickel	Bergisch Gladbach	5.152	0.094	8.4	4.669	5.636	8.8 km	–	catalog · MPC · JPL
(359945) 2012 AR_{8}	12 June 2007	D. D. Balam	Mauna Kea	5.172	0.111	18.5	4.600	5.744	7.4 km	–	catalog · MPC · JPL
(359957) 2012 BY_{50}	6 December 2010	MLS	Mount Lemmon	5.182	0.100	8.7	4.665	5.699	8.7 km	–	catalog · MPC · JPL
(359960) 2012 BQ_{61}	12 October 2009	MLS	Mount Lemmon	5.236	0.052	6.8	4.965	5.506	10 km	–	catalog · MPC · JPL
(359961) 2012 BN_{71}	9 October 2008	MLS	Mount Lemmon	5.221	0.045	9.7	4.988	5.454	9.9 km	–	catalog · MPC · JPL
(359963) 2012 BX_{76}	26 October 2009	Spacewatch	Kitt Peak	5.227	0.166	5.0	4.358	6.095	8.9 km	–	catalog · MPC · JPL
(359965) 2012 BA_{97}	24 September 2008	Spacewatch	Kitt Peak	5.205	0.019	9.7	5.104	5.306	9.5 km	–	catalog · MPC · JPL
(359966) 2012 BP_{129}	9 July 2005	Spacewatch	Kitt Peak	5.233	0.005	7.9	5.208	5.258	8.3 km	–	catalog · MPC · JPL
(359969) 2012 CM_{17}	24 August 2007	Spacewatch	Kitt Peak	5.254	0.081	10.9	4.829	5.679	9.3 km	–	catalog · MPC · JPL
(359974) 2012 HS_{2}	28 December 2011	MLS	Mount Lemmon	5.248	0.120	19.2	4.616	5.879	11 km	–	catalog · MPC · JPL
(359975) 2012 HQ_{13}	26 October 2009	Spacewatch	Kitt Peak	5.144	0.067	9.7	4.798	5.490	8.8 km	–	catalog · MPC · JPL
(360031) 2013 AA_{30}	26 January 2010	WISE	WISE	5.270	0.048	8.6	5.015	5.526	11 km	–	catalog · MPC · JPL
(360041) 2013 AO_{53}	20 October 2012	MLS	Mount Lemmon	5.165	0.069	12.3	4.808	5.523	9.6 km	–	catalog · MPC · JPL
(360047) 2013 AM_{59}	26 December 2000	Spacewatch	Kitt Peak	5.165	0.107	14.8	4.614	5.716	12 km	–	catalog · MPC · JPL
(360057) 2013 AK_{92}	8 July 2007	LUSS	Lulin	5.233	0.035	12.3	5.049	5.417	12 km	–	catalog · MPC · JPL
(360058) 2013 AL_{92}	14 November 1998	Spacewatch	Kitt Peak	5.208	0.088	6.9	4.748	5.668	9.0 km	–	catalog · MPC · JPL
(360064) 2013 AP_{104}	5 April 2002	NEAT	Palomar	5.246	0.125	10.4	4.592	5.899	10 km	–	catalog · MPC · JPL
(360070) 2013 AY_{126}	28 October 2010	MLS	Mount Lemmon	5.067	0.059	3.3	4.769	5.365	9.5 km	–	catalog · MPC · JPL
(360071) 2013 AC_{131}	4 September 2008	Spacewatch	Kitt Peak	5.154	0.060	9.6	4.848	5.461	8.1 km	–	catalog · MPC · JPL
360072 Alcimedon	2 September 2008	Zelenchukskaya Stn	Zelenchukskaya Stn	5.193	0.089	6.2	4.733	5.654	10 km	–	catalog · MPC · JPL
(360073) 2013 AL_{131}	28 December 2000	Spacewatch	Kitt Peak	5.210	0.052	17.1	4.937	5.484	13 km	–	catalog · MPC · JPL
(360075) 2013 AD_{132}	1 October 2009	MLS	Mount Lemmon	5.248	0.059	12.3	4.937	5.560	11 km	–	catalog · MPC · JPL
(360076) 2013 AE_{132}	30 May 2003	M. W. Buie	Cerro Tololo	5.301	0.066	6.5	4.951	5.651	7.7 km	–	catalog · MPC · JPL
(360077) 2013 AK_{132}	12 November 2010	MLS	Mount Lemmon	5.261	0.050	12.9	4.996	5.525	8.3 km	–	catalog · MPC · JPL
(360079) 2013 BM_{1}	29 July 2008	Spacewatch	Kitt Peak	5.140	0.088	6.2	4.689	5.591	8.9 km	–	catalog · MPC · JPL
(360088) 2013 BB_{47}	10 February 2002	LINEAR	Socorro	5.200	0.043	9.3	4.975	5.426	8.6 km	–	catalog · MPC · JPL
(360093) 2013 BF_{62}	13 September 2007	MLS	Mount Lemmon	5.220	0.040	8.0	5.013	5.427	8.8 km	–	catalog · MPC · JPL
(360100) 2013 BC_{65}	8 May 2005	Spacewatch	Kitt Peak	5.193	0.095	7.4	4.699	5.687	10 km	–	catalog · MPC · JPL
(360103) 2013 CW	1 November 2008	MLS	Mount Lemmon	5.251	0.063	12.6	4.923	5.579	13 km	–	catalog · MPC · JPL
(360107) 2013 CS_{14}	17 January 2010	WISE	WISE	5.175	0.058	17.3	4.874	5.477	12 km	–	catalog · MPC · JPL
(360143) 2013 CS_{48}	26 October 2009	Spacewatch	Kitt Peak	5.245	0.030	7.3	5.086	5.404	8.1 km	–	catalog · MPC · JPL
(360160) 2013 CC_{69}	28 September 2008	MLS	Mount Lemmon	5.268	0.034	7.5	5.087	5.449	10 km	–	catalog · MPC · JPL
(360162) 2013 CJ_{71}	11 November 2009	CSS	Catalina	5.191	0.123	23.3	4.553	5.829	12 km	–	catalog · MPC · JPL
(360171) 2013 CZ_{102}	22 September 2008	MLS	Mount Lemmon	5.175	0.166	16.4	4.318	6.032	11 km	–	catalog · MPC · JPL
(360180) 2013 CD_{137}	12 September 2007	MLS	Mount Lemmon	5.251	0.054	10.9	4.970	5.532	11 km	–	catalog · MPC · JPL
(360185) 2013 CP_{177}	29 September 2009	MLS	Mount Lemmon	5.207	0.093	8.9	4.725	5.689	9.5 km	–	catalog · MPC · JPL
(360390) 2002 CW_{317}	26 July 2008	Siding Spring Survey	Siding Spring	5.129	0.082	29.0	4.710	5.549	14 km	–	catalog · MPC · JPL
(361999) 2008 TV_{96}	6 October 2008	Spacewatch	Kitt Peak	5.249	0.099	6.2	4.731	5.767	9.1 km	–	catalog · MPC · JPL
(362314) 2009 UH_{134}	2 October 2008	Spacewatch	Kitt Peak	5.225	0.070	3.9	4.857	5.593	6.3 km	–	catalog · MPC · JPL
(362321) 2010 BC_{125}	14 May 2004	Spacewatch	Kitt Peak	5.231	0.075	27.0	4.837	5.625	13 km	–	catalog · MPC · JPL
(362915) 2012 CS_{40}	9 July 2005	Spacewatch	Kitt Peak	5.267	0.043	10.8	5.040	5.495	9.3 km	–	catalog · MPC · JPL
(362965) 2013 BU_{56}	5 January 2013	MLS	Mount Lemmon	5.069	0.074	10.1	4.693	5.444	9.1 km	–	catalog · MPC · JPL
(362976) 2013 CK_{36}	5 September 2008	Spacewatch	Kitt Peak	5.339	0.055	10.8	5.045	5.632	11 km	–	catalog · MPC · JPL
(362981) 2013 CK_{58}	16 January 2010	WISE	WISE	5.228	0.088	25.8	4.766	5.690	16 km	–	catalog · MPC · JPL
(362982) 2013 CT_{58}	6 November 2010	CSS	Catalina	5.137	0.200	11.0	4.108	6.166	8.8 km	–	catalog · MPC · JPL
(365037) 2008 SQ_{261}	24 September 2008	Spacewatch	Kitt Peak	5.180	0.083	7.4	4.752	5.607	8.7 km	–	catalog · MPC · JPL
(365301) 2009 RC_{63}	12 September 2009	Spacewatch	Kitt Peak	5.298	0.099	10.6	4.773	5.823	7.6 km	–	catalog · MPC · JPL
(365475) 2010 PF_{26}	8 December 1998	Spacewatch	Kitt Peak	5.177	0.022	13.8	5.065	5.288	11 km	–	catalog · MPC · JPL
(365652) 2010 VS_{25}	1 November 2010	Spacewatch	Kitt Peak	5.253	0.102	12.0	4.719	5.788	11 km	–	catalog · MPC · JPL
(365663) 2010 VA_{46}	18 September 2010	MLS	Mount Lemmon	5.225	0.191	17.1	4.225	6.226	12 km	–	catalog · MPC · JPL
(365695) 2010 VD_{119}	16 September 2009	Spacewatch	Kitt Peak	5.135	0.066	10.7	4.797	5.474	7.9 km	–	catalog · MPC · JPL
(365724) 2010 VC_{188}	13 November 2010	MLS	Mount Lemmon	5.224	0.124	11.4	4.573	5.874	10 km	–	catalog · MPC · JPL
(365918) 2011 WL_{136}	3 November 2010	Spacewatch	Kitt Peak	5.220	0.138	6.7	4.497	5.942	7.9 km	–	catalog · MPC · JPL
(366253) 2012 YS_{2}	9 April 2003	Spacewatch	Kitt Peak	5.222	0.078	10.4	4.813	5.631	10 km	–	catalog · MPC · JPL
(366254) 2012 YY_{2}	21 November 1998	Spacewatch	Kitt Peak	5.140	0.088	6.5	4.690	5.591	8.3 km	–	catalog · MPC · JPL
(366262) 2013 AD_{19}	20 October 2012	MLS	Mount Lemmon	5.291	0.036	15.4	5.100	5.482	12 km	–	catalog · MPC · JPL
(366264) 2013 AM_{22}	2 October 2009	MLS	Mount Lemmon	5.350	0.037	15.6	5.150	5.550	14 km	–	catalog · MPC · JPL
(366269) 2013 AN_{37}	13 May 2004	Spacewatch	Kitt Peak	5.200	0.082	3.8	4.776	5.625	8.7 km	–	catalog · MPC · JPL
(366287) 2013 AR_{132}	6 September 2008	Spacewatch	Kitt Peak	5.215	0.211	12.0	4.112	6.318	9.8 km	–	catalog · MPC · JPL
(366317) 2013 CV_{197}	4 September 2008	Spacewatch	Kitt Peak	5.163	0.091	7.9	4.694	5.631	7.0 km	–	catalog · MPC · JPL
(368097) 2013 BN	2 November 2010	MLS	Mount Lemmon	5.174	0.069	10.4	4.816	5.533	10 km	–	catalog · MPC · JPL
(368102) 2013 CW_{191}	30 July 2008	Spacewatch	Kitt Peak	5.180	0.113	23.8	4.596	5.764	8.5 km	–	catalog · MPC · JPL
(369917) 2013 CH_{196}	12 January 2000	Spacewatch	Kitt Peak	5.210	0.072	7.5	4.836	5.584	7.4 km	–	catalog · MPC · JPL
(376543) 2013 BB_{25}	26 March 2003	Spacewatch	Kitt Peak	5.293	0.013	7.0	5.224	5.363	9.3 km	–	catalog · MPC · JPL
(379187) 2009 RV_{63}	15 September 2009	Spacewatch	Kitt Peak	5.151	0.070	22.2	4.792	5.509	12 km	–	catalog · MPC · JPL
(379531) 2010 WP_{10}	26 September 2009	Spacewatch	Kitt Peak	5.263	0.073	2.6	4.877	5.649	7.1 km	–	catalog · MPC · JPL
(379844) 2012 BJ_{72}	27 December 2011	MLS	Mount Lemmon	5.256	0.059	9.6	4.944	5.567	11 km	–	catalog · MPC · JPL
(379997) 2013 CM_{156}	8 May 2006	MLS	Mount Lemmon	5.305	0.103	13.9	4.761	5.849	9.7 km	–	catalog · MPC · JPL
(379998) 2013 CG_{159}	24 August 2007	Spacewatch	Kitt Peak	5.231	0.070	12.9	4.864	5.598	9.2 km	–	catalog · MPC · JPL
(380307) 2002 EL_{23}	5 March 2002	Spacewatch	Kitt Peak	5.195	0.088	22.5	4.736	5.654	11 km	–	catalog · MPC · JPL
(382303) 2013 BO_{1}	23 December 2000	Spacewatch	Kitt Peak	5.180	0.019	16.4	5.082	5.279	14 km	–	catalog · MPC · JPL
(385129) 2013 CC_{215}	14 February 2002	Spacewatch	Kitt Peak	5.157	0.014	10.2	5.085	5.228	8.7 km	–	catalog · MPC · JPL
(385330) 2002 CL_{269}	7 February 2002	M. W. Buie	Kitt Peak	5.219	0.072	12.0	4.844	5.595	13 km	–	catalog · MPC · JPL
(385340) 2002 JZ_{115}	11 May 2002	La Palma	La Palma	5.198	0.063	24.6	4.871	5.525	13 km	–	catalog · MPC · JPL
(385493) 2004 CN_{49}	14 January 2002	Spacewatch	Kitt Peak	5.179	0.043	18.0	4.958	5.400	9.1 km	–	catalog · MPC · JPL
(386620) 2009 RX_{54}	6 September 2008	CSS	Catalina	5.238	0.047	6.5	4.994	5.483	9.1 km	–	catalog · MPC · JPL
(386627) 2009 SY_{59}	17 September 2009	Spacewatch	Kitt Peak	5.226	0.030	11.2	5.067	5.384	11 km	–	catalog · MPC · JPL
(386633) 2009 SS_{139}	21 August 2008	Spacewatch	Kitt Peak	5.120	0.075	10.8	4.738	5.502	10 km	–	catalog · MPC · JPL
(386640) 2009 SE_{246}	17 September 2009	Spacewatch	Kitt Peak	5.212	0.063	13.5	4.884	5.539	8.7 km	–	catalog · MPC · JPL
(386645) 2009 SW_{262}	23 September 2009	MLS	Mount Lemmon	5.151	0.080	12.3	4.737	5.564	8.3 km	–	catalog · MPC · JPL
(386649) 2009 SK_{319}	20 September 2009	Spacewatch	Kitt Peak	5.290	0.024	4.1	5.165	5.415	9.0 km	–	catalog · MPC · JPL
(386674) 2009 UU_{148}	16 October 2009	MLS	Mount Lemmon	5.236	0.028	13.2	5.090	5.381	9.4 km	–	catalog · MPC · JPL
(386853) 2010 UM_{79}	7 September 2008	MLS	Mount Lemmon	5.242	0.038	6.9	5.041	5.444	7.9 km	–	catalog · MPC · JPL
(386854) 2010 UT_{79}	5 September 2008	Spacewatch	Kitt Peak	5.195	0.046	7.8	4.955	5.435	8.7 km	–	catalog · MPC · JPL
(386856) 2010 XZ_{7}	12 November 2010	MLS	Mount Lemmon	5.175	0.037	8.8	4.981	5.369	9.7 km	–	catalog · MPC · JPL
(386966) 2011 WC_{51}	18 August 2009	Spacewatch	Kitt Peak	5.169	0.037	5.7	4.976	5.362	7.7 km	–	catalog · MPC · JPL
(386967) 2011 YS_{34}	2 February 2001	Spacewatch	Kitt Peak	5.169	0.069	6.4	4.811	5.527	7.9 km	–	catalog · MPC · JPL
(387028) 2012 SP_{10}	17 October 2010	MLS	Mount Lemmon	5.182	0.088	21.6	4.724	5.640	12 km	–	catalog · MPC · JPL
(387381) 2013 AJ_{8}	21 September 2009	Spacewatch	Kitt Peak	5.258	0.054	7.7	4.977	5.540	9.7 km	–	catalog · MPC · JPL
(387382) 2013 AB_{41}	12 February 2002	Spacewatch	Kitt Peak	5.284	0.051	4.6	5.017	5.552	10 km	–	catalog · MPC · JPL
(387383) 2013 AQ_{41}	20 September 2009	Spacewatch	Kitt Peak	5.234	0.089	2.0	4.770	5.699	7.5 km	–	catalog · MPC · JPL
(387384) 2013 AW_{57}	23 March 2002	Spacewatch	Kitt Peak	5.172	0.095	10.0	4.681	5.663	12 km	–	catalog · MPC · JPL
(387385) 2013 AX_{98}	31 December 2000	Spacewatch	Kitt Peak	5.247	0.111	9.0	4.665	5.829	10 km	–	catalog · MPC · JPL
(387386) 2013 AZ_{107}	29 July 2008	Spacewatch	Kitt Peak	5.095	0.053	4.4	4.823	5.367	8.3 km	–	catalog · MPC · JPL
(387388) 2013 AQ_{130}	15 October 2009	CSS	Catalina	5.254	0.057	18.0	4.957	5.551	12 km	–	catalog · MPC · JPL
(387389) 2013 AV_{130}	18 June 2006	Spacewatch	Kitt Peak	5.185	0.040	9.5	4.980	5.390	13 km	–	catalog · MPC · JPL
(387390) 2013 AG_{133}	6 November 2010	MLS	Mount Lemmon	5.119	0.097	8.8	4.625	5.614	9.2 km	–	catalog · MPC · JPL
(387391) 2013 AZ_{156}	13 May 2005	Spacewatch	Kitt Peak	5.146	0.017	12.0	5.060	5.233	9.3 km	–	catalog · MPC · JPL
(387392) 2013 BB	17 October 2010	MLS	Mount Lemmon	5.261	0.075	3.9	4.866	5.656	8.0 km	–	catalog · MPC · JPL
(387393) 2013 BF_{71}	27 March 2003	Spacewatch	Kitt Peak	5.126	0.115	11.9	4.537	5.715	11 km	–	catalog · MPC · JPL
(387605) 2002 CS_{207}	10 February 2002	LINEAR	Socorro	5.117	0.103	12.4	4.588	5.646	9.9 km	–	catalog · MPC · JPL
(387608) 2002 EZ_{22}	11 March 2002	NEAT	Palomar	5.283	0.012	26.5	5.222	5.344	16 km	–	catalog · MPC · JPL
(388874) 2008 RB_{21}	4 September 2008	Spacewatch	Kitt Peak	5.298	0.065	20.7	4.954	5.643	9.3 km	–	catalog · MPC · JPL
(388876) 2008 RE_{29}	2 September 2008	Spacewatch	Kitt Peak	5.220	0.018	31.0	5.127	5.314	12 km	–	catalog · MPC · JPL
(388879) 2008 RE_{56}	3 September 2008	Spacewatch	Kitt Peak	5.207	0.107	11.3	4.651	5.762	9.2 km	–	catalog · MPC · JPL
(388887) 2008 RL_{110}	3 September 2008	Spacewatch	Kitt Peak	5.283	0.079	9.4	4.865	5.702	7.7 km	–	catalog · MPC · JPL
(388889) 2008 RZ_{123}	6 September 2008	Spacewatch	Kitt Peak	5.241	0.052	3.9	4.969	5.513	7.8 km	–	catalog · MPC · JPL
(388891) 2008 RW_{128}	5 September 2008	Spacewatch	Kitt Peak	5.127	0.044	6.5	4.903	5.352	7.4 km	–	catalog · MPC · JPL
(388898) 2008 SM_{23}	19 September 2008	Spacewatch	Kitt Peak	5.108	0.069	28.5	4.755	5.460	8.6 km	–	catalog · MPC · JPL
(388903) 2008 SK_{50}	20 September 2008	MLS	Mount Lemmon	5.181	0.057	18.7	4.883	5.479	12 km	–	catalog · MPC · JPL
(388924) 2008 SA_{154}	10 March 2003	Spacewatch	Kitt Peak	5.189	0.077	21.6	4.789	5.590	12 km	–	catalog · MPC · JPL
(388935) 2008 SQ_{229}	28 September 2008	MLS	Mount Lemmon	5.247	0.035	6.6	5.065	5.429	12 km	–	catalog · MPC · JPL
(388940) 2008 SD_{260}	23 September 2008	MLS	Mount Lemmon	5.158	0.042	9.3	4.941	5.376	8.9 km	–	catalog · MPC · JPL
(388972) 2008 TH_{173}	2 October 2008	Spacewatch	Kitt Peak	5.231	0.141	2.7	4.495	5.967	8.1 km	–	catalog · MPC · JPL
(389301) 2009 QH_{16}	16 August 2009	Spacewatch	Kitt Peak	5.194	0.083	9.7	4.765	5.622	8.2 km	–	catalog · MPC · JPL
(389302) 2009 RV_{25}	15 September 2009	Spacewatch	Kitt Peak	5.181	0.122	13.6	4.549	5.813	8.9 km	–	catalog · MPC · JPL
(389304) 2009 RC_{44}	4 April 2003	Spacewatch	Kitt Peak	5.191	0.040	28.8	4.982	5.399	12 km	–	catalog · MPC · JPL
(389305) 2009 RY_{49}	15 September 2009	Spacewatch	Kitt Peak	5.185	0.029	8.9	5.037	5.333	8.7 km	–	catalog · MPC · JPL
(389307) 2009 RU_{63}	15 September 2009	Spacewatch	Kitt Peak	5.122	0.060	7.7	4.815	5.429	9.1 km	–	catalog · MPC · JPL
(389309) 2009 SK_{25}	9 September 2008	MLS	Mount Lemmon	5.173	0.053	5.8	4.897	5.449	8.3 km	–	catalog · MPC · JPL
(389310) 2009 SS_{32}	16 September 2009	Spacewatch	Kitt Peak	5.281	0.050	18.5	5.015	5.547	9.9 km	–	catalog · MPC · JPL
(389313) 2009 SU_{76}	17 September 2009	Spacewatch	Kitt Peak	5.246	0.146	6.2	4.481	6.010	9.7 km	–	catalog · MPC · JPL
(389314) 2009 SH_{114}	18 September 2009	Spacewatch	Kitt Peak	5.178	0.119	15.4	4.562	5.793	8.7 km	–	catalog · MPC · JPL
(389316) 2009 SJ_{119}	18 September 2009	Spacewatch	Kitt Peak	5.136	0.089	7.0	4.677	5.595	7.6 km	–	catalog · MPC · JPL
(389317) 2009 ST_{140}	19 June 2007	Spacewatch	Kitt Peak	5.128	0.068	6.2	4.777	5.479	9.6 km	–	catalog · MPC · JPL
(389318) 2009 SV_{169}	19 September 2009	MLS	Mount Lemmon	5.228	0.107	6.3	4.670	5.786	9.8 km	–	catalog · MPC · JPL
(389320) 2009 SR_{197}	18 September 2009	Spacewatch	Kitt Peak	5.283	0.052	16.3	5.010	5.556	11 km	–	catalog · MPC · JPL
(389321) 2009 SQ_{199}	22 September 2009	Spacewatch	Kitt Peak	5.151	0.067	9.4	4.808	5.494	7.3 km	–	catalog · MPC · JPL
(389322) 2009 SQ_{203}	22 September 2009	Spacewatch	Kitt Peak	5.223	0.129	13.9	4.551	5.896	9.0 km	–	catalog · MPC · JPL
(389323) 2009 SL_{218}	24 September 2009	Spacewatch	Kitt Peak	5.115	0.095	8.1	4.627	5.604	7.6 km	–	catalog · MPC · JPL
(389326) 2009 SB_{244}	6 September 2008	Spacewatch	Kitt Peak	5.234	0.088	5.3	4.771	5.697	8.3 km	–	catalog · MPC · JPL
(389327) 2009 SB_{248}	30 July 2008	MLS	Mount Lemmon	5.115	0.062	7.0	4.797	5.433	7.4 km	–	catalog · MPC · JPL
(389328) 2009 SU_{253}	17 September 2009	Spacewatch	Kitt Peak	5.242	0.099	6.3	4.725	5.760	7.2 km	–	catalog · MPC · JPL
(389331) 2009 SL_{281}	25 September 2009	Spacewatch	Kitt Peak	5.208	0.055	5.2	4.922	5.495	9.1 km	–	catalog · MPC · JPL
(389332) 2009 SF_{283}	25 September 2009	Spacewatch	Kitt Peak	5.102	0.073	8.6	4.732	5.472	8.3 km	–	catalog · MPC · JPL
(389334) 2009 SP_{295}	27 September 2009	MLS	Mount Lemmon	5.183	0.078	9.4	4.779	5.586	7.0 km	–	catalog · MPC · JPL
(389335) 2009 SN_{298}	29 September 2009	Spacewatch	Kitt Peak	5.174	0.014	7.6	5.103	5.245	8.7 km	–	catalog · MPC · JPL
(389336) 2009 SN_{306}	17 September 2009	Spacewatch	Kitt Peak	5.170	0.081	10.2	4.751	5.589	8.0 km	–	catalog · MPC · JPL
(389337) 2009 SQ_{318}	20 September 2009	Spacewatch	Kitt Peak	5.177	0.095	3.4	4.687	5.666	7.1 km	–	catalog · MPC · JPL
(389341) 2009 SF_{355}	25 September 2009	Spacewatch	Kitt Peak	5.237	0.109	8.0	4.668	5.807	7.1 km	–	catalog · MPC · JPL
(389342) 2009 TD_{29}	5 September 2008	Spacewatch	Kitt Peak	5.150	0.024	5.6	5.028	5.271	6.9 km	–	catalog · MPC · JPL
(389347) 2009 UK_{11}	28 September 2009	MLS	Mount Lemmon	5.139	0.046	6.1	4.901	5.376	8.2 km	–	catalog · MPC · JPL
(389353) 2009 UC_{60}	23 September 2009	MLS	Mount Lemmon	5.160	0.063	9.3	4.834	5.486	8.4 km	–	catalog · MPC · JPL
(389355) 2009 UE_{80}	3 September 2008	Spacewatch	Kitt Peak	5.175	0.026	8.7	5.039	5.311	7.7 km	–	catalog · MPC · JPL
(389356) 2009 UZ_{93}	22 October 2009	CSS	Catalina	5.250	0.163	14.3	4.394	6.107	10 km	–	catalog · MPC · JPL
(389360) 2009 UD_{155}	26 October 2009	MLS	Mount Lemmon	5.312	0.019	14.2	5.213	5.411	8.9 km	–	catalog · MPC · JPL
(389362) 2009 VG_{5}	8 November 2009	Spacewatch	Kitt Peak	5.203	0.094	5.8	4.714	5.693	6.7 km	–	catalog · MPC · JPL
(389418) 2010 BR_{61}	17 June 2005	MLS	Mount Lemmon	5.243	0.092	15.3	4.763	5.723	13 km	–	catalog · MPC · JPL
(389556) 2010 SD_{6}	16 September 2010	MLS	Mount Lemmon	5.154	0.101	9.3	4.634	5.675	7.6 km	–	catalog · MPC · JPL
(389558) 2010 UX_{25}	17 September 2009	Spacewatch	Kitt Peak	5.151	0.045	9.9	4.918	5.383	9.0 km	–	catalog · MPC · JPL
(389559) 2010 UW_{33}	27 August 2009	Spacewatch	Kitt Peak	5.230	0.118	6.7	4.613	5.848	7.8 km	–	catalog · MPC · JPL
(389560) 2010 UN_{93}	18 September 2009	Spacewatch	Kitt Peak	5.138	0.088	6.8	4.683	5.592	7.2 km	–	catalog · MPC · JPL
(389561) 2010 UV_{97}	16 October 2009	MLS	Mount Lemmon	5.136	0.053	6.6	4.862	5.409	9.0 km	–	catalog · MPC · JPL
(389562) 2010 VR_{38}	14 May 2005	MLS	Mount Lemmon	5.138	0.117	10.7	4.538	5.738	11 km	–	catalog · MPC · JPL
(389563) 2010 VO_{46}	13 October 2010	MLS	Mount Lemmon	5.312	0.085	5.1	4.859	5.765	8.8 km	–	catalog · MPC · JPL
(389564) 2010 VK_{47}	16 October 2009	CSS	Catalina	5.229	0.156	10.4	4.415	6.043	8.5 km	–	catalog · MPC · JPL
(389565) 2010 VR_{109}	15 September 2009	Spacewatch	Kitt Peak	5.202	0.080	7.1	4.788	5.616	6.7 km	–	catalog · MPC · JPL
(389566) 2010 VN_{138}	10 August 2010	WISE	WISE	5.215	0.165	15.5	4.354	6.076	12 km	–	catalog · MPC · JPL
(389567) 2010 VQ_{141}	6 November 2010	MLS	Mount Lemmon	5.170	0.071	7.0	4.804	5.536	7.5 km	–	catalog · MPC · JPL
(389568) 2010 VQ_{149}	7 April 2003	Spacewatch	Kitt Peak	5.239	0.030	10.2	5.081	5.397	8.0 km	–	catalog · MPC · JPL
(389569) 2010 VG_{157}	13 October 2010	MLS	Mount Lemmon	5.273	0.049	9.1	5.016	5.530	8.1 km	–	catalog · MPC · JPL
(389570) 2010 VQ_{170}	21 September 2009	Spacewatch	Kitt Peak	5.245	0.022	9.8	5.131	5.358	8.6 km	–	catalog · MPC · JPL
(389571) 2010 VZ_{202}	27 September 1997	Spacewatch	Kitt Peak	5.188	0.048	6.6	4.941	5.435	9.3 km	–	catalog · MPC · JPL
(389572) 2010 WN_{4}	18 September 2009	Spacewatch	Kitt Peak	5.265	0.055	3.3	4.974	5.557	7.3 km	–	catalog · MPC · JPL
(389573) 2010 WN_{10}	17 September 2009	Spacewatch	Kitt Peak	5.173	0.047	4.7	4.931	5.415	8.3 km	–	catalog · MPC · JPL
(389574) 2010 WF_{53}	29 October 2010	Spacewatch	Kitt Peak	5.168	0.044	9.5	4.940	5.396	11 km	–	catalog · MPC · JPL
(389575) 2010 XP_{41}	16 October 2009	MLS	Mount Lemmon	5.253	0.084	7.0	4.813	5.693	7.1 km	–	catalog · MPC · JPL
(389810) 2011 UD_{404}	31 October 2011	MLS	Mount Lemmon	5.200	0.074	19.5	4.814	5.586	10 km	–	catalog · MPC · JPL
(389822) 2011 XW_{1}	17 October 2010	MLS	Mount Lemmon	5.092	0.055	4.9	4.814	5.370	7.5 km	–	catalog · MPC · JPL
(389823) 2011 YP_{24}	25 December 2011	Spacewatch	Kitt Peak	5.214	0.011	8.6	5.158	5.271	9.6 km	–	catalog · MPC · JPL
(389824) 2011 YH_{75}	27 December 2011	MLS	Mount Lemmon	5.285	0.076	8.4	4.883	5.686	9.2 km	–	catalog · MPC · JPL
(389825) 2012 AM_{1}	3 September 2008	Spacewatch	Kitt Peak	5.230	0.049	3.7	4.975	5.485	7.8 km	–	catalog · MPC · JPL
(389826) 2012 BU_{60}	19 January 2001	Spacewatch	Kitt Peak	5.272	0.111	28.2	4.685	5.859	10 km	–	catalog · MPC · JPL
(389827) 2012 BN_{96}	7 September 2008	MLS	Mount Lemmon	5.195	0.119	11.3	4.579	5.811	8.9 km	–	catalog · MPC · JPL
(390280) 2012 YT_{8}	25 June 2007	Spacewatch	Kitt Peak	5.236	0.065	15.7	4.894	5.577	9.4 km	–	catalog · MPC · JPL
(390288) 2013 AN_{23}	28 October 2010	MLS	Mount Lemmon	5.208	0.132	3.9	4.523	5.892	7.3 km	–	catalog · MPC · JPL
(390296) 2013 AD_{44}	10 October 2010	MLS	Mount Lemmon	5.216	0.047	10.6	4.969	5.463	9.7 km	–	catalog · MPC · JPL
(390300) 2013 AS_{60}	26 March 2003	Spacewatch	Kitt Peak	5.141	0.075	1.8	4.758	5.525	7.3 km	–	catalog · MPC · JPL
(390301) 2013 AG_{64}	17 October 2010	MLS	Mount Lemmon	5.213	0.087	11.3	4.762	5.664	11 km	–	catalog · MPC · JPL
(390303) 2013 AO_{76}	6 January 2000	Spacewatch	Kitt Peak	5.166	0.021	10.7	5.057	5.275	10 km	–	catalog · MPC · JPL
(390308) 2013 AL_{99}	18 November 2011	Spacewatch	Kitt Peak	5.217	0.137	13.1	4.502	5.931	11 km	–	catalog · MPC · JPL
(390309) 2013 AV_{106}	21 June 2007	MLS	Mount Lemmon	5.237	0.077	12.8	4.834	5.640	12 km	–	catalog · MPC · JPL
(390311) 2013 AE_{112}	14 November 2010	CSS	Catalina	5.241	0.074	11.3	4.851	5.631	11 km	–	catalog · MPC · JPL
(390316) 2013 AG_{132}	5 March 2002	Spacewatch	Kitt Peak	5.248	0.092	13.3	4.766	5.730	9.2 km	–	catalog · MPC · JPL
(390317) 2013 AB_{133}	8 November 2010	MLS	Mount Lemmon	5.325	0.049	10.6	5.062	5.589	9.7 km	–	catalog · MPC · JPL
(390322) 2013 BA_{1}	17 October 2009	MLS	Mount Lemmon	5.147	0.010	8.2	5.095	5.200	9.9 km	–	catalog · MPC · JPL
(390323) 2013 BB_{1}	18 October 1998	Spacewatch	Kitt Peak	5.170	0.067	4.7	4.825	5.515	8.1 km	–	catalog · MPC · JPL
(390325) 2013 BQ_{17}	10 September 2007	MLS	Mount Lemmon	5.194	0.116	1.9	4.589	5.799	8.1 km	–	catalog · MPC · JPL
(390326) 2013 BR_{17}	19 September 2009	MLS	Mount Lemmon	5.221	0.044	8.1	4.991	5.451	7.1 km	–	catalog · MPC · JPL
(390328) 2013 BJ_{60}	29 September 2009	MLS	Mount Lemmon	5.256	0.060	9.5	4.940	5.572	9.9 km	–	catalog · MPC · JPL
(390329) 2013 BZ_{61}	15 September 2009	Spacewatch	Kitt Peak	5.158	0.077	1.2	4.759	5.558	7.1 km	–	catalog · MPC · JPL
(390330) 2013 BG_{62}	28 December 2000	Spacewatch	Kitt Peak	5.173	0.079	6.6	4.764	5.582	9.0 km	–	catalog · MPC · JPL
(390331) 2013 BG_{64}	13 September 2007	MLS	Mount Lemmon	5.260	0.080	11.8	4.838	5.683	8.5 km	–	catalog · MPC · JPL
(390333) 2013 CK_{10}	12 October 2010	MLS	Mount Lemmon	5.168	0.132	5.2	4.487	5.848	7.6 km	–	catalog · MPC · JPL
(390334) 2013 CF_{14}	3 January 2001	Spacewatch	Kitt Peak	5.159	0.015	3.1	5.081	5.237	7.9 km	–	catalog · MPC · JPL
(390336) 2013 CX_{43}	28 September 2009	MLS	Mount Lemmon	5.225	0.079	6.2	4.810	5.641	8.7 km	–	catalog · MPC · JPL
(390337) 2013 CE_{58}	4 September 2008	Spacewatch	Kitt Peak	5.230	0.105	17.8	4.681	5.779	12 km	–	catalog · MPC · JPL
(390338) 2013 CF_{71}	2 February 2001	Spacewatch	Kitt Peak	5.262	0.029	7.9	5.107	5.417	9.2 km	–	catalog · MPC · JPL
(390339) 2013 CC_{74}	14 November 2010	MLS	Mount Lemmon	5.249	0.055	7.9	4.963	5.536	8.3 km	–	catalog · MPC · JPL
(390340) 2013 CD_{77}	29 January 2010	WISE	WISE	5.181	0.020	18.4	5.078	5.283	10 km	–	catalog · MPC · JPL
(390344) 2013 CP_{95}	10 September 2007	MLS	Mount Lemmon	5.190	0.017	6.4	5.100	5.280	7.9 km	–	catalog · MPC · JPL
(390345) 2013 CA_{105}	5 January 2000	Spacewatch	Kitt Peak	5.341	0.087	4.6	4.879	5.803	7.0 km	–	catalog · MPC · JPL
(390346) 2013 CY_{109}	27 September 2009	MLS	Mount Lemmon	5.127	0.167	7.0	4.270	5.985	7.1 km	–	catalog · MPC · JPL
(390347) 2013 CU_{111}	4 December 2010	MLS	Mount Lemmon	5.293	0.081	8.4	4.863	5.723	8.5 km	–	catalog · MPC · JPL
(390349) 2013 CG_{140}	13 May 2004	Spacewatch	Kitt Peak	5.133	0.089	8.9	4.678	5.588	8.7 km	–	catalog · MPC · JPL
(390350) 2013 CU_{141}	24 August 2008	Spacewatch	Kitt Peak	5.216	0.043	9.8	4.991	5.441	7.5 km	–	catalog · MPC · JPL
(390351) 2013 CC_{143}	20 September 2009	MLS	Mount Lemmon	5.192	0.088	4.2	4.734	5.649	7.3 km	–	catalog · MPC · JPL
(390352) 2013 CY_{173}	4 September 2008	Spacewatch	Kitt Peak	5.210	0.089	7.8	4.748	5.671	7.4 km	–	catalog · MPC · JPL
(390353) 2013 CB_{178}	18 October 2009	CSS	Catalina	5.132	0.112	30.1	4.558	5.705	11 km	–	catalog · MPC · JPL
(390354) 2013 CS_{178}	3 October 1997	ODAS	Caussols	5.235	0.121	9.8	4.603	5.866	11 km	–	catalog · MPC · JPL
(390357) 2013 CM_{196}	15 September 2009	Spacewatch	Kitt Peak	5.131	0.071	4.7	4.766	5.496	7.3 km	–	catalog · MPC · JPL
(390358) 2013 CC_{207}	16 January 2000	Spacewatch	Kitt Peak	5.314	0.100	6.1	4.784	5.844	8.3 km	–	catalog · MPC · JPL
(390360) 2013 CY_{210}	4 September 2008	Spacewatch	Kitt Peak	5.224	0.031	7.0	5.064	5.385	7.7 km	–	catalog · MPC · JPL
(390361) 2013 CO_{212}	23 March 2003	Spacewatch	Kitt Peak	5.110	0.075	11.7	4.725	5.494	9.2 km	–	catalog · MPC · JPL
(390362) 2013 CQ_{217}	10 September 2007	MLS	Mount Lemmon	5.281	0.006	7.5	5.249	5.313	8.1 km	–	catalog · MPC · JPL
(390363) 2013 DU_{2}	2 October 2008	MLS	Mount Lemmon	5.277	0.062	4.4	4.951	5.603	8.5 km	–	catalog · MPC · JPL
(390528) 1997 SV_{11}	27 September 1997	Spacewatch	Kitt Peak	5.173	0.141	4.7	4.443	5.903	7.3 km	–	catalog · MPC · JPL
(391536) 2007 RC_{309}	10 September 2007	MLS	Mount Lemmon	5.288	0.047	8.9	5.042	5.535	8.1 km	–	catalog · MPC · JPL
(391790) 2008 RU_{43}	2 September 2008	Spacewatch	Kitt Peak	5.302	0.103	6.8	4.758	5.846	8.7 km	–	catalog · MPC · JPL
(391792) 2008 RE_{70}	5 September 2008	Spacewatch	Kitt Peak	5.301	0.017	7.7	5.209	5.392	8.5 km	–	catalog · MPC · JPL
(391802) 2008 RZ_{113}	6 September 2008	Spacewatch	Kitt Peak	5.310	0.030	12.8	5.153	5.468	9.1 km	–	catalog · MPC · JPL
(391804) 2008 RM_{126}	3 September 2008	Spacewatch	Kitt Peak	5.182	0.020	7.7	5.077	5.287	7.2 km	–	catalog · MPC · JPL
(391806) 2008 RS_{128}	2 September 2008	Spacewatch	Kitt Peak	5.261	0.011	4.3	5.205	5.317	7.1 km	–	catalog · MPC · JPL
(391822) 2008 SD_{49}	2 September 2008	Spacewatch	Kitt Peak	5.237	0.090	13.3	4.766	5.708	7.2 km	–	catalog · MPC · JPL
(391844) 2008 SU_{254}	23 September 2008	Spacewatch	Kitt Peak	5.275	0.025	7.1	5.141	5.409	9.0 km	–	catalog · MPC · JPL
(391845) 2008 SM_{257}	22 September 2008	Spacewatch	Kitt Peak	5.176	0.087	18.2	4.727	5.626	10 km	–	catalog · MPC · JPL
(391870) 2008 TO_{92}	4 October 2008	OAM	La Sagra	5.245	0.089	16.6	4.780	5.711	11 km	–	catalog · MPC · JPL
(391877) 2008 TV_{125}	8 October 2008	MLS	Mount Lemmon	5.199	0.094	5.6	4.708	5.689	8.6 km	–	catalog · MPC · JPL
(391880) 2008 TT_{141}	9 October 2008	MLS	Mount Lemmon	5.206	0.064	15.8	4.873	5.540	7.1 km	–	catalog · MPC · JPL
(392188) 2009 RV_{68}	15 September 2009	Spacewatch	Kitt Peak	5.174	0.048	11.2	4.926	5.422	7.6 km	–	catalog · MPC · JPL
(392189) 2009 SR_{30}	16 September 2009	Spacewatch	Kitt Peak	5.184	0.039	31.8	4.980	5.389	11 km	–	catalog · MPC · JPL
(392192) 2009 SP_{76}	17 September 2009	Spacewatch	Kitt Peak	5.288	0.056	6.4	4.993	5.584	8.0 km	–	catalog · MPC · JPL
(392193) 2009 SQ_{121}	18 September 2009	Spacewatch	Kitt Peak	5.178	0.074	10.2	4.795	5.561	9.1 km	–	catalog · MPC · JPL
(392195) 2009 SD_{140}	15 September 2009	Spacewatch	Kitt Peak	5.176	0.143	11.7	4.435	5.918	8.2 km	–	catalog · MPC · JPL
(392196) 2009 SU_{143}	15 September 2009	Spacewatch	Kitt Peak	5.246	0.067	12.3	4.894	5.598	8.9 km	–	catalog · MPC · JPL
(392197) 2009 SQ_{163}	21 September 2009	Spacewatch	Kitt Peak	5.239	0.026	14.3	5.102	5.376	10 km	–	catalog · MPC · JPL
(392198) 2009 ST_{245}	26 September 2008	MLS	Mount Lemmon	5.280	0.058	13.7	4.974	5.586	9.2 km	–	catalog · MPC · JPL
(392199) 2009 SH_{248}	23 September 2009	Spacewatch	Kitt Peak	5.306	0.042	7.3	5.084	5.529	9.2 km	–	catalog · MPC · JPL
(392200) 2009 SE_{252}	16 September 2009	Spacewatch	Kitt Peak	5.246	0.081	6.7	4.824	5.669	7.2 km	–	catalog · MPC · JPL
(392201) 2009 SL_{257}	21 September 2009	MLS	Mount Lemmon	5.162	0.159	13.7	4.343	5.981	7.9 km	–	catalog · MPC · JPL
(392202) 2009 SV_{262}	23 September 2009	MLS	Mount Lemmon	5.120	0.035	6.4	4.940	5.300	7.2 km	–	catalog · MPC · JPL
(392204) 2009 SR_{296}	15 September 2009	Spacewatch	Kitt Peak	5.175	0.083	6.7	4.744	5.605	8.9 km	–	catalog · MPC · JPL
(392205) 2009 SZ_{299}	17 September 2009	Spacewatch	Kitt Peak	5.207	0.087	6.1	4.754	5.661	9.5 km	–	catalog · MPC · JPL
(392206) 2009 SR_{301}	16 September 2009	Spacewatch	Kitt Peak	5.272	0.097	7.6	4.762	5.781	7.4 km	–	catalog · MPC · JPL
(392207) 2009 SB_{311}	14 February 2002	Spacewatch	Kitt Peak	5.285	0.059	5.0	4.976	5.594	9.9 km	–	catalog · MPC · JPL
(392208) 2009 SQ_{321}	21 September 2009	Spacewatch	Kitt Peak	5.234	0.074	9.6	4.849	5.620	7.4 km	–	catalog · MPC · JPL
(392209) 2009 SV_{346}	25 September 2009	Spacewatch	Kitt Peak	5.113	0.077	17.3	4.721	5.505	7.6 km	–	catalog · MPC · JPL
(392210) 2009 SE_{354}	18 September 2009	Spacewatch	Kitt Peak	5.218	0.036	12.3	5.031	5.404	7.4 km	–	catalog · MPC · JPL
(392216) 2009 UX_{28}	18 October 2009	MLS	Mount Lemmon	5.135	0.050	11.0	4.880	5.390	9.7 km	–	catalog · MPC · JPL
(392217) 2009 UJ_{45}	18 October 2009	MLS	Mount Lemmon	5.234	0.017	13.0	5.146	5.322	9.0 km	–	catalog · MPC · JPL
(392219) 2009 UV_{79}	24 September 2008	MLS	Mount Lemmon	5.184	0.088	8.2	4.730	5.639	7.8 km	–	catalog · MPC · JPL
(392220) 2009 UP_{82}	7 October 2008	MLS	Mount Lemmon	5.218	0.029	11.6	5.066	5.370	9.5 km	–	catalog · MPC · JPL
(392221) 2009 UG_{95}	15 September 2009	Spacewatch	Kitt Peak	5.324	0.035	14.7	5.137	5.512	8.3 km	–	catalog · MPC · JPL
(392222) 2009 UA_{99}	23 October 2009	MLS	Mount Lemmon	5.300	0.039	22.3	5.092	5.508	8.9 km	–	catalog · MPC · JPL
(392223) 2009 UH_{102}	24 October 2009	MLS	Mount Lemmon	5.236	0.058	5.6	4.933	5.540	6.9 km	–	catalog · MPC · JPL
(392224) 2009 US_{106}	7 October 2008	MLS	Mount Lemmon	5.199	0.057	6.7	4.900	5.498	12 km	–	catalog · MPC · JPL
(392226) 2009 UB_{141}	1 November 1997	Spacewatch	Kitt Peak	5.253	0.086	21.5	4.800	5.706	11 km	–	catalog · MPC · JPL
(392227) 2009 VK_{8}	8 November 2009	MLS	Mount Lemmon	5.280	0.078	6.0	4.866	5.694	7.0 km	–	catalog · MPC · JPL
(392238) 2009 WC_{2}	26 September 2009	Spacewatch	Kitt Peak	5.262	0.169	10.6	4.374	6.150	8.0 km	–	catalog · MPC · JPL
(392239) 2009 WP_{12}	16 November 2009	MLS	Mount Lemmon	5.167	0.047	8.5	4.923	5.411	7.6 km	–	catalog · MPC · JPL
(392242) 2009 WP_{36}	17 November 2009	Spacewatch	Kitt Peak	5.153	0.055	12.1	4.871	5.435	7.4 km	–	catalog · MPC · JPL
(392246) 2009 WW_{122}	8 October 2008	Spacewatch	Kitt Peak	5.250	0.049	5.9	4.991	5.508	7.8 km	–	catalog · MPC · JPL
(392280) 2010 AV_{121}	24 September 2008	MLS	Mount Lemmon	5.134	0.055	27.1	4.850	5.417	9.5 km	–	catalog · MPC · JPL
(392309) 2010 CO_{226}	23 November 2009	MLS	Mount Lemmon	5.241	0.073	8.7	4.857	5.625	8.6 km	–	catalog · MPC · JPL
(392446) 2010 TV_{185}	7 September 2008	MLS	Mount Lemmon	5.299	0.084	20.0	4.854	5.743	9.5 km	–	catalog · MPC · JPL
(392449) 2010 UQ_{97}	28 October 2010	MLS	Mount Lemmon	5.104	0.059	9.8	4.804	5.404	9.5 km	–	catalog · MPC · JPL
(392451) 2010 VT_{83}	19 September 2009	Spacewatch	Kitt Peak	5.327	0.062	3.3	5.000	5.655	9.0 km	–	catalog · MPC · JPL
(392452) 2010 VL_{91}	6 November 2010	Spacewatch	Kitt Peak	5.165	0.023	15.6	5.044	5.286	11 km	–	catalog · MPC · JPL
(392453) 2010 VO_{106}	5 November 2010	MLS	Mount Lemmon	5.165	0.086	7.1	4.719	5.611	8.3 km	–	catalog · MPC · JPL
(392454) 2010 VZ_{121}	15 September 2009	Spacewatch	Kitt Peak	5.216	0.015	5.6	5.137	5.294	7.7 km	–	catalog · MPC · JPL
(392455) 2010 VE_{143}	27 August 2009	Spacewatch	Kitt Peak	5.120	0.060	13.1	4.814	5.426	8.3 km	–	catalog · MPC · JPL
(392456) 2010 VB_{164}	17 September 2009	Spacewatch	Kitt Peak	5.235	0.048	9.5	4.981	5.488	8.3 km	–	catalog · MPC · JPL
(392457) 2010 VV_{171}	27 October 2009	MLS	Mount Lemmon	5.258	0.046	9.1	5.015	5.500	8.4 km	–	catalog · MPC · JPL
(392458) 2010 VU_{201}	14 November 2010	MLS	Mount Lemmon	5.226	0.056	10.0	4.932	5.520	7.8 km	–	catalog · MPC · JPL
(392459) 2010 WE_{20}	21 September 2009	Spacewatch	Kitt Peak	5.233	0.055	10.2	4.946	5.519	7.7 km	–	catalog · MPC · JPL
(392460) 2010 XY_{9}	8 November 2010	MLS	Mount Lemmon	5.286	0.077	8.4	4.879	5.694	7.1 km	–	catalog · MPC · JPL
(392461) 2010 XT_{65}	25 September 2009	Spacewatch	Kitt Peak	5.307	0.056	8.6	5.008	5.606	8.8 km	–	catalog · MPC · JPL
(392462) 2010 XB_{77}	6 November 2010	MLS	Mount Lemmon	5.287	0.071	8.7	4.909	5.664	8.0 km	–	catalog · MPC · JPL
(392690) 2011 WW_{42}	12 October 2010	MLS	Mount Lemmon	5.203	0.053	11.2	4.926	5.480	7.9 km	–	catalog · MPC · JPL
(392700) 2011 YA_{14}	24 August 2008	Spacewatch	Kitt Peak	5.169	0.046	7.5	4.929	5.408	8.0 km	–	catalog · MPC · JPL
(392701) 2011 YK_{45}	28 September 2008	MLS	Mount Lemmon	5.204	0.058	5.7	4.904	5.504	7.7 km	–	catalog · MPC · JPL
(392703) 2011 YD_{71}	2 November 2010	MLS	Mount Lemmon	5.202	0.093	8.8	4.719	5.685	8.3 km	–	catalog · MPC · JPL
(392712) 2012 BX_{136}	2 February 2010	WISE	WISE	5.180	0.068	23.2	4.828	5.531	13 km	–	catalog · MPC · JPL
(392718) 2012 KN	15 January 2010	WISE	WISE	5.351	0.054	30.5	5.065	5.638	11 km	–	catalog · MPC · JPL
(393020) 2012 XS_{153}	4 September 2008	Spacewatch	Kitt Peak	5.262	0.034	6.5	5.081	5.444	7.6 km	–	catalog · MPC · JPL
(393050) 2013 AZ_{39}	3 January 2013	MLS	Mount Lemmon	5.196	0.033	11.4	5.024	5.368	11 km	–	catalog · MPC · JPL
(393059) 2013 AD_{70}	21 June 2007	MLS	Mount Lemmon	5.167	0.093	12.8	4.684	5.650	11 km	–	catalog · MPC · JPL
(393097) 2013 AF_{132}	17 September 2009	Spacewatch	Kitt Peak	5.292	0.071	8.5	4.919	5.665	10 km	–	catalog · MPC · JPL
(393098) 2013 AJ_{132}	30 December 2000	Spacewatch	Kitt Peak	5.147	0.194	2.7	4.147	6.147	6.8 km	–	catalog · MPC · JPL
(393099) 2013 AZ_{132}	30 October 2010	MLS	Mount Lemmon	5.204	0.069	10.0	4.843	5.565	11 km	–	catalog · MPC · JPL
(393100) 2013 AL_{133}	6 September 2008	MLS	Mount Lemmon	5.245	0.087	10.0	4.790	5.700	9.7 km	–	catalog · MPC · JPL
(393107) 2013 BO	18 November 2011	Spacewatch	Kitt Peak	5.125	0.049	18.6	4.874	5.375	12 km	–	catalog · MPC · JPL
(393108) 2013 BW	24 September 2009	MLS	Mount Lemmon	5.194	0.074	5.9	4.810	5.577	8.6 km	–	catalog · MPC · JPL
(393109) 2013 BW_{1}	7 February 2002	Spacewatch	Kitt Peak	5.211	0.061	9.1	4.894	5.529	8.1 km	–	catalog · MPC · JPL
(393135) 2013 BU_{48}	17 October 2010	MLS	Mount Lemmon	5.131	0.069	2.1	4.775	5.486	7.2 km	–	catalog · MPC · JPL
(393144) 2013 BT_{60}	29 September 2009	MLS	Mount Lemmon	5.281	0.070	8.4	4.911	5.650	8.5 km	–	catalog · MPC · JPL
(393149) 2013 BR_{75}	19 September 2008	Spacewatch	Kitt Peak	5.175	0.028	4.4	5.029	5.322	7.8 km	–	catalog · MPC · JPL
(393155) 2013 CM_{15}	18 September 2009	Spacewatch	Kitt Peak	5.195	0.104	3.4	4.655	5.735	6.5 km	–	catalog · MPC · JPL
(393156) 2013 CV_{15}	2 January 2012	MLS	Mount Lemmon	5.178	0.037	11.1	4.987	5.369	6.6 km	–	catalog · MPC · JPL
(393157) 2013 CD_{16}	24 January 2001	Spacewatch	Kitt Peak	5.280	0.090	22.7	4.803	5.756	12 km	–	catalog · MPC · JPL
(393165) 2013 CE_{30}	29 September 2009	MLS	Mount Lemmon	5.186	0.077	9.9	4.788	5.583	7.6 km	–	catalog · MPC · JPL
(393170) 2013 CW_{43}	27 September 2009	MLS	Mount Lemmon	5.286	0.037	9.9	5.091	5.482	8.5 km	–	catalog · MPC · JPL
(393177) 2013 CW_{70}	17 October 2010	MLS	Mount Lemmon	5.173	0.182	7.3	4.233	6.114	6.7 km	–	catalog · MPC · JPL
(393182) 2013 CU_{100}	17 February 2001	Spacewatch	Kitt Peak	5.252	0.075	15.4	4.860	5.643	9.5 km	–	catalog · MPC · JPL
(393186) 2013 CF_{115}	11 September 2007	Spacewatch	Kitt Peak	5.293	0.100	12.9	4.765	5.822	10 km	–	catalog · MPC · JPL
(393199) 2013 CN_{185}	24 April 2004	Spacewatch	Kitt Peak	5.179	0.039	12.1	4.979	5.379	9.7 km	–	catalog · MPC · JPL
(393200) 2013 CL_{197}	31 December 2011	MLS	Mount Lemmon	5.206	0.105	12.4	4.659	5.754	7.8 km	–	catalog · MPC · JPL
(393202) 2013 CC_{204}	2 October 2008	MLS	Mount Lemmon	5.249	0.051	3.7	4.984	5.514	8.1 km	–	catalog · MPC · JPL
(393205) 2013 CW_{206}	26 September 2009	Spacewatch	Kitt Peak	5.225	0.128	6.2	4.555	5.895	6.9 km	–	catalog · MPC · JPL
(393206) 2013 CM_{210}	5 September 2008	Spacewatch	Kitt Peak	5.115	0.033	8.2	4.946	5.285	6.9 km	–	catalog · MPC · JPL
(393208) 2013 CG_{214}	16 September 2009	Spacewatch	Kitt Peak	5.194	0.098	2.0	4.687	5.702	7.0 km	–	catalog · MPC · JPL
(393209) 2013 CC_{222}	26 July 1995	Spacewatch	Kitt Peak	5.192	0.071	7.6	4.821	5.562	7.4 km	–	catalog · MPC · JPL
(393211) 2013 DF_{2}	12 October 2010	MLS	Mount Lemmon	5.202	0.113	4.5	4.617	5.788	8.1 km	–	catalog · MPC · JPL
(393215) 2013 EO_{15}	18 October 2007	Spacewatch	Kitt Peak	5.193	0.076	27.3	4.800	5.585	11 km	–	catalog · MPC · JPL
(393216) 2013 EH_{16}	28 January 2000	Spacewatch	Kitt Peak	5.223	0.029	6.2	5.074	5.372	7.5 km	–	catalog · MPC · JPL
(393225) 2013 FL_{4}	4 September 2008	Spacewatch	Kitt Peak	5.235	0.059	23.2	4.924	5.546	9.9 km	–	catalog · MPC · JPL
(393474) 2002 EQ_{161}	6 March 2002	NEAT	Palomar	5.210	0.040	32.5	5.004	5.417	11 km	–	catalog · MPC · JPL
(394798) 2008 RA_{8}	3 September 2008	Spacewatch	Kitt Peak	5.230	0.077	15.2	4.829	5.631	8.0 km	–	catalog · MPC · JPL
(394808) 2008 RV_{124}	6 September 2008	Spacewatch	Kitt Peak	5.153	0.043	9.1	4.934	5.372	7.0 km	–	catalog · MPC · JPL
(394821) 2008 SD_{74}	23 September 2008	Spacewatch	Kitt Peak	5.228	0.075	10.4	4.838	5.618	10 km	–	catalog · MPC · JPL
(394869) 2008 TP_{173}	1 October 2008	MLS	Mount Lemmon	5.258	0.108	20.5	4.690	5.826	7.8 km	–	catalog · MPC · JPL
(395105) 2009 RK_{64}	15 September 2009	Spacewatch	Kitt Peak	5.174	0.055	10.6	4.888	5.460	7.6 km	–	catalog · MPC · JPL
(395110) 2009 UX_{148}	28 September 2009	MLS	Mount Lemmon	5.231	0.117	8.1	4.617	5.845	7.2 km	–	catalog · MPC · JPL
(395115) 2009 VW_{96}	8 November 2009	MLS	Mount Lemmon	5.268	0.025	3.4	5.134	5.401	6.6 km	–	catalog · MPC · JPL
(395140) 2010 BL_{93}	30 October 2009	MLS	Mount Lemmon	5.174	0.092	17.8	4.700	5.648	10 km	–	catalog · MPC · JPL
(395166) 2010 CE_{203}	10 November 2009	MLS	Mount Lemmon	5.191	0.042	16.0	4.970	5.411	14 km	–	catalog · MPC · JPL
(395281) 2010 VM_{89}	21 September 2009	CSS	Catalina	5.171	0.111	8.4	4.598	5.743	8.7 km	–	catalog · MPC · JPL
(395285) 2010 XL_{87}	14 May 2004	Spacewatch	Kitt Peak	5.233	0.118	18.3	4.613	5.853	11 km	–	catalog · MPC · JPL
(395672) 2011 WD_{117}	8 May 2005	Spacewatch	Kitt Peak	5.179	0.044	36.6	4.951	5.408	14 km	–	catalog · MPC · JPL
(395692) 2012 AF_{1}	12 November 2010	MLS	Mount Lemmon	5.210	0.115	13.6	4.612	5.808	8.5 km	–	catalog · MPC · JPL
(395695) 2012 AW_{21}	22 October 2009	MLS	Mount Lemmon	5.195	0.057	6.6	4.897	5.493	11 km	–	catalog · MPC · JPL
(395696) 2012 BB_{27}	15 November 2009	CSS	Catalina	5.203	0.120	11.6	4.581	5.826	9.6 km	–	catalog · MPC · JPL
(396108) 2013 CM_{149}	13 September 2007	MLS	Mount Lemmon	5.219	0.058	10.7	4.917	5.521	9.1 km	–	catalog · MPC · JPL
(396133) 2013 CE_{214}	15 September 2007	MLS	Mount Lemmon	5.172	0.065	9.1	4.835	5.509	7.8 km	–	catalog · MPC · JPL
(396134) 2013 CW_{214}	9 October 2008	MLS	Mount Lemmon	5.178	0.045	8.5	4.945	5.410	7.2 km	–	catalog · MPC · JPL
(396140) 2013 DU_{5}	20 January 2012	MLS	Mount Lemmon	5.233	0.015	7.7	5.155	5.311	7.1 km	–	catalog · MPC · JPL
(396158) 2013 EE_{35}	24 September 2008	Spacewatch	Kitt Peak	5.196	0.075	4.4	4.808	5.583	7.1 km	–	catalog · MPC · JPL
(396159) 2013 EA_{41}	21 September 2009	MLS	Mount Lemmon	5.175	0.079	7.6	4.766	5.584	7.4 km	–	catalog · MPC · JPL
(396294) 2014 DK_{20}	14 February 2002	Spacewatch	Kitt Peak	5.179	0.142	6.3	4.441	5.916	8.2 km	–	catalog · MPC · JPL
(396350) 2014 DG_{79}	23 September 2008	Spacewatch	Kitt Peak	5.123	0.013	6.8	5.058	5.188	8.5 km	–	catalog · MPC · JPL
(396395) 2014 DZ_{130}	24 September 2008	MLS	Mount Lemmon	5.269	0.038	3.4	5.069	5.470	7.4 km	–	catalog · MPC · JPL
(396405) 2014 EW_{4}	29 September 2009	MLS	Mount Lemmon	5.197	0.073	7.2	4.819	5.575	9.4 km	–	catalog · MPC · JPL
(396409) 2014 EG_{8}	10 August 2007	Spacewatch	Kitt Peak	5.151	0.056	20.1	4.860	5.441	9.9 km	–	catalog · MPC · JPL
(396412) 2014 EC_{19}	1 October 2009	MLS	Mount Lemmon	5.250	0.071	9.7	4.876	5.623	8.9 km	–	catalog · MPC · JPL
(396413) 2014 ED_{23}	16 September 2009	Spacewatch	Kitt Peak	5.099	0.019	1.2	5.004	5.194	6.9 km	–	catalog · MPC · JPL
(396650) 2002 EE_{51}	13 February 2002	Spacewatch	Kitt Peak	5.245	0.091	4.0	4.770	5.720	11 km	–	catalog · MPC · JPL
(396816) 2004 QU_{28}	17 August 2004	D. J. Tholen	Mauna Kea	5.198	0.178	8.4	4.275	6.121	8.3 km	–	catalog · MPC · JPL
(398091) 2009 OM_{21}	31 July 2009	Spacewatch	Kitt Peak	5.240	0.091	24.1	4.761	5.720	10 km	–	catalog · MPC · JPL
(398095) 2009 QJ_{65}	31 March 2004	Spacewatch	Kitt Peak	5.125	0.051	20.3	4.863	5.386	12 km	–	catalog · MPC · JPL
(398104) 2009 SQ_{183}	21 September 2009	Spacewatch	Kitt Peak	5.260	0.023	18.6	5.140	5.381	8.5 km	–	catalog · MPC · JPL
(398109) 2009 SD_{248}	22 September 2009	Spacewatch	Kitt Peak	5.308	0.107	4.0	4.740	5.876	6.9 km	–	catalog · MPC · JPL
(398118) 2009 WZ_{107}	17 November 2009	MLS	Mount Lemmon	5.138	0.009	16.5	5.089	5.187	8.2 km	–	catalog · MPC · JPL
(398122) 2010 AX_{87}	28 September 2009	MLS	Mount Lemmon	5.162	0.094	8.4	4.676	5.649	11 km	–	catalog · MPC · JPL
(398286) 2010 UV_{74}	13 October 2010	MLS	Mount Lemmon	5.219	0.098	21.5	4.707	5.731	9.5 km	–	catalog · MPC · JPL
(398297) 2010 VF_{178}	16 October 2009	MLS	Mount Lemmon	5.128	0.026	12.0	4.995	5.262	8.2 km	–	catalog · MPC · JPL
(398616) 2011 YB_{3}	3 November 2010	MLS	Mount Lemmon	5.102	0.085	8.6	4.666	5.538	9.6 km	–	catalog · MPC · JPL
(398740) 2012 YN_{8}	17 October 2010	MLS	Mount Lemmon	5.165	0.086	13.5	4.721	5.610	8.9 km	–	catalog · MPC · JPL
(398753) 2013 AG_{39}	28 September 2009	MLS	Mount Lemmon	5.146	0.056	8.6	4.855	5.437	8.5 km	–	catalog · MPC · JPL
(398791) 2013 AR_{133}	15 September 2009	Spacewatch	Kitt Peak	5.191	0.073	10.0	4.813	5.569	8.3 km	–	catalog · MPC · JPL
(398800) 2013 BZ	19 October 2010	MLS	Mount Lemmon	5.130	0.015	8.5	5.054	5.206	9.7 km	–	catalog · MPC · JPL
(399091) 2014 DG_{32}	17 October 2009	MLS	Mount Lemmon	5.203	0.059	6.2	4.894	5.512	8.9 km	–	catalog · MPC · JPL
(399120) 2014 DL_{122}	24 September 2008	MLS	Mount Lemmon	5.104	0.097	18.5	4.608	5.599	8.5 km	–	catalog · MPC · JPL
(399140) 2014 ES_{20}	16 August 2009	Spacewatch	Kitt Peak	5.124	0.073	7.4	4.751	5.497	9.5 km	–	catalog · MPC · JPL
(399153) 2014 FL_{4}	27 October 2009	MLS	Mount Lemmon	5.258	0.071	9.9	4.885	5.631	11 km	–	catalog · MPC · JPL

back to top
