= List of minor planets: 355001–356000 =

The following is a partial list of minor planets, running from minor-planet number 355001 through 356000, inclusive. The primary data for this and other partial lists is based on JPL's "Small-Body Orbital Elements" and data available from the Minor Planet Center. Critical list information is also provided by the MPC, unless otherwise specified from Lowell Observatory. A detailed description of the table's columns and additional sources are given on the main page including a complete list of every page in this series, and a statistical break-up on the dynamical classification of minor planets.

Also see the summary list of all named bodies in numerical and alphabetical order, and the corresponding naming citations for the number range of this particular list. New namings may only be added to this list after official publication, as the preannouncement of names is condemned by the Working Group for Small Bodies Nomenclature of the International Astronomical Union.

Near-Earth obj.	MBA (inner)	MBA (outer)	Centaur
Mars-crosser	MBA (middle)	Jupiter trojan	Trans-Neptunian obj.
Unclassified

== 355001–355100 ==
Designation			Discovery			Properties		Ref
Permanent	Provisional	Named after	Date	Site	Discoverer(s)	Category	Diam.	Ref
355001	2006 QK_{19}	—	August 17, 2006	Palomar	NEAT	·	2.1 km	MPC · JPL
355002	2006 QB_{20}	—	August 18, 2006	Anderson Mesa	LONEOS	ADE	2.4 km	MPC · JPL
355003	2006 QM_{20}	—	August 18, 2006	Anderson Mesa	LONEOS	EUN	1.4 km	MPC · JPL
355004	2006 QO_{30}	—	August 21, 2006	Socorro	LINEAR	·	2.3 km	MPC · JPL
355005	2006 QT_{30}	—	August 22, 2006	Palomar	NEAT	·	2.9 km	MPC · JPL
355006	2006 QY_{30}	—	August 21, 2006	Socorro	LINEAR	H	690 m	MPC · JPL
355007	2006 QP_{31}	—	August 23, 2006	Pla D'Arguines	R. Ferrando	·	2.0 km	MPC · JPL
355008	2006 QT_{43}	—	August 18, 2006	Kitt Peak	Spacewatch	BRA	2.0 km	MPC · JPL
355009	2006 QJ_{45}	—	August 19, 2006	Kitt Peak	Spacewatch	AEO	1.0 km	MPC · JPL
355010	2006 QN_{46}	—	August 20, 2006	Palomar	NEAT	·	2.1 km	MPC · JPL
355011	2006 QC_{80}	—	August 24, 2006	Palomar	NEAT	·	1.5 km	MPC · JPL
355012	2006 QN_{80}	—	August 24, 2006	Palomar	NEAT	·	1.6 km	MPC · JPL
355013	2006 QE_{82}	—	August 24, 2006	Haleakala	NEAT	·	3.2 km	MPC · JPL
355014	2006 QX_{87}	—	August 27, 2006	Kitt Peak	Spacewatch	·	1.9 km	MPC · JPL
355015	2006 QC_{103}	—	August 19, 2006	Kitt Peak	Spacewatch	·	3.3 km	MPC · JPL
355016	2006 QC_{104}	—	August 27, 2006	Kitt Peak	Spacewatch	·	2.4 km	MPC · JPL
355017	2006 QS_{108}	—	August 28, 2006	Catalina	CSS	·	2.2 km	MPC · JPL
355018	2006 QE_{113}	—	August 24, 2006	Socorro	LINEAR	·	2.2 km	MPC · JPL
355019	2006 QY_{115}	—	August 27, 2006	Anderson Mesa	LONEOS	·	3.8 km	MPC · JPL
355020	2006 QH_{116}	—	August 28, 2006	Catalina	CSS	EUN	1.7 km	MPC · JPL
355021	2006 QM_{137}	—	August 31, 2006	Eskridge	Farpoint	·	1.9 km	MPC · JPL
355022 Triman	2006 QW_{142}	Triman	August 31, 2006	Ottmarsheim	C. Rinner	H	820 m	MPC · JPL
355023	2006 QP_{145}	—	August 18, 2006	Kitt Peak	Spacewatch	·	2.2 km	MPC · JPL
355024	2006 QD_{150}	—	August 19, 2006	Kitt Peak	Spacewatch	·	2.1 km	MPC · JPL
355025	2006 QC_{168}	—	August 30, 2006	Anderson Mesa	LONEOS	BRA	1.4 km	MPC · JPL
355026	2006 QE_{169}	—	August 31, 2006	Črni Vrh	Mikuž, H.	·	3.8 km	MPC · JPL
355027	2006 QO_{182}	—	August 28, 2006	Apache Point	SDSS Collaboration	KOR	1.2 km	MPC · JPL
355028	2006 QM_{187}	—	August 18, 2006	Palomar	NEAT	MIS	3.3 km	MPC · JPL
355029 Herve	2006 RH	Herve	September 1, 2006	Ottmarsheim	C. Rinner	·	2.6 km	MPC · JPL
355030	2006 RR_{2}	—	September 12, 2006	Socorro	LINEAR	·	1.9 km	MPC · JPL
355031	2006 RG_{21}	—	September 15, 2006	Kitt Peak	Spacewatch	·	1.9 km	MPC · JPL
355032	2006 RQ_{24}	—	May 25, 2006	Mount Lemmon	Mount Lemmon Survey	·	2.1 km	MPC · JPL
355033	2006 RC_{26}	—	September 14, 2006	Kitt Peak	Spacewatch	EUN	1.2 km	MPC · JPL
355034	2006 RT_{45}	—	September 14, 2006	Kitt Peak	Spacewatch	KOR	1.4 km	MPC · JPL
355035	2006 RV_{45}	—	September 14, 2006	Kitt Peak	Spacewatch	·	1.8 km	MPC · JPL
355036	2006 RT_{65}	—	September 14, 2006	Catalina	CSS	·	2.1 km	MPC · JPL
355037	2006 RA_{67}	—	September 15, 2006	Kitt Peak	Spacewatch	·	2.4 km	MPC · JPL
355038	2006 RF_{77}	—	September 15, 2006	Kitt Peak	Spacewatch	·	1.7 km	MPC · JPL
355039	2006 RS_{98}	—	September 15, 2006	Kitt Peak	Spacewatch	HOF	2.3 km	MPC · JPL
355040	2006 RZ_{99}	—	September 14, 2006	Palomar	NEAT	·	2.1 km	MPC · JPL
355041	2006 RR_{110}	—	September 19, 2006	Kitt Peak	Spacewatch	·	1.8 km	MPC · JPL
355042	2006 RU_{114}	—	September 14, 2006	Mauna Kea	Masiero, J.	·	1.4 km	MPC · JPL
355043	2006 SG_{3}	—	September 16, 2006	Anderson Mesa	LONEOS	·	2.5 km	MPC · JPL
355044	2006 SU_{8}	—	September 17, 2006	Socorro	LINEAR	·	2.4 km	MPC · JPL
355045	2006 SZ_{17}	—	September 17, 2006	Kitt Peak	Spacewatch	EUN	1.8 km	MPC · JPL
355046	2006 SO_{19}	—	September 18, 2006	Siding Spring	SSS	APO	420 m	MPC · JPL
355047	2006 SR_{23}	—	August 29, 2006	Kitt Peak	Spacewatch	·	1.9 km	MPC · JPL
355048	2006 SF_{55}	—	September 18, 2006	Catalina	CSS	·	3.3 km	MPC · JPL
355049	2006 SG_{61}	—	September 19, 2006	Catalina	CSS	·	2.1 km	MPC · JPL
355050	2006 SG_{67}	—	September 19, 2006	Kitt Peak	Spacewatch	KOR	1.3 km	MPC · JPL
355051	2006 SJ_{70}	—	September 19, 2006	Kitt Peak	Spacewatch	HOF	4.7 km	MPC · JPL
355052	2006 SM_{95}	—	September 18, 2006	Kitt Peak	Spacewatch	·	2.4 km	MPC · JPL
355053	2006 SR_{99}	—	September 18, 2006	Kitt Peak	Spacewatch	AGN	1.1 km	MPC · JPL
355054	2006 SW_{105}	—	September 15, 2006	Kitt Peak	Spacewatch	KOR	1.2 km	MPC · JPL
355055	2006 SO_{123}	—	August 28, 2006	Lulin	LUSS	·	2.4 km	MPC · JPL
355056	2006 SR_{144}	—	September 19, 2006	Kitt Peak	Spacewatch	·	1.9 km	MPC · JPL
355057	2006 SU_{152}	—	September 19, 2006	Kitt Peak	Spacewatch	EUN	1.6 km	MPC · JPL
355058	2006 SJ_{156}	—	September 23, 2006	Kitt Peak	Spacewatch	·	1.6 km	MPC · JPL
355059	2006 SJ_{159}	—	September 23, 2006	Kitt Peak	Spacewatch	HOF	2.7 km	MPC · JPL
355060	2006 SA_{167}	—	September 25, 2006	Kitt Peak	Spacewatch	·	2.1 km	MPC · JPL
355061	2006 SN_{172}	—	September 25, 2006	Kitt Peak	Spacewatch	AGN	1.3 km	MPC · JPL
355062	2006 SE_{181}	—	September 25, 2006	Mount Lemmon	Mount Lemmon Survey	·	1.2 km	MPC · JPL
355063	2006 SZ_{191}	—	September 26, 2006	Mount Lemmon	Mount Lemmon Survey	·	1.4 km	MPC · JPL
355064	2006 SF_{194}	—	September 26, 2006	Kitt Peak	Spacewatch	HOF	2.7 km	MPC · JPL
355065	2006 SE_{195}	—	September 26, 2006	Mount Lemmon	Mount Lemmon Survey	·	2.8 km	MPC · JPL
355066	2006 SJ_{199}	—	September 15, 2006	Kitt Peak	Spacewatch	KOR	1.2 km	MPC · JPL
355067	2006 SD_{209}	—	September 18, 2006	Catalina	CSS	·	1.8 km	MPC · JPL
355068	2006 SC_{219}	—	September 27, 2006	Kitt Peak	Spacewatch	KOR	1.2 km	MPC · JPL
355069	2006 SA_{221}	—	September 25, 2006	Mount Lemmon	Mount Lemmon Survey	·	2.1 km	MPC · JPL
355070	2006 SV_{222}	—	September 25, 2006	Mount Lemmon	Mount Lemmon Survey	·	1.8 km	MPC · JPL
355071	2006 SS_{229}	—	September 26, 2006	Kitt Peak	Spacewatch	·	2.8 km	MPC · JPL
355072	2006 SQ_{241}	—	September 26, 2006	Mount Lemmon	Mount Lemmon Survey	·	1.6 km	MPC · JPL
355073	2006 SL_{255}	—	September 16, 2006	Kitt Peak	Spacewatch	NEM	2.2 km	MPC · JPL
355074	2006 ST_{262}	—	September 26, 2006	Mount Lemmon	Mount Lemmon Survey	·	1.6 km	MPC · JPL
355075	2006 SJ_{264}	—	September 26, 2006	Kitt Peak	Spacewatch	·	2.2 km	MPC · JPL
355076	2006 SP_{268}	—	September 26, 2006	Kitt Peak	Spacewatch	·	2.0 km	MPC · JPL
355077	2006 SK_{285}	—	September 28, 2006	Catalina	CSS	·	2.1 km	MPC · JPL
355078	2006 SE_{304}	—	September 27, 2006	Mount Lemmon	Mount Lemmon Survey	AGN	1.4 km	MPC · JPL
355079	2006 SA_{311}	—	September 17, 2006	Kitt Peak	Spacewatch	HOF	2.8 km	MPC · JPL
355080	2006 SR_{319}	—	September 27, 2006	Kitt Peak	Spacewatch	·	1.9 km	MPC · JPL
355081	2006 SO_{341}	—	September 28, 2006	Kitt Peak	Spacewatch	·	2.2 km	MPC · JPL
355082	2006 SF_{342}	—	September 28, 2006	Kitt Peak	Spacewatch	·	1.9 km	MPC · JPL
355083	2006 SK_{347}	—	September 28, 2006	Kitt Peak	Spacewatch	KOR	1.2 km	MPC · JPL
355084	2006 SZ_{347}	—	September 28, 2006	Kitt Peak	Spacewatch	KOR	1.2 km	MPC · JPL
355085	2006 SG_{378}	—	September 18, 2006	Apache Point	A. C. Becker	·	2.6 km	MPC · JPL
355086	2006 SQ_{384}	—	September 29, 2006	Apache Point	A. C. Becker	·	2.3 km	MPC · JPL
355087	2006 SS_{392}	—	September 26, 2006	Kitt Peak	Spacewatch	·	1.9 km	MPC · JPL
355088	2006 SO_{399}	—	September 17, 2006	Kitt Peak	Spacewatch	·	3.0 km	MPC · JPL
355089	2006 SX_{401}	—	September 25, 2006	Catalina	CSS	·	2.8 km	MPC · JPL
355090	2006 SU_{406}	—	September 19, 2006	Catalina	CSS	·	2.4 km	MPC · JPL
355091	2006 SD_{409}	—	September 30, 2006	Mount Lemmon	Mount Lemmon Survey	KOR	1.2 km	MPC · JPL
355092	2006 TX	—	October 1, 2006	Great Shefford	Birtwhistle, P.	·	2.5 km	MPC · JPL
355093	2006 TL_{12}	—	October 4, 2006	Mount Lemmon	Mount Lemmon Survey	·	2.9 km	MPC · JPL
355094	2006 TQ_{14}	—	October 11, 2006	Kitt Peak	Spacewatch	(16286)	2.2 km	MPC · JPL
355095	2006 TO_{29}	—	October 12, 2006	Kitt Peak	Spacewatch	·	2.3 km	MPC · JPL
355096	2006 TE_{46}	—	October 12, 2006	Kitt Peak	Spacewatch	·	3.0 km	MPC · JPL
355097	2006 TZ_{47}	—	October 12, 2006	Kitt Peak	Spacewatch	·	1.6 km	MPC · JPL
355098	2006 TB_{51}	—	October 12, 2006	Kitt Peak	Spacewatch	·	2.3 km	MPC · JPL
355099	2006 TK_{60}	—	October 13, 2006	Kitt Peak	Spacewatch	·	2.1 km	MPC · JPL
355100	2006 TV_{85}	—	October 13, 2006	Kitt Peak	Spacewatch	EOS	2.0 km	MPC · JPL

== 355101–355200 ==
back to top

Designation			Discovery			Properties		Ref
Permanent	Provisional	Named after	Date	Site	Discoverer(s)	Category	Diam.	Ref
355101	2006 TK_{87}	—	October 13, 2006	Kitt Peak	Spacewatch	·	1.4 km	MPC · JPL
355102	2006 TQ_{89}	—	October 13, 2006	Kitt Peak	Spacewatch	·	1.6 km	MPC · JPL
355103	2006 TM_{102}	—	September 28, 2006	Mount Lemmon	Mount Lemmon Survey	·	1.5 km	MPC · JPL
355104	2006 TM_{126}	—	October 4, 2006	Mount Lemmon	Mount Lemmon Survey	·	2.0 km	MPC · JPL
355105	2006 TO_{127}	—	October 2, 2006	Catalina	CSS	·	2.7 km	MPC · JPL
355106	2006 UR_{12}	—	September 30, 2006	Mount Lemmon	Mount Lemmon Survey	·	1.6 km	MPC · JPL
355107	2006 UV_{12}	—	October 17, 2006	Mount Lemmon	Mount Lemmon Survey	KOR	1.3 km	MPC · JPL
355108	2006 US_{30}	—	October 16, 2006	Kitt Peak	Spacewatch	·	1.6 km	MPC · JPL
355109	2006 UG_{35}	—	October 16, 2006	Kitt Peak	Spacewatch	HOF	2.9 km	MPC · JPL
355110	2006 UR_{36}	—	October 16, 2006	Kitt Peak	Spacewatch	·	1.6 km	MPC · JPL
355111	2006 UA_{45}	—	October 16, 2006	Kitt Peak	Spacewatch	KOR	1.4 km	MPC · JPL
355112	2006 UD_{61}	—	October 19, 2006	Kitt Peak	Spacewatch	·	2.3 km	MPC · JPL
355113	2006 UY_{61}	—	October 18, 2006	Mount Nyukasa	Japan Aerospace Exploration Agency	·	2.3 km	MPC · JPL
355114	2006 UX_{68}	—	October 16, 2006	Catalina	CSS	·	2.3 km	MPC · JPL
355115	2006 UP_{84}	—	October 17, 2006	Mount Lemmon	Mount Lemmon Survey	KOR	1.5 km	MPC · JPL
355116	2006 UU_{85}	—	October 17, 2006	Kitt Peak	Spacewatch	EOS	2.0 km	MPC · JPL
355117	2006 UY_{88}	—	October 17, 2006	Kitt Peak	Spacewatch	·	2.2 km	MPC · JPL
355118	2006 UZ_{96}	—	October 18, 2006	Kitt Peak	Spacewatch	KOR	1.3 km	MPC · JPL
355119	2006 UN_{97}	—	October 18, 2006	Kitt Peak	Spacewatch	·	2.3 km	MPC · JPL
355120	2006 UV_{110}	—	September 17, 2006	Catalina	CSS	PAD	1.9 km	MPC · JPL
355121	2006 UM_{120}	—	October 19, 2006	Kitt Peak	Spacewatch	·	1.8 km	MPC · JPL
355122	2006 UL_{126}	—	October 19, 2006	Kitt Peak	Spacewatch	·	1.7 km	MPC · JPL
355123	2006 UL_{130}	—	October 19, 2006	Kitt Peak	Spacewatch	·	1.8 km	MPC · JPL
355124	2006 UE_{139}	—	October 19, 2006	Kitt Peak	Spacewatch	·	2.2 km	MPC · JPL
355125	2006 UF_{142}	—	October 19, 2006	Kitt Peak	Spacewatch	·	2.6 km	MPC · JPL
355126	2006 UF_{150}	—	October 20, 2006	Catalina	CSS	H	690 m	MPC · JPL
355127	2006 UN_{160}	—	October 21, 2006	Mount Lemmon	Mount Lemmon Survey	KOR	1.4 km	MPC · JPL
355128	2006 UP_{178}	—	October 16, 2006	Catalina	CSS	·	2.2 km	MPC · JPL
355129	2006 UK_{182}	—	October 16, 2006	Catalina	CSS	·	4.0 km	MPC · JPL
355130	2006 UL_{191}	—	October 19, 2006	Catalina	CSS	·	2.7 km	MPC · JPL
355131	2006 UN_{192}	—	October 19, 2006	Catalina	CSS	·	5.1 km	MPC · JPL
355132	2006 UT_{194}	—	October 20, 2006	Kitt Peak	Spacewatch	KOR	1.4 km	MPC · JPL
355133	2006 UK_{203}	—	October 19, 2006	Catalina	CSS	·	2.1 km	MPC · JPL
355134	2006 UW_{204}	—	October 23, 2006	Palomar	NEAT	H	660 m	MPC · JPL
355135	2006 UB_{206}	—	October 23, 2006	Kitt Peak	Spacewatch	·	1.9 km	MPC · JPL
355136	2006 UG_{211}	—	October 23, 2006	Kitt Peak	Spacewatch	EOS	2.3 km	MPC · JPL
355137	2006 UN_{220}	—	September 28, 2006	Kitt Peak	Spacewatch	·	2.1 km	MPC · JPL
355138	2006 UA_{221}	—	October 17, 2006	Kitt Peak	Spacewatch	·	2.1 km	MPC · JPL
355139	2006 UR_{238}	—	October 23, 2006	Kitt Peak	Spacewatch	NAE	2.2 km	MPC · JPL
355140	2006 UQ_{257}	—	October 28, 2006	Mount Lemmon	Mount Lemmon Survey	·	2.1 km	MPC · JPL
355141	2006 UG_{272}	—	October 27, 2006	Mount Lemmon	Mount Lemmon Survey	H	690 m	MPC · JPL
355142	2006 UW_{291}	—	October 16, 2006	Socorro	LINEAR	H	660 m	MPC · JPL
355143	2006 UL_{304}	—	October 19, 2006	Kitt Peak	M. W. Buie	·	1.5 km	MPC · JPL
355144	2006 UY_{330}	—	October 16, 2006	Apache Point	A. C. Becker	·	2.2 km	MPC · JPL
355145	2006 UZ_{343}	—	October 26, 2006	Mauna Kea	P. A. Wiegert	KOR	1.4 km	MPC · JPL
355146	2006 VP_{4}	—	November 9, 2006	Kitt Peak	Spacewatch	·	4.0 km	MPC · JPL
355147	2006 VM_{8}	—	November 11, 2006	Kitt Peak	Spacewatch	THM	2.0 km	MPC · JPL
355148	2006 VC_{15}	—	November 9, 2006	Kitt Peak	Spacewatch	EOS	2.1 km	MPC · JPL
355149	2006 VX_{21}	—	November 10, 2006	Kitt Peak	Spacewatch	·	3.2 km	MPC · JPL
355150	2006 VJ_{26}	—	November 10, 2006	Kitt Peak	Spacewatch	·	2.8 km	MPC · JPL
355151	2006 VJ_{27}	—	November 10, 2006	Kitt Peak	Spacewatch	·	3.0 km	MPC · JPL
355152	2006 VE_{38}	—	October 28, 2006	Kitt Peak	Spacewatch	·	1.9 km	MPC · JPL
355153	2006 VV_{43}	—	November 13, 2006	Kitt Peak	Spacewatch	·	2.2 km	MPC · JPL
355154	2006 VF_{55}	—	October 17, 2006	Mount Lemmon	Mount Lemmon Survey	EOS	1.9 km	MPC · JPL
355155	2006 VA_{58}	—	November 11, 2006	Kitt Peak	Spacewatch	·	4.2 km	MPC · JPL
355156	2006 VD_{66}	—	November 11, 2006	Kitt Peak	Spacewatch	KOR	1.5 km	MPC · JPL
355157	2006 VR_{76}	—	November 12, 2006	Mount Lemmon	Mount Lemmon Survey	KOR	1.3 km	MPC · JPL
355158	2006 VV_{77}	—	November 12, 2006	Mount Lemmon	Mount Lemmon Survey	KOR	1.3 km	MPC · JPL
355159	2006 VN_{78}	—	November 12, 2006	Mount Lemmon	Mount Lemmon Survey	·	2.6 km	MPC · JPL
355160	2006 VR_{97}	—	November 11, 2006	Kitt Peak	Spacewatch	·	2.3 km	MPC · JPL
355161	2006 VS_{97}	—	November 11, 2006	Kitt Peak	Spacewatch	·	2.5 km	MPC · JPL
355162	2006 VC_{103}	—	November 12, 2006	Mount Lemmon	Mount Lemmon Survey	EOS	2.2 km	MPC · JPL
355163	2006 VV_{112}	—	November 13, 2006	Kitt Peak	Spacewatch	·	2.6 km	MPC · JPL
355164	2006 VP_{136}	—	November 15, 2006	Kitt Peak	Spacewatch	THM	1.8 km	MPC · JPL
355165	2006 VK_{139}	—	November 11, 2006	Mount Lemmon	Mount Lemmon Survey	·	2.3 km	MPC · JPL
355166	2006 VP_{169}	—	November 11, 2006	Kitt Peak	Spacewatch	THM	2.1 km	MPC · JPL
355167	2006 VR_{170}	—	November 10, 2006	Kitt Peak	Spacewatch	EOS	2.4 km	MPC · JPL
355168	2006 WG_{4}	—	November 19, 2006	Kitt Peak	Spacewatch	·	2.9 km	MPC · JPL
355169	2006 WG_{7}	—	November 16, 2006	Kitt Peak	Spacewatch	·	2.4 km	MPC · JPL
355170	2006 WG_{11}	—	November 16, 2006	Socorro	LINEAR	TIR	3.0 km	MPC · JPL
355171	2006 WQ_{11}	—	November 16, 2006	Socorro	LINEAR	·	2.9 km	MPC · JPL
355172	2006 WZ_{12}	—	November 16, 2006	Mount Lemmon	Mount Lemmon Survey	EOS	4.1 km	MPC · JPL
355173	2006 WG_{18}	—	November 17, 2006	Mount Lemmon	Mount Lemmon Survey	AGN	1.2 km	MPC · JPL
355174	2006 WK_{20}	—	November 17, 2006	Mount Lemmon	Mount Lemmon Survey	·	2.4 km	MPC · JPL
355175	2006 WV_{47}	—	November 16, 2006	Kitt Peak	Spacewatch	·	2.6 km	MPC · JPL
355176	2006 WA_{48}	—	November 16, 2006	Mount Lemmon	Mount Lemmon Survey	·	2.4 km	MPC · JPL
355177	2006 WP_{53}	—	November 16, 2006	Socorro	LINEAR	·	3.8 km	MPC · JPL
355178	2006 WE_{55}	—	November 16, 2006	Kitt Peak	Spacewatch	·	3.8 km	MPC · JPL
355179	2006 WN_{73}	—	November 18, 2006	Kitt Peak	Spacewatch	·	1.9 km	MPC · JPL
355180	2006 WR_{81}	—	November 18, 2006	Kitt Peak	Spacewatch	THM	2.2 km	MPC · JPL
355181	2006 WO_{89}	—	November 18, 2006	Socorro	LINEAR	·	4.5 km	MPC · JPL
355182	2006 WQ_{92}	—	November 19, 2006	Kitt Peak	Spacewatch	·	1.9 km	MPC · JPL
355183	2006 WT_{102}	—	November 19, 2006	Kitt Peak	Spacewatch	·	1.7 km	MPC · JPL
355184	2006 WO_{109}	—	November 11, 2006	Kitt Peak	Spacewatch	·	2.2 km	MPC · JPL
355185	2006 WD_{111}	—	November 19, 2006	Kitt Peak	Spacewatch	EOS	1.9 km	MPC · JPL
355186	2006 WX_{115}	—	November 20, 2006	Mount Lemmon	Mount Lemmon Survey	·	2.6 km	MPC · JPL
355187	2006 WZ_{139}	—	November 19, 2006	Catalina	CSS	·	2.4 km	MPC · JPL
355188	2006 WM_{158}	—	November 22, 2006	Socorro	LINEAR	LIX	3.4 km	MPC · JPL
355189	2006 WN_{160}	—	November 22, 2006	Kitt Peak	Spacewatch	·	3.5 km	MPC · JPL
355190	2006 WN_{180}	—	November 24, 2006	Mount Lemmon	Mount Lemmon Survey	·	2.0 km	MPC · JPL
355191	2006 WS_{188}	—	November 24, 2006	Kitt Peak	Spacewatch	EOS	1.9 km	MPC · JPL
355192	2006 WV_{190}	—	November 25, 2006	Kitt Peak	Spacewatch	THM	2.1 km	MPC · JPL
355193	2006 WA_{198}	—	November 17, 2006	Mount Lemmon	Mount Lemmon Survey	·	3.0 km	MPC · JPL
355194	2006 WO_{202}	—	November 27, 2006	Mount Lemmon	Mount Lemmon Survey	·	5.1 km	MPC · JPL
355195	2006 XX_{5}	—	December 7, 2006	Palomar	NEAT	·	4.1 km	MPC · JPL
355196	2006 XY_{7}	—	December 9, 2006	Palomar	NEAT	·	2.4 km	MPC · JPL
355197	2006 XR_{16}	—	December 10, 2006	Kitt Peak	Spacewatch	EOS	2.3 km	MPC · JPL
355198	2006 XY_{23}	—	December 12, 2006	Mount Lemmon	Mount Lemmon Survey	·	2.2 km	MPC · JPL
355199	2006 XW_{30}	—	December 13, 2006	Kitt Peak	Spacewatch	·	3.1 km	MPC · JPL
355200	2006 XN_{36}	—	December 11, 2006	Kitt Peak	Spacewatch	THM	2.3 km	MPC · JPL

== 355201–355300 ==
back to top

Designation			Discovery			Properties		Ref
Permanent	Provisional	Named after	Date	Site	Discoverer(s)	Category	Diam.	Ref
355201	2006 XA_{45}	—	December 13, 2006	Kitt Peak	Spacewatch	THM	2.1 km	MPC · JPL
355202	2006 XC_{52}	—	November 18, 2006	Kitt Peak	Spacewatch	·	3.4 km	MPC · JPL
355203	2006 XM_{65}	—	November 16, 2006	Lulin	LUSS	·	3.8 km	MPC · JPL
355204	2006 XZ_{69}	—	December 11, 2006	Kitt Peak	Spacewatch	EOS	2.5 km	MPC · JPL
355205	2006 XF_{71}	—	December 15, 2006	Kitt Peak	Spacewatch	·	3.9 km	MPC · JPL
355206	2006 YA_{8}	—	December 20, 2006	Mount Lemmon	Mount Lemmon Survey	·	3.9 km	MPC · JPL
355207	2006 YJ_{9}	—	December 5, 2006	Palomar	NEAT	THB	3.5 km	MPC · JPL
355208	2006 YR_{13}	—	December 24, 2006	Kitt Peak	Spacewatch	·	5.3 km	MPC · JPL
355209	2006 YR_{15}	—	December 20, 2006	Mount Lemmon	Mount Lemmon Survey	THB	2.9 km	MPC · JPL
355210	2006 YF_{33}	—	December 21, 2006	Kitt Peak	Spacewatch	slow	3.8 km	MPC · JPL
355211	2006 YS_{34}	—	December 21, 2006	Kitt Peak	Spacewatch	·	3.5 km	MPC · JPL
355212	2006 YV_{38}	—	December 21, 2006	Kitt Peak	Spacewatch	·	3.5 km	MPC · JPL
355213	2006 YH_{48}	—	December 24, 2006	Kitt Peak	Spacewatch	·	3.7 km	MPC · JPL
355214	2006 YK_{48}	—	December 24, 2006	Kitt Peak	Spacewatch	·	4.0 km	MPC · JPL
355215	2006 YM_{52}	—	December 27, 2006	Mount Lemmon	Mount Lemmon Survey	·	3.4 km	MPC · JPL
355216	2006 YH_{53}	—	December 21, 2006	Mount Lemmon	Mount Lemmon Survey	·	2.7 km	MPC · JPL
355217	2006 YF_{54}	—	December 27, 2006	Mount Lemmon	Mount Lemmon Survey	HYG	2.9 km	MPC · JPL
355218	2007 AN_{1}	—	January 8, 2007	Mount Lemmon	Mount Lemmon Survey	·	5.0 km	MPC · JPL
355219	2007 AP_{21}	—	December 24, 2006	Kitt Peak	Spacewatch	·	3.2 km	MPC · JPL
355220	2007 AF_{23}	—	January 10, 2007	Mount Lemmon	Mount Lemmon Survey	LUT	6.2 km	MPC · JPL
355221	2007 AW_{27}	—	January 8, 2007	Mount Lemmon	Mount Lemmon Survey	·	3.0 km	MPC · JPL
355222	2007 BT_{4}	—	January 16, 2007	Anderson Mesa	LONEOS	(895)	5.3 km	MPC · JPL
355223	2007 BM_{6}	—	January 17, 2007	Palomar	NEAT	·	4.0 km	MPC · JPL
355224	2007 BO_{6}	—	January 17, 2007	Palomar	NEAT	·	4.9 km	MPC · JPL
355225	2007 BK_{15}	—	January 17, 2007	Kitt Peak	Spacewatch	·	3.4 km	MPC · JPL
355226	2007 BX_{34}	—	January 24, 2007	Mount Lemmon	Mount Lemmon Survey	·	5.7 km	MPC · JPL
355227	2007 BZ_{58}	—	November 28, 2006	Mount Lemmon	Mount Lemmon Survey	URS	3.5 km	MPC · JPL
355228	2007 BT_{60}	—	January 26, 2007	Kitt Peak	Spacewatch	·	4.4 km	MPC · JPL
355229	2007 BV_{60}	—	January 27, 2007	Mount Lemmon	Mount Lemmon Survey	·	3.6 km	MPC · JPL
355230	2007 BR_{62}	—	January 27, 2007	Mount Lemmon	Mount Lemmon Survey	·	3.0 km	MPC · JPL
355231	2007 BQ_{80}	—	January 17, 2007	Kitt Peak	Spacewatch	·	3.8 km	MPC · JPL
355232	2007 BU_{80}	—	January 17, 2007	Kitt Peak	Spacewatch	·	4.7 km	MPC · JPL
355233	2007 BN_{92}	—	January 19, 2007	Mauna Kea	Mauna Kea	·	3.5 km	MPC · JPL
355234	2007 BA_{100}	—	January 17, 2007	Kitt Peak	Spacewatch	VER	3.5 km	MPC · JPL
355235	2007 CT_{6}	—	February 6, 2007	Kitt Peak	Spacewatch	·	3.1 km	MPC · JPL
355236	2007 CW_{27}	—	February 6, 2007	Kitt Peak	Spacewatch	·	3.3 km	MPC · JPL
355237	2007 CY_{28}	—	February 6, 2007	Palomar	NEAT	·	2.4 km	MPC · JPL
355238	2007 CS_{32}	—	February 6, 2007	Mount Lemmon	Mount Lemmon Survey	·	3.5 km	MPC · JPL
355239	2007 CL_{55}	—	February 10, 2007	Mount Lemmon	Mount Lemmon Survey	VER	2.7 km	MPC · JPL
355240	2007 DA_{2}	—	February 16, 2007	Mount Lemmon	Mount Lemmon Survey	·	2.9 km	MPC · JPL
355241	2007 DJ_{2}	—	February 16, 2007	Catalina	CSS	LUT	6.3 km	MPC · JPL
355242	2007 DG_{11}	—	February 17, 2007	Kitt Peak	Spacewatch	SYL · CYB	5.4 km	MPC · JPL
355243	2007 DK_{41}	—	February 20, 2007	Lulin	LUSS	·	4.3 km	MPC · JPL
355244	2007 DD_{54}	—	February 21, 2007	Kitt Peak	Spacewatch	·	4.9 km	MPC · JPL
355245	2007 EA_{107}	—	May 4, 2002	Palomar	NEAT	HYG	3.2 km	MPC · JPL
355246	2007 EO_{168}	—	March 13, 2007	Kitt Peak	Spacewatch	·	640 m	MPC · JPL
355247	2007 EH_{193}	—	March 14, 2007	Mount Lemmon	Mount Lemmon Survey	·	4.1 km	MPC · JPL
355248	2007 GB_{38}	—	April 14, 2007	Kitt Peak	Spacewatch	·	730 m	MPC · JPL
355249	2007 GE_{58}	—	April 15, 2007	Kitt Peak	Spacewatch	·	610 m	MPC · JPL
355250	2007 HX_{24}	—	April 18, 2007	Kitt Peak	Spacewatch	·	620 m	MPC · JPL
355251	2007 HV_{50}	—	April 20, 2007	Kitt Peak	Spacewatch	·	580 m	MPC · JPL
355252	2007 HU_{56}	—	April 22, 2007	Kitt Peak	Spacewatch	·	590 m	MPC · JPL
355253	2007 HL_{85}	—	April 24, 2007	Kitt Peak	Spacewatch	·	830 m	MPC · JPL
355254	2007 JB_{26}	—	May 9, 2007	Kitt Peak	Spacewatch	·	650 m	MPC · JPL
355255	2007 JE_{45}	—	May 10, 2007	Mount Lemmon	Mount Lemmon Survey	·	1.3 km	MPC · JPL
355256 Margarethekahn	2007 KN_{4}	Margarethekahn	May 20, 2007	Catalina	CSS	T_{j} (2.77) · AMO · CYB · +1km	1.6 km	MPC · JPL
355257	2007 KM_{8}	—	May 25, 2007	Mount Lemmon	Mount Lemmon Survey	·	940 m	MPC · JPL
355258	2007 LY_{4}	—	June 8, 2007	Kitt Peak	Spacewatch	·	510 m	MPC · JPL
355259	2007 NT_{2}	—	July 14, 2007	Dauban	Chante-Perdrix	·	1.0 km	MPC · JPL
355260	2007 OO_{3}	—	July 17, 2007	Dauban	Chante-Perdrix	·	1.0 km	MPC · JPL
355261	2007 OY_{4}	—	January 28, 2006	Kitt Peak	Spacewatch	V	820 m	MPC · JPL
355262	2007 OC_{7}	—	July 24, 2007	Reedy Creek	J. Broughton	·	980 m	MPC · JPL
355263	2007 PZ_{6}	—	August 4, 2007	Siding Spring	SSS	PHO	4.0 km	MPC · JPL
355264	2007 PE_{16}	—	August 8, 2007	Socorro	LINEAR	·	1.6 km	MPC · JPL
355265	2007 PH_{16}	—	August 8, 2007	Socorro	LINEAR	·	1.4 km	MPC · JPL
355266	2007 PM_{19}	—	August 9, 2007	Socorro	LINEAR	·	1.6 km	MPC · JPL
355267	2007 PK_{24}	—	August 12, 2007	Socorro	LINEAR	·	2.6 km	MPC · JPL
355268	2007 PK_{37}	—	August 13, 2007	Socorro	LINEAR	·	960 m	MPC · JPL
355269	2007 PH_{47}	—	August 10, 2007	Kitt Peak	Spacewatch	L4	13 km	MPC · JPL
355270	2007 PQ_{47}	—	August 10, 2007	Kitt Peak	Spacewatch	L4	12 km	MPC · JPL
355271	2007 PA_{48}	—	September 6, 2007	Siding Spring	SSS	V	900 m	MPC · JPL
355272	2007 QD_{9}	—	August 22, 2007	Socorro	LINEAR	·	1.7 km	MPC · JPL
355273	2007 QX_{16}	—	August 16, 2007	Socorro	LINEAR	(5)	1.1 km	MPC · JPL
355274	2007 QZ_{17}	—	August 24, 2007	Kitt Peak	Spacewatch	·	1.2 km	MPC · JPL
355275	2007 RP_{4}	—	September 3, 2007	Catalina	CSS	·	800 m	MPC · JPL
355276 Leclair	2007 RF_{17}	Leclair	September 12, 2007	Saint-Sulpice	B. Christophe	·	940 m	MPC · JPL
355277	2007 RN_{18}	—	September 12, 2007	Dauban	Chante-Perdrix	·	1.2 km	MPC · JPL
355278	2007 RS_{32}	—	September 5, 2007	Catalina	CSS	·	2.1 km	MPC · JPL
355279	2007 RM_{33}	—	September 5, 2007	Catalina	CSS	·	2.4 km	MPC · JPL
355280	2007 RQ_{41}	—	September 3, 2007	Catalina	CSS	·	1.5 km	MPC · JPL
355281	2007 RT_{42}	—	September 9, 2007	Kitt Peak	Spacewatch	·	1.4 km	MPC · JPL
355282	2007 RV_{70}	—	September 10, 2007	Kitt Peak	Spacewatch	·	1.5 km	MPC · JPL
355283	2007 RR_{80}	—	September 10, 2007	Mount Lemmon	Mount Lemmon Survey	·	880 m	MPC · JPL
355284	2007 RB_{85}	—	August 23, 2007	Kitt Peak	Spacewatch	EUN	1.3 km	MPC · JPL
355285	2007 RW_{92}	—	September 10, 2007	Mount Lemmon	Mount Lemmon Survey	·	1.5 km	MPC · JPL
355286	2007 RN_{99}	—	September 11, 2007	Kitt Peak	Spacewatch	L4	8.8 km	MPC · JPL
355287	2007 RS_{101}	—	August 10, 2007	Kitt Peak	Spacewatch	L4	7.4 km	MPC · JPL
355288	2007 RG_{141}	—	September 13, 2007	Socorro	LINEAR	NYS	1.3 km	MPC · JPL
355289	2007 RV_{145}	—	September 14, 2007	Socorro	LINEAR	·	1.7 km	MPC · JPL
355290	2007 RB_{154}	—	September 10, 2007	Kitt Peak	Spacewatch	·	1.0 km	MPC · JPL
355291	2007 RT_{155}	—	September 10, 2007	Mount Lemmon	Mount Lemmon Survey	L4	9.4 km	MPC · JPL
355292	2007 RA_{158}	—	September 28, 2003	Anderson Mesa	LONEOS	·	1.4 km	MPC · JPL
355293	2007 RH_{160}	—	September 12, 2007	Mount Lemmon	Mount Lemmon Survey	·	1.2 km	MPC · JPL
355294	2007 RS_{161}	—	September 13, 2007	Mount Lemmon	Mount Lemmon Survey	·	880 m	MPC · JPL
355295	2007 RV_{177}	—	September 10, 2007	Kitt Peak	Spacewatch	(5)	1.1 km	MPC · JPL
355296	2007 RV_{179}	—	September 10, 2007	Mount Lemmon	Mount Lemmon Survey	·	2.5 km	MPC · JPL
355297	2007 RM_{185}	—	September 13, 2007	Mount Lemmon	Mount Lemmon Survey	NYS	1 km	MPC · JPL
355298	2007 RV_{195}	—	September 12, 2007	Kitt Peak	Spacewatch	·	1.3 km	MPC · JPL
355299	2007 RH_{200}	—	September 13, 2007	Kitt Peak	Spacewatch	·	990 m	MPC · JPL
355300	2007 RK_{201}	—	September 13, 2007	Kitt Peak	Spacewatch	·	1.1 km	MPC · JPL

== 355301–355400 ==
back to top

Designation			Discovery			Properties		Ref
Permanent	Provisional	Named after	Date	Site	Discoverer(s)	Category	Diam.	Ref
355301	2007 RA_{239}	—	September 3, 2007	Catalina	CSS	V	760 m	MPC · JPL
355302	2007 RS_{241}	—	September 13, 2007	Socorro	LINEAR	·	4.0 km	MPC · JPL
355303	2007 RB_{245}	—	September 11, 2007	Kitt Peak	Spacewatch	·	1.6 km	MPC · JPL
355304	2007 RL_{251}	—	September 13, 2007	Kitt Peak	Spacewatch	·	1.1 km	MPC · JPL
355305	2007 RC_{273}	—	September 15, 2007	Kitt Peak	Spacewatch	·	1.2 km	MPC · JPL
355306	2007 RV_{277}	—	September 5, 2007	Catalina	CSS	JUN	1.1 km	MPC · JPL
355307	2007 RO_{280}	—	September 13, 2007	Catalina	CSS	·	1.4 km	MPC · JPL
355308	2007 RC_{293}	—	September 13, 2007	Mount Lemmon	Mount Lemmon Survey	PHO	1.0 km	MPC · JPL
355309	2007 RR_{297}	—	September 3, 2007	Catalina	CSS	·	1.2 km	MPC · JPL
355310	2007 RB_{309}	—	September 10, 2007	Mount Lemmon	Mount Lemmon Survey	L4	8.8 km	MPC · JPL
355311	2007 RY_{309}	—	September 3, 2007	Catalina	CSS	·	1.1 km	MPC · JPL
355312	2007 RZ_{310}	—	September 14, 2007	Catalina	CSS	·	1.9 km	MPC · JPL
355313	2007 RZ_{320}	—	September 11, 2007	Purple Mountain	PMO NEO Survey Program	·	800 m	MPC · JPL
355314	2007 RP_{321}	—	September 14, 2007	Mount Lemmon	Mount Lemmon Survey	V	770 m	MPC · JPL
355315	2007 RR_{322}	—	July 25, 2003	Palomar	NEAT	·	1.4 km	MPC · JPL
355316	2007 RZ_{323}	—	September 12, 2007	Mount Lemmon	Mount Lemmon Survey	·	1.4 km	MPC · JPL
355317	2007 SN_{12}	—	September 18, 2007	Anderson Mesa	LONEOS	·	1.3 km	MPC · JPL
355318	2007 SM_{14}	—	September 20, 2007	Catalina	CSS	·	2.4 km	MPC · JPL
355319	2007 SB_{16}	—	September 30, 2007	Kitt Peak	Spacewatch	·	1.2 km	MPC · JPL
355320	2007 SP_{16}	—	September 30, 2007	Kitt Peak	Spacewatch	·	1.0 km	MPC · JPL
355321	2007 SF_{22}	—	February 10, 2004	Palomar	NEAT	·	1.6 km	MPC · JPL
355322	2007 TF	—	October 1, 2007	Gaisberg	Gierlinger, R.	·	1.2 km	MPC · JPL
355323	2007 TR_{17}	—	October 7, 2007	Dauban	Chante-Perdrix	·	1.4 km	MPC · JPL
355324	2007 TT_{26}	—	October 4, 2007	Kitt Peak	Spacewatch	·	1.3 km	MPC · JPL
355325	2007 TH_{29}	—	October 4, 2007	Kitt Peak	Spacewatch	(5)	890 m	MPC · JPL
355326	2007 TN_{45}	—	October 7, 2007	Mount Lemmon	Mount Lemmon Survey	·	1.3 km	MPC · JPL
355327	2007 TL_{51}	—	October 4, 2007	Kitt Peak	Spacewatch	·	1.1 km	MPC · JPL
355328	2007 TE_{52}	—	October 4, 2007	Kitt Peak	Spacewatch	·	1.4 km	MPC · JPL
355329	2007 TY_{54}	—	October 4, 2007	Kitt Peak	Spacewatch	·	1.1 km	MPC · JPL
355330	2007 TZ_{54}	—	October 4, 2007	Kitt Peak	Spacewatch	MIS	2.2 km	MPC · JPL
355331	2007 TG_{56}	—	October 4, 2007	Kitt Peak	Spacewatch	·	1.3 km	MPC · JPL
355332	2007 TV_{57}	—	October 4, 2007	Kitt Peak	Spacewatch	·	1.4 km	MPC · JPL
355333	2007 TW_{64}	—	February 1, 2005	Kitt Peak	Spacewatch	·	1.1 km	MPC · JPL
355334	2007 TV_{67}	—	October 8, 2007	Catalina	CSS	·	1.3 km	MPC · JPL
355335	2007 TJ_{71}	—	October 14, 2007	Farra d'Isonzo	Farra d'Isonzo	·	1.7 km	MPC · JPL
355336	2007 TB_{77}	—	October 5, 2007	Kitt Peak	Spacewatch	·	1.2 km	MPC · JPL
355337	2007 TA_{84}	—	October 8, 2007	Kitt Peak	Spacewatch	·	1.2 km	MPC · JPL
355338	2007 TO_{84}	—	October 8, 2007	Catalina	CSS	·	1.4 km	MPC · JPL
355339	2007 TS_{90}	—	October 8, 2007	Mount Lemmon	Mount Lemmon Survey	·	1.4 km	MPC · JPL
355340	2007 TH_{110}	—	October 7, 2007	Mount Lemmon	Mount Lemmon Survey	MAS	800 m	MPC · JPL
355341	2007 TT_{110}	—	October 8, 2007	Catalina	CSS	·	1.5 km	MPC · JPL
355342	2007 TB_{112}	—	October 8, 2007	Catalina	CSS	·	1.5 km	MPC · JPL
355343	2007 TK_{118}	—	October 9, 2007	Mount Lemmon	Mount Lemmon Survey	·	1.2 km	MPC · JPL
355344	2007 TV_{121}	—	October 6, 2007	Kitt Peak	Spacewatch	EUN	1.2 km	MPC · JPL
355345	2007 TF_{130}	—	September 13, 2007	Mount Lemmon	Mount Lemmon Survey	·	1.7 km	MPC · JPL
355346	2007 TK_{136}	—	October 8, 2007	Mount Lemmon	Mount Lemmon Survey	·	1.1 km	MPC · JPL
355347	2007 TU_{139}	—	September 10, 2007	Mount Lemmon	Mount Lemmon Survey	EUN	1.2 km	MPC · JPL
355348	2007 TC_{153}	—	October 9, 2007	Anderson Mesa	LONEOS	·	1.4 km	MPC · JPL
355349	2007 TG_{157}	—	October 9, 2007	Socorro	LINEAR	·	1.7 km	MPC · JPL
355350	2007 TM_{159}	—	October 9, 2007	Socorro	LINEAR	MAR	1.5 km	MPC · JPL
355351	2007 TP_{168}	—	October 12, 2007	Socorro	LINEAR	·	1.8 km	MPC · JPL
355352	2007 TP_{172}	—	January 15, 2004	Kitt Peak	Spacewatch	AGN	1.2 km	MPC · JPL
355353	2007 TS_{184}	—	October 13, 2007	Cordell-Lorenz	D. T. Durig	·	1.6 km	MPC · JPL
355354	2007 TB_{198}	—	October 8, 2007	Kitt Peak	Spacewatch	·	1.1 km	MPC · JPL
355355	2007 TQ_{198}	—	October 8, 2007	Kitt Peak	Spacewatch	NYS	1.3 km	MPC · JPL
355356	2007 TB_{221}	—	August 10, 2007	Kitt Peak	Spacewatch	V	950 m	MPC · JPL
355357	2007 TN_{223}	—	October 10, 2007	Catalina	CSS	EUN	1.8 km	MPC · JPL
355358	2007 TS_{244}	—	October 8, 2007	Catalina	CSS	·	1.4 km	MPC · JPL
355359	2007 TH_{246}	—	October 9, 2007	Catalina	CSS	·	2.0 km	MPC · JPL
355360	2007 TB_{253}	—	October 8, 2007	Mount Lemmon	Mount Lemmon Survey	MAS	840 m	MPC · JPL
355361	2007 TR_{253}	—	October 8, 2007	Mount Lemmon	Mount Lemmon Survey	·	1.1 km	MPC · JPL
355362	2007 TF_{254}	—	October 8, 2007	Mount Lemmon	Mount Lemmon Survey	(5)	1.1 km	MPC · JPL
355363	2007 TP_{261}	—	October 10, 2007	Kitt Peak	Spacewatch	·	1.5 km	MPC · JPL
355364	2007 TM_{262}	—	September 15, 2007	Mount Lemmon	Mount Lemmon Survey	·	1.2 km	MPC · JPL
355365	2007 TF_{266}	—	October 12, 2007	Kitt Peak	Spacewatch	·	1.2 km	MPC · JPL
355366	2007 TO_{272}	—	October 9, 2007	Kitt Peak	Spacewatch	·	1.9 km	MPC · JPL
355367	2007 TA_{276}	—	October 11, 2007	Mount Lemmon	Mount Lemmon Survey	·	1.2 km	MPC · JPL
355368	2007 TU_{287}	—	August 21, 2007	Siding Spring	SSS	·	2.2 km	MPC · JPL
355369	2007 TP_{310}	—	October 11, 2007	Mount Lemmon	Mount Lemmon Survey	·	1.2 km	MPC · JPL
355370	2007 TO_{314}	—	October 11, 2007	Mount Lemmon	Mount Lemmon Survey	·	1.6 km	MPC · JPL
355371	2007 TE_{330}	—	October 11, 2007	Kitt Peak	Spacewatch	EUN	1.3 km	MPC · JPL
355372	2007 TD_{331}	—	October 11, 2007	Kitt Peak	Spacewatch	·	1.5 km	MPC · JPL
355373	2007 TE_{332}	—	September 12, 2007	Mount Lemmon	Mount Lemmon Survey	·	1.7 km	MPC · JPL
355374	2007 TK_{332}	—	October 11, 2007	Kitt Peak	Spacewatch	(5)	1.2 km	MPC · JPL
355375	2007 TL_{350}	—	October 14, 2007	Mount Lemmon	Mount Lemmon Survey	L4	10 km	MPC · JPL
355376	2007 TW_{353}	—	October 9, 2007	Purple Mountain	PMO NEO Survey Program	·	1.5 km	MPC · JPL
355377	2007 TW_{355}	—	September 12, 2007	Catalina	CSS	JUN	1.4 km	MPC · JPL
355378	2007 TJ_{366}	—	October 9, 2007	Kitt Peak	Spacewatch	·	1.2 km	MPC · JPL
355379	2007 TS_{376}	—	October 10, 2007	Catalina	CSS	·	1.8 km	MPC · JPL
355380	2007 TT_{394}	—	October 15, 2007	Kitt Peak	Spacewatch	·	1.2 km	MPC · JPL
355381	2007 TQ_{409}	—	October 15, 2007	Mount Lemmon	Mount Lemmon Survey	·	2.0 km	MPC · JPL
355382	2007 TO_{411}	—	October 13, 2007	Anderson Mesa	LONEOS	·	1.9 km	MPC · JPL
355383	2007 TM_{412}	—	September 12, 2007	Catalina	CSS	BRG	1.5 km	MPC · JPL
355384	2007 TP_{422}	—	October 9, 2007	Kitt Peak	Spacewatch	·	2.5 km	MPC · JPL
355385	2007 TQ_{423}	—	October 6, 2007	Kitt Peak	Spacewatch	·	1.7 km	MPC · JPL
355386	2007 TB_{426}	—	October 9, 2007	Kitt Peak	Spacewatch	(5)	1.1 km	MPC · JPL
355387	2007 TG_{437}	—	October 4, 2007	Mount Lemmon	Mount Lemmon Survey	L4	9.4 km	MPC · JPL
355388	2007 TU_{437}	—	October 8, 2007	Catalina	CSS	·	1.3 km	MPC · JPL
355389	2007 TZ_{439}	—	February 9, 2005	Mount Lemmon	Mount Lemmon Survey	·	980 m	MPC · JPL
355390	2007 TL_{441}	—	October 12, 2007	Mount Lemmon	Mount Lemmon Survey	·	1.7 km	MPC · JPL
355391	2007 TA_{442}	—	October 10, 2007	Catalina	CSS	EUN	1.1 km	MPC · JPL
355392	2007 TR_{442}	—	October 9, 2007	Catalina	CSS	·	1.6 km	MPC · JPL
355393	2007 TC_{451}	—	October 14, 2007	Mount Lemmon	Mount Lemmon Survey	·	1.7 km	MPC · JPL
355394	2007 UX	—	October 16, 2007	7300	W. K. Y. Yeung	·	2.1 km	MPC · JPL
355395	2007 UE_{7}	—	September 13, 2007	Catalina	CSS	·	2.0 km	MPC · JPL
355396	2007 UM_{9}	—	October 17, 2007	Anderson Mesa	LONEOS	·	1.8 km	MPC · JPL
355397	2007 UK_{14}	—	October 16, 2007	Catalina	CSS	·	1.6 km	MPC · JPL
355398	2007 UO_{17}	—	October 18, 2007	Mount Lemmon	Mount Lemmon Survey	NYS	1.3 km	MPC · JPL
355399	2007 UH_{34}	—	October 17, 2007	Catalina	CSS	·	1.8 km	MPC · JPL
355400	2007 US_{43}	—	October 18, 2007	Kitt Peak	Spacewatch	·	1.2 km	MPC · JPL

== 355401–355500 ==
back to top

Designation			Discovery			Properties		Ref
Permanent	Provisional	Named after	Date	Site	Discoverer(s)	Category	Diam.	Ref
355401	2007 UX_{46}	—	October 20, 2007	Catalina	CSS	·	1.7 km	MPC · JPL
355402	2007 UP_{52}	—	October 24, 2007	Mount Lemmon	Mount Lemmon Survey	·	1.6 km	MPC · JPL
355403	2007 UJ_{55}	—	October 30, 2007	Kitt Peak	Spacewatch	·	1.6 km	MPC · JPL
355404	2007 UJ_{61}	—	October 30, 2007	Mount Lemmon	Mount Lemmon Survey	·	1.5 km	MPC · JPL
355405	2007 UC_{67}	—	October 30, 2007	Kitt Peak	Spacewatch	·	1.1 km	MPC · JPL
355406	2007 UU_{76}	—	October 31, 2007	Mount Lemmon	Mount Lemmon Survey	·	1.2 km	MPC · JPL
355407	2007 UE_{78}	—	October 10, 2007	Kitt Peak	Spacewatch	·	1.2 km	MPC · JPL
355408	2007 UK_{78}	—	October 30, 2007	Catalina	CSS	(5)	1.2 km	MPC · JPL
355409	2007 UG_{87}	—	October 30, 2007	Kitt Peak	Spacewatch	·	2.3 km	MPC · JPL
355410	2007 UX_{87}	—	October 30, 2007	Kitt Peak	Spacewatch	·	1.2 km	MPC · JPL
355411	2007 UB_{94}	—	October 10, 2007	Kitt Peak	Spacewatch	·	1.6 km	MPC · JPL
355412	2007 UR_{105}	—	October 30, 2007	Kitt Peak	Spacewatch	·	1.4 km	MPC · JPL
355413	2007 UE_{108}	—	October 11, 2007	Kitt Peak	Spacewatch	·	1.4 km	MPC · JPL
355414	2007 UW_{114}	—	October 31, 2007	Kitt Peak	Spacewatch	·	1.7 km	MPC · JPL
355415	2007 UC_{116}	—	October 31, 2007	Kitt Peak	Spacewatch	·	1.7 km	MPC · JPL
355416	2007 UE_{116}	—	October 20, 2007	Mount Lemmon	Mount Lemmon Survey	·	1.5 km	MPC · JPL
355417	2007 UB_{122}	—	October 30, 2007	Kitt Peak	Spacewatch	·	1.3 km	MPC · JPL
355418	2007 UV_{126}	—	October 20, 2007	Catalina	CSS	·	1.5 km	MPC · JPL
355419	2007 UF_{127}	—	October 30, 2007	Kitt Peak	Spacewatch	·	1.2 km	MPC · JPL
355420	2007 UJ_{127}	—	October 30, 2007	Kitt Peak	Spacewatch	·	2.1 km	MPC · JPL
355421	2007 UC_{128}	—	October 17, 2007	Mount Lemmon	Mount Lemmon Survey	MIS	2.8 km	MPC · JPL
355422	2007 UO_{138}	—	October 20, 2007	Mount Lemmon	Mount Lemmon Survey	·	1.7 km	MPC · JPL
355423	2007 VH_{2}	—	November 2, 2007	Socorro	LINEAR	(5)	1.5 km	MPC · JPL
355424	2007 VR_{2}	—	November 3, 2007	Lumezzane	Pizzetti, G., Soffiantini, A.	WIT	1.1 km	MPC · JPL
355425	2007 VM_{9}	—	November 2, 2007	Catalina	CSS	·	2.0 km	MPC · JPL
355426	2007 VP_{9}	—	November 3, 2007	Kitt Peak	Spacewatch	·	1.9 km	MPC · JPL
355427	2007 VQ_{22}	—	November 2, 2007	Mount Lemmon	Mount Lemmon Survey	NYS	1.3 km	MPC · JPL
355428	2007 VQ_{25}	—	November 1, 2007	Kitt Peak	Spacewatch	MAR	1.4 km	MPC · JPL
355429	2007 VC_{37}	—	November 2, 2007	Catalina	CSS	ADE	2.2 km	MPC · JPL
355430	2007 VY_{40}	—	December 16, 1999	Kitt Peak	Spacewatch	·	1.5 km	MPC · JPL
355431	2007 VS_{42}	—	November 3, 2007	Mount Lemmon	Mount Lemmon Survey	615	1.6 km	MPC · JPL
355432	2007 VQ_{45}	—	November 1, 2007	Kitt Peak	Spacewatch	·	1.1 km	MPC · JPL
355433	2007 VY_{56}	—	October 20, 2007	Mount Lemmon	Mount Lemmon Survey	·	1.9 km	MPC · JPL
355434	2007 VR_{57}	—	November 1, 2007	Kitt Peak	Spacewatch	·	2.3 km	MPC · JPL
355435	2007 VD_{60}	—	November 2, 2007	Catalina	CSS	·	2.2 km	MPC · JPL
355436	2007 VR_{62}	—	November 1, 2007	Kitt Peak	Spacewatch	·	1.9 km	MPC · JPL
355437	2007 VA_{63}	—	November 1, 2007	Kitt Peak	Spacewatch	·	1.5 km	MPC · JPL
355438	2007 VK_{65}	—	November 1, 2007	Kitt Peak	Spacewatch	·	1.6 km	MPC · JPL
355439	2007 VR_{66}	—	November 2, 2007	Kitt Peak	Spacewatch	·	1.4 km	MPC · JPL
355440	2007 VK_{67}	—	November 3, 2007	Kitt Peak	Spacewatch	NYS	1.1 km	MPC · JPL
355441	2007 VV_{72}	—	November 1, 2007	Kitt Peak	Spacewatch	·	1.8 km	MPC · JPL
355442	2007 VM_{80}	—	November 3, 2007	Kitt Peak	Spacewatch	·	1.4 km	MPC · JPL
355443	2007 VS_{86}	—	November 2, 2007	Socorro	LINEAR	EUN	1.6 km	MPC · JPL
355444	2007 VU_{98}	—	November 2, 2007	Kitt Peak	Spacewatch	ADE	2.1 km	MPC · JPL
355445	2007 VX_{110}	—	September 14, 2007	Mount Lemmon	Mount Lemmon Survey	·	1.1 km	MPC · JPL
355446	2007 VZ_{127}	—	November 1, 2007	Mount Lemmon	Mount Lemmon Survey	·	1.1 km	MPC · JPL
355447	2007 VH_{133}	—	October 8, 2007	Mount Lemmon	Mount Lemmon Survey	·	1.2 km	MPC · JPL
355448	2007 VQ_{135}	—	November 3, 2007	Mount Lemmon	Mount Lemmon Survey	·	2.0 km	MPC · JPL
355449	2007 VH_{148}	—	November 4, 2007	Kitt Peak	Spacewatch	MRX	1.3 km	MPC · JPL
355450	2007 VO_{153}	—	November 4, 2007	Kitt Peak	Spacewatch	·	1.2 km	MPC · JPL
355451	2007 VT_{154}	—	November 5, 2007	Kitt Peak	Spacewatch	·	1.4 km	MPC · JPL
355452	2007 VM_{191}	—	November 4, 2007	Catalina	CSS	(18466)	2.4 km	MPC · JPL
355453	2007 VL_{207}	—	November 11, 2007	Catalina	CSS	·	2.3 km	MPC · JPL
355454	2007 VJ_{209}	—	November 7, 2007	Kitt Peak	Spacewatch	(5)	920 m	MPC · JPL
355455	2007 VC_{212}	—	November 9, 2007	Kitt Peak	Spacewatch	·	1.1 km	MPC · JPL
355456	2007 VD_{221}	—	November 12, 2007	Mount Lemmon	Mount Lemmon Survey	KON	2.6 km	MPC · JPL
355457	2007 VB_{228}	—	November 2, 2007	Catalina	CSS	·	2.0 km	MPC · JPL
355458	2007 VG_{228}	—	October 12, 2007	Mount Lemmon	Mount Lemmon Survey	·	1.4 km	MPC · JPL
355459	2007 VU_{230}	—	November 7, 2007	Kitt Peak	Spacewatch	·	1.4 km	MPC · JPL
355460	2007 VD_{234}	—	November 9, 2007	Kitt Peak	Spacewatch	·	1.5 km	MPC · JPL
355461	2007 VH_{235}	—	November 9, 2007	Kitt Peak	Spacewatch	·	1.3 km	MPC · JPL
355462	2007 VB_{239}	—	November 13, 2007	Kitt Peak	Spacewatch	·	2.5 km	MPC · JPL
355463	2007 VB_{255}	—	November 11, 2007	Mount Lemmon	Mount Lemmon Survey	·	2.2 km	MPC · JPL
355464	2007 VK_{265}	—	November 2, 2007	Kitt Peak	Spacewatch	·	1.5 km	MPC · JPL
355465	2007 VA_{274}	—	September 20, 2007	Catalina	CSS	JUN	1.3 km	MPC · JPL
355466	2007 VS_{283}	—	November 14, 2007	Kitt Peak	Spacewatch	·	1.5 km	MPC · JPL
355467	2007 VZ_{297}	—	October 19, 2007	Catalina	CSS	·	1.8 km	MPC · JPL
355468	2007 VE_{298}	—	October 12, 2007	Mount Lemmon	Mount Lemmon Survey	·	1.6 km	MPC · JPL
355469	2007 VY_{301}	—	November 2, 2007	Catalina	CSS	·	600 m	MPC · JPL
355470	2007 VA_{303}	—	November 3, 2007	Catalina	CSS	·	2.0 km	MPC · JPL
355471	2007 VZ_{305}	—	November 7, 2007	Mount Lemmon	Mount Lemmon Survey	KOR	1.6 km	MPC · JPL
355472	2007 VF_{307}	—	November 2, 2007	Kitt Peak	Spacewatch	(5)	1.4 km	MPC · JPL
355473	2007 VR_{309}	—	November 2, 2007	Kitt Peak	Spacewatch	·	1.7 km	MPC · JPL
355474	2007 VM_{311}	—	November 9, 2007	Kitt Peak	Spacewatch	·	1.3 km	MPC · JPL
355475	2007 VU_{312}	—	November 3, 2007	Mount Lemmon	Mount Lemmon Survey	GEF	1.3 km	MPC · JPL
355476	2007 VG_{314}	—	October 2, 2003	Kitt Peak	Spacewatch	·	1.5 km	MPC · JPL
355477	2007 VU_{318}	—	September 10, 2007	Mount Lemmon	Mount Lemmon Survey	(5)	1.2 km	MPC · JPL
355478	2007 VZ_{320}	—	November 29, 2003	Kitt Peak	Spacewatch	·	1.8 km	MPC · JPL
355479	2007 VG_{332}	—	November 7, 2007	Kitt Peak	Spacewatch	·	2.2 km	MPC · JPL
355480	2007 VJ_{332}	—	November 7, 2007	Mount Lemmon	Mount Lemmon Survey	EOS	2.3 km	MPC · JPL
355481	2007 VD_{335}	—	November 14, 2007	Kitt Peak	Spacewatch	·	2.0 km	MPC · JPL
355482	2007 WS_{5}	—	November 17, 2007	Socorro	LINEAR	·	2.2 km	MPC · JPL
355483	2007 WB_{27}	—	August 13, 2002	Palomar	NEAT	·	1.8 km	MPC · JPL
355484	2007 WN_{27}	—	November 18, 2007	Mount Lemmon	Mount Lemmon Survey	·	2.2 km	MPC · JPL
355485	2007 WC_{28}	—	November 7, 2007	Kitt Peak	Spacewatch	·	1.7 km	MPC · JPL
355486	2007 WK_{34}	—	November 4, 2007	Kitt Peak	Spacewatch	·	1.7 km	MPC · JPL
355487	2007 WG_{40}	—	November 18, 2007	Catalina	CSS	·	2.4 km	MPC · JPL
355488	2007 WZ_{58}	—	November 21, 2007	Mount Lemmon	Mount Lemmon Survey	·	2.8 km	MPC · JPL
355489	2007 WK_{61}	—	November 17, 2007	Socorro	LINEAR	·	2.0 km	MPC · JPL
355490	2007 WV_{62}	—	November 19, 2007	Kitt Peak	Spacewatch	·	1.4 km	MPC · JPL
355491	2007 XV_{2}	—	December 3, 2007	Kitt Peak	Spacewatch	AGN	1.3 km	MPC · JPL
355492	2007 XP_{4}	—	November 12, 2007	Socorro	LINEAR	·	2.9 km	MPC · JPL
355493	2007 XD_{15}	—	December 5, 2007	Bisei SG Center	BATTeRS	·	2.2 km	MPC · JPL
355494	2007 XN_{19}	—	November 20, 2007	Kitt Peak	Spacewatch	·	2.2 km	MPC · JPL
355495	2007 XP_{20}	—	December 12, 2007	La Sagra	OAM	·	1.5 km	MPC · JPL
355496	2007 XB_{30}	—	January 27, 2004	Anderson Mesa	LONEOS	·	2.6 km	MPC · JPL
355497	2007 XQ_{31}	—	December 15, 2007	Kanab	Sheridan, E.	·	1.8 km	MPC · JPL
355498	2007 XW_{34}	—	December 13, 2007	Socorro	LINEAR	·	2.4 km	MPC · JPL
355499	2007 XL_{40}	—	November 12, 2007	Mount Lemmon	Mount Lemmon Survey	(13314)	2.5 km	MPC · JPL
355500	2007 XD_{59}	—	December 15, 2007	Socorro	LINEAR	MAR	1.6 km	MPC · JPL

== 355501–355600 ==
back to top

Designation			Discovery			Properties		Ref
Permanent	Provisional	Named after	Date	Site	Discoverer(s)	Category	Diam.	Ref
355501	2007 YB_{3}	—	December 18, 2007	Bergisch Gladbach	W. Bickel	HOF	3.0 km	MPC · JPL
355502	2007 YK_{10}	—	December 16, 2007	Mount Lemmon	Mount Lemmon Survey	·	2.1 km	MPC · JPL
355503	2007 YP_{10}	—	December 16, 2007	Mount Lemmon	Mount Lemmon Survey	·	2.6 km	MPC · JPL
355504	2007 YS_{27}	—	December 18, 2007	Kitt Peak	Spacewatch	·	3.1 km	MPC · JPL
355505	2007 YL_{45}	—	December 30, 2007	Mount Lemmon	Mount Lemmon Survey	·	2.4 km	MPC · JPL
355506	2007 YN_{46}	—	December 30, 2007	Mount Lemmon	Mount Lemmon Survey	·	3.6 km	MPC · JPL
355507	2007 YX_{49}	—	December 28, 2007	Kitt Peak	Spacewatch	·	2.6 km	MPC · JPL
355508	2007 YU_{50}	—	December 28, 2007	Kitt Peak	Spacewatch	AGN	1.3 km	MPC · JPL
355509	2007 YB_{52}	—	December 30, 2007	Kitt Peak	Spacewatch	·	1.9 km	MPC · JPL
355510	2007 YO_{57}	—	December 28, 2007	Kitt Peak	Spacewatch	·	1.9 km	MPC · JPL
355511	2007 YR_{62}	—	December 30, 2007	Mount Lemmon	Mount Lemmon Survey	·	1.6 km	MPC · JPL
355512	2007 YP_{63}	—	December 31, 2007	Kitt Peak	Spacewatch	·	1.7 km	MPC · JPL
355513	2007 YX_{63}	—	December 31, 2007	Mount Lemmon	Mount Lemmon Survey	NAE	2.2 km	MPC · JPL
355514	2007 YO_{65}	—	December 30, 2007	Mount Lemmon	Mount Lemmon Survey	·	2.1 km	MPC · JPL
355515	2007 YU_{68}	—	December 16, 2007	Mount Lemmon	Mount Lemmon Survey	WIT	1.2 km	MPC · JPL
355516	2008 AV_{21}	—	January 10, 2008	Mount Lemmon	Mount Lemmon Survey	·	1.6 km	MPC · JPL
355517	2008 AC_{26}	—	January 10, 2008	Mount Lemmon	Mount Lemmon Survey	·	1.9 km	MPC · JPL
355518	2008 AR_{27}	—	January 10, 2008	Mount Lemmon	Mount Lemmon Survey	·	3.2 km	MPC · JPL
355519	2008 AE_{38}	—	January 10, 2008	Mount Lemmon	Mount Lemmon Survey	·	2.0 km	MPC · JPL
355520	2008 AO_{46}	—	November 13, 2007	Kitt Peak	Spacewatch	·	1.4 km	MPC · JPL
355521	2008 AV_{47}	—	January 11, 2008	Kitt Peak	Spacewatch	·	2.5 km	MPC · JPL
355522	2008 AX_{47}	—	November 5, 2007	Mount Lemmon	Mount Lemmon Survey	·	1.9 km	MPC · JPL
355523	2008 AZ_{53}	—	December 31, 2007	Mount Lemmon	Mount Lemmon Survey	·	1.5 km	MPC · JPL
355524	2008 AW_{59}	—	January 11, 2008	Kitt Peak	Spacewatch	KOR	1.5 km	MPC · JPL
355525	2008 AK_{64}	—	January 11, 2008	Mount Lemmon	Mount Lemmon Survey	·	2.7 km	MPC · JPL
355526	2008 AK_{75}	—	January 11, 2008	Mount Lemmon	Mount Lemmon Survey	AGN	1.1 km	MPC · JPL
355527	2008 AE_{80}	—	January 12, 2008	Kitt Peak	Spacewatch	BRA	3.0 km	MPC · JPL
355528	2008 AN_{84}	—	January 15, 2008	Kitt Peak	Spacewatch	·	2.1 km	MPC · JPL
355529	2008 AZ_{84}	—	January 13, 2008	Kitt Peak	Spacewatch	KOR	1.3 km	MPC · JPL
355530	2008 AX_{85}	—	January 13, 2008	Kitt Peak	Spacewatch	·	2.4 km	MPC · JPL
355531	2008 AM_{93}	—	December 31, 2007	Kitt Peak	Spacewatch	·	2.0 km	MPC · JPL
355532	2008 AN_{96}	—	January 14, 2008	Kitt Peak	Spacewatch	·	2.0 km	MPC · JPL
355533	2008 AO_{100}	—	January 14, 2008	Kitt Peak	Spacewatch	·	2.1 km	MPC · JPL
355534	2008 AG_{106}	—	January 15, 2008	Mount Lemmon	Mount Lemmon Survey	·	2.0 km	MPC · JPL
355535	2008 AS_{107}	—	November 8, 2007	Mount Lemmon	Mount Lemmon Survey	·	2.5 km	MPC · JPL
355536	2008 AS_{108}	—	June 17, 2005	Mount Lemmon	Mount Lemmon Survey	·	2.0 km	MPC · JPL
355537	2008 AW_{116}	—	January 15, 2008	Mount Lemmon	Mount Lemmon Survey	·	2.2 km	MPC · JPL
355538	2008 AY_{135}	—	January 11, 2008	Catalina	CSS	·	3.0 km	MPC · JPL
355539	2008 AM_{136}	—	January 12, 2008	Mount Lemmon	Mount Lemmon Survey	·	2.9 km	MPC · JPL
355540	2008 AC_{137}	—	January 15, 2008	Socorro	LINEAR	·	2.4 km	MPC · JPL
355541	2008 BS_{4}	—	January 16, 2008	Kitt Peak	Spacewatch	·	2.1 km	MPC · JPL
355542	2008 BX_{10}	—	January 18, 2008	Kitt Peak	Spacewatch	DOR	2.5 km	MPC · JPL
355543	2008 BP_{13}	—	January 19, 2008	Mount Lemmon	Mount Lemmon Survey	·	1.9 km	MPC · JPL
355544	2008 BK_{19}	—	November 11, 2007	Mount Lemmon	Mount Lemmon Survey	AGN	1.2 km	MPC · JPL
355545	2008 BK_{21}	—	January 30, 2008	Mount Lemmon	Mount Lemmon Survey	·	1.8 km	MPC · JPL
355546	2008 BO_{21}	—	January 30, 2008	Mount Lemmon	Mount Lemmon Survey	·	1.9 km	MPC · JPL
355547	2008 BD_{22}	—	January 31, 2008	Mount Lemmon	Mount Lemmon Survey	H	560 m	MPC · JPL
355548	2008 BS_{24}	—	January 31, 2008	Costitx	OAM	H	430 m	MPC · JPL
355549	2008 BZ_{48}	—	January 30, 2008	Mount Lemmon	Mount Lemmon Survey	·	1.9 km	MPC · JPL
355550	2008 BQ_{53}	—	January 30, 2008	Mount Lemmon	Mount Lemmon Survey	·	1.7 km	MPC · JPL
355551	2008 BW_{53}	—	January 30, 2008	Mount Lemmon	Mount Lemmon Survey	·	3.7 km	MPC · JPL
355552	2008 BC_{54}	—	January 31, 2008	Mount Lemmon	Mount Lemmon Survey	EUP	5.6 km	MPC · JPL
355553	2008 CQ_{2}	—	February 1, 2008	Kitt Peak	Spacewatch	·	2.9 km	MPC · JPL
355554	2008 CH_{10}	—	February 2, 2008	Kitt Peak	Spacewatch	·	5.2 km	MPC · JPL
355555	2008 CY_{10}	—	February 3, 2008	Kitt Peak	Spacewatch	EOS	2.1 km	MPC · JPL
355556	2008 CX_{11}	—	February 3, 2008	Kitt Peak	Spacewatch	·	3.4 km	MPC · JPL
355557	2008 CH_{16}	—	February 3, 2008	Kitt Peak	Spacewatch	NAE	5.7 km	MPC · JPL
355558	2008 CB_{18}	—	February 3, 2008	Kitt Peak	Spacewatch	EOS	2.1 km	MPC · JPL
355559	2008 CN_{20}	—	February 6, 2008	Junk Bond	D. Healy	·	1.6 km	MPC · JPL
355560	2008 CU_{22}	—	January 13, 2008	Kitt Peak	Spacewatch	·	1.8 km	MPC · JPL
355561	2008 CX_{27}	—	February 2, 2008	Kitt Peak	Spacewatch	BRA	1.5 km	MPC · JPL
355562	2008 CA_{33}	—	February 2, 2008	Kitt Peak	Spacewatch	·	2.4 km	MPC · JPL
355563	2008 CE_{37}	—	December 14, 2007	Mount Lemmon	Mount Lemmon Survey	·	3.0 km	MPC · JPL
355564	2008 CN_{41}	—	February 2, 2008	Kitt Peak	Spacewatch	·	5.5 km	MPC · JPL
355565	2008 CL_{46}	—	February 7, 2002	Kitt Peak	Spacewatch	VER	3.0 km	MPC · JPL
355566	2008 CM_{46}	—	February 2, 2008	Kitt Peak	Spacewatch	·	2.8 km	MPC · JPL
355567	2008 CM_{59}	—	February 7, 2008	Mount Lemmon	Mount Lemmon Survey	EOS	1.6 km	MPC · JPL
355568	2008 CW_{61}	—	November 25, 2006	Kitt Peak	Spacewatch	·	2.5 km	MPC · JPL
355569	2008 CY_{62}	—	February 8, 2008	Mount Lemmon	Mount Lemmon Survey	·	2.3 km	MPC · JPL
355570	2008 CW_{67}	—	February 8, 2008	Mount Lemmon	Mount Lemmon Survey	·	3.1 km	MPC · JPL
355571	2008 CA_{76}	—	February 3, 2008	Kitt Peak	Spacewatch	·	3.7 km	MPC · JPL
355572	2008 CQ_{76}	—	February 6, 2008	Catalina	CSS	MRX	1.5 km	MPC · JPL
355573	2008 CG_{82}	—	September 12, 2005	Kitt Peak	Spacewatch	·	3.0 km	MPC · JPL
355574	2008 CR_{83}	—	February 7, 2008	Kitt Peak	Spacewatch	THB	3.7 km	MPC · JPL
355575	2008 CT_{84}	—	February 2, 2008	Kitt Peak	Spacewatch	·	1.6 km	MPC · JPL
355576	2008 CQ_{85}	—	February 7, 2008	Mount Lemmon	Mount Lemmon Survey	·	2.5 km	MPC · JPL
355577	2008 CW_{93}	—	February 8, 2008	Mount Lemmon	Mount Lemmon Survey	·	3.0 km	MPC · JPL
355578	2008 CN_{98}	—	February 9, 2008	Kitt Peak	Spacewatch	KOR	1.3 km	MPC · JPL
355579	2008 CV_{98}	—	February 9, 2008	Kitt Peak	Spacewatch	KOR	1.4 km	MPC · JPL
355580	2008 CY_{99}	—	February 9, 2008	Kitt Peak	Spacewatch	EOS	2.0 km	MPC · JPL
355581	2008 CK_{103}	—	February 9, 2008	Kitt Peak	Spacewatch	·	6.8 km	MPC · JPL
355582	2008 CC_{111}	—	February 10, 2008	Kitt Peak	Spacewatch	·	2.7 km	MPC · JPL
355583	2008 CL_{113}	—	February 10, 2008	Kitt Peak	Spacewatch	·	2.0 km	MPC · JPL
355584	2008 CV_{115}	—	April 1, 2003	Apache Point	SDSS	EOS	2.1 km	MPC · JPL
355585	2008 CE_{125}	—	February 8, 2008	Kitt Peak	Spacewatch	GEF	1.5 km	MPC · JPL
355586	2008 CR_{127}	—	August 30, 2005	Kitt Peak	Spacewatch	EOS	2.1 km	MPC · JPL
355587	2008 CE_{128}	—	October 5, 2005	Kitt Peak	Spacewatch	·	3.1 km	MPC · JPL
355588	2008 CL_{133}	—	February 8, 2008	Kitt Peak	Spacewatch	·	3.3 km	MPC · JPL
355589	2008 CY_{135}	—	February 8, 2008	Kitt Peak	Spacewatch	·	3.3 km	MPC · JPL
355590	2008 CK_{140}	—	January 30, 2008	Kitt Peak	Spacewatch	EOS	2.2 km	MPC · JPL
355591	2008 CV_{142}	—	February 8, 2008	Kitt Peak	Spacewatch	·	2.8 km	MPC · JPL
355592	2008 CH_{147}	—	February 9, 2008	Kitt Peak	Spacewatch	EOS	2.3 km	MPC · JPL
355593	2008 CU_{153}	—	February 9, 2008	Kitt Peak	Spacewatch	·	3.0 km	MPC · JPL
355594	2008 CF_{168}	—	September 11, 2005	Kitt Peak	Spacewatch	·	2.8 km	MPC · JPL
355595	2008 CO_{179}	—	February 6, 2008	Purple Mountain	PMO NEO Survey Program	·	4.3 km	MPC · JPL
355596	2008 CF_{182}	—	February 11, 2008	Mount Lemmon	Mount Lemmon Survey	·	2.3 km	MPC · JPL
355597	2008 CN_{185}	—	February 6, 2008	Catalina	CSS	·	2.7 km	MPC · JPL
355598	2008 CO_{195}	—	February 2, 2008	Kitt Peak	Spacewatch	·	2.0 km	MPC · JPL
355599	2008 CF_{196}	—	February 12, 2008	Mount Lemmon	Mount Lemmon Survey	LIX	4.0 km	MPC · JPL
355600	2008 CF_{199}	—	February 13, 2008	Kitt Peak	Spacewatch	·	2.0 km	MPC · JPL

== 355601–355700 ==
back to top

Designation			Discovery			Properties		Ref
Permanent	Provisional	Named after	Date	Site	Discoverer(s)	Category	Diam.	Ref
355601	2008 CW_{202}	—	February 8, 2008	Kitt Peak	Spacewatch	·	2.6 km	MPC · JPL
355602	2008 CL_{213}	—	February 9, 2008	Mount Lemmon	Mount Lemmon Survey	·	3.3 km	MPC · JPL
355603	2008 CH_{215}	—	February 13, 2008	Socorro	LINEAR	·	5.0 km	MPC · JPL
355604	2008 DO_{9}	—	February 25, 2008	Kitt Peak	Spacewatch	·	4.4 km	MPC · JPL
355605	2008 DG_{13}	—	February 26, 2008	Kitt Peak	Spacewatch	·	2.3 km	MPC · JPL
355606	2008 DU_{13}	—	January 22, 2002	Kitt Peak	Spacewatch	·	3.5 km	MPC · JPL
355607	2008 DV_{24}	—	November 19, 2007	Kitt Peak	Spacewatch	·	2.3 km	MPC · JPL
355608	2008 DX_{25}	—	February 29, 2008	Purple Mountain	PMO NEO Survey Program	H	580 m	MPC · JPL
355609	2008 DC_{27}	—	February 29, 2008	Catalina	CSS	·	4.2 km	MPC · JPL
355610	2008 DF_{27}	—	February 27, 2008	Mount Lemmon	Mount Lemmon Survey	·	4.7 km	MPC · JPL
355611	2008 DT_{32}	—	February 27, 2008	Kitt Peak	Spacewatch	·	3.0 km	MPC · JPL
355612	2008 DD_{33}	—	February 27, 2008	Kitt Peak	Spacewatch	EOS	2.1 km	MPC · JPL
355613	2008 DO_{33}	—	November 20, 2007	Mount Lemmon	Mount Lemmon Survey	·	2.5 km	MPC · JPL
355614	2008 DN_{34}	—	February 27, 2008	Catalina	CSS	T_{j} (2.97)	3.2 km	MPC · JPL
355615	2008 DW_{35}	—	February 27, 2008	Mount Lemmon	Mount Lemmon Survey	THM	2.3 km	MPC · JPL
355616	2008 DT_{36}	—	February 27, 2008	Mount Lemmon	Mount Lemmon Survey	·	2.2 km	MPC · JPL
355617	2008 DH_{37}	—	February 27, 2008	Mount Lemmon	Mount Lemmon Survey	THM	2.3 km	MPC · JPL
355618	2008 DZ_{38}	—	February 27, 2008	Mount Lemmon	Mount Lemmon Survey	·	2.0 km	MPC · JPL
355619	2008 DV_{45}	—	February 18, 2008	Mount Lemmon	Mount Lemmon Survey	·	4.2 km	MPC · JPL
355620	2008 DA_{48}	—	February 28, 2008	Mount Lemmon	Mount Lemmon Survey	·	1.8 km	MPC · JPL
355621	2008 DS_{54}	—	February 28, 2008	Catalina	CSS	BRA	2.0 km	MPC · JPL
355622	2008 DW_{59}	—	February 27, 2008	Kitt Peak	Spacewatch	·	4.4 km	MPC · JPL
355623	2008 DS_{66}	—	February 29, 2008	Catalina	CSS	·	2.7 km	MPC · JPL
355624	2008 DW_{67}	—	February 29, 2008	Kitt Peak	Spacewatch	·	1.8 km	MPC · JPL
355625	2008 DG_{68}	—	December 1, 2006	Mount Lemmon	Mount Lemmon Survey	·	2.3 km	MPC · JPL
355626	2008 DL_{72}	—	February 26, 2008	Mount Lemmon	Mount Lemmon Survey	·	2.0 km	MPC · JPL
355627	2008 DU_{83}	—	February 18, 2008	Mount Lemmon	Mount Lemmon Survey	·	2.8 km	MPC · JPL
355628	2008 DO_{85}	—	February 28, 2008	Kitt Peak	Spacewatch	·	1.9 km	MPC · JPL
355629	2008 DZ_{88}	—	February 28, 2008	Kitt Peak	Spacewatch	TIR	2.8 km	MPC · JPL
355630	2008 EB	—	March 1, 2008	Pla D'Arguines	R. Ferrando	H	680 m	MPC · JPL
355631	2008 EX	—	February 3, 2008	Mount Lemmon	Mount Lemmon Survey	·	4.1 km	MPC · JPL
355632	2008 ES_{8}	—	March 6, 2008	Pla D'Arguines	R. Ferrando	·	4.0 km	MPC · JPL
355633	2008 EM_{15}	—	March 1, 2008	Kitt Peak	Spacewatch	·	3.9 km	MPC · JPL
355634	2008 EV_{17}	—	March 1, 2008	Kitt Peak	Spacewatch	·	4.2 km	MPC · JPL
355635	2008 EM_{23}	—	March 3, 2008	Catalina	CSS	·	4.0 km	MPC · JPL
355636	2008 EM_{25}	—	March 3, 2008	Purple Mountain	PMO NEO Survey Program	EOS	2.7 km	MPC · JPL
355637	2008 EX_{26}	—	March 4, 2008	Catalina	CSS	·	2.7 km	MPC · JPL
355638	2008 ES_{29}	—	March 4, 2008	Mount Lemmon	Mount Lemmon Survey	·	3.1 km	MPC · JPL
355639	2008 EM_{35}	—	March 2, 2008	Mount Lemmon	Mount Lemmon Survey	·	2.2 km	MPC · JPL
355640	2008 EB_{40}	—	March 4, 2008	Kitt Peak	Spacewatch	EOS	2.2 km	MPC · JPL
355641	2008 EZ_{42}	—	March 4, 2008	Mount Lemmon	Mount Lemmon Survey	·	3.9 km	MPC · JPL
355642	2008 EP_{43}	—	March 5, 2008	Mount Lemmon	Mount Lemmon Survey	H	510 m	MPC · JPL
355643	2008 EH_{44}	—	March 5, 2008	Kitt Peak	Spacewatch	·	3.7 km	MPC · JPL
355644	2008 EU_{46}	—	March 5, 2008	Mount Lemmon	Mount Lemmon Survey	·	3.5 km	MPC · JPL
355645	2008 EO_{49}	—	February 27, 2008	Mount Lemmon	Mount Lemmon Survey	·	1.7 km	MPC · JPL
355646	2008 EF_{56}	—	March 7, 2008	Mount Lemmon	Mount Lemmon Survey	·	1.6 km	MPC · JPL
355647	2008 EO_{57}	—	March 17, 1996	Kitt Peak	Spacewatch	·	3.6 km	MPC · JPL
355648	2008 EA_{60}	—	March 8, 2008	Catalina	CSS	·	3.5 km	MPC · JPL
355649	2008 EH_{60}	—	March 8, 2008	Catalina	CSS	·	4.2 km	MPC · JPL
355650	2008 EX_{63}	—	March 9, 2008	Kitt Peak	Spacewatch	HYG	2.9 km	MPC · JPL
355651	2008 EH_{66}	—	March 9, 2008	Mount Lemmon	Mount Lemmon Survey	·	3.7 km	MPC · JPL
355652	2008 EW_{67}	—	March 9, 2008	Mount Lemmon	Mount Lemmon Survey	·	2.2 km	MPC · JPL
355653	2008 EW_{68}	—	March 11, 2008	Catalina	CSS	H	620 m	MPC · JPL
355654	2008 EN_{78}	—	March 7, 2008	Kitt Peak	Spacewatch	·	5.2 km	MPC · JPL
355655	2008 EL_{84}	—	March 5, 2008	Mount Lemmon	Mount Lemmon Survey	·	2.2 km	MPC · JPL
355656	2008 EB_{86}	—	March 7, 2008	Catalina	CSS	·	2.7 km	MPC · JPL
355657 Poppy	2008 EA_{89}	Poppy	April 1, 2003	Kitt Peak	Deep Ecliptic Survey	·	3.5 km	MPC · JPL
355658	2008 ES_{89}	—	March 10, 2008	Socorro	LINEAR	·	3.5 km	MPC · JPL
355659	2008 EY_{99}	—	March 6, 2008	Catalina	CSS	·	3.7 km	MPC · JPL
355660	2008 EB_{110}	—	March 7, 2008	Kitt Peak	Spacewatch	·	3.8 km	MPC · JPL
355661	2008 EK_{111}	—	March 8, 2008	Kitt Peak	Spacewatch	·	4.8 km	MPC · JPL
355662	2008 EC_{114}	—	March 8, 2008	Kitt Peak	Spacewatch	·	3.2 km	MPC · JPL
355663	2008 EE_{114}	—	March 8, 2008	Kitt Peak	Spacewatch	·	3.1 km	MPC · JPL
355664	2008 EB_{118}	—	March 9, 2008	Mount Lemmon	Mount Lemmon Survey	KOR	1.1 km	MPC · JPL
355665	2008 EH_{122}	—	March 9, 2008	Kitt Peak	Spacewatch	·	2.5 km	MPC · JPL
355666	2008 ET_{122}	—	March 9, 2008	Kitt Peak	Spacewatch	·	3.5 km	MPC · JPL
355667	2008 EK_{127}	—	March 10, 2008	Kitt Peak	Spacewatch	·	3.6 km	MPC · JPL
355668	2008 EM_{129}	—	March 11, 2008	Kitt Peak	Spacewatch	·	3.3 km	MPC · JPL
355669	2008 EN_{130}	—	March 11, 2008	Kitt Peak	Spacewatch	·	2.9 km	MPC · JPL
355670	2008 ET_{131}	—	March 11, 2008	Kitt Peak	Spacewatch	·	3.0 km	MPC · JPL
355671	2008 EK_{132}	—	March 11, 2008	Catalina	CSS	·	2.0 km	MPC · JPL
355672	2008 EJ_{137}	—	March 11, 2008	Kitt Peak	Spacewatch	·	2.9 km	MPC · JPL
355673	2008 EB_{139}	—	March 11, 2008	Kitt Peak	Spacewatch	·	4.2 km	MPC · JPL
355674	2008 EB_{150}	—	March 6, 2008	Mount Lemmon	Mount Lemmon Survey	·	1.9 km	MPC · JPL
355675	2008 EY_{153}	—	March 15, 2008	Kitt Peak	Spacewatch	·	3.7 km	MPC · JPL
355676	2008 EA_{158}	—	March 1, 2008	Kitt Peak	Spacewatch	·	3.9 km	MPC · JPL
355677	2008 EJ_{161}	—	March 8, 2008	Kitt Peak	Spacewatch	EOS	1.9 km	MPC · JPL
355678	2008 EV_{163}	—	March 2, 2008	Catalina	CSS	·	3.3 km	MPC · JPL
355679	2008 EW_{165}	—	March 4, 2008	Mount Lemmon	Mount Lemmon Survey	VER	3.8 km	MPC · JPL
355680	2008 EE_{169}	—	March 15, 2008	Mount Lemmon	Mount Lemmon Survey	·	3.1 km	MPC · JPL
355681	2008 FS_{2}	—	March 25, 2008	Kitt Peak	Spacewatch	·	4.2 km	MPC · JPL
355682	2008 FG_{4}	—	March 25, 2008	Kitt Peak	Spacewatch	·	2.6 km	MPC · JPL
355683	2008 FE_{7}	—	March 28, 2008	Andrushivka	Andrushivka	EOS	2.5 km	MPC · JPL
355684	2008 FE_{10}	—	March 26, 2008	Kitt Peak	Spacewatch	EOS	1.9 km	MPC · JPL
355685	2008 FG_{11}	—	March 26, 2008	Mount Lemmon	Mount Lemmon Survey	·	2.3 km	MPC · JPL
355686	2008 FH_{12}	—	March 26, 2008	Mount Lemmon	Mount Lemmon Survey	TRE	2.2 km	MPC · JPL
355687	2008 FB_{16}	—	March 27, 2008	Kitt Peak	Spacewatch	·	2.0 km	MPC · JPL
355688	2008 FV_{17}	—	February 7, 2008	Kitt Peak	Spacewatch	·	2.5 km	MPC · JPL
355689	2008 FN_{19}	—	March 27, 2008	Mount Lemmon	Mount Lemmon Survey	·	2.5 km	MPC · JPL
355690	2008 FR_{21}	—	March 27, 2008	Kitt Peak	Spacewatch	·	3.2 km	MPC · JPL
355691	2008 FT_{26}	—	March 27, 2008	Kitt Peak	Spacewatch	·	2.4 km	MPC · JPL
355692	2008 FU_{27}	—	March 27, 2008	Kitt Peak	Spacewatch	·	4.3 km	MPC · JPL
355693	2008 FM_{31}	—	March 28, 2008	Mount Lemmon	Mount Lemmon Survey	HYG	2.9 km	MPC · JPL
355694	2008 FD_{34}	—	March 28, 2008	Mount Lemmon	Mount Lemmon Survey	EOS	2.1 km	MPC · JPL
355695	2008 FK_{41}	—	March 28, 2008	Kitt Peak	Spacewatch	HYG	3.1 km	MPC · JPL
355696	2008 FP_{41}	—	March 28, 2008	Mount Lemmon	Mount Lemmon Survey	EOS	1.8 km	MPC · JPL
355697	2008 FC_{42}	—	March 28, 2008	Mount Lemmon	Mount Lemmon Survey	·	3.0 km	MPC · JPL
355698	2008 FJ_{44}	—	March 1, 2008	Kitt Peak	Spacewatch	HYG	2.5 km	MPC · JPL
355699	2008 FX_{46}	—	March 28, 2008	Mount Lemmon	Mount Lemmon Survey	EOS	2.4 km	MPC · JPL
355700	2008 FW_{50}	—	March 28, 2008	Mount Lemmon	Mount Lemmon Survey	·	2.9 km	MPC · JPL

== 355701–355800 ==
back to top

Designation			Discovery			Properties		Ref
Permanent	Provisional	Named after	Date	Site	Discoverer(s)	Category	Diam.	Ref
355701	2008 FE_{58}	—	March 28, 2008	Mount Lemmon	Mount Lemmon Survey	THM	2.6 km	MPC · JPL
355702	2008 FG_{59}	—	March 29, 2008	Mount Lemmon	Mount Lemmon Survey	H	510 m	MPC · JPL
355703	2008 FJ_{63}	—	March 27, 2008	Kitt Peak	Spacewatch	·	3.4 km	MPC · JPL
355704 Wangyinglai	2008 FW_{75}	Wangyinglai	March 3, 2008	XuYi	PMO NEO Survey Program	·	3.3 km	MPC · JPL
355705	2008 FC_{88}	—	March 28, 2008	Mount Lemmon	Mount Lemmon Survey	THM	2.3 km	MPC · JPL
355706	2008 FM_{88}	—	March 28, 2008	Mount Lemmon	Mount Lemmon Survey	THM	2.1 km	MPC · JPL
355707	2008 FC_{89}	—	March 28, 2008	Mount Lemmon	Mount Lemmon Survey	EOS	1.9 km	MPC · JPL
355708	2008 FW_{93}	—	March 29, 2008	Kitt Peak	Spacewatch	·	4.2 km	MPC · JPL
355709	2008 FH_{104}	—	March 30, 2008	Kitt Peak	Spacewatch	HYG	3.1 km	MPC · JPL
355710	2008 FA_{108}	—	March 31, 2008	Kitt Peak	Spacewatch	fast	4.0 km	MPC · JPL
355711	2008 FD_{122}	—	March 31, 2008	Mount Lemmon	Mount Lemmon Survey	THB	2.6 km	MPC · JPL
355712	2008 FL_{125}	—	March 31, 2008	Kitt Peak	Spacewatch	·	2.8 km	MPC · JPL
355713	2008 FY_{125}	—	March 31, 2008	Catalina	CSS	·	6.0 km	MPC · JPL
355714	2008 FT_{127}	—	March 26, 2008	Kitt Peak	Spacewatch	·	3.9 km	MPC · JPL
355715	2008 FJ_{128}	—	March 28, 2008	Kitt Peak	Spacewatch	THM	2.5 km	MPC · JPL
355716	2008 FQ_{130}	—	March 30, 2008	Catalina	CSS	·	3.8 km	MPC · JPL
355717	2008 FJ_{135}	—	February 28, 2008	Kitt Peak	Spacewatch	·	2.2 km	MPC · JPL
355718	2008 FY_{135}	—	March 31, 2008	Catalina	CSS	·	3.5 km	MPC · JPL
355719	2008 FK_{136}	—	March 27, 2008	Kitt Peak	Spacewatch	·	5.9 km	MPC · JPL
355720	2008 GG_{5}	—	April 1, 2008	Kitt Peak	Spacewatch	·	2.4 km	MPC · JPL
355721	2008 GT_{12}	—	September 1, 2005	Kitt Peak	Spacewatch	·	2.6 km	MPC · JPL
355722	2008 GN_{23}	—	April 1, 2008	Mount Lemmon	Mount Lemmon Survey	·	2.7 km	MPC · JPL
355723	2008 GN_{31}	—	April 3, 2008	Kitt Peak	Spacewatch	·	4.1 km	MPC · JPL
355724	2008 GX_{31}	—	April 3, 2008	Kitt Peak	Spacewatch	·	3.4 km	MPC · JPL
355725	2008 GG_{35}	—	April 3, 2008	Kitt Peak	Spacewatch	·	2.8 km	MPC · JPL
355726	2008 GX_{52}	—	April 5, 2008	Mount Lemmon	Mount Lemmon Survey	·	2.5 km	MPC · JPL
355727	2008 GP_{60}	—	April 5, 2008	Catalina	CSS	·	2.8 km	MPC · JPL
355728	2008 GT_{69}	—	April 6, 2008	Mount Lemmon	Mount Lemmon Survey	CYB	5.3 km	MPC · JPL
355729	2008 GX_{89}	—	April 6, 2008	Mount Lemmon	Mount Lemmon Survey	·	5.2 km	MPC · JPL
355730	2008 GK_{96}	—	April 8, 2008	Kitt Peak	Spacewatch	·	2.7 km	MPC · JPL
355731	2008 GR_{110}	—	April 3, 2008	Catalina	CSS	H	690 m	MPC · JPL
355732	2008 GC_{111}	—	April 3, 2008	Catalina	CSS	H	710 m	MPC · JPL
355733	2008 GA_{112}	—	April 1, 2008	Catalina	CSS	·	4.1 km	MPC · JPL
355734	2008 GF_{114}	—	February 12, 2008	Mount Lemmon	Mount Lemmon Survey	·	3.4 km	MPC · JPL
355735	2008 GQ_{120}	—	April 12, 2008	Catalina	CSS	·	3.7 km	MPC · JPL
355736	2008 GC_{122}	—	April 13, 2008	Kitt Peak	Spacewatch	·	2.9 km	MPC · JPL
355737	2008 GG_{143}	—	March 29, 2008	Catalina	CSS	·	4.3 km	MPC · JPL
355738	2008 GN_{144}	—	April 4, 2008	Catalina	CSS	·	1.9 km	MPC · JPL
355739	2008 HU	—	April 24, 2008	Mount Lemmon	Mount Lemmon Survey	·	3.5 km	MPC · JPL
355740	2008 HV_{3}	—	April 28, 2008	La Sagra	OAM	·	2.8 km	MPC · JPL
355741	2008 HX_{7}	—	April 24, 2008	Kitt Peak	Spacewatch	·	3.1 km	MPC · JPL
355742	2008 HA_{9}	—	April 24, 2008	Kitt Peak	Spacewatch	·	3.0 km	MPC · JPL
355743	2008 HK_{16}	—	April 25, 2008	Kitt Peak	Spacewatch	·	3.2 km	MPC · JPL
355744	2008 HB_{23}	—	April 27, 2008	Kitt Peak	Spacewatch	VER	2.3 km	MPC · JPL
355745	2008 HS_{55}	—	April 29, 2008	Kitt Peak	Spacewatch	·	3.0 km	MPC · JPL
355746	2008 HW_{62}	—	September 7, 2004	Kitt Peak	Spacewatch	·	2.8 km	MPC · JPL
355747	2008 HJ_{63}	—	April 29, 2008	Kitt Peak	Spacewatch	LIX	4.1 km	MPC · JPL
355748	2008 HT_{63}	—	April 7, 2008	Catalina	CSS	TIR	3.3 km	MPC · JPL
355749	2008 HE_{67}	—	April 26, 2008	Kitt Peak	Spacewatch	·	3.4 km	MPC · JPL
355750	2008 HS_{68}	—	April 26, 2008	Kitt Peak	Spacewatch	·	4.3 km	MPC · JPL
355751	2008 JO_{22}	—	May 6, 2008	Siding Spring	SSS	(895)	4.5 km	MPC · JPL
355752	2008 JM_{35}	—	May 4, 2008	Siding Spring	SSS	H	710 m	MPC · JPL
355753	2008 PB_{18}	—	August 13, 2008	Pla D'Arguines	R. Ferrando	·	640 m	MPC · JPL
355754	2008 QZ_{15}	—	August 21, 2008	Kitt Peak	Spacewatch	·	630 m	MPC · JPL
355755	2008 QS_{24}	—	July 29, 2008	Kitt Peak	Spacewatch	L4	8.2 km	MPC · JPL
355756	2008 QL_{37}	—	August 21, 2008	Kitt Peak	Spacewatch	L4 · ERY	8.9 km	MPC · JPL
355757	2008 QR_{41}	—	August 21, 2008	Kitt Peak	Spacewatch	L4	10 km	MPC · JPL
355758	2008 QM_{42}	—	August 24, 2008	Kitt Peak	Spacewatch	L4	7.7 km	MPC · JPL
355759	2008 RE	—	September 1, 2008	Hibiscus	S. F. Hönig, Teamo, N.	·	820 m	MPC · JPL
355760	2008 RQ_{10}	—	September 3, 2008	Kitt Peak	Spacewatch	L4	10 km	MPC · JPL
355761	2008 RH_{11}	—	September 3, 2008	Kitt Peak	Spacewatch	3:2 · SHU	7.4 km	MPC · JPL
355762	2008 RQ_{21}	—	September 4, 2008	Kitt Peak	Spacewatch	L4	9.9 km	MPC · JPL
355763	2008 RS_{31}	—	September 2, 2008	Kitt Peak	Spacewatch	·	700 m	MPC · JPL
355764	2008 RM_{33}	—	September 2, 2008	Kitt Peak	Spacewatch	·	730 m	MPC · JPL
355765	2008 RK_{37}	—	September 2, 2008	Kitt Peak	Spacewatch	L4 · ERY	11 km	MPC · JPL
355766	2008 RR_{38}	—	September 2, 2008	Kitt Peak	Spacewatch	L4	8.0 km	MPC · JPL
355767	2008 RK_{45}	—	September 2, 2008	Kitt Peak	Spacewatch	·	810 m	MPC · JPL
355768	2008 RY_{57}	—	September 3, 2008	Kitt Peak	Spacewatch	L4	10 km	MPC · JPL
355769	2008 RP_{62}	—	September 4, 2008	Kitt Peak	Spacewatch	L4	6.8 km	MPC · JPL
355770	2008 RE_{80}	—	September 11, 2008	Bergisch Gladbach	W. Bickel	AMO +1km	1.2 km	MPC · JPL
355771	2008 RD_{112}	—	September 4, 2008	Kitt Peak	Spacewatch	·	750 m	MPC · JPL
355772	2008 RQ_{117}	—	September 9, 2008	Kitt Peak	Spacewatch	·	1.2 km	MPC · JPL
355773	2008 RR_{120}	—	September 7, 2008	Catalina	CSS	TIR	3.2 km	MPC · JPL
355774	2008 RA_{122}	—	September 3, 2008	Kitt Peak	Spacewatch	L4	7.8 km	MPC · JPL
355775	2008 RK_{123}	—	September 6, 2008	Kitt Peak	Spacewatch	L4	7.5 km	MPC · JPL
355776	2008 RM_{123}	—	February 20, 2002	Kitt Peak	Spacewatch	L4	7.5 km	MPC · JPL
355777	2008 RV_{123}	—	September 6, 2008	Mount Lemmon	Mount Lemmon Survey	L4	7.6 km	MPC · JPL
355778	2008 RA_{125}	—	September 7, 2008	Mount Lemmon	Mount Lemmon Survey	L4	10 km	MPC · JPL
355779	2008 RY_{125}	—	September 9, 2008	Mount Lemmon	Mount Lemmon Survey	L4	8.9 km	MPC · JPL
355780	2008 RR_{126}	—	September 4, 2008	Kitt Peak	Spacewatch	L4	8.2 km	MPC · JPL
355781	2008 RZ_{126}	—	September 5, 2008	Kitt Peak	Spacewatch	L4	9.7 km	MPC · JPL
355782	2008 RY_{127}	—	September 6, 2008	Kitt Peak	Spacewatch	L4	8.1 km	MPC · JPL
355783	2008 RZ_{137}	—	September 5, 2008	Kitt Peak	Spacewatch	·	640 m	MPC · JPL
355784	2008 RY_{139}	—	September 7, 2008	Catalina	CSS	·	690 m	MPC · JPL
355785	2008 SC_{25}	—	September 19, 2001	Socorro	LINEAR	·	760 m	MPC · JPL
355786	2008 SV_{41}	—	September 20, 2008	Mount Lemmon	Mount Lemmon Survey	·	690 m	MPC · JPL
355787	2008 SM_{43}	—	September 20, 2008	Kitt Peak	Spacewatch	·	560 m	MPC · JPL
355788	2008 SX_{50}	—	August 23, 2008	Kitt Peak	Spacewatch	L4	10 km	MPC · JPL
355789	2008 SA_{57}	—	September 20, 2008	Kitt Peak	Spacewatch	·	890 m	MPC · JPL
355790	2008 SZ_{65}	—	September 21, 2008	Mount Lemmon	Mount Lemmon Survey	·	1.0 km	MPC · JPL
355791	2008 SW_{85}	—	September 20, 2008	Kitt Peak	Spacewatch	L4	8.2 km	MPC · JPL
355792	2008 SN_{88}	—	September 20, 2008	Kitt Peak	Spacewatch	·	770 m	MPC · JPL
355793	2008 SZ_{93}	—	September 21, 2008	Kitt Peak	Spacewatch	·	670 m	MPC · JPL
355794	2008 SU_{105}	—	September 21, 2008	Kitt Peak	Spacewatch	·	700 m	MPC · JPL
355795	2008 SM_{112}	—	September 22, 2008	Kitt Peak	Spacewatch	·	750 m	MPC · JPL
355796	2008 SM_{125}	—	September 22, 2008	Mount Lemmon	Mount Lemmon Survey	·	950 m	MPC · JPL
355797	2008 ST_{141}	—	September 24, 2008	Catalina	CSS	·	1.5 km	MPC · JPL
355798	2008 SH_{153}	—	September 22, 2008	Socorro	LINEAR	·	770 m	MPC · JPL
355799	2008 SO_{159}	—	September 24, 2008	Socorro	LINEAR	·	910 m	MPC · JPL
355800	2008 SA_{165}	—	September 28, 2008	Socorro	LINEAR	·	790 m	MPC · JPL

== 355801–355900 ==
back to top

Designation			Discovery			Properties		Ref
Permanent	Provisional	Named after	Date	Site	Discoverer(s)	Category	Diam.	Ref
355801	2008 SY_{199}	—	September 26, 2008	Kitt Peak	Spacewatch	·	580 m	MPC · JPL
355802	2008 SA_{242}	—	September 29, 2008	Catalina	CSS	·	870 m	MPC · JPL
355803	2008 SB_{244}	—	September 24, 2008	Kitt Peak	Spacewatch	·	660 m	MPC · JPL
355804	2008 SF_{253}	—	September 21, 2008	Kitt Peak	Spacewatch	·	690 m	MPC · JPL
355805	2008 SS_{253}	—	September 22, 2008	Kitt Peak	Spacewatch	·	730 m	MPC · JPL
355806	2008 SZ_{259}	—	September 23, 2008	Kitt Peak	Spacewatch	·	660 m	MPC · JPL
355807	2008 SF_{269}	—	September 21, 2008	Kitt Peak	Spacewatch	·	710 m	MPC · JPL
355808	2008 SK_{275}	—	September 23, 2008	Kitt Peak	Spacewatch	L4	10 km	MPC · JPL
355809	2008 SK_{277}	—	September 24, 2008	Mount Lemmon	Mount Lemmon Survey	L4	8.5 km	MPC · JPL
355810	2008 SX_{279}	—	April 4, 2003	Kitt Peak	Spacewatch	L4	10 km	MPC · JPL
355811	2008 SM_{284}	—	September 24, 2008	Kitt Peak	Spacewatch	V	690 m	MPC · JPL
355812	2008 TE_{22}	—	October 1, 2008	Mount Lemmon	Mount Lemmon Survey	·	600 m	MPC · JPL
355813	2008 TZ_{23}	—	October 2, 2008	Kitt Peak	Spacewatch	L4	7.7 km	MPC · JPL
355814	2008 TU_{37}	—	October 1, 2008	Mount Lemmon	Mount Lemmon Survey	L4 · ERY	9.5 km	MPC · JPL
355815	2008 TZ_{45}	—	October 1, 2008	Kitt Peak	Spacewatch	·	770 m	MPC · JPL
355816	2008 TN_{58}	—	October 2, 2008	Kitt Peak	Spacewatch	L4	8.7 km	MPC · JPL
355817	2008 TU_{74}	—	October 2, 2008	Kitt Peak	Spacewatch	·	670 m	MPC · JPL
355818	2008 TL_{76}	—	October 2, 2008	Mount Lemmon	Mount Lemmon Survey	L4	7.3 km	MPC · JPL
355819	2008 TB_{83}	—	October 3, 2008	La Sagra	OAM	·	700 m	MPC · JPL
355820	2008 TY_{96}	—	October 6, 2008	Kitt Peak	Spacewatch	L4	8.3 km	MPC · JPL
355821	2008 TK_{98}	—	October 6, 2008	Kitt Peak	Spacewatch	·	630 m	MPC · JPL
355822	2008 TY_{106}	—	September 3, 2008	Kitt Peak	Spacewatch	L4	8.8 km	MPC · JPL
355823	2008 TS_{110}	—	October 6, 2008	Catalina	CSS	·	860 m	MPC · JPL
355824	2008 TR_{115}	—	October 6, 2008	Catalina	CSS	·	1.0 km	MPC · JPL
355825	2008 TZ_{115}	—	October 6, 2008	Mount Lemmon	Mount Lemmon Survey	·	600 m	MPC · JPL
355826	2008 TJ_{127}	—	October 8, 2008	Mount Lemmon	Mount Lemmon Survey	·	1.1 km	MPC · JPL
355827	2008 TC_{157}	—	October 10, 2008	Kitt Peak	Spacewatch	·	840 m	MPC · JPL
355828	2008 TZ_{162}	—	October 1, 2008	Kitt Peak	Spacewatch	·	740 m	MPC · JPL
355829	2008 TH_{170}	—	October 8, 2008	Kitt Peak	Spacewatch	·	1.4 km	MPC · JPL
355830	2008 TS_{174}	—	March 21, 2002	Kitt Peak	Spacewatch	L4	8.4 km	MPC · JPL
355831	2008 TJ_{177}	—	October 2, 2008	Catalina	CSS	·	900 m	MPC · JPL
355832	2008 TX_{183}	—	October 3, 2008	Socorro	LINEAR	·	740 m	MPC · JPL
355833	2008 TL_{186}	—	October 7, 2008	Catalina	CSS	·	750 m	MPC · JPL
355834	2008 UY_{6}	—	October 25, 2008	Goodricke-Pigott	R. A. Tucker	·	1.0 km	MPC · JPL
355835	2008 UW_{9}	—	October 17, 2008	Kitt Peak	Spacewatch	L4	9.3 km	MPC · JPL
355836	2008 UN_{15}	—	September 21, 2008	Kitt Peak	Spacewatch	L4	9.9 km	MPC · JPL
355837	2008 UF_{33}	—	October 20, 2008	Kitt Peak	Spacewatch	·	1.0 km	MPC · JPL
355838	2008 UQ_{42}	—	October 20, 2008	Kitt Peak	Spacewatch	·	980 m	MPC · JPL
355839	2008 UX_{47}	—	October 20, 2008	Kitt Peak	Spacewatch	·	2.4 km	MPC · JPL
355840	2008 UW_{51}	—	October 20, 2008	Kitt Peak	Spacewatch	·	1.2 km	MPC · JPL
355841	2008 UW_{52}	—	September 24, 2008	Mount Lemmon	Mount Lemmon Survey	·	930 m	MPC · JPL
355842	2008 UU_{55}	—	October 21, 2008	Kitt Peak	Spacewatch	L4	8.7 km	MPC · JPL
355843	2008 UD_{90}	—	October 25, 2008	Dauban	Kugel, F.	·	1.6 km	MPC · JPL
355844	2008 UJ_{91}	—	October 27, 2008	Socorro	LINEAR	PHO	2.0 km	MPC · JPL
355845	2008 US_{98}	—	September 7, 2008	Catalina	CSS	·	790 m	MPC · JPL
355846	2008 UH_{103}	—	September 23, 2008	Kitt Peak	Spacewatch	·	820 m	MPC · JPL
355847	2008 UH_{104}	—	October 20, 2008	Mount Lemmon	Mount Lemmon Survey	·	780 m	MPC · JPL
355848	2008 UW_{108}	—	October 21, 2008	Kitt Peak	Spacewatch	·	1.5 km	MPC · JPL
355849	2008 UM_{109}	—	August 24, 2008	Kitt Peak	Spacewatch	L4 · ERY	9.0 km	MPC · JPL
355850	2008 UR_{131}	—	October 23, 2008	Kitt Peak	Spacewatch	·	680 m	MPC · JPL
355851	2008 UK_{151}	—	October 23, 2008	Kitt Peak	Spacewatch	·	740 m	MPC · JPL
355852	2008 UB_{157}	—	October 23, 2008	Mount Lemmon	Mount Lemmon Survey	·	950 m	MPC · JPL
355853	2008 UH_{159}	—	October 23, 2008	Mount Lemmon	Mount Lemmon Survey	·	1.2 km	MPC · JPL
355854	2008 UM_{182}	—	October 24, 2008	Mount Lemmon	Mount Lemmon Survey	·	680 m	MPC · JPL
355855	2008 UY_{198}	—	October 27, 2008	Socorro	LINEAR	·	1.4 km	MPC · JPL
355856	2008 UQ_{224}	—	October 25, 2008	Kitt Peak	Spacewatch	·	580 m	MPC · JPL
355857	2008 UT_{230}	—	October 26, 2008	Kitt Peak	Spacewatch	L4	9.5 km	MPC · JPL
355858	2008 UD_{245}	—	October 26, 2008	Kitt Peak	Spacewatch	·	1.3 km	MPC · JPL
355859	2008 UN_{248}	—	October 26, 2008	Kitt Peak	Spacewatch	·	1.3 km	MPC · JPL
355860	2008 UR_{254}	—	October 27, 2008	Kitt Peak	Spacewatch	MAS	610 m	MPC · JPL
355861	2008 UQ_{258}	—	October 27, 2008	Kitt Peak	Spacewatch	·	720 m	MPC · JPL
355862	2008 UK_{272}	—	October 28, 2008	Kitt Peak	Spacewatch	·	1.0 km	MPC · JPL
355863	2008 UD_{273}	—	September 29, 2008	Mount Lemmon	Mount Lemmon Survey	·	840 m	MPC · JPL
355864	2008 UT_{290}	—	October 28, 2008	Kitt Peak	Spacewatch	V	700 m	MPC · JPL
355865	2008 UA_{291}	—	October 28, 2008	Kitt Peak	Spacewatch	·	1.4 km	MPC · JPL
355866	2008 UY_{308}	—	October 30, 2008	Kitt Peak	Spacewatch	·	720 m	MPC · JPL
355867	2008 UM_{312}	—	October 30, 2008	Kitt Peak	Spacewatch	·	950 m	MPC · JPL
355868	2008 UO_{316}	—	October 30, 2008	Kitt Peak	Spacewatch	·	1.1 km	MPC · JPL
355869	2008 UW_{329}	—	October 31, 2008	Kitt Peak	Spacewatch	·	690 m	MPC · JPL
355870	2008 US_{353}	—	October 20, 2008	Kitt Peak	Spacewatch	·	800 m	MPC · JPL
355871	2008 UU_{354}	—	October 27, 2008	Mount Lemmon	Mount Lemmon Survey	·	830 m	MPC · JPL
355872	2008 UW_{361}	—	October 10, 2008	Mount Lemmon	Mount Lemmon Survey	·	800 m	MPC · JPL
355873	2008 VK_{2}	—	November 2, 2008	Socorro	LINEAR	·	980 m	MPC · JPL
355874	2008 VY_{23}	—	November 1, 2008	Kitt Peak	Spacewatch	·	1.2 km	MPC · JPL
355875	2008 VU_{24}	—	November 1, 2008	Kitt Peak	Spacewatch	·	1.1 km	MPC · JPL
355876	2008 VK_{25}	—	November 2, 2008	Kitt Peak	Spacewatch	NYS	800 m	MPC · JPL
355877	2008 VM_{28}	—	November 2, 2008	Catalina	CSS	PHO	1.2 km	MPC · JPL
355878	2008 VH_{32}	—	November 2, 2008	Mount Lemmon	Mount Lemmon Survey	·	1.7 km	MPC · JPL
355879	2008 VR_{39}	—	November 2, 2008	Kitt Peak	Spacewatch	·	970 m	MPC · JPL
355880	2008 VO_{41}	—	September 23, 2008	Catalina	CSS	·	930 m	MPC · JPL
355881	2008 VD_{51}	—	November 4, 2008	Kitt Peak	Spacewatch	·	1.3 km	MPC · JPL
355882	2008 VP_{66}	—	November 3, 2008	Catalina	CSS	·	840 m	MPC · JPL
355883	2008 VU_{71}	—	November 8, 2008	Mount Lemmon	Mount Lemmon Survey	MAS	830 m	MPC · JPL
355884	2008 VJ_{74}	—	November 7, 2008	Kitt Peak	Spacewatch	V	720 m	MPC · JPL
355885	2008 WG_{4}	—	November 17, 2008	Kitt Peak	Spacewatch	·	770 m	MPC · JPL
355886	2008 WW_{4}	—	November 17, 2008	Kitt Peak	Spacewatch	·	850 m	MPC · JPL
355887	2008 WL_{11}	—	November 18, 2008	Catalina	CSS	NYS	1.0 km	MPC · JPL
355888	2008 WB_{42}	—	October 31, 2008	Kitt Peak	Spacewatch	·	1.0 km	MPC · JPL
355889	2008 WK_{43}	—	November 17, 2008	Kitt Peak	Spacewatch	·	890 m	MPC · JPL
355890	2008 WD_{46}	—	November 17, 2008	Kitt Peak	Spacewatch	·	770 m	MPC · JPL
355891	2008 WE_{46}	—	November 17, 2008	Kitt Peak	Spacewatch	·	940 m	MPC · JPL
355892	2008 WL_{46}	—	November 17, 2008	Kitt Peak	Spacewatch	·	850 m	MPC · JPL
355893	2008 WB_{48}	—	November 6, 2008	Mount Lemmon	Mount Lemmon Survey	·	1.3 km	MPC · JPL
355894	2008 WA_{50}	—	September 27, 2008	Mount Lemmon	Mount Lemmon Survey	MIS	2.7 km	MPC · JPL
355895	2008 WB_{50}	—	November 18, 2008	Kitt Peak	Spacewatch	PHO	1.0 km	MPC · JPL
355896	2008 WH_{50}	—	November 18, 2008	Kitt Peak	Spacewatch	NYS	1.3 km	MPC · JPL
355897	2008 WW_{61}	—	November 22, 2008	La Sagra	OAM	·	1.5 km	MPC · JPL
355898	2008 WT_{66}	—	November 18, 2008	Kitt Peak	Spacewatch	·	730 m	MPC · JPL
355899	2008 WR_{67}	—	November 18, 2008	Kitt Peak	Spacewatch	MAS	660 m	MPC · JPL
355900	2008 WQ_{68}	—	November 18, 2008	Kitt Peak	Spacewatch	MAS	800 m	MPC · JPL

== 355901–356000 ==
back to top

Designation			Discovery			Properties		Ref
Permanent	Provisional	Named after	Date	Site	Discoverer(s)	Category	Diam.	Ref
355901	2008 WN_{72}	—	November 19, 2008	Mount Lemmon	Mount Lemmon Survey	MAS	650 m	MPC · JPL
355902	2008 WO_{73}	—	November 19, 2008	Mount Lemmon	Mount Lemmon Survey	·	1.7 km	MPC · JPL
355903	2008 WS_{90}	—	November 23, 2008	La Sagra	OAM	V	720 m	MPC · JPL
355904	2008 WY_{102}	—	November 27, 2008	La Sagra	OAM	·	1.3 km	MPC · JPL
355905	2008 WA_{104}	—	November 30, 2008	Catalina	CSS	·	880 m	MPC · JPL
355906	2008 WB_{113}	—	November 30, 2008	Kitt Peak	Spacewatch	·	1.2 km	MPC · JPL
355907	2008 WQ_{120}	—	November 22, 2008	Kitt Peak	Spacewatch	·	1.1 km	MPC · JPL
355908	2008 XE_{12}	—	December 2, 2008	Mount Lemmon	Mount Lemmon Survey	·	1.0 km	MPC · JPL
355909	2008 XV_{20}	—	December 1, 2008	Kitt Peak	Spacewatch	·	1.2 km	MPC · JPL
355910	2008 XQ_{33}	—	December 2, 2008	Kitt Peak	Spacewatch	V	580 m	MPC · JPL
355911	2008 XM_{35}	—	December 2, 2008	Kitt Peak	Spacewatch	·	1.1 km	MPC · JPL
355912	2008 XF_{43}	—	November 3, 2004	Palomar	NEAT	V	1.0 km	MPC · JPL
355913	2008 XW_{44}	—	December 3, 2008	Catalina	CSS	·	1.5 km	MPC · JPL
355914	2008 XR_{48}	—	December 4, 2008	Kitt Peak	Spacewatch	·	1.5 km	MPC · JPL
355915	2008 XQ_{49}	—	December 3, 2008	Mount Lemmon	Mount Lemmon Survey	PHO	1.3 km	MPC · JPL
355916	2008 YL_{1}	—	December 20, 2008	La Sagra	OAM	·	1.7 km	MPC · JPL
355917	2008 YT_{2}	—	December 21, 2008	Mayhill	Lowe, A.	·	930 m	MPC · JPL
355918	2008 YF_{5}	—	November 20, 2008	Kitt Peak	Spacewatch	·	1.4 km	MPC · JPL
355919	2008 YD_{13}	—	December 21, 2008	Kitt Peak	Spacewatch	·	1.6 km	MPC · JPL
355920	2008 YQ_{13}	—	December 21, 2008	Mount Lemmon	Mount Lemmon Survey	·	1.8 km	MPC · JPL
355921	2008 YC_{15}	—	November 30, 2008	Kitt Peak	Spacewatch	·	1.3 km	MPC · JPL
355922	2008 YU_{20}	—	December 21, 2008	Mount Lemmon	Mount Lemmon Survey	NYS	1.5 km	MPC · JPL
355923	2008 YN_{25}	—	December 24, 2008	Piszkéstető	K. Sárneczky	·	1.2 km	MPC · JPL
355924	2008 YS_{29}	—	December 29, 2008	Tzec Maun	Tozzi, F.	·	1.4 km	MPC · JPL
355925	2008 YA_{38}	—	December 27, 2008	Bergisch Gladbach	W. Bickel	NYS	1.2 km	MPC · JPL
355926	2008 YN_{42}	—	December 29, 2008	Kitt Peak	Spacewatch	V	610 m	MPC · JPL
355927	2008 YN_{46}	—	December 29, 2008	Mount Lemmon	Mount Lemmon Survey	NYS	1.4 km	MPC · JPL
355928	2008 YO_{47}	—	March 24, 2006	Kitt Peak	Spacewatch	NYS	1.3 km	MPC · JPL
355929	2008 YP_{48}	—	December 29, 2008	Mount Lemmon	Mount Lemmon Survey	·	1.0 km	MPC · JPL
355930	2008 YX_{48}	—	December 29, 2008	Mount Lemmon	Mount Lemmon Survey	MAS	890 m	MPC · JPL
355931	2008 YU_{49}	—	December 29, 2008	Mount Lemmon	Mount Lemmon Survey	·	1.6 km	MPC · JPL
355932	2008 YU_{51}	—	December 29, 2008	Mount Lemmon	Mount Lemmon Survey	V	820 m	MPC · JPL
355933	2008 YC_{55}	—	December 29, 2008	Mount Lemmon	Mount Lemmon Survey	V	860 m	MPC · JPL
355934	2008 YT_{56}	—	November 11, 2004	Kitt Peak	Spacewatch	·	1.4 km	MPC · JPL
355935	2008 YV_{58}	—	December 30, 2008	Kitt Peak	Spacewatch	MAS	670 m	MPC · JPL
355936	2008 YV_{70}	—	May 5, 2006	Anderson Mesa	LONEOS	·	1.5 km	MPC · JPL
355937	2008 YU_{71}	—	December 30, 2008	Kitt Peak	Spacewatch	·	1.1 km	MPC · JPL
355938	2008 YJ_{74}	—	December 30, 2008	Kitt Peak	Spacewatch	·	1.1 km	MPC · JPL
355939	2008 YJ_{78}	—	December 30, 2008	Mount Lemmon	Mount Lemmon Survey	·	1.3 km	MPC · JPL
355940	2008 YG_{79}	—	December 30, 2008	Mount Lemmon	Mount Lemmon Survey	NYS	1.2 km	MPC · JPL
355941	2008 YG_{88}	—	December 29, 2008	Kitt Peak	Spacewatch	·	1.1 km	MPC · JPL
355942	2008 YM_{93}	—	December 29, 2008	Kitt Peak	Spacewatch	NYS	1.1 km	MPC · JPL
355943	2008 YQ_{99}	—	December 29, 2008	Kitt Peak	Spacewatch	NYS	1.6 km	MPC · JPL
355944	2008 YD_{103}	—	December 29, 2008	Kitt Peak	Spacewatch	·	1.7 km	MPC · JPL
355945	2008 YY_{104}	—	December 29, 2008	Kitt Peak	Spacewatch	·	1.4 km	MPC · JPL
355946	2008 YU_{106}	—	December 29, 2008	Kitt Peak	Spacewatch	MAS	780 m	MPC · JPL
355947	2008 YW_{107}	—	December 29, 2008	Kitt Peak	Spacewatch	·	1.6 km	MPC · JPL
355948	2008 YX_{115}	—	December 29, 2008	Kitt Peak	Spacewatch	·	1.1 km	MPC · JPL
355949	2008 YQ_{125}	—	December 30, 2008	Kitt Peak	Spacewatch	·	1.3 km	MPC · JPL
355950	2008 YZ_{125}	—	December 30, 2008	Kitt Peak	Spacewatch	·	1.6 km	MPC · JPL
355951	2008 YD_{126}	—	December 30, 2008	Kitt Peak	Spacewatch	NYS	1.5 km	MPC · JPL
355952	2008 YW_{126}	—	December 30, 2008	Kitt Peak	Spacewatch	·	1.8 km	MPC · JPL
355953	2008 YO_{127}	—	December 30, 2008	Kitt Peak	Spacewatch	·	1.2 km	MPC · JPL
355954	2008 YW_{128}	—	December 31, 2008	Kitt Peak	Spacewatch	·	1.2 km	MPC · JPL
355955	2008 YQ_{141}	—	December 30, 2008	Kitt Peak	Spacewatch	·	1.7 km	MPC · JPL
355956	2008 YZ_{144}	—	December 30, 2008	Kitt Peak	Spacewatch	·	1.6 km	MPC · JPL
355957	2008 YB_{149}	—	December 31, 2008	Kitt Peak	Spacewatch	·	2.6 km	MPC · JPL
355958	2008 YO_{149}	—	December 21, 2008	Mount Lemmon	Mount Lemmon Survey	·	1.2 km	MPC · JPL
355959	2008 YO_{152}	—	December 29, 2008	Mount Lemmon	Mount Lemmon Survey	·	1.0 km	MPC · JPL
355960	2008 YR_{153}	—	December 21, 2008	Mount Lemmon	Mount Lemmon Survey	·	1.3 km	MPC · JPL
355961	2008 YP_{155}	—	December 22, 2008	Kitt Peak	Spacewatch	V	810 m	MPC · JPL
355962	2008 YT_{155}	—	December 22, 2008	Kitt Peak	Spacewatch	NYS	1.4 km	MPC · JPL
355963	2008 YR_{157}	—	December 29, 2008	Kitt Peak	Spacewatch	NYS	1.1 km	MPC · JPL
355964	2008 YO_{164}	—	December 29, 2008	Mount Lemmon	Mount Lemmon Survey	·	1.5 km	MPC · JPL
355965	2008 YJ_{167}	—	December 21, 2008	Socorro	LINEAR	NYS	1.2 km	MPC · JPL
355966	2008 YP_{167}	—	December 21, 2008	Catalina	CSS	·	1.9 km	MPC · JPL
355967	2008 YH_{172}	—	December 31, 2008	Kitt Peak	Spacewatch	·	1.4 km	MPC · JPL
355968	2009 AF_{1}	—	November 8, 2008	Mount Lemmon	Mount Lemmon Survey	·	1.6 km	MPC · JPL
355969	2009 AA_{5}	—	November 14, 1999	Socorro	LINEAR	·	1.4 km	MPC · JPL
355970	2009 AQ_{8}	—	October 24, 2008	Mount Lemmon	Mount Lemmon Survey	·	1.5 km	MPC · JPL
355971	2009 AN_{13}	—	January 2, 2009	Mount Lemmon	Mount Lemmon Survey	·	1 km	MPC · JPL
355972	2009 AB_{17}	—	January 2, 2009	Mount Lemmon	Mount Lemmon Survey	·	1.5 km	MPC · JPL
355973	2009 AR_{19}	—	January 2, 2009	Mount Lemmon	Mount Lemmon Survey	·	2.0 km	MPC · JPL
355974	2009 AD_{20}	—	January 2, 2009	Mount Lemmon	Mount Lemmon Survey	·	1.4 km	MPC · JPL
355975	2009 AH_{22}	—	January 3, 2009	Kitt Peak	Spacewatch	·	1.2 km	MPC · JPL
355976	2009 AM_{24}	—	January 3, 2009	Kitt Peak	Spacewatch	NYS	1.1 km	MPC · JPL
355977	2009 AG_{27}	—	December 22, 2008	Kitt Peak	Spacewatch	·	1.1 km	MPC · JPL
355978	2009 AA_{28}	—	January 2, 2009	Mount Lemmon	Mount Lemmon Survey	PHO	2.8 km	MPC · JPL
355979	2009 AH_{28}	—	January 8, 2009	Kitt Peak	Spacewatch	·	1.2 km	MPC · JPL
355980	2009 AA_{39}	—	January 15, 2009	Kitt Peak	Spacewatch	·	1.4 km	MPC · JPL
355981	2009 AF_{39}	—	December 22, 2008	Mount Lemmon	Mount Lemmon Survey	NYS	1.3 km	MPC · JPL
355982	2009 AW_{42}	—	January 2, 2009	Mount Lemmon	Mount Lemmon Survey	·	2.4 km	MPC · JPL
355983	2009 AT_{43}	—	January 2, 2009	Mount Lemmon	Mount Lemmon Survey	·	1.6 km	MPC · JPL
355984	2009 AM_{44}	—	January 3, 2009	Mount Lemmon	Mount Lemmon Survey	·	1.7 km	MPC · JPL
355985	2009 AV_{44}	—	January 8, 2009	Kitt Peak	Spacewatch	·	2.3 km	MPC · JPL
355986	2009 AL_{47}	—	January 2, 2009	Mount Lemmon	Mount Lemmon Survey	·	1.2 km	MPC · JPL
355987	2009 AC_{50}	—	January 3, 2009	Mount Lemmon	Mount Lemmon Survey	·	2.3 km	MPC · JPL
355988	2009 AJ_{50}	—	January 3, 2009	Kitt Peak	Spacewatch	·	1.0 km	MPC · JPL
355989	2009 BX_{4}	—	October 26, 2008	Mount Lemmon	Mount Lemmon Survey	·	1.7 km	MPC · JPL
355990	2009 BG_{7}	—	September 14, 2007	Mount Lemmon	Mount Lemmon Survey	·	1.9 km	MPC · JPL
355991	2009 BX_{7}	—	January 21, 2009	Mayhill	Lowe, A.	·	1.9 km	MPC · JPL
355992	2009 BW_{10}	—	January 25, 2009	Mayhill	Lowe, A.	·	1.7 km	MPC · JPL
355993	2009 BW_{11}	—	January 20, 2009	Socorro	LINEAR	·	1.6 km	MPC · JPL
355994	2009 BL_{14}	—	January 29, 2009	Mayhill	Lowe, A.	·	1.4 km	MPC · JPL
355995	2009 BL_{17}	—	January 17, 2009	Mount Lemmon	Mount Lemmon Survey	NYS	1.2 km	MPC · JPL
355996	2009 BE_{25}	—	January 13, 2005	Kitt Peak	Spacewatch	·	1.0 km	MPC · JPL
355997	2009 BQ_{26}	—	January 16, 2009	Kitt Peak	Spacewatch	·	1.6 km	MPC · JPL
355998	2009 BS_{50}	—	January 16, 2009	Mount Lemmon	Mount Lemmon Survey	MAS	870 m	MPC · JPL
355999	2009 BA_{51}	—	January 16, 2009	Mount Lemmon	Mount Lemmon Survey	NYS	1.3 km	MPC · JPL
356000	2009 BO_{55}	—	December 30, 2008	Mount Lemmon	Mount Lemmon Survey	·	1.2 km	MPC · JPL

back to top

== See also ==
- Meanings of minor-planet names: 355001–356000
