= Meanings of minor-planet names: 355001–356000 =

As minor planet discoveries are confirmed, they are given a permanent number by the IAU's Minor Planet Center (MPC), and the discoverers can then submit names for them, following the IAU's naming conventions. The list below concerns those minor planets in the specified number-range that have received names, and explains the meanings of those names.

Official naming citations of newly named small Solar System bodies are approved and published in a bulletin by IAU's Working Group for Small Bodies Nomenclature (WGSBN). Before May 2021, citations were published in MPC's Minor Planet Circulars for many decades. Recent citations can also be found on the JPL Small-Body Database (SBDB). Until his death in 2016, German astronomer Lutz D. Schmadel compiled these citations into the Dictionary of Minor Planet Names (DMP) and regularly updated the collection.

Based on Paul Herget's The Names of the Minor Planets, Schmadel also researched the unclear origin of numerous asteroids, most of which had been named prior to World War II. This article incorporates text from this source, which is in the public domain: SBDB New namings may only be added to this list below after official publication as the preannouncement of names is condemned. The WGSBN publishes a comprehensive guideline for the naming rules of non-cometary small Solar System bodies.

== 355001–355100 ==
Named minor planet	Provisional	This minor planet was named for...	Ref · Catalog
355022 Triman	2006 QW_{142}	"Triman" is the competition nickname of Martin Peer (born 1984). He is an electronics engineer passionate about triathlons. He is also curious about unusual activity in the sky during his late-night workouts.	JPL · 355022
355029 Herve	2006 RH	Jacquinot Herve (born 1953), a very enthusiastic French amateur astronomer.	JPL · 355029

== 355101–355200 ==
back to top

Named minor planet	Provisional	This minor planet was named for...	Ref · Catalog
There are no named minor planets in this number range

== 355201–355300 ==
back to top

Named minor planet	Provisional	This minor planet was named for...	Ref · Catalog
355256 Margarethekahn	2007 KN_{4}	Margarethe Kahn, German mathematician.	IAU · 355256
355276 Leclair	2007 RF_{17}	Jean-Marie Leclair (1697–1764), was a Baroque violinist and composer. He is considered to have founded the French violin school.	IAU · 355276

== 355301–355400 ==
back to top

Named minor planet	Provisional	This minor planet was named for...	Ref · Catalog
There are no named minor planets in this number range

== 355401–355500 ==
back to top

Named minor planet	Provisional	This minor planet was named for...	Ref · Catalog
There are no named minor planets in this number range

== 355501–355600 ==
back to top

Named minor planet	Provisional	This minor planet was named for...	Ref · Catalog
There are no named minor planets in this number range

== 355601–355700 ==
back to top

Named minor planet	Provisional	This minor planet was named for...	Ref · Catalog
355657 Poppy	2008 EA_{89}	Frances “Poppy” Northcutt (b. 1943), an American engineer and attorney.	IAU · 355657

== 355701–355800 ==
back to top

Named minor planet	Provisional	This minor planet was named for...	Ref · Catalog
355704 Wangyinglai	2008 FW_{75}	Wang Yinglai (1907–2001), an academician of Chinese Academy of Sciences, is a founder of biochemical research in China. He was the first to organize and complete the biosynthesis of bovine insulin and yeast alanine transfer ribonucleic acid in the world.	IAU · 355704

== 355801–355900 ==
back to top

Named minor planet	Provisional	This minor planet was named for...	Ref · Catalog
There are no named minor planets in this number range

== 355901–356000 ==
back to top

Named minor planet	Provisional	This minor planet was named for...	Ref · Catalog
There are no named minor planets in this number range

back to top

Preceded by 354,001–355,000	Meanings of minor-planet names List of minor planets: 355,001–356,000	Succeeded by 356,001–357,000
