= List of minor planets: 353001–354000 =

The following is a partial list of minor planets, running from minor-planet number 353001 through 354000, inclusive. The primary data for this and other partial lists is based on JPL's "Small-Body Orbital Elements" and data available from the Minor Planet Center. Critical list information is also provided by the MPC, unless otherwise specified from Lowell Observatory. A detailed description of the table's columns and additional sources are given on the main page including a complete list of every page in this series, and a statistical break-up on the dynamical classification of minor planets.

Also see the summary list of all named bodies in numerical and alphabetical order, and the corresponding naming citations for the number range of this particular list. New namings may only be added to this list after official publication, as the preannouncement of names is condemned by the Working Group for Small Bodies Nomenclature of the International Astronomical Union.

Near-Earth obj.	MBA (inner)	MBA (outer)	Centaur
Mars-crosser	MBA (middle)	Jupiter trojan	Trans-Neptunian obj.
Unclassified

== 353001–353100 ==
Designation			Discovery			Properties		Ref
Permanent	Provisional	Named after	Date	Site	Discoverer(s)	Category	Diam.	Ref
353001	2009 BX_{125}	—	January 29, 2009	Kitt Peak	Spacewatch	·	2.1 km	MPC · JPL
353002	2009 BC_{127}	—	January 29, 2009	Kitt Peak	Spacewatch	·	940 m	MPC · JPL
353003	2009 BK_{129}	—	January 30, 2009	Mount Lemmon	Mount Lemmon Survey	·	1.2 km	MPC · JPL
353004	2009 BH_{141}	—	January 30, 2009	Kitt Peak	Spacewatch	·	1.5 km	MPC · JPL
353005	2009 BQ_{143}	—	January 30, 2009	Kitt Peak	Spacewatch	·	2.5 km	MPC · JPL
353006	2009 BQ_{145}	—	March 17, 2005	Mount Lemmon	Mount Lemmon Survey	·	2.2 km	MPC · JPL
353007	2009 BE_{149}	—	January 31, 2009	Kitt Peak	Spacewatch	HOF	3.4 km	MPC · JPL
353008	2009 BV_{150}	—	January 28, 2009	Catalina	CSS	·	1.1 km	MPC · JPL
353009	2009 BJ_{152}	—	January 28, 2009	Catalina	CSS	·	1.2 km	MPC · JPL
353010	2009 BH_{156}	—	January 31, 2009	Kitt Peak	Spacewatch	NEM	2.0 km	MPC · JPL
353011	2009 BY_{156}	—	January 31, 2009	Kitt Peak	Spacewatch	·	1.4 km	MPC · JPL
353012	2009 BP_{161}	—	January 31, 2009	Purple Mountain	PMO NEO Survey Program	DOR	3.0 km	MPC · JPL
353013	2009 BD_{163}	—	January 31, 2009	Kitt Peak	Spacewatch	(5)	1.4 km	MPC · JPL
353014	2009 BF_{166}	—	January 31, 2009	Kitt Peak	Spacewatch	·	1.3 km	MPC · JPL
353015	2009 BM_{167}	—	January 29, 2009	Catalina	CSS	·	1.5 km	MPC · JPL
353016	2009 BX_{169}	—	January 18, 2009	Kitt Peak	Spacewatch	·	2.2 km	MPC · JPL
353017	2009 BE_{170}	—	January 17, 2009	Kitt Peak	Spacewatch	·	1.5 km	MPC · JPL
353018	2009 BX_{170}	—	January 16, 2009	Kitt Peak	Spacewatch	·	2.6 km	MPC · JPL
353019	2009 BU_{173}	—	January 20, 2009	Kitt Peak	Spacewatch	·	1.1 km	MPC · JPL
353020	2009 BN_{174}	—	January 25, 2009	Kitt Peak	Spacewatch	·	1.6 km	MPC · JPL
353021	2009 BK_{175}	—	October 6, 2008	Mount Lemmon	Mount Lemmon Survey	·	2.1 km	MPC · JPL
353022	2009 BF_{178}	—	January 31, 2009	Kitt Peak	Spacewatch	·	2.4 km	MPC · JPL
353023	2009 BY_{180}	—	January 28, 2009	Catalina	CSS	·	3.6 km	MPC · JPL
353024	2009 BW_{182}	—	January 20, 2009	Mount Lemmon	Mount Lemmon Survey	·	1.4 km	MPC · JPL
353025	2009 BV_{186}	—	January 25, 2009	Socorro	LINEAR	·	1.6 km	MPC · JPL
353026	2009 BJ_{188}	—	January 19, 2009	Catalina	CSS	·	1.7 km	MPC · JPL
353027	2009 CX_{7}	—	February 1, 2009	Mount Lemmon	Mount Lemmon Survey	·	1.9 km	MPC · JPL
353028	2009 CV_{15}	—	February 3, 2009	Kitt Peak	Spacewatch	·	1.2 km	MPC · JPL
353029	2009 CH_{17}	—	February 2, 2009	Kitt Peak	Spacewatch	·	2.4 km	MPC · JPL
353030	2009 CJ_{21}	—	February 1, 2009	Kitt Peak	Spacewatch	·	1.3 km	MPC · JPL
353031	2009 CX_{22}	—	February 1, 2009	Kitt Peak	Spacewatch	·	1.0 km	MPC · JPL
353032	2009 CL_{25}	—	February 1, 2009	Kitt Peak	Spacewatch	·	1.5 km	MPC · JPL
353033	2009 CX_{27}	—	February 1, 2009	Kitt Peak	Spacewatch	·	1.4 km	MPC · JPL
353034	2009 CZ_{29}	—	February 1, 2009	Kitt Peak	Spacewatch	·	1.9 km	MPC · JPL
353035	2009 CG_{32}	—	February 1, 2009	Kitt Peak	Spacewatch	·	2.1 km	MPC · JPL
353036	2009 CQ_{34}	—	January 17, 2009	Kitt Peak	Spacewatch	·	1.2 km	MPC · JPL
353037	2009 CY_{40}	—	February 13, 2009	Kitt Peak	Spacewatch	·	990 m	MPC · JPL
353038	2009 CW_{43}	—	February 14, 2009	Mount Lemmon	Mount Lemmon Survey	(5)	1.1 km	MPC · JPL
353039	2009 CM_{46}	—	February 14, 2009	Kitt Peak	Spacewatch	·	1 km	MPC · JPL
353040	2009 CO_{47}	—	February 14, 2009	Kitt Peak	Spacewatch	·	1.9 km	MPC · JPL
353041	2009 CO_{51}	—	February 14, 2009	La Sagra	OAM	·	1.5 km	MPC · JPL
353042	2009 CP_{53}	—	February 14, 2009	La Sagra	OAM	·	1.5 km	MPC · JPL
353043	2009 CG_{59}	—	February 5, 2009	Kitt Peak	Spacewatch	·	1.2 km	MPC · JPL
353044	2009 DU_{1}	—	September 14, 2003	Palomar	NEAT	·	1.8 km	MPC · JPL
353045	2009 DT_{9}	—	February 18, 2009	Socorro	LINEAR	·	3.2 km	MPC · JPL
353046	2009 DZ_{14}	—	February 20, 2009	Calvin-Rehoboth	Calvin College	·	2.3 km	MPC · JPL
353047	2009 DP_{25}	—	February 21, 2009	Mount Lemmon	Mount Lemmon Survey	·	2.2 km	MPC · JPL
353048	2009 DG_{26}	—	February 17, 2009	Socorro	LINEAR	·	1.2 km	MPC · JPL
353049	2009 DN_{28}	—	February 1, 2009	Kitt Peak	Spacewatch	·	3.1 km	MPC · JPL
353050	2009 DZ_{35}	—	February 20, 2009	Kitt Peak	Spacewatch	·	3.1 km	MPC · JPL
353051	2009 DA_{42}	—	February 19, 2009	La Sagra	OAM	·	1.9 km	MPC · JPL
353052	2009 DN_{42}	—	February 18, 2009	La Sagra	OAM	·	1.1 km	MPC · JPL
353053	2009 DT_{45}	—	September 5, 2002	Socorro	LINEAR	·	2.4 km	MPC · JPL
353054	2009 DJ_{49}	—	February 19, 2009	Kitt Peak	Spacewatch	·	1.8 km	MPC · JPL
353055	2009 DU_{50}	—	February 19, 2009	Kitt Peak	Spacewatch	·	2.7 km	MPC · JPL
353056	2009 DK_{52}	—	February 22, 2009	Kitt Peak	Spacewatch	·	1.8 km	MPC · JPL
353057	2009 DC_{54}	—	February 22, 2009	Kitt Peak	Spacewatch	·	1.2 km	MPC · JPL
353058	2009 DM_{56}	—	February 22, 2009	Kitt Peak	Spacewatch	·	1.8 km	MPC · JPL
353059	2009 DV_{58}	—	February 22, 2009	Kitt Peak	Spacewatch	·	2.0 km	MPC · JPL
353060	2009 DB_{64}	—	February 22, 2009	Kitt Peak	Spacewatch	·	2.7 km	MPC · JPL
353061	2009 DM_{65}	—	February 22, 2009	Kitt Peak	Spacewatch	·	3.4 km	MPC · JPL
353062	2009 DZ_{66}	—	February 24, 2009	Mount Lemmon	Mount Lemmon Survey	·	1.2 km	MPC · JPL
353063	2009 DJ_{69}	—	February 26, 2009	Catalina	CSS	·	1.9 km	MPC · JPL
353064	2009 DO_{71}	—	February 19, 2009	La Sagra	OAM	ADE	3.1 km	MPC · JPL
353065	2009 DZ_{75}	—	February 21, 2009	Mount Lemmon	Mount Lemmon Survey	·	1.1 km	MPC · JPL
353066	2009 DG_{77}	—	February 22, 2009	La Sagra	OAM	·	1.8 km	MPC · JPL
353067	2009 DU_{78}	—	February 21, 2009	Kitt Peak	Spacewatch	(5)	1.3 km	MPC · JPL
353068	2009 DY_{78}	—	February 21, 2009	Kitt Peak	Spacewatch	·	1.6 km	MPC · JPL
353069	2009 DJ_{82}	—	February 24, 2009	Kitt Peak	Spacewatch	·	1.8 km	MPC · JPL
353070	2009 DJ_{83}	—	February 24, 2009	Kitt Peak	Spacewatch	·	2.0 km	MPC · JPL
353071	2009 DP_{83}	—	February 24, 2009	Kitt Peak	Spacewatch	·	1.6 km	MPC · JPL
353072	2009 DZ_{86}	—	February 27, 2009	Kitt Peak	Spacewatch	·	1.9 km	MPC · JPL
353073	2009 DE_{88}	—	February 27, 2009	Kitt Peak	Spacewatch	·	1.5 km	MPC · JPL
353074	2009 DA_{92}	—	February 27, 2009	Kitt Peak	Spacewatch	·	2.6 km	MPC · JPL
353075	2009 DO_{94}	—	February 28, 2009	Mount Lemmon	Mount Lemmon Survey	fast	2.4 km	MPC · JPL
353076	2009 DG_{95}	—	February 28, 2009	Kitt Peak	Spacewatch	·	2.7 km	MPC · JPL
353077	2009 DH_{95}	—	February 28, 2009	Hibiscus	Teamo, N.	·	1.5 km	MPC · JPL
353078	2009 DV_{98}	—	February 26, 2009	Kitt Peak	Spacewatch	·	2.1 km	MPC · JPL
353079	2009 DD_{104}	—	February 26, 2009	Kitt Peak	Spacewatch	MIS	2.9 km	MPC · JPL
353080	2009 DE_{104}	—	February 26, 2009	Kitt Peak	Spacewatch	·	2.2 km	MPC · JPL
353081	2009 DN_{105}	—	February 26, 2009	Kitt Peak	Spacewatch	·	1.9 km	MPC · JPL
353082	2009 DU_{105}	—	February 26, 2009	Kitt Peak	Spacewatch	·	1.7 km	MPC · JPL
353083	2009 DG_{106}	—	February 27, 2009	Catalina	CSS	(5)	1.3 km	MPC · JPL
353084	2009 DK_{111}	—	February 24, 2009	Catalina	CSS	HNS	1.4 km	MPC · JPL
353085	2009 DO_{112}	—	February 26, 2009	Catalina	CSS	·	1.9 km	MPC · JPL
353086	2009 DV_{114}	—	February 26, 2009	Mount Lemmon	Mount Lemmon Survey	·	2.0 km	MPC · JPL
353087	2009 DB_{115}	—	February 26, 2009	Catalina	CSS	·	950 m	MPC · JPL
353088	2009 DF_{118}	—	February 27, 2009	Kitt Peak	Spacewatch	·	1.8 km	MPC · JPL
353089	2009 DV_{120}	—	February 27, 2009	Kitt Peak	Spacewatch	·	1.6 km	MPC · JPL
353090	2009 DR_{134}	—	February 28, 2009	Kitt Peak	Spacewatch	·	1.8 km	MPC · JPL
353091	2009 DB_{137}	—	February 28, 2009	Kitt Peak	Spacewatch	·	1.9 km	MPC · JPL
353092	2009 DP_{139}	—	February 25, 2009	Siding Spring	SSS	·	2.6 km	MPC · JPL
353093	2009 DA_{141}	—	February 27, 2009	Catalina	CSS	·	1.8 km	MPC · JPL
353094	2009 DC_{141}	—	February 19, 2009	Kitt Peak	Spacewatch	·	2.7 km	MPC · JPL
353095	2009 DE_{141}	—	February 19, 2009	Kitt Peak	Spacewatch	KOR	1.3 km	MPC · JPL
353096	2009 ED_{12}	—	March 2, 2009	Kitt Peak	Spacewatch	·	2.4 km	MPC · JPL
353097	2009 EP_{14}	—	March 15, 2009	Kitt Peak	Spacewatch	·	1.6 km	MPC · JPL
353098	2009 EX_{14}	—	March 15, 2009	Kitt Peak	Spacewatch	(5)	1.1 km	MPC · JPL
353099	2009 EM_{16}	—	March 15, 2009	Kitt Peak	Spacewatch	DOR	2.4 km	MPC · JPL
353100	2009 EF_{17}	—	March 15, 2009	Kitt Peak	Spacewatch	·	2.0 km	MPC · JPL

== 353101–353200 ==
back to top

Designation			Discovery			Properties		Ref
Permanent	Provisional	Named after	Date	Site	Discoverer(s)	Category	Diam.	Ref
353101	2009 ET_{18}	—	March 15, 2009	Kitt Peak	Spacewatch	NEM	2.6 km	MPC · JPL
353102	2009 EZ_{19}	—	March 15, 2009	Catalina	CSS	·	1.4 km	MPC · JPL
353103	2009 EK_{22}	—	October 25, 2001	Apache Point	SDSS	·	1.8 km	MPC · JPL
353104	2009 ET_{22}	—	March 3, 2009	Kitt Peak	Spacewatch	·	2.6 km	MPC · JPL
353105	2009 EG_{24}	—	March 1, 2009	Kitt Peak	Spacewatch	THM	3.4 km	MPC · JPL
353106	2009 EM_{26}	—	March 15, 2009	Charleston	Astronomical Research Observatory	·	2.2 km	MPC · JPL
353107	2009 EP_{28}	—	March 3, 2009	Catalina	CSS	EOS	3.1 km	MPC · JPL
353108	2009 FV_{1}	—	March 17, 2009	Bisei SG Center	BATTeRS	·	2.2 km	MPC · JPL
353109	2009 FV_{2}	—	March 18, 2009	Dauban	Kugel, F.	·	3.0 km	MPC · JPL
353110	2009 FA_{3}	—	February 16, 2004	Kitt Peak	Spacewatch	·	2.6 km	MPC · JPL
353111	2009 FR_{7}	—	February 24, 2009	Kitt Peak	Spacewatch	·	2.7 km	MPC · JPL
353112	2009 FO_{8}	—	March 16, 2009	Kitt Peak	Spacewatch	·	1.3 km	MPC · JPL
353113	2009 FV_{13}	—	March 16, 2009	Dauban	Kugel, F.	·	1.5 km	MPC · JPL
353114	2009 FR_{14}	—	March 20, 2009	Vicques	M. Ory	·	5.9 km	MPC · JPL
353115	2009 FW_{15}	—	March 17, 2009	Kitt Peak	Spacewatch	·	1.9 km	MPC · JPL
353116	2009 FL_{19}	—	March 21, 2009	Vicques	M. Ory	·	2.8 km	MPC · JPL
353117	2009 FE_{24}	—	March 20, 2009	La Sagra	OAM	·	2.8 km	MPC · JPL
353118	2009 FJ_{24}	—	March 20, 2009	La Sagra	OAM	·	2.6 km	MPC · JPL
353119	2009 FJ_{26}	—	March 1, 2009	Kitt Peak	Spacewatch	KOR	1.9 km	MPC · JPL
353120	2009 FC_{37}	—	March 24, 2009	Mount Lemmon	Mount Lemmon Survey	·	2.2 km	MPC · JPL
353121	2009 FO_{37}	—	March 24, 2009	Mount Lemmon	Mount Lemmon Survey	·	1.9 km	MPC · JPL
353122	2009 FF_{50}	—	March 28, 2009	Catalina	CSS	·	2.0 km	MPC · JPL
353123	2009 FW_{50}	—	March 28, 2009	Kitt Peak	Spacewatch	AGN	1.5 km	MPC · JPL
353124	2009 FZ_{50}	—	March 28, 2009	Kitt Peak	Spacewatch	526	2.9 km	MPC · JPL
353125	2009 FK_{51}	—	March 28, 2009	Mount Lemmon	Mount Lemmon Survey	·	1.6 km	MPC · JPL
353126	2009 FA_{58}	—	February 19, 2009	Kitt Peak	Spacewatch	AGN	1.2 km	MPC · JPL
353127	2009 FR_{58}	—	March 21, 2009	Mount Lemmon	Mount Lemmon Survey	·	2.0 km	MPC · JPL
353128	2009 FZ_{58}	—	March 22, 2009	Mount Lemmon	Mount Lemmon Survey	·	2.1 km	MPC · JPL
353129	2009 FS_{59}	—	March 28, 2009	Catalina	CSS	·	2.7 km	MPC · JPL
353130	2009 FU_{59}	—	March 29, 2009	Catalina	CSS	(194)	2.2 km	MPC · JPL
353131	2009 FX_{61}	—	March 19, 2009	Kitt Peak	Spacewatch	·	2.3 km	MPC · JPL
353132	2009 FS_{67}	—	March 21, 2009	Kitt Peak	Spacewatch	·	2.6 km	MPC · JPL
353133	2009 FZ_{67}	—	March 31, 2009	Kitt Peak	Spacewatch	HOF	2.7 km	MPC · JPL
353134	2009 FP_{71}	—	March 31, 2009	Catalina	CSS	EOS	2.5 km	MPC · JPL
353135	2009 FR_{71}	—	March 23, 2009	Mount Lemmon	Mount Lemmon Survey	·	1.8 km	MPC · JPL
353136	2009 FW_{75}	—	March 23, 2009	Kitt Peak	Spacewatch	·	1.1 km	MPC · JPL
353137	2009 GU_{1}	—	April 12, 2009	Altschwendt	W. Ries	·	1.3 km	MPC · JPL
353138	2009 GX_{4}	—	April 15, 2009	Siding Spring	SSS	·	4.1 km	MPC · JPL
353139	2009 HG_{4}	—	April 17, 2009	Kitt Peak	Spacewatch	·	2.3 km	MPC · JPL
353140	2009 HE_{5}	—	April 17, 2009	Kitt Peak	Spacewatch	AGN	1.3 km	MPC · JPL
353141	2009 HK_{8}	—	April 17, 2009	Kitt Peak	Spacewatch	·	2.4 km	MPC · JPL
353142	2009 HR_{8}	—	April 17, 2009	Kitt Peak	Spacewatch	·	1.8 km	MPC · JPL
353143	2009 HT_{11}	—	April 19, 2009	Kitt Peak	Spacewatch	·	2.8 km	MPC · JPL
353144	2009 HV_{12}	—	April 16, 2009	Catalina	CSS	·	2.1 km	MPC · JPL
353145	2009 HJ_{16}	—	April 18, 2009	Kitt Peak	Spacewatch	·	1.7 km	MPC · JPL
353146	2009 HS_{16}	—	April 18, 2009	Kitt Peak	Spacewatch	KOR	1.4 km	MPC · JPL
353147	2009 HT_{26}	—	January 11, 2008	Mount Lemmon	Mount Lemmon Survey	·	1.9 km	MPC · JPL
353148	2009 HU_{28}	—	April 18, 2009	Catalina	CSS	·	1.8 km	MPC · JPL
353149	2009 HS_{34}	—	April 20, 2009	Kitt Peak	Spacewatch	·	3.4 km	MPC · JPL
353150	2009 HH_{39}	—	April 18, 2009	Kitt Peak	Spacewatch	EOS	2.0 km	MPC · JPL
353151	2009 HY_{41}	—	April 20, 2009	Kitt Peak	Spacewatch	·	2.8 km	MPC · JPL
353152	2009 HM_{42}	—	April 20, 2009	Kitt Peak	Spacewatch	EOS	2.4 km	MPC · JPL
353153	2009 HN_{48}	—	April 19, 2009	Kitt Peak	Spacewatch	·	3.9 km	MPC · JPL
353154	2009 HT_{48}	—	April 19, 2009	Catalina	CSS	GEF	1.5 km	MPC · JPL
353155	2009 HN_{63}	—	April 22, 2009	Mount Lemmon	Mount Lemmon Survey	THM	2.6 km	MPC · JPL
353156	2009 HK_{64}	—	April 22, 2009	Kitt Peak	Spacewatch	·	4.6 km	MPC · JPL
353157	2009 HG_{65}	—	April 23, 2009	Kitt Peak	Spacewatch	·	4.5 km	MPC · JPL
353158	2009 HY_{65}	—	April 23, 2009	Kitt Peak	Spacewatch	·	4.7 km	MPC · JPL
353159	2009 HE_{70}	—	October 2, 2006	Mount Lemmon	Mount Lemmon Survey	EOS	1.9 km	MPC · JPL
353160	2009 HW_{73}	—	April 19, 2009	Catalina	CSS	·	3.9 km	MPC · JPL
353161	2009 HX_{84}	—	April 27, 2009	Purple Mountain	PMO NEO Survey Program	·	2.7 km	MPC · JPL
353162	2009 HT_{89}	—	April 29, 2009	Kitt Peak	Spacewatch	·	5.3 km	MPC · JPL
353163	2009 HR_{100}	—	April 30, 2009	Kitt Peak	Spacewatch	·	3.5 km	MPC · JPL
353164	2009 HE_{104}	—	April 21, 2009	Kitt Peak	Spacewatch	·	2.0 km	MPC · JPL
353165	2009 HQ_{106}	—	May 3, 2005	Kitt Peak	Spacewatch	(5)	1.5 km	MPC · JPL
353166	2009 JP_{6}	—	May 13, 2009	Kitt Peak	Spacewatch	VER	4.2 km	MPC · JPL
353167	2009 JU_{17}	—	May 2, 2009	Mount Lemmon	Mount Lemmon Survey	EOS	2.3 km	MPC · JPL
353168	2009 KR_{3}	—	May 17, 2009	Kitt Peak	Spacewatch	·	2.7 km	MPC · JPL
353169	2009 KE_{4}	—	May 24, 2009	Catalina	CSS	·	4.2 km	MPC · JPL
353170	2009 KH_{6}	—	October 19, 2006	Mount Lemmon	Mount Lemmon Survey	·	2.1 km	MPC · JPL
353171 Cosmebauçà	2009 LU	Cosmebauçà	June 11, 2009	La Sagra	OAM	·	3.1 km	MPC · JPL
353172	2009 LG_{3}	—	June 12, 2009	Kitt Peak	Spacewatch	·	3.6 km	MPC · JPL
353173	2009 LZ_{4}	—	June 14, 2009	Kitt Peak	Spacewatch	·	3.0 km	MPC · JPL
353174	2009 MQ_{1}	—	May 16, 2009	Kitt Peak	Spacewatch	·	4.4 km	MPC · JPL
353175	2009 ML_{3}	—	June 19, 2009	Kitt Peak	Spacewatch	·	4.0 km	MPC · JPL
353176	2009 MA_{7}	—	June 23, 2009	Dauban	Kugel, F.	THB	3.3 km	MPC · JPL
353177	2009 OF_{21}	—	July 29, 2009	La Sagra	OAM	THB	4.4 km	MPC · JPL
353178	2009 QK_{59}	—	August 28, 2009	Kitt Peak	Spacewatch	L4	8.0 km	MPC · JPL
353179	2009 RA_{12}	—	September 12, 2009	Kitt Peak	Spacewatch	L4	9.2 km	MPC · JPL
353180	2009 RG_{14}	—	September 12, 2009	Kitt Peak	Spacewatch	L4 · ERY	8.7 km	MPC · JPL
353181	2009 RW_{31}	—	February 14, 2002	Kitt Peak	Spacewatch	L4	9.0 km	MPC · JPL
353182	2009 RR_{63}	—	September 15, 2009	Kitt Peak	Spacewatch	L4	9.8 km	MPC · JPL
353183	2009 RF_{64}	—	September 15, 2009	Kitt Peak	Spacewatch	L4	7.9 km	MPC · JPL
353184	2009 RQ_{64}	—	September 15, 2009	Kitt Peak	Spacewatch	L4	8.1 km	MPC · JPL
353185	2009 RT_{64}	—	September 15, 2009	Kitt Peak	Spacewatch	L4	10 km	MPC · JPL
353186	2009 RR_{67}	—	September 4, 2008	Kitt Peak	Spacewatch	L4	7.8 km	MPC · JPL
353187	2009 RK_{68}	—	September 20, 2008	Mount Lemmon	Mount Lemmon Survey	L4	7.3 km	MPC · JPL
353188	2009 RR_{68}	—	September 15, 2009	Kitt Peak	Spacewatch	L4 · ERY	9.1 km	MPC · JPL
353189 Iasus	2009 RQ_{76}	Iasus	October 25, 2012	Mount Lemmon	Mount Lemmon Survey	L4	10 km	MPC · JPL
353190	2009 ST	—	September 16, 2009	Mount Lemmon	Mount Lemmon Survey	AMO	380 m	MPC · JPL
353191	2009 SJ_{48}	—	September 16, 2009	Kitt Peak	Spacewatch	L4	8.3 km	MPC · JPL
353192	2009 ST_{50}	—	September 17, 2009	Kitt Peak	Spacewatch	L4	9.7 km	MPC · JPL
353193	2009 SH_{58}	—	February 13, 2002	Apache Point	SDSS	L4 · (8060)	8.2 km	MPC · JPL
353194 Meilutytė	2009 SM_{100}	Meilutytė	September 17, 2009	Moletai	K. Černis, Zdanavicius, J.	L4	10 km	MPC · JPL
353195	2009 SP_{119}	—	February 13, 2002	Apache Point	SDSS	L4	7.2 km	MPC · JPL
353196	2009 SF_{156}	—	September 4, 2008	Kitt Peak	Spacewatch	L4	7.4 km	MPC · JPL
353197	2009 SW_{185}	—	September 21, 2009	Kitt Peak	Spacewatch	L4	7.8 km	MPC · JPL
353198	2009 SB_{200}	—	September 7, 2008	Mount Lemmon	Mount Lemmon Survey	L4	8.5 km	MPC · JPL
353199	2009 SU_{211}	—	September 23, 2009	Mount Lemmon	Mount Lemmon Survey	L4	8.6 km	MPC · JPL
353200	2009 SA_{246}	—	September 17, 2009	Kitt Peak	Spacewatch	L4	10 km	MPC · JPL

== 353201–353300 ==
back to top

Designation			Discovery			Properties		Ref
Permanent	Provisional	Named after	Date	Site	Discoverer(s)	Category	Diam.	Ref
353201	2009 SP_{246}	—	September 17, 2009	Kitt Peak	Spacewatch	L4	10 km	MPC · JPL
353202	2009 SB_{254}	—	September 26, 2009	Kitt Peak	Spacewatch	L4	10 km	MPC · JPL
353203	2009 SJ_{264}	—	September 23, 2009	Mount Lemmon	Mount Lemmon Survey	L4	10 km	MPC · JPL
353204	2009 SR_{281}	—	September 25, 2009	Kitt Peak	Spacewatch	L4	10 km	MPC · JPL
353205	2009 SN_{318}	—	September 20, 2009	Kitt Peak	Spacewatch	L4	8.4 km	MPC · JPL
353206	2009 SY_{326}	—	September 20, 2009	Catalina	CSS	H	590 m	MPC · JPL
353207	2009 SB_{330}	—	September 17, 2009	Mount Lemmon	Mount Lemmon Survey	H	600 m	MPC · JPL
353208	2009 SZ_{353}	—	September 17, 2009	Kitt Peak	Spacewatch	L4	9.4 km	MPC · JPL
353209	2009 SC_{354}	—	September 28, 2009	Mount Lemmon	Mount Lemmon Survey	L4	9.5 km	MPC · JPL
353210	2009 SO_{355}	—	September 18, 2009	Catalina	CSS	L4	10 km	MPC · JPL
353211	2009 SQ_{355}	—	September 20, 2009	Kitt Peak	Spacewatch	L4	9.3 km	MPC · JPL
353212	2009 SB_{356}	—	April 1, 2003	Kitt Peak	Deep Ecliptic Survey	L4	8.7 km	MPC · JPL
353213	2009 SY_{356}	—	September 18, 2009	Kitt Peak	Spacewatch	L4	7.2 km	MPC · JPL
353214	2009 TA_{3}	—	October 12, 2009	Socorro	LINEAR	H	780 m	MPC · JPL
353215	2009 TE_{12}	—	October 14, 2009	Catalina	CSS	L4	15 km	MPC · JPL
353216	2009 UQ_{16}	—	October 17, 2009	Catalina	CSS	·	5.7 km	MPC · JPL
353217	2009 UG_{60}	—	September 28, 2009	Kitt Peak	Spacewatch	L4	8.2 km	MPC · JPL
353218	2009 UN_{67}	—	October 17, 2009	Mount Lemmon	Mount Lemmon Survey	L4	16 km	MPC · JPL
353219	2009 UZ_{91}	—	October 27, 2009	Catalina	CSS	H	760 m	MPC · JPL
353220	2009 WM_{166}	—	November 21, 2009	Mount Lemmon	Mount Lemmon Survey	·	840 m	MPC · JPL
353221	2009 YV	—	November 16, 1998	Kitt Peak	Spacewatch	H	550 m	MPC · JPL
353222	2009 YD_{7}	—	December 16, 2009	La Silla	D. L. Rabinowitz	centaur	50 km	MPC · JPL
353223	2010 AT_{4}	—	September 3, 2004	Siding Spring	SSS	EUN	2.2 km	MPC · JPL
353224	2010 AP_{30}	—	January 5, 2010	Kitt Peak	Spacewatch	·	800 m	MPC · JPL
353225	2010 AO_{32}	—	January 6, 2010	Kitt Peak	Spacewatch	·	960 m	MPC · JPL
353226	2010 AF_{94}	—	July 18, 2007	Mount Lemmon	Mount Lemmon Survey	·	3.4 km	MPC · JPL
353227	2010 AP_{119}	—	October 1, 2009	Mount Lemmon	Mount Lemmon Survey	L4	13 km	MPC · JPL
353228	2010 AC_{121}	—	September 17, 2009	Mount Lemmon	Mount Lemmon Survey	L4	13 km	MPC · JPL
353229	2010 AA_{122}	—	January 14, 2010	WISE	WISE	PHO	2.7 km	MPC · JPL
353230	2010 BJ_{35}	—	September 3, 2008	Kitt Peak	Spacewatch	L4	8.9 km	MPC · JPL
353231	2010 BA_{68}	—	January 22, 2010	WISE	WISE	·	3.2 km	MPC · JPL
353232 Nolwenn	2010 CB_{12}	Nolwenn	February 6, 2010	Mayhill	Kurti, S.	·	2.9 km	MPC · JPL
353233	2010 CV_{40}	—	February 13, 2010	Kitt Peak	Spacewatch	·	840 m	MPC · JPL
353234	2010 CT_{44}	—	January 5, 2003	Kitt Peak	Spacewatch	·	890 m	MPC · JPL
353235	2010 CO_{47}	—	February 12, 2010	WISE	WISE	·	4.3 km	MPC · JPL
353236	2010 CL_{65}	—	February 9, 2010	Kitt Peak	Spacewatch	·	670 m	MPC · JPL
353237	2010 CQ_{93}	—	February 14, 2010	Kitt Peak	Spacewatch	·	710 m	MPC · JPL
353238	2010 CM_{94}	—	February 14, 2010	Kitt Peak	Spacewatch	·	500 m	MPC · JPL
353239	2010 CN_{107}	—	February 14, 2010	Kitt Peak	Spacewatch	·	990 m	MPC · JPL
353240	2010 CS_{107}	—	February 14, 2010	Kitt Peak	Spacewatch	·	1.4 km	MPC · JPL
353241	2010 CA_{108}	—	February 14, 2010	Kitt Peak	Spacewatch	NYS	830 m	MPC · JPL
353242	2010 CX_{120}	—	February 15, 2010	Catalina	CSS	·	910 m	MPC · JPL
353243	2010 CZ_{123}	—	February 15, 2010	Catalina	CSS	·	1.7 km	MPC · JPL
353244	2010 CF_{146}	—	February 15, 2010	Mount Lemmon	Mount Lemmon Survey	·	830 m	MPC · JPL
353245	2010 CX_{170}	—	February 13, 2010	Kitt Peak	Spacewatch	·	1.3 km	MPC · JPL
353246	2010 DX_{33}	—	February 20, 2010	WISE	WISE	·	2.3 km	MPC · JPL
353247	2010 DF_{54}	—	February 23, 2010	WISE	WISE	·	2.4 km	MPC · JPL
353248	2010 EV_{36}	—	March 12, 2010	Mount Lemmon	Mount Lemmon Survey	(5)	2.6 km	MPC · JPL
353249	2010 EP_{37}	—	January 12, 2010	Kitt Peak	Spacewatch	·	1.9 km	MPC · JPL
353250	2010 EX_{37}	—	March 12, 2010	Mount Lemmon	Mount Lemmon Survey	PHO	2.0 km	MPC · JPL
353251	2010 EZ_{37}	—	March 12, 2010	Mount Lemmon	Mount Lemmon Survey	·	1.8 km	MPC · JPL
353252	2010 EU_{39}	—	March 11, 2010	La Sagra	OAM	·	1.5 km	MPC · JPL
353253	2010 EQ_{42}	—	March 4, 2010	Catalina	CSS	·	2.7 km	MPC · JPL
353254	2010 EG_{69}	—	January 31, 2006	Kitt Peak	Spacewatch	NYS	1.2 km	MPC · JPL
353255	2010 ER_{69}	—	March 13, 2010	Catalina	CSS	·	1.4 km	MPC · JPL
353256	2010 EE_{78}	—	January 8, 2010	Mount Lemmon	Mount Lemmon Survey	·	2.6 km	MPC · JPL
353257	2010 EF_{81}	—	March 12, 2010	Mount Lemmon	Mount Lemmon Survey	(2076)	840 m	MPC · JPL
353258	2010 EJ_{83}	—	October 20, 2008	Mount Lemmon	Mount Lemmon Survey	NYS	1.6 km	MPC · JPL
353259	2010 EK_{86}	—	March 13, 2010	Kitt Peak	Spacewatch	·	880 m	MPC · JPL
353260	2010 EN_{105}	—	March 12, 2010	Mount Lemmon	Mount Lemmon Survey	·	940 m	MPC · JPL
353261	2010 EA_{107}	—	March 12, 2010	Kitt Peak	Spacewatch	·	2.4 km	MPC · JPL
353262	2010 ES_{107}	—	March 12, 2010	Kitt Peak	Spacewatch	·	1.2 km	MPC · JPL
353263	2010 EE_{109}	—	March 14, 2010	Kitt Peak	Spacewatch	·	1.6 km	MPC · JPL
353264	2010 EM_{111}	—	March 15, 2010	Kitt Peak	Spacewatch	·	640 m	MPC · JPL
353265	2010 EC_{112}	—	March 12, 2010	Kitt Peak	Spacewatch	·	1.4 km	MPC · JPL
353266	2010 EX_{112}	—	March 13, 2010	Kitt Peak	Spacewatch	·	800 m	MPC · JPL
353267	2010 EY_{112}	—	March 13, 2010	Kitt Peak	Spacewatch	·	1.2 km	MPC · JPL
353268	2010 ED_{126}	—	March 13, 2010	Catalina	CSS	·	1.3 km	MPC · JPL
353269	2010 EB_{127}	—	March 15, 2010	Catalina	CSS	·	1.4 km	MPC · JPL
353270	2010 EB_{135}	—	March 12, 2010	Kitt Peak	Spacewatch	V	550 m	MPC · JPL
353271	2010 ER_{135}	—	March 13, 2010	Kitt Peak	Spacewatch	NYS	1.3 km	MPC · JPL
353272	2010 EP_{142}	—	March 8, 2000	Kitt Peak	Spacewatch	·	710 m	MPC · JPL
353273	2010 FM_{24}	—	March 18, 2010	Kitt Peak	Spacewatch	·	1.2 km	MPC · JPL
353274	2010 FX_{27}	—	March 20, 2010	Catalina	CSS	·	930 m	MPC · JPL
353275	2010 FQ_{55}	—	March 25, 2010	Mount Lemmon	Mount Lemmon Survey	·	750 m	MPC · JPL
353276	2010 FL_{83}	—	March 19, 2010	Mount Lemmon	Mount Lemmon Survey	·	1.7 km	MPC · JPL
353277	2010 FP_{84}	—	March 15, 2010	Mount Lemmon	Mount Lemmon Survey	NYS	900 m	MPC · JPL
353278	2010 FS_{84}	—	March 26, 2010	Kitt Peak	Spacewatch	·	1.0 km	MPC · JPL
353279	2010 FO_{91}	—	January 26, 2006	Mount Lemmon	Mount Lemmon Survey	·	1.0 km	MPC · JPL
353280	2010 FY_{92}	—	March 21, 2010	Kitt Peak	Spacewatch	·	1.2 km	MPC · JPL
353281	2010 FN_{95}	—	March 25, 2010	Kitt Peak	Spacewatch	·	1.4 km	MPC · JPL
353282	2010 GZ_{27}	—	April 6, 2010	Mount Lemmon	Mount Lemmon Survey	·	880 m	MPC · JPL
353283	2010 GW_{30}	—	October 28, 2008	Kitt Peak	Spacewatch	·	800 m	MPC · JPL
353284	2010 GH_{31}	—	March 19, 2010	Mount Lemmon	Mount Lemmon Survey	·	2.1 km	MPC · JPL
353285	2010 GM_{35}	—	October 29, 2008	Kitt Peak	Spacewatch	·	1.4 km	MPC · JPL
353286	2010 GM_{75}	—	April 8, 2010	Črni Vrh	Skvarč, J.	·	1.7 km	MPC · JPL
353287	2010 GA_{78}	—	January 8, 2002	Haleakala	NEAT	·	5.4 km	MPC · JPL
353288	2010 GO_{97}	—	April 7, 2010	Kitt Peak	Spacewatch	·	2.7 km	MPC · JPL
353289	2010 GS_{106}	—	April 8, 2010	Kitt Peak	Spacewatch	NYS	1.3 km	MPC · JPL
353290	2010 GB_{123}	—	April 3, 2010	Kitt Peak	Spacewatch	·	1.9 km	MPC · JPL
353291	2010 GZ_{140}	—	April 8, 2010	Kitt Peak	Spacewatch	·	1.3 km	MPC · JPL
353292	2010 GQ_{145}	—	April 9, 2010	Mount Lemmon	Mount Lemmon Survey	·	750 m	MPC · JPL
353293	2010 GU_{145}	—	April 8, 2010	Catalina	CSS	·	1.1 km	MPC · JPL
353294	2010 GR_{154}	—	April 15, 2010	WISE	WISE	LIX	3.6 km	MPC · JPL
353295	2010 GO_{155}	—	April 15, 2010	WISE	WISE	·	3.3 km	MPC · JPL
353296	2010 GC_{157}	—	April 9, 2010	Kitt Peak	Spacewatch	·	1 km	MPC · JPL
353297	2010 HC_{21}	—	October 28, 2008	Catalina	CSS	·	1.6 km	MPC · JPL
353298	2010 HC_{46}	—	April 23, 2010	WISE	WISE	·	3.3 km	MPC · JPL
353299	2010 HF_{77}	—	April 17, 2010	Mount Lemmon	Mount Lemmon Survey	·	650 m	MPC · JPL
353300	2010 HN_{78}	—	April 20, 2010	Kitt Peak	Spacewatch	·	2.2 km	MPC · JPL

== 353301–353400 ==
back to top

Designation			Discovery			Properties		Ref
Permanent	Provisional	Named after	Date	Site	Discoverer(s)	Category	Diam.	Ref
353301	2010 HQ_{108}	—	February 21, 2006	Mount Lemmon	Mount Lemmon Survey	V	650 m	MPC · JPL
353302	2010 HY_{108}	—	April 26, 2010	Mount Lemmon	Mount Lemmon Survey	EUN	1.7 km	MPC · JPL
353303	2010 JV_{28}	—	May 3, 2010	Kitt Peak	Spacewatch	·	1.3 km	MPC · JPL
353304	2010 JZ_{31}	—	May 6, 2010	Mount Lemmon	Mount Lemmon Survey	·	1.7 km	MPC · JPL
353305	2010 JF_{34}	—	May 6, 2010	Mount Lemmon	Mount Lemmon Survey	ADE	3.3 km	MPC · JPL
353306	2010 JW_{58}	—	May 7, 2010	WISE	WISE	·	4.7 km	MPC · JPL
353307	2010 JZ_{76}	—	May 7, 2010	Mount Lemmon	Mount Lemmon Survey	·	2.6 km	MPC · JPL
353308	2010 JE_{77}	—	May 11, 2010	Mount Lemmon	Mount Lemmon Survey	·	1.6 km	MPC · JPL
353309	2010 JC_{79}	—	November 8, 2007	Mount Lemmon	Mount Lemmon Survey	·	2.5 km	MPC · JPL
353310	2010 JW_{114}	—	April 8, 2010	Catalina	CSS	·	1.7 km	MPC · JPL
353311	2010 JW_{125}	—	August 31, 2005	Palomar	NEAT	·	4.8 km	MPC · JPL
353312	2010 JV_{127}	—	May 13, 2010	WISE	WISE	·	4.1 km	MPC · JPL
353313	2010 JL_{152}	—	May 7, 2010	Mount Lemmon	Mount Lemmon Survey	·	1.9 km	MPC · JPL
353314	2010 JH_{161}	—	October 21, 2006	Mount Lemmon	Mount Lemmon Survey	TIR	3.2 km	MPC · JPL
353315	2010 KM_{8}	—	February 27, 2006	Kitt Peak	Spacewatch	MAS	710 m	MPC · JPL
353316	2010 KN_{17}	—	May 17, 2010	WISE	WISE	·	3.4 km	MPC · JPL
353317	2010 KY_{36}	—	May 20, 2010	Mount Lemmon	Mount Lemmon Survey	·	1.0 km	MPC · JPL
353318	2010 KE_{51}	—	May 22, 2010	WISE	WISE	·	4.4 km	MPC · JPL
353319	2010 KO_{94}	—	May 27, 2010	WISE	WISE	URS	3.3 km	MPC · JPL
353320	2010 LB	—	June 1, 2010	Nogales	P. R. Holvorcem, M. Schwartz	T_{j} (2.99)	4.7 km	MPC · JPL
353321	2010 LW_{8}	—	May 28, 2000	Socorro	LINEAR	·	770 m	MPC · JPL
353322	2010 LB_{10}	—	June 2, 2010	WISE	WISE	·	5.4 km	MPC · JPL
353323	2010 LH_{29}	—	June 6, 2010	WISE	WISE	PHO	1.3 km	MPC · JPL
353324	2010 LR_{34}	—	March 9, 2005	Catalina	CSS	HNS	1.6 km	MPC · JPL
353325	2010 LQ_{63}	—	June 6, 2010	Kitt Peak	Spacewatch	·	2.5 km	MPC · JPL
353326	2010 LR_{92}	—	March 23, 2003	Kitt Peak	Spacewatch	·	4.3 km	MPC · JPL
353327	2010 LB_{104}	—	June 15, 2010	Socorro	LINEAR	·	1.7 km	MPC · JPL
353328	2010 ME_{27}	—	June 19, 2010	WISE	WISE	·	4.3 km	MPC · JPL
353329	2010 MG_{44}	—	June 22, 2010	WISE	WISE	·	4.6 km	MPC · JPL
353330	2010 NT_{6}	—	July 5, 2010	Mount Lemmon	Mount Lemmon Survey	ADE	2.7 km	MPC · JPL
353331	2010 NK_{17}	—	February 28, 2008	Mount Lemmon	Mount Lemmon Survey	·	3.8 km	MPC · JPL
353332	2010 NX_{81}	—	November 19, 2007	Mount Lemmon	Mount Lemmon Survey	·	3.2 km	MPC · JPL
353333	2010 OT_{71}	—	July 25, 2010	WISE	WISE	·	3.4 km	MPC · JPL
353334	2010 OY_{83}	—	July 23, 2003	Palomar	NEAT	KON	3.7 km	MPC · JPL
353335	2010 PD_{12}	—	August 2, 2010	WISE	WISE	·	1.6 km	MPC · JPL
353336	2010 PG_{26}	—	August 10, 2010	Kitt Peak	Spacewatch	L4	7.8 km	MPC · JPL
353337	2010 PN_{42}	—	November 26, 2003	Kitt Peak	Spacewatch	3:2	7.4 km	MPC · JPL
353338	2010 RP_{16}	—	December 31, 2007	Mount Lemmon	Mount Lemmon Survey	·	2.4 km	MPC · JPL
353339	2010 RD_{69}	—	August 18, 2001	Palomar	NEAT	·	2.5 km	MPC · JPL
353340	2010 RL_{182}	—	September 8, 2004	Socorro	LINEAR	·	4.3 km	MPC · JPL
353341	2010 TC_{133}	—	February 10, 2007	Mount Lemmon	Mount Lemmon Survey	·	4.0 km	MPC · JPL
353342	2010 UJ_{77}	—	October 13, 2010	Mount Lemmon	Mount Lemmon Survey	L4	10 km	MPC · JPL
353343	2010 VD_{5}	—	October 2, 2010	Mount Lemmon	Mount Lemmon Survey	L4	10 km	MPC · JPL
353344	2010 VF_{21}	—	March 9, 2002	Kitt Peak	Spacewatch	L4	7.5 km	MPC · JPL
353345	2010 VM_{73}	—	November 15, 1995	Kitt Peak	Spacewatch	·	1.2 km	MPC · JPL
353346	2010 VV_{78}	—	September 28, 2009	Mount Lemmon	Mount Lemmon Survey	L4 · ERY	7.8 km	MPC · JPL
353347	2010 VB_{90}	—	September 19, 2009	Kitt Peak	Spacewatch	L4	9.3 km	MPC · JPL
353348	2010 VR_{100}	—	February 2, 2001	Kitt Peak	Spacewatch	L4	7.0 km	MPC · JPL
353349	2010 VT_{103}	—	September 9, 2007	Mauna Kea	D. D. Balam, K. M. Perrett	L4	8.7 km	MPC · JPL
353350	2010 VA_{116}	—	December 28, 2000	Kitt Peak	Spacewatch	L4 · ERY	9.1 km	MPC · JPL
353351	2010 VO_{138}	—	September 27, 2009	Mount Lemmon	Mount Lemmon Survey	L4 · (222861)	10 km	MPC · JPL
353352	2010 VK_{165}	—	September 25, 2009	Kitt Peak	Spacewatch	L4	7.8 km	MPC · JPL
353353	2010 VS_{173}	—	March 23, 2003	Kitt Peak	Spacewatch	L4	9.6 km	MPC · JPL
353354	2010 VC_{181}	—	September 6, 2008	Mount Lemmon	Mount Lemmon Survey	L4	8.7 km	MPC · JPL
353355	2010 VQ_{184}	—	September 7, 2008	Mount Lemmon	Mount Lemmon Survey	L4	7.5 km	MPC · JPL
353356	2010 VZ_{214}	—	September 18, 2009	Kitt Peak	Spacewatch	L4	7.6 km	MPC · JPL
353357	2010 WD_{2}	—	November 15, 1998	Kitt Peak	Spacewatch	L4	7.4 km	MPC · JPL
353358	2010 WG_{54}	—	September 28, 2008	Mount Lemmon	Mount Lemmon Survey	L4	8.7 km	MPC · JPL
353359	2010 WN_{60}	—	April 21, 2003	Kitt Peak	Spacewatch	L4	10 km	MPC · JPL
353360	2010 WY_{67}	—	August 24, 2008	Kitt Peak	Spacewatch	L4	8.7 km	MPC · JPL
353361	2010 XV_{24}	—	June 8, 2005	Kitt Peak	Spacewatch	L4	10 km	MPC · JPL
353362	2010 XS_{47}	—	October 8, 2010	Catalina	CSS	L4	9.8 km	MPC · JPL
353363	2010 XP_{50}	—	March 31, 2003	Anderson Mesa	LONEOS	L4	10 km	MPC · JPL
353364	2010 XC_{77}	—	November 17, 2009	Catalina	CSS	L4	14 km	MPC · JPL
353365	2011 FJ_{9}	—	September 27, 2008	Mount Lemmon	Mount Lemmon Survey	·	2.2 km	MPC · JPL
353366	2011 FH_{48}	—	September 13, 2005	Catalina	CSS	·	980 m	MPC · JPL
353367	2011 GG_{62}	—	April 30, 2006	Catalina	CSS	H	680 m	MPC · JPL
353368	2011 GT_{62}	—	April 5, 2003	Kitt Peak	Spacewatch	H	570 m	MPC · JPL
353369	2011 HK_{8}	—	September 18, 2009	Catalina	CSS	H	590 m	MPC · JPL
353370	2011 HO_{26}	—	June 25, 2003	Socorro	LINEAR	·	2.4 km	MPC · JPL
353371	2011 HL_{62}	—	May 28, 2003	Catalina	CSS	H	730 m	MPC · JPL
353372	2011 KG_{8}	—	July 14, 2001	Palomar	NEAT	·	810 m	MPC · JPL
353373	2011 KS_{16}	—	June 23, 2003	Socorro	LINEAR	·	2.2 km	MPC · JPL
353374	2011 KA_{20}	—	July 30, 2006	Siding Spring	SSS	H	710 m	MPC · JPL
353375	2011 KT_{47}	—	October 16, 1977	Palomar	C. J. van Houten, I. van Houten-Groeneveld, T. Gehrels	·	1.5 km	MPC · JPL
353376	2011 LD_{8}	—	July 6, 2003	Kitt Peak	Spacewatch	H	820 m	MPC · JPL
353377	2011 LE_{18}	—	June 20, 2006	Mount Lemmon	Mount Lemmon Survey	·	2.1 km	MPC · JPL
353378	2011 LG_{19}	—	June 13, 2010	Nogales	M. Schwartz, P. R. Holvorcem	·	3.7 km	MPC · JPL
353379	2011 LO_{28}	—	September 18, 1993	La Silla	E. W. Elst	·	1.7 km	MPC · JPL
353380	2011 MB	—	December 12, 2004	Socorro	LINEAR	H	640 m	MPC · JPL
353381	2011 MA_{1}	—	December 1, 2005	Kitt Peak	Spacewatch	·	740 m	MPC · JPL
353382	2011 MJ_{7}	—	July 17, 2002	Palomar	NEAT	GAL	2.1 km	MPC · JPL
353383	2011 MO_{7}	—	September 3, 1994	La Silla	E. W. Elst	MIS	2.4 km	MPC · JPL
353384	2011 MT_{8}	—	December 3, 2002	Palomar	NEAT	·	2.4 km	MPC · JPL
353385	2011 NK_{1}	—	December 29, 2008	Mount Lemmon	Mount Lemmon Survey	·	1.5 km	MPC · JPL
353386	2011 NX_{3}	—	March 24, 2003	Kitt Peak	Spacewatch	·	1.2 km	MPC · JPL
353387	2011 NY_{3}	—	July 30, 2005	Palomar	NEAT	·	3.5 km	MPC · JPL
353388	2011 OL_{1}	—	September 13, 2007	Catalina	CSS	·	2.5 km	MPC · JPL
353389	2011 OY_{3}	—	January 27, 2006	Kitt Peak	Spacewatch	V	700 m	MPC · JPL
353390	2011 OB_{4}	—	September 29, 2008	Mount Lemmon	Mount Lemmon Survey	·	910 m	MPC · JPL
353391	2011 ON_{12}	—	September 23, 2000	Socorro	LINEAR	·	1.5 km	MPC · JPL
353392	2011 OP_{17}	—	May 17, 1999	Anderson Mesa	LONEOS	·	2.4 km	MPC · JPL
353393	2011 OC_{20}	—	October 21, 2007	Catalina	CSS	·	1.8 km	MPC · JPL
353394	2011 OY_{20}	—	September 24, 2008	Kitt Peak	Spacewatch	·	770 m	MPC · JPL
353395	2011 OJ_{23}	—	August 6, 2004	Campo Imperatore	CINEOS	·	820 m	MPC · JPL
353396	2011 OO_{28}	—	September 27, 2000	Kitt Peak	Spacewatch	·	1.3 km	MPC · JPL
353397	2011 OG_{39}	—	June 21, 2007	Anderson Mesa	LONEOS	·	2.0 km	MPC · JPL
353398	2011 PR	—	January 16, 2005	Kitt Peak	Spacewatch	H	570 m	MPC · JPL
353399	2011 PF_{5}	—	September 26, 2000	Kitt Peak	Spacewatch	·	1.6 km	MPC · JPL
353400	2011 PN_{7}	—	September 26, 2008	Kitt Peak	Spacewatch	·	710 m	MPC · JPL

== 353401–353500 ==
back to top

Designation			Discovery			Properties		Ref
Permanent	Provisional	Named after	Date	Site	Discoverer(s)	Category	Diam.	Ref
353401	2011 PV_{8}	—	December 16, 2007	Catalina	CSS	·	2.1 km	MPC · JPL
353402	2011 PS_{10}	—	October 7, 1996	Kitt Peak	Spacewatch	EOS	2.0 km	MPC · JPL
353403	2011 PM_{13}	—	December 29, 2008	Mount Lemmon	Mount Lemmon Survey	·	1.2 km	MPC · JPL
353404 Laugalys	2011 PR_{13}	Laugalys	September 25, 2006	Moletai	K. Černis, J. Zdanavičius	·	2.6 km	MPC · JPL
353405	2011 PH_{15}	—	August 23, 2003	Palomar	NEAT	·	1.9 km	MPC · JPL
353406	2011 PK_{15}	—	September 16, 2006	Catalina	CSS	·	4.6 km	MPC · JPL
353407	2011 QZ	—	February 4, 2005	Kitt Peak	Spacewatch	·	1.4 km	MPC · JPL
353408	2011 QR_{1}	—	October 5, 2002	Palomar	NEAT	MRX	900 m	MPC · JPL
353409 Onaka	2011 QW_{3}	Onaka	September 14, 2002	Palomar	NEAT	·	1.9 km	MPC · JPL
353410	2011 QX_{3}	—	July 3, 2003	Kitt Peak	Spacewatch	·	1.7 km	MPC · JPL
353411	2011 QZ_{8}	—	October 10, 2007	Lulin	LUSS	·	1.5 km	MPC · JPL
353412	2011 QH_{13}	—	September 17, 2006	Catalina	CSS	·	4.4 km	MPC · JPL
353413	2011 QJ_{14}	—	July 11, 2004	Socorro	LINEAR	·	870 m	MPC · JPL
353414	2011 QO_{14}	—	August 23, 2003	Palomar	NEAT	·	1.4 km	MPC · JPL
353415	2011 QY_{16}	—	December 2, 2008	Mount Lemmon	Mount Lemmon Survey	·	1.8 km	MPC · JPL
353416	2011 QG_{17}	—	March 21, 2004	Kitt Peak	Spacewatch	·	3.3 km	MPC · JPL
353417	2011 QG_{18}	—	January 31, 2006	Kitt Peak	Spacewatch	MAS	900 m	MPC · JPL
353418	2011 QO_{18}	—	September 3, 2007	Mount Lemmon	Mount Lemmon Survey	·	1.4 km	MPC · JPL
353419	2011 QK_{22}	—	September 4, 2008	Kitt Peak	Spacewatch	V	1.0 km	MPC · JPL
353420	2011 QL_{22}	—	December 29, 2008	Mount Lemmon	Mount Lemmon Survey	·	2.3 km	MPC · JPL
353421	2011 QL_{23}	—	September 17, 2003	Kitt Peak	Spacewatch	MAR	860 m	MPC · JPL
353422	2011 QU_{23}	—	February 29, 2000	Socorro	LINEAR	·	2.0 km	MPC · JPL
353423	2011 QU_{27}	—	September 24, 2000	Socorro	LINEAR	·	2.3 km	MPC · JPL
353424	2011 QL_{32}	—	October 2, 2000	Socorro	LINEAR	MAS	860 m	MPC · JPL
353425	2011 QX_{40}	—	August 1, 2010	WISE	WISE	·	2.6 km	MPC · JPL
353426	2011 QP_{43}	—	April 26, 1995	Kitt Peak	Spacewatch	·	1.6 km	MPC · JPL
353427	2011 QR_{43}	—	August 24, 2005	Palomar	NEAT	(69559)	3.6 km	MPC · JPL
353428	2011 QN_{44}	—	August 21, 2006	Kitt Peak	Spacewatch	·	2.2 km	MPC · JPL
353429 Fairlamb	2011 QP_{46}	Fairlamb	June 8, 2011	Haleakala	Pan-STARRS 1	·	2.6 km	MPC · JPL
353430	2011 QQ_{50}	—	October 4, 2004	Palomar	NEAT	V	780 m	MPC · JPL
353431	2011 QD_{51}	—	January 25, 2006	Kitt Peak	Spacewatch	·	1.2 km	MPC · JPL
353432 Cabrerabalears	2011 QC_{54}	Cabrerabalears	July 23, 2007	Costitx	OAM	·	1.9 km	MPC · JPL
353433	2011 QX_{56}	—	August 10, 1994	La Silla	E. W. Elst	·	4.3 km	MPC · JPL
353434	2011 QC_{60}	—	December 1, 2008	Kitt Peak	Spacewatch	V	850 m	MPC · JPL
353435	2011 QK_{60}	—	November 26, 2005	Kitt Peak	Spacewatch	·	900 m	MPC · JPL
353436	2011 QW_{62}	—	March 30, 2003	Anderson Mesa	LONEOS	V	760 m	MPC · JPL
353437	2011 QP_{63}	—	November 16, 2006	Mount Lemmon	Mount Lemmon Survey	·	3.8 km	MPC · JPL
353438	2011 QJ_{67}	—	October 16, 2006	Catalina	CSS	·	2.6 km	MPC · JPL
353439	2011 QT_{68}	—	February 7, 1997	Kitt Peak	Spacewatch	·	2.7 km	MPC · JPL
353440	2011 QS_{70}	—	August 19, 1995	Xinglong	SCAP	·	910 m	MPC · JPL
353441	2011 QW_{70}	—	August 28, 2003	Palomar	NEAT	·	1.4 km	MPC · JPL
353442	2011 QD_{73}	—	June 17, 2007	Kitt Peak	Spacewatch	·	1.6 km	MPC · JPL
353443	2011 QW_{75}	—	January 23, 2006	Mount Lemmon	Mount Lemmon Survey	·	1.2 km	MPC · JPL
353444	2011 QU_{76}	—	June 17, 2007	Kitt Peak	Spacewatch	PHO	1.3 km	MPC · JPL
353445	2011 QS_{78}	—	September 4, 2007	Mount Lemmon	Mount Lemmon Survey	V	990 m	MPC · JPL
353446	2011 QZ_{90}	—	December 18, 2003	Kitt Peak	Spacewatch	·	2.2 km	MPC · JPL
353447	2011 QB_{93}	—	December 17, 2007	Kitt Peak	Spacewatch	·	2.1 km	MPC · JPL
353448	2011 QZ_{97}	—	September 5, 2000	Apache Point	SDSS	V	990 m	MPC · JPL
353449	2011 QP_{98}	—	November 11, 2007	Mount Lemmon	Mount Lemmon Survey	·	3.7 km	MPC · JPL
353450	2011 QU_{98}	—	April 11, 2002	Socorro	LINEAR	·	2.0 km	MPC · JPL
353451	2011 QZ_{98}	—	October 15, 2001	Palomar	NEAT	·	2.6 km	MPC · JPL
353452	2011 RW_{2}	—	March 4, 2005	Kitt Peak	Spacewatch	MAR	1.1 km	MPC · JPL
353453	2011 RC_{4}	—	February 25, 2007	Mount Lemmon	Mount Lemmon Survey	·	790 m	MPC · JPL
353454	2011 RY_{9}	—	November 15, 2006	Catalina	CSS	·	3.8 km	MPC · JPL
353455	2011 RE_{10}	—	November 2, 2007	Kitt Peak	Spacewatch	·	1.7 km	MPC · JPL
353456	2011 RR_{11}	—	March 16, 2009	Mount Lemmon	Mount Lemmon Survey	·	2.2 km	MPC · JPL
353457	2011 RG_{13}	—	February 9, 2008	Mount Lemmon	Mount Lemmon Survey	·	2.9 km	MPC · JPL
353458	2011 RZ_{14}	—	August 29, 2006	Kitt Peak	Spacewatch	·	3.1 km	MPC · JPL
353459	2011 RK_{16}	—	August 1, 2000	Socorro	LINEAR	·	1.4 km	MPC · JPL
353460	2011 RC_{19}	—	January 15, 2004	Kitt Peak	Spacewatch	·	2.0 km	MPC · JPL
353461	2011 RD_{19}	—	September 19, 2006	Catalina	CSS	·	2.2 km	MPC · JPL
353462	2011 RW_{19}	—	October 8, 1996	Kitt Peak	Spacewatch	V	960 m	MPC · JPL
353463	2011 SP	—	December 28, 2005	Kitt Peak	Spacewatch	·	750 m	MPC · JPL
353464	2011 SS_{1}	—	January 17, 2002	Cima Ekar	ADAS	LIX	3.0 km	MPC · JPL
353465	2011 SG_{2}	—	October 5, 2002	Palomar	NEAT	·	1.7 km	MPC · JPL
353466	2011 SE_{4}	—	December 17, 2001	Kitt Peak	Spacewatch	·	4.2 km	MPC · JPL
353467	2011 SU_{9}	—	October 22, 2006	Kitt Peak	Spacewatch	·	2.9 km	MPC · JPL
353468	2011 SG_{11}	—	February 8, 2002	Kitt Peak	Spacewatch	·	1.6 km	MPC · JPL
353469	2011 SW_{13}	—	September 24, 2008	Kitt Peak	Spacewatch	·	720 m	MPC · JPL
353470	2011 SV_{19}	—	December 11, 2004	Kitt Peak	Spacewatch	MAS	840 m	MPC · JPL
353471	2011 SN_{27}	—	August 31, 2000	Socorro	LINEAR	·	2.6 km	MPC · JPL
353472	2011 SV_{27}	—	July 30, 2000	Socorro	LINEAR	·	1.6 km	MPC · JPL
353473	2011 SF_{28}	—	March 19, 2010	Kitt Peak	Spacewatch	·	2.3 km	MPC · JPL
353474	2011 SP_{28}	—	June 27, 2007	Kitt Peak	Spacewatch	·	1.8 km	MPC · JPL
353475	2011 SZ_{29}	—	June 3, 2010	WISE	WISE	·	6.1 km	MPC · JPL
353476	2011 ST_{35}	—	August 18, 2006	Kitt Peak	Spacewatch	AST	2.1 km	MPC · JPL
353477	2011 SG_{36}	—	August 31, 2005	Kitt Peak	Spacewatch	·	3.3 km	MPC · JPL
353478	2011 SM_{37}	—	April 14, 2008	Kitt Peak	Spacewatch	CYB	4.0 km	MPC · JPL
353479	2011 ST_{37}	—	April 25, 2003	Kitt Peak	Spacewatch	EOS	2.4 km	MPC · JPL
353480	2011 SA_{40}	—	August 26, 2001	Kitt Peak	Spacewatch	KOR	1.6 km	MPC · JPL
353481	2011 SR_{40}	—	February 26, 2008	Mount Lemmon	Mount Lemmon Survey	EUN	1.5 km	MPC · JPL
353482	2011 SD_{45}	—	October 1, 2008	Kitt Peak	Spacewatch	·	1.7 km	MPC · JPL
353483	2011 SS_{51}	—	September 18, 2004	Socorro	LINEAR	V	760 m	MPC · JPL
353484	2011 SY_{57}	—	October 10, 2007	Mount Lemmon	Mount Lemmon Survey	·	1.5 km	MPC · JPL
353485	2011 SA_{61}	—	August 9, 2007	Kitt Peak	Spacewatch	MAS	950 m	MPC · JPL
353486	2011 SO_{63}	—	September 9, 1977	Palomar	C. J. van Houten, I. van Houten-Groeneveld, T. Gehrels	·	3.1 km	MPC · JPL
353487	2011 SB_{64}	—	October 4, 2000	Socorro	LINEAR	·	3.2 km	MPC · JPL
353488	2011 SF_{65}	—	December 23, 2001	Kitt Peak	Spacewatch	·	3.0 km	MPC · JPL
353489	2011 ST_{70}	—	May 23, 2001	Cerro Tololo	Deep Ecliptic Survey	KOR	1.9 km	MPC · JPL
353490	2011 SP_{71}	—	January 15, 2009	Kitt Peak	Spacewatch	·	1.6 km	MPC · JPL
353491	2011 SZ_{71}	—	January 30, 2006	Kitt Peak	Spacewatch	·	1.7 km	MPC · JPL
353492	2011 SJ_{72}	—	April 4, 2010	Catalina	CSS	·	1.3 km	MPC · JPL
353493	2011 SP_{74}	—	September 30, 2006	Mount Lemmon	Mount Lemmon Survey	·	3.5 km	MPC · JPL
353494	2011 SL_{80}	—	October 22, 2008	Kitt Peak	Spacewatch	·	1.0 km	MPC · JPL
353495	2011 SQ_{82}	—	October 1, 2000	Socorro	LINEAR	·	1.3 km	MPC · JPL
353496	2011 SU_{82}	—	March 8, 2008	Mount Lemmon	Mount Lemmon Survey	·	2.8 km	MPC · JPL
353497	2011 SB_{84}	—	November 18, 2006	Mount Lemmon	Mount Lemmon Survey	·	2.9 km	MPC · JPL
353498	2011 SA_{85}	—	October 2, 2006	Mount Lemmon	Mount Lemmon Survey	KOR	1.6 km	MPC · JPL
353499	2011 SF_{86}	—	September 12, 2007	Catalina	CSS	·	1.5 km	MPC · JPL
353500	2011 SK_{86}	—	February 17, 2004	Kitt Peak	Spacewatch	·	2.8 km	MPC · JPL

== 353501–353600 ==
back to top

Designation			Discovery			Properties		Ref
Permanent	Provisional	Named after	Date	Site	Discoverer(s)	Category	Diam.	Ref
353501	2011 SJ_{88}	—	September 15, 2006	Kitt Peak	Spacewatch	HOF	2.7 km	MPC · JPL
353502	2011 SZ_{88}	—	August 17, 2006	Palomar	NEAT	·	2.7 km	MPC · JPL
353503	2011 SP_{89}	—	June 15, 2010	Mount Lemmon	Mount Lemmon Survey	·	3.1 km	MPC · JPL
353504	2011 SK_{90}	—	June 17, 2005	Mount Lemmon	Mount Lemmon Survey	fast	2.4 km	MPC · JPL
353505	2011 SY_{90}	—	October 30, 2007	Catalina	CSS	·	1.5 km	MPC · JPL
353506	2011 SD_{92}	—	August 17, 2006	Palomar	NEAT	·	2.5 km	MPC · JPL
353507	2011 SW_{97}	—	October 4, 2006	Mount Lemmon	Mount Lemmon Survey	EOS	2.3 km	MPC · JPL
353508	2011 SG_{98}	—	October 8, 1993	Kitt Peak	Spacewatch	V	790 m	MPC · JPL
353509	2011 SA_{100}	—	May 4, 2005	Kitt Peak	Spacewatch	·	2.8 km	MPC · JPL
353510	2011 SR_{100}	—	March 15, 2002	Palomar	NEAT	MAS	810 m	MPC · JPL
353511	2011 SA_{111}	—	December 30, 2007	Mount Lemmon	Mount Lemmon Survey	·	2.9 km	MPC · JPL
353512	2011 SK_{111}	—	March 20, 2002	Kitt Peak	Deep Ecliptic Survey	·	1.5 km	MPC · JPL
353513	2011 SR_{111}	—	July 4, 2005	Mount Lemmon	Mount Lemmon Survey	EOS	2.1 km	MPC · JPL
353514	2011 SV_{113}	—	September 13, 2002	Palomar	NEAT	·	2.1 km	MPC · JPL
353515	2011 SE_{115}	—	March 23, 2004	Kitt Peak	Spacewatch	·	3.0 km	MPC · JPL
353516	2011 SV_{116}	—	March 21, 1999	Apache Point	SDSS	·	1.4 km	MPC · JPL
353517	2011 SE_{120}	—	February 23, 2004	Socorro	LINEAR	·	2.1 km	MPC · JPL
353518	2011 SZ_{121}	—	October 12, 2006	Kitt Peak	Spacewatch	·	2.1 km	MPC · JPL
353519	2011 SS_{123}	—	November 19, 2006	Kitt Peak	Spacewatch	·	2.3 km	MPC · JPL
353520	2011 SS_{126}	—	February 28, 2009	Kitt Peak	Spacewatch	HOF	3.0 km	MPC · JPL
353521	2011 SE_{128}	—	April 7, 2003	Kitt Peak	Spacewatch	·	3.0 km	MPC · JPL
353522	2011 SW_{128}	—	November 17, 2006	Mount Lemmon	Mount Lemmon Survey	·	2.1 km	MPC · JPL
353523	2011 SM_{131}	—	January 31, 2006	Kitt Peak	Spacewatch	NYS	1.5 km	MPC · JPL
353524	2011 SJ_{133}	—	October 3, 2006	Mount Lemmon	Mount Lemmon Survey	·	1.5 km	MPC · JPL
353525	2011 SB_{136}	—	October 4, 2002	Socorro	LINEAR	·	2.2 km	MPC · JPL
353526	2011 SO_{136}	—	August 15, 2006	Palomar	NEAT	AGN	1.3 km	MPC · JPL
353527	2011 SF_{139}	—	October 9, 2007	Mount Lemmon	Mount Lemmon Survey	·	2.0 km	MPC · JPL
353528	2011 SH_{141}	—	March 17, 2005	Kitt Peak	Spacewatch	NEM	2.4 km	MPC · JPL
353529	2011 SQ_{142}	—	March 27, 2000	Kitt Peak	Spacewatch	AGN	1.3 km	MPC · JPL
353530	2011 SE_{143}	—	April 4, 2003	Kitt Peak	Spacewatch	·	5.6 km	MPC · JPL
353531	2011 SY_{143}	—	August 26, 2005	Palomar	NEAT	ELF	6.8 km	MPC · JPL
353532	2011 SC_{156}	—	February 20, 2009	Kitt Peak	Spacewatch	·	1.9 km	MPC · JPL
353533	2011 SU_{157}	—	August 6, 2005	Palomar	NEAT	HYG	2.6 km	MPC · JPL
353534	2011 SU_{158}	—	December 17, 2001	Socorro	LINEAR	EOS	1.9 km	MPC · JPL
353535	2011 SY_{166}	—	November 30, 1997	Kitt Peak	Spacewatch	KOR · fast	1.5 km	MPC · JPL
353536	2011 ST_{170}	—	October 16, 2006	Mount Lemmon	Mount Lemmon Survey	AGN	1.4 km	MPC · JPL
353537	2011 SQ_{171}	—	December 1, 2003	Kitt Peak	Spacewatch	·	1.7 km	MPC · JPL
353538	2011 SS_{171}	—	September 19, 2006	Kitt Peak	Spacewatch	AGN	1.3 km	MPC · JPL
353539	2011 SU_{173}	—	April 9, 2010	Mount Lemmon	Mount Lemmon Survey	·	1.4 km	MPC · JPL
353540	2011 SY_{174}	—	March 10, 1997	Kitt Peak	Spacewatch	·	2.7 km	MPC · JPL
353541	2011 SE_{175}	—	December 13, 2007	Socorro	LINEAR	AGN	1.4 km	MPC · JPL
353542	2011 SF_{175}	—	August 28, 2005	Kitt Peak	Spacewatch	·	3.0 km	MPC · JPL
353543	2011 SA_{176}	—	August 15, 2005	Siding Spring	SSS	·	3.6 km	MPC · JPL
353544	2011 SA_{179}	—	March 3, 2000	Kitt Peak	Spacewatch	NEM	2.5 km	MPC · JPL
353545	2011 SE_{180}	—	September 26, 2011	Kitt Peak	Spacewatch	·	2.3 km	MPC · JPL
353546	2011 SS_{181}	—	September 20, 2006	Anderson Mesa	LONEOS	AGN	1.3 km	MPC · JPL
353547	2011 SW_{181}	—	August 28, 2006	Catalina	CSS	·	2.1 km	MPC · JPL
353548	2011 SJ_{187}	—	September 14, 2006	Kitt Peak	Spacewatch	·	2.5 km	MPC · JPL
353549	2011 SR_{188}	—	August 24, 2006	Pises	Pises	·	2.3 km	MPC · JPL
353550	2011 SB_{191}	—	December 3, 2000	Haleakala	NEAT	EUP	4.4 km	MPC · JPL
353551	2011 SK_{194}	—	April 2, 2009	Kitt Peak	Spacewatch	EOS	2.0 km	MPC · JPL
353552	2011 SD_{206}	—	August 2, 2000	Kitt Peak	Spacewatch	·	2.1 km	MPC · JPL
353553	2011 SS_{208}	—	October 27, 2006	Catalina	CSS	EOS	2.2 km	MPC · JPL
353554	2011 SN_{209}	—	August 28, 2006	Kitt Peak	Spacewatch	·	2.0 km	MPC · JPL
353555	2011 SV_{211}	—	August 17, 2006	Palomar	NEAT	·	1.8 km	MPC · JPL
353556	2011 SP_{217}	—	November 13, 2006	Catalina	CSS	·	3.3 km	MPC · JPL
353557	2011 SK_{218}	—	November 11, 2006	Kitt Peak	Spacewatch	·	3.4 km	MPC · JPL
353558	2011 SX_{221}	—	September 28, 2006	Mount Lemmon	Mount Lemmon Survey	THM	2.2 km	MPC · JPL
353559	2011 SZ_{222}	—	September 24, 2000	Anderson Mesa	LONEOS	·	3.1 km	MPC · JPL
353560	2011 SO_{223}	—	March 15, 2004	Kitt Peak	Spacewatch	KOR	1.4 km	MPC · JPL
353561	2011 SN_{225}	—	November 16, 2006	Kitt Peak	Spacewatch	·	3.1 km	MPC · JPL
353562	2011 SQ_{228}	—	September 15, 2006	Kitt Peak	Spacewatch	·	1.9 km	MPC · JPL
353563	2011 SA_{229}	—	September 18, 2006	Kitt Peak	Spacewatch	·	2.3 km	MPC · JPL
353564	2011 SU_{229}	—	August 4, 2005	Palomar	NEAT	·	3.0 km	MPC · JPL
353565	2011 SF_{230}	—	August 28, 2006	Kitt Peak	Spacewatch	·	2.2 km	MPC · JPL
353566	2011 SC_{231}	—	October 4, 2002	Palomar	NEAT	NEM	2.7 km	MPC · JPL
353567	2011 SM_{231}	—	October 15, 2002	Palomar	NEAT	·	2.0 km	MPC · JPL
353568	2011 ST_{235}	—	August 20, 2000	Kitt Peak	Spacewatch	EOS	1.8 km	MPC · JPL
353569	2011 SO_{245}	—	November 5, 2007	Mount Lemmon	Mount Lemmon Survey	KOR	1.7 km	MPC · JPL
353570	2011 SA_{246}	—	February 20, 2009	Kitt Peak	Spacewatch	·	3.7 km	MPC · JPL
353571	2011 SO_{249}	—	November 10, 2006	Kitt Peak	Spacewatch	EOS	2.6 km	MPC · JPL
353572	2011 SA_{252}	—	July 29, 2005	Palomar	NEAT	·	3.4 km	MPC · JPL
353573	2011 SK_{254}	—	February 23, 2003	Campo Imperatore	CINEOS	·	3.5 km	MPC · JPL
353574	2011 SX_{255}	—	January 17, 2004	Kitt Peak	Spacewatch	·	1.8 km	MPC · JPL
353575	2011 SG_{256}	—	February 10, 2002	Socorro	LINEAR	·	3.4 km	MPC · JPL
353576	2011 SM_{256}	—	April 4, 2003	Kitt Peak	Spacewatch	·	3.2 km	MPC · JPL
353577 Gediminas	2011 SW_{259}	Gediminas	January 5, 2008	Baldone	K. Černis, I. Eglītis	·	1.6 km	MPC · JPL
353578	2011 SY_{259}	—	September 20, 2006	Kitt Peak	Spacewatch	·	2.0 km	MPC · JPL
353579	2011 SC_{262}	—	March 9, 2002	Palomar	NEAT	·	1.3 km	MPC · JPL
353580	2011 SD_{272}	—	September 16, 2006	Catalina	CSS	EOS	2.2 km	MPC · JPL
353581	2011 SM_{272}	—	July 30, 2005	Palomar	NEAT	·	3.9 km	MPC · JPL
353582	2011 SP_{272}	—	December 3, 2000	Haleakala	NEAT	LIX	5.4 km	MPC · JPL
353583	2011 ST_{274}	—	October 19, 2006	Kitt Peak	Spacewatch	·	3.7 km	MPC · JPL
353584	2011 SD_{275}	—	March 20, 2010	Kitt Peak	Spacewatch	·	1.4 km	MPC · JPL
353585	2011 TV	—	October 3, 2006	Mount Lemmon	Mount Lemmon Survey	·	2.7 km	MPC · JPL
353586	2011 TT_{1}	—	October 3, 2006	Mount Lemmon	Mount Lemmon Survey	·	1.6 km	MPC · JPL
353587	2011 TK_{2}	—	December 5, 2002	Kitt Peak	Spacewatch	KOR	1.5 km	MPC · JPL
353588	2011 TN_{2}	—	July 21, 2006	Mount Lemmon	Mount Lemmon Survey	NAE	3.0 km	MPC · JPL
353589	2011 TM_{3}	—	September 19, 2006	Eskridge	G. Hug	·	2.5 km	MPC · JPL
353590	2011 TG_{4}	—	April 23, 2009	Kitt Peak	Spacewatch	·	4.5 km	MPC · JPL
353591	2011 TX_{7}	—	September 27, 2002	Palomar	NEAT	·	1.8 km	MPC · JPL
353592	2011 TY_{10}	—	November 13, 2007	Kitt Peak	Spacewatch	·	1.8 km	MPC · JPL
353593	2011 TZ_{10}	—	July 6, 2005	Kitt Peak	Spacewatch	(159)	2.9 km	MPC · JPL
353594	2011 TQ_{11}	—	November 10, 2006	Lulin	LUSS	EOS	2.7 km	MPC · JPL
353595 Grancanaria	2011 TL_{12}	Grancanaria	August 24, 2005	Palomar	NEAT	·	3.3 km	MPC · JPL
353596	2011 TM_{13}	—	January 25, 2009	Kitt Peak	Spacewatch	·	1.5 km	MPC · JPL
353597	2011 TO_{15}	—	May 19, 2010	Catalina	CSS	·	1.9 km	MPC · JPL
353598	2011 TL_{16}	—	September 29, 2005	Kitt Peak	Spacewatch	·	3.9 km	MPC · JPL
353599	2011 TN_{17}	—	July 10, 2005	Siding Spring	SSS	·	3.1 km	MPC · JPL
353600	2011 UV	—	September 3, 2000	Socorro	LINEAR	·	3.0 km	MPC · JPL

== 353601–353700 ==
back to top

Designation			Discovery			Properties		Ref
Permanent	Provisional	Named after	Date	Site	Discoverer(s)	Category	Diam.	Ref
353601	2011 UC_{1}	—	July 5, 2005	Mount Lemmon	Mount Lemmon Survey	·	2.5 km	MPC · JPL
353602	2011 UF_{1}	—	September 20, 2000	Kitt Peak	Spacewatch	·	3.0 km	MPC · JPL
353603	2011 UH_{1}	—	March 21, 1998	Kitt Peak	Spacewatch	EOS	2.6 km	MPC · JPL
353604	2011 UJ_{1}	—	November 14, 1995	Kitt Peak	Spacewatch	EOS	2.2 km	MPC · JPL
353605	2011 UK_{1}	—	May 7, 2000	Socorro	LINEAR	·	1.1 km	MPC · JPL
353606	2011 US_{9}	—	November 2, 2000	Kitt Peak	Spacewatch	·	2.9 km	MPC · JPL
353607	2011 UA_{11}	—	March 27, 2003	Kitt Peak	Spacewatch	·	3.4 km	MPC · JPL
353608	2011 UH_{11}	—	November 20, 2007	Kitt Peak	Spacewatch	AGN	1.1 km	MPC · JPL
353609	2011 UK_{11}	—	August 23, 2004	Kitt Peak	Spacewatch	·	850 m	MPC · JPL
353610	2011 UM_{14}	—	June 24, 2010	Mount Lemmon	Mount Lemmon Survey	·	4.6 km	MPC · JPL
353611	2011 UE_{15}	—	September 19, 2007	Kitt Peak	Spacewatch	·	1.5 km	MPC · JPL
353612	2011 UQ_{21}	—	September 12, 1994	Kitt Peak	Spacewatch	VER	2.4 km	MPC · JPL
353613	2011 UJ_{23}	—	September 25, 1995	Kitt Peak	Spacewatch	·	2.1 km	MPC · JPL
353614	2011 UE_{31}	—	October 3, 2005	Catalina	CSS	·	5.0 km	MPC · JPL
353615	2011 UY_{32}	—	December 5, 2007	Kitt Peak	Spacewatch	·	2.8 km	MPC · JPL
353616	2011 UN_{34}	—	November 1, 2007	Kitt Peak	Spacewatch	·	1.1 km	MPC · JPL
353617	2011 UW_{34}	—	December 24, 1998	Kitt Peak	Spacewatch	AGN	1.4 km	MPC · JPL
353618	2011 UD_{36}	—	September 28, 2006	Mount Lemmon	Mount Lemmon Survey	EOS	2.4 km	MPC · JPL
353619	2011 UK_{37}	—	May 15, 2005	Mount Lemmon	Mount Lemmon Survey	·	2.6 km	MPC · JPL
353620	2011 UX_{39}	—	February 22, 2004	Kitt Peak	Spacewatch	AGN	1.3 km	MPC · JPL
353621	2011 UN_{40}	—	November 5, 2007	Kitt Peak	Spacewatch	NEM	2.6 km	MPC · JPL
353622	2011 UF_{43}	—	February 13, 2008	Kitt Peak	Spacewatch	·	2.8 km	MPC · JPL
353623	2011 UM_{48}	—	September 25, 2000	Kitt Peak	Spacewatch	EOS	2.9 km	MPC · JPL
353624	2011 UC_{49}	—	October 18, 2011	Kitt Peak	Spacewatch	EOS	2.7 km	MPC · JPL
353625	2011 UF_{50}	—	March 4, 2008	Mount Lemmon	Mount Lemmon Survey	VER	2.9 km	MPC · JPL
353626	2011 UH_{53}	—	October 7, 2007	Catalina	CSS	·	2.2 km	MPC · JPL
353627	2011 UQ_{53}	—	May 31, 2006	Mount Lemmon	Mount Lemmon Survey	·	1.6 km	MPC · JPL
353628	2011 UU_{54}	—	December 28, 2005	Socorro	LINEAR	SYL · CYB	6.2 km	MPC · JPL
353629	2011 UT_{58}	—	July 22, 2007	Lulin	LUSS	·	1.6 km	MPC · JPL
353630	2011 UP_{59}	—	October 12, 1998	Kitt Peak	Spacewatch	CYB	4.5 km	MPC · JPL
353631	2011 UE_{62}	—	February 8, 2008	Catalina	CSS	·	4.9 km	MPC · JPL
353632	2011 UW_{71}	—	August 27, 2006	Kitt Peak	Spacewatch	HOF	4.2 km	MPC · JPL
353633	2011 UP_{74}	—	September 29, 2000	Kitt Peak	Spacewatch	·	2.5 km	MPC · JPL
353634	2011 UX_{75}	—	November 17, 2006	Kitt Peak	Spacewatch	·	3.7 km	MPC · JPL
353635	2011 UB_{77}	—	April 29, 2008	Mount Lemmon	Mount Lemmon Survey	LUT	4.3 km	MPC · JPL
353636	2011 UO_{77}	—	December 31, 2007	Kitt Peak	Spacewatch	HOF	3.2 km	MPC · JPL
353637	2011 UL_{78}	—	August 27, 2006	Kitt Peak	Spacewatch	·	2.2 km	MPC · JPL
353638	2011 UR_{78}	—	September 18, 2006	Kitt Peak	Spacewatch	HOF	2.9 km	MPC · JPL
353639	2011 UQ_{81}	—	May 3, 2009	Kitt Peak	Spacewatch	EOS	3.5 km	MPC · JPL
353640	2011 UJ_{82}	—	December 7, 2005	Kitt Peak	Spacewatch	CYB	4.5 km	MPC · JPL
353641	2011 UF_{86}	—	September 14, 2006	Kitt Peak	Spacewatch	·	2.3 km	MPC · JPL
353642	2011 UW_{93}	—	September 13, 2005	Kitt Peak	Spacewatch	·	2.3 km	MPC · JPL
353643	2011 UD_{95}	—	March 13, 2005	Mount Lemmon	Mount Lemmon Survey	·	2.6 km	MPC · JPL
353644	2011 UG_{100}	—	August 29, 2006	Kitt Peak	Spacewatch	HOF	2.5 km	MPC · JPL
353645	2011 UP_{106}	—	July 30, 2005	Palomar	NEAT	·	3.8 km	MPC · JPL
353646	2011 UH_{107}	—	October 18, 2007	Mount Lemmon	Mount Lemmon Survey	·	1.1 km	MPC · JPL
353647	2011 UT_{113}	—	September 15, 2006	Kitt Peak	Spacewatch	·	2.0 km	MPC · JPL
353648	2011 UY_{115}	—	October 13, 2006	Kitt Peak	Spacewatch	·	2.2 km	MPC · JPL
353649	2011 UL_{116}	—	April 2, 2005	Kitt Peak	Spacewatch	AGN	1.5 km	MPC · JPL
353650	2011 UU_{116}	—	August 31, 2005	Kitt Peak	Spacewatch	·	2.9 km	MPC · JPL
353651	2011 UE_{117}	—	October 19, 2006	Mount Lemmon	Mount Lemmon Survey	AGN	1.5 km	MPC · JPL
353652	2011 UC_{125}	—	September 4, 2007	Mount Lemmon	Mount Lemmon Survey	NYS	1.2 km	MPC · JPL
353653	2011 UT_{125}	—	August 9, 2005	Cerro Tololo	Deep Ecliptic Survey	·	2.4 km	MPC · JPL
353654	2011 UU_{126}	—	October 3, 2000	Kitt Peak	Spacewatch	·	2.5 km	MPC · JPL
353655	2011 UM_{128}	—	March 1, 2008	Kitt Peak	Spacewatch	CYB	3.9 km	MPC · JPL
353656	2011 UL_{131}	—	October 13, 2004	Kitt Peak	Spacewatch	·	1.5 km	MPC · JPL
353657	2011 UT_{134}	—	November 3, 2000	Kitt Peak	Spacewatch	EOS	2.1 km	MPC · JPL
353658	2011 US_{141}	—	January 21, 2002	Kitt Peak	Spacewatch	HYG	3.4 km	MPC · JPL
353659	2011 UV_{150}	—	September 28, 2000	Kitt Peak	Spacewatch	·	3.7 km	MPC · JPL
353660	2011 UB_{160}	—	July 4, 2005	Mount Lemmon	Mount Lemmon Survey	EOS	2.2 km	MPC · JPL
353661	2011 UR_{164}	—	September 18, 2001	Apache Point	SDSS	·	2.7 km	MPC · JPL
353662	2011 UE_{175}	—	February 12, 2004	Kitt Peak	Spacewatch	·	2.1 km	MPC · JPL
353663	2011 UA_{176}	—	September 27, 1997	Kitt Peak	Spacewatch	·	1.1 km	MPC · JPL
353664	2011 UF_{188}	—	June 1, 2005	Mount Lemmon	Mount Lemmon Survey	·	2.4 km	MPC · JPL
353665	2011 UD_{190}	—	October 21, 2003	Socorro	LINEAR	3:2	4.7 km	MPC · JPL
353666	2011 UJ_{190}	—	August 17, 2006	Palomar	NEAT	GEF	1.4 km	MPC · JPL
353667	2011 US_{193}	—	October 16, 2006	Catalina	CSS	·	2.5 km	MPC · JPL
353668	2011 UB_{196}	—	November 20, 2006	Kitt Peak	Spacewatch	·	2.2 km	MPC · JPL
353669	2011 UP_{196}	—	February 18, 2004	Kitt Peak	Spacewatch	·	3.8 km	MPC · JPL
353670	2011 UX_{204}	—	November 18, 2007	Mount Lemmon	Mount Lemmon Survey	·	4.9 km	MPC · JPL
353671	2011 UU_{205}	—	February 13, 2008	Mount Lemmon	Mount Lemmon Survey	EOS	2.2 km	MPC · JPL
353672	2011 UB_{217}	—	February 13, 2004	Kitt Peak	Spacewatch	(12739)	2.2 km	MPC · JPL
353673	2011 UR_{219}	—	March 1, 2009	Kitt Peak	Spacewatch	·	2.3 km	MPC · JPL
353674	2011 UA_{220}	—	September 19, 2006	Anderson Mesa	LONEOS	AST	2.2 km	MPC · JPL
353675	2011 UZ_{226}	—	November 20, 2006	Mount Lemmon	Mount Lemmon Survey	THM	2.4 km	MPC · JPL
353676	2011 UF_{229}	—	April 6, 2005	Mount Lemmon	Mount Lemmon Survey	·	2.1 km	MPC · JPL
353677 Harald	2011 UV_{235}	Harald	January 18, 2002	Cima Ekar	ADAS	EOS	3.9 km	MPC · JPL
353678	2011 UK_{254}	—	October 23, 2003	Kitt Peak	Spacewatch	T_{j} (2.98) · 3:2	4.9 km	MPC · JPL
353679	2011 UF_{257}	—	March 15, 2004	Kitt Peak	Spacewatch	AST	1.8 km	MPC · JPL
353680	2011 US_{264}	—	January 19, 2004	Kitt Peak	Spacewatch	WIT	1.3 km	MPC · JPL
353681	2011 US_{285}	—	October 18, 2007	Kitt Peak	Spacewatch	·	1.8 km	MPC · JPL
353682 Maberry	2011 UJ_{286}	Maberry	June 19, 2006	Mount Lemmon	Mount Lemmon Survey	GEF	1.5 km	MPC · JPL
353683	2011 UH_{295}	—	November 14, 2002	Kitt Peak	Spacewatch	·	1.9 km	MPC · JPL
353684	2011 UZ_{302}	—	September 16, 2006	Catalina	CSS	·	3.8 km	MPC · JPL
353685	2011 UY_{304}	—	March 31, 2003	Piszkéstető	K. Sárneczky	·	980 m	MPC · JPL
353686	2011 UK_{306}	—	March 31, 2009	Kitt Peak	Spacewatch	AGN	1.4 km	MPC · JPL
353687	2011 UP_{306}	—	August 22, 2007	Anderson Mesa	LONEOS	·	1.5 km	MPC · JPL
353688	2011 UT_{307}	—	October 22, 2006	Mount Lemmon	Mount Lemmon Survey	EOS	2.3 km	MPC · JPL
353689	2011 UT_{309}	—	February 12, 2008	Mount Lemmon	Mount Lemmon Survey	·	4.4 km	MPC · JPL
353690	2011 UK_{322}	—	September 17, 2006	Kitt Peak	Spacewatch	·	2.0 km	MPC · JPL
353691	2011 UT_{325}	—	March 9, 1999	Kitt Peak	Spacewatch	·	2.0 km	MPC · JPL
353692	2011 UA_{335}	—	October 21, 2003	Kitt Peak	Spacewatch	3:2	5.0 km	MPC · JPL
353693	2011 US_{335}	—	November 5, 2007	Mount Lemmon	Mount Lemmon Survey	(12739)	1.7 km	MPC · JPL
353694	2011 UO_{336}	—	August 28, 2006	Anderson Mesa	LONEOS	·	1.9 km	MPC · JPL
353695	2011 UL_{339}	—	December 30, 2008	Kitt Peak	Spacewatch	·	1.8 km	MPC · JPL
353696	2011 UC_{347}	—	February 14, 2009	Kitt Peak	Spacewatch	·	2.1 km	MPC · JPL
353697	2011 UZ_{359}	—	September 28, 2006	Mount Lemmon	Mount Lemmon Survey	·	2.9 km	MPC · JPL
353698	2011 UP_{368}	—	August 29, 2005	Kitt Peak	Spacewatch	·	3.0 km	MPC · JPL
353699	2011 UN_{379}	—	August 28, 2005	Siding Spring	SSS	·	3.4 km	MPC · JPL
353700	2011 UX_{382}	—	August 31, 2005	Kitt Peak	Spacewatch	EOS	2.1 km	MPC · JPL

== 353701–353800 ==
back to top

Designation			Discovery			Properties		Ref
Permanent	Provisional	Named after	Date	Site	Discoverer(s)	Category	Diam.	Ref
353701	2011 UL_{385}	—	February 11, 2004	Kitt Peak	Spacewatch	·	2.0 km	MPC · JPL
353702	2011 UY_{390}	—	January 20, 1996	Kitt Peak	Spacewatch	·	3.6 km	MPC · JPL
353703	2011 UN_{392}	—	August 30, 2005	Kitt Peak	Spacewatch	VER	4.4 km	MPC · JPL
353704	2011 UK_{394}	—	October 26, 2005	Kitt Peak	Spacewatch	CYB	4.6 km	MPC · JPL
353705	2011 UL_{400}	—	August 27, 2005	Anderson Mesa	LONEOS	·	3.9 km	MPC · JPL
353706	2011 UD_{406}	—	October 25, 2000	Socorro	LINEAR	·	3.3 km	MPC · JPL
353707	2011 UR_{407}	—	August 29, 2005	Kitt Peak	Spacewatch	·	3.3 km	MPC · JPL
353708	2011 UZ_{407}	—	January 26, 2006	Kitt Peak	Spacewatch	·	1.9 km	MPC · JPL
353709	2011 VM	—	February 8, 2002	Palomar	NEAT	·	4.6 km	MPC · JPL
353710	2011 VH_{1}	—	August 31, 2005	Kitt Peak	Spacewatch	EOS	2.1 km	MPC · JPL
353711	2011 VK_{4}	—	September 30, 2006	Catalina	CSS	·	2.3 km	MPC · JPL
353712	2011 VA_{6}	—	November 16, 2006	Kitt Peak	Spacewatch	·	2.3 km	MPC · JPL
353713	2011 VC_{7}	—	October 25, 2005	Catalina	CSS	·	5.6 km	MPC · JPL
353714	2011 VQ_{8}	—	July 31, 2010	WISE	WISE	·	6.9 km	MPC · JPL
353715	2011 VZ_{8}	—	June 29, 2005	Kitt Peak	Spacewatch	EOS	2.1 km	MPC · JPL
353716	2011 VA_{10}	—	September 19, 2001	Kitt Peak	Spacewatch	·	600 m	MPC · JPL
353717	2011 VN_{14}	—	January 20, 2007	Charleston	R. Holmes	·	3.7 km	MPC · JPL
353718	2011 VS_{21}	—	October 27, 2006	Mount Lemmon	Mount Lemmon Survey	·	1.7 km	MPC · JPL
353719	2011 WM	—	September 13, 1996	Kitt Peak	Spacewatch	·	1.9 km	MPC · JPL
353720	2011 WY	—	February 13, 2008	Kitt Peak	Spacewatch	·	4.3 km	MPC · JPL
353721	2011 WR_{1}	—	November 1, 2010	Mount Lemmon	Mount Lemmon Survey	L4	9.6 km	MPC · JPL
353722	2011 WT_{19}	—	September 26, 2006	Kitt Peak	Spacewatch	·	2.3 km	MPC · JPL
353723	2011 WK_{33}	—	April 22, 2009	Mount Lemmon	Mount Lemmon Survey	·	3.8 km	MPC · JPL
353724	2011 WO_{33}	—	February 20, 2009	Mount Lemmon	Mount Lemmon Survey	·	1.7 km	MPC · JPL
353725	2011 WV_{37}	—	January 19, 2004	Kitt Peak	Spacewatch	(5)	1.4 km	MPC · JPL
353726	2011 WO_{54}	—	May 19, 2005	Mount Lemmon	Mount Lemmon Survey	PAD	3.1 km	MPC · JPL
353727	2011 WF_{62}	—	September 18, 2010	Mount Lemmon	Mount Lemmon Survey	L4	7.6 km	MPC · JPL
353728	2011 WD_{98}	—	September 23, 2005	Kitt Peak	Spacewatch	·	4.0 km	MPC · JPL
353729	2011 WT_{106}	—	March 10, 2008	Mount Lemmon	Mount Lemmon Survey	·	4.0 km	MPC · JPL
353730 Patton	2011 WN_{114}	Patton	November 25, 2005	Mauna Kea	P. A. Wiegert, D. D. Balam	·	4.7 km	MPC · JPL
353731	2011 WR_{114}	—	August 29, 1995	La Silla	C.-I. Lagerkvist	·	2.3 km	MPC · JPL
353732	2011 WC_{124}	—	September 27, 2006	Mount Lemmon	Mount Lemmon Survey	·	2.0 km	MPC · JPL
353733	2011 WC_{145}	—	August 21, 2006	Kitt Peak	Spacewatch	·	1.9 km	MPC · JPL
353734	2011 WM_{147}	—	February 9, 2008	Mount Lemmon	Mount Lemmon Survey	EOS	2.3 km	MPC · JPL
353735	2011 WL_{150}	—	February 13, 2008	Mount Lemmon	Mount Lemmon Survey	EOS	2.8 km	MPC · JPL
353736	2011 WT_{152}	—	March 17, 2005	Mount Lemmon	Mount Lemmon Survey	MAR	950 m	MPC · JPL
353737	2011 XO_{1}	—	November 12, 2010	Mount Lemmon	Mount Lemmon Survey	L4	10 km	MPC · JPL
353738	2011 YP	—	January 7, 2010	WISE	WISE	L4	10 km	MPC · JPL
353739	2011 YN_{8}	—	September 27, 2009	Mount Lemmon	Mount Lemmon Survey	L4	9.3 km	MPC · JPL
353740	2011 YB_{18}	—	October 12, 2010	Mount Lemmon	Mount Lemmon Survey	L4 · ERY	8.5 km	MPC · JPL
353741	2011 YC_{25}	—	November 28, 2005	Kitt Peak	Spacewatch	·	4.7 km	MPC · JPL
353742	2011 YE_{28}	—	November 24, 2011	Haleakala	Pan-STARRS 1	L4	10 km	MPC · JPL
353743	2011 YN_{40}	—	September 29, 2009	Mount Lemmon	Mount Lemmon Survey	L4 · ERY	10 km	MPC · JPL
353744	2011 YL_{45}	—	December 2, 2010	Mount Lemmon	Mount Lemmon Survey	L4	9.3 km	MPC · JPL
353745 Williamunruh	2011 YE_{47}	Williamunruh	September 11, 2005	Kitt Peak	Spacewatch	EOS	2.3 km	MPC · JPL
353746	2011 YN_{49}	—	February 7, 2008	Mount Lemmon	Mount Lemmon Survey	·	1.9 km	MPC · JPL
353747	2011 YK_{57}	—	October 14, 2009	Mount Lemmon	Mount Lemmon Survey	L4	10 km	MPC · JPL
353748	2011 YT_{65}	—	October 1, 2009	Mount Lemmon	Mount Lemmon Survey	L4	9.4 km	MPC · JPL
353749	2011 YP_{74}	—	May 19, 2004	Kitt Peak	Spacewatch	L4	10 km	MPC · JPL
353750	2012 AG_{11}	—	December 17, 2003	Anderson Mesa	LONEOS	·	2.0 km	MPC · JPL
353751	2012 BS_{6}	—	January 27, 2007	Kitt Peak	Spacewatch	·	1.9 km	MPC · JPL
353752	2012 BC_{16}	—	December 6, 2005	Kitt Peak	Spacewatch	·	4.4 km	MPC · JPL
353753	2012 BU_{57}	—	September 24, 2008	Mount Lemmon	Mount Lemmon Survey	L4	9.4 km	MPC · JPL
353754	2012 BK_{82}	—	January 27, 2007	Kitt Peak	Spacewatch	·	2.5 km	MPC · JPL
353755	2012 BW_{101}	—	September 9, 2008	Mount Lemmon	Mount Lemmon Survey	L4	8.4 km	MPC · JPL
353756	2012 BR_{102}	—	March 6, 2002	Palomar	NEAT	·	3.0 km	MPC · JPL
353757	2012 BO_{137}	—	December 5, 2007	Kitt Peak	Spacewatch	·	1.4 km	MPC · JPL
353758	2012 BR_{151}	—	April 5, 2003	Kitt Peak	Spacewatch	KOR	2.0 km	MPC · JPL
353759	2012 CE_{8}	—	February 1, 1995	Kitt Peak	Spacewatch	VER	4.0 km	MPC · JPL
353760	2012 CY_{23}	—	September 24, 2003	Palomar	NEAT	·	4.1 km	MPC · JPL
353761	2012 CF_{52}	—	September 11, 2007	Mount Lemmon	Mount Lemmon Survey	L4	8.8 km	MPC · JPL
353762	2012 DR_{24}	—	January 19, 2001	Kitt Peak	Spacewatch	EOS	2.4 km	MPC · JPL
353763	2012 DK_{55}	—	March 24, 2004	Siding Spring	SSS	H	660 m	MPC · JPL
353764	2012 DX_{83}	—	November 6, 2005	Mount Lemmon	Mount Lemmon Survey	NEM	3.1 km	MPC · JPL
353765	2012 FK_{1}	—	January 27, 2000	Kitt Peak	Spacewatch	THM	2.8 km	MPC · JPL
353766	2012 FQ_{28}	—	June 5, 2005	Junk Bond	D. Healy	NYS	1.4 km	MPC · JPL
353767	2012 FF_{35}	—	December 27, 2006	Mount Lemmon	Mount Lemmon Survey	·	1.7 km	MPC · JPL
353768	2012 GP_{22}	—	November 10, 2004	Kitt Peak	Spacewatch	TEL	2.0 km	MPC · JPL
353769	2012 GC_{30}	—	October 19, 1999	Kitt Peak	Spacewatch	·	960 m	MPC · JPL
353770	2012 HB_{4}	—	April 24, 2001	Kitt Peak	Spacewatch	LIX	4.5 km	MPC · JPL
353771	2012 HZ_{17}	—	December 3, 2007	Kitt Peak	Spacewatch	·	1.0 km	MPC · JPL
353772	2012 HM_{23}	—	January 11, 2008	Kitt Peak	Spacewatch	NYS	1.3 km	MPC · JPL
353773	2012 HK_{25}	—	April 11, 2005	Kitt Peak	Spacewatch	·	1.1 km	MPC · JPL
353774	2012 HF_{43}	—	March 13, 2007	Mount Lemmon	Mount Lemmon Survey	·	2.4 km	MPC · JPL
353775	2012 HS_{56}	—	January 26, 2006	Mount Lemmon	Mount Lemmon Survey	·	3.0 km	MPC · JPL
353776	2012 HU_{61}	—	January 31, 2006	Catalina	CSS	·	2.9 km	MPC · JPL
353777	2012 HS_{74}	—	October 23, 2001	Palomar	NEAT	·	2.1 km	MPC · JPL
353778	2012 HA_{77}	—	August 28, 2003	Palomar	NEAT	EOS	2.7 km	MPC · JPL
353779	2012 HR_{78}	—	January 18, 2004	Palomar	NEAT	CYB	5.8 km	MPC · JPL
353780	2012 JP_{2}	—	April 12, 2002	Socorro	LINEAR	·	720 m	MPC · JPL
353781	2012 JO_{23}	—	May 29, 2008	Mount Lemmon	Mount Lemmon Survey	·	2.1 km	MPC · JPL
353782	2012 JB_{60}	—	November 17, 2006	Mount Lemmon	Mount Lemmon Survey	·	1.2 km	MPC · JPL
353783	2012 KC_{21}	—	April 7, 2005	Kitt Peak	Spacewatch	·	910 m	MPC · JPL
353784	2012 KM_{26}	—	July 6, 1997	Kitt Peak	Spacewatch	·	2.6 km	MPC · JPL
353785	2012 KW_{30}	—	October 7, 2004	Palomar	NEAT	GEF	2.0 km	MPC · JPL
353786	2012 KZ_{45}	—	August 24, 2001	Anderson Mesa	LONEOS	·	4.3 km	MPC · JPL
353787	2012 MQ_{7}	—	June 29, 2001	Kitt Peak	Spacewatch	PHO	1.8 km	MPC · JPL
353788	2012 OK_{1}	—	September 30, 1999	Catalina	CSS	·	2.3 km	MPC · JPL
353789	2012 PG_{15}	—	September 8, 1999	Socorro	LINEAR	EUN	1.7 km	MPC · JPL
353790	2012 PE_{32}	—	November 21, 2009	Kitt Peak	Spacewatch	·	1.6 km	MPC · JPL
353791	2012 PH_{43}	—	September 24, 1992	Kitt Peak	Spacewatch	KOR	1.6 km	MPC · JPL
353792	2012 QR_{19}	—	February 23, 2007	Mount Lemmon	Mount Lemmon Survey	NYS	1.5 km	MPC · JPL
353793	2012 QK_{25}	—	September 19, 1995	Kitt Peak	Spacewatch	·	3.2 km	MPC · JPL
353794	2012 QO_{33}	—	September 17, 2003	Kitt Peak	Spacewatch	HNS	1.5 km	MPC · JPL
353795	2012 QY_{41}	—	December 28, 2005	Catalina	CSS	·	2.1 km	MPC · JPL
353796	2012 RR_{6}	—	September 6, 2012	Mount Lemmon	Mount Lemmon Survey	L5	10 km	MPC · JPL
353797	2012 RO_{20}	—	April 12, 2005	Mount Lemmon	Mount Lemmon Survey	·	2.7 km	MPC · JPL
353798	2012 RL_{31}	—	January 31, 1998	Kitt Peak	Spacewatch	·	5.0 km	MPC · JPL
353799	2012 ST_{16}	—	October 4, 2004	Kitt Peak	Spacewatch	·	1.5 km	MPC · JPL
353800	2012 TP_{37}	—	October 23, 2001	Palomar	NEAT	·	3.4 km	MPC · JPL

== 353801–353900 ==
back to top

Designation			Discovery			Properties		Ref
Permanent	Provisional	Named after	Date	Site	Discoverer(s)	Category	Diam.	Ref
353801	2012 TR_{52}	—	October 5, 2000	Kitt Peak	Spacewatch	L5	9.4 km	MPC · JPL
353802	2012 TP_{68}	—	October 20, 1995	Kitt Peak	Spacewatch	·	1.6 km	MPC · JPL
353803	2012 TY_{99}	—	March 20, 1999	Apache Point	SDSS	EOS	2.4 km	MPC · JPL
353804	2012 TM_{106}	—	September 14, 2007	Mount Lemmon	Mount Lemmon Survey	KOR	1.4 km	MPC · JPL
353805	2012 TZ_{124}	—	September 19, 2003	Palomar	NEAT	·	2.1 km	MPC · JPL
353806	2012 TB_{132}	—	October 23, 2003	Haleakala	NEAT	WIT	1.3 km	MPC · JPL
353807	2012 TY_{149}	—	December 10, 2005	Kitt Peak	Spacewatch	NYS	1.1 km	MPC · JPL
353808	2012 TD_{200}	—	August 29, 2005	Kitt Peak	Spacewatch	·	850 m	MPC · JPL
353809	2012 TF_{214}	—	September 29, 2008	Mount Lemmon	Mount Lemmon Survey	·	1.6 km	MPC · JPL
353810	2012 TU_{215}	—	September 12, 2001	Kitt Peak	Deep Ecliptic Survey	MAS	800 m	MPC · JPL
353811	2012 TM_{216}	—	December 14, 2001	Socorro	LINEAR	·	1.3 km	MPC · JPL
353812	2012 TW_{222}	—	May 23, 2006	Mount Lemmon	Mount Lemmon Survey	(5)	1.5 km	MPC · JPL
353813	2012 TY_{230}	—	February 14, 2010	WISE	WISE	·	5.6 km	MPC · JPL
353814	2012 TJ_{243}	—	October 20, 2003	Kitt Peak	Spacewatch	·	1.9 km	MPC · JPL
353815	2012 TF_{309}	—	August 12, 2001	Palomar	NEAT	·	1.5 km	MPC · JPL
353816	2012 TH_{310}	—	December 28, 2002	Kitt Peak	Spacewatch	EOS	2.3 km	MPC · JPL
353817 Bolduc-Duval	2012 TV_{310}	Bolduc-Duval	September 15, 1995	Saanich	D. D. Balam	·	600 m	MPC · JPL
353818	2012 TF_{311}	—	April 4, 2005	Mount Lemmon	Mount Lemmon Survey	·	2.1 km	MPC · JPL
353819	2012 TN_{312}	—	August 21, 2007	Anderson Mesa	LONEOS	DOR	2.7 km	MPC · JPL
353820	2012 TC_{315}	—	March 7, 2003	Palomar	NEAT	·	3.0 km	MPC · JPL
353821	2012 TH_{317}	—	January 26, 2003	Anderson Mesa	LONEOS	·	4.6 km	MPC · JPL
353822	2012 TJ_{317}	—	July 8, 2003	Palomar	NEAT	·	2.5 km	MPC · JPL
353823	2012 TC_{319}	—	August 10, 1994	La Silla	E. W. Elst	·	1.8 km	MPC · JPL
353824	2012 UP_{38}	—	October 25, 2008	Kitt Peak	Spacewatch	·	1.2 km	MPC · JPL
353825	2012 UU_{39}	—	October 9, 1999	Kitt Peak	Spacewatch	·	660 m	MPC · JPL
353826	2012 UF_{56}	—	August 28, 2006	Catalina	CSS	·	4.3 km	MPC · JPL
353827	2012 UJ_{56}	—	August 24, 2007	Kitt Peak	Spacewatch	·	2.0 km	MPC · JPL
353828	2012 UE_{61}	—	November 16, 2003	Kitt Peak	Spacewatch	·	1.6 km	MPC · JPL
353829	2012 UW_{88}	—	December 18, 2007	Kitt Peak	Spacewatch	·	2.2 km	MPC · JPL
353830	2012 UX_{97}	—	September 14, 2006	Palomar	NEAT	·	3.4 km	MPC · JPL
353831	2012 UA_{102}	—	May 20, 2006	Mount Lemmon	Mount Lemmon Survey	·	1.9 km	MPC · JPL
353832	2012 UX_{108}	—	January 13, 2005	Kitt Peak	Spacewatch	·	1.6 km	MPC · JPL
353833	2012 UE_{122}	—	November 20, 2007	Mount Lemmon	Mount Lemmon Survey	·	1.9 km	MPC · JPL
353834	2012 UX_{134}	—	October 18, 2003	Needville	Garossino, P. G. A.	·	2.1 km	MPC · JPL
353835	2012 UV_{135}	—	September 19, 2001	Apache Point	SDSS	·	3.6 km	MPC · JPL
353836	2012 UV_{147}	—	December 14, 2003	Kitt Peak	Spacewatch	·	1.9 km	MPC · JPL
353837	2012 UP_{150}	—	March 13, 2005	Kitt Peak	Spacewatch	AGN	1.4 km	MPC · JPL
353838	2012 UE_{167}	—	November 19, 2000	Socorro	LINEAR	EUN	1.5 km	MPC · JPL
353839	2012 VV_{16}	—	December 2, 2004	Palomar	NEAT	·	1.8 km	MPC · JPL
353840	2012 VX_{16}	—	March 7, 2003	Apache Point	SDSS	EMA	4.4 km	MPC · JPL
353841	2012 VF_{17}	—	December 10, 2004	Kitt Peak	Spacewatch	·	1.5 km	MPC · JPL
353842	2012 VO_{19}	—	November 19, 2003	Kitt Peak	Spacewatch	·	1.9 km	MPC · JPL
353843	2012 VD_{35}	—	September 19, 2006	Catalina	CSS	·	2.9 km	MPC · JPL
353844	2012 VM_{35}	—	February 2, 2009	Mount Lemmon	Mount Lemmon Survey	·	4.2 km	MPC · JPL
353845	2012 VU_{37}	—	October 19, 2006	Catalina	CSS	·	4.5 km	MPC · JPL
353846	2012 VF_{39}	—	November 21, 2003	Socorro	LINEAR	·	2.2 km	MPC · JPL
353847	2012 VH_{40}	—	October 21, 2003	Palomar	NEAT	·	2.4 km	MPC · JPL
353848	2012 VN_{42}	—	January 23, 2006	Kitt Peak	Spacewatch	·	1.6 km	MPC · JPL
353849	2012 VZ_{42}	—	February 17, 2010	Kitt Peak	Spacewatch	·	2.1 km	MPC · JPL
353850	2012 VE_{45}	—	January 14, 2002	Kitt Peak	Spacewatch	·	1.5 km	MPC · JPL
353851	2012 VS_{51}	—	January 15, 2008	Mount Lemmon	Mount Lemmon Survey	KOR	1.8 km	MPC · JPL
353852	2012 VE_{52}	—	December 20, 1995	Kitt Peak	Spacewatch	·	1.9 km	MPC · JPL
353853	2012 VV_{78}	—	November 14, 2007	Mount Lemmon	Mount Lemmon Survey	·	3.3 km	MPC · JPL
353854	2012 VS_{85}	—	March 10, 2007	Kitt Peak	Spacewatch	·	630 m	MPC · JPL
353855	2012 VP_{90}	—	October 6, 2008	Kitt Peak	Spacewatch	·	1.2 km	MPC · JPL
353856	2012 VX_{90}	—	November 19, 2003	Kitt Peak	Spacewatch	·	1.6 km	MPC · JPL
353857	2012 VP_{92}	—	October 2, 2003	Kitt Peak	Spacewatch	·	1.8 km	MPC · JPL
353858	2012 VE_{93}	—	October 7, 2005	Mount Lemmon	Mount Lemmon Survey	·	1.1 km	MPC · JPL
353859	2012 VN_{93}	—	January 30, 2009	Catalina	CSS	JUN	1.1 km	MPC · JPL
353860	2012 VU_{93}	—	December 7, 2005	Kitt Peak	Spacewatch	·	940 m	MPC · JPL
353861	2012 VV_{96}	—	April 9, 2010	Mount Lemmon	Mount Lemmon Survey	·	4.0 km	MPC · JPL
353862	2012 VV_{97}	—	August 15, 2006	Siding Spring	SSS	·	5.1 km	MPC · JPL
353863	2012 VP_{98}	—	May 25, 2006	Mount Lemmon	Mount Lemmon Survey	·	2.6 km	MPC · JPL
353864	2012 VF_{103}	—	October 19, 2006	Catalina	CSS	·	3.9 km	MPC · JPL
353865	2012 VL_{104}	—	November 9, 2007	Kitt Peak	Spacewatch	·	2.3 km	MPC · JPL
353866	2012 WN_{2}	—	October 13, 2001	Kitt Peak	Spacewatch	·	2.2 km	MPC · JPL
353867	2012 WE_{3}	—	November 11, 2004	Kitt Peak	Spacewatch	·	1.2 km	MPC · JPL
353868	2012 WG_{5}	—	September 12, 2001	Kitt Peak	Spacewatch	NYS	710 m	MPC · JPL
353869	2012 WE_{8}	—	June 7, 2006	Siding Spring	SSS	·	2.8 km	MPC · JPL
353870	2012 WJ_{9}	—	February 9, 2003	Haleakala	NEAT	EMA	5.4 km	MPC · JPL
353871	2012 WO_{9}	—	November 18, 2001	Apache Point	SDSS	·	2.1 km	MPC · JPL
353872	2012 WY_{14}	—	September 21, 2006	Anderson Mesa	LONEOS	HYG	2.7 km	MPC · JPL
353873	2012 WF_{15}	—	October 29, 2003	Kitt Peak	Spacewatch	·	2.2 km	MPC · JPL
353874	2012 WX_{15}	—	November 14, 2007	Kitt Peak	Spacewatch	EOS	2.6 km	MPC · JPL
353875	2012 WC_{17}	—	January 13, 2003	Socorro	LINEAR	PHO	1.0 km	MPC · JPL
353876	2012 WV_{21}	—	February 28, 2006	Mount Lemmon	Mount Lemmon Survey	·	1.9 km	MPC · JPL
353877	2012 WD_{24}	—	October 14, 2001	Apache Point	SDSS	·	2.3 km	MPC · JPL
353878	2012 WM_{24}	—	October 20, 2003	Kitt Peak	Spacewatch	·	2.4 km	MPC · JPL
353879	2012 WF_{28}	—	September 19, 1995	Kitt Peak	Spacewatch	·	3.5 km	MPC · JPL
353880	2012 WF_{33}	—	April 21, 2006	Kitt Peak	Spacewatch	ADE	2.2 km	MPC · JPL
353881	2012 WX_{34}	—	October 16, 2006	Catalina	CSS	HYG	3.5 km	MPC · JPL
353882	2012 XX_{2}	—	November 30, 2005	Kitt Peak	Spacewatch	V	810 m	MPC · JPL
353883	2012 XH_{4}	—	May 23, 2003	Kitt Peak	Spacewatch	·	1.6 km	MPC · JPL
353884	2012 XP_{4}	—	September 2, 2002	Kitt Peak	Spacewatch	AGN	1.4 km	MPC · JPL
353885	2012 XC_{8}	—	May 7, 2010	Mount Lemmon	Mount Lemmon Survey	EOS	2.7 km	MPC · JPL
353886	2012 XY_{9}	—	December 31, 2002	Kitt Peak	Spacewatch	·	2.3 km	MPC · JPL
353887	2012 XD_{14}	—	September 11, 2007	Mount Lemmon	Mount Lemmon Survey	·	1.8 km	MPC · JPL
353888	2012 XF_{16}	—	November 21, 2008	Kitt Peak	Spacewatch	·	2.4 km	MPC · JPL
353889	2012 XJ_{17}	—	December 18, 2001	Socorro	LINEAR	·	4.5 km	MPC · JPL
353890	2012 XF_{29}	—	April 12, 2005	Kitt Peak	Spacewatch	KOR	1.7 km	MPC · JPL
353891	2012 XX_{33}	—	December 30, 2007	Kitt Peak	Spacewatch	·	2.7 km	MPC · JPL
353892	2012 XA_{35}	—	March 19, 2009	Catalina	CSS	·	2.9 km	MPC · JPL
353893	2012 XK_{37}	—	December 14, 2007	Mount Lemmon	Mount Lemmon Survey	·	2.6 km	MPC · JPL
353894	2012 XV_{37}	—	November 19, 2001	Socorro	LINEAR	·	3.1 km	MPC · JPL
353895	2012 XQ_{38}	—	May 8, 2005	Mount Lemmon	Mount Lemmon Survey	KOR	1.8 km	MPC · JPL
353896	2012 XM_{39}	—	October 14, 2001	Kitt Peak	Spacewatch	·	2.0 km	MPC · JPL
353897	2012 XP_{41}	—	December 4, 2002	Kitt Peak	Deep Ecliptic Survey	·	2.3 km	MPC · JPL
353898	2012 XU_{46}	—	August 30, 2005	Palomar	NEAT	CYB	4.3 km	MPC · JPL
353899	2012 XB_{48}	—	December 18, 2001	Socorro	LINEAR	·	1.6 km	MPC · JPL
353900	2012 XE_{53}	—	December 28, 2007	Kitt Peak	Spacewatch	·	2.5 km	MPC · JPL

== 353901–354000 ==
back to top

Designation			Discovery			Properties		Ref
Permanent	Provisional	Named after	Date	Site	Discoverer(s)	Category	Diam.	Ref
353901	2012 XJ_{53}	—	December 25, 1998	Kitt Peak	Spacewatch	V	770 m	MPC · JPL
353902	2012 XM_{53}	—	June 23, 2007	Kitt Peak	Spacewatch	·	1.4 km	MPC · JPL
353903 Kudritzki	2012 XN_{58}	Kudritzki	November 19, 2001	Socorro	LINEAR	EOS	2.6 km	MPC · JPL
353904	2012 XJ_{67}	—	January 13, 2002	Socorro	LINEAR	·	4.0 km	MPC · JPL
353905	2012 XT_{76}	—	February 2, 2005	Kitt Peak	Spacewatch	·	1.7 km	MPC · JPL
353906	2012 XY_{84}	—	August 21, 2006	Kitt Peak	Spacewatch	·	3.2 km	MPC · JPL
353907	2012 XP_{104}	—	February 4, 2009	Mount Lemmon	Mount Lemmon Survey	·	2.4 km	MPC · JPL
353908	2012 XR_{105}	—	April 17, 2005	Kitt Peak	Spacewatch	·	1.5 km	MPC · JPL
353909	2012 XB_{110}	—	November 30, 2005	Kitt Peak	Spacewatch	V	600 m	MPC · JPL
353910	2012 XH_{116}	—	September 23, 2005	Kitt Peak	Spacewatch	·	660 m	MPC · JPL
353911	2012 XQ_{116}	—	November 20, 2000	Socorro	LINEAR	·	1.4 km	MPC · JPL
353912	2012 XL_{118}	—	April 11, 1996	Kitt Peak	Spacewatch	(2076)	1.0 km	MPC · JPL
353913	2012 XY_{120}	—	October 11, 2001	Socorro	LINEAR	·	3.3 km	MPC · JPL
353914	2012 XG_{122}	—	October 10, 2002	Apache Point	SDSS	·	2.2 km	MPC · JPL
353915	2012 XN_{125}	—	February 27, 2006	Kitt Peak	Spacewatch	(5)	1.6 km	MPC · JPL
353916	2012 XL_{133}	—	January 15, 2005	Kitt Peak	Spacewatch	·	1.5 km	MPC · JPL
353917	2012 XP_{135}	—	December 12, 1996	Kitt Peak	Spacewatch	·	3.9 km	MPC · JPL
353918	2012 XL_{139}	—	June 21, 2007	Mount Lemmon	Mount Lemmon Survey	·	1.6 km	MPC · JPL
353919	2012 XQ_{144}	—	January 10, 2002	Palomar	NEAT	·	3.5 km	MPC · JPL
353920	2012 XL_{146}	—	September 20, 1995	Kitt Peak	Spacewatch	·	1.1 km	MPC · JPL
353921	2012 XW_{147}	—	February 20, 2006	Catalina	CSS	V	830 m	MPC · JPL
353922	2012 XN_{149}	—	November 18, 2007	Mount Lemmon	Mount Lemmon Survey	·	4.6 km	MPC · JPL
353923	4531 P-L	—	September 24, 1960	Palomar	C. J. van Houten, I. van Houten-Groeneveld, T. Gehrels	NYS	1.1 km	MPC · JPL
353924	6756 P-L	—	September 24, 1960	Palomar	C. J. van Houten, I. van Houten-Groeneveld, T. Gehrels	·	1.2 km	MPC · JPL
353925	1199 T-2	—	September 29, 1973	Palomar	C. J. van Houten, I. van Houten-Groeneveld, T. Gehrels	·	1.7 km	MPC · JPL
353926	1101 T-3	—	October 17, 1977	Palomar	C. J. van Houten, I. van Houten-Groeneveld, T. Gehrels	·	990 m	MPC · JPL
353927	1992 ED_{2}	—	March 5, 1992	Kitt Peak	Spacewatch	·	1.6 km	MPC · JPL
353928	1995 DW_{5}	—	February 23, 1995	Kitt Peak	Spacewatch	CYB	5.9 km	MPC · JPL
353929	1995 FZ_{10}	—	March 27, 1995	Kitt Peak	Spacewatch	·	2.2 km	MPC · JPL
353930	1995 OX_{17}	—	August 28, 1995	Kitt Peak	Spacewatch	L4	8.8 km	MPC · JPL
353931	1995 QL_{4}	—	August 20, 1995	Kitt Peak	Spacewatch	·	1.2 km	MPC · JPL
353932	1995 WZ_{13}	—	November 16, 1995	Kitt Peak	Spacewatch	·	2.5 km	MPC · JPL
353933	1995 WM_{19}	—	November 17, 1995	Kitt Peak	Spacewatch	·	3.0 km	MPC · JPL
353934	1995 WB_{36}	—	November 21, 1995	Kitt Peak	Spacewatch	·	2.3 km	MPC · JPL
353935	1996 RB_{3}	—	September 14, 1996	Haleakala	NEAT	H	790 m	MPC · JPL
353936	1997 EJ_{29}	—	March 2, 1997	Kitt Peak	Spacewatch	·	5.6 km	MPC · JPL
353937	1997 SO_{14}	—	September 28, 1997	Kitt Peak	Spacewatch	·	770 m	MPC · JPL
353938	1998 QR_{15}	—	August 23, 1998	Socorro	LINEAR	AMO	770 m	MPC · JPL
353939	1998 QH_{61}	—	August 23, 1998	Anderson Mesa	LONEOS	·	2.5 km	MPC · JPL
353940	1998 QG_{85}	—	August 24, 1998	Socorro	LINEAR	·	920 m	MPC · JPL
353941	1998 SD_{40}	—	September 24, 1998	Kitt Peak	Spacewatch	·	1.0 km	MPC · JPL
353942	1998 SR_{176}	—	September 22, 1998	Anderson Mesa	LONEOS	·	1.0 km	MPC · JPL
353943	1998 TU_{29}	—	October 15, 1998	Catalina	CSS	·	1.8 km	MPC · JPL
353944	1998 XO_{6}	—	December 8, 1998	Kitt Peak	Spacewatch	·	680 m	MPC · JPL
353945	1998 YH_{14}	—	December 20, 1998	Kitt Peak	Spacewatch	·	2.0 km	MPC · JPL
353946	1999 AQ_{28}	—	December 22, 1998	Kitt Peak	Spacewatch	PAD	2.0 km	MPC · JPL
353947	1999 CT_{8}	—	February 9, 1999	Socorro	LINEAR	APO	630 m	MPC · JPL
353948	1999 FH_{5}	—	March 18, 1999	Kitt Peak	Spacewatch	·	680 m	MPC · JPL
353949	1999 FL_{93}	—	March 21, 1999	Apache Point	SDSS	·	1.3 km	MPC · JPL
353950	1999 RP_{30}	—	September 8, 1999	Socorro	LINEAR	PHO	2.4 km	MPC · JPL
353951	1999 RE_{39}	—	September 6, 1999	Catalina	CSS	·	1.7 km	MPC · JPL
353952	1999 RL_{84}	—	September 7, 1999	Socorro	LINEAR	·	3.9 km	MPC · JPL
353953	1999 SC_{21}	—	September 30, 1999	Kitt Peak	Spacewatch	·	3.4 km	MPC · JPL
353954	1999 TH_{73}	—	October 10, 1999	Kitt Peak	Spacewatch	·	3.3 km	MPC · JPL
353955	1999 TG_{87}	—	October 15, 1999	Kitt Peak	Spacewatch	RAF	1.0 km	MPC · JPL
353956	1999 TQ_{232}	—	October 5, 1999	Catalina	CSS	H	640 m	MPC · JPL
353957	1999 TE_{264}	—	October 15, 1999	Kitt Peak	Spacewatch	VER	3.3 km	MPC · JPL
353958	1999 TF_{304}	—	October 4, 1999	Kitt Peak	Spacewatch	·	2.9 km	MPC · JPL
353959	1999 UC_{23}	—	October 31, 1999	Kitt Peak	Spacewatch	·	1.1 km	MPC · JPL
353960	1999 UG_{40}	—	October 16, 1999	Socorro	LINEAR	·	900 m	MPC · JPL
353961	1999 VD_{71}	—	November 4, 1999	Socorro	LINEAR	ADE	2.3 km	MPC · JPL
353962	1999 VB_{89}	—	November 4, 1999	Socorro	LINEAR	BRG	1.5 km	MPC · JPL
353963	1999 VG_{95}	—	October 4, 1999	Catalina	CSS	·	1.4 km	MPC · JPL
353964	1999 VY_{152}	—	November 10, 1999	Kitt Peak	Spacewatch	·	980 m	MPC · JPL
353965	1999 WU_{5}	—	November 29, 1999	Kitt Peak	Spacewatch	·	4.4 km	MPC · JPL
353966	1999 XO_{41}	—	December 7, 1999	Socorro	LINEAR	·	1.4 km	MPC · JPL
353967	1999 XM_{136}	—	December 12, 1999	Catalina	CSS	·	3.0 km	MPC · JPL
353968	1999 XP_{227}	—	December 15, 1999	Kitt Peak	Spacewatch	H	770 m	MPC · JPL
353969	1999 XG_{244}	—	December 3, 1999	Kitt Peak	Spacewatch	·	1.4 km	MPC · JPL
353970	1999 YT_{17}	—	December 28, 1999	Socorro	LINEAR	·	1.7 km	MPC · JPL
353971	2000 AE_{210}	—	January 5, 2000	Kitt Peak	Spacewatch	L4	15 km	MPC · JPL
353972	2000 AD_{218}	—	January 8, 2000	Kitt Peak	Spacewatch	·	1.5 km	MPC · JPL
353973	2000 BS_{39}	—	January 27, 2000	Kitt Peak	Spacewatch	·	1.4 km	MPC · JPL
353974	2000 CY_{2}	—	February 2, 2000	Socorro	LINEAR	H	780 m	MPC · JPL
353975	2000 CY_{58}	—	February 6, 2000	Socorro	LINEAR	·	1.9 km	MPC · JPL
353976	2000 CU_{107}	—	February 5, 2000	Kitt Peak	M. W. Buie	·	1.3 km	MPC · JPL
353977	2000 CC_{142}	—	February 3, 2000	Kitt Peak	Spacewatch	·	1.7 km	MPC · JPL
353978	2000 DJ_{32}	—	February 29, 2000	Socorro	LINEAR	·	2.1 km	MPC · JPL
353979	2000 DH_{97}	—	February 29, 2000	Socorro	LINEAR	EUN	1.6 km	MPC · JPL
353980	2000 EB_{1}	—	March 3, 2000	Socorro	LINEAR	EUN	1.7 km	MPC · JPL
353981	2000 ER_{9}	—	March 3, 2000	Socorro	LINEAR	·	1.7 km	MPC · JPL
353982	2000 EZ_{13}	—	March 2, 2000	Catalina	CSS	·	1.0 km	MPC · JPL
353983	2000 GM_{43}	—	April 5, 2000	Socorro	LINEAR	·	720 m	MPC · JPL
353984	2000 GN_{84}	—	April 3, 2000	Socorro	LINEAR	·	2.0 km	MPC · JPL
353985	2000 JW_{60}	—	May 7, 2000	Socorro	LINEAR	·	710 m	MPC · JPL
353986	2000 LV_{1}	—	June 4, 2000	Socorro	LINEAR	PHO	1.0 km	MPC · JPL
353987	2000 OQ_{19}	—	July 30, 2000	Socorro	LINEAR	·	1.3 km	MPC · JPL
353988	2000 QD_{115}	—	August 25, 2000	Socorro	LINEAR	·	1.4 km	MPC · JPL
353989	2000 QJ_{238}	—	August 25, 2000	Cerro Tololo	M. W. Buie	·	790 m	MPC · JPL
353990	2000 QB_{245}	—	August 25, 2000	Cerro Tololo	M. W. Buie	MAS	620 m	MPC · JPL
353991	2000 RL_{19}	—	September 1, 2000	Socorro	LINEAR	·	4.5 km	MPC · JPL
353992	2000 RJ_{59}	—	September 7, 2000	Kitt Peak	Spacewatch	·	1.1 km	MPC · JPL
353993	2000 SU_{18}	—	September 23, 2000	Socorro	LINEAR	·	2.9 km	MPC · JPL
353994	2000 SL_{56}	—	September 24, 2000	Socorro	LINEAR	·	1.8 km	MPC · JPL
353995	2000 SG_{70}	—	September 4, 2000	Anderson Mesa	LONEOS	·	2.6 km	MPC · JPL
353996	2000 SB_{106}	—	September 24, 2000	Socorro	LINEAR	NYS	1.2 km	MPC · JPL
353997	2000 SA_{184}	—	September 20, 2000	Haleakala	NEAT	V	780 m	MPC · JPL
353998	2000 SJ_{210}	—	September 25, 2000	Socorro	LINEAR	·	1.8 km	MPC · JPL
353999	2000 SZ_{256}	—	September 24, 2000	Socorro	LINEAR	·	1.4 km	MPC · JPL
354000	2000 SS_{329}	—	September 27, 2000	Kitt Peak	Spacewatch	·	1.1 km	MPC · JPL

back to top

== See also ==
- Meanings of minor-planet names: 353001–354000
