= Meanings of minor-planet names: 353001–354000 =

As minor planet discoveries are confirmed, they are given a permanent number by the IAU's Minor Planet Center (MPC), and the discoverers can then submit names for them, following the IAU's naming conventions. The list below concerns those minor planets in the specified number-range that have received names, and explains the meanings of those names.

Official naming citations of newly named small Solar System bodies are approved and published in a bulletin by IAU's Working Group for Small Bodies Nomenclature (WGSBN). Before May 2021, citations were published in MPC's Minor Planet Circulars for many decades. Recent citations can also be found on the JPL Small-Body Database (SBDB). Until his death in 2016, German astronomer Lutz D. Schmadel compiled these citations into the Dictionary of Minor Planet Names (DMP) and regularly updated the collection.

Based on Paul Herget's The Names of the Minor Planets, Schmadel also researched the unclear origin of numerous asteroids, most of which had been named prior to World War II. This article incorporates text from this source, which is in the public domain: SBDB New namings may only be added to this list below after official publication as the preannouncement of names is condemned. The WGSBN publishes a comprehensive guideline for the naming rules of non-cometary small Solar System bodies.

== 353001–353100 ==
Named minor planet	Provisional	This minor planet was named for...	Ref · Catalog
There are no named minor planets in this number range

== 353101–353200 ==
back to top

Named minor planet	Provisional	This minor planet was named for...	Ref · Catalog
353171 Cosmebauçà	2009 LU	Cosme Bauçà i Adrover (1871–1959), was a Mallorcan priest and historian.	JPL · 353171
353189 Iasus	2009 RQ_{76}	Iasus, a Greek hero in the Trojan War. A leader of the Athenians and the son of Sphelus.	JPL · 353189
353194 Meilutytė	2009 SM_{100}	Rūta Meilutytė, Lithuanian swimmer and Olympic champion.	IAU · 353194

== 353201–353300 ==
back to top

Named minor planet	Provisional	This minor planet was named for...	Ref · Catalog
353232 Nolwenn	2010 CB_{12}	Nolwenn Leroy (born 1982), a French singer and songwriter.	JPL · 353232

== 353301–353400 ==
back to top

Named minor planet	Provisional	This minor planet was named for...	Ref · Catalog
There are no named minor planets in this number range

== 353401–353500 ==
back to top

Named minor planet	Provisional	This minor planet was named for...	Ref · Catalog
353404 Laugalys	2011 PR_{13}	Vygandas Laugalys (born 1972), Lithuanian astronomer, is an expert in Galactic structure and stellar photometry. He is known as a hunter of asteroids and together with K. Černis, he discovered the first asteroid from Lithuania in 2001. He is the author of more than 40 scientific papers.	IAU · 353404
353409 Onaka	2011 QW_{3}	Peter M. Onaka (b. 1961), an American engineer.	IAU · 353409
353429 Fairlamb	2011 QP_{46}	John R. Fairlamb (b. 1988), a British astronomer.	IAU · 353429
353432 Cabrerabalears	2011 QC_{54}	Cabrera is the largest island in the Balearic Island archipelago.	IAU · 353432

== 353501–353600 ==
back to top

Named minor planet	Provisional	This minor planet was named for...	Ref · Catalog
353577 Gediminas	2011 SW_{259}	Gediminas (1275–1341), Grand Duke of Lithuania from 1315 until his death.	JPL · 353577
353595 Grancanaria	2011 TL_{12}	Gran Canaria, Spain, an island located in the Atlantic Ocean, is the most populated of the Canary Islands.	JPL · 353595

== 353601–353700 ==
back to top

Named minor planet	Provisional	This minor planet was named for...	Ref · Catalog
353677 Harald	2011 UV_{235}	Harald Michaelis (b. 1957) of the Deutsches Zentrum für Luft- und Raumfahrt e.V. (DLR) has been the head of the Planetary Sensor Systems Department for nearly three decades.	IAU · 353677
353682 Maberry	2011 UJ_{286}	Michael T. Maberry (b. 1952), the Assistant Director of the Institute for Astronomy, University of Hawaiʻi, USA.	IAU · 353682

== 353701–353800 ==
back to top

Named minor planet	Provisional	This minor planet was named for...	Ref · Catalog
353730 Patton	2011 WN_{114}	David Patton, Canadian astronomer.	IAU · 353730
353745 Williamunruh	2011 YE_{47}	William Unruh (b. 1967), the Physical Plant Manager and Safety Officer at the Institute for Astronomy at the University of Hawaiʻi,	IAU · 353745

== 353801–353900 ==
back to top

Named minor planet	Provisional	This minor planet was named for...	Ref · Catalog
353817 Bolduc-Duval	2012 TV_{310}	Julie Bolduc-Duval, Canadian astronomer.	IAU · 353817

== 353901–354000 ==
back to top

Named minor planet	Provisional	This minor planet was named for...	Ref · Catalog
353903 Kudritzki	2012 XN_{58}	Rolf-Peter Kudritzki (b. 1945), a German astronomer.	IAU · 353903

back to top

Preceded by 352,001–353,000	Meanings of minor-planet names List of minor planets: 353,001–354,000	Succeeded by 354,001–355,000
