= List of minor planets: 354001–355000 =

The following is a partial list of minor planets, running from minor-planet number 354001 through 355000, inclusive. The primary data for this and other partial lists is based on JPL's "Small-Body Orbital Elements" and data available from the Minor Planet Center. Critical list information is also provided by the MPC, unless otherwise specified from Lowell Observatory. A detailed description of the table's columns and additional sources are given on the main page including a complete list of every page in this series, and a statistical break-up on the dynamical classification of minor planets.

Also see the summary list of all named bodies in numerical and alphabetical order, and the corresponding naming citations for the number range of this particular list. New namings may only be added to this list after official publication, as the preannouncement of names is condemned by the Working Group for Small Bodies Nomenclature of the International Astronomical Union.

Near-Earth obj.	MBA (inner)	MBA (outer)	Centaur
Mars-crosser	MBA (middle)	Jupiter trojan	Trans-Neptunian obj.
Unclassified

== 354001–354100 ==
Designation			Discovery			Properties		Ref
Permanent	Provisional	Named after	Date	Site	Discoverer(s)	Category	Diam.	Ref
354001	2000 SX_{371}	—	September 24, 2000	Socorro	LINEAR	·	1.1 km	MPC · JPL
354002	2000 TR_{4}	—	October 1, 2000	Socorro	LINEAR	·	1.2 km	MPC · JPL
354003	2000 TR_{44}	—	October 1, 2000	Socorro	LINEAR	·	1.5 km	MPC · JPL
354004	2000 WE_{65}	—	November 27, 2000	Kitt Peak	Spacewatch	NYS	1.2 km	MPC · JPL
354005	2000 WW_{90}	—	November 21, 2000	Socorro	LINEAR	·	1.6 km	MPC · JPL
354006	2001 DX_{11}	—	February 17, 2001	Socorro	LINEAR	·	2.8 km	MPC · JPL
354007	2001 DC_{41}	—	February 19, 2001	Socorro	LINEAR	·	1.6 km	MPC · JPL
354008	2001 DQ_{55}	—	February 16, 2001	Kitt Peak	Spacewatch	L4	9.3 km	MPC · JPL
354009	2001 DF_{80}	—	February 22, 2001	Socorro	LINEAR	·	1.1 km	MPC · JPL
354010	2001 FN_{29}	—	March 18, 2001	Haleakala	NEAT	·	1.3 km	MPC · JPL
354011	2001 FK_{68}	—	March 19, 2001	Socorro	LINEAR	·	1.2 km	MPC · JPL
354012	2001 FG_{75}	—	March 19, 2001	Socorro	LINEAR	·	3.8 km	MPC · JPL
354013	2001 FG_{128}	—	March 29, 2001	Kitt Peak	Spacewatch	BRG	2.0 km	MPC · JPL
354014	2001 HB_{20}	—	April 26, 2001	Socorro	LINEAR	·	3.1 km	MPC · JPL
354015	2001 LQ_{6}	—	June 14, 2001	Palomar	NEAT	·	1.6 km	MPC · JPL
354016	2001 OX_{10}	—	July 20, 2001	Palomar	NEAT	·	820 m	MPC · JPL
354017	2001 OH_{11}	—	July 20, 2001	Palomar	NEAT	·	2.7 km	MPC · JPL
354018	2001 OX_{60}	—	July 21, 2001	Haleakala	NEAT	·	740 m	MPC · JPL
354019	2001 PY_{44}	—	August 11, 2001	Palomar	NEAT	·	2.6 km	MPC · JPL
354020	2001 QV_{52}	—	July 25, 2001	Haleakala	NEAT	·	1.2 km	MPC · JPL
354021	2001 QZ_{106}	—	August 22, 2001	Socorro	LINEAR	H	800 m	MPC · JPL
354022	2001 QP_{136}	—	August 22, 2001	Socorro	LINEAR	·	930 m	MPC · JPL
354023	2001 QP_{176}	—	August 23, 2001	Kitt Peak	Spacewatch	·	2.0 km	MPC · JPL
354024	2001 QU_{176}	—	August 26, 2001	Kitt Peak	Spacewatch	KOR	1.1 km	MPC · JPL
354025	2001 QN_{234}	—	August 24, 2001	Socorro	LINEAR	H	620 m	MPC · JPL
354026	2001 QL_{242}	—	August 24, 2001	Socorro	LINEAR	·	980 m	MPC · JPL
354027	2001 QJ_{249}	—	August 24, 2001	Socorro	LINEAR	H	600 m	MPC · JPL
354028	2001 QO_{266}	—	August 20, 2001	Socorro	LINEAR	·	2.5 km	MPC · JPL
354029	2001 RK_{16}	—	September 10, 2001	Eskridge	G. Hug, M. Miller	·	840 m	MPC · JPL
354030	2001 RB_{18}	—	September 12, 2001	Socorro	LINEAR	AMO	670 m	MPC · JPL
354031	2001 RJ_{47}	—	September 12, 2001	Socorro	LINEAR	H	560 m	MPC · JPL
354032	2001 RA_{55}	—	September 12, 2001	Socorro	LINEAR	·	760 m	MPC · JPL
354033	2001 RL_{57}	—	September 12, 2001	Socorro	LINEAR	·	2.3 km	MPC · JPL
354034	2001 RC_{110}	—	September 12, 2001	Socorro	LINEAR	·	740 m	MPC · JPL
354035	2001 RD_{125}	—	September 12, 2001	Socorro	LINEAR	·	680 m	MPC · JPL
354036	2001 RW_{132}	—	September 12, 2001	Socorro	LINEAR	·	860 m	MPC · JPL
354037	2001 RQ_{137}	—	September 12, 2001	Socorro	LINEAR	·	1.9 km	MPC · JPL
354038	2001 RK_{142}	—	September 12, 2001	Socorro	LINEAR	H	480 m	MPC · JPL
354039	2001 RN_{145}	—	September 8, 2001	Socorro	LINEAR	T_{j} (2.98) · 3:2	5.5 km	MPC · JPL
354040	2001 SC_{3}	—	September 17, 2001	Desert Eagle	W. K. Y. Yeung	·	820 m	MPC · JPL
354041	2001 SW_{5}	—	September 17, 2001	Socorro	LINEAR	PHO	880 m	MPC · JPL
354042	2001 SB_{28}	—	September 16, 2001	Socorro	LINEAR	·	780 m	MPC · JPL
354043	2001 SA_{29}	—	September 16, 2001	Socorro	LINEAR	·	660 m	MPC · JPL
354044	2001 SS_{92}	—	September 20, 2001	Socorro	LINEAR	·	700 m	MPC · JPL
354045	2001 SH_{145}	—	September 16, 2001	Socorro	LINEAR	·	670 m	MPC · JPL
354046	2001 SY_{151}	—	September 17, 2001	Socorro	LINEAR	·	830 m	MPC · JPL
354047	2001 SP_{156}	—	September 17, 2001	Socorro	LINEAR	DOR	3.2 km	MPC · JPL
354048	2001 SH_{162}	—	September 17, 2001	Socorro	LINEAR	H	700 m	MPC · JPL
354049	2001 SC_{190}	—	September 19, 2001	Socorro	LINEAR	·	740 m	MPC · JPL
354050	2001 SM_{255}	—	September 19, 2001	Socorro	LINEAR	·	780 m	MPC · JPL
354051	2001 SP_{296}	—	September 20, 2001	Socorro	LINEAR	EUN	1.4 km	MPC · JPL
354052	2001 SC_{314}	—	September 21, 2001	Socorro	LINEAR	·	840 m	MPC · JPL
354053	2001 SL_{325}	—	September 16, 2001	Socorro	LINEAR	·	2.6 km	MPC · JPL
354054	2001 SF_{329}	—	September 19, 2001	Socorro	LINEAR	GAL	1.9 km	MPC · JPL
354055	2001 TA_{33}	—	October 14, 2001	Socorro	LINEAR	·	920 m	MPC · JPL
354056	2001 TJ_{39}	—	October 14, 2001	Socorro	LINEAR	H	660 m	MPC · JPL
354057	2001 TM_{53}	—	October 13, 2001	Socorro	LINEAR	·	720 m	MPC · JPL
354058	2001 TT_{56}	—	October 13, 2001	Socorro	LINEAR	H	610 m	MPC · JPL
354059	2001 TR_{97}	—	October 14, 2001	Socorro	LINEAR	·	3.1 km	MPC · JPL
354060	2001 TJ_{103}	—	October 14, 2001	Socorro	LINEAR	PHO	830 m	MPC · JPL
354061	2001 TL_{108}	—	October 14, 2001	Socorro	LINEAR	·	2.3 km	MPC · JPL
354062	2001 TU_{115}	—	October 14, 2001	Socorro	LINEAR	·	980 m	MPC · JPL
354063	2001 TD_{119}	—	October 15, 2001	Socorro	LINEAR	PHO	1.2 km	MPC · JPL
354064	2001 TF_{120}	—	October 15, 2001	Socorro	LINEAR	·	1.8 km	MPC · JPL
354065	2001 TV_{132}	—	October 12, 2001	Haleakala	NEAT	·	2.6 km	MPC · JPL
354066	2001 TS_{152}	—	October 10, 2001	Palomar	NEAT	·	2.2 km	MPC · JPL
354067	2001 TQ_{177}	—	October 14, 2001	Socorro	LINEAR	·	800 m	MPC · JPL
354068	2001 TF_{185}	—	October 14, 2001	Socorro	LINEAR	·	940 m	MPC · JPL
354069	2001 TS_{252}	—	October 14, 2001	Apache Point	SDSS	·	640 m	MPC · JPL
354070	2001 UQ_{53}	—	October 17, 2001	Socorro	LINEAR	·	970 m	MPC · JPL
354071	2001 UD_{83}	—	October 20, 2001	Socorro	LINEAR	·	850 m	MPC · JPL
354072	2001 UX_{97}	—	October 17, 2001	Socorro	LINEAR	·	1.1 km	MPC · JPL
354073	2001 UN_{113}	—	October 22, 2001	Socorro	LINEAR	·	820 m	MPC · JPL
354074	2001 UY_{167}	—	October 19, 2001	Socorro	LINEAR	·	1.0 km	MPC · JPL
354075	2001 UB_{170}	—	October 21, 2001	Socorro	LINEAR	·	770 m	MPC · JPL
354076	2001 UK_{179}	—	October 26, 2001	Palomar	NEAT	·	1.0 km	MPC · JPL
354077	2001 UY_{216}	—	October 24, 2001	Kitt Peak	Spacewatch	·	680 m	MPC · JPL
354078	2001 UQ_{226}	—	October 16, 2001	Palomar	NEAT	·	800 m	MPC · JPL
354079	2001 VH_{41}	—	November 9, 2001	Socorro	LINEAR	·	870 m	MPC · JPL
354080	2001 VX_{60}	—	November 10, 2001	Socorro	LINEAR	·	1.1 km	MPC · JPL
354081	2001 VX_{76}	—	November 15, 2001	Socorro	LINEAR	PHO	1.5 km	MPC · JPL
354082	2001 VH_{104}	—	November 12, 2001	Socorro	LINEAR	·	4.4 km	MPC · JPL
354083	2001 WB_{16}	—	November 23, 2001	Uccle	T. Pauwels	·	2.1 km	MPC · JPL
354084	2001 WZ_{20}	—	November 18, 2001	Socorro	LINEAR	·	820 m	MPC · JPL
354085	2001 WO_{25}	—	November 17, 2001	Socorro	LINEAR	·	690 m	MPC · JPL
354086	2001 WZ_{45}	—	November 19, 2001	Socorro	LINEAR	·	790 m	MPC · JPL
354087	2001 WR_{57}	—	November 19, 2001	Socorro	LINEAR	·	720 m	MPC · JPL
354088	2001 WY_{70}	—	November 20, 2001	Socorro	LINEAR	·	730 m	MPC · JPL
354089	2001 XK_{15}	—	December 10, 2001	Socorro	LINEAR	·	2.2 km	MPC · JPL
354090	2001 XE_{17}	—	December 9, 2001	Socorro	LINEAR	·	1.3 km	MPC · JPL
354091	2001 XH_{19}	—	December 9, 2001	Socorro	LINEAR	·	3.4 km	MPC · JPL
354092	2001 XY_{55}	—	December 10, 2001	Socorro	LINEAR	·	1.0 km	MPC · JPL
354093	2001 XO_{132}	—	December 14, 2001	Socorro	LINEAR	NYS	920 m	MPC · JPL
354094	2001 XY_{188}	—	December 14, 2001	Socorro	LINEAR	·	2.6 km	MPC · JPL
354095	2001 XX_{219}	—	December 15, 2001	Socorro	LINEAR	·	1.0 km	MPC · JPL
354096	2001 XK_{230}	—	December 15, 2001	Socorro	LINEAR	·	930 m	MPC · JPL
354097	2001 XY_{231}	—	December 15, 2001	Socorro	LINEAR	·	1.0 km	MPC · JPL
354098	2001 XF_{248}	—	December 14, 2001	Kitt Peak	Spacewatch	·	2.8 km	MPC · JPL
354099	2001 XJ_{248}	—	December 14, 2001	Kitt Peak	Spacewatch	·	5.4 km	MPC · JPL
354100	2001 XH_{264}	—	December 14, 2001	Palomar	NEAT	·	1.7 km	MPC · JPL

== 354101–354200 ==
back to top

Designation			Discovery			Properties		Ref
Permanent	Provisional	Named after	Date	Site	Discoverer(s)	Category	Diam.	Ref
354101	2001 YF_{1}	—	December 17, 2001	Socorro	LINEAR	APO	500 m	MPC · JPL
354102	2001 YN_{16}	—	December 17, 2001	Socorro	LINEAR	·	1.3 km	MPC · JPL
354103	2001 YK_{26}	—	December 18, 2001	Socorro	LINEAR	·	2.4 km	MPC · JPL
354104	2001 YE_{34}	—	December 18, 2001	Socorro	LINEAR	·	830 m	MPC · JPL
354105	2001 YS_{79}	—	December 18, 2001	Socorro	LINEAR	·	1.2 km	MPC · JPL
354106	2001 YD_{88}	—	December 18, 2001	Socorro	LINEAR	·	1.3 km	MPC · JPL
354107	2001 YT_{98}	—	December 17, 2001	Socorro	LINEAR	EOS	2.3 km	MPC · JPL
354108	2001 YT_{101}	—	December 17, 2001	Socorro	LINEAR	·	1.2 km	MPC · JPL
354109	2001 YQ_{112}	—	December 17, 2001	Socorro	LINEAR	·	3.0 km	MPC · JPL
354110	2002 AB_{3}	—	January 7, 2002	Socorro	LINEAR	PHO	1.2 km	MPC · JPL
354111	2002 AU_{13}	—	December 18, 2001	Palomar	NEAT	·	3.7 km	MPC · JPL
354112	2002 AS_{17}	—	January 9, 2002	Socorro	LINEAR	·	1.9 km	MPC · JPL
354113	2002 AZ_{28}	—	January 13, 2002	Socorro	LINEAR	H	760 m	MPC · JPL
354114	2002 AJ_{52}	—	January 9, 2002	Socorro	LINEAR	·	1.3 km	MPC · JPL
354115	2002 AS_{93}	—	January 8, 2002	Socorro	LINEAR	·	2.5 km	MPC · JPL
354116	2002 AA_{101}	—	January 8, 2002	Socorro	LINEAR	·	2.4 km	MPC · JPL
354117	2002 AL_{113}	—	January 9, 2002	Socorro	LINEAR	EOS	2.6 km	MPC · JPL
354118	2002 AV_{114}	—	January 9, 2002	Socorro	LINEAR	·	3.2 km	MPC · JPL
354119	2002 AC_{147}	—	January 14, 2002	Socorro	LINEAR	EOS	2.6 km	MPC · JPL
354120	2002 AM_{149}	—	January 14, 2002	Socorro	LINEAR	TEL	1.7 km	MPC · JPL
354121	2002 AA_{163}	—	January 13, 2002	Socorro	LINEAR	·	4.3 km	MPC · JPL
354122	2002 AD_{165}	—	January 13, 2002	Socorro	LINEAR	·	1.1 km	MPC · JPL
354123	2002 AR_{172}	—	January 14, 2002	Socorro	LINEAR	·	1.0 km	MPC · JPL
354124	2002 AO_{181}	—	January 4, 2002	Kitt Peak	Spacewatch	·	1.2 km	MPC · JPL
354125	2002 AR_{198}	—	January 11, 2002	Anderson Mesa	LONEOS	EOS	2.7 km	MPC · JPL
354126	2002 AV_{201}	—	January 8, 2002	Socorro	LINEAR	·	1.3 km	MPC · JPL
354127	2002 BP_{26}	—	January 25, 2002	Socorro	LINEAR	AMO	490 m	MPC · JPL
354128	2002 BF_{28}	—	January 20, 2002	Anderson Mesa	LONEOS	·	1.3 km	MPC · JPL
354129	2002 CD_{19}	—	February 3, 2002	Palomar	NEAT	·	3.8 km	MPC · JPL
354130	2002 CF_{21}	—	February 5, 2002	Palomar	NEAT	·	3.0 km	MPC · JPL
354131	2002 CK_{32}	—	February 6, 2002	Socorro	LINEAR	·	1.5 km	MPC · JPL
354132	2002 CX_{34}	—	February 6, 2002	Socorro	LINEAR	·	4.2 km	MPC · JPL
354133	2002 CY_{48}	—	February 3, 2002	Haleakala	NEAT	·	3.2 km	MPC · JPL
354134	2002 CU_{52}	—	February 7, 2002	Socorro	LINEAR	H	670 m	MPC · JPL
354135	2002 CM_{63}	—	February 6, 2002	Socorro	LINEAR	·	4.8 km	MPC · JPL
354136	2002 CA_{67}	—	February 7, 2002	Socorro	LINEAR	·	3.2 km	MPC · JPL
354137	2002 CL_{70}	—	January 14, 2002	Socorro	LINEAR	·	3.9 km	MPC · JPL
354138	2002 CZ_{71}	—	February 7, 2002	Socorro	LINEAR	·	1.4 km	MPC · JPL
354139	2002 CR_{73}	—	February 7, 2002	Socorro	LINEAR	·	1.3 km	MPC · JPL
354140	2002 CF_{82}	—	February 7, 2002	Socorro	LINEAR	·	1.3 km	MPC · JPL
354141	2002 CV_{85}	—	February 7, 2002	Socorro	LINEAR	·	3.5 km	MPC · JPL
354142	2002 CP_{89}	—	February 7, 2002	Socorro	LINEAR	·	980 m	MPC · JPL
354143	2002 CK_{93}	—	February 7, 2002	Socorro	LINEAR	NYS	1.2 km	MPC · JPL
354144	2002 CB_{94}	—	February 7, 2002	Socorro	LINEAR	L4	10 km	MPC · JPL
354145	2002 CF_{109}	—	February 7, 2002	Socorro	LINEAR	·	3.5 km	MPC · JPL
354146	2002 CY_{111}	—	February 7, 2002	Socorro	LINEAR	·	1.6 km	MPC · JPL
354147	2002 CG_{117}	—	February 7, 2002	Bohyunsan	Bohyunsan	HYG	2.8 km	MPC · JPL
354148	2002 CU_{122}	—	February 7, 2002	Socorro	LINEAR	·	3.1 km	MPC · JPL
354149	2002 CH_{125}	—	February 7, 2002	Socorro	LINEAR	·	1.1 km	MPC · JPL
354150	2002 CZ_{127}	—	February 7, 2002	Socorro	LINEAR	TIR	2.8 km	MPC · JPL
354151	2002 CH_{132}	—	February 7, 2002	Socorro	LINEAR	TIR	3.4 km	MPC · JPL
354152	2002 CN_{138}	—	February 8, 2002	Socorro	LINEAR	·	1.1 km	MPC · JPL
354153	2002 CQ_{143}	—	February 9, 2002	Socorro	LINEAR	NYS	950 m	MPC · JPL
354154	2002 CM_{148}	—	February 10, 2002	Socorro	LINEAR	·	6.2 km	MPC · JPL
354155	2002 CT_{148}	—	July 30, 2000	Cerro Tololo	Deep Ecliptic Survey	·	1.7 km	MPC · JPL
354156	2002 CV_{179}	—	February 10, 2002	Socorro	LINEAR	·	3.2 km	MPC · JPL
354157	2002 CT_{188}	—	February 10, 2002	Socorro	LINEAR	THM	2.1 km	MPC · JPL
354158	2002 CF_{190}	—	February 10, 2002	Socorro	LINEAR	V	770 m	MPC · JPL
354159	2002 CK_{192}	—	January 21, 2002	Kitt Peak	Spacewatch	THM	2.3 km	MPC · JPL
354160	2002 CM_{200}	—	February 10, 2002	Socorro	LINEAR	·	3.6 km	MPC · JPL
354161	2002 CA_{208}	—	February 10, 2002	Socorro	LINEAR	·	2.2 km	MPC · JPL
354162	2002 CW_{209}	—	February 10, 2002	Socorro	LINEAR	·	1.1 km	MPC · JPL
354163	2002 CX_{217}	—	February 10, 2002	Socorro	LINEAR	H	720 m	MPC · JPL
354164	2002 CT_{218}	—	February 10, 2002	Socorro	LINEAR	·	1.5 km	MPC · JPL
354165	2002 CU_{219}	—	February 10, 2002	Socorro	LINEAR	·	5.1 km	MPC · JPL
354166	2002 CJ_{254}	—	February 5, 2002	Palomar	NEAT	NYS	1.2 km	MPC · JPL
354167	2002 CZ_{254}	—	February 6, 2002	Palomar	NEAT	·	1.3 km	MPC · JPL
354168	2002 CS_{265}	—	February 7, 2002	Kitt Peak	Spacewatch	·	1.0 km	MPC · JPL
354169	2002 CH_{267}	—	January 14, 2002	Kitt Peak	Spacewatch	·	970 m	MPC · JPL
354170	2002 CO_{269}	—	February 7, 2002	Kitt Peak	Spacewatch	·	3.1 km	MPC · JPL
354171	2002 CF_{276}	—	February 9, 2002	Palomar	NEAT	·	5.1 km	MPC · JPL
354172	2002 CG_{282}	—	January 14, 2002	Kitt Peak	Spacewatch	HYG	2.8 km	MPC · JPL
354173	2002 CG_{293}	—	February 11, 2002	Socorro	LINEAR	MAS	690 m	MPC · JPL
354174	2002 CQ_{293}	—	February 11, 2002	Socorro	LINEAR	NYS	970 m	MPC · JPL
354175	2002 CD_{296}	—	February 10, 2002	Socorro	LINEAR	·	3.1 km	MPC · JPL
354176	2002 CK_{296}	—	February 10, 2002	Socorro	LINEAR	MAS	960 m	MPC · JPL
354177	2002 CV_{299}	—	February 10, 2002	Socorro	LINEAR	·	990 m	MPC · JPL
354178	2002 CS_{314}	—	February 7, 2002	Palomar	NEAT	L4	9.5 km	MPC · JPL
354179	2002 CR_{315}	—	February 13, 2002	Apache Point	SDSS	·	4.3 km	MPC · JPL
354180	2002 CC_{318}	—	December 2, 2010	Mount Lemmon	Mount Lemmon Survey	L4	8.7 km	MPC · JPL
354181	2002 DG	—	February 7, 2002	Palomar	NEAT	·	3.7 km	MPC · JPL
354182	2002 DU_{3}	—	February 22, 2002	Socorro	LINEAR	APO · PHA	250 m	MPC · JPL
354183	2002 DD_{6}	—	February 17, 2002	Palomar	NEAT	·	1.7 km	MPC · JPL
354184	2002 DT_{14}	—	February 16, 2002	Palomar	NEAT	·	3.1 km	MPC · JPL
354185	2002 EC_{1}	—	March 5, 2002	Socorro	LINEAR	·	3.1 km	MPC · JPL
354186	2002 EV_{13}	—	March 3, 2002	Haleakala	NEAT	·	1.7 km	MPC · JPL
354187	2002 EY_{29}	—	March 9, 2002	Socorro	LINEAR	·	4.7 km	MPC · JPL
354188	2002 EY_{31}	—	March 9, 2002	Palomar	NEAT	·	3.1 km	MPC · JPL
354189	2002 EX_{36}	—	March 9, 2002	Kitt Peak	Spacewatch	HYG	3.5 km	MPC · JPL
354190	2002 EZ_{43}	—	March 12, 2002	Socorro	LINEAR	·	4.2 km	MPC · JPL
354191	2002 EU_{48}	—	March 12, 2002	Palomar	NEAT	·	1.4 km	MPC · JPL
354192	2002 EG_{52}	—	March 9, 2002	Socorro	LINEAR	·	2.1 km	MPC · JPL
354193	2002 EY_{55}	—	March 13, 2002	Socorro	LINEAR	·	3.8 km	MPC · JPL
354194	2002 EL_{67}	—	March 13, 2002	Socorro	LINEAR	·	1.4 km	MPC · JPL
354195	2002 EL_{92}	—	March 13, 2002	Socorro	LINEAR	·	1.5 km	MPC · JPL
354196	2002 EY_{92}	—	March 14, 2002	Socorro	LINEAR	·	3.7 km	MPC · JPL
354197	2002 EN_{96}	—	March 11, 2002	Kitt Peak	Spacewatch	MAS	650 m	MPC · JPL
354198	2002 EW_{96}	—	March 11, 2002	Kitt Peak	Spacewatch	·	1.2 km	MPC · JPL
354199	2002 EJ_{102}	—	March 6, 2002	Catalina	CSS	LIX	4.8 km	MPC · JPL
354200	2002 EU_{109}	—	March 9, 2002	Kitt Peak	Spacewatch	·	1.0 km	MPC · JPL

== 354201–354300 ==
back to top

Designation			Discovery			Properties		Ref
Permanent	Provisional	Named after	Date	Site	Discoverer(s)	Category	Diam.	Ref
354201	2002 EV_{111}	—	March 9, 2002	Kitt Peak	Spacewatch	·	1.1 km	MPC · JPL
354202	2002 EF_{120}	—	March 10, 2002	Cima Ekar	ADAS	L4	10 km	MPC · JPL
354203	2002 EW_{120}	—	March 11, 2002	Kitt Peak	Spacewatch	·	4.5 km	MPC · JPL
354204	2002 ER_{128}	—	March 12, 2002	Palomar	NEAT	·	1.3 km	MPC · JPL
354205	2002 ES_{129}	—	March 11, 2002	Kitt Peak	Spacewatch	THB	3.1 km	MPC · JPL
354206	2002 EC_{133}	—	March 13, 2002	Socorro	LINEAR	·	1.5 km	MPC · JPL
354207	2002 EV_{134}	—	March 13, 2002	Palomar	NEAT	·	3.3 km	MPC · JPL
354208	2002 FT	—	March 18, 2002	Desert Eagle	W. K. Y. Yeung	·	4.5 km	MPC · JPL
354209	2002 FG_{6}	—	March 19, 2002	Palomar	NEAT	T_{j} (2.95)	4.0 km	MPC · JPL
354210	2002 FY_{16}	—	March 17, 2002	Kitt Peak	Spacewatch	·	4.0 km	MPC · JPL
354211	2002 FB_{41}	—	March 21, 2002	Anderson Mesa	LONEOS	TIR	4.4 km	MPC · JPL
354212	2002 FG_{41}	—	March 20, 2002	Kitt Peak	M. W. Buie	THM	2.4 km	MPC · JPL
354213	2002 FN_{41}	—	March 18, 2002	Kitt Peak	Spacewatch	L4	9.5 km	MPC · JPL
354214	2002 GK_{27}	—	April 6, 2002	Cerro Tololo	M. W. Buie	THM	2.2 km	MPC · JPL
354215	2002 GS_{44}	—	April 4, 2002	Palomar	NEAT	·	1.1 km	MPC · JPL
354216	2002 GW_{51}	—	April 5, 2002	Palomar	NEAT	MAS	830 m	MPC · JPL
354217	2002 GP_{58}	—	April 8, 2002	Palomar	NEAT	·	1.9 km	MPC · JPL
354218	2002 GN_{92}	—	April 4, 2002	Kitt Peak	Spacewatch	·	1.7 km	MPC · JPL
354219	2002 GX_{103}	—	April 10, 2002	Socorro	LINEAR	·	1.5 km	MPC · JPL
354220	2002 GF_{122}	—	April 10, 2002	Socorro	LINEAR	NYS	1.6 km	MPC · JPL
354221	2002 GY_{160}	—	April 15, 2002	Palomar	NEAT	·	1.5 km	MPC · JPL
354222	2002 GL_{180}	—	April 4, 2002	Palomar	NEAT	·	1.6 km	MPC · JPL
354223	2002 GE_{182}	—	April 11, 2002	Palomar	NEAT	TIR	3.0 km	MPC · JPL
354224	2002 GV_{184}	—	April 2, 2002	Palomar	NEAT	NYS	1.2 km	MPC · JPL
354225	2002 HY	—	April 16, 2002	Socorro	LINEAR	T_{j} (2.96)	5.7 km	MPC · JPL
354226	2002 JK_{9}	—	May 7, 2002	Kitt Peak	Spacewatch	·	1.1 km	MPC · JPL
354227	2002 JR_{119}	—	May 5, 2002	Palomar	NEAT	·	4.3 km	MPC · JPL
354228	2002 JV_{139}	—	May 10, 2002	Palomar	NEAT	·	3.4 km	MPC · JPL
354229	2002 KC_{16}	—	May 19, 2002	Haleakala	NEAT	·	2.0 km	MPC · JPL
354230	2002 LR	—	June 1, 2002	Socorro	LINEAR	T_{j} (2.9)	3.9 km	MPC · JPL
354231	2002 MS_{5}	—	June 20, 2002	Palomar	NEAT	·	1.8 km	MPC · JPL
354232	2002 ND_{45}	—	July 12, 2002	Palomar	NEAT	·	1.7 km	MPC · JPL
354233	2002 NF_{48}	—	July 14, 2002	Palomar	NEAT	·	2.6 km	MPC · JPL
354234	2002 NB_{50}	—	July 13, 2002	Haleakala	NEAT	·	1.7 km	MPC · JPL
354235	2002 NM_{74}	—	August 8, 2002	Anderson Mesa	LONEOS	·	1.9 km	MPC · JPL
354236	2002 ND_{75}	—	August 5, 2002	Palomar	NEAT	·	1.4 km	MPC · JPL
354237	2002 OL_{11}	—	July 17, 2002	Haleakala	NEAT	·	1.8 km	MPC · JPL
354238	2002 OR_{27}	—	July 21, 2002	Palomar	NEAT	·	1.2 km	MPC · JPL
354239	2002 OZ_{29}	—	July 22, 2002	Palomar	NEAT	KON	2.4 km	MPC · JPL
354240	2002 PH_{1}	—	August 4, 2002	Socorro	LINEAR	·	2.3 km	MPC · JPL
354241	2002 PD_{4}	—	August 4, 2002	Palomar	NEAT	·	1.4 km	MPC · JPL
354242	2002 PV_{6}	—	August 4, 2002	Palomar	NEAT	·	2.6 km	MPC · JPL
354243	2002 PR_{13}	—	August 6, 2002	Palomar	NEAT	·	1.8 km	MPC · JPL
354244	2002 PT_{33}	—	August 6, 2002	Campo Imperatore	CINEOS	·	1.7 km	MPC · JPL
354245	2002 PF_{77}	—	August 11, 2002	Palomar	NEAT	·	1.6 km	MPC · JPL
354246	2002 PL_{81}	—	August 13, 2002	Palomar	NEAT	·	1.3 km	MPC · JPL
354247	2002 PK_{100}	—	August 14, 2002	Socorro	LINEAR	·	1.5 km	MPC · JPL
354248	2002 PR_{101}	—	August 12, 2002	Socorro	LINEAR	KON	2.8 km	MPC · JPL
354249	2002 PM_{103}	—	August 12, 2002	Socorro	LINEAR	·	1.8 km	MPC · JPL
354250	2002 PU_{131}	—	July 14, 2002	Palomar	NEAT	·	2.1 km	MPC · JPL
354251	2002 PR_{186}	—	August 11, 2002	Palomar	NEAT	·	1.8 km	MPC · JPL
354252	2002 PN_{193}	—	August 26, 2002	Palomar	NEAT	·	1.9 km	MPC · JPL
354253	2002 QX_{11}	—	August 26, 2002	Palomar	NEAT	EUN	1.3 km	MPC · JPL
354254	2002 QM_{22}	—	August 18, 2002	Palomar	NEAT	·	1.2 km	MPC · JPL
354255	2002 QA_{27}	—	August 27, 2002	Palomar	NEAT	EUN	1.4 km	MPC · JPL
354256	2002 QZ_{27}	—	August 28, 2002	Palomar	NEAT	EUN	1.1 km	MPC · JPL
354257	2002 QH_{28}	—	August 28, 2002	Palomar	NEAT	·	2.1 km	MPC · JPL
354258	2002 QC_{83}	—	August 16, 2002	Palomar	NEAT	(5)	1.2 km	MPC · JPL
354259	2002 QN_{83}	—	August 17, 2002	Palomar	NEAT	·	1.3 km	MPC · JPL
354260	2002 QA_{114}	—	August 27, 2002	Palomar	NEAT	·	1.6 km	MPC · JPL
354261	2002 QS_{140}	—	November 8, 2002	Apache Point	SDSS	·	1.7 km	MPC · JPL
354262	2002 QJ_{143}	—	November 1, 2008	Mount Lemmon	Mount Lemmon Survey	HNS	1.4 km	MPC · JPL
354263	2002 QK_{143}	—	August 20, 2002	Palomar	NEAT	·	1.9 km	MPC · JPL
354264	2002 QL_{145}	—	August 19, 2002	Palomar	NEAT	·	1.8 km	MPC · JPL
354265	2002 QD_{150}	—	June 22, 2006	Palomar	NEAT	·	1.6 km	MPC · JPL
354266	2002 QW_{152}	—	May 23, 2006	Mount Lemmon	Mount Lemmon Survey	(5)	1.5 km	MPC · JPL
354267	2002 QY_{153}	—	February 2, 2005	Kitt Peak	Spacewatch	·	1.7 km	MPC · JPL
354268	2002 QC_{154}	—	August 14, 2006	Reedy Creek	J. Broughton	(5)	1.8 km	MPC · JPL
354269	2002 RA_{21}	—	September 4, 2002	Anderson Mesa	LONEOS	·	2.1 km	MPC · JPL
354270	2002 RL_{76}	—	September 5, 2002	Socorro	LINEAR	·	2.2 km	MPC · JPL
354271	2002 RC_{111}	—	September 6, 2002	Socorro	LINEAR	·	2.0 km	MPC · JPL
354272	2002 RY_{138}	—	August 11, 2002	Haleakala	NEAT	·	2.2 km	MPC · JPL
354273	2002 RO_{179}	—	September 14, 2002	Kitt Peak	Spacewatch	WIT	920 m	MPC · JPL
354274	2002 RV_{186}	—	September 12, 2002	Palomar	NEAT	EUN	1.3 km	MPC · JPL
354275	2002 RK_{207}	—	September 14, 2002	Palomar	NEAT	·	910 m	MPC · JPL
354276	2002 RV_{214}	—	September 13, 2002	Socorro	LINEAR	(5)	1.6 km	MPC · JPL
354277	2002 RU_{223}	—	September 13, 2002	Haleakala	NEAT	·	5.5 km	MPC · JPL
354278	2002 RV_{237}	—	September 15, 2002	Palomar	R. Matson	·	1.9 km	MPC · JPL
354279	2002 RD_{241}	—	September 4, 2002	Palomar	NEAT	HNS	1.4 km	MPC · JPL
354280	2002 RP_{242}	—	September 14, 2002	Palomar	NEAT	·	1.4 km	MPC · JPL
354281	2002 RN_{246}	—	September 15, 2002	Palomar	NEAT	·	2.1 km	MPC · JPL
354282	2002 RV_{254}	—	September 14, 2002	Palomar	NEAT	·	1.6 km	MPC · JPL
354283	2002 RC_{257}	—	September 12, 2002	Palomar	NEAT	·	1.2 km	MPC · JPL
354284	2002 RO_{257}	—	September 3, 2002	Palomar	NEAT	(5)	1.4 km	MPC · JPL
354285	2002 RQ_{263}	—	September 13, 2002	Palomar	NEAT	·	1.8 km	MPC · JPL
354286	2002 RG_{269}	—	September 4, 2002	Palomar	NEAT	RAF	1.2 km	MPC · JPL
354287	2002 RO_{271}	—	September 4, 2002	Palomar	NEAT	·	1.4 km	MPC · JPL
354288	2002 RT_{273}	—	September 4, 2002	Palomar	NEAT	·	1.4 km	MPC · JPL
354289	2002 RX_{282}	—	November 13, 2007	Mount Lemmon	Mount Lemmon Survey	·	1.6 km	MPC · JPL
354290	2002 RM_{290}	—	September 9, 2002	Palomar	NEAT	·	1.8 km	MPC · JPL
354291	2002 RO_{290}	—	February 24, 2009	Catalina	CSS	·	1.5 km	MPC · JPL
354292	2002 SK_{12}	—	September 27, 2002	Palomar	NEAT	MAR	1.5 km	MPC · JPL
354293	2002 SD_{72}	—	September 17, 2002	Palomar	NEAT	·	1.8 km	MPC · JPL
354294	2002 TL_{60}	—	October 5, 2002	Socorro	LINEAR	·	2.2 km	MPC · JPL
354295	2002 TA_{71}	—	October 3, 2002	Palomar	NEAT	·	2.7 km	MPC · JPL
354296	2002 TO_{73}	—	October 3, 2002	Palomar	NEAT	(32418)	2.5 km	MPC · JPL
354297	2002 TE_{108}	—	October 1, 2002	Socorro	LINEAR	·	3.2 km	MPC · JPL
354298	2002 TX_{110}	—	October 2, 2002	Campo Imperatore	CINEOS	·	2.6 km	MPC · JPL
354299	2002 TK_{114}	—	October 3, 2002	Palomar	NEAT	GEF	1.5 km	MPC · JPL
354300	2002 TW_{127}	—	October 4, 2002	Palomar	NEAT	·	2.7 km	MPC · JPL

== 354301–354400 ==
back to top

Designation			Discovery			Properties		Ref
Permanent	Provisional	Named after	Date	Site	Discoverer(s)	Category	Diam.	Ref
354301	2002 TB_{148}	—	October 5, 2002	Palomar	NEAT	·	2.5 km	MPC · JPL
354302	2002 TQ_{171}	—	October 4, 2002	Palomar	NEAT	·	1.9 km	MPC · JPL
354303	2002 TO_{178}	—	October 12, 2002	Socorro	LINEAR	·	2.7 km	MPC · JPL
354304	2002 TK_{229}	—	October 7, 2002	Anderson Mesa	LONEOS	·	1.5 km	MPC · JPL
354305	2002 TD_{236}	—	October 6, 2002	Socorro	LINEAR	·	2.7 km	MPC · JPL
354306	2002 TK_{243}	—	October 9, 2002	Kitt Peak	Spacewatch	·	2.0 km	MPC · JPL
354307	2002 TD_{279}	—	October 5, 2002	Socorro	LINEAR	·	2.5 km	MPC · JPL
354308	2002 TT_{310}	—	October 4, 2002	Apache Point	SDSS	ADE	2.7 km	MPC · JPL
354309	2002 TY_{314}	—	October 4, 2002	Apache Point	SDSS	·	2.3 km	MPC · JPL
354310	2002 TJ_{316}	—	October 10, 2002	Palomar	NEAT	CLO	2.6 km	MPC · JPL
354311	2002 TS_{341}	—	October 15, 2002	Palomar	NEAT	·	1.8 km	MPC · JPL
354312	2002 UN_{1}	—	October 28, 2002	Nogales	C. W. Juels, P. R. Holvorcem	·	2.4 km	MPC · JPL
354313	2002 UP_{37}	—	October 31, 2002	Kitt Peak	Spacewatch	·	3.1 km	MPC · JPL
354314	2002 US_{47}	—	October 31, 2002	Anderson Mesa	LONEOS	AEO	1.3 km	MPC · JPL
354315	2002 UU_{51}	—	October 29, 2002	Apache Point	SDSS	MAR ·	3.5 km	MPC · JPL
354316	2002 UZ_{77}	—	October 31, 2002	Palomar	NEAT	·	2.1 km	MPC · JPL
354317	2002 VW_{47}	—	November 5, 2002	Socorro	LINEAR	·	2.3 km	MPC · JPL
354318	2002 VX_{69}	—	November 7, 2002	Socorro	LINEAR	DOR	3.0 km	MPC · JPL
354319	2002 VF_{139}	—	November 13, 2002	Palomar	NEAT	DOR	3.0 km	MPC · JPL
354320	2002 VG_{139}	—	November 13, 2002	Palomar	NEAT	·	2.4 km	MPC · JPL
354321	2002 VB_{144}	—	November 4, 2002	Palomar	NEAT	·	2.7 km	MPC · JPL
354322	2002 VA_{146}	—	November 5, 2002	Palomar	NEAT	·	1.8 km	MPC · JPL
354323	2002 VC_{147}	—	August 28, 2006	Anderson Mesa	LONEOS	AST	2.2 km	MPC · JPL
354324	2002 VF_{147}	—	October 3, 1997	Kitt Peak	Spacewatch	·	2.9 km	MPC · JPL
354325	2002 WM_{1}	—	November 23, 2002	Palomar	NEAT	·	2.0 km	MPC · JPL
354326	2002 WL_{3}	—	November 24, 2002	Palomar	NEAT	·	3.0 km	MPC · JPL
354327	2002 WO_{30}	—	November 24, 2002	Palomar	NEAT	AGN	1.3 km	MPC · JPL
354328	2002 WR_{31}	—	May 6, 2009	Siding Spring	SSS	·	3.9 km	MPC · JPL
354329	2002 XB_{12}	—	December 3, 2002	Palomar	NEAT	·	2.3 km	MPC · JPL
354330	2002 YL_{16}	—	December 31, 2002	Socorro	LINEAR	·	2.6 km	MPC · JPL
354331	2002 YP_{34}	—	December 31, 2002	Socorro	LINEAR	·	840 m	MPC · JPL
354332	2003 AD_{1}	—	January 2, 2003	Socorro	LINEAR	AMO +1km	790 m	MPC · JPL
354333	2003 AK_{4}	—	January 1, 2003	Needville	L. Castillo, W. G. Dillon	·	1.8 km	MPC · JPL
354334	2003 AR_{74}	—	January 10, 2003	Socorro	LINEAR	·	1.9 km	MPC · JPL
354335	2003 BC_{7}	—	January 25, 2003	Anderson Mesa	LONEOS	·	850 m	MPC · JPL
354336	2003 BW_{45}	—	January 30, 2003	Kitt Peak	Spacewatch	·	1.9 km	MPC · JPL
354337	2003 DV_{4}	—	February 22, 2003	Palomar	NEAT	·	1.9 km	MPC · JPL
354338	2003 EB_{4}	—	March 6, 2003	Socorro	LINEAR	H	530 m	MPC · JPL
354339	2003 EZ_{38}	—	March 8, 2003	Kitt Peak	Spacewatch	·	550 m	MPC · JPL
354340	2003 FM_{7}	—	March 29, 2003	Piszkéstető	K. Sárneczky	PHO	970 m	MPC · JPL
354341	2003 FW_{80}	—	March 27, 2003	Socorro	LINEAR	·	4.3 km	MPC · JPL
354342	2003 FB_{85}	—	January 15, 2001	Kitt Peak	Spacewatch	L4	10 km	MPC · JPL
354343	2003 FO_{90}	—	March 29, 2003	Anderson Mesa	LONEOS	·	1.2 km	MPC · JPL
354344	2003 FS_{96}	—	March 30, 2003	Kitt Peak	Spacewatch	·	790 m	MPC · JPL
354345	2003 FB_{101}	—	March 31, 2003	Anderson Mesa	LONEOS	·	780 m	MPC · JPL
354346	2003 FK_{103}	—	March 24, 2003	Kitt Peak	Spacewatch	·	810 m	MPC · JPL
354347	2003 FJ_{109}	—	March 31, 2003	Anderson Mesa	LONEOS	·	2.3 km	MPC · JPL
354348	2003 FL_{132}	—	March 24, 2003	Kitt Peak	Spacewatch	·	1.6 km	MPC · JPL
354349	2003 FN_{133}	—	March 27, 2003	Kitt Peak	Spacewatch	·	740 m	MPC · JPL
354350	2003 GE	—	April 1, 2003	Socorro	LINEAR	H	600 m	MPC · JPL
354351	2003 GY_{24}	—	April 7, 2003	Kitt Peak	Spacewatch	L4	12 km	MPC · JPL
354352	2003 GR_{28}	—	April 7, 2003	Uccle	T. Pauwels	·	850 m	MPC · JPL
354353	2003 GT_{48}	—	April 9, 2003	Socorro	LINEAR	EOS	2.1 km	MPC · JPL
354354	2003 GV_{53}	—	April 4, 2003	Kitt Peak	Spacewatch	L4	10 km	MPC · JPL
354355	2003 GT_{54}	—	April 3, 2003	Anderson Mesa	LONEOS	·	2.5 km	MPC · JPL
354356	2003 HU_{6}	—	April 24, 2003	Kitt Peak	Spacewatch	·	760 m	MPC · JPL
354357	2003 HT_{12}	—	April 24, 2003	Kitt Peak	Spacewatch	EOS	2.6 km	MPC · JPL
354358	2003 HQ_{15}	—	April 24, 2003	Socorro	LINEAR	PHO	2.2 km	MPC · JPL
354359	2003 HR_{34}	—	April 29, 2003	Kitt Peak	Spacewatch	·	4.0 km	MPC · JPL
354360	2003 HW_{50}	—	April 28, 2003	Socorro	LINEAR	·	1.2 km	MPC · JPL
354361	2003 HS_{58}	—	April 26, 2003	Apache Point	SDSS	PHO	850 m	MPC · JPL
354362	2003 KT_{1}	—	May 22, 2003	Kitt Peak	Spacewatch	·	3.1 km	MPC · JPL
354363	2003 KK_{13}	—	April 25, 2003	Kitt Peak	Spacewatch	·	4.5 km	MPC · JPL
354364	2003 KG_{25}	—	May 31, 2003	Cerro Tololo	M. W. Buie	L4	7.1 km	MPC · JPL
354365	2003 LX_{2}	—	June 4, 2003	Socorro	LINEAR	·	850 m	MPC · JPL
354366	2003 OV_{1}	—	July 22, 2003	Haleakala	NEAT	PHO	1.1 km	MPC · JPL
354367	2003 OY_{31}	—	July 25, 2003	Socorro	LINEAR	H	720 m	MPC · JPL
354368	2003 QS_{4}	—	August 19, 2003	Campo Imperatore	CINEOS	·	840 m	MPC · JPL
354369	2003 QX_{12}	—	August 22, 2003	Haleakala	NEAT	·	1.4 km	MPC · JPL
354370	2003 QS_{25}	—	August 22, 2003	Palomar	NEAT	·	1.1 km	MPC · JPL
354371	2003 QM_{40}	—	August 22, 2003	Haleakala	NEAT	·	1.9 km	MPC · JPL
354372	2003 QA_{58}	—	July 24, 2003	Palomar	NEAT	·	1.0 km	MPC · JPL
354373	2003 RX_{1}	—	September 1, 2003	Socorro	LINEAR	H	610 m	MPC · JPL
354374	2003 RR_{8}	—	September 7, 2003	Socorro	LINEAR	·	1.5 km	MPC · JPL
354375	2003 SO_{4}	—	September 16, 2003	Palomar	NEAT	·	1.5 km	MPC · JPL
354376	2003 SC_{16}	—	September 17, 2003	Kitt Peak	Spacewatch	·	1.8 km	MPC · JPL
354377	2003 SL_{29}	—	September 18, 2003	Palomar	NEAT	H	610 m	MPC · JPL
354378	2003 SR_{37}	—	September 16, 2003	Palomar	NEAT	·	1.1 km	MPC · JPL
354379	2003 SZ_{71}	—	September 18, 2003	Kitt Peak	Spacewatch	V	810 m	MPC · JPL
354380	2003 SK_{116}	—	September 16, 2003	Anderson Mesa	LONEOS	(5)	1.2 km	MPC · JPL
354381	2003 SR_{120}	—	September 17, 2003	Socorro	LINEAR	·	1.3 km	MPC · JPL
354382	2003 SH_{123}	—	September 18, 2003	Palomar	NEAT	·	1.1 km	MPC · JPL
354383	2003 SE_{149}	—	September 16, 2003	Kitt Peak	Spacewatch	·	1.0 km	MPC · JPL
354384	2003 SP_{170}	—	September 23, 2003	Palomar	NEAT	·	1.4 km	MPC · JPL
354385	2003 SR_{184}	—	September 21, 2003	Kitt Peak	Spacewatch	H	650 m	MPC · JPL
354386	2003 SG_{234}	—	September 25, 2003	Palomar	NEAT	·	1.2 km	MPC · JPL
354387	2003 SY_{261}	—	September 27, 2003	Kitt Peak	Spacewatch	·	990 m	MPC · JPL
354388	2003 SD_{268}	—	September 29, 2003	Kitt Peak	Spacewatch	·	1.5 km	MPC · JPL
354389	2003 ST_{301}	—	September 17, 2003	Palomar	NEAT	·	1.7 km	MPC · JPL
354390	2003 SM_{305}	—	September 17, 2003	Palomar	NEAT	H	640 m	MPC · JPL
354391	2003 SX_{323}	—	September 16, 2003	Kitt Peak	Spacewatch	·	1.4 km	MPC · JPL
354392	2003 SC_{326}	—	September 18, 2003	Kitt Peak	Spacewatch	NYS	1.3 km	MPC · JPL
354393	2003 SH_{328}	—	September 20, 2003	Kitt Peak	Spacewatch	V	740 m	MPC · JPL
354394	2003 SP_{332}	—	September 28, 2003	Apache Point	SDSS	·	1.2 km	MPC · JPL
354395	2003 SA_{380}	—	September 26, 2003	Apache Point	SDSS	MAS	850 m	MPC · JPL
354396	2003 TM_{36}	—	October 1, 2003	Kitt Peak	Spacewatch	·	1.5 km	MPC · JPL
354397	2003 TJ_{57}	—	October 5, 2003	Socorro	LINEAR	·	1.3 km	MPC · JPL
354398	2003 UD_{20}	—	October 18, 2003	Kitt Peak	Spacewatch	·	1.8 km	MPC · JPL
354399	2003 UZ_{30}	—	October 16, 2003	Kitt Peak	Spacewatch	·	1.3 km	MPC · JPL
354400	2003 UA_{66}	—	October 16, 2003	Palomar	NEAT	·	1.6 km	MPC · JPL

== 354401–354500 ==
back to top

Designation			Discovery			Properties		Ref
Permanent	Provisional	Named after	Date	Site	Discoverer(s)	Category	Diam.	Ref
354401	2003 UP_{77}	—	October 17, 2003	Kitt Peak	Spacewatch	·	1.2 km	MPC · JPL
354402	2003 UG_{108}	—	October 19, 2003	Kitt Peak	Spacewatch	(5)	1.2 km	MPC · JPL
354403	2003 UB_{150}	—	October 20, 2003	Socorro	LINEAR	·	1.2 km	MPC · JPL
354404	2003 UV_{158}	—	October 20, 2003	Kitt Peak	Spacewatch	·	1.4 km	MPC · JPL
354405	2003 UW_{166}	—	October 22, 2003	Kitt Peak	Spacewatch	·	1.3 km	MPC · JPL
354406	2003 UJ_{181}	—	October 21, 2003	Socorro	LINEAR	·	1.2 km	MPC · JPL
354407	2003 UP_{204}	—	October 21, 2003	Kitt Peak	Spacewatch	·	1.2 km	MPC · JPL
354408	2003 UR_{205}	—	October 22, 2003	Socorro	LINEAR	·	2.0 km	MPC · JPL
354409	2003 UB_{239}	—	October 24, 2003	Socorro	LINEAR	·	1.5 km	MPC · JPL
354410	2003 UH_{242}	—	October 24, 2003	Socorro	LINEAR	(5)	1.2 km	MPC · JPL
354411	2003 UB_{273}	—	October 29, 2003	Socorro	LINEAR	(5)	1.5 km	MPC · JPL
354412	2003 UX_{331}	—	October 18, 2003	Apache Point	SDSS	(5)	720 m	MPC · JPL
354413	2003 UU_{339}	—	October 18, 2003	Kitt Peak	Spacewatch	·	1.2 km	MPC · JPL
354414	2003 VA	—	November 1, 2003	Emerald Lane	L. Ball	·	1.5 km	MPC · JPL
354415	2003 VT_{11}	—	November 3, 2003	Socorro	LINEAR	·	1.4 km	MPC · JPL
354416	2003 WM_{1}	—	November 16, 2003	Catalina	CSS	·	1.4 km	MPC · JPL
354417	2003 WD_{10}	—	November 18, 2003	Kitt Peak	Spacewatch	BRG	1.6 km	MPC · JPL
354418	2003 WO_{12}	—	November 18, 2003	Kitt Peak	Spacewatch	·	1.7 km	MPC · JPL
354419	2003 WY_{21}	—	November 18, 2003	Palomar	NEAT	·	2.0 km	MPC · JPL
354420	2003 WX_{22}	—	November 18, 2003	Kitt Peak	Spacewatch	·	1.3 km	MPC · JPL
354421	2003 WR_{53}	—	November 20, 2003	Socorro	LINEAR	·	1.6 km	MPC · JPL
354422	2003 WW_{55}	—	November 20, 2003	Socorro	LINEAR	·	1.4 km	MPC · JPL
354423	2003 WC_{71}	—	November 20, 2003	Palomar	NEAT	·	1.6 km	MPC · JPL
354424	2003 WB_{75}	—	November 19, 2003	Anderson Mesa	LONEOS	·	1.7 km	MPC · JPL
354425	2003 WG_{84}	—	November 21, 2003	Kitt Peak	Spacewatch	·	1.5 km	MPC · JPL
354426	2003 WP_{84}	—	November 19, 2003	Socorro	LINEAR	(1547)	1.8 km	MPC · JPL
354427	2003 WN_{122}	—	November 20, 2003	Socorro	LINEAR	·	1.1 km	MPC · JPL
354428	2003 WH_{130}	—	November 21, 2003	Socorro	LINEAR	·	1.7 km	MPC · JPL
354429	2003 WB_{134}	—	November 21, 2003	Socorro	LINEAR	·	1.9 km	MPC · JPL
354430	2003 WU_{145}	—	November 21, 2003	Socorro	LINEAR	·	1.4 km	MPC · JPL
354431	2003 WU_{166}	—	November 18, 2003	Palomar	NEAT	BRG	1.4 km	MPC · JPL
354432	2003 WU_{192}	—	November 19, 2003	Anderson Mesa	LONEOS	·	1.4 km	MPC · JPL
354433	2003 XO_{12}	—	December 14, 2003	Palomar	NEAT	·	1.9 km	MPC · JPL
354434	2003 YL_{10}	—	December 17, 2003	Socorro	LINEAR	·	2.1 km	MPC · JPL
354435	2003 YA_{14}	—	December 17, 2003	Socorro	LINEAR	·	4.0 km	MPC · JPL
354436	2003 YW_{19}	—	December 17, 2003	Kitt Peak	Spacewatch	·	2.5 km	MPC · JPL
354437	2003 YW_{36}	—	December 17, 2003	Kitt Peak	Spacewatch	·	2.4 km	MPC · JPL
354438	2003 YN_{68}	—	December 19, 2003	Socorro	LINEAR	·	2.4 km	MPC · JPL
354439	2003 YS_{88}	—	December 19, 2003	Socorro	LINEAR	·	1.5 km	MPC · JPL
354440	2003 YG_{89}	—	December 19, 2003	Socorro	LINEAR	JUN	1.5 km	MPC · JPL
354441	2003 YX_{105}	—	December 22, 2003	Socorro	LINEAR	·	2.1 km	MPC · JPL
354442	2003 YS_{108}	—	December 22, 2003	Socorro	LINEAR	·	1.4 km	MPC · JPL
354443	2003 YE_{112}	—	December 23, 2003	Socorro	LINEAR	·	1.9 km	MPC · JPL
354444	2003 YN_{114}	—	December 25, 2003	Haleakala	NEAT	·	1.9 km	MPC · JPL
354445	2003 YG_{129}	—	December 27, 2003	Socorro	LINEAR	JUN	1.4 km	MPC · JPL
354446	2003 YT_{142}	—	December 28, 2003	Socorro	LINEAR	·	1.9 km	MPC · JPL
354447	2003 YB_{145}	—	December 28, 2003	Socorro	LINEAR	·	2.4 km	MPC · JPL
354448	2003 YP_{167}	—	December 18, 2003	Socorro	LINEAR	EUN	1.7 km	MPC · JPL
354449	2004 AQ_{23}	—	January 15, 2004	Kitt Peak	Spacewatch	·	1.4 km	MPC · JPL
354450	2004 BB_{7}	—	January 16, 2004	Kitt Peak	Spacewatch	·	1.6 km	MPC · JPL
354451	2004 BF_{10}	—	January 16, 2004	Palomar	NEAT	EUN	1.5 km	MPC · JPL
354452	2004 BM_{13}	—	January 17, 2004	Palomar	NEAT	·	2.5 km	MPC · JPL
354453	2004 BO_{16}	—	January 16, 2004	Palomar	NEAT	JUN	1.4 km	MPC · JPL
354454	2004 BC_{17}	—	January 17, 2004	Palomar	NEAT	·	1.6 km	MPC · JPL
354455	2004 BF_{25}	—	December 21, 2003	Kitt Peak	Spacewatch	·	1.9 km	MPC · JPL
354456	2004 BA_{28}	—	January 18, 2004	Palomar	NEAT	·	2.4 km	MPC · JPL
354457	2004 BH_{36}	—	January 19, 2004	Kitt Peak	Spacewatch	·	2.2 km	MPC · JPL
354458	2004 BY_{61}	—	January 22, 2004	Socorro	LINEAR	·	2.1 km	MPC · JPL
354459	2004 BW_{72}	—	January 24, 2004	Socorro	LINEAR	·	1.7 km	MPC · JPL
354460	2004 BO_{86}	—	December 27, 2003	Socorro	LINEAR	·	2.4 km	MPC · JPL
354461	2004 BV_{87}	—	January 23, 2004	Socorro	LINEAR	·	3.2 km	MPC · JPL
354462	2004 BT_{94}	—	January 28, 2004	Socorro	LINEAR	EUN	1.5 km	MPC · JPL
354463	2004 BE_{117}	—	January 28, 2004	Catalina	CSS	·	2.6 km	MPC · JPL
354464	2004 BU_{137}	—	January 19, 2004	Kitt Peak	Spacewatch	·	1.6 km	MPC · JPL
354465	2004 BF_{152}	—	December 29, 2003	Kitt Peak	Spacewatch	·	1.9 km	MPC · JPL
354466	2004 BF_{154}	—	January 28, 2004	Kitt Peak	Spacewatch	·	1.8 km	MPC · JPL
354467	2004 CZ_{52}	—	February 11, 2004	Kitt Peak	Spacewatch	JUN	1.2 km	MPC · JPL
354468	2004 CU_{55}	—	February 13, 2004	Palomar	NEAT	526	3.0 km	MPC · JPL
354469	2004 CT_{56}	—	February 9, 2004	Palomar	NEAT	EUN	1.6 km	MPC · JPL
354470	2004 CH_{57}	—	January 17, 2004	Palomar	NEAT	·	2.5 km	MPC · JPL
354471	2004 CT_{76}	—	January 17, 2004	Haleakala	NEAT	·	1.8 km	MPC · JPL
354472	2004 CZ_{82}	—	January 22, 2004	Socorro	LINEAR	GEF	1.4 km	MPC · JPL
354473	2004 CR_{93}	—	February 11, 2004	Palomar	NEAT	·	2.4 km	MPC · JPL
354474	2004 CE_{102}	—	February 12, 2004	Palomar	NEAT	·	2.6 km	MPC · JPL
354475	2004 CE_{103}	—	February 12, 2004	Palomar	NEAT	·	3.6 km	MPC · JPL
354476	2004 CS_{128}	—	February 14, 2004	Kitt Peak	Spacewatch	·	2.8 km	MPC · JPL
354477	2004 DM_{14}	—	February 16, 2004	Catalina	CSS	·	3.0 km	MPC · JPL
354478	2004 DT_{40}	—	February 18, 2004	Socorro	LINEAR	·	1.8 km	MPC · JPL
354479	2004 ES	—	January 27, 2004	Catalina	CSS	·	2.2 km	MPC · JPL
354480	2004 EY_{5}	—	March 11, 2004	Palomar	NEAT	·	4.3 km	MPC · JPL
354481	2004 ET_{12}	—	March 11, 2004	Palomar	NEAT	·	2.2 km	MPC · JPL
354482	2004 EV_{15}	—	March 12, 2004	Palomar	NEAT	·	2.2 km	MPC · JPL
354483	2004 EK_{25}	—	March 12, 2004	Palomar	NEAT	·	1.7 km	MPC · JPL
354484	2004 EB_{30}	—	March 15, 2004	Kitt Peak	Spacewatch	KOR	1.4 km	MPC · JPL
354485	2004 ES_{58}	—	March 15, 2004	Palomar	NEAT	·	2.3 km	MPC · JPL
354486	2004 ED_{75}	—	March 14, 2004	Kitt Peak	Spacewatch	·	2.3 km	MPC · JPL
354487	2004 EC_{76}	—	March 15, 2004	Socorro	LINEAR	·	3.0 km	MPC · JPL
354488	2004 EK_{82}	—	March 15, 2004	Socorro	LINEAR	·	2.5 km	MPC · JPL
354489	2004 FB_{13}	—	March 16, 2004	Catalina	CSS	·	2.6 km	MPC · JPL
354490	2004 FD_{32}	—	March 30, 2004	Socorro	LINEAR	·	2.0 km	MPC · JPL
354491	2004 FJ_{54}	—	March 18, 2004	Socorro	LINEAR	JUN	1.3 km	MPC · JPL
354492	2004 FQ_{119}	—	March 23, 2004	Socorro	LINEAR	·	1.8 km	MPC · JPL
354493	2004 FA_{124}	—	March 26, 2004	Catalina	CSS	·	3.3 km	MPC · JPL
354494	2004 FX_{158}	—	March 18, 2004	Palomar	NEAT	·	2.9 km	MPC · JPL
354495	2004 GX_{4}	—	April 11, 2004	Palomar	NEAT	·	2.0 km	MPC · JPL
354496	2004 JT_{9}	—	May 13, 2004	Kitt Peak	Spacewatch	EOS	2.2 km	MPC · JPL
354497	2004 JE_{54}	—	May 9, 2004	Kitt Peak	Spacewatch	·	4.4 km	MPC · JPL
354498	2004 KG_{6}	—	May 17, 2004	Socorro	LINEAR	·	2.1 km	MPC · JPL
354499	2004 NL_{19}	—	July 14, 2004	Socorro	LINEAR	·	840 m	MPC · JPL
354500	2004 OO_{14}	—	July 16, 2004	Cerro Tololo	Deep Ecliptic Survey	·	3.3 km	MPC · JPL

== 354501–354600 ==
back to top

Designation			Discovery			Properties		Ref
Permanent	Provisional	Named after	Date	Site	Discoverer(s)	Category	Diam.	Ref
354501	2004 PW_{5}	—	August 6, 2004	Palomar	NEAT	·	4.8 km	MPC · JPL
354502	2004 PN_{13}	—	August 7, 2004	Palomar	NEAT	·	780 m	MPC · JPL
354503	2004 PN_{16}	—	August 7, 2004	Palomar	NEAT	·	1.4 km	MPC · JPL
354504	2004 PY_{28}	—	August 6, 2004	Palomar	NEAT	·	1.4 km	MPC · JPL
354505	2004 PX_{37}	—	July 15, 2004	Socorro	LINEAR	·	1.1 km	MPC · JPL
354506	2004 PT_{45}	—	August 7, 2004	Siding Spring	SSS	·	780 m	MPC · JPL
354507	2004 PW_{48}	—	August 8, 2004	Socorro	LINEAR	NYS	990 m	MPC · JPL
354508	2004 PE_{57}	—	August 9, 2004	Socorro	LINEAR	·	3.7 km	MPC · JPL
354509	2004 PY_{61}	—	August 9, 2004	Socorro	LINEAR	·	1.1 km	MPC · JPL
354510	2004 PV_{66}	—	August 11, 2004	Palomar	NEAT	T_{j} (2.95)	8.0 km	MPC · JPL
354511	2004 PH_{114}	—	August 8, 2004	Socorro	LINEAR	·	720 m	MPC · JPL
354512	2004 QR_{8}	—	August 16, 2004	Siding Spring	SSS	·	6.0 km	MPC · JPL
354513	2004 QD_{25}	—	August 24, 2004	Socorro	LINEAR	PHO	3.6 km	MPC · JPL
354514	2004 RG_{5}	—	September 4, 2004	Palomar	NEAT	·	1.4 km	MPC · JPL
354515	2004 RX_{7}	—	September 6, 2004	St. Véran	St. Veran	·	1 km	MPC · JPL
354516	2004 RK_{44}	—	September 8, 2004	Socorro	LINEAR	·	2.8 km	MPC · JPL
354517	2004 RC_{46}	—	September 8, 2004	Socorro	LINEAR	·	3.7 km	MPC · JPL
354518	2004 RM_{47}	—	September 8, 2004	Socorro	LINEAR	·	1.0 km	MPC · JPL
354519	2004 RM_{51}	—	September 8, 2004	Socorro	LINEAR	MAS	680 m	MPC · JPL
354520	2004 RX_{53}	—	September 8, 2004	Socorro	LINEAR	NYS	1.1 km	MPC · JPL
354521	2004 RJ_{60}	—	September 8, 2004	Socorro	LINEAR	·	1.2 km	MPC · JPL
354522	2004 RV_{77}	—	September 8, 2004	Socorro	LINEAR	·	1.1 km	MPC · JPL
354523	2004 RF_{80}	—	September 7, 2004	Socorro	LINEAR	·	980 m	MPC · JPL
354524	2004 RP_{84}	—	August 25, 2004	Kitt Peak	Spacewatch	V	730 m	MPC · JPL
354525	2004 RZ_{90}	—	September 8, 2004	Socorro	LINEAR	·	870 m	MPC · JPL
354526	2004 RU_{99}	—	August 11, 2004	Socorro	LINEAR	·	800 m	MPC · JPL
354527	2004 RJ_{152}	—	September 10, 2004	Socorro	LINEAR	·	4.1 km	MPC · JPL
354528	2004 RZ_{157}	—	September 10, 2004	Socorro	LINEAR	·	5.6 km	MPC · JPL
354529	2004 RZ_{176}	—	September 10, 2004	Socorro	LINEAR	·	4.1 km	MPC · JPL
354530	2004 RG_{180}	—	September 10, 2004	Socorro	LINEAR	·	1.1 km	MPC · JPL
354531	2004 RT_{180}	—	September 10, 2004	Socorro	LINEAR	V	690 m	MPC · JPL
354532	2004 RH_{183}	—	September 10, 2004	Socorro	LINEAR	·	1.1 km	MPC · JPL
354533	2004 RB_{184}	—	September 10, 2004	Socorro	LINEAR	·	990 m	MPC · JPL
354534	2004 RU_{193}	—	September 10, 2004	Socorro	LINEAR	·	1.4 km	MPC · JPL
354535	2004 RB_{211}	—	September 11, 2004	Socorro	LINEAR	(22805)	5.3 km	MPC · JPL
354536	2004 RA_{218}	—	September 11, 2004	Socorro	LINEAR	·	2.3 km	MPC · JPL
354537	2004 RU_{223}	—	September 8, 2004	Socorro	LINEAR	V	600 m	MPC · JPL
354538	2004 RS_{229}	—	September 9, 2004	Kitt Peak	Spacewatch	NYS	1.1 km	MPC · JPL
354539	2004 RC_{239}	—	September 10, 2004	Kitt Peak	Spacewatch	·	650 m	MPC · JPL
354540	2004 RA_{250}	—	September 13, 2004	Socorro	LINEAR	·	860 m	MPC · JPL
354541	2004 RP_{251}	—	September 14, 2004	Siding Spring	SSS	H	600 m	MPC · JPL
354542	2004 RV_{256}	—	September 9, 2004	Socorro	LINEAR	·	1.0 km	MPC · JPL
354543	2004 RP_{265}	—	September 10, 2004	Kitt Peak	Spacewatch	THM	2.3 km	MPC · JPL
354544	2004 RY_{294}	—	September 11, 2004	Kitt Peak	Spacewatch	·	4.2 km	MPC · JPL
354545	2004 RE_{356}	—	September 14, 2004	Anderson Mesa	LONEOS	·	1.5 km	MPC · JPL
354546	2004 SM_{36}	—	September 17, 2004	Kitt Peak	Spacewatch	·	4.0 km	MPC · JPL
354547	2004 SE_{39}	—	September 17, 2004	Socorro	LINEAR	NYS	1.3 km	MPC · JPL
354548	2004 SO_{43}	—	September 18, 2004	Socorro	LINEAR	·	1.2 km	MPC · JPL
354549	2004 SZ_{53}	—	September 22, 2004	Socorro	LINEAR	·	1.0 km	MPC · JPL
354550	2004 SS_{54}	—	September 22, 2004	Socorro	LINEAR	·	1.5 km	MPC · JPL
354551	2004 TY_{12}	—	October 8, 2004	Goodricke-Pigott	R. A. Tucker	NYS	1.3 km	MPC · JPL
354552	2004 TD_{21}	—	October 11, 2004	Yamagata	Yamagata	·	1.1 km	MPC · JPL
354553	2004 TA_{24}	—	October 4, 2004	Kitt Peak	Spacewatch	·	1.1 km	MPC · JPL
354554	2004 TL_{33}	—	October 4, 2004	Kitt Peak	Spacewatch	·	1.2 km	MPC · JPL
354555	2004 TV_{36}	—	October 4, 2004	Kitt Peak	Spacewatch	NYS	1.2 km	MPC · JPL
354556	2004 TN_{54}	—	October 4, 2004	Kitt Peak	Spacewatch	NYS	990 m	MPC · JPL
354557	2004 TO_{59}	—	October 5, 2004	Kitt Peak	Spacewatch	MAS	750 m	MPC · JPL
354558	2004 TK_{70}	—	October 6, 2004	Anderson Mesa	LONEOS	·	1.2 km	MPC · JPL
354559	2004 TQ_{71}	—	October 6, 2004	Kitt Peak	Spacewatch	·	1.5 km	MPC · JPL
354560	2004 TK_{72}	—	October 6, 2004	Kitt Peak	Spacewatch	·	1.0 km	MPC · JPL
354561	2004 TQ_{75}	—	October 6, 2004	Palomar	NEAT	·	1.1 km	MPC · JPL
354562	2004 TJ_{86}	—	October 5, 2004	Kitt Peak	Spacewatch	NYS	1.1 km	MPC · JPL
354563	2004 TW_{90}	—	October 5, 2004	Kitt Peak	Spacewatch	NYS	1.2 km	MPC · JPL
354564	2004 TU_{92}	—	October 5, 2004	Kitt Peak	Spacewatch	V	830 m	MPC · JPL
354565	2004 TA_{98}	—	October 5, 2004	Kitt Peak	Spacewatch	V	700 m	MPC · JPL
354566	2004 TG_{107}	—	October 7, 2004	Socorro	LINEAR	MAS	850 m	MPC · JPL
354567	2004 TB_{110}	—	October 7, 2004	Socorro	LINEAR	·	1.4 km	MPC · JPL
354568	2004 TK_{121}	—	October 7, 2004	Anderson Mesa	LONEOS	MAS	840 m	MPC · JPL
354569	2004 TT_{133}	—	October 7, 2004	Palomar	NEAT	·	3.0 km	MPC · JPL
354570	2004 TA_{143}	—	September 7, 2004	Kitt Peak	Spacewatch	·	780 m	MPC · JPL
354571	2004 TN_{150}	—	October 6, 2004	Kitt Peak	Spacewatch	·	1.1 km	MPC · JPL
354572	2004 TJ_{181}	—	October 7, 2004	Kitt Peak	Spacewatch	·	3.5 km	MPC · JPL
354573	2004 TS_{202}	—	October 7, 2004	Kitt Peak	Spacewatch	·	1.3 km	MPC · JPL
354574	2004 TP_{275}	—	October 9, 2004	Kitt Peak	Spacewatch	·	940 m	MPC · JPL
354575	2004 TN_{279}	—	October 10, 2004	Palomar	NEAT	MAS	720 m	MPC · JPL
354576	2004 TA_{342}	—	October 13, 2004	Kitt Peak	Spacewatch	NYS	1.3 km	MPC · JPL
354577	2004 TW_{366}	—	October 10, 2004	Kitt Peak	M. W. Buie	·	1.1 km	MPC · JPL
354578	2004 TK_{367}	—	October 9, 2004	Socorro	LINEAR	·	1.3 km	MPC · JPL
354579	2004 VJ_{6}	—	November 3, 2004	Kitt Peak	Spacewatch	NYS	1.3 km	MPC · JPL
354580	2004 VX_{10}	—	November 3, 2004	Catalina	CSS	·	1.5 km	MPC · JPL
354581	2004 VW_{18}	—	November 4, 2004	Kitt Peak	Spacewatch	NYS	1.2 km	MPC · JPL
354582	2004 VT_{21}	—	November 4, 2004	Catalina	CSS	·	1.2 km	MPC · JPL
354583	2004 VX_{32}	—	November 3, 2004	Kitt Peak	Spacewatch	·	1.0 km	MPC · JPL
354584	2004 VP_{52}	—	November 4, 2004	Catalina	CSS	·	1.4 km	MPC · JPL
354585	2004 VA_{59}	—	November 9, 2004	Catalina	CSS	·	1.5 km	MPC · JPL
354586	2004 WY_{11}	—	November 19, 2004	Socorro	LINEAR	ERI	2.3 km	MPC · JPL
354587	2004 XE_{12}	—	December 8, 2004	Socorro	LINEAR	·	1.5 km	MPC · JPL
354588	2004 XU_{19}	—	December 8, 2004	Socorro	LINEAR	MAS	900 m	MPC · JPL
354589	2004 XW_{24}	—	December 9, 2004	Kitt Peak	Spacewatch	NYS	1.4 km	MPC · JPL
354590	2004 XW_{27}	—	December 10, 2004	Socorro	LINEAR	·	1.1 km	MPC · JPL
354591	2004 XT_{51}	—	December 10, 2004	Socorro	LINEAR	·	1.7 km	MPC · JPL
354592	2004 XS_{81}	—	December 10, 2004	Kitt Peak	Spacewatch	ADE	3.5 km	MPC · JPL
354593	2004 XJ_{104}	—	December 10, 2004	Socorro	LINEAR	MAS	810 m	MPC · JPL
354594	2004 YF_{8}	—	December 18, 2004	Mount Lemmon	Mount Lemmon Survey	·	1.2 km	MPC · JPL
354595	2004 YE_{15}	—	December 18, 2004	Mount Lemmon	Mount Lemmon Survey	·	1.2 km	MPC · JPL
354596	2004 YP_{29}	—	December 16, 2004	Kitt Peak	Spacewatch	·	1.3 km	MPC · JPL
354597	2005 AG_{3}	—	December 21, 2004	Catalina	CSS	H	700 m	MPC · JPL
354598	2005 AD_{20}	—	January 6, 2005	Socorro	LINEAR	EUN	1.9 km	MPC · JPL
354599	2005 AM_{23}	—	January 7, 2005	Socorro	LINEAR	(5)	1.6 km	MPC · JPL
354600	2005 AT_{38}	—	January 13, 2005	Catalina	CSS	·	1.9 km	MPC · JPL

== 354601–354700 ==
back to top

Designation			Discovery			Properties		Ref
Permanent	Provisional	Named after	Date	Site	Discoverer(s)	Category	Diam.	Ref
354601	2005 AN_{75}	—	January 15, 2005	Kitt Peak	Spacewatch	·	1.6 km	MPC · JPL
354602	2005 AH_{81}	—	January 15, 2005	Catalina	CSS	H	680 m	MPC · JPL
354603	2005 BU_{12}	—	January 17, 2005	Socorro	LINEAR	NYS	1.2 km	MPC · JPL
354604	2005 CG_{8}	—	February 1, 2005	Catalina	CSS	·	1.3 km	MPC · JPL
354605	2005 CA_{25}	—	February 4, 2005	Catalina	CSS	·	2.1 km	MPC · JPL
354606	2005 CS_{25}	—	February 1, 2005	Goodricke-Pigott	R. A. Tucker	H	660 m	MPC · JPL
354607	2005 CT_{40}	—	February 9, 2005	La Silla	A. Boattini, H. Scholl	·	1.0 km	MPC · JPL
354608	2005 CB_{74}	—	February 1, 2005	Kitt Peak	Spacewatch	·	2.4 km	MPC · JPL
354609	2005 EW_{24}	—	March 3, 2005	Catalina	CSS	H	990 m	MPC · JPL
354610	2005 EN_{33}	—	March 4, 2005	Socorro	LINEAR	H	650 m	MPC · JPL
354611	2005 EC_{47}	—	March 3, 2005	Kitt Peak	Spacewatch	·	1.4 km	MPC · JPL
354612	2005 EL_{51}	—	March 3, 2005	Catalina	CSS	·	1.3 km	MPC · JPL
354613	2005 EE_{70}	—	March 7, 2005	Socorro	LINEAR	·	2.0 km	MPC · JPL
354614	2005 EA_{79}	—	March 3, 2005	Catalina	CSS	H	590 m	MPC · JPL
354615	2005 EY_{89}	—	March 8, 2005	Socorro	LINEAR	·	1.5 km	MPC · JPL
354616	2005 EL_{93}	—	March 8, 2005	Mount Lemmon	Mount Lemmon Survey	·	1.3 km	MPC · JPL
354617	2005 EV_{109}	—	March 4, 2005	Mount Lemmon	Mount Lemmon Survey	·	1.2 km	MPC · JPL
354618	2005 EM_{125}	—	March 8, 2005	Mount Lemmon	Mount Lemmon Survey	MIS	1.9 km	MPC · JPL
354619	2005 EZ_{126}	—	March 9, 2005	Kitt Peak	Spacewatch	·	1.3 km	MPC · JPL
354620	2005 EO_{143}	—	March 10, 2005	Mount Lemmon	Mount Lemmon Survey	·	790 m	MPC · JPL
354621	2005 EE_{144}	—	March 10, 2005	Mount Lemmon	Mount Lemmon Survey	·	890 m	MPC · JPL
354622	2005 EN_{157}	—	March 9, 2005	Mount Lemmon	Mount Lemmon Survey	·	1.2 km	MPC · JPL
354623	2005 EC_{175}	—	March 8, 2005	Kitt Peak	Spacewatch	·	1.3 km	MPC · JPL
354624	2005 EL_{181}	—	March 9, 2005	Anderson Mesa	LONEOS	·	1.4 km	MPC · JPL
354625	2005 EV_{184}	—	March 9, 2005	Kitt Peak	Spacewatch	·	1.6 km	MPC · JPL
354626	2005 EY_{235}	—	March 10, 2005	Mount Lemmon	Mount Lemmon Survey	3:2 · SHU	5.7 km	MPC · JPL
354627	2005 EO_{250}	—	March 12, 2005	Socorro	LINEAR	BAR	1.6 km	MPC · JPL
354628	2005 ET_{251}	—	March 10, 2005	Catalina	CSS	H	830 m	MPC · JPL
354629	2005 EY_{311}	—	March 10, 2005	Mount Lemmon	Mount Lemmon Survey	·	940 m	MPC · JPL
354630	2005 FR_{1}	—	March 16, 2005	Socorro	LINEAR	·	1.2 km	MPC · JPL
354631	2005 GD_{24}	—	April 2, 2005	Mount Lemmon	Mount Lemmon Survey	·	930 m	MPC · JPL
354632	2005 GJ_{43}	—	April 5, 2005	Palomar	NEAT	·	2.0 km	MPC · JPL
354633	2005 GD_{53}	—	April 2, 2005	Mount Lemmon	Mount Lemmon Survey	EUN	1.5 km	MPC · JPL
354634	2005 GK_{53}	—	April 2, 2005	Mount Lemmon	Mount Lemmon Survey	(5)	1.3 km	MPC · JPL
354635	2005 GA_{55}	—	April 5, 2005	Mount Lemmon	Mount Lemmon Survey	(5)	1.3 km	MPC · JPL
354636	2005 GJ_{64}	—	March 15, 2005	Catalina	CSS	·	1.8 km	MPC · JPL
354637	2005 GX_{64}	—	April 2, 2005	Catalina	CSS	MAR	1.3 km	MPC · JPL
354638	2005 GT_{78}	—	April 6, 2005	Catalina	CSS	·	2.6 km	MPC · JPL
354639	2005 GX_{90}	—	April 6, 2005	Kitt Peak	Spacewatch	·	1.5 km	MPC · JPL
354640	2005 GC_{91}	—	April 6, 2005	Kitt Peak	Spacewatch	·	1.6 km	MPC · JPL
354641	2005 GP_{95}	—	April 6, 2005	Kitt Peak	Spacewatch	·	1.3 km	MPC · JPL
354642	2005 GG_{102}	—	April 9, 2005	Kitt Peak	Spacewatch	·	2.0 km	MPC · JPL
354643	2005 GP_{218}	—	April 2, 2005	Mount Lemmon	Mount Lemmon Survey	·	950 m	MPC · JPL
354644	2005 HH_{8}	—	April 30, 2005	Catalina	CSS	H	660 m	MPC · JPL
354645	2005 JO_{8}	—	May 4, 2005	Mauna Kea	Veillet, C.	·	1.4 km	MPC · JPL
354646	2005 JW_{20}	—	May 4, 2005	Catalina	CSS	·	2.1 km	MPC · JPL
354647	2005 JD_{27}	—	May 3, 2005	Kitt Peak	Spacewatch	(13314)	2.0 km	MPC · JPL
354648	2005 JT_{30}	—	May 4, 2005	Kitt Peak	Spacewatch	·	1.8 km	MPC · JPL
354649	2005 JJ_{44}	—	May 7, 2005	Mount Lemmon	Mount Lemmon Survey	·	2.3 km	MPC · JPL
354650	2005 JR_{45}	—	May 3, 2005	Kitt Peak	Deep Lens Survey	HNS	1.5 km	MPC · JPL
354651	2005 JG_{100}	—	May 9, 2005	Kitt Peak	Spacewatch	·	2.1 km	MPC · JPL
354652	2005 JY_{103}	—	May 10, 2005	Mount Lemmon	Mount Lemmon Survey	·	2.1 km	MPC · JPL
354653	2005 JV_{129}	—	May 13, 2005	Kitt Peak	Spacewatch	·	2.6 km	MPC · JPL
354654	2005 JB_{131}	—	May 13, 2005	Kitt Peak	Spacewatch	·	2.0 km	MPC · JPL
354655	2005 JM_{147}	—	May 15, 2005	Palomar	NEAT	·	2.2 km	MPC · JPL
354656	2005 JX_{147}	—	May 15, 2005	Palomar	NEAT	·	1.5 km	MPC · JPL
354657	2005 JT_{157}	—	May 4, 2005	Palomar	NEAT	·	2.1 km	MPC · JPL
354658	2005 JV_{162}	—	May 8, 2005	Mount Lemmon	Mount Lemmon Survey	·	1.5 km	MPC · JPL
354659 Boileau	2005 KC_{10}	Boileau	May 30, 2005	Saint-Sulpice	Saint-Sulpice	GEF	1.4 km	MPC · JPL
354660	2005 LN_{9}	—	June 1, 2005	Kitt Peak	Spacewatch	·	2.4 km	MPC · JPL
354661	2005 LV_{10}	—	June 3, 2005	Kitt Peak	Spacewatch	·	2.1 km	MPC · JPL
354662	2005 LX_{17}	—	June 6, 2005	Kitt Peak	Spacewatch	·	2.0 km	MPC · JPL
354663	2005 LY_{19}	—	June 9, 2005	Siding Spring	SSS	AMO +1km	2.0 km	MPC · JPL
354664	2005 LE_{23}	—	June 8, 2005	Kitt Peak	Spacewatch	·	2.7 km	MPC · JPL
354665	2005 LQ_{47}	—	June 14, 2005	Kitt Peak	Spacewatch	·	2.6 km	MPC · JPL
354666	2005 MD_{17}	—	June 27, 2005	Kitt Peak	Spacewatch	·	2.1 km	MPC · JPL
354667	2005 MO_{17}	—	June 27, 2005	Kitt Peak	Spacewatch	·	3.0 km	MPC · JPL
354668	2005 MA_{29}	—	June 29, 2005	Kitt Peak	Spacewatch	·	4.8 km	MPC · JPL
354669	2005 NL_{6}	—	July 4, 2005	Mount Lemmon	Mount Lemmon Survey	·	2.3 km	MPC · JPL
354670	2005 NX_{7}	—	July 1, 2005	Kitt Peak	Spacewatch	·	2.3 km	MPC · JPL
354671	2005 NB_{17}	—	June 3, 2005	Siding Spring	SSS	·	2.3 km	MPC · JPL
354672	2005 NT_{18}	—	July 4, 2005	Mount Lemmon	Mount Lemmon Survey	·	1.6 km	MPC · JPL
354673	2005 NW_{49}	—	July 4, 2005	Mount Lemmon	Mount Lemmon Survey	·	950 m	MPC · JPL
354674	2005 ND_{53}	—	July 10, 2005	Kitt Peak	Spacewatch	·	2.7 km	MPC · JPL
354675	2005 NM_{56}	—	July 5, 2005	Kitt Peak	Spacewatch	·	1.1 km	MPC · JPL
354676	2005 NH_{71}	—	July 5, 2005	Kitt Peak	Spacewatch	EOS	1.9 km	MPC · JPL
354677	2005 NH_{72}	—	July 6, 2005	Kitt Peak	Spacewatch	·	2.2 km	MPC · JPL
354678	2005 NB_{102}	—	July 15, 2005	Mount Lemmon	Mount Lemmon Survey	·	2.5 km	MPC · JPL
354679	2005 OQ_{3}	—	July 28, 2005	Reedy Creek	J. Broughton	·	2.8 km	MPC · JPL
354680	2005 OD_{9}	—	July 26, 2005	Palomar	NEAT	EOS	1.9 km	MPC · JPL
354681	2005 OP_{17}	—	July 30, 2005	Palomar	NEAT	T_{j} (2.99)	4.2 km	MPC · JPL
354682	2005 OC_{27}	—	July 31, 2005	Palomar	NEAT	TIR	3.4 km	MPC · JPL
354683	2005 PM_{4}	—	August 7, 2005	Siding Spring	SSS	·	1.9 km	MPC · JPL
354684	2005 PM_{9}	—	July 11, 2005	Mount Lemmon	Mount Lemmon Survey	·	2.4 km	MPC · JPL
354685	2005 PB_{19}	—	August 2, 2005	Campo Imperatore	CINEOS	·	3.6 km	MPC · JPL
354686	2005 PV_{23}	—	August 6, 2005	Palomar	NEAT	·	2.2 km	MPC · JPL
354687	2005 QK_{1}	—	July 30, 2005	Palomar	NEAT	·	3.4 km	MPC · JPL
354688	2005 QY_{11}	—	August 24, 2005	Palomar	NEAT	·	2.9 km	MPC · JPL
354689	2005 QV_{22}	—	August 27, 2005	Kitt Peak	Spacewatch	·	3.4 km	MPC · JPL
354690	2005 QY_{35}	—	August 25, 2005	Palomar	NEAT	TIR	4.0 km	MPC · JPL
354691	2005 QS_{64}	—	August 26, 2005	Anderson Mesa	LONEOS	·	2.9 km	MPC · JPL
354692	2005 QE_{86}	—	August 30, 2005	Kitt Peak	Spacewatch	·	3.9 km	MPC · JPL
354693	2005 QR_{97}	—	August 27, 2005	Palomar	NEAT	·	3.6 km	MPC · JPL
354694	2005 QE_{101}	—	August 30, 2005	Kitt Peak	Spacewatch	·	3.5 km	MPC · JPL
354695	2005 QR_{103}	—	August 27, 2005	Palomar	NEAT	·	2.4 km	MPC · JPL
354696	2005 QB_{117}	—	August 28, 2005	Kitt Peak	Spacewatch	DOR	3.0 km	MPC · JPL
354697	2005 QN_{153}	—	August 27, 2005	Anderson Mesa	LONEOS	·	3.9 km	MPC · JPL
354698	2005 QS_{175}	—	August 31, 2005	Palomar	NEAT	EOS	2.1 km	MPC · JPL
354699	2005 QV_{175}	—	August 31, 2005	Palomar	NEAT	EOS	2.4 km	MPC · JPL
354700	2005 QG_{188}	—	August 30, 2005	Kitt Peak	Spacewatch	·	3.5 km	MPC · JPL

== 354701–354800 ==
back to top

Designation			Discovery			Properties		Ref
Permanent	Provisional	Named after	Date	Site	Discoverer(s)	Category	Diam.	Ref
354701	2005 QV_{189}	—	August 29, 2005	Kitt Peak	Spacewatch	·	4.0 km	MPC · JPL
354702	2005 QW_{189}	—	August 30, 2005	Kitt Peak	Spacewatch	VER	2.6 km	MPC · JPL
354703	2005 RS_{11}	—	September 11, 2005	Junk Bond	D. Healy	EOS	2.5 km	MPC · JPL
354704	2005 RK_{22}	—	September 10, 2005	Anderson Mesa	LONEOS	·	3.4 km	MPC · JPL
354705	2005 RC_{27}	—	September 10, 2005	Anderson Mesa	LONEOS	·	3.8 km	MPC · JPL
354706	2005 RO_{29}	—	September 12, 2005	Anderson Mesa	LONEOS	EUP	5.6 km	MPC · JPL
354707	2005 RJ_{34}	—	September 10, 2005	Kingsnake	J. V. McClusky	·	700 m	MPC · JPL
354708	2005 RG_{41}	—	September 13, 2005	Kitt Peak	Spacewatch	EOS	2.2 km	MPC · JPL
354709	2005 RV_{45}	—	September 14, 2005	Apache Point	A. C. Becker	·	3.3 km	MPC · JPL
354710	2005 RP_{47}	—	September 13, 2005	Apache Point	A. C. Becker	EOS	2.2 km	MPC · JPL
354711	2005 SZ_{14}	—	September 26, 2005	Kitt Peak	Spacewatch	·	3.2 km	MPC · JPL
354712	2005 SF_{18}	—	September 26, 2005	Kitt Peak	Spacewatch	·	2.8 km	MPC · JPL
354713	2005 SG_{19}	—	September 26, 2005	Kitt Peak	Spacewatch	AMO +1km	1.5 km	MPC · JPL
354714	2005 SU_{19}	—	September 24, 2005	Piszkéstető	K. Sárneczky	·	2.8 km	MPC · JPL
354715	2005 SY_{41}	—	September 24, 2005	Kitt Peak	Spacewatch	·	3.2 km	MPC · JPL
354716	2005 SV_{49}	—	September 24, 2005	Kitt Peak	Spacewatch	·	790 m	MPC · JPL
354717	2005 SN_{61}	—	September 26, 2005	Kitt Peak	Spacewatch	·	3.3 km	MPC · JPL
354718	2005 SS_{100}	—	September 25, 2005	Kitt Peak	Spacewatch	·	710 m	MPC · JPL
354719	2005 SY_{106}	—	September 26, 2005	Catalina	CSS	·	3.4 km	MPC · JPL
354720	2005 SY_{116}	—	September 28, 2005	Palomar	NEAT	·	2.8 km	MPC · JPL
354721	2005 SU_{122}	—	September 3, 2005	Catalina	CSS	ARM	4.0 km	MPC · JPL
354722	2005 SC_{145}	—	September 25, 2005	Kitt Peak	Spacewatch	·	1.7 km	MPC · JPL
354723	2005 SQ_{145}	—	September 25, 2005	Kitt Peak	Spacewatch	(43176)	3.6 km	MPC · JPL
354724	2005 SX_{155}	—	September 26, 2005	Kitt Peak	Spacewatch	EOS	2.0 km	MPC · JPL
354725	2005 SZ_{161}	—	September 27, 2005	Kitt Peak	Spacewatch	·	2.7 km	MPC · JPL
354726	2005 SQ_{166}	—	September 28, 2005	Palomar	NEAT	·	6.2 km	MPC · JPL
354727	2005 SZ_{170}	—	September 29, 2005	Kitt Peak	Spacewatch	·	2.9 km	MPC · JPL
354728	2005 SX_{192}	—	September 29, 2005	Kitt Peak	Spacewatch	·	6.6 km	MPC · JPL
354729	2005 SE_{193}	—	September 29, 2005	Catalina	CSS	·	900 m	MPC · JPL
354730	2005 SA_{194}	—	September 29, 2005	Kitt Peak	Spacewatch	VER	3.6 km	MPC · JPL
354731	2005 SR_{195}	—	September 30, 2005	Kitt Peak	Spacewatch	·	3.2 km	MPC · JPL
354732	2005 SK_{219}	—	September 30, 2005	Palomar	NEAT	·	790 m	MPC · JPL
354733	2005 SB_{229}	—	September 30, 2005	Mount Lemmon	Mount Lemmon Survey	·	3.5 km	MPC · JPL
354734	2005 SO_{230}	—	September 30, 2005	Mount Lemmon	Mount Lemmon Survey	·	3.9 km	MPC · JPL
354735	2005 SE_{232}	—	September 30, 2005	Mount Lemmon	Mount Lemmon Survey	·	570 m	MPC · JPL
354736	2005 SW_{254}	—	September 14, 2005	Kitt Peak	Spacewatch	EOS	2.5 km	MPC · JPL
354737	2005 SQ_{279}	—	September 23, 2005	Kitt Peak	Spacewatch	THM	2.1 km	MPC · JPL
354738	2005 SV_{287}	—	October 1, 2005	Apache Point	SDSS Collaboration	·	3.5 km	MPC · JPL
354739	2005 SQ_{288}	—	September 27, 2005	Apache Point	A. C. Becker	·	2.3 km	MPC · JPL
354740	2005 TA_{2}	—	October 1, 2005	Mount Lemmon	Mount Lemmon Survey	·	3.6 km	MPC · JPL
354741	2005 TA_{16}	—	October 1, 2005	Kitt Peak	Spacewatch	EOS	1.8 km	MPC · JPL
354742	2005 TZ_{65}	—	September 26, 2005	Palomar	NEAT	·	3.6 km	MPC · JPL
354743	2005 TU_{68}	—	October 6, 2005	Kitt Peak	Spacewatch	·	2.6 km	MPC · JPL
354744	2005 TT_{79}	—	September 10, 2005	Anderson Mesa	LONEOS	·	3.6 km	MPC · JPL
354745	2005 TV_{82}	—	October 3, 2005	Socorro	LINEAR	·	830 m	MPC · JPL
354746	2005 TM_{90}	—	October 6, 2005	Kitt Peak	Spacewatch	·	2.7 km	MPC · JPL
354747	2005 TO_{100}	—	October 7, 2005	Mount Lemmon	Mount Lemmon Survey	·	2.8 km	MPC · JPL
354748	2005 TW_{104}	—	October 8, 2005	Socorro	LINEAR	·	760 m	MPC · JPL
354749	2005 TR_{123}	—	October 7, 2005	Kitt Peak	Spacewatch	·	2.6 km	MPC · JPL
354750	2005 TB_{148}	—	October 8, 2005	Kitt Peak	Spacewatch	·	2.5 km	MPC · JPL
354751	2005 TU_{148}	—	October 8, 2005	Kitt Peak	Spacewatch	VER	2.4 km	MPC · JPL
354752	2005 TU_{156}	—	October 9, 2005	Kitt Peak	Spacewatch	·	2.4 km	MPC · JPL
354753	2005 TO_{157}	—	October 9, 2005	Kitt Peak	Spacewatch	·	2.9 km	MPC · JPL
354754	2005 TQ_{159}	—	October 9, 2005	Kitt Peak	Spacewatch	HYG	3.3 km	MPC · JPL
354755	2005 TV_{163}	—	October 9, 2005	Kitt Peak	Spacewatch	·	3.7 km	MPC · JPL
354756	2005 TL_{177}	—	October 3, 2005	Catalina	CSS	EOS	2.8 km	MPC · JPL
354757	2005 TE_{196}	—	October 9, 2005	Kitt Peak	Spacewatch	·	2.4 km	MPC · JPL
354758	2005 UB_{8}	—	October 26, 2005	Ottmarsheim	C. Rinner	EOS	4.8 km	MPC · JPL
354759	2005 UC_{50}	—	October 23, 2005	Catalina	CSS	·	860 m	MPC · JPL
354760	2005 UG_{54}	—	October 23, 2005	Catalina	CSS	·	970 m	MPC · JPL
354761	2005 UO_{57}	—	September 24, 2005	Kitt Peak	Spacewatch	·	3.6 km	MPC · JPL
354762	2005 UW_{67}	—	October 22, 2005	Palomar	NEAT	·	730 m	MPC · JPL
354763	2005 UA_{69}	—	October 23, 2005	Palomar	NEAT	·	920 m	MPC · JPL
354764	2005 UQ_{69}	—	October 23, 2005	Palomar	NEAT	·	710 m	MPC · JPL
354765	2005 UZ_{69}	—	September 29, 2005	Catalina	CSS	TIR	4.6 km	MPC · JPL
354766	2005 UP_{72}	—	October 23, 2005	Palomar	NEAT	·	810 m	MPC · JPL
354767	2005 UE_{81}	—	October 31, 2005	Mayhill	Guido, E.	·	700 m	MPC · JPL
354768	2005 UR_{84}	—	October 22, 2005	Kitt Peak	Spacewatch	·	4.3 km	MPC · JPL
354769	2005 UJ_{92}	—	October 22, 2005	Kitt Peak	Spacewatch	URS	5.7 km	MPC · JPL
354770	2005 US_{92}	—	October 22, 2005	Kitt Peak	Spacewatch	·	2.9 km	MPC · JPL
354771	2005 UE_{94}	—	October 22, 2005	Kitt Peak	Spacewatch	(1298)	3.6 km	MPC · JPL
354772	2005 UX_{109}	—	October 22, 2005	Kitt Peak	Spacewatch	·	710 m	MPC · JPL
354773	2005 UV_{112}	—	October 22, 2005	Kitt Peak	Spacewatch	·	600 m	MPC · JPL
354774	2005 US_{117}	—	October 24, 2005	Kitt Peak	Spacewatch	·	560 m	MPC · JPL
354775	2005 UB_{123}	—	October 24, 2005	Kitt Peak	Spacewatch	·	2.4 km	MPC · JPL
354776	2005 UK_{125}	—	October 24, 2005	Kitt Peak	Spacewatch	·	3.8 km	MPC · JPL
354777	2005 US_{142}	—	October 25, 2005	Mount Lemmon	Mount Lemmon Survey	·	660 m	MPC · JPL
354778	2005 UA_{155}	—	October 26, 2005	Kitt Peak	Spacewatch	·	530 m	MPC · JPL
354779	2005 UW_{156}	—	October 24, 2005	Kitt Peak	Spacewatch	EOS	2.3 km	MPC · JPL
354780	2005 UO_{165}	—	October 24, 2005	Kitt Peak	Spacewatch	·	2.7 km	MPC · JPL
354781	2005 UH_{170}	—	October 24, 2005	Kitt Peak	Spacewatch	·	2.9 km	MPC · JPL
354782	2005 UO_{181}	—	October 24, 2005	Kitt Peak	Spacewatch	·	670 m	MPC · JPL
354783	2005 UP_{202}	—	October 25, 2005	Kitt Peak	Spacewatch	·	3.2 km	MPC · JPL
354784	2005 UO_{220}	—	October 25, 2005	Kitt Peak	Spacewatch	·	840 m	MPC · JPL
354785	2005 UV_{252}	—	October 26, 2005	Kitt Peak	Spacewatch	·	4.6 km	MPC · JPL
354786	2005 UY_{254}	—	October 23, 2005	Palomar	NEAT	·	3.6 km	MPC · JPL
354787	2005 UG_{259}	—	October 25, 2005	Kitt Peak	Spacewatch	·	3.9 km	MPC · JPL
354788	2005 UR_{260}	—	October 25, 2005	Kitt Peak	Spacewatch	·	690 m	MPC · JPL
354789	2005 UJ_{277}	—	October 24, 2005	Kitt Peak	Spacewatch	·	690 m	MPC · JPL
354790	2005 UX_{299}	—	October 26, 2005	Kitt Peak	Spacewatch	·	3.3 km	MPC · JPL
354791	2005 UK_{314}	—	October 28, 2005	Catalina	CSS	·	3.0 km	MPC · JPL
354792	2005 UZ_{321}	—	October 27, 2005	Kitt Peak	Spacewatch	·	860 m	MPC · JPL
354793	2005 UK_{446}	—	October 29, 2005	Catalina	CSS	·	3.0 km	MPC · JPL
354794	2005 UJ_{473}	—	October 30, 2005	Mount Lemmon	Mount Lemmon Survey	·	700 m	MPC · JPL
354795	2005 UH_{486}	—	October 23, 2005	Kitt Peak	Spacewatch	·	3.1 km	MPC · JPL
354796	2005 UY_{516}	—	October 25, 2005	Apache Point	A. C. Becker	·	2.6 km	MPC · JPL
354797	2005 UX_{517}	—	October 25, 2005	Apache Point	A. C. Becker	VER	2.6 km	MPC · JPL
354798	2005 UN_{518}	—	October 25, 2005	Apache Point	A. C. Becker	·	3.9 km	MPC · JPL
354799	2005 UY_{519}	—	October 26, 2005	Apache Point	A. C. Becker	·	1.9 km	MPC · JPL
354800	2005 UF_{520}	—	October 26, 2005	Apache Point	A. C. Becker	·	4.6 km	MPC · JPL

== 354801–354900 ==
back to top

Designation			Discovery			Properties		Ref
Permanent	Provisional	Named after	Date	Site	Discoverer(s)	Category	Diam.	Ref
354801	2005 UH_{524}	—	October 27, 2005	Apache Point	A. C. Becker	·	3.2 km	MPC · JPL
354802	2005 UB_{525}	—	February 27, 2008	Kitt Peak	Spacewatch	·	4.1 km	MPC · JPL
354803	2005 VZ_{25}	—	November 2, 2005	Mount Lemmon	Mount Lemmon Survey	(1298)	3.1 km	MPC · JPL
354804	2005 VJ_{81}	—	November 5, 2005	Kitt Peak	Spacewatch	·	860 m	MPC · JPL
354805	2005 VM_{95}	—	November 6, 2005	Kitt Peak	Spacewatch	·	630 m	MPC · JPL
354806	2005 VA_{101}	—	November 1, 2005	Kitt Peak	Spacewatch	·	4.0 km	MPC · JPL
354807	2005 VQ_{120}	—	November 4, 2005	Catalina	CSS	(895)	6.7 km	MPC · JPL
354808	2005 VU_{120}	—	November 5, 2005	Catalina	CSS	·	3.8 km	MPC · JPL
354809	2005 VT_{131}	—	November 1, 2005	Apache Point	A. C. Becker	·	2.7 km	MPC · JPL
354810	2005 VY_{132}	—	November 1, 2005	Apache Point	A. C. Becker	EOS	2.0 km	MPC · JPL
354811	2005 WT_{6}	—	November 21, 2005	Kitt Peak	Spacewatch	·	600 m	MPC · JPL
354812	2005 WQ_{20}	—	November 21, 2005	Kitt Peak	Spacewatch	·	750 m	MPC · JPL
354813	2005 WC_{21}	—	October 30, 2005	Mount Lemmon	Mount Lemmon Survey	·	890 m	MPC · JPL
354814	2005 WL_{25}	—	November 21, 2005	Kitt Peak	Spacewatch	·	630 m	MPC · JPL
354815	2005 WK_{28}	—	November 21, 2005	Kitt Peak	Spacewatch	·	4.3 km	MPC · JPL
354816	2005 WA_{30}	—	November 6, 2005	Mount Lemmon	Mount Lemmon Survey	CYB	4.0 km	MPC · JPL
354817	2005 WF_{76}	—	November 25, 2005	Kitt Peak	Spacewatch	·	3.9 km	MPC · JPL
354818	2005 WP_{78}	—	November 25, 2005	Kitt Peak	Spacewatch	·	820 m	MPC · JPL
354819	2005 WL_{89}	—	November 26, 2005	Kitt Peak	Spacewatch	·	970 m	MPC · JPL
354820	2005 WR_{97}	—	November 26, 2005	Mount Lemmon	Mount Lemmon Survey	·	970 m	MPC · JPL
354821	2005 WG_{102}	—	November 29, 2005	Socorro	LINEAR	·	810 m	MPC · JPL
354822	2005 WS_{103}	—	November 27, 2005	Anderson Mesa	LONEOS	PHO	1.2 km	MPC · JPL
354823	2005 WM_{119}	—	November 28, 2005	Socorro	LINEAR	·	1.0 km	MPC · JPL
354824	2005 WK_{135}	—	November 25, 2005	Mount Lemmon	Mount Lemmon Survey	·	770 m	MPC · JPL
354825	2005 WK_{159}	—	November 29, 2005	Catalina	CSS	CYB	3.3 km	MPC · JPL
354826	2005 WE_{175}	—	November 30, 2005	Kitt Peak	Spacewatch	·	830 m	MPC · JPL
354827	2005 WN_{197}	—	November 21, 2005	Kitt Peak	Spacewatch	·	870 m	MPC · JPL
354828	2005 XG_{2}	—	December 1, 2005	Mount Lemmon	Mount Lemmon Survey	·	4.4 km	MPC · JPL
354829	2005 XV_{15}	—	December 1, 2005	Mount Lemmon	Mount Lemmon Survey	·	2.9 km	MPC · JPL
354830	2005 XG_{20}	—	December 2, 2005	Kitt Peak	Spacewatch	·	710 m	MPC · JPL
354831	2005 XP_{24}	—	December 2, 2005	Mount Lemmon	Mount Lemmon Survey	·	670 m	MPC · JPL
354832	2005 XX_{35}	—	December 4, 2005	Socorro	LINEAR	·	870 m	MPC · JPL
354833	2005 XE_{45}	—	December 2, 2005	Kitt Peak	Spacewatch	·	630 m	MPC · JPL
354834	2005 XQ_{79}	—	December 4, 2005	Kitt Peak	Spacewatch	·	1.2 km	MPC · JPL
354835	2005 YB	—	December 19, 2005	Wrightwood	J. W. Young	·	680 m	MPC · JPL
354836	2005 YV_{4}	—	December 21, 2005	Kitt Peak	Spacewatch	·	720 m	MPC · JPL
354837	2005 YE_{16}	—	December 22, 2005	Kitt Peak	Spacewatch	·	970 m	MPC · JPL
354838	2005 YO_{19}	—	December 24, 2005	Kitt Peak	Spacewatch	·	680 m	MPC · JPL
354839	2005 YD_{28}	—	December 22, 2005	Kitt Peak	Spacewatch	CYB	4.4 km	MPC · JPL
354840	2005 YK_{48}	—	December 22, 2005	Kitt Peak	Spacewatch	·	750 m	MPC · JPL
354841	2005 YR_{52}	—	December 26, 2005	Mount Lemmon	Mount Lemmon Survey	·	750 m	MPC · JPL
354842	2005 YY_{95}	—	December 25, 2005	Kitt Peak	Spacewatch	CYB	5.3 km	MPC · JPL
354843	2005 YE_{110}	—	December 25, 2005	Kitt Peak	Spacewatch	·	810 m	MPC · JPL
354844	2005 YA_{120}	—	December 27, 2005	Mount Lemmon	Mount Lemmon Survey	·	640 m	MPC · JPL
354845	2005 YL_{126}	—	December 26, 2005	Kitt Peak	Spacewatch	·	890 m	MPC · JPL
354846	2005 YU_{130}	—	December 25, 2005	Mount Lemmon	Mount Lemmon Survey	·	750 m	MPC · JPL
354847	2005 YM_{132}	—	December 25, 2005	Mount Lemmon	Mount Lemmon Survey	·	720 m	MPC · JPL
354848	2005 YZ_{132}	—	December 26, 2005	Kitt Peak	Spacewatch	·	750 m	MPC · JPL
354849	2005 YJ_{134}	—	December 26, 2005	Kitt Peak	Spacewatch	·	690 m	MPC · JPL
354850	2005 YY_{148}	—	December 25, 2005	Kitt Peak	Spacewatch	·	720 m	MPC · JPL
354851	2005 YV_{149}	—	December 25, 2005	Kitt Peak	Spacewatch	·	720 m	MPC · JPL
354852	2005 YA_{172}	—	December 22, 2005	Catalina	CSS	PHO	1.2 km	MPC · JPL
354853	2005 YD_{191}	—	December 30, 2005	Kitt Peak	Spacewatch	·	730 m	MPC · JPL
354854	2005 YX_{199}	—	December 26, 2005	Kitt Peak	Spacewatch	·	860 m	MPC · JPL
354855	2005 YY_{202}	—	December 25, 2005	Mount Lemmon	Mount Lemmon Survey	·	640 m	MPC · JPL
354856	2005 YU_{203}	—	December 25, 2005	Mount Lemmon	Mount Lemmon Survey	·	610 m	MPC · JPL
354857	2005 YH_{208}	—	December 29, 2005	Catalina	CSS	·	950 m	MPC · JPL
354858	2005 YK_{217}	—	December 30, 2005	Socorro	LINEAR	·	940 m	MPC · JPL
354859	2005 YR_{220}	—	December 28, 2005	Palomar	NEAT	PHO	1.2 km	MPC · JPL
354860	2005 YX_{234}	—	December 28, 2005	Mount Lemmon	Mount Lemmon Survey	CYB	4.6 km	MPC · JPL
354861	2005 YC_{266}	—	December 27, 2005	Kitt Peak	Spacewatch	·	1.1 km	MPC · JPL
354862	2006 AJ_{20}	—	January 5, 2006	Catalina	CSS	·	930 m	MPC · JPL
354863	2006 AL_{23}	—	January 4, 2006	Kitt Peak	Spacewatch	·	680 m	MPC · JPL
354864	2006 AU_{39}	—	January 7, 2006	Mount Lemmon	Mount Lemmon Survey	·	740 m	MPC · JPL
354865	2006 AN_{47}	—	January 6, 2006	Mount Lemmon	Mount Lemmon Survey	·	860 m	MPC · JPL
354866	2006 AR_{55}	—	January 6, 2006	Kitt Peak	Spacewatch	·	880 m	MPC · JPL
354867	2006 AB_{80}	—	January 4, 2006	Kitt Peak	Spacewatch	·	1.2 km	MPC · JPL
354868	2006 AO_{105}	—	January 6, 2006	Kitt Peak	Spacewatch	·	720 m	MPC · JPL
354869	2006 BF_{5}	—	January 21, 2006	Kitt Peak	Spacewatch	(2076)	780 m	MPC · JPL
354870	2006 BJ_{11}	—	January 7, 2006	Mount Lemmon	Mount Lemmon Survey	·	1.2 km	MPC · JPL
354871	2006 BT_{23}	—	January 23, 2006	Socorro	LINEAR	·	700 m	MPC · JPL
354872	2006 BU_{39}	—	January 23, 2006	Socorro	LINEAR	·	750 m	MPC · JPL
354873	2006 BX_{42}	—	January 23, 2006	Kitt Peak	Spacewatch	·	930 m	MPC · JPL
354874	2006 BB_{43}	—	January 23, 2006	Kitt Peak	Spacewatch	·	1.0 km	MPC · JPL
354875	2006 BX_{53}	—	January 25, 2006	Kitt Peak	Spacewatch	·	900 m	MPC · JPL
354876	2006 BG_{55}	—	January 26, 2006	Mount Lemmon	Mount Lemmon Survey	APO	730 m	MPC · JPL
354877	2006 BO_{63}	—	January 22, 2006	Mount Lemmon	Mount Lemmon Survey	NYS	760 m	MPC · JPL
354878	2006 BW_{72}	—	January 23, 2006	Kitt Peak	Spacewatch	·	700 m	MPC · JPL
354879	2006 BG_{76}	—	March 26, 1996	Kitt Peak	Spacewatch	·	730 m	MPC · JPL
354880	2006 BO_{77}	—	January 23, 2006	Kitt Peak	Spacewatch	·	820 m	MPC · JPL
354881	2006 BO_{90}	—	January 25, 2006	Kitt Peak	Spacewatch	·	1.1 km	MPC · JPL
354882	2006 BS_{106}	—	January 25, 2006	Kitt Peak	Spacewatch	·	700 m	MPC · JPL
354883	2006 BE_{116}	—	January 26, 2006	Kitt Peak	Spacewatch	·	800 m	MPC · JPL
354884	2006 BZ_{116}	—	January 26, 2006	Kitt Peak	Spacewatch	·	880 m	MPC · JPL
354885	2006 BV_{138}	—	January 28, 2006	Mount Lemmon	Mount Lemmon Survey	·	790 m	MPC · JPL
354886	2006 BG_{143}	—	January 27, 2006	Mount Lemmon	Mount Lemmon Survey	·	560 m	MPC · JPL
354887	2006 BC_{147}	—	January 31, 2006	7300	W. K. Y. Yeung	·	1.1 km	MPC · JPL
354888	2006 BR_{165}	—	January 26, 2006	Mount Lemmon	Mount Lemmon Survey	V	700 m	MPC · JPL
354889	2006 BZ_{178}	—	January 27, 2006	Anderson Mesa	LONEOS	·	700 m	MPC · JPL
354890	2006 BS_{186}	—	January 28, 2006	Mount Lemmon	Mount Lemmon Survey	·	780 m	MPC · JPL
354891	2006 BZ_{193}	—	January 30, 2006	Kitt Peak	Spacewatch	·	950 m	MPC · JPL
354892	2006 BN_{204}	—	January 31, 2006	Kitt Peak	Spacewatch	·	660 m	MPC · JPL
354893	2006 BJ_{213}	—	January 22, 2006	Catalina	CSS	·	830 m	MPC · JPL
354894	2006 BP_{233}	—	January 31, 2006	Kitt Peak	Spacewatch	(2076)	910 m	MPC · JPL
354895	2006 BD_{241}	—	January 31, 2006	Kitt Peak	Spacewatch	·	1.1 km	MPC · JPL
354896	2006 BJ_{254}	—	January 31, 2006	Kitt Peak	Spacewatch	·	1.8 km	MPC · JPL
354897	2006 BZ_{262}	—	January 31, 2006	Kitt Peak	Spacewatch	·	740 m	MPC · JPL
354898	2006 BP_{267}	—	January 26, 2006	Catalina	CSS	·	1.2 km	MPC · JPL
354899	2006 BK_{268}	—	January 27, 2006	Catalina	CSS	PHO	1.4 km	MPC · JPL
354900	2006 BX_{269}	—	January 28, 2006	Catalina	CSS	PHO	3.3 km	MPC · JPL

== 354901–355000 ==
back to top

Designation			Discovery			Properties		Ref
Permanent	Provisional	Named after	Date	Site	Discoverer(s)	Category	Diam.	Ref
354901	2006 BK_{275}	—	January 30, 2006	Kitt Peak	Spacewatch	·	900 m	MPC · JPL
354902	2006 BZ_{281}	—	January 28, 2006	Mount Lemmon	Mount Lemmon Survey	·	600 m	MPC · JPL
354903 Shostak	2006 BT_{282}	Shostak	December 2, 2005	Kitt Peak	L. H. Wasserman, R. L. Millis	·	940 m	MPC · JPL
354904	2006 CX_{28}	—	February 2, 2006	Kitt Peak	Spacewatch	·	1.1 km	MPC · JPL
354905	2006 CH_{38}	—	February 2, 2006	Kitt Peak	Spacewatch	·	870 m	MPC · JPL
354906	2006 CL_{40}	—	February 2, 2006	Mount Lemmon	Mount Lemmon Survey	·	1.2 km	MPC · JPL
354907	2006 CW_{42}	—	February 2, 2006	Kitt Peak	Spacewatch	·	990 m	MPC · JPL
354908	2006 CE_{62}	—	February 13, 2006	Palomar	NEAT	·	1.6 km	MPC · JPL
354909	2006 DN_{3}	—	February 20, 2006	Catalina	CSS	·	1.8 km	MPC · JPL
354910	2006 DE_{11}	—	February 21, 2006	Catalina	CSS	PHO	1.5 km	MPC · JPL
354911	2006 DC_{28}	—	February 20, 2006	Kitt Peak	Spacewatch	·	1.2 km	MPC · JPL
354912	2006 DX_{29}	—	February 20, 2006	Kitt Peak	Spacewatch	·	970 m	MPC · JPL
354913	2006 DZ_{30}	—	February 20, 2006	Kitt Peak	Spacewatch	·	1.4 km	MPC · JPL
354914	2006 DC_{32}	—	February 20, 2006	Mount Lemmon	Mount Lemmon Survey	V	880 m	MPC · JPL
354915	2006 DJ_{37}	—	February 7, 2006	Mount Lemmon	Mount Lemmon Survey	·	1.2 km	MPC · JPL
354916	2006 DJ_{43}	—	February 20, 2006	Kitt Peak	Spacewatch	·	910 m	MPC · JPL
354917	2006 DN_{43}	—	February 20, 2006	Kitt Peak	Spacewatch	·	1.0 km	MPC · JPL
354918	2006 DE_{45}	—	February 20, 2006	Kitt Peak	Spacewatch	NYS	990 m	MPC · JPL
354919	2006 DJ_{69}	—	February 20, 2006	Kitt Peak	Spacewatch	·	1.2 km	MPC · JPL
354920	2006 DZ_{75}	—	February 24, 2006	Kitt Peak	Spacewatch	V	570 m	MPC · JPL
354921	2006 DK_{77}	—	February 24, 2006	Kitt Peak	Spacewatch	·	900 m	MPC · JPL
354922	2006 DX_{85}	—	February 24, 2006	Kitt Peak	Spacewatch	PHO	1.5 km	MPC · JPL
354923	2006 DN_{117}	—	February 27, 2006	Kitt Peak	Spacewatch	NYS	990 m	MPC · JPL
354924	2006 DV_{118}	—	February 27, 2006	Mayhill	Lowe, A.	·	860 m	MPC · JPL
354925	2006 DD_{119}	—	February 20, 2006	Catalina	CSS	·	1.2 km	MPC · JPL
354926	2006 DZ_{136}	—	February 25, 2006	Kitt Peak	Spacewatch	V	650 m	MPC · JPL
354927	2006 DL_{138}	—	February 25, 2006	Kitt Peak	Spacewatch	·	840 m	MPC · JPL
354928	2006 DN_{140}	—	February 25, 2006	Kitt Peak	Spacewatch	·	1.3 km	MPC · JPL
354929	2006 DR_{150}	—	February 25, 2006	Kitt Peak	Spacewatch	V	610 m	MPC · JPL
354930	2006 DO_{153}	—	February 25, 2006	Kitt Peak	Spacewatch	·	1.3 km	MPC · JPL
354931	2006 DR_{186}	—	February 27, 2006	Kitt Peak	Spacewatch	NYS	1.4 km	MPC · JPL
354932	2006 DA_{193}	—	February 27, 2006	Kitt Peak	Spacewatch	·	960 m	MPC · JPL
354933	2006 DT_{207}	—	July 5, 2003	Kitt Peak	Spacewatch	NYS	1.2 km	MPC · JPL
354934	2006 DR_{210}	—	February 22, 2006	Mount Lemmon	Mount Lemmon Survey	ERI	1.7 km	MPC · JPL
354935	2006 DL_{215}	—	February 27, 2006	Kitt Peak	Spacewatch	·	1.1 km	MPC · JPL
354936	2006 EG_{15}	—	March 2, 2006	Kitt Peak	Spacewatch	·	1.0 km	MPC · JPL
354937	2006 EA_{17}	—	March 2, 2006	Mount Lemmon	Mount Lemmon Survey	·	1.2 km	MPC · JPL
354938	2006 EQ_{17}	—	March 2, 2006	Kitt Peak	Spacewatch	·	1.1 km	MPC · JPL
354939	2006 EL_{23}	—	March 3, 2006	Kitt Peak	Spacewatch	NYS	900 m	MPC · JPL
354940	2006 EW_{23}	—	March 3, 2006	Kitt Peak	Spacewatch	·	990 m	MPC · JPL
354941	2006 EM_{29}	—	March 3, 2006	Kitt Peak	Spacewatch	·	810 m	MPC · JPL
354942	2006 EC_{50}	—	March 4, 2006	Kitt Peak	Spacewatch	·	940 m	MPC · JPL
354943	2006 EE_{51}	—	March 4, 2006	Kitt Peak	Spacewatch	NYS	1.1 km	MPC · JPL
354944	2006 EJ_{55}	—	March 5, 2006	Kitt Peak	Spacewatch	·	950 m	MPC · JPL
354945	2006 EV_{55}	—	February 24, 2006	Kitt Peak	Spacewatch	V	690 m	MPC · JPL
354946	2006 ER_{56}	—	March 5, 2006	Kitt Peak	Spacewatch	T_{j} (2.97) · 3:2	8.4 km	MPC · JPL
354947	2006 EU_{56}	—	December 25, 2005	Mount Lemmon	Mount Lemmon Survey	·	970 m	MPC · JPL
354948	2006 EJ_{62}	—	January 8, 2006	Mount Lemmon	Mount Lemmon Survey	·	1.3 km	MPC · JPL
354949	2006 EK_{63}	—	March 5, 2006	Kitt Peak	Spacewatch	·	940 m	MPC · JPL
354950	2006 EF_{73}	—	March 5, 2006	Mount Lemmon	Mount Lemmon Survey	·	890 m	MPC · JPL
354951	2006 FA_{1}	—	March 19, 2006	Bergisch Gladbach	W. Bickel	·	1.1 km	MPC · JPL
354952	2006 FJ_{9}	—	March 24, 2006	Socorro	LINEAR	AMO	510 m	MPC · JPL
354953	2006 FG_{10}	—	March 4, 2006	Catalina	CSS	·	1.3 km	MPC · JPL
354954	2006 FT_{23}	—	March 24, 2006	Kitt Peak	Spacewatch	·	1.1 km	MPC · JPL
354955	2006 FD_{37}	—	March 24, 2006	Socorro	LINEAR	·	1.3 km	MPC · JPL
354956	2006 FE_{45}	—	January 27, 2006	Mount Lemmon	Mount Lemmon Survey	NYS	1.1 km	MPC · JPL
354957	2006 GU_{15}	—	April 2, 2006	Kitt Peak	Spacewatch	MAS	880 m	MPC · JPL
354958	2006 GD_{38}	—	April 1, 2006	Socorro	LINEAR	·	1.3 km	MPC · JPL
354959	2006 GF_{39}	—	April 7, 2006	Anderson Mesa	LONEOS	H	710 m	MPC · JPL
354960	2006 HF	—	April 18, 2006	Kitt Peak	Spacewatch	·	1.3 km	MPC · JPL
354961	2006 HC_{8}	—	April 18, 2006	Kitt Peak	Spacewatch	·	1.3 km	MPC · JPL
354962	2006 HD_{8}	—	April 18, 2006	Kitt Peak	Spacewatch	NYS	1.4 km	MPC · JPL
354963	2006 HU_{9}	—	April 19, 2006	Kitt Peak	Spacewatch	V	830 m	MPC · JPL
354964	2006 HW_{10}	—	April 19, 2006	Kitt Peak	Spacewatch	V	870 m	MPC · JPL
354965	2006 HC_{28}	—	April 20, 2006	Kitt Peak	Spacewatch	·	1.4 km	MPC · JPL
354966	2006 HL_{30}	—	April 20, 2006	Anderson Mesa	LONEOS	·	2.1 km	MPC · JPL
354967	2006 HB_{31}	—	April 25, 2006	Kambah	Herald, D.	·	1.4 km	MPC · JPL
354968	2006 HN_{32}	—	April 19, 2006	Mount Lemmon	Mount Lemmon Survey	·	1.1 km	MPC · JPL
354969	2006 HO_{56}	—	April 19, 2006	Anderson Mesa	LONEOS	·	1.3 km	MPC · JPL
354970	2006 HP_{56}	—	April 19, 2006	Catalina	CSS	·	1.4 km	MPC · JPL
354971	2006 HQ_{61}	—	April 24, 2006	Kitt Peak	Spacewatch	MAS	730 m	MPC · JPL
354972	2006 HV_{66}	—	April 24, 2006	Kitt Peak	Spacewatch	NYS	1.3 km	MPC · JPL
354973	2006 HC_{95}	—	September 22, 2004	Kitt Peak	Spacewatch	·	1.2 km	MPC · JPL
354974	2006 HV_{106}	—	April 30, 2006	Kitt Peak	Spacewatch	·	1.0 km	MPC · JPL
354975	2006 HU_{115}	—	April 26, 2006	Kitt Peak	Spacewatch	3:2 · SHU	5.3 km	MPC · JPL
354976	2006 HF_{118}	—	April 30, 2006	Kitt Peak	Spacewatch	NYS	1.1 km	MPC · JPL
354977	2006 HS_{120}	—	April 30, 2006	Kitt Peak	Spacewatch	·	1.2 km	MPC · JPL
354978	2006 HF_{122}	—	April 24, 2006	Socorro	LINEAR	·	1.2 km	MPC · JPL
354979	2006 JH_{21}	—	May 2, 2006	Kitt Peak	Spacewatch	·	1.4 km	MPC · JPL
354980	2006 JP_{37}	—	May 5, 2006	Kitt Peak	Spacewatch	3:2	5.8 km	MPC · JPL
354981	2006 KY_{21}	—	May 19, 2006	Catalina	CSS	·	1.4 km	MPC · JPL
354982	2006 KC_{32}	—	May 20, 2006	Kitt Peak	Spacewatch	MAS	760 m	MPC · JPL
354983	2006 KQ_{32}	—	May 20, 2006	Kitt Peak	Spacewatch	MAS	910 m	MPC · JPL
354984	2006 KM_{34}	—	May 6, 2006	Mount Lemmon	Mount Lemmon Survey	MAS	790 m	MPC · JPL
354985	2006 KR_{42}	—	May 20, 2006	Kitt Peak	Spacewatch	·	1.3 km	MPC · JPL
354986	2006 KB_{43}	—	May 20, 2006	Kitt Peak	Spacewatch	NYS	1.3 km	MPC · JPL
354987	2006 KE_{51}	—	May 21, 2006	Mount Lemmon	Mount Lemmon Survey	·	1.3 km	MPC · JPL
354988	2006 KU_{53}	—	May 21, 2006	Kitt Peak	Spacewatch	·	1.5 km	MPC · JPL
354989	2006 KK_{102}	—	May 27, 2006	Kitt Peak	Spacewatch	·	1.5 km	MPC · JPL
354990	2006 KO_{104}	—	May 26, 2006	Kitt Peak	Spacewatch	H	620 m	MPC · JPL
354991	2006 MA_{15}	—	June 23, 2006	Palomar	NEAT	·	2.2 km	MPC · JPL
354992	2006 OW_{11}	—	July 21, 2006	Catalina	CSS	ADE	2.5 km	MPC · JPL
354993	2006 OK_{21}	—	July 21, 2006	Mount Lemmon	Mount Lemmon Survey	·	1.8 km	MPC · JPL
354994	2006 OW_{21}	—	July 29, 2006	Siding Spring	SSS	·	2.4 km	MPC · JPL
354995	2006 PL_{17}	—	August 15, 2006	Lulin	LUSS	PAD	1.7 km	MPC · JPL
354996	2006 PY_{19}	—	August 13, 2006	Palomar	NEAT	BRU	3.5 km	MPC · JPL
354997	2006 PG_{28}	—	August 14, 2006	Siding Spring	SSS	·	2.4 km	MPC · JPL
354998	2006 PL_{31}	—	August 13, 2006	Siding Spring	SSS	·	2.4 km	MPC · JPL
354999	2006 PM_{42}	—	August 14, 2006	Siding Spring	SSS	·	2.5 km	MPC · JPL
355000	2006 QX_{11}	—	August 16, 2006	Siding Spring	SSS	NEM	2.8 km	MPC · JPL

back to top

== See also ==
- Meanings of minor-planet names: 354001–355000
