= List of minor planets: 361001–362000 =

The following is a partial list of minor planets, running from minor-planet number 361001 through 362000, inclusive. The primary data for this and other partial lists is based on JPL's "Small-Body Orbital Elements" and data available from the Minor Planet Center. Critical list information is also provided by the MPC, unless otherwise specified from Lowell Observatory. A detailed description of the table's columns and additional sources are given on the main page including a complete list of every page in this series, and a statistical break-up on the dynamical classification of minor planets.

Also see the summary list of all named bodies in numerical and alphabetical order, and the corresponding naming citations for the number range of this particular list. New namings may only be added to this list after official publication, as the preannouncement of names is condemned by the Working Group for Small Bodies Nomenclature of the International Astronomical Union.

| Near-Earth obj. | MBA (inner) | MBA (outer) | Centaur |
| Mars-crosser | MBA (middle) | Jupiter trojan | Trans-Neptunian obj. |
| Unclassified |

== 361001–361100 ==
| Designation | | | Discovery | | | Properties | | Ref |
| Permanent | Provisional | Named after | Date | Site | Discoverer(s) | Category | Diam. | Ref |
|---|---|---|---|---|---|---|---|---|
| 361001 | 2005 US_{475} | — | October 22, 2005 | Kitt Peak | Spacewatch | · | 3.8 km | MPC · JPL |
| 361002 | 2005 UB_{486} | — | October 23, 2005 | Palomar | NEAT | EUP | 5.3 km | MPC · JPL |
| 361003 | 2005 UE_{512} | — | October 29, 2005 | Kitt Peak | Spacewatch | · | 3.2 km | MPC · JPL |
| 361004 | 2005 US_{515} | — | October 22, 2005 | Apache Point | A. C. Becker | · | 2.2 km | MPC · JPL |
| 361005 | 2005 UW_{515} | — | October 22, 2005 | Apache Point | A. C. Becker | · | 2.9 km | MPC · JPL |
| 361006 | 2005 UE_{519} | — | October 26, 2005 | Apache Point | A. C. Becker | · | 3.4 km | MPC · JPL |
| 361007 | 2005 UG_{526} | — | October 25, 2005 | Kitt Peak | Spacewatch | · | 2.0 km | MPC · JPL |
| 361008 | 2005 VB_{45} | — | November 4, 2005 | Kitt Peak | Spacewatch | · | 2.0 km | MPC · JPL |
| 361009 | 2005 VU_{45} | — | November 4, 2005 | Kitt Peak | Spacewatch | THM | 2.0 km | MPC · JPL |
| 361010 | 2005 VS_{49} | — | November 2, 2005 | Socorro | LINEAR | · | 3.7 km | MPC · JPL |
| 361011 | 2005 VQ_{77} | — | November 5, 2005 | Kitt Peak | Spacewatch | · | 2.5 km | MPC · JPL |
| 361012 | 2005 VG_{92} | — | November 6, 2005 | Mount Lemmon | Mount Lemmon Survey | · | 1.6 km | MPC · JPL |
| 361013 | 2005 VQ_{102} | — | November 2, 2005 | Catalina | CSS | · | 4.2 km | MPC · JPL |
| 361014 | 2005 VT_{126} | — | November 1, 2005 | Apache Point | A. C. Becker | KOR | 1.2 km | MPC · JPL |
| 361015 | 2005 VU_{126} | — | November 1, 2005 | Apache Point | A. C. Becker | · | 2.4 km | MPC · JPL |
| 361016 | 2005 VQ_{133} | — | November 1, 2005 | Apache Point | A. C. Becker | · | 2.5 km | MPC · JPL |
| 361017 | 2005 WB_{11} | — | November 22, 2005 | Kitt Peak | Spacewatch | · | 2.4 km | MPC · JPL |
| 361018 | 2005 WN_{29} | — | September 30, 2005 | Mount Lemmon | Mount Lemmon Survey | EOS | 2.0 km | MPC · JPL |
| 361019 | 2005 WN_{36} | — | November 22, 2005 | Kitt Peak | Spacewatch | · | 3.8 km | MPC · JPL |
| 361020 | 2005 WJ_{39} | — | November 25, 2005 | Mount Lemmon | Mount Lemmon Survey | · | 3.0 km | MPC · JPL |
| 361021 | 2005 WV_{42} | — | November 21, 2005 | Kitt Peak | Spacewatch | · | 560 m | MPC · JPL |
| 361022 | 2005 WQ_{51} | — | November 10, 2005 | Mount Lemmon | Mount Lemmon Survey | EOS | 2.2 km | MPC · JPL |
| 361023 | 2005 WV_{56} | — | November 29, 2005 | Junk Bond | D. Healy | · | 2.5 km | MPC · JPL |
| 361024 | 2005 WQ_{68} | — | November 25, 2005 | Mount Lemmon | Mount Lemmon Survey | · | 1.9 km | MPC · JPL |
| 361025 | 2005 WK_{70} | — | November 26, 2005 | Mount Lemmon | Mount Lemmon Survey | · | 1.8 km | MPC · JPL |
| 361026 | 2005 WY_{87} | — | November 28, 2005 | Mount Lemmon | Mount Lemmon Survey | · | 3.9 km | MPC · JPL |
| 361027 | 2005 WS_{88} | — | November 22, 2005 | Kitt Peak | Spacewatch | · | 4.6 km | MPC · JPL |
| 361028 | 2005 WA_{95} | — | November 26, 2005 | Kitt Peak | Spacewatch | · | 3.2 km | MPC · JPL |
| 361029 | 2005 WC_{95} | — | November 26, 2005 | Kitt Peak | Spacewatch | · | 2.1 km | MPC · JPL |
| 361030 | 2005 WP_{97} | — | November 12, 2005 | Kitt Peak | Spacewatch | · | 2.2 km | MPC · JPL |
| 361031 | 2005 WD_{101} | — | November 29, 2005 | Socorro | LINEAR | · | 5.5 km | MPC · JPL |
| 361032 | 2005 WL_{102} | — | November 29, 2005 | Mount Lemmon | Mount Lemmon Survey | · | 770 m | MPC · JPL |
| 361033 | 2005 WR_{110} | — | November 22, 2005 | Kitt Peak | Spacewatch | · | 2.2 km | MPC · JPL |
| 361034 | 2005 WS_{115} | — | September 25, 2005 | Kitt Peak | Spacewatch | BRA | 1.5 km | MPC · JPL |
| 361035 | 2005 WX_{121} | — | November 30, 2005 | Mount Lemmon | Mount Lemmon Survey | · | 780 m | MPC · JPL |
| 361036 | 2005 WG_{140} | — | November 26, 2005 | Mount Lemmon | Mount Lemmon Survey | · | 2.5 km | MPC · JPL |
| 361037 | 2005 WY_{160} | — | November 28, 2005 | Socorro | LINEAR | THB | 4.5 km | MPC · JPL |
| 361038 | 2005 WG_{208} | — | November 25, 2005 | Kitt Peak | Spacewatch | · | 3.7 km | MPC · JPL |
| 361039 | 2005 XQ_{13} | — | December 1, 2005 | Kitt Peak | Spacewatch | EOS | 2.3 km | MPC · JPL |
| 361040 | 2005 XU_{28} | — | December 2, 2005 | Socorro | LINEAR | EOS | 2.5 km | MPC · JPL |
| 361041 | 2005 XM_{45} | — | December 2, 2005 | Kitt Peak | Spacewatch | · | 3.6 km | MPC · JPL |
| 361042 | 2005 XK_{48} | — | December 2, 2005 | Mount Lemmon | Mount Lemmon Survey | · | 580 m | MPC · JPL |
| 361043 | 2005 XO_{72} | — | December 6, 2005 | Kitt Peak | Spacewatch | EOS | 2.4 km | MPC · JPL |
| 361044 | 2005 XG_{76} | — | November 25, 2005 | Catalina | CSS | EOS | 2.4 km | MPC · JPL |
| 361045 | 2005 XQ_{78} | — | November 10, 2005 | Kitt Peak | Spacewatch | EOS | 2.5 km | MPC · JPL |
| 361046 | 2005 XN_{82} | — | December 10, 2005 | Kitt Peak | Spacewatch | · | 3.4 km | MPC · JPL |
| 361047 | 2005 YX_{4} | — | October 1, 1999 | Kitt Peak | Spacewatch | · | 1.7 km | MPC · JPL |
| 361048 | 2005 YZ_{12} | — | December 22, 2005 | Kitt Peak | Spacewatch | · | 660 m | MPC · JPL |
| 361049 | 2005 YN_{18} | — | December 23, 2005 | Kitt Peak | Spacewatch | · | 3.9 km | MPC · JPL |
| 361050 | 2005 YC_{20} | — | December 24, 2005 | Kitt Peak | Spacewatch | · | 770 m | MPC · JPL |
| 361051 | 2005 YF_{20} | — | December 24, 2005 | Kitt Peak | Spacewatch | · | 670 m | MPC · JPL |
| 361052 | 2005 YC_{43} | — | December 24, 2005 | Kitt Peak | Spacewatch | · | 900 m | MPC · JPL |
| 361053 | 2005 YH_{43} | — | December 24, 2005 | Kitt Peak | Spacewatch | · | 790 m | MPC · JPL |
| 361054 | 2005 YZ_{47} | — | December 26, 2005 | Kitt Peak | Spacewatch | T_{j} (2.98) · EUP | 5.6 km | MPC · JPL |
| 361055 | 2005 YK_{57} | — | December 24, 2005 | Kitt Peak | Spacewatch | · | 2.9 km | MPC · JPL |
| 361056 | 2005 YT_{63} | — | December 1, 2005 | Mount Lemmon | Mount Lemmon Survey | · | 3.2 km | MPC · JPL |
| 361057 | 2005 YB_{85} | — | December 25, 2005 | Mount Lemmon | Mount Lemmon Survey | · | 2.4 km | MPC · JPL |
| 361058 | 2005 YT_{113} | — | December 5, 2005 | Mount Lemmon | Mount Lemmon Survey | · | 4.2 km | MPC · JPL |
| 361059 | 2005 YQ_{119} | — | December 27, 2005 | Kitt Peak | Spacewatch | · | 2.8 km | MPC · JPL |
| 361060 | 2005 YN_{120} | — | December 27, 2005 | Mount Lemmon | Mount Lemmon Survey | · | 3.9 km | MPC · JPL |
| 361061 | 2005 YQ_{139} | — | December 28, 2005 | Mount Lemmon | Mount Lemmon Survey | · | 850 m | MPC · JPL |
| 361062 | 2005 YR_{152} | — | December 28, 2005 | Kitt Peak | Spacewatch | · | 3.4 km | MPC · JPL |
| 361063 | 2005 YH_{167} | — | December 27, 2005 | Kitt Peak | Spacewatch | · | 4.1 km | MPC · JPL |
| 361064 | 2005 YH_{192} | — | December 30, 2005 | Kitt Peak | Spacewatch | · | 4.1 km | MPC · JPL |
| 361065 | 2005 YQ_{211} | — | December 28, 2005 | Catalina | CSS | · | 890 m | MPC · JPL |
| 361066 | 2005 YO_{215} | — | December 29, 2005 | Mount Lemmon | Mount Lemmon Survey | · | 4.8 km | MPC · JPL |
| 361067 | 2005 YX_{217} | — | November 25, 2005 | Kitt Peak | Spacewatch | · | 2.7 km | MPC · JPL |
| 361068 | 2005 YG_{232} | — | December 28, 2005 | Palomar | NEAT | · | 3.3 km | MPC · JPL |
| 361069 | 2005 YD_{265} | — | December 25, 2005 | Kitt Peak | Spacewatch | · | 3.1 km | MPC · JPL |
| 361070 | 2005 YN_{279} | — | December 25, 2005 | Mount Lemmon | Mount Lemmon Survey | EOS | 2.1 km | MPC · JPL |
| 361071 | 2006 AO_{4} | — | January 8, 2006 | Mount Lemmon | Mount Lemmon Survey | AMO +1km | 2.7 km | MPC · JPL |
| 361072 | 2006 AX_{46} | — | January 6, 2006 | Kitt Peak | Spacewatch | VER · fast | 3.4 km | MPC · JPL |
| 361073 | 2006 AQ_{47} | — | January 7, 2006 | Kitt Peak | Spacewatch | · | 3.7 km | MPC · JPL |
| 361074 | 2006 AX_{73} | — | September 20, 2001 | Socorro | LINEAR | · | 790 m | MPC · JPL |
| 361075 | 2006 BQ_{12} | — | August 21, 2004 | Kitt Peak | Spacewatch | BAP | 970 m | MPC · JPL |
| 361076 | 2006 BH_{24} | — | January 23, 2006 | Mount Lemmon | Mount Lemmon Survey | · | 3.2 km | MPC · JPL |
| 361077 | 2006 BO_{31} | — | January 20, 2006 | Kitt Peak | Spacewatch | · | 740 m | MPC · JPL |
| 361078 | 2006 BX_{45} | — | January 23, 2006 | Mount Lemmon | Mount Lemmon Survey | · | 1.1 km | MPC · JPL |
| 361079 | 2006 BQ_{78} | — | January 23, 2006 | Mount Lemmon | Mount Lemmon Survey | · | 910 m | MPC · JPL |
| 361080 | 2006 BA_{88} | — | January 25, 2006 | Kitt Peak | Spacewatch | · | 4.2 km | MPC · JPL |
| 361081 | 2006 BY_{88} | — | January 25, 2006 | Kitt Peak | Spacewatch | · | 610 m | MPC · JPL |
| 361082 | 2006 BU_{96} | — | January 26, 2006 | Kitt Peak | Spacewatch | · | 990 m | MPC · JPL |
| 361083 | 2006 BU_{107} | — | January 25, 2006 | Kitt Peak | Spacewatch | · | 660 m | MPC · JPL |
| 361084 | 2006 BE_{118} | — | January 26, 2006 | Kitt Peak | Spacewatch | · | 590 m | MPC · JPL |
| 361085 | 2006 BW_{133} | — | January 26, 2006 | Kitt Peak | Spacewatch | · | 710 m | MPC · JPL |
| 361086 | 2006 BL_{185} | — | January 28, 2006 | Mount Lemmon | Mount Lemmon Survey | · | 750 m | MPC · JPL |
| 361087 | 2006 BF_{189} | — | January 28, 2006 | Kitt Peak | Spacewatch | · | 840 m | MPC · JPL |
| 361088 | 2006 BP_{196} | — | January 30, 2006 | Kitt Peak | Spacewatch | · | 910 m | MPC · JPL |
| 361089 | 2006 BN_{246} | — | January 31, 2006 | Kitt Peak | Spacewatch | · | 760 m | MPC · JPL |
| 361090 | 2006 BB_{248} | — | January 31, 2006 | Kitt Peak | Spacewatch | · | 560 m | MPC · JPL |
| 361091 | 2006 BE_{256} | — | January 31, 2006 | Kitt Peak | Spacewatch | · | 860 m | MPC · JPL |
| 361092 | 2006 BN_{274} | — | January 30, 2006 | Kitt Peak | Spacewatch | · | 730 m | MPC · JPL |
| 361093 | 2006 BN_{279} | — | January 30, 2006 | Kitt Peak | Spacewatch | · | 4.3 km | MPC · JPL |
| 361094 | 2006 CJ_{60} | — | February 2, 2006 | Vail-Jarnac | Jarnac | · | 470 m | MPC · JPL |
| 361095 | 2006 DD | — | January 5, 2006 | Catalina | CSS | PHO | 1.1 km | MPC · JPL |
| 361096 | 2006 DW_{14} | — | February 18, 2006 | Pla D'Arguines | R. Ferrando, Ferrando, M. | · | 4.4 km | MPC · JPL |
| 361097 | 2006 DJ_{24} | — | February 20, 2006 | Socorro | LINEAR | · | 4.7 km | MPC · JPL |
| 361098 | 2006 DL_{24} | — | February 20, 2006 | Kitt Peak | Spacewatch | · | 840 m | MPC · JPL |
| 361099 | 2006 DU_{26} | — | February 20, 2006 | Kitt Peak | Spacewatch | · | 850 m | MPC · JPL |
| 361100 | 2006 DV_{36} | — | February 20, 2006 | Kitt Peak | Spacewatch | · | 1.1 km | MPC · JPL |

== 361101–361200 ==
back to top

| Designation | | | Discovery | | | Properties | | Ref |
| Permanent | Provisional | Named after | Date | Site | Discoverer(s) | Category | Diam. | Ref |
|---|---|---|---|---|---|---|---|---|
| 361101 | 2006 DP_{59} | — | February 24, 2006 | Mount Lemmon | Mount Lemmon Survey | · | 980 m | MPC · JPL |
| 361102 | 2006 DU_{59} | — | February 24, 2006 | Mount Lemmon | Mount Lemmon Survey | · | 1.0 km | MPC · JPL |
| 361103 | 2006 DR_{70} | — | February 21, 2006 | Mount Lemmon | Mount Lemmon Survey | · | 630 m | MPC · JPL |
| 361104 | 2006 DZ_{99} | — | February 25, 2006 | Kitt Peak | Spacewatch | · | 680 m | MPC · JPL |
| 361105 | 2006 DN_{118} | — | February 21, 2006 | Mount Lemmon | Mount Lemmon Survey | · | 980 m | MPC · JPL |
| 361106 | 2006 DW_{123} | — | February 24, 2006 | Mount Lemmon | Mount Lemmon Survey | · | 710 m | MPC · JPL |
| 361107 | 2006 DN_{161} | — | February 27, 2006 | Kitt Peak | Spacewatch | · | 640 m | MPC · JPL |
| 361108 | 2006 DZ_{198} | — | February 28, 2006 | Catalina | CSS | · | 710 m | MPC · JPL |
| 361109 | 2006 DF_{206} | — | January 7, 2006 | Mount Lemmon | Mount Lemmon Survey | · | 910 m | MPC · JPL |
| 361110 | 2006 DS_{209} | — | February 28, 2006 | Mount Lemmon | Mount Lemmon Survey | · | 1.1 km | MPC · JPL |
| 361111 | 2006 DR_{211} | — | February 24, 2006 | Mount Lemmon | Mount Lemmon Survey | · | 730 m | MPC · JPL |
| 361112 | 2006 ER_{2} | — | March 2, 2006 | Kitt Peak | Spacewatch | · | 780 m | MPC · JPL |
| 361113 | 2006 ER_{8} | — | January 5, 2006 | Mount Lemmon | Mount Lemmon Survey | · | 720 m | MPC · JPL |
| 361114 | 2006 EQ_{16} | — | March 2, 2006 | Kitt Peak | Spacewatch | V | 640 m | MPC · JPL |
| 361115 | 2006 EZ_{23} | — | March 3, 2006 | Kitt Peak | Spacewatch | · | 650 m | MPC · JPL |
| 361116 | 2006 EE_{40} | — | March 4, 2006 | Kitt Peak | Spacewatch | · | 900 m | MPC · JPL |
| 361117 | 2006 FO_{13} | — | March 23, 2006 | Kitt Peak | Spacewatch | · | 900 m | MPC · JPL |
| 361118 | 2006 FZ_{17} | — | March 23, 2006 | Kitt Peak | Spacewatch | · | 670 m | MPC · JPL |
| 361119 | 2006 FN_{27} | — | March 24, 2006 | Mount Lemmon | Mount Lemmon Survey | · | 780 m | MPC · JPL |
| 361120 | 2006 FJ_{42} | — | March 26, 2006 | Mount Lemmon | Mount Lemmon Survey | · | 1.2 km | MPC · JPL |
| 361121 | 2006 FD_{44} | — | March 23, 2006 | Catalina | CSS | · | 930 m | MPC · JPL |
| 361122 | 2006 GW_{1} | — | April 2, 2006 | Piszkéstető | K. Sárneczky | (2076) | 780 m | MPC · JPL |
| 361123 | 2006 GW_{2} | — | April 8, 2006 | Anderson Mesa | LONEOS | AMO | 320 m | MPC · JPL |
| 361124 | 2006 GC_{4} | — | April 2, 2006 | Kitt Peak | Spacewatch | · | 740 m | MPC · JPL |
| 361125 | 2006 GP_{15} | — | April 2, 2006 | Kitt Peak | Spacewatch | · | 990 m | MPC · JPL |
| 361126 | 2006 GR_{15} | — | April 2, 2006 | Kitt Peak | Spacewatch | (2076) | 960 m | MPC · JPL |
| 361127 | 2006 GT_{20} | — | April 2, 2006 | Kitt Peak | Spacewatch | V | 830 m | MPC · JPL |
| 361128 | 2006 GG_{21} | — | December 3, 2005 | Mauna Kea | A. Boattini | · | 890 m | MPC · JPL |
| 361129 | 2006 GQ_{21} | — | April 2, 2006 | Mount Lemmon | Mount Lemmon Survey | · | 920 m | MPC · JPL |
| 361130 | 2006 GJ_{23} | — | April 2, 2006 | Kitt Peak | Spacewatch | · | 800 m | MPC · JPL |
| 361131 | 2006 GH_{26} | — | April 2, 2006 | Kitt Peak | Spacewatch | · | 1.7 km | MPC · JPL |
| 361132 | 2006 GM_{28} | — | April 2, 2006 | Kitt Peak | Spacewatch | · | 1.1 km | MPC · JPL |
| 361133 | 2006 GZ_{36} | — | April 8, 2006 | Mount Lemmon | Mount Lemmon Survey | · | 840 m | MPC · JPL |
| 361134 | 2006 GX_{44} | — | April 7, 2006 | Mount Lemmon | Mount Lemmon Survey | · | 990 m | MPC · JPL |
| 361135 | 2006 HL_{9} | — | April 19, 2006 | Anderson Mesa | LONEOS | · | 920 m | MPC · JPL |
| 361136 | 2006 HM_{40} | — | April 21, 2006 | Catalina | CSS | V | 710 m | MPC · JPL |
| 361137 | 2006 HV_{43} | — | April 24, 2006 | Mount Lemmon | Mount Lemmon Survey | · | 1.1 km | MPC · JPL |
| 361138 | 2006 HP_{44} | — | April 24, 2006 | Mount Lemmon | Mount Lemmon Survey | · | 1.4 km | MPC · JPL |
| 361139 | 2006 HN_{57} | — | April 29, 2006 | Wrightwood | J. W. Young | · | 830 m | MPC · JPL |
| 361140 | 2006 HL_{61} | — | April 24, 2006 | Kitt Peak | Spacewatch | · | 950 m | MPC · JPL |
| 361141 | 2006 HQ_{65} | — | April 24, 2006 | Kitt Peak | Spacewatch | · | 1.1 km | MPC · JPL |
| 361142 | 2006 HG_{81} | — | April 26, 2006 | Kitt Peak | Spacewatch | · | 1.1 km | MPC · JPL |
| 361143 | 2006 HV_{82} | — | April 26, 2006 | Kitt Peak | Spacewatch | · | 860 m | MPC · JPL |
| 361144 | 2006 HK_{83} | — | April 26, 2006 | Kitt Peak | Spacewatch | · | 930 m | MPC · JPL |
| 361145 | 2006 HE_{84} | — | April 26, 2006 | Kitt Peak | Spacewatch | · | 980 m | MPC · JPL |
| 361146 | 2006 HT_{84} | — | April 26, 2006 | Kitt Peak | Spacewatch | · | 1.3 km | MPC · JPL |
| 361147 | 2006 HN_{87} | — | April 30, 2006 | Kitt Peak | Spacewatch | · | 680 m | MPC · JPL |
| 361148 | 2006 HU_{95} | — | April 30, 2006 | Kitt Peak | Spacewatch | MAS | 780 m | MPC · JPL |
| 361149 | 2006 HC_{99} | — | April 30, 2006 | Kitt Peak | Spacewatch | MAS | 600 m | MPC · JPL |
| 361150 | 2006 HL_{105} | — | April 25, 2006 | Catalina | CSS | PHO | 1.3 km | MPC · JPL |
| 361151 | 2006 HO_{108} | — | April 30, 2006 | Catalina | CSS | · | 890 m | MPC · JPL |
| 361152 | 2006 HD_{152} | — | April 19, 2006 | Catalina | CSS | NYS | 890 m | MPC · JPL |
| 361153 | 2006 HJ_{152} | — | April 24, 2006 | Piszkéstető | K. Sárneczky | · | 710 m | MPC · JPL |
| 361154 | 2006 JX_{1} | — | May 1, 2006 | Socorro | LINEAR | · | 1.1 km | MPC · JPL |
| 361155 | 2006 JN_{13} | — | April 19, 2006 | Kitt Peak | Spacewatch | PHO | 1.1 km | MPC · JPL |
| 361156 | 2006 JJ_{31} | — | May 3, 2006 | Kitt Peak | Spacewatch | · | 970 m | MPC · JPL |
| 361157 | 2006 JF_{44} | — | May 6, 2006 | Kitt Peak | Spacewatch | · | 1.5 km | MPC · JPL |
| 361158 | 2006 JN_{49} | — | May 1, 2006 | Kitt Peak | Spacewatch | PHO | 1.3 km | MPC · JPL |
| 361159 | 2006 JU_{52} | — | May 6, 2006 | Kitt Peak | Spacewatch | · | 2.0 km | MPC · JPL |
| 361160 | 2006 JP_{62} | — | May 1, 2006 | Kitt Peak | M. W. Buie | · | 850 m | MPC · JPL |
| 361161 | 2006 KS_{3} | — | May 19, 2006 | Mount Lemmon | Mount Lemmon Survey | · | 970 m | MPC · JPL |
| 361162 | 2006 KJ_{7} | — | May 19, 2006 | Mount Lemmon | Mount Lemmon Survey | · | 1.3 km | MPC · JPL |
| 361163 | 2006 KB_{9} | — | May 19, 2006 | Mount Lemmon | Mount Lemmon Survey | · | 1.2 km | MPC · JPL |
| 361164 | 2006 KK_{23} | — | May 23, 2006 | Reedy Creek | J. Broughton | · | 730 m | MPC · JPL |
| 361165 | 2006 KD_{41} | — | May 19, 2006 | Mount Lemmon | Mount Lemmon Survey | · | 1.3 km | MPC · JPL |
| 361166 | 2006 KN_{64} | — | May 23, 2006 | Mount Lemmon | Mount Lemmon Survey | · | 1.6 km | MPC · JPL |
| 361167 | 2006 KY_{64} | — | May 23, 2006 | Mount Lemmon | Mount Lemmon Survey | NYS | 1 km | MPC · JPL |
| 361168 | 2006 KS_{81} | — | May 25, 2006 | Mount Lemmon | Mount Lemmon Survey | V | 710 m | MPC · JPL |
| 361169 | 2006 KC_{83} | — | May 20, 2006 | Anderson Mesa | LONEOS | · | 980 m | MPC · JPL |
| 361170 | 2006 KN_{92} | — | May 25, 2006 | Kitt Peak | Spacewatch | V | 690 m | MPC · JPL |
| 361171 | 2006 KH_{107} | — | May 31, 2006 | Mount Lemmon | Mount Lemmon Survey | · | 940 m | MPC · JPL |
| 361172 | 2006 KM_{107} | — | May 31, 2006 | Mount Lemmon | Mount Lemmon Survey | · | 1.4 km | MPC · JPL |
| 361173 | 2006 LZ_{5} | — | June 3, 2006 | Mount Lemmon | Mount Lemmon Survey | NYS | 1.4 km | MPC · JPL |
| 361174 | 2006 OF_{8} | — | July 20, 2006 | Palomar | NEAT | · | 1.2 km | MPC · JPL |
| 361175 | 2006 OV_{19} | — | July 20, 2006 | Siding Spring | SSS | fast | 1.9 km | MPC · JPL |
| 361176 | 2006 PF_{6} | — | November 5, 1999 | Kitt Peak | Spacewatch | · | 1.4 km | MPC · JPL |
| 361177 | 2006 PC_{16} | — | August 19, 2006 | Palomar | NEAT | · | 1.7 km | MPC · JPL |
| 361178 | 2006 PH_{18} | — | August 12, 2006 | Palomar | NEAT | · | 1.4 km | MPC · JPL |
| 361179 | 2006 PJ_{25} | — | August 13, 2006 | Palomar | NEAT | MAS | 790 m | MPC · JPL |
| 361180 | 2006 QK_{3} | — | August 17, 2006 | Palomar | NEAT | BAR | 1.6 km | MPC · JPL |
| 361181 | 2006 QL_{24} | — | August 17, 2006 | Palomar | NEAT | NYS | 1.4 km | MPC · JPL |
| 361182 | 2006 QV_{32} | — | August 22, 2006 | Palomar | NEAT | · | 1.3 km | MPC · JPL |
| 361183 Tandon | 2006 QB_{34} | Tandon | August 24, 2006 | Pises | Pises | · | 1.9 km | MPC · JPL |
| 361184 | 2006 QM_{38} | — | August 18, 2006 | Socorro | LINEAR | EUN | 1.7 km | MPC · JPL |
| 361185 | 2006 QP_{38} | — | August 18, 2006 | Anderson Mesa | LONEOS | · | 1.5 km | MPC · JPL |
| 361186 | 2006 QE_{41} | — | August 17, 2006 | Palomar | NEAT | · | 1.3 km | MPC · JPL |
| 361187 | 2006 QW_{70} | — | August 21, 2006 | Kitt Peak | Spacewatch | · | 1.8 km | MPC · JPL |
| 361188 | 2006 QD_{86} | — | August 27, 2006 | Kitt Peak | Spacewatch | · | 1.5 km | MPC · JPL |
| 361189 | 2006 QC_{133} | — | August 23, 2006 | Palomar | NEAT | · | 2.0 km | MPC · JPL |
| 361190 | 2006 QR_{136} | — | August 29, 2006 | Catalina | CSS | EUN | 1.5 km | MPC · JPL |
| 361191 | 2006 QF_{169} | — | August 30, 2006 | Anderson Mesa | LONEOS | · | 1.7 km | MPC · JPL |
| 361192 | 2006 QZ_{178} | — | August 21, 2006 | Kitt Peak | Spacewatch | · | 2.2 km | MPC · JPL |
| 361193 Cheungtaklung | 2006 QW_{184} | Cheungtaklung | August 29, 2006 | Lulin | Q. Ye, Lin, H.-C. | · | 1.9 km | MPC · JPL |
| 361194 | 2006 RK_{4} | — | September 12, 2006 | Catalina | CSS | · | 2.7 km | MPC · JPL |
| 361195 | 2006 RM_{5} | — | September 14, 2006 | Catalina | CSS | H | 560 m | MPC · JPL |
| 361196 | 2006 RX_{17} | — | September 14, 2006 | Palomar | NEAT | · | 2.4 km | MPC · JPL |
| 361197 | 2006 RN_{18} | — | September 14, 2006 | Catalina | CSS | · | 2.6 km | MPC · JPL |
| 361198 | 2006 RQ_{19} | — | September 14, 2006 | Palomar | NEAT | BAR | 1.2 km | MPC · JPL |
| 361199 | 2006 RR_{23} | — | September 13, 2006 | Palomar | NEAT | MAR | 1.1 km | MPC · JPL |
| 361200 | 2006 RU_{25} | — | September 14, 2006 | Kitt Peak | Spacewatch | · | 1.9 km | MPC · JPL |

== 361201–361300 ==
back to top

| Designation | | | Discovery | | | Properties | | Ref |
| Permanent | Provisional | Named after | Date | Site | Discoverer(s) | Category | Diam. | Ref |
|---|---|---|---|---|---|---|---|---|
| 361201 | 2006 RQ_{32} | — | September 15, 2006 | Kitt Peak | Spacewatch | · | 2.1 km | MPC · JPL |
| 361202 | 2006 RZ_{33} | — | September 12, 2006 | Catalina | CSS | · | 2.2 km | MPC · JPL |
| 361203 | 2006 RE_{39} | — | September 14, 2006 | Catalina | CSS | EUN | 1.4 km | MPC · JPL |
| 361204 | 2006 RX_{45} | — | September 14, 2006 | Kitt Peak | Spacewatch | · | 1.5 km | MPC · JPL |
| 361205 | 2006 RA_{75} | — | September 15, 2006 | Kitt Peak | Spacewatch | H | 440 m | MPC · JPL |
| 361206 | 2006 RF_{78} | — | September 15, 2006 | Kitt Peak | Spacewatch | · | 2.0 km | MPC · JPL |
| 361207 | 2006 RZ_{85} | — | September 15, 2006 | Kitt Peak | Spacewatch | · | 1.5 km | MPC · JPL |
| 361208 | 2006 RK_{89} | — | September 15, 2006 | Kitt Peak | Spacewatch | · | 1.5 km | MPC · JPL |
| 361209 | 2006 RH_{91} | — | September 15, 2006 | Kitt Peak | Spacewatch | · | 1.7 km | MPC · JPL |
| 361210 | 2006 RN_{94} | — | September 15, 2006 | Kitt Peak | Spacewatch | (5) | 1.6 km | MPC · JPL |
| 361211 | 2006 RR_{95} | — | September 15, 2006 | Kitt Peak | Spacewatch | · | 1.8 km | MPC · JPL |
| 361212 | 2006 SK_{1} | — | September 16, 2006 | Kitt Peak | Spacewatch | · | 2.2 km | MPC · JPL |
| 361213 | 2006 SA_{12} | — | September 16, 2006 | Catalina | CSS | H | 630 m | MPC · JPL |
| 361214 | 2006 SO_{18} | — | September 17, 2006 | Kitt Peak | Spacewatch | · | 2.7 km | MPC · JPL |
| 361215 | 2006 SM_{32} | — | September 17, 2006 | Kitt Peak | Spacewatch | · | 1.8 km | MPC · JPL |
| 361216 | 2006 SY_{39} | — | September 18, 2006 | Catalina | CSS | · | 4.3 km | MPC · JPL |
| 361217 | 2006 SL_{44} | — | September 17, 2006 | Catalina | CSS | · | 1.5 km | MPC · JPL |
| 361218 | 2006 SL_{50} | — | September 16, 2006 | Catalina | CSS | · | 1.6 km | MPC · JPL |
| 361219 | 2006 SW_{70} | — | September 19, 2006 | Kitt Peak | Spacewatch | · | 1.9 km | MPC · JPL |
| 361220 | 2006 SD_{87} | — | September 18, 2006 | Kitt Peak | Spacewatch | · | 1.6 km | MPC · JPL |
| 361221 | 2006 SU_{88} | — | September 18, 2006 | Kitt Peak | Spacewatch | · | 1.1 km | MPC · JPL |
| 361222 | 2006 SB_{96} | — | September 18, 2006 | Kitt Peak | Spacewatch | · | 1.8 km | MPC · JPL |
| 361223 | 2006 SS_{98} | — | September 18, 2006 | Kitt Peak | Spacewatch | (5) | 1.1 km | MPC · JPL |
| 361224 | 2006 SH_{99} | — | September 18, 2006 | Kitt Peak | Spacewatch | · | 1.4 km | MPC · JPL |
| 361225 | 2006 SW_{106} | — | September 19, 2006 | Kitt Peak | Spacewatch | · | 1.8 km | MPC · JPL |
| 361226 | 2006 SA_{108} | — | September 19, 2006 | Anderson Mesa | LONEOS | · | 2.1 km | MPC · JPL |
| 361227 | 2006 SG_{113} | — | September 23, 2006 | Kitt Peak | Spacewatch | · | 1.3 km | MPC · JPL |
| 361228 | 2006 SH_{124} | — | September 19, 2006 | Catalina | CSS | · | 2.3 km | MPC · JPL |
| 361229 | 2006 SB_{127} | — | September 22, 2006 | Catalina | CSS | H | 650 m | MPC · JPL |
| 361230 | 2006 SB_{133} | — | September 16, 2006 | Catalina | CSS | · | 2.4 km | MPC · JPL |
| 361231 | 2006 ST_{152} | — | September 19, 2006 | Kitt Peak | Spacewatch | · | 1.9 km | MPC · JPL |
| 361232 | 2006 SL_{165} | — | September 25, 2006 | Kitt Peak | Spacewatch | · | 1.4 km | MPC · JPL |
| 361233 | 2006 SF_{167} | — | September 25, 2006 | Kitt Peak | Spacewatch | · | 1.2 km | MPC · JPL |
| 361234 | 2006 SO_{170} | — | September 25, 2006 | Kitt Peak | Spacewatch | · | 1.1 km | MPC · JPL |
| 361235 | 2006 SG_{179} | — | September 25, 2006 | Kitt Peak | Spacewatch | · | 2.3 km | MPC · JPL |
| 361236 | 2006 SM_{184} | — | September 25, 2006 | Kitt Peak | Spacewatch | GEF | 900 m | MPC · JPL |
| 361237 | 2006 SZ_{196} | — | September 26, 2006 | Mount Lemmon | Mount Lemmon Survey | JUN | 1.1 km | MPC · JPL |
| 361238 | 2006 SO_{207} | — | September 25, 2006 | Kitt Peak | Spacewatch | · | 1.7 km | MPC · JPL |
| 361239 | 2006 SQ_{212} | — | September 26, 2006 | Kitt Peak | Spacewatch | · | 2.2 km | MPC · JPL |
| 361240 | 2006 SR_{223} | — | September 25, 2006 | Kitt Peak | Spacewatch | NEM | 2.8 km | MPC · JPL |
| 361241 | 2006 SG_{229} | — | September 18, 2006 | Catalina | CSS | · | 1.6 km | MPC · JPL |
| 361242 | 2006 SV_{232} | — | September 26, 2006 | Kitt Peak | Spacewatch | · | 1.3 km | MPC · JPL |
| 361243 | 2006 SX_{249} | — | September 26, 2006 | Kitt Peak | Spacewatch | · | 1.3 km | MPC · JPL |
| 361244 | 2006 SO_{252} | — | September 26, 2006 | Kitt Peak | Spacewatch | · | 1.8 km | MPC · JPL |
| 361245 | 2006 SB_{260} | — | September 26, 2006 | Kitt Peak | Spacewatch | · | 1.2 km | MPC · JPL |
| 361246 | 2006 SE_{260} | — | September 26, 2006 | Kitt Peak | Spacewatch | MAR | 880 m | MPC · JPL |
| 361247 | 2006 SC_{262} | — | September 26, 2006 | Mount Lemmon | Mount Lemmon Survey | · | 1.6 km | MPC · JPL |
| 361248 | 2006 SE_{263} | — | September 26, 2006 | Kitt Peak | Spacewatch | · | 2.1 km | MPC · JPL |
| 361249 | 2006 SY_{263} | — | September 26, 2006 | Kitt Peak | Spacewatch | · | 1.8 km | MPC · JPL |
| 361250 | 2006 SV_{273} | — | September 27, 2006 | Mount Lemmon | Mount Lemmon Survey | HOF | 2.8 km | MPC · JPL |
| 361251 | 2006 SY_{273} | — | September 27, 2006 | Mount Lemmon | Mount Lemmon Survey | BRA | 1.7 km | MPC · JPL |
| 361252 | 2006 SJ_{279} | — | September 28, 2006 | Kitt Peak | Spacewatch | HNS | 1.6 km | MPC · JPL |
| 361253 | 2006 SA_{301} | — | September 26, 2006 | Mount Lemmon | Mount Lemmon Survey | · | 1.8 km | MPC · JPL |
| 361254 | 2006 SN_{316} | — | September 27, 2006 | Kitt Peak | Spacewatch | · | 2.9 km | MPC · JPL |
| 361255 | 2006 SY_{317} | — | September 27, 2006 | Kitt Peak | Spacewatch | MRX | 1.1 km | MPC · JPL |
| 361256 | 2006 SK_{318} | — | September 27, 2006 | Kitt Peak | Spacewatch | · | 1.6 km | MPC · JPL |
| 361257 | 2006 SS_{322} | — | September 27, 2006 | Kitt Peak | Spacewatch | HNS | 1.3 km | MPC · JPL |
| 361258 | 2006 SY_{327} | — | September 27, 2006 | Kitt Peak | Spacewatch | · | 1.4 km | MPC · JPL |
| 361259 | 2006 SS_{335} | — | September 28, 2006 | Kitt Peak | Spacewatch | · | 1.5 km | MPC · JPL |
| 361260 | 2006 SG_{342} | — | September 28, 2006 | Kitt Peak | Spacewatch | · | 1.1 km | MPC · JPL |
| 361261 | 2006 SS_{353} | — | September 30, 2006 | Catalina | CSS | · | 1.8 km | MPC · JPL |
| 361262 | 2006 SE_{357} | — | September 30, 2006 | Catalina | CSS | · | 1.8 km | MPC · JPL |
| 361263 | 2006 SD_{366} | — | September 30, 2006 | Catalina | CSS | · | 2.7 km | MPC · JPL |
| 361264 | 2006 SB_{370} | — | September 18, 2006 | La Sagra | OAM | · | 1.6 km | MPC · JPL |
| 361265 | 2006 SS_{372} | — | September 30, 2006 | Catalina | CSS | · | 2.1 km | MPC · JPL |
| 361266 | 2006 SA_{376} | — | September 17, 2006 | Apache Point | A. C. Becker | · | 2.4 km | MPC · JPL |
| 361267 ʻIʻiwi | 2006 SV_{395} | ʻIʻiwi | September 17, 2006 | Mauna Kea | Masiero, J. | · | 1.5 km | MPC · JPL |
| 361268 | 2006 SU_{398} | — | September 17, 2006 | Kitt Peak | Spacewatch | NEM | 2.2 km | MPC · JPL |
| 361269 | 2006 SR_{399} | — | September 18, 2006 | Catalina | CSS | · | 1.6 km | MPC · JPL |
| 361270 | 2006 SD_{404} | — | September 30, 2006 | Mount Lemmon | Mount Lemmon Survey | · | 1.5 km | MPC · JPL |
| 361271 | 2006 SK_{405} | — | September 17, 2006 | Kitt Peak | Spacewatch | · | 1.7 km | MPC · JPL |
| 361272 | 2006 SD_{407} | — | September 18, 2006 | Catalina | CSS | · | 2.0 km | MPC · JPL |
| 361273 | 2006 SV_{407} | — | September 25, 2006 | Mount Lemmon | Mount Lemmon Survey | · | 2.4 km | MPC · JPL |
| 361274 | 2006 SQ_{411} | — | September 18, 2006 | Catalina | CSS | · | 2.5 km | MPC · JPL |
| 361275 | 2006 TC_{4} | — | October 2, 2006 | Mount Lemmon | Mount Lemmon Survey | · | 1.9 km | MPC · JPL |
| 361276 | 2006 TA_{12} | — | October 3, 2006 | Kitt Peak | Spacewatch | · | 2.1 km | MPC · JPL |
| 361277 | 2006 TX_{12} | — | September 28, 2006 | Catalina | CSS | EUN | 1.7 km | MPC · JPL |
| 361278 | 2006 TD_{18} | — | October 11, 2006 | Kitt Peak | Spacewatch | · | 2.0 km | MPC · JPL |
| 361279 | 2006 TV_{18} | — | October 11, 2006 | Kitt Peak | Spacewatch | BRG | 2.1 km | MPC · JPL |
| 361280 | 2006 TC_{19} | — | October 11, 2006 | Kitt Peak | Spacewatch | · | 2.0 km | MPC · JPL |
| 361281 | 2006 TR_{29} | — | October 12, 2006 | Kitt Peak | Spacewatch | · | 1.9 km | MPC · JPL |
| 361282 | 2006 TC_{31} | — | October 12, 2006 | Kitt Peak | Spacewatch | · | 1.9 km | MPC · JPL |
| 361283 | 2006 TP_{31} | — | October 12, 2006 | Kitt Peak | Spacewatch | · | 1.9 km | MPC · JPL |
| 361284 | 2006 TS_{34} | — | October 12, 2006 | Kitt Peak | Spacewatch | WIT | 1.2 km | MPC · JPL |
| 361285 | 2006 TY_{34} | — | October 12, 2006 | Kitt Peak | Spacewatch | PAD | 1.6 km | MPC · JPL |
| 361286 | 2006 TB_{35} | — | October 12, 2006 | Kitt Peak | Spacewatch | · | 1.6 km | MPC · JPL |
| 361287 | 2006 TX_{35} | — | October 12, 2006 | Kitt Peak | Spacewatch | · | 2.4 km | MPC · JPL |
| 361288 | 2006 TL_{40} | — | October 12, 2006 | Kitt Peak | Spacewatch | · | 1.9 km | MPC · JPL |
| 361289 | 2006 TV_{41} | — | October 12, 2006 | Kitt Peak | Spacewatch | · | 1.2 km | MPC · JPL |
| 361290 | 2006 TQ_{47} | — | October 12, 2006 | Kitt Peak | Spacewatch | AST | 1.8 km | MPC · JPL |
| 361291 | 2006 TW_{47} | — | October 12, 2006 | Kitt Peak | Spacewatch | · | 2.3 km | MPC · JPL |
| 361292 | 2006 TA_{49} | — | October 12, 2006 | Palomar | NEAT | · | 1.9 km | MPC · JPL |
| 361293 | 2006 TV_{52} | — | October 12, 2006 | Kitt Peak | Spacewatch | AST | 1.9 km | MPC · JPL |
| 361294 | 2006 TN_{55} | — | October 12, 2006 | Palomar | NEAT | H | 550 m | MPC · JPL |
| 361295 | 2006 TY_{57} | — | October 15, 2006 | Catalina | CSS | · | 2.2 km | MPC · JPL |
| 361296 | 2006 TX_{58} | — | October 13, 2006 | Kitt Peak | Spacewatch | NEM | 2.3 km | MPC · JPL |
| 361297 | 2006 TL_{63} | — | October 10, 2006 | Palomar | NEAT | · | 1.7 km | MPC · JPL |
| 361298 | 2006 TN_{78} | — | October 12, 2006 | Kitt Peak | Spacewatch | · | 2.2 km | MPC · JPL |
| 361299 | 2006 TX_{79} | — | October 13, 2006 | Kitt Peak | Spacewatch | · | 2.0 km | MPC · JPL |
| 361300 | 2006 TM_{80} | — | October 13, 2006 | Kitt Peak | Spacewatch | HNS | 2.0 km | MPC · JPL |

== 361301–361400 ==
back to top

| Designation | | | Discovery | | | Properties | | Ref |
| Permanent | Provisional | Named after | Date | Site | Discoverer(s) | Category | Diam. | Ref |
|---|---|---|---|---|---|---|---|---|
| 361301 | 2006 TF_{91} | — | October 13, 2006 | Kitt Peak | Spacewatch | · | 1.7 km | MPC · JPL |
| 361302 | 2006 TZ_{100} | — | October 15, 2006 | Kitt Peak | Spacewatch | · | 2.0 km | MPC · JPL |
| 361303 | 2006 TB_{104} | — | October 15, 2006 | Kitt Peak | Spacewatch | · | 2.1 km | MPC · JPL |
| 361304 | 2006 TV_{108} | — | October 12, 2006 | Siding Spring | SSS | H | 730 m | MPC · JPL |
| 361305 | 2006 TH_{121} | — | October 12, 2006 | Apache Point | A. C. Becker | · | 1.9 km | MPC · JPL |
| 361306 | 2006 TM_{122} | — | October 4, 2006 | Mount Lemmon | Mount Lemmon Survey | · | 2.4 km | MPC · JPL |
| 361307 | 2006 TW_{123} | — | October 2, 2006 | Mount Lemmon | Mount Lemmon Survey | · | 1.3 km | MPC · JPL |
| 361308 | 2006 UV | — | October 16, 2006 | Altschwendt | W. Ries | · | 1.3 km | MPC · JPL |
| 361309 | 2006 UW_{4} | — | October 16, 2006 | Kitt Peak | Spacewatch | WIT | 1.1 km | MPC · JPL |
| 361310 | 2006 UO_{5} | — | October 16, 2006 | Catalina | CSS | HNS | 1.7 km | MPC · JPL |
| 361311 | 2006 UT_{6} | — | October 16, 2006 | Catalina | CSS | · | 2.5 km | MPC · JPL |
| 361312 | 2006 UG_{10} | — | October 17, 2006 | Kitt Peak | Spacewatch | · | 1.7 km | MPC · JPL |
| 361313 | 2006 UX_{17} | — | October 16, 2006 | Catalina | CSS | H | 540 m | MPC · JPL |
| 361314 | 2006 UZ_{19} | — | October 16, 2006 | Kitt Peak | Spacewatch | WIT | 980 m | MPC · JPL |
| 361315 | 2006 UJ_{25} | — | October 16, 2006 | Kitt Peak | Spacewatch | · | 1.7 km | MPC · JPL |
| 361316 | 2006 UH_{28} | — | October 16, 2006 | Kitt Peak | Spacewatch | · | 1.8 km | MPC · JPL |
| 361317 | 2006 UC_{31} | — | October 16, 2006 | Kitt Peak | Spacewatch | · | 1.8 km | MPC · JPL |
| 361318 | 2006 UU_{31} | — | September 27, 2006 | Mount Lemmon | Mount Lemmon Survey | · | 2.1 km | MPC · JPL |
| 361319 | 2006 UG_{34} | — | October 16, 2006 | Kitt Peak | Spacewatch | PAD | 1.4 km | MPC · JPL |
| 361320 | 2006 UL_{35} | — | September 30, 2006 | Catalina | CSS | H | 720 m | MPC · JPL |
| 361321 | 2006 UU_{35} | — | October 16, 2006 | Kitt Peak | Spacewatch | WIT | 1.0 km | MPC · JPL |
| 361322 | 2006 UR_{38} | — | October 16, 2006 | Kitt Peak | Spacewatch | · | 2.0 km | MPC · JPL |
| 361323 | 2006 UK_{42} | — | October 16, 2006 | Kitt Peak | Spacewatch | HOF | 2.5 km | MPC · JPL |
| 361324 | 2006 UU_{42} | — | October 16, 2006 | Kitt Peak | Spacewatch | · | 2.3 km | MPC · JPL |
| 361325 | 2006 UE_{50} | — | October 17, 2006 | Kitt Peak | Spacewatch | · | 1.7 km | MPC · JPL |
| 361326 | 2006 UL_{52} | — | October 17, 2006 | Mount Lemmon | Mount Lemmon Survey | · | 1.2 km | MPC · JPL |
| 361327 | 2006 UX_{57} | — | October 18, 2006 | Kitt Peak | Spacewatch | · | 2.3 km | MPC · JPL |
| 361328 | 2006 UK_{59} | — | October 19, 2006 | Kitt Peak | Spacewatch | · | 1.5 km | MPC · JPL |
| 361329 | 2006 UU_{61} | — | October 17, 2006 | Andrushivka | Andrushivka | · | 1.9 km | MPC · JPL |
| 361330 | 2006 UJ_{65} | — | October 16, 2006 | Kitt Peak | Spacewatch | WIT | 1.0 km | MPC · JPL |
| 361331 | 2006 UC_{66} | — | September 17, 2006 | Kitt Peak | Spacewatch | (5) | 1.4 km | MPC · JPL |
| 361332 | 2006 UJ_{72} | — | October 17, 2006 | Kitt Peak | Spacewatch | HNS | 1.1 km | MPC · JPL |
| 361333 | 2006 UJ_{79} | — | October 17, 2006 | Kitt Peak | Spacewatch | ADE | 2.1 km | MPC · JPL |
| 361334 | 2006 UZ_{85} | — | October 17, 2006 | Kitt Peak | Spacewatch | (5) | 1.3 km | MPC · JPL |
| 361335 | 2006 UY_{90} | — | October 17, 2006 | Kitt Peak | Spacewatch | MRX | 1.2 km | MPC · JPL |
| 361336 | 2006 UK_{93} | — | October 18, 2006 | Kitt Peak | Spacewatch | · | 1.8 km | MPC · JPL |
| 361337 | 2006 UG_{95} | — | October 2, 2006 | Mount Lemmon | Mount Lemmon Survey | (12739) | 1.5 km | MPC · JPL |
| 361338 | 2006 UA_{96} | — | October 18, 2006 | Kitt Peak | Spacewatch | · | 1.8 km | MPC · JPL |
| 361339 | 2006 UT_{100} | — | October 18, 2006 | Kitt Peak | Spacewatch | · | 2.1 km | MPC · JPL |
| 361340 | 2006 UT_{112} | — | October 19, 2006 | Kitt Peak | Spacewatch | PAD | 1.7 km | MPC · JPL |
| 361341 | 2006 UC_{124} | — | October 19, 2006 | Kitt Peak | Spacewatch | NEM | 2.2 km | MPC · JPL |
| 361342 | 2006 UO_{127} | — | October 19, 2006 | Kitt Peak | Spacewatch | · | 2.8 km | MPC · JPL |
| 361343 | 2006 UF_{133} | — | October 19, 2006 | Kitt Peak | Spacewatch | · | 3.2 km | MPC · JPL |
| 361344 | 2006 UQ_{134} | — | October 19, 2006 | Kitt Peak | Spacewatch | · | 1.8 km | MPC · JPL |
| 361345 | 2006 UA_{135} | — | October 19, 2006 | Kitt Peak | Spacewatch | · | 2.0 km | MPC · JPL |
| 361346 | 2006 UK_{154} | — | October 21, 2006 | Mount Lemmon | Mount Lemmon Survey | · | 2.8 km | MPC · JPL |
| 361347 | 2006 UJ_{157} | — | September 19, 2006 | Kitt Peak | Spacewatch | · | 1.8 km | MPC · JPL |
| 361348 | 2006 UW_{168} | — | October 21, 2006 | Mount Lemmon | Mount Lemmon Survey | · | 2.0 km | MPC · JPL |
| 361349 | 2006 UW_{184} | — | October 24, 2006 | Kitami | K. Endate | · | 1.9 km | MPC · JPL |
| 361350 | 2006 UQ_{187} | — | October 19, 2006 | Catalina | CSS | · | 1.2 km | MPC · JPL |
| 361351 | 2006 UY_{197} | — | October 20, 2006 | Kitt Peak | Spacewatch | · | 1.6 km | MPC · JPL |
| 361352 | 2006 UH_{200} | — | October 21, 2006 | Kitt Peak | Spacewatch | · | 2.5 km | MPC · JPL |
| 361353 | 2006 UB_{204} | — | October 22, 2006 | Palomar | NEAT | · | 3.3 km | MPC · JPL |
| 361354 | 2006 UX_{211} | — | October 23, 2006 | Kitt Peak | Spacewatch | · | 1.8 km | MPC · JPL |
| 361355 | 2006 UZ_{211} | — | October 23, 2006 | Kitt Peak | Spacewatch | HOF | 2.4 km | MPC · JPL |
| 361356 | 2006 UX_{217} | — | October 21, 2006 | Mount Lemmon | Mount Lemmon Survey | · | 960 m | MPC · JPL |
| 361357 | 2006 UN_{218} | — | October 30, 2006 | Mount Nyukasa | Japan Aerospace Exploration Agency | · | 1.5 km | MPC · JPL |
| 361358 | 2006 US_{219} | — | October 16, 2006 | Catalina | CSS | · | 1.8 km | MPC · JPL |
| 361359 | 2006 UZ_{223} | — | October 19, 2006 | Palomar | NEAT | · | 1.9 km | MPC · JPL |
| 361360 | 2006 UX_{225} | — | October 20, 2006 | Palomar | NEAT | · | 2.0 km | MPC · JPL |
| 361361 | 2006 UA_{238} | — | October 23, 2006 | Kitt Peak | Spacewatch | · | 1.7 km | MPC · JPL |
| 361362 | 2006 UE_{247} | — | October 20, 2006 | Kitt Peak | Spacewatch | · | 1.7 km | MPC · JPL |
| 361363 | 2006 UX_{259} | — | October 28, 2006 | Mount Lemmon | Mount Lemmon Survey | · | 1.9 km | MPC · JPL |
| 361364 | 2006 UJ_{260} | — | October 28, 2006 | Mount Lemmon | Mount Lemmon Survey | · | 2.4 km | MPC · JPL |
| 361365 | 2006 UR_{263} | — | October 27, 2006 | Kitt Peak | Spacewatch | · | 1.6 km | MPC · JPL |
| 361366 | 2006 UD_{264} | — | October 27, 2006 | Kitt Peak | Spacewatch | · | 1.4 km | MPC · JPL |
| 361367 | 2006 UC_{271} | — | October 27, 2006 | Kitt Peak | Spacewatch | · | 2.8 km | MPC · JPL |
| 361368 | 2006 UF_{275} | — | October 28, 2006 | Kitt Peak | Spacewatch | · | 1.7 km | MPC · JPL |
| 361369 | 2006 UB_{276} | — | September 26, 2006 | Mount Lemmon | Mount Lemmon Survey | · | 2.1 km | MPC · JPL |
| 361370 | 2006 UL_{281} | — | October 28, 2006 | Mount Lemmon | Mount Lemmon Survey | · | 2.6 km | MPC · JPL |
| 361371 | 2006 UP_{299} | — | October 19, 2006 | Kitt Peak | M. W. Buie | · | 1.5 km | MPC · JPL |
| 361372 | 2006 UL_{318} | — | October 19, 2006 | Kitt Peak | M. W. Buie | · | 2.2 km | MPC · JPL |
| 361373 | 2006 UY_{332} | — | October 21, 2006 | Apache Point | A. C. Becker | · | 2.6 km | MPC · JPL |
| 361374 | 2006 UY_{338} | — | October 31, 2006 | Mount Lemmon | Mount Lemmon Survey | · | 1.6 km | MPC · JPL |
| 361375 | 2006 VN_{3} | — | November 9, 2006 | Kitt Peak | Spacewatch | · | 1.7 km | MPC · JPL |
| 361376 | 2006 VU_{20} | — | November 9, 2006 | Kitt Peak | Spacewatch | · | 1.8 km | MPC · JPL |
| 361377 | 2006 VN_{23} | — | October 19, 2006 | Mount Lemmon | Mount Lemmon Survey | · | 2.1 km | MPC · JPL |
| 361378 | 2006 VY_{26} | — | November 10, 2006 | Kitt Peak | Spacewatch | HOF | 2.8 km | MPC · JPL |
| 361379 | 2006 VK_{38} | — | November 12, 2006 | Mount Lemmon | Mount Lemmon Survey | · | 1.4 km | MPC · JPL |
| 361380 | 2006 VF_{39} | — | November 12, 2006 | Mount Lemmon | Mount Lemmon Survey | · | 1.7 km | MPC · JPL |
| 361381 | 2006 VA_{49} | — | November 10, 2006 | Kitt Peak | Spacewatch | · | 1.7 km | MPC · JPL |
| 361382 | 2006 VS_{51} | — | November 10, 2006 | Kitt Peak | Spacewatch | · | 2.7 km | MPC · JPL |
| 361383 | 2006 VY_{53} | — | November 11, 2006 | Kitt Peak | Spacewatch | · | 2.0 km | MPC · JPL |
| 361384 | 2006 VL_{56} | — | November 11, 2006 | Kitt Peak | Spacewatch | AST | 2.0 km | MPC · JPL |
| 361385 | 2006 VT_{60} | — | November 11, 2006 | Kitt Peak | Spacewatch | · | 2.1 km | MPC · JPL |
| 361386 | 2006 VO_{70} | — | November 11, 2006 | Kitt Peak | Spacewatch | · | 1.6 km | MPC · JPL |
| 361387 | 2006 VN_{72} | — | October 28, 2006 | Mount Lemmon | Mount Lemmon Survey | AGN | 1.3 km | MPC · JPL |
| 361388 | 2006 VD_{85} | — | November 13, 2006 | Catalina | CSS | · | 3.1 km | MPC · JPL |
| 361389 | 2006 VX_{91} | — | November 15, 2006 | Mount Lemmon | Mount Lemmon Survey | GEF | 1.4 km | MPC · JPL |
| 361390 | 2006 VY_{103} | — | November 13, 2006 | Kitt Peak | Spacewatch | · | 1.7 km | MPC · JPL |
| 361391 | 2006 VL_{105} | — | November 13, 2006 | Kitt Peak | Spacewatch | · | 2.1 km | MPC · JPL |
| 361392 | 2006 VF_{119} | — | November 14, 2006 | Mount Lemmon | Mount Lemmon Survey | · | 2.2 km | MPC · JPL |
| 361393 | 2006 VQ_{121} | — | November 14, 2006 | Mount Lemmon | Mount Lemmon Survey | NEM | 2.3 km | MPC · JPL |
| 361394 | 2006 VX_{126} | — | November 15, 2006 | Kitt Peak | Spacewatch | · | 2.4 km | MPC · JPL |
| 361395 | 2006 VM_{140} | — | November 15, 2006 | Kitt Peak | Spacewatch | · | 2.4 km | MPC · JPL |
| 361396 | 2006 VC_{142} | — | November 14, 2006 | Kitt Peak | Spacewatch | AGN | 1.3 km | MPC · JPL |
| 361397 | 2006 WL_{21} | — | November 2, 2006 | Mount Lemmon | Mount Lemmon Survey | (5) | 1.7 km | MPC · JPL |
| 361398 | 2006 WM_{27} | — | November 17, 2006 | Catalina | CSS | H | 910 m | MPC · JPL |
| 361399 | 2006 WO_{31} | — | November 16, 2006 | Kitt Peak | Spacewatch | · | 1.8 km | MPC · JPL |
| 361400 | 2006 WZ_{31} | — | November 16, 2006 | Kitt Peak | Spacewatch | · | 1.9 km | MPC · JPL |

== 361401–361500 ==
back to top

| Designation | | | Discovery | | | Properties | | Ref |
| Permanent | Provisional | Named after | Date | Site | Discoverer(s) | Category | Diam. | Ref |
|---|---|---|---|---|---|---|---|---|
| 361401 | 2006 WL_{37} | — | November 16, 2006 | Kitt Peak | Spacewatch | AGN | 1.1 km | MPC · JPL |
| 361402 | 2006 WQ_{37} | — | November 16, 2006 | Kitt Peak | Spacewatch | · | 2.0 km | MPC · JPL |
| 361403 | 2006 WK_{38} | — | March 16, 2004 | Kitt Peak | Spacewatch | · | 2.1 km | MPC · JPL |
| 361404 | 2006 WJ_{66} | — | November 17, 2006 | Mount Lemmon | Mount Lemmon Survey | · | 2.4 km | MPC · JPL |
| 361405 | 2006 WC_{69} | — | November 17, 2006 | Kitt Peak | Spacewatch | · | 3.5 km | MPC · JPL |
| 361406 | 2006 WZ_{75} | — | November 18, 2006 | Kitt Peak | Spacewatch | · | 2.0 km | MPC · JPL |
| 361407 | 2006 WL_{86} | — | November 18, 2006 | Socorro | LINEAR | EUN | 2.1 km | MPC · JPL |
| 361408 | 2006 WC_{94} | — | November 19, 2006 | Kitt Peak | Spacewatch | · | 2.3 km | MPC · JPL |
| 361409 | 2006 WK_{99} | — | November 19, 2006 | Kitt Peak | Spacewatch | AGN | 1.2 km | MPC · JPL |
| 361410 | 2006 WN_{104} | — | October 31, 2006 | Mount Lemmon | Mount Lemmon Survey | AGN | 1.1 km | MPC · JPL |
| 361411 | 2006 WO_{106} | — | November 19, 2006 | Kitt Peak | Spacewatch | KOR | 1.4 km | MPC · JPL |
| 361412 | 2006 WY_{123} | — | November 22, 2006 | Kitt Peak | Spacewatch | · | 2.3 km | MPC · JPL |
| 361413 | 2006 WQ_{130} | — | November 17, 2006 | Catalina | CSS | H | 550 m | MPC · JPL |
| 361414 | 2006 WD_{141} | — | November 20, 2006 | Kitt Peak | Spacewatch | · | 1.5 km | MPC · JPL |
| 361415 | 2006 WN_{152} | — | November 21, 2006 | Mount Lemmon | Mount Lemmon Survey | · | 1.4 km | MPC · JPL |
| 361416 | 2006 WE_{161} | — | November 23, 2006 | Kitt Peak | Spacewatch | · | 2.4 km | MPC · JPL |
| 361417 | 2006 WQ_{163} | — | November 23, 2006 | Kitt Peak | Spacewatch | EUN | 1.3 km | MPC · JPL |
| 361418 | 2006 WB_{165} | — | November 23, 2006 | Kitt Peak | Spacewatch | KOR | 1.3 km | MPC · JPL |
| 361419 | 2006 WR_{175} | — | November 23, 2006 | Mount Lemmon | Mount Lemmon Survey | · | 1.9 km | MPC · JPL |
| 361420 | 2006 WE_{181} | — | November 24, 2006 | Mount Lemmon | Mount Lemmon Survey | · | 1.9 km | MPC · JPL |
| 361421 | 2006 WL_{183} | — | November 17, 2006 | Kitt Peak | Spacewatch | · | 2.7 km | MPC · JPL |
| 361422 | 2006 XS_{3} | — | December 12, 2006 | Palomar | NEAT | H | 800 m | MPC · JPL |
| 361423 | 2006 XC_{7} | — | December 9, 2006 | Kitt Peak | Spacewatch | · | 1.8 km | MPC · JPL |
| 361424 | 2006 XJ_{8} | — | December 9, 2006 | Kitt Peak | Spacewatch | · | 3.6 km | MPC · JPL |
| 361425 | 2006 XU_{18} | — | December 11, 2006 | Socorro | LINEAR | H | 610 m | MPC · JPL |
| 361426 | 2006 XZ_{27} | — | December 13, 2006 | Mount Lemmon | Mount Lemmon Survey | · | 1.7 km | MPC · JPL |
| 361427 | 2006 XK_{28} | — | December 13, 2006 | Mount Lemmon | Mount Lemmon Survey | · | 2.7 km | MPC · JPL |
| 361428 | 2006 XD_{56} | — | December 13, 2006 | Mount Lemmon | Mount Lemmon Survey | · | 2.9 km | MPC · JPL |
| 361429 | 2006 YQ_{2} | — | December 21, 2006 | Mount Lemmon | Mount Lemmon Survey | · | 2.4 km | MPC · JPL |
| 361430 | 2006 YU_{16} | — | December 21, 2006 | Mount Lemmon | Mount Lemmon Survey | H | 710 m | MPC · JPL |
| 361431 | 2006 YP_{18} | — | December 23, 2006 | Catalina | CSS | · | 2.5 km | MPC · JPL |
| 361432 | 2006 YE_{25} | — | December 21, 2006 | Kitt Peak | Spacewatch | EOS | 2.5 km | MPC · JPL |
| 361433 | 2006 YO_{53} | — | December 24, 2006 | Kitt Peak | Spacewatch | EOS | 2.1 km | MPC · JPL |
| 361434 | 2007 AS_{8} | — | January 10, 2007 | Mount Nyukasa | Japan Aerospace Exploration Agency | · | 2.9 km | MPC · JPL |
| 361435 | 2007 AY_{8} | — | January 10, 2007 | Kitt Peak | Spacewatch | · | 2.2 km | MPC · JPL |
| 361436 | 2007 AT_{17} | — | January 15, 2007 | Anderson Mesa | LONEOS | T_{j} (2.99) | 4.3 km | MPC · JPL |
| 361437 | 2007 AQ_{20} | — | January 10, 2007 | Kitt Peak | Spacewatch | · | 3.0 km | MPC · JPL |
| 361438 | 2007 AJ_{21} | — | January 10, 2007 | Mount Lemmon | Mount Lemmon Survey | · | 3.1 km | MPC · JPL |
| 361439 | 2007 BP_{2} | — | January 17, 2007 | Kitt Peak | Spacewatch | · | 2.2 km | MPC · JPL |
| 361440 | 2007 BN_{13} | — | January 17, 2007 | Kitt Peak | Spacewatch | · | 1.6 km | MPC · JPL |
| 361441 | 2007 BA_{14} | — | January 17, 2007 | Kitt Peak | Spacewatch | · | 2.1 km | MPC · JPL |
| 361442 | 2007 BX_{15} | — | January 17, 2007 | Kitt Peak | Spacewatch | THM | 1.8 km | MPC · JPL |
| 361443 | 2007 BL_{24} | — | January 24, 2007 | Mount Lemmon | Mount Lemmon Survey | THM | 2.1 km | MPC · JPL |
| 361444 | 2007 BG_{30} | — | January 24, 2007 | Catalina | CSS | EOS | 2.3 km | MPC · JPL |
| 361445 | 2007 BA_{40} | — | January 24, 2007 | Mount Lemmon | Mount Lemmon Survey | · | 2.5 km | MPC · JPL |
| 361446 | 2007 BC_{48} | — | January 17, 2007 | Kitt Peak | Spacewatch | · | 2.9 km | MPC · JPL |
| 361447 | 2007 BD_{66} | — | January 27, 2007 | Mount Lemmon | Mount Lemmon Survey | · | 2.8 km | MPC · JPL |
| 361448 | 2007 BB_{71} | — | January 28, 2007 | Mount Lemmon | Mount Lemmon Survey | EOS | 1.8 km | MPC · JPL |
| 361449 | 2007 BD_{71} | — | January 28, 2007 | Mount Lemmon | Mount Lemmon Survey | · | 2.8 km | MPC · JPL |
| 361450 Houellebecq | 2007 BM_{73} | Houellebecq | January 21, 2007 | Nogales | J.-C. Merlin | · | 2.9 km | MPC · JPL |
| 361451 | 2007 BD_{79} | — | January 27, 2007 | Kitt Peak | Spacewatch | · | 2.1 km | MPC · JPL |
| 361452 | 2007 BF_{102} | — | January 28, 2007 | Catalina | CSS | · | 4.0 km | MPC · JPL |
| 361453 | 2007 CE_{5} | — | December 27, 2006 | Mount Lemmon | Mount Lemmon Survey | · | 2.9 km | MPC · JPL |
| 361454 | 2007 CF_{5} | — | February 6, 2007 | Kitt Peak | Spacewatch | · | 2.8 km | MPC · JPL |
| 361455 | 2007 CQ_{18} | — | February 8, 2007 | Mount Lemmon | Mount Lemmon Survey | · | 2.8 km | MPC · JPL |
| 361456 | 2007 CN_{19} | — | February 6, 2007 | Mount Lemmon | Mount Lemmon Survey | BRA | 1.9 km | MPC · JPL |
| 361457 | 2007 CG_{27} | — | February 5, 2007 | Palomar | NEAT | · | 2.3 km | MPC · JPL |
| 361458 | 2007 CY_{27} | — | February 6, 2007 | Kitt Peak | Spacewatch | THM | 2.0 km | MPC · JPL |
| 361459 | 2007 CO_{33} | — | February 6, 2007 | Mount Lemmon | Mount Lemmon Survey | EOS | 2.0 km | MPC · JPL |
| 361460 | 2007 CP_{33} | — | February 6, 2007 | Mount Lemmon | Mount Lemmon Survey | · | 2.3 km | MPC · JPL |
| 361461 | 2007 CK_{44} | — | November 22, 2006 | Mount Lemmon | Mount Lemmon Survey | · | 4.0 km | MPC · JPL |
| 361462 | 2007 CQ_{47} | — | February 10, 2007 | Catalina | CSS | TIR | 3.9 km | MPC · JPL |
| 361463 | 2007 CC_{60} | — | February 10, 2007 | Catalina | CSS | · | 3.3 km | MPC · JPL |
| 361464 | 2007 CC_{63} | — | February 15, 2007 | Palomar | NEAT | THM | 2.9 km | MPC · JPL |
| 361465 | 2007 CZ_{71} | — | February 14, 2007 | Mauna Kea | Mauna Kea | · | 2.5 km | MPC · JPL |
| 361466 | 2007 DV_{14} | — | February 17, 2007 | Kitt Peak | Spacewatch | · | 2.9 km | MPC · JPL |
| 361467 | 2007 DJ_{26} | — | February 17, 2007 | Kitt Peak | Spacewatch | HYG | 2.4 km | MPC · JPL |
| 361468 | 2007 DO_{28} | — | February 17, 2007 | Kitt Peak | Spacewatch | VER | 2.6 km | MPC · JPL |
| 361469 | 2007 DD_{29} | — | February 17, 2007 | Kitt Peak | Spacewatch | THM | 2.4 km | MPC · JPL |
| 361470 | 2007 DF_{31} | — | November 21, 2006 | Mount Lemmon | Mount Lemmon Survey | · | 4.6 km | MPC · JPL |
| 361471 | 2007 DK_{39} | — | February 17, 2007 | Kitt Peak | Spacewatch | · | 3.6 km | MPC · JPL |
| 361472 | 2007 DM_{43} | — | November 1, 2006 | Mount Lemmon | Mount Lemmon Survey | · | 4.4 km | MPC · JPL |
| 361473 | 2007 DD_{44} | — | February 17, 2007 | Mount Lemmon | Mount Lemmon Survey | · | 2.7 km | MPC · JPL |
| 361474 | 2007 DZ_{48} | — | February 21, 2007 | Mount Lemmon | Mount Lemmon Survey | · | 4.7 km | MPC · JPL |
| 361475 | 2007 DW_{49} | — | April 21, 2002 | Palomar | NEAT | · | 4.4 km | MPC · JPL |
| 361476 | 2007 DR_{52} | — | February 19, 2007 | Mount Lemmon | Mount Lemmon Survey | EOS | 2.2 km | MPC · JPL |
| 361477 | 2007 DB_{55} | — | February 21, 2007 | Socorro | LINEAR | · | 3.5 km | MPC · JPL |
| 361478 | 2007 DF_{70} | — | February 21, 2007 | Kitt Peak | Spacewatch | · | 2.7 km | MPC · JPL |
| 361479 | 2007 DO_{79} | — | January 28, 2007 | Catalina | CSS | T_{j} (2.99) | 3.6 km | MPC · JPL |
| 361480 | 2007 DY_{82} | — | February 23, 2007 | Mount Lemmon | Mount Lemmon Survey | T_{j} (2.98) | 3.9 km | MPC · JPL |
| 361481 | 2007 DW_{85} | — | February 21, 2007 | Mount Lemmon | Mount Lemmon Survey | HYG | 2.8 km | MPC · JPL |
| 361482 | 2007 DP_{86} | — | February 23, 2007 | Mount Lemmon | Mount Lemmon Survey | · | 2.8 km | MPC · JPL |
| 361483 | 2007 DG_{87} | — | February 23, 2007 | Kitt Peak | Spacewatch | · | 3.1 km | MPC · JPL |
| 361484 | 2007 DR_{92} | — | February 23, 2007 | Kitt Peak | Spacewatch | · | 3.2 km | MPC · JPL |
| 361485 | 2007 DH_{98} | — | February 25, 2007 | Mount Lemmon | Mount Lemmon Survey | · | 3.3 km | MPC · JPL |
| 361486 | 2007 DO_{99} | — | February 25, 2007 | Mount Lemmon | Mount Lemmon Survey | · | 5.1 km | MPC · JPL |
| 361487 | 2007 DG_{103} | — | February 21, 2007 | Kitt Peak | M. W. Buie | · | 4.1 km | MPC · JPL |
| 361488 | 2007 DH_{110} | — | February 17, 2007 | Mount Lemmon | Mount Lemmon Survey | · | 3.6 km | MPC · JPL |
| 361489 | 2007 DK_{112} | — | February 25, 2007 | Mount Lemmon | Mount Lemmon Survey | · | 3.3 km | MPC · JPL |
| 361490 | 2007 DT_{116} | — | February 17, 2007 | Catalina | CSS | · | 2.8 km | MPC · JPL |
| 361491 | 2007 DP_{117} | — | February 27, 2007 | Kitt Peak | Spacewatch | VER | 3.3 km | MPC · JPL |
| 361492 | 2007 EA_{12} | — | February 26, 2007 | Mount Lemmon | Mount Lemmon Survey | · | 4.5 km | MPC · JPL |
| 361493 | 2007 ET_{12} | — | March 9, 2007 | Catalina | CSS | · | 4.2 km | MPC · JPL |
| 361494 | 2007 EU_{18} | — | August 14, 2004 | Cerro Tololo | Deep Ecliptic Survey | · | 3.4 km | MPC · JPL |
| 361495 | 2007 EN_{28} | — | March 9, 2007 | Palomar | NEAT | · | 3.6 km | MPC · JPL |
| 361496 | 2007 EH_{31} | — | March 10, 2007 | Kitt Peak | Spacewatch | · | 2.4 km | MPC · JPL |
| 361497 | 2007 EM_{31} | — | March 10, 2007 | Kitt Peak | Spacewatch | · | 2.9 km | MPC · JPL |
| 361498 | 2007 EZ_{37} | — | March 11, 2007 | Mount Lemmon | Mount Lemmon Survey | · | 3.7 km | MPC · JPL |
| 361499 | 2007 EH_{60} | — | March 10, 2007 | Palomar | NEAT | · | 4.1 km | MPC · JPL |
| 361500 | 2007 ER_{75} | — | March 10, 2007 | Kitt Peak | Spacewatch | · | 3.9 km | MPC · JPL |

== 361501–361600 ==
back to top

| Designation | | | Discovery | | | Properties | | Ref |
| Permanent | Provisional | Named after | Date | Site | Discoverer(s) | Category | Diam. | Ref |
|---|---|---|---|---|---|---|---|---|
| 361501 | 2007 EF_{78} | — | March 10, 2007 | Mount Lemmon | Mount Lemmon Survey | · | 3.3 km | MPC · JPL |
| 361502 | 2007 ES_{91} | — | October 25, 2005 | Kitt Peak | Spacewatch | THM | 2.3 km | MPC · JPL |
| 361503 | 2007 EO_{104} | — | March 11, 2007 | Mount Lemmon | Mount Lemmon Survey | ELF | 3.7 km | MPC · JPL |
| 361504 | 2007 EK_{110} | — | March 11, 2007 | Kitt Peak | Spacewatch | · | 4.0 km | MPC · JPL |
| 361505 | 2007 EO_{114} | — | March 13, 2007 | Catalina | CSS | · | 3.4 km | MPC · JPL |
| 361506 | 2007 EK_{126} | — | March 9, 2007 | Kitt Peak | Spacewatch | · | 5.0 km | MPC · JPL |
| 361507 | 2007 EB_{136} | — | March 10, 2007 | Mount Lemmon | Mount Lemmon Survey | URS | 3.5 km | MPC · JPL |
| 361508 | 2007 EX_{136} | — | March 10, 2007 | Catalina | CSS | T_{j} (2.98) | 6.4 km | MPC · JPL |
| 361509 | 2007 EP_{145} | — | February 26, 2007 | Mount Lemmon | Mount Lemmon Survey | · | 3.3 km | MPC · JPL |
| 361510 | 2007 ET_{157} | — | December 24, 2006 | Mount Lemmon | Mount Lemmon Survey | · | 2.4 km | MPC · JPL |
| 361511 | 2007 EZ_{181} | — | March 14, 2007 | Kitt Peak | Spacewatch | · | 4.1 km | MPC · JPL |
| 361512 | 2007 EE_{200} | — | March 11, 2007 | Kitt Peak | Spacewatch | TIR | 3.5 km | MPC · JPL |
| 361513 | 2007 ER_{202} | — | March 9, 2007 | Catalina | CSS | · | 3.7 km | MPC · JPL |
| 361514 | 2007 EA_{212} | — | November 28, 2006 | Kitt Peak | Spacewatch | · | 4.1 km | MPC · JPL |
| 361515 | 2007 EJ_{216} | — | March 13, 2007 | Catalina | CSS | LIX | 4.5 km | MPC · JPL |
| 361516 | 2007 EO_{220} | — | March 15, 2007 | Kitt Peak | Spacewatch | · | 3.1 km | MPC · JPL |
| 361517 | 2007 EZ_{220} | — | March 13, 2007 | Kitt Peak | Spacewatch | · | 3.7 km | MPC · JPL |
| 361518 | 2007 FD | — | March 16, 2007 | Kitt Peak | Spacewatch | APO +1km | 1.3 km | MPC · JPL |
| 361519 | 2007 FO_{1} | — | January 17, 2007 | Palomar | NEAT | · | 5.1 km | MPC · JPL |
| 361520 | 2007 FE_{12} | — | March 17, 2007 | Anderson Mesa | LONEOS | · | 4.9 km | MPC · JPL |
| 361521 | 2007 FG_{20} | — | March 25, 2007 | Pla D'Arguines | R. Ferrando | LIX | 4.4 km | MPC · JPL |
| 361522 | 2007 FR_{24} | — | March 20, 2007 | Mount Lemmon | Mount Lemmon Survey | · | 3.1 km | MPC · JPL |
| 361523 | 2007 FN_{34} | — | March 25, 2007 | Altschwendt | W. Ries | · | 3.2 km | MPC · JPL |
| 361524 Klimka | 2007 FN_{35} | Klimka | March 24, 2007 | Moletai | K. Černis, Zdanavicius, J. | · | 3.6 km | MPC · JPL |
| 361525 | 2007 FO_{42} | — | March 17, 2007 | Catalina | CSS | EUP | 3.3 km | MPC · JPL |
| 361526 | 2007 FG_{46} | — | March 26, 2007 | Kitt Peak | Spacewatch | THM | 2.4 km | MPC · JPL |
| 361527 | 2007 GL_{30} | — | April 14, 2007 | Mount Lemmon | Mount Lemmon Survey | · | 4.1 km | MPC · JPL |
| 361528 | 2007 GK_{35} | — | April 14, 2007 | Kitt Peak | Spacewatch | · | 3.8 km | MPC · JPL |
| 361529 | 2007 GT_{51} | — | April 15, 2007 | Kitt Peak | Spacewatch | · | 4.2 km | MPC · JPL |
| 361530 Victorfranzhess | 2007 HN_{16} | Victorfranzhess | April 22, 2007 | Gaisberg | Gierlinger, R. | · | 2.8 km | MPC · JPL |
| 361531 | 2007 HQ_{16} | — | February 17, 2007 | Mount Lemmon | Mount Lemmon Survey | LIX | 3.3 km | MPC · JPL |
| 361532 | 2007 HF_{44} | — | April 22, 2007 | Mount Lemmon | Mount Lemmon Survey | AMO | 500 m | MPC · JPL |
| 361533 | 2007 HM_{68} | — | April 15, 2007 | Catalina | CSS | EOS | 3.2 km | MPC · JPL |
| 361534 | 2007 HD_{88} | — | April 19, 2007 | Mount Lemmon | Mount Lemmon Survey | · | 4.0 km | MPC · JPL |
| 361535 | 2007 HY_{94} | — | April 16, 2007 | Catalina | CSS | · | 3.7 km | MPC · JPL |
| 361536 | 2007 JE_{7} | — | May 9, 2007 | Mount Lemmon | Mount Lemmon Survey | CYB | 4.3 km | MPC · JPL |
| 361537 | 2007 JH_{16} | — | May 11, 2007 | Catalina | CSS | · | 700 m | MPC · JPL |
| 361538 | 2007 JZ_{20} | — | May 11, 2007 | Socorro | LINEAR | APO | 480 m | MPC · JPL |
| 361539 | 2007 KN_{3} | — | May 23, 2007 | Mount Lemmon | Mount Lemmon Survey | · | 780 m | MPC · JPL |
| 361540 | 2007 PP_{7} | — | August 9, 2007 | Bisei SG Center | BATTeRS | · | 3.1 km | MPC · JPL |
| 361541 | 2007 PF_{9} | — | September 24, 2000 | Socorro | LINEAR | V | 870 m | MPC · JPL |
| 361542 | 2007 PL_{24} | — | August 12, 2007 | Socorro | LINEAR | · | 880 m | MPC · JPL |
| 361543 | 2007 PQ_{24} | — | August 12, 2007 | Socorro | LINEAR | · | 820 m | MPC · JPL |
| 361544 | 2007 PA_{27} | — | August 7, 2007 | Palomar | Palomar | · | 700 m | MPC · JPL |
| 361545 | 2007 PS_{27} | — | August 8, 2007 | Siding Spring | SSS | · | 900 m | MPC · JPL |
| 361546 | 2007 PP_{35} | — | August 10, 2007 | Kitt Peak | Spacewatch | · | 760 m | MPC · JPL |
| 361547 | 2007 PM_{37} | — | August 13, 2007 | Socorro | LINEAR | V | 800 m | MPC · JPL |
| 361548 | 2007 PS_{42} | — | August 15, 2007 | Socorro | LINEAR | · | 740 m | MPC · JPL |
| 361549 | 2007 PL_{50} | — | August 8, 2007 | Socorro | LINEAR | V | 650 m | MPC · JPL |
| 361550 | 2007 QF_{6} | — | August 21, 2007 | Anderson Mesa | LONEOS | · | 1 km | MPC · JPL |
| 361551 | 2007 QN_{7} | — | August 21, 2007 | Anderson Mesa | LONEOS | · | 780 m | MPC · JPL |
| 361552 | 2007 QJ_{8} | — | August 21, 2007 | Anderson Mesa | LONEOS | · | 1.4 km | MPC · JPL |
| 361553 | 2007 QM_{10} | — | August 23, 2007 | Kitt Peak | Spacewatch | · | 810 m | MPC · JPL |
| 361554 | 2007 QT_{13} | — | August 21, 2007 | Anderson Mesa | LONEOS | · | 1.0 km | MPC · JPL |
| 361555 | 2007 QP_{16} | — | August 21, 2007 | Anderson Mesa | LONEOS | · | 920 m | MPC · JPL |
| 361556 | 2007 RJ | — | September 1, 2007 | Dauban | Chante-Perdrix | · | 760 m | MPC · JPL |
| 361557 | 2007 RS_{2} | — | September 2, 2007 | Mount Lemmon | Mount Lemmon Survey | · | 1.6 km | MPC · JPL |
| 361558 | 2007 RM_{4} | — | September 3, 2007 | Catalina | CSS | · | 840 m | MPC · JPL |
| 361559 | 2007 RD_{10} | — | September 2, 2007 | Mount Lemmon | Mount Lemmon Survey | · | 2.1 km | MPC · JPL |
| 361560 | 2007 RX_{14} | — | September 11, 2007 | Dauban | Chante-Perdrix | · | 730 m | MPC · JPL |
| 361561 | 2007 RH_{37} | — | September 8, 2007 | Anderson Mesa | LONEOS | · | 1.4 km | MPC · JPL |
| 361562 | 2007 RN_{41} | — | September 9, 2007 | Anderson Mesa | LONEOS | · | 860 m | MPC · JPL |
| 361563 | 2007 RZ_{50} | — | September 9, 2007 | Kitt Peak | Spacewatch | V | 760 m | MPC · JPL |
| 361564 | 2007 RP_{53} | — | September 9, 2007 | Kitt Peak | Spacewatch | · | 1.1 km | MPC · JPL |
| 361565 | 2007 RB_{55} | — | September 9, 2007 | Kitt Peak | Spacewatch | · | 1.6 km | MPC · JPL |
| 361566 | 2007 RH_{84} | — | September 10, 2007 | Kitt Peak | Spacewatch | · | 730 m | MPC · JPL |
| 361567 | 2007 RF_{92} | — | September 10, 2007 | Mount Lemmon | Mount Lemmon Survey | V | 640 m | MPC · JPL |
| 361568 | 2007 RL_{93} | — | September 10, 2007 | Kitt Peak | Spacewatch | (1338) (FLO) | 750 m | MPC · JPL |
| 361569 | 2007 RJ_{97} | — | February 2, 2000 | Socorro | LINEAR | · | 1.1 km | MPC · JPL |
| 361570 | 2007 RM_{98} | — | September 10, 2007 | Kitt Peak | Spacewatch | · | 970 m | MPC · JPL |
| 361571 | 2007 RP_{98} | — | September 10, 2007 | Kitt Peak | Spacewatch | · | 1.4 km | MPC · JPL |
| 361572 | 2007 RG_{128} | — | September 12, 2007 | Mount Lemmon | Mount Lemmon Survey | MAS | 700 m | MPC · JPL |
| 361573 | 2007 RB_{137} | — | September 14, 2007 | Mount Lemmon | Mount Lemmon Survey | MAS | 810 m | MPC · JPL |
| 361574 | 2007 RO_{142} | — | September 13, 2007 | Socorro | LINEAR | · | 1.3 km | MPC · JPL |
| 361575 | 2007 RO_{143} | — | September 14, 2007 | Socorro | LINEAR | · | 970 m | MPC · JPL |
| 361576 | 2007 RQ_{148} | — | September 12, 2007 | Catalina | CSS | · | 1.4 km | MPC · JPL |
| 361577 | 2007 RF_{166} | — | August 24, 2007 | Kitt Peak | Spacewatch | · | 1.3 km | MPC · JPL |
| 361578 | 2007 RS_{174} | — | April 2, 2006 | Kitt Peak | Spacewatch | V | 720 m | MPC · JPL |
| 361579 | 2007 RY_{174} | — | September 10, 2007 | Kitt Peak | Spacewatch | · | 1.4 km | MPC · JPL |
| 361580 | 2007 RW_{184} | — | September 13, 2007 | Catalina | CSS | V | 750 m | MPC · JPL |
| 361581 | 2007 RE_{208} | — | September 10, 2007 | Kitt Peak | Spacewatch | NYS | 1.3 km | MPC · JPL |
| 361582 | 2007 RS_{208} | — | September 10, 2007 | Kitt Peak | Spacewatch | · | 1.3 km | MPC · JPL |
| 361583 | 2007 RF_{228} | — | September 10, 2007 | Mount Lemmon | Mount Lemmon Survey | · | 1.3 km | MPC · JPL |
| 361584 | 2007 RA_{233} | — | September 12, 2007 | Catalina | CSS | V | 940 m | MPC · JPL |
| 361585 | 2007 RT_{238} | — | September 14, 2007 | Catalina | CSS | · | 950 m | MPC · JPL |
| 361586 | 2007 RB_{240} | — | September 14, 2007 | Catalina | CSS | · | 850 m | MPC · JPL |
| 361587 | 2007 RS_{240} | — | September 10, 2007 | Catalina | CSS | V | 780 m | MPC · JPL |
| 361588 | 2007 RU_{242} | — | September 15, 2007 | Socorro | LINEAR | · | 740 m | MPC · JPL |
| 361589 | 2007 RB_{244} | — | September 15, 2007 | Socorro | LINEAR | · | 1.4 km | MPC · JPL |
| 361590 | 2007 RJ_{245} | — | September 11, 2007 | Kitt Peak | Spacewatch | · | 930 m | MPC · JPL |
| 361591 | 2007 RX_{247} | — | September 13, 2007 | Catalina | CSS | V | 730 m | MPC · JPL |
| 361592 | 2007 RO_{260} | — | September 14, 2007 | Mount Lemmon | Mount Lemmon Survey | · | 750 m | MPC · JPL |
| 361593 | 2007 RE_{277} | — | September 5, 2007 | Catalina | CSS | · | 940 m | MPC · JPL |
| 361594 | 2007 RM_{288} | — | September 12, 2007 | Mount Lemmon | Mount Lemmon Survey | · | 1.1 km | MPC · JPL |
| 361595 | 2007 RR_{289} | — | September 12, 2007 | Mount Lemmon | Mount Lemmon Survey | · | 770 m | MPC · JPL |
| 361596 | 2007 RY_{290} | — | September 10, 2007 | Mount Lemmon | Mount Lemmon Survey | · | 1.0 km | MPC · JPL |
| 361597 | 2007 RH_{293} | — | September 13, 2007 | Mount Lemmon | Mount Lemmon Survey | · | 990 m | MPC · JPL |
| 361598 | 2007 RH_{295} | — | September 14, 2007 | Mount Lemmon | Mount Lemmon Survey | · | 800 m | MPC · JPL |
| 361599 | 2007 RQ_{311} | — | September 2, 2007 | Catalina | CSS | V | 830 m | MPC · JPL |
| 361600 | 2007 RU_{316} | — | September 9, 2007 | Kitt Peak | Spacewatch | · | 770 m | MPC · JPL |

== 361601–361700 ==
back to top

| Designation | | | Discovery | | | Properties | | Ref |
| Permanent | Provisional | Named after | Date | Site | Discoverer(s) | Category | Diam. | Ref |
|---|---|---|---|---|---|---|---|---|
| 361601 | 2007 RY_{323} | — | September 12, 2007 | Mount Lemmon | Mount Lemmon Survey | MAS | 810 m | MPC · JPL |
| 361602 | 2007 RX_{324} | — | September 13, 2007 | Kitt Peak | Spacewatch | · | 1.1 km | MPC · JPL |
| 361603 | 2007 RJ_{325} | — | September 14, 2007 | Mount Lemmon | Mount Lemmon Survey | (5) | 1.4 km | MPC · JPL |
| 361604 | 2007 SK_{4} | — | September 20, 2007 | Catalina | CSS | · | 2.3 km | MPC · JPL |
| 361605 | 2007 SU_{17} | — | September 30, 2007 | Kitt Peak | Spacewatch | · | 650 m | MPC · JPL |
| 361606 | 2007 SS_{23} | — | September 26, 2007 | Mount Lemmon | Mount Lemmon Survey | PHO | 980 m | MPC · JPL |
| 361607 | 2007 SY_{23} | — | September 24, 2007 | Socorro | LINEAR | BAR | 1.4 km | MPC · JPL |
| 361608 | 2007 TK_{3} | — | October 3, 2007 | Calvin-Rehoboth | L. A. Molnar | SUL | 2.2 km | MPC · JPL |
| 361609 | 2007 TS_{7} | — | October 7, 2007 | Dauban | Chante-Perdrix | · | 2.0 km | MPC · JPL |
| 361610 | 2007 TH_{18} | — | September 20, 2007 | Kitt Peak | Spacewatch | NYS | 1.3 km | MPC · JPL |
| 361611 | 2007 TY_{18} | — | October 9, 2007 | Kitt Peak | Spacewatch | AMO | 770 m | MPC · JPL |
| 361612 | 2007 TO_{30} | — | October 4, 2007 | Kitt Peak | Spacewatch | MAS | 840 m | MPC · JPL |
| 361613 | 2007 TZ_{44} | — | September 13, 2007 | Mount Lemmon | Mount Lemmon Survey | · | 1.6 km | MPC · JPL |
| 361614 | 2007 TO_{47} | — | October 4, 2007 | Kitt Peak | Spacewatch | · | 840 m | MPC · JPL |
| 361615 | 2007 TT_{55} | — | October 4, 2007 | Kitt Peak | Spacewatch | V | 850 m | MPC · JPL |
| 361616 | 2007 TS_{64} | — | October 7, 2007 | Mount Lemmon | Mount Lemmon Survey | MAS | 840 m | MPC · JPL |
| 361617 | 2007 TD_{75} | — | October 3, 2007 | Purple Mountain | PMO NEO Survey Program | · | 1.7 km | MPC · JPL |
| 361618 | 2007 TG_{76} | — | October 5, 2007 | Kitt Peak | Spacewatch | · | 930 m | MPC · JPL |
| 361619 | 2007 TJ_{80} | — | October 7, 2007 | Catalina | CSS | · | 1.2 km | MPC · JPL |
| 361620 | 2007 TK_{82} | — | October 8, 2007 | Mount Lemmon | Mount Lemmon Survey | CLA | 1.5 km | MPC · JPL |
| 361621 | 2007 TZ_{86} | — | October 8, 2007 | Mount Lemmon | Mount Lemmon Survey | V | 780 m | MPC · JPL |
| 361622 | 2007 TB_{92} | — | October 4, 2007 | Purple Mountain | PMO NEO Survey Program | · | 1.9 km | MPC · JPL |
| 361623 | 2007 TD_{114} | — | October 8, 2007 | Catalina | CSS | · | 1.3 km | MPC · JPL |
| 361624 | 2007 TN_{114} | — | October 8, 2007 | Catalina | CSS | · | 1.4 km | MPC · JPL |
| 361625 | 2007 TP_{142} | — | October 13, 2007 | Dauban | Chante-Perdrix | · | 1.8 km | MPC · JPL |
| 361626 | 2007 TP_{145} | — | October 6, 2007 | Socorro | LINEAR | · | 1.5 km | MPC · JPL |
| 361627 | 2007 TG_{148} | — | October 7, 2007 | Socorro | LINEAR | · | 1.7 km | MPC · JPL |
| 361628 | 2007 TO_{157} | — | October 9, 2007 | Socorro | LINEAR | · | 2.0 km | MPC · JPL |
| 361629 | 2007 TD_{164} | — | October 11, 2007 | Socorro | LINEAR | · | 1.4 km | MPC · JPL |
| 361630 | 2007 TF_{175} | — | October 4, 2007 | Kitt Peak | Spacewatch | · | 1.3 km | MPC · JPL |
| 361631 | 2007 TL_{176} | — | October 5, 2007 | Kitt Peak | Spacewatch | · | 1.1 km | MPC · JPL |
| 361632 | 2007 TE_{181} | — | October 8, 2007 | Anderson Mesa | LONEOS | V | 770 m | MPC · JPL |
| 361633 | 2007 TP_{182} | — | October 8, 2007 | Anderson Mesa | LONEOS | · | 1.7 km | MPC · JPL |
| 361634 | 2007 TY_{185} | — | October 13, 2007 | Socorro | LINEAR | · | 1.5 km | MPC · JPL |
| 361635 | 2007 TF_{200} | — | October 8, 2007 | Kitt Peak | Spacewatch | · | 1.1 km | MPC · JPL |
| 361636 | 2007 TP_{212} | — | October 7, 2007 | Kitt Peak | Spacewatch | · | 1.3 km | MPC · JPL |
| 361637 | 2007 TP_{217} | — | October 7, 2007 | Kitt Peak | Spacewatch | · | 1.3 km | MPC · JPL |
| 361638 | 2007 TX_{218} | — | September 10, 2007 | Mount Lemmon | Mount Lemmon Survey | · | 1.2 km | MPC · JPL |
| 361639 | 2007 TO_{243} | — | October 8, 2007 | Catalina | CSS | PHO | 1.8 km | MPC · JPL |
| 361640 | 2007 TH_{244} | — | October 8, 2007 | Catalina | CSS | · | 1.5 km | MPC · JPL |
| 361641 | 2007 TR_{251} | — | October 11, 2007 | Mount Lemmon | Mount Lemmon Survey | · | 970 m | MPC · JPL |
| 361642 | 2007 TE_{256} | — | October 10, 2007 | Kitt Peak | Spacewatch | · | 790 m | MPC · JPL |
| 361643 | 2007 TB_{260} | — | October 10, 2007 | Mount Lemmon | Mount Lemmon Survey | · | 1.0 km | MPC · JPL |
| 361644 | 2007 TH_{299} | — | October 12, 2007 | Kitt Peak | Spacewatch | · | 760 m | MPC · JPL |
| 361645 | 2007 TE_{301} | — | October 12, 2007 | Kitt Peak | Spacewatch | · | 1.6 km | MPC · JPL |
| 361646 | 2007 TU_{303} | — | October 12, 2007 | Anderson Mesa | LONEOS | · | 2.0 km | MPC · JPL |
| 361647 | 2007 TJ_{316} | — | October 12, 2007 | Kitt Peak | Spacewatch | (5) | 1.1 km | MPC · JPL |
| 361648 | 2007 TZ_{317} | — | October 12, 2007 | Kitt Peak | Spacewatch | (5) | 890 m | MPC · JPL |
| 361649 | 2007 TO_{318} | — | September 14, 2007 | Mount Lemmon | Mount Lemmon Survey | (5) | 1.1 km | MPC · JPL |
| 361650 | 2007 TR_{320} | — | October 13, 2007 | Catalina | CSS | · | 820 m | MPC · JPL |
| 361651 | 2007 TO_{326} | — | October 11, 2007 | Kitt Peak | Spacewatch | (5) | 1.2 km | MPC · JPL |
| 361652 | 2007 TS_{328} | — | October 11, 2007 | Kitt Peak | Spacewatch | · | 1.2 km | MPC · JPL |
| 361653 | 2007 TX_{330} | — | October 11, 2007 | Kitt Peak | Spacewatch | fast | 1.2 km | MPC · JPL |
| 361654 | 2007 TK_{338} | — | October 13, 2007 | Lulin | LUSS | · | 980 m | MPC · JPL |
| 361655 | 2007 TL_{338} | — | October 13, 2007 | Lulin | LUSS | V | 710 m | MPC · JPL |
| 361656 | 2007 TG_{353} | — | October 8, 2007 | Mount Lemmon | Mount Lemmon Survey | · | 1.1 km | MPC · JPL |
| 361657 | 2007 TP_{356} | — | October 12, 2007 | Catalina | CSS | · | 860 m | MPC · JPL |
| 361658 | 2007 TE_{357} | — | October 12, 2007 | Kitt Peak | Spacewatch | V | 850 m | MPC · JPL |
| 361659 | 2007 TS_{380} | — | October 14, 2007 | Kitt Peak | Spacewatch | (5) | 1.2 km | MPC · JPL |
| 361660 | 2007 TB_{383} | — | September 15, 2007 | Mount Lemmon | Mount Lemmon Survey | (5) | 1.1 km | MPC · JPL |
| 361661 | 2007 TH_{386} | — | October 15, 2007 | Catalina | CSS | · | 1.2 km | MPC · JPL |
| 361662 | 2007 TB_{391} | — | October 14, 2007 | Catalina | CSS | V | 950 m | MPC · JPL |
| 361663 | 2007 TS_{407} | — | October 15, 2007 | Kitt Peak | Spacewatch | · | 1.4 km | MPC · JPL |
| 361664 | 2007 TS_{409} | — | October 15, 2007 | Mount Lemmon | Mount Lemmon Survey | · | 1.5 km | MPC · JPL |
| 361665 | 2007 TH_{410} | — | October 13, 2007 | Catalina | CSS | · | 1.3 km | MPC · JPL |
| 361666 | 2007 TF_{419} | — | October 10, 2007 | Kitt Peak | Spacewatch | · | 1.4 km | MPC · JPL |
| 361667 | 2007 TX_{422} | — | October 12, 2007 | Kitt Peak | Spacewatch | · | 990 m | MPC · JPL |
| 361668 | 2007 TQ_{424} | — | October 8, 2007 | Kitt Peak | Spacewatch | · | 1.2 km | MPC · JPL |
| 361669 | 2007 TN_{430} | — | October 12, 2007 | Mount Lemmon | Mount Lemmon Survey | · | 1.3 km | MPC · JPL |
| 361670 | 2007 TR_{450} | — | October 12, 2007 | Mount Lemmon | Mount Lemmon Survey | V | 910 m | MPC · JPL |
| 361671 | 2007 TU_{450} | — | October 13, 2007 | Socorro | LINEAR | · | 1.0 km | MPC · JPL |
| 361672 | 2007 TW_{451} | — | October 11, 2007 | Socorro | LINEAR | PHO | 1.5 km | MPC · JPL |
| 361673 | 2007 UU_{1} | — | October 17, 2007 | Junk Bond | D. Healy | · | 930 m | MPC · JPL |
| 361674 | 2007 UB_{5} | — | October 16, 2007 | Andrushivka | Andrushivka | · | 1.5 km | MPC · JPL |
| 361675 | 2007 UA_{6} | — | October 21, 2007 | La Sagra | OAM | · | 2.1 km | MPC · JPL |
| 361676 | 2007 UH_{31} | — | October 19, 2007 | Catalina | CSS | · | 1.2 km | MPC · JPL |
| 361677 | 2007 UJ_{31} | — | October 19, 2007 | Catalina | CSS | · | 840 m | MPC · JPL |
| 361678 | 2007 UP_{33} | — | October 9, 2007 | Catalina | CSS | BAR | 1.7 km | MPC · JPL |
| 361679 | 2007 UC_{38} | — | October 19, 2007 | Kitt Peak | Spacewatch | · | 1.2 km | MPC · JPL |
| 361680 | 2007 UG_{38} | — | October 19, 2007 | Kitt Peak | Spacewatch | · | 1.1 km | MPC · JPL |
| 361681 | 2007 UO_{46} | — | October 20, 2007 | Catalina | CSS | · | 1.3 km | MPC · JPL |
| 361682 | 2007 UY_{50} | — | October 24, 2007 | Mount Lemmon | Mount Lemmon Survey | · | 1.8 km | MPC · JPL |
| 361683 | 2007 UO_{91} | — | October 30, 2007 | Mount Lemmon | Mount Lemmon Survey | · | 1.3 km | MPC · JPL |
| 361684 | 2007 UJ_{114} | — | October 7, 2007 | Kitt Peak | Spacewatch | · | 1.4 km | MPC · JPL |
| 361685 | 2007 UL_{114} | — | October 31, 2007 | Kitt Peak | Spacewatch | · | 1.7 km | MPC · JPL |
| 361686 | 2007 UP_{114} | — | October 31, 2007 | Kitt Peak | Spacewatch | · | 1.3 km | MPC · JPL |
| 361687 | 2007 UX_{128} | — | October 24, 2007 | Mount Lemmon | Mount Lemmon Survey | V | 710 m | MPC · JPL |
| 361688 | 2007 UN_{129} | — | October 24, 2007 | Mount Lemmon | Mount Lemmon Survey | · | 1.5 km | MPC · JPL |
| 361689 | 2007 VY_{7} | — | November 4, 2007 | Catalina | CSS | APO | 460 m | MPC · JPL |
| 361690 Laurelanmaurer | 2007 VN_{8} | Laurelanmaurer | November 5, 2007 | Tooele | P. Wiggins | NYS | 1.2 km | MPC · JPL |
| 361691 | 2007 VZ_{45} | — | November 1, 2007 | Kitt Peak | Spacewatch | · | 1.3 km | MPC · JPL |
| 361692 | 2007 VU_{51} | — | November 1, 2007 | Kitt Peak | Spacewatch | · | 1.3 km | MPC · JPL |
| 361693 | 2007 VO_{101} | — | November 2, 2007 | Kitt Peak | Spacewatch | · | 1.1 km | MPC · JPL |
| 361694 | 2007 VL_{102} | — | November 2, 2007 | Kitt Peak | Spacewatch | · | 2.7 km | MPC · JPL |
| 361695 | 2007 VE_{108} | — | November 3, 2007 | Kitt Peak | Spacewatch | · | 1.3 km | MPC · JPL |
| 361696 | 2007 VM_{125} | — | November 5, 2007 | Purple Mountain | PMO NEO Survey Program | · | 1.3 km | MPC · JPL |
| 361697 | 2007 VS_{153} | — | November 4, 2007 | Kitt Peak | Spacewatch | · | 910 m | MPC · JPL |
| 361698 | 2007 VT_{155} | — | November 5, 2007 | Kitt Peak | Spacewatch | · | 1.3 km | MPC · JPL |
| 361699 | 2007 VD_{162} | — | November 5, 2007 | Kitt Peak | Spacewatch | · | 1.5 km | MPC · JPL |
| 361700 | 2007 VA_{165} | — | November 5, 2007 | Kitt Peak | Spacewatch | · | 1.6 km | MPC · JPL |

== 361701–361800 ==
back to top

| Designation | | | Discovery | | | Properties | | Ref |
| Permanent | Provisional | Named after | Date | Site | Discoverer(s) | Category | Diam. | Ref |
|---|---|---|---|---|---|---|---|---|
| 361701 | 2007 VZ_{171} | — | November 24, 2003 | Kitt Peak | Deep Ecliptic Survey | · | 1.3 km | MPC · JPL |
| 361702 | 2007 VN_{195} | — | November 7, 2007 | Mount Lemmon | Mount Lemmon Survey | · | 1.6 km | MPC · JPL |
| 361703 | 2007 VO_{202} | — | November 7, 2007 | Mount Lemmon | Mount Lemmon Survey | · | 770 m | MPC · JPL |
| 361704 | 2007 VZ_{206} | — | November 9, 2007 | Catalina | CSS | V | 960 m | MPC · JPL |
| 361705 | 2007 VC_{245} | — | November 14, 2007 | Bisei SG Center | BATTeRS | (5) | 1.4 km | MPC · JPL |
| 361706 | 2007 VY_{250} | — | November 9, 2007 | Catalina | CSS | · | 1.6 km | MPC · JPL |
| 361707 Pharmauni | 2007 VU_{251} | Pharmauni | November 10, 2007 | Purple Mountain | PMO NEO Survey Program | · | 1.8 km | MPC · JPL |
| 361708 | 2007 VG_{258} | — | November 15, 2007 | Mount Lemmon | Mount Lemmon Survey | · | 1.4 km | MPC · JPL |
| 361709 | 2007 VP_{267} | — | September 15, 2007 | Mount Lemmon | Mount Lemmon Survey | · | 1.2 km | MPC · JPL |
| 361710 | 2007 VB_{290} | — | November 14, 2007 | Kitt Peak | Spacewatch | (5) | 1.3 km | MPC · JPL |
| 361711 | 2007 VA_{295} | — | November 15, 2007 | Anderson Mesa | LONEOS | · | 1.5 km | MPC · JPL |
| 361712 Liuhui | 2007 VX_{295} | Liuhui | November 5, 2007 | XuYi | PMO NEO Survey Program | JUN | 990 m | MPC · JPL |
| 361713 | 2007 VL_{303} | — | September 12, 2007 | Catalina | CSS | · | 1.8 km | MPC · JPL |
| 361714 | 2007 VL_{307} | — | November 3, 2007 | Kitt Peak | Spacewatch | · | 1.5 km | MPC · JPL |
| 361715 | 2007 VO_{313} | — | November 9, 2007 | Kitt Peak | Spacewatch | NYS | 1.5 km | MPC · JPL |
| 361716 | 2007 VM_{321} | — | December 18, 2003 | Socorro | LINEAR | EUN | 1.5 km | MPC · JPL |
| 361717 | 2007 VX_{322} | — | November 2, 2007 | Socorro | LINEAR | · | 1.6 km | MPC · JPL |
| 361718 | 2007 VA_{324} | — | November 5, 2007 | Socorro | LINEAR | MAS | 760 m | MPC · JPL |
| 361719 | 2007 VJ_{329} | — | November 14, 2007 | Kitt Peak | Spacewatch | · | 1.1 km | MPC · JPL |
| 361720 | 2007 VZ_{334} | — | November 14, 2007 | Kitt Peak | Spacewatch | · | 1.2 km | MPC · JPL |
| 361721 | 2007 WS_{9} | — | November 17, 2007 | Mount Lemmon | Mount Lemmon Survey | · | 1.5 km | MPC · JPL |
| 361722 | 2007 WF_{19} | — | November 18, 2007 | Mount Lemmon | Mount Lemmon Survey | · | 750 m | MPC · JPL |
| 361723 | 2007 WO_{27} | — | November 3, 2007 | Kitt Peak | Spacewatch | · | 1.4 km | MPC · JPL |
| 361724 | 2007 WK_{31} | — | November 19, 2007 | Kitt Peak | Spacewatch | (5) | 1.3 km | MPC · JPL |
| 361725 | 2007 WF_{33} | — | November 19, 2007 | Mount Lemmon | Mount Lemmon Survey | · | 1.2 km | MPC · JPL |
| 361726 | 2007 WS_{43} | — | November 19, 2007 | Mount Lemmon | Mount Lemmon Survey | (5) | 1.0 km | MPC · JPL |
| 361727 | 2007 WY_{49} | — | November 20, 2007 | Mount Lemmon | Mount Lemmon Survey | · | 2.2 km | MPC · JPL |
| 361728 | 2007 WT_{50} | — | November 20, 2007 | Mount Lemmon | Mount Lemmon Survey | · | 1.7 km | MPC · JPL |
| 361729 | 2007 WU_{52} | — | November 17, 2007 | Catalina | CSS | · | 1.5 km | MPC · JPL |
| 361730 | 2007 WS_{55} | — | November 29, 2007 | Lulin | LUSS | BAR | 1.4 km | MPC · JPL |
| 361731 | 2007 WN_{61} | — | November 20, 2007 | Kitt Peak | Spacewatch | (5) | 1.2 km | MPC · JPL |
| 361732 | 2007 WN_{62} | — | November 19, 2003 | Kitt Peak | Spacewatch | · | 1.2 km | MPC · JPL |
| 361733 | 2007 XF_{3} | — | October 20, 2007 | Mount Lemmon | Mount Lemmon Survey | (5) | 1.4 km | MPC · JPL |
| 361734 | 2007 XQ_{10} | — | December 5, 2007 | Pla D'Arguines | R. Ferrando | · | 1.3 km | MPC · JPL |
| 361735 | 2007 XJ_{11} | — | October 19, 2007 | Catalina | CSS | · | 1.6 km | MPC · JPL |
| 361736 | 2007 XQ_{12} | — | December 4, 2007 | Kitt Peak | Spacewatch | V | 750 m | MPC · JPL |
| 361737 | 2007 XQ_{14} | — | December 5, 2007 | Mount Lemmon | Mount Lemmon Survey | · | 1.1 km | MPC · JPL |
| 361738 | 2007 XR_{17} | — | December 10, 2007 | Socorro | LINEAR | · | 1.4 km | MPC · JPL |
| 361739 | 2007 XV_{18} | — | September 15, 2007 | Mount Lemmon | Mount Lemmon Survey | (5) | 1.3 km | MPC · JPL |
| 361740 | 2007 XH_{22} | — | December 10, 2007 | Socorro | LINEAR | · | 1.4 km | MPC · JPL |
| 361741 | 2007 XQ_{23} | — | September 15, 2007 | Mount Lemmon | Mount Lemmon Survey | (5) | 1.1 km | MPC · JPL |
| 361742 | 2007 XW_{28} | — | November 5, 2007 | Kitt Peak | Spacewatch | (5) | 1.2 km | MPC · JPL |
| 361743 | 2007 XG_{33} | — | December 9, 2007 | Nyukasa | Nyukasa | · | 1.6 km | MPC · JPL |
| 361744 | 2007 XV_{36} | — | December 13, 2007 | Socorro | LINEAR | · | 1.1 km | MPC · JPL |
| 361745 | 2007 XU_{39} | — | December 13, 2007 | Socorro | LINEAR | · | 2.4 km | MPC · JPL |
| 361746 | 2007 XD_{41} | — | December 14, 2007 | Socorro | LINEAR | · | 1.9 km | MPC · JPL |
| 361747 | 2007 XZ_{50} | — | December 6, 2007 | Catalina | CSS | · | 2.1 km | MPC · JPL |
| 361748 | 2007 XH_{52} | — | December 6, 2007 | Mount Lemmon | Mount Lemmon Survey | · | 1.1 km | MPC · JPL |
| 361749 | 2007 XW_{52} | — | December 14, 2007 | Mount Lemmon | Mount Lemmon Survey | ADE | 3.8 km | MPC · JPL |
| 361750 | 2007 XP_{55} | — | September 28, 2003 | Socorro | LINEAR | · | 1.5 km | MPC · JPL |
| 361751 | 2007 XO_{59} | — | December 3, 2007 | Kitt Peak | Spacewatch | · | 2.1 km | MPC · JPL |
| 361752 | 2007 YZ_{3} | — | December 19, 2007 | Piszkéstető | K. Sárneczky | · | 2.3 km | MPC · JPL |
| 361753 | 2007 YJ_{21} | — | December 4, 2007 | Kitt Peak | Spacewatch | · | 1.1 km | MPC · JPL |
| 361754 | 2007 YV_{29} | — | December 28, 2007 | Socorro | LINEAR | APO · PHA | 520 m | MPC · JPL |
| 361755 | 2007 YN_{54} | — | October 19, 1998 | Kitt Peak | Spacewatch | (5) | 1.4 km | MPC · JPL |
| 361756 | 2007 YZ_{55} | — | December 30, 2007 | Catalina | CSS | · | 4.4 km | MPC · JPL |
| 361757 | 2007 YZ_{60} | — | December 16, 2007 | Catalina | CSS | · | 1.9 km | MPC · JPL |
| 361758 | 2007 YC_{62} | — | December 18, 2007 | Mount Lemmon | Mount Lemmon Survey | · | 1.6 km | MPC · JPL |
| 361759 | 2007 YM_{63} | — | December 31, 2007 | Kitt Peak | Spacewatch | · | 1.7 km | MPC · JPL |
| 361760 | 2007 YF_{65} | — | December 16, 2007 | Catalina | CSS | · | 1.7 km | MPC · JPL |
| 361761 | 2007 YE_{66} | — | December 30, 2007 | Kitt Peak | Spacewatch | · | 1.5 km | MPC · JPL |
| 361762 | 2007 YR_{67} | — | December 17, 2007 | Mount Lemmon | Mount Lemmon Survey | · | 1.8 km | MPC · JPL |
| 361763 | 2007 YN_{73} | — | December 30, 2007 | Kitt Peak | Spacewatch | · | 1.5 km | MPC · JPL |
| 361764 Antonbuslov | 2008 AK_{2} | Antonbuslov | January 6, 2008 | Zelenchukskaya Stn | Zelenchukskaya Stn | H | 610 m | MPC · JPL |
| 361765 | 2008 AE_{5} | — | January 9, 2008 | Lulin | LUSS | · | 2.4 km | MPC · JPL |
| 361766 | 2008 AR_{6} | — | January 10, 2008 | Mount Lemmon | Mount Lemmon Survey | · | 1.6 km | MPC · JPL |
| 361767 | 2008 AF_{8} | — | January 10, 2008 | Kitt Peak | Spacewatch | · | 1.5 km | MPC · JPL |
| 361768 | 2008 AD_{11} | — | January 10, 2008 | Mount Lemmon | Mount Lemmon Survey | · | 1.7 km | MPC · JPL |
| 361769 | 2008 AG_{17} | — | January 10, 2008 | Kitt Peak | Spacewatch | · | 1.5 km | MPC · JPL |
| 361770 | 2008 AC_{21} | — | January 10, 2008 | Mount Lemmon | Mount Lemmon Survey | NEM | 2.7 km | MPC · JPL |
| 361771 | 2008 AV_{27} | — | December 14, 2007 | Mount Lemmon | Mount Lemmon Survey | · | 2.1 km | MPC · JPL |
| 361772 | 2008 AY_{29} | — | January 10, 2008 | Altschwendt | W. Ries | · | 1.9 km | MPC · JPL |
| 361773 | 2008 AM_{34} | — | January 10, 2008 | Kitt Peak | Spacewatch | · | 1.6 km | MPC · JPL |
| 361774 | 2008 AF_{38} | — | January 10, 2008 | Mount Lemmon | Mount Lemmon Survey | · | 1.8 km | MPC · JPL |
| 361775 | 2008 AK_{42} | — | January 10, 2008 | Mount Lemmon | Mount Lemmon Survey | PAD | 1.7 km | MPC · JPL |
| 361776 | 2008 AK_{56} | — | January 11, 2008 | Kitt Peak | Spacewatch | · | 2.2 km | MPC · JPL |
| 361777 | 2008 AT_{57} | — | January 11, 2008 | Kitt Peak | Spacewatch | · | 1.5 km | MPC · JPL |
| 361778 | 2008 AM_{68} | — | January 11, 2008 | Mount Lemmon | Mount Lemmon Survey | · | 1.9 km | MPC · JPL |
| 361779 | 2008 AA_{81} | — | December 31, 2007 | Kitt Peak | Spacewatch | · | 1.7 km | MPC · JPL |
| 361780 | 2008 AW_{84} | — | January 11, 2008 | Catalina | CSS | DOR | 2.0 km | MPC · JPL |
| 361781 | 2008 AF_{87} | — | January 12, 2008 | Mount Lemmon | Mount Lemmon Survey | · | 1.5 km | MPC · JPL |
| 361782 | 2008 AW_{88} | — | January 13, 2008 | Kitt Peak | Spacewatch | · | 1.5 km | MPC · JPL |
| 361783 | 2008 AU_{90} | — | January 13, 2008 | Kitt Peak | Spacewatch | · | 1.8 km | MPC · JPL |
| 361784 | 2008 AN_{97} | — | January 14, 2008 | Kitt Peak | Spacewatch | NEM | 2.0 km | MPC · JPL |
| 361785 | 2008 AR_{99} | — | January 14, 2008 | Kitt Peak | Spacewatch | · | 1.9 km | MPC · JPL |
| 361786 | 2008 AG_{102} | — | January 13, 2008 | Kitt Peak | Spacewatch | · | 1.7 km | MPC · JPL |
| 361787 | 2008 AZ_{112} | — | January 5, 2008 | Purple Mountain | PMO NEO Survey Program | · | 2.1 km | MPC · JPL |
| 361788 | 2008 AM_{129} | — | January 11, 2008 | Socorro | LINEAR | · | 2.6 km | MPC · JPL |
| 361789 | 2008 BV_{3} | — | January 16, 2008 | Kitt Peak | Spacewatch | · | 2.7 km | MPC · JPL |
| 361790 | 2008 BE_{5} | — | January 16, 2008 | Kitt Peak | Spacewatch | · | 1.6 km | MPC · JPL |
| 361791 | 2008 BP_{31} | — | January 30, 2008 | Mount Lemmon | Mount Lemmon Survey | · | 1.7 km | MPC · JPL |
| 361792 | 2008 BM_{38} | — | January 31, 2008 | Mount Lemmon | Mount Lemmon Survey | · | 2.8 km | MPC · JPL |
| 361793 | 2008 BR_{39} | — | January 30, 2008 | Catalina | CSS | · | 1.7 km | MPC · JPL |
| 361794 | 2008 BS_{40} | — | January 30, 2008 | Mount Lemmon | Mount Lemmon Survey | · | 2.4 km | MPC · JPL |
| 361795 | 2008 BN_{50} | — | January 18, 2008 | Kitt Peak | Spacewatch | WIT | 900 m | MPC · JPL |
| 361796 | 2008 BX_{53} | — | January 30, 2008 | Mount Lemmon | Mount Lemmon Survey | · | 3.8 km | MPC · JPL |
| 361797 | 2008 BA_{54} | — | January 31, 2008 | Mount Lemmon | Mount Lemmon Survey | · | 1.7 km | MPC · JPL |
| 361798 | 2008 CK_{16} | — | February 3, 2008 | Kitt Peak | Spacewatch | MRX | 1.1 km | MPC · JPL |
| 361799 | 2008 CR_{18} | — | February 3, 2008 | Kitt Peak | Spacewatch | · | 2.7 km | MPC · JPL |
| 361800 | 2008 CH_{20} | — | December 14, 2007 | Mount Lemmon | Mount Lemmon Survey | · | 1.7 km | MPC · JPL |

== 361801–361900 ==
back to top

| Designation | | | Discovery | | | Properties | | Ref |
| Permanent | Provisional | Named after | Date | Site | Discoverer(s) | Category | Diam. | Ref |
|---|---|---|---|---|---|---|---|---|
| 361801 | 2008 CR_{20} | — | February 2, 2008 | Mount Lemmon | Mount Lemmon Survey | · | 1.9 km | MPC · JPL |
| 361802 | 2008 CS_{20} | — | February 4, 2008 | La Sagra | OAM | · | 2.0 km | MPC · JPL |
| 361803 | 2008 CD_{24} | — | February 1, 2008 | Kitt Peak | Spacewatch | · | 3.0 km | MPC · JPL |
| 361804 | 2008 CD_{25} | — | February 1, 2008 | Kitt Peak | Spacewatch | · | 2.2 km | MPC · JPL |
| 361805 | 2008 CG_{30} | — | March 30, 2004 | Kitt Peak | Spacewatch | · | 2.1 km | MPC · JPL |
| 361806 | 2008 CA_{36} | — | February 2, 2008 | Kitt Peak | Spacewatch | · | 1.9 km | MPC · JPL |
| 361807 | 2008 CZ_{37} | — | February 2, 2008 | Kitt Peak | Spacewatch | · | 1.8 km | MPC · JPL |
| 361808 | 2008 CL_{38} | — | February 2, 2008 | Mount Lemmon | Mount Lemmon Survey | WIT | 1.1 km | MPC · JPL |
| 361809 | 2008 CD_{48} | — | February 3, 2008 | Catalina | CSS | · | 2.0 km | MPC · JPL |
| 361810 | 2008 CN_{50} | — | February 6, 2008 | Catalina | CSS | GEF | 1.5 km | MPC · JPL |
| 361811 | 2008 CT_{52} | — | February 7, 2008 | Kitt Peak | Spacewatch | NEM | 2.0 km | MPC · JPL |
| 361812 | 2008 CY_{58} | — | February 7, 2008 | Mount Lemmon | Mount Lemmon Survey | AGN | 1.0 km | MPC · JPL |
| 361813 | 2008 CN_{71} | — | February 6, 2008 | Catalina | CSS | · | 1.8 km | MPC · JPL |
| 361814 | 2008 CL_{73} | — | February 6, 2008 | Catalina | CSS | · | 2.6 km | MPC · JPL |
| 361815 | 2008 CB_{77} | — | February 6, 2008 | Catalina | CSS | · | 2.2 km | MPC · JPL |
| 361816 | 2008 CW_{90} | — | January 13, 2008 | Catalina | CSS | · | 2.1 km | MPC · JPL |
| 361817 | 2008 CC_{94} | — | February 8, 2008 | Mount Lemmon | Mount Lemmon Survey | AEO | 1.3 km | MPC · JPL |
| 361818 | 2008 CF_{101} | — | February 9, 2008 | Mount Lemmon | Mount Lemmon Survey | · | 1.3 km | MPC · JPL |
| 361819 | 2008 CE_{104} | — | February 9, 2008 | Mount Lemmon | Mount Lemmon Survey | · | 2.1 km | MPC · JPL |
| 361820 | 2008 CG_{108} | — | January 30, 2008 | Vail-Jarnac | Jarnac | · | 2.6 km | MPC · JPL |
| 361821 | 2008 CK_{128} | — | February 8, 2008 | Kitt Peak | Spacewatch | · | 1.7 km | MPC · JPL |
| 361822 | 2008 CF_{137} | — | February 8, 2008 | Mount Lemmon | Mount Lemmon Survey | · | 2.4 km | MPC · JPL |
| 361823 | 2008 CL_{147} | — | February 9, 2008 | Kitt Peak | Spacewatch | · | 2.2 km | MPC · JPL |
| 361824 | 2008 CG_{157} | — | February 9, 2008 | Kitt Peak | Spacewatch | · | 1.8 km | MPC · JPL |
| 361825 | 2008 CV_{165} | — | February 10, 2008 | Mount Lemmon | Mount Lemmon Survey | · | 2.1 km | MPC · JPL |
| 361826 | 2008 CB_{177} | — | February 10, 2008 | Socorro | LINEAR | · | 2.1 km | MPC · JPL |
| 361827 | 2008 CF_{178} | — | February 6, 2008 | Catalina | CSS | · | 2.6 km | MPC · JPL |
| 361828 | 2008 CX_{178} | — | February 6, 2008 | Catalina | CSS | · | 2.6 km | MPC · JPL |
| 361829 | 2008 CH_{187} | — | February 3, 2008 | Catalina | CSS | DOR | 2.3 km | MPC · JPL |
| 361830 | 2008 CO_{194} | — | February 11, 2008 | Mount Lemmon | Mount Lemmon Survey | · | 2.2 km | MPC · JPL |
| 361831 | 2008 CU_{200} | — | February 8, 2008 | Kitt Peak | Spacewatch | · | 2.1 km | MPC · JPL |
| 361832 | 2008 CS_{206} | — | February 10, 2008 | Kitt Peak | Spacewatch | AGN | 1 km | MPC · JPL |
| 361833 | 2008 CP_{212} | — | February 13, 2008 | Catalina | CSS | · | 2.1 km | MPC · JPL |
| 361834 | 2008 DW_{4} | — | February 27, 2008 | Bisei SG Center | BATTeRS | · | 2.2 km | MPC · JPL |
| 361835 | 2008 DK_{8} | — | February 24, 2008 | Mount Lemmon | Mount Lemmon Survey | · | 1.5 km | MPC · JPL |
| 361836 | 2008 DE_{11} | — | February 26, 2008 | Kitt Peak | Spacewatch | · | 2.2 km | MPC · JPL |
| 361837 | 2008 DK_{13} | — | February 26, 2008 | Kitt Peak | Spacewatch | · | 2.3 km | MPC · JPL |
| 361838 | 2008 DU_{14} | — | February 26, 2008 | Mount Lemmon | Mount Lemmon Survey | · | 2.1 km | MPC · JPL |
| 361839 | 2008 DL_{31} | — | February 27, 2008 | Kitt Peak | Spacewatch | · | 1.7 km | MPC · JPL |
| 361840 | 2008 DY_{33} | — | February 27, 2008 | Mount Lemmon | Mount Lemmon Survey | BRA | 2.0 km | MPC · JPL |
| 361841 | 2008 DG_{38} | — | February 27, 2008 | Kitt Peak | Spacewatch | · | 2.3 km | MPC · JPL |
| 361842 | 2008 DE_{39} | — | February 27, 2008 | Mount Lemmon | Mount Lemmon Survey | · | 2.1 km | MPC · JPL |
| 361843 | 2008 DR_{44} | — | February 28, 2008 | Mount Lemmon | Mount Lemmon Survey | · | 2.1 km | MPC · JPL |
| 361844 | 2008 DD_{47} | — | February 28, 2008 | Kitt Peak | Spacewatch | · | 2.2 km | MPC · JPL |
| 361845 | 2008 DL_{48} | — | February 28, 2008 | Kitt Peak | Spacewatch | · | 1.9 km | MPC · JPL |
| 361846 | 2008 DC_{52} | — | February 29, 2008 | Mount Lemmon | Mount Lemmon Survey | · | 2.2 km | MPC · JPL |
| 361847 | 2008 DW_{56} | — | February 28, 2008 | Mount Lemmon | Mount Lemmon Survey | · | 1.4 km | MPC · JPL |
| 361848 | 2008 DX_{60} | — | February 28, 2008 | Mount Lemmon | Mount Lemmon Survey | · | 2.1 km | MPC · JPL |
| 361849 | 2008 DF_{62} | — | February 28, 2008 | Kitt Peak | Spacewatch | · | 1.6 km | MPC · JPL |
| 361850 | 2008 DR_{70} | — | February 13, 2008 | Catalina | CSS | · | 2.5 km | MPC · JPL |
| 361851 | 2008 DG_{71} | — | February 28, 2008 | Mount Lemmon | Mount Lemmon Survey | HOF | 2.7 km | MPC · JPL |
| 361852 | 2008 DT_{77} | — | February 28, 2008 | Mount Lemmon | Mount Lemmon Survey | · | 1.9 km | MPC · JPL |
| 361853 | 2008 DQ_{82} | — | February 28, 2008 | Kitt Peak | Spacewatch | KOR | 1.7 km | MPC · JPL |
| 361854 | 2008 DM_{88} | — | February 18, 2008 | Mount Lemmon | Mount Lemmon Survey | · | 2.4 km | MPC · JPL |
| 361855 | 2008 EX_{1} | — | March 1, 2008 | Kitt Peak | Spacewatch | · | 2.5 km | MPC · JPL |
| 361856 | 2008 EO_{13} | — | March 1, 2008 | Kitt Peak | Spacewatch | · | 2.4 km | MPC · JPL |
| 361857 | 2008 EK_{23} | — | March 3, 2008 | Catalina | CSS | · | 2.4 km | MPC · JPL |
| 361858 | 2008 EH_{47} | — | March 5, 2008 | Mount Lemmon | Mount Lemmon Survey | · | 3.4 km | MPC · JPL |
| 361859 | 2008 ET_{57} | — | March 7, 2008 | Mount Lemmon | Mount Lemmon Survey | · | 1.8 km | MPC · JPL |
| 361860 | 2008 ED_{60} | — | March 8, 2008 | Catalina | CSS | · | 2.7 km | MPC · JPL |
| 361861 | 2008 ED_{69} | — | March 11, 2008 | Catalina | CSS | T_{j} (2.6) · APO +1km | 1.4 km | MPC · JPL |
| 361862 | 2008 EF_{71} | — | February 9, 2008 | Kitt Peak | Spacewatch | · | 2.1 km | MPC · JPL |
| 361863 | 2008 EH_{76} | — | March 7, 2008 | Mount Lemmon | Mount Lemmon Survey | H | 390 m | MPC · JPL |
| 361864 | 2008 EZ_{86} | — | March 7, 2008 | Kitt Peak | Spacewatch | GEF | 1.4 km | MPC · JPL |
| 361865 | 2008 ES_{93} | — | February 11, 2008 | Kitt Peak | Spacewatch | · | 2.9 km | MPC · JPL |
| 361866 | 2008 EA_{109} | — | March 7, 2008 | Mount Lemmon | Mount Lemmon Survey | · | 2.2 km | MPC · JPL |
| 361867 | 2008 EC_{126} | — | March 10, 2008 | Kitt Peak | Spacewatch | · | 2.2 km | MPC · JPL |
| 361868 | 2008 EB_{149} | — | March 2, 2008 | Kitt Peak | Spacewatch | GEF | 1.1 km | MPC · JPL |
| 361869 | 2008 EY_{166} | — | March 7, 2008 | Catalina | CSS | · | 2.6 km | MPC · JPL |
| 361870 | 2008 FL_{9} | — | March 26, 2008 | Kitt Peak | Spacewatch | KOR | 1.4 km | MPC · JPL |
| 361871 | 2008 FJ_{12} | — | March 26, 2008 | Mount Lemmon | Mount Lemmon Survey | · | 2.1 km | MPC · JPL |
| 361872 | 2008 FR_{14} | — | March 26, 2008 | Mount Lemmon | Mount Lemmon Survey | · | 1.8 km | MPC · JPL |
| 361873 | 2008 FD_{16} | — | March 27, 2008 | Kitt Peak | Spacewatch | · | 2.3 km | MPC · JPL |
| 361874 | 2008 FX_{17} | — | August 28, 2005 | Kitt Peak | Spacewatch | · | 2.0 km | MPC · JPL |
| 361875 | 2008 FU_{22} | — | March 27, 2008 | Kitt Peak | Spacewatch | · | 1.9 km | MPC · JPL |
| 361876 | 2008 FG_{29} | — | March 28, 2008 | Kitt Peak | Spacewatch | H | 440 m | MPC · JPL |
| 361877 | 2008 FT_{36} | — | March 28, 2008 | Mount Lemmon | Mount Lemmon Survey | · | 2.1 km | MPC · JPL |
| 361878 | 2008 FN_{54} | — | March 28, 2008 | Mount Lemmon | Mount Lemmon Survey | · | 2.3 km | MPC · JPL |
| 361879 | 2008 FQ_{54} | — | February 28, 2008 | Mount Lemmon | Mount Lemmon Survey | · | 2.7 km | MPC · JPL |
| 361880 | 2008 FF_{55} | — | March 28, 2008 | Mount Lemmon | Mount Lemmon Survey | · | 1.9 km | MPC · JPL |
| 361881 | 2008 FJ_{58} | — | April 25, 2003 | Campo Imperatore | CINEOS | · | 2.1 km | MPC · JPL |
| 361882 | 2008 FE_{65} | — | March 28, 2008 | Kitt Peak | Spacewatch | · | 3.3 km | MPC · JPL |
| 361883 | 2008 FP_{66} | — | March 28, 2008 | Kitt Peak | Spacewatch | · | 3.6 km | MPC · JPL |
| 361884 | 2008 FM_{70} | — | March 28, 2008 | Kitt Peak | Spacewatch | · | 3.2 km | MPC · JPL |
| 361885 | 2008 FF_{75} | — | December 11, 2006 | Kitt Peak | Spacewatch | · | 2.3 km | MPC · JPL |
| 361886 | 2008 FD_{79} | — | March 27, 2008 | Mount Lemmon | Mount Lemmon Survey | · | 1.5 km | MPC · JPL |
| 361887 | 2008 FZ_{81} | — | September 13, 2005 | Kitt Peak | Spacewatch | · | 2.1 km | MPC · JPL |
| 361888 | 2008 FP_{89} | — | January 13, 2008 | Kitt Peak | Spacewatch | · | 1.9 km | MPC · JPL |
| 361889 | 2008 FV_{89} | — | February 11, 2008 | Kitt Peak | Spacewatch | · | 2.2 km | MPC · JPL |
| 361890 | 2008 FV_{93} | — | March 29, 2008 | Kitt Peak | Spacewatch | · | 2.0 km | MPC · JPL |
| 361891 | 2008 FP_{100} | — | March 30, 2008 | Kitt Peak | Spacewatch | · | 2.7 km | MPC · JPL |
| 361892 | 2008 FO_{116} | — | March 27, 2008 | Kitt Peak | Spacewatch | · | 3.0 km | MPC · JPL |
| 361893 | 2008 FF_{121} | — | August 6, 2004 | Palomar | NEAT | · | 3.4 km | MPC · JPL |
| 361894 | 2008 FP_{124} | — | March 30, 2008 | Kitt Peak | Spacewatch | · | 2.2 km | MPC · JPL |
| 361895 | 2008 FS_{130} | — | March 30, 2008 | Kitt Peak | Spacewatch | · | 2.0 km | MPC · JPL |
| 361896 | 2008 FU_{134} | — | March 30, 2008 | Kitt Peak | Spacewatch | · | 2.5 km | MPC · JPL |
| 361897 | 2008 GN_{2} | — | February 13, 2008 | Mount Lemmon | Mount Lemmon Survey | · | 1.9 km | MPC · JPL |
| 361898 | 2008 GN_{5} | — | April 1, 2008 | Kitt Peak | Spacewatch | MRX | 1.1 km | MPC · JPL |
| 361899 | 2008 GW_{14} | — | April 3, 2008 | Mount Lemmon | Mount Lemmon Survey | · | 2.1 km | MPC · JPL |
| 361900 | 2008 GC_{17} | — | April 3, 2008 | Kitt Peak | Spacewatch | · | 2.5 km | MPC · JPL |

== 361901–362000 ==
back to top

| Designation | | | Discovery | | | Properties | | Ref |
| Permanent | Provisional | Named after | Date | Site | Discoverer(s) | Category | Diam. | Ref |
|---|---|---|---|---|---|---|---|---|
| 361901 | 2008 GX_{19} | — | April 4, 2008 | Kitt Peak | Spacewatch | · | 4.4 km | MPC · JPL |
| 361902 | 2008 GJ_{31} | — | April 3, 2008 | Kitt Peak | Spacewatch | · | 2.4 km | MPC · JPL |
| 361903 | 2008 GH_{33} | — | April 3, 2008 | Mount Lemmon | Mount Lemmon Survey | · | 2.7 km | MPC · JPL |
| 361904 | 2008 GJ_{36} | — | April 3, 2008 | Kitt Peak | Spacewatch | · | 3.1 km | MPC · JPL |
| 361905 | 2008 GE_{38} | — | April 3, 2008 | Kitt Peak | Spacewatch | · | 2.2 km | MPC · JPL |
| 361906 | 2008 GV_{40} | — | April 4, 2008 | Kitt Peak | Spacewatch | · | 2.2 km | MPC · JPL |
| 361907 | 2008 GK_{42} | — | April 4, 2008 | Kitt Peak | Spacewatch | EOS | 2.3 km | MPC · JPL |
| 361908 | 2008 GR_{47} | — | April 4, 2008 | Kitt Peak | Spacewatch | · | 3.5 km | MPC · JPL |
| 361909 | 2008 GY_{59} | — | August 25, 2004 | Kitt Peak | Spacewatch | EOS | 1.8 km | MPC · JPL |
| 361910 | 2008 GL_{67} | — | March 28, 2008 | Mount Lemmon | Mount Lemmon Survey | EMA | 4.3 km | MPC · JPL |
| 361911 | 2008 GK_{68} | — | April 6, 2008 | Kitt Peak | Spacewatch | TIR | 2.6 km | MPC · JPL |
| 361912 | 2008 GP_{92} | — | April 6, 2008 | Kitt Peak | Spacewatch | · | 2.3 km | MPC · JPL |
| 361913 | 2008 GE_{97} | — | November 21, 2005 | Kitt Peak | Spacewatch | · | 2.3 km | MPC · JPL |
| 361914 | 2008 GH_{97} | — | April 4, 2008 | Kitt Peak | Spacewatch | · | 3.4 km | MPC · JPL |
| 361915 | 2008 GW_{97} | — | April 8, 2008 | Kitt Peak | Spacewatch | · | 3.3 km | MPC · JPL |
| 361916 | 2008 GE_{98} | — | April 8, 2008 | Kitt Peak | Spacewatch | · | 3.3 km | MPC · JPL |
| 361917 | 2008 GQ_{102} | — | April 10, 2008 | Kitt Peak | Spacewatch | HYG | 3.7 km | MPC · JPL |
| 361918 | 2008 GV_{102} | — | April 10, 2008 | Kitt Peak | Spacewatch | EOS | 2.0 km | MPC · JPL |
| 361919 | 2008 GK_{103} | — | April 11, 2008 | Kitt Peak | Spacewatch | · | 2.2 km | MPC · JPL |
| 361920 | 2008 GM_{110} | — | April 1, 2008 | Catalina | CSS | · | 2.7 km | MPC · JPL |
| 361921 | 2008 GV_{112} | — | April 13, 2008 | Catalina | CSS | H | 510 m | MPC · JPL |
| 361922 | 2008 GL_{121} | — | April 13, 2008 | Kitt Peak | Spacewatch | · | 5.0 km | MPC · JPL |
| 361923 | 2008 GS_{126} | — | April 14, 2008 | Mount Lemmon | Mount Lemmon Survey | · | 2.4 km | MPC · JPL |
| 361924 | 2008 GW_{127} | — | April 14, 2008 | Mount Lemmon | Mount Lemmon Survey | EOS | 2.1 km | MPC · JPL |
| 361925 | 2008 GL_{132} | — | April 13, 2008 | Mount Lemmon | Mount Lemmon Survey | · | 4.4 km | MPC · JPL |
| 361926 | 2008 GU_{132} | — | April 14, 2008 | Mount Lemmon | Mount Lemmon Survey | · | 3.5 km | MPC · JPL |
| 361927 | 2008 GD_{133} | — | April 15, 2008 | Mount Lemmon | Mount Lemmon Survey | · | 3.0 km | MPC · JPL |
| 361928 | 2008 GC_{134} | — | April 13, 2008 | Mount Lemmon | Mount Lemmon Survey | · | 3.6 km | MPC · JPL |
| 361929 | 2008 GA_{135} | — | April 12, 2008 | Kitt Peak | Spacewatch | · | 3.1 km | MPC · JPL |
| 361930 | 2008 GR_{140} | — | April 9, 2008 | Kitt Peak | Spacewatch | · | 2.2 km | MPC · JPL |
| 361931 | 2008 GE_{146} | — | April 14, 2008 | Mount Lemmon | Mount Lemmon Survey | · | 3.1 km | MPC · JPL |
| 361932 | 2008 HK_{5} | — | April 24, 2008 | Kitt Peak | Spacewatch | · | 2.1 km | MPC · JPL |
| 361933 | 2008 HP_{7} | — | April 24, 2008 | Kitt Peak | Spacewatch | TIR | 3.4 km | MPC · JPL |
| 361934 | 2008 HD_{16} | — | April 25, 2008 | Kitt Peak | Spacewatch | · | 3.8 km | MPC · JPL |
| 361935 | 2008 HF_{18} | — | April 26, 2008 | Kitt Peak | Spacewatch | · | 3.3 km | MPC · JPL |
| 361936 | 2008 HO_{24} | — | April 27, 2008 | Kitt Peak | Spacewatch | EOS | 1.9 km | MPC · JPL |
| 361937 | 2008 HJ_{27} | — | April 27, 2008 | Mount Lemmon | Mount Lemmon Survey | EOS | 3.5 km | MPC · JPL |
| 361938 | 2008 HS_{33} | — | April 26, 2008 | Kitt Peak | Spacewatch | EUP | 3.4 km | MPC · JPL |
| 361939 | 2008 HY_{38} | — | April 26, 2008 | Mount Lemmon | Mount Lemmon Survey | · | 1.6 km | MPC · JPL |
| 361940 | 2008 HF_{44} | — | April 16, 2008 | Mount Lemmon | Mount Lemmon Survey | · | 2.9 km | MPC · JPL |
| 361941 | 2008 HK_{50} | — | April 29, 2008 | Kitt Peak | Spacewatch | · | 3.5 km | MPC · JPL |
| 361942 | 2008 HC_{52} | — | April 29, 2008 | Mount Lemmon | Mount Lemmon Survey | · | 1.7 km | MPC · JPL |
| 361943 | 2008 HW_{52} | — | April 1, 2008 | Kitt Peak | Spacewatch | · | 2.8 km | MPC · JPL |
| 361944 | 2008 HL_{53} | — | April 29, 2008 | Kitt Peak | Spacewatch | · | 3.4 km | MPC · JPL |
| 361945 | 2008 HO_{57} | — | April 30, 2008 | Kitt Peak | Spacewatch | · | 3.3 km | MPC · JPL |
| 361946 | 2008 HV_{58} | — | April 30, 2008 | Mount Lemmon | Mount Lemmon Survey | · | 3.0 km | MPC · JPL |
| 361947 | 2008 HE_{62} | — | April 30, 2008 | Kitt Peak | Spacewatch | · | 2.6 km | MPC · JPL |
| 361948 | 2008 HK_{62} | — | April 30, 2008 | Kitt Peak | Spacewatch | · | 3.0 km | MPC · JPL |
| 361949 | 2008 HM_{62} | — | April 30, 2008 | Kitt Peak | Spacewatch | · | 3.0 km | MPC · JPL |
| 361950 | 2008 HD_{64} | — | April 29, 2008 | Mount Lemmon | Mount Lemmon Survey | · | 3.2 km | MPC · JPL |
| 361951 | 2008 JO_{2} | — | January 24, 2007 | Mount Lemmon | Mount Lemmon Survey | · | 2.3 km | MPC · JPL |
| 361952 | 2008 JM_{5} | — | May 3, 2008 | Mount Lemmon | Mount Lemmon Survey | · | 2.4 km | MPC · JPL |
| 361953 | 2008 JY_{5} | — | May 1, 2008 | Catalina | CSS | · | 3.0 km | MPC · JPL |
| 361954 | 2008 JV_{6} | — | May 2, 2008 | Kitt Peak | Spacewatch | · | 2.9 km | MPC · JPL |
| 361955 | 2008 JB_{9} | — | April 3, 2008 | Mount Lemmon | Mount Lemmon Survey | · | 4.1 km | MPC · JPL |
| 361956 | 2008 JW_{12} | — | January 26, 2007 | Kitt Peak | Spacewatch | · | 2.1 km | MPC · JPL |
| 361957 | 2008 JC_{15} | — | May 3, 2008 | Catalina | CSS | · | 4.7 km | MPC · JPL |
| 361958 | 2008 JR_{17} | — | May 4, 2008 | Kitt Peak | Spacewatch | · | 2.8 km | MPC · JPL |
| 361959 | 2008 JT_{17} | — | April 14, 2008 | Mount Lemmon | Mount Lemmon Survey | · | 3.6 km | MPC · JPL |
| 361960 | 2008 JC_{18} | — | May 4, 2008 | Kitt Peak | Spacewatch | · | 3.0 km | MPC · JPL |
| 361961 | 2008 JK_{18} | — | May 4, 2008 | Kitt Peak | Spacewatch | · | 2.5 km | MPC · JPL |
| 361962 | 2008 JY_{21} | — | April 5, 2002 | Palomar | NEAT | · | 3.2 km | MPC · JPL |
| 361963 | 2008 JZ_{21} | — | May 6, 2008 | Kitt Peak | Spacewatch | · | 1.9 km | MPC · JPL |
| 361964 | 2008 JC_{30} | — | May 11, 2008 | Kitt Peak | Spacewatch | · | 2.5 km | MPC · JPL |
| 361965 | 2008 JC_{31} | — | May 5, 2008 | Kitt Peak | Spacewatch | EOS | 2.3 km | MPC · JPL |
| 361966 | 2008 JE_{32} | — | May 6, 2008 | Mount Lemmon | Mount Lemmon Survey | EOS | 2.5 km | MPC · JPL |
| 361967 | 2008 JG_{33} | — | May 8, 2008 | Mount Lemmon | Mount Lemmon Survey | · | 3.2 km | MPC · JPL |
| 361968 | 2008 JN_{36} | — | May 3, 2008 | Kitt Peak | Spacewatch | · | 3.7 km | MPC · JPL |
| 361969 | 2008 JF_{37} | — | May 14, 2008 | Mount Lemmon | Mount Lemmon Survey | · | 5.1 km | MPC · JPL |
| 361970 | 2008 JV_{37} | — | May 6, 2008 | Mount Lemmon | Mount Lemmon Survey | · | 2.6 km | MPC · JPL |
| 361971 | 2008 KY_{1} | — | May 26, 2008 | Kitt Peak | Spacewatch | H | 590 m | MPC · JPL |
| 361972 | 2008 KE_{7} | — | April 30, 2008 | Mount Lemmon | Mount Lemmon Survey | EOS | 2.3 km | MPC · JPL |
| 361973 | 2008 KC_{11} | — | May 29, 2008 | Mount Lemmon | Mount Lemmon Survey | · | 2.0 km | MPC · JPL |
| 361974 | 2008 KM_{12} | — | May 26, 2008 | Kitt Peak | Spacewatch | · | 3.5 km | MPC · JPL |
| 361975 | 2008 KP_{15} | — | May 27, 2008 | Kitt Peak | Spacewatch | · | 3.4 km | MPC · JPL |
| 361976 | 2008 KO_{16} | — | May 27, 2008 | Kitt Peak | Spacewatch | EOS | 1.9 km | MPC · JPL |
| 361977 | 2008 KS_{16} | — | May 16, 2008 | Kitt Peak | Spacewatch | EOS | 2.1 km | MPC · JPL |
| 361978 | 2008 KO_{19} | — | October 9, 2004 | Kitt Peak | Spacewatch | · | 3.0 km | MPC · JPL |
| 361979 | 2008 KB_{31} | — | May 29, 2008 | Kitt Peak | Spacewatch | · | 2.4 km | MPC · JPL |
| 361980 | 2008 KA_{39} | — | December 27, 2006 | Mount Lemmon | Mount Lemmon Survey | · | 2.4 km | MPC · JPL |
| 361981 | 2008 KL_{42} | — | May 31, 2008 | Mount Lemmon | Mount Lemmon Survey | · | 2.6 km | MPC · JPL |
| 361982 | 2008 LD_{6} | — | April 11, 2008 | Kitt Peak | Spacewatch | · | 2.8 km | MPC · JPL |
| 361983 | 2008 LR_{11} | — | April 30, 2008 | Mount Lemmon | Mount Lemmon Survey | · | 2.9 km | MPC · JPL |
| 361984 | 2008 LK_{12} | — | June 9, 2008 | Farra d'Isonzo | Farra d'Isonzo | H | 540 m | MPC · JPL |
| 361985 | 2008 LW_{13} | — | June 7, 2008 | Kitt Peak | Spacewatch | · | 2.7 km | MPC · JPL |
| 361986 | 2008 LR_{14} | — | June 8, 2008 | Kitt Peak | Spacewatch | VER | 2.8 km | MPC · JPL |
| 361987 | 2008 MB | — | May 5, 2008 | Kitt Peak | Spacewatch | · | 2.9 km | MPC · JPL |
| 361988 | 2008 NA_{4} | — | July 11, 2008 | Siding Spring | SSS | · | 6.6 km | MPC · JPL |
| 361989 | 2008 QQ_{15} | — | August 27, 2008 | Dauban | Kugel, F. | · | 2.4 km | MPC · JPL |
| 361990 | 2008 RA_{25} | — | September 2, 2008 | Goodricke-Pigott | R. A. Tucker | · | 4.7 km | MPC · JPL |
| 361991 | 2008 RY_{123} | — | September 6, 2008 | Kitt Peak | Spacewatch | 3:2 · SHU | 4.8 km | MPC · JPL |
| 361992 | 2008 SM_{89} | — | September 21, 2008 | Kitt Peak | Spacewatch | · | 3.2 km | MPC · JPL |
| 361993 | 2008 SS_{127} | — | September 22, 2008 | Kitt Peak | Spacewatch | · | 670 m | MPC · JPL |
| 361994 | 2008 SO_{204} | — | September 26, 2008 | Kitt Peak | Spacewatch | · | 760 m | MPC · JPL |
| 361995 | 2008 SQ_{226} | — | September 27, 2008 | Mount Lemmon | Mount Lemmon Survey | · | 760 m | MPC · JPL |
| 361996 | 2008 SP_{270} | — | September 24, 2008 | Kitt Peak | Spacewatch | · | 740 m | MPC · JPL |
| 361997 | 2008 SP_{302} | — | September 23, 2008 | Kitt Peak | Spacewatch | · | 650 m | MPC · JPL |
| 361998 | 2008 TS_{91} | — | October 4, 2008 | La Sagra | OAM | · | 730 m | MPC · JPL |
| 361999 | 2008 TV_{96} | — | October 6, 2008 | Kitt Peak | Spacewatch | L4 · ERY | 9.1 km | MPC · JPL |
| 362000 | 2008 TR_{117} | — | October 6, 2008 | Kitt Peak | Spacewatch | · | 640 m | MPC · JPL |

back to top

== See also ==
- Meanings of minor-planet names: 361001–362000
