= List of named minor planets: 350000–399999 =

This is a partial list of named minor planets in numerical order. It contains a total of 254 entries as of 19 October 2026. Minor planets for which no article exist are displayed in grey color and redirect to the list of minor planets (see List of minor planets § Main index).

== From 350,000 to 399,999 ==
- 350032 Josephhunt
- 350173 Yoshidanaoki
- 350178 Eisleben
- 350185 Linnell
- 350509 Vepřoknedlozelo
- 350838 Gorelysheva
- 350969 Boiohaemum
- 351785 Reguly
- 351791 Karenkazuki
- 351976 Borromini
- 352017 Juvarra
- 352148 Tarcisiozani
- 352214 Szczecin
- 352273 Turrell
- 352333 Sylvievauclair
- 352646 Blumbahs
- 352655 Alekna
- 352704 Stevefleming
- 352760 Tesorero
- 352782 Karelschrijver
- 352834 Málaga
- 352860 Monflier
- 353171 Cosmebauçà
- 353189 Iasus
- 353194 Meilutytė
- 353232 Nolwenn
- 353404 Laugalys
- 353409 Onaka
- 353429 Fairlamb
- 353432 Cabrerabalears
- 353577 Gediminas
- 353595 Grancanaria
- 353677 Harald
- 353682 Maberry
- 353730 Patton
- 353745 Williamunruh
- 353817 Bolduc-Duval
- 353903 Kudritzki
- 354659 Boileau
- 354903 Shostak
- 355022 Triman
- 355029 Herve
- 355256 Margarethekahn
- 355276 Leclair
- 355657 Poppy
- 355704 Wangyinglai
- 356217 Clymene
- 356786 Shuike
- 356863 Maathai
- 356975 Aspriliopacelli
- 357106 Pacholka
- 357116 Attivissimo
- 357148 El-Maarry
- 357243 Jefferies
- 357546 Edwardhalbach
- 358167 Barbaralong
- 358179 Szegőkároly
- 358376 Gwyn
- 358675 Bente
- 358894 Demetrescu
- 359103 Ottopiene
- 359426 Lacks
- 359474 Robertwilliams
- 359822 Hansboesgaard
- 360037 Robertson
- 360072 Alcimedon
- 360762 FRIPON
- 361183 Tandon
- 361193 Cheungtaklung
- 361267 ʻIʻiwi
- 361450 Houellebecq
- 361524 Klimka
- 361530 Victorfranzhess
- 361690 Laurelanmaurer
- 361707 Pharmauni
- 361712 Liuhui
- 361764 Antonbuslov
- 362177 Anji
- 362238 Shisseh
- 362316 Dogora
- 362420 Rolandgarros
- 362793 Suetolson
- 362911 Miguelhurtado
- 363018 Wenda
- 363115 Chuckwood
- 363124 Ciottolimeco
- 363504 Belleau
- 363582 Folpotat
- 363623 Chelčický
- 363706 Karazija
- 364166 Trebek
- 364192 Qianruhu
- 364264 Martymartina
- 364566 Yurga
- 364577 Cachopito
- 364630 Shizuoka
- 364636 Ulrikeecker
- 364875 Hualookeng
- 365130 Birnfeld
- 365131 Hassberge
- 365159 Garching
- 365190 Kenting
- 365250 Vladimirsurdin
- 365375 Serebrov
- 365443 Holiday
- 365604 Rusholme
- 365739 Peterbecker
- 365756 ISON
- 365761 Popovici
- 365786 Florencelosse
- 366252 Evanmillsap
- 366272 Medellín
- 366487 Neilyoung
- 366689 Rohrbaugh
- 366852 Ti
- 367228 Johannahaslehner
- 367392 Zeri
- 367404 Andreasrebers
- 367406 Buser
- 367436 Siena
- 367488 Aloisortner
- 367633 Shargorodskij
- 367693 Montmagastrell
- 367732 Mikesimonsen
- 367943 Duende
- 368116 Half-Moon
- 368588 Lazrek
- 368617 Sebastiánotero
- 368704 Roelgathier
- 368719 Asparuh
- 369010 Ira
- 369088 Marcus
- 369134 Mariareiche
- 369297 Nazca
- 369423 Quintegr'al
- 370068 Chrisholmberg
- 370796 Gasiūnas
- 371220 Angers
- 372024 Ayapani
- 372305 Bourdeille
- 372573 Pietromenga
- 372578 Khromov
- 372626 IGEM
- 374131 Vitkauskas
- 374338 Fontana
- 374354 Pesquet
- 374710 ʻOʻo
- 374715 Dimpourbaix
- 374848 Arturomalignani
- 375005 Newsome
- 375007 Buxy
- 375043 Zengweizhou
- 375067 Hewins
- 375176 Béziau
- 375303 Ikerjiménez
- 375798 Divini
- 375832 Yurijmedvedev
- 375927 Ibara
- 376029 Blahová
- 376084 Annettepeter
- 376299 Friesen
- 376311 Naidubezawada
- 376574 Michalkusiak
- 376694 Kassák
- 377108 Spoelie
- 377144 Okietex
- 378002 ʻAkialoa
- 378076 Campani
- 378204 Bettyhesser
- 378214 Sauron
- 378370 Orton
- 378669 Rivas
- 378721 Thizy
- 378810 Deniserothrock
- 378917 Stefankarge
- 378920 Vassimre
- 379130 Lopresti
- 379155 Volkerheinrich
- 379173 Gamaovalia
- 379470 Carolynjones
- 379732 Oklay
- 379767 Barcis
- 380480 Glennhawley
- 380607 Sharma
- 380832 Annecambridge
- 381048 Werber
- 381260 Ouellette
- 381323 Fanjinshi
- 381458 Moiseenko
- 381725 Bobrinsky
- 381904 Beatita
- 382238 Euphemus
- 382900 Rendelmann
- 383067 Stoofke
- 383417 DAO
- 383492 Aubert
- 383508 Vadrot
- 383622 Luigivolta
- 384282 Evgeniyegorov
- 384533 Tenerelli
- 384582 Juliasmith
- 384584 Jenniferlawrence
- 384815 Żołnowski
- 385205 Michelvancamp
- 385446 Manwë
- 385571 Otrera
- 385695 Clete
- 385980 Emiliosegrè
- 386056 Tauragė
- 386528 Walterfürtig
- 386618 Accomazzo
- 386622 New Zealand
- 386851 Streep
- 388282 ʻAkepa
- 388370 Paulblu
- 389293 Hasubick
- 389470 Jan
- 389478 Rivera-Valentín
- 390743 Telkesmária
- 390813 Debwatson
- 390848 Veerle
- 391042 Dubietis
- 391257 Wilwheaton
- 391496 Colineldridge
- 391532 Markdowning
- 391795 Univofutah
- 391947 Tanithlee
- 391988 Illmárton
- 391996 Zhunenghong
- 392070 Siurell
- 392120 Heidiursula
- 392142 Solheim
- 392225 Lanzarote
- 392440 Klimavičius
- 392655 Fengmin
- 392728 Zdzisławłączny
- 392952 Hermitageshelter
- 394445 Unst
- 395124 Astonepia
- 395141 Césarmanrique
- 395148 Kurnin
- 395231 Leónscott
- 396931 Nerliluca
- 397278 Arvidson
- 397279 Bloomsburg
- 397800 Costaillobera
- 398045 Vitudurum
- 398188 Agni
- 399411 Ayiomamitis
- 399442 Radicofani
- 399565 Dévényanna
- 399673 Kadenyuk
- 399745 Ouchaou
- 399979 Lewseaman
back to top

== See also ==
- List of minor planet discoverers
- List of observatory codes
- Meanings of minor planet names § Index
