= Meanings of minor-planet names: 392001–393000 =

As minor planet discoveries are confirmed, they are given a permanent number by the IAU's Minor Planet Center (MPC), and the discoverers can then submit names for them, following the IAU's naming conventions. The list below concerns those minor planets in the specified number-range that have received names, and explains the meanings of those names.

Official naming citations of newly named small Solar System bodies are approved and published in a bulletin by IAU's Working Group for Small Bodies Nomenclature (WGSBN). Before May 2021, citations were published in MPC's Minor Planet Circulars for many decades. Recent citations can also be found on the JPL Small-Body Database (SBDB). Until his death in 2016, German astronomer Lutz D. Schmadel compiled these citations into the Dictionary of Minor Planet Names (DMP) and regularly updated the collection.

Based on Paul Herget's The Names of the Minor Planets, Schmadel also researched the unclear origin of numerous asteroids, most of which had been named prior to World War II. This article incorporates text from this source, which is in the public domain: SBDB New namings may only be added to this list below after official publication as the preannouncement of names is condemned. The WGSBN publishes a comprehensive guideline for the naming rules of non-cometary small Solar System bodies.

== 392001–392100 ==
Named minor planet	Provisional	This minor planet was named for...	Ref · Catalog
392070 Siurell	2009 CB_{55}	Siurell are handcrafted figurines from Mallorca. A long time ago they were used by shepherds to communicate with their livestock, although they are now mostly decorative.	JPL · 392070

== 392101–392200 ==
back to top

Named minor planet	Provisional	This minor planet was named for...	Ref · Catalog
392120 Heidiursula	2009 FK_{30}	Heidi Ursula Wallon Pizarro (born 1971), spouse of the discoverer Michael Todd.	JPL · 392120
392142 Solheim	2009 HV_{19}	Jan Erik Solheim (born 1938), Norwegian astronomer.	JPL · 392142

== 392201–392300 ==
back to top

Named minor planet	Provisional	This minor planet was named for...	Ref · Catalog
392225 Lanzarote	2009 UN_{128}	Lanzarote is a volcanic island, one of the seven Canary Islands in the Atlantic Ocean.	JPL · 392225

== 392301–392400 ==
back to top

Named minor planet	Provisional	This minor planet was named for...	Ref · Catalog
There are no named minor planets in this number range

== 392401–392500 ==
back to top

Named minor planet	Provisional	This minor planet was named for...	Ref · Catalog
392440 Klimavičius	2010 RH_{120}	Jonas Klimavičius, Lithuanian amateur astronomer.	IAU · 392440

== 392501–392600 ==
back to top

Named minor planet	Provisional	This minor planet was named for...	Ref · Catalog
There are no named minor planets in this number range

== 392601–392700 ==
back to top

Named minor planet	Provisional	This minor planet was named for...	Ref · Catalog
392655 Fengmin	2011 UL_{205}	Feng Min (born 1940), a researcher of Chinese Academy of Sciences, is an expert in the modern application of traditional Chinese medicine. He led the team that was the first to extract Ganoderma lucidum spore oil.	IAU · 392655

== 392701–392800 ==
back to top

Named minor planet	Provisional	This minor planet was named for...	Ref · Catalog
392728 Zdzisławłączny	2012 QJ_{52}	Zdzisław Łączny (born 1947), who has demonstrated an extraordinary knowledge, help and kindness in the construction of astronomical observatories. He is a Polish electronics engineer and designer of the electronic components that allowed the automation and remote control of Rantiga Osservatorio.	JPL · 392728

== 392801–392900 ==
back to top

Named minor planet	Provisional	This minor planet was named for...	Ref · Catalog
There are no named minor planets in this number range

== 392901–393000 ==
back to top

Named minor planet	Provisional	This minor planet was named for...	Ref · Catalog
392952 Hermitageshelter	2012 WT_{20}	The Hermitage, founded in 1965, is a nonprofit no-kill animal shelter in Tucson, Arizona.	IAU · 392952

back to top

Preceded by 391,001–392,000	Meanings of minor-planet names List of minor planets: 392,001–393,000	Succeeded by 393,001–394,000
