= List of minor planets: 392001–393000 =

The following is a partial list of minor planets, running from minor-planet number 392001 through 393000, inclusive. The primary data for this and other partial lists is based on JPL's "Small-Body Orbital Elements" and data available from the Minor Planet Center. Critical list information is also provided by the MPC, unless otherwise specified from Lowell Observatory. A detailed description of the table's columns and additional sources are given on the main page including a complete list of every page in this series, and a statistical break-up on the dynamical classification of minor planets.

Also see the summary list of all named bodies in numerical and alphabetical order, and the corresponding naming citations for the number range of this particular list. New namings may only be added to this list after official publication, as the preannouncement of names is condemned by the Working Group for Small Bodies Nomenclature of the International Astronomical Union.

Near-Earth obj.	MBA (inner)	MBA (outer)	Centaur
Mars-crosser	MBA (middle)	Jupiter trojan	Trans-Neptunian obj.
Unclassified

== 392001–392100 ==
Designation			Discovery			Properties		Ref
Permanent	Provisional	Named after	Date	Site	Discoverer(s)	Category	Diam.	Ref
392001	2008 YH_{124}	—	December 4, 2008	Mount Lemmon	Mount Lemmon Survey	·	2.1 km	MPC · JPL
392002	2008 YK_{127}	—	December 30, 2008	Kitt Peak	Spacewatch	·	1.5 km	MPC · JPL
392003	2008 YJ_{133}	—	December 29, 2008	Kitt Peak	Spacewatch	·	2.1 km	MPC · JPL
392004	2008 YJ_{136}	—	December 30, 2008	Kitt Peak	Spacewatch	HNS	1.2 km	MPC · JPL
392005	2008 YH_{140}	—	December 30, 2008	Mount Lemmon	Mount Lemmon Survey	·	1.8 km	MPC · JPL
392006	2008 YF_{146}	—	December 30, 2008	Kitt Peak	Spacewatch	·	2.5 km	MPC · JPL
392007	2008 YO_{153}	—	December 21, 2008	Kitt Peak	Spacewatch	·	2.2 km	MPC · JPL
392008	2008 YC_{158}	—	December 30, 2008	Mount Lemmon	Mount Lemmon Survey	·	1.8 km	MPC · JPL
392009	2008 YV_{161}	—	October 11, 2007	Mount Lemmon	Mount Lemmon Survey	GEF	1.4 km	MPC · JPL
392010	2008 YQ_{167}	—	December 21, 2008	Kitt Peak	Spacewatch	·	1.7 km	MPC · JPL
392011	2008 YG_{169}	—	December 22, 2008	Mount Lemmon	Mount Lemmon Survey	·	1.7 km	MPC · JPL
392012	2009 AN_{4}	—	January 1, 2009	Kitt Peak	Spacewatch	·	1.7 km	MPC · JPL
392013	2009 AL_{9}	—	January 2, 2009	Mount Lemmon	Mount Lemmon Survey	·	1.4 km	MPC · JPL
392014	2009 AG_{11}	—	January 2, 2009	Mount Lemmon	Mount Lemmon Survey	·	1.5 km	MPC · JPL
392015	2009 AO_{14}	—	January 2, 2009	Mount Lemmon	Mount Lemmon Survey	KON	2.6 km	MPC · JPL
392016	2009 AK_{21}	—	December 22, 2008	Kitt Peak	Spacewatch	·	1.9 km	MPC · JPL
392017	2009 AX_{25}	—	January 2, 2009	Kitt Peak	Spacewatch	·	1.4 km	MPC · JPL
392018	2009 AZ_{35}	—	October 24, 2008	Mount Lemmon	Mount Lemmon Survey	·	1.9 km	MPC · JPL
392019	2009 AR_{46}	—	January 3, 2009	Mount Lemmon	Mount Lemmon Survey	·	1.7 km	MPC · JPL
392020	2009 AW_{49}	—	December 22, 2008	Kitt Peak	Spacewatch	·	2.8 km	MPC · JPL
392021	2009 AW_{50}	—	January 1, 2009	Mount Lemmon	Mount Lemmon Survey	·	1.9 km	MPC · JPL
392022	2009 BA_{2}	—	June 17, 2005	Mount Lemmon	Mount Lemmon Survey	·	620 m	MPC · JPL
392023	2009 BS_{8}	—	December 21, 2008	Kitt Peak	Spacewatch	·	1.7 km	MPC · JPL
392024	2009 BR_{11}	—	January 20, 2009	Socorro	LINEAR	DOR	2.5 km	MPC · JPL
392025	2009 BS_{25}	—	December 29, 2008	Mount Lemmon	Mount Lemmon Survey	AGN	1.3 km	MPC · JPL
392026	2009 BQ_{27}	—	January 16, 2009	Kitt Peak	Spacewatch	·	1.5 km	MPC · JPL
392027	2009 BL_{31}	—	January 16, 2009	Kitt Peak	Spacewatch	·	1.9 km	MPC · JPL
392028	2009 BM_{32}	—	December 22, 2008	Kitt Peak	Spacewatch	·	1.7 km	MPC · JPL
392029	2009 BQ_{32}	—	January 16, 2009	Kitt Peak	Spacewatch	·	1.5 km	MPC · JPL
392030	2009 BS_{32}	—	January 16, 2009	Kitt Peak	Spacewatch	KOR	1.2 km	MPC · JPL
392031	2009 BL_{35}	—	January 16, 2009	Kitt Peak	Spacewatch	·	1.8 km	MPC · JPL
392032	2009 BG_{41}	—	January 16, 2009	Kitt Peak	Spacewatch	·	1.3 km	MPC · JPL
392033	2009 BJ_{41}	—	January 16, 2009	Kitt Peak	Spacewatch	·	3.1 km	MPC · JPL
392034	2009 BW_{49}	—	March 29, 2004	Kitt Peak	Spacewatch	·	2.9 km	MPC · JPL
392035	2009 BV_{54}	—	September 14, 2007	Mount Lemmon	Mount Lemmon Survey	·	1.6 km	MPC · JPL
392036	2009 BE_{55}	—	January 16, 2009	Mount Lemmon	Mount Lemmon Survey	·	1.9 km	MPC · JPL
392037	2009 BP_{67}	—	January 20, 2009	Kitt Peak	Spacewatch	·	1.8 km	MPC · JPL
392038	2009 BH_{72}	—	October 8, 2007	Catalina	CSS	·	2.5 km	MPC · JPL
392039	2009 BP_{76}	—	January 27, 2009	Purple Mountain	PMO NEO Survey Program	·	2.7 km	MPC · JPL
392040	2009 BZ_{86}	—	January 25, 2009	Kitt Peak	Spacewatch	·	2.2 km	MPC · JPL
392041	2009 BN_{87}	—	January 25, 2009	Kitt Peak	Spacewatch	·	1.6 km	MPC · JPL
392042	2009 BL_{91}	—	January 25, 2009	Kitt Peak	Spacewatch	·	1.9 km	MPC · JPL
392043	2009 BY_{92}	—	December 21, 2003	Kitt Peak	Spacewatch	·	2.0 km	MPC · JPL
392044	2009 BO_{96}	—	January 24, 2009	Purple Mountain	PMO NEO Survey Program	·	2.1 km	MPC · JPL
392045	2009 BB_{108}	—	January 29, 2009	Mount Lemmon	Mount Lemmon Survey	·	1.8 km	MPC · JPL
392046	2009 BF_{110}	—	January 31, 2009	Mount Lemmon	Mount Lemmon Survey	·	2.2 km	MPC · JPL
392047	2009 BT_{110}	—	January 31, 2009	Mount Lemmon	Mount Lemmon Survey	AGN	1.2 km	MPC · JPL
392048	2009 BU_{116}	—	January 29, 2009	Mount Lemmon	Mount Lemmon Survey	·	2.1 km	MPC · JPL
392049	2009 BB_{118}	—	January 30, 2009	Kitt Peak	Spacewatch	·	1.6 km	MPC · JPL
392050	2009 BE_{120}	—	January 31, 2009	Kitt Peak	Spacewatch	·	2.1 km	MPC · JPL
392051	2009 BZ_{129}	—	April 2, 2005	Mount Lemmon	Mount Lemmon Survey	AGN	1.5 km	MPC · JPL
392052	2009 BG_{138}	—	January 29, 2009	Kitt Peak	Spacewatch	·	2.2 km	MPC · JPL
392053	2009 BC_{142}	—	January 30, 2009	Kitt Peak	Spacewatch	NEM	2.1 km	MPC · JPL
392054	2009 BC_{167}	—	January 31, 2009	Kitt Peak	Spacewatch	·	1.8 km	MPC · JPL
392055	2009 BQ_{170}	—	January 16, 2009	Kitt Peak	Spacewatch	KOR	1.2 km	MPC · JPL
392056	2009 BO_{172}	—	January 18, 2009	Mount Lemmon	Mount Lemmon Survey	·	1.2 km	MPC · JPL
392057	2009 BT_{177}	—	January 31, 2009	Kitt Peak	Spacewatch	EOS	1.8 km	MPC · JPL
392058	2009 BS_{178}	—	January 25, 2009	Kitt Peak	Spacewatch	·	2.4 km	MPC · JPL
392059	2009 BP_{182}	—	January 18, 2009	Kitt Peak	Spacewatch	·	1.9 km	MPC · JPL
392060	2009 BP_{183}	—	January 17, 2009	Kitt Peak	Spacewatch	·	2.1 km	MPC · JPL
392061	2009 BF_{185}	—	March 10, 2005	Catalina	CSS	·	1.9 km	MPC · JPL
392062	2009 BH_{186}	—	January 17, 2009	Kitt Peak	Spacewatch	·	2.3 km	MPC · JPL
392063	2009 BR_{189}	—	January 29, 2009	Catalina	CSS	·	2.0 km	MPC · JPL
392064	2009 CB_{26}	—	February 1, 2009	Kitt Peak	Spacewatch	·	1.9 km	MPC · JPL
392065	2009 CC_{34}	—	February 2, 2009	Mount Lemmon	Mount Lemmon Survey	·	3.1 km	MPC · JPL
392066	2009 CB_{36}	—	December 1, 2008	Mount Lemmon	Mount Lemmon Survey	·	1.7 km	MPC · JPL
392067	2009 CL_{37}	—	February 4, 2009	Mount Lemmon	Mount Lemmon Survey	·	2.0 km	MPC · JPL
392068	2009 CO_{40}	—	February 13, 2009	Kitt Peak	Spacewatch	·	1.9 km	MPC · JPL
392069	2009 CO_{41}	—	February 13, 2009	Kitt Peak	Spacewatch	·	1.7 km	MPC · JPL
392070 Siurell	2009 CB_{55}	Siurell	February 14, 2009	La Sagra	OAM	·	1.8 km	MPC · JPL
392071	2009 CP_{56}	—	November 5, 2007	Kitt Peak	Spacewatch	·	1.7 km	MPC · JPL
392072	2009 CR_{64}	—	February 4, 2009	Mount Lemmon	Mount Lemmon Survey	·	3.1 km	MPC · JPL
392073	2009 DP_{6}	—	February 17, 2009	Kitt Peak	Spacewatch	NEM	1.9 km	MPC · JPL
392074	2009 DT_{11}	—	February 17, 2009	Socorro	LINEAR	·	2.5 km	MPC · JPL
392075	2009 DQ_{15}	—	January 19, 2009	Mount Lemmon	Mount Lemmon Survey	(13314)	2.0 km	MPC · JPL
392076	2009 DO_{18}	—	January 25, 2009	Kitt Peak	Spacewatch	·	2.4 km	MPC · JPL
392077	2009 DS_{26}	—	February 22, 2009	Calar Alto	F. Hormuth	·	1.4 km	MPC · JPL
392078	2009 DC_{32}	—	February 20, 2009	Kitt Peak	Spacewatch	·	2.1 km	MPC · JPL
392079	2009 DC_{34}	—	February 20, 2009	Kitt Peak	Spacewatch	TRE	4.1 km	MPC · JPL
392080	2009 DV_{34}	—	February 20, 2009	Kitt Peak	Spacewatch	·	2.5 km	MPC · JPL
392081	2009 DL_{36}	—	January 29, 2009	Catalina	CSS	·	2.1 km	MPC · JPL
392082	2009 DJ_{45}	—	February 26, 2009	Socorro	LINEAR	DOR	3.0 km	MPC · JPL
392083	2009 DN_{56}	—	February 22, 2009	Kitt Peak	Spacewatch	·	3.7 km	MPC · JPL
392084	2009 DY_{59}	—	February 22, 2009	Kitt Peak	Spacewatch	·	2.3 km	MPC · JPL
392085	2009 DW_{64}	—	January 30, 2009	Mount Lemmon	Mount Lemmon Survey	·	2.1 km	MPC · JPL
392086	2009 DB_{65}	—	February 20, 2009	Kitt Peak	Spacewatch	·	4.0 km	MPC · JPL
392087	2009 DC_{73}	—	February 3, 2009	Mount Lemmon	Mount Lemmon Survey	GEF	1.4 km	MPC · JPL
392088	2009 DL_{77}	—	February 22, 2009	Mount Lemmon	Mount Lemmon Survey	MRX	1.1 km	MPC · JPL
392089	2009 DV_{85}	—	February 27, 2009	Kitt Peak	Spacewatch	·	1.8 km	MPC · JPL
392090	2009 DR_{98}	—	February 26, 2009	Kitt Peak	Spacewatch	AGN	1.2 km	MPC · JPL
392091	2009 DW_{100}	—	October 1, 2000	Socorro	LINEAR	·	3.9 km	MPC · JPL
392092	2009 DG_{102}	—	February 26, 2009	Kitt Peak	Spacewatch	BRA	1.8 km	MPC · JPL
392093	2009 DU_{107}	—	February 24, 2009	Mount Lemmon	Mount Lemmon Survey	DOR	2.5 km	MPC · JPL
392094	2009 DU_{109}	—	February 19, 2009	Catalina	CSS	·	2.4 km	MPC · JPL
392095	2009 DK_{117}	—	February 27, 2009	Kitt Peak	Spacewatch	·	2.0 km	MPC · JPL
392096	2009 DT_{122}	—	February 27, 2009	Kitt Peak	Spacewatch	·	2.0 km	MPC · JPL
392097	2009 DZ_{126}	—	February 20, 2009	Kitt Peak	Spacewatch	AGN	1.3 km	MPC · JPL
392098	2009 DA_{130}	—	February 27, 2009	Kitt Peak	Spacewatch	·	2.4 km	MPC · JPL
392099	2009 DH_{130}	—	February 28, 2009	Kitt Peak	Spacewatch	HOF	2.7 km	MPC · JPL
392100	2009 DW_{131}	—	February 20, 2009	Kitt Peak	Spacewatch	·	1.8 km	MPC · JPL

== 392101–392200 ==
back to top

Designation			Discovery			Properties		Ref
Permanent	Provisional	Named after	Date	Site	Discoverer(s)	Category	Diam.	Ref
392101	2009 DQ_{133}	—	February 27, 2009	Mount Lemmon	Mount Lemmon Survey	GEF	1.3 km	MPC · JPL
392102	2009 DR_{138}	—	February 20, 2009	Kitt Peak	Spacewatch	·	3.4 km	MPC · JPL
392103	2009 DF_{139}	—	February 27, 2009	Kitt Peak	Spacewatch	EOS	1.9 km	MPC · JPL
392104	2009 DG_{140}	—	February 19, 2009	Catalina	CSS	H	460 m	MPC · JPL
392105	2009 DD_{142}	—	February 22, 2009	Kitt Peak	Spacewatch	EMA	2.9 km	MPC · JPL
392106	2009 EA_{4}	—	March 15, 2009	La Sagra	OAM	·	2.2 km	MPC · JPL
392107	2009 EX_{10}	—	March 2, 2009	Kitt Peak	Spacewatch	·	2.4 km	MPC · JPL
392108	2009 EY_{19}	—	December 30, 2008	Mount Lemmon	Mount Lemmon Survey	·	3.3 km	MPC · JPL
392109	2009 EN_{20}	—	March 15, 2009	La Sagra	OAM	KOR	1.8 km	MPC · JPL
392110	2009 EK_{21}	—	March 3, 2009	Catalina	CSS	H	590 m	MPC · JPL
392111	2009 EU_{24}	—	March 3, 2009	Kitt Peak	Spacewatch	·	2.2 km	MPC · JPL
392112	2009 EV_{25}	—	January 31, 2009	Mount Lemmon	Mount Lemmon Survey	·	2.0 km	MPC · JPL
392113	2009 EX_{27}	—	March 2, 2009	Kitt Peak	Spacewatch	TIR ·	2.9 km	MPC · JPL
392114	2009 FP_{7}	—	March 16, 2009	Kitt Peak	Spacewatch	·	2.1 km	MPC · JPL
392115	2009 FL_{17}	—	March 17, 2009	Catalina	CSS	H	480 m	MPC · JPL
392116	2009 FW_{17}	—	March 18, 2009	La Sagra	OAM	DOR	2.6 km	MPC · JPL
392117	2009 FA_{18}	—	February 11, 2004	Kitt Peak	Spacewatch	·	2.4 km	MPC · JPL
392118	2009 FZ_{20}	—	March 19, 2009	Kitt Peak	Spacewatch	·	1.6 km	MPC · JPL
392119	2009 FZ_{27}	—	March 22, 2009	Catalina	CSS	·	3.4 km	MPC · JPL
392120 Heidiursula	2009 FK_{30}	Heidiursula	March 18, 2009	Zadko	Todd, M.	H	470 m	MPC · JPL
392121	2009 FU_{31}	—	March 23, 2004	Kitt Peak	Spacewatch	·	2.0 km	MPC · JPL
392122	2009 FE_{38}	—	March 26, 2009	Kitt Peak	Spacewatch	fast	2.1 km	MPC · JPL
392123	2009 FO_{40}	—	March 16, 2009	Purple Mountain	PMO NEO Survey Program	·	3.1 km	MPC · JPL
392124	2009 FT_{40}	—	March 18, 2009	Mount Lemmon	Mount Lemmon Survey	·	2.3 km	MPC · JPL
392125	2009 FX_{46}	—	March 27, 2009	Kitt Peak	Spacewatch	EOS	1.7 km	MPC · JPL
392126	2009 FG_{49}	—	February 17, 2004	Kitt Peak	Spacewatch	BRA	1.6 km	MPC · JPL
392127	2009 FY_{55}	—	March 18, 2009	Catalina	CSS	H	750 m	MPC · JPL
392128	2009 FM_{60}	—	March 18, 2009	Mount Lemmon	Mount Lemmon Survey	KOR	1.2 km	MPC · JPL
392129	2009 FR_{63}	—	March 29, 2009	Kitt Peak	Spacewatch	·	2.5 km	MPC · JPL
392130	2009 FD_{69}	—	March 16, 2009	Kitt Peak	Spacewatch	·	4.0 km	MPC · JPL
392131	2009 FG_{69}	—	March 16, 2009	Kitt Peak	Spacewatch	·	3.1 km	MPC · JPL
392132	2009 FO_{71}	—	March 30, 2009	Mount Lemmon	Mount Lemmon Survey	·	4.1 km	MPC · JPL
392133	2009 FZ_{71}	—	March 17, 2009	Kitt Peak	Spacewatch	·	3.1 km	MPC · JPL
392134	2009 FR_{75}	—	September 26, 2006	Mount Lemmon	Mount Lemmon Survey	·	2.9 km	MPC · JPL
392135	2009 GH_{4}	—	January 19, 2008	Mount Lemmon	Mount Lemmon Survey	·	3.7 km	MPC · JPL
392136	2009 GJ_{6}	—	April 1, 2009	Mount Lemmon	Mount Lemmon Survey	THM	2.4 km	MPC · JPL
392137	2009 HW	—	April 16, 2009	Catalina	CSS	·	2.8 km	MPC · JPL
392138	2009 HY_{1}	—	March 29, 2009	Kitt Peak	Spacewatch	·	1.9 km	MPC · JPL
392139	2009 HX_{5}	—	April 17, 2009	Catalina	CSS	H	590 m	MPC · JPL
392140	2009 HD_{11}	—	April 18, 2009	Mount Lemmon	Mount Lemmon Survey	EOS	1.7 km	MPC · JPL
392141	2009 HW_{15}	—	January 19, 2009	Mount Lemmon	Mount Lemmon Survey	·	3.5 km	MPC · JPL
392142 Solheim	2009 HV_{19}	Solheim	April 16, 2009	Baldone	K. Černis, I. Eglītis	·	2.8 km	MPC · JPL
392143	2009 HV_{26}	—	April 18, 2009	Kitt Peak	Spacewatch	THM	2.5 km	MPC · JPL
392144	2009 HN_{32}	—	January 30, 2008	Mount Lemmon	Mount Lemmon Survey	HYG	2.6 km	MPC · JPL
392145	2009 HN_{37}	—	February 24, 2009	Mount Lemmon	Mount Lemmon Survey	H	640 m	MPC · JPL
392146	2009 HB_{39}	—	April 18, 2009	Kitt Peak	Spacewatch	EOS	1.9 km	MPC · JPL
392147	2009 HC_{39}	—	April 18, 2009	Kitt Peak	Spacewatch	·	2.0 km	MPC · JPL
392148	2009 HF_{39}	—	April 18, 2009	Kitt Peak	Spacewatch	·	2.5 km	MPC · JPL
392149	2009 HQ_{40}	—	April 20, 2009	Kitt Peak	Spacewatch	·	3.2 km	MPC · JPL
392150	2009 HO_{49}	—	April 21, 2009	Kitt Peak	Spacewatch	·	1.6 km	MPC · JPL
392151	2009 HJ_{51}	—	April 21, 2009	Kitt Peak	Spacewatch	·	2.0 km	MPC · JPL
392152	2009 HO_{65}	—	April 23, 2009	Kitt Peak	Spacewatch	·	2.9 km	MPC · JPL
392153	2009 HQ_{65}	—	April 18, 2009	Kitt Peak	Spacewatch	·	3.2 km	MPC · JPL
392154	2009 HG_{67}	—	April 26, 2009	Mount Lemmon	Mount Lemmon Survey	·	3.7 km	MPC · JPL
392155	2009 HH_{69}	—	March 21, 2009	Kitt Peak	Spacewatch	·	2.0 km	MPC · JPL
392156	2009 HJ_{83}	—	March 24, 2009	Mount Lemmon	Mount Lemmon Survey	EOS	2.0 km	MPC · JPL
392157	2009 HB_{84}	—	March 1, 2009	Mount Lemmon	Mount Lemmon Survey	·	3.9 km	MPC · JPL
392158	2009 HV_{93}	—	April 30, 2009	Kitt Peak	Spacewatch	H	570 m	MPC · JPL
392159	2009 HE_{96}	—	April 17, 2009	Kitt Peak	Spacewatch	·	2.9 km	MPC · JPL
392160	2009 HK_{99}	—	April 20, 2009	Mount Lemmon	Mount Lemmon Survey	·	1.9 km	MPC · JPL
392161	2009 HM_{99}	—	April 21, 2009	Kitt Peak	Spacewatch	EOS	2.1 km	MPC · JPL
392162	2009 HX_{100}	—	April 29, 2009	Kitt Peak	Spacewatch	·	2.2 km	MPC · JPL
392163	2009 HL_{104}	—	April 27, 2009	Kitt Peak	Spacewatch	·	1.3 km	MPC · JPL
392164	2009 JT_{1}	—	May 6, 2009	La Sagra	OAM	·	4.8 km	MPC · JPL
392165	2009 JH_{3}	—	April 18, 2009	Kitt Peak	Spacewatch	·	3.4 km	MPC · JPL
392166	2009 JS_{4}	—	May 13, 2009	Kitt Peak	Spacewatch	H	420 m	MPC · JPL
392167	2009 JC_{7}	—	May 13, 2009	Mount Lemmon	Mount Lemmon Survey	·	3.0 km	MPC · JPL
392168	2009 JV_{9}	—	March 24, 2009	Mount Lemmon	Mount Lemmon Survey	NAE	2.4 km	MPC · JPL
392169	2009 JO_{16}	—	May 15, 2009	Kitt Peak	Spacewatch	·	2.0 km	MPC · JPL
392170	2009 JZ_{17}	—	May 1, 2009	Kitt Peak	Spacewatch	EMA	4.0 km	MPC · JPL
392171	2009 KG_{1}	—	May 17, 2009	Dauban	Kugel, F.	·	3.4 km	MPC · JPL
392172	2009 KP_{2}	—	April 20, 2009	Kitt Peak	Spacewatch	·	3.1 km	MPC · JPL
392173	2009 KP_{6}	—	May 25, 2009	Mount Lemmon	Mount Lemmon Survey	·	3.5 km	MPC · JPL
392174	2009 KM_{9}	—	April 30, 2009	Kitt Peak	Spacewatch	EOS	2.0 km	MPC · JPL
392175	2009 KZ_{13}	—	May 26, 2009	Kitt Peak	Spacewatch	·	4.6 km	MPC · JPL
392176	2009 KK_{14}	—	April 17, 2009	Mount Lemmon	Mount Lemmon Survey	·	4.6 km	MPC · JPL
392177	2009 KM_{19}	—	May 28, 2009	Kitt Peak	Spacewatch	URS	5.1 km	MPC · JPL
392178	2009 KN_{19}	—	May 28, 2009	Kitt Peak	Spacewatch	·	4.7 km	MPC · JPL
392179	2009 LZ_{2}	—	June 12, 2009	Kitt Peak	Spacewatch	·	2.0 km	MPC · JPL
392180	2009 LO_{6}	—	June 1, 2009	Catalina	CSS	H	500 m	MPC · JPL
392181	2009 LZ_{6}	—	June 1, 2009	Mount Lemmon	Mount Lemmon Survey	·	3.3 km	MPC · JPL
392182	2009 MG	—	June 17, 2009	Skylive	Tozzi, F.	·	3.2 km	MPC · JPL
392183	2009 PA	—	August 1, 2009	Siding Spring	SSS	·	4.8 km	MPC · JPL
392184	2009 QN_{6}	—	October 19, 1998	Kitt Peak	Spacewatch	MAS	640 m	MPC · JPL
392185	2009 QR_{12}	—	February 9, 2008	Catalina	CSS	H	670 m	MPC · JPL
392186	2009 QR_{21}	—	April 8, 2008	Catalina	CSS	T_{j} (2.97)	3.7 km	MPC · JPL
392187	2009 QJ_{32}	—	August 20, 2009	Kitt Peak	Spacewatch	·	840 m	MPC · JPL
392188	2009 RV_{68}	—	September 15, 2009	Kitt Peak	Spacewatch	L4	7.9 km	MPC · JPL
392189	2009 SR_{30}	—	September 16, 2009	Kitt Peak	Spacewatch	L4 · 006	10 km	MPC · JPL
392190	2009 SQ_{52}	—	September 17, 2009	Kitt Peak	Spacewatch	·	610 m	MPC · JPL
392191	2009 SF_{58}	—	September 17, 2009	Kitt Peak	Spacewatch	·	980 m	MPC · JPL
392192	2009 SP_{76}	—	September 17, 2009	Kitt Peak	Spacewatch	L4	8.1 km	MPC · JPL
392193	2009 SQ_{121}	—	September 18, 2009	Kitt Peak	Spacewatch	L4	9.3 km	MPC · JPL
392194	2009 SR_{133}	—	September 18, 2009	Kitt Peak	Spacewatch	·	690 m	MPC · JPL
392195	2009 SD_{140}	—	September 15, 2009	Kitt Peak	Spacewatch	L4	8.3 km	MPC · JPL
392196	2009 SU_{143}	—	September 15, 2009	Kitt Peak	Spacewatch	L4	8.9 km	MPC · JPL
392197	2009 SQ_{163}	—	September 21, 2009	Kitt Peak	Spacewatch	L4	10 km	MPC · JPL
392198	2009 ST_{245}	—	September 26, 2008	Mount Lemmon	Mount Lemmon Survey	L4	9.8 km	MPC · JPL
392199	2009 SH_{248}	—	September 23, 2009	Kitt Peak	Spacewatch	L4	9.4 km	MPC · JPL
392200	2009 SE_{252}	—	September 16, 2009	Kitt Peak	Spacewatch	L4	7.3 km	MPC · JPL

== 392201–392300 ==
back to top

Designation			Discovery			Properties		Ref
Permanent	Provisional	Named after	Date	Site	Discoverer(s)	Category	Diam.	Ref
392201	2009 SL_{257}	—	September 21, 2009	Mount Lemmon	Mount Lemmon Survey	L4	7.9 km	MPC · JPL
392202	2009 SV_{262}	—	September 23, 2009	Mount Lemmon	Mount Lemmon Survey	L4	7.3 km	MPC · JPL
392203	2009 SZ_{292}	—	September 26, 2009	Kitt Peak	Spacewatch	HIL · 3:2 · (6124)	6.8 km	MPC · JPL
392204	2009 SR_{296}	—	September 15, 2009	Kitt Peak	Spacewatch	L4	8.9 km	MPC · JPL
392205	2009 SZ_{299}	—	September 17, 2009	Kitt Peak	Spacewatch	L4	9.5 km	MPC · JPL
392206	2009 SR_{301}	—	September 16, 2009	Kitt Peak	Spacewatch	L4 · ERY	7.2 km	MPC · JPL
392207	2009 SB_{311}	—	February 14, 2002	Kitt Peak	Spacewatch	L4	9.8 km	MPC · JPL
392208	2009 SQ_{321}	—	September 21, 2009	Kitt Peak	Spacewatch	L4	7.4 km	MPC · JPL
392209	2009 SV_{346}	—	September 25, 2009	Kitt Peak	Spacewatch	L4	7.8 km	MPC · JPL
392210	2009 SE_{354}	—	September 18, 2009	Kitt Peak	Spacewatch	L4	7.4 km	MPC · JPL
392211	2009 TG_{10}	—	October 15, 2009	Mount Lemmon	Mount Lemmon Survey	AMO +1km	1.1 km	MPC · JPL
392212	2009 TS_{41}	—	October 23, 2006	Mount Lemmon	Mount Lemmon Survey	·	800 m	MPC · JPL
392213	2009 UQ_{12}	—	October 20, 2006	Mount Lemmon	Mount Lemmon Survey	·	640 m	MPC · JPL
392214	2009 UC_{20}	—	October 24, 2009	Hibiscus	Teamo, N.	·	990 m	MPC · JPL
392215	2009 UO_{25}	—	October 18, 2009	Mount Lemmon	Mount Lemmon Survey	·	640 m	MPC · JPL
392216	2009 UX_{28}	—	October 18, 2009	Mount Lemmon	Mount Lemmon Survey	L4	9.9 km	MPC · JPL
392217	2009 UJ_{45}	—	October 18, 2009	Mount Lemmon	Mount Lemmon Survey	L4	9.5 km	MPC · JPL
392218	2009 UT_{73}	—	October 18, 2009	Catalina	CSS	·	710 m	MPC · JPL
392219	2009 UV_{79}	—	September 24, 2008	Mount Lemmon	Mount Lemmon Survey	L4	7.9 km	MPC · JPL
392220	2009 UP_{82}	—	October 7, 2008	Mount Lemmon	Mount Lemmon Survey	L4	9.7 km	MPC · JPL
392221	2009 UG_{95}	—	September 15, 2009	Kitt Peak	Spacewatch	L4	8.9 km	MPC · JPL
392222	2009 UA_{99}	—	October 23, 2009	Mount Lemmon	Mount Lemmon Survey	L4	9.5 km	MPC · JPL
392223	2009 UH_{102}	—	October 24, 2009	Mount Lemmon	Mount Lemmon Survey	L4	7.0 km	MPC · JPL
392224	2009 US_{106}	—	October 7, 2008	Mount Lemmon	Mount Lemmon Survey	L4	12 km	MPC · JPL
392225 Lanzarote	2009 UN_{128}	Lanzarote	October 29, 2009	Nazaret	Muler, G., Ruiz, J. M.	·	750 m	MPC · JPL
392226	2009 UB_{141}	—	November 1, 1997	Kitt Peak	Spacewatch	L4	10 km	MPC · JPL
392227	2009 VK_{8}	—	November 8, 2009	Mount Lemmon	Mount Lemmon Survey	L4 · ERY	6.7 km	MPC · JPL
392228	2009 VH_{25}	—	September 21, 2009	Mount Lemmon	Mount Lemmon Survey	·	810 m	MPC · JPL
392229	2009 VM_{41}	—	November 9, 2009	Mount Lemmon	Mount Lemmon Survey	·	1.4 km	MPC · JPL
392230	2009 VG_{44}	—	November 13, 2009	La Sagra	OAM	ERI	2.1 km	MPC · JPL
392231	2009 VU_{45}	—	September 22, 2009	Mount Lemmon	Mount Lemmon Survey	·	630 m	MPC · JPL
392232	2009 VJ_{51}	—	February 25, 2007	Mount Lemmon	Mount Lemmon Survey	·	1.1 km	MPC · JPL
392233	2009 VF_{74}	—	October 6, 1996	Kitt Peak	Spacewatch	·	580 m	MPC · JPL
392234	2009 VN_{76}	—	November 15, 2009	Catalina	CSS	·	1.3 km	MPC · JPL
392235	2009 VG_{80}	—	August 17, 2009	Catalina	CSS	·	1.4 km	MPC · JPL
392236	2009 VN_{98}	—	January 26, 2006	Mount Lemmon	Mount Lemmon Survey	·	1.9 km	MPC · JPL
392237	2009 VW_{114}	—	November 9, 2009	Mount Lemmon	Mount Lemmon Survey	·	600 m	MPC · JPL
392238	2009 WC_{2}	—	September 26, 2009	Kitt Peak	Spacewatch	L4	7.7 km	MPC · JPL
392239	2009 WP_{12}	—	November 16, 2009	Mount Lemmon	Mount Lemmon Survey	L4 · (8060)	7.7 km	MPC · JPL
392240	2009 WZ_{20}	—	November 17, 2009	Mount Lemmon	Mount Lemmon Survey	·	1.3 km	MPC · JPL
392241	2009 WV_{30}	—	November 16, 2009	Kitt Peak	Spacewatch	·	830 m	MPC · JPL
392242	2009 WP_{36}	—	November 17, 2009	Kitt Peak	Spacewatch	L4	7.7 km	MPC · JPL
392243	2009 WP_{68}	—	November 17, 2009	Mount Lemmon	Mount Lemmon Survey	·	1.3 km	MPC · JPL
392244	2009 WS_{77}	—	November 18, 2009	Kitt Peak	Spacewatch	·	880 m	MPC · JPL
392245	2009 WU_{87}	—	December 24, 2006	Kitt Peak	Spacewatch	·	710 m	MPC · JPL
392246	2009 WW_{122}	—	October 8, 2008	Kitt Peak	Spacewatch	L4	7.9 km	MPC · JPL
392247	2009 WA_{123}	—	November 20, 2009	Kitt Peak	Spacewatch	·	490 m	MPC · JPL
392248	2009 WZ_{134}	—	November 22, 2009	Mount Lemmon	Mount Lemmon Survey	·	570 m	MPC · JPL
392249	2009 WS_{163}	—	November 21, 2009	Kitt Peak	Spacewatch	·	670 m	MPC · JPL
392250	2009 WR_{168}	—	November 22, 2009	Kitt Peak	Spacewatch	NYS	1.0 km	MPC · JPL
392251	2009 WS_{173}	—	November 22, 2009	Mount Lemmon	Mount Lemmon Survey	·	550 m	MPC · JPL
392252	2009 WC_{203}	—	November 8, 2009	Kitt Peak	Spacewatch	·	810 m	MPC · JPL
392253	2009 WB_{206}	—	January 27, 2007	Mount Lemmon	Mount Lemmon Survey	·	1.7 km	MPC · JPL
392254	2009 WY_{227}	—	January 10, 2007	Kitt Peak	Spacewatch	·	690 m	MPC · JPL
392255	2009 WR_{233}	—	September 15, 2009	Kitt Peak	Spacewatch	·	830 m	MPC · JPL
392256	2009 WF_{262}	—	November 18, 2009	Mount Lemmon	Mount Lemmon Survey	·	950 m	MPC · JPL
392257	2009 WQ_{263}	—	November 21, 2009	Mount Lemmon	Mount Lemmon Survey	·	870 m	MPC · JPL
392258	2009 XO_{19}	—	December 15, 2009	Mount Lemmon	Mount Lemmon Survey	·	960 m	MPC · JPL
392259	2009 YD_{16}	—	December 19, 2009	Mount Lemmon	Mount Lemmon Survey	·	1.4 km	MPC · JPL
392260	2009 YU_{17}	—	December 21, 2009	Hibiscus	Teamo, N.	·	830 m	MPC · JPL
392261	2009 YF_{22}	—	December 17, 2009	Mount Lemmon	Mount Lemmon Survey	·	2.3 km	MPC · JPL
392262	2009 YU_{24}	—	December 19, 2009	Kitt Peak	Spacewatch	NYS	940 m	MPC · JPL
392263	2009 YV_{24}	—	September 25, 2008	Mount Lemmon	Mount Lemmon Survey	V	750 m	MPC · JPL
392264	2010 AS	—	January 4, 2010	Kitt Peak	Spacewatch	V	590 m	MPC · JPL
392265	2010 AM_{1}	—	January 5, 2010	Kitt Peak	Spacewatch	·	820 m	MPC · JPL
392266	2010 AB_{13}	—	November 22, 2009	Kitt Peak	Spacewatch	·	750 m	MPC · JPL
392267	2010 AM_{26}	—	January 6, 2010	Kitt Peak	Spacewatch	·	1.6 km	MPC · JPL
392268	2010 AZ_{26}	—	January 6, 2010	Kitt Peak	Spacewatch	·	1.6 km	MPC · JPL
392269	2010 AW_{38}	—	January 8, 2010	Kitt Peak	Spacewatch	·	1.2 km	MPC · JPL
392270	2010 AJ_{50}	—	January 8, 2010	Kitt Peak	Spacewatch	·	1.2 km	MPC · JPL
392271	2010 AJ_{53}	—	January 8, 2010	Kitt Peak	Spacewatch	·	1.1 km	MPC · JPL
392272	2010 AH_{62}	—	December 10, 2009	Mount Lemmon	Mount Lemmon Survey	·	770 m	MPC · JPL
392273	2010 AF_{64}	—	January 10, 2010	Kitt Peak	Spacewatch	·	1.7 km	MPC · JPL
392274	2010 AH_{66}	—	April 5, 2003	Kitt Peak	Spacewatch	·	1 km	MPC · JPL
392275	2010 AY_{68}	—	January 12, 2010	Catalina	CSS	·	1.6 km	MPC · JPL
392276	2010 AV_{80}	—	January 7, 2010	Kitt Peak	Spacewatch	·	950 m	MPC · JPL
392277	2010 AM_{81}	—	March 23, 2006	Catalina	CSS	·	2.5 km	MPC · JPL
392278	2010 AJ_{89}	—	March 18, 2010	Mount Lemmon	Mount Lemmon Survey	ADE	2.2 km	MPC · JPL
392279	2010 AB_{110}	—	January 12, 2010	WISE	WISE	·	3.6 km	MPC · JPL
392280	2010 AV_{121}	—	September 24, 2008	Mount Lemmon	Mount Lemmon Survey	L4	9.5 km	MPC · JPL
392281	2010 BB_{4}	—	April 22, 2007	Catalina	CSS	V	760 m	MPC · JPL
392282	2010 BX_{29}	—	January 18, 2010	WISE	WISE	KON	2.7 km	MPC · JPL
392283	2010 BT_{62}	—	October 7, 2008	Mount Lemmon	Mount Lemmon Survey	EUP	5.8 km	MPC · JPL
392284	2010 CT_{1}	—	December 18, 2009	Mount Lemmon	Mount Lemmon Survey	·	1.3 km	MPC · JPL
392285	2010 CK_{12}	—	December 18, 2001	Socorro	LINEAR	·	1.8 km	MPC · JPL
392286	2010 CJ_{17}	—	February 11, 2010	WISE	WISE	·	2.7 km	MPC · JPL
392287	2010 CM_{18}	—	January 10, 2006	Mount Lemmon	Mount Lemmon Survey	NYS	1.2 km	MPC · JPL
392288	2010 CL_{20}	—	January 11, 2010	Kitt Peak	Spacewatch	·	1.2 km	MPC · JPL
392289	2010 CG_{31}	—	February 9, 2010	Kitt Peak	Spacewatch	MAS	820 m	MPC · JPL
392290	2010 CM_{34}	—	February 10, 2010	Kitt Peak	Spacewatch	·	1.2 km	MPC · JPL
392291	2010 CJ_{43}	—	February 13, 2010	Mount Lemmon	Mount Lemmon Survey	BAR	1.4 km	MPC · JPL
392292	2010 CQ_{43}	—	January 5, 2010	Kitt Peak	Spacewatch	·	970 m	MPC · JPL
392293	2010 CX_{60}	—	October 27, 2005	Catalina	CSS	·	830 m	MPC · JPL
392294	2010 CL_{78}	—	August 21, 2008	Kitt Peak	Spacewatch	·	1.3 km	MPC · JPL
392295	2010 CJ_{80}	—	May 2, 2003	Kitt Peak	Spacewatch	NYS	1.5 km	MPC · JPL
392296	2010 CM_{81}	—	January 5, 2006	Kitt Peak	Spacewatch	·	1.1 km	MPC · JPL
392297	2010 CB_{82}	—	February 13, 2010	Kitt Peak	Spacewatch	·	2.1 km	MPC · JPL
392298	2010 CG_{106}	—	March 17, 2005	Kitt Peak	Spacewatch	THM	2.0 km	MPC · JPL
392299	2010 CX_{114}	—	February 14, 2010	Mount Lemmon	Mount Lemmon Survey	NYS	1.1 km	MPC · JPL
392300	2010 CJ_{132}	—	February 15, 2010	WISE	WISE	KON	2.1 km	MPC · JPL

== 392301–392400 ==
back to top

Designation			Discovery			Properties		Ref
Permanent	Provisional	Named after	Date	Site	Discoverer(s)	Category	Diam.	Ref
392301	2010 CL_{143}	—	September 7, 2008	Mount Lemmon	Mount Lemmon Survey	·	1.3 km	MPC · JPL
392302	2010 CM_{157}	—	November 25, 2005	Kitt Peak	Spacewatch	·	800 m	MPC · JPL
392303	2010 CS_{166}	—	February 13, 2010	Kitt Peak	Spacewatch	·	1.4 km	MPC · JPL
392304	2010 CQ_{175}	—	February 9, 2010	Kitt Peak	Spacewatch	MAS	860 m	MPC · JPL
392305	2010 CV_{176}	—	February 10, 2010	Kitt Peak	Spacewatch	·	980 m	MPC · JPL
392306	2010 CD_{183}	—	February 15, 2010	Haleakala	Pan-STARRS 1	·	930 m	MPC · JPL
392307	2010 CD_{185}	—	February 13, 2010	Socorro	LINEAR	·	1.3 km	MPC · JPL
392308	2010 CJ_{216}	—	January 29, 2009	Mount Lemmon	Mount Lemmon Survey	·	4.4 km	MPC · JPL
392309	2010 CO_{226}	—	November 23, 2009	Mount Lemmon	Mount Lemmon Survey	L4 · ERY	8.4 km	MPC · JPL
392310	2010 DS_{6}	—	February 16, 2010	Kitt Peak	Spacewatch	·	1.1 km	MPC · JPL
392311	2010 DH_{12}	—	February 19, 2010	Pla D'Arguines	R. Ferrando	PHO	1.3 km	MPC · JPL
392312	2010 DB_{55}	—	February 21, 2010	WISE	WISE	·	4.0 km	MPC · JPL
392313	2010 DT_{64}	—	February 26, 2010	WISE	WISE	·	2.5 km	MPC · JPL
392314	2010 EU_{2}	—	December 30, 2000	Kitt Peak	Spacewatch	MAR	1.6 km	MPC · JPL
392315	2010 ES_{7}	—	March 3, 2010	WISE	WISE	·	4.0 km	MPC · JPL
392316	2010 ED_{12}	—	March 7, 2010	Guidestar	Emmerich, M., Melchert, S.	·	1.7 km	MPC · JPL
392317	2010 EP_{30}	—	February 25, 2006	Kitt Peak	Spacewatch	·	1.2 km	MPC · JPL
392318	2010 ET_{30}	—	December 20, 2009	Mount Lemmon	Mount Lemmon Survey	LIX	3.5 km	MPC · JPL
392319	2010 EB_{36}	—	March 11, 2010	La Sagra	OAM	PHO	1.1 km	MPC · JPL
392320	2010 EP_{42}	—	March 4, 2010	Catalina	CSS	·	2.3 km	MPC · JPL
392321	2010 EP_{67}	—	September 19, 2003	Campo Imperatore	CINEOS	·	2.5 km	MPC · JPL
392322	2010 ES_{68}	—	March 12, 2010	Mount Lemmon	Mount Lemmon Survey	MAS	820 m	MPC · JPL
392323	2010 EN_{76}	—	September 26, 2008	Kitt Peak	Spacewatch	·	1 km	MPC · JPL
392324	2010 EB_{77}	—	March 12, 2010	Kitt Peak	Spacewatch	NYS	1.3 km	MPC · JPL
392325	2010 ET_{80}	—	March 12, 2010	Mount Lemmon	Mount Lemmon Survey	·	1.7 km	MPC · JPL
392326	2010 EZ_{85}	—	March 13, 2010	Kitt Peak	Spacewatch	·	1.8 km	MPC · JPL
392327	2010 EF_{87}	—	January 12, 2010	Mount Lemmon	Mount Lemmon Survey	·	1.9 km	MPC · JPL
392328	2010 EQ_{87}	—	April 18, 2006	Kitt Peak	Spacewatch	·	2.5 km	MPC · JPL
392329	2010 ES_{89}	—	March 14, 2010	Kitt Peak	Spacewatch	·	1.2 km	MPC · JPL
392330	2010 ER_{93}	—	February 15, 2010	Kitt Peak	Spacewatch	·	1.2 km	MPC · JPL
392331	2010 EZ_{96}	—	March 14, 2010	Mount Lemmon	Mount Lemmon Survey	NYS	1.1 km	MPC · JPL
392332	2010 EN_{102}	—	March 15, 2010	Kitt Peak	Spacewatch	·	1.4 km	MPC · JPL
392333	2010 ET_{105}	—	March 10, 2010	Purple Mountain	PMO NEO Survey Program	·	1.1 km	MPC · JPL
392334	2010 EQ_{107}	—	March 12, 2010	Mount Lemmon	Mount Lemmon Survey	·	900 m	MPC · JPL
392335	2010 EB_{109}	—	March 14, 2010	Kitt Peak	Spacewatch	·	1.4 km	MPC · JPL
392336	2010 EP_{109}	—	February 9, 2010	Kitt Peak	Spacewatch	·	1.9 km	MPC · JPL
392337	2010 EA_{110}	—	March 4, 2010	Kitt Peak	Spacewatch	·	1.6 km	MPC · JPL
392338	2010 EY_{111}	—	March 12, 2010	Kitt Peak	Spacewatch	·	1.8 km	MPC · JPL
392339	2010 EU_{112}	—	March 13, 2010	Kitt Peak	Spacewatch	·	1.2 km	MPC · JPL
392340	2010 EQ_{122}	—	March 15, 2010	Kitt Peak	Spacewatch	·	1.5 km	MPC · JPL
392341	2010 EX_{124}	—	March 12, 2010	Catalina	CSS	RAF	1.1 km	MPC · JPL
392342	2010 EB_{126}	—	March 13, 2010	Catalina	CSS	·	3.9 km	MPC · JPL
392343	2010 EK_{133}	—	April 19, 2006	Catalina	CSS	·	1.2 km	MPC · JPL
392344	2010 ER_{134}	—	March 12, 2010	Kitt Peak	Spacewatch	·	1.6 km	MPC · JPL
392345	2010 EQ_{143}	—	March 15, 2010	Catalina	CSS	RAF	1.0 km	MPC · JPL
392346	2010 FG_{4}	—	March 16, 2010	Mount Lemmon	Mount Lemmon Survey	·	2.4 km	MPC · JPL
392347	2010 FX_{17}	—	March 18, 2010	Mount Lemmon	Mount Lemmon Survey	·	1.2 km	MPC · JPL
392348	2010 FL_{19}	—	March 18, 2010	Kitt Peak	Spacewatch	·	2.0 km	MPC · JPL
392349	2010 FE_{56}	—	March 20, 2010	Kitt Peak	Spacewatch	·	1.5 km	MPC · JPL
392350	2010 FD_{86}	—	March 26, 2010	Kitt Peak	Spacewatch	·	900 m	MPC · JPL
392351	2010 FC_{88}	—	March 20, 2010	Kitt Peak	Spacewatch	·	1.4 km	MPC · JPL
392352	2010 FX_{88}	—	March 21, 2010	Mount Lemmon	Mount Lemmon Survey	·	2.0 km	MPC · JPL
392353	2010 FQ_{89}	—	March 18, 2010	Mount Lemmon	Mount Lemmon Survey	·	1.1 km	MPC · JPL
392354	2010 GM_{25}	—	March 19, 2010	Kitt Peak	Spacewatch	·	1.7 km	MPC · JPL
392355	2010 GX_{28}	—	April 8, 2010	La Sagra	OAM	·	2.3 km	MPC · JPL
392356	2010 GN_{32}	—	April 8, 2010	Črni Vrh	Skvarč, J.	(5)	1.3 km	MPC · JPL
392357	2010 GR_{66}	—	April 9, 2010	Catalina	CSS	·	1.4 km	MPC · JPL
392358	2010 GW_{94}	—	March 9, 2003	Kitt Peak	Spacewatch	·	4.6 km	MPC · JPL
392359	2010 GN_{97}	—	March 25, 2010	Kitt Peak	Spacewatch	NEM	2.4 km	MPC · JPL
392360	2010 GU_{97}	—	March 25, 2010	Kitt Peak	Spacewatch	EUN	1.2 km	MPC · JPL
392361	2010 GY_{98}	—	April 4, 2010	Kitt Peak	Spacewatch	·	2.7 km	MPC · JPL
392362	2010 GO_{103}	—	April 6, 2010	Kitt Peak	Spacewatch	·	2.3 km	MPC · JPL
392363	2010 GF_{108}	—	April 8, 2010	Kitt Peak	Spacewatch	·	2.4 km	MPC · JPL
392364	2010 GD_{118}	—	April 10, 2010	Mount Lemmon	Mount Lemmon Survey	·	1.6 km	MPC · JPL
392365	2010 GW_{130}	—	January 13, 2002	Kitt Peak	Spacewatch	MAS	650 m	MPC · JPL
392366	2010 GA_{140}	—	April 7, 2010	Mount Lemmon	Mount Lemmon Survey	·	1.3 km	MPC · JPL
392367	2010 GA_{141}	—	March 9, 2005	Mount Lemmon	Mount Lemmon Survey	AGN	1.6 km	MPC · JPL
392368	2010 GJ_{141}	—	April 8, 2010	XuYi	PMO NEO Survey Program	·	2.9 km	MPC · JPL
392369	2010 GC_{144}	—	April 11, 2010	Kitt Peak	Spacewatch	·	4.0 km	MPC · JPL
392370	2010 GY_{157}	—	October 18, 2007	Kitt Peak	Spacewatch	·	1.6 km	MPC · JPL
392371	2010 GV_{161}	—	April 9, 2010	Mount Lemmon	Mount Lemmon Survey	EUN	1.1 km	MPC · JPL
392372	2010 HW_{23}	—	June 1, 1997	Kitt Peak	Spacewatch	·	2.4 km	MPC · JPL
392373	2010 HA_{32}	—	April 19, 2010	WISE	WISE	·	3.8 km	MPC · JPL
392374	2010 HS_{64}	—	April 26, 2010	WISE	WISE	·	4.9 km	MPC · JPL
392375	2010 HK_{78}	—	April 20, 2010	Kitt Peak	Spacewatch	HNS	1.3 km	MPC · JPL
392376	2010 HK_{91}	—	February 26, 2008	Mount Lemmon	Mount Lemmon Survey	·	4.6 km	MPC · JPL
392377	2010 HC_{104}	—	September 10, 2007	Kitt Peak	Spacewatch	·	1.5 km	MPC · JPL
392378	2010 HV_{104}	—	April 25, 2010	Mount Lemmon	Mount Lemmon Survey	·	1.4 km	MPC · JPL
392379	2010 HY_{105}	—	October 22, 2003	Kitt Peak	Spacewatch	·	1.6 km	MPC · JPL
392380	2010 JB	—	May 2, 2010	Kitt Peak	Spacewatch	·	1.5 km	MPC · JPL
392381	2010 JW_{1}	—	May 3, 2010	Kitt Peak	Spacewatch	·	1.7 km	MPC · JPL
392382	2010 JK_{2}	—	September 29, 2003	Kitt Peak	Spacewatch	·	1.1 km	MPC · JPL
392383	2010 JC_{3}	—	May 4, 2010	Nogales	Tenagra II	·	1.6 km	MPC · JPL
392384	2010 JR_{29}	—	May 3, 2010	Kitt Peak	Spacewatch	·	2.3 km	MPC · JPL
392385	2010 JZ_{33}	—	March 15, 2010	Mount Lemmon	Mount Lemmon Survey	·	1.4 km	MPC · JPL
392386	2010 JZ_{39}	—	May 5, 2010	Mount Lemmon	Mount Lemmon Survey	·	1.7 km	MPC · JPL
392387	2010 JW_{77}	—	October 1, 2003	Kitt Peak	Spacewatch	·	1.7 km	MPC · JPL
392388	2010 JC_{82}	—	April 16, 2001	Anderson Mesa	LONEOS	·	2.2 km	MPC · JPL
392389	2010 JL_{86}	—	January 12, 2010	Mount Lemmon	Mount Lemmon Survey	·	2.4 km	MPC · JPL
392390	2010 JV_{114}	—	February 16, 2010	Mount Lemmon	Mount Lemmon Survey	EUN	1.3 km	MPC · JPL
392391	2010 JQ_{116}	—	May 14, 2010	Mount Lemmon	Mount Lemmon Survey	·	1.6 km	MPC · JPL
392392	2010 JQ_{127}	—	May 13, 2010	WISE	WISE	·	2.1 km	MPC · JPL
392393	2010 JJ_{147}	—	May 6, 2010	Mount Lemmon	Mount Lemmon Survey	·	2.8 km	MPC · JPL
392394	2010 JN_{153}	—	May 9, 2010	Siding Spring	SSS	·	2.2 km	MPC · JPL
392395	2010 JE_{154}	—	October 24, 2008	Kitt Peak	Spacewatch	·	1.2 km	MPC · JPL
392396	2010 JA_{155}	—	April 9, 2010	Mount Lemmon	Mount Lemmon Survey	·	1.4 km	MPC · JPL
392397	2010 JK_{177}	—	May 25, 2003	Kitt Peak	Spacewatch	V	960 m	MPC · JPL
392398	2010 KJ_{32}	—	February 16, 2010	Catalina	CSS	·	2.1 km	MPC · JPL
392399	2010 KV_{69}	—	February 2, 2008	Mount Lemmon	Mount Lemmon Survey	EMA	3.5 km	MPC · JPL
392400	2010 KZ_{81}	—	May 26, 2010	WISE	WISE	·	2.9 km	MPC · JPL

== 392401–392500 ==
back to top

Designation			Discovery			Properties		Ref
Permanent	Provisional	Named after	Date	Site	Discoverer(s)	Category	Diam.	Ref
392401	2010 KP_{117}	—	May 19, 2010	Catalina	CSS	·	1.9 km	MPC · JPL
392402	2010 KQ_{127}	—	May 21, 2010	Mount Lemmon	Mount Lemmon Survey	HNS	1.3 km	MPC · JPL
392403	2010 LR_{15}	—	June 4, 2010	Kitt Peak	Spacewatch	·	3.8 km	MPC · JPL
392404	2010 LW_{34}	—	October 10, 2007	Mount Lemmon	Mount Lemmon Survey	·	1.8 km	MPC · JPL
392405	2010 LE_{40}	—	March 12, 2008	Kitt Peak	Spacewatch	·	3.8 km	MPC · JPL
392406	2010 LQ_{67}	—	June 6, 2010	La Sagra	OAM	·	1.7 km	MPC · JPL
392407	2010 LK_{78}	—	June 10, 2010	WISE	WISE	(1118)	3.9 km	MPC · JPL
392408	2010 LE_{86}	—	June 11, 2010	WISE	WISE	TIR	1.8 km	MPC · JPL
392409	2010 LW_{97}	—	June 13, 2010	WISE	WISE	·	3.7 km	MPC · JPL
392410	2010 LW_{110}	—	October 30, 2007	Kitt Peak	Spacewatch	·	1.5 km	MPC · JPL
392411	2010 LC_{113}	—	March 18, 2009	Kitt Peak	Spacewatch	·	2.4 km	MPC · JPL
392412	2010 LG_{127}	—	June 15, 2010	WISE	WISE	EUP	4.2 km	MPC · JPL
392413	2010 LV_{130}	—	August 9, 2004	Siding Spring	SSS	·	4.0 km	MPC · JPL
392414	2010 LU_{131}	—	June 15, 2010	WISE	WISE	·	3.2 km	MPC · JPL
392415	2010 MZ_{30}	—	October 7, 2008	Mount Lemmon	Mount Lemmon Survey	·	2.6 km	MPC · JPL
392416	2010 MF_{51}	—	March 20, 2010	Catalina	CSS	·	1.9 km	MPC · JPL
392417	2010 MW_{63}	—	June 24, 2010	WISE	WISE	·	4.1 km	MPC · JPL
392418	2010 ML_{73}	—	February 27, 2008	Mount Lemmon	Mount Lemmon Survey	·	3.7 km	MPC · JPL
392419	2010 MT_{80}	—	June 26, 2010	WISE	WISE	·	6.1 km	MPC · JPL
392420	2010 MX_{82}	—	June 27, 2010	WISE	WISE	·	3.0 km	MPC · JPL
392421	2010 MK_{86}	—	June 27, 2010	WISE	WISE	·	5.2 km	MPC · JPL
392422	2010 NB_{4}	—	September 24, 2005	Anderson Mesa	LONEOS	·	4.0 km	MPC · JPL
392423	2010 NB_{14}	—	July 5, 2010	WISE	WISE	·	5.0 km	MPC · JPL
392424	2010 NF_{81}	—	July 15, 2010	WISE	WISE	·	3.8 km	MPC · JPL
392425	2010 NG_{82}	—	April 24, 2003	Kitt Peak	Spacewatch	·	2.9 km	MPC · JPL
392426	2010 NZ_{116}	—	July 14, 2010	WISE	WISE	·	2.5 km	MPC · JPL
392427	2010 OU_{20}	—	April 19, 2009	Catalina	CSS	·	3.2 km	MPC · JPL
392428	2010 OQ_{45}	—	July 22, 2010	WISE	WISE	CYB	2.6 km	MPC · JPL
392429	2010 OJ_{51}	—	July 22, 2010	WISE	WISE	·	4.4 km	MPC · JPL
392430	2010 OG_{76}	—	July 27, 2010	WISE	WISE	PAL	2.7 km	MPC · JPL
392431	2010 OE_{107}	—	July 29, 2010	WISE	WISE	·	2.8 km	MPC · JPL
392432	2010 OM_{110}	—	July 15, 2004	Siding Spring	SSS	·	4.6 km	MPC · JPL
392433	2010 OF_{119}	—	July 31, 2010	WISE	WISE	·	3.4 km	MPC · JPL
392434	2010 QS_{5}	—	October 1, 2005	Catalina	CSS	·	3.4 km	MPC · JPL
392435	2010 RV_{56}	—	October 24, 2005	Kitt Peak	Spacewatch	·	2.5 km	MPC · JPL
392436	2010 RZ_{61}	—	September 6, 2010	Kitt Peak	Spacewatch	·	2.4 km	MPC · JPL
392437	2010 RP_{90}	—	March 28, 2008	Kitt Peak	Spacewatch	·	3.5 km	MPC · JPL
392438	2010 RQ_{96}	—	September 9, 2010	Kitt Peak	Spacewatch	·	2.3 km	MPC · JPL
392439	2010 RE_{101}	—	February 11, 2008	Mount Lemmon	Mount Lemmon Survey	TIR	3.0 km	MPC · JPL
392440 Klimavičius	2010 RH_{120}	Klimavičius	September 8, 2010	Moletai	K. Černis, Zdanavicius, J.	·	2.9 km	MPC · JPL
392441	2010 RH_{129}	—	September 15, 2010	Mount Lemmon	Mount Lemmon Survey	EOS	2.4 km	MPC · JPL
392442	2010 RW_{161}	—	September 4, 2010	Mount Lemmon	Mount Lemmon Survey	·	3.6 km	MPC · JPL
392443	2010 TY_{80}	—	April 17, 2009	Mount Lemmon	Mount Lemmon Survey	H	550 m	MPC · JPL
392444	2010 TZ_{103}	—	February 16, 2007	Catalina	CSS	T_{j} (2.99) · EUP	5.1 km	MPC · JPL
392445	2010 TF_{178}	—	May 5, 2008	Mount Lemmon	Mount Lemmon Survey	·	3.4 km	MPC · JPL
392446	2010 TV_{185}	—	September 7, 2008	Mount Lemmon	Mount Lemmon Survey	L4	9.5 km	MPC · JPL
392447	2010 UN_{11}	—	November 12, 1999	Socorro	LINEAR	THM	2.4 km	MPC · JPL
392448	2010 UF_{40}	—	September 15, 2007	Mount Lemmon	Mount Lemmon Survey	·	860 m	MPC · JPL
392449	2010 UQ_{97}	—	October 28, 2010	Mount Lemmon	Mount Lemmon Survey	L4	9.4 km	MPC · JPL
392450	2010 VX_{35}	—	February 2, 2008	Kitt Peak	Spacewatch	·	3.5 km	MPC · JPL
392451	2010 VT_{83}	—	September 19, 2009	Kitt Peak	Spacewatch	L4	8.7 km	MPC · JPL
392452	2010 VL_{91}	—	November 6, 2010	Kitt Peak	Spacewatch	L4	10 km	MPC · JPL
392453	2010 VO_{106}	—	November 5, 2010	Mount Lemmon	Mount Lemmon Survey	L4	8.6 km	MPC · JPL
392454	2010 VZ_{121}	—	September 15, 2009	Kitt Peak	Spacewatch	L4	7.7 km	MPC · JPL
392455	2010 VE_{143}	—	August 27, 2009	Kitt Peak	Spacewatch	L4	8.4 km	MPC · JPL
392456	2010 VB_{164}	—	September 17, 2009	Kitt Peak	Spacewatch	L4	8.5 km	MPC · JPL
392457	2010 VV_{171}	—	October 27, 2009	Mount Lemmon	Mount Lemmon Survey	L4	8.6 km	MPC · JPL
392458	2010 VU_{201}	—	November 14, 2010	Mount Lemmon	Mount Lemmon Survey	L4	7.6 km	MPC · JPL
392459	2010 WE_{20}	—	September 21, 2009	Kitt Peak	Spacewatch	L4	7.8 km	MPC · JPL
392460	2010 XY_{9}	—	November 8, 2010	Mount Lemmon	Mount Lemmon Survey	L4 · ERY	7.0 km	MPC · JPL
392461	2010 XT_{65}	—	September 25, 2009	Kitt Peak	Spacewatch	L4 · ERY	8.4 km	MPC · JPL
392462	2010 XB_{77}	—	November 6, 2010	Mount Lemmon	Mount Lemmon Survey	L4 · ERY	7.9 km	MPC · JPL
392463	2011 BG_{58}	—	October 23, 2009	Mount Lemmon	Mount Lemmon Survey	·	1.6 km	MPC · JPL
392464	2011 BD_{109}	—	March 13, 2007	Kitt Peak	Spacewatch	·	1.7 km	MPC · JPL
392465	2011 CT_{5}	—	June 17, 2009	Mount Lemmon	Mount Lemmon Survey	H	550 m	MPC · JPL
392466	2011 CB_{66}	—	September 30, 2006	Mount Lemmon	Mount Lemmon Survey	·	1.7 km	MPC · JPL
392467	2011 CH_{67}	—	January 24, 2011	Mount Lemmon	Mount Lemmon Survey	·	1.3 km	MPC · JPL
392468	2011 CF_{70}	—	February 5, 2011	Catalina	CSS	·	1.8 km	MPC · JPL
392469	2011 EJ_{36}	—	March 10, 2007	Kitt Peak	Spacewatch	MAS	850 m	MPC · JPL
392470	2011 EK_{68}	—	February 27, 2007	Kitt Peak	Spacewatch	·	1.6 km	MPC · JPL
392471	2011 FW_{3}	—	April 14, 2007	Kitt Peak	Spacewatch	WIT	1.1 km	MPC · JPL
392472	2011 FS_{31}	—	March 28, 2011	Kitt Peak	Spacewatch	·	690 m	MPC · JPL
392473	2011 FW_{31}	—	March 4, 2011	Mount Lemmon	Mount Lemmon Survey	·	620 m	MPC · JPL
392474	2011 FP_{47}	—	March 18, 2004	Kitt Peak	Spacewatch	·	770 m	MPC · JPL
392475	2011 FA_{145}	—	April 24, 2008	Kitt Peak	Spacewatch	·	740 m	MPC · JPL
392476	2011 GD_{3}	—	April 14, 2008	Mount Lemmon	Mount Lemmon Survey	APO	540 m	MPC · JPL
392477	2011 GA_{52}	—	March 11, 2011	Kitt Peak	Spacewatch	·	2.7 km	MPC · JPL
392478	2011 GJ_{74}	—	November 12, 1999	Socorro	LINEAR	·	2.2 km	MPC · JPL
392479	2011 HU_{11}	—	April 22, 2011	Kitt Peak	Spacewatch	·	860 m	MPC · JPL
392480	2011 HT_{14}	—	October 21, 1995	Kitt Peak	Spacewatch	·	810 m	MPC · JPL
392481	2011 HC_{22}	—	October 27, 2009	Mount Lemmon	Mount Lemmon Survey	·	690 m	MPC · JPL
392482	2011 HQ_{31}	—	March 29, 2011	Kitt Peak	Spacewatch	·	610 m	MPC · JPL
392483	2011 HX_{31}	—	October 16, 2003	Kitt Peak	Spacewatch	·	2.8 km	MPC · JPL
392484	2011 HA_{51}	—	November 3, 2008	Catalina	CSS	·	2.4 km	MPC · JPL
392485	2011 HY_{59}	—	July 30, 2008	Mount Lemmon	Mount Lemmon Survey	·	780 m	MPC · JPL
392486	2011 HE_{76}	—	March 14, 2004	Kitt Peak	Spacewatch	·	820 m	MPC · JPL
392487	2011 JK_{10}	—	February 16, 2004	Kitt Peak	Spacewatch	·	970 m	MPC · JPL
392488	2011 KN_{2}	—	November 5, 1999	Kitt Peak	Spacewatch	·	810 m	MPC · JPL
392489	2011 KM_{8}	—	February 25, 2007	Kitt Peak	Spacewatch	·	900 m	MPC · JPL
392490	2011 KH_{15}	—	January 9, 2007	Mount Lemmon	Mount Lemmon Survey	·	710 m	MPC · JPL
392491	2011 KQ_{30}	—	August 28, 2005	Kitt Peak	Spacewatch	·	730 m	MPC · JPL
392492	2011 KL_{40}	—	March 26, 2007	Mount Lemmon	Mount Lemmon Survey	·	1.1 km	MPC · JPL
392493	2011 LJ_{17}	—	June 10, 2004	Campo Imperatore	CINEOS	·	1.1 km	MPC · JPL
392494	2011 NS	—	June 27, 2011	Mount Lemmon	Mount Lemmon Survey	·	1.4 km	MPC · JPL
392495	2011 OL_{6}	—	October 11, 2004	Kitt Peak	Spacewatch	·	1.0 km	MPC · JPL
392496	2011 OW_{12}	—	December 30, 2005	Kitt Peak	Spacewatch	V	790 m	MPC · JPL
392497	2011 OK_{15}	—	September 7, 2004	Kitt Peak	Spacewatch	·	1.7 km	MPC · JPL
392498	2011 OR_{20}	—	April 16, 2004	Socorro	LINEAR	·	780 m	MPC · JPL
392499	2011 OH_{25}	—	December 28, 2005	Mount Lemmon	Mount Lemmon Survey	NYS	900 m	MPC · JPL
392500	2011 OS_{27}	—	September 29, 2008	Mount Lemmon	Mount Lemmon Survey	·	1.6 km	MPC · JPL

== 392501–392600 ==
back to top

Designation			Discovery			Properties		Ref
Permanent	Provisional	Named after	Date	Site	Discoverer(s)	Category	Diam.	Ref
392501	2011 OD_{28}	—	October 11, 2006	Kitt Peak	Spacewatch	EOS	1.8 km	MPC · JPL
392502	2011 OE_{31}	—	February 20, 2009	Kitt Peak	Spacewatch	·	2.6 km	MPC · JPL
392503	2011 OJ_{43}	—	October 9, 2004	Kitt Peak	Spacewatch	·	1.1 km	MPC · JPL
392504	2011 OW_{44}	—	February 4, 2006	Kitt Peak	Spacewatch	NYS	1.4 km	MPC · JPL
392505	2011 OX_{46}	—	October 6, 2008	Mount Lemmon	Mount Lemmon Survey	·	1.5 km	MPC · JPL
392506	2011 OJ_{51}	—	September 11, 2006	Catalina	CSS	·	3.3 km	MPC · JPL
392507	2011 PP_{4}	—	September 10, 2004	Socorro	LINEAR	·	1.0 km	MPC · JPL
392508	2011 PT_{4}	—	March 13, 2010	Mount Lemmon	Mount Lemmon Survey	·	1.6 km	MPC · JPL
392509	2011 PE_{12}	—	January 14, 2010	WISE	WISE	·	3.2 km	MPC · JPL
392510	2011 PR_{12}	—	July 3, 2011	Catalina	CSS	·	1.7 km	MPC · JPL
392511	2011 PF_{13}	—	April 20, 2007	Kitt Peak	Spacewatch	·	1.0 km	MPC · JPL
392512	2011 QM_{17}	—	August 21, 2006	Kitt Peak	Spacewatch	·	2.1 km	MPC · JPL
392513	2011 QR_{18}	—	October 1, 2003	Kitt Peak	Spacewatch	RAF	750 m	MPC · JPL
392514	2011 QX_{19}	—	November 5, 2007	Kitt Peak	Spacewatch	HOF	2.6 km	MPC · JPL
392515	2011 QM_{26}	—	May 1, 2003	Kitt Peak	Spacewatch	NYS	1.2 km	MPC · JPL
392516	2011 QG_{27}	—	October 1, 2000	Socorro	LINEAR	NYS	1.4 km	MPC · JPL
392517	2011 QM_{27}	—	May 26, 2006	Kitt Peak	Spacewatch	HNS	1.4 km	MPC · JPL
392518	2011 QB_{30}	—	October 19, 2007	Kitt Peak	Spacewatch	·	2.0 km	MPC · JPL
392519	2011 QE_{30}	—	September 13, 2007	Catalina	CSS	(194)	2.7 km	MPC · JPL
392520	2011 QW_{30}	—	July 25, 2004	Anderson Mesa	LONEOS	·	770 m	MPC · JPL
392521	2011 QH_{36}	—	February 25, 2006	Mount Lemmon	Mount Lemmon Survey	·	1.5 km	MPC · JPL
392522	2011 QM_{36}	—	March 15, 2004	Kitt Peak	Spacewatch	·	2.0 km	MPC · JPL
392523	2011 QW_{42}	—	January 25, 2006	Kitt Peak	Spacewatch	CLA	2.3 km	MPC · JPL
392524	2011 QT_{43}	—	March 11, 2010	WISE	WISE	·	5.1 km	MPC · JPL
392525	2011 QH_{49}	—	October 10, 2007	Mount Lemmon	Mount Lemmon Survey	·	1.2 km	MPC · JPL
392526	2011 QO_{55}	—	October 16, 1993	Kitt Peak	Spacewatch	·	1.0 km	MPC · JPL
392527	2011 QY_{60}	—	December 30, 2007	Mount Lemmon	Mount Lemmon Survey	·	3.3 km	MPC · JPL
392528	2011 QC_{61}	—	December 30, 2007	Kitt Peak	Spacewatch	EOS	2.1 km	MPC · JPL
392529	2011 QU_{61}	—	May 7, 2005	Kitt Peak	Spacewatch	·	2.5 km	MPC · JPL
392530	2011 QK_{65}	—	August 20, 2006	Kitt Peak	Spacewatch	EOS	2.1 km	MPC · JPL
392531	2011 QH_{66}	—	January 12, 2010	WISE	WISE	·	2.7 km	MPC · JPL
392532	2011 QW_{69}	—	January 27, 2006	Kitt Peak	Spacewatch	V	780 m	MPC · JPL
392533	2011 QK_{72}	—	May 29, 2003	Socorro	LINEAR	·	1.8 km	MPC · JPL
392534	2011 QY_{91}	—	November 2, 2007	Kitt Peak	Spacewatch	·	3.1 km	MPC · JPL
392535	2011 QZ_{92}	—	July 18, 2006	Mount Lemmon	Mount Lemmon Survey	·	1.9 km	MPC · JPL
392536	2011 QX_{94}	—	November 12, 2007	Mount Lemmon	Mount Lemmon Survey	·	1.8 km	MPC · JPL
392537	2011 QE_{95}	—	June 9, 2010	Kitt Peak	Spacewatch	T_{j} (2.99) · EUP	3.8 km	MPC · JPL
392538	2011 QA_{99}	—	November 19, 2000	Socorro	LINEAR	EUP	4.2 km	MPC · JPL
392539	2011 RO_{1}	—	December 30, 2008	Mount Lemmon	Mount Lemmon Survey	·	3.2 km	MPC · JPL
392540	2011 RG_{6}	—	September 14, 2007	Mount Lemmon	Mount Lemmon Survey	·	1.7 km	MPC · JPL
392541	2011 RP_{11}	—	February 19, 2009	Mount Lemmon	Mount Lemmon Survey	·	2.0 km	MPC · JPL
392542	2011 RY_{16}	—	October 16, 2006	Catalina	CSS	·	2.7 km	MPC · JPL
392543	2011 RZ_{17}	—	October 10, 1994	Kitt Peak	Spacewatch	·	3.2 km	MPC · JPL
392544	2011 SW_{4}	—	August 26, 2000	Socorro	LINEAR	·	980 m	MPC · JPL
392545	2011 SM_{10}	—	October 14, 2007	Kitt Peak	Spacewatch	(5)	1.4 km	MPC · JPL
392546	2011 SC_{13}	—	November 18, 2007	Kitt Peak	Spacewatch	·	2.1 km	MPC · JPL
392547	2011 SX_{18}	—	November 8, 2007	Mount Lemmon	Mount Lemmon Survey	·	2.9 km	MPC · JPL
392548	2011 SM_{27}	—	November 3, 2007	Mount Lemmon	Mount Lemmon Survey	·	2.0 km	MPC · JPL
392549	2011 SY_{32}	—	October 9, 2004	Kitt Peak	Spacewatch	·	1.1 km	MPC · JPL
392550	2011 SZ_{43}	—	April 20, 2007	Mount Lemmon	Mount Lemmon Survey	·	880 m	MPC · JPL
392551	2011 SM_{44}	—	February 12, 2008	Mount Lemmon	Mount Lemmon Survey	·	2.7 km	MPC · JPL
392552	2011 SA_{46}	—	October 3, 2006	Mount Lemmon	Mount Lemmon Survey	EOS	1.8 km	MPC · JPL
392553	2011 SO_{46}	—	September 25, 2006	Kitt Peak	Spacewatch	·	2.1 km	MPC · JPL
392554	2011 SK_{50}	—	September 21, 2011	Catalina	CSS	·	1.8 km	MPC · JPL
392555	2011 SW_{52}	—	April 27, 2006	Cerro Tololo	Deep Ecliptic Survey	MAS	750 m	MPC · JPL
392556	2011 SP_{58}	—	October 5, 2000	Kitt Peak	Spacewatch	VER	2.8 km	MPC · JPL
392557	2011 SW_{67}	—	October 4, 2004	Kitt Peak	Spacewatch	·	1.2 km	MPC · JPL
392558	2011 SO_{71}	—	May 12, 2007	Mount Lemmon	Mount Lemmon Survey	NYS	1.4 km	MPC · JPL
392559	2011 SC_{74}	—	October 6, 2007	Kitt Peak	Spacewatch	MAR	1.2 km	MPC · JPL
392560	2011 SD_{74}	—	November 19, 2007	Mount Lemmon	Mount Lemmon Survey	615	1.9 km	MPC · JPL
392561	2011 SQ_{79}	—	November 2, 2007	Mount Lemmon	Mount Lemmon Survey	·	1.5 km	MPC · JPL
392562	2011 SK_{83}	—	October 19, 2006	Catalina	CSS	·	2.5 km	MPC · JPL
392563	2011 SD_{86}	—	May 29, 2003	Socorro	LINEAR	·	2.5 km	MPC · JPL
392564	2011 SW_{91}	—	August 19, 2006	Kitt Peak	Spacewatch	·	2.0 km	MPC · JPL
392565	2011 SA_{94}	—	November 1, 2007	Kitt Peak	Spacewatch	·	1.3 km	MPC · JPL
392566	2011 ST_{103}	—	December 3, 2007	Kitt Peak	Spacewatch	·	2.2 km	MPC · JPL
392567	2011 SG_{111}	—	July 15, 2007	Siding Spring	SSS	·	1.3 km	MPC · JPL
392568	2011 SU_{115}	—	August 28, 2011	Siding Spring	SSS	·	3.6 km	MPC · JPL
392569	2011 SQ_{116}	—	October 7, 2007	Mount Lemmon	Mount Lemmon Survey	·	1.7 km	MPC · JPL
392570	2011 SN_{117}	—	September 23, 2011	Kitt Peak	Spacewatch	EOS	2.1 km	MPC · JPL
392571	2011 SG_{119}	—	October 21, 2006	Mount Lemmon	Mount Lemmon Survey	VER	2.9 km	MPC · JPL
392572	2011 SU_{119}	—	October 15, 2004	Mount Lemmon	Mount Lemmon Survey	·	1.4 km	MPC · JPL
392573	2011 SQ_{122}	—	July 22, 2006	Mount Lemmon	Mount Lemmon Survey	·	2.1 km	MPC · JPL
392574	2011 SZ_{124}	—	March 19, 2009	Kitt Peak	Spacewatch	·	2.8 km	MPC · JPL
392575	2011 SG_{128}	—	September 23, 2011	Kitt Peak	Spacewatch	EOS	1.8 km	MPC · JPL
392576	2011 SS_{130}	—	September 19, 1998	Kitt Peak	Spacewatch	·	1.4 km	MPC · JPL
392577	2011 SB_{140}	—	March 17, 2005	Mount Lemmon	Mount Lemmon Survey	·	1.5 km	MPC · JPL
392578	2011 SR_{141}	—	October 16, 2006	Kitt Peak	Spacewatch	·	2.3 km	MPC · JPL
392579	2011 SV_{144}	—	September 15, 2006	Kitt Peak	Spacewatch	AGN	1.2 km	MPC · JPL
392580	2011 SE_{146}	—	April 22, 2009	Mount Lemmon	Mount Lemmon Survey	VER	2.7 km	MPC · JPL
392581	2011 ST_{169}	—	September 21, 2011	Kitt Peak	Spacewatch	·	3.3 km	MPC · JPL
392582	2011 SL_{176}	—	February 1, 2006	Kitt Peak	Spacewatch	MAS	840 m	MPC · JPL
392583	2011 SL_{178}	—	September 28, 1997	Kitt Peak	Spacewatch	·	2.5 km	MPC · JPL
392584	2011 SZ_{180}	—	October 17, 2006	Kitt Peak	Spacewatch	·	2.1 km	MPC · JPL
392585	2011 SC_{183}	—	October 7, 2000	Kitt Peak	Spacewatch	·	4.1 km	MPC · JPL
392586	2011 SU_{188}	—	April 10, 2010	WISE	WISE	PAL	2.4 km	MPC · JPL
392587	2011 SM_{195}	—	January 30, 2006	Kitt Peak	Spacewatch	·	1.2 km	MPC · JPL
392588	2011 SC_{199}	—	November 18, 2007	Mount Lemmon	Mount Lemmon Survey	·	2.2 km	MPC · JPL
392589	2011 SG_{200}	—	March 2, 2009	Kitt Peak	Spacewatch	NAE	1.9 km	MPC · JPL
392590	2011 SH_{201}	—	October 5, 2007	Kitt Peak	Spacewatch	·	1.5 km	MPC · JPL
392591	2011 SQ_{201}	—	July 29, 2010	WISE	WISE	·	2.8 km	MPC · JPL
392592	2011 SM_{202}	—	September 13, 2007	Mount Lemmon	Mount Lemmon Survey	·	1.2 km	MPC · JPL
392593	2011 SL_{207}	—	June 26, 2007	Kitt Peak	Spacewatch	CLA	2.0 km	MPC · JPL
392594	2011 SR_{208}	—	September 23, 2005	Kitt Peak	Spacewatch	ELF	3.6 km	MPC · JPL
392595	2011 SE_{213}	—	September 21, 2011	Kitt Peak	Spacewatch	·	2.1 km	MPC · JPL
392596	2011 SV_{216}	—	September 19, 2006	Catalina	CSS	·	2.3 km	MPC · JPL
392597	2011 SP_{220}	—	August 18, 2006	Kitt Peak	Spacewatch	KOR	1.9 km	MPC · JPL
392598	2011 SH_{223}	—	April 16, 2005	Kitt Peak	Spacewatch	·	2.2 km	MPC · JPL
392599	2011 SE_{225}	—	August 29, 2005	Palomar	NEAT	·	3.1 km	MPC · JPL
392600	2011 SK_{226}	—	July 22, 2010	WISE	WISE	·	2.6 km	MPC · JPL

== 392601–392700 ==
back to top

Designation			Discovery			Properties		Ref
Permanent	Provisional	Named after	Date	Site	Discoverer(s)	Category	Diam.	Ref
392601	2011 SS_{227}	—	September 29, 2011	Mount Lemmon	Mount Lemmon Survey	·	2.2 km	MPC · JPL
392602	2011 SH_{234}	—	October 2, 2006	Mount Lemmon	Mount Lemmon Survey	EOS	1.7 km	MPC · JPL
392603	2011 SW_{234}	—	May 7, 2006	Kitt Peak	Spacewatch	(5)	1.1 km	MPC · JPL
392604	2011 SS_{242}	—	December 16, 2007	Kitt Peak	Spacewatch	KOR	1.6 km	MPC · JPL
392605	2011 SX_{245}	—	April 22, 2009	Mount Lemmon	Mount Lemmon Survey	·	3.1 km	MPC · JPL
392606	2011 SZ_{245}	—	March 14, 2005	Mount Lemmon	Mount Lemmon Survey	·	2.1 km	MPC · JPL
392607	2011 SV_{252}	—	March 29, 2009	Kitt Peak	Spacewatch	·	3.0 km	MPC · JPL
392608	2011 SF_{253}	—	October 27, 2006	Kitt Peak	Spacewatch	·	2.8 km	MPC · JPL
392609	2011 SQ_{254}	—	October 21, 2006	Mount Lemmon	Mount Lemmon Survey	·	2.5 km	MPC · JPL
392610	2011 SM_{255}	—	March 14, 2004	Kitt Peak	Spacewatch	KOR	1.2 km	MPC · JPL
392611	2011 SH_{258}	—	September 22, 2011	Kitt Peak	Spacewatch	·	2.7 km	MPC · JPL
392612	2011 TA_{7}	—	August 27, 2006	Kitt Peak	Spacewatch	·	2.2 km	MPC · JPL
392613	2011 TY_{8}	—	February 17, 2004	Socorro	LINEAR	·	2.7 km	MPC · JPL
392614	2011 TM_{10}	—	August 1, 2010	WISE	WISE	·	2.8 km	MPC · JPL
392615	2011 TU_{13}	—	September 26, 2006	Kitt Peak	Spacewatch	·	2.1 km	MPC · JPL
392616	2011 TX_{15}	—	May 24, 2006	Catalina	CSS	·	1.6 km	MPC · JPL
392617	2011 UV_{3}	—	February 10, 2008	Mount Lemmon	Mount Lemmon Survey	·	3.1 km	MPC · JPL
392618	2011 UF_{9}	—	May 25, 2003	Kitt Peak	Spacewatch	·	3.9 km	MPC · JPL
392619	2011 UM_{13}	—	November 4, 2007	Kitt Peak	Spacewatch	·	3.1 km	MPC · JPL
392620	2011 UK_{22}	—	February 9, 2008	Mount Lemmon	Mount Lemmon Survey	·	2.9 km	MPC · JPL
392621	2011 UM_{23}	—	October 1, 2005	Mount Lemmon	Mount Lemmon Survey	·	3.1 km	MPC · JPL
392622	2011 UO_{24}	—	October 12, 2005	Kitt Peak	Spacewatch	·	4.3 km	MPC · JPL
392623	2011 UF_{30}	—	October 9, 2002	Socorro	LINEAR	EUN	1.5 km	MPC · JPL
392624	2011 UG_{30}	—	September 23, 2011	Mount Lemmon	Mount Lemmon Survey	EOS	2.4 km	MPC · JPL
392625	2011 US_{35}	—	April 9, 2010	WISE	WISE	·	4.1 km	MPC · JPL
392626	2011 UB_{37}	—	October 1, 2005	Catalina	CSS	·	4.1 km	MPC · JPL
392627	2011 UQ_{38}	—	November 22, 2006	Kitt Peak	Spacewatch	·	2.9 km	MPC · JPL
392628	2011 UH_{41}	—	September 30, 2011	Kitt Peak	Spacewatch	VER	2.6 km	MPC · JPL
392629	2011 UL_{44}	—	November 16, 2006	Catalina	CSS	·	2.9 km	MPC · JPL
392630	2011 UR_{44}	—	October 19, 1995	Kitt Peak	Spacewatch	EOS	2.3 km	MPC · JPL
392631	2011 UH_{72}	—	March 13, 2005	Mount Lemmon	Mount Lemmon Survey	·	2.3 km	MPC · JPL
392632	2011 UW_{73}	—	October 11, 2005	Kitt Peak	Spacewatch	EOS	1.8 km	MPC · JPL
392633	2011 UE_{79}	—	September 17, 2010	Mount Lemmon	Mount Lemmon Survey	VER	3.1 km	MPC · JPL
392634	2011 UN_{92}	—	October 1, 2006	Kitt Peak	Spacewatch	·	2.2 km	MPC · JPL
392635	2011 UJ_{97}	—	October 25, 1995	Kitt Peak	Spacewatch	TIR	2.6 km	MPC · JPL
392636	2011 UV_{107}	—	November 19, 2006	Kitt Peak	Spacewatch	·	3.5 km	MPC · JPL
392637	2011 UO_{114}	—	October 31, 2006	Mount Lemmon	Mount Lemmon Survey	·	1.9 km	MPC · JPL
392638	2011 UT_{118}	—	September 18, 2006	Kitt Peak	Spacewatch	·	1.8 km	MPC · JPL
392639	2011 UE_{122}	—	March 9, 2008	Mount Lemmon	Mount Lemmon Survey	·	3.6 km	MPC · JPL
392640	2011 UY_{122}	—	September 22, 2011	Kitt Peak	Spacewatch	·	2.8 km	MPC · JPL
392641	2011 UL_{129}	—	March 27, 2003	Kitt Peak	Spacewatch	·	3.3 km	MPC · JPL
392642	2011 UV_{130}	—	May 19, 2010	WISE	WISE	·	4.9 km	MPC · JPL
392643	2011 UN_{135}	—	April 9, 1999	Kitt Peak	Spacewatch	·	2.4 km	MPC · JPL
392644	2011 UF_{136}	—	September 18, 2006	Kitt Peak	Spacewatch	·	2.1 km	MPC · JPL
392645	2011 UT_{136}	—	April 18, 2009	Mount Lemmon	Mount Lemmon Survey	EOS	1.8 km	MPC · JPL
392646	2011 UW_{141}	—	October 23, 2011	Mount Lemmon	Mount Lemmon Survey	·	3.2 km	MPC · JPL
392647	2011 UY_{142}	—	October 25, 2005	Kitt Peak	Spacewatch	·	3.8 km	MPC · JPL
392648	2011 UB_{144}	—	October 4, 2006	Mount Lemmon	Mount Lemmon Survey	NAE	3.3 km	MPC · JPL
392649	2011 UG_{150}	—	October 23, 2006	Kitt Peak	Spacewatch	·	2.3 km	MPC · JPL
392650	2011 UY_{158}	—	March 23, 2001	Kitt Peak	Spacewatch	·	2.7 km	MPC · JPL
392651	2011 UA_{162}	—	September 12, 2006	Siding Spring	SSS	·	3.2 km	MPC · JPL
392652	2011 UN_{183}	—	April 17, 2009	Kitt Peak	Spacewatch	TEL	1.9 km	MPC · JPL
392653	2011 UP_{184}	—	April 17, 2005	Kitt Peak	Spacewatch	·	2.1 km	MPC · JPL
392654	2011 UE_{195}	—	April 1, 2009	Kitt Peak	Spacewatch	EOS	2.0 km	MPC · JPL
392655 Fengmin	2011 UL_{205}	Fengmin	March 31, 2009	Catalina	CSS	·	2.7 km	MPC · JPL
392656	2011 UU_{206}	—	May 10, 2005	Kitt Peak	Spacewatch	GEF	1.5 km	MPC · JPL
392657	2011 UR_{225}	—	May 25, 2006	Mount Lemmon	Mount Lemmon Survey	·	1.4 km	MPC · JPL
392658	2011 US_{226}	—	September 28, 2011	Kitt Peak	Spacewatch	·	2.6 km	MPC · JPL
392659	2011 UP_{237}	—	March 31, 2008	Mount Lemmon	Mount Lemmon Survey	VER	2.6 km	MPC · JPL
392660	2011 UP_{245}	—	November 14, 2006	Kitt Peak	Spacewatch	TEL	1.6 km	MPC · JPL
392661	2011 UO_{255}	—	April 29, 2009	Kitt Peak	Spacewatch	EOS	2.4 km	MPC · JPL
392662	2011 UK_{256}	—	September 3, 2010	Mount Lemmon	Mount Lemmon Survey	CYB	3.8 km	MPC · JPL
392663	2011 UN_{268}	—	August 6, 2006	Anderson Mesa	LONEOS	EUN	1.7 km	MPC · JPL
392664	2011 UY_{283}	—	July 18, 2006	Siding Spring	SSS	·	2.3 km	MPC · JPL
392665	2011 UH_{287}	—	October 14, 2007	Mount Lemmon	Mount Lemmon Survey	·	1.3 km	MPC · JPL
392666	2011 UV_{290}	—	January 19, 2002	Kitt Peak	Spacewatch	·	3.3 km	MPC · JPL
392667	2011 UV_{296}	—	May 14, 2009	Mount Lemmon	Mount Lemmon Survey	·	3.5 km	MPC · JPL
392668	2011 UE_{302}	—	November 25, 2000	Kitt Peak	Spacewatch	·	3.7 km	MPC · JPL
392669	2011 UR_{305}	—	April 22, 2010	WISE	WISE	·	3.2 km	MPC · JPL
392670	2011 UV_{305}	—	November 9, 2007	Kitt Peak	Spacewatch	·	2.2 km	MPC · JPL
392671	2011 UN_{307}	—	February 6, 2008	Catalina	CSS	·	2.7 km	MPC · JPL
392672	2011 UA_{322}	—	April 12, 2010	WISE	WISE	·	4.1 km	MPC · JPL
392673	2011 UN_{324}	—	October 16, 2007	Mount Lemmon	Mount Lemmon Survey	·	1.7 km	MPC · JPL
392674	2011 UR_{324}	—	September 7, 2011	Kitt Peak	Spacewatch	·	2.1 km	MPC · JPL
392675	2011 UT_{339}	—	November 10, 2006	Kitt Peak	Spacewatch	EOS	2.2 km	MPC · JPL
392676	2011 UJ_{343}	—	November 19, 2006	Kitt Peak	Spacewatch	·	3.3 km	MPC · JPL
392677	2011 US_{344}	—	March 17, 2004	Kitt Peak	Spacewatch	·	2.1 km	MPC · JPL
392678	2011 UH_{348}	—	November 30, 2006	Kitt Peak	Spacewatch	·	3.7 km	MPC · JPL
392679	2011 UR_{355}	—	September 20, 2011	Kitt Peak	Spacewatch	·	2.0 km	MPC · JPL
392680	2011 US_{357}	—	November 14, 2006	Kitt Peak	Spacewatch	·	2.6 km	MPC · JPL
392681	2011 UX_{376}	—	December 12, 2006	Kitt Peak	Spacewatch	·	2.6 km	MPC · JPL
392682	2011 UC_{405}	—	August 29, 2006	Catalina	CSS	·	2.0 km	MPC · JPL
392683	2011 UP_{406}	—	October 19, 2007	Catalina	CSS	·	1.3 km	MPC · JPL
392684	2011 VP_{8}	—	October 23, 2006	Mount Lemmon	Mount Lemmon Survey	(1118)	3.9 km	MPC · JPL
392685	2011 VT_{9}	—	September 20, 2011	Mount Lemmon	Mount Lemmon Survey	·	3.4 km	MPC · JPL
392686	2011 VY_{11}	—	September 17, 2010	Catalina	CSS	EOS	2.6 km	MPC · JPL
392687	2011 VY_{22}	—	February 9, 2005	Mount Lemmon	Mount Lemmon Survey	·	1.6 km	MPC · JPL
392688	2011 WL_{4}	—	April 20, 2009	Mount Lemmon	Mount Lemmon Survey	·	3.1 km	MPC · JPL
392689	2011 WG_{37}	—	April 24, 2000	Kitt Peak	Spacewatch	·	630 m	MPC · JPL
392690	2011 WW_{42}	—	October 12, 2010	Mount Lemmon	Mount Lemmon Survey	L4	8.0 km	MPC · JPL
392691	2011 WW_{46}	—	December 23, 2006	Mount Lemmon	Mount Lemmon Survey	EOS	2.3 km	MPC · JPL
392692	2011 WK_{47}	—	May 11, 2005	Kitt Peak	Spacewatch	·	2.5 km	MPC · JPL
392693	2011 WS_{48}	—	May 15, 2009	Kitt Peak	Spacewatch	EOS	3.0 km	MPC · JPL
392694	2011 WR_{54}	—	May 20, 2010	WISE	WISE	·	6.0 km	MPC · JPL
392695	2011 WO_{56}	—	November 10, 2005	Mount Lemmon	Mount Lemmon Survey	SYL · CYB	3.9 km	MPC · JPL
392696	2011 WS_{109}	—	November 12, 2005	Kitt Peak	Spacewatch	·	2.6 km	MPC · JPL
392697	2011 WK_{115}	—	March 12, 2010	WISE	WISE	EUN	2.4 km	MPC · JPL
392698	2011 WP_{140}	—	October 20, 2011	Mount Lemmon	Mount Lemmon Survey	·	2.7 km	MPC · JPL
392699	2011 WH_{141}	—	November 17, 2006	Kitt Peak	Spacewatch	EOS	2.6 km	MPC · JPL
392700	2011 YA_{14}	—	August 24, 2008	Kitt Peak	Spacewatch	L4	7.9 km	MPC · JPL

== 392701–392800 ==
back to top

Designation			Discovery			Properties		Ref
Permanent	Provisional	Named after	Date	Site	Discoverer(s)	Category	Diam.	Ref
392701	2011 YK_{45}	—	September 28, 2008	Mount Lemmon	Mount Lemmon Survey	L4	7.7 km	MPC · JPL
392702	2011 YD_{50}	—	May 15, 2009	Kitt Peak	Spacewatch	KON	2.8 km	MPC · JPL
392703	2011 YD_{71}	—	November 2, 2010	Mount Lemmon	Mount Lemmon Survey	L4 · ERY	8.1 km	MPC · JPL
392704	2012 AE_{1}	—	April 18, 2007	Mount Lemmon	Mount Lemmon Survey	APO	580 m	MPC · JPL
392705	2012 BJ_{20}	—	March 19, 1996	Kitt Peak	Spacewatch	·	3.3 km	MPC · JPL
392706	2012 BJ_{31}	—	December 15, 2004	Campo Imperatore	CINEOS	·	1.0 km	MPC · JPL
392707	2012 BC_{48}	—	May 28, 2009	Mount Lemmon	Mount Lemmon Survey	NYS	960 m	MPC · JPL
392708	2012 BO_{117}	—	October 16, 1977	Palomar	C. J. van Houten, I. van Houten-Groeneveld, T. Gehrels	·	1.3 km	MPC · JPL
392709	2012 BG_{122}	—	February 13, 2002	Kitt Peak	Spacewatch	·	2.3 km	MPC · JPL
392710	2012 BH_{132}	—	August 8, 2004	Socorro	LINEAR	·	3.7 km	MPC · JPL
392711	2012 BW_{134}	—	March 10, 2005	Catalina	CSS	·	1.2 km	MPC · JPL
392712	2012 BX_{136}	—	February 2, 2010	WISE	WISE	L4	10 km	MPC · JPL
392713	2012 DB_{18}	—	February 9, 2008	Kitt Peak	Spacewatch	·	2.2 km	MPC · JPL
392714	2012 DE_{79}	—	March 19, 2001	Anderson Mesa	LONEOS	·	1.4 km	MPC · JPL
392715	2012 FJ_{82}	—	February 8, 2008	Mount Lemmon	Mount Lemmon Survey	·	1.3 km	MPC · JPL
392716	2012 HN_{59}	—	November 5, 2005	Mount Lemmon	Mount Lemmon Survey	615	1.9 km	MPC · JPL
392717	2012 HM_{65}	—	December 14, 1995	Kitt Peak	Spacewatch	·	2.3 km	MPC · JPL
392718	2012 KN	—	January 15, 2010	WISE	WISE	L4	10 km	MPC · JPL
392719	2012 KT_{34}	—	October 19, 1998	Kitt Peak	Spacewatch	·	2.6 km	MPC · JPL
392720	2012 MD_{15}	—	September 6, 2007	Siding Spring	SSS	H	680 m	MPC · JPL
392721	2012 PD	—	March 2, 1998	Kitt Peak	Spacewatch	H	510 m	MPC · JPL
392722	2012 PM	—	September 14, 2007	Catalina	CSS	H	590 m	MPC · JPL
392723	2012 PD_{24}	—	October 6, 2005	Kitt Peak	Spacewatch	·	1.1 km	MPC · JPL
392724	2012 QF_{23}	—	December 10, 2009	Mount Lemmon	Mount Lemmon Survey	·	710 m	MPC · JPL
392725	2012 QY_{37}	—	October 4, 2004	Kitt Peak	Spacewatch	·	1.1 km	MPC · JPL
392726	2012 QD_{39}	—	August 12, 2012	Siding Spring	SSS	EUN	1.1 km	MPC · JPL
392727	2012 QB_{40}	—	September 11, 2004	Socorro	LINEAR	H	590 m	MPC · JPL
392728 Zdzisławłączny	2012 QJ_{52}	Zdzisławłączny	August 26, 2012	Kitt Peak	Spacewatch	615	1.5 km	MPC · JPL
392729	2012 RN_{1}	—	September 20, 2007	Kitt Peak	Spacewatch	H	490 m	MPC · JPL
392730	2012 RN_{7}	—	January 23, 2006	Catalina	CSS	·	3.0 km	MPC · JPL
392731	2012 RR_{9}	—	April 8, 2006	Catalina	CSS	H	630 m	MPC · JPL
392732	2012 RO_{11}	—	February 20, 2009	Kitt Peak	Spacewatch	·	3.4 km	MPC · JPL
392733	2012 RN_{13}	—	September 16, 1998	Kitt Peak	Spacewatch	·	2.3 km	MPC · JPL
392734	2012 RM_{20}	—	December 1, 2008	Mount Lemmon	Mount Lemmon Survey	·	1.8 km	MPC · JPL
392735	2012 RL_{22}	—	March 14, 2010	Kitt Peak	Spacewatch	(194)	2.2 km	MPC · JPL
392736	2012 RP_{29}	—	December 25, 2005	Mount Lemmon	Mount Lemmon Survey	MAS	780 m	MPC · JPL
392737	2012 RO_{30}	—	September 10, 2004	Socorro	LINEAR	·	1.1 km	MPC · JPL
392738	2012 RN_{32}	—	January 27, 2007	Kitt Peak	Spacewatch	·	810 m	MPC · JPL
392739	2012 SS_{11}	—	September 18, 2003	Kitt Peak	Spacewatch	GAL	1.4 km	MPC · JPL
392740	2012 SS_{27}	—	February 24, 2006	Kitt Peak	Spacewatch	·	1.7 km	MPC · JPL
392741	2012 SQ_{31}	—	December 27, 2009	Kitt Peak	Spacewatch	·	740 m	MPC · JPL
392742	2012 SS_{31}	—	October 7, 2008	Mount Lemmon	Mount Lemmon Survey	·	1.9 km	MPC · JPL
392743	2012 SG_{38}	—	February 9, 2005	Kitt Peak	Spacewatch	·	1.7 km	MPC · JPL
392744	2012 SQ_{54}	—	October 22, 2008	Kitt Peak	Spacewatch	·	1.4 km	MPC · JPL
392745	2012 SD_{60}	—	September 17, 2012	Kitt Peak	Spacewatch	EUN	1.4 km	MPC · JPL
392746	2012 SX_{62}	—	October 9, 2002	Socorro	LINEAR	·	860 m	MPC · JPL
392747	2012 TU_{2}	—	September 20, 2001	Socorro	LINEAR	·	1.2 km	MPC · JPL
392748	2012 TA_{3}	—	October 1, 2005	Kitt Peak	Spacewatch	·	1.0 km	MPC · JPL
392749	2012 TF_{3}	—	December 1, 2006	Mount Lemmon	Mount Lemmon Survey	·	530 m	MPC · JPL
392750	2012 TD_{6}	—	September 23, 2008	Mount Lemmon	Mount Lemmon Survey	PHO	1.0 km	MPC · JPL
392751	2012 TD_{9}	—	September 12, 2005	Kitt Peak	Spacewatch	·	780 m	MPC · JPL
392752	2012 TK_{10}	—	March 18, 2010	Mount Lemmon	Mount Lemmon Survey	·	1.8 km	MPC · JPL
392753	2012 TP_{12}	—	May 23, 2006	Kitt Peak	Spacewatch	EUN	1.2 km	MPC · JPL
392754	2012 TQ_{15}	—	November 5, 1999	Kitt Peak	Spacewatch	H	630 m	MPC · JPL
392755	2012 TC_{17}	—	December 7, 2005	Kitt Peak	Spacewatch	MAS	670 m	MPC · JPL
392756	2012 TX_{21}	—	October 10, 2004	Kitt Peak	Spacewatch	·	1.2 km	MPC · JPL
392757	2012 TH_{22}	—	October 24, 2009	Kitt Peak	Spacewatch	·	800 m	MPC · JPL
392758	2012 TD_{32}	—	November 30, 2005	Mount Lemmon	Mount Lemmon Survey	NYS	1.0 km	MPC · JPL
392759	2012 TD_{34}	—	March 11, 2011	Mount Lemmon	Mount Lemmon Survey	·	820 m	MPC · JPL
392760	2012 TK_{35}	—	September 25, 2000	Kitt Peak	Spacewatch	L5	6.8 km	MPC · JPL
392761	2012 TT_{53}	—	February 16, 2007	Mount Lemmon	Mount Lemmon Survey	·	850 m	MPC · JPL
392762	2012 TC_{56}	—	October 19, 1995	Kitt Peak	Spacewatch	BAR	1.4 km	MPC · JPL
392763	2012 TG_{56}	—	April 10, 2010	Mount Lemmon	Mount Lemmon Survey	·	1.2 km	MPC · JPL
392764	2012 TC_{57}	—	May 27, 2006	Kitt Peak	Spacewatch	·	2.0 km	MPC · JPL
392765	2012 TH_{57}	—	October 25, 2008	Kitt Peak	Spacewatch	·	1.5 km	MPC · JPL
392766	2012 TJ_{57}	—	September 29, 2008	Mount Lemmon	Mount Lemmon Survey	·	1.6 km	MPC · JPL
392767	2012 TT_{60}	—	April 28, 2000	Kitt Peak	Spacewatch	H	710 m	MPC · JPL
392768	2012 TJ_{62}	—	July 4, 2005	Kitt Peak	Spacewatch	·	800 m	MPC · JPL
392769	2012 TY_{70}	—	September 30, 2003	Kitt Peak	Spacewatch	·	1.8 km	MPC · JPL
392770	2012 TK_{86}	—	October 27, 2005	Kitt Peak	Spacewatch	·	1.1 km	MPC · JPL
392771	2012 TO_{88}	—	March 11, 2005	Mount Lemmon	Mount Lemmon Survey	·	2.1 km	MPC · JPL
392772	2012 TO_{91}	—	October 29, 2005	Mount Lemmon	Mount Lemmon Survey	·	1.1 km	MPC · JPL
392773	2012 TG_{92}	—	April 7, 2006	Mount Lemmon	Mount Lemmon Survey	(194)	1.3 km	MPC · JPL
392774	2012 TW_{92}	—	March 11, 2007	Kitt Peak	Spacewatch	·	770 m	MPC · JPL
392775	2012 TX_{92}	—	December 2, 2005	Kitt Peak	Spacewatch	·	2.0 km	MPC · JPL
392776	2012 TT_{95}	—	March 8, 2005	Mount Lemmon	Mount Lemmon Survey	·	1.6 km	MPC · JPL
392777	2012 TO_{104}	—	May 5, 2006	Kitt Peak	Spacewatch	·	1.4 km	MPC · JPL
392778	2012 TU_{105}	—	November 16, 2006	Mount Lemmon	Mount Lemmon Survey	·	770 m	MPC · JPL
392779	2012 TZ_{107}	—	April 25, 2004	Kitt Peak	Spacewatch	·	840 m	MPC · JPL
392780	2012 TW_{111}	—	April 13, 2002	Kitt Peak	Spacewatch	·	1.3 km	MPC · JPL
392781	2012 TR_{114}	—	January 15, 2005	Catalina	CSS	·	1.9 km	MPC · JPL
392782	2012 TC_{119}	—	November 20, 2009	Kitt Peak	Spacewatch	·	740 m	MPC · JPL
392783	2012 TF_{129}	—	September 30, 2003	Kitt Peak	Spacewatch	·	1.9 km	MPC · JPL
392784	2012 TG_{130}	—	December 14, 2004	Socorro	LINEAR	·	1.2 km	MPC · JPL
392785	2012 TU_{142}	—	November 3, 2008	Catalina	CSS	BRG	1.8 km	MPC · JPL
392786	2012 TF_{150}	—	December 2, 2005	Kitt Peak	Spacewatch	NYS	1.1 km	MPC · JPL
392787	2012 TN_{153}	—	September 25, 2007	Mount Lemmon	Mount Lemmon Survey	·	1.3 km	MPC · JPL
392788	2012 TD_{161}	—	April 16, 2007	Mount Lemmon	Mount Lemmon Survey	V	650 m	MPC · JPL
392789	2012 TS_{163}	—	March 18, 2010	Kitt Peak	Spacewatch	·	1.2 km	MPC · JPL
392790	2012 TO_{165}	—	December 24, 2005	Kitt Peak	Spacewatch	·	1.1 km	MPC · JPL
392791	2012 TZ_{168}	—	March 13, 2007	Mount Lemmon	Mount Lemmon Survey	V	590 m	MPC · JPL
392792	2012 TV_{176}	—	February 15, 2010	Mount Lemmon	Mount Lemmon Survey	NYS	910 m	MPC · JPL
392793	2012 TQ_{185}	—	November 20, 2003	Socorro	LINEAR	·	2.1 km	MPC · JPL
392794	2012 TH_{186}	—	April 5, 2010	Kitt Peak	Spacewatch	·	2.0 km	MPC · JPL
392795	2012 TK_{186}	—	March 18, 2004	Kitt Peak	Spacewatch	·	2.0 km	MPC · JPL
392796	2012 TV_{187}	—	March 21, 2004	Kitt Peak	Spacewatch	PHO	830 m	MPC · JPL
392797	2012 TP_{188}	—	February 18, 2010	Mount Lemmon	Mount Lemmon Survey	·	1.9 km	MPC · JPL
392798	2012 TB_{190}	—	September 19, 2012	Mount Lemmon	Mount Lemmon Survey	·	2.3 km	MPC · JPL
392799	2012 TS_{192}	—	December 1, 2005	Kitt Peak	Spacewatch	·	1.4 km	MPC · JPL
392800	2012 TL_{194}	—	March 24, 2006	Mount Lemmon	Mount Lemmon Survey	·	1.3 km	MPC · JPL

== 392801–392900 ==
back to top

Designation			Discovery			Properties		Ref
Permanent	Provisional	Named after	Date	Site	Discoverer(s)	Category	Diam.	Ref
392801	2012 TS_{197}	—	March 14, 2001	Prescott	P. G. Comba	EUN	1.3 km	MPC · JPL
392802	2012 TN_{198}	—	November 20, 2008	Mount Lemmon	Mount Lemmon Survey	·	1.4 km	MPC · JPL
392803	2012 TS_{206}	—	October 26, 2008	Kitt Peak	Spacewatch	·	2.8 km	MPC · JPL
392804	2012 TL_{210}	—	October 10, 2007	Catalina	CSS	·	2.7 km	MPC · JPL
392805	2012 TA_{213}	—	October 11, 1997	Kitt Peak	Spacewatch	NYS	1.3 km	MPC · JPL
392806	2012 TT_{213}	—	November 19, 1996	Kitt Peak	Spacewatch	(5)	1.2 km	MPC · JPL
392807	2012 TD_{223}	—	September 10, 2007	Kitt Peak	Spacewatch	·	1.6 km	MPC · JPL
392808	2012 TD_{232}	—	August 21, 2003	Campo Imperatore	CINEOS	EUN	1.3 km	MPC · JPL
392809	2012 TG_{241}	—	April 10, 2010	Mount Lemmon	Mount Lemmon Survey	·	1.5 km	MPC · JPL
392810	2012 TC_{242}	—	June 24, 2011	Mount Lemmon	Mount Lemmon Survey	·	780 m	MPC · JPL
392811	2012 TR_{243}	—	February 17, 2010	Kitt Peak	Spacewatch	·	1.1 km	MPC · JPL
392812	2012 TX_{245}	—	August 28, 2012	Mount Lemmon	Mount Lemmon Survey	·	1.8 km	MPC · JPL
392813	2012 TF_{257}	—	December 1, 2008	Mount Lemmon	Mount Lemmon Survey	·	1.9 km	MPC · JPL
392814	2012 TH_{258}	—	April 25, 2004	Kitt Peak	Spacewatch	·	750 m	MPC · JPL
392815	2012 TF_{276}	—	September 6, 2008	Mount Lemmon	Mount Lemmon Survey	·	1.2 km	MPC · JPL
392816	2012 TR_{282}	—	October 5, 2012	Kitt Peak	Spacewatch	H	550 m	MPC · JPL
392817	2012 TZ_{283}	—	January 13, 1996	Kitt Peak	Spacewatch	·	1.1 km	MPC · JPL
392818	2012 TY_{286}	—	May 4, 2006	Kitt Peak	Spacewatch	EUN	1.2 km	MPC · JPL
392819	2012 TY_{290}	—	November 20, 2003	Socorro	LINEAR	·	1.9 km	MPC · JPL
392820	2012 TE_{293}	—	March 4, 1994	Kitt Peak	Spacewatch	·	1.7 km	MPC · JPL
392821	2012 TU_{294}	—	October 14, 2012	Kitt Peak	Spacewatch	·	1.7 km	MPC · JPL
392822	2012 TJ_{295}	—	September 25, 1998	Kitt Peak	Spacewatch	·	1.7 km	MPC · JPL
392823	2012 TP_{297}	—	November 24, 2008	Mount Lemmon	Mount Lemmon Survey	·	2.4 km	MPC · JPL
392824	2012 TD_{300}	—	September 13, 2005	Kitt Peak	Spacewatch	·	810 m	MPC · JPL
392825	2012 TP_{302}	—	October 20, 2003	Kitt Peak	Spacewatch	·	1.9 km	MPC · JPL
392826	2012 TT_{302}	—	August 24, 2007	Kitt Peak	Spacewatch	·	1.8 km	MPC · JPL
392827	2012 TU_{303}	—	April 14, 1997	Kitt Peak	Spacewatch	·	840 m	MPC · JPL
392828	2012 TJ_{305}	—	November 19, 2008	Mount Lemmon	Mount Lemmon Survey	EUN	1.3 km	MPC · JPL
392829	2012 TL_{305}	—	May 25, 2006	Kitt Peak	Spacewatch	GEF	1.5 km	MPC · JPL
392830	2012 TD_{308}	—	August 28, 2006	Kitt Peak	Spacewatch	·	2.5 km	MPC · JPL
392831	2012 TJ_{308}	—	January 20, 2009	Socorro	LINEAR	·	2.7 km	MPC · JPL
392832	2012 TE_{314}	—	November 12, 2001	Socorro	LINEAR	·	1.5 km	MPC · JPL
392833	2012 TJ_{316}	—	February 16, 2010	Mount Lemmon	Mount Lemmon Survey	·	1.7 km	MPC · JPL
392834	2012 TZ_{317}	—	November 21, 2008	Kitt Peak	Spacewatch	·	2.3 km	MPC · JPL
392835	2012 UW_{5}	—	April 12, 2004	Kitt Peak	Spacewatch	·	720 m	MPC · JPL
392836	2012 UT_{6}	—	June 12, 1997	Kitt Peak	Spacewatch	·	1.2 km	MPC · JPL
392837	2012 UE_{10}	—	December 10, 2005	Kitt Peak	Spacewatch	·	1.2 km	MPC · JPL
392838	2012 UO_{16}	—	April 17, 2010	Mount Lemmon	Mount Lemmon Survey	·	1.3 km	MPC · JPL
392839	2012 UV_{22}	—	September 4, 2008	Kitt Peak	Spacewatch	·	1.1 km	MPC · JPL
392840	2012 UX_{26}	—	January 10, 2007	Kitt Peak	Spacewatch	·	900 m	MPC · JPL
392841	2012 UY_{28}	—	March 23, 2006	Mount Lemmon	Mount Lemmon Survey	·	2.1 km	MPC · JPL
392842	2012 UM_{30}	—	December 16, 2004	Kitt Peak	Spacewatch	·	1.7 km	MPC · JPL
392843	2012 UC_{33}	—	June 4, 2011	Mount Lemmon	Mount Lemmon Survey	·	750 m	MPC · JPL
392844	2012 UH_{36}	—	August 26, 2001	Anderson Mesa	LONEOS	·	3.2 km	MPC · JPL
392845	2012 UD_{38}	—	October 22, 2005	Kitt Peak	Spacewatch	·	960 m	MPC · JPL
392846	2012 UZ_{38}	—	October 25, 2005	Anderson Mesa	LONEOS	·	1.0 km	MPC · JPL
392847	2012 UK_{39}	—	November 30, 2008	Kitt Peak	Spacewatch	·	1.7 km	MPC · JPL
392848	2012 UQ_{51}	—	December 30, 2008	Mount Lemmon	Mount Lemmon Survey	·	1.7 km	MPC · JPL
392849	2012 UC_{56}	—	October 14, 2001	Socorro	LINEAR	·	2.5 km	MPC · JPL
392850	2012 UA_{58}	—	October 22, 2003	Kitt Peak	Spacewatch	NEM	1.9 km	MPC · JPL
392851	2012 UD_{59}	—	October 15, 2001	Kitt Peak	Spacewatch	EOS	2.4 km	MPC · JPL
392852	2012 UT_{60}	—	April 13, 2004	Kitt Peak	Spacewatch	·	990 m	MPC · JPL
392853	2012 UA_{64}	—	January 1, 2008	Catalina	CSS	·	2.8 km	MPC · JPL
392854	2012 UP_{69}	—	April 28, 2003	Kitt Peak	Spacewatch	·	1.5 km	MPC · JPL
392855	2012 UM_{70}	—	December 31, 2008	Catalina	CSS	·	1.8 km	MPC · JPL
392856	2012 UC_{73}	—	October 21, 2008	Kitt Peak	Spacewatch	·	1.2 km	MPC · JPL
392857	2012 UG_{73}	—	April 18, 2007	Kitt Peak	Spacewatch	·	1.0 km	MPC · JPL
392858	2012 US_{74}	—	April 18, 2007	Kitt Peak	Spacewatch	PHO	2.2 km	MPC · JPL
392859	2012 UP_{77}	—	November 6, 2005	Kitt Peak	Spacewatch	V	710 m	MPC · JPL
392860	2012 UC_{79}	—	December 3, 2007	Kitt Peak	Spacewatch	THM	2.0 km	MPC · JPL
392861	2012 UL_{81}	—	November 11, 2007	Mount Lemmon	Mount Lemmon Survey	THM	2.0 km	MPC · JPL
392862	2012 UR_{83}	—	November 19, 2003	Anderson Mesa	LONEOS	·	2.6 km	MPC · JPL
392863	2012 UO_{85}	—	September 6, 2002	Socorro	LINEAR	·	890 m	MPC · JPL
392864	2012 UX_{86}	—	April 7, 2006	Kitt Peak	Spacewatch	EUN	1.5 km	MPC · JPL
392865	2012 UW_{89}	—	October 11, 2007	Mount Lemmon	Mount Lemmon Survey	·	2.2 km	MPC · JPL
392866	2012 UG_{93}	—	October 1, 2008	Mount Lemmon	Mount Lemmon Survey	·	1.7 km	MPC · JPL
392867	2012 UW_{93}	—	January 9, 2005	Catalina	CSS	EUN	1.4 km	MPC · JPL
392868	2012 UV_{95}	—	February 23, 2007	Kitt Peak	Spacewatch	·	830 m	MPC · JPL
392869	2012 UW_{100}	—	February 2, 2005	Kitt Peak	Spacewatch	·	1.2 km	MPC · JPL
392870	2012 UO_{101}	—	November 5, 2007	Kitt Peak	Spacewatch	·	1.7 km	MPC · JPL
392871	2012 UN_{105}	—	October 9, 2008	Mount Lemmon	Mount Lemmon Survey	·	1.6 km	MPC · JPL
392872	2012 UR_{108}	—	April 7, 2006	Kitt Peak	Spacewatch	·	1.7 km	MPC · JPL
392873	2012 UN_{114}	—	November 21, 2009	Kitt Peak	Spacewatch	·	1.1 km	MPC · JPL
392874	2012 UJ_{116}	—	October 25, 2003	Kitt Peak	Spacewatch	·	1.8 km	MPC · JPL
392875	2012 UO_{118}	—	November 18, 2003	Kitt Peak	Spacewatch	·	1.6 km	MPC · JPL
392876	2012 UV_{125}	—	October 24, 2005	Kitt Peak	Spacewatch	·	840 m	MPC · JPL
392877	2012 UW_{148}	—	December 10, 2004	Kitt Peak	Spacewatch	·	1.1 km	MPC · JPL
392878	2012 UU_{151}	—	October 21, 2008	Mount Lemmon	Mount Lemmon Survey	EUN	1.0 km	MPC · JPL
392879	2012 UX_{161}	—	April 26, 2009	Siding Spring	SSS	T_{j} (2.98)	4.6 km	MPC · JPL
392880	2012 UO_{165}	—	April 11, 2005	Mount Lemmon	Mount Lemmon Survey	·	2.1 km	MPC · JPL
392881	2012 UV_{168}	—	November 3, 2005	Mount Lemmon	Mount Lemmon Survey	·	1.5 km	MPC · JPL
392882	2012 UH_{172}	—	August 23, 2008	Kitt Peak	Spacewatch	·	1.3 km	MPC · JPL
392883	2012 UJ_{174}	—	November 11, 2007	Mount Lemmon	Mount Lemmon Survey	H	820 m	MPC · JPL
392884	2012 US_{174}	—	October 8, 2007	Kitt Peak	Spacewatch	·	1.6 km	MPC · JPL
392885	2012 VW_{7}	—	September 27, 2006	Kitt Peak	Spacewatch	·	2.6 km	MPC · JPL
392886	2012 VX_{12}	—	June 4, 2011	Mount Lemmon	Mount Lemmon Survey	·	730 m	MPC · JPL
392887	2012 VD_{17}	—	November 21, 2003	Socorro	LINEAR	·	2.6 km	MPC · JPL
392888	2012 VK_{24}	—	May 15, 2001	Anderson Mesa	LONEOS	·	1.0 km	MPC · JPL
392889	2012 VE_{31}	—	June 9, 2007	Kitt Peak	Spacewatch	V	780 m	MPC · JPL
392890	2012 VY_{31}	—	November 30, 2008	Kitt Peak	Spacewatch	·	1.5 km	MPC · JPL
392891	2012 VM_{33}	—	December 18, 2009	Mount Lemmon	Mount Lemmon Survey	·	860 m	MPC · JPL
392892	2012 VO_{33}	—	December 18, 2004	Kitt Peak	Spacewatch	·	1.3 km	MPC · JPL
392893	2012 VW_{33}	—	September 12, 2007	Anderson Mesa	LONEOS	·	2.1 km	MPC · JPL
392894	2012 VA_{34}	—	September 25, 2006	Kitt Peak	Spacewatch	LIX	3.2 km	MPC · JPL
392895	2012 VR_{38}	—	September 23, 2005	Kitt Peak	Spacewatch	·	780 m	MPC · JPL
392896	2012 VC_{42}	—	November 14, 2007	Kitt Peak	Spacewatch	KOR	1.4 km	MPC · JPL
392897	2012 VH_{42}	—	March 22, 2009	Mount Lemmon	Mount Lemmon Survey	·	2.1 km	MPC · JPL
392898	2012 VX_{42}	—	October 30, 2008	Mount Lemmon	Mount Lemmon Survey	·	1.6 km	MPC · JPL
392899	2012 VY_{43}	—	December 1, 2008	Kitt Peak	Spacewatch	·	1.4 km	MPC · JPL
392900	2012 VF_{49}	—	November 8, 2007	Mount Lemmon	Mount Lemmon Survey	·	2.3 km	MPC · JPL

== 392901–393000 ==
back to top

Designation			Discovery			Properties		Ref
Permanent	Provisional	Named after	Date	Site	Discoverer(s)	Category	Diam.	Ref
392901	2012 VP_{51}	—	September 19, 2007	Kitt Peak	Spacewatch	(17392)	1.4 km	MPC · JPL
392902	2012 VQ_{51}	—	December 17, 2001	Socorro	LINEAR	·	3.1 km	MPC · JPL
392903	2012 VA_{55}	—	December 29, 2008	Mount Lemmon	Mount Lemmon Survey	·	1.7 km	MPC · JPL
392904	2012 VL_{55}	—	May 14, 2004	Kitt Peak	Spacewatch	·	3.0 km	MPC · JPL
392905	2012 VQ_{55}	—	May 25, 2006	Kitt Peak	Spacewatch	·	1.7 km	MPC · JPL
392906	2012 VK_{56}	—	November 19, 2009	Kitt Peak	Spacewatch	·	650 m	MPC · JPL
392907	2012 VV_{56}	—	October 16, 2003	Anderson Mesa	LONEOS	·	2.1 km	MPC · JPL
392908	2012 VM_{60}	—	November 18, 2008	Kitt Peak	Spacewatch	·	1.1 km	MPC · JPL
392909	2012 VX_{61}	—	October 23, 2003	Kitt Peak	Spacewatch	·	1.8 km	MPC · JPL
392910	2012 VP_{64}	—	April 17, 2005	Kitt Peak	Spacewatch	·	2.5 km	MPC · JPL
392911	2012 VH_{74}	—	October 17, 1995	Kitt Peak	Spacewatch	·	730 m	MPC · JPL
392912	2012 VR_{77}	—	March 20, 2010	Kitt Peak	Spacewatch	·	1.8 km	MPC · JPL
392913	2012 VC_{83}	—	February 16, 2010	Kitt Peak	Spacewatch	·	1.5 km	MPC · JPL
392914	2012 VJ_{84}	—	February 1, 2001	Kitt Peak	Spacewatch	·	1.5 km	MPC · JPL
392915	2012 VK_{86}	—	September 20, 2007	Kitt Peak	Spacewatch	AGN	1.3 km	MPC · JPL
392916	2012 VE_{87}	—	March 10, 2007	Mount Lemmon	Mount Lemmon Survey	V	750 m	MPC · JPL
392917	2012 VF_{87}	—	August 24, 2008	Kitt Peak	Spacewatch	·	1.2 km	MPC · JPL
392918	2012 VL_{88}	—	December 15, 2007	Mount Lemmon	Mount Lemmon Survey	·	2.5 km	MPC · JPL
392919	2012 VQ_{88}	—	May 10, 2007	Mount Lemmon	Mount Lemmon Survey	V	910 m	MPC · JPL
392920	2012 VP_{91}	—	April 21, 2006	Kitt Peak	Spacewatch	·	1.2 km	MPC · JPL
392921	2012 VQ_{91}	—	December 16, 2007	Mount Lemmon	Mount Lemmon Survey	EOS	1.9 km	MPC · JPL
392922	2012 VF_{92}	—	December 30, 2000	Kitt Peak	Spacewatch	(5)	1.3 km	MPC · JPL
392923	2012 VN_{92}	—	January 6, 2005	Catalina	CSS	·	1.8 km	MPC · JPL
392924	2012 VW_{96}	—	April 20, 2007	Kitt Peak	Spacewatch	·	1.4 km	MPC · JPL
392925	2012 VZ_{96}	—	November 6, 2012	Kitt Peak	Spacewatch	V	730 m	MPC · JPL
392926	2012 VO_{97}	—	May 2, 2006	Mount Lemmon	Mount Lemmon Survey	·	2.1 km	MPC · JPL
392927	2012 VX_{98}	—	December 22, 2003	Socorro	LINEAR	DOR	2.7 km	MPC · JPL
392928	2012 VR_{104}	—	December 5, 2008	Mount Lemmon	Mount Lemmon Survey	TEL	1.7 km	MPC · JPL
392929	2012 VS_{107}	—	December 4, 2008	Mount Lemmon	Mount Lemmon Survey	·	1.3 km	MPC · JPL
392930	2012 VX_{107}	—	November 14, 2007	Kitt Peak	Spacewatch	·	1.8 km	MPC · JPL
392931	2012 VY_{107}	—	April 10, 2010	Mount Lemmon	Mount Lemmon Survey	·	1.1 km	MPC · JPL
392932	2012 VC_{108}	—	March 24, 2006	Kitt Peak	Spacewatch	(5)	1.4 km	MPC · JPL
392933	2012 VV_{108}	—	October 15, 2001	Kitt Peak	Spacewatch	·	2.6 km	MPC · JPL
392934	2012 VM_{110}	—	October 1, 2003	Kitt Peak	Spacewatch	·	1.2 km	MPC · JPL
392935	2012 VX_{110}	—	January 16, 2005	Kitt Peak	Spacewatch	·	1.2 km	MPC · JPL
392936	2012 VS_{112}	—	January 15, 2009	Kitt Peak	Spacewatch	·	1.7 km	MPC · JPL
392937	2012 WN_{1}	—	October 24, 2008	Kitt Peak	Spacewatch	·	1.2 km	MPC · JPL
392938	2012 WP_{1}	—	February 20, 2002	Kitt Peak	Spacewatch	·	910 m	MPC · JPL
392939	2012 WN_{3}	—	February 16, 2010	Mount Lemmon	Mount Lemmon Survey	·	1.4 km	MPC · JPL
392940	2012 WU_{3}	—	October 24, 2005	Kitt Peak	Spacewatch	·	830 m	MPC · JPL
392941	2012 WZ_{3}	—	January 20, 2009	Catalina	CSS	·	2.2 km	MPC · JPL
392942	2012 WU_{5}	—	September 13, 2007	Mount Lemmon	Mount Lemmon Survey	·	1.7 km	MPC · JPL
392943	2012 WV_{7}	—	October 29, 2008	Kitt Peak	Spacewatch	·	3.8 km	MPC · JPL
392944	2012 WN_{8}	—	November 14, 2007	Kitt Peak	Spacewatch	KOR	1.5 km	MPC · JPL
392945	2012 WN_{9}	—	December 21, 2008	Socorro	LINEAR	·	2.1 km	MPC · JPL
392946	2012 WX_{9}	—	April 22, 2004	Kitt Peak	Spacewatch	·	710 m	MPC · JPL
392947	2012 WC_{13}	—	September 28, 2003	Kitt Peak	Spacewatch	·	1.2 km	MPC · JPL
392948	2012 WJ_{13}	—	August 28, 2006	Kitt Peak	Spacewatch	·	1.9 km	MPC · JPL
392949	2012 WK_{15}	—	December 19, 2004	Mount Lemmon	Mount Lemmon Survey	·	1.7 km	MPC · JPL
392950	2012 WK_{18}	—	February 2, 2005	Kitt Peak	Spacewatch	·	1.3 km	MPC · JPL
392951	2012 WY_{18}	—	October 1, 2003	Anderson Mesa	LONEOS	HNS	1.7 km	MPC · JPL
392952 Hermitageshelter	2012 WT_{20}	Hermitageshelter	March 18, 2009	Catalina	CSS	EOS	2.1 km	MPC · JPL
392953	2012 WT_{23}	—	October 12, 2007	Catalina	CSS	PAD	1.6 km	MPC · JPL
392954	2012 WG_{25}	—	December 12, 1998	Kitt Peak	Spacewatch	·	850 m	MPC · JPL
392955	2012 WJ_{25}	—	November 29, 2003	Kitt Peak	Spacewatch	HOF	2.6 km	MPC · JPL
392956	2012 WK_{26}	—	September 9, 2007	Kitt Peak	Spacewatch	·	1.7 km	MPC · JPL
392957	2012 WF_{27}	—	May 8, 2006	Mount Lemmon	Mount Lemmon Survey	HNS	1.3 km	MPC · JPL
392958	2012 WK_{28}	—	December 13, 2006	Kitt Peak	Spacewatch	·	1.1 km	MPC · JPL
392959	2012 WC_{29}	—	August 21, 2004	Siding Spring	SSS	·	1.4 km	MPC · JPL
392960	2012 WZ_{29}	—	October 23, 1997	Kitt Peak	Spacewatch	·	1.3 km	MPC · JPL
392961	2012 WC_{35}	—	November 8, 2007	Mount Lemmon	Mount Lemmon Survey	·	2.9 km	MPC · JPL
392962	2012 XU_{2}	—	May 11, 2010	Mount Lemmon	Mount Lemmon Survey	EOS	2.2 km	MPC · JPL
392963	2012 XE_{5}	—	February 24, 2006	Kitt Peak	Spacewatch	·	1.3 km	MPC · JPL
392964	2012 XW_{7}	—	May 22, 2010	Siding Spring	SSS	·	2.6 km	MPC · JPL
392965	2012 XQ_{10}	—	December 15, 2004	Socorro	LINEAR	·	1.9 km	MPC · JPL
392966	2012 XF_{11}	—	September 28, 2008	Catalina	CSS	V	620 m	MPC · JPL
392967	2012 XN_{12}	—	March 15, 2007	Mount Lemmon	Mount Lemmon Survey	V	590 m	MPC · JPL
392968	2012 XS_{17}	—	December 4, 2008	Kitt Peak	Spacewatch	(5)	1.2 km	MPC · JPL
392969	2012 XT_{21}	—	March 10, 2005	Mount Lemmon	Mount Lemmon Survey	AST	1.9 km	MPC · JPL
392970	2012 XM_{24}	—	April 9, 2010	Kitt Peak	Spacewatch	·	1.9 km	MPC · JPL
392971	2012 XS_{27}	—	October 8, 2008	Mount Lemmon	Mount Lemmon Survey	V	820 m	MPC · JPL
392972	2012 XS_{29}	—	February 23, 2003	Kitt Peak	Spacewatch	THM	2.1 km	MPC · JPL
392973	2012 XJ_{33}	—	December 19, 2007	Mount Lemmon	Mount Lemmon Survey	LIX	4.1 km	MPC · JPL
392974	2012 XK_{40}	—	October 10, 2007	Mount Lemmon	Mount Lemmon Survey	·	1.6 km	MPC · JPL
392975	2012 XA_{41}	—	January 6, 2005	Catalina	CSS	EUN	1.3 km	MPC · JPL
392976	2012 XV_{42}	—	January 1, 2003	Kitt Peak	Spacewatch	·	3.1 km	MPC · JPL
392977	2012 XC_{43}	—	June 12, 2004	Kitt Peak	Spacewatch	·	5.1 km	MPC · JPL
392978	2012 XR_{43}	—	October 10, 2007	Mount Lemmon	Mount Lemmon Survey	·	2.5 km	MPC · JPL
392979	2012 XW_{46}	—	January 15, 2010	WISE	WISE	·	3.0 km	MPC · JPL
392980	2012 XJ_{47}	—	March 15, 2008	Kitt Peak	Spacewatch	HYG	2.6 km	MPC · JPL
392981	2012 XU_{49}	—	January 1, 2009	Mount Lemmon	Mount Lemmon Survey	·	2.8 km	MPC · JPL
392982	2012 XS_{57}	—	December 29, 2008	Mount Lemmon	Mount Lemmon Survey	·	1.8 km	MPC · JPL
392983	2012 XY_{58}	—	December 19, 2004	Anderson Mesa	LONEOS	EUN	1.7 km	MPC · JPL
392984	2012 XZ_{58}	—	November 10, 2001	Socorro	LINEAR	·	1.1 km	MPC · JPL
392985	2012 XY_{59}	—	January 31, 2009	Mount Lemmon	Mount Lemmon Survey	·	1.6 km	MPC · JPL
392986	2012 XM_{63}	—	January 16, 2008	Mount Lemmon	Mount Lemmon Survey	·	3.5 km	MPC · JPL
392987	2012 XJ_{64}	—	February 14, 2004	Kitt Peak	Spacewatch	·	1.8 km	MPC · JPL
392988	2012 XF_{69}	—	November 8, 2008	Mount Lemmon	Mount Lemmon Survey	·	2.1 km	MPC · JPL
392989	2012 XZ_{79}	—	October 26, 2005	Kitt Peak	Spacewatch	V	750 m	MPC · JPL
392990	2012 XY_{83}	—	November 13, 2006	Catalina	CSS	·	3.3 km	MPC · JPL
392991	2012 XN_{94}	—	November 18, 2007	Mount Lemmon	Mount Lemmon Survey	KOR	1.4 km	MPC · JPL
392992	2012 XT_{94}	—	December 8, 2005	Kitt Peak	Spacewatch	·	1.0 km	MPC · JPL
392993	2012 XF_{100}	—	October 6, 1999	Socorro	LINEAR	·	1.5 km	MPC · JPL
392994	2012 XM_{104}	—	November 17, 2006	Mount Lemmon	Mount Lemmon Survey	HYG	3.1 km	MPC · JPL
392995	2012 XZ_{110}	—	September 9, 2007	Kitt Peak	Spacewatch	·	1.7 km	MPC · JPL
392996	2012 XA_{118}	—	December 19, 2007	Mount Lemmon	Mount Lemmon Survey	EOS	2.3 km	MPC · JPL
392997	2012 XM_{118}	—	November 25, 2006	Kitt Peak	Spacewatch	·	3.8 km	MPC · JPL
392998	2012 XN_{119}	—	December 18, 2003	Kitt Peak	Spacewatch	GEF	1.7 km	MPC · JPL
392999	2012 XR_{119}	—	December 2, 1996	Kitt Peak	Spacewatch	EOS	2.2 km	MPC · JPL
393000	2012 XK_{120}	—	September 18, 2003	Socorro	LINEAR	·	1.3 km	MPC · JPL

back to top

== See also ==
- Meanings of minor-planet names: 392001–393000
