= List of minor planets: 391001–392000 =

The following is a partial list of minor planets, running from minor-planet number 391001 through 392000, inclusive. The primary data for this and other partial lists is based on JPL's "Small-Body Orbital Elements" and data available from the Minor Planet Center. Critical list information is also provided by the MPC, unless otherwise specified from Lowell Observatory. A detailed description of the table's columns and additional sources are given on the main page including a complete list of every page in this series, and a statistical break-up on the dynamical classification of minor planets.

Also see the summary list of all named bodies in numerical and alphabetical order, and the corresponding naming citations for the number range of this particular list. New namings may only be added to this list after official publication, as the preannouncement of names is condemned by the Working Group for Small Bodies Nomenclature of the International Astronomical Union.

Near-Earth obj.	MBA (inner)	MBA (outer)	Centaur
Mars-crosser	MBA (middle)	Jupiter trojan	Trans-Neptunian obj.
Unclassified

== 391001–391100 ==
Designation			Discovery			Properties		Ref
Permanent	Provisional	Named after	Date	Site	Discoverer(s)	Category	Diam.	Ref
391001	2005 SZ_{107}	—	September 26, 2005	Kitt Peak	Spacewatch	·	2.6 km	MPC · JPL
391002	2005 SM_{109}	—	September 26, 2005	Kitt Peak	Spacewatch	·	690 m	MPC · JPL
391003	2005 SJ_{115}	—	September 27, 2005	Kitt Peak	Spacewatch	·	800 m	MPC · JPL
391004	2005 SL_{115}	—	September 27, 2005	Kitt Peak	Spacewatch	·	910 m	MPC · JPL
391005	2005 SY_{122}	—	September 23, 2005	Catalina	CSS	·	830 m	MPC · JPL
391006	2005 SA_{123}	—	September 29, 2005	Anderson Mesa	LONEOS	·	3.5 km	MPC · JPL
391007	2005 SO_{154}	—	September 26, 2005	Kitt Peak	Spacewatch	·	690 m	MPC · JPL
391008	2005 SX_{170}	—	September 29, 2005	Kitt Peak	Spacewatch	·	640 m	MPC · JPL
391009	2005 SU_{171}	—	September 29, 2005	Kitt Peak	Spacewatch	·	820 m	MPC · JPL
391010	2005 SV_{171}	—	September 29, 2005	Kitt Peak	Spacewatch	·	810 m	MPC · JPL
391011	2005 SK_{173}	—	September 29, 2005	Kitt Peak	Spacewatch	·	2.0 km	MPC · JPL
391012	2005 SL_{174}	—	September 29, 2005	Kitt Peak	Spacewatch	EOS	1.8 km	MPC · JPL
391013	2005 SR_{177}	—	September 29, 2005	Kitt Peak	Spacewatch	·	940 m	MPC · JPL
391014	2005 SP_{178}	—	September 29, 2005	Palomar	NEAT	·	820 m	MPC · JPL
391015	2005 SU_{178}	—	September 29, 2005	Anderson Mesa	LONEOS	·	1.2 km	MPC · JPL
391016	2005 SF_{195}	—	September 9, 2005	Socorro	LINEAR	·	3.4 km	MPC · JPL
391017	2005 SX_{208}	—	September 30, 2005	Mount Lemmon	Mount Lemmon Survey	·	2.2 km	MPC · JPL
391018	2005 SJ_{233}	—	September 30, 2005	Mount Lemmon	Mount Lemmon Survey	EOS	2.3 km	MPC · JPL
391019	2005 SJ_{234}	—	September 29, 2005	Kitt Peak	Spacewatch	·	930 m	MPC · JPL
391020	2005 SE_{235}	—	September 29, 2005	Mount Lemmon	Mount Lemmon Survey	V	670 m	MPC · JPL
391021	2005 SG_{236}	—	September 29, 2005	Kitt Peak	Spacewatch	·	640 m	MPC · JPL
391022	2005 SC_{246}	—	September 30, 2005	Mount Lemmon	Mount Lemmon Survey	·	2.9 km	MPC · JPL
391023	2005 SX_{253}	—	September 22, 2005	Palomar	NEAT	·	3.0 km	MPC · JPL
391024	2005 SL_{256}	—	September 22, 2005	Palomar	NEAT	EOS	2.2 km	MPC · JPL
391025	2005 SA_{269}	—	September 25, 2005	Kitt Peak	Spacewatch	·	3.2 km	MPC · JPL
391026	2005 SS_{270}	—	September 30, 2005	Anderson Mesa	LONEOS	·	1.8 km	MPC · JPL
391027	2005 SV_{270}	—	September 30, 2005	Anderson Mesa	LONEOS	·	3.3 km	MPC · JPL
391028	2005 SK_{274}	—	September 29, 2005	Anderson Mesa	LONEOS	·	3.1 km	MPC · JPL
391029	2005 SG_{280}	—	September 25, 2005	Kitt Peak	Spacewatch	·	900 m	MPC · JPL
391030	2005 TY_{1}	—	October 1, 2005	Mount Lemmon	Mount Lemmon Survey	·	840 m	MPC · JPL
391031	2005 TU_{2}	—	October 1, 2005	Catalina	CSS	·	960 m	MPC · JPL
391032	2005 TQ_{10}	—	October 2, 2005	Anderson Mesa	LONEOS	EUP	6.0 km	MPC · JPL
391033	2005 TR_{15}	—	October 3, 2005	Mount Lemmon	Mount Lemmon Survey	AMO · slow	540 m	MPC · JPL
391034	2005 TX_{20}	—	October 1, 2005	Mount Lemmon	Mount Lemmon Survey	·	2.9 km	MPC · JPL
391035	2005 TT_{24}	—	October 1, 2005	Mount Lemmon	Mount Lemmon Survey	·	800 m	MPC · JPL
391036	2005 TV_{53}	—	October 1, 2005	Socorro	LINEAR	·	2.1 km	MPC · JPL
391037	2005 TC_{72}	—	October 3, 2005	Catalina	CSS	·	840 m	MPC · JPL
391038	2005 TS_{73}	—	October 7, 2005	Anderson Mesa	LONEOS	·	740 m	MPC · JPL
391039	2005 TO_{83}	—	May 10, 2003	Kitt Peak	Spacewatch	·	2.9 km	MPC · JPL
391040	2005 TV_{85}	—	October 3, 2005	Kitt Peak	Spacewatch	·	670 m	MPC · JPL
391041	2005 TV_{89}	—	October 5, 2005	Mount Lemmon	Mount Lemmon Survey	·	620 m	MPC · JPL
391042 Dubietis	2005 TP_{105}	Dubietis	October 8, 2005	Moletai	K. Černis	·	3.6 km	MPC · JPL
391043	2005 TV_{116}	—	October 7, 2005	Kitt Peak	Spacewatch	·	780 m	MPC · JPL
391044	2005 TY_{123}	—	October 7, 2005	Kitt Peak	Spacewatch	·	2.5 km	MPC · JPL
391045	2005 TF_{141}	—	October 8, 2005	Kitt Peak	Spacewatch	·	770 m	MPC · JPL
391046	2005 TC_{147}	—	September 29, 2005	Kitt Peak	Spacewatch	TIR	4.0 km	MPC · JPL
391047	2005 TE_{151}	—	October 8, 2005	Kitt Peak	Spacewatch	·	780 m	MPC · JPL
391048	2005 TO_{155}	—	October 9, 2005	Kitt Peak	Spacewatch	·	840 m	MPC · JPL
391049	2005 TH_{161}	—	October 9, 2005	Kitt Peak	Spacewatch	·	3.3 km	MPC · JPL
391050	2005 TO_{164}	—	October 9, 2005	Kitt Peak	Spacewatch	·	5.4 km	MPC · JPL
391051	2005 TG_{166}	—	October 9, 2005	Kitt Peak	Spacewatch	·	950 m	MPC · JPL
391052	2005 TE_{167}	—	October 9, 2005	Kitt Peak	Spacewatch	VER	3.2 km	MPC · JPL
391053	2005 TU_{169}	—	October 3, 2005	Kitt Peak	Spacewatch	·	900 m	MPC · JPL
391054	2005 TE_{176}	—	October 1, 2005	Kitt Peak	Spacewatch	·	680 m	MPC · JPL
391055	2005 TM_{195}	—	October 1, 2005	Kitt Peak	Spacewatch	·	810 m	MPC · JPL
391056	2005 UK_{4}	—	October 12, 2005	Kitt Peak	Spacewatch	·	1.2 km	MPC · JPL
391057	2005 UW_{7}	—	October 26, 2005	Ottmarsheim	C. Rinner	V	620 m	MPC · JPL
391058	2005 UJ_{36}	—	October 24, 2005	Kitt Peak	Spacewatch	·	4.3 km	MPC · JPL
391059	2005 UL_{36}	—	October 24, 2005	Kitt Peak	Spacewatch	·	840 m	MPC · JPL
391060	2005 UB_{43}	—	October 22, 2005	Kitt Peak	Spacewatch	·	760 m	MPC · JPL
391061	2005 UG_{43}	—	October 22, 2005	Kitt Peak	Spacewatch	V	550 m	MPC · JPL
391062	2005 UH_{57}	—	October 24, 2005	Anderson Mesa	LONEOS	V	730 m	MPC · JPL
391063	2005 UT_{59}	—	October 25, 2005	Kitt Peak	Spacewatch	·	960 m	MPC · JPL
391064	2005 UW_{71}	—	October 23, 2005	Catalina	CSS	LIX	5.1 km	MPC · JPL
391065	2005 UN_{85}	—	October 22, 2005	Kitt Peak	Spacewatch	(8737)	2.9 km	MPC · JPL
391066	2005 UP_{85}	—	October 22, 2005	Kitt Peak	Spacewatch	(2076)	770 m	MPC · JPL
391067	2005 UO_{87}	—	October 22, 2005	Kitt Peak	Spacewatch	·	3.3 km	MPC · JPL
391068	2005 UZ_{103}	—	October 22, 2005	Kitt Peak	Spacewatch	·	1.1 km	MPC · JPL
391069	2005 UT_{104}	—	October 22, 2005	Kitt Peak	Spacewatch	·	1.0 km	MPC · JPL
391070	2005 UG_{107}	—	October 22, 2005	Kitt Peak	Spacewatch	MAS	770 m	MPC · JPL
391071	2005 UE_{108}	—	October 22, 2005	Kitt Peak	Spacewatch	EUP	5.2 km	MPC · JPL
391072	2005 UP_{111}	—	October 22, 2005	Kitt Peak	Spacewatch	·	1.2 km	MPC · JPL
391073	2005 UH_{116}	—	October 23, 2005	Catalina	CSS	·	1.3 km	MPC · JPL
391074	2005 UY_{121}	—	October 5, 2005	Kitt Peak	Spacewatch	·	1.5 km	MPC · JPL
391075	2005 UZ_{134}	—	October 25, 2005	Mount Lemmon	Mount Lemmon Survey	·	2.8 km	MPC · JPL
391076	2005 UZ_{139}	—	October 25, 2005	Mount Lemmon	Mount Lemmon Survey	VER	2.6 km	MPC · JPL
391077	2005 UQ_{155}	—	October 26, 2005	Anderson Mesa	LONEOS	·	1.1 km	MPC · JPL
391078	2005 US_{162}	—	October 22, 2005	Kitt Peak	Spacewatch	·	830 m	MPC · JPL
391079	2005 UH_{177}	—	October 24, 2005	Kitt Peak	Spacewatch	·	820 m	MPC · JPL
391080	2005 UQ_{191}	—	October 27, 2005	Mount Lemmon	Mount Lemmon Survey	·	810 m	MPC · JPL
391081	2005 UH_{208}	—	October 1, 2005	Mount Lemmon	Mount Lemmon Survey	·	2.0 km	MPC · JPL
391082	2005 UT_{213}	—	October 22, 2005	Palomar	NEAT	·	4.0 km	MPC · JPL
391083	2005 UE_{219}	—	October 25, 2005	Kitt Peak	Spacewatch	·	810 m	MPC · JPL
391084	2005 UD_{230}	—	October 25, 2005	Kitt Peak	Spacewatch	·	2.9 km	MPC · JPL
391085	2005 UU_{236}	—	October 25, 2005	Kitt Peak	Spacewatch	·	770 m	MPC · JPL
391086	2005 UX_{237}	—	October 25, 2005	Kitt Peak	Spacewatch	V	660 m	MPC · JPL
391087	2005 UQ_{263}	—	October 27, 2005	Kitt Peak	Spacewatch	·	1.7 km	MPC · JPL
391088	2005 UV_{274}	—	October 5, 2005	Kitt Peak	Spacewatch	·	1.0 km	MPC · JPL
391089	2005 UN_{276}	—	October 24, 2005	Kitt Peak	Spacewatch	·	3.7 km	MPC · JPL
391090	2005 UK_{300}	—	October 26, 2005	Kitt Peak	Spacewatch	·	4.9 km	MPC · JPL
391091	2005 UC_{310}	—	October 28, 2005	Mount Lemmon	Mount Lemmon Survey	HYG	3.2 km	MPC · JPL
391092	2005 UG_{310}	—	October 29, 2005	Mount Lemmon	Mount Lemmon Survey	·	2.4 km	MPC · JPL
391093	2005 UO_{310}	—	October 29, 2005	Kitt Peak	Spacewatch	·	3.2 km	MPC · JPL
391094	2005 UO_{324}	—	October 29, 2005	Kitt Peak	Spacewatch	V	620 m	MPC · JPL
391095	2005 UQ_{355}	—	October 29, 2005	Mount Lemmon	Mount Lemmon Survey	NYS	1.0 km	MPC · JPL
391096	2005 UE_{358}	—	October 7, 2005	Kitt Peak	Spacewatch	·	2.5 km	MPC · JPL
391097	2005 UT_{364}	—	October 27, 2005	Kitt Peak	Spacewatch	·	3.8 km	MPC · JPL
391098	2005 UF_{367}	—	October 22, 2005	Kitt Peak	Spacewatch	·	940 m	MPC · JPL
391099	2005 UC_{389}	—	October 28, 2005	Mount Lemmon	Mount Lemmon Survey	PHO	1.0 km	MPC · JPL
391100	2005 UT_{393}	—	October 28, 2005	Socorro	LINEAR	·	2.2 km	MPC · JPL

== 391101–391200 ==
back to top

Designation			Discovery			Properties		Ref
Permanent	Provisional	Named after	Date	Site	Discoverer(s)	Category	Diam.	Ref
391101	2005 UG_{406}	—	October 30, 2005	Kitt Peak	Spacewatch	·	3.1 km	MPC · JPL
391102	2005 UQ_{407}	—	October 30, 2005	Mount Lemmon	Mount Lemmon Survey	·	4.5 km	MPC · JPL
391103	2005 UA_{436}	—	October 30, 2005	Kitt Peak	Spacewatch	·	5.3 km	MPC · JPL
391104	2005 UX_{443}	—	August 30, 2005	Kitt Peak	Spacewatch	ERI	1.5 km	MPC · JPL
391105	2005 UU_{459}	—	October 27, 2005	Mount Lemmon	Mount Lemmon Survey	TIR	3.5 km	MPC · JPL
391106	2005 UK_{475}	—	October 22, 2005	Kitt Peak	Spacewatch	URS	3.2 km	MPC · JPL
391107	2005 UO_{478}	—	October 27, 2005	Mount Lemmon	Mount Lemmon Survey	·	4.0 km	MPC · JPL
391108	2005 UU_{514}	—	October 20, 2005	Apache Point	A. C. Becker	·	3.9 km	MPC · JPL
391109	2005 UZ_{516}	—	October 25, 2005	Apache Point	A. C. Becker	V	500 m	MPC · JPL
391110	2005 VT_{20}	—	November 1, 2005	Kitt Peak	Spacewatch	·	5.1 km	MPC · JPL
391111	2005 VK_{31}	—	November 4, 2005	Kitt Peak	Spacewatch	V	860 m	MPC · JPL
391112	2005 VR_{32}	—	October 25, 2005	Mount Lemmon	Mount Lemmon Survey	V	630 m	MPC · JPL
391113	2005 VX_{37}	—	November 3, 2005	Mount Lemmon	Mount Lemmon Survey	·	1.1 km	MPC · JPL
391114	2005 VL_{41}	—	November 4, 2005	Mount Lemmon	Mount Lemmon Survey	NYS	1.0 km	MPC · JPL
391115	2005 VL_{50}	—	November 2, 2005	Kitt Peak	Spacewatch	·	4.6 km	MPC · JPL
391116	2005 VV_{54}	—	November 4, 2005	Kitt Peak	Spacewatch	·	1.0 km	MPC · JPL
391117	2005 VS_{70}	—	November 1, 2005	Mount Lemmon	Mount Lemmon Survey	·	1.3 km	MPC · JPL
391118	2005 VM_{102}	—	November 1, 2005	Kitt Peak	Spacewatch	·	3.6 km	MPC · JPL
391119	2005 VP_{129}	—	November 1, 2005	Apache Point	A. C. Becker	·	1.1 km	MPC · JPL
391120	2005 WQ_{10}	—	November 22, 2005	Kitt Peak	Spacewatch	·	830 m	MPC · JPL
391121	2005 WP_{17}	—	November 22, 2005	Kitt Peak	Spacewatch	·	3.7 km	MPC · JPL
391122	2005 WY_{17}	—	November 22, 2005	Kitt Peak	Spacewatch	·	1.0 km	MPC · JPL
391123	2005 WS_{19}	—	November 21, 2005	Kitt Peak	Spacewatch	·	2.5 km	MPC · JPL
391124	2005 WX_{24}	—	November 21, 2005	Kitt Peak	Spacewatch	·	1.1 km	MPC · JPL
391125	2005 WY_{31}	—	November 21, 2005	Kitt Peak	Spacewatch	V	730 m	MPC · JPL
391126	2005 WQ_{47}	—	November 25, 2005	Kitt Peak	Spacewatch	·	3.5 km	MPC · JPL
391127	2005 WO_{48}	—	November 25, 2005	Kitt Peak	Spacewatch	·	1.2 km	MPC · JPL
391128	2005 WE_{71}	—	November 21, 2005	Kitt Peak	Spacewatch	V	720 m	MPC · JPL
391129	2005 WH_{79}	—	November 25, 2005	Kitt Peak	Spacewatch	MAS	640 m	MPC · JPL
391130	2005 WX_{139}	—	November 26, 2005	Mount Lemmon	Mount Lemmon Survey	NYS	1.2 km	MPC · JPL
391131	2005 WM_{194}	—	November 29, 2005	Catalina	CSS	·	1.9 km	MPC · JPL
391132	2005 XT_{3}	—	December 1, 2005	Mount Lemmon	Mount Lemmon Survey	·	1.2 km	MPC · JPL
391133	2005 XN_{12}	—	December 1, 2005	Socorro	LINEAR	V	700 m	MPC · JPL
391134	2005 XO_{40}	—	December 5, 2005	Kitt Peak	Spacewatch	·	1.7 km	MPC · JPL
391135	2005 XM_{51}	—	December 2, 2005	Kitt Peak	Spacewatch	·	1.8 km	MPC · JPL
391136	2005 XF_{73}	—	December 6, 2005	Kitt Peak	Spacewatch	·	1.0 km	MPC · JPL
391137	2005 XH_{80}	—	December 4, 2005	Mount Lemmon	Mount Lemmon Survey	(2076)	1.0 km	MPC · JPL
391138	2005 YR	—	November 10, 2005	Mount Lemmon	Mount Lemmon Survey	H	590 m	MPC · JPL
391139	2005 YW_{8}	—	December 7, 2005	Kitt Peak	Spacewatch	·	1.3 km	MPC · JPL
391140	2005 YK_{11}	—	December 21, 2005	Kitt Peak	Spacewatch	MAS	630 m	MPC · JPL
391141	2005 YH_{14}	—	December 22, 2005	Kitt Peak	Spacewatch	NYS	1.4 km	MPC · JPL
391142	2005 YM_{46}	—	December 25, 2005	Kitt Peak	Spacewatch	·	1.2 km	MPC · JPL
391143	2005 YN_{57}	—	December 24, 2005	Kitt Peak	Spacewatch	·	1.0 km	MPC · JPL
391144	2005 YB_{62}	—	December 24, 2005	Kitt Peak	Spacewatch	MAS	850 m	MPC · JPL
391145	2005 YA_{64}	—	December 24, 2005	Kitt Peak	Spacewatch	·	1.0 km	MPC · JPL
391146	2005 YF_{67}	—	December 5, 2005	Mount Lemmon	Mount Lemmon Survey	·	1.2 km	MPC · JPL
391147	2005 YH_{81}	—	December 24, 2005	Kitt Peak	Spacewatch	·	1.1 km	MPC · JPL
391148	2005 YF_{84}	—	December 24, 2005	Kitt Peak	Spacewatch	·	1 km	MPC · JPL
391149	2005 YU_{85}	—	December 25, 2005	Mount Lemmon	Mount Lemmon Survey	·	1.2 km	MPC · JPL
391150	2005 YS_{87}	—	December 25, 2005	Mount Lemmon	Mount Lemmon Survey	·	1 km	MPC · JPL
391151	2005 YY_{93}	—	December 29, 2005	Socorro	LINEAR	T_{j} (2.62) · APO +1km	1.7 km	MPC · JPL
391152	2005 YZ_{93}	—	December 24, 2005	Socorro	LINEAR	H	720 m	MPC · JPL
391153	2005 YR_{95}	—	December 25, 2005	Kitt Peak	Spacewatch	CYB	5.1 km	MPC · JPL
391154	2005 YJ_{105}	—	December 25, 2005	Kitt Peak	Spacewatch	·	1.0 km	MPC · JPL
391155	2005 YT_{109}	—	December 25, 2005	Kitt Peak	Spacewatch	NYS	880 m	MPC · JPL
391156	2005 YD_{112}	—	December 25, 2005	Mount Lemmon	Mount Lemmon Survey	MAS	720 m	MPC · JPL
391157	2005 YZ_{137}	—	December 26, 2005	Kitt Peak	Spacewatch	·	1.5 km	MPC · JPL
391158	2005 YW_{143}	—	December 28, 2005	Mount Lemmon	Mount Lemmon Survey	MAS	770 m	MPC · JPL
391159	2005 YT_{165}	—	December 30, 2005	Socorro	LINEAR	·	1.9 km	MPC · JPL
391160	2005 YW_{191}	—	December 30, 2005	Kitt Peak	Spacewatch	·	1.1 km	MPC · JPL
391161	2005 YB_{199}	—	December 25, 2005	Kitt Peak	Spacewatch	·	1.4 km	MPC · JPL
391162	2005 YZ_{202}	—	October 29, 2005	Mount Lemmon	Mount Lemmon Survey	·	1.2 km	MPC · JPL
391163	2005 YQ_{228}	—	December 25, 2005	Kitt Peak	Spacewatch	CYB	3.9 km	MPC · JPL
391164	2005 YE_{285}	—	December 29, 2005	Mount Lemmon	Mount Lemmon Survey	PHO	2.0 km	MPC · JPL
391165	2006 AB_{25}	—	January 5, 2006	Kitt Peak	Spacewatch	·	1.1 km	MPC · JPL
391166	2006 AY_{25}	—	January 5, 2006	Kitt Peak	Spacewatch	·	1.2 km	MPC · JPL
391167	2006 AL_{26}	—	January 5, 2006	Kitt Peak	Spacewatch	MAS	770 m	MPC · JPL
391168	2006 AW_{39}	—	January 7, 2006	Mount Lemmon	Mount Lemmon Survey	·	1.2 km	MPC · JPL
391169	2006 AB_{41}	—	January 7, 2006	Kitt Peak	Spacewatch	NYS	1.0 km	MPC · JPL
391170	2006 AW_{47}	—	January 7, 2006	Kitt Peak	Spacewatch	NYS	1.3 km	MPC · JPL
391171	2006 AU_{56}	—	December 28, 2005	Kitt Peak	Spacewatch	MAS	590 m	MPC · JPL
391172	2006 AO_{60}	—	January 5, 2006	Kitt Peak	Spacewatch	·	1.2 km	MPC · JPL
391173	2006 AL_{69}	—	January 6, 2006	Mount Lemmon	Mount Lemmon Survey	·	1.5 km	MPC · JPL
391174	2006 AN_{69}	—	February 5, 1995	Kitt Peak	Spacewatch	·	1.2 km	MPC · JPL
391175	2006 BN_{3}	—	December 27, 2005	Kitt Peak	Spacewatch	·	1.4 km	MPC · JPL
391176	2006 BS_{98}	—	January 21, 2006	Anderson Mesa	LONEOS	H	600 m	MPC · JPL
391177	2006 BT_{114}	—	January 26, 2006	Kitt Peak	Spacewatch	·	1.4 km	MPC · JPL
391178	2006 BS_{136}	—	January 28, 2006	Mount Lemmon	Mount Lemmon Survey	·	1.2 km	MPC · JPL
391179	2006 BC_{145}	—	January 8, 1998	Kitt Peak	Spacewatch	H	600 m	MPC · JPL
391180	2006 BO_{165}	—	January 26, 2006	Mount Lemmon	Mount Lemmon Survey	·	1.1 km	MPC · JPL
391181	2006 BH_{178}	—	January 27, 2006	Mount Lemmon	Mount Lemmon Survey	·	1.2 km	MPC · JPL
391182	2006 BT_{192}	—	January 30, 2006	Kitt Peak	Spacewatch	·	1.1 km	MPC · JPL
391183	2006 BA_{193}	—	January 30, 2006	Kitt Peak	Spacewatch	·	1.1 km	MPC · JPL
391184	2006 BK_{203}	—	January 31, 2006	Kitt Peak	Spacewatch	MAS	810 m	MPC · JPL
391185	2006 BR_{216}	—	January 26, 2006	Anderson Mesa	LONEOS	H	680 m	MPC · JPL
391186	2006 BA_{226}	—	January 30, 2006	Kitt Peak	Spacewatch	·	1.1 km	MPC · JPL
391187	2006 BU_{234}	—	January 31, 2006	Kitt Peak	Spacewatch	NYS	1.3 km	MPC · JPL
391188	2006 BE_{263}	—	January 21, 2006	Kitt Peak	Spacewatch	·	1.5 km	MPC · JPL
391189	2006 CL_{16}	—	January 9, 2006	Kitt Peak	Spacewatch	·	1.9 km	MPC · JPL
391190	2006 DO_{9}	—	February 21, 2006	Catalina	CSS	·	1.3 km	MPC · JPL
391191	2006 DD_{50}	—	February 22, 2006	Catalina	CSS	·	1.9 km	MPC · JPL
391192	2006 DM_{72}	—	February 22, 2006	Kitt Peak	Spacewatch	MAS	800 m	MPC · JPL
391193	2006 DB_{87}	—	February 24, 2006	Kitt Peak	Spacewatch	·	1.8 km	MPC · JPL
391194	2006 DS_{125}	—	February 2, 2006	Mount Lemmon	Mount Lemmon Survey	·	1.2 km	MPC · JPL
391195	2006 EC_{53}	—	March 2, 2006	Kitt Peak	Spacewatch	·	1.7 km	MPC · JPL
391196	2006 EU_{65}	—	March 5, 2006	Kitt Peak	Spacewatch	·	1.2 km	MPC · JPL
391197	2006 FX_{11}	—	March 23, 2006	Kitt Peak	Spacewatch	·	1.1 km	MPC · JPL
391198	2006 FC_{25}	—	March 24, 2006	Kitt Peak	Spacewatch	·	1.4 km	MPC · JPL
391199	2006 FX_{50}	—	March 23, 2006	Catalina	CSS	H	730 m	MPC · JPL
391200	2006 GH_{12}	—	April 2, 2006	Kitt Peak	Spacewatch	·	1.3 km	MPC · JPL

== 391201–391300 ==
back to top

Designation			Discovery			Properties		Ref
Permanent	Provisional	Named after	Date	Site	Discoverer(s)	Category	Diam.	Ref
391201	2006 GZ_{13}	—	April 2, 2006	Kitt Peak	Spacewatch	·	1.1 km	MPC · JPL
391202	2006 GF_{26}	—	April 2, 2006	Kitt Peak	Spacewatch	KON	1.8 km	MPC · JPL
391203	2006 GN_{36}	—	April 8, 2006	Kitt Peak	Spacewatch	·	1.1 km	MPC · JPL
391204	2006 HA_{25}	—	April 20, 2006	Kitt Peak	Spacewatch	H	590 m	MPC · JPL
391205	2006 HL_{39}	—	April 21, 2006	Kitt Peak	Spacewatch	·	1.2 km	MPC · JPL
391206	2006 HD_{40}	—	April 21, 2006	Kitt Peak	Spacewatch	·	1.9 km	MPC · JPL
391207	2006 HR_{43}	—	April 24, 2006	Mount Lemmon	Mount Lemmon Survey	(5)	1.1 km	MPC · JPL
391208	2006 HV_{47}	—	April 24, 2006	Kitt Peak	Spacewatch	(5)	1.3 km	MPC · JPL
391209	2006 HD_{48}	—	April 24, 2006	Kitt Peak	Spacewatch	·	910 m	MPC · JPL
391210	2006 HA_{51}	—	April 26, 2006	Saint-Sulpice	B. Christophe	3:2	7.2 km	MPC · JPL
391211	2006 HZ_{51}	—	April 27, 2006	Catalina	CSS	AMO · PHA	410 m	MPC · JPL
391212	2006 HQ_{68}	—	April 24, 2006	Mount Lemmon	Mount Lemmon Survey	·	1.2 km	MPC · JPL
391213	2006 HN_{72}	—	April 25, 2006	Kitt Peak	Spacewatch	·	1.4 km	MPC · JPL
391214	2006 HF_{75}	—	April 25, 2006	Kitt Peak	Spacewatch	KON	2.3 km	MPC · JPL
391215	2006 HN_{89}	—	April 20, 2006	Siding Spring	SSS	·	3.1 km	MPC · JPL
391216	2006 HF_{92}	—	April 21, 2006	Kitt Peak	Spacewatch	·	2.2 km	MPC · JPL
391217	2006 HR_{92}	—	April 29, 2006	Kitt Peak	Spacewatch	·	1.0 km	MPC · JPL
391218	2006 HY_{96}	—	April 30, 2006	Kitt Peak	Spacewatch	·	4.2 km	MPC · JPL
391219	2006 HZ_{117}	—	April 29, 2006	Kitt Peak	Spacewatch	(194)	1.5 km	MPC · JPL
391220	2006 HK_{120}	—	April 30, 2006	Kitt Peak	Spacewatch	EUN	1.2 km	MPC · JPL
391221	2006 HP_{147}	—	April 27, 2006	Cerro Tololo	M. W. Buie	·	1.4 km	MPC · JPL
391222	2006 JL_{1}	—	April 24, 2006	Kitt Peak	Spacewatch	·	1.4 km	MPC · JPL
391223	2006 JH_{8}	—	May 1, 2006	Kitt Peak	Spacewatch	·	1.3 km	MPC · JPL
391224	2006 JH_{16}	—	January 16, 2005	Kitt Peak	Spacewatch	·	1.3 km	MPC · JPL
391225	2006 JO_{20}	—	April 24, 2006	Kitt Peak	Spacewatch	·	1.3 km	MPC · JPL
391226	2006 JQ_{32}	—	May 3, 2006	Kitt Peak	Spacewatch	·	1.8 km	MPC · JPL
391227	2006 JJ_{35}	—	May 4, 2006	Kitt Peak	Spacewatch	H	610 m	MPC · JPL
391228	2006 JZ_{56}	—	May 10, 2006	Palomar	NEAT	·	1.6 km	MPC · JPL
391229	2006 JB_{81}	—	May 9, 2006	Mount Lemmon	Mount Lemmon Survey	·	2.5 km	MPC · JPL
391230	2006 KY	—	May 18, 2006	Palomar	NEAT	·	2.7 km	MPC · JPL
391231	2006 KS_{6}	—	May 19, 2006	Mount Lemmon	Mount Lemmon Survey	·	1.6 km	MPC · JPL
391232	2006 KN_{13}	—	May 20, 2006	Kitt Peak	Spacewatch	·	1.1 km	MPC · JPL
391233	2006 KR_{44}	—	May 21, 2006	Kitt Peak	Spacewatch	MAR	1.3 km	MPC · JPL
391234	2006 KL_{58}	—	May 22, 2006	Kitt Peak	Spacewatch	·	1.1 km	MPC · JPL
391235	2006 KP_{66}	—	May 24, 2006	Kitt Peak	Spacewatch	·	1.5 km	MPC · JPL
391236	2006 KT_{80}	—	May 25, 2006	Mount Lemmon	Mount Lemmon Survey	·	1.7 km	MPC · JPL
391237	2006 KJ_{98}	—	May 26, 2006	Kitt Peak	Spacewatch	·	1.8 km	MPC · JPL
391238	2006 KP_{112}	—	May 31, 2006	Mount Lemmon	Mount Lemmon Survey	·	2.6 km	MPC · JPL
391239	2006 KE_{118}	—	May 23, 2006	Catalina	CSS	·	2.5 km	MPC · JPL
391240	2006 KP_{134}	—	May 25, 2006	Mauna Kea	P. A. Wiegert	·	1.4 km	MPC · JPL
391241	2006 OG_{6}	—	June 22, 2006	Kitt Peak	Spacewatch	HOF	2.8 km	MPC · JPL
391242	2006 PL_{4}	—	August 12, 2006	Palomar	NEAT	·	1.5 km	MPC · JPL
391243	2006 PF_{13}	—	August 14, 2006	Siding Spring	SSS	BAR	1.4 km	MPC · JPL
391244	2006 QE_{2}	—	August 17, 2006	Palomar	NEAT	·	2.5 km	MPC · JPL
391245	2006 QK_{8}	—	August 19, 2006	Kitt Peak	Spacewatch	AGN	1.2 km	MPC · JPL
391246	2006 QA_{9}	—	August 19, 2006	Kitt Peak	Spacewatch	·	3.4 km	MPC · JPL
391247	2006 QC_{70}	—	August 21, 2006	Kitt Peak	Spacewatch	MRX	1.0 km	MPC · JPL
391248	2006 QZ_{74}	—	August 21, 2006	Kitt Peak	Spacewatch	·	1.9 km	MPC · JPL
391249	2006 QD_{84}	—	August 19, 2006	Kitt Peak	Spacewatch	EMA	3.0 km	MPC · JPL
391250	2006 QX_{96}	—	August 16, 2006	Palomar	NEAT	EUN	1.4 km	MPC · JPL
391251	2006 QM_{114}	—	August 27, 2006	Anderson Mesa	LONEOS	·	2.4 km	MPC · JPL
391252	2006 QM_{119}	—	August 28, 2006	Socorro	LINEAR	(1547)	1.8 km	MPC · JPL
391253	2006 QA_{129}	—	March 8, 2005	Mount Lemmon	Mount Lemmon Survey	·	1.9 km	MPC · JPL
391254	2006 QO_{150}	—	August 19, 2006	Kitt Peak	Spacewatch	KOR	1.4 km	MPC · JPL
391255	2006 QH_{165}	—	August 29, 2006	Catalina	CSS	·	1.8 km	MPC · JPL
391256	2006 QR_{166}	—	August 29, 2006	Anderson Mesa	LONEOS	·	1.6 km	MPC · JPL
391257 Wilwheaton	2006 RL_{1}	Wilwheaton	September 12, 2006	Uccle	T. Pauwels	(1547)	1.7 km	MPC · JPL
391258	2006 RP_{33}	—	September 12, 2006	Socorro	LINEAR	·	3.3 km	MPC · JPL
391259	2006 RF_{48}	—	September 14, 2006	Catalina	CSS	·	3.2 km	MPC · JPL
391260	2006 RZ_{54}	—	September 14, 2006	Kitt Peak	Spacewatch	·	1.8 km	MPC · JPL
391261	2006 RA_{63}	—	September 14, 2006	Catalina	CSS	·	2.8 km	MPC · JPL
391262	2006 RR_{77}	—	September 15, 2006	Kitt Peak	Spacewatch	KOR	1.3 km	MPC · JPL
391263	2006 RW_{79}	—	September 15, 2006	Kitt Peak	Spacewatch	·	3.0 km	MPC · JPL
391264	2006 RS_{120}	—	September 15, 2006	Kitt Peak	Spacewatch	·	2.1 km	MPC · JPL
391265	2006 SC_{17}	—	September 17, 2006	Kitt Peak	Spacewatch	·	1.3 km	MPC · JPL
391266	2006 SV_{22}	—	September 17, 2006	Anderson Mesa	LONEOS	·	3.1 km	MPC · JPL
391267	2006 SE_{43}	—	September 18, 2006	Kitt Peak	Spacewatch	·	1.6 km	MPC · JPL
391268	2006 SH_{60}	—	September 18, 2006	Catalina	CSS	·	3.9 km	MPC · JPL
391269	2006 SN_{82}	—	September 18, 2006	Anderson Mesa	LONEOS	·	3.6 km	MPC · JPL
391270	2006 SL_{90}	—	September 18, 2006	Kitt Peak	Spacewatch	·	4.7 km	MPC · JPL
391271	2006 SS_{96}	—	September 18, 2006	Kitt Peak	Spacewatch	BRA	2.5 km	MPC · JPL
391272	2006 SL_{112}	—	August 18, 2006	Kitt Peak	Spacewatch	EOS	1.6 km	MPC · JPL
391273	2006 SV_{118}	—	September 24, 2006	Kitt Peak	Spacewatch	EOS	2.0 km	MPC · JPL
391274	2006 SW_{130}	—	September 15, 2006	Kitt Peak	Spacewatch	EOS	1.7 km	MPC · JPL
391275	2006 SJ_{134}	—	September 26, 2006	Siding Spring	SSS	AMO +1km	910 m	MPC · JPL
391276	2006 SJ_{146}	—	September 19, 2006	Kitt Peak	Spacewatch	HYG	2.2 km	MPC · JPL
391277	2006 SL_{148}	—	September 19, 2006	Kitt Peak	Spacewatch	·	2.4 km	MPC · JPL
391278	2006 SU_{150}	—	September 19, 2006	Kitt Peak	Spacewatch	DOR	2.0 km	MPC · JPL
391279	2006 SA_{165}	—	September 17, 2006	Catalina	CSS	·	2.8 km	MPC · JPL
391280	2006 SL_{168}	—	September 25, 2006	Kitt Peak	Spacewatch	·	1.7 km	MPC · JPL
391281	2006 SR_{171}	—	September 17, 2006	Kitt Peak	Spacewatch	·	1.7 km	MPC · JPL
391282	2006 SV_{179}	—	September 25, 2006	Kitt Peak	Spacewatch	·	2.5 km	MPC · JPL
391283	2006 ST_{188}	—	September 26, 2006	Catalina	CSS	·	2.6 km	MPC · JPL
391284	2006 SM_{194}	—	September 26, 2006	Kitt Peak	Spacewatch	·	2.5 km	MPC · JPL
391285	2006 SQ_{219}	—	September 23, 2006	Kitt Peak	Spacewatch	·	2.8 km	MPC · JPL
391286	2006 SF_{229}	—	September 26, 2006	Kitt Peak	Spacewatch	·	2.0 km	MPC · JPL
391287	2006 SH_{230}	—	September 26, 2006	Socorro	LINEAR	·	1.8 km	MPC · JPL
391288	2006 SB_{231}	—	September 17, 2006	Kitt Peak	Spacewatch	URS	2.6 km	MPC · JPL
391289	2006 SP_{260}	—	September 26, 2006	Mount Lemmon	Mount Lemmon Survey	·	1.7 km	MPC · JPL
391290	2006 SB_{265}	—	September 26, 2006	Kitt Peak	Spacewatch	·	2.0 km	MPC · JPL
391291	2006 SB_{269}	—	September 26, 2006	Kitt Peak	Spacewatch	·	2.6 km	MPC · JPL
391292	2006 SP_{293}	—	September 25, 2006	Kitt Peak	Spacewatch	·	1.8 km	MPC · JPL
391293	2006 SD_{298}	—	September 25, 2006	Mount Lemmon	Mount Lemmon Survey	·	2.5 km	MPC · JPL
391294	2006 SB_{300}	—	September 18, 2006	Anderson Mesa	LONEOS	·	4.4 km	MPC · JPL
391295	2006 SD_{303}	—	April 19, 2004	Kitt Peak	Spacewatch	·	2.0 km	MPC · JPL
391296	2006 SZ_{309}	—	September 27, 2006	Kitt Peak	Spacewatch	·	2.8 km	MPC · JPL
391297	2006 SA_{317}	—	September 27, 2006	Kitt Peak	Spacewatch	·	2.3 km	MPC · JPL
391298	2006 SU_{321}	—	April 11, 2003	Kitt Peak	Spacewatch	EUP	3.7 km	MPC · JPL
391299	2006 SF_{325}	—	September 19, 2006	Kitt Peak	Spacewatch	·	2.6 km	MPC · JPL
391300	2006 SH_{360}	—	September 30, 2006	Mount Lemmon	Mount Lemmon Survey	·	2.7 km	MPC · JPL

== 391301–391400 ==
back to top

Designation			Discovery			Properties		Ref
Permanent	Provisional	Named after	Date	Site	Discoverer(s)	Category	Diam.	Ref
391301	2006 SP_{375}	—	September 17, 2006	Apache Point	A. C. Becker	·	1.7 km	MPC · JPL
391302	2006 SJ_{378}	—	September 18, 2006	Apache Point	A. C. Becker	EOS	1.9 km	MPC · JPL
391303	2006 SQ_{379}	—	September 20, 2006	Apache Point	A. C. Becker	·	1.5 km	MPC · JPL
391304	2006 SV_{384}	—	September 29, 2006	Apache Point	A. C. Becker	·	2.5 km	MPC · JPL
391305	2006 SJ_{385}	—	September 29, 2006	Apache Point	A. C. Becker	EOS	2.1 km	MPC · JPL
391306	2006 ST_{401}	—	September 30, 2006	Mount Lemmon	Mount Lemmon Survey	·	2.6 km	MPC · JPL
391307	2006 SK_{402}	—	September 25, 2006	Mount Lemmon	Mount Lemmon Survey	EOS	1.7 km	MPC · JPL
391308	2006 SS_{409}	—	September 18, 2006	Kitt Peak	Spacewatch	·	640 m	MPC · JPL
391309	2006 TN_{16}	—	September 18, 2006	Kitt Peak	Spacewatch	·	2.4 km	MPC · JPL
391310	2006 TM_{25}	—	September 25, 2006	Mount Lemmon	Mount Lemmon Survey	·	3.1 km	MPC · JPL
391311	2006 TL_{26}	—	October 4, 2006	Mount Lemmon	Mount Lemmon Survey	·	3.1 km	MPC · JPL
391312	2006 TM_{41}	—	September 25, 2006	Mount Lemmon	Mount Lemmon Survey	·	2.8 km	MPC · JPL
391313	2006 TL_{44}	—	October 12, 2006	Kitt Peak	Spacewatch	·	2.5 km	MPC · JPL
391314	2006 TY_{53}	—	October 12, 2006	Kitt Peak	Spacewatch	·	2.9 km	MPC · JPL
391315	2006 TT_{69}	—	October 11, 2006	Palomar	NEAT	·	3.0 km	MPC · JPL
391316	2006 TD_{76}	—	October 11, 2006	Palomar	NEAT	PHO	780 m	MPC · JPL
391317	2006 TN_{80}	—	October 13, 2006	Kitt Peak	Spacewatch	·	500 m	MPC · JPL
391318	2006 TB_{82}	—	October 13, 2006	Kitt Peak	Spacewatch	·	3.1 km	MPC · JPL
391319	2006 TX_{82}	—	October 13, 2006	Kitt Peak	Spacewatch	·	4.2 km	MPC · JPL
391320	2006 TS_{83}	—	October 13, 2006	Kitt Peak	Spacewatch	(31811)	3.0 km	MPC · JPL
391321	2006 TD_{86}	—	October 13, 2006	Kitt Peak	Spacewatch	·	3.1 km	MPC · JPL
391322	2006 TJ_{87}	—	October 2, 2006	Mount Lemmon	Mount Lemmon Survey	·	2.4 km	MPC · JPL
391323	2006 TL_{101}	—	October 15, 2006	Kitt Peak	Spacewatch	·	520 m	MPC · JPL
391324	2006 TC_{103}	—	October 15, 2006	Kitt Peak	Spacewatch	TEL	1.5 km	MPC · JPL
391325	2006 TY_{108}	—	October 2, 2006	Kitt Peak	Spacewatch	EOS	1.8 km	MPC · JPL
391326	2006 TC_{115}	—	October 1, 2006	Apache Point	A. C. Becker	LIX	3.1 km	MPC · JPL
391327	2006 TG_{116}	—	October 2, 2006	Apache Point	A. C. Becker	·	2.6 km	MPC · JPL
391328	2006 TB_{120}	—	October 12, 2006	Apache Point	A. C. Becker	EOS	1.4 km	MPC · JPL
391329	2006 TM_{120}	—	October 12, 2006	Apache Point	A. C. Becker	·	2.2 km	MPC · JPL
391330	2006 TA_{126}	—	October 2, 2006	Mount Lemmon	Mount Lemmon Survey	·	3.6 km	MPC · JPL
391331	2006 UY_{5}	—	October 16, 2006	Kitt Peak	Spacewatch	·	1.8 km	MPC · JPL
391332	2006 UP_{12}	—	October 2, 2006	Mount Lemmon	Mount Lemmon Survey	·	3.4 km	MPC · JPL
391333	2006 UH_{15}	—	October 17, 2006	Mount Lemmon	Mount Lemmon Survey	EUP	4.3 km	MPC · JPL
391334	2006 UW_{18}	—	October 16, 2006	Kitt Peak	Spacewatch	HYG	1.9 km	MPC · JPL
391335	2006 UZ_{29}	—	October 16, 2006	Kitt Peak	Spacewatch	·	2.7 km	MPC · JPL
391336	2006 UU_{45}	—	October 16, 2006	Kitt Peak	Spacewatch	EOS	1.7 km	MPC · JPL
391337	2006 UH_{65}	—	September 25, 2006	Kitt Peak	Spacewatch	EOS	1.6 km	MPC · JPL
391338	2006 UB_{79}	—	October 17, 2006	Kitt Peak	Spacewatch	·	3.3 km	MPC · JPL
391339	2006 UV_{87}	—	October 17, 2006	Mount Lemmon	Mount Lemmon Survey	·	1.4 km	MPC · JPL
391340	2006 UE_{92}	—	October 18, 2006	Kitt Peak	Spacewatch	·	2.2 km	MPC · JPL
391341	2006 UY_{97}	—	October 2, 2006	Mount Lemmon	Mount Lemmon Survey	·	1.9 km	MPC · JPL
391342	2006 UT_{102}	—	October 18, 2006	Kitt Peak	Spacewatch	·	2.7 km	MPC · JPL
391343	2006 UE_{103}	—	October 2, 2006	Mount Lemmon	Mount Lemmon Survey	·	1.8 km	MPC · JPL
391344	2006 UG_{118}	—	September 26, 2006	Mount Lemmon	Mount Lemmon Survey	·	2.0 km	MPC · JPL
391345	2006 US_{118}	—	September 18, 2006	Kitt Peak	Spacewatch	·	2.2 km	MPC · JPL
391346	2006 UO_{157}	—	October 21, 2006	Mount Lemmon	Mount Lemmon Survey	EOS	1.7 km	MPC · JPL
391347	2006 UH_{177}	—	September 17, 1995	Kitt Peak	Spacewatch	EOS	1.9 km	MPC · JPL
391348	2006 UN_{214}	—	October 23, 2006	Kitt Peak	Spacewatch	·	2.9 km	MPC · JPL
391349	2006 UE_{217}	—	October 28, 2006	Las Cruces	Dixon, D. S.	·	2.8 km	MPC · JPL
391350	2006 UG_{222}	—	October 17, 2006	Catalina	CSS	·	2.7 km	MPC · JPL
391351	2006 UP_{226}	—	October 20, 2006	Palomar	NEAT	·	3.5 km	MPC · JPL
391352	2006 UY_{228}	—	October 3, 2006	Mount Lemmon	Mount Lemmon Survey	·	3.0 km	MPC · JPL
391353	2006 UB_{256}	—	September 27, 2006	Mount Lemmon	Mount Lemmon Survey	·	3.4 km	MPC · JPL
391354	2006 UC_{257}	—	October 28, 2006	Kitt Peak	Spacewatch	·	2.7 km	MPC · JPL
391355	2006 UJ_{267}	—	October 27, 2006	Mount Lemmon	Mount Lemmon Survey	THM	2.1 km	MPC · JPL
391356	2006 UN_{290}	—	October 18, 2006	Kitt Peak	Spacewatch	·	2.2 km	MPC · JPL
391357	2006 US_{306}	—	September 30, 2006	Mount Lemmon	Mount Lemmon Survey	·	2.3 km	MPC · JPL
391358	2006 UX_{314}	—	October 19, 2006	Kitt Peak	M. W. Buie	·	1.9 km	MPC · JPL
391359	2006 UK_{332}	—	October 21, 2006	Apache Point	A. C. Becker	·	2.7 km	MPC · JPL
391360	2006 UQ_{333}	—	October 22, 2006	Apache Point	A. C. Becker	·	2.4 km	MPC · JPL
391361	2006 VZ_{10}	—	November 11, 2006	Mount Lemmon	Mount Lemmon Survey	·	2.8 km	MPC · JPL
391362	2006 VJ_{11}	—	October 16, 2006	Kitt Peak	Spacewatch	·	2.0 km	MPC · JPL
391363	2006 VF_{36}	—	November 11, 2006	Mount Lemmon	Mount Lemmon Survey	·	3.4 km	MPC · JPL
391364	2006 VG_{53}	—	November 11, 2006	Kitt Peak	Spacewatch	·	3.3 km	MPC · JPL
391365	2006 VL_{57}	—	October 21, 2006	Mount Lemmon	Mount Lemmon Survey	·	3.0 km	MPC · JPL
391366	2006 VV_{71}	—	November 11, 2006	Mount Lemmon	Mount Lemmon Survey	·	3.1 km	MPC · JPL
391367	2006 VM_{105}	—	November 13, 2006	Kitt Peak	Spacewatch	·	2.3 km	MPC · JPL
391368	2006 VN_{122}	—	November 14, 2006	Kitt Peak	Spacewatch	·	3.0 km	MPC · JPL
391369	2006 VO_{130}	—	November 15, 2006	Kitt Peak	Spacewatch	·	2.2 km	MPC · JPL
391370	2006 VO_{131}	—	November 15, 2006	Kitt Peak	Spacewatch	·	2.9 km	MPC · JPL
391371	2006 VM_{170}	—	November 15, 2006	Kitt Peak	Spacewatch	·	2.5 km	MPC · JPL
391372	2006 VQ_{171}	—	November 1, 2006	Kitt Peak	Spacewatch	EOS	2.1 km	MPC · JPL
391373	2006 WJ_{4}	—	November 20, 2006	Great Shefford	Birtwhistle, P.	·	2.4 km	MPC · JPL
391374	2006 WM_{12}	—	November 16, 2006	Kitt Peak	Spacewatch	·	780 m	MPC · JPL
391375	2006 WG_{14}	—	November 16, 2006	Mount Lemmon	Mount Lemmon Survey	EOS	2.0 km	MPC · JPL
391376	2006 WV_{21}	—	November 17, 2006	Mount Lemmon	Mount Lemmon Survey	·	3.4 km	MPC · JPL
391377	2006 WM_{23}	—	November 17, 2006	Mount Lemmon	Mount Lemmon Survey	EOS	2.2 km	MPC · JPL
391378	2006 WC_{44}	—	September 28, 2006	Mount Lemmon	Mount Lemmon Survey	·	2.7 km	MPC · JPL
391379	2006 WP_{62}	—	November 17, 2006	Mount Lemmon	Mount Lemmon Survey	·	2.9 km	MPC · JPL
391380	2006 WY_{94}	—	November 19, 2006	Kitt Peak	Spacewatch	·	2.5 km	MPC · JPL
391381	2006 WO_{97}	—	November 19, 2006	Kitt Peak	Spacewatch	EOS	2.3 km	MPC · JPL
391382	2006 WS_{108}	—	November 11, 2006	Mount Lemmon	Mount Lemmon Survey	·	2.5 km	MPC · JPL
391383	2006 WK_{111}	—	November 19, 2006	Kitt Peak	Spacewatch	·	4.1 km	MPC · JPL
391384	2006 WN_{134}	—	November 18, 2006	Mount Lemmon	Mount Lemmon Survey	·	5.1 km	MPC · JPL
391385	2006 WR_{138}	—	November 19, 2006	Catalina	CSS	·	3.6 km	MPC · JPL
391386	2006 WK_{149}	—	November 20, 2006	Kitt Peak	Spacewatch	VER	3.4 km	MPC · JPL
391387	2006 WJ_{164}	—	November 23, 2006	Kitt Peak	Spacewatch	·	2.4 km	MPC · JPL
391388	2006 WP_{164}	—	October 20, 2006	Mount Lemmon	Mount Lemmon Survey	·	3.3 km	MPC · JPL
391389	2006 WD_{171}	—	October 31, 2006	Mount Lemmon	Mount Lemmon Survey	·	3.1 km	MPC · JPL
391390	2006 WR_{173}	—	November 23, 2006	Mount Lemmon	Mount Lemmon Survey	·	2.8 km	MPC · JPL
391391	2006 WW_{186}	—	November 23, 2006	Mount Lemmon	Mount Lemmon Survey	·	4.4 km	MPC · JPL
391392	2006 XU_{32}	—	November 10, 2006	Kitt Peak	Spacewatch	EOS	2.0 km	MPC · JPL
391393	2006 YG_{22}	—	December 21, 2006	Mount Lemmon	Mount Lemmon Survey	·	3.1 km	MPC · JPL
391394	2007 AW_{22}	—	December 13, 2006	Kitt Peak	Spacewatch	·	3.4 km	MPC · JPL
391395	2007 AY_{22}	—	January 10, 2007	Mount Lemmon	Mount Lemmon Survey	·	710 m	MPC · JPL
391396	2007 BY_{5}	—	January 17, 2007	Palomar	NEAT	·	730 m	MPC · JPL
391397	2007 BW_{8}	—	March 16, 2004	Kitt Peak	Spacewatch	·	710 m	MPC · JPL
391398	2007 BZ_{11}	—	January 17, 2007	Kitt Peak	Spacewatch	·	880 m	MPC · JPL
391399	2007 BH_{20}	—	January 10, 2007	Kitt Peak	Spacewatch	·	810 m	MPC · JPL
391400	2007 BC_{38}	—	April 13, 2004	Kitt Peak	Spacewatch	·	620 m	MPC · JPL

== 391401–391500 ==
back to top

Designation			Discovery			Properties		Ref
Permanent	Provisional	Named after	Date	Site	Discoverer(s)	Category	Diam.	Ref
391401	2007 BK_{65}	—	January 27, 2007	Mount Lemmon	Mount Lemmon Survey	·	630 m	MPC · JPL
391402	2007 CP_{2}	—	February 6, 2007	Kitt Peak	Spacewatch	·	690 m	MPC · JPL
391403	2007 CP_{4}	—	February 6, 2007	Mount Lemmon	Mount Lemmon Survey	·	980 m	MPC · JPL
391404	2007 CA_{22}	—	February 6, 2007	Palomar	NEAT	·	750 m	MPC · JPL
391405	2007 CR_{28}	—	February 6, 2007	Mount Lemmon	Mount Lemmon Survey	·	760 m	MPC · JPL
391406	2007 CG_{45}	—	February 8, 2007	Palomar	NEAT	·	1.0 km	MPC · JPL
391407	2007 CL_{62}	—	February 13, 2007	Socorro	LINEAR	·	770 m	MPC · JPL
391408	2007 DU_{6}	—	February 17, 2007	Mount Lemmon	Mount Lemmon Survey	V	550 m	MPC · JPL
391409	2007 DK_{17}	—	February 17, 2007	Kitt Peak	Spacewatch	·	840 m	MPC · JPL
391410	2007 DS_{19}	—	February 17, 2007	Kitt Peak	Spacewatch	·	710 m	MPC · JPL
391411	2007 DS_{23}	—	February 17, 2007	Kitt Peak	Spacewatch	·	660 m	MPC · JPL
391412	2007 DG_{26}	—	February 17, 2007	Kitt Peak	Spacewatch	·	810 m	MPC · JPL
391413	2007 DB_{29}	—	February 17, 2007	Kitt Peak	Spacewatch	·	630 m	MPC · JPL
391414	2007 DH_{31}	—	February 17, 2007	Kitt Peak	Spacewatch	·	620 m	MPC · JPL
391415	2007 DH_{33}	—	February 17, 2007	Kitt Peak	Spacewatch	·	1.4 km	MPC · JPL
391416	2007 DR_{72}	—	February 21, 2007	Kitt Peak	Spacewatch	V	640 m	MPC · JPL
391417	2007 DE_{76}	—	February 21, 2007	Kitt Peak	Spacewatch	·	2.0 km	MPC · JPL
391418	2007 DJ_{76}	—	February 21, 2007	Kitt Peak	Spacewatch	NYS	1.1 km	MPC · JPL
391419	2007 DY_{86}	—	February 23, 2007	Mount Lemmon	Mount Lemmon Survey	·	660 m	MPC · JPL
391420	2007 DT_{93}	—	February 23, 2007	Kitt Peak	Spacewatch	·	900 m	MPC · JPL
391421	2007 DH_{99}	—	February 25, 2007	Mount Lemmon	Mount Lemmon Survey	·	1.5 km	MPC · JPL
391422	2007 DT_{112}	—	February 26, 2007	Mount Lemmon	Mount Lemmon Survey	MAS	620 m	MPC · JPL
391423	2007 EK_{11}	—	February 8, 2007	Kitt Peak	Spacewatch	·	1.0 km	MPC · JPL
391424	2007 EC_{12}	—	March 9, 2007	Catalina	CSS	·	760 m	MPC · JPL
391425	2007 EH_{25}	—	March 10, 2007	Mount Lemmon	Mount Lemmon Survey	·	770 m	MPC · JPL
391426	2007 EY_{27}	—	March 9, 2007	Catalina	CSS	·	870 m	MPC · JPL
391427	2007 EU_{32}	—	March 10, 2007	Kitt Peak	Spacewatch	·	820 m	MPC · JPL
391428	2007 EP_{43}	—	March 9, 2007	Kitt Peak	Spacewatch	NYS	1.0 km	MPC · JPL
391429	2007 EZ_{54}	—	November 1, 2005	Mount Lemmon	Mount Lemmon Survey	·	940 m	MPC · JPL
391430	2007 EO_{64}	—	March 10, 2007	Mount Lemmon	Mount Lemmon Survey	·	920 m	MPC · JPL
391431	2007 EG_{69}	—	March 10, 2007	Kitt Peak	Spacewatch	·	740 m	MPC · JPL
391432	2007 EL_{70}	—	March 10, 2007	Kitt Peak	Spacewatch	·	760 m	MPC · JPL
391433	2007 ED_{71}	—	March 10, 2007	Kitt Peak	Spacewatch	·	880 m	MPC · JPL
391434	2007 ER_{92}	—	March 10, 2007	Mount Lemmon	Mount Lemmon Survey	·	690 m	MPC · JPL
391435	2007 ER_{99}	—	March 11, 2007	Kitt Peak	Spacewatch	·	660 m	MPC · JPL
391436	2007 EL_{102}	—	March 11, 2007	Kitt Peak	Spacewatch	·	1.7 km	MPC · JPL
391437	2007 EE_{118}	—	March 13, 2007	Mount Lemmon	Mount Lemmon Survey	·	750 m	MPC · JPL
391438	2007 ES_{129}	—	February 23, 2007	Mount Lemmon	Mount Lemmon Survey	·	730 m	MPC · JPL
391439	2007 EP_{148}	—	March 12, 2007	Mount Lemmon	Mount Lemmon Survey	·	680 m	MPC · JPL
391440	2007 EZ_{149}	—	February 26, 2007	Mount Lemmon	Mount Lemmon Survey	·	750 m	MPC · JPL
391441	2007 ES_{168}	—	March 13, 2007	Kitt Peak	Spacewatch	·	940 m	MPC · JPL
391442	2007 EW_{173}	—	March 14, 2007	Kitt Peak	Spacewatch	·	1.1 km	MPC · JPL
391443	2007 EW_{178}	—	March 14, 2007	Kitt Peak	Spacewatch	·	930 m	MPC · JPL
391444	2007 EF_{190}	—	March 13, 2007	Mount Lemmon	Mount Lemmon Survey	·	670 m	MPC · JPL
391445	2007 EU_{195}	—	March 15, 2007	Mount Lemmon	Mount Lemmon Survey	3:2	6.3 km	MPC · JPL
391446	2007 EV_{199}	—	March 9, 2007	Catalina	CSS	·	1.0 km	MPC · JPL
391447	2007 EZ_{206}	—	March 14, 2007	Anderson Mesa	LONEOS	·	1.1 km	MPC · JPL
391448	2007 ET_{215}	—	March 12, 2007	Catalina	CSS	(2076)	970 m	MPC · JPL
391449	2007 FL_{1}	—	March 17, 2007	Catalina	CSS	AMO	730 m	MPC · JPL
391450	2007 FC_{4}	—	March 18, 2007	Mount Nyukasa	Japan Aerospace Exploration Agency	·	1.2 km	MPC · JPL
391451	2007 FE_{20}	—	March 23, 2007	Siding Spring	SSS	AMO	490 m	MPC · JPL
391452	2007 FA_{32}	—	March 20, 2007	Kitt Peak	Spacewatch	V	690 m	MPC · JPL
391453	2007 FB_{33}	—	March 20, 2007	Kitt Peak	Spacewatch	·	930 m	MPC · JPL
391454	2007 GS_{13}	—	April 11, 2007	Kitt Peak	Spacewatch	·	770 m	MPC · JPL
391455	2007 GA_{15}	—	April 11, 2007	Mount Lemmon	Mount Lemmon Survey	·	700 m	MPC · JPL
391456	2007 GQ_{20}	—	April 11, 2007	Mount Lemmon	Mount Lemmon Survey	(2076)	890 m	MPC · JPL
391457	2007 GS_{39}	—	April 14, 2007	Kitt Peak	Spacewatch	·	1.2 km	MPC · JPL
391458	2007 GG_{48}	—	April 14, 2007	Kitt Peak	Spacewatch	·	1.2 km	MPC · JPL
391459	2007 GY_{48}	—	April 14, 2007	Kitt Peak	Spacewatch	NYS	1.5 km	MPC · JPL
391460	2007 GH_{52}	—	April 14, 2007	Kitt Peak	Spacewatch	·	1.3 km	MPC · JPL
391461	2007 GY_{53}	—	April 14, 2007	Kitt Peak	Spacewatch	PHO	840 m	MPC · JPL
391462	2007 GB_{57}	—	April 15, 2007	Kitt Peak	Spacewatch	V	600 m	MPC · JPL
391463	2007 GM_{60}	—	April 15, 2007	Kitt Peak	Spacewatch	·	830 m	MPC · JPL
391464	2007 GN_{70}	—	April 15, 2007	Mount Lemmon	Mount Lemmon Survey	·	650 m	MPC · JPL
391465	2007 GF_{71}	—	March 26, 2007	Kitt Peak	Spacewatch	V	650 m	MPC · JPL
391466	2007 GW_{73}	—	April 15, 2007	Kitt Peak	Spacewatch	·	1.4 km	MPC · JPL
391467	2007 GJ_{76}	—	October 1, 2005	Mount Lemmon	Mount Lemmon Survey	·	830 m	MPC · JPL
391468	2007 HP_{23}	—	April 18, 2007	Kitt Peak	Spacewatch	·	1.0 km	MPC · JPL
391469	2007 HA_{25}	—	April 18, 2007	Kitt Peak	Spacewatch	·	870 m	MPC · JPL
391470	2007 HK_{27}	—	March 13, 2007	Mount Lemmon	Mount Lemmon Survey	·	1.5 km	MPC · JPL
391471	2007 HA_{28}	—	April 18, 2007	Kitt Peak	Spacewatch	MAS	640 m	MPC · JPL
391472	2007 HB_{29}	—	April 19, 2007	Mount Lemmon	Mount Lemmon Survey	·	790 m	MPC · JPL
391473	2007 HE_{29}	—	April 19, 2007	Mount Lemmon	Mount Lemmon Survey	·	1.3 km	MPC · JPL
391474	2007 HN_{29}	—	April 19, 2007	Mount Lemmon	Mount Lemmon Survey	·	3.4 km	MPC · JPL
391475	2007 HH_{30}	—	March 9, 2007	Kitt Peak	Spacewatch	·	1.3 km	MPC · JPL
391476	2007 HU_{38}	—	April 20, 2007	Mount Lemmon	Mount Lemmon Survey	·	820 m	MPC · JPL
391477	2007 HF_{61}	—	October 17, 2001	Kitt Peak	Spacewatch	·	760 m	MPC · JPL
391478	2007 HH_{66}	—	April 22, 2007	Mount Lemmon	Mount Lemmon Survey	·	1.3 km	MPC · JPL
391479	2007 HK_{69}	—	March 24, 2003	Kitt Peak	Spacewatch	·	1.2 km	MPC · JPL
391480	2007 HK_{78}	—	January 21, 1993	Kitt Peak	Spacewatch	·	840 m	MPC · JPL
391481	2007 HK_{85}	—	December 4, 2005	Kitt Peak	Spacewatch	·	1.0 km	MPC · JPL
391482	2007 HG_{96}	—	April 19, 2007	Kitt Peak	Spacewatch	·	1.2 km	MPC · JPL
391483	2007 JY	—	May 6, 2007	Kitt Peak	Spacewatch	·	930 m	MPC · JPL
391484	2007 JQ_{11}	—	May 7, 2007	Kitt Peak	Spacewatch	PHO	1.2 km	MPC · JPL
391485	2007 JV_{13}	—	May 9, 2007	Mount Lemmon	Mount Lemmon Survey	NYS	1.0 km	MPC · JPL
391486	2007 JB_{17}	—	May 7, 2007	Kitt Peak	Spacewatch	NYS	980 m	MPC · JPL
391487	2007 JK_{25}	—	December 4, 2005	Kitt Peak	Spacewatch	V	720 m	MPC · JPL
391488	2007 JE_{35}	—	May 11, 2007	Siding Spring	SSS	·	1.1 km	MPC · JPL
391489	2007 LG_{3}	—	June 8, 2007	Catalina	CSS	·	1.2 km	MPC · JPL
391490	2007 LZ_{3}	—	June 8, 2007	Kitt Peak	Spacewatch	·	1.4 km	MPC · JPL
391491	2007 LR_{26}	—	June 14, 2007	Kitt Peak	Spacewatch	·	2.1 km	MPC · JPL
391492	2007 MS_{20}	—	June 24, 2007	Tiki	S. F. Hönig, Teamo, N.	·	1.4 km	MPC · JPL
391493	2007 OJ_{7}	—	July 21, 2007	Siding Spring	SSS	·	1.9 km	MPC · JPL
391494	2007 OF_{10}	—	July 18, 2007	Mount Lemmon	Mount Lemmon Survey	·	1.5 km	MPC · JPL
391495	2007 OV_{10}	—	July 18, 2007	Mount Lemmon	Mount Lemmon Survey	ERI	2.0 km	MPC · JPL
391496 Colineldridge	2007 PG_{9}	Colineldridge	August 11, 2007	Shenton Park	Luckas, P.	·	3.0 km	MPC · JPL
391497	2007 PP_{13}	—	August 8, 2007	Socorro	LINEAR	MAR	1.5 km	MPC · JPL
391498	2007 PO_{14}	—	August 8, 2007	Socorro	LINEAR	·	1.8 km	MPC · JPL
391499	2007 PG_{21}	—	August 9, 2007	Socorro	LINEAR	·	3.0 km	MPC · JPL
391500	2007 PF_{32}	—	August 8, 2007	Socorro	LINEAR	·	2.3 km	MPC · JPL

== 391501–391600 ==
back to top

Designation			Discovery			Properties		Ref
Permanent	Provisional	Named after	Date	Site	Discoverer(s)	Category	Diam.	Ref
391501	2007 PV_{34}	—	August 9, 2007	Kitt Peak	Spacewatch	·	2.1 km	MPC · JPL
391502	2007 PL_{43}	—	August 10, 2007	Kitt Peak	Spacewatch	EUN	1.3 km	MPC · JPL
391503	2007 PU_{45}	—	August 9, 2007	Kitt Peak	Spacewatch	RAF	1.0 km	MPC · JPL
391504	2007 RP_{2}	—	September 2, 2007	Mount Lemmon	Mount Lemmon Survey	·	1.9 km	MPC · JPL
391505	2007 RC_{8}	—	January 22, 2006	Catalina	CSS	H	650 m	MPC · JPL
391506	2007 RW_{9}	—	September 5, 2007	Siding Spring	K. Sárneczky, L. Kiss	H	530 m	MPC · JPL
391507	2007 RP_{13}	—	September 11, 2007	Goodricke-Pigott	R. A. Tucker	·	1.9 km	MPC · JPL
391508	2007 RV_{17}	—	September 13, 2007	Mount Lemmon	Mount Lemmon Survey	APO	540 m	MPC · JPL
391509	2007 RS_{56}	—	September 9, 2007	Kitt Peak	Spacewatch	GEF	1.1 km	MPC · JPL
391510	2007 RV_{61}	—	August 10, 2007	Kitt Peak	Spacewatch	·	1.1 km	MPC · JPL
391511	2007 RK_{69}	—	September 10, 2007	Kitt Peak	Spacewatch	·	1.0 km	MPC · JPL
391512	2007 RJ_{96}	—	September 10, 2007	Kitt Peak	Spacewatch	·	2.0 km	MPC · JPL
391513	2007 RG_{97}	—	September 10, 2007	Mount Lemmon	Mount Lemmon Survey	·	1.5 km	MPC · JPL
391514	2007 RR_{116}	—	September 11, 2007	Kitt Peak	Spacewatch	·	1.5 km	MPC · JPL
391515	2007 RY_{123}	—	September 12, 2007	Catalina	CSS	·	1.4 km	MPC · JPL
391516	2007 RG_{137}	—	September 14, 2007	Mount Lemmon	Mount Lemmon Survey	·	2.0 km	MPC · JPL
391517	2007 RP_{163}	—	September 10, 2007	Kitt Peak	Spacewatch	·	2.1 km	MPC · JPL
391518	2007 RG_{164}	—	September 10, 2007	Kitt Peak	Spacewatch	·	1.2 km	MPC · JPL
391519	2007 RX_{171}	—	September 10, 2007	Kitt Peak	Spacewatch	·	1.7 km	MPC · JPL
391520	2007 RZ_{177}	—	September 10, 2007	Kitt Peak	Spacewatch	·	1.4 km	MPC · JPL
391521	2007 RD_{178}	—	September 10, 2007	Kitt Peak	Spacewatch	NEM	2.8 km	MPC · JPL
391522	2007 RX_{179}	—	September 10, 2007	Mount Lemmon	Mount Lemmon Survey	·	2.5 km	MPC · JPL
391523	2007 RH_{192}	—	September 12, 2007	Catalina	CSS	·	1.5 km	MPC · JPL
391524	2007 RM_{199}	—	September 13, 2007	Kitt Peak	Spacewatch	·	1.4 km	MPC · JPL
391525	2007 RM_{208}	—	September 10, 2007	Kitt Peak	Spacewatch	·	1.4 km	MPC · JPL
391526	2007 RV_{215}	—	September 12, 2007	Kitt Peak	Spacewatch	·	1.8 km	MPC · JPL
391527	2007 RA_{222}	—	September 14, 2007	Mount Lemmon	Mount Lemmon Survey	H	650 m	MPC · JPL
391528	2007 RF_{233}	—	September 12, 2007	Catalina	CSS	ADE	2.2 km	MPC · JPL
391529	2007 RK_{269}	—	February 16, 2001	Socorro	LINEAR	·	2.0 km	MPC · JPL
391530	2007 RO_{279}	—	August 14, 2007	Siding Spring	SSS	·	2.8 km	MPC · JPL
391531	2007 RV_{281}	—	September 1, 2007	Siding Spring	SSS	H	580 m	MPC · JPL
391532 Markdowning	2007 RK_{282}	Markdowning	September 8, 2007	Cerro Tololo	Wasserman, L. H.	·	4.1 km	MPC · JPL
391533	2007 RJ_{297}	—	September 10, 2007	Kitt Peak	Spacewatch	·	1.5 km	MPC · JPL
391534	2007 RJ_{299}	—	September 9, 2007	Mount Lemmon	Mount Lemmon Survey	·	1.5 km	MPC · JPL
391535	2007 RY_{300}	—	September 12, 2007	Mount Lemmon	Mount Lemmon Survey	·	1.8 km	MPC · JPL
391536	2007 RC_{309}	—	September 10, 2007	Mount Lemmon	Mount Lemmon Survey	L4	8.1 km	MPC · JPL
391537	2007 RP_{309}	—	September 12, 2007	Catalina	CSS	H	640 m	MPC · JPL
391538	2007 RN_{321}	—	September 14, 2007	Socorro	LINEAR	·	2.2 km	MPC · JPL
391539	2007 RT_{323}	—	September 11, 2007	Mount Lemmon	Mount Lemmon Survey	·	1.7 km	MPC · JPL
391540	2007 RT_{324}	—	September 11, 2007	Mount Lemmon	Mount Lemmon Survey	·	2.1 km	MPC · JPL
391541	2007 SB_{14}	—	September 20, 2007	Catalina	CSS	·	2.0 km	MPC · JPL
391542	2007 SA_{19}	—	September 25, 2007	Mount Lemmon	Mount Lemmon Survey	H	570 m	MPC · JPL
391543	2007 SQ_{19}	—	September 25, 2007	Mount Lemmon	Mount Lemmon Survey	·	2.4 km	MPC · JPL
391544	2007 SU_{19}	—	September 25, 2007	Mount Lemmon	Mount Lemmon Survey	·	2.0 km	MPC · JPL
391545	2007 TB_{1}	—	October 4, 2007	Siding Spring	SSS	H	720 m	MPC · JPL
391546	2007 TL_{7}	—	October 7, 2007	Altschwendt	W. Ries	·	2.1 km	MPC · JPL
391547	2007 TR_{13}	—	October 6, 2007	Socorro	LINEAR	EUN	1.5 km	MPC · JPL
391548	2007 TD_{27}	—	September 14, 2007	Mount Lemmon	Mount Lemmon Survey	·	1.8 km	MPC · JPL
391549	2007 TR_{33}	—	March 25, 2006	Kitt Peak	Spacewatch	·	1.2 km	MPC · JPL
391550	2007 TT_{48}	—	October 4, 2007	Kitt Peak	Spacewatch	·	1.9 km	MPC · JPL
391551	2007 TR_{49}	—	October 4, 2007	Kitt Peak	Spacewatch	·	1.6 km	MPC · JPL
391552	2007 TA_{56}	—	October 4, 2007	Kitt Peak	Spacewatch	·	1.4 km	MPC · JPL
391553	2007 TT_{59}	—	September 14, 2007	Kitt Peak	Spacewatch	·	2.2 km	MPC · JPL
391554	2007 TW_{60}	—	October 6, 2007	Kitt Peak	Spacewatch	·	1.8 km	MPC · JPL
391555	2007 TZ_{61}	—	October 7, 2007	Mount Lemmon	Mount Lemmon Survey	(7744)	1.4 km	MPC · JPL
391556	2007 TU_{65}	—	October 9, 2007	Socorro	LINEAR	H	570 m	MPC · JPL
391557	2007 TQ_{71}	—	October 13, 2007	Bergisch Gladbach	W. Bickel	(5)	1.3 km	MPC · JPL
391558	2007 TF_{81}	—	October 7, 2007	Mount Lemmon	Mount Lemmon Survey	·	1.7 km	MPC · JPL
391559	2007 TX_{98}	—	October 8, 2007	Mount Lemmon	Mount Lemmon Survey	·	1.9 km	MPC · JPL
391560	2007 TM_{112}	—	October 17, 1996	Kitt Peak	Spacewatch	PHO	1.0 km	MPC · JPL
391561	2007 TH_{129}	—	October 6, 2007	Kitt Peak	Spacewatch	·	1.3 km	MPC · JPL
391562	2007 TB_{134}	—	October 7, 2007	Mount Lemmon	Mount Lemmon Survey	KOR	1.2 km	MPC · JPL
391563	2007 TN_{134}	—	May 11, 2005	Mount Lemmon	Mount Lemmon Survey	·	2.2 km	MPC · JPL
391564	2007 TT_{154}	—	October 9, 2007	Socorro	LINEAR	·	2.3 km	MPC · JPL
391565	2007 TM_{162}	—	October 11, 2007	Socorro	LINEAR	·	1.5 km	MPC · JPL
391566	2007 TH_{191}	—	August 24, 2007	Kitt Peak	Spacewatch	·	1.4 km	MPC · JPL
391567	2007 TZ_{200}	—	October 8, 2007	Kitt Peak	Spacewatch	·	1.4 km	MPC · JPL
391568	2007 TY_{203}	—	October 8, 2007	Mount Lemmon	Mount Lemmon Survey	·	2.0 km	MPC · JPL
391569	2007 TJ_{218}	—	October 7, 2007	Kitt Peak	Spacewatch	·	2.1 km	MPC · JPL
391570	2007 TS_{220}	—	October 8, 2007	Kitt Peak	Spacewatch	AGN	1.4 km	MPC · JPL
391571	2007 TW_{228}	—	October 8, 2007	Kitt Peak	Spacewatch	·	2.8 km	MPC · JPL
391572	2007 TO_{233}	—	September 14, 2007	Mount Lemmon	Mount Lemmon Survey	KOR	1.3 km	MPC · JPL
391573	2007 TA_{236}	—	October 9, 2007	Mount Lemmon	Mount Lemmon Survey	·	2.5 km	MPC · JPL
391574	2007 TZ_{240}	—	October 7, 2007	Mount Lemmon	Mount Lemmon Survey	·	1.4 km	MPC · JPL
391575	2007 TL_{254}	—	October 8, 2007	Mount Lemmon	Mount Lemmon Survey	·	2.3 km	MPC · JPL
391576	2007 TW_{259}	—	October 10, 2007	Mount Lemmon	Mount Lemmon Survey	·	990 m	MPC · JPL
391577	2007 TW_{268}	—	October 9, 2007	Kitt Peak	Spacewatch	·	1.2 km	MPC · JPL
391578	2007 TF_{322}	—	October 11, 2007	Catalina	CSS	fast	1.8 km	MPC · JPL
391579	2007 TG_{322}	—	October 11, 2007	Kitt Peak	Spacewatch	EUN	1.3 km	MPC · JPL
391580	2007 TF_{329}	—	October 11, 2007	Kitt Peak	Spacewatch	·	2.0 km	MPC · JPL
391581	2007 TB_{342}	—	April 4, 2005	Kitt Peak	Spacewatch	HNS	1.1 km	MPC · JPL
391582	2007 TU_{362}	—	October 14, 2007	Mount Lemmon	Mount Lemmon Survey	HOF	3.0 km	MPC · JPL
391583	2007 TY_{362}	—	September 14, 2007	Mount Lemmon	Mount Lemmon Survey	·	2.6 km	MPC · JPL
391584	2007 TB_{366}	—	September 13, 2007	Mount Lemmon	Mount Lemmon Survey	(29841)	1.4 km	MPC · JPL
391585	2007 TS_{374}	—	September 19, 2007	Kitt Peak	Spacewatch	·	1.7 km	MPC · JPL
391586	2007 TA_{381}	—	October 14, 2007	Kitt Peak	Spacewatch	·	2.2 km	MPC · JPL
391587	2007 TL_{387}	—	October 13, 2007	Kitt Peak	Spacewatch	·	1.8 km	MPC · JPL
391588	2007 TC_{405}	—	October 15, 2007	Kitt Peak	Spacewatch	AGN	1.1 km	MPC · JPL
391589	2007 TP_{425}	—	October 8, 2007	Mount Lemmon	Mount Lemmon Survey	·	1.7 km	MPC · JPL
391590	2007 TR_{428}	—	October 11, 2007	Kitt Peak	Spacewatch	·	2.0 km	MPC · JPL
391591	2007 TK_{434}	—	October 9, 2007	Kitt Peak	Spacewatch	WIT	1.2 km	MPC · JPL
391592	2007 TT_{435}	—	October 14, 2007	Mount Lemmon	Mount Lemmon Survey	·	2.4 km	MPC · JPL
391593	2007 TW_{444}	—	October 11, 2007	Catalina	CSS	WIT	1.3 km	MPC · JPL
391594	2007 UK_{1}	—	October 16, 2007	Bisei SG Center	BATTeRS	·	1.9 km	MPC · JPL
391595	2007 UR_{2}	—	October 18, 2007	Socorro	LINEAR	·	350 m	MPC · JPL
391596	2007 UQ_{7}	—	October 16, 2007	Mount Lemmon	Mount Lemmon Survey	H	770 m	MPC · JPL
391597	2007 UJ_{13}	—	October 16, 2007	Mount Lemmon	Mount Lemmon Survey	·	2.2 km	MPC · JPL
391598	2007 UX_{26}	—	September 11, 2007	XuYi	PMO NEO Survey Program	·	2.1 km	MPC · JPL
391599	2007 UD_{29}	—	September 5, 2007	Catalina	CSS	·	2.0 km	MPC · JPL
391600	2007 UY_{30}	—	October 19, 2007	Catalina	CSS	·	1.3 km	MPC · JPL

== 391601–391700 ==
back to top

Designation			Discovery			Properties		Ref
Permanent	Provisional	Named after	Date	Site	Discoverer(s)	Category	Diam.	Ref
391601	2007 UJ_{39}	—	October 20, 2007	Catalina	CSS	·	1.5 km	MPC · JPL
391602	2007 UC_{56}	—	October 30, 2007	Kitt Peak	Spacewatch	AGN	1.2 km	MPC · JPL
391603	2007 UR_{77}	—	October 30, 2007	Kitt Peak	Spacewatch	·	1.8 km	MPC · JPL
391604	2007 UA_{78}	—	October 30, 2007	Kitt Peak	Spacewatch	·	1.6 km	MPC · JPL
391605	2007 UN_{92}	—	October 12, 2007	Kitt Peak	Spacewatch	·	1.5 km	MPC · JPL
391606	2007 UF_{113}	—	October 30, 2007	Kitt Peak	Spacewatch	·	2.0 km	MPC · JPL
391607	2007 UP_{126}	—	October 16, 2007	Mount Lemmon	Mount Lemmon Survey	·	2.8 km	MPC · JPL
391608	2007 UE_{129}	—	October 16, 2007	Mount Lemmon	Mount Lemmon Survey	·	2.3 km	MPC · JPL
391609	2007 UT_{130}	—	October 20, 2007	Mount Lemmon	Mount Lemmon Survey	WIT	1.0 km	MPC · JPL
391610	2007 UU_{134}	—	October 20, 2007	Mount Lemmon	Mount Lemmon Survey	·	2.0 km	MPC · JPL
391611	2007 UL_{140}	—	October 16, 2007	Catalina	CSS	·	2.8 km	MPC · JPL
391612	2007 UQ_{141}	—	October 18, 2007	Kitt Peak	Spacewatch	EUN	1.5 km	MPC · JPL
391613	2007 VU_{3}	—	November 2, 2007	Dauban	Chante-Perdrix	·	2.0 km	MPC · JPL
391614	2007 VO_{21}	—	November 2, 2007	Mount Lemmon	Mount Lemmon Survey	·	950 m	MPC · JPL
391615	2007 VS_{22}	—	November 2, 2007	Mount Lemmon	Mount Lemmon Survey	·	1.4 km	MPC · JPL
391616	2007 VK_{23}	—	October 11, 2007	Catalina	CSS	·	2.5 km	MPC · JPL
391617	2007 VP_{48}	—	November 1, 2007	Kitt Peak	Spacewatch	·	2.4 km	MPC · JPL
391618	2007 VD_{51}	—	November 1, 2007	Kitt Peak	Spacewatch	·	1.6 km	MPC · JPL
391619	2007 VT_{52}	—	October 20, 2007	Mount Lemmon	Mount Lemmon Survey	·	2.1 km	MPC · JPL
391620	2007 VJ_{53}	—	November 1, 2007	Kitt Peak	Spacewatch	HOF	2.6 km	MPC · JPL
391621	2007 VE_{54}	—	November 1, 2007	Kitt Peak	Spacewatch	EUN	1.5 km	MPC · JPL
391622	2007 VU_{65}	—	November 2, 2007	Mount Lemmon	Mount Lemmon Survey	RAF	870 m	MPC · JPL
391623	2007 VV_{66}	—	November 2, 2007	Kitt Peak	Spacewatch	·	2.2 km	MPC · JPL
391624	2007 VZ_{101}	—	November 2, 2007	Mount Lemmon	Mount Lemmon Survey	H	800 m	MPC · JPL
391625	2007 VY_{108}	—	October 10, 2007	Mount Lemmon	Mount Lemmon Survey	·	1.5 km	MPC · JPL
391626	2007 VJ_{109}	—	November 3, 2007	Kitt Peak	Spacewatch	·	1.5 km	MPC · JPL
391627	2007 VK_{114}	—	November 3, 2007	Kitt Peak	Spacewatch	·	1.9 km	MPC · JPL
391628	2007 VU_{118}	—	November 4, 2007	Kitt Peak	Spacewatch	WIT	1.1 km	MPC · JPL
391629	2007 VX_{133}	—	October 18, 2007	Kitt Peak	Spacewatch	EOS	1.7 km	MPC · JPL
391630	2007 VO_{141}	—	November 4, 2007	Kitt Peak	Spacewatch	·	1.9 km	MPC · JPL
391631	2007 VT_{141}	—	October 20, 2007	Mount Lemmon	Mount Lemmon Survey	BRA	1.9 km	MPC · JPL
391632	2007 VR_{152}	—	November 2, 2007	Mount Lemmon	Mount Lemmon Survey	·	2.0 km	MPC · JPL
391633	2007 VG_{160}	—	November 5, 2007	Kitt Peak	Spacewatch	·	2.4 km	MPC · JPL
391634	2007 VS_{178}	—	November 7, 2007	Mount Lemmon	Mount Lemmon Survey	·	1.9 km	MPC · JPL
391635	2007 VV_{208}	—	October 20, 2007	Catalina	CSS	H	620 m	MPC · JPL
391636	2007 VJ_{220}	—	November 9, 2007	Kitt Peak	Spacewatch	KOR	1.4 km	MPC · JPL
391637	2007 VT_{232}	—	November 7, 2007	Kitt Peak	Spacewatch	AST	1.5 km	MPC · JPL
391638	2007 VC_{247}	—	October 9, 2007	Kitt Peak	Spacewatch	(194)	1.7 km	MPC · JPL
391639	2007 VZ_{254}	—	November 11, 2007	Mount Lemmon	Mount Lemmon Survey	·	2.1 km	MPC · JPL
391640	2007 VG_{257}	—	November 7, 2007	Kitt Peak	Spacewatch	·	2.1 km	MPC · JPL
391641	2007 VX_{266}	—	November 13, 2007	Catalina	CSS	H	670 m	MPC · JPL
391642	2007 VF_{267}	—	November 15, 2007	Catalina	CSS	H	680 m	MPC · JPL
391643	2007 VO_{270}	—	November 7, 2007	Kitt Peak	Spacewatch	ADE	1.9 km	MPC · JPL
391644	2007 VF_{282}	—	October 16, 2007	Mount Lemmon	Mount Lemmon Survey	·	2.5 km	MPC · JPL
391645	2007 VR_{282}	—	November 3, 2007	Kitt Peak	Spacewatch	·	1.6 km	MPC · JPL
391646	2007 VY_{289}	—	November 14, 2007	Catalina	CSS	T_{j} (2.94)	3.8 km	MPC · JPL
391647	2007 VU_{290}	—	November 14, 2007	Kitt Peak	Spacewatch	·	1.9 km	MPC · JPL
391648	2007 VA_{293}	—	November 15, 2007	Mount Lemmon	Mount Lemmon Survey	·	1.8 km	MPC · JPL
391649	2007 VB_{306}	—	November 14, 2007	Kitt Peak	Spacewatch	EOS	2.3 km	MPC · JPL
391650	2007 VQ_{310}	—	November 9, 2007	Mount Lemmon	Mount Lemmon Survey	THM	2.4 km	MPC · JPL
391651	2007 VQ_{314}	—	November 2, 2007	Mount Lemmon	Mount Lemmon Survey	·	2.3 km	MPC · JPL
391652	2007 VY_{319}	—	November 2, 2007	Socorro	LINEAR	·	3.2 km	MPC · JPL
391653	2007 VZ_{329}	—	November 2, 2007	Mount Lemmon	Mount Lemmon Survey	·	4.0 km	MPC · JPL
391654	2007 WA_{21}	—	November 9, 2007	Mount Lemmon	Mount Lemmon Survey	·	3.2 km	MPC · JPL
391655	2007 WO_{21}	—	October 18, 2007	Kitt Peak	Spacewatch	·	2.6 km	MPC · JPL
391656	2007 WE_{35}	—	November 19, 2007	Mount Lemmon	Mount Lemmon Survey	HOF	2.0 km	MPC · JPL
391657	2007 WX_{57}	—	November 18, 2007	Kitt Peak	Spacewatch	KOR	1.5 km	MPC · JPL
391658	2007 WB_{59}	—	November 19, 2007	Mount Lemmon	Mount Lemmon Survey	LIX	3.7 km	MPC · JPL
391659	2007 WC_{61}	—	November 18, 2007	Mount Lemmon	Mount Lemmon Survey	·	6.7 km	MPC · JPL
391660	2007 XG_{20}	—	December 13, 2007	Dauban	Chante-Perdrix	·	2.5 km	MPC · JPL
391661	2007 XM_{27}	—	December 3, 2007	Kitt Peak	Spacewatch	·	2.9 km	MPC · JPL
391662	2007 XP_{45}	—	December 15, 2007	Kitt Peak	Spacewatch	KOR	1.5 km	MPC · JPL
391663	2007 XB_{57}	—	December 4, 2007	Socorro	LINEAR	·	1.7 km	MPC · JPL
391664	2007 YG_{22}	—	December 16, 2007	Kitt Peak	Spacewatch	·	4.1 km	MPC · JPL
391665	2007 YA_{26}	—	December 18, 2007	Mount Lemmon	Mount Lemmon Survey	·	2.4 km	MPC · JPL
391666	2007 YD_{26}	—	December 18, 2007	Mount Lemmon	Mount Lemmon Survey	EOS	1.4 km	MPC · JPL
391667	2007 YD_{28}	—	December 18, 2007	Kitt Peak	Spacewatch	·	2.5 km	MPC · JPL
391668	2007 YD_{33}	—	November 18, 2007	Kitt Peak	Spacewatch	KOR	1.4 km	MPC · JPL
391669	2007 YO_{50}	—	November 7, 2007	Mount Lemmon	Mount Lemmon Survey	·	3.4 km	MPC · JPL
391670	2007 YH_{53}	—	December 30, 2007	Kitt Peak	Spacewatch	·	2.7 km	MPC · JPL
391671	2007 YJ_{61}	—	December 31, 2007	Catalina	CSS	H	620 m	MPC · JPL
391672	2008 AF_{5}	—	December 14, 2007	Mount Lemmon	Mount Lemmon Survey	·	2.9 km	MPC · JPL
391673	2008 AC_{11}	—	January 10, 2008	Mount Lemmon	Mount Lemmon Survey	·	2.3 km	MPC · JPL
391674	2008 AP_{11}	—	November 8, 2007	Mount Lemmon	Mount Lemmon Survey	EOS	2.3 km	MPC · JPL
391675	2008 AZ_{14}	—	January 10, 2008	Kitt Peak	Spacewatch	HYG	2.6 km	MPC · JPL
391676	2008 AV_{17}	—	January 10, 2008	Kitt Peak	Spacewatch	·	2.6 km	MPC · JPL
391677	2008 AT_{21}	—	January 14, 2002	Socorro	LINEAR	EOS	2.4 km	MPC · JPL
391678	2008 AF_{26}	—	January 10, 2008	Mount Lemmon	Mount Lemmon Survey	·	3.3 km	MPC · JPL
391679	2008 AF_{28}	—	January 10, 2008	Mount Lemmon	Mount Lemmon Survey	THB	3.2 km	MPC · JPL
391680	2008 AK_{32}	—	November 4, 2007	Mount Lemmon	Mount Lemmon Survey	·	3.1 km	MPC · JPL
391681	2008 AK_{41}	—	January 10, 2008	Mount Lemmon	Mount Lemmon Survey	·	3.0 km	MPC · JPL
391682	2008 AC_{43}	—	November 11, 2007	Mount Lemmon	Mount Lemmon Survey	·	2.7 km	MPC · JPL
391683	2008 AC_{60}	—	January 11, 2008	Kitt Peak	Spacewatch	·	2.1 km	MPC · JPL
391684	2008 AF_{62}	—	January 11, 2008	Kitt Peak	Spacewatch	·	2.6 km	MPC · JPL
391685	2008 AG_{64}	—	January 11, 2008	Mount Lemmon	Mount Lemmon Survey	·	2.2 km	MPC · JPL
391686	2008 AX_{67}	—	January 11, 2008	Kitt Peak	Spacewatch	·	2.3 km	MPC · JPL
391687	2008 AH_{89}	—	January 13, 2008	Kitt Peak	Spacewatch	·	2.4 km	MPC · JPL
391688	2008 AJ_{90}	—	January 13, 2008	Kitt Peak	Spacewatch	·	1.6 km	MPC · JPL
391689	2008 AF_{94}	—	December 30, 2007	Kitt Peak	Spacewatch	·	2.4 km	MPC · JPL
391690	2008 AJ_{94}	—	January 14, 2008	Kitt Peak	Spacewatch	THM	2.2 km	MPC · JPL
391691	2008 AJ_{103}	—	November 11, 2007	Mount Lemmon	Mount Lemmon Survey	·	2.5 km	MPC · JPL
391692	2008 AQ_{104}	—	December 20, 2007	Kitt Peak	Spacewatch	·	2.4 km	MPC · JPL
391693	2008 AA_{123}	—	December 14, 2007	Mount Lemmon	Mount Lemmon Survey	·	2.3 km	MPC · JPL
391694	2008 AD_{127}	—	January 1, 2008	Kitt Peak	Spacewatch	HYG	2.5 km	MPC · JPL
391695	2008 AG_{127}	—	January 1, 2008	Kitt Peak	Spacewatch	·	2.2 km	MPC · JPL
391696	2008 AF_{129}	—	January 14, 2008	Kitt Peak	Spacewatch	EOS	2.0 km	MPC · JPL
391697	2008 AD_{135}	—	January 11, 2008	Catalina	CSS	·	2.5 km	MPC · JPL
391698	2008 AA_{136}	—	January 11, 2008	Kitt Peak	Spacewatch	·	2.9 km	MPC · JPL
391699	2008 AG_{137}	—	January 16, 2008	Mount Lemmon	Mount Lemmon Survey	·	2.9 km	MPC · JPL
391700	2008 BU_{11}	—	January 18, 2008	Mount Lemmon	Mount Lemmon Survey	·	1.9 km	MPC · JPL

== 391701–391800 ==
back to top

Designation			Discovery			Properties		Ref
Permanent	Provisional	Named after	Date	Site	Discoverer(s)	Category	Diam.	Ref
391701	2008 BR_{15}	—	January 28, 2008	Lulin	LUSS	·	3.0 km	MPC · JPL
391702	2008 BW_{16}	—	December 14, 2007	Mount Lemmon	Mount Lemmon Survey	EOS	2.3 km	MPC · JPL
391703	2008 BT_{40}	—	January 12, 2008	Kitt Peak	Spacewatch	·	2.8 km	MPC · JPL
391704	2008 BB_{44}	—	October 26, 2007	Mount Lemmon	Mount Lemmon Survey	·	2.5 km	MPC · JPL
391705	2008 BS_{48}	—	January 20, 2008	Kitt Peak	Spacewatch	·	3.0 km	MPC · JPL
391706	2008 CF_{2}	—	February 1, 2008	Catalina	CSS	·	3.4 km	MPC · JPL
391707	2008 CH_{7}	—	February 2, 2008	Kitt Peak	Spacewatch	·	2.6 km	MPC · JPL
391708	2008 CJ_{10}	—	February 2, 2008	Kitt Peak	Spacewatch	EUP	4.8 km	MPC · JPL
391709	2008 CK_{11}	—	February 3, 2008	Kitt Peak	Spacewatch	EOS	2.1 km	MPC · JPL
391710	2008 CM_{14}	—	February 3, 2008	Kitt Peak	Spacewatch	·	2.9 km	MPC · JPL
391711	2008 CK_{15}	—	February 3, 2008	Kitt Peak	Spacewatch	THM	2.3 km	MPC · JPL
391712	2008 CD_{19}	—	February 3, 2008	Kitt Peak	Spacewatch	·	2.9 km	MPC · JPL
391713	2008 CB_{39}	—	January 10, 2008	Mount Lemmon	Mount Lemmon Survey	·	3.0 km	MPC · JPL
391714	2008 CK_{43}	—	February 2, 2008	Kitt Peak	Spacewatch	·	2.3 km	MPC · JPL
391715	2008 CA_{50}	—	February 6, 2008	Catalina	CSS	·	3.4 km	MPC · JPL
391716	2008 CM_{50}	—	February 6, 2008	Catalina	CSS	·	2.9 km	MPC · JPL
391717	2008 CV_{50}	—	February 6, 2008	Catalina	CSS	LIX	3.8 km	MPC · JPL
391718	2008 CB_{52}	—	November 7, 2007	Mount Lemmon	Mount Lemmon Survey	·	1.9 km	MPC · JPL
391719	2008 CN_{68}	—	February 6, 2008	Socorro	LINEAR	·	3.5 km	MPC · JPL
391720	2008 CD_{73}	—	February 6, 2008	Catalina	CSS	·	3.0 km	MPC · JPL
391721	2008 CX_{74}	—	January 11, 2008	Mount Lemmon	Mount Lemmon Survey	HYG	2.7 km	MPC · JPL
391722	2008 CW_{82}	—	February 7, 2008	Kitt Peak	Spacewatch	·	3.3 km	MPC · JPL
391723	2008 CU_{85}	—	February 7, 2008	Mount Lemmon	Mount Lemmon Survey	·	3.4 km	MPC · JPL
391724	2008 CV_{107}	—	March 23, 2003	Kitt Peak	Spacewatch	EOS	2.0 km	MPC · JPL
391725	2008 CB_{114}	—	February 10, 2008	Kitt Peak	Spacewatch	TIR	3.0 km	MPC · JPL
391726	2008 CE_{130}	—	September 11, 2005	Kitt Peak	Spacewatch	·	3.0 km	MPC · JPL
391727	2008 CH_{131}	—	February 8, 2008	Kitt Peak	Spacewatch	EOS	2.1 km	MPC · JPL
391728	2008 CZ_{144}	—	February 9, 2008	Kitt Peak	Spacewatch	VER	2.9 km	MPC · JPL
391729	2008 CP_{145}	—	February 9, 2008	Kitt Peak	Spacewatch	EOS	2.0 km	MPC · JPL
391730	2008 CV_{146}	—	February 9, 2008	Kitt Peak	Spacewatch	·	2.3 km	MPC · JPL
391731	2008 CX_{146}	—	February 9, 2008	Kitt Peak	Spacewatch	(8737)	3.2 km	MPC · JPL
391732	2008 CT_{167}	—	February 11, 2008	Mount Lemmon	Mount Lemmon Survey	·	2.6 km	MPC · JPL
391733	2008 CU_{174}	—	February 13, 2008	Kitt Peak	Spacewatch	·	2.3 km	MPC · JPL
391734	2008 CT_{189}	—	February 13, 2008	Catalina	CSS	LUT	5.6 km	MPC · JPL
391735	2008 CD_{192}	—	February 2, 2008	Mount Lemmon	Mount Lemmon Survey	·	2.6 km	MPC · JPL
391736	2008 CZ_{192}	—	February 8, 2008	Kitt Peak	Spacewatch	·	2.5 km	MPC · JPL
391737	2008 CO_{196}	—	February 7, 2008	Kitt Peak	Spacewatch	·	3.2 km	MPC · JPL
391738	2008 CL_{199}	—	February 13, 2008	Mount Lemmon	Mount Lemmon Survey	THM	2.2 km	MPC · JPL
391739	2008 CD_{200}	—	February 9, 2008	Mount Lemmon	Mount Lemmon Survey	·	3.1 km	MPC · JPL
391740	2008 CP_{201}	—	February 2, 2008	Kitt Peak	Spacewatch	EOS	1.8 km	MPC · JPL
391741	2008 CS_{202}	—	February 8, 2008	Kitt Peak	Spacewatch	·	2.6 km	MPC · JPL
391742	2008 CN_{203}	—	February 11, 2008	Mount Lemmon	Mount Lemmon Survey	HYG	3.1 km	MPC · JPL
391743	2008 DX_{5}	—	December 31, 2007	Kitt Peak	Spacewatch	·	2.1 km	MPC · JPL
391744	2008 DC_{9}	—	February 25, 2008	Kitt Peak	Spacewatch	·	2.9 km	MPC · JPL
391745	2008 DK_{11}	—	February 26, 2008	Kitt Peak	Spacewatch	·	2.6 km	MPC · JPL
391746	2008 DH_{12}	—	February 26, 2008	Kitt Peak	Spacewatch	TIR	2.3 km	MPC · JPL
391747	2008 DC_{24}	—	December 31, 2007	Mount Lemmon	Mount Lemmon Survey	·	2.7 km	MPC · JPL
391748	2008 DK_{28}	—	February 25, 2008	Mount Lemmon	Mount Lemmon Survey	·	3.2 km	MPC · JPL
391749	2008 DZ_{42}	—	February 28, 2008	Kitt Peak	Spacewatch	·	3.2 km	MPC · JPL
391750	2008 DX_{54}	—	February 29, 2008	Catalina	CSS	·	3.7 km	MPC · JPL
391751	2008 DY_{62}	—	February 13, 2008	Kitt Peak	Spacewatch	·	2.9 km	MPC · JPL
391752	2008 DK_{68}	—	February 6, 2008	Catalina	CSS	·	3.3 km	MPC · JPL
391753	2008 DX_{88}	—	February 28, 2008	Mount Lemmon	Mount Lemmon Survey	·	4.1 km	MPC · JPL
391754	2008 EU_{4}	—	February 13, 2008	Mount Lemmon	Mount Lemmon Survey	·	3.6 km	MPC · JPL
391755	2008 EA_{35}	—	February 13, 2008	Mount Lemmon	Mount Lemmon Survey	·	3.0 km	MPC · JPL
391756	2008 EO_{36}	—	March 3, 2008	Kitt Peak	Spacewatch	EUP	3.8 km	MPC · JPL
391757	2008 ES_{49}	—	March 6, 2008	Kitt Peak	Spacewatch	·	4.5 km	MPC · JPL
391758	2008 EP_{55}	—	March 7, 2008	Kitt Peak	Spacewatch	VER	2.6 km	MPC · JPL
391759	2008 EB_{61}	—	March 9, 2008	Charleston	Astronomical Research Observatory	·	3.7 km	MPC · JPL
391760	2008 ED_{72}	—	March 6, 2008	Mount Lemmon	Mount Lemmon Survey	·	3.0 km	MPC · JPL
391761	2008 EK_{107}	—	March 6, 2008	Mount Lemmon	Mount Lemmon Survey	·	3.0 km	MPC · JPL
391762	2008 EJ_{128}	—	March 11, 2008	Kitt Peak	Spacewatch	·	3.0 km	MPC · JPL
391763	2008 EY_{129}	—	August 3, 2004	Siding Spring	SSS	HYG	3.2 km	MPC · JPL
391764	2008 EO_{168}	—	March 11, 2008	Kitt Peak	Spacewatch	·	3.2 km	MPC · JPL
391765	2008 EY_{169}	—	February 8, 2008	Mount Lemmon	Mount Lemmon Survey	·	2.3 km	MPC · JPL
391766	2008 FA	—	March 19, 2008	Wrightwood	J. W. Young	T_{j} (2.93)	5.8 km	MPC · JPL
391767	2008 FW_{9}	—	March 26, 2008	Kitt Peak	Spacewatch	·	3.7 km	MPC · JPL
391768	2008 FP_{39}	—	March 28, 2008	Kitt Peak	Spacewatch	·	2.9 km	MPC · JPL
391769	2008 FJ_{54}	—	October 10, 1999	Kitt Peak	Spacewatch	·	3.3 km	MPC · JPL
391770	2008 FK_{133}	—	March 26, 2008	Mount Lemmon	Mount Lemmon Survey	THM	2.2 km	MPC · JPL
391771	2008 GE_{112}	—	April 1, 2008	Catalina	CSS	T_{j} (2.86)	3.9 km	MPC · JPL
391772	2008 GH_{140}	—	April 6, 2008	Kitt Peak	Spacewatch	CYB	4.7 km	MPC · JPL
391773	2008 HW_{33}	—	April 26, 2008	Kitt Peak	Spacewatch	·	650 m	MPC · JPL
391774	2008 KQ_{35}	—	May 27, 2008	Kitt Peak	Spacewatch	·	3.3 km	MPC · JPL
391775	2008 LO_{13}	—	April 6, 2008	Mount Lemmon	Mount Lemmon Survey	·	2.0 km	MPC · JPL
391776	2008 ON_{7}	—	July 29, 2008	Mount Lemmon	Mount Lemmon Survey	·	2.3 km	MPC · JPL
391777	2008 PO	—	August 1, 2008	Dauban	Kugel, F.	·	770 m	MPC · JPL
391778	2008 PF_{7}	—	August 6, 2008	Hibiscus	S. F. Hönig, Teamo, N.	·	730 m	MPC · JPL
391779	2008 PM_{7}	—	August 5, 2008	La Sagra	OAM	·	3.0 km	MPC · JPL
391780	2008 PU_{13}	—	August 10, 2008	Dauban	Kugel, F.	·	790 m	MPC · JPL
391781	2008 PH_{16}	—	August 6, 2008	La Sagra	OAM	·	880 m	MPC · JPL
391782	2008 PJ_{22}	—	August 1, 2008	Socorro	LINEAR	·	1.1 km	MPC · JPL
391783	2008 QY_{5}	—	August 26, 2008	La Sagra	OAM	·	1.8 km	MPC · JPL
391784	2008 QZ_{17}	—	August 28, 2008	Dauban	Kugel, F.	V	620 m	MPC · JPL
391785	2008 QQ_{18}	—	July 28, 2008	Mount Lemmon	Mount Lemmon Survey	·	860 m	MPC · JPL
391786	2008 QF_{45}	—	August 26, 2008	Socorro	LINEAR	·	900 m	MPC · JPL
391787	2008 QQ_{46}	—	August 26, 2008	Socorro	LINEAR	·	930 m	MPC · JPL
391788	2008 RA_{1}	—	December 2, 2004	Kitt Peak	Spacewatch	·	1.6 km	MPC · JPL
391789	2008 RR_{26}	—	September 8, 2008	Siding Spring	SSS	PHO	1.4 km	MPC · JPL
391790	2008 RU_{43}	—	September 2, 2008	Kitt Peak	Spacewatch	L4	8.9 km	MPC · JPL
391791	2008 RC_{64}	—	September 4, 2008	Kitt Peak	Spacewatch	·	660 m	MPC · JPL
391792	2008 RE_{70}	—	September 5, 2008	Kitt Peak	Spacewatch	L4 · ERY	8.6 km	MPC · JPL
391793	2008 RR_{73}	—	September 6, 2008	Catalina	CSS	·	1.3 km	MPC · JPL
391794	2008 RV_{73}	—	September 6, 2008	Catalina	CSS	V	770 m	MPC · JPL
391795 Univofutah	2008 RV_{77}	Univofutah	September 8, 2008	Tooele	P. Wiggins	·	2.3 km	MPC · JPL
391796	2008 RH_{78}	—	September 10, 2008	Wrightwood	J. W. Young	·	1.3 km	MPC · JPL
391797	2008 RM_{88}	—	September 5, 2008	Kitt Peak	Spacewatch	·	1.0 km	MPC · JPL
391798	2008 RG_{90}	—	September 5, 2008	Kitt Peak	Spacewatch	·	770 m	MPC · JPL
391799	2008 RL_{102}	—	September 3, 2008	Kitt Peak	Spacewatch	·	970 m	MPC · JPL
391800	2008 RC_{106}	—	September 6, 2008	Mount Lemmon	Mount Lemmon Survey	V	690 m	MPC · JPL

== 391801–391900 ==
back to top

Designation			Discovery			Properties		Ref
Permanent	Provisional	Named after	Date	Site	Discoverer(s)	Category	Diam.	Ref
391801	2008 RD_{107}	—	September 7, 2008	Catalina	CSS	·	1.0 km	MPC · JPL
391802	2008 RZ_{113}	—	September 6, 2008	Kitt Peak	Spacewatch	L4	9.3 km	MPC · JPL
391803	2008 RF_{115}	—	September 6, 2008	Mount Lemmon	Mount Lemmon Survey	·	1.5 km	MPC · JPL
391804	2008 RM_{126}	—	September 3, 2008	Kitt Peak	Spacewatch	L4	7.4 km	MPC · JPL
391805	2008 RM_{128}	—	September 7, 2008	Mount Lemmon	Mount Lemmon Survey	·	1.2 km	MPC · JPL
391806	2008 RS_{128}	—	September 2, 2008	Kitt Peak	Spacewatch	L4	7.3 km	MPC · JPL
391807	2008 RP_{135}	—	September 3, 2008	Kitt Peak	Spacewatch	·	1.5 km	MPC · JPL
391808	2008 RF_{136}	—	September 4, 2008	Socorro	LINEAR	·	850 m	MPC · JPL
391809	2008 RK_{136}	—	September 4, 2008	Kitt Peak	Spacewatch	·	1.1 km	MPC · JPL
391810	2008 RX_{136}	—	September 4, 2008	Kitt Peak	Spacewatch	(2076)	810 m	MPC · JPL
391811	2008 RL_{137}	—	September 5, 2008	Kitt Peak	Spacewatch	·	1.4 km	MPC · JPL
391812	2008 RR_{138}	—	September 6, 2008	Mount Lemmon	Mount Lemmon Survey	·	770 m	MPC · JPL
391813	2008 RC_{147}	—	September 7, 2008	Catalina	CSS	V	560 m	MPC · JPL
391814	2008 SB_{4}	—	September 22, 2008	Socorro	LINEAR	·	620 m	MPC · JPL
391815	2008 SL_{7}	—	September 22, 2008	Goodricke-Pigott	R. A. Tucker	·	1.3 km	MPC · JPL
391816	2008 SZ_{16}	—	September 19, 2008	Kitt Peak	Spacewatch	·	930 m	MPC · JPL
391817	2008 SK_{28}	—	September 19, 2008	Kitt Peak	Spacewatch	·	1.2 km	MPC · JPL
391818	2008 SZ_{29}	—	September 19, 2008	Kitt Peak	Spacewatch	·	1.5 km	MPC · JPL
391819	2008 SS_{30}	—	September 20, 2008	Kitt Peak	Spacewatch	·	1.9 km	MPC · JPL
391820	2008 SY_{30}	—	September 9, 2008	Kitt Peak	Spacewatch	V	840 m	MPC · JPL
391821	2008 SV_{39}	—	September 20, 2008	Kitt Peak	Spacewatch	·	760 m	MPC · JPL
391822	2008 SD_{49}	—	September 2, 2008	Kitt Peak	Spacewatch	L4	7.4 km	MPC · JPL
391823	2008 SC_{60}	—	September 9, 2008	Kitt Peak	Spacewatch	·	960 m	MPC · JPL
391824	2008 SP_{88}	—	September 20, 2008	Kitt Peak	Spacewatch	·	1.5 km	MPC · JPL
391825	2008 SO_{91}	—	September 21, 2008	Kitt Peak	Spacewatch	·	990 m	MPC · JPL
391826	2008 SP_{94}	—	September 6, 2008	Kitt Peak	Spacewatch	·	720 m	MPC · JPL
391827	2008 SD_{114}	—	September 22, 2008	Kitt Peak	Spacewatch	·	850 m	MPC · JPL
391828	2008 SQ_{116}	—	September 22, 2008	Mount Lemmon	Mount Lemmon Survey	·	1.0 km	MPC · JPL
391829	2008 ST_{116}	—	September 22, 2008	Mount Lemmon	Mount Lemmon Survey	·	1.3 km	MPC · JPL
391830	2008 SB_{118}	—	September 22, 2008	Mount Lemmon	Mount Lemmon Survey	·	1.3 km	MPC · JPL
391831	2008 SH_{130}	—	September 22, 2008	Kitt Peak	Spacewatch	·	850 m	MPC · JPL
391832	2008 SE_{148}	—	September 27, 2008	Goodricke-Pigott	R. A. Tucker	·	1.5 km	MPC · JPL
391833	2008 SS_{148}	—	September 6, 2008	Catalina	CSS	·	1.7 km	MPC · JPL
391834	2008 SW_{148}	—	September 27, 2008	Andrushivka	Andrushivka	·	1.1 km	MPC · JPL
391835	2008 SO_{153}	—	September 3, 2008	Kitt Peak	Spacewatch	·	1.6 km	MPC · JPL
391836	2008 SH_{162}	—	September 10, 2008	Kitt Peak	Spacewatch	·	1.2 km	MPC · JPL
391837	2008 SG_{170}	—	September 21, 2008	Mount Lemmon	Mount Lemmon Survey	·	1.0 km	MPC · JPL
391838	2008 SE_{179}	—	September 24, 2008	Kitt Peak	Spacewatch	·	650 m	MPC · JPL
391839	2008 SO_{179}	—	November 14, 1995	Kitt Peak	Spacewatch	·	800 m	MPC · JPL
391840	2008 SK_{197}	—	September 25, 2008	Kitt Peak	Spacewatch	·	2.4 km	MPC · JPL
391841	2008 SS_{208}	—	September 27, 2008	Mount Lemmon	Mount Lemmon Survey	·	1.6 km	MPC · JPL
391842	2008 SK_{232}	—	March 12, 2007	Kitt Peak	Spacewatch	·	940 m	MPC · JPL
391843	2008 SN_{235}	—	September 5, 2008	Kitt Peak	Spacewatch	·	1.3 km	MPC · JPL
391844	2008 SU_{254}	—	September 23, 2008	Kitt Peak	Spacewatch	L4	9.2 km	MPC · JPL
391845	2008 SM_{257}	—	September 22, 2008	Kitt Peak	Spacewatch	L4	10 km	MPC · JPL
391846	2008 SK_{261}	—	September 23, 2008	Kitt Peak	Spacewatch	EOS	1.7 km	MPC · JPL
391847	2008 SS_{278}	—	September 24, 2008	Kitt Peak	Spacewatch	·	1.2 km	MPC · JPL
391848	2008 SD_{283}	—	September 21, 2008	Mount Lemmon	Mount Lemmon Survey	·	1.6 km	MPC · JPL
391849	2008 SH_{285}	—	September 19, 2008	Kitt Peak	Spacewatch	·	1.4 km	MPC · JPL
391850	2008 SL_{286}	—	September 22, 2008	Mount Lemmon	Mount Lemmon Survey	MAR	1.2 km	MPC · JPL
391851	2008 SQ_{290}	—	September 23, 2008	Mount Lemmon	Mount Lemmon Survey	NYS	1.1 km	MPC · JPL
391852	2008 SB_{294}	—	September 20, 2008	Catalina	CSS	·	710 m	MPC · JPL
391853	2008 SN_{298}	—	September 21, 2008	Kitt Peak	Spacewatch	·	1.1 km	MPC · JPL
391854	2008 SU_{299}	—	September 22, 2008	Kitt Peak	Spacewatch	·	1.5 km	MPC · JPL
391855	2008 SG_{300}	—	September 22, 2008	Catalina	CSS	RAF	810 m	MPC · JPL
391856	2008 SO_{305}	—	September 27, 2008	Mount Lemmon	Mount Lemmon Survey	·	1.4 km	MPC · JPL
391857	2008 TC_{14}	—	October 1, 2008	Mount Lemmon	Mount Lemmon Survey	PHO	780 m	MPC · JPL
391858	2008 TD_{20}	—	September 22, 2008	Mount Lemmon	Mount Lemmon Survey	·	1.5 km	MPC · JPL
391859	2008 TP_{24}	—	October 2, 2008	Catalina	CSS	·	910 m	MPC · JPL
391860	2008 TP_{25}	—	October 2, 2008	Mount Lemmon	Mount Lemmon Survey	·	980 m	MPC · JPL
391861	2008 TZ_{27}	—	October 6, 2004	Kitt Peak	Spacewatch	·	1.2 km	MPC · JPL
391862	2008 TE_{31}	—	October 1, 2008	Kitt Peak	Spacewatch	·	1.2 km	MPC · JPL
391863	2008 TA_{42}	—	October 1, 2008	Mount Lemmon	Mount Lemmon Survey	·	1.1 km	MPC · JPL
391864	2008 TF_{55}	—	October 2, 2008	Kitt Peak	Spacewatch	NYS	1.1 km	MPC · JPL
391865	2008 TK_{58}	—	October 2, 2008	Kitt Peak	Spacewatch	·	1.4 km	MPC · JPL
391866	2008 TV_{65}	—	October 2, 2008	Catalina	CSS	·	1.2 km	MPC · JPL
391867	2008 TE_{69}	—	October 2, 2008	Kitt Peak	Spacewatch	·	1.2 km	MPC · JPL
391868	2008 TH_{73}	—	October 2, 2008	Kitt Peak	Spacewatch	·	830 m	MPC · JPL
391869	2008 TN_{89}	—	October 3, 2008	Kitt Peak	Spacewatch	·	840 m	MPC · JPL
391870	2008 TO_{92}	—	October 4, 2008	La Sagra	OAM	L4	10 km	MPC · JPL
391871	2008 TG_{109}	—	September 22, 2008	Kitt Peak	Spacewatch	·	1.5 km	MPC · JPL
391872	2008 TN_{110}	—	October 6, 2008	Catalina	CSS	V	830 m	MPC · JPL
391873	2008 TW_{110}	—	September 23, 2008	Kitt Peak	Spacewatch	·	1.2 km	MPC · JPL
391874	2008 TT_{111}	—	October 6, 2008	Catalina	CSS	V	780 m	MPC · JPL
391875	2008 TE_{112}	—	October 6, 2008	Catalina	CSS	·	1.5 km	MPC · JPL
391876	2008 TE_{118}	—	October 6, 2008	Kitt Peak	Spacewatch	V	790 m	MPC · JPL
391877	2008 TV_{125}	—	October 8, 2008	Mount Lemmon	Mount Lemmon Survey	L4	8.8 km	MPC · JPL
391878	2008 TS_{130}	—	September 23, 2008	Kitt Peak	Spacewatch	·	1.5 km	MPC · JPL
391879	2008 TT_{139}	—	October 8, 2008	Mount Lemmon	Mount Lemmon Survey	·	1.4 km	MPC · JPL
391880	2008 TT_{141}	—	October 9, 2008	Mount Lemmon	Mount Lemmon Survey	L4	7.0 km	MPC · JPL
391881	2008 TW_{177}	—	October 9, 2008	Catalina	CSS	·	4.4 km	MPC · JPL
391882	2008 TT_{180}	—	October 4, 2008	La Sagra	OAM	V	600 m	MPC · JPL
391883	2008 UW_{2}	—	October 22, 2008	Socorro	LINEAR	·	2.6 km	MPC · JPL
391884	2008 UC_{27}	—	September 25, 2008	Kitt Peak	Spacewatch	·	1.7 km	MPC · JPL
391885	2008 UL_{29}	—	May 2, 2006	Mount Lemmon	Mount Lemmon Survey	·	2.0 km	MPC · JPL
391886	2008 UH_{30}	—	October 20, 2008	Kitt Peak	Spacewatch	(5)	910 m	MPC · JPL
391887	2008 UH_{38}	—	October 20, 2008	Kitt Peak	Spacewatch	·	1.8 km	MPC · JPL
391888	2008 UD_{51}	—	October 20, 2008	Kitt Peak	Spacewatch	EOS	2.2 km	MPC · JPL
391889	2008 UY_{53}	—	October 20, 2008	Kitt Peak	Spacewatch	·	1.7 km	MPC · JPL
391890	2008 UZ_{54}	—	October 20, 2008	Lulin	LUSS	·	1.2 km	MPC · JPL
391891	2008 UA_{59}	—	October 21, 2008	Kitt Peak	Spacewatch	·	1.3 km	MPC · JPL
391892	2008 UQ_{69}	—	September 23, 2008	Mount Lemmon	Mount Lemmon Survey	HOF	2.5 km	MPC · JPL
391893	2008 UX_{76}	—	October 3, 2008	Mount Lemmon	Mount Lemmon Survey	·	1.1 km	MPC · JPL
391894	2008 UE_{78}	—	October 21, 2008	Kitt Peak	Spacewatch	·	1.3 km	MPC · JPL
391895	2008 UX_{80}	—	September 22, 2008	Kitt Peak	Spacewatch	·	870 m	MPC · JPL
391896	2008 UA_{91}	—	October 24, 2008	Socorro	LINEAR	·	1.6 km	MPC · JPL
391897	2008 UK_{92}	—	October 23, 2008	Socorro	LINEAR	·	1.6 km	MPC · JPL
391898	2008 UM_{94}	—	October 27, 2008	Mount Lemmon	Mount Lemmon Survey	·	2.4 km	MPC · JPL
391899	2008 UC_{97}	—	October 25, 2008	Socorro	LINEAR	·	1.6 km	MPC · JPL
391900	2008 UC_{112}	—	October 22, 2008	Kitt Peak	Spacewatch	V	820 m	MPC · JPL

== 391901–392000 ==
back to top

Designation			Discovery			Properties		Ref
Permanent	Provisional	Named after	Date	Site	Discoverer(s)	Category	Diam.	Ref
391901	2008 UC_{113}	—	October 22, 2008	Kitt Peak	Spacewatch	·	1.5 km	MPC · JPL
391902	2008 UT_{115}	—	October 22, 2008	Kitt Peak	Spacewatch	·	1.1 km	MPC · JPL
391903	2008 UF_{116}	—	October 22, 2008	Kitt Peak	Spacewatch	·	1.1 km	MPC · JPL
391904	2008 UV_{126}	—	October 22, 2008	Mount Lemmon	Mount Lemmon Survey	EUN	1.4 km	MPC · JPL
391905	2008 UJ_{127}	—	October 22, 2008	Kitt Peak	Spacewatch	·	1.2 km	MPC · JPL
391906	2008 UX_{127}	—	October 22, 2008	Kitt Peak	Spacewatch	·	1.3 km	MPC · JPL
391907	2008 UU_{146}	—	October 23, 2008	Kitt Peak	Spacewatch	V	650 m	MPC · JPL
391908	2008 UF_{154}	—	September 9, 2008	Mount Lemmon	Mount Lemmon Survey	·	3.2 km	MPC · JPL
391909	2008 UY_{163}	—	October 10, 2008	Mount Lemmon	Mount Lemmon Survey	(5)	1.0 km	MPC · JPL
391910	2008 UK_{175}	—	October 24, 2008	Mount Lemmon	Mount Lemmon Survey	·	1.1 km	MPC · JPL
391911	2008 UT_{182}	—	December 26, 2005	Kitt Peak	Spacewatch	MAS	860 m	MPC · JPL
391912	2008 UL_{184}	—	September 9, 2008	Mount Lemmon	Mount Lemmon Survey	·	1.2 km	MPC · JPL
391913	2008 UW_{188}	—	March 15, 2007	Kitt Peak	Spacewatch	·	890 m	MPC · JPL
391914	2008 UP_{196}	—	October 27, 2008	Kitt Peak	Spacewatch	·	1.2 km	MPC · JPL
391915	2008 UW_{203}	—	October 28, 2008	Socorro	LINEAR	·	2.0 km	MPC · JPL
391916	2008 UJ_{204}	—	October 28, 2008	Socorro	LINEAR	·	1.2 km	MPC · JPL
391917	2008 UD_{209}	—	October 23, 2008	Kitt Peak	Spacewatch	·	1.2 km	MPC · JPL
391918	2008 UR_{210}	—	October 23, 2008	Kitt Peak	Spacewatch	·	1.1 km	MPC · JPL
391919	2008 UD_{228}	—	October 25, 2008	Kitt Peak	Spacewatch	·	2.2 km	MPC · JPL
391920	2008 UR_{243}	—	October 26, 2008	Kitt Peak	Spacewatch	·	1.4 km	MPC · JPL
391921	2008 UZ_{258}	—	October 20, 2008	Kitt Peak	Spacewatch	·	1.1 km	MPC · JPL
391922	2008 UF_{267}	—	October 28, 2008	Kitt Peak	Spacewatch	·	860 m	MPC · JPL
391923	2008 UC_{282}	—	October 28, 2008	Kitt Peak	Spacewatch	·	1.4 km	MPC · JPL
391924	2008 UR_{284}	—	September 25, 2008	Kitt Peak	Spacewatch	(5)	1.1 km	MPC · JPL
391925	2008 UU_{291}	—	October 29, 2008	Kitt Peak	Spacewatch	·	740 m	MPC · JPL
391926	2008 UV_{292}	—	November 22, 2005	Kitt Peak	Spacewatch	V	780 m	MPC · JPL
391927	2008 UH_{296}	—	October 29, 2008	Kitt Peak	Spacewatch	·	980 m	MPC · JPL
391928	2008 UV_{302}	—	October 21, 2008	Kitt Peak	Spacewatch	·	1.6 km	MPC · JPL
391929	2008 UR_{303}	—	October 29, 2008	Kitt Peak	Spacewatch	(5)	1.8 km	MPC · JPL
391930	2008 UG_{304}	—	October 29, 2008	Kitt Peak	Spacewatch	·	1.3 km	MPC · JPL
391931	2008 UL_{330}	—	October 31, 2008	Kitt Peak	Spacewatch	·	1.2 km	MPC · JPL
391932	2008 UW_{338}	—	October 22, 2008	Kitt Peak	Spacewatch	·	1.5 km	MPC · JPL
391933	2008 UE_{345}	—	October 31, 2008	Kitt Peak	Spacewatch	(5)	1.5 km	MPC · JPL
391934	2008 UT_{350}	—	September 7, 2008	Mount Lemmon	Mount Lemmon Survey	·	1.3 km	MPC · JPL
391935	2008 UV_{351}	—	October 24, 2008	Mount Lemmon	Mount Lemmon Survey	·	2.0 km	MPC · JPL
391936	2008 UQ_{354}	—	October 27, 2008	Mount Lemmon	Mount Lemmon Survey	·	1.6 km	MPC · JPL
391937	2008 UE_{358}	—	October 25, 2008	Kitt Peak	Spacewatch	·	1.5 km	MPC · JPL
391938	2008 UY_{366}	—	October 24, 2008	Socorro	LINEAR	·	840 m	MPC · JPL
391939	2008 VD_{1}	—	November 1, 2008	Socorro	LINEAR	MAR	1.7 km	MPC · JPL
391940	2008 VR_{32}	—	November 2, 2008	Mount Lemmon	Mount Lemmon Survey	·	1.3 km	MPC · JPL
391941	2008 VD_{34}	—	September 27, 2008	Mount Lemmon	Mount Lemmon Survey	(5)	1.1 km	MPC · JPL
391942	2008 VU_{39}	—	November 2, 2008	Kitt Peak	Spacewatch	·	1.2 km	MPC · JPL
391943	2008 VT_{47}	—	November 3, 2008	Mount Lemmon	Mount Lemmon Survey	·	1.3 km	MPC · JPL
391944	2008 VZ_{50}	—	November 4, 2008	Kitt Peak	Spacewatch	·	1.4 km	MPC · JPL
391945	2008 VV_{59}	—	November 7, 2008	Catalina	CSS	(5)	1.2 km	MPC · JPL
391946	2008 VG_{71}	—	November 2, 2008	Socorro	LINEAR	EUN	1.2 km	MPC · JPL
391947 Tanithlee	2008 VQ_{72}	Tanithlee	November 8, 2008	Mount Lemmon	Mount Lemmon Survey	·	1.4 km	MPC · JPL
391948	2008 VA_{76}	—	November 1, 2008	Mount Lemmon	Mount Lemmon Survey	·	1.5 km	MPC · JPL
391949	2008 VF_{78}	—	November 7, 2008	Mount Lemmon	Mount Lemmon Survey	·	1.6 km	MPC · JPL
391950	2008 WE_{3}	—	November 17, 2008	Kitt Peak	Spacewatch	·	1.2 km	MPC · JPL
391951	2008 WK_{10}	—	November 18, 2008	La Sagra	OAM	·	1.6 km	MPC · JPL
391952	2008 WP_{14}	—	November 17, 2008	Kitt Peak	Spacewatch	PHO	2.4 km	MPC · JPL
391953	2008 WD_{18}	—	November 17, 2008	Kitt Peak	Spacewatch	(5)	1.0 km	MPC · JPL
391954	2008 WC_{19}	—	November 17, 2008	Kitt Peak	Spacewatch	·	1.2 km	MPC · JPL
391955	2008 WV_{32}	—	November 20, 2008	Mount Lemmon	Mount Lemmon Survey	·	2.6 km	MPC · JPL
391956	2008 WS_{38}	—	November 17, 2008	Kitt Peak	Spacewatch	MAS	1.0 km	MPC · JPL
391957	2008 WA_{46}	—	November 3, 2008	Kitt Peak	Spacewatch	PHO	1.1 km	MPC · JPL
391958	2008 WR_{50}	—	November 18, 2008	Kitt Peak	Spacewatch	·	1.2 km	MPC · JPL
391959	2008 WQ_{73}	—	November 19, 2008	Mount Lemmon	Mount Lemmon Survey	·	1.6 km	MPC · JPL
391960	2008 WO_{80}	—	November 20, 2008	Kitt Peak	Spacewatch	(194)	1.8 km	MPC · JPL
391961	2008 WZ_{97}	—	November 19, 2008	Catalina	CSS	·	1.6 km	MPC · JPL
391962	2008 WA_{99}	—	November 24, 2008	Mount Lemmon	Mount Lemmon Survey	·	1.3 km	MPC · JPL
391963	2008 WE_{101}	—	November 26, 2008	La Sagra	OAM	·	2.3 km	MPC · JPL
391964	2008 WL_{110}	—	November 30, 2008	Kitt Peak	Spacewatch	·	1.4 km	MPC · JPL
391965	2008 WN_{111}	—	October 31, 2008	Kitt Peak	Spacewatch	(5)	1.2 km	MPC · JPL
391966	2008 WD_{124}	—	November 17, 2008	Kitt Peak	Spacewatch	·	3.3 km	MPC · JPL
391967	2008 WX_{125}	—	November 23, 2008	Mount Lemmon	Mount Lemmon Survey	·	1.9 km	MPC · JPL
391968	2008 WK_{130}	—	November 22, 2008	Kitt Peak	Spacewatch	·	2.4 km	MPC · JPL
391969	2008 WK_{132}	—	February 2, 2006	Kitt Peak	Spacewatch	·	1.4 km	MPC · JPL
391970	2008 WN_{134}	—	November 22, 2008	Kitt Peak	Spacewatch	·	1.3 km	MPC · JPL
391971	2008 WT_{136}	—	November 20, 2008	Kitt Peak	Spacewatch	·	1.7 km	MPC · JPL
391972	2008 WO_{140}	—	October 24, 2008	Catalina	CSS	·	1.5 km	MPC · JPL
391973	2008 XX_{16}	—	May 25, 2006	Mount Lemmon	Mount Lemmon Survey	·	1.3 km	MPC · JPL
391974	2008 XR_{19}	—	December 1, 2008	Kitt Peak	Spacewatch	·	1.7 km	MPC · JPL
391975	2008 XD_{32}	—	December 2, 2008	Kitt Peak	Spacewatch	·	1.3 km	MPC · JPL
391976	2008 XE_{35}	—	December 2, 2008	Kitt Peak	Spacewatch	·	1.6 km	MPC · JPL
391977	2008 XN_{45}	—	December 4, 2008	Kitt Peak	Spacewatch	·	1.2 km	MPC · JPL
391978	2008 XJ_{49}	—	December 7, 2008	Mount Lemmon	Mount Lemmon Survey	·	2.0 km	MPC · JPL
391979	2008 XX_{49}	—	December 4, 2008	Mount Lemmon	Mount Lemmon Survey	EOS	2.2 km	MPC · JPL
391980	2008 XD_{50}	—	April 14, 2001	Kitt Peak	Spacewatch	·	1.8 km	MPC · JPL
391981	2008 XJ_{50}	—	December 4, 2008	Catalina	CSS	EUN	1.4 km	MPC · JPL
391982	2008 YK	—	December 18, 2008	Calar Alto	F. Hormuth	·	1.5 km	MPC · JPL
391983	2008 YP_{6}	—	December 22, 2008	Dauban	Kugel, F.	·	2.4 km	MPC · JPL
391984	2008 YO_{8}	—	December 21, 2008	Catalina	CSS	·	2.2 km	MPC · JPL
391985	2008 YH_{9}	—	December 23, 2008	Dauban	Kugel, F.	fast	1.2 km	MPC · JPL
391986	2008 YV_{16}	—	December 21, 2008	Mount Lemmon	Mount Lemmon Survey	·	2.0 km	MPC · JPL
391987	2008 YA_{24}	—	December 21, 2008	Catalina	CSS	(5)	1.7 km	MPC · JPL
391988 Illmárton	2008 YF_{26}	Illmárton	December 27, 2008	Piszkéstető	K. Sárneczky	·	1.6 km	MPC · JPL
391989	2008 YH_{26}	—	November 19, 2008	Mount Lemmon	Mount Lemmon Survey	EUN	1.7 km	MPC · JPL
391990	2008 YG_{27}	—	December 22, 2008	Socorro	LINEAR	JUN	1.3 km	MPC · JPL
391991	2008 YW_{33}	—	December 28, 2008	Dauban	Kugel, F.	·	1.9 km	MPC · JPL
391992	2008 YU_{35}	—	December 22, 2008	Kitt Peak	Spacewatch	·	1.8 km	MPC · JPL
391993	2008 YB_{38}	—	December 27, 2008	Bergisch Gladbach	W. Bickel	·	2.8 km	MPC · JPL
391994	2008 YH_{49}	—	December 29, 2008	Mount Lemmon	Mount Lemmon Survey	·	1.5 km	MPC · JPL
391995	2008 YS_{73}	—	December 22, 2008	Kitt Peak	Spacewatch	·	1.3 km	MPC · JPL
391996 Zhunenghong	2008 YX_{84}	Zhunenghong	December 31, 2008	XuYi	PMO NEO Survey Program	·	4.3 km	MPC · JPL
391997	2008 YD_{86}	—	December 21, 2008	Kitt Peak	Spacewatch	·	1.6 km	MPC · JPL
391998	2008 YW_{114}	—	December 29, 2008	Kitt Peak	Spacewatch	·	3.0 km	MPC · JPL
391999	2008 YS_{116}	—	December 21, 2008	Mount Lemmon	Mount Lemmon Survey	NYS	1.4 km	MPC · JPL
392000	2008 YJ_{119}	—	December 29, 2008	Kitt Peak	Spacewatch	·	3.1 km	MPC · JPL

back to top

== See also ==
- Meanings of minor-planet names: 391001–392000
