= Meanings of minor-planet names: 391001–392000 =

As minor planet discoveries are confirmed, they are given a permanent number by the IAU's Minor Planet Center (MPC), and the discoverers can then submit names for them, following the IAU's naming conventions. The list below concerns those minor planets in the specified number-range that have received names, and explains the meanings of those names.

Official naming citations of newly named small Solar System bodies are approved and published in a bulletin by IAU's Working Group for Small Bodies Nomenclature (WGSBN). Before May 2021, citations were published in MPC's Minor Planet Circulars for many decades. Recent citations can also be found on the JPL Small-Body Database (SBDB). Until his death in 2016, German astronomer Lutz D. Schmadel compiled these citations into the Dictionary of Minor Planet Names (DMP) and regularly updated the collection.

Based on Paul Herget's The Names of the Minor Planets, Schmadel also researched the unclear origin of numerous asteroids, most of which had been named prior to World War II. This article incorporates text from this source, which is in the public domain: SBDB New namings may only be added to this list below after official publication as the preannouncement of names is condemned. The WGSBN publishes a comprehensive guideline for the naming rules of non-cometary small Solar System bodies.

== 391001–391100 ==
| Named minor planet | Provisional | This minor planet was named for... | Ref · Catalog |
|---|---|---|---|
| 391042 Dubietis | 2005 TP_{105} | Audrius Dubietis (b. 1964), a Lithuanian physicist. | IAU · 391042 |

== 391101–391200 ==
back to top

| Named minor planet | Provisional | This minor planet was named for... | Ref · Catalog |
|---|---|---|---|
There are no named minor planets in this number range

== 391201–391300 ==
back to top

| Named minor planet | Provisional | This minor planet was named for... | Ref · Catalog |
|---|---|---|---|
| 391257 Wilwheaton | 2006 RL_{1} | Wil Wheaton (born 1972), an American actor and writer | JPL · 391257 |

== 391301–391400 ==
back to top

| Named minor planet | Provisional | This minor planet was named for... | Ref · Catalog |
|---|---|---|---|
There are no named minor planets in this number range

== 391401–391500 ==
back to top

| Named minor planet | Provisional | This minor planet was named for... | Ref · Catalog |
|---|---|---|---|
| 391496 Colineldridge | 2007 PG_{9} | Colin Eldridge (b. 1941), an Australian amateur astronomer. | IAU · 391496 |

== 391501–391600 ==
back to top

| Named minor planet | Provisional | This minor planet was named for... | Ref · Catalog |
|---|---|---|---|
| 391532 Markdowning | 2007 RK_{282} | Mark Downing, expert in wavefront sensing CCDs used in state-of-the-art astronomical adaptive optics systems. | IAU · 391532 |

== 391601–391700 ==
back to top

| Named minor planet | Provisional | This minor planet was named for... | Ref · Catalog |
|---|---|---|---|
There are no named minor planets in this number range

== 391701–391800 ==
back to top

| Named minor planet | Provisional | This minor planet was named for... | Ref · Catalog |
|---|---|---|---|
| 391795 Univofutah | 2008 RV_{77} | The University of Utah is the flagship institution of higher learning in Utah, United States. | JPL · 391795 |

== 391801–391900 ==
back to top

| Named minor planet | Provisional | This minor planet was named for... | Ref · Catalog |
|---|---|---|---|
There are no named minor planets in this number range

== 391901–392000 ==
back to top

| Named minor planet | Provisional | This minor planet was named for... | Ref · Catalog |
|---|---|---|---|
| 391947 Tanithlee | 2008 VQ_{72} | Tanith Lee (1947–2015) was a British science-fiction and fantasy writer. Despite not learning to read until age 8 due to a learning disability (dyslexia), she became a prolific author and wrote numerous award-winning novels and short stories. | IAU · 391947 |
| 391988 Illmárton | 2008 YF_{26} | Márton Ill (1930–2015), a Hungarian astronomer and space scientist. | JPL · 391988 |
| 391996 Zhunenghong | 2008 YX_{84} | Zhu Nenghong (b. 1939), an academician of Chinese Academy of Engineering, is an expert in research and development of astronomical instruments in China. He led the development of numerous major astronomical telescopes including the Purple Mountain Observatory's 1.56-m astrometric telescope. | IAU · 391996 |

back to top

| Preceded by 390,001–391,000 | Meanings of minor-planet names List of minor planets: 391,001–392,000 | Succeeded by 392,001–393,000 |
