= (391211) 2006 HZ51 =

Bright sub-kilometer asteroid

(391211) 2006 HZ_{51}
Discovery
- Discovered by: Catalina Sky Srvy.
- Discovery site: Mount Lemmon Obs.
- Discovery date: 27 April 2006

Designations
- Minor planet category: Amor · NEO · PHA

Orbital characteristics
- Epoch 4 September 2017 (JD 2458000.5)
- Uncertainty parameter 0
- Observation arc: 16.10 yr (5,882 days)
- Aphelion: 2.7511 AU
- Perihelion: 1.0438 AU
- Semi-major axis: 1.8974 AU
- Eccentricity: 0.4499
- Orbital period (sidereal): 2.61 yr (955 days)
- Mean anomaly: 86.571°
- Mean motion: 0° 22^{m} 37.56^{s} / day
- Inclination: 12.412°
- Longitude of ascending node: 84.291°
- Argument of perihelion: 193.34°
- Earth MOID: 0.0354 AU (13.8 LD)

Physical characteristics
- Mean diameter: 0.412±0.089 km 0.8 km (estimate)
- Geometric albedo: 0.415±0.233
- Absolute magnitude (H): 18.5

(391211) 2006 HZ_{51} is a bright, sub-kilometer asteroid on an eccentric orbit, classified as a near-Earth object and a potentially hazardous asteroid of the Amor group. It was discovered on 27 April 2006, by astronomers of the Catalina Sky Survey conducted at Mount Lemmon Observatory, Arizona, United States. During preliminary observations, it was thought to have a small chance of impacting Earth in 2008. The asteroid measures approximately half a kilometer in diameter and has an exceptionally high albedo.

== Orbit and classification ==
2006 HZ_{51} is an Amor asteroid – a subgroup of near-Earth asteroids that approach the orbit of Earth from beyond, but do not cross it.

It orbits the Sun at a distance of 1.04–2.75 AU once every 2 years and 7 months (955 days; semi-major axis of 1.90 AU). Its orbit has an eccentricity of 0.45 and an inclination of 12° with respect to the ecliptic. The body's observation arc begins with a precovery taken by NEAT at Palomar Observatory in October 2001. With an aphelion of 2.75 AU, and typical for members of the Amor group, this asteroid is also a Mars-crosser, crossing the orbit of the Red Planet at 1.666 AU.

=== Close approaches ===
2006 HZ_{51} has a minimum orbital intersection distance (MOID) with Earth of 5,290,000 km (0.035385 AU), which translates into 13.8 lunar distances.

This makes it a potentially hazardous asteroid, a body with a threatening close approach to the Earth, due to its low MOID and large size (absolute magnitude of 18.5). Such asteroids are defined to have an absolute magnitude of 22 or brighter – which generically corresponds to a diameter of approximately 140 meters – and a MOID that is smaller than 0.05 AU or 19.5 LD.

Based on a short observation arc of only 1.1 days, it was originally thought to have a 1 in 6 million chance of hitting Earth on 21 June 2008. Further refinement of the orbit quickly eliminated the risk. The preliminary 2-day orbit solution on 28 April 2006 was at first thought to have a period of 7 years and a perihelion of approximately 1.1 AU (MPEC 2006-H58).

== Physical characteristics ==
=== Diameter and albedo ===
According to the survey carried out by the NEOWISE mission of NASA's Wide-field Infrared Survey Explorer, 2006 HZ_{51} measures 412 meters in diameter and its surface has an exceptionally high albedo of 0.415. Other source give an estimated diameter of 800 meters.

=== Rotation period ===
As of 2018, n rotational lightcurve of 2006 HZ_{51} has been obtained from photometric observations. The body's rotation period, pole and shape remains unknown.

== Naming ==
This minor planet has not yet been named.
