= List of minor planets: 390001–391000 =

The following is a partial list of minor planets, running from minor-planet number 390001 through 391000, inclusive. The primary data for this and other partial lists is based on JPL's "Small-Body Orbital Elements" and data available from the Minor Planet Center. Critical list information is also provided by the MPC, unless otherwise specified from Lowell Observatory. A detailed description of the table's columns and additional sources are given on the main page including a complete list of every page in this series, and a statistical break-up on the dynamical classification of minor planets.

Also see the summary list of all named bodies in numerical and alphabetical order, and the corresponding naming citations for the number range of this particular list. New namings may only be added to this list after official publication, as the preannouncement of names is condemned by the Working Group for Small Bodies Nomenclature of the International Astronomical Union.

Near-Earth obj.	MBA (inner)	MBA (outer)	Centaur
Mars-crosser	MBA (middle)	Jupiter trojan	Trans-Neptunian obj.
Unclassified

== 390001–390100 ==
Designation			Discovery			Properties		Ref
Permanent	Provisional	Named after	Date	Site	Discoverer(s)	Category	Diam.	Ref
390001	2012 TD_{303}	—	January 16, 2005	Socorro	LINEAR	·	1.8 km	MPC · JPL
390002	2012 TN_{303}	—	October 7, 2004	Kitt Peak	Spacewatch	·	1.2 km	MPC · JPL
390003	2012 TH_{307}	—	May 10, 2005	Kitt Peak	Spacewatch	·	2.2 km	MPC · JPL
390004	2012 TT_{310}	—	September 26, 1998	Kitt Peak	Spacewatch	DOR	2.8 km	MPC · JPL
390005	2012 TC_{311}	—	January 22, 1993	Kitt Peak	Spacewatch	·	1.3 km	MPC · JPL
390006	2012 TD_{312}	—	August 28, 2005	Kitt Peak	Spacewatch	·	1.1 km	MPC · JPL
390007	2012 TK_{312}	—	April 16, 2004	Kitt Peak	Spacewatch	EOS	2.4 km	MPC · JPL
390008	2012 TW_{312}	—	November 14, 1998	Kitt Peak	Spacewatch	GEF	1.5 km	MPC · JPL
390009	2012 TX_{313}	—	December 30, 2008	Catalina	CSS	·	2.6 km	MPC · JPL
390010	2012 TR_{314}	—	August 24, 2007	Kitt Peak	Spacewatch	·	1.6 km	MPC · JPL
390011	2012 TR_{315}	—	November 20, 2003	Socorro	LINEAR	·	2.4 km	MPC · JPL
390012	2012 TQ_{317}	—	April 19, 2006	Kitt Peak	Spacewatch	·	1.4 km	MPC · JPL
390013	2012 TS_{317}	—	April 19, 2006	Kitt Peak	Spacewatch	·	1.7 km	MPC · JPL
390014	2012 TS_{318}	—	March 18, 2009	Kitt Peak	Spacewatch	·	3.4 km	MPC · JPL
390015	2012 UN	—	April 25, 2003	Kitt Peak	Spacewatch	MAS	920 m	MPC · JPL
390016	2012 UH_{3}	—	November 6, 2008	Catalina	CSS	·	1.7 km	MPC · JPL
390017	2012 UB_{11}	—	March 4, 2005	Mount Lemmon	Mount Lemmon Survey	AGN	790 m	MPC · JPL
390018	2012 UE_{14}	—	October 18, 2007	Mount Lemmon	Mount Lemmon Survey	KOR	1.2 km	MPC · JPL
390019	2012 UJ_{15}	—	December 5, 2005	Kitt Peak	Spacewatch	NYS	1.2 km	MPC · JPL
390020	2012 UY_{18}	—	November 7, 2008	Mount Lemmon	Mount Lemmon Survey	·	1.3 km	MPC · JPL
390021	2012 UN_{29}	—	December 3, 2008	Mount Lemmon	Mount Lemmon Survey	·	2.3 km	MPC · JPL
390022	2012 UX_{29}	—	January 27, 2007	Kitt Peak	Spacewatch	·	860 m	MPC · JPL
390023	2012 US_{30}	—	October 20, 2003	Kitt Peak	Spacewatch	·	1.9 km	MPC · JPL
390024	2012 UQ_{31}	—	June 27, 2011	Kitt Peak	Spacewatch	·	3.0 km	MPC · JPL
390025	2012 UY_{32}	—	October 31, 2008	Catalina	CSS	HNS	1.2 km	MPC · JPL
390026	2012 UH_{33}	—	October 3, 2003	Kitt Peak	Spacewatch	NEM	2.3 km	MPC · JPL
390027	2012 UE_{35}	—	September 18, 2007	Mount Lemmon	Mount Lemmon Survey	·	2.0 km	MPC · JPL
390028	2012 UA_{38}	—	March 14, 2007	Kitt Peak	Spacewatch	·	990 m	MPC · JPL
390029	2012 UZ_{40}	—	November 18, 1995	Kitt Peak	Spacewatch	·	2.0 km	MPC · JPL
390030	2012 UB_{41}	—	August 24, 2007	Kitt Peak	Spacewatch	·	1.8 km	MPC · JPL
390031	2012 UL_{41}	—	September 15, 2012	Kitt Peak	Spacewatch	·	1.9 km	MPC · JPL
390032	2012 UC_{42}	—	September 22, 2008	Kitt Peak	Spacewatch	·	1.6 km	MPC · JPL
390033	2012 UP_{47}	—	September 14, 2007	Catalina	CSS	·	2.5 km	MPC · JPL
390034	2012 UG_{51}	—	November 30, 2008	Mount Lemmon	Mount Lemmon Survey	·	1.1 km	MPC · JPL
390035	2012 UO_{54}	—	July 1, 2008	Kitt Peak	Spacewatch	·	1.3 km	MPC · JPL
390036	2012 UR_{54}	—	October 9, 2007	Kitt Peak	Spacewatch	·	2.5 km	MPC · JPL
390037	2012 UE_{55}	—	November 6, 2005	Kitt Peak	Spacewatch	·	1.3 km	MPC · JPL
390038	2012 UM_{56}	—	January 13, 2005	Kitt Peak	Spacewatch	NEM	2.5 km	MPC · JPL
390039	2012 UC_{57}	—	November 19, 2001	Socorro	LINEAR	·	2.8 km	MPC · JPL
390040	2012 UE_{57}	—	October 15, 2007	Mount Lemmon	Mount Lemmon Survey	·	2.2 km	MPC · JPL
390041	2012 UP_{58}	—	September 18, 2007	Mount Lemmon	Mount Lemmon Survey	EMA	3.0 km	MPC · JPL
390042	2012 UB_{59}	—	September 17, 2003	Kitt Peak	Spacewatch	·	1.9 km	MPC · JPL
390043	2012 UU_{59}	—	June 3, 2011	Mount Lemmon	Mount Lemmon Survey	WIT	1.1 km	MPC · JPL
390044	2012 UA_{62}	—	November 1, 2007	Kitt Peak	Spacewatch	·	3.0 km	MPC · JPL
390045	2012 UE_{62}	—	December 22, 2008	Mount Lemmon	Mount Lemmon Survey	·	2.2 km	MPC · JPL
390046	2012 UC_{67}	—	October 18, 2003	Anderson Mesa	LONEOS	·	2.9 km	MPC · JPL
390047	2012 UD_{69}	—	October 5, 2000	Kitt Peak	Spacewatch	EUN	1.4 km	MPC · JPL
390048	2012 UN_{69}	—	October 30, 2005	Kitt Peak	Spacewatch	(2076)	900 m	MPC · JPL
390049	2012 UF_{72}	—	September 16, 2012	Kitt Peak	Spacewatch	·	1.8 km	MPC · JPL
390050	2012 UU_{72}	—	August 10, 2007	Kitt Peak	Spacewatch	AST	1.4 km	MPC · JPL
390051	2012 UM_{73}	—	September 15, 2006	Kitt Peak	Spacewatch	THM	2.1 km	MPC · JPL
390052	2012 UP_{73}	—	March 26, 2007	Kitt Peak	Spacewatch	·	1.1 km	MPC · JPL
390053	2012 UA_{76}	—	October 20, 1995	Kitt Peak	Spacewatch	·	2.3 km	MPC · JPL
390054	2012 UH_{76}	—	October 17, 2003	Kitt Peak	Spacewatch	·	1.4 km	MPC · JPL
390055	2012 UZ_{81}	—	March 8, 2005	Mount Lemmon	Mount Lemmon Survey	·	1.9 km	MPC · JPL
390056	2012 UK_{84}	—	September 6, 2008	Catalina	CSS	·	1.3 km	MPC · JPL
390057	2012 UR_{87}	—	April 14, 2007	Kitt Peak	Spacewatch	·	1.2 km	MPC · JPL
390058	2012 UE_{88}	—	December 12, 2004	Kitt Peak	Spacewatch	·	1.1 km	MPC · JPL
390059	2012 UG_{88}	—	October 12, 1999	Kitt Peak	Spacewatch	·	1.7 km	MPC · JPL
390060	2012 UK_{88}	—	October 14, 2001	Kitt Peak	Spacewatch	·	2.0 km	MPC · JPL
390061	2012 UL_{90}	—	March 9, 2007	Kitt Peak	Spacewatch	NYS	1.3 km	MPC · JPL
390062	2012 UX_{94}	—	November 6, 2005	Mount Lemmon	Mount Lemmon Survey	·	1.6 km	MPC · JPL
390063	2012 UE_{96}	—	October 1, 2008	Kitt Peak	Spacewatch	·	1.1 km	MPC · JPL
390064	2012 UF_{98}	—	October 19, 2006	Catalina	CSS	·	4.6 km	MPC · JPL
390065	2012 UV_{100}	—	April 22, 2004	Kitt Peak	Spacewatch	·	3.3 km	MPC · JPL
390066	2012 UT_{102}	—	March 17, 2007	Kitt Peak	Spacewatch	·	1.2 km	MPC · JPL
390067	2012 UO_{104}	—	December 13, 2004	Kitt Peak	Spacewatch	·	2.1 km	MPC · JPL
390068	2012 UX_{106}	—	September 29, 2005	Mount Lemmon	Mount Lemmon Survey	·	970 m	MPC · JPL
390069	2012 UG_{108}	—	October 19, 2003	Kitt Peak	Spacewatch	·	2.2 km	MPC · JPL
390070	2012 UA_{110}	—	February 3, 2000	Kitt Peak	Spacewatch	·	880 m	MPC · JPL
390071	2012 UU_{113}	—	September 3, 2008	Kitt Peak	Spacewatch	·	1.4 km	MPC · JPL
390072	2012 UQ_{116}	—	October 29, 2005	Kitt Peak	Spacewatch	·	950 m	MPC · JPL
390073	2012 UU_{117}	—	September 28, 2003	Kitt Peak	Spacewatch	·	1.8 km	MPC · JPL
390074	2012 UP_{122}	—	January 28, 2009	Catalina	CSS	DOR	2.4 km	MPC · JPL
390075	2012 UT_{123}	—	November 9, 2007	Kitt Peak	Spacewatch	·	2.8 km	MPC · JPL
390076	2012 UH_{126}	—	March 12, 2005	Kitt Peak	Spacewatch	·	2.2 km	MPC · JPL
390077	2012 UC_{128}	—	December 31, 2008	Kitt Peak	Spacewatch	·	1.9 km	MPC · JPL
390078	2012 UV_{130}	—	October 18, 2003	Kitt Peak	Spacewatch	·	2.1 km	MPC · JPL
390079	2012 US_{131}	—	September 22, 2008	Mount Lemmon	Mount Lemmon Survey	·	1.1 km	MPC · JPL
390080	2012 UM_{132}	—	February 18, 2010	Kitt Peak	Spacewatch	·	1.7 km	MPC · JPL
390081	2012 UQ_{136}	—	January 31, 2006	Kitt Peak	Spacewatch	(5)	1.9 km	MPC · JPL
390082	2012 UM_{137}	—	October 2, 2003	Kitt Peak	Spacewatch	·	1.5 km	MPC · JPL
390083	2012 UW_{140}	—	March 13, 2010	Mount Lemmon	Mount Lemmon Survey	·	1.5 km	MPC · JPL
390084	2012 UC_{148}	—	April 21, 2006	Kitt Peak	Spacewatch	·	2.2 km	MPC · JPL
390085	2012 UU_{148}	—	November 25, 2005	Mount Lemmon	Mount Lemmon Survey	T_{j} (2.97)	2.9 km	MPC · JPL
390086	2012 UJ_{151}	—	December 1, 2008	Mount Lemmon	Mount Lemmon Survey	·	1.5 km	MPC · JPL
390087	2012 UC_{152}	—	November 14, 2007	Kitt Peak	Spacewatch	·	2.3 km	MPC · JPL
390088	2012 UJ_{152}	—	September 19, 2006	Kitt Peak	Spacewatch	·	2.9 km	MPC · JPL
390089	2012 UO_{152}	—	April 20, 2010	Kitt Peak	Spacewatch	·	2.6 km	MPC · JPL
390090	2012 UF_{155}	—	March 8, 2005	Anderson Mesa	LONEOS	MRX	1.1 km	MPC · JPL
390091	2012 UA_{156}	—	September 30, 2003	Kitt Peak	Spacewatch	·	2.1 km	MPC · JPL
390092	2012 UG_{156}	—	November 24, 2003	Kitt Peak	Spacewatch	AGN	1.0 km	MPC · JPL
390093	2012 UL_{156}	—	February 21, 2009	Kitt Peak	Spacewatch	·	2.0 km	MPC · JPL
390094	2012 UF_{160}	—	April 18, 2002	Kitt Peak	Spacewatch	·	2.0 km	MPC · JPL
390095	2012 UK_{161}	—	November 1, 2007	Kitt Peak	Spacewatch	·	1.6 km	MPC · JPL
390096	2012 UG_{162}	—	September 22, 2003	Kitt Peak	Spacewatch	·	1.5 km	MPC · JPL
390097	2012 UQ_{163}	—	September 9, 2007	Kitt Peak	Spacewatch	WIT	1.1 km	MPC · JPL
390098	2012 UF_{168}	—	March 17, 2001	Kitt Peak	Spacewatch	JUN	1.3 km	MPC · JPL
390099	2012 UQ_{168}	—	February 1, 2009	Kitt Peak	Spacewatch	EOS	1.7 km	MPC · JPL
390100	2012 VG_{9}	—	September 30, 1997	Kitt Peak	Spacewatch	·	1.5 km	MPC · JPL

== 390101–390200 ==
back to top

Designation			Discovery			Properties		Ref
Permanent	Provisional	Named after	Date	Site	Discoverer(s)	Category	Diam.	Ref
390101	2012 VR_{10}	—	June 11, 2010	Mount Lemmon	Mount Lemmon Survey	EOS	2.3 km	MPC · JPL
390102	2012 VC_{17}	—	November 5, 2012	Kitt Peak	Spacewatch	·	3.3 km	MPC · JPL
390103	2012 VY_{17}	—	December 15, 2007	Kitt Peak	Spacewatch	·	2.2 km	MPC · JPL
390104	2012 VQ_{19}	—	April 17, 2001	Kitt Peak	Spacewatch	·	2.3 km	MPC · JPL
390105	2012 VJ_{25}	—	October 23, 2008	Kitt Peak	Spacewatch	·	1.2 km	MPC · JPL
390106	2012 VN_{26}	—	October 1, 2003	Kitt Peak	Spacewatch	·	1.8 km	MPC · JPL
390107	2012 VZ_{29}	—	November 19, 2009	Mount Lemmon	Mount Lemmon Survey	·	1.1 km	MPC · JPL
390108	2012 VS_{30}	—	November 19, 2001	Socorro	LINEAR	V	810 m	MPC · JPL
390109	2012 VW_{30}	—	February 28, 2009	Mount Lemmon	Mount Lemmon Survey	·	1.8 km	MPC · JPL
390110	2012 VY_{30}	—	November 3, 2007	Kitt Peak	Spacewatch	EOS	2.1 km	MPC · JPL
390111	2012 VP_{33}	—	December 19, 2004	Mount Lemmon	Mount Lemmon Survey	·	1.2 km	MPC · JPL
390112	2012 VE_{34}	—	December 2, 2004	Kitt Peak	Spacewatch	·	1.6 km	MPC · JPL
390113	2012 VW_{34}	—	April 13, 2011	Mount Lemmon	Mount Lemmon Survey	·	1.3 km	MPC · JPL
390114	2012 VW_{35}	—	March 11, 1996	Kitt Peak	Spacewatch	NEM	2.5 km	MPC · JPL
390115	2012 VX_{38}	—	December 18, 2001	Socorro	LINEAR	·	960 m	MPC · JPL
390116	2012 VF_{40}	—	December 4, 2005	Kitt Peak	Spacewatch	·	1.1 km	MPC · JPL
390117	2012 VQ_{43}	—	November 16, 1995	Kitt Peak	Spacewatch	·	1.2 km	MPC · JPL
390118	2012 VK_{44}	—	March 26, 2006	Kitt Peak	Spacewatch	·	1.5 km	MPC · JPL
390119	2012 VC_{45}	—	January 27, 2003	Socorro	LINEAR	·	2.6 km	MPC · JPL
390120	2012 VG_{45}	—	November 2, 2007	Mount Lemmon	Mount Lemmon Survey	·	2.0 km	MPC · JPL
390121	2012 VL_{45}	—	October 28, 2008	Mount Lemmon	Mount Lemmon Survey	(5)	1.4 km	MPC · JPL
390122	2012 VE_{48}	—	September 18, 2003	Kitt Peak	Spacewatch	·	1.8 km	MPC · JPL
390123	2012 VQ_{53}	—	November 9, 1999	Kitt Peak	Spacewatch	·	1.6 km	MPC · JPL
390124	2012 VY_{53}	—	November 18, 2007	Mount Lemmon	Mount Lemmon Survey	·	1.6 km	MPC · JPL
390125	2012 VH_{57}	—	March 13, 2005	Kitt Peak	Spacewatch	AGN	1.3 km	MPC · JPL
390126	2012 VN_{59}	—	April 9, 2010	Kitt Peak	Spacewatch	·	2.0 km	MPC · JPL
390127	2012 VQ_{59}	—	December 23, 2005	Kitt Peak	Spacewatch	·	970 m	MPC · JPL
390128	2012 VF_{60}	—	November 27, 2009	Mount Lemmon	Mount Lemmon Survey	·	1.4 km	MPC · JPL
390129	2012 VV_{60}	—	April 3, 2003	Anderson Mesa	LONEOS	MAS	830 m	MPC · JPL
390130	2012 VW_{61}	—	September 29, 2003	Kitt Peak	Spacewatch	·	1.2 km	MPC · JPL
390131	2012 VW_{62}	—	January 16, 2005	Kitt Peak	Spacewatch	(5)	1.6 km	MPC · JPL
390132	2012 VY_{64}	—	October 29, 2005	Kitt Peak	Spacewatch	·	960 m	MPC · JPL
390133	2012 VJ_{68}	—	July 1, 2011	Kitt Peak	Spacewatch	·	1.2 km	MPC · JPL
390134	2012 VG_{71}	—	March 30, 2004	Kitt Peak	Spacewatch	TEL	1.3 km	MPC · JPL
390135	2012 VT_{72}	—	October 20, 2007	Mount Lemmon	Mount Lemmon Survey	KOR	1.4 km	MPC · JPL
390136	2012 VY_{72}	—	December 2, 2008	Mount Lemmon	Mount Lemmon Survey	·	1.9 km	MPC · JPL
390137	2012 VJ_{73}	—	January 13, 1996	Kitt Peak	Spacewatch	·	1.6 km	MPC · JPL
390138	2012 VQ_{74}	—	September 19, 1998	Caussols	ODAS	·	770 m	MPC · JPL
390139	2012 VO_{79}	—	October 29, 2005	Mount Lemmon	Mount Lemmon Survey	NYS	1.1 km	MPC · JPL
390140	2012 VK_{83}	—	November 30, 2008	Kitt Peak	Spacewatch	·	1.7 km	MPC · JPL
390141	2012 VQ_{83}	—	December 4, 2007	Mount Lemmon	Mount Lemmon Survey	THM	2.3 km	MPC · JPL
390142	2012 VC_{84}	—	February 1, 2005	Kitt Peak	Spacewatch	(17392)	1.4 km	MPC · JPL
390143	2012 VK_{84}	—	March 29, 2004	Kitt Peak	Spacewatch	·	2.1 km	MPC · JPL
390144	2012 VL_{84}	—	December 16, 2007	Kitt Peak	Spacewatch	·	3.0 km	MPC · JPL
390145	2012 VN_{85}	—	October 12, 2007	Mount Lemmon	Mount Lemmon Survey	·	1.5 km	MPC · JPL
390146	2012 VR_{85}	—	December 21, 2008	Catalina	CSS	EUN	1.3 km	MPC · JPL
390147	2012 VD_{86}	—	September 19, 2003	Kitt Peak	Spacewatch	·	1.6 km	MPC · JPL
390148	2012 VZ_{86}	—	March 8, 2005	Kitt Peak	Spacewatch	·	1.9 km	MPC · JPL
390149	2012 VB_{88}	—	March 31, 2009	Mount Lemmon	Mount Lemmon Survey	·	4.2 km	MPC · JPL
390150	2012 VE_{88}	—	June 10, 2011	Mount Lemmon	Mount Lemmon Survey	RAF	1.3 km	MPC · JPL
390151	2012 VF_{88}	—	November 15, 1995	Kitt Peak	Spacewatch	·	1.3 km	MPC · JPL
390152	2012 VP_{88}	—	December 31, 2008	Mount Lemmon	Mount Lemmon Survey	·	2.1 km	MPC · JPL
390153	2012 VF_{89}	—	November 19, 2003	Kitt Peak	Spacewatch	·	1.8 km	MPC · JPL
390154	2012 VJ_{91}	—	October 9, 2007	Mount Lemmon	Mount Lemmon Survey	KOR	1.2 km	MPC · JPL
390155	2012 VG_{93}	—	October 10, 2007	Mount Lemmon	Mount Lemmon Survey	·	2.1 km	MPC · JPL
390156	2012 VK_{93}	—	April 2, 2005	Mount Lemmon	Mount Lemmon Survey	AGN	1.0 km	MPC · JPL
390157	2012 VX_{95}	—	September 13, 2007	Mount Lemmon	Mount Lemmon Survey	·	1.7 km	MPC · JPL
390158	2012 VD_{97}	—	July 28, 2011	Siding Spring	SSS	TEL	1.8 km	MPC · JPL
390159	2012 VS_{98}	—	October 10, 2012	Catalina	CSS	(5)	1.6 km	MPC · JPL
390160	2012 VE_{101}	—	October 21, 2003	Kitt Peak	Spacewatch	·	2.2 km	MPC · JPL
390161	2012 VH_{101}	—	April 6, 2005	Mount Lemmon	Mount Lemmon Survey	KOR	1.5 km	MPC · JPL
390162	2012 VJ_{101}	—	April 2, 2006	Kitt Peak	Spacewatch	·	1.2 km	MPC · JPL
390163	2012 VM_{101}	—	October 15, 2007	Mount Lemmon	Mount Lemmon Survey	·	1.4 km	MPC · JPL
390164	2012 VO_{101}	—	January 9, 2006	Kitt Peak	Spacewatch	T_{j} (2.99) · 3:2	3.3 km	MPC · JPL
390165	2012 VG_{102}	—	December 1, 2003	Kitt Peak	Spacewatch	·	1.8 km	MPC · JPL
390166	2012 VJ_{102}	—	October 15, 2007	Kitt Peak	Spacewatch	·	2.0 km	MPC · JPL
390167	2012 VN_{103}	—	December 5, 2008	Kitt Peak	Spacewatch	·	1.4 km	MPC · JPL
390168	2012 VS_{103}	—	October 10, 2007	Mount Lemmon	Mount Lemmon Survey	·	2.1 km	MPC · JPL
390169	2012 VC_{104}	—	October 11, 1997	Kitt Peak	Spacewatch	·	2.1 km	MPC · JPL
390170	2012 VY_{106}	—	September 13, 2007	Mount Lemmon	Mount Lemmon Survey	·	1.9 km	MPC · JPL
390171	2012 VE_{107}	—	September 18, 2003	Kitt Peak	Spacewatch	·	1.7 km	MPC · JPL
390172	2012 VP_{107}	—	September 14, 2007	Mount Lemmon	Mount Lemmon Survey	·	1.7 km	MPC · JPL
390173	2012 VS_{109}	—	September 28, 2006	Kitt Peak	Spacewatch	·	2.9 km	MPC · JPL
390174	2012 WU	—	December 28, 2005	Kitt Peak	Spacewatch	3:2	4.3 km	MPC · JPL
390175	2012 WT_{2}	—	September 30, 2005	Mount Lemmon	Mount Lemmon Survey	·	660 m	MPC · JPL
390176	2012 WH_{3}	—	March 16, 2007	Kitt Peak	Spacewatch	·	1.3 km	MPC · JPL
390177	2012 WO_{5}	—	October 20, 2001	Socorro	LINEAR	·	1.2 km	MPC · JPL
390178	2012 WF_{6}	—	October 21, 2003	Kitt Peak	Spacewatch	·	2.2 km	MPC · JPL
390179	2012 WU_{6}	—	April 20, 2007	Mount Lemmon	Mount Lemmon Survey	CLA	1.9 km	MPC · JPL
390180	2012 WP_{11}	—	September 25, 2006	Mount Lemmon	Mount Lemmon Survey	THM	1.8 km	MPC · JPL
390181	2012 WR_{11}	—	October 10, 2007	Mount Lemmon	Mount Lemmon Survey	·	2.0 km	MPC · JPL
390182	2012 WO_{12}	—	February 25, 2006	Kitt Peak	Spacewatch	·	2.8 km	MPC · JPL
390183	2012 WW_{12}	—	September 13, 2007	Mount Lemmon	Mount Lemmon Survey	·	2.0 km	MPC · JPL
390184	2012 WV_{13}	—	March 8, 2005	Mount Lemmon	Mount Lemmon Survey	·	1.6 km	MPC · JPL
390185	2012 WF_{16}	—	December 21, 2008	Catalina	CSS	·	1.5 km	MPC · JPL
390186	2012 WW_{17}	—	December 22, 2000	Kitt Peak	Spacewatch	·	1.5 km	MPC · JPL
390187	2012 WH_{18}	—	November 17, 2007	Mount Lemmon	Mount Lemmon Survey	·	2.7 km	MPC · JPL
390188	2012 WD_{20}	—	September 9, 2007	Kitt Peak	Spacewatch	·	2.1 km	MPC · JPL
390189	2012 WV_{20}	—	October 3, 2002	Socorro	LINEAR	·	720 m	MPC · JPL
390190	2012 WG_{22}	—	March 19, 2010	Kitt Peak	Spacewatch	·	1.2 km	MPC · JPL
390191	2012 WT_{22}	—	October 21, 2003	Kitt Peak	Spacewatch	·	2.0 km	MPC · JPL
390192	2012 WD_{23}	—	October 3, 2006	Mount Lemmon	Mount Lemmon Survey	VER	3.0 km	MPC · JPL
390193	2012 WM_{23}	—	September 12, 2007	Kitt Peak	Spacewatch	·	1.7 km	MPC · JPL
390194	2012 WX_{23}	—	December 29, 2003	Kitt Peak	Spacewatch	·	2.0 km	MPC · JPL
390195	2012 WG_{26}	—	August 16, 2001	Prescott	P. G. Comba	·	940 m	MPC · JPL
390196	2012 WL_{26}	—	December 7, 2008	Mount Lemmon	Mount Lemmon Survey	·	3.1 km	MPC · JPL
390197	2012 WV_{26}	—	December 31, 2008	Mount Lemmon	Mount Lemmon Survey	·	2.1 km	MPC · JPL
390198	2012 WZ_{26}	—	November 29, 2000	Kitt Peak	Spacewatch	·	1.5 km	MPC · JPL
390199	2012 WX_{29}	—	June 14, 2004	Socorro	LINEAR	·	1.4 km	MPC · JPL
390200	2012 WF_{30}	—	September 6, 2008	Mount Lemmon	Mount Lemmon Survey	MAS	750 m	MPC · JPL

== 390201–390300 ==
back to top

Designation			Discovery			Properties		Ref
Permanent	Provisional	Named after	Date	Site	Discoverer(s)	Category	Diam.	Ref
390201	2012 WZ_{31}	—	September 26, 2006	Kitt Peak	Spacewatch	·	2.6 km	MPC · JPL
390202	2012 XP	—	October 14, 2007	Mount Lemmon	Mount Lemmon Survey	·	2.7 km	MPC · JPL
390203	2012 XQ	—	September 18, 2003	Kitt Peak	Spacewatch	·	1.5 km	MPC · JPL
390204	2012 XE_{2}	—	February 13, 2004	Kitt Peak	Spacewatch	615	1.9 km	MPC · JPL
390205	2012 XW_{4}	—	February 6, 2006	Kitt Peak	Spacewatch	·	1.5 km	MPC · JPL
390206	2012 XD_{6}	—	December 15, 2009	Mount Lemmon	Mount Lemmon Survey	·	1.2 km	MPC · JPL
390207	2012 XS_{7}	—	January 13, 2005	Kitt Peak	Spacewatch	·	1.5 km	MPC · JPL
390208	2012 XV_{8}	—	January 19, 2005	Kitt Peak	Spacewatch	·	1.6 km	MPC · JPL
390209	2012 XM_{11}	—	September 12, 2007	Mount Lemmon	Mount Lemmon Survey	AST	1.4 km	MPC · JPL
390210	2012 XD_{12}	—	October 19, 2003	Kitt Peak	Spacewatch	·	1.5 km	MPC · JPL
390211	2012 XO_{12}	—	May 2, 2006	Mount Lemmon	Mount Lemmon Survey	·	1.5 km	MPC · JPL
390212	2012 XS_{18}	—	November 18, 2007	Kitt Peak	Spacewatch	·	1.8 km	MPC · JPL
390213	2012 XR_{23}	—	November 18, 2007	Mount Lemmon	Mount Lemmon Survey	·	2.7 km	MPC · JPL
390214	2012 XA_{26}	—	October 22, 2006	Kitt Peak	Spacewatch	·	2.5 km	MPC · JPL
390215	2012 XC_{26}	—	September 25, 2005	Kitt Peak	Spacewatch	·	810 m	MPC · JPL
390216	2012 XU_{26}	—	November 6, 2007	Kitt Peak	Spacewatch	KOR	1.5 km	MPC · JPL
390217	2012 XY_{29}	—	September 15, 2007	Mount Lemmon	Mount Lemmon Survey	KOR	1.6 km	MPC · JPL
390218	2012 XD_{33}	—	January 27, 2004	Kitt Peak	Spacewatch	AGN	1.1 km	MPC · JPL
390219	2012 XN_{36}	—	November 19, 2003	Kitt Peak	Spacewatch	·	1.6 km	MPC · JPL
390220	2012 XB_{37}	—	September 30, 2006	Mount Lemmon	Mount Lemmon Survey	·	2.7 km	MPC · JPL
390221	2012 XE_{37}	—	December 16, 2004	Socorro	LINEAR	·	1.3 km	MPC · JPL
390222	2012 XW_{37}	—	March 24, 2006	Mount Lemmon	Mount Lemmon Survey	·	1.2 km	MPC · JPL
390223	2012 XB_{38}	—	October 14, 1998	Kitt Peak	Spacewatch	·	770 m	MPC · JPL
390224	2012 XZ_{38}	—	April 9, 2002	Kitt Peak	Spacewatch	·	940 m	MPC · JPL
390225	2012 XB_{42}	—	April 24, 2006	Kitt Peak	Spacewatch	·	1.7 km	MPC · JPL
390226	2012 XE_{42}	—	August 29, 2006	Kitt Peak	Spacewatch	·	2.1 km	MPC · JPL
390227	2012 XM_{42}	—	September 15, 2007	Mount Lemmon	Mount Lemmon Survey	KOR	1.4 km	MPC · JPL
390228	2012 XR_{42}	—	January 17, 2005	Kitt Peak	Spacewatch	·	1.5 km	MPC · JPL
390229	2012 XN_{43}	—	December 31, 1997	Kitt Peak	Spacewatch	·	1.9 km	MPC · JPL
390230	2012 XM_{45}	—	May 19, 2006	Mount Lemmon	Mount Lemmon Survey	·	2.8 km	MPC · JPL
390231	2012 XP_{49}	—	November 9, 2007	Kitt Peak	Spacewatch	·	1.8 km	MPC · JPL
390232	2012 XS_{51}	—	October 5, 2004	Kitt Peak	Spacewatch	·	1.2 km	MPC · JPL
390233	2012 XT_{51}	—	October 11, 2007	Kitt Peak	Spacewatch	·	2.3 km	MPC · JPL
390234	2012 XQ_{52}	—	November 17, 2006	Mount Lemmon	Mount Lemmon Survey	VER	3.4 km	MPC · JPL
390235	2012 XM_{54}	—	December 31, 2002	Socorro	LINEAR	·	2.6 km	MPC · JPL
390236	2012 XT_{55}	—	May 12, 2010	Mount Lemmon	Mount Lemmon Survey	·	1.6 km	MPC · JPL
390237	2012 XV_{60}	—	October 8, 2008	Kitt Peak	Spacewatch	·	1.2 km	MPC · JPL
390238	2012 XG_{63}	—	October 23, 2006	Mount Lemmon	Mount Lemmon Survey	·	2.7 km	MPC · JPL
390239	2012 XQ_{63}	—	May 9, 2010	Mount Lemmon	Mount Lemmon Survey	·	1.5 km	MPC · JPL
390240	2012 XK_{69}	—	December 4, 2007	Catalina	CSS	·	2.3 km	MPC · JPL
390241	2012 XO_{69}	—	June 12, 2011	Mount Lemmon	Mount Lemmon Survey	·	3.5 km	MPC · JPL
390242	2012 XY_{69}	—	February 28, 2009	Mount Lemmon	Mount Lemmon Survey	·	1.9 km	MPC · JPL
390243	2012 XK_{78}	—	January 7, 2006	Kitt Peak	Spacewatch	·	1.4 km	MPC · JPL
390244	2012 XX_{79}	—	September 11, 2004	Kitt Peak	Spacewatch	·	1.3 km	MPC · JPL
390245	2012 XH_{80}	—	February 17, 2010	Kitt Peak	Spacewatch	V	690 m	MPC · JPL
390246	2012 XE_{82}	—	June 9, 2005	Kitt Peak	Spacewatch	TIR	3.2 km	MPC · JPL
390247	2012 XK_{85}	—	March 29, 2004	Kitt Peak	Spacewatch	·	3.1 km	MPC · JPL
390248	2012 XF_{87}	—	April 20, 2010	Kitt Peak	Spacewatch	NEM	2.8 km	MPC · JPL
390249	2012 XZ_{91}	—	November 17, 2007	Kitt Peak	Spacewatch	KOR	1.3 km	MPC · JPL
390250	2012 XW_{94}	—	February 2, 2008	Mount Lemmon	Mount Lemmon Survey	CYB	3.5 km	MPC · JPL
390251	2012 XD_{96}	—	December 12, 2004	Kitt Peak	Spacewatch	·	1.8 km	MPC · JPL
390252	2012 XL_{96}	—	April 14, 2010	Catalina	CSS	ADE	3.1 km	MPC · JPL
390253	2012 XZ_{97}	—	October 5, 2007	Kitt Peak	Spacewatch	·	2.5 km	MPC · JPL
390254	2012 XJ_{106}	—	November 5, 2007	Mount Lemmon	Mount Lemmon Survey	KOR	1.7 km	MPC · JPL
390255	2012 XU_{114}	—	April 24, 2010	WISE	WISE	·	5.4 km	MPC · JPL
390256	2012 XK_{119}	—	December 10, 2004	Kitt Peak	Spacewatch	·	1.8 km	MPC · JPL
390257	2012 XM_{128}	—	September 19, 2006	Catalina	CSS	·	2.8 km	MPC · JPL
390258	2012 XZ_{129}	—	October 21, 2006	Kitt Peak	Spacewatch	HYG	2.8 km	MPC · JPL
390259	2012 XO_{130}	—	January 30, 2004	Kitt Peak	Spacewatch	KOR	1.4 km	MPC · JPL
390260	2012 XU_{131}	—	December 1, 2008	Kitt Peak	Spacewatch	fast	1.5 km	MPC · JPL
390261	2012 XQ_{133}	—	November 21, 2008	Kitt Peak	Spacewatch	·	1.6 km	MPC · JPL
390262	2012 XU_{133}	—	November 24, 2008	Kitt Peak	Spacewatch	·	1.6 km	MPC · JPL
390263	2012 XM_{135}	—	November 12, 2007	Mount Lemmon	Mount Lemmon Survey	·	2.7 km	MPC · JPL
390264	2012 XO_{135}	—	August 21, 2006	Kitt Peak	Spacewatch	·	2.6 km	MPC · JPL
390265	2012 XV_{136}	—	October 15, 2007	Mount Lemmon	Mount Lemmon Survey	·	2.4 km	MPC · JPL
390266	2012 XD_{138}	—	October 21, 2007	Mount Lemmon	Mount Lemmon Survey	·	2.9 km	MPC · JPL
390267	2012 XS_{138}	—	December 3, 2008	Mount Lemmon	Mount Lemmon Survey	·	2.7 km	MPC · JPL
390268	2012 XL_{141}	—	February 27, 2006	Kitt Peak	Spacewatch	·	1.1 km	MPC · JPL
390269	2012 XS_{143}	—	September 10, 2007	Mount Lemmon	Mount Lemmon Survey	·	1.9 km	MPC · JPL
390270	2012 XF_{145}	—	July 5, 2005	Kitt Peak	Spacewatch	·	4.5 km	MPC · JPL
390271	2012 XX_{145}	—	April 20, 2010	Mount Lemmon	Mount Lemmon Survey	·	2.3 km	MPC · JPL
390272	2012 XN_{148}	—	November 3, 2007	Kitt Peak	Spacewatch	KOR	1.4 km	MPC · JPL
390273	2012 XX_{148}	—	December 12, 2004	Kitt Peak	Spacewatch	·	1.5 km	MPC · JPL
390274	2012 XE_{149}	—	October 15, 2007	Mount Lemmon	Mount Lemmon Survey	·	2.3 km	MPC · JPL
390275	2012 XF_{149}	—	April 5, 2003	Kitt Peak	Spacewatch	·	1.7 km	MPC · JPL
390276	2012 XK_{152}	—	April 25, 2004	Kitt Peak	Spacewatch	·	3.3 km	MPC · JPL
390277	2012 XX_{153}	—	March 17, 2009	Kitt Peak	Spacewatch	·	2.1 km	MPC · JPL
390278	2012 YH_{1}	—	December 14, 2006	Kitt Peak	Spacewatch	·	4.9 km	MPC · JPL
390279	2012 YV_{1}	—	January 1, 2008	Kitt Peak	Spacewatch	TEL	2.0 km	MPC · JPL
390280	2012 YT_{8}	—	June 25, 2007	Kitt Peak	Spacewatch	L4	9.4 km	MPC · JPL
390281	2013 AF_{6}	—	November 15, 1999	Kitt Peak	Spacewatch	·	1.7 km	MPC · JPL
390282	2013 AN_{9}	—	October 21, 2006	Mount Lemmon	Mount Lemmon Survey	·	3.4 km	MPC · JPL
390283	2013 AY_{9}	—	June 27, 2004	Siding Spring	SSS	·	1.2 km	MPC · JPL
390284	2013 AA_{10}	—	December 18, 2001	Socorro	LINEAR	·	2.8 km	MPC · JPL
390285	2013 AL_{13}	—	November 13, 2006	Catalina	CSS	EOS	1.9 km	MPC · JPL
390286	2013 AH_{16}	—	September 1, 2000	Socorro	LINEAR	·	3.7 km	MPC · JPL
390287	2013 AM_{21}	—	November 27, 2006	Kitt Peak	Spacewatch	·	3.9 km	MPC · JPL
390288	2013 AN_{23}	—	October 28, 2010	Mount Lemmon	Mount Lemmon Survey	L4	7.2 km	MPC · JPL
390289	2013 AD_{24}	—	October 18, 2007	Mount Lemmon	Mount Lemmon Survey	·	1.6 km	MPC · JPL
390290	2013 AR_{24}	—	May 6, 2006	Mount Lemmon	Mount Lemmon Survey	·	2.2 km	MPC · JPL
390291	2013 AD_{27}	—	August 22, 2001	Kitt Peak	Spacewatch	·	2.9 km	MPC · JPL
390292	2013 AL_{29}	—	April 9, 2002	Socorro	LINEAR	·	1.3 km	MPC · JPL
390293	2013 AK_{31}	—	January 20, 2009	Mount Lemmon	Mount Lemmon Survey	·	2.2 km	MPC · JPL
390294	2013 AT_{31}	—	November 10, 2006	Kitt Peak	Spacewatch	·	3.3 km	MPC · JPL
390295	2013 AN_{43}	—	June 11, 2005	Kitt Peak	Spacewatch	·	2.7 km	MPC · JPL
390296	2013 AD_{44}	—	October 10, 2010	Mount Lemmon	Mount Lemmon Survey	L4	9.6 km	MPC · JPL
390297	2013 AE_{47}	—	October 2, 2006	Mount Lemmon	Mount Lemmon Survey	·	2.8 km	MPC · JPL
390298	2013 AW_{48}	—	November 13, 2006	Catalina	CSS	·	5.3 km	MPC · JPL
390299	2013 AT_{51}	—	September 20, 2006	Catalina	CSS	·	3.3 km	MPC · JPL
390300	2013 AS_{60}	—	March 26, 2003	Kitt Peak	Spacewatch	L4	7.5 km	MPC · JPL

== 390301–390400 ==
back to top

Designation			Discovery			Properties		Ref
Permanent	Provisional	Named after	Date	Site	Discoverer(s)	Category	Diam.	Ref
390301	2013 AG_{64}	—	October 17, 2010	Mount Lemmon	Mount Lemmon Survey	L4	10 km	MPC · JPL
390302	2013 AF_{68}	—	March 15, 2004	Kitt Peak	Spacewatch	·	2.0 km	MPC · JPL
390303	2013 AO_{76}	—	January 6, 2000	Kitt Peak	Spacewatch	L4	10 km	MPC · JPL
390304	2013 AW_{86}	—	May 16, 1999	Kitt Peak	Spacewatch	EOS	2.4 km	MPC · JPL
390305	2013 AB_{88}	—	April 17, 2009	Kitt Peak	Spacewatch	·	3.3 km	MPC · JPL
390306	2013 AK_{93}	—	October 15, 2007	Mount Lemmon	Mount Lemmon Survey	EMA	3.5 km	MPC · JPL
390307	2013 AX_{94}	—	February 26, 2009	Kitt Peak	Spacewatch	·	2.3 km	MPC · JPL
390308	2013 AL_{99}	—	October 25, 2012	Kitt Peak	Spacewatch	L4	10 km	MPC · JPL
390309	2013 AV_{106}	—	June 21, 2007	Mount Lemmon	Mount Lemmon Survey	L4	10 km	MPC · JPL
390310	2013 AZ_{109}	—	November 7, 2008	Mount Lemmon	Mount Lemmon Survey	·	1.4 km	MPC · JPL
390311	2013 AE_{112}	—	November 14, 2010	Catalina	CSS	L4	10 km	MPC · JPL
390312	2013 AS_{116}	—	October 8, 2005	Catalina	CSS	·	4.8 km	MPC · JPL
390313	2013 AU_{119}	—	November 2, 2000	Kitt Peak	Spacewatch	·	2.6 km	MPC · JPL
390314	2013 AT_{122}	—	May 24, 2006	Mount Lemmon	Mount Lemmon Survey	EUN	1.5 km	MPC · JPL
390315	2013 AB_{127}	—	September 30, 2006	Catalina	CSS	EOS	2.2 km	MPC · JPL
390316	2013 AG_{132}	—	March 5, 2002	Kitt Peak	Spacewatch	L4	9.3 km	MPC · JPL
390317	2013 AB_{133}	—	November 8, 2010	Mount Lemmon	Mount Lemmon Survey	L4	9.6 km	MPC · JPL
390318	2013 AF_{150}	—	February 29, 2008	Mount Lemmon	Mount Lemmon Survey	·	3.6 km	MPC · JPL
390319	2013 AO_{165}	—	August 30, 2005	Kitt Peak	Spacewatch	·	2.6 km	MPC · JPL
390320	2013 AG_{167}	—	April 2, 2009	Kitt Peak	Spacewatch	EOS	2.2 km	MPC · JPL
390321	2013 AL_{170}	—	May 6, 2010	WISE	WISE	·	3.5 km	MPC · JPL
390322	2013 BA_{1}	—	October 17, 2009	Mount Lemmon	Mount Lemmon Survey	L4 · ERY	9.5 km	MPC · JPL
390323	2013 BB_{1}	—	October 18, 1998	Kitt Peak	Spacewatch	L4	8.0 km	MPC · JPL
390324	2013 BL_{14}	—	February 27, 2006	Kitt Peak	Spacewatch	·	1.5 km	MPC · JPL
390325	2013 BQ_{17}	—	April 22, 2004	Kitt Peak	Spacewatch	L4	8.2 km	MPC · JPL
390326	2013 BR_{17}	—	September 19, 2009	Mount Lemmon	Mount Lemmon Survey	L4	7.1 km	MPC · JPL
390327	2013 BB_{53}	—	January 10, 2008	Mount Lemmon	Mount Lemmon Survey	EOS	2.4 km	MPC · JPL
390328	2013 BJ_{60}	—	September 29, 2009	Mount Lemmon	Mount Lemmon Survey	L4	9.9 km	MPC · JPL
390329	2013 BZ_{61}	—	September 15, 2009	Kitt Peak	Spacewatch	L4	7.2 km	MPC · JPL
390330	2013 BG_{62}	—	December 28, 2000	Kitt Peak	Spacewatch	L4	8.9 km	MPC · JPL
390331	2013 BG_{64}	—	September 13, 2007	Mount Lemmon	Mount Lemmon Survey	L4	8.7 km	MPC · JPL
390332	2013 BF_{78}	—	December 19, 2007	Kitt Peak	Spacewatch	·	2.4 km	MPC · JPL
390333	2013 CK_{10}	—	October 12, 2010	Mount Lemmon	Mount Lemmon Survey	L4	7.0 km	MPC · JPL
390334	2013 CF_{14}	—	January 3, 2001	Kitt Peak	Spacewatch	L4	8.2 km	MPC · JPL
390335	2013 CL_{15}	—	February 7, 2008	Kitt Peak	Spacewatch	·	2.3 km	MPC · JPL
390336	2013 CX_{43}	—	September 28, 2009	Mount Lemmon	Mount Lemmon Survey	L4	8.5 km	MPC · JPL
390337	2013 CE_{58}	—	September 4, 2008	Kitt Peak	Spacewatch	L4	10 km	MPC · JPL
390338	2013 CF_{71}	—	February 2, 2001	Kitt Peak	Spacewatch	L4	9.2 km	MPC · JPL
390339	2013 CC_{74}	—	November 14, 2010	Mount Lemmon	Mount Lemmon Survey	L4	8.5 km	MPC · JPL
390340	2013 CD_{77}	—	January 29, 2010	WISE	WISE	L4	9.9 km	MPC · JPL
390341	2013 CQ_{79}	—	March 24, 2009	Mount Lemmon	Mount Lemmon Survey	LIX	4.2 km	MPC · JPL
390342	2013 CT_{79}	—	February 10, 2002	Socorro	LINEAR	·	4.3 km	MPC · JPL
390343	2013 CB_{80}	—	October 11, 2005	Kitt Peak	Spacewatch	THM	2.6 km	MPC · JPL
390344	2013 CP_{95}	—	September 10, 2007	Mount Lemmon	Mount Lemmon Survey	L4 · ERY	7.6 km	MPC · JPL
390345	2013 CA_{105}	—	January 5, 2000	Kitt Peak	Spacewatch	L4	7.1 km	MPC · JPL
390346	2013 CY_{109}	—	September 27, 2009	Mount Lemmon	Mount Lemmon Survey	L4	7.1 km	MPC · JPL
390347	2013 CU_{111}	—	December 4, 2010	Mount Lemmon	Mount Lemmon Survey	L4	8.8 km	MPC · JPL
390348	2013 CS_{133}	—	December 10, 2001	Kitt Peak	Spacewatch	EOS	2.6 km	MPC · JPL
390349	2013 CG_{140}	—	May 13, 2004	Kitt Peak	Spacewatch	L4 · ERY	8.4 km	MPC · JPL
390350	2013 CU_{141}	—	August 24, 2008	Kitt Peak	Spacewatch	L4	7.6 km	MPC · JPL
390351	2013 CC_{143}	—	September 20, 2009	Mount Lemmon	Mount Lemmon Survey	L4	7.3 km	MPC · JPL
390352	2013 CY_{173}	—	September 4, 2008	Kitt Peak	Spacewatch	L4 · (222861)	7.6 km	MPC · JPL
390353	2013 CB_{178}	—	October 18, 2009	Catalina	CSS	L4	10 km	MPC · JPL
390354	2013 CS_{178}	—	October 3, 1997	Caussols	ODAS	L4	10 km	MPC · JPL
390355	2013 CJ_{185}	—	November 18, 2006	Mount Lemmon	Mount Lemmon Survey	·	4.1 km	MPC · JPL
390356	2013 CW_{194}	—	January 10, 1997	Kitt Peak	Spacewatch	·	2.9 km	MPC · JPL
390357	2013 CM_{196}	—	September 15, 2009	Kitt Peak	Spacewatch	L4	7.4 km	MPC · JPL
390358	2013 CC_{207}	—	January 16, 2000	Kitt Peak	Spacewatch	L4 · ERY	8.2 km	MPC · JPL
390359	2013 CO_{209}	—	July 16, 2010	WISE	WISE	CYB	4.6 km	MPC · JPL
390360	2013 CY_{210}	—	September 4, 2008	Kitt Peak	Spacewatch	L4	7.7 km	MPC · JPL
390361	2013 CO_{212}	—	March 23, 2003	Kitt Peak	Spacewatch	L4	9.3 km	MPC · JPL
390362	2013 CQ_{217}	—	September 10, 2007	Mount Lemmon	Mount Lemmon Survey	L4 · ERY	7.8 km	MPC · JPL
390363	2013 DU_{2}	—	October 2, 2008	Mount Lemmon	Mount Lemmon Survey	L4	8.7 km	MPC · JPL
390364	2013 EF_{46}	—	September 12, 2004	Kitt Peak	Spacewatch	·	3.0 km	MPC · JPL
390365	2013 EJ_{94}	—	May 3, 2008	Mount Lemmon	Mount Lemmon Survey	CYB	6.6 km	MPC · JPL
390366	2013 GD_{76}	—	March 10, 2003	Kitt Peak	Spacewatch	·	790 m	MPC · JPL
390367	2013 JP_{55}	—	April 25, 2007	Kitt Peak	Spacewatch	·	4.5 km	MPC · JPL
390368	2013 LZ_{9}	—	March 26, 2009	Mount Lemmon	Mount Lemmon Survey	·	1.2 km	MPC · JPL
390369	2013 LQ_{35}	—	February 29, 2008	Catalina	CSS	HNS	1.6 km	MPC · JPL
390370	2013 QP_{26}	—	October 16, 2006	Catalina	CSS	·	1.2 km	MPC · JPL
390371	2013 RE_{13}	—	October 22, 2009	Mount Lemmon	Mount Lemmon Survey	EUN	1.6 km	MPC · JPL
390372	2013 SU_{47}	—	April 25, 2007	Mount Lemmon	Mount Lemmon Survey	·	2.2 km	MPC · JPL
390373	2013 TU_{11}	—	November 11, 2006	Kitt Peak	Spacewatch	·	2.1 km	MPC · JPL
390374	2013 TR_{32}	—	April 21, 2006	Catalina	CSS	·	3.2 km	MPC · JPL
390375	2013 TH_{46}	—	July 30, 2008	Kitt Peak	Spacewatch	·	1.9 km	MPC · JPL
390376	2013 TA_{47}	—	February 25, 2007	Mount Lemmon	Mount Lemmon Survey	(5)	1.7 km	MPC · JPL
390377	2013 TR_{72}	—	October 7, 2004	Kitt Peak	Spacewatch	MRX	1.6 km	MPC · JPL
390378	2013 TB_{90}	—	March 13, 2011	Mount Lemmon	Mount Lemmon Survey	·	3.3 km	MPC · JPL
390379	2013 UK_{14}	—	November 6, 2005	Mount Lemmon	Mount Lemmon Survey	(5)	1.3 km	MPC · JPL
390380	2013 VZ_{18}	—	December 1, 2008	Socorro	LINEAR	·	2.4 km	MPC · JPL
390381	2013 VW_{20}	—	December 30, 2000	Socorro	LINEAR	·	1.7 km	MPC · JPL
390382	2013 WM_{14}	—	September 24, 1960	Palomar	C. J. van Houten, I. van Houten-Groeneveld, T. Gehrels	·	1.3 km	MPC · JPL
390383	2013 WF_{29}	—	September 26, 1995	Kitt Peak	Spacewatch	·	3.4 km	MPC · JPL
390384	2013 WB_{46}	—	December 10, 2004	Socorro	LINEAR	GEF	1.9 km	MPC · JPL
390385	2013 WG_{47}	—	February 8, 2006	Kitt Peak	Spacewatch	·	1.7 km	MPC · JPL
390386	2013 WC_{58}	—	August 27, 2009	Kitt Peak	Spacewatch	HNS	1.9 km	MPC · JPL
390387	2013 WJ_{63}	—	June 6, 2002	Socorro	LINEAR	·	2.4 km	MPC · JPL
390388	2013 WB_{69}	—	December 2, 2008	Kitt Peak	Spacewatch	(159)	3.0 km	MPC · JPL
390389	2013 WY_{81}	—	January 2, 2003	Socorro	LINEAR	EUP	5.8 km	MPC · JPL
390390	2013 WC_{84}	—	October 8, 2007	Catalina	CSS	·	5.6 km	MPC · JPL
390391	2013 WN_{85}	—	September 7, 1996	Kitt Peak	Spacewatch	·	2.8 km	MPC · JPL
390392	2013 WG_{86}	—	December 5, 2002	Socorro	LINEAR	·	4.1 km	MPC · JPL
390393	2013 WQ_{94}	—	September 30, 2008	Catalina	CSS	·	2.8 km	MPC · JPL
390394	2013 WC_{98}	—	September 12, 2004	Kitt Peak	Spacewatch	·	1.8 km	MPC · JPL
390395	2013 XE	—	September 12, 2004	Socorro	LINEAR	HNS	1.7 km	MPC · JPL
390396	2013 XA_{2}	—	September 24, 2008	Mount Lemmon	Mount Lemmon Survey	KON	3.2 km	MPC · JPL
390397	2013 XE_{2}	—	October 7, 2008	Mount Lemmon	Mount Lemmon Survey	EUN	1.4 km	MPC · JPL
390398	2013 XV_{20}	—	September 15, 2007	Catalina	CSS	T_{j} (2.98) · EUP	4.3 km	MPC · JPL
390399	2013 XA_{23}	—	December 2, 2008	Kitt Peak	Spacewatch	·	3.4 km	MPC · JPL
390400	2013 YO_{5}	—	February 10, 2002	Socorro	LINEAR	·	1.1 km	MPC · JPL

== 390401–390500 ==
back to top

Designation			Discovery			Properties		Ref
Permanent	Provisional	Named after	Date	Site	Discoverer(s)	Category	Diam.	Ref
390401	2013 YU_{5}	—	January 25, 2006	Catalina	CSS	·	2.6 km	MPC · JPL
390402	2013 YJ_{9}	—	December 3, 2008	Mount Lemmon	Mount Lemmon Survey	EOS	2.2 km	MPC · JPL
390403	2013 YU_{10}	—	November 13, 2007	Mount Lemmon	Mount Lemmon Survey	·	2.6 km	MPC · JPL
390404	2013 YE_{11}	—	September 14, 2006	Kitt Peak	Spacewatch	·	720 m	MPC · JPL
390405	2013 YB_{13}	—	December 10, 2004	Kitt Peak	Spacewatch	·	3.0 km	MPC · JPL
390406	2013 YN_{13}	—	January 23, 2006	Kitt Peak	Spacewatch	·	1.2 km	MPC · JPL
390407	2013 YX_{13}	—	July 27, 2005	Siding Spring	SSS	H	650 m	MPC · JPL
390408	2013 YJ_{16}	—	December 7, 2008	Mount Lemmon	Mount Lemmon Survey	GEF	1.1 km	MPC · JPL
390409	2013 YU_{16}	—	November 8, 2008	Mount Lemmon	Mount Lemmon Survey	·	1.8 km	MPC · JPL
390410	2013 YQ_{17}	—	October 10, 2007	Catalina	CSS	EOS	2.1 km	MPC · JPL
390411	2013 YU_{19}	—	August 23, 2007	Siding Spring	SSS	·	4.1 km	MPC · JPL
390412	2013 YK_{27}	—	December 30, 2007	Mount Lemmon	Mount Lemmon Survey	LUT	6.6 km	MPC · JPL
390413	2013 YK_{29}	—	February 1, 2006	Catalina	CSS	·	3.1 km	MPC · JPL
390414	2013 YA_{30}	—	September 20, 2006	Kitt Peak	Spacewatch	·	3.8 km	MPC · JPL
390415	2013 YO_{30}	—	March 16, 2009	Catalina	CSS	·	4.1 km	MPC · JPL
390416	2013 YA_{32}	—	May 7, 2007	Mount Lemmon	Mount Lemmon Survey	MAR	1.3 km	MPC · JPL
390417	2013 YF_{32}	—	June 28, 2011	Mount Lemmon	Mount Lemmon Survey	·	2.1 km	MPC · JPL
390418	2013 YH_{32}	—	April 7, 2003	Kitt Peak	Spacewatch	·	1.4 km	MPC · JPL
390419	2013 YL_{32}	—	February 14, 2005	Catalina	CSS	·	4.4 km	MPC · JPL
390420	2013 YN_{32}	—	November 5, 2007	XuYi	PMO NEO Survey Program	·	2.9 km	MPC · JPL
390421	2013 YQ_{32}	—	September 28, 2006	Catalina	CSS	·	4.0 km	MPC · JPL
390422	2013 YB_{34}	—	February 1, 2006	Mount Lemmon	Mount Lemmon Survey	(5)	1.1 km	MPC · JPL
390423	2013 YM_{34}	—	January 30, 2006	Catalina	CSS	·	2.9 km	MPC · JPL
390424	2013 YW_{35}	—	November 21, 2006	Catalina	CSS	·	850 m	MPC · JPL
390425	2013 YH_{40}	—	June 15, 2007	Kitt Peak	Spacewatch	·	2.2 km	MPC · JPL
390426	2013 YO_{43}	—	March 30, 2004	Kitt Peak	Spacewatch	·	3.9 km	MPC · JPL
390427	2013 YO_{45}	—	March 3, 2006	Catalina	CSS	BAR	1.5 km	MPC · JPL
390428	2013 YF_{49}	—	October 28, 2008	Mount Lemmon	Mount Lemmon Survey	·	2.7 km	MPC · JPL
390429	2013 YL_{49}	—	September 30, 2005	Kitt Peak	Spacewatch	·	910 m	MPC · JPL
390430	2013 YZ_{49}	—	December 6, 2008	Kitt Peak	Spacewatch	·	3.0 km	MPC · JPL
390431	2013 YC_{50}	—	December 1, 2008	Kitt Peak	Spacewatch	·	3.0 km	MPC · JPL
390432	2013 YF_{50}	—	December 19, 2003	Kitt Peak	Spacewatch	·	830 m	MPC · JPL
390433	2013 YJ_{55}	—	June 12, 2011	Mount Lemmon	Mount Lemmon Survey	·	2.0 km	MPC · JPL
390434	2013 YB_{56}	—	January 20, 2009	Catalina	CSS	·	4.2 km	MPC · JPL
390435	2013 YW_{58}	—	April 21, 2004	Campo Imperatore	CINEOS	·	880 m	MPC · JPL
390436	2013 YY_{58}	—	December 4, 2000	Socorro	LINEAR	·	1.4 km	MPC · JPL
390437	2013 YV_{62}	—	September 4, 2008	Kitt Peak	Spacewatch	·	1.6 km	MPC · JPL
390438	2013 YV_{64}	—	December 18, 2000	Kitt Peak	Spacewatch	·	2.0 km	MPC · JPL
390439	2013 YT_{65}	—	March 6, 2010	WISE	WISE	·	4.9 km	MPC · JPL
390440	2013 YF_{68}	—	December 4, 2007	Socorro	LINEAR	HYG	2.8 km	MPC · JPL
390441	2013 YW_{68}	—	January 27, 2000	Kitt Peak	Spacewatch	·	2.1 km	MPC · JPL
390442	2013 YY_{68}	—	September 9, 2007	Kitt Peak	Spacewatch	·	2.2 km	MPC · JPL
390443	2013 YN_{69}	—	September 21, 2008	Mount Lemmon	Mount Lemmon Survey	EUN	1.4 km	MPC · JPL
390444	2013 YQ_{69}	—	January 20, 2010	WISE	WISE	·	2.9 km	MPC · JPL
390445	2013 YU_{69}	—	March 3, 2000	Socorro	LINEAR	·	880 m	MPC · JPL
390446	2013 YR_{73}	—	November 16, 2000	Kitt Peak	Spacewatch	·	1.5 km	MPC · JPL
390447	2013 YY_{73}	—	December 19, 2004	Mount Lemmon	Mount Lemmon Survey	·	2.6 km	MPC · JPL
390448	2013 YG_{76}	—	January 30, 2003	Socorro	LINEAR	·	3.3 km	MPC · JPL
390449	2013 YC_{78}	—	May 7, 2008	Mount Lemmon	Mount Lemmon Survey	·	980 m	MPC · JPL
390450	2013 YO_{82}	—	March 15, 2004	Kitt Peak	Spacewatch	EOS	1.5 km	MPC · JPL
390451	2013 YS_{83}	—	March 27, 2004	Socorro	LINEAR	·	740 m	MPC · JPL
390452	2013 YH_{90}	—	November 23, 2006	Kitt Peak	Spacewatch	·	770 m	MPC · JPL
390453	2013 YP_{90}	—	September 21, 2008	Mount Lemmon	Mount Lemmon Survey	·	2.2 km	MPC · JPL
390454	2013 YC_{91}	—	January 28, 2006	Mount Lemmon	Mount Lemmon Survey	(5)	940 m	MPC · JPL
390455	2013 YO_{92}	—	October 13, 2004	Anderson Mesa	LONEOS	MAR	1.6 km	MPC · JPL
390456	2013 YF_{96}	—	December 29, 2008	Kitt Peak	Spacewatch	·	2.1 km	MPC · JPL
390457	2013 YD_{97}	—	September 23, 2004	Kitt Peak	Spacewatch	·	1.4 km	MPC · JPL
390458	2013 YX_{97}	—	March 16, 2005	Mount Lemmon	Mount Lemmon Survey	·	1.6 km	MPC · JPL
390459	2013 YD_{98}	—	November 18, 2008	Kitt Peak	Spacewatch	·	2.8 km	MPC · JPL
390460	2013 YJ_{98}	—	October 4, 2004	Kitt Peak	Spacewatch	·	1.1 km	MPC · JPL
390461	2013 YS_{108}	—	March 29, 2008	Kitt Peak	Spacewatch	·	760 m	MPC · JPL
390462	2013 YE_{111}	—	November 17, 2009	Kitt Peak	Spacewatch	NYS	1.2 km	MPC · JPL
390463	2013 YU_{112}	—	February 19, 2010	Kitt Peak	Spacewatch	GEF	1.1 km	MPC · JPL
390464	2013 YT_{113}	—	September 21, 2003	Kitt Peak	Spacewatch	·	1.9 km	MPC · JPL
390465	2013 YG_{114}	—	January 27, 2007	Mount Lemmon	Mount Lemmon Survey	·	820 m	MPC · JPL
390466	2013 YX_{116}	—	December 29, 2008	Mount Lemmon	Mount Lemmon Survey	·	2.9 km	MPC · JPL
390467	2013 YA_{117}	—	February 2, 2005	Kitt Peak	Spacewatch	WIT	1.0 km	MPC · JPL
390468	2013 YS_{118}	—	October 1, 2005	Mount Lemmon	Mount Lemmon Survey	·	3.8 km	MPC · JPL
390469	2013 YF_{120}	—	November 23, 1998	Kitt Peak	Spacewatch	·	1.9 km	MPC · JPL
390470	2013 YE_{124}	—	January 25, 2009	Catalina	CSS	·	3.9 km	MPC · JPL
390471	2013 YJ_{124}	—	November 30, 2003	Kitt Peak	Spacewatch	·	2.5 km	MPC · JPL
390472	2013 YB_{125}	—	January 4, 2003	Socorro	LINEAR	·	1.1 km	MPC · JPL
390473	2013 YM_{125}	—	January 16, 2009	Kitt Peak	Spacewatch	EOS	1.7 km	MPC · JPL
390474	2013 YY_{125}	—	September 26, 2008	Kitt Peak	Spacewatch	·	1.2 km	MPC · JPL
390475	2013 YJ_{129}	—	December 30, 2007	Mount Lemmon	Mount Lemmon Survey	CYB	4.6 km	MPC · JPL
390476	2013 YJ_{132}	—	April 15, 2010	Mount Lemmon	Mount Lemmon Survey	NAE	2.9 km	MPC · JPL
390477	2013 YL_{137}	—	January 7, 2010	Kitt Peak	Spacewatch	·	1.6 km	MPC · JPL
390478	2013 YP_{147}	—	January 31, 2006	Kitt Peak	Spacewatch	·	1.5 km	MPC · JPL
390479	2013 YH_{148}	—	January 17, 1997	Kitt Peak	Spacewatch	·	2.0 km	MPC · JPL
390480	2013 YW_{149}	—	December 3, 2004	Catalina	CSS	EUN	2.4 km	MPC · JPL
390481	2014 AU	—	November 3, 2004	Anderson Mesa	LONEOS	·	2.2 km	MPC · JPL
390482	2014 AK_{4}	—	July 19, 2004	Siding Spring	SSS	·	1.9 km	MPC · JPL
390483	2014 AV_{4}	—	February 20, 2009	Kitt Peak	Spacewatch	·	2.5 km	MPC · JPL
390484	2014 AB_{6}	—	September 18, 2009	Mount Lemmon	Mount Lemmon Survey	·	780 m	MPC · JPL
390485	2014 AG_{9}	—	October 6, 2008	Mount Lemmon	Mount Lemmon Survey	·	1.3 km	MPC · JPL
390486	2014 AT_{19}	—	May 14, 2008	Mount Lemmon	Mount Lemmon Survey	PHO	1.1 km	MPC · JPL
390487	2014 AV_{19}	—	May 14, 2004	Kitt Peak	Spacewatch	·	2.8 km	MPC · JPL
390488	2014 AE_{27}	—	September 23, 2009	Kitt Peak	Spacewatch	·	800 m	MPC · JPL
390489	2014 AC_{28}	—	November 8, 2007	Mount Lemmon	Mount Lemmon Survey	·	4.5 km	MPC · JPL
390490	2014 AN_{29}	—	January 13, 2005	Kitt Peak	Spacewatch	WIT	1.3 km	MPC · JPL
390491	2014 AT_{33}	—	October 14, 2004	Kitt Peak	Spacewatch	·	1.2 km	MPC · JPL
390492	2014 AR_{34}	—	September 11, 2004	Socorro	LINEAR	EUN	1.2 km	MPC · JPL
390493	2014 AG_{39}	—	September 1, 1994	Kitt Peak	Spacewatch	·	2.3 km	MPC · JPL
390494	2014 AG_{40}	—	February 1, 2006	Catalina	CSS	EUN	1.5 km	MPC · JPL
390495	2014 AA_{41}	—	January 25, 1998	Kitt Peak	Spacewatch	·	3.4 km	MPC · JPL
390496	2014 AV_{43}	—	February 3, 2006	Mount Lemmon	Mount Lemmon Survey	·	3.4 km	MPC · JPL
390497	2014 AZ_{44}	—	March 9, 2005	Mount Lemmon	Mount Lemmon Survey	KOR	1.5 km	MPC · JPL
390498	2014 AJ_{47}	—	January 6, 2000	Kitt Peak	Spacewatch	HOF	3.1 km	MPC · JPL
390499	2014 AQ_{49}	—	February 25, 2006	Mount Lemmon	Mount Lemmon Survey	·	750 m	MPC · JPL
390500	2014 AV_{49}	—	March 16, 2004	Socorro	LINEAR	·	1.0 km	MPC · JPL

== 390501–390600 ==
back to top

Designation			Discovery			Properties		Ref
Permanent	Provisional	Named after	Date	Site	Discoverer(s)	Category	Diam.	Ref
390501	2014 AY_{50}	—	February 19, 2009	Kitt Peak	Spacewatch	·	2.8 km	MPC · JPL
390502	2014 AQ_{54}	—	January 3, 2009	Mount Lemmon	Mount Lemmon Survey	·	2.4 km	MPC · JPL
390503	2014 BV	—	January 26, 2006	Mount Lemmon	Mount Lemmon Survey	·	1.5 km	MPC · JPL
390504	2014 BB_{1}	—	February 1, 2009	Catalina	CSS	·	3.4 km	MPC · JPL
390505	2014 BF_{17}	—	August 22, 2006	Cerro Tololo	Deep Ecliptic Survey	·	1.6 km	MPC · JPL
390506	2014 BS_{21}	—	April 20, 1998	Kitt Peak	Spacewatch	·	2.5 km	MPC · JPL
390507	2014 BU_{24}	—	September 19, 2001	Socorro	LINEAR	·	2.2 km	MPC · JPL
390508	2014 BD_{25}	—	June 9, 2004	Socorro	LINEAR	H	650 m	MPC · JPL
390509	2014 BU_{29}	—	April 25, 2003	Anderson Mesa	LONEOS	·	2.7 km	MPC · JPL
390510	2014 BM_{33}	—	April 2, 2006	Kitt Peak	Spacewatch	·	2.2 km	MPC · JPL
390511	2014 BC_{44}	—	September 12, 2004	Socorro	LINEAR	·	1.2 km	MPC · JPL
390512	2014 BC_{56}	—	October 1, 2003	Anderson Mesa	LONEOS	·	2.9 km	MPC · JPL
390513	2014 BJ_{62}	—	April 8, 2006	Kitt Peak	Spacewatch	EUN	1.3 km	MPC · JPL
390514	4209 T-3	—	October 16, 1977	Palomar	C. J. van Houten, I. van Houten-Groeneveld, T. Gehrels	·	1.4 km	MPC · JPL
390515	1994 TQ_{5}	—	October 4, 1994	Kitt Peak	Spacewatch	·	2.2 km	MPC · JPL
390516	1995 SP_{6}	—	September 17, 1995	Kitt Peak	Spacewatch	MAR	1.0 km	MPC · JPL
390517	1995 SZ_{6}	—	September 17, 1995	Kitt Peak	Spacewatch	·	1.5 km	MPC · JPL
390518	1995 SF_{42}	—	September 25, 1995	Kitt Peak	Spacewatch	·	600 m	MPC · JPL
390519	1995 TT_{11}	—	October 15, 1995	Kitt Peak	Spacewatch	·	1.2 km	MPC · JPL
390520	1995 UH_{21}	—	October 19, 1995	Kitt Peak	Spacewatch	·	910 m	MPC · JPL
390521	1995 YU_{3}	—	December 26, 1995	Kitt Peak	Spacewatch	·	480 m	MPC · JPL
390522	1996 GD_{1}	—	April 15, 1996	Kitt Peak	Spacewatch	APO	330 m	MPC · JPL
390523	1996 TE_{22}	—	October 6, 1996	Kitt Peak	Spacewatch	·	2.3 km	MPC · JPL
390524	1996 TW_{27}	—	October 7, 1996	Kitt Peak	Spacewatch	·	1.4 km	MPC · JPL
390525	1996 VB_{26}	—	November 10, 1996	Kitt Peak	Spacewatch	·	980 m	MPC · JPL
390526	1996 XW_{25}	—	December 12, 1996	Oohira	T. Urata	PHO	2.5 km	MPC · JPL
390527	1997 EV_{5}	—	March 4, 1997	Kitt Peak	Spacewatch	·	1.5 km	MPC · JPL
390528	1997 SV_{11}	—	September 27, 1997	Kitt Peak	Spacewatch	L4	7.4 km	MPC · JPL
390529	1997 ST_{12}	—	September 28, 1997	Kitt Peak	Spacewatch	MAS	610 m	MPC · JPL
390530	1998 EG_{8}	—	March 2, 1998	Xinglong	SCAP	·	2.1 km	MPC · JPL
390531	1998 HN_{24}	—	April 24, 1998	Mauna Kea	Veillet, C.	·	2.5 km	MPC · JPL
390532	1998 QO_{102}	—	August 26, 1998	La Silla	E. W. Elst	·	2.7 km	MPC · JPL
390533	1998 RG_{2}	—	September 15, 1998	Caussols	ODAS	·	1.8 km	MPC · JPL
390534	1998 TA_{2}	—	October 13, 1998	San Marcello	L. Tesi	·	1.1 km	MPC · JPL
390535	1999 CW_{89}	—	February 10, 1999	Socorro	LINEAR	·	990 m	MPC · JPL
390536	1999 KK_{1}	—	May 17, 1999	Socorro	LINEAR	AMO	740 m	MPC · JPL
390537	1999 RO_{108}	—	September 8, 1999	Socorro	LINEAR	·	2.1 km	MPC · JPL
390538	1999 RJ_{214}	—	September 10, 1999	Socorro	LINEAR	·	1.8 km	MPC · JPL
390539	1999 TV_{53}	—	October 6, 1999	Kitt Peak	Spacewatch	·	750 m	MPC · JPL
390540	1999 TE_{165}	—	October 10, 1999	Socorro	LINEAR	·	1.1 km	MPC · JPL
390541	1999 TV_{215}	—	October 15, 1999	Socorro	LINEAR	·	1.6 km	MPC · JPL
390542	1999 VV_{91}	—	November 9, 1999	Socorro	LINEAR	JUN	1.5 km	MPC · JPL
390543	1999 YU_{2}	—	December 16, 1999	Kitt Peak	Spacewatch	·	860 m	MPC · JPL
390544	2000 CM_{103}	—	February 8, 2000	Socorro	LINEAR	·	1.8 km	MPC · JPL
390545	2000 CE_{123}	—	February 3, 2000	Socorro	LINEAR	·	2.2 km	MPC · JPL
390546	2000 EK_{50}	—	March 10, 2000	Catalina	CSS	·	830 m	MPC · JPL
390547	2000 ET_{98}	—	March 10, 2000	Kitt Peak	Spacewatch	·	580 m	MPC · JPL
390548	2000 FZ_{5}	—	March 25, 2000	Kitt Peak	Spacewatch	·	1.2 km	MPC · JPL
390549	2000 FH_{6}	—	March 25, 2000	Kitt Peak	Spacewatch	·	800 m	MPC · JPL
390550	2000 JG_{11}	—	May 3, 2000	Socorro	LINEAR	·	730 m	MPC · JPL
390551	2000 JV_{68}	—	May 9, 2000	Kitt Peak	Spacewatch	·	700 m	MPC · JPL
390552	2000 SD_{18}	—	September 23, 2000	Socorro	LINEAR	·	1.4 km	MPC · JPL
390553	2000 SL_{164}	—	September 25, 2000	Socorro	LINEAR	·	1.2 km	MPC · JPL
390554	2000 SM_{204}	—	September 24, 2000	Socorro	LINEAR	·	1.2 km	MPC · JPL
390555	2000 SF_{303}	—	September 28, 2000	Socorro	LINEAR	·	1.5 km	MPC · JPL
390556	2000 TE_{65}	—	October 1, 2000	Socorro	LINEAR	VER	2.6 km	MPC · JPL
390557	2000 UL_{2}	—	October 24, 2000	Emerald Lane	L. Ball	MAS	880 m	MPC · JPL
390558	2000 VV	—	November 1, 2000	Kitt Peak	Spacewatch	·	2.9 km	MPC · JPL
390559	2000 WV_{109}	—	November 20, 2000	Socorro	LINEAR	·	1.4 km	MPC · JPL
390560	2000 YE_{95}	—	December 30, 2000	Socorro	LINEAR	·	1.9 km	MPC · JPL
390561	2001 AR_{25}	—	January 5, 2001	Socorro	LINEAR	H	670 m	MPC · JPL
390562	2001 BG_{13}	—	January 21, 2001	Socorro	LINEAR	·	1.9 km	MPC · JPL
390563	2001 CU_{40}	—	February 15, 2001	Socorro	LINEAR	·	2.0 km	MPC · JPL
390564	2001 CP_{49}	—	February 1, 2001	Kitt Peak	Spacewatch	·	630 m	MPC · JPL
390565	2001 DK_{47}	—	January 26, 2001	Kitt Peak	Spacewatch	·	1.9 km	MPC · JPL
390566	2001 DZ_{62}	—	February 19, 2001	Socorro	LINEAR	·	1.4 km	MPC · JPL
390567	2001 FP_{6}	—	March 20, 2001	Haleakala	NEAT	H	710 m	MPC · JPL
390568	2001 FX_{93}	—	March 16, 2001	Socorro	LINEAR	·	1.9 km	MPC · JPL
390569	2001 FS_{95}	—	March 16, 2001	Socorro	LINEAR	·	1.7 km	MPC · JPL
390570	2001 FU_{166}	—	March 19, 2001	Anderson Mesa	LONEOS	H	560 m	MPC · JPL
390571	2001 HA_{11}	—	April 17, 2001	Socorro	LINEAR	·	660 m	MPC · JPL
390572	2001 HJ_{21}	—	April 23, 2001	Socorro	LINEAR	·	730 m	MPC · JPL
390573	2001 HB_{57}	—	April 25, 2001	Anderson Mesa	LONEOS	H	690 m	MPC · JPL
390574	2001 KQ	—	May 17, 2001	Socorro	LINEAR	·	1.9 km	MPC · JPL
390575	2001 MT_{22}	—	June 25, 2001	Palomar	NEAT	·	840 m	MPC · JPL
390576	2001 OJ_{62}	—	July 23, 2001	Haleakala	NEAT	·	740 m	MPC · JPL
390577	2001 OU_{82}	—	July 27, 2001	Palomar	NEAT	·	2.2 km	MPC · JPL
390578	2001 PF_{16}	—	August 9, 2001	Palomar	NEAT	·	690 m	MPC · JPL
390579	2001 PQ_{62}	—	August 13, 2001	Haleakala	NEAT	·	990 m	MPC · JPL
390580	2001 QP_{6}	—	August 16, 2001	Socorro	LINEAR	·	1.0 km	MPC · JPL
390581	2001 QD_{116}	—	August 17, 2001	Socorro	LINEAR	V	950 m	MPC · JPL
390582	2001 QG_{206}	—	August 23, 2001	Anderson Mesa	LONEOS	GEF	1.5 km	MPC · JPL
390583	2001 QH_{256}	—	August 25, 2001	Socorro	LINEAR	·	2.2 km	MPC · JPL
390584	2001 QX_{288}	—	August 16, 2001	Palomar	NEAT	·	840 m	MPC · JPL
390585	2001 QV_{333}	—	August 16, 2001	Socorro	LINEAR	H	550 m	MPC · JPL
390586	2001 RE_{25}	—	September 7, 2001	Socorro	LINEAR	·	1.0 km	MPC · JPL
390587	2001 RY_{53}	—	September 12, 2001	Socorro	LINEAR	V	680 m	MPC · JPL
390588	2001 RF_{66}	—	September 10, 2001	Socorro	LINEAR	·	2.6 km	MPC · JPL
390589	2001 RM_{134}	—	September 12, 2001	Socorro	LINEAR	·	2.3 km	MPC · JPL
390590	2001 SC_{1}	—	September 17, 2001	Desert Eagle	W. K. Y. Yeung	·	880 m	MPC · JPL
390591	2001 SN_{35}	—	September 16, 2001	Socorro	LINEAR	·	1.1 km	MPC · JPL
390592	2001 SQ_{59}	—	September 17, 2001	Socorro	LINEAR	H	690 m	MPC · JPL
390593	2001 SL_{91}	—	July 25, 2001	Kitt Peak	Spacewatch	·	930 m	MPC · JPL
390594	2001 SV_{96}	—	September 20, 2001	Socorro	LINEAR	·	2.2 km	MPC · JPL
390595	2001 SL_{100}	—	September 20, 2001	Socorro	LINEAR	·	960 m	MPC · JPL
390596	2001 SB_{186}	—	September 19, 2001	Socorro	LINEAR	·	730 m	MPC · JPL
390597	2001 SV_{274}	—	September 20, 2001	Kitt Peak	Spacewatch	·	960 m	MPC · JPL
390598	2001 SJ_{304}	—	September 20, 2001	Socorro	LINEAR	V	830 m	MPC · JPL
390599	2001 SE_{311}	—	September 19, 2001	Socorro	LINEAR	·	1.3 km	MPC · JPL
390600	2001 SC_{313}	—	September 21, 2001	Socorro	LINEAR	DOR	3.3 km	MPC · JPL

== 390601–390700 ==
back to top

Designation			Discovery			Properties		Ref
Permanent	Provisional	Named after	Date	Site	Discoverer(s)	Category	Diam.	Ref
390601	2001 TD_{25}	—	October 14, 2001	Socorro	LINEAR	V	750 m	MPC · JPL
390602	2001 TB_{89}	—	October 14, 2001	Socorro	LINEAR	·	1.1 km	MPC · JPL
390603	2001 TE_{89}	—	October 14, 2001	Socorro	LINEAR	·	1.3 km	MPC · JPL
390604	2001 TT_{152}	—	October 10, 2001	Palomar	NEAT	·	1.1 km	MPC · JPL
390605	2001 TL_{174}	—	October 14, 2001	Socorro	LINEAR	·	3.4 km	MPC · JPL
390606	2001 TC_{175}	—	October 15, 2001	Socorro	LINEAR	·	1.1 km	MPC · JPL
390607	2001 TN_{191}	—	October 14, 2001	Socorro	LINEAR	·	2.9 km	MPC · JPL
390608	2001 TL_{258}	—	October 10, 2001	Palomar	NEAT	·	880 m	MPC · JPL
390609	2001 UD_{28}	—	October 16, 2001	Socorro	LINEAR	PHO	1.0 km	MPC · JPL
390610	2001 UL_{37}	—	October 17, 2001	Socorro	LINEAR	·	3.0 km	MPC · JPL
390611	2001 UV_{58}	—	September 24, 2001	Socorro	LINEAR	·	1.6 km	MPC · JPL
390612	2001 UN_{186}	—	October 17, 2001	Socorro	LINEAR	V	610 m	MPC · JPL
390613	2001 UT_{212}	—	October 10, 2001	Kitt Peak	Spacewatch	·	4.7 km	MPC · JPL
390614	2001 UQ_{213}	—	October 23, 2001	Socorro	LINEAR	·	800 m	MPC · JPL
390615	2001 VN_{3}	—	November 11, 2001	Kitt Peak	Spacewatch	NYS	900 m	MPC · JPL
390616	2001 VM_{7}	—	November 9, 2001	Socorro	LINEAR	INA	3.3 km	MPC · JPL
390617	2001 VO_{75}	—	November 15, 2001	Kitt Peak	Spacewatch	EOS	2.1 km	MPC · JPL
390618	2001 WU_{2}	—	October 21, 2001	Socorro	LINEAR	TIR	3.1 km	MPC · JPL
390619	2001 WV_{46}	—	November 19, 2001	Socorro	LINEAR	·	1.7 km	MPC · JPL
390620	2001 WH_{64}	—	November 12, 2001	Kitt Peak	Spacewatch	·	1.2 km	MPC · JPL
390621	2001 WP_{99}	—	November 19, 2001	Socorro	LINEAR	NYS	1.2 km	MPC · JPL
390622	2001 YR_{131}	—	December 18, 2001	Socorro	LINEAR	TIR	2.9 km	MPC · JPL
390623	2002 AP_{11}	—	January 4, 2002	Kitt Peak	Spacewatch	·	3.3 km	MPC · JPL
390624	2002 AG_{183}	—	January 5, 2002	Palomar	NEAT	T_{j} (2.97)	4.6 km	MPC · JPL
390625	2002 BO_{4}	—	January 19, 2002	Anderson Mesa	LONEOS	T_{j} (2.98)	3.5 km	MPC · JPL
390626	2002 BC_{15}	—	January 19, 2002	Socorro	LINEAR	T_{j} (2.95)	4.0 km	MPC · JPL
390627	2002 CD_{32}	—	February 6, 2002	Socorro	LINEAR	·	1.5 km	MPC · JPL
390628	2002 CU_{89}	—	February 7, 2002	Socorro	LINEAR	·	3.5 km	MPC · JPL
390629	2002 CP_{181}	—	February 10, 2002	Socorro	LINEAR	·	3.4 km	MPC · JPL
390630	2002 CC_{227}	—	February 6, 2002	Palomar	NEAT	THB	3.2 km	MPC · JPL
390631	2002 CL_{285}	—	February 10, 2002	Socorro	LINEAR	·	2.7 km	MPC · JPL
390632	2002 DY_{9}	—	February 19, 2002	Socorro	LINEAR	·	5.1 km	MPC · JPL
390633	2002 FV_{25}	—	March 19, 2002	Palomar	NEAT	PHO	1.4 km	MPC · JPL
390634	2002 GX_{143}	—	April 13, 2002	Palomar	NEAT	·	1.1 km	MPC · JPL
390635	2002 GL_{149}	—	April 14, 2002	Socorro	LINEAR	·	2.0 km	MPC · JPL
390636	2002 JV_{8}	—	May 4, 2002	Socorro	LINEAR	·	1.9 km	MPC · JPL
390637	2002 JO_{108}	—	May 14, 2002	Palomar	NEAT	·	2.4 km	MPC · JPL
390638	2002 LZ_{62}	—	June 13, 2002	Palomar	NEAT	·	950 m	MPC · JPL
390639	2002 NC_{15}	—	July 5, 2002	Socorro	LINEAR	ADE	2.4 km	MPC · JPL
390640	2002 NE_{48}	—	July 14, 2002	Palomar	NEAT	·	2.0 km	MPC · JPL
390641	2002 NB_{60}	—	July 13, 2002	Palomar	NEAT	·	910 m	MPC · JPL
390642	2002 NV_{68}	—	July 14, 2002	Palomar	NEAT	·	1.1 km	MPC · JPL
390643	2002 OS_{13}	—	July 18, 2002	Socorro	LINEAR	·	2.5 km	MPC · JPL
390644	2002 OR_{30}	—	July 16, 2002	Palomar	NEAT	·	2.7 km	MPC · JPL
390645	2002 PX_{40}	—	August 4, 2002	Socorro	LINEAR	·	2.6 km	MPC · JPL
390646	2002 PN_{56}	—	August 9, 2002	Socorro	LINEAR	·	720 m	MPC · JPL
390647	2002 PT_{60}	—	August 10, 2002	Socorro	LINEAR	·	3.9 km	MPC · JPL
390648	2002 PN_{88}	—	August 12, 2002	Anderson Mesa	LONEOS	·	2.0 km	MPC · JPL
390649	2002 PT_{102}	—	August 12, 2002	Socorro	LINEAR	·	1.2 km	MPC · JPL
390650	2002 PW_{103}	—	August 12, 2002	Socorro	LINEAR	JUN	1.4 km	MPC · JPL
390651	2002 PR_{167}	—	August 8, 2002	Palomar	NEAT	·	1.1 km	MPC · JPL
390652	2002 QS_{36}	—	August 28, 2002	Palomar	NEAT	·	810 m	MPC · JPL
390653	2002 QR_{65}	—	August 27, 2002	Palomar	NEAT	MAR	1.2 km	MPC · JPL
390654	2002 QW_{87}	—	August 27, 2002	Palomar	NEAT	·	710 m	MPC · JPL
390655	2002 QW_{102}	—	August 29, 2002	Palomar	Palomar	·	760 m	MPC · JPL
390656	2002 QN_{117}	—	August 16, 2002	Palomar	NEAT	·	1.9 km	MPC · JPL
390657	2002 QR_{118}	—	August 30, 2002	Palomar	NEAT	·	690 m	MPC · JPL
390658	2002 QY_{126}	—	August 30, 2002	Palomar	NEAT	·	1.7 km	MPC · JPL
390659	2002 QC_{135}	—	August 30, 2002	Palomar	NEAT	·	1.7 km	MPC · JPL
390660	2002 QY_{137}	—	August 17, 2002	Palomar	NEAT	·	1.5 km	MPC · JPL
390661	2002 RF_{45}	—	September 5, 2002	Socorro	LINEAR	·	3.4 km	MPC · JPL
390662	2002 RM_{76}	—	September 5, 2002	Socorro	LINEAR	·	760 m	MPC · JPL
390663	2002 RQ_{112}	—	September 6, 2002	Socorro	LINEAR	PHO	1.3 km	MPC · JPL
390664	2002 RT_{164}	—	September 12, 2002	Palomar	NEAT	·	2.2 km	MPC · JPL
390665	2002 RR_{210}	—	September 15, 2002	Kitt Peak	Spacewatch	·	1.9 km	MPC · JPL
390666	2002 RW_{232}	—	September 11, 2002	Palomar	White, M., M. Collins	HOF	2.2 km	MPC · JPL
390667	2002 RV_{266}	—	September 13, 2002	Palomar	NEAT	·	2.1 km	MPC · JPL
390668	2002 SL_{5}	—	September 27, 2002	Palomar	NEAT	H	530 m	MPC · JPL
390669	2002 SZ_{20}	—	September 26, 2002	Palomar	NEAT	BRA	1.5 km	MPC · JPL
390670	2002 SN_{55}	—	September 30, 2002	Socorro	LINEAR	·	2.2 km	MPC · JPL
390671	2002 SN_{72}	—	September 16, 2002	Palomar	NEAT	·	810 m	MPC · JPL
390672	2002 TE_{57}	—	October 2, 2002	Socorro	LINEAR	H	470 m	MPC · JPL
390673	2002 TJ_{60}	—	October 3, 2002	Palomar	NEAT	H	670 m	MPC · JPL
390674	2002 TV_{109}	—	October 2, 2002	Haleakala	NEAT	·	2.6 km	MPC · JPL
390675	2002 TP_{161}	—	October 5, 2002	Palomar	NEAT	H	640 m	MPC · JPL
390676	2002 TW_{228}	—	October 7, 2002	Haleakala	NEAT	·	2.0 km	MPC · JPL
390677	2002 TE_{241}	—	October 7, 2002	Socorro	LINEAR	·	830 m	MPC · JPL
390678	2002 TO_{255}	—	October 9, 2002	Socorro	LINEAR	JUN	1.1 km	MPC · JPL
390679	2002 TW_{277}	—	October 10, 2002	Socorro	LINEAR	H	550 m	MPC · JPL
390680	2002 TA_{291}	—	October 10, 2002	Socorro	LINEAR	·	1.8 km	MPC · JPL
390681	2002 TT_{322}	—	October 5, 2002	Apache Point	SDSS	·	1.6 km	MPC · JPL
390682	2002 TM_{353}	—	October 10, 2002	Apache Point	SDSS	EUN	1.2 km	MPC · JPL
390683	2002 TW_{365}	—	October 10, 2002	Apache Point	SDSS	HOF	2.7 km	MPC · JPL
390684	2002 UT_{4}	—	October 29, 2002	Socorro	LINEAR	PHO	1.0 km	MPC · JPL
390685	2002 UR_{44}	—	October 4, 2002	Socorro	LINEAR	·	2.1 km	MPC · JPL
390686	2002 UH_{51}	—	October 29, 2002	Apache Point	SDSS	EUN	1.7 km	MPC · JPL
390687	2002 VJ_{1}	—	November 2, 2002	La Palma	La Palma	·	2.0 km	MPC · JPL
390688	2002 VF_{8}	—	October 4, 2002	Socorro	LINEAR	·	2.4 km	MPC · JPL
390689	2002 VS_{91}	—	November 12, 2002	Socorro	LINEAR	·	370 m	MPC · JPL
390690	2002 VG_{112}	—	November 13, 2002	Socorro	LINEAR	·	860 m	MPC · JPL
390691	2002 XC_{15}	—	December 7, 2002	Desert Eagle	W. K. Y. Yeung	·	950 m	MPC · JPL
390692	2002 XE_{79}	—	December 11, 2002	Socorro	LINEAR	·	3.2 km	MPC · JPL
390693	2002 XB_{115}	—	December 5, 2002	Haleakala	NEAT	H	620 m	MPC · JPL
390694	2002 YT_{1}	—	December 27, 2002	Socorro	LINEAR	H	760 m	MPC · JPL
390695	2003 AY_{3}	—	January 3, 2003	Socorro	LINEAR	·	1.8 km	MPC · JPL
390696	2003 AZ_{48}	—	January 5, 2003	Socorro	LINEAR	·	2.6 km	MPC · JPL
390697	2003 AJ_{62}	—	January 8, 2003	Socorro	LINEAR	·	1.9 km	MPC · JPL
390698	2003 AO_{68}	—	January 1, 2003	Socorro	LINEAR	·	1.4 km	MPC · JPL
390699	2003 BF_{31}	—	January 27, 2003	Socorro	LINEAR	·	1.9 km	MPC · JPL
390700	2003 BA_{32}	—	January 27, 2003	Socorro	LINEAR	·	1.2 km	MPC · JPL

== 390701–390800 ==
back to top

Designation			Discovery			Properties		Ref
Permanent	Provisional	Named after	Date	Site	Discoverer(s)	Category	Diam.	Ref
390701	2003 BE_{77}	—	January 30, 2003	Anderson Mesa	LONEOS	·	1.2 km	MPC · JPL
390702	2003 BF_{87}	—	January 5, 2003	Kitt Peak	Spacewatch	·	3.3 km	MPC · JPL
390703	2003 BL_{89}	—	January 28, 2003	Kitt Peak	Spacewatch	·	2.5 km	MPC · JPL
390704	2003 CJ_{26}	—	February 10, 2003	Kitt Peak	Spacewatch	·	3.2 km	MPC · JPL
390705	2003 CK_{26}	—	February 10, 2003	Kitt Peak	Spacewatch	·	820 m	MPC · JPL
390706	2003 DO_{2}	—	February 22, 2003	Palomar	NEAT	NYS	1.0 km	MPC · JPL
390707	2003 DR_{24}	—	February 26, 2003	Campo Imperatore	CINEOS	·	1.3 km	MPC · JPL
390708	2003 EZ_{11}	—	March 6, 2003	Socorro	LINEAR	·	1.1 km	MPC · JPL
390709	2003 EJ_{43}	—	March 10, 2003	Kitt Peak	Spacewatch	·	1.1 km	MPC · JPL
390710	2003 FL_{18}	—	March 24, 2003	Kitt Peak	Spacewatch	EOS	2.3 km	MPC · JPL
390711	2003 FU_{24}	—	March 24, 2003	Kitt Peak	Spacewatch	·	2.8 km	MPC · JPL
390712	2003 FP_{46}	—	March 24, 2003	Kitt Peak	Spacewatch	·	1.2 km	MPC · JPL
390713	2003 FO_{67}	—	March 26, 2003	Palomar	NEAT	·	1.5 km	MPC · JPL
390714	2003 FU_{70}	—	March 26, 2003	Kitt Peak	Spacewatch	·	1.5 km	MPC · JPL
390715	2003 FS_{82}	—	March 27, 2003	Palomar	NEAT	·	1.8 km	MPC · JPL
390716	2003 FR_{89}	—	March 29, 2003	Anderson Mesa	LONEOS	·	2.7 km	MPC · JPL
390717	2003 FC_{105}	—	March 26, 2003	Palomar	NEAT	NYS	1.2 km	MPC · JPL
390718	2003 FB_{124}	—	March 30, 2003	Kitt Peak	M. W. Buie	MAS	720 m	MPC · JPL
390719	2003 GG_{1}	—	April 1, 2003	Socorro	LINEAR	·	1.7 km	MPC · JPL
390720	2003 GM_{7}	—	April 1, 2003	Socorro	LINEAR	TIR	3.3 km	MPC · JPL
390721	2003 GF_{43}	—	April 9, 2003	Palomar	NEAT	PHO	2.7 km	MPC · JPL
390722	2003 GG_{43}	—	April 9, 2003	Palomar	NEAT	·	2.9 km	MPC · JPL
390723	2003 GE_{46}	—	March 27, 2003	Anderson Mesa	LONEOS	·	1.3 km	MPC · JPL
390724	2003 GK_{56}	—	April 4, 2003	Kitt Peak	Spacewatch	·	1.7 km	MPC · JPL
390725	2003 HB	—	April 21, 2003	Socorro	LINEAR	ATE · PHA	290 m	MPC · JPL
390726	2003 HC_{58}	—	April 29, 2003	Kitt Peak	Spacewatch	·	1.6 km	MPC · JPL
390727	2003 JF_{11}	—	May 3, 2003	Kitt Peak	Spacewatch	·	4.2 km	MPC · JPL
390728	2003 JB_{12}	—	April 5, 2003	Kitt Peak	Spacewatch	EOS	2.3 km	MPC · JPL
390729	2003 JU_{12}	—	May 5, 2003	Haleakala	NEAT	·	3.7 km	MPC · JPL
390730	2003 JK_{18}	—	May 3, 2003	Kitt Peak	Spacewatch	HYG	2.8 km	MPC · JPL
390731	2003 MR_{1}	—	June 23, 2003	Socorro	LINEAR	·	3.4 km	MPC · JPL
390732	2003 NC_{1}	—	July 2, 2003	Haleakala	NEAT	·	1.5 km	MPC · JPL
390733	2003 OS	—	July 20, 2003	Socorro	LINEAR	·	1.8 km	MPC · JPL
390734	2003 OM_{9}	—	July 23, 2003	Palomar	NEAT	·	1.2 km	MPC · JPL
390735	2003 QY_{62}	—	August 23, 2003	Socorro	LINEAR	·	1.8 km	MPC · JPL
390736	2003 RE_{17}	—	September 15, 2003	Palomar	NEAT	(5)	1.4 km	MPC · JPL
390737	2003 RQ_{25}	—	September 15, 2003	Palomar	NEAT	·	1.5 km	MPC · JPL
390738	2003 SB_{5}	—	September 16, 2003	Kitt Peak	Spacewatch	·	2.5 km	MPC · JPL
390739	2003 SX_{50}	—	August 25, 2003	Socorro	LINEAR	EUN	1.2 km	MPC · JPL
390740	2003 SO_{53}	—	September 16, 2003	Kitt Peak	Spacewatch	·	1.6 km	MPC · JPL
390741	2003 SK_{81}	—	September 19, 2003	Haleakala	NEAT	·	1.4 km	MPC · JPL
390742	2003 SY_{93}	—	September 18, 2003	Kitt Peak	Spacewatch	T_{j} (2.94) · HIL	5.3 km	MPC · JPL
390743 Telkesmária	2003 SD_{129}	Telkesmária	September 20, 2003	Piszkéstető	K. Sárneczky, B. Sipőcz	BAR	1.4 km	MPC · JPL
390744	2003 SS_{139}	—	September 18, 2003	Kitt Peak	Spacewatch	·	1.2 km	MPC · JPL
390745	2003 SB_{161}	—	September 17, 2003	Palomar	NEAT	·	1.2 km	MPC · JPL
390746	2003 SC_{166}	—	September 2, 2003	Socorro	LINEAR	·	1.8 km	MPC · JPL
390747	2003 SQ_{186}	—	September 24, 2003	Socorro	LINEAR	·	2.4 km	MPC · JPL
390748	2003 SD_{194}	—	September 20, 2003	Haleakala	NEAT	·	2.2 km	MPC · JPL
390749	2003 SP_{225}	—	September 26, 2003	Socorro	LINEAR	·	2.1 km	MPC · JPL
390750	2003 SR_{284}	—	September 20, 2003	Socorro	LINEAR	ADE	3.5 km	MPC · JPL
390751	2003 SF_{301}	—	September 17, 2003	Palomar	NEAT	·	1.1 km	MPC · JPL
390752	2003 SJ_{302}	—	September 17, 2003	Palomar	NEAT	·	1.0 km	MPC · JPL
390753	2003 SA_{306}	—	September 30, 2003	Socorro	LINEAR	·	2.3 km	MPC · JPL
390754	2003 SP_{308}	—	September 29, 2003	Anderson Mesa	LONEOS	·	1.9 km	MPC · JPL
390755	2003 SV_{312}	—	September 17, 2003	Palomar	NEAT	·	2.0 km	MPC · JPL
390756	2003 SZ_{323}	—	September 16, 2003	Kitt Peak	Spacewatch	·	1.4 km	MPC · JPL
390757	2003 SY_{326}	—	September 18, 2003	Kitt Peak	Spacewatch	·	830 m	MPC · JPL
390758	2003 ST_{331}	—	September 27, 2003	Kitt Peak	Spacewatch	·	1.7 km	MPC · JPL
390759	2003 SU_{365}	—	September 26, 2003	Apache Point	SDSS	·	1.7 km	MPC · JPL
390760	2003 SP_{393}	—	September 26, 2003	Apache Point	SDSS	·	1.4 km	MPC · JPL
390761	2003 SJ_{420}	—	September 17, 2003	Kitt Peak	Spacewatch	·	2.3 km	MPC · JPL
390762	2003 SN_{433}	—	September 29, 2003	Kitt Peak	Spacewatch	·	2.2 km	MPC · JPL
390763	2003 TR_{19}	—	October 15, 2003	Palomar	NEAT	EUN	1.4 km	MPC · JPL
390764	2003 TH_{25}	—	October 1, 2003	Kitt Peak	Spacewatch	MAR	820 m	MPC · JPL
390765	2003 TW_{33}	—	October 1, 2003	Kitt Peak	Spacewatch	·	1.3 km	MPC · JPL
390766	2003 TT_{38}	—	September 21, 2003	Kitt Peak	Spacewatch	·	1.8 km	MPC · JPL
390767	2003 UU_{5}	—	October 18, 2003	Palomar	NEAT	·	2.3 km	MPC · JPL
390768	2003 UY_{89}	—	October 20, 2003	Palomar	NEAT	·	1.6 km	MPC · JPL
390769	2003 UN_{118}	—	October 17, 2003	Kitt Peak	Spacewatch	·	1.8 km	MPC · JPL
390770	2003 UZ_{126}	—	October 21, 2003	Kitt Peak	Spacewatch	·	3.4 km	MPC · JPL
390771	2003 UU_{137}	—	October 21, 2003	Socorro	LINEAR	·	1.8 km	MPC · JPL
390772	2003 UR_{140}	—	September 28, 2003	Anderson Mesa	LONEOS	·	1.8 km	MPC · JPL
390773	2003 UR_{155}	—	October 5, 2003	Kitt Peak	Spacewatch	EOS	2.4 km	MPC · JPL
390774	2003 UJ_{188}	—	October 22, 2003	Socorro	LINEAR	·	3.2 km	MPC · JPL
390775	2003 UW_{211}	—	October 23, 2003	Kitt Peak	Spacewatch	·	1.7 km	MPC · JPL
390776	2003 UN_{270}	—	October 17, 2003	Palomar	NEAT	MAR	930 m	MPC · JPL
390777	2003 UB_{316}	—	October 22, 2003	Anderson Mesa	LONEOS	·	2.4 km	MPC · JPL
390778	2003 UV_{320}	—	October 24, 2003	Socorro	LINEAR	EUN	1.3 km	MPC · JPL
390779	2003 WY_{6}	—	September 28, 2003	Socorro	LINEAR	·	2.1 km	MPC · JPL
390780	2003 WM_{93}	—	November 19, 2003	Anderson Mesa	LONEOS	·	1.8 km	MPC · JPL
390781	2003 WG_{105}	—	November 21, 2003	Socorro	LINEAR	·	1.8 km	MPC · JPL
390782	2003 WQ_{109}	—	November 20, 2003	Socorro	LINEAR	·	1.6 km	MPC · JPL
390783	2003 WG_{130}	—	November 21, 2003	Socorro	LINEAR	·	2.1 km	MPC · JPL
390784	2003 WW_{175}	—	November 19, 2003	Kitt Peak	Spacewatch	·	1.7 km	MPC · JPL
390785	2003 WC_{183}	—	November 23, 2003	Kitt Peak	M. W. Buie	·	2.3 km	MPC · JPL
390786	2003 XS_{1}	—	December 1, 2003	Socorro	LINEAR	·	2.0 km	MPC · JPL
390787	2003 YH_{10}	—	December 17, 2003	Socorro	LINEAR	·	1.6 km	MPC · JPL
390788	2003 YP_{48}	—	December 18, 2003	Socorro	LINEAR	·	2.4 km	MPC · JPL
390789	2004 BH_{47}	—	January 21, 2004	Socorro	LINEAR	DOR	2.2 km	MPC · JPL
390790	2004 BE_{110}	—	January 28, 2004	Catalina	CSS	·	2.4 km	MPC · JPL
390791	2004 BM_{147}	—	January 22, 2004	Socorro	LINEAR	·	2.8 km	MPC · JPL
390792	2004 BL_{149}	—	January 16, 2004	Kitt Peak	Spacewatch	·	2.3 km	MPC · JPL
390793	2004 CN_{8}	—	February 11, 2004	Kitt Peak	Spacewatch	·	1.6 km	MPC · JPL
390794	2004 CY_{115}	—	January 22, 2004	Socorro	LINEAR	·	2.8 km	MPC · JPL
390795	2004 CJ_{130}	—	February 14, 2004	Socorro	LINEAR	·	1.9 km	MPC · JPL
390796	2004 DT_{4}	—	February 16, 2004	Kitt Peak	Spacewatch	MRX	1.3 km	MPC · JPL
390797	2004 ER_{28}	—	March 15, 2004	Kitt Peak	Spacewatch	KOR	1.2 km	MPC · JPL
390798	2004 FG_{8}	—	March 16, 2004	Kitt Peak	Spacewatch	·	590 m	MPC · JPL
390799	2004 FZ_{59}	—	February 17, 2004	Kitt Peak	Spacewatch	·	2.0 km	MPC · JPL
390800	2004 FG_{61}	—	March 19, 2004	Socorro	LINEAR	·	1.7 km	MPC · JPL

== 390801–390900 ==
back to top

Designation			Discovery			Properties		Ref
Permanent	Provisional	Named after	Date	Site	Discoverer(s)	Category	Diam.	Ref
390801	2004 FL_{104}	—	March 15, 2004	Kitt Peak	Spacewatch	·	1.6 km	MPC · JPL
390802	2004 GS_{19}	—	April 15, 2004	Socorro	LINEAR	·	1.4 km	MPC · JPL
390803	2004 GX_{32}	—	April 12, 2004	Palomar	NEAT	PHO	1.2 km	MPC · JPL
390804	2004 GS_{72}	—	April 14, 2004	Kitt Peak	Spacewatch	·	660 m	MPC · JPL
390805	2004 GW_{82}	—	March 31, 2004	Kitt Peak	Spacewatch	·	1.8 km	MPC · JPL
390806	2004 HD_{36}	—	April 21, 2004	Catalina	CSS	·	630 m	MPC · JPL
390807	2004 HA_{47}	—	April 22, 2004	Socorro	LINEAR	·	850 m	MPC · JPL
390808	2004 HK_{52}	—	April 24, 2004	Socorro	LINEAR	·	410 m	MPC · JPL
390809	2004 HU_{65}	—	March 31, 2004	Kitt Peak	Spacewatch	·	650 m	MPC · JPL
390810	2004 HF_{67}	—	April 21, 2004	Kitt Peak	Spacewatch	·	730 m	MPC · JPL
390811	2004 HY_{69}	—	April 23, 2004	Kitt Peak	Spacewatch	·	2.1 km	MPC · JPL
390812	2004 JQ_{6}	—	May 10, 2004	Haleakala	NEAT	·	2.4 km	MPC · JPL
390813 Debwatson	2004 JY_{6}	Debwatson	May 13, 2004	Hunters Hill	Higgins, D.	H	730 m	MPC · JPL
390814	2004 JD_{16}	—	May 11, 2004	Anderson Mesa	LONEOS	·	920 m	MPC · JPL
390815	2004 JW_{44}	—	May 9, 2004	Kitt Peak	Spacewatch	·	4.0 km	MPC · JPL
390816	2004 KQ_{6}	—	May 18, 2004	Socorro	LINEAR	·	730 m	MPC · JPL
390817	2004 KW_{18}	—	May 22, 2004	Apache Point	SDSS	·	2.1 km	MPC · JPL
390818	2004 KX_{18}	—	May 22, 2004	Apache Point	SDSS	·	3.0 km	MPC · JPL
390819	2004 LE_{2}	—	June 11, 2004	Siding Spring	SSS	·	670 m	MPC · JPL
390820	2004 LQ_{23}	—	June 14, 2004	Siding Spring	SSS	T_{j} (2.99) · EUP	4.8 km	MPC · JPL
390821	2004 MW_{4}	—	June 22, 2004	Reedy Creek	J. Broughton	·	990 m	MPC · JPL
390822	2004 NG_{16}	—	July 11, 2004	Socorro	LINEAR	·	1.3 km	MPC · JPL
390823	2004 NQ_{23}	—	July 14, 2004	Socorro	LINEAR	PHO	950 m	MPC · JPL
390824	2004 OT	—	July 17, 2004	7300	W. K. Y. Yeung	·	1.1 km	MPC · JPL
390825	2004 OA_{3}	—	July 16, 2004	Socorro	LINEAR	PHO	1.2 km	MPC · JPL
390826	2004 OB_{11}	—	July 22, 2004	Anderson Mesa	LONEOS	·	4.9 km	MPC · JPL
390827	2004 PD_{17}	—	June 27, 2004	Catalina	CSS	PHO	1.4 km	MPC · JPL
390828	2004 PV_{17}	—	August 8, 2004	Socorro	LINEAR	MAS	810 m	MPC · JPL
390829	2004 PU_{20}	—	August 6, 2004	Palomar	NEAT	·	1.0 km	MPC · JPL
390830	2004 PP_{34}	—	August 8, 2004	Anderson Mesa	LONEOS	·	1.5 km	MPC · JPL
390831	2004 PF_{44}	—	August 7, 2004	Palomar	NEAT	·	2.8 km	MPC · JPL
390832	2004 PX_{64}	—	August 10, 2004	Socorro	LINEAR	·	2.4 km	MPC · JPL
390833	2004 PH_{88}	—	August 11, 2004	Socorro	LINEAR	·	4.0 km	MPC · JPL
390834	2004 PM_{99}	—	August 10, 2004	Socorro	LINEAR	·	970 m	MPC · JPL
390835	2004 PJ_{100}	—	August 12, 2004	Socorro	LINEAR	·	3.2 km	MPC · JPL
390836	2004 PV_{110}	—	August 14, 2004	Cerro Tololo	M. W. Buie	·	900 m	MPC · JPL
390837	2004 QV_{4}	—	August 21, 2004	Catalina	CSS	·	1.5 km	MPC · JPL
390838	2004 QM_{12}	—	August 21, 2004	Siding Spring	SSS	·	3.5 km	MPC · JPL
390839	2004 RU_{8}	—	September 6, 2004	Goodricke-Pigott	Goodricke-Pigott	·	1.8 km	MPC · JPL
390840	2004 RL_{23}	—	September 7, 2004	Kitt Peak	Spacewatch	V	740 m	MPC · JPL
390841	2004 RJ_{44}	—	September 8, 2004	Socorro	LINEAR	·	2.9 km	MPC · JPL
390842	2004 RJ_{71}	—	September 8, 2004	Socorro	LINEAR	·	1.3 km	MPC · JPL
390843	2004 RP_{71}	—	September 8, 2004	Socorro	LINEAR	NYS	950 m	MPC · JPL
390844	2004 RB_{87}	—	September 7, 2004	Palomar	NEAT	·	1.6 km	MPC · JPL
390845	2004 RT_{122}	—	September 7, 2004	Kitt Peak	Spacewatch	·	1.0 km	MPC · JPL
390846	2004 RV_{138}	—	September 8, 2004	Palomar	NEAT	·	2.5 km	MPC · JPL
390847	2004 RY_{161}	—	September 11, 2004	Socorro	LINEAR	·	2.7 km	MPC · JPL
390848 Veerle	2004 RB_{165}	Veerle	September 8, 2004	Uccle	T. Pauwels, P. De Cat	V	630 m	MPC · JPL
390849	2004 RF_{175}	—	September 10, 2004	Socorro	LINEAR	V	800 m	MPC · JPL
390850	2004 RH_{181}	—	September 10, 2004	Socorro	LINEAR	·	1.3 km	MPC · JPL
390851	2004 RD_{183}	—	September 10, 2004	Socorro	LINEAR	·	930 m	MPC · JPL
390852	2004 RX_{183}	—	September 10, 2004	Socorro	LINEAR	·	1.3 km	MPC · JPL
390853	2004 RO_{194}	—	September 10, 2004	Socorro	LINEAR	·	3.6 km	MPC · JPL
390854	2004 RJ_{208}	—	September 11, 2004	Socorro	LINEAR	·	5.8 km	MPC · JPL
390855	2004 RR_{217}	—	September 11, 2004	Socorro	LINEAR	·	1.5 km	MPC · JPL
390856	2004 RR_{218}	—	September 11, 2004	Socorro	LINEAR	EUP	3.8 km	MPC · JPL
390857	2004 RS_{243}	—	September 10, 2004	Kitt Peak	Spacewatch	THM	3.3 km	MPC · JPL
390858	2004 RC_{244}	—	September 10, 2004	Kitt Peak	Spacewatch	·	1.2 km	MPC · JPL
390859	2004 RC_{276}	—	September 13, 2004	Kitt Peak	Spacewatch	·	3.3 km	MPC · JPL
390860	2004 RK_{319}	—	September 13, 2004	Kitt Peak	Spacewatch	·	1.2 km	MPC · JPL
390861	2004 RL_{319}	—	September 13, 2004	Kitt Peak	Spacewatch	CYB	3.6 km	MPC · JPL
390862	2004 SU_{7}	—	September 17, 2004	Kitt Peak	Spacewatch	·	980 m	MPC · JPL
390863	2004 SY_{60}	—	September 17, 2004	Kitt Peak	Spacewatch	·	1.1 km	MPC · JPL
390864	2004 TH_{31}	—	October 4, 2004	Kitt Peak	Spacewatch	·	970 m	MPC · JPL
390865	2004 TE_{42}	—	October 4, 2004	Kitt Peak	Spacewatch	·	1.3 km	MPC · JPL
390866	2004 TY_{75}	—	October 6, 2004	Palomar	NEAT	·	1.3 km	MPC · JPL
390867	2004 TY_{97}	—	October 5, 2004	Kitt Peak	Spacewatch	PHO	1.2 km	MPC · JPL
390868	2004 TW_{107}	—	October 7, 2004	Socorro	LINEAR	·	3.1 km	MPC · JPL
390869	2004 TT_{117}	—	October 5, 2004	Anderson Mesa	LONEOS	·	1.8 km	MPC · JPL
390870	2004 TV_{129}	—	October 7, 2004	Socorro	LINEAR	·	1.4 km	MPC · JPL
390871	2004 TE_{130}	—	October 7, 2004	Socorro	LINEAR	·	1.6 km	MPC · JPL
390872	2004 TL_{130}	—	August 13, 2004	Socorro	LINEAR	·	880 m	MPC · JPL
390873	2004 TT_{164}	—	October 6, 2004	Kitt Peak	Spacewatch	(5)	950 m	MPC · JPL
390874	2004 TG_{168}	—	October 7, 2004	Socorro	LINEAR	·	2.3 km	MPC · JPL
390875	2004 TC_{204}	—	October 7, 2004	Kitt Peak	Spacewatch	V	900 m	MPC · JPL
390876	2004 TV_{239}	—	September 22, 2004	Desert Eagle	W. K. Y. Yeung	·	1.2 km	MPC · JPL
390877	2004 TH_{242}	—	October 13, 2004	Moletai	K. Černis, Zdanavicius, J.	·	1.3 km	MPC · JPL
390878	2004 TQ_{263}	—	October 9, 2004	Kitt Peak	Spacewatch	MRX	1.0 km	MPC · JPL
390879	2004 TV_{287}	—	October 9, 2004	Socorro	LINEAR	H	760 m	MPC · JPL
390880	2004 TR_{296}	—	October 10, 2004	Kitt Peak	Spacewatch	·	2.3 km	MPC · JPL
390881	2004 TZ_{333}	—	October 9, 2004	Kitt Peak	Spacewatch	V	850 m	MPC · JPL
390882	2004 VY_{66}	—	November 7, 2004	Socorro	LINEAR	MAS	770 m	MPC · JPL
390883	2004 VH_{71}	—	November 9, 2004	Catalina	CSS	·	930 m	MPC · JPL
390884	2004 VB_{78}	—	November 11, 2004	Kitt Peak	Kitt Peak	·	1.7 km	MPC · JPL
390885	2004 XE_{41}	—	December 3, 2004	Kitt Peak	Spacewatch	(5)	1.1 km	MPC · JPL
390886	2004 XU_{59}	—	December 11, 2004	Kitt Peak	Spacewatch	·	1.2 km	MPC · JPL
390887	2004 XX_{61}	—	November 20, 2004	Kitt Peak	Spacewatch	·	1.8 km	MPC · JPL
390888	2004 XK_{85}	—	December 12, 2004	Kitt Peak	Spacewatch	JUN	1.3 km	MPC · JPL
390889	2004 XS_{110}	—	December 14, 2004	Catalina	CSS	·	1.1 km	MPC · JPL
390890	2004 XP_{135}	—	December 2, 2004	Kitt Peak	Spacewatch	·	1.3 km	MPC · JPL
390891	2004 YS_{23}	—	December 19, 2004	Mount Lemmon	Mount Lemmon Survey	·	1.3 km	MPC · JPL
390892	2004 YW_{27}	—	December 17, 2004	Socorro	LINEAR	·	1.2 km	MPC · JPL
390893	2005 AF_{38}	—	January 13, 2005	Catalina	CSS	·	2.4 km	MPC · JPL
390894	2005 AK_{50}	—	January 13, 2005	Socorro	LINEAR	·	2.6 km	MPC · JPL
390895	2005 AP_{75}	—	January 15, 2005	Kitt Peak	Spacewatch	(5)	1.3 km	MPC · JPL
390896	2005 BV_{7}	—	January 6, 2005	Socorro	LINEAR	EUN	1.6 km	MPC · JPL
390897	2005 BA_{25}	—	January 17, 2005	Socorro	LINEAR	·	2.2 km	MPC · JPL
390898	2005 CW_{28}	—	February 1, 2005	Kitt Peak	Spacewatch	·	1.6 km	MPC · JPL
390899	2005 CD_{36}	—	February 3, 2005	Socorro	LINEAR	·	2.0 km	MPC · JPL
390900	2005 ES_{29}	—	March 2, 2005	Calvin-Rehoboth	Calvin College	JUN	990 m	MPC · JPL

== 390901–391000 ==
back to top

Designation			Discovery			Properties		Ref
Permanent	Provisional	Named after	Date	Site	Discoverer(s)	Category	Diam.	Ref
390901	2005 EB_{34}	—	March 1, 2005	Kitt Peak	Spacewatch	·	1.9 km	MPC · JPL
390902	2005 EA_{53}	—	March 4, 2005	Kitt Peak	Spacewatch	·	1.5 km	MPC · JPL
390903	2005 EE_{63}	—	March 4, 2005	Mount Lemmon	Mount Lemmon Survey	·	2.4 km	MPC · JPL
390904	2005 EE_{77}	—	March 3, 2005	Kitt Peak	Spacewatch	·	1.8 km	MPC · JPL
390905	2005 EA_{84}	—	March 4, 2005	Catalina	CSS	·	3.1 km	MPC · JPL
390906	2005 ED_{92}	—	March 8, 2005	Anderson Mesa	LONEOS	·	2.4 km	MPC · JPL
390907	2005 EW_{94}	—	March 10, 2005	Mayhill	Lowe, A.	EUN	1.5 km	MPC · JPL
390908	2005 EQ_{96}	—	March 3, 2005	Catalina	CSS	·	2.4 km	MPC · JPL
390909	2005 EV_{100}	—	March 3, 2005	Catalina	CSS	JUN	1.6 km	MPC · JPL
390910	2005 EQ_{105}	—	March 4, 2005	Mount Lemmon	Mount Lemmon Survey	·	1.7 km	MPC · JPL
390911	2005 EB_{117}	—	March 4, 2005	Mount Lemmon	Mount Lemmon Survey	·	1.8 km	MPC · JPL
390912	2005 EQ_{119}	—	March 7, 2005	Socorro	LINEAR	·	2.0 km	MPC · JPL
390913	2005 EN_{168}	—	March 1, 2005	Kitt Peak	Spacewatch	·	1.8 km	MPC · JPL
390914	2005 EB_{178}	—	February 2, 2005	Catalina	CSS	·	2.2 km	MPC · JPL
390915	2005 EE_{179}	—	March 9, 2005	Kitt Peak	Spacewatch	·	1.7 km	MPC · JPL
390916	2005 EF_{188}	—	March 10, 2005	Mount Lemmon	Mount Lemmon Survey	·	2.3 km	MPC · JPL
390917	2005 EZ_{198}	—	March 11, 2005	Mount Lemmon	Mount Lemmon Survey	·	1.7 km	MPC · JPL
390918	2005 EU_{202}	—	March 10, 2005	Mount Lemmon	Mount Lemmon Survey	·	750 m	MPC · JPL
390919	2005 EF_{205}	—	March 11, 2005	Kitt Peak	Spacewatch	·	2.3 km	MPC · JPL
390920	2005 EG_{235}	—	March 10, 2005	Mount Lemmon	Mount Lemmon Survey	AEO	1 km	MPC · JPL
390921	2005 EH_{241}	—	March 11, 2005	Catalina	CSS	·	1.8 km	MPC · JPL
390922	2005 EY_{243}	—	March 11, 2005	Anderson Mesa	LONEOS	·	2.3 km	MPC · JPL
390923	2005 EG_{247}	—	March 12, 2005	Socorro	LINEAR	·	2.7 km	MPC · JPL
390924	2005 ET_{256}	—	March 11, 2005	Mount Lemmon	Mount Lemmon Survey	·	1.5 km	MPC · JPL
390925	2005 EQ_{284}	—	October 30, 2002	Kitt Peak	Spacewatch	·	1.7 km	MPC · JPL
390926	2005 ED_{331}	—	March 11, 2005	Catalina	CSS	·	1.8 km	MPC · JPL
390927	2005 FO	—	March 17, 2005	Kitt Peak	Spacewatch	·	2.2 km	MPC · JPL
390928	2005 GU_{3}	—	April 1, 2005	Kitt Peak	Spacewatch	MRX	1.2 km	MPC · JPL
390929	2005 GP_{21}	—	April 4, 2005	Mount Lemmon	Mount Lemmon Survey	AMO · APO · PHA	290 m	MPC · JPL
390930	2005 GX_{24}	—	April 2, 2005	Kitt Peak	Spacewatch	·	2.1 km	MPC · JPL
390931	2005 GR_{36}	—	April 2, 2005	Mount Lemmon	Mount Lemmon Survey	·	2.3 km	MPC · JPL
390932	2005 GZ_{37}	—	April 3, 2005	Socorro	LINEAR	·	2.4 km	MPC · JPL
390933	2005 GM_{48}	—	April 5, 2005	Mount Lemmon	Mount Lemmon Survey	NEM	2.0 km	MPC · JPL
390934	2005 GP_{52}	—	April 2, 2005	Mount Lemmon	Mount Lemmon Survey	·	2.2 km	MPC · JPL
390935	2005 GR_{73}	—	April 4, 2005	Catalina	CSS	526	3.3 km	MPC · JPL
390936	2005 GA_{104}	—	April 9, 2005	Catalina	CSS	TIN	2.4 km	MPC · JPL
390937	2005 GZ_{108}	—	April 10, 2005	Mount Lemmon	Mount Lemmon Survey	·	2.0 km	MPC · JPL
390938	2005 GS_{126}	—	April 11, 2005	Mount Lemmon	Mount Lemmon Survey	·	2.2 km	MPC · JPL
390939	2005 GM_{137}	—	April 11, 2005	Kitt Peak	Spacewatch	·	1.9 km	MPC · JPL
390940	2005 GO_{170}	—	April 12, 2005	Socorro	LINEAR	JUN	2.5 km	MPC · JPL
390941	2005 GS_{206}	—	April 7, 2005	Kitt Peak	Spacewatch	GEF	1.6 km	MPC · JPL
390942	2005 GW_{227}	—	April 6, 2005	Catalina	CSS	·	2.6 km	MPC · JPL
390943	2005 JP_{8}	—	November 24, 2003	Kitt Peak	Spacewatch	·	1.8 km	MPC · JPL
390944	2005 JQ_{48}	—	May 3, 2005	Kitt Peak	Spacewatch	·	1.8 km	MPC · JPL
390945	2005 JN_{51}	—	May 4, 2005	Kitt Peak	Spacewatch	·	2.0 km	MPC · JPL
390946	2005 JS_{132}	—	May 14, 2005	Kitt Peak	Spacewatch	·	1.9 km	MPC · JPL
390947	2005 JM_{138}	—	May 13, 2005	Kitt Peak	Spacewatch	·	2.6 km	MPC · JPL
390948	2005 JT_{147}	—	May 13, 2005	Kitt Peak	Spacewatch	·	3.2 km	MPC · JPL
390949	2005 JO_{171}	—	April 6, 2005	Mount Lemmon	Mount Lemmon Survey	·	2.3 km	MPC · JPL
390950	2005 LP_{1}	—	June 1, 2005	Mount Lemmon	Mount Lemmon Survey	·	1.6 km	MPC · JPL
390951	2005 LU_{33}	—	June 10, 2005	Kitt Peak	Spacewatch	AGN	1.4 km	MPC · JPL
390952	2005 LF_{37}	—	June 6, 2005	Kitt Peak	Spacewatch	·	2.3 km	MPC · JPL
390953	2005 MV_{20}	—	September 29, 2000	Anderson Mesa	LONEOS	·	3.8 km	MPC · JPL
390954	2005 MK_{26}	—	June 13, 2005	Kitt Peak	Spacewatch	·	3.3 km	MPC · JPL
390955	2005 ME_{35}	—	June 30, 2005	Kitt Peak	Spacewatch	·	620 m	MPC · JPL
390956	2005 NL_{41}	—	July 4, 2005	Mount Lemmon	Mount Lemmon Survey	·	2.3 km	MPC · JPL
390957	2005 NL_{49}	—	July 5, 2005	Palomar	NEAT	·	2.5 km	MPC · JPL
390958	2005 NG_{61}	—	July 11, 2005	Kitt Peak	Spacewatch	·	690 m	MPC · JPL
390959	2005 OM_{5}	—	July 28, 2005	Palomar	NEAT	·	1.0 km	MPC · JPL
390960	2005 OY_{26}	—	July 30, 2005	Palomar	NEAT	·	3.6 km	MPC · JPL
390961	2005 OQ_{31}	—	July 30, 2005	Palomar	NEAT	EOS	1.8 km	MPC · JPL
390962	2005 PU_{20}	—	July 5, 2005	Mount Lemmon	Mount Lemmon Survey	·	2.8 km	MPC · JPL
390963	2005 QJ_{5}	—	August 22, 2005	Palomar	NEAT	·	630 m	MPC · JPL
390964	2005 QA_{27}	—	August 27, 2005	Kitt Peak	Spacewatch	·	3.2 km	MPC · JPL
390965	2005 QU_{47}	—	August 26, 2005	Palomar	NEAT	·	3.2 km	MPC · JPL
390966	2005 QS_{71}	—	August 26, 2005	Anderson Mesa	LONEOS	·	700 m	MPC · JPL
390967	2005 QM_{76}	—	August 24, 2005	Palomar	NEAT	·	3.2 km	MPC · JPL
390968	2005 QX_{120}	—	August 28, 2005	Kitt Peak	Spacewatch	·	1.1 km	MPC · JPL
390969	2005 QM_{125}	—	August 28, 2005	Kitt Peak	Spacewatch	·	2.9 km	MPC · JPL
390970	2005 QH_{127}	—	August 28, 2005	Kitt Peak	Spacewatch	·	4.2 km	MPC · JPL
390971	2005 QS_{132}	—	August 28, 2005	Kitt Peak	Spacewatch	VER	4.7 km	MPC · JPL
390972	2005 QG_{136}	—	August 28, 2005	Kitt Peak	Spacewatch	HYG	3.0 km	MPC · JPL
390973	2005 QE_{173}	—	August 29, 2005	Palomar	NEAT	·	1.1 km	MPC · JPL
390974	2005 QP_{180}	—	August 28, 2005	Kitt Peak	Spacewatch	·	780 m	MPC · JPL
390975	2005 QS_{181}	—	August 31, 2005	Anderson Mesa	LONEOS	H	480 m	MPC · JPL
390976	2005 RZ_{21}	—	August 27, 2005	Anderson Mesa	LONEOS	TIR	3.5 km	MPC · JPL
390977	2005 RB_{31}	—	September 11, 2005	Kitt Peak	Spacewatch	·	780 m	MPC · JPL
390978	2005 RK_{33}	—	September 14, 2005	Catalina	CSS	PHO	1.2 km	MPC · JPL
390979	2005 SU_{6}	—	September 23, 2005	Kitt Peak	Spacewatch	·	870 m	MPC · JPL
390980	2005 SX_{7}	—	September 25, 2005	Catalina	CSS	·	2.4 km	MPC · JPL
390981	2005 SC_{12}	—	September 23, 2005	Kitt Peak	Spacewatch	·	840 m	MPC · JPL
390982	2005 SZ_{19}	—	September 25, 2005	Kingsnake	J. V. McClusky	·	1.1 km	MPC · JPL
390983	2005 SO_{21}	—	September 25, 2005	Kitt Peak	Spacewatch	TIR	3.4 km	MPC · JPL
390984	2005 SK_{25}	—	August 29, 2005	Kitt Peak	Spacewatch	T_{j} (2.99) · EUP ·	3.8 km	MPC · JPL
390985	2005 SR_{34}	—	September 23, 2005	Kitt Peak	Spacewatch	·	690 m	MPC · JPL
390986	2005 SW_{36}	—	September 24, 2005	Kitt Peak	Spacewatch	·	2.8 km	MPC · JPL
390987	2005 SN_{50}	—	September 24, 2005	Kitt Peak	Spacewatch	·	980 m	MPC · JPL
390988	2005 ST_{51}	—	September 24, 2005	Kitt Peak	Spacewatch	·	3.2 km	MPC · JPL
390989	2005 SV_{59}	—	September 26, 2005	Kitt Peak	Spacewatch	ELF	3.8 km	MPC · JPL
390990	2005 SP_{68}	—	September 27, 2005	Kitt Peak	Spacewatch	·	3.3 km	MPC · JPL
390991	2005 SG_{85}	—	September 24, 2005	Kitt Peak	Spacewatch	·	2.6 km	MPC · JPL
390992	2005 SM_{86}	—	September 24, 2005	Kitt Peak	Spacewatch	·	3.7 km	MPC · JPL
390993	2005 SF_{88}	—	September 24, 2005	Kitt Peak	Spacewatch	·	790 m	MPC · JPL
390994	2005 SR_{88}	—	September 24, 2005	Kitt Peak	Spacewatch	·	3.0 km	MPC · JPL
390995	2005 SF_{89}	—	September 24, 2005	Kitt Peak	Spacewatch	·	780 m	MPC · JPL
390996	2005 ST_{89}	—	September 24, 2005	Kitt Peak	Spacewatch	·	2.6 km	MPC · JPL
390997	2005 SN_{93}	—	September 24, 2005	Kitt Peak	Spacewatch	·	4.5 km	MPC · JPL
390998	2005 SA_{97}	—	September 25, 2005	Kitt Peak	Spacewatch	EOS	2.1 km	MPC · JPL
390999	2005 SQ_{98}	—	September 25, 2005	Kitt Peak	Spacewatch	·	1.1 km	MPC · JPL
391000	2005 SC_{99}	—	September 25, 2005	Kitt Peak	Spacewatch	·	1.7 km	MPC · JPL

back to top

== See also ==
- Meanings of minor-planet names: 390001–391000
