= List of minor planets: 388001–389000 =

The following is a partial list of minor planets, running from minor-planet number 388001 through 389000, inclusive. The primary data for this and other partial lists is based on JPL's "Small-Body Orbital Elements" and data available from the Minor Planet Center. Critical list information is also provided by the MPC, unless otherwise specified from Lowell Observatory. A detailed description of the table's columns and additional sources are given on the main page including a complete list of every page in this series, and a statistical break-up on the dynamical classification of minor planets.

Also see the summary list of all named bodies in numerical and alphabetical order, and the corresponding naming citations for the number range of this particular list. New namings may only be added to this list after official publication, as the preannouncement of names is condemned by the Working Group for Small Bodies Nomenclature of the International Astronomical Union.

| Near-Earth obj. | MBA (inner) | MBA (outer) | Centaur |
| Mars-crosser | MBA (middle) | Jupiter trojan | Trans-Neptunian obj. |
| Unclassified |

== 388001–388100 ==
| Designation | | | Discovery | | | Properties | | Ref |
| Permanent | Provisional | Named after | Date | Site | Discoverer(s) | Category | Diam. | Ref |
|---|---|---|---|---|---|---|---|---|
| 388001 | 2005 QH_{125} | — | August 28, 2005 | Kitt Peak | Spacewatch | · | 1.6 km | MPC · JPL |
| 388002 | 2005 QR_{135} | — | August 28, 2005 | Kitt Peak | Spacewatch | V | 560 m | MPC · JPL |
| 388003 | 2005 QL_{139} | — | August 28, 2005 | Kitt Peak | Spacewatch | · | 3.9 km | MPC · JPL |
| 388004 | 2005 QD_{140} | — | August 28, 2005 | Kitt Peak | Spacewatch | VER | 2.4 km | MPC · JPL |
| 388005 | 2005 QF_{148} | — | August 29, 2005 | Anderson Mesa | LONEOS | · | 970 m | MPC · JPL |
| 388006 | 2005 QL_{173} | — | August 29, 2005 | Palomar | NEAT | · | 930 m | MPC · JPL |
| 388007 | 2005 QT_{175} | — | August 31, 2005 | Palomar | NEAT | NYS | 1.1 km | MPC · JPL |
| 388008 | 2005 QB_{179} | — | August 25, 2005 | Palomar | NEAT | · | 3.0 km | MPC · JPL |
| 388009 | 2005 QC_{187} | — | August 29, 2005 | Kitt Peak | Spacewatch | · | 2.5 km | MPC · JPL |
| 388010 | 2005 QJ_{189} | — | August 25, 2005 | Palomar | NEAT | · | 2.8 km | MPC · JPL |
| 388011 | 2005 RR_{30} | — | September 11, 2005 | Kitt Peak | Spacewatch | MAS | 530 m | MPC · JPL |
| 388012 | 2005 RB_{35} | — | September 3, 2005 | Mauna Kea | Veillet, C. | · | 3.4 km | MPC · JPL |
| 388013 | 2005 RJ_{41} | — | September 13, 2005 | Kitt Peak | Spacewatch | · | 700 m | MPC · JPL |
| 388014 | 2005 RM_{48} | — | September 13, 2005 | Catalina | CSS | · | 1.2 km | MPC · JPL |
| 388015 | 2005 SB_{4} | — | September 24, 2005 | Kitt Peak | Spacewatch | · | 4.0 km | MPC · JPL |
| 388016 | 2005 SD_{11} | — | August 31, 2005 | Kitt Peak | Spacewatch | · | 1.1 km | MPC · JPL |
| 388017 | 2005 SA_{15} | — | September 26, 2005 | Kitt Peak | Spacewatch | PHO | 730 m | MPC · JPL |
| 388018 | 2005 SA_{26} | — | September 29, 2005 | Wrightwood | J. W. Young | PHO | 820 m | MPC · JPL |
| 388019 | 2005 SF_{29} | — | September 23, 2005 | Kitt Peak | Spacewatch | NYS | 870 m | MPC · JPL |
| 388020 | 2005 SU_{35} | — | September 23, 2005 | Kitt Peak | Spacewatch | · | 3.1 km | MPC · JPL |
| 388021 | 2005 ST_{40} | — | September 24, 2005 | Kitt Peak | Spacewatch | THM | 2.7 km | MPC · JPL |
| 388022 | 2005 SY_{40} | — | September 24, 2005 | Kitt Peak | Spacewatch | · | 940 m | MPC · JPL |
| 388023 | 2005 SU_{42} | — | September 24, 2005 | Kitt Peak | Spacewatch | · | 4.4 km | MPC · JPL |
| 388024 | 2005 ST_{46} | — | September 24, 2005 | Kitt Peak | Spacewatch | · | 830 m | MPC · JPL |
| 388025 | 2005 SP_{55} | — | September 25, 2005 | Kitt Peak | Spacewatch | · | 1.2 km | MPC · JPL |
| 388026 | 2005 SM_{66} | — | August 29, 2005 | Socorro | LINEAR | · | 980 m | MPC · JPL |
| 388027 | 2005 SF_{69} | — | September 27, 2005 | Kitt Peak | Spacewatch | · | 4.8 km | MPC · JPL |
| 388028 | 2005 SU_{82} | — | September 24, 2005 | Kitt Peak | Spacewatch | · | 670 m | MPC · JPL |
| 388029 | 2005 SH_{87} | — | September 24, 2005 | Kitt Peak | Spacewatch | · | 4.4 km | MPC · JPL |
| 388030 | 2005 SL_{94} | — | September 25, 2005 | Kitt Peak | Spacewatch | · | 2.1 km | MPC · JPL |
| 388031 | 2005 SG_{98} | — | September 25, 2005 | Kitt Peak | Spacewatch | · | 3.4 km | MPC · JPL |
| 388032 | 2005 ST_{107} | — | September 26, 2005 | Kitt Peak | Spacewatch | · | 880 m | MPC · JPL |
| 388033 | 2005 SW_{109} | — | September 26, 2005 | Kitt Peak | Spacewatch | · | 620 m | MPC · JPL |
| 388034 | 2005 SN_{124} | — | September 23, 2005 | Catalina | CSS | · | 720 m | MPC · JPL |
| 388035 | 2005 SL_{128} | — | September 29, 2005 | Mount Lemmon | Mount Lemmon Survey | · | 4.9 km | MPC · JPL |
| 388036 | 2005 SQ_{134} | — | September 30, 2005 | Junk Bond | D. Healy | · | 870 m | MPC · JPL |
| 388037 | 2005 SL_{144} | — | September 25, 2005 | Palomar | NEAT | MAS | 760 m | MPC · JPL |
| 388038 | 2005 SW_{145} | — | September 25, 2005 | Kitt Peak | Spacewatch | · | 910 m | MPC · JPL |
| 388039 | 2005 SE_{146} | — | September 25, 2005 | Palomar | NEAT | slow | 900 m | MPC · JPL |
| 388040 | 2005 SE_{162} | — | September 27, 2005 | Kitt Peak | Spacewatch | · | 760 m | MPC · JPL |
| 388041 | 2005 SU_{170} | — | September 29, 2005 | Kitt Peak | Spacewatch | · | 720 m | MPC · JPL |
| 388042 | 2005 SF_{193} | — | September 29, 2005 | Catalina | CSS | · | 1.5 km | MPC · JPL |
| 388043 | 2005 SP_{209} | — | September 30, 2005 | Palomar | NEAT | · | 1.1 km | MPC · JPL |
| 388044 | 2005 SO_{212} | — | September 30, 2005 | Mount Lemmon | Mount Lemmon Survey | · | 1.1 km | MPC · JPL |
| 388045 | 2005 SF_{218} | — | September 30, 2005 | Palomar | NEAT | · | 1.1 km | MPC · JPL |
| 388046 | 2005 ST_{231} | — | September 30, 2005 | Mount Lemmon | Mount Lemmon Survey | MAS | 530 m | MPC · JPL |
| 388047 | 2005 SO_{232} | — | September 30, 2005 | Mount Lemmon | Mount Lemmon Survey | · | 1.2 km | MPC · JPL |
| 388048 | 2005 SZ_{240} | — | September 30, 2005 | Kitt Peak | Spacewatch | · | 4.1 km | MPC · JPL |
| 388049 | 2005 SC_{267} | — | September 29, 2005 | Mount Lemmon | Mount Lemmon Survey | NYS | 980 m | MPC · JPL |
| 388050 | 2005 SR_{271} | — | September 26, 2005 | Kitt Peak | Spacewatch | · | 800 m | MPC · JPL |
| 388051 | 2005 SJ_{278} | — | September 24, 2005 | Kitt Peak | Spacewatch | · | 520 m | MPC · JPL |
| 388052 | 2005 SB_{279} | — | September 29, 2005 | Catalina | CSS | · | 1.2 km | MPC · JPL |
| 388053 | 2005 SN_{288} | — | September 27, 2005 | Apache Point | A. C. Becker | · | 4.5 km | MPC · JPL |
| 388054 | 2005 SO_{292} | — | September 30, 2005 | Mount Lemmon | Mount Lemmon Survey | · | 880 m | MPC · JPL |
| 388055 | 2005 TW_{10} | — | October 2, 2005 | Mount Lemmon | Mount Lemmon Survey | · | 5.1 km | MPC · JPL |
| 388056 | 2005 TL_{23} | — | October 1, 2005 | Anderson Mesa | LONEOS | · | 850 m | MPC · JPL |
| 388057 | 2005 TS_{49} | — | October 7, 2005 | Andrushivka | Andrushivka | · | 1.4 km | MPC · JPL |
| 388058 | 2005 TP_{53} | — | October 1, 2005 | Catalina | CSS | LIX | 4.5 km | MPC · JPL |
| 388059 | 2005 TA_{64} | — | October 6, 2005 | Catalina | CSS | PHO | 1.5 km | MPC · JPL |
| 388060 | 2005 TN_{67} | — | October 5, 2005 | Mount Lemmon | Mount Lemmon Survey | · | 1.4 km | MPC · JPL |
| 388061 | 2005 TW_{82} | — | October 3, 2005 | Socorro | LINEAR | · | 940 m | MPC · JPL |
| 388062 | 2005 TF_{87} | — | October 5, 2005 | Kitt Peak | Spacewatch | MAS | 680 m | MPC · JPL |
| 388063 | 2005 TL_{108} | — | October 7, 2005 | Kitt Peak | Spacewatch | · | 1.3 km | MPC · JPL |
| 388064 | 2005 TE_{138} | — | October 7, 2005 | Catalina | CSS | · | 1.3 km | MPC · JPL |
| 388065 | 2005 TQ_{141} | — | October 8, 2005 | Kitt Peak | Spacewatch | · | 870 m | MPC · JPL |
| 388066 | 2005 TF_{142} | — | September 29, 2005 | Kitt Peak | Spacewatch | V | 610 m | MPC · JPL |
| 388067 | 2005 TS_{167} | — | September 29, 2005 | Mount Lemmon | Mount Lemmon Survey | V | 580 m | MPC · JPL |
| 388068 | 2005 US_{14} | — | October 22, 2005 | Kitt Peak | Spacewatch | · | 750 m | MPC · JPL |
| 388069 | 2005 UP_{20} | — | October 14, 2005 | Anderson Mesa | LONEOS | · | 1.2 km | MPC · JPL |
| 388070 | 2005 UZ_{22} | — | October 23, 2005 | Kitt Peak | Spacewatch | · | 1.1 km | MPC · JPL |
| 388071 | 2005 US_{24} | — | October 23, 2005 | Kitt Peak | Spacewatch | · | 770 m | MPC · JPL |
| 388072 | 2005 UD_{29} | — | October 23, 2005 | Catalina | CSS | · | 1.2 km | MPC · JPL |
| 388073 | 2005 UH_{42} | — | October 22, 2005 | Kitt Peak | Spacewatch | · | 950 m | MPC · JPL |
| 388074 | 2005 UQ_{47} | — | October 22, 2005 | Catalina | CSS | fast | 1.3 km | MPC · JPL |
| 388075 | 2005 UX_{47} | — | October 22, 2005 | Catalina | CSS | NYS | 1.3 km | MPC · JPL |
| 388076 | 2005 UW_{51} | — | September 30, 2005 | Catalina | CSS | · | 1.4 km | MPC · JPL |
| 388077 | 2005 UU_{52} | — | October 23, 2005 | Catalina | CSS | · | 1.1 km | MPC · JPL |
| 388078 | 2005 UQ_{62} | — | October 25, 2005 | Mount Lemmon | Mount Lemmon Survey | · | 720 m | MPC · JPL |
| 388079 | 2005 UP_{68} | — | October 23, 2005 | Palomar | NEAT | · | 950 m | MPC · JPL |
| 388080 | 2005 US_{70} | — | October 23, 2005 | Catalina | CSS | · | 1.5 km | MPC · JPL |
| 388081 | 2005 UB_{71} | — | October 3, 2005 | Socorro | LINEAR | · | 1.6 km | MPC · JPL |
| 388082 | 2005 UZ_{85} | — | October 22, 2005 | Kitt Peak | Spacewatch | · | 1.0 km | MPC · JPL |
| 388083 | 2005 UR_{95} | — | October 22, 2005 | Kitt Peak | Spacewatch | MAS | 710 m | MPC · JPL |
| 388084 | 2005 UA_{108} | — | October 22, 2005 | Kitt Peak | Spacewatch | · | 3.5 km | MPC · JPL |
| 388085 | 2005 UA_{113} | — | October 22, 2005 | Kitt Peak | Spacewatch | · | 1.1 km | MPC · JPL |
| 388086 | 2005 UC_{113} | — | October 22, 2005 | Kitt Peak | Spacewatch | · | 1.2 km | MPC · JPL |
| 388087 | 2005 UA_{125} | — | October 24, 2005 | Kitt Peak | Spacewatch | · | 1.0 km | MPC · JPL |
| 388088 | 2005 UJ_{144} | — | October 26, 2005 | Kitt Peak | Spacewatch | V | 760 m | MPC · JPL |
| 388089 | 2005 UM_{207} | — | October 27, 2005 | Kitt Peak | Spacewatch | · | 1.0 km | MPC · JPL |
| 388090 | 2005 UQ_{215} | — | October 25, 2005 | Anderson Mesa | LONEOS | NYS | 1.3 km | MPC · JPL |
| 388091 | 2005 UZ_{216} | — | October 26, 2005 | Kitt Peak | Spacewatch | · | 1.4 km | MPC · JPL |
| 388092 | 2005 UE_{217} | — | October 27, 2005 | Socorro | LINEAR | · | 1.4 km | MPC · JPL |
| 388093 | 2005 UY_{222} | — | October 25, 2005 | Kitt Peak | Spacewatch | · | 1.2 km | MPC · JPL |
| 388094 | 2005 UK_{252} | — | October 26, 2005 | Kitt Peak | Spacewatch | V | 700 m | MPC · JPL |
| 388095 | 2005 UB_{262} | — | October 26, 2005 | Kitt Peak | Spacewatch | NYS | 1.0 km | MPC · JPL |
| 388096 | 2005 UJ_{268} | — | October 28, 2005 | Mount Lemmon | Mount Lemmon Survey | V | 790 m | MPC · JPL |
| 388097 | 2005 UB_{285} | — | October 26, 2005 | Kitt Peak | Spacewatch | · | 1.1 km | MPC · JPL |
| 388098 | 2005 UV_{286} | — | October 26, 2005 | Kitt Peak | Spacewatch | · | 860 m | MPC · JPL |
| 388099 | 2005 UD_{298} | — | October 26, 2005 | Kitt Peak | Spacewatch | · | 1.3 km | MPC · JPL |
| 388100 | 2005 UF_{299} | — | October 26, 2005 | Kitt Peak | Spacewatch | · | 880 m | MPC · JPL |

== 388101–388200 ==
back to top

| Designation | | | Discovery | | | Properties | | Ref |
| Permanent | Provisional | Named after | Date | Site | Discoverer(s) | Category | Diam. | Ref |
|---|---|---|---|---|---|---|---|---|
| 388101 | 2005 UX_{301} | — | October 26, 2005 | Kitt Peak | Spacewatch | · | 3.7 km | MPC · JPL |
| 388102 | 2005 UN_{303} | — | October 26, 2005 | Kitt Peak | Spacewatch | · | 1.7 km | MPC · JPL |
| 388103 | 2005 UL_{305} | — | October 27, 2005 | Kitt Peak | Spacewatch | NYS | 1.1 km | MPC · JPL |
| 388104 | 2005 UV_{327} | — | October 29, 2005 | Catalina | CSS | · | 1.2 km | MPC · JPL |
| 388105 | 2005 UH_{339} | — | October 31, 2005 | Kitt Peak | Spacewatch | ERI | 2.3 km | MPC · JPL |
| 388106 | 2005 UO_{341} | — | October 31, 2005 | Kitt Peak | Spacewatch | · | 880 m | MPC · JPL |
| 388107 | 2005 UO_{348} | — | October 23, 2005 | Catalina | CSS | · | 1.1 km | MPC · JPL |
| 388108 | 2005 UP_{348} | — | October 23, 2005 | Catalina | CSS | · | 1.4 km | MPC · JPL |
| 388109 | 2005 UG_{370} | — | October 27, 2005 | Kitt Peak | Spacewatch | · | 1.2 km | MPC · JPL |
| 388110 | 2005 US_{371} | — | October 27, 2005 | Mount Lemmon | Mount Lemmon Survey | MAS | 710 m | MPC · JPL |
| 388111 | 2005 UO_{396} | — | October 27, 2005 | Socorro | LINEAR | · | 1.9 km | MPC · JPL |
| 388112 | 2005 UF_{402} | — | October 28, 2005 | Kitt Peak | Spacewatch | · | 1.3 km | MPC · JPL |
| 388113 | 2005 UP_{402} | — | October 28, 2005 | Catalina | CSS | NYS · fast | 1.2 km | MPC · JPL |
| 388114 | 2005 UW_{411} | — | October 31, 2005 | Mount Lemmon | Mount Lemmon Survey | · | 1.1 km | MPC · JPL |
| 388115 | 2005 UV_{418} | — | October 25, 2005 | Kitt Peak | Spacewatch | V | 750 m | MPC · JPL |
| 388116 | 2005 UD_{426} | — | October 28, 2005 | Kitt Peak | Spacewatch | V | 770 m | MPC · JPL |
| 388117 | 2005 UH_{431} | — | October 28, 2005 | Kitt Peak | Spacewatch | · | 1.2 km | MPC · JPL |
| 388118 | 2005 UK_{438} | — | October 28, 2005 | Kitt Peak | Spacewatch | NYS | 950 m | MPC · JPL |
| 388119 | 2005 UK_{443} | — | October 30, 2005 | Socorro | LINEAR | V | 760 m | MPC · JPL |
| 388120 | 2005 US_{457} | — | October 29, 2005 | Kitt Peak | Spacewatch | · | 860 m | MPC · JPL |
| 388121 | 2005 UT_{463} | — | October 30, 2005 | Kitt Peak | Spacewatch | MAS | 640 m | MPC · JPL |
| 388122 | 2005 UA_{467} | — | October 30, 2005 | Kitt Peak | Spacewatch | · | 800 m | MPC · JPL |
| 388123 | 2005 UJ_{476} | — | October 24, 2005 | Anderson Mesa | LONEOS | NYS | 960 m | MPC · JPL |
| 388124 | 2005 UP_{477} | — | October 26, 2005 | Kitt Peak | Spacewatch | V | 730 m | MPC · JPL |
| 388125 | 2005 UP_{482} | — | October 22, 2005 | Palomar | NEAT | · | 890 m | MPC · JPL |
| 388126 | 2005 UQ_{510} | — | October 25, 2005 | Mount Lemmon | Mount Lemmon Survey | CYB | 5.1 km | MPC · JPL |
| 388127 | 2005 UP_{522} | — | October 27, 2005 | Apache Point | A. C. Becker | HYG | 3.2 km | MPC · JPL |
| 388128 | 2005 VE_{8} | — | November 1, 2005 | Kitt Peak | Spacewatch | · | 740 m | MPC · JPL |
| 388129 | 2005 VZ_{33} | — | November 2, 2005 | Mount Lemmon | Mount Lemmon Survey | NYS | 1.4 km | MPC · JPL |
| 388130 | 2005 VN_{82} | — | November 3, 2005 | Kitt Peak | Spacewatch | · | 990 m | MPC · JPL |
| 388131 | 2005 VW_{108} | — | October 25, 2005 | Kitt Peak | Spacewatch | · | 1.1 km | MPC · JPL |
| 388132 | 2005 VC_{112} | — | November 6, 2005 | Mount Lemmon | Mount Lemmon Survey | NYS | 1.2 km | MPC · JPL |
| 388133 | 2005 VV_{112} | — | September 30, 2005 | Mount Lemmon | Mount Lemmon Survey | · | 1.1 km | MPC · JPL |
| 388134 | 2005 VS_{113} | — | November 10, 2005 | Kitt Peak | Spacewatch | · | 1.1 km | MPC · JPL |
| 388135 | 2005 VG_{129} | — | November 1, 2005 | Apache Point | A. C. Becker | · | 3.3 km | MPC · JPL |
| 388136 | 2005 WW_{4} | — | November 19, 2005 | Palomar | NEAT | · | 1.1 km | MPC · JPL |
| 388137 | 2005 WC_{7} | — | November 21, 2005 | Catalina | CSS | NYS | 1.1 km | MPC · JPL |
| 388138 | 2005 WT_{25} | — | November 21, 2005 | Kitt Peak | Spacewatch | · | 1.0 km | MPC · JPL |
| 388139 | 2005 WY_{29} | — | November 6, 2005 | Mount Lemmon | Mount Lemmon Survey | NYS | 1.0 km | MPC · JPL |
| 388140 | 2005 WO_{31} | — | November 21, 2005 | Kitt Peak | Spacewatch | MAS | 650 m | MPC · JPL |
| 388141 | 2005 WQ_{31} | — | November 21, 2005 | Kitt Peak | Spacewatch | · | 990 m | MPC · JPL |
| 388142 | 2005 WR_{46} | — | November 25, 2005 | Kitt Peak | Spacewatch | MAS | 730 m | MPC · JPL |
| 388143 | 2005 WF_{66} | — | November 22, 2005 | Kitt Peak | Spacewatch | MAS | 650 m | MPC · JPL |
| 388144 | 2005 WQ_{106} | — | April 7, 2003 | Kitt Peak | Spacewatch | · | 4.0 km | MPC · JPL |
| 388145 | 2005 WZ_{119} | — | November 6, 2005 | Mount Lemmon | Mount Lemmon Survey | · | 970 m | MPC · JPL |
| 388146 | 2005 WS_{137} | — | November 26, 2005 | Mount Lemmon | Mount Lemmon Survey | · | 1.2 km | MPC · JPL |
| 388147 | 2005 WF_{155} | — | November 29, 2005 | Kitt Peak | Spacewatch | · | 1.1 km | MPC · JPL |
| 388148 | 2005 WP_{159} | — | November 30, 2005 | Kitt Peak | Spacewatch | CYB | 3.0 km | MPC · JPL |
| 388149 | 2005 WZ_{195} | — | November 26, 2005 | Mount Lemmon | Mount Lemmon Survey | · | 1.7 km | MPC · JPL |
| 388150 | 2005 WU_{197} | — | October 28, 2005 | Mount Lemmon | Mount Lemmon Survey | · | 2.9 km | MPC · JPL |
| 388151 | 2005 WZ_{210} | — | November 25, 2005 | Mount Lemmon | Mount Lemmon Survey | · | 1.1 km | MPC · JPL |
| 388152 | 2005 XB_{38} | — | December 4, 2005 | Kitt Peak | Spacewatch | V | 730 m | MPC · JPL |
| 388153 | 2005 XX_{50} | — | December 2, 2005 | Kitt Peak | Spacewatch | · | 1.5 km | MPC · JPL |
| 388154 | 2005 YZ_{9} | — | December 21, 2005 | Kitt Peak | Spacewatch | · | 1.4 km | MPC · JPL |
| 388155 | 2005 YX_{13} | — | December 22, 2005 | Kitt Peak | Spacewatch | · | 1.1 km | MPC · JPL |
| 388156 | 2005 YR_{18} | — | December 23, 2005 | Kitt Peak | Spacewatch | · | 1.3 km | MPC · JPL |
| 388157 | 2005 YD_{59} | — | December 25, 2005 | Kitt Peak | Spacewatch | · | 1.4 km | MPC · JPL |
| 388158 | 2005 YK_{66} | — | December 25, 2005 | Kitt Peak | Spacewatch | · | 1.3 km | MPC · JPL |
| 388159 | 2005 YV_{70} | — | December 27, 2005 | Catalina | CSS | · | 1.9 km | MPC · JPL |
| 388160 | 2005 YH_{132} | — | December 25, 2005 | Mount Lemmon | Mount Lemmon Survey | MAS | 680 m | MPC · JPL |
| 388161 | 2005 YQ_{133} | — | December 26, 2005 | Kitt Peak | Spacewatch | NYS | 1.1 km | MPC · JPL |
| 388162 | 2005 YM_{137} | — | December 26, 2005 | Kitt Peak | Spacewatch | NYS | 910 m | MPC · JPL |
| 388163 | 2005 YZ_{179} | — | December 28, 2005 | Mount Lemmon | Mount Lemmon Survey | · | 1.1 km | MPC · JPL |
| 388164 | 2005 YH_{231} | — | December 27, 2005 | Mount Lemmon | Mount Lemmon Survey | MAS | 710 m | MPC · JPL |
| 388165 | 2005 YO_{239} | — | December 29, 2005 | Kitt Peak | Spacewatch | MAS | 700 m | MPC · JPL |
| 388166 | 2006 AN_{28} | — | January 6, 2006 | Kitt Peak | Spacewatch | · | 1.4 km | MPC · JPL |
| 388167 | 2006 AN_{37} | — | January 4, 2006 | Kitt Peak | Spacewatch | · | 1.8 km | MPC · JPL |
| 388168 | 2006 AN_{46} | — | January 5, 2006 | Kitt Peak | Spacewatch | · | 1.3 km | MPC · JPL |
| 388169 | 2006 AF_{62} | — | January 5, 2006 | Kitt Peak | Spacewatch | fast? | 1.4 km | MPC · JPL |
| 388170 | 2006 AP_{87} | — | January 4, 2006 | Kitt Peak | Spacewatch | · | 1.3 km | MPC · JPL |
| 388171 | 2006 AT_{93} | — | January 7, 2006 | Mount Lemmon | Mount Lemmon Survey | · | 1.3 km | MPC · JPL |
| 388172 | 2006 BW_{37} | — | January 23, 2006 | Mount Lemmon | Mount Lemmon Survey | MAS | 720 m | MPC · JPL |
| 388173 | 2006 BM_{99} | — | January 28, 2006 | Catalina | CSS | H | 680 m | MPC · JPL |
| 388174 | 2006 BQ_{108} | — | January 25, 2006 | Kitt Peak | Spacewatch | · | 990 m | MPC · JPL |
| 388175 | 2006 BM_{109} | — | March 31, 2003 | Kitt Peak | Spacewatch | · | 1.2 km | MPC · JPL |
| 388176 | 2006 BH_{127} | — | January 8, 2006 | Mount Lemmon | Mount Lemmon Survey | · | 1.2 km | MPC · JPL |
| 388177 | 2006 BM_{130} | — | January 26, 2006 | Mount Lemmon | Mount Lemmon Survey | · | 1.5 km | MPC · JPL |
| 388178 | 2006 BY_{137} | — | January 28, 2006 | Mount Lemmon | Mount Lemmon Survey | (5) | 1.1 km | MPC · JPL |
| 388179 | 2006 BK_{147} | — | January 31, 2006 | Junk Bond | D. Healy | MAS | 880 m | MPC · JPL |
| 388180 | 2006 BG_{155} | — | January 25, 2006 | Kitt Peak | Spacewatch | · | 1.7 km | MPC · JPL |
| 388181 | 2006 BS_{167} | — | January 26, 2006 | Mount Lemmon | Mount Lemmon Survey | · | 880 m | MPC · JPL |
| 388182 | 2006 BB_{203} | — | January 31, 2006 | Kitt Peak | Spacewatch | · | 1.3 km | MPC · JPL |
| 388183 | 2006 BS_{232} | — | May 25, 2003 | Kitt Peak | Spacewatch | CLA | 2.6 km | MPC · JPL |
| 388184 | 2006 BY_{271} | — | January 31, 2006 | Siding Spring | SSS | H | 700 m | MPC · JPL |
| 388185 | 2006 CX_{10} | — | February 7, 2006 | Socorro | LINEAR | AMO +1km | 2.8 km | MPC · JPL |
| 388186 | 2006 CM_{16} | — | February 1, 2006 | Mount Lemmon | Mount Lemmon Survey | · | 1.1 km | MPC · JPL |
| 388187 | 2006 DN_{11} | — | February 21, 2006 | Catalina | CSS | · | 2.0 km | MPC · JPL |
| 388188 | 2006 DP_{14} | — | February 23, 2006 | Socorro | LINEAR | APO · PHA | 560 m | MPC · JPL |
| 388189 | 2006 DS_{14} | — | February 24, 2006 | Catalina | CSS | ATE | 320 m | MPC · JPL |
| 388190 | 2006 DK_{22} | — | February 20, 2006 | Kitt Peak | Spacewatch | · | 880 m | MPC · JPL |
| 388191 | 2006 DW_{29} | — | January 10, 2006 | Mount Lemmon | Mount Lemmon Survey | · | 2.0 km | MPC · JPL |
| 388192 | 2006 DW_{45} | — | February 20, 2006 | Kitt Peak | Spacewatch | · | 2.3 km | MPC · JPL |
| 388193 | 2006 DM_{46} | — | February 20, 2006 | Kitt Peak | Spacewatch | · | 1.6 km | MPC · JPL |
| 388194 | 2006 DH_{93} | — | February 24, 2006 | Kitt Peak | Spacewatch | · | 890 m | MPC · JPL |
| 388195 | 2006 DD_{94} | — | February 24, 2006 | Kitt Peak | Spacewatch | · | 1.1 km | MPC · JPL |
| 388196 | 2006 DX_{105} | — | February 25, 2006 | Mount Lemmon | Mount Lemmon Survey | · | 1.1 km | MPC · JPL |
| 388197 | 2006 DX_{133} | — | January 31, 2006 | Kitt Peak | Spacewatch | · | 1.9 km | MPC · JPL |
| 388198 | 2006 DR_{139} | — | February 25, 2006 | Kitt Peak | Spacewatch | · | 1.3 km | MPC · JPL |
| 388199 | 2006 DZ_{166} | — | February 27, 2006 | Kitt Peak | Spacewatch | · | 1.2 km | MPC · JPL |
| 388200 | 2006 DL_{168} | — | April 11, 2002 | Socorro | LINEAR | · | 1.6 km | MPC · JPL |

== 388201–388300 ==
back to top

| Designation | | | Discovery | | | Properties | | Ref |
| Permanent | Provisional | Named after | Date | Site | Discoverer(s) | Category | Diam. | Ref |
|---|---|---|---|---|---|---|---|---|
| 388201 | 2006 DL_{193} | — | February 27, 2006 | Kitt Peak | Spacewatch | EUN | 1.5 km | MPC · JPL |
| 388202 | 2006 DW_{211} | — | February 24, 2006 | Mount Lemmon | Mount Lemmon Survey | MAR | 1.2 km | MPC · JPL |
| 388203 | 2006 DJ_{216} | — | February 25, 2006 | Kitt Peak | Spacewatch | · | 1.0 km | MPC · JPL |
| 388204 | 2006 EY_{29} | — | March 3, 2006 | Kitt Peak | Spacewatch | · | 1.1 km | MPC · JPL |
| 388205 | 2006 EQ_{36} | — | March 3, 2006 | Mount Lemmon | Mount Lemmon Survey | H | 560 m | MPC · JPL |
| 388206 | 2006 EY_{74} | — | March 2, 2006 | Mount Lemmon | Mount Lemmon Survey | · | 970 m | MPC · JPL |
| 388207 | 2006 FN_{33} | — | March 25, 2006 | Mount Lemmon | Mount Lemmon Survey | · | 1.4 km | MPC · JPL |
| 388208 | 2006 FB_{41} | — | March 26, 2006 | Mount Lemmon | Mount Lemmon Survey | · | 1.9 km | MPC · JPL |
| 388209 | 2006 FG_{45} | — | March 24, 2006 | Socorro | LINEAR | · | 1.6 km | MPC · JPL |
| 388210 | 2006 GV_{19} | — | April 2, 2006 | Kitt Peak | Spacewatch | EUN | 1.1 km | MPC · JPL |
| 388211 | 2006 GZ_{32} | — | April 7, 2006 | Kitt Peak | Spacewatch | · | 1.2 km | MPC · JPL |
| 388212 | 2006 GE_{45} | — | April 7, 2006 | Kitt Peak | Spacewatch | · | 1.8 km | MPC · JPL |
| 388213 | 2006 GY_{53} | — | April 2, 2006 | Kitt Peak | Spacewatch | · | 1.8 km | MPC · JPL |
| 388214 | 2006 HW_{17} | — | April 20, 2006 | Kitt Peak | Spacewatch | · | 2.3 km | MPC · JPL |
| 388215 | 2006 HV_{34} | — | April 19, 2006 | Mount Lemmon | Mount Lemmon Survey | · | 1.8 km | MPC · JPL |
| 388216 | 2006 HC_{41} | — | April 21, 2006 | Kitt Peak | Spacewatch | ADE | 2.3 km | MPC · JPL |
| 388217 | 2006 HX_{42} | — | April 24, 2006 | Socorro | LINEAR | · | 2.4 km | MPC · JPL |
| 388218 | 2006 HT_{70} | — | April 25, 2006 | Kitt Peak | Spacewatch | · | 1.6 km | MPC · JPL |
| 388219 | 2006 HD_{79} | — | April 26, 2006 | Kitt Peak | Spacewatch | · | 1.4 km | MPC · JPL |
| 388220 | 2006 HX_{92} | — | April 29, 2006 | Kitt Peak | Spacewatch | · | 1.5 km | MPC · JPL |
| 388221 | 2006 HJ_{103} | — | April 30, 2006 | Kitt Peak | Spacewatch | EUN | 1.1 km | MPC · JPL |
| 388222 | 2006 HM_{104} | — | April 30, 2006 | Kitt Peak | Spacewatch | · | 2.0 km | MPC · JPL |
| 388223 | 2006 JC_{1} | — | May 3, 2006 | Bergisch Gladbach | W. Bickel | · | 1.9 km | MPC · JPL |
| 388224 | 2006 JE_{12} | — | May 1, 2006 | Kitt Peak | Spacewatch | · | 2.0 km | MPC · JPL |
| 388225 | 2006 JA_{18} | — | May 2, 2006 | Mount Lemmon | Mount Lemmon Survey | · | 3.1 km | MPC · JPL |
| 388226 | 2006 JT_{26} | — | May 5, 2006 | Reedy Creek | J. Broughton | · | 1.7 km | MPC · JPL |
| 388227 | 2006 JG_{47} | — | May 14, 2006 | Palomar | NEAT | KRM | 3.1 km | MPC · JPL |
| 388228 | 2006 JM_{54} | — | May 8, 2006 | Mount Lemmon | Mount Lemmon Survey | · | 2.8 km | MPC · JPL |
| 388229 | 2006 JC_{81} | — | May 1, 2006 | Catalina | CSS | EUN | 1.5 km | MPC · JPL |
| 388230 | 2006 KT_{12} | — | May 20, 2006 | Kitt Peak | Spacewatch | · | 1.3 km | MPC · JPL |
| 388231 | 2006 KC_{14} | — | May 20, 2006 | Palomar | NEAT | · | 2.7 km | MPC · JPL |
| 388232 | 2006 KK_{17} | — | April 24, 2006 | Kitt Peak | Spacewatch | · | 1.7 km | MPC · JPL |
| 388233 | 2006 KT_{17} | — | May 21, 2006 | Kitt Peak | Spacewatch | MAR | 1.3 km | MPC · JPL |
| 388234 | 2006 KV_{17} | — | May 21, 2006 | Kitt Peak | Spacewatch | · | 2.5 km | MPC · JPL |
| 388235 | 2006 KW_{17} | — | May 21, 2006 | Kitt Peak | Spacewatch | · | 1.8 km | MPC · JPL |
| 388236 | 2006 KZ_{18} | — | May 21, 2006 | Kitt Peak | Spacewatch | · | 2.2 km | MPC · JPL |
| 388237 | 2006 KP_{22} | — | May 20, 2006 | Catalina | CSS | · | 2.3 km | MPC · JPL |
| 388238 | 2006 KH_{26} | — | May 20, 2006 | Kitt Peak | Spacewatch | · | 2.2 km | MPC · JPL |
| 388239 | 2006 KB_{29} | — | May 20, 2006 | Kitt Peak | Spacewatch | · | 1.5 km | MPC · JPL |
| 388240 | 2006 KE_{29} | — | May 20, 2006 | Kitt Peak | Spacewatch | · | 2.3 km | MPC · JPL |
| 388241 | 2006 KN_{33} | — | May 20, 2006 | Kitt Peak | Spacewatch | · | 2.6 km | MPC · JPL |
| 388242 | 2006 KS_{39} | — | May 21, 2006 | Anderson Mesa | LONEOS | · | 1.4 km | MPC · JPL |
| 388243 | 2006 KU_{42} | — | May 20, 2006 | Kitt Peak | Spacewatch | · | 1.6 km | MPC · JPL |
| 388244 | 2006 KP_{44} | — | May 21, 2006 | Kitt Peak | Spacewatch | · | 2.4 km | MPC · JPL |
| 388245 | 2006 KR_{55} | — | May 21, 2006 | Kitt Peak | Spacewatch | · | 1.4 km | MPC · JPL |
| 388246 | 2006 KH_{56} | — | May 22, 2006 | Kitt Peak | Spacewatch | · | 3.1 km | MPC · JPL |
| 388247 | 2006 KP_{57} | — | November 24, 2003 | Kitt Peak | Spacewatch | · | 2.4 km | MPC · JPL |
| 388248 | 2006 KD_{74} | — | May 23, 2006 | Kitt Peak | Spacewatch | · | 2.6 km | MPC · JPL |
| 388249 | 2006 KR_{88} | — | May 24, 2006 | Kitt Peak | Spacewatch | · | 1.5 km | MPC · JPL |
| 388250 | 2006 KC_{90} | — | May 23, 2006 | Kitt Peak | Spacewatch | · | 2.6 km | MPC · JPL |
| 388251 | 2006 KJ_{117} | — | May 29, 2006 | Kitt Peak | Spacewatch | ADE | 1.9 km | MPC · JPL |
| 388252 | 2006 MQ_{1} | — | June 18, 2006 | Kitt Peak | Spacewatch | · | 2.2 km | MPC · JPL |
| 388253 | 2006 MJ_{14} | — | June 18, 2006 | Siding Spring | SSS | · | 2.0 km | MPC · JPL |
| 388254 | 2006 OF_{12} | — | July 21, 2006 | Palomar | NEAT | · | 1.9 km | MPC · JPL |
| 388255 | 2006 OO_{16} | — | July 20, 2006 | Palomar | NEAT | · | 2.0 km | MPC · JPL |
| 388256 | 2006 OL_{21} | — | July 25, 2006 | Mount Lemmon | Mount Lemmon Survey | · | 2.8 km | MPC · JPL |
| 388257 | 2006 PR_{26} | — | August 15, 2006 | Palomar | NEAT | · | 2.1 km | MPC · JPL |
| 388258 | 2006 PG_{31} | — | August 13, 2006 | Palomar | NEAT | · | 1.9 km | MPC · JPL |
| 388259 | 2006 QF_{1} | — | August 17, 2006 | Palomar | NEAT | · | 630 m | MPC · JPL |
| 388260 | 2006 QQ_{3} | — | August 18, 2006 | Socorro | LINEAR | · | 2.6 km | MPC · JPL |
| 388261 | 2006 QA_{16} | — | August 17, 2006 | Palomar | NEAT | · | 3.3 km | MPC · JPL |
| 388262 | 2006 QS_{48} | — | August 21, 2006 | Socorro | LINEAR | · | 4.1 km | MPC · JPL |
| 388263 | 2006 QG_{49} | — | August 21, 2006 | Palomar | NEAT | TIR | 3.4 km | MPC · JPL |
| 388264 | 2006 QV_{58} | — | August 19, 2006 | Anderson Mesa | LONEOS | · | 2.2 km | MPC · JPL |
| 388265 | 2006 QD_{80} | — | August 24, 2006 | Socorro | LINEAR | LIX | 3.7 km | MPC · JPL |
| 388266 | 2006 QZ_{95} | — | August 16, 2006 | Palomar | NEAT | T_{j} (2.98) | 4.0 km | MPC · JPL |
| 388267 | 2006 QP_{98} | — | August 22, 2006 | Palomar | NEAT | · | 870 m | MPC · JPL |
| 388268 | 2006 QR_{106} | — | August 28, 2006 | Catalina | CSS | TIR | 3.1 km | MPC · JPL |
| 388269 | 2006 QF_{120} | — | August 29, 2006 | Catalina | CSS | (1547) | 1.6 km | MPC · JPL |
| 388270 | 2006 QE_{185} | — | August 28, 2006 | Kitt Peak | Spacewatch | · | 1.9 km | MPC · JPL |
| 388271 | 2006 RD_{17} | — | September 14, 2006 | Catalina | CSS | · | 3.2 km | MPC · JPL |
| 388272 | 2006 RW_{39} | — | September 12, 2006 | Catalina | CSS | · | 2.9 km | MPC · JPL |
| 388273 | 2006 RZ_{42} | — | September 14, 2006 | Kitt Peak | Spacewatch | · | 2.5 km | MPC · JPL |
| 388274 | 2006 RV_{59} | — | September 15, 2006 | Kitt Peak | Spacewatch | · | 3.0 km | MPC · JPL |
| 388275 | 2006 RS_{70} | — | September 15, 2006 | Kitt Peak | Spacewatch | KOR | 1.5 km | MPC · JPL |
| 388276 | 2006 RT_{70} | — | September 15, 2006 | Kitt Peak | Spacewatch | · | 2.5 km | MPC · JPL |
| 388277 | 2006 RE_{88} | — | September 15, 2006 | Kitt Peak | Spacewatch | · | 1.3 km | MPC · JPL |
| 388278 | 2006 RX_{88} | — | September 15, 2006 | Kitt Peak | Spacewatch | · | 3.1 km | MPC · JPL |
| 388279 | 2006 RC_{89} | — | September 15, 2006 | Kitt Peak | Spacewatch | · | 2.8 km | MPC · JPL |
| 388280 | 2006 RQ_{100} | — | September 14, 2006 | Catalina | CSS | · | 3.1 km | MPC · JPL |
| 388281 | 2006 RW_{103} | — | September 11, 2006 | Apache Point | A. C. Becker | · | 2.0 km | MPC · JPL |
| 388282 ʻAkepa | 2006 RC_{118} | ʻAkepa | September 14, 2006 | Mauna Kea | Masiero, J. | · | 1.8 km | MPC · JPL |
| 388283 | 2006 RJ_{121} | — | September 15, 2006 | Kitt Peak | Spacewatch | EOS | 2.3 km | MPC · JPL |
| 388284 | 2006 SY_{12} | — | September 17, 2006 | Kitt Peak | Spacewatch | · | 2.0 km | MPC · JPL |
| 388285 | 2006 SQ_{22} | — | September 17, 2006 | Anderson Mesa | LONEOS | · | 3.2 km | MPC · JPL |
| 388286 | 2006 SW_{57} | — | September 17, 2006 | Kitt Peak | Spacewatch | · | 1.9 km | MPC · JPL |
| 388287 | 2006 SQ_{60} | — | September 18, 2006 | Catalina | CSS | · | 780 m | MPC · JPL |
| 388288 | 2006 SC_{67} | — | September 19, 2006 | Kitt Peak | Spacewatch | EOS | 1.6 km | MPC · JPL |
| 388289 | 2006 SN_{77} | — | September 20, 2006 | Calvin-Rehoboth | L. A. Molnar | VER | 2.7 km | MPC · JPL |
| 388290 | 2006 SJ_{79} | — | September 17, 2006 | Kitt Peak | Spacewatch | · | 3.0 km | MPC · JPL |
| 388291 | 2006 SF_{81} | — | September 18, 2006 | Kitt Peak | Spacewatch | · | 1.9 km | MPC · JPL |
| 388292 | 2006 SO_{81} | — | September 18, 2006 | Kitt Peak | Spacewatch | · | 3.0 km | MPC · JPL |
| 388293 | 2006 ST_{99} | — | September 18, 2006 | Kitt Peak | Spacewatch | VER | 2.6 km | MPC · JPL |
| 388294 | 2006 SC_{102} | — | September 19, 2006 | Kitt Peak | Spacewatch | KOR | 1.5 km | MPC · JPL |
| 388295 | 2006 ST_{114} | — | September 23, 2006 | Kitt Peak | Spacewatch | · | 2.6 km | MPC · JPL |
| 388296 | 2006 SZ_{118} | — | September 16, 2006 | Catalina | CSS | EUP | 4.3 km | MPC · JPL |
| 388297 | 2006 SL_{125} | — | September 20, 2006 | Catalina | CSS | · | 720 m | MPC · JPL |
| 388298 | 2006 SW_{140} | — | September 24, 2006 | Anderson Mesa | LONEOS | · | 2.9 km | MPC · JPL |
| 388299 | 2006 SK_{145} | — | September 19, 2006 | Kitt Peak | Spacewatch | · | 2.0 km | MPC · JPL |
| 388300 | 2006 SL_{146} | — | September 19, 2006 | Kitt Peak | Spacewatch | · | 2.4 km | MPC · JPL |

== 388301–388400 ==
back to top

| Designation | | | Discovery | | | Properties | | Ref |
| Permanent | Provisional | Named after | Date | Site | Discoverer(s) | Category | Diam. | Ref |
|---|---|---|---|---|---|---|---|---|
| 388301 | 2006 SG_{147} | — | September 19, 2006 | Kitt Peak | Spacewatch | · | 2.3 km | MPC · JPL |
| 388302 | 2006 SG_{158} | — | September 23, 2006 | Kitt Peak | Spacewatch | · | 2.3 km | MPC · JPL |
| 388303 | 2006 SQ_{164} | — | September 25, 2006 | Kitt Peak | Spacewatch | · | 3.3 km | MPC · JPL |
| 388304 | 2006 SK_{201} | — | September 24, 2006 | Kitt Peak | Spacewatch | · | 2.4 km | MPC · JPL |
| 388305 | 2006 SL_{233} | — | September 26, 2006 | Kitt Peak | Spacewatch | EOS | 2.3 km | MPC · JPL |
| 388306 | 2006 SR_{234} | — | September 26, 2006 | Kitt Peak | Spacewatch | · | 790 m | MPC · JPL |
| 388307 | 2006 SX_{236} | — | September 26, 2006 | Mount Lemmon | Mount Lemmon Survey | · | 2.9 km | MPC · JPL |
| 388308 | 2006 SN_{245} | — | September 26, 2006 | Kitt Peak | Spacewatch | KOR | 1.4 km | MPC · JPL |
| 388309 | 2006 SU_{258} | — | September 26, 2006 | Kitt Peak | Spacewatch | · | 2.4 km | MPC · JPL |
| 388310 | 2006 SR_{286} | — | September 21, 2006 | Anderson Mesa | LONEOS | · | 3.4 km | MPC · JPL |
| 388311 | 2006 SQ_{297} | — | September 25, 2006 | Mount Lemmon | Mount Lemmon Survey | · | 2.6 km | MPC · JPL |
| 388312 | 2006 SC_{313} | — | September 27, 2006 | Kitt Peak | Spacewatch | · | 2.1 km | MPC · JPL |
| 388313 | 2006 SO_{322} | — | September 27, 2006 | Kitt Peak | Spacewatch | EOS | 2.0 km | MPC · JPL |
| 388314 | 2006 SQ_{323} | — | September 27, 2006 | Kitt Peak | Spacewatch | · | 1.7 km | MPC · JPL |
| 388315 | 2006 SS_{323} | — | September 17, 2006 | Kitt Peak | Spacewatch | · | 2.9 km | MPC · JPL |
| 388316 | 2006 SY_{326} | — | September 27, 2006 | Kitt Peak | Spacewatch | · | 1.7 km | MPC · JPL |
| 388317 | 2006 SU_{331} | — | September 28, 2006 | Mount Lemmon | Mount Lemmon Survey | · | 690 m | MPC · JPL |
| 388318 | 2006 SD_{332} | — | September 28, 2006 | Mount Lemmon | Mount Lemmon Survey | · | 3.1 km | MPC · JPL |
| 388319 | 2006 SJ_{335} | — | September 28, 2006 | Kitt Peak | Spacewatch | · | 2.2 km | MPC · JPL |
| 388320 | 2006 SJ_{336} | — | September 28, 2006 | Kitt Peak | Spacewatch | · | 2.7 km | MPC · JPL |
| 388321 | 2006 SB_{338} | — | September 28, 2006 | Kitt Peak | Spacewatch | · | 2.2 km | MPC · JPL |
| 388322 | 2006 SV_{344} | — | September 28, 2006 | Kitt Peak | Spacewatch | · | 1.9 km | MPC · JPL |
| 388323 | 2006 SA_{346} | — | September 28, 2006 | Kitt Peak | Spacewatch | EOS | 2.0 km | MPC · JPL |
| 388324 | 2006 SL_{348} | — | September 28, 2006 | Kitt Peak | Spacewatch | · | 2.3 km | MPC · JPL |
| 388325 | 2006 SH_{356} | — | September 30, 2006 | Catalina | CSS | · | 710 m | MPC · JPL |
| 388326 | 2006 SG_{362} | — | September 30, 2006 | Mount Lemmon | Mount Lemmon Survey | · | 3.0 km | MPC · JPL |
| 388327 | 2006 SS_{362} | — | September 30, 2006 | Mount Lemmon | Mount Lemmon Survey | · | 4.4 km | MPC · JPL |
| 388328 | 2006 SE_{375} | — | September 17, 2006 | Apache Point | A. C. Becker | · | 1.8 km | MPC · JPL |
| 388329 | 2006 SO_{379} | — | September 20, 2006 | Apache Point | A. C. Becker | EOS | 1.8 km | MPC · JPL |
| 388330 | 2006 SR_{381} | — | September 28, 2006 | Apache Point | A. C. Becker | · | 2.4 km | MPC · JPL |
| 388331 | 2006 SK_{385} | — | September 29, 2006 | Apache Point | A. C. Becker | EOS | 1.8 km | MPC · JPL |
| 388332 | 2006 SW_{385} | — | September 29, 2006 | Apache Point | A. C. Becker | · | 3.3 km | MPC · JPL |
| 388333 | 2006 SZ_{387} | — | September 30, 2006 | Apache Point | A. C. Becker | EOS | 1.8 km | MPC · JPL |
| 388334 | 2006 SE_{389} | — | September 30, 2006 | Apache Point | A. C. Becker | EOS | 2.2 km | MPC · JPL |
| 388335 | 2006 SF_{412} | — | September 26, 2006 | Catalina | CSS | · | 3.4 km | MPC · JPL |
| 388336 | 2006 TY_{11} | — | October 15, 2006 | Piszkéstető | K. Sárneczky, Kuli, Z. | EOS | 2.0 km | MPC · JPL |
| 388337 | 2006 TK_{12} | — | September 25, 2006 | Anderson Mesa | LONEOS | · | 4.0 km | MPC · JPL |
| 388338 | 2006 TQ_{22} | — | October 11, 2006 | Kitt Peak | Spacewatch | · | 860 m | MPC · JPL |
| 388339 | 2006 TY_{22} | — | October 11, 2006 | Kitt Peak | Spacewatch | EOS | 2.2 km | MPC · JPL |
| 388340 | 2006 TP_{50} | — | October 12, 2006 | Kitt Peak | Spacewatch | · | 1.7 km | MPC · JPL |
| 388341 | 2006 TN_{52} | — | October 12, 2006 | Kitt Peak | Spacewatch | · | 3.6 km | MPC · JPL |
| 388342 | 2006 TL_{57} | — | September 30, 2006 | Mount Lemmon | Mount Lemmon Survey | · | 4.0 km | MPC · JPL |
| 388343 | 2006 TP_{59} | — | October 13, 2006 | Kitt Peak | Spacewatch | · | 3.2 km | MPC · JPL |
| 388344 | 2006 TW_{63} | — | July 21, 2006 | Mount Lemmon | Mount Lemmon Survey | · | 2.8 km | MPC · JPL |
| 388345 | 2006 TA_{91} | — | September 27, 2006 | Mount Lemmon | Mount Lemmon Survey | · | 3.2 km | MPC · JPL |
| 388346 | 2006 TM_{93} | — | October 15, 2006 | Kitt Peak | Spacewatch | · | 3.0 km | MPC · JPL |
| 388347 | 2006 TH_{101} | — | October 2, 2006 | Mount Lemmon | Mount Lemmon Survey | · | 3.7 km | MPC · JPL |
| 388348 | 2006 TR_{108} | — | October 11, 2006 | Apache Point | A. C. Becker | · | 2.7 km | MPC · JPL |
| 388349 | 2006 TF_{109} | — | October 3, 2006 | Mount Lemmon | Mount Lemmon Survey | · | 3.1 km | MPC · JPL |
| 388350 | 2006 TX_{109} | — | October 12, 2006 | Kitt Peak | Spacewatch | · | 2.7 km | MPC · JPL |
| 388351 | 2006 TA_{113} | — | October 1, 2006 | Apache Point | A. C. Becker | EOS | 1.9 km | MPC · JPL |
| 388352 | 2006 TR_{113} | — | October 1, 2006 | Apache Point | A. C. Becker | · | 2.1 km | MPC · JPL |
| 388353 | 2006 TV_{115} | — | October 2, 2006 | Apache Point | A. C. Becker | · | 2.8 km | MPC · JPL |
| 388354 | 2006 TY_{116} | — | October 3, 2006 | Apache Point | A. C. Becker | · | 2.1 km | MPC · JPL |
| 388355 | 2006 TX_{117} | — | October 3, 2006 | Apache Point | A. C. Becker | · | 2.7 km | MPC · JPL |
| 388356 | 2006 TY_{117} | — | October 3, 2006 | Apache Point | A. C. Becker | · | 3.1 km | MPC · JPL |
| 388357 | 2006 TA_{121} | — | October 12, 2006 | Apache Point | A. C. Becker | CYB | 2.9 km | MPC · JPL |
| 388358 | 2006 UR_{19} | — | October 16, 2006 | Kitt Peak | Spacewatch | · | 700 m | MPC · JPL |
| 388359 | 2006 UE_{20} | — | October 16, 2006 | Kitt Peak | Spacewatch | · | 2.6 km | MPC · JPL |
| 388360 | 2006 UC_{25} | — | October 16, 2006 | Kitt Peak | Spacewatch | · | 510 m | MPC · JPL |
| 388361 | 2006 UK_{33} | — | October 16, 2006 | Kitt Peak | Spacewatch | · | 2.7 km | MPC · JPL |
| 388362 | 2006 UQ_{34} | — | October 16, 2006 | Kitt Peak | Spacewatch | · | 2.1 km | MPC · JPL |
| 388363 | 2006 UW_{34} | — | October 16, 2006 | Kitt Peak | Spacewatch | VER | 3.6 km | MPC · JPL |
| 388364 | 2006 UK_{36} | — | September 27, 2006 | Mount Lemmon | Mount Lemmon Survey | · | 3.3 km | MPC · JPL |
| 388365 | 2006 UM_{43} | — | October 16, 2006 | Kitt Peak | Spacewatch | · | 3.0 km | MPC · JPL |
| 388366 | 2006 UT_{46} | — | October 16, 2006 | Kitt Peak | Spacewatch | 3:2 | 6.9 km | MPC · JPL |
| 388367 | 2006 UR_{47} | — | October 17, 2006 | Kitt Peak | Spacewatch | · | 3.4 km | MPC · JPL |
| 388368 | 2006 UD_{52} | — | October 17, 2006 | Mount Lemmon | Mount Lemmon Survey | · | 2.5 km | MPC · JPL |
| 388369 | 2006 UN_{62} | — | October 19, 2006 | Kitt Peak | Spacewatch | · | 2.1 km | MPC · JPL |
| 388370 Paulblu | 2006 UT_{62} | Paulblu | October 20, 2006 | Nogales | J.-C. Merlin | · | 2.5 km | MPC · JPL |
| 388371 | 2006 UU_{63} | — | October 22, 2006 | Kitt Peak | Spacewatch | · | 3.5 km | MPC · JPL |
| 388372 | 2006 UJ_{70} | — | October 16, 2006 | Kitt Peak | Spacewatch | EOS | 1.9 km | MPC · JPL |
| 388373 | 2006 UQ_{77} | — | October 17, 2006 | Kitt Peak | Spacewatch | · | 1.9 km | MPC · JPL |
| 388374 | 2006 UE_{79} | — | October 17, 2006 | Kitt Peak | Spacewatch | · | 2.5 km | MPC · JPL |
| 388375 | 2006 UC_{129} | — | October 19, 2006 | Kitt Peak | Spacewatch | EOS | 1.6 km | MPC · JPL |
| 388376 | 2006 UW_{158} | — | October 21, 2006 | Mount Lemmon | Mount Lemmon Survey | · | 2.6 km | MPC · JPL |
| 388377 | 2006 UY_{160} | — | October 21, 2006 | Mount Lemmon | Mount Lemmon Survey | THM | 2.2 km | MPC · JPL |
| 388378 | 2006 UE_{207} | — | October 23, 2006 | Kitt Peak | Spacewatch | · | 2.5 km | MPC · JPL |
| 388379 | 2006 UF_{211} | — | October 23, 2006 | Kitt Peak | Spacewatch | · | 2.8 km | MPC · JPL |
| 388380 | 2006 UW_{225} | — | October 20, 2006 | Palomar | NEAT | EOS | 1.9 km | MPC · JPL |
| 388381 | 2006 UF_{234} | — | October 22, 2006 | Kitt Peak | Spacewatch | THM | 2.3 km | MPC · JPL |
| 388382 | 2006 US_{258} | — | October 28, 2006 | Mount Lemmon | Mount Lemmon Survey | · | 2.2 km | MPC · JPL |
| 388383 | 2006 UG_{264} | — | October 27, 2006 | Kitt Peak | Spacewatch | · | 3.1 km | MPC · JPL |
| 388384 | 2006 UM_{267} | — | October 27, 2006 | Mount Lemmon | Mount Lemmon Survey | EOS | 1.7 km | MPC · JPL |
| 388385 | 2006 US_{268} | — | October 27, 2006 | Mount Lemmon | Mount Lemmon Survey | · | 2.6 km | MPC · JPL |
| 388386 | 2006 UP_{271} | — | October 27, 2006 | Mount Lemmon | Mount Lemmon Survey | MAS | 520 m | MPC · JPL |
| 388387 | 2006 UC_{275} | — | October 28, 2006 | Kitt Peak | Spacewatch | · | 2.8 km | MPC · JPL |
| 388388 | 2006 US_{291} | — | October 22, 2006 | Apache Point | SDSS | EOS | 1.7 km | MPC · JPL |
| 388389 | 2006 UD_{323} | — | October 19, 2006 | Kitt Peak | M. W. Buie | · | 2.8 km | MPC · JPL |
| 388390 | 2006 US_{328} | — | October 19, 2006 | Kitt Peak | Spacewatch | · | 3.7 km | MPC · JPL |
| 388391 | 2006 UX_{328} | — | October 21, 2006 | Mount Lemmon | Mount Lemmon Survey | · | 3.3 km | MPC · JPL |
| 388392 | 2006 UR_{332} | — | October 21, 2006 | Apache Point | A. C. Becker | EOS | 1.5 km | MPC · JPL |
| 388393 | 2006 UA_{346} | — | October 17, 2006 | Mount Lemmon | Mount Lemmon Survey | THM | 2.1 km | MPC · JPL |
| 388394 | 2006 UV_{360} | — | October 30, 2006 | Catalina | CSS | · | 830 m | MPC · JPL |
| 388395 | 2006 VL_{26} | — | November 10, 2006 | Kitt Peak | Spacewatch | · | 620 m | MPC · JPL |
| 388396 | 2006 VS_{31} | — | November 11, 2006 | Kitt Peak | Spacewatch | · | 780 m | MPC · JPL |
| 388397 | 2006 VT_{32} | — | October 15, 2006 | Kitt Peak | Spacewatch | THM | 2.4 km | MPC · JPL |
| 388398 | 2006 VS_{33} | — | November 11, 2006 | Mount Lemmon | Mount Lemmon Survey | HYG | 2.6 km | MPC · JPL |
| 388399 | 2006 VP_{47} | — | November 9, 2006 | Kitt Peak | Spacewatch | · | 3.0 km | MPC · JPL |
| 388400 | 2006 VL_{49} | — | November 10, 2006 | Kitt Peak | Spacewatch | · | 4.4 km | MPC · JPL |

== 388401–388500 ==
back to top

| Designation | | | Discovery | | | Properties | | Ref |
| Permanent | Provisional | Named after | Date | Site | Discoverer(s) | Category | Diam. | Ref |
|---|---|---|---|---|---|---|---|---|
| 388401 | 2006 VZ_{62} | — | October 17, 2006 | Catalina | CSS | · | 2.5 km | MPC · JPL |
| 388402 | 2006 VP_{71} | — | November 11, 2006 | Mount Lemmon | Mount Lemmon Survey | · | 2.4 km | MPC · JPL |
| 388403 | 2006 VO_{120} | — | November 14, 2006 | Kitt Peak | Spacewatch | · | 3.9 km | MPC · JPL |
| 388404 | 2006 WG_{41} | — | November 16, 2006 | Kitt Peak | Spacewatch | · | 5.3 km | MPC · JPL |
| 388405 | 2006 WS_{42} | — | November 16, 2006 | Kitt Peak | Spacewatch | HYG | 3.3 km | MPC · JPL |
| 388406 | 2006 WJ_{48} | — | November 16, 2006 | Kitt Peak | Spacewatch | · | 3.0 km | MPC · JPL |
| 388407 | 2006 WC_{56} | — | November 16, 2006 | Kitt Peak | Spacewatch | · | 740 m | MPC · JPL |
| 388408 | 2006 WM_{71} | — | November 18, 2006 | Kitt Peak | Spacewatch | EOS | 2.0 km | MPC · JPL |
| 388409 | 2006 WG_{93} | — | November 19, 2006 | Kitt Peak | Spacewatch | · | 3.1 km | MPC · JPL |
| 388410 | 2006 WF_{97} | — | October 15, 1995 | Kitt Peak | Spacewatch | · | 2.3 km | MPC · JPL |
| 388411 | 2006 WF_{100} | — | October 16, 2006 | Catalina | CSS | VER | 3.4 km | MPC · JPL |
| 388412 | 2006 WL_{104} | — | November 11, 2006 | Kitt Peak | Spacewatch | VER | 2.9 km | MPC · JPL |
| 388413 | 2006 WY_{157} | — | November 22, 2006 | Kitt Peak | Spacewatch | · | 790 m | MPC · JPL |
| 388414 | 2006 WD_{163} | — | November 23, 2006 | Kitt Peak | Spacewatch | · | 640 m | MPC · JPL |
| 388415 | 2006 WJ_{175} | — | November 23, 2006 | Kitt Peak | Spacewatch | · | 730 m | MPC · JPL |
| 388416 | 2006 WR_{178} | — | November 24, 2006 | Mount Lemmon | Mount Lemmon Survey | · | 2.7 km | MPC · JPL |
| 388417 | 2006 WB_{205} | — | November 18, 2006 | Kitt Peak | Spacewatch | · | 690 m | MPC · JPL |
| 388418 | 2006 XX_{49} | — | December 13, 2006 | Mount Lemmon | Mount Lemmon Survey | · | 1.1 km | MPC · JPL |
| 388419 | 2006 XL_{51} | — | December 14, 2006 | Kitt Peak | Spacewatch | · | 4.8 km | MPC · JPL |
| 388420 | 2006 XQ_{59} | — | December 14, 2006 | Kitt Peak | Spacewatch | · | 610 m | MPC · JPL |
| 388421 | 2006 XF_{63} | — | December 14, 2006 | Marly | P. Kocher | · | 640 m | MPC · JPL |
| 388422 | 2006 YF_{8} | — | December 20, 2006 | Mount Lemmon | Mount Lemmon Survey | · | 910 m | MPC · JPL |
| 388423 | 2006 YH_{15} | — | February 18, 2004 | Kitt Peak | Spacewatch | · | 810 m | MPC · JPL |
| 388424 | 2006 YT_{32} | — | December 21, 2006 | Kitt Peak | Spacewatch | · | 700 m | MPC · JPL |
| 388425 | 2006 YK_{52} | — | December 21, 2006 | Kitt Peak | Spacewatch | · | 660 m | MPC · JPL |
| 388426 | 2007 AR | — | January 8, 2007 | Catalina | CSS | (2076) | 860 m | MPC · JPL |
| 388427 | 2007 AQ_{1} | — | January 8, 2007 | Mount Lemmon | Mount Lemmon Survey | · | 710 m | MPC · JPL |
| 388428 | 2007 BX_{8} | — | January 17, 2007 | Kitt Peak | Spacewatch | · | 790 m | MPC · JPL |
| 388429 | 2007 BE_{10} | — | January 17, 2007 | Kitt Peak | Spacewatch | · | 660 m | MPC · JPL |
| 388430 | 2007 BN_{28} | — | January 24, 2007 | Mount Lemmon | Mount Lemmon Survey | · | 770 m | MPC · JPL |
| 388431 | 2007 BQ_{40} | — | January 24, 2007 | Mount Lemmon | Mount Lemmon Survey | · | 610 m | MPC · JPL |
| 388432 | 2007 BQ_{48} | — | January 26, 2007 | Kitt Peak | Spacewatch | · | 800 m | MPC · JPL |
| 388433 | 2007 BW_{55} | — | January 24, 2007 | Socorro | LINEAR | · | 760 m | MPC · JPL |
| 388434 | 2007 BY_{65} | — | January 27, 2007 | Mount Lemmon | Mount Lemmon Survey | · | 700 m | MPC · JPL |
| 388435 | 2007 BP_{69} | — | December 1, 2006 | Mount Lemmon | Mount Lemmon Survey | NYS | 1.2 km | MPC · JPL |
| 388436 | 2007 BY_{75} | — | January 27, 2007 | Kitt Peak | Spacewatch | · | 900 m | MPC · JPL |
| 388437 | 2007 BH_{77} | — | January 17, 2007 | Kitt Peak | Spacewatch | V | 640 m | MPC · JPL |
| 388438 | 2007 BV_{77} | — | January 17, 2007 | Kitt Peak | Spacewatch | · | 760 m | MPC · JPL |
| 388439 | 2007 BL_{81} | — | January 27, 2007 | Kitt Peak | Spacewatch | · | 600 m | MPC · JPL |
| 388440 | 2007 CH_{10} | — | February 6, 2007 | Mount Lemmon | Mount Lemmon Survey | · | 670 m | MPC · JPL |
| 388441 | 2007 CT_{15} | — | February 6, 2007 | Palomar | NEAT | fast | 930 m | MPC · JPL |
| 388442 | 2007 CW_{16} | — | February 8, 2007 | Mount Lemmon | Mount Lemmon Survey | · | 1.0 km | MPC · JPL |
| 388443 | 2007 CZ_{20} | — | February 6, 2007 | Mount Lemmon | Mount Lemmon Survey | · | 650 m | MPC · JPL |
| 388444 | 2007 CC_{22} | — | January 17, 2007 | Kitt Peak | Spacewatch | · | 950 m | MPC · JPL |
| 388445 | 2007 CG_{46} | — | February 8, 2007 | Palomar | NEAT | · | 740 m | MPC · JPL |
| 388446 | 2007 CG_{48} | — | February 10, 2007 | Mount Lemmon | Mount Lemmon Survey | · | 660 m | MPC · JPL |
| 388447 | 2007 CH_{62} | — | February 10, 2007 | Catalina | CSS | · | 900 m | MPC · JPL |
| 388448 | 2007 DY_{2} | — | February 16, 2007 | Catalina | CSS | · | 950 m | MPC · JPL |
| 388449 | 2007 DO_{3} | — | February 16, 2007 | Mount Lemmon | Mount Lemmon Survey | · | 900 m | MPC · JPL |
| 388450 | 2007 DX_{7} | — | January 29, 2007 | Kitt Peak | Spacewatch | · | 950 m | MPC · JPL |
| 388451 | 2007 DJ_{14} | — | February 17, 2007 | Kitt Peak | Spacewatch | · | 630 m | MPC · JPL |
| 388452 | 2007 DF_{19} | — | February 17, 2007 | Kitt Peak | Spacewatch | · | 800 m | MPC · JPL |
| 388453 | 2007 DA_{26} | — | February 17, 2007 | Kitt Peak | Spacewatch | NYS | 1.0 km | MPC · JPL |
| 388454 | 2007 DY_{29} | — | February 17, 2007 | Kitt Peak | Spacewatch | · | 1.1 km | MPC · JPL |
| 388455 | 2007 DR_{32} | — | February 17, 2007 | Kitt Peak | Spacewatch | · | 940 m | MPC · JPL |
| 388456 | 2007 DL_{33} | — | February 17, 2007 | Kitt Peak | Spacewatch | · | 810 m | MPC · JPL |
| 388457 | 2007 DV_{33} | — | February 17, 2007 | Kitt Peak | Spacewatch | · | 740 m | MPC · JPL |
| 388458 | 2007 DS_{36} | — | February 17, 2007 | Kitt Peak | Spacewatch | · | 720 m | MPC · JPL |
| 388459 | 2007 DF_{43} | — | January 30, 2000 | Kitt Peak | Spacewatch | · | 1.0 km | MPC · JPL |
| 388460 | 2007 DQ_{43} | — | February 17, 2007 | Goodricke-Pigott | R. A. Tucker | · | 1.1 km | MPC · JPL |
| 388461 | 2007 DZ_{53} | — | February 21, 2007 | Kitt Peak | Spacewatch | · | 1.8 km | MPC · JPL |
| 388462 | 2007 DC_{56} | — | February 21, 2007 | Socorro | LINEAR | · | 1.1 km | MPC · JPL |
| 388463 | 2007 DK_{64} | — | February 21, 2007 | Kitt Peak | Spacewatch | · | 790 m | MPC · JPL |
| 388464 | 2007 DV_{70} | — | February 21, 2007 | Kitt Peak | Spacewatch | · | 710 m | MPC · JPL |
| 388465 | 2007 DS_{72} | — | February 21, 2007 | Kitt Peak | Spacewatch | · | 990 m | MPC · JPL |
| 388466 | 2007 DD_{75} | — | February 21, 2007 | Mount Lemmon | Mount Lemmon Survey | · | 870 m | MPC · JPL |
| 388467 | 2007 DZ_{76} | — | February 22, 2007 | Catalina | CSS | · | 1.9 km | MPC · JPL |
| 388468 | 2007 DB_{83} | — | February 24, 2007 | Črni Vrh | Matičič, S. | AMO | 780 m | MPC · JPL |
| 388469 | 2007 DN_{85} | — | February 21, 2007 | Mount Lemmon | Mount Lemmon Survey | · | 870 m | MPC · JPL |
| 388470 | 2007 DT_{85} | — | February 21, 2007 | Mount Lemmon | Mount Lemmon Survey | · | 810 m | MPC · JPL |
| 388471 | 2007 DS_{95} | — | February 23, 2007 | Kitt Peak | Spacewatch | · | 980 m | MPC · JPL |
| 388472 | 2007 DD_{99} | — | February 25, 2007 | Mount Lemmon | Mount Lemmon Survey | · | 950 m | MPC · JPL |
| 388473 | 2007 DS_{99} | — | February 25, 2007 | Mount Lemmon | Mount Lemmon Survey | · | 810 m | MPC · JPL |
| 388474 | 2007 DF_{105} | — | February 26, 2007 | Mount Lemmon | Mount Lemmon Survey | · | 810 m | MPC · JPL |
| 388475 | 2007 EC_{1} | — | March 6, 2007 | Palomar | NEAT | PHO | 1.1 km | MPC · JPL |
| 388476 | 2007 EQ_{7} | — | March 9, 2007 | Mount Lemmon | Mount Lemmon Survey | · | 700 m | MPC · JPL |
| 388477 | 2007 EG_{8} | — | March 9, 2007 | Palomar | NEAT | · | 840 m | MPC · JPL |
| 388478 | 2007 EM_{28} | — | March 9, 2007 | Palomar | NEAT | ERI | 1.4 km | MPC · JPL |
| 388479 | 2007 ET_{29} | — | March 9, 2007 | Kitt Peak | Spacewatch | · | 870 m | MPC · JPL |
| 388480 | 2007 EE_{31} | — | February 6, 2007 | Kitt Peak | Spacewatch | V | 670 m | MPC · JPL |
| 388481 | 2007 EB_{44} | — | March 9, 2007 | Kitt Peak | Spacewatch | · | 780 m | MPC · JPL |
| 388482 | 2007 EU_{45} | — | March 9, 2007 | Kitt Peak | Spacewatch | · | 1.2 km | MPC · JPL |
| 388483 | 2007 EP_{47} | — | March 9, 2007 | Mount Lemmon | Mount Lemmon Survey | · | 1.6 km | MPC · JPL |
| 388484 | 2007 EY_{47} | — | March 9, 2007 | Kitt Peak | Spacewatch | · | 960 m | MPC · JPL |
| 388485 | 2007 EP_{64} | — | March 10, 2007 | Kitt Peak | Spacewatch | · | 880 m | MPC · JPL |
| 388486 | 2007 EP_{68} | — | March 10, 2007 | Kitt Peak | Spacewatch | · | 1.1 km | MPC · JPL |
| 388487 | 2007 EL_{71} | — | March 10, 2007 | Kitt Peak | Spacewatch | · | 920 m | MPC · JPL |
| 388488 | 2007 ED_{72} | — | March 10, 2007 | Kitt Peak | Spacewatch | · | 1.3 km | MPC · JPL |
| 388489 | 2007 EA_{74} | — | March 10, 2007 | Kitt Peak | Spacewatch | · | 940 m | MPC · JPL |
| 388490 | 2007 EL_{75} | — | March 10, 2007 | Kitt Peak | Spacewatch | · | 1.5 km | MPC · JPL |
| 388491 | 2007 EZ_{78} | — | March 10, 2007 | Palomar | NEAT | · | 980 m | MPC · JPL |
| 388492 | 2007 ET_{79} | — | March 10, 2007 | Mount Lemmon | Mount Lemmon Survey | MAS | 760 m | MPC · JPL |
| 388493 | 2007 EX_{90} | — | March 9, 2007 | Mount Lemmon | Mount Lemmon Survey | · | 870 m | MPC · JPL |
| 388494 | 2007 EY_{94} | — | October 20, 2001 | Socorro | LINEAR | NYS | 730 m | MPC · JPL |
| 388495 | 2007 EQ_{96} | — | March 10, 2007 | Mount Lemmon | Mount Lemmon Survey | MAS | 680 m | MPC · JPL |
| 388496 | 2007 EM_{97} | — | March 11, 2007 | Kitt Peak | Spacewatch | · | 930 m | MPC · JPL |
| 388497 | 2007 EC_{105} | — | March 11, 2007 | Mount Lemmon | Mount Lemmon Survey | · | 740 m | MPC · JPL |
| 388498 | 2007 ES_{105} | — | March 11, 2007 | Kitt Peak | Spacewatch | · | 1.0 km | MPC · JPL |
| 388499 | 2007 EK_{107} | — | March 11, 2007 | Kitt Peak | Spacewatch | · | 660 m | MPC · JPL |
| 388500 | 2007 EA_{110} | — | March 11, 2007 | Kitt Peak | Spacewatch | · | 1.2 km | MPC · JPL |

== 388501–388600 ==
back to top

| Designation | | | Discovery | | | Properties | | Ref |
| Permanent | Provisional | Named after | Date | Site | Discoverer(s) | Category | Diam. | Ref |
|---|---|---|---|---|---|---|---|---|
| 388501 | 2007 EE_{113} | — | March 12, 2007 | Kitt Peak | Spacewatch | · | 900 m | MPC · JPL |
| 388502 | 2007 ED_{132} | — | March 9, 2007 | Mount Lemmon | Mount Lemmon Survey | · | 710 m | MPC · JPL |
| 388503 | 2007 EH_{136} | — | March 10, 2007 | Mount Lemmon | Mount Lemmon Survey | · | 810 m | MPC · JPL |
| 388504 | 2007 EW_{136} | — | March 10, 2007 | Palomar | NEAT | · | 980 m | MPC · JPL |
| 388505 | 2007 EB_{146} | — | March 12, 2007 | Mount Lemmon | Mount Lemmon Survey | · | 880 m | MPC · JPL |
| 388506 | 2007 ER_{156} | — | March 12, 2007 | Kitt Peak | Spacewatch | · | 1.2 km | MPC · JPL |
| 388507 | 2007 EW_{159} | — | March 14, 2007 | Mount Lemmon | Mount Lemmon Survey | · | 1.2 km | MPC · JPL |
| 388508 | 2007 EM_{167} | — | March 12, 2007 | Kitt Peak | Spacewatch | PHO | 880 m | MPC · JPL |
| 388509 | 2007 EC_{173} | — | March 14, 2007 | Kitt Peak | Spacewatch | · | 1.3 km | MPC · JPL |
| 388510 | 2007 EB_{189} | — | March 13, 2007 | Mount Lemmon | Mount Lemmon Survey | (2076) | 690 m | MPC · JPL |
| 388511 | 2007 EZ_{195} | — | March 15, 2007 | Mount Lemmon | Mount Lemmon Survey | PHO | 1.1 km | MPC · JPL |
| 388512 | 2007 EW_{206} | — | March 13, 2007 | Mount Lemmon | Mount Lemmon Survey | V | 650 m | MPC · JPL |
| 388513 | 2007 EQ_{214} | — | March 13, 2007 | Kitt Peak | Spacewatch | · | 800 m | MPC · JPL |
| 388514 | 2007 EO_{217} | — | March 11, 2007 | Mount Lemmon | Mount Lemmon Survey | · | 1.0 km | MPC · JPL |
| 388515 | 2007 FE_{18} | — | March 17, 2007 | Socorro | LINEAR | · | 1.1 km | MPC · JPL |
| 388516 | 2007 FT_{24} | — | March 20, 2007 | Mount Lemmon | Mount Lemmon Survey | MAS | 700 m | MPC · JPL |
| 388517 | 2007 GJ_{6} | — | April 11, 2007 | Socorro | LINEAR | PHO | 1.2 km | MPC · JPL |
| 388518 | 2007 GU_{22} | — | April 11, 2007 | Mount Lemmon | Mount Lemmon Survey | V | 680 m | MPC · JPL |
| 388519 | 2007 GE_{26} | — | April 14, 2007 | Mount Lemmon | Mount Lemmon Survey | · | 1.0 km | MPC · JPL |
| 388520 | 2007 GN_{31} | — | February 23, 2007 | Mount Lemmon | Mount Lemmon Survey | MAS | 610 m | MPC · JPL |
| 388521 | 2007 GV_{32} | — | March 11, 2007 | Kitt Peak | Spacewatch | · | 880 m | MPC · JPL |
| 388522 | 2007 GM_{40} | — | April 14, 2007 | Kitt Peak | Spacewatch | MAS | 790 m | MPC · JPL |
| 388523 | 2007 GK_{45} | — | April 14, 2007 | Kitt Peak | Spacewatch | · | 980 m | MPC · JPL |
| 388524 | 2007 GF_{47} | — | April 14, 2007 | Kitt Peak | Spacewatch | · | 1.1 km | MPC · JPL |
| 388525 | 2007 GJ_{47} | — | April 14, 2007 | Kitt Peak | Spacewatch | NYS | 1.2 km | MPC · JPL |
| 388526 | 2007 GD_{48} | — | April 14, 2007 | Kitt Peak | Spacewatch | MAS | 630 m | MPC · JPL |
| 388527 | 2007 GR_{52} | — | April 14, 2007 | Kitt Peak | Spacewatch | · | 1.2 km | MPC · JPL |
| 388528 | 2007 GS_{58} | — | April 15, 2007 | Mount Lemmon | Mount Lemmon Survey | · | 1.9 km | MPC · JPL |
| 388529 | 2007 GS_{60} | — | April 15, 2007 | Kitt Peak | Spacewatch | V | 890 m | MPC · JPL |
| 388530 | 2007 GF_{63} | — | April 15, 2007 | Kitt Peak | Spacewatch | NYS | 1.2 km | MPC · JPL |
| 388531 | 2007 HO_{2} | — | April 16, 2007 | Mount Lemmon | Mount Lemmon Survey | · | 1.3 km | MPC · JPL |
| 388532 | 2007 HV_{5} | — | April 16, 2007 | Catalina | CSS | · | 1.1 km | MPC · JPL |
| 388533 | 2007 HO_{6} | — | April 16, 2007 | Anderson Mesa | LONEOS | · | 1.3 km | MPC · JPL |
| 388534 | 2007 HF_{22} | — | April 18, 2007 | Kitt Peak | Spacewatch | · | 910 m | MPC · JPL |
| 388535 | 2007 HN_{31} | — | April 19, 2007 | Kitt Peak | Spacewatch | 3:2 | 5.5 km | MPC · JPL |
| 388536 | 2007 HR_{42} | — | April 22, 2007 | Mount Lemmon | Mount Lemmon Survey | · | 1.3 km | MPC · JPL |
| 388537 | 2007 HW_{47} | — | April 20, 2007 | Kitt Peak | Spacewatch | · | 1.0 km | MPC · JPL |
| 388538 | 2007 HP_{58} | — | April 23, 2007 | Catalina | CSS | · | 1.5 km | MPC · JPL |
| 388539 | 2007 HT_{62} | — | April 22, 2007 | Mount Lemmon | Mount Lemmon Survey | · | 1.1 km | MPC · JPL |
| 388540 | 2007 HG_{81} | — | April 25, 2007 | Mount Lemmon | Mount Lemmon Survey | MAS | 640 m | MPC · JPL |
| 388541 | 2007 HS_{84} | — | April 22, 2007 | Kitt Peak | Spacewatch | · | 960 m | MPC · JPL |
| 388542 | 2007 HQ_{85} | — | April 24, 2007 | Kitt Peak | Spacewatch | · | 940 m | MPC · JPL |
| 388543 | 2007 HF_{95} | — | April 19, 2007 | Mount Lemmon | Mount Lemmon Survey | · | 1.6 km | MPC · JPL |
| 388544 | 2007 JC_{4} | — | May 7, 2007 | Kitt Peak | Spacewatch | · | 1.5 km | MPC · JPL |
| 388545 | 2007 JB_{16} | — | May 9, 2007 | Lulin | LUSS | · | 1.2 km | MPC · JPL |
| 388546 | 2007 JA_{18} | — | May 8, 2007 | Anderson Mesa | LONEOS | · | 1.5 km | MPC · JPL |
| 388547 | 2007 JM_{31} | — | May 12, 2007 | Mount Lemmon | Mount Lemmon Survey | MAS | 900 m | MPC · JPL |
| 388548 | 2007 JZ_{31} | — | May 12, 2007 | Mount Lemmon | Mount Lemmon Survey | · | 930 m | MPC · JPL |
| 388549 | 2007 LQ_{15} | — | June 8, 2007 | Catalina | CSS | NYS | 1.2 km | MPC · JPL |
| 388550 | 2007 LX_{24} | — | October 8, 2004 | Kitt Peak | Spacewatch | NYS | 1.1 km | MPC · JPL |
| 388551 | 2007 MJ_{2} | — | June 16, 2007 | Kitt Peak | Spacewatch | · | 1.5 km | MPC · JPL |
| 388552 | 2007 MZ_{8} | — | June 19, 2007 | Kitt Peak | Spacewatch | · | 1.6 km | MPC · JPL |
| 388553 | 2007 MK_{27} | — | June 23, 2007 | Kitt Peak | Spacewatch | H | 620 m | MPC · JPL |
| 388554 | 2007 NA_{1} | — | July 11, 2007 | La Sagra | OAM | · | 1.3 km | MPC · JPL |
| 388555 | 2007 NE_{6} | — | July 10, 2007 | Siding Spring | SSS | · | 2.0 km | MPC · JPL |
| 388556 | 2007 OD_{2} | — | July 19, 2007 | Tiki | S. F. Hönig, Teamo, N. | · | 2.1 km | MPC · JPL |
| 388557 | 2007 PS_{7} | — | August 10, 2007 | Kitt Peak | Spacewatch | · | 3.4 km | MPC · JPL |
| 388558 | 2007 PO_{8} | — | July 18, 2007 | Mount Lemmon | Mount Lemmon Survey | EOS | 1.8 km | MPC · JPL |
| 388559 | 2007 PB_{14} | — | August 8, 2007 | Socorro | LINEAR | MAR | 1.2 km | MPC · JPL |
| 388560 | 2007 PY_{17} | — | September 30, 1973 | Palomar | C. J. van Houten, I. van Houten-Groeneveld, T. Gehrels | · | 6.4 km | MPC · JPL |
| 388561 | 2007 PG_{36} | — | August 13, 2007 | Socorro | LINEAR | · | 1.9 km | MPC · JPL |
| 388562 | 2007 PQ_{39} | — | August 11, 2007 | Anderson Mesa | LONEOS | · | 2.3 km | MPC · JPL |
| 388563 | 2007 PC_{43} | — | August 9, 2007 | Socorro | LINEAR | EUN | 1.7 km | MPC · JPL |
| 388564 | 2007 QB_{5} | — | August 31, 2007 | Siding Spring | K. Sárneczky, L. Kiss | (5) | 1.2 km | MPC · JPL |
| 388565 | 2007 QX_{6} | — | August 21, 2007 | Anderson Mesa | LONEOS | · | 1.7 km | MPC · JPL |
| 388566 | 2007 QQ_{10} | — | August 10, 2007 | Kitt Peak | Spacewatch | · | 2.3 km | MPC · JPL |
| 388567 | 2007 QX_{14} | — | August 24, 2007 | Purple Mountain | PMO NEO Survey Program | AMO +1km | 930 m | MPC · JPL |
| 388568 | 2007 QW_{15} | — | August 16, 2007 | Purple Mountain | PMO NEO Survey Program | · | 2.0 km | MPC · JPL |
| 388569 | 2007 QE_{16} | — | August 22, 2007 | Anderson Mesa | LONEOS | · | 2.2 km | MPC · JPL |
| 388570 | 2007 RT_{2} | — | September 2, 2007 | Mount Lemmon | Mount Lemmon Survey | · | 2.0 km | MPC · JPL |
| 388571 | 2007 RZ_{31} | — | September 5, 2007 | Catalina | CSS | ADE | 2.4 km | MPC · JPL |
| 388572 | 2007 RX_{33} | — | September 5, 2007 | Mount Lemmon | Mount Lemmon Survey | · | 2.5 km | MPC · JPL |
| 388573 | 2007 RB_{36} | — | September 8, 2007 | Anderson Mesa | LONEOS | ADE | 2.8 km | MPC · JPL |
| 388574 | 2007 RB_{43} | — | September 9, 2007 | Kitt Peak | Spacewatch | · | 1.4 km | MPC · JPL |
| 388575 | 2007 RO_{57} | — | September 9, 2007 | Kitt Peak | Spacewatch | · | 2.7 km | MPC · JPL |
| 388576 | 2007 RN_{69} | — | September 10, 2007 | Kitt Peak | Spacewatch | · | 2.4 km | MPC · JPL |
| 388577 | 2007 RC_{71} | — | September 10, 2007 | Kitt Peak | Spacewatch | · | 1.6 km | MPC · JPL |
| 388578 | 2007 RV_{73} | — | August 10, 2007 | Kitt Peak | Spacewatch | · | 2.2 km | MPC · JPL |
| 388579 | 2007 RC_{75} | — | September 10, 2007 | Mount Lemmon | Mount Lemmon Survey | · | 1.5 km | MPC · JPL |
| 388580 | 2007 RC_{82} | — | September 10, 2007 | Mount Lemmon | Mount Lemmon Survey | · | 2.0 km | MPC · JPL |
| 388581 | 2007 RB_{90} | — | September 10, 2007 | Mount Lemmon | Mount Lemmon Survey | · | 1.7 km | MPC · JPL |
| 388582 | 2007 RY_{91} | — | September 10, 2007 | Mount Lemmon | Mount Lemmon Survey | · | 1.5 km | MPC · JPL |
| 388583 | 2007 RE_{97} | — | September 10, 2007 | Mount Lemmon | Mount Lemmon Survey | · | 3.3 km | MPC · JPL |
| 388584 | 2007 RZ_{101} | — | September 11, 2007 | Catalina | CSS | H | 550 m | MPC · JPL |
| 388585 | 2007 RQ_{105} | — | August 24, 2007 | Kitt Peak | Spacewatch | · | 1.7 km | MPC · JPL |
| 388586 | 2007 RU_{115} | — | September 11, 2007 | Kitt Peak | Spacewatch | AGN | 1.1 km | MPC · JPL |
| 388587 | 2007 RW_{122} | — | September 12, 2007 | Mount Lemmon | Mount Lemmon Survey | NEM | 2.1 km | MPC · JPL |
| 388588 | 2007 RC_{126} | — | September 12, 2007 | Catalina | CSS | H | 790 m | MPC · JPL |
| 388589 | 2007 RH_{129} | — | September 28, 2003 | Kitt Peak | Spacewatch | (5) | 1.2 km | MPC · JPL |
| 388590 | 2007 RE_{130} | — | September 12, 2007 | Anderson Mesa | LONEOS | H | 680 m | MPC · JPL |
| 388591 | 2007 RO_{138} | — | September 11, 2007 | Mount Lemmon | Mount Lemmon Survey | · | 2.2 km | MPC · JPL |
| 388592 | 2007 RZ_{143} | — | September 14, 2007 | Socorro | LINEAR | · | 2.4 km | MPC · JPL |
| 388593 | 2007 RX_{145} | — | September 14, 2007 | Socorro | LINEAR | H | 620 m | MPC · JPL |
| 388594 | 2007 RQ_{169} | — | September 10, 2007 | Kitt Peak | Spacewatch | · | 2.7 km | MPC · JPL |
| 388595 | 2007 RW_{169} | — | August 24, 2007 | Kitt Peak | Spacewatch | · | 1.7 km | MPC · JPL |
| 388596 | 2007 RX_{177} | — | September 10, 2007 | Kitt Peak | Spacewatch | · | 1.4 km | MPC · JPL |
| 388597 | 2007 RY_{179} | — | September 10, 2007 | Mount Lemmon | Mount Lemmon Survey | EOS | 2.1 km | MPC · JPL |
| 388598 | 2007 RX_{181} | — | September 11, 2007 | Mount Lemmon | Mount Lemmon Survey | · | 2.5 km | MPC · JPL |
| 388599 | 2007 RQ_{183} | — | September 12, 2007 | Mount Lemmon | Mount Lemmon Survey | BRU | 3.5 km | MPC · JPL |
| 388600 | 2007 RF_{187} | — | September 13, 2007 | Mount Lemmon | Mount Lemmon Survey | · | 1.8 km | MPC · JPL |

== 388601–388700 ==
back to top

| Designation | | | Discovery | | | Properties | | Ref |
| Permanent | Provisional | Named after | Date | Site | Discoverer(s) | Category | Diam. | Ref |
|---|---|---|---|---|---|---|---|---|
| 388601 | 2007 RM_{191} | — | September 11, 2007 | Kitt Peak | Spacewatch | · | 1.6 km | MPC · JPL |
| 388602 | 2007 RX_{202} | — | September 13, 2007 | Kitt Peak | Spacewatch | · | 1.5 km | MPC · JPL |
| 388603 | 2007 RJ_{231} | — | September 11, 2007 | Mount Lemmon | Mount Lemmon Survey | MAR | 1.0 km | MPC · JPL |
| 388604 | 2007 RO_{243} | — | September 15, 2007 | Socorro | LINEAR | · | 1.7 km | MPC · JPL |
| 388605 | 2007 RF_{246} | — | August 10, 2007 | Kitt Peak | Spacewatch | LIX | 3.5 km | MPC · JPL |
| 388606 | 2007 RD_{273} | — | September 15, 2007 | Kitt Peak | Spacewatch | · | 2.1 km | MPC · JPL |
| 388607 | 2007 RB_{284} | — | September 9, 2007 | Mount Lemmon | Mount Lemmon Survey | · | 1.9 km | MPC · JPL |
| 388608 | 2007 RD_{287} | — | September 8, 2007 | Mount Lemmon | Mount Lemmon Survey | · | 1.7 km | MPC · JPL |
| 388609 | 2007 RG_{296} | — | September 14, 2007 | Mount Lemmon | Mount Lemmon Survey | · | 1.7 km | MPC · JPL |
| 388610 | 2007 RC_{300} | — | November 24, 2003 | Kitt Peak | Spacewatch | NEM | 2.7 km | MPC · JPL |
| 388611 | 2007 RL_{302} | — | September 15, 2007 | Mount Lemmon | Mount Lemmon Survey | · | 2.0 km | MPC · JPL |
| 388612 | 2007 RM_{308} | — | September 12, 2007 | Mount Lemmon | Mount Lemmon Survey | · | 1.2 km | MPC · JPL |
| 388613 | 2007 RX_{314} | — | September 4, 2007 | Mount Lemmon | Mount Lemmon Survey | · | 2.2 km | MPC · JPL |
| 388614 | 2007 SE_{5} | — | September 18, 2007 | Socorro | LINEAR | H | 710 m | MPC · JPL |
| 388615 | 2007 SO_{5} | — | September 19, 2007 | Socorro | LINEAR | · | 2.2 km | MPC · JPL |
| 388616 | 2007 SL_{19} | — | September 21, 2007 | Kitt Peak | Spacewatch | · | 2.1 km | MPC · JPL |
| 388617 | 2007 TO_{7} | — | October 7, 2007 | Pla D'Arguines | R. Ferrando | · | 1.8 km | MPC · JPL |
| 388618 | 2007 TS_{18} | — | October 8, 2007 | La Sagra | OAM | H | 800 m | MPC · JPL |
| 388619 | 2007 TT_{20} | — | October 8, 2007 | Cordell-Lorenz | Cordell-Lorenz | · | 1.8 km | MPC · JPL |
| 388620 | 2007 TQ_{22} | — | October 9, 2007 | Mount Lemmon | Mount Lemmon Survey | · | 2.9 km | MPC · JPL |
| 388621 | 2007 TN_{28} | — | October 4, 2007 | Kitt Peak | Spacewatch | · | 1.8 km | MPC · JPL |
| 388622 | 2007 TO_{37} | — | October 4, 2007 | Catalina | CSS | · | 2.0 km | MPC · JPL |
| 388623 | 2007 TA_{44} | — | October 7, 2007 | Mount Lemmon | Mount Lemmon Survey | · | 2.5 km | MPC · JPL |
| 388624 | 2007 TH_{50} | — | October 4, 2007 | Kitt Peak | Spacewatch | · | 2.4 km | MPC · JPL |
| 388625 | 2007 TQ_{52} | — | October 4, 2007 | Kitt Peak | Spacewatch | · | 1.9 km | MPC · JPL |
| 388626 | 2007 TB_{60} | — | October 5, 2007 | Kitt Peak | Spacewatch | · | 2.7 km | MPC · JPL |
| 388627 | 2007 TS_{65} | — | October 4, 2007 | Kitt Peak | Spacewatch | · | 1.4 km | MPC · JPL |
| 388628 | 2007 TA_{67} | — | October 12, 2007 | Dauban | Chante-Perdrix | EOS | 1.9 km | MPC · JPL |
| 388629 | 2007 TL_{69} | — | October 14, 2007 | Altschwendt | W. Ries | KOR | 1.2 km | MPC · JPL |
| 388630 | 2007 TH_{73} | — | October 14, 2007 | Altschwendt | W. Ries | AST | 1.7 km | MPC · JPL |
| 388631 | 2007 TM_{88} | — | October 8, 2007 | Mount Lemmon | Mount Lemmon Survey | · | 1.5 km | MPC · JPL |
| 388632 | 2007 TO_{89} | — | October 8, 2007 | Mount Lemmon | Mount Lemmon Survey | · | 1.9 km | MPC · JPL |
| 388633 | 2007 TQ_{102} | — | October 8, 2007 | Mount Lemmon | Mount Lemmon Survey | HOF | 2.7 km | MPC · JPL |
| 388634 | 2007 TE_{103} | — | September 15, 2007 | Mount Lemmon | Mount Lemmon Survey | · | 2.6 km | MPC · JPL |
| 388635 | 2007 TM_{113} | — | October 8, 2007 | Anderson Mesa | LONEOS | T_{j} (2.99) | 3.5 km | MPC · JPL |
| 388636 | 2007 TG_{118} | — | September 14, 2007 | Mount Lemmon | Mount Lemmon Survey | · | 1.9 km | MPC · JPL |
| 388637 | 2007 TE_{119} | — | September 15, 2007 | Mount Lemmon | Mount Lemmon Survey | · | 1.4 km | MPC · JPL |
| 388638 | 2007 TR_{131} | — | October 7, 2007 | Mount Lemmon | Mount Lemmon Survey | EOS | 1.9 km | MPC · JPL |
| 388639 | 2007 TJ_{141} | — | October 9, 2007 | Mount Lemmon | Mount Lemmon Survey | · | 2.8 km | MPC · JPL |
| 388640 | 2007 TS_{151} | — | October 9, 2007 | Socorro | LINEAR | MRX | 990 m | MPC · JPL |
| 388641 | 2007 TU_{154} | — | October 9, 2007 | Socorro | LINEAR | · | 1.9 km | MPC · JPL |
| 388642 | 2007 TG_{163} | — | October 11, 2007 | Socorro | LINEAR | AEO | 1.2 km | MPC · JPL |
| 388643 | 2007 TY_{164} | — | October 4, 2007 | Catalina | CSS | GEF | 1.4 km | MPC · JPL |
| 388644 | 2007 TD_{169} | — | October 12, 2007 | Socorro | LINEAR | · | 1.7 km | MPC · JPL |
| 388645 | 2007 TH_{174} | — | October 4, 2007 | Kitt Peak | Spacewatch | · | 1.7 km | MPC · JPL |
| 388646 | 2007 TT_{177} | — | October 6, 2007 | Kitt Peak | Spacewatch | · | 2.9 km | MPC · JPL |
| 388647 | 2007 TB_{193} | — | October 6, 2007 | 7300 | W. K. Y. Yeung | · | 1.8 km | MPC · JPL |
| 388648 | 2007 TJ_{199} | — | October 8, 2007 | Kitt Peak | Spacewatch | · | 2.0 km | MPC · JPL |
| 388649 | 2007 TK_{235} | — | October 9, 2007 | Mount Lemmon | Mount Lemmon Survey | · | 3.2 km | MPC · JPL |
| 388650 | 2007 TU_{245} | — | February 2, 2005 | Kitt Peak | Spacewatch | · | 2.1 km | MPC · JPL |
| 388651 | 2007 TP_{248} | — | October 10, 2007 | Kitt Peak | Spacewatch | · | 1.9 km | MPC · JPL |
| 388652 | 2007 TP_{253} | — | October 8, 2007 | Mount Lemmon | Mount Lemmon Survey | THM | 2.2 km | MPC · JPL |
| 388653 | 2007 TS_{253} | — | September 11, 2007 | Mount Lemmon | Mount Lemmon Survey | WIT | 860 m | MPC · JPL |
| 388654 | 2007 TY_{260} | — | October 10, 2007 | Kitt Peak | Spacewatch | · | 1.6 km | MPC · JPL |
| 388655 | 2007 TR_{265} | — | October 11, 2007 | Kitt Peak | Spacewatch | WIT | 910 m | MPC · JPL |
| 388656 | 2007 TK_{269} | — | October 9, 2007 | Kitt Peak | Spacewatch | · | 2.6 km | MPC · JPL |
| 388657 | 2007 TE_{270} | — | October 9, 2007 | Kitt Peak | Spacewatch | · | 2.2 km | MPC · JPL |
| 388658 | 2007 TA_{280} | — | October 13, 2007 | Kitt Peak | Spacewatch | · | 1.4 km | MPC · JPL |
| 388659 | 2007 TZ_{287} | — | October 11, 2007 | Catalina | CSS | GEF | 1.6 km | MPC · JPL |
| 388660 | 2007 TF_{290} | — | October 12, 2007 | Catalina | CSS | · | 3.2 km | MPC · JPL |
| 388661 | 2007 TS_{327} | — | October 11, 2007 | Kitt Peak | Spacewatch | GEF | 1.4 km | MPC · JPL |
| 388662 | 2007 TO_{328} | — | October 11, 2007 | Kitt Peak | Spacewatch | · | 2.3 km | MPC · JPL |
| 388663 | 2007 TX_{334} | — | October 11, 2007 | Kitt Peak | Spacewatch | · | 2.1 km | MPC · JPL |
| 388664 | 2007 TG_{337} | — | October 13, 2007 | Catalina | CSS | H | 560 m | MPC · JPL |
| 388665 | 2007 TF_{354} | — | October 10, 2007 | Catalina | CSS | · | 2.8 km | MPC · JPL |
| 388666 | 2007 TT_{369} | — | July 19, 2007 | Siding Spring | SSS | H | 640 m | MPC · JPL |
| 388667 | 2007 TY_{370} | — | October 12, 2007 | Mount Lemmon | Mount Lemmon Survey | EOS | 2.3 km | MPC · JPL |
| 388668 | 2007 TP_{373} | — | October 14, 2007 | Mount Lemmon | Mount Lemmon Survey | (1547) | 2.1 km | MPC · JPL |
| 388669 | 2007 TL_{383} | — | October 14, 2007 | Kitt Peak | Spacewatch | KOR | 1.3 km | MPC · JPL |
| 388670 | 2007 TZ_{397} | — | September 25, 2007 | Mount Lemmon | Mount Lemmon Survey | EOS | 2.0 km | MPC · JPL |
| 388671 | 2007 TP_{399} | — | October 15, 2007 | Kitt Peak | Spacewatch | · | 2.1 km | MPC · JPL |
| 388672 | 2007 TW_{418} | — | October 9, 2007 | Kitt Peak | Spacewatch | HOF | 2.7 km | MPC · JPL |
| 388673 | 2007 TV_{426} | — | October 9, 2007 | Kitt Peak | Spacewatch | · | 1.9 km | MPC · JPL |
| 388674 | 2007 TH_{435} | — | October 12, 2007 | Kitt Peak | Spacewatch | THM | 1.9 km | MPC · JPL |
| 388675 | 2007 TZ_{444} | — | October 11, 2007 | Lulin | LUSS | · | 3.0 km | MPC · JPL |
| 388676 | 2007 TE_{447} | — | October 10, 2007 | Mount Lemmon | Mount Lemmon Survey | KOR | 1.5 km | MPC · JPL |
| 388677 | 2007 TJ_{448} | — | October 7, 2007 | Mount Lemmon | Mount Lemmon Survey | · | 1.7 km | MPC · JPL |
| 388678 | 2007 UH_{10} | — | October 11, 2007 | Catalina | CSS | BAR | 1.7 km | MPC · JPL |
| 388679 | 2007 UG_{12} | — | October 18, 2007 | Kitt Peak | Spacewatch | · | 2.7 km | MPC · JPL |
| 388680 | 2007 UV_{49} | — | October 24, 2007 | Mount Lemmon | Mount Lemmon Survey | · | 2.2 km | MPC · JPL |
| 388681 | 2007 UX_{56} | — | October 30, 2007 | Mount Lemmon | Mount Lemmon Survey | KOR | 1.2 km | MPC · JPL |
| 388682 | 2007 UX_{60} | — | September 18, 2007 | Mount Lemmon | Mount Lemmon Survey | · | 2.3 km | MPC · JPL |
| 388683 | 2007 UN_{78} | — | October 10, 2007 | Kitt Peak | Spacewatch | · | 1.9 km | MPC · JPL |
| 388684 | 2007 UN_{82} | — | October 30, 2007 | Kitt Peak | Spacewatch | · | 1.7 km | MPC · JPL |
| 388685 | 2007 UM_{83} | — | October 30, 2007 | Kitt Peak | Spacewatch | · | 2.0 km | MPC · JPL |
| 388686 | 2007 UH_{85} | — | October 30, 2007 | Kitt Peak | Spacewatch | · | 2.3 km | MPC · JPL |
| 388687 | 2007 UT_{92} | — | October 31, 2007 | Mount Lemmon | Mount Lemmon Survey | KOR | 1.3 km | MPC · JPL |
| 388688 | 2007 UP_{103} | — | October 30, 2007 | Kitt Peak | Spacewatch | · | 3.0 km | MPC · JPL |
| 388689 | 2007 UG_{110} | — | October 30, 2007 | Mount Lemmon | Mount Lemmon Survey | · | 1.4 km | MPC · JPL |
| 388690 | 2007 UO_{126} | — | October 19, 2007 | Mount Lemmon | Mount Lemmon Survey | HYG | 3.3 km | MPC · JPL |
| 388691 | 2007 UH_{129} | — | October 20, 2007 | Mount Lemmon | Mount Lemmon Survey | · | 2.2 km | MPC · JPL |
| 388692 | 2007 UN_{130} | — | October 19, 2007 | Mount Lemmon | Mount Lemmon Survey | · | 1.9 km | MPC · JPL |
| 388693 | 2007 UE_{133} | — | October 21, 2007 | Mount Lemmon | Mount Lemmon Survey | EOS | 1.8 km | MPC · JPL |
| 388694 | 2007 UR_{134} | — | October 17, 2007 | Mount Lemmon | Mount Lemmon Survey | · | 2.4 km | MPC · JPL |
| 388695 | 2007 UY_{136} | — | October 25, 2007 | Mount Lemmon | Mount Lemmon Survey | · | 2.7 km | MPC · JPL |
| 388696 | 2007 UH_{139} | — | October 21, 2007 | Mount Lemmon | Mount Lemmon Survey | · | 3.0 km | MPC · JPL |
| 388697 | 2007 UX_{140} | — | October 20, 2007 | Mount Lemmon | Mount Lemmon Survey | · | 2.4 km | MPC · JPL |
| 388698 | 2007 VJ_{7} | — | November 2, 2007 | Eskridge | G. Hug | · | 1.8 km | MPC · JPL |
| 388699 | 2007 VZ_{33} | — | November 2, 2007 | Kitt Peak | Spacewatch | TEL | 1.4 km | MPC · JPL |
| 388700 | 2007 VF_{35} | — | November 3, 2007 | 7300 | W. K. Y. Yeung | · | 3.3 km | MPC · JPL |

== 388701–388800 ==
back to top

| Designation | | | Discovery | | | Properties | | Ref |
| Permanent | Provisional | Named after | Date | Site | Discoverer(s) | Category | Diam. | Ref |
|---|---|---|---|---|---|---|---|---|
| 388701 | 2007 VU_{41} | — | November 3, 2007 | Mount Lemmon | Mount Lemmon Survey | KOR | 1.3 km | MPC · JPL |
| 388702 | 2007 VO_{48} | — | November 1, 2007 | Kitt Peak | Spacewatch | HOF | 2.8 km | MPC · JPL |
| 388703 | 2007 VH_{52} | — | November 1, 2007 | Kitt Peak | Spacewatch | EOS | 4.6 km | MPC · JPL |
| 388704 | 2007 VO_{63} | — | October 14, 2007 | Mount Lemmon | Mount Lemmon Survey | EOS | 2.3 km | MPC · JPL |
| 388705 | 2007 VM_{64} | — | November 1, 2007 | Kitt Peak | Spacewatch | · | 1.7 km | MPC · JPL |
| 388706 | 2007 VO_{64} | — | November 1, 2007 | Kitt Peak | Spacewatch | EOS | 2.2 km | MPC · JPL |
| 388707 | 2007 VR_{80} | — | November 4, 2007 | Kitt Peak | Spacewatch | · | 2.1 km | MPC · JPL |
| 388708 | 2007 VV_{84} | — | November 8, 2007 | La Sagra | OAM | · | 2.2 km | MPC · JPL |
| 388709 | 2007 VO_{99} | — | November 2, 2007 | Kitt Peak | Spacewatch | · | 2.9 km | MPC · JPL |
| 388710 | 2007 VU_{100} | — | November 2, 2007 | Kitt Peak | Spacewatch | · | 2.2 km | MPC · JPL |
| 388711 | 2007 VS_{109} | — | October 16, 2007 | Mount Lemmon | Mount Lemmon Survey | · | 1.9 km | MPC · JPL |
| 388712 | 2007 VN_{110} | — | November 3, 2007 | Kitt Peak | Spacewatch | KOR | 1.1 km | MPC · JPL |
| 388713 | 2007 VE_{111} | — | November 3, 2007 | Kitt Peak | Spacewatch | · | 1.6 km | MPC · JPL |
| 388714 | 2007 VC_{115} | — | November 3, 2007 | Kitt Peak | Spacewatch | KOR | 1.4 km | MPC · JPL |
| 388715 | 2007 VO_{130} | — | April 2, 2005 | Mount Lemmon | Mount Lemmon Survey | HOF | 2.7 km | MPC · JPL |
| 388716 | 2007 VH_{139} | — | November 3, 2007 | Kitt Peak | Spacewatch | · | 1.6 km | MPC · JPL |
| 388717 | 2007 VO_{143} | — | November 4, 2007 | Kitt Peak | Spacewatch | · | 640 m | MPC · JPL |
| 388718 | 2007 VU_{143} | — | November 4, 2007 | Kitt Peak | Spacewatch | · | 2.3 km | MPC · JPL |
| 388719 | 2007 VE_{147} | — | November 4, 2007 | Kitt Peak | Spacewatch | · | 2.3 km | MPC · JPL |
| 388720 | 2007 VD_{158} | — | November 5, 2007 | Kitt Peak | Spacewatch | · | 2.2 km | MPC · JPL |
| 388721 | 2007 VW_{158} | — | November 5, 2007 | Kitt Peak | Spacewatch | EOS | 2.0 km | MPC · JPL |
| 388722 | 2007 VX_{167} | — | November 5, 2007 | Kitt Peak | Spacewatch | · | 3.3 km | MPC · JPL |
| 388723 | 2007 VQ_{175} | — | November 4, 2007 | Mount Lemmon | Mount Lemmon Survey | · | 1.9 km | MPC · JPL |
| 388724 | 2007 VX_{191} | — | November 4, 2007 | Mount Lemmon | Mount Lemmon Survey | THM | 2.2 km | MPC · JPL |
| 388725 | 2007 VJ_{192} | — | November 4, 2007 | Mount Lemmon | Mount Lemmon Survey | · | 2.3 km | MPC · JPL |
| 388726 | 2007 VS_{204} | — | October 30, 2007 | Mount Lemmon | Mount Lemmon Survey | · | 1.5 km | MPC · JPL |
| 388727 | 2007 VH_{217} | — | November 9, 2007 | Kitt Peak | Spacewatch | KOR | 1.3 km | MPC · JPL |
| 388728 | 2007 VC_{223} | — | October 19, 2006 | Kitt Peak | Deep Ecliptic Survey | · | 2.3 km | MPC · JPL |
| 388729 | 2007 VQ_{234} | — | November 9, 2007 | Kitt Peak | Spacewatch | · | 2.1 km | MPC · JPL |
| 388730 | 2007 VF_{237} | — | November 11, 2007 | Mount Lemmon | Mount Lemmon Survey | · | 2.1 km | MPC · JPL |
| 388731 | 2007 VY_{242} | — | November 13, 2007 | Mount Lemmon | Mount Lemmon Survey | KOR | 1.1 km | MPC · JPL |
| 388732 | 2007 VX_{250} | — | October 9, 2007 | Kitt Peak | Spacewatch | · | 2.7 km | MPC · JPL |
| 388733 | 2007 VH_{254} | — | November 2, 2007 | Mount Lemmon | Mount Lemmon Survey | · | 2.2 km | MPC · JPL |
| 388734 | 2007 VF_{261} | — | November 13, 2007 | Kitt Peak | Spacewatch | · | 2.3 km | MPC · JPL |
| 388735 | 2007 VU_{262} | — | November 13, 2007 | Mount Lemmon | Mount Lemmon Survey | (13314) | 2.8 km | MPC · JPL |
| 388736 | 2007 VA_{267} | — | November 11, 2007 | Cerro Burek | Burek, Cerro | · | 3.1 km | MPC · JPL |
| 388737 | 2007 VS_{270} | — | November 14, 2007 | Kitt Peak | Spacewatch | HOF · fast | 3.0 km | MPC · JPL |
| 388738 | 2007 VK_{281} | — | November 14, 2007 | Kitt Peak | Spacewatch | · | 2.1 km | MPC · JPL |
| 388739 | 2007 VC_{291} | — | November 14, 2007 | Kitt Peak | Spacewatch | · | 2.1 km | MPC · JPL |
| 388740 | 2007 VY_{306} | — | November 2, 2007 | Mount Lemmon | Mount Lemmon Survey | · | 2.6 km | MPC · JPL |
| 388741 | 2007 VH_{308} | — | November 5, 2007 | Mount Lemmon | Mount Lemmon Survey | · | 3.1 km | MPC · JPL |
| 388742 | 2007 VU_{308} | — | November 8, 2007 | Kitt Peak | Spacewatch | · | 2.3 km | MPC · JPL |
| 388743 | 2007 VX_{309} | — | November 4, 2007 | Mount Lemmon | Mount Lemmon Survey | EOS | 2.1 km | MPC · JPL |
| 388744 | 2007 VV_{318} | — | November 1, 2007 | Kitt Peak | Spacewatch | · | 2.3 km | MPC · JPL |
| 388745 | 2007 VS_{331} | — | November 7, 2007 | Kitt Peak | Spacewatch | · | 2.5 km | MPC · JPL |
| 388746 | 2007 VO_{334} | — | November 14, 2007 | Kitt Peak | Spacewatch | GEF | 1.3 km | MPC · JPL |
| 388747 | 2007 VQ_{334} | — | April 2, 2005 | Kitt Peak | Spacewatch | AGN | 1.4 km | MPC · JPL |
| 388748 | 2007 VM_{335} | — | November 11, 2007 | Mount Lemmon | Mount Lemmon Survey | · | 3.3 km | MPC · JPL |
| 388749 | 2007 WU | — | November 17, 2007 | La Sagra | OAM | EOS | 3.8 km | MPC · JPL |
| 388750 | 2007 WS_{3} | — | November 18, 2007 | Mount Lemmon | Mount Lemmon Survey | T_{j} (2.93) | 4.2 km | MPC · JPL |
| 388751 | 2007 WO_{5} | — | November 16, 2007 | Socorro | LINEAR | · | 2.1 km | MPC · JPL |
| 388752 | 2007 WE_{6} | — | October 24, 2007 | Mount Lemmon | Mount Lemmon Survey | · | 2.7 km | MPC · JPL |
| 388753 | 2007 WN_{22} | — | November 17, 2007 | Kitt Peak | Spacewatch | GEF | 1.4 km | MPC · JPL |
| 388754 | 2007 WG_{23} | — | November 18, 2007 | Mount Lemmon | Mount Lemmon Survey | · | 2.0 km | MPC · JPL |
| 388755 | 2007 WU_{28} | — | November 19, 2007 | Kitt Peak | Spacewatch | · | 2.0 km | MPC · JPL |
| 388756 | 2007 WL_{44} | — | November 8, 2007 | Catalina | CSS | · | 2.0 km | MPC · JPL |
| 388757 | 2007 WT_{55} | — | November 29, 2007 | Lulin | LUSS | · | 2.9 km | MPC · JPL |
| 388758 | 2007 XM_{19} | — | December 12, 2007 | Socorro | LINEAR | · | 2.4 km | MPC · JPL |
| 388759 | 2007 XD_{21} | — | December 13, 2007 | Pla D'Arguines | R. Ferrando | · | 2.0 km | MPC · JPL |
| 388760 | 2007 XC_{29} | — | December 15, 2007 | Catalina | CSS | · | 2.4 km | MPC · JPL |
| 388761 | 2007 XX_{29} | — | November 13, 2007 | Mount Lemmon | Mount Lemmon Survey | · | 2.3 km | MPC · JPL |
| 388762 | 2007 XF_{49} | — | November 5, 2007 | Mount Lemmon | Mount Lemmon Survey | THM | 2.1 km | MPC · JPL |
| 388763 | 2007 XD_{50} | — | December 15, 2007 | Kitt Peak | Spacewatch | EOS | 2.2 km | MPC · JPL |
| 388764 | 2007 XQ_{53} | — | December 14, 2007 | Mount Lemmon | Mount Lemmon Survey | · | 2.8 km | MPC · JPL |
| 388765 | 2007 XC_{54} | — | December 3, 2007 | Kitt Peak | Spacewatch | · | 2.7 km | MPC · JPL |
| 388766 | 2007 XT_{55} | — | November 2, 2007 | Mount Lemmon | Mount Lemmon Survey | · | 3.8 km | MPC · JPL |
| 388767 | 2007 XV_{58} | — | December 14, 2007 | Mount Lemmon | Mount Lemmon Survey | · | 2.5 km | MPC · JPL |
| 388768 | 2007 YO_{5} | — | December 16, 2007 | Kitt Peak | Spacewatch | · | 2.1 km | MPC · JPL |
| 388769 | 2007 YT_{23} | — | December 5, 2007 | Kitt Peak | Spacewatch | · | 2.1 km | MPC · JPL |
| 388770 | 2007 YX_{27} | — | December 18, 2007 | Kitt Peak | Spacewatch | · | 3.3 km | MPC · JPL |
| 388771 | 2007 YY_{30} | — | November 9, 2007 | Kitt Peak | Spacewatch | · | 1.8 km | MPC · JPL |
| 388772 | 2007 YK_{35} | — | December 30, 2007 | Mount Lemmon | Mount Lemmon Survey | EOS | 2.2 km | MPC · JPL |
| 388773 | 2007 YR_{39} | — | December 30, 2007 | Mount Lemmon | Mount Lemmon Survey | · | 3.1 km | MPC · JPL |
| 388774 | 2007 YF_{45} | — | December 30, 2007 | Mount Lemmon | Mount Lemmon Survey | EOS | 2.2 km | MPC · JPL |
| 388775 | 2007 YF_{52} | — | November 12, 2007 | Catalina | CSS | · | 2.6 km | MPC · JPL |
| 388776 | 2007 YX_{55} | — | December 31, 2007 | Kitt Peak | Spacewatch | · | 3.4 km | MPC · JPL |
| 388777 | 2007 YW_{58} | — | December 31, 2007 | Catalina | CSS | TIR | 3.5 km | MPC · JPL |
| 388778 | 2007 YE_{64} | — | December 31, 2007 | Mount Lemmon | Mount Lemmon Survey | · | 2.6 km | MPC · JPL |
| 388779 | 2007 YA_{72} | — | December 21, 2007 | Mount Lemmon | Mount Lemmon Survey | EOS | 2.6 km | MPC · JPL |
| 388780 | 2008 AQ_{22} | — | January 10, 2008 | Mount Lemmon | Mount Lemmon Survey | · | 3.4 km | MPC · JPL |
| 388781 | 2008 AC_{25} | — | January 10, 2008 | Mount Lemmon | Mount Lemmon Survey | · | 4.7 km | MPC · JPL |
| 388782 | 2008 AM_{30} | — | January 11, 2008 | Desert Eagle | W. K. Y. Yeung | TIR | 3.1 km | MPC · JPL |
| 388783 | 2008 AZ_{32} | — | October 19, 2007 | Mount Lemmon | Mount Lemmon Survey | · | 3.1 km | MPC · JPL |
| 388784 | 2008 AT_{34} | — | December 30, 2007 | Kitt Peak | Spacewatch | · | 5.2 km | MPC · JPL |
| 388785 | 2008 AQ_{40} | — | January 10, 2008 | Mount Lemmon | Mount Lemmon Survey | (43176) | 3.4 km | MPC · JPL |
| 388786 | 2008 AL_{42} | — | January 10, 2008 | Mount Lemmon | Mount Lemmon Survey | URS | 2.8 km | MPC · JPL |
| 388787 | 2008 AM_{47} | — | December 3, 2007 | Kitt Peak | Spacewatch | · | 3.4 km | MPC · JPL |
| 388788 | 2008 AY_{77} | — | January 12, 2008 | Mount Lemmon | Mount Lemmon Survey | · | 2.5 km | MPC · JPL |
| 388789 | 2008 AA_{82} | — | January 13, 2008 | Mount Lemmon | Mount Lemmon Survey | · | 2.4 km | MPC · JPL |
| 388790 | 2008 AD_{87} | — | November 3, 2007 | Mount Lemmon | Mount Lemmon Survey | · | 3.2 km | MPC · JPL |
| 388791 | 2008 AA_{97} | — | January 14, 2008 | Kitt Peak | Spacewatch | · | 3.1 km | MPC · JPL |
| 388792 | 2008 AT_{97} | — | January 14, 2008 | Kitt Peak | Spacewatch | · | 2.8 km | MPC · JPL |
| 388793 | 2008 AW_{105} | — | January 15, 2008 | Mount Lemmon | Mount Lemmon Survey | · | 2.9 km | MPC · JPL |
| 388794 | 2008 AL_{114} | — | January 11, 2008 | Mount Lemmon | Mount Lemmon Survey | · | 3.0 km | MPC · JPL |
| 388795 | 2008 AB_{117} | — | January 1, 2008 | Kitt Peak | Spacewatch | · | 3.0 km | MPC · JPL |
| 388796 | 2008 AY_{128} | — | January 10, 2008 | Mount Lemmon | Mount Lemmon Survey | · | 2.5 km | MPC · JPL |
| 388797 | 2008 AE_{138} | — | January 15, 2008 | Mount Lemmon | Mount Lemmon Survey | EOS | 2.6 km | MPC · JPL |
| 388798 | 2008 BU_{2} | — | January 19, 2008 | Mount Lemmon | Mount Lemmon Survey | APO | 730 m | MPC · JPL |
| 388799 | 2008 BT_{4} | — | December 18, 2007 | Mount Lemmon | Mount Lemmon Survey | VER | 2.6 km | MPC · JPL |
| 388800 | 2008 BY_{5} | — | January 16, 2008 | Kitt Peak | Spacewatch | · | 3.0 km | MPC · JPL |

== 388801–388900 ==
back to top

| Designation | | | Discovery | | | Properties | | Ref |
| Permanent | Provisional | Named after | Date | Site | Discoverer(s) | Category | Diam. | Ref |
|---|---|---|---|---|---|---|---|---|
| 388801 | 2008 BK_{7} | — | January 16, 2008 | Kitt Peak | Spacewatch | · | 3.1 km | MPC · JPL |
| 388802 | 2008 BA_{11} | — | January 18, 2008 | Kitt Peak | Spacewatch | EOS | 2.5 km | MPC · JPL |
| 388803 | 2008 BJ_{14} | — | March 23, 2003 | Kitt Peak | Spacewatch | · | 3.2 km | MPC · JPL |
| 388804 | 2008 BQ_{14} | — | December 31, 2007 | Kitt Peak | Spacewatch | · | 2.6 km | MPC · JPL |
| 388805 | 2008 BR_{21} | — | January 30, 2008 | Mount Lemmon | Mount Lemmon Survey | · | 3.6 km | MPC · JPL |
| 388806 | 2008 BT_{24} | — | January 30, 2008 | La Sagra | OAM | (7605) | 5.8 km | MPC · JPL |
| 388807 | 2008 BY_{24} | — | December 15, 2007 | Kitt Peak | Spacewatch | · | 3.2 km | MPC · JPL |
| 388808 | 2008 BC_{28} | — | January 30, 2008 | Mount Lemmon | Mount Lemmon Survey | THM | 2.1 km | MPC · JPL |
| 388809 | 2008 BX_{39} | — | January 30, 2008 | Catalina | CSS | · | 4.9 km | MPC · JPL |
| 388810 | 2008 BN_{41} | — | January 10, 2008 | Mount Lemmon | Mount Lemmon Survey | · | 3.4 km | MPC · JPL |
| 388811 | 2008 BE_{48} | — | January 16, 2008 | Kitt Peak | Spacewatch | · | 4.5 km | MPC · JPL |
| 388812 | 2008 BP_{52} | — | January 30, 2008 | Catalina | CSS | · | 3.5 km | MPC · JPL |
| 388813 | 2008 CF_{1} | — | February 3, 2008 | Altschwendt | W. Ries | · | 4.3 km | MPC · JPL |
| 388814 | 2008 CP_{9} | — | January 11, 2008 | Kitt Peak | Spacewatch | (1118) | 3.4 km | MPC · JPL |
| 388815 | 2008 CB_{12} | — | February 3, 2008 | Kitt Peak | Spacewatch | · | 3.0 km | MPC · JPL |
| 388816 | 2008 CB_{30} | — | February 2, 2008 | Kitt Peak | Spacewatch | · | 3.1 km | MPC · JPL |
| 388817 | 2008 CR_{65} | — | February 8, 2008 | Mount Lemmon | Mount Lemmon Survey | · | 5.1 km | MPC · JPL |
| 388818 | 2008 CO_{76} | — | February 6, 2008 | Catalina | CSS | · | 3.3 km | MPC · JPL |
| 388819 | 2008 CS_{76} | — | October 16, 2006 | Catalina | CSS | · | 4.1 km | MPC · JPL |
| 388820 | 2008 CX_{92} | — | February 8, 2008 | Kitt Peak | Spacewatch | · | 3.2 km | MPC · JPL |
| 388821 | 2008 CM_{101} | — | February 9, 2008 | Mount Lemmon | Mount Lemmon Survey | · | 2.7 km | MPC · JPL |
| 388822 | 2008 CS_{103} | — | February 9, 2008 | Kitt Peak | Spacewatch | · | 3.2 km | MPC · JPL |
| 388823 | 2008 CM_{106} | — | March 11, 2003 | Kitt Peak | Spacewatch | LIX | 4.1 km | MPC · JPL |
| 388824 | 2008 CO_{122} | — | February 7, 2008 | Kitt Peak | Spacewatch | · | 3.8 km | MPC · JPL |
| 388825 | 2008 CM_{135} | — | February 8, 2008 | Mount Lemmon | Mount Lemmon Survey | · | 3.7 km | MPC · JPL |
| 388826 | 2008 CU_{154} | — | February 9, 2008 | Kitt Peak | Spacewatch | · | 3.0 km | MPC · JPL |
| 388827 | 2008 CJ_{180} | — | August 19, 2006 | Kitt Peak | Spacewatch | · | 3.6 km | MPC · JPL |
| 388828 | 2008 CD_{207} | — | February 12, 2008 | Kitt Peak | Spacewatch | · | 2.6 km | MPC · JPL |
| 388829 | 2008 CD_{211} | — | February 3, 2008 | Catalina | CSS | EUP | 4.8 km | MPC · JPL |
| 388830 | 2008 DO_{1} | — | February 24, 2008 | Mount Lemmon | Mount Lemmon Survey | TIR | 3.1 km | MPC · JPL |
| 388831 | 2008 DB_{9} | — | January 15, 2008 | Mount Lemmon | Mount Lemmon Survey | · | 2.3 km | MPC · JPL |
| 388832 | 2008 DL_{9} | — | February 25, 2008 | Kitt Peak | Spacewatch | · | 2.9 km | MPC · JPL |
| 388833 | 2008 DG_{12} | — | February 26, 2008 | Kitt Peak | Spacewatch | · | 2.7 km | MPC · JPL |
| 388834 | 2008 DQ_{31} | — | February 27, 2008 | Kitt Peak | Spacewatch | · | 3.3 km | MPC · JPL |
| 388835 | 2008 DK_{54} | — | February 27, 2008 | Catalina | CSS | · | 5.8 km | MPC · JPL |
| 388836 | 2008 DY_{60} | — | March 27, 2003 | Kitt Peak | Spacewatch | · | 3.0 km | MPC · JPL |
| 388837 | 2008 DN_{66} | — | February 29, 2008 | Kitt Peak | Spacewatch | · | 5.5 km | MPC · JPL |
| 388838 | 2008 EZ_{5} | — | March 4, 2008 | Mount Lemmon | Mount Lemmon Survey | AMO | 380 m | MPC · JPL |
| 388839 | 2008 ES_{7} | — | March 6, 2008 | Kitt Peak | Spacewatch | · | 480 m | MPC · JPL |
| 388840 | 2008 EF_{19} | — | March 2, 2008 | Mount Lemmon | Mount Lemmon Survey | · | 3.3 km | MPC · JPL |
| 388841 | 2008 ES_{25} | — | March 4, 2008 | Kitt Peak | Spacewatch | · | 3.4 km | MPC · JPL |
| 388842 | 2008 EA_{73} | — | March 7, 2008 | Kitt Peak | Spacewatch | CYB | 4.5 km | MPC · JPL |
| 388843 | 2008 EO_{74} | — | March 7, 2008 | Kitt Peak | Spacewatch | · | 3.8 km | MPC · JPL |
| 388844 | 2008 EV_{92} | — | January 13, 2002 | Socorro | LINEAR | · | 3.4 km | MPC · JPL |
| 388845 | 2008 EC_{105} | — | March 6, 2008 | Mount Lemmon | Mount Lemmon Survey | · | 1.5 km | MPC · JPL |
| 388846 | 2008 EN_{110} | — | March 8, 2008 | Mount Lemmon | Mount Lemmon Survey | · | 3.0 km | MPC · JPL |
| 388847 | 2008 EY_{118} | — | March 9, 2008 | Mount Lemmon | Mount Lemmon Survey | · | 3.3 km | MPC · JPL |
| 388848 | 2008 FP_{4} | — | March 25, 2008 | Kitt Peak | Spacewatch | MIS | 2.4 km | MPC · JPL |
| 388849 | 2008 FL_{109} | — | March 31, 2008 | Mount Lemmon | Mount Lemmon Survey | · | 800 m | MPC · JPL |
| 388850 | 2008 FX_{113} | — | March 31, 2008 | Kitt Peak | Spacewatch | L5 | 9.3 km | MPC · JPL |
| 388851 | 2008 GC_{40} | — | April 4, 2008 | Mount Lemmon | Mount Lemmon Survey | · | 3.2 km | MPC · JPL |
| 388852 | 2008 GF_{49} | — | February 28, 2008 | Mount Lemmon | Mount Lemmon Survey | CYB | 3.6 km | MPC · JPL |
| 388853 | 2008 GR_{70} | — | April 7, 2008 | Kitt Peak | Spacewatch | T_{j} (2.97) | 3.1 km | MPC · JPL |
| 388854 | 2008 GS_{85} | — | April 9, 2008 | Kitt Peak | Spacewatch | · | 3.1 km | MPC · JPL |
| 388855 | 2008 GO_{100} | — | March 28, 2008 | Mount Lemmon | Mount Lemmon Survey | EOS | 2.1 km | MPC · JPL |
| 388856 | 2008 GD_{106} | — | April 11, 2008 | Mount Lemmon | Mount Lemmon Survey | CYB | 3.4 km | MPC · JPL |
| 388857 | 2008 GG_{137} | — | April 4, 2008 | Kitt Peak | Spacewatch | · | 700 m | MPC · JPL |
| 388858 | 2008 HH_{26} | — | April 27, 2008 | Kitt Peak | Spacewatch | · | 690 m | MPC · JPL |
| 388859 | 2008 JU_{29} | — | April 29, 2008 | Kitt Peak | Spacewatch | · | 500 m | MPC · JPL |
| 388860 | 2008 JU_{36} | — | May 7, 2008 | Kitt Peak | Spacewatch | · | 2.6 km | MPC · JPL |
| 388861 | 2008 OJ_{15} | — | July 28, 2008 | Mount Lemmon | Mount Lemmon Survey | · | 760 m | MPC · JPL |
| 388862 | 2008 OU_{18} | — | July 31, 2008 | Mount Lemmon | Mount Lemmon Survey | · | 770 m | MPC · JPL |
| 388863 | 2008 PV_{9} | — | August 7, 2008 | Hibiscus | S. F. Hönig, Teamo, N. | · | 1.7 km | MPC · JPL |
| 388864 | 2008 QH_{1} | — | July 30, 2008 | Kitt Peak | Spacewatch | · | 820 m | MPC · JPL |
| 388865 | 2008 QB_{3} | — | August 24, 2008 | Bisei SG Center | BATTeRS | PHO | 1.3 km | MPC · JPL |
| 388866 | 2008 QB_{11} | — | August 26, 2008 | La Sagra | OAM | · | 820 m | MPC · JPL |
| 388867 | 2008 QC_{13} | — | August 27, 2008 | La Sagra | OAM | · | 1.6 km | MPC · JPL |
| 388868 | 2008 QH_{20} | — | August 30, 2008 | Drebach | Drebach | · | 1.8 km | MPC · JPL |
| 388869 | 2008 QL_{36} | — | August 20, 2008 | Kitt Peak | Spacewatch | · | 1.7 km | MPC · JPL |
| 388870 | 2008 RN | — | September 2, 2008 | Pla D'Arguines | R. Ferrando | · | 1.2 km | MPC · JPL |
| 388871 | 2008 RC_{3} | — | September 2, 2008 | Kitt Peak | Spacewatch | · | 1.5 km | MPC · JPL |
| 388872 | 2008 RQ_{5} | — | September 2, 2008 | Kitt Peak | Spacewatch | · | 730 m | MPC · JPL |
| 388873 | 2008 RC_{18} | — | September 4, 2008 | Kitt Peak | Spacewatch | MAR | 1.1 km | MPC · JPL |
| 388874 | 2008 RB_{21} | — | September 4, 2008 | Kitt Peak | Spacewatch | L4 | 9.7 km | MPC · JPL |
| 388875 | 2008 RR_{21} | — | September 4, 2008 | Kitt Peak | Spacewatch | · | 700 m | MPC · JPL |
| 388876 | 2008 RE_{29} | — | September 2, 2008 | Kitt Peak | Spacewatch | L4 · 006 | 10 km | MPC · JPL |
| 388877 | 2008 RN_{33} | — | September 2, 2008 | Kitt Peak | Spacewatch | V | 690 m | MPC · JPL |
| 388878 | 2008 RP_{35} | — | September 2, 2008 | Kitt Peak | Spacewatch | (5) | 880 m | MPC · JPL |
| 388879 | 2008 RE_{56} | — | September 3, 2008 | Kitt Peak | Spacewatch | L4 | 9.2 km | MPC · JPL |
| 388880 | 2008 RT_{62} | — | September 4, 2008 | Kitt Peak | Spacewatch | · | 1.3 km | MPC · JPL |
| 388881 | 2008 RJ_{67} | — | September 4, 2008 | Kitt Peak | Spacewatch | (5) | 1.3 km | MPC · JPL |
| 388882 | 2008 RB_{84} | — | September 4, 2008 | Kitt Peak | Spacewatch | · | 630 m | MPC · JPL |
| 388883 | 2008 RO_{85} | — | September 5, 2008 | Kitt Peak | Spacewatch | · | 870 m | MPC · JPL |
| 388884 | 2008 RE_{91} | — | December 27, 2006 | Mount Lemmon | Mount Lemmon Survey | (1338) (FLO) | 710 m | MPC · JPL |
| 388885 | 2008 RG_{94} | — | September 6, 2008 | Kitt Peak | Spacewatch | V | 730 m | MPC · JPL |
| 388886 | 2008 RG_{103} | — | September 5, 2008 | Kitt Peak | Spacewatch | · | 1.4 km | MPC · JPL |
| 388887 | 2008 RL_{110} | — | September 3, 2008 | Kitt Peak | Spacewatch | L4 | 7.8 km | MPC · JPL |
| 388888 | 2008 RH_{120} | — | September 7, 2008 | Catalina | CSS | · | 2.3 km | MPC · JPL |
| 388889 | 2008 RZ_{123} | — | September 6, 2008 | Kitt Peak | Spacewatch | L4 | 7.9 km | MPC · JPL |
| 388890 | 2008 RL_{128} | — | September 7, 2008 | Mount Lemmon | Mount Lemmon Survey | · | 990 m | MPC · JPL |
| 388891 | 2008 RW_{128} | — | September 5, 2008 | Kitt Peak | Spacewatch | L4 | 7.6 km | MPC · JPL |
| 388892 | 2008 RV_{134} | — | September 9, 2008 | Siding Spring | SSS | · | 1.1 km | MPC · JPL |
| 388893 | 2008 RO_{137} | — | September 5, 2008 | Socorro | LINEAR | BRG | 1.6 km | MPC · JPL |
| 388894 | 2008 RV_{137} | — | September 5, 2008 | Kitt Peak | Spacewatch | (5) | 1.2 km | MPC · JPL |
| 388895 | 2008 SG_{1} | — | September 21, 2008 | Grove Creek | Tozzi, F. | · | 2.0 km | MPC · JPL |
| 388896 | 2008 SJ_{4} | — | September 22, 2008 | Socorro | LINEAR | · | 1.4 km | MPC · JPL |
| 388897 | 2008 SD_{6} | — | September 22, 2008 | Socorro | LINEAR | V | 930 m | MPC · JPL |
| 388898 | 2008 SM_{23} | — | September 19, 2008 | Kitt Peak | Spacewatch | L4 | 8.8 km | MPC · JPL |
| 388899 | 2008 SD_{28} | — | September 5, 2008 | Kitt Peak | Spacewatch | · | 2.1 km | MPC · JPL |
| 388900 | 2008 SU_{35} | — | September 20, 2008 | Kitt Peak | Spacewatch | · | 1.6 km | MPC · JPL |

== 388901–389000 ==
back to top

| Designation | | | Discovery | | | Properties | | Ref |
| Permanent | Provisional | Named after | Date | Site | Discoverer(s) | Category | Diam. | Ref |
|---|---|---|---|---|---|---|---|---|
| 388901 | 2008 SB_{38} | — | September 20, 2008 | Mount Lemmon | Mount Lemmon Survey | PHO | 2.5 km | MPC · JPL |
| 388902 | 2008 SL_{39} | — | September 20, 2008 | Kitt Peak | Spacewatch | · | 1.7 km | MPC · JPL |
| 388903 | 2008 SK_{50} | — | September 20, 2008 | Mount Lemmon | Mount Lemmon Survey | L4 · HEK | 12 km | MPC · JPL |
| 388904 | 2008 SR_{55} | — | September 20, 2008 | Mount Lemmon | Mount Lemmon Survey | · | 990 m | MPC · JPL |
| 388905 | 2008 SU_{66} | — | September 21, 2008 | Catalina | CSS | · | 1.2 km | MPC · JPL |
| 388906 | 2008 SC_{67} | — | September 21, 2008 | Mount Lemmon | Mount Lemmon Survey | · | 3.3 km | MPC · JPL |
| 388907 | 2008 SD_{70} | — | September 22, 2008 | Kitt Peak | Spacewatch | · | 1.2 km | MPC · JPL |
| 388908 | 2008 SU_{70} | — | September 22, 2008 | Mount Lemmon | Mount Lemmon Survey | · | 1.2 km | MPC · JPL |
| 388909 | 2008 SH_{81} | — | September 23, 2008 | Mount Lemmon | Mount Lemmon Survey | · | 1.1 km | MPC · JPL |
| 388910 | 2008 SP_{91} | — | August 22, 2004 | Kitt Peak | Spacewatch | · | 1.3 km | MPC · JPL |
| 388911 | 2008 SQ_{96} | — | September 21, 2008 | Kitt Peak | Spacewatch | (5) | 900 m | MPC · JPL |
| 388912 | 2008 SY_{96} | — | September 21, 2008 | Kitt Peak | Spacewatch | · | 1.6 km | MPC · JPL |
| 388913 | 2008 SZ_{110} | — | September 22, 2008 | Kitt Peak | Spacewatch | · | 1.2 km | MPC · JPL |
| 388914 | 2008 SR_{112} | — | September 22, 2008 | Kitt Peak | Spacewatch | · | 1.4 km | MPC · JPL |
| 388915 | 2008 SA_{115} | — | September 22, 2008 | Kitt Peak | Spacewatch | · | 830 m | MPC · JPL |
| 388916 | 2008 SK_{119} | — | September 22, 2008 | Mount Lemmon | Mount Lemmon Survey | MAS | 860 m | MPC · JPL |
| 388917 | 2008 SF_{120} | — | September 22, 2008 | Mount Lemmon | Mount Lemmon Survey | · | 2.7 km | MPC · JPL |
| 388918 | 2008 SB_{121} | — | September 22, 2008 | Mount Lemmon | Mount Lemmon Survey | · | 1 km | MPC · JPL |
| 388919 | 2008 SR_{123} | — | September 22, 2008 | Mount Lemmon | Mount Lemmon Survey | · | 1.4 km | MPC · JPL |
| 388920 | 2008 SW_{129} | — | September 22, 2008 | Kitt Peak | Spacewatch | V | 760 m | MPC · JPL |
| 388921 | 2008 SW_{136} | — | September 23, 2008 | Kitt Peak | Spacewatch | · | 1.5 km | MPC · JPL |
| 388922 | 2008 SJ_{140} | — | September 24, 2008 | Kitt Peak | Spacewatch | PHO | 880 m | MPC · JPL |
| 388923 | 2008 SU_{145} | — | September 21, 2008 | Catalina | CSS | · | 1.1 km | MPC · JPL |
| 388924 | 2008 SA_{154} | — | March 10, 2003 | Kitt Peak | Spacewatch | L4 | 10 km | MPC · JPL |
| 388925 | 2008 SN_{155} | — | September 23, 2008 | Socorro | LINEAR | · | 2.1 km | MPC · JPL |
| 388926 | 2008 SC_{156} | — | September 23, 2008 | Socorro | LINEAR | · | 2.2 km | MPC · JPL |
| 388927 | 2008 SY_{162} | — | September 3, 2008 | Kitt Peak | Spacewatch | NYS | 1.3 km | MPC · JPL |
| 388928 | 2008 ST_{175} | — | September 23, 2008 | Kitt Peak | Spacewatch | · | 1.2 km | MPC · JPL |
| 388929 | 2008 SH_{188} | — | September 25, 2008 | Kitt Peak | Spacewatch | · | 1.2 km | MPC · JPL |
| 388930 | 2008 SL_{188} | — | September 25, 2008 | Kitt Peak | Spacewatch | NYS | 1.3 km | MPC · JPL |
| 388931 | 2008 SS_{191} | — | September 25, 2008 | Kitt Peak | Spacewatch | · | 1.2 km | MPC · JPL |
| 388932 | 2008 SF_{193} | — | September 25, 2008 | Kitt Peak | Spacewatch | · | 1.2 km | MPC · JPL |
| 388933 | 2008 SZ_{203} | — | September 26, 2008 | Kitt Peak | Spacewatch | · | 1.1 km | MPC · JPL |
| 388934 | 2008 SC_{226} | — | September 26, 2008 | Kitt Peak | Spacewatch | · | 1.0 km | MPC · JPL |
| 388935 | 2008 SQ_{229} | — | September 28, 2008 | Mount Lemmon | Mount Lemmon Survey | L4 | 12 km | MPC · JPL |
| 388936 | 2008 SC_{237} | — | September 29, 2008 | Kitt Peak | Spacewatch | GEF | 980 m | MPC · JPL |
| 388937 | 2008 SH_{247} | — | September 22, 2008 | Kitt Peak | Spacewatch | V | 650 m | MPC · JPL |
| 388938 | 2008 SA_{256} | — | September 20, 2008 | Kitt Peak | Spacewatch | · | 1.4 km | MPC · JPL |
| 388939 | 2008 SL_{259} | — | September 23, 2008 | Mount Lemmon | Mount Lemmon Survey | · | 810 m | MPC · JPL |
| 388940 | 2008 SD_{260} | — | September 23, 2008 | Mount Lemmon | Mount Lemmon Survey | L4 | 9.0 km | MPC · JPL |
| 388941 | 2008 SJ_{273} | — | September 24, 2008 | Mount Lemmon | Mount Lemmon Survey | V | 880 m | MPC · JPL |
| 388942 | 2008 SL_{278} | — | September 20, 2008 | Kitt Peak | Spacewatch | · | 1.1 km | MPC · JPL |
| 388943 | 2008 ST_{282} | — | September 24, 2008 | Catalina | CSS | · | 2.3 km | MPC · JPL |
| 388944 | 2008 TR_{1} | — | October 1, 2008 | Great Shefford | Birtwhistle, P. | MAS | 760 m | MPC · JPL |
| 388945 | 2008 TZ_{3} | — | October 6, 2008 | Mount Lemmon | Mount Lemmon Survey | APO · PHA | 290 m | MPC · JPL |
| 388946 | 2008 TO_{4} | — | October 1, 2008 | La Sagra | OAM | · | 1.2 km | MPC · JPL |
| 388947 | 2008 TU_{4} | — | October 1, 2008 | La Sagra | OAM | · | 1.8 km | MPC · JPL |
| 388948 | 2008 TV_{17} | — | October 1, 2008 | Mount Lemmon | Mount Lemmon Survey | · | 1.1 km | MPC · JPL |
| 388949 | 2008 TA_{21} | — | October 1, 2008 | Mount Lemmon | Mount Lemmon Survey | MAS | 800 m | MPC · JPL |
| 388950 | 2008 TG_{22} | — | October 1, 2008 | Mount Lemmon | Mount Lemmon Survey | · | 1.2 km | MPC · JPL |
| 388951 | 2008 TN_{24} | — | October 2, 2008 | Catalina | CSS | ADE | 2.9 km | MPC · JPL |
| 388952 | 2008 TZ_{26} | — | October 8, 2008 | Andrushivka | Andrushivka | · | 1.5 km | MPC · JPL |
| 388953 | 2008 TA_{32} | — | October 1, 2008 | Kitt Peak | Spacewatch | (5) | 1.0 km | MPC · JPL |
| 388954 | 2008 TX_{37} | — | October 1, 2008 | Mount Lemmon | Mount Lemmon Survey | · | 1.2 km | MPC · JPL |
| 388955 | 2008 TW_{62} | — | September 22, 2008 | Mount Lemmon | Mount Lemmon Survey | · | 1.2 km | MPC · JPL |
| 388956 | 2008 TC_{72} | — | September 23, 2008 | Kitt Peak | Spacewatch | (5) | 1.2 km | MPC · JPL |
| 388957 | 2008 TW_{72} | — | September 23, 2008 | Mount Lemmon | Mount Lemmon Survey | · | 1.2 km | MPC · JPL |
| 388958 | 2008 TH_{75} | — | October 2, 2008 | Kitt Peak | Spacewatch | THM | 1.9 km | MPC · JPL |
| 388959 | 2008 TL_{83} | — | October 3, 2008 | Kitt Peak | Spacewatch | · | 2.3 km | MPC · JPL |
| 388960 | 2008 TC_{84} | — | October 3, 2008 | Kitt Peak | Spacewatch | MIS | 2.2 km | MPC · JPL |
| 388961 | 2008 TX_{85} | — | October 3, 2008 | Mount Lemmon | Mount Lemmon Survey | · | 1.0 km | MPC · JPL |
| 388962 | 2008 TG_{87} | — | October 3, 2008 | Kitt Peak | Spacewatch | (5) | 980 m | MPC · JPL |
| 388963 | 2008 TH_{88} | — | September 21, 2008 | Kitt Peak | Spacewatch | · | 1.4 km | MPC · JPL |
| 388964 | 2008 TJ_{88} | — | December 13, 2004 | Campo Imperatore | CINEOS | MRX | 1.1 km | MPC · JPL |
| 388965 | 2008 TP_{90} | — | October 3, 2008 | Kitt Peak | Spacewatch | · | 1.2 km | MPC · JPL |
| 388966 | 2008 TY_{93} | — | October 5, 2008 | La Sagra | OAM | · | 1.3 km | MPC · JPL |
| 388967 | 2008 TS_{100} | — | October 6, 2008 | Kitt Peak | Spacewatch | (5) | 840 m | MPC · JPL |
| 388968 | 2008 TK_{121} | — | September 7, 2008 | Catalina | CSS | BAR | 1.6 km | MPC · JPL |
| 388969 | 2008 TB_{124} | — | October 8, 2008 | Mount Lemmon | Mount Lemmon Survey | · | 1.3 km | MPC · JPL |
| 388970 | 2008 TL_{154} | — | October 9, 2008 | Mount Lemmon | Mount Lemmon Survey | · | 1.8 km | MPC · JPL |
| 388971 | 2008 TZ_{170} | — | October 9, 2008 | Mount Lemmon | Mount Lemmon Survey | · | 900 m | MPC · JPL |
| 388972 | 2008 TH_{173} | — | October 2, 2008 | Kitt Peak | Spacewatch | L4 | 8.1 km | MPC · JPL |
| 388973 | 2008 TA_{177} | — | October 1, 2008 | Kitt Peak | Spacewatch | · | 1.4 km | MPC · JPL |
| 388974 | 2008 UQ_{13} | — | September 3, 2008 | Kitt Peak | Spacewatch | · | 1.5 km | MPC · JPL |
| 388975 | 2008 UW_{24} | — | September 25, 2008 | Kitt Peak | Spacewatch | · | 1.2 km | MPC · JPL |
| 388976 | 2008 UB_{27} | — | October 20, 2008 | Kitt Peak | Spacewatch | MAR | 940 m | MPC · JPL |
| 388977 | 2008 UB_{28} | — | October 20, 2008 | Kitt Peak | Spacewatch | · | 840 m | MPC · JPL |
| 388978 | 2008 UP_{29} | — | October 20, 2008 | Kitt Peak | Spacewatch | MAS | 720 m | MPC · JPL |
| 388979 | 2008 UK_{35} | — | October 20, 2008 | Mount Lemmon | Mount Lemmon Survey | · | 860 m | MPC · JPL |
| 388980 | 2008 UV_{52} | — | October 20, 2008 | Mount Lemmon | Mount Lemmon Survey | · | 1.7 km | MPC · JPL |
| 388981 | 2008 UK_{54} | — | October 20, 2008 | Mount Lemmon | Mount Lemmon Survey | · | 1.6 km | MPC · JPL |
| 388982 | 2008 UJ_{56} | — | October 21, 2008 | Kitt Peak | Spacewatch | V | 820 m | MPC · JPL |
| 388983 | 2008 UZ_{60} | — | October 21, 2008 | Kitt Peak | Spacewatch | · | 2.8 km | MPC · JPL |
| 388984 | 2008 UE_{63} | — | October 21, 2008 | Kitt Peak | Spacewatch | · | 2.5 km | MPC · JPL |
| 388985 | 2008 UL_{64} | — | September 26, 2008 | Kitt Peak | Spacewatch | · | 1.1 km | MPC · JPL |
| 388986 | 2008 UW_{64} | — | October 21, 2008 | Kitt Peak | Spacewatch | · | 1.3 km | MPC · JPL |
| 388987 | 2008 UG_{72} | — | October 21, 2008 | Mount Lemmon | Mount Lemmon Survey | MAR | 1.6 km | MPC · JPL |
| 388988 | 2008 UG_{77} | — | October 3, 2008 | Mount Lemmon | Mount Lemmon Survey | · | 2.2 km | MPC · JPL |
| 388989 | 2008 UR_{78} | — | October 1, 2008 | Kitt Peak | Spacewatch | HOF | 2.7 km | MPC · JPL |
| 388990 | 2008 UX_{84} | — | September 24, 2008 | Kitt Peak | Spacewatch | · | 870 m | MPC · JPL |
| 388991 | 2008 UV_{87} | — | October 24, 2008 | Kitt Peak | Spacewatch | (5) | 1.1 km | MPC · JPL |
| 388992 | 2008 UY_{87} | — | October 24, 2008 | Kitt Peak | Spacewatch | (5) | 1.2 km | MPC · JPL |
| 388993 | 2008 UZ_{87} | — | October 24, 2008 | Kitt Peak | Spacewatch | V | 650 m | MPC · JPL |
| 388994 | 2008 UD_{91} | — | September 6, 2008 | Catalina | CSS | · | 2.5 km | MPC · JPL |
| 388995 | 2008 UL_{96} | — | September 29, 2008 | Catalina | CSS | ERI | 1.5 km | MPC · JPL |
| 388996 | 2008 UU_{96} | — | October 25, 2008 | Socorro | LINEAR | AEO | 1.4 km | MPC · JPL |
| 388997 | 2008 UW_{106} | — | October 21, 2008 | Kitt Peak | Spacewatch | EUN | 1.2 km | MPC · JPL |
| 388998 | 2008 UK_{107} | — | October 21, 2008 | Kitt Peak | Spacewatch | · | 2.5 km | MPC · JPL |
| 388999 | 2008 US_{123} | — | October 22, 2008 | Kitt Peak | Spacewatch | · | 1.3 km | MPC · JPL |
| 389000 | 2008 UW_{141} | — | September 22, 2008 | Mount Lemmon | Mount Lemmon Survey | V | 850 m | MPC · JPL |

back to top

== See also ==
- Meanings of minor-planet names: 388001–389000
