= List of minor planets: 389001–390000 =

The following is a partial list of minor planets, running from minor-planet number 389001 through 390000, inclusive. The primary data for this and other partial lists is based on JPL's "Small-Body Orbital Elements" and data available from the Minor Planet Center. Critical list information is also provided by the MPC, unless otherwise specified from Lowell Observatory. A detailed description of the table's columns and additional sources are given on the main page including a complete list of every page in this series, and a statistical break-up on the dynamical classification of minor planets.

Also see the summary list of all named bodies in numerical and alphabetical order, and the corresponding naming citations for the number range of this particular list. New namings may only be added to this list after official publication, as the preannouncement of names is condemned by the Working Group for Small Bodies Nomenclature of the International Astronomical Union.

Near-Earth obj.	MBA (inner)	MBA (outer)	Centaur
Mars-crosser	MBA (middle)	Jupiter trojan	Trans-Neptunian obj.
Unclassified

== 389001–389100 ==
Designation			Discovery			Properties		Ref
Permanent	Provisional	Named after	Date	Site	Discoverer(s)	Category	Diam.	Ref
389001	2008 UT_{144}	—	October 23, 2008	Kitt Peak	Spacewatch	·	1.4 km	MPC · JPL
389002	2008 UH_{148}	—	October 23, 2008	Kitt Peak	Spacewatch	·	1.4 km	MPC · JPL
389003	2008 UJ_{148}	—	March 20, 2007	Kitt Peak	Spacewatch	·	850 m	MPC · JPL
389004	2008 UT_{161}	—	October 24, 2008	Kitt Peak	Spacewatch	(5)	860 m	MPC · JPL
389005	2008 UP_{168}	—	October 24, 2008	Kitt Peak	Spacewatch	·	1.7 km	MPC · JPL
389006	2008 UZ_{168}	—	October 24, 2008	Kitt Peak	Spacewatch	·	2.0 km	MPC · JPL
389007	2008 UM_{175}	—	October 24, 2008	Mount Lemmon	Mount Lemmon Survey	·	1.9 km	MPC · JPL
389008	2008 UL_{176}	—	October 24, 2008	Mount Lemmon	Mount Lemmon Survey	(5)	1.1 km	MPC · JPL
389009	2008 UQ_{177}	—	October 9, 2008	Kitt Peak	Spacewatch	·	1.1 km	MPC · JPL
389010	2008 UG_{180}	—	October 24, 2008	Kitt Peak	Spacewatch	·	1.5 km	MPC · JPL
389011	2008 UZ_{187}	—	October 24, 2008	Kitt Peak	Spacewatch	·	1.3 km	MPC · JPL
389012	2008 UH_{191}	—	October 25, 2008	Mount Lemmon	Mount Lemmon Survey	·	1.5 km	MPC · JPL
389013	2008 UF_{204}	—	October 22, 2008	Kitt Peak	Spacewatch	·	1.1 km	MPC · JPL
389014	2008 UL_{206}	—	September 25, 2008	Kitt Peak	Spacewatch	EUN	1.3 km	MPC · JPL
389015	2008 UN_{207}	—	October 23, 2008	Kitt Peak	Spacewatch	·	1.7 km	MPC · JPL
389016	2008 UW_{215}	—	October 24, 2008	Kitt Peak	Spacewatch	·	940 m	MPC · JPL
389017	2008 UG_{224}	—	October 25, 2008	Kitt Peak	Spacewatch	·	1.7 km	MPC · JPL
389018	2008 UR_{225}	—	October 25, 2008	Mount Lemmon	Mount Lemmon Survey	(5)	1.3 km	MPC · JPL
389019	2008 UX_{225}	—	October 25, 2008	Catalina	CSS	·	3.4 km	MPC · JPL
389020	2008 UR_{227}	—	October 21, 2008	Kitt Peak	Spacewatch	·	1.6 km	MPC · JPL
389021	2008 UC_{238}	—	September 28, 2008	Mount Lemmon	Mount Lemmon Survey	·	1.2 km	MPC · JPL
389022	2008 UC_{239}	—	October 26, 2008	Mount Lemmon	Mount Lemmon Survey	·	1.5 km	MPC · JPL
389023	2008 UH_{255}	—	October 27, 2008	Kitt Peak	Spacewatch	·	1.4 km	MPC · JPL
389024	2008 UK_{274}	—	October 28, 2008	Kitt Peak	Spacewatch	·	1.1 km	MPC · JPL
389025	2008 UM_{282}	—	October 28, 2008	Kitt Peak	Spacewatch	·	1.5 km	MPC · JPL
389026	2008 UP_{316}	—	October 30, 2008	Kitt Peak	Spacewatch	·	1.3 km	MPC · JPL
389027	2008 UF_{318}	—	October 31, 2008	Mount Lemmon	Mount Lemmon Survey	BRG	1.5 km	MPC · JPL
389028	2008 UE_{319}	—	September 24, 2008	Kitt Peak	Spacewatch	·	1.0 km	MPC · JPL
389029	2008 UF_{322}	—	October 8, 2008	Mount Lemmon	Mount Lemmon Survey	(5)	1.3 km	MPC · JPL
389030	2008 UH_{322}	—	October 31, 2008	Mount Lemmon	Mount Lemmon Survey	RAF	810 m	MPC · JPL
389031	2008 UT_{323}	—	October 31, 2008	Catalina	CSS	JUN	1.2 km	MPC · JPL
389032	2008 UH_{325}	—	October 31, 2008	Kitt Peak	Spacewatch	·	1.4 km	MPC · JPL
389033	2008 UN_{344}	—	October 30, 2008	Kitt Peak	Spacewatch	·	1.5 km	MPC · JPL
389034	2008 UZ_{348}	—	October 26, 2008	Kitt Peak	Spacewatch	·	1.2 km	MPC · JPL
389035	2008 UN_{354}	—	October 27, 2008	Mount Lemmon	Mount Lemmon Survey	·	1.3 km	MPC · JPL
389036	2008 UH_{355}	—	October 21, 2008	Mount Lemmon	Mount Lemmon Survey	·	1.2 km	MPC · JPL
389037	2008 UM_{355}	—	October 24, 2008	Catalina	CSS	·	1.6 km	MPC · JPL
389038	2008 US_{355}	—	October 26, 2008	Mount Lemmon	Mount Lemmon Survey	·	1.5 km	MPC · JPL
389039	2008 UU_{359}	—	October 28, 2008	Kitt Peak	Spacewatch	·	1.1 km	MPC · JPL
389040	2008 UD_{360}	—	October 29, 2008	Kitt Peak	Spacewatch	·	1.4 km	MPC · JPL
389041	2008 UE_{364}	—	October 26, 2008	Catalina	CSS	·	1.2 km	MPC · JPL
389042	2008 UD_{368}	—	January 6, 2005	Catalina	CSS	·	1.2 km	MPC · JPL
389043	2008 UA_{370}	—	October 26, 2008	Mount Lemmon	Mount Lemmon Survey	·	1.8 km	MPC · JPL
389044	2008 UA_{371}	—	October 25, 2008	Mount Lemmon	Mount Lemmon Survey	·	1.4 km	MPC · JPL
389045	2008 VO_{2}	—	November 2, 2008	Socorro	LINEAR	·	4.1 km	MPC · JPL
389046	2008 VW_{6}	—	November 1, 2008	Mount Lemmon	Mount Lemmon Survey	·	1.4 km	MPC · JPL
389047	2008 VY_{35}	—	November 2, 2008	Kitt Peak	Spacewatch	EUN	2.2 km	MPC · JPL
389048	2008 VY_{38}	—	November 2, 2008	Catalina	CSS	·	1.7 km	MPC · JPL
389049	2008 VG_{42}	—	November 3, 2008	Mount Lemmon	Mount Lemmon Survey	·	1.5 km	MPC · JPL
389050	2008 VL_{46}	—	October 20, 2008	Kitt Peak	Spacewatch	·	1.7 km	MPC · JPL
389051	2008 VE_{47}	—	November 3, 2008	Kitt Peak	Spacewatch	·	1.6 km	MPC · JPL
389052	2008 VH_{51}	—	November 4, 2008	Kitt Peak	Spacewatch	·	1.6 km	MPC · JPL
389053	2008 VK_{51}	—	November 4, 2008	Kitt Peak	Spacewatch	·	1.5 km	MPC · JPL
389054	2008 VP_{52}	—	September 29, 2008	Mount Lemmon	Mount Lemmon Survey	·	1.9 km	MPC · JPL
389055	2008 VS_{53}	—	September 22, 2008	Mount Lemmon	Mount Lemmon Survey	EUN	1.7 km	MPC · JPL
389056	2008 VY_{63}	—	November 8, 2008	Kitt Peak	Spacewatch	·	1.9 km	MPC · JPL
389057	2008 VH_{64}	—	November 3, 2008	Kitt Peak	Spacewatch	·	1.9 km	MPC · JPL
389058	2008 VV_{66}	—	November 6, 2008	Kitt Peak	Spacewatch	JUN	1.4 km	MPC · JPL
389059	2008 VD_{72}	—	November 6, 2008	Kitt Peak	Spacewatch	·	1.5 km	MPC · JPL
389060	2008 VE_{79}	—	November 1, 2008	Socorro	LINEAR	·	2.1 km	MPC · JPL
389061	2008 WJ	—	November 18, 2008	Sandlot	G. Hug	·	1.4 km	MPC · JPL
389062	2008 WJ_{2}	—	November 19, 2008	Skylive	Tozzi, F.	·	2.3 km	MPC · JPL
389063	2008 WY_{8}	—	September 26, 2008	Kitt Peak	Spacewatch	·	1.1 km	MPC · JPL
389064	2008 WJ_{30}	—	November 19, 2008	Mount Lemmon	Mount Lemmon Survey	(5)	1.1 km	MPC · JPL
389065	2008 WT_{49}	—	November 18, 2008	Catalina	CSS	·	1.5 km	MPC · JPL
389066	2008 WE_{50}	—	November 18, 2008	Catalina	CSS	HNS	2.4 km	MPC · JPL
389067	2008 WG_{55}	—	November 20, 2008	Kitt Peak	Spacewatch	MIS	2.3 km	MPC · JPL
389068	2008 WE_{60}	—	November 7, 2008	Mount Lemmon	Mount Lemmon Survey	(5)	1.6 km	MPC · JPL
389069	2008 WG_{63}	—	November 20, 2008	Socorro	LINEAR	·	1.4 km	MPC · JPL
389070	2008 WE_{70}	—	November 18, 2008	Kitt Peak	Spacewatch	·	1.4 km	MPC · JPL
389071	2008 WC_{72}	—	November 19, 2008	Kitt Peak	Spacewatch	·	1.7 km	MPC · JPL
389072	2008 WN_{79}	—	November 20, 2008	Kitt Peak	Spacewatch	(5)	2.0 km	MPC · JPL
389073	2008 WG_{87}	—	November 1, 2008	Mount Lemmon	Mount Lemmon Survey	·	1.2 km	MPC · JPL
389074	2008 WF_{102}	—	October 10, 2008	Catalina	CSS	·	2.5 km	MPC · JPL
389075	2008 WV_{111}	—	November 21, 2008	Kitt Peak	Spacewatch	NYS	1.2 km	MPC · JPL
389076	2008 WV_{113}	—	November 30, 2008	Kitt Peak	Spacewatch	(7744)	1.3 km	MPC · JPL
389077	2008 WW_{115}	—	November 30, 2008	Kitt Peak	Spacewatch	·	1.2 km	MPC · JPL
389078	2008 WX_{118}	—	November 30, 2008	Mount Lemmon	Mount Lemmon Survey	·	1.3 km	MPC · JPL
389079	2008 WL_{122}	—	October 25, 2008	Catalina	CSS	·	1.9 km	MPC · JPL
389080	2008 WZ_{124}	—	November 19, 2008	Kitt Peak	Spacewatch	·	1.6 km	MPC · JPL
389081	2008 WR_{130}	—	November 30, 2008	Kitt Peak	Spacewatch	DOR	2.0 km	MPC · JPL
389082	2008 WC_{133}	—	November 28, 2008	La Sagra	OAM	·	1.8 km	MPC · JPL
389083	2008 WY_{133}	—	December 9, 2004	Kitt Peak	Spacewatch	·	1.3 km	MPC · JPL
389084	2008 WB_{137}	—	December 18, 2004	Mount Lemmon	Mount Lemmon Survey	·	1.7 km	MPC · JPL
389085	2008 WC_{138}	—	November 30, 2008	Socorro	LINEAR	(5)	1.7 km	MPC · JPL
389086	2008 XS_{1}	—	December 2, 2008	Vail-Jarnac	Jarnac	·	2.1 km	MPC · JPL
389087	2008 XY_{4}	—	December 4, 2008	Socorro	LINEAR	·	2.0 km	MPC · JPL
389088	2008 XG_{8}	—	October 28, 2008	Catalina	CSS	·	1.6 km	MPC · JPL
389089	2008 XH_{21}	—	December 1, 2008	Kitt Peak	Spacewatch	·	2.0 km	MPC · JPL
389090	2008 XX_{31}	—	March 23, 2006	Catalina	CSS	·	2.8 km	MPC · JPL
389091	2008 XS_{32}	—	December 2, 2008	Kitt Peak	Spacewatch	·	3.4 km	MPC · JPL
389092	2008 XM_{34}	—	December 2, 2008	Kitt Peak	Spacewatch	·	1.3 km	MPC · JPL
389093	2008 XB_{38}	—	November 24, 2008	Kitt Peak	Spacewatch	AEO	1.2 km	MPC · JPL
389094	2008 XB_{40}	—	October 24, 2003	Kitt Peak	Spacewatch	·	2.3 km	MPC · JPL
389095	2008 XT_{40}	—	December 2, 2008	Mount Lemmon	Mount Lemmon Survey	·	1.5 km	MPC · JPL
389096	2008 XB_{41}	—	December 2, 2008	Kitt Peak	Spacewatch	URS	3.8 km	MPC · JPL
389097	2008 XW_{46}	—	December 6, 2008	Mount Lemmon	Mount Lemmon Survey	·	3.1 km	MPC · JPL
389098	2008 XC_{48}	—	December 4, 2008	Mount Lemmon	Mount Lemmon Survey	·	2.1 km	MPC · JPL
389099	2008 XW_{52}	—	December 3, 2008	Mount Lemmon	Mount Lemmon Survey	EOS	1.7 km	MPC · JPL
389100	2008 YQ_{8}	—	December 25, 2008	Mayhill	Lowe, A.	·	1.7 km	MPC · JPL

== 389101–389200 ==
back to top

Designation			Discovery			Properties		Ref
Permanent	Provisional	Named after	Date	Site	Discoverer(s)	Category	Diam.	Ref
389101	2008 YA_{11}	—	December 20, 2008	Mount Lemmon	Mount Lemmon Survey	·	1.6 km	MPC · JPL
389102	2008 YL_{11}	—	December 20, 2008	Lulin	LUSS	·	1.6 km	MPC · JPL
389103	2008 YZ_{13}	—	December 20, 2008	Mount Lemmon	Mount Lemmon Survey	MIS	2.4 km	MPC · JPL
389104	2008 YB_{14}	—	November 17, 2004	Campo Imperatore	CINEOS	NYS	1.7 km	MPC · JPL
389105	2008 YC_{18}	—	December 21, 2008	Mount Lemmon	Mount Lemmon Survey	HOF	2.9 km	MPC · JPL
389106	2008 YE_{20}	—	November 21, 2008	Mount Lemmon	Mount Lemmon Survey	·	2.1 km	MPC · JPL
389107	2008 YP_{35}	—	December 22, 2008	Kitt Peak	Spacewatch	·	3.1 km	MPC · JPL
389108	2008 YN_{37}	—	December 22, 2008	Kitt Peak	Spacewatch	·	1.7 km	MPC · JPL
389109	2008 YJ_{40}	—	December 29, 2008	Kitt Peak	Spacewatch	·	2.1 km	MPC · JPL
389110	2008 YN_{57}	—	December 5, 2008	Mount Lemmon	Mount Lemmon Survey	MRX	1.2 km	MPC · JPL
389111	2008 YQ_{62}	—	December 30, 2008	Mount Lemmon	Mount Lemmon Survey	·	1.9 km	MPC · JPL
389112	2008 YG_{63}	—	December 30, 2008	Mount Lemmon	Mount Lemmon Survey	AEO	1.1 km	MPC · JPL
389113	2008 YT_{90}	—	December 29, 2008	Kitt Peak	Spacewatch	·	2.0 km	MPC · JPL
389114	2008 YC_{92}	—	December 29, 2008	Kitt Peak	Spacewatch	·	2.1 km	MPC · JPL
389115	2008 YP_{94}	—	December 29, 2008	Kitt Peak	Spacewatch	·	2.9 km	MPC · JPL
389116	2008 YD_{96}	—	December 29, 2008	Kitt Peak	Spacewatch	·	3.0 km	MPC · JPL
389117	2008 YE_{97}	—	December 29, 2008	Mount Lemmon	Mount Lemmon Survey	·	1.8 km	MPC · JPL
389118	2008 YW_{105}	—	December 29, 2008	Kitt Peak	Spacewatch	·	2.4 km	MPC · JPL
389119	2008 YY_{107}	—	November 24, 2008	Mount Lemmon	Mount Lemmon Survey	·	2.0 km	MPC · JPL
389120	2008 YD_{117}	—	December 29, 2008	Kitt Peak	Spacewatch	(12739)	1.4 km	MPC · JPL
389121	2008 YD_{118}	—	December 29, 2008	Mount Lemmon	Mount Lemmon Survey	·	2.6 km	MPC · JPL
389122	2008 YV_{119}	—	December 30, 2008	Kitt Peak	Spacewatch	·	1.2 km	MPC · JPL
389123	2008 YM_{127}	—	December 30, 2008	Kitt Peak	Spacewatch	·	1.8 km	MPC · JPL
389124	2008 YV_{127}	—	December 30, 2008	Kitt Peak	Spacewatch	·	1.4 km	MPC · JPL
389125	2008 YN_{142}	—	December 30, 2008	Kitt Peak	Spacewatch	·	1.7 km	MPC · JPL
389126	2008 YK_{143}	—	December 22, 2008	Mount Lemmon	Mount Lemmon Survey	WIT	1.0 km	MPC · JPL
389127	2008 YB_{148}	—	December 31, 2008	Mount Lemmon	Mount Lemmon Survey	·	1.7 km	MPC · JPL
389128	2008 YV_{150}	—	December 22, 2008	Kitt Peak	Spacewatch	·	1.3 km	MPC · JPL
389129	2008 YB_{168}	—	December 21, 2008	Catalina	CSS	·	2.0 km	MPC · JPL
389130	2008 YW_{170}	—	December 31, 2008	Kitt Peak	Spacewatch	·	2.1 km	MPC · JPL
389131	2009 AW_{1}	—	January 3, 2009	Farra d'Isonzo	Farra d'Isonzo	·	1.5 km	MPC · JPL
389132	2009 AT_{23}	—	December 22, 2008	Kitt Peak	Spacewatch	·	1.9 km	MPC · JPL
389133	2009 AP_{31}	—	January 15, 2009	Kitt Peak	Spacewatch	·	3.5 km	MPC · JPL
389134	2009 AW_{32}	—	September 13, 2007	Mount Lemmon	Mount Lemmon Survey	·	1.6 km	MPC · JPL
389135	2009 AH_{33}	—	January 15, 2009	Kitt Peak	Spacewatch	HOF	2.7 km	MPC · JPL
389136	2009 AW_{35}	—	December 31, 2008	Mount Lemmon	Mount Lemmon Survey	HOF	2.4 km	MPC · JPL
389137	2009 AW_{37}	—	January 2, 2009	Kitt Peak	Spacewatch	·	1.4 km	MPC · JPL
389138	2009 AE_{39}	—	March 10, 2005	Mount Lemmon	Mount Lemmon Survey	·	1.5 km	MPC · JPL
389139	2009 AL_{43}	—	January 15, 2009	Kitt Peak	Spacewatch	AGN	1.1 km	MPC · JPL
389140	2009 AE_{46}	—	January 3, 2009	Mount Lemmon	Mount Lemmon Survey	AGN	1.4 km	MPC · JPL
389141	2009 AF_{47}	—	January 1, 2009	Kitt Peak	Spacewatch	·	2.0 km	MPC · JPL
389142	2009 AG_{50}	—	January 1, 2009	Kitt Peak	Spacewatch	·	3.8 km	MPC · JPL
389143	2009 AB_{51}	—	October 10, 2007	Catalina	CSS	·	1.9 km	MPC · JPL
389144	2009 BY_{3}	—	January 3, 2009	Mount Lemmon	Mount Lemmon Survey	·	3.0 km	MPC · JPL
389145	2009 BC_{6}	—	January 17, 2009	Socorro	LINEAR	MAR	1.3 km	MPC · JPL
389146	2009 BO_{27}	—	January 16, 2009	Kitt Peak	Spacewatch	·	2.9 km	MPC · JPL
389147	2009 BB_{30}	—	January 16, 2009	Kitt Peak	Spacewatch	·	2.8 km	MPC · JPL
389148	2009 BC_{30}	—	December 29, 2008	Kitt Peak	Spacewatch	(12739)	1.9 km	MPC · JPL
389149	2009 BA_{31}	—	January 16, 2009	Kitt Peak	Spacewatch	EOS	2.3 km	MPC · JPL
389150	2009 BW_{32}	—	January 16, 2009	Kitt Peak	Spacewatch	·	1.4 km	MPC · JPL
389151	2009 BY_{33}	—	January 2, 2009	Mount Lemmon	Mount Lemmon Survey	KOR	1.4 km	MPC · JPL
389152	2009 BN_{37}	—	December 30, 2008	Mount Lemmon	Mount Lemmon Survey	·	2.3 km	MPC · JPL
389153	2009 BR_{37}	—	January 16, 2009	Kitt Peak	Spacewatch	THM	1.9 km	MPC · JPL
389154	2009 BL_{39}	—	January 16, 2009	Kitt Peak	Spacewatch	·	2.0 km	MPC · JPL
389155	2009 BC_{40}	—	January 16, 2009	Kitt Peak	Spacewatch	·	3.6 km	MPC · JPL
389156	2009 BA_{45}	—	January 16, 2009	Kitt Peak	Spacewatch	EOS	2.0 km	MPC · JPL
389157	2009 BL_{47}	—	January 16, 2009	Kitt Peak	Spacewatch	EOS	1.9 km	MPC · JPL
389158	2009 BX_{50}	—	January 16, 2009	Mount Lemmon	Mount Lemmon Survey	WIT	1.0 km	MPC · JPL
389159	2009 BH_{52}	—	January 16, 2009	Mount Lemmon	Mount Lemmon Survey	HOF	3.0 km	MPC · JPL
389160	2009 BU_{58}	—	January 16, 2009	Mount Lemmon	Mount Lemmon Survey	·	1.6 km	MPC · JPL
389161	2009 BG_{59}	—	May 14, 2005	Kitt Peak	Spacewatch	·	3.4 km	MPC · JPL
389162	2009 BS_{59}	—	December 29, 2008	Kitt Peak	Spacewatch	AGN	1.0 km	MPC · JPL
389163	2009 BH_{63}	—	January 20, 2009	Kitt Peak	Spacewatch	·	1.9 km	MPC · JPL
389164	2009 BL_{63}	—	January 20, 2009	Mount Lemmon	Mount Lemmon Survey	·	2.3 km	MPC · JPL
389165	2009 BT_{69}	—	November 24, 2008	Mount Lemmon	Mount Lemmon Survey	·	2.5 km	MPC · JPL
389166	2009 BU_{88}	—	January 25, 2009	Kitt Peak	Spacewatch	DOR	2.8 km	MPC · JPL
389167	2009 BN_{90}	—	January 25, 2009	Kitt Peak	Spacewatch	·	1.6 km	MPC · JPL
389168	2009 BT_{92}	—	January 25, 2009	Kitt Peak	Spacewatch	·	2.3 km	MPC · JPL
389169	2009 BE_{93}	—	January 25, 2009	Kitt Peak	Spacewatch	·	3.7 km	MPC · JPL
389170	2009 BR_{98}	—	January 26, 2009	Kitt Peak	Spacewatch	·	4.5 km	MPC · JPL
389171	2009 BB_{102}	—	January 29, 2009	Mount Lemmon	Mount Lemmon Survey	(1118)	4.5 km	MPC · JPL
389172	2009 BS_{107}	—	January 29, 2009	Mount Lemmon	Mount Lemmon Survey	·	2.0 km	MPC · JPL
389173	2009 BV_{117}	—	December 31, 2008	Kitt Peak	Spacewatch	·	2.4 km	MPC · JPL
389174	2009 BD_{121}	—	January 31, 2009	Kitt Peak	Spacewatch	NAE	2.7 km	MPC · JPL
389175	2009 BK_{123}	—	January 31, 2009	Kitt Peak	Spacewatch	H	640 m	MPC · JPL
389176	2009 BH_{124}	—	January 31, 2009	Kitt Peak	Spacewatch	·	1.8 km	MPC · JPL
389177	2009 BE_{129}	—	January 16, 2009	Kitt Peak	Spacewatch	·	2.8 km	MPC · JPL
389178	2009 BW_{129}	—	January 31, 2009	Kitt Peak	Spacewatch	·	2.2 km	MPC · JPL
389179	2009 BL_{147}	—	January 30, 2009	Mount Lemmon	Mount Lemmon Survey	·	1.9 km	MPC · JPL
389180	2009 BP_{147}	—	January 30, 2009	Mount Lemmon	Mount Lemmon Survey	·	2.4 km	MPC · JPL
389181	2009 BU_{154}	—	January 16, 2009	Mount Lemmon	Mount Lemmon Survey	PAD	1.6 km	MPC · JPL
389182	2009 BF_{159}	—	January 31, 2009	Kitt Peak	Spacewatch	KOR	1.5 km	MPC · JPL
389183	2009 BS_{168}	—	January 24, 2009	Cerro Burek	Burek, Cerro	·	2.1 km	MPC · JPL
389184	2009 BS_{169}	—	January 16, 2009	Kitt Peak	Spacewatch	·	2.5 km	MPC · JPL
389185	2009 BQ_{171}	—	January 17, 2009	Kitt Peak	Spacewatch	·	2.5 km	MPC · JPL
389186	2009 BG_{173}	—	January 20, 2009	Kitt Peak	Spacewatch	KOR	1.2 km	MPC · JPL
389187	2009 BH_{176}	—	January 31, 2009	Mount Lemmon	Mount Lemmon Survey	EOS	1.8 km	MPC · JPL
389188	2009 BO_{178}	—	January 25, 2009	Catalina	CSS	BRA	2.1 km	MPC · JPL
389189	2009 BR_{181}	—	January 20, 2009	Mount Lemmon	Mount Lemmon Survey	·	3.7 km	MPC · JPL
389190	2009 BW_{181}	—	January 30, 2009	Mount Lemmon	Mount Lemmon Survey	EOS	1.9 km	MPC · JPL
389191	2009 CS_{3}	—	January 1, 2009	Mount Lemmon	Mount Lemmon Survey	·	2.3 km	MPC · JPL
389192	2009 CG_{15}	—	February 3, 2009	Kitt Peak	Spacewatch	THM	2.1 km	MPC · JPL
389193	2009 CO_{21}	—	January 18, 2009	Mount Lemmon	Mount Lemmon Survey	AGN	1.2 km	MPC · JPL
389194	2009 CS_{23}	—	February 1, 2009	Mount Lemmon	Mount Lemmon Survey	·	4.1 km	MPC · JPL
389195	2009 CH_{27}	—	May 26, 2006	Mount Lemmon	Mount Lemmon Survey	·	3.0 km	MPC · JPL
389196	2009 CG_{29}	—	February 1, 2009	Kitt Peak	Spacewatch	·	2.5 km	MPC · JPL
389197	2009 CM_{49}	—	February 14, 2009	Mount Lemmon	Mount Lemmon Survey	·	2.6 km	MPC · JPL
389198	2009 CM_{51}	—	February 3, 2009	Kitt Peak	Spacewatch	·	2.5 km	MPC · JPL
389199	2009 CH_{54}	—	February 14, 2009	Catalina	CSS	·	1.9 km	MPC · JPL
389200	2009 CF_{58}	—	February 3, 2009	Kitt Peak	Spacewatch	·	1.5 km	MPC · JPL

== 389201–389300 ==
back to top

Designation			Discovery			Properties		Ref
Permanent	Provisional	Named after	Date	Site	Discoverer(s)	Category	Diam.	Ref
389201	2009 CQ_{59}	—	December 4, 2007	Mount Lemmon	Mount Lemmon Survey	·	1.9 km	MPC · JPL
389202	2009 CN_{62}	—	February 5, 2009	Mount Lemmon	Mount Lemmon Survey	·	1.9 km	MPC · JPL
389203	2009 CB_{63}	—	February 4, 2009	Mount Lemmon	Mount Lemmon Survey	EOS	2.4 km	MPC · JPL
389204	2009 DZ_{1}	—	February 16, 2009	Dauban	Kugel, F.	·	2.4 km	MPC · JPL
389205	2009 DV_{6}	—	February 17, 2009	Kitt Peak	Spacewatch	·	3.3 km	MPC · JPL
389206	2009 DA_{14}	—	February 16, 2009	Kitt Peak	Spacewatch	·	2.2 km	MPC · JPL
389207	2009 DD_{22}	—	October 10, 2007	Mount Lemmon	Mount Lemmon Survey	·	2.2 km	MPC · JPL
389208	2009 DO_{24}	—	February 21, 2009	Kitt Peak	Spacewatch	EOS	2.1 km	MPC · JPL
389209	2009 DR_{27}	—	February 22, 2009	Calar Alto	F. Hormuth	KOR	1.3 km	MPC · JPL
389210	2009 DN_{32}	—	April 21, 2004	Kitt Peak	Spacewatch	THM	2.2 km	MPC · JPL
389211	2009 DU_{47}	—	February 28, 2009	Socorro	LINEAR	BRA	1.8 km	MPC · JPL
389212	2009 DP_{48}	—	February 19, 2009	Kitt Peak	Spacewatch	·	2.4 km	MPC · JPL
389213	2009 DR_{50}	—	February 19, 2009	Kitt Peak	Spacewatch	·	3.1 km	MPC · JPL
389214	2009 DL_{51}	—	February 21, 2009	Kitt Peak	Spacewatch	·	2.2 km	MPC · JPL
389215	2009 DZ_{67}	—	February 21, 2009	Mount Lemmon	Mount Lemmon Survey	·	2.2 km	MPC · JPL
389216	2009 DT_{81}	—	February 24, 2009	Kitt Peak	Spacewatch	·	1.9 km	MPC · JPL
389217	2009 DZ_{91}	—	February 27, 2009	Kitt Peak	Spacewatch	KOR	1.4 km	MPC · JPL
389218	2009 DE_{93}	—	February 28, 2009	Mount Lemmon	Mount Lemmon Survey	·	2.8 km	MPC · JPL
389219	2009 DY_{98}	—	September 11, 2001	Anderson Mesa	LONEOS	EOS	2.1 km	MPC · JPL
389220	2009 DX_{116}	—	February 27, 2009	Kitt Peak	Spacewatch	·	2.0 km	MPC · JPL
389221	2009 DY_{118}	—	February 27, 2009	Kitt Peak	Spacewatch	VER	2.4 km	MPC · JPL
389222	2009 DH_{121}	—	November 9, 2007	Kitt Peak	Spacewatch	KOR	1.4 km	MPC · JPL
389223	2009 DL_{128}	—	February 22, 2009	Mount Lemmon	Mount Lemmon Survey	EOS	2.0 km	MPC · JPL
389224	2009 DF_{129}	—	February 26, 2009	Kitt Peak	Spacewatch	·	3.1 km	MPC · JPL
389225	2009 DA_{138}	—	February 19, 2009	Kitt Peak	Spacewatch	·	2.1 km	MPC · JPL
389226	2009 DC_{139}	—	February 27, 2009	Kitt Peak	Spacewatch	·	2.0 km	MPC · JPL
389227	2009 DY_{139}	—	October 9, 2007	Mount Lemmon	Mount Lemmon Survey	·	1.9 km	MPC · JPL
389228	2009 DB_{141}	—	February 19, 2009	Kitt Peak	Spacewatch	EOS	2.2 km	MPC · JPL
389229	2009 EN_{9}	—	March 1, 2009	Kitt Peak	Spacewatch	·	1.8 km	MPC · JPL
389230	2009 EL_{10}	—	March 1, 2009	Kitt Peak	Spacewatch	THM	2.5 km	MPC · JPL
389231	2009 EY_{12}	—	March 3, 2009	Catalina	CSS	·	2.9 km	MPC · JPL
389232	2009 EL_{14}	—	March 15, 2009	Kitt Peak	Spacewatch	HOF	2.9 km	MPC · JPL
389233	2009 EJ_{17}	—	March 15, 2009	Kitt Peak	Spacewatch	·	2.4 km	MPC · JPL
389234	2009 ED_{21}	—	March 15, 2009	La Sagra	OAM	·	3.9 km	MPC · JPL
389235	2009 EJ_{21}	—	March 3, 2009	Mount Lemmon	Mount Lemmon Survey	THM	2.1 km	MPC · JPL
389236	2009 EA_{22}	—	March 15, 2009	Mount Lemmon	Mount Lemmon Survey	TEL	2.1 km	MPC · JPL
389237	2009 ED_{22}	—	March 2, 2009	Mount Lemmon	Mount Lemmon Survey	·	3.7 km	MPC · JPL
389238	2009 EO_{24}	—	March 2, 2009	Kitt Peak	Spacewatch	THM	2.4 km	MPC · JPL
389239	2009 FQ_{7}	—	March 16, 2009	Kitt Peak	Spacewatch	·	3.5 km	MPC · JPL
389240	2009 FF_{9}	—	March 16, 2009	Mount Lemmon	Mount Lemmon Survey	·	1.7 km	MPC · JPL
389241	2009 FJ_{12}	—	March 18, 2009	Mount Lemmon	Mount Lemmon Survey	·	1.5 km	MPC · JPL
389242	2009 FW_{12}	—	February 19, 2009	Kitt Peak	Spacewatch	EOS	2.3 km	MPC · JPL
389243	2009 FQ_{21}	—	February 20, 2009	Kitt Peak	Spacewatch	·	3.4 km	MPC · JPL
389244	2009 FW_{27}	—	December 19, 2007	Mount Lemmon	Mount Lemmon Survey	EOS	2.3 km	MPC · JPL
389245	2009 FD_{31}	—	March 24, 2009	Socorro	LINEAR	·	3.3 km	MPC · JPL
389246	2009 FR_{31}	—	February 1, 2009	Mount Lemmon	Mount Lemmon Survey	H	620 m	MPC · JPL
389247	2009 FV_{33}	—	March 19, 2009	Mount Lemmon	Mount Lemmon Survey	EOS	1.9 km	MPC · JPL
389248	2009 FV_{37}	—	December 22, 2008	Kitt Peak	Spacewatch	·	2.9 km	MPC · JPL
389249	2009 FA_{38}	—	February 20, 2009	Kitt Peak	Spacewatch	·	1.9 km	MPC · JPL
389250	2009 FO_{39}	—	January 31, 2009	Mount Lemmon	Mount Lemmon Survey	·	2.8 km	MPC · JPL
389251	2009 FP_{42}	—	March 17, 2009	Kitt Peak	Spacewatch	·	3.2 km	MPC · JPL
389252	2009 FL_{45}	—	March 18, 2009	Catalina	CSS	·	1.9 km	MPC · JPL
389253	2009 FB_{46}	—	March 28, 2009	Mount Lemmon	Mount Lemmon Survey	·	3.0 km	MPC · JPL
389254	2009 FG_{47}	—	March 28, 2009	Kitt Peak	Spacewatch	LIX	4.5 km	MPC · JPL
389255	2009 FK_{48}	—	March 24, 2009	Mount Lemmon	Mount Lemmon Survey	·	1.8 km	MPC · JPL
389256	2009 FW_{49}	—	March 27, 2009	Mount Lemmon	Mount Lemmon Survey	KOR	1.4 km	MPC · JPL
389257	2009 FY_{50}	—	March 28, 2009	Kitt Peak	Spacewatch	·	2.8 km	MPC · JPL
389258	2009 FR_{54}	—	March 29, 2009	Mount Lemmon	Mount Lemmon Survey	EOS	2.1 km	MPC · JPL
389259	2009 FG_{55}	—	March 31, 2009	Kitt Peak	Spacewatch	·	3.5 km	MPC · JPL
389260	2009 FL_{61}	—	March 16, 2009	Kitt Peak	Spacewatch	THM	2.4 km	MPC · JPL
389261	2009 FN_{62}	—	March 23, 2009	Purple Mountain	PMO NEO Survey Program	·	3.9 km	MPC · JPL
389262	2009 FW_{62}	—	September 15, 2006	Kitt Peak	Spacewatch	·	2.7 km	MPC · JPL
389263	2009 FR_{64}	—	March 16, 2009	Kitt Peak	Spacewatch	·	3.1 km	MPC · JPL
389264	2009 FN_{66}	—	March 21, 2009	Kitt Peak	Spacewatch	THM	2.3 km	MPC · JPL
389265	2009 FS_{71}	—	March 31, 2009	Kitt Peak	Spacewatch	THM	2.2 km	MPC · JPL
389266	2009 FY_{71}	—	March 16, 2009	Kitt Peak	Spacewatch	·	3.2 km	MPC · JPL
389267	2009 FZ_{73}	—	March 29, 2009	Kitt Peak	Spacewatch	EOS	2.2 km	MPC · JPL
389268	2009 FE_{75}	—	March 17, 2009	Kitt Peak	Spacewatch	·	2.9 km	MPC · JPL
389269	2009 GE_{4}	—	April 5, 2009	Kitt Peak	Spacewatch	·	4.3 km	MPC · JPL
389270	2009 GW_{4}	—	April 1, 2009	Catalina	CSS	·	4.1 km	MPC · JPL
389271	2009 HE_{3}	—	April 16, 2009	Catalina	CSS	TIR	3.3 km	MPC · JPL
389272	2009 HP_{4}	—	April 17, 2009	Kitt Peak	Spacewatch	·	4.2 km	MPC · JPL
389273	2009 HX_{6}	—	April 17, 2009	Kitt Peak	Spacewatch	·	3.3 km	MPC · JPL
389274	2009 HD_{14}	—	March 16, 2009	Kitt Peak	Spacewatch	·	3.3 km	MPC · JPL
389275	2009 HJ_{18}	—	April 18, 2009	Mount Lemmon	Mount Lemmon Survey	·	2.5 km	MPC · JPL
389276	2009 HC_{23}	—	April 17, 2009	Kitt Peak	Spacewatch	TIR	2.6 km	MPC · JPL
389277	2009 HH_{29}	—	April 19, 2009	Kitt Peak	Spacewatch	H	650 m	MPC · JPL
389278	2009 HD_{32}	—	August 30, 2005	Kitt Peak	Spacewatch	·	3.2 km	MPC · JPL
389279	2009 HY_{45}	—	April 22, 2009	La Sagra	OAM	·	2.6 km	MPC · JPL
389280	2009 HQ_{46}	—	April 20, 2009	Taunus	E. Schwab, R. Kling	·	3.0 km	MPC · JPL
389281	2009 HQ_{48}	—	April 19, 2009	Catalina	CSS	·	4.4 km	MPC · JPL
389282	2009 HK_{50}	—	April 21, 2009	Kitt Peak	Spacewatch	·	3.3 km	MPC · JPL
389283	2009 HY_{68}	—	April 22, 2009	Mount Lemmon	Mount Lemmon Survey	THM	2.6 km	MPC · JPL
389284	2009 HH_{72}	—	April 26, 2009	Kitt Peak	Spacewatch	·	3.4 km	MPC · JPL
389285	2009 HY_{76}	—	April 28, 2009	Mount Lemmon	Mount Lemmon Survey	·	3.0 km	MPC · JPL
389286	2009 HE_{84}	—	April 27, 2009	Catalina	CSS	BRA	1.8 km	MPC · JPL
389287	2009 HR_{96}	—	April 26, 2009	Kitt Peak	Spacewatch	·	2.7 km	MPC · JPL
389288	2009 HQ_{99}	—	April 22, 2009	Mount Lemmon	Mount Lemmon Survey	·	2.5 km	MPC · JPL
389289	2009 JX_{2}	—	May 13, 2009	Mount Lemmon	Mount Lemmon Survey	HIL · 3:2 · (6124)	5.0 km	MPC · JPL
389290	2009 JO_{5}	—	May 2, 2009	Siding Spring	SSS	TIR	3.4 km	MPC · JPL
389291	2009 JC_{17}	—	May 13, 2009	Kitt Peak	Spacewatch	·	3.2 km	MPC · JPL
389292	2009 JL_{17}	—	May 2, 2009	Catalina	CSS	·	3.4 km	MPC · JPL
389293 Hasubick	2009 KH_{2}	Hasubick	May 19, 2009	Tzec Maun	E. Schwab	T_{j} (2.98) · EUP	4.2 km	MPC · JPL
389294	2009 KO_{12}	—	May 25, 2009	Kitt Peak	Spacewatch	·	2.2 km	MPC · JPL
389295	2009 KM_{16}	—	May 26, 2009	Kitt Peak	Spacewatch	·	2.5 km	MPC · JPL
389296	2009 KL_{22}	—	May 31, 2009	La Sagra	OAM	·	3.4 km	MPC · JPL
389297	2009 KH_{30}	—	May 30, 2009	Catalina	CSS	·	4.6 km	MPC · JPL
389298	2009 LQ_{6}	—	June 14, 2009	Catalina	CSS	EUP	4.4 km	MPC · JPL
389299	2009 OX_{15}	—	October 27, 2006	Catalina	CSS	·	780 m	MPC · JPL
389300	2009 QE_{16}	—	August 16, 2009	Kitt Peak	Spacewatch	·	620 m	MPC · JPL

== 389301–389400 ==
back to top

Designation			Discovery			Properties		Ref
Permanent	Provisional	Named after	Date	Site	Discoverer(s)	Category	Diam.	Ref
389301	2009 QH_{16}	—	August 16, 2009	Kitt Peak	Spacewatch	L4	8.4 km	MPC · JPL
389302	2009 RV_{25}	—	September 15, 2009	Kitt Peak	Spacewatch	L4	9.0 km	MPC · JPL
389303	2009 RZ_{30}	—	September 14, 2009	Kitt Peak	Spacewatch	·	700 m	MPC · JPL
389304	2009 RC_{44}	—	April 4, 2003	Kitt Peak	Spacewatch	L4	10 km	MPC · JPL
389305	2009 RY_{49}	—	September 15, 2009	Kitt Peak	Spacewatch	L4	8.9 km	MPC · JPL
389306	2009 RL_{53}	—	September 15, 2009	Kitt Peak	Spacewatch	·	730 m	MPC · JPL
389307	2009 RU_{63}	—	September 15, 2009	Kitt Peak	Spacewatch	L4	9.1 km	MPC · JPL
389308	2009 SA_{10}	—	September 16, 2009	Mount Lemmon	Mount Lemmon Survey	·	680 m	MPC · JPL
389309	2009 SK_{25}	—	September 9, 2008	Mount Lemmon	Mount Lemmon Survey	L4	8.5 km	MPC · JPL
389310	2009 SS_{32}	—	September 16, 2009	Kitt Peak	Spacewatch	L4	10 km	MPC · JPL
389311	2009 SF_{36}	—	September 16, 2009	Kitt Peak	Spacewatch	·	650 m	MPC · JPL
389312	2009 SR_{70}	—	September 17, 2009	Kitt Peak	Spacewatch	·	740 m	MPC · JPL
389313	2009 SU_{76}	—	September 17, 2009	Kitt Peak	Spacewatch	L4	9.9 km	MPC · JPL
389314	2009 SH_{114}	—	September 18, 2009	Kitt Peak	Spacewatch	L4	8.9 km	MPC · JPL
389315	2009 SN_{115}	—	September 18, 2009	Kitt Peak	Spacewatch	·	610 m	MPC · JPL
389316	2009 SJ_{119}	—	September 18, 2009	Kitt Peak	Spacewatch	L4	7.8 km	MPC · JPL
389317	2009 ST_{140}	—	June 19, 2007	Kitt Peak	Spacewatch	L4 · ERY	9.3 km	MPC · JPL
389318	2009 SV_{169}	—	September 19, 2009	Mount Lemmon	Mount Lemmon Survey	L4 · (8060)	9.8 km	MPC · JPL
389319	2009 SO_{188}	—	September 21, 2009	Kitt Peak	Spacewatch	·	1.0 km	MPC · JPL
389320	2009 SR_{197}	—	September 18, 2009	Kitt Peak	Spacewatch	L4	10 km	MPC · JPL
389321	2009 SQ_{199}	—	September 22, 2009	Kitt Peak	Spacewatch	L4	7.3 km	MPC · JPL
389322	2009 SQ_{203}	—	September 22, 2009	Kitt Peak	Spacewatch	L4	9.4 km	MPC · JPL
389323	2009 SL_{218}	—	September 24, 2009	Kitt Peak	Spacewatch	L4	7.7 km	MPC · JPL
389324	2009 SJ_{233}	—	September 19, 2009	Kitt Peak	Spacewatch	·	820 m	MPC · JPL
389325	2009 SW_{242}	—	September 20, 2009	La Sagra	OAM	·	650 m	MPC · JPL
389326	2009 SB_{244}	—	September 6, 2008	Kitt Peak	Spacewatch	L4	8.4 km	MPC · JPL
389327	2009 SB_{248}	—	July 30, 2008	Mount Lemmon	Mount Lemmon Survey	L4 · ERY	7.5 km	MPC · JPL
389328	2009 SU_{253}	—	September 17, 2009	Kitt Peak	Spacewatch	L4	7.1 km	MPC · JPL
389329	2009 SP_{267}	—	September 23, 2009	Mount Lemmon	Mount Lemmon Survey	·	930 m	MPC · JPL
389330	2009 SF_{272}	—	September 16, 2009	Kitt Peak	Spacewatch	·	720 m	MPC · JPL
389331	2009 SL_{281}	—	September 25, 2009	Kitt Peak	Spacewatch	L4	9.0 km	MPC · JPL
389332	2009 SF_{283}	—	September 25, 2009	Kitt Peak	Spacewatch	L4	8.2 km	MPC · JPL
389333	2009 SO_{290}	—	September 17, 2009	Kitt Peak	Spacewatch	·	800 m	MPC · JPL
389334	2009 SP_{295}	—	September 27, 2009	Mount Lemmon	Mount Lemmon Survey	L4	7.1 km	MPC · JPL
389335	2009 SN_{298}	—	September 29, 2009	Kitt Peak	Spacewatch	L4	8.9 km	MPC · JPL
389336	2009 SN_{306}	—	September 17, 2009	Kitt Peak	Spacewatch	L4	8.1 km	MPC · JPL
389337	2009 SQ_{318}	—	September 20, 2009	Kitt Peak	Spacewatch	L4	7.4 km	MPC · JPL
389338	2009 SS_{322}	—	August 18, 2009	Kitt Peak	Spacewatch	HOF	2.6 km	MPC · JPL
389339	2009 SA_{349}	—	September 19, 2009	Mount Lemmon	Mount Lemmon Survey	·	620 m	MPC · JPL
389340	2009 SQ_{351}	—	September 16, 2009	Kitt Peak	Spacewatch	·	640 m	MPC · JPL
389341	2009 SF_{355}	—	September 25, 2009	Kitt Peak	Spacewatch	L4	7.4 km	MPC · JPL
389342	2009 TD_{29}	—	September 5, 2008	Kitt Peak	Spacewatch	L4	7.0 km	MPC · JPL
389343	2009 TS_{31}	—	April 14, 2008	Kitt Peak	Spacewatch	·	720 m	MPC · JPL
389344	2009 TX_{40}	—	October 14, 2009	La Sagra	OAM	·	1.1 km	MPC · JPL
389345	2009 UD_{5}	—	September 29, 2009	Kitt Peak	Spacewatch	·	3.6 km	MPC · JPL
389346	2009 UW_{7}	—	October 16, 2009	Mount Lemmon	Mount Lemmon Survey	3:2	5.8 km	MPC · JPL
389347	2009 UK_{11}	—	September 28, 2009	Mount Lemmon	Mount Lemmon Survey	L4	8.2 km	MPC · JPL
389348	2009 UA_{12}	—	October 16, 2009	Mount Lemmon	Mount Lemmon Survey	NYS	960 m	MPC · JPL
389349	2009 UW_{16}	—	October 18, 2009	La Sagra	OAM	·	1.5 km	MPC · JPL
389350	2009 UL_{30}	—	March 20, 2001	Kitt Peak	Spacewatch	·	3.8 km	MPC · JPL
389351	2009 UL_{53}	—	September 21, 2009	Mount Lemmon	Mount Lemmon Survey	·	890 m	MPC · JPL
389352	2009 UA_{58}	—	October 23, 2009	Mount Lemmon	Mount Lemmon Survey	·	1.4 km	MPC · JPL
389353	2009 UC_{60}	—	September 23, 2009	Mount Lemmon	Mount Lemmon Survey	L4	8.5 km	MPC · JPL
389354	2009 UW_{72}	—	September 22, 2009	Mount Lemmon	Mount Lemmon Survey	·	2.1 km	MPC · JPL
389355	2009 UE_{80}	—	September 3, 2008	Kitt Peak	Spacewatch	L4	7.7 km	MPC · JPL
389356	2009 UZ_{93}	—	October 22, 2009	Catalina	CSS	L4	10 km	MPC · JPL
389357	2009 UZ_{101}	—	October 24, 2009	Catalina	CSS	·	1.1 km	MPC · JPL
389358	2009 UQ_{130}	—	October 25, 2009	Kitt Peak	Spacewatch	(883)	770 m	MPC · JPL
389359	2009 UJ_{153}	—	October 18, 2009	Mount Lemmon	Mount Lemmon Survey	NYS	1.1 km	MPC · JPL
389360	2009 UD_{155}	—	October 26, 2009	Mount Lemmon	Mount Lemmon Survey	L4	9.5 km	MPC · JPL
389361	2009 VS_{1}	—	November 10, 2009	Catalina	CSS	·	1.3 km	MPC · JPL
389362	2009 VG_{5}	—	November 8, 2009	Kitt Peak	Spacewatch	L4	6.8 km	MPC · JPL
389363	2009 VC_{8}	—	November 8, 2009	Catalina	CSS	·	850 m	MPC · JPL
389364	2009 VE_{28}	—	November 8, 2009	Catalina	CSS	·	1.1 km	MPC · JPL
389365	2009 VG_{28}	—	November 8, 2009	Catalina	CSS	·	820 m	MPC · JPL
389366	2009 VH_{28}	—	November 8, 2009	Catalina	CSS	·	970 m	MPC · JPL
389367	2009 VE_{44}	—	November 12, 2009	La Sagra	OAM	·	670 m	MPC · JPL
389368	2009 VZ_{44}	—	November 11, 2009	Socorro	LINEAR	·	820 m	MPC · JPL
389369	2009 VF_{52}	—	November 10, 2009	Kitt Peak	Spacewatch	·	980 m	MPC · JPL
389370	2009 VQ_{71}	—	November 10, 2009	Kitt Peak	Spacewatch	·	1.5 km	MPC · JPL
389371	2009 VH_{101}	—	November 10, 2009	Kitt Peak	Spacewatch	ERI	1.9 km	MPC · JPL
389372	2009 VS_{103}	—	November 11, 2009	Mount Lemmon	Mount Lemmon Survey	V	740 m	MPC · JPL
389373	2009 VU_{113}	—	November 8, 2009	Kitt Peak	Spacewatch	·	1.0 km	MPC · JPL
389374	2009 WE_{2}	—	November 16, 2009	Mount Lemmon	Mount Lemmon Survey	MAS	660 m	MPC · JPL
389375	2009 WD_{24}	—	November 18, 2009	Socorro	LINEAR	·	860 m	MPC · JPL
389376	2009 WX_{28}	—	November 16, 2009	Kitt Peak	Spacewatch	(2076)	970 m	MPC · JPL
389377	2009 WZ_{39}	—	November 17, 2009	Kitt Peak	Spacewatch	·	920 m	MPC · JPL
389378	2009 WB_{45}	—	November 18, 2009	Kitt Peak	Spacewatch	·	640 m	MPC · JPL
389379	2009 WZ_{46}	—	November 18, 2009	Mount Lemmon	Mount Lemmon Survey	·	1.7 km	MPC · JPL
389380	2009 WP_{64}	—	November 16, 2009	Mount Lemmon	Mount Lemmon Survey	·	790 m	MPC · JPL
389381	2009 WB_{87}	—	November 28, 2005	Kitt Peak	Spacewatch	·	1.5 km	MPC · JPL
389382	2009 WW_{88}	—	November 19, 2009	Kitt Peak	Spacewatch	·	1.0 km	MPC · JPL
389383	2009 WO_{130}	—	November 20, 2009	Mount Lemmon	Mount Lemmon Survey	·	980 m	MPC · JPL
389384	2009 WZ_{145}	—	November 19, 2009	Kitt Peak	Spacewatch	·	1.1 km	MPC · JPL
389385	2009 WY_{157}	—	November 20, 2009	Mount Lemmon	Mount Lemmon Survey	·	1.8 km	MPC · JPL
389386	2009 WB_{164}	—	November 21, 2009	Kitt Peak	Spacewatch	·	920 m	MPC · JPL
389387	2009 WQ_{177}	—	September 22, 2009	Mount Lemmon	Mount Lemmon Survey	·	800 m	MPC · JPL
389388	2009 WH_{183}	—	November 23, 2009	Kitt Peak	Spacewatch	·	870 m	MPC · JPL
389389	2009 WG_{220}	—	November 16, 2009	Mount Lemmon	Mount Lemmon Survey	·	680 m	MPC · JPL
389390	2009 WX_{253}	—	November 17, 2009	Kitt Peak	Spacewatch	·	1.4 km	MPC · JPL
389391	2009 WM_{255}	—	November 19, 2009	Mount Lemmon	Mount Lemmon Survey	·	1.3 km	MPC · JPL
389392	2009 WY_{255}	—	November 20, 2009	Mount Lemmon	Mount Lemmon Survey	·	830 m	MPC · JPL
389393	2009 WQ_{261}	—	November 16, 2009	Socorro	LINEAR	·	890 m	MPC · JPL
389394	2009 XS_{1}	—	February 27, 2007	Kitt Peak	Spacewatch	·	1.0 km	MPC · JPL
389395	2009 XA_{3}	—	December 8, 2009	La Sagra	OAM	·	1.0 km	MPC · JPL
389396	2009 XZ_{7}	—	December 15, 2009	Mayhill	Mayhill	HNS	1.2 km	MPC · JPL
389397	2009 XN_{8}	—	December 11, 2009	Dauban	Kugel, F.	·	1.2 km	MPC · JPL
389398	2009 XX_{15}	—	December 15, 2009	Mount Lemmon	Mount Lemmon Survey	V	820 m	MPC · JPL
389399	2009 XQ_{17}	—	December 15, 2009	Mount Lemmon	Mount Lemmon Survey	V	740 m	MPC · JPL
389400	2009 XP_{18}	—	December 15, 2009	Mount Lemmon	Mount Lemmon Survey	EUN	2.0 km	MPC · JPL

== 389401–389500 ==
back to top

Designation			Discovery			Properties		Ref
Permanent	Provisional	Named after	Date	Site	Discoverer(s)	Category	Diam.	Ref
389401	2009 XQ_{22}	—	December 15, 2009	Mount Lemmon	Mount Lemmon Survey	NYS	1.2 km	MPC · JPL
389402	2009 XB_{24}	—	December 21, 2006	Kitt Peak	Spacewatch	·	950 m	MPC · JPL
389403	2009 YE_{25}	—	December 25, 2009	Kitt Peak	Spacewatch	MAS	670 m	MPC · JPL
389404	2010 AM_{5}	—	January 4, 2010	Kitt Peak	Spacewatch	·	1.1 km	MPC · JPL
389405	2010 AM_{12}	—	January 6, 2010	Catalina	CSS	PHO	2.0 km	MPC · JPL
389406	2010 AY_{12}	—	December 19, 2009	Mount Lemmon	Mount Lemmon Survey	·	720 m	MPC · JPL
389407	2010 AT_{18}	—	January 7, 2010	Mount Lemmon	Mount Lemmon Survey	·	1.5 km	MPC · JPL
389408	2010 AT_{21}	—	January 6, 2010	Kitt Peak	Spacewatch	NYS	1.7 km	MPC · JPL
389409	2010 AL_{24}	—	November 21, 2009	Mount Lemmon	Mount Lemmon Survey	·	1.8 km	MPC · JPL
389410	2010 AC_{35}	—	January 7, 2010	Kitt Peak	Spacewatch	·	1.1 km	MPC · JPL
389411	2010 AU_{39}	—	July 30, 2008	Mount Lemmon	Mount Lemmon Survey	·	1.6 km	MPC · JPL
389412	2010 AH_{55}	—	January 8, 2010	Kitt Peak	Spacewatch	NYS	1.1 km	MPC · JPL
389413	2010 AM_{56}	—	December 8, 2005	Kitt Peak	Spacewatch	·	1.4 km	MPC · JPL
389414	2010 AP_{66}	—	February 25, 2006	Kitt Peak	Spacewatch	·	1.2 km	MPC · JPL
389415	2010 AA_{136}	—	January 15, 2010	WISE	WISE	·	2.2 km	MPC · JPL
389416	2010 BY	—	January 17, 2010	Bisei SG Center	BATTeRS	MAS	640 m	MPC · JPL
389417	2010 BO_{34}	—	January 18, 2010	WISE	WISE	·	2.7 km	MPC · JPL
389418	2010 BR_{61}	—	June 17, 2005	Mount Lemmon	Mount Lemmon Survey	L4	13 km	MPC · JPL
389419	2010 BD_{68}	—	January 22, 2010	WISE	WISE	·	3.0 km	MPC · JPL
389420	2010 BU_{88}	—	March 5, 1997	Kitt Peak	Spacewatch	·	1.8 km	MPC · JPL
389421	2010 BP_{127}	—	June 1, 1997	Kitt Peak	Spacewatch	·	3.0 km	MPC · JPL
389422	2010 CR_{3}	—	October 5, 2004	Kitt Peak	Spacewatch	·	1.5 km	MPC · JPL
389423	2010 CJ_{7}	—	February 6, 2010	WISE	WISE	ELF	4.6 km	MPC · JPL
389424	2010 CZ_{8}	—	February 8, 2010	WISE	WISE	·	3.9 km	MPC · JPL
389425	2010 CZ_{11}	—	February 6, 2010	Mayhill	Lowe, A.	V	630 m	MPC · JPL
389426	2010 CK_{17}	—	February 11, 2010	WISE	WISE	·	2.6 km	MPC · JPL
389427	2010 CQ_{20}	—	February 9, 2010	Kitt Peak	Spacewatch	·	1.2 km	MPC · JPL
389428	2010 CF_{23}	—	June 9, 2007	Kitt Peak	Spacewatch	·	1.0 km	MPC · JPL
389429	2010 CK_{29}	—	February 9, 2010	Kitt Peak	Spacewatch	·	1.2 km	MPC · JPL
389430	2010 CW_{30}	—	January 6, 2010	Kitt Peak	Spacewatch	·	2.2 km	MPC · JPL
389431	2010 CO_{36}	—	October 27, 2005	Kitt Peak	Spacewatch	NYS	1.3 km	MPC · JPL
389432	2010 CB_{42}	—	February 6, 2010	Mount Lemmon	Mount Lemmon Survey	·	2.2 km	MPC · JPL
389433	2010 CG_{54}	—	February 14, 2010	WISE	WISE	·	2.5 km	MPC · JPL
389434	2010 CX_{63}	—	January 12, 2010	Mount Lemmon	Mount Lemmon Survey	PHO	1.9 km	MPC · JPL
389435	2010 CH_{73}	—	January 11, 2010	Kitt Peak	Spacewatch	NYS	1.2 km	MPC · JPL
389436	2010 CW_{75}	—	January 15, 2010	Mount Lemmon	Mount Lemmon Survey	·	2.8 km	MPC · JPL
389437	2010 CH_{81}	—	February 13, 2010	Mount Lemmon	Mount Lemmon Survey	·	2.0 km	MPC · JPL
389438	2010 CF_{94}	—	February 6, 2006	Mount Lemmon	Mount Lemmon Survey	·	1.2 km	MPC · JPL
389439	2010 CQ_{94}	—	February 14, 2010	Kitt Peak	Spacewatch	·	1.1 km	MPC · JPL
389440	2010 CM_{101}	—	January 27, 2006	Mount Lemmon	Mount Lemmon Survey	·	980 m	MPC · JPL
389441	2010 CK_{102}	—	February 14, 2010	Mount Lemmon	Mount Lemmon Survey	MAS	730 m	MPC · JPL
389442	2010 CF_{138}	—	February 9, 2010	Kitt Peak	Spacewatch	·	1.5 km	MPC · JPL
389443	2010 CV_{144}	—	June 7, 2003	Kitt Peak	Spacewatch	·	1.5 km	MPC · JPL
389444	2010 CP_{152}	—	February 14, 2010	Kitt Peak	Spacewatch	·	1.5 km	MPC · JPL
389445	2010 CR_{177}	—	February 10, 2010	Kitt Peak	Spacewatch	·	1.2 km	MPC · JPL
389446	2010 CL_{178}	—	April 25, 2006	Kitt Peak	Spacewatch	EUN	1.1 km	MPC · JPL
389447	2010 CL_{181}	—	February 14, 2010	Haleakala	Pan-STARRS 1	·	1.0 km	MPC · JPL
389448	2010 CJ_{182}	—	February 14, 2010	Haleakala	Pan-STARRS 1	·	1.7 km	MPC · JPL
389449	2010 CG_{183}	—	February 13, 2010	Kitt Peak	Spacewatch	·	1.9 km	MPC · JPL
389450	2010 CP_{185}	—	September 23, 2008	Mount Lemmon	Mount Lemmon Survey	·	1.2 km	MPC · JPL
389451	2010 CU_{196}	—	January 31, 2009	Mount Lemmon	Mount Lemmon Survey	EUP	6.2 km	MPC · JPL
389452	2010 CA_{228}	—	February 9, 2010	WISE	WISE	·	4.8 km	MPC · JPL
389453	2010 DW_{4}	—	February 16, 2010	Mount Lemmon	Mount Lemmon Survey	·	2.3 km	MPC · JPL
389454	2010 DX_{8}	—	February 16, 2010	Kitt Peak	Spacewatch	·	3.2 km	MPC · JPL
389455	2010 DQ_{18}	—	February 16, 2010	WISE	WISE	·	3.0 km	MPC · JPL
389456	2010 DT_{21}	—	November 19, 2009	Mount Lemmon	Mount Lemmon Survey	·	1.7 km	MPC · JPL
389457	2010 DX_{39}	—	February 16, 2010	Catalina	CSS	·	4.9 km	MPC · JPL
389458	2010 DZ_{41}	—	October 17, 2008	Kitt Peak	Spacewatch	·	1.2 km	MPC · JPL
389459	2010 DL_{45}	—	February 17, 2010	Kitt Peak	Spacewatch	EUN	1.2 km	MPC · JPL
389460	2010 DL_{46}	—	January 7, 2006	Kitt Peak	Spacewatch	·	1.1 km	MPC · JPL
389461	2010 DY_{63}	—	February 26, 2010	WISE	WISE	·	2.7 km	MPC · JPL
389462	2010 DM_{76}	—	April 28, 2003	Kitt Peak	Spacewatch	·	1.8 km	MPC · JPL
389463	2010 DZ_{76}	—	October 22, 2003	Kitt Peak	Spacewatch	·	2.4 km	MPC · JPL
389464	2010 EY_{31}	—	March 4, 2010	Kitt Peak	Spacewatch	·	1.3 km	MPC · JPL
389465	2010 EY_{39}	—	March 11, 2010	La Sagra	OAM	·	2.4 km	MPC · JPL
389466	2010 ED_{41}	—	March 4, 2010	Kitt Peak	Spacewatch	·	1.8 km	MPC · JPL
389467	2010 EU_{42}	—	March 9, 2010	La Sagra	OAM	EUN	1.4 km	MPC · JPL
389468	2010 ER_{44}	—	March 12, 2010	Calvin-Rehoboth	Calvin College	BRG	1.5 km	MPC · JPL
389469	2010 EG_{45}	—	February 15, 2010	Catalina	CSS	BAR	1.9 km	MPC · JPL
389470 Jan	2010 ER_{45}	Jan	March 15, 2010	SM Montmagastrell	Bosch, J. M.	EUN	1.1 km	MPC · JPL
389471	2010 ES_{45}	—	March 15, 2010	Dauban	Kugel, F.	·	1.8 km	MPC · JPL
389472	2010 EL_{66}	—	March 10, 2010	Moletai	K. Černis, Zdanavicius, J.	(1547)	1.7 km	MPC · JPL
389473	2010 EK_{69}	—	March 13, 2010	Kitt Peak	Spacewatch	·	2.2 km	MPC · JPL
389474	2010 ET_{70}	—	March 12, 2010	Kitt Peak	Spacewatch	·	1.5 km	MPC · JPL
389475	2010 EQ_{81}	—	March 12, 2010	Kitt Peak	Spacewatch	·	1.2 km	MPC · JPL
389476	2010 EL_{82}	—	March 12, 2010	Mount Lemmon	Mount Lemmon Survey	·	1.9 km	MPC · JPL
389477	2010 EL_{87}	—	March 13, 2010	Kitt Peak	Spacewatch	·	1.9 km	MPC · JPL
389478 Rivera-Valentín	2010 ER_{87}	Rivera-Valentín	March 13, 2010	Kitt Peak	Spacewatch	ADE	2.0 km	MPC · JPL
389479	2010 EO_{89}	—	April 18, 2002	Kitt Peak	Spacewatch	·	1.5 km	MPC · JPL
389480	2010 EA_{99}	—	May 9, 2006	Mount Lemmon	Mount Lemmon Survey	·	1.3 km	MPC · JPL
389481	2010 EA_{100}	—	March 14, 2010	Kitt Peak	Spacewatch	·	1.1 km	MPC · JPL
389482	2010 EB_{107}	—	March 12, 2010	Kitt Peak	Spacewatch	·	1.6 km	MPC · JPL
389483	2010 EB_{110}	—	March 4, 2010	Kitt Peak	Spacewatch	·	2.1 km	MPC · JPL
389484	2010 EF_{110}	—	March 4, 2010	Kitt Peak	Spacewatch	·	2.0 km	MPC · JPL
389485	2010 EW_{127}	—	March 14, 2010	Catalina	CSS	·	3.9 km	MPC · JPL
389486	2010 ED_{130}	—	March 13, 2010	Kitt Peak	Spacewatch	·	1.6 km	MPC · JPL
389487	2010 EL_{131}	—	September 15, 2007	Kitt Peak	Spacewatch	·	1.5 km	MPC · JPL
389488	2010 EN_{131}	—	March 15, 2010	Kitt Peak	Spacewatch	MAR	1.2 km	MPC · JPL
389489	2010 EV_{139}	—	March 12, 2010	Kitt Peak	Spacewatch	·	1.8 km	MPC · JPL
389490	2010 EC_{172}	—	February 27, 2006	Mount Lemmon	Mount Lemmon Survey	·	1.8 km	MPC · JPL
389491	2010 FX_{1}	—	April 21, 2006	Kitt Peak	Spacewatch	·	1.6 km	MPC · JPL
389492	2010 FW_{3}	—	March 16, 2010	Mount Lemmon	Mount Lemmon Survey	·	2.4 km	MPC · JPL
389493	2010 FR_{5}	—	March 14, 2010	Kitt Peak	Spacewatch	·	1.2 km	MPC · JPL
389494	2010 FJ_{6}	—	August 16, 2007	XuYi	PMO NEO Survey Program	·	1.2 km	MPC · JPL
389495	2010 FX_{16}	—	March 18, 2010	Kitt Peak	Spacewatch	·	1.6 km	MPC · JPL
389496	2010 FP_{17}	—	December 25, 2005	Mount Lemmon	Mount Lemmon Survey	·	1.2 km	MPC · JPL
389497	2010 FG_{22}	—	February 14, 2010	Kitt Peak	Spacewatch	·	1.5 km	MPC · JPL
389498	2010 FW_{25}	—	September 18, 2003	Kitt Peak	Spacewatch	·	1.3 km	MPC · JPL
389499	2010 FG_{30}	—	March 18, 2010	Kitt Peak	Spacewatch	EOS	3.2 km	MPC · JPL
389500	2010 FU_{84}	—	March 18, 2010	Mount Lemmon	Mount Lemmon Survey	·	4.2 km	MPC · JPL

== 389501–389600 ==
back to top

Designation			Discovery			Properties		Ref
Permanent	Provisional	Named after	Date	Site	Discoverer(s)	Category	Diam.	Ref
389501	2010 FJ_{87}	—	March 16, 2010	Mount Lemmon	Mount Lemmon Survey	HNS	1.4 km	MPC · JPL
389502	2010 FL_{88}	—	March 25, 2010	Mount Lemmon	Mount Lemmon Survey	·	2.2 km	MPC · JPL
389503	2010 FW_{92}	—	March 16, 2010	Catalina	CSS	·	3.4 km	MPC · JPL
389504	2010 FJ_{101}	—	March 26, 2010	Kitt Peak	Spacewatch	·	1.7 km	MPC · JPL
389505	2010 GG_{6}	—	April 4, 2010	Kitt Peak	Spacewatch	·	2.4 km	MPC · JPL
389506	2010 GN_{25}	—	April 8, 2010	Mayhill	Lowe, A.	JUN	1.1 km	MPC · JPL
389507	2010 GO_{27}	—	April 5, 2010	Kitt Peak	Spacewatch	·	1.6 km	MPC · JPL
389508	2010 GY_{101}	—	April 5, 2010	Kitt Peak	Spacewatch	·	1.8 km	MPC · JPL
389509	2010 GM_{107}	—	September 27, 2003	Kitt Peak	Spacewatch	·	1.7 km	MPC · JPL
389510	2010 GP_{110}	—	October 1, 2003	Kitt Peak	Spacewatch	·	2.1 km	MPC · JPL
389511	2010 GO_{113}	—	April 10, 2010	Kitt Peak	Spacewatch	·	1.4 km	MPC · JPL
389512	2010 GE_{120}	—	April 11, 2010	Kitt Peak	Spacewatch	NEM	2.8 km	MPC · JPL
389513	2010 GO_{121}	—	April 6, 2010	Kitt Peak	Spacewatch	·	1.6 km	MPC · JPL
389514	2010 GZ_{132}	—	February 16, 2010	Mount Lemmon	Mount Lemmon Survey	·	2.5 km	MPC · JPL
389515	2010 GK_{136}	—	April 5, 2010	Catalina	CSS	·	1.9 km	MPC · JPL
389516	2010 GY_{139}	—	October 25, 2008	Kitt Peak	Spacewatch	·	1.5 km	MPC · JPL
389517	2010 GH_{141}	—	March 17, 2010	Siding Spring	SSS	·	3.1 km	MPC · JPL
389518	2010 GX_{144}	—	October 2, 2003	Kitt Peak	Spacewatch	·	1.9 km	MPC · JPL
389519	2010 GD_{146}	—	April 7, 2010	Sandlot	G. Hug	·	3.2 km	MPC · JPL
389520	2010 GT_{157}	—	April 11, 2010	Kitt Peak	Spacewatch	·	2.3 km	MPC · JPL
389521	2010 GT_{158}	—	April 15, 2010	Catalina	CSS	·	3.2 km	MPC · JPL
389522	2010 GB_{161}	—	April 6, 2010	Bergisch Gladbach	W. Bickel	·	2.4 km	MPC · JPL
389523	2010 HW_{96}	—	April 30, 2010	WISE	WISE	·	2.8 km	MPC · JPL
389524	2010 HR_{104}	—	April 20, 2010	Kitt Peak	Spacewatch	·	1.8 km	MPC · JPL
389525	2010 JU_{1}	—	May 3, 2010	Kitt Peak	Spacewatch	JUN	1.0 km	MPC · JPL
389526	2010 JG_{29}	—	October 9, 2007	Kitt Peak	Spacewatch	·	1.7 km	MPC · JPL
389527	2010 JF_{38}	—	April 3, 2010	Kitt Peak	Spacewatch	·	2.6 km	MPC · JPL
389528	2010 JH_{40}	—	March 21, 2010	Mount Lemmon	Mount Lemmon Survey	·	1.9 km	MPC · JPL
389529	2010 JZ_{46}	—	September 21, 2003	Kitt Peak	Spacewatch	RAF	1.1 km	MPC · JPL
389530	2010 JC_{63}	—	May 8, 2010	WISE	WISE	·	2.9 km	MPC · JPL
389531	2010 JP_{68}	—	May 9, 2010	WISE	WISE	·	4.0 km	MPC · JPL
389532	2010 JK_{72}	—	January 20, 2009	Mount Lemmon	Mount Lemmon Survey	·	2.3 km	MPC · JPL
389533	2010 JU_{75}	—	May 5, 2010	Catalina	CSS	·	2.0 km	MPC · JPL
389534	2010 JS_{77}	—	May 6, 2010	Mount Lemmon	Mount Lemmon Survey	·	2.0 km	MPC · JPL
389535	2010 JJ_{80}	—	April 2, 2006	Mount Lemmon	Mount Lemmon Survey	·	1.3 km	MPC · JPL
389536	2010 JC_{149}	—	December 1, 2008	Kitt Peak	Spacewatch	·	2.3 km	MPC · JPL
389537	2010 JE_{149}	—	May 20, 2005	Mount Lemmon	Mount Lemmon Survey	·	2.8 km	MPC · JPL
389538	2010 JW_{163}	—	January 2, 2009	Kitt Peak	Spacewatch	AST	1.6 km	MPC · JPL
389539	2010 KN_{38}	—	May 4, 2010	Kitt Peak	Spacewatch	EOS	2.1 km	MPC · JPL
389540	2010 KH_{66}	—	May 24, 2010	WISE	WISE	T_{j} (2.98)	4.6 km	MPC · JPL
389541	2010 KH_{110}	—	May 29, 2010	WISE	WISE	URS	3.4 km	MPC · JPL
389542	2010 KG_{117}	—	May 21, 2010	Mount Lemmon	Mount Lemmon Survey	·	1.6 km	MPC · JPL
389543	2010 LY_{36}	—	June 6, 2010	WISE	WISE	·	3.1 km	MPC · JPL
389544	2010 LZ_{82}	—	June 11, 2010	WISE	WISE	·	4.8 km	MPC · JPL
389545	2010 LL_{133}	—	October 15, 2007	Mount Lemmon	Mount Lemmon Survey	·	1.3 km	MPC · JPL
389546	2010 MF_{87}	—	February 23, 2007	Kitt Peak	Spacewatch	ULA · CYB	5.7 km	MPC · JPL
389547	2010 MH_{89}	—	June 27, 2010	WISE	WISE	·	3.7 km	MPC · JPL
389548	2010 OY_{67}	—	July 24, 2010	WISE	WISE	DOR	3.1 km	MPC · JPL
389549	2010 OD_{70}	—	September 30, 1999	Kitt Peak	Spacewatch	·	4.6 km	MPC · JPL
389550	2010 PB_{10}	—	August 4, 2010	Socorro	LINEAR	·	4.1 km	MPC · JPL
389551	2010 PU_{19}	—	April 29, 2003	Kitt Peak	Spacewatch	·	3.8 km	MPC · JPL
389552	2010 RA_{81}	—	September 29, 1997	Kitt Peak	Spacewatch	H	540 m	MPC · JPL
389553	2010 RY_{113}	—	September 7, 2004	Socorro	LINEAR	TIR	3.5 km	MPC · JPL
389554	2010 RK_{126}	—	March 11, 2007	Kitt Peak	Spacewatch	·	3.2 km	MPC · JPL
389555	2010 RY_{159}	—	March 28, 2008	Mount Lemmon	Mount Lemmon Survey	·	2.9 km	MPC · JPL
389556	2010 SD_{6}	—	September 16, 2010	Mount Lemmon	Mount Lemmon Survey	L4	7.8 km	MPC · JPL
389557	2010 UB_{12}	—	July 27, 2010	WISE	WISE	·	3.6 km	MPC · JPL
389558	2010 UX_{25}	—	September 17, 2009	Kitt Peak	Spacewatch	L4	9.1 km	MPC · JPL
389559	2010 UW_{33}	—	August 27, 2009	Kitt Peak	Spacewatch	L4	7.7 km	MPC · JPL
389560	2010 UN_{93}	—	September 18, 2009	Kitt Peak	Spacewatch	L4 · ERY	7.2 km	MPC · JPL
389561	2010 UV_{97}	—	October 16, 2009	Mount Lemmon	Mount Lemmon Survey	L4	9.1 km	MPC · JPL
389562	2010 VR_{38}	—	May 14, 2005	Mount Lemmon	Mount Lemmon Survey	L4	10 km	MPC · JPL
389563	2010 VO_{46}	—	October 13, 2010	Mount Lemmon	Mount Lemmon Survey	L4	8.8 km	MPC · JPL
389564	2010 VK_{47}	—	October 16, 2009	Catalina	CSS	L4	8.5 km	MPC · JPL
389565	2010 VR_{109}	—	September 15, 2009	Kitt Peak	Spacewatch	L4	7.1 km	MPC · JPL
389566	2010 VN_{138}	—	August 10, 2010	WISE	WISE	L4	10 km	MPC · JPL
389567	2010 VQ_{141}	—	November 6, 2010	Mount Lemmon	Mount Lemmon Survey	L4	7.6 km	MPC · JPL
389568	2010 VQ_{149}	—	April 7, 2003	Kitt Peak	Spacewatch	L4	8.0 km	MPC · JPL
389569	2010 VG_{157}	—	October 13, 2010	Mount Lemmon	Mount Lemmon Survey	L4	8.0 km	MPC · JPL
389570	2010 VQ_{170}	—	September 21, 2009	Kitt Peak	Spacewatch	L4	8.5 km	MPC · JPL
389571	2010 VZ_{202}	—	September 27, 1997	Kitt Peak	Spacewatch	L4	9.4 km	MPC · JPL
389572	2010 WN_{4}	—	September 18, 2009	Kitt Peak	Spacewatch	L4	7.2 km	MPC · JPL
389573	2010 WN_{10}	—	September 17, 2009	Kitt Peak	Spacewatch	L4	8.2 km	MPC · JPL
389574	2010 WF_{53}	—	October 29, 2010	Kitt Peak	Spacewatch	L4	10 km	MPC · JPL
389575	2010 XP_{41}	—	October 16, 2009	Mount Lemmon	Mount Lemmon Survey	L4	7.3 km	MPC · JPL
389576	2011 AF	—	March 26, 2008	Kitt Peak	Spacewatch	·	1.0 km	MPC · JPL
389577	2011 AV_{15}	—	August 13, 2004	Campo Imperatore	CINEOS	H	590 m	MPC · JPL
389578	2011 AP_{73}	—	February 1, 2010	WISE	WISE	EUP	4.4 km	MPC · JPL
389579	2011 BM_{22}	—	August 25, 2001	Anderson Mesa	LONEOS	H	540 m	MPC · JPL
389580	2011 CU_{2}	—	December 14, 2010	Mount Lemmon	Mount Lemmon Survey	H	830 m	MPC · JPL
389581	2011 DJ_{17}	—	October 16, 2009	Catalina	CSS	·	1.4 km	MPC · JPL
389582	2011 DY_{40}	—	October 18, 2006	Kitt Peak	Spacewatch	·	640 m	MPC · JPL
389583	2011 EP_{22}	—	January 8, 2011	Mount Lemmon	Mount Lemmon Survey	·	2.6 km	MPC · JPL
389584	2011 EX_{71}	—	December 31, 1999	Kitt Peak	Spacewatch	·	760 m	MPC · JPL
389585	2011 FL_{16}	—	June 10, 2008	Kitt Peak	Spacewatch	·	760 m	MPC · JPL
389586	2011 FS_{28}	—	February 25, 2011	Mount Lemmon	Mount Lemmon Survey	·	1.4 km	MPC · JPL
389587	2011 FR_{56}	—	March 27, 2011	Kitt Peak	Spacewatch	·	690 m	MPC · JPL
389588	2011 FH_{126}	—	May 5, 2008	Mount Lemmon	Mount Lemmon Survey	·	1.5 km	MPC · JPL
389589	2011 FG_{129}	—	October 2, 1997	Caussols	ODAS	·	4.6 km	MPC · JPL
389590	2011 FQ_{141}	—	March 26, 2011	Kitt Peak	Spacewatch	·	820 m	MPC · JPL
389591	2011 FB_{154}	—	November 10, 2009	Kitt Peak	Spacewatch	·	810 m	MPC · JPL
389592	2011 GW_{16}	—	September 16, 2009	Mount Lemmon	Mount Lemmon Survey	·	870 m	MPC · JPL
389593	2011 GM_{17}	—	February 8, 2007	Mount Lemmon	Mount Lemmon Survey	·	1.1 km	MPC · JPL
389594	2011 GL_{31}	—	April 1, 2011	Kitt Peak	Spacewatch	·	580 m	MPC · JPL
389595	2011 GT_{32}	—	October 1, 2005	Kitt Peak	Spacewatch	·	690 m	MPC · JPL
389596	2011 GX_{51}	—	March 11, 2011	Kitt Peak	Spacewatch	·	930 m	MPC · JPL
389597	2011 GA_{70}	—	April 13, 2011	Kitt Peak	Spacewatch	·	670 m	MPC · JPL
389598	2011 GJ_{70}	—	November 12, 2005	Kitt Peak	Spacewatch	V	780 m	MPC · JPL
389599	2011 GH_{73}	—	December 29, 2003	Kitt Peak	Spacewatch	·	620 m	MPC · JPL
389600	2011 GS_{74}	—	April 4, 2011	Kitt Peak	Spacewatch	·	770 m	MPC · JPL

== 389601–389700 ==
back to top

Designation			Discovery			Properties		Ref
Permanent	Provisional	Named after	Date	Site	Discoverer(s)	Category	Diam.	Ref
389601	2011 GO_{80}	—	April 2, 2011	Kitt Peak	Spacewatch	·	700 m	MPC · JPL
389602	2011 GB_{84}	—	August 31, 2005	Kitt Peak	Spacewatch	·	710 m	MPC · JPL
389603	2011 HX_{5}	—	April 12, 2011	Catalina	CSS	·	790 m	MPC · JPL
389604	2011 HG_{9}	—	May 7, 2008	Mount Lemmon	Mount Lemmon Survey	·	700 m	MPC · JPL
389605	2011 HL_{14}	—	March 1, 2011	Mount Lemmon	Mount Lemmon Survey	·	1.0 km	MPC · JPL
389606	2011 HN_{21}	—	May 11, 1996	Kitt Peak	Spacewatch	·	1.2 km	MPC · JPL
389607	2011 HW_{21}	—	October 25, 2005	Kitt Peak	Spacewatch	·	1.4 km	MPC · JPL
389608	2011 HU_{22}	—	August 29, 2005	Kitt Peak	Spacewatch	·	700 m	MPC · JPL
389609	2011 HF_{23}	—	May 13, 2004	Kitt Peak	Spacewatch	V	580 m	MPC · JPL
389610	2011 HZ_{24}	—	April 27, 2011	Kitt Peak	Spacewatch	·	690 m	MPC · JPL
389611	2011 HT_{30}	—	March 15, 2007	Mount Lemmon	Mount Lemmon Survey	·	1.4 km	MPC · JPL
389612	2011 HU_{33}	—	April 13, 2011	Kitt Peak	Spacewatch	·	680 m	MPC · JPL
389613	2011 HR_{42}	—	April 6, 2011	Mount Lemmon	Mount Lemmon Survey	·	1.3 km	MPC · JPL
389614	2011 HN_{44}	—	November 21, 2009	Mount Lemmon	Mount Lemmon Survey	WIT	1.2 km	MPC · JPL
389615	2011 HM_{49}	—	June 2, 2008	Mount Lemmon	Mount Lemmon Survey	·	540 m	MPC · JPL
389616	2011 HD_{58}	—	April 24, 2007	Kitt Peak	Spacewatch	·	1.9 km	MPC · JPL
389617	2011 HM_{74}	—	March 14, 2004	Kitt Peak	Spacewatch	·	860 m	MPC · JPL
389618	2011 HH_{75}	—	April 29, 2008	Mount Lemmon	Mount Lemmon Survey	·	550 m	MPC · JPL
389619	2011 HB_{79}	—	January 27, 2007	Mount Lemmon	Mount Lemmon Survey	PHO	880 m	MPC · JPL
389620	2011 HN_{82}	—	August 30, 2005	Kitt Peak	Spacewatch	·	710 m	MPC · JPL
389621	2011 HT_{82}	—	October 29, 1999	Kitt Peak	Spacewatch	·	890 m	MPC · JPL
389622	2011 HU_{90}	—	April 2, 2006	Kitt Peak	Spacewatch	·	1.8 km	MPC · JPL
389623	2011 HM_{91}	—	October 23, 2008	Kitt Peak	Spacewatch	·	1.8 km	MPC · JPL
389624	2011 HS_{92}	—	January 17, 2007	Kitt Peak	Spacewatch	·	690 m	MPC · JPL
389625	2011 JR_{4}	—	October 31, 2005	Mount Lemmon	Mount Lemmon Survey	·	1.3 km	MPC · JPL
389626	2011 JV_{25}	—	April 27, 2011	Kitt Peak	Spacewatch	·	1.6 km	MPC · JPL
389627	2011 JA_{28}	—	May 12, 2011	Mount Lemmon	Mount Lemmon Survey	·	1.2 km	MPC · JPL
389628	2011 JB_{28}	—	October 30, 2005	Kitt Peak	Spacewatch	·	900 m	MPC · JPL
389629	2011 JV_{29}	—	September 6, 2008	Catalina	CSS	·	830 m	MPC · JPL
389630	2011 JX_{29}	—	September 2, 2008	Kitt Peak	Spacewatch	·	810 m	MPC · JPL
389631	2011 KR_{5}	—	November 21, 2009	Mount Lemmon	Mount Lemmon Survey	·	820 m	MPC · JPL
389632	2011 KS_{7}	—	March 26, 2006	Kitt Peak	Spacewatch	HOF	4.0 km	MPC · JPL
389633	2011 KT_{14}	—	April 29, 2011	Mount Lemmon	Mount Lemmon Survey	·	1.4 km	MPC · JPL
389634	2011 KA_{26}	—	April 30, 2011	Mount Lemmon	Mount Lemmon Survey	·	570 m	MPC · JPL
389635	2011 KQ_{29}	—	August 28, 1995	Kitt Peak	Spacewatch	·	610 m	MPC · JPL
389636	2011 KE_{31}	—	October 25, 2005	Kitt Peak	Spacewatch	·	1.5 km	MPC · JPL
389637	2011 KU_{34}	—	August 7, 2008	Kitt Peak	Spacewatch	·	770 m	MPC · JPL
389638	2011 KX_{43}	—	April 11, 2011	Mount Lemmon	Mount Lemmon Survey	·	2.6 km	MPC · JPL
389639	2011 KH_{46}	—	September 23, 2005	Kitt Peak	Spacewatch	·	890 m	MPC · JPL
389640	2011 KX_{47}	—	September 4, 2008	Kitt Peak	Spacewatch	·	1.1 km	MPC · JPL
389641	2011 LM_{4}	—	July 29, 2008	Mount Lemmon	Mount Lemmon Survey	·	610 m	MPC · JPL
389642	2011 LD_{5}	—	April 15, 2007	Catalina	CSS	·	1.4 km	MPC · JPL
389643	2011 LN_{5}	—	December 27, 2006	Mount Lemmon	Mount Lemmon Survey	V	730 m	MPC · JPL
389644	2011 LC_{16}	—	May 15, 2004	Socorro	LINEAR	·	870 m	MPC · JPL
389645	2011 LH_{19}	—	September 28, 2006	Catalina	CSS	EOS	2.7 km	MPC · JPL
389646	2011 MH	—	June 3, 2000	Kitt Peak	Spacewatch	·	1.4 km	MPC · JPL
389647	2011 MR_{4}	—	June 4, 2010	Nogales	M. Schwartz, P. R. Holvorcem	·	3.6 km	MPC · JPL
389648	2011 MS_{6}	—	February 10, 2007	Mount Lemmon	Mount Lemmon Survey	·	690 m	MPC · JPL
389649	2011 NW_{3}	—	April 6, 2010	Catalina	CSS	·	3.4 km	MPC · JPL
389650	2011 OB_{3}	—	February 21, 2006	Mount Lemmon	Mount Lemmon Survey	·	1.8 km	MPC · JPL
389651	2011 OW_{13}	—	October 16, 2006	Catalina	CSS	·	2.6 km	MPC · JPL
389652	2011 OK_{14}	—	September 27, 1998	Kitt Peak	Spacewatch	·	1.7 km	MPC · JPL
389653	2011 OT_{14}	—	October 23, 2008	Kitt Peak	Spacewatch	·	1.5 km	MPC · JPL
389654	2011 OE_{27}	—	September 28, 2000	Kitt Peak	Spacewatch	MAS	920 m	MPC · JPL
389655	2011 OG_{28}	—	March 6, 2003	Socorro	LINEAR	·	1.3 km	MPC · JPL
389656	2011 OZ_{39}	—	June 10, 2011	Mount Lemmon	Mount Lemmon Survey	·	4.2 km	MPC · JPL
389657	2011 OA_{40}	—	September 14, 2007	Kitt Peak	Spacewatch	EUN	950 m	MPC · JPL
389658	2011 OG_{46}	—	March 15, 2007	Catalina	CSS	·	1.0 km	MPC · JPL
389659	2011 OD_{50}	—	October 8, 2007	Kitt Peak	Spacewatch	·	1.7 km	MPC · JPL
389660	2011 OE_{51}	—	December 19, 2004	Mount Lemmon	Mount Lemmon Survey	MAS	1.0 km	MPC · JPL
389661	2011 OY_{52}	—	June 21, 2011	Kitt Peak	Spacewatch	·	3.5 km	MPC · JPL
389662	2011 OH_{56}	—	October 27, 2008	Kitt Peak	Spacewatch	NYS	1.4 km	MPC · JPL
389663	2011 OT_{56}	—	October 10, 2007	Mount Lemmon	Mount Lemmon Survey	·	2.5 km	MPC · JPL
389664	2011 OZ_{57}	—	November 1, 2008	Mount Lemmon	Mount Lemmon Survey	·	1.5 km	MPC · JPL
389665	2011 OA_{59}	—	December 17, 2003	Kitt Peak	Spacewatch	·	2.6 km	MPC · JPL
389666	2011 PP_{2}	—	November 23, 2008	Kitt Peak	Spacewatch	·	2.6 km	MPC · JPL
389667	2011 PR_{4}	—	November 28, 2000	Kitt Peak	Spacewatch	NYS	1.7 km	MPC · JPL
389668	2011 PE_{8}	—	September 22, 2003	Anderson Mesa	LONEOS	(5)	1.4 km	MPC · JPL
389669	2011 PU_{8}	—	August 24, 2007	Kitt Peak	Spacewatch	·	1.3 km	MPC · JPL
389670	2011 PF_{9}	—	November 19, 2007	Kitt Peak	Spacewatch	AGN	1.2 km	MPC · JPL
389671	2011 PW_{9}	—	August 20, 2003	Campo Imperatore	CINEOS	·	1.4 km	MPC · JPL
389672	2011 PC_{11}	—	January 31, 2009	Mount Lemmon	Mount Lemmon Survey	·	3.8 km	MPC · JPL
389673	2011 PC_{12}	—	February 2, 2006	Kitt Peak	Spacewatch	·	1.4 km	MPC · JPL
389674	2011 PS_{13}	—	January 23, 2006	Kitt Peak	Spacewatch	NYS	1.4 km	MPC · JPL
389675	2011 PZ_{13}	—	October 5, 2007	Kitt Peak	Spacewatch	·	1.4 km	MPC · JPL
389676	2011 QV_{4}	—	February 17, 2010	Kitt Peak	Spacewatch	·	1.4 km	MPC · JPL
389677	2011 QT_{7}	—	May 9, 2006	Mount Lemmon	Mount Lemmon Survey	·	1.7 km	MPC · JPL
389678	2011 QA_{9}	—	December 19, 2007	Mount Lemmon	Mount Lemmon Survey	·	3.4 km	MPC · JPL
389679	2011 QB_{9}	—	January 25, 2009	Kitt Peak	Spacewatch	·	2.0 km	MPC · JPL
389680	2011 QC_{16}	—	September 15, 2007	Anderson Mesa	LONEOS	MAR	1.4 km	MPC · JPL
389681	2011 QA_{17}	—	February 28, 2009	Kitt Peak	Spacewatch	·	2.7 km	MPC · JPL
389682	2011 QN_{17}	—	March 8, 2005	Mount Lemmon	Mount Lemmon Survey	·	2.3 km	MPC · JPL
389683	2011 QY_{20}	—	October 11, 2006	Kitt Peak	Spacewatch	·	1.9 km	MPC · JPL
389684	2011 QJ_{26}	—	March 3, 2009	Kitt Peak	Spacewatch	·	2.7 km	MPC · JPL
389685	2011 QD_{28}	—	January 23, 2006	Kitt Peak	Spacewatch	·	1.8 km	MPC · JPL
389686	2011 QR_{28}	—	October 19, 2006	Catalina	CSS	·	3.7 km	MPC · JPL
389687	2011 QF_{29}	—	December 18, 2007	Mount Lemmon	Mount Lemmon Survey	VER	2.7 km	MPC · JPL
389688	2011 QW_{32}	—	January 19, 2009	Mount Lemmon	Mount Lemmon Survey	EOS	2.3 km	MPC · JPL
389689	2011 QH_{34}	—	November 3, 2007	Kitt Peak	Spacewatch	·	2.6 km	MPC · JPL
389690	2011 QP_{38}	—	August 23, 2001	Kitt Peak	Spacewatch	·	2.5 km	MPC · JPL
389691	2011 QT_{39}	—	April 19, 2006	Kitt Peak	Spacewatch	·	1.5 km	MPC · JPL
389692	2011 QE_{40}	—	April 7, 1995	Kitt Peak	Spacewatch	·	1.7 km	MPC · JPL
389693	2011 QG_{44}	—	October 8, 2007	Mount Lemmon	Mount Lemmon Survey	MAR	1.2 km	MPC · JPL
389694	2011 QD_{48}	—	August 30, 2011	Siding Spring	SSS	APO +1km · PHA	450 m	MPC · JPL
389695	2011 QJ_{49}	—	March 30, 2010	WISE	WISE	URS	3.4 km	MPC · JPL
389696	2011 QK_{52}	—	February 20, 2009	Kitt Peak	Spacewatch	·	3.1 km	MPC · JPL
389697	2011 QY_{61}	—	April 11, 1996	Kitt Peak	Spacewatch	·	3.2 km	MPC · JPL
389698	2011 QK_{77}	—	March 6, 2006	Kitt Peak	Spacewatch	·	900 m	MPC · JPL
389699	2011 QZ_{77}	—	November 19, 2007	Kitt Peak	Spacewatch	AGN	1.3 km	MPC · JPL
389700	2011 QD_{78}	—	March 6, 2008	Mount Lemmon	Mount Lemmon Survey	·	3.0 km	MPC · JPL

== 389701–389800 ==
back to top

Designation			Discovery			Properties		Ref
Permanent	Provisional	Named after	Date	Site	Discoverer(s)	Category	Diam.	Ref
389701	2011 QC_{79}	—	June 20, 2006	Mount Lemmon	Mount Lemmon Survey	KOR	1.4 km	MPC · JPL
389702	2011 QA_{80}	—	March 19, 2010	Mount Lemmon	Mount Lemmon Survey	·	2.3 km	MPC · JPL
389703	2011 QA_{88}	—	September 24, 2007	Kitt Peak	Spacewatch	·	3.4 km	MPC · JPL
389704	2011 QH_{90}	—	February 3, 2009	Kitt Peak	Spacewatch	·	2.2 km	MPC · JPL
389705	2011 QC_{94}	—	October 9, 2007	Mount Lemmon	Mount Lemmon Survey	·	1.9 km	MPC · JPL
389706	2011 QB_{98}	—	January 18, 2009	Kitt Peak	Spacewatch	·	3.9 km	MPC · JPL
389707	2011 RC_{2}	—	February 27, 2009	Kitt Peak	Spacewatch	·	2.0 km	MPC · JPL
389708	2011 RV_{6}	—	February 9, 2003	Kitt Peak	Spacewatch	·	2.8 km	MPC · JPL
389709	2011 RJ_{9}	—	October 2, 2006	Catalina	CSS	·	3.7 km	MPC · JPL
389710	2011 RZ_{9}	—	February 15, 2010	Mount Lemmon	Mount Lemmon Survey	V	830 m	MPC · JPL
389711	2011 RE_{17}	—	June 17, 2005	Mount Lemmon	Mount Lemmon Survey	·	2.7 km	MPC · JPL
389712	2011 RF_{17}	—	December 31, 2007	Mount Lemmon	Mount Lemmon Survey	VER	2.5 km	MPC · JPL
389713	2011 SW_{1}	—	January 25, 2009	Kitt Peak	Spacewatch	·	2.8 km	MPC · JPL
389714	2011 SH_{2}	—	August 19, 2006	Kitt Peak	Spacewatch	KOR	1.3 km	MPC · JPL
389715	2011 SH_{10}	—	December 22, 2008	Kitt Peak	Spacewatch	·	1.4 km	MPC · JPL
389716	2011 SU_{29}	—	September 24, 2000	Socorro	LINEAR	TIR	3.3 km	MPC · JPL
389717	2011 SH_{30}	—	October 1, 2003	Kitt Peak	Spacewatch	3:2	5.6 km	MPC · JPL
389718	2011 SD_{33}	—	October 19, 2007	Catalina	CSS	EUN	1.5 km	MPC · JPL
389719	2011 SP_{46}	—	January 25, 2009	Kitt Peak	Spacewatch	·	1.7 km	MPC · JPL
389720	2011 ST_{47}	—	September 17, 2006	Kitt Peak	Spacewatch	·	2.1 km	MPC · JPL
389721	2011 SU_{47}	—	June 6, 2005	Kitt Peak	Spacewatch	KOR	1.5 km	MPC · JPL
389722	2011 SA_{52}	—	September 13, 2005	Catalina	CSS	·	4.9 km	MPC · JPL
389723	2011 SB_{53}	—	September 13, 2005	Kitt Peak	Spacewatch	·	3.0 km	MPC · JPL
389724	2011 SG_{56}	—	September 30, 2005	Kitt Peak	Spacewatch	·	3.5 km	MPC · JPL
389725	2011 SJ_{58}	—	November 7, 2007	Kitt Peak	Spacewatch	MRX	1.2 km	MPC · JPL
389726	2011 SD_{62}	—	April 7, 2000	Kitt Peak	Spacewatch	·	2.7 km	MPC · JPL
389727	2011 SY_{81}	—	January 30, 2009	Mount Lemmon	Mount Lemmon Survey	·	1.6 km	MPC · JPL
389728	2011 SX_{83}	—	December 10, 2004	Campo Imperatore	CINEOS	3:2	5.6 km	MPC · JPL
389729	2011 SN_{90}	—	March 26, 2003	Kitt Peak	Spacewatch	·	5.0 km	MPC · JPL
389730	2011 SF_{93}	—	October 17, 2003	Kitt Peak	Spacewatch	BRG	1.8 km	MPC · JPL
389731	2011 SL_{93}	—	April 25, 2003	Kitt Peak	Spacewatch	·	4.2 km	MPC · JPL
389732	2011 SP_{102}	—	October 9, 2007	Kitt Peak	Spacewatch	·	1.6 km	MPC · JPL
389733	2011 SR_{108}	—	March 11, 2005	Kitt Peak	Spacewatch	AGN	1.3 km	MPC · JPL
389734	2011 SC_{109}	—	March 3, 2009	Mount Lemmon	Mount Lemmon Survey	EOS	1.9 km	MPC · JPL
389735	2011 SU_{109}	—	November 10, 2006	Kitt Peak	Spacewatch	THM	2.6 km	MPC · JPL
389736	2011 SG_{110}	—	August 27, 1995	Kitt Peak	Spacewatch	·	4.0 km	MPC · JPL
389737	2011 SK_{110}	—	October 3, 2003	Kitt Peak	Spacewatch	·	2.0 km	MPC · JPL
389738	2011 SB_{111}	—	September 16, 2006	Catalina	CSS	EOS	2.3 km	MPC · JPL
389739	2011 SD_{114}	—	September 30, 2006	Mount Lemmon	Mount Lemmon Survey	·	2.8 km	MPC · JPL
389740	2011 ST_{117}	—	February 2, 2009	Kitt Peak	Spacewatch	·	2.3 km	MPC · JPL
389741	2011 SF_{120}	—	December 4, 2007	Kitt Peak	Spacewatch	KOR	1.6 km	MPC · JPL
389742	2011 SY_{124}	—	October 8, 2007	Kitt Peak	Spacewatch	·	3.0 km	MPC · JPL
389743	2011 SE_{126}	—	February 2, 2005	Kitt Peak	Spacewatch	MAS	810 m	MPC · JPL
389744	2011 SV_{132}	—	September 30, 2006	Mount Lemmon	Mount Lemmon Survey	·	1.8 km	MPC · JPL
389745	2011 SX_{134}	—	May 10, 2006	Mount Lemmon	Mount Lemmon Survey	·	1.8 km	MPC · JPL
389746	2011 SL_{137}	—	September 17, 2006	Kitt Peak	Spacewatch	·	2.8 km	MPC · JPL
389747	2011 SS_{143}	—	September 28, 2003	Kitt Peak	Spacewatch	·	1.3 km	MPC · JPL
389748	2011 SP_{144}	—	October 2, 2006	Mount Lemmon	Mount Lemmon Survey	(31811)	3.5 km	MPC · JPL
389749	2011 SW_{154}	—	September 27, 2000	Kitt Peak	Spacewatch	·	3.3 km	MPC · JPL
389750	2011 SY_{154}	—	February 22, 2009	Kitt Peak	Spacewatch	fast	2.0 km	MPC · JPL
389751	2011 SW_{162}	—	February 27, 2009	Kitt Peak	Spacewatch	·	2.2 km	MPC · JPL
389752	2011 SA_{163}	—	January 18, 2008	Kitt Peak	Spacewatch	EOS	1.7 km	MPC · JPL
389753	2011 SM_{164}	—	April 23, 2010	WISE	WISE	·	3.4 km	MPC · JPL
389754	2011 SR_{174}	—	January 31, 2006	Kitt Peak	Spacewatch	·	2.9 km	MPC · JPL
389755	2011 SO_{178}	—	August 31, 2005	Kitt Peak	Spacewatch	·	2.9 km	MPC · JPL
389756	2011 SW_{180}	—	March 21, 2009	Kitt Peak	Spacewatch	·	3.7 km	MPC · JPL
389757	2011 SM_{186}	—	March 26, 2003	Kitt Peak	Spacewatch	·	4.4 km	MPC · JPL
389758	2011 SS_{193}	—	April 25, 2000	Kitt Peak	Spacewatch	·	2.2 km	MPC · JPL
389759	2011 SH_{198}	—	February 16, 2004	Kitt Peak	Spacewatch	(16286)	2.4 km	MPC · JPL
389760	2011 SS_{198}	—	September 17, 2006	Kitt Peak	Spacewatch	·	1.8 km	MPC · JPL
389761	2011 SG_{199}	—	January 9, 2005	Catalina	CSS	·	2.1 km	MPC · JPL
389762	2011 SY_{202}	—	February 18, 2010	WISE	WISE	·	3.5 km	MPC · JPL
389763	2011 SD_{212}	—	November 11, 1996	Kitt Peak	Spacewatch	·	3.1 km	MPC · JPL
389764	2011 SV_{214}	—	October 1, 2000	Socorro	LINEAR	EOS	2.2 km	MPC · JPL
389765	2011 SN_{215}	—	September 8, 2011	Kitt Peak	Spacewatch	·	2.6 km	MPC · JPL
389766	2011 SX_{215}	—	March 3, 2005	Kitt Peak	Spacewatch	·	2.8 km	MPC · JPL
389767	2011 SW_{216}	—	February 20, 2009	Kitt Peak	Spacewatch	·	3.6 km	MPC · JPL
389768	2011 SX_{224}	—	March 18, 2001	Socorro	LINEAR	EUN	1.6 km	MPC · JPL
389769	2011 SA_{230}	—	July 11, 2004	Socorro	LINEAR	·	610 m	MPC · JPL
389770	2011 SN_{241}	—	January 16, 2008	Mount Lemmon	Mount Lemmon Survey	·	2.6 km	MPC · JPL
389771	2011 SY_{255}	—	March 21, 1998	Kitt Peak	Spacewatch	·	2.9 km	MPC · JPL
389772	2011 SP_{256}	—	April 6, 2005	Kitt Peak	Spacewatch	GEF	1.2 km	MPC · JPL
389773	2011 SN_{258}	—	September 19, 2000	Kitt Peak	Spacewatch	·	2.4 km	MPC · JPL
389774	2011 SU_{259}	—	February 10, 2008	Kitt Peak	Spacewatch	HYG	2.8 km	MPC · JPL
389775	2011 SH_{264}	—	September 12, 1994	Kitt Peak	Spacewatch	·	3.6 km	MPC · JPL
389776	2011 SP_{269}	—	September 20, 1995	Kitt Peak	Spacewatch	·	2.0 km	MPC · JPL
389777	2011 SQ_{274}	—	May 27, 2004	Kitt Peak	Spacewatch	·	3.7 km	MPC · JPL
389778	2011 TW_{11}	—	April 9, 2003	Kitt Peak	Spacewatch	·	3.5 km	MPC · JPL
389779	2011 TF_{13}	—	March 24, 2003	Kitt Peak	Spacewatch	·	3.5 km	MPC · JPL
389780	2011 TP_{13}	—	November 18, 2006	Kitt Peak	Spacewatch	·	2.8 km	MPC · JPL
389781	2011 UU_{12}	—	February 9, 2008	Mount Lemmon	Mount Lemmon Survey	·	3.2 km	MPC · JPL
389782	2011 UA_{18}	—	September 27, 2005	Kitt Peak	Spacewatch	·	3.8 km	MPC · JPL
389783	2011 UG_{24}	—	May 6, 2010	Mount Lemmon	Mount Lemmon Survey	V	640 m	MPC · JPL
389784	2011 UC_{29}	—	June 15, 2010	WISE	WISE	·	5.6 km	MPC · JPL
389785	2011 UV_{51}	—	September 26, 2005	Kitt Peak	Spacewatch	·	3.5 km	MPC · JPL
389786	2011 UW_{53}	—	August 31, 2005	Anderson Mesa	LONEOS	·	2.7 km	MPC · JPL
389787	2011 UL_{69}	—	March 17, 2005	Mount Lemmon	Mount Lemmon Survey	·	2.4 km	MPC · JPL
389788	2011 UN_{72}	—	September 25, 2005	Kitt Peak	Spacewatch	·	5.1 km	MPC · JPL
389789	2011 UC_{75}	—	April 23, 2009	Kitt Peak	Spacewatch	·	3.0 km	MPC · JPL
389790	2011 UY_{75}	—	October 17, 2006	Kitt Peak	Spacewatch	·	2.1 km	MPC · JPL
389791	2011 UQ_{79}	—	April 19, 2009	Mount Lemmon	Mount Lemmon Survey	·	4.1 km	MPC · JPL
389792	2011 UY_{79}	—	September 7, 2004	Kitt Peak	Spacewatch	SYL · CYB	4.1 km	MPC · JPL
389793	2011 UR_{92}	—	November 2, 2006	Mount Lemmon	Mount Lemmon Survey	·	1.8 km	MPC · JPL
389794	2011 UX_{100}	—	May 8, 2005	Mount Lemmon	Mount Lemmon Survey	AGN	1.5 km	MPC · JPL
389795	2011 UB_{117}	—	November 20, 2006	Kitt Peak	Spacewatch	VER	2.8 km	MPC · JPL
389796	2011 US_{119}	—	March 11, 2005	Kitt Peak	Spacewatch	·	3.0 km	MPC · JPL
389797	2011 UB_{134}	—	November 19, 2007	Mount Lemmon	Mount Lemmon Survey	·	4.8 km	MPC · JPL
389798	2011 UE_{141}	—	October 23, 2011	Mount Lemmon	Mount Lemmon Survey	·	2.2 km	MPC · JPL
389799	2011 UC_{144}	—	September 29, 2005	Kitt Peak	Spacewatch	HYG	3.3 km	MPC · JPL
389800	2011 UD_{152}	—	March 17, 2009	Kitt Peak	Spacewatch	EOS	2.1 km	MPC · JPL

== 389801–389900 ==
back to top

Designation			Discovery			Properties		Ref
Permanent	Provisional	Named after	Date	Site	Discoverer(s)	Category	Diam.	Ref
389801	2011 UH_{190}	—	November 20, 2006	Kitt Peak	Spacewatch	·	3.8 km	MPC · JPL
389802	2011 UW_{221}	—	May 15, 2010	WISE	WISE	LUT	5.9 km	MPC · JPL
389803	2011 UU_{285}	—	November 5, 2007	Kitt Peak	Spacewatch	·	1.8 km	MPC · JPL
389804	2011 UA_{298}	—	March 19, 2009	Kitt Peak	Spacewatch	EOS	2.1 km	MPC · JPL
389805	2011 UZ_{314}	—	April 11, 2010	Kitt Peak	Spacewatch	·	660 m	MPC · JPL
389806	2011 UE_{347}	—	August 27, 2005	Kitt Peak	Spacewatch	·	2.3 km	MPC · JPL
389807	2011 UD_{356}	—	September 27, 2006	Kitt Peak	Spacewatch	·	2.1 km	MPC · JPL
389808	2011 UT_{369}	—	March 31, 2005	Anderson Mesa	LONEOS	·	2.3 km	MPC · JPL
389809	2011 UL_{395}	—	March 19, 2009	Kitt Peak	Spacewatch	·	3.7 km	MPC · JPL
389810	2011 UD_{404}	—	October 31, 2011	Mount Lemmon	Mount Lemmon Survey	L4	10 km	MPC · JPL
389811	2011 UA_{405}	—	March 14, 2004	Kitt Peak	Spacewatch	KOR	1.8 km	MPC · JPL
389812	2011 UL_{406}	—	August 6, 2005	Siding Spring	SSS	·	3.6 km	MPC · JPL
389813	2011 VB_{20}	—	November 15, 2006	Kitt Peak	Spacewatch	·	2.5 km	MPC · JPL
389814	2011 VV_{22}	—	October 28, 2006	Kitt Peak	Spacewatch	EOS	2.6 km	MPC · JPL
389815	2011 VC_{23}	—	October 1, 2000	Socorro	LINEAR	·	1.5 km	MPC · JPL
389816	2011 WJ_{4}	—	April 28, 2009	Mount Lemmon	Mount Lemmon Survey	VER	3.5 km	MPC · JPL
389817	2011 WW_{37}	—	March 24, 2003	Kitt Peak	Spacewatch	·	4.2 km	MPC · JPL
389818	2011 WC_{47}	—	April 26, 2003	Kitt Peak	Spacewatch	·	3.5 km	MPC · JPL
389819	2011 WV_{47}	—	February 5, 2009	Kitt Peak	Spacewatch	(5)	2.0 km	MPC · JPL
389820	2011 WU_{92}	—	October 12, 2010	Mount Lemmon	Mount Lemmon Survey	T_{j} (2.99) · centaur	10 km	MPC · JPL
389821	2011 WX_{149}	—	August 30, 2005	Kitt Peak	Spacewatch	EOS	2.1 km	MPC · JPL
389822	2011 XW_{1}	—	October 17, 2010	Mount Lemmon	Mount Lemmon Survey	L4	7.5 km	MPC · JPL
389823	2011 YP_{24}	—	December 25, 2011	Kitt Peak	Spacewatch	L4 · ERY	9.5 km	MPC · JPL
389824	2011 YH_{75}	—	December 27, 2011	Mount Lemmon	Mount Lemmon Survey	L4 · ERY	9.2 km	MPC · JPL
389825	2012 AM_{1}	—	September 3, 2008	Kitt Peak	Spacewatch	L4	7.8 km	MPC · JPL
389826	2012 BU_{60}	—	January 19, 2001	Kitt Peak	Spacewatch	L4	10 km	MPC · JPL
389827	2012 BN_{96}	—	September 7, 2008	Mount Lemmon	Mount Lemmon Survey	L4	9.2 km	MPC · JPL
389828	2012 BY_{117}	—	April 11, 2005	Mount Lemmon	Mount Lemmon Survey	·	1.6 km	MPC · JPL
389829	2012 DC_{5}	—	March 4, 2005	Mount Lemmon	Mount Lemmon Survey	NYS	830 m	MPC · JPL
389830	2012 EY_{1}	—	January 28, 2003	Kitt Peak	Spacewatch	·	2.6 km	MPC · JPL
389831	2012 FN_{12}	—	March 10, 2007	Kitt Peak	Spacewatch	·	2.1 km	MPC · JPL
389832	2012 HG_{33}	—	February 4, 2000	Kitt Peak	Spacewatch	·	3.3 km	MPC · JPL
389833	2012 JW_{5}	—	December 29, 2005	Catalina	CSS	H	690 m	MPC · JPL
389834	2012 JG_{46}	—	December 7, 2005	Kitt Peak	Spacewatch	·	1.8 km	MPC · JPL
389835	2012 OG_{5}	—	October 21, 2009	Mount Lemmon	Mount Lemmon Survey	·	790 m	MPC · JPL
389836	2012 PQ_{4}	—	November 14, 2007	Socorro	LINEAR	H	700 m	MPC · JPL
389837	2012 PP_{23}	—	January 27, 2007	Kitt Peak	Spacewatch	V	670 m	MPC · JPL
389838	2012 PY_{26}	—	March 29, 2008	Kitt Peak	Spacewatch	·	620 m	MPC · JPL
389839	2012 PU_{37}	—	August 23, 2004	Kitt Peak	Spacewatch	H	550 m	MPC · JPL
389840	2012 QV_{19}	—	January 27, 2007	Kitt Peak	Spacewatch	·	810 m	MPC · JPL
389841	2012 QV_{25}	—	September 30, 2008	Catalina	CSS	·	1.3 km	MPC · JPL
389842	2012 QO_{30}	—	October 1, 2008	Mount Lemmon	Mount Lemmon Survey	·	2.1 km	MPC · JPL
389843	2012 QP_{30}	—	February 5, 2000	Kitt Peak	Spacewatch	WAT	2.0 km	MPC · JPL
389844	2012 QQ_{37}	—	February 17, 2001	Kitt Peak	Spacewatch	·	740 m	MPC · JPL
389845	2012 QX_{51}	—	September 23, 2008	Mount Lemmon	Mount Lemmon Survey	PHO	1.0 km	MPC · JPL
389846	2012 RS_{3}	—	December 7, 2005	Kitt Peak	Spacewatch	·	1.2 km	MPC · JPL
389847	2012 RF_{5}	—	December 17, 2009	Kitt Peak	Spacewatch	V	710 m	MPC · JPL
389848	2012 RJ_{5}	—	March 20, 2010	Mount Lemmon	Mount Lemmon Survey	·	2.2 km	MPC · JPL
389849	2012 RB_{7}	—	November 19, 2001	Socorro	LINEAR	·	1.4 km	MPC · JPL
389850	2012 RT_{15}	—	November 12, 2006	Mount Lemmon	Mount Lemmon Survey	·	980 m	MPC · JPL
389851	2012 RE_{18}	—	October 24, 1998	Kitt Peak	Spacewatch	·	1.8 km	MPC · JPL
389852	2012 RY_{19}	—	March 13, 2010	Mount Lemmon	Mount Lemmon Survey	·	1.6 km	MPC · JPL
389853	2012 RS_{24}	—	September 19, 2001	Socorro	LINEAR	V	710 m	MPC · JPL
389854	2012 RT_{24}	—	January 12, 2010	Catalina	CSS	·	1.8 km	MPC · JPL
389855	2012 RG_{26}	—	December 30, 2005	Mount Lemmon	Mount Lemmon Survey	NYS	1.2 km	MPC · JPL
389856	2012 RL_{28}	—	November 18, 2004	Siding Spring	SSS	·	1.2 km	MPC · JPL
389857	2012 RQ_{28}	—	September 13, 1998	Kitt Peak	Spacewatch	(18466)	2.4 km	MPC · JPL
389858	2012 RC_{29}	—	December 19, 2004	Mount Lemmon	Mount Lemmon Survey	·	1.6 km	MPC · JPL
389859	2012 RY_{33}	—	September 28, 2003	Kitt Peak	Spacewatch	·	1.8 km	MPC · JPL
389860	2012 RX_{34}	—	October 24, 2008	Kitt Peak	Spacewatch	·	1.4 km	MPC · JPL
389861	2012 RT_{39}	—	December 26, 2005	Kitt Peak	Spacewatch	·	1.4 km	MPC · JPL
389862	2012 RX_{39}	—	November 11, 2009	Kitt Peak	Spacewatch	·	780 m	MPC · JPL
389863	2012 RY_{40}	—	October 2, 1999	Kitt Peak	Spacewatch	·	2.1 km	MPC · JPL
389864	2012 RF_{41}	—	November 1, 2008	Catalina	CSS	·	2.2 km	MPC · JPL
389865	2012 RJ_{42}	—	November 23, 2009	Mount Lemmon	Mount Lemmon Survey	·	730 m	MPC · JPL
389866	2012 RZ_{42}	—	December 21, 2008	Catalina	CSS	·	1.7 km	MPC · JPL
389867	2012 SH_{3}	—	January 13, 2005	Catalina	CSS	·	2.0 km	MPC · JPL
389868	2012 ST_{3}	—	September 30, 2003	Kitt Peak	Spacewatch	·	1.9 km	MPC · JPL
389869	2012 SY_{9}	—	August 9, 2007	Kitt Peak	Spacewatch	·	2.3 km	MPC · JPL
389870	2012 SB_{10}	—	March 26, 2009	Mount Lemmon	Mount Lemmon Survey	H	420 m	MPC · JPL
389871	2012 SW_{10}	—	April 4, 1995	Kitt Peak	Spacewatch	·	790 m	MPC · JPL
389872	2012 SH_{11}	—	December 18, 2003	Kitt Peak	Spacewatch	·	710 m	MPC · JPL
389873	2012 SH_{12}	—	July 29, 2008	Kitt Peak	Spacewatch	·	1.2 km	MPC · JPL
389874	2012 SL_{18}	—	October 27, 2008	Kitt Peak	Spacewatch	RAF	1.0 km	MPC · JPL
389875	2012 SM_{18}	—	September 23, 2001	Socorro	LINEAR	·	3.2 km	MPC · JPL
389876	2012 SU_{18}	—	September 28, 1997	Kitt Peak	Spacewatch	·	1.4 km	MPC · JPL
389877	2012 SX_{25}	—	November 20, 2001	Socorro	LINEAR	·	1.2 km	MPC · JPL
389878	2012 SA_{42}	—	August 28, 2005	Kitt Peak	Spacewatch	·	750 m	MPC · JPL
389879	2012 SC_{44}	—	April 23, 1998	Kitt Peak	Spacewatch	·	780 m	MPC · JPL
389880	2012 SJ_{45}	—	October 3, 1999	Kitt Peak	Spacewatch	ADE	2.8 km	MPC · JPL
389881	2012 SR_{54}	—	October 29, 2003	Kitt Peak	Spacewatch	·	1.9 km	MPC · JPL
389882	2012 SY_{55}	—	October 27, 2008	Mount Lemmon	Mount Lemmon Survey	EUN	1.1 km	MPC · JPL
389883	2012 SL_{59}	—	March 3, 2009	Kitt Peak	Spacewatch	·	3.2 km	MPC · JPL
389884	2012 SA_{61}	—	October 28, 2008	Mount Lemmon	Mount Lemmon Survey	·	1.5 km	MPC · JPL
389885	2012 SD_{61}	—	September 26, 1998	Socorro	LINEAR	·	990 m	MPC · JPL
389886	2012 SS_{61}	—	August 23, 2001	Anderson Mesa	LONEOS	·	3.2 km	MPC · JPL
389887	2012 SX_{64}	—	October 2, 2003	Kitt Peak	Spacewatch	·	1.9 km	MPC · JPL
389888	2012 TG_{2}	—	October 23, 2009	Mount Lemmon	Mount Lemmon Survey	·	590 m	MPC · JPL
389889	2012 TL_{5}	—	March 25, 2007	Mount Lemmon	Mount Lemmon Survey	L5	10 km	MPC · JPL
389890	2012 TE_{7}	—	January 18, 2005	Catalina	CSS	·	2.1 km	MPC · JPL
389891	2012 TS_{8}	—	October 22, 1995	Kitt Peak	Spacewatch	·	720 m	MPC · JPL
389892	2012 TJ_{9}	—	March 10, 2005	Mount Lemmon	Mount Lemmon Survey	·	1.9 km	MPC · JPL
389893	2012 TL_{13}	—	May 2, 2006	Mount Lemmon	Mount Lemmon Survey	·	2.3 km	MPC · JPL
389894	2012 TZ_{13}	—	October 14, 2001	Socorro	LINEAR	·	1.0 km	MPC · JPL
389895	2012 TB_{14}	—	March 1, 2008	Kitt Peak	Spacewatch	·	780 m	MPC · JPL
389896	2012 TW_{17}	—	February 20, 2009	Kitt Peak	Spacewatch	·	2.8 km	MPC · JPL
389897	2012 TD_{23}	—	April 29, 2008	Kitt Peak	Spacewatch	·	770 m	MPC · JPL
389898	2012 TM_{27}	—	October 27, 2005	Kitt Peak	Spacewatch	V	600 m	MPC · JPL
389899	2012 TP_{27}	—	April 13, 2004	Kitt Peak	Spacewatch	·	810 m	MPC · JPL
389900	2012 TX_{27}	—	April 13, 2001	Kitt Peak	Spacewatch	·	2.0 km	MPC · JPL

== 389901–390000 ==
back to top

Designation			Discovery			Properties		Ref
Permanent	Provisional	Named after	Date	Site	Discoverer(s)	Category	Diam.	Ref
389901	2012 TP_{32}	—	November 9, 2007	Mount Lemmon	Mount Lemmon Survey	·	2.2 km	MPC · JPL
389902	2012 TA_{37}	—	November 2, 2007	Mount Lemmon	Mount Lemmon Survey	VER	2.7 km	MPC · JPL
389903	2012 TE_{38}	—	August 7, 2008	Kitt Peak	Spacewatch	·	1.3 km	MPC · JPL
389904	2012 TH_{40}	—	November 14, 2006	Mount Lemmon	Mount Lemmon Survey	·	800 m	MPC · JPL
389905	2012 TC_{42}	—	December 22, 2008	Mount Lemmon	Mount Lemmon Survey	·	2.6 km	MPC · JPL
389906	2012 TL_{54}	—	December 13, 2004	Kitt Peak	Spacewatch	·	1.8 km	MPC · JPL
389907	2012 TY_{54}	—	October 21, 2008	Kitt Peak	Spacewatch	·	1.4 km	MPC · JPL
389908	2012 TO_{56}	—	August 27, 2006	Kitt Peak	Spacewatch	·	3.0 km	MPC · JPL
389909	2012 TZ_{56}	—	March 8, 2009	Mount Lemmon	Mount Lemmon Survey	·	4.2 km	MPC · JPL
389910	2012 TP_{57}	—	November 25, 2005	Mount Lemmon	Mount Lemmon Survey	·	1.1 km	MPC · JPL
389911	2012 TP_{58}	—	March 10, 2011	Kitt Peak	Spacewatch	·	780 m	MPC · JPL
389912	2012 TY_{65}	—	October 6, 1999	Socorro	LINEAR	·	1.5 km	MPC · JPL
389913	2012 TX_{69}	—	July 31, 2008	Mount Lemmon	Mount Lemmon Survey	·	1.4 km	MPC · JPL
389914	2012 TH_{74}	—	November 20, 2001	Socorro	LINEAR	·	1.3 km	MPC · JPL
389915	2012 TG_{87}	—	March 23, 2003	Kitt Peak	Spacewatch	V	820 m	MPC · JPL
389916	2012 TC_{88}	—	October 23, 2003	Kitt Peak	Spacewatch	AGN	1.2 km	MPC · JPL
389917	2012 TH_{91}	—	November 21, 2009	Mount Lemmon	Mount Lemmon Survey	MAS	810 m	MPC · JPL
389918	2012 TG_{93}	—	January 23, 2006	Kitt Peak	Spacewatch	·	1.4 km	MPC · JPL
389919	2012 TO_{97}	—	September 18, 2003	Kitt Peak	Spacewatch	·	1.8 km	MPC · JPL
389920	2012 TT_{99}	—	October 7, 1996	Kitt Peak	Spacewatch	·	2.6 km	MPC · JPL
389921	2012 TN_{102}	—	December 26, 2005	Kitt Peak	Spacewatch	NYS	1.1 km	MPC · JPL
389922	2012 TO_{102}	—	April 5, 2010	Kitt Peak	Spacewatch	·	1.6 km	MPC · JPL
389923	2012 TX_{104}	—	August 21, 2006	Kitt Peak	Spacewatch	HYG	2.3 km	MPC · JPL
389924	2012 TT_{109}	—	January 31, 2009	Kitt Peak	Spacewatch	EOS	1.9 km	MPC · JPL
389925	2012 TU_{118}	—	March 20, 2007	Catalina	CSS	·	1.3 km	MPC · JPL
389926	2012 TJ_{125}	—	January 1, 2009	Kitt Peak	Spacewatch	·	1.9 km	MPC · JPL
389927	2012 TD_{126}	—	December 11, 2004	Catalina	CSS	EUN	1.7 km	MPC · JPL
389928	2012 TH_{129}	—	December 18, 1999	Kitt Peak	Spacewatch	·	770 m	MPC · JPL
389929	2012 TM_{129}	—	October 21, 2008	Kitt Peak	Spacewatch	(5)	1.2 km	MPC · JPL
389930	2012 TS_{130}	—	October 27, 2008	Mount Lemmon	Mount Lemmon Survey	·	1.6 km	MPC · JPL
389931	2012 TB_{131}	—	December 14, 2001	Socorro	LINEAR	NYS	1.5 km	MPC · JPL
389932	2012 TO_{131}	—	October 1, 1998	Kitt Peak	Spacewatch	·	2.4 km	MPC · JPL
389933	2012 TR_{131}	—	October 8, 2012	Kitt Peak	Spacewatch	·	4.1 km	MPC · JPL
389934	2012 TA_{133}	—	September 21, 2003	Kitt Peak	Spacewatch	·	1.9 km	MPC · JPL
389935	2012 TX_{133}	—	March 12, 2010	Catalina	CSS	·	1.7 km	MPC · JPL
389936	2012 TT_{134}	—	November 18, 2008	Kitt Peak	Spacewatch	·	1.5 km	MPC · JPL
389937	2012 TG_{136}	—	October 23, 1995	Kitt Peak	Spacewatch	·	1.1 km	MPC · JPL
389938	2012 TC_{138}	—	September 30, 1999	Kitt Peak	Spacewatch	·	1.2 km	MPC · JPL
389939	2012 TB_{145}	—	April 25, 2004	Kitt Peak	Spacewatch	·	940 m	MPC · JPL
389940	2012 TP_{149}	—	December 28, 2005	Kitt Peak	Spacewatch	·	1.1 km	MPC · JPL
389941	2012 TJ_{150}	—	September 16, 2006	Kitt Peak	Spacewatch	·	2.3 km	MPC · JPL
389942	2012 TF_{151}	—	December 17, 2003	Kitt Peak	Spacewatch	·	2.0 km	MPC · JPL
389943	2012 TC_{154}	—	October 29, 2008	Mount Lemmon	Mount Lemmon Survey	·	1.3 km	MPC · JPL
389944	2012 TV_{157}	—	May 23, 2006	Kitt Peak	Spacewatch	·	2.1 km	MPC · JPL
389945	2012 TR_{161}	—	September 7, 2008	Mount Lemmon	Mount Lemmon Survey	·	1.2 km	MPC · JPL
389946	2012 TM_{163}	—	March 23, 2006	Kitt Peak	Spacewatch	KON	2.3 km	MPC · JPL
389947	2012 TY_{163}	—	October 22, 2008	Kitt Peak	Spacewatch	·	1.5 km	MPC · JPL
389948	2012 TQ_{166}	—	September 28, 2003	Kitt Peak	Spacewatch	(12739)	1.7 km	MPC · JPL
389949	2012 TA_{167}	—	October 2, 1997	Caussols	ODAS	·	2.6 km	MPC · JPL
389950	2012 TH_{168}	—	April 8, 2010	Kitt Peak	Spacewatch	·	1.5 km	MPC · JPL
389951	2012 TM_{168}	—	December 31, 2008	Mount Lemmon	Mount Lemmon Survey	·	2.7 km	MPC · JPL
389952	2012 TV_{168}	—	September 21, 2001	Socorro	LINEAR	V	730 m	MPC · JPL
389953	2012 TX_{168}	—	January 26, 2007	Kitt Peak	Spacewatch	·	760 m	MPC · JPL
389954	2012 TW_{169}	—	November 24, 2008	Mount Lemmon	Mount Lemmon Survey	·	2.1 km	MPC · JPL
389955	2012 TR_{178}	—	October 19, 2003	Kitt Peak	Spacewatch	·	1.9 km	MPC · JPL
389956	2012 TD_{187}	—	October 1, 2005	Kitt Peak	Spacewatch	·	900 m	MPC · JPL
389957	2012 TN_{188}	—	October 25, 2008	Catalina	CSS	·	1.7 km	MPC · JPL
389958	2012 TD_{189}	—	November 21, 2005	Kitt Peak	Spacewatch	·	1.2 km	MPC · JPL
389959	2012 TV_{189}	—	December 5, 2007	Kitt Peak	Spacewatch	·	2.4 km	MPC · JPL
389960	2012 TS_{190}	—	March 28, 2011	Kitt Peak	Spacewatch	·	750 m	MPC · JPL
389961	2012 TU_{190}	—	April 5, 2003	Kitt Peak	Spacewatch	V	650 m	MPC · JPL
389962	2012 TS_{196}	—	October 3, 1999	Socorro	LINEAR	EUN	1.4 km	MPC · JPL
389963	2012 TP_{199}	—	October 12, 2007	Mount Lemmon	Mount Lemmon Survey	·	4.0 km	MPC · JPL
389964	2012 TG_{200}	—	February 28, 2009	Kitt Peak	Spacewatch	·	2.2 km	MPC · JPL
389965	2012 TN_{200}	—	October 1, 2003	Kitt Peak	Spacewatch	·	1.9 km	MPC · JPL
389966	2012 TZ_{200}	—	December 28, 2005	Catalina	CSS	fast	1.6 km	MPC · JPL
389967	2012 TQ_{213}	—	September 11, 2004	Kitt Peak	Spacewatch	·	1.5 km	MPC · JPL
389968	2012 TY_{213}	—	September 7, 2008	Mount Lemmon	Mount Lemmon Survey	V	700 m	MPC · JPL
389969	2012 TJ_{214}	—	March 24, 2006	Mount Lemmon	Mount Lemmon Survey	·	1.9 km	MPC · JPL
389970	2012 TU_{218}	—	November 19, 2007	Kitt Peak	Spacewatch	·	3.5 km	MPC · JPL
389971	2012 TF_{223}	—	August 29, 2006	Kitt Peak	Spacewatch	·	3.4 km	MPC · JPL
389972	2012 TF_{224}	—	March 26, 2008	Mount Lemmon	Mount Lemmon Survey	·	710 m	MPC · JPL
389973	2012 TN_{224}	—	September 6, 2008	Mount Lemmon	Mount Lemmon Survey	·	1.1 km	MPC · JPL
389974	2012 TO_{227}	—	September 7, 2008	Mount Lemmon	Mount Lemmon Survey	·	1.2 km	MPC · JPL
389975	2012 TW_{234}	—	December 5, 2002	Kitt Peak	Spacewatch	·	890 m	MPC · JPL
389976	2012 TP_{235}	—	May 8, 2005	Mount Lemmon	Mount Lemmon Survey	·	2.1 km	MPC · JPL
389977	2012 TP_{237}	—	September 27, 2008	Mount Lemmon	Mount Lemmon Survey	·	1.4 km	MPC · JPL
389978	2012 TD_{238}	—	February 9, 2007	Kitt Peak	Spacewatch	·	700 m	MPC · JPL
389979	2012 TL_{252}	—	December 2, 2005	Kitt Peak	Spacewatch	·	1.5 km	MPC · JPL
389980	2012 TQ_{254}	—	September 17, 2006	Kitt Peak	Spacewatch	EOS	2.0 km	MPC · JPL
389981	2012 TB_{255}	—	September 20, 2003	Campo Imperatore	CINEOS	EUN	1.3 km	MPC · JPL
389982	2012 TL_{255}	—	September 26, 2006	Catalina	CSS	·	3.9 km	MPC · JPL
389983	2012 TF_{256}	—	October 2, 2003	Kitt Peak	Spacewatch	·	1.8 km	MPC · JPL
389984	2012 TM_{267}	—	November 24, 2003	Kitt Peak	Spacewatch	HOF	2.5 km	MPC · JPL
389985	2012 TF_{270}	—	March 11, 2011	Kitt Peak	Spacewatch	·	610 m	MPC · JPL
389986	2012 TT_{281}	—	December 12, 2004	Kitt Peak	Spacewatch	·	1.7 km	MPC · JPL
389987	2012 TB_{287}	—	November 2, 2005	Mount Lemmon	Mount Lemmon Survey	·	1.0 km	MPC · JPL
389988	2012 TV_{289}	—	October 6, 1999	Socorro	LINEAR	·	1.6 km	MPC · JPL
389989	2012 TZ_{289}	—	April 6, 2005	Mount Lemmon	Mount Lemmon Survey	·	2.1 km	MPC · JPL
389990	2012 TF_{290}	—	October 1, 1999	Catalina	CSS	·	990 m	MPC · JPL
389991	2012 TP_{290}	—	November 7, 2007	Kitt Peak	Spacewatch	·	3.1 km	MPC · JPL
389992	2012 TA_{291}	—	February 27, 2006	Kitt Peak	Spacewatch	·	1.1 km	MPC · JPL
389993	2012 TP_{291}	—	April 21, 2009	Mount Lemmon	Mount Lemmon Survey	·	2.2 km	MPC · JPL
389994	2012 TC_{295}	—	September 21, 2003	Kitt Peak	Spacewatch	·	1.5 km	MPC · JPL
389995	2012 TF_{296}	—	January 24, 1996	Kitt Peak	Spacewatch	WIT	1.1 km	MPC · JPL
389996	2012 TO_{296}	—	March 21, 2001	Kitt Peak	Spacewatch	·	830 m	MPC · JPL
389997	2012 TT_{296}	—	August 24, 2007	Kitt Peak	Spacewatch	·	1.7 km	MPC · JPL
389998	2012 TV_{297}	—	April 19, 2006	Mount Lemmon	Mount Lemmon Survey	·	1.4 km	MPC · JPL
389999	2012 TP_{299}	—	September 19, 2001	Socorro	LINEAR	V	620 m	MPC · JPL
390000	2012 TB_{300}	—	September 13, 2007	Mount Lemmon	Mount Lemmon Survey	·	1.5 km	MPC · JPL

back to top

== See also ==
- Meanings of minor-planet names: 389001–390000
