= Meanings of minor-planet names: 389001–390000 =

As minor planet discoveries are confirmed, they are given a permanent number by the IAU's Minor Planet Center (MPC), and the discoverers can then submit names for them, following the IAU's naming conventions. The list below concerns those minor planets in the specified number-range that have received names, and explains the meanings of those names.

Official naming citations of newly named small Solar System bodies are approved and published in a bulletin by IAU's Working Group for Small Bodies Nomenclature (WGSBN). Before May 2021, citations were published in MPC's Minor Planet Circulars for many decades. Recent citations can also be found on the JPL Small-Body Database (SBDB). Until his death in 2016, German astronomer Lutz D. Schmadel compiled these citations into the Dictionary of Minor Planet Names (DMP) and regularly updated the collection.

Based on Paul Herget's The Names of the Minor Planets, Schmadel also researched the unclear origin of numerous asteroids, most of which had been named prior to World War II. This article incorporates text from this source, which is in the public domain: SBDB New namings may only be added to this list below after official publication as the preannouncement of names is condemned. The WGSBN publishes a comprehensive guideline for the naming rules of non-cometary small Solar System bodies.

== 389001–389100 ==
Named minor planet	Provisional	This minor planet was named for...	Ref · Catalog
There are no named minor planets in this number range

== 389101–389200 ==
back to top

Named minor planet	Provisional	This minor planet was named for...	Ref · Catalog
There are no named minor planets in this number range

== 389201–389300 ==
back to top

Named minor planet	Provisional	This minor planet was named for...	Ref · Catalog
389293 Hasubick	2009 KH_{2}	Werner Hasubick (born 1960) is a German amateur astronomer and an enthusiastic observer of comets. Hasubick started his astronomical work at the Buchloe Observatory in 1977 with the observation	JPL · 389293

== 389301–389400 ==
back to top

Named minor planet	Provisional	This minor planet was named for...	Ref · Catalog
There are no named minor planets in this number range

== 389401–389500 ==
back to top

Named minor planet	Provisional	This minor planet was named for...	Ref · Catalog
389470 Jan	2010 ER_{45}	Jan Bosch-Pellicer (born 2010) is the second grandson of the discoverer.	IAU · 389470
389478 Rivera-Valentín	2010 ER_{87}	Edgar G. Rivera-Valentín (born 1986) is a scientist at the Lunar and Planetary Institute. His research focuses on the interactions of processes, such as atmosphere-regolith interactions, impact cratering's interactions with a body's composition, and interactions between radar and the near-surface of asteroids and planetary surfaces.	JPL · 389478

== 389501–389600 ==
back to top

Named minor planet	Provisional	This minor planet was named for...	Ref · Catalog
There are no named minor planets in this number range

== 389601–389700 ==
back to top

Named minor planet	Provisional	This minor planet was named for...	Ref · Catalog
There are no named minor planets in this number range

== 389701–389800 ==
back to top

Named minor planet	Provisional	This minor planet was named for...	Ref · Catalog
There are no named minor planets in this number range

== 389801–389900 ==
back to top

Named minor planet	Provisional	This minor planet was named for...	Ref · Catalog
There are no named minor planets in this number range

== 389901–390000 ==
back to top

Named minor planet	Provisional	This minor planet was named for...	Ref · Catalog
There are no named minor planets in this number range

back to top

Preceded by 388,001–389,000	Meanings of minor-planet names List of minor planets: 389,001–390,000	Succeeded by 390,001–391,000
