= List of minor planets: 352001–353000 =

The following is a partial list of minor planets, running from minor-planet number 352001 through 353000, inclusive. The primary data for this and other partial lists is based on JPL's "Small-Body Orbital Elements" and data available from the Minor Planet Center. Critical list information is also provided by the MPC, unless otherwise specified from Lowell Observatory. A detailed description of the table's columns and additional sources are given on the main page including a complete list of every page in this series, and a statistical break-up on the dynamical classification of minor planets.

Also see the summary list of all named bodies in numerical and alphabetical order, and the corresponding naming citations for the number range of this particular list. New namings may only be added to this list after official publication, as the preannouncement of names is condemned by the Working Group for Small Bodies Nomenclature of the International Astronomical Union.

| Near-Earth obj. | MBA (inner) | MBA (outer) | Centaur |
| Mars-crosser | MBA (middle) | Jupiter trojan | Trans-Neptunian obj. |
| Unclassified |

== 352001–352100 ==
| Designation | | | Discovery | | | Properties | | Ref |
| Permanent | Provisional | Named after | Date | Site | Discoverer(s) | Category | Diam. | Ref |
|---|---|---|---|---|---|---|---|---|
| 352001 | 2006 UG_{221} | — | October 17, 2006 | Catalina | CSS | · | 1.9 km | MPC · JPL |
| 352002 | 2006 UH_{227} | — | October 20, 2006 | Palomar | NEAT | HYG | 3.0 km | MPC · JPL |
| 352003 | 2006 UA_{253} | — | October 27, 2006 | Mount Lemmon | Mount Lemmon Survey | · | 1.5 km | MPC · JPL |
| 352004 | 2006 UG_{253} | — | October 27, 2006 | Mount Lemmon | Mount Lemmon Survey | · | 1.9 km | MPC · JPL |
| 352005 | 2006 UE_{274} | — | October 27, 2006 | Kitt Peak | Spacewatch | · | 2.1 km | MPC · JPL |
| 352006 | 2006 UK_{287} | — | October 29, 2006 | Kitt Peak | Spacewatch | · | 1.8 km | MPC · JPL |
| 352007 | 2006 UZ_{289} | — | October 2, 2006 | Mount Lemmon | Mount Lemmon Survey | · | 3.0 km | MPC · JPL |
| 352008 | 2006 UK_{329} | — | October 23, 2006 | Catalina | CSS | URS | 4.6 km | MPC · JPL |
| 352009 | 2006 UN_{332} | — | October 21, 2006 | Apache Point | A. C. Becker | · | 2.3 km | MPC · JPL |
| 352010 | 2006 UR_{334} | — | October 20, 2006 | Kitt Peak | Spacewatch | THM | 1.8 km | MPC · JPL |
| 352011 | 2006 UG_{335} | — | October 16, 2006 | Kitt Peak | Spacewatch | HYG | 2.3 km | MPC · JPL |
| 352012 | 2006 UM_{346} | — | October 22, 2006 | Kitt Peak | Spacewatch | · | 2.4 km | MPC · JPL |
| 352013 | 2006 UT_{360} | — | October 27, 2006 | Catalina | CSS | EOS | 2.4 km | MPC · JPL |
| 352014 | 2006 VC_{5} | — | November 10, 2006 | Kitt Peak | Spacewatch | · | 2.4 km | MPC · JPL |
| 352015 | 2006 VP_{7} | — | November 10, 2006 | Kitt Peak | Spacewatch | · | 2.9 km | MPC · JPL |
| 352016 | 2006 VB_{8} | — | November 10, 2006 | Kitt Peak | Spacewatch | · | 3.9 km | MPC · JPL |
| 352017 Juvarra | 2006 VR_{13} | Juvarra | November 12, 2006 | Vallemare Borbona | V. S. Casulli | · | 2.6 km | MPC · JPL |
| 352018 | 2006 VW_{15} | — | November 9, 2006 | Kitt Peak | Spacewatch | · | 2.6 km | MPC · JPL |
| 352019 | 2006 VA_{17} | — | November 9, 2006 | Kitt Peak | Spacewatch | · | 3.2 km | MPC · JPL |
| 352020 | 2006 VS_{17} | — | November 9, 2006 | Kitt Peak | Spacewatch | EOS | 2.0 km | MPC · JPL |
| 352021 | 2006 VC_{22} | — | November 10, 2006 | Kitt Peak | Spacewatch | · | 2.4 km | MPC · JPL |
| 352022 | 2006 VP_{24} | — | November 10, 2006 | Kitt Peak | Spacewatch | · | 3.9 km | MPC · JPL |
| 352023 | 2006 VP_{27} | — | September 27, 2006 | Mount Lemmon | Mount Lemmon Survey | THM | 1.8 km | MPC · JPL |
| 352024 | 2006 VB_{30} | — | November 10, 2006 | Kitt Peak | Spacewatch | (7605) | 3.8 km | MPC · JPL |
| 352025 | 2006 VJ_{36} | — | November 11, 2006 | Catalina | CSS | · | 3.3 km | MPC · JPL |
| 352026 | 2006 VM_{45} | — | October 12, 2006 | Kitt Peak | Spacewatch | · | 3.3 km | MPC · JPL |
| 352027 | 2006 VS_{54} | — | November 11, 2006 | Kitt Peak | Spacewatch | · | 2.0 km | MPC · JPL |
| 352028 | 2006 VE_{56} | — | November 11, 2006 | Kitt Peak | Spacewatch | THM | 1.9 km | MPC · JPL |
| 352029 | 2006 VR_{58} | — | November 11, 2006 | Kitt Peak | Spacewatch | EOS | 1.9 km | MPC · JPL |
| 352030 | 2006 VR_{59} | — | October 22, 2006 | Mount Lemmon | Mount Lemmon Survey | · | 3.7 km | MPC · JPL |
| 352031 | 2006 VX_{67} | — | November 11, 2006 | Kitt Peak | Spacewatch | · | 4.4 km | MPC · JPL |
| 352032 | 2006 VA_{68} | — | September 28, 2006 | Mount Lemmon | Mount Lemmon Survey | · | 2.6 km | MPC · JPL |
| 352033 | 2006 VK_{73} | — | November 11, 2006 | Kitt Peak | Spacewatch | · | 3.6 km | MPC · JPL |
| 352034 | 2006 VN_{73} | — | November 11, 2006 | Mount Lemmon | Mount Lemmon Survey | · | 4.3 km | MPC · JPL |
| 352035 | 2006 VV_{80} | — | November 12, 2006 | Mount Lemmon | Mount Lemmon Survey | · | 3.6 km | MPC · JPL |
| 352036 | 2006 VT_{83} | — | November 13, 2006 | Kitt Peak | Spacewatch | · | 3.1 km | MPC · JPL |
| 352037 | 2006 VU_{84} | — | November 13, 2006 | Mount Lemmon | Mount Lemmon Survey | EOS | 2.0 km | MPC · JPL |
| 352038 | 2006 VK_{86} | — | November 14, 2006 | Socorro | LINEAR | · | 3.3 km | MPC · JPL |
| 352039 | 2006 VH_{87} | — | November 14, 2006 | Catalina | CSS | · | 3.1 km | MPC · JPL |
| 352040 | 2006 VY_{89} | — | November 14, 2006 | Kitt Peak | Spacewatch | · | 2.9 km | MPC · JPL |
| 352041 | 2006 VU_{97} | — | October 23, 2006 | Kitt Peak | Spacewatch | · | 2.1 km | MPC · JPL |
| 352042 | 2006 VV_{104} | — | October 31, 2006 | Kitt Peak | Spacewatch | · | 3.5 km | MPC · JPL |
| 352043 | 2006 VT_{107} | — | November 13, 2006 | Kitt Peak | Spacewatch | · | 3.0 km | MPC · JPL |
| 352044 | 2006 VX_{107} | — | November 13, 2006 | Kitt Peak | Spacewatch | · | 2.6 km | MPC · JPL |
| 352045 | 2006 VD_{109} | — | November 13, 2006 | Kitt Peak | Spacewatch | LIX | 3.3 km | MPC · JPL |
| 352046 | 2006 VA_{112} | — | November 13, 2006 | Palomar | NEAT | · | 5.4 km | MPC · JPL |
| 352047 | 2006 VO_{129} | — | November 15, 2006 | Socorro | LINEAR | · | 4.0 km | MPC · JPL |
| 352048 | 2006 VR_{142} | — | November 14, 2006 | Socorro | LINEAR | · | 2.4 km | MPC · JPL |
| 352049 | 2006 VX_{145} | — | September 18, 2006 | Catalina | CSS | · | 2.7 km | MPC · JPL |
| 352050 | 2006 VH_{146} | — | November 15, 2006 | Catalina | CSS | EOS | 2.3 km | MPC · JPL |
| 352051 | 2006 VN_{152} | — | November 9, 2006 | Palomar | NEAT | · | 4.0 km | MPC · JPL |
| 352052 | 2006 VB_{154} | — | October 4, 2006 | Mount Lemmon | Mount Lemmon Survey | · | 4.8 km | MPC · JPL |
| 352053 | 2006 VO_{155} | — | October 19, 2006 | Catalina | CSS | EOS | 2.8 km | MPC · JPL |
| 352054 | 2006 VT_{155} | — | November 15, 2006 | Catalina | CSS | · | 2.7 km | MPC · JPL |
| 352055 | 2006 VR_{173} | — | November 14, 2006 | Kitt Peak | Spacewatch | EOS | 2.1 km | MPC · JPL |
| 352056 | 2006 VX_{173} | — | November 2, 2006 | Mount Lemmon | Mount Lemmon Survey | · | 3.2 km | MPC · JPL |
| 352057 | 2006 WW_{33} | — | November 16, 2006 | Kitt Peak | Spacewatch | · | 2.4 km | MPC · JPL |
| 352058 | 2006 WG_{36} | — | November 16, 2006 | Kitt Peak | Spacewatch | HYG | 2.4 km | MPC · JPL |
| 352059 | 2006 WW_{36} | — | November 16, 2006 | Kitt Peak | Spacewatch | · | 4.0 km | MPC · JPL |
| 352060 | 2006 WF_{50} | — | November 16, 2006 | Mount Lemmon | Mount Lemmon Survey | · | 2.6 km | MPC · JPL |
| 352061 | 2006 WV_{50} | — | November 16, 2006 | Kitt Peak | Spacewatch | EOS | 2.5 km | MPC · JPL |
| 352062 | 2006 WA_{57} | — | November 16, 2006 | Kitt Peak | Spacewatch | · | 2.6 km | MPC · JPL |
| 352063 | 2006 WU_{58} | — | November 17, 2006 | Kitt Peak | Spacewatch | · | 2.5 km | MPC · JPL |
| 352064 | 2006 WM_{72} | — | November 18, 2006 | Kitt Peak | Spacewatch | · | 1.8 km | MPC · JPL |
| 352065 | 2006 WL_{73} | — | November 18, 2006 | Kitt Peak | Spacewatch | · | 3.0 km | MPC · JPL |
| 352066 | 2006 WM_{73} | — | November 18, 2006 | Kitt Peak | Spacewatch | · | 2.2 km | MPC · JPL |
| 352067 | 2006 WG_{85} | — | November 18, 2006 | Kitt Peak | Spacewatch | · | 2.0 km | MPC · JPL |
| 352068 | 2006 WL_{94} | — | November 19, 2006 | Kitt Peak | Spacewatch | fast | 2.0 km | MPC · JPL |
| 352069 | 2006 WY_{107} | — | October 29, 2006 | Mount Lemmon | Mount Lemmon Survey | · | 3.0 km | MPC · JPL |
| 352070 | 2006 WH_{108} | — | November 19, 2006 | Socorro | LINEAR | · | 6.2 km | MPC · JPL |
| 352071 | 2006 WC_{111} | — | November 11, 2006 | Kitt Peak | Spacewatch | · | 2.6 km | MPC · JPL |
| 352072 | 2006 WQ_{111} | — | November 19, 2006 | Kitt Peak | Spacewatch | THM | 2.2 km | MPC · JPL |
| 352073 | 2006 WW_{113} | — | November 20, 2006 | Catalina | CSS | · | 3.0 km | MPC · JPL |
| 352074 | 2006 WB_{116} | — | November 20, 2006 | Socorro | LINEAR | · | 4.3 km | MPC · JPL |
| 352075 | 2006 WM_{128} | — | November 26, 2006 | 7300 | W. K. Y. Yeung | · | 2.8 km | MPC · JPL |
| 352076 | 2006 WN_{130} | — | November 26, 2006 | Las Cruces | Dixon, D. S. | · | 2.4 km | MPC · JPL |
| 352077 | 2006 WU_{132} | — | October 27, 2006 | Mount Lemmon | Mount Lemmon Survey | · | 2.6 km | MPC · JPL |
| 352078 | 2006 WC_{149} | — | November 16, 2006 | Kitt Peak | Spacewatch | · | 3.0 km | MPC · JPL |
| 352079 | 2006 WM_{151} | — | November 21, 2006 | Mount Lemmon | Mount Lemmon Survey | T_{j} (2.99) | 5.4 km | MPC · JPL |
| 352080 | 2006 WN_{174} | — | November 11, 2006 | Kitt Peak | Spacewatch | · | 3.9 km | MPC · JPL |
| 352081 | 2006 WT_{187} | — | November 24, 2006 | Kitt Peak | Spacewatch | · | 3.4 km | MPC · JPL |
| 352082 | 2006 WG_{188} | — | November 24, 2006 | Kitt Peak | Spacewatch | · | 3.2 km | MPC · JPL |
| 352083 | 2006 WB_{193} | — | November 27, 2006 | Kitt Peak | Spacewatch | THM | 2.1 km | MPC · JPL |
| 352084 | 2006 WH_{193} | — | November 27, 2006 | Kitt Peak | Spacewatch | · | 6.1 km | MPC · JPL |
| 352085 | 2006 WZ_{199} | — | November 16, 2006 | Kitt Peak | Spacewatch | · | 5.8 km | MPC · JPL |
| 352086 | 2006 XW_{6} | — | December 9, 2006 | Kitt Peak | Spacewatch | HYG | 3.7 km | MPC · JPL |
| 352087 | 2006 XY_{8} | — | December 9, 2006 | Kitt Peak | Spacewatch | HYG | 2.5 km | MPC · JPL |
| 352088 | 2006 XD_{11} | — | December 10, 2006 | Kitt Peak | Spacewatch | · | 3.5 km | MPC · JPL |
| 352089 | 2006 XZ_{22} | — | December 12, 2006 | Kitt Peak | Spacewatch | · | 2.7 km | MPC · JPL |
| 352090 | 2006 XU_{23} | — | August 7, 2005 | Needville | J. Dellinger | EOS | 1.9 km | MPC · JPL |
| 352091 | 2006 XC_{31} | — | December 12, 2006 | Marly | P. Kocher | LUT | 5.9 km | MPC · JPL |
| 352092 | 2006 XC_{56} | — | December 13, 2006 | Mount Lemmon | Mount Lemmon Survey | · | 4.9 km | MPC · JPL |
| 352093 | 2006 XW_{63} | — | December 9, 2006 | Kitt Peak | Spacewatch | · | 3.5 km | MPC · JPL |
| 352094 | 2006 XM_{71} | — | December 13, 2006 | Catalina | CSS | · | 4.7 km | MPC · JPL |
| 352095 | 2006 XR_{71} | — | December 13, 2006 | Kitt Peak | Spacewatch | · | 3.4 km | MPC · JPL |
| 352096 | 2006 YP_{10} | — | December 21, 2006 | Mount Lemmon | Mount Lemmon Survey | · | 4.0 km | MPC · JPL |
| 352097 | 2006 YN_{26} | — | December 21, 2006 | Kitt Peak | Spacewatch | · | 2.8 km | MPC · JPL |
| 352098 | 2006 YD_{40} | — | December 22, 2006 | Kitt Peak | Spacewatch | · | 3.7 km | MPC · JPL |
| 352099 | 2006 YP_{45} | — | December 21, 2006 | Mount Lemmon | Mount Lemmon Survey | · | 3.8 km | MPC · JPL |
| 352100 | 2006 YM_{53} | — | December 24, 2006 | Kitt Peak | Spacewatch | · | 4.7 km | MPC · JPL |

== 352101–352200 ==
back to top

| Designation | | | Discovery | | | Properties | | Ref |
| Permanent | Provisional | Named after | Date | Site | Discoverer(s) | Category | Diam. | Ref |
|---|---|---|---|---|---|---|---|---|
| 352101 | 2007 AE_{6} | — | January 8, 2007 | Mount Lemmon | Mount Lemmon Survey | · | 5.4 km | MPC · JPL |
| 352102 | 2007 AG_{12} | — | January 13, 2007 | Mauna Kea | D. D. Balam | APO · PHA | 500 m | MPC · JPL |
| 352103 | 2007 AN_{20} | — | January 10, 2007 | Catalina | CSS | EUP | 7.0 km | MPC · JPL |
| 352104 | 2007 BA_{5} | — | January 17, 2007 | Kitt Peak | Spacewatch | · | 4.9 km | MPC · JPL |
| 352105 | 2007 BS_{9} | — | January 17, 2007 | Palomar | NEAT | · | 4.2 km | MPC · JPL |
| 352106 | 2007 BB_{17} | — | January 17, 2007 | Mount Lemmon | Mount Lemmon Survey | · | 4.2 km | MPC · JPL |
| 352107 | 2007 BF_{20} | — | January 23, 2007 | Socorro | LINEAR | · | 6.1 km | MPC · JPL |
| 352108 | 2007 BX_{55} | — | January 24, 2007 | Socorro | LINEAR | T_{j} (2.96) | 5.7 km | MPC · JPL |
| 352109 | 2007 BD_{59} | — | December 21, 2006 | Kitt Peak | Spacewatch | · | 4.0 km | MPC · JPL |
| 352110 | 2007 CM_{22} | — | February 6, 2007 | Mount Lemmon | Mount Lemmon Survey | · | 1.4 km | MPC · JPL |
| 352111 | 2007 CS_{55} | — | February 13, 2007 | Mount Lemmon | Mount Lemmon Survey | HYG | 4.0 km | MPC · JPL |
| 352112 | 2007 CO_{59} | — | February 10, 2007 | Catalina | CSS | TIR | 3.5 km | MPC · JPL |
| 352113 | 2007 CU_{59} | — | January 15, 2007 | Anderson Mesa | LONEOS | · | 4.7 km | MPC · JPL |
| 352114 | 2007 CG_{65} | — | February 13, 2007 | Mount Lemmon | Mount Lemmon Survey | · | 4.9 km | MPC · JPL |
| 352115 | 2007 DD_{32} | — | February 17, 2007 | Kitt Peak | Spacewatch | CYB | 4.1 km | MPC · JPL |
| 352116 | 2007 DU_{98} | — | February 25, 2007 | Mount Lemmon | Mount Lemmon Survey | · | 590 m | MPC · JPL |
| 352117 | 2007 EB_{39} | — | March 12, 2007 | Mount Lemmon | Mount Lemmon Survey | · | 1 km | MPC · JPL |
| 352118 | 2007 EK_{56} | — | March 12, 2007 | Mount Lemmon | Mount Lemmon Survey | (883) | 870 m | MPC · JPL |
| 352119 | 2007 EO_{139} | — | March 12, 2007 | Kitt Peak | Spacewatch | · | 620 m | MPC · JPL |
| 352120 | 2007 EO_{141} | — | March 12, 2007 | Kitt Peak | Spacewatch | · | 3.9 km | MPC · JPL |
| 352121 | 2007 EP_{182} | — | February 26, 2007 | Mount Lemmon | Mount Lemmon Survey | · | 750 m | MPC · JPL |
| 352122 | 2007 EU_{190} | — | March 13, 2007 | Catalina | CSS | · | 1.2 km | MPC · JPL |
| 352123 | 2007 EZ_{198} | — | March 10, 2007 | Catalina | CSS | EUP | 5.1 km | MPC · JPL |
| 352124 | 2007 EZ_{214} | — | March 13, 2007 | Kitt Peak | Spacewatch | · | 930 m | MPC · JPL |
| 352125 | 2007 EJ_{223} | — | March 11, 2007 | Kitt Peak | Spacewatch | · | 1.8 km | MPC · JPL |
| 352126 | 2007 FJ_{46} | — | March 26, 2007 | Mount Lemmon | Mount Lemmon Survey | · | 720 m | MPC · JPL |
| 352127 | 2007 FO_{49} | — | March 25, 2007 | Mount Lemmon | Mount Lemmon Survey | PHO | 1.5 km | MPC · JPL |
| 352128 | 2007 GZ_{40} | — | April 14, 2007 | Kitt Peak | Spacewatch | · | 920 m | MPC · JPL |
| 352129 | 2007 GO_{62} | — | December 7, 2005 | Kitt Peak | Spacewatch | · | 1.1 km | MPC · JPL |
| 352130 | 2007 GY_{65} | — | March 11, 2007 | Mount Lemmon | Mount Lemmon Survey | · | 820 m | MPC · JPL |
| 352131 | 2007 GU_{73} | — | April 15, 2007 | Catalina | CSS | MAR | 1.5 km | MPC · JPL |
| 352132 | 2007 HF_{23} | — | April 18, 2007 | Kitt Peak | Spacewatch | · | 1.2 km | MPC · JPL |
| 352133 | 2007 HH_{55} | — | April 22, 2007 | Kitt Peak | Spacewatch | · | 770 m | MPC · JPL |
| 352134 | 2007 HJ_{61} | — | April 20, 2007 | Kitt Peak | Spacewatch | V | 580 m | MPC · JPL |
| 352135 | 2007 HX_{68} | — | April 23, 2007 | Kitt Peak | Spacewatch | · | 810 m | MPC · JPL |
| 352136 | 2007 HW_{77} | — | April 23, 2007 | Mount Lemmon | Mount Lemmon Survey | · | 750 m | MPC · JPL |
| 352137 | 2007 HQ_{97} | — | April 22, 2007 | Catalina | CSS | · | 1.2 km | MPC · JPL |
| 352138 | 2007 JN_{8} | — | May 9, 2007 | Mount Lemmon | Mount Lemmon Survey | · | 780 m | MPC · JPL |
| 352139 | 2007 JL_{26} | — | May 9, 2007 | Kitt Peak | Spacewatch | · | 850 m | MPC · JPL |
| 352140 | 2007 JV_{38} | — | May 13, 2007 | Mount Lemmon | Mount Lemmon Survey | · | 790 m | MPC · JPL |
| 352141 | 2007 JB_{45} | — | May 11, 2007 | Mount Lemmon | Mount Lemmon Survey | · | 870 m | MPC · JPL |
| 352142 | 2007 LB_{18} | — | June 13, 2007 | Kitt Peak | Spacewatch | · | 1.4 km | MPC · JPL |
| 352143 | 2007 LR_{32} | — | June 15, 2007 | Socorro | LINEAR | AMO +1km | 1.3 km | MPC · JPL |
| 352144 | 2007 MU_{12} | — | June 21, 2007 | Mount Lemmon | Mount Lemmon Survey | · | 690 m | MPC · JPL |
| 352145 | 2007 MC_{17} | — | June 21, 2007 | Mount Lemmon | Mount Lemmon Survey | · | 1.7 km | MPC · JPL |
| 352146 | 2007 MH_{27} | — | June 23, 2007 | Siding Spring | SSS | · | 2.2 km | MPC · JPL |
| 352147 | 2007 OD_{5} | — | July 23, 2007 | Tiki | S. F. Hönig, Teamo, N. | MAS | 770 m | MPC · JPL |
| 352148 Tarcisiozani | 2007 PH | Tarcisiozani | August 4, 2007 | Lumezzane | M. Micheli, Pizzetti, G. P. | · | 1.7 km | MPC · JPL |
| 352149 | 2007 PU_{7} | — | August 7, 2007 | Reedy Creek | J. Broughton | · | 1.7 km | MPC · JPL |
| 352150 | 2007 PA_{10} | — | August 8, 2007 | Socorro | LINEAR | · | 1.4 km | MPC · JPL |
| 352151 | 2007 PC_{10} | — | August 8, 2007 | Socorro | LINEAR | · | 1.6 km | MPC · JPL |
| 352152 | 2007 PZ_{22} | — | August 11, 2007 | Socorro | LINEAR | · | 2.1 km | MPC · JPL |
| 352153 | 2007 PM_{24} | — | August 12, 2007 | Socorro | LINEAR | · | 2.2 km | MPC · JPL |
| 352154 | 2007 PV_{45} | — | August 9, 2007 | Kitt Peak | Spacewatch | · | 1.3 km | MPC · JPL |
| 352155 | 2007 PP_{47} | — | August 10, 2007 | Kitt Peak | Spacewatch | L4 | 10 km | MPC · JPL |
| 352156 | 2007 PE_{48} | — | August 11, 2007 | Siding Spring | SSS | · | 2.2 km | MPC · JPL |
| 352157 | 2007 PB_{50} | — | August 10, 2007 | Kitt Peak | Spacewatch | · | 1.3 km | MPC · JPL |
| 352158 | 2007 QN | — | October 1, 2003 | Anderson Mesa | LONEOS | JUN | 1.4 km | MPC · JPL |
| 352159 | 2007 QS_{11} | — | August 23, 2007 | Kitt Peak | Spacewatch | · | 1.7 km | MPC · JPL |
| 352160 | 2007 RE | — | September 1, 2007 | Siding Spring | K. Sárneczky, L. Kiss | · | 1.3 km | MPC · JPL |
| 352161 | 2007 RJ_{7} | — | September 6, 2007 | Dauban | Chante-Perdrix | · | 2.1 km | MPC · JPL |
| 352162 | 2007 RV_{15} | — | September 12, 2007 | Taunus | E. Schwab, R. Kling | · | 1.9 km | MPC · JPL |
| 352163 | 2007 RO_{19} | — | September 5, 2007 | Lulin | LUSS | · | 2.3 km | MPC · JPL |
| 352164 | 2007 RE_{24} | — | September 3, 2007 | Catalina | CSS | · | 1.9 km | MPC · JPL |
| 352165 | 2007 RL_{24} | — | September 3, 2007 | Catalina | CSS | · | 2.3 km | MPC · JPL |
| 352166 | 2007 RM_{29} | — | September 4, 2007 | Catalina | CSS | · | 1.8 km | MPC · JPL |
| 352167 | 2007 RN_{39} | — | September 8, 2007 | Andrushivka | Andrushivka | · | 1.1 km | MPC · JPL |
| 352168 | 2007 RB_{41} | — | August 16, 2007 | XuYi | PMO NEO Survey Program | EUN | 1.2 km | MPC · JPL |
| 352169 | 2007 RE_{53} | — | September 9, 2007 | Kitt Peak | Spacewatch | · | 2.2 km | MPC · JPL |
| 352170 | 2007 RZ_{66} | — | September 10, 2007 | Mount Lemmon | Mount Lemmon Survey | · | 1.2 km | MPC · JPL |
| 352171 | 2007 RP_{75} | — | September 10, 2007 | Mount Lemmon | Mount Lemmon Survey | · | 950 m | MPC · JPL |
| 352172 | 2007 RQ_{78} | — | September 10, 2007 | Mount Lemmon | Mount Lemmon Survey | · | 1.1 km | MPC · JPL |
| 352173 | 2007 RF_{81} | — | September 10, 2007 | Catalina | CSS | · | 2.0 km | MPC · JPL |
| 352174 | 2007 RH_{90} | — | September 10, 2007 | Mount Lemmon | Mount Lemmon Survey | · | 1.4 km | MPC · JPL |
| 352175 | 2007 RT_{93} | — | September 10, 2007 | Kitt Peak | Spacewatch | · | 2.4 km | MPC · JPL |
| 352176 | 2007 RM_{114} | — | September 11, 2007 | Kitt Peak | Spacewatch | WIT | 1.2 km | MPC · JPL |
| 352177 | 2007 RM_{118} | — | September 11, 2007 | Mount Lemmon | Mount Lemmon Survey | ADE | 2.7 km | MPC · JPL |
| 352178 | 2007 RN_{125} | — | September 12, 2007 | Kitt Peak | Spacewatch | · | 1.1 km | MPC · JPL |
| 352179 | 2007 RP_{138} | — | September 15, 2007 | Charleston | Astronomical Research Observatory | · | 1.8 km | MPC · JPL |
| 352180 | 2007 RD_{143} | — | September 5, 2007 | Catalina | CSS | · | 1.9 km | MPC · JPL |
| 352181 | 2007 RL_{147} | — | September 11, 2007 | Purple Mountain | PMO NEO Survey Program | · | 2.5 km | MPC · JPL |
| 352182 | 2007 RM_{165} | — | September 10, 2007 | Kitt Peak | Spacewatch | · | 1.4 km | MPC · JPL |
| 352183 | 2007 RM_{173} | — | September 10, 2007 | Kitt Peak | Spacewatch | · | 1.9 km | MPC · JPL |
| 352184 | 2007 RZ_{184} | — | September 13, 2007 | Mount Lemmon | Mount Lemmon Survey | · | 2.0 km | MPC · JPL |
| 352185 | 2007 RW_{189} | — | September 10, 2007 | Kitt Peak | Spacewatch | · | 1.5 km | MPC · JPL |
| 352186 | 2007 RN_{204} | — | September 9, 2007 | Kitt Peak | Spacewatch | · | 1.7 km | MPC · JPL |
| 352187 | 2007 RU_{207} | — | September 10, 2007 | Kitt Peak | Spacewatch | (5) | 1.3 km | MPC · JPL |
| 352188 | 2007 RF_{213} | — | September 12, 2007 | Mount Lemmon | Mount Lemmon Survey | · | 2.1 km | MPC · JPL |
| 352189 | 2007 RK_{221} | — | September 14, 2007 | Catalina | CSS | EUN | 1.7 km | MPC · JPL |
| 352190 | 2007 RP_{227} | — | September 10, 2007 | Mount Lemmon | Mount Lemmon Survey | · | 2.0 km | MPC · JPL |
| 352191 | 2007 RS_{230} | — | September 11, 2007 | Kitt Peak | Spacewatch | · | 1.7 km | MPC · JPL |
| 352192 | 2007 RD_{233} | — | September 12, 2007 | Catalina | CSS | · | 2.1 km | MPC · JPL |
| 352193 | 2007 RM_{243} | — | September 15, 2007 | Socorro | LINEAR | (5) | 1.5 km | MPC · JPL |
| 352194 | 2007 RX_{246} | — | September 12, 2007 | Mount Lemmon | Mount Lemmon Survey | · | 1.7 km | MPC · JPL |
| 352195 | 2007 RQ_{249} | — | September 13, 2007 | Catalina | CSS | MAR | 1.3 km | MPC · JPL |
| 352196 | 2007 RS_{272} | — | September 15, 2007 | Kitt Peak | Spacewatch | · | 1.6 km | MPC · JPL |
| 352197 | 2007 RF_{277} | — | September 5, 2007 | Catalina | CSS | JUN | 1.7 km | MPC · JPL |
| 352198 | 2007 RT_{283} | — | September 3, 2007 | Catalina | CSS | · | 1.3 km | MPC · JPL |
| 352199 | 2007 RF_{284} | — | September 10, 2007 | Kitt Peak | Spacewatch | · | 1.2 km | MPC · JPL |
| 352200 | 2007 RZ_{284} | — | September 12, 2007 | Mount Lemmon | Mount Lemmon Survey | · | 1.1 km | MPC · JPL |

== 352201–352300 ==
back to top

| Designation | | | Discovery | | | Properties | | Ref |
| Permanent | Provisional | Named after | Date | Site | Discoverer(s) | Category | Diam. | Ref |
|---|---|---|---|---|---|---|---|---|
| 352201 | 2007 RA_{288} | — | September 10, 2007 | Kitt Peak | Spacewatch | (5) | 990 m | MPC · JPL |
| 352202 | 2007 RY_{289} | — | September 14, 2007 | Mount Lemmon | Mount Lemmon Survey | · | 2.1 km | MPC · JPL |
| 352203 | 2007 RF_{291} | — | September 15, 2007 | Mount Lemmon | Mount Lemmon Survey | · | 3.2 km | MPC · JPL |
| 352204 | 2007 RR_{295} | — | September 14, 2007 | Mount Lemmon | Mount Lemmon Survey | EUN | 1.2 km | MPC · JPL |
| 352205 | 2007 RH_{311} | — | September 9, 2007 | Anderson Mesa | LONEOS | · | 1.5 km | MPC · JPL |
| 352206 | 2007 RV_{312} | — | September 15, 2007 | Anderson Mesa | LONEOS | AEO | 1.4 km | MPC · JPL |
| 352207 | 2007 RZ_{315} | — | September 13, 2007 | Catalina | CSS | · | 1.3 km | MPC · JPL |
| 352208 | 2007 SV_{10} | — | September 21, 2007 | Remanzacco | Remanzacco | · | 1.4 km | MPC · JPL |
| 352209 | 2007 SH_{11} | — | September 20, 2007 | Catalina | CSS | · | 2.2 km | MPC · JPL |
| 352210 | 2007 SB_{12} | — | September 22, 2007 | Črni Vrh | Matičič, S. | (1547) | 1.9 km | MPC · JPL |
| 352211 | 2007 SZ_{12} | — | September 19, 2007 | Kitt Peak | Spacewatch | · | 1.4 km | MPC · JPL |
| 352212 | 2007 SE_{22} | — | September 24, 2007 | Kitt Peak | Spacewatch | · | 1.7 km | MPC · JPL |
| 352213 | 2007 TW_{2} | — | October 3, 2007 | 7300 | W. K. Y. Yeung | · | 1.5 km | MPC · JPL |
| 352214 Szczecin | 2007 TY_{4} | Szczecin | October 2, 2007 | Charleston | Astronomical Research Observatory | · | 1.3 km | MPC · JPL |
| 352215 | 2007 TN_{18} | — | October 4, 2007 | Goodricke-Pigott | R. A. Tucker | · | 2.1 km | MPC · JPL |
| 352216 | 2007 TJ_{20} | — | October 5, 2007 | Kitt Peak | Spacewatch | · | 1.5 km | MPC · JPL |
| 352217 | 2007 TJ_{24} | — | October 9, 2007 | Mount Lemmon | Mount Lemmon Survey | · | 1.9 km | MPC · JPL |
| 352218 | 2007 TP_{30} | — | October 4, 2007 | Kitt Peak | Spacewatch | EUN | 1.6 km | MPC · JPL |
| 352219 | 2007 TZ_{31} | — | October 5, 2007 | Siding Spring | SSS | · | 2.1 km | MPC · JPL |
| 352220 | 2007 TB_{33} | — | October 6, 2007 | Kitt Peak | Spacewatch | · | 1.7 km | MPC · JPL |
| 352221 | 2007 TC_{34} | — | October 6, 2007 | Kitt Peak | Spacewatch | · | 2.2 km | MPC · JPL |
| 352222 | 2007 TQ_{35} | — | October 7, 2007 | Catalina | CSS | · | 3.2 km | MPC · JPL |
| 352223 | 2007 TD_{56} | — | October 4, 2007 | Kitt Peak | Spacewatch | DOR | 2.1 km | MPC · JPL |
| 352224 | 2007 TZ_{63} | — | October 7, 2007 | Mount Lemmon | Mount Lemmon Survey | · | 1.7 km | MPC · JPL |
| 352225 | 2007 TB_{65} | — | October 7, 2007 | Mount Lemmon | Mount Lemmon Survey | · | 2.3 km | MPC · JPL |
| 352226 | 2007 TT_{65} | — | September 14, 2007 | Mount Lemmon | Mount Lemmon Survey | H | 480 m | MPC · JPL |
| 352227 | 2007 TV_{66} | — | October 12, 2007 | 7300 | W. K. Y. Yeung | · | 1.5 km | MPC · JPL |
| 352228 | 2007 TF_{67} | — | October 3, 2007 | Purple Mountain | PMO NEO Survey Program | · | 2.6 km | MPC · JPL |
| 352229 | 2007 TD_{70} | — | October 10, 2007 | Mount Lemmon | Mount Lemmon Survey | · | 1.3 km | MPC · JPL |
| 352230 | 2007 TD_{73} | — | October 14, 2007 | Altschwendt | W. Ries | · | 1.3 km | MPC · JPL |
| 352231 | 2007 TL_{78} | — | October 5, 2007 | Kitt Peak | Spacewatch | · | 1.8 km | MPC · JPL |
| 352232 | 2007 TJ_{79} | — | October 5, 2007 | Kitt Peak | Spacewatch | · | 1.3 km | MPC · JPL |
| 352233 | 2007 TP_{82} | — | October 8, 2007 | Mount Lemmon | Mount Lemmon Survey | · | 1.2 km | MPC · JPL |
| 352234 | 2007 TR_{82} | — | October 8, 2007 | Mount Lemmon | Mount Lemmon Survey | · | 1.3 km | MPC · JPL |
| 352235 | 2007 TW_{107} | — | October 4, 2007 | Catalina | CSS | · | 1.7 km | MPC · JPL |
| 352236 | 2007 TO_{111} | — | October 8, 2007 | Catalina | CSS | · | 1.3 km | MPC · JPL |
| 352237 | 2007 TY_{125} | — | October 6, 2007 | Kitt Peak | Spacewatch | · | 1.8 km | MPC · JPL |
| 352238 | 2007 TB_{132} | — | October 7, 2007 | Mount Lemmon | Mount Lemmon Survey | · | 2.2 km | MPC · JPL |
| 352239 | 2007 TV_{134} | — | October 8, 2007 | Kitt Peak | Spacewatch | · | 790 m | MPC · JPL |
| 352240 | 2007 TZ_{136} | — | October 8, 2007 | Catalina | CSS | · | 2.2 km | MPC · JPL |
| 352241 | 2007 TS_{137} | — | October 8, 2007 | Catalina | CSS | H | 660 m | MPC · JPL |
| 352242 | 2007 TG_{139} | — | October 9, 2007 | Kitt Peak | Spacewatch | · | 1.9 km | MPC · JPL |
| 352243 | 2007 TW_{142} | — | October 14, 2007 | Dauban | Chante-Perdrix | · | 1.8 km | MPC · JPL |
| 352244 | 2007 TO_{143} | — | October 6, 2007 | Socorro | LINEAR | NEM | 2.4 km | MPC · JPL |
| 352245 | 2007 TO_{150} | — | October 9, 2007 | Socorro | LINEAR | · | 1.9 km | MPC · JPL |
| 352246 | 2007 TB_{161} | — | October 9, 2007 | Dauban | Chante-Perdrix | · | 2.5 km | MPC · JPL |
| 352247 | 2007 TQ_{162} | — | October 11, 2007 | Socorro | LINEAR | · | 1.8 km | MPC · JPL |
| 352248 | 2007 TJ_{163} | — | October 11, 2007 | Socorro | LINEAR | · | 1.9 km | MPC · JPL |
| 352249 | 2007 TC_{165} | — | October 11, 2007 | Socorro | LINEAR | · | 2.9 km | MPC · JPL |
| 352250 | 2007 TC_{168} | — | October 12, 2007 | Socorro | LINEAR | (13314) | 2.0 km | MPC · JPL |
| 352251 | 2007 TV_{169} | — | October 12, 2007 | Socorro | LINEAR | · | 1.7 km | MPC · JPL |
| 352252 | 2007 TF_{172} | — | October 13, 2007 | Socorro | LINEAR | · | 2.6 km | MPC · JPL |
| 352253 | 2007 TB_{174} | — | October 4, 2007 | Kitt Peak | Spacewatch | · | 2.0 km | MPC · JPL |
| 352254 | 2007 TJ_{178} | — | September 10, 2007 | Catalina | CSS | · | 1.8 km | MPC · JPL |
| 352255 | 2007 TZ_{180} | — | October 8, 2007 | Anderson Mesa | LONEOS | · | 1.7 km | MPC · JPL |
| 352256 | 2007 TS_{186} | — | October 13, 2007 | Socorro | LINEAR | · | 1.7 km | MPC · JPL |
| 352257 | 2007 TQ_{188} | — | October 4, 2007 | Mount Lemmon | Mount Lemmon Survey | · | 960 m | MPC · JPL |
| 352258 | 2007 TF_{195} | — | October 7, 2007 | Mount Lemmon | Mount Lemmon Survey | · | 1.7 km | MPC · JPL |
| 352259 | 2007 TG_{201} | — | October 8, 2007 | Kitt Peak | Spacewatch | · | 1.4 km | MPC · JPL |
| 352260 | 2007 TR_{209} | — | October 11, 2007 | Mount Lemmon | Mount Lemmon Survey | · | 1.4 km | MPC · JPL |
| 352261 | 2007 TY_{213} | — | October 7, 2007 | Kitt Peak | Spacewatch | · | 1.8 km | MPC · JPL |
| 352262 | 2007 TU_{214} | — | October 7, 2007 | Kitt Peak | Spacewatch | · | 1.7 km | MPC · JPL |
| 352263 | 2007 TT_{215} | — | October 7, 2007 | Kitt Peak | Spacewatch | · | 1.5 km | MPC · JPL |
| 352264 | 2007 TG_{222} | — | October 9, 2007 | Kitt Peak | Spacewatch | · | 1.3 km | MPC · JPL |
| 352265 | 2007 TJ_{247} | — | October 9, 2007 | Purple Mountain | PMO NEO Survey Program | · | 2.1 km | MPC · JPL |
| 352266 | 2007 TM_{250} | — | October 11, 2007 | Mount Lemmon | Mount Lemmon Survey | · | 1.1 km | MPC · JPL |
| 352267 | 2007 TM_{266} | — | October 7, 2007 | Catalina | CSS | · | 2.2 km | MPC · JPL |
| 352268 | 2007 TB_{269} | — | October 9, 2007 | Kitt Peak | Spacewatch | · | 2.1 km | MPC · JPL |
| 352269 | 2007 TD_{270} | — | September 13, 2002 | Palomar | NEAT | HOF | 2.5 km | MPC · JPL |
| 352270 | 2007 TX_{278} | — | October 11, 2007 | Mount Lemmon | Mount Lemmon Survey | · | 2.3 km | MPC · JPL |
| 352271 | 2007 TC_{284} | — | October 9, 2007 | Mount Lemmon | Mount Lemmon Survey | · | 2.8 km | MPC · JPL |
| 352272 | 2007 TQ_{285} | — | October 9, 2007 | Mount Lemmon | Mount Lemmon Survey | · | 1.2 km | MPC · JPL |
| 352273 Turrell | 2007 TF_{298} | Turrell | October 11, 2007 | Anderson Mesa | Wasserman, L. H. | · | 1.8 km | MPC · JPL |
| 352274 | 2007 TZ_{306} | — | October 8, 2007 | Mount Lemmon | Mount Lemmon Survey | · | 2.9 km | MPC · JPL |
| 352275 | 2007 TV_{310} | — | October 11, 2007 | Kitt Peak | Spacewatch | · | 2.1 km | MPC · JPL |
| 352276 | 2007 TQ_{322} | — | October 11, 2007 | Kitt Peak | Spacewatch | · | 1.3 km | MPC · JPL |
| 352277 | 2007 TZ_{337} | — | October 13, 2007 | Catalina | CSS | · | 1.8 km | MPC · JPL |
| 352278 | 2007 TZ_{350} | — | October 14, 2007 | Mount Lemmon | Mount Lemmon Survey | · | 1.2 km | MPC · JPL |
| 352279 | 2007 TS_{353} | — | October 9, 2007 | Kitt Peak | Spacewatch | · | 1.2 km | MPC · JPL |
| 352280 | 2007 TT_{371} | — | October 18, 2003 | Kitt Peak | Spacewatch | · | 1.6 km | MPC · JPL |
| 352281 | 2007 TO_{372} | — | October 13, 2007 | Anderson Mesa | LONEOS | · | 2.7 km | MPC · JPL |
| 352282 | 2007 TR_{372} | — | October 13, 2007 | Altschwendt | W. Ries | · | 1.5 km | MPC · JPL |
| 352283 | 2007 TN_{377} | — | October 11, 2007 | Kitt Peak | Spacewatch | · | 2.6 km | MPC · JPL |
| 352284 | 2007 TX_{378} | — | October 13, 2007 | Catalina | CSS | · | 2.0 km | MPC · JPL |
| 352285 | 2007 TQ_{388} | — | October 13, 2007 | Catalina | CSS | · | 1.2 km | MPC · JPL |
| 352286 | 2007 TR_{392} | — | October 15, 2007 | Mount Lemmon | Mount Lemmon Survey | · | 1.8 km | MPC · JPL |
| 352287 | 2007 TM_{396} | — | October 15, 2007 | Kitt Peak | Spacewatch | · | 2.2 km | MPC · JPL |
| 352288 | 2007 TS_{399} | — | October 15, 2007 | Kitt Peak | Spacewatch | · | 2.1 km | MPC · JPL |
| 352289 | 2007 TU_{411} | — | September 12, 2007 | Catalina | CSS | · | 2.2 km | MPC · JPL |
| 352290 | 2007 TY_{413} | — | February 12, 2004 | Kitt Peak | Spacewatch | · | 2.2 km | MPC · JPL |
| 352291 | 2007 TZ_{413} | — | January 15, 2004 | Kitt Peak | Spacewatch | · | 1.6 km | MPC · JPL |
| 352292 | 2007 TG_{419} | — | October 10, 2007 | Lulin | LUSS | · | 1.6 km | MPC · JPL |
| 352293 | 2007 TR_{419} | — | October 2, 2007 | Siding Spring | SSS | · | 1.7 km | MPC · JPL |
| 352294 | 2007 TG_{421} | — | October 11, 2007 | Catalina | CSS | MAR | 1.5 km | MPC · JPL |
| 352295 | 2007 TG_{426} | — | October 9, 2007 | Mount Lemmon | Mount Lemmon Survey | · | 1.6 km | MPC · JPL |
| 352296 | 2007 TW_{426} | — | October 9, 2007 | Mount Lemmon | Mount Lemmon Survey | · | 1.5 km | MPC · JPL |
| 352297 | 2007 TW_{429} | — | October 13, 2007 | Mount Lemmon | Mount Lemmon Survey | · | 1.8 km | MPC · JPL |
| 352298 | 2007 TT_{434} | — | October 11, 2007 | Catalina | CSS | · | 3.1 km | MPC · JPL |
| 352299 | 2007 TB_{441} | — | October 10, 2007 | Catalina | CSS | · | 1.7 km | MPC · JPL |
| 352300 | 2007 TO_{442} | — | October 8, 2007 | Anderson Mesa | LONEOS | · | 2.7 km | MPC · JPL |

== 352301–352400 ==
back to top

| Designation | | | Discovery | | | Properties | | Ref |
| Permanent | Provisional | Named after | Date | Site | Discoverer(s) | Category | Diam. | Ref |
|---|---|---|---|---|---|---|---|---|
| 352301 | 2007 TV_{444} | — | December 15, 1999 | Kitt Peak | Spacewatch | · | 1.5 km | MPC · JPL |
| 352302 | 2007 TO_{448} | — | October 8, 2007 | Catalina | CSS | · | 2.5 km | MPC · JPL |
| 352303 | 2007 TF_{453} | — | October 15, 2007 | Mount Lemmon | Mount Lemmon Survey | · | 3.9 km | MPC · JPL |
| 352304 | 2007 UT_{5} | — | October 18, 2007 | Junk Bond | D. Healy | · | 5.9 km | MPC · JPL |
| 352305 | 2007 UF_{8} | — | October 16, 2007 | Catalina | CSS | · | 2.4 km | MPC · JPL |
| 352306 | 2007 UB_{15} | — | October 18, 2007 | Mount Lemmon | Mount Lemmon Survey | · | 1.4 km | MPC · JPL |
| 352307 | 2007 UT_{25} | — | October 16, 2007 | Kitt Peak | Spacewatch | WIT | 990 m | MPC · JPL |
| 352308 | 2007 UE_{36} | — | October 19, 2007 | Catalina | CSS | · | 1.1 km | MPC · JPL |
| 352309 | 2007 UZ_{46} | — | October 20, 2007 | Catalina | CSS | · | 2.0 km | MPC · JPL |
| 352310 | 2007 UM_{47} | — | October 19, 2007 | Catalina | CSS | ADE | 2.8 km | MPC · JPL |
| 352311 | 2007 UP_{59} | — | October 30, 2007 | Mount Lemmon | Mount Lemmon Survey | · | 1.9 km | MPC · JPL |
| 352312 | 2007 UE_{62} | — | October 30, 2007 | Mount Lemmon | Mount Lemmon Survey | · | 1.4 km | MPC · JPL |
| 352313 | 2007 UP_{74} | — | October 31, 2007 | Mount Lemmon | Mount Lemmon Survey | · | 2.0 km | MPC · JPL |
| 352314 | 2007 UR_{79} | — | October 19, 2007 | Kitt Peak | Spacewatch | · | 1.6 km | MPC · JPL |
| 352315 | 2007 UF_{81} | — | October 30, 2007 | Kitt Peak | Spacewatch | · | 1.8 km | MPC · JPL |
| 352316 | 2007 US_{82} | — | October 30, 2007 | Kitt Peak | Spacewatch | · | 1.7 km | MPC · JPL |
| 352317 | 2007 UE_{86} | — | October 30, 2007 | Kitt Peak | Spacewatch | · | 1.6 km | MPC · JPL |
| 352318 | 2007 UM_{91} | — | October 30, 2007 | Mount Lemmon | Mount Lemmon Survey | · | 1.6 km | MPC · JPL |
| 352319 | 2007 UZ_{103} | — | October 20, 2007 | Mount Lemmon | Mount Lemmon Survey | AGN | 1.4 km | MPC · JPL |
| 352320 | 2007 UN_{106} | — | October 31, 2007 | Mount Lemmon | Mount Lemmon Survey | · | 2.2 km | MPC · JPL |
| 352321 | 2007 UG_{109} | — | October 10, 2007 | Kitt Peak | Spacewatch | · | 1.9 km | MPC · JPL |
| 352322 | 2007 UQ_{113} | — | October 31, 2007 | Kitt Peak | Spacewatch | · | 1.5 km | MPC · JPL |
| 352323 | 2007 UB_{114} | — | October 31, 2007 | Kitt Peak | Spacewatch | · | 1.6 km | MPC · JPL |
| 352324 | 2007 UN_{116} | — | October 30, 2007 | Kitt Peak | Spacewatch | KON | 2.7 km | MPC · JPL |
| 352325 | 2007 US_{123} | — | October 31, 2007 | Catalina | CSS | · | 2.1 km | MPC · JPL |
| 352326 | 2007 UX_{126} | — | October 20, 2007 | Mount Lemmon | Mount Lemmon Survey | · | 2.0 km | MPC · JPL |
| 352327 | 2007 UB_{128} | — | October 16, 2007 | Mount Lemmon | Mount Lemmon Survey | · | 2.9 km | MPC · JPL |
| 352328 | 2007 UC_{129} | — | October 16, 2007 | Mount Lemmon | Mount Lemmon Survey | · | 1.8 km | MPC · JPL |
| 352329 | 2007 UW_{130} | — | October 20, 2007 | Mount Lemmon | Mount Lemmon Survey | · | 2.1 km | MPC · JPL |
| 352330 | 2007 UM_{136} | — | October 30, 2007 | Catalina | CSS | · | 1.5 km | MPC · JPL |
| 352331 | 2007 UY_{139} | — | October 30, 2007 | Kitt Peak | Spacewatch | fast | 3.0 km | MPC · JPL |
| 352332 | 2007 UB_{142} | — | October 24, 2007 | Mount Lemmon | Mount Lemmon Survey | KOR | 1.9 km | MPC · JPL |
| 352333 Sylvievauclair | 2007 VV | Sylvievauclair | November 1, 2007 | Marly | P. Kocher | · | 2.1 km | MPC · JPL |
| 352334 | 2007 VL_{7} | — | November 2, 2007 | Eskridge | G. Hug | · | 2.8 km | MPC · JPL |
| 352335 | 2007 VV_{12} | — | November 1, 2007 | Kitt Peak | Spacewatch | · | 2.2 km | MPC · JPL |
| 352336 | 2007 VC_{14} | — | November 1, 2007 | Mount Lemmon | Mount Lemmon Survey | · | 1.8 km | MPC · JPL |
| 352337 | 2007 VG_{28} | — | October 10, 2007 | Catalina | CSS | EUN | 1.4 km | MPC · JPL |
| 352338 | 2007 VS_{44} | — | November 1, 2007 | Kitt Peak | Spacewatch | · | 1.9 km | MPC · JPL |
| 352339 | 2007 VG_{47} | — | November 1, 2007 | Kitt Peak | Spacewatch | GEF | 1.1 km | MPC · JPL |
| 352340 | 2007 VA_{58} | — | November 1, 2007 | Kitt Peak | Spacewatch | · | 1.8 km | MPC · JPL |
| 352341 | 2007 VK_{66} | — | November 2, 2007 | Kitt Peak | Spacewatch | · | 2.0 km | MPC · JPL |
| 352342 | 2007 VA_{74} | — | November 3, 2007 | Kitt Peak | Spacewatch | · | 1.6 km | MPC · JPL |
| 352343 | 2007 VO_{75} | — | October 8, 2007 | Mount Lemmon | Mount Lemmon Survey | · | 1.4 km | MPC · JPL |
| 352344 | 2007 VL_{85} | — | November 2, 2007 | Socorro | LINEAR | · | 1.6 km | MPC · JPL |
| 352345 | 2007 VA_{86} | — | November 2, 2007 | Socorro | LINEAR | (5) | 1.4 km | MPC · JPL |
| 352346 | 2007 VX_{100} | — | November 2, 2007 | Kitt Peak | Spacewatch | · | 2.0 km | MPC · JPL |
| 352347 | 2007 VW_{105} | — | November 3, 2007 | Kitt Peak | Spacewatch | · | 1.9 km | MPC · JPL |
| 352348 | 2007 VB_{108} | — | November 3, 2007 | Kitt Peak | Spacewatch | · | 1.8 km | MPC · JPL |
| 352349 | 2007 VG_{110} | — | November 3, 2007 | Kitt Peak | Spacewatch | KOR | 1.3 km | MPC · JPL |
| 352350 | 2007 VT_{124} | — | November 5, 2007 | Mount Lemmon | Mount Lemmon Survey | · | 2.7 km | MPC · JPL |
| 352351 | 2007 VQ_{133} | — | November 2, 2007 | Catalina | CSS | · | 1.9 km | MPC · JPL |
| 352352 | 2007 VN_{136} | — | October 12, 2007 | Kitt Peak | Spacewatch | · | 1.0 km | MPC · JPL |
| 352353 | 2007 VW_{166} | — | November 5, 2007 | Mount Lemmon | Mount Lemmon Survey | · | 2.1 km | MPC · JPL |
| 352354 | 2007 VY_{167} | — | November 5, 2007 | Kitt Peak | Spacewatch | · | 1.9 km | MPC · JPL |
| 352355 | 2007 VX_{170} | — | November 7, 2007 | Kitt Peak | Spacewatch | · | 2.1 km | MPC · JPL |
| 352356 | 2007 VB_{183} | — | November 8, 2007 | Catalina | CSS | · | 2.1 km | MPC · JPL |
| 352357 | 2007 VA_{185} | — | November 11, 2007 | Bisei SG Center | BATTeRS | · | 2.2 km | MPC · JPL |
| 352358 | 2007 VO_{190} | — | November 5, 2007 | Kitt Peak | Spacewatch | · | 1.9 km | MPC · JPL |
| 352359 | 2007 VP_{190} | — | November 5, 2007 | Kitt Peak | Spacewatch | · | 2.0 km | MPC · JPL |
| 352360 | 2007 VX_{203} | — | November 9, 2007 | Kitt Peak | Spacewatch | · | 2.2 km | MPC · JPL |
| 352361 | 2007 VD_{205} | — | November 9, 2007 | Mount Lemmon | Mount Lemmon Survey | · | 1.4 km | MPC · JPL |
| 352362 | 2007 VJ_{206} | — | November 9, 2007 | Mount Lemmon | Mount Lemmon Survey | AGN | 1.2 km | MPC · JPL |
| 352363 | 2007 VH_{210} | — | November 9, 2007 | Kitt Peak | Spacewatch | · | 1.2 km | MPC · JPL |
| 352364 | 2007 VN_{214} | — | November 9, 2007 | Kitt Peak | Spacewatch | · | 860 m | MPC · JPL |
| 352365 | 2007 VB_{216} | — | November 9, 2007 | Kitt Peak | Spacewatch | · | 2.0 km | MPC · JPL |
| 352366 | 2007 VO_{216} | — | November 9, 2007 | Kitt Peak | Spacewatch | · | 1.8 km | MPC · JPL |
| 352367 | 2007 VS_{233} | — | November 8, 2007 | Kitt Peak | Spacewatch | · | 1.9 km | MPC · JPL |
| 352368 | 2007 VR_{242} | — | November 12, 2007 | Catalina | CSS | EUN | 1.4 km | MPC · JPL |
| 352369 | 2007 VH_{243} | — | November 13, 2007 | Mount Lemmon | Mount Lemmon Survey | · | 2.9 km | MPC · JPL |
| 352370 | 2007 VG_{244} | — | November 15, 2007 | La Sagra | OAM | · | 1.8 km | MPC · JPL |
| 352371 | 2007 VL_{254} | — | November 15, 2007 | Catalina | CSS | · | 2.4 km | MPC · JPL |
| 352372 | 2007 VA_{255} | — | November 11, 2007 | Mount Lemmon | Mount Lemmon Survey | · | 1.2 km | MPC · JPL |
| 352373 | 2007 VG_{260} | — | November 15, 2007 | Anderson Mesa | LONEOS | HNS | 1.7 km | MPC · JPL |
| 352374 | 2007 VM_{263} | — | November 13, 2007 | Kitt Peak | Spacewatch | · | 2.1 km | MPC · JPL |
| 352375 | 2007 VM_{269} | — | November 14, 2007 | Socorro | LINEAR | · | 2.1 km | MPC · JPL |
| 352376 | 2007 VF_{278} | — | November 14, 2007 | Kitt Peak | Spacewatch | · | 1.5 km | MPC · JPL |
| 352377 | 2007 VL_{286} | — | November 14, 2007 | Kitt Peak | Spacewatch | · | 2.8 km | MPC · JPL |
| 352378 | 2007 VW_{294} | — | November 14, 2007 | Kitt Peak | Spacewatch | · | 3.9 km | MPC · JPL |
| 352379 | 2007 VD_{298} | — | November 11, 2007 | Catalina | CSS | · | 2.1 km | MPC · JPL |
| 352380 | 2007 VE_{299} | — | November 11, 2007 | Anderson Mesa | LONEOS | · | 2.3 km | MPC · JPL |
| 352381 | 2007 VF_{304} | — | November 7, 2007 | Catalina | CSS | · | 2.6 km | MPC · JPL |
| 352382 | 2007 VU_{309} | — | November 3, 2007 | Mount Lemmon | Mount Lemmon Survey | · | 2.5 km | MPC · JPL |
| 352383 | 2007 VN_{318} | — | November 7, 2007 | Kitt Peak | Spacewatch | · | 1.7 km | MPC · JPL |
| 352384 | 2007 VZ_{323} | — | November 5, 2007 | Socorro | LINEAR | WIT | 1.2 km | MPC · JPL |
| 352385 | 2007 VD_{328} | — | November 8, 2007 | Socorro | LINEAR | · | 2.3 km | MPC · JPL |
| 352386 | 2007 VO_{331} | — | November 6, 2007 | Kitt Peak | Spacewatch | · | 1.9 km | MPC · JPL |
| 352387 | 2007 VP_{331} | — | November 7, 2007 | Kitt Peak | Spacewatch | KOR | 1.7 km | MPC · JPL |
| 352388 | 2007 WB_{6} | — | November 17, 2007 | Socorro | LINEAR | · | 2.5 km | MPC · JPL |
| 352389 | 2007 WP_{8} | — | November 8, 2007 | Kitt Peak | Spacewatch | · | 4.0 km | MPC · JPL |
| 352390 | 2007 WK_{11} | — | October 17, 2007 | Mount Lemmon | Mount Lemmon Survey | · | 1.9 km | MPC · JPL |
| 352391 | 2007 WG_{15} | — | November 18, 2007 | Mount Lemmon | Mount Lemmon Survey | · | 2.8 km | MPC · JPL |
| 352392 | 2007 WM_{22} | — | November 17, 2007 | Kitt Peak | Spacewatch | MRX | 920 m | MPC · JPL |
| 352393 | 2007 WV_{36} | — | January 19, 2004 | Kitt Peak | Spacewatch | · | 1.7 km | MPC · JPL |
| 352394 | 2007 WQ_{38} | — | November 19, 2007 | Mount Lemmon | Mount Lemmon Survey | · | 1.9 km | MPC · JPL |
| 352395 | 2007 WM_{51} | — | November 20, 2007 | Mount Lemmon | Mount Lemmon Survey | · | 1.9 km | MPC · JPL |
| 352396 | 2007 WG_{56} | — | November 29, 2007 | Eskridge | G. Hug | · | 2.7 km | MPC · JPL |
| 352397 | 2007 WS_{62} | — | November 18, 2007 | Mount Lemmon | Mount Lemmon Survey | · | 3.2 km | MPC · JPL |
| 352398 | 2007 WA_{63} | — | November 19, 2007 | Mount Lemmon | Mount Lemmon Survey | · | 2.9 km | MPC · JPL |
| 352399 | 2007 XY_{1} | — | November 9, 2007 | Kitt Peak | Spacewatch | · | 2.4 km | MPC · JPL |
| 352400 | 2007 XM_{5} | — | December 4, 2007 | Kitt Peak | Spacewatch | AEO | 1.2 km | MPC · JPL |

== 352401–352500 ==
back to top

| Designation | | | Discovery | | | Properties | | Ref |
| Permanent | Provisional | Named after | Date | Site | Discoverer(s) | Category | Diam. | Ref |
|---|---|---|---|---|---|---|---|---|
| 352401 | 2007 XS_{9} | — | December 5, 2007 | La Sagra | OAM | · | 2.3 km | MPC · JPL |
| 352402 | 2007 XS_{14} | — | December 5, 2007 | Mount Lemmon | Mount Lemmon Survey | AGN | 1.5 km | MPC · JPL |
| 352403 | 2007 XU_{14} | — | December 5, 2007 | Mount Lemmon | Mount Lemmon Survey | · | 1.8 km | MPC · JPL |
| 352404 | 2007 XC_{19} | — | December 12, 2007 | Socorro | LINEAR | · | 1.9 km | MPC · JPL |
| 352405 | 2007 XJ_{26} | — | December 14, 2007 | Kitt Peak | Spacewatch | · | 2.7 km | MPC · JPL |
| 352406 | 2007 XG_{30} | — | December 15, 2007 | Catalina | CSS | · | 2.4 km | MPC · JPL |
| 352407 | 2007 XC_{40} | — | December 13, 2007 | Socorro | LINEAR | · | 8.8 km | MPC · JPL |
| 352408 | 2007 XG_{41} | — | December 14, 2007 | Socorro | LINEAR | EOS | 2.4 km | MPC · JPL |
| 352409 | 2007 XH_{41} | — | December 14, 2007 | Socorro | LINEAR | · | 3.8 km | MPC · JPL |
| 352410 | 2007 XJ_{42} | — | December 14, 2007 | Mount Lemmon | Mount Lemmon Survey | · | 3.6 km | MPC · JPL |
| 352411 | 2007 XF_{52} | — | December 6, 2007 | Kitt Peak | Spacewatch | AGN | 1.4 km | MPC · JPL |
| 352412 | 2007 XX_{52} | — | December 15, 2007 | Mount Lemmon | Mount Lemmon Survey | · | 3.9 km | MPC · JPL |
| 352413 | 2007 XZ_{52} | — | December 4, 2007 | Catalina | CSS | · | 3.1 km | MPC · JPL |
| 352414 | 2007 XF_{53} | — | December 5, 2007 | Mount Lemmon | Mount Lemmon Survey | · | 2.1 km | MPC · JPL |
| 352415 | 2007 XX_{53} | — | December 14, 2007 | Charleston | Astronomical Research Observatory | · | 2.7 km | MPC · JPL |
| 352416 | 2007 XJ_{56} | — | August 16, 2001 | Palomar | NEAT | · | 2.6 km | MPC · JPL |
| 352417 | 2007 XA_{58} | — | December 5, 2007 | Kitt Peak | Spacewatch | · | 2.1 km | MPC · JPL |
| 352418 | 2007 YN_{13} | — | December 17, 2007 | Mount Lemmon | Mount Lemmon Survey | · | 2.2 km | MPC · JPL |
| 352419 | 2007 YR_{17} | — | December 5, 2007 | Kitt Peak | Spacewatch | PAD | 1.8 km | MPC · JPL |
| 352420 | 2007 YO_{20} | — | December 16, 2007 | Kitt Peak | Spacewatch | · | 4.4 km | MPC · JPL |
| 352421 | 2007 YM_{22} | — | December 16, 2007 | Kitt Peak | Spacewatch | · | 6.5 km | MPC · JPL |
| 352422 | 2007 YZ_{35} | — | December 30, 2007 | Mount Lemmon | Mount Lemmon Survey | AGN | 1.2 km | MPC · JPL |
| 352423 | 2007 YJ_{43} | — | December 30, 2007 | Kitt Peak | Spacewatch | THM | 2.6 km | MPC · JPL |
| 352424 | 2007 YV_{45} | — | December 30, 2007 | Mount Lemmon | Mount Lemmon Survey | EOS | 2.4 km | MPC · JPL |
| 352425 | 2007 YY_{48} | — | December 28, 2007 | Kitt Peak | Spacewatch | EOS | 2.4 km | MPC · JPL |
| 352426 | 2007 YF_{64} | — | December 31, 2007 | Kitt Peak | Spacewatch | · | 4.1 km | MPC · JPL |
| 352427 | 2007 YL_{66} | — | June 1, 2005 | Kitt Peak | Spacewatch | · | 1.6 km | MPC · JPL |
| 352428 | 2007 YW_{72} | — | December 19, 2007 | Catalina | CSS | · | 3.2 km | MPC · JPL |
| 352429 | 2007 YC_{73} | — | December 20, 2007 | Mount Lemmon | Mount Lemmon Survey | · | 2.1 km | MPC · JPL |
| 352430 | 2007 YB_{74} | — | December 31, 2007 | Catalina | CSS | · | 2.1 km | MPC · JPL |
| 352431 | 2008 AY_{4} | — | January 7, 2008 | Lulin | LUSS | · | 3.5 km | MPC · JPL |
| 352432 | 2008 AY_{12} | — | January 10, 2008 | Mount Lemmon | Mount Lemmon Survey | · | 3.5 km | MPC · JPL |
| 352433 | 2008 AV_{13} | — | January 10, 2008 | Mount Lemmon | Mount Lemmon Survey | EOS | 2.2 km | MPC · JPL |
| 352434 | 2008 AZ_{16} | — | January 10, 2008 | Kitt Peak | Spacewatch | · | 2.1 km | MPC · JPL |
| 352435 | 2008 AO_{20} | — | January 10, 2008 | Mount Lemmon | Mount Lemmon Survey | · | 3.1 km | MPC · JPL |
| 352436 | 2008 AK_{21} | — | January 10, 2008 | Mount Lemmon | Mount Lemmon Survey | · | 2.2 km | MPC · JPL |
| 352437 | 2008 AS_{23} | — | January 10, 2008 | Mount Lemmon | Mount Lemmon Survey | · | 2.0 km | MPC · JPL |
| 352438 | 2008 AB_{25} | — | January 10, 2008 | Mount Lemmon | Mount Lemmon Survey | · | 1.7 km | MPC · JPL |
| 352439 | 2008 AN_{27} | — | January 10, 2008 | Mount Lemmon | Mount Lemmon Survey | · | 3.6 km | MPC · JPL |
| 352440 | 2008 AR_{28} | — | January 11, 2008 | Catalina | CSS | H | 520 m | MPC · JPL |
| 352441 | 2008 AP_{34} | — | January 10, 2008 | Kitt Peak | Spacewatch | EOS | 2.3 km | MPC · JPL |
| 352442 | 2008 AM_{35} | — | January 10, 2008 | Kitt Peak | Spacewatch | · | 1.8 km | MPC · JPL |
| 352443 | 2008 AD_{36} | — | January 10, 2008 | Kitt Peak | Spacewatch | · | 1.9 km | MPC · JPL |
| 352444 | 2008 AR_{40} | — | January 10, 2008 | Mount Lemmon | Mount Lemmon Survey | · | 4.8 km | MPC · JPL |
| 352445 | 2008 AY_{41} | — | January 10, 2008 | Mount Lemmon | Mount Lemmon Survey | · | 2.9 km | MPC · JPL |
| 352446 | 2008 AF_{43} | — | January 10, 2008 | Catalina | CSS | EOS | 2.8 km | MPC · JPL |
| 352447 | 2008 AB_{45} | — | January 10, 2008 | Catalina | CSS | · | 4.1 km | MPC · JPL |
| 352448 | 2008 AU_{49} | — | January 11, 2008 | Kitt Peak | Spacewatch | · | 3.4 km | MPC · JPL |
| 352449 | 2008 AM_{54} | — | January 11, 2008 | Kitt Peak | Spacewatch | TRE | 3.0 km | MPC · JPL |
| 352450 | 2008 AE_{59} | — | January 11, 2008 | Kitt Peak | Spacewatch | · | 3.3 km | MPC · JPL |
| 352451 | 2008 AU_{65} | — | January 11, 2008 | Kitt Peak | Spacewatch | · | 2.0 km | MPC · JPL |
| 352452 | 2008 AF_{68} | — | January 11, 2008 | Kitt Peak | Spacewatch | · | 2.1 km | MPC · JPL |
| 352453 | 2008 AN_{69} | — | January 11, 2008 | Kitt Peak | Spacewatch | · | 2.6 km | MPC · JPL |
| 352454 | 2008 AO_{73} | — | January 10, 2008 | Kitt Peak | Spacewatch | · | 3.3 km | MPC · JPL |
| 352455 | 2008 AW_{75} | — | January 11, 2008 | Kitt Peak | Spacewatch | EOS | 2.0 km | MPC · JPL |
| 352456 | 2008 AQ_{78} | — | January 12, 2008 | Kitt Peak | Spacewatch | · | 1.9 km | MPC · JPL |
| 352457 | 2008 AB_{84} | — | January 15, 2008 | Kitt Peak | Spacewatch | · | 1.8 km | MPC · JPL |
| 352458 | 2008 AU_{84} | — | January 5, 2008 | Mount Nyukasa | Japan Aerospace Exploration Agency | EOS | 2.2 km | MPC · JPL |
| 352459 | 2008 AQ_{85} | — | January 13, 2008 | Kitt Peak | Spacewatch | · | 2.5 km | MPC · JPL |
| 352460 | 2008 AA_{86} | — | September 28, 2006 | Catalina | CSS | · | 2.2 km | MPC · JPL |
| 352461 | 2008 AW_{94} | — | January 14, 2008 | Kitt Peak | Spacewatch | · | 3.6 km | MPC · JPL |
| 352462 | 2008 AN_{100} | — | January 14, 2008 | Kitt Peak | Spacewatch | EOS | 1.9 km | MPC · JPL |
| 352463 | 2008 AA_{102} | — | September 19, 2006 | Catalina | CSS | · | 2.6 km | MPC · JPL |
| 352464 | 2008 AS_{106} | — | January 15, 2008 | Kitt Peak | Spacewatch | · | 3.3 km | MPC · JPL |
| 352465 | 2008 AO_{108} | — | January 15, 2008 | Kitt Peak | Spacewatch | · | 3.0 km | MPC · JPL |
| 352466 | 2008 AL_{111} | — | January 15, 2008 | Kitt Peak | Spacewatch | · | 2.8 km | MPC · JPL |
| 352467 | 2008 AC_{115} | — | January 12, 2008 | Kitt Peak | Spacewatch | EOS | 1.8 km | MPC · JPL |
| 352468 | 2008 AC_{117} | — | January 1, 2008 | Kitt Peak | Spacewatch | TIR | 4.1 km | MPC · JPL |
| 352469 | 2008 AU_{126} | — | January 10, 2008 | Mount Lemmon | Mount Lemmon Survey | · | 2.5 km | MPC · JPL |
| 352470 | 2008 AJ_{130} | — | September 30, 2006 | Catalina | CSS | KOR | 1.6 km | MPC · JPL |
| 352471 | 2008 AY_{136} | — | October 15, 2006 | Kitt Peak | Spacewatch | · | 3.0 km | MPC · JPL |
| 352472 | 2008 BN | — | January 16, 2008 | Mount Lemmon | Mount Lemmon Survey | EOS | 2.1 km | MPC · JPL |
| 352473 | 2008 BD_{2} | — | January 17, 2008 | Kitt Peak | Spacewatch | · | 3.6 km | MPC · JPL |
| 352474 | 2008 BZ_{2} | — | January 21, 2008 | Mount Lemmon | Mount Lemmon Survey | · | 4.0 km | MPC · JPL |
| 352475 | 2008 BD_{4} | — | January 16, 2008 | Kitt Peak | Spacewatch | · | 2.2 km | MPC · JPL |
| 352476 | 2008 BJ_{5} | — | January 16, 2008 | Kitt Peak | Spacewatch | · | 3.6 km | MPC · JPL |
| 352477 | 2008 BL_{16} | — | January 29, 2008 | La Sagra | OAM | H | 720 m | MPC · JPL |
| 352478 | 2008 BV_{19} | — | January 30, 2008 | Kitt Peak | Spacewatch | KOR | 1.8 km | MPC · JPL |
| 352479 | 2008 BO_{31} | — | January 30, 2008 | Mount Lemmon | Mount Lemmon Survey | · | 1.8 km | MPC · JPL |
| 352480 | 2008 BH_{32} | — | January 30, 2008 | Mount Lemmon | Mount Lemmon Survey | THM | 2.7 km | MPC · JPL |
| 352481 | 2008 BN_{33} | — | January 30, 2008 | Kitt Peak | Spacewatch | · | 4.2 km | MPC · JPL |
| 352482 | 2008 BG_{40} | — | January 30, 2008 | Socorro | LINEAR | · | 2.5 km | MPC · JPL |
| 352483 | 2008 BR_{41} | — | January 30, 2008 | Catalina | CSS | · | 6.4 km | MPC · JPL |
| 352484 | 2008 BD_{48} | — | January 16, 2008 | Kitt Peak | Spacewatch | EOS | 1.5 km | MPC · JPL |
| 352485 | 2008 BD_{49} | — | January 30, 2008 | Mount Lemmon | Mount Lemmon Survey | · | 3.4 km | MPC · JPL |
| 352486 | 2008 BW_{49} | — | January 30, 2008 | Mount Lemmon | Mount Lemmon Survey | KOR | 1.3 km | MPC · JPL |
| 352487 | 2008 BZ_{50} | — | January 30, 2008 | Mount Lemmon | Mount Lemmon Survey | · | 3.1 km | MPC · JPL |
| 352488 | 2008 BS_{53} | — | January 30, 2008 | Kitt Peak | Spacewatch | · | 2.8 km | MPC · JPL |
| 352489 | 2008 CF_{4} | — | February 2, 2008 | Kitt Peak | Spacewatch | · | 3.8 km | MPC · JPL |
| 352490 | 2008 CO_{4} | — | February 2, 2008 | Mount Lemmon | Mount Lemmon Survey | · | 2.2 km | MPC · JPL |
| 352491 | 2008 CS_{4} | — | February 2, 2008 | Mount Lemmon | Mount Lemmon Survey | H | 650 m | MPC · JPL |
| 352492 | 2008 CL_{5} | — | February 5, 2008 | La Sagra | OAM | · | 3.0 km | MPC · JPL |
| 352493 | 2008 CG_{8} | — | February 2, 2008 | Kitt Peak | Spacewatch | EOS | 1.9 km | MPC · JPL |
| 352494 | 2008 CL_{10} | — | February 2, 2008 | Kitt Peak | Spacewatch | · | 3.1 km | MPC · JPL |
| 352495 | 2008 CV_{10} | — | February 3, 2008 | Catalina | CSS | H | 490 m | MPC · JPL |
| 352496 | 2008 CF_{14} | — | February 3, 2008 | Kitt Peak | Spacewatch | · | 2.4 km | MPC · JPL |
| 352497 | 2008 CM_{15} | — | February 3, 2008 | Kitt Peak | Spacewatch | · | 2.7 km | MPC · JPL |
| 352498 | 2008 CL_{16} | — | February 3, 2008 | Kitt Peak | Spacewatch | · | 2.3 km | MPC · JPL |
| 352499 | 2008 CK_{28} | — | February 2, 2008 | Kitt Peak | Spacewatch | · | 5.2 km | MPC · JPL |
| 352500 | 2008 CP_{29} | — | February 2, 2008 | Kitt Peak | Spacewatch | EOS | 2.8 km | MPC · JPL |

== 352501–352600 ==
back to top

| Designation | | | Discovery | | | Properties | | Ref |
| Permanent | Provisional | Named after | Date | Site | Discoverer(s) | Category | Diam. | Ref |
|---|---|---|---|---|---|---|---|---|
| 352501 | 2008 CC_{37} | — | February 2, 2008 | Kitt Peak | Spacewatch | · | 4.0 km | MPC · JPL |
| 352502 | 2008 CQ_{37} | — | February 2, 2008 | Kitt Peak | Spacewatch | · | 3.4 km | MPC · JPL |
| 352503 | 2008 CL_{52} | — | February 7, 2008 | Kitt Peak | Spacewatch | · | 2.2 km | MPC · JPL |
| 352504 | 2008 CX_{62} | — | February 8, 2008 | Mount Lemmon | Mount Lemmon Survey | KOR | 1.4 km | MPC · JPL |
| 352505 | 2008 CA_{69} | — | February 7, 2008 | Pla D'Arguines | R. Ferrando | · | 2.9 km | MPC · JPL |
| 352506 | 2008 CF_{74} | — | February 9, 2008 | Catalina | CSS | · | 2.5 km | MPC · JPL |
| 352507 | 2008 CO_{74} | — | February 9, 2008 | Dauban | F. Kugel, C. Rinner | · | 3.5 km | MPC · JPL |
| 352508 | 2008 CY_{74} | — | February 10, 2008 | Bergisch Gladbach | W. Bickel | · | 1.4 km | MPC · JPL |
| 352509 | 2008 CP_{75} | — | February 10, 2008 | La Sagra | OAM | · | 3.7 km | MPC · JPL |
| 352510 | 2008 CZ_{81} | — | October 22, 2006 | Catalina | CSS | · | 1.9 km | MPC · JPL |
| 352511 | 2008 CN_{83} | — | February 3, 2008 | Kitt Peak | Spacewatch | EOS | 2.7 km | MPC · JPL |
| 352512 | 2008 CJ_{87} | — | February 7, 2008 | Mount Lemmon | Mount Lemmon Survey | H | 590 m | MPC · JPL |
| 352513 | 2008 CM_{89} | — | February 7, 2008 | Kitt Peak | Spacewatch | EOS | 2.3 km | MPC · JPL |
| 352514 | 2008 CL_{95} | — | February 8, 2008 | Mount Lemmon | Mount Lemmon Survey | · | 2.6 km | MPC · JPL |
| 352515 | 2008 CP_{98} | — | February 9, 2008 | Kitt Peak | Spacewatch | · | 2.0 km | MPC · JPL |
| 352516 | 2008 CO_{99} | — | February 9, 2008 | Kitt Peak | Spacewatch | · | 2.2 km | MPC · JPL |
| 352517 | 2008 CJ_{110} | — | February 9, 2008 | Purple Mountain | PMO NEO Survey Program | · | 2.6 km | MPC · JPL |
| 352518 | 2008 CN_{113} | — | February 10, 2008 | Kitt Peak | Spacewatch | · | 2.8 km | MPC · JPL |
| 352519 | 2008 CU_{117} | — | February 11, 2008 | Dauban | Kugel, F. | · | 4.4 km | MPC · JPL |
| 352520 | 2008 CC_{118} | — | February 12, 2008 | Wildberg | R. Apitzsch | · | 3.3 km | MPC · JPL |
| 352521 | 2008 CX_{120} | — | February 6, 2008 | Catalina | CSS | · | 3.6 km | MPC · JPL |
| 352522 | 2008 CP_{127} | — | February 8, 2008 | Kitt Peak | Spacewatch | · | 2.1 km | MPC · JPL |
| 352523 | 2008 CO_{130} | — | February 8, 2008 | Kitt Peak | Spacewatch | · | 4.2 km | MPC · JPL |
| 352524 | 2008 CK_{134} | — | January 15, 2008 | Mount Lemmon | Mount Lemmon Survey | · | 4.5 km | MPC · JPL |
| 352525 | 2008 CR_{137} | — | February 8, 2008 | Kitt Peak | Spacewatch | · | 2.7 km | MPC · JPL |
| 352526 | 2008 CF_{141} | — | February 1, 2008 | Kitt Peak | Spacewatch | · | 2.6 km | MPC · JPL |
| 352527 | 2008 CT_{144} | — | February 9, 2008 | Kitt Peak | Spacewatch | · | 3.1 km | MPC · JPL |
| 352528 | 2008 CO_{148} | — | February 9, 2008 | Mount Lemmon | Mount Lemmon Survey | · | 4.4 km | MPC · JPL |
| 352529 | 2008 CK_{149} | — | February 9, 2008 | Kitt Peak | Spacewatch | · | 3.4 km | MPC · JPL |
| 352530 | 2008 CW_{150} | — | February 9, 2008 | Kitt Peak | Spacewatch | · | 3.1 km | MPC · JPL |
| 352531 | 2008 CF_{155} | — | February 9, 2008 | Mount Lemmon | Mount Lemmon Survey | LIX | 3.6 km | MPC · JPL |
| 352532 | 2008 CD_{156} | — | February 9, 2008 | Mount Lemmon | Mount Lemmon Survey | · | 2.8 km | MPC · JPL |
| 352533 | 2008 CX_{164} | — | February 10, 2008 | Mount Lemmon | Mount Lemmon Survey | · | 1.4 km | MPC · JPL |
| 352534 | 2008 CP_{176} | — | February 7, 2008 | Socorro | LINEAR | H | 690 m | MPC · JPL |
| 352535 | 2008 CD_{178} | — | October 11, 2007 | Mount Lemmon | Mount Lemmon Survey | · | 6.5 km | MPC · JPL |
| 352536 | 2008 CT_{178} | — | February 6, 2008 | Anderson Mesa | LONEOS | · | 3.2 km | MPC · JPL |
| 352537 | 2008 CG_{179} | — | October 14, 2007 | Mount Lemmon | Mount Lemmon Survey | · | 2.2 km | MPC · JPL |
| 352538 | 2008 CN_{179} | — | February 6, 2008 | Purple Mountain | PMO NEO Survey Program | · | 5.8 km | MPC · JPL |
| 352539 | 2008 CM_{180} | — | February 9, 2008 | Catalina | CSS | H | 680 m | MPC · JPL |
| 352540 | 2008 CQ_{180} | — | February 9, 2008 | Catalina | CSS | H | 650 m | MPC · JPL |
| 352541 | 2008 CW_{185} | — | December 18, 2007 | Mount Lemmon | Mount Lemmon Survey | · | 3.7 km | MPC · JPL |
| 352542 | 2008 CY_{190} | — | February 1, 2008 | Kitt Peak | Spacewatch | H | 620 m | MPC · JPL |
| 352543 | 2008 CZ_{190} | — | February 2, 2008 | Kitt Peak | Spacewatch | · | 4.5 km | MPC · JPL |
| 352544 | 2008 CX_{192} | — | February 7, 2008 | Mount Lemmon | Mount Lemmon Survey | VER | 3.1 km | MPC · JPL |
| 352545 | 2008 CD_{193} | — | February 8, 2008 | Kitt Peak | Spacewatch | · | 1.5 km | MPC · JPL |
| 352546 | 2008 CZ_{199} | — | February 7, 2008 | Mount Lemmon | Mount Lemmon Survey | · | 2.7 km | MPC · JPL |
| 352547 | 2008 CG_{200} | — | February 10, 2008 | Mount Lemmon | Mount Lemmon Survey | · | 3.7 km | MPC · JPL |
| 352548 | 2008 CD_{201} | — | February 13, 2008 | Kitt Peak | Spacewatch | · | 3.3 km | MPC · JPL |
| 352549 | 2008 CF_{202} | — | February 3, 2008 | Kitt Peak | Spacewatch | · | 3.8 km | MPC · JPL |
| 352550 | 2008 CF_{205} | — | February 13, 2008 | Kitt Peak | Spacewatch | (1118) | 4.9 km | MPC · JPL |
| 352551 | 2008 CB_{207} | — | February 12, 2008 | Kitt Peak | Spacewatch | · | 2.8 km | MPC · JPL |
| 352552 | 2008 CQ_{209} | — | February 6, 2008 | Catalina | CSS | · | 4.6 km | MPC · JPL |
| 352553 | 2008 CY_{210} | — | February 2, 2008 | Kitt Peak | Spacewatch | · | 2.5 km | MPC · JPL |
| 352554 | 2008 CT_{211} | — | February 6, 2008 | Catalina | CSS | EOS | 2.3 km | MPC · JPL |
| 352555 | 2008 CR_{212} | — | February 8, 2008 | Mount Lemmon | Mount Lemmon Survey | · | 3.0 km | MPC · JPL |
| 352556 | 2008 CZ_{212} | — | February 9, 2008 | Kitt Peak | Spacewatch | · | 2.6 km | MPC · JPL |
| 352557 | 2008 CA_{213} | — | February 9, 2008 | Kitt Peak | Spacewatch | TIR | 2.7 km | MPC · JPL |
| 352558 | 2008 CK_{213} | — | February 9, 2008 | Mount Lemmon | Mount Lemmon Survey | HYG | 3.0 km | MPC · JPL |
| 352559 | 2008 CB_{214} | — | February 10, 2008 | Kitt Peak | Spacewatch | THM | 2.6 km | MPC · JPL |
| 352560 | 2008 CH_{214} | — | February 11, 2008 | Mount Lemmon | Mount Lemmon Survey | EOS | 2.3 km | MPC · JPL |
| 352561 | 2008 CW_{214} | — | February 12, 2008 | Mount Lemmon | Mount Lemmon Survey | · | 4.2 km | MPC · JPL |
| 352562 | 2008 DG_{1} | — | February 24, 2008 | Kitt Peak | Spacewatch | · | 1.7 km | MPC · JPL |
| 352563 | 2008 DC_{3} | — | February 24, 2008 | Mount Lemmon | Mount Lemmon Survey | · | 1.6 km | MPC · JPL |
| 352564 | 2008 DW_{8} | — | February 25, 2008 | Mount Lemmon | Mount Lemmon Survey | H | 540 m | MPC · JPL |
| 352565 | 2008 DN_{10} | — | February 26, 2008 | Kitt Peak | Spacewatch | · | 2.7 km | MPC · JPL |
| 352566 | 2008 DK_{12} | — | February 26, 2008 | Kitt Peak | Spacewatch | · | 3.1 km | MPC · JPL |
| 352567 | 2008 DW_{13} | — | February 26, 2008 | Mount Lemmon | Mount Lemmon Survey | · | 2.4 km | MPC · JPL |
| 352568 | 2008 DS_{18} | — | February 26, 2008 | Kitt Peak | Spacewatch | H | 640 m | MPC · JPL |
| 352569 | 2008 DT_{18} | — | December 30, 2007 | Mount Lemmon | Mount Lemmon Survey | · | 3.0 km | MPC · JPL |
| 352570 | 2008 DZ_{19} | — | February 28, 2008 | Mount Lemmon | Mount Lemmon Survey | BRA | 1.4 km | MPC · JPL |
| 352571 | 2008 DJ_{22} | — | February 28, 2008 | Catalina | CSS | · | 3.8 km | MPC · JPL |
| 352572 | 2008 DO_{22} | — | February 10, 2008 | Catalina | CSS | PHO | 1.2 km | MPC · JPL |
| 352573 | 2008 DS_{23} | — | February 24, 2008 | Kitt Peak | Spacewatch | · | 3.8 km | MPC · JPL |
| 352574 | 2008 DT_{24} | — | February 28, 2008 | Mount Lemmon | Mount Lemmon Survey | · | 3.6 km | MPC · JPL |
| 352575 | 2008 DF_{54} | — | February 27, 2008 | Anderson Mesa | LONEOS | H | 730 m | MPC · JPL |
| 352576 | 2008 DA_{55} | — | February 29, 2008 | Catalina | CSS | · | 2.4 km | MPC · JPL |
| 352577 | 2008 DD_{55} | — | February 26, 2008 | Kitt Peak | Spacewatch | · | 3.2 km | MPC · JPL |
| 352578 | 2008 DN_{55} | — | February 26, 2008 | Mount Lemmon | Mount Lemmon Survey | · | 2.8 km | MPC · JPL |
| 352579 | 2008 DD_{59} | — | February 27, 2008 | Kitt Peak | Spacewatch | EOS | 1.7 km | MPC · JPL |
| 352580 | 2008 DJ_{60} | — | February 28, 2008 | Kitt Peak | Spacewatch | HYG | 3.2 km | MPC · JPL |
| 352581 | 2008 DC_{70} | — | February 28, 2008 | Catalina | CSS | · | 4.1 km | MPC · JPL |
| 352582 | 2008 DG_{70} | — | February 18, 2008 | Catalina | CSS | H | 740 m | MPC · JPL |
| 352583 | 2008 DA_{72} | — | February 26, 2008 | Kitt Peak | Spacewatch | · | 3.5 km | MPC · JPL |
| 352584 | 2008 DF_{87} | — | February 28, 2008 | Mount Lemmon | Mount Lemmon Survey | · | 2.3 km | MPC · JPL |
| 352585 | 2008 EJ_{8} | — | March 3, 2008 | La Sagra | OAM | · | 3.4 km | MPC · JPL |
| 352586 | 2008 EZ_{10} | — | April 27, 2003 | Anderson Mesa | LONEOS | · | 3.5 km | MPC · JPL |
| 352587 | 2008 ER_{11} | — | March 1, 2008 | Kitt Peak | Spacewatch | · | 3.0 km | MPC · JPL |
| 352588 | 2008 ED_{20} | — | March 2, 2008 | Kitt Peak | Spacewatch | URS | 3.5 km | MPC · JPL |
| 352589 | 2008 EG_{21} | — | March 2, 2008 | Kitt Peak | Spacewatch | · | 2.8 km | MPC · JPL |
| 352590 | 2008 ES_{22} | — | March 3, 2008 | Catalina | CSS | · | 4.0 km | MPC · JPL |
| 352591 | 2008 ED_{24} | — | February 18, 2008 | Mount Lemmon | Mount Lemmon Survey | · | 3.4 km | MPC · JPL |
| 352592 | 2008 EL_{27} | — | February 22, 2002 | Palomar | NEAT | · | 3.8 km | MPC · JPL |
| 352593 | 2008 ET_{28} | — | March 4, 2008 | Mount Lemmon | Mount Lemmon Survey | THM | 2.8 km | MPC · JPL |
| 352594 | 2008 EA_{41} | — | March 4, 2008 | Catalina | CSS | · | 2.6 km | MPC · JPL |
| 352595 | 2008 EP_{42} | — | March 4, 2008 | Mount Lemmon | Mount Lemmon Survey | · | 2.9 km | MPC · JPL |
| 352596 | 2008 EW_{48} | — | March 6, 2008 | Kitt Peak | Spacewatch | · | 1.8 km | MPC · JPL |
| 352597 | 2008 ET_{49} | — | March 6, 2008 | Kitt Peak | Spacewatch | · | 3.2 km | MPC · JPL |
| 352598 | 2008 ER_{52} | — | March 6, 2008 | Kitt Peak | Spacewatch | · | 3.0 km | MPC · JPL |
| 352599 | 2008 EZ_{55} | — | March 7, 2008 | Mount Lemmon | Mount Lemmon Survey | · | 2.3 km | MPC · JPL |
| 352600 | 2008 EB_{56} | — | March 7, 2008 | Mount Lemmon | Mount Lemmon Survey | THM | 1.8 km | MPC · JPL |

== 352601–352700 ==
back to top

| Designation | | | Discovery | | | Properties | | Ref |
| Permanent | Provisional | Named after | Date | Site | Discoverer(s) | Category | Diam. | Ref |
|---|---|---|---|---|---|---|---|---|
| 352601 | 2008 ER_{56} | — | March 7, 2008 | Catalina | CSS | · | 2.5 km | MPC · JPL |
| 352602 | 2008 EN_{69} | — | March 7, 2008 | Kitt Peak | Spacewatch | · | 3.2 km | MPC · JPL |
| 352603 | 2008 EK_{79} | — | March 8, 2008 | Catalina | CSS | · | 3.0 km | MPC · JPL |
| 352604 | 2008 ES_{87} | — | March 10, 2008 | Catalina | CSS | · | 2.7 km | MPC · JPL |
| 352605 | 2008 EH_{90} | — | March 14, 2008 | Socorro | LINEAR | · | 5.2 km | MPC · JPL |
| 352606 | 2008 ET_{90} | — | March 2, 2008 | Mount Lemmon | Mount Lemmon Survey | · | 3.5 km | MPC · JPL |
| 352607 | 2008 EX_{92} | — | March 6, 2008 | Catalina | CSS | (22805) · fast | 4.9 km | MPC · JPL |
| 352608 | 2008 EX_{93} | — | March 3, 2008 | Mount Lemmon | Mount Lemmon Survey | · | 3.6 km | MPC · JPL |
| 352609 | 2008 EA_{94} | — | March 3, 2008 | Purple Mountain | PMO NEO Survey Program | CYB | 5.2 km | MPC · JPL |
| 352610 | 2008 EF_{97} | — | March 7, 2008 | Mount Lemmon | Mount Lemmon Survey | · | 2.0 km | MPC · JPL |
| 352611 | 2008 EE_{101} | — | February 11, 2008 | Mount Lemmon | Mount Lemmon Survey | LUT | 4.8 km | MPC · JPL |
| 352612 | 2008 EH_{136} | — | February 28, 2008 | Kitt Peak | Spacewatch | · | 3.3 km | MPC · JPL |
| 352613 | 2008 EC_{138} | — | March 11, 2008 | Catalina | CSS | · | 7.5 km | MPC · JPL |
| 352614 | 2008 EM_{146} | — | March 5, 2008 | Mount Lemmon | Mount Lemmon Survey | · | 3.9 km | MPC · JPL |
| 352615 | 2008 EA_{152} | — | March 10, 2008 | Kitt Peak | Spacewatch | · | 3.8 km | MPC · JPL |
| 352616 | 2008 EX_{168} | — | March 13, 2008 | Catalina | CSS | · | 4.3 km | MPC · JPL |
| 352617 | 2008 FE_{1} | — | March 25, 2008 | Kitt Peak | Spacewatch | · | 3.0 km | MPC · JPL |
| 352618 | 2008 FQ_{1} | — | March 25, 2008 | Kitt Peak | Spacewatch | · | 3.7 km | MPC · JPL |
| 352619 | 2008 FV_{2} | — | March 25, 2008 | Kitt Peak | Spacewatch | · | 2.1 km | MPC · JPL |
| 352620 | 2008 FG_{3} | — | March 25, 2008 | Kitt Peak | Spacewatch | · | 2.0 km | MPC · JPL |
| 352621 | 2008 FO_{6} | — | March 30, 2008 | Catalina | CSS | H | 950 m | MPC · JPL |
| 352622 | 2008 FA_{7} | — | March 30, 2008 | Grove Creek | Tozzi, F. | THB | 4.2 km | MPC · JPL |
| 352623 | 2008 FH_{7} | — | March 30, 2008 | Catalina | CSS | H | 670 m | MPC · JPL |
| 352624 | 2008 FQ_{11} | — | February 26, 2008 | Mount Lemmon | Mount Lemmon Survey | · | 2.8 km | MPC · JPL |
| 352625 | 2008 FA_{16} | — | March 27, 2008 | Mount Lemmon | Mount Lemmon Survey | EOS | 2.0 km | MPC · JPL |
| 352626 | 2008 FT_{33} | — | March 28, 2008 | Mount Lemmon | Mount Lemmon Survey | HYG | 2.5 km | MPC · JPL |
| 352627 | 2008 FD_{40} | — | March 28, 2008 | Kitt Peak | Spacewatch | · | 3.1 km | MPC · JPL |
| 352628 | 2008 FA_{41} | — | March 28, 2008 | Kitt Peak | Spacewatch | · | 3.4 km | MPC · JPL |
| 352629 | 2008 FF_{78} | — | March 27, 2008 | Mount Lemmon | Mount Lemmon Survey | · | 3.0 km | MPC · JPL |
| 352630 | 2008 FX_{89} | — | March 29, 2008 | Mount Lemmon | Mount Lemmon Survey | · | 1.5 km | MPC · JPL |
| 352631 | 2008 FH_{115} | — | March 31, 2008 | Mount Lemmon | Mount Lemmon Survey | · | 2.8 km | MPC · JPL |
| 352632 | 2008 FJ_{122} | — | March 30, 2008 | Črni Vrh | Skvarč, J. | EUP | 3.5 km | MPC · JPL |
| 352633 | 2008 GM_{31} | — | April 3, 2008 | Kitt Peak | Spacewatch | H | 610 m | MPC · JPL |
| 352634 | 2008 GB_{64} | — | April 5, 2008 | Catalina | CSS | H | 700 m | MPC · JPL |
| 352635 | 2008 GK_{88} | — | April 6, 2008 | Kitt Peak | Spacewatch | CYB | 3.2 km | MPC · JPL |
| 352636 | 2008 GW_{89} | — | April 6, 2008 | Mount Lemmon | Mount Lemmon Survey | · | 3.4 km | MPC · JPL |
| 352637 | 2008 GW_{108} | — | April 13, 2008 | Kitt Peak | Spacewatch | CYB | 5.0 km | MPC · JPL |
| 352638 | 2008 GY_{110} | — | April 3, 2008 | Catalina | CSS | H | 660 m | MPC · JPL |
| 352639 | 2008 GZ_{110} | — | April 3, 2008 | Catalina | CSS | H | 790 m | MPC · JPL |
| 352640 | 2008 GE_{111} | — | April 12, 2008 | Dauban | Kugel, F. | T_{j} (2.98) | 3.8 km | MPC · JPL |
| 352641 | 2008 HA_{62} | — | April 30, 2008 | Kitt Peak | Spacewatch | · | 750 m | MPC · JPL |
| 352642 | 2008 JM | — | May 2, 2008 | Catalina | CSS | H | 720 m | MPC · JPL |
| 352643 | 2008 JB_{32} | — | May 5, 2008 | Mount Lemmon | Mount Lemmon Survey | · | 3.4 km | MPC · JPL |
| 352644 | 2008 KQ_{36} | — | May 29, 2008 | Kitt Peak | Spacewatch | · | 830 m | MPC · JPL |
| 352645 | 2008 LW_{2} | — | June 1, 2008 | Kitt Peak | Spacewatch | · | 2.6 km | MPC · JPL |
| 352646 Blumbahs | 2008 OZ_{1} | Blumbahs | July 25, 2008 | Baldone | K. Černis, I. Eglītis | · | 830 m | MPC · JPL |
| 352647 | 2008 OD_{14} | — | July 31, 2008 | La Sagra | OAM | · | 910 m | MPC · JPL |
| 352648 | 2008 OA_{18} | — | July 30, 2008 | Kitt Peak | Spacewatch | · | 830 m | MPC · JPL |
| 352649 | 2008 OQ_{22} | — | July 29, 2008 | Kitt Peak | Spacewatch | L4 | 9.2 km | MPC · JPL |
| 352650 | 2008 PF_{9} | — | August 7, 2008 | Dauban | Kugel, F. | · | 730 m | MPC · JPL |
| 352651 | 2008 QA_{9} | — | August 25, 2008 | La Sagra | OAM | · | 740 m | MPC · JPL |
| 352652 | 2008 QR_{10} | — | August 26, 2008 | Dauban | Kugel, F. | · | 1.5 km | MPC · JPL |
| 352653 | 2008 QE_{17} | — | August 27, 2008 | La Sagra | OAM | · | 700 m | MPC · JPL |
| 352654 | 2008 QJ_{24} | — | August 25, 2008 | Andrushivka | Andrushivka | · | 860 m | MPC · JPL |
| 352655 Alekna | 2008 QX_{28} | Alekna | August 31, 2008 | Moletai | K. Černis, E. Černis | L4 | 10 km | MPC · JPL |
| 352656 | 2008 QR_{29} | — | August 24, 2008 | La Sagra | OAM | · | 670 m | MPC · JPL |
| 352657 | 2008 QS_{33} | — | August 27, 2008 | La Sagra | OAM | · | 1.0 km | MPC · JPL |
| 352658 | 2008 QZ_{33} | — | August 28, 2008 | La Sagra | OAM | MAS | 890 m | MPC · JPL |
| 352659 | 2008 RE_{2} | — | September 2, 2008 | Kitt Peak | Spacewatch | L4 | 10 km | MPC · JPL |
| 352660 | 2008 RX_{3} | — | September 2, 2008 | Kitt Peak | Spacewatch | NYS | 950 m | MPC · JPL |
| 352661 | 2008 RY_{5} | — | September 2, 2008 | Kitt Peak | Spacewatch | · | 1.1 km | MPC · JPL |
| 352662 | 2008 RM_{14} | — | September 4, 2008 | Kitt Peak | Spacewatch | L4 · (8060) | 10 km | MPC · JPL |
| 352663 | 2008 RZ_{16} | — | September 4, 2008 | Kitt Peak | Spacewatch | · | 740 m | MPC · JPL |
| 352664 | 2008 RC_{23} | — | September 4, 2008 | Socorro | LINEAR | · | 1.3 km | MPC · JPL |
| 352665 | 2008 RW_{56} | — | September 3, 2008 | Kitt Peak | Spacewatch | · | 710 m | MPC · JPL |
| 352666 | 2008 RZ_{58} | — | September 3, 2008 | Kitt Peak | Spacewatch | L4 | 8.6 km | MPC · JPL |
| 352667 | 2008 RA_{69} | — | September 4, 2008 | Kitt Peak | Spacewatch | · | 840 m | MPC · JPL |
| 352668 | 2008 RQ_{72} | — | September 6, 2008 | Mount Lemmon | Mount Lemmon Survey | L4 · ERY | 10 km | MPC · JPL |
| 352669 | 2008 RN_{77} | — | September 6, 2008 | Catalina | CSS | NYS | 1.3 km | MPC · JPL |
| 352670 | 2008 RU_{87} | — | September 5, 2008 | Kitt Peak | Spacewatch | · | 820 m | MPC · JPL |
| 352671 | 2008 RC_{95} | — | September 7, 2008 | Mount Lemmon | Mount Lemmon Survey | L4 | 8.9 km | MPC · JPL |
| 352672 | 2008 RK_{99} | — | September 2, 2008 | Kitt Peak | Spacewatch | · | 670 m | MPC · JPL |
| 352673 | 2008 RZ_{100} | — | September 5, 2008 | Kitt Peak | Spacewatch | · | 880 m | MPC · JPL |
| 352674 | 2008 RR_{101} | — | September 2, 2008 | Kitt Peak | Spacewatch | MAS | 730 m | MPC · JPL |
| 352675 | 2008 RO_{106} | — | September 7, 2008 | Mount Lemmon | Mount Lemmon Survey | · | 840 m | MPC · JPL |
| 352676 | 2008 RO_{107} | — | September 7, 2008 | Mount Lemmon | Mount Lemmon Survey | V | 650 m | MPC · JPL |
| 352677 | 2008 RQ_{107} | — | September 8, 2008 | Mount Lemmon | Mount Lemmon Survey | · | 1.5 km | MPC · JPL |
| 352678 | 2008 RG_{109} | — | September 2, 2008 | Kitt Peak | Spacewatch | MAS | 530 m | MPC · JPL |
| 352679 | 2008 RR_{111} | — | September 4, 2008 | Kitt Peak | Spacewatch | · | 730 m | MPC · JPL |
| 352680 | 2008 RL_{136} | — | September 4, 2008 | Kitt Peak | Spacewatch | · | 1.0 km | MPC · JPL |
| 352681 | 2008 SS_{3} | — | September 22, 2008 | Socorro | LINEAR | · | 950 m | MPC · JPL |
| 352682 | 2008 ST_{5} | — | September 22, 2008 | Socorro | LINEAR | · | 800 m | MPC · JPL |
| 352683 | 2008 SU_{5} | — | September 22, 2008 | Socorro | LINEAR | · | 950 m | MPC · JPL |
| 352684 | 2008 SU_{8} | — | September 22, 2008 | Socorro | LINEAR | · | 830 m | MPC · JPL |
| 352685 | 2008 SP_{28} | — | September 19, 2008 | Kitt Peak | Spacewatch | V | 830 m | MPC · JPL |
| 352686 | 2008 SV_{29} | — | September 19, 2008 | Kitt Peak | Spacewatch | · | 1.1 km | MPC · JPL |
| 352687 | 2008 SY_{35} | — | September 20, 2008 | Kitt Peak | Spacewatch | · | 1.1 km | MPC · JPL |
| 352688 | 2008 SE_{46} | — | September 20, 2008 | Kitt Peak | Spacewatch | · | 880 m | MPC · JPL |
| 352689 | 2008 SM_{60} | — | September 20, 2008 | Catalina | CSS | · | 860 m | MPC · JPL |
| 352690 | 2008 SR_{74} | — | September 23, 2008 | Mount Lemmon | Mount Lemmon Survey | (1338) (FLO) | 740 m | MPC · JPL |
| 352691 | 2008 SH_{84} | — | September 27, 2008 | Sierra Stars | Tozzi, F. | · | 1.4 km | MPC · JPL |
| 352692 | 2008 SS_{85} | — | September 19, 2008 | Kitt Peak | Spacewatch | L4 | 9.6 km | MPC · JPL |
| 352693 | 2008 SQ_{88} | — | September 20, 2008 | Kitt Peak | Spacewatch | · | 920 m | MPC · JPL |
| 352694 | 2008 SB_{100} | — | September 21, 2008 | Kitt Peak | Spacewatch | PHO | 2.2 km | MPC · JPL |
| 352695 | 2008 SE_{105} | — | September 21, 2008 | Kitt Peak | Spacewatch | · | 1.4 km | MPC · JPL |
| 352696 | 2008 SP_{105} | — | September 21, 2008 | Kitt Peak | Spacewatch | · | 710 m | MPC · JPL |
| 352697 | 2008 SE_{106} | — | September 21, 2008 | Kitt Peak | Spacewatch | · | 1.0 km | MPC · JPL |
| 352698 | 2008 SA_{107} | — | September 21, 2008 | Kitt Peak | Spacewatch | · | 1.2 km | MPC · JPL |
| 352699 | 2008 SO_{117} | — | September 22, 2008 | Mount Lemmon | Mount Lemmon Survey | MAS | 780 m | MPC · JPL |
| 352700 | 2008 SV_{118} | — | September 22, 2008 | Mount Lemmon | Mount Lemmon Survey | V | 750 m | MPC · JPL |

== 352701–352800 ==
back to top

| Designation | | | Discovery | | | Properties | | Ref |
| Permanent | Provisional | Named after | Date | Site | Discoverer(s) | Category | Diam. | Ref |
|---|---|---|---|---|---|---|---|---|
| 352701 | 2008 SE_{137} | — | December 3, 2005 | Mauna Kea | A. Boattini | · | 1.7 km | MPC · JPL |
| 352702 | 2008 SS_{138} | — | September 23, 2008 | Kitt Peak | Spacewatch | · | 820 m | MPC · JPL |
| 352703 | 2008 SO_{151} | — | September 29, 2008 | Dauban | Kugel, F. | · | 980 m | MPC · JPL |
| 352704 Stevefleming | 2008 SW_{151} | Stevefleming | September 26, 2008 | Charleston | R. Holmes | · | 650 m | MPC · JPL |
| 352705 | 2008 SC_{152} | — | September 28, 2008 | Taunus | E. Schwab, R. Kling | · | 840 m | MPC · JPL |
| 352706 | 2008 SF_{179} | — | September 24, 2008 | Kitt Peak | Spacewatch | · | 570 m | MPC · JPL |
| 352707 | 2008 SQ_{179} | — | September 24, 2008 | Mount Lemmon | Mount Lemmon Survey | · | 850 m | MPC · JPL |
| 352708 | 2008 SH_{180} | — | September 24, 2008 | Mount Lemmon | Mount Lemmon Survey | · | 1.5 km | MPC · JPL |
| 352709 | 2008 SM_{188} | — | September 25, 2008 | Kitt Peak | Spacewatch | · | 1.3 km | MPC · JPL |
| 352710 | 2008 SW_{189} | — | September 25, 2008 | Kitt Peak | Spacewatch | · | 630 m | MPC · JPL |
| 352711 | 2008 SZ_{189} | — | September 25, 2008 | Kitt Peak | Spacewatch | · | 1.4 km | MPC · JPL |
| 352712 | 2008 SM_{191} | — | September 25, 2008 | Mount Lemmon | Mount Lemmon Survey | · | 840 m | MPC · JPL |
| 352713 | 2008 SH_{195} | — | September 25, 2008 | Kitt Peak | Spacewatch | · | 2.3 km | MPC · JPL |
| 352714 | 2008 SS_{195} | — | September 25, 2008 | Kitt Peak | Spacewatch | V | 820 m | MPC · JPL |
| 352715 | 2008 SU_{202} | — | September 26, 2008 | Kitt Peak | Spacewatch | · | 880 m | MPC · JPL |
| 352716 | 2008 SF_{211} | — | September 28, 2008 | Catalina | CSS | V | 690 m | MPC · JPL |
| 352717 | 2008 SR_{211} | — | September 28, 2008 | Kitt Peak | Spacewatch | · | 1.5 km | MPC · JPL |
| 352718 | 2008 SK_{217} | — | September 29, 2008 | Mount Lemmon | Mount Lemmon Survey | V | 600 m | MPC · JPL |
| 352719 | 2008 SU_{218} | — | September 30, 2008 | La Sagra | OAM | · | 840 m | MPC · JPL |
| 352720 | 2008 SX_{222} | — | September 25, 2008 | Mount Lemmon | Mount Lemmon Survey | · | 660 m | MPC · JPL |
| 352721 | 2008 SB_{225} | — | September 26, 2008 | Kitt Peak | Spacewatch | MAS | 610 m | MPC · JPL |
| 352722 | 2008 SQ_{243} | — | September 29, 2008 | Kitt Peak | Spacewatch | · | 980 m | MPC · JPL |
| 352723 | 2008 SO_{272} | — | September 23, 2008 | Mount Lemmon | Mount Lemmon Survey | · | 1.1 km | MPC · JPL |
| 352724 | 2008 SU_{281} | — | September 23, 2008 | Mount Lemmon | Mount Lemmon Survey | MAS | 690 m | MPC · JPL |
| 352725 | 2008 SV_{285} | — | September 21, 2008 | Kitt Peak | Spacewatch | · | 1.3 km | MPC · JPL |
| 352726 | 2008 SJ_{287} | — | September 23, 2008 | Kitt Peak | Spacewatch | · | 740 m | MPC · JPL |
| 352727 | 2008 SM_{288} | — | September 24, 2008 | Kitt Peak | Spacewatch | · | 700 m | MPC · JPL |
| 352728 | 2008 SU_{288} | — | September 24, 2008 | Kitt Peak | Spacewatch | · | 770 m | MPC · JPL |
| 352729 | 2008 SH_{289} | — | September 25, 2008 | Kitt Peak | Spacewatch | · | 620 m | MPC · JPL |
| 352730 | 2008 SX_{293} | — | September 20, 2008 | Catalina | CSS | V | 680 m | MPC · JPL |
| 352731 | 2008 SC_{294} | — | September 20, 2008 | Catalina | CSS | · | 940 m | MPC · JPL |
| 352732 | 2008 SK_{294} | — | August 29, 2008 | Lulin | LUSS | · | 850 m | MPC · JPL |
| 352733 | 2008 SK_{300} | — | September 23, 2008 | Kitt Peak | Spacewatch | · | 930 m | MPC · JPL |
| 352734 | 2008 SG_{301} | — | September 23, 2008 | Kitt Peak | Spacewatch | · | 1.1 km | MPC · JPL |
| 352735 | 2008 SQ_{301} | — | September 23, 2008 | Socorro | LINEAR | · | 1.3 km | MPC · JPL |
| 352736 | 2008 SC_{304} | — | September 24, 2008 | Mount Lemmon | Mount Lemmon Survey | · | 1.3 km | MPC · JPL |
| 352737 | 2008 TQ_{16} | — | October 1, 2008 | Mount Lemmon | Mount Lemmon Survey | · | 590 m | MPC · JPL |
| 352738 | 2008 TY_{20} | — | October 1, 2008 | Mount Lemmon | Mount Lemmon Survey | · | 1.2 km | MPC · JPL |
| 352739 | 2008 TJ_{56} | — | October 2, 2008 | Kitt Peak | Spacewatch | · | 1.5 km | MPC · JPL |
| 352740 | 2008 TC_{62} | — | October 2, 2008 | Catalina | CSS | RAF | 1.1 km | MPC · JPL |
| 352741 | 2008 TF_{64} | — | October 2, 2008 | Kitt Peak | Spacewatch | · | 700 m | MPC · JPL |
| 352742 | 2008 TO_{67} | — | October 2, 2008 | Kitt Peak | Spacewatch | · | 820 m | MPC · JPL |
| 352743 | 2008 TW_{71} | — | October 2, 2008 | Kitt Peak | Spacewatch | · | 1.1 km | MPC · JPL |
| 352744 | 2008 TT_{82} | — | October 3, 2008 | La Sagra | OAM | · | 1.5 km | MPC · JPL |
| 352745 | 2008 TS_{98} | — | October 6, 2008 | Kitt Peak | Spacewatch | · | 830 m | MPC · JPL |
| 352746 | 2008 TX_{101} | — | October 6, 2008 | Kitt Peak | Spacewatch | · | 660 m | MPC · JPL |
| 352747 | 2008 TW_{104} | — | December 8, 2005 | Kitt Peak | Spacewatch | · | 680 m | MPC · JPL |
| 352748 | 2008 TS_{111} | — | October 6, 2008 | Catalina | CSS | · | 1.3 km | MPC · JPL |
| 352749 | 2008 TB_{117} | — | October 6, 2008 | Mount Lemmon | Mount Lemmon Survey | NYS | 1.1 km | MPC · JPL |
| 352750 | 2008 TO_{117} | — | October 6, 2008 | Kitt Peak | Spacewatch | · | 800 m | MPC · JPL |
| 352751 | 2008 TY_{120} | — | October 7, 2008 | Mount Lemmon | Mount Lemmon Survey | · | 1.8 km | MPC · JPL |
| 352752 | 2008 TP_{121} | — | October 7, 2008 | Kitt Peak | Spacewatch | · | 810 m | MPC · JPL |
| 352753 | 2008 TN_{139} | — | October 8, 2008 | Mount Lemmon | Mount Lemmon Survey | · | 1.1 km | MPC · JPL |
| 352754 | 2008 TG_{150} | — | October 9, 2008 | Mount Lemmon | Mount Lemmon Survey | · | 630 m | MPC · JPL |
| 352755 | 2008 TF_{162} | — | October 2, 2008 | Kitt Peak | Spacewatch | · | 940 m | MPC · JPL |
| 352756 | 2008 TD_{167} | — | October 8, 2008 | Mount Lemmon | Mount Lemmon Survey | · | 850 m | MPC · JPL |
| 352757 | 2008 TH_{175} | — | October 8, 2008 | Kitt Peak | Spacewatch | · | 630 m | MPC · JPL |
| 352758 | 2008 TY_{177} | — | October 1, 2008 | Catalina | CSS | · | 1.6 km | MPC · JPL |
| 352759 | 2008 TC_{182} | — | October 1, 2008 | Catalina | CSS | PHO | 1.1 km | MPC · JPL |
| 352760 Tesorero | 2008 UR_{4} | Tesorero | October 24, 2008 | La Cañada | Lacruz, J. | NYS | 1.0 km | MPC · JPL |
| 352761 | 2008 UL_{5} | — | October 25, 2008 | Socorro | LINEAR | · | 1.7 km | MPC · JPL |
| 352762 | 2008 UW_{6} | — | October 24, 2008 | Catalina | CSS | · | 2.0 km | MPC · JPL |
| 352763 | 2008 UJ_{7} | — | September 6, 2008 | Siding Spring | SSS | PHO | 1.9 km | MPC · JPL |
| 352764 | 2008 UF_{15} | — | October 18, 2008 | Kitt Peak | Spacewatch | · | 1.5 km | MPC · JPL |
| 352765 | 2008 UY_{16} | — | October 18, 2008 | Kitt Peak | Spacewatch | · | 650 m | MPC · JPL |
| 352766 | 2008 UQ_{24} | — | October 20, 2008 | Kitt Peak | Spacewatch | · | 1.1 km | MPC · JPL |
| 352767 | 2008 UD_{25} | — | October 20, 2008 | Mount Lemmon | Mount Lemmon Survey | · | 930 m | MPC · JPL |
| 352768 | 2008 UN_{32} | — | October 20, 2008 | Kitt Peak | Spacewatch | MAS | 730 m | MPC · JPL |
| 352769 | 2008 UV_{34} | — | October 20, 2008 | Kitt Peak | Spacewatch | · | 1.4 km | MPC · JPL |
| 352770 | 2008 UU_{41} | — | October 20, 2008 | Kitt Peak | Spacewatch | NYS | 1.1 km | MPC · JPL |
| 352771 | 2008 US_{48} | — | October 20, 2008 | Kitt Peak | Spacewatch | · | 1.2 km | MPC · JPL |
| 352772 | 2008 UO_{49} | — | October 20, 2008 | Mount Lemmon | Mount Lemmon Survey | MAS | 630 m | MPC · JPL |
| 352773 | 2008 UR_{54} | — | October 20, 2008 | Mount Lemmon | Mount Lemmon Survey | · | 2.8 km | MPC · JPL |
| 352774 | 2008 UB_{58} | — | October 21, 2008 | Kitt Peak | Spacewatch | · | 890 m | MPC · JPL |
| 352775 | 2008 UE_{70} | — | October 21, 2008 | Mount Lemmon | Mount Lemmon Survey | · | 740 m | MPC · JPL |
| 352776 | 2008 UA_{72} | — | October 21, 2008 | Kitt Peak | Spacewatch | · | 1.6 km | MPC · JPL |
| 352777 | 2008 UL_{72} | — | October 21, 2008 | Mount Lemmon | Mount Lemmon Survey | · | 1.8 km | MPC · JPL |
| 352778 | 2008 UP_{74} | — | October 21, 2008 | Kitt Peak | Spacewatch | · | 1.5 km | MPC · JPL |
| 352779 | 2008 UA_{78} | — | October 21, 2008 | Kitt Peak | Spacewatch | · | 1.6 km | MPC · JPL |
| 352780 | 2008 UE_{80} | — | October 22, 2008 | Kitt Peak | Spacewatch | · | 870 m | MPC · JPL |
| 352781 | 2008 UT_{90} | — | October 24, 2008 | Mount Lemmon | Mount Lemmon Survey | MAS | 680 m | MPC · JPL |
| 352782 Karelschrijver | 2008 UE_{97} | Karelschrijver | December 1, 2005 | Kitt Peak | L. H. Wasserman, R. L. Millis | · | 1.0 km | MPC · JPL |
| 352783 | 2008 UT_{97} | — | October 26, 2008 | Socorro | LINEAR | · | 880 m | MPC · JPL |
| 352784 | 2008 UH_{112} | — | October 22, 2008 | Kitt Peak | Spacewatch | · | 3.2 km | MPC · JPL |
| 352785 | 2008 US_{114} | — | October 22, 2008 | Kitt Peak | Spacewatch | NYS | 1.1 km | MPC · JPL |
| 352786 | 2008 UP_{123} | — | October 22, 2008 | Kitt Peak | Spacewatch | · | 1.2 km | MPC · JPL |
| 352787 | 2008 UP_{124} | — | October 22, 2008 | Kitt Peak | Spacewatch | · | 890 m | MPC · JPL |
| 352788 | 2008 UN_{141} | — | October 23, 2008 | Kitt Peak | Spacewatch | MAS | 670 m | MPC · JPL |
| 352789 | 2008 UB_{148} | — | October 23, 2008 | Kitt Peak | Spacewatch | MAS | 790 m | MPC · JPL |
| 352790 | 2008 UT_{164} | — | October 24, 2008 | Kitt Peak | Spacewatch | · | 840 m | MPC · JPL |
| 352791 | 2008 UR_{179} | — | October 24, 2008 | Kitt Peak | Spacewatch | · | 1.3 km | MPC · JPL |
| 352792 | 2008 UB_{187} | — | October 24, 2008 | Kitt Peak | Spacewatch | V | 790 m | MPC · JPL |
| 352793 | 2008 UF_{189} | — | October 25, 2008 | Mount Lemmon | Mount Lemmon Survey | L4 | 8.6 km | MPC · JPL |
| 352794 | 2008 UR_{197} | — | October 27, 2008 | Kitt Peak | Spacewatch | NYS | 980 m | MPC · JPL |
| 352795 | 2008 UZ_{198} | — | October 27, 2008 | Socorro | LINEAR | · | 1.2 km | MPC · JPL |
| 352796 | 2008 UD_{199} | — | October 27, 2008 | Socorro | LINEAR | · | 1.6 km | MPC · JPL |
| 352797 | 2008 UR_{204} | — | October 27, 2008 | Socorro | LINEAR | V | 750 m | MPC · JPL |
| 352798 | 2008 UF_{213} | — | October 24, 2008 | Catalina | CSS | · | 1 km | MPC · JPL |
| 352799 | 2008 UM_{216} | — | October 24, 2008 | Kitt Peak | Spacewatch | · | 1.8 km | MPC · JPL |
| 352800 | 2008 UR_{218} | — | October 25, 2008 | Kitt Peak | Spacewatch | · | 1.3 km | MPC · JPL |

== 352801–352900 ==
back to top

| Designation | | | Discovery | | | Properties | | Ref |
| Permanent | Provisional | Named after | Date | Site | Discoverer(s) | Category | Diam. | Ref |
|---|---|---|---|---|---|---|---|---|
| 352801 | 2008 UW_{218} | — | October 25, 2008 | Kitt Peak | Spacewatch | · | 890 m | MPC · JPL |
| 352802 | 2008 UK_{223} | — | October 25, 2008 | Kitt Peak | Spacewatch | · | 910 m | MPC · JPL |
| 352803 | 2008 UF_{236} | — | October 26, 2008 | Kitt Peak | Spacewatch | · | 930 m | MPC · JPL |
| 352804 | 2008 UB_{241} | — | October 26, 2008 | Kitt Peak | Spacewatch | · | 1.2 km | MPC · JPL |
| 352805 | 2008 UV_{242} | — | October 26, 2008 | Mount Lemmon | Mount Lemmon Survey | · | 1.5 km | MPC · JPL |
| 352806 | 2008 US_{245} | — | October 26, 2008 | Kitt Peak | Spacewatch | · | 1.4 km | MPC · JPL |
| 352807 | 2008 UW_{257} | — | October 27, 2008 | Kitt Peak | Spacewatch | · | 1.0 km | MPC · JPL |
| 352808 | 2008 UR_{263} | — | October 27, 2008 | Kitt Peak | Spacewatch | · | 1.4 km | MPC · JPL |
| 352809 | 2008 UO_{277} | — | October 28, 2008 | Mount Lemmon | Mount Lemmon Survey | · | 830 m | MPC · JPL |
| 352810 | 2008 UD_{281} | — | October 23, 2008 | Kitt Peak | Spacewatch | · | 1.7 km | MPC · JPL |
| 352811 | 2008 UV_{282} | — | October 28, 2008 | Mount Lemmon | Mount Lemmon Survey | · | 1.4 km | MPC · JPL |
| 352812 | 2008 UG_{284} | — | October 28, 2008 | Mount Lemmon | Mount Lemmon Survey | · | 1.3 km | MPC · JPL |
| 352813 | 2008 UL_{285} | — | October 28, 2008 | Kitt Peak | Spacewatch | MAS | 650 m | MPC · JPL |
| 352814 | 2008 UJ_{287} | — | October 28, 2008 | Mount Lemmon | Mount Lemmon Survey | NYS | 1.1 km | MPC · JPL |
| 352815 | 2008 UP_{287} | — | October 28, 2008 | Mount Lemmon | Mount Lemmon Survey | · | 1.3 km | MPC · JPL |
| 352816 | 2008 US_{291} | — | October 29, 2008 | Kitt Peak | Spacewatch | NYS | 940 m | MPC · JPL |
| 352817 | 2008 UZ_{301} | — | September 29, 2008 | Kitt Peak | Spacewatch | · | 690 m | MPC · JPL |
| 352818 | 2008 UQ_{310} | — | October 30, 2008 | Catalina | CSS | V | 720 m | MPC · JPL |
| 352819 | 2008 UQ_{312} | — | October 30, 2008 | Kitt Peak | Spacewatch | · | 2.5 km | MPC · JPL |
| 352820 | 2008 UY_{313} | — | October 30, 2008 | Mount Lemmon | Mount Lemmon Survey | · | 900 m | MPC · JPL |
| 352821 | 2008 UX_{324} | — | October 31, 2008 | Kitt Peak | Spacewatch | NYS | 910 m | MPC · JPL |
| 352822 | 2008 UZ_{326} | — | October 31, 2008 | Mount Lemmon | Mount Lemmon Survey | ADE | 3.1 km | MPC · JPL |
| 352823 | 2008 UC_{330} | — | October 31, 2008 | Kitt Peak | Spacewatch | · | 1.3 km | MPC · JPL |
| 352824 | 2008 UA_{331} | — | October 31, 2008 | Mount Lemmon | Mount Lemmon Survey | · | 780 m | MPC · JPL |
| 352825 | 2008 UL_{340} | — | October 23, 2008 | Kitt Peak | Spacewatch | NYS | 980 m | MPC · JPL |
| 352826 | 2008 UH_{343} | — | October 24, 2008 | Catalina | CSS | · | 1.6 km | MPC · JPL |
| 352827 | 2008 UG_{350} | — | October 21, 2008 | Kitt Peak | Spacewatch | · | 1.1 km | MPC · JPL |
| 352828 | 2008 UK_{351} | — | October 27, 2008 | Kitt Peak | Spacewatch | · | 940 m | MPC · JPL |
| 352829 | 2008 UU_{355} | — | October 27, 2008 | Mount Lemmon | Mount Lemmon Survey | · | 1.0 km | MPC · JPL |
| 352830 | 2008 UX_{355} | — | October 29, 2008 | Kitt Peak | Spacewatch | · | 1.2 km | MPC · JPL |
| 352831 | 2008 US_{368} | — | October 25, 2008 | Mount Lemmon | Mount Lemmon Survey | · | 1.4 km | MPC · JPL |
| 352832 | 2008 UE_{370} | — | October 20, 2008 | Kitt Peak | Spacewatch | MAS | 700 m | MPC · JPL |
| 352833 | 2008 VN_{2} | — | August 7, 2008 | Kitt Peak | Spacewatch | MAR | 1.5 km | MPC · JPL |
| 352834 Málaga | 2008 VN_{4} | Málaga | November 6, 2008 | Málaga | Ruiz, J. M., Muler, G. | · | 1.3 km | MPC · JPL |
| 352835 | 2008 VR_{13} | — | November 6, 2008 | Ondřejov | Ondrejov | ERI | 1.7 km | MPC · JPL |
| 352836 | 2008 VU_{14} | — | November 10, 2008 | La Sagra | OAM | · | 2.4 km | MPC · JPL |
| 352837 | 2008 VU_{16} | — | November 1, 2008 | Kitt Peak | Spacewatch | · | 740 m | MPC · JPL |
| 352838 | 2008 VO_{50} | — | November 4, 2008 | Catalina | CSS | MAS | 730 m | MPC · JPL |
| 352839 | 2008 VK_{68} | — | November 7, 2008 | Mount Lemmon | Mount Lemmon Survey | · | 1.7 km | MPC · JPL |
| 352840 | 2008 VS_{68} | — | November 8, 2008 | Mount Lemmon | Mount Lemmon Survey | · | 1.5 km | MPC · JPL |
| 352841 | 2008 VR_{72} | — | November 8, 2008 | Mount Lemmon | Mount Lemmon Survey | · | 1.5 km | MPC · JPL |
| 352842 | 2008 VX_{72} | — | November 1, 2008 | Mount Lemmon | Mount Lemmon Survey | · | 1.5 km | MPC · JPL |
| 352843 | 2008 VO_{73} | — | November 6, 2008 | Mount Lemmon | Mount Lemmon Survey | · | 1.0 km | MPC · JPL |
| 352844 | 2008 VW_{75} | — | November 8, 2008 | Mount Lemmon | Mount Lemmon Survey | · | 2.9 km | MPC · JPL |
| 352845 | 2008 VN_{78} | — | November 7, 2008 | Mount Lemmon | Mount Lemmon Survey | · | 1.6 km | MPC · JPL |
| 352846 | 2008 WY_{11} | — | November 18, 2008 | Catalina | CSS | MAS | 590 m | MPC · JPL |
| 352847 | 2008 WB_{22} | — | December 3, 2004 | Eskridge | G. Hug | · | 1.1 km | MPC · JPL |
| 352848 | 2008 WX_{22} | — | November 18, 2008 | Catalina | CSS | · | 2.2 km | MPC · JPL |
| 352849 | 2008 WT_{24} | — | November 18, 2008 | Catalina | CSS | · | 1.1 km | MPC · JPL |
| 352850 | 2008 WE_{25} | — | November 18, 2008 | Catalina | CSS | NYS | 1.1 km | MPC · JPL |
| 352851 | 2008 WF_{31} | — | November 19, 2008 | Mount Lemmon | Mount Lemmon Survey | NYS | 1.1 km | MPC · JPL |
| 352852 | 2008 WO_{40} | — | November 17, 2008 | Kitt Peak | Spacewatch | V | 670 m | MPC · JPL |
| 352853 | 2008 WZ_{60} | — | November 20, 2008 | Socorro | LINEAR | · | 1.4 km | MPC · JPL |
| 352854 | 2008 WO_{62} | — | November 21, 2008 | Mount Lemmon | Mount Lemmon Survey | · | 1.1 km | MPC · JPL |
| 352855 | 2008 WG_{66} | — | November 18, 2008 | Catalina | CSS | · | 1.3 km | MPC · JPL |
| 352856 | 2008 WK_{67} | — | November 18, 2008 | Kitt Peak | Spacewatch | · | 1.7 km | MPC · JPL |
| 352857 | 2008 WB_{84} | — | November 20, 2008 | Kitt Peak | Spacewatch | · | 1.8 km | MPC · JPL |
| 352858 | 2008 WV_{84} | — | November 20, 2008 | Kitt Peak | Spacewatch | · | 1.6 km | MPC · JPL |
| 352859 | 2008 WX_{85} | — | November 20, 2008 | Kitt Peak | Spacewatch | NYS | 1.4 km | MPC · JPL |
| 352860 Monflier | 2008 WY_{96} | Monflier | November 30, 2008 | Vicques | M. Ory | · | 1.0 km | MPC · JPL |
| 352861 | 2008 WB_{98} | — | November 19, 2008 | Catalina | CSS | · | 1.8 km | MPC · JPL |
| 352862 | 2008 WU_{109} | — | November 30, 2008 | Kitt Peak | Spacewatch | · | 1.3 km | MPC · JPL |
| 352863 | 2008 WT_{112} | — | August 27, 2000 | Cerro Tololo | Deep Ecliptic Survey | NYS | 1.2 km | MPC · JPL |
| 352864 | 2008 WF_{115} | — | November 30, 2008 | Mount Lemmon | Mount Lemmon Survey | V | 820 m | MPC · JPL |
| 352865 | 2008 WP_{116} | — | November 30, 2008 | Kitt Peak | Spacewatch | · | 1.5 km | MPC · JPL |
| 352866 | 2008 WK_{121} | — | November 30, 2008 | Kitt Peak | Spacewatch | · | 1.4 km | MPC · JPL |
| 352867 | 2008 WA_{125} | — | November 19, 2008 | Mount Lemmon | Mount Lemmon Survey | · | 1.4 km | MPC · JPL |
| 352868 | 2008 WG_{139} | — | November 30, 2008 | Socorro | LINEAR | V | 730 m | MPC · JPL |
| 352869 | 2008 WL_{140} | — | November 18, 2008 | Catalina | CSS | PHO | 1.3 km | MPC · JPL |
| 352870 | 2008 XD_{4} | — | December 2, 2008 | Socorro | LINEAR | · | 2.3 km | MPC · JPL |
| 352871 | 2008 XJ_{8} | — | December 1, 2008 | Catalina | CSS | · | 1.4 km | MPC · JPL |
| 352872 | 2008 XO_{30} | — | December 1, 2008 | Kitt Peak | Spacewatch | · | 1.6 km | MPC · JPL |
| 352873 | 2008 XY_{31} | — | October 22, 2008 | Kitt Peak | Spacewatch | · | 1.7 km | MPC · JPL |
| 352874 | 2008 XF_{34} | — | December 2, 2008 | Kitt Peak | Spacewatch | · | 1.1 km | MPC · JPL |
| 352875 | 2008 XO_{43} | — | December 2, 2008 | Kitt Peak | Spacewatch | (5) | 1.4 km | MPC · JPL |
| 352876 | 2008 XR_{43} | — | December 2, 2008 | Kitt Peak | Spacewatch | EUN | 1.6 km | MPC · JPL |
| 352877 | 2008 XU_{47} | — | December 4, 2008 | Mount Lemmon | Mount Lemmon Survey | (5) | 1.2 km | MPC · JPL |
| 352878 | 2008 XX_{48} | — | December 4, 2008 | Mount Lemmon | Mount Lemmon Survey | · | 1.4 km | MPC · JPL |
| 352879 | 2008 XK_{52} | — | September 16, 2003 | Kitt Peak | Spacewatch | · | 1.6 km | MPC · JPL |
| 352880 | 2008 YH_{3} | — | December 22, 2008 | Socorro | LINEAR | GAL | 2.6 km | MPC · JPL |
| 352881 | 2008 YO_{3} | — | December 21, 2008 | Calar Alto | F. Hormuth | · | 2.1 km | MPC · JPL |
| 352882 | 2008 YO_{4} | — | December 22, 2008 | Dauban | Kugel, F. | · | 1.2 km | MPC · JPL |
| 352883 | 2008 YJ_{9} | — | December 23, 2008 | Dauban | Kugel, F. | · | 1.2 km | MPC · JPL |
| 352884 | 2008 YZ_{10} | — | December 20, 2008 | Mount Lemmon | Mount Lemmon Survey | · | 1.9 km | MPC · JPL |
| 352885 | 2008 YJ_{13} | — | December 21, 2008 | Mount Lemmon | Mount Lemmon Survey | · | 2.2 km | MPC · JPL |
| 352886 | 2008 YT_{20} | — | December 21, 2008 | Mount Lemmon | Mount Lemmon Survey | · | 1.2 km | MPC · JPL |
| 352887 | 2008 YP_{32} | — | December 30, 2008 | Piszkéstető | K. Sárneczky | · | 1.2 km | MPC · JPL |
| 352888 | 2008 YQ_{34} | — | December 31, 2008 | Bergisch Gladbach | W. Bickel | · | 1.3 km | MPC · JPL |
| 352889 | 2008 YF_{35} | — | December 22, 2008 | Mount Lemmon | Mount Lemmon Survey | · | 2.1 km | MPC · JPL |
| 352890 | 2008 YJ_{37} | — | December 22, 2008 | Kitt Peak | Spacewatch | · | 1.3 km | MPC · JPL |
| 352891 | 2008 YQ_{41} | — | December 29, 2008 | Kitt Peak | Spacewatch | · | 1.2 km | MPC · JPL |
| 352892 | 2008 YD_{48} | — | December 29, 2008 | Mount Lemmon | Mount Lemmon Survey | · | 1.3 km | MPC · JPL |
| 352893 | 2008 YR_{50} | — | December 29, 2008 | Mount Lemmon | Mount Lemmon Survey | · | 2.1 km | MPC · JPL |
| 352894 | 2008 YA_{53} | — | December 29, 2008 | Mount Lemmon | Mount Lemmon Survey | · | 2.3 km | MPC · JPL |
| 352895 | 2008 YW_{54} | — | October 20, 2003 | Kitt Peak | Spacewatch | · | 1.3 km | MPC · JPL |
| 352896 | 2008 YK_{62} | — | December 30, 2008 | Mount Lemmon | Mount Lemmon Survey | · | 1.5 km | MPC · JPL |
| 352897 | 2008 YP_{66} | — | December 30, 2008 | Mount Lemmon | Mount Lemmon Survey | · | 950 m | MPC · JPL |
| 352898 | 2008 YL_{71} | — | December 29, 2008 | Kitt Peak | Spacewatch | · | 1.9 km | MPC · JPL |
| 352899 | 2008 YL_{76} | — | December 30, 2008 | Mount Lemmon | Mount Lemmon Survey | · | 1.2 km | MPC · JPL |
| 352900 | 2008 YQ_{84} | — | December 31, 2008 | Kitt Peak | Spacewatch | · | 1.1 km | MPC · JPL |

== 352901–353000 ==
back to top

| Designation | | | Discovery | | | Properties | | Ref |
| Permanent | Provisional | Named after | Date | Site | Discoverer(s) | Category | Diam. | Ref |
|---|---|---|---|---|---|---|---|---|
| 352901 | 2008 YW_{96} | — | December 29, 2008 | Mount Lemmon | Mount Lemmon Survey | · | 1.5 km | MPC · JPL |
| 352902 | 2008 YV_{101} | — | December 29, 2008 | Kitt Peak | Spacewatch | · | 1.6 km | MPC · JPL |
| 352903 | 2008 YB_{102} | — | December 29, 2008 | Kitt Peak | Spacewatch | V | 820 m | MPC · JPL |
| 352904 | 2008 YX_{103} | — | July 3, 2003 | Kitt Peak | Spacewatch | PHO | 820 m | MPC · JPL |
| 352905 | 2008 YF_{106} | — | December 29, 2008 | Kitt Peak | Spacewatch | · | 2.7 km | MPC · JPL |
| 352906 | 2008 YW_{106} | — | December 29, 2008 | Kitt Peak | Spacewatch | · | 1.4 km | MPC · JPL |
| 352907 | 2008 YH_{109} | — | December 29, 2008 | Kitt Peak | Spacewatch | · | 1.3 km | MPC · JPL |
| 352908 | 2008 YV_{114} | — | December 29, 2008 | Kitt Peak | Spacewatch | · | 2.0 km | MPC · JPL |
| 352909 | 2008 YD_{121} | — | December 30, 2008 | Kitt Peak | Spacewatch | · | 2.0 km | MPC · JPL |
| 352910 | 2008 YQ_{122} | — | December 30, 2008 | Kitt Peak | Spacewatch | · | 2.1 km | MPC · JPL |
| 352911 | 2008 YF_{124} | — | December 30, 2008 | Kitt Peak | Spacewatch | · | 1.4 km | MPC · JPL |
| 352912 | 2008 YY_{135} | — | December 30, 2008 | Kitt Peak | Spacewatch | · | 1.5 km | MPC · JPL |
| 352913 | 2008 YW_{138} | — | December 30, 2008 | Mount Lemmon | Mount Lemmon Survey | · | 2.1 km | MPC · JPL |
| 352914 | 2008 YH_{139} | — | December 30, 2008 | Kitt Peak | Spacewatch | MAS | 950 m | MPC · JPL |
| 352915 | 2008 YA_{142} | — | December 30, 2008 | Kitt Peak | Spacewatch | · | 2.0 km | MPC · JPL |
| 352916 | 2008 YB_{145} | — | December 30, 2008 | Kitt Peak | Spacewatch | · | 1.8 km | MPC · JPL |
| 352917 | 2008 YJ_{145} | — | December 30, 2008 | Kitt Peak | Spacewatch | · | 1.7 km | MPC · JPL |
| 352918 | 2008 YX_{153} | — | December 21, 2008 | Catalina | CSS | BRG | 2.0 km | MPC · JPL |
| 352919 | 2008 YM_{157} | — | December 23, 2008 | Piszkéstető | K. Sárneczky | MAS | 780 m | MPC · JPL |
| 352920 | 2008 YS_{157} | — | December 29, 2008 | Mount Lemmon | Mount Lemmon Survey | HNS | 1.4 km | MPC · JPL |
| 352921 | 2008 YX_{159} | — | December 22, 2008 | Mount Lemmon | Mount Lemmon Survey | (5) | 1.2 km | MPC · JPL |
| 352922 | 2008 YF_{165} | — | December 31, 2008 | Catalina | CSS | RAF | 1 km | MPC · JPL |
| 352923 | 2008 YA_{167} | — | December 19, 2008 | Socorro | LINEAR | (5) | 2.2 km | MPC · JPL |
| 352924 | 2008 YR_{167} | — | December 22, 2008 | Mount Lemmon | Mount Lemmon Survey | MAS | 750 m | MPC · JPL |
| 352925 | 2008 YL_{169} | — | December 30, 2008 | Mount Lemmon | Mount Lemmon Survey | · | 2.1 km | MPC · JPL |
| 352926 | 2008 YG_{170} | — | December 22, 2008 | Kitt Peak | Spacewatch | ADE | 2.6 km | MPC · JPL |
| 352927 | 2008 YG_{171} | — | December 28, 2008 | Socorro | LINEAR | · | 1.0 km | MPC · JPL |
| 352928 | 2009 AK_{2} | — | January 6, 2009 | Great Shefford | Birtwhistle, P. | · | 1.5 km | MPC · JPL |
| 352929 | 2009 AK_{13} | — | January 2, 2009 | Mount Lemmon | Mount Lemmon Survey | (5) | 1.2 km | MPC · JPL |
| 352930 | 2009 AA_{25} | — | January 3, 2009 | Kitt Peak | Spacewatch | (5) | 1.1 km | MPC · JPL |
| 352931 | 2009 AR_{26} | — | January 2, 2009 | Kitt Peak | Spacewatch | · | 1.7 km | MPC · JPL |
| 352932 | 2009 AX_{27} | — | January 2, 2009 | Kitt Peak | Spacewatch | (11882) | 2.0 km | MPC · JPL |
| 352933 | 2009 AU_{28} | — | January 8, 2009 | Kitt Peak | Spacewatch | · | 2.6 km | MPC · JPL |
| 352934 | 2009 AJ_{30} | — | January 1, 2009 | Kitt Peak | Spacewatch | · | 2.1 km | MPC · JPL |
| 352935 | 2009 AJ_{33} | — | January 15, 2009 | Kitt Peak | Spacewatch | · | 1.5 km | MPC · JPL |
| 352936 | 2009 AG_{36} | — | January 15, 2009 | Kitt Peak | Spacewatch | · | 890 m | MPC · JPL |
| 352937 | 2009 AM_{36} | — | January 15, 2009 | Kitt Peak | Spacewatch | · | 1.2 km | MPC · JPL |
| 352938 | 2009 AJ_{44} | — | January 3, 2009 | Mount Lemmon | Mount Lemmon Survey | · | 1.6 km | MPC · JPL |
| 352939 | 2009 AY_{44} | — | January 2, 2009 | Catalina | CSS | · | 1.8 km | MPC · JPL |
| 352940 | 2009 AJ_{45} | — | January 15, 2009 | Kitt Peak | Spacewatch | · | 1.7 km | MPC · JPL |
| 352941 | 2009 AL_{45} | — | January 15, 2009 | Kitt Peak | Spacewatch | · | 870 m | MPC · JPL |
| 352942 | 2009 AT_{49} | — | December 20, 2004 | Mount Lemmon | Mount Lemmon Survey | (5) | 1.1 km | MPC · JPL |
| 352943 | 2009 BB_{7} | — | November 23, 2008 | Mount Lemmon | Mount Lemmon Survey | (194) | 2.1 km | MPC · JPL |
| 352944 | 2009 BS_{7} | — | May 2, 2006 | Mount Lemmon | Mount Lemmon Survey | · | 1.3 km | MPC · JPL |
| 352945 | 2009 BL_{10} | — | January 21, 2009 | Tzec Maun | E. Schwab | · | 1.7 km | MPC · JPL |
| 352946 | 2009 BP_{11} | — | January 20, 2009 | Socorro | LINEAR | · | 2.3 km | MPC · JPL |
| 352947 | 2009 BU_{12} | — | January 21, 2009 | Socorro | LINEAR | HNS | 1.5 km | MPC · JPL |
| 352948 | 2009 BM_{13} | — | January 22, 2009 | Socorro | LINEAR | · | 4.0 km | MPC · JPL |
| 352949 | 2009 BJ_{15} | — | January 16, 2009 | Mount Lemmon | Mount Lemmon Survey | · | 1.2 km | MPC · JPL |
| 352950 | 2009 BA_{17} | — | January 17, 2009 | Catalina | CSS | EUN | 1.3 km | MPC · JPL |
| 352951 | 2009 BC_{20} | — | January 16, 2009 | Mount Lemmon | Mount Lemmon Survey | · | 1.2 km | MPC · JPL |
| 352952 | 2009 BU_{22} | — | January 1, 2009 | Mount Lemmon | Mount Lemmon Survey | · | 1.4 km | MPC · JPL |
| 352953 | 2009 BA_{24} | — | November 2, 2007 | Catalina | CSS | · | 2.5 km | MPC · JPL |
| 352954 | 2009 BB_{24} | — | January 17, 2009 | Kitt Peak | Spacewatch | (5) | 1.2 km | MPC · JPL |
| 352955 | 2009 BS_{27} | — | January 16, 2009 | Kitt Peak | Spacewatch | · | 1.1 km | MPC · JPL |
| 352956 | 2009 BJ_{35} | — | January 16, 2009 | Kitt Peak | Spacewatch | · | 2.1 km | MPC · JPL |
| 352957 | 2009 BM_{35} | — | January 16, 2009 | Kitt Peak | Spacewatch | · | 1.4 km | MPC · JPL |
| 352958 | 2009 BC_{36} | — | January 16, 2009 | Kitt Peak | Spacewatch | · | 1.7 km | MPC · JPL |
| 352959 | 2009 BP_{38} | — | January 16, 2009 | Kitt Peak | Spacewatch | · | 1.4 km | MPC · JPL |
| 352960 | 2009 BT_{40} | — | January 16, 2009 | Kitt Peak | Spacewatch | · | 1.1 km | MPC · JPL |
| 352961 | 2009 BE_{41} | — | January 16, 2009 | Kitt Peak | Spacewatch | · | 1.6 km | MPC · JPL |
| 352962 | 2009 BX_{45} | — | January 16, 2009 | Kitt Peak | Spacewatch | · | 1.6 km | MPC · JPL |
| 352963 | 2009 BA_{46} | — | January 16, 2009 | Kitt Peak | Spacewatch | · | 1.5 km | MPC · JPL |
| 352964 | 2009 BG_{48} | — | January 16, 2009 | Mount Lemmon | Mount Lemmon Survey | · | 1.3 km | MPC · JPL |
| 352965 | 2009 BN_{48} | — | January 16, 2009 | Kitt Peak | Spacewatch | (5) | 1.0 km | MPC · JPL |
| 352966 | 2009 BS_{48} | — | January 16, 2009 | Kitt Peak | Spacewatch | JUN | 970 m | MPC · JPL |
| 352967 | 2009 BG_{49} | — | January 16, 2009 | Mount Lemmon | Mount Lemmon Survey | (5) | 1.0 km | MPC · JPL |
| 352968 | 2009 BN_{54} | — | January 16, 2009 | Mount Lemmon | Mount Lemmon Survey | · | 1.1 km | MPC · JPL |
| 352969 | 2009 BQ_{54} | — | January 16, 2009 | Mount Lemmon | Mount Lemmon Survey | · | 1.8 km | MPC · JPL |
| 352970 | 2009 BF_{59} | — | January 16, 2009 | Mount Lemmon | Mount Lemmon Survey | · | 1.6 km | MPC · JPL |
| 352971 | 2009 BV_{61} | — | January 18, 2009 | Mount Lemmon | Mount Lemmon Survey | · | 1.9 km | MPC · JPL |
| 352972 | 2009 BG_{64} | — | January 20, 2009 | Catalina | CSS | · | 2.0 km | MPC · JPL |
| 352973 | 2009 BS_{64} | — | January 20, 2009 | Catalina | CSS | · | 1.6 km | MPC · JPL |
| 352974 | 2009 BV_{65} | — | January 20, 2009 | Kitt Peak | Spacewatch | · | 910 m | MPC · JPL |
| 352975 | 2009 BA_{67} | — | January 20, 2009 | Kitt Peak | Spacewatch | · | 1.8 km | MPC · JPL |
| 352976 | 2009 BB_{67} | — | January 20, 2009 | Kitt Peak | Spacewatch | · | 1.9 km | MPC · JPL |
| 352977 | 2009 BK_{67} | — | January 20, 2009 | Kitt Peak | Spacewatch | · | 1.1 km | MPC · JPL |
| 352978 | 2009 BA_{75} | — | November 21, 2008 | Catalina | CSS | · | 2.0 km | MPC · JPL |
| 352979 | 2009 BJ_{75} | — | January 21, 2009 | Catalina | CSS | · | 1.9 km | MPC · JPL |
| 352980 | 2009 BP_{75} | — | January 23, 2009 | Purple Mountain | PMO NEO Survey Program | · | 1.5 km | MPC · JPL |
| 352981 | 2009 BQ_{76} | — | January 27, 2009 | Purple Mountain | PMO NEO Survey Program | · | 2.0 km | MPC · JPL |
| 352982 | 2009 BO_{79} | — | January 30, 2009 | Socorro | LINEAR | · | 2.3 km | MPC · JPL |
| 352983 | 2009 BP_{82} | — | January 20, 2009 | Catalina | CSS | (5) | 1.7 km | MPC · JPL |
| 352984 | 2009 BN_{93} | — | January 25, 2009 | Kitt Peak | Spacewatch | (5) | 1.1 km | MPC · JPL |
| 352985 | 2009 BG_{95} | — | January 26, 2009 | Mount Lemmon | Mount Lemmon Survey | · | 1.2 km | MPC · JPL |
| 352986 | 2009 BA_{99} | — | January 26, 2009 | Purple Mountain | PMO NEO Survey Program | · | 1.7 km | MPC · JPL |
| 352987 | 2009 BY_{99} | — | January 28, 2009 | Catalina | CSS | · | 2.4 km | MPC · JPL |
| 352988 | 2009 BF_{101} | — | January 29, 2009 | Catalina | CSS | · | 2.1 km | MPC · JPL |
| 352989 | 2009 BG_{103} | — | January 30, 2009 | Siding Spring | SSS | · | 1.8 km | MPC · JPL |
| 352990 | 2009 BV_{103} | — | January 25, 2009 | Kitt Peak | Spacewatch | · | 1.4 km | MPC · JPL |
| 352991 | 2009 BU_{104} | — | January 25, 2009 | Kitt Peak | Spacewatch | (1547) | 1.6 km | MPC · JPL |
| 352992 | 2009 BN_{108} | — | January 29, 2009 | Mount Lemmon | Mount Lemmon Survey | · | 2.0 km | MPC · JPL |
| 352993 | 2009 BR_{108} | — | January 29, 2009 | Mount Lemmon | Mount Lemmon Survey | · | 1.6 km | MPC · JPL |
| 352994 | 2009 BO_{111} | — | January 28, 2009 | Catalina | CSS | · | 4.3 km | MPC · JPL |
| 352995 | 2009 BZ_{111} | — | January 29, 2009 | Kitt Peak | Spacewatch | · | 2.4 km | MPC · JPL |
| 352996 | 2009 BV_{112} | — | January 31, 2009 | Mount Lemmon | Mount Lemmon Survey | BRA | 1.5 km | MPC · JPL |
| 352997 | 2009 BM_{116} | — | January 29, 2009 | Kitt Peak | Spacewatch | · | 1.2 km | MPC · JPL |
| 352998 | 2009 BC_{121} | — | January 31, 2009 | Kitt Peak | Spacewatch | JUN | 1.6 km | MPC · JPL |
| 352999 | 2009 BL_{125} | — | January 31, 2009 | Kitt Peak | Spacewatch | · | 1.7 km | MPC · JPL |
| 353000 | 2009 BQ_{125} | — | January 28, 2009 | Kitt Peak | Spacewatch | (5) | 1.3 km | MPC · JPL |

back to top

== See also ==
- Meanings of minor-planet names: 352001–353000
