= Meanings of minor-planet names: 352001–353000 =

As minor planet discoveries are confirmed, they are given a permanent number by the IAU's Minor Planet Center (MPC), and the discoverers can then submit names for them, following the IAU's naming conventions. The list below concerns those minor planets in the specified number-range that have received names, and explains the meanings of those names.

Official naming citations of newly named small Solar System bodies are approved and published in a bulletin by IAU's Working Group for Small Bodies Nomenclature (WGSBN). Before May 2021, citations were published in MPC's Minor Planet Circulars for many decades. Recent citations can also be found on the JPL Small-Body Database (SBDB). Until his death in 2016, German astronomer Lutz D. Schmadel compiled these citations into the Dictionary of Minor Planet Names (DMP) and regularly updated the collection.

Based on Paul Herget's The Names of the Minor Planets, Schmadel also researched the unclear origin of numerous asteroids, most of which had been named prior to World War II. This article incorporates text from this source, which is in the public domain: SBDB New namings may only be added to this list below after official publication as the preannouncement of names is condemned. The WGSBN publishes a comprehensive guideline for the naming rules of non-cometary small Solar System bodies.

== 352001–352100 ==
Named minor planet	Provisional	This minor planet was named for...	Ref · Catalog
352017 Juvarra	2006 VR_{13}	Filippo Juvarra (1678–1736) was an Italian architect in the late-Baroque, who designed the Basilica of Superga near Turin in 1731.	IAU · 352017

== 352101–352200 ==
back to top

Named minor planet	Provisional	This minor planet was named for...	Ref · Catalog
352148 Tarcisiozani	2007 PH	Tarcisio Zani, an Italian designer of steel products and an amateur astronomer	JPL · 352148

== 352201–352300 ==
back to top

Named minor planet	Provisional	This minor planet was named for...	Ref · Catalog
352214 Szczecin	2007 TY_{4}	The Polish town of Szczecin (Stettin), located on the river Odra in northwestern Poland, was the birthplace of astrophysicist Aleksander Wolszczan.	IAU · 352214
352273 Turrell	2007 TF_{298}	James Turrell (born 1943) an American artist, known for his work within the Light and Space movement. Turrell is working on Roden Crater, a volcanic cone located outside Flagstaff, Arizona, to be turned into a massive naked-eye observatory.	IAU · 352273

== 352301–352400 ==
back to top

Named minor planet	Provisional	This minor planet was named for...	Ref · Catalog
352333 Sylvievauclair	2007 VV	Sylvie Vauclair (born 1946), a French astrophysicist at the Institut de Recherche en Astrophysique et Planétologie	JPL · 352333

== 352401–352500 ==
back to top

Named minor planet	Provisional	This minor planet was named for...	Ref · Catalog
There are no named minor planets in this number range

== 352501–352600 ==
back to top

Named minor planet	Provisional	This minor planet was named for...	Ref · Catalog
There are no named minor planets in this number range

== 352601–352700 ==
back to top

Named minor planet	Provisional	This minor planet was named for...	Ref · Catalog
352646 Blumbahs	2008 OZ_{1}	Fricis Blumbahs (1864–1949), a Latvian astronomer and meteorologist	JPL · 352646
352655 Alekna	2008 QX_{28}	Mykolas Alekna, Lithuanian athlete.	IAU · 352655

== 352701–352800 ==
back to top

Named minor planet	Provisional	This minor planet was named for...	Ref · Catalog
352704 Stevefleming	2008 SW_{151}	Steve Fleming (1974–2017) was a principal of Vernon High School in Vernon, Texas.	IAU · 352704
352760 Tesorero	2008 UR_{4}	Pico Tesorero, a prominent pyramidal peak located in the central massif of Picos de Europa in Spain	JPL · 352760
352782 Karelschrijver	2008 UE_{97}	Carolus (Karel) Schrijver (1958–2024), Lockheed Martin Senior Fellow, was a Dutch astrophysicist, writer, and science communicator.	IAU · 352782

== 352801–352900 ==
back to top

Named minor planet	Provisional	This minor planet was named for...	Ref · Catalog
352834 Málaga	2008 VN_{4}	Málaga is a city in southern Spain. It is an important cultural and cosmopolitan center in Andalusia. Málaga was founded by the Phoenicians in the 8th century BCE.	JPL · 352834
352860 Monflier	2008 WY_{96}	Bruno Monflier (born 1947), an active promoter of scientific outreach in astronomy in France and abroad.	JPL · 352860

== 352901–353000 ==
back to top

Named minor planet	Provisional	This minor planet was named for...	Ref · Catalog
There are no named minor planets in this number range

back to top

Preceded by 351,001–352,000	Meanings of minor-planet names List of minor planets: 352,001–353,000	Succeeded by 353,001–354,000
