= List of minor planets: 351001–352000 =

The following is a partial list of minor planets, running from minor-planet number 351001 through 352000, inclusive. The primary data for this and other partial lists is based on JPL's "Small-Body Orbital Elements" and data available from the Minor Planet Center. Critical list information is also provided by the MPC, unless otherwise specified from Lowell Observatory. A detailed description of the table's columns and additional sources are given on the main page including a complete list of every page in this series, and a statistical break-up on the dynamical classification of minor planets.

Also see the summary list of all named bodies in numerical and alphabetical order, and the corresponding naming citations for the number range of this particular list. New namings may only be added to this list after official publication, as the preannouncement of names is condemned by the Working Group for Small Bodies Nomenclature of the International Astronomical Union.

Near-Earth obj.	MBA (inner)	MBA (outer)	Centaur
Mars-crosser	MBA (middle)	Jupiter trojan	Trans-Neptunian obj.
Unclassified

== 351001–351100 ==
Designation			Discovery			Properties		Ref
Permanent	Provisional	Named after	Date	Site	Discoverer(s)	Category	Diam.	Ref
351001	2003 HM_{42}	—	April 28, 2003	Socorro	LINEAR	·	2.0 km	MPC · JPL
351002	2003 HJ_{44}	—	April 27, 2003	Anderson Mesa	LONEOS	·	1.0 km	MPC · JPL
351003	2003 JC	—	May 1, 2003	Kitt Peak	Spacewatch	H	560 m	MPC · JPL
351004	2003 JE_{13}	—	May 3, 2003	Haleakala	NEAT	·	1.1 km	MPC · JPL
351005	2003 KH_{4}	—	May 25, 2003	Kitt Peak	Spacewatch	H	680 m	MPC · JPL
351006	2003 KX_{7}	—	May 23, 2003	Kitt Peak	Spacewatch	·	2.6 km	MPC · JPL
351007	2003 MT_{1}	—	June 21, 2003	Anderson Mesa	LONEOS	·	1.9 km	MPC · JPL
351008	2003 OZ_{27}	—	July 24, 2003	Palomar	NEAT	·	1.7 km	MPC · JPL
351009	2003 PQ_{1}	—	August 1, 2003	Haleakala	NEAT	·	1.3 km	MPC · JPL
351010	2003 QA_{28}	—	August 20, 2003	Palomar	NEAT	EUN	1.3 km	MPC · JPL
351011	2003 QX_{34}	—	August 22, 2003	Socorro	LINEAR	·	1.9 km	MPC · JPL
351012	2003 QF_{43}	—	August 22, 2003	Palomar	NEAT	·	1.2 km	MPC · JPL
351013	2003 QK_{52}	—	August 23, 2003	Socorro	LINEAR	·	1.2 km	MPC · JPL
351014	2003 QR_{55}	—	August 23, 2003	Socorro	LINEAR	BRG	1.6 km	MPC · JPL
351015	2003 QS_{71}	—	July 28, 2003	Palomar	NEAT	·	2.6 km	MPC · JPL
351016	2003 QM_{78}	—	August 24, 2003	Socorro	LINEAR	·	2.2 km	MPC · JPL
351017	2003 RZ_{4}	—	September 3, 2003	Haleakala	NEAT	·	1.6 km	MPC · JPL
351018	2003 RU_{18}	—	September 15, 2003	Anderson Mesa	LONEOS	·	1.6 km	MPC · JPL
351019	2003 RK_{20}	—	September 15, 2003	Anderson Mesa	LONEOS	·	1.5 km	MPC · JPL
351020	2003 SJ_{9}	—	September 17, 2003	Palomar	NEAT	KON	2.6 km	MPC · JPL
351021	2003 SK_{10}	—	September 17, 2003	Kitt Peak	Spacewatch	·	1.2 km	MPC · JPL
351022	2003 SV_{11}	—	September 2, 2003	Socorro	LINEAR	MAR	1.5 km	MPC · JPL
351023	2003 SH_{38}	—	September 16, 2003	Palomar	NEAT	·	1.8 km	MPC · JPL
351024	2003 SF_{40}	—	September 16, 2003	Palomar	NEAT	·	1.8 km	MPC · JPL
351025	2003 SW_{41}	—	September 17, 2003	Palomar	NEAT	·	1.9 km	MPC · JPL
351026	2003 SF_{53}	—	September 19, 2003	Palomar	NEAT	·	1.3 km	MPC · JPL
351027	2003 SS_{55}	—	September 16, 2003	Anderson Mesa	LONEOS	·	1.6 km	MPC · JPL
351028	2003 SX_{77}	—	September 19, 2003	Kitt Peak	Spacewatch	·	1.5 km	MPC · JPL
351029	2003 SP_{92}	—	September 18, 2003	Kitt Peak	Spacewatch	·	1.3 km	MPC · JPL
351030	2003 SD_{107}	—	September 20, 2003	Palomar	NEAT	·	3.6 km	MPC · JPL
351031	2003 SG_{111}	—	September 17, 2003	Palomar	NEAT	(1547)	1.7 km	MPC · JPL
351032	2003 SN_{125}	—	September 19, 2003	Socorro	LINEAR	·	1.5 km	MPC · JPL
351033	2003 SY_{129}	—	September 20, 2003	Kitt Peak	Spacewatch	BAR	1.6 km	MPC · JPL
351034	2003 SS_{145}	—	September 20, 2003	Palomar	NEAT	·	2.3 km	MPC · JPL
351035	2003 SP_{148}	—	September 16, 2003	Kitt Peak	Spacewatch	·	1.4 km	MPC · JPL
351036	2003 SM_{157}	—	September 5, 2003	Bergisch Gladbach	W. Bickel	T_{j} (2.96)	4.6 km	MPC · JPL
351037	2003 SH_{165}	—	September 20, 2003	Anderson Mesa	LONEOS	RAF	1.1 km	MPC · JPL
351038	2003 SY_{167}	—	September 23, 2003	Haleakala	NEAT	·	1.4 km	MPC · JPL
351039	2003 SB_{170}	—	September 22, 2003	Palomar	NEAT	·	1.5 km	MPC · JPL
351040	2003 SC_{170}	—	September 22, 2003	Piszkéstető	K. Sárneczky, B. Sipőcz	·	1.7 km	MPC · JPL
351041	2003 SU_{193}	—	September 20, 2003	Kitt Peak	Spacewatch	·	1.2 km	MPC · JPL
351042	2003 SX_{196}	—	September 16, 2003	Palomar	NEAT	ADE	2.1 km	MPC · JPL
351043	2003 SL_{207}	—	September 21, 2003	Campo Imperatore	CINEOS	T_{j} (2.96) · HIL	5.3 km	MPC · JPL
351044	2003 SM_{208}	—	September 23, 2003	Palomar	NEAT	·	1.5 km	MPC · JPL
351045	2003 SU_{226}	—	September 26, 2003	Socorro	LINEAR	·	1.9 km	MPC · JPL
351046	2003 SR_{227}	—	September 27, 2003	Socorro	LINEAR	T_{j} (2.97) · 3:2	5.2 km	MPC · JPL
351047	2003 ST_{228}	—	September 26, 2003	Socorro	LINEAR	·	1.4 km	MPC · JPL
351048	2003 SQ_{240}	—	September 27, 2003	Kitt Peak	Spacewatch	·	1.1 km	MPC · JPL
351049	2003 SN_{244}	—	September 25, 2003	Haleakala	NEAT	·	1.4 km	MPC · JPL
351050	2003 SG_{248}	—	September 26, 2003	Socorro	LINEAR	(5)	1.3 km	MPC · JPL
351051	2003 SM_{248}	—	September 26, 2003	Socorro	LINEAR	·	1.8 km	MPC · JPL
351052	2003 SU_{254}	—	September 27, 2003	Kitt Peak	Spacewatch	·	1.9 km	MPC · JPL
351053	2003 SM_{255}	—	September 27, 2003	Kitt Peak	Spacewatch	·	1.4 km	MPC · JPL
351054	2003 SW_{259}	—	September 28, 2003	Kitt Peak	Spacewatch	·	1.7 km	MPC · JPL
351055	2003 SV_{273}	—	August 25, 2003	Socorro	LINEAR	·	1.9 km	MPC · JPL
351056	2003 SP_{278}	—	September 30, 2003	Socorro	LINEAR	MAR	1.4 km	MPC · JPL
351057	2003 SA_{291}	—	September 29, 2003	Socorro	LINEAR	·	1.5 km	MPC · JPL
351058	2003 SH_{296}	—	September 29, 2003	Anderson Mesa	LONEOS	·	1.3 km	MPC · JPL
351059	2003 SK_{299}	—	September 29, 2003	Anderson Mesa	LONEOS	(1547)	1.8 km	MPC · JPL
351060	2003 SW_{301}	—	September 20, 2003	Kitt Peak	Spacewatch	·	1.5 km	MPC · JPL
351061	2003 SS_{324}	—	September 17, 2003	Kitt Peak	Spacewatch	·	1.9 km	MPC · JPL
351062	2003 SO_{335}	—	September 26, 2003	Apache Point	SDSS	·	1.4 km	MPC · JPL
351063	2003 SG_{393}	—	September 26, 2003	Apache Point	SDSS	·	1.3 km	MPC · JPL
351064	2003 SQ_{401}	—	September 26, 2003	Apache Point	SDSS	HNS	1.3 km	MPC · JPL
351065	2003 SX_{405}	—	September 27, 2003	Apache Point	SDSS	EUN	1.5 km	MPC · JPL
351066	2003 SJ_{428}	—	September 17, 2003	Kitt Peak	Spacewatch	·	1.7 km	MPC · JPL
351067	2003 SG_{430}	—	September 30, 2003	Kitt Peak	Spacewatch	·	1.6 km	MPC · JPL
351068	2003 TS_{13}	—	October 5, 2003	Kitt Peak	Spacewatch	·	2.5 km	MPC · JPL
351069	2003 TY_{26}	—	October 1, 2003	Kitt Peak	Spacewatch	EUN	1.5 km	MPC · JPL
351070	2003 TE_{59}	—	October 15, 2003	Anderson Mesa	LONEOS	·	1.8 km	MPC · JPL
351071	2003 UY_{8}	—	October 16, 2003	Socorro	LINEAR	H	680 m	MPC · JPL
351072	2003 UF_{11}	—	October 16, 2003	Anderson Mesa	LONEOS	H	890 m	MPC · JPL
351073	2003 UR_{11}	—	October 20, 2003	Socorro	LINEAR	BAR	1.3 km	MPC · JPL
351074	2003 UW_{40}	—	October 16, 2003	Anderson Mesa	LONEOS	·	2.1 km	MPC · JPL
351075	2003 UN_{51}	—	October 18, 2003	Palomar	NEAT	·	1.3 km	MPC · JPL
351076	2003 UT_{51}	—	October 18, 2003	Palomar	NEAT	EUN	1.2 km	MPC · JPL
351077	2003 UU_{53}	—	October 18, 2003	Palomar	NEAT	T_{j} (2.94) · HIL	5.2 km	MPC · JPL
351078	2003 UH_{55}	—	October 18, 2003	Palomar	NEAT	·	1.6 km	MPC · JPL
351079	2003 US_{59}	—	October 17, 2003	Anderson Mesa	LONEOS	·	1.5 km	MPC · JPL
351080	2003 UF_{65}	—	October 16, 2003	Palomar	NEAT	KON	2.8 km	MPC · JPL
351081	2003 UE_{77}	—	October 17, 2003	Kitt Peak	Spacewatch	·	1.4 km	MPC · JPL
351082	2003 UC_{83}	—	October 16, 2003	Anderson Mesa	LONEOS	·	1.5 km	MPC · JPL
351083	2003 UR_{86}	—	October 18, 2003	Palomar	NEAT	·	2.0 km	MPC · JPL
351084	2003 UT_{106}	—	October 18, 2003	Palomar	NEAT	EUN	1.4 km	MPC · JPL
351085	2003 UG_{112}	—	October 20, 2003	Socorro	LINEAR	·	1.9 km	MPC · JPL
351086	2003 UC_{122}	—	October 19, 2003	Anderson Mesa	LONEOS	·	2.1 km	MPC · JPL
351087	2003 UX_{125}	—	October 20, 2003	Kitt Peak	Spacewatch	·	1.5 km	MPC · JPL
351088	2003 UH_{137}	—	September 22, 2003	Palomar	NEAT	·	1.7 km	MPC · JPL
351089	2003 UH_{172}	—	October 3, 2003	Kitt Peak	Spacewatch	·	1.4 km	MPC · JPL
351090	2003 UV_{174}	—	October 21, 2003	Kitt Peak	Spacewatch	·	1.3 km	MPC · JPL
351091	2003 UC_{178}	—	October 21, 2003	Palomar	NEAT	(5)	1.0 km	MPC · JPL
351092	2003 UF_{204}	—	October 21, 2003	Kitt Peak	Spacewatch	·	1.0 km	MPC · JPL
351093	2003 UW_{207}	—	October 22, 2003	Kitt Peak	Spacewatch	·	1.8 km	MPC · JPL
351094	2003 UR_{223}	—	October 22, 2003	Socorro	LINEAR	·	2.0 km	MPC · JPL
351095	2003 UO_{241}	—	October 24, 2003	Socorro	LINEAR	·	1.1 km	MPC · JPL
351096	2003 UT_{243}	—	October 24, 2003	Socorro	LINEAR	·	1.5 km	MPC · JPL
351097	2003 UM_{246}	—	October 24, 2003	Socorro	LINEAR	·	1.9 km	MPC · JPL
351098	2003 UV_{247}	—	October 24, 2003	Haleakala	NEAT	·	2.4 km	MPC · JPL
351099	2003 UZ_{248}	—	October 25, 2003	Socorro	LINEAR	HNS	1.2 km	MPC · JPL
351100	2003 UZ_{251}	—	October 26, 2003	Catalina	CSS	·	2.6 km	MPC · JPL

== 351101–351200 ==
back to top

Designation			Discovery			Properties		Ref
Permanent	Provisional	Named after	Date	Site	Discoverer(s)	Category	Diam.	Ref
351101	2003 UU_{263}	—	October 27, 2003	Socorro	LINEAR	·	1.1 km	MPC · JPL
351102	2003 UW_{267}	—	October 28, 2003	Socorro	LINEAR	·	1.6 km	MPC · JPL
351103	2003 UC_{272}	—	October 28, 2003	Socorro	LINEAR	T_{j} (2.99) · 3:2 · SHU	4.7 km	MPC · JPL
351104	2003 UP_{282}	—	October 21, 2003	Socorro	LINEAR	·	2.1 km	MPC · JPL
351105	2003 UT_{317}	—	October 17, 2003	Apache Point	SDSS	·	1.0 km	MPC · JPL
351106	2003 UH_{318}	—	October 16, 2003	Palomar	NEAT	·	1.4 km	MPC · JPL
351107	2003 UX_{325}	—	October 17, 2003	Apache Point	SDSS	·	1.5 km	MPC · JPL
351108	2003 UL_{334}	—	October 18, 2003	Apache Point	SDSS	(5)	1.2 km	MPC · JPL
351109	2003 UX_{347}	—	October 19, 2003	Apache Point	SDSS	(5)	1.3 km	MPC · JPL
351110	2003 UX_{352}	—	October 19, 2003	Apache Point	SDSS	·	1.2 km	MPC · JPL
351111	2003 UK_{354}	—	October 19, 2003	Apache Point	SDSS	(5)	1.2 km	MPC · JPL
351112	2003 UG_{378}	—	October 22, 2003	Apache Point	SDSS	·	3.7 km	MPC · JPL
351113	2003 UC_{390}	—	October 22, 2003	Apache Point	SDSS	·	1.2 km	MPC · JPL
351114	2003 UT_{393}	—	October 22, 2003	Kitt Peak	M. W. Buie	·	1.1 km	MPC · JPL
351115	2003 VN_{2}	—	November 14, 2003	Palomar	NEAT	·	2.2 km	MPC · JPL
351116	2003 VV_{8}	—	November 15, 2003	Kitt Peak	Spacewatch	·	2.4 km	MPC · JPL
351117	2003 WR_{2}	—	November 16, 2003	Kitt Peak	Spacewatch	·	2.3 km	MPC · JPL
351118	2003 WE_{3}	—	October 19, 2003	Kitt Peak	Spacewatch	·	1.4 km	MPC · JPL
351119	2003 WT_{16}	—	November 18, 2003	Palomar	NEAT	·	3.4 km	MPC · JPL
351120	2003 WQ_{30}	—	November 18, 2003	Kitt Peak	Spacewatch	·	1.4 km	MPC · JPL
351121	2003 WE_{66}	—	November 19, 2003	Socorro	LINEAR	·	3.4 km	MPC · JPL
351122	2003 WA_{73}	—	November 20, 2003	Socorro	LINEAR	·	1.9 km	MPC · JPL
351123	2003 WE_{73}	—	November 20, 2003	Socorro	LINEAR	·	2.1 km	MPC · JPL
351124	2003 WJ_{80}	—	November 20, 2003	Socorro	LINEAR	WIT	1.2 km	MPC · JPL
351125	2003 WR_{82}	—	November 19, 2003	Palomar	NEAT	(194)	2.2 km	MPC · JPL
351126	2003 WF_{83}	—	November 20, 2003	Socorro	LINEAR	·	3.2 km	MPC · JPL
351127	2003 WZ_{85}	—	November 20, 2003	Socorro	LINEAR	·	2.9 km	MPC · JPL
351128	2003 WP_{86}	—	November 21, 2003	Socorro	LINEAR	·	1.8 km	MPC · JPL
351129	2003 WS_{92}	—	November 19, 2003	Anderson Mesa	LONEOS	(5)	1.4 km	MPC · JPL
351130	2003 WO_{101}	—	November 21, 2003	Catalina	CSS	·	1.6 km	MPC · JPL
351131	2003 WL_{112}	—	November 14, 2003	Palomar	NEAT	·	1.2 km	MPC · JPL
351132	2003 WP_{112}	—	November 20, 2003	Socorro	LINEAR	·	1.6 km	MPC · JPL
351133	2003 WY_{112}	—	November 20, 2003	Socorro	LINEAR	EUN	1.5 km	MPC · JPL
351134	2003 WK_{113}	—	November 20, 2003	Socorro	LINEAR	·	2.2 km	MPC · JPL
351135	2003 WX_{131}	—	November 19, 2003	Kitt Peak	Spacewatch	·	1.4 km	MPC · JPL
351136	2003 WM_{142}	—	November 21, 2003	Socorro	LINEAR	JUN	1.6 km	MPC · JPL
351137	2003 WE_{150}	—	November 24, 2003	Anderson Mesa	LONEOS	EUN ·	4.0 km	MPC · JPL
351138	2003 WX_{152}	—	November 26, 2003	Socorro	LINEAR	·	3.4 km	MPC · JPL
351139	2003 WX_{160}	—	November 30, 2003	Kitt Peak	Spacewatch	·	1.1 km	MPC · JPL
351140	2003 WB_{168}	—	November 19, 2003	Palomar	NEAT	·	1.8 km	MPC · JPL
351141	2003 WT_{170}	—	November 21, 2003	Catalina	CSS	·	1.6 km	MPC · JPL
351142	2003 XX_{15}	—	December 14, 2003	Kitt Peak	Spacewatch	·	3.2 km	MPC · JPL
351143	2003 XX_{22}	—	December 1, 2003	Kitt Peak	Spacewatch	·	1.6 km	MPC · JPL
351144	2003 XM_{36}	—	December 3, 2003	Socorro	LINEAR	·	2.3 km	MPC · JPL
351145	2003 YR_{13}	—	December 17, 2003	Needville	J. Dellinger, W. G. Dillon	MIS	2.7 km	MPC · JPL
351146	2003 YB_{15}	—	December 17, 2003	Socorro	LINEAR	·	1.8 km	MPC · JPL
351147	2003 YY_{19}	—	December 17, 2003	Kitt Peak	Spacewatch	·	4.2 km	MPC · JPL
351148	2003 YG_{28}	—	December 17, 2003	Palomar	NEAT	EUN	1.5 km	MPC · JPL
351149	2003 YE_{31}	—	December 18, 2003	Socorro	LINEAR	JUN	1.5 km	MPC · JPL
351150	2003 YO_{44}	—	December 19, 2003	Kitt Peak	Spacewatch	·	1.7 km	MPC · JPL
351151	2003 YC_{48}	—	December 18, 2003	Socorro	LINEAR	·	2.4 km	MPC · JPL
351152	2003 YD_{52}	—	December 18, 2003	Socorro	LINEAR	ADE	2.9 km	MPC · JPL
351153	2003 YE_{55}	—	December 19, 2003	Socorro	LINEAR	·	1.4 km	MPC · JPL
351154	2003 YJ_{80}	—	December 18, 2003	Socorro	LINEAR	·	2.2 km	MPC · JPL
351155	2003 YJ_{106}	—	December 22, 2003	Socorro	LINEAR	·	2.6 km	MPC · JPL
351156	2003 YF_{133}	—	December 28, 2003	Socorro	LINEAR	·	3.3 km	MPC · JPL
351157	2003 YW_{149}	—	December 29, 2003	Socorro	LINEAR	(1547)	2.4 km	MPC · JPL
351158	2003 YX_{160}	—	December 17, 2003	Kitt Peak	Spacewatch	·	1.4 km	MPC · JPL
351159	2003 YF_{167}	—	December 17, 2003	Kitt Peak	Spacewatch	·	2.9 km	MPC · JPL
351160	2003 YL_{169}	—	December 18, 2003	Socorro	LINEAR	·	2.5 km	MPC · JPL
351161	2003 YT_{173}	—	December 19, 2003	Kitt Peak	Spacewatch	·	1.7 km	MPC · JPL
351162	2003 YJ_{181}	—	December 23, 2003	Socorro	LINEAR	·	2.5 km	MPC · JPL
351163	2004 AO_{6}	—	January 15, 2004	Kitt Peak	Spacewatch	·	1.8 km	MPC · JPL
351164	2004 AL_{12}	—	January 13, 2004	Kitt Peak	Spacewatch	AEO	1.2 km	MPC · JPL
351165	2004 AG_{19}	—	January 15, 2004	Kitt Peak	Spacewatch	·	1.5 km	MPC · JPL
351166	2004 BQ_{2}	—	January 16, 2004	Palomar	NEAT	·	2.8 km	MPC · JPL
351167	2004 BQ_{3}	—	January 16, 2004	Palomar	NEAT	(21344)	1.9 km	MPC · JPL
351168	2004 BE_{5}	—	January 16, 2004	Palomar	NEAT	JUN	1.1 km	MPC · JPL
351169	2004 BO_{11}	—	January 16, 2004	Palomar	NEAT	(13314)	2.1 km	MPC · JPL
351170	2004 BH_{14}	—	January 18, 2004	Pla D'Arguines	D'Arguines, Pla	(32418)	2.5 km	MPC · JPL
351171	2004 BX_{22}	—	January 17, 2004	Palomar	NEAT	·	2.0 km	MPC · JPL
351172	2004 BO_{29}	—	January 18, 2004	Palomar	NEAT	·	2.1 km	MPC · JPL
351173	2004 BH_{30}	—	January 18, 2004	Palomar	NEAT	·	2.0 km	MPC · JPL
351174	2004 BE_{52}	—	January 21, 2004	Socorro	LINEAR	CLO	3.0 km	MPC · JPL
351175	2004 BR_{52}	—	January 21, 2004	Socorro	LINEAR	AEO	1.2 km	MPC · JPL
351176	2004 BP_{62}	—	January 22, 2004	Socorro	LINEAR	·	1.4 km	MPC · JPL
351177	2004 BO_{64}	—	January 22, 2004	Socorro	LINEAR	·	2.5 km	MPC · JPL
351178	2004 BM_{67}	—	January 24, 2004	Socorro	LINEAR	·	1.8 km	MPC · JPL
351179	2004 BM_{76}	—	January 24, 2004	Socorro	LINEAR	·	2.2 km	MPC · JPL
351180	2004 BE_{84}	—	January 24, 2004	Socorro	LINEAR	·	2.3 km	MPC · JPL
351181	2004 BB_{98}	—	January 27, 2004	Kitt Peak	Spacewatch	DOR	2.3 km	MPC · JPL
351182	2004 BP_{115}	—	January 30, 2004	Socorro	LINEAR	·	2.0 km	MPC · JPL
351183	2004 BN_{117}	—	January 28, 2004	Catalina	CSS	DOR	3.4 km	MPC · JPL
351184	2004 BJ_{150}	—	January 17, 2004	Palomar	NEAT	·	2.2 km	MPC · JPL
351185	2004 CE_{1}	—	January 19, 2004	Socorro	LINEAR	·	3.4 km	MPC · JPL
351186	2004 CV_{28}	—	February 12, 2004	Kitt Peak	Spacewatch	·	1.6 km	MPC · JPL
351187	2004 CB_{37}	—	February 12, 2004	Palomar	NEAT	·	2.4 km	MPC · JPL
351188	2004 CF_{44}	—	February 12, 2004	Kitt Peak	Spacewatch	AGN	1.3 km	MPC · JPL
351189	2004 CM_{56}	—	February 14, 2004	Haleakala	NEAT	·	3.0 km	MPC · JPL
351190	2004 CE_{67}	—	February 15, 2004	Socorro	LINEAR	·	2.8 km	MPC · JPL
351191	2004 CF_{67}	—	February 15, 2004	Socorro	LINEAR	·	3.5 km	MPC · JPL
351192	2004 CN_{70}	—	February 12, 2004	Kitt Peak	Spacewatch	·	800 m	MPC · JPL
351193	2004 CH_{78}	—	February 11, 2004	Palomar	NEAT	·	2.1 km	MPC · JPL
351194	2004 DH_{23}	—	February 18, 2004	Catalina	CSS	·	3.3 km	MPC · JPL
351195	2004 DK_{24}	—	February 19, 2004	Socorro	LINEAR	·	2.3 km	MPC · JPL
351196	2004 DO_{26}	—	February 16, 2004	Kitt Peak	Spacewatch	MRX	1.3 km	MPC · JPL
351197	2004 DL_{49}	—	February 19, 2004	Socorro	LINEAR	·	2.7 km	MPC · JPL
351198	2004 DD_{52}	—	February 25, 2004	Socorro	LINEAR	·	3.1 km	MPC · JPL
351199	2004 DD_{56}	—	February 12, 2004	Kitt Peak	Spacewatch	·	2.0 km	MPC · JPL
351200	2004 EQ_{69}	—	March 15, 2004	Kitt Peak	Spacewatch	·	2.1 km	MPC · JPL

== 351201–351300 ==
back to top

Designation			Discovery			Properties		Ref
Permanent	Provisional	Named after	Date	Site	Discoverer(s)	Category	Diam.	Ref
351201	2004 FR_{61}	—	March 19, 2004	Socorro	LINEAR	·	2.2 km	MPC · JPL
351202	2004 FL_{116}	—	March 23, 2004	Socorro	LINEAR	·	2.1 km	MPC · JPL
351203	2004 FT_{130}	—	March 22, 2004	Anderson Mesa	LONEOS	·	1.1 km	MPC · JPL
351204	2004 FB_{136}	—	March 27, 2004	Kitt Peak	Spacewatch	·	2.5 km	MPC · JPL
351205	2004 FE_{136}	—	March 27, 2004	Kitt Peak	Spacewatch	EOS	1.9 km	MPC · JPL
351206	2004 GP_{59}	—	April 12, 2004	Siding Spring	SSS	·	3.1 km	MPC · JPL
351207	2004 HL_{30}	—	April 21, 2004	Socorro	LINEAR	·	920 m	MPC · JPL
351208	2004 HB_{47}	—	April 22, 2004	Socorro	LINEAR	·	1.0 km	MPC · JPL
351209	2004 JY_{32}	—	May 15, 2004	Socorro	LINEAR	EUP	4.9 km	MPC · JPL
351210	2004 JD_{40}	—	April 25, 2004	Kitt Peak	Spacewatch	L4	20 km	MPC · JPL
351211	2004 LZ_{7}	—	June 11, 2004	Socorro	LINEAR	·	1.5 km	MPC · JPL
351212	2004 LM_{10}	—	June 8, 2004	Kitt Peak	Spacewatch	T_{j} (2.98)	4.0 km	MPC · JPL
351213	2004 MM_{3}	—	June 18, 2004	Piszkéstető	K. Sárneczky	·	3.6 km	MPC · JPL
351214	2004 ND_{1}	—	July 7, 2004	Campo Imperatore	CINEOS	·	1.3 km	MPC · JPL
351215	2004 NQ_{3}	—	July 12, 2004	Reedy Creek	J. Broughton	·	830 m	MPC · JPL
351216	2004 NS_{22}	—	July 11, 2004	Socorro	LINEAR	·	3.3 km	MPC · JPL
351217	2004 NP_{27}	—	July 11, 2004	Socorro	LINEAR	PHO	900 m	MPC · JPL
351218	2004 OO_{7}	—	July 16, 2004	Socorro	LINEAR	·	1.4 km	MPC · JPL
351219	2004 OR_{9}	—	July 20, 2004	Reedy Creek	J. Broughton	PHO	3.0 km	MPC · JPL
351220	2004 PH_{2}	—	August 7, 2004	Reedy Creek	J. Broughton	·	1.8 km	MPC · JPL
351221	2004 PS_{6}	—	August 6, 2004	Palomar	NEAT	·	1.4 km	MPC · JPL
351222	2004 PU_{6}	—	August 6, 2004	Palomar	NEAT	·	1.3 km	MPC · JPL
351223	2004 PG_{7}	—	July 16, 2004	Socorro	LINEAR	·	970 m	MPC · JPL
351224	2004 PZ_{14}	—	August 7, 2004	Palomar	NEAT	·	5.2 km	MPC · JPL
351225	2004 PT_{27}	—	August 9, 2004	Reedy Creek	J. Broughton	·	1.4 km	MPC · JPL
351226	2004 PU_{31}	—	August 8, 2004	Socorro	LINEAR	NYS	1.4 km	MPC · JPL
351227	2004 PL_{36}	—	August 9, 2004	Socorro	LINEAR	·	1.4 km	MPC · JPL
351228	2004 PS_{40}	—	August 9, 2004	Socorro	LINEAR	·	1.4 km	MPC · JPL
351229	2004 PG_{48}	—	August 8, 2004	Socorro	LINEAR	·	1.2 km	MPC · JPL
351230	2004 PM_{49}	—	August 8, 2004	Palomar	NEAT	·	4.4 km	MPC · JPL
351231	2004 PL_{52}	—	August 8, 2004	Socorro	LINEAR	NYS	1.4 km	MPC · JPL
351232	2004 PF_{56}	—	August 9, 2004	Campo Imperatore	CINEOS	·	2.6 km	MPC · JPL
351233	2004 PJ_{57}	—	August 9, 2004	Socorro	LINEAR	·	1.2 km	MPC · JPL
351234	2004 PG_{74}	—	August 8, 2004	Socorro	LINEAR	·	1.2 km	MPC · JPL
351235	2004 PW_{92}	—	August 11, 2004	Wrightwood	J. W. Young	·	1.3 km	MPC · JPL
351236	2004 PU_{94}	—	August 10, 2004	Campo Imperatore	CINEOS	·	1.2 km	MPC · JPL
351237	2004 QL_{12}	—	August 21, 2004	Siding Spring	SSS	·	1.4 km	MPC · JPL
351238	2004 RE_{5}	—	September 4, 2004	Palomar	NEAT	·	1.5 km	MPC · JPL
351239	2004 RR_{15}	—	September 7, 2004	Socorro	LINEAR	·	1.2 km	MPC · JPL
351240	2004 RP_{17}	—	September 7, 2004	Socorro	LINEAR	·	1.1 km	MPC · JPL
351241	2004 RA_{18}	—	September 7, 2004	Kitt Peak	Spacewatch	MAS	820 m	MPC · JPL
351242	2004 RH_{26}	—	September 6, 2004	Palomar	NEAT	·	1.1 km	MPC · JPL
351243	2004 RV_{34}	—	September 7, 2004	Socorro	LINEAR	PHO	1.6 km	MPC · JPL
351244	2004 RY_{45}	—	September 8, 2004	Socorro	LINEAR	·	1.3 km	MPC · JPL
351245	2004 RT_{51}	—	September 8, 2004	Socorro	LINEAR	MAS	820 m	MPC · JPL
351246	2004 RP_{56}	—	September 8, 2004	Socorro	LINEAR	·	780 m	MPC · JPL
351247	2004 RT_{57}	—	September 8, 2004	Socorro	LINEAR	·	4.8 km	MPC · JPL
351248	2004 RH_{58}	—	September 8, 2004	Socorro	LINEAR	MAS	790 m	MPC · JPL
351249	2004 RT_{58}	—	September 8, 2004	Socorro	LINEAR	·	1.4 km	MPC · JPL
351250	2004 RK_{60}	—	September 8, 2004	Socorro	LINEAR	·	1.2 km	MPC · JPL
351251	2004 RE_{68}	—	September 8, 2004	Socorro	LINEAR	·	2.1 km	MPC · JPL
351252	2004 RO_{70}	—	September 8, 2004	Socorro	LINEAR	·	1.2 km	MPC · JPL
351253	2004 RZ_{75}	—	September 8, 2004	Socorro	LINEAR	·	1.2 km	MPC · JPL
351254	2004 RK_{76}	—	September 8, 2004	Socorro	LINEAR	TIR	4.3 km	MPC · JPL
351255	2004 RS_{89}	—	September 8, 2004	Socorro	LINEAR	·	1.0 km	MPC · JPL
351256	2004 RP_{95}	—	September 8, 2004	Socorro	LINEAR	V	760 m	MPC · JPL
351257	2004 RT_{97}	—	September 8, 2004	Socorro	LINEAR	·	1.4 km	MPC · JPL
351258	2004 RC_{102}	—	September 8, 2004	Socorro	LINEAR	·	1.3 km	MPC · JPL
351259	2004 RB_{115}	—	September 7, 2004	Socorro	LINEAR	·	1.4 km	MPC · JPL
351260	2004 RS_{137}	—	September 8, 2004	Socorro	LINEAR	·	1.8 km	MPC · JPL
351261	2004 RA_{141}	—	September 8, 2004	Socorro	LINEAR	·	1.3 km	MPC · JPL
351262	2004 RT_{176}	—	September 10, 2004	Socorro	LINEAR	·	1.2 km	MPC · JPL
351263	2004 RL_{178}	—	September 10, 2004	Socorro	LINEAR	·	1.2 km	MPC · JPL
351264	2004 RA_{181}	—	September 10, 2004	Socorro	LINEAR	·	1.4 km	MPC · JPL
351265	2004 RW_{184}	—	September 10, 2004	Socorro	LINEAR	V	710 m	MPC · JPL
351266	2004 RU_{189}	—	September 10, 2004	Socorro	LINEAR	H	650 m	MPC · JPL
351267	2004 RT_{192}	—	September 10, 2004	Socorro	LINEAR	·	1.5 km	MPC · JPL
351268	2004 RB_{196}	—	September 10, 2004	Socorro	LINEAR	·	4.5 km	MPC · JPL
351269	2004 RD_{204}	—	September 12, 2004	Socorro	LINEAR	·	1.3 km	MPC · JPL
351270	2004 RM_{204}	—	September 12, 2004	Socorro	LINEAR	·	1.5 km	MPC · JPL
351271	2004 RU_{225}	—	September 9, 2004	Socorro	LINEAR	MAS	980 m	MPC · JPL
351272	2004 RT_{231}	—	September 9, 2004	Kitt Peak	Spacewatch	MAS	720 m	MPC · JPL
351273	2004 RQ_{238}	—	August 15, 2004	Campo Imperatore	CINEOS	·	640 m	MPC · JPL
351274	2004 RH_{271}	—	September 11, 2004	Kitt Peak	Spacewatch	PHO	910 m	MPC · JPL
351275	2004 RR_{312}	—	September 15, 2004	7300	7300	·	1.3 km	MPC · JPL
351276	2004 RG_{335}	—	September 15, 2004	Kitt Peak	Spacewatch	·	1.3 km	MPC · JPL
351277	2004 RC_{346}	—	September 13, 2004	Socorro	LINEAR	·	1.4 km	MPC · JPL
351278	2004 SB_{20}	—	September 21, 2004	Socorro	LINEAR	APO	600 m	MPC · JPL
351279	2004 SJ_{20}	—	September 17, 2004	Desert Eagle	W. K. Y. Yeung	NYS	1.4 km	MPC · JPL
351280	2004 SE_{34}	—	September 17, 2004	Socorro	LINEAR	NYS	1.3 km	MPC · JPL
351281	2004 SX_{38}	—	September 17, 2004	Socorro	LINEAR	·	1.4 km	MPC · JPL
351282	2004 SH_{56}	—	September 16, 2004	Anderson Mesa	LONEOS	·	4.5 km	MPC · JPL
351283	2004 TE	—	October 2, 2004	Needville	J. Dellinger, P. G. A. Garossino	NYS · fast	1.2 km	MPC · JPL
351284	2004 TH_{4}	—	October 4, 2004	Kitt Peak	Spacewatch	MAS	770 m	MPC · JPL
351285	2004 TX_{12}	—	October 7, 2004	Goodricke-Pigott	R. A. Tucker	·	1.3 km	MPC · JPL
351286	2004 TE_{13}	—	October 7, 2004	Socorro	LINEAR	·	1.9 km	MPC · JPL
351287	2004 TW_{18}	—	October 8, 2004	Socorro	LINEAR	H	680 m	MPC · JPL
351288	2004 TU_{23}	—	October 4, 2004	Kitt Peak	Spacewatch	NYS	1.3 km	MPC · JPL
351289	2004 TN_{47}	—	October 4, 2004	Kitt Peak	Spacewatch	·	1.5 km	MPC · JPL
351290	2004 TX_{61}	—	October 5, 2004	Anderson Mesa	LONEOS	NYS	1.3 km	MPC · JPL
351291	2004 TW_{81}	—	October 5, 2004	Kitt Peak	Spacewatch	·	1.1 km	MPC · JPL
351292	2004 TG_{89}	—	October 5, 2004	Kitt Peak	Spacewatch	MAS	810 m	MPC · JPL
351293	2004 TV_{104}	—	October 7, 2004	Kitt Peak	Spacewatch	·	1.3 km	MPC · JPL
351294	2004 TX_{105}	—	September 8, 2004	Socorro	LINEAR	·	1.4 km	MPC · JPL
351295	2004 TA_{116}	—	October 3, 2004	Palomar	NEAT	·	1.2 km	MPC · JPL
351296	2004 TU_{122}	—	October 7, 2004	Socorro	LINEAR	·	1.9 km	MPC · JPL
351297	2004 TC_{123}	—	October 7, 2004	Anderson Mesa	LONEOS	·	1.2 km	MPC · JPL
351298	2004 TE_{124}	—	October 7, 2004	Socorro	LINEAR	·	1.5 km	MPC · JPL
351299	2004 TJ_{129}	—	October 7, 2004	Socorro	LINEAR	·	1.3 km	MPC · JPL
351300	2004 TE_{139}	—	October 9, 2004	Anderson Mesa	LONEOS	·	1.2 km	MPC · JPL

== 351301–351400 ==
back to top

Designation			Discovery			Properties		Ref
Permanent	Provisional	Named after	Date	Site	Discoverer(s)	Category	Diam.	Ref
351301	2004 TM_{192}	—	October 7, 2004	Kitt Peak	Spacewatch	·	1.4 km	MPC · JPL
351302	2004 TB_{193}	—	October 7, 2004	Kitt Peak	Spacewatch	·	1.2 km	MPC · JPL
351303	2004 TE_{195}	—	October 7, 2004	Kitt Peak	Spacewatch	NYS	1.2 km	MPC · JPL
351304	2004 TH_{203}	—	October 7, 2004	Kitt Peak	Spacewatch	·	2.1 km	MPC · JPL
351305	2004 TU_{213}	—	October 9, 2004	Kitt Peak	Spacewatch	·	1.4 km	MPC · JPL
351306	2004 TY_{280}	—	October 10, 2004	Kitt Peak	Spacewatch	V	850 m	MPC · JPL
351307	2004 TN_{285}	—	October 8, 2004	Kitt Peak	Spacewatch	·	1.3 km	MPC · JPL
351308	2004 TJ_{309}	—	October 10, 2004	Socorro	LINEAR	·	1.2 km	MPC · JPL
351309	2004 TA_{310}	—	October 10, 2004	Kitt Peak	Spacewatch	MAS	700 m	MPC · JPL
351310	2004 TV_{332}	—	October 9, 2004	Kitt Peak	Spacewatch	·	1.2 km	MPC · JPL
351311	2004 TQ_{342}	—	October 13, 2004	Kitt Peak	Spacewatch	PHO	860 m	MPC · JPL
351312	2004 TM_{343}	—	October 14, 2004	Socorro	LINEAR	NYS	1.5 km	MPC · JPL
351313	2004 TG_{348}	—	October 4, 2004	Kitt Peak	Spacewatch	MAS	820 m	MPC · JPL
351314	2004 TG_{367}	—	October 6, 2004	Kitt Peak	Spacewatch	·	1.2 km	MPC · JPL
351315	2004 TL_{369}	—	October 8, 2004	Kitt Peak	Spacewatch	·	1.4 km	MPC · JPL
351316	2004 UY_{2}	—	October 7, 2004	Socorro	LINEAR	·	1.4 km	MPC · JPL
351317	2004 UD_{4}	—	October 16, 2004	Socorro	LINEAR	·	2.6 km	MPC · JPL
351318	2004 UC_{8}	—	October 21, 2004	Socorro	LINEAR	·	1.4 km	MPC · JPL
351319	2004 VT_{2}	—	November 3, 2004	Kitt Peak	Spacewatch	NYS	1.4 km	MPC · JPL
351320	2004 VW_{16}	—	November 4, 2004	Catalina	CSS	·	1.3 km	MPC · JPL
351321	2004 VG_{27}	—	November 5, 2004	Kitt Peak	Spacewatch	·	1.6 km	MPC · JPL
351322	2004 VV_{29}	—	November 3, 2004	Kitt Peak	Spacewatch	·	1.1 km	MPC · JPL
351323	2004 VO_{33}	—	November 3, 2004	Kitt Peak	Spacewatch	·	1.4 km	MPC · JPL
351324	2004 VN_{46}	—	November 4, 2004	Kitt Peak	Spacewatch	·	1.2 km	MPC · JPL
351325	2004 VA_{58}	—	October 7, 2004	Kitt Peak	Spacewatch	·	1.3 km	MPC · JPL
351326	2004 VW_{72}	—	November 5, 2004	Anderson Mesa	LONEOS	·	1.8 km	MPC · JPL
351327	2004 VR_{75}	—	November 12, 2004	Catalina	CSS	H	680 m	MPC · JPL
351328	2004 WL_{10}	—	November 19, 2004	Socorro	LINEAR	·	3.8 km	MPC · JPL
351329	2004 XM_{2}	—	December 1, 2004	Palomar	NEAT	·	1.5 km	MPC · JPL
351330	2004 XH_{12}	—	December 8, 2004	Socorro	LINEAR	·	1.6 km	MPC · JPL
351331	2004 XH_{29}	—	December 10, 2004	Catalina	CSS	APO	580 m	MPC · JPL
351332	2004 XH_{41}	—	December 10, 2004	Junk Bond	Junk Bond	·	1.6 km	MPC · JPL
351333	2004 XV_{48}	—	December 10, 2004	Kitt Peak	Spacewatch	·	1.7 km	MPC · JPL
351334	2004 XZ_{88}	—	December 10, 2004	Kitt Peak	Spacewatch	(5)	1.6 km	MPC · JPL
351335	2004 XB_{102}	—	December 10, 2004	Catalina	CSS	H	690 m	MPC · JPL
351336	2004 XM_{102}	—	December 1, 2004	Catalina	CSS	·	1.8 km	MPC · JPL
351337	2004 XQ_{140}	—	December 13, 2004	Kitt Peak	Spacewatch	·	2.7 km	MPC · JPL
351338	2004 XR_{163}	—	December 15, 2004	Kitt Peak	Spacewatch	·	1.6 km	MPC · JPL
351339	2004 XF_{183}	—	December 3, 2004	Kitt Peak	Spacewatch	T_{j} (2.99) · 3:2 · SHU	4.5 km	MPC · JPL
351340	2004 YC_{5}	—	December 20, 2004	Socorro	LINEAR	APO +1km	840 m	MPC · JPL
351341	2005 AY_{5}	—	January 6, 2005	Catalina	CSS	·	1.2 km	MPC · JPL
351342	2005 AZ_{8}	—	January 7, 2005	Socorro	LINEAR	·	1.8 km	MPC · JPL
351343	2005 AS_{21}	—	January 6, 2005	Catalina	CSS	·	1.4 km	MPC · JPL
351344	2005 AD_{24}	—	January 7, 2005	Catalina	CSS	·	1.3 km	MPC · JPL
351345	2005 AO_{27}	—	January 13, 2005	Socorro	LINEAR	H	660 m	MPC · JPL
351346	2005 AX_{30}	—	January 9, 2005	Catalina	CSS	·	2.2 km	MPC · JPL
351347	2005 AO_{40}	—	January 15, 2005	Socorro	LINEAR	PHO	1.2 km	MPC · JPL
351348	2005 AC_{46}	—	January 15, 2005	Anderson Mesa	LONEOS	H	890 m	MPC · JPL
351349	2005 AT_{48}	—	January 13, 2005	Kitt Peak	Spacewatch	EUN	1.6 km	MPC · JPL
351350	2005 AV_{53}	—	January 13, 2005	Kitt Peak	Spacewatch	·	3.1 km	MPC · JPL
351351	2005 AV_{65}	—	January 13, 2005	Kitt Peak	Spacewatch	·	2.1 km	MPC · JPL
351352	2005 AP_{76}	—	January 15, 2005	Kitt Peak	Spacewatch	·	1.4 km	MPC · JPL
351353	2005 BA	—	January 16, 2005	Mayhill	Lowe, A.	·	1.3 km	MPC · JPL
351354	2005 BZ_{6}	—	January 16, 2005	Socorro	LINEAR	·	1.8 km	MPC · JPL
351355	2005 BE_{20}	—	January 16, 2005	Socorro	LINEAR	·	1.8 km	MPC · JPL
351356	2005 BJ_{23}	—	January 16, 2005	Kitt Peak	Spacewatch	·	1.3 km	MPC · JPL
351357	2005 BV_{24}	—	January 17, 2005	Socorro	LINEAR	·	1.8 km	MPC · JPL
351358	2005 BQ_{38}	—	January 16, 2005	Mauna Kea	Veillet, C.	·	1.0 km	MPC · JPL
351359	2005 BX_{48}	—	January 19, 2005	Kitt Peak	Spacewatch	·	1.3 km	MPC · JPL
351360	2005 CF_{2}	—	February 1, 2005	Catalina	CSS	EUN	1.4 km	MPC · JPL
351361	2005 CO_{3}	—	February 1, 2005	Kitt Peak	Spacewatch	·	1.2 km	MPC · JPL
351362	2005 CX_{7}	—	February 1, 2005	Catalina	CSS	H	770 m	MPC · JPL
351363	2005 CZ_{7}	—	February 1, 2005	Catalina	CSS	·	1.3 km	MPC · JPL
351364	2005 CX_{11}	—	February 1, 2005	Catalina	CSS	·	1.8 km	MPC · JPL
351365	2005 CN_{19}	—	February 2, 2005	Catalina	CSS	·	1.3 km	MPC · JPL
351366	2005 CQ_{31}	—	February 1, 2005	Kitt Peak	Spacewatch	·	1.4 km	MPC · JPL
351367	2005 CD_{40}	—	February 9, 2005	Kitt Peak	Spacewatch	·	1.6 km	MPC · JPL
351368	2005 CR_{61}	—	February 9, 2005	Kitt Peak	Spacewatch	H	700 m	MPC · JPL
351369	2005 CY_{67}	—	February 2, 2005	Socorro	LINEAR	·	1.6 km	MPC · JPL
351370	2005 EY	—	March 1, 2005	Socorro	LINEAR	T_{j} (2.67) · APO +1km	1.3 km	MPC · JPL
351371	2005 EM_{11}	—	March 2, 2005	Catalina	CSS	·	970 m	MPC · JPL
351372	2005 EU_{11}	—	March 2, 2005	Catalina	CSS	·	1.3 km	MPC · JPL
351373	2005 ER_{24}	—	March 3, 2005	Catalina	CSS	·	1.2 km	MPC · JPL
351374	2005 EM_{26}	—	March 3, 2005	Catalina	CSS	·	990 m	MPC · JPL
351375	2005 EB_{41}	—	March 1, 2005	Catalina	CSS	·	2.0 km	MPC · JPL
351376	2005 EJ_{61}	—	March 4, 2005	Catalina	CSS	·	1.7 km	MPC · JPL
351377	2005 EU_{66}	—	March 4, 2005	Mount Lemmon	Mount Lemmon Survey	EUN	1.3 km	MPC · JPL
351378	2005 EM_{67}	—	March 4, 2005	Kitt Peak	Spacewatch	BRG	1.6 km	MPC · JPL
351379	2005 EX_{67}	—	March 4, 2005	Mount Lemmon	Mount Lemmon Survey	·	2.2 km	MPC · JPL
351380	2005 ER_{68}	—	March 7, 2005	Socorro	LINEAR	RAF	1.3 km	MPC · JPL
351381	2005 EL_{84}	—	March 4, 2005	Socorro	LINEAR	·	1.4 km	MPC · JPL
351382	2005 ER_{87}	—	March 4, 2005	Mount Lemmon	Mount Lemmon Survey	·	1.1 km	MPC · JPL
351383	2005 EX_{91}	—	March 8, 2005	Anderson Mesa	LONEOS	H	830 m	MPC · JPL
351384	2005 EL_{94}	—	March 3, 2005	Catalina	CSS	·	960 m	MPC · JPL
351385	2005 EL_{129}	—	March 9, 2005	Kitt Peak	Spacewatch	·	1.9 km	MPC · JPL
351386	2005 EB_{133}	—	March 9, 2005	Catalina	CSS	(194)	1.8 km	MPC · JPL
351387	2005 EX_{136}	—	March 9, 2005	Mount Lemmon	Mount Lemmon Survey	EUN	1.6 km	MPC · JPL
351388	2005 EQ_{159}	—	March 9, 2005	Mount Lemmon	Mount Lemmon Survey	·	1.0 km	MPC · JPL
351389	2005 EO_{174}	—	March 8, 2005	Kitt Peak	Spacewatch	·	1.1 km	MPC · JPL
351390	2005 EN_{182}	—	March 9, 2005	Anderson Mesa	LONEOS	·	1.7 km	MPC · JPL
351391	2005 EO_{198}	—	March 11, 2005	Mount Lemmon	Mount Lemmon Survey	WIT	1.2 km	MPC · JPL
351392	2005 EQ_{198}	—	March 11, 2005	Mount Lemmon	Mount Lemmon Survey	·	2.1 km	MPC · JPL
351393	2005 ES_{215}	—	March 8, 2005	Socorro	LINEAR	·	1.9 km	MPC · JPL
351394	2005 EM_{222}	—	March 11, 2005	Kitt Peak	Spacewatch	·	1.4 km	MPC · JPL
351395	2005 EU_{224}	—	March 9, 2005	Catalina	CSS	HNS	1.4 km	MPC · JPL
351396	2005 ES_{230}	—	March 10, 2005	Mount Lemmon	Mount Lemmon Survey	·	1.1 km	MPC · JPL
351397	2005 ET_{234}	—	March 10, 2005	Mount Lemmon	Mount Lemmon Survey	·	1.2 km	MPC · JPL
351398	2005 EP_{240}	—	January 17, 2005	Kitt Peak	Spacewatch	3:2	7.0 km	MPC · JPL
351399	2005 ET_{240}	—	March 11, 2005	Mount Lemmon	Mount Lemmon Survey	EUN	1.2 km	MPC · JPL
351400	2005 EY_{241}	—	March 11, 2005	Catalina	CSS	·	1.8 km	MPC · JPL

== 351401–351500 ==
back to top

Designation			Discovery			Properties		Ref
Permanent	Provisional	Named after	Date	Site	Discoverer(s)	Category	Diam.	Ref
351401	2005 EA_{246}	—	March 12, 2005	Kitt Peak	Spacewatch	·	1.2 km	MPC · JPL
351402	2005 ET_{250}	—	March 9, 2005	Socorro	LINEAR	·	1.7 km	MPC · JPL
351403	2005 ES_{253}	—	March 11, 2005	Socorro	LINEAR	·	1.7 km	MPC · JPL
351404	2005 EA_{263}	—	March 13, 2005	Kitt Peak	Spacewatch	·	1.6 km	MPC · JPL
351405	2005 EB_{265}	—	March 13, 2005	Kitt Peak	Spacewatch	(5)	1.1 km	MPC · JPL
351406	2005 FS	—	March 16, 2005	Socorro	LINEAR	·	1.6 km	MPC · JPL
351407	2005 FZ_{7}	—	March 30, 2005	Catalina	CSS	·	3.4 km	MPC · JPL
351408	2005 FN_{11}	—	March 17, 2005	Catalina	CSS	·	2.3 km	MPC · JPL
351409	2005 FP_{12}	—	March 16, 2005	Catalina	CSS	·	1.7 km	MPC · JPL
351410	2005 FO_{14}	—	March 16, 2005	Anderson Mesa	LONEOS	EUN	1.6 km	MPC · JPL
351411	2005 GB_{2}	—	April 1, 2005	Catalina	CSS	EUN	1.6 km	MPC · JPL
351412	2005 GD_{7}	—	April 1, 2005	Kitt Peak	Spacewatch	·	1.6 km	MPC · JPL
351413	2005 GJ_{7}	—	April 1, 2005	Kitt Peak	Spacewatch	·	1.9 km	MPC · JPL
351414	2005 GT_{7}	—	April 1, 2005	Anderson Mesa	LONEOS	·	2.9 km	MPC · JPL
351415	2005 GR_{22}	—	April 4, 2005	Kitami	K. Endate	·	1.8 km	MPC · JPL
351416	2005 GZ_{23}	—	April 2, 2005	Mount Lemmon	Mount Lemmon Survey	·	1.4 km	MPC · JPL
351417	2005 GJ_{25}	—	April 2, 2005	Mount Lemmon	Mount Lemmon Survey	·	1.5 km	MPC · JPL
351418	2005 GE_{33}	—	April 3, 2005	Palomar	NEAT	·	1.2 km	MPC · JPL
351419	2005 GF_{37}	—	April 2, 2005	Catalina	CSS	·	2.2 km	MPC · JPL
351420	2005 GE_{38}	—	April 3, 2005	Palomar	NEAT	·	1.5 km	MPC · JPL
351421	2005 GU_{40}	—	April 4, 2005	Mount Lemmon	Mount Lemmon Survey	·	2.4 km	MPC · JPL
351422	2005 GA_{43}	—	March 18, 2005	Catalina	CSS	·	1.6 km	MPC · JPL
351423	2005 GL_{45}	—	April 5, 2005	Palomar	NEAT	·	1.6 km	MPC · JPL
351424	2005 GL_{48}	—	April 5, 2005	Mount Lemmon	Mount Lemmon Survey	·	1.5 km	MPC · JPL
351425	2005 GT_{65}	—	April 2, 2005	Catalina	CSS	·	2.6 km	MPC · JPL
351426	2005 GC_{66}	—	March 10, 2005	Mount Lemmon	Mount Lemmon Survey	·	2.1 km	MPC · JPL
351427	2005 GN_{80}	—	April 7, 2005	Kitt Peak	Spacewatch	·	2.4 km	MPC · JPL
351428	2005 GX_{104}	—	April 10, 2005	Kitt Peak	Spacewatch	·	1.3 km	MPC · JPL
351429	2005 GV_{111}	—	April 5, 2005	Catalina	CSS	·	3.7 km	MPC · JPL
351430	2005 GD_{119}	—	April 11, 2005	Anderson Mesa	LONEOS	·	2.0 km	MPC · JPL
351431	2005 GR_{122}	—	April 6, 2005	Mount Lemmon	Mount Lemmon Survey	·	1.7 km	MPC · JPL
351432	2005 GO_{150}	—	April 11, 2005	Kitt Peak	Spacewatch	·	2.1 km	MPC · JPL
351433	2005 GD_{160}	—	April 12, 2005	Kitt Peak	Spacewatch	·	2.0 km	MPC · JPL
351434	2005 GD_{163}	—	April 9, 2005	Kitt Peak	Spacewatch	·	2.0 km	MPC · JPL
351435	2005 GK_{173}	—	April 14, 2005	Kitt Peak	Spacewatch	·	1.9 km	MPC · JPL
351436	2005 GJ_{210}	—	April 9, 2005	Catalina	CSS	·	3.9 km	MPC · JPL
351437	2005 GS_{227}	—	April 6, 2005	Mount Lemmon	Mount Lemmon Survey	·	2.2 km	MPC · JPL
351438	2005 HG_{1}	—	April 16, 2005	Kitt Peak	Spacewatch	·	2.1 km	MPC · JPL
351439	2005 HD_{2}	—	April 16, 2005	Kitt Peak	Spacewatch	·	1.6 km	MPC · JPL
351440	2005 HX_{2}	—	April 17, 2005	Kitt Peak	Spacewatch	·	1.1 km	MPC · JPL
351441	2005 JY_{8}	—	May 4, 2005	Mauna Kea	Veillet, C.	·	1.9 km	MPC · JPL
351442	2005 JD_{16}	—	May 3, 2005	Socorro	LINEAR	·	2.6 km	MPC · JPL
351443	2005 JR_{35}	—	May 4, 2005	Kitt Peak	Spacewatch	·	1.9 km	MPC · JPL
351444	2005 JP_{54}	—	May 4, 2005	Kitt Peak	Spacewatch	·	2.0 km	MPC · JPL
351445	2005 JL_{78}	—	May 10, 2005	Kitt Peak	Spacewatch	·	2.6 km	MPC · JPL
351446	2005 JB_{103}	—	May 9, 2005	Catalina	CSS	·	1.6 km	MPC · JPL
351447	2005 JV_{108}	—	May 14, 2005	Catalina	CSS	BAR	2.1 km	MPC · JPL
351448	2005 JS_{118}	—	May 10, 2005	Kitt Peak	Spacewatch	·	2.0 km	MPC · JPL
351449	2005 JA_{141}	—	May 14, 2005	Kitt Peak	Spacewatch	JUN	1.3 km	MPC · JPL
351450	2005 JN_{141}	—	May 14, 2005	Mount Lemmon	Mount Lemmon Survey	·	1.9 km	MPC · JPL
351451	2005 JO_{160}	—	May 8, 2005	Kitt Peak	Spacewatch	·	1.8 km	MPC · JPL
351452	2005 JW_{160}	—	May 8, 2005	Kitt Peak	Spacewatch	·	2.6 km	MPC · JPL
351453	2005 KY_{10}	—	May 30, 2005	Siding Spring	SSS	·	2.8 km	MPC · JPL
351454	2005 KW_{13}	—	May 19, 2005	Mount Lemmon	Mount Lemmon Survey	TIR	3.8 km	MPC · JPL
351455	2005 LU_{8}	—	June 1, 2005	Kitt Peak	Spacewatch	·	2.4 km	MPC · JPL
351456	2005 LB_{28}	—	June 9, 2005	Catalina	CSS	·	2.1 km	MPC · JPL
351457	2005 MA_{22}	—	June 30, 2005	Kitt Peak	Spacewatch	·	1.8 km	MPC · JPL
351458	2005 MJ_{22}	—	June 30, 2005	Kitt Peak	Spacewatch	·	2.6 km	MPC · JPL
351459	2005 MB_{28}	—	June 29, 2005	Kitt Peak	Spacewatch	·	3.5 km	MPC · JPL
351460	2005 MF_{36}	—	June 30, 2005	Kitt Peak	Spacewatch	·	1.9 km	MPC · JPL
351461	2005 MO_{39}	—	June 29, 2005	Palomar	NEAT	·	3.6 km	MPC · JPL
351462	2005 NL_{10}	—	July 3, 2005	Mount Lemmon	Mount Lemmon Survey	AGN	1.6 km	MPC · JPL
351463	2005 NH_{30}	—	July 4, 2005	Kitt Peak	Spacewatch	·	2.8 km	MPC · JPL
351464	2005 NG_{35}	—	July 5, 2005	Kitt Peak	Spacewatch	·	2.9 km	MPC · JPL
351465	2005 NB_{40}	—	July 3, 2005	Mount Lemmon	Mount Lemmon Survey	·	2.2 km	MPC · JPL
351466	2005 NZ_{65}	—	July 1, 2005	Kitt Peak	Spacewatch	·	3.1 km	MPC · JPL
351467	2005 NX_{94}	—	July 6, 2005	Kitt Peak	Spacewatch	VER	3.6 km	MPC · JPL
351468	2005 NY_{122}	—	July 4, 2005	Palomar	NEAT	·	4.2 km	MPC · JPL
351469	2005 OG_{1}	—	July 19, 2005	Palomar	NEAT	·	3.9 km	MPC · JPL
351470	2005 OU_{8}	—	July 29, 2005	Palomar	NEAT	·	3.1 km	MPC · JPL
351471	2005 PU_{8}	—	August 4, 2005	Palomar	NEAT	·	3.2 km	MPC · JPL
351472	2005 PW_{11}	—	August 4, 2005	Palomar	NEAT	·	3.8 km	MPC · JPL
351473	2005 PW_{21}	—	August 6, 2005	Palomar	NEAT	HYG	3.2 km	MPC · JPL
351474	2005 PW_{23}	—	August 6, 2005	Palomar	NEAT	·	2.4 km	MPC · JPL
351475	2005 PH_{27}	—	August 10, 2005	Mauna Kea	P. A. Wiegert	·	3.7 km	MPC · JPL
351476	2005 QQ_{7}	—	August 24, 2005	Palomar	NEAT	·	680 m	MPC · JPL
351477	2005 QU_{13}	—	August 24, 2005	Palomar	NEAT	·	3.8 km	MPC · JPL
351478	2005 QG_{18}	—	August 25, 2005	Palomar	NEAT	·	2.7 km	MPC · JPL
351479	2005 QU_{35}	—	August 25, 2005	Palomar	NEAT	·	870 m	MPC · JPL
351480	2005 QV_{39}	—	August 26, 2005	Palomar	NEAT	TIR	3.8 km	MPC · JPL
351481	2005 QQ_{59}	—	August 25, 2005	Palomar	NEAT	·	3.2 km	MPC · JPL
351482	2005 QJ_{79}	—	August 26, 2005	Anderson Mesa	LONEOS	·	720 m	MPC · JPL
351483	2005 QY_{95}	—	August 27, 2005	Palomar	NEAT	·	3.9 km	MPC · JPL
351484	2005 QC_{97}	—	August 27, 2005	Palomar	NEAT	EOS	2.0 km	MPC · JPL
351485	2005 QO_{100}	—	August 27, 2005	Palomar	NEAT	·	2.7 km	MPC · JPL
351486	2005 QJ_{102}	—	August 27, 2005	Palomar	NEAT	·	2.2 km	MPC · JPL
351487	2005 QE_{103}	—	August 27, 2005	Palomar	NEAT	EOS	1.9 km	MPC · JPL
351488	2005 QK_{103}	—	August 27, 2005	Palomar	NEAT	·	3.1 km	MPC · JPL
351489	2005 QZ_{110}	—	August 27, 2005	Palomar	NEAT	EOS	2.3 km	MPC · JPL
351490	2005 QL_{112}	—	August 27, 2005	Palomar	NEAT	·	2.6 km	MPC · JPL
351491	2005 QO_{119}	—	August 28, 2005	Kitt Peak	Spacewatch	·	2.8 km	MPC · JPL
351492	2005 QW_{125}	—	August 28, 2005	Kitt Peak	Spacewatch	·	4.4 km	MPC · JPL
351493	2005 QH_{128}	—	August 28, 2005	Kitt Peak	Spacewatch	HYG	2.3 km	MPC · JPL
351494	2005 QT_{147}	—	August 28, 2005	Siding Spring	SSS	·	3.1 km	MPC · JPL
351495	2005 QZ_{149}	—	August 27, 2005	Kitt Peak	Spacewatch	·	3.8 km	MPC · JPL
351496	2005 QR_{153}	—	August 27, 2005	Palomar	NEAT	·	3.7 km	MPC · JPL
351497	2005 QQ_{163}	—	August 30, 2005	Kitt Peak	Spacewatch	·	890 m	MPC · JPL
351498	2005 QC_{166}	—	August 31, 2005	Palomar	NEAT	·	900 m	MPC · JPL
351499	2005 QN_{167}	—	August 27, 2005	Palomar	NEAT	·	5.1 km	MPC · JPL
351500	2005 QN_{182}	—	August 28, 2005	Kitt Peak	Spacewatch	·	870 m	MPC · JPL

== 351501–351600 ==
back to top

Designation			Discovery			Properties		Ref
Permanent	Provisional	Named after	Date	Site	Discoverer(s)	Category	Diam.	Ref
351501	2005 QQ_{188}	—	August 27, 2005	Palomar	NEAT	·	3.2 km	MPC · JPL
351502	2005 RA_{4}	—	September 3, 2005	Palomar	NEAT	·	910 m	MPC · JPL
351503	2005 RS_{7}	—	September 8, 2005	Socorro	LINEAR	·	3.2 km	MPC · JPL
351504	2005 RY_{13}	—	September 1, 2005	Kitt Peak	Spacewatch	·	670 m	MPC · JPL
351505	2005 RW_{14}	—	September 1, 2005	Kitt Peak	Spacewatch	VER	2.8 km	MPC · JPL
351506	2005 RQ_{26}	—	September 8, 2005	Socorro	LINEAR	·	770 m	MPC · JPL
351507	2005 RK_{29}	—	September 12, 2005	Junk Bond	D. Healy	·	3.4 km	MPC · JPL
351508	2005 RN_{33}	—	September 13, 2005	Catalina	CSS	AMO	390 m	MPC · JPL
351509	2005 RS_{33}	—	September 12, 2005	Junk Bond	D. Healy	·	700 m	MPC · JPL
351510	2005 RF_{41}	—	August 31, 2005	Kitt Peak	Spacewatch	·	3.4 km	MPC · JPL
351511	2005 RR_{44}	—	September 1, 2005	Palomar	NEAT	·	3.1 km	MPC · JPL
351512	2005 RH_{46}	—	September 14, 2005	Apache Point	A. C. Becker	·	3.1 km	MPC · JPL
351513	2005 SH_{43}	—	September 24, 2005	Kitt Peak	Spacewatch	·	990 m	MPC · JPL
351514	2005 SW_{47}	—	September 24, 2005	Kitt Peak	Spacewatch	·	4.6 km	MPC · JPL
351515	2005 SV_{54}	—	September 25, 2005	Kitt Peak	Spacewatch	·	3.2 km	MPC · JPL
351516	2005 SN_{67}	—	September 27, 2005	Kitt Peak	Spacewatch	·	3.1 km	MPC · JPL
351517	2005 ST_{74}	—	September 24, 2005	Kitt Peak	Spacewatch	·	3.6 km	MPC · JPL
351518	2005 SO_{84}	—	September 24, 2005	Kitt Peak	Spacewatch	·	2.8 km	MPC · JPL
351519	2005 SF_{103}	—	September 25, 2005	Palomar	NEAT	·	790 m	MPC · JPL
351520	2005 SH_{108}	—	September 26, 2005	Kitt Peak	Spacewatch	·	700 m	MPC · JPL
351521	2005 SL_{118}	—	September 28, 2005	Palomar	NEAT	·	3.6 km	MPC · JPL
351522	2005 SQ_{118}	—	September 28, 2005	Palomar	NEAT	PHO	2.6 km	MPC · JPL
351523	2005 SC_{119}	—	September 28, 2005	Palomar	NEAT	·	3.8 km	MPC · JPL
351524	2005 SO_{126}	—	September 29, 2005	Mount Lemmon	Mount Lemmon Survey	·	2.5 km	MPC · JPL
351525	2005 SY_{129}	—	September 29, 2005	Anderson Mesa	LONEOS	·	760 m	MPC · JPL
351526	2005 SY_{130}	—	September 29, 2005	Mount Lemmon	Mount Lemmon Survey	·	610 m	MPC · JPL
351527	2005 SG_{137}	—	September 24, 2005	Kitt Peak	Spacewatch	·	660 m	MPC · JPL
351528	2005 SU_{140}	—	September 25, 2005	Kitt Peak	Spacewatch	·	2.9 km	MPC · JPL
351529	2005 SJ_{141}	—	September 25, 2005	Kitt Peak	Spacewatch	·	5.4 km	MPC · JPL
351530	2005 SF_{166}	—	September 28, 2005	Palomar	NEAT	·	810 m	MPC · JPL
351531	2005 SC_{173}	—	September 29, 2005	Kitt Peak	Spacewatch	·	800 m	MPC · JPL
351532	2005 SA_{188}	—	September 29, 2005	Mount Lemmon	Mount Lemmon Survey	THM	2.3 km	MPC · JPL
351533	2005 SL_{193}	—	September 29, 2005	Kitt Peak	Spacewatch	·	870 m	MPC · JPL
351534	2005 SM_{194}	—	August 31, 2005	Kitt Peak	Spacewatch	·	3.5 km	MPC · JPL
351535	2005 SS_{194}	—	September 30, 2005	Kitt Peak	Spacewatch	·	3.8 km	MPC · JPL
351536	2005 SC_{195}	—	September 30, 2005	Palomar	NEAT	EUP	3.6 km	MPC · JPL
351537	2005 SP_{212}	—	September 30, 2005	Mount Lemmon	Mount Lemmon Survey	·	3.1 km	MPC · JPL
351538	2005 SD_{220}	—	September 29, 2005	Catalina	CSS	·	5.1 km	MPC · JPL
351539	2005 SS_{250}	—	September 23, 2005	Catalina	CSS	·	790 m	MPC · JPL
351540	2005 SD_{259}	—	September 24, 2005	Kitt Peak	Spacewatch	·	690 m	MPC · JPL
351541	2005 SC_{263}	—	September 23, 2005	Kitt Peak	Spacewatch	·	720 m	MPC · JPL
351542	2005 TY_{6}	—	October 1, 2005	Catalina	CSS	·	1.0 km	MPC · JPL
351543	2005 TP_{10}	—	October 2, 2005	Palomar	NEAT	·	1.1 km	MPC · JPL
351544	2005 TD_{13}	—	October 2, 2005	Mount Lemmon	Mount Lemmon Survey	·	2.9 km	MPC · JPL
351545	2005 TE_{15}	—	October 4, 2005	Palomar	NEAT	APO	390 m	MPC · JPL
351546	2005 TA_{29}	—	October 2, 2005	Anderson Mesa	LONEOS	·	900 m	MPC · JPL
351547	2005 TF_{36}	—	October 1, 2005	Kitt Peak	Spacewatch	·	2.5 km	MPC · JPL
351548	2005 TN_{72}	—	October 5, 2005	Catalina	CSS	·	980 m	MPC · JPL
351549	2005 TJ_{73}	—	October 6, 2005	Catalina	CSS	·	680 m	MPC · JPL
351550	2005 TX_{73}	—	October 7, 2005	Anderson Mesa	LONEOS	·	780 m	MPC · JPL
351551	2005 TY_{97}	—	October 6, 2005	Mount Lemmon	Mount Lemmon Survey	TIR	4.7 km	MPC · JPL
351552	2005 TK_{100}	—	September 26, 2005	Kitt Peak	Spacewatch	·	790 m	MPC · JPL
351553	2005 TB_{113}	—	October 7, 2005	Kitt Peak	Spacewatch	·	570 m	MPC · JPL
351554	2005 TT_{132}	—	March 7, 2003	Kitt Peak	Spacewatch	·	2.0 km	MPC · JPL
351555	2005 TK_{134}	—	October 10, 2005	Catalina	CSS	·	4.3 km	MPC · JPL
351556	2005 TW_{146}	—	October 8, 2005	Kitt Peak	Spacewatch	VER	3.1 km	MPC · JPL
351557	2005 TN_{148}	—	October 8, 2005	Kitt Peak	Spacewatch	·	4.4 km	MPC · JPL
351558	2005 TO_{177}	—	October 4, 2005	Palomar	NEAT	·	2.3 km	MPC · JPL
351559	2005 TA_{193}	—	October 11, 2005	Apache Point	A. C. Becker	·	690 m	MPC · JPL
351560	2005 TJ_{194}	—	October 1, 2005	Kitt Peak	Spacewatch	·	4.5 km	MPC · JPL
351561	2005 UR_{23}	—	October 23, 2005	Kitt Peak	Spacewatch	·	800 m	MPC · JPL
351562	2005 UY_{53}	—	October 23, 2005	Catalina	CSS	·	840 m	MPC · JPL
351563	2005 UU_{60}	—	October 25, 2005	Mount Lemmon	Mount Lemmon Survey	·	690 m	MPC · JPL
351564	2005 UJ_{143}	—	October 25, 2005	Mount Lemmon	Mount Lemmon Survey	·	1.2 km	MPC · JPL
351565	2005 UD_{157}	—	October 27, 2005	Mount Lemmon	Mount Lemmon Survey	·	800 m	MPC · JPL
351566	2005 UU_{164}	—	October 24, 2005	Kitt Peak	Spacewatch	·	710 m	MPC · JPL
351567	2005 UR_{178}	—	October 24, 2005	Kitt Peak	Spacewatch	·	840 m	MPC · JPL
351568	2005 UN_{180}	—	October 24, 2005	Kitt Peak	Spacewatch	·	790 m	MPC · JPL
351569	2005 UU_{221}	—	October 25, 2005	Kitt Peak	Spacewatch	VER	3.6 km	MPC · JPL
351570	2005 UQ_{240}	—	October 25, 2005	Kitt Peak	Spacewatch	·	730 m	MPC · JPL
351571	2005 UA_{244}	—	October 25, 2005	Kitt Peak	Spacewatch	·	790 m	MPC · JPL
351572	2005 UH_{246}	—	October 27, 2005	Kitt Peak	Spacewatch	·	670 m	MPC · JPL
351573	2005 UF_{251}	—	October 23, 2005	Catalina	CSS	·	1.0 km	MPC · JPL
351574	2005 UU_{271}	—	October 28, 2005	Kitt Peak	Spacewatch	·	560 m	MPC · JPL
351575	2005 UB_{280}	—	October 24, 2005	Kitt Peak	Spacewatch	·	3.9 km	MPC · JPL
351576	2005 UE_{283}	—	October 26, 2005	Kitt Peak	Spacewatch	·	1.5 km	MPC · JPL
351577	2005 UO_{290}	—	October 26, 2005	Kitt Peak	Spacewatch	·	3.1 km	MPC · JPL
351578	2005 UB_{317}	—	October 27, 2005	Mount Lemmon	Mount Lemmon Survey	·	3.9 km	MPC · JPL
351579	2005 UF_{326}	—	October 29, 2005	Mount Lemmon	Mount Lemmon Survey	·	790 m	MPC · JPL
351580	2005 UY_{352}	—	October 29, 2005	Catalina	CSS	·	1.0 km	MPC · JPL
351581	2005 UR_{358}	—	October 24, 2005	Kitt Peak	Spacewatch	·	650 m	MPC · JPL
351582	2005 UC_{364}	—	October 27, 2005	Kitt Peak	Spacewatch	·	780 m	MPC · JPL
351583	2005 UQ_{428}	—	October 28, 2005	Kitt Peak	Spacewatch	·	700 m	MPC · JPL
351584	2005 UQ_{438}	—	October 28, 2005	Socorro	LINEAR	·	810 m	MPC · JPL
351585	2005 UL_{455}	—	October 29, 2005	Catalina	CSS	·	4.1 km	MPC · JPL
351586	2005 UT_{456}	—	October 30, 2005	Palomar	NEAT	·	880 m	MPC · JPL
351587	2005 UJ_{457}	—	October 31, 2005	Catalina	CSS	·	790 m	MPC · JPL
351588	2005 UA_{481}	—	October 25, 2005	Socorro	LINEAR	EUP	5.9 km	MPC · JPL
351589	2005 UT_{485}	—	October 22, 2005	Palomar	NEAT	·	4.1 km	MPC · JPL
351590	2005 UF_{488}	—	October 23, 2005	Catalina	CSS	·	4.3 km	MPC · JPL
351591	2005 UH_{496}	—	October 26, 2005	Palomar	NEAT	·	780 m	MPC · JPL
351592	2005 UA_{510}	—	October 23, 2005	Catalina	CSS	·	880 m	MPC · JPL
351593	2005 UT_{511}	—	October 28, 2005	Kitt Peak	Spacewatch	·	770 m	MPC · JPL
351594	2005 UR_{513}	—	October 22, 2005	Kitt Peak	Spacewatch	·	650 m	MPC · JPL
351595	2005 UW_{514}	—	October 20, 2005	Apache Point	A. C. Becker	·	4.3 km	MPC · JPL
351596	2005 US_{524}	—	October 26, 2005	Kitt Peak	Spacewatch	CYB	2.7 km	MPC · JPL
351597	2005 UW_{524}	—	October 31, 2005	Catalina	CSS	URS	3.4 km	MPC · JPL
351598	2005 UO_{527}	—	October 25, 2005	Catalina	CSS	URS	5.4 km	MPC · JPL
351599	2005 VK_{16}	—	November 3, 2005	Socorro	LINEAR	·	730 m	MPC · JPL
351600	2005 VT_{32}	—	November 4, 2005	Kitt Peak	Spacewatch	·	930 m	MPC · JPL

== 351601–351700 ==
back to top

Designation			Discovery			Properties		Ref
Permanent	Provisional	Named after	Date	Site	Discoverer(s)	Category	Diam.	Ref
351601	2005 VX_{82}	—	November 3, 2005	Mount Lemmon	Mount Lemmon Survey	·	730 m	MPC · JPL
351602	2005 VU_{87}	—	November 6, 2005	Kitt Peak	Spacewatch	·	3.1 km	MPC · JPL
351603	2005 VH_{102}	—	November 1, 2005	Anderson Mesa	LONEOS	·	870 m	MPC · JPL
351604	2005 VL_{112}	—	November 8, 2005	Socorro	LINEAR	·	1.1 km	MPC · JPL
351605	2005 VP_{113}	—	November 10, 2005	Kitt Peak	Spacewatch	·	1.6 km	MPC · JPL
351606	2005 VG_{114}	—	November 10, 2005	Mount Lemmon	Mount Lemmon Survey	·	1 km	MPC · JPL
351607	2005 VF_{119}	—	November 4, 2005	Mount Lemmon	Mount Lemmon Survey	·	740 m	MPC · JPL
351608	2005 VZ_{124}	—	November 7, 2005	Mauna Kea	Mauna Kea	·	1.4 km	MPC · JPL
351609	2005 VO_{127}	—	September 30, 2005	Kitt Peak	Spacewatch	·	630 m	MPC · JPL
351610	2005 VS_{130}	—	November 1, 2005	Apache Point	A. C. Becker	·	760 m	MPC · JPL
351611	2005 VG_{133}	—	November 1, 2005	Apache Point	A. C. Becker	·	3.5 km	MPC · JPL
351612	2005 VS_{133}	—	November 1, 2005	Apache Point	A. C. Becker	·	5.2 km	MPC · JPL
351613	2005 WR_{11}	—	November 22, 2005	Kitt Peak	Spacewatch	·	630 m	MPC · JPL
351614	2005 WL_{51}	—	November 25, 2005	Kitt Peak	Spacewatch	·	810 m	MPC · JPL
351615	2005 WU_{55}	—	November 26, 2005	Mount Lemmon	Mount Lemmon Survey	·	1.0 km	MPC · JPL
351616	2005 WQ_{98}	—	November 28, 2005	Socorro	LINEAR	·	970 m	MPC · JPL
351617	2005 WT_{103}	—	November 28, 2005	Socorro	LINEAR	·	1.1 km	MPC · JPL
351618	2005 WQ_{104}	—	November 28, 2005	Catalina	CSS	·	1.2 km	MPC · JPL
351619	2005 WA_{139}	—	November 26, 2005	Mount Lemmon	Mount Lemmon Survey	·	790 m	MPC · JPL
351620	2005 WC_{160}	—	November 30, 2005	Mount Lemmon	Mount Lemmon Survey	·	810 m	MPC · JPL
351621	2005 WA_{174}	—	November 30, 2005	Socorro	LINEAR	·	1.1 km	MPC · JPL
351622	2005 WF_{179}	—	November 21, 2005	Anderson Mesa	LONEOS	·	900 m	MPC · JPL
351623	2005 WU_{193}	—	November 28, 2005	Catalina	CSS	·	830 m	MPC · JPL
351624	2005 WL_{195}	—	November 25, 2005	Catalina	CSS	·	1.9 km	MPC · JPL
351625	2005 WE_{204}	—	November 26, 2005	Mount Lemmon	Mount Lemmon Survey	·	1.2 km	MPC · JPL
351626	2005 WK_{204}	—	November 30, 2005	Mount Lemmon	Mount Lemmon Survey	·	1.2 km	MPC · JPL
351627	2005 XW_{7}	—	December 1, 2005	Kitt Peak	Spacewatch	·	1.0 km	MPC · JPL
351628	2005 XO_{26}	—	December 4, 2005	Mount Lemmon	Mount Lemmon Survey	·	1.3 km	MPC · JPL
351629	2005 XG_{37}	—	December 4, 2005	Kitt Peak	Spacewatch	·	1.2 km	MPC · JPL
351630	2005 XQ_{64}	—	December 7, 2005	Socorro	LINEAR	·	950 m	MPC · JPL
351631	2005 XQ_{71}	—	December 6, 2005	Kitt Peak	Spacewatch	(2076)	910 m	MPC · JPL
351632	2005 XO_{86}	—	December 8, 2005	Kitt Peak	Spacewatch	·	1.1 km	MPC · JPL
351633	2005 YT_{5}	—	December 21, 2005	Kitt Peak	Spacewatch	·	860 m	MPC · JPL
351634	2005 YH_{16}	—	December 22, 2005	Kitt Peak	Spacewatch	NYS	880 m	MPC · JPL
351635	2005 YT_{22}	—	December 24, 2005	Kitt Peak	Spacewatch	·	1.0 km	MPC · JPL
351636	2005 YQ_{23}	—	December 24, 2005	Kitt Peak	Spacewatch	V	590 m	MPC · JPL
351637	2005 YG_{34}	—	December 24, 2005	Kitt Peak	Spacewatch	·	1.0 km	MPC · JPL
351638	2005 YF_{45}	—	December 25, 2005	Kitt Peak	Spacewatch	·	750 m	MPC · JPL
351639	2005 YA_{53}	—	December 22, 2005	Kitt Peak	Spacewatch	·	720 m	MPC · JPL
351640	2005 YL_{57}	—	December 24, 2005	Kitt Peak	Spacewatch	·	670 m	MPC · JPL
351641	2005 YY_{69}	—	April 1, 2003	Apache Point	SDSS	·	1.5 km	MPC · JPL
351642	2005 YK_{70}	—	December 26, 2005	Kitt Peak	Spacewatch	·	1.2 km	MPC · JPL
351643	2005 YM_{78}	—	December 24, 2005	Kitt Peak	Spacewatch	V	770 m	MPC · JPL
351644	2005 YS_{78}	—	December 24, 2005	Kitt Peak	Spacewatch	·	920 m	MPC · JPL
351645	2005 YP_{80}	—	December 24, 2005	Kitt Peak	Spacewatch	NYS	880 m	MPC · JPL
351646	2005 YD_{91}	—	December 26, 2005	Mount Lemmon	Mount Lemmon Survey	·	720 m	MPC · JPL
351647	2005 YO_{106}	—	December 25, 2005	Kitt Peak	Spacewatch	·	660 m	MPC · JPL
351648	2005 YO_{115}	—	December 25, 2005	Kitt Peak	Spacewatch	·	1.2 km	MPC · JPL
351649	2005 YY_{123}	—	December 25, 2005	Kitt Peak	Spacewatch	·	1.1 km	MPC · JPL
351650	2005 YG_{127}	—	December 28, 2005	Kitt Peak	Spacewatch	·	740 m	MPC · JPL
351651	2005 YJ_{130}	—	December 24, 2005	Kitt Peak	Spacewatch	·	900 m	MPC · JPL
351652	2005 YA_{131}	—	December 25, 2005	Mount Lemmon	Mount Lemmon Survey	·	690 m	MPC · JPL
351653	2005 YL_{151}	—	December 25, 2005	Kitt Peak	Spacewatch	·	1.8 km	MPC · JPL
351654	2005 YT_{155}	—	December 25, 2005	Catalina	CSS	PHO	1.9 km	MPC · JPL
351655	2005 YA_{161}	—	December 27, 2005	Kitt Peak	Spacewatch	·	830 m	MPC · JPL
351656	2005 YF_{166}	—	December 26, 2005	Mount Lemmon	Mount Lemmon Survey	·	650 m	MPC · JPL
351657	2005 YZ_{168}	—	December 30, 2005	Kitt Peak	Spacewatch	·	670 m	MPC · JPL
351658	2005 YU_{192}	—	December 30, 2005	Kitt Peak	Spacewatch	·	710 m	MPC · JPL
351659	2005 YF_{193}	—	December 30, 2005	Kitt Peak	Spacewatch	V	790 m	MPC · JPL
351660	2005 YJ_{205}	—	December 26, 2005	Mount Lemmon	Mount Lemmon Survey	·	700 m	MPC · JPL
351661	2005 YW_{205}	—	December 27, 2005	Kitt Peak	Spacewatch	·	1.2 km	MPC · JPL
351662	2005 YC_{246}	—	December 30, 2005	Kitt Peak	Spacewatch	·	1.1 km	MPC · JPL
351663	2005 YH_{249}	—	December 28, 2005	Kitt Peak	Spacewatch	·	660 m	MPC · JPL
351664	2006 AP_{2}	—	January 5, 2006	Mayhill	Lowe, A.	·	1.1 km	MPC · JPL
351665	2006 AA_{12}	—	January 4, 2006	Kitt Peak	Spacewatch	·	730 m	MPC · JPL
351666	2006 AE_{23}	—	January 4, 2006	Kitt Peak	Spacewatch	·	760 m	MPC · JPL
351667	2006 AD_{32}	—	January 5, 2006	Socorro	LINEAR	·	1.0 km	MPC · JPL
351668	2006 AG_{37}	—	January 4, 2006	Kitt Peak	Spacewatch	NYS	1.6 km	MPC · JPL
351669	2006 AZ_{39}	—	January 7, 2006	Mount Lemmon	Mount Lemmon Survey	·	1.5 km	MPC · JPL
351670	2006 AZ_{42}	—	January 6, 2006	Kitt Peak	Spacewatch	·	670 m	MPC · JPL
351671	2006 AB_{49}	—	January 5, 2006	Kitt Peak	Spacewatch	·	760 m	MPC · JPL
351672	2006 AQ_{50}	—	January 5, 2006	Kitt Peak	Spacewatch	·	880 m	MPC · JPL
351673	2006 AL_{64}	—	January 7, 2006	Mount Lemmon	Mount Lemmon Survey	·	930 m	MPC · JPL
351674	2006 AY_{64}	—	January 8, 2006	Kitt Peak	Spacewatch	·	1.6 km	MPC · JPL
351675	2006 AA_{66}	—	January 8, 2006	Mount Lemmon	Mount Lemmon Survey	PHO	2.6 km	MPC · JPL
351676	2006 AX_{72}	—	January 7, 2006	Kitt Peak	Spacewatch	·	800 m	MPC · JPL
351677	2006 AM_{78}	—	January 11, 2006	Wrightwood	J. W. Young	·	1.1 km	MPC · JPL
351678	2006 AB_{89}	—	January 5, 2006	Mount Lemmon	Mount Lemmon Survey	·	700 m	MPC · JPL
351679	2006 BK_{20}	—	January 22, 2006	Mount Lemmon	Mount Lemmon Survey	·	740 m	MPC · JPL
351680	2006 BL_{21}	—	January 5, 2006	Mount Lemmon	Mount Lemmon Survey	·	1.5 km	MPC · JPL
351681	2006 BG_{27}	—	January 20, 2006	Catalina	CSS	·	1.1 km	MPC · JPL
351682	2006 BH_{30}	—	January 20, 2006	Kitt Peak	Spacewatch	V	780 m	MPC · JPL
351683	2006 BQ_{32}	—	January 21, 2006	Kitt Peak	Spacewatch	NYS	1.1 km	MPC · JPL
351684	2006 BK_{33}	—	January 21, 2006	Kitt Peak	Spacewatch	·	1.3 km	MPC · JPL
351685	2006 BL_{36}	—	January 23, 2006	Kitt Peak	Spacewatch	NYS	1.8 km	MPC · JPL
351686	2006 BJ_{38}	—	January 23, 2006	Kitt Peak	Spacewatch	·	1.1 km	MPC · JPL
351687	2006 BL_{46}	—	January 23, 2006	Mount Lemmon	Mount Lemmon Survey	MAS	830 m	MPC · JPL
351688	2006 BQ_{46}	—	January 23, 2006	Mount Lemmon	Mount Lemmon Survey	·	680 m	MPC · JPL
351689	2006 BV_{58}	—	January 23, 2006	Kitt Peak	Spacewatch	·	920 m	MPC · JPL
351690	2006 BA_{59}	—	January 23, 2006	Mount Lemmon	Mount Lemmon Survey	·	1.3 km	MPC · JPL
351691	2006 BL_{67}	—	January 23, 2006	Kitt Peak	Spacewatch	·	830 m	MPC · JPL
351692	2006 BL_{82}	—	January 23, 2006	Mount Lemmon	Mount Lemmon Survey	·	940 m	MPC · JPL
351693	2006 BC_{85}	—	January 25, 2006	Kitt Peak	Spacewatch	MAS	640 m	MPC · JPL
351694	2006 BK_{85}	—	January 25, 2006	Kitt Peak	Spacewatch	·	1.3 km	MPC · JPL
351695	2006 BE_{86}	—	January 25, 2006	Kitt Peak	Spacewatch	·	850 m	MPC · JPL
351696	2006 BM_{134}	—	January 27, 2006	Mount Lemmon	Mount Lemmon Survey	NYS	1.1 km	MPC · JPL
351697	2006 BT_{134}	—	January 27, 2006	Mount Lemmon	Mount Lemmon Survey	·	710 m	MPC · JPL
351698	2006 BG_{140}	—	January 21, 2006	Mount Lemmon	Mount Lemmon Survey	·	850 m	MPC · JPL
351699	2006 BB_{141}	—	January 23, 2006	Mount Lemmon	Mount Lemmon Survey	·	1.3 km	MPC · JPL
351700	2006 BT_{155}	—	January 25, 2006	Kitt Peak	Spacewatch	·	1.4 km	MPC · JPL

== 351701–351800 ==
back to top

Designation			Discovery			Properties		Ref
Permanent	Provisional	Named after	Date	Site	Discoverer(s)	Category	Diam.	Ref
351701	2006 BU_{156}	—	January 25, 2006	Kitt Peak	Spacewatch	NYS	1.3 km	MPC · JPL
351702	2006 BG_{160}	—	January 26, 2006	Kitt Peak	Spacewatch	·	1.3 km	MPC · JPL
351703	2006 BS_{162}	—	January 26, 2006	Mount Lemmon	Mount Lemmon Survey	3:2	4.4 km	MPC · JPL
351704	2006 BV_{164}	—	January 26, 2006	Kitt Peak	Spacewatch	MAS	620 m	MPC · JPL
351705	2006 BE_{190}	—	January 28, 2006	Kitt Peak	Spacewatch	·	1.4 km	MPC · JPL
351706	2006 BS_{193}	—	January 30, 2006	Kitt Peak	Spacewatch	·	1.1 km	MPC · JPL
351707	2006 BB_{215}	—	January 24, 2006	Anderson Mesa	LONEOS	·	1.5 km	MPC · JPL
351708	2006 BJ_{218}	—	January 27, 2006	Mount Lemmon	Mount Lemmon Survey	·	930 m	MPC · JPL
351709	2006 BM_{218}	—	January 27, 2006	Mount Lemmon	Mount Lemmon Survey	·	950 m	MPC · JPL
351710	2006 BF_{222}	—	January 30, 2006	Kitt Peak	Spacewatch	MAS	740 m	MPC · JPL
351711	2006 BY_{222}	—	January 30, 2006	Kitt Peak	Spacewatch	·	930 m	MPC · JPL
351712	2006 BE_{224}	—	January 30, 2006	Kitt Peak	Spacewatch	3:2	6.1 km	MPC · JPL
351713	2006 BC_{226}	—	January 30, 2006	Kitt Peak	Spacewatch	·	1.3 km	MPC · JPL
351714	2006 BT_{226}	—	January 30, 2006	Catalina	CSS	·	1.2 km	MPC · JPL
351715	2006 BC_{230}	—	January 31, 2006	Kitt Peak	Spacewatch	·	1.4 km	MPC · JPL
351716	2006 BM_{242}	—	January 31, 2006	Kitt Peak	Spacewatch	·	1.1 km	MPC · JPL
351717	2006 BC_{245}	—	January 31, 2006	Kitt Peak	Spacewatch	NYS	1.2 km	MPC · JPL
351718	2006 BA_{249}	—	January 31, 2006	Kitt Peak	Spacewatch	·	1.5 km	MPC · JPL
351719	2006 BG_{260}	—	January 31, 2006	Kitt Peak	Spacewatch	·	1.0 km	MPC · JPL
351720	2006 BY_{261}	—	January 31, 2006	Kitt Peak	Spacewatch	·	870 m	MPC · JPL
351721	2006 BR_{264}	—	January 31, 2006	Kitt Peak	Spacewatch	MAS	690 m	MPC · JPL
351722	2006 BV_{268}	—	August 8, 2004	Palomar	NEAT	·	1.6 km	MPC · JPL
351723	2006 BS_{274}	—	January 23, 2006	Kitt Peak	Spacewatch	·	2.4 km	MPC · JPL
351724	2006 BB_{276}	—	January 30, 2006	Kitt Peak	Spacewatch	MAS	740 m	MPC · JPL
351725	2006 BE_{281}	—	January 30, 2006	Kitt Peak	Spacewatch	·	2.3 km	MPC · JPL
351726	2006 CV_{5}	—	February 1, 2006	Mount Lemmon	Mount Lemmon Survey	NYS	850 m	MPC · JPL
351727	2006 CF_{25}	—	February 2, 2006	Kitt Peak	Spacewatch	NYS	780 m	MPC · JPL
351728	2006 CH_{37}	—	February 2, 2006	Mount Lemmon	Mount Lemmon Survey	·	860 m	MPC · JPL
351729	2006 CC_{40}	—	February 2, 2006	Mount Lemmon	Mount Lemmon Survey	NYS	1.1 km	MPC · JPL
351730	2006 CV_{45}	—	February 3, 2006	Kitt Peak	Spacewatch	·	980 m	MPC · JPL
351731	2006 CN_{49}	—	February 3, 2006	Socorro	LINEAR	ERI	1.7 km	MPC · JPL
351732	2006 CL_{61}	—	February 2, 2006	Catalina	CSS	·	1.2 km	MPC · JPL
351733	2006 CP_{67}	—	February 1, 2006	Kitt Peak	Spacewatch	3:2 · SHU	6.1 km	MPC · JPL
351734	2006 DT_{3}	—	February 20, 2006	Catalina	CSS	·	960 m	MPC · JPL
351735	2006 DW_{5}	—	February 20, 2006	Catalina	CSS	·	1.2 km	MPC · JPL
351736	2006 DC_{10}	—	February 21, 2006	Catalina	CSS	·	1.4 km	MPC · JPL
351737	2006 DL_{10}	—	February 20, 2006	Kitt Peak	Spacewatch	·	1.0 km	MPC · JPL
351738	2006 DD_{23}	—	May 5, 2003	Kitt Peak	Spacewatch	·	1.2 km	MPC · JPL
351739	2006 DY_{42}	—	February 20, 2006	Kitt Peak	Spacewatch	MAS	680 m	MPC · JPL
351740	2006 DH_{51}	—	February 24, 2006	Kitt Peak	Spacewatch	·	1.6 km	MPC · JPL
351741	2006 DO_{51}	—	February 24, 2006	Kitt Peak	Spacewatch	·	920 m	MPC · JPL
351742	2006 DD_{68}	—	February 24, 2006	Catalina	CSS	H	710 m	MPC · JPL
351743	2006 DB_{74}	—	February 23, 2006	Kitt Peak	Spacewatch	V	960 m	MPC · JPL
351744	2006 DK_{84}	—	February 24, 2006	Kitt Peak	Spacewatch	NYS	1.1 km	MPC · JPL
351745	2006 DV_{107}	—	February 25, 2006	Kitt Peak	Spacewatch	·	1.2 km	MPC · JPL
351746	2006 DV_{108}	—	February 25, 2006	Kitt Peak	Spacewatch	NYS	1.3 km	MPC · JPL
351747	2006 DH_{112}	—	February 27, 2006	Mount Lemmon	Mount Lemmon Survey	·	1.5 km	MPC · JPL
351748	2006 DL_{116}	—	February 27, 2006	Kitt Peak	Spacewatch	·	1.2 km	MPC · JPL
351749	2006 DS_{120}	—	February 22, 2006	Anderson Mesa	LONEOS	·	1.0 km	MPC · JPL
351750	2006 DH_{125}	—	February 25, 2006	Kitt Peak	Spacewatch	·	960 m	MPC · JPL
351751	2006 DU_{126}	—	February 25, 2006	Kitt Peak	Spacewatch	·	1.4 km	MPC · JPL
351752	2006 DR_{132}	—	February 25, 2006	Kitt Peak	Spacewatch	NYS	1.0 km	MPC · JPL
351753	2006 DO_{146}	—	February 25, 2006	Kitt Peak	Spacewatch	·	880 m	MPC · JPL
351754	2006 DH_{149}	—	February 25, 2006	Kitt Peak	Spacewatch	·	890 m	MPC · JPL
351755	2006 DZ_{156}	—	February 27, 2006	Kitt Peak	Spacewatch	·	1.1 km	MPC · JPL
351756	2006 DT_{159}	—	February 27, 2006	Kitt Peak	Spacewatch	MAS	640 m	MPC · JPL
351757	2006 DR_{165}	—	February 27, 2006	Kitt Peak	Spacewatch	·	1.4 km	MPC · JPL
351758	2006 DP_{178}	—	February 27, 2006	Mount Lemmon	Mount Lemmon Survey	·	1.9 km	MPC · JPL
351759	2006 DY_{187}	—	February 27, 2006	Kitt Peak	Spacewatch	·	1.3 km	MPC · JPL
351760	2006 DN_{195}	—	February 20, 2006	Kitt Peak	Spacewatch	·	880 m	MPC · JPL
351761	2006 DM_{196}	—	February 23, 2006	Anderson Mesa	LONEOS	·	1.8 km	MPC · JPL
351762	2006 DB_{202}	—	January 23, 2006	Kitt Peak	Spacewatch	·	830 m	MPC · JPL
351763	2006 DS_{208}	—	February 25, 2006	Kitt Peak	Spacewatch	·	1.1 km	MPC · JPL
351764	2006 DJ_{211}	—	February 24, 2006	Kitt Peak	Spacewatch	NYS	960 m	MPC · JPL
351765	2006 DN_{211}	—	February 24, 2006	Mount Lemmon	Mount Lemmon Survey	V	730 m	MPC · JPL
351766	2006 EM_{3}	—	March 2, 2006	Kitt Peak	Spacewatch	·	1.1 km	MPC · JPL
351767	2006 EK_{5}	—	March 2, 2006	Kitt Peak	Spacewatch	·	1.0 km	MPC · JPL
351768	2006 EA_{21}	—	March 3, 2006	Kitt Peak	Spacewatch	·	1.3 km	MPC · JPL
351769	2006 EF_{52}	—	March 4, 2006	Kitt Peak	Spacewatch	·	1.4 km	MPC · JPL
351770	2006 ER_{55}	—	March 5, 2006	Kitt Peak	Spacewatch	·	1.3 km	MPC · JPL
351771	2006 EX_{55}	—	March 5, 2006	Kitt Peak	Spacewatch	NYS	950 m	MPC · JPL
351772	2006 EC_{69}	—	March 2, 2006	Kitt Peak	M. W. Buie	MAS	750 m	MPC · JPL
351773	2006 FV_{13}	—	March 23, 2006	Kitt Peak	Spacewatch	NYS	1.2 km	MPC · JPL
351774	2006 FE_{41}	—	March 26, 2006	Mount Lemmon	Mount Lemmon Survey	MAS	790 m	MPC · JPL
351775	2006 GW_{7}	—	April 2, 2006	Kitt Peak	Spacewatch	NYS	1.2 km	MPC · JPL
351776	2006 GH_{24}	—	April 2, 2006	Kitt Peak	Spacewatch	·	1.3 km	MPC · JPL
351777	2006 GK_{29}	—	April 2, 2006	Kitt Peak	Spacewatch	V	850 m	MPC · JPL
351778	2006 GQ_{44}	—	April 2, 2006	Mount Lemmon	Mount Lemmon Survey	·	1.2 km	MPC · JPL
351779	2006 GH_{46}	—	April 8, 2006	Kitt Peak	Spacewatch	EUN	1.6 km	MPC · JPL
351780	2006 HN	—	April 18, 2006	Kitt Peak	Spacewatch	·	1.2 km	MPC · JPL
351781	2006 HW	—	April 18, 2006	Kitt Peak	Spacewatch	V	920 m	MPC · JPL
351782	2006 HX	—	April 18, 2006	Kitt Peak	Spacewatch	·	1.3 km	MPC · JPL
351783	2006 HU_{1}	—	April 18, 2006	Palomar	NEAT	·	1.5 km	MPC · JPL
351784	2006 HZ_{11}	—	April 19, 2006	Kitt Peak	Spacewatch	·	2.3 km	MPC · JPL
351785 Reguly	2006 HL_{18}	Reguly	April 21, 2006	Piszkéstető	K. Sárneczky	·	1.2 km	MPC · JPL
351786	2006 HT_{27}	—	April 20, 2006	Kitt Peak	Spacewatch	·	1.7 km	MPC · JPL
351787	2006 HP_{31}	—	April 18, 2006	Palomar	NEAT	·	1.9 km	MPC · JPL
351788	2006 HB_{34}	—	March 25, 2006	Kitt Peak	Spacewatch	·	1.1 km	MPC · JPL
351789	2006 HB_{43}	—	April 24, 2006	Mount Lemmon	Mount Lemmon Survey	·	1.4 km	MPC · JPL
351790	2006 HW_{46}	—	April 20, 2006	Kitt Peak	Spacewatch	·	1.3 km	MPC · JPL
351791 Karenkazuki	2006 HB_{52}	Karenkazuki	April 24, 2006	Nyukasa	Nakanishi, A., Futaba, F.	·	2.2 km	MPC · JPL
351792	2006 HP_{53}	—	April 19, 2006	Catalina	CSS	·	1.4 km	MPC · JPL
351793	2006 HP_{72}	—	April 25, 2006	Kitt Peak	Spacewatch	·	1.4 km	MPC · JPL
351794	2006 HH_{74}	—	April 25, 2006	Kitt Peak	Spacewatch	·	2.0 km	MPC · JPL
351795	2006 HH_{84}	—	April 26, 2006	Kitt Peak	Spacewatch	·	2.1 km	MPC · JPL
351796	2006 HT_{144}	—	April 27, 2006	Cerro Tololo	M. W. Buie	·	1.4 km	MPC · JPL
351797	2006 JV_{23}	—	May 3, 2006	Mount Lemmon	Mount Lemmon Survey	NYS	1.1 km	MPC · JPL
351798	2006 JZ_{42}	—	May 2, 2006	Mount Lemmon	Mount Lemmon Survey	·	1.5 km	MPC · JPL
351799	2006 JT_{45}	—	May 8, 2006	Mount Lemmon	Mount Lemmon Survey	·	3.1 km	MPC · JPL
351800	2006 JG_{56}	—	April 18, 2006	Catalina	CSS	MAR	1.4 km	MPC · JPL

== 351801–351900 ==
back to top

Designation			Discovery			Properties		Ref
Permanent	Provisional	Named after	Date	Site	Discoverer(s)	Category	Diam.	Ref
351801	2006 KW_{23}	—	April 6, 2006	Siding Spring	SSS	·	1.9 km	MPC · JPL
351802	2006 KG_{29}	—	May 20, 2006	Kitt Peak	Spacewatch	V	950 m	MPC · JPL
351803	2006 KG_{45}	—	May 21, 2006	Kitt Peak	Spacewatch	PHO	1.5 km	MPC · JPL
351804	2006 KD_{46}	—	May 21, 2006	Mount Lemmon	Mount Lemmon Survey	·	1.6 km	MPC · JPL
351805	2006 KF_{57}	—	May 22, 2006	Kitt Peak	Spacewatch	·	1.1 km	MPC · JPL
351806	2006 KP_{68}	—	May 20, 2006	Mount Lemmon	Mount Lemmon Survey	·	2.2 km	MPC · JPL
351807	2006 KH_{74}	—	May 23, 2006	Kitt Peak	Spacewatch	·	1.6 km	MPC · JPL
351808	2006 KU_{86}	—	May 27, 2006	Siding Spring	SSS	·	3.6 km	MPC · JPL
351809	2006 KN_{96}	—	May 25, 2006	Kitt Peak	Spacewatch	·	3.7 km	MPC · JPL
351810	2006 KD_{141}	—	May 24, 2006	Palomar	NEAT	MAS	810 m	MPC · JPL
351811	2006 LM_{4}	—	June 11, 2006	Palomar	NEAT	·	2.0 km	MPC · JPL
351812	2006 LZ_{7}	—	June 7, 2006	Siding Spring	SSS	·	2.7 km	MPC · JPL
351813	2006 MW_{12}	—	June 19, 2006	Socorro	LINEAR	·	2.5 km	MPC · JPL
351814	2006 OK_{7}	—	July 18, 2006	Mount Lemmon	Mount Lemmon Survey	ADE	3.1 km	MPC · JPL
351815	2006 OF_{15}	—	July 30, 2006	Siding Spring	SSS	AMO	760 m	MPC · JPL
351816	2006 OZ_{21}	—	July 21, 2006	Mount Lemmon	Mount Lemmon Survey	·	3.4 km	MPC · JPL
351817	2006 PC_{7}	—	August 12, 2006	Palomar	NEAT	·	2.2 km	MPC · JPL
351818	2006 PP_{7}	—	August 12, 2006	Palomar	NEAT	·	2.1 km	MPC · JPL
351819	2006 PH_{12}	—	August 13, 2006	Palomar	NEAT	·	1.7 km	MPC · JPL
351820	2006 PK_{12}	—	August 13, 2006	Palomar	NEAT	·	2.4 km	MPC · JPL
351821	2006 PR_{19}	—	August 13, 2006	Palomar	NEAT	·	2.3 km	MPC · JPL
351822	2006 PG_{25}	—	August 13, 2006	Palomar	NEAT	HNS	1.5 km	MPC · JPL
351823	2006 PB_{32}	—	August 15, 2006	Palomar	NEAT	DOR	3.0 km	MPC · JPL
351824	2006 PG_{32}	—	August 15, 2006	Palomar	NEAT	PAD	2.1 km	MPC · JPL
351825	2006 PS_{32}	—	August 15, 2006	Siding Spring	SSS	·	3.2 km	MPC · JPL
351826	2006 PF_{40}	—	August 14, 2006	Palomar	NEAT	·	1.6 km	MPC · JPL
351827	2006 QQ_{26}	—	August 19, 2006	Kitt Peak	Spacewatch	·	2.5 km	MPC · JPL
351828	2006 QX_{30}	—	August 21, 2006	Socorro	LINEAR	H	730 m	MPC · JPL
351829	2006 QY_{40}	—	August 17, 2006	Palomar	NEAT	H	700 m	MPC · JPL
351830	2006 QY_{45}	—	August 19, 2006	Palomar	NEAT	·	2.5 km	MPC · JPL
351831	2006 QN_{49}	—	August 22, 2006	Palomar	NEAT	·	2.0 km	MPC · JPL
351832	2006 QD_{51}	—	August 23, 2006	Socorro	LINEAR	·	2.6 km	MPC · JPL
351833	2006 QV_{71}	—	August 21, 2006	Kitt Peak	Spacewatch	·	2.1 km	MPC · JPL
351834	2006 QC_{95}	—	August 16, 2006	Palomar	NEAT	BRA	1.7 km	MPC · JPL
351835	2006 QS_{100}	—	August 25, 2006	Socorro	LINEAR	H	840 m	MPC · JPL
351836	2006 QK_{102}	—	August 19, 2006	Kitt Peak	Spacewatch	·	1.7 km	MPC · JPL
351837	2006 QJ_{103}	—	August 19, 2006	Kitt Peak	Spacewatch	·	2.4 km	MPC · JPL
351838	2006 QQ_{103}	—	August 27, 2006	Kitt Peak	Spacewatch	HOF	3.1 km	MPC · JPL
351839	2006 QV_{110}	—	August 30, 2006	Mayhill	Lowe, A.	·	4.1 km	MPC · JPL
351840	2006 QX_{117}	—	August 27, 2006	Anderson Mesa	LONEOS	·	2.4 km	MPC · JPL
351841	2006 QB_{120}	—	August 29, 2006	Kitt Peak	Spacewatch	·	2.9 km	MPC · JPL
351842	2006 QF_{136}	—	August 29, 2006	Anderson Mesa	LONEOS	·	2.9 km	MPC · JPL
351843	2006 QQ_{138}	—	August 16, 2006	Palomar	NEAT	·	2.3 km	MPC · JPL
351844	2006 QF_{139}	—	August 17, 2006	Palomar	NEAT	·	2.5 km	MPC · JPL
351845	2006 QX_{158}	—	August 19, 2006	Kitt Peak	Spacewatch	NEM	2.3 km	MPC · JPL
351846	2006 QN_{180}	—	August 23, 2006	Cerro Tololo	M. W. Buie	·	2.1 km	MPC · JPL
351847	2006 RZ_{2}	—	September 14, 2006	Eskridge	Farpoint	·	3.5 km	MPC · JPL
351848	2006 RZ_{10}	—	September 12, 2006	Catalina	CSS	·	2.4 km	MPC · JPL
351849	2006 RO_{21}	—	September 15, 2006	Kitt Peak	Spacewatch	·	2.5 km	MPC · JPL
351850	2006 RM_{22}	—	September 11, 2006	Catalina	CSS	·	3.0 km	MPC · JPL
351851	2006 RP_{23}	—	September 13, 2006	Palomar	NEAT	·	2.5 km	MPC · JPL
351852	2006 RC_{29}	—	September 15, 2006	Kitt Peak	Spacewatch	·	2.3 km	MPC · JPL
351853	2006 RD_{29}	—	September 15, 2006	Kitt Peak	Spacewatch	·	2.0 km	MPC · JPL
351854	2006 RR_{31}	—	September 15, 2006	Kitt Peak	Spacewatch	·	2.3 km	MPC · JPL
351855	2006 RA_{34}	—	September 12, 2006	Catalina	CSS	·	2.3 km	MPC · JPL
351856	2006 RS_{41}	—	September 14, 2006	Kitt Peak	Spacewatch	·	2.0 km	MPC · JPL
351857	2006 RP_{75}	—	September 15, 2006	Kitt Peak	Spacewatch	·	2.0 km	MPC · JPL
351858	2006 RO_{97}	—	September 15, 2006	Kitt Peak	Spacewatch	·	2.3 km	MPC · JPL
351859	2006 RT_{104}	—	September 14, 2006	Vail-Jarnac	Jarnac	·	2.7 km	MPC · JPL
351860	2006 RC_{121}	—	September 15, 2006	Kitt Peak	Spacewatch	·	2.2 km	MPC · JPL
351861	2006 SX	—	September 17, 2006	Catalina	CSS	AGN	1.4 km	MPC · JPL
351862	2006 SZ	—	July 22, 2006	Mount Lemmon	Mount Lemmon Survey	·	2.2 km	MPC · JPL
351863	2006 SZ_{1}	—	September 16, 2006	Catalina	CSS	·	2.1 km	MPC · JPL
351864	2006 SP_{2}	—	September 16, 2006	Kitt Peak	Spacewatch	·	2.3 km	MPC · JPL
351865	2006 SF_{24}	—	September 16, 2006	Catalina	CSS	LIX	3.3 km	MPC · JPL
351866	2006 SA_{26}	—	September 16, 2006	Catalina	CSS	·	2.4 km	MPC · JPL
351867	2006 SL_{32}	—	September 17, 2006	Kitt Peak	Spacewatch	·	1.8 km	MPC · JPL
351868	2006 SA_{38}	—	September 18, 2006	Kitt Peak	Spacewatch	H	720 m	MPC · JPL
351869	2006 ST_{42}	—	September 18, 2006	Catalina	CSS	·	3.2 km	MPC · JPL
351870	2006 SP_{50}	—	September 16, 2006	Palomar	NEAT	EOS	2.3 km	MPC · JPL
351871	2006 SH_{69}	—	September 19, 2006	Kitt Peak	Spacewatch	·	2.3 km	MPC · JPL
351872	2006 ST_{72}	—	September 19, 2006	Kitt Peak	Spacewatch	H	770 m	MPC · JPL
351873	2006 SS_{77}	—	September 21, 2006	Kanab	Sheridan, E.	·	1.8 km	MPC · JPL
351874	2006 SB_{80}	—	September 18, 2006	Kitt Peak	Spacewatch	AGN	1.4 km	MPC · JPL
351875	2006 SK_{81}	—	September 18, 2006	Kitt Peak	Spacewatch	·	2.0 km	MPC · JPL
351876	2006 SO_{84}	—	September 18, 2006	Kitt Peak	Spacewatch	·	3.2 km	MPC · JPL
351877	2006 SP_{84}	—	August 19, 2001	Cerro Tololo	Deep Ecliptic Survey	AST	1.6 km	MPC · JPL
351878	2006 ST_{93}	—	September 18, 2006	Kitt Peak	Spacewatch	·	2.2 km	MPC · JPL
351879	2006 ST_{111}	—	March 7, 2003	Apache Point	SDSS	·	4.1 km	MPC · JPL
351880	2006 SR_{130}	—	September 17, 2006	Catalina	CSS	·	4.3 km	MPC · JPL
351881	2006 SH_{139}	—	September 21, 2006	Anderson Mesa	LONEOS	·	2.0 km	MPC · JPL
351882	2006 SQ_{139}	—	September 21, 2006	Anderson Mesa	LONEOS	·	2.5 km	MPC · JPL
351883	2006 SJ_{147}	—	September 19, 2006	Kitt Peak	Spacewatch	KOR	1.4 km	MPC · JPL
351884	2006 ST_{151}	—	September 19, 2006	Kitt Peak	Spacewatch	·	1.7 km	MPC · JPL
351885	2006 SA_{164}	—	September 25, 2006	Kitt Peak	Spacewatch	H	640 m	MPC · JPL
351886	2006 SO_{189}	—	September 26, 2006	Kitt Peak	Spacewatch	·	2.2 km	MPC · JPL
351887	2006 SO_{194}	—	September 26, 2006	Mount Lemmon	Mount Lemmon Survey	·	1.8 km	MPC · JPL
351888	2006 SQ_{202}	—	September 25, 2006	Kitt Peak	Spacewatch	KOR	1.4 km	MPC · JPL
351889	2006 SA_{211}	—	September 26, 2006	Mount Lemmon	Mount Lemmon Survey	·	2.3 km	MPC · JPL
351890	2006 SU_{216}	—	September 27, 2006	Kitt Peak	Spacewatch	·	2.6 km	MPC · JPL
351891	2006 SZ_{216}	—	September 27, 2006	Kitt Peak	Spacewatch	·	1.6 km	MPC · JPL
351892	2006 SL_{220}	—	September 17, 2006	Kitt Peak	Spacewatch	EOS	1.9 km	MPC · JPL
351893	2006 SZ_{223}	—	September 25, 2006	Mount Lemmon	Mount Lemmon Survey	·	2.9 km	MPC · JPL
351894	2006 SU_{229}	—	July 21, 2006	Mount Lemmon	Mount Lemmon Survey	·	2.1 km	MPC · JPL
351895	2006 SU_{230}	—	September 26, 2006	Kitt Peak	Spacewatch	·	1.4 km	MPC · JPL
351896	2006 SN_{237}	—	September 26, 2006	Kitt Peak	Spacewatch	·	2.3 km	MPC · JPL
351897	2006 SF_{241}	—	September 26, 2006	Kitt Peak	Spacewatch	KOR	1.3 km	MPC · JPL
351898	2006 SE_{242}	—	September 26, 2006	Kitt Peak	Spacewatch	KOR	1.2 km	MPC · JPL
351899	2006 SZ_{249}	—	September 26, 2006	Kitt Peak	Spacewatch	·	2.0 km	MPC · JPL
351900	2006 SS_{252}	—	September 26, 2006	Kitt Peak	Spacewatch	EOS	2.2 km	MPC · JPL

== 351901–352000 ==
back to top

Designation			Discovery			Properties		Ref
Permanent	Provisional	Named after	Date	Site	Discoverer(s)	Category	Diam.	Ref
351901	2006 SO_{261}	—	September 26, 2006	Mount Lemmon	Mount Lemmon Survey	TIR	2.7 km	MPC · JPL
351902	2006 SK_{262}	—	September 26, 2006	Mount Lemmon	Mount Lemmon Survey	·	2.0 km	MPC · JPL
351903	2006 SY_{291}	—	September 24, 2006	Catalina	CSS	·	3.7 km	MPC · JPL
351904	2006 SA_{292}	—	September 25, 2006	Catalina	CSS	H	810 m	MPC · JPL
351905	2006 ST_{310}	—	September 27, 2006	Kitt Peak	Spacewatch	·	1.8 km	MPC · JPL
351906	2006 SD_{317}	—	September 27, 2006	Kitt Peak	Spacewatch	·	2.1 km	MPC · JPL
351907	2006 SR_{324}	—	September 27, 2006	Kitt Peak	Spacewatch	·	1.6 km	MPC · JPL
351908	2006 SA_{332}	—	September 28, 2006	Mount Lemmon	Mount Lemmon Survey	·	2.4 km	MPC · JPL
351909	2006 SL_{354}	—	September 30, 2006	Catalina	CSS	LIX	4.5 km	MPC · JPL
351910	2006 SP_{355}	—	September 30, 2006	Mount Lemmon	Mount Lemmon Survey	EOS	2.1 km	MPC · JPL
351911	2006 SO_{356}	—	September 30, 2006	Catalina	CSS	·	3.5 km	MPC · JPL
351912	2006 SM_{357}	—	September 30, 2006	Catalina	CSS	·	6.2 km	MPC · JPL
351913	2006 SM_{358}	—	September 30, 2006	Kitt Peak	Spacewatch	EOS	2.1 km	MPC · JPL
351914	2006 SH_{374}	—	September 16, 2006	Apache Point	A. C. Becker	·	2.1 km	MPC · JPL
351915	2006 SX_{374}	—	September 16, 2006	Apache Point	A. C. Becker	·	2.1 km	MPC · JPL
351916	2006 SB_{377}	—	September 17, 2006	Apache Point	A. C. Becker	EOS	1.9 km	MPC · JPL
351917	2006 SL_{382}	—	September 28, 2006	Apache Point	A. C. Becker	·	2.0 km	MPC · JPL
351918	2006 SB_{386}	—	September 29, 2006	Apache Point	A. C. Becker	·	2.7 km	MPC · JPL
351919	2006 SL_{386}	—	September 29, 2006	Apache Point	A. C. Becker	·	3.4 km	MPC · JPL
351920	2006 SE_{387}	—	September 30, 2006	Apache Point	A. C. Becker	·	2.1 km	MPC · JPL
351921	2006 SO_{388}	—	September 30, 2006	Apache Point	A. C. Becker	·	1.7 km	MPC · JPL
351922	2006 SC_{389}	—	September 30, 2006	Apache Point	A. C. Becker	·	2.9 km	MPC · JPL
351923	2006 SQ_{389}	—	September 30, 2006	Apache Point	A. C. Becker	·	4.2 km	MPC · JPL
351924	2006 SK_{404}	—	September 30, 2006	Mount Lemmon	Mount Lemmon Survey	·	1.5 km	MPC · JPL
351925	2006 SO_{407}	—	September 28, 2006	Mount Lemmon	Mount Lemmon Survey	·	3.4 km	MPC · JPL
351926	2006 SH_{411}	—	September 30, 2006	Mount Lemmon	Mount Lemmon Survey	THM	1.8 km	MPC · JPL
351927	2006 SO_{411}	—	September 17, 2006	Catalina	CSS	·	2.7 km	MPC · JPL
351928	2006 TN_{4}	—	September 27, 2006	Catalina	CSS	·	2.3 km	MPC · JPL
351929	2006 TH_{18}	—	October 11, 2006	Kitt Peak	Spacewatch	·	2.1 km	MPC · JPL
351930	2006 TM_{24}	—	October 12, 2006	Kitt Peak	Spacewatch	EOS	2.5 km	MPC · JPL
351931	2006 TR_{25}	—	October 12, 2006	Kitt Peak	Spacewatch	EOS	2.3 km	MPC · JPL
351932	2006 TF_{28}	—	September 30, 2006	Mount Lemmon	Mount Lemmon Survey	EOS	1.8 km	MPC · JPL
351933	2006 TV_{31}	—	October 12, 2006	Kitt Peak	Spacewatch	·	1.8 km	MPC · JPL
351934	2006 TS_{33}	—	October 12, 2006	Kitt Peak	Spacewatch	·	2.0 km	MPC · JPL
351935	2006 TD_{35}	—	April 12, 2004	Kitt Peak	Spacewatch	·	2.0 km	MPC · JPL
351936	2006 TQ_{35}	—	October 12, 2006	Kitt Peak	Spacewatch	VER	2.7 km	MPC · JPL
351937	2006 TO_{36}	—	September 27, 2006	Mount Lemmon	Mount Lemmon Survey	·	2.8 km	MPC · JPL
351938	2006 TA_{37}	—	October 12, 2006	Kitt Peak	Spacewatch	·	2.9 km	MPC · JPL
351939	2006 TW_{43}	—	October 12, 2006	Kitt Peak	Spacewatch	THM	2.3 km	MPC · JPL
351940	2006 TC_{44}	—	October 12, 2006	Kitt Peak	Spacewatch	·	3.0 km	MPC · JPL
351941	2006 TN_{51}	—	October 12, 2006	Kitt Peak	Spacewatch	·	3.2 km	MPC · JPL
351942	2006 TE_{58}	—	October 13, 2006	Kitt Peak	Spacewatch	·	4.4 km	MPC · JPL
351943	2006 TB_{61}	—	September 18, 2006	Kitt Peak	Spacewatch	·	2.7 km	MPC · JPL
351944	2006 TF_{72}	—	October 11, 2006	Palomar	NEAT	·	2.5 km	MPC · JPL
351945	2006 TQ_{74}	—	October 2, 2006	Catalina	CSS	TIR	3.6 km	MPC · JPL
351946	2006 TO_{80}	—	October 13, 2006	Kitt Peak	Spacewatch	·	2.0 km	MPC · JPL
351947	2006 TC_{81}	—	October 13, 2006	Kitt Peak	Spacewatch	·	2.3 km	MPC · JPL
351948	2006 TW_{81}	—	October 13, 2006	Kitt Peak	Spacewatch	·	4.0 km	MPC · JPL
351949	2006 TU_{84}	—	October 13, 2006	Kitt Peak	Spacewatch	EOS	2.1 km	MPC · JPL
351950	2006 TF_{85}	—	October 13, 2006	Kitt Peak	Spacewatch	·	2.9 km	MPC · JPL
351951	2006 TQ_{85}	—	October 2, 2006	Mount Lemmon	Mount Lemmon Survey	·	2.5 km	MPC · JPL
351952	2006 TU_{85}	—	October 4, 2006	Mount Lemmon	Mount Lemmon Survey	·	3.3 km	MPC · JPL
351953	2006 TA_{88}	—	October 13, 2006	Kitt Peak	Spacewatch	EOS ·	6.1 km	MPC · JPL
351954	2006 TK_{88}	—	October 13, 2006	Kitt Peak	Spacewatch	·	2.0 km	MPC · JPL
351955	2006 TC_{95}	—	October 12, 2006	Kitt Peak	Spacewatch	·	3.0 km	MPC · JPL
351956	2006 TJ_{99}	—	October 1, 2006	Kitt Peak	Spacewatch	·	3.5 km	MPC · JPL
351957	2006 TO_{102}	—	September 28, 2006	Mount Lemmon	Mount Lemmon Survey	EOS	2.4 km	MPC · JPL
351958	2006 TB_{113}	—	October 1, 2006	Apache Point	A. C. Becker	·	2.5 km	MPC · JPL
351959	2006 TH_{113}	—	October 1, 2006	Apache Point	A. C. Becker	·	1.9 km	MPC · JPL
351960	2006 TZ_{114}	—	October 1, 2006	Apache Point	A. C. Becker	·	2.2 km	MPC · JPL
351961	2006 TQ_{117}	—	October 3, 2006	Apache Point	A. C. Becker	·	4.8 km	MPC · JPL
351962	2006 TV_{122}	—	October 12, 2006	Kitt Peak	Spacewatch	·	2.4 km	MPC · JPL
351963	2006 TQ_{128}	—	October 1, 2006	Kitt Peak	Spacewatch	·	1.6 km	MPC · JPL
351964	2006 TG_{129}	—	October 12, 2006	Palomar	NEAT	·	2.2 km	MPC · JPL
351965	2006 UV_{2}	—	October 16, 2006	Kitt Peak	Spacewatch	·	2.3 km	MPC · JPL
351966	2006 UC_{7}	—	October 16, 2006	Catalina	CSS	·	2.4 km	MPC · JPL
351967	2006 UK_{7}	—	October 16, 2006	Catalina	CSS	VER	3.4 km	MPC · JPL
351968	2006 UA_{13}	—	October 17, 2006	Mount Lemmon	Mount Lemmon Survey	·	2.3 km	MPC · JPL
351969	2006 UR_{14}	—	October 17, 2006	Mount Lemmon	Mount Lemmon Survey	EOS	2.2 km	MPC · JPL
351970	2006 UT_{19}	—	October 16, 2006	Kitt Peak	Spacewatch	·	2.4 km	MPC · JPL
351971	2006 UD_{28}	—	October 16, 2006	Kitt Peak	Spacewatch	·	2.0 km	MPC · JPL
351972	2006 UG_{30}	—	October 16, 2006	Kitt Peak	Spacewatch	·	6.1 km	MPC · JPL
351973	2006 UD_{45}	—	September 25, 2006	Mount Lemmon	Mount Lemmon Survey	EOS	2.2 km	MPC · JPL
351974	2006 UH_{56}	—	September 19, 2006	Catalina	CSS	EOS	2.4 km	MPC · JPL
351975	2006 UR_{59}	—	August 29, 2006	Catalina	CSS	·	2.8 km	MPC · JPL
351976 Borromini	2006 UP_{64}	Borromini	October 23, 2006	Vallemare Borbona	V. S. Casulli	·	2.6 km	MPC · JPL
351977	2006 UB_{70}	—	October 17, 1995	Kitt Peak	Spacewatch	·	1.0 km	MPC · JPL
351978	2006 UZ_{83}	—	October 17, 2006	Kitt Peak	Spacewatch	·	2.4 km	MPC · JPL
351979	2006 UC_{85}	—	October 17, 2006	Mount Lemmon	Mount Lemmon Survey	·	1.9 km	MPC · JPL
351980	2006 UG_{98}	—	October 18, 2006	Kitt Peak	Spacewatch	·	2.1 km	MPC · JPL
351981	2006 UR_{98}	—	October 18, 2006	Kitt Peak	Spacewatch	·	2.2 km	MPC · JPL
351982	2006 UR_{100}	—	October 18, 2006	Kitt Peak	Spacewatch	EOS	1.8 km	MPC · JPL
351983	2006 US_{107}	—	October 18, 2006	Kitt Peak	Spacewatch	·	4.0 km	MPC · JPL
351984	2006 UH_{125}	—	October 19, 2006	Kitt Peak	Spacewatch	·	2.6 km	MPC · JPL
351985	2006 UF_{131}	—	October 2, 2006	Mount Lemmon	Mount Lemmon Survey	·	2.8 km	MPC · JPL
351986	2006 UV_{134}	—	October 19, 2006	Kitt Peak	Spacewatch	·	2.9 km	MPC · JPL
351987	2006 UK_{136}	—	October 4, 2006	Mount Lemmon	Mount Lemmon Survey	EOS	2.1 km	MPC · JPL
351988	2006 UD_{156}	—	October 21, 2006	Mount Lemmon	Mount Lemmon Survey	·	3.4 km	MPC · JPL
351989	2006 UF_{179}	—	October 16, 2006	Catalina	CSS	HYG	3.3 km	MPC · JPL
351990	2006 UJ_{179}	—	October 16, 2006	Catalina	CSS	·	2.4 km	MPC · JPL
351991	2006 UX_{183}	—	September 28, 2006	Catalina	CSS	·	3.9 km	MPC · JPL
351992	2006 UA_{188}	—	October 19, 2006	Catalina	CSS	·	3.0 km	MPC · JPL
351993	2006 UG_{188}	—	October 19, 2006	Catalina	CSS	·	2.2 km	MPC · JPL
351994	2006 US_{190}	—	October 19, 2006	Catalina	CSS	·	2.5 km	MPC · JPL
351995	2006 UZ_{191}	—	October 19, 2006	Catalina	CSS	·	4.5 km	MPC · JPL
351996	2006 UK_{192}	—	October 19, 2006	Catalina	CSS	·	2.7 km	MPC · JPL
351997	2006 UA_{194}	—	October 20, 2006	Kitt Peak	Spacewatch	·	2.2 km	MPC · JPL
351998	2006 UF_{203}	—	October 22, 2006	Palomar	NEAT	·	3.1 km	MPC · JPL
351999	2006 UF_{208}	—	October 23, 2006	Kitt Peak	Spacewatch	EOS	2.2 km	MPC · JPL
352000	2006 UL_{210}	—	October 23, 2006	Kitt Peak	Spacewatch	VER	3.6 km	MPC · JPL

back to top

== See also ==
- Meanings of minor-planet names: 351001–352000
