= Dittus =

Dittus is a surname. Notable people with the surname include:

- Gottliebin Dittus (1815-1872), Victim of possession, exorcised by noted German divine Johann Blumhardt
- Barbara Dittus (1939–2001), German actress
- Hansjörg Dittus, German physicist
- Uwe Dittus (born 1959), German footballer
- Wolf Dittus (born 1943), German primatologist and behavioral ecologist

== See also ==
- Dattus
