= Meanings of minor-planet names: 310001–311000 =

As minor planet discoveries are confirmed, they are given a permanent number by the IAU's Minor Planet Center (MPC), and the discoverers can then submit names for them, following the IAU's naming conventions. The list below concerns those minor planets in the specified number-range that have received names, and explains the meanings of those names.

Official naming citations of newly named small Solar System bodies are approved and published in a bulletin by IAU's Working Group for Small Bodies Nomenclature (WGSBN). Before May 2021, citations were published in MPC's Minor Planet Circulars for many decades. Recent citations can also be found on the JPL Small-Body Database (SBDB). Until his death in 2016, German astronomer Lutz D. Schmadel compiled these citations into the Dictionary of Minor Planet Names (DMP) and regularly updated the collection.

Based on Paul Herget's The Names of the Minor Planets, Schmadel also researched the unclear origin of numerous asteroids, most of which had been named prior to World War II. This article incorporates text from this source, which is in the public domain: SBDB New namings may only be added to this list below after official publication as the preannouncement of names is condemned. The WGSBN publishes a comprehensive guideline for the naming rules of non-cometary small Solar System bodies.

== 310001–310100 ==
Named minor planet	Provisional	This minor planet was named for...	Ref · Catalog
310025 Marcuscooper	2009 TO_{26}	Marcus Cooper Walz (born 1994), English-born Spanish athlete who competes in flat-water canoeing.	IAU · 310025

== 310101–310200 ==
back to top

Named minor planet	Provisional	This minor planet was named for...	Ref · Catalog
310120 Mullaney	2011 DR_{25}	James Mullaney, American astronomy.	IAU · 310120

== 310201–310300 ==
back to top

Named minor planet	Provisional	This minor planet was named for...	Ref · Catalog
310222 Vasipetropoulou	2011 SR_{214}	Vasiliki Petropoulou (born 1982), a Greek astrophysicist. Her research includes the physical characteristics of near-Earth objects and the evolution of galaxy clusters.	IAU · 310222
310273 Paulsmeyers	2011 UT_{52}	Paul Smeyers (born 1934), a Belgian astrophysicist and Professor at the Katholieke Universiteit Leuven	JPL · 310273

== 310301–310400 ==
back to top

Named minor planet	Provisional	This minor planet was named for...	Ref · Catalog
There are no named minor planets in this number range

== 310401–310500 ==
back to top

Named minor planet	Provisional	This minor planet was named for...	Ref · Catalog
There are no named minor planets in this number range

== 310501–310600 ==
back to top

Named minor planet	Provisional	This minor planet was named for...	Ref · Catalog
There are no named minor planets in this number range

== 310601–310700 ==
back to top

Named minor planet	Provisional	This minor planet was named for...	Ref · Catalog
310652 Hansjörgdittus	2002 CX_{316}	Hansjörg Dittus (born 1957), a German physicist and Executive Board Member at the German Aerospace Center for Space Research and Technology during 2011–2021, where he contributed to the development of the small Mobile Asteroid Surface Scout (MASCOT) attached to the Japanese Hayabusa2 spacecraft which successfully landed on asteroid 162173 Ryugu in 2018.	IAU · 310652

== 310701–310800 ==
back to top

Named minor planet	Provisional	This minor planet was named for...	Ref · Catalog
There are no named minor planets in this number range

== 310801–310900 ==
back to top

Named minor planet	Provisional	This minor planet was named for...	Ref · Catalog
There are no named minor planets in this number range

== 310901–311000 ==
back to top

Named minor planet	Provisional	This minor planet was named for...	Ref · Catalog
There are no named minor planets in this number range

back to top

Preceded by 309,001–310,000	Meanings of minor-planet names List of minor planets: 310,001–311,000	Succeeded by 311,001–312,000
