= List of minor planets: 310001–311000 =

The following is a partial list of minor planets, running from minor-planet number 310001 through 311000, inclusive. The primary data for this and other partial lists is based on JPL's "Small-Body Orbital Elements" and data available from the Minor Planet Center. Critical list information is also provided by the MPC, unless otherwise specified from Lowell Observatory. A detailed description of the table's columns and additional sources are given on the main page including a complete list of every page in this series, and a statistical break-up on the dynamical classification of minor planets.

Also see the summary list of all named bodies in numerical and alphabetical order, and the corresponding naming citations for the number range of this particular list. New namings may only be added to this list after official publication, as the preannouncement of names is condemned by the Working Group for Small Bodies Nomenclature of the International Astronomical Union.

Near-Earth obj.	MBA (inner)	MBA (outer)	Centaur
Mars-crosser	MBA (middle)	Jupiter trojan	Trans-Neptunian obj.
Unclassified

== 310001–310100 ==
Designation			Discovery			Properties		Ref
Permanent	Provisional	Named after	Date	Site	Discoverer(s)	Category	Diam.	Ref
310001	2009 JD_{11}	—	May 14, 2009	Siding Spring	SSS	·	2.1 km	MPC · JPL
310002	2009 JJ_{13}	—	May 1, 2009	Cerro Burek	Burek, Cerro	·	1.4 km	MPC · JPL
310003	2009 JD_{16}	—	May 1, 2009	Kitt Peak	Spacewatch	·	4.5 km	MPC · JPL
310004	2009 JP_{16}	—	May 15, 2009	Kitt Peak	Spacewatch	·	1.9 km	MPC · JPL
310005	2009 KE	—	May 16, 2009	Mount Lemmon	Mount Lemmon Survey	L4	20 km	MPC · JPL
310006	2009 KU_{1}	—	May 17, 2009	La Sagra	OAM	LUT	5.1 km	MPC · JPL
310007	2009 KK_{3}	—	May 24, 2009	La Sagra	OAM	·	2.7 km	MPC · JPL
310008	2009 KO_{3}	—	May 17, 2009	Kitt Peak	Spacewatch	·	2.6 km	MPC · JPL
310009	2009 KA_{4}	—	May 24, 2009	Catalina	CSS	·	2.3 km	MPC · JPL
310010	2009 KR_{5}	—	May 25, 2009	Kitt Peak	Spacewatch	·	3.2 km	MPC · JPL
310011	2009 KV_{8}	—	May 24, 2009	Kitt Peak	Spacewatch	·	4.0 km	MPC · JPL
310012	2009 KL_{17}	—	May 26, 2009	Kitt Peak	Spacewatch	EOS	2.0 km	MPC · JPL
310013	2009 KQ_{17}	—	May 26, 2009	Kitt Peak	Spacewatch	·	2.9 km	MPC · JPL
310014	2009 KZ_{17}	—	May 27, 2009	Kitt Peak	Spacewatch	·	3.9 km	MPC · JPL
310015	2009 KO_{23}	—	May 27, 2009	Kitt Peak	Spacewatch	EOS	2.3 km	MPC · JPL
310016	2009 KD_{26}	—	May 29, 2009	Kitt Peak	Spacewatch	L5	11 km	MPC · JPL
310017	2009 LS_{4}	—	June 13, 2009	Kitt Peak	Spacewatch	DOR	2.4 km	MPC · JPL
310018	2009 LD_{5}	—	June 14, 2009	Kitt Peak	Spacewatch	ADE	2.3 km	MPC · JPL
310019	2009 MJ_{3}	—	June 1, 2009	Catalina	CSS	·	4.5 km	MPC · JPL
310020	2009 QH_{14}	—	August 16, 2009	Kitt Peak	Spacewatch	·	1.3 km	MPC · JPL
310021	2009 RU_{3}	—	September 13, 2009	Kachina	Hobart, J.	·	1.3 km	MPC · JPL
310022	2009 RJ_{63}	—	September 14, 2009	Kitt Peak	Spacewatch	L4	8.4 km	MPC · JPL
310023	2009 ST_{177}	—	September 20, 2009	Kitt Peak	Spacewatch	(12739)	1.4 km	MPC · JPL
310024	2009 TA	—	October 2, 2009	Mount Lemmon	Mount Lemmon Survey	slow	3.3 km	MPC · JPL
310025 Marcuscooper	2009 TO_{26}	Marcuscooper	October 14, 2009	La Sagra	OAM	L4	10 km	MPC · JPL
310026	2009 UQ_{131}	—	October 16, 2009	La Sagra	OAM	·	3.8 km	MPC · JPL
310027	2010 AH_{95}	—	February 8, 2002	Palomar	NEAT	L4	11 km	MPC · JPL
310028	2010 BJ_{51}	—	July 25, 2007	Siding Spring	SSS	PHO	2.2 km	MPC · JPL
310029	2010 DQ_{36}	—	March 14, 2000	Kitt Peak	Spacewatch	·	630 m	MPC · JPL
310030	2010 ES_{37}	—	March 12, 2010	Mount Lemmon	Mount Lemmon Survey	·	860 m	MPC · JPL
310031	2010 FR_{28}	—	March 16, 2010	Kitt Peak	Spacewatch	·	760 m	MPC · JPL
310032	2010 FP_{94}	—	March 20, 2010	Kitt Peak	Spacewatch	·	900 m	MPC · JPL
310033	2010 FG_{95}	—	March 25, 2010	Kitt Peak	Spacewatch	·	3.6 km	MPC · JPL
310034	2010 GC_{7}	—	April 6, 2010	Catalina	CSS	·	1.6 km	MPC · JPL
310035	2010 GW_{87}	—	April 13, 2010	WISE	WISE	BRA	2.6 km	MPC · JPL
310036	2010 GK_{104}	—	October 11, 2007	Kitt Peak	Spacewatch	·	2.2 km	MPC · JPL
310037	2010 GF_{106}	—	April 7, 2010	Kitt Peak	Spacewatch	·	1.0 km	MPC · JPL
310038	2010 GB_{108}	—	September 12, 2007	Mount Lemmon	Mount Lemmon Survey	·	1.4 km	MPC · JPL
310039	2010 GB_{118}	—	April 10, 2010	Kitt Peak	Spacewatch	·	1.8 km	MPC · JPL
310040	2010 GN_{121}	—	July 6, 2003	Kitt Peak	Spacewatch	·	1.9 km	MPC · JPL
310041	2010 GZ_{126}	—	April 10, 2010	Kitt Peak	Spacewatch	·	1.1 km	MPC · JPL
310042	2010 GK_{127}	—	April 10, 2010	Kitt Peak	Spacewatch	·	1.9 km	MPC · JPL
310043	2010 GJ_{136}	—	December 30, 2008	Mount Lemmon	Mount Lemmon Survey	HYG	3.7 km	MPC · JPL
310044	2010 GW_{159}	—	April 10, 2010	Mount Lemmon	Mount Lemmon Survey	(2076)	880 m	MPC · JPL
310045	2010 GR_{160}	—	January 23, 2006	Kitt Peak	Spacewatch	V	800 m	MPC · JPL
310046	2010 HP_{32}	—	September 6, 1999	Kitt Peak	Spacewatch	·	3.7 km	MPC · JPL
310047	2010 HA_{43}	—	April 22, 2010	WISE	WISE	L5	15 km	MPC · JPL
310048	2010 HU_{66}	—	April 26, 2010	WISE	WISE	·	5.2 km	MPC · JPL
310049	2010 HU_{78}	—	April 20, 2010	Mount Lemmon	Mount Lemmon Survey	·	1.7 km	MPC · JPL
310050	2010 HO_{79}	—	April 20, 2010	Kitt Peak	Spacewatch	·	1.9 km	MPC · JPL
310051	2010 HN_{82}	—	April 28, 2010	WISE	WISE	TIR	2.4 km	MPC · JPL
310052	2010 JY_{1}	—	May 3, 2010	Kitt Peak	Spacewatch	NYS	1.2 km	MPC · JPL
310053	2010 JD_{30}	—	May 3, 2010	Kitt Peak	Spacewatch	·	1.3 km	MPC · JPL
310054	2010 JW_{32}	—	May 6, 2010	Mount Lemmon	Mount Lemmon Survey	·	4.5 km	MPC · JPL
310055	2010 JW_{40}	—	May 8, 2010	Mount Lemmon	Mount Lemmon Survey	·	1.3 km	MPC · JPL
310056	2010 JC_{46}	—	March 27, 1995	Kitt Peak	Spacewatch	NYS	1.1 km	MPC · JPL
310057	2010 JE_{59}	—	May 7, 2010	WISE	WISE	·	5.4 km	MPC · JPL
310058	2010 JF_{84}	—	November 24, 2008	Mount Lemmon	Mount Lemmon Survey	·	1.2 km	MPC · JPL
310059	2010 JR_{112}	—	May 13, 2010	Siding Spring	SSS	·	2.1 km	MPC · JPL
310060	2010 JP_{116}	—	January 5, 2006	Catalina	CSS	·	1.1 km	MPC · JPL
310061	2010 JW_{131}	—	September 25, 2005	Kitt Peak	Spacewatch	LIX	4.3 km	MPC · JPL
310062	2010 JD_{148}	—	October 16, 2002	Palomar	NEAT	·	2.7 km	MPC · JPL
310063	2010 JQ_{149}	—	May 6, 2010	Catalina	CSS	·	1.5 km	MPC · JPL
310064	2010 JV_{158}	—	May 4, 2010	Kitt Peak	Spacewatch	·	910 m	MPC · JPL
310065	2010 JO_{166}	—	January 26, 2006	Mount Lemmon	Mount Lemmon Survey	·	640 m	MPC · JPL
310066	2010 KG_{8}	—	February 25, 2006	Mount Lemmon	Mount Lemmon Survey	MAS	870 m	MPC · JPL
310067	2010 KB_{9}	—	September 28, 2003	Kitt Peak	Spacewatch	·	2.2 km	MPC · JPL
310068	2010 KG_{9}	—	May 16, 2010	Nogales	Tenagra II	JUN	1.3 km	MPC · JPL
310069	2010 KW_{36}	—	February 3, 2009	Mount Lemmon	Mount Lemmon Survey	(5)	2.2 km	MPC · JPL
310070	2010 KL_{55}	—	May 23, 2010	WISE	WISE	GEF	2.1 km	MPC · JPL
310071	2010 KR_{59}	—	May 18, 2010	WISE	WISE	centaur	110 km	MPC · JPL
310072	2010 KD_{62}	—	May 18, 2010	La Sagra	OAM	·	770 m	MPC · JPL
310073	2010 KX_{81}	—	February 10, 2007	Mount Lemmon	Mount Lemmon Survey	CYB	5.8 km	MPC · JPL
310074	2010 KQ_{101}	—	May 28, 2010	WISE	WISE	EOS	2.7 km	MPC · JPL
310075	2010 KY_{102}	—	May 28, 2010	WISE	WISE	·	2.8 km	MPC · JPL
310076	2010 KY_{104}	—	May 29, 2010	WISE	WISE	·	2.9 km	MPC · JPL
310077	2010 KC_{107}	—	May 29, 2010	WISE	WISE	·	4.2 km	MPC · JPL
310078	2010 KF_{116}	—	May 30, 2010	WISE	WISE	·	2.5 km	MPC · JPL
310079	2010 KS_{117}	—	May 22, 2010	Siding Spring	SSS	·	810 m	MPC · JPL
310080	2010 LC_{1}	—	June 1, 2010	Kitt Peak	Spacewatch	·	1.5 km	MPC · JPL
310081	2010 LK_{1}	—	June 2, 2010	Nogales	Tenagra II	NYS	1.1 km	MPC · JPL
310082	2010 LP_{72}	—	March 12, 2008	Catalina	CSS	·	5.5 km	MPC · JPL
310083	2010 LB_{83}	—	June 11, 2010	WISE	WISE	HNS	2.6 km	MPC · JPL
310084	2010 LB_{108}	—	November 10, 1994	Kitt Peak	Spacewatch	·	1.6 km	MPC · JPL
310085	2010 ML_{92}	—	September 24, 2005	Kitt Peak	Spacewatch	·	4.2 km	MPC · JPL
310086	2010 MY_{101}	—	February 21, 2007	Mount Lemmon	Mount Lemmon Survey	SYL · CYB	4.6 km	MPC · JPL
310087	2010 MD_{102}	—	December 13, 2006	Mount Lemmon	Mount Lemmon Survey	·	3.4 km	MPC · JPL
310088	2010 MD_{104}	—	June 29, 2010	WISE	WISE	·	4.6 km	MPC · JPL
310089	2010 NF_{4}	—	July 4, 2010	Kitt Peak	Spacewatch	·	2.8 km	MPC · JPL
310090	2010 NK_{117}	—	February 24, 2009	Catalina	CSS	·	2.0 km	MPC · JPL
310091	2010 OY_{27}	—	December 26, 2006	Catalina	CSS	·	2.3 km	MPC · JPL
310092	2010 PR_{1}	—	August 2, 2010	Socorro	LINEAR	NYS	2.0 km	MPC · JPL
310093	2010 PC_{51}	—	November 23, 1998	Kitt Peak	Spacewatch	CYB	3.0 km	MPC · JPL
310094	2010 PH_{61}	—	September 24, 2005	Kitt Peak	Spacewatch	·	2.1 km	MPC · JPL
310095	2010 PE_{63}	—	August 13, 2010	Socorro	LINEAR	H	950 m	MPC · JPL
310096	2010 PL_{64}	—	August 10, 2010	Kitt Peak	Spacewatch	EOS	2.3 km	MPC · JPL
310097	2010 PL_{72}	—	December 2, 2005	Kitt Peak	Spacewatch	LUT	5.9 km	MPC · JPL
310098	2010 PE_{76}	—	August 10, 2010	Purple Mountain	PMO NEO Survey Program	MAS	950 m	MPC · JPL
310099	2010 RF_{22}	—	September 3, 2010	Socorro	LINEAR	·	3.0 km	MPC · JPL
310100	2010 RU_{42}	—	September 3, 2010	Piszkéstető	K. Sárneczky, Kuli, Z.	HYG	3.1 km	MPC · JPL

== 310101–310200 ==
back to top

Designation			Discovery			Properties		Ref
Permanent	Provisional	Named after	Date	Site	Discoverer(s)	Category	Diam.	Ref
310101	2010 RO_{69}	—	September 6, 2010	La Sagra	OAM	·	1.9 km	MPC · JPL
310102	2010 TO_{14}	—	October 28, 2005	Mount Lemmon	Mount Lemmon Survey	·	2.8 km	MPC · JPL
310103	2010 TL_{171}	—	October 14, 1998	Kitt Peak	Spacewatch	L4	10 km	MPC · JPL
310104	2010 UX_{28}	—	November 22, 1997	Kitt Peak	Spacewatch	L4	10 km	MPC · JPL
310105	2010 UW_{35}	—	February 6, 2002	Kitt Peak	Spacewatch	L4	8.4 km	MPC · JPL
310106	2010 UV_{51}	—	January 17, 2001	Kitt Peak	Spacewatch	L4	10 km	MPC · JPL
310107	2010 UB_{96}	—	October 29, 2010	Catalina	CSS	L4	10 km	MPC · JPL
310108	2010 VJ_{21}	—	March 17, 2005	Mount Lemmon	Mount Lemmon Survey	·	850 m	MPC · JPL
310109	2010 VQ_{30}	—	January 14, 2002	Palomar	NEAT	·	2.4 km	MPC · JPL
310110	2010 VJ_{34}	—	September 21, 2008	Catalina	CSS	L4	12 km	MPC · JPL
310111	2010 VL_{72}	—	December 17, 2000	Kitt Peak	Spacewatch	EOS	3.0 km	MPC · JPL
310112	2010 VW_{176}	—	June 22, 2007	Kitt Peak	Spacewatch	L4	10 km	MPC · JPL
310113	2010 VR_{191}	—	September 20, 2001	Socorro	LINEAR	·	1.9 km	MPC · JPL
310114	2010 VH_{194}	—	March 16, 2004	Kitt Peak	Spacewatch	·	1.5 km	MPC · JPL
310115	2010 WF_{13}	—	April 7, 2003	Kitt Peak	Spacewatch	L4	10 km	MPC · JPL
310116	2011 AT_{72}	—	October 8, 2005	Catalina	CSS	·	2.2 km	MPC · JPL
310117	2011 BG_{119}	—	March 11, 2002	Palomar	NEAT	MRX	1.1 km	MPC · JPL
310118	2011 CX_{100}	—	August 22, 2003	Palomar	NEAT	TEL	1.6 km	MPC · JPL
310119	2011 DU_{19}	—	January 26, 2006	Catalina	CSS	·	3.3 km	MPC · JPL
310120 Mullaney	2011 DR_{25}	Mullaney	December 1, 2005	Kitt Peak	L. H. Wasserman, R. L. Millis	THM	2.3 km	MPC · JPL
310121	2011 EU_{4}	—	February 9, 2005	Anderson Mesa	LONEOS	T_{j} (2.94)	5.3 km	MPC · JPL
310122	2011 EN_{13}	—	February 13, 2002	Kitt Peak	Spacewatch	·	2.2 km	MPC · JPL
310123	2011 EP_{36}	—	September 25, 2005	Kitt Peak	Spacewatch	·	1.2 km	MPC · JPL
310124	2011 ED_{55}	—	April 20, 2006	Kitt Peak	Spacewatch	·	2.4 km	MPC · JPL
310125	2011 EZ_{83}	—	October 8, 1999	Kitt Peak	Spacewatch	·	2.7 km	MPC · JPL
310126	2011 FV_{71}	—	November 14, 2002	Palomar	NEAT	·	5.1 km	MPC · JPL
310127	2011 FQ_{150}	—	March 9, 2003	Anderson Mesa	LONEOS	·	2.2 km	MPC · JPL
310128	2011 GY_{27}	—	May 20, 2006	Catalina	CSS	·	3.3 km	MPC · JPL
310129	2011 GA_{57}	—	April 28, 2003	Kitt Peak	Spacewatch	·	1.5 km	MPC · JPL
310130	2011 GH_{59}	—	January 23, 2006	Kitt Peak	Spacewatch	MRX	1.1 km	MPC · JPL
310131	2011 GO_{62}	—	April 2, 2002	Palomar	NEAT	·	3.6 km	MPC · JPL
310132	2011 GH_{63}	—	January 13, 2005	Catalina	CSS	·	3.1 km	MPC · JPL
310133	2011 GF_{75}	—	February 29, 2000	Socorro	LINEAR	EOS	2.4 km	MPC · JPL
310134	2011 HD_{32}	—	October 11, 2001	Socorro	LINEAR	·	3.8 km	MPC · JPL
310135	2011 HV_{32}	—	December 14, 2004	Socorro	LINEAR	·	3.2 km	MPC · JPL
310136	2011 HO_{54}	—	September 14, 2007	Mount Lemmon	Mount Lemmon Survey	·	3.2 km	MPC · JPL
310137	2011 HH_{67}	—	February 1, 2005	Kitt Peak	Spacewatch	NAE	3.2 km	MPC · JPL
310138	2011 HT_{79}	—	October 25, 2005	Catalina	CSS	·	1.6 km	MPC · JPL
310139	2011 HP_{80}	—	October 9, 2007	Mount Lemmon	Mount Lemmon Survey	·	2.6 km	MPC · JPL
310140	2011 HG_{81}	—	April 10, 2002	Socorro	LINEAR	·	3.6 km	MPC · JPL
310141	2011 HA_{84}	—	November 19, 2003	Palomar	NEAT	·	2.6 km	MPC · JPL
310142	2011 HP_{87}	—	September 13, 2005	Catalina	CSS	·	850 m	MPC · JPL
310143	2011 KD_{10}	—	October 19, 2003	Apache Point	SDSS	·	3.0 km	MPC · JPL
310144	2011 KQ_{11}	—	April 12, 2002	Socorro	LINEAR	·	2.3 km	MPC · JPL
310145	2011 KL_{16}	—	November 19, 2001	Socorro	LINEAR	EOS	2.9 km	MPC · JPL
310146	2011 KW_{39}	—	December 21, 2003	Kitt Peak	Spacewatch	EOS	2.7 km	MPC · JPL
310147	2011 LS_{10}	—	May 11, 2003	Kitt Peak	Spacewatch	H	620 m	MPC · JPL
310148	2011 LY_{18}	—	September 3, 2000	Socorro	LINEAR	·	1.7 km	MPC · JPL
310149	2011 MW_{6}	—	February 23, 2007	Kitt Peak	Spacewatch	·	860 m	MPC · JPL
310150	2011 OV_{57}	—	October 5, 2000	Socorro	LINEAR	·	3.9 km	MPC · JPL
310151	2011 OM_{58}	—	November 20, 2007	Catalina	CSS	·	5.2 km	MPC · JPL
310152	2011 QB_{3}	—	October 31, 2002	Socorro	LINEAR	·	3.0 km	MPC · JPL
310153	2011 QV_{8}	—	October 14, 2001	Kitt Peak	Spacewatch	·	680 m	MPC · JPL
310154	2011 QN_{23}	—	July 22, 2002	Palomar	NEAT	·	1.7 km	MPC · JPL
310155	2011 QR_{32}	—	April 7, 2003	Kitt Peak	Spacewatch	·	1.4 km	MPC · JPL
310156	2011 QO_{35}	—	October 16, 2006	Catalina	CSS	·	4.0 km	MPC · JPL
310157	2011 QU_{56}	—	November 4, 2004	Needville	J. Dellinger, D. Wells	·	1.2 km	MPC · JPL
310158	2011 QF_{61}	—	October 21, 1995	Kitt Peak	Spacewatch	·	3.2 km	MPC · JPL
310159	2011 QO_{64}	—	December 5, 2008	Mount Lemmon	Mount Lemmon Survey	·	1.5 km	MPC · JPL
310160	2011 QQ_{72}	—	May 10, 2002	Palomar	NEAT	·	1.6 km	MPC · JPL
310161	2011 QW_{91}	—	April 2, 2006	Kitt Peak	Spacewatch	·	1.5 km	MPC · JPL
310162	2011 QQ_{95}	—	April 5, 1995	Kitt Peak	Spacewatch	·	2.1 km	MPC · JPL
310163	2011 RC_{1}	—	September 30, 2005	Catalina	CSS	ULA · CYB	5.3 km	MPC · JPL
310164	2011 RV_{16}	—	February 9, 2002	Kitt Peak	Spacewatch	·	1.6 km	MPC · JPL
310165	2011 RW_{16}	—	December 22, 2008	Catalina	CSS	(2076)	1.0 km	MPC · JPL
310166	2011 SB	—	November 16, 2003	Kitt Peak	Spacewatch	·	1.3 km	MPC · JPL
310167	2011 SD	—	August 24, 2000	Socorro	LINEAR	NYS	1.1 km	MPC · JPL
310168	2011 SG	—	August 19, 2006	Kitt Peak	Spacewatch	KOR	1.7 km	MPC · JPL
310169	2011 SD_{7}	—	September 21, 2003	Palomar	NEAT	·	1.8 km	MPC · JPL
310170	2011 SN_{7}	—	August 26, 2000	Cerro Tololo	Deep Ecliptic Survey	EOS	3.7 km	MPC · JPL
310171	2011 SU_{19}	—	May 8, 2006	Siding Spring	SSS	·	2.1 km	MPC · JPL
310172	2011 ST_{26}	—	October 2, 2002	Campo Imperatore	CINEOS	·	2.2 km	MPC · JPL
310173	2011 SQ_{30}	—	August 3, 2002	Campo Imperatore	CINEOS	·	2.2 km	MPC · JPL
310174	2011 SV_{32}	—	February 4, 2005	Mount Lemmon	Mount Lemmon Survey	·	1.4 km	MPC · JPL
310175	2011 SZ_{32}	—	January 15, 2005	Kitt Peak	Spacewatch	MAS	960 m	MPC · JPL
310176	2011 SZ_{35}	—	July 18, 2006	Siding Spring	SSS	·	2.5 km	MPC · JPL
310177	2011 SG_{37}	—	March 8, 2005	Kitt Peak	Spacewatch	·	1.4 km	MPC · JPL
310178	2011 SK_{38}	—	June 23, 2006	Palomar	NEAT	·	2.2 km	MPC · JPL
310179	2011 ST_{39}	—	December 14, 2004	Socorro	LINEAR	MAS	820 m	MPC · JPL
310180	2011 SB_{52}	—	October 23, 2006	Mount Lemmon	Mount Lemmon Survey	·	3.0 km	MPC · JPL
310181	2011 SM_{57}	—	September 21, 2000	Kitt Peak	Spacewatch	·	1.1 km	MPC · JPL
310182	2011 SL_{65}	—	October 2, 1997	Caussols	ODAS	NYS	800 m	MPC · JPL
310183	2011 ST_{65}	—	July 12, 2005	Vail-Jarnac	Jarnac	·	5.3 km	MPC · JPL
310184	2011 SY_{67}	—	May 14, 2010	Mount Lemmon	Mount Lemmon Survey	·	5.1 km	MPC · JPL
310185	2011 SV_{80}	—	November 20, 2004	Kitt Peak	Spacewatch	·	760 m	MPC · JPL
310186	2011 SE_{81}	—	August 4, 2005	Palomar	NEAT	·	3.7 km	MPC · JPL
310187	2011 SS_{88}	—	March 20, 1999	Apache Point	SDSS	·	1.9 km	MPC · JPL
310188	2011 SG_{92}	—	August 13, 2007	Socorro	LINEAR	·	1.3 km	MPC · JPL
310189	2011 SE_{105}	—	March 29, 2006	Lulin	LUSS	·	1.9 km	MPC · JPL
310190	2011 SV_{106}	—	November 25, 2006	Kitt Peak	Spacewatch	·	5.6 km	MPC · JPL
310191	2011 SR_{114}	—	July 29, 2005	Palomar	NEAT	·	2.9 km	MPC · JPL
310192	2011 SM_{115}	—	March 17, 2005	Kitt Peak	Spacewatch	·	2.1 km	MPC · JPL
310193	2011 SF_{116}	—	December 31, 2008	Kitt Peak	Spacewatch	MAS	930 m	MPC · JPL
310194	2011 SO_{116}	—	September 29, 2000	Kitt Peak	Spacewatch	V	710 m	MPC · JPL
310195	2011 SS_{119}	—	April 20, 1998	Kitt Peak	Spacewatch	·	3.5 km	MPC · JPL
310196	2011 SB_{120}	—	February 13, 2004	Kitt Peak	Spacewatch	KOR	1.8 km	MPC · JPL
310197	2011 SN_{120}	—	October 9, 1996	Kitt Peak	Spacewatch	·	1.4 km	MPC · JPL
310198	2011 SU_{120}	—	March 11, 2005	Kitt Peak	Spacewatch	·	1.6 km	MPC · JPL
310199	2011 SM_{121}	—	August 28, 2006	Kitt Peak	Spacewatch	KOR	1.6 km	MPC · JPL
310200	2011 SS_{125}	—	March 19, 1996	Kitt Peak	Spacewatch	·	2.5 km	MPC · JPL

== 310201–310300 ==
back to top

Designation			Discovery			Properties		Ref
Permanent	Provisional	Named after	Date	Site	Discoverer(s)	Category	Diam.	Ref
310201	2011 SR_{128}	—	July 30, 2005	Palomar	NEAT	·	2.8 km	MPC · JPL
310202	2011 SD_{130}	—	October 28, 2006	Mount Lemmon	Mount Lemmon Survey	·	2.1 km	MPC · JPL
310203	2011 SK_{130}	—	March 12, 2002	Kitt Peak	Spacewatch	·	1.5 km	MPC · JPL
310204	2011 SG_{132}	—	September 23, 2005	Catalina	CSS	THM	3.3 km	MPC · JPL
310205	2011 SK_{132}	—	April 7, 2005	Kitt Peak	Spacewatch	·	2.2 km	MPC · JPL
310206	2011 SK_{135}	—	March 10, 2005	Mount Lemmon	Mount Lemmon Survey	·	2.2 km	MPC · JPL
310207	2011 SW_{164}	—	September 21, 1998	Kitt Peak	Spacewatch	CYB	4.8 km	MPC · JPL
310208	2011 SB_{165}	—	October 15, 2004	Mount Lemmon	Mount Lemmon Survey	MAS	930 m	MPC · JPL
310209	2011 ST_{165}	—	November 12, 1999	Kitt Peak	Spacewatch	·	1.5 km	MPC · JPL
310210	2011 SJ_{172}	—	February 2, 2000	Kitt Peak	Spacewatch	·	1.7 km	MPC · JPL
310211	2011 SB_{173}	—	February 27, 2004	Kitt Peak	Deep Ecliptic Survey	AGN	1.1 km	MPC · JPL
310212	2011 SF_{176}	—	September 19, 2006	Kitt Peak	Spacewatch	KOR	1.3 km	MPC · JPL
310213	2011 SM_{176}	—	September 29, 2005	Catalina	CSS	·	4.6 km	MPC · JPL
310214	2011 SA_{180}	—	November 16, 2006	Mount Lemmon	Mount Lemmon Survey	·	2.6 km	MPC · JPL
310215	2011 ST_{180}	—	September 7, 2000	Kitt Peak	Spacewatch	EOS	2.8 km	MPC · JPL
310216	2011 SF_{184}	—	August 30, 2005	Kitt Peak	Spacewatch	THM	2.7 km	MPC · JPL
310217	2011 SW_{184}	—	November 4, 2004	Kitt Peak	Spacewatch	·	930 m	MPC · JPL
310218	2011 SV_{190}	—	November 17, 1995	Kitt Peak	Spacewatch	·	5.3 km	MPC · JPL
310219	2011 SS_{194}	—	November 21, 2000	Socorro	LINEAR	·	6.1 km	MPC · JPL
310220	2011 SS_{206}	—	September 19, 2006	Kitt Peak	Spacewatch	·	2.0 km	MPC · JPL
310221	2011 SZ_{211}	—	October 7, 2004	Kitt Peak	Spacewatch	·	750 m	MPC · JPL
310222 Vasipetropoulou	2011 SR_{214}	Vasipetropoulou	January 18, 2002	Cima Ekar	ADAS	·	3.4 km	MPC · JPL
310223	2011 SC_{217}	—	August 19, 2006	Kitt Peak	Spacewatch	·	3.2 km	MPC · JPL
310224	2011 SZ_{218}	—	October 12, 1998	Anderson Mesa	LONEOS	·	1.1 km	MPC · JPL
310225	2011 ST_{219}	—	March 23, 2003	Kitt Peak	Spacewatch	·	3.7 km	MPC · JPL
310226	2011 SU_{230}	—	January 16, 2005	Kitt Peak	Spacewatch	·	1.3 km	MPC · JPL
310227	2011 SE_{232}	—	February 19, 2001	Socorro	LINEAR	·	2.2 km	MPC · JPL
310228	2011 SF_{233}	—	April 30, 2000	Kitt Peak	Spacewatch	·	4.0 km	MPC · JPL
310229	2011 SP_{234}	—	May 9, 2005	Mount Lemmon	Mount Lemmon Survey	·	2.0 km	MPC · JPL
310230	2011 SP_{239}	—	March 2, 2006	Kitt Peak	Spacewatch	MAS	1.0 km	MPC · JPL
310231	2011 SC_{246}	—	October 27, 2006	Mount Lemmon	Mount Lemmon Survey	·	1.9 km	MPC · JPL
310232	2011 TO_{2}	—	July 1, 2002	Palomar	NEAT	·	2.2 km	MPC · JPL
310233	2011 TF_{4}	—	May 14, 2004	Kitt Peak	Spacewatch	·	3.8 km	MPC · JPL
310234	2011 TS_{5}	—	September 13, 2005	Catalina	CSS	·	4.1 km	MPC · JPL
310235	2011 TA_{9}	—	March 3, 2000	Apache Point	SDSS	·	2.2 km	MPC · JPL
310236	2011 TT_{15}	—	February 11, 2004	Kitt Peak	Spacewatch	·	2.6 km	MPC · JPL
310237	2011 UP	—	March 23, 2003	Apache Point	SDSS	·	3.0 km	MPC · JPL
310238	2011 UU_{1}	—	November 21, 2000	Socorro	LINEAR	·	5.5 km	MPC · JPL
310239	2011 UJ_{2}	—	August 21, 2006	Kitt Peak	Spacewatch	HOF	3.0 km	MPC · JPL
310240	2011 UR_{2}	—	April 11, 2002	Palomar	NEAT	H	760 m	MPC · JPL
310241	2011 UA_{3}	—	September 3, 2005	Palomar	NEAT	T_{j} (2.99)	4.9 km	MPC · JPL
310242	2011 UD_{6}	—	January 30, 2004	Kitt Peak	Spacewatch	MIS	2.9 km	MPC · JPL
310243	2011 UE_{6}	—	October 16, 1977	Palomar	C. J. van Houten, I. van Houten-Groeneveld, T. Gehrels	·	1.5 km	MPC · JPL
310244	2011 UN_{7}	—	September 11, 2007	Kitt Peak	Spacewatch	·	1.7 km	MPC · JPL
310245	2011 UY_{7}	—	September 12, 2001	Socorro	LINEAR	·	800 m	MPC · JPL
310246	2011 UV_{8}	—	October 17, 1995	Kitt Peak	Spacewatch	·	750 m	MPC · JPL
310247	2011 UW_{12}	—	September 28, 2000	Kitt Peak	Spacewatch	·	3.0 km	MPC · JPL
310248	2011 UY_{12}	—	May 4, 2005	Mount Lemmon	Mount Lemmon Survey	·	1.8 km	MPC · JPL
310249	2011 UN_{17}	—	November 7, 2007	Kitt Peak	Spacewatch	·	1.5 km	MPC · JPL
310250	2011 UB_{18}	—	March 27, 2000	Kitt Peak	Spacewatch	AGN	1.6 km	MPC · JPL
310251	2011 UQ_{18}	—	August 20, 2002	Palomar	NEAT	·	2.6 km	MPC · JPL
310252	2011 UV_{20}	—	March 8, 2005	Kitt Peak	Spacewatch	·	2.5 km	MPC · JPL
310253	2011 US_{25}	—	September 13, 1998	Kitt Peak	Spacewatch	·	1.5 km	MPC · JPL
310254	2011 UH_{26}	—	September 13, 2005	Catalina	CSS	·	3.7 km	MPC · JPL
310255	2011 UL_{26}	—	January 19, 2004	Kitt Peak	Spacewatch	·	1.5 km	MPC · JPL
310256	2011 UF_{29}	—	July 30, 2005	Palomar	NEAT	·	3.9 km	MPC · JPL
310257	2011 UM_{30}	—	October 15, 2004	Mount Lemmon	Mount Lemmon Survey	·	1.1 km	MPC · JPL
310258	2011 UZ_{30}	—	September 10, 2002	Palomar	NEAT	EUN	1.8 km	MPC · JPL
310259	2011 UF_{31}	—	November 16, 2006	Mount Lemmon	Mount Lemmon Survey	EOS	2.3 km	MPC · JPL
310260	2011 UV_{31}	—	August 30, 2005	Palomar	NEAT	·	5.3 km	MPC · JPL
310261	2011 UP_{32}	—	November 25, 2006	Kitt Peak	Spacewatch	(21885)	4.3 km	MPC · JPL
310262	2011 UA_{33}	—	November 4, 2007	Kitt Peak	Spacewatch	·	2.2 km	MPC · JPL
310263	2011 UQ_{35}	—	August 31, 2000	Socorro	LINEAR	·	2.1 km	MPC · JPL
310264	2011 UU_{36}	—	September 26, 2002	Palomar	NEAT	·	1.9 km	MPC · JPL
310265	2011 UA_{38}	—	September 18, 2006	Kitt Peak	Spacewatch	·	2.0 km	MPC · JPL
310266	2011 UV_{41}	—	September 26, 2006	Kitt Peak	Spacewatch	·	2.3 km	MPC · JPL
310267	2011 UX_{41}	—	November 19, 2006	Kitt Peak	Spacewatch	·	3.1 km	MPC · JPL
310268	2011 UV_{47}	—	September 24, 2000	Socorro	LINEAR	·	1.2 km	MPC · JPL
310269	2011 UV_{48}	—	May 20, 2006	Kitt Peak	Spacewatch	·	1.2 km	MPC · JPL
310270	2011 UM_{49}	—	September 28, 2006	Kitt Peak	Spacewatch	HOF	3.0 km	MPC · JPL
310271	2011 UA_{50}	—	September 7, 2000	Kitt Peak	Spacewatch	MAS	850 m	MPC · JPL
310272	2011 UJ_{52}	—	December 13, 2006	Kitt Peak	Spacewatch	·	3.7 km	MPC · JPL
310273 Paulsmeyers	2011 UT_{52}	Paulsmeyers	September 8, 2004	Uccle	T. Pauwels, P. De Cat	NYS	2.1 km	MPC · JPL
310274	2011 UW_{54}	—	October 21, 2006	Palomar	NEAT	·	2.2 km	MPC · JPL
310275	2011 UF_{55}	—	November 20, 2004	Kitt Peak	Spacewatch	·	1.0 km	MPC · JPL
310276	2011 US_{56}	—	February 7, 2002	Palomar	NEAT	·	4.7 km	MPC · JPL
310277	2011 UY_{57}	—	October 21, 2006	Mount Lemmon	Mount Lemmon Survey	KOR	1.4 km	MPC · JPL
310278	2011 UQ_{59}	—	February 17, 2004	Kitt Peak	Spacewatch	·	1.6 km	MPC · JPL
310279	2011 UT_{61}	—	February 18, 2004	Kitt Peak	Spacewatch	(12739)	2.4 km	MPC · JPL
310280	2011 UN_{62}	—	April 25, 2007	Mount Lemmon	Mount Lemmon Survey	·	660 m	MPC · JPL
310281	2011 UL_{64}	—	October 1, 2000	Socorro	LINEAR	·	4.0 km	MPC · JPL
310282	2011 UV_{64}	—	October 29, 2003	Kitt Peak	Spacewatch	·	1.1 km	MPC · JPL
310283	2011 UV_{66}	—	March 27, 2003	Palomar	NEAT	(2076)	1.3 km	MPC · JPL
310284	2011 UJ_{72}	—	September 21, 2000	Kitt Peak	Spacewatch	·	2.7 km	MPC · JPL
310285	2011 UZ_{72}	—	October 4, 2004	Kitt Peak	Spacewatch	·	760 m	MPC · JPL
310286	2011 UF_{76}	—	November 17, 2006	Kitt Peak	Spacewatch	·	2.1 km	MPC · JPL
310287	2011 UZ_{77}	—	October 24, 2007	Mount Lemmon	Mount Lemmon Survey	(5)	1.4 km	MPC · JPL
310288	2011 UB_{78}	—	December 3, 2002	Palomar	NEAT	AGN	1.3 km	MPC · JPL
310289	2011 US_{78}	—	October 2, 2006	Kitt Peak	Spacewatch	·	1.9 km	MPC · JPL
310290	2011 UG_{80}	—	March 24, 2003	Kitt Peak	Spacewatch	NYS	870 m	MPC · JPL
310291	2011 UJ_{80}	—	November 1, 2000	Socorro	LINEAR	·	6.2 km	MPC · JPL
310292	2011 UM_{81}	—	April 11, 2005	Mount Lemmon	Mount Lemmon Survey	·	1.4 km	MPC · JPL
310293	2011 UR_{82}	—	February 7, 2002	Palomar	NEAT	HYG	2.9 km	MPC · JPL
310294	2011 UV_{82}	—	January 13, 2002	Kitt Peak	Spacewatch	HYG	3.2 km	MPC · JPL
310295	2011 UF_{83}	—	March 26, 2003	Kitt Peak	Spacewatch	·	800 m	MPC · JPL
310296	2011 UJ_{83}	—	October 13, 1998	Kitt Peak	Spacewatch	·	2.3 km	MPC · JPL
310297	2011 UC_{84}	—	September 26, 2002	Palomar	NEAT	·	1.2 km	MPC · JPL
310298	2011 UA_{86}	—	April 5, 2003	Kitt Peak	Spacewatch	CYB	4.5 km	MPC · JPL
310299	2011 UU_{90}	—	October 10, 2004	Kitt Peak	Spacewatch	·	1.5 km	MPC · JPL
310300	2011 UL_{94}	—	November 10, 2004	Kitt Peak	Spacewatch	·	1.0 km	MPC · JPL

== 310301–310400 ==
back to top

Designation			Discovery			Properties		Ref
Permanent	Provisional	Named after	Date	Site	Discoverer(s)	Category	Diam.	Ref
310301	2011 UK_{95}	—	September 13, 1996	Kitt Peak	Spacewatch	·	980 m	MPC · JPL
310302	2011 UX_{95}	—	April 25, 2000	Kitt Peak	Spacewatch	AST	2.1 km	MPC · JPL
310303	2011 UN_{103}	—	September 29, 1973	Palomar	C. J. van Houten, I. van Houten-Groeneveld, T. Gehrels	(5)	1.8 km	MPC · JPL
310304	2011 UM_{105}	—	March 4, 2005	Mount Lemmon	Mount Lemmon Survey	·	2.3 km	MPC · JPL
310305	2011 UY_{105}	—	September 27, 1995	Kitt Peak	Spacewatch	·	4.2 km	MPC · JPL
310306	2011 UE_{107}	—	November 1, 2000	Socorro	LINEAR	·	3.5 km	MPC · JPL
310307	2011 UD_{108}	—	October 3, 2002	Socorro	LINEAR	·	2.1 km	MPC · JPL
310308	2011 UH_{112}	—	December 2, 2008	Kitt Peak	Spacewatch	·	780 m	MPC · JPL
310309	2011 UT_{112}	—	October 2, 2005	Palomar	NEAT	·	4.5 km	MPC · JPL
310310	2011 UO_{113}	—	October 19, 2007	Catalina	CSS	·	1.6 km	MPC · JPL
310311	2011 UD_{114}	—	September 13, 2007	Mount Lemmon	Mount Lemmon Survey	MAS	700 m	MPC · JPL
310312	2011 UZ_{121}	—	February 9, 2008	Mount Lemmon	Mount Lemmon Survey	HYG	3.1 km	MPC · JPL
310313	2011 UD_{125}	—	September 8, 2004	Socorro	LINEAR	·	640 m	MPC · JPL
310314	2011 UG_{127}	—	March 10, 2003	Anderson Mesa	LONEOS	·	3.7 km	MPC · JPL
310315	2011 UN_{127}	—	October 28, 2005	Catalina	CSS	·	4.5 km	MPC · JPL
310316	2011 UQ_{131}	—	November 20, 2004	Kitt Peak	Spacewatch	·	1.2 km	MPC · JPL
310317	2011 UN_{134}	—	November 9, 2007	Kitt Peak	Spacewatch	MIS	2.7 km	MPC · JPL
310318	2011 UP_{134}	—	September 17, 2006	Anderson Mesa	LONEOS	·	2.1 km	MPC · JPL
310319	2011 UC_{141}	—	May 28, 2000	Socorro	LINEAR	·	2.4 km	MPC · JPL
310320	2011 UO_{149}	—	October 23, 1997	Kitt Peak	Spacewatch	V	690 m	MPC · JPL
310321	2011 UW_{157}	—	February 9, 2005	Mount Lemmon	Mount Lemmon Survey	MAS	800 m	MPC · JPL
310322	2011 UP_{160}	—	October 4, 2005	Catalina	CSS	·	3.7 km	MPC · JPL
310323	2011 UW_{160}	—	April 16, 2005	Kitt Peak	Spacewatch	·	1.4 km	MPC · JPL
310324	2011 UD_{161}	—	April 25, 2003	Kitt Peak	Spacewatch	·	1.1 km	MPC · JPL
310325	2011 UT_{161}	—	September 5, 2002	Socorro	LINEAR	·	1.6 km	MPC · JPL
310326	2011 UO_{164}	—	February 10, 2002	Socorro	LINEAR	·	1.1 km	MPC · JPL
310327	2011 UX_{177}	—	October 9, 2004	Kitt Peak	Spacewatch	·	2.4 km	MPC · JPL
310328	2011 UA_{178}	—	November 16, 2000	Kitt Peak	Spacewatch	MAS	920 m	MPC · JPL
310329	2011 UW_{178}	—	September 18, 2006	Catalina	CSS	·	2.4 km	MPC · JPL
310330	2011 UJ_{180}	—	May 12, 2004	Siding Spring	SSS	TEL	2.3 km	MPC · JPL
310331	2011 UQ_{180}	—	February 1, 2000	Kitt Peak	Spacewatch	·	1.9 km	MPC · JPL
310332	2011 UP_{181}	—	August 13, 2002	Palomar	NEAT	·	2.8 km	MPC · JPL
310333	2011 UO_{182}	—	October 9, 2004	Anderson Mesa	LONEOS	·	1.1 km	MPC · JPL
310334	2011 UL_{183}	—	May 3, 2009	Kitt Peak	Spacewatch	·	4.6 km	MPC · JPL
310335	2011 UT_{191}	—	August 3, 2000	Socorro	LINEAR	·	1.5 km	MPC · JPL
310336	2011 UZ_{195}	—	July 21, 2004	Siding Spring	SSS	·	3.5 km	MPC · JPL
310337	2011 UC_{197}	—	September 25, 2005	Catalina	CSS	·	4.2 km	MPC · JPL
310338	2011 UW_{200}	—	August 11, 1997	Kitt Peak	Spacewatch	·	2.1 km	MPC · JPL
310339	2011 UZ_{200}	—	September 10, 2007	Mount Lemmon	Mount Lemmon Survey	MAS	820 m	MPC · JPL
310340	2011 UJ_{202}	—	April 30, 2004	Kitt Peak	Spacewatch	·	3.9 km	MPC · JPL
310341	2011 UJ_{206}	—	April 30, 2005	Kitt Peak	Spacewatch	·	2.2 km	MPC · JPL
310342	2011 UW_{206}	—	September 30, 2005	Mauna Kea	A. Boattini	·	1.1 km	MPC · JPL
310343	2011 UU_{216}	—	June 24, 1997	Caussols	ODAS	·	2.0 km	MPC · JPL
310344	2011 UP_{239}	—	August 9, 2007	Kitt Peak	Spacewatch	MAS	700 m	MPC · JPL
310345	2011 UV_{241}	—	September 30, 2005	Anderson Mesa	LONEOS	·	3.9 km	MPC · JPL
310346	2011 UL_{244}	—	September 14, 2002	Haleakala	NEAT	·	1.9 km	MPC · JPL
310347	2011 UL_{245}	—	December 4, 2000	Haleakala	NEAT	THB	4.0 km	MPC · JPL
310348	2011 UQ_{247}	—	September 22, 2000	Kitt Peak	Spacewatch	·	1.2 km	MPC · JPL
310349	2011 UQ_{249}	—	August 8, 2002	Palomar	NEAT	·	1.4 km	MPC · JPL
310350	2011 UY_{250}	—	November 16, 2006	Mount Lemmon	Mount Lemmon Survey	·	3.4 km	MPC · JPL
310351	2011 UL_{254}	—	November 3, 2000	Kitt Peak	Spacewatch	THM	2.3 km	MPC · JPL
310352	2011 UW_{254}	—	November 11, 2007	Mount Lemmon	Mount Lemmon Survey	EOS	2.4 km	MPC · JPL
310353	2011 UQ_{257}	—	September 15, 2006	Kitt Peak	Spacewatch	·	2.4 km	MPC · JPL
310354	2011 UD_{259}	—	October 2, 2002	Kvistaberg	Uppsala-DLR Asteroid Survey	·	1.6 km	MPC · JPL
310355	2011 UY_{263}	—	May 4, 2005	Kitt Peak	Spacewatch	·	2.5 km	MPC · JPL
310356	2011 UM_{264}	—	August 8, 2007	Socorro	LINEAR	V	880 m	MPC · JPL
310357	2011 UE_{266}	—	August 31, 2005	Palomar	NEAT	·	3.6 km	MPC · JPL
310358	2011 UH_{270}	—	May 24, 2006	Mount Lemmon	Mount Lemmon Survey	MRX	1.3 km	MPC · JPL
310359	2011 UQ_{274}	—	September 30, 2005	Anderson Mesa	LONEOS	VER	3.7 km	MPC · JPL
310360	2011 UL_{280}	—	November 25, 2006	Mount Lemmon	Mount Lemmon Survey	·	4.0 km	MPC · JPL
310361	2011 UE_{281}	—	January 22, 1998	Kitt Peak	Spacewatch	·	1.6 km	MPC · JPL
310362	2011 UE_{288}	—	November 13, 1998	Caussols	ODAS	EUN	1.6 km	MPC · JPL
310363	2011 UX_{334}	—	April 14, 2010	Mount Lemmon	Mount Lemmon Survey	·	2.8 km	MPC · JPL
310364	2011 UH_{335}	—	February 9, 2005	Mount Lemmon	Mount Lemmon Survey	MAR	1.7 km	MPC · JPL
310365	2011 UN_{335}	—	July 17, 2002	Palomar	NEAT	·	2.2 km	MPC · JPL
310366	2011 UQ_{335}	—	March 26, 2003	Palomar	NEAT	·	1.2 km	MPC · JPL
310367	2011 UT_{335}	—	October 25, 1995	Kitt Peak	Spacewatch	·	770 m	MPC · JPL
310368	2011 UQ_{336}	—	February 16, 2004	Kitt Peak	Spacewatch	·	4.0 km	MPC · JPL
310369	2011 UE_{337}	—	October 17, 2006	Catalina	CSS	·	2.3 km	MPC · JPL
310370	2011 UF_{337}	—	October 1, 2000	Socorro	LINEAR	·	3.4 km	MPC · JPL
310371	2011 UM_{337}	—	October 11, 2001	Palomar	NEAT	·	2.2 km	MPC · JPL
310372	2011 UM_{338}	—	July 16, 2002	Palomar	NEAT	EUN	1.9 km	MPC · JPL
310373	2718 P-L	—	September 24, 1960	Palomar	C. J. van Houten, I. van Houten-Groeneveld, T. Gehrels	·	1.9 km	MPC · JPL
310374	1046 T-2	—	September 29, 1973	Palomar	C. J. van Houten, I. van Houten-Groeneveld, T. Gehrels	·	1.3 km	MPC · JPL
310375	2639 T-3	—	October 16, 1977	Palomar	C. J. van Houten, I. van Houten-Groeneveld, T. Gehrels	(5)	1.4 km	MPC · JPL
310376	3318 T-3	—	October 16, 1977	Palomar	C. J. van Houten, I. van Houten-Groeneveld, T. Gehrels	NYS	1.4 km	MPC · JPL
310377	1993 UK_{5}	—	October 20, 1993	La Silla	E. W. Elst	·	1.2 km	MPC · JPL
310378	1994 EM_{8}	—	March 6, 1994	Kitt Peak	Spacewatch	·	2.0 km	MPC · JPL
310379	1994 NZ	—	July 4, 1994	Palomar	E. F. Helin	·	2.2 km	MPC · JPL
310380	1994 RS_{8}	—	September 12, 1994	Kitt Peak	Spacewatch	·	670 m	MPC · JPL
310381	1994 SV_{5}	—	September 28, 1994	Kitt Peak	Spacewatch	·	2.4 km	MPC · JPL
310382	1995 QD_{6}	—	August 22, 1995	Kitt Peak	Spacewatch	L4	11 km	MPC · JPL
310383	1995 SM	—	September 17, 1995	Ondřejov	M. Wolf	·	1.4 km	MPC · JPL
310384	1995 SQ_{21}	—	September 19, 1995	Kitt Peak	Spacewatch	NYS	1.8 km	MPC · JPL
310385	1995 SH_{43}	—	September 25, 1995	Kitt Peak	Spacewatch	·	1.4 km	MPC · JPL
310386	1996 XC_{4}	—	December 4, 1996	Kitt Peak	Spacewatch	·	840 m	MPC · JPL
310387	1997 WT_{11}	—	November 22, 1997	Kitt Peak	Spacewatch	·	2.0 km	MPC · JPL
310388	1997 YY_{15}	—	December 29, 1997	Kitt Peak	Spacewatch	·	690 m	MPC · JPL
310389	1998 DO_{19}	—	February 24, 1998	Kitt Peak	Spacewatch	·	1.1 km	MPC · JPL
310390	1998 HC_{2}	—	April 17, 1998	Modra	A. Galád, Pravda, A.	·	2.2 km	MPC · JPL
310391	1998 HK_{156}	—	April 21, 1998	Socorro	LINEAR	(18466)	3.2 km	MPC · JPL
310392	1998 MU_{16}	—	June 27, 1998	Kitt Peak	Spacewatch	(5)	1.4 km	MPC · JPL
310393	1998 RU_{3}	—	September 14, 1998	Socorro	LINEAR	·	3.0 km	MPC · JPL
310394	1998 RO_{47}	—	September 14, 1998	Socorro	LINEAR	·	1.1 km	MPC · JPL
310395	1998 TM_{15}	—	October 14, 1998	Caussols	ODAS	·	660 m	MPC · JPL
310396	1998 VS_{40}	—	November 14, 1998	Kitt Peak	Spacewatch	·	1.9 km	MPC · JPL
310397	1998 WF_{37}	—	November 15, 1998	Kitt Peak	Spacewatch	L4	10 km	MPC · JPL
310398	1999 AA_{3}	—	January 9, 1999	Kitt Peak	Spacewatch	·	1.8 km	MPC · JPL
310399	1999 CC_{7}	—	February 10, 1999	Socorro	LINEAR	H	730 m	MPC · JPL
310400	1999 CW_{29}	—	February 10, 1999	Socorro	LINEAR	·	2.8 km	MPC · JPL

== 310401–310500 ==
back to top

Designation			Discovery			Properties		Ref
Permanent	Provisional	Named after	Date	Site	Discoverer(s)	Category	Diam.	Ref
310401	1999 CW_{79}	—	February 12, 1999	Socorro	LINEAR	·	3.3 km	MPC · JPL
310402	1999 EE_{5}	—	March 15, 1999	Socorro	LINEAR	AMO	660 m	MPC · JPL
310403	1999 LF	—	June 4, 1999	Catalina	CSS	H	870 m	MPC · JPL
310404	1999 RL_{1}	—	September 5, 1999	Catalina	CSS	·	1.2 km	MPC · JPL
310405	1999 RR_{37}	—	September 10, 1999	Kitt Peak	Spacewatch	·	1.2 km	MPC · JPL
310406	1999 RL_{198}	—	September 9, 1999	Socorro	LINEAR	·	1.9 km	MPC · JPL
310407	1999 ST_{22}	—	September 30, 1999	Catalina	CSS	NYS	1.4 km	MPC · JPL
310408	1999 TG_{43}	—	October 3, 1999	Kitt Peak	Spacewatch	·	1.2 km	MPC · JPL
310409	1999 TG_{78}	—	October 11, 1999	Kitt Peak	Spacewatch	·	2.3 km	MPC · JPL
310410	1999 TO_{80}	—	October 11, 1999	Kitt Peak	Spacewatch	THM	2.1 km	MPC · JPL
310411	1999 TO_{125}	—	October 4, 1999	Socorro	LINEAR	NYS	1.6 km	MPC · JPL
310412	1999 TE_{129}	—	October 6, 1999	Socorro	LINEAR	·	1.2 km	MPC · JPL
310413	1999 TN_{150}	—	October 7, 1999	Socorro	LINEAR	·	2.1 km	MPC · JPL
310414	1999 TS_{150}	—	October 7, 1999	Socorro	LINEAR	·	1.5 km	MPC · JPL
310415	1999 TW_{175}	—	October 10, 1999	Socorro	LINEAR	·	1.6 km	MPC · JPL
310416	1999 TT_{202}	—	October 13, 1999	Socorro	LINEAR	·	1.8 km	MPC · JPL
310417	1999 TK_{293}	—	October 12, 1999	Socorro	LINEAR	·	1.9 km	MPC · JPL
310418	1999 UX_{28}	—	October 31, 1999	Kitt Peak	Spacewatch	NYS	1.2 km	MPC · JPL
310419	1999 UO_{33}	—	October 31, 1999	Kitt Peak	Spacewatch	NYS	1.2 km	MPC · JPL
310420	1999 VV_{3}	—	November 1, 1999	Kitt Peak	Spacewatch	·	4.0 km	MPC · JPL
310421	1999 VD_{80}	—	November 4, 1999	Socorro	LINEAR	MAS	960 m	MPC · JPL
310422	1999 VK_{98}	—	October 29, 1999	Kitt Peak	Spacewatch	·	3.5 km	MPC · JPL
310423	1999 VA_{104}	—	November 9, 1999	Socorro	LINEAR	·	1.4 km	MPC · JPL
310424	1999 VX_{120}	—	November 4, 1999	Kitt Peak	Spacewatch	·	3.7 km	MPC · JPL
310425	1999 VV_{135}	—	November 9, 1999	Socorro	LINEAR	NYS	1.7 km	MPC · JPL
310426	1999 VU_{154}	—	November 12, 1999	Kitt Peak	Spacewatch	·	1.6 km	MPC · JPL
310427	1999 VA_{186}	—	November 15, 1999	Socorro	LINEAR	·	1.6 km	MPC · JPL
310428	1999 WV_{18}	—	November 30, 1999	Kitt Peak	Spacewatch	·	1.4 km	MPC · JPL
310429	1999 XP_{19}	—	December 5, 1999	Socorro	LINEAR	·	2.7 km	MPC · JPL
310430	1999 XK_{139}	—	December 2, 1999	Kitt Peak	Spacewatch	·	1.7 km	MPC · JPL
310431	1999 XT_{218}	—	December 15, 1999	Kitt Peak	Spacewatch	·	1.5 km	MPC · JPL
310432	1999 XN_{226}	—	December 14, 1999	Kitt Peak	Spacewatch	L4	14 km	MPC · JPL
310433	2000 AH_{1}	—	January 13, 2000	Kitt Peak	Spacewatch	L4	14 km	MPC · JPL
310434	2000 AP_{146}	—	January 7, 2000	Socorro	LINEAR	·	3.1 km	MPC · JPL
310435	2000 AV_{156}	—	January 3, 2000	Socorro	LINEAR	·	1.7 km	MPC · JPL
310436	2000 AB_{169}	—	January 7, 2000	Socorro	LINEAR	·	3.5 km	MPC · JPL
310437	2000 AZ_{206}	—	January 3, 2000	Kitt Peak	Spacewatch	·	4.7 km	MPC · JPL
310438	2000 AS_{234}	—	January 5, 2000	Socorro	LINEAR	·	1.9 km	MPC · JPL
310439	2000 AT_{253}	—	January 7, 2000	Kitt Peak	Spacewatch	L4	10 km	MPC · JPL
310440	2000 BL_{2}	—	January 25, 2000	Socorro	LINEAR	slow	3.5 km	MPC · JPL
310441	2000 BH_{34}	—	January 30, 2000	Catalina	CSS	·	1.7 km	MPC · JPL
310442	2000 CH_{59}	—	February 6, 2000	Socorro	LINEAR	ATE · PHA	390 m	MPC · JPL
310443	2000 CF_{111}	—	February 6, 2000	Kitt Peak	M. W. Buie	·	1.2 km	MPC · JPL
310444	2000 DV_{32}	—	February 29, 2000	Socorro	LINEAR	·	1.2 km	MPC · JPL
310445	2000 DH_{100}	—	February 29, 2000	Socorro	LINEAR	·	1.6 km	MPC · JPL
310446	2000 GR_{163}	—	April 10, 2000	Haleakala	NEAT	·	3.3 km	MPC · JPL
310447	2000 HL_{59}	—	April 25, 2000	Anderson Mesa	LONEOS	·	2.1 km	MPC · JPL
310448	2000 JS_{9}	—	May 3, 2000	Socorro	LINEAR	BAR	1.5 km	MPC · JPL
310449	2000 LC_{3}	—	June 4, 2000	Modra	L. Kornoš, P. Kolény	·	2.0 km	MPC · JPL
310450	2000 LV_{29}	—	June 5, 2000	Kitt Peak	Spacewatch	ADE	3.9 km	MPC · JPL
310451	2000 PT_{27}	—	August 9, 2000	Socorro	LINEAR	PHO	2.0 km	MPC · JPL
310452	2000 QT_{6}	—	August 23, 2000	Reedy Creek	J. Broughton	·	990 m	MPC · JPL
310453	2000 QX_{20}	—	August 24, 2000	Socorro	LINEAR	NYS	950 m	MPC · JPL
310454	2000 QQ_{41}	—	August 24, 2000	Socorro	LINEAR	·	1.0 km	MPC · JPL
310455	2000 QR_{43}	—	August 24, 2000	Socorro	LINEAR	·	950 m	MPC · JPL
310456	2000 QM_{147}	—	August 26, 2000	Socorro	LINEAR	H	770 m	MPC · JPL
310457	2000 QU_{147}	—	August 31, 2000	Socorro	LINEAR	H	730 m	MPC · JPL
310458	2000 QA_{180}	—	August 28, 2000	Socorro	LINEAR	·	1.8 km	MPC · JPL
310459	2000 QS_{216}	—	August 31, 2000	Socorro	LINEAR	·	940 m	MPC · JPL
310460	2000 QA_{228}	—	August 31, 2000	Socorro	LINEAR	·	1.2 km	MPC · JPL
310461	2000 QD_{228}	—	August 31, 2000	Socorro	LINEAR	·	1.5 km	MPC · JPL
310462	2000 QW_{254}	—	August 20, 2000	Kitt Peak	Spacewatch	·	880 m	MPC · JPL
310463	2000 RE_{40}	—	September 3, 2000	Socorro	LINEAR	·	4.2 km	MPC · JPL
310464	2000 SF	—	September 18, 2000	Socorro	LINEAR	·	2.5 km	MPC · JPL
310465	2000 ST_{9}	—	September 23, 2000	Socorro	LINEAR	·	5.7 km	MPC · JPL
310466	2000 ST_{12}	—	September 20, 2000	Socorro	LINEAR	·	1.2 km	MPC · JPL
310467	2000 SB_{24}	—	September 24, 2000	Socorro	LINEAR	PHO	1.4 km	MPC · JPL
310468	2000 SK_{51}	—	September 23, 2000	Socorro	LINEAR	·	940 m	MPC · JPL
310469	2000 SV_{53}	—	September 24, 2000	Socorro	LINEAR	NYS	960 m	MPC · JPL
310470	2000 SX_{86}	—	September 24, 2000	Socorro	LINEAR	·	1.3 km	MPC · JPL
310471	2000 SS_{102}	—	September 24, 2000	Socorro	LINEAR	·	990 m	MPC · JPL
310472	2000 SA_{129}	—	September 25, 2000	Socorro	LINEAR	V	820 m	MPC · JPL
310473	2000 SA_{133}	—	September 23, 2000	Socorro	LINEAR	·	1.9 km	MPC · JPL
310474	2000 SL_{133}	—	September 23, 2000	Socorro	LINEAR	·	1.4 km	MPC · JPL
310475	2000 SV_{167}	—	September 23, 2000	Socorro	LINEAR	V	990 m	MPC · JPL
310476	2000 SU_{168}	—	September 23, 2000	Socorro	LINEAR	(2076)	1.1 km	MPC · JPL
310477	2000 SG_{211}	—	September 25, 2000	Socorro	LINEAR	·	1.2 km	MPC · JPL
310478	2000 SY_{242}	—	September 24, 2000	Socorro	LINEAR	PHO	1.1 km	MPC · JPL
310479	2000 SK_{245}	—	September 24, 2000	Socorro	LINEAR	·	940 m	MPC · JPL
310480	2000 SB_{246}	—	September 24, 2000	Socorro	LINEAR	·	1.0 km	MPC · JPL
310481	2000 SA_{248}	—	September 24, 2000	Socorro	LINEAR	·	1.7 km	MPC · JPL
310482	2000 SX_{280}	—	September 26, 2000	Socorro	LINEAR	H	830 m	MPC · JPL
310483	2000 SZ_{289}	—	September 27, 2000	Socorro	LINEAR	·	1.2 km	MPC · JPL
310484	2000 SZ_{302}	—	September 28, 2000	Socorro	LINEAR	·	1.1 km	MPC · JPL
310485	2000 SD_{344}	—	September 22, 2000	Haleakala	NEAT	·	1.3 km	MPC · JPL
310486	2000 SB_{361}	—	September 23, 2000	Anderson Mesa	LONEOS	·	1.4 km	MPC · JPL
310487	2000 SB_{362}	—	September 23, 2000	Anderson Mesa	LONEOS	·	1.2 km	MPC · JPL
310488	2000 TV_{30}	—	October 3, 2000	Kitt Peak	Spacewatch	NYS	1.3 km	MPC · JPL
310489	2000 TD_{62}	—	October 2, 2000	Anderson Mesa	LONEOS	TEL	1.8 km	MPC · JPL
310490	2000 UR_{1}	—	October 19, 2000	Kitt Peak	Spacewatch	·	870 m	MPC · JPL
310491	2000 UT_{12}	—	October 25, 2000	Socorro	LINEAR	·	1.4 km	MPC · JPL
310492	2000 UK_{26}	—	October 24, 2000	Socorro	LINEAR	PHO	1.2 km	MPC · JPL
310493	2000 UZ_{30}	—	October 29, 2000	Kitt Peak	Spacewatch	·	1.4 km	MPC · JPL
310494	2000 UC_{34}	—	October 24, 2000	Socorro	LINEAR	·	1.1 km	MPC · JPL
310495	2000 UD_{36}	—	October 24, 2000	Socorro	LINEAR	·	1.1 km	MPC · JPL
310496	2000 UY_{72}	—	October 25, 2000	Socorro	LINEAR	NYS	1.0 km	MPC · JPL
310497	2000 UJ_{83}	—	October 30, 2000	Socorro	LINEAR	·	1.4 km	MPC · JPL
310498	2000 UJ_{93}	—	October 25, 2000	Socorro	LINEAR	V	930 m	MPC · JPL
310499	2000 UV_{114}	—	October 25, 2000	Socorro	LINEAR	·	1.4 km	MPC · JPL
310500	2000 VM_{21}	—	November 1, 2000	Socorro	LINEAR	·	1.6 km	MPC · JPL

== 310501–310600 ==
back to top

Designation			Discovery			Properties		Ref
Permanent	Provisional	Named after	Date	Site	Discoverer(s)	Category	Diam.	Ref
310501	2000 VG_{56}	—	November 3, 2000	Socorro	LINEAR	TIR	4.4 km	MPC · JPL
310502	2000 WN_{7}	—	November 20, 2000	Socorro	LINEAR	·	2.7 km	MPC · JPL
310503	2000 WZ_{15}	—	November 21, 2000	Socorro	LINEAR	·	1.3 km	MPC · JPL
310504	2000 WN_{16}	—	November 21, 2000	Socorro	LINEAR	·	1.3 km	MPC · JPL
310505	2000 WA_{17}	—	November 21, 2000	Socorro	LINEAR	·	2.9 km	MPC · JPL
310506	2000 WL_{27}	—	November 25, 2000	Kitt Peak	Spacewatch	·	930 m	MPC · JPL
310507	2000 WU_{56}	—	November 21, 2000	Socorro	LINEAR	·	1.8 km	MPC · JPL
310508	2000 WP_{75}	—	November 20, 2000	Socorro	LINEAR	V	920 m	MPC · JPL
310509	2000 WF_{102}	—	November 26, 2000	Socorro	LINEAR	·	3.2 km	MPC · JPL
310510	2000 WV_{112}	—	November 20, 2000	Socorro	LINEAR	·	2.8 km	MPC · JPL
310511	2000 WG_{147}	—	November 29, 2000	Haleakala	NEAT	·	1.4 km	MPC · JPL
310512	2000 WL_{148}	—	November 29, 2000	Kitt Peak	Spacewatch	TIR	3.3 km	MPC · JPL
310513	2000 WF_{174}	—	November 26, 2000	Socorro	LINEAR	·	1.6 km	MPC · JPL
310514	2000 XK_{15}	—	December 5, 2000	Bohyunsan	Jeon, Y.-B., Lee, B.-C.	TIR	4.3 km	MPC · JPL
310515	2000 XS_{18}	—	December 4, 2000	Socorro	LINEAR	·	1.2 km	MPC · JPL
310516	2000 XW_{22}	—	December 4, 2000	Socorro	LINEAR	·	5.3 km	MPC · JPL
310517	2000 XS_{48}	—	December 4, 2000	Socorro	LINEAR	·	7.7 km	MPC · JPL
310518	2000 YF_{13}	—	December 21, 2000	Kitt Peak	Spacewatch	·	1.2 km	MPC · JPL
310519	2000 YW_{32}	—	December 30, 2000	Socorro	LINEAR	H	850 m	MPC · JPL
310520	2000 YH_{38}	—	December 30, 2000	Socorro	LINEAR	·	4.1 km	MPC · JPL
310521	2000 YC_{57}	—	December 30, 2000	Socorro	LINEAR	·	1.7 km	MPC · JPL
310522	2000 YS_{66}	—	December 30, 2000	Socorro	LINEAR	·	2.0 km	MPC · JPL
310523	2000 YA_{115}	—	December 30, 2000	Socorro	LINEAR	EUP	7.2 km	MPC · JPL
310524	2000 YZ_{127}	—	December 29, 2000	Kitt Peak	Spacewatch	·	4.0 km	MPC · JPL
310525	2000 YY_{128}	—	December 29, 2000	Haleakala	NEAT	TIR	4.7 km	MPC · JPL
310526	2000 YW_{133}	—	December 31, 2000	Kitt Peak	Spacewatch	·	1.4 km	MPC · JPL
310527	2001 AP_{1}	—	January 2, 2001	Socorro	LINEAR	·	2.0 km	MPC · JPL
310528	2001 AB_{6}	—	January 2, 2001	Socorro	LINEAR	MAS	930 m	MPC · JPL
310529	2001 BO_{7}	—	January 19, 2001	Socorro	LINEAR	·	3.3 km	MPC · JPL
310530	2001 BD_{8}	—	January 19, 2001	Socorro	LINEAR	TIR	4.6 km	MPC · JPL
310531	2001 BC_{11}	—	January 16, 2001	Haleakala	NEAT	·	1.7 km	MPC · JPL
310532	2001 BB_{18}	—	January 19, 2001	Socorro	LINEAR	TIR	5.6 km	MPC · JPL
310533	2001 BN_{33}	—	January 20, 2001	Socorro	LINEAR	·	2.6 km	MPC · JPL
310534	2001 BC_{35}	—	January 20, 2001	Socorro	LINEAR	T_{j} (2.9)	4.3 km	MPC · JPL
310535	2001 BJ_{43}	—	January 19, 2001	Socorro	LINEAR	·	920 m	MPC · JPL
310536	2001 BT_{50}	—	January 27, 2001	Ondřejov	P. Kušnirák	·	4.0 km	MPC · JPL
310537	2001 BN_{52}	—	January 17, 2001	Kitt Peak	Spacewatch	·	3.7 km	MPC · JPL
310538	2001 BG_{83}	—	January 18, 2001	Socorro	LINEAR	·	1.2 km	MPC · JPL
310539	2001 CH_{22}	—	February 1, 2001	Anderson Mesa	LONEOS	EUP	6.1 km	MPC · JPL
310540	2001 CC_{28}	—	February 2, 2001	Anderson Mesa	LONEOS	EUP	6.1 km	MPC · JPL
310541	2001 DT_{3}	—	February 16, 2001	Socorro	LINEAR	T_{j} (2.97)	6.2 km	MPC · JPL
310542	2001 DW_{25}	—	February 17, 2001	Socorro	LINEAR	NYS	1.8 km	MPC · JPL
310543	2001 DX_{25}	—	February 17, 2001	Socorro	LINEAR	·	1.6 km	MPC · JPL
310544	2001 DF_{66}	—	February 19, 2001	Socorro	LINEAR	·	3.7 km	MPC · JPL
310545	2001 DF_{97}	—	February 17, 2001	Socorro	LINEAR	NYS	1.5 km	MPC · JPL
310546	2001 DE_{109}	—	February 21, 2001	Kitt Peak	Spacewatch	EUP	4.7 km	MPC · JPL
310547	2001 EX_{5}	—	March 2, 2001	Anderson Mesa	LONEOS	·	4.5 km	MPC · JPL
310548	2001 EW_{8}	—	March 2, 2001	Anderson Mesa	LONEOS	·	1.6 km	MPC · JPL
310549	2001 EF_{17}	—	March 14, 2001	Socorro	LINEAR	·	4.3 km	MPC · JPL
310550	2001 FY_{151}	—	March 24, 2001	Haleakala	NEAT	·	3.9 km	MPC · JPL
310551	2001 FC_{179}	—	March 20, 2001	Anderson Mesa	LONEOS	TIR	4.6 km	MPC · JPL
310552	2001 OT_{42}	—	July 22, 2001	Palomar	NEAT	·	2.7 km	MPC · JPL
310553	2001 OY_{42}	—	July 22, 2001	Palomar	NEAT	(32418)	2.8 km	MPC · JPL
310554	2001 PA_{19}	—	August 10, 2001	Palomar	NEAT	·	2.2 km	MPC · JPL
310555	2001 PU_{33}	—	August 10, 2001	Palomar	NEAT	·	2.6 km	MPC · JPL
310556	2001 PW_{36}	—	August 11, 2001	Palomar	NEAT	·	2.7 km	MPC · JPL
310557	2001 PJ_{40}	—	August 11, 2001	Palomar	NEAT	·	3.1 km	MPC · JPL
310558	2001 PL_{65}	—	August 12, 2001	Palomar	NEAT	·	2.0 km	MPC · JPL
310559	2001 QN_{132}	—	August 20, 2001	Socorro	LINEAR	DOR	2.6 km	MPC · JPL
310560	2001 QL_{142}	—	August 24, 2001	Anderson Mesa	LONEOS	APO +1km · PHA · moon	650 m	MPC · JPL
310561	2001 QQ_{230}	—	August 24, 2001	Anderson Mesa	LONEOS	·	2.0 km	MPC · JPL
310562	2001 RC_{15}	—	September 10, 2001	Socorro	LINEAR	·	2.5 km	MPC · JPL
310563	2001 RO_{56}	—	September 12, 2001	Socorro	LINEAR	·	2.4 km	MPC · JPL
310564	2001 RJ_{121}	—	September 12, 2001	Socorro	LINEAR	·	860 m	MPC · JPL
310565	2001 RU_{137}	—	September 12, 2001	Socorro	LINEAR	·	790 m	MPC · JPL
310566	2001 SO_{11}	—	September 16, 2001	Socorro	LINEAR	·	2.2 km	MPC · JPL
310567	2001 SD_{67}	—	September 17, 2001	Socorro	LINEAR	·	2.2 km	MPC · JPL
310568	2001 SO_{78}	—	September 19, 2001	Socorro	LINEAR	·	2.4 km	MPC · JPL
310569	2001 SD_{97}	—	September 20, 2001	Socorro	LINEAR	·	1.8 km	MPC · JPL
310570	2001 SR_{141}	—	September 16, 2001	Socorro	LINEAR	·	2.5 km	MPC · JPL
310571	2001 SB_{147}	—	September 16, 2001	Socorro	LINEAR	·	2.4 km	MPC · JPL
310572	2001 SS_{209}	—	September 19, 2001	Socorro	LINEAR	MRX	1.1 km	MPC · JPL
310573	2001 ST_{228}	—	September 19, 2001	Socorro	LINEAR	·	850 m	MPC · JPL
310574	2001 SH_{262}	—	September 19, 2001	Socorro	LINEAR	·	1.8 km	MPC · JPL
310575	2001 SZ_{332}	—	September 19, 2001	Socorro	LINEAR	AGN	1.4 km	MPC · JPL
310576	2001 SY_{341}	—	September 21, 2001	Palomar	NEAT	·	2.5 km	MPC · JPL
310577	2001 TX_{32}	—	October 14, 2001	Socorro	LINEAR	H	550 m	MPC · JPL
310578	2001 TT_{36}	—	October 14, 2001	Socorro	LINEAR	·	3.4 km	MPC · JPL
310579	2001 TL_{89}	—	October 14, 2001	Socorro	LINEAR	·	780 m	MPC · JPL
310580	2001 TX_{134}	—	October 13, 2001	Palomar	NEAT	·	3.0 km	MPC · JPL
310581	2001 TY_{202}	—	October 11, 2001	Socorro	LINEAR	·	2.9 km	MPC · JPL
310582	2001 TP_{235}	—	October 15, 2001	Palomar	NEAT	·	850 m	MPC · JPL
310583	2001 TO_{257}	—	October 10, 2001	Palomar	NEAT	·	2.4 km	MPC · JPL
310584	2001 TM_{261}	—	October 10, 2001	Palomar	NEAT	HOF	3.2 km	MPC · JPL
310585	2001 UU_{20}	—	October 18, 2001	Palomar	NEAT	·	2.8 km	MPC · JPL
310586	2001 UH_{100}	—	October 17, 2001	Socorro	LINEAR	·	730 m	MPC · JPL
310587	2001 US_{103}	—	October 20, 2001	Socorro	LINEAR	·	990 m	MPC · JPL
310588	2001 UZ_{117}	—	October 22, 2001	Socorro	LINEAR	·	870 m	MPC · JPL
310589	2001 UM_{187}	—	October 17, 2001	Palomar	NEAT	·	2.1 km	MPC · JPL
310590	2001 UE_{212}	—	October 21, 2001	Socorro	LINEAR	·	780 m	MPC · JPL
310591	2001 UE_{229}	—	October 16, 2001	Palomar	NEAT	MRX	1.5 km	MPC · JPL
310592	2001 VM_{10}	—	November 10, 2001	Socorro	LINEAR	·	2.2 km	MPC · JPL
310593	2001 VS_{67}	—	November 10, 2001	Socorro	LINEAR	BRA	1.9 km	MPC · JPL
310594	2001 VT_{82}	—	November 10, 2001	Socorro	LINEAR	·	4.5 km	MPC · JPL
310595	2001 VQ_{101}	—	November 12, 2001	Socorro	LINEAR	·	2.0 km	MPC · JPL
310596	2001 WE_{3}	—	November 16, 2001	Kitt Peak	Spacewatch	·	950 m	MPC · JPL
310597	2001 WE_{4}	—	November 18, 2001	Bisei SG Center	BATTeRS	·	2.1 km	MPC · JPL
310598	2001 WV_{32}	—	November 17, 2001	Socorro	LINEAR	·	1.9 km	MPC · JPL
310599	2001 WT_{45}	—	November 19, 2001	Socorro	LINEAR	·	2.3 km	MPC · JPL
310600	2001 WK_{77}	—	November 20, 2001	Socorro	LINEAR	AGN	1.2 km	MPC · JPL

== 310601–310700 ==
back to top

Designation			Discovery			Properties		Ref
Permanent	Provisional	Named after	Date	Site	Discoverer(s)	Category	Diam.	Ref
310601	2001 XS_{3}	—	December 9, 2001	Socorro	LINEAR	H	750 m	MPC · JPL
310602	2001 XG_{14}	—	December 9, 2001	Socorro	LINEAR	·	1.0 km	MPC · JPL
310603	2001 XZ_{21}	—	December 9, 2001	Socorro	LINEAR	·	3.0 km	MPC · JPL
310604	2001 XJ_{128}	—	December 14, 2001	Socorro	LINEAR	·	990 m	MPC · JPL
310605	2001 XF_{135}	—	December 14, 2001	Socorro	LINEAR	·	860 m	MPC · JPL
310606	2001 XH_{168}	—	December 14, 2001	Socorro	LINEAR	·	800 m	MPC · JPL
310607	2001 XW_{169}	—	December 14, 2001	Socorro	LINEAR	·	980 m	MPC · JPL
310608	2001 XB_{201}	—	December 15, 2001	Socorro	LINEAR	·	1.1 km	MPC · JPL
310609	2001 XZ_{224}	—	December 15, 2001	Socorro	LINEAR	·	2.7 km	MPC · JPL
310610	2001 XK_{240}	—	December 15, 2001	Socorro	LINEAR	·	2.4 km	MPC · JPL
310611	2001 YU_{20}	—	December 18, 2001	Socorro	LINEAR	·	1.1 km	MPC · JPL
310612	2001 YD_{58}	—	December 18, 2001	Socorro	LINEAR	·	870 m	MPC · JPL
310613	2001 YC_{141}	—	December 17, 2001	Socorro	LINEAR	·	840 m	MPC · JPL
310614	2001 YG_{156}	—	December 20, 2001	Palomar	NEAT	·	2.9 km	MPC · JPL
310615	2001 YA_{158}	—	December 18, 2001	Apache Point	SDSS	·	690 m	MPC · JPL
310616	2002 AX	—	January 5, 2002	Kitt Peak	Spacewatch	·	790 m	MPC · JPL
310617	2002 AY_{25}	—	January 8, 2002	Kitt Peak	Spacewatch	EOS	2.5 km	MPC · JPL
310618	2002 AN_{52}	—	January 9, 2002	Socorro	LINEAR	·	2.8 km	MPC · JPL
310619	2002 AB_{55}	—	January 9, 2002	Socorro	LINEAR	·	940 m	MPC · JPL
310620	2002 AT_{93}	—	January 8, 2002	Socorro	LINEAR	·	1.8 km	MPC · JPL
310621	2002 AN_{96}	—	January 8, 2002	Socorro	LINEAR	·	2.0 km	MPC · JPL
310622	2002 AL_{109}	—	January 9, 2002	Socorro	LINEAR	·	2.0 km	MPC · JPL
310623	2002 AP_{129}	—	January 14, 2002	Socorro	LINEAR	H	610 m	MPC · JPL
310624	2002 AN_{137}	—	January 9, 2002	Socorro	LINEAR	·	2.3 km	MPC · JPL
310625	2002 AU_{142}	—	January 13, 2002	Socorro	LINEAR	EOS	2.2 km	MPC · JPL
310626	2002 AG_{172}	—	January 14, 2002	Socorro	LINEAR	·	860 m	MPC · JPL
310627	2002 AS_{173}	—	January 14, 2002	Socorro	LINEAR	·	4.7 km	MPC · JPL
310628	2002 AL_{203}	—	January 8, 2002	Kitt Peak	Spacewatch	·	3.4 km	MPC · JPL
310629	2002 AV_{209}	—	January 13, 2002	Kitt Peak	Spacewatch	·	740 m	MPC · JPL
310630	2002 BH_{19}	—	January 21, 2002	Socorro	LINEAR	·	3.1 km	MPC · JPL
310631	2002 CP_{21}	—	February 5, 2002	Palomar	NEAT	·	900 m	MPC · JPL
310632	2002 CR_{64}	—	February 6, 2002	Socorro	LINEAR	EOS	2.5 km	MPC · JPL
310633	2002 CP_{128}	—	January 19, 2002	Socorro	LINEAR	·	980 m	MPC · JPL
310634	2002 CF_{156}	—	February 6, 2002	Socorro	LINEAR	·	1.1 km	MPC · JPL
310635	2002 CE_{160}	—	February 8, 2002	Socorro	LINEAR	·	1.0 km	MPC · JPL
310636	2002 CA_{164}	—	February 8, 2002	Socorro	LINEAR	·	840 m	MPC · JPL
310637	2002 CN_{165}	—	February 8, 2002	Socorro	LINEAR	·	1.1 km	MPC · JPL
310638	2002 CS_{172}	—	February 8, 2002	Socorro	LINEAR	·	4.3 km	MPC · JPL
310639	2002 CE_{173}	—	February 8, 2002	Socorro	LINEAR	·	810 m	MPC · JPL
310640	2002 CP_{195}	—	February 10, 2002	Socorro	LINEAR	·	720 m	MPC · JPL
310641	2002 CZ_{206}	—	February 10, 2002	Socorro	LINEAR	L4	13 km	MPC · JPL
310642	2002 CC_{221}	—	February 10, 2002	Socorro	LINEAR	·	1.2 km	MPC · JPL
310643	2002 CY_{221}	—	February 11, 2002	Socorro	LINEAR	EOS	2.4 km	MPC · JPL
310644	2002 CN_{229}	—	February 8, 2002	Kitt Peak	Spacewatch	·	790 m	MPC · JPL
310645	2002 CV_{229}	—	February 10, 2002	Kitt Peak	Spacewatch	L4	9.2 km	MPC · JPL
310646	2002 CW_{235}	—	February 13, 2002	Socorro	LINEAR	·	1.2 km	MPC · JPL
310647	2002 CM_{273}	—	February 8, 2002	Kitt Peak	M. W. Buie	·	890 m	MPC · JPL
310648	2002 CA_{276}	—	February 9, 2002	Kitt Peak	Spacewatch	·	1.1 km	MPC · JPL
310649	2002 CJ_{296}	—	February 10, 2002	Socorro	LINEAR	·	1.7 km	MPC · JPL
310650	2002 CR_{310}	—	February 7, 2002	Haleakala	NEAT	V	800 m	MPC · JPL
310651	2002 CF_{311}	—	February 10, 2002	Socorro	LINEAR	·	2.5 km	MPC · JPL
310652 Hansjörgdittus	2002 CX_{316}	Hansjörgdittus	February 4, 2002	Cima Ekar	ADAS	EOS	2.2 km	MPC · JPL
310653	2002 DM_{1}	—	February 18, 2002	Cima Ekar	ADAS	·	880 m	MPC · JPL
310654	2002 DU_{13}	—	February 16, 2002	Palomar	NEAT	·	3.2 km	MPC · JPL
310655	2002 DK_{20}	—	March 21, 2002	Kitt Peak	Spacewatch	L4	8.5 km	MPC · JPL
310656	2002 EO_{1}	—	March 6, 2002	Palomar	NEAT	·	5.0 km	MPC · JPL
310657	2002 EA_{4}	—	March 10, 2002	Cima Ekar	ADAS	·	2.2 km	MPC · JPL
310658	2002 EK_{43}	—	March 12, 2002	Socorro	LINEAR	·	910 m	MPC · JPL
310659	2002 EU_{56}	—	March 13, 2002	Socorro	LINEAR	·	960 m	MPC · JPL
310660	2002 ET_{63}	—	March 13, 2002	Socorro	LINEAR	·	2.1 km	MPC · JPL
310661	2002 EJ_{98}	—	March 12, 2002	Socorro	LINEAR	·	1.1 km	MPC · JPL
310662	2002 EM_{105}	—	March 9, 2002	Kitt Peak	Spacewatch	·	1.2 km	MPC · JPL
310663	2002 EH_{106}	—	March 9, 2002	Anderson Mesa	LONEOS	(2076)	1.1 km	MPC · JPL
310664	2002 EZ_{106}	—	March 9, 2002	Anderson Mesa	LONEOS	·	910 m	MPC · JPL
310665	2002 EC_{119}	—	March 10, 2002	Anderson Mesa	LONEOS	·	890 m	MPC · JPL
310666	2002 EW_{124}	—	March 12, 2002	Palomar	NEAT	L4	14 km	MPC · JPL
310667	2002 EV_{135}	—	March 14, 2002	Palomar	NEAT	·	870 m	MPC · JPL
310668	2002 EQ_{140}	—	March 12, 2002	Palomar	NEAT	L4	10 km	MPC · JPL
310669	2002 ES_{160}	—	March 11, 2002	Palomar	NEAT	·	810 m	MPC · JPL
310670	2002 EY_{162}	—	March 10, 2002	Haleakala	NEAT	L4	12 km	MPC · JPL
310671	2002 FJ_{6}	—	March 21, 2002	Socorro	LINEAR	H	650 m	MPC · JPL
310672	2002 FL_{6}	—	March 21, 2002	Socorro	LINEAR	PHO	3.1 km	MPC · JPL
310673	2002 FN_{13}	—	March 16, 2002	Socorro	LINEAR	·	950 m	MPC · JPL
310674	2002 FM_{28}	—	March 20, 2002	Socorro	LINEAR	MAS	860 m	MPC · JPL
310675	2002 FH_{31}	—	March 20, 2002	Kitt Peak	M. W. Buie	·	800 m	MPC · JPL
310676	2002 FO_{34}	—	March 20, 2002	Anderson Mesa	LONEOS	·	5.1 km	MPC · JPL
310677	2002 FE_{41}	—	March 16, 2002	Kvistaberg	Uppsala-DLR Asteroid Survey	·	900 m	MPC · JPL
310678	2002 GV_{4}	—	April 10, 2002	Palomar	NEAT	TIR	3.5 km	MPC · JPL
310679	2002 GF_{5}	—	April 10, 2002	Socorro	LINEAR	H	690 m	MPC · JPL
310680	2002 GA_{7}	—	April 12, 2002	Desert Eagle	W. K. Y. Yeung	·	4.3 km	MPC · JPL
310681	2002 GY_{26}	—	April 15, 2002	Palomar	NEAT	·	4.0 km	MPC · JPL
310682	2002 GC_{37}	—	April 2, 2002	Palomar	NEAT	·	920 m	MPC · JPL
310683	2002 GA_{53}	—	April 5, 2002	Anderson Mesa	LONEOS	·	830 m	MPC · JPL
310684	2002 GW_{86}	—	April 10, 2002	Socorro	LINEAR	·	3.7 km	MPC · JPL
310685	2002 GX_{86}	—	April 10, 2002	Socorro	LINEAR	TIR	3.8 km	MPC · JPL
310686	2002 GQ_{105}	—	April 11, 2002	Anderson Mesa	LONEOS	·	3.6 km	MPC · JPL
310687	2002 GA_{110}	—	April 9, 2002	Kvistaberg	Uppsala-DLR Asteroid Survey	·	3.4 km	MPC · JPL
310688	2002 GN_{110}	—	April 10, 2002	Socorro	LINEAR	·	830 m	MPC · JPL
310689	2002 GF_{114}	—	April 11, 2002	Socorro	LINEAR	·	1.0 km	MPC · JPL
310690	2002 GP_{127}	—	April 12, 2002	Socorro	LINEAR	EOS	2.7 km	MPC · JPL
310691	2002 GS_{142}	—	April 13, 2002	Palomar	NEAT	·	1.2 km	MPC · JPL
310692	2002 GM_{147}	—	April 13, 2002	Palomar	NEAT	V	880 m	MPC · JPL
310693	2002 GX_{150}	—	April 14, 2002	Palomar	NEAT	·	1.9 km	MPC · JPL
310694	2002 GD_{171}	—	April 10, 2002	Socorro	LINEAR	·	1.0 km	MPC · JPL
310695	2002 GP_{174}	—	April 11, 2002	Socorro	LINEAR	·	1.6 km	MPC · JPL
310696	2002 GZ_{183}	—	April 9, 2002	Palomar	NEAT	NYS	950 m	MPC · JPL
310697	2002 HZ_{13}	—	April 22, 2002	Socorro	LINEAR	T_{j} (2.98)	7.1 km	MPC · JPL
310698	2002 JH_{4}	—	May 5, 2002	Socorro	LINEAR	·	5.2 km	MPC · JPL
310699	2002 JU_{4}	—	May 5, 2002	Socorro	LINEAR	PHO	1.5 km	MPC · JPL
310700	2002 JN_{10}	—	May 6, 2002	Socorro	LINEAR	·	5.1 km	MPC · JPL

== 310701–310800 ==
back to top

Designation			Discovery			Properties		Ref
Permanent	Provisional	Named after	Date	Site	Discoverer(s)	Category	Diam.	Ref
310701	2002 JB_{37}	—	May 9, 2002	Anderson Mesa	LONEOS	·	4.8 km	MPC · JPL
310702	2002 JN_{73}	—	May 8, 2002	Socorro	LINEAR	·	3.6 km	MPC · JPL
310703	2002 JL_{116}	—	May 3, 2002	Palomar	NEAT	·	4.3 km	MPC · JPL
310704	2002 JV_{117}	—	May 4, 2002	Anderson Mesa	LONEOS	T_{j} (2.99)	8.3 km	MPC · JPL
310705	2002 JK_{119}	—	May 5, 2002	Anderson Mesa	LONEOS	·	5.1 km	MPC · JPL
310706	2002 JP_{122}	—	May 6, 2002	Socorro	LINEAR	·	4.9 km	MPC · JPL
310707	2002 LN_{31}	—	June 6, 2002	Socorro	LINEAR	·	5.4 km	MPC · JPL
310708	2002 LO_{63}	—	June 12, 2002	Palomar	NEAT	·	1.4 km	MPC · JPL
310709	2002 LT_{64}	—	August 29, 2006	Catalina	CSS	V	670 m	MPC · JPL
310710	2002 LV_{64}	—	January 13, 2005	Kitt Peak	Spacewatch	·	1.4 km	MPC · JPL
310711	2002 MM_{7}	—	December 18, 2003	Kitt Peak	Spacewatch	·	1.8 km	MPC · JPL
310712	2002 NY_{27}	—	July 13, 2002	Socorro	LINEAR	·	2.3 km	MPC · JPL
310713	2002 NG_{39}	—	July 13, 2002	Socorro	LINEAR	·	2.1 km	MPC · JPL
310714	2002 NV_{50}	—	July 14, 2002	Socorro	LINEAR	·	1.5 km	MPC · JPL
310715	2002 NQ_{59}	—	July 4, 2002	Palomar	NEAT	V	870 m	MPC · JPL
310716	2002 NS_{61}	—	July 12, 2002	Palomar	NEAT	·	1.4 km	MPC · JPL
310717	2002 NR_{71}	—	July 9, 2002	Palomar	NEAT	CYB	3.9 km	MPC · JPL
310718	2002 NF_{72}	—	July 12, 2002	Palomar	NEAT	·	1.3 km	MPC · JPL
310719	2002 NY_{72}	—	July 8, 2002	Palomar	NEAT	·	1.6 km	MPC · JPL
310720	2002 NS_{73}	—	July 12, 2002	Palomar	NEAT	·	1.5 km	MPC · JPL
310721	2002 NL_{74}	—	July 5, 2002	Palomar	NEAT	(5)	1.6 km	MPC · JPL
310722	2002 OA_{10}	—	July 21, 2002	Palomar	NEAT	·	1.3 km	MPC · JPL
310723	2002 OA_{26}	—	July 18, 2002	Palomar	NEAT	(5)	1.3 km	MPC · JPL
310724	2002 OC_{28}	—	July 22, 2002	Palomar	NEAT	·	1.2 km	MPC · JPL
310725	2002 PS_{24}	—	August 6, 2002	Palomar	NEAT	·	2.2 km	MPC · JPL
310726	2002 PE_{36}	—	August 6, 2002	Palomar	NEAT	·	1.7 km	MPC · JPL
310727	2002 PG_{36}	—	August 6, 2002	Palomar	NEAT	·	1.4 km	MPC · JPL
310728	2002 PD_{48}	—	August 10, 2002	Socorro	LINEAR	·	2.7 km	MPC · JPL
310729	2002 PB_{93}	—	August 14, 2002	Palomar	NEAT	EUN	1.9 km	MPC · JPL
310730	2002 PL_{98}	—	August 14, 2002	Socorro	LINEAR	·	1.7 km	MPC · JPL
310731	2002 PR_{105}	—	August 12, 2002	Socorro	LINEAR	·	2.0 km	MPC · JPL
310732	2002 PQ_{131}	—	August 15, 2002	Socorro	LINEAR	·	3.4 km	MPC · JPL
310733	2002 PA_{166}	—	August 8, 2002	Palomar	Lowe, A.	·	1.6 km	MPC · JPL
310734	2002 PH_{166}	—	August 9, 2002	Haleakala	Lowe, A.	·	1.9 km	MPC · JPL
310735	2002 PS_{189}	—	August 8, 2002	Palomar	NEAT	·	1.8 km	MPC · JPL
310736	2002 PU_{192}	—	August 8, 2002	Palomar	NEAT	·	1.3 km	MPC · JPL
310737	2002 QG_{24}	—	August 29, 2002	Palomar	NEAT	AMO +1km	920 m	MPC · JPL
310738	2002 QR_{39}	—	August 30, 2002	Palomar	NEAT	3:2 · SHU	4.8 km	MPC · JPL
310739	2002 QY_{46}	—	August 30, 2002	Socorro	LINEAR	·	1.5 km	MPC · JPL
310740	2002 QN_{53}	—	August 29, 2002	Palomar	S. F. Hönig	·	1.3 km	MPC · JPL
310741	2002 QQ_{53}	—	August 29, 2002	Palomar	S. F. Hönig	·	1.8 km	MPC · JPL
310742	2002 QM_{77}	—	August 29, 2002	Palomar	NEAT	·	1.2 km	MPC · JPL
310743	2002 QG_{91}	—	August 30, 2002	Palomar	NEAT	·	1.7 km	MPC · JPL
310744	2002 QH_{110}	—	August 17, 2002	Palomar	NEAT	·	1.2 km	MPC · JPL
310745	2002 QY_{127}	—	August 18, 2002	Palomar	NEAT	·	1.4 km	MPC · JPL
310746	2002 QF_{128}	—	August 29, 2002	Palomar	NEAT	NYS	1.8 km	MPC · JPL
310747	2002 QF_{141}	—	May 13, 2005	Kitt Peak	Spacewatch	·	2.0 km	MPC · JPL
310748	2002 QC_{146}	—	June 19, 2006	Mount Lemmon	Mount Lemmon Survey	·	1.5 km	MPC · JPL
310749	2002 QL_{147}	—	March 10, 2005	Mount Lemmon	Mount Lemmon Survey	NYS	1.9 km	MPC · JPL
310750	2002 RF_{5}	—	September 3, 2002	Palomar	NEAT	PHO	1.3 km	MPC · JPL
310751	2002 RB_{27}	—	September 5, 2002	Socorro	LINEAR	H	780 m	MPC · JPL
310752	2002 RM_{27}	—	September 5, 2002	Socorro	LINEAR	·	1.2 km	MPC · JPL
310753	2002 RQ_{48}	—	September 5, 2002	Socorro	LINEAR	·	2.2 km	MPC · JPL
310754	2002 RM_{50}	—	September 5, 2002	Socorro	LINEAR	·	1.6 km	MPC · JPL
310755	2002 RK_{55}	—	September 5, 2002	Anderson Mesa	LONEOS	·	1.6 km	MPC · JPL
310756	2002 RC_{68}	—	September 4, 2002	Anderson Mesa	LONEOS	T_{j} (2.98) · HIL · 3:2	6.2 km	MPC · JPL
310757	2002 RS_{89}	—	September 5, 2002	Socorro	LINEAR	3:2 · SHU	5.4 km	MPC · JPL
310758	2002 RU_{122}	—	September 8, 2002	Haleakala	NEAT	·	1.8 km	MPC · JPL
310759	2002 RV_{123}	—	September 9, 2002	Palomar	NEAT	·	1.3 km	MPC · JPL
310760	2002 RS_{157}	—	September 11, 2002	Palomar	NEAT	(5)	1.5 km	MPC · JPL
310761	2002 RF_{158}	—	September 11, 2002	Palomar	NEAT	·	1.6 km	MPC · JPL
310762	2002 RU_{186}	—	September 12, 2002	Palomar	NEAT	·	1.5 km	MPC · JPL
310763	2002 RM_{210}	—	September 15, 2002	Kitt Peak	Spacewatch	(5)	1.2 km	MPC · JPL
310764	2002 RC_{215}	—	September 13, 2002	Socorro	LINEAR	·	1.7 km	MPC · JPL
310765	2002 RJ_{223}	—	September 13, 2002	Kitt Peak	Spacewatch	(5)	1.4 km	MPC · JPL
310766	2002 RM_{224}	—	September 13, 2002	Anderson Mesa	LONEOS	·	1.9 km	MPC · JPL
310767	2002 RX_{234}	—	September 8, 2002	Haleakala	R. Matson	(5)	1.4 km	MPC · JPL
310768	2002 RC_{235}	—	September 11, 2002	Palomar	White, M., M. Collins	(5)	1.3 km	MPC · JPL
310769	2002 RJ_{245}	—	September 15, 2002	Palomar	NEAT	·	1.7 km	MPC · JPL
310770	2002 RO_{251}	—	September 8, 2002	Haleakala	NEAT	3:2	5.2 km	MPC · JPL
310771	2002 RF_{253}	—	September 14, 2002	Palomar	NEAT	·	1.4 km	MPC · JPL
310772	2002 RU_{276}	—	September 14, 2002	Palomar	NEAT	·	1.5 km	MPC · JPL
310773	2002 RS_{290}	—	September 19, 2006	Catalina	CSS	·	1.6 km	MPC · JPL
310774	2002 SO_{7}	—	September 27, 2002	Palomar	NEAT	HNS	1.4 km	MPC · JPL
310775	2002 SN_{13}	—	September 27, 2002	Palomar	NEAT	·	2.0 km	MPC · JPL
310776	2002 SH_{18}	—	September 28, 2002	Palomar	NEAT	·	1.6 km	MPC · JPL
310777	2002 ST_{19}	—	September 27, 2002	Socorro	LINEAR	·	1.3 km	MPC · JPL
310778	2002 SV_{29}	—	September 28, 2002	Haleakala	NEAT	(5)	1.9 km	MPC · JPL
310779	2002 SP_{32}	—	September 28, 2002	Haleakala	NEAT	EUN	1.5 km	MPC · JPL
310780	2002 SX_{33}	—	September 29, 2002	Haleakala	NEAT	(5)	1.6 km	MPC · JPL
310781	2002 SH_{35}	—	September 29, 2002	Haleakala	NEAT	·	1.6 km	MPC · JPL
310782	2002 SH_{36}	—	September 29, 2002	Haleakala	NEAT	·	1.5 km	MPC · JPL
310783	2002 SF_{41}	—	September 30, 2002	Haleakala	NEAT	·	2.4 km	MPC · JPL
310784	2002 SG_{41}	—	September 30, 2002	Haleakala	NEAT	MAR	1.6 km	MPC · JPL
310785	2002 SU_{44}	—	September 29, 2002	Haleakala	NEAT	·	1.6 km	MPC · JPL
310786	2002 SD_{55}	—	September 30, 2002	Socorro	LINEAR	RAF	1.3 km	MPC · JPL
310787	2002 TH_{38}	—	October 2, 2002	Socorro	LINEAR	·	2.0 km	MPC · JPL
310788	2002 TY_{123}	—	October 4, 2002	Palomar	NEAT	MAR	1.4 km	MPC · JPL
310789	2002 TY_{125}	—	October 4, 2002	Palomar	NEAT	ADE	2.7 km	MPC · JPL
310790	2002 TP_{144}	—	October 5, 2002	Socorro	LINEAR	·	1.9 km	MPC · JPL
310791	2002 TP_{149}	—	October 5, 2002	Palomar	NEAT	·	1.4 km	MPC · JPL
310792	2002 TA_{152}	—	October 5, 2002	Palomar	NEAT	(5)	1.2 km	MPC · JPL
310793	2002 TP_{160}	—	October 5, 2002	Palomar	NEAT	JUN	1.1 km	MPC · JPL
310794	2002 TO_{164}	—	October 5, 2002	Palomar	NEAT	·	2.8 km	MPC · JPL
310795	2002 TC_{169}	—	October 3, 2002	Palomar	NEAT	EUN	1.5 km	MPC · JPL
310796	2002 TR_{172}	—	October 4, 2002	Anderson Mesa	LONEOS	·	1.8 km	MPC · JPL
310797	2002 TE_{177}	—	October 5, 2002	Palomar	NEAT	(1547)	1.8 km	MPC · JPL
310798	2002 TL_{187}	—	October 4, 2002	Socorro	LINEAR	(5)	1.3 km	MPC · JPL
310799	2002 TL_{191}	—	October 5, 2002	Anderson Mesa	LONEOS	EUN	1.4 km	MPC · JPL
310800	2002 TB_{198}	—	October 4, 2002	Socorro	LINEAR	·	1.6 km	MPC · JPL

== 310801–310900 ==
back to top

Designation			Discovery			Properties		Ref
Permanent	Provisional	Named after	Date	Site	Discoverer(s)	Category	Diam.	Ref
310801	2002 TF_{199}	—	October 6, 2002	Socorro	LINEAR	·	2.1 km	MPC · JPL
310802	2002 TK_{199}	—	October 6, 2002	Socorro	LINEAR	JUN	1.3 km	MPC · JPL
310803	2002 TG_{209}	—	October 6, 2002	Socorro	LINEAR	·	2.1 km	MPC · JPL
310804	2002 TE_{238}	—	October 7, 2002	Socorro	LINEAR	·	1.3 km	MPC · JPL
310805	2002 TE_{271}	—	October 9, 2002	Socorro	LINEAR	(5)	1.8 km	MPC · JPL
310806	2002 TW_{369}	—	October 10, 2002	Apache Point	SDSS	·	1.7 km	MPC · JPL
310807	2002 TX_{381}	—	October 3, 2002	Palomar	NEAT	ADE	2.6 km	MPC · JPL
310808	2002 TZ_{382}	—	October 13, 2002	Kitt Peak	Spacewatch	·	1.7 km	MPC · JPL
310809	2002 UA_{11}	—	October 28, 2002	Kvistaberg	Uppsala-DLR Asteroid Survey	·	1.6 km	MPC · JPL
310810	2002 UH_{21}	—	October 30, 2002	Kitt Peak	Spacewatch	·	1.5 km	MPC · JPL
310811	2002 UL_{21}	—	October 30, 2002	Palomar	NEAT	MIS	2.7 km	MPC · JPL
310812	2002 UP_{68}	—	October 30, 2002	Apache Point	SDSS	·	1 km	MPC · JPL
310813	2002 UA_{69}	—	October 30, 2002	Apache Point	SDSS	·	1.6 km	MPC · JPL
310814	2002 UQ_{71}	—	October 18, 2002	Palomar	NEAT	·	1.7 km	MPC · JPL
310815	2002 US_{78}	—	November 7, 2007	Mount Lemmon	Mount Lemmon Survey	·	1.6 km	MPC · JPL
310816	2002 VM_{16}	—	November 5, 2002	Socorro	LINEAR	·	2.0 km	MPC · JPL
310817	2002 VB_{26}	—	November 5, 2002	Socorro	LINEAR	·	2.2 km	MPC · JPL
310818	2002 VB_{61}	—	November 5, 2002	Socorro	LINEAR	·	1.9 km	MPC · JPL
310819	2002 VN_{69}	—	November 11, 2002	Palomar	NEAT	·	2.3 km	MPC · JPL
310820	2002 VY_{69}	—	November 7, 2002	Socorro	LINEAR	·	2.5 km	MPC · JPL
310821	2002 VM_{73}	—	November 7, 2002	Socorro	LINEAR	·	1.6 km	MPC · JPL
310822	2002 VH_{84}	—	November 7, 2002	Socorro	LINEAR	·	2.8 km	MPC · JPL
310823	2002 VM_{104}	—	November 12, 2002	Socorro	LINEAR	·	2.3 km	MPC · JPL
310824	2002 VS_{139}	—	November 13, 2002	Palomar	NEAT	·	1.4 km	MPC · JPL
310825	2002 VR_{142}	—	November 5, 2002	Palomar	NEAT	(7744)	1.7 km	MPC · JPL
310826	2002 WR_{8}	—	November 24, 2002	Palomar	NEAT	·	1.8 km	MPC · JPL
310827	2002 WT_{22}	—	November 24, 2002	Palomar	NEAT	·	1.9 km	MPC · JPL
310828	2002 XC	—	December 1, 2002	Socorro	LINEAR	(194)	2.2 km	MPC · JPL
310829	2002 XN_{12}	—	December 3, 2002	Palomar	NEAT	·	1.9 km	MPC · JPL
310830	2002 XQ_{17}	—	December 5, 2002	Socorro	LINEAR	·	2.3 km	MPC · JPL
310831	2002 XQ_{27}	—	December 5, 2002	Socorro	LINEAR	MIS	2.6 km	MPC · JPL
310832	2002 XN_{34}	—	December 5, 2002	Haleakala	NEAT	·	2.2 km	MPC · JPL
310833	2002 XT_{38}	—	December 7, 2002	Socorro	LINEAR	·	2.7 km	MPC · JPL
310834	2002 XZ_{45}	—	December 10, 2002	Socorro	LINEAR	BAR	2.3 km	MPC · JPL
310835	2002 XS_{59}	—	December 11, 2002	Desert Moon	Stevens, B. L.	·	1.8 km	MPC · JPL
310836	2002 XQ_{65}	—	December 12, 2002	Socorro	LINEAR	·	2.0 km	MPC · JPL
310837	2002 XE_{67}	—	December 10, 2002	Palomar	NEAT	·	2.7 km	MPC · JPL
310838	2002 XS_{95}	—	December 5, 2002	Socorro	LINEAR	·	1.6 km	MPC · JPL
310839	2002 XQ_{105}	—	December 5, 2002	Socorro	LINEAR	·	2.2 km	MPC · JPL
310840	2002 YE_{32}	—	December 30, 2002	Haleakala	NEAT	·	2.0 km	MPC · JPL
310841	2003 AK_{3}	—	January 1, 2003	Socorro	LINEAR	·	2.9 km	MPC · JPL
310842	2003 AK_{18}	—	January 7, 2003	Socorro	LINEAR	ATE	390 m	MPC · JPL
310843	2003 AP_{20}	—	January 5, 2003	Socorro	LINEAR	JUN	1.6 km	MPC · JPL
310844	2003 AA_{33}	—	January 5, 2003	Socorro	LINEAR	·	1.8 km	MPC · JPL
310845	2003 AC_{56}	—	January 5, 2003	Socorro	LINEAR	·	2.4 km	MPC · JPL
310846	2003 AT_{65}	—	January 7, 2003	Socorro	LINEAR	·	1.7 km	MPC · JPL
310847	2003 AM_{66}	—	January 7, 2003	Socorro	LINEAR	·	2.6 km	MPC · JPL
310848	2003 AY_{78}	—	January 10, 2003	Kitt Peak	Spacewatch	·	2.3 km	MPC · JPL
310849	2003 AS_{90}	—	January 5, 2003	Anderson Mesa	LONEOS	·	2.4 km	MPC · JPL
310850	2003 BT	—	January 24, 2003	Palomar	NEAT	·	3.5 km	MPC · JPL
310851	2003 BP_{1}	—	January 25, 2003	Palomar	NEAT	·	3.3 km	MPC · JPL
310852	2003 BL_{2}	—	January 25, 2003	Anderson Mesa	LONEOS	·	2.7 km	MPC · JPL
310853	2003 BH_{24}	—	January 25, 2003	Palomar	NEAT	·	2.2 km	MPC · JPL
310854	2003 BK_{45}	—	January 28, 2003	Haleakala	NEAT	(1547)	1.7 km	MPC · JPL
310855	2003 BN_{49}	—	January 27, 2003	Anderson Mesa	LONEOS	·	2.2 km	MPC · JPL
310856	2003 BO_{54}	—	January 27, 2003	Haleakala	NEAT	·	2.6 km	MPC · JPL
310857	2003 BS_{55}	—	January 28, 2003	Socorro	LINEAR	·	2.5 km	MPC · JPL
310858	2003 BK_{62}	—	January 28, 2003	Palomar	NEAT	·	2.2 km	MPC · JPL
310859	2003 BK_{78}	—	January 31, 2003	Anderson Mesa	LONEOS	·	4.0 km	MPC · JPL
310860	2003 CM_{9}	—	February 2, 2003	Socorro	LINEAR	·	2.4 km	MPC · JPL
310861	2003 CG_{26}	—	February 2, 2003	Palomar	NEAT	GEF	1.5 km	MPC · JPL
310862	2003 EW_{40}	—	March 8, 2003	Palomar	NEAT	·	2.8 km	MPC · JPL
310863	2003 FM_{9}	—	March 20, 2003	Palomar	NEAT	·	2.8 km	MPC · JPL
310864	2003 FU_{9}	—	March 22, 2003	Palomar	NEAT	BRA	1.6 km	MPC · JPL
310865	2003 FO_{39}	—	March 24, 2003	Kitt Peak	Spacewatch	·	2.5 km	MPC · JPL
310866	2003 FE_{45}	—	March 24, 2003	Kitt Peak	Spacewatch	·	2.3 km	MPC · JPL
310867	2003 GF_{28}	—	April 7, 2003	Kitt Peak	Spacewatch	L4	8.4 km	MPC · JPL
310868	2003 GK_{42}	—	April 6, 2003	Anderson Mesa	LONEOS	·	2.5 km	MPC · JPL
310869	2003 GK_{47}	—	April 7, 2003	Kitt Peak	Spacewatch	·	3.3 km	MPC · JPL
310870	2003 GD_{48}	—	April 9, 2003	Palomar	NEAT	L4	10 km	MPC · JPL
310871	2003 GG_{57}	—	April 11, 2003	Kitt Peak	Spacewatch	L4	10 km	MPC · JPL
310872	2003 HF_{14}	—	April 26, 2003	Kitt Peak	Spacewatch	L4	15 km	MPC · JPL
310873	2003 HB_{26}	—	April 25, 2003	Kitt Peak	Spacewatch	·	3.5 km	MPC · JPL
310874	2003 HV_{58}	—	April 26, 2003	Kitt Peak	Spacewatch	THM	2.4 km	MPC · JPL
310875	2003 JE_{8}	—	May 2, 2003	Socorro	LINEAR	·	1.1 km	MPC · JPL
310876	2003 KV_{33}	—	May 27, 2003	Kitt Peak	Spacewatch	fast	3.1 km	MPC · JPL
310877	2003 MW_{3}	—	June 25, 2003	Palomar	NEAT	·	2.8 km	MPC · JPL
310878	2003 MB_{8}	—	June 28, 2003	Socorro	LINEAR	·	5.9 km	MPC · JPL
310879	2003 ON_{12}	—	July 26, 2003	Socorro	LINEAR	·	2.2 km	MPC · JPL
310880	2003 OS_{17}	—	July 29, 2003	Reedy Creek	J. Broughton	·	1.4 km	MPC · JPL
310881	2003 PU_{5}	—	August 1, 2003	Socorro	LINEAR	·	1.6 km	MPC · JPL
310882	2003 PH_{6}	—	August 1, 2003	Socorro	LINEAR	·	2.1 km	MPC · JPL
310883	2003 PK_{6}	—	August 1, 2003	Socorro	LINEAR	·	2.0 km	MPC · JPL
310884	2003 QU_{3}	—	August 18, 2003	Haleakala	NEAT	NYS	1.5 km	MPC · JPL
310885	2003 QX_{15}	—	August 20, 2003	Palomar	NEAT	·	1.6 km	MPC · JPL
310886	2003 QK_{24}	—	August 21, 2003	Campo Imperatore	CINEOS	V	790 m	MPC · JPL
310887	2003 QJ_{33}	—	August 22, 2003	Palomar	NEAT	NYS	1.6 km	MPC · JPL
310888	2003 QD_{45}	—	August 23, 2003	Socorro	LINEAR	·	1.4 km	MPC · JPL
310889	2003 QT_{50}	—	August 22, 2003	Palomar	NEAT	·	1.8 km	MPC · JPL
310890	2003 QO_{57}	—	August 23, 2003	Palomar	NEAT	MAS	850 m	MPC · JPL
310891	2003 QG_{89}	—	August 26, 2003	Socorro	LINEAR	·	1.4 km	MPC · JPL
310892	2003 QM_{111}	—	August 31, 2003	Socorro	LINEAR	slow	1.9 km	MPC · JPL
310893	2003 QB_{114}	—	August 22, 2003	Palomar	NEAT	·	1.2 km	MPC · JPL
310894	2003 RF_{5}	—	September 1, 2003	Socorro	LINEAR	MAS	930 m	MPC · JPL
310895	2003 RB_{6}	—	September 4, 2003	Campo Imperatore	CINEOS	·	1.5 km	MPC · JPL
310896	2003 RY_{9}	—	September 4, 2003	Socorro	LINEAR	·	1.6 km	MPC · JPL
310897	2003 RJ_{20}	—	September 15, 2003	Anderson Mesa	LONEOS	·	1.2 km	MPC · JPL
310898	2003 SD_{11}	—	September 17, 2003	Socorro	LINEAR	H	800 m	MPC · JPL
310899	2003 SX_{13}	—	September 16, 2003	Kitt Peak	Spacewatch	·	1.5 km	MPC · JPL
310900	2003 SE_{14}	—	September 17, 2003	Kitt Peak	Spacewatch	MAS	1.0 km	MPC · JPL

== 310901–311000 ==
back to top

Designation			Discovery			Properties		Ref
Permanent	Provisional	Named after	Date	Site	Discoverer(s)	Category	Diam.	Ref
310901	2003 SO_{18}	—	September 16, 2003	Kitt Peak	Spacewatch	·	1.3 km	MPC · JPL
310902	2003 SK_{26}	—	September 17, 2003	Haleakala	NEAT	·	1.5 km	MPC · JPL
310903	2003 SP_{28}	—	September 18, 2003	Palomar	NEAT	V	860 m	MPC · JPL
310904	2003 SC_{32}	—	September 16, 2003	Palomar	NEAT	H	800 m	MPC · JPL
310905	2003 SO_{42}	—	September 16, 2003	Anderson Mesa	LONEOS	·	1.6 km	MPC · JPL
310906	2003 SD_{45}	—	September 16, 2003	Anderson Mesa	LONEOS	MAS	970 m	MPC · JPL
310907	2003 SK_{45}	—	September 16, 2003	Anderson Mesa	LONEOS	ERI	2.0 km	MPC · JPL
310908	2003 SE_{50}	—	September 18, 2003	Palomar	NEAT	·	1.5 km	MPC · JPL
310909	2003 SL_{58}	—	September 17, 2003	Anderson Mesa	LONEOS	·	5.4 km	MPC · JPL
310910	2003 SJ_{66}	—	September 18, 2003	Campo Imperatore	CINEOS	·	1.3 km	MPC · JPL
310911	2003 SY_{69}	—	September 17, 2003	Kitt Peak	Spacewatch	·	2.2 km	MPC · JPL
310912	2003 SQ_{80}	—	September 19, 2003	Kitt Peak	Spacewatch	MAS	830 m	MPC · JPL
310913	2003 SF_{82}	—	August 31, 2003	Kitt Peak	Spacewatch	·	1.5 km	MPC · JPL
310914	2003 SN_{85}	—	September 16, 2003	Palomar	NEAT	EUN	1.2 km	MPC · JPL
310915	2003 SO_{93}	—	September 18, 2003	Palomar	NEAT	·	1.5 km	MPC · JPL
310916	2003 SR_{97}	—	September 19, 2003	Kitt Peak	Spacewatch	MAS	600 m	MPC · JPL
310917	2003 SL_{101}	—	September 20, 2003	Palomar	NEAT	·	2.1 km	MPC · JPL
310918	2003 SY_{106}	—	September 20, 2003	Palomar	NEAT	·	1.9 km	MPC · JPL
310919	2003 SN_{109}	—	September 20, 2003	Kitt Peak	Spacewatch	TIR	5.2 km	MPC · JPL
310920	2003 SC_{123}	—	September 18, 2003	Goodricke-Pigott	R. A. Tucker	·	1.6 km	MPC · JPL
310921	2003 SS_{135}	—	September 19, 2003	Kitt Peak	Spacewatch	·	1.5 km	MPC · JPL
310922	2003 SM_{145}	—	September 20, 2003	Palomar	NEAT	·	2.3 km	MPC · JPL
310923	2003 SR_{150}	—	September 17, 2003	Socorro	LINEAR	·	2.2 km	MPC · JPL
310924	2003 SZ_{166}	—	September 22, 2003	Socorro	LINEAR	·	2.1 km	MPC · JPL
310925	2003 ST_{175}	—	September 18, 2003	Palomar	NEAT	·	1.6 km	MPC · JPL
310926	2003 SD_{178}	—	September 19, 2003	Palomar	NEAT	·	1.7 km	MPC · JPL
310927	2003 SC_{235}	—	September 26, 2003	Socorro	LINEAR	MAS	870 m	MPC · JPL
310928	2003 SV_{236}	—	September 26, 2003	Socorro	LINEAR	SYL · CYB	5.1 km	MPC · JPL
310929	2003 SN_{241}	—	September 27, 2003	Kitt Peak	Spacewatch	MAS	570 m	MPC · JPL
310930	2003 SP_{242}	—	September 27, 2003	Kitt Peak	Spacewatch	·	1.3 km	MPC · JPL
310931	2003 SC_{268}	—	September 29, 2003	Kitt Peak	Spacewatch	MAS	940 m	MPC · JPL
310932	2003 SL_{275}	—	September 29, 2003	Socorro	LINEAR	·	1.4 km	MPC · JPL
310933	2003 SN_{286}	—	September 21, 2003	Palomar	NEAT	·	1.5 km	MPC · JPL
310934	2003 SJ_{295}	—	September 29, 2003	Anderson Mesa	LONEOS	·	1.7 km	MPC · JPL
310935	2003 SX_{313}	—	September 27, 2003	Kitt Peak	Spacewatch	MAS	730 m	MPC · JPL
310936	2003 SE_{319}	—	September 20, 2003	Kitt Peak	Spacewatch	T_{j} (2.95) · HIL · 3:2	5.6 km	MPC · JPL
310937	2003 SM_{331}	—	September 26, 2003	Apache Point	SDSS	·	1.4 km	MPC · JPL
310938	2003 SK_{332}	—	September 28, 2003	Anderson Mesa	LONEOS	NYS	1.2 km	MPC · JPL
310939	2003 SY_{358}	—	September 21, 2003	Kitt Peak	Spacewatch	·	1.0 km	MPC · JPL
310940	2003 SX_{363}	—	September 26, 2003	Apache Point	SDSS	·	1.0 km	MPC · JPL
310941	2003 SF_{388}	—	September 26, 2003	Apache Point	SDSS	NYS	1.5 km	MPC · JPL
310942	2003 SN_{396}	—	September 26, 2003	Apache Point	SDSS	V	800 m	MPC · JPL
310943	2003 TD_{10}	—	October 15, 2003	Socorro	LINEAR	H	880 m	MPC · JPL
310944	2003 TC_{12}	—	October 14, 2003	Anderson Mesa	LONEOS	·	1.6 km	MPC · JPL
310945	2003 TX_{15}	—	October 15, 2003	Anderson Mesa	LONEOS	·	1.8 km	MPC · JPL
310946	2003 TX_{28}	—	October 1, 2003	Kitt Peak	Spacewatch	NYS	1.5 km	MPC · JPL
310947	2003 UH_{2}	—	October 16, 2003	Kitt Peak	Spacewatch	·	1.1 km	MPC · JPL
310948	2003 UM_{14}	—	October 16, 2003	Anderson Mesa	LONEOS	·	1.6 km	MPC · JPL
310949	2003 UH_{15}	—	October 16, 2003	Kitt Peak	Spacewatch	NYS	1.4 km	MPC · JPL
310950	2003 UP_{26}	—	October 25, 2003	Goodricke-Pigott	R. A. Tucker	·	1.5 km	MPC · JPL
310951	2003 UT_{38}	—	October 26, 2003	Kleť	Kleť	·	1.5 km	MPC · JPL
310952	2003 UY_{51}	—	October 18, 2003	Palomar	NEAT	·	1.4 km	MPC · JPL
310953	2003 UH_{54}	—	October 18, 2003	Palomar	NEAT	V	1.0 km	MPC · JPL
310954	2003 UY_{54}	—	October 18, 2003	Palomar	NEAT	·	1.5 km	MPC · JPL
310955	2003 UB_{56}	—	October 19, 2003	Goodricke-Pigott	R. A. Tucker	NYS	1.5 km	MPC · JPL
310956	2003 UL_{75}	—	October 17, 2003	Anderson Mesa	LONEOS	·	1.6 km	MPC · JPL
310957	2003 UX_{94}	—	October 18, 2003	Kitt Peak	Spacewatch	·	1.1 km	MPC · JPL
310958	2003 UH_{97}	—	October 19, 2003	Kitt Peak	Spacewatch	NYS	1.4 km	MPC · JPL
310959	2003 UO_{98}	—	October 19, 2003	Anderson Mesa	LONEOS	·	1.4 km	MPC · JPL
310960	2003 UB_{108}	—	October 19, 2003	Palomar	NEAT	·	2.2 km	MPC · JPL
310961	2003 UZ_{110}	—	October 19, 2003	Kitt Peak	Spacewatch	·	1.2 km	MPC · JPL
310962	2003 UW_{116}	—	October 21, 2003	Socorro	LINEAR	NYS	1.4 km	MPC · JPL
310963	2003 UQ_{119}	—	October 18, 2003	Kitt Peak	Spacewatch	(6769)	1.3 km	MPC · JPL
310964	2003 UE_{120}	—	October 18, 2003	Kitt Peak	Spacewatch	PHO	940 m	MPC · JPL
310965	2003 US_{126}	—	October 20, 2003	Palomar	NEAT	·	1.8 km	MPC · JPL
310966	2003 US_{132}	—	October 19, 2003	Palomar	NEAT	KON	3.3 km	MPC · JPL
310967	2003 UK_{139}	—	October 16, 2003	Palomar	NEAT	·	1.5 km	MPC · JPL
310968	2003 US_{144}	—	October 18, 2003	Anderson Mesa	LONEOS	·	1.7 km	MPC · JPL
310969	2003 UF_{174}	—	October 21, 2003	Kitt Peak	Spacewatch	NYS	1.4 km	MPC · JPL
310970	2003 UA_{182}	—	October 21, 2003	Socorro	LINEAR	·	1.5 km	MPC · JPL
310971	2003 UG_{204}	—	October 21, 2003	Kitt Peak	Spacewatch	NYS	1.5 km	MPC · JPL
310972	2003 UE_{217}	—	October 21, 2003	Socorro	LINEAR	NYS	1.7 km	MPC · JPL
310973	2003 UN_{228}	—	October 23, 2003	Kitt Peak	Spacewatch	NYS ·	1.3 km	MPC · JPL
310974	2003 UE_{231}	—	October 24, 2003	Socorro	LINEAR	·	1.2 km	MPC · JPL
310975	2003 UA_{240}	—	October 24, 2003	Socorro	LINEAR	·	1.2 km	MPC · JPL
310976	2003 UB_{270}	—	October 27, 2003	Bergisch Gladbach	W. Bickel	·	1.2 km	MPC · JPL
310977	2003 UE_{272}	—	October 29, 2003	Socorro	LINEAR	V	910 m	MPC · JPL
310978	2003 UE_{278}	—	October 25, 2003	Socorro	LINEAR	·	1.8 km	MPC · JPL
310979	2003 UR_{297}	—	October 16, 2003	Kitt Peak	Spacewatch	CLA	1.7 km	MPC · JPL
310980	2003 UV_{307}	—	October 18, 2003	Kitt Peak	Spacewatch	·	1.3 km	MPC · JPL
310981	2003 UP_{328}	—	October 17, 2003	Apache Point	SDSS	·	1.4 km	MPC · JPL
310982	2003 UZ_{331}	—	October 18, 2003	Apache Point	SDSS	·	1.5 km	MPC · JPL
310983	2003 UM_{341}	—	July 22, 2003	Palomar	NEAT	CYB	6.1 km	MPC · JPL
310984	2003 UH_{349}	—	October 19, 2003	Apache Point	SDSS	NYS	1.1 km	MPC · JPL
310985	2003 UO_{369}	—	November 9, 1993	Kitt Peak	Spacewatch	·	1.1 km	MPC · JPL
310986	2003 UG_{383}	—	October 22, 2003	Apache Point	SDSS	·	1.1 km	MPC · JPL
310987	2003 WP_{10}	—	November 18, 2003	Kitt Peak	Spacewatch	·	1.4 km	MPC · JPL
310988	2003 WM_{39}	—	November 19, 2003	Kitt Peak	Spacewatch	·	1.7 km	MPC · JPL
310989	2003 WO_{54}	—	November 20, 2003	Socorro	LINEAR	·	1.2 km	MPC · JPL
310990	2003 WV_{81}	—	November 18, 2003	Palomar	NEAT	·	1.6 km	MPC · JPL
310991	2003 WH_{84}	—	November 19, 2003	Socorro	LINEAR	·	1.6 km	MPC · JPL
310992	2003 WH_{90}	—	November 16, 2003	Kitt Peak	Spacewatch	·	1.6 km	MPC · JPL
310993	2003 WR_{90}	—	November 18, 2003	Palomar	NEAT	·	1.7 km	MPC · JPL
310994	2003 WG_{100}	—	November 20, 2003	Socorro	LINEAR	T_{j} (2.99) · 3:2 · SHU	5.7 km	MPC · JPL
310995	2003 WQ_{122}	—	November 20, 2003	Socorro	LINEAR	(5)	1.4 km	MPC · JPL
310996	2003 WZ_{129}	—	November 21, 2003	Palomar	NEAT	·	1.6 km	MPC · JPL
310997	2003 WT_{141}	—	November 21, 2003	Socorro	LINEAR	H	770 m	MPC · JPL
310998	2003 WT_{144}	—	November 21, 2003	Socorro	LINEAR	·	1.7 km	MPC · JPL
310999	2003 WF_{150}	—	November 24, 2003	Anderson Mesa	LONEOS	TIR	4.8 km	MPC · JPL
311000	2003 WT_{157}	—	November 30, 2003	Socorro	LINEAR	H	740 m	MPC · JPL

back to top

== See also ==
- Meanings of minor-planet names: 310001–311000
