= Hansjörg Dittus =

German physicist

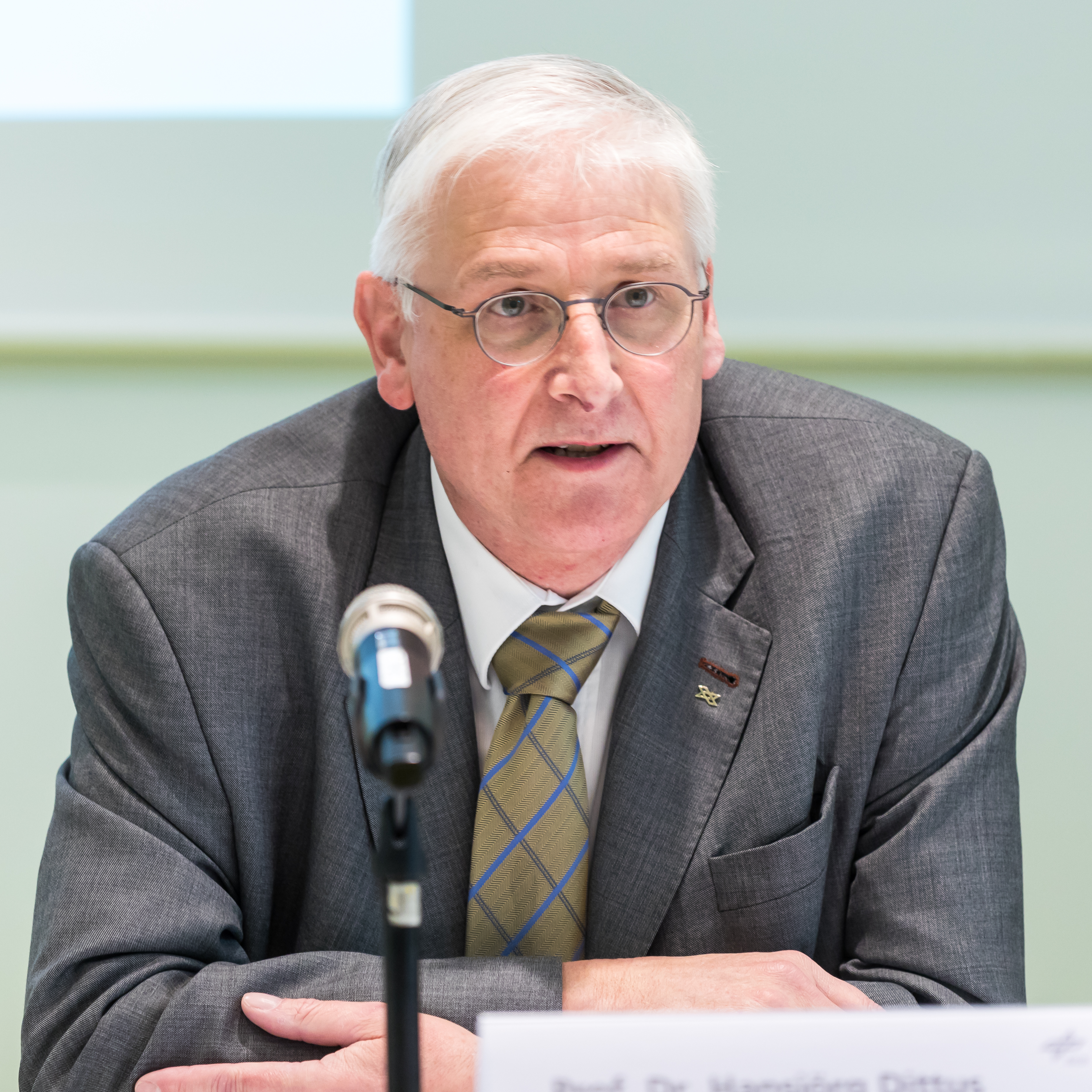
Dittus in 2019

Hansjörg Dittus (born 1957) is a German physicist and professor. He is director of Institute of Space Systems of German Aerospace Center. Dittus is executive board member for Space Research and Technology.

His fields of expertise are gravitational physics, metrology, inertial sensors. He is involved in many space-based experiments aimed at testing foundational issues of gravitational interaction. He collaborates with the Center of Applied Space Technology and Microgravity (ZARM) at the University of Bremen.

== Awards and honors ==
Asteroid 310652 Hansjörgdittus, discovered by astronomers with the Asiago-DLR Asteroid Survey at Cima Ekar in 2002, was named in his honor. The official naming citation was published by the Working Group for Small Bodies Nomenclature of the IAU on 8 November 2021.
