= Gottliebin Dittus =

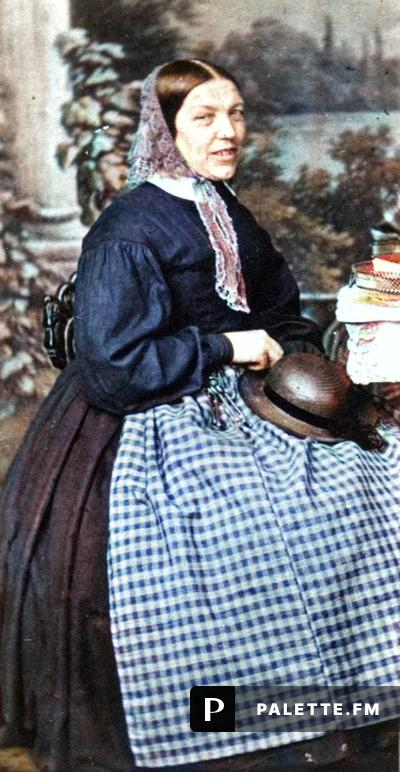
- Gottliebin Dittus
- Born: 1815
- Died: 1872 (aged 56–57)

Gottliebin Dittus (1815 – 1872) was a German woman who was allegedly possessed by demons and exorcised over a period of years by Johann Blumhardt. These events solidified the standing of Blumhardt as a divine and minister and became a notable event in German Lutheranism.

== Early life ==
Dittus was a parishioner at Möttlingen in present-day Baden-Württemberg province of Germany.

== Possession and exorcism ==
Dittus was a central figure in one of the most famous cases of alleged possession and poltergeist activity in 19th-century Germany, known as the Möttlingen Poltergeist or Spiritual Disturbances at Möttlingen. She was not a public figure in the conventional sense but became historically notable due to this paranormal case, which was documented by Christian Friedrich Blumhardt, a Lutheran pastor who was the son of the exorcist.

In the late 1830s and early 1840s, Dittus reportedly began experiencing strange phenomena, including:

- Trances and seizures
- Speaking in voices not her own
- Supernatural manifestations in her home (noises, moving objects, etc.)

The situation drew the attention of Johann Christoph Blumhardt, who was a young pastor in Möttingen at the time. He believed Dittus was possessed by evil spirits and began a long and dramatic process of prayer and exorcism.

After several months, Dittus was said to have been freed from the spirits. The climactic moment came when a voice allegedly cried out from her: "Jesus is Victor!" — a phrase that became famous and was adopted by Blumhardt as a motto of his ministry.

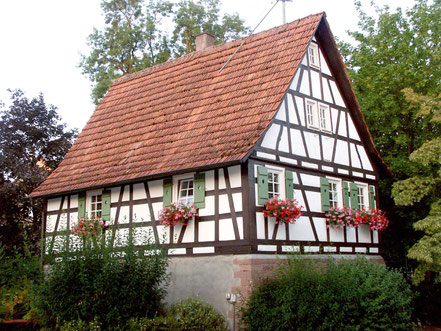
Gottliebin Dittus Haus (Blumhardt Museum)

== Legacy ==
The case profoundly influenced Blumhardt’s theology and ministry, leading to a healing and revival movement.

== Personal life ==
Gottliebin Dittus continued to live in Möttlingen, married and had a number of children.

Dittus died on 26 January 1872.
