= (310071) 2010 KR59 =

Trans-Neptunian object

(310071) 2010 KR_{59}
Discovery
- Discovered by: WISE
- Discovery site: space-based
- Discovery date: 18 May 2010

Designations
- Minor planet category: TNO

Orbital characteristics
- Epoch 16 February 2017 (JD 2457800.5)
- Uncertainty parameter 2
- Observation arc: 10.35 yr (3,782 days)
- Aphelion: 47.545 AU
- Perihelion: 13.013 AU
- Semi-major axis: 30.279 AU
- Eccentricity: 0.5702
- Orbital period (sidereal): 166.62 yr (60,858 days)
- Mean anomaly: 14.936°
- Mean motion: 0° 0^{m} 21.24^{s} / day
- Inclination: 19.638°
- Longitude of ascending node: 46.808°
- Argument of perihelion: 108.73°

Physical characteristics
- Dimensions: 97.26; 110.060±30.820 km
- Synodic rotation period: 8.9879 h
- Geometric albedo: 0.121±0.037
- Absolute magnitude (H): 7.8

(310071) 2010 KR_{59} is a trans-Neptunian object, approximately 110 kilometers in diameter. The object is trapped in a 1:1 mean motion resonance with Neptune, and rotates nearly every 9 hours around its axis. It was discovered on May 18, 2010 at 7:45 UT by the WISE spacecraft. The WISE telescope scanned the entire sky in infrared light from January 2010 to February 2011.

This object follows a very eccentric orbit (eccentricity of 0.57) with a semi-major axis of 29.97 AU and an inclination of 19.76º. Its aphelion goes into the trans-Neptunian belt but its perihelion is relatively close to Saturn's orbit. 2010 KR_{59} follows a complicated and short-lived horseshoe orbit around Neptune. Classical horseshoe orbits include the Lagrangian points L_{3}, L_{4} and L_{5}, this object horseshoe path goes from the L_{4} point towards Neptune reaching the L_{5} point and back. It will become a quasi-satellite of Neptune in about 5,000 years.

2010 KR_{59} is a rather large minor body with an absolute magnitude of 7.7 that translates into a diameter close to 100 kilometers. The discovering WISE/NEOWISE mission estimates a diameter of 110.060 kilometers with a large error margin of 30.820 km.
