= Wolf Dittus =

Wolfgang Peter Johann Dittus (born 1 June 1943) is a primatologist and behavioral ecologist based in Sri Lanka.

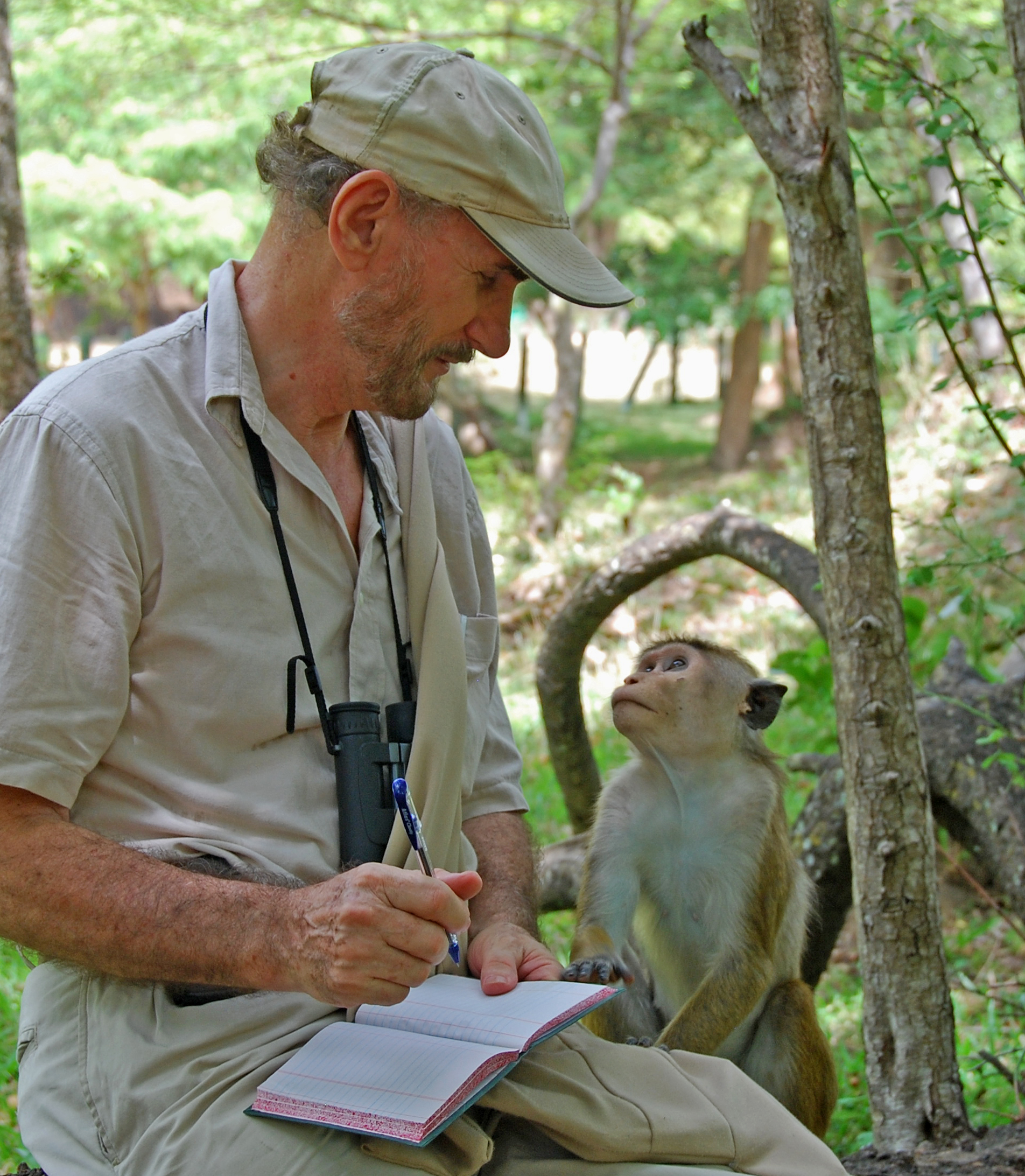
Wolf Dittus with a toque monkey, "Macaca sinica"

== Early life ==
Born in Berlin, Germany, and brought up in the rural Black Forest (German: Schwarzwald) region Baden-Württemberg, Wolfgang 'Wolf' Dittus migrated to Canada in 1953, where he studied geology at McGill University. During this time, however, his interests shifted to psychology and zoology, his early research having been on the song patterns of cardinal birds, inspiring an interest in animal communication in general.

== Career ==
He was awarded a PhD by the University of Maryland in 1974, his doctoral dissertation having been on 'The ecology and behavior of the toque monkey, Macaca sinica', in pursuit of which he moved to Sri Lanka in 1968. This work was conducted largely at a research site established at Polonnaruwa under one of the Smithsonian Institution's projects that commenced in Sri Lanka during the 1960s funded by the United States' Public Law (PL) 480 'Food for Peace' programme. With the phasing out of the Smithsonian's association with this program in 1972, all but Dittus' study on toque macaques came to an end. His PhD research contributed original and seminal discoveries in the fields of behavioral-ecology, population biology and social evolution of primates.

The Sri Lanka primate project still continues, now more than four decades later. It is recognized as being the most intensive long-term study of a wild population of primates, anywhere, ever. Dittus' team tracks (among dozens of other variables) the life histories of some 4,500 macaques from birth to death, maintains matrilineal and patrilineal genealogies, documents migration between troupes and monitors the social rank and relations of each individual through time. His team has been engaged in similar long-term studies on the grey langur (Semnopithecus priam thersites) and the northern purple-faced leaf monkey (Semnopithecus vetulus philbricki) at the same site.

The initiative contributes to the disciplines of sociobiology, forest ecology, population biology, genetics, epidemiology and conservation in these primates. It has up to now generated more than 50 scientific papers[; See Publications below] and is remarkable for its engagement with the local community as well as a large number of students and volunteers―national and international, specialist and lay―over its lifetime. The research has yielded deep insights into the ecology and evolutionary biology not only of primates, but also of social mammals in general. On the premise that public education is basic to nature conservation, Dittus has contributed to many documentary films in international television about the fascinating phenomenon of primate societies.

== Personal life ==
Wolf Dittus, has two children Thomas and Tatiana, and continues to live and work in Sri Lanka.

== Publications and co-publications ==
1. Dittus, W. P. J. and Lemon, R. E. 1969. Effects of song tutoring and acoustic isolation on song repertoires of cardinals. Animal Behaviour 17, 523-533.

2. Dittus, W. P. J., 1974. The ecology and behavior of the toque monkey, Macaca sinica. Ph.D. Thesis, University of Maryland, Maryland; 55+127+56 pp.

3. Ekanayake, D.K., Welch, R.K., Kieft, R., Hajduk, S. & Dittus, W.P.J. 2007 . Transmission dynamics of Cryprosporidium infection in a natural population of non-human primates at Polonnaruwa. American Journal Tropical Medicine and Hygiene 77(5), 818-822.

4. Dittus, W.P.J. 2004. Demography: a window to social evolution; pp 87–116 in (Thierry, B., Singh, M. & Kaumanns, W., eds.): Macaque societies: A model for the study of social organization, Cambridge University Press, Cambridge.

5. De Silva, A.M., Dittus, W.P.J., Amerasinghe, P.H., et al. 1999. Serologic evidence for an epizootic dengue virus infecting toque macaques (Macaca sinica) at Polonnaruwa, Sri Lanka. American Journal of Tropical Medicine and Hygiene 60(2), 300-306. 6. Dittus, W.P.J. 1998. Birth sex ratios in toque macaques and other mammals: integrating the effects of maternal condition and competition. Behavioral Ecology and Sociobiology, 44: 149-160 .

7. Keane, B., Dittus, W.P.J. and Melnick, D.J. 1997.Paternity assessment in wild groups of toque macaques (Macaca sinica) at Polonnaruwa, Sri Lanka using molecular markers. Molecular Ecology 6(3): 267-282.

8. Hoelzer, G. A., Dittus, W. P. J., Ashley, M. V. et al. 1994. The local distribution of highly divergent mitochondrial-DNA haplotypes in toque macaques (Macaca sinica) at Polonnaruwa, Sri Lanka. Molecular Ecology 3(5), 451-458.

9. Cheverud, J.M., Wilson, P. and Dittus, W.P.J. 1992. Primate population studies at Polonnaruwa. 3. Somatometric growth in a natural population of toque macaques (Macaca sinica). Journal of Human Evolution 23(1), 51-77.

10. Cheverud, J.M. and Dittus, W.P.J. 1992. Primate population studies at Polonnaruwa. 2. Heritability of body measurements in a natural-population of toque macaques (Macaca sinica). American Journal of Primatology 27(2), 145-156.

11. Dittus, W. P. J. 1987. Group fusion among wild toque-macaques - an extreme case of intergroup resource competition. Behaviour 100, 247-291.

12. Dittus, W.P.J. 1986. Sex-differences in fitness following a group take-over among toque macaques - testing models of social evolution. Behavioral Ecology and Sociobiology 19(4): 257-.

13. Dittus, W.P.J. 1985. The influence of cyclones on the dry evergreen forest of Sri Lanka. Biotropica 7(1), 1-14.

14. Dittus, W.P.J. 1984. Toque macaque food calls - semantic communication concerning food distribution in the environment. Animal Behaviour 32, 470-477.

15. Dittus W.P.J. 1980. The social regulation of primate populations: a synthesis; in Lindburg D.G. (ed.), The macaques: studies in ecology, behavior and evolution. Van Nostrand Reinhold, New York, pp 263–286.

16. Dittus, W.P.J. 1979. Evolution of behaviors: regulating density and age-specific sex ratios in a primate population. Behaviour 69, 265-302.

17. Dittus, W.P.J. 1977. The social regulation of population density and age-sex distribution in toque monkey. Behaviour 63(2), 281-322.
