= Meanings of minor-planet names: 311001–312000 =

As minor planet discoveries are confirmed, they are given a permanent number by the IAU's Minor Planet Center (MPC), and the discoverers can then submit names for them, following the IAU's naming conventions. The list below concerns those minor planets in the specified number-range that have received names, and explains the meanings of those names.

Official naming citations of newly named small Solar System bodies are approved and published in a bulletin by IAU's Working Group for Small Bodies Nomenclature (WGSBN). Before May 2021, citations were published in MPC's Minor Planet Circulars for many decades. Recent citations can also be found on the JPL Small-Body Database (SBDB). Until his death in 2016, German astronomer Lutz D. Schmadel compiled these citations into the Dictionary of Minor Planet Names (DMP) and regularly updated the collection.

Based on Paul Herget's The Names of the Minor Planets, Schmadel also researched the unclear origin of numerous asteroids, most of which had been named prior to World War II. This article incorporates text from this source, which is in the public domain: SBDB New namings may only be added to this list below after official publication as the preannouncement of names is condemned. The WGSBN publishes a comprehensive guideline for the naming rules of non-cometary small Solar System bodies.

== 311001–311100 ==
Named minor planet	Provisional	This minor planet was named for...	Ref · Catalog
There are no named minor planets in this number range

== 311101–311200 ==
back to top

Named minor planet	Provisional	This minor planet was named for...	Ref · Catalog
311119 Pacner	2004 PA_{20}	Karel Pacner (1936–2021) was a Czech science journalist and writer interested in cosmonautics. He attended the 1969 launch of Apollo 11 as the only Czech journalist. Pacner correctly described events and people from both the Soviet and American sides of the space race, as well as later cooperation in space.	IAU · 311119

== 311201–311300 ==
back to top

Named minor planet	Provisional	This minor planet was named for...	Ref · Catalog
311231 Anuradhapura	2005 BC_{23}	Anuradhapura is a UNESCO World Heritage Site, situated in north-central Sri Lanka and was the capital city of the island for over a millennium.	JPL · 311231

== 311301–311400 ==
back to top

Named minor planet	Provisional	This minor planet was named for...	Ref · Catalog
There are no named minor planets in this number range

== 311401–311500 ==
back to top

Named minor planet	Provisional	This minor planet was named for...	Ref · Catalog
There are no named minor planets in this number range

== 311501–311600 ==
back to top

Named minor planet	Provisional	This minor planet was named for...	Ref · Catalog
There are no named minor planets in this number range

== 311601–311700 ==
back to top

Named minor planet	Provisional	This minor planet was named for...	Ref · Catalog
311604 Axelmurk	2006 KD_{137}	Axel Murk, German scientist.	IAU · 311604

== 311701–311800 ==
back to top

Named minor planet	Provisional	This minor planet was named for...	Ref · Catalog
311785 Erwanmazarico	2006 UB_{62}	Erwan M. Mazarico (born 1982), a planetary scientist.	JPL · 311785
311786 Mykolaleontovych	2006 UW_{62}	Mykola Dmytrovych Leontovych, Ukrainian composer, choral conductor, pianist, and collector of musical folklore.	IAU · 311786

== 311801–311900 ==
back to top

Named minor planet	Provisional	This minor planet was named for...	Ref · Catalog
There are no named minor planets in this number range

== 311901–312000 ==
back to top

Named minor planet	Provisional	This minor planet was named for...	Ref · Catalog
311957 Barryalbright	2007 DQ_{42}	Barry Albright (born 1957) is an American paleontologist and professor. Albright specializes in paleomagnetism and has done extensive work on the paleomagnetic stratigraphy of Cretaceous strata in southern Utah. He has also described new plesiosaur genera from the Western Interior Seaway.	JPL · 311957

back to top

Preceded by 310,001–311,000	Meanings of minor-planet names List of minor planets: 311,001–312,000	Succeeded by 312,001–313,000
