= List of minor planets: 311001–312000 =

The following is a partial list of minor planets, running from minor-planet number 311001 through 312000, inclusive. The primary data for this and other partial lists is based on JPL's "Small-Body Orbital Elements" and data available from the Minor Planet Center. Critical list information is also provided by the MPC, unless otherwise specified from Lowell Observatory. A detailed description of the table's columns and additional sources are given on the main page including a complete list of every page in this series, and a statistical break-up on the dynamical classification of minor planets.

Also see the summary list of all named bodies in numerical and alphabetical order, and the corresponding naming citations for the number range of this particular list. New namings may only be added to this list after official publication, as the preannouncement of names is condemned by the Working Group for Small Bodies Nomenclature of the International Astronomical Union.

Near-Earth obj.	MBA (inner)	MBA (outer)	Centaur
Mars-crosser	MBA (middle)	Jupiter trojan	Trans-Neptunian obj.
Unclassified

== 311001–311100 ==
Designation			Discovery			Properties		Ref
Permanent	Provisional	Named after	Date	Site	Discoverer(s)	Category	Diam.	Ref
311001	2003 WX_{192}	—	November 21, 2003	Socorro	LINEAR	·	1.3 km	MPC · JPL
311002	2003 WC_{193}	—	November 24, 2003	Socorro	LINEAR	·	2.1 km	MPC · JPL
311003	2003 XL_{41}	—	December 14, 2003	Palomar	NEAT	·	2.0 km	MPC · JPL
311004	2003 YB_{2}	—	December 17, 2003	Socorro	LINEAR	PHO	1.8 km	MPC · JPL
311005	2003 YF_{2}	—	December 17, 2003	Socorro	LINEAR	H	730 m	MPC · JPL
311006	2003 YV_{12}	—	December 17, 2003	Palomar	NEAT	EUN	2.0 km	MPC · JPL
311007	2003 YF_{16}	—	December 17, 2003	Anderson Mesa	LONEOS	H	840 m	MPC · JPL
311008	2003 YK_{17}	—	December 17, 2003	Kitt Peak	Spacewatch	·	1.8 km	MPC · JPL
311009	2003 YO_{20}	—	December 17, 2003	Kitt Peak	Spacewatch	·	2.1 km	MPC · JPL
311010	2003 YP_{64}	—	December 19, 2003	Kitt Peak	Spacewatch	3:2	9.6 km	MPC · JPL
311011	2003 YJ_{65}	—	December 19, 2003	Socorro	LINEAR	·	1.5 km	MPC · JPL
311012	2003 YD_{76}	—	December 18, 2003	Socorro	LINEAR	·	1.8 km	MPC · JPL
311013	2003 YM_{82}	—	December 18, 2003	Socorro	LINEAR	·	1.4 km	MPC · JPL
311014	2003 YX_{124}	—	December 29, 2003	Socorro	LINEAR	H	700 m	MPC · JPL
311015	2003 YZ_{127}	—	December 27, 2003	Socorro	LINEAR	·	1.6 km	MPC · JPL
311016	2003 YZ_{134}	—	December 28, 2003	Socorro	LINEAR	JUN	1.3 km	MPC · JPL
311017	2003 YV_{147}	—	December 29, 2003	Socorro	LINEAR	·	1.7 km	MPC · JPL
311018	2003 YB_{156}	—	December 30, 2003	Socorro	LINEAR	HNS	1.8 km	MPC · JPL
311019	2003 YW_{162}	—	December 17, 2003	Socorro	LINEAR	·	1.6 km	MPC · JPL
311020	2003 YU_{172}	—	December 18, 2003	Kitt Peak	Spacewatch	·	1.2 km	MPC · JPL
311021	2004 AT_{4}	—	January 12, 2004	Palomar	NEAT	EUN	1.7 km	MPC · JPL
311022	2004 AG_{7}	—	January 14, 2004	Palomar	NEAT	H	650 m	MPC · JPL
311023	2004 BU_{10}	—	January 17, 2004	Haleakala	NEAT	·	1.5 km	MPC · JPL
311024	2004 BA_{20}	—	January 18, 2004	Palomar	NEAT	·	1.4 km	MPC · JPL
311025	2004 BG_{20}	—	January 16, 2004	Palomar	NEAT	·	1.2 km	MPC · JPL
311026	2004 BV_{20}	—	January 16, 2004	Kitt Peak	Spacewatch	·	2.4 km	MPC · JPL
311027	2004 BE_{25}	—	January 19, 2004	Catalina	CSS	·	1.4 km	MPC · JPL
311028	2004 BW_{28}	—	January 18, 2004	Palomar	NEAT	·	1.4 km	MPC · JPL
311029	2004 BN_{29}	—	January 18, 2004	Palomar	NEAT	·	1.7 km	MPC · JPL
311030	2004 BG_{34}	—	January 19, 2004	Kitt Peak	Spacewatch	·	1.3 km	MPC · JPL
311031	2004 BM_{35}	—	January 19, 2004	Kitt Peak	Spacewatch	·	1.4 km	MPC · JPL
311032	2004 BH_{38}	—	January 19, 2004	Catalina	CSS	(5)	1.5 km	MPC · JPL
311033	2004 BL_{44}	—	January 22, 2004	Socorro	LINEAR	·	2.0 km	MPC · JPL
311034	2004 BY_{47}	—	January 21, 2004	Socorro	LINEAR	·	1.5 km	MPC · JPL
311035	2004 BN_{49}	—	December 18, 2003	Kitt Peak	Spacewatch	·	1.5 km	MPC · JPL
311036	2004 BJ_{50}	—	January 21, 2004	Socorro	LINEAR	MAR	1.3 km	MPC · JPL
311037	2004 BR_{55}	—	January 22, 2004	Socorro	LINEAR	·	1.3 km	MPC · JPL
311038	2004 BO_{56}	—	January 23, 2004	Anderson Mesa	LONEOS	H	850 m	MPC · JPL
311039	2004 BL_{59}	—	January 24, 2004	Socorro	LINEAR	·	1.1 km	MPC · JPL
311040	2004 BW_{67}	—	January 23, 2004	Socorro	LINEAR	H	650 m	MPC · JPL
311041	2004 BV_{70}	—	January 22, 2004	Socorro	LINEAR	·	1.5 km	MPC · JPL
311042	2004 BX_{74}	—	January 26, 2004	Anderson Mesa	LONEOS	(5)	1.7 km	MPC · JPL
311043	2004 BA_{100}	—	January 28, 2004	Catalina	CSS	·	1.9 km	MPC · JPL
311044	2004 BB_{103}	—	January 31, 2004	Socorro	LINEAR	APO +1km · PHA	1.3 km	MPC · JPL
311045	2004 BN_{108}	—	January 28, 2004	Catalina	CSS	(5)	1.8 km	MPC · JPL
311046	2004 BF_{114}	—	January 29, 2004	Socorro	LINEAR	H	700 m	MPC · JPL
311047	2004 BL_{129}	—	January 16, 2004	Kitt Peak	Spacewatch	·	760 m	MPC · JPL
311048	2004 BW_{138}	—	January 19, 2004	Kitt Peak	Spacewatch	·	910 m	MPC · JPL
311049	2004 BU_{141}	—	January 19, 2004	Kitt Peak	Spacewatch	·	960 m	MPC · JPL
311050	2004 BO_{143}	—	January 19, 2004	Kitt Peak	Spacewatch	(5)	1.3 km	MPC · JPL
311051	2004 BU_{146}	—	January 22, 2004	Socorro	LINEAR	·	1.4 km	MPC · JPL
311052	2004 BW_{148}	—	January 16, 2004	Kitt Peak	Spacewatch	·	1.1 km	MPC · JPL
311053	2004 BD_{154}	—	January 28, 2004	Kitt Peak	Spacewatch	·	1.2 km	MPC · JPL
311054	2004 CX_{3}	—	February 10, 2004	Palomar	NEAT	·	1.3 km	MPC · JPL
311055	2004 CG_{9}	—	February 11, 2004	Palomar	NEAT	·	1.4 km	MPC · JPL
311056	2004 CX_{20}	—	February 11, 2004	Kitt Peak	Spacewatch	·	1.1 km	MPC · JPL
311057	2004 CY_{42}	—	February 11, 2004	Palomar	NEAT	·	1.3 km	MPC · JPL
311058	2004 CK_{57}	—	February 11, 2004	Socorro	LINEAR	·	1.6 km	MPC · JPL
311059	2004 CJ_{59}	—	February 10, 2004	Palomar	NEAT	·	1.4 km	MPC · JPL
311060	2004 CN_{60}	—	February 11, 2004	Palomar	NEAT	·	1.7 km	MPC · JPL
311061	2004 CO_{65}	—	February 14, 2004	Haleakala	NEAT	·	1.9 km	MPC · JPL
311062	2004 CJ_{66}	—	February 15, 2004	Socorro	LINEAR	·	1.2 km	MPC · JPL
311063	2004 CK_{67}	—	February 10, 2004	Palomar	NEAT	(5)	1.5 km	MPC · JPL
311064	2004 CQ_{69}	—	February 11, 2004	Palomar	NEAT	(5)	1.8 km	MPC · JPL
311065	2004 CF_{84}	—	February 12, 2004	Palomar	NEAT	·	1.4 km	MPC · JPL
311066	2004 DC	—	February 16, 2004	Socorro	LINEAR	APO +1km · PHA · moon	780 m	MPC · JPL
311067	2004 DV	—	February 16, 2004	Kitt Peak	Spacewatch	·	1.5 km	MPC · JPL
311068	2004 DD_{3}	—	February 16, 2004	Kitt Peak	Spacewatch	·	3.6 km	MPC · JPL
311069	2004 DW_{7}	—	February 17, 2004	Kitt Peak	Spacewatch	(5)	1.2 km	MPC · JPL
311070	2004 DU_{19}	—	February 17, 2004	Socorro	LINEAR	·	1.3 km	MPC · JPL
311071	2004 DV_{20}	—	February 17, 2004	Socorro	LINEAR	·	1.7 km	MPC · JPL
311072	2004 DN_{61}	—	February 26, 2004	Socorro	LINEAR	3:2 · SHU	9.4 km	MPC · JPL
311073	2004 DM_{76}	—	February 18, 2004	Socorro	LINEAR	·	1.8 km	MPC · JPL
311074	2004 EW_{3}	—	March 10, 2004	Palomar	NEAT	·	3.9 km	MPC · JPL
311075	2004 EB_{5}	—	March 11, 2004	Palomar	NEAT	(5)	1.5 km	MPC · JPL
311076	2004 EY_{10}	—	March 15, 2004	Desert Eagle	W. K. Y. Yeung	·	1.5 km	MPC · JPL
311077	2004 EH_{18}	—	March 12, 2004	Palomar	NEAT	JUN	1.6 km	MPC · JPL
311078	2004 EN_{28}	—	March 15, 2004	Kitt Peak	Spacewatch	·	1.5 km	MPC · JPL
311079	2004 EZ_{32}	—	March 15, 2004	Kitt Peak	Spacewatch	·	2.4 km	MPC · JPL
311080	2004 EW_{48}	—	March 15, 2004	Catalina	CSS	·	1.6 km	MPC · JPL
311081	2004 EX_{52}	—	March 15, 2004	Socorro	LINEAR	·	1.4 km	MPC · JPL
311082	2004 EL_{72}	—	March 15, 2004	Catalina	CSS	·	1.8 km	MPC · JPL
311083	2004 EM_{74}	—	March 13, 2004	Palomar	NEAT	MIS	3.3 km	MPC · JPL
311084	2004 EM_{88}	—	March 14, 2004	Kitt Peak	Spacewatch	·	2.0 km	MPC · JPL
311085	2004 EL_{93}	—	March 15, 2004	Socorro	LINEAR	·	1.7 km	MPC · JPL
311086	2004 ET_{94}	—	March 15, 2004	Socorro	LINEAR	·	1.9 km	MPC · JPL
311087	2004 EA_{95}	—	March 15, 2004	Socorro	LINEAR	·	2.2 km	MPC · JPL
311088	2004 EX_{112}	—	March 15, 2004	Kitt Peak	Spacewatch	·	2.0 km	MPC · JPL
311089	2004 FJ_{13}	—	March 16, 2004	Catalina	CSS	ADE	2.6 km	MPC · JPL
311090	2004 FC_{15}	—	March 16, 2004	Kitt Peak	Spacewatch	·	2.3 km	MPC · JPL
311091	2004 FL_{26}	—	March 17, 2004	Kitt Peak	Spacewatch	GEF	1.6 km	MPC · JPL
311092	2004 FD_{82}	—	March 17, 2004	Kitt Peak	Spacewatch	BRG	1.7 km	MPC · JPL
311093	2004 FX_{99}	—	March 22, 2004	Socorro	LINEAR	·	2.6 km	MPC · JPL
311094	2004 FY_{126}	—	March 27, 2004	Socorro	LINEAR	·	1.6 km	MPC · JPL
311095	2004 FC_{136}	—	March 27, 2004	Kitt Peak	Spacewatch	(32418)	2.7 km	MPC · JPL
311096	2004 FR_{138}	—	March 17, 2004	Socorro	LINEAR	·	2.4 km	MPC · JPL
311097	2004 FW_{143}	—	March 28, 2004	Socorro	LINEAR	·	2.0 km	MPC · JPL
311098	2004 FL_{145}	—	March 30, 2004	Kitt Peak	Spacewatch	·	1.4 km	MPC · JPL
311099	2004 GT_{5}	—	April 11, 2004	Palomar	NEAT	·	2.8 km	MPC · JPL
311100	2004 GO_{71}	—	April 13, 2004	Palomar	NEAT	·	2.2 km	MPC · JPL

== 311101–311200 ==
back to top

Designation			Discovery			Properties		Ref
Permanent	Provisional	Named after	Date	Site	Discoverer(s)	Category	Diam.	Ref
311101	2004 GU_{74}	—	April 15, 2004	Socorro	LINEAR	·	3.5 km	MPC · JPL
311102	2004 HR_{2}	—	April 16, 2004	Anderson Mesa	LONEOS	·	2.0 km	MPC · JPL
311103	2004 HL_{14}	—	April 16, 2004	Kitt Peak	Spacewatch	·	2.0 km	MPC · JPL
311104	2004 HR_{23}	—	April 16, 2004	Kitt Peak	Spacewatch	526	3.2 km	MPC · JPL
311105	2004 HV_{36}	—	April 19, 2004	Socorro	LINEAR	·	2.9 km	MPC · JPL
311106	2004 HG_{43}	—	April 20, 2004	Kitt Peak	Spacewatch	EUN	1.8 km	MPC · JPL
311107	2004 HM_{52}	—	April 24, 2004	Socorro	LINEAR	·	2.5 km	MPC · JPL
311108	2004 JT	—	May 9, 2004	Socorro	LINEAR	BAR	1.9 km	MPC · JPL
311109	2004 JV_{3}	—	May 9, 2004	Kitt Peak	Spacewatch	·	2.1 km	MPC · JPL
311110	2004 JS_{19}	—	May 13, 2004	Palomar	NEAT	·	4.5 km	MPC · JPL
311111	2004 KK_{12}	—	May 21, 2004	Catalina	CSS	GEF	1.9 km	MPC · JPL
311112	2004 LQ_{8}	—	June 12, 2004	Catalina	CSS	BRA	2.0 km	MPC · JPL
311113	2004 LB_{15}	—	June 11, 2004	Socorro	LINEAR	·	5.0 km	MPC · JPL
311114	2004 LR_{25}	—	June 15, 2004	Socorro	LINEAR	·	3.7 km	MPC · JPL
311115	2004 NN_{7}	—	July 14, 2004	Socorro	LINEAR	·	2.4 km	MPC · JPL
311116	2004 NZ_{23}	—	July 14, 2004	Socorro	LINEAR	·	790 m	MPC · JPL
311117	2004 NV_{25}	—	July 11, 2004	Socorro	LINEAR	TIR	2.0 km	MPC · JPL
311118	2004 OQ	—	July 17, 2004	7300	W. K. Y. Yeung	·	2.5 km	MPC · JPL
311119 Pacner	2004 PA_{20}	Pacner	August 8, 2004	Kleť	KLENOT	HYG	2.9 km	MPC · JPL
311120	2004 PW_{36}	—	August 9, 2004	Socorro	LINEAR	·	3.3 km	MPC · JPL
311121	2004 PC_{47}	—	August 8, 2004	Palomar	NEAT	·	930 m	MPC · JPL
311122	2004 PN_{92}	—	August 12, 2004	Palomar	NEAT	·	4.3 km	MPC · JPL
311123	2004 PQ_{96}	—	August 11, 2004	Campo Imperatore	CINEOS	·	2.8 km	MPC · JPL
311124	2004 PH_{97}	—	August 8, 2004	Socorro	LINEAR	PHO	1.1 km	MPC · JPL
311125	2004 PN_{105}	—	August 13, 2004	Palomar	NEAT	·	4.5 km	MPC · JPL
311126	2004 QJ_{24}	—	August 27, 2004	Socorro	LINEAR	PHO	1.3 km	MPC · JPL
311127	2004 QK_{25}	—	August 26, 2004	Socorro	LINEAR	PHO	4.1 km	MPC · JPL
311128	2004 QZ_{26}	—	August 22, 2004	Kitt Peak	Spacewatch	·	3.8 km	MPC · JPL
311129	2004 RX_{6}	—	September 5, 2004	Palomar	NEAT	(43176)	4.0 km	MPC · JPL
311130	2004 RV_{13}	—	September 6, 2004	Siding Spring	SSS	·	3.8 km	MPC · JPL
311131	2004 RX_{56}	—	September 8, 2004	Socorro	LINEAR	·	800 m	MPC · JPL
311132	2004 RA_{67}	—	September 8, 2004	Socorro	LINEAR	·	910 m	MPC · JPL
311133	2004 RY_{86}	—	September 7, 2004	Palomar	NEAT	·	4.3 km	MPC · JPL
311134	2004 RZ_{86}	—	September 7, 2004	Palomar	NEAT	EOS	2.4 km	MPC · JPL
311135	2004 RJ_{108}	—	September 9, 2004	Kitt Peak	Spacewatch	·	870 m	MPC · JPL
311136	2004 RY_{136}	—	September 8, 2004	Campo Imperatore	CINEOS	·	650 m	MPC · JPL
311137	2004 RK_{138}	—	August 20, 2004	Catalina	CSS	·	3.6 km	MPC · JPL
311138	2004 RU_{144}	—	September 9, 2004	Socorro	LINEAR	·	5.1 km	MPC · JPL
311139	2004 RQ_{155}	—	September 10, 2004	Socorro	LINEAR	·	4.1 km	MPC · JPL
311140	2004 RY_{174}	—	September 10, 2004	Socorro	LINEAR	·	5.5 km	MPC · JPL
311141	2004 RS_{200}	—	September 10, 2004	Socorro	LINEAR	·	990 m	MPC · JPL
311142	2004 RZ_{205}	—	September 10, 2004	Socorro	LINEAR	·	4.6 km	MPC · JPL
311143	2004 RL_{226}	—	September 9, 2004	Socorro	LINEAR	·	1.1 km	MPC · JPL
311144	2004 RJ_{233}	—	September 9, 2004	Kitt Peak	Spacewatch	·	740 m	MPC · JPL
311145	2004 RX_{235}	—	September 10, 2004	Socorro	LINEAR	(883)	1.9 km	MPC · JPL
311146	2004 RZ_{247}	—	September 12, 2004	Socorro	LINEAR	·	5.1 km	MPC · JPL
311147	2004 RP_{248}	—	September 12, 2004	Socorro	LINEAR	·	4.8 km	MPC · JPL
311148	2004 RZ_{308}	—	September 13, 2004	Kitt Peak	Spacewatch	·	4.8 km	MPC · JPL
311149	2004 RK_{316}	—	September 11, 2004	Socorro	LINEAR	·	4.6 km	MPC · JPL
311150	2004 RB_{339}	—	September 11, 2004	Reedy Creek	J. Broughton	·	3.8 km	MPC · JPL
311151	2004 SK_{26}	—	September 21, 2004	Socorro	LINEAR	·	1.6 km	MPC · JPL
311152	2004 SY_{33}	—	September 17, 2004	Socorro	LINEAR	·	1.2 km	MPC · JPL
311153	2004 SM_{37}	—	September 17, 2004	Kitt Peak	Spacewatch	·	3.6 km	MPC · JPL
311154	2004 TF_{3}	—	October 4, 2004	Socorro	LINEAR	·	1.0 km	MPC · JPL
311155	2004 TE_{17}	—	October 12, 2004	Socorro	LINEAR	·	7.2 km	MPC · JPL
311156	2004 TZ_{41}	—	October 4, 2004	Kitt Peak	Spacewatch	·	1.1 km	MPC · JPL
311157	2004 TQ_{44}	—	October 4, 2004	Kitt Peak	Spacewatch	·	750 m	MPC · JPL
311158	2004 TT_{55}	—	October 4, 2004	Kitt Peak	Spacewatch	·	680 m	MPC · JPL
311159	2004 TZ_{62}	—	October 5, 2004	Kitt Peak	Spacewatch	·	980 m	MPC · JPL
311160	2004 TG_{78}	—	October 4, 2004	Socorro	LINEAR	·	6.4 km	MPC · JPL
311161	2004 TZ_{87}	—	October 5, 2004	Kitt Peak	Spacewatch	·	4.1 km	MPC · JPL
311162	2004 TR_{113}	—	October 7, 2004	Palomar	NEAT	·	810 m	MPC · JPL
311163	2004 TL_{138}	—	October 9, 2004	Anderson Mesa	LONEOS	VER	4.2 km	MPC · JPL
311164	2004 TG_{143}	—	October 4, 2004	Kitt Peak	Spacewatch	·	890 m	MPC · JPL
311165	2004 TO_{151}	—	October 6, 2004	Kitt Peak	Spacewatch	·	580 m	MPC · JPL
311166	2004 TX_{181}	—	October 7, 2004	Kitt Peak	Spacewatch	·	660 m	MPC · JPL
311167	2004 TV_{219}	—	October 5, 2004	Kitt Peak	Spacewatch	·	1.1 km	MPC · JPL
311168	2004 TQ_{221}	—	October 7, 2004	Socorro	LINEAR	·	1.0 km	MPC · JPL
311169	2004 TD_{238}	—	October 9, 2004	Socorro	LINEAR	·	730 m	MPC · JPL
311170	2004 TX_{245}	—	October 7, 2004	Socorro	LINEAR	·	1.0 km	MPC · JPL
311171	2004 TW_{248}	—	October 7, 2004	Kitt Peak	Spacewatch	·	640 m	MPC · JPL
311172	2004 TC_{260}	—	October 9, 2004	Socorro	LINEAR	·	1.2 km	MPC · JPL
311173	2004 TE_{295}	—	October 10, 2004	Kitt Peak	Spacewatch	CYB	4.3 km	MPC · JPL
311174	2004 TT_{306}	—	October 10, 2004	Socorro	LINEAR	·	4.6 km	MPC · JPL
311175	2004 TT_{340}	—	October 13, 2004	Anderson Mesa	LONEOS	·	1.2 km	MPC · JPL
311176	2004 TX_{346}	—	October 15, 2004	Anderson Mesa	LONEOS	·	820 m	MPC · JPL
311177	2004 TL_{347}	—	October 11, 2004	Moletai	K. Černis, Zdanavicius, J.	(2076)	860 m	MPC · JPL
311178	2004 VU_{7}	—	March 31, 2003	Kitt Peak	Spacewatch	·	1.1 km	MPC · JPL
311179	2004 VR_{33}	—	November 3, 2004	Kitt Peak	Spacewatch	·	860 m	MPC · JPL
311180	2004 VP_{43}	—	November 4, 2004	Kitt Peak	Spacewatch	·	870 m	MPC · JPL
311181	2004 VY_{58}	—	November 9, 2004	Catalina	CSS	HYG	4.0 km	MPC · JPL
311182	2004 VA_{63}	—	November 7, 2004	Socorro	LINEAR	·	910 m	MPC · JPL
311183	2004 VQ_{70}	—	November 4, 2004	Catalina	CSS	·	990 m	MPC · JPL
311184	2004 WT	—	November 17, 2004	Siding Spring	SSS	·	850 m	MPC · JPL
311185	2004 XV_{2}	—	December 2, 2004	Catalina	CSS	·	1.0 km	MPC · JPL
311186	2004 XV_{9}	—	December 2, 2004	Catalina	CSS	·	1.0 km	MPC · JPL
311187	2004 XZ_{12}	—	December 8, 2004	Socorro	LINEAR	·	980 m	MPC · JPL
311188	2004 XX_{16}	—	December 3, 2004	Kitt Peak	Spacewatch	·	1.1 km	MPC · JPL
311189	2004 XC_{17}	—	December 3, 2004	Kitt Peak	Spacewatch	·	980 m	MPC · JPL
311190	2004 XO_{22}	—	December 8, 2004	Socorro	LINEAR	·	1.0 km	MPC · JPL
311191	2004 XF_{29}	—	December 10, 2004	Nashville	Clingan, R.	·	1.1 km	MPC · JPL
311192	2004 XG_{35}	—	December 11, 2004	Socorro	LINEAR	V	870 m	MPC · JPL
311193	2004 XD_{45}	—	December 12, 2004	Kitt Peak	Spacewatch	·	940 m	MPC · JPL
311194	2004 XS_{62}	—	December 9, 2004	Vail-Jarnac	Jarnac	·	1.2 km	MPC · JPL
311195	2004 XZ_{62}	—	December 14, 2004	Junk Bond	Junk Bond	·	870 m	MPC · JPL
311196	2004 XO_{76}	—	December 10, 2004	Kitt Peak	Spacewatch	·	1.1 km	MPC · JPL
311197	2004 XS_{77}	—	December 10, 2004	Socorro	LINEAR	·	1.3 km	MPC · JPL
311198	2004 XY_{78}	—	December 10, 2004	Socorro	LINEAR	(2076)	1.1 km	MPC · JPL
311199	2004 XV_{93}	—	December 11, 2004	Kitt Peak	Spacewatch	·	1.1 km	MPC · JPL
311200	2004 XG_{94}	—	December 11, 2004	Kitt Peak	Spacewatch	·	1.1 km	MPC · JPL

== 311201–311300 ==
back to top

Designation			Discovery			Properties		Ref
Permanent	Provisional	Named after	Date	Site	Discoverer(s)	Category	Diam.	Ref
311201	2004 XL_{105}	—	December 11, 2004	Socorro	LINEAR	PHO	2.5 km	MPC · JPL
311202	2004 XF_{109}	—	December 12, 2004	Kitt Peak	Spacewatch	·	880 m	MPC · JPL
311203	2004 XD_{110}	—	December 14, 2004	Socorro	LINEAR	·	1.0 km	MPC · JPL
311204	2004 XO_{116}	—	December 12, 2004	Kitt Peak	Spacewatch	·	970 m	MPC · JPL
311205	2004 XN_{134}	—	December 15, 2004	Socorro	LINEAR	·	1.1 km	MPC · JPL
311206	2004 XR_{144}	—	December 13, 2004	Campo Imperatore	CINEOS	NYS	960 m	MPC · JPL
311207	2004 XY_{161}	—	December 15, 2004	Socorro	LINEAR	·	1.3 km	MPC · JPL
311208	2004 XH_{163}	—	December 15, 2004	Kitt Peak	Spacewatch	(1338) (FLO)	600 m	MPC · JPL
311209	2004 XM_{163}	—	December 15, 2004	Kitt Peak	Spacewatch	·	820 m	MPC · JPL
311210	2004 XO_{165}	—	December 2, 2004	Socorro	LINEAR	·	1.2 km	MPC · JPL
311211	2004 YG_{20}	—	December 18, 2004	Mount Lemmon	Mount Lemmon Survey	·	830 m	MPC · JPL
311212	2004 YT_{23}	—	December 18, 2004	Mount Lemmon	Mount Lemmon Survey	V	750 m	MPC · JPL
311213	2004 YW_{31}	—	December 19, 2004	Kitt Peak	Spacewatch	·	900 m	MPC · JPL
311214	2005 AS_{6}	—	January 6, 2005	Catalina	CSS	·	1.3 km	MPC · JPL
311215	2005 AQ_{18}	—	January 7, 2005	Kitt Peak	Spacewatch	NYS	1.1 km	MPC · JPL
311216	2005 AZ_{20}	—	January 6, 2005	Socorro	LINEAR	·	1.1 km	MPC · JPL
311217	2005 AG_{21}	—	January 6, 2005	Catalina	CSS	·	900 m	MPC · JPL
311218	2005 AD_{23}	—	January 7, 2005	Socorro	LINEAR	·	1.4 km	MPC · JPL
311219	2005 AQ_{23}	—	January 7, 2005	Socorro	LINEAR	·	1.5 km	MPC · JPL
311220	2005 AE_{26}	—	January 11, 2005	Socorro	LINEAR	·	800 m	MPC · JPL
311221	2005 AS_{28}	—	January 15, 2005	Socorro	LINEAR	·	1.9 km	MPC · JPL
311222	2005 AX_{32}	—	January 11, 2005	Socorro	LINEAR	·	830 m	MPC · JPL
311223	2005 AC_{41}	—	January 15, 2005	Socorro	LINEAR	NYS	1.2 km	MPC · JPL
311224	2005 AA_{44}	—	January 15, 2005	Kitt Peak	Spacewatch	·	910 m	MPC · JPL
311225	2005 AQ_{76}	—	January 15, 2005	Kitt Peak	Spacewatch	·	1.4 km	MPC · JPL
311226	2005 AZ_{77}	—	January 15, 2005	Kitt Peak	Spacewatch	·	1.3 km	MPC · JPL
311227	2005 AJ_{80}	—	January 15, 2005	Kitt Peak	Spacewatch	·	1.0 km	MPC · JPL
311228	2005 BG_{1}	—	January 16, 2005	Socorro	LINEAR	PHO	1.3 km	MPC · JPL
311229	2005 BN_{7}	—	January 16, 2005	Socorro	LINEAR	ERI	1.3 km	MPC · JPL
311230	2005 BR_{16}	—	January 16, 2005	Socorro	LINEAR	·	950 m	MPC · JPL
311231 Anuradhapura	2005 BC_{23}	Anuradhapura	January 16, 2005	Kitt Peak	Spacewatch	·	1.2 km	MPC · JPL
311232	2005 BS_{25}	—	January 18, 2005	Catalina	CSS	·	1.2 km	MPC · JPL
311233	2005 CT_{9}	—	February 1, 2005	Kitt Peak	Spacewatch	·	1.5 km	MPC · JPL
311234	2005 CO_{16}	—	February 2, 2005	Socorro	LINEAR	V	1.1 km	MPC · JPL
311235	2005 CO_{17}	—	February 2, 2005	Socorro	LINEAR	·	940 m	MPC · JPL
311236	2005 CN_{20}	—	February 2, 2005	Catalina	CSS	·	1.1 km	MPC · JPL
311237	2005 CG_{23}	—	February 1, 2005	Palomar	NEAT	·	1.5 km	MPC · JPL
311238	2005 CH_{26}	—	February 1, 2005	Palomar	NEAT	·	1.4 km	MPC · JPL
311239	2005 CB_{28}	—	February 3, 2005	Socorro	LINEAR	·	1.6 km	MPC · JPL
311240	2005 CT_{30}	—	February 1, 2005	Kitt Peak	Spacewatch	NYS	1.4 km	MPC · JPL
311241	2005 CD_{57}	—	February 2, 2005	Socorro	LINEAR	·	1.1 km	MPC · JPL
311242	2005 CM_{62}	—	February 9, 2005	Anderson Mesa	LONEOS	·	1.4 km	MPC · JPL
311243	2005 CT_{68}	—	February 3, 2005	Socorro	LINEAR	NYS	860 m	MPC · JPL
311244	2005 EP_{2}	—	March 3, 2005	Vail-Jarnac	Jarnac	·	1.2 km	MPC · JPL
311245	2005 EQ_{10}	—	March 2, 2005	Kitt Peak	Spacewatch	NYS	1.1 km	MPC · JPL
311246	2005 EX_{13}	—	March 3, 2005	Kitt Peak	Spacewatch	NYS	1.1 km	MPC · JPL
311247	2005 EU_{15}	—	March 3, 2005	Kitt Peak	Spacewatch	·	1.0 km	MPC · JPL
311248	2005 EV_{18}	—	March 3, 2005	Kitt Peak	Spacewatch	NYS	1.3 km	MPC · JPL
311249	2005 EO_{20}	—	March 3, 2005	Catalina	CSS	·	1.4 km	MPC · JPL
311250	2005 EV_{20}	—	March 3, 2005	Catalina	CSS	·	1.8 km	MPC · JPL
311251	2005 EU_{21}	—	March 3, 2005	Catalina	CSS	NYS	1.5 km	MPC · JPL
311252	2005 EO_{27}	—	March 3, 2005	Catalina	CSS	V	850 m	MPC · JPL
311253	2005 EY_{28}	—	March 3, 2005	Catalina	CSS	PHO	1.0 km	MPC · JPL
311254	2005 EW_{38}	—	March 8, 2005	Mayhill	Lowe, A.	·	1.5 km	MPC · JPL
311255	2005 EC_{43}	—	March 3, 2005	Kitt Peak	Spacewatch	·	1.5 km	MPC · JPL
311256	2005 EO_{50}	—	March 3, 2005	Catalina	CSS	·	1.4 km	MPC · JPL
311257	2005 EU_{65}	—	March 4, 2005	Mount Lemmon	Mount Lemmon Survey	NYS	1.2 km	MPC · JPL
311258	2005 EW_{68}	—	March 7, 2005	Socorro	LINEAR	·	1.7 km	MPC · JPL
311259	2005 EX_{73}	—	March 3, 2005	Kitt Peak	Spacewatch	NYS	1.0 km	MPC · JPL
311260	2005 EB_{74}	—	March 3, 2005	Kitt Peak	Spacewatch	·	2.3 km	MPC · JPL
311261	2005 EA_{95}	—	March 3, 2005	Catalina	CSS	T_{j} (2.98) · 3:2	8.3 km	MPC · JPL
311262	2005 EE_{95}	—	March 8, 2005	Kitt Peak	Spacewatch	·	1.2 km	MPC · JPL
311263	2005 EK_{100}	—	March 3, 2005	Catalina	CSS	NYS	1.1 km	MPC · JPL
311264	2005 EJ_{112}	—	March 4, 2005	Socorro	LINEAR	·	1.7 km	MPC · JPL
311265	2005 EL_{131}	—	March 9, 2005	Mount Lemmon	Mount Lemmon Survey	NYS	1.0 km	MPC · JPL
311266	2005 EX_{131}	—	March 9, 2005	Catalina	CSS	V	1.1 km	MPC · JPL
311267	2005 ED_{143}	—	March 10, 2005	Catalina	CSS	·	1.5 km	MPC · JPL
311268	2005 EB_{164}	—	March 10, 2005	Mount Lemmon	Mount Lemmon Survey	·	1.3 km	MPC · JPL
311269	2005 ET_{168}	—	March 11, 2005	Mount Lemmon	Mount Lemmon Survey	NYS	1.1 km	MPC · JPL
311270	2005 EU_{189}	—	March 11, 2005	Mount Lemmon	Mount Lemmon Survey	·	1.4 km	MPC · JPL
311271	2005 EZ_{193}	—	March 11, 2005	Mount Lemmon	Mount Lemmon Survey	·	1.1 km	MPC · JPL
311272	2005 EP_{204}	—	March 11, 2005	Mount Lemmon	Mount Lemmon Survey	NYS	1.5 km	MPC · JPL
311273	2005 EN_{225}	—	March 9, 2005	Mount Lemmon	Mount Lemmon Survey	·	1.0 km	MPC · JPL
311274	2005 EK_{235}	—	March 10, 2005	Mount Lemmon	Mount Lemmon Survey	NYS	1.1 km	MPC · JPL
311275	2005 EX_{247}	—	March 12, 2005	Kitt Peak	Spacewatch	·	1.3 km	MPC · JPL
311276	2005 ED_{253}	—	March 10, 2005	Catalina	CSS	PHO	1.3 km	MPC · JPL
311277	2005 EK_{253}	—	March 11, 2005	Mount Lemmon	Mount Lemmon Survey	NYS	870 m	MPC · JPL
311278	2005 EW_{255}	—	March 11, 2005	Mount Lemmon	Mount Lemmon Survey	NYS	1.5 km	MPC · JPL
311279	2005 ED_{259}	—	March 11, 2005	Mount Lemmon	Mount Lemmon Survey	NYS	1.3 km	MPC · JPL
311280	2005 EC_{261}	—	March 12, 2005	Socorro	LINEAR	·	1.5 km	MPC · JPL
311281	2005 EK_{306}	—	March 4, 2005	Mount Lemmon	Mount Lemmon Survey	MAS	710 m	MPC · JPL
311282	2005 EO_{315}	—	March 11, 2005	Kitt Peak	Spacewatch	·	1.3 km	MPC · JPL
311283	2005 EF_{324}	—	March 4, 2005	Socorro	LINEAR	·	1.3 km	MPC · JPL
311284	2005 EY_{327}	—	March 11, 2005	Kitt Peak	Spacewatch	·	1.4 km	MPC · JPL
311285	2005 FE_{1}	—	March 16, 2005	Catalina	CSS	·	1.4 km	MPC · JPL
311286	2005 GX_{10}	—	April 1, 2005	Kitt Peak	Spacewatch	MAS	900 m	MPC · JPL
311287	2005 GQ_{13}	—	April 1, 2005	Anderson Mesa	LONEOS	·	1.8 km	MPC · JPL
311288	2005 GG_{39}	—	April 4, 2005	Mount Lemmon	Mount Lemmon Survey	NYS	1.4 km	MPC · JPL
311289	2005 GO_{42}	—	April 5, 2005	Mount Lemmon	Mount Lemmon Survey	·	970 m	MPC · JPL
311290	2005 GW_{50}	—	April 1, 2005	Kitt Peak	Spacewatch	·	1.9 km	MPC · JPL
311291	2005 GF_{132}	—	April 10, 2005	Kitt Peak	Spacewatch	·	2.4 km	MPC · JPL
311292	2005 GB_{137}	—	April 10, 2005	Kitt Peak	Spacewatch	·	2.3 km	MPC · JPL
311293	2005 GQ_{138}	—	April 12, 2005	Kitt Peak	Spacewatch	NYS	1.5 km	MPC · JPL
311294	2005 GQ_{159}	—	April 12, 2005	Kitt Peak	Spacewatch	·	1.3 km	MPC · JPL
311295	2005 GQ_{173}	—	April 14, 2005	Kitt Peak	Spacewatch	·	1.2 km	MPC · JPL
311296	2005 GW_{208}	—	April 2, 2005	Anderson Mesa	LONEOS	PHO	1 km	MPC · JPL
311297	2005 HD_{7}	—	April 30, 2005	Kitt Peak	Spacewatch	·	1.4 km	MPC · JPL
311298	2005 HH_{9}	—	April 17, 2005	Kitt Peak	Spacewatch	EUN	1.6 km	MPC · JPL
311299	2005 JV_{16}	—	May 4, 2005	Palomar	NEAT	ADE	3.2 km	MPC · JPL
311300	2005 JF_{34}	—	May 4, 2005	Kitt Peak	Spacewatch	·	1.8 km	MPC · JPL

== 311301–311400 ==
back to top

Designation			Discovery			Properties		Ref
Permanent	Provisional	Named after	Date	Site	Discoverer(s)	Category	Diam.	Ref
311301	2005 JA_{35}	—	May 4, 2005	Kitt Peak	Spacewatch	·	1.4 km	MPC · JPL
311302	2005 JD_{44}	—	May 4, 2005	Socorro	LINEAR	JUN	1.5 km	MPC · JPL
311303	2005 JV_{46}	—	May 3, 2005	Kitt Peak	Spacewatch	·	1.2 km	MPC · JPL
311304	2005 JU_{50}	—	May 4, 2005	Kitt Peak	Spacewatch	MAS	990 m	MPC · JPL
311305	2005 JP_{101}	—	May 9, 2005	Mount Lemmon	Mount Lemmon Survey	·	1.5 km	MPC · JPL
311306	2005 JB_{110}	—	May 8, 2005	Kitt Peak	Spacewatch	·	1.5 km	MPC · JPL
311307	2005 JH_{118}	—	May 10, 2005	Kitt Peak	Spacewatch	·	1.9 km	MPC · JPL
311308	2005 JX_{135}	—	May 8, 2005	Kitt Peak	Spacewatch	NYS	1.5 km	MPC · JPL
311309	2005 KY_{3}	—	May 17, 2005	Mount Lemmon	Mount Lemmon Survey	·	1.9 km	MPC · JPL
311310	2005 KJ_{12}	—	May 16, 2005	Siding Spring	SSS	PHO	1.7 km	MPC · JPL
311311	2005 LP	—	June 1, 2005	Mount Lemmon	Mount Lemmon Survey	·	2.3 km	MPC · JPL
311312	2005 LK_{5}	—	June 2, 2005	Catalina	CSS	·	1.8 km	MPC · JPL
311313	2005 LG_{34}	—	June 10, 2005	Kitt Peak	Spacewatch	·	2.2 km	MPC · JPL
311314	2005 MV_{4}	—	June 17, 2005	Mount Lemmon	Mount Lemmon Survey	·	2.6 km	MPC · JPL
311315	2005 MC_{8}	—	June 27, 2005	Kitt Peak	Spacewatch	·	2.1 km	MPC · JPL
311316	2005 MZ_{17}	—	June 27, 2005	Kitt Peak	Spacewatch	·	2.7 km	MPC · JPL
311317	2005 MH_{27}	—	June 29, 2005	Kitt Peak	Spacewatch	·	1.9 km	MPC · JPL
311318	2005 MW_{33}	—	June 29, 2005	Kitt Peak	Spacewatch	·	2.5 km	MPC · JPL
311319	2005 ME_{37}	—	June 30, 2005	Kitt Peak	Spacewatch	·	2.3 km	MPC · JPL
311320	2005 MH_{47}	—	June 29, 2005	Kitt Peak	Spacewatch	·	2.5 km	MPC · JPL
311321	2005 NP_{1}	—	July 3, 2005	Siding Spring	SSS	AMO	580 m	MPC · JPL
311322	2005 NX_{6}	—	July 4, 2005	Kitt Peak	Spacewatch	EUN	1.4 km	MPC · JPL
311323	2005 NA_{11}	—	July 3, 2005	Mount Lemmon	Mount Lemmon Survey	·	2.0 km	MPC · JPL
311324	2005 NU_{22}	—	July 2, 2005	Catalina	CSS	·	2.2 km	MPC · JPL
311325	2005 NO_{23}	—	July 4, 2005	Kitt Peak	Spacewatch	·	2.3 km	MPC · JPL
311326	2005 NE_{29}	—	July 5, 2005	Palomar	NEAT	H	780 m	MPC · JPL
311327	2005 NK_{30}	—	July 4, 2005	Kitt Peak	Spacewatch	MRX	1.4 km	MPC · JPL
311328	2005 NE_{51}	—	July 7, 2005	Kitt Peak	Spacewatch	BRG	1.8 km	MPC · JPL
311329	2005 NG_{69}	—	July 4, 2005	Kitt Peak	Spacewatch	·	2.3 km	MPC · JPL
311330	2005 NM_{69}	—	July 4, 2005	Mount Lemmon	Mount Lemmon Survey	·	1.6 km	MPC · JPL
311331	2005 NZ_{94}	—	July 6, 2005	Anderson Mesa	LONEOS	H	770 m	MPC · JPL
311332	2005 OY	—	July 16, 2005	Reedy Creek	J. Broughton	·	3.0 km	MPC · JPL
311333	2005 OV_{9}	—	July 27, 2005	Palomar	NEAT	·	3.0 km	MPC · JPL
311334	2005 OH_{20}	—	July 28, 2005	Palomar	NEAT	BRA	1.8 km	MPC · JPL
311335	2005 OP_{28}	—	July 31, 2005	Palomar	NEAT	·	3.1 km	MPC · JPL
311336	2005 QX_{24}	—	August 27, 2005	Kitt Peak	Spacewatch	·	2.2 km	MPC · JPL
311337	2005 QY_{43}	—	August 26, 2005	Palomar	NEAT	·	2.3 km	MPC · JPL
311338	2005 QA_{47}	—	August 26, 2005	Palomar	NEAT	·	3.5 km	MPC · JPL
311339	2005 QK_{56}	—	August 28, 2005	Kitt Peak	Spacewatch	·	3.9 km	MPC · JPL
311340	2005 QX_{58}	—	August 25, 2005	Palomar	NEAT	·	1.8 km	MPC · JPL
311341	2005 QY_{61}	—	August 26, 2005	Palomar	NEAT	·	3.5 km	MPC · JPL
311342	2005 QW_{78}	—	August 25, 2005	Palomar	NEAT	·	3.1 km	MPC · JPL
311343	2005 QP_{92}	—	August 26, 2005	Palomar	NEAT	·	1.7 km	MPC · JPL
311344	2005 QB_{122}	—	August 28, 2005	Kitt Peak	Spacewatch	·	2.5 km	MPC · JPL
311345	2005 QU_{128}	—	August 28, 2005	Kitt Peak	Spacewatch	·	2.0 km	MPC · JPL
311346	2005 QJ_{151}	—	August 30, 2005	Kitt Peak	Spacewatch	KOR	1.5 km	MPC · JPL
311347	2005 QJ_{156}	—	August 30, 2005	Palomar	NEAT	·	3.6 km	MPC · JPL
311348	2005 QS_{179}	—	August 26, 2005	Palomar	NEAT	·	2.6 km	MPC · JPL
311349	2005 QO_{182}	—	August 29, 2005	Kitt Peak	Spacewatch	·	2.1 km	MPC · JPL
311350	2005 QR_{190}	—	August 26, 2005	Palomar	NEAT	·	3.1 km	MPC · JPL
311351	2005 QS_{190}	—	August 31, 2005	Palomar	NEAT	·	3.7 km	MPC · JPL
311352	2005 RQ_{21}	—	September 6, 2005	Anderson Mesa	LONEOS	H	700 m	MPC · JPL
311353	2005 RZ_{26}	—	September 10, 2005	Anderson Mesa	LONEOS	EOS	2.9 km	MPC · JPL
311354	2005 RL_{27}	—	September 10, 2005	Anderson Mesa	LONEOS	·	5.1 km	MPC · JPL
311355	2005 RO_{32}	—	September 13, 2005	Sonoita	W. R. Cooney Jr., Gross, J.	·	2.8 km	MPC · JPL
311356	2005 RY_{42}	—	September 13, 2005	Kitt Peak	Spacewatch	·	2.5 km	MPC · JPL
311357	2005 RV_{44}	—	September 2, 2005	Palomar	NEAT	·	5.5 km	MPC · JPL
311358	2005 SU	—	September 22, 2005	Palomar	NEAT	H	760 m	MPC · JPL
311359	2005 SD_{7}	—	September 24, 2005	Kitt Peak	Spacewatch	·	2.7 km	MPC · JPL
311360	2005 SD_{30}	—	September 23, 2005	Kitt Peak	Spacewatch	·	3.2 km	MPC · JPL
311361	2005 SW_{39}	—	September 24, 2005	Kitt Peak	Spacewatch	EOS	2.5 km	MPC · JPL
311362	2005 SX_{46}	—	September 24, 2005	Kitt Peak	Spacewatch	·	3.7 km	MPC · JPL
311363	2005 SA_{74}	—	September 23, 2005	Siding Spring	SSS	·	2.3 km	MPC · JPL
311364	2005 SU_{85}	—	September 24, 2005	Kitt Peak	Spacewatch	EOS	2.4 km	MPC · JPL
311365	2005 SM_{99}	—	September 25, 2005	Kitt Peak	Spacewatch	·	2.1 km	MPC · JPL
311366	2005 SV_{101}	—	September 25, 2005	Kitt Peak	Spacewatch	·	4.6 km	MPC · JPL
311367	2005 SZ_{109}	—	September 26, 2005	Kitt Peak	Spacewatch	·	3.8 km	MPC · JPL
311368	2005 SQ_{141}	—	September 25, 2005	Kitt Peak	Spacewatch	·	2.7 km	MPC · JPL
311369	2005 SF_{147}	—	September 25, 2005	Kitt Peak	Spacewatch	·	2.3 km	MPC · JPL
311370	2005 SL_{148}	—	September 25, 2005	Kitt Peak	Spacewatch	·	2.6 km	MPC · JPL
311371	2005 SX_{158}	—	September 26, 2005	Kitt Peak	Spacewatch	·	3.6 km	MPC · JPL
311372	2005 SZ_{172}	—	September 29, 2005	Kitt Peak	Spacewatch	·	2.5 km	MPC · JPL
311373	2005 SC_{175}	—	September 29, 2005	Kitt Peak	Spacewatch	·	2.9 km	MPC · JPL
311374	2005 SP_{200}	—	September 30, 2005	Kitt Peak	Spacewatch	·	2.3 km	MPC · JPL
311375	2005 SH_{203}	—	September 30, 2005	Anderson Mesa	LONEOS	·	3.4 km	MPC · JPL
311376	2005 SO_{218}	—	September 30, 2005	Palomar	NEAT	·	3.9 km	MPC · JPL
311377	2005 SF_{221}	—	September 29, 2005	Kitt Peak	Spacewatch	·	4.0 km	MPC · JPL
311378	2005 SF_{223}	—	September 28, 2005	Palomar	NEAT	·	2.6 km	MPC · JPL
311379	2005 SR_{232}	—	September 30, 2005	Mount Lemmon	Mount Lemmon Survey	·	3.0 km	MPC · JPL
311380	2005 SP_{245}	—	September 30, 2005	Palomar	NEAT	·	2.6 km	MPC · JPL
311381	2005 SD_{252}	—	September 24, 2005	Palomar	NEAT	EUN	2.1 km	MPC · JPL
311382	2005 SU_{266}	—	September 29, 2005	Anderson Mesa	LONEOS	·	2.5 km	MPC · JPL
311383	2005 SO_{279}	—	September 23, 2005	Kitt Peak	Spacewatch	EOS	2.2 km	MPC · JPL
311384	2005 SK_{285}	—	September 25, 2005	Apache Point	A. C. Becker	·	4.7 km	MPC · JPL
311385	2005 SM_{289}	—	September 24, 2005	Kitt Peak	Spacewatch	·	1.8 km	MPC · JPL
311386	2005 SR_{291}	—	September 25, 2005	Kitt Peak	Spacewatch	·	2.5 km	MPC · JPL
311387	2005 TK_{11}	—	October 1, 2005	Kitt Peak	Spacewatch	·	2.4 km	MPC · JPL
311388	2005 TW_{14}	—	October 3, 2005	Palomar	NEAT	·	4.4 km	MPC · JPL
311389	2005 TB_{26}	—	October 1, 2005	Mount Lemmon	Mount Lemmon Survey	·	2.7 km	MPC · JPL
311390	2005 TA_{30}	—	October 4, 2005	Palomar	NEAT	·	2.7 km	MPC · JPL
311391	2005 TZ_{31}	—	October 1, 2005	Kitt Peak	Spacewatch	THM	2.4 km	MPC · JPL
311392	2005 TW_{41}	—	October 3, 2005	Socorro	LINEAR	·	4.9 km	MPC · JPL
311393	2005 TA_{47}	—	October 3, 2005	Catalina	CSS	EOS	2.4 km	MPC · JPL
311394	2005 TA_{59}	—	October 1, 2005	Mount Lemmon	Mount Lemmon Survey	·	2.8 km	MPC · JPL
311395	2005 TC_{88}	—	October 5, 2005	Catalina	CSS	·	3.5 km	MPC · JPL
311396	2005 TL_{107}	—	October 4, 2005	Mount Lemmon	Mount Lemmon Survey	·	4.0 km	MPC · JPL
311397	2005 TH_{129}	—	October 7, 2005	Kitt Peak	Spacewatch	·	2.4 km	MPC · JPL
311398	2005 TQ_{161}	—	October 9, 2005	Kitt Peak	Spacewatch	·	3.2 km	MPC · JPL
311399	2005 TG_{163}	—	October 9, 2005	Kitt Peak	Spacewatch	·	3.0 km	MPC · JPL
311400	2005 TF_{171}	—	October 10, 2005	Anderson Mesa	LONEOS	·	4.0 km	MPC · JPL

== 311401–311500 ==
back to top

Designation			Discovery			Properties		Ref
Permanent	Provisional	Named after	Date	Site	Discoverer(s)	Category	Diam.	Ref
311401	2005 TE_{189}	—	October 13, 2005	Kitt Peak	Spacewatch	HYG	2.7 km	MPC · JPL
311402	2005 UU_{7}	—	October 26, 2005	Ottmarsheim	C. Rinner	HYG	3.7 km	MPC · JPL
311403	2005 UC_{9}	—	October 21, 2005	Palomar	NEAT	·	3.0 km	MPC · JPL
311404	2005 US_{9}	—	October 21, 2005	Palomar	NEAT	·	3.2 km	MPC · JPL
311405	2005 UD_{12}	—	October 22, 2005	Kitt Peak	Spacewatch	THM	2.9 km	MPC · JPL
311406	2005 UL_{13}	—	October 22, 2005	Kitt Peak	Spacewatch	·	3.4 km	MPC · JPL
311407	2005 UE_{23}	—	October 23, 2005	Kitt Peak	Spacewatch	·	3.1 km	MPC · JPL
311408	2005 UF_{24}	—	October 23, 2005	Kitt Peak	Spacewatch	·	4.3 km	MPC · JPL
311409	2005 UW_{24}	—	October 23, 2005	Kitt Peak	Spacewatch	·	3.2 km	MPC · JPL
311410	2005 UM_{25}	—	October 23, 2005	Kitt Peak	Spacewatch	·	2.4 km	MPC · JPL
311411	2005 UE_{55}	—	October 23, 2005	Catalina	CSS	VER	4.3 km	MPC · JPL
311412	2005 UW_{60}	—	October 25, 2005	Mount Lemmon	Mount Lemmon Survey	·	3.6 km	MPC · JPL
311413	2005 UX_{63}	—	October 25, 2005	Mount Lemmon	Mount Lemmon Survey	·	2.9 km	MPC · JPL
311414	2005 UA_{70}	—	October 23, 2005	Catalina	CSS	EOS	2.4 km	MPC · JPL
311415	2005 UD_{71}	—	October 23, 2005	Catalina	CSS	·	3.2 km	MPC · JPL
311416	2005 UQ_{76}	—	October 24, 2005	Palomar	NEAT	·	4.1 km	MPC · JPL
311417	2005 UQ_{77}	—	October 24, 2005	Palomar	NEAT	·	4.6 km	MPC · JPL
311418	2005 UV_{80}	—	October 25, 2005	Catalina	CSS	·	2.4 km	MPC · JPL
311419	2005 UK_{91}	—	October 28, 1994	Kitt Peak	Spacewatch	·	3.0 km	MPC · JPL
311420	2005 UP_{93}	—	October 22, 2005	Kitt Peak	Spacewatch	HYG	3.1 km	MPC · JPL
311421	2005 UA_{101}	—	October 22, 2005	Kitt Peak	Spacewatch	·	3.4 km	MPC · JPL
311422	2005 US_{107}	—	October 22, 2005	Palomar	NEAT	·	3.1 km	MPC · JPL
311423	2005 UG_{119}	—	October 24, 2005	Kitt Peak	Spacewatch	·	2.8 km	MPC · JPL
311424	2005 UW_{127}	—	October 24, 2005	Kitt Peak	Spacewatch	·	3.6 km	MPC · JPL
311425	2005 UM_{128}	—	October 24, 2005	Kitt Peak	Spacewatch	·	2.1 km	MPC · JPL
311426	2005 UQ_{129}	—	October 24, 2005	Kitt Peak	Spacewatch	·	2.9 km	MPC · JPL
311427	2005 UN_{131}	—	October 24, 2005	Palomar	NEAT	·	5.6 km	MPC · JPL
311428	2005 UU_{134}	—	October 25, 2005	Anderson Mesa	LONEOS	·	2.6 km	MPC · JPL
311429	2005 UT_{166}	—	October 24, 2005	Kitt Peak	Spacewatch	·	2.6 km	MPC · JPL
311430	2005 UJ_{167}	—	October 24, 2005	Kitt Peak	Spacewatch	EOS	2.1 km	MPC · JPL
311431	2005 UR_{175}	—	October 24, 2005	Kitt Peak	Spacewatch	VER	3.3 km	MPC · JPL
311432	2005 US_{175}	—	October 24, 2005	Kitt Peak	Spacewatch	·	3.3 km	MPC · JPL
311433	2005 UV_{175}	—	October 24, 2005	Kitt Peak	Spacewatch	·	3.4 km	MPC · JPL
311434	2005 UX_{198}	—	October 25, 2005	Kitt Peak	Spacewatch	·	2.6 km	MPC · JPL
311435	2005 UJ_{218}	—	October 23, 2005	Catalina	CSS	·	2.8 km	MPC · JPL
311436	2005 UC_{219}	—	October 25, 2005	Kitt Peak	Spacewatch	·	2.6 km	MPC · JPL
311437	2005 UL_{219}	—	October 25, 2005	Kitt Peak	Spacewatch	HYG	3.1 km	MPC · JPL
311438	2005 UN_{228}	—	October 25, 2005	Kitt Peak	Spacewatch	·	3.1 km	MPC · JPL
311439	2005 UA_{229}	—	October 25, 2005	Kitt Peak	Spacewatch	·	3.1 km	MPC · JPL
311440	2005 UE_{230}	—	October 25, 2005	Kitt Peak	Spacewatch	ELF	3.5 km	MPC · JPL
311441	2005 UV_{232}	—	October 25, 2005	Kitt Peak	Spacewatch	·	3.5 km	MPC · JPL
311442	2005 UZ_{233}	—	October 25, 2005	Kitt Peak	Spacewatch	EOS	2.6 km	MPC · JPL
311443	2005 UK_{237}	—	October 25, 2005	Kitt Peak	Spacewatch	·	2.7 km	MPC · JPL
311444	2005 UR_{245}	—	October 26, 2005	Kitt Peak	Spacewatch	·	4.8 km	MPC · JPL
311445	2005 UZ_{255}	—	October 24, 2005	Kitt Peak	Spacewatch	·	3.6 km	MPC · JPL
311446	2005 UV_{261}	—	October 26, 2005	Kitt Peak	Spacewatch	THM	2.4 km	MPC · JPL
311447	2005 UY_{274}	—	October 28, 2005	Mount Lemmon	Mount Lemmon Survey	·	4.4 km	MPC · JPL
311448	2005 UG_{287}	—	October 26, 2005	Kitt Peak	Spacewatch	·	4.4 km	MPC · JPL
311449	2005 UW_{288}	—	October 26, 2005	Kitt Peak	Spacewatch	·	2.5 km	MPC · JPL
311450	2005 UB_{293}	—	October 26, 2005	Kitt Peak	Spacewatch	VER	3.1 km	MPC · JPL
311451	2005 UZ_{317}	—	October 27, 2005	Kitt Peak	Spacewatch	·	3.3 km	MPC · JPL
311452	2005 UG_{325}	—	October 29, 2005	Mount Lemmon	Mount Lemmon Survey	·	2.5 km	MPC · JPL
311453	2005 UJ_{341}	—	October 31, 2005	Mount Lemmon	Mount Lemmon Survey	·	2.6 km	MPC · JPL
311454	2005 UF_{351}	—	October 29, 2005	Catalina	CSS	·	3.2 km	MPC · JPL
311455	2005 UJ_{351}	—	October 29, 2005	Catalina	CSS	(21885)	5.1 km	MPC · JPL
311456	2005 UN_{375}	—	October 27, 2005	Kitt Peak	Spacewatch	·	3.7 km	MPC · JPL
311457	2005 UL_{385}	—	October 28, 2005	Catalina	CSS	EOS	2.4 km	MPC · JPL
311458	2005 UB_{386}	—	October 29, 2005	Mount Lemmon	Mount Lemmon Survey	·	4.4 km	MPC · JPL
311459	2005 UE_{397}	—	October 28, 2005	Mount Lemmon	Mount Lemmon Survey	EOS	2.3 km	MPC · JPL
311460	2005 UA_{416}	—	October 25, 2005	Kitt Peak	Spacewatch	EOS	2.6 km	MPC · JPL
311461	2005 UY_{429}	—	October 28, 2005	Kitt Peak	Spacewatch	(43176)	3.4 km	MPC · JPL
311462	2005 UP_{432}	—	October 28, 2005	Kitt Peak	Spacewatch	·	3.7 km	MPC · JPL
311463	2005 UO_{440}	—	October 29, 2005	Catalina	CSS	EOS	2.5 km	MPC · JPL
311464	2005 UJ_{452}	—	October 28, 2005	Campo Imperatore	CINEOS	·	2.9 km	MPC · JPL
311465	2005 UQ_{455}	—	October 29, 2005	Catalina	CSS	EOS	2.7 km	MPC · JPL
311466	2005 UN_{458}	—	October 30, 2005	Mount Lemmon	Mount Lemmon Survey	EOS	2.6 km	MPC · JPL
311467	2005 UH_{459}	—	October 31, 2005	Kitt Peak	Spacewatch	·	3.6 km	MPC · JPL
311468	2005 UP_{475}	—	October 22, 2005	Palomar	NEAT	T_{j} (2.99) · EUP	6.4 km	MPC · JPL
311469	2005 UQ_{485}	—	October 22, 2005	Catalina	CSS	·	4.1 km	MPC · JPL
311470	2005 UV_{487}	—	October 23, 2005	Catalina	CSS	·	3.8 km	MPC · JPL
311471	2005 UX_{489}	—	October 23, 2005	Catalina	CSS	·	4.7 km	MPC · JPL
311472	2005 UL_{495}	—	October 26, 2005	Socorro	LINEAR	THB	4.3 km	MPC · JPL
311473	2005 UV_{496}	—	October 27, 2005	Palomar	NEAT	·	4.6 km	MPC · JPL
311474	2005 UD_{499}	—	October 27, 2005	Socorro	LINEAR	·	4.1 km	MPC · JPL
311475	2005 UW_{500}	—	October 27, 2005	Catalina	CSS	·	4.1 km	MPC · JPL
311476	2005 UA_{502}	—	October 28, 2005	Catalina	CSS	·	2.9 km	MPC · JPL
311477	2005 UQ_{511}	—	October 28, 2005	Kitt Peak	Spacewatch	·	5.1 km	MPC · JPL
311478	2005 UG_{516}	—	October 29, 2005	Mount Lemmon	Mount Lemmon Survey	·	3.1 km	MPC · JPL
311479	2005 UJ_{516}	—	October 29, 2005	Mount Lemmon	Mount Lemmon Survey	·	3.2 km	MPC · JPL
311480	2005 VQ_{15}	—	November 1, 2005	Catalina	CSS	·	3.9 km	MPC · JPL
311481	2005 VS_{30}	—	November 4, 2005	Kitt Peak	Spacewatch	·	2.8 km	MPC · JPL
311482	2005 VJ_{33}	—	October 23, 2005	Palomar	NEAT	·	3.5 km	MPC · JPL
311483	2005 VR_{47}	—	November 5, 2005	Kitt Peak	Spacewatch	·	2.7 km	MPC · JPL
311484	2005 VM_{49}	—	November 2, 2005	Socorro	LINEAR	·	3.2 km	MPC · JPL
311485	2005 VB_{53}	—	November 3, 2005	Socorro	LINEAR	·	5.1 km	MPC · JPL
311486	2005 VZ_{55}	—	November 4, 2005	Catalina	CSS	·	3.2 km	MPC · JPL
311487	2005 VU_{97}	—	November 5, 2005	Kitt Peak	Spacewatch	HYG	2.8 km	MPC · JPL
311488	2005 VE_{107}	—	November 5, 2005	Kitt Peak	Spacewatch	·	4.6 km	MPC · JPL
311489	2005 VY_{110}	—	November 6, 2005	Mount Lemmon	Mount Lemmon Survey	·	2.5 km	MPC · JPL
311490	2005 VZ_{117}	—	November 12, 2005	Socorro	LINEAR	·	5.7 km	MPC · JPL
311491	2005 VT_{120}	—	November 4, 2005	Catalina	CSS	H	790 m	MPC · JPL
311492	2005 WD_{4}	—	November 18, 2005	Palomar	NEAT	·	6.2 km	MPC · JPL
311493	2005 WP_{10}	—	November 22, 2005	Kitt Peak	Spacewatch	THM	2.2 km	MPC · JPL
311494	2005 WR_{26}	—	November 21, 2005	Kitt Peak	Spacewatch	EUP	4.2 km	MPC · JPL
311495	2005 WQ_{27}	—	November 21, 2005	Kitt Peak	Spacewatch	fast	2.6 km	MPC · JPL
311496	2005 WQ_{42}	—	November 21, 2005	Kitt Peak	Spacewatch	LUT	4.3 km	MPC · JPL
311497	2005 WB_{47}	—	November 25, 2005	Kitt Peak	Spacewatch	·	3.6 km	MPC · JPL
311498	2005 WO_{56}	—	November 29, 2005	Socorro	LINEAR	T_{j} (2.99)	5.2 km	MPC · JPL
311499	2005 WM_{57}	—	November 30, 2005	Mayhill	Mayhill	·	4.7 km	MPC · JPL
311500	2005 WE_{64}	—	November 25, 2005	Kitt Peak	Spacewatch	T_{j} (2.99) · (895)	4.2 km	MPC · JPL

== 311501–311600 ==
back to top

Designation			Discovery			Properties		Ref
Permanent	Provisional	Named after	Date	Site	Discoverer(s)	Category	Diam.	Ref
311501	2005 WT_{66}	—	November 22, 2005	Kitt Peak	Spacewatch	·	3.3 km	MPC · JPL
311502	2005 WV_{68}	—	November 25, 2005	Mount Lemmon	Mount Lemmon Survey	·	5.2 km	MPC · JPL
311503	2005 WU_{74}	—	November 28, 2005	Palomar	NEAT	·	2.5 km	MPC · JPL
311504	2005 WB_{112}	—	November 30, 2005	Mount Lemmon	Mount Lemmon Survey	·	4.0 km	MPC · JPL
311505	2005 WM_{114}	—	November 28, 2005	Socorro	LINEAR	·	4.6 km	MPC · JPL
311506	2005 WL_{117}	—	November 28, 2005	Socorro	LINEAR	EOS	2.9 km	MPC · JPL
311507	2005 WM_{121}	—	November 30, 2005	Mount Lemmon	Mount Lemmon Survey	THM	2.5 km	MPC · JPL
311508	2005 WB_{139}	—	November 26, 2005	Mount Lemmon	Mount Lemmon Survey	·	3.2 km	MPC · JPL
311509	2005 WS_{140}	—	November 26, 2005	Mount Lemmon	Mount Lemmon Survey	·	3.5 km	MPC · JPL
311510	2005 WO_{144}	—	November 24, 2005	Palomar	NEAT	TIR	3.3 km	MPC · JPL
311511	2005 WL_{150}	—	November 28, 2005	Socorro	LINEAR	·	3.7 km	MPC · JPL
311512	2005 WH_{151}	—	November 28, 2005	Socorro	LINEAR	·	4.1 km	MPC · JPL
311513	2005 WX_{155}	—	November 29, 2005	Palomar	NEAT	·	6.0 km	MPC · JPL
311514	2005 WB_{156}	—	November 29, 2005	Palomar	NEAT	·	5.0 km	MPC · JPL
311515	2005 WK_{172}	—	November 5, 2005	Mount Lemmon	Mount Lemmon Survey	·	2.9 km	MPC · JPL
311516	2005 WN_{174}	—	November 30, 2005	Mount Lemmon	Mount Lemmon Survey	THM	2.7 km	MPC · JPL
311517	2005 WY_{178}	—	November 26, 2005	Catalina	CSS	EUP	5.8 km	MPC · JPL
311518	2005 WG_{179}	—	November 21, 2005	Anderson Mesa	LONEOS	·	4.9 km	MPC · JPL
311519	2005 WJ_{190}	—	November 20, 2005	Palomar	NEAT	EUP	5.7 km	MPC · JPL
311520	2005 XH_{3}	—	December 1, 2005	Mount Lemmon	Mount Lemmon Survey	EOS	2.3 km	MPC · JPL
311521	2005 XF_{12}	—	December 1, 2005	Socorro	LINEAR	THM	2.9 km	MPC · JPL
311522	2005 XK_{33}	—	December 4, 2005	Kitt Peak	Spacewatch	·	4.0 km	MPC · JPL
311523	2005 XZ_{77}	—	December 9, 2005	Gnosca	S. Sposetti	·	3.2 km	MPC · JPL
311524	2005 XD_{84}	—	December 7, 2005	Catalina	CSS	·	4.3 km	MPC · JPL
311525	2005 XE_{91}	—	December 10, 2005	Kitt Peak	Spacewatch	·	3.2 km	MPC · JPL
311526	2005 YN_{25}	—	December 24, 2005	Kitt Peak	Spacewatch	(11097) · CYB	2.8 km	MPC · JPL
311527	2005 YL_{34}	—	December 24, 2005	Kitt Peak	Spacewatch	·	4.0 km	MPC · JPL
311528	2005 YL_{41}	—	December 21, 2005	Catalina	CSS	HYG	3.1 km	MPC · JPL
311529	2005 YL_{46}	—	December 25, 2005	Kitt Peak	Spacewatch	·	5.3 km	MPC · JPL
311530	2005 YY_{49}	—	December 25, 2005	Kitt Peak	Spacewatch	CYB	4.2 km	MPC · JPL
311531	2005 YJ_{52}	—	December 26, 2005	Mount Lemmon	Mount Lemmon Survey	CYB	5.3 km	MPC · JPL
311532	2005 YM_{62}	—	December 24, 2005	Kitt Peak	Spacewatch	·	3.1 km	MPC · JPL
311533	2005 YG_{103}	—	December 25, 2005	Kitt Peak	Spacewatch	·	3.7 km	MPC · JPL
311534	2005 YF_{109}	—	December 25, 2005	Kitt Peak	Spacewatch	EOS	2.5 km	MPC · JPL
311535	2005 YB_{112}	—	December 25, 2005	Mount Lemmon	Mount Lemmon Survey	·	3.6 km	MPC · JPL
311536	2005 YO_{116}	—	December 25, 2005	Kitt Peak	Spacewatch	·	860 m	MPC · JPL
311537	2005 YQ_{121}	—	December 28, 2005	Catalina	CSS	EOS	3.0 km	MPC · JPL
311538	2005 YX_{155}	—	December 25, 2005	Kitt Peak	Spacewatch	·	3.6 km	MPC · JPL
311539	2005 YL_{173}	—	December 24, 2005	Socorro	LINEAR	URS	5.5 km	MPC · JPL
311540	2005 YW_{199}	—	December 26, 2005	Kitt Peak	Spacewatch	·	5.0 km	MPC · JPL
311541	2005 YG_{213}	—	December 29, 2005	Palomar	NEAT	·	5.8 km	MPC · JPL
311542	2005 YF_{214}	—	December 30, 2005	Catalina	CSS	·	3.4 km	MPC · JPL
311543	2005 YS_{220}	—	December 29, 2005	Palomar	NEAT	TIR	3.8 km	MPC · JPL
311544	2005 YE_{231}	—	December 27, 2005	Mount Lemmon	Mount Lemmon Survey	HYG	3.1 km	MPC · JPL
311545	2005 YP_{234}	—	December 28, 2005	Kitt Peak	Spacewatch	·	2.8 km	MPC · JPL
311546	2005 YD_{250}	—	December 28, 2005	Kitt Peak	Spacewatch	CYB	4.4 km	MPC · JPL
311547	2005 YV_{274}	—	December 25, 2005	Catalina	CSS	·	4.7 km	MPC · JPL
311548	2006 AG_{7}	—	January 5, 2006	Anderson Mesa	LONEOS	CYB	6.0 km	MPC · JPL
311549	2006 AQ_{13}	—	January 5, 2006	Mount Lemmon	Mount Lemmon Survey	·	3.5 km	MPC · JPL
311550	2006 AR_{53}	—	January 5, 2006	Kitt Peak	Spacewatch	·	760 m	MPC · JPL
311551	2006 AC_{91}	—	January 6, 2006	Mount Lemmon	Mount Lemmon Survey	(1298)	4.1 km	MPC · JPL
311552	2006 BN_{54}	—	January 25, 2006	Kitt Peak	Spacewatch	·	720 m	MPC · JPL
311553	2006 BN_{100}	—	January 28, 2006	7300	W. K. Y. Yeung	·	3.7 km	MPC · JPL
311554	2006 BQ_{147}	—	January 31, 2006	Siding Spring	SSS	ATE	380 m	MPC · JPL
311555	2006 BA_{148}	—	January 31, 2006	Kitt Peak	Spacewatch	APO	760 m	MPC · JPL
311556	2006 BF_{165}	—	January 26, 2006	Catalina	CSS	·	1.5 km	MPC · JPL
311557	2006 BY_{199}	—	January 30, 2006	Kitt Peak	Spacewatch	·	790 m	MPC · JPL
311558	2006 BE_{216}	—	January 26, 2006	Catalina	CSS	·	3.4 km	MPC · JPL
311559	2006 BK_{226}	—	January 30, 2006	Kitt Peak	Spacewatch	·	760 m	MPC · JPL
311560	2006 BS_{227}	—	January 30, 2006	Kitt Peak	Spacewatch	·	1.0 km	MPC · JPL
311561	2006 BF_{252}	—	January 31, 2006	Kitt Peak	Spacewatch	·	600 m	MPC · JPL
311562	2006 CF_{8}	—	February 1, 2006	Mount Lemmon	Mount Lemmon Survey	·	930 m	MPC · JPL
311563	2006 CY_{37}	—	February 2, 2006	Mount Lemmon	Mount Lemmon Survey	·	530 m	MPC · JPL
311564	2006 DA_{39}	—	February 21, 2006	Mount Lemmon	Mount Lemmon Survey	·	800 m	MPC · JPL
311565	2006 DN_{46}	—	February 20, 2006	Catalina	CSS	·	870 m	MPC · JPL
311566	2006 DK_{150}	—	February 25, 2006	Kitt Peak	Spacewatch	·	980 m	MPC · JPL
311567	2006 DA_{176}	—	February 27, 2006	Mount Lemmon	Mount Lemmon Survey	·	1.2 km	MPC · JPL
311568	2006 DP_{214}	—	February 20, 2006	Kitt Peak	Spacewatch	·	920 m	MPC · JPL
311569	2006 EN_{33}	—	March 3, 2006	Catalina	CSS	·	1.1 km	MPC · JPL
311570	2006 FB_{17}	—	March 23, 2006	Mount Lemmon	Mount Lemmon Survey	·	900 m	MPC · JPL
311571	2006 FG_{18}	—	March 23, 2006	Kitt Peak	Spacewatch	·	1.3 km	MPC · JPL
311572	2006 FH_{42}	—	March 26, 2006	Mount Lemmon	Mount Lemmon Survey	·	830 m	MPC · JPL
311573	2006 GA_{7}	—	April 2, 2006	Kitt Peak	Spacewatch	·	1.4 km	MPC · JPL
311574	2006 GT_{12}	—	April 2, 2006	Kitt Peak	Spacewatch	·	840 m	MPC · JPL
311575	2006 GX_{26}	—	April 2, 2006	Kitt Peak	Spacewatch	·	1.2 km	MPC · JPL
311576	2006 GQ_{27}	—	February 6, 1995	Kitt Peak	Spacewatch	·	2.5 km	MPC · JPL
311577	2006 GZ_{30}	—	April 2, 2006	Mount Lemmon	Mount Lemmon Survey	·	1.1 km	MPC · JPL
311578	2006 GO_{40}	—	April 6, 2006	Catalina	CSS	·	970 m	MPC · JPL
311579	2006 HM_{5}	—	April 19, 2006	Catalina	CSS	V	870 m	MPC · JPL
311580	2006 HF_{30}	—	April 19, 2006	Palomar	NEAT	·	1.5 km	MPC · JPL
311581	2006 HO_{35}	—	April 19, 2006	Catalina	CSS	·	990 m	MPC · JPL
311582	2006 HN_{45}	—	April 25, 2006	Kitt Peak	Spacewatch	V	760 m	MPC · JPL
311583	2006 HL_{49}	—	April 25, 2006	Kitt Peak	Spacewatch	·	1.0 km	MPC · JPL
311584	2006 HY_{65}	—	April 24, 2006	Kitt Peak	Spacewatch	CLA	2.0 km	MPC · JPL
311585	2006 HN_{71}	—	April 25, 2006	Kitt Peak	Spacewatch	·	1.0 km	MPC · JPL
311586	2006 HV_{96}	—	April 30, 2006	Kitt Peak	Spacewatch	(2076)	920 m	MPC · JPL
311587	2006 HS_{102}	—	April 30, 2006	Kitt Peak	Spacewatch	V	830 m	MPC · JPL
311588	2006 HT_{120}	—	April 30, 2006	Kitt Peak	Spacewatch	V	850 m	MPC · JPL
311589	2006 HZ_{151}	—	April 21, 2006	Catalina	CSS	·	1.2 km	MPC · JPL
311590	2006 HB_{152}	—	April 24, 2006	Mount Lemmon	Mount Lemmon Survey	·	1.6 km	MPC · JPL
311591	2006 JY_{35}	—	May 4, 2006	Kitt Peak	Spacewatch	·	1.2 km	MPC · JPL
311592	2006 JC_{42}	—	May 9, 2006	Mount Lemmon	Mount Lemmon Survey	L4	10 km	MPC · JPL
311593	2006 JO_{45}	—	May 8, 2006	Mount Lemmon	Mount Lemmon Survey	·	960 m	MPC · JPL
311594	2006 KN_{23}	—	May 16, 2006	Siding Spring	SSS	·	1.0 km	MPC · JPL
311595	2006 KL_{29}	—	May 20, 2006	Kitt Peak	Spacewatch	·	1.4 km	MPC · JPL
311596	2006 KY_{40}	—	May 6, 2006	Mount Lemmon	Mount Lemmon Survey	·	940 m	MPC · JPL
311597	2006 KT_{48}	—	May 21, 2006	Kitt Peak	Spacewatch	·	1.3 km	MPC · JPL
311598	2006 KL_{59}	—	May 22, 2006	Kitt Peak	Spacewatch	·	1.2 km	MPC · JPL
311599	2006 KN_{59}	—	May 22, 2006	Kitt Peak	Spacewatch	V	820 m	MPC · JPL
311600	2006 KH_{67}	—	May 24, 2006	Mount Lemmon	Mount Lemmon Survey	·	1.0 km	MPC · JPL

== 311601–311700 ==
back to top

Designation			Discovery			Properties		Ref
Permanent	Provisional	Named after	Date	Site	Discoverer(s)	Category	Diam.	Ref
311601	2006 KD_{72}	—	May 22, 2006	Kitt Peak	Spacewatch	·	1.2 km	MPC · JPL
311602	2006 KA_{91}	—	May 24, 2006	Mount Lemmon	Mount Lemmon Survey	·	1.1 km	MPC · JPL
311603	2006 KD_{121}	—	May 21, 2006	Siding Spring	SSS	·	2.2 km	MPC · JPL
311604 Axelmurk	2006 KD_{137}	Axelmurk	May 25, 2006	Mauna Kea	P. A. Wiegert	NYS	1.2 km	MPC · JPL
311605	2006 MK_{7}	—	June 18, 2006	Kitt Peak	Spacewatch	·	1.7 km	MPC · JPL
311606	2006 MW_{7}	—	June 18, 2006	Kitt Peak	Spacewatch	·	1.8 km	MPC · JPL
311607	2006 MV_{8}	—	June 19, 2006	Mount Lemmon	Mount Lemmon Survey	BRG	1.5 km	MPC · JPL
311608	2006 OT_{2}	—	July 20, 2006	Socorro	LINEAR	JUN	1.6 km	MPC · JPL
311609	2006 OC_{16}	—	July 30, 2006	Reedy Creek	J. Broughton	·	1.8 km	MPC · JPL
311610	2006 OE_{17}	—	July 21, 2006	Catalina	CSS	·	3.4 km	MPC · JPL
311611	2006 OD_{20}	—	July 18, 2006	Siding Spring	SSS	·	1.9 km	MPC · JPL
311612	2006 PV_{11}	—	August 13, 2006	Palomar	NEAT	·	1.7 km	MPC · JPL
311613	2006 PD_{25}	—	August 13, 2006	Palomar	NEAT	·	2.1 km	MPC · JPL
311614	2006 PA_{29}	—	August 10, 2006	Palomar	NEAT	·	2.7 km	MPC · JPL
311615	2006 PP_{31}	—	August 14, 2006	Siding Spring	SSS	L4	13 km	MPC · JPL
311616	2006 PT_{40}	—	August 14, 2006	Palomar	NEAT	·	1.4 km	MPC · JPL
311617	2006 PS_{43}	—	August 12, 2006	Palomar	NEAT	EUN	1.8 km	MPC · JPL
311618	2006 QO_{3}	—	August 18, 2006	Socorro	LINEAR	·	2.4 km	MPC · JPL
311619	2006 QV_{5}	—	August 18, 2006	Reedy Creek	J. Broughton	JUN	1.5 km	MPC · JPL
311620	2006 QM_{7}	—	August 18, 2006	Kitt Peak	Spacewatch	·	2.2 km	MPC · JPL
311621	2006 QZ_{12}	—	August 16, 2006	Siding Spring	SSS	·	1.2 km	MPC · JPL
311622	2006 QW_{20}	—	August 18, 2006	Anderson Mesa	LONEOS	·	2.6 km	MPC · JPL
311623	2006 QZ_{22}	—	August 19, 2006	Anderson Mesa	LONEOS	JUN	1.6 km	MPC · JPL
311624	2006 QA_{23}	—	August 19, 2006	Anderson Mesa	LONEOS	·	4.1 km	MPC · JPL
311625	2006 QK_{23}	—	August 20, 2006	Dax	Dax	·	3.0 km	MPC · JPL
311626	2006 QF_{28}	—	August 20, 2006	Kitt Peak	Spacewatch	·	2.0 km	MPC · JPL
311627	2006 QW_{38}	—	August 18, 2006	Anderson Mesa	LONEOS	·	2.9 km	MPC · JPL
311628	2006 QL_{51}	—	August 23, 2006	Palomar	NEAT	EUN	1.0 km	MPC · JPL
311629	2006 QC_{57}	—	August 19, 2006	Kitt Peak	Spacewatch	·	1.3 km	MPC · JPL
311630	2006 QG_{66}	—	August 20, 2006	Palomar	NEAT	·	1.8 km	MPC · JPL
311631	2006 QS_{115}	—	August 27, 2006	Anderson Mesa	LONEOS	·	2.6 km	MPC · JPL
311632	2006 QS_{126}	—	August 16, 2006	Palomar	NEAT	·	1.7 km	MPC · JPL
311633	2006 QC_{130}	—	August 19, 2006	Palomar	NEAT	NEM	2.4 km	MPC · JPL
311634	2006 QB_{131}	—	August 20, 2006	Palomar	NEAT	·	2.8 km	MPC · JPL
311635	2006 QK_{131}	—	August 22, 2006	Palomar	NEAT	·	2.8 km	MPC · JPL
311636	2006 QZ_{144}	—	August 29, 2006	Anderson Mesa	LONEOS	·	2.2 km	MPC · JPL
311637	2006 QN_{167}	—	August 30, 2006	Anderson Mesa	LONEOS	·	1.6 km	MPC · JPL
311638	2006 QV_{168}	—	August 30, 2006	Anderson Mesa	LONEOS	·	1.4 km	MPC · JPL
311639	2006 QZ_{168}	—	August 30, 2006	Anderson Mesa	LONEOS	·	1.4 km	MPC · JPL
311640	2006 QB_{186}	—	August 28, 2006	Kitt Peak	Spacewatch	·	1.5 km	MPC · JPL
311641	2006 RZ_{1}	—	September 11, 2006	Catalina	CSS	ADE	2.0 km	MPC · JPL
311642	2006 RH_{5}	—	September 14, 2006	Catalina	CSS	·	1.5 km	MPC · JPL
311643	2006 RY_{6}	—	September 14, 2006	Catalina	CSS	HNS	1.7 km	MPC · JPL
311644	2006 RH_{14}	—	September 14, 2006	Kitt Peak	Spacewatch	·	1.7 km	MPC · JPL
311645	2006 RW_{22}	—	September 15, 2006	Goodricke-Pigott	R. A. Tucker	·	3.1 km	MPC · JPL
311646	2006 RG_{32}	—	September 15, 2006	Kitt Peak	Spacewatch	·	2.1 km	MPC · JPL
311647	2006 RO_{32}	—	September 15, 2006	Kitt Peak	Spacewatch	·	1.6 km	MPC · JPL
311648	2006 RN_{34}	—	September 12, 2006	Catalina	CSS	AEO	1.7 km	MPC · JPL
311649	2006 RJ_{35}	—	September 14, 2006	Catalina	CSS	NEM	2.6 km	MPC · JPL
311650	2006 RN_{62}	—	September 12, 2006	Catalina	CSS	·	2.3 km	MPC · JPL
311651	2006 RA_{69}	—	September 15, 2006	Kitt Peak	Spacewatch	·	1.5 km	MPC · JPL
311652	2006 RR_{70}	—	September 15, 2006	Kitt Peak	Spacewatch	·	1.7 km	MPC · JPL
311653	2006 RA_{76}	—	September 15, 2006	Kitt Peak	Spacewatch	·	1.4 km	MPC · JPL
311654	2006 RQ_{84}	—	September 15, 2006	Kitt Peak	Spacewatch	·	2.0 km	MPC · JPL
311655	2006 RL_{88}	—	September 15, 2006	Kitt Peak	Spacewatch	·	1.7 km	MPC · JPL
311656	2006 RE_{89}	—	September 15, 2006	Kitt Peak	Spacewatch	·	1.5 km	MPC · JPL
311657	2006 RS_{94}	—	September 15, 2006	Kitt Peak	Spacewatch	·	3.5 km	MPC · JPL
311658	2006 RW_{120}	—	September 14, 2006	Kitt Peak	Spacewatch	·	1.9 km	MPC · JPL
311659	2006 SS_{8}	—	September 16, 2006	Catalina	CSS	·	2.2 km	MPC · JPL
311660	2006 SV_{13}	—	September 17, 2006	Kitt Peak	Spacewatch	·	1.6 km	MPC · JPL
311661	2006 SQ_{15}	—	September 17, 2006	Catalina	CSS	·	1.6 km	MPC · JPL
311662	2006 SX_{15}	—	September 17, 2006	Catalina	CSS	·	2.4 km	MPC · JPL
311663	2006 SK_{27}	—	September 16, 2006	Catalina	CSS	GEF	1.5 km	MPC · JPL
311664	2006 SS_{28}	—	September 17, 2006	Kitt Peak	Spacewatch	·	1.6 km	MPC · JPL
311665	2006 SM_{33}	—	September 17, 2006	Catalina	CSS	·	2.5 km	MPC · JPL
311666	2006 SG_{35}	—	September 17, 2006	Kitt Peak	Spacewatch	·	2.0 km	MPC · JPL
311667	2006 SU_{35}	—	September 17, 2006	Anderson Mesa	LONEOS	·	2.5 km	MPC · JPL
311668	2006 SM_{39}	—	September 18, 2006	Catalina	CSS	·	2.3 km	MPC · JPL
311669	2006 ST_{39}	—	September 18, 2006	Catalina	CSS	MIS	2.7 km	MPC · JPL
311670	2006 SM_{46}	—	September 19, 2006	Anderson Mesa	LONEOS	·	1.9 km	MPC · JPL
311671	2006 SC_{48}	—	September 19, 2006	Kitt Peak	Spacewatch	·	1.5 km	MPC · JPL
311672	2006 SJ_{51}	—	September 17, 2006	Anderson Mesa	LONEOS	(5)	1.7 km	MPC · JPL
311673	2006 SX_{53}	—	September 16, 2006	Catalina	CSS	·	2.2 km	MPC · JPL
311674	2006 SU_{56}	—	September 20, 2006	Catalina	CSS	·	3.0 km	MPC · JPL
311675	2006 SZ_{60}	—	September 18, 2006	Catalina	CSS	MAR	1.8 km	MPC · JPL
311676	2006 SU_{62}	—	September 18, 2006	Catalina	CSS	HNS	1.6 km	MPC · JPL
311677	2006 SN_{64}	—	September 17, 2006	Kitt Peak	Spacewatch	DOR	2.5 km	MPC · JPL
311678	2006 SJ_{66}	—	September 19, 2006	Kitt Peak	Spacewatch	·	1.6 km	MPC · JPL
311679	2006 SD_{70}	—	September 19, 2006	Kitt Peak	Spacewatch	·	1.7 km	MPC · JPL
311680	2006 SL_{74}	—	September 19, 2006	Kitt Peak	Spacewatch	·	1.8 km	MPC · JPL
311681	2006 SV_{77}	—	September 17, 2006	Kitt Peak	Spacewatch	·	2.2 km	MPC · JPL
311682	2006 SB_{79}	—	September 17, 2006	Catalina	CSS	MAR	1.7 km	MPC · JPL
311683	2006 SY_{82}	—	September 18, 2006	Kitt Peak	Spacewatch	·	3.1 km	MPC · JPL
311684	2006 SN_{91}	—	September 18, 2006	Kitt Peak	Spacewatch	·	1.6 km	MPC · JPL
311685	2006 SD_{94}	—	September 18, 2006	Kitt Peak	Spacewatch	AST	2.6 km	MPC · JPL
311686	2006 SJ_{95}	—	September 18, 2006	Kitt Peak	Spacewatch	·	1.6 km	MPC · JPL
311687	2006 SR_{102}	—	September 19, 2006	Kitt Peak	Spacewatch	(13314)	1.4 km	MPC · JPL
311688	2006 SF_{113}	—	September 23, 2006	Kitt Peak	Spacewatch	·	1.7 km	MPC · JPL
311689	2006 SC_{117}	—	September 24, 2006	Kitt Peak	Spacewatch	·	1.8 km	MPC · JPL
311690	2006 SO_{119}	—	September 18, 2006	Catalina	CSS	AEO	1.7 km	MPC · JPL
311691	2006 SV_{119}	—	September 18, 2006	Catalina	CSS	·	3.2 km	MPC · JPL
311692	2006 SD_{120}	—	September 18, 2006	Catalina	CSS	·	2.1 km	MPC · JPL
311693	2006 SO_{120}	—	September 18, 2006	Catalina	CSS	·	2.0 km	MPC · JPL
311694	2006 SN_{122}	—	September 19, 2006	Catalina	CSS	·	2.0 km	MPC · JPL
311695	2006 SL_{130}	—	September 20, 2006	Anderson Mesa	LONEOS	·	2.7 km	MPC · JPL
311696	2006 SK_{141}	—	September 25, 2006	Anderson Mesa	LONEOS	·	2.0 km	MPC · JPL
311697	2006 SD_{142}	—	September 19, 2006	Kitt Peak	Spacewatch	·	1.2 km	MPC · JPL
311698	2006 SW_{142}	—	September 19, 2006	Kitt Peak	Spacewatch	DOR	2.4 km	MPC · JPL
311699	2006 SY_{142}	—	September 19, 2006	Kitt Peak	Spacewatch	·	1.9 km	MPC · JPL
311700	2006 SY_{148}	—	September 19, 2006	Kitt Peak	Spacewatch	·	2.1 km	MPC · JPL

== 311701–311800 ==
back to top

Designation			Discovery			Properties		Ref
Permanent	Provisional	Named after	Date	Site	Discoverer(s)	Category	Diam.	Ref
311701	2006 SP_{158}	—	September 23, 2006	Kitt Peak	Spacewatch	·	1.2 km	MPC · JPL
311702	2006 SS_{189}	—	September 26, 2006	Kitt Peak	Spacewatch	·	1.7 km	MPC · JPL
311703	2006 SB_{193}	—	September 26, 2006	Mount Lemmon	Mount Lemmon Survey	EUN	1.6 km	MPC · JPL
311704	2006 SX_{196}	—	September 26, 2006	Catalina	CSS	·	2.1 km	MPC · JPL
311705	2006 SB_{198}	—	September 27, 2006	Črni Vrh	J. Skvarč, B. Dintinjana	(194)	2.0 km	MPC · JPL
311706	2006 SJ_{221}	—	September 25, 2006	Mount Lemmon	Mount Lemmon Survey	·	1.7 km	MPC · JPL
311707	2006 SG_{256}	—	September 26, 2006	Kitt Peak	Spacewatch	·	1.6 km	MPC · JPL
311708	2006 SS_{272}	—	September 27, 2006	Kitt Peak	Spacewatch	·	1.8 km	MPC · JPL
311709	2006 SX_{286}	—	September 22, 2006	Anderson Mesa	LONEOS	JUN	1.3 km	MPC · JPL
311710	2006 SH_{292}	—	September 25, 2006	Kitt Peak	Spacewatch	·	1.8 km	MPC · JPL
311711	2006 SN_{325}	—	September 27, 2006	Kitt Peak	Spacewatch	AST	1.7 km	MPC · JPL
311712	2006 SF_{332}	—	September 28, 2006	Mount Lemmon	Mount Lemmon Survey	·	2.3 km	MPC · JPL
311713	2006 SL_{340}	—	September 28, 2006	Kitt Peak	Spacewatch	·	1.4 km	MPC · JPL
311714	2006 ST_{350}	—	September 30, 2006	Catalina	CSS	·	1.8 km	MPC · JPL
311715	2006 SS_{352}	—	September 30, 2006	Catalina	CSS	·	2.2 km	MPC · JPL
311716	2006 ST_{352}	—	September 30, 2006	Catalina	CSS	MRX	1.2 km	MPC · JPL
311717	2006 SJ_{356}	—	September 30, 2006	Catalina	CSS	·	2.1 km	MPC · JPL
311718	2006 SG_{359}	—	September 30, 2006	Catalina	CSS	·	2.8 km	MPC · JPL
311719	2006 SL_{359}	—	September 30, 2006	Catalina	CSS	·	2.5 km	MPC · JPL
311720	2006 SA_{364}	—	September 27, 2006	Kitt Peak	Spacewatch	·	1.6 km	MPC · JPL
311721	2006 ST_{367}	—	September 27, 2006	Catalina	CSS	·	2.6 km	MPC · JPL
311722	2006 SL_{368}	—	September 25, 2006	Kitt Peak	Spacewatch	·	2.0 km	MPC · JPL
311723	2006 SB_{374}	—	September 16, 2006	Apache Point	A. C. Becker	WIT	1.1 km	MPC · JPL
311724	2006 SO_{377}	—	September 17, 2006	Apache Point	A. C. Becker	·	2.4 km	MPC · JPL
311725	2006 SW_{378}	—	September 18, 2006	Apache Point	A. C. Becker	·	1.9 km	MPC · JPL
311726	2006 SZ_{378}	—	September 18, 2006	Apache Point	A. C. Becker	·	2.3 km	MPC · JPL
311727	2006 SY_{380}	—	September 27, 2006	Apache Point	A. C. Becker	EUN	1.5 km	MPC · JPL
311728	2006 SK_{382}	—	September 28, 2006	Apache Point	A. C. Becker	·	2.3 km	MPC · JPL
311729	2006 SW_{390}	—	September 17, 2006	Kitt Peak	Spacewatch	·	1.9 km	MPC · JPL
311730	2006 SV_{392}	—	September 27, 2006	Mount Lemmon	Mount Lemmon Survey	·	2.3 km	MPC · JPL
311731	2006 SX_{393}	—	September 30, 2006	Mount Lemmon	Mount Lemmon Survey	·	1.8 km	MPC · JPL
311732	2006 SN_{396}	—	September 17, 2006	Kitt Peak	Spacewatch	·	1.2 km	MPC · JPL
311733	2006 SV_{402}	—	September 26, 2006	Mount Lemmon	Mount Lemmon Survey	·	1.8 km	MPC · JPL
311734	2006 SJ_{403}	—	September 27, 2006	Mount Lemmon	Mount Lemmon Survey	·	2.2 km	MPC · JPL
311735	2006 ST_{404}	—	September 30, 2006	Mount Lemmon	Mount Lemmon Survey	·	1.7 km	MPC · JPL
311736	2006 SP_{411}	—	September 17, 2006	Catalina	CSS	MAR	1.2 km	MPC · JPL
311737	2006 SQ_{412}	—	September 24, 2006	Anderson Mesa	LONEOS	·	4.8 km	MPC · JPL
311738	2006 SV_{412}	—	September 19, 2006	Catalina	CSS	·	2.7 km	MPC · JPL
311739	2006 TW_{7}	—	October 2, 2006	Mount Lemmon	Mount Lemmon Survey	·	1.4 km	MPC · JPL
311740	2006 TQ_{8}	—	October 4, 2006	Mount Lemmon	Mount Lemmon Survey	·	1.5 km	MPC · JPL
311741	2006 TK_{16}	—	October 11, 2006	Kitt Peak	Spacewatch	·	2.1 km	MPC · JPL
311742	2006 TY_{17}	—	October 11, 2006	Kitt Peak	Spacewatch	·	2.3 km	MPC · JPL
311743	2006 TZ_{22}	—	October 11, 2006	Kitt Peak	Spacewatch	·	2.7 km	MPC · JPL
311744	2006 TF_{23}	—	October 11, 2006	Kitt Peak	Spacewatch	·	2.6 km	MPC · JPL
311745	2006 TO_{24}	—	October 12, 2006	Kitt Peak	Spacewatch	AGN	1.2 km	MPC · JPL
311746	2006 TT_{25}	—	October 12, 2006	Kitt Peak	Spacewatch	ADE	3.7 km	MPC · JPL
311747	2006 TZ_{29}	—	October 12, 2006	Kitt Peak	Spacewatch	·	2.3 km	MPC · JPL
311748	2006 TD_{34}	—	October 12, 2006	Palomar	NEAT	·	2.0 km	MPC · JPL
311749	2006 TN_{48}	—	October 12, 2006	Kitt Peak	Spacewatch	·	1.7 km	MPC · JPL
311750	2006 TE_{59}	—	October 13, 2006	Kitt Peak	Spacewatch	·	1.8 km	MPC · JPL
311751	2006 TP_{68}	—	October 11, 2006	Palomar	NEAT	·	1.7 km	MPC · JPL
311752	2006 TF_{70}	—	October 11, 2006	Palomar	NEAT	·	2.8 km	MPC · JPL
311753	2006 TS_{71}	—	October 11, 2006	Palomar	NEAT	·	2.0 km	MPC · JPL
311754	2006 TA_{77}	—	October 11, 2006	Palomar	NEAT	·	2.9 km	MPC · JPL
311755	2006 TP_{81}	—	October 2, 2006	Mount Lemmon	Mount Lemmon Survey	·	1.8 km	MPC · JPL
311756	2006 TE_{83}	—	October 13, 2006	Kitt Peak	Spacewatch	·	2.5 km	MPC · JPL
311757	2006 TK_{86}	—	October 13, 2006	Kitt Peak	Spacewatch	GEF	1.7 km	MPC · JPL
311758	2006 TJ_{93}	—	October 15, 2006	Kitt Peak	Spacewatch	·	2.2 km	MPC · JPL
311759	2006 TQ_{94}	—	October 15, 2006	Lulin	Lin, C.-S., Q. Ye	·	1.9 km	MPC · JPL
311760	2006 TO_{96}	—	October 12, 2006	Palomar	NEAT	ADE · slow	3.1 km	MPC · JPL
311761	2006 TO_{99}	—	September 24, 2006	Kitt Peak	Spacewatch	·	2.1 km	MPC · JPL
311762	2006 TC_{102}	—	October 15, 2006	Kitt Peak	Spacewatch	NEM	2.5 km	MPC · JPL
311763	2006 TV_{103}	—	October 15, 2006	Kitt Peak	Spacewatch	AGN	1.2 km	MPC · JPL
311764	2006 TW_{109}	—	October 12, 2006	Kitt Peak	Spacewatch	·	2.1 km	MPC · JPL
311765	2006 TT_{113}	—	October 1, 2006	Apache Point	A. C. Becker	·	2.1 km	MPC · JPL
311766	2006 TX_{122}	—	October 12, 2006	Palomar	NEAT	·	1.7 km	MPC · JPL
311767	2006 TZ_{122}	—	October 12, 2006	Kitt Peak	Spacewatch	·	1.6 km	MPC · JPL
311768	2006 TB_{123}	—	October 12, 2006	Kitt Peak	Spacewatch	·	1.6 km	MPC · JPL
311769	2006 TJ_{128}	—	October 4, 2006	Mount Lemmon	Mount Lemmon Survey	·	1.9 km	MPC · JPL
311770	2006 UB_{3}	—	October 16, 2006	Catalina	CSS	NEM	3.2 km	MPC · JPL
311771	2006 UO_{3}	—	October 16, 2006	Catalina	CSS	·	2.6 km	MPC · JPL
311772	2006 UM_{4}	—	October 16, 2006	Kitt Peak	Spacewatch	·	1.7 km	MPC · JPL
311773	2006 UP_{5}	—	October 16, 2006	Catalina	CSS	NEM	2.4 km	MPC · JPL
311774	2006 UO_{6}	—	October 16, 2006	Catalina	CSS	·	2.0 km	MPC · JPL
311775	2006 UJ_{18}	—	October 16, 2006	Mount Lemmon	Mount Lemmon Survey	·	1.2 km	MPC · JPL
311776	2006 UU_{21}	—	October 16, 2006	Kitt Peak	Spacewatch	MRX	990 m	MPC · JPL
311777	2006 UH_{29}	—	October 16, 2006	Kitt Peak	Spacewatch	HOF	2.5 km	MPC · JPL
311778	2006 UO_{42}	—	October 16, 2006	Kitt Peak	Spacewatch	AGN	1.4 km	MPC · JPL
311779	2006 UP_{42}	—	October 16, 2006	Kitt Peak	Spacewatch	·	3.1 km	MPC · JPL
311780	2006 UL_{44}	—	October 16, 2006	Kitt Peak	Spacewatch	·	2.1 km	MPC · JPL
311781	2006 UH_{52}	—	October 17, 2006	Mount Lemmon	Mount Lemmon Survey	·	1.8 km	MPC · JPL
311782	2006 UT_{52}	—	October 17, 2006	Catalina	CSS	AEO	1.2 km	MPC · JPL
311783	2006 UL_{59}	—	October 19, 2006	Catalina	CSS	·	4.0 km	MPC · JPL
311784	2006 UT_{61}	—	October 17, 2006	Andrushivka	Andrushivka	·	2.2 km	MPC · JPL
311785 Erwanmazarico	2006 UB_{62}	Erwanmazarico	October 19, 2006	Front Royal	Skillman, D. R.	·	2.4 km	MPC · JPL
311786 Mykolaleontovych	2006 UW_{62}	Mykolaleontovych	October 17, 2006	Andrushivka	Andrushivka	DOR	2.6 km	MPC · JPL
311787	2006 UD_{65}	—	October 16, 2006	Kitt Peak	Spacewatch	·	2.2 km	MPC · JPL
311788	2006 UZ_{66}	—	October 16, 2006	Mount Lemmon	Mount Lemmon Survey	·	1.4 km	MPC · JPL
311789	2006 UK_{73}	—	October 17, 2006	Kitt Peak	Spacewatch	·	2.2 km	MPC · JPL
311790	2006 UL_{73}	—	October 17, 2006	Kitt Peak	Spacewatch	·	1.5 km	MPC · JPL
311791	2006 UE_{74}	—	October 17, 2006	Kitt Peak	Spacewatch	·	2.0 km	MPC · JPL
311792	2006 UK_{74}	—	October 17, 2006	Kitt Peak	Spacewatch	·	2.4 km	MPC · JPL
311793	2006 UH_{78}	—	October 17, 2006	Kitt Peak	Spacewatch	WIT	1.2 km	MPC · JPL
311794	2006 UJ_{85}	—	October 17, 2006	Mount Lemmon	Mount Lemmon Survey	AGN	1.2 km	MPC · JPL
311795	2006 UJ_{86}	—	October 17, 2006	Mount Lemmon	Mount Lemmon Survey	AGN	1.3 km	MPC · JPL
311796	2006 UO_{93}	—	October 18, 2006	Kitt Peak	Spacewatch	·	2.0 km	MPC · JPL
311797	2006 UV_{104}	—	October 18, 2006	Kitt Peak	Spacewatch	·	1.7 km	MPC · JPL
311798	2006 UD_{118}	—	October 19, 2006	Kitt Peak	Spacewatch	·	1.9 km	MPC · JPL
311799	2006 UK_{124}	—	October 19, 2006	Catalina	CSS	EUN	1.7 km	MPC · JPL
311800	2006 US_{125}	—	October 19, 2006	Kitt Peak	Spacewatch	HOF	2.5 km	MPC · JPL

== 311801–311900 ==
back to top

Designation			Discovery			Properties		Ref
Permanent	Provisional	Named after	Date	Site	Discoverer(s)	Category	Diam.	Ref
311801	2006 UM_{137}	—	October 19, 2006	Catalina	CSS	526	3.2 km	MPC · JPL
311802	2006 UZ_{137}	—	October 19, 2006	Kitt Peak	Spacewatch	·	2.2 km	MPC · JPL
311803	2006 UC_{140}	—	October 19, 2006	Kitt Peak	Spacewatch	·	2.7 km	MPC · JPL
311804	2006 UC_{144}	—	October 19, 2006	Kitt Peak	Spacewatch	AGN	1.5 km	MPC · JPL
311805	2006 UF_{149}	—	October 20, 2006	Kitt Peak	Spacewatch	·	1.6 km	MPC · JPL
311806	2006 UT_{167}	—	October 21, 2006	Mount Lemmon	Mount Lemmon Survey	·	1.6 km	MPC · JPL
311807	2006 UL_{179}	—	October 16, 2006	Catalina	CSS	·	1.9 km	MPC · JPL
311808	2006 UO_{180}	—	October 16, 2006	Catalina	CSS	·	2.1 km	MPC · JPL
311809	2006 UO_{188}	—	October 19, 2006	Catalina	CSS	·	1.9 km	MPC · JPL
311810	2006 UV_{194}	—	October 20, 2006	Kitt Peak	Spacewatch	·	1.9 km	MPC · JPL
311811	2006 UM_{196}	—	October 20, 2006	Kitt Peak	Spacewatch	·	2.4 km	MPC · JPL
311812	2006 UT_{203}	—	October 22, 2006	Palomar	NEAT	·	4.0 km	MPC · JPL
311813	2006 UC_{207}	—	October 23, 2006	Kitt Peak	Spacewatch	·	2.4 km	MPC · JPL
311814	2006 UT_{208}	—	October 23, 2006	Kitt Peak	Spacewatch	·	3.2 km	MPC · JPL
311815	2006 UV_{209}	—	October 23, 2006	Kitt Peak	Spacewatch	·	2.8 km	MPC · JPL
311816	2006 UH_{212}	—	October 23, 2006	Kitt Peak	Spacewatch	·	2.0 km	MPC · JPL
311817	2006 UT_{213}	—	October 23, 2006	Kitt Peak	Spacewatch	·	2.3 km	MPC · JPL
311818	2006 UZ_{218}	—	October 16, 2006	Catalina	CSS	·	2.3 km	MPC · JPL
311819	2006 UY_{247}	—	October 27, 2006	Mount Lemmon	Mount Lemmon Survey	·	3.3 km	MPC · JPL
311820	2006 UM_{253}	—	October 27, 2006	Mount Lemmon	Mount Lemmon Survey	AGN	1.4 km	MPC · JPL
311821	2006 UB_{264}	—	October 27, 2006	Kitt Peak	Spacewatch	·	1.9 km	MPC · JPL
311822	2006 UR_{265}	—	October 27, 2006	Catalina	CSS	·	3.2 km	MPC · JPL
311823	2006 UR_{266}	—	October 27, 2006	Kitt Peak	Spacewatch	·	2.2 km	MPC · JPL
311824	2006 UY_{276}	—	October 28, 2006	Kitt Peak	Spacewatch	·	1.6 km	MPC · JPL
311825	2006 UA_{286}	—	October 28, 2006	Kitt Peak	Spacewatch	·	2.7 km	MPC · JPL
311826	2006 UX_{331}	—	October 21, 2006	Apache Point	A. C. Becker	·	1.6 km	MPC · JPL
311827	2006 UL_{337}	—	October 22, 2006	Mount Lemmon	Mount Lemmon Survey	·	4.1 km	MPC · JPL
311828	2006 UR_{346}	—	October 23, 2006	Catalina	CSS	·	2.3 km	MPC · JPL
311829	2006 VG_{3}	—	November 9, 2006	Kitt Peak	Spacewatch	·	2.1 km	MPC · JPL
311830	2006 VX_{10}	—	November 11, 2006	Catalina	CSS	AGN	1.5 km	MPC · JPL
311831	2006 VS_{13}	—	November 13, 2006	Wrightwood	J. W. Young	AGN	1.2 km	MPC · JPL
311832	2006 VK_{18}	—	November 9, 2006	Kitt Peak	Spacewatch	·	2.3 km	MPC · JPL
311833	2006 VM_{20}	—	November 9, 2006	Kitt Peak	Spacewatch	KOR	1.3 km	MPC · JPL
311834	2006 VK_{23}	—	November 10, 2006	Kitt Peak	Spacewatch	KOR	1.3 km	MPC · JPL
311835	2006 VW_{25}	—	October 27, 2006	Kitt Peak	Spacewatch	·	2.4 km	MPC · JPL
311836	2006 VC_{26}	—	November 10, 2006	Kitt Peak	Spacewatch	·	1.6 km	MPC · JPL
311837	2006 VG_{44}	—	November 13, 2006	Catalina	CSS	·	2.6 km	MPC · JPL
311838	2006 VW_{47}	—	November 10, 2006	Kitt Peak	Spacewatch	·	1.5 km	MPC · JPL
311839	2006 VW_{52}	—	November 11, 2006	Kitt Peak	Spacewatch	·	3.6 km	MPC · JPL
311840	2006 VO_{56}	—	November 11, 2006	Kitt Peak	Spacewatch	·	2.4 km	MPC · JPL
311841	2006 VB_{64}	—	November 11, 2006	Kitt Peak	Spacewatch	·	2.4 km	MPC · JPL
311842	2006 VC_{69}	—	November 11, 2006	Catalina	CSS	CLO	2.4 km	MPC · JPL
311843	2006 VQ_{69}	—	November 11, 2006	Kitt Peak	Spacewatch	·	3.0 km	MPC · JPL
311844	2006 VE_{70}	—	November 11, 2006	Kitt Peak	Spacewatch	EUN	1.7 km	MPC · JPL
311845	2006 VY_{79}	—	November 12, 2006	Mount Lemmon	Mount Lemmon Survey	·	2.2 km	MPC · JPL
311846	2006 VA_{85}	—	November 13, 2006	Kitt Peak	Spacewatch	HOF	2.4 km	MPC · JPL
311847	2006 VU_{94}	—	November 15, 2006	Mount Lemmon	Mount Lemmon Survey	H	680 m	MPC · JPL
311848	2006 VN_{95}	—	November 13, 2006	Mount Lemmon	Mount Lemmon Survey	HOF	2.5 km	MPC · JPL
311849	2006 VU_{101}	—	November 12, 2006	Mount Lemmon	Mount Lemmon Survey	·	2.0 km	MPC · JPL
311850	2006 VU_{108}	—	November 13, 2006	Kitt Peak	Spacewatch	·	1.6 km	MPC · JPL
311851	2006 VG_{138}	—	November 15, 2006	Kitt Peak	Spacewatch	AGN	1.4 km	MPC · JPL
311852	2006 VU_{151}	—	November 9, 2006	Palomar	NEAT	·	3.5 km	MPC · JPL
311853	2006 VD_{153}	—	November 8, 2006	Palomar	NEAT	·	4.1 km	MPC · JPL
311854	2006 VS_{153}	—	November 8, 2006	Palomar	NEAT	NEM	2.6 km	MPC · JPL
311855	2006 WE_{7}	—	November 16, 2006	Kitt Peak	Spacewatch	·	2.2 km	MPC · JPL
311856	2006 WL_{8}	—	November 16, 2006	Kitt Peak	Spacewatch	WIT	1.1 km	MPC · JPL
311857	2006 WQ_{10}	—	November 16, 2006	Catalina	CSS	·	2.5 km	MPC · JPL
311858	2006 WD_{19}	—	November 17, 2006	Catalina	CSS	AGN	1.3 km	MPC · JPL
311859	2006 WB_{21}	—	November 17, 2006	Mount Lemmon	Mount Lemmon Survey	AEO	1.3 km	MPC · JPL
311860	2006 WJ_{26}	—	November 18, 2006	Kitt Peak	Spacewatch	·	2.6 km	MPC · JPL
311861	2006 WP_{30}	—	November 20, 2006	Kitt Peak	Spacewatch	·	1.5 km	MPC · JPL
311862	2006 WR_{38}	—	November 16, 2006	Kitt Peak	Spacewatch	·	2.2 km	MPC · JPL
311863	2006 WR_{39}	—	November 16, 2006	Kitt Peak	Spacewatch	KOR	1.4 km	MPC · JPL
311864	2006 WY_{44}	—	November 16, 2006	Catalina	CSS	AST	1.7 km	MPC · JPL
311865	2006 WZ_{69}	—	November 18, 2006	Kitt Peak	Spacewatch	MRX	1.2 km	MPC · JPL
311866	2006 WN_{71}	—	November 18, 2006	Kitt Peak	Spacewatch	·	1.6 km	MPC · JPL
311867	2006 WO_{71}	—	November 18, 2006	Kitt Peak	Spacewatch	PAD	1.7 km	MPC · JPL
311868	2006 WA_{79}	—	November 18, 2006	Kitt Peak	Spacewatch	·	2.2 km	MPC · JPL
311869	2006 WP_{90}	—	November 19, 2006	Kitt Peak	Spacewatch	·	2.0 km	MPC · JPL
311870	2006 WN_{95}	—	November 19, 2006	Kitt Peak	Spacewatch	·	2.9 km	MPC · JPL
311871	2006 WV_{95}	—	November 19, 2006	Kitt Peak	Spacewatch	PAD	2.0 km	MPC · JPL
311872	2006 WN_{98}	—	November 19, 2006	Kitt Peak	Spacewatch	AGN	1.4 km	MPC · JPL
311873	2006 WW_{98}	—	November 19, 2006	Kitt Peak	Spacewatch	·	2.4 km	MPC · JPL
311874	2006 WS_{109}	—	November 19, 2006	Kitt Peak	Spacewatch	KOR	1.3 km	MPC · JPL
311875	2006 WW_{131}	—	November 17, 2006	Mount Lemmon	Mount Lemmon Survey	·	2.1 km	MPC · JPL
311876	2006 WF_{135}	—	November 18, 2006	Socorro	LINEAR	·	2.9 km	MPC · JPL
311877	2006 WA_{137}	—	November 19, 2006	Catalina	CSS	·	2.4 km	MPC · JPL
311878	2006 WH_{143}	—	November 20, 2006	Kitt Peak	Spacewatch	(12739)	2.0 km	MPC · JPL
311879	2006 WS_{150}	—	November 20, 2006	Mount Lemmon	Mount Lemmon Survey	·	4.2 km	MPC · JPL
311880	2006 WH_{153}	—	November 21, 2006	Mount Lemmon	Mount Lemmon Survey	·	2.5 km	MPC · JPL
311881	2006 WK_{185}	—	November 18, 2006	Socorro	LINEAR	H	730 m	MPC · JPL
311882	2006 WK_{192}	—	November 27, 2006	Kitt Peak	Spacewatch	KOR	1.5 km	MPC · JPL
311883	2006 WH_{204}	—	November 23, 2006	Mount Lemmon	Mount Lemmon Survey	·	4.1 km	MPC · JPL
311884	2006 WB_{206}	—	November 22, 2006	Mount Lemmon	Mount Lemmon Survey	·	4.2 km	MPC · JPL
311885	2006 XH_{18}	—	December 10, 2006	Kitt Peak	Spacewatch	EOS ·	4.6 km	MPC · JPL
311886	2006 XF_{24}	—	December 12, 2006	Kitt Peak	Spacewatch	·	3.8 km	MPC · JPL
311887	2006 XD_{33}	—	December 11, 2006	Kitt Peak	Spacewatch	·	2.4 km	MPC · JPL
311888	2006 XO_{35}	—	September 28, 2005	Palomar	NEAT	·	3.6 km	MPC · JPL
311889	2006 XP_{35}	—	December 11, 2006	Kitt Peak	Spacewatch	·	2.8 km	MPC · JPL
311890	2006 XS_{42}	—	December 12, 2006	Mount Lemmon	Mount Lemmon Survey	EOS	2.5 km	MPC · JPL
311891	2006 XW_{50}	—	December 13, 2006	Mount Lemmon	Mount Lemmon Survey	·	3.9 km	MPC · JPL
311892	2006 XB_{55}	—	December 15, 2006	Socorro	LINEAR	·	4.0 km	MPC · JPL
311893	2006 XB_{58}	—	December 14, 2006	Kitt Peak	Spacewatch	·	4.3 km	MPC · JPL
311894	2006 XL_{70}	—	December 15, 2006	Kitt Peak	Spacewatch	EOS	3.5 km	MPC · JPL
311895	2006 YG_{5}	—	December 17, 2006	Mount Lemmon	Mount Lemmon Survey	·	1.8 km	MPC · JPL
311896	2006 YC_{9}	—	December 20, 2006	Mount Lemmon	Mount Lemmon Survey	·	2.1 km	MPC · JPL
311897	2006 YM_{19}	—	December 23, 2006	Mount Lemmon	Mount Lemmon Survey	·	4.6 km	MPC · JPL
311898	2006 YN_{23}	—	December 21, 2006	Kitt Peak	Spacewatch	KOR	1.3 km	MPC · JPL
311899	2006 YP_{43}	—	December 25, 2006	Kitt Peak	Spacewatch	·	1.9 km	MPC · JPL
311900	2006 YR_{46}	—	December 21, 2006	Mount Lemmon	Mount Lemmon Survey	·	4.6 km	MPC · JPL

== 311901–312000 ==
back to top

Designation			Discovery			Properties		Ref
Permanent	Provisional	Named after	Date	Site	Discoverer(s)	Category	Diam.	Ref
311901	2006 YM_{48}	—	December 24, 2006	Kitt Peak	Spacewatch	·	2.7 km	MPC · JPL
311902	2006 YY_{52}	—	December 27, 2006	Mount Lemmon	Mount Lemmon Survey	·	2.3 km	MPC · JPL
311903	2006 YP_{53}	—	December 24, 2006	Kitt Peak	Spacewatch	·	1.7 km	MPC · JPL
311904	2007 AD_{4}	—	January 8, 2007	Catalina	CSS	DOR	3.2 km	MPC · JPL
311905	2007 AQ_{7}	—	January 9, 2007	Mount Lemmon	Mount Lemmon Survey	·	4.0 km	MPC · JPL
311906	2007 AJ_{8}	—	January 10, 2007	Mount Nyukasa	Japan Aerospace Exploration Agency	·	1.6 km	MPC · JPL
311907	2007 AH_{9}	—	January 12, 2007	Vallemare Borbona	V. S. Casulli	·	3.5 km	MPC · JPL
311908	2007 AZ_{10}	—	January 9, 2007	Kitt Peak	Spacewatch	EUP	5.8 km	MPC · JPL
311909	2007 AN_{12}	—	January 9, 2007	Kitt Peak	Spacewatch	H	780 m	MPC · JPL
311910	2007 AB_{18}	—	January 8, 2007	Catalina	CSS	·	3.4 km	MPC · JPL
311911	2007 AU_{18}	—	January 10, 2007	Socorro	LINEAR	·	2.1 km	MPC · JPL
311912	2007 BF_{3}	—	January 16, 2007	Socorro	LINEAR	EOS	2.3 km	MPC · JPL
311913	2007 BY_{10}	—	January 17, 2007	Kitt Peak	Spacewatch	·	3.4 km	MPC · JPL
311914	2007 BW_{11}	—	January 17, 2007	Kitt Peak	Spacewatch	·	5.6 km	MPC · JPL
311915	2007 BJ_{17}	—	January 17, 2007	Palomar	NEAT	·	1.5 km	MPC · JPL
311916	2007 BE_{19}	—	January 21, 2007	Socorro	LINEAR	·	2.0 km	MPC · JPL
311917	2007 BX_{29}	—	January 24, 2007	Socorro	LINEAR	·	4.6 km	MPC · JPL
311918	2007 BJ_{30}	—	January 24, 2007	Catalina	CSS	EOS	2.3 km	MPC · JPL
311919	2007 BC_{32}	—	January 24, 2007	Mount Lemmon	Mount Lemmon Survey	EOS	2.5 km	MPC · JPL
311920	2007 BM_{32}	—	January 24, 2007	Mount Lemmon	Mount Lemmon Survey	EOS	2.0 km	MPC · JPL
311921	2007 BU_{36}	—	January 24, 2007	Catalina	CSS	·	5.4 km	MPC · JPL
311922	2007 BU_{45}	—	January 26, 2007	Kitt Peak	Spacewatch	·	3.6 km	MPC · JPL
311923	2007 BW_{46}	—	January 26, 2007	Kitt Peak	Spacewatch	·	1.6 km	MPC · JPL
311924	2007 BW_{58}	—	January 24, 2007	Catalina	CSS	·	4.4 km	MPC · JPL
311925	2007 BF_{72}	—	January 28, 2007	Kitt Peak	Spacewatch	AMO	400 m	MPC · JPL
311926	2007 BY_{72}	—	January 27, 2007	Farra d'Isonzo	Farra d'Isonzo	EOS	2.4 km	MPC · JPL
311927	2007 BC_{73}	—	January 23, 2007	Socorro	LINEAR	T_{j} (2.96)	3.6 km	MPC · JPL
311928	2007 BZ_{75}	—	January 28, 2007	Mount Lemmon	Mount Lemmon Survey	·	2.9 km	MPC · JPL
311929	2007 CH_{7}	—	February 6, 2007	Kitt Peak	Spacewatch	·	2.8 km	MPC · JPL
311930	2007 CL_{8}	—	January 17, 2007	Kitt Peak	Spacewatch	·	3.2 km	MPC · JPL
311931	2007 CT_{12}	—	February 6, 2007	Mount Lemmon	Mount Lemmon Survey	·	3.6 km	MPC · JPL
311932	2007 CD_{19}	—	February 8, 2007	7300	W. K. Y. Yeung	·	3.5 km	MPC · JPL
311933	2007 CN_{27}	—	February 5, 2007	Lulin	Lin, H.-C., Q. Ye	·	4.3 km	MPC · JPL
311934	2007 CE_{29}	—	February 6, 2007	Mount Lemmon	Mount Lemmon Survey	·	3.5 km	MPC · JPL
311935	2007 CU_{29}	—	February 6, 2007	Mount Lemmon	Mount Lemmon Survey	·	3.4 km	MPC · JPL
311936	2007 CN_{33}	—	February 6, 2007	Mount Lemmon	Mount Lemmon Survey	·	4.1 km	MPC · JPL
311937	2007 CF_{36}	—	February 6, 2007	Kitt Peak	Spacewatch	·	5.3 km	MPC · JPL
311938	2007 CH_{38}	—	February 6, 2007	Mount Lemmon	Mount Lemmon Survey	·	2.5 km	MPC · JPL
311939	2007 CE_{44}	—	February 8, 2007	Palomar	NEAT	·	2.5 km	MPC · JPL
311940	2007 CW_{45}	—	February 8, 2007	Palomar	NEAT	EOS	2.0 km	MPC · JPL
311941	2007 CK_{46}	—	February 8, 2007	Mount Lemmon	Mount Lemmon Survey	·	3.2 km	MPC · JPL
311942	2007 CG_{47}	—	February 8, 2007	Palomar	NEAT	·	4.2 km	MPC · JPL
311943	2007 CU_{48}	—	March 27, 1996	Kitt Peak	Spacewatch	·	4.0 km	MPC · JPL
311944	2007 CF_{58}	—	February 9, 2007	Catalina	CSS	TIR	3.7 km	MPC · JPL
311945	2007 CF_{59}	—	February 10, 2007	Catalina	CSS	URS	5.9 km	MPC · JPL
311946	2007 CR_{61}	—	February 15, 2007	Marly	P. Kocher	H	720 m	MPC · JPL
311947	2007 CE_{62}	—	February 10, 2007	Catalina	CSS	·	1.8 km	MPC · JPL
311948	2007 CP_{79}	—	February 9, 2007	Kitt Peak	Spacewatch	·	2.6 km	MPC · JPL
311949	2007 DE	—	February 16, 2007	Mayhill	Lowe, A.	·	2.8 km	MPC · JPL
311950	2007 DN	—	February 16, 2007	Wildberg	R. Apitzsch	·	2.9 km	MPC · JPL
311951	2007 DY_{6}	—	February 16, 2007	Catalina	CSS	H	830 m	MPC · JPL
311952	2007 DX_{12}	—	February 16, 2007	Palomar	NEAT	·	3.9 km	MPC · JPL
311953	2007 DQ_{13}	—	February 17, 2007	Kitt Peak	Spacewatch	·	2.7 km	MPC · JPL
311954	2007 DO_{18}	—	February 17, 2007	Kitt Peak	Spacewatch	·	3.0 km	MPC · JPL
311955	2007 DT_{28}	—	February 17, 2007	Kitt Peak	Spacewatch	·	4.0 km	MPC · JPL
311956	2007 DN_{34}	—	February 17, 2007	Kitt Peak	Spacewatch	·	3.7 km	MPC · JPL
311957 Barryalbright	2007 DQ_{42}	Barryalbright	February 17, 2007	Mount Lemmon	Mount Lemmon Survey	·	1.9 km	MPC · JPL
311958	2007 DD_{47}	—	February 21, 2007	Mount Lemmon	Mount Lemmon Survey	·	3.4 km	MPC · JPL
311959	2007 DE_{54}	—	February 21, 2007	Kitt Peak	Spacewatch	·	2.1 km	MPC · JPL
311960	2007 DC_{59}	—	February 22, 2007	Kitt Peak	Spacewatch	EOS	3.9 km	MPC · JPL
311961	2007 DK_{61}	—	February 19, 2007	Catalina	CSS	H	770 m	MPC · JPL
311962	2007 DT_{70}	—	February 21, 2007	Kitt Peak	Spacewatch	·	2.3 km	MPC · JPL
311963	2007 DC_{77}	—	February 22, 2007	Anderson Mesa	LONEOS	·	2.2 km	MPC · JPL
311964	2007 DJ_{89}	—	February 23, 2007	Kitt Peak	Spacewatch	·	3.4 km	MPC · JPL
311965	2007 DP_{89}	—	February 23, 2007	Mount Lemmon	Mount Lemmon Survey	·	3.3 km	MPC · JPL
311966	2007 DG_{97}	—	February 23, 2007	Catalina	CSS	TIR	3.2 km	MPC · JPL
311967	2007 EB	—	March 1, 2007	Siding Spring	SSS	·	3.8 km	MPC · JPL
311968	2007 EQ_{6}	—	March 9, 2007	Mount Lemmon	Mount Lemmon Survey	·	3.2 km	MPC · JPL
311969	2007 ED_{19}	—	March 10, 2007	Kitt Peak	Spacewatch	H	470 m	MPC · JPL
311970	2007 EL_{35}	—	March 11, 2007	Kitt Peak	Spacewatch	HYG	4.6 km	MPC · JPL
311971	2007 EF_{39}	—	March 11, 2007	Črni Vrh	Skvarč, J.	·	4.8 km	MPC · JPL
311972	2007 EU_{44}	—	March 9, 2007	Mount Lemmon	Mount Lemmon Survey	·	1.8 km	MPC · JPL
311973	2007 EF_{52}	—	March 11, 2007	Catalina	CSS	LIX	4.5 km	MPC · JPL
311974	2007 EY_{56}	—	March 14, 2007	Mayhill	Lowe, A.	·	5.6 km	MPC · JPL
311975	2007 EL_{58}	—	March 9, 2007	Mount Lemmon	Mount Lemmon Survey	·	2.4 km	MPC · JPL
311976	2007 ED_{60}	—	March 9, 2007	Mount Lemmon	Mount Lemmon Survey	HYG	4.2 km	MPC · JPL
311977	2007 EV_{82}	—	March 12, 2007	Kitt Peak	Spacewatch	·	3.7 km	MPC · JPL
311978	2007 ET_{85}	—	March 12, 2007	Catalina	CSS	EOS	3.0 km	MPC · JPL
311979	2007 EC_{92}	—	March 10, 2007	Kitt Peak	Spacewatch	·	2.8 km	MPC · JPL
311980	2007 EV_{192}	—	March 14, 2007	Catalina	CSS	·	5.1 km	MPC · JPL
311981	2007 EO_{199}	—	March 10, 2007	Kitt Peak	Spacewatch	·	4.0 km	MPC · JPL
311982	2007 ES_{200}	—	March 15, 2007	Catalina	CSS	EOS	3.2 km	MPC · JPL
311983	2007 EK_{201}	—	March 10, 2007	Siding Spring	SSS	·	5.6 km	MPC · JPL
311984	2007 EL_{211}	—	March 8, 2007	Palomar	NEAT	HYG	3.7 km	MPC · JPL
311985	2007 EQ_{222}	—	March 11, 2007	Catalina	CSS	·	5.3 km	MPC · JPL
311986	2007 FV_{16}	—	March 20, 2007	Mount Lemmon	Mount Lemmon Survey	·	2.8 km	MPC · JPL
311987	2007 FJ_{38}	—	March 29, 2007	Palomar	NEAT	H	720 m	MPC · JPL
311988	2007 GP_{4}	—	April 10, 2007	Purple Mountain	PMO NEO Survey Program	EUP	9.1 km	MPC · JPL
311989	2007 GL_{12}	—	April 11, 2007	Mount Lemmon	Mount Lemmon Survey	TIR	3.3 km	MPC · JPL
311990	2007 GD_{32}	—	April 11, 2007	Catalina	CSS	·	6.6 km	MPC · JPL
311991	2007 HH_{5}	—	April 20, 2007	Sandlot	G. Hug	H	720 m	MPC · JPL
311992	2007 HH_{89}	—	April 11, 2007	Kitt Peak	Spacewatch	·	4.0 km	MPC · JPL
311993	2007 KK_{2}	—	May 20, 2007	Catalina	CSS	H	630 m	MPC · JPL
311994	2007 KN_{9}	—	May 20, 2007	Siding Spring	SSS	·	7.3 km	MPC · JPL
311995	2007 LT_{1}	—	June 7, 2007	Kitt Peak	Spacewatch	·	3.8 km	MPC · JPL
311996	2007 LS_{12}	—	June 9, 2007	Catalina	CSS	H	930 m	MPC · JPL
311997	2007 MW_{2}	—	June 16, 2007	Kitt Peak	Spacewatch	L4	10 km	MPC · JPL
311998	2007 MQ_{3}	—	June 17, 2007	Kitt Peak	Spacewatch	·	1.8 km	MPC · JPL
311999	2007 NS_{2}	—	July 14, 2007	La Sagra	OAM	·	710 m	MPC · JPL
312000	2007 OB_{4}	—	July 21, 2007	Charleston	Astronomical Research Observatory	·	920 m	MPC · JPL

back to top

== See also ==
- Meanings of minor-planet names: 311001–312000
