= Meanings of minor-planet names: 349001–350000 =

As minor planet discoveries are confirmed, they are given a permanent number by the IAU's Minor Planet Center (MPC), and the discoverers can then submit names for them, following the IAU's naming conventions. The list below concerns those minor planets in the specified number-range that have received names, and explains the meanings of those names.

Official naming citations of newly named small Solar System bodies are approved and published in a bulletin by IAU's Working Group for Small Bodies Nomenclature (WGSBN). Before May 2021, citations were published in MPC's Minor Planet Circulars for many decades. Recent citations can also be found on the JPL Small-Body Database (SBDB). Until his death in 2016, German astronomer Lutz D. Schmadel compiled these citations into the Dictionary of Minor Planet Names (DMP) and regularly updated the collection.

Based on Paul Herget's The Names of the Minor Planets, Schmadel also researched the unclear origin of numerous asteroids, most of which had been named prior to World War II. This article incorporates text from this source, which is in the public domain: SBDB New namings may only be added to this list below after official publication as the preannouncement of names is condemned. The WGSBN publishes a comprehensive guideline for the naming rules of non-cometary small Solar System bodies.

== 349001–349100 ==
Named minor planet	Provisional	This minor planet was named for...	Ref · Catalog
There are no named minor planets in this number range

== 349101–349200 ==
back to top

Named minor planet	Provisional	This minor planet was named for...	Ref · Catalog
There are no named minor planets in this number range

== 349201–349300 ==
back to top

Named minor planet	Provisional	This minor planet was named for...	Ref · Catalog
349237 Quaglietti	2007 TH_{69}	Luciano Quaglietti (born 1952) is an Italian amateur astronomer and seeker of meteorites.	IAU · 349237

== 349301–349400 ==
back to top

Named minor planet	Provisional	This minor planet was named for...	Ref · Catalog
349386 Randywright	2007 WA_{56}	Randall P. Wright (born 1948), executive vice-president and chief operating officer at Texas Children's Hospital, holder of a BS in Physics from Eastern Illinois University.	JPL · 349386

== 349401–349500 ==
back to top

Named minor planet	Provisional	This minor planet was named for...	Ref · Catalog
349407 Stefaniafoglia	2007 YY_{29}	Stefania Foglia (born 1971), sister of Italian amateur astronomer Sergio Foglia at Suno Observatory, where this minor planet was discovered.	IAU · 349407
349499 Dechirico	2008 OX_{5}	Giorgio de Chirico (1888–1978) was an Italian painter and writer, who founded the metaphysical art movement (Italian: Scuola metafisica), deeply influencing surrealism.	IAU · 349499

== 349501–349600 ==
back to top

Named minor planet	Provisional	This minor planet was named for...	Ref · Catalog
There are no named minor planets in this number range

== 349601–349700 ==
back to top

Named minor planet	Provisional	This minor planet was named for...	Ref · Catalog
349606 Fleurance	2008 UX_{5}	Fleurance is a once fortified city in Gers, in south-western France.	JPL · 349606

== 349701–349800 ==
back to top

Named minor planet	Provisional	This minor planet was named for...	Ref · Catalog
349785 Hsiaotejen	2009 BP_{55}	Hsiao Te-Jen (1934–2015), grandfather of Taiwanese co-discoverer Xiangyao Hsiao	JPL · 349785

== 349801–349900 ==
back to top

Named minor planet	Provisional	This minor planet was named for...	Ref · Catalog
349862 Modigliani	2009 DX_{43}	Amedeo Modigliani (1884–1920) was an Italian painter and sculptor, known for his modern-style nudes and portraits with surreal long faces and necks.	IAU · 349862

== 349901–350000 ==
back to top

Named minor planet	Provisional	This minor planet was named for...	Ref · Catalog
There are no named minor planets in this number range

back to top

Preceded by 348,001–349,000	Meanings of minor-planet names List of minor planets: 349,001–350,000	Succeeded by 350,001–351,000
