= List of minor planets: 349001–350000 =

The following is a partial list of minor planets, running from minor-planet number 349001 through 350000, inclusive. The primary data for this and other partial lists is based on JPL's "Small-Body Orbital Elements" and data available from the Minor Planet Center. Critical list information is also provided by the MPC, unless otherwise specified from Lowell Observatory. A detailed description of the table's columns and additional sources are given on the main page including a complete list of every page in this series, and a statistical break-up on the dynamical classification of minor planets.

Also see the summary list of all named bodies in numerical and alphabetical order, and the corresponding naming citations for the number range of this particular list. New namings may only be added to this list after official publication, as the preannouncement of names is condemned by the Working Group for Small Bodies Nomenclature of the International Astronomical Union.

Near-Earth obj.	MBA (inner)	MBA (outer)	Centaur
Mars-crosser	MBA (middle)	Jupiter trojan	Trans-Neptunian obj.
Unclassified

== 349001–349100 ==
Designation			Discovery			Properties		Ref
Permanent	Provisional	Named after	Date	Site	Discoverer(s)	Category	Diam.	Ref
349001	2006 UT_{246}	—	October 27, 2006	Mount Lemmon	Mount Lemmon Survey	·	3.2 km	MPC · JPL
349002	2006 UY_{249}	—	October 27, 2006	Mount Lemmon	Mount Lemmon Survey	THM	2.3 km	MPC · JPL
349003	2006 UW_{267}	—	October 27, 2006	Catalina	CSS	·	4.6 km	MPC · JPL
349004	2006 UU_{268}	—	October 27, 2006	Mount Lemmon	Mount Lemmon Survey	·	3.1 km	MPC · JPL
349005	2006 UT_{270}	—	October 27, 2006	Mount Lemmon	Mount Lemmon Survey	EOS	2.0 km	MPC · JPL
349006	2006 UZ_{273}	—	October 27, 2006	Kitt Peak	Spacewatch	·	1.4 km	MPC · JPL
349007	2006 UA_{274}	—	October 27, 2006	Kitt Peak	Spacewatch	·	3.4 km	MPC · JPL
349008	2006 UJ_{274}	—	October 27, 2006	Kitt Peak	Spacewatch	THB · slow	4.2 km	MPC · JPL
349009	2006 UK_{274}	—	October 27, 2006	Kitt Peak	Spacewatch	·	1.5 km	MPC · JPL
349010	2006 UO_{275}	—	October 28, 2006	Calvin-Rehoboth	L. A. Molnar	·	2.0 km	MPC · JPL
349011	2006 UP_{277}	—	October 2, 2006	Mount Lemmon	Mount Lemmon Survey	·	2.8 km	MPC · JPL
349012	2006 UG_{282}	—	October 28, 2006	Mount Lemmon	Mount Lemmon Survey	·	3.0 km	MPC · JPL
349013	2006 UM_{285}	—	October 28, 2006	Kitt Peak	Spacewatch	MAS	760 m	MPC · JPL
349014	2006 UC_{288}	—	October 29, 2006	Kitt Peak	Spacewatch	·	3.6 km	MPC · JPL
349015	2006 UF_{289}	—	October 14, 2006	Lulin	LUSS	·	3.3 km	MPC · JPL
349016	2006 UV_{289}	—	October 31, 2006	Kitt Peak	Spacewatch	·	3.6 km	MPC · JPL
349017	2006 UA_{331}	—	October 16, 2006	Apache Point	A. C. Becker	·	3.6 km	MPC · JPL
349018	2006 UD_{352}	—	October 26, 2006	Mauna Kea	P. A. Wiegert	·	2.7 km	MPC · JPL
349019	2006 UE_{358}	—	October 21, 2006	Mount Lemmon	Mount Lemmon Survey	·	2.0 km	MPC · JPL
349020	2006 UJ_{361}	—	October 21, 2006	Catalina	CSS	·	4.6 km	MPC · JPL
349021	2006 VB_{7}	—	November 10, 2006	Kitt Peak	Spacewatch	THM	2.6 km	MPC · JPL
349022	2006 VE_{9}	—	November 11, 2006	Catalina	CSS	·	3.4 km	MPC · JPL
349023	2006 VD_{11}	—	November 11, 2006	Mount Lemmon	Mount Lemmon Survey	·	4.9 km	MPC · JPL
349024	2006 VC_{13}	—	November 1, 2006	Catalina	CSS	EUP	7.9 km	MPC · JPL
349025	2006 VP_{16}	—	November 9, 2006	Kitt Peak	Spacewatch	·	2.9 km	MPC · JPL
349026	2006 VU_{17}	—	November 9, 2006	Kitt Peak	Spacewatch	VER	2.8 km	MPC · JPL
349027	2006 VG_{22}	—	November 10, 2006	Kitt Peak	Spacewatch	·	3.0 km	MPC · JPL
349028	2006 VH_{24}	—	November 10, 2006	Kitt Peak	Spacewatch	THM	2.4 km	MPC · JPL
349029	2006 VN_{31}	—	September 26, 2006	Mount Lemmon	Mount Lemmon Survey	·	3.3 km	MPC · JPL
349030	2006 VA_{32}	—	November 11, 2006	Mount Lemmon	Mount Lemmon Survey	·	2.8 km	MPC · JPL
349031	2006 VR_{36}	—	October 16, 2006	Catalina	CSS	·	2.0 km	MPC · JPL
349032	2006 VU_{37}	—	November 11, 2006	Palomar	NEAT	·	4.0 km	MPC · JPL
349033	2006 VT_{42}	—	November 12, 2006	Mount Lemmon	Mount Lemmon Survey	·	3.7 km	MPC · JPL
349034	2006 VW_{48}	—	November 10, 2006	Kitt Peak	Spacewatch	·	3.4 km	MPC · JPL
349035	2006 VD_{49}	—	November 10, 2006	Kitt Peak	Spacewatch	·	2.9 km	MPC · JPL
349036	2006 VD_{54}	—	October 31, 2006	Kitt Peak	Spacewatch	(5)	930 m	MPC · JPL
349037	2006 VA_{62}	—	November 11, 2006	Kitt Peak	Spacewatch	KON	2.5 km	MPC · JPL
349038	2006 VS_{62}	—	November 11, 2006	Kitt Peak	Spacewatch	THM	2.0 km	MPC · JPL
349039	2006 VS_{65}	—	November 11, 2006	Kitt Peak	Spacewatch	·	2.1 km	MPC · JPL
349040	2006 VM_{74}	—	November 11, 2006	Mount Lemmon	Mount Lemmon Survey	EUN	2.2 km	MPC · JPL
349041	2006 VF_{84}	—	November 13, 2006	Mount Lemmon	Mount Lemmon Survey	·	2.8 km	MPC · JPL
349042	2006 VN_{85}	—	October 21, 2006	Kitt Peak	Spacewatch	·	3.4 km	MPC · JPL
349043	2006 VK_{101}	—	November 11, 2006	Kitt Peak	Spacewatch	·	4.5 km	MPC · JPL
349044	2006 VC_{122}	—	November 14, 2006	Junk Bond	D. Healy	·	3.1 km	MPC · JPL
349045	2006 VK_{126}	—	September 25, 2006	Kitt Peak	Spacewatch	·	2.9 km	MPC · JPL
349046	2006 VD_{134}	—	November 15, 2006	Mount Lemmon	Mount Lemmon Survey	·	4.0 km	MPC · JPL
349047	2006 VJ_{142}	—	November 14, 2006	Kitt Peak	Spacewatch	·	4.5 km	MPC · JPL
349048	2006 VQ_{149}	—	November 9, 2006	Palomar	NEAT	·	3.2 km	MPC · JPL
349049	2006 VC_{170}	—	November 11, 2006	Kitt Peak	Spacewatch	·	3.5 km	MPC · JPL
349050	2006 VH_{171}	—	November 11, 2006	Kitt Peak	Spacewatch	VER	3.2 km	MPC · JPL
349051	2006 WQ_{2}	—	November 19, 2006	Needville	J. Dellinger	T_{j} (2.98) · EUP	4.0 km	MPC · JPL
349052	2006 WA_{11}	—	November 16, 2006	Socorro	LINEAR	·	2.9 km	MPC · JPL
349053	2006 WB_{40}	—	November 16, 2006	Kitt Peak	Spacewatch	·	3.8 km	MPC · JPL
349054	2006 WD_{52}	—	November 1, 2006	Mount Lemmon	Mount Lemmon Survey	·	1.4 km	MPC · JPL
349055	2006 WK_{78}	—	November 18, 2006	Kitt Peak	Spacewatch	·	3.5 km	MPC · JPL
349056	2006 WR_{83}	—	November 18, 2006	Kitt Peak	Spacewatch	·	3.1 km	MPC · JPL
349057	2006 WL_{107}	—	November 19, 2006	Catalina	CSS	·	2.8 km	MPC · JPL
349058	2006 WX_{133}	—	November 18, 2006	Mount Lemmon	Mount Lemmon Survey	·	2.5 km	MPC · JPL
349059	2006 WQ_{142}	—	November 20, 2006	Kitt Peak	Spacewatch	·	2.1 km	MPC · JPL
349060	2006 WQ_{156}	—	November 22, 2006	Mount Lemmon	Mount Lemmon Survey	·	3.2 km	MPC · JPL
349061	2006 WR_{177}	—	November 23, 2006	Mount Lemmon	Mount Lemmon Survey	·	3.0 km	MPC · JPL
349062	2006 WN_{191}	—	November 27, 2006	Kitt Peak	Spacewatch	THM	2.7 km	MPC · JPL
349063	2006 XA	—	December 1, 2006	Catalina	CSS	APO +1km	1.1 km	MPC · JPL
349064	2006 XQ_{6}	—	December 9, 2006	Palomar	NEAT	(5)	2.1 km	MPC · JPL
349065	2006 XC_{11}	—	December 10, 2006	Kitt Peak	Spacewatch	·	2.4 km	MPC · JPL
349066	2006 XF_{18}	—	September 28, 2006	Kitt Peak	Spacewatch	·	1.3 km	MPC · JPL
349067	2006 XS_{63}	—	December 9, 2006	Palomar	NEAT	·	2.7 km	MPC · JPL
349068	2006 YT_{13}	—	December 26, 2006	Catalina	CSS	APO · PHA	500 m	MPC · JPL
349069	2006 YX_{19}	—	December 25, 2006	Piszkéstető	K. Sárneczky	·	3.0 km	MPC · JPL
349070	2007 AW_{9}	—	December 15, 2006	Kitt Peak	Spacewatch	GEF	2.0 km	MPC · JPL
349071	2007 AU_{19}	—	January 8, 2007	Kitt Peak	Spacewatch	·	1.3 km	MPC · JPL
349072	2007 AN_{26}	—	January 9, 2007	Mount Lemmon	Mount Lemmon Survey	PHO	1.4 km	MPC · JPL
349073	2007 AQ_{27}	—	January 9, 2007	Kitt Peak	Spacewatch	·	970 m	MPC · JPL
349074	2007 BM_{8}	—	January 25, 2007	Anderson Mesa	LONEOS	APO +1km	1.1 km	MPC · JPL
349075	2007 BJ_{46}	—	January 26, 2007	Kitt Peak	Spacewatch	·	840 m	MPC · JPL
349076	2007 BJ_{67}	—	January 27, 2007	Mount Lemmon	Mount Lemmon Survey	·	780 m	MPC · JPL
349077	2007 BZ_{100}	—	January 27, 2007	Kitt Peak	Spacewatch	·	1.8 km	MPC · JPL
349078	2007 CT_{14}	—	February 7, 2007	Mount Lemmon	Mount Lemmon Survey	·	830 m	MPC · JPL
349079	2007 CP_{24}	—	February 8, 2007	Mount Lemmon	Mount Lemmon Survey	·	1.4 km	MPC · JPL
349080	2007 CL_{49}	—	February 10, 2007	Mount Lemmon	Mount Lemmon Survey	·	650 m	MPC · JPL
349081	2007 CB_{55}	—	February 10, 2007	Mount Lemmon	Mount Lemmon Survey	·	5.0 km	MPC · JPL
349082	2007 DR_{3}	—	September 30, 2005	Kitt Peak	Spacewatch	·	880 m	MPC · JPL
349083	2007 DT_{8}	—	February 17, 2007	Kitt Peak	Spacewatch	·	1.8 km	MPC · JPL
349084	2007 DO_{9}	—	February 17, 2007	Kitt Peak	Spacewatch	·	1.8 km	MPC · JPL
349085	2007 DK_{35}	—	February 17, 2007	Kitt Peak	Spacewatch	·	740 m	MPC · JPL
349086	2007 DX_{52}	—	February 19, 2007	Mount Lemmon	Mount Lemmon Survey	·	3.3 km	MPC · JPL
349087	2007 DD_{53}	—	February 19, 2007	Mount Lemmon	Mount Lemmon Survey	·	950 m	MPC · JPL
349088	2007 DK_{67}	—	September 12, 2001	Socorro	LINEAR	·	1 km	MPC · JPL
349089	2007 DZ_{89}	—	January 27, 2007	Mount Lemmon	Mount Lemmon Survey	NYS	1.3 km	MPC · JPL
349090	2007 DO_{95}	—	February 23, 2007	Kitt Peak	Spacewatch	·	690 m	MPC · JPL
349091	2007 ED_{48}	—	March 9, 2007	Kitt Peak	Spacewatch	(2076)	1.0 km	MPC · JPL
349092	2007 ER_{64}	—	March 10, 2007	Kitt Peak	Spacewatch	·	2.4 km	MPC · JPL
349093	2007 EG_{67}	—	March 10, 2007	Kitt Peak	Spacewatch	·	780 m	MPC · JPL
349094	2007 EM_{73}	—	March 10, 2007	Mount Lemmon	Mount Lemmon Survey	·	760 m	MPC · JPL
349095	2007 ET_{78}	—	March 10, 2007	Palomar	NEAT	·	5.4 km	MPC · JPL
349096	2007 ED_{102}	—	March 11, 2007	Kitt Peak	Spacewatch	·	1.5 km	MPC · JPL
349097	2007 ET_{154}	—	January 2, 2000	Kitt Peak	Spacewatch	·	2.0 km	MPC · JPL
349098	2007 EN_{175}	—	March 14, 2007	Kitt Peak	Spacewatch	·	950 m	MPC · JPL
349099	2007 ES_{212}	—	March 8, 2007	Palomar	NEAT	·	840 m	MPC · JPL
349100	2007 EQ_{220}	—	August 30, 2005	Kitt Peak	Spacewatch	·	700 m	MPC · JPL

== 349101–349200 ==
back to top

Designation			Discovery			Properties		Ref
Permanent	Provisional	Named after	Date	Site	Discoverer(s)	Category	Diam.	Ref
349101	2007 EN_{221}	—	March 15, 2007	Mount Lemmon	Mount Lemmon Survey	V	800 m	MPC · JPL
349102	2007 FN_{12}	—	March 18, 2007	Kitt Peak	Spacewatch	V	740 m	MPC · JPL
349103	2007 FH_{31}	—	March 20, 2007	Mount Lemmon	Mount Lemmon Survey	(2076)	940 m	MPC · JPL
349104	2007 FH_{33}	—	March 9, 2007	Kitt Peak	Spacewatch	·	900 m	MPC · JPL
349105	2007 GQ_{8}	—	April 7, 2007	Mount Lemmon	Mount Lemmon Survey	·	700 m	MPC · JPL
349106	2007 GT_{13}	—	April 11, 2007	Kitt Peak	Spacewatch	·	720 m	MPC · JPL
349107	2007 GA_{18}	—	April 11, 2007	Kitt Peak	Spacewatch	·	2.3 km	MPC · JPL
349108	2007 GD_{18}	—	April 11, 2007	Kitt Peak	Spacewatch	·	690 m	MPC · JPL
349109	2007 GQ_{19}	—	April 11, 2007	Kitt Peak	Spacewatch	V	840 m	MPC · JPL
349110	2007 GW_{23}	—	April 11, 2007	Kitt Peak	Spacewatch	NYS	1.5 km	MPC · JPL
349111	2007 GH_{24}	—	April 11, 2007	Kitt Peak	Spacewatch	MAS	870 m	MPC · JPL
349112	2007 GJ_{24}	—	April 11, 2007	Kitt Peak	Spacewatch	NYS	1.1 km	MPC · JPL
349113	2007 GL_{25}	—	April 13, 2007	Siding Spring	SSS	PHO	1.4 km	MPC · JPL
349114	2007 GT_{35}	—	March 13, 2007	Mount Lemmon	Mount Lemmon Survey	·	1.5 km	MPC · JPL
349115	2007 GR_{36}	—	April 14, 2007	Kitt Peak	Spacewatch	MAS	860 m	MPC · JPL
349116	2007 GS_{37}	—	April 25, 2000	Kitt Peak	Spacewatch	·	690 m	MPC · JPL
349117	2007 GC_{71}	—	April 15, 2007	Mount Lemmon	Mount Lemmon Survey	·	560 m	MPC · JPL
349118	2007 GK_{74}	—	March 14, 2007	Siding Spring	SSS	·	2.1 km	MPC · JPL
349119	2007 HN_{2}	—	April 16, 2007	Mount Lemmon	Mount Lemmon Survey	·	620 m	MPC · JPL
349120	2007 HS_{8}	—	April 18, 2007	Mount Lemmon	Mount Lemmon Survey	·	640 m	MPC · JPL
349121	2007 HB_{11}	—	April 18, 2007	Kitt Peak	Spacewatch	·	1.2 km	MPC · JPL
349122	2007 HJ_{20}	—	April 18, 2007	Kitt Peak	Spacewatch	MAS	780 m	MPC · JPL
349123	2007 HS_{22}	—	November 21, 2005	Kitt Peak	Spacewatch	V	620 m	MPC · JPL
349124	2007 HW_{23}	—	April 18, 2007	Kitt Peak	Spacewatch	·	940 m	MPC · JPL
349125	2007 HZ_{40}	—	April 20, 2007	Kitt Peak	Spacewatch	·	1.1 km	MPC · JPL
349126	2007 HE_{50}	—	April 20, 2007	Kitt Peak	Spacewatch	·	660 m	MPC · JPL
349127	2007 HA_{67}	—	April 22, 2007	Mount Lemmon	Mount Lemmon Survey	BAR	1.8 km	MPC · JPL
349128	2007 HF_{71}	—	March 15, 2007	Mount Lemmon	Mount Lemmon Survey	·	1.7 km	MPC · JPL
349129	2007 HH_{72}	—	April 22, 2007	Kitt Peak	Spacewatch	·	1.0 km	MPC · JPL
349130	2007 HM_{73}	—	April 22, 2007	Kitt Peak	Spacewatch	EOS	2.2 km	MPC · JPL
349131	2007 HR_{80}	—	April 25, 2007	Mount Lemmon	Mount Lemmon Survey	·	670 m	MPC · JPL
349132	2007 HW_{81}	—	April 25, 2007	Kitt Peak	Spacewatch	V	590 m	MPC · JPL
349133	2007 JB	—	January 25, 2007	Siding Spring	SSS	BAR	2.4 km	MPC · JPL
349134	2007 JN_{1}	—	May 7, 2007	Kitt Peak	Spacewatch	MAS	770 m	MPC · JPL
349135	2007 JT_{14}	—	May 10, 2007	Mount Lemmon	Mount Lemmon Survey	·	630 m	MPC · JPL
349136	2007 JH_{17}	—	May 7, 2007	Kitt Peak	Spacewatch	·	1.4 km	MPC · JPL
349137	2007 JS_{24}	—	April 25, 2007	Mount Lemmon	Mount Lemmon Survey	EUN	1.1 km	MPC · JPL
349138	2007 JT_{27}	—	May 10, 2007	Anderson Mesa	LONEOS	·	1.9 km	MPC · JPL
349139	2007 JX_{30}	—	May 11, 2007	Mount Lemmon	Mount Lemmon Survey	·	910 m	MPC · JPL
349140	2007 JD_{34}	—	May 9, 2007	Catalina	CSS	·	1.8 km	MPC · JPL
349141	2007 KX_{6}	—	May 26, 2007	Siding Spring	SSS	PHO	1.7 km	MPC · JPL
349142	2007 KO_{9}	—	May 26, 2007	Mount Lemmon	Mount Lemmon Survey	fast	1.7 km	MPC · JPL
349143	2007 LC_{1}	—	June 8, 2007	Kitt Peak	Spacewatch	V	600 m	MPC · JPL
349144	2007 LL_{7}	—	June 8, 2007	Kitt Peak	Spacewatch	·	1.3 km	MPC · JPL
349145	2007 LP_{25}	—	January 27, 2001	Haleakala	NEAT	RAF	1.1 km	MPC · JPL
349146	2007 MC_{3}	—	June 16, 2007	Kitt Peak	Spacewatch	·	1.2 km	MPC · JPL
349147	2007 MU_{10}	—	June 21, 2007	Mount Lemmon	Mount Lemmon Survey	·	980 m	MPC · JPL
349148	2007 ML_{12}	—	June 21, 2007	Mount Lemmon	Mount Lemmon Survey	·	1.3 km	MPC · JPL
349149	2007 NY_{1}	—	July 13, 2007	La Sagra	OAM	PHO	1.5 km	MPC · JPL
349150	2007 NY_{5}	—	July 10, 2007	Siding Spring	SSS	·	2.1 km	MPC · JPL
349151	2007 NH_{6}	—	July 10, 2007	Siding Spring	SSS	·	1.7 km	MPC · JPL
349152	2007 OM_{2}	—	July 19, 2007	Tiki	S. F. Hönig, Teamo, N.	·	1.5 km	MPC · JPL
349153	2007 OS_{2}	—	July 20, 2007	Tiki	S. F. Hönig, Teamo, N.	EUN	1.5 km	MPC · JPL
349154	2007 OF_{6}	—	July 22, 2007	Lulin	LUSS	·	1.6 km	MPC · JPL
349155	2007 PS_{5}	—	August 6, 2007	Lulin	LUSS	MAR	1.4 km	MPC · JPL
349156	2007 PV_{9}	—	August 9, 2007	Socorro	LINEAR	EUN	1.3 km	MPC · JPL
349157	2007 PJ_{12}	—	August 5, 2007	Socorro	LINEAR	PHO	1.5 km	MPC · JPL
349158	2007 PS_{16}	—	August 8, 2007	Socorro	LINEAR	·	2.5 km	MPC · JPL
349159	2007 PA_{28}	—	August 14, 2007	Tiki	S. F. Hönig, Teamo, N.	·	1.5 km	MPC · JPL
349160	2007 PB_{29}	—	August 15, 2007	Hibiscus	S. F. Hönig, Teamo, N.	·	2.1 km	MPC · JPL
349161	2007 PN_{37}	—	August 13, 2007	Socorro	LINEAR	·	2.4 km	MPC · JPL
349162	2007 PX_{37}	—	August 13, 2007	Socorro	LINEAR	EUN	1.4 km	MPC · JPL
349163	2007 PA_{40}	—	August 15, 2007	Siding Spring	SSS	·	1.3 km	MPC · JPL
349164	2007 PL_{40}	—	August 13, 2007	Socorro	LINEAR	·	1.9 km	MPC · JPL
349165	2007 PT_{44}	—	August 8, 2007	Socorro	LINEAR	·	2.7 km	MPC · JPL
349166	2007 PP_{50}	—	August 10, 2007	Kitt Peak	Spacewatch	·	1.7 km	MPC · JPL
349167	2007 QB_{6}	—	September 18, 2003	Kitt Peak	Spacewatch	·	1.4 km	MPC · JPL
349168	2007 QW_{12}	—	August 23, 2007	Kitt Peak	Spacewatch	AGN	1.2 km	MPC · JPL
349169	2007 QY_{16}	—	August 16, 2007	Socorro	LINEAR	·	4.1 km	MPC · JPL
349170	2007 RT_{7}	—	September 5, 2007	Costitx	OAM	AEO	1.4 km	MPC · JPL
349171	2007 RG_{8}	—	September 5, 2007	Marly	P. Kocher	·	1.7 km	MPC · JPL
349172	2007 RX_{22}	—	September 3, 2007	Catalina	CSS	·	3.2 km	MPC · JPL
349173	2007 RT_{38}	—	September 8, 2007	Anderson Mesa	LONEOS	EUN	1.6 km	MPC · JPL
349174	2007 RV_{56}	—	September 9, 2007	Kitt Peak	Spacewatch	·	2.1 km	MPC · JPL
349175	2007 RB_{57}	—	September 9, 2007	Kitt Peak	Spacewatch	·	1.7 km	MPC · JPL
349176	2007 RD_{67}	—	September 27, 2003	Kitt Peak	Spacewatch	·	1.5 km	MPC · JPL
349177	2007 RU_{71}	—	September 10, 2007	Kitt Peak	Spacewatch	·	1.2 km	MPC · JPL
349178	2007 RX_{74}	—	September 10, 2007	Mount Lemmon	Mount Lemmon Survey	·	970 m	MPC · JPL
349179	2007 RG_{94}	—	September 10, 2007	Kitt Peak	Spacewatch	·	1.9 km	MPC · JPL
349180	2007 RA_{103}	—	September 11, 2007	Catalina	CSS	·	2.4 km	MPC · JPL
349181	2007 RY_{105}	—	September 11, 2007	Catalina	CSS	·	1.9 km	MPC · JPL
349182	2007 RT_{112}	—	September 11, 2007	Kitt Peak	Spacewatch	·	1.6 km	MPC · JPL
349183	2007 RX_{112}	—	November 27, 1995	Kitt Peak	Spacewatch	·	1.2 km	MPC · JPL
349184	2007 RR_{125}	—	September 12, 2007	Catalina	CSS	·	2.4 km	MPC · JPL
349185	2007 RN_{130}	—	September 12, 2007	Mount Lemmon	Mount Lemmon Survey	·	2.2 km	MPC · JPL
349186	2007 RX_{141}	—	September 13, 2007	Socorro	LINEAR	·	2.6 km	MPC · JPL
349187	2007 RQ_{147}	—	September 11, 2007	Purple Mountain	PMO NEO Survey Program	·	1.9 km	MPC · JPL
349188	2007 RV_{149}	—	September 12, 2007	Catalina	CSS	TIR	3.4 km	MPC · JPL
349189	2007 RQ_{157}	—	September 11, 2007	Purple Mountain	PMO NEO Survey Program	GEF	1.5 km	MPC · JPL
349190	2007 RC_{167}	—	September 10, 2007	Kitt Peak	Spacewatch	·	1.6 km	MPC · JPL
349191	2007 RD_{172}	—	September 10, 2007	Kitt Peak	Spacewatch	·	1.4 km	MPC · JPL
349192	2007 RL_{174}	—	September 10, 2007	Kitt Peak	Spacewatch	·	1.2 km	MPC · JPL
349193	2007 RE_{178}	—	September 10, 2007	Kitt Peak	Spacewatch	·	1.6 km	MPC · JPL
349194	2007 RJ_{181}	—	September 11, 2007	Mount Lemmon	Mount Lemmon Survey	·	1.6 km	MPC · JPL
349195	2007 RF_{189}	—	September 10, 2007	Kitt Peak	Spacewatch	·	1.5 km	MPC · JPL
349196	2007 RR_{204}	—	September 9, 2007	Kitt Peak	Spacewatch	·	2.0 km	MPC · JPL
349197	2007 RH_{210}	—	September 10, 2007	Kitt Peak	Spacewatch	·	1.5 km	MPC · JPL
349198	2007 RJ_{211}	—	September 11, 2007	Catalina	CSS	·	3.0 km	MPC · JPL
349199	2007 RC_{228}	—	September 10, 2007	Mount Lemmon	Mount Lemmon Survey	·	1.6 km	MPC · JPL
349200	2007 RT_{232}	—	September 5, 2007	Anderson Mesa	LONEOS	·	810 m	MPC · JPL

== 349201–349300 ==
back to top

Designation			Discovery			Properties		Ref
Permanent	Provisional	Named after	Date	Site	Discoverer(s)	Category	Diam.	Ref
349201	2007 RZ_{239}	—	September 14, 2007	Catalina	CSS	·	2.9 km	MPC · JPL
349202	2007 RZ_{245}	—	September 12, 2007	Catalina	CSS	·	2.9 km	MPC · JPL
349203	2007 RQ_{247}	—	September 13, 2007	Catalina	CSS	·	2.2 km	MPC · JPL
349204	2007 RA_{256}	—	September 14, 2007	Catalina	CSS	·	1.1 km	MPC · JPL
349205	2007 RU_{257}	—	September 14, 2007	Kitt Peak	Spacewatch	·	1.7 km	MPC · JPL
349206	2007 RZ_{269}	—	September 15, 2007	Kitt Peak	Spacewatch	·	1.9 km	MPC · JPL
349207	2007 RM_{273}	—	September 15, 2007	Kitt Peak	Spacewatch	·	2.1 km	MPC · JPL
349208	2007 RY_{278}	—	September 5, 2007	Siding Spring	SSS	MAR	1.4 km	MPC · JPL
349209	2007 RK_{281}	—	September 13, 2007	Catalina	CSS	·	2.4 km	MPC · JPL
349210	2007 RP_{288}	—	September 13, 2007	Catalina	CSS	·	1.9 km	MPC · JPL
349211	2007 RF_{294}	—	September 13, 2007	Kitt Peak	Spacewatch	HOF	2.2 km	MPC · JPL
349212	2007 RF_{302}	—	September 14, 2007	Mount Lemmon	Mount Lemmon Survey	·	1.9 km	MPC · JPL
349213	2007 RB_{303}	—	September 10, 2007	Mount Lemmon	Mount Lemmon Survey	·	2.5 km	MPC · JPL
349214	2007 RE_{308}	—	September 11, 2007	Kitt Peak	Spacewatch	·	1.8 km	MPC · JPL
349215	2007 RG_{312}	—	September 12, 2007	Catalina	CSS	NEM	2.3 km	MPC · JPL
349216	2007 RO_{312}	—	September 13, 2007	Catalina	CSS	·	2.0 km	MPC · JPL
349217	2007 RD_{314}	—	May 10, 2002	Palomar	NEAT	·	1.7 km	MPC · JPL
349218	2007 RX_{315}	—	September 13, 2007	Anderson Mesa	LONEOS	·	2.0 km	MPC · JPL
349219	2007 SV_{11}	—	September 27, 2007	Mount Lemmon	Mount Lemmon Survey	APO +1km	580 m	MPC · JPL
349220	2007 SD_{13}	—	September 19, 2007	Kitt Peak	Spacewatch	HYG	3.4 km	MPC · JPL
349221	2007 SO_{16}	—	September 30, 2007	Kitt Peak	Spacewatch	·	1.5 km	MPC · JPL
349222	2007 TW_{4}	—	October 2, 2007	Charleston	Astronomical Research Observatory	·	1.5 km	MPC · JPL
349223	2007 TB_{8}	—	November 18, 2003	Kitt Peak	Spacewatch	·	880 m	MPC · JPL
349224	2007 TD_{10}	—	September 12, 2007	Mount Lemmon	Mount Lemmon Survey	(5)	1.3 km	MPC · JPL
349225	2007 TL_{14}	—	October 7, 2007	Altschwendt	W. Ries	·	1.4 km	MPC · JPL
349226	2007 TK_{22}	—	October 8, 2007	Kitt Peak	Spacewatch	·	3.7 km	MPC · JPL
349227	2007 TW_{25}	—	October 4, 2007	Kitt Peak	Spacewatch	·	1.8 km	MPC · JPL
349228	2007 TC_{28}	—	October 4, 2007	Kitt Peak	Spacewatch	·	2.1 km	MPC · JPL
349229	2007 TH_{31}	—	October 4, 2007	Kitt Peak	Spacewatch	·	3.3 km	MPC · JPL
349230	2007 TU_{31}	—	October 5, 2007	Siding Spring	SSS	EUN	1.5 km	MPC · JPL
349231	2007 TB_{34}	—	October 6, 2007	Kitt Peak	Spacewatch	·	3.6 km	MPC · JPL
349232	2007 TY_{34}	—	October 6, 2007	Kitt Peak	Spacewatch	·	2.4 km	MPC · JPL
349233	2007 TL_{43}	—	October 7, 2007	Mount Lemmon	Mount Lemmon Survey	·	2.1 km	MPC · JPL
349234	2007 TY_{44}	—	October 7, 2007	Catalina	CSS	·	2.1 km	MPC · JPL
349235	2007 TC_{48}	—	October 4, 2007	Kitt Peak	Spacewatch	·	1.9 km	MPC · JPL
349236	2007 TN_{48}	—	October 4, 2007	Kitt Peak	Spacewatch	·	1.4 km	MPC · JPL
349237 Quaglietti	2007 TH_{69}	Quaglietti	October 13, 2007	Vallemare Borbona	V. S. Casulli	AGN	1.3 km	MPC · JPL
349238	2007 TE_{77}	—	October 5, 2007	Kitt Peak	Spacewatch	HYG	3.2 km	MPC · JPL
349239	2007 TX_{83}	—	October 8, 2007	Catalina	CSS	·	2.6 km	MPC · JPL
349240	2007 TV_{86}	—	October 8, 2007	Mount Lemmon	Mount Lemmon Survey	·	2.3 km	MPC · JPL
349241	2007 TQ_{87}	—	October 8, 2007	Mount Lemmon	Mount Lemmon Survey	·	1.8 km	MPC · JPL
349242	2007 TE_{92}	—	October 4, 2007	Purple Mountain	PMO NEO Survey Program	·	3.0 km	MPC · JPL
349243	2007 TB_{105}	—	March 13, 2005	Kitt Peak	Spacewatch	AGN	1.4 km	MPC · JPL
349244	2007 TV_{109}	—	October 7, 2007	Catalina	CSS	·	2.4 km	MPC · JPL
349245	2007 TW_{111}	—	October 8, 2007	Catalina	CSS	·	2.2 km	MPC · JPL
349246	2007 TA_{113}	—	October 8, 2007	Catalina	CSS	·	2.0 km	MPC · JPL
349247	2007 TH_{113}	—	October 8, 2007	Anderson Mesa	LONEOS	·	2.7 km	MPC · JPL
349248	2007 TF_{120}	—	October 8, 2007	Anderson Mesa	LONEOS	·	1.9 km	MPC · JPL
349249	2007 TE_{121}	—	October 5, 2007	Kitt Peak	Spacewatch	·	1.4 km	MPC · JPL
349250	2007 TT_{122}	—	October 6, 2007	Kitt Peak	Spacewatch	·	2.0 km	MPC · JPL
349251	2007 TT_{127}	—	October 6, 2007	Kitt Peak	Spacewatch	AGN	1.6 km	MPC · JPL
349252	2007 TJ_{130}	—	October 6, 2007	Kitt Peak	Spacewatch	·	1.8 km	MPC · JPL
349253	2007 TX_{130}	—	October 7, 2007	Kitt Peak	Spacewatch	·	680 m	MPC · JPL
349254	2007 TY_{138}	—	October 9, 2007	Catalina	CSS	·	2.9 km	MPC · JPL
349255	2007 TK_{151}	—	October 13, 2007	Catalina	CSS	HNS	1.5 km	MPC · JPL
349256	2007 TJ_{152}	—	October 9, 2007	Socorro	LINEAR	·	2.2 km	MPC · JPL
349257	2007 TY_{152}	—	October 9, 2007	Socorro	LINEAR	·	2.0 km	MPC · JPL
349258	2007 TB_{153}	—	October 9, 2007	Socorro	LINEAR	·	3.3 km	MPC · JPL
349259	2007 TH_{168}	—	October 12, 2007	Socorro	LINEAR	·	2.6 km	MPC · JPL
349260	2007 TS_{175}	—	October 4, 2007	Kitt Peak	Spacewatch	·	2.3 km	MPC · JPL
349261	2007 TG_{180}	—	October 8, 2007	Kitt Peak	Spacewatch	KOR	1.3 km	MPC · JPL
349262	2007 TD_{184}	—	October 9, 2007	Purple Mountain	PMO NEO Survey Program	·	2.8 km	MPC · JPL
349263	2007 TD_{188}	—	October 14, 2007	Goodricke-Pigott	R. A. Tucker	·	1.9 km	MPC · JPL
349264	2007 TW_{191}	—	October 4, 2007	Catalina	CSS	MRX	1.2 km	MPC · JPL
349265	2007 TN_{200}	—	October 8, 2007	Mount Lemmon	Mount Lemmon Survey	MAR	1.2 km	MPC · JPL
349266	2007 TF_{202}	—	October 8, 2007	Mount Lemmon	Mount Lemmon Survey	(11882)	1.6 km	MPC · JPL
349267	2007 TK_{208}	—	October 10, 2007	Mount Lemmon	Mount Lemmon Survey	·	2.0 km	MPC · JPL
349268	2007 TS_{211}	—	October 7, 2007	Kitt Peak	Spacewatch	·	2.0 km	MPC · JPL
349269	2007 TN_{219}	—	September 11, 2007	Mount Lemmon	Mount Lemmon Survey	HOF	2.7 km	MPC · JPL
349270	2007 TS_{227}	—	October 8, 2007	Kitt Peak	Spacewatch	(12739)	1.5 km	MPC · JPL
349271	2007 TU_{233}	—	October 8, 2007	Kitt Peak	Spacewatch	WIT	1.3 km	MPC · JPL
349272	2007 TJ_{266}	—	October 12, 2007	Kitt Peak	Spacewatch	·	2.3 km	MPC · JPL
349273	2007 TH_{268}	—	October 9, 2007	Kitt Peak	Spacewatch	·	720 m	MPC · JPL
349274	2007 TY_{289}	—	October 12, 2007	Catalina	CSS	(32418)	2.8 km	MPC · JPL
349275	2007 TY_{293}	—	September 14, 2007	Mount Lemmon	Mount Lemmon Survey	·	2.2 km	MPC · JPL
349276	2007 TB_{311}	—	October 11, 2007	Kitt Peak	Spacewatch	HOF	2.6 km	MPC · JPL
349277	2007 TH_{319}	—	October 12, 2007	Kitt Peak	Spacewatch	·	1.9 km	MPC · JPL
349278	2007 TF_{324}	—	September 25, 2007	Mount Lemmon	Mount Lemmon Survey	·	1.7 km	MPC · JPL
349279	2007 TK_{331}	—	October 11, 2007	Kitt Peak	Spacewatch	·	850 m	MPC · JPL
349280	2007 TJ_{335}	—	September 18, 2007	Mount Lemmon	Mount Lemmon Survey	·	2.1 km	MPC · JPL
349281	2007 TV_{338}	—	October 15, 2007	Kitt Peak	Spacewatch	·	1.8 km	MPC · JPL
349282	2007 TK_{358}	—	September 9, 2007	Kitt Peak	Spacewatch	·	1.8 km	MPC · JPL
349283	2007 TF_{359}	—	October 14, 2007	Mount Lemmon	Mount Lemmon Survey	·	2.0 km	MPC · JPL
349284	2007 TN_{365}	—	September 10, 2007	Mount Lemmon	Mount Lemmon Survey	JUN	1.1 km	MPC · JPL
349285	2007 TG_{366}	—	October 9, 2007	Catalina	CSS	EUN	1.5 km	MPC · JPL
349286	2007 TW_{371}	—	March 9, 2005	Mount Lemmon	Mount Lemmon Survey	·	2.9 km	MPC · JPL
349287	2007 TX_{372}	—	October 14, 2007	Mount Lemmon	Mount Lemmon Survey	·	2.0 km	MPC · JPL
349288	2007 TP_{377}	—	October 11, 2007	Kitt Peak	Spacewatch	·	1.7 km	MPC · JPL
349289	2007 TY_{381}	—	October 14, 2007	Kitt Peak	Spacewatch	·	2.3 km	MPC · JPL
349290	2007 TA_{386}	—	October 15, 2007	Catalina	CSS	·	3.1 km	MPC · JPL
349291	2007 TV_{387}	—	October 13, 2007	Kitt Peak	Spacewatch	·	1.1 km	MPC · JPL
349292	2007 TD_{408}	—	September 10, 2007	Mount Lemmon	Mount Lemmon Survey	EOS	2.0 km	MPC · JPL
349293	2007 TN_{410}	—	October 13, 2007	Anderson Mesa	LONEOS	·	4.1 km	MPC · JPL
349294	2007 TG_{425}	—	October 8, 2007	Mount Lemmon	Mount Lemmon Survey	PAD	1.7 km	MPC · JPL
349295	2007 TZ_{426}	—	October 9, 2007	Kitt Peak	Spacewatch	·	2.0 km	MPC · JPL
349296	2007 TH_{433}	—	October 9, 2007	Mount Lemmon	Mount Lemmon Survey	·	2.0 km	MPC · JPL
349297	2007 TW_{447}	—	October 14, 2007	Socorro	LINEAR	·	2.3 km	MPC · JPL
349298	2007 TX_{447}	—	October 14, 2007	Goodricke-Pigott	R. A. Tucker	·	2.8 km	MPC · JPL
349299	2007 TE_{448}	—	October 5, 2007	Kitt Peak	Spacewatch	·	3.2 km	MPC · JPL
349300	2007 TQ_{448}	—	February 16, 2004	Kitt Peak	Spacewatch	·	2.4 km	MPC · JPL

== 349301–349400 ==
back to top

Designation			Discovery			Properties		Ref
Permanent	Provisional	Named after	Date	Site	Discoverer(s)	Category	Diam.	Ref
349301	2007 TX_{451}	—	October 12, 2007	Catalina	CSS	·	1.7 km	MPC · JPL
349302	2007 UF_{9}	—	October 17, 2007	Anderson Mesa	LONEOS	·	2.5 km	MPC · JPL
349303	2007 UB_{10}	—	October 17, 2007	Anderson Mesa	LONEOS	·	2.8 km	MPC · JPL
349304	2007 UF_{18}	—	October 17, 2007	Anderson Mesa	LONEOS	·	2.3 km	MPC · JPL
349305	2007 UN_{31}	—	October 19, 2007	Catalina	CSS	·	2.4 km	MPC · JPL
349306	2007 UA_{41}	—	October 16, 2007	Kitt Peak	Spacewatch	KOR	1.4 km	MPC · JPL
349307	2007 UT_{42}	—	October 16, 2007	Kitt Peak	Spacewatch	T_{j} (2.98) · EUP	6.1 km	MPC · JPL
349308	2007 UU_{45}	—	October 19, 2007	Kitt Peak	Spacewatch	VER	3.4 km	MPC · JPL
349309	2007 UO_{51}	—	October 20, 2007	Catalina	CSS	·	2.2 km	MPC · JPL
349310	2007 UB_{54}	—	October 30, 2007	Kitt Peak	Spacewatch	·	2.0 km	MPC · JPL
349311	2007 UW_{56}	—	October 30, 2007	Mount Lemmon	Mount Lemmon Survey	·	2.2 km	MPC · JPL
349312	2007 UU_{58}	—	October 30, 2007	Mount Lemmon	Mount Lemmon Survey	KOR	1.4 km	MPC · JPL
349313	2007 UL_{68}	—	October 30, 2007	Kitt Peak	Spacewatch	·	3.7 km	MPC · JPL
349314	2007 UG_{81}	—	October 30, 2007	Kitt Peak	Spacewatch	HOF	2.6 km	MPC · JPL
349315	2007 UP_{90}	—	October 30, 2007	Mount Lemmon	Mount Lemmon Survey	·	1.6 km	MPC · JPL
349316	2007 UQ_{93}	—	October 31, 2007	Mount Lemmon	Mount Lemmon Survey	·	2.3 km	MPC · JPL
349317	2007 UY_{100}	—	October 30, 2007	Kitt Peak	Spacewatch	KOR	1.6 km	MPC · JPL
349318	2007 UV_{101}	—	October 30, 2007	Kitt Peak	Spacewatch	·	870 m	MPC · JPL
349319	2007 UN_{103}	—	October 30, 2007	Mount Lemmon	Mount Lemmon Survey	·	1.9 km	MPC · JPL
349320	2007 UO_{104}	—	October 30, 2007	Kitt Peak	Spacewatch	·	2.5 km	MPC · JPL
349321	2007 UJ_{109}	—	October 30, 2007	Kitt Peak	Spacewatch	KOR	1.4 km	MPC · JPL
349322	2007 UQ_{110}	—	October 30, 2007	Mount Lemmon	Mount Lemmon Survey	·	2.1 km	MPC · JPL
349323	2007 UG_{123}	—	October 31, 2007	Kitt Peak	Spacewatch	·	1.9 km	MPC · JPL
349324	2007 UQ_{129}	—	October 30, 2007	Kitt Peak	Spacewatch	·	2.2 km	MPC · JPL
349325	2007 UW_{132}	—	October 20, 2007	Mount Lemmon	Mount Lemmon Survey	KOR	1.4 km	MPC · JPL
349326	2007 UT_{133}	—	October 26, 2007	Mount Lemmon	Mount Lemmon Survey	·	3.6 km	MPC · JPL
349327	2007 VJ	—	November 1, 2007	Eskridge	G. Hug	·	1.9 km	MPC · JPL
349328	2007 VJ_{1}	—	November 1, 2007	Pla D'Arguines	R. Ferrando	·	1.9 km	MPC · JPL
349329	2007 VS_{5}	—	November 4, 2007	La Sagra	OAM	·	1.4 km	MPC · JPL
349330	2007 VK_{7}	—	November 2, 2007	Eskridge	G. Hug	·	2.6 km	MPC · JPL
349331	2007 VP_{11}	—	October 20, 2007	Mount Lemmon	Mount Lemmon Survey	MAR	1.6 km	MPC · JPL
349332	2007 VD_{28}	—	November 2, 2007	Kitt Peak	Spacewatch	KOR	1.2 km	MPC · JPL
349333	2007 VJ_{43}	—	November 4, 2007	Mount Lemmon	Mount Lemmon Survey	·	3.2 km	MPC · JPL
349334	2007 VS_{45}	—	November 1, 2007	Kitt Peak	Spacewatch	·	2.0 km	MPC · JPL
349335	2007 VV_{49}	—	November 1, 2007	Kitt Peak	Spacewatch	·	2.7 km	MPC · JPL
349336	2007 VT_{56}	—	November 1, 2007	Kitt Peak	Spacewatch	EOS	2.4 km	MPC · JPL
349337	2007 VZ_{56}	—	November 1, 2007	Kitt Peak	Spacewatch	·	1.7 km	MPC · JPL
349338	2007 VH_{59}	—	November 1, 2007	Kitt Peak	Spacewatch	HOF	2.5 km	MPC · JPL
349339	2007 VW_{76}	—	November 3, 2007	Kitt Peak	Spacewatch	KOR	1.4 km	MPC · JPL
349340	2007 VU_{80}	—	November 4, 2007	Kitt Peak	Spacewatch	·	1.7 km	MPC · JPL
349341	2007 VE_{82}	—	October 5, 2002	Palomar	NEAT	·	2.1 km	MPC · JPL
349342	2007 VV_{87}	—	November 2, 2007	Socorro	LINEAR	·	5.1 km	MPC · JPL
349343	2007 VU_{93}	—	October 19, 2007	Catalina	CSS	·	2.8 km	MPC · JPL
349344	2007 VR_{95}	—	November 8, 2007	Socorro	LINEAR	BRA	1.9 km	MPC · JPL
349345	2007 VP_{101}	—	May 8, 2005	Mount Lemmon	Mount Lemmon Survey	·	2.3 km	MPC · JPL
349346	2007 VG_{108}	—	September 10, 2007	Mount Lemmon	Mount Lemmon Survey	·	2.3 km	MPC · JPL
349347	2007 VQ_{108}	—	November 3, 2007	Kitt Peak	Spacewatch	·	2.0 km	MPC · JPL
349348	2007 VZ_{117}	—	November 4, 2007	Kitt Peak	Spacewatch	KOR	1.4 km	MPC · JPL
349349	2007 VG_{119}	—	November 4, 2007	Mount Lemmon	Mount Lemmon Survey	·	6.1 km	MPC · JPL
349350	2007 VN_{119}	—	November 5, 2007	Kitt Peak	Spacewatch	AST	1.7 km	MPC · JPL
349351	2007 VD_{124}	—	November 5, 2007	Kitt Peak	Spacewatch	·	1.5 km	MPC · JPL
349352	2007 VL_{124}	—	November 5, 2007	Mount Lemmon	Mount Lemmon Survey	·	2.9 km	MPC · JPL
349353	2007 VP_{128}	—	November 1, 2007	Mount Lemmon	Mount Lemmon Survey	HOF	2.2 km	MPC · JPL
349354	2007 VS_{136}	—	November 4, 2007	Mount Lemmon	Mount Lemmon Survey	·	2.0 km	MPC · JPL
349355	2007 VM_{145}	—	November 4, 2007	Kitt Peak	Spacewatch	·	2.4 km	MPC · JPL
349356	2007 VJ_{146}	—	November 4, 2007	Kitt Peak	Spacewatch	AGN	1.1 km	MPC · JPL
349357	2007 VC_{170}	—	November 5, 2007	Purple Mountain	PMO NEO Survey Program	EOS	2.4 km	MPC · JPL
349358	2007 VV_{183}	—	November 8, 2007	Mount Lemmon	Mount Lemmon Survey	EOS	2.7 km	MPC · JPL
349359	2007 VK_{190}	—	November 14, 2007	Bisei SG Center	BATTeRS	GEF	1.6 km	MPC · JPL
349360	2007 VL_{190}	—	October 31, 2007	Kitt Peak	Spacewatch	WIT	1.2 km	MPC · JPL
349361	2007 VQ_{191}	—	November 4, 2007	Mount Lemmon	Mount Lemmon Survey	·	5.3 km	MPC · JPL
349362	2007 VC_{197}	—	October 15, 2007	Mount Lemmon	Mount Lemmon Survey	·	2.7 km	MPC · JPL
349363	2007 VW_{206}	—	November 9, 2007	Catalina	CSS	·	2.6 km	MPC · JPL
349364	2007 VM_{209}	—	November 7, 2007	Kitt Peak	Spacewatch	·	1.8 km	MPC · JPL
349365	2007 VT_{223}	—	November 7, 2007	Catalina	CSS	·	2.5 km	MPC · JPL
349366	2007 VB_{227}	—	November 11, 2007	Purple Mountain	PMO NEO Survey Program	·	1.1 km	MPC · JPL
349367	2007 VL_{235}	—	November 9, 2007	Kitt Peak	Spacewatch	KOR	1.4 km	MPC · JPL
349368	2007 VS_{244}	—	November 12, 2007	Marly	P. Kocher	·	1.5 km	MPC · JPL
349369	2007 VE_{272}	—	November 11, 2007	Mount Lemmon	Mount Lemmon Survey	·	2.5 km	MPC · JPL
349370	2007 VW_{274}	—	November 13, 2007	Mount Lemmon	Mount Lemmon Survey	·	2.4 km	MPC · JPL
349371	2007 VQ_{283}	—	November 14, 2007	Kitt Peak	Spacewatch	KOR	1.6 km	MPC · JPL
349372	2007 VL_{301}	—	November 15, 2007	Catalina	CSS	·	2.9 km	MPC · JPL
349373	2007 VW_{303}	—	November 4, 2007	Catalina	CSS	·	2.8 km	MPC · JPL
349374	2007 VV_{309}	—	November 3, 2007	Mount Lemmon	Mount Lemmon Survey	EOS	2.4 km	MPC · JPL
349375	2007 VY_{309}	—	November 4, 2007	Mount Lemmon	Mount Lemmon Survey	·	2.3 km	MPC · JPL
349376	2007 VL_{310}	—	November 7, 2007	Mount Lemmon	Mount Lemmon Survey	·	3.1 km	MPC · JPL
349377	2007 VC_{323}	—	November 2, 2007	Socorro	LINEAR	·	2.5 km	MPC · JPL
349378	2007 VG_{326}	—	November 3, 2007	Kitt Peak	Spacewatch	·	2.6 km	MPC · JPL
349379	2007 WR_{3}	—	November 17, 2007	Costitx	OAM	·	2.7 km	MPC · JPL
349380	2007 WX_{5}	—	November 17, 2007	Socorro	LINEAR	·	2.6 km	MPC · JPL
349381	2007 WX_{9}	—	November 17, 2007	Mount Lemmon	Mount Lemmon Survey	·	1.9 km	MPC · JPL
349382	2007 WZ_{33}	—	November 4, 2007	Kitt Peak	Spacewatch	·	2.3 km	MPC · JPL
349383	2007 WN_{39}	—	October 12, 2007	Mount Lemmon	Mount Lemmon Survey	·	2.1 km	MPC · JPL
349384	2007 WF_{51}	—	November 20, 2007	Mount Lemmon	Mount Lemmon Survey	KOR	1.3 km	MPC · JPL
349385	2007 WU_{55}	—	November 29, 2007	Lulin	LUSS	EUN	1.6 km	MPC · JPL
349386 Randywright	2007 WA_{56}	Randywright	November 30, 2007	Charleston	R. Holmes	·	2.4 km	MPC · JPL
349387	2007 WR_{61}	—	November 16, 2007	Socorro	LINEAR	615	1.8 km	MPC · JPL
349388	2007 WC_{62}	—	November 17, 2007	Mount Lemmon	Mount Lemmon Survey	·	2.5 km	MPC · JPL
349389	2007 XU_{2}	—	December 3, 2007	Kitt Peak	Spacewatch	EOS	2.2 km	MPC · JPL
349390	2007 XT_{15}	—	December 8, 2007	La Sagra	OAM	·	2.6 km	MPC · JPL
349391	2007 XG_{18}	—	December 12, 2007	La Sagra	OAM	·	2.6 km	MPC · JPL
349392	2007 XQ_{28}	—	April 19, 2004	Kitt Peak	Spacewatch	·	1.9 km	MPC · JPL
349393	2007 XR_{39}	—	December 31, 2002	Socorro	LINEAR	·	2.3 km	MPC · JPL
349394	2007 XN_{40}	—	December 13, 2007	Socorro	LINEAR	·	3.2 km	MPC · JPL
349395	2007 XX_{40}	—	December 5, 2002	Socorro	LINEAR	·	2.8 km	MPC · JPL
349396	2007 XW_{46}	—	December 4, 2007	Mount Lemmon	Mount Lemmon Survey	EOS	2.3 km	MPC · JPL
349397	2007 XM_{52}	—	December 6, 2007	Mount Lemmon	Mount Lemmon Survey	·	3.5 km	MPC · JPL
349398	2007 XZ_{54}	—	December 4, 2007	Mount Lemmon	Mount Lemmon Survey	·	2.2 km	MPC · JPL
349399	2007 XD_{56}	—	December 2, 2007	Socorro	LINEAR	EUP	4.5 km	MPC · JPL
349400	2007 YK_{3}	—	December 17, 2007	Piszkéstető	K. Sárneczky	EOS	2.2 km	MPC · JPL

== 349401–349500 ==
back to top

Designation			Discovery			Properties		Ref
Permanent	Provisional	Named after	Date	Site	Discoverer(s)	Category	Diam.	Ref
349401	2007 YK_{11}	—	December 17, 2007	Mount Lemmon	Mount Lemmon Survey	·	2.2 km	MPC · JPL
349402	2007 YL_{12}	—	December 17, 2007	Mount Lemmon	Mount Lemmon Survey	TIR	3.6 km	MPC · JPL
349403	2007 YP_{13}	—	December 17, 2007	Mount Lemmon	Mount Lemmon Survey	H	580 m	MPC · JPL
349404	2007 YR_{13}	—	December 17, 2007	Mount Lemmon	Mount Lemmon Survey	·	3.9 km	MPC · JPL
349405	2007 YF_{26}	—	December 18, 2007	Mount Lemmon	Mount Lemmon Survey	·	4.6 km	MPC · JPL
349406	2007 YU_{27}	—	December 18, 2007	Kitt Peak	Spacewatch	EOS	2.1 km	MPC · JPL
349407 Stefaniafoglia	2007 YY_{29}	Stefaniafoglia	December 29, 2007	Suno	Suno	·	4.2 km	MPC · JPL
349408	2007 YQ_{32}	—	December 28, 2007	Kitt Peak	Spacewatch	·	2.7 km	MPC · JPL
349409	2007 YS_{41}	—	December 30, 2007	Kitt Peak	Spacewatch	·	3.3 km	MPC · JPL
349410	2007 YD_{42}	—	December 30, 2007	Kitt Peak	Spacewatch	THM	2.2 km	MPC · JPL
349411	2007 YT_{48}	—	December 28, 2007	Kitt Peak	Spacewatch	·	3.0 km	MPC · JPL
349412	2007 YC_{49}	—	December 28, 2007	Kitt Peak	Spacewatch	·	3.8 km	MPC · JPL
349413	2007 YT_{54}	—	December 31, 2007	Catalina	CSS	·	3.9 km	MPC · JPL
349414	2007 YA_{66}	—	December 30, 2007	Catalina	CSS	·	2.6 km	MPC · JPL
349415	2007 YH_{68}	—	December 30, 2007	Kitt Peak	Spacewatch	·	2.8 km	MPC · JPL
349416	2008 AL_{5}	—	November 4, 2007	Kitt Peak	Spacewatch	·	2.6 km	MPC · JPL
349417	2008 AF_{7}	—	January 10, 2008	Mount Lemmon	Mount Lemmon Survey	·	1.9 km	MPC · JPL
349418	2008 AB_{10}	—	January 10, 2008	Mount Lemmon	Mount Lemmon Survey	EOS	2.2 km	MPC · JPL
349419	2008 AO_{19}	—	January 10, 2008	Mount Lemmon	Mount Lemmon Survey	·	1.8 km	MPC · JPL
349420	2008 AX_{19}	—	January 10, 2008	Catalina	CSS	TIR	3.7 km	MPC · JPL
349421	2008 AJ_{22}	—	January 10, 2008	Mount Lemmon	Mount Lemmon Survey	HYG	3.4 km	MPC · JPL
349422	2008 AG_{29}	—	January 5, 2008	Purple Mountain	PMO NEO Survey Program	·	3.8 km	MPC · JPL
349423	2008 AK_{37}	—	January 10, 2008	Kitt Peak	Spacewatch	·	2.4 km	MPC · JPL
349424	2008 AE_{42}	—	January 10, 2008	Catalina	CSS	H	610 m	MPC · JPL
349425	2008 AD_{46}	—	November 5, 2007	Kitt Peak	Spacewatch	KOR	1.5 km	MPC · JPL
349426	2008 AJ_{46}	—	January 11, 2008	Kitt Peak	Spacewatch	·	1.8 km	MPC · JPL
349427	2008 AJ_{57}	—	January 11, 2008	Kitt Peak	Spacewatch	·	2.5 km	MPC · JPL
349428	2008 AZ_{67}	—	January 11, 2008	Kitt Peak	Spacewatch	VER	3.1 km	MPC · JPL
349429	2008 AO_{69}	—	January 11, 2008	Kitt Peak	Spacewatch	·	410 m	MPC · JPL
349430	2008 AT_{84}	—	January 10, 2008	Catalina	CSS	·	4.9 km	MPC · JPL
349431	2008 AN_{85}	—	January 13, 2008	Kitt Peak	Spacewatch	·	3.8 km	MPC · JPL
349432	2008 AV_{109}	—	January 15, 2008	Kitt Peak	Spacewatch	·	990 m	MPC · JPL
349433	2008 AW_{109}	—	January 15, 2008	Kitt Peak	Spacewatch	·	3.3 km	MPC · JPL
349434	2008 AL_{134}	—	January 1, 2008	Mount Lemmon	Mount Lemmon Survey	EOS	2.1 km	MPC · JPL
349435	2008 AJ_{135}	—	March 25, 2003	Palomar	NEAT	·	3.4 km	MPC · JPL
349436	2008 AL_{135}	—	January 11, 2008	Catalina	CSS	·	2.4 km	MPC · JPL
349437	2008 BP	—	April 23, 1998	Kitt Peak	Spacewatch	·	4.6 km	MPC · JPL
349438	2008 BA_{1}	—	January 16, 2008	Mount Lemmon	Mount Lemmon Survey	·	4.0 km	MPC · JPL
349439	2008 BF_{1}	—	January 16, 2008	Mount Lemmon	Mount Lemmon Survey	·	5.1 km	MPC · JPL
349440	2008 BQ_{2}	—	January 19, 2008	Mount Lemmon	Mount Lemmon Survey	H	630 m	MPC · JPL
349441	2008 BB_{4}	—	January 16, 2008	Kitt Peak	Spacewatch	·	850 m	MPC · JPL
349442	2008 BK_{22}	—	January 31, 2008	Mount Lemmon	Mount Lemmon Survey	·	2.9 km	MPC · JPL
349443	2008 BT_{36}	—	January 30, 2008	Catalina	CSS	H	620 m	MPC · JPL
349444	2008 BM_{39}	—	January 30, 2008	Catalina	CSS	·	2.2 km	MPC · JPL
349445	2008 BH_{50}	—	December 30, 2007	Kitt Peak	Spacewatch	·	2.0 km	MPC · JPL
349446	2008 CA_{2}	—	February 1, 2008	La Sagra	OAM	·	3.0 km	MPC · JPL
349447	2008 CM_{8}	—	February 2, 2008	Catalina	CSS	·	4.1 km	MPC · JPL
349448	2008 CJ_{54}	—	January 11, 2008	Lulin	LUSS	·	2.7 km	MPC · JPL
349449	2008 CS_{59}	—	February 7, 2008	Mount Lemmon	Mount Lemmon Survey	·	3.9 km	MPC · JPL
349450	2008 CF_{69}	—	February 8, 2008	Bergisch Gladbach	W. Bickel	EOS	2.2 km	MPC · JPL
349451	2008 CH_{69}	—	February 8, 2008	Mayhill	Dillon, W. G.	·	3.9 km	MPC · JPL
349452	2008 CK_{71}	—	February 6, 2008	Catalina	CSS	·	4.2 km	MPC · JPL
349453	2008 CD_{76}	—	February 3, 2008	Kitt Peak	Spacewatch	TIR	3.6 km	MPC · JPL
349454	2008 CK_{79}	—	February 7, 2008	Kitt Peak	Spacewatch	·	1.7 km	MPC · JPL
349455	2008 CL_{85}	—	February 7, 2008	Kitt Peak	Spacewatch	·	3.8 km	MPC · JPL
349456	2008 CZ_{93}	—	February 8, 2008	Mount Lemmon	Mount Lemmon Survey	·	2.9 km	MPC · JPL
349457	2008 CT_{114}	—	August 31, 2005	Kitt Peak	Spacewatch	·	2.9 km	MPC · JPL
349458	2008 CP_{117}	—	February 11, 2008	Dauban	Kugel, F.	·	1.8 km	MPC · JPL
349459	2008 CH_{118}	—	February 11, 2008	Costitx	OAM	·	3.1 km	MPC · JPL
349460	2008 CH_{128}	—	February 8, 2008	Kitt Peak	Spacewatch	V	590 m	MPC · JPL
349461	2008 CQ_{134}	—	February 8, 2008	Mount Lemmon	Mount Lemmon Survey	·	3.0 km	MPC · JPL
349462	2008 CS_{136}	—	February 8, 2008	Mount Lemmon	Mount Lemmon Survey	·	3.9 km	MPC · JPL
349463	2008 CB_{137}	—	February 8, 2008	Mount Lemmon	Mount Lemmon Survey	·	3.5 km	MPC · JPL
349464	2008 CN_{137}	—	February 8, 2008	Kitt Peak	Spacewatch	·	3.7 km	MPC · JPL
349465	2008 CT_{149}	—	February 9, 2008	Kitt Peak	Spacewatch	·	3.2 km	MPC · JPL
349466	2008 CO_{163}	—	February 10, 2008	Catalina	CSS	LIX	6.1 km	MPC · JPL
349467	2008 CE_{168}	—	February 11, 2008	Mount Lemmon	Mount Lemmon Survey	MRX	1.3 km	MPC · JPL
349468	2008 CV_{175}	—	February 10, 2008	Mount Lemmon	Mount Lemmon Survey	·	3.5 km	MPC · JPL
349469	2008 CW_{175}	—	February 6, 2008	Catalina	CSS	·	4.0 km	MPC · JPL
349470	2008 CT_{181}	—	February 9, 2008	Siding Spring	SSS	EUP	5.5 km	MPC · JPL
349471	2008 CP_{188}	—	February 10, 2008	Catalina	CSS	·	5.5 km	MPC · JPL
349472	2008 CD_{212}	—	July 6, 2005	Kitt Peak	Spacewatch	·	3.6 km	MPC · JPL
349473	2008 CF_{214}	—	February 11, 2008	Socorro	LINEAR	·	3.1 km	MPC · JPL
349474	2008 DE_{3}	—	January 11, 2008	Kitt Peak	Spacewatch	EOS	2.1 km	MPC · JPL
349475	2008 DA_{9}	—	February 25, 2008	Kitt Peak	Spacewatch	·	4.8 km	MPC · JPL
349476	2008 DX_{23}	—	February 26, 2008	Mount Lemmon	Mount Lemmon Survey	VER	3.5 km	MPC · JPL
349477	2008 DA_{24}	—	February 26, 2008	Kitt Peak	Spacewatch	·	2.9 km	MPC · JPL
349478	2008 DK_{25}	—	February 28, 2008	Mount Lemmon	Mount Lemmon Survey	·	3.5 km	MPC · JPL
349479	2008 DW_{42}	—	February 28, 2008	Kitt Peak	Spacewatch	·	1.9 km	MPC · JPL
349480	2008 DS_{72}	—	February 26, 2008	Mount Lemmon	Mount Lemmon Survey	HIL · 3:2	5.5 km	MPC · JPL
349481	2008 DO_{73}	—	February 27, 2008	Mount Lemmon	Mount Lemmon Survey	TEL	1.9 km	MPC · JPL
349482	2008 DV_{73}	—	February 27, 2008	Mount Lemmon	Mount Lemmon Survey	·	2.5 km	MPC · JPL
349483	2008 DC_{88}	—	February 18, 2008	Mount Lemmon	Mount Lemmon Survey	·	3.4 km	MPC · JPL
349484	2008 EW_{9}	—	March 1, 2008	Kitt Peak	Spacewatch	(21344)	1.3 km	MPC · JPL
349485	2008 EQ_{92}	—	March 3, 2008	Catalina	CSS	H	660 m	MPC · JPL
349486	2008 EW_{143}	—	March 15, 2008	Mount Lemmon	Mount Lemmon Survey	·	3.9 km	MPC · JPL
349487	2008 EZ_{163}	—	March 9, 2008	Socorro	LINEAR	·	2.8 km	MPC · JPL
349488	2008 FV_{14}	—	March 26, 2008	Mount Lemmon	Mount Lemmon Survey	THM	3.0 km	MPC · JPL
349489	2008 FC_{131}	—	March 29, 2008	Mount Lemmon	Mount Lemmon Survey	·	2.9 km	MPC · JPL
349490	2008 GG_{22}	—	April 1, 2008	Kitt Peak	Spacewatch	·	630 m	MPC · JPL
349491	2008 GB_{29}	—	April 3, 2008	Catalina	CSS	EUP	4.5 km	MPC · JPL
349492	2008 GB_{30}	—	April 3, 2008	Catalina	CSS	H	640 m	MPC · JPL
349493	2008 GN_{39}	—	April 4, 2008	Kitt Peak	Spacewatch	·	2.5 km	MPC · JPL
349494	2008 GK_{121}	—	January 19, 2008	Mount Lemmon	Mount Lemmon Survey	·	2.7 km	MPC · JPL
349495	2008 JH_{35}	—	May 3, 2008	Siding Spring	SSS	·	5.3 km	MPC · JPL
349496	2008 KZ_{34}	—	May 27, 2008	Kitt Peak	Spacewatch	L5	13 km	MPC · JPL
349497	2008 NK	—	July 1, 2008	Kitt Peak	Spacewatch	·	790 m	MPC · JPL
349498	2008 ND_{3}	—	July 11, 2008	La Sagra	OAM	·	730 m	MPC · JPL
349499 Dechirico	2008 OX_{5}	Dechirico	July 29, 2008	Vallemare Borbona	V. S. Casulli	·	820 m	MPC · JPL
349500	2008 OH_{8}	—	July 29, 2008	La Sagra	OAM	·	940 m	MPC · JPL

== 349501–349600 ==
back to top

Designation			Discovery			Properties		Ref
Permanent	Provisional	Named after	Date	Site	Discoverer(s)	Category	Diam.	Ref
349501	2008 OT_{19}	—	July 29, 2008	Kitt Peak	Spacewatch	MAS	540 m	MPC · JPL
349502	2008 OR_{24}	—	July 31, 2008	Socorro	LINEAR	·	760 m	MPC · JPL
349503	2008 PW_{2}	—	August 3, 2008	Dauban	Kugel, F.	·	880 m	MPC · JPL
349504	2008 PQ_{11}	—	August 9, 2008	Reedy Creek	J. Broughton	·	820 m	MPC · JPL
349505	2008 PE_{14}	—	August 10, 2008	La Sagra	OAM	·	690 m	MPC · JPL
349506	2008 PT_{17}	—	August 11, 2008	Dauban	Kugel, F.	·	1.1 km	MPC · JPL
349507	2008 QY	—	August 21, 2008	Kitt Peak	Spacewatch	APO · PHA	710 m	MPC · JPL
349508	2008 QJ_{5}	—	August 22, 2008	Kitt Peak	Spacewatch	·	2.9 km	MPC · JPL
349509	2008 QR_{5}	—	August 22, 2008	Kitt Peak	Spacewatch	NYS	1.2 km	MPC · JPL
349510	2008 QP_{12}	—	August 26, 2008	La Sagra	OAM	·	1.2 km	MPC · JPL
349511	2008 QR_{12}	—	August 26, 2008	La Sagra	OAM	·	750 m	MPC · JPL
349512	2008 QM_{46}	—	August 25, 2008	Socorro	LINEAR	·	1.1 km	MPC · JPL
349513	2008 RS	—	September 2, 2008	Hibiscus	S. F. Hönig, Teamo, N.	V	760 m	MPC · JPL
349514	2008 RM_{8}	—	September 3, 2008	Kitt Peak	Spacewatch	·	940 m	MPC · JPL
349515	2008 RE_{14}	—	September 4, 2008	Kitt Peak	Spacewatch	·	870 m	MPC · JPL
349516	2008 RY_{14}	—	September 4, 2008	Kitt Peak	Spacewatch	V	610 m	MPC · JPL
349517	2008 RM_{23}	—	September 4, 2008	Socorro	LINEAR	·	2.6 km	MPC · JPL
349518	2008 RL_{30}	—	September 2, 2008	Kitt Peak	Spacewatch	MAS	820 m	MPC · JPL
349519	2008 RW_{30}	—	September 2, 2008	Kitt Peak	Spacewatch	·	800 m	MPC · JPL
349520	2008 RU_{40}	—	September 2, 2008	Kitt Peak	Spacewatch	·	1.1 km	MPC · JPL
349521	2008 RA_{62}	—	September 4, 2008	Kitt Peak	Spacewatch	·	800 m	MPC · JPL
349522	2008 RF_{68}	—	September 4, 2008	Kitt Peak	Spacewatch	·	1.1 km	MPC · JPL
349523	2008 RY_{73}	—	October 14, 2001	Kitt Peak	Spacewatch	NYS	980 m	MPC · JPL
349524	2008 RG_{74}	—	September 6, 2008	Catalina	CSS	·	810 m	MPC · JPL
349525	2008 RL_{95}	—	September 7, 2008	Catalina	CSS	·	930 m	MPC · JPL
349526	2008 RH_{96}	—	September 7, 2008	Mount Lemmon	Mount Lemmon Survey	·	1.5 km	MPC · JPL
349527	2008 RS_{113}	—	September 6, 2008	Kitt Peak	Spacewatch	·	1.7 km	MPC · JPL
349528	2008 RN_{130}	—	September 6, 2008	Mount Lemmon	Mount Lemmon Survey	·	1.1 km	MPC · JPL
349529	2008 RX_{135}	—	September 4, 2008	Kitt Peak	Spacewatch	·	1.0 km	MPC · JPL
349530	2008 RY_{138}	—	September 6, 2008	Catalina	CSS	·	1.5 km	MPC · JPL
349531	2008 SQ_{2}	—	September 6, 2008	Catalina	CSS	·	1.3 km	MPC · JPL
349532	2008 SF_{3}	—	September 22, 2008	Socorro	LINEAR	·	1.3 km	MPC · JPL
349533	2008 SO_{5}	—	September 22, 2008	Socorro	LINEAR	·	1.1 km	MPC · JPL
349534	2008 ST_{8}	—	September 22, 2008	Socorro	LINEAR	·	710 m	MPC · JPL
349535	2008 SZ_{13}	—	September 19, 2008	Kitt Peak	Spacewatch	·	800 m	MPC · JPL
349536	2008 ST_{18}	—	September 19, 2008	Kitt Peak	Spacewatch	·	700 m	MPC · JPL
349537	2008 SG_{24}	—	November 1, 2005	Mount Lemmon	Mount Lemmon Survey	·	1.1 km	MPC · JPL
349538	2008 SC_{27}	—	September 19, 2008	Kitt Peak	Spacewatch	·	1.1 km	MPC · JPL
349539	2008 SM_{32}	—	September 20, 2008	Kitt Peak	Spacewatch	·	1.1 km	MPC · JPL
349540	2008 SG_{41}	—	September 20, 2008	Catalina	CSS	·	920 m	MPC · JPL
349541	2008 SS_{52}	—	September 20, 2008	Mount Lemmon	Mount Lemmon Survey	·	940 m	MPC · JPL
349542	2008 SW_{53}	—	September 20, 2008	Mount Lemmon	Mount Lemmon Survey	MAS	760 m	MPC · JPL
349543	2008 SM_{67}	—	September 21, 2008	Kitt Peak	Spacewatch	·	1.1 km	MPC · JPL
349544	2008 SM_{78}	—	September 23, 2008	Mount Lemmon	Mount Lemmon Survey	·	830 m	MPC · JPL
349545	2008 SX_{87}	—	September 20, 2008	Kitt Peak	Spacewatch	·	1.0 km	MPC · JPL
349546	2008 SU_{98}	—	September 21, 2008	Kitt Peak	Spacewatch	·	1.2 km	MPC · JPL
349547	2008 SO_{106}	—	September 21, 2008	Kitt Peak	Spacewatch	·	1.6 km	MPC · JPL
349548	2008 SY_{110}	—	September 22, 2008	Kitt Peak	Spacewatch	·	1.4 km	MPC · JPL
349549	2008 SE_{111}	—	September 22, 2008	Kitt Peak	Spacewatch	MAS	800 m	MPC · JPL
349550	2008 ST_{120}	—	September 22, 2008	Mount Lemmon	Mount Lemmon Survey	NYS	890 m	MPC · JPL
349551	2008 SA_{122}	—	September 22, 2008	Mount Lemmon	Mount Lemmon Survey	·	1.2 km	MPC · JPL
349552	2008 SD_{126}	—	September 22, 2008	Mount Lemmon	Mount Lemmon Survey	·	1.7 km	MPC · JPL
349553	2008 SE_{128}	—	September 22, 2008	Kitt Peak	Spacewatch	·	1.2 km	MPC · JPL
349554	2008 SU_{141}	—	September 24, 2008	Catalina	CSS	·	2.0 km	MPC · JPL
349555	2008 SX_{142}	—	September 24, 2008	Mount Lemmon	Mount Lemmon Survey	NYS	1.1 km	MPC · JPL
349556	2008 SL_{143}	—	September 24, 2008	Mount Lemmon	Mount Lemmon Survey	·	1.1 km	MPC · JPL
349557	2008 SJ_{145}	—	September 26, 2008	Kitt Peak	Spacewatch	·	1.2 km	MPC · JPL
349558	2008 SB_{147}	—	September 24, 2008	Catalina	CSS	·	1.3 km	MPC · JPL
349559	2008 SX_{157}	—	September 24, 2008	Socorro	LINEAR	·	920 m	MPC · JPL
349560	2008 SN_{158}	—	September 24, 2008	Socorro	LINEAR	·	1.3 km	MPC · JPL
349561	2008 SS_{159}	—	September 24, 2008	Socorro	LINEAR	NYS	980 m	MPC · JPL
349562	2008 SD_{163}	—	September 28, 2008	Socorro	LINEAR	·	1.3 km	MPC · JPL
349563	2008 SY_{165}	—	September 2, 2008	Kitt Peak	Spacewatch	MAS	750 m	MPC · JPL
349564	2008 SE_{172}	—	September 21, 2008	Catalina	CSS	·	1.0 km	MPC · JPL
349565	2008 SX_{175}	—	September 23, 2008	Catalina	CSS	V	800 m	MPC · JPL
349566	2008 SC_{182}	—	September 24, 2008	Mount Lemmon	Mount Lemmon Survey	·	1.4 km	MPC · JPL
349567	2008 SP_{184}	—	September 24, 2008	Kitt Peak	Spacewatch	·	1.3 km	MPC · JPL
349568	2008 SQ_{185}	—	March 12, 2007	Kitt Peak	Spacewatch	·	1.0 km	MPC · JPL
349569	2008 SN_{199}	—	September 26, 2008	Kitt Peak	Spacewatch	·	1.4 km	MPC · JPL
349570	2008 SP_{203}	—	September 26, 2008	Kitt Peak	Spacewatch	·	1.2 km	MPC · JPL
349571	2008 SH_{235}	—	September 28, 2008	Mount Lemmon	Mount Lemmon Survey	MAS	800 m	MPC · JPL
349572	2008 SZ_{235}	—	September 28, 2008	Mount Lemmon	Mount Lemmon Survey	·	1.3 km	MPC · JPL
349573	2008 SR_{240}	—	September 29, 2008	Kitt Peak	Spacewatch	·	1.3 km	MPC · JPL
349574	2008 SH_{241}	—	September 29, 2008	Catalina	CSS	NYS	1.2 km	MPC · JPL
349575	2008 SD_{243}	—	September 29, 2008	Kitt Peak	Spacewatch	·	3.7 km	MPC · JPL
349576	2008 SR_{259}	—	September 23, 2008	Mount Lemmon	Mount Lemmon Survey	NYS	1.0 km	MPC · JPL
349577	2008 SJ_{263}	—	September 24, 2008	Kitt Peak	Spacewatch	·	760 m	MPC · JPL
349578	2008 SC_{265}	—	September 26, 2008	Kitt Peak	Spacewatch	VER	3.2 km	MPC · JPL
349579	2008 SM_{268}	—	March 13, 2007	Mount Lemmon	Mount Lemmon Survey	NYS	1.3 km	MPC · JPL
349580	2008 ST_{269}	—	September 22, 2008	Mount Lemmon	Mount Lemmon Survey	·	1.8 km	MPC · JPL
349581	2008 SO_{279}	—	September 23, 2008	Kitt Peak	Spacewatch	·	1.1 km	MPC · JPL
349582	2008 SL_{280}	—	September 22, 2008	Socorro	LINEAR	V	880 m	MPC · JPL
349583	2008 SD_{281}	—	September 27, 2008	Mount Lemmon	Mount Lemmon Survey	·	1.6 km	MPC · JPL
349584	2008 SO_{285}	—	September 21, 2008	Mount Lemmon	Mount Lemmon Survey	V	670 m	MPC · JPL
349585	2008 SU_{294}	—	September 22, 2008	Catalina	CSS	·	1.1 km	MPC · JPL
349586	2008 TQ_{5}	—	October 1, 2008	La Sagra	OAM	·	1.3 km	MPC · JPL
349587	2008 TT_{7}	—	October 3, 2008	La Sagra	OAM	V	660 m	MPC · JPL
349588	2008 TZ_{9}	—	October 4, 2008	La Sagra	OAM	·	1.8 km	MPC · JPL
349589	2008 TW_{10}	—	September 2, 2008	Kitt Peak	Spacewatch	·	3.0 km	MPC · JPL
349590	2008 TL_{18}	—	October 1, 2008	Mount Lemmon	Mount Lemmon Survey	MAS	680 m	MPC · JPL
349591	2008 TH_{26}	—	September 23, 2008	Catalina	CSS	H	790 m	MPC · JPL
349592	2008 TJ_{48}	—	October 2, 2008	Kitt Peak	Spacewatch	L4	10 km	MPC · JPL
349593	2008 TG_{61}	—	October 2, 2008	Kitt Peak	Spacewatch	·	840 m	MPC · JPL
349594	2008 TX_{69}	—	October 2, 2008	Kitt Peak	Spacewatch	·	1.3 km	MPC · JPL
349595	2008 TA_{70}	—	October 2, 2008	Kitt Peak	Spacewatch	NYS	1.1 km	MPC · JPL
349596	2008 TE_{93}	—	October 5, 2008	La Sagra	OAM	V	790 m	MPC · JPL
349597	2008 TF_{95}	—	October 6, 2008	Kitt Peak	Spacewatch	·	1.1 km	MPC · JPL
349598	2008 TT_{113}	—	October 6, 2008	Kitt Peak	Spacewatch	·	1.3 km	MPC · JPL
349599	2008 TS_{117}	—	October 6, 2008	Kitt Peak	Spacewatch	·	1.2 km	MPC · JPL
349600	2008 TJ_{131}	—	October 8, 2008	Mount Lemmon	Mount Lemmon Survey	PHO	1.0 km	MPC · JPL

== 349601–349700 ==
back to top

Designation			Discovery			Properties		Ref
Permanent	Provisional	Named after	Date	Site	Discoverer(s)	Category	Diam.	Ref
349601	2008 TY_{140}	—	October 9, 2008	Mount Lemmon	Mount Lemmon Survey	·	1.7 km	MPC · JPL
349602	2008 TB_{187}	—	October 8, 2008	Kitt Peak	Spacewatch	·	1.7 km	MPC · JPL
349603	2008 TH_{189}	—	October 10, 2008	Mount Lemmon	Mount Lemmon Survey	·	1.1 km	MPC · JPL
349604	2008 UL_{1}	—	October 20, 2008	Goodricke-Pigott	R. A. Tucker	·	3.4 km	MPC · JPL
349605	2008 UZ_{3}	—	October 23, 2008	Bergisch Gladbach	W. Bickel	MAS	800 m	MPC · JPL
349606 Fleurance	2008 UX_{5}	Fleurance	October 26, 2008	Vicques	M. Ory	NYS	1.5 km	MPC · JPL
349607	2008 US_{15}	—	October 18, 2008	Kitt Peak	Spacewatch	·	870 m	MPC · JPL
349608	2008 UU_{22}	—	October 19, 2008	Kitt Peak	Spacewatch	·	1.2 km	MPC · JPL
349609	2008 UF_{23}	—	October 20, 2008	Kitt Peak	Spacewatch	AGN	1.2 km	MPC · JPL
349610	2008 UK_{42}	—	October 20, 2008	Kitt Peak	Spacewatch	·	1.0 km	MPC · JPL
349611	2008 UV_{51}	—	October 20, 2008	Kitt Peak	Spacewatch	·	1.1 km	MPC · JPL
349612	2008 UH_{56}	—	October 21, 2008	Kitt Peak	Spacewatch	·	1.7 km	MPC · JPL
349613	2008 UA_{66}	—	October 21, 2008	Kitt Peak	Spacewatch	·	1.5 km	MPC · JPL
349614	2008 UB_{67}	—	October 21, 2008	Kitt Peak	Spacewatch	·	1.7 km	MPC · JPL
349615	2008 UX_{74}	—	October 21, 2008	Kitt Peak	Spacewatch	·	1.5 km	MPC · JPL
349616	2008 UH_{82}	—	October 22, 2008	Mount Lemmon	Mount Lemmon Survey	·	810 m	MPC · JPL
349617	2008 UD_{98}	—	October 26, 2008	Socorro	LINEAR	NYS	1.2 km	MPC · JPL
349618	2008 UY_{101}	—	October 20, 2008	Kitt Peak	Spacewatch	·	1.6 km	MPC · JPL
349619	2008 UK_{112}	—	October 22, 2008	Kitt Peak	Spacewatch	V	870 m	MPC · JPL
349620	2008 UY_{116}	—	October 22, 2008	Kitt Peak	Spacewatch	·	1.5 km	MPC · JPL
349621	2008 UU_{132}	—	October 23, 2008	Kitt Peak	Spacewatch	·	1.6 km	MPC · JPL
349622	2008 UH_{141}	—	October 23, 2008	Kitt Peak	Spacewatch	·	1.3 km	MPC · JPL
349623	2008 UX_{143}	—	October 23, 2008	Kitt Peak	Spacewatch	·	1.1 km	MPC · JPL
349624	2008 UQ_{148}	—	October 8, 2004	Kitt Peak	Spacewatch	·	1.6 km	MPC · JPL
349625	2008 UA_{151}	—	October 23, 2008	Kitt Peak	Spacewatch	V	730 m	MPC · JPL
349626	2008 UD_{151}	—	October 23, 2008	Kitt Peak	Spacewatch	·	1.7 km	MPC · JPL
349627	2008 UY_{153}	—	October 23, 2008	Kitt Peak	Spacewatch	·	1.2 km	MPC · JPL
349628	2008 UK_{156}	—	October 23, 2008	Kitt Peak	Spacewatch	·	1.1 km	MPC · JPL
349629	2008 UN_{160}	—	October 23, 2008	Kitt Peak	Spacewatch	·	1.5 km	MPC · JPL
349630	2008 UH_{163}	—	October 24, 2008	Kitt Peak	Spacewatch	MAR	810 m	MPC · JPL
349631	2008 UV_{169}	—	October 24, 2008	Catalina	CSS	V	760 m	MPC · JPL
349632	2008 UQ_{178}	—	October 24, 2008	Mount Lemmon	Mount Lemmon Survey	·	1.1 km	MPC · JPL
349633	2008 UG_{182}	—	October 24, 2008	Mount Lemmon	Mount Lemmon Survey	·	1.1 km	MPC · JPL
349634	2008 UU_{185}	—	October 24, 2008	Kitt Peak	Spacewatch	·	1 km	MPC · JPL
349635	2008 UJ_{192}	—	October 25, 2008	Catalina	CSS	·	1.3 km	MPC · JPL
349636	2008 UG_{198}	—	October 25, 2008	Socorro	LINEAR	PHO	2.9 km	MPC · JPL
349637	2008 UF_{210}	—	October 23, 2008	Kitt Peak	Spacewatch	·	760 m	MPC · JPL
349638	2008 UP_{216}	—	October 24, 2008	Mount Lemmon	Mount Lemmon Survey	·	3.7 km	MPC · JPL
349639	2008 UO_{225}	—	October 25, 2008	Kitt Peak	Spacewatch	·	1.5 km	MPC · JPL
349640	2008 UA_{248}	—	October 26, 2008	Kitt Peak	Spacewatch	·	1.0 km	MPC · JPL
349641	2008 UB_{248}	—	October 26, 2008	Kitt Peak	Spacewatch	·	1.3 km	MPC · JPL
349642	2008 US_{250}	—	October 27, 2008	Kitt Peak	Spacewatch	MAS	750 m	MPC · JPL
349643	2008 UW_{256}	—	October 27, 2008	Kitt Peak	Spacewatch	NYS	1.3 km	MPC · JPL
349644	2008 UG_{260}	—	October 7, 2008	Mount Lemmon	Mount Lemmon Survey	·	1.4 km	MPC · JPL
349645	2008 UJ_{270}	—	October 28, 2008	Kitt Peak	Spacewatch	·	1.2 km	MPC · JPL
349646	2008 UW_{281}	—	October 28, 2008	Kitt Peak	Spacewatch	(5)	1.1 km	MPC · JPL
349647	2008 UT_{294}	—	October 29, 2008	Kitt Peak	Spacewatch	·	1.4 km	MPC · JPL
349648	2008 US_{303}	—	October 29, 2008	Kitt Peak	Spacewatch	·	1.3 km	MPC · JPL
349649	2008 UF_{305}	—	October 29, 2008	Mount Lemmon	Mount Lemmon Survey	·	1.9 km	MPC · JPL
349650	2008 UN_{315}	—	October 30, 2008	Mount Lemmon	Mount Lemmon Survey	EOS	2.4 km	MPC · JPL
349651	2008 UT_{331}	—	October 3, 2008	Mount Lemmon	Mount Lemmon Survey	·	2.0 km	MPC · JPL
349652	2008 UR_{335}	—	October 20, 2008	Kitt Peak	Spacewatch	·	1.6 km	MPC · JPL
349653	2008 UZ_{346}	—	October 30, 2008	Kitt Peak	Spacewatch	·	1.9 km	MPC · JPL
349654	2008 UB_{353}	—	October 21, 2008	Kitt Peak	Spacewatch	·	1.5 km	MPC · JPL
349655	2008 VD_{7}	—	November 1, 2008	Catalina	CSS	·	900 m	MPC · JPL
349656	2008 VD_{9}	—	November 2, 2008	Mount Lemmon	Mount Lemmon Survey	·	1.4 km	MPC · JPL
349657	2008 VD_{21}	—	November 1, 2008	Mount Lemmon	Mount Lemmon Survey	NYS	1.1 km	MPC · JPL
349658	2008 VR_{33}	—	November 2, 2008	Mount Lemmon	Mount Lemmon Survey	·	1.6 km	MPC · JPL
349659	2008 VK_{47}	—	November 3, 2008	Catalina	CSS	·	2.6 km	MPC · JPL
349660	2008 VO_{48}	—	November 3, 2008	Kitt Peak	Spacewatch	·	1.8 km	MPC · JPL
349661	2008 VS_{48}	—	November 3, 2008	Kitt Peak	Spacewatch	·	980 m	MPC · JPL
349662	2008 VL_{57}	—	November 6, 2008	Mount Lemmon	Mount Lemmon Survey	·	1.6 km	MPC · JPL
349663	2008 VZ_{68}	—	November 8, 2008	Mount Lemmon	Mount Lemmon Survey	·	2.0 km	MPC · JPL
349664	2008 VR_{70}	—	November 7, 2008	Mount Lemmon	Mount Lemmon Survey	·	1.7 km	MPC · JPL
349665	2008 VL_{74}	—	November 8, 2008	Mount Lemmon	Mount Lemmon Survey	EUN	1.4 km	MPC · JPL
349666	2008 VC_{80}	—	November 1, 2008	Mount Lemmon	Mount Lemmon Survey	EUN	2.0 km	MPC · JPL
349667	2008 WN_{10}	—	November 18, 2008	La Sagra	OAM	·	1.3 km	MPC · JPL
349668	2008 WH_{11}	—	November 18, 2008	Catalina	CSS	·	1.7 km	MPC · JPL
349669	2008 WA_{32}	—	November 19, 2008	Mount Lemmon	Mount Lemmon Survey	·	1.0 km	MPC · JPL
349670	2008 WF_{59}	—	November 22, 2008	Pla D'Arguines	R. Ferrando	·	1.4 km	MPC · JPL
349671	2008 WY_{66}	—	November 18, 2008	Kitt Peak	Spacewatch	·	1.2 km	MPC · JPL
349672	2008 WR_{68}	—	November 18, 2008	Kitt Peak	Spacewatch	V	840 m	MPC · JPL
349673	2008 WB_{74}	—	November 19, 2008	Mount Lemmon	Mount Lemmon Survey	·	1.9 km	MPC · JPL
349674	2008 WH_{76}	—	November 20, 2008	Kitt Peak	Spacewatch	MIS	2.0 km	MPC · JPL
349675	2008 WD_{77}	—	September 29, 2008	Mount Lemmon	Mount Lemmon Survey	·	1.5 km	MPC · JPL
349676	2008 WZ_{79}	—	November 20, 2008	Kitt Peak	Spacewatch	·	2.0 km	MPC · JPL
349677	2008 WF_{82}	—	November 20, 2008	Kitt Peak	Spacewatch	·	1.6 km	MPC · JPL
349678	2008 WO_{83}	—	November 20, 2008	Kitt Peak	Spacewatch	ERI	2.5 km	MPC · JPL
349679	2008 WE_{88}	—	November 21, 2008	Mount Lemmon	Mount Lemmon Survey	·	2.7 km	MPC · JPL
349680	2008 WU_{88}	—	November 21, 2008	Kitt Peak	Spacewatch	·	1.0 km	MPC · JPL
349681	2008 WE_{89}	—	November 21, 2008	Mount Lemmon	Mount Lemmon Survey	·	3.7 km	MPC · JPL
349682	2008 WC_{90}	—	November 22, 2008	Mount Lemmon	Mount Lemmon Survey	·	1.9 km	MPC · JPL
349683	2008 WP_{90}	—	November 22, 2008	Mount Lemmon	Mount Lemmon Survey	·	2.8 km	MPC · JPL
349684	2008 WY_{98}	—	November 24, 2008	La Sagra	OAM	·	3.2 km	MPC · JPL
349685	2008 WA_{108}	—	November 30, 2008	Catalina	CSS	·	1.8 km	MPC · JPL
349686	2008 WS_{110}	—	November 30, 2008	Kitt Peak	Spacewatch	·	1.5 km	MPC · JPL
349687	2008 WD_{113}	—	November 30, 2008	Kitt Peak	Spacewatch	·	1.0 km	MPC · JPL
349688	2008 WN_{115}	—	November 30, 2008	Kitt Peak	Spacewatch	·	1.6 km	MPC · JPL
349689	2008 WP_{118}	—	November 30, 2008	Mount Lemmon	Mount Lemmon Survey	·	1.8 km	MPC · JPL
349690	2008 WG_{127}	—	November 19, 2008	Socorro	LINEAR	V	840 m	MPC · JPL
349691	2008 WC_{136}	—	November 19, 2008	Kitt Peak	Spacewatch	·	1.6 km	MPC · JPL
349692	2008 WX_{139}	—	November 21, 2008	Mount Lemmon	Mount Lemmon Survey	·	2.8 km	MPC · JPL
349693	2008 XS_{2}	—	December 6, 2008	Mount Lemmon	Mount Lemmon Survey	·	2.3 km	MPC · JPL
349694	2008 XF_{3}	—	December 7, 2008	Mount Lemmon	Mount Lemmon Survey	·	2.0 km	MPC · JPL
349695	2008 XA_{4}	—	December 2, 2008	Socorro	LINEAR	EUN	1.7 km	MPC · JPL
349696	2008 XS_{4}	—	December 3, 2008	Socorro	LINEAR	MAR	1.7 km	MPC · JPL
349697	2008 XC_{11}	—	December 1, 2008	Catalina	CSS	·	1.2 km	MPC · JPL
349698	2008 XV_{21}	—	December 1, 2008	Kitt Peak	Spacewatch	·	1.9 km	MPC · JPL
349699	2008 XW_{22}	—	December 3, 2008	Kitt Peak	Spacewatch	·	1.6 km	MPC · JPL
349700	2008 XG_{34}	—	August 10, 2007	Kitt Peak	Spacewatch	fast	1.1 km	MPC · JPL

== 349701–349800 ==
back to top

Designation			Discovery			Properties		Ref
Permanent	Provisional	Named after	Date	Site	Discoverer(s)	Category	Diam.	Ref
349701	2008 XR_{37}	—	December 2, 2008	Kitt Peak	Spacewatch	RAF	940 m	MPC · JPL
349702	2008 XJ_{46}	—	December 4, 2008	Mount Lemmon	Mount Lemmon Survey	·	1.4 km	MPC · JPL
349703	2008 XW_{50}	—	December 4, 2008	Mount Lemmon	Mount Lemmon Survey	MAS	950 m	MPC · JPL
349704	2008 XH_{51}	—	December 3, 2008	Socorro	LINEAR	·	1.3 km	MPC · JPL
349705	2008 XX_{51}	—	December 3, 2008	Catalina	CSS	·	2.3 km	MPC · JPL
349706	2008 XF_{52}	—	December 4, 2008	Catalina	CSS	·	4.7 km	MPC · JPL
349707	2008 YU_{2}	—	December 21, 2008	Mayhill	Lowe, A.	·	1.6 km	MPC · JPL
349708	2008 YY_{2}	—	December 1, 2008	Catalina	CSS	·	1.7 km	MPC · JPL
349709	2008 YY_{3}	—	November 19, 2003	Kitt Peak	Spacewatch	·	1.5 km	MPC · JPL
349710	2008 YP_{5}	—	December 22, 2008	Marly	P. Kocher	·	2.4 km	MPC · JPL
349711	2008 YM_{8}	—	April 4, 2002	Kitt Peak	Spacewatch	MAS	840 m	MPC · JPL
349712	2008 YP_{8}	—	December 24, 2008	Weihai	University, Shandong	NYS	1.3 km	MPC · JPL
349713	2008 YQ_{9}	—	December 25, 2008	Weihai	University, Shandong	·	1.2 km	MPC · JPL
349714	2008 YF_{11}	—	November 19, 2008	Kitt Peak	Spacewatch	·	1.5 km	MPC · JPL
349715	2008 YT_{16}	—	December 21, 2008	Mount Lemmon	Mount Lemmon Survey	·	1.6 km	MPC · JPL
349716	2008 YO_{26}	—	December 24, 2008	Dauban	Kugel, F.	·	1.5 km	MPC · JPL
349717	2008 YS_{28}	—	December 29, 2008	Piszkéstető	K. Sárneczky	·	1.2 km	MPC · JPL
349718	2008 YF_{37}	—	December 22, 2008	Kitt Peak	Spacewatch	·	2.9 km	MPC · JPL
349719	2008 YB_{40}	—	December 29, 2008	Kitt Peak	Spacewatch	MAS	1 km	MPC · JPL
349720	2008 YB_{44}	—	December 29, 2008	Kitt Peak	Spacewatch	·	1.8 km	MPC · JPL
349721	2008 YJ_{45}	—	December 29, 2008	Mount Lemmon	Mount Lemmon Survey	·	2.2 km	MPC · JPL
349722	2008 YE_{50}	—	December 29, 2008	Mount Lemmon	Mount Lemmon Survey	·	2.3 km	MPC · JPL
349723	2008 YR_{52}	—	December 29, 2008	Mount Lemmon	Mount Lemmon Survey	·	1.7 km	MPC · JPL
349724	2008 YP_{62}	—	December 30, 2008	Mount Lemmon	Mount Lemmon Survey	WIT	900 m	MPC · JPL
349725	2008 YK_{65}	—	December 30, 2008	Catalina	CSS	·	2.1 km	MPC · JPL
349726	2008 YH_{68}	—	December 4, 2008	Mount Lemmon	Mount Lemmon Survey	·	1.5 km	MPC · JPL
349727	2008 YM_{69}	—	December 29, 2008	Kitt Peak	Spacewatch	·	1.3 km	MPC · JPL
349728	2008 YF_{70}	—	December 29, 2008	Mount Lemmon	Mount Lemmon Survey	HNS	1.6 km	MPC · JPL
349729	2008 YF_{80}	—	December 30, 2008	Mount Lemmon	Mount Lemmon Survey	AGN	1.3 km	MPC · JPL
349730	2008 YV_{80}	—	December 30, 2008	Kitt Peak	Spacewatch	·	1.4 km	MPC · JPL
349731	2008 YS_{86}	—	December 29, 2008	Kitt Peak	Spacewatch	MIS	1.9 km	MPC · JPL
349732	2008 YB_{93}	—	December 29, 2008	Kitt Peak	Spacewatch	·	1.1 km	MPC · JPL
349733	2008 YW_{97}	—	December 29, 2008	Mount Lemmon	Mount Lemmon Survey	NEM	2.3 km	MPC · JPL
349734	2008 YH_{104}	—	December 29, 2008	Kitt Peak	Spacewatch	·	1.6 km	MPC · JPL
349735	2008 YU_{105}	—	December 29, 2008	Kitt Peak	Spacewatch	·	1.5 km	MPC · JPL
349736	2008 YF_{109}	—	December 29, 2008	Kitt Peak	Spacewatch	·	1.5 km	MPC · JPL
349737	2008 YU_{109}	—	December 30, 2008	Kitt Peak	Spacewatch	·	1.4 km	MPC · JPL
349738	2008 YB_{110}	—	December 30, 2008	Kitt Peak	Spacewatch	HOF	3.0 km	MPC · JPL
349739	2008 YJ_{117}	—	December 29, 2008	Mount Lemmon	Mount Lemmon Survey	WIT	1.1 km	MPC · JPL
349740	2008 YJ_{126}	—	December 30, 2008	Kitt Peak	Spacewatch	·	2.6 km	MPC · JPL
349741	2008 YM_{130}	—	December 31, 2008	Kitt Peak	Spacewatch	·	1.8 km	MPC · JPL
349742	2008 YV_{131}	—	December 31, 2008	Kitt Peak	Spacewatch	·	1.3 km	MPC · JPL
349743	2008 YB_{134}	—	December 30, 2008	Kitt Peak	Spacewatch	(5)	1.0 km	MPC · JPL
349744	2008 YH_{134}	—	December 30, 2008	Kitt Peak	Spacewatch	MAS	800 m	MPC · JPL
349745	2008 YG_{140}	—	December 30, 2008	Mount Lemmon	Mount Lemmon Survey	·	1.3 km	MPC · JPL
349746	2008 YG_{145}	—	December 30, 2008	Kitt Peak	Spacewatch	·	2.1 km	MPC · JPL
349747	2008 YL_{146}	—	December 30, 2008	Kitt Peak	Spacewatch	JUN	1.2 km	MPC · JPL
349748	2008 YD_{151}	—	December 22, 2008	Mount Lemmon	Mount Lemmon Survey	AGN	1.3 km	MPC · JPL
349749	2008 YJ_{155}	—	December 22, 2008	Kitt Peak	Spacewatch	·	1.7 km	MPC · JPL
349750	2008 YZ_{155}	—	December 22, 2008	Catalina	CSS	·	2.0 km	MPC · JPL
349751	2008 YQ_{156}	—	December 30, 2008	Mount Lemmon	Mount Lemmon Survey	·	1.9 km	MPC · JPL
349752	2008 YP_{157}	—	December 21, 2008	Mount Lemmon	Mount Lemmon Survey	AGN	1.4 km	MPC · JPL
349753	2008 YD_{167}	—	September 10, 2004	Kitt Peak	Spacewatch	NYS	1.4 km	MPC · JPL
349754	2008 YP_{171}	—	December 31, 2008	Socorro	LINEAR	·	1.8 km	MPC · JPL
349755	2009 AE_{2}	—	January 4, 2009	Weihai	University, Shandong	V	1.1 km	MPC · JPL
349756	2009 AV_{7}	—	October 25, 2008	Mount Lemmon	Mount Lemmon Survey	·	1.7 km	MPC · JPL
349757	2009 AA_{13}	—	January 2, 2009	Mount Lemmon	Mount Lemmon Survey	·	1.6 km	MPC · JPL
349758	2009 AM_{13}	—	January 2, 2009	Mount Lemmon	Mount Lemmon Survey	·	2.7 km	MPC · JPL
349759	2009 AR_{17}	—	January 2, 2009	Kitt Peak	Spacewatch	·	1.5 km	MPC · JPL
349760	2009 AY_{19}	—	January 2, 2009	Mount Lemmon	Mount Lemmon Survey	·	2.0 km	MPC · JPL
349761	2009 AR_{22}	—	January 3, 2009	Kitt Peak	Spacewatch	·	2.2 km	MPC · JPL
349762	2009 AL_{25}	—	January 2, 2009	Kitt Peak	Spacewatch	MAS	950 m	MPC · JPL
349763	2009 AS_{27}	—	January 2, 2009	Kitt Peak	Spacewatch	EUN	1.4 km	MPC · JPL
349764	2009 AY_{28}	—	January 8, 2009	Kitt Peak	Spacewatch	·	1.4 km	MPC · JPL
349765	2009 AR_{37}	—	January 15, 2009	Kitt Peak	Spacewatch	·	1.7 km	MPC · JPL
349766	2009 AH_{43}	—	January 7, 2009	Wrightwood	J. W. Young	(5)	1.4 km	MPC · JPL
349767	2009 BD_{1}	—	January 17, 2009	Calar Alto	F. Hormuth	PAD	1.6 km	MPC · JPL
349768	2009 BL_{1}	—	January 17, 2009	Socorro	LINEAR	·	1.7 km	MPC · JPL
349769	2009 BJ_{6}	—	January 18, 2009	Socorro	LINEAR	·	2.4 km	MPC · JPL
349770	2009 BW_{7}	—	January 21, 2009	Mayhill	Lowe, A.	(1547)	1.6 km	MPC · JPL
349771	2009 BF_{8}	—	January 17, 2009	Socorro	LINEAR	·	2.4 km	MPC · JPL
349772	2009 BW_{8}	—	January 17, 2009	Socorro	LINEAR	·	1.9 km	MPC · JPL
349773	2009 BP_{9}	—	January 18, 2009	Socorro	LINEAR	·	2.2 km	MPC · JPL
349774	2009 BG_{10}	—	January 21, 2009	Great Shefford	Birtwhistle, P.	·	1.8 km	MPC · JPL
349775	2009 BW_{14}	—	January 16, 2009	Kitt Peak	Spacewatch	·	2.3 km	MPC · JPL
349776	2009 BV_{15}	—	January 16, 2009	Mount Lemmon	Mount Lemmon Survey	·	2.6 km	MPC · JPL
349777	2009 BS_{17}	—	January 16, 2009	Mount Lemmon	Mount Lemmon Survey	·	1.2 km	MPC · JPL
349778	2009 BQ_{30}	—	January 16, 2009	Kitt Peak	Spacewatch	NEM	2.4 km	MPC · JPL
349779	2009 BK_{34}	—	January 16, 2009	Kitt Peak	Spacewatch	·	1.2 km	MPC · JPL
349780	2009 BZ_{35}	—	January 16, 2009	Kitt Peak	Spacewatch	·	1.8 km	MPC · JPL
349781	2009 BX_{42}	—	January 16, 2009	Kitt Peak	Spacewatch	·	1.3 km	MPC · JPL
349782	2009 BN_{45}	—	January 16, 2009	Kitt Peak	Spacewatch	HOF	2.6 km	MPC · JPL
349783	2009 BR_{49}	—	January 16, 2009	Mount Lemmon	Mount Lemmon Survey	AGN	1.2 km	MPC · JPL
349784	2009 BA_{54}	—	January 16, 2009	Mount Lemmon	Mount Lemmon Survey	·	4.2 km	MPC · JPL
349785 Hsiaotejen	2009 BP_{55}	Hsiaotejen	January 16, 2009	Lulin	Hsiao, H.-Y., Q. Ye	·	2.2 km	MPC · JPL
349786	2009 BP_{60}	—	January 17, 2009	Kitt Peak	Spacewatch	EUN	1.7 km	MPC · JPL
349787	2009 BB_{62}	—	January 18, 2009	Mount Lemmon	Mount Lemmon Survey	AGN	1.1 km	MPC · JPL
349788	2009 BZ_{62}	—	January 20, 2009	Catalina	CSS	ADE	2.1 km	MPC · JPL
349789	2009 BA_{64}	—	January 20, 2009	Catalina	CSS	·	1.5 km	MPC · JPL
349790	2009 BM_{68}	—	January 23, 2009	Purple Mountain	PMO NEO Survey Program	MIS	2.6 km	MPC · JPL
349791	2009 BO_{69}	—	January 25, 2009	Catalina	CSS	·	2.5 km	MPC · JPL
349792	2009 BO_{70}	—	January 25, 2009	Catalina	CSS	·	1.9 km	MPC · JPL
349793	2009 BX_{73}	—	January 16, 2009	Mount Lemmon	Mount Lemmon Survey	·	1.4 km	MPC · JPL
349794	2009 BD_{74}	—	January 17, 2009	Kitt Peak	Spacewatch	·	1.7 km	MPC · JPL
349795	2009 BV_{76}	—	January 27, 2009	Purple Mountain	PMO NEO Survey Program	·	2.3 km	MPC · JPL
349796	2009 BK_{80}	—	January 31, 2009	Socorro	LINEAR	(5)	1.5 km	MPC · JPL
349797	2009 BK_{82}	—	September 30, 2003	Apache Point	SDSS	·	1.5 km	MPC · JPL
349798	2009 BQ_{87}	—	January 25, 2009	Kitt Peak	Spacewatch	·	2.6 km	MPC · JPL
349799	2009 BD_{88}	—	January 25, 2009	Kitt Peak	Spacewatch	NEM	2.5 km	MPC · JPL
349800	2009 BN_{89}	—	January 25, 2009	Kitt Peak	Spacewatch	·	2.2 km	MPC · JPL

== 349801–349900 ==
back to top

Designation			Discovery			Properties		Ref
Permanent	Provisional	Named after	Date	Site	Discoverer(s)	Category	Diam.	Ref
349801	2009 BL_{94}	—	January 25, 2009	Kitt Peak	Spacewatch	·	1.3 km	MPC · JPL
349802	2009 BJ_{95}	—	January 26, 2009	Mount Lemmon	Mount Lemmon Survey	·	2.0 km	MPC · JPL
349803	2009 BL_{99}	—	January 28, 2009	Catalina	CSS	·	2.2 km	MPC · JPL
349804	2009 BM_{99}	—	January 28, 2009	Catalina	CSS	·	790 m	MPC · JPL
349805	2009 BR_{106}	—	January 27, 2009	Purple Mountain	PMO NEO Survey Program	·	2.1 km	MPC · JPL
349806	2009 BE_{110}	—	January 31, 2009	Mount Lemmon	Mount Lemmon Survey	·	2.1 km	MPC · JPL
349807	2009 BQ_{110}	—	January 31, 2009	Mount Lemmon	Mount Lemmon Survey	·	2.7 km	MPC · JPL
349808	2009 BS_{116}	—	January 29, 2009	Catalina	CSS	·	1.2 km	MPC · JPL
349809	2009 BB_{122}	—	January 31, 2009	Kitt Peak	Spacewatch	·	1.8 km	MPC · JPL
349810	2009 BR_{131}	—	January 27, 2009	Purple Mountain	PMO NEO Survey Program	·	2.2 km	MPC · JPL
349811	2009 BT_{131}	—	January 18, 2009	Catalina	CSS	·	2.4 km	MPC · JPL
349812	2009 BA_{141}	—	January 30, 2009	Kitt Peak	Spacewatch	·	2.3 km	MPC · JPL
349813	2009 BH_{145}	—	January 30, 2009	Kitt Peak	Spacewatch	AGN	1.1 km	MPC · JPL
349814	2009 BL_{157}	—	January 31, 2009	Kitt Peak	Spacewatch	·	3.1 km	MPC · JPL
349815	2009 BF_{158}	—	January 31, 2009	Kitt Peak	Spacewatch	·	2.3 km	MPC · JPL
349816	2009 BR_{163}	—	January 31, 2009	Kitt Peak	Spacewatch	·	1.6 km	MPC · JPL
349817	2009 BY_{165}	—	January 31, 2009	Kitt Peak	Spacewatch	·	1.2 km	MPC · JPL
349818	2009 BC_{170}	—	January 16, 2009	Kitt Peak	Spacewatch	(12739)	1.8 km	MPC · JPL
349819	2009 BU_{174}	—	January 25, 2009	Kitt Peak	Spacewatch	KOR	1.4 km	MPC · JPL
349820	2009 BA_{176}	—	January 31, 2009	Mount Lemmon	Mount Lemmon Survey	·	2.2 km	MPC · JPL
349821	2009 BG_{180}	—	January 20, 2009	Mount Lemmon	Mount Lemmon Survey	·	2.6 km	MPC · JPL
349822	2009 BU_{181}	—	January 26, 2009	Catalina	CSS	·	2.1 km	MPC · JPL
349823	2009 BM_{184}	—	January 17, 2009	Socorro	LINEAR	·	1.4 km	MPC · JPL
349824	2009 BJ_{186}	—	January 18, 2009	Kitt Peak	Spacewatch	·	2.2 km	MPC · JPL
349825	2009 BO_{186}	—	January 18, 2009	Kitt Peak	Spacewatch	·	2.4 km	MPC · JPL
349826	2009 CU_{6}	—	February 14, 2009	Heppenheim	Starkenburg	KOR	1.3 km	MPC · JPL
349827	2009 CM_{7}	—	February 1, 2009	Catalina	CSS	·	1.5 km	MPC · JPL
349828	2009 CU_{11}	—	February 1, 2009	Kitt Peak	Spacewatch	·	1.5 km	MPC · JPL
349829	2009 CY_{14}	—	February 3, 2009	Kitt Peak	Spacewatch	·	1.4 km	MPC · JPL
349830	2009 CO_{15}	—	February 3, 2009	Mount Lemmon	Mount Lemmon Survey	HOF	2.5 km	MPC · JPL
349831	2009 CW_{18}	—	February 3, 2009	Mount Lemmon	Mount Lemmon Survey	ADE	2.2 km	MPC · JPL
349832	2009 CV_{19}	—	February 4, 2009	Mount Lemmon	Mount Lemmon Survey	·	2.0 km	MPC · JPL
349833	2009 CJ_{22}	—	February 1, 2009	Kitt Peak	Spacewatch	·	2.3 km	MPC · JPL
349834	2009 CB_{23}	—	February 1, 2009	Kitt Peak	Spacewatch	·	2.2 km	MPC · JPL
349835	2009 CY_{25}	—	February 1, 2009	Kitt Peak	Spacewatch	AEO	970 m	MPC · JPL
349836	2009 CF_{26}	—	February 1, 2009	Kitt Peak	Spacewatch	·	1.3 km	MPC · JPL
349837	2009 CU_{33}	—	February 2, 2009	Kitt Peak	Spacewatch	·	2.1 km	MPC · JPL
349838	2009 CX_{36}	—	February 3, 2009	Kitt Peak	Spacewatch	KOR	1.6 km	MPC · JPL
349839	2009 CS_{37}	—	February 4, 2009	Kitt Peak	Spacewatch	·	3.5 km	MPC · JPL
349840	2009 CF_{43}	—	February 14, 2009	Catalina	CSS	DOR	2.7 km	MPC · JPL
349841	2009 CX_{48}	—	February 14, 2009	Mount Lemmon	Mount Lemmon Survey	·	1.5 km	MPC · JPL
349842	2009 CV_{49}	—	February 14, 2009	Mount Lemmon	Mount Lemmon Survey	·	1.1 km	MPC · JPL
349843	2009 CE_{52}	—	February 14, 2009	Mount Lemmon	Mount Lemmon Survey	·	1.7 km	MPC · JPL
349844	2009 CC_{55}	—	November 19, 2003	Anderson Mesa	LONEOS	·	1.9 km	MPC · JPL
349845	2009 CY_{55}	—	November 23, 2008	Mount Lemmon	Mount Lemmon Survey	·	1.9 km	MPC · JPL
349846	2009 CO_{59}	—	February 5, 2009	Catalina	CSS	·	3.2 km	MPC · JPL
349847	2009 CS_{61}	—	February 4, 2009	Mount Lemmon	Mount Lemmon Survey	·	4.4 km	MPC · JPL
349848	2009 CT_{62}	—	February 1, 2009	Kitt Peak	Spacewatch	·	1.8 km	MPC · JPL
349849	2009 CF_{63}	—	February 1, 2009	Socorro	LINEAR	·	2.4 km	MPC · JPL
349850	2009 CR_{65}	—	February 2, 2009	Kitt Peak	Spacewatch	·	2.2 km	MPC · JPL
349851	2009 DA_{2}	—	January 31, 2009	Kitt Peak	Spacewatch	·	3.5 km	MPC · JPL
349852	2009 DN_{7}	—	February 19, 2009	Kitt Peak	Spacewatch	·	3.2 km	MPC · JPL
349853	2009 DX_{15}	—	February 16, 2009	La Sagra	OAM	·	1.6 km	MPC · JPL
349854	2009 DX_{18}	—	February 20, 2009	Kitt Peak	Spacewatch	·	2.4 km	MPC · JPL
349855	2009 DU_{19}	—	February 21, 2009	Catalina	CSS	EUN	1.6 km	MPC · JPL
349856	2009 DW_{19}	—	February 21, 2009	Catalina	CSS	·	2.2 km	MPC · JPL
349857	2009 DE_{21}	—	February 19, 2009	Kitt Peak	Spacewatch	·	2.3 km	MPC · JPL
349858	2009 DJ_{26}	—	February 18, 2009	Socorro	LINEAR	·	2.9 km	MPC · JPL
349859	2009 DJ_{35}	—	February 20, 2009	Kitt Peak	Spacewatch	·	3.4 km	MPC · JPL
349860	2009 DY_{35}	—	February 20, 2009	Kitt Peak	Spacewatch	EOS	2.3 km	MPC · JPL
349861	2009 DW_{41}	—	February 19, 2009	La Sagra	OAM	JUN	1.0 km	MPC · JPL
349862 Modigliani	2009 DX_{43}	Modigliani	February 21, 2009	Vallemare Borbona	V. S. Casulli	·	2.1 km	MPC · JPL
349863	2009 DS_{47}	—	February 28, 2009	Socorro	LINEAR	·	3.2 km	MPC · JPL
349864	2009 DQ_{50}	—	February 19, 2009	Kitt Peak	Spacewatch	·	2.9 km	MPC · JPL
349865	2009 DG_{53}	—	February 22, 2009	Kitt Peak	Spacewatch	·	1.6 km	MPC · JPL
349866	2009 DU_{56}	—	February 22, 2009	Kitt Peak	Spacewatch	EOS	2.4 km	MPC · JPL
349867	2009 DY_{57}	—	February 22, 2009	Kitt Peak	Spacewatch	·	2.7 km	MPC · JPL
349868	2009 DX_{59}	—	February 22, 2009	Kitt Peak	Spacewatch	·	1.9 km	MPC · JPL
349869	2009 DD_{62}	—	February 22, 2009	Kitt Peak	Spacewatch	·	3.8 km	MPC · JPL
349870	2009 DB_{63}	—	February 22, 2009	Kitt Peak	Spacewatch	·	2.6 km	MPC · JPL
349871	2009 DO_{65}	—	February 22, 2009	Catalina	CSS	·	2.3 km	MPC · JPL
349872	2009 DZ_{68}	—	February 26, 2009	Mount Lemmon	Mount Lemmon Survey	·	1.4 km	MPC · JPL
349873	2009 DC_{71}	—	February 17, 2009	La Sagra	OAM	·	1.5 km	MPC · JPL
349874	2009 DA_{74}	—	February 26, 2009	Catalina	CSS	·	2.1 km	MPC · JPL
349875	2009 DR_{76}	—	February 21, 2009	Mount Lemmon	Mount Lemmon Survey	·	2.1 km	MPC · JPL
349876	2009 DN_{78}	—	February 21, 2009	Kitt Peak	Spacewatch	·	2.1 km	MPC · JPL
349877	2009 DC_{81}	—	February 24, 2009	Kitt Peak	Spacewatch	·	3.0 km	MPC · JPL
349878	2009 DG_{81}	—	February 24, 2009	Kitt Peak	Spacewatch	·	1.5 km	MPC · JPL
349879	2009 DK_{81}	—	February 24, 2009	Kitt Peak	Spacewatch	·	2.1 km	MPC · JPL
349880	2009 DD_{84}	—	February 26, 2009	Kitt Peak	Spacewatch	·	3.0 km	MPC · JPL
349881	2009 DS_{84}	—	February 26, 2009	Kitt Peak	Spacewatch	·	2.1 km	MPC · JPL
349882	2009 DZ_{84}	—	October 20, 2006	Kitt Peak	Spacewatch	·	3.4 km	MPC · JPL
349883	2009 DJ_{87}	—	February 27, 2009	Catalina	CSS	·	2.3 km	MPC · JPL
349884	2009 DM_{109}	—	April 7, 2005	Mount Lemmon	Mount Lemmon Survey	·	2.4 km	MPC · JPL
349885	2009 DT_{118}	—	February 27, 2009	Kitt Peak	Spacewatch	·	2.1 km	MPC · JPL
349886	2009 DA_{125}	—	September 26, 2006	Kitt Peak	Spacewatch	·	2.2 km	MPC · JPL
349887	2009 DP_{125}	—	February 19, 2009	Kitt Peak	Spacewatch	·	3.2 km	MPC · JPL
349888	2009 DM_{126}	—	February 20, 2009	Kitt Peak	Spacewatch	·	2.1 km	MPC · JPL
349889	2009 DL_{129}	—	February 27, 2009	Kitt Peak	Spacewatch	TRE	2.3 km	MPC · JPL
349890	2009 DZ_{130}	—	February 22, 2009	Catalina	CSS	·	1.6 km	MPC · JPL
349891	2009 DE_{133}	—	February 27, 2009	Catalina	CSS	·	2.2 km	MPC · JPL
349892	2009 DM_{134}	—	February 28, 2009	Kitt Peak	Spacewatch	THM	4.0 km	MPC · JPL
349893	2009 DP_{136}	—	February 20, 2009	Kitt Peak	Spacewatch	·	3.1 km	MPC · JPL
349894	2009 EN_{12}	—	March 1, 2009	Mount Lemmon	Mount Lemmon Survey	EMA	3.5 km	MPC · JPL
349895	2009 ED_{30}	—	March 2, 2009	Kitt Peak	Spacewatch	·	2.8 km	MPC · JPL
349896	2009 FB_{23}	—	March 20, 2009	Bergisch Gladbach	W. Bickel	·	3.4 km	MPC · JPL
349897	2009 FM_{24}	—	March 20, 2009	La Sagra	OAM	·	2.9 km	MPC · JPL
349898	2009 FA_{28}	—	March 22, 2009	Catalina	CSS	·	3.1 km	MPC · JPL
349899	2009 FE_{32}	—	March 26, 2009	Cerro Burek	Burek, Cerro	·	5.0 km	MPC · JPL
349900	2009 FM_{34}	—	March 24, 2009	Kitt Peak	Spacewatch	·	2.5 km	MPC · JPL

== 349901–350000 ==
back to top

Designation			Discovery			Properties		Ref
Permanent	Provisional	Named after	Date	Site	Discoverer(s)	Category	Diam.	Ref
349901	2009 FX_{35}	—	March 24, 2009	Kitt Peak	Spacewatch	·	2.4 km	MPC · JPL
349902	2009 FU_{38}	—	March 17, 2009	Kitt Peak	Spacewatch	·	2.2 km	MPC · JPL
349903	2009 FS_{43}	—	March 30, 2009	Socorro	LINEAR	·	2.6 km	MPC · JPL
349904	2009 FZ_{43}	—	March 29, 2009	Bergisch Gladbach	W. Bickel	·	2.5 km	MPC · JPL
349905	2009 FP_{47}	—	March 28, 2009	Mount Lemmon	Mount Lemmon Survey	·	3.0 km	MPC · JPL
349906	2009 FD_{48}	—	March 25, 2009	Hibiscus	Teamo, N.	HOF	3.2 km	MPC · JPL
349907	2009 FV_{68}	—	March 31, 2009	Mount Lemmon	Mount Lemmon Survey	TIR	3.2 km	MPC · JPL
349908	2009 FN_{74}	—	March 17, 2009	Socorro	LINEAR	·	4.2 km	MPC · JPL
349909	2009 HD_{8}	—	April 17, 2009	Kitt Peak	Spacewatch	URS	3.9 km	MPC · JPL
349910	2009 HQ_{9}	—	April 17, 2009	Mount Lemmon	Mount Lemmon Survey	·	4.9 km	MPC · JPL
349911	2009 HT_{79}	—	April 27, 2009	Mount Lemmon	Mount Lemmon Survey	·	3.1 km	MPC · JPL
349912	2009 HN_{90}	—	April 20, 2009	Mount Lemmon	Mount Lemmon Survey	·	2.0 km	MPC · JPL
349913	2009 KX_{8}	—	May 24, 2009	Catalina	CSS	·	3.7 km	MPC · JPL
349914	2009 KX_{13}	—	May 26, 2009	Mount Lemmon	Mount Lemmon Survey	·	2.4 km	MPC · JPL
349915	2009 QA_{30}	—	August 20, 2009	Catalina	CSS	H	800 m	MPC · JPL
349916	2009 QE_{59}	—	August 28, 2009	Kitt Peak	Spacewatch	L4	10 km	MPC · JPL
349917	2009 RB_{14}	—	September 12, 2009	Kitt Peak	Spacewatch	·	3.8 km	MPC · JPL
349918	2009 SU_{154}	—	August 16, 2009	Kitt Peak	Spacewatch	L4	8.4 km	MPC · JPL
349919	2009 SZ_{166}	—	September 22, 2009	Kitt Peak	Spacewatch	L4 · ERY	8.3 km	MPC · JPL
349920	2009 SC_{211}	—	September 23, 2009	Kitt Peak	Spacewatch	L4	10 km	MPC · JPL
349921	2009 SB_{280}	—	September 25, 2009	Kitt Peak	Spacewatch	·	3.0 km	MPC · JPL
349922	2009 TW_{42}	—	October 1, 2009	Charleston	Astronomical Research Observatory	H	560 m	MPC · JPL
349923	2009 UF_{8}	—	May 10, 2004	Kitt Peak	Spacewatch	L4	10 km	MPC · JPL
349924	2009 UW_{91}	—	March 9, 2008	Siding Spring	SSS	H	950 m	MPC · JPL
349925	2009 WC_{26}	—	November 22, 2009	Catalina	CSS	APO +1km	920 m	MPC · JPL
349926	2009 WV_{41}	—	November 17, 2009	Kitt Peak	Spacewatch	·	690 m	MPC · JPL
349927	2009 WB_{50}	—	November 19, 2009	Kitt Peak	Spacewatch	·	700 m	MPC · JPL
349928	2009 WD_{106}	—	November 25, 2009	Socorro	LINEAR	APO	720 m	MPC · JPL
349929	2009 WT_{202}	—	November 8, 2009	Kitt Peak	Spacewatch	H	680 m	MPC · JPL
349930	2009 XH_{17}	—	February 6, 2007	Mount Lemmon	Mount Lemmon Survey	·	690 m	MPC · JPL
349931	2009 XE_{18}	—	December 15, 2009	Mount Lemmon	Mount Lemmon Survey	·	780 m	MPC · JPL
349932	2009 XO_{18}	—	December 15, 2009	Mount Lemmon	Mount Lemmon Survey	HOF	3.4 km	MPC · JPL
349933	2009 YF_{7}	—	December 19, 2009	La Silla	D. L. Rabinowitz	T_{j} (2.74) · centaur	40 km	MPC · JPL
349934	2010 AX_{5}	—	January 5, 2010	Kitt Peak	Spacewatch	PHO	1.5 km	MPC · JPL
349935	2010 AD_{9}	—	January 6, 2010	Kitt Peak	Spacewatch	·	760 m	MPC · JPL
349936	2010 AC_{12}	—	January 6, 2010	Kitt Peak	Spacewatch	·	850 m	MPC · JPL
349937	2010 AN_{15}	—	May 21, 2004	Kitt Peak	Spacewatch	·	1.0 km	MPC · JPL
349938	2010 AP_{29}	—	January 8, 2010	Mount Lemmon	Mount Lemmon Survey	·	960 m	MPC · JPL
349939	2010 AH_{50}	—	January 8, 2010	Kitt Peak	Spacewatch	·	1.4 km	MPC · JPL
349940	2010 AK_{53}	—	January 8, 2010	Kitt Peak	Spacewatch	PHO	1.4 km	MPC · JPL
349941	2010 CY_{2}	—	February 5, 2010	Kitt Peak	Spacewatch	·	1.0 km	MPC · JPL
349942	2010 CR_{22}	—	February 9, 2010	Kitt Peak	Spacewatch	·	780 m	MPC · JPL
349943	2010 CO_{29}	—	February 9, 2010	Kitt Peak	Spacewatch	·	1.8 km	MPC · JPL
349944	2010 CH_{32}	—	February 9, 2010	Kitt Peak	Spacewatch	·	1.6 km	MPC · JPL
349945	2010 CD_{52}	—	February 13, 2010	WISE	WISE	·	4.0 km	MPC · JPL
349946	2010 CE_{62}	—	February 9, 2010	Kitt Peak	Spacewatch	·	740 m	MPC · JPL
349947	2010 CP_{63}	—	February 9, 2010	Kitt Peak	Spacewatch	MAS	760 m	MPC · JPL
349948	2010 CC_{69}	—	February 10, 2010	Kitt Peak	Spacewatch	·	770 m	MPC · JPL
349949	2010 CN_{69}	—	April 23, 2007	Mount Lemmon	Mount Lemmon Survey	V	690 m	MPC · JPL
349950	2010 CL_{85}	—	March 2, 1995	Kitt Peak	Spacewatch	·	1.4 km	MPC · JPL
349951	2010 CR_{107}	—	February 14, 2010	Kitt Peak	Spacewatch	·	750 m	MPC · JPL
349952	2010 CY_{107}	—	February 14, 2010	Kitt Peak	Spacewatch	·	750 m	MPC · JPL
349953	2010 CK_{119}	—	February 15, 2010	Kitt Peak	Spacewatch	·	1.2 km	MPC · JPL
349954	2010 CR_{123}	—	October 7, 2000	Anderson Mesa	LONEOS	MAS	870 m	MPC · JPL
349955	2010 CO_{127}	—	February 15, 2010	Kitt Peak	Spacewatch	·	970 m	MPC · JPL
349956	2010 CS_{146}	—	February 13, 2010	Kitt Peak	Spacewatch	·	1.7 km	MPC · JPL
349957	2010 CM_{166}	—	February 13, 2010	Kitt Peak	Spacewatch	·	2.0 km	MPC · JPL
349958	2010 CK_{182}	—	February 14, 2010	Haleakala	Pan-STARRS 1	·	730 m	MPC · JPL
349959	2010 CC_{222}	—	February 8, 2010	WISE	WISE	·	2.3 km	MPC · JPL
349960	2010 DK_{20}	—	September 24, 2008	Mount Lemmon	Mount Lemmon Survey	·	2.7 km	MPC · JPL
349961	2010 DO_{30}	—	February 19, 2010	WISE	WISE	·	2.2 km	MPC · JPL
349962	2010 DP_{31}	—	July 3, 2005	Palomar	NEAT	LIX	4.7 km	MPC · JPL
349963	2010 DV_{31}	—	February 17, 2010	WISE	WISE	·	3.5 km	MPC · JPL
349964	2010 DO_{46}	—	January 5, 2006	Kitt Peak	Spacewatch	NYS	980 m	MPC · JPL
349965	2010 DP_{65}	—	February 26, 2010	WISE	WISE	·	4.4 km	MPC · JPL
349966	2010 ER_{7}	—	March 3, 2010	WISE	WISE	·	5.2 km	MPC · JPL
349967	2010 ET_{7}	—	March 3, 2010	WISE	WISE	·	2.2 km	MPC · JPL
349968	2010 ES_{21}	—	March 4, 2010	Kitt Peak	Spacewatch	·	1.3 km	MPC · JPL
349969	2010 EG_{29}	—	March 4, 2010	Kitt Peak	Spacewatch	·	2.0 km	MPC · JPL
349970	2010 EA_{35}	—	March 10, 2010	Purple Mountain	PMO NEO Survey Program	·	1.2 km	MPC · JPL
349971	2010 EE_{40}	—	February 14, 2010	Mount Lemmon	Mount Lemmon Survey	·	1.9 km	MPC · JPL
349972	2010 EW_{66}	—	March 2, 2006	Kitt Peak	Spacewatch	·	2.2 km	MPC · JPL
349973	2010 EE_{67}	—	March 12, 2010	Catalina	CSS	·	1.5 km	MPC · JPL
349974	2010 ES_{77}	—	March 10, 2003	Anderson Mesa	LONEOS	V	830 m	MPC · JPL
349975	2010 EX_{85}	—	August 6, 2004	Palomar	NEAT	·	1.2 km	MPC · JPL
349976	2010 EC_{86}	—	March 13, 2010	Kitt Peak	Spacewatch	·	2.0 km	MPC · JPL
349977	2010 EG_{90}	—	January 26, 2006	Kitt Peak	Spacewatch	EUN	1.6 km	MPC · JPL
349978	2010 EP_{103}	—	March 15, 2010	Mount Lemmon	Mount Lemmon Survey	(5)	1.6 km	MPC · JPL
349979	2010 EO_{108}	—	March 13, 2010	Mount Lemmon	Mount Lemmon Survey	·	860 m	MPC · JPL
349980	2010 EH_{110}	—	March 12, 2010	Kitt Peak	Spacewatch	·	670 m	MPC · JPL
349981	2010 EQ_{113}	—	March 5, 2010	Catalina	CSS	·	2.1 km	MPC · JPL
349982	2010 ED_{121}	—	October 28, 2008	Mount Lemmon	Mount Lemmon Survey	·	1.3 km	MPC · JPL
349983	2010 EL_{123}	—	March 15, 2010	Kitt Peak	Spacewatch	·	1.7 km	MPC · JPL
349984	2010 EG_{124}	—	April 4, 2003	Kitt Peak	Spacewatch	NYS	1.1 km	MPC · JPL
349985	2010 ER_{127}	—	March 7, 2003	Anderson Mesa	LONEOS	·	970 m	MPC · JPL
349986	2010 ES_{131}	—	March 15, 2010	Kitt Peak	Spacewatch	·	2.0 km	MPC · JPL
349987	2010 EK_{134}	—	September 25, 2008	Kitt Peak	Spacewatch	·	1.0 km	MPC · JPL
349988	2010 EW_{140}	—	September 17, 2003	Kitt Peak	Spacewatch	·	1.4 km	MPC · JPL
349989	2010 EO_{171}	—	December 5, 2008	Kitt Peak	Spacewatch	·	2.0 km	MPC · JPL
349990	2010 EY_{171}	—	September 26, 2003	Apache Point	SDSS	·	2.2 km	MPC · JPL
349991	2010 FM_{20}	—	June 21, 2007	Mount Lemmon	Mount Lemmon Survey	·	1.8 km	MPC · JPL
349992	2010 FD_{29}	—	February 16, 2010	Kitt Peak	Spacewatch	·	2.7 km	MPC · JPL
349993	2010 FE_{85}	—	March 19, 2010	Mount Lemmon	Mount Lemmon Survey	·	1.5 km	MPC · JPL
349994	2010 FS_{88}	—	March 18, 2010	Kitt Peak	Spacewatch	NYS	1.1 km	MPC · JPL
349995	2010 FE_{92}	—	March 20, 2010	Catalina	CSS	·	3.0 km	MPC · JPL
349996	2010 FU_{92}	—	March 19, 2010	Catalina	CSS	·	4.0 km	MPC · JPL
349997	2010 FY_{98}	—	October 9, 2007	Kitt Peak	Spacewatch	·	2.1 km	MPC · JPL
349998	2010 GP_{27}	—	April 5, 2010	Kitt Peak	Spacewatch	·	1.4 km	MPC · JPL
349999	2010 GC_{28}	—	April 6, 2010	Kitt Peak	Spacewatch	·	1.8 km	MPC · JPL
350000	2010 GM_{28}	—	April 6, 2010	Kitt Peak	Spacewatch	·	1.9 km	MPC · JPL

back to top

== See also ==
- Meanings of minor-planet names: 349001–350000
