= List of minor planets: 350001–351000 =

The following is a partial list of minor planets, running from minor-planet number 350001 through 351000, inclusive. The primary data for this and other partial lists is based on JPL's "Small-Body Orbital Elements" and data available from the Minor Planet Center. Critical list information is also provided by the MPC, unless otherwise specified from Lowell Observatory. A detailed description of the table's columns and additional sources are given on the main page including a complete list of every page in this series, and a statistical break-up on the dynamical classification of minor planets.

Also see the summary list of all named bodies in numerical and alphabetical order, and the corresponding naming citations for the number range of this particular list. New namings may only be added to this list after official publication, as the preannouncement of names is condemned by the Working Group for Small Bodies Nomenclature of the International Astronomical Union.

Near-Earth obj.	MBA (inner)	MBA (outer)	Centaur
Mars-crosser	MBA (middle)	Jupiter trojan	Trans-Neptunian obj.
Unclassified

== 350001–350100 ==
Designation			Discovery			Properties		Ref
Permanent	Provisional	Named after	Date	Site	Discoverer(s)	Category	Diam.	Ref
350001	2010 GX_{98}	—	February 16, 2001	Kitt Peak	Spacewatch	·	1.2 km	MPC · JPL
350002	2010 GA_{101}	—	June 22, 2007	Kitt Peak	Spacewatch	(5)	1.4 km	MPC · JPL
350003	2010 GH_{104}	—	March 25, 2010	Kitt Peak	Spacewatch	KOR	1.5 km	MPC · JPL
350004	2010 GJ_{127}	—	April 10, 2010	Kitt Peak	Spacewatch	·	2.9 km	MPC · JPL
350005	2010 GU_{135}	—	April 4, 2010	Kitt Peak	Spacewatch	ERI	1.7 km	MPC · JPL
350006	2010 GR_{147}	—	April 15, 2010	WISE	WISE	L5	11 km	MPC · JPL
350007	2010 GG_{156}	—	April 14, 2010	Mount Lemmon	Mount Lemmon Survey	fast	2.1 km	MPC · JPL
350008	2010 GW_{157}	—	April 12, 2010	Kitt Peak	Spacewatch	·	2.1 km	MPC · JPL
350009	2010 HX_{23}	—	April 26, 2010	WISE	WISE	L5	13 km	MPC · JPL
350010	2010 HP_{68}	—	April 27, 2010	WISE	WISE	·	2.1 km	MPC · JPL
350011	2010 HJ_{74}	—	April 28, 2010	WISE	WISE	·	6.1 km	MPC · JPL
350012	2010 HX_{77}	—	April 20, 2010	Kitt Peak	Spacewatch	·	2.3 km	MPC · JPL
350013	2010 HQ_{107}	—	April 23, 2010	Purple Mountain	PMO NEO Survey Program	·	3.1 km	MPC · JPL
350014	2010 JX_{14}	—	May 5, 2010	Catalina	CSS	·	3.9 km	MPC · JPL
350015	2010 JG_{31}	—	October 4, 2007	Kitt Peak	Spacewatch	·	1.9 km	MPC · JPL
350016	2010 JA_{38}	—	May 3, 2010	Kitt Peak	Spacewatch	·	1.2 km	MPC · JPL
350017	2010 JD_{40}	—	May 6, 2010	Mount Lemmon	Mount Lemmon Survey	EUN	1.6 km	MPC · JPL
350018	2010 JL_{40}	—	May 3, 2010	Kitt Peak	Spacewatch	·	2.9 km	MPC · JPL
350019	2010 JZ_{40}	—	November 11, 2007	Mount Lemmon	Mount Lemmon Survey	·	3.6 km	MPC · JPL
350020	2010 JO_{74}	—	May 11, 2010	Mount Lemmon	Mount Lemmon Survey	·	1.7 km	MPC · JPL
350021	2010 JW_{75}	—	January 19, 2005	Catalina	CSS	EUN	1.5 km	MPC · JPL
350022	2010 JN_{77}	—	May 3, 2010	Kitt Peak	Spacewatch	HYG	3.8 km	MPC · JPL
350023	2010 JW_{82}	—	January 3, 2001	Socorro	LINEAR	·	2.1 km	MPC · JPL
350024	2010 JO_{112}	—	May 13, 2010	Kitt Peak	Spacewatch	·	4.5 km	MPC · JPL
350025	2010 JX_{115}	—	May 4, 2010	Catalina	CSS	DOR	3.6 km	MPC · JPL
350026	2010 JG_{116}	—	May 9, 2010	Siding Spring	SSS	·	2.4 km	MPC · JPL
350027	2010 JH_{121}	—	May 12, 2010	Mount Lemmon	Mount Lemmon Survey	·	3.1 km	MPC · JPL
350028	2010 JP_{146}	—	October 3, 2002	Palomar	NEAT	EOS	3.0 km	MPC · JPL
350029	2010 JR_{147}	—	May 21, 1993	Kitt Peak	Spacewatch	·	1.9 km	MPC · JPL
350030	2010 JN_{150}	—	May 11, 2010	Mount Lemmon	Mount Lemmon Survey	·	2.6 km	MPC · JPL
350031	2010 JU_{150}	—	May 11, 2010	Mount Lemmon	Mount Lemmon Survey	VER	4.0 km	MPC · JPL
350032 Josephhunt	2010 JH_{151}	Josephhunt	February 17, 2010	WISE	WISE	·	3.3 km	MPC · JPL
350033	2010 JP_{153}	—	May 11, 2010	Kitt Peak	Spacewatch	·	2.0 km	MPC · JPL
350034	2010 JQ_{163}	—	May 9, 2010	Mount Lemmon	Mount Lemmon Survey	·	2.9 km	MPC · JPL
350035	2010 JW_{169}	—	May 5, 2010	Mount Lemmon	Mount Lemmon Survey	·	1.6 km	MPC · JPL
350036	2010 JV_{173}	—	April 10, 2005	Mount Lemmon	Mount Lemmon Survey	·	1.5 km	MPC · JPL
350037	2010 JR_{177}	—	December 6, 2000	Socorro	LINEAR	·	2.0 km	MPC · JPL
350038	2010 KW_{14}	—	May 17, 2010	WISE	WISE	·	4.2 km	MPC · JPL
350039	2010 KQ_{40}	—	October 15, 2001	Palomar	NEAT	·	2.5 km	MPC · JPL
350040	2010 KK_{62}	—	May 20, 2010	Mount Lemmon	Mount Lemmon Survey	·	1.3 km	MPC · JPL
350041	2010 KN_{117}	—	May 19, 2010	Catalina	CSS	·	2.4 km	MPC · JPL
350042	2010 KP_{121}	—	April 23, 1998	Kitt Peak	Spacewatch	·	3.0 km	MPC · JPL
350043	2010 KK_{129}	—	November 30, 2005	Mount Lemmon	Mount Lemmon Survey	V	720 m	MPC · JPL
350044	2010 LV_{44}	—	June 20, 2004	Kitt Peak	Spacewatch	·	5.6 km	MPC · JPL
350045	2010 LT_{106}	—	June 1, 2010	Catalina	CSS	EUN	1.5 km	MPC · JPL
350046	2010 NV_{117}	—	July 11, 2010	La Sagra	OAM	T_{j} (2.96)	4.6 km	MPC · JPL
350047	2010 OA_{7}	—	July 16, 2010	WISE	WISE	(10369)	5.1 km	MPC · JPL
350048	2010 OG_{30}	—	January 11, 2008	Kitt Peak	Spacewatch	·	1.4 km	MPC · JPL
350049	2010 OE_{91}	—	June 13, 2005	Campo Imperatore	CINEOS	·	3.3 km	MPC · JPL
350050	2010 PP_{5}	—	August 1, 2010	WISE	WISE	·	2.8 km	MPC · JPL
350051	2010 PH_{25}	—	August 5, 2010	WISE	WISE	L4 · (8060)	10 km	MPC · JPL
350052	2010 PQ_{38}	—	March 26, 2003	Kitt Peak	Spacewatch	L4	10 km	MPC · JPL
350053	2010 PE_{49}	—	August 7, 2010	WISE	WISE	L4 · ERY	8.5 km	MPC · JPL
350054	2010 RN_{37}	—	September 13, 2002	Palomar	NEAT	3:2 · SHU	6.0 km	MPC · JPL
350055	2010 RE_{38}	—	November 26, 2009	Mount Lemmon	Mount Lemmon Survey	L4	13 km	MPC · JPL
350056	2010 RU_{39}	—	September 29, 2005	Catalina	CSS	·	4.7 km	MPC · JPL
350057	2010 RZ_{179}	—	February 22, 2009	Mount Lemmon	Mount Lemmon Survey	H	520 m	MPC · JPL
350058	2010 SZ_{6}	—	September 27, 2005	Kitt Peak	Spacewatch	·	3.7 km	MPC · JPL
350059	2010 TA_{143}	—	August 15, 2009	Kitt Peak	Spacewatch	L4	8.9 km	MPC · JPL
350060	2010 VV_{114}	—	November 4, 2010	Les Engarouines	L. Bernasconi	L4	10 km	MPC · JPL
350061	2010 VX_{141}	—	November 6, 2010	Mount Lemmon	Mount Lemmon Survey	L4	10 km	MPC · JPL
350062	2011 AN_{10}	—	September 30, 2009	Mount Lemmon	Mount Lemmon Survey	·	3.3 km	MPC · JPL
350063	2011 EA_{74}	—	February 8, 2011	Mount Lemmon	Mount Lemmon Survey	H	750 m	MPC · JPL
350064	2011 FS_{106}	—	July 4, 2005	Mount Lemmon	Mount Lemmon Survey	·	870 m	MPC · JPL
350065	2011 GT_{9}	—	September 18, 1996	Prescott	P. G. Comba	·	1.3 km	MPC · JPL
350066	2011 GF_{12}	—	August 27, 2005	Palomar	NEAT	·	650 m	MPC · JPL
350067	2011 GP_{85}	—	May 1, 2006	Kitt Peak	Spacewatch	H	500 m	MPC · JPL
350068	2011 HQ_{2}	—	August 23, 2008	Siding Spring	SSS	PHO	1.4 km	MPC · JPL
350069	2011 HJ_{23}	—	October 15, 2004	Mount Lemmon	Mount Lemmon Survey	H	530 m	MPC · JPL
350070	2011 HP_{39}	—	July 9, 2008	Črni Vrh	Skvarč, J.	·	850 m	MPC · JPL
350071	2011 HQ_{75}	—	October 25, 1995	Kitt Peak	Spacewatch	·	840 m	MPC · JPL
350072	2011 HX_{75}	—	November 30, 2005	Kitt Peak	Spacewatch	·	1.3 km	MPC · JPL
350073	2011 HX_{76}	—	May 12, 2007	Mount Lemmon	Mount Lemmon Survey	·	1.0 km	MPC · JPL
350074	2011 HM_{80}	—	May 11, 2007	Kitt Peak	Spacewatch	·	1.4 km	MPC · JPL
350075	2011 HW_{95}	—	November 14, 2001	Kitt Peak	Spacewatch	NYS	1.4 km	MPC · JPL
350076	2011 JO_{3}	—	December 14, 2001	Socorro	LINEAR	H	570 m	MPC · JPL
350077	2011 JQ_{3}	—	December 14, 2001	Socorro	LINEAR	H	730 m	MPC · JPL
350078	2011 JX_{9}	—	April 2, 2009	Mount Lemmon	Mount Lemmon Survey	L5	10 km	MPC · JPL
350079	2011 JL_{15}	—	September 15, 2007	Mount Lemmon	Mount Lemmon Survey	H	730 m	MPC · JPL
350080	2011 JU_{28}	—	June 22, 2004	Kitt Peak	Spacewatch	MAS	750 m	MPC · JPL
350081	2011 JR_{29}	—	November 17, 2001	Socorro	LINEAR	H	600 m	MPC · JPL
350082	2011 KU_{1}	—	June 19, 2006	Mount Lemmon	Mount Lemmon Survey	TIR	3.5 km	MPC · JPL
350083	2011 KH_{2}	—	September 6, 2004	Palomar	NEAT	V	840 m	MPC · JPL
350084	2011 KS_{3}	—	May 21, 1990	Kitt Peak	Spacewatch	PHO	770 m	MPC · JPL
350085	2011 KF_{15}	—	September 29, 2008	Mount Lemmon	Mount Lemmon Survey	·	1.3 km	MPC · JPL
350086	2011 KL_{21}	—	October 31, 2005	Mount Lemmon	Mount Lemmon Survey	·	840 m	MPC · JPL
350087	2011 KW_{23}	—	March 15, 2004	Kitt Peak	Spacewatch	·	800 m	MPC · JPL
350088	2011 KJ_{24}	—	July 10, 2007	Siding Spring	SSS	·	1.7 km	MPC · JPL
350089	2011 KZ_{26}	—	August 13, 2008	Siding Spring	SSS	PHO	2.3 km	MPC · JPL
350090	2011 KN_{34}	—	February 25, 2006	Mount Lemmon	Mount Lemmon Survey	·	2.1 km	MPC · JPL
350091	2011 LC_{14}	—	January 27, 2007	Mount Lemmon	Mount Lemmon Survey	·	1.1 km	MPC · JPL
350092	2011 MC_{1}	—	December 20, 2004	Mount Lemmon	Mount Lemmon Survey	WIT	1.2 km	MPC · JPL
350093	2011 MK_{1}	—	October 3, 2003	Kitt Peak	Spacewatch	·	2.1 km	MPC · JPL
350094	2011 MG_{9}	—	September 14, 2007	Kitt Peak	Spacewatch	·	1.4 km	MPC · JPL
350095	2011 NG_{1}	—	August 16, 2001	Socorro	LINEAR	·	940 m	MPC · JPL
350096	2011 NT_{1}	—	March 24, 1993	Kitt Peak	Spacewatch	·	3.6 km	MPC · JPL
350097	2011 OQ_{1}	—	February 27, 2003	Campo Imperatore	CINEOS	·	5.8 km	MPC · JPL
350098	2011 OY_{15}	—	October 30, 2008	Mount Lemmon	Mount Lemmon Survey	·	1.0 km	MPC · JPL
350099	2011 OG_{16}	—	August 23, 2003	Palomar	NEAT	·	3.3 km	MPC · JPL
350100	2011 OA_{22}	—	December 31, 2007	Kitt Peak	Spacewatch	EUP	3.4 km	MPC · JPL

== 350101–350200 ==
back to top

Designation			Discovery			Properties		Ref
Permanent	Provisional	Named after	Date	Site	Discoverer(s)	Category	Diam.	Ref
350101	2011 OB_{22}	—	December 6, 1996	Kitt Peak	Spacewatch	·	2.0 km	MPC · JPL
350102	2011 OU_{25}	—	October 8, 2008	Mount Lemmon	Mount Lemmon Survey	BAP	990 m	MPC · JPL
350103	2011 OZ_{37}	—	February 18, 2010	Kitt Peak	Spacewatch	·	1.3 km	MPC · JPL
350104	2011 OA_{44}	—	September 10, 2007	Kitt Peak	Spacewatch	·	1.4 km	MPC · JPL
350105	2011 OY_{48}	—	February 21, 2009	Kitt Peak	Spacewatch	EOS	1.6 km	MPC · JPL
350106	2011 PS_{8}	—	September 15, 2006	Kitt Peak	Spacewatch	·	2.9 km	MPC · JPL
350107	2011 PE_{10}	—	September 17, 2006	Catalina	CSS	TIR	3.8 km	MPC · JPL
350108	2011 PX_{14}	—	September 30, 2003	Anderson Mesa	LONEOS	HNS	1.9 km	MPC · JPL
350109	2011 PB_{15}	—	December 19, 2003	Kitt Peak	Spacewatch	L5	10 km	MPC · JPL
350110	2011 QJ_{1}	—	September 29, 2001	Palomar	NEAT	EOS	2.4 km	MPC · JPL
350111	2011 QC_{7}	—	August 5, 2002	Palomar	NEAT	·	1.9 km	MPC · JPL
350112	2011 QM_{8}	—	February 14, 2010	WISE	WISE	T_{j} (2.98) · EUP	4.5 km	MPC · JPL
350113	2011 QM_{9}	—	January 21, 2009	Bergisch Gladbach	W. Bickel	(18466)	2.9 km	MPC · JPL
350114	2011 QM_{10}	—	September 19, 2006	Kitt Peak	Spacewatch	·	2.3 km	MPC · JPL
350115	2011 QE_{12}	—	March 29, 2004	Kitt Peak	Spacewatch	·	2.7 km	MPC · JPL
350116	2011 QQ_{22}	—	March 27, 2003	Palomar	NEAT	·	1.3 km	MPC · JPL
350117	2011 QA_{25}	—	October 25, 2005	Kitt Peak	Spacewatch	·	770 m	MPC · JPL
350118	2011 QW_{40}	—	October 3, 2006	Mount Lemmon	Mount Lemmon Survey	EOS	2.5 km	MPC · JPL
350119	2011 QN_{55}	—	October 20, 2001	Socorro	LINEAR	EOS	2.5 km	MPC · JPL
350120	2011 QE_{59}	—	April 10, 2010	Mount Lemmon	Mount Lemmon Survey	·	2.6 km	MPC · JPL
350121	2011 QM_{59}	—	September 18, 2006	Kitt Peak	Spacewatch	·	3.3 km	MPC · JPL
350122	2011 QR_{63}	—	October 4, 2000	Socorro	LINEAR	·	3.5 km	MPC · JPL
350123	2011 QJ_{64}	—	October 16, 2006	Kitt Peak	Spacewatch	VER	2.5 km	MPC · JPL
350124	2011 QR_{68}	—	September 3, 2002	Palomar	NEAT	·	2.3 km	MPC · JPL
350125	2011 QN_{77}	—	September 16, 2006	Catalina	CSS	·	2.7 km	MPC · JPL
350126	2011 QM_{91}	—	February 1, 2009	Kitt Peak	Spacewatch	·	1.8 km	MPC · JPL
350127	2011 QO_{94}	—	February 26, 2009	Catalina	CSS	·	3.1 km	MPC · JPL
350128	2011 QV_{96}	—	September 25, 2006	Mount Lemmon	Mount Lemmon Survey	·	2.2 km	MPC · JPL
350129	2011 QX_{96}	—	May 1, 2003	Kitt Peak	Spacewatch	MAS	810 m	MPC · JPL
350130	2011 RH_{2}	—	January 16, 2008	Kitt Peak	Spacewatch	·	2.4 km	MPC · JPL
350131	2011 RK_{3}	—	February 8, 2002	Socorro	LINEAR	·	4.1 km	MPC · JPL
350132	2011 RC_{6}	—	March 11, 2005	Mount Lemmon	Mount Lemmon Survey	·	1.7 km	MPC · JPL
350133	2011 RB_{7}	—	September 16, 2006	Kitt Peak	Spacewatch	·	1.8 km	MPC · JPL
350134	2011 RD_{18}	—	October 4, 2004	Kitt Peak	Spacewatch	·	2.1 km	MPC · JPL
350135	2011 SP_{1}	—	April 2, 2005	Mount Lemmon	Mount Lemmon Survey	·	1.4 km	MPC · JPL
350136	2011 SB_{43}	—	September 27, 2006	Kitt Peak	Spacewatch	·	2.6 km	MPC · JPL
350137	2011 SX_{43}	—	January 23, 2006	Kitt Peak	Spacewatch	V	860 m	MPC · JPL
350138	2011 ST_{46}	—	September 20, 2001	Kitt Peak	Spacewatch	EOS	1.9 km	MPC · JPL
350139	2011 SN_{51}	—	August 14, 2006	Siding Spring	SSS	·	2.3 km	MPC · JPL
350140	2011 SR_{59}	—	April 21, 2009	Mount Lemmon	Mount Lemmon Survey	·	1.9 km	MPC · JPL
350141	2011 SE_{61}	—	December 12, 1996	Kitt Peak	Spacewatch	·	3.4 km	MPC · JPL
350142	2011 SP_{61}	—	October 4, 1996	Kitt Peak	Spacewatch	·	2.4 km	MPC · JPL
350143	2011 SW_{63}	—	April 23, 1998	Socorro	LINEAR	·	4.2 km	MPC · JPL
350144	2011 SE_{64}	—	August 29, 2005	Kitt Peak	Spacewatch	·	4.8 km	MPC · JPL
350145	2011 SH_{72}	—	August 12, 1997	Kitt Peak	Spacewatch	·	2.4 km	MPC · JPL
350146	2011 SD_{79}	—	March 29, 2009	Kitt Peak	Spacewatch	(31811)	2.8 km	MPC · JPL
350147	2011 SO_{80}	—	March 13, 2005	Kitt Peak	Spacewatch	·	2.1 km	MPC · JPL
350148	2011 SN_{83}	—	November 7, 2007	Kitt Peak	Spacewatch	AGN	1.5 km	MPC · JPL
350149	2011 SQ_{86}	—	September 17, 1995	Kitt Peak	Spacewatch	·	4.9 km	MPC · JPL
350150	2011 SG_{88}	—	July 3, 2011	Mount Lemmon	Mount Lemmon Survey	·	3.7 km	MPC · JPL
350151	2011 SJ_{101}	—	March 31, 2009	Mount Lemmon	Mount Lemmon Survey	·	1.9 km	MPC · JPL
350152	2011 SD_{104}	—	December 19, 2007	Mount Lemmon	Mount Lemmon Survey	EOS	2.6 km	MPC · JPL
350153	2011 SH_{114}	—	December 14, 2001	Socorro	LINEAR	·	3.2 km	MPC · JPL
350154	2011 SJ_{136}	—	November 12, 2006	Mount Lemmon	Mount Lemmon Survey	·	3.2 km	MPC · JPL
350155	2011 SZ_{137}	—	September 30, 2003	Kvistaberg	Uppsala-DLR Asteroid Survey	HIL · 3:2	6.8 km	MPC · JPL
350156	2011 SU_{180}	—	August 31, 2005	Palomar	NEAT	·	4.7 km	MPC · JPL
350157	2011 SU_{182}	—	September 26, 2006	Kitt Peak	Spacewatch	·	2.3 km	MPC · JPL
350158	2011 SH_{195}	—	November 19, 2007	Kitt Peak	Spacewatch	·	1.9 km	MPC · JPL
350159	2011 ST_{202}	—	July 6, 2005	Kitt Peak	Spacewatch	·	3.5 km	MPC · JPL
350160	2011 SP_{206}	—	July 21, 2006	Mount Lemmon	Mount Lemmon Survey	·	2.7 km	MPC · JPL
350161	2011 SZ_{221}	—	August 4, 2005	Palomar	NEAT	·	2.9 km	MPC · JPL
350162	2011 SE_{236}	—	August 25, 2004	Kitt Peak	Spacewatch	·	890 m	MPC · JPL
350163	2011 SV_{261}	—	October 23, 2006	Catalina	CSS	·	5.4 km	MPC · JPL
350164	2011 TB_{6}	—	July 7, 2005	Kitt Peak	Spacewatch	·	3.0 km	MPC · JPL
350165	2011 TO_{11}	—	September 16, 2006	Kitt Peak	Spacewatch	·	1.9 km	MPC · JPL
350166	2011 TH_{12}	—	October 2, 2000	Kitt Peak	Spacewatch	VER	3.4 km	MPC · JPL
350167	2011 TL_{13}	—	September 16, 2006	Catalina	CSS	EOS	2.3 km	MPC · JPL
350168	2011 TK_{16}	—	September 29, 2005	Kitt Peak	Spacewatch	·	4.1 km	MPC · JPL
350169	2011 UL	—	July 18, 2006	Siding Spring	SSS	ADE	3.5 km	MPC · JPL
350170	2011 UP_{18}	—	March 23, 2003	Apache Point	SDSS	·	3.2 km	MPC · JPL
350171	2011 UF_{33}	—	August 30, 2005	Palomar	NEAT	EOS	5.1 km	MPC · JPL
350172	2011 UC_{86}	—	December 15, 2001	Apache Point	SDSS	·	2.9 km	MPC · JPL
350173 Yoshidanaoki	2011 UL_{96}	Yoshidanaoki	April 24, 2004	Kitt Peak	Spacewatch	·	1.9 km	MPC · JPL
350174	2011 US_{115}	—	July 29, 2005	Palomar	NEAT	EOS	2.6 km	MPC · JPL
350175	2011 UA_{116}	—	October 31, 2002	Haleakala	NEAT	AGN	1.5 km	MPC · JPL
350176	2011 UK_{122}	—	March 1, 2004	Kitt Peak	Spacewatch	·	2.0 km	MPC · JPL
350177	2011 UD_{131}	—	August 29, 2005	Kitt Peak	Spacewatch	·	2.5 km	MPC · JPL
350178 Eisleben	2011 UR_{139}	Eisleben	March 30, 1992	Tautenburg	F. Börngen	·	2.1 km	MPC · JPL
350179	2011 UY_{145}	—	May 16, 2004	Kitt Peak	Spacewatch	L4	10 km	MPC · JPL
350180	2011 UU_{181}	—	September 28, 2006	Mount Lemmon	Mount Lemmon Survey	·	1.8 km	MPC · JPL
350181	2011 UJ_{185}	—	November 11, 2006	Kitt Peak	Spacewatch	·	3.9 km	MPC · JPL
350182	2011 UL_{188}	—	May 30, 2005	Siding Spring	SSS	·	3.3 km	MPC · JPL
350183	2011 UD_{198}	—	October 13, 1998	Kitt Peak	Spacewatch	CYB	5.0 km	MPC · JPL
350184	2011 UU_{256}	—	August 29, 2005	Palomar	NEAT	·	4.0 km	MPC · JPL
350185 Linnell	2011 UA_{260}	Linnell	June 3, 2006	Mauna Kea	D. D. Balam	·	1.6 km	MPC · JPL
350186	2011 UY_{301}	—	July 27, 2005	Palomar	NEAT	·	4.1 km	MPC · JPL
350187	2011 US_{325}	—	February 6, 2008	Catalina	CSS	·	4.1 km	MPC · JPL
350188	2011 UR_{332}	—	December 23, 2001	Kitt Peak	Spacewatch	EOS	2.9 km	MPC · JPL
350189	2011 UT_{336}	—	September 20, 2001	Apache Point	SDSS	·	2.7 km	MPC · JPL
350190	2011 UE_{397}	—	April 11, 2003	Kitt Peak	Spacewatch	VER	5.8 km	MPC · JPL
350191	2011 UG_{402}	—	January 19, 2002	Kitt Peak	Spacewatch	L4	8.5 km	MPC · JPL
350192	2011 WG_{32}	—	February 9, 2002	Kitt Peak	Spacewatch	L4	9.7 km	MPC · JPL
350193	2011 WS_{106}	—	November 30, 2011	Piszkés-tető	K. Sárneczky, A. Szing	L4	10 km	MPC · JPL
350194	2011 WX_{117}	—	October 22, 2005	Palomar	NEAT	URS	4.6 km	MPC · JPL
350195	2011 YE_{2}	—	July 29, 2005	Palomar	NEAT	·	3.3 km	MPC · JPL
350196	2011 YH_{65}	—	September 5, 2008	Kitt Peak	Spacewatch	L4	10 km	MPC · JPL
350197	2012 AV_{5}	—	November 25, 2005	Mount Lemmon	Mount Lemmon Survey	·	3.4 km	MPC · JPL
350198	2012 AL_{14}	—	September 25, 2009	Catalina	CSS	L4	10 km	MPC · JPL
350199	2012 BK_{68}	—	February 26, 2007	Mount Lemmon	Mount Lemmon Survey	VER	4.2 km	MPC · JPL
350200	2012 CA_{6}	—	November 20, 2006	Kitt Peak	Spacewatch	DOR	2.5 km	MPC · JPL

== 350201–350300 ==
back to top

Designation			Discovery			Properties		Ref
Permanent	Provisional	Named after	Date	Site	Discoverer(s)	Category	Diam.	Ref
350201	2012 HC_{23}	—	January 16, 2005	Catalina	CSS	LUT	5.7 km	MPC · JPL
350202	2012 LL_{11}	—	October 13, 2002	Palomar	NEAT	L5	20 km	MPC · JPL
350203	2012 OF_{6}	—	December 22, 2003	Kitt Peak	Spacewatch	·	4.0 km	MPC · JPL
350204	2012 PL_{5}	—	October 31, 1999	Socorro	LINEAR	·	3.6 km	MPC · JPL
350205	2012 QE_{2}	—	May 25, 2006	Mauna Kea	P. A. Wiegert	·	3.4 km	MPC · JPL
350206	2012 QS_{39}	—	September 21, 2001	Socorro	LINEAR	·	3.0 km	MPC · JPL
350207	2012 QB_{41}	—	January 28, 2006	Kitt Peak	Spacewatch	·	2.4 km	MPC · JPL
350208	2012 RA_{1}	—	August 31, 2005	Kitt Peak	Spacewatch	·	830 m	MPC · JPL
350209	2012 RH_{8}	—	December 22, 2005	Kitt Peak	Spacewatch	MAS	1.0 km	MPC · JPL
350210	2012 RQ_{12}	—	December 5, 2002	Socorro	LINEAR	·	1 km	MPC · JPL
350211	2012 RO_{22}	—	April 10, 2005	Kitt Peak	Spacewatch	·	2.3 km	MPC · JPL
350212	2012 RD_{25}	—	October 24, 2005	Mauna Kea	A. Boattini	L5	9.4 km	MPC · JPL
350213	2012 RK_{27}	—	July 5, 2003	Kitt Peak	Spacewatch	·	2.4 km	MPC · JPL
350214	2012 RU_{33}	—	November 16, 2009	Kitt Peak	Spacewatch	·	710 m	MPC · JPL
350215	2012 RW_{40}	—	August 17, 2006	Palomar	NEAT	VER	3.3 km	MPC · JPL
350216	2012 SV_{17}	—	October 20, 2007	Mount Lemmon	Mount Lemmon Survey	·	2.8 km	MPC · JPL
350217	2012 SW_{17}	—	January 14, 2010	WISE	WISE	·	4.4 km	MPC · JPL
350218	2012 SW_{18}	—	September 18, 2006	Kitt Peak	Spacewatch	·	3.2 km	MPC · JPL
350219	2012 SJ_{19}	—	May 3, 2006	Mount Lemmon	Mount Lemmon Survey	·	2.5 km	MPC · JPL
350220	2012 SV_{22}	—	October 13, 1999	Apache Point	SDSS	·	670 m	MPC · JPL
350221	2012 SN_{27}	—	December 30, 2005	Kitt Peak	Spacewatch	MAS	750 m	MPC · JPL
350222	2012 SM_{54}	—	September 22, 2006	Catalina	CSS	EOS	2.5 km	MPC · JPL
350223	2012 SH_{55}	—	November 17, 2004	Campo Imperatore	CINEOS	·	2.9 km	MPC · JPL
350224	2012 SJ_{62}	—	August 29, 2005	Palomar	NEAT	V	540 m	MPC · JPL
350225	2012 TU_{9}	—	September 18, 1995	Kitt Peak	Spacewatch	·	1.5 km	MPC · JPL
350226	2012 TF_{11}	—	October 19, 2003	Palomar	NEAT	·	4.1 km	MPC · JPL
350227	2012 TK_{12}	—	September 14, 2007	Anderson Mesa	LONEOS	HOF	2.9 km	MPC · JPL
350228	2012 TS_{17}	—	April 8, 2002	Kitt Peak	Spacewatch	·	1.7 km	MPC · JPL
350229	2012 TV_{18}	—	October 6, 1996	Kitt Peak	Spacewatch	·	1.9 km	MPC · JPL
350230	2012 TW_{26}	—	October 7, 2008	Catalina	CSS	·	2.1 km	MPC · JPL
350231	2012 TY_{26}	—	December 4, 1999	Kitt Peak	Spacewatch	·	660 m	MPC · JPL
350232	2012 TZ_{33}	—	December 15, 2001	Socorro	LINEAR	HYG	3.7 km	MPC · JPL
350233	2012 TW_{47}	—	September 18, 2003	Kitt Peak	Spacewatch	·	1.6 km	MPC · JPL
350234	2012 TS_{56}	—	April 25, 2004	Kitt Peak	Spacewatch	EOS	2.7 km	MPC · JPL
350235	2012 TG_{57}	—	October 20, 2003	Kitt Peak	Spacewatch	HNS	1.3 km	MPC · JPL
350236	2012 TR_{57}	—	April 26, 2001	Kitt Peak	Spacewatch	·	2.4 km	MPC · JPL
350237	2012 TY_{57}	—	September 26, 2003	Apache Point	SDSS	·	1.4 km	MPC · JPL
350238	2012 TF_{68}	—	March 23, 2004	Kitt Peak	Spacewatch	VER	3.5 km	MPC · JPL
350239	2012 TJ_{68}	—	February 24, 2006	Kitt Peak	Spacewatch	·	1.1 km	MPC · JPL
350240	2012 TF_{69}	—	September 18, 2003	Kitt Peak	Spacewatch	·	1.9 km	MPC · JPL
350241	2012 TJ_{71}	—	September 19, 2003	Palomar	NEAT	·	1.9 km	MPC · JPL
350242	2012 TX_{71}	—	September 18, 2003	Kitt Peak	Spacewatch	·	1.6 km	MPC · JPL
350243	2012 TZ_{78}	—	April 22, 2002	Palomar	NEAT	·	1.4 km	MPC · JPL
350244	2012 TD_{80}	—	October 19, 2003	Kitt Peak	Spacewatch	AEO	1.3 km	MPC · JPL
350245	2012 TE_{80}	—	December 18, 2001	Socorro	LINEAR	NYS	1.4 km	MPC · JPL
350246	2012 TX_{88}	—	July 13, 2001	Palomar	NEAT	·	1.6 km	MPC · JPL
350247	2012 TL_{89}	—	October 24, 1995	Kitt Peak	Spacewatch	·	670 m	MPC · JPL
350248	2012 TN_{89}	—	February 21, 2007	Mount Lemmon	Mount Lemmon Survey	·	730 m	MPC · JPL
350249	2012 TO_{89}	—	September 9, 2008	Mount Lemmon	Mount Lemmon Survey	·	2.2 km	MPC · JPL
350250	2012 TR_{99}	—	September 20, 2006	Kitt Peak	Spacewatch	HYG	2.7 km	MPC · JPL
350251	2012 TM_{100}	—	June 29, 2001	Anderson Mesa	LONEOS	·	1.2 km	MPC · JPL
350252	2012 TD_{125}	—	September 19, 2003	Campo Imperatore	CINEOS	·	2.1 km	MPC · JPL
350253	2012 TS_{125}	—	November 16, 2003	Catalina	CSS	·	2.5 km	MPC · JPL
350254	2012 TG_{131}	—	April 8, 2006	Kitt Peak	Spacewatch	·	2.2 km	MPC · JPL
350255	2012 TE_{145}	—	May 7, 2010	Mount Lemmon	Mount Lemmon Survey	·	3.5 km	MPC · JPL
350256	2012 TQ_{148}	—	November 19, 2001	Socorro	LINEAR	·	4.8 km	MPC · JPL
350257	2012 TG_{149}	—	May 15, 2004	Siding Spring	SSS	·	1.3 km	MPC · JPL
350258	2012 TU_{151}	—	February 21, 2007	Mount Lemmon	Mount Lemmon Survey	·	570 m	MPC · JPL
350259	2012 TV_{155}	—	September 4, 2008	Kitt Peak	Spacewatch	fast	1.5 km	MPC · JPL
350260	2012 TL_{169}	—	December 14, 1999	Socorro	LINEAR	·	2.2 km	MPC · JPL
350261	2012 TB_{175}	—	February 16, 2004	Kitt Peak	Spacewatch	·	4.8 km	MPC · JPL
350262	2012 TA_{186}	—	August 25, 2003	Bergisch Gladbach	W. Bickel	·	2.1 km	MPC · JPL
350263	2012 TO_{186}	—	April 24, 2004	Kitt Peak	Spacewatch	·	1.7 km	MPC · JPL
350264	2012 TG_{187}	—	November 21, 2003	Socorro	LINEAR	·	2.7 km	MPC · JPL
350265	2012 TL_{187}	—	October 27, 2003	Kitt Peak	Spacewatch	·	2.5 km	MPC · JPL
350266	2012 TX_{189}	—	November 17, 1995	Kitt Peak	Spacewatch	·	4.5 km	MPC · JPL
350267	2012 TQ_{193}	—	March 18, 2010	Mount Lemmon	Mount Lemmon Survey	·	2.5 km	MPC · JPL
350268	2012 TY_{193}	—	August 22, 2007	Kitt Peak	Spacewatch	·	2.6 km	MPC · JPL
350269	2012 TD_{194}	—	April 28, 2004	Kitt Peak	Spacewatch	·	3.4 km	MPC · JPL
350270	2012 TG_{196}	—	September 19, 2006	Kitt Peak	Spacewatch	·	3.1 km	MPC · JPL
350271	2012 TE_{197}	—	April 7, 2005	Kitt Peak	Spacewatch	NAE	2.5 km	MPC · JPL
350272	2012 TP_{215}	—	December 10, 2006	Kitt Peak	Spacewatch	·	910 m	MPC · JPL
350273	2012 TR_{215}	—	October 21, 2001	Kitt Peak	Spacewatch	·	3.0 km	MPC · JPL
350274	2012 TT_{215}	—	December 14, 2004	Kitt Peak	Spacewatch	·	4.4 km	MPC · JPL
350275	2012 TD_{219}	—	September 26, 1998	Socorro	LINEAR	·	2.6 km	MPC · JPL
350276	2012 TO_{230}	—	July 19, 2004	Siding Spring	SSS	H	700 m	MPC · JPL
350277	2012 TR_{232}	—	October 9, 1999	Socorro	LINEAR	JUN	1.2 km	MPC · JPL
350278	2012 TU_{232}	—	September 29, 2005	Catalina	CSS	·	3.0 km	MPC · JPL
350279	2012 TX_{232}	—	October 7, 2008	Catalina	CSS	EUN	4.7 km	MPC · JPL
350280	2012 TK_{241}	—	September 12, 1994	Kitt Peak	Spacewatch	·	1.7 km	MPC · JPL
350281	2012 TA_{246}	—	September 22, 2001	Kitt Peak	Spacewatch	NYS	940 m	MPC · JPL
350282	2012 TD_{255}	—	January 13, 2005	Kitt Peak	Spacewatch	·	1.8 km	MPC · JPL
350283	2012 TD_{256}	—	February 4, 2009	Catalina	CSS	·	2.5 km	MPC · JPL
350284	2012 TK_{285}	—	September 27, 2003	Socorro	LINEAR	·	1.7 km	MPC · JPL
350285	2012 TE_{286}	—	September 12, 2001	Kitt Peak	Spacewatch	EOS	2.0 km	MPC · JPL
350286	2012 TL_{286}	—	September 29, 2003	Kitt Peak	Spacewatch	·	1.6 km	MPC · JPL
350287	2012 TQ_{286}	—	August 19, 2003	Campo Imperatore	CINEOS	·	1.6 km	MPC · JPL
350288	2012 TX_{290}	—	November 20, 2001	Socorro	LINEAR	·	2.9 km	MPC · JPL
350289	2012 TT_{293}	—	December 14, 2001	Socorro	LINEAR	·	3.6 km	MPC · JPL
350290	2012 TL_{294}	—	April 4, 2005	Mount Lemmon	Mount Lemmon Survey	EOS	1.8 km	MPC · JPL
350291	2012 TW_{294}	—	October 20, 1995	Kitt Peak	Spacewatch	·	1.8 km	MPC · JPL
350292	2012 TB_{296}	—	March 13, 2005	Catalina	CSS	·	2.8 km	MPC · JPL
350293	2012 TX_{296}	—	October 2, 1999	Ondřejov	L. Kotková	·	1.4 km	MPC · JPL
350294	2012 TQ_{306}	—	September 12, 2001	Socorro	LINEAR	V	890 m	MPC · JPL
350295	2012 TU_{310}	—	January 24, 2003	Palomar	NEAT	·	3.2 km	MPC · JPL
350296	2012 TA_{311}	—	June 11, 2010	Mount Lemmon	Mount Lemmon Survey	EOS	2.7 km	MPC · JPL
350297	2012 TL_{312}	—	July 16, 2001	Anderson Mesa	LONEOS	·	1.2 km	MPC · JPL
350298	2012 TM_{312}	—	September 21, 2001	Palomar	NEAT	TIR	3.6 km	MPC · JPL
350299	2012 TY_{313}	—	November 5, 1991	Kitt Peak	Spacewatch	(5)	1.5 km	MPC · JPL
350300	2012 UJ_{31}	—	October 18, 2003	Kitt Peak	Spacewatch	·	3.1 km	MPC · JPL

== 350301–350400 ==
back to top

Designation			Discovery			Properties		Ref
Permanent	Provisional	Named after	Date	Site	Discoverer(s)	Category	Diam.	Ref
350301	2012 UR_{32}	—	September 20, 2001	Socorro	LINEAR	·	1.0 km	MPC · JPL
350302	2012 UQ_{33}	—	March 9, 2007	Kitt Peak	Spacewatch	·	1.2 km	MPC · JPL
350303	2012 UW_{35}	—	June 18, 2005	Mount Lemmon	Mount Lemmon Survey	·	770 m	MPC · JPL
350304	2012 UT_{38}	—	May 20, 2005	Mount Lemmon	Mount Lemmon Survey	·	760 m	MPC · JPL
350305	2012 UD_{42}	—	May 14, 2004	Kitt Peak	Spacewatch	·	3.4 km	MPC · JPL
350306	2012 UP_{43}	—	January 19, 2001	Kitt Peak	Spacewatch	·	1.4 km	MPC · JPL
350307	2012 US_{43}	—	December 20, 1995	Kitt Peak	Spacewatch	·	1.5 km	MPC · JPL
350308	2012 US_{46}	—	April 12, 2005	Kitt Peak	Spacewatch	KOR	1.6 km	MPC · JPL
350309	2012 UZ_{46}	—	February 6, 2002	Kitt Peak	Spacewatch	·	1 km	MPC · JPL
350310	2012 UR_{48}	—	October 25, 2003	Kitt Peak	Spacewatch	WIT	880 m	MPC · JPL
350311	2012 UK_{52}	—	October 8, 2001	Palomar	NEAT	V	670 m	MPC · JPL
350312	2012 UW_{52}	—	January 26, 2006	Mount Lemmon	Mount Lemmon Survey	(5)	1.5 km	MPC · JPL
350313	2012 UB_{55}	—	May 7, 2005	Kitt Peak	Spacewatch	BRA	1.6 km	MPC · JPL
350314	2012 UJ_{55}	—	October 30, 2007	Kitt Peak	Spacewatch	·	3.5 km	MPC · JPL
350315	2012 UW_{58}	—	September 26, 2001	Socorro	LINEAR	·	2.8 km	MPC · JPL
350316	2012 US_{59}	—	July 10, 2004	Palomar	NEAT	·	1.7 km	MPC · JPL
350317	2012 UG_{61}	—	January 17, 2005	Kitt Peak	Spacewatch	·	1.6 km	MPC · JPL
350318	2012 UY_{61}	—	September 17, 1995	Kitt Peak	Spacewatch	THM	2.1 km	MPC · JPL
350319	2012 UF_{62}	—	November 3, 2004	Kitt Peak	Spacewatch	·	970 m	MPC · JPL
350320	2012 UD_{63}	—	September 21, 2003	Anderson Mesa	LONEOS	·	2.2 km	MPC · JPL
350321	2012 UZ_{65}	—	March 18, 2010	Kitt Peak	Spacewatch	HOF	2.7 km	MPC · JPL
350322	2012 UA_{66}	—	October 7, 2004	Kitt Peak	Spacewatch	·	1.1 km	MPC · JPL
350323	2012 UN_{66}	—	February 12, 2002	Socorro	LINEAR	·	1.2 km	MPC · JPL
350324	2012 UW_{74}	—	December 12, 2009	Pla D'Arguines	R. Ferrando	·	790 m	MPC · JPL
350325	2012 UY_{74}	—	December 24, 2005	Kitt Peak	Spacewatch	3:2 · SHU	4.5 km	MPC · JPL
350326	2012 UU_{76}	—	September 20, 2001	Socorro	LINEAR	·	2.4 km	MPC · JPL
350327	2012 UM_{77}	—	April 20, 1993	Kitt Peak	Spacewatch	(21885)	3.6 km	MPC · JPL
350328	2012 UU_{77}	—	August 26, 2005	Palomar	NEAT	·	870 m	MPC · JPL
350329	2012 UG_{78}	—	April 30, 2006	Kitt Peak	Spacewatch	·	3.2 km	MPC · JPL
350330	2012 UV_{88}	—	March 11, 2005	Mount Lemmon	Mount Lemmon Survey	·	2.3 km	MPC · JPL
350331	2012 UP_{89}	—	September 7, 1999	Socorro	LINEAR	·	1.6 km	MPC · JPL
350332	2012 UQ_{89}	—	November 10, 1996	Kitt Peak	Spacewatch	·	2.4 km	MPC · JPL
350333	2012 UM_{90}	—	November 1, 1999	Kitt Peak	Spacewatch	·	1.6 km	MPC · JPL
350334	2012 UZ_{97}	—	September 10, 2007	Catalina	CSS	·	3.5 km	MPC · JPL
350335	2012 UG_{99}	—	February 22, 2003	Anderson Mesa	LONEOS	THM	2.4 km	MPC · JPL
350336	2012 UG_{100}	—	September 26, 2003	Desert Eagle	W. K. Y. Yeung	MRX	850 m	MPC · JPL
350337	2012 UO_{100}	—	March 16, 2005	Mount Lemmon	Mount Lemmon Survey	·	2.0 km	MPC · JPL
350338	2012 UE_{102}	—	November 14, 1995	Kitt Peak	Spacewatch	·	1.9 km	MPC · JPL
350339	2012 UO_{102}	—	April 16, 2005	Kitt Peak	Spacewatch	·	2.2 km	MPC · JPL
350340	2012 UG_{103}	—	February 25, 2009	Catalina	CSS	·	1.7 km	MPC · JPL
350341	2012 UQ_{103}	—	November 23, 2003	Kitt Peak	Spacewatch	·	1.7 km	MPC · JPL
350342	2012 UT_{103}	—	December 16, 1995	Kitt Peak	Spacewatch	·	4.1 km	MPC · JPL
350343	2012 UJ_{105}	—	May 18, 2010	WISE	WISE	·	4.1 km	MPC · JPL
350344	2012 UQ_{105}	—	November 6, 1999	Eskridge	G. Bell, G. Hug	·	2.2 km	MPC · JPL
350345	2012 UD_{108}	—	March 18, 2004	Kitt Peak	Spacewatch	·	3.0 km	MPC · JPL
350346	2012 UL_{108}	—	October 10, 1999	Kitt Peak	Spacewatch	·	1.6 km	MPC · JPL
350347	2012 UM_{108}	—	October 10, 2002	Palomar	NEAT	·	680 m	MPC · JPL
350348	2012 UO_{109}	—	December 6, 2007	Mount Lemmon	Mount Lemmon Survey	·	2.6 km	MPC · JPL
350349	2012 UP_{109}	—	December 19, 1995	Kitt Peak	Spacewatch	·	1.7 km	MPC · JPL
350350	2012 UX_{110}	—	January 7, 2006	Kitt Peak	Spacewatch	NYS	1.6 km	MPC · JPL
350351	2012 UT_{118}	—	November 24, 2001	Socorro	LINEAR	·	4.0 km	MPC · JPL
350352	2012 UE_{119}	—	December 14, 2003	Kitt Peak	Spacewatch	·	2.2 km	MPC · JPL
350353	2012 UL_{119}	—	October 11, 2007	Mount Lemmon	Mount Lemmon Survey	·	2.5 km	MPC · JPL
350354	2012 UQ_{121}	—	October 10, 2005	Catalina	CSS	·	850 m	MPC · JPL
350355	2012 UJ_{123}	—	December 17, 2001	Kitt Peak	Spacewatch	·	1.0 km	MPC · JPL
350356	2012 UK_{124}	—	November 8, 2008	Mount Lemmon	Mount Lemmon Survey	·	2.0 km	MPC · JPL
350357	2012 UO_{124}	—	January 27, 2003	Socorro	LINEAR	·	3.6 km	MPC · JPL
350358	2012 UU_{124}	—	January 15, 2004	Kitt Peak	Spacewatch	·	1.7 km	MPC · JPL
350359	2012 UF_{127}	—	October 2, 2003	Kitt Peak	Spacewatch	·	1.8 km	MPC · JPL
350360	2012 UJ_{131}	—	September 26, 2001	Socorro	LINEAR	NYS	1.1 km	MPC · JPL
350361	2012 UC_{135}	—	February 17, 2007	Mount Lemmon	Mount Lemmon Survey	·	2.2 km	MPC · JPL
350362	2012 UR_{135}	—	October 18, 2003	Palomar	NEAT	·	2.6 km	MPC · JPL
350363	2012 UQ_{137}	—	December 19, 2003	Kitt Peak	Spacewatch	·	2.9 km	MPC · JPL
350364	2012 UL_{143}	—	August 20, 2006	Palomar	NEAT	·	3.8 km	MPC · JPL
350365	2012 UF_{145}	—	March 9, 2003	Kitt Peak	Spacewatch	·	1.3 km	MPC · JPL
350366	2012 UN_{146}	—	February 12, 2010	WISE	WISE	·	5.1 km	MPC · JPL
350367	2012 UX_{150}	—	November 11, 2001	Kitt Peak	Spacewatch	·	2.9 km	MPC · JPL
350368	2012 UG_{151}	—	July 28, 2007	Mauna Kea	P. A. Wiegert, N. I. Hasan	·	1.7 km	MPC · JPL
350369	2012 UF_{152}	—	December 30, 2005	Kitt Peak	Spacewatch	·	1.6 km	MPC · JPL
350370	2012 UG_{152}	—	October 22, 1998	Caussols	ODAS	·	2.8 km	MPC · JPL
350371	2012 UZ_{152}	—	October 27, 2005	Kitt Peak	Spacewatch	·	720 m	MPC · JPL
350372	2012 UL_{153}	—	October 3, 2006	Mount Lemmon	Mount Lemmon Survey	·	3.0 km	MPC · JPL
350373	2012 UO_{153}	—	January 7, 2010	Kitt Peak	Spacewatch	NYS	970 m	MPC · JPL
350374	2012 UR_{153}	—	November 23, 1998	Kitt Peak	Spacewatch	HOF	2.8 km	MPC · JPL
350375	2012 UC_{154}	—	November 30, 2005	Kitt Peak	Spacewatch	NYS	1.2 km	MPC · JPL
350376	2012 UP_{154}	—	September 7, 1999	Socorro	LINEAR	·	1.3 km	MPC · JPL
350377	2012 UQ_{155}	—	September 19, 2003	Kitt Peak	Spacewatch	·	1.6 km	MPC · JPL
350378	2012 UB_{160}	—	January 5, 2003	Socorro	LINEAR	·	980 m	MPC · JPL
350379	2012 UG_{160}	—	June 4, 2003	Kitt Peak	Spacewatch	·	1.6 km	MPC · JPL
350380	2012 UZ_{160}	—	March 16, 2004	Catalina	CSS	·	3.6 km	MPC · JPL
350381	2012 UL_{162}	—	December 18, 2001	Socorro	LINEAR	MAS	800 m	MPC · JPL
350382	2012 UF_{164}	—	November 21, 2003	Junk Bond	D. Healy	·	2.3 km	MPC · JPL
350383	2012 VM_{4}	—	January 17, 2005	Kitt Peak	Spacewatch	·	1.7 km	MPC · JPL
350384	2012 VS_{5}	—	August 31, 2002	Kitt Peak	Spacewatch	KOR	1.4 km	MPC · JPL
350385	2012 VT_{8}	—	October 12, 1998	Kitt Peak	Spacewatch	·	2.3 km	MPC · JPL
350386	2012 VF_{10}	—	February 5, 2005	Palomar	NEAT	EUN	1.7 km	MPC · JPL
350387	2012 VP_{10}	—	April 15, 1997	Kitt Peak	Spacewatch	WIT	1.1 km	MPC · JPL
350388	2012 VT_{10}	—	October 3, 1997	Caussols	ODAS	·	980 m	MPC · JPL
350389	2012 VM_{11}	—	October 10, 2007	Mount Lemmon	Mount Lemmon Survey	EOS	1.7 km	MPC · JPL
350390	2012 VV_{12}	—	October 6, 2008	Mount Lemmon	Mount Lemmon Survey	·	1.9 km	MPC · JPL
350391	2012 VJ_{14}	—	November 20, 2008	Kitt Peak	Spacewatch	·	3.5 km	MPC · JPL
350392	2012 VA_{17}	—	September 26, 2005	Goodricke-Pigott	R. A. Tucker	·	880 m	MPC · JPL
350393	2012 VD_{18}	—	October 23, 2006	Kitt Peak	Spacewatch	·	3.4 km	MPC · JPL
350394	2012 VQ_{18}	—	December 31, 2008	Catalina	CSS	·	2.2 km	MPC · JPL
350395	2012 VR_{18}	—	September 25, 2006	Mount Lemmon	Mount Lemmon Survey	·	3.3 km	MPC · JPL
350396	2012 VF_{19}	—	April 9, 2005	Mount Lemmon	Mount Lemmon Survey	MRX	1.3 km	MPC · JPL
350397	2012 VT_{21}	—	April 22, 2007	Mount Lemmon	Mount Lemmon Survey	·	1.3 km	MPC · JPL
350398	2012 VR_{24}	—	September 29, 2003	Kitt Peak	Spacewatch	·	1.5 km	MPC · JPL
350399	2012 VA_{25}	—	December 19, 1998	Kitt Peak	Spacewatch	·	3.1 km	MPC · JPL
350400	2012 VR_{26}	—	October 27, 2008	Kitt Peak	Spacewatch	·	1.3 km	MPC · JPL

== 350401–350500 ==
back to top

Designation			Discovery			Properties		Ref
Permanent	Provisional	Named after	Date	Site	Discoverer(s)	Category	Diam.	Ref
350401	2012 VT_{30}	—	December 11, 2004	Kitt Peak	Spacewatch	(5)	1.5 km	MPC · JPL
350402	2012 VL_{31}	—	February 11, 2004	Kitt Peak	Spacewatch	KOR	1.5 km	MPC · JPL
350403	2012 VG_{32}	—	November 4, 2007	Kitt Peak	Spacewatch	·	1.6 km	MPC · JPL
350404	2012 VN_{32}	—	September 8, 1999	Catalina	CSS	·	1.2 km	MPC · JPL
350405	2012 VO_{32}	—	September 30, 2003	Kitt Peak	Spacewatch	·	1.8 km	MPC · JPL
350406	2012 VE_{35}	—	January 15, 2005	Kitt Peak	Spacewatch	(29841)	1.6 km	MPC · JPL
350407	2012 VO_{36}	—	December 4, 2005	Kitt Peak	Spacewatch	·	1.1 km	MPC · JPL
350408	2012 VS_{38}	—	November 30, 1999	Kitt Peak	Spacewatch	·	1.8 km	MPC · JPL
350409	2012 VP_{39}	—	September 12, 2007	Mount Lemmon	Mount Lemmon Survey	·	1.7 km	MPC · JPL
350410	2012 VO_{40}	—	September 15, 1998	Kitt Peak	Spacewatch	·	1.8 km	MPC · JPL
350411	2012 VS_{41}	—	October 22, 2003	Kitt Peak	Spacewatch	·	2.1 km	MPC · JPL
350412	2012 VN_{54}	—	May 3, 2005	Kitt Peak	Spacewatch	·	3.2 km	MPC · JPL
350413	2012 VT_{56}	—	September 19, 2001	Socorro	LINEAR	·	2.2 km	MPC · JPL
350414	2012 VH_{59}	—	January 19, 2009	Mount Lemmon	Mount Lemmon Survey	·	3.6 km	MPC · JPL
350415	2012 VN_{60}	—	April 20, 2006	Kitt Peak	Spacewatch	·	1.4 km	MPC · JPL
350416	2012 VF_{61}	—	July 8, 2003	Palomar	NEAT	·	1.5 km	MPC · JPL
350417	2012 VH_{62}	—	January 15, 2005	Kitt Peak	Spacewatch	·	1.8 km	MPC · JPL
350418	2012 VP_{63}	—	September 19, 2006	Kitt Peak	Spacewatch	VER	2.6 km	MPC · JPL
350419	2012 VO_{64}	—	October 18, 2003	Kitt Peak	Spacewatch	·	1.8 km	MPC · JPL
350420	2012 VT_{65}	—	November 20, 2001	Socorro	LINEAR	·	1.1 km	MPC · JPL
350421	2012 VF_{72}	—	February 13, 2010	Catalina	CSS	·	770 m	MPC · JPL
350422	2012 VK_{72}	—	October 11, 2001	Kitt Peak	Spacewatch	·	2.5 km	MPC · JPL
350423	2012 VO_{72}	—	June 11, 2004	Kitt Peak	Spacewatch	·	3.2 km	MPC · JPL
350424	2012 VU_{72}	—	September 12, 2007	Anderson Mesa	LONEOS	·	2.1 km	MPC · JPL
350425	2012 VX_{73}	—	September 26, 2006	Catalina	CSS	·	4.7 km	MPC · JPL
350426	2012 VC_{75}	—	May 20, 2006	Kitt Peak	Spacewatch	·	1.3 km	MPC · JPL
350427	2012 VJ_{80}	—	November 4, 2007	Kitt Peak	Spacewatch	·	2.7 km	MPC · JPL
350428	2012 VQ_{82}	—	October 24, 2003	Kitt Peak	Spacewatch	·	1.8 km	MPC · JPL
350429	2012 VY_{82}	—	November 30, 2008	Kitt Peak	Spacewatch	(5)	1.5 km	MPC · JPL
350430	2012 VO_{83}	—	January 26, 2001	Kitt Peak	Spacewatch	·	1.5 km	MPC · JPL
350431	2012 VG_{84}	—	March 13, 2007	Mount Lemmon	Mount Lemmon Survey	·	1.6 km	MPC · JPL
350432	2012 VO_{84}	—	September 17, 2006	Anderson Mesa	LONEOS	LIX	4.4 km	MPC · JPL
350433	2012 VV_{85}	—	March 25, 2006	Kitt Peak	Spacewatch	·	2.1 km	MPC · JPL
350434	2012 VH_{91}	—	August 19, 2002	Palomar	NEAT	·	2.7 km	MPC · JPL
350435	2012 VO_{91}	—	September 14, 2006	Catalina	CSS	·	2.8 km	MPC · JPL
350436	2012 VT_{96}	—	April 19, 2006	Kitt Peak	Spacewatch	MAR	1.2 km	MPC · JPL
350437	2012 WK	—	September 25, 2006	Catalina	CSS	·	3.9 km	MPC · JPL
350438	2012 WM	—	November 21, 2003	Socorro	LINEAR	·	3.0 km	MPC · JPL
350439	2012 WF_{1}	—	January 1, 2009	Mount Lemmon	Mount Lemmon Survey	·	1.9 km	MPC · JPL
350440	2012 WW_{7}	—	August 29, 2006	Catalina	CSS	TEL	1.9 km	MPC · JPL
350441	5073 T-3	—	October 16, 1977	Palomar	C. J. van Houten, I. van Houten-Groeneveld, T. Gehrels	·	940 m	MPC · JPL
350442	1979 ME_{2}	—	June 25, 1979	Siding Spring	E. F. Helin, S. J. Bus	·	1.7 km	MPC · JPL
350443	1993 TA_{26}	—	October 9, 1993	La Silla	E. W. Elst	MAS	790 m	MPC · JPL
350444	1994 XZ_{1}	—	December 1, 1994	Kitt Peak	Spacewatch	V	630 m	MPC · JPL
350445	1995 CC_{6}	—	February 1, 1995	Kitt Peak	Spacewatch	·	1.2 km	MPC · JPL
350446	1995 FJ_{4}	—	March 23, 1995	Kitt Peak	Spacewatch	·	1.8 km	MPC · JPL
350447	1995 SQ_{73}	—	September 29, 1995	Kitt Peak	Spacewatch	·	3.0 km	MPC · JPL
350448	1995 UN_{31}	—	October 21, 1995	Kitt Peak	Spacewatch	·	1.2 km	MPC · JPL
350449	1995 YC_{12}	—	December 18, 1995	Kitt Peak	Spacewatch	EUN	1.6 km	MPC · JPL
350450	1996 ET_{13}	—	March 11, 1996	Kitt Peak	Spacewatch	·	2.9 km	MPC · JPL
350451	1996 RH_{6}	—	September 5, 1996	Kitt Peak	Spacewatch	L4	9.8 km	MPC · JPL
350452	1996 TZ_{34}	—	October 11, 1996	Kitt Peak	Spacewatch	V	920 m	MPC · JPL
350453	1996 XM_{14}	—	December 9, 1996	Kitt Peak	Spacewatch	·	3.0 km	MPC · JPL
350454	1997 GW_{17}	—	April 3, 1997	Socorro	LINEAR	·	1.2 km	MPC · JPL
350455	1997 SB_{5}	—	September 27, 1997	Mount Hopkins	C. W. Hergenrother	V	560 m	MPC · JPL
350456	1997 TW_{10}	—	October 3, 1997	Kitt Peak	Spacewatch	·	1.1 km	MPC · JPL
350457	1997 UZ_{15}	—	October 11, 1997	Kitt Peak	Spacewatch	KOR	1.2 km	MPC · JPL
350458	1997 WK_{6}	—	November 23, 1997	Kitt Peak	Spacewatch	MAS	720 m	MPC · JPL
350459	1998 FQ_{8}	—	March 21, 1998	Kitt Peak	Spacewatch	·	1.6 km	MPC · JPL
350460	1998 HC	—	April 17, 1998	Kitt Peak	Spacewatch	MAS	910 m	MPC · JPL
350461	1998 HE_{9}	—	April 17, 1998	Kitt Peak	Spacewatch	·	2.1 km	MPC · JPL
350462	1998 KG_{3}	—	May 22, 1998	Kitt Peak	Spacewatch	AMO	140 m	MPC · JPL
350463	1998 QA	—	August 17, 1998	Socorro	LINEAR	T_{j} (2.95)	2.6 km	MPC · JPL
350464	1998 QN_{47}	—	August 17, 1998	Socorro	LINEAR	·	930 m	MPC · JPL
350465	1998 QM_{111}	—	August 27, 1998	Kitt Peak	Spacewatch	·	1.7 km	MPC · JPL
350466	1998 SR_{68}	—	September 19, 1998	Socorro	LINEAR	·	1.6 km	MPC · JPL
350467	1998 SV_{113}	—	September 26, 1998	Socorro	LINEAR	·	1.1 km	MPC · JPL
350468	1998 TF_{1}	—	October 12, 1998	Kitt Peak	Spacewatch	NEM	2.0 km	MPC · JPL
350469	1998 TO_{36}	—	October 12, 1998	Kitt Peak	Spacewatch	·	2.0 km	MPC · JPL
350470	1998 WX_{35}	—	November 19, 1998	Kitt Peak	Spacewatch	·	3.3 km	MPC · JPL
350471	1998 WC_{37}	—	November 21, 1998	Kitt Peak	Spacewatch	·	920 m	MPC · JPL
350472	1998 YS_{13}	—	December 19, 1998	Kitt Peak	Spacewatch	·	730 m	MPC · JPL
350473	1999 DG_{1}	—	February 17, 1999	Socorro	LINEAR	H	810 m	MPC · JPL
350474	1999 FH_{20}	—	March 10, 1999	Kitt Peak	Spacewatch	·	1.9 km	MPC · JPL
350475	1999 RO_{70}	—	September 7, 1999	Socorro	LINEAR	·	2.1 km	MPC · JPL
350476	1999 RH_{73}	—	September 7, 1999	Socorro	LINEAR	(5)	1.2 km	MPC · JPL
350477	1999 RP_{164}	—	September 9, 1999	Socorro	LINEAR	·	1.3 km	MPC · JPL
350478	1999 RN_{211}	—	September 8, 1999	Socorro	LINEAR	·	1.4 km	MPC · JPL
350479	1999 RT_{241}	—	September 14, 1999	Catalina	CSS	·	1.0 km	MPC · JPL
350480	1999 SB	—	September 16, 1999	Prescott	P. G. Comba	(5)	1.3 km	MPC · JPL
350481	1999 TL_{2}	—	September 14, 1999	Socorro	LINEAR	·	2.1 km	MPC · JPL
350482	1999 TS_{29}	—	September 30, 1999	Catalina	CSS	(5)	1.2 km	MPC · JPL
350483	1999 TM_{72}	—	October 9, 1999	Kitt Peak	Spacewatch	EUN	1.3 km	MPC · JPL
350484	1999 TP_{109}	—	October 4, 1999	Socorro	LINEAR	·	1.7 km	MPC · JPL
350485	1999 TY_{120}	—	October 4, 1999	Socorro	LINEAR	·	1.3 km	MPC · JPL
350486	1999 TV_{125}	—	October 4, 1999	Socorro	LINEAR	·	1.7 km	MPC · JPL
350487	1999 TL_{137}	—	October 6, 1999	Socorro	LINEAR	·	2.3 km	MPC · JPL
350488	1999 TF_{152}	—	October 7, 1999	Socorro	LINEAR	(5)	1.6 km	MPC · JPL
350489	1999 UR_{11}	—	October 29, 1999	Kitt Peak	Spacewatch	·	2.1 km	MPC · JPL
350490	1999 UG_{29}	—	October 31, 1999	Kitt Peak	Spacewatch	·	1.3 km	MPC · JPL
350491	1999 VW_{8}	—	November 9, 1999	Baton Rouge	W. R. Cooney Jr.	·	1.4 km	MPC · JPL
350492	1999 VP_{38}	—	November 10, 1999	Socorro	LINEAR	·	1.7 km	MPC · JPL
350493	1999 VL_{41}	—	November 2, 1999	Kitt Peak	Spacewatch	BRG	1.4 km	MPC · JPL
350494	1999 VB_{77}	—	November 5, 1999	Kitt Peak	Spacewatch	·	1.3 km	MPC · JPL
350495	1999 VC_{111}	—	November 9, 1999	Socorro	LINEAR	·	780 m	MPC · JPL
350496	1999 VE_{133}	—	November 10, 1999	Kitt Peak	Spacewatch	·	1.5 km	MPC · JPL
350497	1999 VB_{145}	—	November 13, 1999	Catalina	CSS	(5)	1.3 km	MPC · JPL
350498	1999 VQ_{175}	—	November 11, 1999	Kitt Peak	Spacewatch	·	1.8 km	MPC · JPL
350499	1999 VE_{197}	—	November 2, 1999	Catalina	CSS	·	1.6 km	MPC · JPL
350500	1999 VE_{207}	—	November 11, 1999	Kitt Peak	Spacewatch	·	890 m	MPC · JPL

== 350501–350600 ==
back to top

Designation			Discovery			Properties		Ref
Permanent	Provisional	Named after	Date	Site	Discoverer(s)	Category	Diam.	Ref
350501	1999 VS_{210}	—	November 13, 1999	Catalina	CSS	(5)	1.3 km	MPC · JPL
350502	1999 WQ_{17}	—	November 30, 1999	Kitt Peak	Spacewatch	·	1.5 km	MPC · JPL
350503	1999 XX_{8}	—	December 5, 1999	Socorro	LINEAR	BAR	1.7 km	MPC · JPL
350504	1999 XR_{54}	—	December 7, 1999	Socorro	LINEAR	·	3.1 km	MPC · JPL
350505	1999 XS_{111}	—	December 7, 1999	Socorro	LINEAR	JUN	1.1 km	MPC · JPL
350506	1999 XP_{131}	—	December 12, 1999	Socorro	LINEAR	·	1.9 km	MPC · JPL
350507	1999 XR_{163}	—	December 13, 1999	Kitt Peak	Spacewatch	ADE	2.0 km	MPC · JPL
350508	1999 XT_{226}	—	December 14, 1999	Kitt Peak	Spacewatch	·	880 m	MPC · JPL
350509 Vepřoknedlozelo	2000 AH_{204}	Vepřoknedlozelo	January 14, 2000	Kleť	M. Tichý	·	980 m	MPC · JPL
350510	2000 AN_{212}	—	January 6, 2000	Kitt Peak	Spacewatch	·	1.5 km	MPC · JPL
350511	2000 AB_{218}	—	January 3, 2000	Kitt Peak	Spacewatch	·	2.2 km	MPC · JPL
350512	2000 AP_{247}	—	January 2, 2000	Socorro	LINEAR	H	690 m	MPC · JPL
350513	2000 BG_{19}	—	January 28, 2000	Kitt Peak	Spacewatch	AMO +1km	1.8 km	MPC · JPL
350514	2000 BC_{34}	—	January 30, 2000	Kitt Peak	Spacewatch	·	1.5 km	MPC · JPL
350515	2000 BK_{38}	—	January 30, 2000	Kitt Peak	Spacewatch	MIS	2.3 km	MPC · JPL
350516	2000 BV_{40}	—	January 29, 2000	Kitt Peak	Spacewatch	·	1.4 km	MPC · JPL
350517	2000 CA_{55}	—	February 3, 2000	Socorro	LINEAR	·	2.1 km	MPC · JPL
350518	2000 CH_{72}	—	February 4, 2000	Siding Spring	R. H. McNaught	·	1.5 km	MPC · JPL
350519	2000 CS_{107}	—	February 5, 2000	Kitt Peak	M. W. Buie	·	1.6 km	MPC · JPL
350520	2000 CY_{140}	—	February 6, 2000	Kitt Peak	Spacewatch	·	760 m	MPC · JPL
350521	2000 DY_{34}	—	February 29, 2000	Socorro	LINEAR	·	3.6 km	MPC · JPL
350522	2000 DU_{88}	—	February 25, 2000	Kitt Peak	Spacewatch	·	2.2 km	MPC · JPL
350523	2000 EA_{14}	—	March 3, 2000	Catalina	CSS	APO · PHA	210 m	MPC · JPL
350524	2000 EA_{137}	—	March 12, 2000	Socorro	LINEAR	·	1.4 km	MPC · JPL
350525	2000 FC_{3}	—	March 27, 2000	Socorro	LINEAR	H	810 m	MPC · JPL
350526	2000 FZ_{13}	—	March 29, 2000	Kitt Peak	Spacewatch	·	1.1 km	MPC · JPL
350527	2000 FZ_{14}	—	March 29, 2000	Socorro	LINEAR	·	3.0 km	MPC · JPL
350528	2000 FB_{53}	—	March 30, 2000	Kitt Peak	Spacewatch	·	2.5 km	MPC · JPL
350529	2000 GQ_{88}	—	April 4, 2000	Socorro	LINEAR	DOR	3.5 km	MPC · JPL
350530	2000 JQ_{19}	—	May 4, 2000	Socorro	LINEAR	·	2.0 km	MPC · JPL
350531	2000 KE	—	May 23, 2000	Prescott	P. G. Comba	·	3.2 km	MPC · JPL
350532	2000 KL_{69}	—	May 29, 2000	Kitt Peak	Spacewatch	·	830 m	MPC · JPL
350533	2000 LC_{33}	—	June 4, 2000	Haleakala	NEAT	·	2.7 km	MPC · JPL
350534	2000 QX_{37}	—	August 24, 2000	Socorro	LINEAR	·	2.1 km	MPC · JPL
350535	2000 QY_{44}	—	August 24, 2000	Socorro	LINEAR	·	1.6 km	MPC · JPL
350536	2000 QY_{69}	—	August 29, 2000	Socorro	LINEAR	AMO	360 m	MPC · JPL
350537	2000 RS_{59}	—	September 7, 2000	Kitt Peak	Spacewatch	·	3.1 km	MPC · JPL
350538	2000 RZ_{60}	—	September 1, 2000	Socorro	LINEAR	·	1.2 km	MPC · JPL
350539	2000 RM_{90}	—	September 3, 2000	Socorro	LINEAR	·	4.7 km	MPC · JPL
350540	2000 SF_{35}	—	September 24, 2000	Socorro	LINEAR	NYS	1.3 km	MPC · JPL
350541	2000 SH_{47}	—	September 23, 2000	Socorro	LINEAR	H	870 m	MPC · JPL
350542	2000 SO_{89}	—	September 22, 2000	Elmira	Cecce, A. J.	·	1.8 km	MPC · JPL
350543	2000 SV_{97}	—	September 23, 2000	Socorro	LINEAR	·	1.4 km	MPC · JPL
350544	2000 SQ_{158}	—	September 22, 2000	Kitt Peak	Spacewatch	·	1.4 km	MPC · JPL
350545	2000 SV_{173}	—	September 3, 2000	Socorro	LINEAR	THB	2.7 km	MPC · JPL
350546	2000 SJ_{183}	—	September 20, 2000	Kitt Peak	Spacewatch	·	3.3 km	MPC · JPL
350547	2000 SG_{189}	—	September 22, 2000	Kitt Peak	Spacewatch	·	2.0 km	MPC · JPL
350548	2000 SD_{192}	—	September 24, 2000	Socorro	LINEAR	MAS	1 km	MPC · JPL
350549	2000 SO_{204}	—	September 24, 2000	Socorro	LINEAR	V	740 m	MPC · JPL
350550	2000 SH_{225}	—	September 27, 2000	Socorro	LINEAR	·	1.4 km	MPC · JPL
350551	2000 SL_{296}	—	September 23, 2000	Socorro	LINEAR	·	1.6 km	MPC · JPL
350552	2000 SN_{310}	—	September 26, 2000	Socorro	LINEAR	TIR	3.4 km	MPC · JPL
350553	2000 SL_{327}	—	September 30, 2000	Kitt Peak	Spacewatch	NYS	1.4 km	MPC · JPL
350554	2000 SE_{370}	—	August 28, 2000	Socorro	LINEAR	V	1.1 km	MPC · JPL
350555	2000 TM_{7}	—	October 1, 2000	Socorro	LINEAR	·	1.4 km	MPC · JPL
350556	2000 TG_{22}	—	October 3, 2000	Socorro	LINEAR	·	4.9 km	MPC · JPL
350557	2000 TD_{61}	—	October 2, 2000	Anderson Mesa	LONEOS	·	3.4 km	MPC · JPL
350558	2000 UM_{29}	—	October 24, 2000	Socorro	LINEAR	PHO	1.1 km	MPC · JPL
350559	2000 UE_{30}	—	October 31, 2000	Socorro	LINEAR	·	1.8 km	MPC · JPL
350560	2000 UM_{34}	—	October 24, 2000	Socorro	LINEAR	·	1.6 km	MPC · JPL
350561	2000 UR_{64}	—	October 25, 2000	Socorro	LINEAR	·	1.2 km	MPC · JPL
350562	2000 UB_{74}	—	October 2, 2000	Socorro	LINEAR	·	1.7 km	MPC · JPL
350563	2000 UN_{75}	—	October 31, 2000	Socorro	LINEAR	·	1.7 km	MPC · JPL
350564	2000 UK_{102}	—	October 25, 2000	Socorro	LINEAR	·	1.6 km	MPC · JPL
350565	2000 UN_{110}	—	October 30, 2000	Socorro	LINEAR	·	3.2 km	MPC · JPL
350566	2000 WY_{183}	—	November 30, 2000	Anderson Mesa	LONEOS	·	2.0 km	MPC · JPL
350567	2000 WM_{190}	—	November 18, 2000	Anderson Mesa	LONEOS	·	1.9 km	MPC · JPL
350568	2000 XH_{4}	—	December 1, 2000	Socorro	LINEAR	·	1.8 km	MPC · JPL
350569	2000 YY_{2}	—	December 18, 2000	Kitt Peak	Spacewatch	PHO	1.5 km	MPC · JPL
350570	2000 YU_{38}	—	December 30, 2000	Socorro	LINEAR	·	1.4 km	MPC · JPL
350571	2000 YX_{49}	—	December 30, 2000	Socorro	LINEAR	·	1.7 km	MPC · JPL
350572	2000 YR_{97}	—	December 30, 2000	Socorro	LINEAR	·	1.7 km	MPC · JPL
350573	2001 BT_{75}	—	January 26, 2001	Socorro	LINEAR	T_{j} (2.99) · EUP	7.5 km	MPC · JPL
350574	2001 BN_{83}	—	January 18, 2001	Haleakala	NEAT	L4	10 km	MPC · JPL
350575	2001 DE_{62}	—	January 26, 2001	Kitt Peak	Spacewatch	·	1.6 km	MPC · JPL
350576	2001 EH_{15}	—	March 15, 2001	Kitt Peak	Spacewatch	·	1.8 km	MPC · JPL
350577	2001 FW_{88}	—	March 26, 2001	Kitt Peak	Spacewatch	·	2.1 km	MPC · JPL
350578	2001 HG_{65}	—	April 28, 2001	Kitt Peak	Spacewatch	·	910 m	MPC · JPL
350579	2001 KX_{63}	—	May 21, 2001	Anderson Mesa	LONEOS	·	1.7 km	MPC · JPL
350580	2001 MW_{8}	—	June 19, 2001	Palomar	NEAT	·	2.6 km	MPC · JPL
350581	2001 OC_{55}	—	July 22, 2001	Palomar	NEAT	·	1.1 km	MPC · JPL
350582	2001 OU_{79}	—	July 29, 2001	Palomar	NEAT	H	570 m	MPC · JPL
350583	2001 PL_{15}	—	August 9, 2001	Palomar	NEAT	V	750 m	MPC · JPL
350584	2001 PP_{15}	—	August 9, 2001	Palomar	NEAT	·	860 m	MPC · JPL
350585	2001 PH_{16}	—	August 9, 2001	Palomar	NEAT	·	870 m	MPC · JPL
350586	2001 PZ_{42}	—	August 12, 2001	Palomar	NEAT	H	730 m	MPC · JPL
350587	2001 QR_{15}	—	August 16, 2001	Socorro	LINEAR	·	1.2 km	MPC · JPL
350588	2001 QT_{44}	—	August 16, 2001	Socorro	LINEAR	PHO	1.5 km	MPC · JPL
350589	2001 QP_{61}	—	August 16, 2001	Socorro	LINEAR	·	3.3 km	MPC · JPL
350590	2001 QU_{82}	—	August 17, 2001	Socorro	LINEAR	·	2.4 km	MPC · JPL
350591	2001 QT_{124}	—	August 19, 2001	Socorro	LINEAR	H	600 m	MPC · JPL
350592	2001 QH_{143}	—	August 21, 2001	Kitt Peak	Spacewatch	·	1.8 km	MPC · JPL
350593	2001 QJ_{200}	—	August 22, 2001	Palomar	NEAT	H	790 m	MPC · JPL
350594	2001 QU_{261}	—	August 25, 2001	Socorro	LINEAR	·	760 m	MPC · JPL
350595	2001 QH_{272}	—	August 19, 2001	Socorro	LINEAR	·	890 m	MPC · JPL
350596	2001 QZ_{291}	—	August 16, 2001	Socorro	LINEAR	(883)	700 m	MPC · JPL
350597	2001 QB_{295}	—	August 24, 2001	Socorro	LINEAR	·	1.5 km	MPC · JPL
350598	2001 RG_{24}	—	September 7, 2001	Socorro	LINEAR	·	780 m	MPC · JPL
350599	2001 RY_{42}	—	September 6, 2001	Palomar	NEAT	(2076)	1.2 km	MPC · JPL
350600	2001 RG_{57}	—	September 12, 2001	Socorro	LINEAR	·	650 m	MPC · JPL

== 350601–350700 ==
back to top

Designation			Discovery			Properties		Ref
Permanent	Provisional	Named after	Date	Site	Discoverer(s)	Category	Diam.	Ref
350601	2001 RG_{104}	—	September 12, 2001	Socorro	LINEAR	·	1.1 km	MPC · JPL
350602	2001 RT_{104}	—	September 12, 2001	Socorro	LINEAR	·	770 m	MPC · JPL
350603	2001 RK_{105}	—	September 12, 2001	Socorro	LINEAR	·	2.5 km	MPC · JPL
350604	2001 RW_{130}	—	September 12, 2001	Socorro	LINEAR	·	790 m	MPC · JPL
350605	2001 RB_{139}	—	September 12, 2001	Socorro	LINEAR	·	850 m	MPC · JPL
350606	2001 SK_{11}	—	September 16, 2001	Socorro	LINEAR	·	820 m	MPC · JPL
350607	2001 SA_{17}	—	September 16, 2001	Socorro	LINEAR	·	990 m	MPC · JPL
350608	2001 SX_{27}	—	September 16, 2001	Socorro	LINEAR	·	1.8 km	MPC · JPL
350609	2001 SJ_{41}	—	September 16, 2001	Socorro	LINEAR	(2076)	850 m	MPC · JPL
350610	2001 SN_{67}	—	September 17, 2001	Socorro	LINEAR	MAS	930 m	MPC · JPL
350611	2001 SG_{76}	—	September 16, 2001	Socorro	LINEAR	·	700 m	MPC · JPL
350612	2001 SW_{79}	—	September 20, 2001	Socorro	LINEAR	·	950 m	MPC · JPL
350613	2001 SZ_{96}	—	September 20, 2001	Socorro	LINEAR	·	840 m	MPC · JPL
350614	2001 SS_{113}	—	September 20, 2001	Desert Eagle	W. K. Y. Yeung	·	840 m	MPC · JPL
350615	2001 SS_{134}	—	September 16, 2001	Socorro	LINEAR	·	590 m	MPC · JPL
350616	2001 SF_{144}	—	September 16, 2001	Socorro	LINEAR	H	660 m	MPC · JPL
350617	2001 SS_{171}	—	September 16, 2001	Socorro	LINEAR	·	710 m	MPC · JPL
350618	2001 SK_{187}	—	September 19, 2001	Socorro	LINEAR	·	770 m	MPC · JPL
350619	2001 SN_{198}	—	September 19, 2001	Socorro	LINEAR	·	960 m	MPC · JPL
350620	2001 SS_{207}	—	September 19, 2001	Socorro	LINEAR	·	2.2 km	MPC · JPL
350621	2001 SH_{211}	—	September 19, 2001	Socorro	LINEAR	·	850 m	MPC · JPL
350622	2001 SN_{212}	—	September 19, 2001	Socorro	LINEAR	·	1.8 km	MPC · JPL
350623	2001 SJ_{217}	—	September 19, 2001	Socorro	LINEAR	·	780 m	MPC · JPL
350624	2001 SY_{221}	—	September 19, 2001	Socorro	LINEAR	(2076)	960 m	MPC · JPL
350625	2001 SX_{222}	—	September 19, 2001	Socorro	LINEAR	·	860 m	MPC · JPL
350626	2001 ST_{243}	—	September 19, 2001	Socorro	LINEAR	EOS	2.1 km	MPC · JPL
350627	2001 SF_{256}	—	September 19, 2001	Socorro	LINEAR	·	3.5 km	MPC · JPL
350628	2001 SR_{262}	—	September 24, 2001	Socorro	LINEAR	H	710 m	MPC · JPL
350629	2001 SK_{317}	—	September 19, 2001	Socorro	LINEAR	·	760 m	MPC · JPL
350630	2001 SG_{319}	—	September 21, 2001	Socorro	LINEAR	(2076)	890 m	MPC · JPL
350631	2001 TP	—	October 7, 2001	Palomar	NEAT	H	660 m	MPC · JPL
350632	2001 TU_{4}	—	October 8, 2001	Palomar	NEAT	·	730 m	MPC · JPL
350633	2001 TU_{16}	—	October 13, 2001	Socorro	LINEAR	H	590 m	MPC · JPL
350634	2001 TZ_{59}	—	October 13, 2001	Socorro	LINEAR	·	2.0 km	MPC · JPL
350635	2001 TB_{60}	—	October 13, 2001	Socorro	LINEAR	·	860 m	MPC · JPL
350636	2001 TJ_{61}	—	October 13, 2001	Socorro	LINEAR	·	870 m	MPC · JPL
350637	2001 TC_{72}	—	October 13, 2001	Socorro	LINEAR	·	2.5 km	MPC · JPL
350638	2001 TK_{85}	—	October 14, 2001	Socorro	LINEAR	NYS	990 m	MPC · JPL
350639	2001 TM_{101}	—	October 15, 2001	Socorro	LINEAR	·	910 m	MPC · JPL
350640	2001 TW_{101}	—	October 15, 2001	Socorro	LINEAR	·	900 m	MPC · JPL
350641	2001 TX_{101}	—	October 15, 2001	Socorro	LINEAR	·	820 m	MPC · JPL
350642	2001 TS_{111}	—	October 14, 2001	Socorro	LINEAR	·	1.6 km	MPC · JPL
350643	2001 TX_{123}	—	October 12, 2001	Haleakala	NEAT	·	1.1 km	MPC · JPL
350644	2001 TV_{128}	—	October 14, 2001	Kitt Peak	Spacewatch	·	2.1 km	MPC · JPL
350645	2001 TX_{135}	—	October 13, 2001	Palomar	NEAT	V	810 m	MPC · JPL
350646	2001 TC_{136}	—	October 13, 2001	Palomar	NEAT	·	1.2 km	MPC · JPL
350647	2001 TO_{141}	—	October 10, 2001	Palomar	NEAT	·	4.0 km	MPC · JPL
350648	2001 TP_{146}	—	October 10, 2001	Palomar	NEAT	·	1.3 km	MPC · JPL
350649	2001 TN_{201}	—	October 11, 2001	Socorro	LINEAR	·	980 m	MPC · JPL
350650	2001 TS_{208}	—	October 11, 2001	Palomar	NEAT	·	2.2 km	MPC · JPL
350651	2001 TN_{213}	—	October 13, 2001	Socorro	LINEAR	·	1.2 km	MPC · JPL
350652	2001 TJ_{214}	—	October 13, 2001	Palomar	NEAT	·	780 m	MPC · JPL
350653	2001 TQ_{215}	—	October 13, 2001	Palomar	NEAT	·	1.2 km	MPC · JPL
350654	2001 TH_{222}	—	October 14, 2001	Socorro	LINEAR	EOS	2.2 km	MPC · JPL
350655	2001 TH_{235}	—	October 15, 2001	Palomar	NEAT	EOS	2.1 km	MPC · JPL
350656	2001 TX_{237}	—	October 10, 2001	Palomar	NEAT	·	860 m	MPC · JPL
350657	2001 TS_{241}	—	October 13, 2001	Kitt Peak	Spacewatch	·	1.6 km	MPC · JPL
350658	2001 TY_{241}	—	October 14, 2001	Anderson Mesa	LONEOS	·	950 m	MPC · JPL
350659	2001 TF_{255}	—	October 14, 2001	Apache Point	SDSS	·	2.1 km	MPC · JPL
350660	2001 TG_{262}	—	December 4, 2005	Kitt Peak	Spacewatch	·	880 m	MPC · JPL
350661	2001 UM_{7}	—	October 17, 2001	Socorro	LINEAR	·	720 m	MPC · JPL
350662	2001 UF_{11}	—	October 23, 2001	Desert Eagle	W. K. Y. Yeung	·	1.5 km	MPC · JPL
350663	2001 UF_{22}	—	October 17, 2001	Socorro	LINEAR	·	1.0 km	MPC · JPL
350664	2001 US_{29}	—	October 16, 2001	Socorro	LINEAR	·	1.2 km	MPC · JPL
350665	2001 UX_{40}	—	October 17, 2001	Socorro	LINEAR	·	2.1 km	MPC · JPL
350666	2001 UO_{43}	—	October 17, 2001	Socorro	LINEAR	NYS	1 km	MPC · JPL
350667	2001 UX_{59}	—	October 17, 2001	Socorro	LINEAR	NYS	1.2 km	MPC · JPL
350668	2001 UG_{61}	—	October 17, 2001	Socorro	LINEAR	·	700 m	MPC · JPL
350669	2001 UA_{71}	—	October 17, 2001	Kitt Peak	Spacewatch	·	1.1 km	MPC · JPL
350670	2001 UV_{76}	—	October 17, 2001	Socorro	LINEAR	·	870 m	MPC · JPL
350671	2001 UN_{78}	—	October 20, 2001	Socorro	LINEAR	·	1.1 km	MPC · JPL
350672	2001 UL_{91}	—	October 18, 2001	Palomar	NEAT	NAE	2.7 km	MPC · JPL
350673	2001 UR_{91}	—	October 18, 2001	Palomar	NEAT	·	1.7 km	MPC · JPL
350674	2001 UB_{100}	—	October 17, 2001	Socorro	LINEAR	·	2.9 km	MPC · JPL
350675	2001 UX_{128}	—	October 20, 2001	Socorro	LINEAR	·	700 m	MPC · JPL
350676	2001 UL_{136}	—	October 22, 2001	Socorro	LINEAR	·	3.0 km	MPC · JPL
350677	2001 UM_{149}	—	October 23, 2001	Socorro	LINEAR	NYS	1.1 km	MPC · JPL
350678	2001 UG_{151}	—	October 23, 2001	Socorro	LINEAR	NYS	1.1 km	MPC · JPL
350679	2001 UO_{158}	—	October 23, 2001	Socorro	LINEAR	·	990 m	MPC · JPL
350680	2001 US_{160}	—	October 23, 2001	Socorro	LINEAR	·	2.6 km	MPC · JPL
350681	2001 UO_{172}	—	October 18, 2001	Palomar	NEAT	·	2.0 km	MPC · JPL
350682	2001 UQ_{176}	—	October 25, 2001	Kitt Peak	Spacewatch	KOR	1.5 km	MPC · JPL
350683	2001 UO_{183}	—	October 16, 2001	Palomar	NEAT	·	730 m	MPC · JPL
350684	2001 UZ_{192}	—	October 18, 2001	Socorro	LINEAR	EOS	2.5 km	MPC · JPL
350685	2001 UU_{229}	—	October 2, 2006	Catalina	CSS	·	3.4 km	MPC · JPL
350686	2001 VV_{4}	—	November 11, 2001	Socorro	LINEAR	H	700 m	MPC · JPL
350687	2001 VB_{12}	—	November 10, 2001	Socorro	LINEAR	PHO	1.4 km	MPC · JPL
350688	2001 VD_{25}	—	November 9, 2001	Socorro	LINEAR	NYS	1.1 km	MPC · JPL
350689	2001 VB_{27}	—	November 9, 2001	Socorro	LINEAR	·	920 m	MPC · JPL
350690	2001 VP_{56}	—	November 10, 2001	Socorro	LINEAR	(2076)	930 m	MPC · JPL
350691	2001 VN_{63}	—	November 10, 2001	Socorro	LINEAR	·	860 m	MPC · JPL
350692	2001 VM_{86}	—	November 12, 2001	Socorro	LINEAR	·	2.8 km	MPC · JPL
350693	2001 VB_{109}	—	November 12, 2001	Socorro	LINEAR	·	1.3 km	MPC · JPL
350694	2001 VR_{111}	—	November 12, 2001	Socorro	LINEAR	NYS	960 m	MPC · JPL
350695	2001 VP_{126}	—	November 15, 2001	Kitt Peak	Spacewatch	·	1.0 km	MPC · JPL
350696	2001 WX_{8}	—	November 17, 2001	Socorro	LINEAR	ERI	1.6 km	MPC · JPL
350697	2001 WY_{10}	—	November 17, 2001	Socorro	LINEAR	·	1.0 km	MPC · JPL
350698	2001 WL_{14}	—	November 21, 2001	Socorro	LINEAR	PHO	1.8 km	MPC · JPL
350699	2001 WK_{26}	—	November 17, 2001	Socorro	LINEAR	·	2.2 km	MPC · JPL
350700	2001 WM_{36}	—	November 17, 2001	Socorro	LINEAR	·	1.0 km	MPC · JPL

== 350701–350800 ==
back to top

Designation			Discovery			Properties		Ref
Permanent	Provisional	Named after	Date	Site	Discoverer(s)	Category	Diam.	Ref
350701	2001 WU_{36}	—	November 17, 2001	Socorro	LINEAR	·	3.3 km	MPC · JPL
350702	2001 WV_{44}	—	November 18, 2001	Socorro	LINEAR	·	2.5 km	MPC · JPL
350703	2001 WS_{64}	—	November 20, 2001	Socorro	LINEAR	·	900 m	MPC · JPL
350704	2001 WW_{67}	—	November 20, 2001	Socorro	LINEAR	·	760 m	MPC · JPL
350705	2001 WE_{69}	—	November 20, 2001	Socorro	LINEAR	·	700 m	MPC · JPL
350706	2001 WZ_{75}	—	November 20, 2001	Socorro	LINEAR	·	1.0 km	MPC · JPL
350707	2001 WF_{83}	—	November 20, 2001	Socorro	LINEAR	NYS	1 km	MPC · JPL
350708	2001 XB_{14}	—	December 9, 2001	Socorro	LINEAR	·	3.3 km	MPC · JPL
350709	2001 XR_{57}	—	December 10, 2001	Socorro	LINEAR	·	1.3 km	MPC · JPL
350710	2001 XD_{70}	—	December 11, 2001	Socorro	LINEAR	·	2.7 km	MPC · JPL
350711	2001 XW_{74}	—	December 11, 2001	Socorro	LINEAR	·	1.3 km	MPC · JPL
350712	2001 XN_{80}	—	December 11, 2001	Socorro	LINEAR	T_{j} (2.99)	5.1 km	MPC · JPL
350713	2001 XP_{88}	—	December 14, 2001	Socorro	LINEAR	AMO	250 m	MPC · JPL
350714	2001 XN_{93}	—	December 10, 2001	Socorro	LINEAR	·	1.1 km	MPC · JPL
350715	2001 XW_{95}	—	December 10, 2001	Socorro	LINEAR	·	1.4 km	MPC · JPL
350716	2001 XO_{105}	—	December 15, 2001	Socorro	LINEAR	H	590 m	MPC · JPL
350717	2001 XU_{110}	—	December 11, 2001	Socorro	LINEAR	·	800 m	MPC · JPL
350718	2001 XL_{117}	—	December 13, 2001	Socorro	LINEAR	·	3.3 km	MPC · JPL
350719	2001 XA_{126}	—	November 17, 2001	Socorro	LINEAR	·	970 m	MPC · JPL
350720	2001 XR_{147}	—	December 14, 2001	Socorro	LINEAR	NYS	920 m	MPC · JPL
350721	2001 XY_{148}	—	December 14, 2001	Socorro	LINEAR	·	3.6 km	MPC · JPL
350722	2001 XD_{150}	—	December 14, 2001	Socorro	LINEAR	·	1.1 km	MPC · JPL
350723	2001 XB_{155}	—	December 14, 2001	Socorro	LINEAR	ERI	2.2 km	MPC · JPL
350724	2001 XG_{160}	—	December 14, 2001	Socorro	LINEAR	NYS	1.1 km	MPC · JPL
350725	2001 XM_{162}	—	December 14, 2001	Socorro	LINEAR	·	1.3 km	MPC · JPL
350726	2001 XY_{162}	—	December 14, 2001	Socorro	LINEAR	EOS	2.4 km	MPC · JPL
350727	2001 XP_{176}	—	December 14, 2001	Socorro	LINEAR	MAS	850 m	MPC · JPL
350728	2001 XM_{186}	—	December 14, 2001	Socorro	LINEAR	·	1.5 km	MPC · JPL
350729	2001 XE_{193}	—	December 14, 2001	Socorro	LINEAR	H	750 m	MPC · JPL
350730	2001 XC_{208}	—	December 11, 2001	Socorro	LINEAR	·	3.1 km	MPC · JPL
350731	2001 XT_{221}	—	December 15, 2001	Socorro	LINEAR	·	2.2 km	MPC · JPL
350732	2001 XF_{223}	—	December 15, 2001	Socorro	LINEAR	EMA	3.5 km	MPC · JPL
350733	2001 XK_{228}	—	December 15, 2001	Socorro	LINEAR	NYS	1.1 km	MPC · JPL
350734	2001 XZ_{252}	—	December 14, 2001	Socorro	LINEAR	·	3.7 km	MPC · JPL
350735	2001 XV_{256}	—	December 7, 2001	Socorro	LINEAR	·	2.6 km	MPC · JPL
350736	2001 YO_{17}	—	December 17, 2001	Socorro	LINEAR	T_{j} (2.96)	2.6 km	MPC · JPL
350737	2001 YG_{22}	—	December 18, 2001	Socorro	LINEAR	·	830 m	MPC · JPL
350738	2001 YK_{27}	—	December 18, 2001	Socorro	LINEAR	·	940 m	MPC · JPL
350739	2001 YX_{34}	—	December 18, 2001	Socorro	LINEAR	·	1.0 km	MPC · JPL
350740	2001 YT_{35}	—	December 18, 2001	Socorro	LINEAR	·	3.5 km	MPC · JPL
350741	2001 YG_{37}	—	December 18, 2001	Socorro	LINEAR	EOS	2.8 km	MPC · JPL
350742	2001 YA_{55}	—	December 18, 2001	Socorro	LINEAR	·	940 m	MPC · JPL
350743	2001 YY_{79}	—	December 18, 2001	Socorro	LINEAR	MAS	800 m	MPC · JPL
350744	2001 YC_{89}	—	December 18, 2001	Socorro	LINEAR	·	1.2 km	MPC · JPL
350745	2001 YC_{124}	—	December 17, 2001	Socorro	LINEAR	·	1.1 km	MPC · JPL
350746	2001 YP_{126}	—	December 17, 2001	Socorro	LINEAR	ERI	1.6 km	MPC · JPL
350747	2001 YY_{128}	—	December 17, 2001	Socorro	LINEAR	·	1.5 km	MPC · JPL
350748	2001 YN_{134}	—	December 17, 2001	Socorro	LINEAR	·	4.1 km	MPC · JPL
350749	2001 YO_{151}	—	December 19, 2001	Palomar	NEAT	TIR	3.4 km	MPC · JPL
350750	2001 YC_{160}	—	December 18, 2001	Apache Point	SDSS	H	740 m	MPC · JPL
350751	2002 AW	—	January 5, 2002	Kitt Peak	Spacewatch	APO · PHA · moon	240 m	MPC · JPL
350752	2002 AR_{17}	—	January 9, 2002	Socorro	LINEAR	H	700 m	MPC · JPL
350753	2002 AD_{18}	—	January 5, 2002	Palomar	NEAT	H	740 m	MPC · JPL
350754	2002 AR_{28}	—	January 7, 2002	Anderson Mesa	LONEOS	·	3.4 km	MPC · JPL
350755	2002 AW_{33}	—	January 12, 2002	Kitt Peak	Spacewatch	THM	2.6 km	MPC · JPL
350756	2002 AF_{43}	—	January 9, 2002	Socorro	LINEAR	·	1.0 km	MPC · JPL
350757	2002 AT_{45}	—	January 9, 2002	Socorro	LINEAR	THM	2.6 km	MPC · JPL
350758	2002 AK_{51}	—	January 9, 2002	Socorro	LINEAR	·	1.4 km	MPC · JPL
350759	2002 AU_{66}	—	January 13, 2002	Socorro	LINEAR	·	1.4 km	MPC · JPL
350760	2002 AE_{73}	—	January 8, 2002	Socorro	LINEAR	NYS	1.2 km	MPC · JPL
350761	2002 AM_{75}	—	January 8, 2002	Socorro	LINEAR	·	1.4 km	MPC · JPL
350762	2002 AR_{76}	—	January 8, 2002	Socorro	LINEAR	·	2.6 km	MPC · JPL
350763	2002 AW_{79}	—	January 8, 2002	Socorro	LINEAR	·	2.4 km	MPC · JPL
350764	2002 AJ_{109}	—	January 9, 2002	Socorro	LINEAR	·	4.0 km	MPC · JPL
350765	2002 AZ_{115}	—	January 9, 2002	Socorro	LINEAR	·	1.2 km	MPC · JPL
350766	2002 AM_{146}	—	January 13, 2002	Socorro	LINEAR	·	1.1 km	MPC · JPL
350767	2002 AJ_{153}	—	January 14, 2002	Socorro	LINEAR	T_{j} (2.92)	4.5 km	MPC · JPL
350768	2002 AW_{171}	—	January 14, 2002	Socorro	LINEAR	·	3.2 km	MPC · JPL
350769	2002 AU_{183}	—	January 6, 2002	Palomar	NEAT	MAS	780 m	MPC · JPL
350770	2002 AJ_{191}	—	January 12, 2002	Campo Imperatore	CINEOS	·	2.0 km	MPC · JPL
350771	2002 BL_{14}	—	January 19, 2002	Socorro	LINEAR	·	1.7 km	MPC · JPL
350772	2002 BO_{25}	—	January 25, 2002	Palomar	NEAT	·	2.8 km	MPC · JPL
350773	2002 BE_{27}	—	January 18, 2002	Anderson Mesa	LONEOS	EUP	6.9 km	MPC · JPL
350774	2002 BO_{32}	—	January 26, 2002	Palomar	NEAT	·	4.9 km	MPC · JPL
350775	2002 CM_{5}	—	February 4, 2002	Palomar	NEAT	ERI	1.8 km	MPC · JPL
350776	2002 CU_{6}	—	February 1, 2002	Socorro	LINEAR	H	690 m	MPC · JPL
350777	2002 CA_{11}	—	February 6, 2002	Socorro	LINEAR	·	1.3 km	MPC · JPL
350778	2002 CM_{11}	—	February 2, 2002	Eskridge	G. Hug	·	1.2 km	MPC · JPL
350779	2002 CO_{21}	—	February 5, 2002	Palomar	NEAT	MAS	810 m	MPC · JPL
350780	2002 CS_{25}	—	February 10, 2002	Socorro	LINEAR	H	710 m	MPC · JPL
350781	2002 CW_{34}	—	February 6, 2002	Socorro	LINEAR	·	3.7 km	MPC · JPL
350782	2002 CG_{36}	—	February 7, 2002	Socorro	LINEAR	·	1.2 km	MPC · JPL
350783	2002 CX_{47}	—	February 3, 2002	Haleakala	NEAT	·	1.8 km	MPC · JPL
350784	2002 CA_{68}	—	February 7, 2002	Socorro	LINEAR	·	1.2 km	MPC · JPL
350785	2002 CF_{71}	—	February 7, 2002	Socorro	LINEAR	·	1.3 km	MPC · JPL
350786	2002 CE_{82}	—	February 7, 2002	Socorro	LINEAR	NYS	1.5 km	MPC · JPL
350787	2002 CU_{87}	—	February 7, 2002	Socorro	LINEAR	·	6.3 km	MPC · JPL
350788	2002 CX_{87}	—	February 7, 2002	Socorro	LINEAR	NYS	1.3 km	MPC · JPL
350789	2002 CY_{115}	—	February 13, 2002	Socorro	LINEAR	EUP	4.7 km	MPC · JPL
350790	2002 CL_{122}	—	February 7, 2002	Socorro	LINEAR	·	1.5 km	MPC · JPL
350791	2002 CR_{130}	—	February 7, 2002	Socorro	LINEAR	NYS	1.5 km	MPC · JPL
350792	2002 CE_{134}	—	February 7, 2002	Socorro	LINEAR	V	920 m	MPC · JPL
350793	2002 CJ_{152}	—	February 10, 2002	Socorro	LINEAR	·	3.4 km	MPC · JPL
350794	2002 CM_{159}	—	February 7, 2002	Socorro	LINEAR	L4	10 km	MPC · JPL
350795	2002 CW_{168}	—	February 8, 2002	Socorro	LINEAR	·	1.5 km	MPC · JPL
350796	2002 CX_{175}	—	February 10, 2002	Socorro	LINEAR	·	3.4 km	MPC · JPL
350797	2002 CK_{177}	—	February 10, 2002	Socorro	LINEAR	·	2.8 km	MPC · JPL
350798	2002 CO_{184}	—	February 10, 2002	Socorro	LINEAR	·	1.2 km	MPC · JPL
350799	2002 CX_{187}	—	February 10, 2002	Socorro	LINEAR	NYS	1.1 km	MPC · JPL
350800	2002 CJ_{201}	—	February 10, 2002	Socorro	LINEAR	·	2.8 km	MPC · JPL

== 350801–350900 ==
back to top

Designation			Discovery			Properties		Ref
Permanent	Provisional	Named after	Date	Site	Discoverer(s)	Category	Diam.	Ref
350801	2002 CU_{202}	—	January 14, 2002	Kitt Peak	Spacewatch	L4	10 km	MPC · JPL
350802	2002 CL_{208}	—	February 10, 2002	Socorro	LINEAR	·	1.5 km	MPC · JPL
350803	2002 CD_{209}	—	February 10, 2002	Socorro	LINEAR	·	1.3 km	MPC · JPL
350804	2002 CO_{211}	—	February 10, 2002	Socorro	LINEAR	VER	2.7 km	MPC · JPL
350805	2002 CT_{214}	—	February 10, 2002	Socorro	LINEAR	·	3.8 km	MPC · JPL
350806	2002 CJ_{216}	—	February 10, 2002	Socorro	LINEAR	NYS	1.3 km	MPC · JPL
350807	2002 CD_{230}	—	February 11, 2002	Kitt Peak	Spacewatch	THM	2.2 km	MPC · JPL
350808	2002 CF_{249}	—	February 14, 2002	Kitt Peak	Spacewatch	·	3.7 km	MPC · JPL
350809	2002 CP_{257}	—	February 6, 2002	Kitt Peak	M. W. Buie	·	3.4 km	MPC · JPL
350810	2002 CM_{260}	—	January 7, 2002	Kitt Peak	Spacewatch	·	1 km	MPC · JPL
350811	2002 CV_{265}	—	February 7, 2002	Kitt Peak	Spacewatch	·	2.0 km	MPC · JPL
350812	2002 CV_{275}	—	February 9, 2002	Palomar	NEAT	·	4.3 km	MPC · JPL
350813	2002 CW_{275}	—	February 9, 2002	Kitt Peak	Spacewatch	·	1.8 km	MPC · JPL
350814	2002 CB_{276}	—	February 9, 2002	Palomar	NEAT	·	4.2 km	MPC · JPL
350815	2002 CN_{297}	—	February 11, 2002	Socorro	LINEAR	MAS	680 m	MPC · JPL
350816	2002 CP_{301}	—	February 11, 2002	Socorro	LINEAR	NYS	1.2 km	MPC · JPL
350817	2002 CC_{310}	—	February 6, 2002	Palomar	NEAT	THB	2.4 km	MPC · JPL
350818	2002 CP_{316}	—	February 6, 2002	Palomar	NEAT	·	1.5 km	MPC · JPL
350819	2002 DO	—	February 16, 2002	Bohyunsan	Jeon, Y.-B., Lee, B.-C.	VER	3.2 km	MPC · JPL
350820	2002 DS_{13}	—	February 16, 2002	Palomar	NEAT	·	1.3 km	MPC · JPL
350821	2002 DT_{15}	—	February 11, 2002	Socorro	LINEAR	·	4.0 km	MPC · JPL
350822	2002 EM_{2}	—	March 9, 2002	Palomar	NEAT	EUP	6.1 km	MPC · JPL
350823	2002 EA_{38}	—	March 10, 2002	Kitt Peak	Spacewatch	NYS	1.1 km	MPC · JPL
350824	2002 EN_{38}	—	March 12, 2002	Kitt Peak	Spacewatch	·	1.7 km	MPC · JPL
350825	2002 ER_{38}	—	January 14, 2002	Kitt Peak	Spacewatch	L4 · ERY	8.9 km	MPC · JPL
350826	2002 ET_{51}	—	March 9, 2002	Socorro	LINEAR	·	4.2 km	MPC · JPL
350827	2002 EG_{61}	—	March 13, 2002	Socorro	LINEAR	·	3.5 km	MPC · JPL
350828	2002 ED_{97}	—	March 11, 2002	Socorro	LINEAR	·	2.6 km	MPC · JPL
350829	2002 EA_{99}	—	March 15, 2002	Socorro	LINEAR	·	1.2 km	MPC · JPL
350830	2002 ED_{103}	—	March 9, 2002	Palomar	NEAT	NYS	950 m	MPC · JPL
350831	2002 EG_{103}	—	March 9, 2002	Palomar	NEAT	·	3.7 km	MPC · JPL
350832	2002 ED_{107}	—	March 9, 2002	Anderson Mesa	LONEOS	EOS	2.7 km	MPC · JPL
350833	2002 EB_{109}	—	March 9, 2002	Kitt Peak	Spacewatch	·	1.2 km	MPC · JPL
350834	2002 ER_{120}	—	March 11, 2002	Kitt Peak	Spacewatch	·	1.6 km	MPC · JPL
350835	2002 ED_{122}	—	March 12, 2002	Palomar	NEAT	·	1.0 km	MPC · JPL
350836	2002 EO_{157}	—	March 13, 2002	Palomar	NEAT	L4	8.7 km	MPC · JPL
350837	2002 EJ_{158}	—	March 5, 2002	Apache Point	SDSS	·	1.1 km	MPC · JPL
350838 Gorelysheva	2002 EH_{163}	Gorelysheva	March 14, 2002	Palomar	NEAT	·	4.3 km	MPC · JPL
350839	2002 FH_{7}	—	March 22, 2002	Palomar	NEAT	·	1.4 km	MPC · JPL
350840	2002 FF_{17}	—	March 17, 2002	Haleakala	NEAT	·	4.1 km	MPC · JPL
350841	2002 FB_{26}	—	March 19, 2002	Palomar	NEAT	·	4.2 km	MPC · JPL
350842	2002 FS_{37}	—	March 31, 2002	Palomar	NEAT	·	1.6 km	MPC · JPL
350843	2002 GO_{8}	—	April 4, 2002	Palomar	NEAT	T_{j} (2.96)	7.4 km	MPC · JPL
350844	2002 GU_{45}	—	April 4, 2002	Palomar	NEAT	·	1.5 km	MPC · JPL
350845	2002 GE_{53}	—	April 5, 2002	Palomar	NEAT	·	4.2 km	MPC · JPL
350846	2002 GU_{56}	—	April 6, 2002	Kvistaberg	Uppsala-DLR Asteroid Survey	·	5.5 km	MPC · JPL
350847	2002 GP_{62}	—	April 8, 2002	Palomar	NEAT	NYS	1.4 km	MPC · JPL
350848	2002 GZ_{66}	—	April 8, 2002	Palomar	NEAT	V	930 m	MPC · JPL
350849	2002 GB_{76}	—	April 9, 2002	Socorro	LINEAR	·	1.4 km	MPC · JPL
350850	2002 GF_{103}	—	April 10, 2002	Socorro	LINEAR	MAS	820 m	MPC · JPL
350851	2002 GY_{106}	—	April 11, 2002	Anderson Mesa	LONEOS	·	4.0 km	MPC · JPL
350852	2002 GF_{179}	—	April 2, 2002	Palomar	NEAT	·	1.6 km	MPC · JPL
350853	2002 JG_{140}	—	May 10, 2002	Anderson Mesa	LONEOS	·	1.8 km	MPC · JPL
350854	2002 JH_{140}	—	May 10, 2002	Anderson Mesa	LONEOS	·	1.4 km	MPC · JPL
350855	2002 LZ_{43}	—	June 10, 2002	Socorro	LINEAR	·	3.8 km	MPC · JPL
350856	2002 LC_{63}	—	June 13, 2002	Palomar	NEAT	·	2.5 km	MPC · JPL
350857	2002 MP_{7}	—	March 16, 2010	WISE	WISE	·	4.0 km	MPC · JPL
350858	2002 NK_{5}	—	July 10, 2002	Campo Imperatore	CINEOS	EUN	1.2 km	MPC · JPL
350859	2002 NR_{17}	—	July 5, 2002	Socorro	LINEAR	JUN	1.1 km	MPC · JPL
350860	2002 NM_{36}	—	July 9, 2002	Socorro	LINEAR	EUN	1.5 km	MPC · JPL
350861	2002 NY_{48}	—	June 20, 2002	Palomar	NEAT	·	1.9 km	MPC · JPL
350862	2002 NS_{58}	—	July 12, 2002	Palomar	NEAT	·	2.3 km	MPC · JPL
350863	2002 NY_{65}	—	July 9, 2002	Palomar	NEAT	·	1.8 km	MPC · JPL
350864	2002 NS_{79}	—	December 14, 2003	Kitt Peak	Spacewatch	·	1.8 km	MPC · JPL
350865	2002 NC_{80}	—	October 17, 2011	Piszkéstető	K. Sárneczky, Szing, A.	·	1.7 km	MPC · JPL
350866	2002 NO_{80}	—	January 16, 2009	Kitt Peak	Spacewatch	·	2.0 km	MPC · JPL
350867	2002 OU_{6}	—	July 20, 2002	Palomar	NEAT	(194)	3.7 km	MPC · JPL
350868	2002 OZ_{19}	—	July 22, 2002	Palomar	NEAT	·	1.4 km	MPC · JPL
350869	2002 OY_{36}	—	April 2, 2010	WISE	WISE	·	1.2 km	MPC · JPL
350870	2002 OF_{37}	—	December 21, 2008	Kitt Peak	Spacewatch	·	1.8 km	MPC · JPL
350871	2002 PR_{9}	—	August 5, 2002	Palomar	NEAT	·	1.5 km	MPC · JPL
350872	2002 PG_{43}	—	August 10, 2002	Socorro	LINEAR	·	620 m	MPC · JPL
350873	2002 PB_{87}	—	August 4, 2002	Palomar	NEAT	(23255)	2.7 km	MPC · JPL
350874	2002 PF_{105}	—	August 12, 2002	Socorro	LINEAR	·	2.0 km	MPC · JPL
350875	2002 PL_{112}	—	August 8, 2002	Palomar	NEAT	EUN	1.4 km	MPC · JPL
350876	2002 PV_{184}	—	August 11, 2002	Palomar	NEAT	·	1.7 km	MPC · JPL
350877	2002 QH_{8}	—	August 19, 2002	Palomar	NEAT	·	2.3 km	MPC · JPL
350878	2002 QH_{17}	—	August 26, 2002	Palomar	NEAT	EUN	1.4 km	MPC · JPL
350879	2002 QS_{30}	—	August 29, 2002	Palomar	NEAT	DOR	2.4 km	MPC · JPL
350880	2002 QK_{56}	—	August 29, 2002	Palomar	NEAT	·	1.7 km	MPC · JPL
350881	2002 QC_{57}	—	August 17, 2002	Palomar	Lowe, A.	DOR	2.2 km	MPC · JPL
350882	2002 QS_{57}	—	August 29, 2002	Palomar	S. F. Hönig	·	1.9 km	MPC · JPL
350883	2002 QF_{93}	—	August 19, 2002	Palomar	NEAT	·	1.8 km	MPC · JPL
350884	2002 QW_{104}	—	August 26, 2002	Palomar	NEAT	·	2.1 km	MPC · JPL
350885	2002 QV_{105}	—	August 30, 2002	Palomar	Palomar	·	1.8 km	MPC · JPL
350886	2002 QZ_{118}	—	August 18, 2002	Palomar	NEAT	·	1.6 km	MPC · JPL
350887	2002 QN_{121}	—	August 16, 2002	Palomar	NEAT	·	1.8 km	MPC · JPL
350888	2002 QO_{124}	—	August 16, 2002	Palomar	NEAT	·	1.8 km	MPC · JPL
350889	2002 QF_{129}	—	August 18, 2002	Palomar	NEAT	EUN	1.4 km	MPC · JPL
350890	2002 QD_{141}	—	July 21, 2006	Mount Lemmon	Mount Lemmon Survey	·	2.3 km	MPC · JPL
350891	2002 QY_{142}	—	October 7, 2007	Kitt Peak	Spacewatch	·	1.9 km	MPC · JPL
350892	2002 QB_{145}	—	February 14, 2005	Kitt Peak	Spacewatch	·	1.1 km	MPC · JPL
350893	2002 QG_{150}	—	November 19, 2007	Catalina	CSS	·	2.7 km	MPC · JPL
350894	2002 QB_{151}	—	December 22, 2008	Kitt Peak	Spacewatch	·	1.9 km	MPC · JPL
350895	2002 QX_{152}	—	May 5, 2010	Mount Lemmon	Mount Lemmon Survey	·	2.0 km	MPC · JPL
350896	2002 QA_{154}	—	October 7, 2007	Mount Lemmon	Mount Lemmon Survey	·	1.5 km	MPC · JPL
350897	2002 RE	—	September 1, 2002	Palomar	NEAT	·	2.0 km	MPC · JPL
350898	2002 RX_{3}	—	July 18, 2002	Socorro	LINEAR	·	2.4 km	MPC · JPL
350899	2002 RC_{4}	—	August 4, 2002	Palomar	NEAT	·	1.7 km	MPC · JPL
350900	2002 RB_{7}	—	September 2, 2002	Kitt Peak	Spacewatch	·	2.1 km	MPC · JPL

== 350901–351000 ==
back to top

Designation			Discovery			Properties		Ref
Permanent	Provisional	Named after	Date	Site	Discoverer(s)	Category	Diam.	Ref
350901	2002 RH_{70}	—	September 4, 2002	Palomar	NEAT	·	2.6 km	MPC · JPL
350902	2002 RG_{86}	—	September 5, 2002	Socorro	LINEAR	·	2.2 km	MPC · JPL
350903	2002 RC_{92}	—	September 5, 2002	Socorro	LINEAR	·	1.6 km	MPC · JPL
350904	2002 RR_{93}	—	September 5, 2002	Anderson Mesa	LONEOS	·	2.1 km	MPC · JPL
350905	2002 RG_{97}	—	August 16, 2002	Socorro	LINEAR	·	2.3 km	MPC · JPL
350906	2002 RJ_{158}	—	September 11, 2002	Palomar	NEAT	·	1.8 km	MPC · JPL
350907	2002 RU_{199}	—	September 13, 2002	Palomar	NEAT	·	3.0 km	MPC · JPL
350908	2002 RJ_{211}	—	September 14, 2002	Haleakala	NEAT	·	1.5 km	MPC · JPL
350909	2002 RU_{236}	—	September 15, 2002	Palomar	NEAT	·	1.6 km	MPC · JPL
350910	2002 RX_{244}	—	September 14, 2002	Palomar	NEAT	·	1.8 km	MPC · JPL
350911	2002 RH_{256}	—	September 4, 2002	Palomar	NEAT	·	1.5 km	MPC · JPL
350912	2002 RG_{261}	—	September 11, 2002	Palomar	NEAT	·	2.1 km	MPC · JPL
350913	2002 RR_{267}	—	September 3, 2002	Palomar	NEAT	GEF	1.5 km	MPC · JPL
350914	2002 RC_{272}	—	September 4, 2002	Palomar	NEAT	·	2.2 km	MPC · JPL
350915	2002 RA_{281}	—	September 4, 2002	Anderson Mesa	LONEOS	EUN	1.9 km	MPC · JPL
350916	2002 RY_{291}	—	February 20, 2009	Mount Lemmon	Mount Lemmon Survey	·	2.1 km	MPC · JPL
350917	2002 RV_{292}	—	January 19, 2004	Kitt Peak	Spacewatch	·	2.1 km	MPC · JPL
350918	2002 RW_{293}	—	October 17, 2007	Catalina	CSS	·	2.8 km	MPC · JPL
350919	2002 SZ_{49}	—	September 5, 2002	Socorro	LINEAR	·	2.4 km	MPC · JPL
350920	2002 SV_{63}	—	September 16, 2002	Palomar	NEAT	·	2.1 km	MPC · JPL
350921	2002 TO_{21}	—	October 2, 2002	Socorro	LINEAR	GEF	1.3 km	MPC · JPL
350922	2002 TL_{24}	—	October 2, 2002	Socorro	LINEAR	·	2.4 km	MPC · JPL
350923	2002 TS_{28}	—	October 2, 2002	Socorro	LINEAR	·	2.8 km	MPC · JPL
350924	2002 TJ_{93}	—	October 3, 2002	Palomar	NEAT	EUN	1.5 km	MPC · JPL
350925	2002 TB_{95}	—	October 3, 2002	Palomar	NEAT	·	1.9 km	MPC · JPL
350926	2002 TF_{103}	—	October 4, 2002	Socorro	LINEAR	·	900 m	MPC · JPL
350927	2002 TL_{117}	—	October 3, 2002	Palomar	NEAT	·	2.6 km	MPC · JPL
350928	2002 TO_{163}	—	October 5, 2002	Palomar	NEAT	·	4.5 km	MPC · JPL
350929	2002 TG_{166}	—	August 22, 2002	Palomar	NEAT	·	2.4 km	MPC · JPL
350930	2002 TT_{202}	—	October 4, 2002	Socorro	LINEAR	·	1.7 km	MPC · JPL
350931	2002 TW_{218}	—	October 5, 2002	Socorro	LINEAR	DOR	3.1 km	MPC · JPL
350932	2002 TO_{263}	—	October 10, 2002	Socorro	LINEAR	·	720 m	MPC · JPL
350933	2002 TX_{272}	—	October 4, 2002	Socorro	LINEAR	·	2.9 km	MPC · JPL
350934	2002 TA_{294}	—	October 11, 2002	Socorro	LINEAR	·	2.3 km	MPC · JPL
350935	2002 TK_{320}	—	October 5, 2002	Apache Point	SDSS	·	1.9 km	MPC · JPL
350936	2002 TM_{365}	—	October 10, 2002	Apache Point	SDSS	AGN	1.3 km	MPC · JPL
350937	2002 TE_{369}	—	October 10, 2002	Apache Point	SDSS	·	2.1 km	MPC · JPL
350938	2002 TP_{378}	—	October 15, 2002	Palomar	NEAT	AGN	1.2 km	MPC · JPL
350939	2002 UB_{37}	—	October 31, 2002	Palomar	NEAT	(13314)	2.0 km	MPC · JPL
350940	2002 UT_{53}	—	October 29, 2002	Apache Point	SDSS	·	2.0 km	MPC · JPL
350941	2002 UA_{59}	—	October 29, 2002	Apache Point	SDSS	·	1.9 km	MPC · JPL
350942	2002 VK_{21}	—	November 5, 2002	Socorro	LINEAR	·	2.8 km	MPC · JPL
350943	2002 VC_{22}	—	November 5, 2002	Socorro	LINEAR	·	990 m	MPC · JPL
350944	2002 VZ_{24}	—	November 5, 2002	Socorro	LINEAR	·	2.4 km	MPC · JPL
350945	2002 VT_{54}	—	October 5, 2002	Socorro	LINEAR	GEF	1.6 km	MPC · JPL
350946	2002 VD_{61}	—	November 5, 2002	Socorro	LINEAR	·	650 m	MPC · JPL
350947	2002 VD_{88}	—	November 10, 2002	Socorro	LINEAR	·	960 m	MPC · JPL
350948	2002 VY_{100}	—	November 6, 2002	Socorro	LINEAR	·	2.5 km	MPC · JPL
350949	2002 VU_{133}	—	November 6, 2002	Anderson Mesa	LONEOS	·	720 m	MPC · JPL
350950	2002 VF_{143}	—	November 5, 2002	Palomar	NEAT	HOF	3.5 km	MPC · JPL
350951	2002 WN_{18}	—	November 1, 2002	Palomar	NEAT	·	790 m	MPC · JPL
350952	2002 WK_{29}	—	November 16, 2002	Palomar	NEAT	·	2.6 km	MPC · JPL
350953	2002 XD_{28}	—	December 5, 2002	Socorro	LINEAR	·	730 m	MPC · JPL
350954	2002 XK_{72}	—	December 11, 2002	Socorro	LINEAR	·	2.0 km	MPC · JPL
350955	2002 YA_{14}	—	December 31, 2002	Socorro	LINEAR	EOS ·	2.6 km	MPC · JPL
350956	2003 AD_{4}	—	January 3, 2003	Socorro	LINEAR	H	650 m	MPC · JPL
350957	2003 AG_{20}	—	January 5, 2003	Socorro	LINEAR	·	2.8 km	MPC · JPL
350958	2003 AM_{30}	—	January 4, 2003	Socorro	LINEAR	·	2.9 km	MPC · JPL
350959	2003 AR_{69}	—	January 8, 2003	Socorro	LINEAR	·	1.5 km	MPC · JPL
350960	2003 AU_{90}	—	January 5, 2003	Anderson Mesa	LONEOS	·	1.1 km	MPC · JPL
350961	2003 AO_{91}	—	January 5, 2003	Anderson Mesa	LONEOS	·	2.6 km	MPC · JPL
350962	2003 BT_{2}	—	January 26, 2003	Kitt Peak	Spacewatch	·	1.0 km	MPC · JPL
350963	2003 BK_{28}	—	January 26, 2003	Haleakala	NEAT	H	660 m	MPC · JPL
350964	2003 BT_{35}	—	January 28, 2003	Socorro	LINEAR	AMO	620 m	MPC · JPL
350965	2003 BO_{77}	—	January 30, 2003	Anderson Mesa	LONEOS	·	2.1 km	MPC · JPL
350966	2003 BS_{79}	—	January 31, 2003	Socorro	LINEAR	H	460 m	MPC · JPL
350967	2003 CZ	—	February 1, 2003	Socorro	LINEAR	·	1.5 km	MPC · JPL
350968	2003 CH_{14}	—	February 6, 2003	Wrightwood	J. W. Young	·	1.9 km	MPC · JPL
350969 Boiohaemum	2003 DK_{13}	Boiohaemum	February 27, 2003	Kleť	KLENOT	·	2.3 km	MPC · JPL
350970	2003 ED_{1}	—	March 5, 2003	Socorro	LINEAR	H	620 m	MPC · JPL
350971	2003 EA_{22}	—	March 6, 2003	Socorro	LINEAR	·	1.0 km	MPC · JPL
350972	2003 EL_{30}	—	March 6, 2003	Palomar	NEAT	·	800 m	MPC · JPL
350973	2003 EN_{31}	—	March 7, 2003	Socorro	LINEAR	·	970 m	MPC · JPL
350974	2003 EM_{38}	—	March 8, 2003	Anderson Mesa	LONEOS	·	4.1 km	MPC · JPL
350975	2003 EN_{50}	—	March 9, 2003	Anderson Mesa	LONEOS	·	2.3 km	MPC · JPL
350976	2003 FY_{19}	—	March 22, 2003	Palomar	NEAT	·	5.1 km	MPC · JPL
350977	2003 FS_{31}	—	March 23, 2003	Kitt Peak	Spacewatch	·	1.6 km	MPC · JPL
350978	2003 FZ_{36}	—	March 23, 2003	Kitt Peak	Spacewatch	L4	10 km	MPC · JPL
350979	2003 FC_{46}	—	March 24, 2003	Kitt Peak	Spacewatch	·	1.6 km	MPC · JPL
350980	2003 FW_{50}	—	March 25, 2003	Palomar	NEAT	·	830 m	MPC · JPL
350981	2003 FA_{71}	—	March 26, 2003	Kitt Peak	Spacewatch	·	3.0 km	MPC · JPL
350982	2003 FL_{71}	—	March 26, 2003	Kitt Peak	Spacewatch	·	760 m	MPC · JPL
350983	2003 FP_{78}	—	March 27, 2003	Kitt Peak	Spacewatch	·	1.7 km	MPC · JPL
350984	2003 FZ_{85}	—	March 28, 2003	Catalina	CSS	·	2.6 km	MPC · JPL
350985	2003 FN_{87}	—	March 28, 2003	Kitt Peak	Spacewatch	·	2.7 km	MPC · JPL
350986	2003 FA_{106}	—	March 26, 2003	Palomar	NEAT	·	970 m	MPC · JPL
350987	2003 FP_{131}	—	March 27, 2003	Kitt Peak	Spacewatch	EOS	2.6 km	MPC · JPL
350988	2003 GW	—	April 4, 2003	Haleakala	NEAT	APO +1km	1.5 km	MPC · JPL
350989	2003 GC_{12}	—	April 1, 2003	Palomar	NEAT	EOS	2.5 km	MPC · JPL
350990	2003 GE_{30}	—	April 7, 2003	Kitt Peak	Spacewatch	HYG	2.9 km	MPC · JPL
350991	2003 GQ_{34}	—	April 7, 2003	Kitt Peak	Spacewatch	·	2.9 km	MPC · JPL
350992	2003 GP_{41}	—	April 9, 2003	Kitt Peak	Spacewatch	·	2.8 km	MPC · JPL
350993	2003 GH_{42}	—	April 9, 2003	Reedy Creek	J. Broughton	·	2.9 km	MPC · JPL
350994	2003 GT_{42}	—	April 8, 2003	Socorro	LINEAR	·	1.9 km	MPC · JPL
350995	2003 GF_{45}	—	April 8, 2003	Palomar	NEAT	·	2.8 km	MPC · JPL
350996	2003 GH_{57}	—	April 11, 2003	Kitt Peak	Spacewatch	·	3.8 km	MPC · JPL
350997	2003 HB_{2}	—	April 22, 2003	Nashville	Clingan, R.	·	3.5 km	MPC · JPL
350998	2003 HR_{16}	—	April 28, 2003	Anderson Mesa	LONEOS	H	680 m	MPC · JPL
350999	2003 HK_{20}	—	April 24, 2003	Anderson Mesa	LONEOS	PHO	2.0 km	MPC · JPL
351000	2003 HR_{26}	—	April 27, 2003	Anderson Mesa	LONEOS	·	1.1 km	MPC · JPL

back to top

== See also ==
- Meanings of minor-planet names: 350001–351000
