= Meanings of minor-planet names: 350001–351000 =

As minor planet discoveries are confirmed, they are given a permanent number by the IAU's Minor Planet Center (MPC), and the discoverers can then submit names for them, following the IAU's naming conventions. The list below concerns those minor planets in the specified number-range that have received names, and explains the meanings of those names.

Official naming citations of newly named small Solar System bodies are approved and published in a bulletin by IAU's Working Group for Small Bodies Nomenclature (WGSBN). Before May 2021, citations were published in MPC's Minor Planet Circulars for many decades. Recent citations can also be found on the JPL Small-Body Database (SBDB). Until his death in 2016, German astronomer Lutz D. Schmadel compiled these citations into the Dictionary of Minor Planet Names (DMP) and regularly updated the collection.

Based on Paul Herget's The Names of the Minor Planets, Schmadel also researched the unclear origin of numerous asteroids, most of which had been named prior to World War II. This article incorporates text from this source, which is in the public domain: SBDB New namings may only be added to this list below after official publication as the preannouncement of names is condemned. The WGSBN publishes a comprehensive guideline for the naming rules of non-cometary small Solar System bodies.

== 350001–350100 ==
Named minor planet	Provisional	This minor planet was named for...	Ref · Catalog
350032 Josephhunt	2010 JH_{151}	Joseph Hunt (born 1956) is an American engineer and NASA mission manager and flight director who oversaw several missions such as NEOWISE, Spitzer, Cassini–Huygens, and TOPEX/Poseidon.	IAU · 350032

== 350101–350200 ==
back to top

Named minor planet	Provisional	This minor planet was named for...	Ref · Catalog
350173 Yoshidanaoki	2011 UL_{96}	Yoshida Naoki (b. 1973) is a Japanese video-game producer, director, and designer. He is known primarily for his work as director and producer of Final Fantasy XIV: A Realm Reborn.	IAU · 350173
350178 Eisleben	2011 UR_{139}	Eisleben, a German town situated in Saxony-Anhalt, where Martin Luther was born and died.	JPL · 350178
350185 Linnell	2011 UA_{260}	Stuart J. Linnell (born 1947), a noted local musician, poet, songwriter and lifelong friend of Canadian discoverer David D. Balam	JPL · 350185

== 350201–350300 ==
back to top

Named minor planet	Provisional	This minor planet was named for...	Ref · Catalog
There are no named minor planets in this number range

== 350301–350400 ==
back to top

Named minor planet	Provisional	This minor planet was named for...	Ref · Catalog
There are no named minor planets in this number range

== 350401–350500 ==
back to top

Named minor planet	Provisional	This minor planet was named for...	Ref · Catalog
There are no named minor planets in this number range

== 350501–350600 ==
back to top

Named minor planet	Provisional	This minor planet was named for...	Ref · Catalog
350509 Vepřoknedlozelo	2000 AH_{204}	Vepřo knedlo zelo is a famous traditional Czech meal, consisting of roast pork, dumplings and Sauerkraut (cabbage).	JPL · 350509

== 350601–350700 ==
back to top

Named minor planet	Provisional	This minor planet was named for...	Ref · Catalog
There are no named minor planets in this number range

== 350701–350800 ==
back to top

Named minor planet	Provisional	This minor planet was named for...	Ref · Catalog
There are no named minor planets in this number range

== 350801–350900 ==
back to top

Named minor planet	Provisional	This minor planet was named for...	Ref · Catalog
350838 Gorelysheva	2002 EH_{163}	Anna Gorelysheva (1980–2012), a Russian poet and science-fiction writer.	JPL · 350838

== 350901–351000 ==
back to top

Named minor planet	Provisional	This minor planet was named for...	Ref · Catalog
350969 Boiohaemum	2003 DK_{13}	Boiohaemum (modern day Bohemia, Czech Republic), was the land of the Boii Celtic tribes in Danubian Central Europe around the turn of the Common Era, as mentioned by Strabo and Tacitus.	JPL · 350969

back to top

Preceded by 349,001–350,000	Meanings of minor-planet names List of minor planets: 350,001–351,000	Succeeded by 351,001–352,000
